= Seta Tamanivalu =

Fiji & NZ international rugby union player

- Full name: Setareki Tamanivalu
- Born: 23 January 1992 (age 34) Lautoka, Fiji
- Height: 189 cm (6 ft 2 in)
- Weight: 104 kg (16 st 5 lb; 229 lb)
- School: Saint Kentigern College
- Notable relative: Manasa Mataele (nephew)

Rugby union career
- Position(s): Centre, Wing
- Current team: Red Hurricanes Osaka, Taranaki
Senior career
Years	Team	Apps	(Points)
2012–2018 2026–	Taranaki	61	(130)
2015–2016	Chiefs	22	(45)
2017–2018	Crusaders	33	(75)
2018–2020	Bordeaux	37	(45)
2021–2026	Toshiba Brave Lupus	80	(205)
2026–	Red Hurricanes Osaka		
- Correct as of 21 June 2025
International career
Years	Team	Apps	(Points)
2015	Barbarian F.C.	1	(0)
2016–2017	New Zealand	5	(0)
2022–	Fiji	3	(0)
- Correct as of 16 July 2022

Setareki Tamanivalu (born 23 July 1992) is a Fijian rugby union player and former All Black. He currently plays in the centre (and occasionally wing) position for Toshiba Brave Lupus.

== Early life ==
Tamanivalu was born and raised in Fiji. He was a member of the Fiji Secondary Schools under-18 rugby league squad that toured Australia in 2010. He later migrated to New Zealand where he gained a scholarship at Saint Kentigern College to play rugby.

== Playing career ==
=== Early career ===
Tamanivalu was one of five newcomers in Colin Cooper's Taranaki squad named for their 2012 campaign. He made his professional debut for Taranaki in the 2012 ITM Cup competition, coming on as a replacement against Hawke's Bay.

In 2013, the then 21-year-old was named most promising player of the year after a season that saw him get a regular starting spot, his all-round game has been compared to the likes of Taranaki backs. He was considered a threatening attacker, which saw him win top try scorer alongside teammate Andre Taylor.

In the 2014 ITM Cup season he was in the top five statistics in tries scored, clean breaks, defenders beaten, metres gained and offloads. His impressive form saw him win the 2014 ITM Cup player of the year, over finalists Shane Christie and Nehe Milner-Skudder. It also saw several Super Rugby franchises in New Zealand and Australia were chasing his signature before he opted to head to the Chiefs in early October.

=== 2015-2016 ===
Tamanivalu poised for what promised to be an exciting 2015, It never eventuated, however, with Tamanivalu struggling for game-time with the Chiefs in the 2015 Super Rugby competition. Itching to get back into the provincial season, things took a backwards step after he strained a knee playing for the New Zealand Barbarians against the Māori All Blacks. Tamanivalu recorded nine appearances and scored four tries for the Taranaki province.

Tamanivalu had a breakout Super Rugby season in 2016, becoming a regular starter for the Chiefs. Tamanivalu was the third-to-highest try-scorer of the competition in the 2016 Super Rugby season, tied with four other players. Tamanivalu scored nine tries for the Chiefs in 2016, the team's second-to-highest try-scorer behind fullback and future All Black teammate Damian McKenzie.

In June 2016, All Blacks coach, Steve Hansen included him in his 32-man squad for the 2016 June international test series against Wales. He was named on the bench for their first test against Wales, making his international debut on 11 June 2016 alongside flanker Ardie Savea. Tamanivalu only played for five minutes, but the All Blacks managed to win 39-21. Tamanivalu was retained on the bench for the second test of the series on 18 June 2016, coming on early at half-time for an injured Malakai Fekitoa. Tamanivalu unfortunately had an average performance, being bested by Welsh opposite Jonathan Davies as Tamanivalu conceded a try to Davies. The All Blacks still won 36-22, despite Tamanivalu being bested by his opposition.

Tamanivalu was not initially selected for the 2016 Rugby Championship, being replaced by Blues midfielder George Moala who was called in for the third Welsh test as injury cover. Tamanivalu was called back into the All Blacks camp after a concussion to future Crusaders teammate Ryan Crotty and replaced debutant Anton Lienert-Brown on 27 August 2016 as the All Blacks beat the Wallabies 29-9.

On 29 September 2016 it was announced that Tamanivalu had signed a one-year deal with the Crusaders for the 2017 Super Rugby season.

=== 2017-2018 ===
Tamanivalu shifted positions upon moving to the Crusaders, spending most of the 2017 Super Rugby season on the wing. Tamanivalu was again one of the competition's highest try-scorers, scoring his tenth of the season to open the 2017 Super Rugby Final against the Lions in Johannesburg on 5 August 2017. Tamanivalu's try contributed to the Crusaders beating the Lions 25-17 as they won the competition for the eighth time.

Earlier in the year, on 10 June 2017, Tamanivalu started on the right wing for the Crusaders against the touring British and Irish Lions side, playing the full 80 minutes against the Lions. The fixture was a historic loss for the Crusaders who went down 3-12.

After season-ending injuries to All Blacks wingers Nehe Milner-Skudder and Israel Dagg, Tamanivalu earned a re-call to international rugby for the 2017 end-of-year tour. Tamanivalu made his first start for the All Blacks on 5 November 2017 as he played the full 80 minutes on the left wing during the All Blacks' 31-22 victory over the Barbarians at Twickenham Stadium in London. On 14 November 2017, Tamanivalu made his final appearance in the black jersey as he again went without being subbed off as the All Blacks beat a French XV 28-23.

In 2018, Tamanivalu signed a three-year deal with Union Bordeaux Bègles, based in Bordeaux, France. After starting his stint there with a niggling back injury , he has primarily made bench appearances during the curtailed 2019-2020 Top 14 season and European Rugby Challenge Cup.
