= 2016 Rugby Championship =

- Date: 20 August 2016 – 8 October 2016
- Countries: Argentina; Australia; New Zealand; South Africa

Final positions
- Champions: New Zealand (14th title)
- Bledisloe Cup: New Zealand
- Freedom Cup: New Zealand
- Mandela Challenge Plate: Australia
- Puma Trophy: Australia

Tournament statistics
- Matches played: 12
- Tries scored: 70 (5.83 per match)
- Attendance: 431,288 (35,941 per match)
- Top scorer(s): Beauden Barrett (81)
- Most tries: Israel Dagg (5); Ben Smith (5)

The 2016 Rugby Championship was the fifth edition of the annual southern hemisphere Rugby Championship, featuring Argentina, Australia, South Africa and New Zealand. The competition is operated by SANZAAR, a joint venture of the four countries' national unions. New Zealand won their first four matches with bonus points to gain an unassailable lead, winning the title for the fourth time.

The tournament started on 20 August after the 2016 Summer Olympics had concluded, with Australia hosting New Zealand and South Africa hosting Argentina. The tournament ran for eight weeks with two bye weeks, ending on 8 October, when South Africa faced New Zealand and Argentina played Australia at Twickenham Stadium in London.

== Background ==
The tournament was operated by SANZAAR and known for sponsorship reasons as The Castle Rugby Championship in South Africa, The Investec Rugby Championship in New Zealand, The Castrol Edge Rugby Championship in Australia and The Personal Rugby Championship in Argentina.

The 2016 Championship returned to a 6-round format, with each team playing the other home and away. The previous year it had been reduced to 3 rounds so that the 2015 Rugby World Cup could be accommodated. It was the first tournament for which Argentina was a full member of SANZAAR, and the first in which they had a team competing in the SANZAAR-run Super Rugby competition.

For the first time a match was played in a neutral venue. Argentina's home match against Australia on 8 October was held at Twickenham Stadium in London.

Australia were the holders of the title, having won the 2015 edition.

== Overview ==
In June there was a break from the 2016 Super rugby tournament while the four Southern Hemisphere national teams played test matches against touring Northern Hemisphere nations. New Zealand won all three tests against Wales, Australia were whitewashed by England in their three tests (the first time they had lost a series against England in Australia), Argentina's series against France ended in one win each and Ireland won their first match in South Africa before losing the next two and the series. These results and their 11-match winning streak leading into the tournament made New Zealand firm favourites to secure their fourth Rugby Championship title since it expanded to include Argentina five years ago.

The opening match was played between New Zealand and Australia at Stadium Australia in Sydney. New Zealand comprehensively beat Australia 42–8, scoring six tries to one. In the first half Ryan Crotty, Jerome Kaino, Waisake Naholo and man of the match Beauden Barrett scored tries for New Zealand, while Australia only managed a solitary penalty through Bernard Foley. Australia's cause was not helped as they lost three backs (Matt Giteau, Rob Horne and Matt To'omua) to injury. After the break New Zealand scored two more tries with Dane Coles and Julian Savea dotting down, while Nick Phipps scored a consolation try for Australia at the end. South Africa narrowly beat Argentina 30–23 at Mbombela Stadium, scoring a try in the final minutes to take the lead. South Africa took an early lead after Ruan Combrinck scored a try in the corner, but Argentina struck back though a try of their own to Matías Orlando to take a 13–10 lead into the half-time break. Late in the second half Argentina looked to have won the game when Santiago Cordero collected a Nicolás Sánchez chip to give Argentina a 10-point lead with 11 minutes remaining. However, South Africa leveled after a Johan Goosen try and an Elton Jantjies penalty, before Warren Whiteley sealed the win with two minutes remaining.

The second round featured the same teams playing their return matches. New Zealand kept Australia try-less, winning 29–9 and retaining the Bledisloe Cup for the 13th straight year. Despite Israel Dagg scoring two tries, Australia put in a better defensive effort and New Zealand only led 15–9 at the half time break. Julian Savea and Sam Cane scored a try each in the second half while keeping Australia scoreless. Argentina reversed the result against South Africa in Salta, kicking a last minute penalty to secure a 26–24 victory. Argentina outplayed South Africa in the first half, scoring one try to fullback Joaquin Tuculet, to lead 13–3. South Africa struck back in the second half with veteran winger Bryan Habana scoring a record 65th test try. Juan Leguizamon scored a second try for Argentina and they led by seven with 13 minutes remaining. South Africa took the lead for the first time in the match with six minutes left when Pieter-Steph du Toit scored a try and then Morne Steyn landed a penalty. Argentina were able to defended strongly to prevent South Africa scoring any more points, before Gonzalez Iglesias landed a match winning penalty in the 77th minute.

After a week's break Argentina traveled to New Zealand and following a competitive first half dropped away to lose 57–22. Argentina took the lead after only two minutes as Cordero scored under the posts from the opening passage of play. However, New Zealand struck straight back with a Julian Savea try. Ben Smith and Barrett also scored for New Zealand while Sanchez's four penalties kept Argentina close, with New Zealand leading 24–19 at half time. The second half was all New Zealand as they scored five tries to Ben Smith, Charlie Faumuina, Luke Romano and Crotty twice against a solitary penalty from Sanchez. Australia hosted South Africa, ending a six match losing streak after clinching a 23–17 victory in the wet at Brisbane. Only one point separated the two teams at the half time break. Whiteley and Goosen had scored tries early for South Africa to give them the lead, while an Adam Coleman try and two Foley penalties brought Australia to within one point. Early in the second half South African lock Eben Etzebeth was sin binned for a dangerous challenge and Foley kicked the resulting penalty to give Australia a slight lead. Foley then scored the decisive try 20 minutes later to give them their first win of the tournament.

In the fourth round New Zealand continued their winning form, downing South Africa 41–13 in Christchurch, while Argentina fell to a 36–20 defeat in Australia. New Zealand hooker Coles set up tries for Dagg, Julian Savea and Sam Whitelock with some crisp passing. Ben Smith, Ardie Savea and TJ Perenara also scored tries, while South Africa's only try came early when Habana crossed in the first 10 minutes. Australia jumped to a 21-point lead against Argentina after Samu Kerevi, Dane Haylett-Petty and Will Genia all scored converted tries in the first 12 minutes. Argentina responded with two penalties and at half-time the score was 21–6. Cordera scored early in the second half to bring the deficit to eight, before Sean McMahon beat four defenders to set up Genia's second try. Quade Cooper then set up a decisive try for Michael Hooper to give Australia a 20-point lead, with Argentina only managing a late consolation try to Facundo Isa.

Four wins from four games and four bonus points for scoring at least three tries more than their opposition in each game meant that the Rugby Championship title returned to New Zealand with two rounds still to play. The 24 tries scored by New Zealand at this point in the tournament is more than the other three nations combined and they are within three wins of the record for the longest winning streak in tests. Stuart Barnes has labelled the current New Zealand team the most dominant in rugby history, something which former New Zealand captain Sean Fitzpatrick does not think is "good for the game as a whole".

== Standings ==
Place	Nation	Games				Points			Try bonus	Losing bonus	Table points
Place	Nation	Played	Won	Drawn	Lost	For	Against	Diff	Try bonus	Losing bonus	Table points
1	New Zealand	6	6	0	0	262	84	+178	6	0	30
2	Australia	6	3	0	3	119	147	−28	1	0	13
3	South Africa	6	2	0	4	117	180	−63	0	2	10
4	Argentina	6	1	0	5	129	216	−87	0	1	5

== Fixtures ==
=== Round 1 ===
20 August 2016
20:05 AEST (UTC+10)

Australia	8–42	New Zealand (1 BP)
Try: Phipps 74' m Pen: Foley (1/1) 3'	Report	Try: Crotty 5' c Barrett 25' c Kaino 30' m Naholo 38' c Coles 55' m J. Savea 58' m Con: Barrett (3/6) 7', 26', 39'; Pen: Barrett (2/3) 16', 22'

Stadium Australia, Sydney
Attendance: 65,328
Referee: Jaco Peyper (South Africa)

FB	15	Israel Folau
RW	14	Adam Ashley-Cooper
OC	13	Tevita Kuridrani
IC	12	Matt Giteau	(substituted off) 11'
LW	11	Dane Haylett-Petty
FH	10	Bernard Foley
SH	9	Will Genia
N8	8	David Pocock
OF	7	Michael Hooper
BF	6	Ben McCalman	(substituted off) 61'
RL	5	Rob Simmons	(substituted off) 49'
LL	4	Kane Douglas
TP	3	Sekope Kepu	(substituted off) 54'
HK	2	Stephen Moore (c)	(substituted off) 62'
LP	1	Scott Sio	(substituted off) 50'	(substituted on) 74'
Replacements:
HK	16	Tatafu Polota-Nau	(substituted on) 62'
PR	17	James Slipper	(substituted on) 50'	(substituted off) 74'
PR	18	Allan Alaalatoa	(substituted on) 54'
LK	19	Dean Mumm	(substituted on) 49'
FL	20	Scott Fardy	(substituted on) 61'
SH	21	Nick Phipps			(substituted on) 39'
CE	22	Matt To'omua	(substituted on) 11'	(substituted off) 30'
WG	23	Rob Horne		(substituted on) 30'	(substituted off) 39'
Coach:
(Australia) Michael Cheika

FB	15	Israel Dagg
RW	14	Ben Smith
OC	13	Malakai Fekitoa
IC	12	Ryan Crotty		(substituted off) 40'
LW	11	Waisake Naholo		(substituted off) 39'
FH	10	Beauden Barrett
SH	9	Aaron Smith		(substituted off) 67'
N8	8	Kieran Read (c)	(yellow card) 73' to 80'
OF	7	Sam Cane		(substituted off) 63'
BF	6	Jerome Kaino		(substituted off) 57'
RL	5	Sam Whitelock
LL	4	Brodie Retallick
TP	3	Owen Franks		(substituted off) 45'
HK	2	Codie Taylor		(substituted off) 2'
LP	1	Wyatt Crockett		(substituted off) 57'
Replacements:
HK	16	Dane Coles		(substituted on) 2'
PR	17	Kane Hames		(substituted on) 57'
PR	18	Charlie Faumuina		(substituted on) 45'
FL	19	Liam Squire		(substituted on) 57'
FL	20	Ardie Savea		(substituted on) 63'
SH	21	TJ Perenara		(substituted on) 67'
FH	22	Aaron Cruden		(substituted on) 40'
WG	23	Julian Savea		(substituted on) 39'
Coach:
(New Zealand) Steve Hansen

Man of the Match:
Beauden Barrett (New Zealand)

Touch judges:
Romain Poite (France)
Federico Anselmi (Argentina)
Television match official:
Shaun Veldsman (South Africa)

Notes:

- Allan Alaalatoa (Australia) made his international debut.
- Kane Hames (New Zealand) made his international debut.
- This was New Zealand's first win over Australia at Stadium Australia since 2013.

20 August 2016
17:05 SAST (UTC+02)

South Africa	30–23	Argentina (1 BP)
Try: Combrinck 6' c Goosen 70' c Whiteley 78' c Con: Jantjies (3/3) 8', 71', 79'; Pen: Jantjies (3/5) 17', 55', 73'	Report	Try: Orlando 24' c Cordero 66' c Con: Sánchez (2/2) 26', 67'; Pen: Sánchez (3/4) 15', 23', 64'

Mbombela Stadium, Nelspruit
Attendance: 27,357
Referee: Glen Jackson (New Zealand)

FB	15	Johan Goosen
RW	14	Ruan Combrinck
OC	13	Lionel Mapoe
IC	12	Damian de Allende		(substituted off) 73'
LW	11	Bryan Habana	(yellow card) 45' to 55'
FH	10	Elton Jantjies
SH	9	Faf de Klerk
N8	8	Warren Whiteley
OF	7	Oupa Mohojé
BF	6	Francois Louw		(substituted off) 53'
RL	5	Lood de Jager		(substituted off) 53'
LL	4	Eben Etzebeth
TP	3	Julian Redelinghuys		(substituted off) 31'
HK	2	Adriaan Strauss (c)
LP	1	Tendai Mtawarira		(substituted off) 53'
Replacements:
HK	16	Bongi Mbonambi
PR	17	Steven Kitshoff		(substituted on) 53'
PR	18	Vincent Koch		(substituted on) 31'
LK	19	Pieter-Steph du Toit		(substituted on) 53'
FL	20	Jaco Kriel		(substituted on) 53'
SH	21	Rudy Paige
CE	22	Juan de Jongh		(substituted on) 73'
FB	23	Jesse Kriel
Coach:
(South Africa) Allister Coetzee

FB	15	Joaquín Tuculet
RW	14	Santiago Cordero
OC	13	Matías Orlando		(substituted off) 75'
IC	12	Juan Martín Hernández
LW	11	Manuel Montero	(yellow card) 21' to 31'
FH	10	Nicolás Sánchez
SH	9	Martín Landajo		(substituted off) 55'
N8	8	Facundo Isa
OF	7	Juan Manuel Leguizamón		(substituted off) 63'
BF	6	Pablo Matera
RL	5	Tomás Lavanini
LL	4	Matías Alemanno		(substituted off) 55'
TP	3	Ramiro Herrera
HK	2	Agustín Creevy (c)		(substituted off) 62'
LP	1	Nahuel Tetaz Chaparro
Replacements:
HK	16	Julián Montoya		(substituted on) 62'
PR	17	Felipe Arregui
PR	18	Enrique Pieretto
LK	19	Guido Petti		(substituted on) 55'
FL	20	Javier Ortega Desio		(substituted on) 63'
SH	21	Tomás Cubelli		(substituted on) 55'
FH	22	Santiago González Iglesias		(substituted on) 75'
WG	23	Ramiro Moyano
Coach:
(Argentina) Daniel Hourcade

Man of the Match:
Faf de Klerk (South Africa)

Touch judges:
Jérôme Garcès (France)
Ben O'Keeffe (New Zealand)
Television match official:
George Ayoub (Australia)

Notes:

- Agustín Creevy (Argentina) earned his 50th test cap.

=== Round 2 ===
27 August 2016
19:35 NZST (UTC+12)

(1 BP) New Zealand	29–9	Australia
Try: Dagg (2) 7' c, 21' m J. Savea 46' c Cane 61' c Con: Barrett (3/4) 8', 47', 63'; Pen: Barrett (1/3) 13'	Report	Pen: Foley (2/2) 11', 20'; Hodge (1/2) 34'

Wellington Regional Stadium, Wellington
Attendance: 35,372
Referee: Romain Poite (France)

FB	15	Ben Smith
RW	14	Israel Dagg
OC	13	Malakai Fekitoa
IC	12	Anton Lienert-Brown	(substituted off) 75'
LW	11	Julian Savea	(substituted off) 65'
FH	10	Beauden Barrett
SH	9	Aaron Smith	(substituted off) 65'
N8	8	Kieran Read (c)
OF	7	Sam Cane	(substituted off) 72'
BF	6	Jerome Kaino
RL	5	Sam Whitelock
LL	4	Brodie Retallick	(substituted off) 69'
TP	3	Owen Franks	(substituted off) 51'
HK	2	Dane Coles	(substituted off) 69'
LP	1	Joe Moody	(substituted off) 51'
Replacements:
HK	16	James Parsons	(substituted on) 69'
PR	17	Wyatt Crockett	(substituted on) 51'
PR	18	Charlie Faumuina	(substituted on) 51'
FL	19	Liam Squire	(substituted on) 69'
FL	20	Ardie Savea	(substituted on) 72'
SH	21	TJ Perenara	(substituted on) 65'
FH	22	Aaron Cruden	(substituted on) 65'
CE	23	Seta Tamanivalu	(substituted on) 75'
Coach:
(New Zealand) Steve Hansen

FB	15	Israel Folau
RW	14	Adam Ashley-Cooper		(substituted off) 16'
OC	13	Samu Kerevi		(substituted off) 67'
IC	12	Bernard Foley
LW	11	Dane Haylett-Petty
FH	10	Quade Cooper
SH	9	Will Genia		(substituted off) 67'
N8	8	David Pocock			(substituted off) 63'	(substituted on) 69'
OF	7	Michael Hooper
BF	6	Scott Fardy		(substituted off) 37'	(substituted on) 63'	(substituted off) 69'
RL	5	Adam Coleman	(yellow card) 36' to 46'	(substituted off) 63'
LL	4	Kane Douglas
TP	3	Sekope Kepu		(substituted off) 51'
HK	2	Stephen Moore (c)		(substituted off) 38'	(substituted on) 40'	48' to 53'		(substituted off) 63'
LP	1	Scott Sio		(substituted off) 51'
Replacements:
HK	16	Tatafu Polota-Nau		(substituted on) 38'	(substituted off) 40'	(substituted on) 48'	(substituted off) 53'	(substituted on) 63'
PR	17	James Slipper		(substituted on) 51'
PR	18	Allan Alaalatoa		(substituted on) 51'
LK	19	Dean Mumm		(substituted on) 37'
LK	20	Will Skelton		(substituted on) 63'
SH	21	Nick Phipps		(substituted on) 67'
CE	22	Tevita Kuridrani		(substituted on) 67'
FB	23	Reece Hodge		(substituted on) 16'
Coach:
(Australia) Michael Cheika

Man of the Match:
Israel Dagg (New Zealand)

Touch judges:
Jaco Peyper (South Africa)
Federico Anselmi (Argentina)
Television match official:
Shaun Veldsman (South Africa)

Notes:

- Anton Lienert-Brown (New Zealand) and Reece Hodge (Australia) made their international debuts.
- Wyatt Crockett (New Zealand) earned his 50th test cap.
- New Zealand retain the Bledisloe Cup.

27 August 2016
16:40 AST (UTC-03)

Argentina	26–24	South Africa (1 BP)
Try: Tuculet 30' c Leguizamón 47' c Con: Sánchez (1/1) 32'; Hernández (1/1) 48'; Pen: Sánchez (2/2) 22', 29'; Hernández (1/1) 54'; González Iglesias (1/1) 77'	Report	Try: Habana 44' c Du Toit 67' m Con: Goosen (1/1) 45'; Pen: Jantjies (2/4) 20', 42'; Steyn (2/3) 63', 73'

Estadio Padre Ernesto Martearena, Salta
Attendance: 19,000
Referee: Jérôme Garcès (France)

FB	15	Joaquín Tuculet
RW	14	Santiago Cordero
OC	13	Matías Orlando		(substituted off) 60'
IC	12	Juan Martín Hernández		(substituted off) 66'
LW	11	Manuel Montero		(substituted off) 40'
FH	10	Nicolás Sánchez		(substituted off) 45'
SH	9	Martín Landajo
N8	8	Facundo Isa
OF	7	Juan Manuel Leguizamón		(substituted off) 66'
BF	6	Pablo Matera
RL	5	Tomás Lavanini		(substituted off) 45'
LL	4	Matías Alemanno
TP	3	Ramiro Herrera	(yellow card) 19' to 29'
HK	2	Agustín Creevy (c)		(substituted off) 60'
LP	1	Nahuel Tetaz Chaparro		(substituted off) 64'
Replacements:
HK	16	Julián Montoya		(substituted on) 60'
PR	17	Felipe Arregui		(substituted on) 64'
PR	18	Enrique Pieretto		(substituted on) 66'
LK	19	Guido Petti		(substituted on) 45'
FL	20	Javier Ortega Desio		(substituted on) 66'
SH	21	Tomás Cubelli		(substituted on) 60'
FH	22	Santiago González Iglesias		(substituted on) 45'
FB	23	Lucas González Amorosino		(substituted on) 40'
Coach:
(Argentina) Daniel Hourcade

FB	15	Johan Goosen
RW	14	Ruan Combrinck	(substituted off) 32'
OC	13	Lionel Mapoe
IC	12	Damian de Allende
LW	11	Bryan Habana
FH	10	Elton Jantjies	(substituted off) 45'
SH	9	Faf de Klerk	(substituted off) 73'
N8	8	Warren Whiteley
OF	7	Oupa Mohojé
BF	6	Francois Louw	(substituted off) 54'
RL	5	Lood de Jager	(substituted off) 45'
LL	4	Eben Etzebeth
TP	3	Vincent Koch	(substituted off) 45'
HK	2	Adriaan Strauss (c)
LP	1	Tendai Mtawarira	(substituted off) 45'
Replacements:
HK	16	Bongi Mbonambi
PR	17	Steven Kitshoff	(substituted on) 45'
PR	18	Lourens Adriaanse	(substituted on) 45'
LK	19	Pieter-Steph du Toit	(substituted on) 45'
FL	20	Jaco Kriel	(substituted on) 54'
SH	21	Rudy Paige	(substituted on) 73'
FH	22	Morné Steyn	(substituted on) 45'
FB	23	Jesse Kriel	(substituted on) 32'
Coach:
(South Africa) Allister Coetzee

Man of the Match
Facundo Isa (Argentina)

Touch judges:
Glen Jackson (New Zealand)
Ben O'Keeffe (New Zealand)
Television match official:
George Ayoub (Australia)

Notes:

- Felipe Arregui (Argentina) made his international debut.
- Tomás Cubelli (Argentina) earned his 50th test cap.
- Argentina beat South Africa for the first time on home soil.

=== Round 3 ===
10 September 2016
19:35 NZST (UTC+12)

(1 BP) New Zealand	57–22	Argentina
Try: J. Savea 10' c B. Smith (2) 23' c, 66' c Barrett 35' c Crotty (2) 53' c, 63' c Faumuina 56' c Romano 76' m Con: Barrett (6/6) 11', 24', 36', 54', 57', 64'; Cruden (1/2) 68'; Pen: Dagg (1/1) 31'	Report	Try: Cordero 2' c Con: Sánchez (1/1) 2'; Pen: Sánchez (5/6) 14', 18', 26', 38', 49'

Waikato Stadium, Hamilton
Attendance: 23,361
Referee: Craig Joubert (South Africa)

FB	15	Ben Smith
RW	14	Israel Dagg
OC	13	Malakai Fekitoa
IC	12	Ryan Crotty	(substituted off) 68'
LW	11	Julian Savea
FH	10	Beauden Barrett	(substituted off) 64'
SH	9	Aaron Smith	(substituted off) 48'
N8	8	Kieran Read (c)
OF	7	Sam Cane	(substituted off) 45'
BF	6	Jerome Kaino
RL	5	Sam Whitelock
LL	4	Brodie Retallick	(substituted off) 64'
TP	3	Owen Franks	(substituted off) 48'
HK	2	Dane Coles	(substituted off) 52'
LP	1	Joe Moody	(substituted off) 52'
Replacements:
HK	16	Codie Taylor	(substituted on) 52'
PR	17	Wyatt Crockett	(substituted on) 52'
PR	18	Charlie Faumuina	(substituted on) 48'
LK	19	Luke Romano	(substituted on) 64'
FL	20	Ardie Savea	(substituted on) 45'
SH	21	TJ Perenara	(substituted on) 48'
FH	22	Aaron Cruden	(substituted on) 64'
CE	23	Anton Lienert-Brown	(substituted on) 68'
Coach:
(New Zealand) Steve Hansen

FB	15	Joaquín Tuculet
RW	14	Matías Moroni
OC	13	Matías Orlando
IC	12	Juan Martín Hernández	(substituted off) 36'
LW	11	Santiago Cordero
FH	10	Nicolás Sánchez	(substituted off) 64'
SH	9	Martín Landajo	(substituted off) 60'
N8	8	Facundo Isa
OF	7	Javier Ortega Desio
BF	6	Pablo Matera	(substituted off) 64'
RL	5	Matías Alemanno
LL	4	Guido Petti	(substituted off) 40'
TP	3	Ramiro Herrera	(substituted off) 65'
HK	2	Agustín Creevy (c)	(substituted off) 62'
LP	1	Nahuel Tetaz Chaparro	(substituted off) 62'
Replacements:
HK	16	Julián Montoya	(substituted on) 62'
PR	17	Lucas Noguera Paz	(substituted on) 62'
PR	18	Enrique Pieretto	(substituted on) 65'
LK	19	Marcos Kremer	(substituted on) 64'
N8	20	Leonardo Senatore	(substituted on) 40'
SH	21	Tomás Cubelli	(substituted on) 60'
FH	22	Santiago González Iglesias	(substituted on) 36'
WG	23	Ramiro Moyano	(substituted on) 64'
Coach:
(Argentina) Daniel Hourcade

Man of the Match:
Julian Savea (New Zealand)

Touch judges:
Angus Gardner (Australia)
Marius Mitrea (Italy)
Television match official:
George Ayoub (Australia)

Notes:

- Marcos Kremer (Argentina) made his international debut.

10 September 2016
20:05 AEST (UTC+10)

Australia	23–17	South Africa (1 BP)
Try: Coleman 26' c Foley 61' c Con: Foley (2/2) 28', 62'; Pen: Foley (3/3) 10', 34', 42'	Report	Try: Whiteley 2' c Goosen 17' c Con: Jantjies (2/2) 3', 18'; Pen: Steyn (1/1) 65'

Lang Park, Brisbane
Attendance: 30,327
Referee: Nigel Owens (Wales)

FB	15	Israel Folau
RW	14	Dane Haylett-Petty	(substituted off) 68'
OC	13	Samu Kerevi	(substituted off) 73'
IC	12	Bernard Foley
LW	11	Reece Hodge
FH	10	Quade Cooper
SH	9	Will Genia
N8	8	David Pocock	(substituted off) 73'
OF	7	Michael Hooper
BF	6	Dean Mumm
RL	5	Adam Coleman	(substituted off) 54'
LL	4	Kane Douglas
TP	3	Sekope Kepu	(substituted off) 50'
HK	2	Stephen Moore (c)	(substituted off) 54'
LP	1	Scott Sio	(substituted off) 50'
Replacements:
HK	16	Tatafu Polota-Nau	(substituted on) 54'
PR	17	James Slipper	(substituted on) 50'
PR	18	Allan Alaalatoa	(substituted on) 50'
LK	19	Rory Arnold	(substituted on) 54'
FL	20	Sean McMahon	(substituted on) 73'
SH	21	Nick Phipps
CE	22	Tevita Kuridrani	(substituted on) 73'
WG	23	Drew Mitchell	(substituted on) 68'
Coach:
(Australia) Michael Cheika

FB	15	Johan Goosen
RW	14	Bryan Habana		(substituted off) 58'	(substituted on) 63'
OC	13	Jesse Kriel
IC	12	Juan de Jongh
LW	11	Francois Hougaard				(substituted off) 78'
FH	10	Elton Jantjies		(substituted off) 64'
SH	9	Faf de Klerk
N8	8	Warren Whiteley
OF	7	Oupa Mohojé		(substituted off) 46'
BF	6	Francois Louw		(substituted off) 50'
RL	5	Lood de Jager		(substituted off) 40'
LL	4	Eben Etzebeth	(yellow card) 41' to 51'
TP	3	Lourens Adriaanse		(substituted off) 50'
HK	2	Adriaan Strauss (c)		(substituted off) 73'
LP	1	Tendai Mtawarira		(substituted off) 50'
Replacements:
HK	16	Bongi Mbonambi		(substituted on) 73'
PR	17	Trevor Nyakane		(substituted on) 50'
PR	18	Steven Kitshoff		(substituted on) 50'
LK	19	Franco Mostert		(substituted on) 46'
LK	20	Pieter-Steph du Toit		(substituted on) 40'
FL	21	Jaco Kriel		(substituted on) 50'
FH	22	Morné Steyn		(substituted on) 64'
CE	23	Lionel Mapoe		(substituted on) 58'	(substituted off) 63'	(substituted on) 78'
Coach:
(South Africa) Allister Coetzee

Man of the Match:
Michael Hooper

Touch judges:
Wayne Barnes (England)
Pascal Gaüzère (France)
Television match official:
Ben Skeen (New Zealand)

Notes:

- Eben Etzebeth became the youngest South African player to earn his 50th test cap.
- This was Australia's first back-to-back win over South Africa since their 2011/12 wins.
- Australia retain the Mandela Challenge Plate.

=== Round 4 ===
17 September 2016
19:35 NZST (UTC+12)

(1 BP) New Zealand	41–13	South Africa
Try: Dagg 21' m J. Savea 27' c B. Smith 48' c A. Savea 55' c Whitelock 64' m Perenara 70' c Con: Barrett (4/6) 28', 49', 57', 71'; Pen: Barrett (1/1) 8'	Report	Try: Habana 18' c Con: Jantjies (1/1) 19'; Pen: Jantjies (2/2) 36', 52'

Rugby League Park, Christchurch
Attendance: 20,826
Referee: Angus Gardner (Australia)

FB	15	Ben Smith
RW	14	Israel Dagg	(substituted off) 67'
OC	13	Malakai Fekitoa
IC	12	Ryan Crotty	(substituted off) 65'
LW	11	Julian Savea
FH	10	Beauden Barrett
SH	9	Aaron Smith	(substituted off) 63'
N8	8	Kieran Read (c)
OF	7	Ardie Savea	(substituted off) 59'
BF	6	Jerome Kaino	(substituted off) 52'
RL	5	Sam Whitelock
LL	4	Brodie Retallick
TP	3	Owen Franks	(substituted off) 53'
HK	2	Dane Coles	(substituted off) 65'
LP	1	Joe Moody	(substituted off) 45'
Replacements:
HK	16	Codie Taylor	(substituted on) 65'
PR	17	Wyatt Crockett	(substituted on) 45'
PR	18	Charlie Faumuina	(substituted on) 53'
LK	19	Luke Romano	(substituted on) 59'
FL	20	Matt Todd	(substituted on) 52'
SH	21	TJ Perenara	(substituted on) 63'
FH	22	Lima Sopoaga	(substituted on) 67'
CE	23	Anton Lienert-Brown	(substituted on) 65'
Coach:
(New Zealand) Steve Hansen

FB	15	Johan Goosen	(substituted off) 50'
RW	14	Bryan Habana
OC	13	Jesse Kriel
IC	12	Juan de Jongh
LW	11	Francois Hougaard
FH	10	Elton Jantjies	(substituted off) 59'
SH	9	Faf de Klerk
N8	8	Warren Whiteley
OF	7	Oupa Mohojé	(substituted off) 50'
BF	6	Francois Louw	(substituted off) 59'
RL	5	Pieter-Steph du Toit	(substituted off) 62'
LL	4	Eben Etzebeth
TP	3	Vincent Koch	(substituted off) 71'
HK	2	Adriaan Strauss (c)	(substituted off) 43'
LP	1	Tendai Mtawarira	(substituted off) 59'
Replacements:
HK	16	Malcolm Marx	(substituted on) 43'
PR	17	Steven Kitshoff	(substituted on) 59'
PR	18	Lourens Adriaanse	(substituted on) 71'
LK	19	Franco Mostert	(substituted on) 62'
FL	20	Willem Alberts	(substituted on) 50'
FL	21	Jaco Kriel	(substituted on) 59'
FH	22	Morné Steyn	(substituted on) 59'
CE	23	Damian de Allende	(substituted on) 50'
Coach:
(South Africa) Allister Coetzee

Man of the Match:
Dane Coles (New Zealand)

Touch judges:
Pascal Gaüzère (France)
Marius Mitrea (Italy)
Television match official:
George Ayoub (Australia)

Notes:

- Malcolm Marx (South Africa) made his international debut.
- Francois Louw (South Africa) earned his 50th test cap.
- New Zealand retained the Freedom Cup.

17 September 2016
18:05 AWST (UTC+08)

(1 BP) Australia	36–20	Argentina
Try: Kerevi 1' c Haylett-Petty 7' c Genia (2) 11' c, 51' m Hooper 63' c Con: Foley (4/5) 2', 8', 12', 64'; Pen: Hodge (1/1) 74'	Report	Try: Cordero 43' c Isa 71' c Con: Sánchez (2/2) 43', 71'; Pen: Sánchez (2/3) 22', 33'

Perth Oval, Perth
Attendance: 16,202
Referee: Wayne Barnes (England)

FB	15	Israel Folau
RW	14	Dane Haylett-Petty
OC	13	Samu Kerevi		(substituted off) 73'
IC	12	Bernard Foley
LW	11	Reece Hodge
FH	10	Quade Cooper	(yellow card) 67' to 77'
SH	9	Will Genia		(substituted off) 67'
N8	8	David Pocock		(substituted off) 35'
OF	7	Michael Hooper
BF	6	Dean Mumm		(substituted off) 67'
RL	5	Adam Coleman		(substituted off) 60'
LL	4	Rob Simmons
TP	3	Sekope Kepu		(substituted off) 60'
HK	2	Stephen Moore (c)		(substituted off) 48'
LP	1	Scott Sio	(yellow card) 32' to 42'			(substituted off) 60'
Replacements:
HK	16	Tatafu Polota-Nau		(substituted on) 48'
PR	17	James Slipper		(substituted on) 35'	(substituted off) 44'	(substituted on) 60'
PR	18	Tom Robertson		(substituted on) 60'
LK	19	Rory Arnold		(substituted on) 60'
FL	20	Lopeti Timani		(substituted on) 67'
FL	21	Sean McMahon			(substituted on) 44'
SH	22	Nick Phipps		(substituted on) 67'
CE	23	Tevita Kuridrani		(substituted on) 73'
Coach:
(Australia) Michael Cheika

FB	15	Joaquín Tuculet
RW	14	Santiago Cordero
OC	13	Matías Moroni
IC	12	Santiago González Iglesias	(substituted off) 31'	(substituted on) 36'
LW	11	Lucas González Amorosino	(substituted off) 61'
FH	10	Nicolás Sánchez			(substituted off) 67'	(substituted on) 71'
SH	9	Tomás Cubelli	(substituted off) 61'
N8	8	Facundo Isa
OF	7	Juan Manuel Leguizamón	(substituted off) 44'
BF	6	Pablo Matera	(substituted off) 65'
RL	5	Matías Alemanno
LL	4	Javier Ortega Desio
TP	3	Ramiro Herrera	(substituted off) 65'
HK	2	Agustín Creevy (c)	(substituted off) 46'
LP	1	Nahuel Tetaz Chaparro	(substituted off) 61'
Replacements:
HK	16	Julián Montoya	(substituted on) 46'
PR	17	Lucas Noguera Paz	(substituted on) 61'
PR	18	Enrique Pieretto	(substituted on) 65'
LK	19	Marcos Kremer	(substituted on) 65'
N8	20	Leonardo Senatore	(substituted on) 44'
SH	21	Martín Landajo	(substituted on) 61'
CE	22	Gabriel Ascárate	(substituted on) 31'	(substituted off) 36'	(substituted on) 67'	(substituted off) 71'
CE	23	Matías Orlando	(substituted on) 61'
Coach:
(Argentina) Daniel Hourcade

Man of the Match:
Will Genia (Australia)

Touch judges:
Nigel Owens (Wales)
Nick Briant (New Zealand)
Television match official:
Ben Skeen (New Zealand)

Notes:

- Dean Mumm (Australia) earned his 50th test cap.
- Tom Robertson and Lopeti Timani (both Australia) made their international debuts.
- Australia retain the Puma Trophy.
- With this Australian win, New Zealand secured their fourth Rugby Championship title, with two rounds to play.

=== Round 5 ===
1 October 2016
17:05 SAST (UTC+02)

South Africa	18–10	Australia
Pen: Steyn (4/5) 25', 34', 40', 75'; Drop: Steyn (2/2) 4', 79'	Report	Try: Sio 13' c Con: Foley (1/1) 14'; Pen: Foley (1/1) 7'

Loftus Versfeld Stadium, Pretoria
Attendance: 47,500
Referee: Wayne Barnes (England)

FB	15	Patrick Lambie
RW	14	Bryan Habana	(substituted off) 45'
OC	13	Jesse Kriel	(substituted off) 38'
IC	12	Juan de Jongh
LW	11	Francois Hougaard
FH	10	Morné Steyn
SH	9	Rudy Paige	(substituted off) 56'
N8	8	Warren Whiteley
OF	7	Oupa Mohojé	(substituted off) 54'
BF	6	Francois Louw
RL	5	Pieter-Steph du Toit	(substituted off) 44'
LL	4	Eben Etzebeth
TP	3	Vincent Koch	(substituted off) 44'
HK	2	Adriaan Strauss (c)
LP	1	Tendai Mtawarira	(substituted off) 44'
Replacements:
HK	16	Bongi Mbonambi
PR	17	Steven Kitshoff	(substituted on) 44'
PR	18	Julian Redelinghuys	(substituted on) 44'
LK	19	Lood de Jager	(substituted on) 44'
FL	20	Willem Alberts	(substituted on) 56'
FL	21	Jaco Kriel	(substituted on) 54'
CE	22	Lionel Mapoe	(substituted on) 38'
FB	23	Willie le Roux	(substituted on) 45'
Coach:
(South Africa) Allister Coetzee

FB	15	Israel Folau	(yellow card) 33' to 43'
RW	14	Dane Haylett-Petty		(substituted off) 68'
OC	13	Samu Kerevi		(substituted off) 53'
IC	12	Bernard Foley
LW	11	Reece Hodge
FH	10	Quade Cooper
SH	9	Will Genia		(substituted off) 76'
N8	8	Sean McMahon		(substituted off) 40'
OF	7	Michael Hooper
BF	6	Dean Mumm
RL	5	Adam Coleman		(substituted off) 45'
LL	4	Rob Simmons
TP	3	Sekope Kepu		(substituted off) 55'
HK	2	Stephen Moore (c)
LP	1	Scott Sio		(substituted off) 55'
Replacements:
HK	16	James Hanson
PR	17	James Slipper		(substituted on) 55'
PR	18	Tom Robertson		(substituted on) 55'
LK	19	Kane Douglas		(substituted on) 45'
FL	20	Scott Fardy		(substituted on) 40'
SH	21	Nick Phipps		(substituted on) 76'
CE	23	Tevita Kuridrani		(substituted on) 53'
WG	23	Sefa Naivalu		(substituted on) 68'
Coach:
(Australia) Michael Cheika

Man of the Match:
Adriaan Strauss (South Africa)

Touch judges:
John Lacey (Ireland)
George Clancy (Ireland)
Television match official:
Jim Yuille (Scotland)

Notes:

- Sefa Naivalu (Australia) made his international debut.

1 October 2016
19:10 AST (UTC−03)

Argentina	17–36	New Zealand (1 BP)
Try: Isa 57' c Tuculet 76' c Con: Sánchez (1/1) 57'; González Iglesias (1/1) 77'; Pen: Sánchez (1/1) 33'	Report	Try: Lienert-Brown 27' c Crotty 34' c Coles 38' c Perenara 39' m Smith 44' c Con: Barrett (4/5) 28', 34', 36', 45'; Pen: Barrett (1/1) 2'

José Amalfitani Stadium, Buenos Aires
Attendance: 46,000
Referee: Jaco Peyper (South Africa)

FB	15	Joaquín Tuculet
RW	14	Santiago Cordero
OC	13	Matías Moroni	(substituted off) 75'
IC	12	Santiago González Iglesias
LW	11	Ramiro Moyano
FH	10	Nicolás Sánchez	(substituted off) 68'
SH	9	Martín Landajo	(substituted off) 56'
N8	8	Facundo Isa	(substituted off) 79'
OF	7	Javier Ortega Desio
BF	6	Pablo Matera	(substituted off) 65'
RL	5	Matías Alemanno	(substituted off) 57'
LL	4	Guido Petti
TP	3	Ramiro Herrera	(substituted off) 63'
HK	2	Agustín Creevy (c)	(substituted off) 48'
LP	1	Nahuel Tetaz Chaparro	(substituted off) 52'
Replacements:
HK	16	Julián Montoya	(substituted on) 48'
PR	17	Lucas Noguera Paz	(substituted on) 52'
PR	18	Enrique Pieretto	(substituted on) 63'
FL	19	Juan Manuel Leguizamón	(substituted on) 65'
N8	20	Leonardo Senatore	(substituted on) 57'
SH	21	Tomás Cubelli	(substituted on) 56'
CE	22	Jerónimo de la Fuente	(substituted on) 68'
CE	23	Matías Orlando	(substituted on) 75'
Coach:
(Argentina) Daniel Hourcade

FB	15	Ben Smith
RW	14	Israel Dagg
OC	13	Anton Lienert-Brown
IC	12	Ryan Crotty		(substituted off) 48'
LW	11	Julian Savea
FH	10	Beauden Barrett		(substituted off) 75'
SH	9	TJ Perenara		(substituted off) 68'
N8	8	Kieran Read (c)		(substituted off) 75'
OF	7	Ardie Savea
BF	6	Liam Squire	(yellow card) 64' to 74'	(substituted off) 51'	(substituted on) 63'
RL	5	Brodie Retallick		(substituted off) 47'
LL	4	Patrick Tuipulotu
TP	3	Owen Franks		(substituted off) 63'
HK	2	Dane Coles		(substituted off) 69'
LP	1	Joe Moody	(yellow card) 51' to 61'		(substituted off) 63'
Replacements:
HK	16	Codie Taylor		(substituted on) 69'
PR	17	Wyatt Crockett		(substituted on) 51'
PR	18	Ofa Tu'ungafasi		(substituted on) 63'
LK	19	Sam Whitelock		(substituted on) 47'
N8	20	Elliot Dixon		(substituted on) 75'
SH	21	Tawera Kerr-Barlow		(substituted on) 68'
FH	22	Lima Sopoaga		(substituted on) 75'
FB	23	Damian McKenzie		(substituted on) 48'
Coach:
(New Zealand) Steve Hansen

Man of the Match:
Anton Lienert-Brown (New Zealand)

Touch judges:
Stuart Berry (South Africa)
Marius van der Westhuizen (South Africa)
Television match official:
Johan Greeff (South Africa)

Notes:

- Damian McKenzie (New Zealand) made his international debut.

=== Round 6 ===
8 October 2016
17:00 SAST (UTC+02)

South Africa	15–57	New Zealand (1 BP)
Pen: Steyn (5/5) 4', 17', 26', 49', 58'	Report	Try: Dagg (2) 21' m, 43' m Perenara (2) 32' c, 60' c Barrett (2) 54' m, 70' c Taylor 73' c Smith 76' c Squire 80' c Con: Barrett (3/6) 32', 61', 71'; Sopoaga (3/3) 73', 77', 80'

Kings Park Stadium, Durban
Attendance: 51,500
Referee: Jérôme Garcès (France)

FB	15	Patrick Lambie
RW	14	Francois Hougaard
OC	13	Juan de Jongh
IC	12	Damian de Allende
LW	11	Bryan Habana
FH	10	Morné Steyn		(substituted off) 63'
SH	9	Faf de Klerk		(substituted off) 67'
N8	8	Warren Whiteley
OF	7	Oupa Mohojé		(substituted off) 45'
BF	6	Francois Louw		(substituted off) 11'
RL	5	Pieter-Steph du Toit
LL	4	Eben Etzebeth		(substituted off) 45'
TP	3	Vincent Koch		(substituted off) 45'
HK	2	Adriaan Strauss (c)		(substituted off) 73'
LP	1	Tendai Mtawarira		(substituted off) 50'
Replacements:
HK	16	Bongi Mbonambi		(substituted on) 73'
PR	17	Steven Kitshoff		(substituted on) 50'
PR	18	Julian Redelinghuys		(substituted on) 45'
LK	19	Lood de Jager	(yellow card) 71' to 80'	(substituted on) 45'
FL	20	Willem Alberts		(substituted on) 45'
FL	21	Jaco Kriel		(substituted on) 11'
CE	22	Lionel Mapoe		(substituted on) 67'
FB	23	Willie le Roux		(substituted on) 63'
Coach:
(South Africa) Allister Coetzee

FB	15	Ben Smith
RW	14	Israel Dagg
OC	13	Anton Lienert-Brown
IC	12	Ryan Crotty		(substituted off) 65'
LW	11	Waisake Naholo		(substituted off) 62'
FH	10	Beauden Barrett
SH	9	TJ Perenara		(substituted off) 67'
N8	8	Kieran Read (c)
OF	7	Matt Todd		(substituted off) 55'
BF	6	Jerome Kaino		(substituted off) 62'
RL	5	Sam Whitelock
LL	4	Brodie Retallick
TP	3	Owen Franks		(substituted off) 65'
HK	2	Dane Coles		(substituted off) 67'
LP	1	Joe Moody		(substituted off) 50'
Replacements:
HK	16	Codie Taylor	(yellow card) 80' to 80'	(substituted on) 67'
PR	17	Wyatt Crockett		(substituted on) 50'
PR	18	Charlie Faumuina		(substituted on) 65'
FL	19	Liam Squire		(substituted on) 62'
FL	20	Ardie Savea		(substituted on) 55'
SH	21	Tawera Kerr-Barlow		(substituted on) 67'
FH	22	Lima Sopoaga		(substituted on) 62'
CE	23	George Moala		(substituted on) 65'
Coach:
(New Zealand) Steve Hansen

Man of the Match:
Brodie Retallick (New Zealand)

Touch judges:
John Lacey (Ireland)
George Clancy (Ireland)
Television match official:
Jim Yuille (Scotland)

Notes:

- This was New Zealand's biggest winning margin over South Africa away, surpassing the previous 36 point-margin set in 2003.
- The 57 points scored were the most conceded by South Africa ever.
- New Zealand equaled a tier 1 record of 17 consecutive wins in a row.

8 October 2016
19:30 BST (UTC+01)

Argentina	21–33	Australia
Try: Alemanno 20' m De la Fuente 44' c Con: González Iglesias (1/2) 46'; Pen: González Iglesias (3/5) 40', 54', 69'	Report	Try: Coleman 5' c Kerevi (2) 38' m, 49' c Mumm 76' m Con: Foley (2/4) 6', 50'; Pen: Foley (3/3) 10', 26', 73'

Twickenham Stadium, London, England
Attendance: 48,515
Referee: Mathieu Raynal (France)

FB	15	Joaquín Tuculet
RW	14	Matías Moroni
OC	13	Matías Orlando
IC	12	Jerónimo de la Fuente
LW	11	Ramiro Moyano	(substituted off) 57'
FH	10	Santiago González Iglesias
SH	9	Martín Landajo
N8	8	Leonardo Senatore	(substituted off) 50'
OF	7	Javier Ortega Desio
BF	6	Pablo Matera
RL	5	Matías Alemanno
LL	4	Guido Petti	(substituted off) 74'
TP	3	Ramiro Herrera	(substituted off) 67'
HK	2	Agustín Creevy (c)	(substituted off) 65'
LP	1	Lucas Noguera Paz	(substituted off) 67'
Replacements:
HK	16	Julián Montoya	(substituted on) 65'
PR	17	Santiago García Botta	(substituted on) 67'
PR	18	Enrique Pieretto	(substituted on) 67'
LK	19	Marcos Kremer	(substituted on) 74'
FL	20	Juan Manuel Leguizamón	(substituted on) 50'
SH	21	Tomás Cubelli	(substituted on) 57'
CE	22	Gabriel Ascárate
FB	23	Lucas González Amorosino
Coach:
(Argentina) Daniel Hourcade

FB	15	Israel Folau		(substituted off) 78'
RW	14	Dane Haylett-Petty
OC	13	Samu Kerevi
IC	12	Bernard Foley
LW	11	Reece Hodge
FH	10	Quade Cooper
SH	9	Will Genia		(substituted off) 63'
N8	8	Lopeti Timani		(substituted off) 69'
OF	7	Michael Hooper	(yellow card) 16' to 26'
BF	6	Dean Mumm
RL	5	Adam Coleman	(yellow card) 30' to 40'	(substituted off) 60'
LL	4	Rory Arnold		(substituted off) 54'
TP	3	Sekope Kepu		(substituted off) 60'
HK	2	Stephen Moore (c)		(substituted off) 74'
LP	1	Scott Sio		(substituted off) 60'
Replacements:
HK	16	James Hanson		(substituted on) 74'
PR	17	Tom Robertson		(substituted on) 60'
PR	18	Allan Alaalatoa		(substituted on) 60'
LK	19	Kane Douglas		(substituted on) 60'
FL	20	Scott Fardy		(substituted on) 54'
N8	21	Leroy Houston		(substituted on) 69'
SH	22	Nick Phipps		(substituted on) 63'
CE	23	Tevita Kuridrani		(substituted on) 78'
Coach:
(Australia) Michael Cheika

Man of the Match:
Samu Kerevi (Australia)

Touch judges:
JP Doyle (England)
Matthew Carley (England)
Television match official:
Rowan Kitt (England)

Notes:

- Leroy Houston (Australia) made his international debut.

== Squads ==
=== Summary ===
Nation	Match venues			Head coach	Captain
Nation	Name	City	Capacity	Head coach	Captain
Argentina	Twickenham Stadium (Note: The UAR will take their home game against Australia to Twickenham Stadium in London, and play the game in a neutral venue.)	London	82,000	(Argentina) Daniel Hourcade	Agustín Creevy
Argentina	José Amalfitani Stadium	Buenos Aires	49,540	(Argentina) Daniel Hourcade	Agustín Creevy
Argentina	Estadio Padre Ernesto Martearena	Salta	20,408	(Argentina) Daniel Hourcade	Agustín Creevy
Australia	Stadium Australia	Sydney	84,000	(Australia) Michael Cheika	Stephen Moore
Australia	Lang Park	Brisbane	52,500	(Australia) Michael Cheika	Stephen Moore
Australia	Perth Oval	Perth	20,500	(Australia) Michael Cheika	Stephen Moore
New Zealand	Wellington Regional Stadium	Wellington	34,500	(New Zealand) Steve Hansen	Kieran Read
New Zealand	Waikato Stadium	Hamilton	25,800	(New Zealand) Steve Hansen	Kieran Read
New Zealand	Rugby League Park	Christchurch	18,000	(New Zealand) Steve Hansen	Kieran Read
South Africa	Kings Park Stadium	Durban	52,000	(South Africa) Allister Coetzee	Adriaan Strauss
South Africa	Loftus Versfeld Stadium	Pretoria	51,762	(South Africa) Allister Coetzee	Adriaan Strauss
South Africa	Mbombela Stadium	Nelspruit	40,929	(South Africa) Allister Coetzee	Adriaan Strauss

Note: Ages, caps and domestic side are of 20 August 2016 – the starting date of the tournament

=== Argentina ===
On 20 July 2016, Argentina named a 33-man squad for the Championship.

^{1} On 10 August 2016, Felipe Arregui, replacing Santiago García Botta, was named in Argentina's 26-man travelling squad for the opening match against South Africa.

Player	Position	Date of birth (age)	Caps	Club/province
Facundo Bosch	Hooker	8 August 1991 (aged 25)	2	(Argentina) CUBA
Agustín Creevy (c)	Hooker	15 March 1985 (aged 31)	49	(Argentina) Jaguares
Julián Montoya	Hooker	29 October 1993 (aged 22)	19	(Argentina) Jaguares
Felipe Arregui ^{1}	Prop	9 June 1994 (aged 22)	0	(Argentina) Duendes
Santiago García Botta ^{1}	Prop	19 June 1992 (aged 24)	9	(Argentina) Jaguares
Ramiro Herrera	Prop	14 February 1989 (aged 27)	22	(Argentina) Jaguares
Lucas Noguera Paz	Prop	5 October 1993 (aged 22)	23	(Argentina) Jaguares
Enrique Pieretto	Prop	15 December 1994 (aged 21)	3	(Argentina) Córdoba
Nahuel Tetaz Chaparro	Prop	6 November 1989 (aged 26)	25	(Argentina) Jaguares
Matías Alemanno	Lock	5 December 1991 (aged 24)	21	(Argentina) Jaguares
Marcos Kremer	Lock	30 July 1997 (aged 19)	0	(Argentina) Atlético del Rosario
Tomás Lavanini	Lock	22 January 1993 (aged 23)	28	(Argentina) Jaguares
Guido Petti	Lock	17 November 1994 (aged 21)	15	(Argentina) Jaguares
Juan Manuel Leguizamón	Flanker	6 June 1983 (aged 33)	68	(Argentina) Jaguares
Tomás Lezana	Flanker	16 February 1994 (aged 22)	8	(Argentina) Jaguares
Pablo Matera	Flanker	18 July 1993 (aged 23)	25	(Argentina) Jaguares
Javier Ortega Desio	Flanker	14 June 1990 (aged 26)	22	(Argentina) Jaguares
Facundo Isa	Number 8	21 September 1993 (aged 22)	16	(Argentina) Jaguares
Leonardo Senatore	Number 8	13 May 1984 (aged 32)	36	(Argentina) Jaguares
Tomás Cubelli	Scrum-half	12 June 1989 (aged 27)	48	(Australia) Brumbies
Felipe Ezcurra	Scrum-half	15 April 1993 (aged 23)	3	(Argentina) Jaguares
Martín Landajo	Scrum-half	14 June 1988 (aged 28)	56	(Argentina) Jaguares
Santiago González Iglesias	Fly-half	16 June 1988 (aged 28)	22	(Argentina) Jaguares
Nicolás Sánchez	Fly-half	26 October 1988 (aged 27)	42	(Argentina) Jaguares
Gabriel Ascárate	Centre	20 October 1987 (aged 28)	17	(Argentina) Jaguares
Jerónimo de la Fuente	Centre	24 February 1991 (aged 25)	21	(Argentina) Jaguares
Juan Martín Hernández	Centre	7 August 1982 (aged 34)	60	(Argentina) Jaguares
Matías Moroni	Centre	29 March 1991 (aged 25)	11	(Argentina) Jaguares
Matías Orlando	Centre	14 November 1991 (aged 24)	11	(Argentina) Jaguares
Santiago Cordero	Wing	6 December 1993 (aged 22)	21	(Argentina) Jaguares
Manuel Montero	Wing	20 November 1991 (aged 24)	24	(Argentina) Jaguares
Ramiro Moyano	Wing	28 May 1990 (aged 26)	8	(Argentina) Jaguares
Lucas González Amorosino	Fullback	2 November 1985 (aged 30)	50	(Argentina) Jaguares
Joaquín Tuculet	Fullback	8 August 1989 (aged 27)	31	(Argentina) Jaguares

=== Australia ===
On 29 July 2016, Michael Cheika named a 36-man training squad for the 2016 Rugby Championship.

On 5 August, Cheika named the final 33-man squad for the Championship, with Nick Frisby, Luke Morahan and Toby Smith missing out on the final squad.

^{1} On 4 September, Rory Arnold, Kyle Godwin, Luke Morahan, Sefa Naivalu and Henry Speight were called up to the squad as injury replacements and cover for Adam Ashley-Cooper (returned to France), Matt Giteau and Rob Horne (ruled out for remainder of Championship) and Ben McCalman and Matt To'omua (still recovering from injury sustained in Round 1).

^{2} On 11 September, Toby Smith was called up to the squad as injury cover for Allan Alaalatoa, who was ruled out of Round 4 after sustaining an injury against South Africa in Round 3.

^{3} On 21 September, Nick Frisby and Tolu Latu was called up to the squad for the final two rounds, with Latu replacing Tatafu Polota-Nau in the squad due to injury.

^{4} On 3 October, Leroy Houston was called up to the squad as an injury replacement for Sean McMahon ahead of the final round of the Championship.

Player	Position	Date of birth (age)	Caps	Club/province
James Hanson	Hooker	15 September 1988 (aged 27)	10	(Australia) Melbourne Rebels
Tolu Latu ^{3}	Hooker	23 February 1993 (aged 23)	0	(Australia) Waratahs
Stephen Moore (c)	Hooker	20 January 1983 (aged 33)	105	(Australia) Brumbies
Tatafu Polota-Nau ^{3}	Hooker	26 July 1985 (aged 31)	64	(Australia) Waratahs
Allan Alaalatoa ^{2}	Prop	28 January 1994 (aged 22)	0	(Australia) Brumbies
Sekope Kepu	Prop	5 February 1986 (aged 30)	66	(Australia) Waratahs
Tom Robertson	Prop	28 August 1994 (aged 21)	0	(Australia) Waratahs
Scott Sio	Prop	16 October 1991 (aged 24)	18	(Australia) Brumbies
James Slipper	Prop	6 June 1989 (aged 27)	77	(Australia) Queensland Reds
Toby Smith ^{2}	Prop	10 October 1988 (aged 27)	4	(Australia) Melbourne Rebels
Rory Arnold ^{1}	Lock	1 July 1990 (aged 26)	2	(Australia) Brumbies
Adam Coleman	Lock	7 October 1991 (aged 24)	1	(Australia) Western Force
Kane Douglas	Lock	1 June 1989 (aged 27)	23	(Australia) Queensland Reds
Dean Mumm	Lock	5 March 1984 (aged 32)	46	(Australia) Waratahs
Rob Simmons	Lock	19 April 1989 (aged 27)	62	(Australia) Queensland Reds
Will Skelton	Lock	3 May 1992 (aged 24)	15	(Australia) Waratahs
Scott Fardy	Flanker	5 July 1984 (aged 32)	33	(Australia) Brumbies
Michael Hooper	Flanker	29 October 1991 (aged 24)	54	(Australia) Waratahs
Sean McMahon	Flanker	18 June 1994 (aged 22)	9	(Australia) Melbourne Rebels
David Pocock	Flanker	23 April 1988 (aged 28)	56	(Australia) Brumbies
Lopeti Timani	Flanker	28 September 1990 (aged 25)	0	(Australia) Melbourne Rebels
Leroy Houston ^{4}	Number 8	10 November 1986 (aged 29)	0	(Australia) Queensland Reds
Ben McCalman ^{1}	Number 8	18 March 1988 (aged 28)	48	(Australia) Western Force
Nick Frisby ^{3}	Scrum-half	29 October 1992 (aged 23)	2	(Australia) Queensland Reds
Will Genia	Scrum-half	17 January 1988 (aged 28)	66	(France) Stade Français
Nick Phipps	Scrum-half	9 January 1989 (aged 27)	42	(Australia) Waratahs
Quade Cooper	Fly-half	5 April 1988 (aged 28)	58	Unattached
Bernard Foley	Fly-half	8 September 1989 (aged 26)	30	(Australia) Waratahs
Matt Giteau ^{1}	Centre	29 September 1982 (aged 33)	102	(France) Toulon
Kyle Godwin ^{1}	Centre	30 July 1992 (aged 24)	0	(Australia) Western Force
Samu Kerevi	Centre	27 September 1993 (aged 22)	2	(Australia) Queensland Reds
Tevita Kuridrani	Centre	31 March 1991 (aged 25)	34	(Australia) Brumbies
Matt To'omua ^{1}	Centre	2 January 1990 (aged 26)	32	(Australia) Brumbies
Adam Ashley-Cooper ^{1}	Wing	27 March 1984 (aged 32)	114	(France) Bordeaux Bègles
Dane Haylett-Petty	Wing	18 June 1989 (aged 27)	3	(Australia) Western Force
Rob Horne ^{1}	Wing	15 August 1989 (aged 27)	32	(Australia) Waratahs
Drew Mitchell	Wing	26 March 1984 (aged 32)	70	(France) Toulon
Luke Morahan ^{1}	Wing	13 April 1990 (aged 26)	2	(Australia) Western Force
Sefa Naivalu ^{1}	Wing	7 January 1992 (aged 24)	0	(Australia) Melbourne Rebels
Henry Speight ^{1}	Wing	24 March 1988 (aged 28)	5	(Australia) Brumbies
Israel Folau	Fullback	3 April 1989 (aged 27)	41	(Australia) Waratahs
Reece Hodge	Fullback	26 August 1994 (aged 21)	0	(Australia) Melbourne Rebels

=== New Zealand ===
New Zealand's 32-man squad for the Championship was announced on 1 August 2016.

^{1} On 11 August, Anton Lienert-Brown was called up to replace Sonny Bill Williams who was injured during the 2016 Summer Olympics rugby sevens tournament.

^{2} On 14 August, Kane Hames and Matt Todd were added to the squad for the first match of the Championship as injury cover for Joe Moody and Sam Cane.

^{3} On 22 August, Liam Coltman, Rieko Ioane, Damian McKenzie, James Parsons and Seta Tamanivalu were called up to the squad as injury cover for Ryan Crotty, Nathan Harris, George Moala, Waisake Naholo and Codie Taylor.

Player	Position	Date of birth (age)	Caps	Club/province
Dane Coles	Hooker	10 December 1986 (aged 29)	39	Hurricanes / Wellington
Liam Coltman ^{3}	Hooker	25 January 1990 (aged 26)	0	Highlanders / Otago
Nathan Harris ^{3}	Hooker	8 March 1992 (aged 24)	4	Chiefs / Bay of Plenty
James Parsons ^{3}	Hooker	27 November 1986 (aged 29)	1	Blues / North Harbour
Codie Taylor ^{3}	Hooker	31 March 1991 (aged 25)	5	Crusaders / Canterbury
Wyatt Crockett	Prop	24 January 1983 (aged 33)	48	Crusaders / Canterbury
Charlie Faumuina	Prop	24 December 1986 (aged 29)	36	Blues / Auckland
Owen Franks	Prop	23 December 1987 (aged 28)	80	Crusaders / Canterbury
Kane Hames ^{2}	Prop	28 August 1988 (aged 27)	0	Chiefs / Tasman
Joe Moody ^{2}	Prop	18 September 1988 (aged 27)	14	Crusaders / Canterbury
Ofa Tu'ungafasi	Prop	19 April 1992 (aged 24)	1	Blues / Auckland
Brodie Retallick	Lock	31 May 1991 (aged 25)	50	Chiefs / Hawke's Bay
Luke Romano	Lock	16 February 1986 (aged 30)	24	Crusaders / Canterbury
Patrick Tuipulotu	Lock	23 January 1993 (aged 23)	9	Blues / Auckland
Sam Whitelock	Lock	12 October 1988 (aged 27)	75	Crusaders / Canterbury
Sam Cane ^{2}	Flanker	13 January 1992 (aged 24)	34	Chiefs / Bay of Plenty
Jerome Kaino	Flanker	6 April 1983 (aged 33)	69	Blues / Auckland
Ardie Savea	Flanker	14 October 1993 (aged 22)	2	Hurricanes / Wellington
Liam Squire	Flanker	20 March 1991 (aged 25)	1	Highlanders / Tasman
Matt Todd ^{2}	Flanker	24 March 1988 (aged 28)	3	Crusaders / Canterbury
Elliot Dixon	Number 8	4 September 1989 (aged 26)	1	Highlanders / Southland
Kieran Read (c)	Number 8	26 October 1985 (aged 30)	87	Crusaders / Canterbury
Tawera Kerr-Barlow	Half-back	15 August 1990 (aged 26)	21	Chiefs / Waikato
TJ Perenara	Half-back	23 January 1992 (aged 24)	19	Hurricanes / Wellington
Aaron Smith	Half-back	21 November 1988 (aged 27)	50	Highlanders / Manawatu
Beauden Barrett	First five-eighth	27 May 1991 (aged 25)	39	Hurricanes / Taranaki
Aaron Cruden	First five-eighth	8 January 1989 (aged 27)	39	Chiefs / Manawatu
Lima Sopoaga	First five-eighth	3 February 1991 (aged 25)	2	Highlanders / Southland
Ryan Crotty ^{3}	Centre	23 September 1988 (aged 27)	18	Crusaders / Canterbury
Malakai Fekitoa	Centre	10 May 1992 (aged 24)	15	Highlanders / Auckland
Anton Lienert-Brown ^{1}	Centre	15 April 1995 (aged 21)	0	Chiefs / Waikato
George Moala ^{3}	Centre	5 November 1990 (aged 25)	2	Blues / Auckland
Seta Tamanivalu ^{3}	Centre	23 July 1992 (aged 24)	2	Chiefs / Taranaki
Sonny Bill Williams ^{1}	Centre	3 August 1985 (aged 31)	33	Chiefs / Counties Manukau
Rieko Ioane ^{3}	Wing	18 March 1997 (aged 19)	0	Blues / Auckland
Waisake Naholo ^{3}	Wing	8 May 1991 (aged 25)	6	Highlanders / Taranaki
Julian Savea	Wing	7 August 1990 (aged 26)	43	Hurricanes / Wellington
Ben Smith	Wing	1 June 1986 (aged 30)	51	Highlanders / Otago
Israel Dagg	Fullback	6 June 1988 (aged 28)	51	Crusaders / Hawke's Bay
Damian McKenzie ^{3}	Fullback	20 April 1995 (aged 21)	0	Chiefs / Waikato

=== South Africa ===
Head coach Allister Coetzee named the following 31-man training squad for the 2016 Rugby Championship on 6 August 2016:

^{1} Trevor Nyakane was initially included pending medical clearance. However, his ankle injury ruled him out of the first two matches of the Rugby Championship and he was replaced by Lourens Adriaanse.

^{2} On 11 September, Willem Alberts was called up to the squad as injury cover for Lood de Jager.

^{3} On 21 September, Patrick Lambie and Willie le Roux were called up to the squad, with Lambie being called up after recovering from injury and Le Roux a tactical call up.

^{4} On 3 October, Piet van Zyl was called up to the squad as an injury replacement for Rudy Paige for the final round of the Championship.

Player	Position	Date of birth (age)	Caps	Club/province
Malcolm Marx	Hooker	13 July 1994 (aged 22)	0	(South Africa) Lions
Bongi Mbonambi	Hooker	7 January 1991 (aged 25)	1	(South Africa) Stormers
Adriaan Strauss (c)	Hooker	18 November 1985 (aged 30)	57	(South Africa) Bulls
Lourens Adriaanse ^{1}	Prop	5 February 1988 (aged 28)	1	(South Africa) Sharks
Steven Kitshoff	Prop	10 February 1992 (aged 24)	1	(France) Bordeaux
Vincent Koch	Prop	13 March 1990 (aged 26)	2	(South Africa) Stormers
Tendai Mtawarira	Prop	1 August 1985 (aged 31)	78	(South Africa) Sharks
Trevor Nyakane ^{1}	Prop	4 May 1989 (aged 27)	25	(South Africa) Bulls
Julian Redelinghuys	Prop	11 September 1989 (aged 26)	5	(South Africa) Lions
Lood de Jager ^{2}	Lock	17 December 1992 (aged 23)	20	(South Africa) Cheetahs
Pieter-Steph du Toit	Lock	20 August 1992 (aged 24)	11	(South Africa) Stormers
Eben Etzebeth	Lock	29 October 1991 (aged 24)	47	(South Africa) Stormers
Franco Mostert	Lock	27 November 1990 (aged 25)	2	(South Africa) Lions
Willem Alberts ^{2}	Flanker	11 May 1984 (aged 32)	38	(France) Stade Français
Jaco Kriel	Flanker	21 August 1989 (aged 26)	1	(South Africa) Lions
Francois Louw	Flanker	15 June 1985 (aged 31)	46	(England) Bath
Oupa Mohojé	Flanker	3 August 1990 (aged 26)	8	(South Africa) Cheetahs
Sikhumbuzo Notshe	Flanker	28 May 1993 (aged 23)	0	(South Africa) Stormers
Duane Vermeulen	Number 8	3 July 1986 (aged 30)	37	(France) Toulon
Warren Whiteley	Number 8	18 September 1987 (aged 28)	6	(South Africa) Lions
Faf de Klerk	Scrum-half	19 October 1991 (aged 24)	3	(South Africa) Lions
Francois Hougaard	Scrum-half	6 April 1988 (aged 28)	35	(England) Worcester Warriors
Rudy Paige ^{4}	Scrum-half	2 August 1989 (aged 27)	3	(South Africa) Bulls
Piet van Zyl ^{4}	Scrum-half	14 September 1989 (aged 26)	2	(South Africa) Bulls
Elton Jantjies	Fly-half	1 August 1990 (aged 26)	5	(South Africa) Lions
Patrick Lambie ^{3}	Fly-half	17 October 1990 (aged 25)	51	(South Africa) Sharks
Morné Steyn	Fly-half	11 July 1984 (aged 32)	61	(France) Stade Français
Damian de Allende	Centre	25 November 1991 (aged 24)	16	(South Africa) Stormers
Juan de Jongh	Centre	15 April 1988 (aged 28)	14	(South Africa) Stormers
Lionel Mapoe	Centre	13 July 1988 (aged 28)	4	(South Africa) Lions
Ruan Combrinck	Wing	10 May 1990 (aged 26)	2	(South Africa) Lions
Bryan Habana	Wing	12 June 1983 (aged 33)	117	(France) Toulon
Lwazi Mvovo	Wing	3 June 1986 (aged 30)	17	(South Africa) Sharks
Johan Goosen	Fullback	27 July 1992 (aged 24)	6	(France) Racing 92
Jesse Kriel	Fullback	15 February 1994 (aged 22)	12	(South Africa) Bulls
Willie le Roux ^{3}	Fullback	18 August 1989 (aged 27)	37	(Japan) Canon Eagles

== Statistics ==
=== Points scorers ===
Pos	Name	Team	Pts
1	Beauden Barrett	New Zealand	81
2	Bernard Foley	Australia	53
2	Nicolás Sánchez	Argentina	53
4	Morné Steyn	South Africa	42
5	Elton Jantjies	South Africa	33
6	Israel Dagg	New Zealand	28
7	Ben Smith	New Zealand	25
8	Ryan Crotty	New Zealand	20
8	TJ Perenara	New Zealand	20
8	Julian Savea	New Zealand	20

=== Try scorers ===
Pos	Name	Team	Tries
1	Israel Dagg	New Zealand	5
1	Ben Smith	New Zealand	5
3	Beauden Barrett	New Zealand	4
3	Ryan Crotty	New Zealand	4
3	TJ Perenara	New Zealand	4
3	Julian Savea	New Zealand	4
7	Santiago Cordero	Argentina	3
7	Samu Kerevi	Australia	3
9	Adam Coleman	Australia	2
9	Dane Coles	New Zealand	2
9	Will Genia	Australia	2
9	Johan Goosen	South Africa	2
9	Bryan Habana	South Africa	2
9	Facundo Isa	Argentina	2
9	Joaquín Tuculet	Argentina	2
9	Warren Whiteley	South Africa	2

== See also ==
- History of rugby union matches between Argentina and Australia
- History of rugby union matches between Argentina and New Zealand
- History of rugby union matches between Argentina and South Africa
- History of rugby union matches between Australia and South Africa
- History of rugby union matches between Australia and New Zealand
- History of rugby union matches between New Zealand and South Africa
