= Ben Smith (rugby union) =

New Zealand rugby union player, born 1986

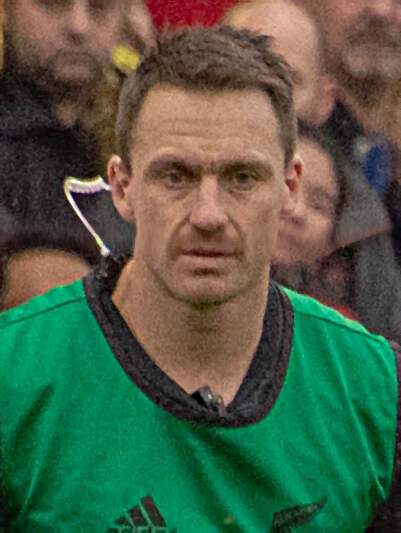
- Smith in 2018
- Full name: Benjamin Robert Smith
- Born: 1 June 1986 (age 40) Dunedin, New Zealand
- Height: 186 cm (6 ft 1 in)
- Weight: 93 kg (205 lb; 14 st 9 lb)
- School: King's High School

Rugby union career
- Position(s): Fullback, Wing, Centre
Senior career
Years	Team	Apps	(Points)
2007–2012	Otago	59	(75)
2009–2019	Highlanders	159	(205)
2019–2020	Pau	7	(0)
2021–2022	Kobelco Steelers	11	(10)
- Correct as of 10 August 2019
International career
Years	Team	Apps	(Points)
2007	New Zealand U21	1	(5)
2009–2019	New Zealand	84	(195)
- Correct as of 1 November 2019
National sevens team
Years	Team		Comps
2010	New Zealand		1
- Correct as of 10 August 2019
Medal record
Men's rugby sevens
Representing New Zealand
Commonwealth Games
Gold medal – first place	2010 Delhi	Team

Benjamin Robert Smith (born 1 June 1986) is a retired New Zealand rugby union player, currently working for Super Rugby side Highlanders' management team. He formerly played for the Highlanders in the Super Rugby competition, Otago in the ITM Cup, Pau in the Top 14 and Kobelco Steelers in the Japan Rugby League One.

Smith made his international debut for New Zealand in 2009, playing 84 tests from then until the 2019 Rugby World Cup. He was a key member of the 2015 Rugby World Cup-winning team. Smith was vice-captain of the All Blacks from 2016 to 2017 and captained the team once, against Samoa in 2017. He scored 39 tries for New Zealand throughout his international career, placing him amongst the all-time leading try scorers.

He normally played as an outside back, but has also previously played as a centre and halfback.

Smith holds the international record (tied with seven English) of winning 14 games in a season; he was the only All Blacks player to play every match of 2013 in which all games were won, signifying a perfect season.

== Provincial rugby ==
Born in Dunedin and educated at King's High School, Smith progressed through the junior ranks in the city at his beloved Green Island Rugby Club (The Grizzlies) before making his Air New Zealand Cup debut in 2008. He was one of the break-out stars of the 2009 Air New Zealand Cup, scoring six tries for Otago on route earning a year-end selection for the New Zealand national team (All Blacks). In the 2010 ITM Cup, however, he struggled to make the same impact as Otago endured a nightmare season and bottom-of-the-table finish, while Smith missed several matches while at the Commonwealth Games in India.

=== Super Rugby ===
Smith was selected to the Highlanders squad for the 2009 Super 14 season In 2010, Smith started every Highlander game, and scored two tries for the season. He played mainly on the wing, and earned one start at fullback while Israel Dagg was out injured.

Shifted back to his preferred position of fullback for the 2011 Super Rugby season, earned praise from coach Jamie Joseph and consideration for another All Blacks callup. He started every Highlander game for the third season running and added another two tries to his career total. In 2013 he continued as Highlanders fullback and was selected for the All Blacks to play on the wing against France. On 5 December 2013, Smith won the Super Rugby Player of the Year award for the 2013 Super Rugby season.

In May 2015 Smith played his 100th Super Rugby game against the Western Force.

In 2017, Smith played his 127th game for the Highlanders in their Round 15 22–25 loss to the Crusaders, equalling Anton Oliver's record for the most capped Highlander ever. Unfortunately, Smith was taken off the field early in the second half for a concussion test- which was failed, after tripping over All Blacks teammate Ryan Crotty.

Smith announced he would be departing the Highlanders to join Top 14 side Pau following the 2019 World Cup in Japan.

== Top 14 ==
Smith started playing for Section Paloise, commonly known as Pau, in December 2019. He received a red-card on his debut, his only sending off of his professional career. His time in France was subsequently disrupted by the Covid-19 pandemic.

Section Paloise announced Smith's departure in July 2020 with the former All Black heading to Japan.

== Japan Rugby League One ==
Kobe Steelers announced the signing of Smith ahead the 2021 Japan Rugby League One season on a one-year contract. Smith returned to play for the club in 2022 before announcing his retirement from rugby.

== International ==
=== Early career ===
In 2009 Smith was included in the 33-member All Blacks squad for the 2009 Autumn Internationals, ahead of veteran All Black winger Joe Rokocoko. Smith made his test debut for the All Blacks against Italy on 14 November 2009 at the San Siro, Milan, which the All Blacks won 20–6. He scored his first All Blacks try against the Barbarians in the last game of the tour which the Barbarians ran out winners 25–18 at Twickenham, London, on 5 December 2009.

Smith did not figure into All Black squads in 2010, but was selected for the rugby sevens squad which competed at the 2010 Commonwealth Games in Delhi, India, where he helped New Zealand to a gold medal finish.

=== 2012–2013 ===
Smith made ten test appearances for the All Blacks in 2012, eight of which were off the bench.

In June 2013, he played & featured in all 3 games against France in the French NZ Tour Series, on the right wing, with veteran Cory Jane ruled out due to injury. In the first game of the 3 Test Series at Auckland's Eden Park, he set up a try to Aaron Smith (in the 32nd minute) and was awarded man-of-the-match award. In the second game on 15 June at Christchurch's Rugby League Park, he scored a try in the 48th minute of the game. The final game of 3 Test Series, he again scored another in the 35th minute at New Plymouth's Yarrow Stadium. Smith would also form what would be a long-standing combination with fullback Israel Dagg during this series.

In August 2013, during the 2013 Rugby Championship, Smith scored 3 tries in the All Blacks 47–29 win against the Wallabies at Sydney's ANZ Stadium. The following week when the All Blacks faced the Wallabies at Wellington's Westpac Stadium, he scored 2 tries to help New Zealand win 27–16 and to retain the Bledisloe Cup.

In September 2013, Smith scored 2 tries to help the All Blacks win 33–15 against Argentina in La Plata.

In October 2013 following the close of the Rugby Championships, Smith was awarded with the record for the most tries in a Rugby Championship/Tri Nations series, scoring 8 tries in 6 matches. Smith continued this form into the end-of-year tests, scoring his eleventh test try of 2013 against Japan on 2 November that year, during a 54–6 win over the Japanese.

=== 2014–2015 ===
In 2014 Smith was named in the mid-year three-test series against England. Smith started on the right wing for the first test on 7 June 2014, in combination with Julian Savea on the left wing and Israel Dagg at fullback. Dagg was subbed off in the 54th minute due to injury, leaving Smith to start at fullback in the second test on 14 June 2014. Smith won Man of the Match in the second test of the series, a narrow 28–27 win, performing a try-saving tackle on English winger Manu Tuilagi and scoring a try in the 43rd minute.

Smith started at fullback in six of his 12 appearances for the All Blacks in 2014, with Dagg struggling with persistent injury.

On 30 August 2015, he was named as one of the 31 members of the New Zealand Rugby World Cup team. Smith was the only fullback selected in the squad, with Cory Jane and Israel Dagg dismissed for Smith's Highlanders team-mate Waisake Naholo.

Smith played in all seven of New Zealand's games at the 2015 Rugby World Cup, starting as fullback in all but one match (against Namibia, where he was substituted on for Colin Slade). He scored two tries in the competition, one against Namibia in their second pool match, and one against Tonga in their final pool game. He was awarded Man of the Match for his efforts in the semi-final against South Africa, which was won by a narrow 20–18.

In the final against Australia, he was yellow carded for a tip tackle, becoming the first player to receive a card in a Rugby World Cup Final. He returned to the pitch to help the All Blacks to a 34–17 victory, setting up replacement back Beauden Barrett for a try as the All Blacks became the first team ever to take back-to-back titles, as well as the first to win three Rugby World Cups.

=== 2016 ===
In 2016, after the international or complete retirements of All Black captain Richie McCaw, Dan Carter, Tony Woodcock, Keven Mealamu, All Blacks vice-captain Conrad Smith and Ma'a Nonu, Smith was named as the vice-captain of the All Blacks by Head Coach Steve Hansen, with number 8 Kieran Read succeeding Richie McCaw as captain.

Smith started his role as vice-captain on 11 June 2016 when the All Blacks beat Wales 39–21 in the first of the three-test series between the two countries. Smith was named as Man of the Match for the first test of the series and was not subbed off. Smith was shifted to right wing for the second test against Wales to accommodate for Israel Dagg who had returned from injury. The second test, a 36–22 win on 18 June 2016, was both Smith and Dagg's 50th test, with both players scoring tries. Smith was errorless in the second test with the exception of letting in Welsh lock Alun Wyn Jones in for a try, but did not win Man of the Match for the second week in a row, conceding the award to Dagg. Smith scored the opening try of the third test on 25 June 2016 and finished the series without being subbed off from the field, with the All Blacks thrashing Wales 46–6 to end the series.

Smith was moved back for fullback for the second round of the 2016 Rugby Championship with Dagg as the right wing. This would become the re-established combination between the two players, with Smith cementing his spot as the All Blacks' first-choice fullback. Those two players ended up finishing as highest try scorers in the competition, both having scored 5 tries across the 6 matches of the competition each. Smith's most notable involvement in the competition was on 10 September 2016 where he scored two tries against Argentina during a 57–22 win. Smith was not subbed off during the Rugby Championship, but the performances of himself and Dagg were overshadowed by that of Beauden Barrett, the new first-choice first-five-eighth for the All Blacks, who scored 81 points in the competition.

During the 2016 game vs Ireland in Dublin, Ben Smith provided cover at halfback while Aaron Smith was sin binned in the first half of the match. Smith was injured with a broken finger towards the end of the match, ending his international year as he was replaced by winger Waisake Naholo. Smith scored 8 tries throughout 2016, third-to-highest for the All Blacks behind new fly-half Beauden Barrett and Israel Dagg (the highest two international scorers for the year).

=== 2017 ===
Smith became the 68th captain of the All Blacks in the absence of Kieran Read, on 16 June 2017, as he recovered from a concussion sustained during Super Rugby to lead the All Blacks out against Samoa at Eden Park, as a warm-up for the three-test series against the touring British & Irish Lions team. Smith was subbed off for debutant Jordie Barrett in the 63rd minute, with lock Brodie Retallick taking over as captain for the rest of the test, which ended as a 78–0 win over Samoa.

Smith was named to start at fullback in the first test of the historic series against the Lions on 24 June 2017, but only lasted 21 minutes before receiving what was at the time, thought to have been his third concussion sustained in the space of three months. Smith was replaced by veteran first-five Aaron Cruden, with Beauden Barrett shifting to fullback and Israel Dagg staying on the right wing as the All Blacks beat the Lions 30-15 without Smith on the field. This test would be Smith's only ever fixture against the Lions, with Waisake Naholo, Jordie Barrett and Julian Savea deputising for him in the second and third tests. Smith was sorely missed during the series, as the Lions broke a number of records to draw the series 1–1 with the All Blacks.

After confirming that his vertigo was not a sign of concussion symptoms and instead caused by an inner ear infection, Smith announced that he would take a sabbatical from all forms of rugby following the second Bledisloe Cup test of 2017.

Smith was named in the All Blacks squad for the 2017 Rugby Championship, but would begin his sabbatical after the second Bledisloe Cup test. Smith scored tries in both Bledisloe Cup tests against the Wallabies during the Rugby Championship, making yet another career milestone from the right wing (rookie Damian McKenzie was used at fullback), as Smith scored his 30th try for the All Blacks in the second test on 26 August 2017, which the All Blacks won 35–29. His sabbatical started following the conclusion of this test, with Beauden Barrett named as All Blacks vice-captain in Smith's absence.

=== 2018–2019 ===
Smith made his return to international rugby after the 2018 Super Rugby season, scoring four tries from 12 tests in the 2018 season. Smith scored his 30th try for New Zealand on 9 June, in a 52–11 win over France, placing him amongst the all-time top try-scorers internationally.

Having played many 2018 tests on the right wing, Smith was again shifted back to his preferred position at fullback for New Zealand's opening test of 2019, a 20–16 win against Argentina, with Damian McKenzie not considered for selection due to injury. Smith started at fullback in the other two tests of the 2019 Rugby Championship, but Smith's poor performance in the first Bledisloe Cup test, saw New Zealand lose to Australia in a record 26–47 defeat, having already lost Scott Barrett to a red card.

In the second Bledisloe Cup test for 2019, Smith, as well as fellow poor-performing veterans, Owen Franks and Rieko Ioane, were axed from the match-day 23 altogether, with Beauden Barrett supplanting Smith as New Zealand's first-choice fullback, while rookie wingers, George Bridge and Sevu Reece, picked to start. Although Barrett had overtaken Smith in the pecking order, Smith was picked to start in his final home game in New Zealand, a 92–7 win over Tonga, scoring two tries in the game, having a far better performance.

Although there were calls from the media for Smith to be dropped, he was named for his second World Cup, having been picked by All Black Head Coach, Steve Hansen, as one of 31 players in New Zealand's squad for the 2019 Rugby World Cup. He played in all three tests during the pool stages of the World Cup, two as a replacement off the bench and starting at fullback against Namibia in a 71–9 victory, scoring two tries in the process of that victory.

Smith was not selected for the World Cup quarter-final win against Ireland, or the semi-final loss to England, having been surpassed by Sevu Reece and Beauden Barrett. With New Zealand's loss in the semi-final eliminating the team from the competition, Hansen chose to give Smith, as well as fellow retiring players, Kieran Read, Matt Todd, Sonny Bill Williams and Ryan Crotty their final test, in the Bronze Final against Wales. Smith had a standout performance, including two tries, against Wales, with New Zealand beating them 40–17, claiming third place in the 2019 World Cup.

=== 2022 ===
Ben made 2 appearances for an Otago regional touch team called Too Many Beers, in which he dominated proceedings and set up multiple tries which eventuated to 2 dominate wins. However, he did throw one "dusty nut" in which one particular team mate was highly disappointed in.

== Managerial career ==
Smith started his management career forking the Otago NPC Squad during the 2022 NPC season.

Following his playing career retirement, he subsequently joined Super Rugby side Highlanders' management team for the 2023 season. The former club co-captain worked as an advisor, focusing on the club's back three's counterattack.

=== International tries ===
Try	Opposing team	Location	Venue	Competition	Date	Result	Score
1	Ireland	Hamilton, New Zealand	Waikato Stadium	2012 Ireland rugby union tour of New Zealand	23 June 2012	Win	60 – 0
2	Scotland	Edinburgh, Scotland	Murrayfield Stadium	2012 end-of-year rugby union internationals	11 November 2012	Win	22 – 51
3	France	Christchurch, New Zealand	Rugby League Park	2013 France rugby union tour of New Zealand	15 June 2013	Win	30 – 0
4	France	New Plymouth, New Zealand	Yarrow Stadium	2013 France rugby union tour of New Zealand	22 June 2013	Win	24 – 9
5	Australia	Sydney, Australia	ANZ Stadium	2013 Rugby Championship	17 August 2013	Win	29 –47
6	Australia	Sydney, Australia	ANZ Stadium	2013 Rugby Championship	17 August 2013	Win	29 –47
7	Australia	Sydney, Australia	ANZ Stadium	2013 Rugby Championship	17 August 2013	Win	29 –47
8	Australia	Wellington, New Zealand	Westpac Stadium	2013 Rugby Championship	24 August 2013	Win	27 –16
9	Australia	Wellington, New Zealand	Westpac Stadium	2013 Rugby Championship	24 August 2013	Win	27 –16
10	Argentina	La Plata, Argentina	Estadio Ciudad de La Plata	2013 Rugby Championship	28 September 2013	Win	15 –33
11	Argentina	La Plata, Argentina	Estadio Ciudad de La Plata	2013 Rugby Championship	28 September 2013	Win	15 –33
12	South Africa	Johannesburg, South Africa	Ellis Park Stadium	2013 Rugby Championship	5 October 2013	Win	17–38
13	Japan	Tokyo, Japan	Chichibunomiya Rugby Stadium	2013 end-of-year rugby union internationals	2 November 2013	Win	6–54
14	England	Dunedin, New Zealand	Forsyth Barr Stadium	2014 England rugby union tour of New Zealand	14 June 2014	Win	28 –27
15	Argentina	La Plata, Argentina	Estadio Ciudad de La Plata	2014 Rugby Championship	27 September 2014	Win	13–34
16	South Africa	Johannesburg, South Africa	Ellis Park Stadium	2014 Rugby Championship	4 October 2014	Loss	27–25
17	South Africa	Johannesburg, South Africa	Ellis Park Stadium	2015 Rugby Championship	25 July 2015	Win	20–27
18	Namibia	London, England	Olympic Stadium	2015 Rugby World Cup	24 September 2015	Win	58 –14
19	Tonga	Newcastle, England	St. James' Park	2015 Rugby World Cup	9 October 2015	Win	47 –9
20	Wales	Wellington, New Zealand	Westpac Stadium	2016 Wales rugby union tour of New Zealand	18 June 2016	Win	36 –22
21	Wales	Dunedin, New Zealand	Forsyth Barr Stadium	2016 Wales rugby union tour of New Zealand	25 June 2016	Win	46 –6
22	Argentina	Hamilton, New Zealand	Waikato Stadium	2016 Rugby Championship	10 September 2016	Win	57 –22
23	Argentina	Hamilton, New Zealand	Waikato Stadium	2016 Rugby Championship	10 September 2016	Win	57 –22
24	South Africa	Christchurch, New Zealand	AMI Stadium	2016 Rugby Championship	17 September 2016	Win	41 –13
25	Argentina	Buenos Aires, Argentina	José Amalfitani Stadium	2016 Rugby Championship	1 October 2016	Win	17–36
26	South Africa	Durban, South Africa	Kings Park Stadium	2016 Rugby Championship	8 October 2016	Win	15–57
27	Ireland	Chicago, United States	Soldier Field	2016 end-of-year rugby union internationals	5 November 2016	Loss	40–29
28	Australia	Sydney, Australia	ANZ Stadium	2017 Rugby Championship	19 August 2017	Win	34–54
29	Australia	Dunedin, New Zealand	Forsyth Barr Stadium	2017 Rugby Championship	26 August 2017	Win	35–29
30	France	Auckland, New Zealand	Eden Park	2018 France rugby union tour of New Zealand	9 June 2018	Win	52–11
31	France	Wellington, New Zealand	Westpac Stadium	2018 France rugby union tour of New Zealand	16 June 2018	Win	26–13
32	France	Dunedin, New Zealand	Forsyth Barr Stadium	2018 France rugby union tour of New Zealand	23 June 2018	Win	49–14
33	Australia	Yokohama, Japan	Nissan Stadium	2018 end-of-year rugby union internationals	26 October 2018	Win	37–20
34	Tonga	Hamilton, New Zealand	Waikato Stadium	2019 Rugby World Cup warm-up matches	7 September 2019	Win	92 –7
35	Tonga	Hamilton, New Zealand	Waikato Stadium	2019 Rugby World Cup warm-up matches	7 September 2019	Win	92 –7
36	Namibia	Chōfu, Japan	Tokyo Stadium	2019 Rugby World Cup	6 October 2019	Win	71 –9
37	Namibia	Chōfu, Japan	Tokyo Stadium	2019 Rugby World Cup	6 October 2019	Win	71 –9
38	Wales	Chōfu, Japan	Tokyo Stadium	2019 Rugby World Cup	1 November 2019	Win	40–17
39	Wales	Chōfu, Japan	Tokyo Stadium	2019 Rugby World Cup	1 November 2019	Win	40–17

== Overseas club rugby ==
Smith played for the Old Colstonians club in Bristol, England in 2005 on a gap year after leaving King's High School and for Pau in 2019/20.

He then played for the Japan Rugby League One team, Kobelco Kobe Steelers

== Awards and honours ==
=== Super Rugby ===
- Super Rugby Centurion
- Super Rugby Champion - 2015

=== International rugby ===
- Rugby World Cup / Webb Ellis Cup
  - Winners: 2015
  - Third-place: 2019
- The Rugby Championship
  - Winners: 2012, 2013, 2014, 2016, 2017, 2018
  - Runners-up: 2015
- Bledisloe Cup
  - Winners: 2012, 2013, 2014, 2015, 2016, 2018, 2019
- Dave Gallaher Trophy
  - Winners: 2013 (2x), 2016, 2018
- Freedom Cup
  - Winners: 2012, 2013, 2014, 2015, 2016, 2018, 2019
- Killik Cup
  - Winners: 2009
- Hillary Shield
  - Winners: 2013, 2014 (2x), 2018
- British & Irish Lions series
  - Winners: 2017 (drawn series – shared title)
- World Rugby Player of the Year
  - Nominated: 2013
- World Rugby Team of the Year (New Zealand)
  - Winners: 2012, 2013, 2014, 2015, 2016, 2017
- Laureus Team of the Year (New Zealand)
  - Winners: 2016

== Personal life ==
Smith married Katie Menzies in 2015. Their daughter was born that year and their second child, son Walter was born on 9 March 2017 while Smith was out injured with concussion.
