= Ardie Savea =

NZ international rugby union player (born 1993)

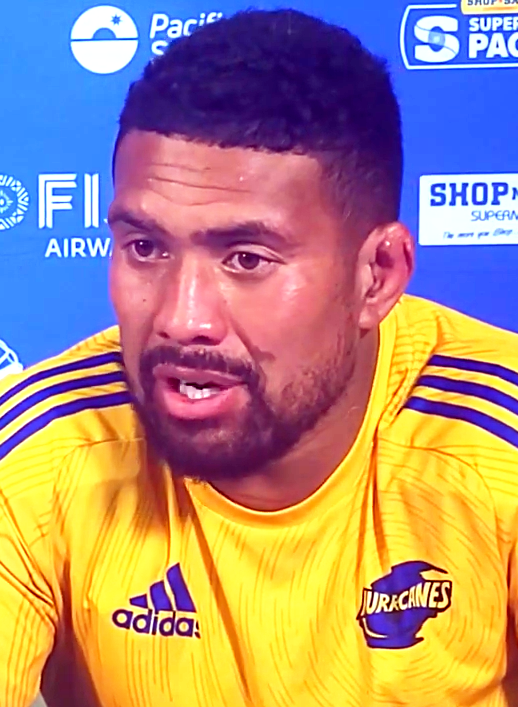
- Savea with the Hurricanes in 2023
- Full name: Ardie Suemalo Savea
- Born: 14 October 1993 (age 33) Wellington, New Zealand
- Height: 184 cm (6 ft 0 in)
- Weight: 105 kg (231 lb; 16 st 7 lb)
- School: Rongotai College
- Notable relative: Julian Savea (brother)

Rugby union career
- Position(s): Flanker, Number 8
- Current team: Wellington, Blues
Senior career
Years	Team	Apps	(Points)
2012–	Wellington	36	(85)
2013–2023	Hurricanes	131	(160)
2023–2024	Kobe Steelers	15	(40)
2025	Moana Pasifika	12	(35)
2025–2026	Kobe Steelers	18	(40)
2027–	Blues	0	(0)
- Correct as of 26 September 2026
International career
Years	Team	Apps	(Points)
2013	New Zealand U20	5	(5)
2016–	New Zealand	112	(175)
- Correct as of 14 September 2026
National sevens team
Years	Team		Comps
2012–2016	New Zealand		6
- Correct as of 16 July 2022
Medal record
Men's rugby union
Representing New Zealand
Rugby World Cup
Bronze medal – third place	2019 Japan	Squad
Silver medal – second place	2023 France	Squad

Ardie Suemalo Savea (born 14 October 1993) is a New Zealand professional rugby union player who plays as a number 8 or flanker for the Blues in Super Rugby and Wellington in the National Provincial Championship. He was named the 2023 World Rugby Player of the Year.

== Early life ==
Of Samoan descent, Savea was a member of the Rongotai College 1st XV, captain of the side in his final year of high school and was head prefect in his final year. Savea played as an outside centre at high school, shifting to the forwards in his professional career.

== Playing career ==
=== Early career ===
Savea has represented New Zealand on the international sevens circuit. In the 2013 Super Rugby season he joined the Hurricanes after signing a two-year deal.

In November 2013, Savea travelled with the All Blacks to Europe, along with his older brother Julian. This was because "we want to introduce him to the way of the All Black life," said Coach Steve Hansen. Savea was the first non-playing apprentice to be selected internationally for New Zealand, with future teammates of Savea, Jordie Barrett and Atunaisa Moli, being named as apprentices in 2016 and 2017 respectively.

=== 2015–2016 ===
In 2015, Savea was selected for the All Blacks Sevens squad to play in the Wellington 7s series in January 2016. Savea also became a regular starter for the Hurricanes during the 2015 Super Rugby season, but missed the final due to injury. After injury to Brad Shields, Savea took over as captain of Wellington for the rest of the 2015 ITM Cup season. Savea lead Wellington to the final of the Championship division in the absence of Shields, but Wellington lost the final to Hawke's Bay's Magpies, 25-26, with a late conversion from Savea's Hurricanes teammate Ihaia West.

In 2016, after opting to withdraw from the All Blacks Sevens, Savea was selected in New Zealand's All Blacks squad for the June test series against Wales. Savea made his debut for the All Blacks, replacing Sam Cane off the bench, on 11 June, against Wales at Eden Park. Savea made a fine debut, with the All Blacks winning 39-21. The following week, Savea scored a try in his second match for New Zealand at the Westpac Stadium, his home crowd. Savea again made his way onto the field by replacing Cane off the bench. The All Blacks won, again, by 36-22.

Savea was retained in the All Blacks squad for the 2016 Rugby Championship and following an injury to Sam Cane, Savea ended up playing 2 of the Rugby Championship tests as openside flanker. In his first start for the All Blacks against South Africa in the 2016 Rugby Championship, Ardie scored a try along with his brother Julian, making them the first brothers in the All Blacks to ever do so in the same test.

Savea played 12 tests for the All Blacks in his debut season overall, 10 of them off the bench.

=== 2017–2018 ===
Savea was one of the highest try-scorers for the 2017 Super Rugby season, scoring six that year including a double in the Hurricanes' opening match for the year within the first ten minutes. The Hurricanes won their opening match 83-17 against the Sunwolves, with Savea playing the full 80 minutes.

Savea was selected in the 33-man squad for the 2017 Pasifika Challenge against Samoa and the three-test series against the touring British and Irish Lions. Savea started at number 8, against Samoa, because All Blacks Captain Kieran Read had not yet recovered from his broken thumb. Savea scored two tries in the 78-0 demolition of Samoa and came off the bench as a replacement in all three tests against the Lions in a drawn series. Despite performing better than starting openside flanker Sam Cane, Savea was retained as an impact player off the bench for most of the 2017 Rugby Championship. A start against Argentina in New Plymouth was the exception, with Cane replacing Savea in the 44th minute of the 39-22 win. Despite a good performance, Savea's was overshadowed by Cane and by Vaea Fifita who was Man of the Match.

With Matt Todd preferred by All Black coach Steve Hansen during tests, Savea only made two appearances on the 2017 end-of-year tour, starting in wins over the Barbarians and a French XV.

Although the 2018 Super Rugby season proved to be a mixed season for Savea, Savea performed well against France during the mid-year Steinlager series, with his performance in the first two tests including an outstanding try. Due to Sam Cane's ongoing poor discipline, Savea earned a start at openside flanker during the final test of the series, on 23 June 2018. Although the All Blacks defeated France 49-14 in the third test, winning the series 3-0, it proved Savea to be luckless, with Savea coming off injured in the 16th minute, with Matt Todd replacing Savea. Savea missed the 2018 Super Rugby playoffs due to injury.

Savea recovered from his ankle injury in time for the 2018 Rugby Championship, replacing Sam Cane off the bench in both Bledisloe Cup tests against Australia. Savea's dominance over Australia earned him a start against Argentina's Los Pumas for round 3 of the competition, on 8 September 2018. Savea lasted the full 80 minutes against Los Pumas, with the All Blacks winning 46-24, but Savea only earned 12 minutes against South Africa's Springboks the following week. Although Savea only played for 12 minutes during the All Blacks' 34-36 shock loss to South Africa, he still played well and scored a try.

Savea was released by the All Blacks for the Wellington Lions during 2018, starring in a 52-7 win over Southland during the 2018 Mitre 10 Cup. This was his first fixture for Wellington since his All Black debut.

For round 5 of the 2018 Rugby Championship, with Kieran Read being rested, Savea was scheduled to be used as impact off the bench for the All Blacks as usual, with Luke Whitelock starting at number 8 in Read's absence, on 29 September 2018. Savea, however, was drafted into the starting lineup only hours before the test against Los Pumas, with Whitelock falling ill. Savea went on to dominate his opposite number 8, Javier Ortega Desio, winning the first "Man of the Match" award of his international career. Savea lasted the full 80 minutes, with the All Blacks beating Los Pumas 35-17. Savea played outstandingly the following week, in the second test against South Africa, when he replaced the injured Sam Cane only 36 minutes into the test. Savea challenged the Springboks as well as scored his seventh career try in the final minute. Savea's try was converted by first-five, Richie Mo'unga, who won the test for the All Blacks through the kick, making the final score a 32-30 win.

Savea became a regular starter for New Zealand during the 2018 end-of-year tour, with Sam Cane out injured with a fractured neck. Savea used his time as a regular starter to surpass Cane as a player, being one of the few players to shine for New Zealand in a narrow 16-15 win over England, and a 9-16 loss to Ireland. Savea played in the last test of the year, starting for the All Blacks in a 66-3 victory over Italy, before coming off in the 48th minute for newcomer, Dalton Papalii. Savea finished the year as one of the best-performing New Zealanders in the opinion of many, scoring three tries during the 2018 season, making him the highest try-scorer of any All Black forward for the season.

=== 2019 ===
Although the Hurricanes once again failed to progress to the final in the 2019 Super Rugby season, Savea was once again influential for the team, with the likes of former All Blacks, Josh Kronfeld and Sir Michael Jones praising Savea's consistent performances. Hurricanes teammate, Beauden Barrett, also referred to Savea as the All Blacks' "most influential player".

Despite the return of Sam Cane to playing rugby, from his broken neck, Savea was retained in New Zealand's starting lineup, although at Blindside Flanker, with Liam Squire opting to withdraw from the team. Savea played in four of New Zealand's five warm-up matches prior to the World Cup in 2019 and was not subbed off for another player in any, including a 92-7 victory over Tonga.

On 28 August, All Blacks Head Coach, Steve Hansen named Savea as one of 31 players in New Zealand's squad for the 2019 Rugby World Cup. He played in all three pool matches, but was one of few All Blacks who could hold their head high in their 7 - 19 semi-final defeat to England, scoring New Zealand's only try in the test after intercepting a botched line-out throw from English hooker Jamie George.

Although Savea did not play in the Bronze final against Wales due to injury, he was a nominee for World Rugby Player of the Year. Savea eventually lost out on the award to South African flanker, Pieter-Steph du Toit. With Savea's older brother, Julian Savea, having been a nominee for the award in 2014 and 2015, the Savea brothers became the first set of brothers with nominations for the award. He was also nominated for New Zealand rugby player of the year, beating out Beauden Barrett and Anton Lienert-Brown for the title. Savea also won Kelvin R Tremain Memorial player of the year.

=== 2023 ===
On 30 October 2023, Savea was named as the 2023 World Rugby Player of the Year.

=== List of international test tries ===
Try	Date	Venue	Opponent	Result	Competition
1	18 June 2016	Westpac Stadium, Wellington, New Zealand	Wales	22–36 (won)	2016 mid-year internationals
2	17 September 2016	AMI Stadium, Christchurch, New Zealand	South Africa	41–13 (won)	2016 Rugby Championship
3-4	16 June 2017	Eden Park, Auckland, New Zealand	Samoa	78–0 (won)	2017 June rugby union tests
5	9 June 2018	Eden Park, Auckland, New Zealand	France	52–11 (won)	2018 June rugby union tests
6	15 September 2018	Westpac Stadium, Wellington, New Zealand	South Africa	34–36 (lost)	2018 Rugby Championship
7	6 October 2018	Loftus Versfield Stadium, Pretoria, South Africa	South Africa	30–32 (won)	2018 Rugby Championship
8	7 September 2019	Waikato Stadium, Hamilton, New Zealand	Tonga	92–7 (won)	2019 Rugby World Cup warm-up matches
9	26 October 2019	International Stadium Yokohama, Yokohama, Japan	England	19–7 (lost)	2019 Rugby World Cup
10	18 October 2020	Eden Park, Auckland, New Zealand	Australia	27–7 (won)	2020 end-of-year internationals
11	28 November 2020	McDonald Jones Stadium, Newcastle, Australia	Argentina	38–0 (won)	2020 Rugby Championship
12	17 July 2021	Waikato Stadium, Hamilton, New Zealand	Fiji	60–13 (won)	2021 mid-year internationals
13	14 August 2021	Eden Park, Auckland, New Zealand	Australia	57–22 (won)	2021 Rugby Championship
14	2 October 2021	Cbus Super Stadium, Gold Coast, Australia	South Africa	31–29 (lost)	2021 Rugby Championship
15	20 November 2021	Stade de France, Saint-Denis, France	France	40–25 (lost)	2021 autumn internationals
16-17	2 July 2022	Eden Park, Auckland, New Zealand	Ireland	42–19 (won)	2022 mid-year internationals
18	3 September 2022	Waikato Stadium, Hamilton, New Zealand	Argentina	53–3 (won)	2022 Rugby Championship
19	5 November 2022	Millennium Stadium, Cardiff, Wales	Wales	55–23 (won)	2022 autumn internationals
20	8 July 2023	Estadio Malvinas Argentinas, Mendoza, Argentina	Argentina	41–12 (won)	2023 Rugby Championship
21-22	29 September 2023	OL Stadium, Lyon, France	Italy	96–17 (won)	2023 Rugby World Cup
24	14 October 2023	Stade de France, Saint-Denis, France	Ireland	24–28 (won)	2023 Rugby World Cup
25	6 July 2024	Forsyth Barr Stadium, Dunedin, New Zealand	England	16–15 (won)	2024 England tour of New Zealand
26	19 July 2024	Snapdragon Stadium, San Diego, United States	Fiji	47–5 (won)	2024 mid-year rugby union internationals
27	17 August 2024	Eden Park, Auckland, New Zealand	Argentina	42–10 (won)	2024 Rugby Championship
28	21 September 2024	Stadium Australia, Sydney, Australia	Australia	28–31 (won)	2024 Rugby Championship
29	12 July 2025	Wellington Regional Stadium, Wellington, New Zealand	France	43–17 (won)	2025 France tour of New Zealand
30	16 August 2025	Estadio Mario Alberto Kempes, Córdoba, Argentina	Argentina	24–41 (won)	2025 Rugby Championship
31	1 November 2025	Soldier Field, Chicago, United States	Ireland	13–26 (won)	2025 end-of-year rugby union internationals
32	18 July 2026	Eden Park, Auckland, New Zealand	Ireland	40–21 (won)	2026 Nations Championship
33	29 August 2026	Cape Town Stadium, Cape Town, South Africa	South Africa	33–26 (lost)	2026 Greatest Rivalry Series
34- 35	5 September 2026	FNB Stadium, Johannesburg, South Africa	South Africa	29–24 (lost)	2026 Greatest Rivalry Series

Updated: 14 September 2026

== Personal life ==
His older brother is his former Hurricanes and All Blacks teammate Julian, who previously played as a wing for the Hurricanes. Savea is of Samoan heritage, hailing from the villages of Siumu, Luatuanuu, and Faleasiu Uta. Savea is a father-of-three, having married his partner, Saskia, in 2018.

Outside his rugby career, Savea runs a namesake clothing company, alongside his wife, and is an advocate for mental health.

== Awards and honours ==
Hurricanes

- Super Rugby: 2016

Kobe Steelers

- Japan Rugby League One: 2025–26

New Zealand

- Rugby World Cup: 2019 (third place), 2023 (runners-up)
- The Rugby Championship: 2016, 2017, 2018, 2020, (Note: The 2020 edition of the Rugby Championship did not include usual participants South Africa, largely due to logistical challenges and other issues stemming from the COVID-19 pandemic.) 2021, 2022, 2023
- Bledisloe Cup: 2016, 2017, 2018, 2019, 2020, 2021, 2022, 2023, 2024, 2025

Individual

- World Rugby Player of the Year: 2019 (nominee), 2023
- World Rugby Dream Team of the Year: 2021, 2023
- All Blacks Player of the Year: 2019, 2021, 2022, 2023, 2025
- Kelvin R. Tremain Player of the Year: 2019, 2023, 2025
- Super Rugby Pacific Player of the Year: 2025
- Super Rugby Pacific Team of the Year: 2025
- Super Rugby Player of the Year: (Note: This award is for New Zealand players within New Zealand Super Rugby clubs.) 2016 (nominee), 2019, 2022 (nominee)
- Japan Rugby League One Best XV: 2023–24, 2025–26
- Billy Wallace Best and Fairest: 2012
- World Rugby Breakthrough Player of the Year: 2016 (nominee)
- World Rugby Junior Player of the Year: 2013 (nominee)
- Wellingtonian of the Year: 2024
