= Ryan Crotty =

New Zealand rugby union player (born 1988)

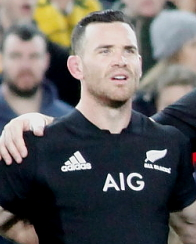
- Crotty playing for New Zealand, August 2017
- Full name: Ryan Stevenson Crotty
- Born: 23 September 1988 (age 38) Nelson, New Zealand
- Height: 181 cm (5 ft 11 in)
- Weight: 96 kg (212 lb; 15 st 2 lb)
- School: Shirley Boys' High School

Rugby union career
- Position: Centre
Senior career
Years	Team	Apps	(Points)
2008–2024	Canterbury	85	(90)
2009–2019, 2024	Crusaders	156	(127)
2019–2023	Kubota Spears	34	(25)
- Correct as of March 19, 2025
International career
Years	Team	Apps	(Points)
2007	New Zealand U19	3	(10)
2008	New Zealand U20	5	(5)
2009	Junior All Blacks	3	(5)
2013–2019	New Zealand	48	(60)
2015	Barbarian F.C.	2	(5)
- Correct as of March 19, 2025
Coaching career
- Years: Team
- 2025–: Crusaders (assistant coach)

Ryan Stevenson Crotty (born 23 September 1988) is a New Zealand-born former rugby union Rugby player. Crotty has previously played for the Crusaders in the Super Rugby competition and Canterbury in the ITM Cup, captaining both teams. He is currently an assistant coach for the Crusaders in Super Rugby.

== Playing career ==
=== Early career ===
Crotty was selected for the New Zealand Under 20 rugby team in 2008. This team included Crotty's future All Blacks team-mates Aaron Smith, Ben Afeaki and Sam Whitelock as well as future Scottish international player Sean Maitland and future Australian international player Toby Smith. This team went on to win the 2008 IRB Junior World Championship. Crotty debuted for Canterbury later that year and was signed to the Crusaders for the 2009 season after a string of standout performances.

He was one of seven uncapped players selected for the All Blacks' 28-man squad to compete in the 2013 Rugby Championship after injury to fellow uncapped back Francis Saili. Crotty made his international debut for New Zealand in the 47–29 win against Australia in Sydney on 17 August 2013, replacing veteran Ma'a Nonu off the bench in the 62nd minute. Crotty was selected for the 2013 end-of-year tour and used as a replacement off the bench in all four tests on tour. He scored his first international try on 24 November 2013 in a narrow 24–22 win against Ireland, four minutes into injury time to secure a 100% match winning year for the team, with Crotty's try converted by first-five Aaron Cruden. This made the All Blacks the first team in the professional era to go a calendar year unbeaten.

In the 2014 Super Rugby season, Crotty took over as captain of the Crusaders for many of the games due to regular captain Kieran Read being injured. He was retained in the All Blacks' 2014 squad and made his first international start on 23 August 2014, in the second Bledisloe Cup test against the Wallabies during the 2014 Rugby Championship. Crotty was replaced by Malakai Fekitoa at halftime with the All Blacks going on to win 51–20. Crotty made two starts on the 2014 end-of-year tour, lasting the full 80 minutes in both which were victories, 74–6 over the US and 24–16 over Scotland. Crotty finished the 2014 having played eight tests for the All Blacks that year.

=== 2015–2016 ===
Crotty only made two test appearances for the All Blacks in 2015 including a start against Samoa on 8 July 2015, which was won 25–16. Crotty missed out on selection for the 2015 Rugby World Cup, with Sonny Bill Williams and Malakai Fekitoa selected as backups to Ma'a Nonu and Conrad Smith at the expense of Crotty.

After the retirements of Nonu and Smith in 2015, Crotty was re-selected for New Zealand in 2016, and was named as the starting inside centre for the first test match of the year against Wales. Crotty went on to start in all three tests against Wales in the mid-year series, with the All Blacks winning the series 3–0. Since the Wales series Crotty has become a regular starter for the All Blacks, starting in all of the games he played throughout 2016, with two separate injuries preventing him playing three games that year. Crotty was one of the highest try-scorers of the 2016 Rugby Championship, scoring 4 tries in the competition. This included two tries in the first test against Argentina on 10 September 2016 which New Zealand won by 57–22. Crotty suffered a knee injury in the All Blacks' historic 29–40 loss to Ireland in Chicago on 5 November 2016 and was subbed off only 26 minutes in and replaced by Malakai Fekitoa. Crotty returned from injury on 26 November to start in the final test of the year, partnering rookie Anton Lienert-Brown in the midfield as the All Blacks beat France 24–19 to end their 2016 season. Crotty ended the 2016 season having played 11 tests for the All Blacks that year and started in all of his international appearances.

=== 2017 ===
Crotty was named as one of the two Crusaders vice-captains alongside Matt Todd, with Sam Whitelock named as captain by new head coach Scott Robertson in 2017. Crotty played his 100th Super Rugby match in the title-winning season and won the Award for Man of the Match in the final against the Lions on 5 August 2017 in Cape Town as the Crusaders beat the Lions 25–17.

Crotty returned from injury to start at outside centre in the first test against the touring British and Irish Lions side on 24 June 2017 but was subbed off following only 33 minutes on the field due to a repeated hamstring injury which had already caused him to miss the Crusaders vs Lions fixture of the tour. The All Blacks won the first test 30-15 and Crotty did not play for the rest of the Lions tour, which the two teams drew 1-1.

Crotty only made 8 appearances for the All Blacks in 2017 due to having much injury trouble. He started in all of his international appearances that year at outside centre, partnering Sonny Bill Williams in the midfield after Williams missed the 2016 season due to a torn achilles tendon sustained at the Olympics. Crotty continued his fantastic form from the 2017 Super Rugby playoffs into the 2017 Rugby Championship where he scored two tries in the first half of the first Bledisloe Cup test against the Wallabies on 19 August 2017. Crotty's second try was scored on the halftime whistle and after it was converted by Beauden Barrett, the All Blacks lead at halftime 40–6. Crotty was subbed off in the 49th minute for Anton Lienert-Brown. The All Blacks did not score any more points after Crotty was subbed off, with his contribution being missed very much. Crotty won Man of the Match as the All Blacks won against the Wallabies 54–34. After missing tests against Argentina in order to allow rookie Ngani Laumape test experience, Crotty scored his third try of the Championship on 7 October as the All Blacks narrowly beat the Springboks 25–25 in Cape Town.

Crotty started in all three tests on the 2017 end-of-year tour and scored the 2000th test try in the All Blacks' history when they beat France 38–18 on 11 November 2017, with Crotty sprinting over the line in the 35th minute to chase down a kick from Sonny Bill Williams. The 2017 season ended in disappointment for Crotty after an average performance against Scotland as well as the following week when he was subbed off only 19 minutes into the All Blacks' 33–18 win over Wales on 25 November 2017 for a concussion test. Crotty did not return to the field that day and was replaced by Anton Lienert-Brown who had a standout performance.

=== 2018 ===
Crotty was subbed off from the field against the Hurricanes on 10 March 2018, suffering his second concussion in the space of 6 months. The Crusaders went on to lose to the Hurricanes 19–29 in Crotty's absence. This was not Crotty's only injury through 2018, as he was subbed from the field only 12 minutes into the All Blacks' first Bledisloe Cup test of 2018, having accumulated a sixth concussion in the space of 18 months. Crotty's ongoing injuries saw many media outlets call for his retirement.

Having ignored media speculation on retirement, Crotty returned to feature in New Zealand's shock 34–36 loss to South Africa during the latter stages of the 2018 Rugby Championship, also going on to start in the following victories over Argentina, South Africa and Australia.

Although Crotty had managed to get consistent game-time going, following his struggles with injury, Crotty was benched in the end-of-year test against England, with Sonny Bill Williams making his own return from injury to start at second-five, while Crotty's Crusaders teammate, Jack Goodhue, was returning from illness to start at centre. Although this was the case, Williams left the field injured late in the first half, with Crotty making immediate impact, setting up Damian McKenzie for New Zealand's only try against England in their 16–15 win. Crotty played one more test in 2018, which was a 9–16 loss to Ireland.

=== 2019 ===
In 2019, Crotty confirmed that he would leave New Zealand at the end of the 2019 Rugby World Cup, to play for a Funabashi-based team, the Kubota Spears, in the Japanese Top League. This would mean the 2019 Super Rugby season was Crotty's last. Crotty played his 150th game for the Crusaders on 8 June, kicking a goal to convert his last-minute try against the Melbourne Rebels, to celebrate his achievement, as well as the 66–0 win.

Picking up yet another injury in the Super Rugby semi-final, Crotty, as well as his Crusaders team-mate, Scott Barrett, were not considered for selection in the 2019 Rugby Championship.

Crotty returned from injury and played his first Mitre 10 Cup game for Canterbury since 2015. This was also his final game for Canterbury. Crotty scored two tries, but only played in the first half, with Canterbury beating Southland 80–0.

On 28 August 2019, All Blacks Head Coach, Steve Hansen, named Crotty as one of 31 players in New Zealand's squad for the 2019 Rugby World Cup. Crotty's selection was somewhat controversial, with the in-form Ngani Laumape missing out on a spot in the squad.

After scoring two tries against Tonga in a 92-7 warm-up match, Crotty went on to feature in two pool-stage tests at the World Cup. Having been axed from the match-day 23 altogether for the playoffs, Crotty returned to New Zealand's starting XV for the Bronze Final against Wales, with Crotty's teammates losing the semi-final to England. Crotty started in the Bronze Final, against Wales, with long-term midfield partner, Sonny Bill Williams, as well as fellow retiring players, Kieran Read, Ben Smith and Matt Todd. Crotty scored a try shortly after half-time in the test, with himself and Williams replaced by Anton Lienert-Brown and Jordie Barrett, Crotty finished his international career with a 40–17 win over Wales.

== Honours ==
New Zealand

- Rugby World Cup / Webb Ellis Cup
  - Third-place: 2019
