= Anton Lienert-Brown =

New Zealand rugby union player

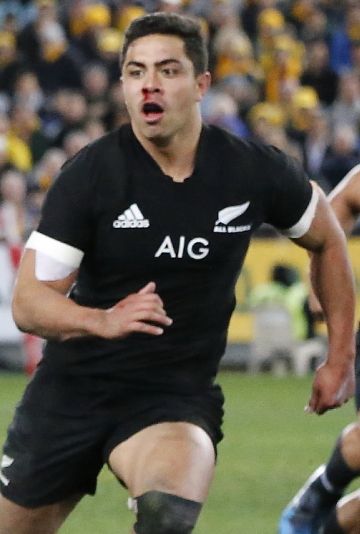
- Lienert-Brown representing New Zealand during the Rugby Championship
- Full name: Anton Russell Lienert-Brown
- Born: 15 April 1995 (age 31) Christchurch, New Zealand
- Height: 1.85 m (6 ft 1 in)
- Weight: 96 kg (212 lb; 15 st 2 lb)
- School: Christchurch Boys' High School
- Notable relative: Daniel Lienert-Brown (brother)

Rugby union career
- Position: Centre
- Current team: Chiefs, Waikato
Senior career
Years	Team	Apps	(Points)
2014–2025 2027–	Chiefs	126	(115)
2014–	Waikato	25	(20)
2025–2026	Kobelco Steelers	18	(25)
- Correct as of 25 September 2026
International career
Years	Team	Apps	(Points)
2014–2015	New Zealand U20	9	(15)
2016–	New Zealand	96	(85)
- Correct as of 21 November 2026
Medal record
Men's rugby union
Representing New Zealand
Rugby World Cup
Silver medal – second place	2023 France	Team competition
Bronze medal – third place	2019 Japan	Team competition

Anton Russell Lienert-Brown (born 15 April 1995) is a New Zealand rugby union player who plays as a centre for the Chiefs in Super Rugby and Waikato in the Bunnings NPC.

== Club career ==
Lienert-Brown began his career in Christchurch, where he caught the eye with some excellent performances for Christchurch Boys' High School in the 2012 South Island finals. This began a rapid ascent for the young second five-eighth who was in line to be part of the Waikato squad for the 2013 ITM Cup until a shoulder injury ruled him out. Nonetheless 2012 and 2013 Super Rugby champions the Chiefs included him in their 2014 squad as part of the franchise's wider training group.

He made his Super Rugby debut on 29 March 2014 in a 34–34 draw against the Bulls in Pretoria. Starting the game in an unfamiliar role on the wing, he was replaced by Tim Nanai-Williams in the 51st minute.

After Charlie Ngatai was ruled out for the rest of Super Rugby with a serious concussion, Lienert-Brown became a regular starter for the Chiefs in the 2016 Super Rugby season.

The 2019 Super Rugby season proved to be a brilliant return to form for Lienert-Brown, who, despite playing 11 tests during the season, had a quiet 2018, having been usurped by Jack Goodhue in the national pecking order. Lienert-Brown's performances for the Chiefs throughout 2019 were outstanding, allowing the Chiefs to make the playoffs despite a rollercoaster season. Lienert-Brown, who made more offloads than any other player throughout the season, was subsequently selected for the 2019 Rugby Championship.

During the 2022 Super Rugby Pacific season, Lienert-Brown played four games for the Chiefs before acquiring a shoulder injury. He required surgery which ruled him out for six months and the rest of the Super Rugby Pacific season and for most of the International season with the All Blacks.

== International career ==
Lienert-Brown was called into the All Blacks' Rugby Championship squad for the injured Sonny Bill Williams, making his debut in the starting line up against Australia in Wellington on 27 August 2016, following concussion to Ryan Crotty. Lienert-Brown had a great game and set up winger Israel Dagg for a try off the first touch in his international career. Lienert-Brown lasted nearly the whole 80 minutes before being replaced by Chiefs team-mate Seta Tamanivalu in the 76th minute.

Lienert-Brown replaced Crotty off the bench in home victories over Argentina and South Africa, before overtaking Malakai Fekitoa as Crotty's midfield partner in the absence of Williams. Lienert-Brown established this when he made the second start of his career in the second test against Argentina on 1 October 2016, scoring the opening try (the first of his international career) and lasting the whole 80 minutes of the All Blacks' 36–17 victory. Lienert-Brown started another five times in 2016, scoring the second try of his international career in the third Bledisloe Cup test against Australia before being replaced by Fekitoa in the 62nd minute of the All Blacks' 37–10 win over the Wallabies. Lienert-Brown was not subbed off in any of his three appearances on the 2016 end-of-season tour.

Lienert-Brown was selected in the All Blacks' 33-man squad for the 2017 Pasifika Challenge against Samoa and three-test series against the touring British and Irish Lions. Lienert-Brown started in the midfield with Sonny Bill Williams in the 78–0 victory over Samoa and scored the first New Zealand try of 2017 11 minutes into the test. With Ryan Crotty returning from a hamstring injury, Lienert-Brown was relegated to the bench for the first test against the Lions. This happened only for Crotty to repeat his hamstring injury in the 33rd minute with Lienert-Brown replacing Crotty off the bench. The All Blacks won the test 30–15. Lienert-Brown started in the second and third test against the Lions, setting up midfielder-turned fullback Jordie Barrett for his first test try. The All Blacks went on to draw the third test 15-15, leaving the series drawn overall. Lienert-Brown played the full 80 minutes in both the second and third test.

Lienert-Brown spent the 2017 All Blacks season as an on-off regular starter, replacing another player off the bench eight times and starting for the All Blacks six times in 2017. His 2017 season included a try-scoring performance in his start against Argentina on 9 September 2017, as well as an outstanding performance against Wales in the final test of 2017 where he also scored a try off a pass from winger and man-of-the match Rieko Ioane in the 33–18 victory.

New Zealand had a shaky start to their 2019 season, with Lienert-Brown starting in the All Blacks' record 26–47 loss to Australia, their joint-heaviest defeat of all time, with Lienert-Brown scoring one try of New Zealand's four. However, the team stepped up significantly for the second Bledisloe Cup test in 2019, with Lienert-Brown winning Man of the Match in the 36-0 thrashing at Eden Park.

On 28 August, All Blacks Head Coach, Steve Hansen named Lienert-Brown as one of 31 players in New Zealand's squad for the 2019 Rugby World Cup. Having already accumulated 38 caps since his debut, Lienert-Brown's form supplanted 50-test veteran, Sonny Bill Williams, his childhood hero, from New Zealand's starting lineup, starting alongside Ryan Crotty in the first test of the World Cup, a 23–13 win over South Africa.

Following the Chiefs' winless 2020 Super Rugby Aotearoa season, Lienert-Brown was selected in the North Island side for the first North vs South Island clash since 2012. Lienert-Brown was paired in midfield with Rieko Ioane, who went on to start in the first All Blacks test of 2020, at the expense of Lienert-Brown. Though he was benched for Ioane in the first Bledisloe Cup test of 2020, Lienert-Brown went on to start in the 13 jersey for all five of New Zealand's remaining tests, in a shortened season due to COVID-19 pandemic.

Lienert-Brown's 50th test was his first of the 2021 season, this game finished as a 60–13 win against Fiji. Though he missed some tests due to injuries in 2021, Lienert-Brown was still able to score 3 tries from 7 tests in the season.

== Personal life ==
Lienert-Brown's older brother, Daniel, is also a professional rugby player, currently playing for the Highlanders in Super Rugby. He is of Samoan ancestry.

In 2019, Lienert-Brown opened up about struggles with mental health, citing them as difficulties in his past. In 2021, Lienert-Brown started an RTD beverage brand named "Grins", with his former Chiefs teammates, Damian McKenzie and Stephen Donald.

== Honours ==
New Zealand

- 1× Rugby World Cup third place: 2019
