= Julian Savea =

NZ international rugby union player

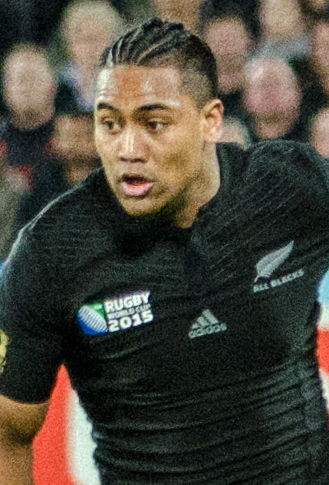
- Savea representing New Zealand at the 2015 Rugby World Cup, September 2015
- Full name: Sio Julian Savea
- Born: 7 August 1990 (age 36) Wellington, New Zealand
- Height: 192 cm (6 ft 4 in)
- Weight: 103 kg (227 lb; 16 st 3 lb)
- School: Rongotai College
- Notable relative: Ardie Savea (brother)

Rugby union career
- Position(s): Wing, Centre
- Current team: Wellington
Senior career
Years	Team	Apps	(Points)
2010–2017, 2020–	Wellington	82	(145)
2011–2018, 2021–2023	Hurricanes	153	(305)
2018–2020	Toulon	41	(45)
2024–2026	Moana Pasifika	19	(15)
- Correct as of 23 June 2026
International career
Years	Team	Apps	(Points)
2010	New Zealand U20	4	(40)
2012–2017	New Zealand	54	(230)
2017	Barbarian F.C.	1	(0)
- Correct as of 1 October 2025
National sevens team
Years	Team		Comps
2009	New Zealand		5
- Correct as of 22 October 2022
Medal record
Men's Rugby union
Representing New Zealand
Rugby World Cup
Gold medal – first place	2015 England	Squad

Sio Julian Savea (born 7 August 1990) is a New Zealand former professional rugby union player and current coach. He played as a wing or centre for Wellington in the National Provincial Championship. Savea formerly played for Toulon in the Top 14 and the Hurricanes and Moana Pasifika in Super Rugby. Between 2012 and 2017, he won 54 caps for New Zealand.

He has also represented New Zealand at sevens and at under-20 level. Savea is nicknamed "The Bus", a moniker bestowed by under-20s coach Dave Rennie. Savea was a key member of 2015 Rugby World Cup winning team, and was the highest try scorer of the tournament, with 8 tries. Savea is one of the highest try-scorers in New Zealand's history, scoring 46 through the duration of his international career.

Savea was nominated for World Rugby Player of the Year in 2014 and 2015, winning the award for Try of the Year in 2015.

== Early career ==
Savea attended Rongotai College in Wellington, New Zealand. In 2008, Savea made the New Zealand secondary schools team and the Hurricanes academy squad. In 2009, Savea debuted for the New Zealand sevens at the 2009 Adelaide Sevens. In 2010, Savea was selected for the New Zealand U-20 team to play at the 2010 IRB Junior World Championship in Argentina. He scored 8 tries in the tournament which New Zealand won and was named IRB Junior Player of the year. Savea was rewarded for his good form by being picked in the 2010 Wellington Lions squad to play in the 2010 ITM Cup. In 2010 Savea was touted as 'the next Jonah Lomu'.

== Domestic career ==
=== Hurricanes ===
In 2012, Savea played in his second season for the Hurricanes. While he had a quiet 2011 season, his 2012 form earned him a call-up into the All Blacks for the three-test series with Ireland.

Savea had a poor season in 2016 and was benched for the Hurricanes' last 3 matches of the season in the knockout rounds, with Jason Woodward, former All Black Cory Jane and James Marshall the team's preferred back three players by the end of the season. Savea was also benched for the semi-final against the Lions in Johannesburg the following year after Vince Aso returned from injury. Savea had been quiet all season, with Wes Goosen replacing him as the starting left wing for the draw to the Lions.

Savea scored 50 tries for the Hurricanes during his Super Rugby career, which ended in 2018 after his signing to Toulon. Savea played 116 games for the Hurricanes during his Super Rugby career and is one of the most-capped Super Rugby players in history. Savea played his final game for the Hurricanes during the 2018 Super Rugby season's semi-final, against the Crusaders, on 28 July when the Crusaders knocked the Hurricanes out of the competition, with the Hurricanes losing 12-30.

=== Wellington Lions ===
He marked his first-class debut in July 2010 with a length of the field runaway try that clinched an ITM Cup pre-season win for the Wellington Lions over Canterbury. He started on the right wing in 12 of 14 ITM Cup games, scoring a further eight tries including a try on championship debut against Tasman and two more the following week against Otago.

Savea was not selected for the All Blacks for the 2017 Rugby Championship, therefore played his first game for Wellington in four years on the right wing as a result. Following an injury to Brad Shields, Savea took over the team as captain until Shields returned from injury.

In summer of 2023 Savea signed with Moana Pasifika, a team competing in the Super Rugby championship. With the team being defunct at the end of the 2026 Super Rugby season, Savea opted not to join his brother to move to Auckland Blues, but to become the coach for head coach of North Harbour premier club Mahurangi.

== International career ==
=== All Blacks ===
Savea was named in the 2012 All Black squad, his first season of international rugby. On 9 June 2012, Savea scored three tries on his debut for the All Blacks against Ireland in the first test at Eden Park. He is the first All Black to score three tries against Ireland in a test match, and the fourth to score three tries on his All Black test debut. Since his debut, Savea has been one of the most prolific tryscorers in international rugby.

Savea became a regular starter for the All Blacks across his first few years. In 2014, Savea was nominated for World Rugby's Player of the Year award, which was ultimately won by teammate Brodie Retallick.

Savea was named in the 31-man All Black squad for the 2015 Rugby World Cup, where he scored 8 tries across the tournament having played in many games throughout the tournament. Savea's 8 tries saw him equal the record for most tries in a single tournament, previously achieved by the late former All Black Jonah Lomu and South Africa's Bryan Habana. Two of these games played saw Savea score hat-tricks, including a quarter-final game against France. The hat-trick Savea scored against France saw him being compared to Lomu. Savea, having been one of the best-performing players of the tournament, was again nominated for World Rugby's "Player of The Year" award which was won by teammate Dan Carter, and was also the winner of "Try of The Year" for one of his tries against France in the World Cup.

Despite continuing to score tries in 2016, Savea was seriously out of form. When Waisake Naholo was injury-free he was selected over Savea as the starting left wing, with Israel Dagg on the right wing. Savea continued to start internationally due to injuries to Naholo and Nehe Milner-Skudder, the latter of whom did not play internationally all year due to a shoulder reconstruction surgery. Savea came off the bench to become the fifth New Zealander to score 40 tries in international rugby when he touched down against Australia in Sydney on 20 August 2016. Savea was the fastest to do so, as this was his 44th match. He overtook former All Black wing Joe Rokocoko's record of 40 tries from 46 tests as the All Blacks won against the Wallabies 42-8.

On 16 June 2017, Savea charged his way over the chalk against Samoa marking his 46th test try during the 78-0 win. This made Savea the second-highest try scorer of any All Black, tying with Rokocoko and former All Blacks fullback Christian Cullen.

Savea lost his starting spot in the All Blacks to rookie Blues wing Rieko Ioane for the first two tests against the British and Irish Lions in 2017, but started in the third test on 8 July 2017, for his final appearance in the black jersey, following injury to Waisake Naholo and Ioane having illness. Savea played badly, botching a potential try and being exploited on defence.

After poor performances across the 2016 and 2017 seasons, Savea was dropped from the All Blacks squad for the 2017 Rugby Championship when the team was named on his 27th birthday, with Ioane, Naholo and Hurricanes team-mate Nehe Milner-Skudder all recovering from injury and illness.

Despite numerous injuries to the All Blacks' outside backs in the 2017 season, Savea was not re-called for international rugby, with Seta Tamanivalu, David Havili and Matt Duffie preferred as injury cover for the 2017 end-of-season tour squad over Savea. This prompted Savea to play for the Barbarians Club against his former All Blacks team-mates on 5 November 2017. Savea played the full 80 minutes for the Barbarians but failed to make an impact, with Crusaders winger and Barbarians team-mate George Bridge overshadowing Savea and scoring two tries as the Barbarians lost 22-31 to the All Blacks, who featured Savea's younger brother Ardie Savea.

=== International tries ===
Try	Opponent	Location	Venue	Competition	Date	Result
1, 2, 3	Ireland	Auckland, New Zealand	Eden Park	Mid-year rugby test series	9 June 2012	Won
4	Argentina	Wellington, New Zealand	Westpac Stadium	Rugby Championship	8 September 2012	Won
5, 6	Argentina	La Plata, Argentina	Estadio Ciudad de La Plata	Rugby Championship	29 September 2012	Won
7, 8	Scotland	Edinburgh, Scotland	Murrayfield Stadium	End-of-year rugby test series	11 November 2012	Won
9, 10	Italy	Rome, Italy	Stadio Olimpico	End-of-year rugby test series	17 November 2012	Won
11, 12	England	London, England	Twickenham Stadium	End-of-year rugby test series	1 December 2012	Lost
13	France	Christchurch, New Zealand	AMI Stadium	Mid-year rugby test series	15 June 2013	Won
14	Argentina	Hamilton, New Zealand	Waikato Stadium	Rugby Championship	7 September 2013	Won
15	Argentina	La Plata, Argentina	Estadio Ciudad de La Plata	Rugby Championship	29 September 2013	Won
16	Australia	Dunedin, New Zealand	Forsyth Barr Stadium	End-of-year rugby test series	19 October 2013	Won
17, 18	England	London, England	Twickenham Stadium	End-of-year rugby test series	16 November 2013	Won
19	Ireland	Dublin, Ireland	Aviva Stadium	End-of-year rugby test series	24 November 2013	Won
20	England	Dunedin, New Zealand	Forsyth Barr Stadium	Mid-year rugby test series	14 June 2014	Won
21, 22, 23	England	Hamilton, New Zealand	Waikato Stadium	Mid-year rugby test series	21 June 2014	Won
24	Australia	Auckland, New Zealand	Eden Park	Rugby Championship	23 August 2014	Won
25, 26	Argentina	Napier, New Zealand	McLean Park	Rugby Championship	6 September 2014	Won
27	Argentina	La Plata, Argentina	Estadio Ciudad de La Plata	Rugby Championship	27 September 2014	Won
28, 29	United States	Chicago, USA	Soldier Field	End-of-year rugby test series	2 November 2014	Won
30	Wales	Cardiff, Wales	Millennium Stadium	End-of-year rugby test series	23 November 2014	Won
31, 32	Namibia	London, England	London Stadium	2015 Rugby World Cup	24 September 2015	Won
33, 34, 35	Georgia	Cardiff, Wales	Millennium Stadium	2015 Rugby World Cup	2 October 2015	Won
36, 37, 38	France	Cardiff, Wales	Millennium Stadium	2015 Rugby World Cup	17 October 2015	Won
39	Wales	Auckland, New Zealand	Eden Park	Mid-year rugby test series	11 June 2016	Won
40	Australia	Sydney, Australia	ANZ Stadium	Rugby Championship	20 August 2016	Won
41	Australia	Wellington, New Zealand	Westpac Stadium	Rugby Championship	27 August 2016	Won
42	Argentina	Hamilton, New Zealand	Waikato Stadium	Rugby Championship	10 September 2016	Won
43	South Africa	Christchurch, New Zealand	AMI Stadium	Rugby Championship	17 September 2016	Won
44, 45	Australia	Auckland, New Zealand	Eden Park	End-of-year rugby test series	22 October 2016	Won
46	Samoa	Auckland, New Zealand	Eden Park	Mid-year rugby test series	16 June 2017	Won

=== New Zealand U20 ===
Julian Savea was named the 2010 IRB Junior Player of the Year. He was the star of the IRB World U20 tournament, scoring eight tries in three games; he scored four tries in one match against Samoa, and two each against Wales and South Africa. Savea featured on the right wing for New Zealand in the 2010 World U20 tournament.

=== New Zealand Sevens ===
Savea debuted for the New Zealand Sevens team at the 2009 Dubai Sevens, and played in the Sevens tournaments at Hong Kong, Adelaide, London and Scotland.

== Honours ==
=== Team ===
Hurricanes 2016 champion New Zealand 2015 world champion

=== Individual ===
IRB Player of the Year - Nominee - 2014, 2015

== Personal life ==
Savea is of Samoan descent. His younger brother Ardie is also a Hurricanes and All Blacks player.

In April 2013 Savea was charged over a domestic violence incident involving his partner. The charges were later withdrawn after Savea completed police diversion. Savea had previously appeared on posters for an anti-domestic violence campaign, 'It's Not OK'.

In December 2015, Savea married his girlfriend of 3 years, Fatima. The couple announced via Instagram that they were expecting their first child in December 2017. Their daughter, Jude Telesia Savea was born on 7 December 2017.
