= Javier Ortega Desio =

Argentine rugby union player

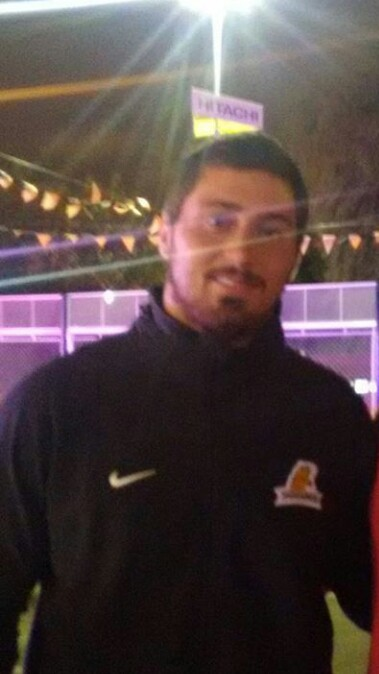
- Ortega Desio in 2017
- Born: Javier Ortega Desio; 14 June 1990 (age 36) Paraná, Entre Ríos, Argentina
- Height: 193 cm (6 ft 4 in)
- Weight: 102 kg (16 st 1 lb; 225 lb)

Rugby union career
- Position: Flanker
Amateur team(s)
Years	Team	Apps	(Points)
2009–2013	SIC	44	(50)
2014–	Paraná		
Senior career
Years	Team	Apps	(Points)
2013–2015	Pampas XV	19	(10)
2021−	Jaguares XV		
Super Rugby
Years	Team	Apps	(Points)
2016–2020	Jaguares	48	(20)
International career
Years	Team	Apps	(Points)
2009	Argentina U19		
2010	Argentina U20	8	(0)
2012–2020	Argentina XV	8	(0)
2012–	Argentina	54	(25)
- Correct as of 18 September 2019
National sevens team
Years	Team		Comps
2011–2012	Argentina sevens		13

Javier Ortega Desio (born 14 June 1990) is an Argentine rugby union player who plays as a loose forward for the Argentine Super Rugby side Jaguares, and the Argentina national rugby union team.

== Career ==
Ortega Desio started out his professional career playing for the San Isidro Club in the Torneo de la URBA. He spent 4 years there and racked up almost 50 appearances before switching to join Estudiantes de Paraná in his home town in 2014.

Ortega Desio is signed to play for Jaguares until 2017.

== International career ==
Ortega Desio was a member of the Argentina Under-20 sides which competed in the 2010 IRB Junior World Championship and later went on to play for Argentina's representative teams, the Jaguars and the Pampas XV. He was a member of the Pampas XV squad for the 2013 Vodacom Cup in South Africa and he also went on their tour of Australia in 2014.

He made his senior debut for Los Pumas against Uruguay on 20 May 2012, scoring a try in the process. However, it wasn't until 2014 before he tasted action against non-South American opposition where he played in all 3 of his country's matches during the 2014 mid-year rugby union internationals series.

In August 2014, he was named in the squad for the 2014 Rugby Championship.
