= Malakai Fekitoa =

NZ & Tonga international rugby union player

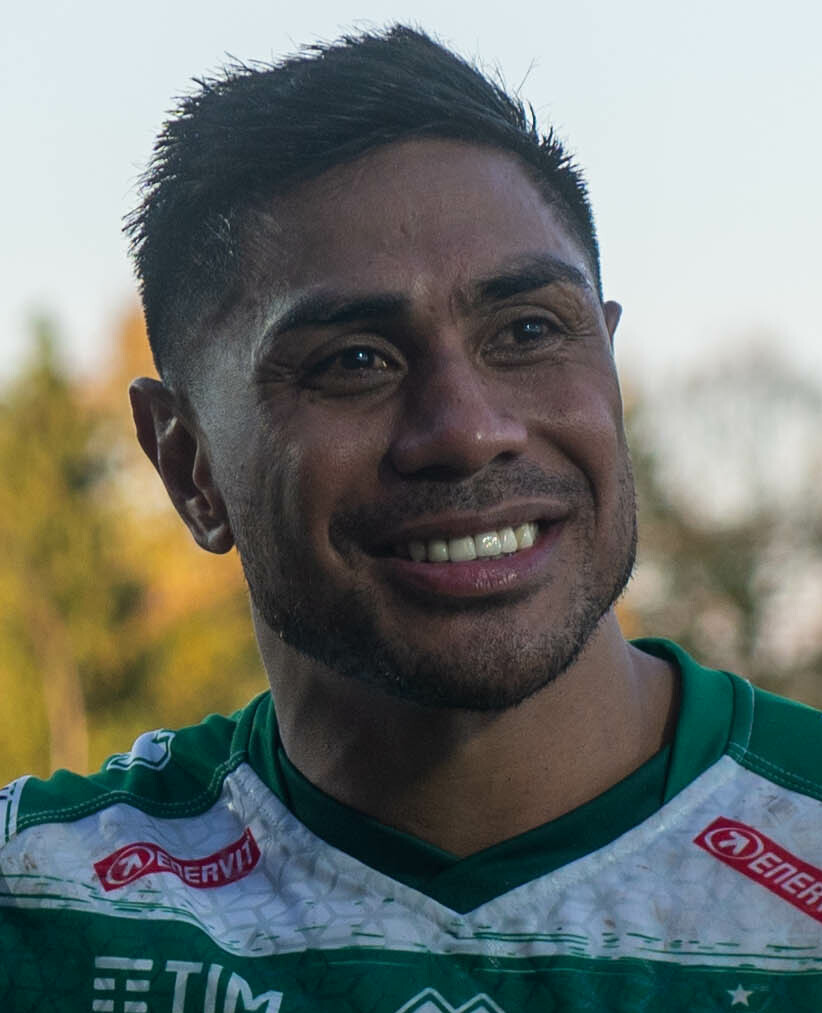
- Fekitoa representing Benetton in 2023
- Full name: Malakai Fonokalafi Fekitoa
- Born: 10 May 1992 (age 34) Ha'apai, Tonga
- Height: 1.80 m (5 ft 11 in)
- Weight: 100 kg (220 lb; 15 st 10 lb)
- School: Tonga College; Liahona High School; Wesley College

Rugby union career
- Position(s): Centre, Wing
- Current team: Benetton
Senior career
Years	Team	Apps	(Points)
2012–2017	Auckland	29	(30)
2013–2014	Blues	6	(10)
2014–2017	Highlanders	65	(100)
2017–2019	Toulon	39	(50)
2019–2022	Wasps	48	(35)
2022–2023	Munster	19	(10)
2023–2026	Benetton	46	(30)
- Correct as of 23 January 2024
International career
Years	Team	Apps	(Points)
2014–2017	New Zealand	24	(40)
2022–	Tonga	12	(0)
- Correct as of 19 July 2024
National sevens team
Years	Team		Comps
2021	Tonga		1 (4pts)
- Correct as of 23 January 2024

Malakai Fonokalafi Fekitoa (born 10 May 1992) is a Tongan professional rugby union player who plays as a centre for United Rugby Championship club Benetton and the Tonga national team.

== Early life ==
Fekitoa was born in Haʻapai, Tonga. The son of a carpenter and Meleane Fekitoa, he is the eighth of eight boys and seven girls. After playing for Tonga 7s on a tour of New Zealand, he was offered a rugby scholarship and enrolled at Wesley College.

== Club career ==
Fekitoa made his debut for Auckland in the ITM Cup in 2012, making 12 appearances and scoring 3 tries, and was signed by the Blues for the 2013 season. He only made one appearance in 2013 for the Blues against France, and signed with the Highlanders for the 2014 Super Rugby season. He was a key member of the Highlanders title winning-side in 2015. In July 2017, Fekitoa confirmed that he had signed a two-year contract with French Top 14 side Toulon. In January 2019, it was announced that Fekitoa had signed for English Premiership Rugby side Wasps from the beginning of the 2019–20 season.

Fekitoa moved to Ireland to join United Rugby Championship club Munster on a two-year contract from the 2022–23 season, and made his senior competitive debut for the province in their 20–13 defeat away to Welsh side Cardiff in round one of the 2022–23 United Rugby Championship on 17 September 2022. Fekitoa featured off the bench in Munster's historic 28–14 win against a South Africa XV in Páirc Uí Chaoimh on 10 November 2022. He left Munster upon the conclusion of the 2022–23 season, despite having signed a two-year contract. In his final game for the province, Fekitoa started in Munster's 19–14 win against the Stormers in the final of the 2022–23 United Rugby Championship on 27 May 2023.

Fekitoa joined Italian United Rugby Championship club Benetton on a three-year contract from the 2023–24 season. He made his debut in Round 2 of the 2023–24 season against Munster.

== International career ==
=== New Zealand ===
Fekitoa became eligible for selection for New Zealand after completing three years post-education residency in New Zealand. After completing his residency period, he was selected in the New Zealand squad for the June 2014 test series against England, with coach Steve Hansen having signalled interest in him during the Super Rugby season. He made his debut as a replacement player in first test of that series, a 20–15 win. With first-choice centre Conrad Smith injured out of the third and final test of the series, Fekitoa moved into the starting XV. His performance earned praise, with the Herald on Sunday saying that "the All Blacks coach has found the most elegant of solutions for Conrad Smith's back-up, one who carries more of an attacking threat than the veteran centre".

Fekitoa was selected again in 2014 for the New Zealand squad for the Rugby Championship. He was originally named as a reserve for the first test against Australia, but with Conrad Smith's wife expecting, Fekitoa was called up into the starting XV. He was a member of the 2015 Rugby World Cup-winning New Zealand side.

Fekitoa became a regular starter for the All Blacks in 2016, combining with Ryan Crotty to form the midfield partnership for the Wales series in June. Fekitoa began to experience very erratic form, and did not play against Argentina and South Africa that year. He lost his starting spot to Anton Lienert-Brown, coming off the bench for the final Bledisloe Cup test and the first Ireland fixture that year. Fekitoa re-gained his starting spot for the next two tests due to Crotty being injured, with Lienert Brown moving to inside centre so that Fekitoa could play outside centre. Fekitoa scored 2 tries in two games, against Italy and Ireland. Fekitoa was yellow carded for a dangerous tackle against Ireland, so was cited and suspended for the final test match of the year.

Fekitoa was not initially selected for the All Blacks in 2017 for the British & Irish Lions tour but was called up for the third test match after Sonny Bill Williams was issued a red card in the second test match. Fekitoa played his final test match for New Zealand on 8 July 2017 in the final test against the Lions, coming off the bench to replace Ngani Laumape.

=== Tonga ===
In 2022, Fekitoa was selected in the Tongan squad for the 2022 Pacific Nations Cup, having become eligible after World Rugby's eligibility rules were amended to allow for players to switch national allegiance after completing a stand-down period. He made his debut for Tonga on 2 July 2022, in a 36–0 loss to Fiji. He played in 3 matches in the Rugby World Cup 2023 with a 59% tackle success.

== Honours ==
=== Fundraising ===
Following the 2022 Hunga Tonga–Hunga Ha'apai eruption and tsunami, Fekitoa, whose family still lives in Tonga, set up a fundraising appeal to provide aid, raising in excess of £50,000. Wasps, Fekitoa's club at the time, supported his fundraising effort by donating 20% of the match ticket revenue from their fixture against Saracens on 30 January 2022.

Munster

- 1× United Rugby Championship: 2023

New Zealand

- 1× Rugby World Cup: 2015
