= 2021 Rugby Championship =

Southern hemisphere rugby union tournament

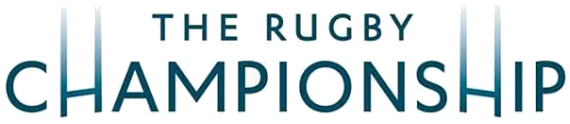
- Date: 14 August – 2 October 2021
- Countries: Argentina; Australia; New Zealand; South Africa

Final positions
- Champions: New Zealand (18th title)
- Bledisloe Cup: New Zealand
- Freedom Cup: New Zealand
- Mandela Challenge Plate: Australia
- Puma Trophy: Australia

Tournament statistics
- Matches played: 12
- Tries scored: 64 (5.33 per match)
- Attendance: 275,317 (22,943 per match)
- Top scorer(s): Handré Pollard (66)
- Most tries: Andrew Kellaway (7)

The 2021 Rugby Championship (Note: Known for sponsorship reasons as The Castle Rugby Championship in South Africa, The Fortinet Rugby Championship in New Zealand, The eToro Rugby Championship in Australia, and The Zurich Rugby Championship in Argentina.) was the ninth series of the annual southern-hemisphere competition, involving Argentina, Australia, New Zealand and South Africa. The Springboks returned to the tournament after a year out in 2020 due to South African government travel restrictions and player welfare and safety concerns related to COVID-19. The tournament returned to its normal window of August, kicking-off on 14 August and concluding on 2 October.

== Background ==
=== Travel disruptions ===
With continued restrictions relating to the COVID-19 pandemic, most of the tournament was staged in Australia and New Zealand, with South Africa also hosting two games - their two matches against Argentina in the opening two rounds.

On 3 August, the original schedule was altered due to travel restrictions imposed in New Zealand, meaning the first and second tests between Australia and New Zealand (Bledisloe 2 & 3) were reversed and rearranged, and New Zealand would play at Eden Park instead of Wellington Regional Stadium. The restrictions also meant that New Zealand would not host their tests against Argentina, and were eventually played in Australia.

On 24 August, it was announced that all games in Rounds 3–6 would be hosted in Queensland, Australia. This came after COVID restrictions in New Zealand meant South Africa (and Argentina who were already set to play the All Blacks at a neutral venue) were unable to travel to New Zealand. In addition, due to the uncertainty over the original scheduled for the Championship, the All Blacks also delayed their travel to Australia for their round 2 clash in Perth.

=== New laws trialed ===
The 2021 Rugby Championship became the first international competition to include the new World Rugby global rugby laws trials, designed to support the priority mission of head impact reduction and potential welfare advancements across the game. For some of the law adaptions, they had previously been trialed at Super Rugby level in Australia and New Zealand; the goal-line drop out and the 50:22, whilst the others are new to help reduce injury risk at the breakdown. In addition, outside the World Rugby global law trials, this years Rugby Championship will also trial a 20-minute red card which like the goal-line drop out and 50:22, had been used in Australia and New Zealand respective Super Rugby tournaments. The championship was won by New Zealand after the 19-17 win against South Africa on 25 September.

== Table ==
Pos	Team	Pld	W	D	L	PF	PA	PD	TF	TA	TB	LB	Pts
1	New Zealand (C)	6	5	0	1	218	104	+114	28	10	4	1	25
2	Australia	6	4	0	2	160	163	−3	19	21	2	0	18
3	South Africa	6	3	0	3	152	128	+24	12	10	1	2	15
4	Argentina	6	0	0	6	60	195	−135	5	23	0	0	0

Source: SANZAAR
(C) Champion

== Fixtures ==
=== Round 1 ===
14 August 2021
19:05 NZST (UTC+12)

(1 BP) New Zealand	57–22	Australia
Try: Ioane 3' c Retallick 23' c Savea 32' c Taylor (2) 46' c, 59' m Reece 53' c Jordan 64' c Havili 80+2' c Con: Mo'unga (5/6) 5', 24', 34', 47', 54'; B. Barrett (2/2) 65', 80+3'; Pen: McKenzie (1/1) 52'	Report	Try: Kellaway (2) 7' m, 68' c McDermott 39' c Con: Lolesio (2/3) 69', 40'; Pen: Lolesio (1/1) 30'

Eden Park, Auckland
Attendance: 25,121
Referee: Brendon Pickerill (New Zealand) (Note: Non-neutral match official team due to continued travel restrictions into New Zealand.)

New Zealand

Australia

FB	15	Damian McKenzie		(substituted off) 56'
RW	14	Will Jordan
OC	13	Rieko Ioane
IC	12	David Havili
LW	11	Sevu Reece
FH	10	Richie Mo'unga		(substituted off) 63'
SH	9	Aaron Smith		(substituted off) 67'
N8	8	Ardie Savea	(yellow card) 41' to 51'	(substituted off) 70'
OF	7	Dalton Papalii
BF	6	Akira Ioane
RL	5	Sam Whitelock (c)
LL	4	Brodie Retallick		(substituted off) 61'
TP	3	Nepo Laulala		(substituted off) 61'
HK	2	Codie Taylor		(substituted off) 61'
LP	1	George Bower		(substituted off) 52'
Replacements:
HK	16	Samisoni Taukei'aho		(substituted on) 61'
PR	17	Karl Tu'inukuafe		(substituted on) 52'
PR	18	Angus Ta'avao		(substituted on) 61'
LK	19	Scott Barrett		(substituted on) 61'
FL	20	Luke Jacobson		(substituted on) 70'
SH	21	TJ Perenara		(substituted on) 67'
FH	22	Beauden Barrett		(substituted on) 63'
FB	23	Jordie Barrett		(substituted on) 56'
Coach:
Ian Foster

FB	15	Tom Banks
RW	14	Andrew Kellaway
OC	13	Hunter Paisami	(substituted off) 65'
IC	12	Matt To'omua
LW	11	Marika Koroibete	(substituted off) 67'
FH	10	Noah Lolesio
SH	9	Tate McDermott	(substituted off) 65'
N8	8	Rob Valetini
OF	7	Michael Hooper (c)
BF	6	Lachlan Swinton	(substituted off) 61'
RL	5	Matt Philip
LL	4	Darcy Swain	(substituted off) 49'
TP	3	Allan Alaalatoa	(substituted off) 52'
HK	2	Brandon Paenga-Amosa	(substituted off) 57'
LP	1	James Slipper	(substituted off) 48'
Replacements:
HK	16	Jordan Uelese	(substituted on) 57'
PR	17	Scott Sio	(substituted on) 48'
PR	18	Taniela Tupou	(substituted on) 52'
LK	19	Lukhan Salakaia-Loto	(substituted on) 49'
N8	20	Harry Wilson	(substituted on) 61'
SH	21	Nic White	(substituted on) 65'
CE	22	Len Ikitau	(substituted on) 65'
CE	23	Reece Hodge	(substituted on) 67'
Coach:
Dave Rennie

Assistant referees:
Paul Williams (New Zealand)
Mike Fraser (New Zealand)
Television match official:
Glenn Newman (New Zealand)

Notes:

- New Zealand scored their most points against Australia in a Test match, surpassing their previous record of 54 set in 2017.
- New Zealand retain the Bledisloe Cup.

14 August 2021
17:05 SAST (UTC+02)

(1 BP) South Africa	32–12	Argentina
Try: Reinach 14' c Fassi 18' m Hendrikse 78' m Con: E. Jantjies (1/2) 15'; Pen: E. Jantjies (5/5) 2', 23', 37', 47', 58'	Report	Pen: Sánchez (4/4) 17', 35', 40', 43'

Nelson Mandela Bay Stadium, Port Elizabeth
Attendance: 0 (behind closed doors)
Referee: Andrew Brace (Ireland)

South Africa

Argentina

FB	15	Damian Willemse
RW	14	Sbu Nkosi
OC	13	Jesse Kriel
IC	12	François Steyn
LW	11	Aphelele Fassi
FH	10	Elton Jantjies	(substituted off) 72'
SH	9	Cobus Reinach	(substituted off) 72'
N8	8	Jasper Wiese	(substituted off) 62'
BF	7	Kwagga Smith
OF	6	Siya Kolisi (c)	(substituted off) 53'
RL	5	Lood de Jager
LL	4	Eben Etzebeth	(substituted off) 67'
TP	3	Wilco Louw	(substituted off) 44'
HK	2	Joseph Dweba	(substituted off) 44'
LP	1	Ox Nché	(substituted off) 51'
Replacements:
HK	16	Malcolm Marx	(substituted on) 44'
PR	17	Trevor Nyakane	(substituted on) 51'
PR	18	Vincent Koch	(substituted on) 44'
LK	19	Marvin Orie	(substituted on) 67'
FL	20	Marco van Staden	(substituted on) 53'
FL	21	Dan du Preez	(substituted on) 62'
SH	22	Jaden Hendrikse	(substituted on) 72'
FH	23	Morné Steyn	(substituted on) 72'
Coach:
Jacques Nienaber

FB	15	Santiago Carreras
RW	14	Bautista Delguy
OC	13	Santiago Chocobares
IC	12	Jerónimo de la Fuente	(substituted off) 53'
LW	11	Matías Moroni
FH	10	Nicolás Sánchez	(substituted off) 66'
SH	9	Felipe Ezcurra	(substituted off) 53'
N8	8	Rodrigo Bruni
OF	7	Facundo Isa	(substituted off) 58'
BF	6	Pablo Matera
RL	5	Marcos Kremer	(substituted off) 51'
LL	4	Guido Petti
TP	3	Francisco Gomez Kodela	(substituted off) 58'
HK	2	Julián Montoya (c)	(substituted off) 72'
LP	1	Nahuel Tetaz Chaparro	(substituted off) 58'
Replacements:
HK	16	Facundo Bosch	(substituted on) 72'
PR	17	Carlos Muzzio	(substituted on) 58'
PR	18	Santiago Medrano	(substituted on) 58'
LK	19	Tomas Lavanini	(substituted on) 51'
LK	20	Matias Alemanno	(substituted on) 58'
SH	21	Gonzalo Bertranou	(substituted on) 53'
FH	22	Domingo Miotti	(substituted on) 66'
WG	23	Sebastián Cancelliere	(substituted on) 53'
Coach:
Mario Ledesma

Assistant referees:
Karl Dickson (England)
AJ Jacobs (South Africa)
Television match official:
Tom Foley (England)

Notes:

- Herschel Jantjies (South Africa) had been named on the bench but withdrew ahead of the game due to injury and was replaced by Jaden Hendrikse.
- Joseph Dweba and Jaden Hendrikse (South Africa) and Carlos Muzzio (Argentina) made their International debuts.

=== Round 2 ===
21 August 2021
17:05 SAST (UTC+02)

Argentina	10–29	South Africa
Try: Matera 80+5' c Con: Sanchez (1/1) 80+5'; Pen: Miotti (1/3) 24'	Report	Try: Mapimpi 45' c Marx 51' c Con: Pollard (2/2) 46', 52'; Pen: Pollard (5/5) 10', 17', 22', 29', 32'

Nelson Mandela Bay Stadium, Port Elizabeth
Attendance: 0 (behind closed doors)
Referee: Karl Dickson (England)

Argentina

South Africa

FB	15	Juan Cruz Mallía
RW	14	Ignacio Mendy
OC	13	Santiago Chocobares
IC	12	Jerónimo de la Fuente		(substituted off) 56'
LW	11	Santiago Carreras
FH	10	Domingo Miotti		(substituted off) 59'
SH	9	Gonzalo Bertranou		(substituted off) 77'
N8	8	Rodrigo Bruni	(yellow card) 31' to 41'	(substituted off) 48'
OF	7	Guido Petti		(substituted off) 65'
BF	6	Pablo Matera
RL	5	Tomás Lavanini	(yellow card) 80'
LL	4	Matías Alemanno
TP	3	Francisco Gomez Kodela		(substituted off) 53'
HK	2	Julián Montoya (c)		(substituted off) 72'
LP	1	Nahuel Tetaz Chaparro		(substituted off) 53'
Replacements:
HK	16	Facundo Bosch		(substituted on) 72'
PR	17	Facundo Gigena		(substituted on) 53'
PR	18	Santiago Medrano		(substituted on) 53'
LK	19	Marcos Kremer		(substituted on) 49'
FL	20	Juan Martín González		(substituted on) 65'
SH	21	Felipe Ezcurra		(substituted on) 77'
FH	22	Nicolás Sánchez		(substituted on) 59'
CE	23	Lucio Cinti		(substituted on) 56'
Coach:
Mario Ledesma

FB	15	Willie le Roux	(substituted off) 65'
RW	14	Cheslin Kolbe
OC	13	Lukhanyo Am
IC	12	Damian de Allende
LW	11	Makazole Mapimpi
FH	10	Handré Pollard
SH	9	Cobus Reinach	(substituted off) 65'
N8	8	Jasper Wiese	(substituted off) 50'
BF	7	Franco Mostert
OF	6	Siya Kolisi (c)
RL	5	Lood de Jager	(substituted off) 62'
LL	4	Marvin Orie	(substituted off) 50'
TP	3	Thomas du Toit	(substituted off) 53'
HK	2	Malcolm Marx	(substituted off) 53'
LP	1	Trevor Nyakane	(substituted off) 12'
Replacements:
HK	16	Bongi Mbonambi	(substituted on) 53'
PR	17	Steven Kitshoff	(substituted on) 12'
PR	18	Frans Malherbe	(substituted on) 53'
LK	19	Nico Janse van Rensburg	(substituted on) 50'
FL	20	Kwagga Smith	(substituted on) 62'
FL	21	Dan du Preez	(substituted on) 50'
SH	22	Jaden Hendrikse	(substituted on) 65'	(substituted off) 73'
FH	23	Damian Willemse	(substituted on) 65'
Coach:
Jacques Nienaber

Assistant referees:
Marius van der Westhuizen (South Africa)
AJ Jacobs (South Africa)
Television match official:
Tom Foley (England)

Notes:

- Lucio Cinti and Ignacio Mendy and Nico Janse van Rensburg (South Africa) made their international debuts.
- Lood de Jager (South Africa) earned his 50th test cap.
- No replacement was issued for Jaden Hendrikse.

5 September 2021 (Note: Original date was 28 August, however the match was postponed to 5 September 2021.)
14:00 AWST (UTC+08)

Australia	21–38	New Zealand (1 BP)
Try: Fainga'a 49' c White 65' c Banks 78' c Con: Lolesio (1/1) 50'; Hodge (2/2) 66', 79'	Report	Try: J. Barrett 16' c Havili (2) 39' m, 60' m Jordan 54' m Lienert-Brown 68' m Bridge 71' m Con: B. Barrett (1/4) 17'; Pen: B. Barrett (2/2) 8', 14'

Perth Stadium, Perth
Attendance: 52,724
Referee: Damon Murphy (Australia) (Note: Non-neutral match official team due to continued travel restrictions into Australia)

Australia

New Zealand

FB	15	Tom Banks
RW	14	Andrew Kellaway
OC	13	Len Ikitau	(substituted off) 64'
IC	12	Samu Kerevi
LW	11	Marika Koroibete
FH	10	Noah Lolesio	(substituted off) 62'
SH	9	Tate McDermott	(substituted off) 64'
N8	8	Rob Valetini
OF	7	Michael Hooper (c)	(substituted off) 22'	(substituted on) 31'	64' to 66'
BF	6	Lachlan Swinton				(substituted off) 66'
RL	5	Matt Philip	(substituted off) 64'
LL	4	Darcy Swain
TP	3	Allan Alaalatoa	(substituted off) 56'
HK	2	Folau Fainga'a	(substituted off) 64'
LP	1	James Slipper	(substituted off) 56'
Replacements:
HK	16	Lachlan Lonergan	(substituted on) 64'
PR	17	Angus Bell	(substituted on) 56'
PR	18	Taniela Tupou	(substituted on) 56'
LK	19	Izack Rodda	(substituted on) 64'
FL	20	Pete Samu	(substituted on) 22'	(substituted off) 31'	(substituted on) 64'
SH	21	Nic White	(substituted on) 64'
CE	22	Reece Hodge	(substituted on) 62'
CE	23	Jordan Petaia	(substituted on) 64'
Coach:
Dave Rennie

FB	15	Jordie Barrett	(red card) 27'	(substituted off) 47'
RW	14	Will Jordan		(substituted off) 69'
OC	13	Anton Lienert-Brown
IC	12	David Havili
LW	11	Rieko Ioane
FH	10	Beauden Barrett
SH	9	Brad Weber		(substituted off) 54'
N8	8	Ardie Savea (c)		(substituted off) 37'
OF	7	Dalton Papalii		(substituted off) 62'
BF	6	Akira Ioane
RL	5	Scott Barrett
LL	4	Brodie Retallick
TP	3	Nepo Laulala		(substituted off) 56'
HK	2	Codie Taylor		(substituted off) 36'
LP	1	George Bower		(substituted off) 56'
Replacements:
HK	16	Samisoni Taukei'aho		(substituted on) 36'
PR	17	Karl Tu'inukuafe		(substituted on) 56'
PR	18	Angus Ta'avao		(substituted on) 56'
LK	19	Tupou Vaa'i		(substituted on) 62'
FL	20	Ethan Blackadder		(substituted on) 37'
SH	21	TJ Perenara		(substituted on) 54'
FB	22	Damian McKenzie		(substituted on) 47'
WG	23	George Bridge		(substituted on) 69'
Coach:
Ian Foster

Assistant referees:
Jordan Way (Australia)
Graham Cooper (Australia)
Television match official:
Brett Cronan (Australia)

Notes:

- Jordie Barrett (New Zealand) became the first player at international level to receive a 20-minute red card.
- This was New Zealand's first ever match victory and their first ever win over Australia in Perth.
- This was Australia's first defeat in Perth since 2009 when they lost to South Africa 25–32 in the 2009 Tri Nations Series at Subiaco Oval.

=== Round 3 ===
12 September 2021
17:05 AEST (UTC+10)

(1 BP) New Zealand	39–0	Argentina
Try: R. Ioane 9' c Reece 36' m Papalii 40+2' c Jacobson (2) 45' c, 69' c Con: B. Barrett (1/2) 10'; J. Barrett (3/3) 40+4', 47', 69'; Pen: B. Barrett (1/1) 33'; J. Barrett (1/1) 77'	Report

Robina Stadium, Gold Coast (Australia)
Attendance: 15,191
Referee: Nic Berry (Australia)

New Zealand

Argentina

FB	15	Jordie Barrett
RW	14	Sevu Reece
OC	13	Rieko Ioane
IC	12	David Havili	(substituted off) 49'
LW	11	George Bridge
FH	10	Beauden Barrett	(substituted off) 49'
SH	9	TJ Perenara	(substituted off) 60'
N8	8	Luke Jacobson
OF	7	Dalton Papalii
BF	6	Akira Ioane	(substituted off) 64'
RL	5	Scott Barrett	(substituted off) 57'
LL	4	Brodie Retallick (c)
TP	3	Nepo Laulala	(substituted off) 49'
HK	2	Asafo Aumua	(substituted off) 43'
LP	1	Karl Tu'inukuafe	(substituted off) 2'	(substituted on) 11'	(substituted off) 49'
Replacements:
HK	16	Samisoni Taukei'aho	(substituted on) 43'
PR	17	Joe Moody	(substituted on) 2'	(substituted off) 11'	(substituted on) 49'
PR	18	Tyrel Lomax	(substituted on) 49'
LK	19	Tupou Vaa'i	(substituted on) 57'
FL	20	Ethan Blackadder	(substituted on) 64'
SH	21	Brad Weber	(substituted on) 60'
FB	22	Damian McKenzie	(substituted on) 49'
CE	23	Quinn Tupaea	(substituted on) 49'
Coach:
Ian Foster

FB	15	Juan Cruz Mallía
RW	14	Bautista Delguy
OC	13	Matías Moroni		(substituted off) 50'
IC	12	Jerónimo de la Fuente		(substituted off) 62'
LW	11	Santiago Cordero
FH	10	Nicolás Sánchez		35' to 38'		(substituted off) 52'
SH	9	Gonzalo Bertranou
N8	8	Rodrigo Bruni		(substituted off) 52'
OF	7	Marcos Kremer
BF	6	Pablo Matera	(yellow card) 40' to 50'
RL	5	Matías Alemanno
LL	4	Guido Petti		(substituted off) 49'
TP	3	Santiago Medrano		(substituted off) 57'
HK	2	Julián Montoya (c)		(substituted off) 60'
LP	1	Facundo Gigena		(substituted off) 57'	(substituted on) 66'	(substituted off) 77'
Replacements:
HK	16	Facundo Bosch		(substituted on) 60'
PR	17	Carlos Muzzio	(yellow card) 66' to 76'	(substituted on) 57'
PR	18	Enrique Pieretto		(substituted on) 57'
LK	19	Tomás Lavanini		(substituted on) 49'
FL	20	Juan Martín González		(substituted on) 52'	(substituted off) 66'	(substituted on) 77'
SH	21	Gonzalo García		(substituted on) 62'
CE	22	Santiago Chocobares		(substituted on) 50'
FB	23	Emiliano Boffelli		(substituted on) 35'	(substituted off) 38'	(substituted on) 52'
Coach:
Mario Ledesma

Assistant referees:
Jaco Peyper (South Africa)
Graham Cooper (Australia)
Television match official:
Brett Cronan (Australia)

Notes:

- Anton Lienert-Brown (New Zealand) was named to start but withdrew ahead of kick off and was replaced by Rieko Ioane, Quinn Tupaea replaced Ioane on the bench.
- Gonzalo García (Argentina) made his international debut.
- Nicolás Sánchez became Argentina's most capped player with 90 Test caps, surpassing Agustín Creevy's record of 89 Test caps.
- This was New Zealand's first win in Queensland since 2014 when they beat Australia 29–28 in the 2014 third Bledisloe Cup Test at Brisbane's Lang Park.

12 September 2021
20:05 AEST (UTC+10)

(1 BP) South Africa	26–28	Australia
Try: Mbonambi 27' m Marx (2) 58' c, 71' m Con: Pollard (1/2) 59'; Pen: Pollard (3/5) 5', 11', 45'	Report	Try: Kellaway 16' c Con: Cooper (1/1) 17'; Pen: Cooper (7/7) 7', 13', 32', 40', 52', 62', 80+1'

Robina Stadium, Gold Coast (Note: Relocated from the Sydney Cricket Ground.)
Attendance: 15,191
Referee: Luke Pearce (England)

South Africa

Australia

FB	15	Willie le Roux	(yellow card) 51' to 61'
RW	14	Sbu Nkosi
OC	13	Lukhanyo Am
IC	12	Damian de Allende
LW	11	Makazole Mapimpi
FH	10	Handré Pollard		(substituted off) 65'
SH	9	Faf de Klerk		(substituted off) 76'
N8	8	Duane Vermeulen		(substituted off) 52'
BF	7	Franco Mostert
OF	6	Siya Kolisi (c)	(yellow card) 15' to 25'	(substituted off) 54'
RL	5	Lood de Jager			(substituted off) 68'
LL	4	Eben Etzebeth		(substituted off) 52'	(substituted on) 68'
TP	3	Frans Malherbe		(substituted off) 52'
HK	2	Bongi Mbonambi		(substituted off) 46'
LP	1	Steven Kitshoff		(substituted off) 56'
Replacements:
HK	16	Malcolm Marx		(substituted on) 56'
PR	17	Ox Nché		(substituted on) 56'
PR	18	Vincent Koch		(substituted on) 52'
FL	19	Marco van Staden		(substituted on) 54'
FL	20	Kwagga Smith		(substituted on) 52'
N8	21	Jasper Wiese		(substituted on) 52'
SH	22	Herschel Jantjies		(substituted on) 76'
FH	23	Damian Willemse		(substituted on) 65'
Coach:
Jacques Nienaber

FB	15	Tom Banks		(substituted off) 73'
RW	14	Andrew Kellaway		(substituted off) 62'
OC	13	Len Ikitau
IC	12	Samu Kerevi
LW	11	Marika Koroibete
FH	10	Quade Cooper
SH	9	Tate McDermott		(substituted off) 40'
N8	8	Rob Valetini		(substituted off) 63'	(substituted on) 68'
OF	7	Michael Hooper (c)
BF	6	Lachlan Swinton		(substituted off) 59'
RL	5	Matt Philip	(yellow card) 26' to 36'
LL	4	Izack Rodda		(substituted off) 73'
TP	3	Allan Alaalatoa		(substituted off) 55'
HK	2	Folau Fainga'a	(yellow card) 57' to 67'		(substituted off) 68'
LP	1	Angus Bell		(substituted off) 47'
Replacements:
HK	16	Feleti Kaitu'u		(substituted on) 63'
PR	17	James Slipper		(substituted on) 47'
PR	18	Taniela Tupou		(substituted on) 55'
LK	19	Rob Leota		(substituted on) 73'
FL	20	Pete Samu		(substituted on) 59'
SH	21	Nic White		(substituted on) 40'
CE	22	Reece Hodge		(substituted on) 73'
CE	23	Jordan Petaia		(substituted on) 62'
Coach:
Dave Rennie

Player of the Match
Samu Kerevi (Australia)

Assistant referees:
Damon Murphy (Australia)
Jordan Way (Australia)
Television match official:
Matthew Carley (England)

Notes:

- Allan Alaalatoa and Reece Hodge (both Australia) earned their 50th Test caps.
- Feleti Kaitu'u and Rob Leota (both Australia) made their international debuts.

=== Round 4 ===
18 September 2021
17:05 AEST (UTC+10)

(1 BP) Australia	30–17	South Africa
Try: Ikitau (2) 13' m, 20' c Koroibete (2) 61' c, 67' m Con: Cooper (2/4) 22', 63'; Pen: Cooper (2/2) 28', 50'	Report	Try: Am 41' m Pen: Pollard (4/4) 17', 26', 31', 37'

Lang Park, Brisbane
Attendance: 40,000
Referee: Matthew Carley (England)

FB	15	Tom Banks		(substituted off) 27'
RW	14	Andrew Kellaway
OC	13	Len Ikitau
IC	12	Samu Kerevi
LW	11	Marika Koroibete		(substituted off) 71'
FH	10	Quade Cooper
SH	9	Nic White		(substituted off) 59'
N8	8	Rob Valetini
OF	7	Michael Hooper (c)
BF	6	Lachlan Swinton	(yellow card) 32' to 42'	(substituted off) 48'
RL	5	Matt Philip
LL	4	Izack Rodda		(substituted off) 63'
TP	3	Taniela Tupou		(substituted off) 77'
HK	2	Folau Fainga'a		(substituted off) 54'
LP	1	James Slipper		(substituted off) 54'
Replacements:
HK	16	Feleti Kaitu'u		(substituted on) 54'
PR	17	Angus Bell		(substituted on) 54'
PR	18	Tom Robertson		(substituted on) 77'
LK	19	Darcy Swain		(substituted on) 63'
FL	20	Pete Samu		(substituted on) 48'
SH	21	Tate McDermott		(substituted on) 59'
CE	22	Reece Hodge		(substituted on) 27'
CE	23	Jordan Petaia		(substituted on) 71'
Coach:
Dave Rennie

FB	15	Willie le Roux		(substituted off) 78'
RW	14	Sbu Nkosi
OC	13	Lukhanyo Am
IC	12	Damian de Allende
LW	11	Makazole Mapimpi
FH	10	Handré Pollard
SH	9	Faf de Klerk	(yellow card) 12' to 22'	(substituted off) 63'
N8	8	Duane Vermeulen		(substituted off) 32'	(substituted on) 40'	(substituted off) 68'
BF	7	Franco Mostert
OF	6	Siya Kolisi (c)		(substituted off) 68'
RL	5	Marvin Orie		(substituted off) 46'
LL	4	Eben Etzebeth
TP	3	Frans Malherbe		(substituted off) 46'
HK	2	Bongi Mbonambi		(substituted off) 46'
LP	1	Trevor Nyakane		(substituted off) 24'	(substituted on) 32'	(substituted off) 46'
Replacements:
HK	16	Malcolm Marx		(substituted on) 46'
PR	17	Steven Kitshoff		(substituted on) 24'	(substituted off) 32'	(substituted on) 46'
PR	18	Vincent Koch		(substituted on) 46'
FL	19	Marco van Staden		(substituted on) 68'
FL	20	Kwagga Smith		(substituted on) 46'
N8	21	Jasper Wiese	(yellow card) 78'	(substituted on) 32'	(substituted off) 40'	(substituted on) 68'
SH	22	Herschel Jantjies		(substituted on) 63'
FH	23	Damian Willemse		(substituted on) 78'
Coach:
Jacques Nienaber

Player of the Match
Samu Kerevi (Australia)

Assistant referees:
Luke Pearce (England)
Graham Cooper (Australia)
Television match official:
Brett Cronan (Australia)

Notes:

- Michael Hooper captained the Wallabies for a record 60th time, surpassing the previous record of 59 set by George Gregan.
- Australia won back-to-back Test matches against South Africa for the first time since their 2015–16 victories.
- Australia reclaim the Mandela Challenge Plate.

18 September 2021
20:05 AEST (UTC+10)

Argentina	13–36	New Zealand (1 BP)
Try: Boffelli 52' c Con: Boffelli (1/1) 53'; Pen: Boffelli (2/2) 8', 44'	Report	Try: Tuipulotu 5' c Perenara 26' c Vaa'i (2) 40' c, 78' c Taukei'aho 46' m Con: J. Barrett (4/5) 6', 28', 40', 78'; Pen: J. Barrett (1/1) 13'

Lang Park, Brisbane (Australia)
Attendance: 38,215
Referee: Jaco Peyper (South Africa)

FB	15	Juan Cruz Mallía
RW	14	Santiago Cordero	(substituted off) 66'
OC	13	Lucio Cinti	(substituted off) 75'
IC	12	Santiago Chocobares
LW	11	Emiliano Boffelli
FH	10	Santiago Carreras
SH	9	Gonzalo Bertranou	(substituted off) 56'
N8	8	Pablo Matera	(substituted off) 61'
OF	7	Marcos Kremer
BF	6	Juan Martín González
RL	5	Tomás Lavanini
LL	4	Matías Alemanno	(substituted off) 51'
TP	3	Santiago Medrano	(substituted off) 48'
HK	2	Julián Montoya (c)	(substituted off) 61'
LP	1	Facundo Gigena	(substituted off) 48'
Replacements:
HK	16	Santiago Socino	(substituted on) 61'
PR	17	Carlos Muzzio	(substituted on) 48'
PR	18	Enrique Pieretto	(substituted on) 48'
LK	19	Guido Petti	(substituted on) 51'
FL	20	Tomás Lezana	(substituted on) 61'
SH	21	Gonzalo García	(substituted on) 56'
FH	22	Domingo Miotti	(substituted on) 75'
CE	23	Matías Moroni	(substituted on) 66'
Coach:
Mario Ledesma

FB	15	Jordie Barrett
RW	14	Will Jordan
OC	13	Rieko Ioane	(substituted off) 55'
IC	12	Quinn Tupaea
LW	11	George Bridge
FH	10	Damian McKenzie	(substituted off) 66'
SH	9	TJ Perenara	(substituted off) 48'
N8	8	Hoskins Sotutu	(substituted off) 66'
OF	7	Ardie Savea (c)
BF	6	Ethan Blackadder
RL	5	Tupou Vaa'i
LL	4	Patrick Tuipulotu	(substituted off) 68'
TP	3	Tyrel Lomax	(substituted off) 53'
HK	2	Samisoni Taukei'aho	(substituted off) 48'
LP	1	Joe Moody	(substituted off) 48'
Replacements:
HK	16	Codie Taylor	(substituted on) 48'
PR	17	George Bower	(substituted on) 48'
PR	18	Ofa Tu'ungafasi	(substituted on) 53'
LK	19	Scott Barrett	(substituted on) 68'
N8	20	Luke Jacobson	(substituted on) 66'
SH	21	Finlay Christie	(substituted on) 48'
FH	22	Beauden Barrett	(substituted on) 66'
CE	23	Braydon Ennor	(substituted on) 55'
Coach:
Ian Foster

Assistant referees:
Nic Berry (Australia)
Jordan Way (Australia)
Television match official:
Damon Murphy (Australia)

Notes:

- This was New Zealand's first win at Lang Park since 2014, when they beat Australia 29–28 in the third Bledisloe Cup Test match.
- New Zealand reclaimed the No. 1 World Rugby Ranking.

=== Round 5 ===
25 September 2021
17:05 AEST (UTC+10)

New Zealand	19–17	South Africa (1 BP)
Try: Jordan 3' c Con: J. Barrett (1/1) 4'; Pen: J. Barrett (4/4) 31', 36', 61', 78'	Report	Try: Nkosi 6' m Pen: Pollard (4/4) 11', 14', 58', 67'

North Queensland Stadium, Townsville (Australia) (Note: Relocated from Forsyth Barr Stadium.)
Attendance: 25,000
Referee: Luke Pearce (England)

FB	15	Jordie Barrett
RW	14	Will Jordan	(substituted off) 57'
OC	13	Rieko Ioane
IC	12	David Havili
LW	11	George Bridge	(substituted off) 70'
FH	10	Beauden Barrett
SH	9	TJ Perenara	(substituted off) 64'
N8	8	Ardie Savea (c)
OF	7	Ethan Blackadder
BF	6	Akira Ioane	(substituted off) 69'
RL	5	Scott Barrett	(substituted off) 67'
LL	4	Brodie Retallick
TP	3	Nepo Laulala	(substituted off) 57'
HK	2	Codie Taylor	(substituted off) 63'
LP	1	Joe Moody	(substituted off) 57'
Replacements:
HK	16	Samisoni Taukei'aho	(substituted on) 63'
PR	17	Karl Tu'inukuafe	(substituted on) 57'
PR	18	Ofa Tu'ungafasi	(substituted on) 57'
LK	19	Patrick Tuipulotu	(substituted on) 67'
FL	20	Hoskins Sotutu	(substituted on) 69'
SH	21	Brad Weber	(substituted on) 64'
FB	22	Damian McKenzie	(substituted on) 57'
CE	23	Quinn Tupaea	(substituted on) 70'
Coach:
Ian Foster

FB	15	Willie le Roux
RW	14	Sbu Nkosi	(yellow card) 34' to 44'
OC	13	Lukhanyo Am
IC	12	Damian de Allende		(substituted off) 68'
LW	11	Makazole Mapimpi
FH	10	Handré Pollard
SH	9	Faf de Klerk		(substituted off) 75'
N8	8	Duane Vermeulen
BF	7	Kwagga Smith		(substituted off) 63'
OF	6	Siya Kolisi (c)
RL	5	Lood de Jager
LL	4	Eben Etzebeth		(substituted off) 54'
TP	3	Frans Malherbe		(substituted off) 63'
HK	2	Bongi Mbonambi		(substituted off) 40'
LP	1	Trevor Nyakane		(substituted off) 40'
Replacements:
HK	16	Malcolm Marx		(substituted on) 40'
PR	17	Steven Kitshoff		(substituted on) 40'
PR	18	Vincent Koch		(substituted on) 63'
LK	19	Franco Mostert		(substituted on) 54'
FL	20	Marco van Staden		(substituted on) 63'
SH	21	Herschel Jantjies		(substituted on) 75'
FH	22	Elton Jantjies
CE	23	Frans Steyn		(substituted on) 68'
Coach:
Jacques Nienaber

Assistant referees:
Jordan Way (Australia)
Reuben Keane (Australia)
Television match official:
Damon Murphy (Australia)

Notes:

- Luke Jacobson was named to start but withdrew ahead of kick-off with Ethan Blackadder replacing him in the starting XV; Hoskins Sotutu replaced Blackadder on the bench.
- Trevor Nyakane (South Africa) earned his 50th Test cap.
- This was the 100th meeting between the two teams.
- New Zealand retain the Freedom Cup.

25 September 2021
20:05 AEST (UTC+10)

Australia	27–8	Argentina
Try: Hodge 5' c Kerevi 19' c Kellaway 69' c Con: Cooper (2/2) 7', 19'; O'Connor (1/1) 71'; Pen: Cooper (1/1) 32'; O'Connor (1/1) 60'	Report	Try: Montoya 43' m Pen: Boffelli (1/3) 21'

North Queensland Stadium, Townsville (Note: Relocated from Newcastle International Sports Centre.)
Attendance: 23,184
Referee: Matthew Carley (England)

Australia

Argentina

FB	15	Reece Hodge	(substituted off) 73'
RW	14	Andrew Kellaway
OC	13	Len Ikitau
IC	12	Samu Kerevi
LW	11	Marika Koroibete
FH	10	Quade Cooper	(substituted off) 57'
SH	9	Nic White	(substituted off) 57'
N8	8	Rob Valetini
BF	7	Michael Hooper (c)
OF	6	Rob Leota	(substituted off) 52'
RL	5	Matt Philip	(substituted off) 61'
LL	4	Izack Rodda
TP	3	Taniela Tupou	(substituted off) 67'
HK	2	Folau Fainga'a	(substituted off) 71'
LP	1	James Slipper	(substituted off) 52'
Replacements:
HK	16	Feleti Kaitu'u	(substituted on) 71'
PR	17	Angus Bell	(substituted on) 52'
PR	18	Tom Robertson	(substituted on) 67'
LK	19	Darcy Swain	(substituted on) 61'
FL	20	Pete Samu	(substituted on) 52'
SH	21	Tate McDermott	(substituted on) 57'
FH	22	James O'Connor	(substituted on) 57'
CE	23	Jordan Petaia	(substituted on) 73'
Coach:
Dave Rennie

FB	15	Juan Cruz Mallía		(substituted off) 73'
RW	14	Santiago Cordero		(substituted off) 52'
OC	13	Lucio Cinti
IC	12	Santiago Chocobares
LW	11	Emiliano Boffelli
FH	10	Santiago Carreras
SH	9	Gonzalo Bertranou
N8	8	Pablo Matera
OF	7	Marcos Kremer	(yellow card) 56' to 66'	(substituted off) 67'
BF	6	Juan Martín González
RL	5	Tomás Lavanini
LL	4	Matías Alemanno		(substituted off) 47'
TP	3	Santiago Medrano		(substituted off) 71'
HK	2	Julián Montoya (c)		(substituted off) 73'
LP	1	Facundo Gigena		(substituted off) 39' (substituted on) 40' (substituted off) 61'
Replacements:
HK	16	Santiago Socino		(substituted on) 73'
PR	17	Rodrigo Martínez		(substituted on) 39' (substituted off) 40' (substituted on) 61'
PR	18	Enrique Pieretto		(substituted on) 71'
LK	19	Guido Petti		(substituted on) 47'
N8	20	Joaquín Oviedo		(substituted on) 67'
SH	21	Gonzalo García
FH	22	Domingo Miotti		(substituted on) 73'
WG	23	Mateo Carreras		(substituted on) 52'
Coach:
Mario Ledesma

Player of the Match:
Samu Kerevi (Australia)

Assistant referees:
Jaco Peyper (South Africa)
Nic Berry (Australia)
Television match official:
Brett Cronan (Australia)

Notes:

- Mateo Carreras, Rodrigo Martínez and Joaquín Oviedo (all Argentina) made their international debuts.
- Australia retain the Puma Trophy.

=== Round 6 ===
2 October 2021
17:05 AEST (UTC+10)

Argentina	17–32	Australia (1 BP)
Try: Gallo (2) 62' c, 71' c Con: Boffelli (2/2) 62', 71'; Pen: Boffelli (1/1) 40+2'	Report	Try: Fainga'a 26' m Kellaway (3) 33' c, 53' c, 57' m Kerevi 42' m Con: Cooper (2/5) 34', 55'; Pen: Cooper (1/1) 10'

Robina Stadium, Gold Coast (Note: Relocated from Canberra Stadium.)
Attendance: 20,441
Referee: Jaco Peyper (South Africa)

FB	15	Juan Cruz Mallía
RW	14	Matías Moroni
OC	13	Lucio Cinti		(substituted off) 63'
IC	12	Santiago Chocobares
LW	11	Emiliano Boffelli
FH	10	Santiago Carreras
SH	9	Gonzalo Bertranou		(substituted off) 60'
N8	8	Rodrigo Bruni		(substituted off) 59'
OF	7	Marcos Kremer		(substituted off) 61'		(substituted on) 75'
BF	6	Juan Martín González			(substituted off) 75'
RL	5	Tomás Lavanini	(yellow card) 26' to 36'
LL	4	Guido Petti
TP	3	Enrique Pieretto		(substituted off) 51'
HK	2	Julián Montoya (c)
LP	1	Rodrigo Martínez		(substituted off) 51'
Replacements:
HK	16	Facundo Bosch
PR	17	Thomas Gallo		(substituted on) 51'
PR	18	Eduardo Bello		(substituted on) 51'
LK	19	Matías Alemanno		(substituted on) 61'
FL	20	Francisco Gorrissen		(substituted on) 59'
SH	21	Gonzalo García		(substituted on) 60'
FH	22	Domingo Miotti
WG	23	Mateo Carreras		(substituted on) 63'
Coach:
Mario Ledesma

FB	15	Reece Hodge
RW	14	Jordan Petaia		(substituted off) 67'
OC	13	Len Ikitau
IC	12	Samu Kerevi		(substituted off) 51'
LW	11	Andrew Kellaway
FH	10	Quade Cooper		(substituted off) 59'
SH	9	Nic White		(substituted off) 59'
N8	8	Rob Valetini
BF	7	Michael Hooper (c)	(yellow card) 80+1'
OF	6	Pete Samu		(substituted off) 55'
RL	5	Darcy Swain			(substituted off) 77'
LL	4	Izack Rodda		(substituted off) 49'	(substituted on) 77'
TP	3	Taniela Tupou		(substituted off) 62'
HK	2	Folau Fainga'a
LP	1	James Slipper		(substituted off) 49'
Replacements:
HK	16	Lachlan Lonergan		(substituted on) 67'
PR	17	Angus Bell		(substituted on) 49'
PR	18	Greg Holmes		(substituted on) 62'
LK	19	Matt Philip		(substituted on) 49'
FL	20	Sean McMahon		(substituted on) 55'
SH	21	Jake Gordon		(substituted on) 59'
FH	22	James O'Connor		(substituted on) 59'
WG	23	Tom Wright		(substituted on) 51'
Coach:
Dave Rennie

Assistant referees:
Nic Berry (Australia)
Jordan Way (Australia)
Television match official:
James Leckie (Australia)

Notes:

- Eduardo Bello and Thomas Gallo (Argentina) both made their international debuts.
- Greg Holmes becomes the oldest player to represent the Wallabies at the age of 38 years and 113 days surpassing Tony Miller's record by one day.
- Australia win four matches in the Rugby Championship for the first time, while also winning four consecutive Test matches (in any competition) for the first time since 2017.

2 October 2021
20:05 AEST (UTC+10)

South Africa	31–29	New Zealand (1 BP)
Try: De Allende 5' m Mapimpi 51' m Pen: Pollard (4/5) 11', 23', 40', 44'; E. Jantjies (2/2) 57', 80+2'; Drop: E. Jantjies (1/1) 76'	Report	Try: Reece 12' m Savea 27' c Weber 32' m Con: J. Barrett (1/3) 28'; Pen: J. Barrett (4/4) 8', 66', 75', 78'

Robina Stadium, Gold Coast (Australia) (Note: Relocated from Eden Park.)
Attendance: 20,441
Referee: Matthew Carley (England)

FB	15	Willie le Roux	(substituted off) 40'
RW	14	Sbu Nkosi	(substituted off) 47'
OC	13	Lukhanyo Am
IC	12	Damian de Allende
LW	11	Makazole Mapimpi
FH	10	Handré Pollard
SH	9	Faf de Klerk	(substituted off) 65'
N8	8	Duane Vermeulen
BF	7	Kwagga Smith
OF	6	Siya Kolisi (c)	(substituted off) 55'
RL	5	Lood de Jager	(substituted off) 50'	(substituted on) 73'
LL	4	Eben Etzebeth		(substituted off) 73'
TP	3	Trevor Nyakane	(substituted off) 38'
HK	2	Bongi Mbonambi	(substituted off) 38'
LP	1	Ox Nché	(substituted off) 38'
Replacements:
HK	16	Malcolm Marx	(substituted on) 38'
PR	17	Steven Kitshoff	(substituted on) 38'
PR	18	Vincent Koch	(substituted on) 38'
LK	19	Franco Mostert	(substituted on) 50'
N8	20	Jasper Wiese	(substituted on) 55'
SH	21	Herschel Jantjies	(substituted on) 65'
FH	22	Elton Jantjies	(substituted on) 47'
CE	23	Frans Steyn	(substituted on) 40'
Coach:
Jacques Nienaber

FB	15	Jordie Barrett
RW	14	Sevu Reece
OC	13	Anton Lienert-Brown
IC	12	David Havili	(substituted off) 65'
LW	11	Rieko Ioane
FH	10	Beauden Barrett	(substituted off) 65'
SH	9	Brad Weber	(substituted off) 57'
N8	8	Luke Jacobson	(substituted off) 49'
OF	7	Ardie Savea (c)
BF	6	Akira Ioane
RL	5	Scott Barrett	(substituted off) 40'
LL	4	Brodie Retallick
TP	3	Nepo Laulala	(substituted off) 57'
HK	2	Codie Taylor	(substituted off) 57'
LP	1	Joe Moody	(substituted off) 57'
Replacements:
HK	16	Asafo Aumua	(substituted on) 57'
PR	17	George Bower	(substituted on) 57'
PR	18	Ofa Tu'ungafasi	(substituted on) 57'
LK	19	Patrick Tuipulotu	(substituted on) 40'
FL	20	Ethan Blackadder	(substituted on) 49'
SH	21	TJ Perenara	(substituted on) 57'
FH	22	Richie Mo'unga	(substituted on) 65'
FB	23	Damian McKenzie	(substituted on) 65'
Coach:
Ian Foster

Assistant referees:
Damon Murphy (Australia)
Jordan Way (Australia)
Television match official:
Brett Cronan (Australia)

Notes:

- This was South Africa's first Test victory in Australia and in Queensland since 2013.
- South Africa reclaimed No. 1 in the World Rugby Rankings.

== Statistics ==
=== Points scorers ===
Pos.	Player	Team	Pts.
1	Handré Pollard	South Africa	66
2	Jordie Barrett	New Zealand	53
3	Quade Cooper	Australia	47
4	Andrew Kellaway	Australia	35
5	Elton Jantjies	South Africa	26
6	Emiliano Boffelli	Argentina	23
7	Beauden Barrett	New Zealand	17
8	David Havili	New Zealand	15
8	Will Jordan	New Zealand	15
8	Sevu Reece	New Zealand	15
8	Malcolm Marx	South Africa	15

=== Try scorers ===
Pos.	Player	Team	Tries
1	Andrew Kellaway	Australia	7
2	David Havili	New Zealand	3
2	Will Jordan	New Zealand	3
2	Sevu Reece	New Zealand	3
2	Malcolm Marx	South Africa	3
6	Folau Fainga'a	Australia	2
6	Thomas Gallo	Argentina	2
6	Len Ikitau	Australia	2
6	Rieko Ioane	New Zealand	2
6	Luke Jacobson	New Zealand	2
6	Samu Kerevi	Australia	2
6	Marika Koroibete	Australia	2
6	Makazole Mapimpi	South Africa	2
6	Ardie Savea	New Zealand	2
6	Codie Taylor	New Zealand	2

== Participants ==
Team	Head coach	Captain	World Rugby Rankings	
Team	Head coach	Captain	Start (Note: As of 9 August 2021.)	End (Note: As of 4 October 2021.)
Argentina	Mario Ledesma	Julián Montoya	7th	8th
Australia	Dave Rennie	Michael Hooper	6th	3rd
New Zealand	Ian Foster	Sam Whitelock	2nd	2nd
South Africa	Jacques Nienaber	Siya Kolisi	1st	1st

=== Squads ===
Note: Ages, caps and clubs/franchises are of 14 August 2021.

==== Argentina ====
On 29 July, Argentina announced a 47-man roster for the 2021 Rugby Championship.

On 30 September, Pablo Matera, Sebastián Cancelliere, Joaquín Díaz Bonilla, Felipe Ezcurra, Santiago Medrano and Santiago Socino were expelled from the tournament for breaching COVID-19 protocols.

Note: Flags indicate national union for the club/province as defined by World Rugby.

Player	Position	Date of birth (age)	Caps	Club/province
Facundo Bosch	Hooker	8 August 1991 (aged 30)	5	(France) La Rochelle
Julián Montoya (c)	Hooker	29 October 1993 (aged 27)	66	(England) Leicester Tigers
Ignacio Ruiz	Hooker	3 January 2001 (aged 20)	0	(Argentina) Jaguares XV
Santiago Socino	Hooker	7 May 1992 (aged 29)	4	(England) Gloucester
Thomas Gallo	Prop	30 April 1999 (aged 22)	0	(Italy) Benetton
Facundo Gigena	Prop	15 September 1994 (aged 26)	3	(England) London Irish
Francisco Gómez Kodela	Prop	7 July 1985 (aged 36)	14	(France) Lyon
Rodrigo Martínez	Prop	7 July 1997 (aged 24)	0	(Paraguay) Olímpia Lions
Santiago Medrano	Prop	6 May 1996 (aged 25)	24	(Australia) Force
Carlos Muzzio	Prop	21 August 1984 (aged 36)	0	(France) Mont-de-Marsan
Enrique Pieretto	Prop	15 December 1994 (aged 26)	25	(Scotland) Glasgow Warriors
Nahuel Tetaz Chaparro	Prop	11 June 1989 (aged 32)	65	(England) Bristol Bears
Joel Sclavi	Prop	25 June 1994 (aged 27)	0	(Argentina) Jaguares XV
Juan Pablo Zeiss	Prop	2 August 1989 (aged 32)	7	(Argentina) Jaguares XV
Matías Alemanno	Lock	5 December 1991 (aged 29)	68	(England) Gloucester
Rodrigo Fernández Criado	Lock	18 March 1998 (aged 23)	0	(Argentina) Jaguares XV
Marcos Kremer	Lock	30 July 1997 (aged 24)	35	(France) Stade Français
Tomás Lavanini	Lock	22 January 1993 (aged 28)	60	(England) Leicester Tigers
Guido Petti	Lock	17 November 1994 (aged 26)	58	(France) Bordeaux Bègles
Rodrigo Bruni	Back row	3 September 1993 (aged 27)	10	(France) Vannes
Juan Martín González	Back row	14 November 2000 (aged 20)	1	(Argentina) Jaguares XV
Francisco Gorrissen	Back row	30 August 1994 (aged 26)	2	(Argentina) Jaguares XV
Facundo Isa	Back row	21 September 1993 (aged 27)	33	(France) Toulon
Tomás Lezana	Back row	16 February 1994 (aged 27)	36	(Australia) Force
Pablo Matera	Back row	18 July 1993 (aged 28)	72	(New Zealand) Crusaders
Joaquín Oviedo	Back row	17 July 2001 (aged 20)	0	(Argentina) Jaguares XV
Gonzalo Bertranou	Scrum-half	31 December 1993 (aged 27)	28	(Wales) Dragons
Tomás Cubelli	Scrum-half	12 June 1989 (aged 32)	77	(Australia) Force
Felipe Ezcurra	Scrum-half	15 May 1993 (aged 28)	11	(Argentina) Jaguares XV
Joaquín Díaz Bonilla	Fly-half	12 April 1989 (aged 32)	4	(England) Leicester Tigers
Santiago Mare	Fly-half	21 October 1996 (aged 24)	0	Argentina Sevens
Domingo Miotti	Fly-half	22 May 1996 (aged 25)	4	(Australia) Force
Nicolás Sánchez	Fly-half	26 October 1988 (aged 32)	87	(France) Stade Français
Santiago Chocobares	Centre	31 March 1999 (aged 22)	4	(France) Toulouse
Lucio Cinti	Centre	23 February 2000 (aged 21)	0	Argentina Sevens
Jerónimo de la Fuente	Centre	24 February 1991 (aged 30)	59	(France) Perpignan
Juan Cruz Mallía	Centre	11 September 1996 (aged 24)	8	(France) Toulouse
Matías Moroni	Centre	29 March 1991 (aged 30)	50	(England) Leicester Tigers
Matías Orlando	Centre	14 November 1991 (aged 29)	43	(England) Newcastle Falcons
Sebastián Cancelliere	Wing	17 September 1993 (aged 27)	10	(Argentina) Jaguares XV
Mateo Carreras	Wing	17 December 1999 (aged 21)	0	(England) Newcastle Falcons
Santiago Cordero	Wing	6 December 1993 (aged 27)	40	(France) Bordeaux Bègles
Bautista Delguy	Wing	22 April 1997 (aged 24)	19	(France) Bordeaux Bègles
Marcos Moneta	Wing	7 March 2000 (aged 21)	0	Argentina Sevens
Emiliano Boffelli	Fullback	16 January 1995 (aged 26)	31	(France) Racing 92
Santiago Carreras	Fullback	30 March 1998 (aged 23)	11	(England) Gloucester
Ignacio Mendy	Fullback	29 June 2000 (aged 21)	0	Argentina Sevens

==== Australia ====
On 25 July, Australia named a 42-man Wallabies squad for the 2021 Rugby Championship.

On 26 July, Quade Cooper was a late addition to the squad.

On 10 August, Samu Kerevi was added to the squad to be available for selection ahead of Australia's second round match (Bledisloe 3) against New Zealand in Perth.

Player	Position	Date of birth (age)	Caps	Club/province
Feleti Kaitu'u	Hooker	30 December 1994 (aged 26)	0	(Australia) Force
Lachlan Lonergan	Hooker	11 October 1999 (aged 21)	2	(Australia) Brumbies
Brandon Paenga-Amosa	Hooker	25 December 1995 (aged 25)	13	(Australia) Reds
Jordan Uelese	Hooker	24 January 1997 (aged 24)	14	(Australia) Rebels
Allan Alaalatoa	Prop	28 January 1994 (aged 27)	47	(Australia) Brumbies
Angus Bell	Prop	10 April 2000 (aged 21)	7	(Australia) Waratahs
Pone Fa'amausili	Prop	26 February 1997 (aged 24)	0	(Australia) Rebels
Tom Robertson	Prop	28 August 1994 (aged 26)	24	(Australia) Force
Scott Sio	Prop	16 October 1991 (aged 29)	68	(Australia) Brumbies
James Slipper	Prop	6 June 1989 (aged 32)	104	(Australia) Brumbies
Taniela Tupou	Prop	10 May 1996 (aged 25)	29	(Australia) Reds
Nick Frost	Lock	10 October 1999 (aged 21)	0	(Australia) Brumbies
Matt Philip	Lock	7 March 1994 (aged 27)	13	(Australia) Rebels
Izack Rodda	Lock	20 August 1996 (aged 24)	25	(Australia) Force
Lukhan Salakaia-Loto	Lock	19 September 1996 (aged 24)	29	(Australia) Reds
Darcy Swain	Lock	5 July 1997 (aged 24)	4	(Australia) Brumbies
Michael Hooper	Back row	29 October 1991 (aged 29)	109	(Japan) Toyota Verblitz
Rob Leota	Back row	3 March 1997 (aged 24)	0	(Australia) Rebels
Fraser McReight	Back row	19 February 1999 (aged 22)	2	(Australia) Reds
Isi Naisarani	Back row	14 February 1995 (aged 26)	11	(Australia) Rebels
Pete Samu	Back row	17 December 1991 (aged 29)	10	(Australia) Brumbies
Lachlan Swinton	Back row	16 January 1997 (aged 24)	2	(Australia) Waratahs
Rob Valetini	Back row	3 September 1998 (aged 22)	8	(Australia) Brumbies
Harry Wilson	Back row	22 November 1999 (aged 21)	9	(Australia) Reds
Jake Gordon	Scrum-half	7 June 1993 (aged 28)	9	(Australia) Waratahs
Ryan Lonergan	Scrum-half	6 April 1998 (aged 23)	0	(Australia) Brumbies
Tate McDermott	Scrum-half	18 September 1998 (aged 22)	6	(Australia) Reds
Nic White	Scrum-half	13 June 1990 (aged 31)	37	(Australia) Brumbies
Quade Cooper	Fly-half	5 April 1988 (aged 33)	70	(Japan) Kintetsu Liners
Noah Lolesio	Fly-half	18 December 1999 (aged 21)	6	(Australia) Brumbies
James O'Connor	Fly-half	5 July 1990 (aged 31)	55	(Australia) Reds
Matt To'omua	Fly-half	2 January 1990 (aged 31)	58	(Australia) Rebels
Lalakai Foketi	Centre	22 December 1994 (aged 26)	0	(Australia) Waratahs
Reece Hodge	Centre	26 August 1994 (aged 26)	47	(Australia) Rebels
Len Ikitau	Centre	1 October 1998 (aged 22)	3	(Australia) Brumbies
Samu Kerevi	Centre	27 September 1993 (aged 27)	13	(Japan) Tokyo Sungoliath
Duncan Paia'aua	Centre	20 January 1995 (aged 26)	0	(France) Toulon
Hunter Paisami	Centre	10 April 1998 (aged 23)	10	(Australia) Reds
Jordan Petaia	Centre	14 March 2000 (aged 21)	9	(Australia) Reds
Andrew Kellaway	Wing	12 October 1995 (aged 25)	3	(Australia) Rebels
Marika Koroibete	Wing	26 July 1992 (aged 29)	37	(Australia) Rebels
Andy Muirhead	Wing	8 March 1993 (aged 28)	0	(Australia) Brumbies
Tom Wright	Wing	21 July 1997 (aged 24)	5	(Australia) Brumbies
Tom Banks	Fullback	18 June 1994 (aged 27)	15	(Australia) Brumbies

==== New Zealand ====
The All Blacks 36-man squad for the 2021 Rugby Championship was named on 19 July.

Player	Position	Date of birth (age)	Caps	Franchise/province
Asafo Aumua	Hooker	5 March 1997 (aged 24)	2	Hurricanes / Wellington
Dane Coles	Hooker	10 December 1986 (aged 34)	76	Hurricanes / Wellington
Samisoni Taukei'aho	Hooker	8 August 1997 (aged 24)	2	Chiefs / Waikato
Codie Taylor	Hooker	31 March 1991 (aged 30)	59	Crusaders / Canterbury
George Bower	Prop	28 May 1992 (aged 29)	3	Crusaders / Otago
Nepo Laulala	Prop	6 November 1991 (aged 29)	32	Blues / Counties Manukau
Tyrel Lomax	Prop	16 March 1996 (aged 25)	8	Hurricanes / Tasman
Joe Moody	Prop	18 September 1988 (aged 32)	50	Crusaders / Canterbury
Angus Ta'avao	Prop	22 March 1990 (aged 31)	17	Chiefs / Auckland
Karl Tu'inukuafe	Prop	21 February 1993 (aged 28)	19	Blues / North Harbour
Ofa Tu'ungafasi	Prop	19 April 1992 (aged 29)	39	Blues / Auckland
Scott Barrett	Lock	20 November 1993 (aged 27)	42	Crusaders / Taranaki
Brodie Retallick	Lock	31 May 1991 (aged 30)	84	Chiefs / Hawke's Bay
Patrick Tuipulotu	Lock	23 January 1993 (aged 28)	39	Blues / Auckland
Tupou Vaa'i	Lock	27 January 2000 (aged 21)	4	Chiefs / Taranaki
Sam Whitelock (c)	Lock	12 October 1988 (aged 32)	126	Crusaders / Canterbury
Ethan Blackadder	Loose forward	22 March 1995 (aged 26)	2	Crusaders / Tasman
Shannon Frizell	Loose forward	11 February 1994 (aged 27)	14	Highlanders / Tasman
Akira Ioane	Loose forward	16 June 1995 (aged 26)	5	Blues / Auckland
Luke Jacobson	Loose forward	20 April 1997 (aged 24)	6	Chiefs / Waikato
Dalton Papalii	Loose forward	11 October 1997 (aged 23)	6	Blues / Counties Manukau
Ardie Savea	Loose forward	14 October 1993 (aged 27)	51	Hurricanes / Wellington
Hoskins Sotutu	Loose forward	12 July 1998 (aged 23)	6	Blues / Counties Manukau
TJ Perenara	Half-back	23 January 1992 (aged 29)	69	Hurricanes / Wellington
Aaron Smith	Half-back	21 November 1988 (aged 32)	100	Highlanders / Manawatu
Brad Weber	Half-back	17 January 1991 (aged 30)	10	Chiefs / Hawke's Bay
Beauden Barrett	First five-eighth	27 May 1991 (aged 30)	92	Blues / Taranaki
Richie Mo'unga	First five-eighth	25 May 1994 (aged 27)	25	Crusaders / Canterbury
Braydon Ennor	Centre	16 July 1997 (aged 24)	1	Crusaders / Canterbury
David Havili	Centre	23 December 1994 (aged 26)	6	Crusaders / Tasman
Rieko Ioane	Centre	18 March 1997 (aged 24)	38	Blues / Auckland
Anton Lienert-Brown	Centre	15 April 1995 (aged 26)	51	Chiefs / Waikato
Quinn Tupaea	Centre	10 May 1999 (aged 22)	1	Chiefs / Waikato
George Bridge	Wing	1 April 1995 (aged 26)	12	Crusaders / Canterbury
Will Jordan	Wing	24 February 1998 (aged 23)	5	Crusaders / Tasman
Sevu Reece	Wing	13 February 1997 (aged 24)	11	Crusaders / Tasman
Jordie Barrett	Fullback	17 February 1997 (aged 24)	26	Hurricanes / Taranaki
Damian McKenzie	Fullback	20 May 1995 (aged 26)	31	Chiefs / Waikato

==== South Africa ====
On 8 August 2021, a 42-man squad for the 2021 Rugby Championship was announced.

On 15 August, Jean-Luc du Preez was recalled to the squad

Player	Position	Date of birth (age)	Caps	Club/province
Joseph Dweba	Hooker	25 October 1995 (aged 25)	0	(France) Bordeaux
Johan Grobbelaar	Hooker	30 December 1997 (aged 23)	0	(South Africa) Bulls
Malcolm Marx	Hooker	13 July 1994 (aged 27)	37	(Japan) Kubota Spears
Bongi Mbonambi	Hooker	7 January 1991 (aged 30)	40	(South Africa) Stormers
Thomas du Toit	Prop	5 May 1995 (aged 26)	12	(South Africa) Sharks
Steven Kitshoff	Prop	10 February 1992 (aged 29)	51	(South Africa) Stormers
Vincent Koch	Prop	13 March 1990 (aged 31)	23	(England) Saracens
Wilco Louw	Prop	20 July 1994 (aged 27)	13	(England) Harlequins
Frans Malherbe	Prop	14 March 1991 (aged 30)	42	(South Africa) Stormers
Ox Nché	Prop	23 July 1995 (aged 26)	3	(South Africa) Sharks
Trevor Nyakane	Prop	4 May 1989 (aged 32)	46	(South Africa) Bulls
Lood de Jager	Lock	17 December 1992 (aged 28)	48	(England) Sale Sharks
Rynhardt Elstadt	Lock	20 December 1989 (aged 31)	3	(France) Toulouse
Eben Etzebeth	Lock	29 October 1991 (aged 29)	89	(France) Toulon
Nico Janse van Rensburg	Lock	6 May 1994 (aged 27)	0	(France) Montpellier
Franco Mostert	Lock	27 November 1990 (aged 30)	43	(Japan) Mie Honda Heat
Marvin Orie	Lock	15 February 1993 (aged 28)	4	(South Africa) Stormers
RG Snyman	Lock	29 January 1995 (aged 26)	23	(Ireland) Munster
Dan du Preez	Loose forward	5 August 1995 (aged 26)	4	(England) Sale Sharks
Jean-Luc du Preez	Loose forward	5 August 1995 (aged 26)	13	(England) Sale Sharks
Siya Kolisi (c)	Loose forward	16 June 1991 (aged 30)	54	(South Africa) Sharks
Kwagga Smith	Loose forward	11 June 1993 (aged 28)	10	(Japan) Shizuoka Blue Revs
Marco van Staden	Loose forward	25 August 1995 (aged 25)	5	(England) Leicester Tigers
Duane Vermeulen	Loose forward	3 July 1986 (aged 35)	54	(South Africa) Bulls
Jasper Wiese	Loose forward	21 October 1995 (aged 25)	3	(England) Leicester Tigers
Faf de Klerk	Scrum-half	19 October 1991 (aged 29)	32	(England) Sale Sharks
Jaden Hendrikse	Scrum-half	23 March 2000 (aged 21)	0	(South Africa) Sharks
Herschel Jantjies	Scrum-half	22 April 1996 (aged 25)	14	(South Africa) Stormers
Cobus Reinach	Scrum-half	7 February 1990 (aged 31)	16	(France) Montpellier
Elton Jantjies	Fly-half	1 August 1990 (aged 31)	39	(France) Pau
Handré Pollard	Fly-half	11 March 1994 (aged 27)	52	(France) Montpellier
Morné Steyn	Fly-half	11 July 1984 (aged 37)	67	(South Africa) Bulls
Lukhanyo Am	Centre	28 November 1993 (aged 27)	18	(South Africa) Sharks
Damian de Allende	Centre	25 November 1991 (aged 29)	50	(Ireland) Munster
Jesse Kriel	Centre	15 February 1994 (aged 27)	47	(Japan) Yokohama Canon Eagles
François Steyn	Centre	14 May 1987 (aged 34)	68	(South Africa) Cheetahs
Cheslin Kolbe	Wing	28 October 1993 (aged 27)	17	(France) Toulouse
Makazole Mapimpi	Wing	26 July 1990 (aged 31)	17	(South Africa) Sharks
Sbu Nkosi	Wing	21 January 1996 (aged 25)	11	(South Africa) Sharks
Rosko Specman	Wing	28 April 1989 (aged 32)	1	(South Africa) Cheetahs
Aphelele Fassi	Fullback	23 January 1998 (aged 23)	1	(South Africa) Sharks
Willie le Roux	Fullback	18 August 1989 (aged 31)	65	(Japan) Toyota Verblitz
Damian Willemse	Fullback	7 May 1998 (aged 23)	10	(South Africa) Stormers

== See also ==
- History of rugby union matches between Argentina and Australia
- History of rugby union matches between Argentina and New Zealand
- History of rugby union matches between Argentina and South Africa
- History of rugby union matches between Australia and South Africa
- History of rugby union matches between Australia and New Zealand
- History of rugby union matches between New Zealand and South Africa
- 2021 July rugby union tests
