= 2019 Rugby Championship =

Southern hemisphere rugby tournament

- Date: 20 July – 10 August 2019
- Countries: Argentina; Australia; New Zealand; South Africa

Final positions
- Champions: South Africa (4th title)
- Bledisloe Cup: New Zealand
- Freedom Cup: New Zealand
- Mandela Challenge Plate: South Africa
- Puma Trophy: Australia

Tournament statistics
- Matches played: 6
- Tries scored: 30 (5 per match)
- Attendance: 232,769 (38,795 per match)
- Top scorer(s): Handré Pollard (42)
- Most tries: Reece Hodge (3); Herschel Jantjies (3)

The 2019 Rugby Championship (Note: Known as The Castle Rugby Championship in South Africa, The Investec Rugby Championship in New Zealand, The Mitsubishi Estate Rugby Championship in Australia, and The Personal Rugby Championship in Argentina for sponsorship reasons.) was the eighth edition of the annual southern hemisphere Rugby Championship, featuring Argentina, Australia, South Africa and New Zealand. The competition is operated by SANZAAR, a joint venture of the four countries' national unions.

The tournament schedule was similar to that of the 2015 edition, being shortened due to the World Cup.

New Zealand was the three-time back-to-back defending champions entering this years Championship. However, South Africa claimed their fourth title, their first since the inception of the Rugby Championship and their first Southern Hemisphere title since 2009. They became the third team to claim the expanded Southern Hemisphere championship, following New Zealand and Australia.

== Background ==
=== Format ===
Because of the 2019 World Cup, the tournament schedule was reduced, as it was in 2015, to each team playing each other once. Australia and Argentina each played two home matches out of the three matches to be played in total. New Zealand and South Africa had one home fixture. As usual, a win earned a team four league points, a draw two league points, and a loss by eight or more points zero league points. A bonus point was earned in one of two ways: by scoring at least three tries more than the opponent in a match, or by losing within seven points. The competition winner was the side with the most points at the end of the tournament.

=== Other Cups ===
Because the Bledisloe Cup is decided in two home-and-away legs, after the end of the shortened Rugby Championship, New Zealand and Australia played for the Bledisloe Cup decider at Eden Park, Auckland, with Australia leading the series 1–0. New Zealand retained the Cup for the 17th consecutive year with a comprehensive 36–0 win, concluding in a 1–1 series result.

== Table ==
Pos	Team	Pld	W	D	L	PF	PA	PD	TF	TA	TB	LB	Pts
1	South Africa (C)	3	2	1	0	97	46	+51	11	4	2	0	12
2	Australia	3	2	0	1	80	71	+9	9	10	0	0	8
3	New Zealand	3	1	1	1	62	79	−17	7	8	0	0	6
4	Argentina	3	0	0	3	39	82	−43	3	8	0	2	2

Source: SANZAAR
(C) Champion

== Results ==
=== Round 1 ===
20 July 2019
17:05 SAST (UTC+2)

(1 BP) South Africa	35–17	Australia
Try: H. Jantjies (2) 10' c, 61' c De Jager 23' c Nkosi 55' c Reinach 80' c Con: E. Jantjies (5/5) 11', 24', 56', 63', 83'	Report	Try: Haylett-Petty 28' c Foley 70' c Con: Foley (2/2) 30', 71'; Pen: Foley (1/1) 16'

Ellis Park Stadium, Johannesburg
Attendance: 51,206
Referee: Paul Williams (New Zealand)

FB	15	Warrick Gelant
RW	14	S'busiso Nkosi
OC	13	Jesse Kriel
IC	12	André Esterhuizen	(yellow card) 20' to 30'	(substituted off) 51'
LW	11	Makazole Mapimpi
FH	10	Elton Jantjies
SH	9	Herschel Jantjies		(substituted off) 59'
N8	8	Francois Louw
OF	7	Pieter-Steph du Toit
BF	6	Rynhardt Elstadt		(substituted off) 59'
RL	5	Lood de Jager		(substituted off) 67'
LL	4	Eben Etzebeth (c)
TP	3	Trevor Nyakane		(substituted off) 53'
HK	2	Bongi Mbonambi		(substituted off) 53'
LP	1	Tendai Mtawarira		(substituted off) 47'
Replacements:
HK	16	Schalk Brits		(substituted on) 53'
PR	17	Lizo Gqoboka		(substituted on) 47'
PR	18	Vincent Koch		(substituted on) 53'
LK	19	Marvin Orie		(substituted on) 67'
FL	20	Marcell Coetzee		(substituted on) 59'
SH	21	Cobus Reinach		(substituted on) 65'
CE	22	François Steyn		(substituted on) 51'
WG	23	Dillyn Leyds
Coach:
(South Africa) Rassie Erasmus

FB	15	Tom Banks		(substituted off) 57'
RW	14	Dane Haylett-Petty
OC	13	Tevita Kuridrani		(substituted off) 57'
IC	12	Samu Kerevi
LW	11	Reece Hodge
FH	10	Bernard Foley
SH	9	Nic White		(substituted off) 64'
N8	8	Isi Naisarani			(substituted off) 54'	(substituted on) 64'
OF	7	Michael Hooper (c)
BF	6	Lukhan Salakaia-Loto
LL	5	Rory Arnold
RL	4	Izack Rodda		(substituted off) 57'
TP	3	Sekope Kepu		(substituted off) 46'	(substituted on) 54'	(substituted off) 64'
HK	2	Folau Fainga'a		(substituted off) 64'	(substituted on) 67'
LP	1	James Slipper		(substituted off) 48'
Replacements:
HK	16	Jordan Uelese		(substituted on) 64'	(substituted off) 67'
PR	17	Harry Johnson-Holmes		(substituted on) 48'
PR	18	Taniela Tupou	(yellow card) 53' to 63'	(substituted on) 46'
LK	19	Rob Simmons		(substituted on) 57'
FL	20	Jack Dempsey		(substituted on) 64'
SH	21	Will Genia		(substituted on) 64'
CE	22	Matt To'omua		(substituted on) 57'
FB	23	Kurtley Beale		(substituted on) 57'
Coach:
(Australia) Michael Cheika

Man of the Match:
Herschel Jantjies (South Africa)

Touch judges:
Matthew Carley (England)
Karl Dickson (England)
Television match official:
Rowan Kitt (England)

Notes:

- Rynhardt Elstadt, Lizo Gqoboka and Herschel Jantjies (all South Africa) and Harry Johnson-Holmes and Isi Naisarani (both Australia) made their international debuts.
- South Africa reclaim the Mandela Challenge Plate.

20 July 2019
15:05 AST (UTC–03)

(1 BP) Argentina	16–20	New Zealand
Try: Boffelli 56' c Con: Sánchez (1/1) 57'; Pen: Sánchez (2/3) 1', 20'; Boffelli (1/1) 6'	Report	Try: Laumape 17' c Retallick 38' c Con: B. Barrett (2/2) 18', 39'; Pen: B. Barrett (2/2) 22', 36'

José Amalfitani Stadium, Buenos Aires
Attendance: 31,320
Referee: Angus Gardner (Australia)

FB	15	Emiliano Boffelli	(substituted off) 59'
RW	14	Matías Moroni
OC	13	Matías Orlando
IC	12	Jerónimo de la Fuente
LW	11	Ramiro Moyano
FH	10	Nicolás Sánchez	(substituted off) 76'
SH	9	Tomás Cubelli	(substituted off) 71'
N8	8	Javier Ortega Desio
OF	7	Marcos Kremer	(substituted off) 70'
BF	6	Pablo Matera (c)
RL	5	Tomás Lavanini	(substituted off) 63'
LL	4	Guido Petti
TP	3	Juan Figallo	(substituted off) 47'
HK	2	Agustín Creevy	(substituted off) 47'
LP	1	Nahuel Tetaz Chaparro	(substituted off) 56'
Replacements:
HK	16	Julián Montoya	(substituted on) 47'
PR	17	Mayco Vivas	(substituted on) 56'
PR	18	Santiago Medrano	(substituted on) 47'
LK	19	Matías Alemanno	(substituted on) 70'
FL	20	Tomás Lezana	(substituted on) 63'
SH	21	Felipe Ezcurra	(substituted on) 71'
FH	22	Joaquín Díaz Bonilla	(substituted on) 76'
FB	23	Joaquín Tuculet	(substituted on) 59'
Coach:
(Argentina) Mario Ledesma

FB	15	Ben Smith
RW	14	Sevu Reece
OC	13	Anton Lienert-Brown
IC	12	Ngani Laumape
LW	11	Jordie Barrett	(substituted off) 67'
FH	10	Beauden Barrett
SH	9	Aaron Smith	(substituted off) 67'
N8	8	Ardie Savea
OF	7	Sam Cane (c)
BF	6	Vaea Fifita	(substituted off) 56'
RL	5	Patrick Tuipulotu	(substituted off) 56'
LL	4	Brodie Retallick
TP	3	Angus Ta'avao	(substituted off) 59'
HK	2	Dane Coles	(substituted off) 64'
LP	1	Ofa Tu'ungafasi	(substituted off) 59'
Replacements:
HK	16	Liam Coltman	(substituted on) 64'
PR	17	Atunaisa Moli	(substituted on) 59'
PR	18	Nepo Laulala	(substituted on) 59'
LK	19	Jackson Hemopo	(substituted on) 56'
FL	20	Luke Jacobson	(substituted on) 56'
SH	21	Brad Weber	(substituted on) 67'
FH	22	Josh Ioane
WG	23	Braydon Ennor	(substituted on) 67'
Coach:
(New Zealand) Steve Hansen

Man of the Match:
Brodie Retallick (New Zealand)

Touch judges:
Pascal Gaüzère (France)
Alexandre Ruiz (France)
Television match official:
Graham Hughes (England)

Notes:

- Mayco Vivas (Argentina) and Braydon Ennor, Luke Jacobson, Atunaisa Moli and Sevu Reece (all New Zealand) made their international debuts.

=== Round 2 ===
27 July 2019
19:35 NZST (UTC+12)

New Zealand	16–16	South Africa
Try: Goodhue 36' c Con: B. Barrett (1/1) 38'; Pen: B. Barrett (1/3) 48'; Mo'unga (2/2) 66', 74'	Report	Try: Jantjies 79' c Con: Pollard (1/1) 80'; Pen: Pollard (3/4) 2', 9', 60'

Wellington Regional Stadium, Wellington
Attendance: 35,213
Referee: Nic Berry (Australia)

FB	15	Beauden Barrett
RW	14	Ben Smith
OC	13	Jack Goodhue
IC	12	Sonny Bill Williams	(substituted off) 58'
LW	11	Rieko Ioane	(substituted off) 60'
FH	10	Richie Mo'unga
SH	9	TJ Perenara	(substituted off) 58'
N8	8	Kieran Read (c)
OF	7	Matt Todd
BF	6	Shannon Frizell	(substituted off) 76'
RL	5	Sam Whitelock
LL	4	Brodie Retallick	(substituted off) 60'
TP	3	Owen Franks	(substituted off) 44'
HK	2	Codie Taylor	(substituted off) 60'
LP	1	Joe Moody	(substituted off) 44'
Replacements:
HK	16	Dane Coles	(substituted on) 60'
PR	17	Ofa Tu'ungafasi	(substituted on) 44'
PR	18	Angus Ta'avao	(substituted on) 44'
FL	19	Vaea Fifita	(substituted on) 60'
FL	20	Dalton Papalii	(substituted on) 76'
SH	21	Aaron Smith	(substituted on) 58'
CE	22	Anton Lienert-Brown	(substituted on) 58'
WG	23	George Bridge	(substituted on) 60'
Coach:
(New Zealand) Steve Hansen

FB	15	Willie le Roux
RW	14	Cheslin Kolbe
OC	13	Lukhanyo Am	(substituted off) 50'
IC	12	Damian de Allende	(substituted off) 55'
LW	11	Makazole Mapimpi
FH	10	Handré Pollard
SH	9	Faf de Klerk	(substituted off) 44'
N8	8	Duane Vermeulen (c)
OF	7	Pieter-Steph du Toit
BF	6	Kwagga Smith	(substituted off) 67'
RL	5	Franco Mostert
LL	4	Eben Etzebeth	(substituted off) 50'
TP	3	Frans Malherbe	(substituted off) 55'
HK	2	Malcolm Marx	(substituted off) 69'
LP	1	Steven Kitshoff	(substituted off) 58'
Replacements:
HK	16	Bongi Mbonambi	(substituted on) 69'
PR	17	Tendai Mtawarira	(substituted on) 58'
PR	18	Trevor Nyakane	(substituted on) 55'
LK	19	RG Snyman	(substituted on) 50'
FL	20	Francois Louw	(substituted on) 67'
SH	21	Herschel Jantjies	(substituted on) 44'
CE	22	François Steyn	(substituted on) 55'
CE	23	Jesse Kriel	(substituted on) 50'
Coach:
(South Africa) Rassie Erasmus

Man of the Match:
Cheslin Kolbe (South Africa)

Touch judges:
Angus Gardner (Australia)
Shuhei Kubo (Japan)
Television match official:
Rowan Kitt (England)

Notes:

- New Zealand retain the Freedom Cup.
- This was the first draw between these two sides since 1994.
- New Zealand passed 16,000 points in international rugby during this game.

27 July 2019
19:45 AEST (UTC+10)

Australia	16–10	Argentina (1 BP)
Try: Hodge 31' c Con: Lealiifano (1/1) 32'; Pen: Lealiifano (3/3) 10', 42', 50'	Report	Try: Isa 73' c Con: Díaz Bonilla (1/1) 74'; Pen: Sánchez (1/1) 23'

Lang Park, Brisbane
Attendance: 31,599
Referee: Ben O'Keeffe (New Zealand)

FB	15	Kurtley Beale
RW	14	Reece Hodge
OC	13	Tevita Kuridrani	(substituted off) 68'
IC	12	Samu Kerevi
LW	11	Marika Koroibete
FH	10	Christian Lealiifano	(substituted off) 51'
SH	9	Will Genia	(substituted off) 59'
N8	8	Isi Naisarani	(substituted off) 65'	(substituted on) 74'
OF	7	Michael Hooper (c)
BF	6	Lukhan Salakaia-Loto
RL	5	Rory Arnold	(substituted off) 59'
LL	4	Izack Rodda		(substituted off) 74'
TP	3	Sekope Kepu	(substituted off) 40'
HK	2	Folau Fainga'a	(substituted off) 57'
LP	1	Scott Sio	(substituted off) 47'
Replacements:
HK	16	Tolu Latu	(substituted on) 57'
PR	17	James Slipper	(substituted on) 47'
PR	18	Taniela Tupou	(substituted on) 40'
LK	19	Rob Simmons	(substituted on) 59'
LK	20	Luke Jones	(substituted on) 65'
SH	21	Nic White	(substituted on) 59'
CE	22	Matt To'omua	(substituted on) 51'
CE	23	James O'Connor	(substituted on) 68'
Coach:
(Australia) Michael Cheika

FB	15	Joaquín Tuculet
RW	14	Santiago Cordero
OC	13	Matías Moroni	(substituted off) 64'
IC	12	Jerónimo de la Fuente
LW	11	Ramiro Moyano
FH	10	Nicolás Sánchez	(substituted off) 60'
SH	9	Tomás Cubelli	(substituted off) 68'
N8	8	Facundo Isa
OF	7	Tomás Lezana
BF	6	Pablo Matera (c)	(substituted off) 65'
RL	5	Tomás Lavanini	(substituted off) 50'
LL	4	Guido Petti
TP	3	Juan Figallo	(substituted off) 50'
HK	2	Julián Montoya	(substituted off) 69'
LP	1	Nahuel Tetaz Chaparro	(substituted off) 53'
Replacements:
HK	16	Santiago Socino	(substituted on) 69'
PR	17	Mayco Vivas	(substituted on) 53'
PR	18	Ramiro Herrera	(substituted on) 50'
LK	19	Matías Alemanno	(substituted on) 50'
FL	20	Juan Manuel Leguizamón	(substituted on) 65'
SH	21	Felipe Ezcurra	(substituted on) 68'
FH	22	Joaquín Díaz Bonilla	(substituted on) 60'
CE	23	Matías Orlando	(substituted on) 64'
Coach:
(Argentina) Mario Ledesma

Man of the Match:
Marika Koroibete (Australia)

Touch judges:
Paul Williams (New Zealand)
Brendon Pickerill (New Zealand)
Television match official:
Ben Skeen (New Zealand)

Notes:

- Santiago Socino (Argentina) made his international debut.
- Australia retain the Puma Trophy.

=== Round 3 ===
10 August 2019
19:45 AEST (UTC+8)

Australia	47–26	New Zealand
Try: Hodge (2) 9' c, 68 ' c Salakaia-Loto 45' m White 48' m Koroibete 61' c Beale 78' c Con: Lealiifano (2/4) 10', 62'; To'omua (2/2) 70', 79'; Pen: Lealiifano (3/3) 6', 27', 39'	Report	Try: Lienert-Brown 12' c Ioane 16' m B. Barrett 54' c Laumape 70' c Con: Mo'unga (3/4) 13', 55', 71'

Perth Stadium, Perth
Attendance: 61,241
Referee: Jérôme Garcès (France)

FB	15	Kurtley Beale
RW	14	Reece Hodge
OC	13	James O'Connor
IC	12	Samu Kerevi	(substituted off) 70'
LW	11	Marika Koroibete
FH	10	Christian Lealiifano	(substituted off) 63'
SH	9	Nic White	(substituted off) 68'
N8	8	Isi Naisarani
OF	7	Michael Hooper (c)
BF	6	Lukhan Salakaia-Loto
RL	5	Rory Arnold	(substituted off) 55'
LL	4	Izack Rodda	(substituted off) 75'
TP	3	Allan Alaalatoa	(substituted off) 55'
HK	2	Tolu Latu	(substituted off) 63'
LP	1	Scott Sio	(substituted off) 63'
Replacements:
HK	16	Folau Fainga'a	(substituted on) 63'
PR	17	James Slipper	(substituted on) 63'
PR	18	Taniela Tupou	(substituted on) 55'
LK	19	Adam Coleman	(substituted on) 55'
LK	20	Luke Jones	(substituted on) 75'
SH	21	Will Genia	(substituted on) 68'
CE	22	Matt To'omua	(substituted on) 63'
FB	23	Tom Banks	(substituted on) 70'
Coach:
(Australia) Michael Cheika

FB	15	Beauden Barrett
RW	14	Ben Smith		(substituted off) 63'
OC	13	Jack Goodhue		(substituted off) 18'
IC	12	Anton Lienert-Brown
LW	11	Rieko Ioane
FH	10	Richie Mo'unga
SH	9	Aaron Smith		(substituted off) 61'
N8	8	Kieran Read (c)
OF	7	Sam Cane		(substituted off) 49'
BF	6	Ardie Savea
RL	5	Sam Whitelock		(substituted off) 71'
LL	4	Scott Barrett	(red card) 39'
TP	3	Owen Franks		(substituted off) 49'
HK	2	Dane Coles		(substituted off) 55'
LP	1	Joe Moody		(substituted off) 49'
Replacements:
HK	16	Codie Taylor		(substituted on) 55'
PR	17	Atunaisa Moli		(substituted on) 49'
PR	18	Angus Ta'avao		(substituted on) 49'
LK	19	Patrick Tuipulotu		(substituted on) 49'
FL	20	Matt Todd		(substituted on) 71'
SH	21	TJ Perenara		(substituted on) 61'
CE	22	Ngani Laumape		(substituted on) 18'
WG	23	George Bridge		(substituted on) 63'
Coach:
(New Zealand) Steve Hansen

Man of the Match:
Nic White (Australia)

Touch judges:
Jaco Peyper (South Africa)
Shuhei Kubo (Japan)
Television match official:
Marius Jonker (South Africa)

Notes:

- This was the first Bledisloe Cup match played in Western Australia.
- Australia's 47 points was their record score against New Zealand, surpassing the 35 points scored in 2000.
- The All Blacks' 21-point defeat equalled their record loss, set in 1999 against Australia.
- New Zealand finished third in the table for the first time since the 2004 Tri Nations, and the first time since The Rugby Championship's inception.
- Scott Barrett became the fourth New Zealand player to be sent off in an international match, and the first since Sonny Bill Williams against the British and Irish Lions in 2017. Barrett was also the first player to be dismissed in a Bledisloe Cup match since Drew Mitchell in 2010.
- The crowd of 61,241 was the largest to date to attend a sporting event at Perth Stadium.

10 August 2019
16:40 AST (UTC−3)

Argentina	13–46	South Africa (1 BP)
Try: Cordero 1' c Con: Sánchez (1/1) 2'; Pen: Sánchez (2/2) 16', 27'	Report	Try: Mbonambi 12' m Pollard (2) 39' c, 52' m Mapimpi 63' c Kolbe 66 'c Con: Pollard (3/5) 40', 65', 67'; Pen: Pollard (5/5) 8', 18', 25', 30', 41'

Estadio Padre Ernesto Martearena, Salta
Attendance: 22,190
Referee: Romain Poite (France)

FB	15	Emiliano Boffelli
RW	14	Santiago Cordero	(substituted off) 62'
OC	13	Matías Moroni
IC	12	Jerónimo de la Fuente
LW	11	Ramiro Moyano
FH	10	Nicolás Sánchez	(substituted off) 54'
SH	9	Tomás Cubelli	(substituted off) 60'
N8	8	Facundo Isa	(substituted off) 49'
OF	7	Javier Ortega Desio
BF	6	Pablo Matera (c)
RL	5	Marcos Kremer
LL	4	Matías Alemanno	(substituted off) 60'
TP	3	Juan Figallo	(substituted off) 49'
HK	2	Agustín Creevy	(substituted off) 49'
LP	1	Nahuel Tetaz Chaparro	(substituted off) 49'
Replacements:
HK	16	Julián Montoya	(substituted on) 49'
PR	17	Mayco Vivas	(substituted on) 49'
PR	18	Santiago Medrano	(substituted on) 49'
LK	19	Guido Petti	(substituted on) 60'
FL	20	Tomás Lezana	(substituted on) 49'
SH	21	Gonzalo Bertranou	(substituted on) 60'
FH	22	Benjamín Urdapilleta	(substituted on) 54'
FB	23	Joaquín Tuculet	(substituted on) 62'
Coach:
(Argentina) Mario Ledesma

FB	15	Willie le Roux
RW	14	Cheslin Kolbe
OC	13	Lukhanyo Am		(substituted off) 59'
IC	12	Damian de Allende		(substituted off) 65'
LW	11	Makazole Mapimpi
FH	10	Handré Pollard
SH	9	Faf de Klerk	(yellow card) 47' to 57'	(substituted off) 72'
N8	8	Duane Vermeulen (c)		(substituted off) 65'
OF	7	Pieter-Steph du Toit
BF	6	Kwagga Smith		(substituted off) 54'
RL	5	Franco Mostert
LL	4	Eben Etzebeth
TP	3	Trevor Nyakane		(substituted off) 49'
HK	2	Bongi Mbonambi		(substituted off) 46'
LP	1	Tendai Mtawarira		(substituted off) 46'	(substituted on) 77'
Replacements:
HK	16	Malcolm Marx		(substituted on) 46'
PR	17	Steven Kitshoff		(substituted on) 46'	(substituted off) 77'
PR	18	Frans Malherbe		(substituted on) 49'
LK	19	RG Snyman		(substituted on) 65'
FL	20	Francois Louw		(substituted on) 54'
SH	21	Herschel Jantjies		(substituted on) 72'
CE	22	François Steyn		(substituted on) 65'
CE	23	Jesse Kriel		(substituted on) 59'
Coach:
(South Africa) Rassie Erasmus

Man of the Match:
Handré Pollard (South Africa)

Touch judges:
Matthew Carley (England)
Karl Dickson (England)
Television match official:
Rowan Kitt (England)

Notes:

- This was South Africa's biggest winning margin over Argentina in Argentina.
- Handré Pollard's tally of 31 points set a new record for a single player in a Rugby Championship match. It equalled Morné Steyn's Tri Nations record, set against New Zealand in 2009.

== Statistics ==
=== Points scorers ===
Pos.	Player	Team	Pts.
1	Handré Pollard	South Africa	42
2	Beauden Barrett	New Zealand	26
3	Christian Lealiifano	Australia	24
4	Nicolás Sánchez	Argentina	19
5	Reece Hodge	Australia	15
5	Herschel Jantjies	South Africa	15
7	Bernard Foley	Australia	12
8	Elton Jantjies	South Africa	10
8	Ngani Laumape	New Zealand	10
10	Emiliano Boffelli	Argentina	8

=== Try scorers ===
Pos.	Player	Team	Tries
1	Reece Hodge	Australia	3
1	Herschel Jantjies	South Africa	3
3	Ngani Laumape	New Zealand	2
3	Handré Pollard	South Africa	2
5	20 players		1

== Participants ==
Team	Match venues			Head coach	Captain	World Rugby Rankings	
Team	Name	City	Capacity	Head coach	Captain	Start (Note: As of 15 July 2019.)	End (Note: As of 12 August 2019.)
Argentina	José Amalfitani Stadium	Buenos Aires	49,540	Mario Ledesma	Pablo Matera	10th	11th
Argentina	Estadio Padre Ernesto Martearena	Salta	20,408	Mario Ledesma	Pablo Matera	10th	11th
Australia	Lang Park	Brisbane	52,500	Michael Cheika	Michael Hooper	6th	6th
Australia	Perth Stadium	Perth	65,000	Michael Cheika	Michael Hooper	6th	6th
New Zealand	Wellington Regional Stadium	Wellington	34,500	Steve Hansen	Kieran Read	1st	1st
South Africa	Ellis Park Stadium	Johannesburg	62,567	Rassie Erasmus	Siya Kolisi	5th	5th

=== Squads ===
Note: Ages, caps and clubs/franchises are of 20 July 2019.

==== Argentina ====
On 46-man extended squad for the 2019 Rugby Championship and in preparation for the 2019 Rugby World Cup.

Note: Flags indicate national union for the club/province as defined by World Rugby.

Player	Position	Date of birth (age)	Caps	Club/province
Agustín Creevy	Hooker	15 March 1985 (aged 34)	83	(Argentina) Jaguares
Julián Montoya	Hooker	29 October 1993 (aged 25)	51	(Argentina) Jaguares
Santiago Socino	Hooker	7 May 1992 (aged 27)	0	(Argentina) Jaguares
Nahuel Tetaz Chaparro	Prop	11 June 1989 (aged 30)	50	(Argentina) Jaguares
Javier Díaz	Prop	26 July 1995 (aged 23)	3	(Argentina) Jaguares
Juan Figallo	Prop	25 March 1988 (aged 31)	26	(England) Saracens
Santiago García Botta	Prop	19 June 1992 (aged 27)	33	(England) Harlequins
Ramiro Herrera	Prop	14 February 1989 (aged 30)	39	(France) Stade Français
Santiago Medrano	Prop	6 May 1996 (aged 23)	11	(Argentina) Jaguares
Enrique Pieretto	Prop	15 December 1994 (aged 24)	23	(Argentina) Jaguares
Lucio Sordoni	Prop	23 July 1998 (aged 20)	2	(Argentina) Jaguares
Mayco Vivas	Prop	2 June 1998 (aged 21)	0	(Argentina) Jaguares
Juan Pablo Zeiss	Prop	2 August 1989 (aged 29)	6	(Argentina) Jaguares
Matías Alemanno	Lock	5 December 1991 (aged 27)	53	(Argentina) Jaguares
Tomás Lavanini	Lock	22 January 1993 (aged 26)	50	(England) Leicester Tigers
Guido Petti	Lock	17 November 1994 (aged 24)	45	(Argentina) Jaguares
Lucas Paulos	Lock	9 January 1998 (aged 21)	0	(Argentina) Jaguares
Rodrigo Bruni	Loose forward	3 September 1993 (aged 25)	3	(Argentina) San Luis
Facundo Isa	Loose forward	21 September 1993 (aged 25)	25	(France) Toulon
Marcos Kremer	Loose forward	30 July 1997 (aged 21)	21	(Argentina) Jaguares
Juan Manuel Leguizamón	Loose forward	6 June 1983 (aged 36)	85	(Argentina) Jaguares
Tomás Lezana	Loose forward	16 February 1994 (aged 25)	30	(Argentina) Jaguares
Pablo Matera (c)	Loose forward	18 July 1993 (aged 26)	58	(France) Stade Français
Javier Ortega Desio	Loose forward	14 June 1990 (aged 29)	51	(Argentina) Jaguares
Gonzalo Bertranou	Scrum-half	31 December 1993 (aged 25)	19	(Argentina) Jaguares
Tomás Cubelli	Scrum-half	12 June 1989 (aged 30)	69	(Argentina) Jaguares
Felipe Ezcurra	Scrum-half	15 May 1993 (aged 26)	2	(Argentina) Jaguares
Martín Landajo	Scrum-half	14 June 1988 (aged 31)	84	(England) Harlequins
Joaquín Díaz Bonilla	Fly-half	12 April 1989 (aged 30)	1	(Argentina) Jaguares
Domingo Miotti	Fly-half	22 May 1996 (aged 23)	0	(Argentina) Jaguares
Nicolás Sánchez	Fly-half	26 October 1988 (aged 30)	74	(France) Stade Français
Benjamín Urdapilleta	Fly-half	11 March 1986 (aged 33)	10	(France) Castres
Jerónimo de la Fuente	Centre	24 February 1991 (aged 28)	46	(Argentina) Jaguares
Bautista Ezcurra	Centre	21 April 1995 (aged 24)	5	(Argentina) Jaguares
Santiago Gonzalez Iglesias	Centre	16 June 1988 (aged 31)	43	(Argentina) Jaguares
Juan Cruz Mallía	Centre	11 September 1996 (aged 22)	4	(Argentina) Jaguares
Matías Moroni	Centre	29 March 1991 (aged 28)	40	(Argentina) Jaguares
Lucas Mensa	Centre	24 May 1996 (aged 23)	0	(Argentina) Pucará
Matías Orlando	Centre	14 November 1991 (aged 27)	39	(Argentina) Jaguares
Emiliano Boffelli	Wing	16 January 1995 (aged 24)	23	(Argentina) Jaguares
Sebastián Cancelliere	Wing	17 September 1993 (aged 25)	9	(Argentina) Jaguares
Santiago Cordero	Wing	6 December 1993 (aged 25)	33	(France) Bordeaux Bègles
Bautista Delguy	Wing	22 April 1997 (aged 22)	11	(Argentina) Jaguares
Manuel Montero	Wing	20 November 1991 (aged 27)	27	(Argentina) Pucará
Ramiro Moyano	Wing	28 May 1990 (aged 29)	30	(Argentina) Jaguares
Santiago Carreras	Fullback	30 March 1998 (aged 21)	0	(Argentina) Jaguares
Joaquín Tuculet	Fullback	8 August 1989 (aged 29)	51	(Argentina) Jaguares

==== Australia ====
On 4 July, Michael Cheika named a 34-man squad for the 2019 Rugby Championship.

James O'Connor officially joined the squad on 17 July after the completion of signing a contract with Rugby Australia and the Queensland Reds.

Player	Position	Date of birth (age)	Caps	Franchise/province
Tolu Latu	Hooker	23 February 1993 (aged 26)	12	Waratahs
Folau Fainga'a	Hooker	5 May 1995 (aged 24)	7	Brumbies / Canberra Vikings
Jordan Uelese	Hooker	24 January 1997 (aged 22)	2	Rebels / Melbourne Rising
Allan Alaalatoa	Prop	28 January 1994 (aged 25)	32	Brumbies / Canberra Vikings
Sekope Kepu	Prop	5 February 1986 (aged 33)	103	Waratahs
Taniela Tupou	Prop	10 May 1996 (aged 23)	11	Reds / Queensland Country
Tom Robertson	Prop	28 August 1994 (aged 24)	24	Waratahs / Country Eagles
Scott Sio	Prop	16 October 1991 (aged 27)	55	Brumbies / Canberra Vikings
James Slipper	Prop	6 June 1989 (aged 30)	86	Brumbies / Queensland Country
Rory Arnold	Lock	1 July 1990 (aged 29)	19	Brumbies
Luke Jones	Lock	2 April 1991 (aged 28)	3	Rebels / Melbourne Rising
Izack Rodda	Lock	20 August 1996 (aged 22)	17	Reds / Queensland Country
Rob Simmons	Lock	19 April 1989 (aged 30)	94	Waratahs / Sydney
Lukhan Salakaia-Loto	Loose forward	19 September 1996 (aged 22)	11	Reds / Brisbane City
Jack Dempsey	Loose forward	12 April 1994 (aged 25)	10	Waratahs / Sydney
Michael Hooper (c)	Loose forward	29 October 1991 (aged 27)	91	Waratahs / Sydney
Isi Naisarani	Loose forward	14 February 1995 (aged 24)	0	Rebels / Melbourne Rising
Rob Valetini	Loose forward	3 September 1998 (aged 20)	0	Brumbies / Canberra Vikings
Liam Wright	Loose forward	7 November 1997 (aged 21)	0	Reds / Queensland Country
Will Genia	Scrum-half	17 January 1988 (aged 31)	100	Rebels
Joe Powell	Scrum-half	11 April 1994 (aged 25)	4	Brumbies / Canberra Vikings
Nic White	Scrum-half	13 June 1990 (aged 29)	22	Unattached
Bernard Foley	Fly-half	8 September 1989 (aged 29)	68	Waratahs
Christian Lealiifano	Fly-half	24 September 1987 (aged 31)	19	Brumbies
Reece Hodge	Centre	26 August 1994 (aged 24)	33	Rebels / Melbourne Rising
Samu Kerevi	Centre	27 September 1993 (aged 25)	25	Reds
James O'Connor	Centre	5 July 1990 (aged 29)	44	Reds
Matt To'omua	Centre	2 January 1990 (aged 29)	42	Melbourne Rebels
Tevita Kuridrani	Centre	31 March 1991 (aged 28)	58	Brumbies / Canberra Vikings
Adam Ashley-Cooper	Wing	27 March 1984 (aged 35)	117	Waratahs
Marika Koroibete	Wing	26 July 1992 (aged 26)	20	Rebels / Melbourne Rising
Dane Haylett-Petty	Wing	18 June 1989 (aged 30)	31	Rebels / Western Force
Jack Maddocks	Wing	5 February 1997 (aged 22)	7	Rebels / Melbourne Rising
Tom Banks	Fullback	18 June 1994 (aged 25)	3	Brumbies / Canberra Vikings
Kurtley Beale	Fullback	6 January 1989 (aged 30)	83	Waratahs

==== New Zealand ====
On 2 July 2019, Hansen named a 39-man squad ahead of the 2019 Rugby Championship.

Player	Position	Date of birth (age)	Caps	Franchise/province
Asafo Aumua	Hooker	5 March 1997 (aged 22)	0	Hurricanes / Wellington
Dane Coles	Hooker	10 December 1986 (aged 32)	60	Hurricanes / Wellington
Liam Coltman	Hooker	25 January 1990 (aged 29)	4	Highlanders / Otago
Codie Taylor	Hooker	31 March 1991 (aged 28)	41	Crusaders / Canterbury
Owen Franks	Prop	23 December 1987 (aged 31)	106	Crusaders / Canterbury
Nepo Laulala	Prop	6 November 1991 (aged 27)	17	Chiefs / Counties Manukau
Joe Moody	Prop	18 September 1988 (aged 30)	37	Crusaders / Canterbury
Atunaisa Moli	Prop	12 June 1995 (aged 24)	0	Chiefs / Tasman
Angus Ta'avao	Prop	22 March 1990 (aged 29)	3	Chiefs / Taranaki
Karl Tu'inukuafe	Prop	21 February 1993 (aged 26)	13	Blues / North Harbour
Ofa Tu'ungafasi	Prop	19 April 1992 (aged 27)	26	Blues / Auckland
Brodie Retallick	Lock	31 May 1991 (aged 28)	75	Chiefs / Hawke's Bay
Patrick Tuipulotu	Lock	23 January 1993 (aged 26)	21	Blues / Auckland
Sam Whitelock	Lock	12 October 1988 (aged 30)	108	Crusaders / Canterbury
Jackson Hemopo	Lock	14 November 1993 (aged 25)	3	Highlanders / Manawatu
Sam Cane	Loose forward	13 January 1992 (aged 27)	60	Chiefs / Bay of Plenty
Vaea Fifita	Loose forward	17 June 1992 (aged 27)	9	Hurricanes / Wellington
Shannon Frizell	Loose forward	11 February 1994 (aged 25)	4	Highlanders / Tasman
Luke Jacobson	Loose forward	20 April 1997 (aged 22)	0	Chiefs / Waikato
Dalton Papalii	Loose forward	11 October 1997 (aged 21)	2	Blues / Auckland
Kieran Read (c)	Loose forward	26 October 1985 (aged 33)	118	Crusaders / Counties Manukau
Ardie Savea	Loose forward	14 October 1993 (aged 25)	35	Hurricanes / Wellington
Matt Todd	Loose forward	24 March 1988 (aged 31)	17	Crusaders / Canterbury
TJ Perenara	Half-back	23 January 1992 (aged 27)	55	Hurricanes / Wellington
Aaron Smith	Half-back	21 November 1988 (aged 30)	82	Highlanders / Manawatu
Brad Weber	Half-back	17 January 1991 (aged 28)	1	Chiefs / Hawke's Bay
Beauden Barrett	First five-eighth	27 May 1991 (aged 28)	73	Blues / Taranaki
Josh Ioane	First five-eighth	11 July 1995 (aged 24)	0	Highlanders / Otago
Richie Mo'unga	First five-eighth	25 May 1994 (aged 25)	9	Crusaders / Canterbury
Jack Goodhue	Centre	13 June 1995 (aged 24)	7	Crusaders / Northland
Ngani Laumape	Centre	22 April 1993 (aged 26)	10	Hurricanes / Manawatu
Anton Lienert-Brown	Centre	15 April 1995 (aged 24)	33	Chiefs / Waikato
Sonny Bill Williams	Centre	3 August 1985 (aged 33)	51	Blues / Counties Manukau
Braydon Ennor	Wing	16 July 1997 (aged 22)	0	Crusaders / Canterbury
George Bridge	Wing	1 April 1995 (aged 24)	1	Crusaders / Canterbury
Rieko Ioane	Wing	18 March 1997 (aged 22)	24	Blues / Auckland
Sevu Reece	Wing	13 February 1997 (aged 22)	0	Crusaders / Waikato
Ben Smith	Fullback	1 June 1986 (aged 33)	76	Highlanders / Otago
Jordie Barrett	Fullback	17 February 1997 (aged 22)	9	Hurricanes / Taranaki

==== South Africa ====
The following players were named in the South African squad for the 2019 Rugby Championship:

Player	Position	Date of birth (age)	Caps	Club/province
Schalk Brits	Hooker	16 May 1981 (aged 38)	11	(South Africa) Bulls
Malcolm Marx	Hooker	13 July 1994 (aged 25)	24	(South Africa) Lions
Bongi Mbonambi	Hooker	7 January 1991 (aged 28)	26	(South Africa) Stormers
Thomas du Toit	Prop	5 May 1995 (aged 24)	9	(South Africa) Sharks
Lizo Gqoboka	Prop	24 March 1990 (aged 29)	0	(South Africa) Bulls
Steven Kitshoff	Prop	10 February 1992 (aged 27)	37	(South Africa) Stormers
Vincent Koch	Prop	13 March 1990 (aged 29)	13	(England) Saracens
Frans Malherbe	Prop	14 March 1991 (aged 28)	29	(South Africa) Stormers
Tendai Mtawarira	Prop	1 August 1985 (aged 33)	107	(South Africa) Sharks
Trevor Nyakane	Prop	4 May 1989 (aged 30)	37	(South Africa) Bulls
Lood de Jager	Lock	17 December 1992 (aged 26)	38	(South Africa) Bulls
Rynhardt Elstadt	Lock	20 December 1989 (aged 29)	0	(France) Toulouse
Eben Etzebeth	Lock	29 October 1991 (aged 27)	75	(South Africa) Stormers
Franco Mostert	Lock	27 November 1990 (aged 28)	29	(England) Gloucester
Marvin Orie	Lock	15 February 1993 (aged 26)	1	(South Africa) Lions
RG Snyman	Lock	29 January 1995 (aged 24)	12	(South Africa) Bulls
Marcell Coetzee	Loose forward	8 May 1991 (aged 28)	28	(Ireland) Ulster
Pieter-Steph du Toit	Loose forward	20 August 1992 (aged 26)	46	(South Africa) Stormers
Siya Kolisi	Loose forward	16 June 1991 (aged 28)	41	(South Africa) Stormers
Francois Louw	Loose forward	15 June 1985 (aged 34)	65	(England) Bath
Kwagga Smith	Loose forward	11 June 1996 (aged 23)	1	(South Africa) Lions
Duane Vermeulen	Loose forward	3 July 1986 (aged 33)	46	(South Africa) Bulls
Faf de Klerk	Scrum-half	19 October 1991 (aged 27)	21	(England) Sale Sharks
Herschel Jantjies	Scrum-half	22 April 1996 (aged 23)	0	(South Africa) Stormers
Cobus Reinach	Scrum-half	7 February 1990 (aged 29)	10	(England) Northampton Saints
Elton Jantjies	Fly-half	1 August 1990 (aged 28)	33	(South Africa) Lions
Handré Pollard	Fly-half	11 March 1994 (aged 25)	39	(South Africa) Bulls
Lukhanyo Am	Centre	28 November 1993 (aged 25)	6	(South Africa) Sharks
Damian de Allende	Centre	25 November 1991 (aged 27)	37	(South Africa) Stormers
André Esterhuizen	Centre	30 March 1994 (aged 25)	6	(South Africa) Sharks
Jesse Kriel	Centre	15 February 1994 (aged 25)	40	(South Africa) Bulls
François Steyn	Centre	14 May 1987 (aged 32)	56	(France) Montpellier
Aphiwe Dyantyi	Wing	26 August 1994 (aged 24)	13	(South Africa) Lions
Cheslin Kolbe	Wing	28 October 1993 (aged 25)	7	(France) Toulouse
Dillyn Leyds	Wing	12 September 1992 (aged 26)	9	(South Africa) Stormers
Makazole Mapimpi	Wing	26 July 1990 (aged 28)	4	(South Africa) Sharks
S'busiso Nkosi	Wing	21 January 1996 (aged 23)	6	(South Africa) Sharks
Warrick Gelant	Fullback	20 May 1995 (aged 24)	5	(South Africa) Bulls
Willie le Roux	Fullback	18 August 1989 (aged 29)	52	(Japan) Toyota Verblitz

== See also ==
- History of rugby union matches between Argentina and Australia
- History of rugby union matches between Argentina and New Zealand
- History of rugby union matches between Argentina and South Africa
- History of rugby union matches between Australia and South Africa
- History of rugby union matches between Australia and New Zealand
- History of rugby union matches between New Zealand and South Africa
