= Rodrigo Martínez (rugby union) =

Argentine rugby union player

- Born: Rodrigo Martínez Manzano; 7 July 1998 (age 28) Argentina
- Height: 1.87 m (6 ft 1 1/2 in)
- Weight: 112 kg (247 lb; 17 st 9 lb)

Rugby union career
- Position: Prop
Senior career
| Years | Team | Apps | (Points) |
| 2019 | Jaguares XV | 6 | (0) |
| 2020 | Ceibos | 2 | (0) |
| 2021 | Olímpia Lions | 8 | (10) |
| 2021–2022 | Wasps | 0 | (0) |
| 2023– | Dragons | 46 | (5) |
- Correct as of 11:53, 6 February 2024 (UTC)
International career
| Years | Team | Apps | (Points) |
| 2017–2018 | Argentina U20 | 9 | (0) |
| 2020– | Argentina XV | 6 | (5) |
| 2021– | Argentina | 1 | (0) |
- Correct as of 25 September 2021

Rodrigo Martínez (born 7 July 1998) is an Argentine rugby union player. His playing position is prop.

Martínez represented both Ceibos and Olímpia Lions in the Súper Liga Americana de Rugby competition in 2020 and 2021 respectively. He was named in the Argentina squad for the 2021 Rugby Championship. He made his debut in Round 5 of the 2021 Rugby Championship against Australia.

On 1 December 2021, Martinez moved to England as he signed for Wasps in the Premiership Rugby for the rest of the 2021–22 season.

Wasps entered administration on 17 October 2022 and Martínez was made redundant along with all other players and coaching staff.
