= Carlos Muzzio =

Argentine rugby union player (born 1984)

- Born: 21 August 1984 (age 42) Argentina
- Height: 1.80 m (5 ft 11 in)
- Weight: 110 kg (17 st; 240 lb)

Rugby union career
- Position: Prop
Senior career
Years	Team	Apps	(Points)
2010–2012	Vannes	36	(30)
2012–2014	Tarbes	45	(29)
2014–	Mont-de-Marsan	149	(20)
- Correct as of 14 August 2021
International career
Years	Team	Apps	(Points)
2015	Argentina XV	4	(0)
2021–	Argentina	1	(0)
- Correct as of 14 August 2021

Carlos Muzzio (born 21 August 1984) is an Argentine rugby union player, currently playing for Rugby Pro D2 side Mont-de-Marsan. His preferred position is prop.

== Professional career ==
Muzzio represented both Vannes and Tarbes before joining Mont-de-Marsan in 2014. At the age of 36, he was named in the Argentina squad for the 2021 Rugby Championship. He made his debut for Argentina in Round 1 of the Rugby Championship against South Africa.
