= Gonzalo García (rugby union, born 1999) =

Argentine rugby union player

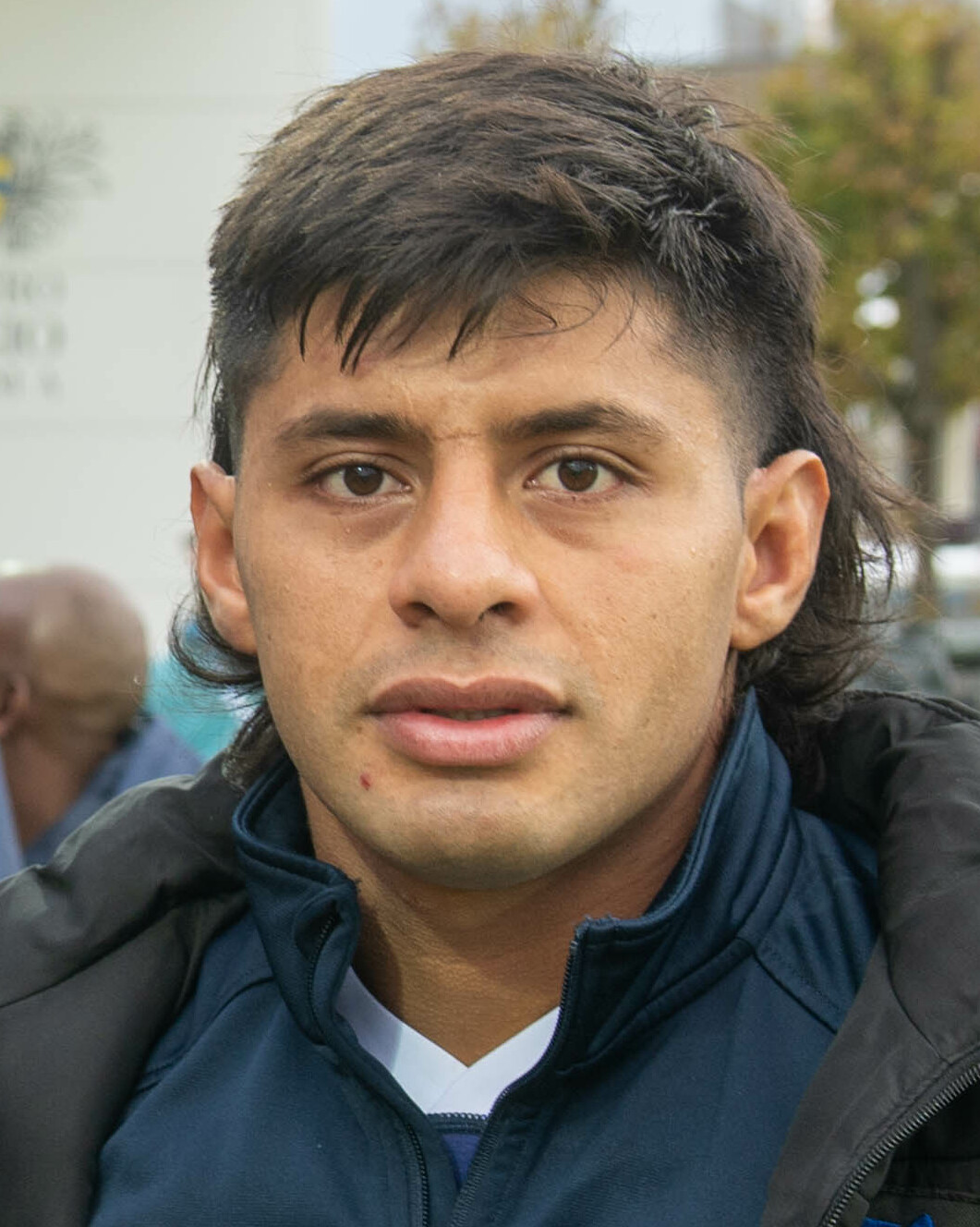
- García in 2023
- Born: Gonzalo Jesus García; 5 March 1999 (age 27) Santa Fe, Argentina
- Height: 1.73 m (5 ft 8 in)
- Weight: 77 kg (12.1 st; 170 lb)

Rugby union career
- Position: Scrum-half
- Current team: Zebre Parma
Amateur team(s)
Years	Team	Apps	(Points)
2018–2019	Natación y Gimnasia	4	(10)
Senior career
Years	Team	Apps	(Points)
2020	Ceibos	2	(0)
2021	Cafeteros Pro	9	(25)
2021–2022	Valorugby Emilia	15	(20)
2022–2026	Zebre Parma	44	(30)
- Correct as of 2 Jun 2025
International career
Years	Team	Apps	(Points)
2017–2019	Argentina U20	15	(5)
2021–	Argentina	16	(5)
- Correct as of 22 September 2024

Gonzalo García (born 5 March 1999) is an Argentine rugby union player, currently playing for United Rugby Championship side Zebre Parma. His preferred position is scrum-half.

== Professional career ==
García represented both Ceibos and Cafeteros Pro in the Súper Liga Americana de Rugby competition in 2020 and 2021 respectively. In 2021−2022 season, he played for ItalianTop10 side Valorugby Emilia.

== International career ==
After the experience with Argentina U20 squad, he was named in the senior Argentina squad for the 2021 Rugby Championship. He made his debut in Round 3 of the 2021 Rugby Championship against New Zealand.
