= History of rugby union matches between Argentina and South Africa =

Argentina and South Africa first met in 1965. Until 2012, these two teams did not tour each other regularly and encounters between them were rare in the professional era.

This changed in 2012, when Argentina joined the SANZAR nations in the annual Rugby Championship tournament (formerly the Tri Nations). Argentina avoided defeat for the first time in the second match of the 2012 Rugby Championship with a draw on home ground, and won for the first time in the shortened Rugby Championship in 2015, in South Africa.

Argentina earned their first home victory over South Africa on 27 August 2016, during the 2016 Rugby Championship.

== Summary ==
=== Overall ===
Details	Played	Won by Argentina	Won by South Africa	Drawn	Argentina points	South Africa points
In Argentina	19	3	15	1	389	614
In South Africa	19	1	18	0	352	724
Neutral venue	3	0	3	0	53	90
Overall	41	4	36	1	794	1,428

=== Records ===
Note: Date shown in brackets indicates when the record was or last set.

Record	Argentina	South Africa
Longest winning streak	1 (25 Aug 2018 – 10 Aug 2019)	14 (6 Nov 1993 – 25 Aug 2012)
Largest points for
Home	33 (12 Nov 2000)	73 (17 Aug 2013)
Away	37 (8 Aug 2015)	52 (13 Nov 1993)
Largest winning margin
Home	13 (25 Aug 2018)	60 (17 Aug 2013)
Away	12 (8 Aug 2015)	33 (10 Aug 2019)
Most aggregate points
97 (South Africa 67 – 30 Argentina) (27 September 2025)

== Results ==
No.	Date	Venue	City	Score	Winner	Competition
1	6 November 1993	Ferro Carril Oeste	Buenos Aires	26–29	South Africa	1993 South Africa tour
2	13 November 1993	Ferro Carril Oeste	Buenos Aires	23–52	South Africa	1993 South Africa tour
3	8 October 1994	Boet Erasmus Stadium	Port Elizabeth	42–22	South Africa	1994 Argentina tour
4	15 October 1994	Ellis Park Stadium	Johannesburg	46–26	South Africa	1994 Argentina tour
5	9 November 1996	Ferro Carril Oeste	Buenos Aires	15–46	South Africa	1996 South Africa tour
6	16 November 1996	Ferro Carril Oeste	Buenos Aires	21–44	South Africa	1996 South Africa tour
7	12 November 2000	Estadio Monumental	Buenos Aires	33–37	South Africa	2000 South Africa tour
8	29 June 2002	Pam Brink Stadium	Springs	49–29	South Africa	2002 Argentina tour
9	28 June 2003	Boet Erasmus Stadium	Port Elizabeth	26–25	South Africa	2003 Argentina tour
10	4 December 2004	José Amalfitani	Buenos Aires	7–39	South Africa	2004 end-of-year test
11	5 November 2005	José Amalfitani	Buenos Aires	23–34	South Africa	2005 end-of-year test
12	14 October 2007	Stade de France	Saint-Denis	13–37	South Africa	2007 World Cup Semi-finals
13	9 August 2008	Ellis Park Stadium	Johannesburg	63–9	South Africa	2008 mid-year test
14	18 August 2012	Newlands Stadium	Cape Town	27–6	South Africa	2012 Rugby Championship
15	25 August 2012	Malvinas Argentinas	Mendoza	16–16	draw	2012 Rugby Championship
16	17 August 2013	FNB Stadium	Johannesburg	73–13	South Africa	2013 Rugby Championship
17	24 August 2013	Malvinas Argentinas	Mendoza	17–22	South Africa	2013 Rugby Championship
18	16 August 2014	Loftus Versfeld Stadium	Pretoria	13–6	South Africa	2014 Rugby Championship
19	23 August 2014	Padre Martearena	Salta	31–33	South Africa	2014 Rugby Championship
20	8 August 2015	Kings Park	Durban	25–37	Argentina	2015 Rugby Championship
21	15 August 2015	José Amalfitani	Buenos Aires	12–26	South Africa	2015 World Cup warm-up match
22	30 October 2015	Olympic Stadium	London	24–13	South Africa	2015 World Cup Bronze final
23	20 August 2016	Mbombela Stadium	Mbombela	30–23	South Africa	2016 Rugby Championship
24	27 August 2016	Padre Martearena	Salta	26–24	Argentina	2016 Rugby Championship
25	19 August 2017	Nelson Mandela Bay Stadium	Port Elizabeth	37–15	South Africa	2017 Rugby Championship
26	26 August 2017	Padre Martearena	Salta	23–41	South Africa	2017 Rugby Championship
27	18 August 2018	Kings Park Stadium	Durban	34–21	South Africa	2018 Rugby Championship
28	25 August 2018	Malvinas Argentinas	Mendoza	32–19	Argentina	2018 Rugby Championship
29	10 August 2019	Padre Martearena	Salta	13–46	South Africa	2019 Rugby Championship
30	17 August 2019	Loftus Versfeld	Pretoria	24–18	South Africa	2019 World Cup warm-up
31	14 August 2021	Nelson Mandela Bay Stadium	Port Elizabeth	32–12	South Africa	2021 Rugby Championship
32	21 August 2021	Nelson Mandela Bay Stadium	Port Elizabeth	29–10	South Africa	2021 Rugby Championship
33	17 September 2022	Estadio Libertadores de América	Buenos Aires	20–36	South Africa	2022 Rugby Championship
34	24 September 2022	Kings Park	Durban	38–21	South Africa	2022 Rugby Championship
35	29 July 2023	Ellis Park	Johannesburg	22–21	South Africa	2023 Rugby Championship
36	5 August 2023	José Amalfitani	Buenos Aires	13–24	South Africa	2023 Rugby World Cup warm-up
37	21 September 2024	Estadio Único Madre de Ciudades	Santiago del Estero	29–28	Argentina	2024 Rugby Championship
38	28 September 2024	Mbombela Stadium	Mbombela	48–7	South Africa	2024 Rugby Championship
39	27 September 2025	Kings Park Stadium	Durban	67–30	South Africa	2025 Rugby Championship
40	4 October 2025	Twickenham Stadium	London	27–29	South Africa	2025 Rugby Championship
41	8 August 2026	José Amalfitani Stadium	Buenos Aires	10–17	South Africa	

== List of series ==
Played	Won by Argentina	Won by South Africa	Drawn
6	0	6	0

Year	Argentina	South Africa	Series winner
1993	0	2	South Africa
1994	0	2	South Africa
1996	0	2	South Africa
2000	0	1	South Africa
2002	0	1	South Africa
2003	0	1	South Africa
