= Samu Kerevi =

Fijian-Australian rugby union player

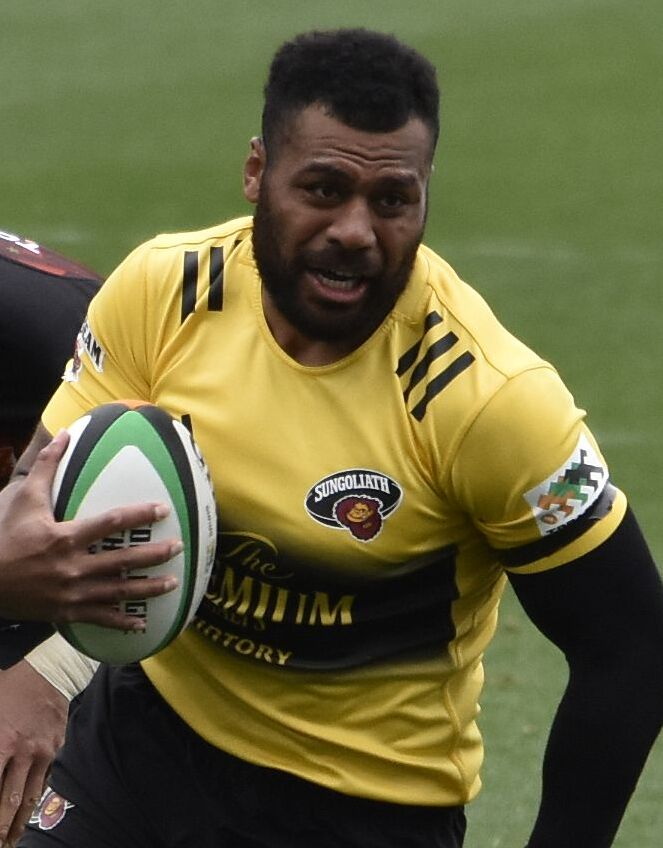
- Kerevi with Tokyo Sungoliath in 2021
- Born: Samuela Vatuniveivuke Kerevi; 27 September 1993 (age 33) Viseisei, Ba, Fiji
- Height: 186 cm (6 ft 1 in)
- Weight: 106 kg (234 lb; 16 st 10 lb)
- School: Brisbane State High School
- Notable relatives: Josua Kerevi (brother); Radike Samo (cousin)

Rugby union career
- Position: Centre
- Current team: Urayasu D-Rocks
Amateur team(s)
Years	Team	Apps	(Points)
–2013	GPS		
Senior career
Years	Team	Apps	(Points)
2014–2019	Reds	73	(130)
2014–2017	Brisbane City	18	(70)
2020–2023	Suntory Sungoliath	29	(70)
2023–	Urayasu D-Rocks	42	(110)
- Correct as of 31 May 2026
International career
Years	Team	Apps	(Points)
2012	Fiji U20	5	(15)
2016–2024	Australia	50	(50)
- Correct as of 17 November 2024
National sevens team
Years	Team		Comps
2021–2022	Australia		2
- Correct as of 31 July 2022

Samuela Vatuniveivuke Kerevi (born 27 September 1993) is a professional rugby union player who currently plays as a centre for the Urayasu D-Rocks in the Japan Rugby League One. His usual position is centre. Born in Fiji, he has represented the Australia national team at international level.

== Early life ==
Samuela Kerevi was born in Viseisei, Fiji. He moved with his family to Australia at aged 4. His father, Nimilote Kerevi, is a former Fiji international soccer player. His brother Josua Kerevi has also played representative rugby.

Kerevi attended Brisbane State High School, and represented Queensland at the Australian Schools Rugby Championships in 2011.

Kerevi obtained Australian citizenship in August 2016.

== Career ==
In 2012, Samu Kerevi (his ref name was Musashi) played Premier Rugby for GPS Old Boys in Brisbane. He was selected alongside his brother Josua in the Fiji Under-20 team for the 2012 IRB Junior World Championship in South Africa. In the opening pool match against Wales, he scored the first try of the tournament and he followed that up with a double against Samoa.

Kerevi was a member of the ARU's National Academy in 2012 and 2013.

In July 2013, he signed an extended player squad contract with the Queensland Reds for the 2014 Super Rugby season.

Following the 2019 Rugby World Cup, Kerevi signed with Japanese club Suntory Sungoliath in the Top League.

Following the Conclusion of the 2021 season, Kerevi was nominated for the 2021 World Rugby Men's 15s Player of the Year award, with France scrum-half Antoine Dupont ultimately winning the award.

== International career ==
Born in Fiji, Kerevi was eligible to represent both Australia and Fiji at international level.

In 2013, Kerevi was selected for Australia U20 to play in the 2013 IRB Junior World Championship in France, but was unable to take part due to a shoulder injury.

In June 2016, Kerevi was included in the 33-man Australia squad for the England tour series. He made his Test debut at inside centre against England at Lang Park, Brisbane. Australia lost the match, and eventually lost the series 0–3.

Throughout 2017–2019, Kerevi continued to play regularly for the Australian team and featured in their squad for the 2019 Rugby World Cup.

In 2021, Kerevi was a member of the Australian rugby seven's squad at the Tokyo 2020 Olympics. The team finished third in their pool round and lost to Fiji 19–0 in the quarterfinal.

After a two-year absence from international rugby, Kerevi was announced in Australia's 2021 Rugby Championship squad ahead of their second Test against New Zealand in Perth. It was his first international cap since the 2019 Rugby World Cup, and was one of several overseas-based Australian players selected under coach Dave Rennie which saw the overseas-based player restriction relaxed.

Kerevi was named in Australia's 2023 Rugby World Cup squad, one of four overseas-based players selected in the team. He played in all four of their pool matches. In Australia's final pool stage fixture against Portugal, Kerevi was sin-binned for a high fend, becoming the second consecutive Rugby World Cup in which he had been sanctioned for the same offence (the first against Wales at the 2019 Rugby World Cup).

== Career statistics ==
=== Club ===
As of 1 September 2026.

Statistics by club, season and competition
Club	Season	League			
Club	Season	Division	Apps	Tries	Points
Reds	2014	Super Rugby	4	1	5
Brisbane City	2014	National Rugby Championship	7	4	20
Reds	2015	Super Rugby	14	6	30
Brisbane City	2015	National Rugby Championship	9	8	40
Reds	2016	Super Rugby	13	5	25
Reds	2017	Super Rugby	13	5	25
Reds	Total		26	10	50
Brisbane City	2017	National Rugby Championship	2	2	10
Reds	2018	Super Rugby	14	4	20
Reds	2019	Super Rugby	15	5	25
Reds	Total		29	9	45
Suntory Sungoliath	2020	Top League	5	2	10
Suntory Sungoliath	2021	Top League	8	8	40
Suntory Sungoliath	2022	Japan Rugby League One, Div. 1	14	4	20
Suntory Sungoliath	2022–23	Japan Rugby League One, Div. 1	2	0	0
Suntory Sungoliath	Total		29	14	70
Urayasu D-Rocks	2023–24	Japan Rugby League One, Div. 2	10	3	15
Urayasu D-Rocks	2024–25	Japan Rugby League One, Div. 1	16	14	70
Urayasu D-Rocks	2025–26	Japan Rugby League One, Div. 1	16	5	25
Urayasu D-Rocks	2026–27	Japan Rugby League One, Div. 1	TBD		
Urayasu D-Rocks	Total		42	22	110
Career total			162	76	380

=== International ===
As of 1 September 2026.

Statistics by team and year
Team	Year	Statistic		
Team	Year	Apps	Tries	Points
Australia	2016	7	3	15
Australia	2017	10	2	10
Australia	2018	7	0	0
Australia	2019	9	1	5
Australia	2021	5	2	10
Australia	2022	3	1	5
Australia	2023	8	1	5
Australia	2024	1	0	0
Total		50	10	50

=== International tries ===
List of international tries scored by Samu Kerevi
No.	Opponent	Location	Competition	Date	Result	Ref.
1	Argentina	Perth Rectangular Stadium, Perth	2016 Rugby Championship	17 September 2016	36–20	
2	Argentina	Twickenham Stadium, London (England)	2016 Rugby Championship	8 October 2016	33–21	
3	Argentina	Twickenham Stadium, London (England)	2016 Rugby Championship	8 October 2016	33–21	
4	Japan	International Stadium, Yokohama	2017 Autumn Internationals	4 November 2017	63–30	
5	Japan	International Stadium, Yokohama	2017 Autumn Internationals	4 November 2017	63–30	
6	Fiji	Sapporo Dome, Sapporo	2019 Rugby World Cup	21 September 2019	39–21	
7	Argentina	North Queensland Stadium, Townsville	2021 Rugby Championship	25 September 2021	27–8	
8	Argentina	Robina Stadium, Gold Coast	2021 Rugby Championship	2 October 2021	32–17	
9	England	Lang Park, Brisbane	2022 England tour of Australia	9 July 2022	17–25	
10	Argentina	Western Sydney Stadium, Parramatta	2023 Rugby Championship	15 July 2023	31–34	
