= Facundo Gigena =

Argentine rugby union player

- Born: 15 September 1994 (age 32) Córdoba, Argentina
- Height: 1.82 m (6 ft 0 in)
- Weight: 118 kg (18 st 8 lb; 260 lb)

Rugby union career
- Position: Loosehead Prop
- Current team: Pau
Amateur team(s)
Years	Team	Apps	(Points)
2014−2016	Tala	3	(0)
Senior career
Years	Team	Apps	(Points)
2016	Jaguares	5	(0)
2018–2021	Leicester Tigers	47	(5)
2021–2023	London Irish	48	(5)
2023–2024	Pau	8	(5)
2024–	Stade Niçois	17	(5)
- Correct as of 16 April 2025
International career
Years	Team	Apps	(Points)
2012	Argentina Under-18	1	(0)
2013	Argentina Under-19	3	(0)
2013−14	Argentina Under-20	16	(10)
2016	Argentina	7	(0)
2022	Argentina XV	1	(0)
- Correct as of 16 April 2025

Facundo Gigena (born 15 September 1994) is an Argentine international rugby union player who plays in the prop position for Pau (Section Paloise). He previously played for London Irish in England's Premiership Rugby. He recently played for Leicester Tigers between 2018 and 2021 when he played 45 games.

== International career ==
Gigena represented Argentina at both Under 18 and 19 level before being selected in the Under-20 sides which competed in the World Championships in 2013 and 2014. He made his senior international debut in a match against Chile in Santiago on June 4, 2016, and marked his first appearance with a try in an 87–12 victory for his side.

== Super Rugby statistics ==
As of 21 August 2016

Season	Team	Games	Starts	Sub	Mins	Tries	Cons	Pens	Drops	Points	Yel	Red
2016	Jaguares	5	0	5	93	0	0	0	0	0	0	0
Total		5	0	5	93	0	0	0	0	0	0	0

== Leicester Tigers ==
Gigena signed for Leicester Tigers on 19 January 2018. He made his debut against Cardiff Blues in the Anglo-Welsh Cup on 27 January 2018. He was released on 8 February 2021.

== London Irish ==
Following his departure from Leicester Tigers he signed for London Irish.
