= Nico Janse van Rensburg =

South African rugby union player

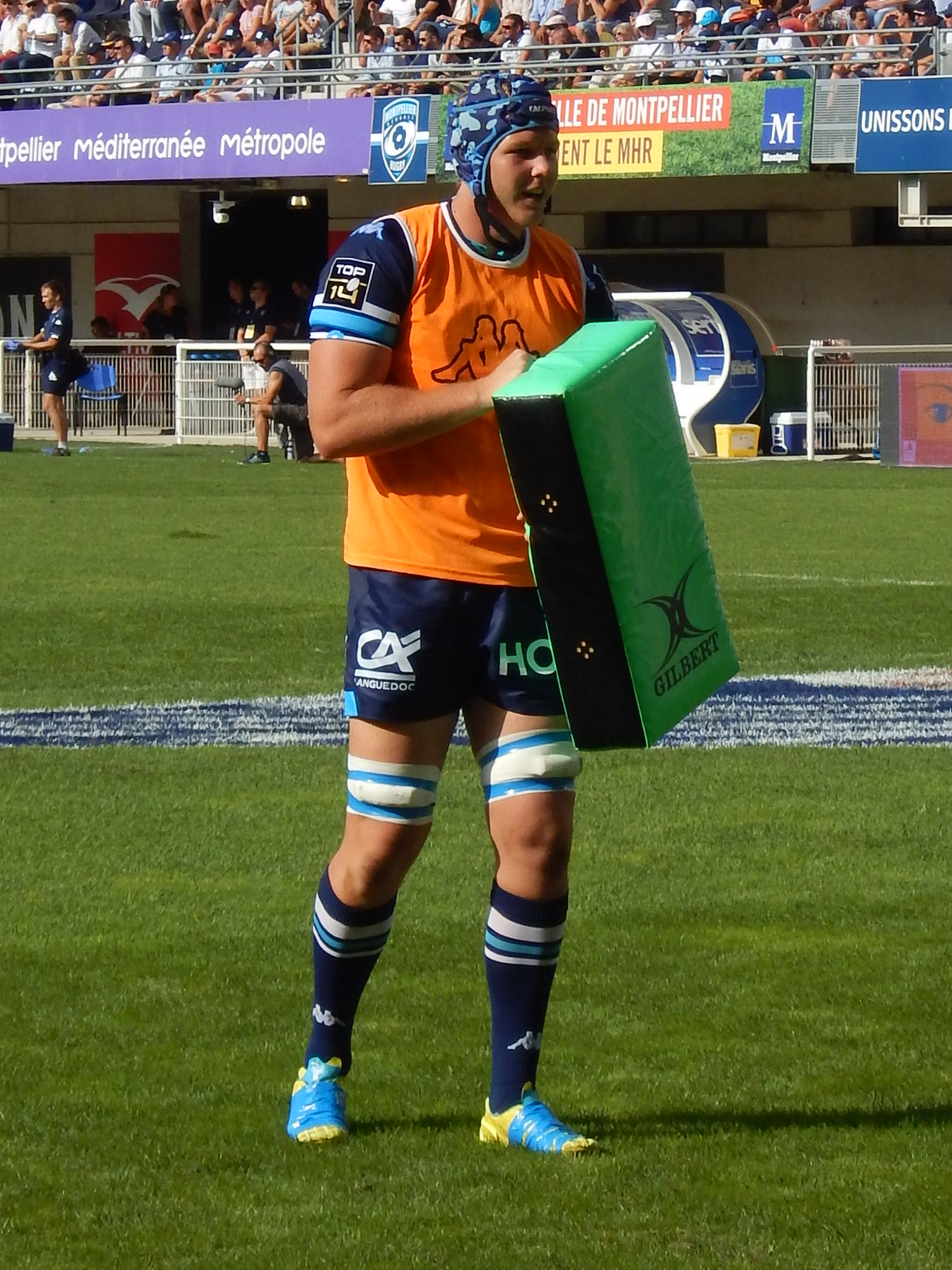
- Janse van Rensburg in 2016
- Full name: Nicolaas Jacobus Janse van Rensburg
- Born: 6 May 1994 (age 32) Pretoria, South Africa
- Height: 2.00 m (6 ft 6 1/2 in)
- Weight: 115 kg (18 st 2 lb; 254 lb)
- School: Afrikaanse Hoër Seunskool
- University: University of Pretoria
- Occupation: Professional Rugby Player

Rugby union career
- Position: Lock
- Current team: Montpellier
Youth career
- 2010–2015: Blue Bulls
Senior career
Years	Team	Apps	(Points)
2014–2016	Blue Bulls	26	(0)
2014–2016	Bulls	5	(0)
2016–present	Montpellier	170	(90)
- Correct as of 8 March 2020
International career
Years	Team	Apps	(Points)
2012	South Africa Schools	2	(0)
2014	South Africa Under-20	5	(0)
2021	South Africa 'A'	2	(0)
2021	South Africa	1	(0)
- Correct as of 26 August 2021

Nicolaas Jacobus Janse van Rensburg (born 6 May 1994) is a South African professional rugby union player, currently playing with Montpellier in the French Top 14. His regular position is lock.

== Career ==
=== Youth ===
He represented the Blue Bulls at the Under-16 Grant Khomo Week in 2010 and at the Under-18 Craven Week in 2012. As a result of the latter, he earned a call-up to the South African Schools side in 2012, where he started in two of their matches, against Wales and England.

In 2013, he was included in the Blue Bulls U19 squad for the 2013 Under-19 Provincial Championship. He scored a try in his first match for the side against the Leopards and made a total of nine appearances, including the final of the competition, where the Blue Bulls beat the Golden Lions U19 side to win the trophy.

He was selected in the South Africa Under-20 squad that participated at the 2014 IRB Junior World Championship. He started in all five their matches during the competition – after featuring in their pool stage victories over Scotland, New Zealand and Samoa, which saw South Africa qualify for the finals, he then started their semi-final against New Zealand and the final against England, but couldn't prevent them suffering a 21–20 defeat in the final.

=== Blue Bulls ===
Janse van Rensburg made his first class debut during the 2014 Vodacom Cup competition when he played off the bench in a match against Griquas in Pretoria. A second substitute appearance followed a week later against the Pumas in Nelspruit.

=== Montpellier ===
Janse van Rensburg moved to France in 2016 to join Top 14 side Montpellier.

=== South Africa 'A' ===
In 2021, Janse van Rensburg was included in the South Africa 'A' team that played against the touring British and Irish Lions team. He came on as a replacement in their match in Cape Town, ending on the winning side as the South Africa 'A' team ran out 17–13 winners.
