= Santiago Medrano =

Argentine rugby union player (born 1996)

- Born: 6 May 1996 (age 30) Buenos Aires, Argentina
- Height: 6 ft 1 in (1.85 m)
- Weight: 254 lb (115 kg; 18 st 2 lb)

Rugby union career
- Position: Prop
Senior career
Years	Team	Apps	(Points)
2015–2017	Regatas Bella Vista	45	(20)
2022	Worcester Warriors		
- Correct as of 5 October 2022
Super Rugby
Years	Team	Apps	(Points)
2018–2020	Jaguares	30	(5)
2021–	Western Force	50	(5)
- Correct as of 1 June 2024
International career
Years	Team	Apps	(Points)
2015−2016	Argentina Under 20	8	(0)
2016−2018	Argentina XV	14	(10)
2018−	Argentina	33	(0)
- Correct as of 19 November 2022

Santiago Medrano (born 6 May 1996) is an Argentine rugby union player. His position of choice is prop. He most recently played for Worcester Warriors in Premiership Rugby until their holding company was liquidated and all Warriors players had their contracts terminated on 5 October 2022.
