= Izack Rodda =

Australia international rugby union player

- Full name: Izack Rodda
- Born: 20 August 1996 (age 30) Lismore, New South Wales, Australia
- Height: 2.02 m (6 ft 7 1/2 in)
- Weight: 123 kg (19 st 5 lb; 271 lb)
- School: Ipswich Grammar

Rugby union career
- Position: Lock
Amateur team(s)
Years	Team	Apps	(Points)
2015–20	Easts Tigers		
Senior career
Years	Team	Apps	(Points)
2016–2020	Queensland Country	9	(6)
2020–2021	Lyon	25	(15)
2024–	Provence	16	(0)
- Correct as of 13 February 2025
Super Rugby
Years	Team	Apps	(Points)
2017–2020	Reds	46	(15)
2022–2024	Force	20	(0)
- Correct as of 1 June 2024
International career
Years	Team	Apps	(Points)
2014	Australia Schoolboys		
2016	Australia U-20	6	(5)
2017–21	Australia	25	(5)
- Correct as of 29 November 2020

Izack Rodda (born 20 August 1996) is an Australian professional rugby union player. He signed for Provence Rugby for the 2024/25 season after leaving Western Force in Super Rugby. Rodda previously played for the Queensland Reds and French Top 14 team Lyon OU. He is capped for the Australian national team and played at the Rugby World Cup in 2019. His regular position is lock.

== Family and early life ==
Izack Rodda was born in Lismore in Northern New South Wales, around 40 kilometres north of his home town of Evans Head. He started playing junior rugby union on the Far North Coast for Lismore City Rugby Club. Rodda was selected for NSW Country junior teams, and also played some rugby league in his early years as a lock forward or prop.

The young Rodda switched his focus to playing rugby union at the age of thirteen, initially as a number eight but later at lock as he grew in stature. He attended Evans River K-12 School, before moving to Ipswich Grammar in Queensland for his final two years of high school and was selected for the Australian Schoolboys rugby team in 2014.

== Rugby career ==
Rodda joined the Easts Tigers club in Brisbane to play Queensland Premier Rugby, and he represented the Queensland Under-20 team in 2015 and 2016. He signed a train-on contract with the Queensland Reds in 2016, and played in the National Rugby Championship that year for Queensland Country where former All Blacks test lock Brad Thorn coached the forwards squad.

In 2017, he made his Super Rugby debut for the Reds in the opening round of the season, playing South African team the Sharks in Brisbane, as a substitute for Rob Simmons in the final 18 minutes of a 28–26 win. He played his first match as a starter for the Reds in Brisbane two weeks later against New Zealand side the Crusaders in a narrow 20–22 loss.

Rodda was selected for the Wallabies squad by national coach Michael Cheika in the lead up to The Rugby Championship series of 2017. He gained his first Test cap for Australia in the final stages of the second Bledisloe Cup match of 2017, in a close 35–29 loss to New Zealand at Dunedin.

In June 2020, Rodda signed with French Top 14 side LOU on a one-year contract. Rodda had previously left the Reds following a refusal to take a pay cut in May 2020.

He returned to Australia in 2021 and played three seasons at the Western Force, before moving back to France to join Provence Rugby ahead of the 2024–25 season.

== Super Rugby statistics ==
As of 29 February 2020:

Season	Team	Apps	Start	Sub	Mins	T	C	PG	DG	Pts	YC	RC
2017	Reds	12	5	7	425	1	0	0	0	5	0	0
2018	Reds	15	15	0	1166	1	0	0	0	5	0	0
2019	Reds	14	14	0	1104	1	0	0	0	5	0	0
2020	Reds	5	4	1	296	0	0	0	0	0	0	0
2022	Force	11	10	1		0	0	0	0	0	0	0
2023	Force	2	1	1		0	0	0	0	0	0	0
2024	Force	7	5	2		0	0	0	0	0	0	0
Total		66	54	12	2991	3	0	0	0	15	0	0
