= Santiago Socino =

Argentine rugby union player

- Born: Santiago G. Socino; 7 May 1992 (age 34) Buenos Aires
- Height: 6 ft 2 in (188 cm)
- Weight: 251 lb (114 kg)
- Notable relative: Juan Pablo Socino (Brother)

Rugby union career
- Position: Hooker
- Current team: Gloucester
Senior career
Years	Team	Apps	(Points)
2013–2015	Hull RUFC	19	(10)
2014–2015	Hull Ionians	7	(15)
2015–2019	Newcastle Falcons	34	(5)
2015–2017	→Darlington Mowden Park (loan)	39	(30)
2016–2017	→Rotherham Titans (loan)	6	(0)
2019–2021	Jaguares	1	(0)
2021–	Gloucester	1	(5)
- Correct as of 19 May 2019
International career
Years	Team	Apps	(Points)
2019-	Argentina	6	(0)
- Correct as of 18 September 2019

Santiago G. Socino (born 7 May 1992) is an Argentine rugby union player for Gloucester in Premiership Rugby, his primary position is hooker. He previously played for Newcastle Falcons in Premiership Rugby and Jaguares in Super Rugby. Socino moved to England in 2013 to play for Hull RUFC and has also played for Hull Ionians, Darlington Mowden Park, and Rotherham Titans.

Socino originally moved to England as a back row but converted to the front row after signing for Newcastle in 2015. After impressing on loan at Darlington, Socino signed a new contract with Newcastle in May 2016. He renewed his contract again in March 2018.

In March 2019 he was visited by Argentina coach Mario Ledesma who was contacting European based players with potential to be selected internationally. It was then announced on 20 May 2019 that Socino was to return to Argentina to join Super Rugby's Jaguares.

In February 2021 it was confirmed that he had signed for Gloucester with immediate effect.
