= Tomás Lezana =

Argentine rugby player (born 1994)

- Full name: Tomás Lezana
- Born: 16 February 1994 (age 32) Santiago del Estero, Argentina
- Height: 1.88 m (6 ft 2 in)
- Weight: 105 kg (16 st 7 lb; 231 lb)

Rugby union career
- Position: Flanker
- Current team: US Montauban
Youth career
- Santiago Lawn Tennis Club
Amateur team(s)
Years	Team	Apps	(Points)
2013−2020	Santiago Lawn Tennis Club		
Senior career
Years	Team	Apps	(Points)
2015	Pampas XV	3	(0)
2016−2020	Jaguares	47	(5)
2021	Western Force	5	(0)
2021−2023	Scarlets	17	(10)
2023–	US Montauban		
- Correct as of 20 March 2023
International career
Years	Team	Apps	(Points)
2012	Argentina Under-18	1	(0)
2012−13	Argentina Under-19	6	(20)
2013−14	Argentina Under-20	10	(25)
2014	Argentina Jaguars	2	(5)
2014–	Argentina	34	(15)
- Correct as of 18 September 2019

Tomás Lezana (born 16 February 1994) is an Argentine rugby union player who plays as a loose forward for US Montauban, and the Argentina national rugby union team.

== Career ==
Lezana began his career, playing with the Santiago Lawn Tennis Club from 2013 before being signed by the Jaguares in 2016, who he played for until 2020. In December 2020 he was signed by the Western Force to play in the 2021 Super Rugby AU season and Super Rugby Trans-Tasman.

== International career ==
Lezana was a member of the Argentina Under-20 side which competed in the 2013 and 2014 IRB Junior World Championships, he also represented the Argentina Jaguars team in 2014 in their matches against Uruguay and Canada A.

Lezana made his senior debut for Los Pumas on 22 November 2014, coming on as an early replacement for the injured Leonardo Senatore in an 18 -13 win over France in Paris.
