= Luke Jacobson =

New Zealand rugby union player

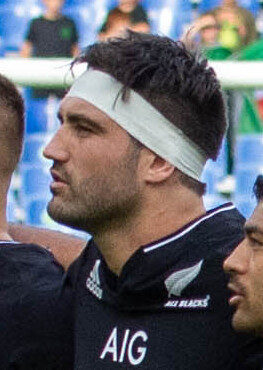
- Jacobson in 2021
- Full name: Luke Brittain Jacobson
- Born: 20 April 1997 (age 29) Cambridge, New Zealand
- Height: 191 cm (6 ft 3 in)
- Weight: 107 kg (236 lb; 16 st 12 lb)
- School: Cambridge High School
- Notable relative: Mitch Jacobson (brother)

Rugby union career
- Position(s): Flanker, Number 8
- Current team: Waikato, Chiefs
Senior career
| Years | Team | Apps | (Points) |
| 2017– | Waikato | 31 | (20) |
| 2018– | Chiefs | 106 | (85) |
- Correct as of 28 August 2026
International career
| Years | Team | Apps | (Points) |
| 2016–2017 | New Zealand U20 | 15 | (25) |
| 2019– | New Zealand | 29 | (30) |
| 2022 | All Blacks XV | 1 | (0) |
- Correct as of 28 August 2026
Medal record
Men's Rugby union
Representing New Zealand
Rugby World Cup
| Silver medal – second place | 2023 France | Squad |
| Bronze medal – third place | 2019 Japan | Squad |

Luke Brittain Jacobson (born 20 April 1997) is a New Zealand rugby union player who plays for the Chiefs in the Super Rugby competition, and for the All Blacks. He plays in the forward pack.

== Career ==
Jacobson made the New Zealand Schools team in 2014. He played for the New Zealand Under 20 team in 2016 and (as captain) in 2017.

He made his Super Rugby debut in 2018 against the Blues at Eden Park.

Jacobson made his All Blacks debut in July 2019, in the final quarter of a narrow 20–16 win against Argentina. in the Rugby Championship. Following his second test, which was a 92–7 win over Tonga, Jacobson was named in New Zealand's squad for the 2019 Rugby World Cup, despite having around only 50 minutes' worth of international rugby. Jacobson did not play in the World Cup however, as he experienced a delayed onset of concussion symptoms. Shannon Frizell was called up as Jacobson's injury cover. Jacobson was named in the 2021 All Blacks squad.

== Honours ==
New Zealand

- Rugby World Cup / Webb Ellis Cup
  - Third-place: 2019
  - Runners-up: 2023

Chiefs

- Super Rugby Aotearoa
  - Runners-up: 2021
- Super Rugby Pacific
  - Runners-up: 2023, 2024, 2025, 2026
