= Matías Alemanno =

Argentine rugby union player (born 1991)

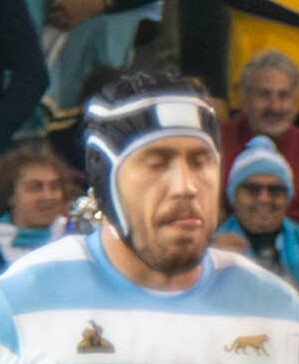
- Born: 5 December 1991 (age 34) Córdoba, Argentina
- Height: 1.98 m (6 ft 6 in)
- Weight: 112 kg (247 lb; 17 st 9 lb)

Rugby union career
- Position: Lock
- Current team: Gloucester
Senior career
Years	Team	Apps	(Points)
2013–2015	Pampas XV	9	(0)
2016−2020	Jaguares	46	(20)
2020–2026	Gloucester	100	(65)
- Correct as of 4 Mar 2026
International career
Years	Team	Apps	(Points)
2009−2010	Argentina U19	4	(5)
2010−2011	Argentina U20	13	(0)
2012−2013	Argentina Jaguars	9	(0)
2014−	Argentina	100	(25)
- Correct as of 28 August 2023

Matías Alemanno (born 5 December 1991) is an Argentine professional rugby union player who plays as a lock for Premiership Rugby club Gloucester and the Argentina national team.

== Club career ==
He was a member of the Pampas XV squad for the 2013 Vodacom Cup in South Africa and he also went on their tour of Australia in 2014.

Alemanno was signed to play for Jaguares until 2020 after which he moved to England to join Gloucester.

== International career ==
Alemmano was a member of the Argentina Under-20 sides which competed in the 2010 and 2011 IRB Junior World Championships and later went on to play for Argentina's representative teams, the Jaguars and the Pampas XV.

He made his senior debut for Los Pumas on 17 May 2014, scoring a try in Argentina's comfortable win over Uruguay. He also played in the victory over Chile a week later and played in all of his country's 3 matches during the 2014 mid-year rugby union internationals series.

In August 2014, he was named in the squad for the 2014 Rugby Championship.

Alemanno was a starter for the Argentina national team on 14 November 2020 in their first ever win against the All Blacks.
