= 2023 Rugby World Cup knockout stage =

Second and final stage of the competition

The knockout stage of the 2023 Rugby World Cup was the second and final stage of the competition, following the pool stage. Played from 14 to 28 October, the knockout stage ended with the final, held at Stade de France in Saint-Denis. The top two teams from each pool advanced to the knockout stage to compete in a single-elimination tournament. There was 8 matches in the knockout stage, including a third-place play-off played between the two losing teams of the semi-finals.

== Format ==
The knockout stage of the 2023 Rugby World Cup was contested by the eight teams that qualified from the pool stage, the top two teams from each of the four pools. Matches in the knockout stage were played to a result; if the scores were tied at the end of 80 minutes, a 10-minute period of extra time was played; if scores remained level after extra time, an additional 10-minute "sudden death" period would be played, and the first team to score any points wins. If the score still remains tied, a kicking competition will ensue. All times listed are local in Central European Summer Time (UTC+2).

== Qualified teams ==
Wales were the first side to secure qualification to the knockout stage after their record breaking victory over Australia in the pool stage. England became the next side to qualify for the quarter-finals four days later after Japan's victory over Samoa in Pool D. This result also meant England were the first team to be guaranteed top seed. New Zealand secured their place in the knockout stage after their pool match win over Uruguay. Hosts France also confirmed their place the following day after their victory over Italy. Ireland and South Africa both qualified from Pool B simultaneously following Ireland's victory over Scotland. Argentina edged Japan to progression from Pool D following their victory over the Brave Blossoms in their final match. In the last match of the pool stage, Fiji were narrowly defeated by Portugal in Pool C but still qualified for the knockout stage ahead of Australia based on their head-to-head record against the Wallabies who suffered elimination from the World Cup at the pool stage for the first time.

Pool	Winners	Runners-up
A	France	New Zealand
B	Ireland	South Africa
C	Wales	Fiji
D	England	Argentina

== Bracket ==
Quarter-finals
14 October – Marseille
Wales	17
Argentina	29
14 October – Saint-Denis
Ireland	24
New Zealand	28
15 October – Marseille
England	30
Fiji	24
15 October – Saint-Denis
France	28
South Africa	29

Semi-finals
20 October – Saint-Denis
Argentina	6
New Zealand	44
21 October – Saint-Denis
England	15
South Africa	16

Final
28 October – Saint-Denis
New Zealand	11
South Africa	12
Bronze final
27 October – Saint-Denis
Argentina	23
England	26

== Quarter-finals ==
=== Wales vs Argentina ===
14 October 2023
17:00 CEST (UTC+2)

Wales	17–29	Argentina
Try: Biggar 14' c T. Williams 57' c Con: Biggar (2/2) 16', 58'; Pen: Biggar (1/2) 21'	Report	Try: Sclavi 68' c Sánchez 77' c Con: Boffelli (2/2) 69', 78'; Pen: Boffelli (4/5) 39', 45', 44', 48'; Sánchez (1/1) 80'

Stade Vélodrome, Marseille
Attendance: 62,576
Referee: Jaco Peyper (South Africa)
Karl Dickson (England) (Note: Referee Jaco Peyper (South Africa) was forced to withdraw in the 16th minute of the quarter final between Wales and Argentina, after sustaining a calf injury. He was replaced by assistant referee Karl Dickson (England). Reserve official Jordan Way (Australia) took Dickson's place as an assistant.)

Wales	Argentina

FB	15	Liam Williams	(substituted off) 60'
RW	14	Louis Rees-Zammit
OC	13	George North
IC	12	Nick Tompkins	(substituted off) 65'	(substituted on) 75'
LW	11	Josh Adams
FH	10	Dan Biggar		(substituted off) 75'
SH	9	Gareth Davies	(substituted off) 50'
N8	8	Aaron Wainwright
OF	7	Tommy Reffell	(substituted off) 55'
BF	6	Jac Morgan (c)
RL	5	Adam Beard	(substituted off) 66'
LL	4	Will Rowlands
TP	3	Tomas Francis	(substituted off) 66'
HK	2	Ryan Elias	(substituted off) 41'
LP	1	Gareth Thomas	(substituted off) 55'
Replacements:
HK	16	Dewi Lake	(substituted on) 41'
PR	17	Corey Domachowski	(substituted on) 55'
PR	18	Dillon Lewis	(substituted on) 66'
LK	19	Dafydd Jenkins	(substituted on) 66'
LK	20	Christ Tshiunza	(substituted on) 55'
SH	21	Tomos Williams	(substituted on) 50'
FH	22	Sam Costelow	(substituted on) 65'
WG	23	Rio Dyer	(substituted on) 60'
Coach:
(New Zealand) Warren Gatland

FB	15	Juan Cruz Mallía
RW	14	Emiliano Boffelli
OC	13	Lucio Cinti
IC	12	Santiago Chocobares	(substituted off) 27'
LW	11	Mateo Carreras
FH	10	Santiago Carreras	(substituted off) 69'
SH	9	Tomás Cubelli	(substituted off) 55'
N8	8	Facundo Isa	(substituted off) 55'
OF	7	Marcos Kremer
BF	6	Juan Martín González
RL	5	Tomás Lavanini	(substituted off) 55'
LL	4	Guido Petti
TP	3	Francisco Gómez Kodela	(substituted off) 55'
HK	2	Julián Montoya (c)	(substituted off) 66'
LP	1	Thomas Gallo	(substituted off) 66'
Replacements:
HK	16	Agustín Creevy	(substituted on) 66'
PR	17	Joel Sclavi	(substituted on) 66'
PR	18	Eduardo Bello	(substituted on) 55'
LK	19	Matías Alemanno	(substituted on) 55'
N8	20	Rodrigo Bruni	(substituted on) 55'
SH	21	Lautaro Bazán	(substituted on) 55'
FH	22	Nicolás Sánchez	(substituted on) 69'
CE	23	Matías Moroni	(substituted on) 27'
Coach:
(Australia) Michael Cheika

Player of the Match:
Emiliano Boffelli (Argentina)

Assistant referees:
Karl Dickson (England), Jordan Way (Australia)
Andrea Piardi (Italy)
Television match official:
Marius Jonker (South Africa)

Notes:

- Referee Jaco Peyper was forced to withdraw from the match in the 16th minute, after sustaining a calf injury. He was replaced by assistant referee Karl Dickson. Reserve official Jordan Way took Dickson's place as an assistant.

=== Ireland vs New Zealand ===
14 October 2023
21:00 CEST (UTC+2)

Ireland	24–28	New Zealand
Try: Aki 27' c Gibson-Park 39' c Penalty try 64'; Con: Sexton (2/2) 29', 40'; Pen: Sexton (1/2) 22'	Report	Try: Fainga'anuku 19' c Savea 33' m Jordan 53' c Con: Mo'unga (1/2) 21'; J. Barrett (1/1) 54'; Pen: Mo'unga (1/1) 8'; J. Barrett (2/3) 14', 69'

Stade de France, Saint-Denis
Attendance: 78,845
Referee: Wayne Barnes (England)

Ireland	New Zealand

FB	15	Hugo Keenan
RW	14	Mack Hansen	(substituted off) 56'
OC	13	Garry Ringrose
IC	12	Bundee Aki
LW	11	James Lowe
FH	10	Johnny Sexton (c)
SH	9	Jamison Gibson-Park	(substituted off) 61'
N8	8	Caelan Doris
OF	7	Josh van der Flier	(substituted off) 59'
BF	6	Peter O'Mahony
RL	5	Iain Henderson	(substituted off) 59'
LL	4	Tadhg Beirne
TP	3	Tadhg Furlong	(substituted off) 53'
HK	2	Dan Sheehan	(substituted off) 64'
LP	1	Andrew Porter	(substituted off) 76'
Replacements:
HK	16	Rónan Kelleher	(substituted on) 64'
PR	17	Dave Kilcoyne	(substituted on) 76'
PR	18	Finlay Bealham	(substituted on) 53'
LK	19	Joe McCarthy	(substituted on) 59'
N8	20	Jack Conan	(substituted on) 59'
SH	21	Conor Murray	(substituted on) 61'
FH	22	Jack Crowley
FB	23	Jimmy O'Brien	(substituted on) 56'
Coach:
(England) Andy Farrell

FB	15	Beauden Barrett
RW	14	Will Jordan
OC	13	Rieko Ioane
IC	12	Jordie Barrett
LW	11	Leicester Fainga'anuku		(substituted off) 64'
FH	10	Richie Mo'unga
SH	9	Aaron Smith	(yellow card) 37'
N8	8	Ardie Savea
OF	7	Sam Cane (c)		(substituted off) 75'
BF	6	Shannon Frizell		(substituted off) 59'
RL	5	Scott Barrett
LL	4	Brodie Retallick		(substituted off) 65'	(substituted on) 75'
TP	3	Tyrel Lomax		(substituted off) 61'
HK	2	Codie Taylor	(yellow card) 64'		(substituted off) 75'
LP	1	Ethan de Groot		(substituted off) 61'
Replacements:
HK	16	Dane Coles		(substituted on) 65'
PR	17	Tamaiti Williams		(substituted on) 61'
PR	18	Fletcher Newell		(substituted on) 61'
LK	19	Sam Whitelock		(substituted on) 59'
FL	20	Dalton Papalii		(substituted on) 75'
SH	21	Finlay Christie
FB	22	Damian McKenzie
CE	23	Anton Lienert-Brown		(substituted on) 64'
Coach:
(New Zealand) Ian Foster

Player of the Match:
Ardie Savea (New Zealand)

Assistant referees:
Matthew Carley (England)
Christophe Ridley (England)
Television match official:
Tom Foley (England)

=== England vs Fiji ===
15 October 2023
17:00 CEST (UTC+2)

England	30–24	Fiji
Try: Tuilagi 14' m Marchant 23' c Con: Farrell (1/2) 23'; Pen: Farrell (5/6) 11', 34', 38', 54', 78'; Drop: Farrell (1/1) 72'	Report	Try: Mata 28' c Ravai 64' c Botitu 68' c Con: Lomani (1/1) 29'; Kuruvoli (2/2) 65', 70'; Pen: Lomani (1/3) 20'

Stade Vélodrome, Marseille
Attendance: 61,863
Referee: Mathieu Raynal (France)

England	Fiji

FB	15	Marcus Smith	23' to 36'
RW	14	Jonny May			(substituted off) 65'
OC	13	Joe Marchant
IC	12	Manu Tuilagi
LW	11	Elliot Daly
FH	10	Owen Farrell (c)
SH	9	Alex Mitchell	(substituted off) 60'
N8	8	Ben Earl
OF	7	Tom Curry	(substituted off) 74'
BF	6	Courtney Lawes
RL	5	Ollie Chessum	(substituted off) 70'
LL	4	Maro Itoje
TP	3	Dan Cole	(substituted off) 60'
HK	2	Jamie George
LP	1	Ellis Genge	(substituted off) 60'
Replacements:
HK	16	Theo Dan
PR	17	Joe Marler	(substituted on) 60'
PR	18	Kyle Sinckler	(substituted on) 60'
LK	19	George Martin	(substituted on) 70'
N8	20	Billy Vunipola	(substituted on) 74'
SH	21	Danny Care	(substituted on) 60'
FH	22	George Ford
CE	23	Ollie Lawrence	(substituted on) 23'	(substituted off) 36'	(substituted on) 65'
Coach:
(England) Steve Borthwick

FB	15	Ilaisa Droasese
RW	14	Vinaya Habosi	(yellow card) 22'	(substituted off) 46'
OC	13	Waisea Nayacalevu (c)
IC	12	Josua Tuisova		(substituted off) 72'
LW	11	Semi Radradra
FH	10	Vilimoni Botitu
SH	9	Frank Lomani		(substituted off) 56'
N8	8	Viliame Mata
OF	7	Levani Botia
BF	6	Lekima Tagitagivalu		(substituted off) 56'
RL	5	Albert Tuisue		(substituted off) 76'
LL	4	Isoa Nasilasila
TP	3	Luke Tagi		(substituted off) 23'
HK	2	Tevita Ikanivere		(substituted off) 49'
LP	1	Eroni Mawi		(substituted off) 49'
Replacements:
HK	16	Sam Matavesi		(substituted on) 49'
PR	17	Peni Ravai		(substituted on) 49'
PR	18	Mesake Doge		(substituted on) 23'
FL	19	Meli Derenalagi		(substituted on) 56'
FL	20	Vilive Miramira		(substituted on) 76'
SH	21	Simione Kuruvoli		(substituted on) 56'
CE	22	Iosefo Masi		(substituted on) 72'
FB	23	Sireli Maqala		(substituted on) 46'
Coach:
(Fiji) Simon Raiwalui

Player of the Match:
Owen Farrell (England)

Assistant referees:
Nic Berry (Australia)
Pierre Brousset (France)
Television match official:
Ben Whitehouse (Wales)

=== France vs South Africa ===
15 October 2023
21:00 CEST (UTC+2)

France	28–29	South Africa
Try: Baille (2) 4' c, 31' c Mauvaka 22' m Con: Ramos (2/3) 5', 32'; Pen: Ramos (3/4) 40+1', 54', 73'	Report	Try: Arendse 8' c De Allende 18' m Kolbe 27' c Etzebeth 67' c Con: Libbok (2/3) 10', 28'; Pollard (1/1) 67'; Pen: Pollard (1/1) 69'

Stade de France, Saint-Denis
Attendance: 79,486
Referee: Ben O'Keeffe (New Zealand)

France	South Africa

FB	15	Thomas Ramos
RW	14	Damian Penaud
OC	13	Gaël Fickou
IC	12	Jonathan Danty
LW	11	Louis Bielle-Biarrey
FH	10	Matthieu Jalibert	(substituted off) 73'
SH	9	Antoine Dupont (c)
N8	8	Grégory Alldritt	(substituted off) 69'
OF	7	Charles Ollivon
BF	6	Anthony Jelonch	(substituted off) 51'
RL	5	Thibaud Flament	(substituted off) 50'
LL	4	Cameron Woki
TP	3	Uini Atonio	(substituted off) 58'
HK	2	Peato Mauvaka	(substituted off) 64'
LP	1	Cyril Baille	(substituted off) 50'
Replacements:
HK	16	Pierre Bourgarit	(substituted on) 64'
PR	17	Reda Wardi	(substituted on) 50'
PR	18	Dorian Aldegheri	(substituted on) 58'
LK	19	Romain Taofifénua	(substituted on) 50'
FL	20	François Cros	(substituted on) 51'
FL	21	Sekou Macalou	(substituted on) 69'
SH	22	Maxime Lucu
CE	23	Yoram Moefana	(substituted on) 73'
Coach:
(France) Fabien Galthié

FB	15	Damian Willemse		(substituted off) 51'
RW	14	Kurt-Lee Arendse
OC	13	Jesse Kriel
IC	12	Damian de Allende
LW	11	Cheslin Kolbe
FH	10	Manie Libbok		(substituted off) 45'
SH	9	Cobus Reinach		(substituted off) 45'
N8	8	Duane Vermeulen		(substituted off) 51'	(substituted on) 61'
BF	7	Pieter-Steph du Toit			(substituted off) 61'	(substituted on) 75'
OF	6	Siya Kolisi (c)		(substituted off) 46'
RL	5	Franco Mostert		(substituted off) 45'
LL	4	Eben Etzebeth	(yellow card) 40'
TP	3	Frans Malherbe		(substituted off) 63'
HK	2	Bongi Mbonambi				(substituted off) 75'
LP	1	Steven Kitshoff		(substituted off) 51'
Replacements:
HK	16	Deon Fourie		(substituted on) 46'
PR	17	Ox Nché		(substituted on) 51'
PR	18	Vincent Koch		(substituted on) 63'
LK	19	RG Snyman		(substituted on) 45'
FL	20	Kwagga Smith		(substituted on) 51'
SH	21	Faf de Klerk		(substituted on) 45'
FH	22	Handré Pollard		(substituted on) 45'
FB	23	Willie le Roux		(substituted on) 51'
Coach:
(South Africa) Jacques Nienaber

Player of the Match:
Bongi Mbonambi (South Africa)

Assistant referees:
Paul Williams (New Zealand)
James Doleman (New Zealand)
Television match official:
Brendon Pickerill (New Zealand)

== Semi-finals ==
=== Argentina vs New Zealand ===
20 October 2023
21:00 CEST (UTC+2)

Argentina	6–44	New Zealand
Pen: Boffelli (2/2) 5', 35'	Report	Try: Jordan (3) 11' c, 62' m, 73' m J. Barrett 17' m Frizell (2) 40+2' m, 49' c Smith 42' c Con: Mo'unga (3/7) 12', 43', 50'; Pen: Mo'unga (1/1) 38'

Stade de France, Saint-Denis
Attendance: 77,653
Referee: Angus Gardner (Australia)

Argentina	New Zealand

FB	15	Juan Cruz Mallía
RW	14	Emiliano Boffelli
OC	13	Lucio Cinti
IC	12	Santiago Chocobares	(substituted off) 63'
LW	11	Mateo Carreras
FH	10	Santiago Carreras	(substituted off) 66'
SH	9	Gonzalo Bertranou	(substituted off) 50'
N8	8	Facundo Isa	18' to 31'		(substituted off) 63'
OF	7	Marcos Kremer
BF	6	Juan Martín González
RL	5	Tomás Lavanini	(substituted off) 41'
LL	4	Guido Petti
TP	3	Francisco Gómez Kodela	(substituted off) 50'
HK	2	Julián Montoya (c)	(substituted off) 63'
LP	1	Thomas Gallo	(substituted off) 66'
Replacements:
HK	16	Agustín Creevy	(substituted on) 63'
PR	17	Joel Sclavi	(substituted on) 66'
PR	18	Eduardo Bello	(substituted on) 50'
LK	19	Matías Alemanno	(substituted on) 41'
N8	20	Rodrigo Bruni	(substituted on) 18'	(substituted off) 31'	(substituted on) 63'
SH	21	Lautaro Bazán	(substituted on) 50'
FH	22	Nicolás Sánchez	(substituted on) 66'
CE	23	Matías Moroni	(substituted on) 63'
Coach:
(Australia) Michael Cheika

FB	15	Beauden Barrett		(substituted off) 56'
RW	14	Will Jordan
OC	13	Rieko Ioane		(substituted off) 61'
IC	12	Jordie Barrett
LW	11	Mark Tele'a
FH	10	Richie Mo'unga
SH	9	Aaron Smith		(substituted off) 56'
N8	8	Ardie Savea
OF	7	Sam Cane (c)		(substituted off) 66'
BF	6	Shannon Frizell
RL	5	Scott Barrett	(yellow card) 66'
LL	4	Sam Whitelock		(substituted off) 61'
TP	3	Tyrel Lomax		(substituted off) 56'
HK	2	Codie Taylor		(substituted off) 50'
LP	1	Ethan de Groot		(substituted off) 56'
Replacements:
HK	16	Samisoni Taukei'aho		(substituted on) 50'
PR	17	Tamaiti Williams		(substituted on) 56'
PR	18	Fletcher Newell		(substituted on) 56'
LK	19	Brodie Retallick		(substituted on) 61'
FL	20	Dalton Papalii		(substituted on) 66'
SH	21	Finlay Christie		(substituted on) 56'
FB	22	Damian McKenzie		(substituted on) 56'
CE	23	Anton Lienert-Brown		(substituted on) 61'
Coach:
(New Zealand) Ian Foster

Player of the Match:
Jordie Barrett (New Zealand)

Assistant referees:
Nic Berry (Australia)
Karl Dickson (England)
Television match official:
Ben Whitehouse (Wales)

Notes:

- With this victory, New Zealand advanced to a fifth World Cup final – a new record for final appearances at the tournament.
- Facundo Isa (Argentina) earned his 50th test cap.
- Will Jordan (New Zealand) equalled the World Cup record of 8 tries scored at a single tournament (shared with Bryan Habana, Jonah Lomu and Julian Savea).
- After receiving a yellow card in the 66th minute, Scott Barrett did not return to the field, despite the sin bin period elapsing with 4 minutes still remaining on the clock. This meant that New Zealand finished the match with 14 players.

=== England vs South Africa ===
21 October 2023
21:00 CEST (UTC+2)

England	15–16	South Africa
Pen: Farrell (4/4) 3', 10', 24', 39'; Drop: Farrell (1/1) 53'	Report	Try: Snyman 69' c Con: Pollard (1/1) 70'; Pen: Libbok (1/1) 21'; Pollard (2/2) 35', 78'

Stade de France, Saint-Denis
Attendance: 78,098
Referee: Ben O'Keeffe (New Zealand)

England	South Africa

FB	15	Freddie Steward
RW	14	Jonny May	(substituted off) 78'
OC	13	Joe Marchant
IC	12	Manu Tuilagi	(substituted off) 74'
LW	11	Elliot Daly
FH	10	Owen Farrell (c)
SH	9	Alex Mitchell	(substituted off) 53'
N8	8	Ben Earl
OF	7	Tom Curry	33' to 39'		(substituted off) 69'
BF	6	Courtney Lawes
RL	5	George Martin	(substituted off) 53'
LL	4	Maro Itoje
TP	3	Dan Cole	(substituted off) 56'
HK	2	Jamie George
LP	1	Joe Marler	(substituted off) 53'
Replacements:
HK	16	Theo Dan
PR	17	Ellis Genge	(substituted on) 53'
PR	18	Kyle Sinckler	(substituted on) 56'
LK	19	Ollie Chessum	(substituted on) 53'
N8	20	Billy Vunipola	(substituted on) 33'	(substituted off) 39'	(substituted on) 69'
SH	21	Danny Care	(substituted on) 53'
FH	22	George Ford	(substituted on) 78'
CE	23	Ollie Lawrence	(substituted on) 74'
Coach:
(England) Steve Borthwick

FB	15	Damian Willemse	(substituted off) 44'
RW	14	Kurt-Lee Arendse
OC	13	Jesse Kriel
IC	12	Damian de Allende
LW	11	Cheslin Kolbe
FH	10	Manie Libbok	(substituted off) 31'
SH	9	Cobus Reinach	(substituted off) 43'
N8	8	Duane Vermeulen	(substituted off) 51'
BF	7	Pieter-Steph du Toit
OF	6	Siya Kolisi (c)	(substituted off) 51'
RL	5	Franco Mostert
LL	4	Eben Etzebeth	(substituted off) 46'
TP	3	Frans Malherbe	(substituted off) 56'
HK	2	Bongi Mbonambi
LP	1	Steven Kitshoff	(substituted off) 49'
Replacements:
HK	16	Deon Fourie	(substituted on) 51'
PR	17	Ox Nché	(substituted on) 49'
PR	18	Vincent Koch	(substituted on) 56'
LK	19	RG Snyman	(substituted on) 46'
FL	20	Kwagga Smith	(substituted on) 51'
SH	21	Faf de Klerk	(substituted on) 43'
FH	22	Handré Pollard	(substituted on) 31'
FB	23	Willie le Roux	(substituted on) 44'
Coach:
(South Africa) Jacques Nienaber

Player of the Match:
Handré Pollard (South Africa)

Assistant referees:
Mathieu Raynal (France)
Paul Williams (New Zealand)
Television match official:
Brendon Pickerill (New Zealand)

Notes:

- Owen Farrell became the second highest all-time points scorer in test rugby (including points scored for both England and the British & Irish Lions), surpassing Jonny Wilkinson (1,246) and moving behind top scorer Dan Carter (1,598).

== Bronze final: Argentina vs England ==
27 October 2023
21:00 CEST (UTC+2)

Argentina	23–26	England
Try: Cubelli 36' c S. Carreras 42' c Con: Boffelli (2/2) 37', 43'; Pen: Boffelli (2/2) 24', 50'; Sánchez (1/2) 68'	Report	Try: Earl 8' c Dan 44' c Con: Farrell (2/2) 9', 45'; Pen: Farrell (4/4) 3', 13', 30', 65'

Stade de France, Saint-Denis
Attendance: 77,674
Referee: Nic Berry (Australia)

Argentina	England

FB	15	Juan Cruz Mallía
RW	14	Emiliano Boffelli
OC	13	Lucio Cinti	(substituted off) 47'
IC	12	Jeronimo de la Fuente
LW	11	Mateo Carreras
FH	10	Santiago Carreras	(substituted off) 56'
SH	9	Tomás Cubelli	(substituted off) 51'
N8	8	Facundo Isa	(substituted off) 47'
OF	7	Marcos Kremer
BF	6	Juan Martín González
RL	5	Pedro Rubiolo	(substituted off) 66'
LL	4	Guido Petti
TP	3	Francisco Gómez Kodela	(substituted off) 60'
HK	2	Julian Montoya (c)	(substituted off) 56'
LP	1	Thomas Gallo	(substituted off) 66'
Replacements:
HK	16	Agustín Creevy	(substituted on) 56'
PR	17	Joel Sclavi	(substituted on) 66'
PR	18	Eduardo Bello	(substituted on) 60'
LK	19	Matías Alemanno	(substituted on) 66'
N8	20	Rodrigo Bruni	(substituted on) 47'
SH	21	Lautaro Bazán	(substituted on) 51'
FH	22	Nicolás Sánchez	(substituted on) 56'
CE	23	Matías Moroni	(substituted on) 47'
Coach:
(Australia) Michael Cheika

FB	15	Marcus Smith
RW	14	Freddie Steward
OC	13	Joe Marchant
IC	12	Manu Tuilagi	(substituted off) 56'
LW	11	Henry Arundell	(substituted off) 66'
FH	10	Owen Farrell (c)
SH	9	Ben Youngs	(substituted off) 51'
N8	8	Ben Earl
OF	7	Sam Underhill
BF	6	Tom Curry	(substituted off) 50'
RL	5	Ollie Chessum	(substituted off) 70'
LL	4	Maro Itoje
TP	3	Will Stuart	(substituted off) 50'
HK	2	Theo Dan	(substituted off) 54'
LP	1	Ellis Genge	(substituted off) 50'
Replacements:
HK	16	Jamie George	(substituted on) 54'
PR	17	Bevan Rodd	(substituted on) 50'
PR	18	Dan Cole	(substituted on) 50'
LK	19	David Ribbans	(substituted on) 70'
FL	20	Lewis Ludlam	(substituted on) 50'
SH	21	Danny Care	(substituted on) 51'
FH	22	George Ford	(substituted on) 56'
CE	23	Ollie Lawrence	(substituted on) 66'
Coach:
(England) Steve Borthwick

Player of the Match:
Sam Underhill (England)

Assistant referees:
Nika Amashukeli (Georgia)
Andrew Brace (Ireland)
Television match official:
Ben Whitehouse (Wales)

Notes:

- England finished as bronze medallists for the first time in World Cup history.
- Tom Curry (England) earned his 50th test cap.
- The crowd of 77,674 was the biggest ever crowd for a Rugby World Cup third-place play-off/bronze final, surpassing the previous record of 62,712 set at the 2003 Rugby World Cup.

== Final: New Zealand vs South Africa ==
28 October 2023
21:00 CEST (UTC+2)

New Zealand	11–12	South Africa
Try: B. Barrett 58' m Pen: Mo'unga (2/2) 17', 38'	Report	Pen: Pollard (4/4) 3', 13', 19', 34'

Stade de France, Saint-Denis
Attendance: 80,065
Referee: Wayne Barnes (England)

New Zealand	South Africa

FB	15	Beauden Barrett
RW	14	Will Jordan		(substituted off) 71'
OC	13	Rieko Ioane
IC	12	Jordie Barrett
LW	11	Mark Tele'a
FH	10	Richie Mo'unga		(substituted off) 75'
SH	9	Aaron Smith		(substituted off) 66'
N8	8	Ardie Savea
OF	7	Sam Cane (c)	(red card) 27'
BF	6	Shannon Frizell	(yellow card) 2'	(substituted off) 55'
RL	5	Scott Barrett
LL	4	Brodie Retallick		(substituted off) 71'
TP	3	Tyrel Lomax		(substituted off) 66'
HK	2	Codie Taylor		(substituted off) 66'
LP	1	Ethan de Groot		(substituted off) 66'
Replacements:
HK	16	Samisoni Taukei'aho		(substituted on) 66'
PR	17	Tamaiti Williams		(substituted on) 66'
PR	18	Nepo Laulala		(substituted on) 66'
LK	19	Sam Whitelock		(substituted on) 55'
FL	20	Dalton Papalii		(substituted on) 71'
SH	21	Finlay Christie		(substituted on) 66'
FB	22	Damian McKenzie		(substituted on) 75'
CE	23	Anton Lienert-Brown		(substituted on) 71'
Coach:
(New Zealand) Ian Foster

FB	15	Damian Willemse		(substituted off) 66'
RW	14	Kurt-Lee Arendse
OC	13	Jesse Kriel
IC	12	Damian de Allende
LW	11	Cheslin Kolbe	(yellow card) 73'
FH	10	Handré Pollard
SH	9	Faf de Klerk
N8	8	Duane Vermeulen		(substituted off) 58'
BF	7	Pieter-Steph du Toit
OF	6	Siya Kolisi (c)	(yellow card) 45'	(substituted off) 73'
RL	5	Franco Mostert		(substituted off) 52'
LL	4	Eben Etzebeth		(substituted off) 58'
TP	3	Frans Malherbe		(substituted off) 66'
HK	2	Bongi Mbonambi		(substituted off) 4'
LP	1	Steven Kitshoff		(substituted off) 52'
Replacements:
HK	16	Deon Fourie		(substituted on) 4'
PR	17	Ox Nché		(substituted on) 52'
PR	18	Trevor Nyakane		(substituted on) 66'
LK	19	Jean Kleyn		(substituted on) 58'
LK	20	RG Snyman		(substituted on) 52'
FL	21	Kwagga Smith		(substituted on) 58'
N8	22	Jasper Wiese		(substituted on) 73'
FB	23	Willie le Roux		(substituted on) 66'
Coach:
(South Africa) Jacques Nienaber

Player of the Match:
Pieter-Steph du Toit (South Africa)

Assistant referees:
Karl Dickson (England)
Matthew Carley (England)
Television match official:
Tom Foley (England)

Notes:

- South Africa became the first team to win a fourth World Cup title.
- South Africa became the first team to win successive World Cup titles away from home.
- South Africa became the second team (after New Zealand in 2015) to retain the World Cup.
- This was the third time that the World Cup final winner earned their victory without scoring a try – a feat previously achieved by South Africa in 1995 and 2007.
- Sam Cane (New Zealand) became the first player to receive a red card in a World Cup final.
- The four cards issued in the match (one red and three yellows) set a new record for most cards issued in a World Cup final. There had been just one card issued across the previous nine finals – a yellow card against New Zealand's Ben Smith in 2015.
- This was the first World Cup final in which both finalists had lost a match during the pool stages.
- This was the first World Cup final in which all four match officials were appointed from the same union (England).
- Brothers Beauden Barrett, Jordie Barrett and Scott Barrett all started for New Zealand – the first time that three siblings played in a World Cup final.
- Beauden Barrett (New Zealand) became the first player to score a try in 2 separate Rugby World Cup finals, having scored a try in the 2015 RWC Final and another try in the 2023 RWC Final.
