= 2021 Argentina rugby union tours of Europe =

- Date: 3–17 July
- Coach: (Argentina) Mario Ledesma
- Tour captain: Juan Montoya
- Top point scorer: Nicolás Sánchez
- Top try scorer: Pablo Matera (2)
Summary
P	W	D	L
Total
Test match
3	2	1	0
Opponent
P	W	D	L
Romania
1	1	0	0
Wales
2	1	1	0

2021 Argentina rugby union tours of Europe
- Date: 6–21 November
- Coach: (Argentina) Mario Ledesma
- Tour captain: Juan Montoya
Summary
P	W	D	L
Test match
3	1	0	2
France
1	0	0	1
Italy
1	1	0	0
Ireland
1	0	0	1

The 2021 Argentina rugby union tours of Europe were two tours by the Argentina national team on Europe that included a series of matches played in the continent. The first tour was in July, 2021, and was composed of three matches in Romania and Wales, as preparation for the 2021 Rugby Championship. Argentina played one match v Romania and two v Wales national teams.

The second tour started in November, 2021, after the Pumas concluded their participation in the Rugby Championship with no successful results (having lost the six matches played). The squad visited France, Italy, and Ireland to play a series of test matches in those countries. The tests v France and Italy had been scheduled for July 2020 but were postponed due to the COVID-19 pandemic.

== Touring party ==
Players that were called up for both tours, were: Matías Alemanno, Gonzalo Bertranou, Emiliano Boffelli, Facundo Bosch, Rodrigo Bruni, Santiago Carreras, Santiago Chocobares, Santiago Cordero, Tomás Cubelli, Jerónimo De la Fuente, Bautista Delguy, Felipe Ezcurra, Facundo Gigena, Francisco Gorrisen, Francisco Gómez Kodela, Juan Imhoff, Facundo Isa, Marcos Kremer, Tomás Lavanini, Tomás Lezana, Pablo Matera, Santiago Medrano, Domingo Miotti, Julián Montoya (captain), Matías Moroni, Matías Orlando, Guido Petti, Enrique Pieretto, Nicolás Sánchez, Santiago Socino, Nahuel Tetaz Chaparro, and Federico Wgrzyn.

For the tour of November, Santiago Grondona, Tomás Cubelli and Facundo Isa returned to the team, apart from the addition of youth players Facundo Cordero and Ignacio Ruiz, which made their debuts with Los Pumas. Players selected that were not part of the first tour were Eduardo Bello, Mateo Carreras, Lucio Cinti, Facundo Cordero, Thomas Gallo, Gonzalo García, Juan Martín González, Santiago Grondona, Juan Cruz Mallía, Lucas Mensa, and Ignacio Ruiz.

On the other hand, Agustín Creevy, Juan Imhoff, and Benjamín Urdapilleta were left behind for the tour.

== First tour ==
=== Match summary ===
Date	Rival	Res.	Score	Venue	City	Ref.
3 Jul	Romania	won	24–17	Stadionul Arcul de Triumf	Bucharest	
10 Jul	Wales	draw	20–20	Millennium Stadium	Cardiff	
17 Jul	Wales	won	33–11	Millennium Stadium	Cardiff	

=== Match details ===
3 Jul

Romania	17–24	Argentina
Try: Căpățînă; Pen: Melinte (4)	Report	Try: Bruni, Cordero, González; Con: Miotti

Stadionul Arcul de Triumf, Bucharest

Team details

Romania
Argentina

FB	15	Ionel Melinte
W	14	Ionuț Dumitru
B	13	Taylor Gontineac
B	12	Alexandru Bucur
W	11	Nicolas Onuțu
FH	10	Daniel Plai
SH	9	Gabriel Rupanu
N8	8	Andre Gorin
FL	7	Cristi Boboc
FL	6	Cristi Chirică
L	5	Adrian Moțoc
L	4	Florian Roșu
P	3	Alexandru Țăruș
H	2	Eugen Căpățână
P	1	Alexandru Savin
Head Coach:
(England) Andy Robinson

FB	15	Santiago Cordero
W	14	Bautista Delguy
B	13	Matias Moroni
B	12	Jerónimo de la Fuente
W	11	Juan Imhoff
FH	10	Nicolás Sánchez
SH	9	Tomás Cubelli
N8	8	Rodrigo Bruni
FL	7	Francisco Gorrissen
FL	6	Pablo Matera
L	5	Tomás Lavanini
L	4	Marcos Kremer
P	3	Enrique Pieretto
H	2	Julián Montoya
P	1	Facundo Gigena
Head Coach:
(Argentina) Mario Ledesma

10 July
1:00 PM

Wales	20–20	Argentina
Try: Rowlands (51'), Williams (71'); Con: Evans (52', 72'); Pen: Sheedy (18', 27')	Report	Try: Matera (39'), De la Fuente (46'); Con: Sánchez (41', 47'); Pen: Sánchez (16', 35')

Millennium Stadium, Cardiff

Team details

Wales
Argentina

FB	15	Hallam Amos
W	14	Jonah Holmes
B	13	Willis Halaholo
B	12	Jonathan Davies
W	11	Owen Lane
FH	10	Callum Sheedy
SH	9	Kieran Hardy
N8	8	Aaron Wainwright
FL	7	James Botham
FL	6	Josh Turnbull
L	5	Will Rowlands
L	4	Ben Carter
P	3	Dillon Lewis (yellow card)
H	2	Elliot Dee
P	1	Nicky Smith
Head Coach:
(New Zealand) Wayne Pivac

FB	15	Juan Cruz Mallia (red card)
W	14	Santiago Carreras
B	13	Matias Moroni
B	12	Jerónimo de la Fuente
W	11	Santiago Cordero
FH	10	Nicolás Sánchez
SH	9	Tomás Cubelli
N8	8	Rodrigo Bruni
FL	7	Facundo Isa
FL	6	Pablo Matera
L	5	Marcos Kremer
L	4	Guido Petti
P	3	Francisco Gómez Kodela
H	2	Julián Montoya
P	1	Nahuel Tetaz Chaparro (yellow card)
Head Coach:
(Argentina) Mario Ledesma

17 July
3:00 PM

Wales	11–33	Argentina
Try: Lane (8'); Pen: Evans (31', 51')	Report	Try: Moroni (11'), Cubelli (78'), Matera (79'); Con: Sánchez (12', 29', 80'); Pen: Sánchez (26', 57', 65', 76')

Millennium Stadium, Cardiff

Team details

Wales
Argentina

FB	15	Hallam Amos
W	14	Owen Lane
B	13	Nick Tompkins
B	12	Jonathan Davies
W	11	Tom Rogers
FH	10	Jarrod Evans
SH	9	Tomos Williams
N8	8	Ross Moriarty
FL	7	James Botham
FL	6	Josh Turnbull
L	5	Will Rowlands
L	4	Ben Carter
P	3	Leon Brown
H	2	Elliot Dee
P	1	Gareth Thomas
Head Coach:
(New Zealand) Wayne Pivac

FB	15	Santiago Carreras
W	14	Bautista Delguy
B	13	Santiago Chocobares
B	12	Jerónimo de la Fuente
W	11	Matias Moroni
FH	10	Nicolás Sánchez
SH	9	Tomás Cubelli
N8	8	Rodrigo Bruni
FL	7	Facundo Isa
FL	6	Pablo Matera
L	5	Marcos Kremer
L	4	Guido Petti
P	3	Francisco Gómez Kodela
H	2	Julián Montoya
P	1	Nahuel Tetaz Chaparro
Head Coach:
(Argentina) Mario Ledesma

== Second tour ==
=== Match summary ===
Date	Rival	Res.	Score	Venue	City	Ref.
6 Nov	France	lost	20–29	Stade de France	Paris	
13 Nov	Italy	won	37–16	Stadio Comunale di Monigo	Treviso	
21 Nov	Ireland	lost	7–53	Aviva Stadium	Dublin	

=== Match details ===
6 November
5:00 PM

France	29–20	Argentina
Try: Flament (50'), Mauvaka (71'); Con: Jaminet (51', 72'); Pen: Jaminet (3', 19', 35', 65', 80')	Report	Try: Cubelli (22'), Carreras (78'); Con: Boffelli (23'), Sánchez (78'); Pen: Boffelli (48', 60')

Stade de France, Paris

Team details

France
Argentina

FB	15	Melvyn Jaminet
W	14	Damian Penaud
B	13	Gael Fickou
B	12	Romain Ntamack
W	11	Gabin Villière
FH	10	Matthieu Jalibert
SH	9	Antoine Dupont
N8	8	Anthony Jelonch
FL	7	Cameron Woki
FL	6	François Cros
L	5	Paul Willemse
L	4	Thibaud Flament
P	3	Mohamed Haouas
H	2	Julien Marchand	Yellow card
P	1	Cyril Baille
Head Coach:
(France) Fabien Galthié

FB	15	Emiliano Boffelli
W	14	Bautista Delguy
B	13	Matias Moroni
B	12	Jerónimo de la Fuente
W	11	Mateo Carreras
FH	10	Santiago Carreras
SH	9	Tomás Cubelli
N8	8	Facundo Isa
FL	7	Marcos Kremer (yellow card)
FL	6	Pablo Matera
L	5	Tomás Lavanini
L	4	Guido Petti
P	3	Francisco Gómez Kodela
H	2	Julián Montoya
P	1	Thomas Gallo
Manager:
(Argentina) Mario Ledesma

13 November
10:00 AM

Italy	16–37	Argentina
Try: Varney (47'); Con: Garbisi (49'); Pen: Garbisi (32', 42', 51')	Report	Try: Kremer (9'), González (28'), Moroni (42'), Cordero (55'), Bosch (76'); Con: Boffelli (10', 30', 43'); Pen: Boffelli (15'), Sánchez (64')

Stadio Comunale, Treviso

Team details

Italy
Argentina

FB	15	Matteo Minozzi
W	14	Edoardo Padovani
B	13	Juan Ignacio Brex
B	12	Luca Morisi
W	11	Monty Ioane
FH	10	Paolo Garbisi
SH	9	Stephen Varney
N8	8	Giovanni Licata
FL	7	Michele Lamaro
FL	6	Sebastian Negri
L	5	David Sisi
L	4	Giovanni Licata
P	3	Marco Riccioni
H	2	Gianmarco Lucchesi
P	1	Ivan Nemer
Head Coach:
(New Zealand) Kieran Crowley

FB	15	Emiliano Boffelli
W	14	Santiago Cordero
B	13	Matias Moroni
B	12	Jerónimo de la Fuente
W	11	Monty Ioane
FH	10	Santiago Carreras
SH	9	Tomás Cubelli
N8	8	Facundo Isa
FL	7	Juan Martín González
FL	6	Pablo Matera
L	5	Tomás Lavanini
L	4	Marcos Kremer
P	3	Francisco Gómez Kodela
H	2	Julián Montoya
P	1	Thomas Gallo
Manager:
(Argentina) Mario Ledesma

21 November

Ireland	53–7	Argentina
Try: Porter (23'), Doris (36'), van der Flier (56'), Sheehan (66'), Healy (73'), Beirne (75'); Con: Carbery (23', 36'); Pen: Carbery (19', 48', 56', 66', 73')		Try: Carreras (2'); Con: Boffelli (2')

Aviva Stadium, Dublin
Referee: Matthew Carley (England)

Team details

Ireland
Argentina

FB	15	Hugo Keenan
W	14	Robert Baloucoune
B	13	Garry Ringrose
B	12	Robbie Henshaw
W	11	James Lowe
FH	10	Joey Carbery
SH	9	Conor Murray
N8	8	Josh van der Flier
FL	7	Peter O'Mahony
FL	6	Caelan Doris
L	5	James Ryan (c)
L	4	Iain Henderson
P	3	Tadhg Furlong
H	2	Rónan Kelleher
P	1	Andrew Porter
Head Coach:
(England) Andy Farrell

FB	15	Emiliano Boffelli
W	14	Santiago Cordero
B	13	Matias Moroni
B	12	Jerónimo de la Fuente
W	11	Lucio Cinti
FH	10	Santiago Carreras
SH	9	Tomás Cubelli
N8	8	Marcos Kremer
FL	7	Santiago Grondona
FL	6	Pablo Matera (yellow card)
L	5	Tomás Lavanini (red card)
L	4	Guido Petti
P	3	Francisco Gómez Kodela
H	2	Julián Montoya (c)
P	1	Thomas Gallo
Manager:
(Argentina) Mario Ledesma
