= 2022 Argentina rugby union tour of Great Britain =

- Date: 6–19 November
- Coach: (Australia) Michael Cheika
- Top point scorer: Emiliano Boffelli
Summary
P	W	D	L
Total
3	1	0	2
Test match
3	1	0	2
Opponent
P	W	D	L
England
1	1	0	0
Wales
1	0	0	1
Scotland
1	0	0	1

The 2022 Argentina rugby union tours of Great Britain is the tour by the Argentina national team on the United Kingdom that included a series of matches played in the British Isles. After playing the 10th. edition of The Rugby Championship, Argentina went on a tour to play England, Wales, and Scotland national teams.

In the first test, Argentina beat England 30–29 at Twickenham, achieving their second win in England in Los Pumas' history. The team's win also ended with a tenure of 16 years with no wins over England. Emiliano Boffelli was the key player of the match with 25 points scored.

The second test was played v Wales, who defeated Argentina 20–13 in Cardiff. It was the 22nd match between both sides, with 14 wins for Wales and 6 for Argentina.

Argentina finished the tour with a crushing defeat at the hands of Scotland, which beat them 52–29 at Murrayfield Stadium. Scotland scored 8 tries while Argentina had one player sent off (Marcos Kremer) plus three players were shown yellow cards.

== Background ==
It was Argentina's second tour of 2022 after the 2-test tour of New Zealand as part of the 2022 Rugby Championship, held in August and September. Argentina played six games, with 2 wins and 4 losses. Their tour of New Zealand included a first ever win on New Zealand soil, by a score of 25–18 at Christchurch, which was the second win over the All Blacks and the first as visitor team. Their second test match in against New Zealand however, resulted in a crushing 53–3 defeat.

== Match summary ==
Date	Rival	Result	Score	Venue	City	Ref.
6 Nov	England	won	30–29	Twickenham	London	
12 Nov	Wales	lost	13–20	Millennium	Cardiff	
19 Nov	Scotland	lost	29–52	Murrayfield	Edinburgh	

== Match details ==
=== First test ===
5 Nov 2022

England	29–30	Argentina
Try: Cokanasiga 24' van Poortvliet 55'; Con: Farrell 24', 55'; Pen: Farrell 12', 35', 43', 60', 66'	Report	Try: Boffelli 46'; Carreras 51'; Con: Boffelli 51'; Pen: Boffelli 10', 15', 32', 43', 62', 70'

Twickenham Stadium, London
Referee: Andrew Brace (Scotland)

Team details

England
Argentina

FB	15	Freddie Steward
W	14	Jack Nowell
B	13	Manu Tuilagi
B	12	Owen Farrell (c)
W	11	Joe Cokanasiga
FH	10	Marcus Smith
SH	9	Ben Youngs
N8	8	Billy Vunipola
FL	7	Tom Curry
FL	6	Maro Itoje
L	5	Jonny Hill
L	4	Alex Coles
P	3	Kyle Sinckler
H	2	Luke Cowan-Dickie
P	1	Ellis Genge
Head Coach:
(Australia) Eddie Jones

FB	15	Juan Cruz Mallía
W	14	Mateo Carreras
B	13	Matias Moroni
B	12	Jerónimo de la Fuente
W	11	Emiliano Boffelli
FH	10	Santiago Carreras
SH	9	Gonzalo Bertranou
N8	8	Pablo Matera
FL	7	Marcos Kremer
FL	6	Juan Martín González
L	5	Tomás Lavanini
L	4	Matías Alemanno
P	3	Francisco Gómez Kodela
H	2	Julián Montoya (c)
P	1	Thomas Gallo
Head Coach:
(Australia) Michael Cheika

=== Second test ===
12 Nov 2022

Wales	20–13	Argentina
Try: Faletau 31'; Williams 46'; Con: Anscombe 31', 46', Pen: Anscombe 36'; Priestland 62'	Report	Try: Tetaz Chaparro 68'; Con: Boffelli 68'; Pen: Boffelli 7', 12',

Millennium Stadium, Cardiff
Referee: Ben O'Keeffe (New Zealand)

Team details

Wales
Argentina

FB	15	Louis Rees-Zammit
W	14	Alex Cuthbert
B	13	George North
B	12	Nick Tompkins
W	11	Rio Dyer
FH	10	Gareth Anscombe
SH	9	Tomos Williams
N8	8	Taulupe Faletau
FL	7	Justin Tipuric
FL	6	Dan Lydiate
L	5	Adam Beard
L	4	Will Rowlands	(yellow card) 56'
P	3	Dillon Lewis
H	2	Ken Owens
P	1	Gareth Thomas
Head Coach:
(New Zealand) Wayne Pivac

FB	15	Juan Cruz Mallía
W	14	Mateo Carreras
B	13	Matias Moroni
B	12	Jerónimo de la Fuente
W	11	Emiliano Boffelli
FH	10	Santiago Carreras
SH	9	Gonzalo Bertranou
N8	8	Pablo Matera (c)
FL	7	Marcos Kremer
FL	6	Juan Martín González
L	5	Tomás Lavanini
L	4	Matías Alemanno
P	3	Francisco Gómez Kodela
H	2	Agustín Creevy
P	1	Thomas Gallo
Head Coach:
(Australia) Michael Cheika

=== Third test ===
19 Nov 2022

Scotland	52–29	Argentina
Try: Tuipulotu 10', 54'; Van der Merwe 24'; Graham 27', 41', 78'; Redpath 69'; Hogg 74'; Con: Russell 10', 24', 54', 69', 74', 78'	Report	Try: De la Fuente 15'; Alemanno 36'; Boffelli 51'; Ruiz 80'; Con: Boffelli 36', 51'; Sánchez 80'; Pen: Boffelli 1'

Murrayfield Stadium, Edinburgh
Referee: Karl Dickson (ENG)

Team details

Scotland
Argentina

FB	15	Stuart Hogg
RW	14	Darcy Graham
OC	13	Chris Harris
IC	12	Sione Tuipulotu	(yellow card) 40'
LW	11	Duhan van der Merwe
FH	10	Finn Russell
SH	9	Ali Price
N8	8	Jamie Ritchie (c)	(yellow card) 23'
BF	7	Jack Dempsey
OF	6	Matt Fagerson
RL	5	Grant Gilchrist
LL	4	Jonny Gray
TP	3	Zander Fagerson
HK	2	Fraser Brown
LP	1	Pierre Schoeman
Head Coach:
(Scotland) Gregor Townsend

FB	15	Juan Cruz Mallía
W	14	Bautista Delguy
B	13	Matías Orlando
B	12	Jerónimo de la Fuente
W	11	Emiliano Boffelli
FH	10	Santiago Carreras
SH	9	Gonzalo Bertranou
N8	8	Pablo Matera
FL	7	Marcos Kremer	(red card) 22'
FL	6	Juan Martín González
L	5	Tomás Lavanini	(yellow card) 9'
L	4	Matías Alemanno	(yellow card) 8'
P	3	Eduardo Bello
H	2	Julián Montoya (c)
P	1	Thomas Gallo	(yellow card) 22'
Head Coach:
(Australia) Michael Cheika
