= 1968 Wales rugby union tour of Argentina =

Summary
P	W	D	L
Total
6	3	2	1
Test match
2	0	1	1
Opponent
P	W	D	L
Argentina (Note: Official test match only for Argentine Rugby Union)
2	0	1	1

Tour chronology
- ← 1964 Africa 1969 Oceania →

In 1968, the Wales national rugby union team toured Argentina for a series of rugby union matches against Argentine regional and invitational teams, as well as two matches against the Argentina national team.

== History ==
This was the first Welsh tour in Argentina: before only South Africa, Ireland and France national teams, visited Argentina and South America.

Despite the fact that the Welsh Rugby Union did not consider them as official, the two matches against Argentina national team were deemed test matches for Argentina.

It was a big surprise that the "Pumas" won the series with a victory and a draw.

== Match summary ==
Complete list of matches played by Wales in Argentina:

Test matches

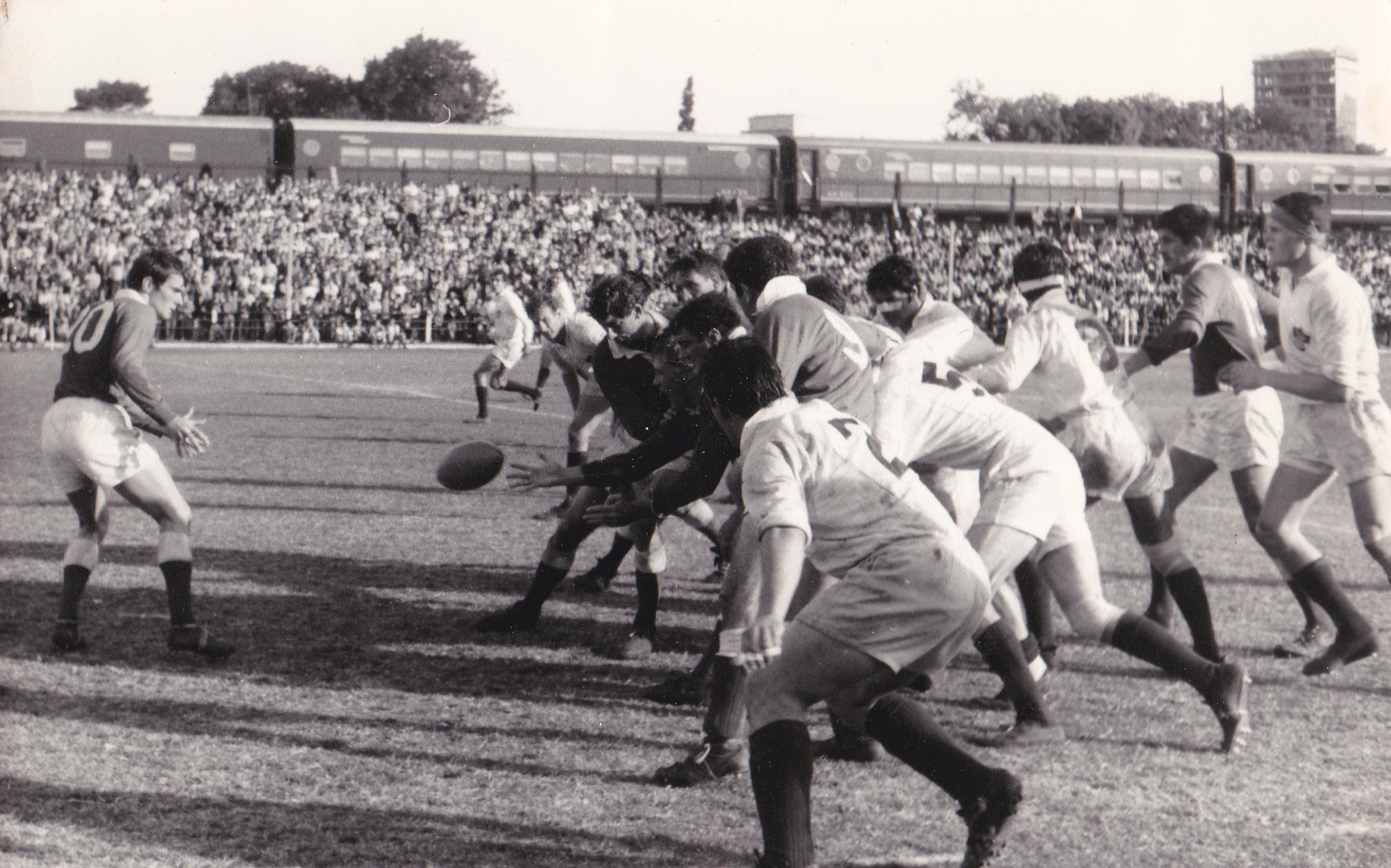
One of the matches played by Wales at Estadio GEBA

Date	Opponent	City	Venue	Score
7 September	Belgrano	Buenos Aires	Estadio G.E.B.A.	24–11
11 September	Seleccionado Interior (Note: Combined team formed by players from different provinces of Argentina)	Buenos Aires	Estadio G.E.B.A.	12–3
14 September	Argentina	Buenos Aires	Estadio G.E.B.A.	5–9
21 September	Argentina B	Buenos Aires	Estadio G.E.B.A.	8–8
25 September	Argentina C (Note: Third Argentine national team)	Buenos Aires	Estadio G.E.B.A.	9–6
28 September	Argentina	Buenos Aires	Estadio G.E.B.A.	9–9

Pld	W	D	L	PF	PA
6	3	2	1	67	46

== Match details ==
7 September 1968

Belgrano	11–24	Wales
Try: Martínez; Con: Rosati; Pen: Rosati (2)		Try: Gray 2, Hughes, Ball, Dawes; Con: Dawes 3 Pen: Dawes

Estadio G.E.B.A., Buenos Aires
Referee: Carlos A. Tozzi (Argentina)

Belgrano: H. Rosati; C. Cornille, C. Martínez, G. Escobar, E. de las Carreras; F. Forrester, L. Gradín; A. Gómez Aparicio, E. Elowson, L. Loyola; M. Cole, L. Tahier; G. Luchetti, F. Gradín (c), E. Verardo
Wales: J. Williams; A. Morgan, J. Dawes (c), G. Ball, L. Daniel; P. Bennett, G. Turner; T. Gray, D. Hughes, D. Morris; L. Baxter, R. Mainwaring; B. Butler, N. Gales, J. Lloyd

11 September 1968

Seleccionado Interior	3–12	Wales
Pen: Seaton		Try: Ferguson, Gray; Butler, Morgan; Con: Ferguson

Estadio G.E.B.A., Buenos Aires
Referee: Eduardo Niño (Argentina)

Seleccionado del Interior: J. Seaton; E. España, R. Taquini, J. Benzi, A. Quetglas; R. Villavicencio, O. Aletta da Silva; J. Imhoff, M. Chesta, J. L. Imhoff (c); M. Campra, H. Suárez; F. Landó, J. Fradua, S. Furno
Wales: J. Williams; S. Ferguson, G. Ball, G. Dawes (c), A. Morgan; R. Phillips, T. Evans, A. John, J. Jeffery, A. Gray; M. Witshire, W. Mainwaring; W. Williams, B. Rees, L. Butler

14 September 1968

Argentina	9–5	Wales
Try: Loyola; Pen: Seaton (2)	Report	Try: Turner; Con: Dawes

Estadio G.E.B.A., Buenos Aires
Referee: Ricardo Colombo (Argentina)

Argentina	Wales

Argentina: 15. Jorge Seaton, 14. Mario Walther, 13. Arturo Rodriguez Jurado, 12. Marcelo Pascual, 11. Alejandro Travaglini, 10. Jorge Dartiguelongue, 9. Adolfo Etchegaray, 8. Hector Silva, 7. Miguel Chesta, 6. Raul Loyola, 5. Aitor Otano, 4. Adrian Anthony, 3. Marcelo Farina, 2. Ricardo Handley, 1. Luis Garcia Yanez
Wales: 15. J. P. R. Williams, 14. Laurie Daniel, 13. Glen Ball, 12. John Dawes, 11. Andy Morgan, 10. Phil Bennett, 9. Glyn Turner, 8. Dennis Hughes, 7. Tony Gray, 6. Dai Morris, 5. Billy Mainwaring, 4. Lyn Baxter, 3. Brian Butler, 2. Brian Rees, 1. John Lloyd

21 September 1968

Argentina B	8–8	Wales
Try: Pére, Travaglini; Con: Gradín		Try: Daniel 2 Con: Daniel

Gimnasia y Esgrima, Buenos Aires
Referee: Bruno Bertelli (Argentina)

Argentina B: D. Morgan; N. Pérez, J. Benzi, R. Villavicencio, A. Travaglini; C. Martínez, L. Gradín (c); G. Plesky, H. Miguens, J. Imhoff; L. Varela, R. Sellarés; R. Casabal, C. Massabó, A. Abella. Wales: J. Williams; L. Daniel, S. Dawes (c), G. Ball, A. Morgan; R. Phillips, G. Turner; A. Gray, D. Hughes, W. Morris, W. Mainwarling, M. Witshire; W. Williams, N. Gale, D. Lloyd

25 September 1968

Argentina C	6–9	Wales
Pen: O'Reilly		Pen: Ferguson, Dawes, Bennett

Estadio G.E.B.A., Buenos Aires
Referee: César De Elizalde (Argentina)

Argentina C: Pagano (c); N. Pérez, E. Reynolds, P. Grossi, J. Fiordalisi; G. Pimentel, A. Gómez Aparicio; J. O'Reilly, E. Elowson, M. Morgan; R. Castro, J. Ferraiuolo; M. Carluccio, E. Toribio, H. Nicola
Wales: J. Williams; S. Ferguson, G. Ball, S. Dawes (c), A. Morgan; P. Bennett, T. Evans; A. John, D. Hughes, J. Jefrey; M. Wilshire, L. Baxter; w. Williams, B. Rees, B. Butler

28 September 1968

Argentina	9–9	Wales
Try: by scrum Pen: Seaton 2	Report	Try: Ferguson; Pen: Ferguson 2

Estadio G.E.B.A., Buenos Aires
Referee: Ken John (England)
Carlos Tozzi (Argentina) from 25'

Argentina	Wales

Argentina: 15. Jorge Seaton, 14. Mario Walther, 13. Arturo Rodriguez Jurado, 12. Marcelo Pascual, 11. Nestor Perez, 10. Jorge Dartiguelongue, 9. Adolfo Etchegaray, 7. Hector Silva (c), 8. Miguel Chesta, 6. Raul Loyola, 5. Aitor Otano, 4. Adrian Anthony, 3. Marcelo Farina, 2. Ricardo Handley, 1. Luis Garcia Yanez
Wales: 15. J. P. R. Williams, 14. Laurie Daniel, 13. Glen Ball, 12. John Dawes (c), 11. Stuart Ferguson, 10. Bob Phillips, 9. Glyn Turner, 8. Dennis Hughes, 7. Tony Gray, 6. Dai Morris, 5. Billy Mainwaring, 4. Max Wiltshire, 3. John Lloyd, 2. Norman Gale, 1. Walter Williams

== See also ==
- History of rugby union matches between Argentina and Wales
