= 1969 Wales rugby union tour of Oceania =

Summary
P	W	D	L
Total
7	4	1	2
Test match
3	1	0	2
Opponent
P	W	D	L
New Zealand
2	0	0	2
Australia
1	1	0	0

Tour chronology
- ← 1968 Argentina 1975 Asia →

The 1969 Wales rugby union tour was a series of rugby union games undertaken by the Wales national rugby union team to Australia, Fiji and New Zealand. The tour took in four matches against regional and invitational teams and three tests; two to New Zealand and one to Australia. This was the second official Wales tour to the southern hemisphere and the first to Australasia and Melanesia.

The tour results were mixed for Wales; the team was unbeaten in the non-test matches and were victorious over Australia, but were completely out-classed by New Zealand. The captaincy of the tour was given to Newport's Brian Price.

== Results ==
27 May 1969

Taranaki	9–9	Wales XV

Rugby Park, New Plymouth

31 May 1969

New Zealand	19–0	Wales

Lancaster Park, Christchurch

4 June 1969

Otago	9–27	Wales XV

Carisbrook, Dunedin

7 June 1969

Wellington	6–14	Wales XV

Athletic Park, Wellington

14 June 1969

New Zealand	33–12	Wales

Eden Park, Auckland

21 June 1969

Australia	16–19	Wales

Sydney Cricket Ground, Sydney

25 June 1969

Fiji	11–31	Wales XV

Suva

== Touring party ==
- Manager: D. J. Phillips

=== Full-backs ===
- J. P. R. Williams (London Welsh)

=== Three-quarters ===
- Gerald Davies (Cardiff)
- Maurice Richards (Cardiff)
- Keith Jarrett (Newport)
- John Dawes (London Welsh)
- Alan Skirving (Newport)
- Stuart Watkins (Newport)

=== Half-backs ===
- Phil Bennett (Llanelli)
- Gareth Edwards (Cardiff)
- Chico Hopkins (Maesteg)
- Barry John (Cardiff)

=== Forwards ===
- Mervyn Davies (London Welsh)
- Norman Gale (Llanelli)
- Dennis Hughes (Newbridge)
- Barry Llewellyn (Newport)
- David Lloyd (Bridgend)
- Dai Morris (Neath)
- Brian Price (Newport) (captain)
- John Taylor (London Welsh)
- Brian Thomas (Neath)
- Delme Thomas (Neath)
- Denzil Williams (Ebbw Vale)
- Jeff Young (Harrogate)

=== Replacements ===
- Vic Perrins (Newport)

== Bibliography ==
- Billot, John (1972). All Blacks in Wales. Ferndale: Ron Jones Publications.
- Smith, David; Williams, Gareth (1980). Fields of Praise: The Official History of The Welsh Rugby Union. Cardiff: University of Wales Press. ISBN 0-7083-0766-3.
