= History of rugby union matches between Argentina and Wales =

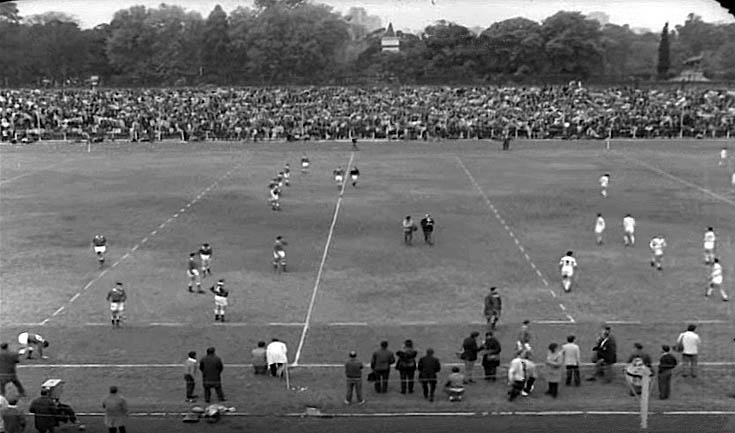
Wales v Argentina on September 28, 1968, in Buenos Aires

In rugby union, the first meeting between Argentina and Wales took place in 1968, when they played two matches as part of a Welsh tour of Argentina; however, only Argentina awarded full caps for the two matches. Argentina won the first match 9–5 and the second was drawn 9–9. They met again in Cardiff in 1976, when Wales won 20–19. The first match for which both teams awarded full caps was in 1991, in the pool stage of the 1991 Rugby World Cup, when Wales won 16–7. Since then, the two teams have met a total of 24 times; Wales hold the upper hand with 14 wins to Argentina's 9, with 1 match drawn. The most recent test between the two sides was Argentina's win over Wales in San Juan, Argentina, 35-21 on the 12th July 2026.

== Summary ==
Note: Summary below reflects test results by both teams.

=== Overview ===
Details	Played	Won by Argentina	Won by Wales	Drawn	Argentina points	Wales points
In Argentina	9	4	5	0	241	264
In Wales	14	4	9	1	304	341
Neutral venue	1	1	0	0	29	17
Overall	24	9	14	1	574	622

=== Records ===
Note: Date shown in brackets indicates when the record was or last set.

Record	Argentina	Wales
Longest winning streak	3 (14 October 2023 to date)	5 (9 October 1991 – 10 November 2001)
Largest points for
Home	50 (12 June 2004)	43 (21 November 1998)
Away	52 (9 November 2025)	44 (12 June 2004)
Largest winning margin
Home	18 (17 June 2006)	34 (16 November 2013)
Away	24 (9 November 2025)	18 (16 June 2018)

== Matches ==
No.	Date	Venue	Score	Winner	Competition	Ref.
1	9 October 1991	National Stadium, Cardiff	16–7	Wales	1991 Rugby World Cup	
2	21 November 1998	Stradey Park, Llanelli	43–30	Wales	1998 Argentina tour of Japan and Europe	
3	5 June 1999	Estadio Ricardo Etcheverry, Buenos Aires	26–36	Wales	1999 Wales tour of Argentina	
4	12 June 1999	Estadio Ricardo Etcheverry, Buenos Aires	16–23	Wales	1999 Wales tour of Argentina	
5	1 October 1999	Millennium Stadium, Cardiff	23–18	Wales	1999 Rugby World Cup	
6	10 November 2001	Millennium Stadium, Cardiff	16–30	Argentina	2001 Argentina tour of New Zealand and Great Britain	
7	12 June 2004	Estadio Monumental José Fierro, Tucumán	50–44	Argentina	2004 Wales tour of Argentina and South Africa	
8	19 June 2004	José Amalfitani Stadium, Buenos Aires	20–35	Wales	2004 Wales tour of Argentina and South Africa	
9	11 June 2006	Estadio Raúl Conti, Puerto Madryn	27–25	Argentina	2006 Wales tour of Argentina	
10	17 June 2006	José Amalfitani Stadium, Buenos Aires	45–27	Argentina	2006 Wales tour of Argentina	
11	18 August 2007	Millennium Stadium, Cardiff	27–20	Wales	2007 Rugby World Cup warm-up match	
12	21 November 2009	Millennium Stadium, Cardiff	33–16	Wales	2009 Autumn International	
13	20 August 2011	Millennium Stadium, Cardiff	28–13	Wales	2011 Rugby World Cup warm-up match	
14	10 November 2012	Millennium Stadium, Cardiff	12–26	Argentina	2012 Autumn International	
15	16 November 2013	Millennium Stadium, Cardiff	40–6	Wales	2013 Autumn International	
16	12 November 2016	Millennium Stadium, Cardiff	24–20	Wales	2016 Autumn International	
17	9 June 2018	Estadio San Juan del Bicentenario, San Juan	10–23	Wales	2018 Wales tour of Argentina and the United States	
18	16 June 2018	Estadio Centenario, Resistencia	12–30	Wales	2018 Wales tour of Argentina and the United States	
19	10 July 2021	Millennium Stadium, Cardiff	20–20	draw	2021 Argentina tour of Romania and Wales	
20	17 July 2021	Millennium Stadium, Cardiff	11–33	Argentina	2021 Argentina tour of Romania and Wales	
21	12 November 2022	Millennium Stadium, Cardiff	20–13	Wales	2022 Argentina tour of Great Britain	
22	14 October 2023	Stade Vélodrome, Marseille (France)	17–29	Argentina	2023 Rugby World Cup	
23	9 November 2025	Millennium Stadium, Cardiff	28–52	Argentina	2025 Autumn International	
24	11 July 2026	Estadio San Juan del Bicentenario, San Juan	35–21	Argentina	2026 Nations Championship	

== XV results ==
Below is a list of matches that Argentina has awarded test match status by virtue of awarding caps, but Wales did not award caps.

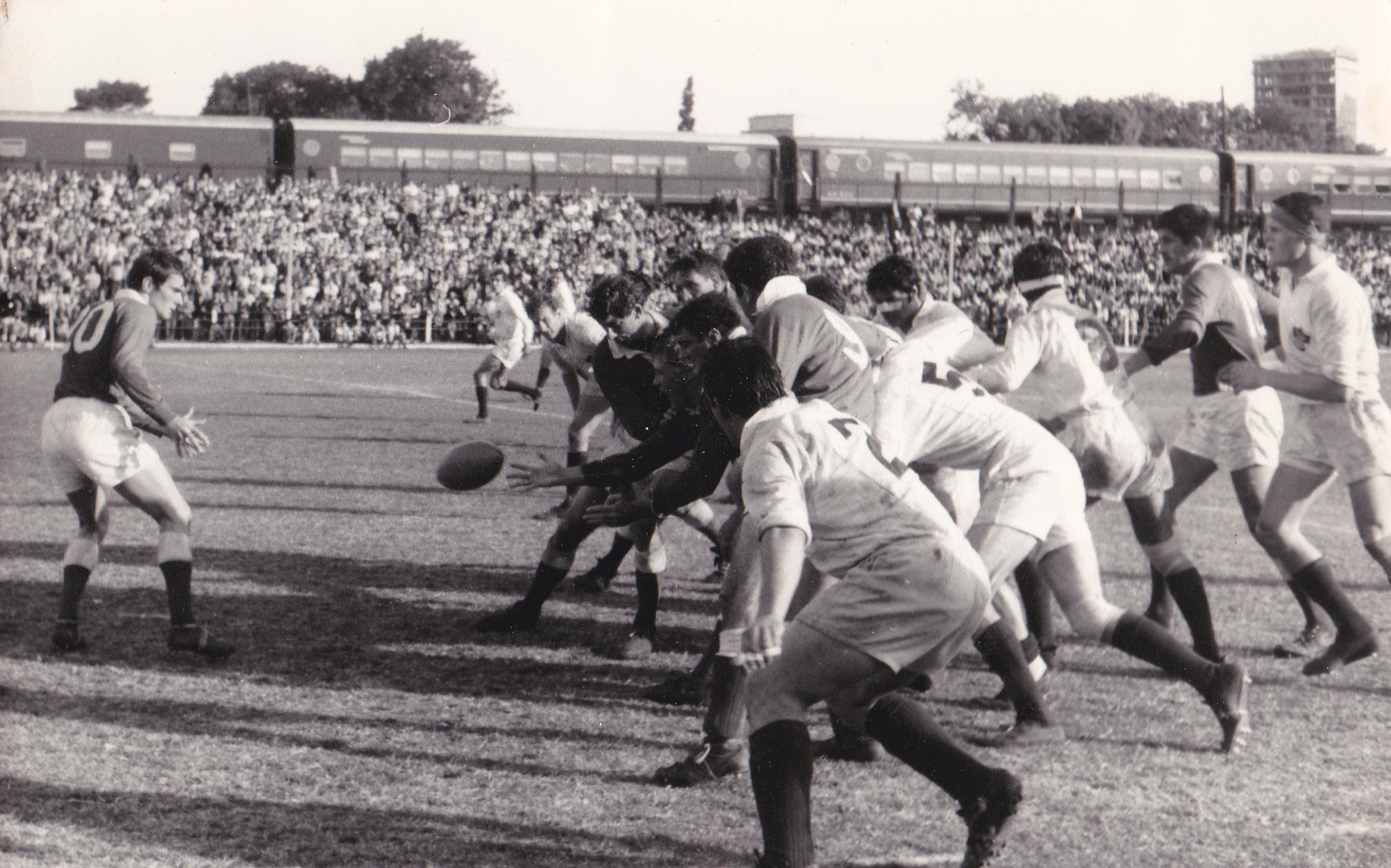
Wales on their 1968 tour of Argentina

Date	Venue	Score	Winner	Competition
14 September 1968	Estadio G.E.B.A., Buenos Aires	9–5	Argentina	1968 Wales tour of Argentina
28 September 1968	Estadio G.E.B.A., Buenos Aires	9–9	draw	1968 Wales tour of Argentina
16 October 1976	National Stadium, Cardiff	20–19	Wales XV	1976 Argentina tour of Great Britain

== List of series ==
Played	Won by Argentina	Won by Wales	Drawn
5	2	2	1

Year	Argentina	Wales	Series winner
1999	0	2	Wales
2004	1	1	draw
2006	2	0	Argentina
2018	0	2	Wales
2021	1	0	Argentina (Note: The first match of the two-test series was a draw, thus Argentina won the series 1–0.)
