= Glyn Turner =

Wales dual-code international rugby footballer

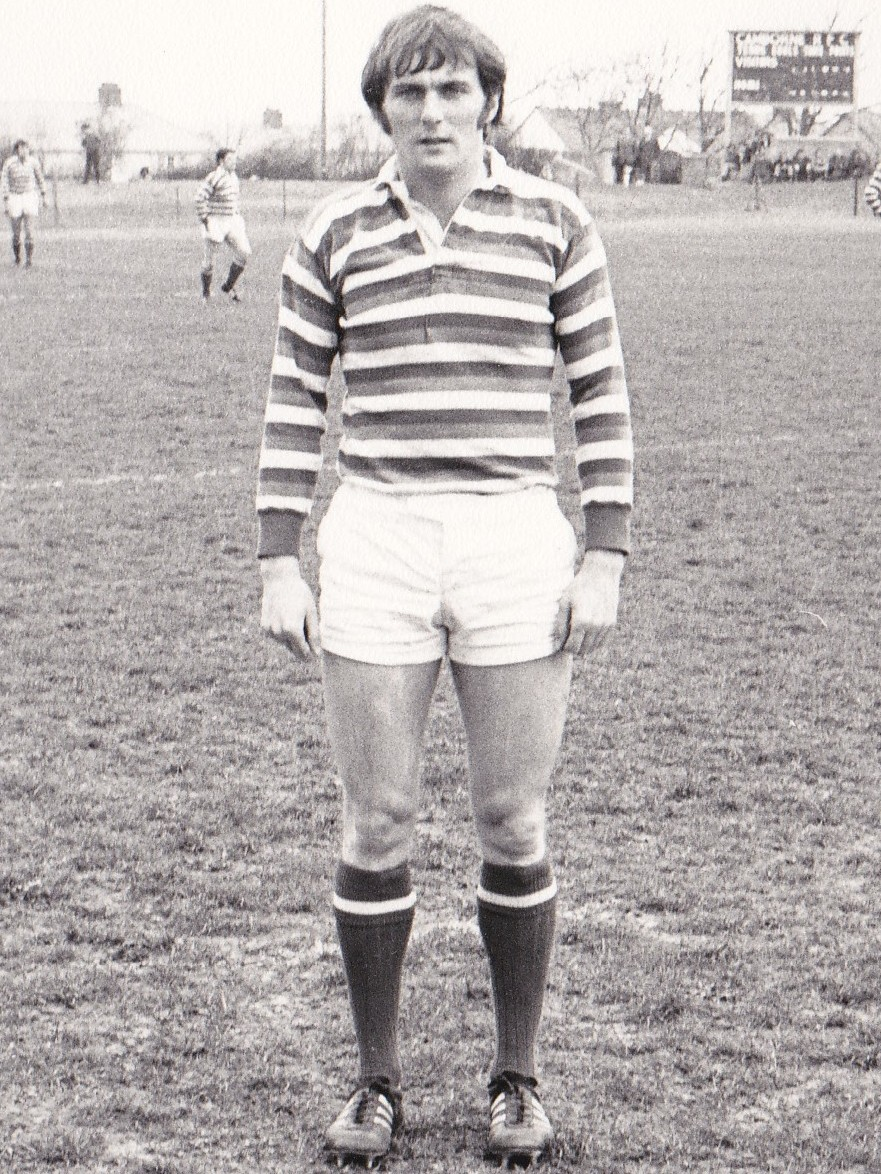

Personal information
- Full name: Glyndwr Robert Turner
- Born: 22 March 1947 (age 78) Nantyglo, Wales
- Weight: 12 st 0 lb (76 kg)

Playing information

Rugby union
- Position: Scrum-half
Club
| Years | Team | Pld | T | G | FG | P |
|---|---|---|---|---|---|---|
| 1966–74 | Ebbw Vale | 350 | 147 | 0 | 0 | 0 |
Representative
| Years | Team | Pld | T | G | FG | P |
| 1968–74 | Wales XV | 2 | 1 | 0 | 0 | 0 |
| 1970–74 | Wales Under 25s | 1 | 0 | 0 | 0 | 0 |
| 1967–74 | Monmouthshire County RFC | 0 | 0 | 0 | 0 | 0 |
| 1967–74 | Gwent County RFC | 0 | 0 | 0 | 0 | 0 |
| 1967–74 | Crawshays RFC | 0 | 0 | 0 | 0 | 0 |

Rugby league
- Position: Centre, Stand-off
Club
| Years | Team | Pld | T | G | FG | P |
|---|---|---|---|---|---|---|
| 1974–78 | Hull Kingston Rovers | 36+14 | 25 | 3 | 0 | 81 |
| 1978–80 | Hull FC | 36 | 18 | 2 | 0 | 0 |
| | Total | 86 | 43 | 5 | 0 | 81 |
Representative
| Years | Team | Pld | T | G | FG | P |
| 1975–78 | Wales | 6 | 0 | 0 | 0 | 0 |

Glyndwr Turner (born 22 March 1947) is a Welsh former rugby union footballer who played scrum-half position for Welsh club side Ebbw Vale RFC between 1966 and 1974 before turning professional to play rugby league in England. On turning professional, Turner signed for Hull Kingston Rovers in 1974 playing for them until 1978, before moving to rivals Hull FC in 1978 where he played until he was forced to retire in 1980 due to injury, as a centre or stand-off.

Glyn represented Wales in both Rugby Union and Rugby League. He also has county representative honours for Monmouthshire County RFC, Gwent County RFC and was selected to represent Crawshays RFC.

== Background ==
Turner was born in Nantyglo, Wales. He was also raised in the South Wales Valleys.

As a young boy, Glyn played for Garn Youth (Nantyglo RFC) before making one appearance for Blaina RFC. Soon after Ebbw Vale RFC signed him up, he joined the club where he played until going to professional Rugby league in 1974. Glyn worked at Ebbw Vale Steelworks, and moved to the town to live and play rugby. After his stint as a professional rugby league footballer, he worked for Her Majesty's Prison Service as a prison officer.

== Rugby Union Playing career ==
=== Ebbw Vale RFC ===
Turner represented Ebbw Vale RFC between 1966 and 1974 scoring 147 Tries in 350 1st Team Appearances. Glyn made his début away at Stradey Park against Llanelli RFC in 1966 at the age of 19. Glyn went on to captain the club and was the only club in top-flight Welsh Rugby he played for. In the 1974 Season before going North to Rugby league he scored 15 tries in 22 games. In 2013, Glyn was made a life member of Ebbw Vale RFC.

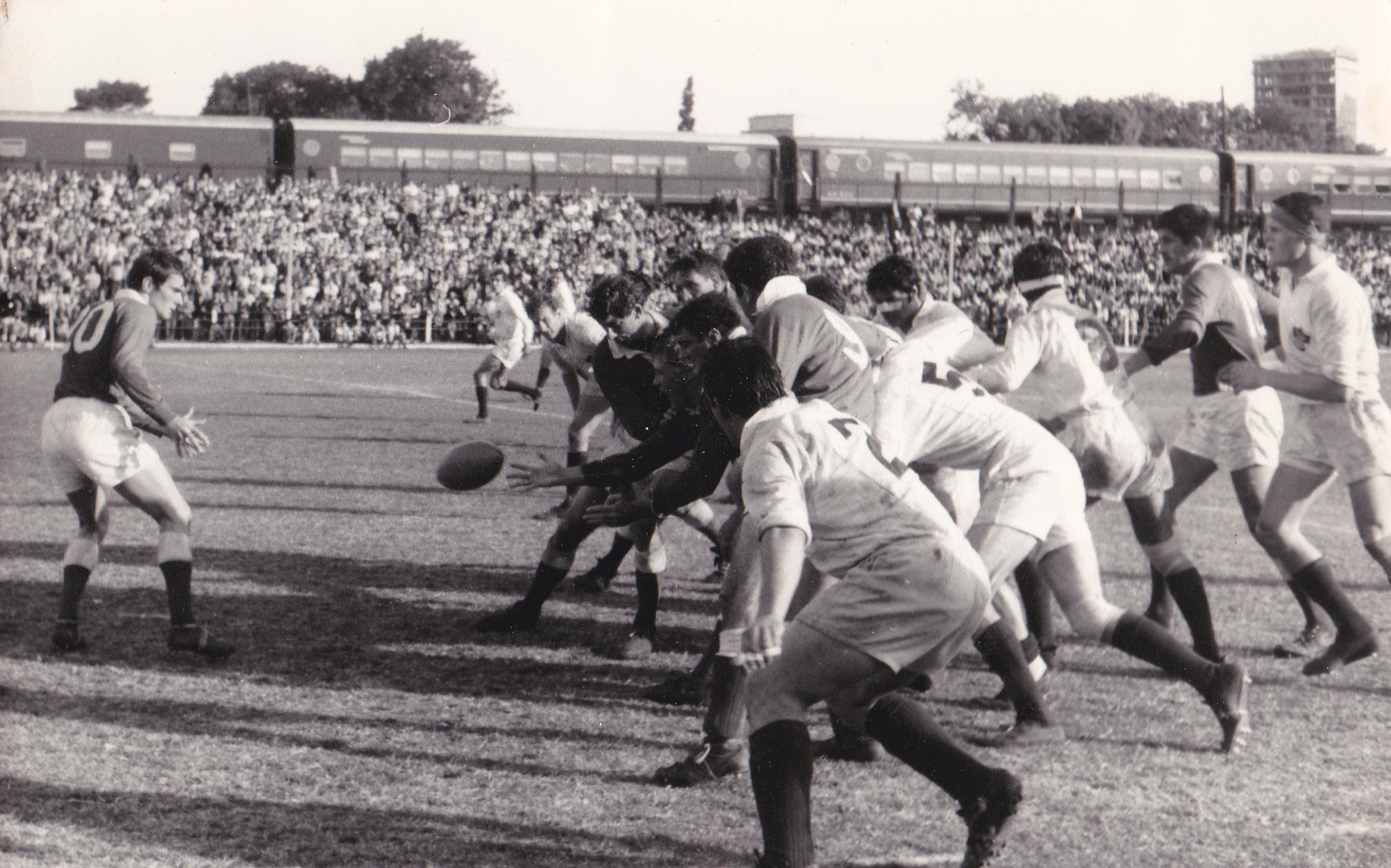
Turner on Argentina tour

=== County honours ===
Turner represented Monmouthshire County RFC, Gwent County RFC and Crawshays RFC.

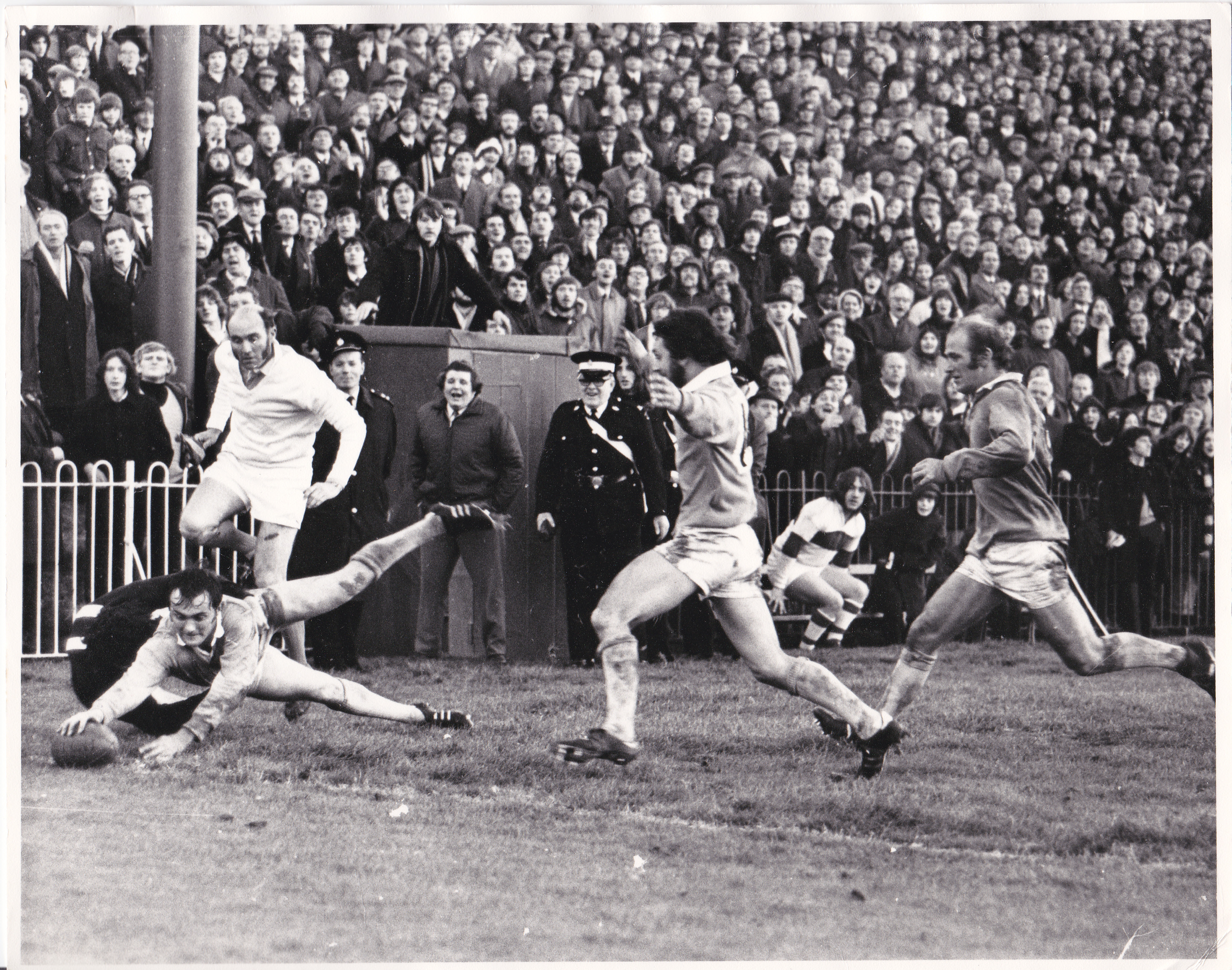
Glyn scoring against New Zealand for Gwent in 1973

== Rugby League Playing career ==
=== Hull Kingston Rovers ===
Turner changed codes from rugby union to professional rugby league when he transferred to Hull Kingston Rovers in 1974. He made 50 appearances for Hull Kingston Rovers scoring 25 tries. He made his first appearance as an unnamed substitute against Huyton RLFC where he impressed and signed him up. Glyn played for Hull Kingston Rovers until January 1978. Within a few weeks of signing for Hull Kingston Rovers, he was called up to the Wales National Team where he made his début against England in the Rugby League European Cup. Glyn Turner played stand-off in Hull Kingston Rovers' 11–15 defeat by Leeds in the 1975 Yorkshire Cup Final during the 1975–76 season at Headingley, Leeds on Saturday 15 November 1975.

=== Hull FC ===
Turner played for Hull Kingston Rovers until January 1978 when he transferred to city rivals Hull FC, and stayed there until he was forced to retire through injury in 1980. He made his last appearance for Wales in 1978 against England.

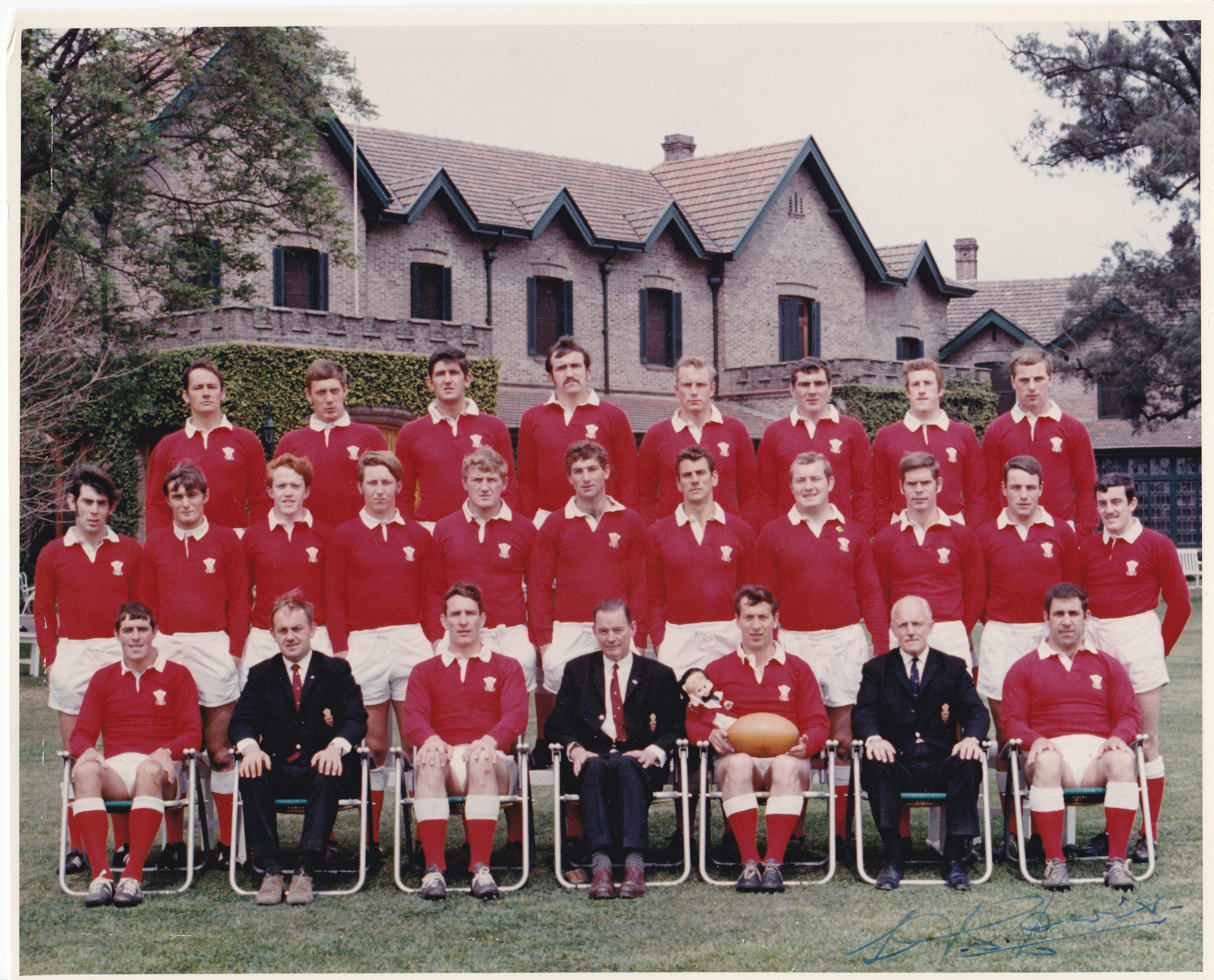
1968 Wales rugby union tour of Argentina, Middle row, 2nd from Left.

,

== International honours ==
Turner was selected to be part of the Wales Rugby Union team that toured against Argentina in 1968. Glyn was 21 years old and playing for Ebbw Vale RFC at the time and played in both of the test matches in Buenos Aires. He made his début in a side that saw the first Welsh appearances of J. P. R. Williams and Phil Bennett, both of whom went on to represent Wales and the British Lions. At the time of the tour, the Welsh Rugby Union did not issue caps for these test matches, but finally in 2013, after lengthy discussions, issued caps to international players who did not get caps at the time. (1968 Wales rugby union tour of Argentina, History of rugby union matches between Argentina and Wales)

Turner was also on the bench for the Japan match in 1973 at the Cardiff Arms Park in Cardiff as well as included in the Tonga squad in 1974. Turner also started for the Wales Under-25s match against Fiji at the Cardiff Arms Park in 1970 when the Islanders toured the Northern Hemisphere.

Turner won caps for Wales Rugby league while at Hull Kingston Rovers in the 1975 European Rugby League Championship and 1975 Rugby League World Cup against Australia, England, Australia and France. Glyn made his final Welsh appearance in 1978 when playing for Hull RLFC in the Rugby League European Cup against England. (List of Wales national rugby league team players)
