= Stuart Ferguson =

Wales dual-code rugby international footballer

Personal information
- Full name: Stuart Ferguson
- Born: 19 July 1946 (age 79) Wales

Playing information

Rugby union
- Position: Wing
Club
Years	Team	Pld	T	G	FG	P
1964–69	Swansea RFC	176	28			872
Representative
Years	Team	Pld	T	G	FG	P
	Wales

Rugby league
- Position: Fullback, Wing
Club
Years	Team	Pld	T	G	FG	P
1969–72	Leigh	112	19	328	0	713
Representative
Years	Team	Pld	T	G	FG	P
1970	Wales	1		2		4

Stuart Ferguson is a rugby union, and professional rugby league footballer who played in the 1960s and 1970s. He played representative level rugby union for Wales XV, and at club level for Swansea RFC, as a Wing, and representative level rugby league for Wales, and at club level for Leigh, as a goal-kicking fullback, or wing.

== Playing career ==
=== Leigh ===
Ferguson started his rugby league career in November 1969, joining Leigh from rugby union club Swansea RFC. He played fullback, and scored 3-goals in Leigh's 11–6 victory over Wigan in the 1969 BBC2 Floodlit Trophy Final during the 1969–70 season at Central Park, Wigan on Tuesday 16 December 1969.

Ferguson scored in all of Leigh's matches during the 1970–71 season, the only other Welshman to score in all of his club's matches in a season is David Watkins at Salford. Ferguson played fullback, and scored 2-goals in Leigh's 7–4 victory over St Helens in the 1970 Lancashire Cup final at Station Road, Swinton on Saturday 28 November 1970, and played right wing in Leigh's 24–7 victory over Leeds in the 1971 Challenge Cup Final at Wembley Stadium, London on Saturday 15 May 1971, in front of a crowd of 85,514.

Ferguson quit the sport in 1972 and returned to live in Swansea. He briefly made a comeback during the following season, but was transfer listed after two games. He made over 100 appearances during his time at Leigh.

=== International honours ===
Ferguson represented Wales XV on the 1968 Wales rugby union tour of Argentina. No caps were awarded at the time, but he was later awarded a Welsh Rugby Union President's cap.

Ferguson won a cap for Wales in rugby league while at Leigh in 1970.
