= Vic Perrins =

- Full name: Victor Charles Perrins
- Born: 3 September 1944 (age 82) Newport, Wales

Rugby union career
- Position: Hooker
International career
Years	Team	Apps	(Points)
1970	Wales	2	(0)

Victor Charles Perrins (born 3 September 1944) is a Welsh former rugby union international.

A hooker, Perrins was capped twice for Wales. He got his maiden call up during the 1969 Oceania tour to replace injured hooker Jeff Young and linked up with the team in New Zealand. His first cap however came in a match against the Springboks at Cardiff in 1970, which ended in a draw. He also played against Scotland in the 1970 Five Nations.

Perrins appeared in over 200 games for Newport RFC, before having to retire in 1972 for medical reasons.

== See also ==
- List of Wales national rugby union players
