= Walter Williams (rugby union) =

Wales international rugby union player

- Full name: Walter Johnson Williams
- Born: 14 November 1943 Clyne, Wales
- Died: 10 March 1985 (aged 41) Clyne, Wales

Rugby union career
- Position: Prop
International career
Years	Team	Apps	(Points)
1974	Wales	2	(0)

Walter Johnson Williams (14 November 1943 — 10 March 1985) was a Welsh rugby union international.

Williams, a farmer from Clyne, was a prop and played his rugby for Neath RFC. He was capped twice for Wales during the 1974 Five Nations Championship, against Ireland and France, both of which ended in draws.

In 1985, Williams stabbed his wife Janet to death and shot himself with a rifle in a murder–suicide in the kitchen of their Clyne family farm. He had been receiving treatment for depression since 1967 according to an inquest.

== See also ==
- List of Wales national rugby union players
