= John Lloyd (rugby union) =

Wales international rugby union footballer

- Born: David John Lloyd; 29 March 1943 (age 83) Pontycymer, Bridgend County Borough, Wales
- Height: 5 ft 11 in (180 cm)
- Weight: 14 st 7 lb (203 lb; 92 kg)
- School: Garw Grammar School; Cardiff Training College
- Occupation: teacher

Rugby union career
- Position: Prop
Amateur team(s)
Years	Team	Apps	(Points)
- Pontycymmer RFC
–	Bridgend RFC		
–	Glamorgan		
–	Barbarian F.C.		
International career
Years	Team	Apps	(Points)
1966–1973	Wales	24	(0)
Coaching career
- Years: Team
- 1980–1982: Wales

David John Lloyd (born 29 March 1943) is a former Welsh international rugby union player who captained the Wales team in 1972. He played club rugby for Bridgend, county rugby for Glamorgan and invitational rugby for the Barbarians. He later became head coach to the Wales national team from 1980 to 1982.

After his career in rugby, he became a P.E teacher at Ynysawdre and subsequently headteacher of Lower School of Ynysawdre. He then retired at the age of 65, in the Summer of 2005.
