= Eduardo Bello =

Argentine rugby union footballer

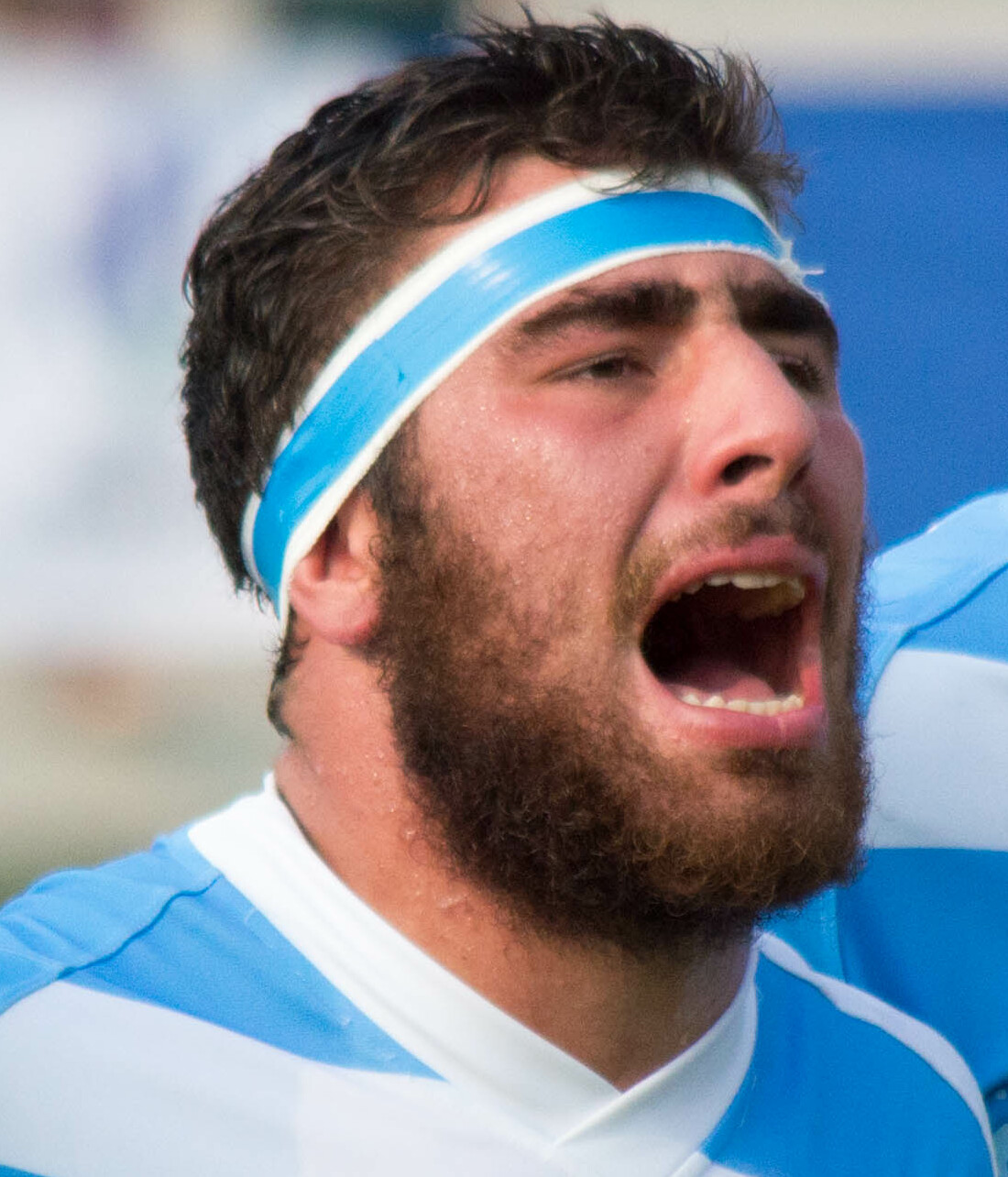
- Full name: Eduardo Miguel Bello
- Born: 27 November 1995 (age 30) Córdoba, Argentina
- Height: 1.90 m (6 ft 3 in)
- Weight: 114 kg (251 lb; 17 st 13 lb)

Rugby union career
- Position: Prop
- Current team: Newcastle Falcons
Senior career
Years	Team	Apps	(Points)
2015−2017	Atletico del Rosario	41	(15)
2017−2022	Zebre	84	(10)
2022−2023	Saracens	6	(0)
2023−26	Newcastle	16	(5)
2026-	Ulster	2	(0)
- Correct as of 3 October 2026
International career
Years	Team	Apps	(Points)
2015	Argentina U20	4	(0)
2016−2017	Argentina XV	8	(0)
2021–	Argentina	26	(5)
- Correct as of 20 July 2024

Eduardo Miguel Bello (born 27 November 1995) is an Argentine professional rugby union player who plays as a prop for URC club Ulster and the Argentina national team.

Bello played for the Argentina Under 20 in 2015, and the Argentina XV in 2016–17. He joined Italian club Zebre Parma from Club Atlético del Rosario in 2017, and played there for five seasons. He was named in the senior Argentina squad for the 2021 Rugby Championship, making his international debut against Australia. He moved to English club Saracens in 2022, and then to Newcastle Falcons the following season. He sustained an anterior cruciate ligament injury while playering for Argentina in the 2024 Rugby Championship, missing almost two seasons of rugby with Newcastle. In 2026 he signed for Ulster.
