= Rodrigo Bruni =

Argentine rugby union player

- Full name: Rodrigo Bruni Pleininger
- Born: 3 September 1993 (age 33) Tandil, Argentina
- Height: 1.88 m (6 ft 2 in)
- Weight: 110 kg (243 lb; 17 st 5 lb)

Rugby union career
- Position(s): Number 8, Flanker
- Current team: Bayonne
Senior career
Years	Team	Apps	(Points)
2014−2018	San Luis	98	(140)
2019–2020	Jaguares	15	(15)
2019	Jaguares XV	5	(5)
2021−2022	Vannes	26	(50)
2023	Brive	7	(5)
2023−	Bayonne	17	(5)
- Correct as of 25 January 2025
International career
Years	Team	Apps	(Points)
2017–2018	Argentina XV	14	(25)
2018–	Argentina	26	(10)
- Correct as of 25 January 2025

Rodrigo Bruni Pleininger (born 3 September 1993) is an Argentine professional rugby union player who plays as a number eight for Top 14 club Bayonne and the Argentina national team.

== International career ==
Bruni was a starter for the Argentina national team on 14 November 2020 in their first ever win against the All Blacks. He joined French side Vannes for the 2020–21 season.
