= Facundo Isa =

Argentine rugby union player (born 1993)

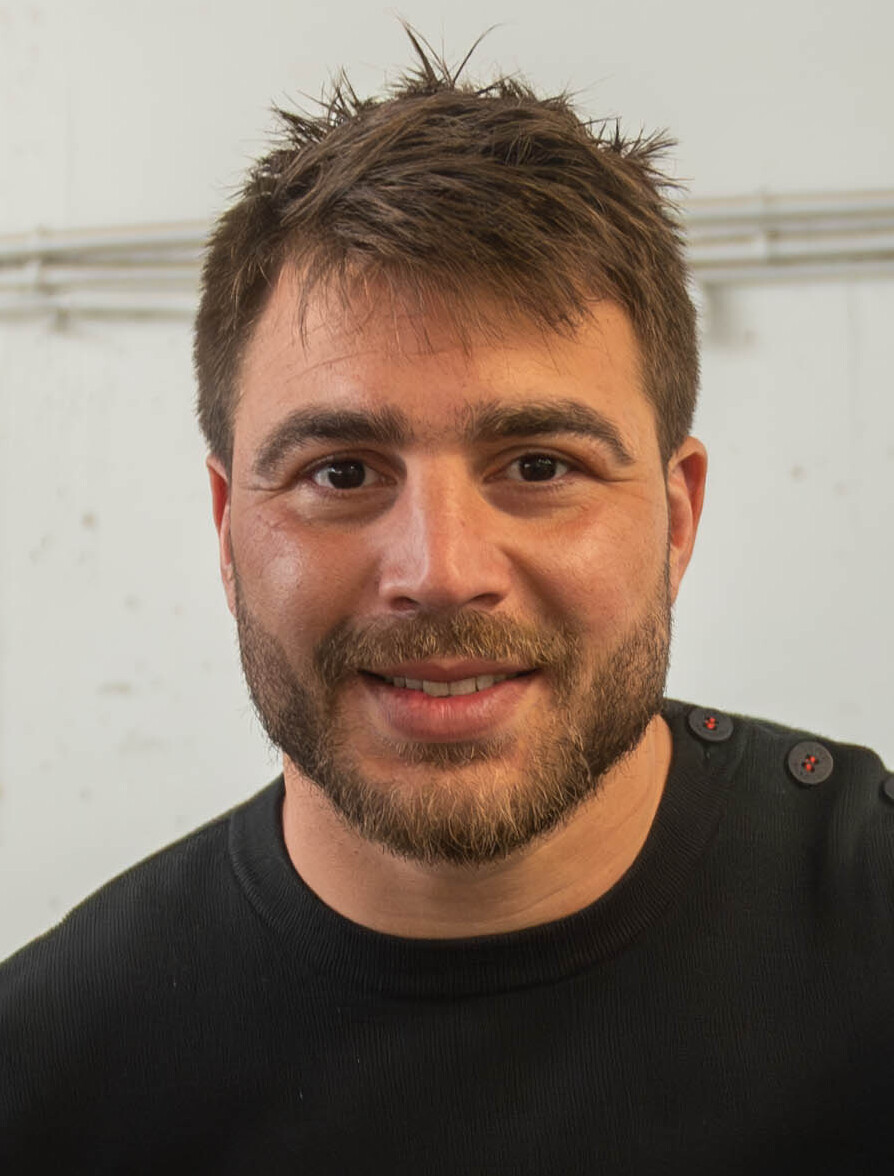
- Isa during the 2024-25 European Rugby Champions Cup, April 2025
- Born: 21 September 1993 (age 33) Santiago del Estero, Argentina
- Height: 1.88 m (6 ft 2 in)
- Weight: 112 kg (247 lb; 17 st 9 lb)

Rugby union career
- Position(s): Number 8, Flanker
- Current team: Toulon
Senior career
Years	Team	Apps	(Points)
2013	Toulon	1	(0)
2015	Pampas XV	4	(5)
2016	Jaguares	13	(20)
2017	Lyon	7	(15)
2017–	Toulon	116	(145)
- Correct as of 28 August 2023
International career
Years	Team	Apps	(Points)
2011	Argentina U19	2	(10)
2012−2013	Argentina U20	15	(15)
2014−2015	Argentina Jaguars	8	(20)
2014–	Argentina	47	(35)
- Correct as of 28 August 2023

Facundo Isa (born 21 September 1993) is an Argentine professional rugby union player who plays as a number eight for Top 14 club Toulon and the Argentina national team.

== International career ==
Isa was a member of the Argentina Under-20 side which competed in the 2012 and 2013 IRB Junior World Championships, he also represented the Argentina Jaguars side in 2014 and played for the Pampas XV during their 2014 tour of Oceania.

Isa made his senior debut for Los Pumas on 8 November 2014 in a 41–31 loss to Scotland in Edinburgh.

Isa was part of the national team which competed at the 2015 Rugby World Cup.
