= Dennis Hughes (rugby union) =

- Born: Dennis Hughes; 3 July 1941 Argoed, Wales
- School: Pengam Grammar School
- University: University College, Aberystwyth
- Occupation: Bank clerk

Rugby union career
- Position: Flanker
Amateur team(s)
Years	Team	Apps	(Points)
- Newbridge RFC
–	Barbarian F.C.		
–	Monmouthshire		
International career
Years	Team	Apps	(Points)
1967–1970	Wales	6	(0)

Dennis Hughes (born 3 July 1941) is a former Welsh rugby union international player. Hughes was born at Argoed, Caerphilly. He played as a flanker for Newbridge RFC, and won six caps for Wales during the period 1967–1970.

Hughes was selected for three matches in Wales' 1970 Five Nations campaign, playing against Scotland, England and Ireland. During the match at Twickenham, he played a part in Chico Hopkins' memorable appearance. When Gareth Edwards and Hughes both missed a tackle on Nigel Starmer-Smith, the two Wales players collided, resulting in an injury to Edwards who was unable to continue. This gave replacement Hopkins his one and only cap for his country. He took the field 20 minutes from full time and inspired the team to an impressive comeback. England had gained the upper hand and were winning 13 points to 6 until Hopkins made a try for J. P. R. Williams and followed up with a try of his own from the back of a lineout. Wales still needed a successful conversion to take a one-point lead. J. P. R. Williams duly obliged and Barry John added a drop goal well into a long injury time.
