= Francisco Gómez Kodela =

Argentine rugby union player (born 1984)

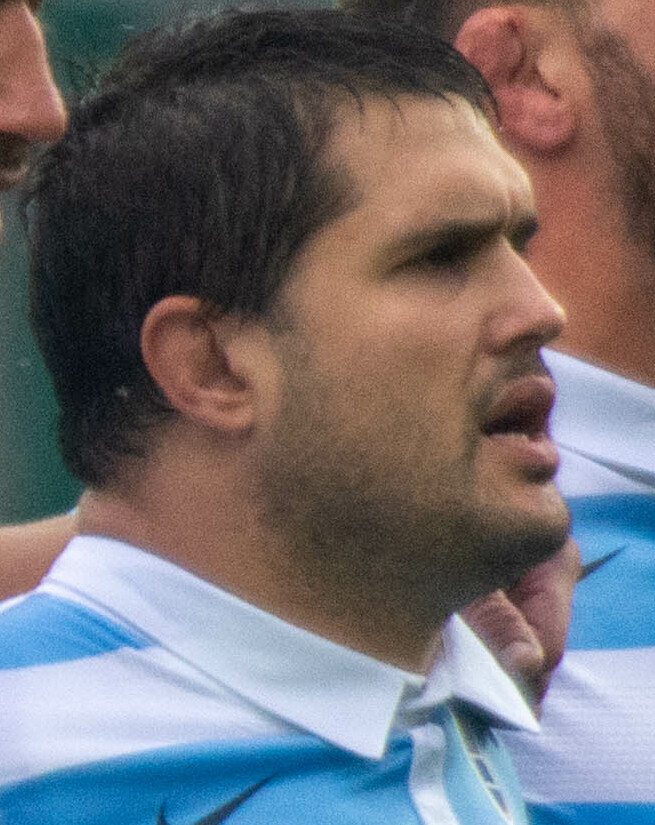
- Gómez Kodela in 2021
- Full name: Francisco Tomás Gómez Kodela
- Born: 7 July 1984 (age 42) Buenos Aires, Argentina
- Height: 1.84 m (6 ft 0 in)
- Weight: 120 kg (265 lb; 18 st 13 lb)

Rugby union career
- Position: Prop
- Current team: Stade Français
Senior career
Years	Team	Apps	(Points)
2009–2011	Belgrano	26	(5)
2011–2014	Biarritz	76	(0)
2014−2016	Bordeaux Bègles	50	(5)
2016−2023	Lyon	148	(10)
2023-	Stade Français	21	(0)
- Correct as of 28 August 2023
International career
Years	Team	Apps	(Points)
2005	Argentina U21	3	(0)
2008−2025	Argentina	31	(5)
- Correct as of 28 August 2023

Francisco Tomás Gómez Kodela (born 7 July 1984) is an Argentine professional rugby union player who plays as a prop for Top 14 club Lyon and the Argentina national team.

== International career ==
Gómez Kodela was a starter for the Argentina national team on 14 November 2020 in their first ever win against the All Blacks.
