= Marcos Kremer =

Argentina international rugby union player

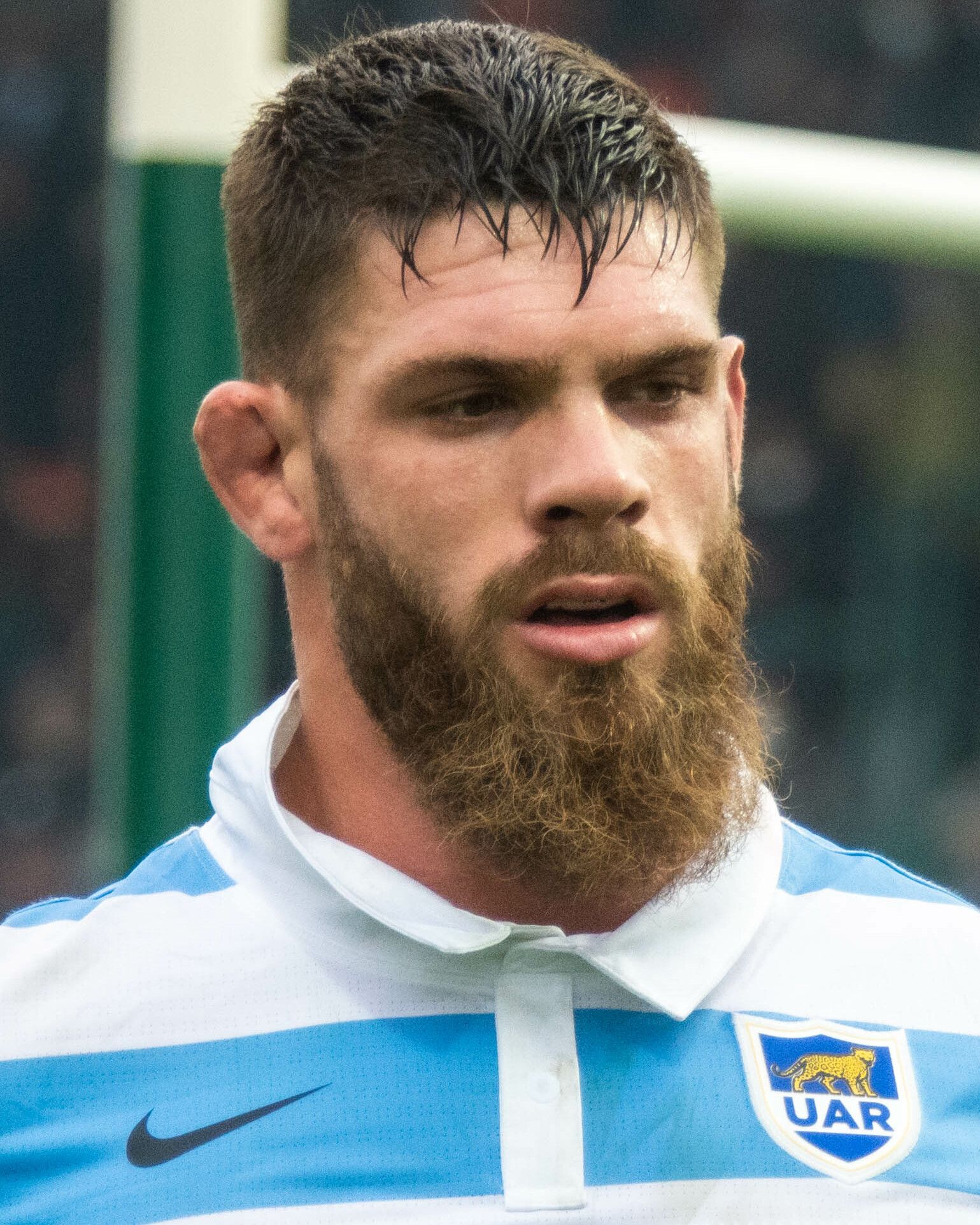
- Kremer in 2021
- Born: 30 July 1997 (age 29) Concordia, Argentina
- Height: 1.98 m (6 ft 6 in)
- Weight: 118 kg (260 lb; 18 st 8 lb)

Rugby union career
- Position(s): Flanker, Lock
- Current team: Clermont
Senior career
Years	Team	Apps	(Points)
2015−2016	Atlético del Rosario	10	(0)
2016–2020	Jaguares	52	(20)
2020–2023	Stade Français	48	(20)
2023–	Clermont	37	(0)
- Correct as of 28 August 2023
International career
Years	Team	Apps	(Points)
2016	Argentina U20	8	(10)
2016	Argentina XV	3	(0)
2016–	Argentina	80	(15)
- Correct as of 28 August 2023

Marcos Kremer (born 30 July 1997) is an Argentine professional rugby union player who plays as a flanker for Top 14 club Clermont and the Argentina national team.

== Club career ==
Having played rugby from a young age, representing Los Espinillos at the age of 15 and Club Salto Grande 16, he made his senior debut at Club Atlético del Rosario at the age of 17. He became a familiar starter at the club when he turned 18, starting in most matches in early 2016.

After strong performance at the Junior Championship, Kremer was called up to the Jaguares to train with top elite players in Argentina. On 9 July 2016, he made his Super Rugby debut at the age of 18 against New Zealand side the Highlanders.

== International career ==
In January 2016, he was called up to the Argentina XV side ahead of the 2016 Americas Rugby Championship. He made his senior debut against the United States on 6 February 2016, before even making an appearance at any of the age-grade national teams.

In May 2016, Kremer was called up to the Argentina U20's side for the 2016 World Rugby Under 20 Championship in England. He started in all 5 games at the tournament, helping Los Pumitas to a third-placed finish after beating South Africa 49–19 in the bronze final.

On 20 July 2016, Kremer was named in Argentina's 33-man squad for the 2016 Rugby Championship by Daniel Hourcade at just the age of 18.

Kremer was a starter on Argentina national team on 14 November 2020 in their first ever win against the All Blacks.
