= Tomás Lavanini =

Argentine rugby union footballer

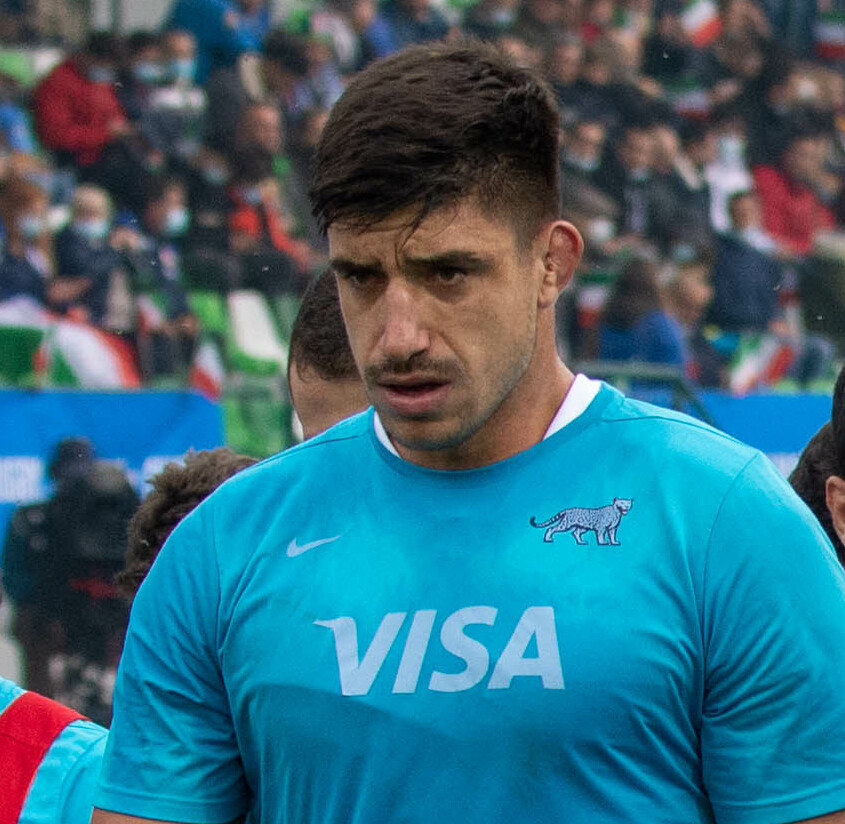
- Lavanini with Argentina in 2021
- Born: 22 January 1993 (age 33) Buenos Aires, Argentina
- Height: 2.00 m (6 ft 7 in)
- Weight: 130 kg (287 lb; 20 st 7 lb)

Rugby union career
- Position: Lock
- Current team: Highlanders
Senior career
Years	Team	Apps	(Points)
2012–2014	Hindú	8	(5)
2014	Pampas XV	7	(0)
2014–2015	Racing 92	10	(0)
2016–2019	Jaguares	49	(15)
2019–2021	Leicester Tigers	37	(10)
2021–2024	Clermont	42	(25)
2024–2025	Lyon	11	(0)
2026–	Highlanders	6	(0)
- Correct as of 28 August 2026
International career
Years	Team	Apps	(Points)
2013	Argentina U20	9	(0)
2013–	Argentina	91	(10)
- Correct as of 28 August 2026

Tomás Lavanini (born 22 January 1993) is an Argentine professional rugby union player who plays as a lock for Super Rugby club Highlanders and the Argentina national team.

== Career ==
On 6 May 2019, Leicester Tigers announced Lavanini's signing, with him set to join after the 2019 Rugby World Cup. He made his Leicester debut from the bench on 2 November 2019 against Gloucester. He played 38 times for Leicester across two seasons, scoring two tries.

He previously played for Argentine Super Rugby side Jaguares, before joining the Jaguares, he had played the 2014–15 Top 14 season with French side Racing Métro.

In January 2021 it was confirmed that he would join French Top 14 side Clermont Auvergne ahead of the 2021–22 season.

In September 2025, the Super Rugby team the Highlanders signed Lavanini ahead of their 2026 season. It was his first time back in Super Rugby since the 2019 season. Lavanini did not start for the team until round five, where he played 36 minutes against South Island rivals, the Crusaders. In total, Lavanini played six matches across the season, primarily in the No. 4 position although he was moved to No. 5 for one match. In August 2026, after being recalled into the Argentina squad for the first time in two years, Lavanini, in an interview for La Nación, noted that his move to the Highlanders came about through his agent after initially eyeing a move to Japan.

In June 2026, Lavanini re-signed with the Highlanders for 2027.

== International career ==
Lavanini represented Argentina Under 20 in the 2013 IRB Junior World Championship.

Lavanini made his senior debut for Los Pumas against Uruguay in April 2013 and was subsequently called into the squad for the 2013 Rugby Championship as injury cover for Manuel Carizza where he made his championship debut as a 74th-minute substitute in his side's 17–22 defeat to South Africa on 24 August. Tomás was part of the national team that competed at the 2015 Rugby World Cup.

Lavanini was red-carded in the second Test against South Africa in the 2017 Rugby Championship, following two yellow cards being issued to him. Lavanini made his return from suspension at home against New Zealand in Buenos Aires only to be yellow-carded for a dangerous tackle. He was red-carded for a high tackle on Owen Farrell in the pool game against England in the 2019 Rugby World Cup for which he received a four match ban.

On 21 November 2021, against Ireland, Lavanini received a record-breaking third international red card, for a high tackle. Since 2019, Lavanini is the most sin-binned rugby player in Argentina's history.

=== International tries ===
List of international tries scored by Tomás Lavanini
No.	Opponent	Location	Competition	Date	Result	Ref.
1	Georgia	Kingsholm Stadium, Gloucester (England)	2015 Rugby World Cup	25 September 2015	54–9	
2	England	Estadio San Juan del Bicentenario, San Juan	2017 England tour of Argentina	10 June 2017	34–38	
