= Mateo Carreras =

Argentine rugby union player

- Born: 17 December 1999 (age 26) Tucuman, Argentina
- Height: 1.72 m (5 ft 8 in)
- Weight: 86 kg (190 lb; 13 st 8 lb)
- University: National University of Tucumán

Rugby union career
- Position: Wing
- Current team: Bayonne
Senior career
Years	Team	Apps	(Points)
2018–2019	Los Tarcos	3	(20)
2019	Jaguares XV	4	(0)
2021–2024	Newcastle Falcons	39	(80)
2024-	Bayonne	22	(20)
- Correct as of 25 March 2024
International career
Years	Team	Apps	(Points)
2018–2019	Argentina U20	10	(25)
2020	Argentina XV	3	(0)
2021–	Argentina	30	(70)
- Correct as of 21 September 2024
National sevens team
Years	Team		Comps
2018–2019	Argentina		5
- Correct as of 28 August 2023

Mateo Carreras (born 17 December 1999) is an Argentine professional rugby union player who plays on the wing for Top 14 club Bayonne and the Argentina national team.

== Club career ==
On 21 November 2019, he was named in the Jaguares squad for the 2020 Super Rugby season.

Carreras joined Newcastle Falcons in December 2020.

In November 2023, Mateo Carreras agreed to join France's Top14 club Bayonne at the end of Newcastle's 2023-24 Premiership season.
