= Julián Montoya =

Argentine rugby union player

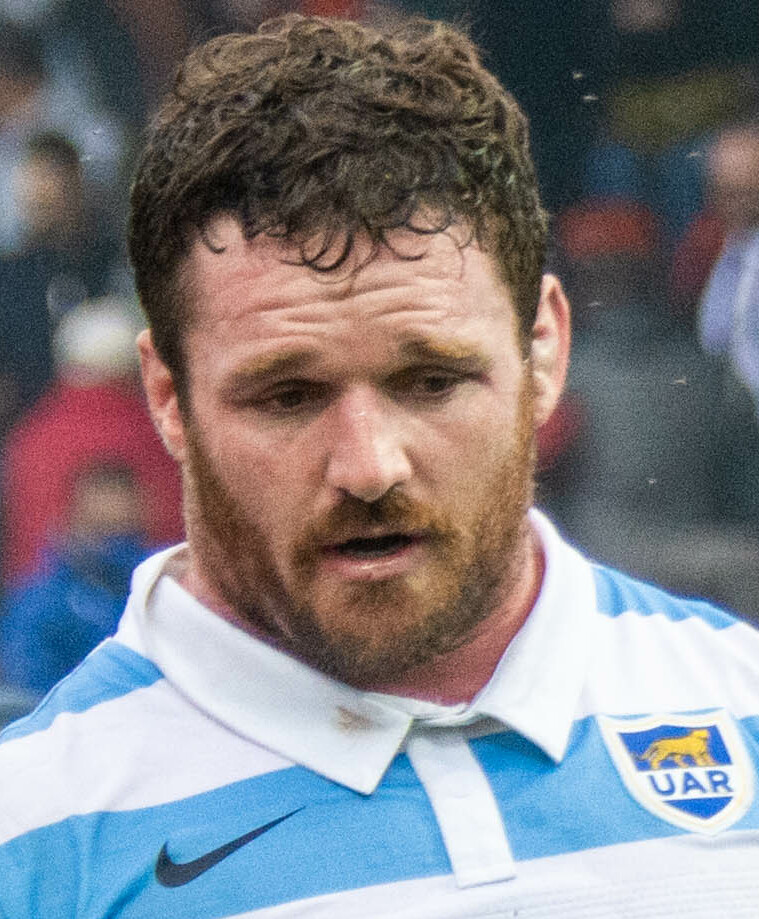
- Montoya representing Argentina during the November Internationals
- Born: 29 October 1993 (age 33) Buenos Aires, Argentina
- Height: 1.83 m (6 ft 0 in)
- Weight: 110 kg (243 lb; 17 st 5 lb)
- School: Colegio Cardenal Newman

Rugby union career
- Position: Hooker
Senior career
Years	Team	Apps	(Points)
2013–2014	Club Newman	7	(0)
2014–2015	Pampas XV	17	(5)
2016–2020	Jaguares	63	(25)
2021–2025	Leicester Tigers	78	(145)
2025–	Pau	0	(0)
- Correct as of 15 June 2025
International career
Years	Team	Apps	(Points)
2013	Argentina U20	5	(0)
2014–	Argentina	117	(80)
- Correct as of 21 April 2024

Julián Montoya (born 29 October 1993) is an Argentine professional rugby union player who plays as a hooker and captains the Argentina national team. He previously played for Premiership Rugby club Leicester Tigers, where he won the 2022 Premiership and was captain as Leicester were runners up in 2025.

== Club career ==
In June 2020, there was speculation that Montoya had agreed to join Leicester Tigers for the 2021-22 Premiership Rugby season, but the move was eventually confirmed as an immediate transfer on 20 January 2021. He started the 2022 Premiership Rugby final as Tigers beat Saracens 15–12.

On 18 June 2025, it was officially confirmed that Montoya would leave Leicester to sign for French side Pau in the Top 14 from the 2025–26 season. On February 1, 2026, Montoya scored two tries in a 32–12 win in the Top14 over RC Toulon.

== International career ==
Montoya played for Argentina national under-20 rugby union team at the 2013 IRB Junior World Championship. He later would also play for Argentina Jaguars. He had his first cap for Argentina at the 65–9 win over Uruguay, at 17 May 2014, for the South American Rugby Championship, in Paysandu, Uruguay. He played for the Argentina squad that won the competition in 2014 and 2015, twice in each of them, with a try scored on both occasions. He was called for the 2015 Rugby Championship, playing his first game at the tournament in the 39–18 loss to New Zealand, on 17 July 2015, in Christchurch. He has 8 caps for the "Pumas", with 2 tries scored, 10 points on aggregate.

Montoya was a starter for the Argentina national team on 14 November 2020 in their first ever win against the All Blacks.

He is the only Argentinian captain to have a win over Australia (2022, 2023, 2024 and 2025), New Zealand (2022 and 2025) and South Africa (2024) and he is one of a few captains to achieve this.

== Honours ==
- Leicester Tigers: Gallagher Premiership (2021/22)
