= Thomas Gallo (rugby union) =

Argentine rugby union player

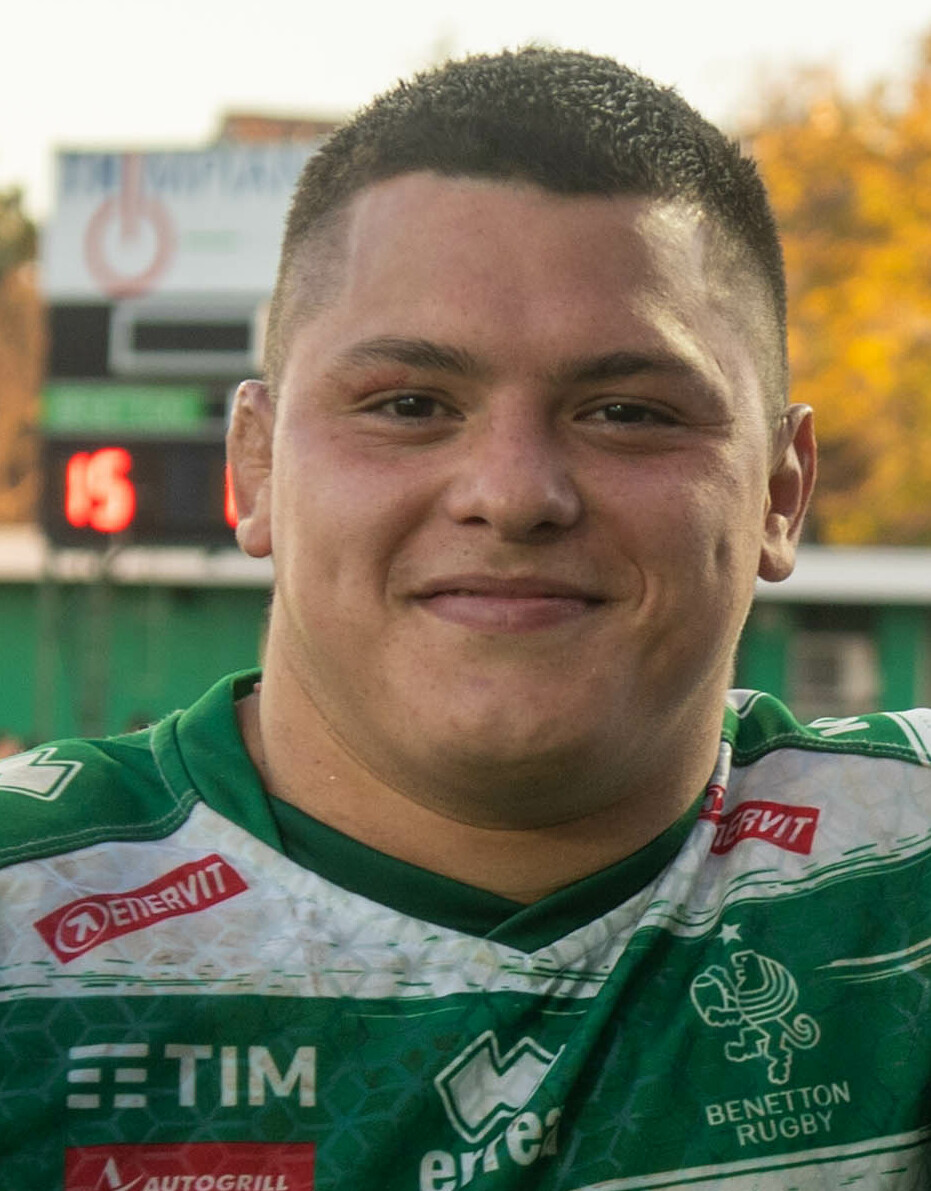
- Gallo at the 2023–24 United Rugby Championship
- Born: 30 April 1999 (age 27) Tucumán, Argentina
- Height: 1.76 m (5 ft 9 in)
- Weight: 107 kg (236 lb; 16 st 12 lb)

Rugby union career
- Position: Prop
- Current team: Benetton, Buenos Aires
Senior career
| Years | Team | Apps | (Points) |
| 2020–2026 | Benetton | 92 | (30) |
| 1999–2020 | Universitario | 34 | (0) |
- Correct as of 28 August 2023
International career
| Years | Team | Apps | (Points) |
| 2019 | Argentina U20 | 5 | (10) |
| 2021− | Argentina | 39 | (35) |
- Correct as of 28 August 2023

Thomas Gallo (born 30 April 1999) is an Argentine professional rugby union player who plays as a prop for United Rugby Championship club Benetton and the Argentina national team.

== Club career ==
Gallo signed his first professional contract for Benetton in September 2020. He made his Benetton debut in Round 6 of the 2020–21 Pro14 against Cardiff Blues.

== International career ==
In 2019, Gallo was named in the Argentina Under 20 squad. In September 2021, Gallo was named in Argentina squad for 2021 Rugby Championship. He made his debut in Round 6 of the 2021 Rugby Championship against Australia.

Gallo was eligible to play for Italy due to his grandfather's Italian ancestry, before winning his first cap for Argentina in 2021.
