= Matías Moroni =

Argentine rugby union player

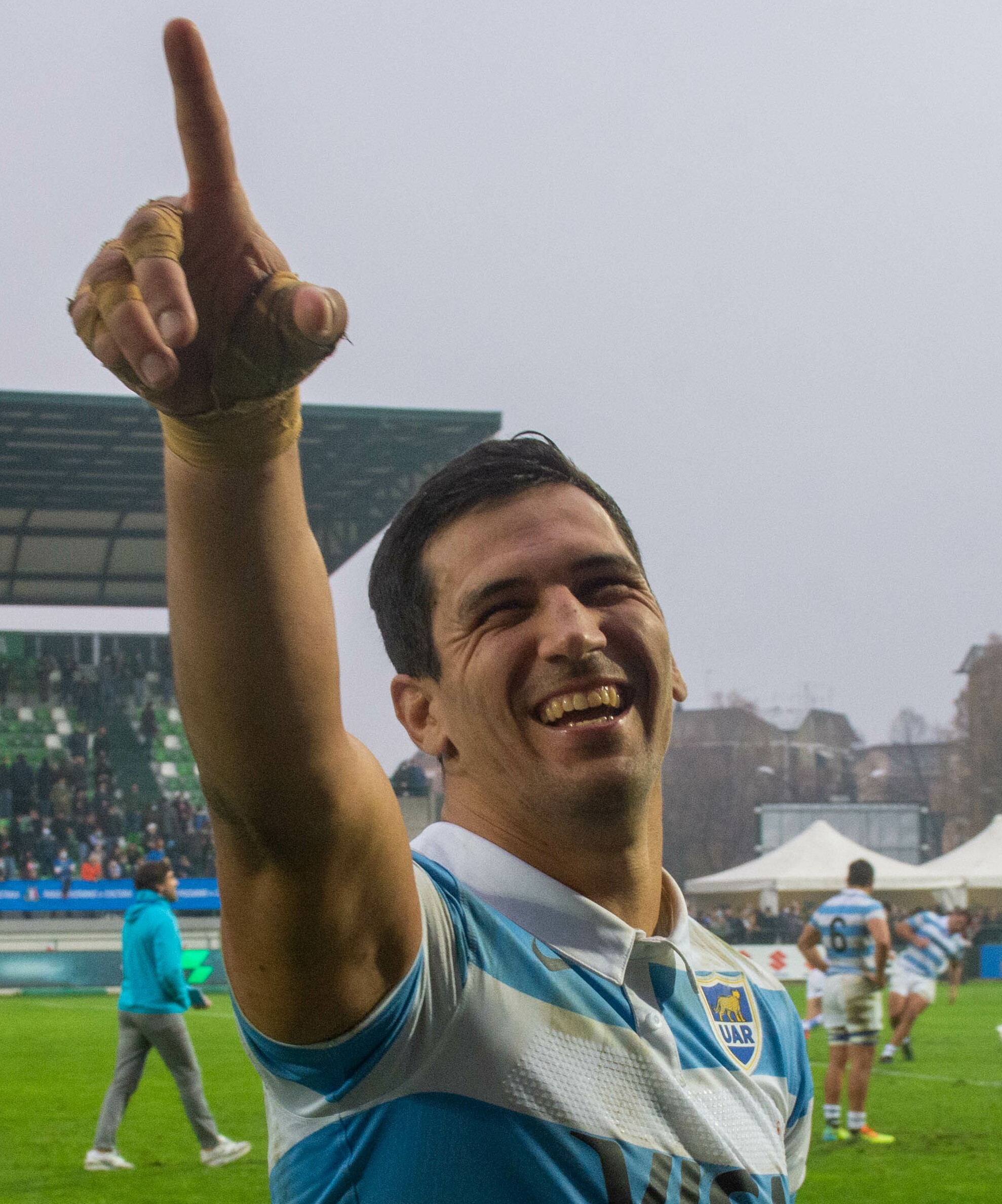
- Moroni in 2021
- Born: 29 March 1991 (age 35) Buenos Aires, Argentina
- Height: 1.84 m (6 ft 0 in)
- Weight: 85 kg (187 lb; 13 st 5 lb)

Rugby union career
- Position(s): Centre, Wing
- Current team: Bristol Bears
Senior career
Years	Team	Apps	(Points)
2010−2014	CUBA	52	(60)
2014−2015	Pampas XV	4	(0)
2016−2020	Jaguares	46	(60)
2020−2022	Leicester Tigers	35	(25)
2022–2024	Newcastle Falcons	20	(10)
2025	CA Brive	8	(0)
2025-	Bristol Bears	0	(0)
- Correct as of 25 January 2024
International career
Years	Team	Apps	(Points)
2011	Argentina U20	3	(5)
2014–	Argentina	95	(65)
- Correct as of 28 August 2023
National sevens team
Years	Team		Comps
2012−2016	Argentina		15
- Correct as of 28 August 2023

Matías Moroni (born 29 March 1991) is an Argentine professional rugby union player who plays as a centre at Premiership Rugby side Bristol Bears and the Argentina national team.

== Club career ==
Moroni played his youth in Los Molinos and the Club Universitario de Buenos Aires.

In 2016, Moroni signed with the Jaguares, Argentina's Super Rugby team.

Moroni signed for Leicester Tigers in Premiership Rugby for the 2020–21 Premiership Rugby season. He settled in quickly playing 10 of 13 games and making a positive impression, he scored his first try for Leicester against Connacht in a European Rugby Challenge Cup round of 16 game.

Moroni was recognised as a defensive lynchpin for Leicester, starting the 2022 Premiership Rugby final which Leicester won 15–12.

He was then announced as a new signing for Newcastle Falcons on 22 June 2022. He spent 2 seasons in the north of England before being released at the end of the 23/24 Premiership season.

After a 6-month career sabbatical following his release, Moroni signed for CA Brive in January 2025 marking his first venture into the French league structure. He made his debut in the Pro D2 round 16 clash between CA Brive and US Dax starting at No13 in the 22–9 loss.

In October 2025, Moroni signed a short-term deal with Bristol Bears as injury cover.

== International career ==
Moroni was a member of the Argentina Under-20 side which competed in the 2011 IRB Junior World Championship, he also represented the Pumas sevens team in 13 competitions during 2012 and 2013 and was selected by the Pampas XV for their 2014 tour of Oceania.

Moroni made his senior debut for Los Pumas on 20 June 2014 against Scotland in Córdoba. He wasn't selected by the Pumas for the 2014 Rugby Championship, however he did make the squad for the 2014 end-of-year rugby union internationals and he earned his second cap in a 20–18 win over Italy in Genoa.

Moroni competed at the 2016 Summer Olympics for the Argentina national rugby sevens team.
