= Santiago Carreras =

Argentine rugby union player

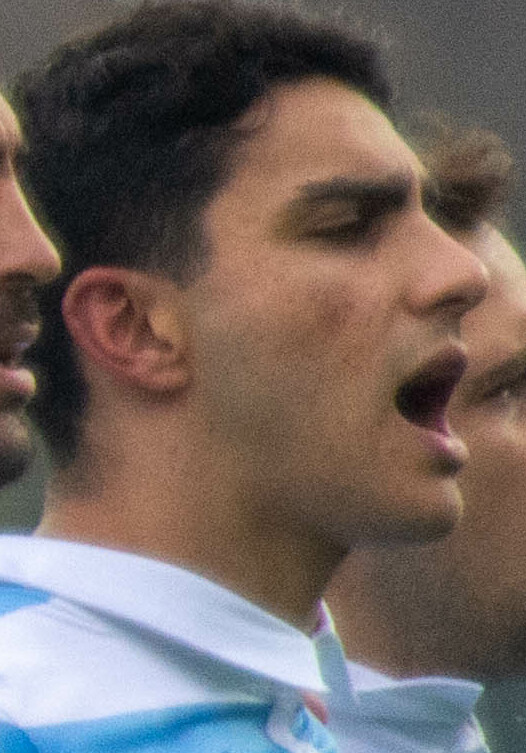
- Carreras in 2021
- Born: 30 March 1998 (age 28) Córdoba, Argentina
- Height: 1.83 m (6 ft 0 in)
- Weight: 89 kg (196 lb; 14 st 0 lb)

Rugby union career
- Position(s): Fly-half, Wing, Fullback
- Current team: Bath
Senior career
Years	Team	Apps	(Points)
2019–2020	Jaguares	12	(25)
2019	Jaguares XV	5	(15)
2020–2025	Gloucester	82	(324)
2025–	Bath	17	(38)
- Correct as of 1 May 2026
International career
Years	Team	Apps	(Points)
2017–2018	Argentina U20s	8	(9)
2018–2019	Argentina XV	6	(20)
2019–	Argentina	64	(206)
- Correct as of 18 November 2025

Santiago Carreras (born 30 March 1998) is an Argentine professional rugby union player who plays as a fly-half for Premiership Rugby club Bath and the Argentina national team.

== Club career ==
On 28 December 2018, Carreras was named in the Jaguares squad for the 2019 Super Rugby season. His playing positions are Fullback, Wing and Fly-half.

On 11 December 2020, Carreras would move to England to join Premiership side Gloucester on an undisclosed length deal from the 2020–21 season.

On 5 February 2025, it was announced Carreras would leave Gloucester to join local rivals Bath on a three-year deal from the 2025–26 season. In October 2025, he made his debut against his former club, Gloucester, replacing Tom de Glanville in a 38–17 victory.

== International career ==
Carreras was a starter for the Argentina national team on 14 November 2020 in their first ever win against the All Blacks.
