= Jerónimo de la Fuente =

Argentine rugby union footballer

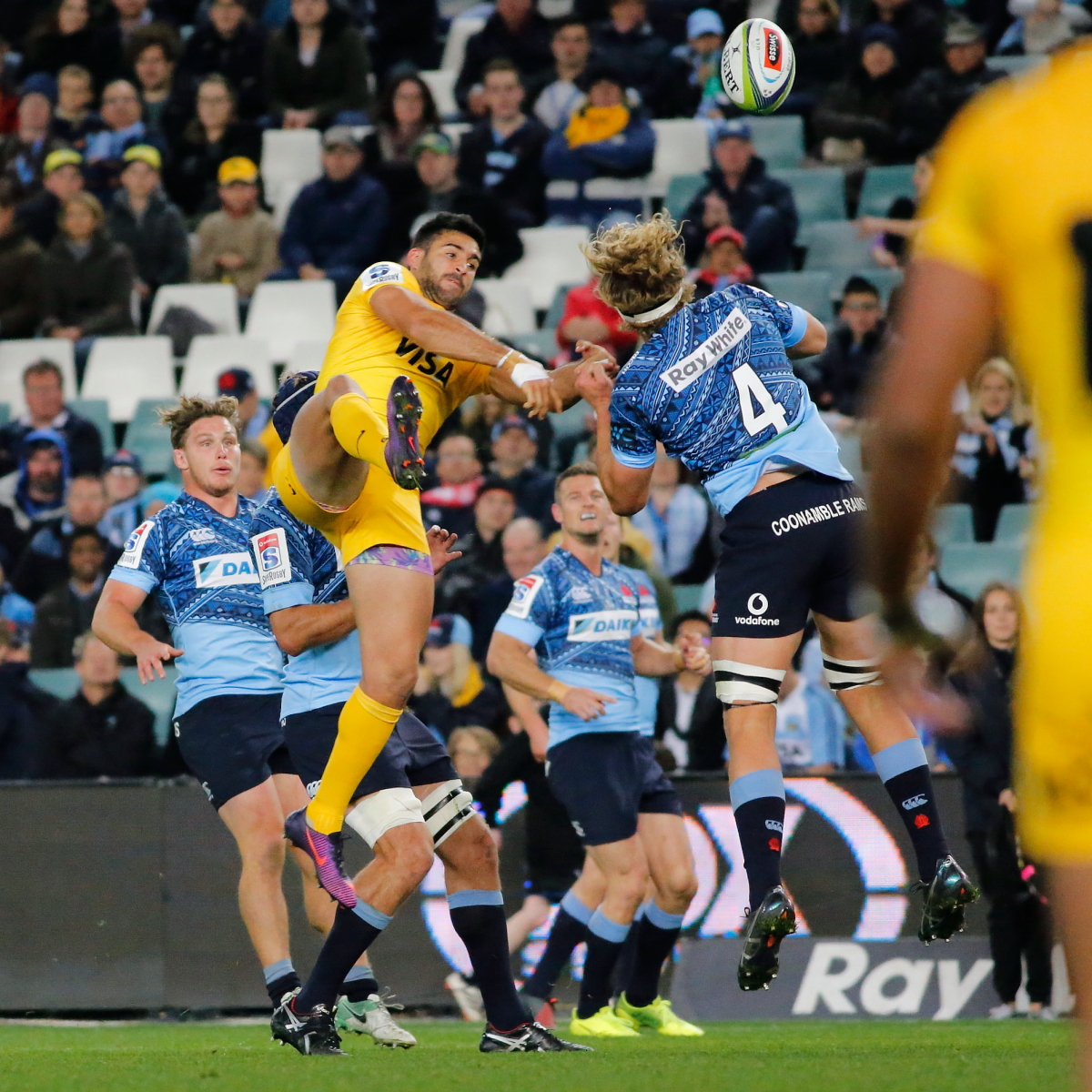
- de la Fuente representing the Jaguares during Super Rugby
- Born: 24 February 1991 (age 35) Rosario, Argentina
- Height: 1.84 m (6 ft 0 in)
- Weight: 98 kg (216 lb; 15 st 6 lb)

Rugby union career
- Position: Centre
- Current team: Perpignan
Senior career
Years	Team	Apps	(Points)
2013–2015	Pampas XV	9	(15)
2016−2020	Jaguares	51	(30)
2018	Duendes	1	(0)
2020−	Perpignan	86	(70)
- Correct as of 25 January 2024
International career
Years	Team	Apps	(Points)
2010	Argentina U19	1	(5)
2011	Argentina U20	5	(0)
2012	Argentina Jaguars	5	(10)
2014-	Argentina	80	(70)
- Correct as of 20 July 2024
National sevens team
Years	Team		Comps
2012–2013	Argentina		13
- Correct as of 28 August 2023

Jerónimo de la Fuente (born 24 February 1991) is an Argentine professional rugby union player who plays as a centre for Top 14 club Perpignan and the Argentina national team.

== Club career ==
De la Fuente began his club career in his native Argentina for the Duendes Rugby Club in his home city of Rosario. He earned selection for the Pampas XV squad for the 2013 Vodacom Cup in South Africa and also for their tour of Australia in 2014.

De la Fuente played for the Jaguares from 2016 to 2020, when he moved to France to play for USA Perpignan.

== International career ==
De la Fuente played for Argentina Under-20 at the 2011 IRB Junior World Championship. He then played further representative rugby for the Argentina Jaguars and the Pumas 7s throughout 2012 and 2013.

De la Fuente made his senior international debut in 2014. His first appearance for Los Pumas came on 17 May 2014 against Uruguay, he followed that up a week later with a try on his second international appearance against Chile. He was then selected in the Pumas squad for the 2014 mid-year rugby union internationals in which he appeared twice in losses to Ireland, but was left out for their final match against Scotland. Despite this he was named in the 30-man squad for the 2014 Rugby Championship. He was not initially selected for the Pumas opening match against the Springboks, however a late injury to Juan Martín Hernández saw De la Fuente promoted to the replacements bench and he made his championship debut as a second-half substitute in a 6–13 loss.
