= Tuʻungafasi (surname) =

Tuʻungafasi is a surname. Notable people with the surname include:

- Isi Tuʻungafasi (born 1995), Tongan born New Zealand rugby union player
- Leka Tuʻungafasi, Tongan rugby union player
- Mofuike Tuʻungafasi, Tongan rugby union player
- Ofa Tuʻungafasi (born 1992), Tongan rugby union player
