= Patrick Tuipulotu =

NZ rugby union player (born 1993)

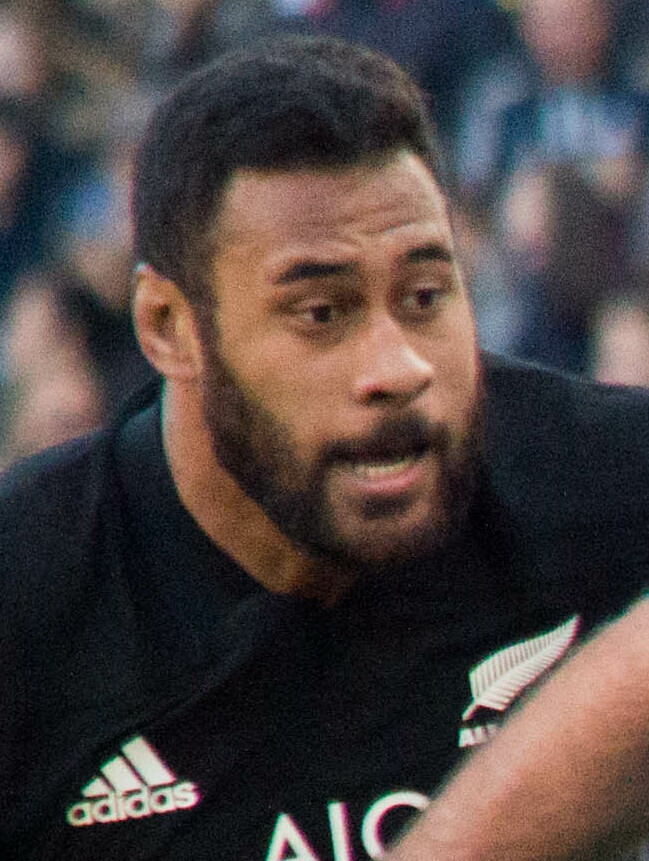
- Tuipulotu in 2016
- Full name: Patrick Tito Tuipulotu
- Born: 23 January 1993 (age 33) Christchurch, New Zealand
- Height: 198 cm (6 ft 6 in)
- Weight: 120 kg (265 lb; 18 st 13 lb)
- School: St. Peter's College

Rugby union career
- Position: Lock
- Current team: Auckland, Blues
Senior career
Years	Team	Apps	(Points)
2013–	Auckland	31	(50)
2014–	Blues	124	(95)
2022	Toyota Verblitz	11	(10)
- Correct as of 27 June 2026
International career
Years	Team	Apps	(Points)
2013	New Zealand U20	5	(5)
2014–	New Zealand	56	(35)
2022	All Blacks XV	2	(0)
- Correct as of 6 October 2024

Patrick Tito Tuipulotu (born 23 January 1993) is a New Zealand rugby union player who plays as a lock for the Blues in Super Rugby and Auckland in the Bunnings NPC.

== Career ==
=== Early career ===
Tuipulotu was educated at St Peter's College in Auckland and made his debut for his local side in the 2013 ITM Cup, where he made seven appearances and scored one try. His impressive displays saw him named in the Blues squad for the 2014 Super Rugby season.

Tuipulotu competed for the New Zealand Under-20s at the 2013 IRB Junior World Championship where he made five appearances and scored one try.

He was named in a preliminary training squad for the All Blacks on 12 May 2014. Tuipulotu was then selected for the All Blacks' squad for the first time on 1 June 2014. He made his All Blacks debut as a substitute in the 28–27 win, against England on 14 June 2014. Tuipulotu did not feature much on debut, replacing the in-form Brodie Retallick with only four minutes left. He then did the same the following week, except New Zealand beat England 36-13, again using Tuipulotu as a substitute.

After being used off the bench twice more during the 2014 Rugby Championship, Tuipulotu earned his first start for the All Blacks against the USA on 1 November 2014. Tuipulotu played the full 80 minutes against the USA, scoring the first try of his international career during the first half of the 71-6 victory. Tuipulotu then rounded his year off with two more appearances off the bench during the end-of-year tour.

=== 2015–2016 ===
Tuipulotu did not play any international rugby in 2015, missing out on the World Cup due to injury. Following his comeback to Super Rugby after recovering, Tuipulotu was selected for the All Blacks' 32-man squad for the 2016 Steinlager series against Wales. Tuipulotu came off the bench in the first two tests of the series and went on to start against Argentina in the second test against them in the Rugby Championship.

Following injury to Brodie Retallick and Sam Whitelock, as well as the death of Luke Romano's relative, Tuipulotu started in a historic 29-40 first-time loss against Ireland in Chicago, on 5 November 2016, with Blues teammate Jerome Kaino, who was shifted from blindside flanker to lock, following uncapped locks Scott Barrett and Vaea Fifita being called up as injury cover. Tuipulotu played the majority of the test before being replaced by Ardie Savea in the 59th minute. The poor performances of Tuipulotu, Kaino, Joe Moody and Aaron Smith were later criticised, with the unusual locking combination against Ireland generally accepted as the cause of New Zealand's loss. Starting in combination with the now-capped Barrett against Italy the following week, Tuipulotu scored his second test try, producing a much better performance in the 68-10 win.

=== 2017–2018 ===
Tuipulotu did not play against the British & Irish Lions in 2017 after he was late to a Blues training session, following missing much of the season with injury. The 2017 Super Rugby season was a mixed season for Tuipulotu, who scored many tries but struggled to play consistently because of his persistent injury troubles. Following the end of Super Rugby, Tuipulotu was named as captain of Auckland for the 2017 Mitre 10 Cup season, by Auckland coach Paul Feeney.

Following his mixed start to the season, he was not selected for All Blacks 33-man Lions tour squad, losing his spot to Scott Barrett, but was re-called near the end of the 2017 Rugby Championship as Brodie Retallick was unavailable. After making four appearances off the bench for the All Blacks during 2017, Tuipulotu regathered form previously lost to injury and made a start against a French XV, in a 28-23 win, scoring a try against them and was chosen to start over Barrett for the final test of the year, against Wales in a 33-18 win. Tuipulotu started in combination with All Black Captain, Sam Whitelock, against Wales and was replaced by Barrett in the 46th minute.

Tuipulotu was very good during the 2018 Super Rugby season but missed many fixtures due to injury. After four months' absence, Tuipulotu returned to rugby, on 7 September 2018, to captain Auckland against Tasman. Tuipulotu scored a hat-trick in the first half of the game, leading his team to a 36-10 win.

Having missed the 2018 June rugby union tests with injury, his outstanding performance against Tasman earned him a re-call to the All Blacks, for the 2018 Rugby Championship, after Brodie Retallick was ruled out for the rest of the competition with a shoulder injury. TJ Faiane took over as Auckland's captain in Tuipulotu's absence. Tuipulotu's return from injury also displaced Luke Romano from the All Blacks, leaving Tuipulotu and Scott Barrett as back-up to Sam Whitelock. Tuipulotu played his first test of 2018 in New Zealand's shock loss to South Africa, on 15 September at Westpac Stadium. Tuipulotu also came off the bench in the next two tests of the competition, which were the last.

With Brodie Retallick back from injury, Tuipulotu only played twice during the 2018 end-of-year tour. He played well in both tests, which were starts in a 69-31 victory over Japan and a 66-3 victory over Italy. Tuipulotu's great form through 2018 then saw him named as co-captain for the Blues' 2019 Super Rugby season, by new head coach, Leon MacDonald. Tuipulotu captained alongside loose forward Blake Gibson, and succeed Augustine Pulu as the team's leader.

== Honours ==
New Zealand

- Rugby World Cup / Webb Ellis Cup
  - Third-place: 2019
  - Blues
  - Super Rugby Pacific
  - Champions: 2024
  - Honor/SAU/Apolima
