= Brodie Retallick =

NZ rugby union player (born 1991)

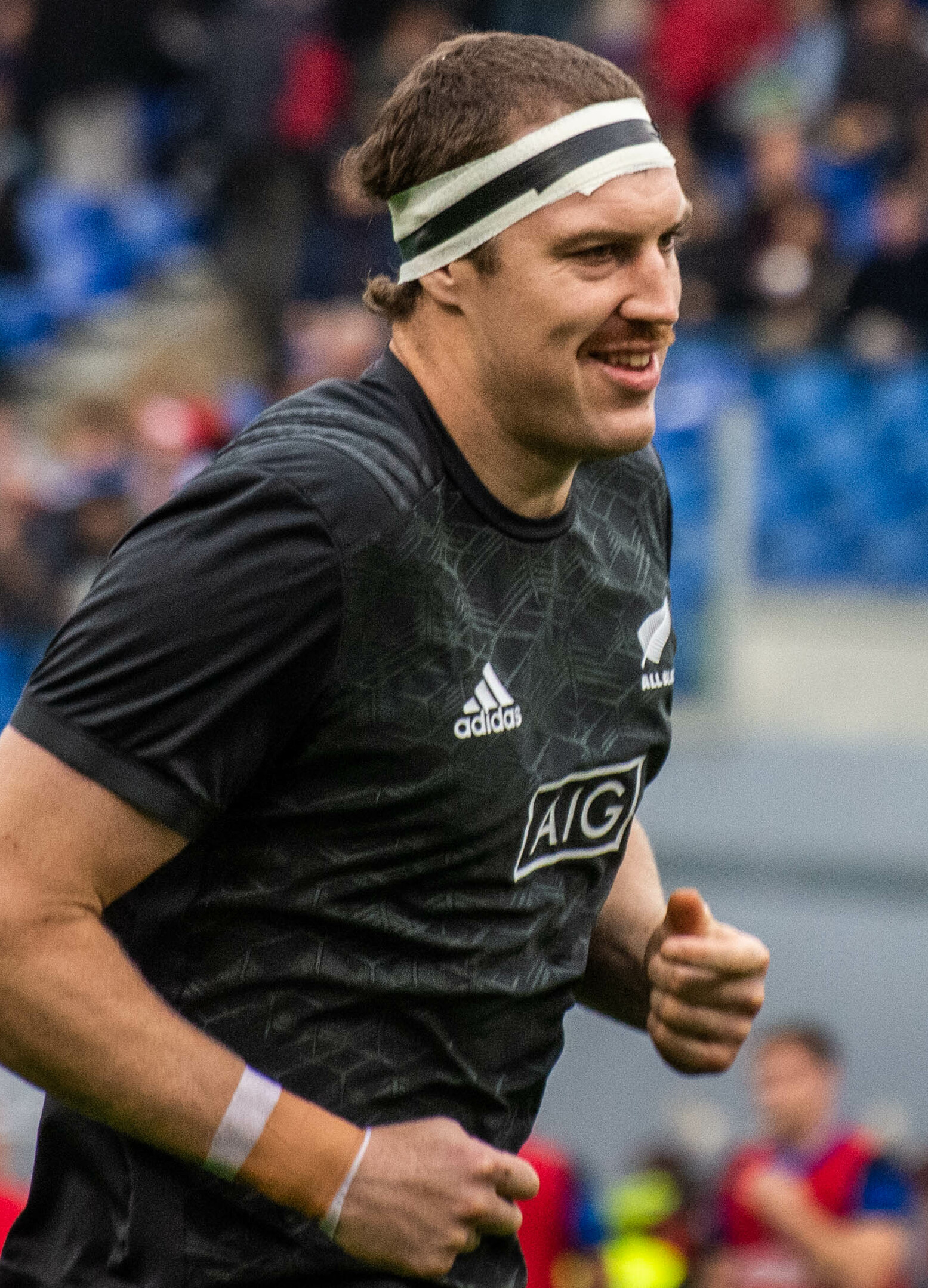
- Retallick in 2018
- Full name: Brodie Allan Retallick
- Born: 31 May 1991 (age 35) Rangiora, New Zealand
- Height: 204 cm (6 ft 8 in)
- Weight: 120 kg (265 lb; 18 st 13 lb)
- School: Christchurch Boys' High School
- Notable relative(s): Culum Retallick (cousin); John Ashworth (uncle)

Rugby union career
- Position: Lock
- Current team: Kobelco Steelers
Senior career
Years	Team	Apps	(Points)
2010–2023	Hawke's Bay	13	(5)
2012–2019 2022–2023	Chiefs	128	(100)
2020–2021 2023–	Kobelco Steelers	69	(200)
- Correct as of 9 June 2026
International career
Years	Team	Apps	(Points)
2011	New Zealand U20	4	(0)
2012–2023	New Zealand	109	(45)
- Correct as of 29 October 2023
Medal record
Men's Rugby union
Representing New Zealand
Rugby World Cup
Gold medal – first place	2015 England	Squad
Bronze medal – third place	2019 Japan	Squad
Silver medal – second place	2023 France	Squad

Brodie Allan Retallick (born 31 May 1991) is a New Zealand rugby union footballer, who currently plays as a lock for Kobelco Kobe Steelers in the Japan Rugby League One competition. He previously played for the Chiefs in Super Rugby and Hawke's Bay in New Zealand's National Provincial Championship.

Retallick made his international debut for New Zealand in 2012 and has been a regular starter ever since, with over 100 test caps. He was a key member of the 2015 Rugby World Cup-winning team, the winner of World Rugby Player of the Year in 2014 and is the award's youngest winner to date.

Retallick has earned frequent comparisons to the late former All Black lock, Sir Colin Meads.

== Career ==
=== Early career ===
Retallick played for the Hawkes Bay Magpies in the 2010 and 2011 ITM Cup.

He represented New Zealand under 20 in the 2011 IRB Junior World Championship.

Retallick earned a contract with the Chiefs for the 2012 Super Rugby season and had become a regular starter for the Chiefs by the end of the season. He started in the Super Rugby Final, on 4 August that year, with the Chiefs winning against the Sharks 37–6.

His debut for the All Blacks was against Ireland on 9 June 2012, during their tour of New Zealand. Retallick started on debut, in a locking combination with Sam Whitelock, a combination that has been regularly used by the All Blacks ever since Retallick's debut, which ended in a 42–10 win for New Zealand. Retallick played in every match for the All Blacks, either from the bench or starting, in the 2012 Rugby Championship, playing 13 games for the national side in total for the 2012 season.

=== 2013–2015 ===
He started again for the Chiefs in the 2013 Final. Retallick then continued his workload for the All Blacks by playing a further 11 tests during the year, and was a regular starter for the All Blacks by the time the 2013 Rugby Championship had started, with Luke Romano battling with injury. He cemented his place in the side on 14 September 2013, winning the award for Man of the Match against South Africa. Retallick scored a try in the 22nd minute, which was the first of his international career, and played the full 80 minutes, as the All Blacks beat South Africa 29–15.

By 2014, he was an automatic selection for the All Blacks. Retallick played in 12 tests for the All Blacks in 2014 and won the World Rugby Player of the Year award and the Kelvin R Tremain award for the best New Zealand-based player of the year.

Retallick was selected by head coach Steve Hansen as one of 31 players for New Zealand's squad for the 2015 World Cup after a string of outstanding performances for the All Blacks and the Chiefs. Retallick played well during the competition, earning him a starting spot for the quarter-final against France on 17 October 2015. Retallick scored the opening try against France in the 11th minute and lasted the full 80 minutes of the quarter-final as the All Blacks beat France by a record 62–13. Retallick played the full 80 minutes of both the semi-final, a 20–18 win over South Africa, and the final on 31 October, when the All Blacks beat Australia 34–17, becoming the first team to win three Rugby World Cups.

=== 2016–2017 ===
Retallick was subbed off towards the end of the last Bledisloe Cup test against Australia, on 22 October 2016, in Auckland, following a concussion caused by Dean Mumm elbowing him. This saw Retallick miss a test against Ireland on the end of year tour that year. The first test against Ireland in Chicago was the only test Retallick missed that year. Retallick returned to test rugby with a solid performance off the bench in the 68–10 win against Italy and returned to his starting position in the second test against Ireland in Dublin, on 19 November 2016. New Zealand beat Ireland in the second test, with a 21–9 win.

Retallick was selected as one of the 33 players for the All Blacks to face Samoa and the touring British & Irish Lions in 2017. Retallick took over as captain of the All Blacks for the final 20 minutes of the 78–0 thrashing of Samoa, following captain Ben Smith being subbed off for debutant Jordie Barrett. Retallick was arguably the best performing New Zealander in the Lions series, dominating the Lions in all three tests of the drawn series, which finished on 8 July, with a 15–15 stalemate.

Prior to being rested for a test against Argentina in Buenos Aires for the 2017 Rugby Championship, Retallick had played every minute of every All Blacks test in 2017. Retallick did not play in 2017 again, following the previous fixture, however, which was a 57–0 win against South Africa, where he scored his fourth test try, because of personal reasons. Patrick Tuipulotu was recalled to the All Blacks following Retallick's personal issues. Rookie lock Scott Barrett became a regular starter for the All Blacks in Retallick's absence.

=== 2018 ===
Retallick returned to playing rugby for the Chiefs in the 2018 Super Rugby season and scored the first double of his Super Rugby career on 16 March 2018, returning from an eye injury, to enable a Chiefs comeback to beat the Bulls 41–28. He finished the competition with six tries (second-to-most in the Chiefs for the season).

Retallick missed the 2018 series against France due to a pectoral injury. Retallick was re-selected for the All Blacks for the 2018 Rugby Championship. Retallick played his first test of 2018, on 18 August, when the All Blacks beat Australia 38–13 in Sydney. Retallick played the full 80 minutes and scored a try in the 51st minute. Retallick won the award for Man of the Match, earning him comparisons to late All Black great, Colin Meads. Retallick's try against the Wallabies later went on to win him the award for IRP Try of the Year.

He played three tests during the 2018 Rugby Championship, being replaced only nine minutes into the first test against Argentina, on 8 September 2018. Retallick was replaced by Sam Whitelock, with the All Blacks winning 46–24. Retallick missed the rest of the competition due to the injury suffered against Argentina.

New Zealand had Retallick back in the squad in time for the 2018 end-of-year tour, where he featured in four tests. He replaced Sam Whitelock off the bench against Australia in the third Bledisloe Cup test, which was a win, 37–20. Retallick then displaced Scott Barrett for the tests against England and Ireland. Retallick was Man of the Match against England in a narrow 16–15 win, with England back-rower Sam Underhill denied a winning try.

Although he was the best player on the field against England, Retallick was unable to play the same way the following week, on 17 November 2018. That day, Ireland beat the All Blacks, with Retallick performing poorly in their 9–16 loss. Retallick finished the season off with a better performance against Italy, where he replaced Scott Barrett off the bench in a 66–3 win.

=== 2019 ===
Retallick was named as the Chiefs' co-captain, alongside his injured All Blacks teammate, Sam Cane. Although the Chiefs performed poorly throughout the season, Retallick returned from injuries to guide the team to the playoffs.

Having been retained in New Zealand's squad for the 2019 Rugby Championship, Retallick played two tests during the competition. Retallick scored his fifth test try against Argentina in a scrappy 20–16 win, but was subbed off against South Africa the following week, having dislocated his shoulder during the 16–16 draw. Retallick was replaced by Hurricanes loose forward, Vaea Fifita, but was not injured badly. Blues Captain, Patrick Tuipulotu, became a regular starter in Retallick's absence.

On 28 August, All Blacks Head Coach, Steve Hansen named Retallick as one of 31 players in New Zealand's squad for the 2019 Rugby World Cup. Although still recovering from his shoulder injury, this was set to be Retallick's second World Cup. Retallick started in all four tests he played during the World Cup, including the playoffs. After New Zealand lost the semi-final to England, 7–19, Retallick went on to win Man of The Match in the Bronze Final, where they beat Wales 40–17 to claim third place.

=== 2020–2021 ===
On 11 June 2019, Retallick re-signed with New Zealand Rugby for another three years. His contract contained a clause that allowed him to play two seasons in Japan’s Top League. During the 2020 and 2021 Top League seasons, he played a total of 15 games for Kobelco Steelers.

While he was not available for the All Blacks in 2020, he was again named in the squad for the 2021 Rugby Championship and 2021 end-of-year tour.

=== 2022 ===
At the age of 31, Retallick became the 12th All Black to reach 100 tests. This occurred against England at Twickenham on Saturday 19 November 2022. This also became a world record lock combination of 64 tests with Sam Whitelock.

=== 2023 ===
On 8 February 2023, it was announced that Retallick would return to Kobelco Kobe Steelers in the Japan Rugby League One competition. He had signed a three-year deal with the club that is coached by his former Chiefs coach Dave Rennie. He finished his Super Rugby career at the Chiefs having played 128 games for the franchise.

== Personal life ==
In his free time, Retallick enjoys cruising in classic cars. Retallick married Niki Thompson, a nurse, in 2015. Together they have two daughters.

== Honours ==
=== Super Rugby ===
- Super Rugby Champion: 2012, 2013

=== Japan Rugby League One ===
- Japan Rugby League One Champion: 2025–2026

=== Individual ===
- New Zealand Rugby Player of the Year
  - Winner: 2014
- World Rugby Player of the Year
  - Winner: 2014
- IRP Try of the Year
  - Winner: 2018

=== International ===
- Rugby World Cup / Webb Ellis Cup
  - Winners: 2015
  - Runner-Up: 2023
  - 3rd Place: 2019
- Tri Nations/The Rugby Championship
  - Winners: 2012, 2013, 2014, 2016, 2017, 2018, 2021, 2022, 2023
- Bledisloe Cup
  - Winners: 2012, 2013, 2014, 2015, 2016, 2017, 2018, 2021, 2022, 2023
- Dave Gallaher Trophy
  - Winners: 2013 (2x), 2016
- Freedom Cup
  - Winners: 2012, 2013, 2014, 2015, 2016, 2017, 2019, 2021, 2023
- Hillary Shield
  - Winners: 2013, 2014 (2x), 2018, 2022
- British & Irish Lions series
  - Winners: 2017 (drawn series – shared title)
- World Rugby Team of the Year (New Zealand)
  - Winners: 2012, 2013, 2014, 2015, 2016
- Laureus Team of the Year (New Zealand)
  - Winners: 2016
