= 2017 Rugby Championship =

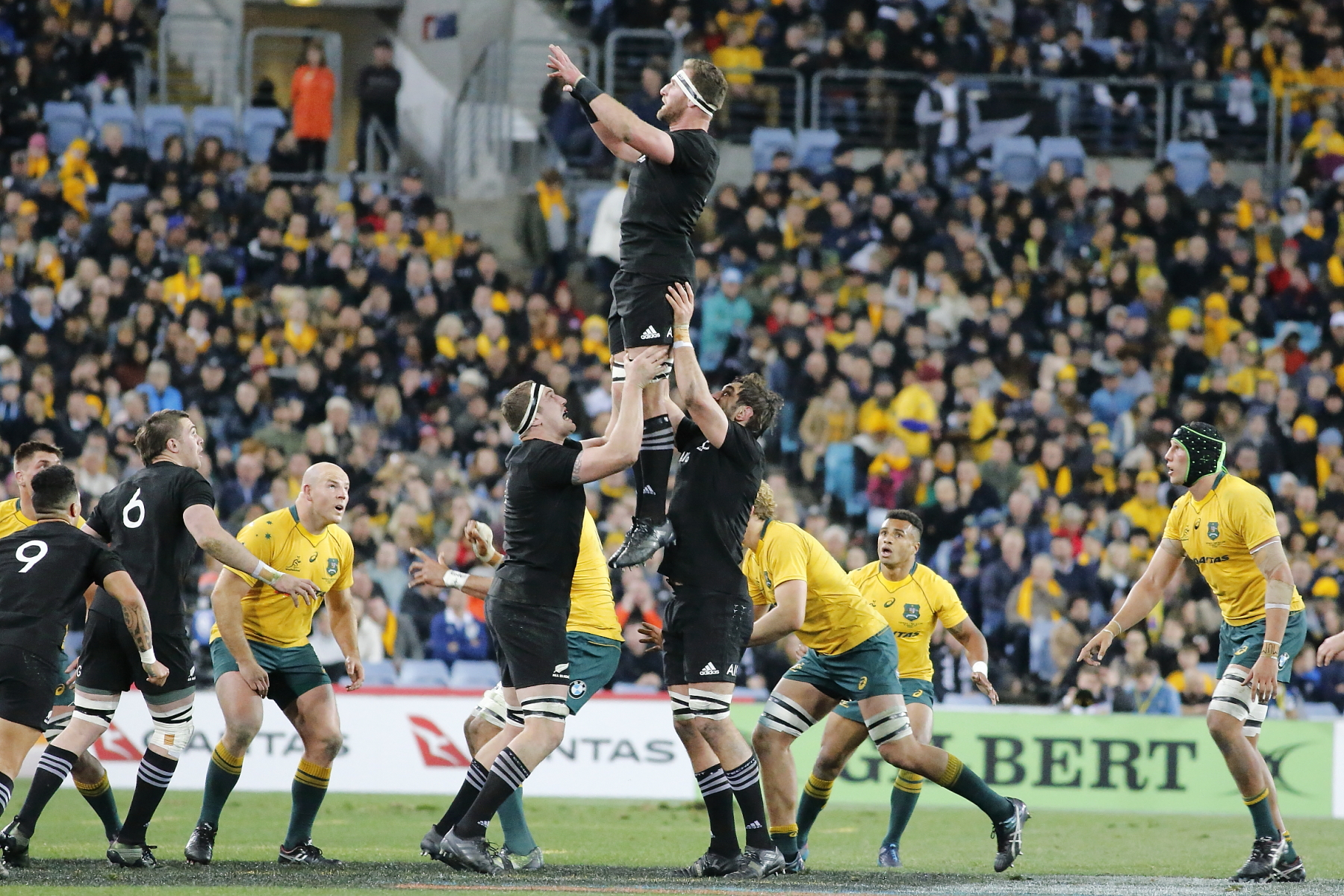
- Date: 19 August 2017 – 7 October 2017
- Countries: Argentina; Australia; New Zealand; South Africa

Final positions
- Champions: New Zealand (15th title)
- Bledisloe Cup: New Zealand
- Freedom Cup: New Zealand
- Mandela Challenge Plate: Australia
- Puma Trophy: Australia

Tournament statistics
- Matches played: 12
- Tries scored: 87 (7.25 per match)
- Attendance: 367,318 (30,610 per match)
- Top scorer(s): (Australia) Bernard Foley (80)
- Most tries: (Australia) Israel Folau (5) (New Zealand) Rieko Ioane (5)

The 2017 Rugby Championship was the sixth edition of the expanded annual southern hemisphere Rugby Championship, featuring Argentina, Australia, South Africa and New Zealand. The competition is operated by SANZAAR, a joint venture of the four countries' national unions.

The tournament started on 19 August with Australia hosting reigning champions New Zealand and South Africa hosting Argentina. The tournament ran for eight weeks with two bye weeks, ending on 7 October when New Zealand visited South Africa and Australia played in Argentina.

== Background ==
The tournament is operated by SANZAAR and known for sponsorship reasons as The Castle Rugby Championship in South Africa, The Investec Rugby Championship in New Zealand, The Castrol Edge Rugby Championship in Australia and The Personal Rugby Championship in Argentina.

== Format ==
The format for the 2017 tournament was similar to that of previous editions. Each side played the other once at home, and once away, giving a total of six matches each, and twelve in total. A win earned a team four league points, a draw two league points, and a loss by eight or more points zero league points. A bonus point was earned in one of two ways: by scoring at least three tries more than the opponent in a match, or by losing within seven points. The competition winner was the side with the most points at the end of the tournament.

== Table ==
Place	Nation	Games				Points			Try Bonus	Losing Bonus	Table points
Place	Nation	Played	Won	Drawn	Lost	For	Against	Diff	Try Bonus	Losing Bonus	Table points
1	New Zealand	6	6	0	0	246	119	+127	4	0	28
2	Australia	6	2	2	2	195	179	+16	2	1	15
3	South Africa	6	2	2	2	152	170	–18	1	1	14
4	Argentina	6	0	0	6	110	235	–125	0	0	0

== Results ==
=== Round 1 ===
19 August 2017
20:00 AEST (UTC+10)

Australia	34–54	New Zealand (1 BP)
Try: Rona 51' c Kuridrani 54' c Beale 60' c Folau 68' c Con: Foley (4/4) 52', 55', 61', 68'; Pen: Foley (2/2) 4', 15'	Report	Try: Squire 9' c Ioane (2) 17' m, 20' c Crotty (2) 24' c, 40' c Williams 33' c McKenzie 42' c B. Smith 47' c Con: B. Barrett (7/8) 11', 21', 25', 34', 40', 44', 48'

Stadium Australia, Sydney
Attendance: 54,846
Referee: Wayne Barnes (England)

FB	15	Israel Folau
RW	14	Henry Speight
OC	13	Samu Kerevi	(substituted off) 40'
IC	12	Kurtley Beale
LW	11	Curtis Rona	(substituted off) 67'
FH	10	Bernard Foley
SH	9	Will Genia	(substituted off) 49'
N8	8	Sean McMahon	(substituted off) 63'
OF	7	Michael Hooper (c)
BF	6	Ned Hanigan
RL	5	Adam Coleman
LL	4	Rory Arnold	(substituted off) 49'
TP	3	Allan Alaalatoa	(substituted off) 50'
HK	2	Stephen Moore	(substituted off) 40'
LP	1	Scott Sio	(substituted off) 60'
Replacements:
HK	16	Tatafu Polota-Nau	(substituted on) 40'
PR	17	Tom Robertson	(substituted on) 60'
PR	18	Sekope Kepu	(substituted on) 50'
LK	19	Rob Simmons	(substituted on) 49'
N8	20	Lopeti Timani	(substituted on) 63'
SH	21	Nick Phipps	(substituted on) 49'
CE	22	Reece Hodge	(substituted on) 67'
CE	23	Tevita Kuridrani	(substituted on) 40'
Coach:
(Australia) Michael Cheika

FB	15	Damian McKenzie	(substituted off) 66'
RW	14	Ben Smith
OC	13	Ryan Crotty	(substituted off) 49'
IC	12	Sonny Bill Williams
LW	11	Rieko Ioane
FH	10	Beauden Barrett
SH	9	Aaron Smith	(substituted off) 52'
N8	8	Kieran Read (c)
OF	7	Sam Cane
BF	6	Liam Squire	(substituted off) 62'
RL	5	Sam Whitelock	(substituted off) 60'
LL	4	Brodie Retallick
TP	3	Owen Franks	(substituted off) 43'
HK	2	Codie Taylor	(substituted off) 66'
LP	1	Joe Moody	(substituted off) 50'	(substituted on) 64'
Replacements:
HK	16	Nathan Harris	(substituted on) 66'
PR	17	Wyatt Crockett	(substituted on) 50'	(substituted off) 64'
PR	18	Ofa Tu'ungafasi	(substituted on) 43'
LK	19	Luke Romano	(substituted on) 60'
FL	20	Ardie Savea	(substituted on) 62'
SH	21	TJ Perenara	(substituted on) 52'
FH	22	Lima Sopoaga	(substituted on) 66'
CE	23	Anton Lienert-Brown	(substituted on) 49'
Coach:
(New Zealand) Steve Hansen

Man of the Match:
Ryan Crotty (New Zealand)

Touch judges:
Nigel Owens (Wales)
Andrew Brace (Ireland)
Television match official:
Rowan Kitt (England)

Notes:

- Curtis Rona (Australia) made his international debut.
- The combined score of 88 was the highest combined score in The Rugby Championship and surpassed the previous high of 86 achieved by South Africa and Argentina in 2013.
- New Zealand's 54 points was the most they have ever scored against Australia in a test match.

19 August 2017
17:05 SAST (UTC+02)

South Africa	37–15	Argentina
Try: Skosan 36' c Rhule 51' c Kolisi 65' c Du Toit 71' c Con: Jantjies (4/4) 37', 53', 66', 73'; Pen: Jantjies (3/3) 11', 19', 48'	Report	Try: Landajo 31' m Boffelli 58' c Con: Hernández (1/1) 59'; Pen: Sánchez (1/2) 44'

Nelson Mandela Bay Stadium, Port Elizabeth
Attendance: 42,513
Referee: Romain Poite (France)

FB	15	Andries Coetzee
RW	14	Raymond Rhule
OC	13	Jesse Kriel
IC	12	Jan Serfontein	(substituted off) 72'
LW	11	Courtnall Skosan
FH	10	Elton Jantjies	(substituted off) 76'
SH	9	Ross Cronjé	(substituted off) 62'
N8	8	Uzair Cassiem
OF	7	Jaco Kriel	(substituted off) 59'
BF	6	Siya Kolisi
RL	5	Franco Mostert	(substituted off) 59'
LL	4	Eben Etzebeth (c)
TP	3	Coenie Oosthuizen	(substituted off) 72'
HK	2	Malcolm Marx	(substituted off) 72'
LP	1	Tendai Mtawarira	(substituted off) 55'
Replacements:
HK	16	Bongi Mbonambi	(substituted on) 72'
PR	17	Steven Kitshoff	(substituted on) 55'
PR	18	Trevor Nyakane	(substituted on) 72'
LK	19	Pieter-Steph du Toit	(substituted on) 59'
FL	20	Jean-Luc du Preez	(substituted on) 59'
SH	21	Francois Hougaard	(substituted on) 62'
FH	22	Curwin Bosch	(substituted on) 76'
CE	23	Damian de Allende	(substituted on) 72'
Coach:
(South Africa) Allister Coetzee

FB	15	Joaquín Tuculet
RW	14	Ramiro Moyano
OC	13	Matías Orlando	(substituted off) 55'
IC	12	Jerónimo de la Fuente
LW	11	Emiliano Boffelli
FH	10	Nicolás Sánchez	(substituted off) 53'
SH	9	Martín Landajo	(substituted off) 56'
N8	8	Leonardo Senatore	(substituted off) 13'
OF	7	Tomás Lezana
BF	6	Pablo Matera
RL	5	Tomás Lavanini	(substituted off) 69'
LL	4	Guido Petti	(substituted off) 53'
TP	3	Enrique Pieretto
HK	2	Agustín Creevy (c)	(substituted off) 60'
LP	1	Nahuel Tetaz Chaparro	(substituted off) 67'
Replacements:
HK	16	Julián Montoya	(substituted on) 60'
PR	17	Lucas Noguera Paz	(substituted on) 67'
PR	18	Ramiro Herrera	(substituted on) 53'
LK	19	Marcos Kremer	(substituted on) 69'
FL	20	Javier Ortega Desio	(substituted on) 13'
SH	21	Tomás Cubelli	(substituted on) 56'
CE	22	Juan Martín Hernández	(substituted on) 53'
CE	23	Matías Moroni	(substituted on) 55'
Coach:
(Argentina) Daniel Hourcade

Man of the Match:
Coenie Oosthuizen (South Africa)

Touch judges:
Pascal Gaüzère (France)
Nic Berry (Australia)
Television match official:
Glenn Newman (New Zealand)

Notes:

- Curwin Bosch (South Africa) made his international debut.
- Tendai Mtawarira (South Africa) earned his thirtieth consecutive Rugby Championship cap, breaking the record previously held by Bryan Habana (South Africa).

=== Round 2 ===
26 August 2017
19:35 NZST (UTC+12)

New Zealand	35–29	Australia (1 BP)
Try: Ioane 21 c A. Smith 40' c B. Barrett (2) 60' c, 77' c B. Smith 70' c Con: B. Barrett (5/5) 22', 40', 62', 72', 78'	Report	Try: Folau 1' m Hooper 10' c Foley 14' m Genia 66' m Beale 76' c Con: Foley (2/5) 11', 76'

Forsyth Barr Stadium, Dunedin
Attendance: 27,085
Referee: Nigel Owens (Wales)

FB	15	Damian McKenzie
RW	14	Ben Smith
OC	13	Ryan Crotty	(substituted off) 27'	(substituted on) 39'		(substituted off) 67'
IC	12	Sonny Bill Williams			(substituted off) 62'	(substituted on) 67'	(substituted off) 73'
LW	11	Rieko Ioane
FH	10	Beauden Barrett	(substituted off) 45'	(substituted on) 54'
SH	9	Aaron Smith	(substituted off) 67'
N8	8	Kieran Read (c)
OF	7	Sam Cane	(substituted off) 11'
BF	6	Liam Squire	(substituted off) 76'
RL	5	Sam Whitelock
LL	4	Brodie Retallick
TP	3	Nepo Laulala	(substituted off) 62'
HK	2	Dane Coles	(substituted off) 67'
LP	1	Joe Moody	(substituted off) 67'
Replacements:
HK	16	Codie Taylor	(substituted on) 67'
PR	17	Kane Hames	(substituted on) 67'
PR	18	Ofa Tu'ungafasi	(substituted on) 62'
LK	19	Scott Barrett	(substituted on) 76'
FL	20	Ardie Savea	(substituted on) 11'
SH	21	TJ Perenara	(substituted on) 67'
FH	22	Lima Sopoaga	(substituted on) 45'	(substituted off) 54'			(substituted on) 73'
CE	23	Anton Lienert-Brown	(substituted on) 27'	(substituted off) 39'	(substituted on) 62'
Coach:
(New Zealand) Steve Hansen

FB	15	Israel Folau
RW	14	Dane Haylett-Petty	(substituted off) 62'
OC	13	Tevita Kuridrani
IC	12	Kurtley Beale
LW	11	Henry Speight
FH	10	Bernard Foley
SH	9	Will Genia
N8	8	Sean McMahon
OF	7	Michael Hooper (c)
BF	6	Ned Hanigan	(substituted off) 62'
RL	5	Rory Arnold
LL	4	Rob Simmons	(substituted off) 64'
TP	3	Allan Alaalatoa	(substituted off) 40'
HK	2	Stephen Moore	(substituted off) 38'
LP	1	Scott Sio	(substituted off) 63'
Replacements:
HK	16	Tatafu Polota-Nau	(substituted on) 38'
PR	17	Tom Robertson	(substituted on) 63'
PR	18	Sekope Kepu	(substituted on) 40'
LK	19	Izack Rodda	(substituted on) 64'
N8	20	Lopeti Timani	(substituted on) 62'
SH	21	Nick Phipps
CE	22	Reece Hodge	(substituted on) 62'
WG	23	Curtis Rona
Coach:
(Australia) Michael Cheika

Man of the Match:
Rieko Ioane (New Zealand)

Touch judges:
Wayne Barnes (England)
Andrew Brace (Ireland)
Television match official:
Rowan Kitt (England)

Notes:

- Dane Coles (New Zealand) earned his 50th test cap.
- Izack Rodda (Australia) made his international debut.
- New Zealand retain the Bledisloe Cup.

26 August 2017
16:30 AST (UTC-03)

Argentina	23–41	South Africa (1 BP)
Try: Moyano 27' c Moroni 58' c Con: Hernández (1/1) 28'; Sánchez (1/1) 59'; Pen: Boffelli (2/2) 3', 60'; Hernández (1/1) 43'	Report	Try: Kolisi (2) 19' c, 48' c Jantjies 38' c Penalty try 56' du Preez 77' c Con: Jantjies (4/4) 20', 38', 48', 79'; Pen: Jantjies (2/4) 27', 71'

Estadio Padre Ernesto Martearena, Salta
Attendance: 17,435
Referee: Pascal Gaüzère (France)

FB	15	Joaquín Tuculet
RW	14	Ramiro Moyano		(substituted off) 56'
OC	13	Matías Orlando
IC	12	Jerónimo de la Fuente
LW	11	Emiliano Boffelli
FH	10	Juan Martín Hernández		(substituted off) 56'
SH	9	Tomás Cubelli		(substituted off) 56'
N8	8	Juan Manuel Leguizamón	(yellow card) 37' to 47'
OF	7	Tomás Lezana		(substituted off) 49'
BF	6	Pablo Matera		(substituted off) 57'
RL	5	Tomás Lavanini	(yellow card) 56' (red card)
LL	4	Matías Alemanno
TP	3	Ramiro Herrera		(substituted off) 49'
HK	2	Agustín Creevy (c)		(substituted off) 56'
LP	1	Lucas Noguera Paz
Replacements:
HK	16	Julián Montoya		(substituted on) 56'
PR	17	Santiago García Botta
PR	18	Enrique Pieretto		(substituted on) 49'
LK	19	Marcos Kremer		(substituted on) 57'
FL	20	Javier Ortega Desio		(substituted on) 49'
SH	21	Martín Landajo		(substituted on) 56'
FH	22	Nicolás Sánchez		(substituted on) 56'
CE	23	Matías Moroni		(substituted on) 56'
Coach:
(Argentina) Daniel Hourcade

FB	15	Andries Coetzee	(yellow card) 59' to 69'
RW	14	Raymond Rhule
OC	13	Jesse Kriel
IC	12	Jan Serfontein		(substituted off) 71'
LW	11	Courtnall Skosan
FH	10	Elton Jantjies
SH	9	Francois Hougaard		(substituted off) 56'
N8	8	Uzair Cassiem		(substituted off) 51'
OF	7	Jaco Kriel
BF	6	Siya Kolisi
RL	5	Franco Mostert		(substituted off) 51'
LL	4	Eben Etzebeth (c)
TP	3	Coenie Oosthuizen		(substituted off) 53'
HK	2	Malcolm Marx		(substituted off) 76'
LP	1	Tendai Mtawarira		(substituted off) 51'
Replacements:
HK	16	Bongi Mbonambi		(substituted on) 76'
PR	17	Steven Kitshoff		(substituted on) 51'
PR	18	Trevor Nyakane		(substituted on) 53'
LK	19	Pieter-Steph du Toit		(substituted on) 51'
FL	20	Jean-Luc du Preez		(substituted on) 51'
SH	21	Rudy Paige		(substituted on) 56'
FH	22	Curwin Bosch
CE	23	Damian de Allende		(substituted on) 71'
Coach:
(South Africa) Allister Coetzee

Man of the Match:
Siya Kolisi (South Africa)

Touch judges:
Romain Poite (France)
Nic Berry (Australia)
Television match official:
Glenn Newman (New Zealand)

Notes:

- South Africa earn their first Rugby Championship bonus point victory in Argentina.

=== Round 3 ===
9 September 2017
19:35 NZST (UTC+12)

(1 BP) New Zealand	39–22	Argentina
Try: Milner-Skudder 7' m Lienert-Brown 17' m Dagg 36' m Fifita 50' c McKenzie 62' c B. Barrett 77' c Con: Sopoaga (3/3) 52', 64', 79'; Pen: Sopoaga (1/2) 69'	Report	Try: Sánchez 40' c Con: Sánchez (1/1) 40'; Pen: Sánchez (2/3) 13', 49'; Boffelli (2/2) 24', 42'; Drop: Sánchez (1/1) 28'

Yarrow Stadium, New Plymouth
Attendance: 22,118
Referee: Angus Gardner (Australia)

FB	15	Damian McKenzie
RW	14	Israel Dagg		(substituted off) 49'
OC	13	Anton Lienert-Brown
IC	12	Sonny Bill Williams		(substituted off) 75'
LW	11	Nehe Milner-Skudder
FH	10	Beauden Barrett	(yellow card) 49' to 59'
SH	9	TJ Perenara		(substituted off) 64'
N8	8	Kieran Read (c)
OF	7	Ardie Savea		(substituted off) 43'
BF	6	Vaea Fifita
RL	5	Brodie Retallick
LL	4	Luke Romano		(substituted off) 52'
TP	3	Nepo Laulala		(substituted off) 67'
HK	2	Dane Coles		(substituted off) 67'
LP	1	Joe Moody		(substituted off) 64'
Replacements:
HK	16	Codie Taylor		(substituted on) 67'
PR	17	Wyatt Crockett		(substituted on) 64'
PR	18	Ofa Tu'ungafasi		(substituted on) 67'
LK	19	Scott Barrett		(substituted on) 52'
FL	20	Sam Cane		(substituted on) 43'
SH	21	Tawera Kerr-Barlow		(substituted on) 64'
FH	22	Lima Sopoaga		(substituted on) 49'
CE	23	Ngani Laumape		(substituted on) 75'
Coach:
(New Zealand) Steve Hansen

FB	15	Joaquín Tuculet
RW	14	Santiago Cordero			(substituted off) 67'
OC	13	Matías Moroni	(substituted off) 38'	(substituted on) 40'
IC	12	Jerónimo de la Fuente	(substituted off) 69'
LW	11	Emiliano Boffelli
FH	10	Nicolás Sánchez
SH	9	Tomás Cubelli	(substituted off) 64'
N8	8	Benjamín Macome	(substituted off) 60'
OF	7	Javier Ortega Desio
BF	6	Pablo Matera
RL	5	Matías Alemanno	(substituted off) 60'
LL	4	Guido Petti
TP	3	Nahuel Tetaz Chaparro	(substituted off) 64'
HK	2	Agustín Creevy (c)	(substituted off) 64'
LP	1	Lucas Noguera Paz	(substituted off) 69'
Replacements:
HK	16	Julián Montoya	(substituted on) 64'
PR	17	Santiago García Botta	(substituted on) 69'
PR	18	Enrique Pieretto	(substituted on) 64'
LK	19	Marcos Kremer	(substituted on) 60'
FL	20	Tomás Lezana	(substituted on) 60'
SH	21	Martín Landajo	(substituted on) 64'
FH	22	Santiago González Iglesias	(substituted on) 69'
CE	23	Matías Orlando	(substituted on) 38'	(substituted off) 40'	(substituted on) 67'
Coach:
(Argentina) Daniel Hourcade

Man of the Match:
Vaea Fifita (New Zealand)

Touch judges:
Nigel Owens (Wales)
Matthew Carley (England)
Television match official:
George Ayoub (Australia)

9 September 2017
18:00 AWST (UTC+08)

Australia	23–23	South Africa
Try: Beale 26' c Polota-Nau 46' c Con: Foley (2/2) 28', 47'; Pen: Foley (3/3) 7', 40', 69'	Report	Try: Je. Kriel 24' c Marx 58' c Con: Jantjies (2/2) 26', 59'; Pen: Jantjies (3/3) 3', 53', 67'

Perth Oval, Perth
Attendance: 17,528
Referee: Glen Jackson (New Zealand)

FB	15	Israel Folau
RW	14	Henry Speight	(substituted off) 69'
OC	13	Tevita Kuridrani	(substituted off) 75'
IC	12	Kurtley Beale
LW	11	Reece Hodge
FH	10	Bernard Foley
SH	9	Will Genia	(substituted off) 70'
N8	8	Sean McMahon	(substituted off) 61'
OF	7	Michael Hooper (c)
BF	6	Ned Hanigan
RL	5	Adam Coleman
LL	4	Rory Arnold	(substituted off) 57'
TP	3	Sekope Kepu	(substituted off) 61'
HK	2	Tatafu Polota-Nau	(substituted off) 17'	(substituted on) 26'	(substituted off) 69'
LP	1	Scott Sio	(substituted off) 67'
Replacements:
HK	16	Jordan Uelese	(substituted on) 17'	(substituted off) 26'	(substituted on) 69'
PR	17	Tom Robertson	(substituted on) 67'
PR	18	Allan Alaalatoa	(substituted on) 61'
LK	19	Rob Simmons	(substituted on) 57'
FL	20	Jack Dempsey	(substituted on) 61'
SH	21	Nick Phipps	(substituted on) 70'
CE	22	Samu Kerevi	(substituted on) 75'
WG	23	Curtis Rona	(substituted on) 69'
Coach:
(Australia) Michael Cheika

FB	15	Andries Coetzee
RW	14	Raymond Rhule
OC	13	Jesse Kriel
IC	12	Jan Serfontein
LW	11	Courtnall Skosan
FH	10	Elton Jantjies
SH	9	Ross Cronjé	(substituted off) 65'
N8	8	Uzair Cassiem	(substituted off) 54'
OF	7	Jaco Kriel
BF	6	Siya Kolisi
RL	5	Pieter-Steph du Toit	(substituted off) 65'
LL	4	Eben Etzebeth (c)
TP	3	Coenie Oosthuizen	(substituted off) 69'	(substituted on) 75'
HK	2	Malcolm Marx
LP	1	Tendai Mtawarira	(substituted off) 54'
Replacements:
HK	16	Bongi Mbonambi
PR	17	Steven Kitshoff	(substituted on) 54'
PR	18	Trevor Nyakane	(substituted on) 69'	(substituted off) 75'
LK	19	Lood de Jager	(substituted on) 65'
FL	20	Jean-Luc du Preez	(substituted on) 54'
SH	21	Francois Hougaard	(substituted on) 65'
FH	22	Handré Pollard
CE	23	Damian de Allende
Coach:
(South Africa) Allister Coetzee

Man of the Match:
Kurtley Beale (Australia)

Touch judges:
John Lacey (Ireland)
Paul Williams (New Zealand)
Television match official:
Ben Skeen (New Zealand)

Notes:

- Jordan Uelese (Australia) made his international debut.
- Tevita Kuridrani (Australia) earned his 50th test cap.
- This was the first draw between Australia and South Africa since their 14–14 draw in 2001.

=== Round 4 ===
16 September 2017
19:35 NZST (UTC+12)

(1 BP) New Zealand	57–0	South Africa
Try: Ioane 16' c Milner-Skudder (2) 20' c, 52' m S. Barrett 33' c Retallick 36' c Tu'ungafasi 63' c Sopoaga 73' c Taylor 80' c Con: B. Barrett (7/8) 18', 21', 35', 37', 64', 74', 80'; Pen: B. Barrett (1/1) 13'	Report

North Harbour Stadium, Albany
Attendance: 30,021
Referee: Nigel Owens (Wales)

FB	15	Damian McKenzie
RW	14	Nehe Milner-Skudder	(substituted off) 53'
OC	13	Ryan Crotty
IC	12	Sonny Bill Williams	(substituted off) 53'
LW	11	Rieko Ioane
FH	10	Beauden Barrett
SH	9	Aaron Smith	(substituted off) 57'
N8	8	Kieran Read (c)
OF	7	Sam Cane	(substituted off) 57'
BF	6	Liam Squire	(substituted off) 27'
RL	5	Sam Whitelock
LL	4	Brodie Retallick
TP	3	Nepo Laulala	(substituted off) 51'
HK	2	Dane Coles	(substituted off) 57'
LP	1	Kane Hames	(substituted off) 42'
Replacements:
HK	16	Codie Taylor	(substituted on) 57'
PR	17	Wyatt Crockett	(substituted on) 42'
PR	18	Ofa Tu'ungafasi	(substituted on) 51'
LK	19	Scott Barrett	(substituted on) 27'
FL	20	Ardie Savea	(substituted on) 57'
SH	21	TJ Perenara	(substituted on) 57'
FH	22	Lima Sopoaga	(substituted on) 53'
CE	23	Anton Lienert-Brown	(substituted on) 53'
Coach:
(New Zealand) Steve Hansen

FB	15	Andries Coetzee
RW	14	Raymond Rhule
OC	13	Jesse Kriel
IC	12	Jan Serfontein	(substituted off) 69'
LW	11	Courtnall Skosan
FH	10	Elton Jantjies	(substituted off) 57'
SH	9	Francois Hougaard	(substituted off) 58'
N8	8	Uzair Cassiem
OF	7	Jean-Luc du Preez	(substituted off) 51'
BF	6	Siya Kolisi
RL	5	Franco Mostert	(substituted off) 44'
LL	4	Eben Etzebeth (c)
TP	3	Ruan Dreyer	(substituted off) 54'
HK	2	Malcolm Marx	(substituted off) 57'
LP	1	Tendai Mtawarira	(substituted off) 44'
Replacements:
HK	16	Bongi Mbonambi	(substituted on) 57'
PR	17	Steven Kitshoff	(substituted on) 44'
PR	18	Trevor Nyakane	(substituted on) 54'
LK	19	Lood de Jager	(substituted on) 44'
LK	20	Pieter-Steph du Toit	(substituted on) 51'
SH	21	Rudy Paige	(substituted on) 58'
FH	22	Handré Pollard	(substituted on) 57'
CE	23	Damian de Allende	(substituted on) 69'
Coach:
(South Africa) Allister Coetzee

Man of the Match:
Nehe Milner-Skudder (New Zealand)

Touch judges:
Angus Gardner (Australia)
Matthew Carley (England)
Television match official:
George Ayoub (Australia)

Notes:

- This is South Africa's biggest defeat in test rugby, surpassing the previous 50 point-margin set in the 2002 game against England.
- This is South Africa's largest-ever losing margin against New Zealand, surpassing the previous 42 point-margin set in the previous game at Durban.
- New Zealand retain the Freedom Cup.

16 September 2017
20:00 AEST (UTC+10)

(1 BP) Australia	45–20	Argentina
Try: Folau (2) 28' c, 54' c Kepu 48' c Genia 71' c Phipps 73' c Uelese 80' c Con: Foley (6/6) 30', 49', 54', 73', 75', 80'; Pen: Foley (1/1) 5'	Report	Try: Landajo 22' c Moroni 77' c Con: Sánchez (2/2) 23', 78'; Pen: Sánchez (2/3) 14', 35'

Canberra Stadium, Canberra
Attendance: 14,229
Referee: John Lacey (Ireland)

FB	15	Israel Folau
RW	14	Henry Speight	(substituted off) 49'
OC	13	Tevita Kuridrani	(substituted off) 64'
IC	12	Kurtley Beale
LW	11	Reece Hodge
FH	10	Bernard Foley
SH	9	Will Genia	(substituted off) 73'
N8	8	Sean McMahon
OF	7	Michael Hooper (c)
BF	6	Ned Hanigan	(substituted off) 59'
RL	5	Adam Coleman
LL	4	Rob Simmons	(substituted off) 54'
TP	3	Sekope Kepu	(substituted off) 64'
HK	2	Tatafu Polota-Nau	(substituted off) 49'	(substituted on) 61'	(substituted off) 73'
LP	1	Scott Sio	(substituted off) 67'
Replacements:
HK	16	Jordan Uelese	(substituted on) 49'	(substituted off) 61'	(substituted on) 73'
PR	17	Tom Robertson	(substituted on) 67'
PR	18	Allan Alaalatoa	(substituted on) 64'
LK	19	Izack Rodda	(substituted on) 54'
FL	20	Jack Dempsey	(substituted on) 59'
SH	21	Nick Phipps	(substituted on) 73'
CE	22	Samu Kerevi	(substituted on) 64'
WG	23	Marika Koroibete	(substituted on) 49'
Coach:
(Australia) Michael Cheika

FB	15	Emiliano Boffelli
RW	14	Matías Moroni
OC	13	Matías Orlando
IC	12	Jerónimo de la Fuente		(substituted off) 73'
LW	11	Ramiro Moyano		(substituted off) 40'
FH	10	Nicolás Sánchez
SH	9	Martín Landajo		(substituted off) 61'
N8	8	Tomás Lezana
OF	7	Javier Ortega Desio			(substituted off) 70'
BF	6	Pablo Matera		(substituted off) 64'
RL	5	Matías Alemanno
LL	4	Guido Petti		(substituted off) 69'
TP	3	Nahuel Tetaz Chaparro		(substituted off) 64'	(substituted on) 70'
HK	2	Agustín Creevy (c)		(substituted off) 61'
LP	1	Lucas Noguera Paz		(substituted off) 73'
Replacements:
HK	16	Julián Montoya		(substituted on) 61'
PR	17	Santiago García Botta		(substituted on) 73'
PR	18	Enrique Pieretto	(yellow card) 72' to 80'	(substituted on) 64'
LK	19	Marcos Kremer		(substituted on) 69'
FL	20	Juan Manuel Leguizamón		(substituted on) 64'
SH	21	Tomás Cubelli		(substituted on) 61'
FH	22	Santiago González Iglesias		(substituted on) 73'
WG	23	Manuel Montero		(substituted on) 40'
Coach:
(Argentina) Daniel Hourcade

Man of the Match:
Bernard Foley (Australia)

Touch judges:
Glen Jackson (New Zealand)
Paul Williams (New Zealand)
Television match official:
Ben Skeen (New Zealand)

Notes:

- Marika Koroibete (Australia) made his international debut.

=== Round 5 ===
30 September 2017
17:05 SAST (UTC+02)

South Africa	27–27	Australia
Try: Dreyer 17' c Serfontein 42' c Skosan 48' c Con: Jantjies (3/3) 17', 43', 50'; Pen: Jantjies (2/3) 25', 69'	Report	Try: Folau 10' c Koroibete (2) 45' c, 55' c Con: Foley (3/3) 11', 46', 57'; Pen: Foley (2/2) 22', 34'

Free State Stadium, Bloemfontein
Attendance: 33,805
Referee: Ben O'Keeffe (New Zealand)

FB	15	Andries Coetzee
RW	14	Dillyn Leyds
OC	13	Jesse Kriel
IC	12	Jan Serfontein	(substituted off) 69'
LW	11	Courtnall Skosan
FH	10	Elton Jantjies
SH	9	Ross Cronjé	(substituted off) 74'
N8	8	Uzair Cassiem	(substituted off) 18'
OF	7	Francois Louw	(substituted off) 65'
BF	6	Siya Kolisi
RL	5	Franco Mostert
LL	4	Eben Etzebeth (c)
TP	3	Ruan Dreyer	(substituted off) 57'
HK	2	Malcolm Marx
LP	1	Tendai Mtawarira	(substituted off) 57'
Replacements:
HK	16	Chiliboy Ralepelle
PR	17	Steven Kitshoff	(substituted on) 57'
PR	18	Trevor Nyakane	(substituted on) 57'
LK	19	Pieter-Steph du Toit	(substituted on) 65'
FL	20	Jean-Luc du Preez	(substituted on) 18'
SH	21	Rudy Paige	(substituted on) 74'
FH	22	Handré Pollard
CE	23	Damian de Allende	(substituted on) 69'
Coach:
(South Africa) Allister Coetzee

FB	15	Israel Folau
RW	14	Marika Koroibete
OC	13	Tevita Kuridrani
IC	12	Kurtley Beale	(substituted off) 74'
LW	11	Reece Hodge
FH	10	Bernard Foley
SH	9	Will Genia	(substituted off) 75'
N8	8	Sean McMahon
OF	7	Michael Hooper (c)
BF	6	Jack Dempsey	(substituted off) 52'
RL	5	Adam Coleman	(substituted off) 61'
LL	4	Izack Rodda	(substituted off) 46'
TP	3	Sekope Kepu	(substituted off) 61'
HK	2	Tatafu Polota-Nau	(substituted off) 61'
LP	1	Scott Sio	(substituted off) 69'
Replacements:
HK	16	Stephen Moore	(substituted on) 61'
PR	17	Tom Robertson	(substituted on) 69'
PR	18	Allan Alaalatoa	(substituted on) 61'
LK	19	Rob Simmons	(substituted on) 46'
FL	20	Ned Hanigan	(substituted on) 52'
LK	21	Lukhan Tui	(substituted on) 61'
SH	22	Nick Phipps	(substituted on) 75'
CE	23	Samu Kerevi	(substituted on) 74'
Coach:
(Australia) Michael Cheika

Man of the Match:
Kurtley Beale (Australia)

Touch judges:
Jérôme Garcès (France)
Shuhei Kubo (Japan)
Television match official:
Rowan Kitt (England)

Notes:

- Bernard Foley (Australia) earned his 50th test cap.
- Lukhan Tui (Australia) made his international debut.
- Australia retain the Mandela Challenge Plate.
- This marks the first time that Australia avoided defeat on South African soil in the Rugby Championship.

30 September 2017
19:30 AST (UTC-03)

Argentina	10–36	New Zealand (1 BP)
Try: Leguizamón 52' c Con: Sánchez (1/1) 54'; Pen: Sánchez (1/1) 4'	Report	Try: Read (2) 6' m, 26' c McKenzie 15' c Naholo 19' c Havili 80' c Con: B. Barrett (4/5) 16', 20', 27', 80'; Pen: B. Barrett (1/1) 3'

José Amalfitani Stadium, Buenos Aires
Attendance: 30,140
Referee: Jaco Peyper (South Africa)

FB	15	Joaquín Tuculet
RW	14	Matías Moroni
OC	13	Matías Orlando		(substituted off) 57'
IC	12	Jerónimo de la Fuente
LW	11	Emiliano Boffelli
FH	10	Nicolás Sánchez		(substituted off) 54'
SH	9	Tomás Cubelli		(substituted off) 32'
N8	8	Juan Manuel Leguizamón
OF	7	Tomás Lezana			(substituted off) 69'	(substituted on) 77'
BF	6	Pablo Matera		(substituted off) 50'
RL	5	Tomás Lavanini	(yellow card) 21' to 31'	(substituted off) 50'	(substituted on) 79'
LL	4	Guido Petti			(substituted off) 79'
TP	3	Nahuel Tetaz Chaparro		(substituted off) 42'	(substituted on) 69'	(substituted off) 77'
HK	2	Agustín Creevy (c)		(substituted off) 59'
LP	1	Lucas Noguera Paz		(substituted off) 54'
Replacements:
HK	16	Julián Montoya		(substituted on) 59'
PR	17	Santiago García Botta		(substituted on) 54'
PR	18	Ramiro Herrera	(yellow card) 66' to 76'	(substituted on) 42'
LK	19	Marcos Kremer		(substituted on) 50'
FL	20	Javier Ortega Desio		(substituted on) 50'
SH	21	Martín Landajo		(substituted on) 32'
CE	22	Juan Martín Hernández		(substituted on) 54'
WG	23	Santiago Cordero		(substituted on) 57'
Coach:
(Argentina) Daniel Hourcade

FB	15	Damian McKenzie
RW	14	Waisake Naholo
OC	13	Anton Lienert-Brown
IC	12	Sonny Bill Williams		(substituted off) 61'
LW	11	Rieko Ioane		(substituted off) 69'
FH	10	Beauden Barrett
SH	9	Aaron Smith		(substituted off) 50'
N8	8	Kieran Read (c)	(yellow card) 50' to 60'
OF	7	Matt Todd	(yellow card) 37' to 47'	(substituted off) 65'
BF	6	Vaea Fifita		(substituted off) 65'
RL	5	Scott Barrett
LL	4	Luke Romano
TP	3	Nepo Laulala		(substituted off) 50'
HK	2	Dane Coles		(substituted off) 54'
LP	1	Kane Hames		(substituted off) 46'
Replacements:
HK	16	Codie Taylor		(substituted on) 54'
PR	17	Wyatt Crockett		(substituted on) 46'
PR	18	Ofa Tu'ungafasi		(substituted on) 50'
LK	19	Patrick Tuipulotu		(substituted on) 65'
FL	20	Ardie Savea		(substituted on) 65'
SH	21	TJ Perenara		(substituted on) 50'
CE	22	Ngani Laumape		(substituted on) 61'
CE	23	David Havili		(substituted on) 69'
Coach:
(New Zealand) Steve Hansen

Man of the Match:
Damian McKenzie (New Zealand)

Touch judges:
Mathieu Raynal (France)
Marius van der Westhuizen (South Africa)
Television match official:
Marius Jonker (South Africa)

Notes:

- David Havili (New Zealand) made his international debut.

=== Round 6 ===
7 October 2017
17:05 SAST (UTC+02)

(1 BP) South Africa	24–25	New Zealand
Try: Cronjé 44' c Du Preez 63' c Marx 77' c Con: Jantjies (2/2) 44', 78'; Pollard (1/1) 65'; Pen: Jantjies (1/2) 9'	Report	Try: Crotty 31' m Ioane 58' c McKenzie 68' c Con: Sopoaga (2/2) 59', 70'; Pen: B. Barrett (1/1) 11'; Sopoaga (1/2) 75'

Newlands Stadium, Cape Town
Attendance: 47,342
Referee: Jérôme Garcès (France)

FB	15	Andries Coetzee
RW	14	Dillyn Leyds
OC	13	Jesse Kriel
IC	12	Jan Serfontein		(substituted off) 61'
LW	11	Courtnall Skosan
FH	10	Elton Jantjies		(substituted off) 54'	(substituted on) 70'
SH	9	Ross Cronjé
N8	8	Francois Louw
OF	7	Pieter-Steph du Toit
BF	6	Siya Kolisi		(substituted off) 54'
RL	5	Lood de Jager		(substituted off) 54'	(substituted on) 75'
LL	4	Eben Etzebeth (c)			(substituted off) 75'
TP	3	Ruan Dreyer		(substituted off) 50'
HK	2	Malcolm Marx
LP	1	Steven Kitshoff		(substituted off) 77'
Replacements:
HK	16	Chiliboy Ralepelle
PR	17	Trevor Nyakane		(substituted on) 77'
PR	18	Wilco Louw		(substituted on) 50'
LK	19	Franco Mostert		(substituted on) 54'
FL	20	Jean-Luc du Preez		(substituted on) 54'
SH	21	Rudy Paige
FH	22	Handré Pollard		(substituted on) 54'	(substituted off) 70'
CE	23	Damian de Allende	(red card) 75'	(substituted on) 61'
Coach:
(South Africa) Allister Coetzee

FB	15	Damian McKenzie
RW	14	Nehe Milner-Skudder	(substituted off) 40+7'
OC	13	Ryan Crotty
IC	12	Sonny Bill Williams
LW	11	Rieko Ioane
FH	10	Beauden Barrett	(substituted off) 32'
SH	9	Aaron Smith	(substituted off) 59'
N8	8	Kieran Read (c)
OF	7	Sam Cane	(substituted off) 46'
BF	6	Liam Squire
RL	5	Scott Barrett	(substituted off) 65'
LL	4	Sam Whitelock
TP	3	Nepo Laulala	(substituted off) 45'
HK	2	Dane Coles	(substituted off) 45'
LP	1	Kane Hames	(substituted off) 45'
Replacements:
HK	16	Codie Taylor	(substituted on) 45'
PR	17	Wyatt Crockett	(substituted on) 45'
PR	18	Ofa Tu'ungafasi	(substituted on) 45'
LK	19	Patrick Tuipulotu	(substituted on) 65'
FL	20	Matt Todd	(substituted on) 46'
SH	21	Tawera Kerr-Barlow	(substituted on) 59'
FH	22	Lima Sopoaga	(substituted on) 32'
CE	23	David Havili	(substituted on) 40+7'
Coach:
(New Zealand) Steve Hansen

Man of the Match:
Damian McKenzie (New Zealand)

Touch judges:
Romain Poite (France)
Shuhei Kubo (Japan)
Television match official:
Rowan Kitt (England)

Notes:

- Wilco Louw (South Africa) made his international debut.
- The test was preceded by a celebrity tag rugby match during which runner Wayde van Niekerk suffered a career-threatening injury.

7 October 2017
19:30 AST (UTC-03)

Argentina	20–37	Australia (1 BP)
Try: Alemanno 24' c González Iglesias 56' c Con: Sánchez (2/2) 25', 57'; Pen: Sánchez (2/2) 29', 37'	Report	Try: Koroibete 19' m Hodge (2) 33' m, 76' c Foley 51' c Genia 60' c Con: Foley (3/5) 52', 62', 78'; Pen: Foley (2/5) 14', 70'

Estadio Malvinas Argentinas, Mendoza
Attendance: 30,256
Referee: Mathieu Raynal (France)

FB	15	Joaquín Tuculet		(substituted off) 59'
RW	14	Matías Moroni
OC	13	Matías Orlando
IC	12	Santiago González Iglesias
LW	11	Emiliano Boffelli
FH	10	Nicolás Sánchez		(substituted off) 64'
SH	9	Martín Landajo		(substituted off) 78'
N8	8	Tomás Lezana		(substituted off) 58'
OF	7	Javier Ortega Desio		(substituted off) 53'
BF	6	Pablo Matera
RL	5	Matías Alemanno
LL	4	Marcos Kremer	(yellow card) 69' to 79'
TP	3	Nahuel Tetaz Chaparro		(substituted off) 40'
HK	2	Agustín Creevy (c)		(substituted off) 67'
LP	1	Lucas Noguera Paz		(substituted off) 64'
Replacements:
HK	16	Julián Montoya		(substituted on) 67'
PR	17	Santiago García Botta		(substituted on) 64'
PR	18	Enrique Pieretto		(substituted on) 40'
N8	19	Benjamín Macome		(substituted on) 58'
N8	20	Leonardo Senatore		(substituted on) 53'
SH	21	Gonzalo Bertranou		(substituted on) 78'
CE	22	Juan Martín Hernández		(substituted on) 64'
WG	23	Santiago Cordero		(substituted on) 59'
Coach:
(Argentina) Daniel Hourcade

FB	15	Israel Folau
RW	14	Marika Koroibete	(substituted off) 73'
OC	13	Tevita Kuridrani
IC	12	Kurtley Beale	(substituted off) 67'
LW	11	Reece Hodge
FH	10	Bernard Foley
SH	9	Will Genia	(substituted off) 73'
N8	8	Sean McMahon	(substituted off) 64'
OF	7	Michael Hooper (c)
BF	6	Jack Dempsey
RL	5	Adam Coleman
LL	4	Izack Rodda	(substituted off) 54'
TP	3	Sekope Kepu	(substituted off) 53'
HK	2	Tatafu Polota-Nau	(substituted off) 64'
LP	1	Scott Sio	(substituted off) 64'
Replacements:
HK	16	Stephen Moore	(substituted on) 64'
PR	17	Tetera Faulkner	(substituted on) 64'
PR	18	Allan Alaalatoa	(substituted on) 53'
LK	19	Rob Simmons	(substituted on) 54'
LK	20	Lukhan Tui	(substituted on) 64'
SH	21	Nick Phipps	(substituted on) 73'
CE	22	Samu Kerevi	(substituted on) 67'
WG	23	Henry Speight	(substituted on) 73'
Coach:
(Australia) Michael Cheika

Man of the Match:
Reece Hodge (Australia)

Touch judges:
Jaco Peyper (South Africa)
Marius van der Westhuizen (South Africa)
Television match official:
Marius Jonker (South Africa)

Notes:

- This is the first time since the first and second round of the 2014 Rugby Championship, that the starting XV for Australia has remained the same in consecutive weeks, a career first for Michael Cheika.

== Statistics ==
=== Points scorers ===
Pos	Name	Team	Pts
1	Bernard Foley	Australia	80
2	Beauden Barrett	New Zealand	70
3	Elton Jantjies	South Africa	68
4	Nicolás Sánchez	Argentina	46
5	Israel Folau	Australia	25
5	Rieko Ioane	New Zealand	25
7	Lima Sopoaga	New Zealand	21
8	Damian McKenzie	New Zealand	20
9	Emiliano Boffelli	Argentina	17
10	Kurtley Beale	Australia	15
10	Ryan Crotty	New Zealand	15
10	Will Genia	Australia	15
10	Siya Kolisi	South Africa	15
10	Marika Koroibete	Australia	15
10	Nehe Milner-Skudder	New Zealand	15

=== Try scorers ===
Pos	Name	Team	Tries
1	Israel Folau	Australia	5
1	Rieko Ioane	New Zealand	5
3	Damian McKenzie	New Zealand	4
4	Beauden Barrett	New Zealand	3
4	Kurtley Beale	Australia	3
4	Ryan Crotty	New Zealand	3
4	Will Genia	Australia	3
4	Siya Kolisi	South Africa	3
4	Marika Koroibete	Australia	3
4	Nehe Milner-Skudder	New Zealand	3

Current as of 30 September 2017.

== Squads ==
=== Summary ===
Nation	Match venues			Head coach	Captain
Nation	Name	City	Capacity	Head coach	Captain
Argentina	José Amalfitani Stadium	Buenos Aires	49,540	(Argentina) Daniel Hourcade	Agustín Creevy
Argentina	Estadio Malvinas Argentinas	Mendoza	40,268	(Argentina) Daniel Hourcade	Agustín Creevy
Argentina	Estadio Padre Ernesto Martearena	Salta	20,408	(Argentina) Daniel Hourcade	Agustín Creevy
Australia	Stadium Australia	Sydney	83,500	(Australia) Michael Cheika	Michael Hooper
Australia	Canberra Stadium	Canberra	25,011	(Australia) Michael Cheika	Michael Hooper
Australia	Perth Oval	Perth	20,500	(Australia) Michael Cheika	Michael Hooper
New Zealand	Forsyth Barr Stadium	Dunedin	30,748	(New Zealand) Steve Hansen	Kieran Read
New Zealand	North Harbour Stadium	Albany	25,000	(New Zealand) Steve Hansen	Kieran Read
New Zealand	Yarrow Stadium	New Plymouth	25,000	(New Zealand) Steve Hansen	Kieran Read
South Africa	Newlands Stadium	Cape Town	51,900	(South Africa) Allister Coetzee	Eben Etzebeth
South Africa	Nelson Mandela Bay Stadium	Port Elizabeth	48,000	(South Africa) Allister Coetzee	Eben Etzebeth
South Africa	Free State Stadium	Bloemfontein	46,000	(South Africa) Allister Coetzee	Eben Etzebeth

Note: Ages, caps and clubs/franchises are of 19 August 2017 – the starting date of the tournament

=== Argentina ===
On 20 July 2017, Argentina named a 33-man squad for the Championship.

^{1} On 22 August, Felipe Arregui was added to the squad as injury cover for Nahuel Tetaz Chaparro who was injured in the opening round of the Championship.

Player	Position	Date of birth (age)	Caps	Club/province
Agustín Creevy (c)	Hooker	15 March 1985 (aged 32)	62	(Argentina) Jaguares
Julián Montoya	Hooker	29 October 1993 (aged 23)	32	(Argentina) Jaguares
Felipe Arregui ^{1}	Prop	9 June 1994 (aged 23)	0	(Argentina) Jaguares
Santiago García Botta	Prop	19 June 1992 (aged 25)	15	(Argentina) Jaguares
Ramiro Herrera	Prop	14 February 1989 (aged 28)	34	(Argentina) Jaguares
Lucas Noguera Paz	Prop	5 October 1993 (aged 23)	34	(Argentina) Jaguares
Enrique Pieretto	Prop	15 December 1994 (aged 22)	16	(Argentina) Jaguares
Nahuel Tetaz Chaparro ^{1}	Prop	11 June 1989 (aged 28)	33	(Argentina) Jaguares
Matías Alemanno	Lock	5 December 1991 (aged 25)	34	(Argentina) Jaguares
Marcos Kremer	Lock	30 July 1997 (aged 20)	3	(Argentina) Jaguares
Tomás Lavanini	Lock	22 January 1993 (aged 24)	32	(Argentina) Jaguares
Guido Petti	Lock	17 November 1994 (aged 22)	27	(Argentina) Jaguares
Rodrigo Báez	Flanker	8 February 1989 (aged 28)	17	(Argentina) Jaguares
Juan Manuel Leguizamón	Flanker	6 June 1983 (aged 34)	77	(Argentina) Jaguares
Tomás Lezana	Flanker	16 February 1994 (aged 23)	13	(Argentina) Jaguares
Pablo Matera	Flanker	18 July 1993 (aged 24)	37	(Argentina) Jaguares
Javier Ortega Desio	Flanker	14 June 1990 (aged 27)	34	(Argentina) Jaguares
Benjamín Macome	Number 8	10 January 1986 (aged 31)	24	(Argentina) Jaguares
Leonardo Senatore	Number 8	13 May 1984 (aged 33)	46	(Argentina) Jaguares
Gonzalo Bertranou	Scrum-half	31 December 1993 (aged 23)	5	(Argentina) Jaguares
Tomás Cubelli	Scrum-half	12 June 1989 (aged 28)	58	(Australia) Brumbies
Martín Landajo	Scrum-half	14 June 1988 (aged 29)	69	(Argentina) Jaguares
Santiago González Iglesias	Fly-half	16 June 1988 (aged 29)	32	(Argentina) Jaguares
Nicolás Sánchez	Fly-half	26 October 1988 (aged 28)	53	(Argentina) Jaguares
Jerónimo de la Fuente	Centre	24 February 1991 (aged 26)	30	(Argentina) Jaguares
Bautista Ezcurra	Centre	21 April 1995 (aged 22)	0	(Argentina) Jaguares
Juan Martín Hernández	Centre	7 August 1982 (aged 35)	68	(Argentina) Jaguares
Matías Moroni	Centre	29 March 1991 (aged 26)	22	(Argentina) Jaguares
Matías Orlando	Centre	14 November 1991 (aged 25)	24	(Argentina) Jaguares
Emiliano Boffelli	Wing	16 January 1995 (aged 22)	2	(Argentina) Jaguares
Santiago Cordero	Wing	6 December 1993 (aged 23)	30	(Argentina) Jaguares
Manuel Montero	Wing	20 November 1991 (aged 25)	26	(Argentina) Jaguares
Ramiro Moyano	Fullback	28 May 1990 (aged 27)	15	(Argentina) Jaguares
Joaquín Tuculet	Fullback	8 August 1989 (aged 28)	43	(Argentina) Jaguares

=== Australia ===
On 19 July, Michael Cheika named a 38-man extended training squad ahead of the Championship. Brumbies players were left out of the initial squad with their involvement in the quarter-finals of the 2017 Super Rugby season.

On 26 July, Cheika added seven Brumbies players to the squad following their conclusion in the Super Rugby.

On 4 August, Cheika named Australia's final squad for the Championship, reducing the squad from 45 to 34. Jermaine Ainsley, Sam Carter, Pekahou Cowan, Sef Fa'agase, Richard Hardwick and Campbell Magnay missed out on the squad, while Karmichael Hunt, Tolu Latu, Eto Nabuli and Sefa Naivalu was omitted due to injury. Taniela Tupou still ineligible for international duty.

^{1} On 1 September, Tolu Latu was called up as cover for Stephen Moore, withdrew for personal reasons, ahead of the third-round game against South Africa.

^{2} On 7 September, Dane Haylett-Petty was ruled out for the rest of the Championship due to injury. He was later replaced by Tom Banks on the 10 September.

^{3} On 11 September, Lukhan Tui was added to the squad ahead of the fourth round, replacing Kane Douglas was dropped from the squad.

Player	Position	Date of birth (age)	Caps	Franchise/province
Tolu Latu ^{1}	Hooker	23 February 1993 (aged 24)	4	Waratahs / NSW Country Eagles
Stephen Moore ^{1}	Hooker	20 January 1983 (aged 34)	120	Queensland Reds / Queensland Country
Tatafu Polota-Nau	Hooker	26 July 1985 (aged 32)	71	Western Force / Perth Spirit
Jordan Uelese	Hooker	24 January 1997 (aged 20)	0	Melbourne Rebels / Melbourne Rising
Allan Alaalatoa	Prop	28 January 1994 (aged 23)	12	Brumbies / Canberra Vikings
Tetera Faulkner	Prop	26 July 1988 (aged 29)	2	Western Force / Perth Spirit
Sekope Kepu	Prop	5 February 1986 (aged 31)	80	Waratahs / Greater Sydney Rams
Tom Robertson	Prop	28 August 1994 (aged 22)	9	Waratahs / NSW Country Eagles
Scott Sio	Prop	16 October 1991 (aged 25)	32	Brumbies / Canberra Vikings
Rory Arnold	Lock	1 July 1990 (aged 27)	12	Brumbies / Canberra Vikings
Adam Coleman	Lock	7 October 1991 (aged 25)	12	Western Force / Perth Spirit
Kane Douglas ^{3}	Lock	1 June 1989 (aged 28)	31	Queensland Reds / Brisbane City
Izack Rodda	Lock	20 August 1996 (aged 20)	0	Queensland Reds / Queensland Country
Rob Simmons	Lock	19 April 1989 (aged 28)	71	Queensland Reds / Queensland Country
Lukhan Tui ^{3}	Lock	19 September 1996 (aged 20)	0	Queensland Reds / Brisbane City
Jack Dempsey	Flanker	12 April 1994 (aged 23)	1	Waratahs / Sydney Rays
Ned Hanigan	Flanker	11 April 1995 (aged 22)	3	Waratahs / NSW Country Eagles
Michael Hooper (c)	Flanker	29 October 1991 (aged 25)	68	Waratahs / Sydney Rays
Sean McMahon	Flanker	18 June 1994 (aged 23)	15	Melbourne Rebels / Melbourne Rising
Adam Korczyk	Number 8	14 February 1995 (aged 22)	0	Queensland Reds / Brisbane City
Lopeti Timani	Number 8	28 September 1990 (aged 26)	7	Melbourne Rebels / Melbourne Rising
Will Genia	Scrum-half	17 January 1988 (aged 29)	78	Melbourne Rebels
Nick Phipps	Scrum-half	9 January 1989 (aged 28)	52	Waratahs / Greater Sydney Rams
Joe Powell	Scrum-half	11 April 1994 (aged 23)	2	Brumbies / Canberra Vikings
Bernard Foley	Fly-half	8 September 1989 (aged 27)	45	Waratahs / NSW Country Eagles
Kurtley Beale	Centre	6 January 1989 (aged 28)	60	Waratahs / Greater Sydney Rams
Reece Hodge	Centre	26 August 1994 (aged 22)	13	Melbourne Rebels / Melbourne Rising
Samu Kerevi	Centre	27 September 1993 (aged 23)	8	Queensland Reds / Brisbane City
Tevita Kuridrani	Centre	31 March 1991 (aged 26)	47	Brumbies / Canberra Vikings
Bill Meakes	Centre	23 February 1991 (aged 26)	0	Western Force / Perth Spirit
Dane Haylett-Petty ^{2}	Wing	18 June 1989 (aged 28)	17	Western Force / Perth Spirit
Marika Koroibete	Wing	26 July 1992 (aged 25)	0	Melbourne Rebels / Melbourne Rising
Izaia Perese	Wing	17 May 1997 (aged 20)	0	Queensland Reds / Queensland Country
Curtis Rona	Wing	26 May 1992 (aged 25)	0	Western Force / Perth Spirit
Henry Speight	Wing	24 March 1988 (aged 29)	12	Brumbies / Canberra Vikings
Tom Banks ^{2}	Fullback	18 June 1994 (aged 23)	0	Brumbies / Canberra Vikings
Israel Folau	Fullback	3 April 1989 (aged 28)	55	Waratahs / Greater Sydney Rams

=== New Zealand ===
New Zealand's 34-man squad for the Championship. Damian McKenzie was named in the squad as a later replacement for Ben Smith who goes on a sabbatical following the opening two rounds.

^{1} On 10 August, Jordie Barrett withdrew from the squad due to injury and was replaced by David Havili.

^{2} On 13 August, Dane Coles was ruled out of the first round of the Rugby Championship and Ricky Riccitelli was called as cover.

^{3} On 20 August, Kane Hames, Akira Ioane and Atu Moli temporarily joined the squad ahead of the second round of the Championship.

^{4} On 24 August, Jeffery Toomaga-Allen was called up to the squad after Owen Franks was ruled out of the second-round game against Australia. Franks was later ruled out for the remainder of the Championship.

^{5} On 4 September, Blake Gibson was called up to the squad as injury cover for Sam Cane.

^{6} On 10 September, Joe Moody was ruled out for the remaining matches in the Championship and Kane Hames was recalled as his replacement.

^{7} On 18 September, Matt Todd and Patrick Tuipulotu were added to the squad for the final two rounds, away to Argentina and South Africa.

Player	Position	Date of birth (age)	Caps	Franchise/province
Dane Coles	Hooker	10 December 1986 (aged 30)	49	Hurricanes / Wellington
Nathan Harris	Hooker	8 March 1992 (aged 25)	8	Chiefs / Bay of Plenty
Ricky Riccitelli ^{2}	Hooker	3 February 1995 (aged 22)	0	Hurricanes / Taranaki
Codie Taylor	Hooker	31 March 1991 (aged 26)	19	Crusaders / Canterbury
Wyatt Crockett	Prop	24 January 1983 (aged 34)	62	Crusaders / Canterbury
Owen Franks ^{4}	Prop	23 December 1987 (aged 29)	94	Crusaders / Canterbury
Kane Hames ^{3, 6}	Prop	28 August 1988 (aged 28)	1	Chiefs / Tasman
Nepo Laulala	Prop	6 November 1991 (aged 25)	4	Chiefs / Counties Manukau
Atunaisa Moli ^{3}	Prop	12 June 1995 (aged 22)	0	Chiefs / Waikato
Joe Moody ^{6}	Prop	18 September 1988 (aged 28)	28	Crusaders / Canterbury
Jeffery Toomaga-Allen ^{4}	Prop	19 November 1990 (aged 26)	1	Hurricanes / Wellington
Ofa Tu'ungafasi	Prop	19 April 1992 (aged 25)	4	Blues / Auckland
Scott Barrett	Lock	20 November 1993 (aged 23)	8	Crusaders / Taranaki
Brodie Retallick	Lock	31 May 1991 (aged 26)	64	Chiefs / Hawke's Bay
Luke Romano	Lock	16 February 1986 (aged 31)	26	Crusaders / Canterbury
Patrick Tuipulotu ^{7}	Lock	23 January 1993 (aged 24)	12	Blues / Auckland
Sam Whitelock	Lock	12 October 1988 (aged 28)	88	Crusaders / Canterbury
Sam Cane ^{5}	Flanker	13 January 1992 (aged 25)	44	Chiefs / Bay of Plenty
Vaea Fifita	Flanker	17 June 1992 (aged 25)	1	Hurricanes / Wellington
Blake Gibson ^{5}	Flanker	19 April 1995 (aged 22)	0	Blues / Auckland
Jerome Kaino	Flanker	6 April 1983 (aged 34)	81	Blues / Auckland
Ardie Savea	Flanker	14 October 1993 (aged 23)	16	Hurricanes / Wellington
Liam Squire	Flanker	20 March 1991 (aged 26)	8	Highlanders / Tasman
Matt Todd ^{7}	Flanker	24 March 1988 (aged 29)	8	Crusaders / Canterbury
Akira Ioane ^{3}	Number 8	16 January 1995 (aged 22)	0	Blues / Auckland
Kieran Read (c)	Number 8	26 October 1985 (aged 31)	100	Crusaders / Counties Manukau
Tawera Kerr-Barlow	Half-back	15 August 1990 (aged 27)	25	Chiefs / Waikato
TJ Perenara	Half-back	23 January 1992 (aged 25)	33	Hurricanes / Wellington
Aaron Smith	Half-back	21 November 1988 (aged 28)	62	Highlanders / Manawatu
Beauden Barrett	First five-eighth	27 May 1991 (aged 26)	53	Hurricanes / Taranaki
Lima Sopoaga	First five-eighth	3 February 1991 (aged 26)	7	Highlanders / Southland
Ryan Crotty	Centre	23 September 1988 (aged 28)	27	Crusaders / Canterbury
David Havili ^{1}	Centre	23 December 1994 (aged 22)	0	Crusaders / Tasman
Ngani Laumape	Centre	22 April 1993 (aged 24)	2	Hurricanes / Manawatu
Anton Lienert-Brown	Centre	15 April 1995 (aged 22)	13	Chiefs / Waikato
Sonny Bill Williams	Centre	3 August 1985 (aged 32)	36	Blues / Waikato
Israel Dagg	Wing	6 June 1988 (aged 29)	65	Crusaders / Hawke's Bay
Rieko Ioane	Wing	18 March 1997 (aged 20)	4	Blues / Auckland
Nehe Milner-Skudder	Wing	15 December 1990 (aged 26)	8	Hurricanes / Manawatu
Waisake Naholo	Wing	8 May 1991 (aged 26)	13	Highlanders / Taranaki
Jordie Barrett ^{1}	Fullback	15 February 1997 (aged 20)	2	Hurricanes / Taranaki
Damian McKenzie	Fullback	25 April 1995 (aged 22)	2	Chiefs / Waikato
Ben Smith	Fullback	1 June 1986 (aged 31)	62	Highlanders / Otago

=== South Africa ===
On 5 August, coach Allister Coetzee named a 34-man squad for the Championship.

^{1} On 14 August, Ruan Dreyer was called up as injury cover for Frans Malherbe who could miss the whole Championship.

^{2} On 20 August, Jano Vermaak was called as injury cover for Ross Cronjé after Cronjé suffered an ankle injury in the opening round.

^{3} On 9 September, Coenie Oosthuizen was ruled our for the rest of the tournament after sustaining an injury in the third round. Wilco Louw was called up to replace him.

^{4} On 20 September, Francois Louw, S'busiso Nkosi and Louis Schreuder were added to the squad, with Louw and Schreuder replacing Jaco Kriel and Francois Hougaard in the squad.

Player	Position	Date of birth (age)	Caps	Club/province
Malcolm Marx	Hooker	13 July 1994 (aged 23)	5	(South Africa) Lions
Bongi Mbonambi	Hooker	7 January 1991 (aged 26)	8	(South Africa) Stormers
Chiliboy Ralepelle	Hooker	11 September 1986 (aged 30)	22	(South Africa) Sharks
Ruan Dreyer ^{1}	Prop	16 September 1990 (aged 26)	1	(South Africa) Lions
Lizo Gqoboka	Prop	24 March 1990 (aged 27)	0	(South Africa) Bulls
Steven Kitshoff	Prop	10 February 1992 (aged 25)	13	(South Africa) Stormers
Wilco Louw ^{3}	Prop	20 July 1994 (aged 23)	0	(South Africa) Stormers
Frans Malherbe ^{1}	Prop	14 March 1991 (aged 26)	17	(South Africa) Stormers
Tendai Mtawarira	Prop	1 August 1985 (aged 32)	90	(South Africa) Sharks
Trevor Nyakane	Prop	4 May 1989 (aged 28)	28	(South Africa) Bulls
Coenie Oosthuizen ^{3}	Prop	22 March 1989 (aged 28)	26	(South Africa) Sharks
Lood de Jager	Lock	17 December 1992 (aged 24)	29	(South Africa) Bulls
Pieter-Steph du Toit	Lock	20 August 1992 (aged 24)	23	(South Africa) Stormers
Eben Etzebeth (c)	Lock	29 October 1991 (aged 25)	57	(South Africa) Stormers
Franco Mostert	Lock	27 November 1990 (aged 26)	10	(South Africa) Lions / (Japan) Ricoh Black Rams
Uzair Cassiem	Flanker	17 March 1990 (aged 27)	1	(South Africa) Cheetahs
Jean-Luc du Preez	Flanker	5 August 1995 (aged 22)	4	(South Africa) Sharks
Siya Kolisi	Flanker	16 June 1991 (aged 26)	19	(South Africa) Stormers
Jaco Kriel ^{4}	Flanker	21 August 1989 (aged 27)	8	(South Africa) Lions / (Japan) Kubota Spears
Francois Louw ^{4}	Flanker	15 June 1985 (aged 32)	52	(England) Bath
Oupa Mohojé	Flanker	3 August 1990 (aged 27)	17	(South Africa) Cheetahs
Dan du Preez	Number 8	5 August 1995 (aged 22)	0	(South Africa) Sharks
Ross Cronjé ^{2}	Scrum-half	26 July 1989 (aged 28)	2	(South Africa) Lions
Francois Hougaard ^{4}	Scrum-half	6 April 1988 (aged 29)	42	(England) Worcester Warriors
Rudy Paige	Scrum-half	2 August 1989 (aged 28)	8	(South Africa) Bulls
Louis Schreuder ^{4}	Scrum-half	25 April 1990 (aged 27)	0	(South Africa) Sharks
Jano Vermaak ^{2}	Scrum-half	1 January 1985 (aged 32)	3	(South Africa) Stormers
Curwin Bosch	Fly-half	25 June 1997 (aged 20)	0	(South Africa) Sharks
Elton Jantjies	Fly-half	1 August 1990 (aged 27)	14	(South Africa) Lions / (Japan) NTT Communications Shining Arcs
Handré Pollard	Fly-half	11 March 1994 (aged 23)	20	(South Africa) Bulls
Damian de Allende	Centre	25 November 1991 (aged 25)	22	(South Africa) Stormers
Jesse Kriel	Centre	15 February 1994 (aged 23)	19	(South Africa) Bulls
Jan Serfontein	Centre	15 April 1993 (aged 24)	29	(South Africa) Bulls
Francois Venter	Centre	19 April 1991 (aged 26)	3	(South Africa) Cheetahs
Dillyn Leyds	Wing	12 September 1992 (aged 24)	3	(South Africa) Stormers
S'busiso Nkosi ^{4}	Wing	21 January 1996 (aged 21)	0	(South Africa) Sharks
Raymond Rhule	Wing	6 November 1992 (aged 24)	3	(South Africa) Cheetahs
Courtnall Skosan	Wing	24 July 1991 (aged 26)	3	(South Africa) Lions
Andries Coetzee	Fullback	1 March 1990 (aged 27)	3	(South Africa) Lions
Warrick Gelant	Fullback	20 May 1995 (aged 22)	0	(South Africa) Bulls

== See also ==
- History of rugby union matches between Argentina and Australia
- History of rugby union matches between Argentina and New Zealand
- History of rugby union matches between Argentina and South Africa
- History of rugby union matches between Australia and South Africa
- History of rugby union matches between Australia and New Zealand
- History of rugby union matches between New Zealand and South Africa
