= Leka Tuʻungafasi =

Tongan rugby union player

- Born: Tonga
- Notable relative(s): Isi Tuʻungafasi (brother); Ofa Tuʻungafasi (brother); Mofuike Tuʻungafasi (father)

Rugby union career
- Position: Prop
Senior career
Years	Team	Apps	(Points)
2021	Northland	6	(5)
2025–	North Harbour	8	(0)
- Correct as of 12 August 2023

Leka Tuʻungafasi is a Tongan rugby union player. His position is prop. He is the brother of Ofa Tuʻungafasi.

In June 2021 he signed for Northland.

After a four-year absence from professional rugby following neck surgery, Tu'ungafasi signed with North Harbour in 2025.
