= Jerome Kaino =

New Zealand rugby union player

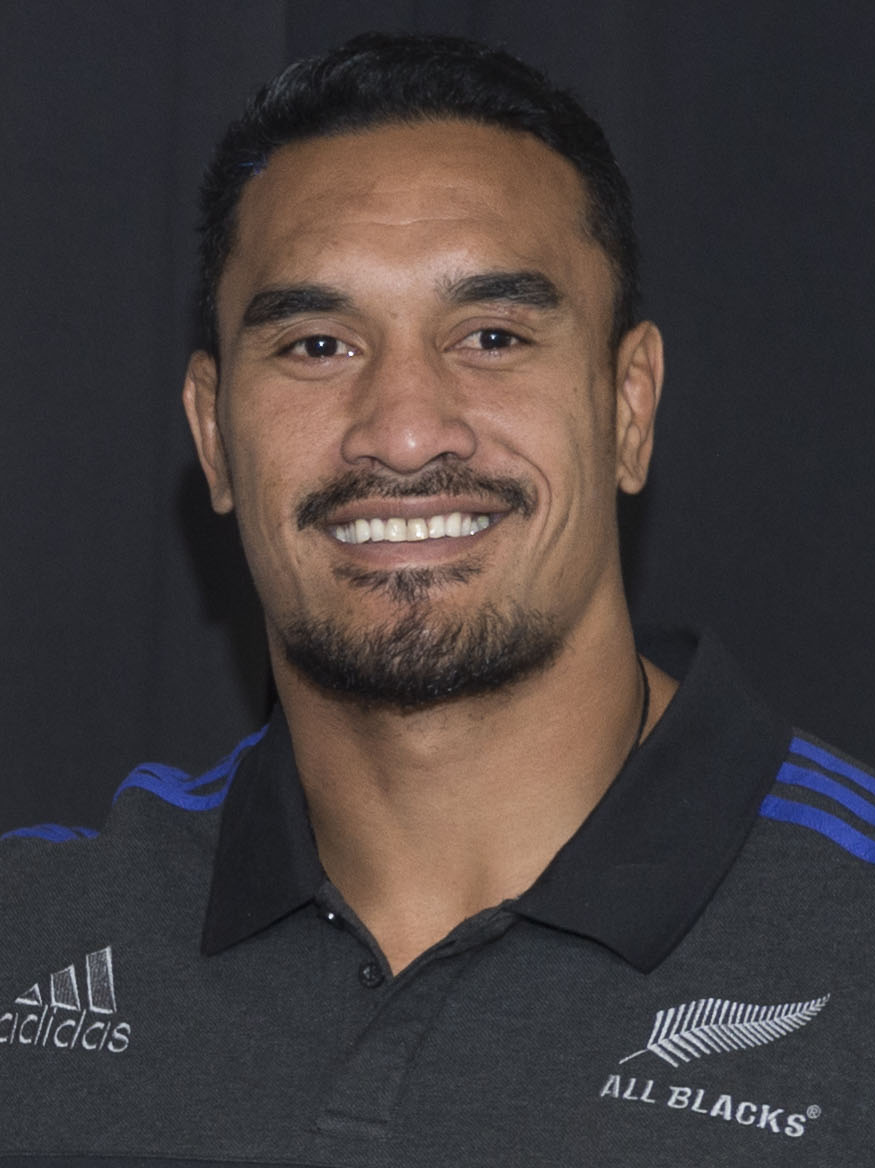
- Born: Jerome Kaino; 6 April 1983 (age 43) Faga'alu, American Samoa
- Height: 1.96 m (6 ft 5 in)
- Weight: 110 kg (240 lb; 17 st 5 lb)
- School: Papakura High School; St Kentigern College

Rugby union career
- Position(s): Flanker, Number 8, Lock
Amateur team(s)
| Years | Team | Apps | (Points) |
- Auckland University
- Correct as of 13 August 2021
Senior career
| Years | Team | Apps | (Points) |
| 2004–2018 | Blues | 137 | (70) |
| 2004–2017 | Auckland | 48 | (50) |
| 2012–2014 | Toyota Verblitz | 18 | (10) |
| 2018–2021 | Toulouse | 62 | (10) |
- Correct as of 13 August 2021
International career
| Years | Team | Apps | (Points) |
| 2003–2004 | New Zealand Colts | 9 | (25) |
| 2004–2017 | New Zealand | 83 | (65) |
| 2005–2007 | Junior All Blacks | 7 | (0) |
| 2011 | Barbarian F.C. | 1 | (0) |
- Correct as of 13 August 2021
Coaching career
- Years: Team
- 2021–: Toulouse (skills and U21)
- 2026–: Georgia (Assistant Coach)
- Correct as of 7 June 2021

Jerome Kaino (born 6 April 1983) is a former New Zealand rugby union player.

In 2004, he was named IRB International Under-21 player of the year. In 2011, he was named the New Zealand Rugby player of the year, finishing ahead of Richie McCaw and Ma'a Nonu in the voting. He is a key member of 2011 and 2015 Rugby World Cup winning teams, becoming one of only 20 players to have won multiple Rugby World Cups.

Having played 137 games with the Blues, he is a Super Rugby centurion. Kaino is considered by many to be one of the game's greats.

He is the second U.S. national of Samoan descent to play for the All Blacks. The first was Frank Solomon in 1931.

== Early life ==
Kaino was born on 6 April 1983 at Lyndon B. Johnson Medical Center in Faga'alu, located in the U.S. territory of American Samoa as the third of six children. In 1987 at the age of 4, he and his family relocated from their home village of Leone, Tutuila, to Papakura, Auckland. After settling in Papakura, he played junior rugby league for the Papakura Sea Eagles before switching to rugby union in secondary school at Papakura High School and Saint Kentigern College where he was offered a rugby scholarship. He attended both schools with former All Black John Afoa.

If Kaino had not come to New Zealand following the lead of his uncle, his relatives assumed that he would have enlisted in the United States Army.

== Club career ==
=== Auckland and Blues ===
Kaino made his Auckland debut in 2004 and his Blues debut in 2006. Prior to being signed for the Blues, Kaino came off the bench in Auckland's 13-17 loss to the British & Irish Lions on 5 July 2005.

In 2012 it was announced that Kaino would be leaving the Blues for Japanese club Toyota Verblitz on a two-year deal, following the conclusion of the 2011 Rugby World Cup.

On 4 October 2013, Kaino announced he had re-signed with New Zealand Rugby Union, North Harbour and Auckland Blues on a two-year contract. He was expected to return to New Zealand in February in time for the beginning of the 2014 Super Rugby season.

Kaino made successful return to the Blues in the 2014 season, being named as the team's captain for the 2015 Super Rugby season, taking over from fellow back-rower Luke Braid. Kaino played his 100th match for the Blues on 28 February 2015, but the Blues unfortunately lost 24-25 to the Cheetahs that day. Kaino's captaincy at the Blues did not last long, with hooker James Parsons taking over during the 2016 Super Rugby season.

On 8 September 2017, Kaino played for Auckland for the first time since 2010. Kaino started at number 8 as Auckland lost 38-49 to Taranaki.

=== Toulouse ===
On 17 February 2018, rumours were released that Kaino would potentially move to France at the conclusion of the 2018 Super Rugby season. A week later, Kaino confirmed he would leave New Zealand. Stade Toulousain, based in Toulouse, France subsequently announced that Kaino would join their team, containing Kaino's former All Blacks and Blues teammate Charlie Faumuina.

He won Top 14 in 2019 and 2021, as European Rugby Champions Cup in 2021 being one of the cornerstones of the French team.

In June 2021, Kaino retired and stayed in France, becoming Toulouse skills coach and academy assistant coach.

== International career ==
=== Early career ===
Despite being without a Super Rugby contract for the 2005 Super 12 season, Kaino was called into the All Blacks on 2004's end-of-season tour. Kaino made his All Blacks debut on 4 December 2004 when he started at blindside flanker against the Barbarians in an uncapped fixture at Twickenham Stadium in London. Kaino played the full 80 minutes and scored a try on debut, with the All Blacks winning 47-19.

Kaino played his first two tests against Ireland in 2006. He did not play for New Zealand again until 2008, missing the 2007 Rugby World Cup due to injury.

In 2008, Kaino, who earned many comparisons with Jerry Collins for his uncompromising physical style, would become a key member of the All Blacks setup. Kaino's return from injury saw him become the national side's first-choice blindside flanker.

In 2011, Kaino played an important role in the All Blacks winning the Rugby World Cup. He was named in the starting XV for every game. He played every minute of every game except for the final few seconds in the semi-final against Australia. He scored four tries in the World Cup.

=== 2014-2015 ===
Kaino returned to the All Blacks from his stint in Japan and during the 2014 three-test series against England, temporarily replaced incumbent number eight Kieran Read, who was being forced to sit out after suffering a relapse of concussion symptoms. Kaino started at number 8 for the first two tests of the series, the second of which on 14 July 2014, was his 50th test for the All Blacks. Kaino celebrated his milestone with a narrow 28-27 victory for the All Blacks. Kaino returned to blindside flanker in the third test if the series following Read's recovery, pushing Liam Messam out of his starting place. Kaino finished off his 2014 season in which he made eight appearances for the All Blacks by scoring his only try of the year, allowing the All Blacks to comfortably beat Wales 34-16 on 22 November 2014.

Kaino was selected for the 2015 Rugby World Cup as part of New Zealand's 31-man All Blacks squad. Kaino achieved many career milestones in the competition, playing in all seven All Black tests in the competition. His most notable performances in the competition were in the quarter-final on 17 October 2015 where the All Blacks beat France 62-13 and in the semi-final's 20-18 win against South Africa on 24 October 2015. He scored tries in both of those knockout rounds, but was also yellow-carded for being offside against South Africa in the 39th minute of the semi-final. Kaino, alongside teammates Sam Whitelock and Sonny Bill Williams played in their record 14th consecutive World Cup wins when New Zealand beat Australia 34-17 on 31 October 2015, to win their third Rugby World Cup. Kaino was replaced by Hurricanes forward Victor Vito with nine minutes left of the World Cup final.

=== 2016-2018 ===
Kaino struggled with injury throughout 2016, but still managed to play for New Zealand in 12 All Blacks tests. Kaino scored his final international try for New Zealand on 20 August 2016 as the All Blacks beat the Wallabies by 42-8. This season most notably included the 40-29 defeat to Ireland in Chicago where Kaino was featured out of position as lock, due to injury previously received by Brodie Retallick and Sam Whitelock against Australia. Kaino struggled to perform well in the unfamiliar role against Ireland and was replaced by test debutant Scott Barrett in the 45th minute.

Kaino recovered from a knee injury to be selected as a member of the All Blacks' 33-man squad for the 2017 Pasifika Challenge and three-test series against the touring British & Irish Lions team. Becoming one of few players to play against the Lions in multiple tours, Kaino took part in the first test of the 2017 series on 24 June 2017 by starting at blindside flanker for his home crowd at Eden Park. Kaino was subbed off in the 45th minute, being replaced by Ardie Savea as the All Blacks went on to win 30-15. Kaino was unfortunately subbed off less than 30 minutes into the second test of the Lions series due to the red-carding of Blues teammate Sonny Bill Williams. Kaino was replaced by debutant Ngani Laumape so that the All Blacks were not a back short at set-piece. Kaino was also yellow-carded in the third test's 49th minute for a swinging forearm on Lions lock Alun Wyn Jones, who had to be replaced by Courtney Lawes as he copped a blow from Kaino's arm. The series was disappointing for Kaino and for the All Blacks who allowed the Lions to break multiple records as the series was drawn 1-1.

Following the drawn Lions series, Kaino was selected for the 2017 Rugby Championship but did not play in the competition for personal reasons, making his first ITM Cup appearance for Auckland in 7 years. Kaino's absence from the Rugby Championship saw him lose his starting spot to Liam Squire and Vaea Fifita who spent the 2017 putting forward cases to make the number 6 jersey theirs. Kaino started at number 8 in the All Blacks' 31-22 win over the Barbarians on the end-of-year tour but was subbed off with a posterior cruciate ligament injury in the 45th minute and replaced by Sam Cane.

Kaino announced his signing to Toulouse in 2018, effectively retiring from international rugby.

== Honours ==
=== Auckland ===
- NPC/Air New Zealand Cup: 2005, 2007
- Ranfurly Shield: 2007-08 (5)

=== Stade Toulousain ===
- Top 14: 2019, 2021
- European Rugby Champions Cup: 2021

=== New Zealand ===
- Rugby World Cup: 2011, 2015
- Tri Nations/The Rugby Championship: 2008, 2010, 2014, 2016, 2017

== Career notes ==
- Started the first two matches of the Junior All Blacks tour to Australia in 2005 before returning to play for Auckland against the British & Irish Lions.
- Scored a try in his All Blacks debut against the Barbarians at Twickenham in December 2004.
- Voted IRB International U21 Player of the Year in 2004 and was Player of the Tournament at the 2004 IRB Under 21 World Championship.
- NZRU Age Grade Player of the Year 2004.
- Scored his first world cup try at the 2011 Rugby World Cup in the opening match against Tonga. He then went on to score three more tries bringing his tally to four. Currently he has scored the most tries of any forward.
- Nominee for IRB International Player of the Year 2011. Won by Thierry Dusautoir.

Awards
| Preceded by (New Zealand) Ben Atiga | IRB International U21 Player of the Year; 2004 | Succeeded by (Australia) Tatafu Polota-Nau |
