= Ofa Tuʻungafasi =

NZ international rugby union player

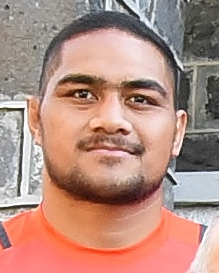
- Tuʻungafasi at the Government House in Auckland, September 2017
- Full name: Aniseto Ofa He Moori Tuʻungafasi
- Born: 19 April 1992 (age 34) Nukuʻalofa, Tonga
- Height: 193 cm (6 ft 4 in)
- Weight: 132 kg (291 lb; 20 st 11 lb)
- School: Māngere College
- Notable relative(s): Isileli Tuʻungafasi (brother); Leka Tuʻungafasi (brother); Mofuike Tuʻungafasi (father)

Rugby union career
- Position: Prop
- Current team: Blues, Auckland
Senior career
Years	Team	Apps	(Points)
2012–2021, 2026–	Auckland	50	(10)
2013–	Blues	166	(70)
2022–2025	Northland	4	(0)
- Correct as of 1 October 2026
International career
Years	Team	Apps	(Points)
2012	New Zealand U20	5	(5)
2016–2024	New Zealand	68	(5)
2020	North Island	1	(0)
- Correct as of 1 October 2026

Aniseto Ofa He Moori Tuʻungafasi (born 19 April 1992) is a New Zealand rugby union player who plays as a prop for the All Blacks, the Blues in Super Rugby and Auckland in the Bunnings NPC.

== Career ==
=== Early career ===
Tuʻungafasi made his provincial debut in 2012 in a match against Hawke's Bay and his strong performances during the season saw him named in the Blues squad for the 2013 Super Rugby season.

Tuʻungafasi represented New Zealand Under 20 in the 2012 IRB Junior World Championship in South Africa making 5 appearances and scoring 1 try.

On 29 May 2016 he was selected in the All Blacks squad for a three test series against Wales. Tuʻungafasi made his debut for New Zealand in the third test of the series, which was a 46-6 thrashing of Wales where Tuʻungafasi replaced Blues teammate Charlie Faumuina off the bench after 53 minutes. Tuʻungafasi was one of three forwards to debut against Wales that day, doing so alongside Elliot Dixon and Liam Squire. Tuʻungafasi made four more appearances for the All Blacks off the bench that year.

=== 2017 ===
Tuʻungafasi started for the Blues in a historic 22–16 win over the touring British & Irish Lions in 2017, becoming a regular player for the All Blacks off the bench after Faumuina's departure at the end of the Lions series. This saw Tuʻungafasi score his first try for the All Blacks in the record 57–0 win over South Africa in the 2017 Rugby Championship and make headlines for bone crushing tackles on Wallabies first five Bernard Foley and replacement lock Lukhan Tui in the third Bledisloe Cup test of 2017, but it was lost 23-18 after Tuʻungafasi conceded a penalty for illegally taking out a Wallaby with three minutes left.

Tuʻungafasi made his first start for the All Blacks in the 31–22 win against the Barbarians on the 2017 end of year tour and was one of only two players to make an appearance for the All Blacks on every match of the end of year tour, alongside Lima Sopoaga.

=== 2018 ===
Tuʻungafasi became a regular starter for the Blues in the 2018 Super Rugby season, replacing the departed Charlie Faumuina as the first choice tighthead prop. During Super Rugby, Tuʻungafasi re signed to the New Zealand Rugby Union, with a deal lasting until 2021.

After the Blues had a disappointing Super Rugby season, Tuʻungafasi was retained by the All Blacks for the three test series against France in 2018. Tuʻungafasi was one of only three Blues players selected, alongside backs Rieko Ioane and Sonny Bill Williams. Tuʻungafasi replaced Owen Franks off the bench in all three tests against France, with his most notable involvement in the series being the second test, a 26–13 win over France on 16 June 2018. Tuʻungafasi replaced Franks in only the 34th minute, with Franks failing to scrummage to the referee's standards. Tuʻungafasi's shifts off the bench provided support to let the All Blacks win the series 3–0. He did also, however, cause controversy in the media for a head high tackle in the first test, with media deeming Tuʻungafasi and Sam Cane's combined tackle on French winger, Rémy Grosso, worthy of a red card, following a fracture to Grosso's face.

Tuʻungafasi earned a start at tighthead prop against Argentina, at Buenos Aires, during the 2018 Rugby Championship. The test, which took place on 29 September, was the first test start of Tuʻungafasi's international career. Tuʻungafasi was replaced by debutant, Angus Ta'avao, in the 51st minute, with the test ending in a 35–17 win, as well as New Zealand's third consecutive win of the competition.

On the 2018 end of season tour, Tuʻungafasi earned a start against Japan, being preferred over Tim Perry as the starting loosehead prop for the test. Tuʻungafasi was replaced by Perry after 54 minutes during the 69–31 victory and the following week, replaced Karl Tu'inukuafe, in New Zealand's narrow 16–15 win over England at Twickenham Stadium.

Having proved his ability to cover both loosehead and tighthead Prop, Tuʻungafasi was once again named by Steve Hansen, as the All Blacks' reserve loosehead Prop for their upcoming 17 November test, against World Rugby's number 2 ranked side, Ireland. Nepo Laulala was chosen as the reserve tighthead prop. The All Blacks went on to lose the test to Ireland, 9–16, with the whole front row being replaced in the 48th minute. After an average performance against Ireland, Tuʻungafasi finished the year off with a start against Italy, during a 66–3 win.

=== 2019 ===
Well established in the Blues, as well as the All Blacks setups, Tuʻungafasi played in four of New Zealand's five warm up tests prior to the World Cup, missing a record 26–47 defeat to Australia during the 2019 Rugby Championship, with rookie, Atu Moli, having earned a recall. Tuʻungafasi went on to replace Joe Moody off the bench in both the Bledisloe Cup winning 36–0 victory over Australia, as well as a 92–7 win over his native Tonga.

On 28 August, All Blacks Head Coach, Steve Hansen, named Tuʻungafasi as one of 31 players in New Zealand's squad for the 2019 Rugby World Cup. Tuʻungafasi and his father, Mofuike, joined the group of fathers and sons to play at a Rugby World Cup, including the likes of Wales' Ross Moriarty and France's Romain Ntamack, whose fathers had also previously appeared at World Cups.

Tuʻungafasi made five test appearances at the World Cup, including the 7–19 defeat to England during the semifinal.

=== 2020 ===
Tuʻungafasi had a stellar season with the Blues in Super Rugby Aotearoa, earning him a starting place in all four Bledisloe Cup tests against the Wallabies at the end of the year. However, he was red carded in the fourth game for a high tackle on Wallabies debutant Tom Wright. Tuʻungafasi's shoulder came into contact with Wright's chin. Tuʻungafasi was banned for three weeks by SAANZAR, which meant that he could not feature for the rest of the international season. This incident, along with the red card to Wallabies debutant Lachlan Swinton, prompted much public debate over the red card rule and high tackle framework.

== Personal life ==
Tuʻungafasi moved to New Zealand in 2006. He has ten brothers and two younger sisters. His father Mofuike, played as a lock and represented Tonga at the 1987 Rugby World Cup. One of his brothers, Isileli is also a professional rugby player. Tuʻungafasi is married and is a father of three daughters. Tuʻungafasi converted to Islam in March 2019.

In 2025, he played a minor role in the Apple TV+-produced Hawaiian period drama Chief of War appearing in the first episode as Kahekili's chosen warrior to fight Kaʻiana.

== Honours ==
New Zealand

- Rugby World Cup / Webb Ellis Cup
  - Third place: 2019
  - Second place: 2023

Blues

- Super Rugby
  - Champions: 2024
