= Vaea Fifita =

NZ & Tonga international rugby union player (born 1992)

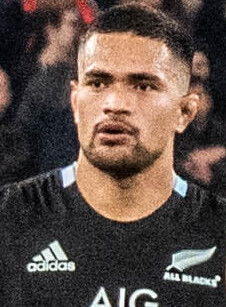
- Full name: Vaea Tangitau Lapota Fifita
- Born: 17 June 1992 (age 34) Vavaʻu, Tonga
- Height: 1.97 m (6 ft 6 in)
- Weight: 111 kg (245 lb; 17 st 7 lb)
- School: Tamaki College
- Notable relative: Leva Fifita (brother)

Rugby union career
- Position(s): Flanker, Lock
- Current team: Scarlets
Senior career
Years	Team	Apps	(Points)
2013–2020	Wellington	52	(80)
2015–2021	Hurricanes	69	(42)
2021–2022	Wasps	18	(10)
2022–	Scarlets	35	(35)
- Correct as of 28 August 2023
International career
Years	Team	Apps	(Points)
2017–2019	New Zealand	11	(10)
2022–	Tonga	9	(10)
- Correct as of 28 August 2023

Vaea Tangitau Lapota Fifita (born 17 June 1992) is a Tongan professional rugby union player who plays as a flanker for United Rugby Championship club Scarlets and the Tonga national team.

== Early life ==
Born and raised on the Tongan island of Vava'u, Fifita attended Tonga College on the larger island of Tongatapu and while there earned selection for the Tonga Schools side ahead of their tour to New Zealand. Impressive displays against New Zealand and Australia Secondary Schools Teams brought him to the attention of Tamaki College who offered him a rugby scholarship.

After graduating high school, Fifita spent time with former All Black number eight Murray Mexted at his international rugby academy in Palmerston North. This opened the way for him to make his way further south to play club rugby for the Wellington Axemen, whom he joined in 2012. He scored an incredible 26 tries in debut season of Wellington club rugby and then in 2013 he helped the Wellington sevens side lift the national title for the first time since 2002.

== Club career ==
Fifita first played provincial rugby with Wellington during the 2013 ITM Cup, making a sole appearance in a 35–27 win over North Harbour. The Lions were in fine form in 2013, finishing top of the log and reaching the Premiership final before going down 29–13 to Canterbury, however 2014 would be a different story as they finished 7th and last in the Premiership table which saw them relegated down to the Championship for 2015. Fifita saw plenty of game time in a constantly changing Wellington side, scoring 2 tries in 9 games and then going on to score an impressive 6 tries in 10 games as the Lions failed to win promotion back to the Premiership at the first time of asking, finishing 2nd on the log behind Hawke's Bay before being defeated 26–25 by the same opposition in the playoff final.

Although Fifita was not initially named in the Hurricanes squad ahead of the 2015 Super Rugby season, Fifita was called up to provide injury cover midway through the campaign and debuted in a 29–5 victory over the Blues in Auckland. In total he played twice during 2015 and that in addition to his good form for his provincial side, Wellington, saw him sign a three-year deal with the Hurricanes prior to the 2016 season.

Fifita's first full season of Super Rugby would prove to be one to remember as he played a part in all 18 games and forged a strong second-row partnership with Michael Fatialofa that helped the Hurricanes lift the Super Rugby title after a 20–3 win over South African side, the Lions in the final. Fifita scored 3 tries during the year including one in the 41–0 thrashing of the Sharks in the quarter-finals.

Despite an outstanding Super Rugby campaign, 2016 also proved to be a year of frustration for the men from New Zealand's capital as they once again finished 2nd in the Championship table, this time behind Otago before suffering a surprise 40–37 defeat at home to North Harbour in the playoff semi-finals. Playing largely as a loose forward, Fifita featured in 8 of Wellington's 11 matches during the year and contributed 2 tries.

Fifita competed at the 2017 Brisbane Global Tens with the Hurricanes but was injured during the competition and missed the first half of the season as a result. On 27 June 2017, Fifita started at blindside flanker for the Hurricanes against the touring British and Irish Lions side. Despite being behind 7–23 at half time, the Hurricanes managed to make a comeback. Fifita scored a try for the Hurricanes with ten minutes left as part of this comeback, pushing past Lions forwards George Kruis and CJ Stander to score. Fifita's try allowed the Hurricanes to draw 31–31 against the Lions.

Fifita returned from concussion, after the French test series, but had a string of poor performances that saw him benched for the Super Rugby playoffs, with Tongan-born Sam Lousi and the outgoing Michael Fatialofa, preferred as the starting locking combination, while Hurricanes Captain and England international, Brad Shields, was kept in his usual position at flanker. Fifita was yellow-carded for a fight in the last minute of the quarter-final, against the Chiefs, which the Hurricanes narrowly won, 32–31, thanks to a Man-of-the-Match performance by Vice-Captain, TJ Perenara. The Hurricanes were knocked out of the competition on 28 July 2018, with the Crusaders punishing the Hurricanes, who lost by 12–30.

Fifita put in many good performances during the 2019 Super Rugby season, playing his 50th game for the Hurricanes, alongside hooker Ricky Riccitelli, in the seventh round of the season, although it ended in an 8–32 loss to the Crusaders. Fifita's low point of the season was round 16, when he was red-carded for a shoulder charge to the chin of Sharks loose forward, Dan du Preez, although the Hurricanes still won 30–17. In early 2022, United Rugby Championship team Scarlets, announced the services of Fifita for the following season.

== International career ==
After a good season in 2016, Fifita was called up to the All Blacks end-of-year tour in 2016 as a replacement for the injured Sam Whitelock, and Luke Romano, after Romano left the tour due to a bereavement. He was not capped on the tour however, with fellow newcomer, Scott Barrett, preferred over Fifita.

Fifita was named in the All Blacks team in 2017 for the British and Irish Lions series and test against Samoa in Auckland, being called up as injury cover for All Black captain Kieran Read. Fifita quickly became a regular starter for New Zealand and made six appearances for the All Blacks in 2017. Fifita and his Hurricanes team-mate Jordie Barrett both earned their first cap for New Zealand in the 78–0 win against Samoa on 16 June 2017, one day prior to Fifita's 25th birthday, where Fifita replaced veteran Jerome Kaino off the bench 57 minutes into the test. Fifita performed well and scored a try on debut, following an offload from winger Israel Dagg.

Although Fifita did not play in the first two rounds of the competition, Fifita was given his first test start on 9 September 2017, against Argentina at Taranaki in the 2017 Rugby Championship. Fifita showcased the best performance of his career, scoring his second test try and getting fans, players, and the media raving about his performance. His try sparked a comeback for the All Blacks and was a 40m solo try where he out-ran winger, Santiago Cordero and fullback Joaquín Tuculet. Fifita was awarded Man of the Match for his 80-minute performance, which heavily contributed to the All Blacks' 39–22 win. With Head Coach Steve Hansen wanting to rest the incoming regular starter at blindside flanker, Liam Squire, Fifita started again against Argentina in Buenos Aires on 30 September, but failed to make the same impact as the previous match.

Fifita started against the Barbarians in a 31–22 win, and with injury to Jerome Kaino and illness to Liam Squire, Fifita made a start against France in the 38–18 win on the end-of-year tour's first test. Fifita started once more on the tour, against Scotland in a 22–17 win. Fifita's efforts on the end of year tour produced a try against the Barbarians, but a mixed performance against Scotland.

Finishing the 2017 season as a regular starter for his adopted country, Fifita unfortunately failed to keep consistent form, during the 2018 Super Rugby season, struggling with injuries during the season. Debate on Fifita's true starting position also factored into his drop in form, with then-Hurricanes Head Coach, Chris Boyd, wanting to play Fifita as a lock, while All Blacks Head Coach, Steve Hansen, insisted that Fifita was a specialist flanker. Fifita replaced Luke Whitelock and the injured Liam Squire off the bench, respectively, in the first two tests of the 2018 season, which were in the 2018 Steinlager series, against France. Fifita was unfortunately concussed in the second test however, ruling him out of the third test against France. Jackson Hemopo was called in as injury cover for Fifita and Squire, while Shannon Frizell also made his international debut, in the absence of Fifita.

When the All Blacks squad for the 2018 Rugby Championship was named, Fifita was left out of the squad, having been controversially dropped. Fifita was dropped due to the Hurricanes' persistency with using him as a lock, although Jackson Hemopo, normally a lock for the Highlanders, was re-selected for the All Blacks as a flanker.

After a solid campaign in the Mitre 10 Cup, with Wellington, Fifita earned a re-call for New Zealand towards the dying stages of the Rugby Championship. Fifita's form earned him two starts on the end of year tour, one in the 69–31 win over Japan, and the other in the 66–3 win over Italy. Fifita was one of the best-performing forwards on the field against Italy, having upped his workrate since recovery from injury.

After the Super Rugby playoffs, Fifita was retained in New Zealand's 39-man squad for the Rugby Championship, at the expense of Liam Squire. However, Fifita failed to perform to his best during the Championship, with Hurricanes team-mate, Ardie Savea, taking Fifita's starting spot. Following the Bledisloe Cup tests against Australia, Fifita was one of many All Blacks released to play for their provinces at the Mitre 10 Cup. However, Fifita failed to make the field for Wellington, withdrawing from a match with a knee injury.

On 28 August 2019, Fifita was omitted by All Blacks Head Coach, Steve Hansen, from New Zealand's 31-man squad to travel to the 2019 Rugby World Cup, with Luke Jacobson picked over Fifita, who was not considered for selection due to injury.

Fifita was not picked for New Zealand in 2020.

== Personal life ==
Fifita married his long-time partner, Hangale Havea, in 2018. Fifita is father to their two sons, Jason and Paula. His elder brother Leva Fifita is also a professional rugby union player who also plays international rugby for Tonga.

== Career statistics ==
=== Club summary ===
Year	Team	Played	Start	Sub	Tries	Cons	Pens	Drop	Points	Yel	Red
2015	Hurricanes	2	0	2	0	0	0	0	0	0	0
2016	Hurricanes	18	12	6	3	0	0	0	15	0	0
Career		20	12	8	3	0	0	0	15	0	0

as of 24 January 2017

== Honours ==
Hurricanes

- 1× Super Rugby: 2016
