= Mofuike Tuʻungafasi =

Tongan rugby union player

- Born: Mofuike Tuʻungafasi circa 1963

Rugby union career
- Position: Lock
Senior career
Years	Team	Apps	(Points)
- Tonga Defence Service
International career
Years	Team	Apps	(Points)
1986-1987	Tonga	5	(0)

Mofuike Tuʻungafasi (born circa 1963) is a former Tongan rugby union player. He played as a lock.

== Career ==
Tuʻungafasi had his first cap for Tonga during the match against Wales, in Nuku'alofa, on 12 June 1986. He also played in the 1987 Rugby World Cup, playing two matches, being the match against Ireland, in Brisbane his last international cap.

== Personal life ==
Mofuike is the father of four sons who play rugby union for Auckland in the Mitre 10 Cup: Ofa Tuʻungafasi, Victor Tuʻungafasi, Isi Tuʻungafasi and Seleti Tuʻungafasi, with Ofa being also a New Zealand international for the All Blacks.
