= Isi Tuʻungafasi =

New Zealand rugby union player

Isileli Tuʻungafasi
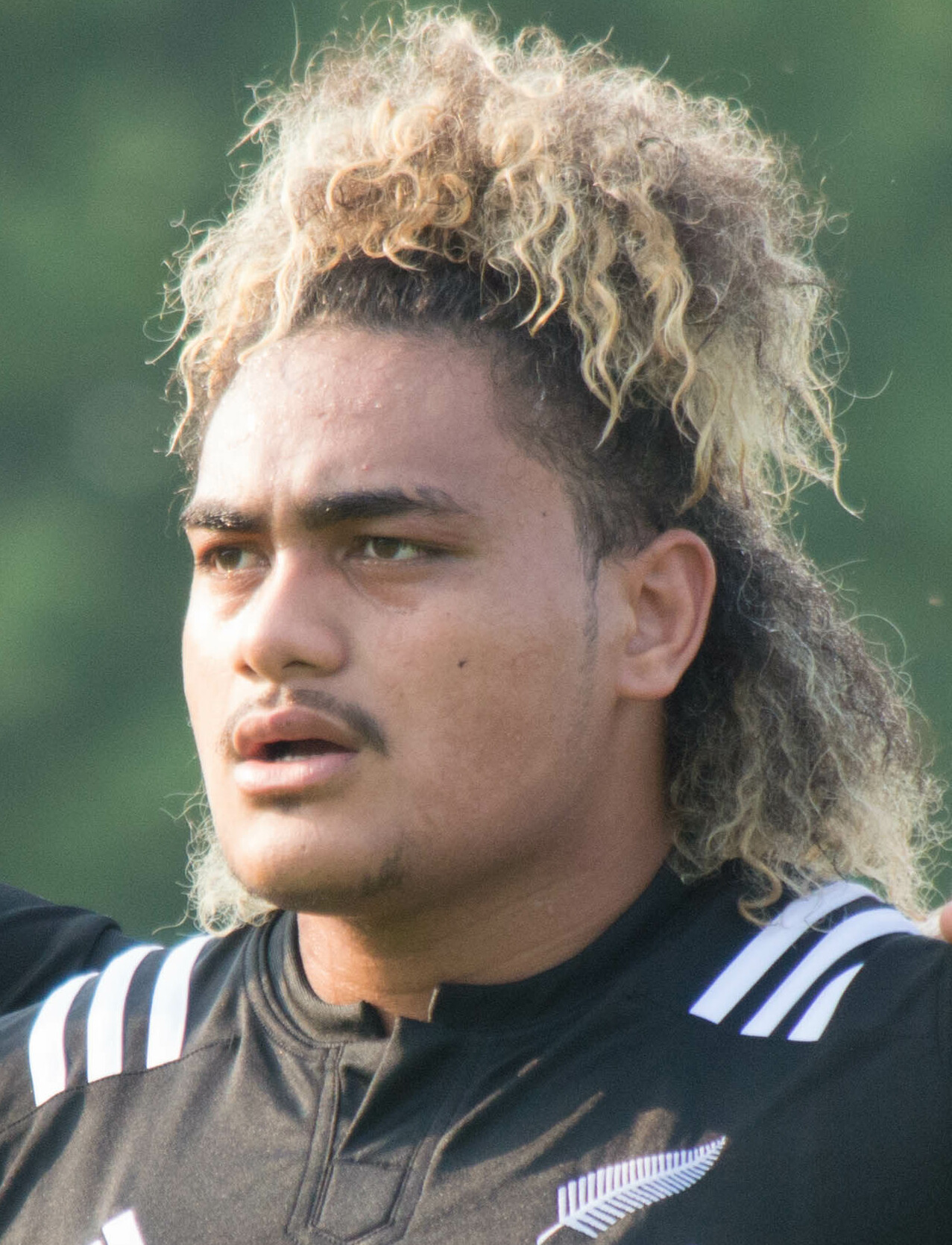
- Born: 10 January 1995 (age 31) Nukuʻalofa, Tonga
- Height: 185 cm (6 ft 1 in)
- Weight: 116 kg (256 lb; 18 st 4 lb)
- School: Māngere College
- Notable relative(s): Mofuike Tuʻungafasi (father); Ofa Tuʻungafasi (brother)

Rugby union career
- Position: Prop
- Current team: Northland
Senior career
Years	Team	Apps	(Points)
2015–2017	Auckland	19	(0)
2018–2019, 2024–	Northland	24	(0)
2019–2021	Crusaders	12	(0)
2020–2022	Tasman	22	(0)
2022–	Moana Pasifika	7	(0)
2023	Hawke's Bay	3	(0)
- Correct as of 5 September 2024
International career
Years	Team	Apps	(Points)
2015	New Zealand U20	7	(0)
- Correct as of 5 September 2024

Isileli J. Tuʻungafasi (born 10 January 1995) is a Tongan born New Zealand rugby union player, who currently plays for Northland in the Bunnings NPC. He previously played for Moana Pasifika in Super Rugby. His position is prop. He is the brother of Ofa Tuʻungafasi, another rugby union player.

== Career ==
Tuʻungafasi started his career playing for Auckland playing 19 games across 3 seasons before he moved north to Northland where he played another 21 games. He was a late addition to the Crusaders squad for round 6 of the 2019 Super Rugby season. In 2020 he was named in the Crusaders squad. He moved Mitre 10 Cup teams again for the 2020 Mitre 10 Cup, this time to Tasman making his debut for the Mako in Round 1 against Counties Manukau. The Mako went on to win the premiership title in 2020 for the second time in a row. Tuʻungafasi played only 2 games for the Crusaders during the 2021 season due to strong performances by fellow props Joe Moody, George Bower and Tamaiti Williams. In October 2021 Tuʻungafasi signed with Moana Pasifika for the 2022 Super Rugby Pacific season. He played a crucial role in the number 1 jersey for Tasman during the 2021 Bunnings NPC as the Mako made the final before losing 23–20 to Waikato. After being signed by the side in 2021 Tu'ungafasi finally made his debut for Moana Pasifika in Round 2 of the 2023 Super Rugby Pacific season against the Chiefs.
