= Luke Romano =

NZ rugby union player (born 1986)

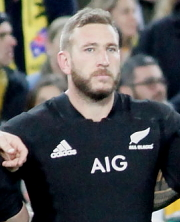
- Romano playing for New Zealand, August 2017
- Born: 16 February 1986 (age 40) Nelson, New Zealand
- Height: 199 cm (6 ft 6 in)
- Weight: 120 kg (265 lb; 18 st 13 lb)
- School: Christchurch Boys' High School

Rugby union career
- Position: Lock
- Current team: Canterbury, Blues
Senior career
Years	Team	Apps	(Points)
2009–22	Canterbury	77	(25)
2011–21	Crusaders	136	(40)
2022	Blues	15	(5)
- Correct as of 12 June 2022
International career
Years	Team	Apps	(Points)
2012–2017	New Zealand	31	(10)
- Correct as of 10 March 2022

Luke Romano (born 16 February 1986) is a New Zealand rugby union footballer who plays as a lock for the Blues in Super Rugby and Canterbury in the Mitre 10 Cup. He played for the All Blacks from 2012 - 2017 and was a key member of 2015 Rugby World Cup winning team.

== Career ==
Romano is a New Zealand international, making his debut on 23 June 2012 in a 60–0 win against Ireland in Hamilton. He currently has over 30 caps and has scored 2 tries.

Romano was a regular starter for the early stages of his international career, but missed many opportunities to play through injuries, which saw his starting spot taken by Brodie Retallick. Romano only played one international match in 2014, a 24-16 victory over Scotland off the bench. Romano's return from injury in 2015 saw him named in the 2015 Rugby World Cup. Romano earned starts against Namibia and Tonga in the tournament, with both fixtures being victories for New Zealand.

Romano had good form throughout Super Rugby in 2016, allowing him to start against Wales for the first test of the year. He missed the end-of-year fixtures, however, allowing Scott Barrett to make his debut for New Zealand after coming into the squad as injury cover for Romano and Sam Whitelock. After returning to rugby in the 2017 Brisbane Global Rugby Tens, Romano lost his regular starting spot in the Crusaders to Barrett in 2017. Romano started against the touring British and Irish Lions team in a 3-12 loss that year; however, due to Barrett's injury. Romano reverted to a regular role off the bench upon Barrett's return from injury and was used as a replacement in all three of the knockout rounds of the 2017 Super Rugby season, including the 25-17 winning final against the Lions.

Romano was retained for the 2017 Rugby Championship and was used as a replacement in the record 54-34 win over Australia to open the competition. Romano went on to make five more appearances for the All Blacks in 2017, starting in all of them after Retallick opted not to play any more rugby in 2017 for personal reasons. Those fixtures were two wins against Argentina in the Rugby Championship and against the Barbarians, France and Scotland on the end-of-year tour.

The test cap against Scotland on 19 November 2017 was Romano’s last All Black appearance, as he was ruled out for the year's final test against Wales due to illness and not selected for the All Blacks in the 2018 or subsequent seasons.

In 2022, the 35-year-old Romano was not reselected for the Crusaders team. He was instead picked up by the rival Blues to bolster the number of experienced players in their line-up. On 15 April 2022, he helped the Blues to their first win over his old team the Crusaders at Christchurch in 18 years.

Romano continues to play for the Canterbury NPC team.

== Personal life ==
Romano did not play international rugby for the Autumn Internationals in 2016 due to the death of a relative. Romano is a qualified builder, and he is of Italian heritage through his grandfather. Romano is married and has two sons.
