= Sam Cane =

NZ international rugby union player

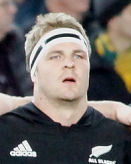
- Cane representing New Zealand during the 2019 Rugby World Cup
- Full name: Samuel Jordan Cane
- Born: 13 January 1992 (age 34) Rotorua, New Zealand
- Height: 1.89 m (6 ft 2 in)
- Weight: 108 kg (238 lb; 17 st 0 lb)
- School: Tauranga Boys' College

Rugby union career
- Position(s): Flanker, Number 8
- Current team: Suntory Sungoliath
Senior career
Years	Team	Apps	(Points)
2010–2023	Bay of Plenty	21	(25)
2011–2023	Chiefs	150	(85)
2023–	Suntory Sungoliath	34	(40)
- Correct as of 3 November 2024
International career
Years	Team	Apps	(Points)
2011	New Zealand U20	4	(15)
2012–2024	New Zealand	104	(85)
- Correct as of 9 November 2024
Medal record
Men's Rugby union
Representing New Zealand
Rugby World Cup
Gold medal – first place	2015 England	Squad
Silver medal – second place	2023 France	Squad
Bronze medal – third place	2019 Japan	Squad

Samuel Jordan Cane (born 13 January 1992) is a New Zealand rugby union player who plays as a flanker for the Japan Rugby League One club Tokyo Sungoliath. He is also the former captain of the New Zealand national team.

He made his debut for the All Blacks in 2012 and succeeded Kieran Read as the All Blacks captain on 5 May 2020. He has represented the Chiefs in Super Rugby, Bay of Plenty in the National Provincial Championship and King Country in the Heartland Championship.

== Early life ==
Cane was born on 13 January 1992, to father Malcolm and mother Kathy, in Rotorua. Cane's maternal grandfather, Dirk, and four brothers fled the Netherlands and Europe due to the horrors of World War II for a fresh start in New Zealand. He grew up in Reporoa, a town halfway between Rotorua and Taupo. Cane was a player for Reporoa Rugby Club, with his father coaching him through the junior teams until young Sam made Reporoa College's first XV at age 14.

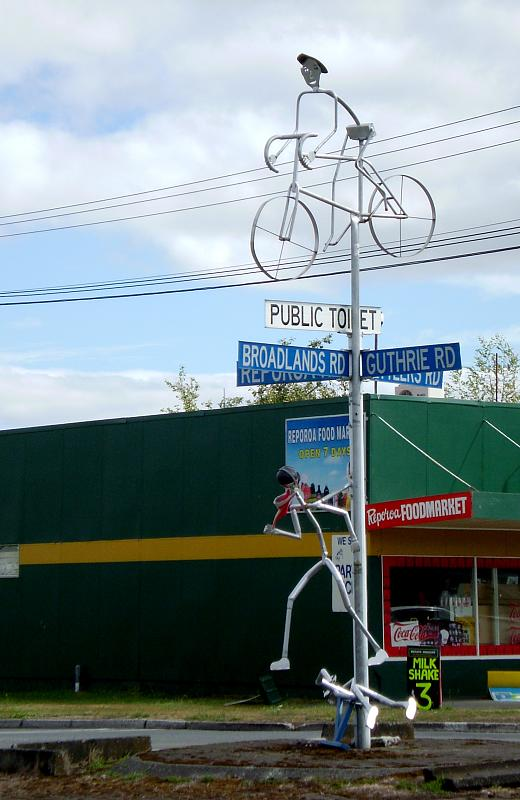
Sign and sculpture in Reporoa, where Cane grew up.

The Bay of Plenty Rugby Union, however, wanted Cane to be closer to them so he switched to Tauranga Boys’ school for his final year in 2009. He made NZ Schools along with future All Blacks TJ Perenara, Lima Sopoaga, Charles Piutau, Steven Luatua and Codie Taylor.

== Club career ==
Cane made his Super Rugby debut for the Chiefs in 2010 at just 18 years old followed by his provincial debut for Bay of Plenty later that year.

Cane was retained as the Chiefs' co-captain by new head coach Colin Cooper for the 2018 Super Rugby season, with departing midfielder Charlie Ngatai selected as the other captain. He performed incredibly in the Chiefs' first few games of 2018, including the opening game on 24 February 2018. In the first half, Cane outsprinted Crusaders winger George Bridge to score a solo try 50m from the goal posts. The Chiefs lost 45–23.

Cane announced that he was taking an offshore playing break in Japan at the end of 2023. He was replaced as Chiefs co-captain by Luke Jacobson. The Chiefs managed to qualify for the 2024 Super Rugby final, where they lost to the Blues 41–10.

== International career ==
=== 2011–2014: Debut and growing recognition ===
Cane represented New Zealand Under-20 in the 2011 IRB Junior World Championship.

In 2012 he made his international debut for New Zealand, in the second match of a three match series against Ireland. His starting debut came in the final match of the series in front of his home crowd in Hamilton, giving a stand out performance that included 16 tackles and two tries. Cane made another three test appearances that year.

Cane was a regular starter for the All Blacks during 2013 due largely to All Black captain Richie McCaw being on sabbatical. Cane was one of the team's top try-scorers in 2013 scoring his fifth try of the year on 2 November when the All Blacks beat Japan 54–6. Cane also received the first yellow card of his international career in the final minute of that game.

=== 2015–2017: Involvement in 2015 Rugby World Cup win and injury woes ===
He was a key member of 2015 Rugby World Cup winning team, where he captained the side to a comfortable 58 - 14 win over Namibia. Cane came off the bench in the knockout rounds of the World Cup, replacing retiring All Blacks captain Richie McCaw in the last minute of the 34–17 victory over Australia in the tournament final on 31 October 2015.

Following Richie McCaw's retirement, Cane became an established member of the Chiefs and All Blacks leadership groups, being named as co-captain of the Chiefs alongside Aaron Cruden. Cane became a regular starter for the All Blacks in 2016, starting in all three tests of the 2016 Steinlager series against Wales. Although he had a sub-par game in the third test, receiving the second yellow card of his career, the All Blacks would go on to win the series 3–0.

2016 was a mixed season for Cane, largely due to injury and having to lend his starting jersey to Matt Todd and rookie Ardie Savea. Cane captained the All Blacks for the second time in his career, playing a full 80 minutes as captain during a 68–10 win over Italy on 12 November 2016. Cane only lasted 18 minutes the following week against Ireland, leaving the field for a head injury assessment and being replaced by Savea for the rest of the 21–9 win.

The 2017 season was much better for Cane. He captained the Chiefs to the semi-finals of Super Rugby and was selected in the All Blacks' 33-man squad for the 2017 Pasifika Challenge against Samoa and the three-test series against the touring British and Irish Lions. Cane scored the final try of the 78–0 thrashing of Samoa and started in all three tests against the Lions, playing very well. He retained his spot as a regular starter for the 2017 Rugby Championship and began to play for the full 80 minutes more regularly, causing Savea to get less game time. Cane made five appearances for New Zealand on the 2017 end-of-season tour and scored two tries, making headlines alongside replacement prop Ofa Tu'ungafasi for great tackles in the third Bledisloe Cup, a 18–23 loss which was also his 50th cap.

On 18 November 2017, Cane became the third-to-most yellow-carded All Black in history, receiving the third of his career during a 22–17 win over Scotland. Cane made headlines again the following week for his work rate against Wales in the final test of the year, the All Blacks winning 33–18 after Cane and winger Rieko Ioane delivered standout performances. Cane was tipped by media to Captain the All Blacks for the third time in his career, against Wales, but lost out to outstanding Crusaders lock and 96-test veteran Sam Whitelock.

=== 2018-2020: Fluctuating form and defeat in the 2019 Rugby World Cup ===
Despite his promising initial start to the 2018 season, Cane fell back into his regular form pattern, with an injury-enforced lack of game time causing Cane to lose form. In the absence of injured All Blacks captain Kieran Read, Cane was named by All Blacks Head Coach Steve Hansen as one of two Vice-Captains for the 2018 Steinlager series against France, alongside outside back Ben Smith, with Sam Whitelock named as captain in Read's absence.

Cane was initially in doubt to play against France due to an abdominal injury, with Matt Todd called in as injury cover again, but managed to make the field on 9 June 2018 to play as the All Blacks beat France 52–11. Despite an outstanding team performance from the All Blacks, Cane's ill-discipline once again caused controversy. Cane and replacement prop Ofa Tu'ungafasi both tackled French winger Rémy Grosso high, causing a head clash between the three players. Grosso sustained two facial fractures, being ruled out of the rest of the series. Cane was also heavily penalised in the second test, a 26–13 win for the All Blacks. Cane was replaced by Ardie Savea only 43 minutes into the second test due to poor behaviour. Cane was subsequently dropped for the third test, with Savea starting in his place, with Matt Todd on the bench.

Following the Steinlager series against France, Cane lead the Chiefs to the Super Rugby quarter-finals, where they lost to the Hurricanes, 31–32. Cane then went on to play in five of the six fixtures, during the 2018 Rugby Championship. On 6 October 2018, Cane started in the final match of the Rugby Championship, against South Africa. Cane was only on the field for 36 minutes, before fracturing his neck during a collision with Springboks veteran loose forward Francois Louw. Cane was immediately replaced by Hurricanes loose forward, Ardie Savea, who went on to score the All Blacks' winning try, allowing them to beat South Africa 32–30.

Sam Cane was an integral member of the Rugby World Cup 2019 All Blacks squad, appearing in nearly all the matches, and eventually claimed third place in a win over Wales.

=== 2020-2024: Captaincy, Rugby World Cup and retirement ===
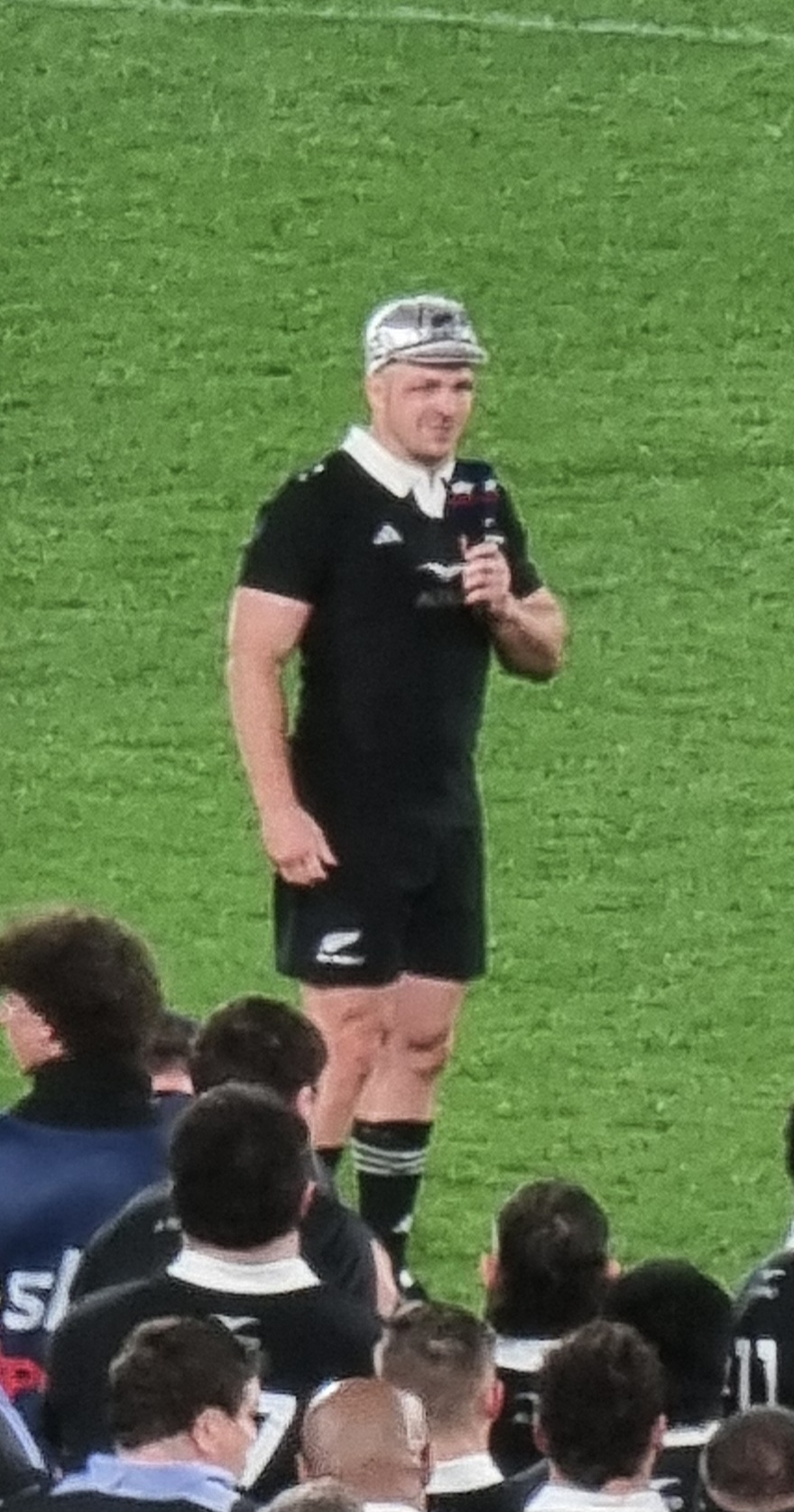
Cane being awarded his 100th cap on 28 September 2024.

Sam Cane replaced Kieran Read as captain of the All Blacks on 6 May 2020.

As captain from 2020 to 2023, Cane, along with the All Blacks more generally, experienced a turbulent World Cup cycle. As a result, heavy criticism was placed on his captaincy, alongside the coaching role of Ian Foster. This included a first series defeat to Ireland, and a 7–35 defeat to South Africa in 2023, which is the All Blacks worst defeat in history (surpassing Australia's 21–point victories over New Zealand in 1999 and 2019).

Cane captained the All Blacks at the 2023 Rugby World Cup and earned plaudits for his form throughout the tournament. He led his team to victory by 28–24 against Ireland in the quarter-final and a comprehensive 44–6 win over Argentina to secure a place in the 2023 Rugby World Cup final against South Africa. However, in the final he was red-carded in the 28th minute and forced to watch the rest of the game from the sideline as his team lost 11–12 to South Africa.

Although Cane remained contracted to NZ Rugby through to 2025, he took a sabbatical to play in Japan for Suntory Sungoliath rather than play in the 2024 Super Rugby Pacific season. In May 2024 Cane announced he would not seek to play for the All Blacks in the 2025 season and NZ Rugby had granted him an early release from his contract. He remained available, if selected, to play during the 2024 season but would not be the team captain. From 2025 he would play solely for his Sungoliath club in Japan. He played in 9 tests in 2024 including the end of season tour victories over Ireland and England.

=== 2025 onwards ===
In 2025 after his season with Tokyo Sungoliath he played for the Barbarians against South Africa.

== Personal life ==
Sam Cane met Harriet Allen in 2015 at a Hamilton bar when Harriet "confidently walked up to the rugby player and asked if he was single". They became engaged in 2018, and married each other in December 2019, sharing their vows in front of around 100 guests, including family, friends, and Cane's All Black teammates. In 2022, the couple announced the birth of their first child, Hudson George Cane, via Instagram. In 2024, they announced the birth of their second son, Reeve William Cane.

In an interview after the 2023 Rugby World Cup Final, Cane said that there were "obviously so many shit [sic] emotions, on a personal level and on behalf of the team", but added that he felt "a heck of a lot of pride with the way the boys fought out there tonight".

== Honours ==
New Zealand

- Rugby World Cup
  - Winner: 2015
  - Second-place: 2023
  - Third-place: 2019

New Zealand under-20

- World Rugby U20 Championship
  - Winner: 2011

Chiefs

- Super Rugby/Super Rugby Pacific
  - Winner: 2012, 2013
  - Runners-up: 2023, 2024

Individual

- Kelvin R Tremain Memorial Award: 2020
