= 2018 France rugby union tour of New Zealand =

- Coach: Jacques Brunel
- Tour captain: Mathieu Bastareaud
Summary
P	W	D	L
Total
3	0	0	3
Test match
3	0	0	3
Opponent
P	W	D	L
New Zealand
3	0	0	3

Tour chronology
- ← South Africa 2017 Australia 2021 →

In June 2018, France played a three-test series against New Zealand as part of the 2018 mid-year rugby union tests. The series was part of the sixth year of the global rugby calendar established by World Rugby, which runs through to 2019.

== Fixtures ==
Date	Venue	Home	Score	Away
9 June 2018	Eden Park, Auckland	New Zealand	52–11	France
16 June 2018	Wellington Regional Stadium, Wellington	New Zealand	26–13	France
23 June 2018	Forsyth Barr Stadium, Dunedin	New Zealand	49–14	France

== Squads ==
Note: Ages, caps and clubs are as per 9 June, the first test match of the tour.

=== France ===
On 22 May, Brunel named a 32-man squad ahead of France's three-test series against New Zealand.

On 27 May, Sébastien Taofifenua was called up to the squad to replace the injured Eddy Ben Arous.

On 10 June, Rémy Grosso was declared forfait for the rest of the tour.

Coaching team:

- Head coach: (France) Jacques Brunel
- Backs coach: (France) Jean-Baptiste Élissalde
- Forwards coach: (France) Sébastien Bruno
- Defence coach: (France) Julien Bonnaire

Note: Flags indicate national union for the club/province as defined by World Rugby.

Player	Position	Date of birth (age)	Caps	Club/province
Pierre Bougarit	Hooker	12 September 1997 (aged 20)	0	(France) La Rochelle
Camille Chat	Hooker	18 December 1995 (aged 22)	11	(France) Racing 92
Adrien Pélissié	Hooker	7 August 1990 (aged 27)	5	(France) Bordeaux Bègles
Uini Atonio	Prop	26 March 1990 (aged 28)	28	(France) La Rochelle
Cyril Baille	Prop	15 September 1993 (aged 24)	8	(France) Toulouse
Eddy Ben Arous	Prop	25 August 1990 (aged 27)	20	(France) Racing 92
Cedate Gomes Sa	Prop	7 August 1993 (aged 24)	5	(France) Racing 92
Dany Priso	Prop	2 January 1994 (aged 24)	4	(France) La Rochelle
Rabah Slimani	Prop	18 October 1989 (aged 28)	46	(France) Clermont Auvergne
Sébastien Taofifénua	Prop	21 March 1992 (aged 26)	2	(France) Bordeaux Bègles
Paul Gabrillagues	Lock	3 June 1993 (aged 25)	7	(France) Stade Français
Félix Lambey	Lock	15 March 1994 (aged 24)	0	(France) Lyon
Yoann Maestri	Lock	14 January 1988 (aged 30)	59	(France) Toulouse
Mathieu Babillot	Flanker	9 September 1993 (aged 24)	1	(France) Castres
Judicaël Cancoriet	Flanker	25 April 1996 (aged 22)	3	(France) Clermont Auvergne
Kevin Gourdon	Flanker	23 January 1990 (aged 28)	16	(France) La Rochelle
Alexandre Lapandry	Flanker	13 April 1989 (aged 29)	10	(France) Clermont Auvergne
Bernard Le Roux	Flanker	4 June 1989 (aged 29)	29	(France) Racing 92
Fabien Sanconnie	Flanker	21 February 1995 (aged 23)	3	(France) Brive
Kélian Galletier	Number 8	18 March 1992 (aged 26)	3	(France) Montpellier
Morgan Parra	Scrum-half	15 November 1988 (aged 29)	66	(France) Clermont Auvergne
Baptiste Serin	Scrum-half	20 June 1994 (aged 23)	17	(France) Bordeaux Bègles
Anthony Belleau	Fly-half	8 April 1996 (aged 22)	4	(France) Toulon
Jules Plisson	Fly-half	20 August 1991 (aged 26)	15	(France) Stade Français
Mathieu Bastareaud (c)	Centre	17 September 1988 (aged 29)	45	(France) Toulon
Geoffrey Doumayrou	Centre	16 September 1989 (aged 28)	6	(France) La Rochelle
Gaël Fickou	Centre	26 March 1994 (aged 24)	35	(France) Toulouse
Wesley Fofana	Centre	20 January 1988 (aged 30)	44	(France) Clermont Auvergne
Rémi Lamerat	Centre	14 January 1990 (aged 28)	18	(France) Clermont Auvergne
Benjamin Fall	Wing	3 March 1989 (aged 29)	10	(France) Montpellier
Rémy Grosso	Wing	4 December 1988 (aged 29)	4	(France) Clermont Auvergne
Teddy Thomas	Wing	18 September 1993 (aged 24)	10	(France) Racing 92
Hugo Bonneval	Fullback	19 November 1990 (aged 27)	11	(France) Toulon
Maxime Médard	Fullback	16 November 1986 (aged 31)	47	(France) Toulouse

=== New Zealand ===
On 20 May, Hansen named a 33-man squad ahead of the All Blacks' three-test June Series against France (9 June, 16 June, and 23 June).

Liam Coltman and Akira Ioane were included in the squad as precautionary injury cover.

On 1 June, Sonny Bill Williams was ruled out of the series due to a knee injury.

On 4 June, Tom Franklin, Luke Romano and Matt Todd were called up as injury cover, with Romano covering for Brodie Retallick who was ruled out of the first test.

All squad members play rugby in New Zealand.

Coaching team:

- Head coach: (New Zealand) Steve Hansen
- Attack coach: (New Zealand) Ian Foster
- Forwards coach: (New Zealand) Mike Cron
- Defence coach: (New Zealand) Scott McLeod

Player	Position	Date of birth (age)	Caps	Franchise/province
Nathan Harris	Hooker	8 March 1992 (aged 26)	11	Chiefs / Bay of Plenty
Codie Taylor	Hooker	31 March 1991 (aged 27)	29	Crusaders / Canterbury
Owen Franks	Prop	23 December 1987 (aged 30)	95	Crusaders / Canterbury
Joe Moody	Prop	18 September 1988 (aged 29)	31	Crusaders / Canterbury
Tim Perry	Prop	1 August 1988 (aged 29)	0	Crusaders / Tasman
Jeffery Toomaga-Allen	Prop	19 November 1990 (aged 27)	1	Hurricanes / Wellington
Karl Tu'inukuafe	Prop	21 February 1993 (aged 25)	0	Chiefs / North Harbour
Ofa Tu'ungafasi	Prop	19 April 1992 (aged 26)	14	Blues / Auckland
Scott Barrett	Lock	20 November 1993 (aged 24)	16	Crusaders / Taranaki
Tom Franklin	Lock	13 August 1990 (aged 27)	0	Highlanders / Otago
Brodie Retallick	Lock	31 May 1991 (aged 27)	68	Chiefs / Hawke's Bay
Luke Romano	Lock	16 February 1986 (aged 32)	31	Crusaders / Canterbury
Sam Whitelock (c)	Lock	12 October 1988 (aged 29)	96	Crusaders / Canterbury
Sam Cane	Flanker	13 January 1992 (aged 26)	53	Chiefs / Bay of Plenty
Vaea Fifita	Flanker	17 June 1992 (aged 25)	5	Hurricanes / Wellington
Shannon Frizell	Flanker	11 February 1994 (aged 24)	0	Highlanders / Tasman
Ardie Savea	Flanker	14 October 1993 (aged 24)	22	Hurricanes / Wellington
Liam Squire	Flanker	20 March 1991 (aged 27)	15	Highlanders / Tasman
Matt Todd	Flanker	24 March 1988 (aged 30)	13	Crusaders / Canterbury
Jordan Taufua	Number 8	29 January 1992 (aged 26)	0	Crusaders / Counties Manukau
Luke Whitelock	Number 8	29 January 1991 (aged 27)	2	Highlanders / Canterbury
TJ Perenara	Half-back	23 January 1992 (aged 26)	42	Hurricanes / Wellington
Aaron Smith	Half-back	21 November 1988 (aged 29)	71	Highlanders / Manawatu
Te Toiroa Tahuriorangi	Half-back	31 March 1995 (aged 23)	0	Chiefs / Taranaki
Beauden Barrett	First five-eighth	27 May 1991 (aged 27)	62	Hurricanes / Taranaki
Damian McKenzie	First five-eighth	25 April 1995 (aged 23)	12	Chiefs / Waikato
Richie Mo'unga	First five-eighth	25 May 1994 (aged 24)	0	Crusaders / Canterbury
Ryan Crotty	Centre	23 September 1988 (aged 29)	35	Crusaders / Canterbury
Jack Goodhue	Centre	13 July 1995 (aged 22)	0	Crusaders / Northland
Ngani Laumape	Centre	22 April 1993 (aged 25)	4	Hurricanes / Manawatu
Anton Lienert-Brown	Centre	15 April 1995 (aged 23)	22	Chiefs / Waikato
Sonny Bill Williams	Centre	3 August 1985 (aged 32)	46	Blues / Counties Manukau
Rieko Ioane	Wing	18 March 1997 (aged 21)	13	Blues / Auckland
Nehe Milner-Skudder	Wing	15 December 1990 (aged 27)	11	Hurricanes / Manawatu
Waisake Naholo	Wing	8 May 1991 (aged 27)	18	Highlanders / Taranaki
Jordie Barrett	Fullback	17 February 1997 (aged 21)	2	Hurricanes / Taranaki
Ben Smith	Fullback	1 June 1986 (aged 32)	64	Highlanders / Otago

== Matches ==
=== First test ===
9 June 2018
19:35 NZST (UTC+12)

New Zealand	52–11	France
Try: B. Barrett 21' m Taylor 52' c B. Smith 55' c Ioane (2) 61' m, 74' m McKenzie 63' m Laumape 66' m Savea 78' c Con: B. Barrett (3/8) 54', 57', 80'; Pen: B. Barrett (2/3) 13', 47'	Report	Try: Grosso 6' m Pen: Parra (2/3) 19', 35'

Eden Park, Auckland
Attendance: 45,850
Referee: Luke Pearce (England)

FB	15	Jordie Barrett	(substituted off) 60'
RW	14	Ben Smith
OC	13	Anton Lienert-Brown
IC	12	Ryan Crotty	(substituted off) 60'
LW	11	Rieko Ioane
FH	10	Beauden Barrett
SH	9	Aaron Smith	(substituted off) 65'
N8	8	Luke Whitelock	(substituted off) 72'
OF	7	Sam Cane	63' to 72'		(substituted off) 74'
BF	6	Liam Squire
RL	5	Scott Barrett
LL	4	Sam Whitelock (c)
TP	3	Owen Franks	(substituted off) 57'
HK	2	Codie Taylor	(substituted off) 65'
LP	1	Joe Moody	(substituted off) 45'
Replacements:
HK	16	Nathan Harris	(substituted on) 65'
PR	17	Karl Tu'inukuafe	(substituted on) 45'
PR	18	Ofa Tu'ungafasi	(substituted on) 57'
FL	19	Vaea Fifita	(substituted on) 72'
FL	20	Ardie Savea	(substituted on) 63'	(substituted off) 72'	(substituted on) 74'
SH	21	TJ Perenara	(substituted on) 65'
FH	22	Damian McKenzie	(substituted on) 60'
CE	23	Ngani Laumape	(substituted on) 60'
Coach:
(New Zealand) Steve Hansen

FB	15	Maxime Médard
RW	14	Teddy Thomas
OC	13	Mathieu Bastareaud (c)
IC	12	Geoffrey Doumayrou
LW	11	Rémy Grosso		(substituted off) 58'
FH	10	Anthony Belleau		(substituted off) 60'
SH	9	Morgan Parra		(substituted off) 60'
N8	8	Fabien Sanconnie
OF	7	Kevin Gourdon
BF	6	Judicaël Cancoriet		(substituted off) 60'
RL	5	Yoann Maestri
LL	4	Paul Gabrillagues	(yellow card) 50' to 60'	(substituted off) 68'
TP	3	Uini Atonio		(substituted off) 43'
HK	2	Camille Chat		(substituted off) 60'
LP	1	Dany Priso		(substituted off) 54'
Replacements:
HK	16	Adrien Pélissié		(substituted on) 60'
PR	17	Cyril Baille		(substituted on) 54'
PR	18	Rabah Slimani		(substituted on) 43'
FL	19	Bernard Le Roux		(substituted on) 68'
FL	20	Alexandre Lapandry		(substituted on) 60'
SH	21	Baptiste Serin		(substituted on) 60'
FH	22	Jules Plisson		(substituted on) 60'
CE	23	Gaël Fickou		(substituted on) 58'
Coach:
(France) Jacques Brunel

Man of the Match:
Codie Taylor (New Zealand)

Touch judges:
Angus Gardner (Australia)
John Lacey (Ireland)
Television match official:
George Ayoub (Australia)

Notes:

- Karl Tu'inukuafe (New Zealand) made his international debut.
- Beauden Barrett, Jordie Barrett and Scott Barrett became the first trio of brother to start in an All Blacks XV.

=== Second test ===
16 June 2018
19:35 NZST (UTC+12)

New Zealand	26–13	France
Try: Moody 12' c B. Smith 19' c J. Barrett (2) 39' c, 56' m Con: McKenzie (3/4) 13', 19', 40'	Report	Try: Gomes Sa 80' c Con: Plisson (1/1) 80'; Pen: Parra (2/2) 10', 30'

Westpac Stadium, Wellington
Attendance: 34,422
Referee: Angus Gardner (Australia)

FB	15	Jordie Barrett
RW	14	Ben Smith
OC	13	Anton Lienert-Brown		(substituted off) 57'	(substituted on) 71'
IC	12	Ryan Crotty			(substituted off) 71'
LW	11	Rieko Ioane
FH	10	Beauden Barrett		(substituted off) 11'
SH	9	Aaron Smith		(substituted off) 54'
N8	8	Luke Whitelock
OF	7	Sam Cane		(substituted off) 43'
BF	6	Liam Squire		(substituted off) 40'
RL	5	Scott Barrett
LL	4	Sam Whitelock (c)
TP	3	Owen Franks		(substituted off) 33'
HK	2	Codie Taylor		(substituted off) 50'
LP	1	Joe Moody		(substituted off) 45'
Replacements:
HK	16	Nathan Harris		(substituted on) 50'
PR	17	Karl Tu'inukuafe		(substituted on) 45'
PR	18	Ofa Tu'ungafasi		(substituted on) 33'
FL	19	Vaea Fifita		(substituted on) 40'
FL	20	Ardie Savea		(substituted on) 43'
SH	21	TJ Perenara	(yellow card) 62' to 72'	(substituted on) 54'
FH	22	Damian McKenzie		(substituted on) 11'
CE	23	Ngani Laumape		(substituted on) 57'
Coach:
(New Zealand) Steve Hansen

FB	15	Benjamin Fall	(red card) 11'
RW	14	Teddy Thomas
OC	13	Mathieu Bastareaud (c)
IC	12	Geoffrey Doumayrou		(substituted off) 61'
LW	11	Gaël Fickou
FH	10	Anthony Belleau		(substituted off) 71'
SH	9	Morgan Parra		(substituted off) 54'
N8	8	Kevin Gourdon
OF	7	Kélian Galletier		(substituted off) 64'
BF	6	Mathieu Babillot
RL	5	Yoann Maestri		(substituted off) 57'
LL	4	Bernard Le Roux
TP	3	Uini Atonio		(substituted off) 47'
HK	2	Camille Chat		(substituted off) 57'
LP	1	Dany Priso		(substituted off) 47'
Replacements:
HK	16	Pierre Bougarit		(substituted on) 57'
PR	17	Cyril Baille		(substituted on) 47'
PR	18	Cedate Gomes Sa		(substituted on) 47'
LK	19	Paul Gabrillagues		(substituted on) 57'
FL	20	Alexandre Lapandry		(substituted on) 64'
SH	21	Baptiste Serin		(substituted on) 54'
FH	22	Jules Plisson		(substituted on) 71'
FB	23	Maxime Médard		(substituted on) 61'
Coach:
(France) Jacques Brunel

Man of the Match:
Jordie Barrett (New Zealand)

Touch judges:
John Lacey (Ireland)
Luke Pearce (England)
Television match official:
George Ayoub (Australia)

Notes:

- Pierre Bougarit (France) made his international debut.
- New Zealand retain the Dave Gallaher Trophy.

=== Third test ===
23 June 2018
19:35 NZST (UTC+12)

New Zealand	49–14	France
Try: B. Smith 15' c Todd 22' c McKenzie (2) 31' c, 46' c Ioane (3) 52' c, 58' c, 64' c Con: McKenzie (7/7) 16', 23', 32', 47', 53', 59', 65'		Try: Serin 11' c Fofana 27' c Con: Belleau (2/2) 12', 28'

Forsyth Barr Stadium, Dunedin
Attendance: 30,000
Referee: John Lacey (Ireland)

FB	15	Ben Smith
RW	14	Waisake Naholo
OC	13	Jack Goodhue
IC	12	Sonny Bill Williams	(substituted off) 57'
LW	11	Rieko Ioane
FH	10	Damian McKenzie	(substituted off) 69'
SH	9	Aaron Smith	(substituted off) 63'
N8	8	Luke Whitelock
OF	7	Ardie Savea	21' to 30'
BF	6	Shannon Frizell
RL	5	Scott Barrett
LL	4	Sam Whitelock (c)			(substituted off) 69'
TP	3	Owen Franks	(substituted off) 45'
HK	2	Codie Taylor	(substituted off) 71'
LP	1	Joe Moody	(substituted off) 63'
Replacements:
HK	16	Liam Coltman	(substituted on) 71'
PR	17	Karl Tu'inukuafe	(substituted on) 63'
PR	18	Ofa Tu'ungafasi	(substituted on) 45'
LK	19	Jackson Hemopo	(substituted on) 21'	(substituted off) 30'	(substituted on) 69'
FL	20	Matt Todd	(substituted on) 16'
SH	21	TJ Perenara	(substituted on) 63'
FH	22	Richie Mo'unga	(substituted on) 69'
FB	23	Jordie Barrett	(substituted on) 57'
Coach:
(New Zealand) Steve Hansen

FB	15	Benjamin Fall	(substituted off) 47'	(substituted on) 59'
RW	14	Teddy Thomas			(substituted off) 63'
OC	13	Rémi Lamerat	(substituted off) 74'
IC	12	Wesley Fofana
LW	11	Gaël Fickou
FH	10	Anthony Belleau
SH	9	Morgan Parra (c)	(substituted off) 7'
N8	8	Kevin Gourdon	(substituted off) 50'
OF	7	Kélian Galletier
BF	6	Mathieu Babillot
RL	5	Yoann Maestri
LL	4	Bernard Le Roux	(substituted off) 63'
TP	3	Uini Atonio	(substituted off) 50'
HK	2	Camille Chat	44' to 48'		(substituted off) 63'
LP	1	Dany Priso	(substituted off) 50'
Replacements:
HK	16	Adrien Pélissié	(substituted on) 44'	(substituted off) 48'	(substituted on) 63'
PR	17	Cyril Baille	(substituted on) 50'
PR	18	Cedate Gomes Sa	(substituted on) 50'
LK	19	Félix Lambey	(substituted on) 63'
FL	20	Alexandre Lapandry	(substituted on) 50'
SH	21	Baptiste Serin	(substituted on) 7'
FH	22	Jules Plisson	(substituted on) 74'
FB	23	Maxime Médard	(substituted on) 47'	(substituted off) 59'	(substituted on) 63'
Coach:
(France) Jacques Brunel

Man of the Match:
Scott Barrett (New Zealand)

Touch judges:
Angus Gardner (Australia)
Graham Cooper (Australia)
Television match official:
George Ayoub (Australia)

Notes:

- Shannon Frizell, Jack Goodhue, Jackson Hemopo and Richie Mo'unga (all New Zealand) and Félix Lambey (France) made their international debuts.

== See also ==
- 2018 mid-year rugby union internationals
