= 2018 Six Nations Championship =

Rugby union competition in Europe

- Date: 3 February – 17 March 2018
- Countries: England; France; Ireland; Italy; Scotland; Wales

Tournament statistics
- Champions: Ireland (14th title)
- Grand Slam: Ireland (3rd title)
- Triple Crown: Ireland (11th title)
- Matches played: 15
- Attendance: 991,844 (66,123 per match)
- Tries scored: 78 (5.2 per match)
- Top point scorer: (France) Maxime Machenaud (50)
- Top try scorer: (Ireland) Jacob Stockdale (7) (Note: This is a record for the most tries scored in a single Championship in the Six Nations era. The overall record is 8 by Cyril Lowe in 1914 and Ian Smith in 1925.)
- Player of the tournament: (Ireland) Jacob Stockdale
- Official website: sixnationsrugby.com

The 2018 Six Nations Championship (known as the Natwest 6 Nations for sponsorship reasons) was the 19th Six Nations Championship, the annual international rugby union tournament for the six major European rugby union nations.

The championship was contested by France, Ireland, Italy, Scotland, Wales and defending champions England. Including the competition's previous iterations as the Home Nations Championship and Five Nations Championship, it was the 124th edition of the tournament.

The Championship was won by Ireland on 10 March 2018, with their four wins (three with try bonus points) from the first four matches sufficient to place them out of reach of the other participants ahead of the final round. This was the third tournament running where the championship and Wooden Spoon had been decided by the end of round four. After a 24–15 victory against England on the final day, Ireland secured a Grand Slam, their third ever, alongside a Triple Crown.

== Participants ==
Nation	Stadium			Head coach	Captain
Nation	Home stadium	Capacity	Location	Head coach	Captain
England	Twickenham Stadium	82,000	London	(Australia) Eddie Jones	Dylan Hartley ^{1}
France	Stade de France	81,338	Saint-Denis	(France) Jacques Brunel	Guilhem Guirado ^{2}
France	Stade Vélodrome	67,394	Marseille	(France) Jacques Brunel	Guilhem Guirado ^{2}
Ireland	Aviva Stadium	51,700	Dublin	(New Zealand) Joe Schmidt	Rory Best
Italy	Stadio Olimpico	73,261	Rome	(Ireland) Conor O'Shea	Sergio Parisse
Scotland	Murrayfield Stadium	67,144	Edinburgh	(Scotland) Gregor Townsend	John Barclay
Wales	Millennium Stadium	74,500	Cardiff	(New Zealand) Warren Gatland	Alun Wyn Jones ^{3}

^{1} Dylan Hartley was ruled out of round 4 due to injury, and Owen Farrell captained England in his absence.
^{2} Guilhem Guirado was ruled out of round 5 due to injury, and Mathieu Bastareaud captained France in his absence. ^{3} Alun Wyn Jones was dropped from the match-day team to play Italy in round 4, and Taulupe Faletau captained Wales in his absence.

== Table ==
Pos	Team	Pld	W	D	L	PF	PA	PD	TF	TA	GS	TB	LB	Pts
1	Ireland	5	5	0	0	160	82	+78	20	11	3	3	0	26
2	Wales	5	3	0	2	119	83	+36	13	11	0	2	1	15
3	Scotland	5	3	0	2	101	128	−27	11	14	0	1	0	13
4	France	5	2	0	3	108	94	+14	8	6	0	0	3	11
5	England	5	2	0	3	102	92	+10	14	9	0	1	1	10
6	Italy	5	0	0	5	92	203	−111	12	27	0	0	1	1

Source: ESPN

Table ranking rules

- Four match points are awarded for a win.
- Two match points are awarded for a draw.
- A bonus match point is awarded to a team that scores four or more tries in a match or loses a match by seven points or fewer. If a team scores four tries in a match and loses by seven points or fewer, they are awarded both bonus points.
- Three bonus match points are awarded to a team that wins all five of their matches (known as a Grand Slam). This ensures that a Grand Slam winning team always ranks over a team who won four matches in which they also were awarded four try bonus points and were also awarded two bonus points in the match that they lost.
- Tiebreakers –
  - If two or more teams be tied on match points, the team with the better points difference (points scored less points conceded) is ranked higher.
  - If the above tiebreaker fails to separate tied teams, the team that scored the higher number of total tries in their matches is ranked higher.
  - If two or more teams remain tied for first place at the end of the championship after applying the above tiebreakers, the title is shared between them.

== Fixtures ==
The fixtures were announced on 16 May 2017. France hosted games in more than one venue, with their Friday night game against Italy taking place at the Stade Vélodrome, Marseille.

=== Round 1 ===
3 February 2018
14:15 GMT (UTC+0)

(1 BP) Wales	34–7	Scotland
Try: G. Davies 6' c Halfpenny (2) 12' c, 61' c S. Evans 73' c Con: Halfpenny (4/4) 8', 13', 63', 74'; Pen: Halfpenny (2/2) 44', 49'	Report	Try: Horne 79' c Con: Russell (1/1) 79'

Millennium Stadium, Cardiff
Attendance: 74,169
Referee: Pascal Gaüzère (France)

FB	15	Leigh Halfpenny
RW	14	Josh Adams
OC	13	Scott Williams	(substituted off) 71'
IC	12	Hadleigh Parkes
LW	11	Steff Evans
FH	10	Rhys Patchell	(substituted off) 63'
SH	9	Gareth Davies	(substituted off) 66'
N8	8	Ross Moriarty	(substituted off) 65'
OF	7	Josh Navidi
BF	6	Aaron Shingler
RL	5	Alun Wyn Jones (c)
LL	4	Cory Hill	(substituted off) 56'
TP	3	Samson Lee	(substituted off) 51'
HK	2	Ken Owens	(substituted off) 63'
LP	1	Rob Evans	(substituted off) 51'
Replacements:
HK	16	Elliot Dee	(substituted on) 63'
PR	17	Wyn Jones	(substituted on) 51'
PR	18	Tomas Francis	(substituted on) 51'
LK	19	Bradley Davies	(substituted on) 56'
FL	20	Justin Tipuric	(substituted on) 65'
SH	21	Aled Davies	(substituted on) 66'
FH	22	Gareth Anscombe	(substituted on) 63'
CE	23	Owen Watkin	(substituted on) 71'
Coach:
Warren Gatland

FB	15	Stuart Hogg
RW	14	Tommy Seymour
OC	13	Chris Harris	(substituted off) 55'
IC	12	Huw Jones
LW	11	Byron McGuigan	(substituted off) 55'
FH	10	Finn Russell
SH	9	Ali Price	(substituted off) 49'
N8	8	Cornell du Preez	(substituted off) 49'
OF	7	Hamish Watson
BF	6	John Barclay (c)
RL	5	Jonny Gray
LL	4	Ben Toolis	(substituted off) 55'
TP	3	Jon Welsh	(substituted off) 65'
HK	2	Stuart McInally	(substituted off) 70'
LP	1	Gordon Reid	(substituted off) 49'	(substituted on) 76'
Replacements:
HK	16	Scott Lawson	(substituted on) 70'
PR	17	Jamie Bhatti	(substituted on) 49'	(substituted off) 76'
PR	18	Murray McCallum	(substituted on) 65'
LK	19	Grant Gilchrist	(substituted on) 55'
N8	20	Ryan Wilson	(substituted on) 49'
SH	21	Greig Laidlaw	(substituted on) 49'
FH	22	Peter Horne	(substituted on) 55'
WG	23	Sean Maitland	(substituted on) 55'
Coach:
Gregor Townsend

Man of the Match:
Aaron Shingler (Wales)

Touch judges:
Romain Poite (France)
Matthew Carley (England)
Television match official:
David Grashoff (England)

Notes:

- Josh Adams (Wales) and Murray McCallum (Scotland) made their international debuts.
- This was Wales' first try bonus point in the Six Nations.

3 February 2018
17:45 CET (UTC+1)

(1 BP) France	13–15	Ireland
Try: Thomas 72' c Con: Belleau (1/1) 74'; Pen: Machenaud (2/2) 36', 54'	Report	Pen: Sexton (4/5) 3', 22', 39', 47'; Drop: Sexton (1/1) 80+3'

Stade de France, Saint-Denis
Attendance: 74,878
Referee: Nigel Owens (Wales)

FB	15	Geoffrey Palis
RW	14	Teddy Thomas
OC	13	Rémi Lamerat
IC	12	Henry Chavancy
LW	11	Virimi Vakatawa
FH	10	Matthieu Jalibert	(substituted off) 30'
SH	9	Maxime Machenaud	(substituted off) 67'	(substituted on) 76'
N8	8	Kevin Gourdon
OF	7	Yacouba Camara
BF	6	Wenceslas Lauret	(substituted off) 67'
RL	5	Sébastien Vahaamahina
LL	4	Arthur Iturria	(substituted off) 61'
TP	3	Rabah Slimani	(substituted off) 55'
HK	2	Guilhem Guirado (c)	(substituted off) 74'
LP	1	Jefferson Poirot	(substituted off) 55'
Replacements:
HK	16	Adrien Pélissié	(substituted on) 74'
PR	17	Dany Priso	(substituted on) 55'
PR	18	Cedate Gomes Sa	(substituted on) 55'
LK	19	Paul Gabrillagues	(substituted on) 61'
N8	20	Marco Tauleigne	(substituted on) 67'
SH	21	Antoine Dupont	(substituted on) 67'	(substituted off) 76'
FH	22	Anthony Belleau	(substituted on) 30'
WG	23	Benjamin Fall
Coach:
Jacques Brunel

FB	15	Rob Kearney
RW	14	Keith Earls
OC	13	Robbie Henshaw
IC	12	Bundee Aki
LW	11	Jacob Stockdale	(substituted off) 75'
FH	10	Johnny Sexton
SH	9	Conor Murray
N8	8	CJ Stander
OF	7	Josh van der Flier	(substituted off) 37'
BF	6	Peter O'Mahony
RL	5	James Ryan	(substituted off) 68'
LL	4	Iain Henderson
TP	3	Tadhg Furlong	(substituted off) 70'
HK	2	Rory Best (c)	(substituted off) 68'
LP	1	Cian Healy	(substituted off) 61'
Replacements:
HK	16	Seán Cronin	(substituted on) 68'
PR	17	Jack McGrath	(substituted on) 61'
PR	18	John Ryan	(substituted on) 70'
LK	19	Devin Toner	(substituted on) 68'
FL	20	Dan Leavy	(substituted on) 37'
SH	21	Luke McGrath
FH	22	Joey Carbery
WG	23	Fergus McFadden	(substituted on) 75'
Coach:
Joe Schmidt

Man of the Match:
Guilhem Guirado (France)

Touch judges:
Wayne Barnes (England)
Paul Williams (New Zealand)
Television match official:
Rowan Kitt (England)

Notes:

- Matthieu Jalibert, Geoffrey Palis, Adrien Pélissié, Dany Priso, Cedate Gomes Sa and Marco Tauleigne (all France) made their international debuts.

4 February 2018
16:00 CET (UTC+1)

Italy	15–46	England (1 BP)
Try: Benvenuti 20' c Bellini 58' m Con: Allan (1/2) 22'; Pen: Allan (1/1) 39'	Report	Try: Watson (2) 3' m, 11' m Farrell 26' c Simmonds (2) 52' c, 75' c Ford 68' c Nowell 77' m Con: Farrell (4/7) 27', 53', 69', 76'; Pen: Farrell (1/1) 47'

Stadio Olimpico, Rome
Attendance: 61,464
Referee: Mathieu Raynal (France)

FB	15	Matteo Minozzi
RW	14	Tommaso Benvenuti
OC	13	Tommaso Boni		(substituted off) 80'
IC	12	Tommaso Castello	(substituted off) 73'	(substituted on) 80'
LW	11	Mattia Bellini
FH	10	Tommaso Allan	(substituted off) 73'
SH	9	Marcello Violi	(substituted off) 63'
N8	8	Sergio Parisse (c)
OF	7	Renato Giammarioli	(substituted off) 50'
BF	6	Sebastian Negri
RL	5	Dean Budd	(substituted off) 61'
LL	4	Alessandro Zanni
TP	3	Simone Ferrari	(substituted off) 54'
HK	2	Leonardo Ghiraldini	(substituted off) 54'
LP	1	Andrea Lovotti	(substituted off) 41'
Replacements:
HK	16	Luca Bigi	(substituted on) 54'
PR	17	Nicola Quaglio	(substituted on) 41'
PR	18	Tiziano Pasquali	(substituted on) 54'
LK	19	George Biagi	(substituted on) 61'
FL	20	Maxime Mbanda	(substituted on) 50'
SH	21	Edoardo Gori	(substituted on) 63'
FH	22	Carlo Canna	(substituted on) 73'
FB	23	Jayden Hayward	(substituted on) 73'
Coach:
Conor O'Shea

FB	15	Mike Brown	(substituted off) 61'
RW	14	Anthony Watson
OC	13	Ben Te'o	(substituted off) 59'
IC	12	Owen Farrell
LW	11	Jonny May
FH	10	George Ford
SH	9	Ben Youngs	(substituted off) 10'
N8	8	Sam Simmonds
OF	7	Chris Robshaw	(substituted off) 67'
BF	6	Courtney Lawes	(substituted off) 59'
RL	5	Maro Itoje
LL	4	Joe Launchbury
TP	3	Dan Cole	(substituted off) 54'
HK	2	Dylan Hartley (c)	(substituted off) 54'
LP	1	Mako Vunipola	(substituted off) 73'
Replacements:
HK	16	Jamie George	(substituted on) 54'
PR	17	Alec Hepburn	(substituted on) 73'
PR	18	Harry Williams	(substituted on) 54'
LK	19	George Kruis	(substituted on) 59'
FL	20	Sam Underhill	(substituted on) 67'
SH	21	Danny Care	(substituted on) 10'
CE	22	Jonathan Joseph	(substituted on) 59'
WG	23	Jack Nowell	(substituted on) 61'
Coach:
Eddie Jones

Man of the Match:
Anthony Watson (England)

Touch judges:
Jérôme Garcès (France)
Nic Berry (Australia)
Television match official:
Glenn Newman (New Zealand)

Notes:

- Alessandro Zanni (Italy) became the seventh Italian international to earn his 100th test cap.
- Alec Hepburn (England) made his international debut.

=== Round 2 ===
10 February 2018
14:15 GMT (UTC+0)

(1 BP) Ireland	56–19	Italy
Try: Henshaw (2) 11' c, 44' c Murray 14' c Aki 21' c Earls 35' c Best 53' c Stockdale (2) 60' c, 70' c Con: Sexton (5/5) 12', 16', 22', 37', 45'; Carbery (3/3) 54', 61', 71'	Report	Try: Allan 56' c Gori 66' c Minozzi 75' m Con: Allan (2/3) 58', 66'

Aviva Stadium, Dublin
Attendance: 51,700
Referee: Romain Poite (France)

FB	15	Rob Kearney
RW	14	Keith Earls
OC	13	Robbie Henshaw	(substituted off) 45'
IC	12	Bundee Aki
LW	11	Jacob Stockdale
FH	10	Johnny Sexton	(substituted off) 51'
SH	9	Conor Murray	(substituted off) 51'
N8	8	Jack Conan	(substituted off) 41'
OF	7	Dan Leavy
BF	6	Peter O'Mahony
RL	5	Devin Toner
LL	4	Iain Henderson	(substituted off) 41'
TP	3	Tadhg Furlong	(substituted off) 4'
HK	2	Rory Best (c)	(substituted off) 61'
LP	1	Jack McGrath	(substituted off) 68'
Replacements:
HK	16	Seán Cronin	(substituted on) 61'
PR	17	Cian Healy	(substituted on) 68'
PR	18	Andrew Porter	(substituted on) 4'
LK	19	Quinn Roux	(substituted on) 41'
N8	20	CJ Stander	(substituted on) 41'
SH	21	Kieran Marmion	(substituted on) 51'
FH	22	Joey Carbery	(substituted on) 51'
FB	23	Jordan Larmour	(substituted on) 45'
Coach:
Joe Schmidt

FB	15	Matteo Minozzi
RW	14	Tommaso Benvenuti
OC	13	Tommaso Boni	(substituted off) 54'
IC	12	Tommaso Castello
LW	11	Mattia Bellini
FH	10	Tommaso Allan
SH	9	Marcello Violi	(substituted off) 58'
N8	8	Sergio Parisse (c)
OF	7	Braam Steyn	(substituted off) 45'
BF	6	Sebastian Negri	(substituted off) 58'
RL	5	Dean Budd
LL	4	Alessandro Zanni
TP	3	Simone Ferrari	(substituted off) 54'
HK	2	Luca Bigi	(substituted off) 45'
LP	1	Nicola Quaglio	(substituted off) 37'
Replacements:
HK	16	Leonardo Ghiraldini	(substituted on) 45'
PR	17	Andrea Lovotti	(substituted on) 37'
PR	18	Tiziano Pasquali	(substituted on) 54'
LK	19	Federico Ruzza	(substituted on) 58'
FL	20	Maxime Mbanda	(substituted on) 45'
SH	21	Edoardo Gori	(substituted on) 58'
FH	22	Carlo Canna
FB	23	Jayden Hayward	(substituted on) 54'
Coach:
Conor O'Shea

Man of the Match:
Conor Murray (Ireland)

Touch judges:
Pascal Gaüzère (France)
Matthew Carley (England)
Television match official:
David Grashoff (England)

Notes:

- Jordan Larmour (Ireland) made his international debut.
- This was Ireland's 300th Test win.

10 February 2018
16:45 GMT (UTC+0)

England	12–6	Wales (1 BP)
Try: May (2) 3' m, 20' c Con: Farrell (1/2) 21'	Report	Pen: Patchell (1/2) 24'; Anscombe (1/1) 77'

Twickenham Stadium, London
Attendance: 82,000
Referee: Jérôme Garcès (France)

FB	15	Mike Brown
RW	14	Anthony Watson	(substituted off) 45'
OC	13	Jonathan Joseph
IC	12	Owen Farrell
LW	11	Jonny May
FH	10	George Ford	(substituted off) 68'
SH	9	Danny Care	(substituted off) 65'
N8	8	Sam Simmonds	(substituted off) 41'
OF	7	Chris Robshaw
BF	6	Courtney Lawes
RL	5	Maro Itoje
LL	4	Joe Launchbury	(substituted off) 68'
TP	3	Dan Cole	(substituted off) 65'
HK	2	Dylan Hartley (c)	(substituted off) 1'	(substituted on) 11'	(substituted off) 52'
LP	1	Mako Vunipola	(substituted off) 77'
Replacements:
HK	16	Jamie George	(substituted on) 1'	(substituted off) 11'	(substituted on) 52'
PR	17	Alec Hepburn	(substituted on) 77'
PR	18	Harry Williams	(substituted on) 65'
LK	19	George Kruis	(substituted on) 68'
FL	20	Sam Underhill	(substituted on) 41'
SH	21	Richard Wigglesworth	(substituted on) 65'
CE	22	Ben Te'o	(substituted on) 68'
WG	23	Jack Nowell	(substituted on) 45'
Coach:
Eddie Jones

FB	15	Gareth Anscombe
RW	14	Josh Adams
OC	13	Scott Williams
IC	12	Hadleigh Parkes
LW	11	Steff Evans
FH	10	Rhys Patchell	(substituted off) 56'
SH	9	Gareth Davies	(substituted off) 66'
N8	8	Ross Moriarty	(substituted off) 65'
OF	7	Josh Navidi
BF	6	Aaron Shingler
RL	5	Alun Wyn Jones (c)
LL	4	Cory Hill	(substituted off) 74'
TP	3	Samson Lee	(substituted off) 58'
HK	2	Ken Owens	(substituted off) 65'
LP	1	Rob Evans	(substituted off) 58'
Replacements:
HK	16	Elliot Dee	(substituted on) 65'
PR	17	Wyn Jones	(substituted on) 58'
PR	18	Tomas Francis	(substituted on) 58'
LK	19	Bradley Davies	(substituted on) 73'
FL	20	Justin Tipuric	(substituted on) 65'
SH	21	Aled Davies	(substituted on) 66'
CE	22	Owen Watkin
WG	23	George North	(substituted on) 56'
Coach:
Warren Gatland

Man of the Match:
Mike Brown (England)

Touch judges:
George Clancy (Ireland)
Nic Berry (Australia)
Television match official:
Glenn Newman (New Zealand)

Notes:

- With this win, England won their 15th consecutive Six Nations home game, breaking their previous record of 14 between 1998 and 2003.
- Leigh Halfpenny was originally named in the starting XV but fell ill the night before the match. Gareth Anscombe replaced him in the starting XV, and centre Owen Watkin came onto the bench.
- This was the lowest aggregate score in a Six Nations match since England beat Ireland 12–6 in 2013.

11 February 2018
15:00 GMT (UTC+0)

Scotland	32–26	France (1 BP)
Try: Maitland 13' c Jones 32' c Con: Laidlaw (2/2) 14', 33'; Pen: Laidlaw (6/6) 44', 49', 61', 65', 71', 77'	Report	Try: Thomas (2) 3' c, 27' c Con: Machenaud (2/2) 4', 28'; Pen: Machenaud (2/2) 10', 40+2'; Serin (2/2) 47', 58'

Murrayfield Stadium, Edinburgh
Attendance: 67,144
Referee: John Lacey (Ireland)

FB	15	Stuart Hogg
RW	14	Tommy Seymour
OC	13	Huw Jones
IC	12	Peter Horne
LW	11	Sean Maitland
FH	10	Finn Russell	(substituted off) 65'
SH	9	Greig Laidlaw
N8	8	Ryan Wilson
OF	7	Hamish Watson
BF	6	John Barclay (c)	(substituted off) 65'
RL	5	Jonny Gray
LL	4	Grant Gilchrist	(substituted off) 58'
TP	3	Simon Berghan
HK	2	Stuart McInally
LP	1	Gordon Reid	(substituted off) 58'
Replacements:
HK	16	Scott Lawson
PR	17	Jamie Bhatti	(substituted on) 58'
PR	18	Jon Welsh
LK	19	Ben Toolis	(substituted on) 58'
N8	20	David Denton	(substituted on) 65'
SH	21	Ali Price	(substituted on) 65'
CE	22	Chris Harris
FB	23	Blair Kinghorn
Coach:
Gregor Townsend

FB	15	Geoffrey Palis
RW	14	Teddy Thomas
OC	13	Rémi Lamerat
IC	12	Geoffrey Doumayrou
LW	11	Virimi Vakatawa	(substituted off) 71'
FH	10	Lionel Beauxis	(substituted off) 71'
SH	9	Maxime Machenaud	(substituted off) 41'
N8	8	Marco Tauleigne	(substituted off) 58'
OF	7	Yacouba Camara
BF	6	Wenceslas Lauret
RL	5	Sébastien Vahaamahina	(substituted off) 71'
LL	4	Arthur Iturria
TP	3	Rabah Slimani	(substituted off) 58'
HK	2	Guilhem Guirado (c)	(substituted off) 75'
LP	1	Jefferson Poirot	(substituted off) 58'
Replacements:
HK	16	Adrien Pélissié	(substituted on) 75'
PR	17	Eddy Ben Arous	(substituted on) 58'
PR	18	Cedate Gomes Sa	(substituted on) 58'
LK	19	Paul Gabrillagues	(substituted on) 71'
N8	20	Louis Picamoles	(substituted on) 58'
SH	21	Baptiste Serin	(substituted on) 41'
FH	22	Anthony Belleau	(substituted on) 71'
WG	23	Benjamin Fall	(substituted on) 71'
Coach:
Jacques Brunel

Man of the Match:
Greig Laidlaw (Scotland)

Touch judges:
Nigel Owens (Wales)
Paul Williams (New Zealand)
Television match official:
Rowan Kitt (England)

Notes:

- Scotland claim the first ever Auld Alliance Trophy.

=== Round 3 ===
23 February 2018
21:00 CET (UTC+1)

France	34–17	Italy
Try: Gabrillagues 4' m Bonneval 59' c Bastareaud 72' c Con: Machenaud (1/2) 60'; Trinh-Duc (1/1) 73'; Pen: Machenaud (5/5) 28', 39', 45', 64', 70'	Report	Try: Penalty try 9'; Minozzi 78' c Con: Canna (1/1) 78'; Pen: Allan (1/1) 49'

Stade Vélodrome, Marseille
Attendance: 50,000
Referee: Wayne Barnes (England)

FB	15	Hugo Bonneval
RW	14	Benjamin Fall
OC	13	Mathieu Bastareaud
IC	12	Geoffrey Doumayrou	(substituted off) 65'
LW	11	Rémy Grosso
FH	10	Lionel Beauxis	(substituted off) 70'
SH	9	Maxime Machenaud	(substituted off) 70'
N8	8	Marco Tauleigne
OF	7	Yacouba Camara	(substituted off) 56'
BF	6	Wenceslas Lauret
RL	5	Sébastien Vahaamahina	(substituted off) 65'
LL	4	Paul Gabrillagues
TP	3	Rabah Slimani	(substituted off) 70'
HK	2	Guilhem Guirado (c)	(substituted off) 38'	(substituted on) 40'	(substituted off) 70'
LP	1	Jefferson Poirot	(substituted off) 60'
Replacements:
HK	16	Adrien Pélissié	(substituted on) 38'	(substituted off) 40'	(substituted on) 70'
PR	17	Dany Priso	(substituted on) 60'
PR	18	Cedate Gomes Sa	(substituted on) 70'
LK	19	Romain Taofifénua	(substituted on) 65'
N8	20	Kélian Galletier	(substituted on) 56'
SH	21	Baptiste Couilloud	(substituted on) 70'
FH	22	François Trinh-Duc	(substituted on) 70'
CE	23	Gaël Fickou	(substituted on) 65'
Coach:
Jacques Brunel

FB	15	Matteo Minozzi
RW	14	Tommaso Benvenuti
OC	13	Tommaso Boni		(substituted off) 62'
IC	12	Tommaso Castello
LW	11	Mattia Bellini
FH	10	Tommaso Allan		(substituted off) 70'
SH	9	Marcello Violi
N8	8	Sergio Parisse (c)
OF	7	Maxime Mbanda
BF	6	Sebastian Negri		(substituted off) 70'
RL	5	Dean Budd		(substituted off) 33'
LL	4	Alessandro Zanni
TP	3	Simone Ferrari		(substituted off) 61'
HK	2	Leonardo Ghiraldini		(substituted off) 67'
LP	1	Andrea Lovotti		(substituted off) 56'
Replacements:
HK	16	Luca Bigi		(substituted on) 67'
PR	17	Nicola Quaglio		(substituted on) 56'
PR	18	Tiziano Pasquali		(substituted on) 61'
LK	19	George Biagi	(yellow card) 80+2'	(substituted on) 33'
LK	20	Federico Ruzza		(substituted on) 70'
SH	21	Edoardo Gori		(substituted on) 48'
FH	22	Carlo Canna		(substituted on) 70'
FB	23	Jayden Hayward		(substituted on) 62'
Coach:
Conor O'Shea

Man of the Match:
Yacouba Camara (France)

Touch judges:
John Lacey (Ireland)
Luke Pearce (England)
Television match official:
David Grashoff (England)

Notes:

- Baptiste Couilloud (France) made his international debut.
- France retain the Giuseppe Garibaldi Trophy.

24 February 2018
14:15 GMT (UTC+0)

(1 BP) Ireland	37–27	Wales
Try: Stockdale (2) 6' m, 80' c Aki 40' c Leavy 44' c Healy 53' m Con: Sexton (2/4) 40', 45'; Carbery (1/1) 80'; Pen: Sexton (1/3) 35'; Murray (1/1) 75'	Report	Try: G. Davies 20' c Shingler 61' c S. Evans 76' c Con: Halfpenny (3/3) 21', 63', 77'; Pen: Halfpenny (2/2) 2', 30'

Aviva Stadium, Dublin
Attendance: 51,700
Referee: Glen Jackson (New Zealand)

FB	15	Rob Kearney
RW	14	Keith Earls	(substituted off) 63'
OC	13	Chris Farrell
IC	12	Bundee Aki
LW	11	Jacob Stockdale
FH	10	Johnny Sexton	(substituted off) 76'
SH	9	Conor Murray
N8	8	CJ Stander
OF	7	Dan Leavy
BF	6	Peter O'Mahony	(substituted off) 66'
RL	5	Devin Toner	(substituted off) 73'
LL	4	James Ryan
TP	3	Andrew Porter	(substituted off) 66'
HK	2	Rory Best (c)	(substituted off) 70'
LP	1	Cian Healy	(substituted off) 63'
Replacements:
HK	16	Seán Cronin	(substituted on) 70'
PR	17	Jack McGrath	(substituted on) 63'
PR	18	John Ryan	(substituted on) 66'
LK	19	Quinn Roux	(substituted on) 73'
N8	20	Jack Conan	(substituted on) 66'
SH	21	Kieran Marmion
FH	22	Joey Carbery	(substituted on) 76'
WG	23	Fergus McFadden	(substituted on) 63'
Coach:
Joe Schmidt

FB	15	Leigh Halfpenny
RW	14	Liam Williams	(substituted off) 63'
OC	13	Scott Williams
IC	12	Hadleigh Parkes
LW	11	Steff Evans
FH	10	Dan Biggar	(substituted off) 63'
SH	9	Gareth Davies
N8	8	Ross Moriarty	(substituted off) 63'
OF	7	Josh Navidi
BF	6	Aaron Shingler
RL	5	Alun Wyn Jones (c)
LL	4	Cory Hill	(substituted off) 63'
TP	3	Samson Lee	(substituted off) 55'
HK	2	Ken Owens	(substituted off) 55'
LP	1	Rob Evans	(substituted off) 55'	(substituted on) 73'
Replacements:
HK	16	Elliot Dee	(substituted on) 55'
PR	17	Wyn Jones	(substituted on) 55'	(substituted off) 73'
PR	18	Tomas Francis	(substituted on) 55'
LK	19	Bradley Davies	(substituted on) 63'
FL	20	Justin Tipuric	(substituted on) 63'
SH	21	Aled Davies
FH	22	Gareth Anscombe	(substituted on) 63'
WG	23	George North	(substituted on) 63'
Coach:
Warren Gatland

Man of the Match:
Chris Farrell (Ireland)

Touch judges:
Pascal Gaüzère (France)
Matthew Carley (England)
Television match official:
Rowan Kitt (England)

Notes:

- This was Warren Gatland's 100th test match in charge of Wales.

24 February 2018
16:45 GMT (UTC+0)

Scotland	25–13	England
Try: Jones (2) 14' c, 37' c Maitland 30' m Con: Laidlaw (2/3) 15', 38'; Pen: Laidlaw (1/1) 2'; Russell (1/1) 66'	Report	Try: Farrell 43' c Con: Farrell (1/1) 43'; Pen: Farrell (2/2) 13', 17'

Murrayfield Stadium, Edinburgh
Attendance: 67,144
Referee: Nigel Owens (Wales)

FB	15	Stuart Hogg
RW	14	Tommy Seymour	(substituted off) 64'
OC	13	Huw Jones
IC	12	Peter Horne	(substituted off) 71'
LW	11	Sean Maitland
FH	10	Finn Russell
SH	9	Greig Laidlaw	(substituted off) 62'
N8	8	Ryan Wilson	(substituted off) 68'
OF	7	Hamish Watson
BF	6	John Barclay (c)
RL	5	Jonny Gray
LL	4	Grant Gilchrist	(substituted off) 55'
TP	3	Simon Berghan	(substituted off) 68'
HK	2	Stuart McInally
LP	1	Gordon Reid	(substituted off) 55'
Replacements:
HK	16	Scott Lawson
PR	17	Jamie Bhatti	(substituted on) 55'
PR	18	WP Nel	(substituted on) 68'
LK	19	Tim Swinson	(substituted on) 55'
N8	20	David Denton	(substituted on) 68'
SH	21	Ali Price	(substituted on) 62'
CE	22	Nick Grigg	(substituted on) 71'
FB	23	Blair Kinghorn	(substituted on) 64'
Coach:
Gregor Townsend

FB	15	Mike Brown		(substituted off) 55'
RW	14	Anthony Watson
OC	13	Jonathan Joseph
IC	12	Owen Farrell
LW	11	Jonny May
FH	10	George Ford		(substituted off) 64'
SH	9	Danny Care		(substituted off) 71'
N8	8	Nathan Hughes		(substituted off) 54'
OF	7	Chris Robshaw
BF	6	Courtney Lawes
RL	5	Maro Itoje
LL	4	Joe Launchbury		(substituted off) 71'
TP	3	Dan Cole		(substituted off) 64'
HK	2	Dylan Hartley (c)		(substituted off) 55'
LP	1	Mako Vunipola		(substituted off) 68'
Replacements:
HK	16	Jamie George		(substituted on) 55'
PR	17	Joe Marler		(substituted on) 68'
PR	18	Harry Williams		(substituted on) 64'
LK	19	George Kruis		(substituted on) 71'
FL	20	Sam Underhill	(yellow card) 65'	(substituted on) 54'
SH	21	Richard Wigglesworth		(substituted on) 71'
CE	22	Ben Te'o		(substituted on) 64'
WG	23	Jack Nowell		(substituted on) 55'
Coach:
Eddie Jones

Man of the Match:
Finn Russell (Scotland)

Touch judges:
Jérôme Garcès (France)
Andrew Brace (Ireland)
Television match official:
Simon McDowell (Ireland)

Notes:

- Blair Kinghorn (Scotland) made his international debut.
- Joe Launchbury (England) earned his 50th test cap.
- This was Scotland's first victory over England since 2008.
- Scotland reclaimed the Calcutta Cup for the first time since 2008.
- Huw Jones' first try was Scotland's first scored against England in Edinburgh since Simon Danielli in 2004.
- Scotland extended their home winning record in the Six Nations to 6 games, their best ever run in the Six Nations.
- This was Scotland's largest victory over England in the Six Nations, and their biggest since they won 33–6 in 1986. That match was also the last time that Scotland had scored three tries against England at Murrayfield.

=== Round 4 ===
10 March 2018
14:15 GMT (UTC+0)

(1 BP) Ireland	28–8	Scotland
Try: Stockdale (2) 22' c, 40+2' c Murray 46' c Cronin 69' c Con: Sexton (4/4) 24', 40+3', 47', 71'	Report	Try: Kinghorn 52' m Pen: Laidlaw (1/1) 13'

Aviva Stadium, Dublin
Attendance: 51,700
Referee: Wayne Barnes (England)

FB	15	Rob Kearney	(substituted off) 75'
RW	14	Keith Earls
OC	13	Garry Ringrose
IC	12	Bundee Aki
LW	11	Jacob Stockdale
FH	10	Johnny Sexton	(substituted off) 73'
SH	9	Conor Murray	(substituted off) 71'
N8	8	CJ Stander
OF	7	Dan Leavy
BF	6	Peter O'Mahony	(substituted off) 55'
RL	5	Devin Toner	(substituted off) 55'
LL	4	James Ryan
TP	3	Tadhg Furlong	(substituted off) 62'
HK	2	Rory Best (c)	(substituted off) 66'
LP	1	Cian Healy	(substituted off) 51'
Replacements:
HK	16	Seán Cronin	(substituted on) 66'
PR	17	Jack McGrath	(substituted on) 51'
PR	18	Andrew Porter	(substituted on) 62'
LK	19	Iain Henderson	(substituted on) 55'
FL	20	Jordi Murphy	(substituted on) 55'
SH	21	Kieran Marmion	(substituted on) 71'
FH	22	Joey Carbery	(substituted on) 73'
WG	23	Jordan Larmour	(substituted on) 75'
Coach:
Joe Schmidt

FB	15	Stuart Hogg
RW	14	Blair Kinghorn	(substituted off) 29'	(substituted on) 37'
OC	13	Huw Jones
IC	12	Peter Horne	(substituted off) 73'
LW	11	Sean Maitland
FH	10	Finn Russell
SH	9	Greig Laidlaw	(substituted off) 67'
N8	8	Ryan Wilson	(substituted off) 18'
OF	7	Hamish Watson
BF	6	John Barclay (c)
RL	5	Jonny Gray	(substituted off) 71'
LL	4	Grant Gilchrist
TP	3	Simon Berghan	(substituted off) 55'
HK	2	Stuart McInally	(substituted off) 60'
LP	1	Gordon Reid	(substituted off) 55'
Replacements:
HK	16	Fraser Brown	(substituted on) 60'
PR	17	Jamie Bhatti	(substituted on) 55'
PR	18	WP Nel	(substituted on) 55'
LK	19	Tim Swinson	(substituted on) 71'
N8	20	David Denton	(substituted on) 18'
SH	21	Ali Price	(substituted on) 67'
CE	22	Nick Grigg	(substituted on) 73'
WG	23	Lee Jones	(substituted on) 29'	(substituted off) 37'
Coach:
Gregor Townsend

Man of the Match:
Rob Kearney (Ireland)

Touch judges:
Ben O'Keeffe (New Zealand)
Luke Pearce (England)
Television match official:
George Ayoub (Australia)

Notes:

- Ireland reclaim the Centenary Quaich.

10 March 2018
17:45 CET (UTC+1)

France	22–16	England (1 BP)
Try: Penalty try 49'; Pen: Machenaud (4/4) 25', 33', 37', 63'; Beauxis (1/1) 78'	Report	Try: May 74' c Con: Farrell (1/1) 75'; Pen: Farrell (2/2) 4', 29'; Daly (1/1) 21'

Stade de France, Saint-Denis
Attendance: 78,060
Referee: Jaco Peyper (South Africa)

FB	15	Hugo Bonneval	(substituted off) 15'	(substituted on) 24'	(substituted off) 41'
RW	14	Benjamin Fall
OC	13	Mathieu Bastareaud
IC	12	Geoffrey Doumayrou
LW	11	Rémy Grosso
FH	10	François Trinh-Duc	(substituted off) 71'
SH	9	Maxime Machenaud	(substituted off) 71'
N8	8	Marco Tauleigne
OF	7	Yacouba Camara
BF	6	Wenceslas Lauret	(substituted off) 66'
RL	5	Sébastien Vahaamahina	(substituted off) 66'
LL	4	Paul Gabrillagues
TP	3	Rabah Slimani	(substituted off) 59'
HK	2	Guilhem Guirado (c)	(substituted off) 66'
LP	1	Jefferson Poirot	(substituted off) 66'
Replacements:
HK	16	Adrien Pélissié	(substituted on) 66'
PR	17	Dany Priso	(substituted on) 66'
PR	18	Cedate Gomes Sa	(substituted on) 59'
FL	19	Bernard Le Roux	(substituted on) 66'
N8	20	Kélian Galletier	(substituted on) 66'
SH	21	Baptiste Couilloud	(substituted on) 71'
FH	22	Lionel Beauxis	(substituted on) 71'
CE	23	Gaël Fickou	(substituted on) 15'	(substituted off) 24'	(substituted on) 41'
Coach:
Jacques Brunel

FB	15	Anthony Watson	(yellow card) 49'	(substituted off) 68'
RW	14	Jonny May
OC	13	Ben Te'o
IC	12	Owen Farrell (c)
LW	11	Elliot Daly
FH	10	George Ford		(substituted off) 60'
SH	9	Danny Care		(substituted off) 68'
N8	8	Nathan Hughes		(substituted off) 24'
OF	7	Chris Robshaw
BF	6	Courtney Lawes
RL	5	Maro Itoje
LL	4	Joe Launchbury		(substituted off) 52'
TP	3	Dan Cole		(substituted off) 58'
HK	2	Jamie George		(substituted off) 64'
LP	1	Mako Vunipola		(substituted off) 64'
Replacements:
HK	16	Luke Cowan-Dickie		(substituted on) 64'
PR	17	Joe Marler		(substituted on) 64'
PR	18	Kyle Sinckler		(substituted on) 58'
FL	19	James Haskell		(substituted on) 52'
N8	20	Sam Simmonds		(substituted on) 24'
SH	21	Richard Wigglesworth		(substituted on) 68'
CE	22	Jonathan Joseph		(substituted on) 60'
FB	23	Mike Brown		(substituted on) 68'
Coach:
Eddie Jones

Man of the Match:
Rémy Grosso (France)

Touch judges:
Angus Gardner (Australia)
Marius van der Westhuizen (South Africa)
Television match official:
Ben Skeen (New Zealand)

Notes:

- With this English loss, Ireland claimed the Championship with the final round yet to be played.
- This was the first time since 2015 that England lost two consecutive games; 2015 was also the last time France beat England.
- This was the first time since 2010 England lost multiple games in a single Six Nations tournament.
- With Dylan Hartley's injury, Owen Farrell captained England for the first time.

11 March 2018
15:00 GMT (UTC+0)

(1 BP) Wales	38–14	Italy
Try: Parkes 3' c North (2) 5' c, 65' c Hill 42' c Tipuric 70' c Con: Anscombe (3/3) 4', 7', 43'; Halfpenny (2/2) 67', 71'; Pen: Anscombe (1/1) 36'	Report	Try: Minozzi 9' c Bellini 75' c Con: Allan (1/1) 11'; Canna (1/1) 76'

Millennium Stadium, Cardiff
Attendance: 65,242
Referee: Jérôme Garcès (France)

FB	15	Liam Williams	(yellow card) 40+3'	(substituted off) 50'
RW	14	George North
OC	13	Owen Watkin
IC	12	Hadleigh Parkes
LW	11	Steff Evans
FH	10	Gareth Anscombe		(substituted off) 60'
SH	9	Gareth Davies	(yellow card) 48'	(substituted off) 60'
N8	8	Taulupe Faletau (c)
OF	7	James Davies		(substituted off) 65'
BF	6	Justin Tipuric
RL	5	Bradley Davies
LL	4	Cory Hill		(substituted off) 65'
TP	3	Tomas Francis		(substituted off) 67'
HK	2	Elliot Dee		(substituted off) 60'
LP	1	Nicky Smith		(substituted off) 60'
Replacements:
HK	16	Ken Owens		(substituted on) 60'
PR	17	Rob Evans		(substituted on) 60'
PR	18	Rhodri Jones		(substituted on) 67'
LK	19	Seb Davies		(substituted on) 65'
FL	20	Ellis Jenkins		(substituted on) 65'
SH	21	Aled Davies		(substituted on) 60'
FH	22	Rhys Patchell		(substituted on) 60'
FB	23	Leigh Halfpenny		(substituted on) 50'
Coach:
Warren Gatland

FB	15	Matteo Minozzi
RW	14	Tommaso Benvenuti	(yellow card) 77'
OC	13	Giulio Bisegni
IC	12	Tommaso Castello		(substituted off) 4'
LW	11	Mattia Bellini
FH	10	Tommaso Allan		(substituted off) 68'
SH	9	Marcello Violi		(substituted off) 63'
N8	8	Sergio Parisse (c)
OF	7	Maxime Mbanda		(substituted off) 14'
BF	6	Sebastian Negri		(substituted off) 67'
RL	5	Dean Budd
LL	4	Alessandro Zanni
TP	3	Simone Ferrari		(substituted off) 63'
HK	2	Leonardo Ghiraldini		(substituted off) 68'
LP	1	Andrea Lovotti		(substituted off) 60'
Replacements:
HK	16	Oliviero Fabiani		(substituted on) 68'
PR	17	Nicola Quaglio		(substituted on) 60'
PR	18	Tiziano Pasquali		(substituted on) 63'
LK	19	Federico Ruzza		(substituted on) 67'
FL	20	Giovanni Licata		(substituted on) 14'
SH	21	Guglielmo Palazzani		(substituted on) 63'
FH	22	Carlo Canna		(substituted on) 68'
FB	23	Jayden Hayward		(substituted on) 4'
Coach:
Conor O'Shea

Man of the Match:
Hadleigh Parkes (Wales)

Touch judges:
Pascal Gaüzère (France)
Andrew Brace (Ireland)
Television match official:
Marius Jonker (South Africa)

Notes:

- James Davies (Wales) made his international debut.
- Samson Lee was named on the bench, but withdrew from the squad due to illness on match-day. He was replaced with Rhodri Jones.
- Wales's win guaranteed Italy would win the "wooden spoon" for coming last.

=== Round 5 ===
17 March 2018
13:30 CET (UTC+1)

(1 BP) Italy	27–29	Scotland (1 BP)
Try: Allan (2) 14' c, 45' c Minozzi 21' c Con: Allan (3/3) 15', 22', 46'; Pen: Allan (2/2) 7', 76'	Report	Try: Brown 10' m Barclay 25' c Maitland 61' c Hogg 71' c Con: Laidlaw (3/4) 26', 62', 72'; Pen: Laidlaw (1/1) 79'

Stadio Olimpico, Rome
Attendance: 60,412
Referee: Pascal Gaüzère (France)

FB	15	Matteo Minozzi
RW	14	Tommaso Benvenuti	(substituted off) 59'
OC	13	Giulio Bisegni
IC	12	Tommaso Castello	(substituted off) 74'
LW	11	Mattia Bellini
FH	10	Tommaso Allan
SH	9	Marcello Violi	(substituted off) 67'
N8	8	Sergio Parisse (c)
OF	7	Jake Polledri	(substituted off) 67'
BF	6	Sebastian Negri
RL	5	Dean Budd
LL	4	Alessandro Zanni	(substituted off) 53'
TP	3	Simone Ferrari	(substituted off) 60'
HK	2	Leonardo Ghiraldini	(substituted off) 77'
LP	1	Andrea Lovotti	(substituted off) 59'
Replacements:
HK	16	Oliviero Fabiani	(substituted on) 77'
PR	17	Nicola Quaglio	(substituted on) 59'
PR	18	Tiziano Pasquali	(substituted on) 60'
N8	19	Braam Steyn	(substituted on) 53'
FL	20	Giovanni Licata	(substituted on) 67'
SH	21	Guglielmo Palazzani	(substituted on) 67'
FH	22	Carlo Canna	(substituted on) 74'
FB	23	Jayden Hayward	(substituted on) 59'
Coach:
Conor O'Shea

FB	15	Stuart Hogg
RW	14	Tommy Seymour
OC	13	Huw Jones	(substituted off) 53'
IC	12	Nick Grigg
LW	11	Sean Maitland
FH	10	Finn Russell	(substituted off) 54'
SH	9	Greig Laidlaw
N8	8	Ryan Wilson	(substituted off) 67'
OF	7	Hamish Watson
BF	6	John Barclay (c)
RL	5	Jonny Gray
LL	4	Tim Swinson	(substituted off) 53'
TP	3	WP Nel	(substituted off) 40'
HK	2	Fraser Brown	(substituted off) 40'
LP	1	Gordon Reid	(substituted off) 40'
Replacements:
HK	16	Stuart McInally	(substituted on) 40'
PR	17	Jamie Bhatti	(substituted on) 40'
PR	18	Zander Fagerson	(substituted on) 40'
LK	19	Richie Gray	(substituted on) 53'
N8	20	David Denton	(substituted on) 67'
SH	21	Ali Price	(substituted on) 54'
FH	22	Peter Horne	(substituted on) 53'
FB	23	Blair Kinghorn
Coach:
Gregor Townsend

Man of the Match:
Tommaso Allan (Italy)

Touch judges:
Jérôme Garcès (France)
Andrew Brace (Ireland)
Television match official:
Marius Jonker (South Africa)

Notes:

- Jake Polledri (Italy) made his international debut.
- Tommaso Benvenuti (Italy) earned his 50th test cap.
- The losing bonus point obtained by Italy was their first point under the new points structure introduced in 2017.
- This loss was Sergio Parisse's 100th test loss, the first time the figure has been reached.

17 March 2018
14:45 GMT (UTC+0)

England	15–24	Ireland (3 BP)
Try: Daly (2) 32' m, 65' m May 80+2' m	Report	Try: Ringrose 6' c Stander 24' c Stockdale 40+2' c Con: Sexton (2/2) 7', 24'; Carbery (1/1) 40+5'; Pen: Murray (1/1) 60'

Twickenham Stadium, London
Attendance: 82,062
Referee: Angus Gardner (Australia)

FB	15	Anthony Watson	(substituted off) 34'
RW	14	Jonny May
OC	13	Jonathan Joseph	(substituted off) 56'
IC	12	Ben Te'o
LW	11	Elliot Daly
FH	10	Owen Farrell
SH	9	Richard Wigglesworth	(substituted off) 61'
N8	8	Sam Simmonds	(substituted off) 67'
OF	7	James Haskell
BF	6	Chris Robshaw
RL	5	George Kruis	(substituted off) 71'
LL	4	Maro Itoje
TP	3	Kyle Sinckler	(substituted off) 53'
HK	2	Dylan Hartley (c)	(substituted off) 58'
LP	1	Mako Vunipola	(substituted off) 53'
Replacements:
HK	16	Jamie George	(substituted on) 58'
PR	17	Joe Marler	(substituted on) 53'
PR	18	Dan Cole	(substituted on) 53'
LK	19	Joe Launchbury	(substituted on) 71'
FL	20	Don Armand	(substituted on) 67'
SH	21	Danny Care	(substituted on) 61'
FH	22	George Ford	(substituted on) 56'
FB	23	Mike Brown	(substituted on) 34'
Coach:
Eddie Jones

FB	15	Rob Kearney
RW	14	Keith Earls		(substituted off) 74'
OC	13	Garry Ringrose
IC	12	Bundee Aki		(substituted off) 56'
LW	11	Jacob Stockdale
FH	10	Johnny Sexton		(substituted off) 34'	(substituted on) 41'	(substituted off) 67'
SH	9	Conor Murray
N8	8	CJ Stander
OF	7	Dan Leavy
BF	6	Peter O'Mahony	(yellow card) 29'	(substituted off) 74'
RL	5	Iain Henderson
LL	4	James Ryan		(substituted off) 67'
TP	3	Tadhg Furlong		(substituted off) 65'
HK	2	Rory Best (c)		(substituted off) 65'
LP	1	Cian Healy		(substituted off) 51'
Replacements:
HK	16	Seán Cronin		(substituted on) 65'
PR	17	Jack McGrath		(substituted on) 51'
PR	18	Andrew Porter		(substituted on) 65'
LK	19	Devin Toner		(substituted on) 67'
FL	20	Jordi Murphy		(substituted on) 74'
SH	21	Kieran Marmion		(substituted on) 74'
FH	22	Joey Carbery		(substituted on) 34'	(substituted off) 41'	(substituted on) 67'
WG	23	Jordan Larmour		(substituted on) 56'
Coach:
Joe Schmidt

Man of the Match:
Tadhg Furlong (Ireland)

Touch judges:
Jaco Peyper (South Africa)
Nigel Owens (Wales)
Television match official:
Ben Skeen (New Zealand)

Notes:

- Marius van der Westhuizen was originally named as a touch judge, but was replaced with Nigel Owens by World Rugby, after attending an England training session in midweek.
- England's defeat was their first loss at Twickenham in the Six Nations since 2012 (a run of 15 matches), their first loss at home overall since 2015 (a run of 14 games), and Ireland's first win against England at Twickenham since 2010.
- Ireland retained the Millennium Trophy for the first time since their three consecutive victories over England between 2009 and 2011.
- Ireland won their third Grand Slam and their eleventh Triple Crown; the first time they had won either since 2009.
- With this win, Ireland became the first team to earn the three-point bonus for completing a Grand Slam.

17 March 2018
17:00 GMT (UTC+0)

Wales	14–13	France (1 BP)
Try: L. Williams 4' m Pen: Halfpenny (3/3) 10', 16', 32'	Report	Try: Fickou 21' c Con: Machenaud (1/1) 22'; Pen: Machenaud (1/2) 49'; Drop: Trinh-Duc (1/1) 4'

Millennium Stadium, Cardiff
Attendance: 74,169
Referee: Ben O'Keeffe (New Zealand)

FB	15	Leigh Halfpenny
RW	14	George North
OC	13	Scott Williams
IC	12	Hadleigh Parkes
LW	11	Liam Williams
FH	10	Dan Biggar
SH	9	Gareth Davies
N8	8	Taulupe Faletau
OF	7	Josh Navidi
BF	6	Justin Tipuric	(substituted off) 56'
RL	5	Alun Wyn Jones (c)
LL	4	Cory Hill	(substituted off) 69'
TP	3	Tomas Francis	(substituted off) 64'
HK	2	Ken Owens	(substituted off) 69'
LP	1	Rob Evans	(substituted off) 64'
Replacements:
HK	16	Elliot Dee	(substituted on) 69'
PR	17	Nicky Smith	(substituted on) 64'
PR	18	Samson Lee	(substituted on) 64'
LK	19	Bradley Davies	(substituted on) 69'
FL	20	Aaron Shingler	(substituted on) 56'
SH	21	Aled Davies
FH	22	Gareth Anscombe
WG	23	Steff Evans
Coach:
Warren Gatland

FB	15	Benjamin Fall
RW	14	Gaël Fickou
OC	13	Mathieu Bastareaud (c)
IC	12	Geoffrey Doumayrou
LW	11	Rémy Grosso
FH	10	François Trinh-Duc	(substituted off) 71'
SH	9	Maxime Machenaud	(substituted off) 62'
N8	8	Marco Tauleigne
OF	7	Yacouba Camara	(substituted off) 26'
BF	6	Wenceslas Lauret		(substituted off) 77'
RL	5	Sébastien Vahaamahina
LL	4	Paul Gabrillagues	(substituted off) 71'	(substituted on) 77'
TP	3	Cedate Gomes Sa	(substituted off) 51'
HK	2	Adrien Pélissié	(substituted off) 51'
LP	1	Jefferson Poirot	(substituted off) 60'
Replacements:
HK	16	Camille Chat	(substituted on) 51'
PR	17	Dany Priso	(substituted on) 60'
PR	18	Rabah Slimani	(substituted on) 51'
FL	19	Bernard Le Roux	(substituted on) 71'
FL	20	Mathieu Babillot	(substituted on) 26'
SH	21	Baptiste Couilloud	(substituted on) 62'
FH	22	Lionel Beauxis	(substituted on) 71'
FB	23	Geoffrey Palis
Coach:
Jacques Brunel

Man of the Match:
Alun Wyn Jones (Wales)

Touch judges:
Wayne Barnes (England)
Luke Pearce (England)
Television match official:
George Ayoub (Australia)

Notes:

- Mathieu Babillot (France) made his international debut.
- The losing bonus point secured by France ensured that England finished 5th outright for the first time since 1983.

== Statistics ==
=== Top points scorers ===
Pos	Name	Team	Pts
1	Maxime Machenaud	France	50
2	Leigh Halfpenny	Wales	49
3	Johnny Sexton	Ireland	44
4	Tommaso Allan	Italy	41
4	Greig Laidlaw	Scotland	41
6	Owen Farrell	England	39
7	Jacob Stockdale	Ireland	35
8	Jonny May	England	20
8	Matteo Minozzi	Italy	20
10	Conor Murray	Ireland	16

=== Top try scorers ===
Pos	Name	Team	Tries
1	Jacob Stockdale	Ireland	7
2	Jonny May	England	4
2	Matteo Minozzi	Italy	4
4	Tommaso Allan	Italy	3
4	Huw Jones	Scotland	3
4	Sean Maitland	Scotland	3
4	Teddy Thomas	France	3
8	Bundee Aki	Ireland	2
8	Mattia Bellini	Italy	2
8	Elliot Daly	England	2
8	Gareth Davies	Wales	2
8	Steff Evans	Wales	2
8	Owen Farrell	England	2
8	Leigh Halfpenny	Wales	2
8	Robbie Henshaw	Ireland	2
8	Conor Murray	Ireland	2
8	George North	Wales	2
8	Sam Simmonds	England	2
8	Anthony Watson	England	2
