= Cedate Gomes Sa =

French rugby union player (born 1993)

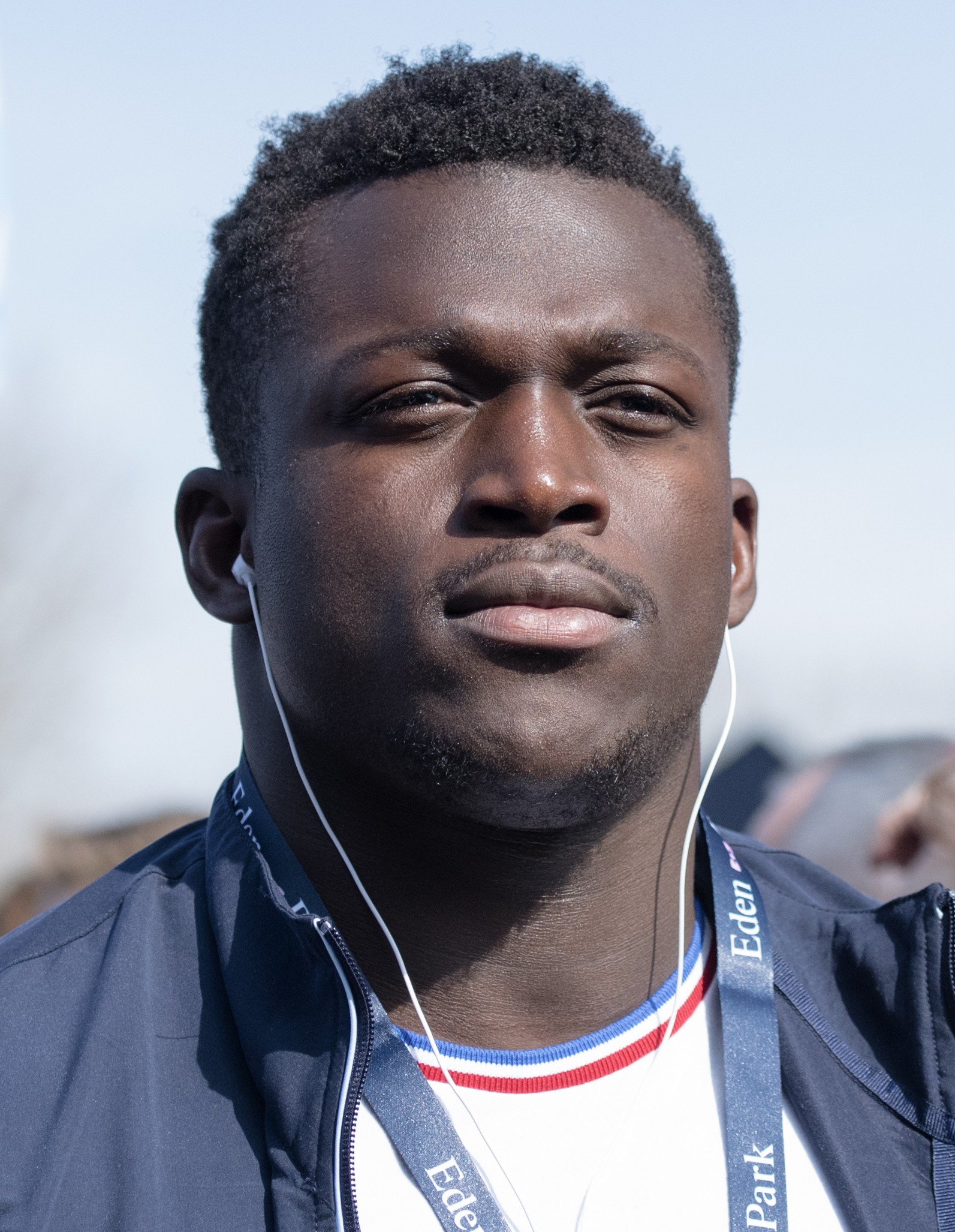
- Born: Cedate Gomes Sa; 7 August 1993 (age 33) Canchungo, Guinea-Bissau
- Height: 1.85 m (6 ft 1 in)
- Weight: 123 kg (19 st 5 lb)

Rugby union career
- Position: Prop
- Current team: Racing 92
Senior career
Years	Team	Apps	(Points)
2015–2024	Racing 92	177	(30)
2024−	Lyon	18	(0)
- Correct as of 8 September 2022
International career
Years	Team	Apps	(Points)
2018–	France	9	(5)
- Correct as of 17 November 2018

Cedate Gomes Sa (born 7 August 1993) is a French-Portuguese rugby union player. His position is prop and he currently plays for Lyon in the Top 14.

== International career ==
Gomes Sa was called up to the French national team for the first time ahead of France's opening 2018 Six Nations Championship match against Ireland. He made his debut in that game coming on for Rabah Slimani in the 55th minute of an eventual 13–15 home loss.

== International tries ==
#	Date	Venue	Cap	Opponent	Result (France-...)	Competition
1.	16 June 2018	Westpac Stadium, Wellington, New Zealand	6	New Zealand	13–26	Test Match
