= Dan Leavy =

Irish rugby player (born 1994)

- Born: Daniel John Leavy; 23 May 1994 (age 32) Dublin, Ireland
- Height: 1.91 m (6 ft 3 in)
- Weight: 106 kg (16.7 st; 234 lb)
- School: St Michael's College
- University: University College Dublin Degree in Business & Law (BBL) 2017
- Notable relative: Adam Leavy (brother)

Rugby union career
- Position: Flanker
Amateur team(s)
Years	Team	Apps	(Points)
2012–	UCD		
Senior career
Years	Team	Apps	(Points)
2014–2022	Leinster	79	(85)
- Correct as of 5 April 2022
International career
Years	Team	Apps	(Points)
2013–2014	Ireland U20	7	(10)
2016–2018	Ireland	11	(15)
- Correct as of 16 November 2021

Dan Leavy (born 23 May 1994) is an Irish rugby union former player who played for Leinster Rugby. His preferred position was flanker.

== Playing career ==
Leavy was enrolled in the Leinster Rugby academy. He debuted with the Leinster senior team in October 2014 against Edinburgh. It was announced in April 2015 that he had been awarded a senior contract with Leinster following completion of his time in the academy.

Leavy received his first call-up to the senior Ireland team in November 2016, and made his debut on November 12 as a substitute against Canada.

On 18 March 2017, he was called to the Irish bench for the 2017 Six Nations against England after Jamie Heaslip turned his ankle during the warmup. He received his first start in June 2017 against Japan. Leavy played in all five of Ireland's matches in the 2018 Six Nations, coming on as a substitute in the first match against France, and starting in the remaining four matches, helping the team win the Grand Slam. Leavy was also part of the successful Ireland squad that won the 2018 series against Australia in June. In March 2019, Leavy suffered a serious knee injury against Ulster, leading to prolonged absence and three years of multiple operations.

== Retirement ==
On the 5 April 2022, following advice from a doctor Leavy retired due to injury, aged 27. Leavy moved to London in 2024 and is now an investor relations specialist for a financial firm.

== Honours ==
=== Ireland ===
- Six Nations Championship:
  - Winner (1): 2018
- Grand Slam:
  - Winner (1): 2018
- Triple Crown:
  - Winner (1):2018

=== Leinster ===
- Pro 14:
  - Winner (2):2017/18, 2018/19
- European Champions Cup:
  - Winner (1):2018
