= Cory Hill =

Wales international rugby union player

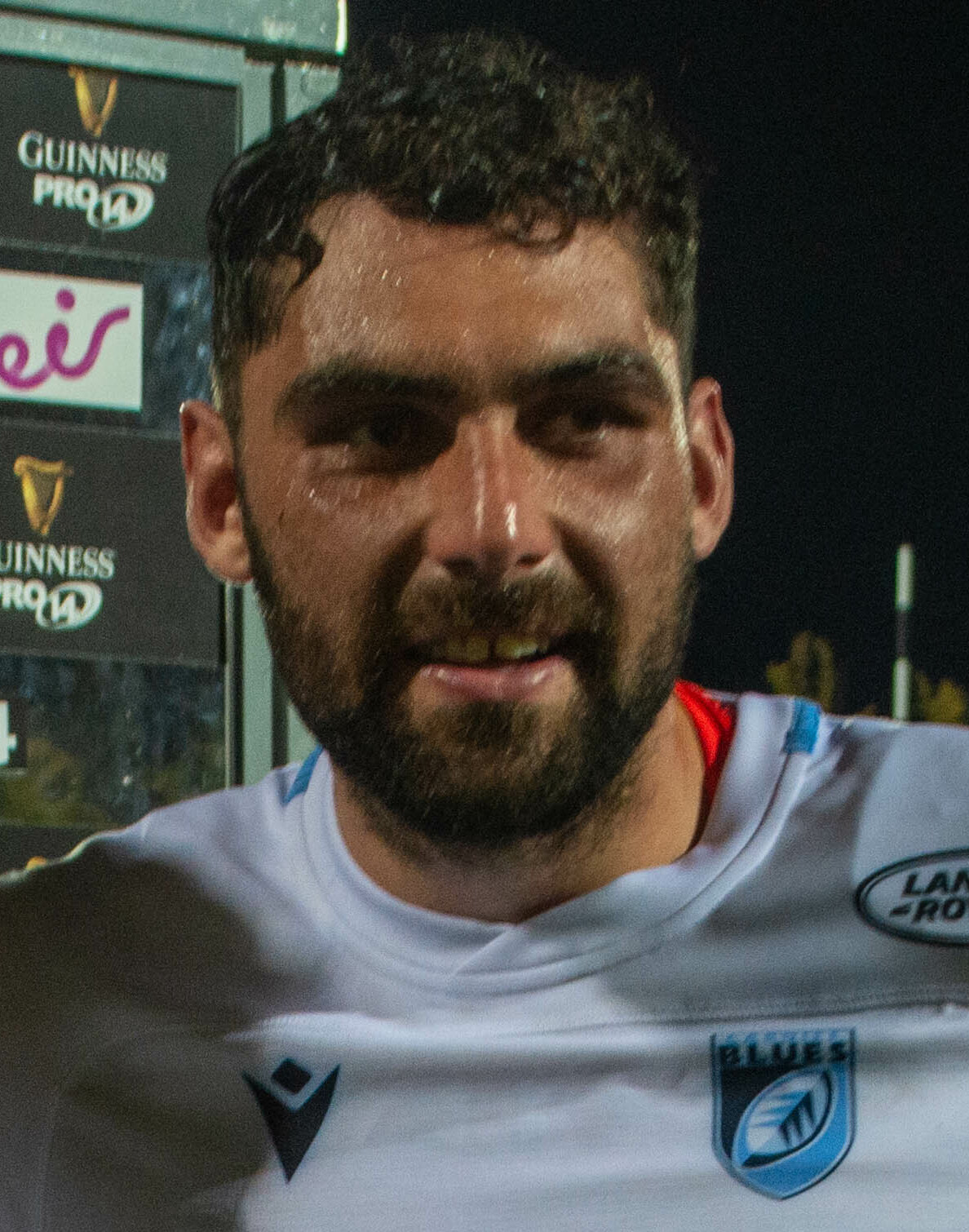
- Born: Cory Hill; 10 February 1992 (age 34) Maesycoed, Wales
- Height: 193 cm (6 ft 4 in)
- Weight: 111 kg (17 st 7 lb; 245 lb)

Rugby union career
- Position(s): Lock, Blindside Flanker
Senior career
Years	Team	Apps	(Points)
2010–2013	Cardiff Blues	16	(0)
2013	Moseley	7	(5)
2013–2020	Dragons	110	(65)
2020–2021	Cardiff Blues	9	(0)
2021–2023	Yokohama Canon Eagles	22	(25)
2023–2025	Secom Rugguts	19	(15)
- Correct as of 6 December 2025
International career
Years	Team	Apps	(Points)
2012	Wales U20	1	(0)
2016–2024	Wales	32	(20)
- Correct as of 6 December 2025

Cory Hill (born 10 February 1992) is a Wales international rugby union player. His usual playing positions are blindside flanker and lock forward.

A lock forward who can also play at blindside flanker, Hill began his career with Pontypridd RFC and the Cardiff Blues. In June 2013 he signed for Moseley and in November 2013 joined the Dragons. Hill rejoined Cardiff Blues for the 2020–21 season.

Hill became ineligible to play for Wales when he moved to Japan to join Yokohama Canon Eagles in 2021 as he was short of the 60-cap requirement for players based overseas. In 2023 he then signed for fourth division Secom Rugguts.

== International ==
In April 2012 Hill was selected as captain of the Wales Under-20 squad for the Junior World Cup in South Africa.

Hill made his senior debut for Wales on 5 November 2016 versus Australia as a second-half replacement. He played in four of Wales' five games in the 2018 Six Nations, and captained his country against Argentina on the summer tour later that year.

On 16 June 2017, Hill was a mid-tour call up for the British & Irish Lions in 2017, provoking some controversy among the rugby press.

Hill was named in the 2019 Rugby World Cup squad for Wales.

Hill returned to international rugby in the summer of 2024, and was selected by Warren Gatland to captain the squad against the Queensland Reds. However, it was announced he would not play due to personal reasons. Gatland later apologised for his decision naming Hill as captain.

=== International tries ===
Try	Opponent	Location	Venue	Competition	Date	Result
1	Italy	Cardiff, Wales	Millennium Stadium	2018 Six Nations	11 March 2018	Win
2	Tonga	Cardiff, Wales	Millennium Stadium	2018 Autumn Internationals	17 November 2018	Win
3	England	Cardiff, Wales	Principality Stadium	2019 Six Nations	23 February 2019	Win
4	England	Cardiff, Wales	Principality Stadium	2021 Six Nations	27 February 2021	Win

== Controversy ==
In October 2021 it was revealed that Hill was one of three men who attacked a house in Rhondda Cynon Taf in May 2021. It was reported that Hill, under the influence of alcohol, believed that the house was one of the rental properties he owned and that the tenant owed rent. This was incorrect and Hill attacked the home of a woman and her small children. Shortly after the incident, Hill left Cardiff Blues to play rugby for Yokohama Canon Eagles in Japan, bringing his Wales career to an end.
