= Paul Gabrillagues =

French rugby union player (born 1993)

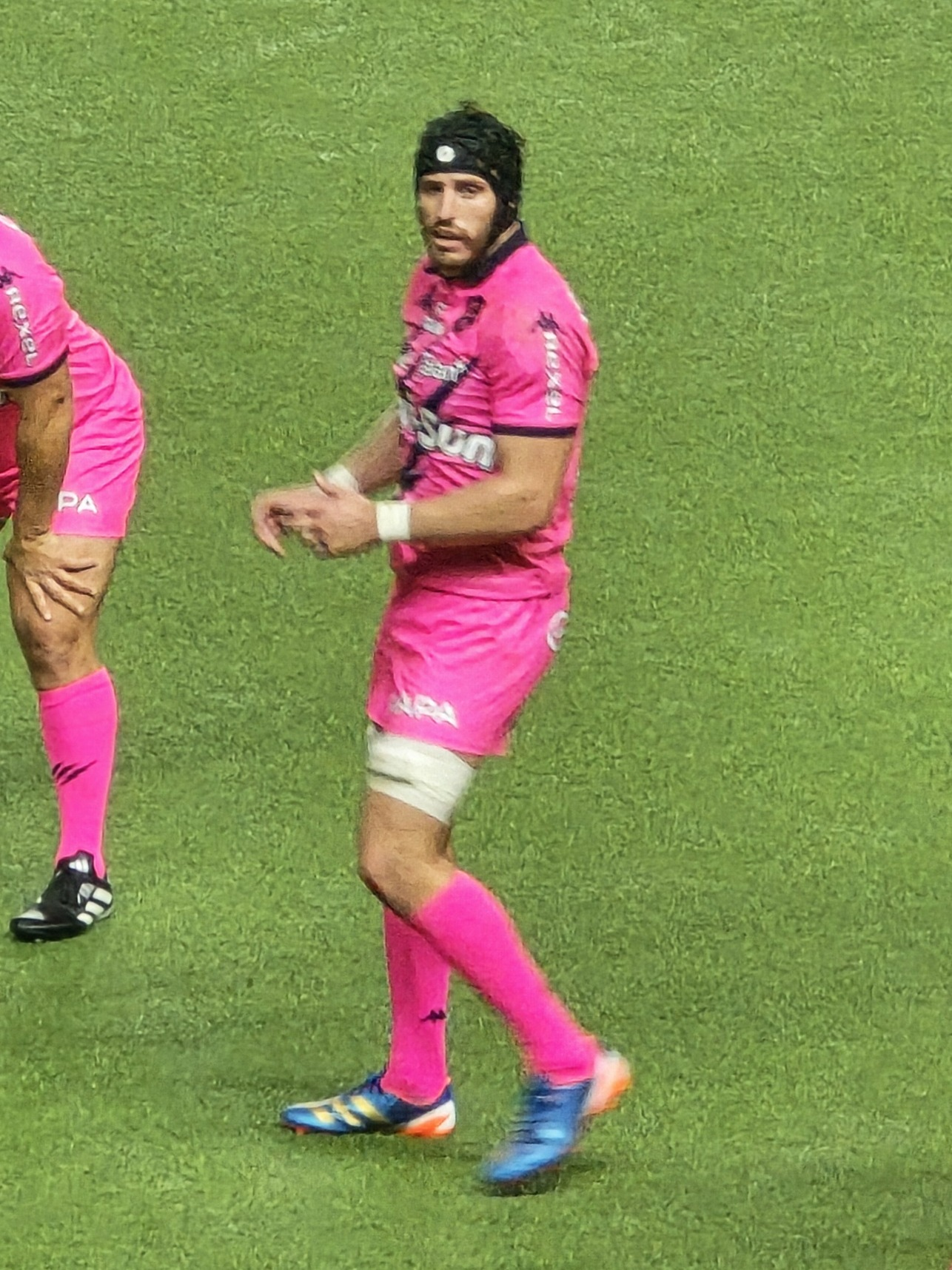
- Born: Paul Gabrillagues; 3 June 1993 (age 33) Paris, France
- Height: 2.00 m (6 ft 6 1/2 in)
- Weight: 115 kg (18 st 2 lb)

Rugby union career
- Position: Lock
- Current team: Stade Français
Senior career
Years	Team	Apps	(Points)
2014–	Stade Français	216	(30)
- Correct as of 17 January 2024
International career
Years	Team	Apps	(Points)
2017–	France	18	(10)
- Correct as of 10 February 2024

Paul Gabrillagues (born 3 June 1993) is a French rugby union player. His position is lock and he currently plays for Stade Français in the Top 14.

== Career statistics ==
=== List of international tries ===
International tries
No.	Date	Venue	Opponent	Score	Result	Competition
1	23 February 2018	Stade Vélodrome, Marseille, France	Italy	5–0	34–17	2018 Six Nations
2	2 February 2024	Stade Velodrome, Marseille, France	Ireland	15–24	17–38	2024 Six Nations
