= Gaël Fickou =

France international rugby union player

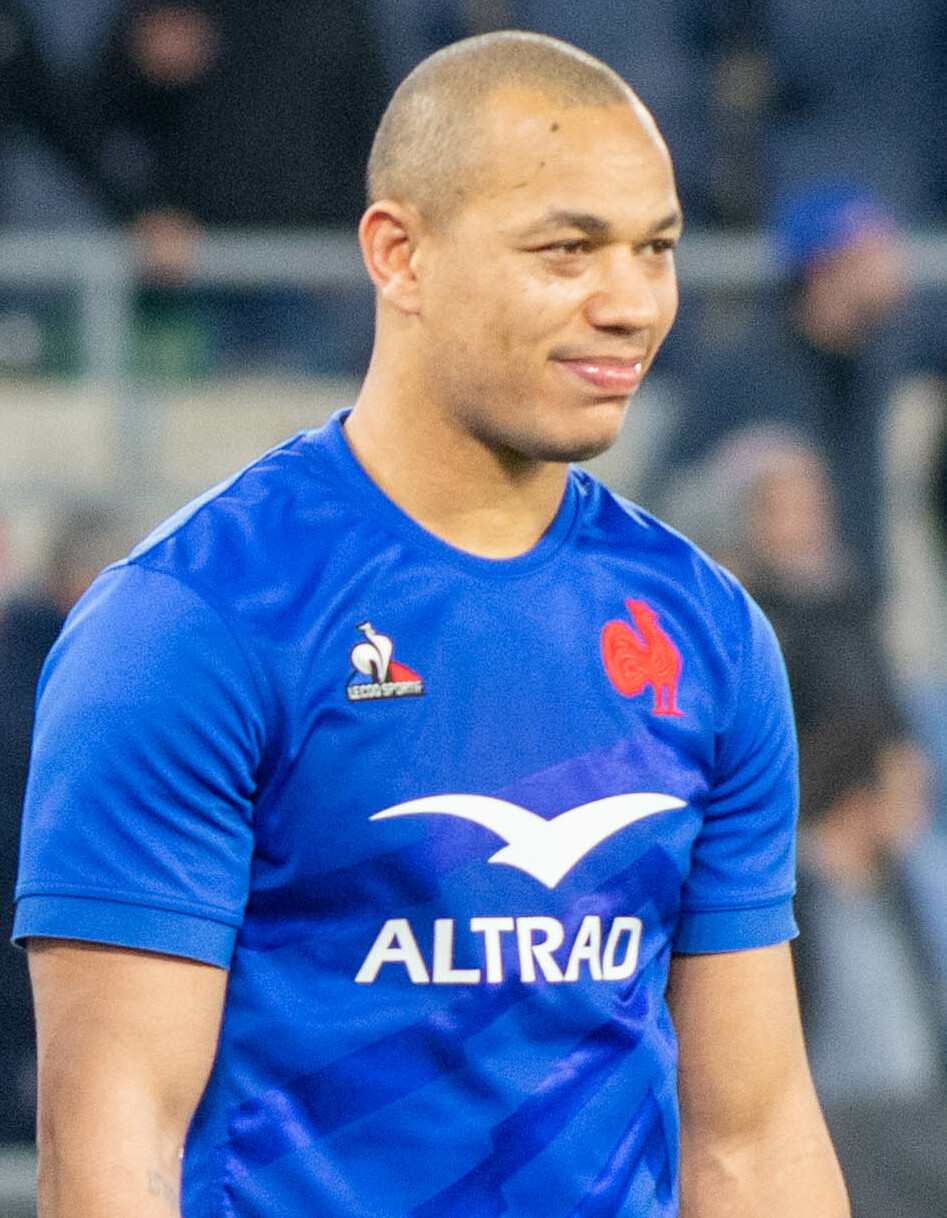
- Fickou representing France during the Six Nations Championship
- Born: 26 March 1994 (age 32) La Seyne-sur-Mer, France
- Height: 1.91 m (6 ft 3 in)
- Weight: 100 kg (220 lb; 15 st 10 lb)

Rugby union career
- Position(s): Centre, Wing
- Current team: Toulon
Senior career
Years	Team	Apps	(Points)
2012–2018	Toulouse	135	(198)
2018–2021	Stade Français	32	(65)
2021–2026	Racing 92	108	(147)
2026–	Toulon	1	(0)
- Correct as of 7 September 2026
International career
Years	Team	Apps	(Points)
2013	France U20	6	(15)
2013–	France	98	(85)
- Correct as of 22 November 2025

Gaël Fickou (born 26 March 1994) is a French professional rugby union player who plays as a centre for Top 14 club Toulon and the France national team.

== Club career ==
Fickou made his Heineken Cup debut on 14 October 2012, scoring the only try of the game in a win against Leicester Tigers. His lithe movement, balance and pace for his size has seen him compared to English rugby legend Jeremy Guscott.

According to Toulouse and France teammate, Maxime Médard, Fickou "is one of the 10 best centres in the world and soon he will be number one. He reminds me of Sonny Bill Williams: tall, athletic, technical, with a good hand-off and a feel for the game. He has everything."

After spending six seasons with Toulouse, he signed with Stade Français for the start of the 2018–19 season.

On 22 March 2021, Fickou would leave Stade Français to join with Top 14 rivals Racing 92 ahead of the 2021–22 season.

== International career ==
He made his French international debut at the age of 18 against Scotland on 16 March 2013 in the RBS 6 Nations.

Fickou scored his first try for France against England during the 2014 Six Nations.

== Career statistics ==
=== List of international tries ===
International tries
No.	Date	Venue	Opponent	Score	Result	Competition
1	1 February 2014	Stade de France, Saint-Denis, France	England	24–24	26–24	2014 Six Nations
2	23 September 2015	Olympic Stadium, London, England	Romania	36–11	38–11	2015 Rugby World Cup
3	13 March 2016	Murrayfield Stadium, Edinburgh, Scotland	Scotland	18–10	29–18	2016 Six Nations
4	12 November 2016	Stadium de Toulouse, Toulouse, France	Samoa	43–8	52–8	2016 November test series
5	12 February 2017	Stade de France, Saint-Denis, France	Scotland	11–5	22–16	2017 Six Nations
6	20 March 2017	Stadio Olimpico, Rome, Italy	Italy	8–11	18–40	2017 Six Nations
7	17 March 2018	Millennium Stadium, Cardiff, Wales	Wales	11–8	14–13	2018 Six Nations
8	21 September 2019	Tokyo Stadium, Chōfu, Japan	Argentina	5–3	23–21	2019 Rugby World Cup
9	2 October 2019	Fukuoka Hakatanomori Stadium, Fukuoka, Japan	United States	17–9	33–9	2019 Rugby World Cup
10	6 February 2021	Stadio Olimpico, Rome, Italy	Italy	3–15	10–50	2021 Six Nations
11	26 February 2022	Murrayfield Stadium, Edinburgh, Scotland	Scotland	10–17	17–36	2022 Six Nations
12	19 March 2022	Stade de France, Saint-Denis, France	England	8–0	25–13	2022 Six Nations
13	26 February 2023	Stade de France, Saint-Denis, France	Scotland	30–21	32–21	2023 Six Nations
14	18 March 2023	Stade de France, Saint-Denis, France	Wales	32–7	41–28	2023 Six Nations
15	10 February 2024	Murrayfield Stadium, Edinburgh, Scotland	Scotland	13–8	16–20	2024 Six Nations
16	10 March 2024	Millennium Stadium, Cardiff, Wales	Wales	10–11	24–45	2024 Six Nations
17	16 March 2024	Parc Olympique Lyonnais, Lyon, France	England	28–24	33–31	2024 Six Nations

== Honours ==
France

- 2× Six Nations Championship: 2022, 2025
- 1× Grand Slam: 2022

== Personal life ==
Born in France, Fickou is one of six children. His father is originally from Casamance in Senegal and his mother is French of Pied-Noir descent.
