= Mathieu Babillot =

French rugby union player (born 1993)

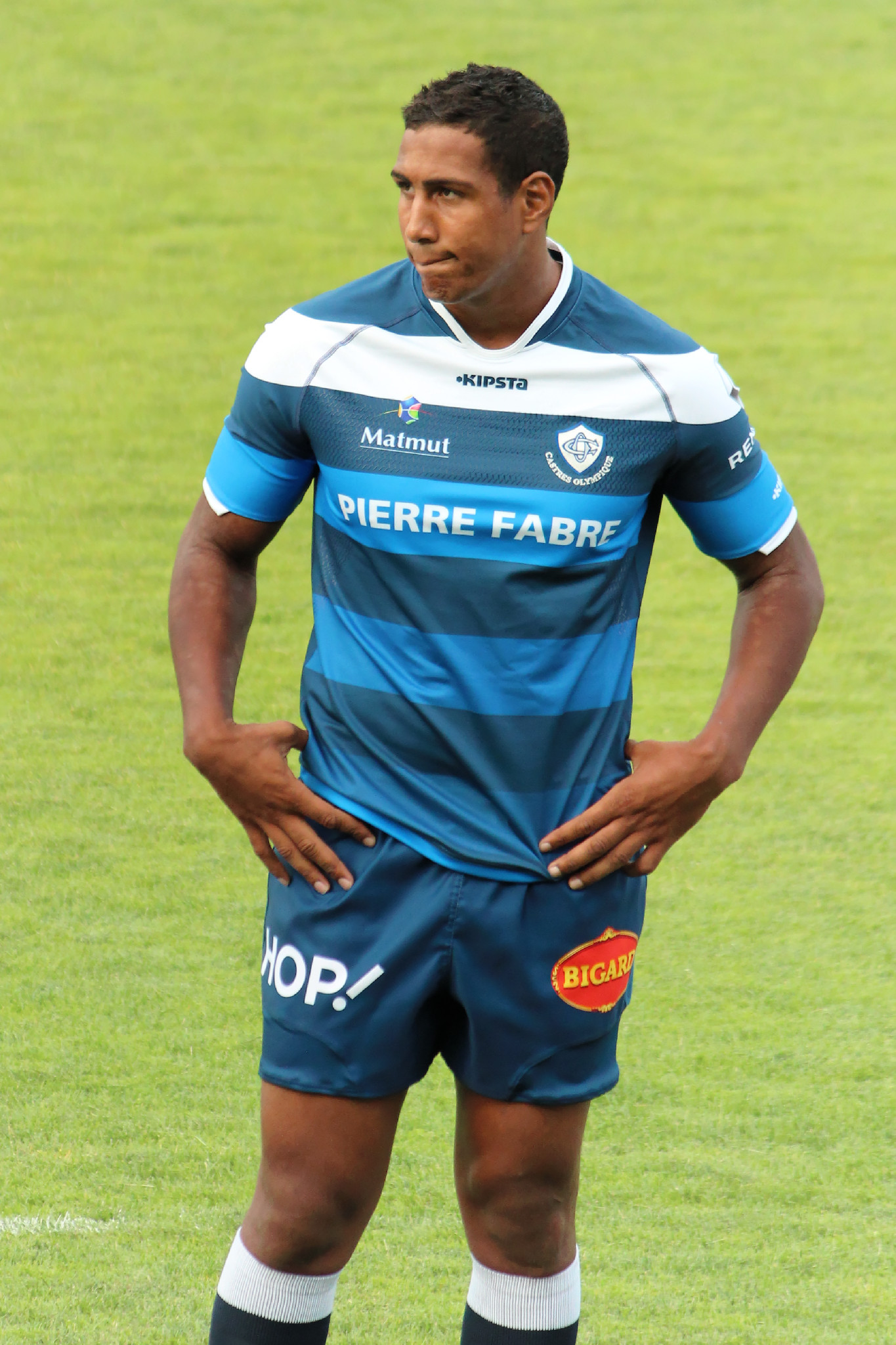
- Babillot with Castres in 2015
- Born: 9 September 1993 (age 33) Chartres, France
- Height: 1.90 m (6 ft 3 in)
- Weight: 109 kg (17 st 2 lb)

Rugby union career
- Position: Flanker
- Current team: Castres
Senior career
Years	Team	Apps	(Points)
2013–	Castres	141	(15)
- Correct as of 3 April 2022
International career
Years	Team	Apps	(Points)
2013	France U20	10	(0)
2018–	France	5	(0)
- Correct as of 17 November 2018

Mathieu Babillot (born 9 September 1993) is a French rugby union player. His usual position is as a flanker, and he currently plays for Castres Olympique in the Top 14 and the France national team.

== International career ==
Babillot was called up to the French national team again ahead of France's third 2018 Six Nations Championship match against Italy.

== Honours ==
=== Club ===
(France) Castres

- Top 14: 2017–18
