= Dany Priso =

French rugby union player (born 1994)

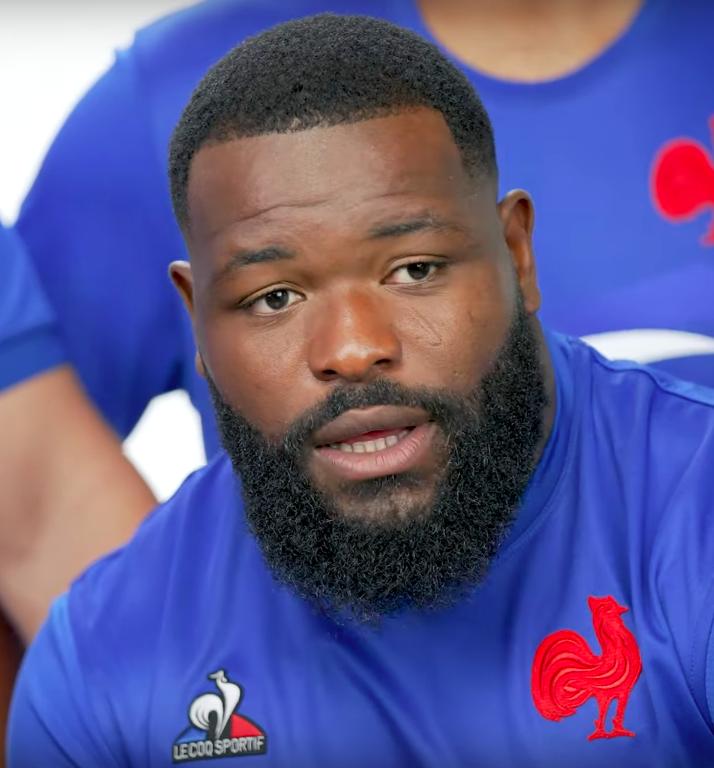
- Priso with France in 2022
- Born: Dany Priso Mouangue; 2 January 1994 (age 32) Loum, Cameroon
- Height: 1.82 m (5 ft 11 1/2 in)
- Weight: 112 kg (17 st 9 lb; 247 lb)

Rugby union career
- Position: Prop
- Current team: Toulon
Amateur team(s)
Years	Team	Apps	(Points)
- US Ussel
–2015	Limoges		
Senior career
Years	Team	Apps	(Points)
2015–2016	Stade Français	6	(0)
2016–2022	La Rochelle	130	(55)
2022–	Toulon	86	(35)
- Correct as of 1 December 2022
International career
Years	Team	Apps	(Points)
2018–	France	18	(0)
- Correct as of 20 November 2022

Dany Priso Mouangue (born 2 January 1994) is a French rugby union player. His position is prop and he currently plays for Toulon in the Top 14. He began his career at Stade Français.

== International career ==
Priso was called up to the French national team for the first time ahead of France's opening 2018 Six Nations Championship match against Ireland. He made his debut in that game coming on for Jefferson Poirot in the 55th minute of an eventual 13–15 home loss.

== Personal life ==
Priso was born in Cameroon and moved to Ussel at age 11. He became interested in rugby after watching a game at a local park.

== Honours ==
=== Club ===
(France) La Rochelle

- European Rugby Champions Cup: 2021–22

France

- 2x Six Nations Championship: 2025, 2026
