= Rémy Grosso =

French rugby union player (born 1988)

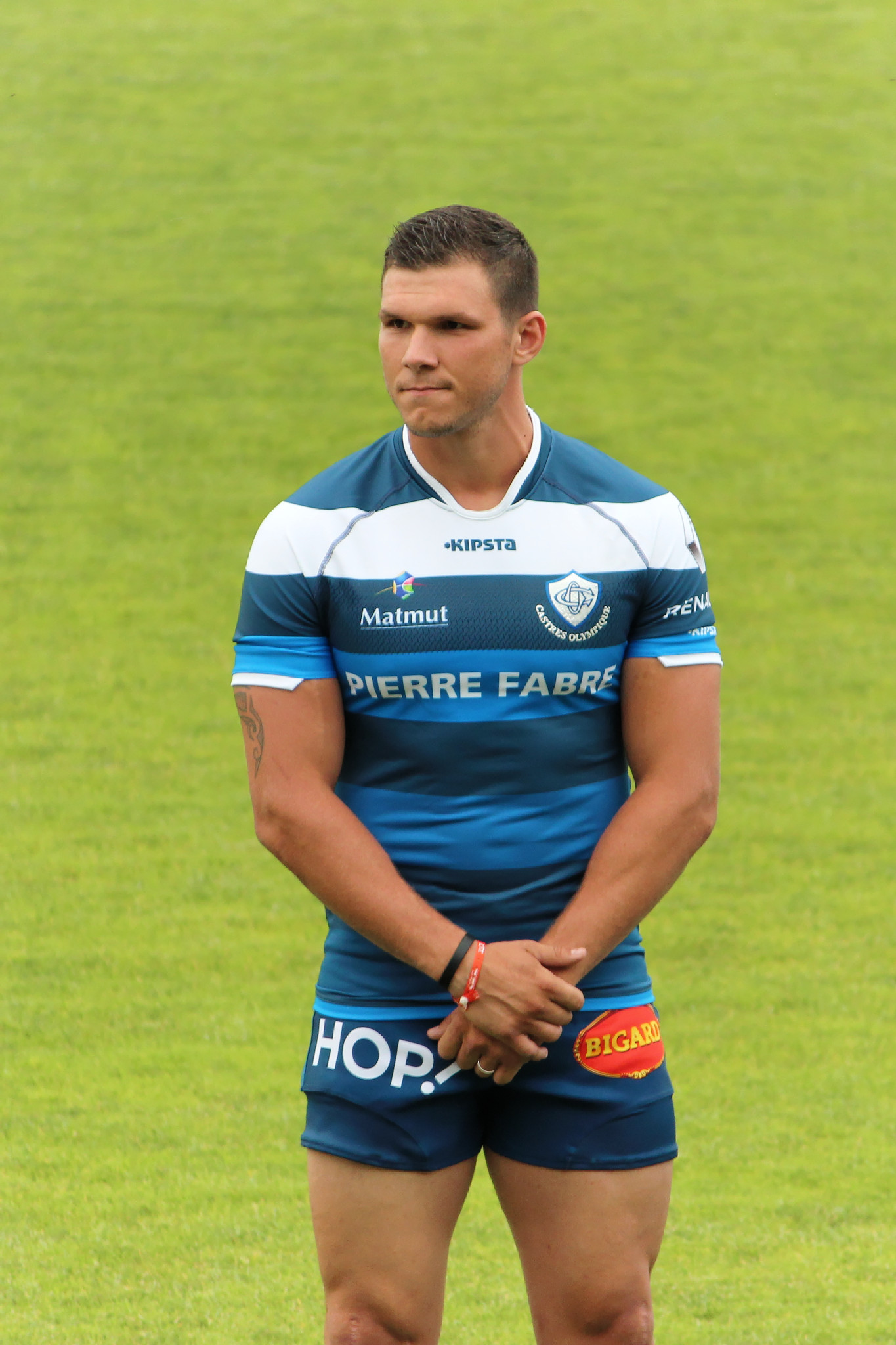
- Born: Rémy Grosso; 4 December 1988 (age 37) Lyon, France
- Height: 1.89 m (6 ft 2 in)
- Weight: 103 kg (16 st 3 lb)

Rugby union career
- Position: Wing
Senior career
Years	Team	Apps	(Points)
2008–2013	Lyon	60	(115)
2013–2017	Castres	63	(90)
2017–2020	Clermont	50	(65)
2020–2021	Lyon	5	(0)
- Correct as of 22 December 2022
International career
Years	Team	Apps	(Points)
2015–2018	France	5	(10)
- Correct as of 22 December 2022

Rémy Grosso (born 4 December 1988) is a former French professional rugby union player. He played at wing for ASM Clermont Auvergne in the Top 14.

He was a late call up to the French squad for the 2015 Rugby World Cup, replacing the injured Yoann Huget. He subsequently made his debut for France at the tournament and scored a try in the process against Canada.

== International tries ==
#	Date	Venue	Cap	Opponent	Result (France-...)	Competition
1.	1 October 2015	Stadium mk, Milton Keynes, England	1	Canada	41–18	2015 Rugby World Cup
2.	9 June 2018	Eden Park, Auckland, New Zealand	5	New Zealand	11–52	Test Match
