= Teddy Thomas (rugby union) =

French international rugby union player

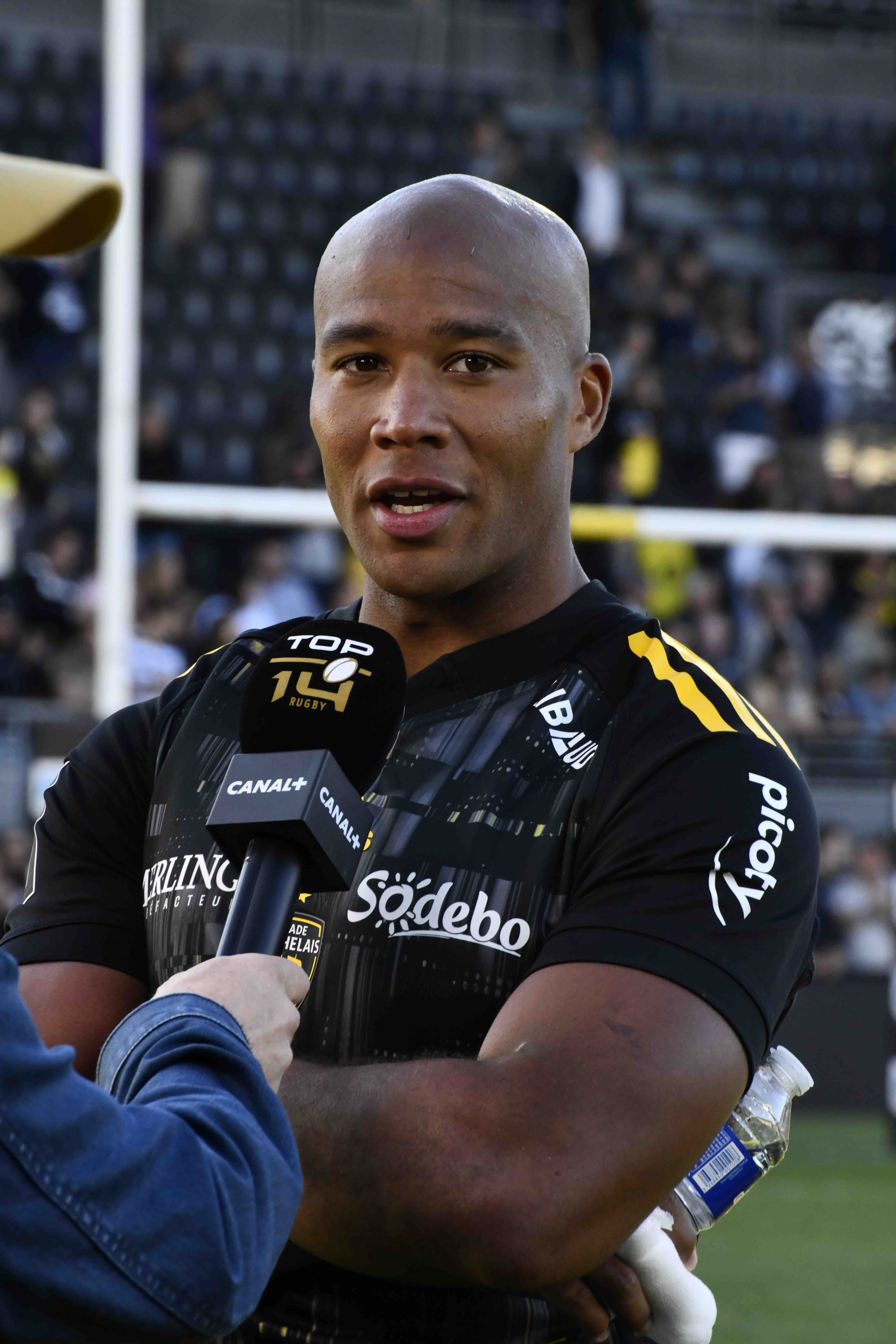
- Thomas with La Rochelle in 2022
- Born: Teddy Thomas; 18 September 1993 (age 33) Biarritz, France
- Height: 1.85 m (6 ft 1 in)
- Weight: 94 kg (14 st 11 lb; 207 lb)

Rugby union career
- Position(s): Wing, Fullback
- Current team: Toulouse
Senior career
Years	Team	Apps	(Points)
2012–2014	Biarritz	27	(55)
2014–2022	Racing 92	111	(315)
2022–2025	La Rochelle	61	(95)
2025–	Toulouse	0	(0)
- Correct as of 31 July 2025
International career
Years	Team	Apps	(Points)
2012	France U18	8	(5)
2013	France U20	6	(10)
2014–2021	France	28	(75)
- Correct as of 17 July 2021
National sevens team
Years	Team		Comps
2012	France 7's		World Series

Teddy Thomas (born 18 September 1993) is a French international rugby union player who plays on the wing for Toulouse in the Top 14.

== Early life ==
Thomas was raised by his French mother. His father was from Mali, played professional football in France, but disappeared before Thomas' birth. Thomas chose to use his middle name as his surname. Thomas was encouraged to play rugby by his grandfather and uncle.

== Career ==
=== Club ===
Thomas began his professional rugby career in 2012 playing for Biarritz Olympique during the 2012–13 Top 14 season. He made his French Top 14 debut against Toulon on 9 March 2013, coming off the bench during the final 10 minutes of the 50–15 thrashing. He went on to play a further four matches that season, earning his first start against Grenoble on 29 March 2013. He scored four tries in his debut professional season, picking up a double against Perpignan and Stade Français, while also making a break in the dying minutes of the Stade Français, to set up a try for Takudzwa Ngwenya. During that season, he also made his European debut in the 2012–13 Heineken Cup - though he made his debut against Gloucester in the 2012–13 European Challenge Cup after Biarritz dropped down from the leading tier. He scored two tries on his European debut, causing all sorts of problems for his opposite defender Charlie Sharples. In his second year with Biarritz, he appeared 20 times, only acting as a substitute just once that season. His team failed to impress on the European stage, finishing second in its pool in the 2013–14 European Challenge Cup, while in the French League, finishing last in the table with just five wins. By virtue of finishing last, Biarritz were relegated and Thomas was released from his contract. On 6 June 2014, Racing Métro announced the signing of the promising winger for the 2014–15 Top 14 season. He made his debut in Round 2 of the season, starting in the 30–21 loss to Bordeaux Bègles, and scoring a try on his Racing Métro debut.

=== National team ===
Thomas has played for France through age grade level and senior level. He was part of the France U18s side that participated in the 2011 European Under-18 Rugby Union Championship in France, finishing fourth behind Ireland, England and Wales. He also played for the France U20s team during the 2013 Six Nations Under 20s Championship - finishing fifth with two wins, and played in the 2013 IRB Junior World Championship in France. Though at home, the French U20s team finished third in their pool, and set up a quarter-final against Ireland U20s, winning 9–8. They challenged Argentina U20s in the 5th place game, in which Thomas scored two tries to help France secure a 37–34 win and an overall 5th place.

His form and try scoring ability earned him a call-up to the France national team by Philippe Saint-André for their 2014 November test series against Fiji, Australia and Argentina. He made his debut against Fiji, starting on the left wing, and scoring within the first minute of the match. He then went on to score a further two tries, which came just 2 minutes apart from each other. Although injured in the first game of the 2015 Six Nations he did receive a KS winners medal.

==== International tries ====
#	Date	Venue	Opponent	Result (FRA–Opponent)	Competition
1	8 November 2014	Stade Vélodrome, Marseille, France	Fiji	40–15	2014 November test series
2	8 November 2014	Stade Vélodrome, Marseille, France	Fiji	40–15	2014 November test series
3	8 November 2014	Stade Vélodrome, Marseille, France	Fiji	40–15	2014 November test series
4	15 November 2014	Stade de France, Saint-Denis, France	Australia	29–26	2014 November test series
5	11 November 2017	Stade de France, Saint-Denis, France	New Zealand	18–38	2017 November test series
6	3 February 2018	Stade de France, Saint-Denis, France	Ireland	13–15	2018 Six Nations
7	11 February 2018	Murrayfield, Edinburgh, Scotland	Scotland	26–32	2018 Six Nations
8	11 February 2018	Murrayfield, Edinburgh, Scotland	Scotland	26–32	2018 Six Nations
9	17 November 2018	Stade Pierre-Mauroy, Lille, France	Argentina	28–13	2018 November test series
10	17 November 2018	Stade Pierre-Mauroy, Lille, France	Argentina	28–13	2018 November test series
11	9 February 2020	Stade de France, Saint-Denis, France	Italy	35–22	2020 Six Nations
12	24 October 2020	Stade de France, Saint-Denis, France	Wales	38–21	Test Match
13	28 November 2020	Stade de France, Saint-Denis, France	Italy	36–5	Autumn Nations Cup
14	6 February 2021	Stadio Olimpico, Rome, Italy	Italy	50–10	2021 Six Nations
15	6 February 2021	Stadio Olimpico, Rome, Italy	Italy	50–10	2021 Six Nations
