= Tommaso Castello =

Italian rugby union player

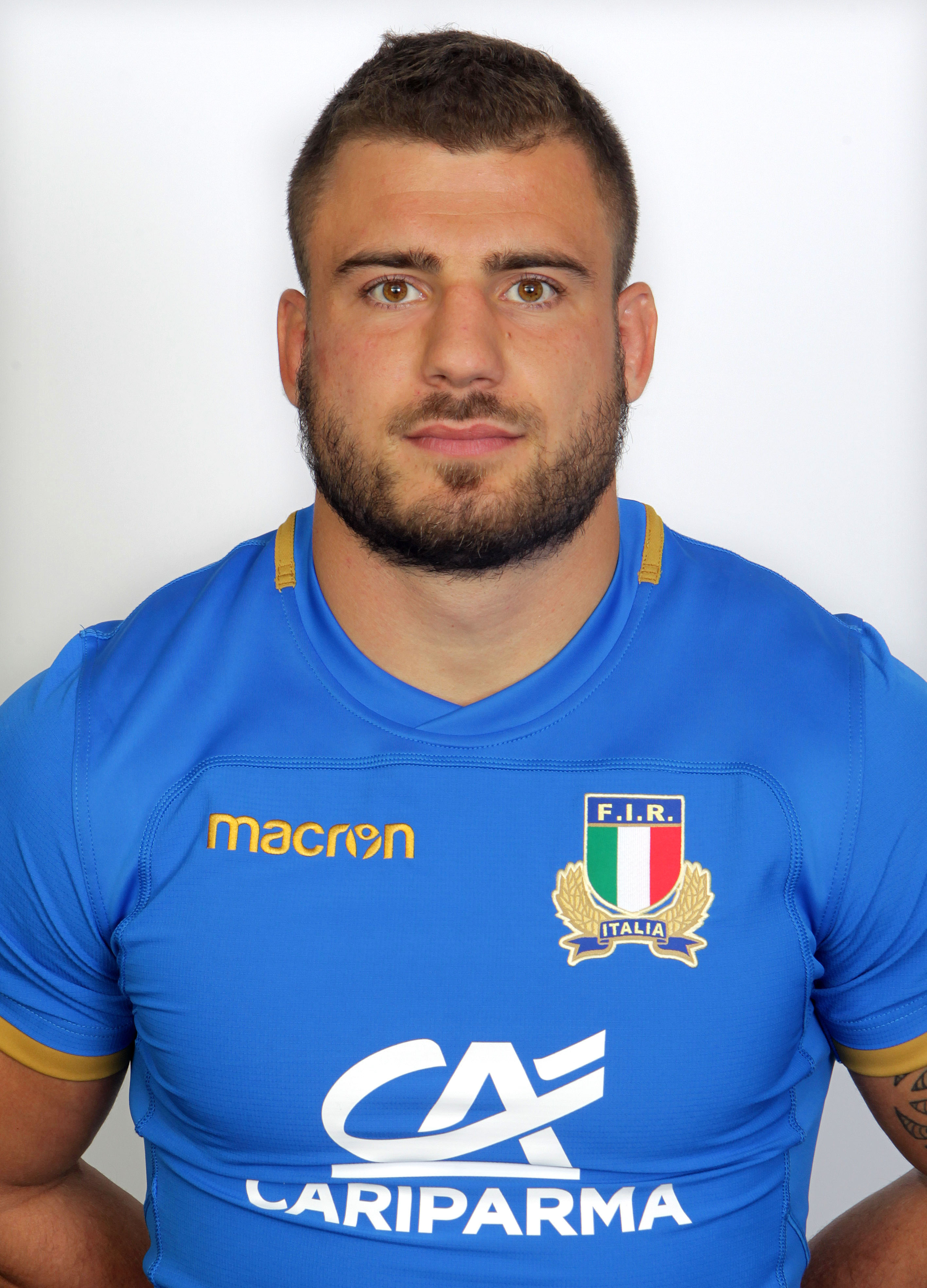
- Born: 14 August 1991 (age 35) Genoa, Italy
- Height: 1.83 m (6 ft 0 in)
- Weight: 100 kg (15 st 10 lb; 220 lb)

Rugby union career
- Position: Centre
- Current team: Zebre
Youth career
- CUS Genova Rugby
Senior career
| Years | Team | Apps | (Points) |
| 2011−2016 | Calvisano | 102 | (80) |
| 2015−2016 | →Zebre | 4 | (0) |
| 2016−2021 | Zebre | 50 | (30) |
- Correct as of 27 Dec 2021
International career
| Years | Team | Apps | (Points) |
| 2011 | Italy Under 20 | 7 | (5) |
| 2012−2013 | Emerging Italy | 4 | (5) |
| 2016−2019 | Italy | 18 | (0) |
- Correct as of 29 Dec 2020

Tommaso Castello (Italian pronunciation: [tomˈmaːzo kaˈstɛllo]; born 14 August 1991) is a retired Italian rugby union player. His usual position was as a Centre, and he represented Italy on 18 occasions.

For 2015–16 Pro12 season, he named like Additional Player for Zebre. From 2016–17 Pro12 season to 2021–22 United Rugby Championship season, he played for Zebre.

In 2011 Castello was named in the Italy Under 20 squad and in 2012 and 2013 he was part of Emerging Italy squad. From 2016 he was also named in the Italy squad.

He retired from rugby on 27 December 2021 after failing to recover from an injury he suffered in March 2019.
