= Yacouba Camara =

France international rugby union player

Yacouba Mandingo Camara
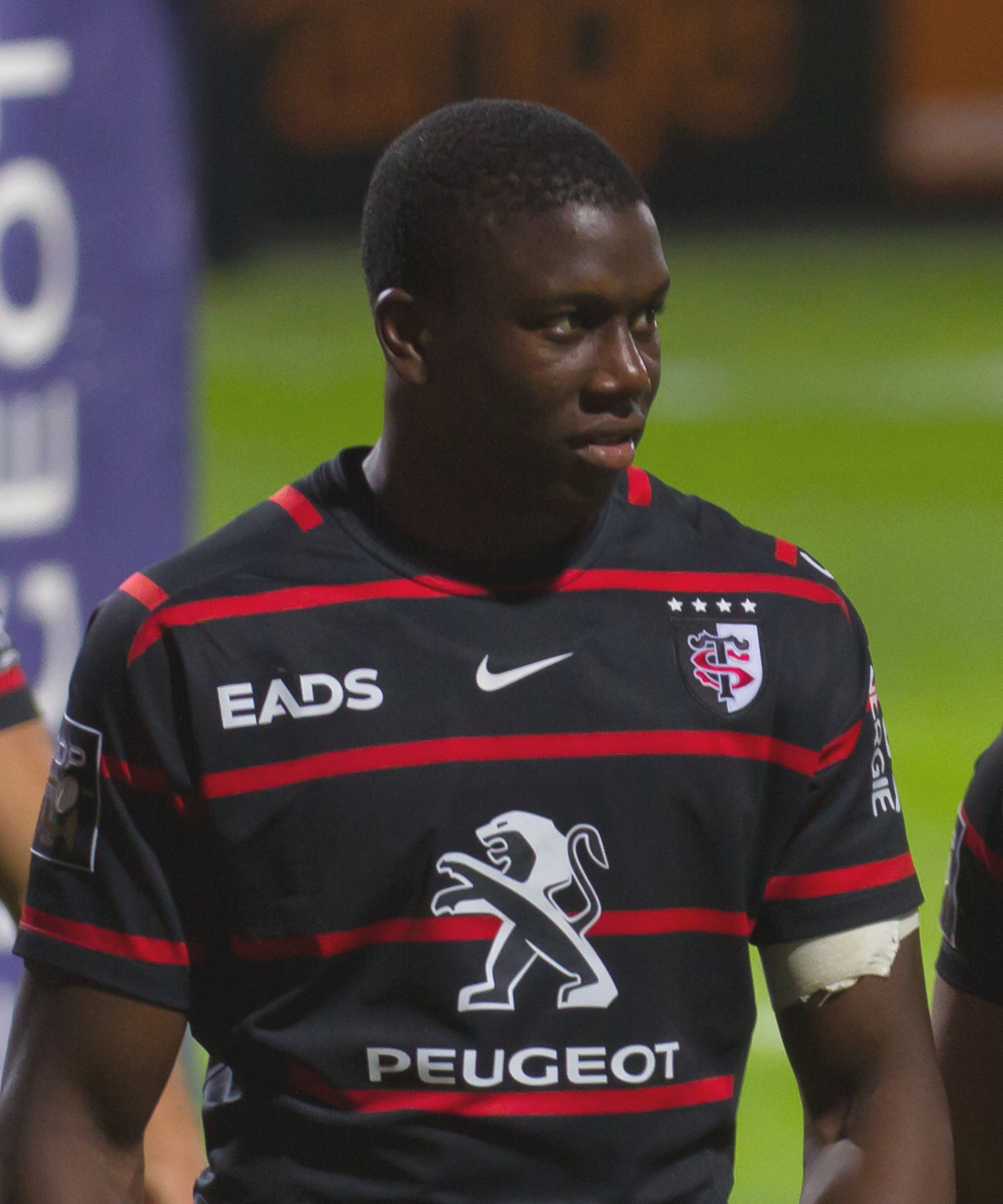
- Camara with Toulouse in 2013
- Born: 2 June 1994 (age 32) Aubervilliers, France
- Height: 1.94 m (6 ft 4 1/2 in)
- Weight: 101.5 kg (224 lb; 16 st 0 lb)

Rugby union career
- Position: Flanker
Senior career
Years	Team	Apps	(Points)
2012–2013	Massy	5	(0)
2013–2017	Toulouse	72	(20)
2017–	Montpellier	83	(20)
- Correct as of 24 June 2022
International career
Years	Team	Apps	(Points)
2013–2014	France U20	16	(0)
2016–19	France	11	(0)
2026–	Mali	2	
- Correct as of 6 October 2019

Yacouba Mandingo Camara (born 2 June 1994) is a French rugby union player who currently plays for Montpellier in the French Top 14. His regular playing position is as a Flanker.

== Club career ==
Camara made his debut for Toulouse in the 2013–14 season, aged 19. He transferred to Montpellier Hérault Rugby in 2017.

== International career ==
Camara was born in France and is of Malian descent. He has starred for the French national u-20 side and was included in Guy Noves' 30-man 6 Nations squad for the 2016 campaign.
