= George Ayoub =

- Born: George Joseph Peter Ayoub; 23 October 1963 (age 63) Sydney, Australia

Rugby union career
Refereeing career
Years	Competition	Apps
2001–2007	Test Matches	
2000–2004	Super Rugby	
–	IRB Sevens World Series	

George Ayoub (born 23 October 1963) is an Australian professional rugby union referee. He is currently a member of the Super Rugby panel for Television Match Officials (known as TMO), and is a former Test Match referee.

Born in Sydney, Ayoub trained as a teacher and took up refereeing in 1990 when he was a schoolmaster at St Patrick's College, Strathfield. By 1995 he was refereeing senior rugby in Sydney and he was selected on the Australian referees panel in 1996. He made his Super Rugby debut in May 2000, refereeing a Super 12 match between the Sharks and Chiefs in Durban.

Ayoub was appointed to his first Test in May 2002 between Japan and Tonga, and went on to referee 3 Tests and 17 Super Rugby matches before he retired at the end of 2007. In 2008 he returned to international rugby as a TMO.
