= Adrien Pélissié =

French rugby union player (born 1990)

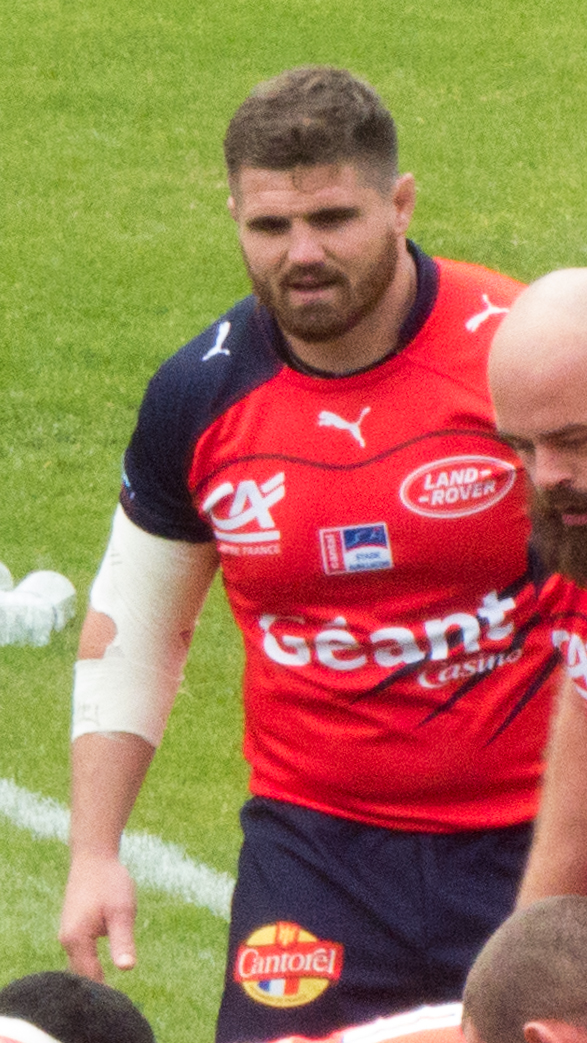
- Pélissié at 2016–17 Rugby Pro D2 season
- Born: Adrien Pélissié; 7 August 1990 (age 36) Septfonds, France
- Height: 1.8 m (5 ft 11 in)
- Weight: 106 kg (16 st 10 lb)

Rugby union career
- Position: Hooker
- Current team: Clermont Auvergne
Senior career
Years	Team	Apps	(Points)
2013–2017	Aurillac	95	(60)
2017–2020	Bordeaux Bègles	70	(40)
2021–	Clermont Auvergne	42	(25)
- Correct as of 27 January 2018
International career
Years	Team	Apps	(Points)
2018–	France	7	(0)
- Correct as of 23 June 2018

Adrien Pélissié (born 7 August 1990) is a French rugby union player. His position is hooker and he currently plays for Clermont Auvergne in the Top 14.
