= Kélian Galletier =

French rugby union player (born 1992)

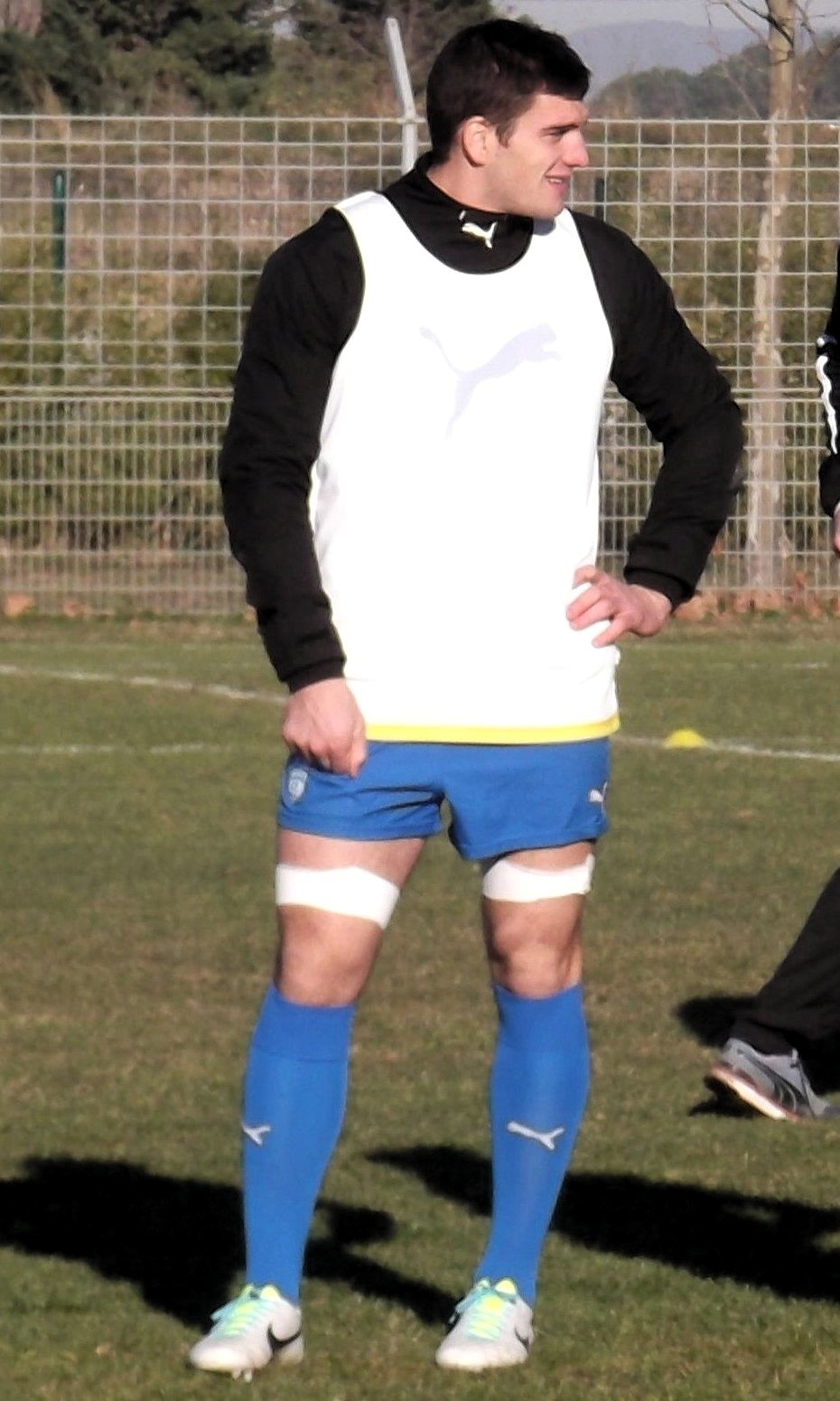
- Born: Kélian Galletier; 18 March 1992 (age 34) Montpellier, France
- Height: 1.88 m (6 ft 2 in)
- Weight: 101 kg (15 st 13 lb; 223 lb)

Rugby union career
- Position(s): Flanker, No.8
- Current team: Montpellier
Youth career
- 2001–2006: Pic Saint Loup
- 2006–2011: Montpellier
Senior career
Years	Team	Apps	(Points)
2011–	Montpellier	125	(70)
- Correct as of 24 November 2018
International career
Years	Team	Apps	(Points)
2016–	France	6	(0)
- Correct as of 24 November 2018

Kélian Galletier (born 18 March 1992) is a French rugby union player who plays for Montpellier in the Top 14 club competition. He currently plays as blindside flanker or number-eight.

He was selected for the French national team for the 2016 Summer Internationals after his performances in the Top 14.
