= Benjamin Fall =

France international rugby union player

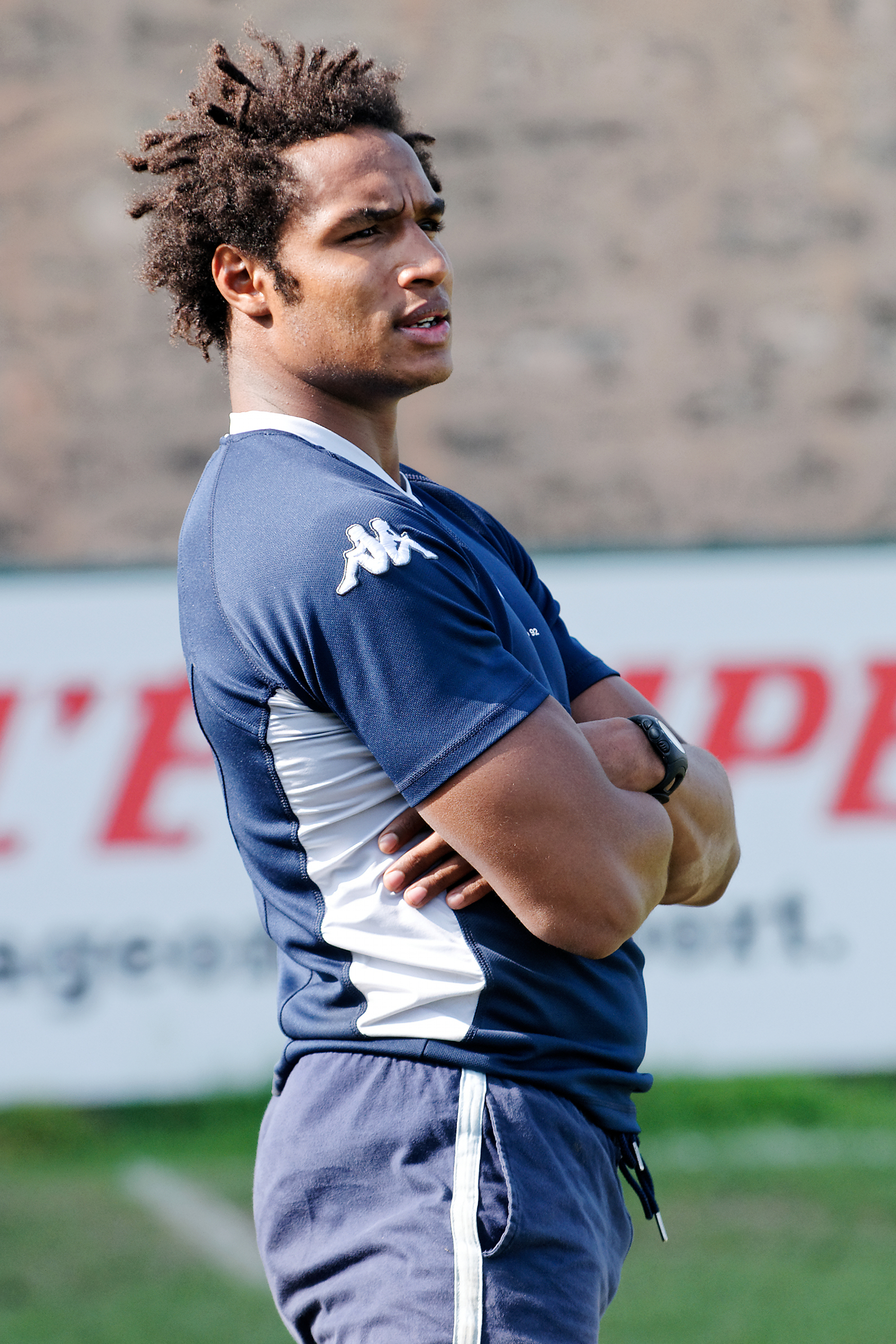
- Born: 3 March 1989 (age 37) Langon, France
- Height: 1.86 m (6 ft 1 in)
- Weight: 90 kg (198 lb; 14 st 2 lb)

Rugby union career
- Position: Wing
Senior career
Years	Team	Apps	(Points)
2007–2008	Bordeaux	12	(15)
2008–2010	Bayonne	35	(45)
2010–2014	Racing 92	57	(30)
2014–2020	Montpellier	98	(80)
2020-2021	Oyonnax Rugby		
- Correct as of 4 November 2024
International career
Years	Team	Apps	(Points)
2009–2018	France	14	(15)
- Correct as of 24 November 2018

Benjamin Fall (born 3 March 1989) is a former French rugby player. He played as a wing. He was part of the 2008 IRB Junior World Championship playing for France, playing 4 games and scoring 2 tries. He then played for Union Bordeaux Bègles in the 2007–08 Rugby Pro D2 season, playing 12 games and scoring 3 tries before being moved to Bayonne. He was selected for the French national team for the 2009 Autumn Internationals after his performances in the Top 14.

Fall took part in the 2010 Six Nations Championship for France, starting on the wing against Scotland.

Benjamin Fall moved to the Parisian club Racing Métro for the 2010–11 season.; then he joined Montpellier for the 2014–15 season.

== Honours ==
- 2010 Six Nations Championship
- 2015–16 European Rugby Challenge Cup : winner.
