= Geoffrey Doumayrou =

France international rugby union player

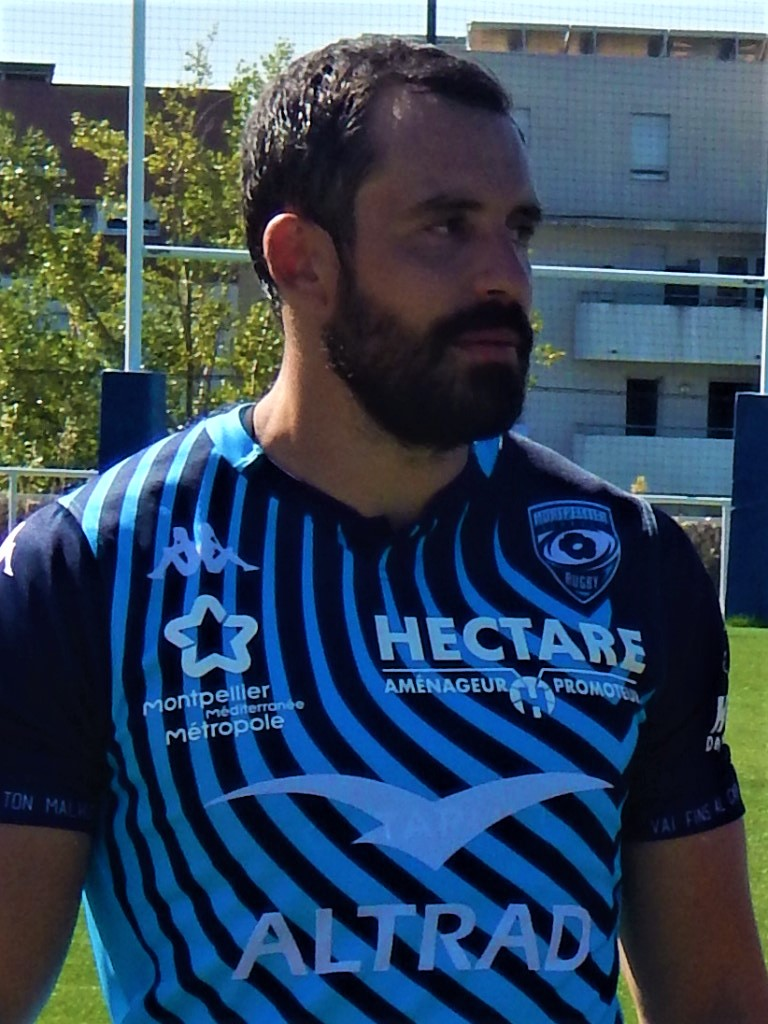
- Born: Geoffrey Doumayrou; 16 September 1989 (age 37) Montpellier, France
- Height: 1.86 m (6 ft 1 in)
- Weight: 92 kg (14 st 7 lb; 203 lb)

Rugby union career
- Position: Centre
Senior career
Years	Team	Apps	(Points)
2009–2012	Montpellier	59	(40)
2012–2017	Stade Français	103	(75)
2017–2021	La Rochelle	68	(78)
2021–2024	Montpellier	27	(15)
International career
Years	Team	Apps	(Points)
2009	France U20	9	(25)
2017–2019	France	13	(0)
Coaching career
- Years: Team
- 2026–: France (defence)

Geoffrey Doumayrou (born 16 September 1989) is a French rugby union coach and former player. He played as a centre in the Top 14 and for the France national rugby union team.

Doumayrou began his career at Montpellier Hérault in his hometown. He made his Top 14 debut in January 2009 against Clermont Auvergne. He went on to make 59 appearances over the following four seasons, scoring a total of 8 tries in the process.

He joined Stade Français ahead of the 2012-13 Top 14 season. He made over 100 appearances for the club, scoring 25 tries in a five-year period that saw them win the 2014–15 Top 14 and the European Challenge Cup in the 2016–17 season.

Doumayrou joined Stade Rochelais ahead of the 2017–18 Top 14 season. At La Rochelle, he was part of the team that reached the final of the 2018–19 European Rugby Challenge Cup, the 2019–20 Top 14, and the 2020–21 European Rugby Champions Cup, finishing as runners-up on all three occasions.

He made his international debut for France against New Zealand during the 2017 end-of-year rugby union internationals. In total, Doumayrou won 13 caps for his country between 2017 and 2019.

In 2021, he returned to Montpellier Hérault. In his first season back at Stade Yves-du-Manoir, the club became champions of France for the first time. Doumayrou retired from playing in 2024 and took up the role of defence coach at Montpellier.

== Honours ==
Stade Français

- 1× Top 14: 2014–15
- 1× European Challenge Cup: 2016–17

Montpellier

- 1× Top 14: 2021–22
