= Rabah Slimani =

French rugby union player (born 1989)

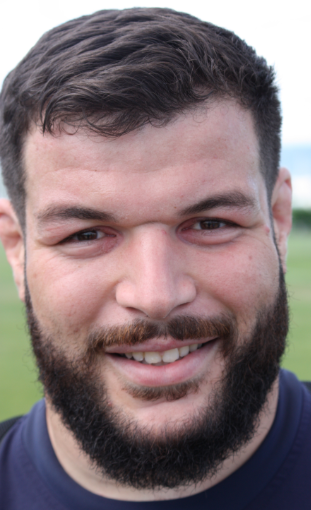
- Slimani in 2017
- Born: 18 October 1989 (age 37) Sarcelles, France
- Height: 1.78 m (5 ft 10 in)
- Weight: 119 kg (18 st 10 lb; 262 lb)

Rugby union career
- Position: Prop
Senior career
Years	Team	Apps	(Points)
2008–2017	Stade Français	187	(25)
2017–2024	Clermont	148	(5)
2024–	Leinster	23	(5)
- Correct as of 13 June 2025
International career
Years	Team	Apps	(Points)
2010	France A	3	(0)
2013–	France	59	(20)
- Correct as of 19 July 2025

Rabah Slimani (born 18 October 1989) is a French rugby union player who plays as a prop for the Irish URC side Leinster and the France national team.

== Career ==
Slimani first discovered rugby in his home town of Sarcelles. While playing for AAS Sarcelles, he was spotted by Stade Français cadets and was invited to train with the squad in 2008. He made his professional club debut in 2009, and made his international debut with France, coming off the bench against New Zealand on 9 November 2013 at the Stade de France.

== Personal life ==
Born in France, Slimani is of Algerian descent.

== Honours ==
Clermont

- 1× Top 14: 2017
- 1× European Rugby Challenge Cup: 2019

Leinster

- 2× URC: 2025 and 2026
