= 2019 Six Nations Championship squads =

Rugby union competition squads

This is a list of the complete squads for the 2019 Six Nations Championship, an annual rugby union tournament contested by the national rugby teams of England, France, Ireland, Italy, Scotland and Wales. Ireland were the defending champions.

Note: Number of caps and players' ages are indicated as of 1 February 2019 – the tournament's opening day. For players added to a squad during the tournament, their caps and age are indicated as of the date of their call-up.

== England ==
On 17 January, England named a 35-man squad ahead of the 2019 Six Nations Championship.

Head coach: (Australia) Eddie Jones

Player	Position	Date of birth (age)	Caps	Club/province
Luke Cowan-Dickie	Hooker	20 June 1993 (aged 25)	9	(England) Exeter Chiefs
Jamie George	Hooker	20 October 1990 (aged 28)	32	(England) Saracens
Jack Singleton	Hooker	14 May 1996 (aged 22)	0	(England) Worcester Warriors
Dan Cole	Prop	9 May 1987 (aged 31)	82	(England) Leicester Tigers
Ellis Genge	Prop	16 February 1995 (aged 23)	5	(England) Leicester Tigers
Ben Moon	Prop	15 July 1989 (aged 29)	4	(England) Exeter Chiefs
Kyle Sinckler	Prop	30 March 1992 (aged 26)	17	(England) Harlequins
Mako Vunipola	Prop	14 January 1991 (aged 28)	52	(England) Saracens
Harry Williams	Prop	1 December 1991 (aged 27)	14	(England) Exeter Chiefs
Maro Itoje	Lock	28 October 1994 (aged 24)	26	(England) Saracens
George Kruis	Lock	22 February 1990 (aged 28)	27	(England) Saracens
Joe Launchbury	Lock	12 April 1991 (aged 27)	54	(England) Wasps
Courtney Lawes	Lock	23 February 1989 (aged 29)	68	(England) Northampton Saints
Tom Curry	Back row	15 June 1998 (aged 20)	5	(England) Sale Sharks
Jack Clifford	Back row	12 February 1993 (aged 25)	7	(England) Harlequins
Ben Earl	Back row	7 January 1998 (aged 21)	0	(England) Saracens
Nathan Hughes	Back row	10 June 1991 (aged 27)	17	(England) Wasps
Brad Shields	Back row	2 April 1991 (aged 27)	5	(England) Wasps
Billy Vunipola	Back row	3 November 1992 (aged 26)	36	(England) Saracens
Mark Wilson	Back row	6 October 1989 (aged 29)	8	(England) Newcastle Falcons
Dan Robson	Scrum-half	14 March 1992 (aged 26)	0	(England) Wasps
Ben Youngs	Scrum-half	5 September 1989 (aged 29)	80	(England) Leicester Tigers
George Ford	Fly-half	16 March 1993 (aged 25)	51	(England) Leicester Tigers
Owen Farrell (c)	Fly-half	24 September 1991 (aged 27)	65	(England) Saracens
Henry Slade	Centre	19 March 1993 (aged 25)	17	(England) Exeter Chiefs
Ollie Devoto	Centre	22 September 1993 (aged 25)	1	(England) Exeter Chiefs
Ben Te'o	Centre	27 January 1987 (aged 32)	16	(England) Worcester Warriors
Manu Tuilagi	Centre	18 May 1991 (aged 27)	27	(England) Leicester Tigers
Chris Ashton	Wing	29 March 1987 (aged 31)	42	(England) Sale Sharks
Joe Cokanasiga	Wing	15 November 1997 (aged 21)	2	(England) Bath
Elliot Daly	Wing	8 October 1992 (aged 26)	25	(England) Wasps
Jonny May	Wing	1 April 1990 (aged 28)	40	(England) Leicester Tigers
Jack Nowell	Wing	11 April 1993 (aged 25)	29	(England) Exeter Chiefs
Ollie Thorley	Wing	11 September 1996 (aged 22)	0	(England) Gloucester
Mike Brown	Fullback	4 September 1985 (aged 33)	72	(England) Harlequins

=== Call-ups ===
On 5 February, Nick Isiekwe was called up to the squad.

On 4 March, Chris Robshaw and Jonathan Joseph were announced in the squad.

Player	Position	Date of birth (age)	Caps	Club/province
Nick Isiekwe	Lock	20 April 1998 (aged 20)	3	(England) Saracens
Chris Robshaw	Back row	4 June 1986 (aged 32)	66	(England) Harlequins
Jonathan Joseph	Centre	21 May 1991 (aged 27)	40	(England) Bath

== France ==
On 9 January, Brunel named a 31-man squad ahead of the 2019 Six Nations.

Head coach: (France) Jacques Brunel

Player	Position	Date of birth (age)	Caps	Club/province
Pierre Bourgarit	Hooker	12 September 1997 (aged 21)	1	(France) La Rochelle
Guilhem Guirado (c)	Hooker	17 June 1986 (aged 32)	63	(France) Toulon
Julien Marchand	Hooker	10 May 1995 (aged 23)	1	(France) Toulouse
Dorian Aldegheri	Prop	4 August 1993 (aged 25)	0	(France) Toulouse
Uini Atonio	Prop	26 March 1990 (aged 28)	31	(France) La Rochelle
Demba Bamba	Prop	17 March 1998 (aged 20)	1	(France) Brive
Jefferson Poirot	Prop	1 November 1992 (aged 26)	22	(France) Bordeaux Bègles
Dany Priso	Prop	2 January 1994 (aged 25)	10	(France) La Rochelle
Arthur Iturria	Lock	13 May 1994 (aged 24)	6	(France) Clermont Auvergne
Félix Lambey	Lock	15 March 1994 (aged 24)	2	(France) Lyon
Sébastien Vahaamahina	Lock	21 October 1991 (aged 27)	36	(France) Clermont Auvergne
Paul Willemse	Lock	13 November 1992 (aged 26)	0	(France) Montpellier
Gregory Alldritt	Back row	23 March 1997 (aged 21)	0	(France) La Rochelle
Yacouba Camara	Back row	2 June 1994 (aged 24)	11	(France) Montpellier
Wenceslas Lauret	Back row	30 March 1988 (aged 30)	20	(France) Racing 92
Bernard Le Roux	Back row	4 June 1989 (aged 29)	11	(France) Racing 92
Louis Picamoles	Back row	5 February 1986 (aged 32)	72	(France) Montpellier
Antoine Dupont	Scrum-half	15 November 1996 (aged 22)	10	(France) Toulouse
Morgan Parra	Scrum-half	15 November 1988 (aged 30)	69	(France) Clermont Auvergne
Baptiste Serin	Scrum-half	20 June 1994 (aged 24)	23	(France) Bordeaux Bègles
Anthony Belleau	Fly-half	8 April 1996 (aged 22)	10	(France) Toulon
Camille Lopez	Fly-half	3 April 1989 (aged 29)	19	(France) Clermont Auvergne
Romain Ntamack	Fly-half	1 May 1999 (aged 19)	0	(France) Toulouse
Mathieu Bastareaud	Centre	17 September 1988 (aged 30)	50	(France) Toulon
Geoffrey Doumayrou	Centre	16 September 1989 (aged 29)	10	(France) La Rochelle
Gaël Fickou	Centre	26 March 1994 (aged 24)	41	(France) Stade Français
Wesley Fofana	Centre	20 January 1988 (aged 31)	45	(France) Clermont Auvergne
Damian Penaud	Centre	25 September 1996 (aged 22)	6	(France) Clermont Auvergne
Yoann Huget	Wing	2 June 1987 (aged 31)	53	(France) Toulouse
Maxime Médard	Fullback	16 November 1986 (aged 32)	52	(France) Toulouse
Thomas Ramos	Fullback	23 July 1995 (aged 23)	0	(France) Toulouse

=== Call-ups ===
On 22 January, Bernard Le Roux pulled out of the squad due to injury, and was replaced by Fabien Sanconnie.

On 5 February, Julien Marchand pulled out of the squad due to injury, and was replaced by Camille Chat.

On 16 February, Dany Priso was ruled out of the squad due to injury, and was replaced by Étienne Falgoux.

On 11 March, Dany Priso and Kélian Galletier were called up to replace the injured Jefferson Poirot and Wenceslas Lauret.

Player	Position	Date of birth (age)	Caps	Club/province
Camille Chat	Hooker	18 December 1995 (aged 23)	16	(France) Racing 92
Étienne Falgoux	Prop	19 January 1993 (aged 26)	0	(France) Clermont Auvergne
Kélian Galletier	Back row	18 March 1992 (aged 26)	6	(France) Montpellier
Fabien Sanconnie	Back row	21 February 1995 (aged 23)	5	(France) Racing 92

== Ireland ==
On 16 January, Joe Schmidt announced a 38-man squad for the 2019 Six Nations.

Head coach: (New Zealand) Joe Schmidt

Player	Position	Date of birth (age)	Caps	Club/province
Rory Best (c)	Hooker	15 August 1982 (aged 36)	113	(Ireland) Ulster
Seán Cronin	Hooker	6 May 1986 (aged 32)	65	(Ireland) Leinster
Niall Scannell	Hooker	8 April 1992 (aged 26)	11	(Ireland) Munster
Tadhg Furlong	Prop	14 November 1992 (aged 26)	28	(Ireland) Leinster
Cian Healy	Prop	7 October 1987 (aged 31)	84	(Ireland) Leinster
Dave Kilcoyne	Prop	14 December 1988 (aged 30)	24	(Ireland) Munster
Jack McGrath	Prop	11 October 1989 (aged 29)	53	(Ireland) Leinster
Andrew Porter	Prop	16 January 1996 (aged 23)	11	(Ireland) Leinster
John Ryan	Prop	2 August 1988 (aged 30)	16	(Ireland) Munster
Tadhg Beirne	Lock	8 January 1992 (aged 27)	4	(Ireland) Munster
Ultan Dillane	Lock	9 November 1993 (aged 25)	11	(Ireland) Connacht
Iain Henderson	Lock	21 February 1992 (aged 26)	42	(Ireland) Ulster
James Ryan	Lock	24 July 1996 (aged 22)	13	(Ireland) Leinster
Devin Toner	Lock	29 June 1986 (aged 32)	63	(Ireland) Leinster
Jack Conan	Back row	29 July 1992 (aged 26)	11	(Ireland) Leinster
Jordi Murphy	Back row	22 April 1991 (aged 27)	26	(Ireland) Ulster
Seán O'Brien	Back row	14 February 1987 (aged 31)	52	(Ireland) Leinster
Peter O'Mahony (vc)	Back row	17 September 1989 (aged 29)	52	(Ireland) Munster
Rhys Ruddock	Back row	13 November 1990 (aged 28)	21	(Ireland) Leinster
CJ Stander	Back row	5 April 1990 (aged 28)	28	(Ireland) Munster
Josh van der Flier	Back row	25 April 1993 (aged 25)	13	(Ireland) Leinster
Caolin Blade	Scrum-half	29 April 1994 (aged 24)	0	(Ireland) Connacht
John Cooney	Scrum-half	1 May 1990 (aged 28)	4	(Ireland) Ulster
Conor Murray	Scrum-half	20 April 1989 (aged 29)	67	(Ireland) Munster
Joey Carbery	Fly-half	1 November 1995 (aged 23)	16	(Ireland) Munster
Jack Carty	Fly-half	31 August 1992 (aged 26)	0	(Ireland) Connacht
Johnny Sexton (vc)	Fly-half	11 July 1985 (aged 33)	78	(Ireland) Leinster
Will Addison	Centre	20 August 1992 (aged 26)	3	(Ireland) Ulster
Bundee Aki	Centre	7 April 1990 (aged 28)	12	(Ireland) Connacht
Chris Farrell	Centre	16 March 1993 (aged 25)	3	(Ireland) Munster
Tom Farrell	Centre	1 October 1993 (aged 25)	0	(Ireland) Connacht
Robbie Henshaw	Centre	12 June 1993 (aged 25)	36	(Ireland) Leinster
Garry Ringrose	Centre	26 January 1995 (aged 24)	17	(Ireland) Leinster
Andrew Conway	Wing	11 July 1991 (aged 27)	10	(Ireland) Munster
Keith Earls	Wing	2 October 1987 (aged 31)	72	(Ireland) Munster
Jacob Stockdale	Wing	6 April 1996 (aged 22)	14	(Ireland) Ulster
Rob Kearney	Fullback	26 March 1986 (aged 32)	87	(Ireland) Leinster
Jordan Larmour	Fullback	10 June 1997 (aged 21)	9	(Ireland) Leinster

=== Call-ups ===
On 21 January, Tadhg Beirne was ruled out of the first two rounds of the competition, and Quinn Roux was called up in his place.

Player	Position	Date of birth (age)	Caps	Club/province
Quinn Roux	Lock	30 October 1990 (aged 28)	7	(Ireland) Connacht

== Italy ==
On 10 January, Conor O'Shea named a 31-man squad for Italy's 2019 Six Nations Championship.

Head coach: (Ireland) Conor O'Shea

Note: Flags indicate national union for the club/province as defined by World Rugby.

Player	Position	Date of birth (age)	Caps	Club/province
Luca Bigi	Hooker	19 April 1991 (aged 27)	15	(Italy) Benetton
Leonardo Ghiraldini	Hooker	26 December 1984 (aged 34)	99	(France) Toulouse
Simone Ferrari	Prop	28 March 1994 (aged 24)	17	(Italy) Benetton
Andrea Lovotti	Prop	28 July 1989 (aged 29)	30	(Italy) Zebre
Tiziano Pasquali	Prop	14 July 1994 (aged 24)	13	(Italy) Benetton
Cherif Traorè	Prop	10 April 1994 (aged 24)	5	(Italy) Benetton
Giosuè Zilocchi	Prop	15 January 1997 (aged 22)	2	(Italy) Zebre
Dean Budd	Lock	31 July 1986 (aged 32)	16	(Italy) Benetton
Federico Ruzza	Lock	4 August 1994 (aged 24)	7	(Italy) Benetton
Dave Sisi	Lock	5 February 1993 (aged 25)	0	(Italy) Zebre
Alessandro Zanni	Lock	31 January 1984 (aged 35)	109	(Italy) Benetton
Marco Barbini	Back row	16 October 1990 (aged 28)	2	(Italy) Benetton
Maxime Mbanda	Back row	10 April 1993 (aged 25)	15	(Italy) Zebre
Sebastian Negri	Back row	30 June 1994 (aged 24)	12	(Italy) Benetton
Sergio Parisse (c)	Back row	12 September 1983 (aged 35)	134	(France) Stade Français
Braam Steyn	Back row	2 May 1992 (aged 26)	25	(Italy) Benetton
Jimmy Tuivaiti	Back row	2 January 1988 (aged 31)	1	(Italy) Zebre
Guglielmo Palazzani	Scrum-half	11 April 1991 (aged 27)	28	(Italy) Zebre
Tito Tebaldi	Scrum-half	23 September 1987 (aged 31)	29	(Italy) Benetton
Tommaso Allan	Fly-half	26 April 1993 (aged 25)	43	(Italy) Benetton
Carlo Canna	Fly-half	25 August 1992 (aged 26)	32	(Italy) Zebre
Ian McKinley	Fly-half	4 December 1989 (aged 29)	4	(Italy) Benetton
Giulio Bisegni	Centre	4 April 1992 (aged 26)	11	(Italy) Zebre
Michele Campagnaro	Centre	13 March 1993 (aged 25)	38	(England) Wasps
Tommaso Castello	Centre	14 August 1991 (aged 27)	15	(Italy) Zebre
Luca Morisi	Centre	22 February 1991 (aged 27)	20	(Italy) Benetton
Tommaso Benvenuti	Wing	12 December 1990 (aged 28)	55	(Italy) Benetton
Angelo Esposito	Wing	14 June 1993 (aged 25)	15	(Italy) Benetton
Luca Sperandio	Wing	28 January 1996 (aged 23)	5	(Italy) Benetton
Jayden Hayward	Fullback	11 February 1987 (aged 31)	12	(Italy) Benetton
Edoardo Padovani	Fullback	15 May 1993 (aged 25)	15	(Italy) Zebre

=== Call-ups ===
On 16 January, Marco Fuser and Marco Zanon were added to the squad.

On 30 January, Nicola Quaglio was added to the squad.

On 4 February, Engjel Makelara and Edoardo Gori were added to the squad.

On 21 February, Marco Riccioni was called up to the squad

On 27 February, Oliviero Fabiani and Jake Polledri were added to the squad.

Player	Position	Date of birth (age)	Caps	Club/province
Oliviero Fabiani	Hooker	3 July 1990 (aged 28)	7	(Italy) Zebre
Engjel Makelara	Hooker	22 August 1996 (aged 22)	0	(Italy) Benetton
Nicola Quaglio	Prop	9 March 1991 (aged 27)	8	(Italy) Benetton
Marco Riccioni	Prop	19 October 1997 (aged 21)	0	(Italy) Benetton
Marco Fuser	Lock	9 March 1991 (aged 27)	33	(Italy) Benetton
Jake Polledri	Back row	8 November 1995 (aged 23)	6	(England) Gloucester
Edoardo Gori	Scrum-half	5 May 1990 (aged 28)	68	(Italy) Benetton
Marco Zanon	Centre	3 October 1997 (aged 21)	0	(Italy) Benetton

== Scotland ==
On 16 January, Gregor Townsend named a 39-man squad for the 2019 Six Nations Championship.

Head coach: (Scotland) Gregor Townsend

Player	Position	Date of birth (age)	Caps	Club/province
Dave Cherry	Hooker	3 January 1991 (aged 28)	0	(Scotland) Edinburgh
Jake Kerr	Hooker	13 April 1996 (aged 22)	0	(England) Leicester Tigers
Stuart McInally	Hooker	9 August 1990 (aged 28)	22	(Scotland) Edinburgh
Grant Stewart	Hooker	28 February 1995 (aged 23)	0	(Scotland) Glasgow Warriors
Alex Allan	Prop	29 February 1992 (aged 26)	7	(Scotland) Glasgow Warriors
Simon Berghan	Prop	7 December 1990 (aged 28)	14	(Scotland) Edinburgh
Jamie Bhatti	Prop	8 September 1993 (aged 25)	11	(Scotland) Glasgow Warriors
Allan Dell	Prop	16 March 1992 (aged 26)	17	(Scotland) Edinburgh
WP Nel	Prop	30 April 1986 (aged 32)	26	(Scotland) Edinburgh
D'Arcy Rae	Prop	21 December 1994 (aged 24)	0	(Scotland) Glasgow Warriors
Grant Gilchrist	Lock	9 August 1990 (aged 28)	28	(Scotland) Edinburgh
Jonny Gray	Lock	14 March 1994 (aged 24)	47	(Scotland) Glasgow Warriors
Sam Skinner	Lock	10 November 1994 (aged 24)	3	(England) Exeter Chiefs
Tim Swinson	Lock	17 February 1987 (aged 31)	38	(Scotland) Glasgow Warriors
Ben Toolis	Lock	31 March 1992 (aged 26)	14	(Scotland) Edinburgh
Adam Ashe	Back row	24 July 1993 (aged 25)	6	(Scotland) Glasgow Warriors
Gary Graham	Back row	29 August 1992 (aged 26)	0	(England) Newcastle Falcons
John Hardie	Back row	27 July 1988 (aged 30)	16	(England) Newcastle Falcons
Jamie Ritchie	Back row	16 August 1996 (aged 22)	6	(Scotland) Edinburgh
Josh Strauss	Back row	23 October 1986 (aged 32)	17	(England) Sale Sharks
Hamish Watson	Back row	15 October 1991 (aged 27)	23	(Scotland) Edinburgh
Ryan Wilson	Back row	18 May 1989 (aged 29)	41	(Scotland) Glasgow Warriors
George Horne	Scrum-half	12 May 1995 (aged 23)	4	(Scotland) Glasgow Warriors
Greig Laidlaw (c)	Scrum-half	12 October 1985 (aged 33)	66	(France) Clermont Auvergne
Ali Price	Scrum-half	12 May 1993 (aged 25)	19	(Scotland) Glasgow Warriors
Adam Hastings	Fly-half	5 October 1996 (aged 22)	7	(Scotland) Glasgow Warriors
Finn Russell	Fly-half	23 September 1992 (aged 26)	40	(France) Racing 92
Chris Dean	Centre	15 March 1994 (aged 24)	0	(Scotland) Edinburgh
Nick Grigg	Centre	18 September 1992 (aged 26)	6	(Scotland) Glasgow Warriors
Chris Harris	Centre	28 December 1990 (aged 28)	6	(England) Newcastle Falcons
Peter Horne	Centre	5 October 1989 (aged 29)	38	(Scotland) Glasgow Warriors
Sam Johnson	Centre	19 June 1993 (aged 25)	0	(Scotland) Glasgow Warriors
Huw Jones	Centre	17 December 1993 (aged 25)	19	(Scotland) Glasgow Warriors
Darcy Graham	Wing	21 June 1997 (aged 21)	1	(Scotland) Edinburgh
Lee Jones	Wing	28 June 1988 (aged 30)	10	(Scotland) Glasgow Warriors
Sean Maitland	Wing	14 September 1988 (aged 30)	37	(England) Saracens
Tommy Seymour	Wing	1 July 1988 (aged 30)	46	(Scotland) Glasgow Warriors
Stuart Hogg	Fullback	24 June 1992 (aged 26)	65	(Scotland) Glasgow Warriors
Blair Kinghorn	Fullback	18 January 1997 (aged 22)	7	(Scotland) Edinburgh

=== Call-ups ===
On 21 January, Luke Crosbie, Alex Dunbar, Rob Harley and Matt Smith being called into the squad as injury cover.

On 28 January, Rory Hughes, Stafford McDowall and Henry Pyrgos being called into the squad as injury cover.

On 4 February, Fraser Brown and Murray McCallum called into the squad as replacements.

On 18 February, Duncan Weir, Dougie Fife, James Johnstone, Magnus Bradbury, Zander Fagerson and George Turner were called up to the squad.

On 4 March, Matt Fagerson, Byron McGuigan and Gordon Reid were called up to the squad.

On 11 March, Ruaridh Jackson and Kyle Steyn were called up to the squad as injury cover.

Player	Position	Date of birth (age)	Caps	Club/province
Fraser Brown	Hooker	20 June 1989 (aged 29)	38	(Scotland) Glasgow Warriors
George Turner	Hooker	8 October 1992 (aged 26)	5	(Scotland) Glasgow Warriors
Zander Fagerson	Prop	19 January 1996 (aged 23)	18	(Scotland) Glasgow Warriors
Murray McCallum	Prop	16 March 1996 (aged 22)	3	(Scotland) Edinburgh
Gordon Reid	Prop	4 March 1987 (aged 32)	33	(England) London Irish
Magnus Bradbury	Back row	23 August 1995 (aged 23)	4	(Scotland) Edinburgh
Luke Crosbie	Back row	22 April 1997 (aged 21)	0	(Scotland) Edinburgh
Matt Fagerson	Back row	16 July 1998 (aged 20)	3	(Scotland) Glasgow Warriors
Rob Harley	Back row	26 May 1990 (aged 28)	20	(Scotland) Glasgow Warriors
Matt Smith	Back row	5 October 1996 (aged 22)	0	(Scotland) Glasgow Warriors
Henry Pyrgos	Scrum-half	9 July 1989 (aged 29)	27	(Scotland) Edinburgh
Duncan Weir	Fly-half	10 May 1991 (aged 27)	27	(England) Worcester Warriors
Alex Dunbar	Centre	23 April 1990 (aged 28)	31	(Scotland) Glasgow Warriors
James Johnstone	Centre	17 April 1990 (aged 28)	0	(Scotland) Edinburgh
Stafford McDowall	Centre	24 February 1998 (aged 20)	0	(Scotland) Glasgow Warriors
Dougie Fife	Wing	8 August 1990 (aged 28)	8	(Scotland) Edinburgh
Rory Hughes	Wing	4 March 1993 (aged 25)	4	(Scotland) Glasgow Warriors
Byron McGuigan	Wing	23 October 1986 (aged 32)	6	(England) Sale Sharks
Kyle Steyn	Wing	21 January 1994 (aged 25)	0	(Scotland) Glasgow Warriors
Ruaridh Jackson	Fullback	12 February 1988 (aged 31)	33	(Scotland) Glasgow Warriors

== Wales ==
On 15 January, Warren Gatland named a 39-man squad for the 2019 Six Nations Championship.

Head coach: (New Zealand) Warren Gatland

Player	Position	Date of birth (age)	Caps	Club/province
Elliot Dee	Hooker	7 March 1994 (aged 24)	12	(Wales) Dragons
Ryan Elias	Hooker	7 January 1995 (aged 24)	6	(Wales) Scarlets
Ken Owens	Hooker	3 January 1987 (aged 32)	59	(Wales) Scarlets
Leon Brown	Prop	26 October 1996 (aged 22)	5	(Wales) Dragons
Rob Evans	Prop	14 April 1992 (aged 26)	30	(Wales) Scarlets
Tomas Francis	Prop	27 April 1992 (aged 26)	35	(England) Exeter Chiefs
Wyn Jones	Prop	26 February 1992 (aged 26)	10	(Wales) Scarlets
Samson Lee	Prop	30 November 1992 (aged 26)	38	(Wales) Scarlets
Dillon Lewis	Prop	4 January 1996 (aged 23)	7	(Wales) Cardiff Blues
Nicky Smith	Prop	7 April 1994 (aged 24)	23	(Wales) Ospreys
Jake Ball	Lock	27 June 1991 (aged 27)	29	(Wales) Scarlets
Adam Beard	Lock	7 January 1996 (aged 23)	7	(Wales) Ospreys
Seb Davies	Lock	17 May 1996 (aged 22)	7	(Wales) Cardiff Blues
Cory Hill	Lock	10 February 1992 (aged 26)	21	(Wales) Dragons
Alun Wyn Jones (c)	Lock	19 September 1985 (aged 33)	119	(Wales) Ospreys
Ross Moriarty	Back row	18 April 1994 (aged 24)	25	(Wales) Dragons
Josh Navidi	Back row	30 December 1990 (aged 28)	11	(Wales) Cardiff Blues
Justin Tipuric	Back row	6 August 1989 (aged 29)	59	(Wales) Ospreys
Josh Turnbull	Back row	12 March 1988 (aged 30)	10	(Wales) Cardiff Blues
Aaron Wainwright	Back row	25 September 1997 (aged 21)	2	(Wales) Dragons
Thomas Young	Back row	18 May 1992 (aged 26)	2	(England) Wasps
Aled Davies	Scrum-half	19 July 1992 (aged 26)	12	(Wales) Ospreys
Gareth Davies	Scrum-half	18 August 1990 (aged 28)	35	(Wales) Scarlets
Tomos Williams	Scrum-half	1 January 1995 (aged 24)	5	(Wales) Cardiff Blues
Gareth Anscombe	Fly-half	10 May 1991 (aged 27)	20	(Wales) Cardiff Blues
Dan Biggar	Fly-half	16 October 1989 (aged 29)	64	(England) Northampton Saints
Jarrod Evans	Fly-half	25 July 1996 (aged 22)	1	(Wales) Cardiff Blues
Rhys Patchell	Fly-half	17 May 1993 (aged 25)	11	(Wales) Scarlets
Jonathan Davies	Centre	5 April 1988 (aged 30)	67	(Wales) Scarlets
Hadleigh Parkes	Centre	5 October 1987 (aged 31)	10	(Wales) Scarlets
Owen Watkin	Centre	12 October 1996 (aged 22)	7	(Wales) Ospreys
Scott Williams	Centre	10 October 1990 (aged 28)	57	(Wales) Ospreys
Josh Adams	Wing	21 April 1995 (aged 23)	5	(England) Worcester Warriors
Hallam Amos	Wing	24 September 1994 (aged 24)	18	(Wales) Dragons
Steff Evans	Wing	1 September 1994 (aged 24)	12	(Wales) Scarlets
Jonah Holmes	Wing	24 July 1992 (aged 26)	1	(England) Leicester Tigers
George North	Wing	13 April 1992 (aged 26)	78	(Wales) Ospreys
Leigh Halfpenny	Fullback	22 December 1988 (aged 30)	80	(Wales) Scarlets
Liam Williams	Fullback	9 April 1991 (aged 27)	50	(England) Saracens
