= 2019 Six Nations Championship =

Rugby union competition in Europe

- Date: 1 February – 16 March 2019
- Countries: England; France; Ireland; Italy; Scotland; Wales

Tournament statistics
- Champions: Wales (27th title)
- Grand Slam: Wales (12th title)
- Triple Crown: Wales (21st title)
- Matches played: 15
- Attendance: 975,125 (65,008 per match)
- Tries scored: 84 (5.6 per match)
- Top point scorer: (England) Owen Farrell (59)
- Top try scorer: (England) Jonny May (6)
- Player of the tournament: (Wales) Alun Wyn Jones
- Official website: sixnationsrugby.com

The 2019 Six Nations Championship (known as the Guinness Six Nations for sponsorship reasons) was the 20th Six Nations Championship, the annual rugby union competition contested by the national teams of England, France, Ireland, Italy, Scotland, and Wales, and the 125th edition of the competition (including all the tournament's previous versions as the Home Nations Championship and Five Nations Championship).

Wales won the championship for the first time since 2013, beating defending champions Ireland at the Millennium Stadium on the final day to claim their first Grand Slam since 2012.

== Participants ==
Nation	Stadium			Head coach	Captain
Nation	Home stadium	Capacity	Location	Head coach	Captain
England	Twickenham Stadium	82,000	London	(Australia) Eddie Jones	Owen Farrell
France	Stade de France	81,338	Saint-Denis	(France) Jacques Brunel	Guilhem Guirado
Ireland	Aviva Stadium	51,700	Dublin	(New Zealand) Joe Schmidt	Rory Best
Italy	Stadio Olimpico	73,261	Rome	(Ireland) Conor O'Shea	Sergio Parisse
Scotland	Murrayfield Stadium	67,144	Edinburgh	(Scotland) Gregor Townsend	Greig Laidlaw
Wales	Millennium Stadium	73,931	Cardiff	(New Zealand) Warren Gatland	Alun Wyn Jones

== Table ==
Pos	Team	Pld	W	D	L	PF	PA	PD	TF	TA	GS	TB	LB	Pts
1	Wales	5	5	0	0	114	65	+49	10	7	3	0	0	23
2	England	5	3	1	1	184	101	+83	24	13	0	4	0	18
3	Ireland	5	3	0	2	101	100	+1	14	10	0	2	0	14
4	France	5	2	0	3	93	118	−25	12	15	0	1	1	10
5	Scotland	5	1	1	3	105	125	−20	14	17	0	2	1	9
6	Italy	5	0	0	5	79	167	−88	10	22	0	0	0	0

Source: ESPN

Table ranking rules

- Four points were awarded for a win.
- Two points were awarded for a draw.
- A bonus point was awarded to a team that scored four or more tries in a match or loses a match by seven points or fewer. If a team scored four tries in a match and loses by seven points or fewer, they were awarded both bonus points.
- Three bonus points were awarded to a team that wins all five of their matches (a Grand Slam). This ensured that a Grand Slam winning team would top the table with at least 23 points – a team could lose a match but still win two bonus points and win the other four matches with four try bonus points for a maximum of 22 points.
- Tiebreakers
  - If two or more teams were tied on match points, the team with the better points difference (points scored less points conceded) were ranked higher.
  - If the above tiebreaker failed to separate tied teams, the team that scored the higher number of total tries in their matches were ranked higher.
  - If two or more teams remained tied for first place at the end of the championship after applying the above tiebreakers, the title would be shared between them.

== Fixtures ==
The fixtures were announced on 16 May 2017. The first game of the championship was a Friday night game between France and Wales.

=== Round 1 ===
1 February 2019
21:00 CET (UTC+1)

(1 BP) France	19–24	Wales
Try: Picamoles 6' m Huget 23' m Pen: Lopez (2/3) 34', 78; Drop: Lopez (1/2) 40'	Report; Match data	Try: T. Williams 47' c North (2) 52' c, 72' c Con: Anscombe (2/2) 47', 53'; Biggar (1/1) 73'; Pen: Biggar (1/1) 63'

Stade de France, Saint-Denis
Attendance: 60,000
Referee: Wayne Barnes (England)

FB	15	Maxime Médard
RW	14	Damian Penaud	(substituted off) 63'
OC	13	Romain Ntamack
IC	12	Wesley Fofana	(substituted off) 67'
LW	11	Yoann Huget
FH	10	Camille Lopez
SH	9	Morgan Parra	(substituted off) 58'
N8	8	Louis Picamoles	(substituted off) 71'
OF	7	Arthur Iturria
BF	6	Wenceslas Lauret
RL	5	Paul Willemse	(substituted off) 58'
LL	4	Sébastien Vahaamahina
TP	3	Uini Atonio	(substituted off) 48'
HK	2	Guilhem Guirado (c)	(substituted off) 58'
LP	1	Jefferson Poirot	(substituted off) 61'
Replacements:
HK	16	Julien Marchand	(substituted on) 58'
PR	17	Dany Priso	(substituted on) 61'
PR	18	Demba Bamba	(substituted on) 48'
LK	19	Félix Lambey	(substituted on) 58'
N8	20	Grégory Alldritt	(substituted on) 71'
SH	21	Baptiste Serin	(substituted on) 58'
CE	22	Gaël Fickou	(substituted on) 63'
CE	23	Geoffrey Doumayrou	(substituted on) 67'
Coach:
Jacques Brunel

FB	15	Liam Williams		(substituted off) 67'
RW	14	George North
OC	13	Jonathan Davies
IC	12	Hadleigh Parkes	(substituted off) 77'
LW	11	Josh Adams
FH	10	Gareth Anscombe	(substituted off) 53'	(substituted on) 67'
SH	9	Tomos Williams	(substituted off) 53'
N8	8	Ross Moriarty
OF	7	Justin Tipuric
BF	6	Josh Navidi	(substituted off) 79'
RL	5	Alun Wyn Jones (c)
LL	4	Adam Beard	(substituted off) 48'
TP	3	Tomas Francis	(substituted off) 56'
HK	2	Ken Owens	(substituted off) 73'
LP	1	Rob Evans	(substituted off) 73'
Replacements:
HK	16	Elliot Dee	(substituted on) 73'
PR	17	Wyn Jones	(substituted on) 73'
PR	18	Samson Lee	(substituted on) 56'
LK	19	Cory Hill	(substituted on) 48'
FL	20	Aaron Wainwright	(substituted on) 79'
SH	21	Gareth Davies	(substituted on) 53'
FH	22	Dan Biggar	(substituted on) 53'
CE	23	Owen Watkin	(substituted on) 77'
Coach:
Warren Gatland

Man of the Match:
George North (Wales)

Touch judges:
Andrew Brace (Ireland)
Brendon Pickerill (New Zealand)
Television match official:
Rowan Kitt (England)

Notes:

- Paul Willemse, Grégory Alldritt and Romain Ntamack (all France) made their international debuts.
- After trailing 16–0 at half time, Wales' win was the biggest comeback in Six Nations history as well as their biggest in any match.

2 February 2019
14:15 GMT (UTC+0)

(1 BP) Scotland	33–20	Italy
Try: Kinghorn (3) 12' m, 21' c, 54' c Hogg 47' c Harris 62' c Con: Laidlaw (3/4) 23', 49', 55'; Russell (1/1) 63'	Report; Match data	Try: Palazzani 71' c Padovani 75' m Esposito 78' m Con: Allan (1/1) 71'; Pen: Allan (1/1) 10'

Murrayfield Stadium, Edinburgh
Attendance: 67,144
Referee: Luke Pearce (England)

FB	15	Stuart Hogg
RW	14	Tommy Seymour
OC	13	Huw Jones		(substituted off) 58'
IC	12	Sam Johnson
LW	11	Blair Kinghorn
FH	10	Finn Russell		(substituted off) 76'
SH	9	Greig Laidlaw (c)		(substituted off) 58'
N8	8	Ryan Wilson		(substituted off) 72'
OF	7	Jamie Ritchie
BF	6	Sam Skinner		(substituted off) 13'
RL	5	Grant Gilchrist
LL	4	Ben Toolis
TP	3	WP Nel		(substituted off) 50'
HK	2	Stuart McInally		(substituted off) 63'
LP	1	Allan Dell		(substituted off) 58'
Replacements:
HK	16	Jake Kerr		(substituted on) 63'
PR	17	Jamie Bhatti		(substituted on) 58'
PR	18	Simon Berghan	(yellow card) 71'	(substituted on) 50'
FL	19	Gary Graham		(substituted on) 72'
N8	20	Josh Strauss		(substituted on) 13'
SH	21	Ali Price		(substituted on) 58'
FH	22	Adam Hastings		(substituted on) 76'
CE	23	Chris Harris		(substituted on) 58'
Coach:
Gregor Townsend

FB	15	Jayden Hayward
RW	14	Angelo Esposito
OC	13	Luca Morisi	(substituted off) 79'
IC	12	Tommaso Castello	(substituted off) 49'
LW	11	Michele Campagnaro
FH	10	Tommaso Allan	27' to 36'		(substituted off) 72'
SH	9	Guglielmo Palazzani
N8	8	Sergio Parisse (c)
OF	7	Braam Steyn
BF	6	Sebastian Negri	(substituted off) 59'
RL	5	Dean Budd	(substituted off) 52'
LL	4	Dave Sisi
TP	3	Simone Ferrari	(substituted off) 63'
HK	2	Leonardo Ghiraldini	(substituted off) 59'
LP	1	Andrea Lovotti	(substituted off) 52'
Replacements:
HK	16	Luca Bigi	(substituted on) 59'
PR	17	Cherif Traorè	(substituted on) 52'
PR	18	Tiziano Pasquali	(substituted on) 63'
LK	19	Federico Ruzza	(substituted on) 52'
FL	20	Jimmy Tuivaiti	(substituted on) 59'
CE	21	Tommaso Benvenuti	(substituted on) 79'
FH	22	Ian McKinley	(substituted on) 27'	(substituted off) 36'	(substituted on) 72'
FB	23	Edoardo Padovani	(substituted on) 49'
Coach:
Conor O'Shea

Man of the Match:
Blair Kinghorn (Scotland)

Touch judges:
Mathieu Raynal (France)
Shuhei Kubo (Japan)
Television match official:
Simon McDowell (Ireland)

Notes:

- Sam Johnson, Jake Kerr, Gary Graham (all Scotland) and Dave Sisi (Italy) made their international debuts.
- Leonardo Ghiraldini earned his 100th cap for Italy.
- This was Sergio Parisse's 66th Six Nations appearance, the most by any player in the history of the competition.
- Blair Kinghorn's hat-trick was the first by a Scottish player in the Five/Six Nations since Iwan Tukalo managed the feat against Ireland in 1989.
- This was Scotland's fourth consecutive Six Nations win over Italy, the first time they have won four in a row against any team in the Six nations.

2 February 2019
16:45 GMT (UTC+0)

Ireland	20–32	England (1 BP)
Try: Healy 25' c Cooney 80' c Con: Sexton (2/2) 26', 80'; Pen: Sexton (2/2) 11', 55'	Report; Match data	Try: May 2' c Daly 30' c Slade (2) 66' m, 76' c Con: Farrell (3/4) 3', 31', 77'; Pen: Farrell (2/3) 40', 70'

Aviva Stadium, Dublin
Attendance: 51,000
Referee: Jérôme Garcès (France)

FB	15	Robbie Henshaw
RW	14	Keith Earls	(substituted off) 41'
OC	13	Garry Ringrose	(substituted off) 73'
IC	12	Bundee Aki
LW	11	Jacob Stockdale
FH	10	Johnny Sexton
SH	9	Conor Murray	(substituted off) 77'
N8	8	CJ Stander	(substituted off) 65'
OF	7	Josh van der Flier
BF	6	Peter O'Mahony
RL	5	James Ryan
LL	4	Devin Toner	(substituted off) 57'
TP	3	Tadhg Furlong	(substituted off) 62'
HK	2	Rory Best (c)	(substituted off) 67'
LP	1	Cian Healy	(substituted off) 62'
Replacements:
HK	16	Seán Cronin	(substituted on) 67'
PR	17	Dave Kilcoyne	(substituted on) 62'
PR	18	Andrew Porter	(substituted on) 62'
LK	19	Quinn Roux	(substituted on) 57'
FL	20	Seán O'Brien	(substituted on) 65'
SH	21	John Cooney	(substituted on) 77'
FH	22	Joey Carbery	(substituted on) 73'
FB	23	Jordan Larmour	(substituted on) 41'
Coach:
Joe Schmidt

FB	15	Elliot Daly
RW	14	Jack Nowell		(substituted off) 74'
OC	13	Henry Slade
IC	12	Manu Tuilagi		(substituted off) 77'
LW	11	Jonny May
FH	10	Owen Farrell (c)
SH	9	Ben Youngs
N8	8	Billy Vunipola
OF	7	Tom Curry	(yellow card) 13'
BF	6	Mark Wilson
RL	5	George Kruis		(substituted off) 52'
LL	4	Maro Itoje		(substituted off) 54'
TP	3	Kyle Sinckler		(substituted off) 65'
HK	2	Jamie George		(substituted off) 77'
LP	1	Mako Vunipola		(substituted off) 77'
Replacements:
HK	16	Luke Cowan-Dickie		(substituted on) 77'
PR	17	Ellis Genge		(substituted on) 77'
PR	18	Harry Williams		(substituted on) 65'
LK	19	Courtney Lawes		(substituted on) 52'
N8	20	Nathan Hughes		(substituted on) 54'
SH	21	Dan Robson
FH	22	George Ford		(substituted on) 77'
WG	23	Chris Ashton		(substituted on) 74'
Coach:
Eddie Jones

Man of the Match:
Mako Vunipola (England)

Touch judges:
Romain Poite (France)
Alexandre Ruiz (France)
Television match official:
Glenn Newman (New Zealand)

Notes:

- Jonny May's try after less than 90 seconds was England's first at the Aviva Stadium since Steve Thompson scored in 2011.
- This was Ireland's first home defeat since they lost to New Zealand during the 2016 end-of-year rugby union internationals, ending a 12-match home winning streak.
- This was Ireland's first home loss in the Six Nations with Joe Schmidt as coach.
- This was England's first win against Ireland at the Aviva Stadium since their 12–6 victory in 2013, which was also Ireland's last Six Nations loss there (a run of 14 games unbeaten).
- England won the Millennium Trophy for the first time since 2016.

=== Round 2 ===
9 February 2019
14:15 GMT (UTC+0)

Scotland	13–22	Ireland
Try: Johnson 29' c Con: Laidlaw (1/1) 30'; Pen: Laidlaw (2/2) 7', 62'	Report; Match data	Try: Murray 10' m Stockdale 17' c Earls 56' c Con: Murray (1/1) 17'; Carbery (1/1) 57'; Pen: Carbery (1/1) 69'

Murrayfield Stadium, Edinburgh
Attendance: 67,144
Referee: Romain Poite (France)

FB	15	Stuart Hogg	(substituted off) 17'
RW	14	Tommy Seymour
OC	13	Huw Jones
IC	12	Sam Johnson	(substituted off) 64'
LW	11	Sean Maitland
FH	10	Finn Russell
SH	9	Greig Laidlaw (c)	(substituted off) 69'
N8	8	Josh Strauss
OF	7	Jamie Ritchie	35' to 41'
BF	6	Ryan Wilson		(substituted off) 41'
RL	5	Jonny Gray
LL	4	Grant Gilchrist
TP	3	Simon Berghan	(substituted off) 69'
HK	2	Stuart McInally	(substituted off) 64'
LP	1	Allan Dell	(substituted off) 69'
Replacements:
HK	16	Fraser Brown	(substituted on) 64'
PR	17	Jamie Bhatti	(substituted on) 69'
PR	18	D'Arcy Rae	(substituted on) 69'
LK	19	Ben Toolis
FL	20	Rob Harley	(substituted on) 35'
SH	21	Ali Price	(substituted on) 69'
CE	22	Peter Horne	(substituted on) 64'
WG	23	Blair Kinghorn	(substituted on) 17'
Coach:
Gregor Townsend

FB	15	Rob Kearney
RW	14	Keith Earls
OC	13	Chris Farrell
IC	12	Bundee Aki
LW	11	Jacob Stockdale	(substituted off) 72'
FH	10	Johnny Sexton	(substituted off) 24'
SH	9	Conor Murray	(substituted off) 77'
N8	8	Jack Conan
OF	7	Seán O'Brien	(substituted off) 64'
BF	6	Peter O'Mahony
RL	5	Quinn Roux	(substituted off) 68'
LL	4	James Ryan
TP	3	Tadhg Furlong	(substituted off) 68'
HK	2	Rory Best (c)	(substituted off) 72'
LP	1	Cian Healy	(substituted off) 57'
Replacements:
HK	16	Seán Cronin	(substituted on) 72'
PR	17	Dave Kilcoyne	(substituted on) 57'
PR	18	Andrew Porter	(substituted on) 68'
LK	19	Ultan Dillane	(substituted on) 68'
FL	20	Josh van der Flier	(substituted on) 64'
SH	21	John Cooney	(substituted on) 77'
FH	22	Joey Carbery	(substituted on) 24'
FB	23	Jordan Larmour	(substituted on) 72'
Coach:
Joe Schmidt

Man of the Match:
Peter O'Mahony (Ireland)

Touch judges:
Pascal Gaüzère (France)
Alexandre Ruiz (France)
Television match official:
Rowan Kitt (England)

Notes:

- D'Arcy Rae (Scotland) made his international debut.
- This was Scotland's first loss at Murrayfield in the Six Nations since the opening round of the 2016 tournament, bringing an end to a run of seven consecutive home wins in the championship, their longest run of home wins in the Six Nations era.
- The nine-point margin was Scotland's biggest defeat in any international at Murrayfield since Ireland won 40–10 on the final day of the 2015 Six Nations tournament.
- Ireland retained the Centenary Quaich.

9 February 2019
17:45 CET (UTC+1)

Italy	15–26	Wales
Try: Steyn 34' c Padovani 75' m Con: Allan (1/2) 36'; Pen: Allan (1/2) 44'	Report; Match data	Try: Adams 54' c Watkin 70' c Con: Biggar (1/1) 55'; Anscombe (1/1) 71'; Pen: Biggar (4/4) 2', 15', 19', 30'

Stadio Olimpico, Rome
Attendance: 38,700
Referee: Mathieu Raynal (France)

FB	15	Jayden Hayward
RW	14	Edoardo Padovani
OC	13	Michele Campagnaro
IC	12	Luca Morisi
LW	11	Angelo Esposito
FH	10	Tommaso Allan	48' to 55'
SH	9	Guglielmo Palazzani	(substituted off) 60'
N8	8	Sergio Parisse (c)
OF	7	Braam Steyn
BF	6	Sebastian Negri	(substituted off) 57'
RL	5	Dean Budd	(substituted off) 52'
LL	4	Dave Sisi
TP	3	Simone Ferrari	(substituted off) 60'
HK	2	Leonardo Ghiraldini	(substituted off) 60'
LP	1	Nicola Quaglio	(substituted off) 51'
Replacements:
HK	16	Luca Bigi	(substituted on) 60'
PR	17	Cherif Traorè	(substituted on) 51'
PR	18	Tiziano Pasquali	(substituted on) 60'
LK	19	Federico Ruzza	(substituted on) 52'
FL	20	Marco Barbini	(substituted on) 57'
SH	21	Edoardo Gori	(substituted on) 60'
FH	22	Ian McKinley	(substituted on) 48'	(substituted off) 55'
CE	23	Tommaso Benvenuti
Coach:
Conor O'Shea

FB	15	Liam Williams	(substituted off) 67'
RW	14	Jonah Holmes
OC	13	Jonathan Davies (c)
IC	12	Owen Watkin
LW	11	Josh Adams
FH	10	Dan Biggar	(substituted off) 55'
SH	9	Aled Davies	(substituted off) 63'
N8	8	Josh Navidi	(substituted off) 67'
OF	7	Thomas Young
BF	6	Aaron Wainwright
RL	5	Adam Beard
LL	4	Jake Ball	(substituted off) 51'
TP	3	Samson Lee	(substituted off) 51'
HK	2	Elliot Dee	(substituted off) 67'
LP	1	Nicky Smith	(substituted off) 63'
Replacements:
HK	16	Ryan Elias	(substituted on) 67'
PR	17	Wyn Jones	(substituted on) 63'
PR	18	Dillon Lewis	(substituted on) 51'
LK	19	Alun Wyn Jones	(substituted on) 51'
N8	20	Ross Moriarty	(substituted on) 67'
SH	21	Gareth Davies	(substituted on) 63'
FH	22	Gareth Anscombe	(substituted on) 55'
WG	23	Hallam Amos	(substituted on) 67'
Coach:
Warren Gatland

Man of the Match:
Josh Navidi (Wales)

Touch judges:
Wayne Barnes (England)
Shuhei Kubo (Japan)
Television match official:
David Grashoff (England)

Notes:

- Jonathan Davies captained Wales for the first time.
- Alun Wyn Jones made his 50th Six Nations appearance, making him only the fourth Wales player to reach that mark.
- This was Wales' 11th consecutive win in international rugby, equalling their all-time record, set between 1907 and 1910.

10 February 2019
15:00 GMT (UTC+0)

(1 BP) England	44–8	France
Try: May (3) 2' m, 24' m, 29' c Slade 40' c Penalty try 49'; Farrell 55' c Con: Farrell (3/5) 31', 40', 56'; Pen: Farrell (2/2) 7', 13'	Report; Match data	Try: Penaud 35' m Pen: Parra (1/1) 10'

Twickenham Stadium, London
Attendance: 82,000
Referee: Nigel Owens (Wales)

FB	15	Elliot Daly
RW	14	Chris Ashton	(substituted off) 52'
OC	13	Henry Slade
IC	12	Manu Tuilagi	(substituted off) 62'
LW	11	Jonny May
FH	10	Owen Farrell (c)
SH	9	Ben Youngs	(substituted off) 70'
N8	8	Billy Vunipola			(substituted off) 65'
OF	7	Tom Curry	47' to 52'
BF	6	Mark Wilson
RL	5	George Kruis	(substituted off) 47'
LL	4	Courtney Lawes
TP	3	Kyle Sinckler	(substituted off) 57'
HK	2	Jamie George	(substituted off) 62'
LP	1	Mako Vunipola	(substituted off) 44'
Replacements:
HK	16	Luke Cowan-Dickie	(substituted on) 62'
PR	17	Ben Moon	(substituted on) 44'
PR	18	Dan Cole	(substituted on) 57'
LK	19	Joe Launchbury	(substituted on) 47'
N8	20	Nathan Hughes	(substituted on) 47'	(substituted off) 52'	(substituted on) 65'
SH	21	Dan Robson	(substituted on) 70'
FH	22	George Ford	(substituted on) 62'
WG	23	Jack Nowell	(substituted on) 52'
Coach:
Eddie Jones

FB	15	Yoann Huget		(substituted off) 41'
RW	14	Damian Penaud		47' to 57'
OC	13	Mathieu Bastareaud
IC	12	Geoffrey Doumayrou
LW	11	Gaël Fickou	(yellow card) 50'
FH	10	Camille Lopez			(substituted off) 57'
SH	9	Morgan Parra		(substituted off) 47'
N8	8	Louis Picamoles
OF	7	Arthur Iturria
BF	6	Yacouba Camara
RL	5	Félix Lambey		(substituted off) 70'
LL	4	Sébastien Vahaamahina		(substituted off) 57'
TP	3	Demba Bamba		(substituted off) 57'
HK	2	Guilhem Guirado (c)		(substituted off) 76'
LP	1	Jefferson Poirot		(substituted off) 65'	(substituted on) 70'
Replacements:
HK	16	Pierre Bourgarit		(substituted on) 76'
PR	17	Dany Priso		(substituted on) 65'	(substituted off) 70'
PR	18	Dorian Aldegheri		(substituted on) 57'
LK	19	Paul Willemse		(substituted on) 57'
N8	20	Grégory Alldritt		(substituted on) 70'
SH	21	Antoine Dupont		(substituted on) 47'
FH	22	Romain Ntamack		(substituted on) 47'
FB	23	Thomas Ramos		(substituted on) 41'
Coach:
Jacques Brunel

Man of the Match:
Jonny May (England)

Touch judges:
Andrew Brace (Ireland)
Brendon Pickerill (New Zealand)
Television match official:
Glenn Newman (New Zealand)

Notes:

- Dan Robson (England), Dorian Aldegheri and Thomas Ramos (both France) made their international debuts.
- Jonny May's hat-trick was the first by an England player against France since Jake Jacob in 1924.
- This was France's biggest defeat to England since they lost 37–0 in 1911, as well as their biggest loss to any team in the Five/Six Nations since that date.

=== Round 3 ===
23 February 2019
15:15 CET (UTC+1)

(1 BP) France	27–10	Scotland
Try: Ntamack 13' c Huget 41' m Alldritt (2) 75' m, 80+8' c Con: Ramos (1/2) 15'; Serin (1/2) 80+9'; Pen: Ramos (1/2) 18'	Report; Match data	Try: Price 78' c Con: Hastings 78'; Pen: Laidlaw (1/2) 26'

Stade de France, Saint-Denis
Attendance: 80,000
Referee: Nic Berry (Australia)

FB	15	Thomas Ramos		(substituted off) 70'
RW	14	Damian Penaud
OC	13	Mathieu Bastareaud
IC	12	Gaël Fickou
LW	11	Yoann Huget	(yellow card) 28'
FH	10	Romain Ntamack		(substituted off) 76'
SH	9	Antoine Dupont		(substituted off) 70'
N8	8	Louis Picamoles		(substituted off) 70'
OF	7	Arthur Iturria
BF	6	Wenceslas Lauret
RL	5	Félix Lambey		(substituted off) 65'
LL	4	Sébastien Vahaamahina
TP	3	Demba Bamba		(substituted off) 70'
HK	2	Guilhem Guirado (c)		28' to 37'		(substituted off) 70'
LP	1	Jefferson Poirot		(substituted off) 70'
Replacements:
HK	16	Camille Chat		(substituted on) 28'	(substituted off) 37'	(substituted on) 70'
PR	17	Étienne Falgoux		(substituted on) 70'
PR	18	Dorian Aldegheri		(substituted on) 70'
LK	19	Paul Willemse		(substituted on) 65'
N8	20	Grégory Alldritt		(substituted on) 70'
SH	21	Baptiste Serin		(substituted on) 70'
FH	22	Anthony Belleau		(substituted on) 76'
FB	23	Maxime Médard		(substituted on) 70'
Coach:
Jacques Brunel

FB	15	Blair Kinghorn
RW	14	Tommy Seymour
OC	13	Nick Grigg
IC	12	Sam Johnson		(substituted off) 53'
LW	11	Sean Maitland	(substituted off) 65'
FH	10	Peter Horne	44' to 53'
SH	9	Greig Laidlaw (c)	(substituted off) 65'
N8	8	Josh Strauss	(substituted off) 65'
OF	7	Jamie Ritchie
BF	6	Magnus Bradbury
RL	5	Jonny Gray	(substituted off) 55'
LL	4	Grant Gilchrist
TP	3	Simon Berghan	(substituted off) 65'
HK	2	Stuart McInally	(substituted off) 65'
LP	1	Allan Dell	(substituted off) 65'
Replacements:
HK	16	Fraser Brown	(substituted on) 65'
PR	17	Alex Allan	(substituted on) 65'
PR	18	Zander Fagerson	(substituted on) 65'
LK	19	Ben Toolis	(substituted on) 55'
FL	20	Gary Graham	(substituted on) 65'
SH	21	Ali Price	(substituted on) 65'
FH	22	Adam Hastings	(substituted on) 44'
WG	23	Darcy Graham	(substituted on) 65'
Coach:
Gregor Townsend

Man of the Match:
Demba Bamba (France)

Touch judges:
Nigel Owens (Wales)
Andrew Brace (Ireland)
Television match official:
Rowan Kitt (England)

Notes:

- Étienne Falgoux (France) made his international debut.
- France won the Auld Alliance Trophy for the first time.`

23 February 2019
16:45 GMT (UTC+0)

Wales	21–13	England
Try: Hill 68' c Adams 78' m Con: Biggar (1/2) 69'; Pen: Anscombe (3/3) 24', 52', 57'	Report; Match data	Try: Curry 27' c Con: Farrell (1/1) 27'; Pen: Farrell (2/2) 18', 63'

Millennium Stadium, Cardiff
Attendance: 73,931
Referee: Jaco Peyper (South Africa)

FB	15	Liam Williams
RW	14	George North
OC	13	Jonathan Davies
IC	12	Hadleigh Parkes	(substituted off) 80'
LW	11	Josh Adams
FH	10	Gareth Anscombe	(substituted off) 61'
SH	9	Gareth Davies	(substituted off) 77'
N8	8	Ross Moriarty	(substituted off) 77'
OF	7	Justin Tipuric
BF	6	Josh Navidi
RL	5	Alun Wyn Jones (c)
LL	4	Cory Hill	(substituted off) 71'
TP	3	Tomas Francis	(substituted off) 61'
HK	2	Ken Owens	(substituted off) 77'
LP	1	Rob Evans	(substituted off) 61'
Replacements:
HK	16	Elliot Dee	(substituted on) 77'
PR	17	Nicky Smith	(substituted on) 61'
PR	18	Dillon Lewis	(substituted on) 61'
LK	19	Adam Beard	(substituted on) 71'
FL	20	Aaron Wainwright	(substituted on) 77'
SH	21	Aled Davies	(substituted on) 77'
FH	22	Dan Biggar	(substituted on) 61'
CE	23	Owen Watkin	(substituted on) 80'
Coach:
Warren Gatland

FB	15	Elliot Daly
RW	14	Jack Nowell
OC	13	Henry Slade
IC	12	Manu Tuilagi
LW	11	Jonny May	(substituted off) 70'
FH	10	Owen Farrell (c)
SH	9	Ben Youngs
N8	8	Billy Vunipola
OF	7	Tom Curry
BF	6	Mark Wilson
RL	5	George Kruis	(substituted off) 64'
LL	4	Courtney Lawes	(substituted off) 77'
TP	3	Kyle Sinckler	(substituted off) 57'
HK	2	Jamie George
LP	1	Ben Moon	(substituted off) 77'
Replacements:
HK	16	Luke Cowan-Dickie
PR	17	Ellis Genge	(substituted on) 77'
PR	18	Harry Williams	(substituted on) 57'
LK	19	Joe Launchbury	(substituted on) 64'
FL	20	Brad Shields	(substituted on) 77'
SH	21	Dan Robson
FH	22	George Ford
WG	23	Joe Cokanasiga	(substituted on) 70'
Coach:
Eddie Jones

Man of the Match:
Liam Williams (Wales)

Touch judges:
Jérôme Garcès (France)
Alexandre Ruiz (France)
Television match official:
Simon McDowell (Ireland)

Notes:

- This was Wales' 12th consecutive win, their best run, beating the previous record of 11, set between 1907 and 1910.
- This was Wales' first victory against England since winning 28–25 at the 2015 Rugby World Cup, and their first in the Six Nations since a 30–3 win in 2013.

24 February 2019
16:00 CET (UTC+1)

Italy	16–26	Ireland (1 BP)
Try: Padovani 33' m Morisi 39' m Pen: Allan (2/3) 20', 26'	Report; Match data	Try: Roux 11' c Stockdale 21' m Earls 51' c Murray 67' c Con: Sexton (1/2) 12'; Murray (2/2) 52', 68'

Stadio Olimpico, Rome
Attendance: 49,720
Referee: Glen Jackson (New Zealand)

FB	15	Jayden Hayward
RW	14	Edoardo Padovani
OC	13	Michele Campagnaro	(substituted off) 72'
IC	12	Luca Morisi
LW	11	Angelo Esposito
FH	10	Tommaso Allan	(substituted off) 74'
SH	9	Tito Tebaldi
N8	8	Braam Steyn
OF	7	Maxime Mbanda	(substituted off) 43'
BF	6	Jimmy Tuivaiti	(substituted off) 52'
RL	5	Dean Budd
LL	4	Federico Ruzza
TP	3	Simone Ferrari	(substituted off) 52'
HK	2	Leonardo Ghiraldini (c)
LP	1	Andrea Lovotti	(substituted off) 61'
Replacements:
HK	16	Luca Bigi
PR	17	Cherif Traorè	(substituted on) 61'
PR	18	Tiziano Pasquali	(substituted on) 52'
LK	19	David Sisi	(substituted on) 52'
FL	20	Alessandro Zanni	(substituted on) 43'
SH	21	Guglielmo Palazzani
FH	22	Ian McKinley	(substituted on) 74'
CE	23	Tommaso Castello	(substituted on) 72'
Coach:
Conor O'Shea

FB	15	Rob Kearney
RW	14	Keith Earls
OC	13	Chris Farrell
IC	12	Bundee Aki	(substituted off) 13'
LW	11	Jacob Stockdale
FH	10	Johnny Sexton	(substituted off) 78'
SH	9	Conor Murray	(substituted off) 71'
N8	8	Jordi Murphy
OF	7	Seán O'Brien	(substituted off) 58'
BF	6	Peter O'Mahony (c)
RL	5	Quinn Roux
LL	4	Ultan Dillane	32' to 40'		(substituted off) 58'
TP	3	Tadhg Furlong	(substituted off) 63'
HK	2	Seán Cronin	(substituted off) 47'	(substituted on) 74'
LP	1	Dave Kilcoyne	(substituted off) 63'
Replacements:
HK	16	Niall Scannell	(substituted on) 47'	(substituted off) 74'
PR	17	Jack McGrath	(substituted on) 63'
PR	18	John Ryan	(substituted on) 63'
LK	19	Iain Henderson	(substituted on) 32'	(substituted off) 40'	(substituted on) 58'
FL	20	Josh van der Flier	(substituted on) 58'
SH	21	John Cooney	(substituted on) 71'
FH	22	Jack Carty	(substituted on) 78'
WG	23	Andrew Conway	(substituted on) 13'
Coach:
Joe Schmidt

Man of the Match:
Peter O'Mahony (Ireland)

Touch judges:
Wayne Barnes (England)
Karl Dickson (England)
Television match official:
Graham Hughes (England)

Notes:

- Jack Carty (Ireland) made his international debut.

=== Round 4 ===
9 March 2019
14:15 GMT (UTC+0)

(1 BP) Scotland	11–18	Wales
Try: D. Graham 58' m Pen: Russell (2/2)	Report; Match data	Try: Adams 13' c J. Davies 30' m Con: Anscombe (1/2) 14'; Pen: Anscombe (2/3) 24', 80'

Murrayfield Stadium, Edinburgh
Attendance: 67,144
Referee: Pascal Gaüzère (France)

FB	15	Blair Kinghorn	(substituted off) 32'
RW	14	Tommy Seymour	(substituted off) 21'
OC	13	Nick Grigg
IC	12	Peter Horne
LW	11	Darcy Graham	(substituted off) 65'
FH	10	Finn Russell
SH	9	Ali Price
N8	8	Josh Strauss			(substituted off) 65'
OF	7	Jamie Ritchie	(substituted off) 9'		(substituted on) 21'
BF	6	Magnus Bradbury
RL	5	Jonny Gray	(substituted off) 65'
LL	4	Grant Gilchrist
TP	3	WP Nel	(substituted off) 65'
HK	2	Stuart McInally (c)				(substituted off) 70'
LP	1	Allan Dell
Replacements:
HK	16	Fraser Brown		(substituted on) 15'	(substituted off) 21'	(substituted on) 70'
PR	17	Gordon Reid
PR	18	Simon Berghan	(substituted on) 65'
LK	19	Ben Toolis	(substituted on) 65'
FL	20	Hamish Watson	(substituted on) 9'	(substituted off) 15'	(substituted on) 65'
SH	21	Greig Laidlaw	(substituted on) 65'
FH	22	Adam Hastings	(substituted on) 32'
WG	23	Byron McGuigan	(substituted on) 21'
Coach:
Gregor Townsend

FB	15	Liam Williams	(substituted off) 48'
RW	14	George North
OC	13	Jonathan Davies
IC	12	Hadleigh Parkes	(substituted off) 74'
LW	11	Josh Adams
FH	10	Gareth Anscombe
SH	9	Gareth Davies	(substituted off) 70'
N8	8	Ross Moriarty	(substituted off) 70'
OF	7	Justin Tipuric
BF	6	Josh Navidi
RL	5	Alun Wyn Jones (c)
LL	4	Adam Beard	21' to 32'		(substituted off) 62'
TP	3	Tomas Francis	(substituted off) 65'
HK	2	Ken Owens	(substituted off) 65'
LP	1	Rob Evans	(substituted off) 62'
Replacements:
HK	16	Elliot Dee	(substituted on) 65'
PR	17	Nicky Smith	(substituted on) 62'
PR	18	Dillon Lewis	(substituted on) 65'
LK	19	Jake Ball	(substituted on) 21'	(substituted off) 32'	(substituted on) 62'
FL	20	Aaron Wainwright	(substituted on) 70'
SH	21	Aled Davies	(substituted on) 70'
FH	22	Dan Biggar	(substituted on) 48'
CE	23	Owen Watkin	(substituted on) 74'
Coach:
Warren Gatland

Man of the Match:
Hadleigh Parkes (Wales)

Touch judges:
Luke Pearce (England)
Federico Anselmi (Argentina)
Television match official:
Marius Jonker (South Africa)

Notes

- Wales retained the Doddie Weir Cup.
- This 13th consecutive victory continued Wales' best winning run.

9 March 2019
16:45 GMT (UTC+0)

(1 BP) England	57–14	Italy
Try: George 8' c May 15' c Tuilagi (2) 21' c, 47' m Shields (2) 32' c, 79' c Kruis 64' c Robson 68' c Con: Farrell (4/5) 9', 16', 22', 33'; Ford (3/3) 65', 69', 80'; Pen: Farrell (1/1) 26'	Report; Match data	Try: Allan 12' c Morisi 54' c Con: Allan (2/2) 14', 56'

Twickenham Stadium, London
Attendance: 82,022
Referee: Nic Berry (Australia)

FB	15	Elliot Daly
RW	14	Joe Cokanasiga
OC	13	Manu Tuilagi	(substituted off) 62'
IC	12	Ben Te'o
LW	11	Jonny May
FH	10	Owen Farrell (c)	(substituted off) 62'
SH	9	Ben Youngs	(substituted off) 62'
N8	8	Billy Vunipola
OF	7	Tom Curry	(substituted off) 56'
BF	6	Brad Shields
RL	5	George Kruis
LL	4	Joe Launchbury	(substituted off) 66'
TP	3	Kyle Sinckler	(substituted off) 56'
HK	2	Jamie George	(substituted off) 59'
LP	1	Ellis Genge	(substituted off) 59'
Replacements:
HK	16	Luke Cowan-Dickie	(substituted on) 59'
PR	17	Ben Moon	(substituted on) 59'
PR	18	Dan Cole	(substituted on) 56'
LK	19	Nathan Hughes	(substituted on) 66'
FL	20	Mark Wilson	(substituted on) 56'
SH	21	Dan Robson	(substituted on) 62'
FH	22	George Ford	(substituted on) 62'
CE	23	Henry Slade	(substituted on) 62'
Coach:
Eddie Jones

FB	15	Jayden Hayward
RW	14	Edoardo Padovani
OC	13	Michele Campagnaro	(substituted off) 23'
IC	12	Luca Morisi	(substituted off) 62'
LW	11	Angelo Esposito
FH	10	Tommaso Allan
SH	9	Tito Tebaldi
N8	8	Sergio Parisse (c)
OF	7	Braam Steyn
BF	6	Sebastian Negri	(substituted off) 49'
RL	5	Dean Budd	(substituted off) 49'
LL	4	Federico Ruzza
TP	3	Simone Ferrari	(substituted off) 49'
HK	2	Luca Bigi	(substituted off) 49'
LP	1	Andrea Lovotti
Replacements:
HK	16	Leonardo Ghiraldini	(substituted on) 49'
PR	17	Cherif Traorè	(substituted on) 62'
PR	18	Tiziano Pasquali	(substituted on) 49'
LK	19	David Sisi	(substituted on) 49'
FL	20	Jake Polledri	(substituted on) 49'
SH	21	Guglielmo Palazzani	(substituted on) 62'
FH	22	Ian McKinley		(substituted on) 33'
CE	23	Tommaso Castello	(substituted on) 23'	(substituted off) 33'
Coach:
Conor O'Shea

Man of the Match:
Joe Cokanasiga (England)

Touch judges:
Paul Williams (New Zealand)
Andrew Brace (Ireland)
Television match official:
Simon McDowell (Ireland)

Notes:

- This result meant Italy won the Wooden Spoon for the fourth consecutive year, and their 14th since joining the Six Nations.

10 March 2019
15:00 GMT (UTC+0)

(1 BP) Ireland	26–14	France
Try: Best 3' c Sexton 30' c Conan 36' m Earls 56' c Con: Sexton (3/4) 4', 31', 58'	Report; Match data	Try: Huget 77' c Chat 80+1' c Con: Serin (2/2) 77', 80+4'

Aviva Stadium, Dublin
Attendance: 51,000
Referee: Ben O'Keeffe (New Zealand)

FB	15	Jordan Larmour
RW	14	Keith Earls	(substituted off) 76'
OC	13	Garry Ringrose
IC	12	Bundee Aki
LW	11	Jacob Stockdale
FH	10	Johnny Sexton	(substituted off) 58'
SH	9	Conor Murray	(substituted off) 58'
N8	8	CJ Stander
OF	7	Josh van der Flier	(substituted off) 24'
BF	6	Peter O'Mahony
RL	5	James Ryan
LL	4	Iain Henderson	(substituted off) 58'
TP	3	Tadhg Furlong	(substituted off) 58'
HK	2	Rory Best (c)	(substituted off) 58'
LP	1	Cian Healy	(substituted off) 51'
Replacements:
HK	16	Niall Scannell	(substituted on) 58'
PR	17	Dave Kilcoyne	(substituted on) 51'
PR	18	John Ryan	(substituted on) 58'
LK	19	Ultan Dillane	(substituted on) 58'
N8	20	Jack Conan	(substituted on) 24'
SH	21	John Cooney	(substituted on) 58'
FH	22	Jack Carty	(substituted on) 58'
FB	23	Andrew Conway	(substituted on) 76'
Coach:
Joe Schmidt

FB	15	Thomas Ramos		(substituted off) 63'
RW	14	Damian Penaud
OC	13	Mathieu Bastareaud
IC	12	Gaël Fickou
LW	11	Yoann Huget
FH	10	Romain Ntamack		(substituted off) 76'
SH	9	Antoine Dupont		(substituted off) 72'
N8	8	Louis Picamoles					(substituted off) 69'	(substituted on) 79'
OF	7	Arthur Iturria
BF	6	Wenceslas Lauret		(substituted off) 11'
RL	5	Félix Lambey		(substituted off) 63'
LL	4	Sébastien Vahaamahina
TP	3	Demba Bamba		(substituted off) 13'	(substituted on) 20'	(substituted off) 63'	(substituted on) 69'	(substituted off) 79'
HK	2	Guilhem Guirado (c)		(substituted off) 72'
LP	1	Jefferson Poirot		(substituted off) 17'
Replacements:
HK	16	Camille Chat		(substituted on) 72'
PR	17	Étienne Falgoux		(substituted on) 17'
PR	18	Dorian Aldegheri	(yellow card) 68'	(substituted on) 13'	(substituted off) 20'	(substituted on) 63'
LK	19	Paul Willemse		(substituted on) 63'
N8	20	Grégory Alldritt		(substituted on) 11'
SH	21	Baptiste Serin		(substituted on) 72'
FH	22	Anthony Belleau		(substituted on) 76'
FB	23	Maxime Médard		(substituted on) 63'
Coach:
Jacques Brunel

Man of the Match:
James Ryan (Ireland)

Touch judges:
Angus Gardner (Australia)
Karl Dickson (England)
Television match official:
Ben Skeen (New Zealand)

Notes

- Rob Kearney was originally named at fullback for Ireland, but withdrew due to a calf injury and was replaced by Jordan Larmour; Andrew Conway replaced Larmour on the bench.
- Ireland's half-time lead of 19–0 is their largest against France.

=== Round 5 ===
16 March 2019
13:30 CET (UTC+1)

Italy	14–25	France
Try: Tebaldi 55' m Pen: Allan (3/3) 6', 12', 43'	Report	Try: Dupont 16' c Huget 46' c Penaud 79' m Con: Ntamack (2/3) 17', 48'; Pen: Ntamack (1/1) 21'; Drop: Ntamack (1/1) 63'

Stadio Olimpico, Rome
Attendance: 48,820
Referee: Matthew Carley (England)

FB	15	Jayden Hayward
RW	14	Edoardo Padovani
OC	13	Marco Zanon
IC	12	Luca Morisi
LW	11	Angelo Esposito	(substituted off) 68'
FH	10	Tommaso Allan
SH	9	Tito Tebaldi
N8	8	Sergio Parisse (c)
OF	7	Jake Polledri
BF	6	Braam Steyn	(substituted off) 64'
RL	5	Federico Ruzza
LL	4	David Sisi	(substituted off) 59'
TP	3	Tiziano Pasquali	(substituted off) 46'
HK	2	Leonardo Ghiraldini	(substituted off) 58'
LP	1	Andrea Lovotti	(substituted off) 68'
Replacements:
HK	16	Luca Bigi	(substituted on) 58'
PR	17	Cherif Traorè	(substituted on) 68'
PR	18	Simone Ferrari	(substituted on) 46'
LK	19	Alessandro Zanni	(substituted on) 59'
FL	20	Sebastian Negri	(substituted on) 64'
SH	21	Guglielmo Palazzani
FH	22	Ian McKinley
WG	23	Luca Sperandio	(substituted on) 68'
Coach:
Conor O'Shea

FB	15	Maxime Médard
RW	14	Damian Penaud
OC	13	Mathieu Bastareaud
IC	12	Wesley Fofana
LW	11	Yoann Huget		(substituted off) 69'
FH	10	Romain Ntamack		(substituted off) 80'
SH	9	Antoine Dupont		(substituted off) 57'
N8	8	Louis Picamoles
OF	7	Yacouba Camara		(substituted off) 75'
BF	6	Grégory Alldritt		(substituted off) 58'
RL	5	Paul Willemse		(substituted off) 60'
LL	4	Félix Lambey
TP	3	Demba Bamba
HK	2	Guilhem Guirado (c)		(substituted off) 19'
LP	1	Étienne Falgoux		(substituted off) 65'
Replacements:
HK	16	Camille Chat	(yellow card) 72'	(substituted on) 19'
PR	17	Dany Priso		(substituted on) 65'
PR	18	Dorian Aldegheri		(substituted on) 75'
LK	19	Paul Gabrillagues		(substituted on) 60'
LK	20	Arthur Iturria		(substituted on) 58'
SH	21	Baptiste Serin		(substituted on) 57'
FH	22	Camille Lopez		(substituted on) 80'
FB	23	Thomas Ramos		(substituted on) 69'
Coach:
Jacques Brunel

Man of the Match:
Sergio Parisse (Italy)

Touch judges:
Nigel Owens (Wales)
Andrew Brace (Ireland)
Television match official:
Graham Hughes (England)

Notes:

- Marco Zanon (Italy) made his international debut.
- Italy were whitewashed for the fourth consecutive year.
- France retained the Giuseppe Garibaldi Trophy.

16 March 2019
14:45 GMT (UTC+0)

Wales	25–7	Ireland
Try: Parkes 2' c Con: Anscombe (1/1) 3'; Pen: Anscombe (6/6) 18', 36', 40+2', 49', 54', 70'	Report	Try: Larmour 80+3' c Con: Carty (1/1) 80+4'

Millennium Stadium, Cardiff
Attendance: 74,500
Referee: Angus Gardner (Australia)

FB	15	Liam Williams
RW	14	George North	(substituted off) 9'
OC	13	Jonathan Davies
IC	12	Hadleigh Parkes	(substituted off) 71'
LW	11	Josh Adams
FH	10	Gareth Anscombe
SH	9	Gareth Davies	(substituted off) 57'
N8	8	Ross Moriarty	(substituted off) 71'
OF	7	Justin Tipuric
BF	6	Josh Navidi
RL	5	Alun Wyn Jones (c)
LL	4	Adam Beard	(substituted off) 71'
TP	3	Tomas Francis	(substituted off) 54'
HK	2	Ken Owens	(substituted off) 60'
LP	1	Rob Evans	(substituted off) 54'
Replacements:
HK	16	Elliot Dee	(substituted on) 60'
PR	17	Nicky Smith	(substituted on) 54'
PR	18	Dillon Lewis	(substituted on) 54'
LK	19	Jake Ball	(substituted on) 71'
FL	20	Aaron Wainwright	(substituted on) 71'
SH	21	Aled Davies	(substituted on) 57'
FH	22	Dan Biggar	(substituted on) 9'
CE	23	Owen Watkin	(substituted on) 71'
Coach:
Warren Gatland

FB	15	Rob Kearney	(substituted off) 65'
RW	14	Keith Earls
OC	13	Garry Ringrose
IC	12	Bundee Aki
LW	11	Jacob Stockdale
FH	10	Johnny Sexton	(substituted off) 73'
SH	9	Conor Murray	(substituted off) 71'
N8	8	CJ Stander
OF	7	Seán O'Brien	(substituted off) 52'
BF	6	Peter O'Mahony
RL	5	James Ryan
LL	4	Tadhg Beirne	(substituted off) 59'
TP	3	Tadhg Furlong	(substituted off) 65'
HK	2	Rory Best (c)	(substituted off) 65'
LP	1	Cian Healy	(substituted off) 59'
Replacements:
HK	16	Niall Scannell	(substituted on) 65'
PR	17	Dave Kilcoyne	(substituted on) 59'
PR	18	Andrew Porter	(substituted on) 65'
LK	19	Quinn Roux	(substituted on) 59'
N8	20	Jack Conan	(substituted on) 52'
SH	21	Kieran Marmion	(substituted on) 71'
FH	22	Jack Carty	(substituted on) 73'
FB	23	Jordan Larmour	(substituted on) 65'
Coach:
Joe Schmidt

Man of the Match:
Gareth Anscombe (Wales)

Touch judges:
Ben O'Keeffe (New Zealand)
Karl Dickson (England)
Television match official:
Marius Jonker (South Africa)

Notes:

- Hadleigh Parkes' try was Wales' fastest against Ireland.
- This was Wales' biggest margin of victory over Ireland since 1976.
- Wales won their 12th Grand Slam, their fourth since the expansion of the tournament in 2000 (a record) and also their third under Warren Gatland, a record for a coach.
- This was the last Six Nations match for Gatland and Joe Schmidt as coaches of Wales and Ireland, respectively, having both announced prior to the tournament their resignations following the 2019 Rugby World Cup; however, Gatland returned to coach Wales in the 2023 tournament.

16 March 2019
17:00 GMT (UTC+0)

(1 BP) England	38–38	Scotland (1 BP)
Try: Nowell 2' c Curry 9' c Launchbury 13' c May 29' c Ford 80+3' c Con: Farrell (4/4) 3', 10', 15', 31'; Ford (1/1) 80+4'; Pen: Farrell 25'	Report	Try: McInally 35' c Graham (2) 47' m, 57' m Bradbury 50' c Russell 60' c Johnson 76' c Con: Russell (2/3) 36', 51'; Laidlaw (2/3) 60', 77'

Twickenham Stadium, London
Attendance: 82,000
Referee: Paul Williams (New Zealand)

FB	15	Elliot Daly
RW	14	Jack Nowell
OC	13	Henry Slade
IC	12	Manu Tuilagi	(substituted off) 78'
LW	11	Jonny May
FH	10	Owen Farrell (c)	(substituted off) 70'
SH	9	Ben Youngs	(substituted off) 74'
N8	8	Billy Vunipola
OF	7	Tom Curry
BF	6	Mark Wilson	(substituted off) 62'
RL	5	George Kruis
LL	4	Joe Launchbury	(substituted off) 74'
TP	3	Kyle Sinckler	(substituted off) 51'
HK	2	Jamie George	(substituted off) 74'
LP	1	Ben Moon	(substituted off) 5'
Replacements:
HK	16	Luke Cowan-Dickie	(substituted on) 74'
PR	17	Ellis Genge	(substituted on) 5'
PR	18	Dan Cole	(substituted on) 51'
FL	19	Brad Shields	(substituted on) 62'
FL	20	Nathan Hughes	(substituted on) 74'
SH	21	Ben Spencer	(substituted on) 74'
FH	22	George Ford	(substituted on) 70'
CE	23	Ben Te'o	(substituted on) 78'
Coach:
Eddie Jones

FB	15	Sean Maitland	(substituted off) 68'
RW	14	Darcy Graham
OC	13	Nick Grigg	(substituted off) 57'
IC	12	Sam Johnson
LW	11	Byron McGuigan
FH	10	Finn Russell
SH	9	Ali Price	(substituted off) 57'
N8	8	Magnus Bradbury
OF	7	Hamish Watson
BF	6	Sam Skinner	(substituted off) 57'
RL	5	Grant Gilchrist	(substituted off) 57'
LL	4	Ben Toolis
TP	3	WP Nel	(substituted off) 61'
HK	2	Stuart McInally (c)	(substituted off) 57'
LP	1	Allan Dell	(substituted off) 45'
Replacements:
HK	16	Fraser Brown	(substituted on) 57'
PR	17	Gordon Reid	(substituted on) 45'
PR	18	Simon Berghan	(substituted on) 61'
LK	19	Jonny Gray	(substituted on) 57'
FL	20	Josh Strauss	(substituted on) 57'
SH	21	Greig Laidlaw	(substituted on) 57'
FH	22	Adam Hastings	(substituted on) 68'
CE	23	Chris Harris	(substituted on) 57'
Coach:
Gregor Townsend

Man of the Match:
Finn Russell (Scotland)

Touch judges:
Jérôme Garcès (France)
Federico Anselmi (Argentina)
Television match official:
Ben Skeen (New Zealand)

Notes:

- This was the highest-scoring draw in international rugby history at 76 total points scored.
- This was the first time England had conceded a try bonus point in the Six Nations; they became the final team to do so since bonus points were introduced in 2017.
- Scotland retained the Calcutta Cup; this was the first time since 1984 they had done so, and the first time since 1989 they had not lost to England at Twickenham (the 1989 match was also a draw).
- The 24-point half-time deficit (and 31-point deficit after 30 minutes) Scotland turned around, was the largest comeback for a draw in international rugby history, beating their own previous record against Wales in 2001.
- With Jonny May's try in the 31st minute, England earned the fastest bonus point try in the Six Nations, beating the previous record they set against Italy the previous week.
- Scotland's six tries were the most they had scored in a match at Twickenham.

== Player statistics ==
=== Most points ===
Pos	Name	Team	Pts
1	Owen Farrell	England	59
2	Gareth Anscombe	Wales	43
3	Tommaso Allan	Italy	34
4	Jonny May	England	30
5	Johnny Sexton	Ireland	23
6	Dan Biggar	Wales	21
6	Greig Laidlaw	Scotland	21
8	Yoann Huget	France	20
9	Finn Russell	Scotland	17
10	Conor Murray	Ireland	16

=== Most tries ===
Pos	Name	Team	Tries
1	Jonny May	England	6
2	Yoann Huget	France	4
3	Josh Adams	Wales	3
3	Keith Earls	Ireland	3
3	Darcy Graham	Scotland	3
3	Blair Kinghorn	Scotland	3
3	Edoardo Padovani	Italy	3
3	Henry Slade	England	3
9	Grégory Alldritt	France	2
9	Tom Curry	England	2
9	Sam Johnson	Scotland	2
9	Luca Morisi	Italy	2
9	Conor Murray	Ireland	2
9	George North	Wales	2
9	Damian Penaud	France	2
9	Brad Shields	England	2
9	Jacob Stockdale	Ireland	2
9	Manu Tuilagi	England	2
