= Jonny May =

England rugby union footballer (born 1990)

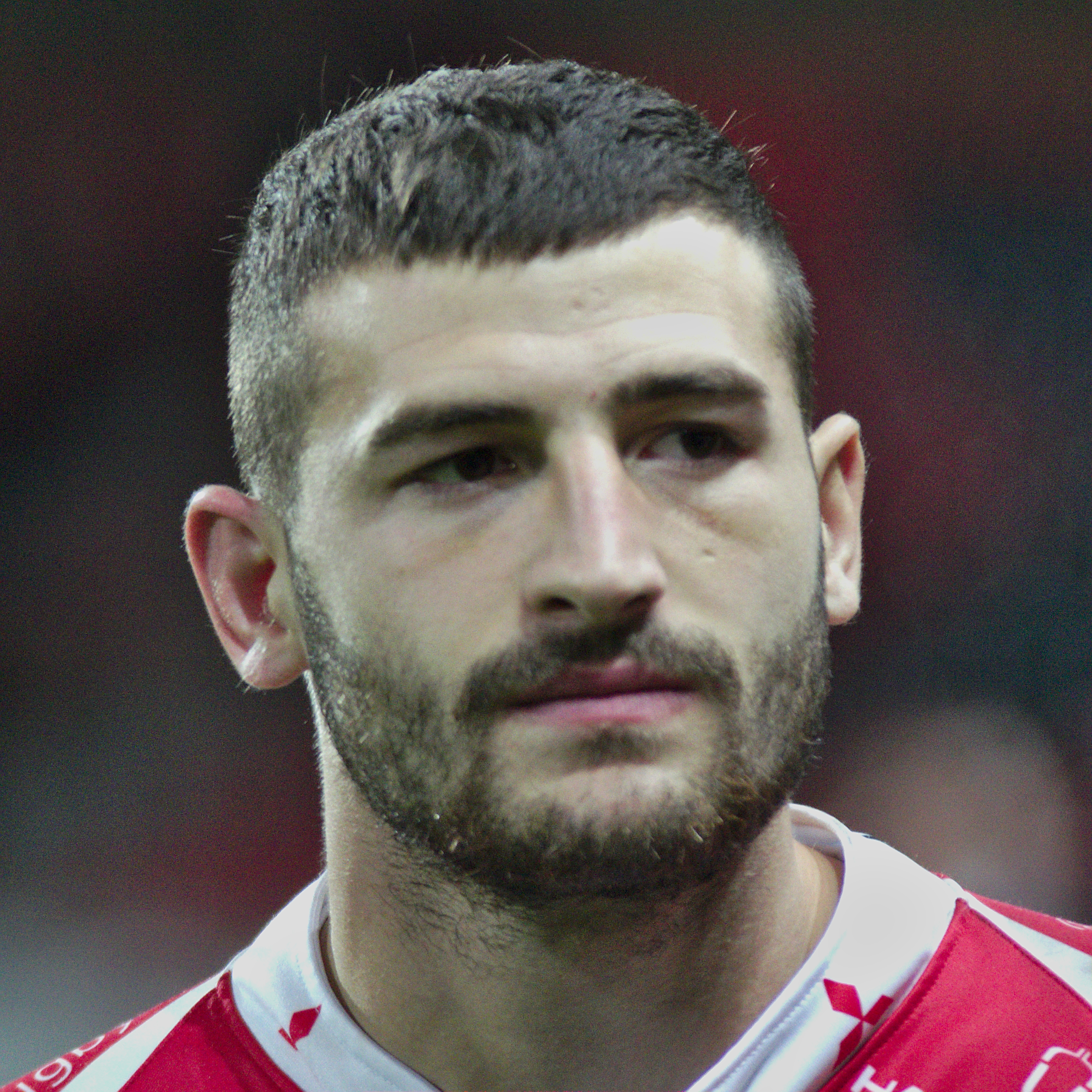
- May representing Gloucester during the Aviva Premiership
- Full name: Jonathan James May
- Born: 1 April 1990 (age 36) Chiseldon, England
- Height: 1.88 m (6 ft 2 in)
- Weight: 90 kg (198 lb; 14 st 2 lb)
- School: Hartpury College

Rugby union career
- Position: Wing
- Current team: Soyaux Angoulême
Senior career
Years	Team	Apps	(Points)
2009–2017	Gloucester	138	(310)
2009–2010	→ Moseley (loan)	15	(30)
2017–2020	Leicester Tigers	44	(150)
2020–2024	Gloucester	55	(80)
2024–2026	Soyaux Angoulême	28	(40)
International career
Years	Team	Apps	(Points)
2010	England U20s	8	(30)
2012	England Saxons	3	(0)
2013–2023	England	78	(180)
2024	Barbarians	1	(10)

Jonathan James May (born 1 April 1990) is an English professional rugby union player who plays as a wing for Pro D2 club Soyaux Angoulême and formerly for the England national team.

May began his senior career at Gloucester, and also played for Moseley on loan. He moved to Leicester Tigers in 2017 and returned to Gloucester in July 2020. He made his debut for England in 2013. He earned 78 caps and scored 36 tries making him England's second highest try scorer. He announced his retirement from international rugby in October 2023.

== Early life ==
May was born in Chiseldon, Wiltshire. He studied at St Francis School, Pewsey before he attended The Ridgeway School and Sixth Form College. As a child, May spent time playing and training at Wootton Bassett RFC in their Mini & Junior teams. He also trained with the academy of Swindon Town.

May then studied at Hartpury College, where he was a member of Hartpury College RFC, coached by Allan Lewis in a team that included future Wales and Lions wing Alex Cuthbert. A stint in Canberra led to a short spell with ACT Brumbies academy.

== Club career ==
After joining Gloucester's rugby academy, May made his first start for Gloucester Rugby in a pre-season friendly against Bath on 15 August 2009, and the next weekend he scored a try against Connacht after he had come off the bench. His first taste of first team action came in the Heineken Cup when he replaced Charlie Sharples against Newport Gwent Dragons and just over a month later he made his first start against London Wasps in the Anglo-Welsh Cup, playing on the wing.

On 20 February 2010, May was a late replacement for Gloucester's match against Leicester Tigers at Welford Road Stadium after Fuimaono-Sapolu pulled out with a 'dead leg'. Although Gloucester lost, May played well and scored a try on his Premiership debut. May made two more starts for Gloucester during the remainder of the season against London Wasps and Northampton Saints. During the 2009–10 campaign he also played for Championship club Moseley on loan.

In January 2012 May scored two tries from full-back at Kingsholm Stadium against Toulouse in the Heineken Cup. In March 2012 he was named as the inaugural winner of the LV= Breakthrough Player Award. May was named Gloucester's Young Player of the Year for 2011–2012, and his stunning solo effort against Harlequins was named Try-of-the-Season at the Aviva Premiership Awards. In December 2012, May signed a two-year contract extension with Gloucester until the end of the 2014–15 season.

On 24 October 2014, May signed a new long-term contract with Gloucester. At the end of that campaign, he scored the winning try in the 2014–15 European Rugby Challenge Cup semi-final victory over Exeter Chiefs. He started the final as Gloucester overcame Edinburgh to lift the trophy.

May scored the opening try in the 2016–17 European Rugby Challenge Cup final as Gloucester were defeated by Stade Français at Murrayfield to finish runners up. In August 2017, it was announced May had signed for Leicester Tigers in a swap deal with Ed Slater, after activating a little known clause in his Gloucester contract. May started his Leicester career strongly, scoring nine tries in his first eight appearances and earning the club's player of the month award.

After three seasons at Leicester, in April 2020, it was announced that May would return to Gloucester. He made his last appearance for Gloucester in the final of the 2023–24 EPCR Challenge Cup at Tottenham Hotspur Stadium which saw them beaten by Sharks to finish runners up. In total he scored 78 tries in 193 matches over two spells for the club.

In June 2024, it was announced that May had joined Pro D2 side Soyaux Angoulême. In April 2026, it was reported May would retire at the end of the 2025–26 season.

== International career ==
May scored a try for England U20 against Wales during the opening round of the 2010 Six Nations Under 20s Championship. He was a member of the side that finished fourth at the 2010 IRB Junior World Championship and recorded the final try of their semi-final defeat to Australia.

In January 2012 May made his first appearances for the England A team coming off the bench against Ireland Wolfhounds and then making his first start at that level against Scotland the following week. Later that year he was selected for the senior 2012 tour of South Africa and scored two tries in England's 57–31 tour fixture victory over South Africa Barbarians.

May was included in the squad for the 2013 tour of Argentina and on 15 June 2013 he made his Test debut starting in the last fixture as England won the series.

May was called up for the 2014 Six Nations Championship and started in all five games as England claimed their first Triple Crown for over a decade. He played in their opening fixture of the 2014 summer tour of New Zealand at Eden Park but was dropped for the last two tests. Later that year he scored his first try at international level in an autumn international defeat by New Zealand and followed up with another two tries against Samoa.

May scored a try against Ireland in their last warm-up fixture for the 2015 Rugby World Cup. He scored his only try of the tournament in a pool stage defeat against Wales as the hosts failed to reach the knock out phase. He was a member of the squad that won the 2017 Six Nations Championship. He scored tries against Wales, France and Ireland during the 2018 Six Nations Championship. Later that year he scored in all three of their matches during the 2018 tour of South Africa.

May was top try scorer during the 2019 Six Nations Championship, scoring six tries in total including a hat-trick against France and one apiece against Ireland, Italy and Scotland. Later that year he was included in the squad for the 2019 Rugby World Cup and scored a try during a pool stage victory over Argentina. May earned his fiftieth cap during the quarter-final which saw him score twice against Australia. He started in the final as England were defeated by South Africa to finish runners up.

May scored both of their tries during a defeat to France in the opening round of the 2020 Six Nations Championship. He started in the last round of the competition as England won away in Italy to claim the title. Later that year he scored two tries in a victory over Ireland during the Autumn Nations Cup. He started in the final as England defeated France in extra time to lift the trophy. In February 2021, May became England's second highest try scorer, surpassing Will Greenwood and Ben Cohen after scoring his thirty-second test try during the 2021 Six Nations Championship.

May was not initially included in the squad for the 2023 Rugby World Cup however he was a late injury replacement for Anthony Watson. He scored his thirty-sixth and last try for England in their warm-up defeat against Fiji. May started in five of their fixtures at the tournament including the semi-final elimination against champions South Africa as England finished third. After the world cup he announced his retirement from international rugby finishing with 36 tries in 78 caps.

In June 2024 May scored twice for the Barbarians in a game against Fiji at Twickenham.

== Career statistics ==
=== List of international tries ===
As of 17 September 2023.

Try	Opposing team	Venue	Competition	Date	Result	Score
1	New Zealand	Twickenham Stadium, London	2014 Autumn Internationals	8 November 2014	Loss	21 – 24
2	Samoa	Twickenham Stadium, London	2014 Autumn Internationals	22 November 2014	Win	28 – 9
3	Samoa	Twickenham Stadium, London	2014 Autumn Internationals	22 November 2014	Win	28 – 9
4	France	Twickenham Stadium, London	2015 Rugby World Cup warm-up matches	15 August 2015	Win	19 – 14
5	Ireland	Twickenham Stadium, London	2015 Rugby World Cup warm-up matches	5 September 2015	Win	21 – 13
6	Wales	Twickenham Stadium, London	2015 Rugby World Cup	26 September 2015	Loss	25 – 28
7	South Africa	Twickenham Stadium, London	2016 Autumn Internationals	12 November 2016	Win	37 – 21
8	Argentina	Twickenham Stadium, London	2016 Autumn Internationals	26 November 2016	Win	27 – 14
9	Argentina	Estadio San Juan del Bicentenario, San Juan	2017 England rugby union tour of Argentina	10 June 2017	Win	38 – 34
10	Australia	Twickenham Stadium, London	2017 Autumn Internationals	18 November 2017	Win	30 – 6
11	Wales	Twickenham Stadium, London	2018 Six Nations	10 February 2018	Win	12 – 6
12	Wales	Twickenham Stadium, London	2018 Six Nations	10 February 2018	Win	12 – 6
13	France	Stade de France, Paris	2018 Six Nations	10 March 2018	Loss	16 – 22
14	Ireland	Twickenham Stadium, London	2018 Six Nations	17 March 2018	Loss	15 – 24
15	South Africa	Ellis Park Stadium, Johannesburg	2018 England rugby union tour of South Africa	9 June 2018	Loss	39 – 42
16	South Africa	Free State Stadium, Bloemfontein	2018 England rugby union tour of South Africa	16 June 2018	Loss	12 – 23
17	South Africa	Newlands Stadium, Cape Town	2018 England rugby union tour of South Africa	23 June 2018	Win	25 – 10
18	Australia	Twickenham Stadium, London	2018 Autumn Internationals	24 November 2018	Win	37 – 18
19	Ireland	Aviva Stadium, Dublin	2019 Six Nations	2 February 2019	Win	32 – 20
20	France	Twickenham Stadium, London	2019 Six Nations	10 February 2019	Win	44 – 8
21	France	Twickenham Stadium, London	2019 Six Nations	10 February 2019	Win	44 – 8
22	France	Twickenham Stadium, London	2019 Six Nations	10 February 2019	Win	44 – 8
23	Italy	Twickenham Stadium, London	2019 Six Nations	9 March 2019	Win	57 – 14
24	Scotland	Twickenham Stadium, London	2019 Six Nations	16 March 2019	Draw	38 – 38
25	Argentina	Tokyo Stadium, Tokyo	2019 Rugby World Cup	5 October 2019	Win	39 – 10
26	Australia	Ōita Stadium, Ōita	2019 Rugby World Cup	19 October 2019	Win	40 – 16
27	Australia	Ōita Stadium, Ōita	2019 Rugby World Cup	19 October 2019	Win	40 – 16
28	France	Stade de France, Paris	2020 Six Nations	2 February 2020	Loss	17 – 24
29	France	Stade de France, Paris	2020 Six Nations	2 February 2020	Loss	17 – 24
30	Ireland	Twickenham Stadium, London	Autumn Nations Cup	21 November 2020	Win	18 – 7
31	Ireland	Twickenham Stadium, London	Autumn Nations Cup	21 November 2020	Win	18 – 7
32	Italy	Twickenham Stadium, London	2021 Six Nations	13 February 2021	Win	41 – 18
33	Ireland	Aviva Stadium, Dublin	2021 Six Nations	20 March 2021	Loss	18 – 32
34	Tonga	Twickenham Stadium, London	2021 Autumn Internationals	6 November 2021	Win	69 – 3
35	Tonga	Twickenham Stadium, London	2021 Autumn Internationals	6 November 2021	Win	69 – 3
36	Fiji	Twickenham Stadium, London	2023 Rugby World Cup warm-up matches	26 August 2023	Loss	22 – 30

=== International analysis by opposition ===
Against	Pld	W	D	L	T	C	P	DG	PTS	%Won
Argentina	6	6	0	0	3	0	0	0	15	100
Australia	7	6	0	1	4	0	0	0	20	85.71
Fiji	3	2	0	1	1	0	0	0	5	66.67
France	9	6	0	3	7	0	0	0	35	66.67
Georgia	1	1	0	0	0	0	0	0	0	100
Ireland	8	6	0	2	6	0	0	0	30	75
Italy	8	8	0	0	2	0	0	0	10	100
Japan	2	2	0	0	0	0	0	0	0	100
New Zealand	5	1	1	3	1	0	0	0	5	20
Samoa	3	3	0	0	2	0	0	0	10	100
Scotland	5	2	1	2	1	0	0	0	5	40
South Africa	10	4	0	6	4	0	0	0	20	40
Tonga	2	2	0	0	2	0	0	0	10	100
Wales	9	6	0	3	3	0	0	0	15	66.67
Total	78	55	2	21	36	0	0	0	180	70

== Honours ==
England

- 2× Six Nations Championship: 2017, 2020
- 1× Autumn Nations Cup: 2020
- 1x Rugby World Cup runner-up: 2019
- 1x Rugby World Cup 3rd place 2023

Gloucester

- 1× EPCR Challenge Cup: 2014–15
- 2× EPCR Challenge Cup runner up: 2016–17, 2023–24
