= Owen Watkin =

Wales international rugby union player

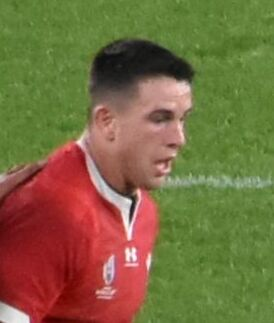
- Watkin representing Wales during the Rugby World Cup
- Full name: Owen Paul Watkin
- Born: 12 October 1996 (age 30) Bridgend, Wales
- Height: 1.88 m (6 ft 2 in)
- Weight: 100 kg (220 lb; 15 st 10 lb)
- School: Bridgend College

Rugby union career
- Position: Centre
- Current team: Ospreys
Senior career
Years	Team	Apps	(Points)
2015–	Ospreys	137	(60)
- Correct as of 13 August 2026
International career
Years	Team	Apps	(Points)
2015–2016	Wales U20	13	(10)
2017–	Wales	46	(10)
- Correct as of 13 August 2026

Owen Paul Watkin (born 12 October 1996) is a Welsh professional rugby union player who plays as a centre for United Rugby Championship club Ospreys and the Wales national team. He started his amateur career at Valley club, Ogmore vale RFC. .

== Club career ==
A product of the Ospreys Academy, he signed his first professional contract with his home region in 2016 having also featured for his hometown team, Bridgend Ravens.

Having made his regional debut for the Ospreys in September, 2015 as an 18-year-old, he has developed into a mainstay at the Liberty Stadium. After his breakthrough season in 2015/16 he suffered an anterior cruciate knee ligament injury in training in July, 2016, and was forced to spend more than a year on the sidelines.

== International career ==
After presenting great progress for his regional team, Watkin was selected in the 36 man squad for the Autumn internationals in 2017. He made his international test debut against Australia on 11 November 2017, replacing Owen Williams in the 68th minute. He was recognised by Warren Gatland as an upcoming star and was selected for multiple other squads, including the Grand Slam winning Welsh team in 2019. During the 2019 Six Nations Championship, Watkin scored a try against Italy after a cross-field kick from Gareth Anscombe. Wales' win against Italy was their 11th win in a row, beating their previous record.

Owen Watkin was selected in the 46 man training squad to travel to Switzerland in June 2019 ahead of the 2019 Rugby World Cup.

Watkin was selected for the 2020 Six Nations, but was due to miss at least the first match due to surgery on his knee. He started against Scotland, in the match that has been rescheduled to October due to Covid-19 regulations.

Watkin was named in the squad for the 2021 Six Nations. He started against Scotland, and completed a tap-tackle on Duhan van der Merwe, preventing him from scoring a try and subsequently winning the match.

Watkin was named in the squad for the 2026 Six Nations by Steve Tandy.

== Career statistics ==
=== List of international tries ===
No.	Date	Venue	Opponent	Score	Result	Competition
1	9 February 2019	Stadio Olimpico, Rome, Italy	Italy	24–10	26–15	2019 Six Nations Championship
2	19 March 2022	Millennium Stadium, Cardiff, Wales	Italy	5–6	21–22	2022 Six Nations Championship

as of 19 March 2022
