= Josh Adams (rugby union) =

British Lions & Wales international rugby union player

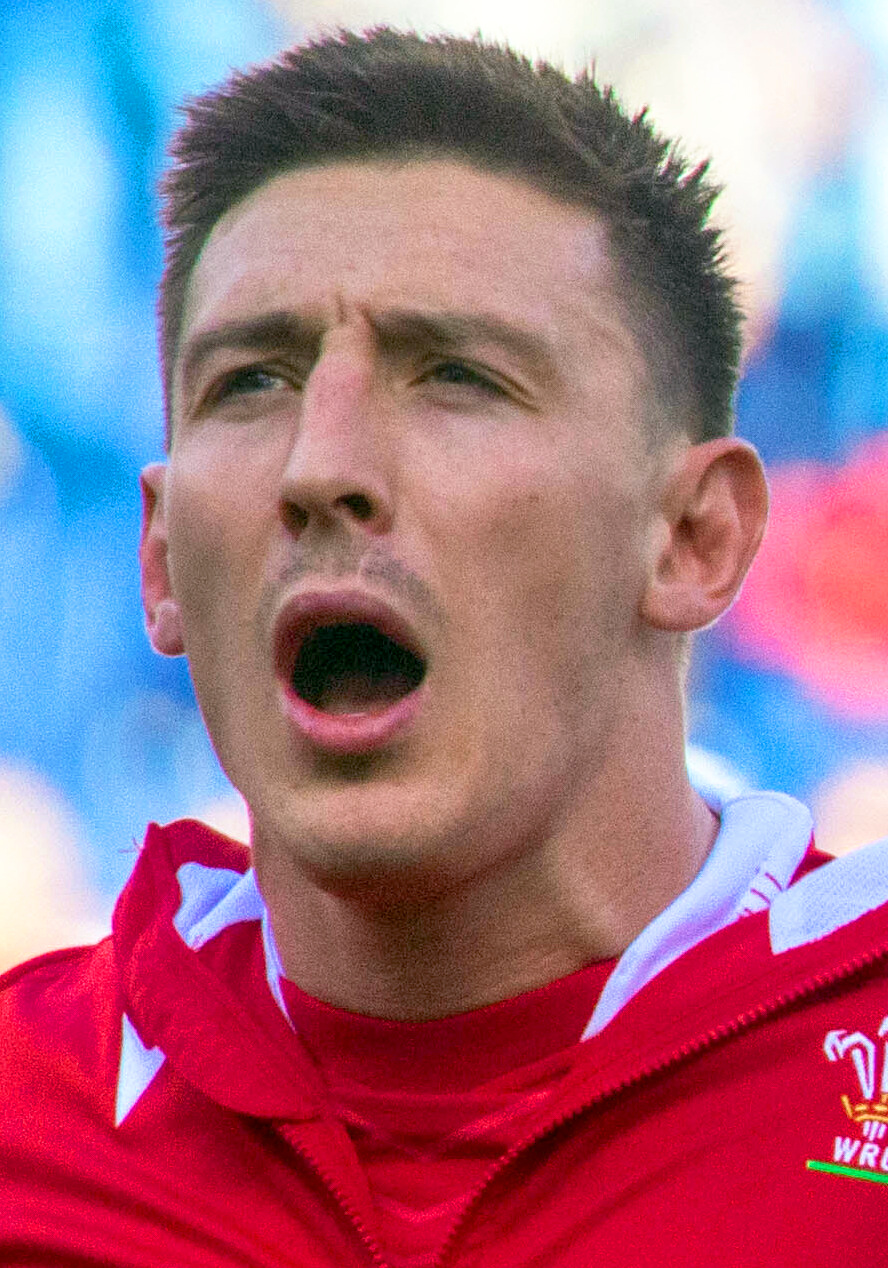
- Adams representing Wales during the Six Nations Championship
- Full name: Joshua Huw Adams
- Born: 21 April 1995 (age 31) Swansea, Wales
- Height: 1.83 m (6 ft 0 in)
- Weight: 95 kg (209 lb; 14 st 13 lb)
- School: Ysgol y Strade

Rugby union career
- Position(s): Wing, Fullback, Centre
- Current team: Cardiff Rugby
Senior career
Years	Team	Apps	(Points)
2012–2015	Llanelli	30	(49)
2013–2015	Scarlets	3	(0)
2014	Carmarthen Quins	2	(0)
2015–2019	Worcester Warriors	65	(195)
2016	→ Cinderford (loan)	7	(15)
2016	→ Nottingham (loan)	1	(0)
2019–	Cardiff Rugby	62	(185)
- Correct as of 18 November 2026
International career
Years	Team	Apps	(Points)
2014–2015	Wales U20	14	(40)
2018–	Wales	70	(110)
2021	British & Irish Lions	5	(40)
- Correct as of 18 November 2026

Joshua Huw Adams (born 21 April 1995) is a Welsh professional rugby union player who plays as a wing for United Rugby Championship club Cardiff and the Wales national team.

== Club career ==
Adams began his career with Llanelli and made his debut against Pontypridd in 2013. He went on to make a total of 30 appearances for the club, scoring 9 tries. He made his only Scarlets appearance in the Anglo-Welsh Cup defeat to Cardiff Rugby in 2014. He is also a previous Wales U20 international.

In May 2015, it was announced that Adams would move to Worcester from the 2015–16 season. In February 2016, Adams moved on loan to National League 1 side Cinderford until the end of the 2015–16 season.

On 22 December 2017, Adams scored two tries in a 23–8 win over relegation rivals London Irish, making him the top try scorer in the Premiership around the close of December 2017.

On 19 March 2019, Cardiff Rugby announced the signing of Adams on a long-term contract from the start of the 2019-2020 Pro14 season.

== International career ==
=== Wales ===
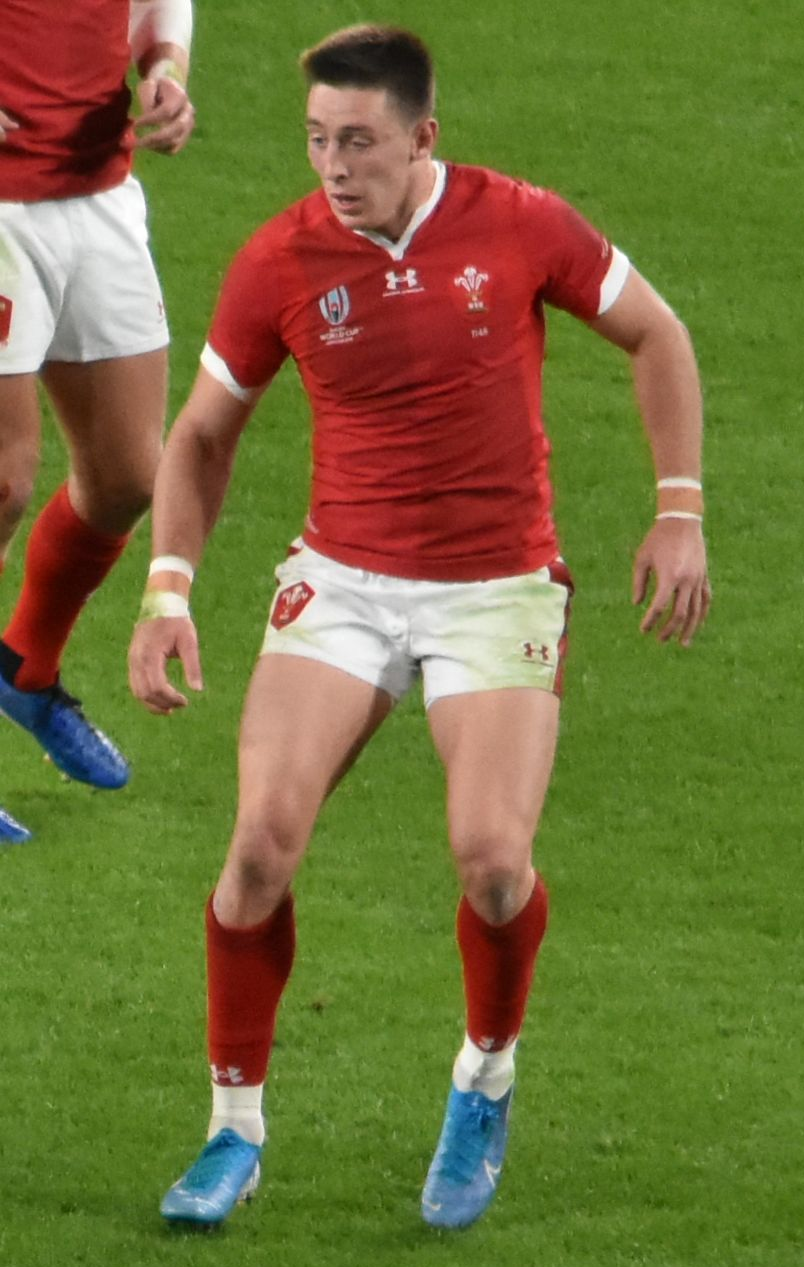
Adams was the top try scorer at the 2019 Rugby World Cup

In January 2018, Adams was called up to the Wales senior squad for the 2018 Six Nations Championship, and on 30 January he was named in the starting line-up for Wales' opening game at home to Scotland.

On 23 February 2019, Adams sealed a Six Nations third round win for Wales against England at the Cardiff's Millennium Stadium. A cross field kick from Welsh teammate Dan Biggar was gathered in the air by Adams and grounded. It was Adam's third try for Wales and meant England were all but defeated in the match. With Wales moving to first, heading into the fourth week of the 2019 Six Nations Championship. Wales won the Six Nations grand slam.

On 9 October 2019 Adams scored a hat-trick in a 29–17 win over Fiji at the 2019 Rugby World Cup. The win secured Wales's place in the quarter finals. Adams ended the 2019 Rugby World Cup in Japan as the top try-scorer for the competition.

On 1 February 2020 Adams scored a hat-trick for Wales in the 42-0 Six Nations win over Italy.

Adams was chosen for the 2022 Six Nations Championship, achieving tries against both England and Italy. He won Man of the Match against Italy, but gave his medal to Ange Capuozzo after the game.

Adams was selected for the 2025 end-of-year rugby union internationals. During the match against Japan, Adams was shown a yellow card that qualified for an off-field bunker review for a dangerous clear out on Kippei Ishida. He received a two-match ban, which meant he could not play in any further matches in the autumn

Adams was named in the squad for the 2026 Six Nations by Steve Tandy.

=== British and Irish Lions ===
On 6 May 2021, Adams was selected to represent the British & Irish Lions in the 2021 tour to South Africa. At the time of selection, Adams' wife Georgia was heavily pregnant.

On 26 June 2021, Adams made his Lions debut in a pre-tour warm up match against Japan at Murrayfield. Adams scored the opening try of the game as the Lions ran out 28-10 winners. Adams was then selected to play in the first provincial game of the tour against the Sigma Lions on 3 July 2021. Adams finished the game having scored four tries, becoming the first Lion since Shane Williams in 2005 to do so. Following Covid complications, Adams was drafted into the side for the following tour game against Cell C Sharks. Starting in an unfamiliar role at fullback, Adams maintained his strong start to the tour by scoring a hattrick of tries, taking his total to eight from three games.

== Career statistics ==
=== List of international tries ===
No.	Date	Venue	Opponent	Score	Result	Competition
1	16 June 2018	Estadio Estanislao López, Santa Fe, Argentina	Argentina	11–0	30–12	2018 Wales rugby union tour to Argentina and the United States
2	9 February 2019	Stadio Olimpico, Rome, Italy	Italy	17–10	26–15	2019 Six Nations Championship
3	23 February 2019	Millennium Stadium, Cardiff, Wales	England	21–13	21–13	2019 Six Nations Championship
4	9 March 2019	Murrayfield, Edinburgh, Scotland	Scotland	5–0	18–11	2019 Six Nations Championship
5	23 September 2019	Toyota Stadium, Toyota, Japan	Georgia	20–0	43–14	2019 Rugby World Cup
6	9 October 2019	Bank Dome, Oita, Japan	Fiji	5–10	29–17	2019 Rugby World Cup
7	9 October 2019	Bank Dome, Oita, Japan	Fiji	12–10	29–17	2019 Rugby World Cup
8	9 October 2019	Bank Dome, Oita, Japan	Fiji	22–17	29–17	2019 Rugby World Cup
9	13 October 2019	Egao Kenko Stadium, Kumamoto, Japan	Uruguay	12–6	35–13	2019 Rugby World Cup
10	27 October 2019	Nissan Stadium, Yokohama, Japan	South Africa	14–16	16–19	2019 Rugby World Cup
11	1 November 2019	Ajinomoto Stadium, Tokyo, Japan	New Zealand	15–35	17–40	2019 Rugby World Cup
12	1 February 2020	Millennium Stadium, Cardiff, Wales	Italy	14–0	42–0	2020 Six Nations Championship
13	1 February 2020	Millennium Stadium, Cardiff, Wales	Italy	19–0	42–0	2020 Six Nations Championship
14	1 February 2020	Millennium Stadium, Cardiff, Wales	Italy	40–0	42–0	2020 Six Nations Championship
15	27 February 2021	Millennium Stadium, Cardiff, Wales	England	8–3	40–24	2021 Six Nations Championship
16	13 March 2021	Stadio Olimpico, Rome, Italy	Italy	8–0	48–7	2021 Six Nations Championship
17	20 March 2021	Stade de France, Paris, France	France	25–17	30–32	2021 Six Nations Championship
18	26 June 2021	Murrayfield, Edinburgh, Scotland	Japan	5–0	28–10	2021 British & Irish Lions tour to South Africa
19	26 February 2022	Twickenham Stadium, London, England	England	5–17	19–23	2022 Six Nations Championship
20	19 March 2022	Millennium Stadium, Cardiff, Wales	Italy	19–15	21–22	2022 Six Nations Championship
21	9 July 2022	Toyota Stadium, Bloemfontein, South Africa	South Africa	11–12	13–12	2022 mid-year rugby union tests
22	10 September 2023	Stade de Bordeaux, Bordeaux, France	Fiji	8–0	32–26	2023 Rugby World Cup

as of 10 September 2023
