= Dave Sisi =

Italy international rugby union player

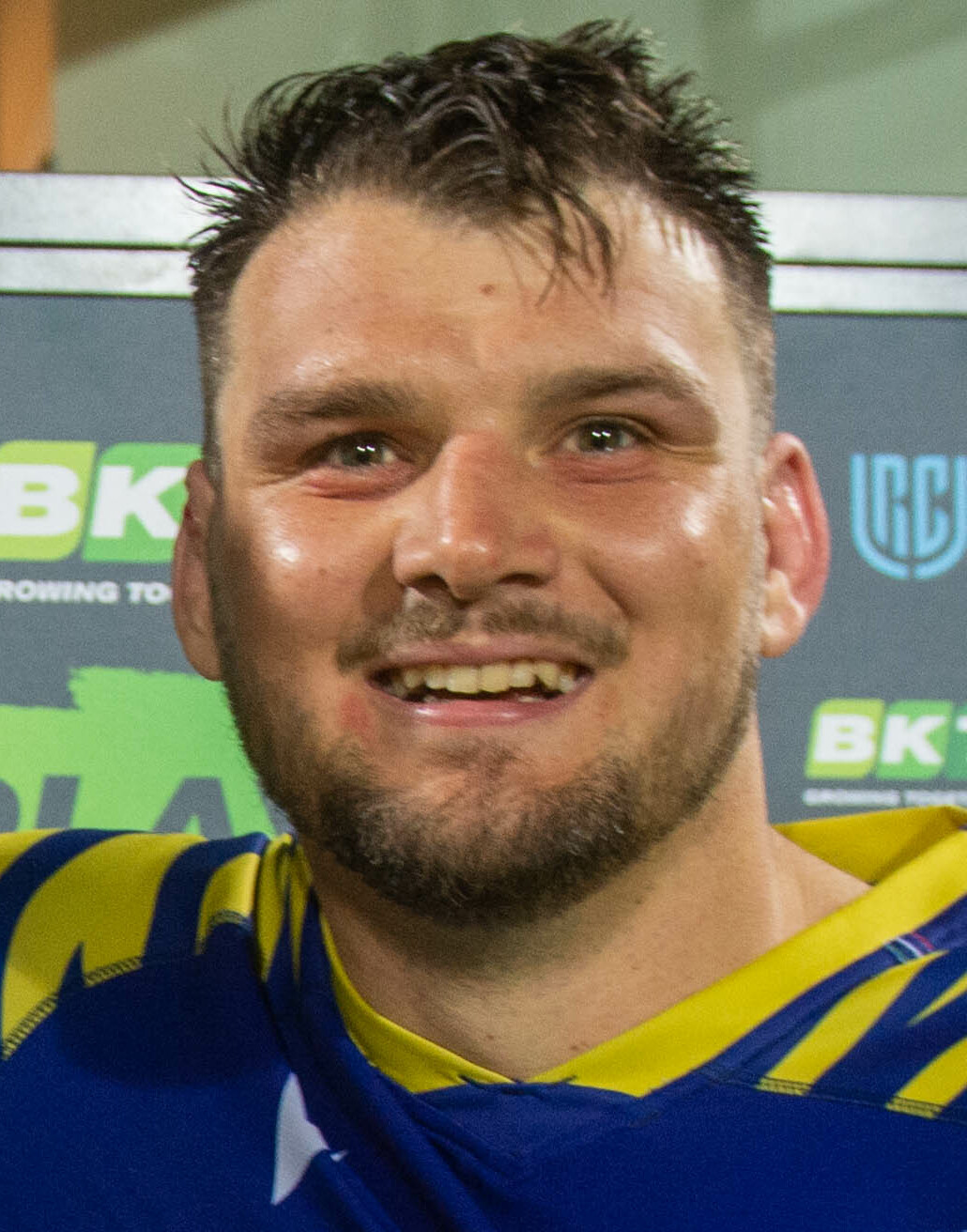
- Full name: David Alexander Sharp Sisi
- Born: 5 February 1993 (age 33) Rinteln, Germany
- Height: 193 cm (6 ft 4 in)
- Weight: 117 kg (258 lb; 18 st 6 lb)
- School: Hounsdown School and St. Paul's College

Rugby union career
- Position(s): Lock, Flanker, Number 8
- Current team: Zebre Parma
Senior career
Years	Team	Apps	(Points)
2010–2016	London Irish	24	(5)
2011–2017	London Scottish	6	(0)
2014–2017	Bath	21	(5)
2014	Leeds Tykes	11	(5)
2017–2024	Zebre Parma	104	(25)
- Correct as of 10 Dec 2022
International career
Years	Team	Apps	(Points)
2012–2013	England U20	14	(15)
2019–2023	Italy	30	(0)
- Correct as of 6 Oct 2023
Coaching career
- Years: Team
- 2024–: Zebre Parma (Assistant Coach)

David Alexander Sharp Sisi (born 5 February 1993) is a German-born Italian professional rugby union player who primarily played lock for Zebre Parma of the United Rugby Championship. He had also represented Italy on 30 occasions at international level, having made his test debut against Scotland during the 2019 Six Nations Championship. Sisi has previously played for clubs such as London Irish, London Scottish, Bath, and Leeds Tykes in the past.

From September 2024 he is Assistant Coach of Zebre Parma.

== Early life ==
Sisi is of Italian descent, and qualifies to play for Italy through his paternal grandparents and his father Carlo. His mother, Barbara, is English. He has a younger brother, Adam.

As a youngster he swam representing his county. Rugby was introduced to him at secondary school, aged 11. He joined local club, Tottonians and was picked by Hampshire RFU. At 16, he was offered a place on the London Irish AASE scheme; joining the London Irish academy and completing his schooling part time at St. Paul’s college, and afterwards accepting a full time contract with London Irish; at the time becoming their youngest player to represent their first team. With the England under 20 team, David won both the 6 Nations twice and a first Junior World Cup for England at the time.

== Professional career ==
Sisi moved to Bath where over the course of 4 years he also spent loan periods to Yorkshire Carnegie (formerly Leeds Carnegie), London Scottish and back to London Irish.

On 31 July 2017, Sisi signed for Italian club Zebre in the Pro14 from the 2017-18 season.

In 2012 and 2013, Sisi was named in the England Under 20 squad, but in 2019 he opted for Italy and on 18 August 2019, he was named in the final 31-man squad for the 2019 Rugby World Cup.

On 22 August 2023, he was named in the Italy's 33-man squad for the 2023 Rugby World Cup. David retired from professional rugby at the end of the 23-24 season, having been offered a coaching role with Zebre. He had over 100 caps for Zebre and 30 International appearances.
