= Étienne Falgoux =

France international rugby union player

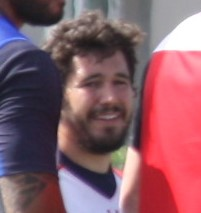
- Born: Étienne Falgoux; 19 January 1993 (age 33) Issoire, Puy-de-Dôme, France
- Height: 1.82 m (5 ft 11 1/2 in)
- Weight: 105 kg (16 st 7 lb)

Rugby union career
- Position: Prop
- Current team: Clermont Auvergne
Amateur team(s)
Years	Team	Apps	(Points)
–2013	Clermont Auvergne		
Senior career
Years	Team	Apps	(Points)
2013–	Clermont Auvergne	208	(35)
- Correct as of 23 February 2019
International career
Years	Team	Apps	(Points)
2019–	France	3	(0)
- Correct as of 16 March 2019

Étienne Falgoux (born 19 January 1993) is a French rugby union player, currently playing in the prop for Top 14 side Clermont Auvergne.

== International career ==
Falgoux won his first cap for France as a replacement in the side's win over Scotland in the 2019 Six Nations.

== Club career ==
In the 2016–17 Top 14 season, Falgoux won the championship, coming on as a substitute in the final win against Toulon.
