= Edoardo Padovani =

Italy international rugby union player

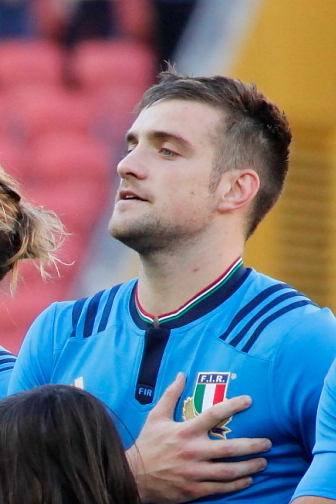
- Padovani representing Italy during their test series against Australia, June 2017
- Born: 15 May 1993 (age 33) Venice, Italy
- Height: 189 cm (6 ft 2 in)
- Weight: 95 kg (209 lb; 14 st 13 lb)

Rugby union career
- Position(s): Fullback, Fly-half, Wing
- Current team: Mogliano Veneto
Youth career
- F.I.R. Academy
Senior career
Years	Team	Apps	(Points)
2012–2014	Mogliano	43	(69)
2014–2017	Zebre Parma	50	(108)
2017	Toulon	4	(2)
2017–2020	Zebre Parma	33	(15)
2020–2024	Benetton	45	(94)
2024–	Mogliano Veneto		
- Correct as of 21 Jan 2023
International career
Years	Team	Apps	(Points)
2012–2013	Italy U20	18	(65)
2014	Emerging Italy	2	(15)
2016–	Italy	44	(68)
- Correct as of 11 Mar 2023

Edoardo Padovani (Italian pronunciation: [padoˈvaːni]; born 15 May 1993) is an Italian professional rugby union player who primarily plays fullback for Mogliano Veneto of the Serie A Elite. He has also represented Italy at international level, having made his test debut against England during the 2016 Six Nations Championship. Padovani has previously played for clubs such as Benetton, Zebre Parma, and Toulon in the past.

== Club career ==
Padovani played for Mogliano in the 2012-2013 and 2013–2014 season, playing 32 games, scoring 69 points.

Padovani joined Zebre in 2014/15, playing 13 games, scoring 11 points, playing 616 minutes in Pro 12. Playing 3 games, scoring 25 points in the EPCR. In the 2015/2016 season, he played 9 games, starting 3, scoring 15 points in Pro12, and playing 234 minutes. In the EPCR he played 6 games, starting 4 and scoring 32 points. In 2016/2017 he played 15 games, starting 9 and scoring 10 points in the Pro12 and playing 4 games, scoring 6 points in the EPCR. He did not renew a contract with Zebre Rugby and at the end of the season 2016–2017, he signed with Toulon.

Padovani joined Toulon for 2017 - 2018 season from Italian team Zebre. On 15 December 2017 Toulon released Padovani from the contract.

In December 2017, Padovani signed again with Zebre.

On 22 April 2020, Padovani left Zebre for local Italian rivals Benetton in the Pro14 ahead of the 2020–21 season. He played for Benetton until 2023–24 United Rugby Championship season.

== International career ==
In 2012 and 2013 Padovani played for Italy U20 and in 2014 for Emerging Italy. In 2016, he was selected for the Italian 6 Nations squad and made his debut against England in Round 2 of that Tournament. On 18 August 2019, he was named in the final 31-man squad for the 2019 Rugby World Cup.

On 19 March 2022, Padovani scored a try in the last minute of Italy Vs Wales to secure Italy's first Six Nations win in seven years.

=== International tries ===
As of 19 November 2022

Try	Opposing team	Location	Venue	Competition	Date	Result	Score
1	Australia	Brisbane, Australia	Suncorp Stadium	2017 June Internationals	24 June 2017	Loss	40 - 27
2	Scotland	Edinburgh, Scotland	Murrayfield Stadium	2019 Six Nations	2 February 2019	Loss	33 - 20
3	Wales	Rome, Italy	Stadio Olimpico	2019 Six Nations	9 February 2019	Loss	15 - 26
4	Ireland	Rome, Italy	Stadio Olimpico	2019 Six Nations	24 February 2019	Loss	16 - 26
5	Russia	San Benedetto del Tronto, Italy	Stadio Riviera delle Palme	2019 Rugby World Cup Warm-Ups	17 August 2019	Win	85 – 15
6	Russia	San Benedetto del Tronto, Italy	Stadio Riviera delle Palme	2019 Rugby World Cup Warm-Ups	17 August 2019	Win	85 – 15
7	Ireland	Dublin, Ireland	Aviva Stadium	2020 Six Nations	24 October 2020	Loss	50 - 17
8	Wales	Cardiff, Wales	Principality Stadium	2022 Six Nations	19 March 2022	Win	21 - 22
9	Portugal	Lisbon, Portugal	Estádio do Restelo	2022 July Internationals	25 June 2022	Win	31 - 38
