= Dan Robson =

England international rugby union footballer

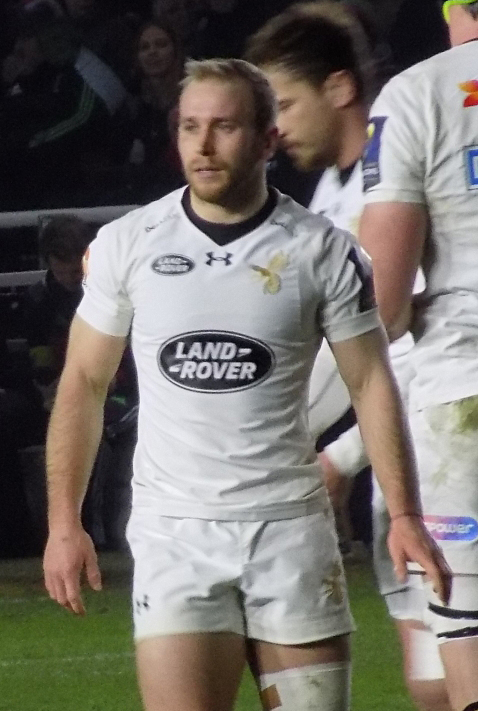
- Robson playing for Wasps in 2018
- Born: Daniel John Robson; 14 March 1992 (age 34) Stoke-on-Trent, England
- Height: 1.73 m (5 ft 8 in)
- Weight: 82 kg (12 st 13 lb; 181 lb)
- School: Newcastle-under-Lyme School

Rugby union career
- Position: Scrum-half
Senior career
| Years | Team | Apps | (Points) |
| 2010–2015 | Gloucester | 80 | (50) |
| 2010–2011 | → Moseley (loan) | 6 | (5) |
| 2015–2022 | Wasps | 150 | (193) |
| 2022–2026 | Pau | 90 | (38) |
| 2026- | Gloucester | | |
- Correct as of 4 September 2026
International career
| Years | Team | Apps | (Points) |
| 2011–2012 | England U20 | 19 | (20) |
| 2014 | England Saxons | 3 | (5) |
| 2019–2022 | England | 14 | (10) |
- Correct as of 10 July 2021

Dan Robson (born 14 March 1992) is an English professional rugby union player for Gloucester in the Premiership Rugby.

== Personal life ==
Born in Stoke-on-Trent, Robson attended Newcastle-under-Lyme School. His father was also a rugby player for Moseley and was on the bench in five different games for England without winning a cap.

Since the age of about 18 years old he has had the nickname of 'Dobby', named after the character in the Harry Potter film series. He was given this during his time playing for Gloucester Rugby and acquired this during the 'Milk Challenge'. The milk challenge is an initiation for new signings and graduates from the player academy and involves drinking 8 pints of milk in 20 minutes. Whilst undertaking this challenge, he vomited and apparently "looked like Dobby the house elf". On his move to Wasps Rugby he thought that he had 'gotten away with' no longer being called this as some of his new teammates did not know him by this name. However he feels that it was probably James Haskell who was responsible for the persistence of the nickname. He states that he has since "embraced" this and considers it "part of me".

== Club career ==
Robson first played rugby for his local club Stoke-on-Trent RUFC as a five-year-old and later had a season of men's rugby at Longton Rugby Club. He began his senior career with Gloucester in 2010 and in April 2013 it was announced that he had signed a two-year contract extension to keep him at the club until the end of the 2014–15 season. In his final season at the club Robson was on the bench for Gloucester as they defeated Edinburgh in the final of the European Rugby Challenge Cup.

On 8 January 2015 it was announced that Robson would leave Gloucester at the end of the season to join Wasps on a long-term deal. Robson started for the Wasps side that lost to Exeter Chiefs in the Premiership finals of 2017 and 2020.

Wasps entered administration on 17 October 2022 and Robson was made redundant along with all other players and coaching staff. Following his release from Wasps, Robson signed for French side Pau in the Top 14 from the 2022–23 season.

On the 16th December 2025, it was announced that Robson would return to Gloucester for the start of the 2026/27 season.

== International career ==
Robson was a member of the England under-20 team that achieved a grand slam in the 2011 Six Nations Under 20s Championship and later that year was part of the squad that finished runners up to New Zealand at the 2011 IRB Junior World Championship. The following year saw Robson score a try against Ireland in the 2012 Six Nations Under 20s Championship as England retained their title and he was also a member of the squad that finished seventh at the 2012 IRB Junior World Championship.

On 31 January 2014, Robson made his debut for England Saxons when they drew 16–16 against Scotland A in an international friendly. Robson was selected for the England squad to face the Barbarians in the summer of 2014 and on 1 June 2014 Robson made his debut for England in a non-cap friendly, losing to the Barbarians 39–29 at Twickenham Stadium. In June 2016 Robson scored a try for the England Saxons as they defeated South Africa A at Free State Stadium.

Robson was called up to the senior England squad by coach Eddie Jones on 1 August 2016 for a pre-season training squad. On 30 September 2016 he was subsequently named in the Test squad for the Autumn Internationals, however he remained an unused substitute. On 10 February 2019, Robson made his international test debut as a replacement for Ben Youngs against France in the 2019 Six Nations Championship and later during the tournament he also scored his first try in a game against Italy.

In November 2020 Robson scored another try against Georgia in their opening game of the Autumn Nations Cup and also came off the bench in the final of the competition as England defeated France in extra-time to win the tournament.

=== International tries ===
As of 14 November 2020.

| Try | Opposing team | Location | Venue | Competition | Date | Result | Score |
|---|---|---|---|---|---|---|---|
| 1 | Italy | London, England | Twickenham Stadium | 2019 Six Nations | 9 March 2019 | Win | 57 – 14 |
| 2 | Georgia | London, England | Twickenham Stadium | Autumn Nations Cup | 14 November 2020 | Win | 40 – 0 |
