= Yoann Huget =

France international rugby union player

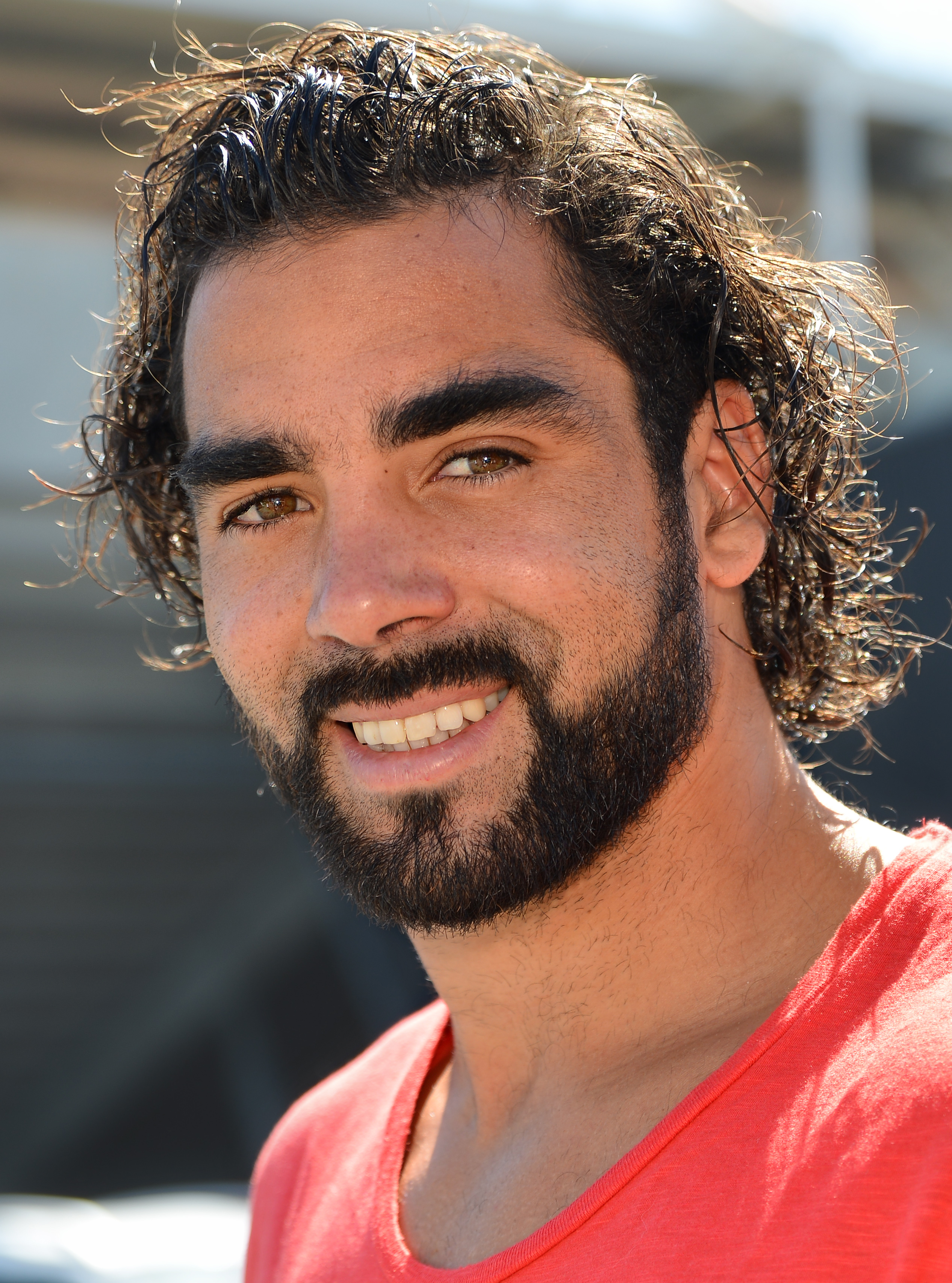
- Born: Yoann Huget; 2 June 1987 (age 39) Pamiers, France
- Height: 1.90 m (6 ft 3 in)
- Weight: 96 kg (15 st 2 lb; 212 lb)

Rugby union career
- Position: Fullback / Wing
Youth career
- -: SC Pamiers
- –: Toulouse
Senior career
Years	Team	Apps	(Points)
2005–2008	Toulouse	7	(0)
2008–2010	Agen	53	(80)
2010–2012	Bayonne	36	(85)
2012–2021	Toulouse	163	(295)
International career
Years	Team	Apps	(Points)
2010–2019	France	62	(70)

Yoann Huget ([jo.an y.ʒe]; born 2 June 1987) is a former French rugby union player. He played as a wing or fullback.

== Career ==
=== Club ===
He started his rugby career playing for Stade Toulousain in the 2005–06 Top 14 season. He scored his first try in November 2006 against CA Brive. He joined SU Agen in the 2008–09 Rugby Pro D2 competition. He scored 14 tries for Agen in that season and was the top try-scorer of the season. He played a few more games the following season before signing up with the Top 14 side, Bayonne. He returned to Stade Toulousain at the beginning of the 2012–13 Top 14 season.

=== International ===
After having an impressive start in the 2010–11 Top 14 season, he was selected into the France national rugby team for the 2010 end of year rugby tests. He made his international debut for France on 20 November 2010 against Argentina on the right wing. He was initially selected in France's provisional squad for the 2011 Rugby World Cup but had to withdraw after missing a number of doping tests. He was selected for the 2015 Rugby World Cup but picked up a cruciate ligament injury in the first game against Italy and was replaced in the squad by Rémy Grosso.

== International ==
=== International tries ===
International tries
No.	Date	Venue	Opponent	Score	Result	Competition
1	23 June 2012	Estadio José Fierro, Tucumán, Argentina	Argentina	3–21	10–49	2012 France tour of Argentina
2	23 June 2012	Estadio José Fierro, Tucumán, Argentina	Argentina	3–42	10–49	2012 France tour of Argentina
3	23 November 2013	Stade de France, Saint-Denis, France	South Africa	5–13	10–19	2013 Autumn Internationals
4	1 February 2014	Stade de France, Saint-Denis, France	England	5–0	26–24	2014 Six Nations
5	1 February 2014	Stade de France, Saint-Denis, France	England	13–3	26–24	2014 Six Nations
6	8 March 2014	Murrayfield Stadium, Edinburgh, Scotland	Scotland	14–14	17–19	2014 Six Nations
7	22 August 2015	Stade de France, Saint-Denis, France	England	20–6	25–20	2015 Rugby World Cup warm-up
8	12 November 2016	Stadium Municipal, Toulouse, France	Samoa	16–3	52–8	2016 Autumn Internationals
9	1 February 2019	Stade de France, Saint-Denis, France	Wales	10–0	19–24	2019 Six Nations
10	23 February 2019	Stade de France, Saint-Denis, France	Scotland	15–3	27–10	2019 Six Nations
11	10 March 2019	Aviva Stadium, Dublin, Ireland	Ireland	26–5	26–14	2019 Six Nations
12	16 March 2019	Stadio Olimpico, Rome, Italy	Italy	15–9	25–14	2019 Six Nations
13	30 August 2019	Stade de France, Saint-Denis, France	Italy	5–0	47–19	2019 Rugby World Cup warm-up
14	2 October 2019	Fukuoka Hakatanomori Stadium, Fukuoka, Japan	United States	5–0	33–9	2019 Rugby World Cup

== Honours ==
=== Club ===
(France) Toulouse

- Top 14 (2): 2007–08, 2018–19
