= Demba Bamba =

France international rugby union player

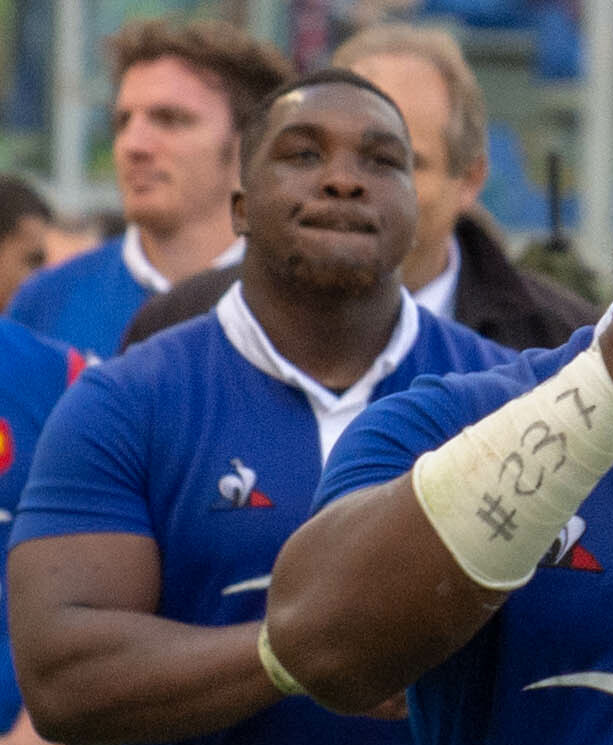
- Bamba with France in 2019
- Born: 17 March 1998 (age 28) Saint-Denis, France
- Height: 1.85 m (6 ft 1 in)
- Weight: 125 kg (19 st 10 lb; 276 lb)

Rugby union career
- Position: Prop
- Current team: Racing 92
Youth career
- 2013–2014: Saint-Denis US
- 2014–2017: Brive
Senior career
Years	Team	Apps	(Points)
2017–2019	Brive	27	(10)
2019–2024	Lyon	79	(20)
2024–	Racing 92	0	(0)
- Correct as of 8 September 2024
International career
Years	Team	Apps	(Points)
2018	France U20	8	(5)
2018–	France	31	(0)
- Correct as of 14 March 2026

Demba Bamba (born 17 March 1998) is a French rugby union player. His position is prop and he currently plays for Racing 92 in the Top 14.

== Early life and education ==
Demba's parents originate from Mauritania and he grew up in the Saint-Denis area of Paris. He played various sports, including handball, when young.

== Playing career ==
Demba played for the 2018 France U-20 side that won the U-20 World Cup.

He was selected for the French squad for the 2 February 2020 game against England in the 2020 Six Nations.

He came on as a substitute in the 2020 Six Nations game against Wales on 22 February 2020.

== Honours ==
=== Lyon ===
- EPCR Challenge Cup: 2021–22

=== France ===
- 2x Six Nations Championship: 2022, 2026

=== France U20 ===
- Six Nations Under 20s Championship: 2018
- World Rugby Under 20 Championship: 2018
