= Simone Ferrari (rugby union) =

Italy international rugby union player

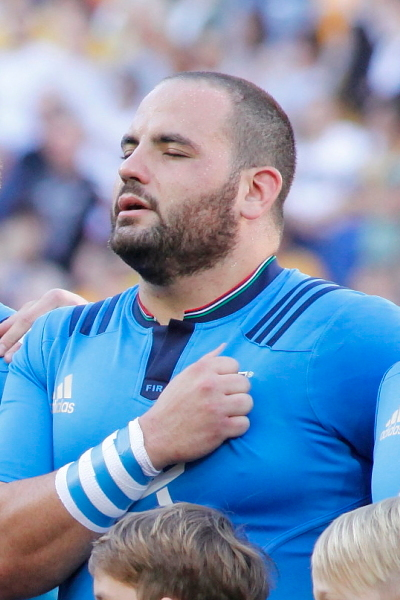
- Ferrari representing Italy during their test series against Australia, June 2017
- Full name: Simone Pietro Ferrari
- Born: 28 March 1994 (age 32) Cernusco sul Naviglio, Italy
- Height: 184 cm (6 ft 0 in)
- Weight: 120 kg (265 lb; 18 st 13 lb)

Rugby union career
- Position: Prop
- Current team: Benetton
Senior career
| Years | Team | Apps | (Points) |
| 2013−2014 | Mogliano | 19 | (0) |
| 2015− | Benetton | 135 | (10) |
- Correct as of 29 Aug 2026
International career
| Years | Team | Apps | (Points) |
| 2013−2014 | Italy U20 | 12 | (0) |
| 2016– | Italy | 73 | (10) |
- Correct as of 29 Aug 2026

Simone Pietro Ferrari (born 28 March 1994) is an Italian professional rugby union player who primarily plays prop for Benetton of the United Rugby Championship. He has also represented Italy at international level, having made his test debut against South Africa during the 2021 Autumn Nations Series. Ferrari has previously played for clubs such as Mogliano in the past.

== Professional career ==
In 2013 and 2014, Ferrari was named in the Italy Under 20 squad and from 2016 he was named in the Italy squad. On 18 August 2019, he was named in the final 31-man squad for the 2019 Rugby World Cup. On 22 August 2023, he was named in the Italy's 33-man squad for the 2023 Rugby World Cup. He played his 50th test against France on 6 October 2023 in the 2023 Rugby World Cup.
