= Luca Morisi =

Italy international rugby union player

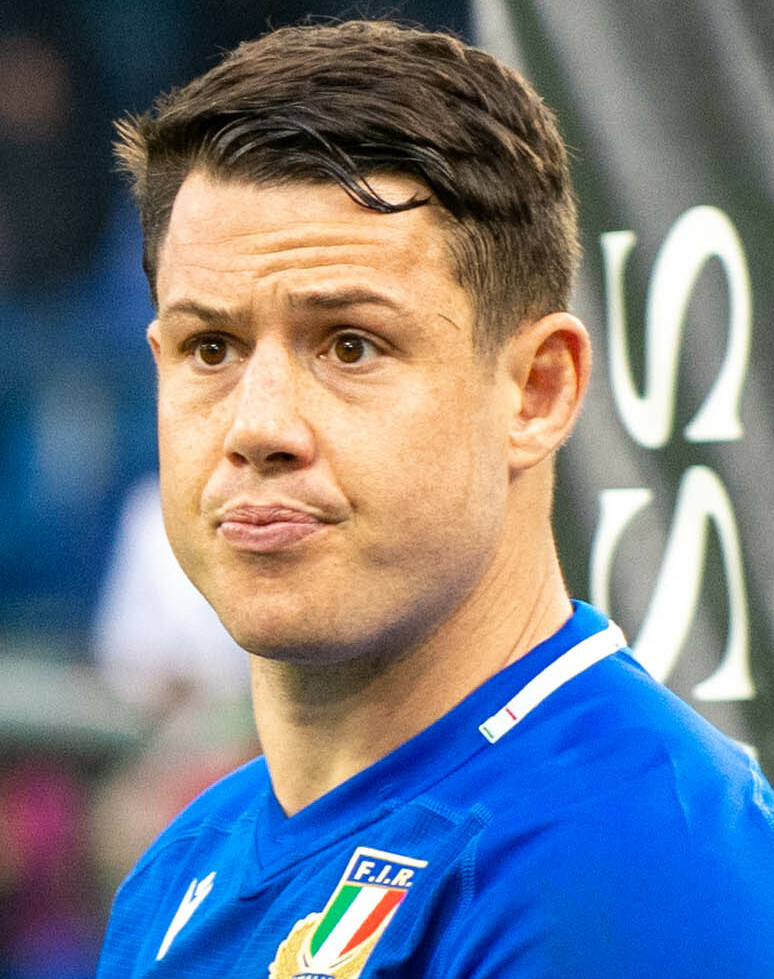
- Morisi in 2023
- Full name: Luca Enrico Roberto Morisi
- Born: 22 February 1991 (age 35) Milan, Italy
- Height: 183 cm (6 ft 0 in)
- Weight: 95 kg (209 lb; 14 st 13 lb)

Rugby union career
- Position: Centre
- Current team: Zebre Parma
Youth career
- 1998–2010: Rugby Grande Milano
Senior career
Years	Team	Apps	(Points)
2010–2011	Milano	12	(40)
2011–2012	Crociati	16	(3)
2011–2012	→Benetton	6	(5)
2012–2022	Benetton	85	(25)
2022–2023	London Irish	16	(0)
2023–2026	Zebre Parma	36	(5)
- Correct as of 2 Jun 2025
International career
Years	Team	Apps	(Points)
2010–2011	Italy U20	8	(0)
2012–	Italy	50	(25)
- Correct as of 6 Oct 2023

Luca Enrico Roberto Morisi (Italian pronunciation: [moˈriːzi]; born 22 February 1991) is an Italian professional rugby union player who primarily plays centre for Zebre Parma of the United Rugby Championship.

== Professional career ==
He has also represented Italy at international level, having made his test debut against England during the 2012 Six Nations Championship. Morisi has previously played for clubs such as Milano, Benetton, and Crociati in the past.

Morisi participated in eleven seasons for Benetton Treviso between 2011 and 2022, the first of which he spent as a permit player under contract with Crociati. He was selected in the Italy under-20 team from 2009 to 2011. Morisi received a call-up to the Italian squad in January 2012 in preparation for the Six Nations Championship. He joined Benetton Treviso in 2012 and was included in the final 31-man roster for the 2019 Rugby World Cup on 18 August 2019. In 2022−23 season, he played for London Irish in the English Premiership, until the collapse of the team.

On 22 August 2023, he was named in the Italy's 33-man squad for the 2023 Rugby World Cup.
