= Félix Lambey =

French rugby union footballer

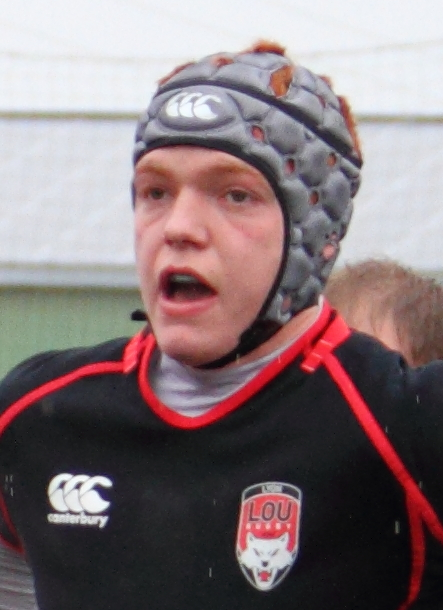
- Born: 15 March 1994 (age 32) Lons-le-Saunier, France
- Height: 1.95 m (6 ft 5 in)
- Weight: 106 kg (16 st 10 lb)

Rugby union career
- Position: Lock
- Current team: Lyon
Senior career
Years	Team	Apps	(Points)
2014–	Lyon	109	(15)
2015–2016	→ Béziers (loan)	28	(10)
- Correct as of 1 March 2022
International career
Years	Team	Apps	(Points)
2018–	France	10	(0)
- Correct as of 30 August 2019

Félix Lambey (born 15 March 1994) is a French rugby union lock who currently plays for Lyon and France.

== International career ==
Lambey was called up to the French national team for the first time ahead of France's opening 2018 Six Nations Championship match against Ireland.
