= 2018 June rugby union tests =

The 2018 mid-year rugby union internationals (also known as the summer internationals in the Northern Hemisphere) are international rugby union matches that are mostly played in the Southern Hemisphere during the June international window.

The matches are part of World Rugby's global rugby calendar (2012–19) that includes test matches between touring Northern Hemisphere nations and home Southern Hemisphere nations. In addition, the global calendar gives Tier 2 nations the opportunity to play Tier 1 nations outside the November International Window, increasing competitiveness from the Tier 2 sides ahead of the 2019 Rugby World Cup.

== Series ==
Series	Result	Winner
New Zealand–France Test series	3–0	New Zealand
Australia–Ireland Test series	2–1	Ireland
Argentina–Wales Test series	2–0	Wales
South Africa–England Test series	2–1	South Africa
Japan–Italy Test series	1–1	drawn

== Fixtures ==
=== 27 May ===
27 May 2018
15:00 BST (UTC+01)

England	45–63	Barbarians
Try: Daly 16' c Francis (2) 20' c, 30' c Mercer 27' c Launchbury 55' c May 76' c Con: Ford (6/6) 18', 20', 28', 31', 55', 76'; Pen: Ford (1/1) 48'	Report	Try: Ashton (3) 3' c, 6' c, 24' c Vito (2) 11' c, 79' c Russell 38' c Radradra 43' c Timani 59' c Laidlaw 71' c Con: Russell (7/7) 3', 7', 12', 26', 40', 44', 59'; Laidlaw (1/1) 72'; Fernández Lobbe (1/1) 80'

Twickenham Stadium, London
Attendance: 51,636
Referee: Mathieu Raynal (France)

Team details

FB	15	Elliot Daly
RW	14	Jonny May
OC	13	Henry Trinder	(substituted off) 26'
IC	12	Piers Francis
LW	11	Mike Brown	(substituted off) 49'
FH	10	George Ford
SH	9	Ben Youngs	(substituted off) 61'
N8	8	Zach Mercer	(substituted off) 46'
OF	7	Tom Curry
BF	6	Chris Robshaw (c)
RL	5	Joe Launchbury
LL	4	Elliott Stooke	(substituted off) 59'
TP	3	Kyle Sinckler	(substituted off) 61'
HK	2	Jack Singleton	(substituted off) 70'
LP	1	Joe Marler	(substituted off) 46'
Replacements:
HK	16	George McGuigan	(substituted on) 70'
PR	17	Ellis Genge	(substituted on) 46'
PR	18	Nick Schonert	(substituted on) 61'
LK	19	Josh Beaumont	(substituted on) 59'
FL	20	Mark Wilson	(substituted on) 46'
SH	21	Dan Robson	(substituted on) 61'
FH	22	Danny Cipriani	(substituted on) 26'
WG	23	Denny Solomona	(substituted on) 49'
Coach:
(Australia) Eddie Jones

FB	15	(England) Chris Ashton
RW	14	(Fiji) Josua Tuisova
OC	13	(Fiji) Semi Radradra
IC	12	(Fiji) Josh Matavesi	(substituted off) 53'
LW	11	(Ireland) Niyi Adeolokun
FH	10	(Scotland) Finn Russell	(substituted off) 68'
SH	9	(Wales) Rhodri Williams	(substituted off) 60'
N8	8	(New Zealand) Victor Vito
OF	7	(Wales) Justin Tipuric
BF	6	(Argentina) Juan Martín Fernández Lobbe (c)	(substituted off) 52'
RL	5	(Australia) Sitaleki Timani	(substituted off) 60'
LL	4	(Ireland) Ultan Dillane
TP	3	(New Zealand) John Afoa	(substituted off) 65'
HK	2	(France) Benjamin Kayser	(substituted off) 56'
LP	1	(Ireland) Denis Buckley	(substituted off) 47'
Replacements:
HK	16	(Australia) Tatafu Polota-Nau	(substituted on) 56'
PR	17	(New Zealand) Loni Uhila	(substituted on) 47'
PR	18	(Argentina) Ramiro Herrera	(substituted on) 65'
LK	19	(Samoa) Joe Tekori	(substituted on) 60'
N8	20	(Tonga) Nili Latu	(substituted on) 52'
SH	21	(Scotland) Greig Laidlaw	(substituted on) 60'
FH	22	(New Zealand) Luke McAlister	(substituted on) 68'
WG	23	(New Zealand) Malakai Fekitoa	(substituted on) 53'
Coach:
(Samoa) Pat Lam

Man of the Match:
Semi Radradra (Barbarians)

Touch judges:
Nigel Owens (Wales)
Ben Whitehouse (Wales)
Television match official:
Brian MacNeice (Ireland)

Notes:

- This is the first time since 2014 the Barbarians had defeated England.

=== 31 May ===
31 May 2018
20:00 GET (UTC+4)

Georgia	16–15	French Barbarians
Try: Matiashvili 50' m Todua 75' m Pen: Matiashvili (2/2) 19', 23'	Match sheet	Try: Placines 37' c Muscarditz 80' m Con: Mathy (1/2) 39'; Pen: Mathy (1/1) 63'

Boris Paichadze Dinamo Arena, Tbilisi
Attendance: 30,000
Referee: Christophe Ridley (England)

Team details

FB	15	Merab Kvirikashvili	(substituted off) 49'
RW	14	Soso Matiashvili
OC	13	Giorgi Kveseladze
IC	12	Tamaz Mchedlidze
LW	11	Anzor Sitchinava	(substituted off) 59'
FH	10	Revaz Jinchvelashvili	(substituted off) 66'
SH	9	Vasil Lobzhanidze	(substituted off) 49'
N8	8	Mikheil Gachechiladze	(substituted off) 40'
OF	7	Guram Shengelia
BF	6	Giorgi Tsutskiridze	(substituted off) 61'
RL	5	Giorgi Nemsadze (c)	(substituted off) 40'
LL	4	Otar Giorgadze
TP	3	Giorgi Melikidze	(substituted off) 40'
HK	2	Shalva Mamukashvili	(substituted off) 40'
LP	1	Giorgi Tetrashvili	(substituted off) 40'
Replacements:
HK	16	Giorgi Chkoidze	(substituted on) 40'
PR	17	Zurab Zhvania	(substituted on) 40'
PR	18	Irakli Mirtskhulava	(substituted on) 40'
LK	19	Nodar Tcheishvili	(substituted on) 40'
LK	20	Shalva Sutiashvili	(substituted on) 40'
SH	21	Vazha Khutsishvili	(substituted on) 49'
FH	22	Lasha Khmaladze	(substituted on) 66'
WG	23	Alexander Todua	(substituted on) 59'
FL	24	Saba Shubitidze	(substituted on) 61'
FB	25	Beka Tsiklauri	(substituted on) 49'
Coach:
(New Zealand) Milton Haig

FB	15	(France) Yoann Laousse Azpiazu		(substituted off) 67'
RW	14	(France) Bastien Guillemin
OC	13	(France) Olivier Klemenczak		(substituted off) 67'
IC	12	(France) Dorian Laborde	(substituted off) 40'	(substituted on) 67'
LW	11	(France) Kylan Hamdaoui
FH	10	(France) Maxime Mathy	(substituted off) 40'	(substituted on) 67'
SH	9	(France) Tom Ecochard	(substituted off) 40'
N8	8	(France) Hugo Fabregues		(substituted off) 59'
OF	7	(France) Alan Brazo
BF	6	(France) Alban Placines	(substituted off) 40'	(substituted on) 59'
RL	5	(France) Maxime Granouillet	(substituted off) 40'	(substituted on) 59'
LL	4	(France) Hans Nkinsi		(substituted off) 59'
TP	3	(France) Walter Desmaison	(substituted off) 40'
HK	2	(France) Christophe David (c)	(substituted off) 40'
LP	1	(France) Enzo Forletta	(substituted off) 40'
Replacements:
HK	16	(France) Raphael Carbou	(substituted on) 40'
PR	17	(France) Malino Vanai	(substituted on) 40'
LK	18	(France) Jean-Baptiste Singer	(substituted on) 40'
FL	19	(France) Nicolas Garrault	(substituted on) 40'
SH	20	(France) Julien Blanc	(substituted on) 40'
FB	21	(France) Jerome Bosviel	(substituted on) 40'
CE	22	(France) Peyo Muscarditz	(substituted on) 40'
PR	23	(France) Blaise Dumas	(substituted on) 40'
Coach:
(France) David Auradou (France) Christophe Laussucq

Touch judges:
Nika Amashukeli (Georgia)
Saba Abulashvili (Georgia)

=== 2 June ===
2 June 2018
17:00 EDT (UTC-4)

South Africa	20–22	Wales
Try: Ismaiel 43' c Mapimpi 58' c Con: Jantjies (2/2) 44', 59'; Pen: Jantjies (1/1) 18'; R. du Preez (1/1) 73'	Report	Try: Amos 30' c Williams 33' c Elias 74' m Con: Anscombe (2/3) 31', 35'; Pen: Anscombe (1/3) 47'

Robert F. Kennedy Memorial Stadium, Washington, D.C., United States
Attendance: 21,357
Referee: Matthew Carley (England)

Team details

FB	15	Curwin Bosch	(substituted off) 31'	(substituted on) 40'	(substituted off) 49'
RW	14	Travis Ismaiel
OC	13	Jesse Kriel
IC	12	André Esterhuizen
LW	11	Makazole Mapimpi	(substituted off) 76'
FH	10	Elton Jantjies	(substituted off) 71'
SH	9	Ivan van Zyl
N8	8	Dan du Preez			(substituted off) 53'
OF	7	Oupa Mohojé
BF	6	Kwagga Smith	10' to 19'
RL	5	Pieter-Steph du Toit (c)
LL	4	Jason Jenkins	(substituted off) 61'
TP	3	Wilco Louw	(substituted off) 44'
HK	2	Chiliboy Ralepelle	(substituted off) 52'
LP	1	Ox Nché	(substituted off) 44'
Replacements:
HK	16	Akker van der Merwe	(substituted on) 52'
PR	17	Steven Kitshoff	(substituted on) 44'
PR	18	Thomas du Toit	(substituted on) 44'
LK	19	Marvin Orie	(substituted on) 61'
FL	20	Sikhumbuzo Notshe	(substituted on) 10'	(substituted off) 19'	(substituted on) 53'
SH	21	Embrose Papier	(substituted on) 76'
FH	22	Robert du Preez	(substituted on) 61'
WG	23	Warrick Gelant	(substituted on) 31'	(substituted off) 40'	(substituted on) 49'
Coach:
(South Africa) Rassie Erasmus

FB	15	Hallam Amos
RW	14	Tom Prydie
OC	13	George North
IC	12	Owen Watkin	(yellow card) 56' to 66'
LW	11	Steff Evans		(substituted off) 29'
FH	10	Gareth Anscombe
SH	9	Tomos Williams		(substituted off) 78'
N8	8	Ross Moriarty
OF	7	Ellis Jenkins (c)
BF	6	Seb Davies
RL	5	Cory Hill
LL	4	Bradley Davies
TP	3	Dillon Lewis		(substituted off) 52'
HK	2	Elliot Dee		(substituted off) 70'
LP	1	Nicky Smith		(substituted off) 48'
Replacements:
HK	16	Ryan Elias		(substituted on) 70'
PR	17	Wyn Jones		(substituted on) 48'
PR	18	Rhodri Jones		(substituted on) 52'
LK	19	Adam Beard
FL	20	Aaron Wainwright
SH	21	Aled Davies		(substituted on) 78'
FH	22	Rhys Patchell
CE	23	Hadleigh Parkes		(substituted on) 29'
Coach:
(New Zealand) Warren Gatland

Man of the Match:
Ellis Jenkins (Wales)

Touch judges:
Alexandre Ruiz (France)
Frank Murphy (Ireland)
Television match official:
David Grashoff (England)

Notes:

- Tomos Williams (Wales) and Robert du Preez, Thomas du Toit, André Esterhuizen, Travis Ismaiel, Jason Jenkins, Makazole Mapimpi, Ox Nché, Sikhumbuzo Notshe, Marvin Orie, Embrose Papier, Kwagga Smith, Akker van der Merwe and Ivan van Zyl (all South Africa) made their international debuts.
- This victory saw Wales record a record third consecutive win against the Springboks.

=== 9 June ===
9 June 2018
14:45 JST (UTC+09)

Japan	34–17	Italy
Try: Mafi 17' c Fukuoka 27' c Lemeki 60' c Matsushima 65' c Con: Tamura (4/4) 19', 29', 62', 67'; Pen: Tamura (2/3) 33', 57'		Try: Pasquali 14' c Steyn 35' c Con: Allan (2/2) 16', 37'; Pen: Allan (1/1) 51'

Oita Bank Dome, Oita
Attendance: 25,824
Referee: Nic Berry (Australia)

Team details

FB	15	Kotaro Matsushima
RW	14	Lomano Lemeki
OC	13	Will Tupou	(substituted off) 77'
IC	12	Timothy Lafaele
LW	11	Kenki Fukuoka
FH	10	Yu Tamura	(substituted off) 77'
SH	9	Fumiaki Tanaka	(substituted off) 47'
N8	8	Amanaki Mafi	(substituted off) 74'
OF	7	Michael Leitch (c)
BF	6	Kazuki Himeno
RL	5	Samuela Anise
LL	4	Wimpie van der Walt	(substituted off) 52'
TP	3	Koo Ji-won	(substituted off) 59'
HK	2	Shota Horie	(substituted off) 77'
LP	1	Keita Inagaki	(substituted off) 77'
Replacements:
HK	16	Yusuke Niwai	(substituted on) 77'
PR	17	Shintaro Ishihara	(substituted on) 77'
PR	18	Takuma Asahara	(substituted on) 59'
LK	19	Uwe Helu	(substituted on) 52'
FL	20	Yoshitaka Tokunaga	(substituted on) 74'
SH	21	Yutaka Nagare	(substituted on) 47'
FH	22	Rikiya Matsuda	(substituted on) 77'
CE	23	Ryoto Nakamura	(substituted on) 77'
Coach:
(New Zealand) Jamie Joseph

FB	15	Matteo Minozzi
RW	14	Tommaso Benvenuti
OC	13	Michele Campagnaro
IC	12	Tommaso Castello
LW	11	Mattia Bellini	(substituted off) 40'
FH	10	Tommaso Allan
SH	9	Marcello Violi	(substituted off) 64'
N8	8	Braam Steyn
OF	7	Giovanni Licata	(substituted off) 48'
BF	6	Sebastian Negri
RL	5	Dean Budd	(substituted off) 47'
LL	4	Alessandro Zanni	(substituted off) 68'
TP	3	Tiziano Pasquali	(substituted off) 59'
HK	2	Leonardo Ghiraldini (c)	(substituted off) 59'
LP	1	Andrea Lovotti	(substituted off) 47'
Replacements:
HK	16	Luca Bigi	(substituted on) 59'
PR	17	Federico Zani	(substituted on) 47'
PR	18	Giosuè Zilocchi	(substituted on) 59'
LK	19	George Biagi	(substituted on) 47'
LK	20	Marco Fuser	(substituted on) 68'
FL	21	Jake Polledri	(substituted on) 48'
SH	22	Tito Tebaldi	(substituted on) 64'
FB	23	Jayden Hayward	(substituted on) 40'
Coach:
(Ireland) Conor O'Shea

Touch judges:
Nigel Owens (Wales)
Nick Briant (New Zealand)
Television match official:
Rowan Kitt (England)

Notes:

- This is Japan's biggest winning margin over a Tier 1 Nation, surpassing the 15-point difference set in 1998 and 2013 with wins over Argentina and Wales.
- Giosuè Zilocchi (Italy) made his international debut.

9 June 2018
19:35 NZST (UTC+12)

New Zealand	52–11	France
Try: B. Barrett 21' m Taylor 52' c B. Smith 55' c Ioane (2) 61' m, 74' m McKenzie 63' m Laumape 66' m Savea 78' c Con: B. Barrett (3/8) 54', 57', 80'; Pen: B. Barrett (2/3) 13', 47'	Report	Try: Grosso 6' m Pen: Parra (2/3) 19', 35'

Eden Park, Auckland
Attendance: 45,850
Referee: Luke Pearce (England)

Team details

FB	15	Jordie Barrett	(substituted off) 60'
RW	14	Ben Smith
OC	13	Anton Lienert-Brown
IC	12	Ryan Crotty	(substituted off) 60'
LW	11	Rieko Ioane
FH	10	Beauden Barrett
SH	9	Aaron Smith	(substituted off) 65'
N8	8	Luke Whitelock	(substituted off) 72'
OF	7	Sam Cane	(substituted off) 63'	(substituted on) 72'	(substituted off) 74'
BF	6	Liam Squire
RL	5	Scott Barrett
LL	4	Sam Whitelock (c)
TP	3	Owen Franks	(substituted off) 57'
HK	2	Codie Taylor	(substituted off) 65'
LP	1	Joe Moody	(substituted off) 45'
Replacements:
HK	16	Nathan Harris	(substituted on) 65'
PR	17	Karl Tu’inukuafe	(substituted on) 45'
PR	18	Ofa Tu'ungafasi	(substituted on) 57'
FL	19	Vaea Fifita	(substituted on) 72'
FL	20	Ardie Savea	(substituted on) 63'	(substituted off) 72'	(substituted on) 74'
SH	21	TJ Perenara	(substituted on) 65'
FH	22	Damian McKenzie	(substituted on) 60'
CE	23	Ngani Laumape	(substituted on) 60'
Coach:
(New Zealand) Steve Hansen

FB	15	Maxime Médard
RW	14	Teddy Thomas
OC	13	Mathieu Bastareaud (c)
IC	12	Geoffrey Doumayrou
LW	11	Rémy Grosso		(substituted off) 58'
FH	10	Anthony Belleau		(substituted off) 60'
SH	9	Morgan Parra		(substituted off) 60'
N8	8	Fabien Sanconnie
OF	7	Kevin Gourdon
BF	6	Judicaël Cancoriet		(substituted off) 60'
RL	5	Yoann Maestri
LL	4	Paul Gabrillagues	(yellow card) 50' to 60'	(substituted off) 68'
TP	3	Uini Atonio		(substituted off) 43'
HK	2	Camille Chat		(substituted off) 60'
LP	1	Dany Priso		(substituted off) 54'
Replacements:
HK	16	Adrien Pélissié		(substituted on) 60'
PR	17	Cyril Baille		(substituted on) 54'
PR	18	Rabah Slimani		(substituted on) 43'
FL	19	Bernard Le Roux		(substituted on) 68'
FL	20	Alexandre Lapandry		(substituted on) 60'
SH	21	Baptiste Serin		(substituted on) 60'
FH	22	Jules Plisson		(substituted on) 60'
CE	23	Gaël Fickou		(substituted on) 58'
Coach:
(France) Jacques Brunel

Man of the Match:
Codie Taylor (New Zealand)

Touch judges:
Angus Gardner (Australia)
John Lacey (Ireland)
Television match official:
George Ayoub (Australia)

Notes:

- Karl Tu’inukuafe (New Zealand) made his international debut.
- Beauden Barrett, Jordie Barrett and Scott Barrett became the first trio of brothers to start in an All Blacks XV.

9 June 2018
20:00 AEST (UTC+10)

Australia	18–9	Ireland
Try: Foley 33' m Pocock 71' c Con: Foley (1/2) 73'; Pen: Foley (2/2) 2', 69'	Report	Pen: Carbery (3/4) 13', 25', 55'

Lang Park, Brisbane
Attendance: 46,273
Referee: Marius van der Westhuizen (South Africa)

Team details

FB	15	Israel Folau
RW	14	Dane Haylett-Petty	(substituted off) 62'
OC	13	Samu Kerevi
IC	12	Kurtley Beale
LW	11	Marika Koroibete
FH	10	Bernard Foley
SH	9	Will Genia	(substituted off) 73'
N8	8	Caleb Timu	(substituted off) 48'	(substituted off) 58'	(substituted off) 62'
OF	7	Michael Hooper (c)
BF	6	David Pocock	(substituted off) 73'
RL	5	Adam Coleman
LL	4	Izack Rodda	(substituted off) 54'
TP	3	Sekope Kepu	(substituted off) 55'
HK	2	Brandon Paenga-Amosa	(substituted off) 55'
LP	1	Scott Sio	(substituted off) 62'
Replacements:
HK	16	Tolu Latu	(substituted on) 55'
PR	17	Tom Robertson	(substituted on) 62'
PR	18	Taniela Tupou	(substituted on) 55'
LK	19	Rob Simmons	(substituted on) 54'
LK	20	Lukhan Tui	(substituted on) 73'
FL	21	Pete Samu	(substituted on) 48'	(substituted off) 58'	(substituted on) 62'
SH	22	Nick Phipps	(substituted on) 73'
WG	23	Reece Hodge	(substituted on) 62'
Coach:
(Australia) Michael Cheika

FB	15	Rob Kearney
RW	14	Keith Earls	(substituted off) 24'
OC	13	Robbie Henshaw
IC	12	Bundee Aki
LW	11	Jacob Stockdale
FH	10	Joey Carbery	(substituted off) 56'
SH	9	Conor Murray	(substituted off) 77'
N8	8	CJ Stander
OF	7	Jordi Murphy
BF	6	Peter O'Mahony (c)	(substituted off) 68'
RL	5	Iain Henderson	(substituted off) 64'
LL	4	James Ryan
TP	3	John Ryan	(substituted off) 47'
HK	2	Rob Herring	(substituted off) 56'
LP	1	Jack McGrath	(substituted off) 47'
Replacements:
HK	16	Seán Cronin	(substituted on) 56'
PR	17	Cian Healy	(substituted on) 47'
PR	18	Tadhg Furlong	(substituted on) 47'
LK	19	Quinn Roux	(substituted on) 64'
N8	20	Jack Conan	(substituted on) 68'
SH	21	Kieran Marmion	(substituted on) 77'
FH	22	Johnny Sexton	(substituted on) 56'
FB	23	Jordan Larmour	(substituted on) 24'
Coach:
(New Zealand) Joe Schmidt

Man of the Match:
David Pocock (Australia)

Touch judges:
Pascal Gaüzère (France)
Paul Williams (New Zealand)
Television match official:
Ben Skeen (New Zealand)

Notes:

- Brandon Paenga-Amosa, Pete Samu and Caleb Timu (all Australia) made their international debuts.

9 June 2018
17:05 SAST (UTC+02)

South Africa	42–39	England
Try: De Klerk 19' m Nkosi (2) 29' c, 33' c Le Roux 38' c Dyantyi 64' c Con: Pollard (4/5) 30', 34', 39', 65'; Pen: Pollard (3/5) 10', 51', 75'	Report	Try: Brown 3' c Daly 12' c Farrell 16' c Itoje 69' m May 77' c Con: Farrell (4/5) 4', 14', 17', 77'; Pen: Daly (1/1) 1'; Farrell (1/1) 40'

Ellis Park Stadium, Johannesburg
Attendance: 55,260
Referee: Ben O'Keeffe (New Zealand)

Team details

FB	15	Willie le Roux	(substituted off) 63'
RW	14	Sbu Nkosi
OC	13	Lukhanyo Am
IC	12	Damian de Allende	(substituted off) 73'
LW	11	Aphiwe Dyantyi
FH	10	Handré Pollard
SH	9	Faf de Klerk	(substituted off) 72'
N8	8	Duane Vermeulen
OF	7	Jean-Luc du Preez	(substituted off) 49'
BF	6	Siya Kolisi (c)	(substituted off) 70'
RL	5	Franco Mostert
LL	4	RG Snyman
TP	3	Wilco Louw	(substituted off) 47'
HK	2	Bongi Mbonambi	(substituted off) 57'
LP	1	Tendai Mtawarira	(substituted off) 47'
Replacements:
HK	16	Akker van der Merwe	(substituted on) 57'
PR	17	Steven Kitshoff	(substituted on) 47'
PR	18	Thomas du Toit	(substituted on) 47'
LK	19	Pieter-Steph du Toit	(substituted on) 49'
FL	20	Sikhumbuzo Notshe	(substituted on) 70'
SH	21	Ivan van Zyl	(substituted on) 72'
FH	22	Elton Jantjies	(substituted on) 73'
WG	23	Warrick Gelant	(substituted on) 63'
Coach:
(South Africa) Rassie Erasmus

FB	15	Elliot Daly
RW	14	Jonny May
OC	13	Henry Slade
IC	12	Owen Farrell (c)
LW	11	Mike Brown		(substituted off) 75'
FH	10	George Ford		(substituted off) 75'
SH	9	Ben Youngs		(substituted off) 75'
N8	8	Billy Vunipola
OF	7	Tom Curry		(substituted off) 65'
BF	6	Chris Robshaw
RL	5	Nick Isiekwe		(substituted off) 35'
LL	4	Maro Itoje
TP	3	Kyle Sinckler		(substituted off) 57'
HK	2	Jamie George		(substituted off) 63'
LP	1	Mako Vunipola	(yellow card) 62' to 72'	(substituted off) 75'
Replacements:
HK	16	Luke Cowan-Dickie		(substituted on) 63'
PR	17	Joe Marler		(substituted on) 75'
PR	18	Harry Williams		(substituted on) 57'
FL	19	Brad Shields		(substituted on) 35'
N8	20	Nathan Hughes		(substituted on) 65'
SH	21	Ben Spencer		(substituted on) 75'
FH	22	Piers Francis		(substituted on) 75'
WG	23	Denny Solomona		(substituted on) 75'
Coach:
(Australia) Eddie Jones

Man of the Match:
Faf de Klerk (South Africa)

Touch judges:
Romain Poite (France)
Glen Jackson (New Zealand)
Television match official:
Simon McDowell (Ireland)

Notes:

- Aphiwe Dyantyi, Sbu Nkosi and RG Snyman (all South Africa) and Brad Shields and Ben Spencer (both England) made their international debuts.
- Siya Kolisi became the first non-white South African captain.
- Mako Vunipola (England) earned his 50th test cap.

9 June 2018
16:40 ART (UTC-03)

Argentina	10–23	Wales
Try: Lezana 77' c Con: González Iglesias (1/1) 77'; Pen: Sánchez (1/1) 1'		Try: J. Davies 7' c North 26' c Con: Patchell (2/2) 8', 27'; Pen: Patchell (2/3) 35', 44'; Anscombe (1/1) 80'

Estadio San Juan del Bicentenario, San Juan
Attendance: 23,200
Referee: Andrew Brace (Ireland)

Team details

FB	15	Emiliano Boffelli
RW	14	Bautista Delguy	(substituted off) 53'
OC	13	Matías Orlando
IC	12	Jerónimo de la Fuente
LW	11	Ramiro Moyano
FH	10	Nicolás Sánchez	(substituted off) 40'
SH	9	Gonzalo Bertranou	(substituted off) 47'
N8	8	Javier Ortega Desio
OF	7	Marcos Kremer
BF	6	Pablo Matera	(substituted off) 46'
RL	5	Tomás Lavanini	(substituted off) 67'
LL	4	Guido Petti
TP	3	Nahuel Tetaz Chaparro	(substituted off) 64'
HK	2	Agustín Creevy (c)	(substituted off) 64'
LP	1	Santiago García Botta	55' to 57'		(substituted off) 59'
Replacements:
HK	16	Julián Montoya	(substituted on) 64'
PR	17	Javier Díaz	(substituted on) 55'	(substituted off) 57'	(substituted on) 59'
PR	18	Santiago Medrano	(substituted on) 64'
LK	19	Matías Alemanno	(substituted on) 67'
FL	20	Tomás Lezana	(substituted on) 46'
SH	21	Martín Landajo	(substituted on) 47'
FH	22	Santiago González Iglesias	(substituted on) 40'
WG	23	Sebastián Cancelliere	(substituted on) 53'
Coach:
(Argentina) Daniel Hourcade

FB	15	Hallam Amos
RW	14	Josh Adams
OC	13	Scott Williams
IC	12	Hadleigh Parkes
LW	11	George North
FH	10	Rhys Patchell	(substituted off) 59'
SH	9	Gareth Davies	(substituted off) 59'
N8	8	Ross Moriarty
OF	7	James Davies
BF	6	Seb Davies	(substituted off) 52'
RL	5	Cory Hill (c)	(substituted off) 67'
LL	4	Adam Beard
TP	3	Dillon Lewis	(substituted off) 52'
HK	2	Elliot Dee	(substituted off) 59'
LP	1	Rob Evans	(substituted off) 52'
Replacements:
HK	16	Ryan Elias	(substituted on) 59'
PR	17	Nicky Smith	(substituted on) 52'
PR	18	Tomas Francis	(substituted on) 52'
FL	19	Josh Turnbull	(substituted on) 67'
FL	20	Aaron Wainwright	(substituted on) 52'
SH	21	Aled Davies	(substituted on) 59'
FH	22	Gareth Anscombe	(substituted on) 59'
CE	23	Owen Watkin
Coach:
(New Zealand) Warren Gatland

Man of the Match:
James Davies (Wales)

Touch judges:
Jaco Peyper (South Africa)
Mathieu Raynal (France)
Television match official:
Marius Jonker (South Africa)

Notes:

- Javier Díaz, Bautista Delguy and Santiago Medrano (all Argentina) and Aaron Wainwright (Wales) made their international debuts.
- This is Wales' first victory over Argentina in Argentina since their 35–20 win in 2004.

9 June 2018
18:00 MDT (UTC-6)

United States	62–13	Russia
Try: Taufete'e (2) 10' m, 36' c Quill 18' c Lasike 22' c Brache (2) 38' m, 40' c Augspurger 70' c Dolan 75' c Scully 79' c Con: MacGinty (4/6) 19', 23', 37', 41'; Magie (3/3) 71', 76', 80'; Pen: MacGinty (1/1) 34'	Report	Try: Babaev 2' c Con: Kushnarev (1/1) 3'; Pen: Kushnarev (2/2) 15', 28'

Dick's Sporting Goods Park, Denver
Referee: Federico Anselmi (Argentina)

Team details

FB	15	Will Hooley
RW	14	Blaine Scully (c)
OC	13	Bryce Campbell
IC	12	Paul Lasike	(substituted off) 56'
LW	11	Marcel Brache
FH	10	AJ MacGinty	(substituted off) 56'
SH	9	Shaun Davies	(substituted off) 61'
N8	8	Cam Dolan
OF	7	Hanco Germishuys
BF	6	John Quill
RL	5	Nick Civetta
LL	4	Samu Manoa	(substituted off) 52'
TP	3	Paul Mullen	(substituted off) 63'
HK	2	Joe Taufete'e	(substituted off) 47'	(substituted on) 61'	(substituted off) 69'
LP	1	Eric Fry	(substituted off) 55'	(substituted on) 74'
Replacements:
HK	16	James Hilterbrand	(substituted on) 47'	(substituted off) 61'
PR	17	Olive Kilifi	(substituted on) 55'	(substituted off) 74'
PR	18	Chris Baumann	(substituted on) 63'
LK	19	Greg Peterson	(substituted on) 52'
LK	20	Ben Landry			(substituted on) 69'
SH	21	Nate Augspurger	(substituted on) 61'
FH	22	Will Magie	(substituted on) 56'
CE	23	Dylan Audsley	(substituted on) 56'
Coach:
(South Africa) Gary Gold

FB	15	Vasily Artemyev (c)	(substituted off) 37'	(substituted on) 40'
RW	14	Mikhail Babaev			(substituted off) 56'
OC	13	Dmitry Gerasimov
IC	12	Sergey Trishin	(substituted off) 48'
LW	11	Alexey Mikhaltsov
FH	10	Yuri Kushnarev	(substituted off) 74'
SH	9	Konstantin Uzunov	(substituted off) 61'
N8	8	Anton Rudoy
OF	7	Tagir Gadzhiev	(substituted off) 56'
BF	6	Nikita Vavilin
RL	5	Evgeny Elgin	(substituted off) 48'
LL	4	Bogdan Fedotko
TP	3	Evgeny Pronenko	(substituted off) 63'
HK	2	Stanislav Sel`skiy	(substituted off) 48'
LP	1	Valery Morozov	(substituted off) 52'
Replacements:
HK	16	Evgeny Matveev	(substituted on) 48'
PR	17	Sergey Sekisov	(substituted on) 52'
PR	18	Anton Drozdov	(substituted on) 63'
LK	19	Andrei Garbuzov	(substituted on) 48'
FL	20	Dmitri Krotov	(substituted on) 56'
SH	21	Vasily Dorofeev	(substituted on) 61'
CE	22	Kirill Golosnitsky	(substituted on) 37'	(substituted off) 40'	(substituted on) 56'
FB	23	Alexander Budychenko	(substituted on) 48'
Coach:
(Ireland) Mark McDermott

Touch judges:
Frank Murphy (Ireland)
Ben Whitehouse (Wales)
Television match official:
David Grashoff (England)

Notes:

- Paul Mullen (United States) and Anton Drozdov (Russia) made their international debuts.
- The 49-point difference set surpasses the previous record set in 2004 when the United States won by 30 points (41–11)

9 June 2018
19:00 MDT (UTC-06)

Canada	10–48	Scotland
Try: Penalty try 46'; Pen: O'Leary (1/1) 13'	Report	Try: McGuigan 8' m Jackson 33' c Turner (3) 41' c, 67' m, 71' c Bradbury 54' c Carmichael 78' c Con: Hidalgo-Clyne (2/3) 35', 42'; Kinghorn (3/4) 56', 72', 79'; Pen: Hidalgo-Clyne (1/1) 3'

Commonwealth Stadium, Edmonton
Attendance: 12,824
Referee: Shuhei Kubo (Japan)

Team details

FB	15	Pat Parfrey		(substituted off) 55'
RW	14	Jeff Hassler
OC	13	Ben LeSage		(substituted off) 70'
IC	12	Nick Blevins
LW	11	D. T. H. van der Merwe (c)		(substituted off) 79'
FH	10	Shane O'Leary
SH	9	Phil Mack
N8	8	Luke Campbell
OF	7	Matt Heaton		(substituted off) 18'	(substituted on) 29'
BF	6	Lucas Rumball		(substituted off) 63'
RL	5	Evan Olmstead
LL	4	Paul Ciulini		(substituted off) 63'
TP	3	Jake Ilnicki		(substituted off) 53'
HK	2	Ray Barkwill		(substituted off) 77'
LP	1	Noah Barker	(yellow card) 17' to 27'
Replacements:
HK	16	Eric Howard		(substituted on) 77'
PR	17	Djustice Sears-Duru		(substituted on) 18'	(substituted off) 29'
PR	18	Cole Keith		(substituted on) 53'
LK	19	Conor Keys		(substituted on) 63'
FL	20	Dustin Dobravsky		(substituted on) 63'
SH	21	Andrew Ferguson		(substituted on) 79'
WG	22	Cole Davis		(substituted on) 70'
FB	23	Theo Sauder		(substituted on) 55'
Coach:
(Wales) Kingsley Jones

FB	15	Blair Kinghorn
RW	14	Lee Jones		(substituted off) 29'
OC	13	Chris Harris
IC	12	James Lang		(substituted off) 44'
LW	11	Byron McGuigan
FH	10	Ruaridh Jackson	(yellow card) 46' to 56'
SH	9	Sam Hidalgo-Clyne		(substituted off) 50'
N8	8	David Denton		(substituted off) 68'
OF	7	Jamie Ritchie
BF	6	Magnus Bradbury
RL	5	Grant Gilchrist (c)
LL	4	Ben Toolis		(substituted off) 60'
TP	3	Simon Berghan		(substituted off) 60'
HK	2	Fraser Brown		(substituted off) 29'
LP	1	Allan Dell		(substituted off) 50'
Replacements:
HK	16	George Turner		(substituted on) 29'
PR	17	Jamie Bhatti		(substituted on) 50'
PR	18	Murray McCallum		(substituted on) 60'
LK	19	Lewis Carmichael		(substituted on) 60'
FL	20	Luke Hamilton		(substituted on) 68'
SH	21	Ali Price		(substituted on) 50'
FH	22	Adam Hastings		(substituted on) 44'
CE	23	Mark Bennett		(substituted on) 29'
Coach:
(Scotland) Gregor Townsend

Man of the Match:
David Denton (Scotland)

Touch judges:
George Clancy (Ireland)
Derek Summers (United States)
Television match official:
Dave Ardrey (United States)

Notes:

- Theo Sauder (Canada) and Lewis Carmichael, Adam Hastings, James Lang and Jamie Ritchie (all Scotland) made their international debuts.
- Nick Blevins and Phil Mack (both Canada) earned their 50th test cap.

=== 16 June ===
16 June 2018
14:00 JST (UTC+09)

Japan	22–25	Italy
Try: Tupou 59' c Mafi 64' c Matsushima 79' m Con: Matsuda (2/3) 60', 65'; Pen: Tamura (1/2) 33'		Try: Benvenuti 18' c Ghiraldini 25' m Polledri 43' c Con: Allan (2/3) 19', 44'; Pen: Allan (2/2) 71', 73'

Noevir Stadium Kobe, Kobe
Attendance: 20,276
Referee: Nick Briant (New Zealand)

Team details

FB	15	Kotaro Matsushima
RW	14	Lomano Lemeki
OC	13	Will Tupou
IC	12	Timothy Lafaele		(substituted off) 59'
LW	11	Kenki Fukuoka
FH	10	Yu Tamura		(substituted off) 59'
SH	9	Fumiaki Tanaka		(substituted off) 40'
N8	8	Kazuki Himeno
OF	7	Michael Leitch (c)
BF	6	Yoshitaka Tokunaga		(substituted off) 40'
RL	5	Samuela Anise	(yellow card) 4' to 14'
LL	4	Wimpie van der Walt		(substituted off) 50'
TP	3	Koo Ji-won		(substituted off) 71'
HK	2	Shota Horie		(substituted off) 73'
LP	1	Keita Inagaki		(substituted off) 71'
Replacements:
HK	16	Yusuke Niwai		(substituted on) 73'
PR	17	Shintaro Ishihara		(substituted on) 71'
PR	18	Takuma Asahara		(substituted on) 71'
LK	19	Uwe Helu		(substituted on) 50'
N8	20	Amanaki Mafi		(substituted on) 40'
SH	21	Yutaka Nagare		(substituted on) 40'
FH	22	Rikiya Matsuda		(substituted on) 59'
CE	23	Ryoto Nakamura		(substituted on) 59'
Coach:
(New Zealand) Jamie Joseph

FB	15	Jayden Hayward
RW	14	Tommaso Benvenuti
OC	13	Michele Campagnaro		(substituted off) 62'
IC	12	Tommaso Castello
LW	11	Matteo Minozzi
FH	10	Tommaso Allan
SH	9	Marcello Violi		(substituted off) 50'
N8	8	Braam Steyn
OF	7	Jake Polledri		(substituted off) 73'
BF	6	Sebastian Negri
RL	5	Dean Budd
LL	4	Alessandro Zanni		(substituted off) 68'
TP	3	Tiziano Pasquali		(substituted off) 50'
HK	2	Leonardo Ghiraldini (c)		(substituted off) 71'
LP	1	Andrea Lovotti		(substituted off) 66'
Replacements:
HK	16	Luca Bigi		(substituted on) 71'
PR	17	Cherif Traorè		(substituted on) 66'
PR	18	Simone Ferrari		(substituted on) 50'
LK	19	Marco Fuser		(substituted on) 68'
FL	20	Giovanni Licata	(yellow card) 79' to 80'	(substituted on) 73'
SH	21	Tito Tebaldi		(substituted on) 50'
FH	22	Carlo Canna
CE	23	Giulio Bisegni		(substituted on) 62'
Coach:
(Ireland) Conor O'Shea

Touch judges:
Nigel Owens (Wales)
Nic Berry (Australia)
Television match official:
Rowan Kitt (England)

Notes:

- Yu Tamura (Japan) earned his 50th test cap.
- Cherif Traorè (Italy) made his international debut.

16 June 2018
19:35 NZST (UTC+12)

New Zealand	26–13	France
Try: Moody 12' c B. Smith 19' c J. Barrett (2) 39' c, 56' m Con: McKenzie (3/4) 13', 19', 40'	Report	Try: Gomes Sa 80' c Con: Plisson (1/1) 80'; Pen: Parra (2/2) 10', 30'

Wellington Regional Stadium, Wellington
Attendance: 34,422
Referee: Angus Gardner (Australia)

Team details

FB	15	Jordie Barrett
RW	14	Ben Smith
OC	13	Anton Lienert-Brown		(substituted off) 57'	(substituted on) 71'
IC	12	Ryan Crotty			(substituted off) 71'
LW	11	Rieko Ioane
FH	10	Beauden Barrett		(substituted off) 11'
SH	9	Aaron Smith		(substituted off) 54'
N8	8	Luke Whitelock
OF	7	Sam Cane		(substituted off) 43'
BF	6	Liam Squire		(substituted off) 40'
RL	5	Scott Barrett
LL	4	Sam Whitelock (c)
TP	3	Owen Franks		(substituted off) 33'
HK	2	Codie Taylor		(substituted off) 50'
LP	1	Joe Moody		(substituted off) 45'
Replacements:
HK	16	Nathan Harris		(substituted on) 50'
PR	17	Karl Tu’inukuafe		(substituted on) 45'
PR	18	Ofa Tu'ungafasi		(substituted on) 33'
FL	19	Vaea Fifita		(substituted on) 40'
FL	20	Ardie Savea		(substituted on) 43'
SH	21	TJ Perenara	(yellow card) 62' to 72'	(substituted on) 54'
FH	22	Damian McKenzie		(substituted on) 11'
CE	23	Ngani Laumape		(substituted on) 57'
Coach:
(New Zealand) Steve Hansen

FB	15	Benjamin Fall	(red card) 11'
RW	14	Teddy Thomas
OC	13	Mathieu Bastareaud (c)
IC	12	Geoffrey Doumayrou		(substituted off) 61'
LW	11	Gaël Fickou
FH	10	Anthony Belleau		(substituted off) 71'
SH	9	Morgan Parra		(substituted off) 54'
N8	8	Kevin Gourdon
OF	7	Kélian Galletier		(substituted off) 64'
BF	6	Mathieu Babillot
RL	5	Yoann Maestri		(substituted off) 57'
LL	4	Bernard Le Roux
TP	3	Uini Atonio		(substituted off) 47'
HK	2	Camille Chat		(substituted off) 57'
LP	1	Dany Priso		(substituted off) 47'
Replacements:
HK	16	Pierre Bougarit		(substituted on) 57'
PR	17	Cyril Baille		(substituted on) 47'
PR	18	Cedate Gomes Sa		(substituted on) 47'
LK	19	Paul Gabrillagues		(substituted on) 57'
FL	20	Alexandre Lapandry		(substituted on) 64'
SH	21	Baptiste Serin		(substituted on) 54'
FH	22	Jules Plisson		(substituted on) 71'
FB	23	Maxime Médard		(substituted on) 61'
Coach:
(France) Jacques Brunel

Man of the Match:
Jordie Barrett (New Zealand)

Touch judges:
John Lacey (Ireland)
Luke Pearce (England)
Television match official:
George Ayoub (Australia)

Notes:

- Pierre Bougarit (France) made his international debut.
- New Zealand retain the Dave Gallaher Trophy.

16 June 2018
20:00 AEST (UTC+10)

Australia	21–26	Ireland
Try: Beale 1' c Penalty try 25'; Tupou 77' c Con: Foley (2/2) 2', 77'	Report	Try: Conway 6' c Furlong 53' c Con: Sexton (2/2) 7', 55'; Pen: Sexton (4/5) 12', 16', 21', 65'

Melbourne Rectangular Stadium, Melbourne
Attendance: 29,018
Referee: Paul Williams (New Zealand)

Team details

FB	15	Israel Folau
RW	14	Dane Haylett-Petty
OC	13	Samu Kerevi
IC	12	Kurtley Beale		(substituted off) 63'
LW	11	Marika Koroibete	(yellow card) 6' to 16'
FH	10	Bernard Foley
SH	9	Will Genia		(substituted off) 26'
N8	8	Caleb Timu		(substituted off) 40'
OF	7	Michael Hooper (c)
BF	6	David Pocock
RL	5	Adam Coleman		(substituted off) 42'
LL	4	Izack Rodda		(substituted off) 55'
TP	3	Sekope Kepu		(substituted off) 50'
HK	2	Brandon Paenga-Amosa		(substituted off) 40'
LP	1	Scott Sio		(substituted off) 71'
Replacements:
HK	16	Tolu Latu		(substituted on) 40'
PR	17	Tom Robertson		(substituted on) 71'
PR	18	Taniela Tupou		(substituted on) 50'
LK	19	Rob Simmons		(substituted on) 42'
LK	20	Lukhan Tui		(substituted on) 40'
FL	21	Pete Samu		(substituted on) 55'
SH	22	Nick Phipps		(substituted on) 26'
WG	23	Reece Hodge		(substituted on) 63'
Coach:
(Australia) Michael Cheika

FB	15	Rob Kearney
RW	14	Andrew Conway		(substituted off) 14'
OC	13	Garry Ringrose
IC	12	Robbie Henshaw
LW	11	Keith Earls
FH	10	Johnny Sexton		(substituted off) 78'
SH	9	Conor Murray
N8	8	CJ Stander
OF	7	Dan Leavy		(substituted off) 31'	(substituted on) 38'	(substituted off) 40'
BF	6	Peter O'Mahony (c)		(substituted off) 63'
RL	5	James Ryan
LL	4	Devin Toner		(substituted off) 75'
TP	3	Tadhg Furlong		(substituted off) 71'
HK	2	Niall Scannell		(substituted off) 48'
LP	1	Cian Healy	(yellow card) 26' to 36'			(substituted off) 45'
Replacements:
HK	16	Rob Herring		(substituted on) 48'
PR	17	Jack McGrath	(yellow card) 76' to 80'	(substituted on) 31'	(substituted off) 38'	(substituted on) 45'
PR	18	Andrew Porter		(substituted on) 71'
LK	19	Tadhg Beirne		(substituted on) 63'
FL	20	Jordi Murphy				(substituted on) 40'
SH	21	John Cooney		(substituted on) 78'
FH	22	Joey Carbery		(substituted on) 75'
FB	23	Jordan Larmour		(substituted on) 14'
Coach:
(New Zealand) Joe Schmidt

Man of the Match:
Tadhg Furlong (Ireland)

Touch judges:
Pascal Gaüzère (France)
Marius van der Westhuizen (South Africa)
Television match official:
Ben Skeen (New Zealand)

Notes:

- Tadhg Beirne (Ireland) made his international debut.
- This was Ireland's first win in Australia since their 9–3 victory in Sydney in 1979.

16 June 2018
17:05 SAST (UTC+02)

South Africa	23–12	England
Try: Vermeulen 23' c Penalty try 49'; Con: Pollard (1/1) 24'; Pen: Pollard (3/4) 28', 38', 66'	Report	Try: Brown 9' c May 12' m Con: Farrell (1/2) 10'

Free State Stadium, Bloemfontein
Referee: Romain Poite (France)

Team details

FB	15	Willie le Roux
RW	14	Sbu Nkosi
OC	13	Lukhanyo Am	(substituted off) 59'
IC	12	Damian de Allende
LW	11	Aphiwe Dyantyi
FH	10	Handré Pollard
SH	9	Faf de Klerk	(substituted off) 74'
N8	8	Duane Vermeulen
OF	7	Pieter-Steph du Toit
BF	6	Siya Kolisi (c)	(substituted off) 65'
RL	5	Franco Mostert
LL	4	RG Snyman	(substituted off) 55'
TP	3	Frans Malherbe	(substituted off) 44'
HK	2	Bongi Mbonambi	(substituted off) 50'
LP	1	Tendai Mtawarira	(substituted off) 44'
Replacements:
HK	16	Akker van der Merwe	(substituted on) 50'
PR	17	Steven Kitshoff	(substituted on) 44'
PR	18	Thomas du Toit	(substituted on) 44'
FL	19	Jean-Luc du Preez	(substituted on) 55'
FL	20	Sikhumbuzo Notshe	(substituted on) 65'
SH	21	Ivan van Zyl	(substituted on) 74'
CE	22	Jesse Kriel	(substituted on) 59'
WG	23	Warrick Gelant
Coach:
(South Africa) Rassie Erasmus

FB	15	Elliot Daly
RW	14	Jonny May
OC	13	Henry Slade
IC	12	Owen Farrell (c)
LW	11	Mike Brown		(substituted off) 66'
FH	10	George Ford		(substituted off) 66'
SH	9	Ben Youngs		(substituted off) 72'
N8	8	Billy Vunipola		(substituted off) 40'
OF	7	Tom Curry
BF	6	Brad Shields		(substituted off) 66'
RL	5	Maro Itoje
LL	4	Joe Launchbury
TP	3	Kyle Sinckler		(substituted off) 50'
HK	2	Jamie George		(substituted off) 61'
LP	1	Mako Vunipola		(substituted off) 57'
Replacements:
HK	16	Luke Cowan-Dickie		(substituted on) 61'
PR	17	Joe Marler		(substituted on) 57'
PR	18	Harry Williams		(substituted on) 50'
FL	19	Mark Wilson		(substituted on) 66'
N8	20	Nathan Hughes	(yellow card) 68' to 78'	(substituted on) 40'
SH	21	Ben Spencer		(substituted on) 72'
FH	22	Danny Cipriani		(substituted on) 66'
WG	23	Denny Solomona		(substituted on) 66'
Coach:
(Australia) Eddie Jones

Man of the Match:
Duane Vermeulen (South Africa)

Touch judges:
Glen Jackson (New Zealand)
Ben O'Keeffe (New Zealand)
Television match official:
Simon McDowell (Ireland)

Notes:

- Tendai Mtawarira (South Africa) earned his 100th test cap.

16 June 2018
16:40 ART (UTC-03)

Argentina	12–30	Wales
Try: Delguy 38' m Montoya 80' c Con: Sánchez (1/2) 80'	Report	Try: Adams 22' c Amos 55' m Con: Patchell (1/2) 23'; Pen: Patchell (6/7) 8', 15', 33', 37', 41', 51'

Estadio Brigadier General Estanislao López, Santa Fe
Attendance: 26,820
Referee: Jaco Peyper (South Africa)

Team details

FB	15	Emiliano Boffelli
RW	14	Bautista Delguy
OC	13	Matías Orlando
IC	12	Jerónimo de la Fuente	(substituted off) 67'
LW	11	Ramiro Moyano	(substituted off) 55'
FH	10	Nicolás Sánchez
SH	9	Martín Landajo	(substituted off) 51'
N8	8	Javier Ortega Desio
OF	7	Marcos Kremer
BF	6	Pablo Matera	(substituted off) 48'
RL	5	Tomás Lavanini	(substituted off) 48'
LL	4	Guido Petti
TP	3	Nahuel Tetaz Chaparro	(substituted off) 58'
HK	2	Agustín Creevy (c)	(substituted off) 48'
LP	1	Santiago García Botta	(substituted off) 51'
Replacements:
HK	16	Julián Montoya	(substituted on) 48'
PR	17	Javier Díaz	(substituted on) 51'
PR	18	Santiago Medrano	(substituted on) 58'
LK	19	Matías Alemanno	(substituted on) 48'
FL	20	Tomás Lezana	(substituted on) 48'
SH	21	Gonzalo Bertranou	(substituted on) 51'
FH	22	Santiago González Iglesias	(substituted on) 67'
WG	23	Sebastián Cancelliere	(substituted on) 55'
Coach:
(Argentina) Daniel Hourcade

FB	15	Hallam Amos		(substituted off) 70'
RW	14	Josh Adams
OC	13	Scott Williams
IC	12	Owen Watkin
LW	11	George North
FH	10	Rhys Patchell		(substituted off) 57'
SH	9	Aled Davies		(substituted off) 57'
N8	8	Ross Moriarty	(red card) 80'
OF	7	James Davies		(substituted off) 70'
BF	6	Ellis Jenkins
RL	5	Cory Hill (c)
LL	4	Adam Beard		(substituted off) 60'
TP	3	Tomas Francis		(substituted off) 57'
HK	2	Ryan Elias		(substituted off) 60'
LP	1	Rob Evans		(substituted off) 64'
Replacements:
HK	16	Elliot Dee		(substituted on) 60'
PR	17	Nicky Smith		(substituted on) 64'
PR	18	Dillon Lewis		(substituted on) 57'
LK	19	Bradley Davies		(substituted on) 60'
FL	20	Josh Turnbull		(substituted on) 70'
SH	21	Tomos Williams		(substituted on) 57'
FH	22	Gareth Anscombe		(substituted on) 57'
WG	23	Tom Prydie		(substituted on) 70'
Coach:
(New Zealand) Warren Gatland

Touch judges:
Mathieu Raynal (France)
Andrew Brace (Ireland)
Television match official:
Marius Jonker (South Africa)

Notes:

- This win sees Wales claim their first series victory over Argentina since 1999.

16 June 2018
16:00 EDT (UTC-04)

Canada	20–43	Russia
Try: Campbell 33' c Blevins 73' c Con: Staller (1/1) 35'; O'Leary (1/1) 74'; Pen: Staller (2/2) 2', 46'		Try: Rudoy (3) 9' m, 29' c, 54' c Vavilin 19' c Mikhaltsov 36' c, 42' c Con: Kushnarev (5/6) 21', 31', 38', 43', 55'; Pen: Kushnarev (1/1) 67'

Twin Elm Rugby Park, Ottawa
Attendance: 3,312
Referee: Ben Whitehouse (Wales)

Team details

FB	15	Brock Staller	(substituted off) 55'
RW	14	Jeff Hassler
OC	13	Doug Fraser
IC	12	Nick Blevins
LW	11	Cole Davis
FH	10	Theo Sauder	(substituted off) 65'
SH	9	Andrew Ferguson	(substituted off) 56'
N8	8	Luke Campbell
OF	7	Lucas Rumball (c)
BF	6	Dustin Dobravsky	(substituted off) 55'
RL	5	Evan Olmstead
LL	4	Josh Larsen	(substituted off) 72'
TP	3	Cole Keith	(substituted off) 65'
HK	2	Ray Barkwill	(substituted off) 55'
LP	1	Noah Barker	(substituted off) 31'
Replacements:
HK	16	Eric Howard	(substituted on) 55'
PR	17	Djustice Sears-Duru	(substituted on) 31'
PR	18	Ryan Kotlewski	(substituted on) 65'
LK	19	Conor Keys	(substituted on) 72'
FL	20	Matt Heaton	(substituted on) 55'
SH	21	Jorden Sandover-Best	(substituted on) 56'
FH	22	Shane O'Leary	(substituted on) 55'
CE	23	Giuseppe du Toit	(substituted on) 65'
Coach:
(Wales) Kingsley Jones

FB	15	Vasily Artemyev (c)
RW	14	Mikhail Babaev
OC	13	Kirill Golosnitsky
IC	12	Sergey Trishin		(substituted off) 72'
LW	11	Alexey Mikhaltsov
FH	10	Yuri Kushnarev		(substituted off) 74'
SH	9	Alexei Shcherban		(substituted off) 58'
N8	8	Anton Rudoy	(yellow card) 58' to 68'
OF	7	Dmitri Krotov		(substituted off) 40'
BF	6	Nikita Vavilin		(substituted off) 47'
RL	5	Andrei Garbuzov
LL	4	Bogdan Fedotko
TP	3	Evgeny Pronenko	(yellow card) 55' to 65'		(substituted off) 62'
HK	2	Stanislav Sel`skiy		(substituted off) 58'
LP	1	Valery Morozov		(substituted off) 58'
Replacements:
HK	16	Evgeny Matveev		(substituted on) 58'
PR	17	Sergey Sekisov		(substituted on) 58'
PR	18	Anton Drozdov			(substituted on) 62'
FL	19	Tagir Gadzhiev		(substituted on) 47'
FL	20	Anton Sychev		(substituted on) 40'
SH	21	Vasily Dorofeev		(substituted on) 58'
FB	22	Alexander Budychenko		(substituted on) 74'
FH	23	German Godlyuk		(substituted on) 72'
Coach:
(Ireland) Mark McDermott

Man of the Match:
Anton Rudoy (Russia)

Touch judges:
George Clancy (Ireland)
Alexandre Ruiz (France)
Television match official:
Andrew McMaster (Canada)

Notes:

- Jorden Sandover-Best (Canada) made his international debut.
- This was Russia's first victory over Canada.

16 June 2018
20:00 CDT (UTC-05)

United States	30–29	Scotland
Try: Taufete'e (2) 37' c, 42' c Germishuys 58' c Con: MacGinty (3/3) 38', 43', 60'; Pen: MacGinty (3/3) 16', 28', 47'	Report	Try: Kinghorn 1' c Penalty try 24'; Turner 33' c Fife 80' m Con: Kinghorn (2/3) 2', 35'; Pen: Kinghorn (1/2) 40'

BBVA Compass Stadium, Houston
Referee: Wayne Barnes (England)

Team details

FB	15	Will Hooley
RW	14	Blaine Scully (c)
OC	13	Bryce Campbell
IC	12	Paul Lasike		(substituted off) 74'
LW	11	Marcel Brache
FH	10	AJ MacGinty
SH	9	Shaun Davies		(substituted off) 68'
N8	8	Cam Dolan
OF	7	Hanco Germishuys		(substituted off) 66'	(substituted on) 72'	(substituted off) 80'
BF	6	John Quill		(substituted off) 80'
RL	5	Nick Civetta
LL	4	Samu Manoa	(yellow card) 24' to 34'	(substituted off) 66'
TP	3	Paul Mullen		(substituted off) 68'
HK	2	Joe Taufete'e		(substituted off) 76'
LP	1	Eric Fry		(substituted off) 61'
Replacements:
HK	16	Dylan Fawsitt		(substituted on) 76'
PR	17	Titi Lamositele		(substituted on) 61'
PR	18	Chris Baumann		(substituted on) 68'
LK	19	Greg Peterson		(substituted on) 66'
LK	20	Ben Landry		(substituted on) 66'	(substituted off) 72'	(substituted on) 80'
SH	21	Nate Augspurger		(substituted on) 68'
FH	22	Will Magie		(substituted on) 80'
CE	23	Dylan Audsley		(substituted on) 74'
Coach:
(South Africa) Gary Gold

FB	15	Stuart Hogg (c)
RW	14	Blair Kinghorn
OC	13	Nick Grigg	(substituted off) 57'
IC	12	Peter Horne
LW	11	Byron McGuigan	(substituted off) 71'
FH	10	Adam Hastings
SH	9	George Horne	(substituted off) 63'
N8	8	Matt Fagerson	(substituted off) 63'
OF	7	Luke Hamilton	(substituted off) 50'
BF	6	Tim Swinson
RL	5	Ben Toolis
LL	4	Lewis Carmichael	(substituted off) 52'
TP	3	Zander Fagerson	(substituted off) 57'
HK	2	George Turner
LP	1	Jamie Bhatti	(substituted off) 57'
Replacements:
HK	16	Fraser Brown	(substituted on) 50'
PR	17	Allan Dell	(substituted on) 57'
PR	18	Murray McCallum	(substituted on) 57'
LK	19	Grant Gilchrist	(substituted on) 52'
N8	20	David Denton	(substituted on) 63'
SH	21	Sam Hidalgo-Clyne	(substituted on) 63'
FH	22	Mark Bennett	(substituted on) 57'
WG	23	Dougie Fife	(substituted on) 71'
Coach:
(Scotland) Gregor Townsend

Touch judges:
Shuhei Kubo (Japan)
Federico Anselmi (Argentina)
Television match official:
David Grashoff (England)

Notes:

- Matt Fagerson and George Horne (both Scotland) made their international debuts.
- This was the United States first win over Scotland, and their first against a Tier 1 nation since winning 17–3 against France in 1924.

=== 23 June ===
23 June 2018
15:00 FJT (UTC+12)

Fiji	19–27	Tonga
Try: Lomani 33' c Goneva 47' m Mata 51' c Con: Volavola (2/3) 33', 53'		Try: Ngauamo 20' c Mafi 43' c D. Faleafa 71' c Con: Takulua (3/3) 22', 44', 72'; Pen: Takulua (2/2) 65', 69'

Churchill Park, Lautoka
Attendance: 6,000
Referee: Luke Pearce (England)

Team details

FB	15	Kini Murimurivalu
RW	14	Timoci Nagusa
OC	13	Vereniki Goneva	(yellow card) 69' to 79'	(substituted off) 79'
IC	12	Jale Vatubua
LW	11	Nemani Nadolo		(substituted off) 46'
FH	10	Ben Volavola
SH	9	Frank Lomani		(substituted off) 76'
N8	8	Akapusi Qera (c)		(substituted off) 69'
OF	7	Mosese Voka
BF	6	Dominiko Waqaniburotu
RL	5	Leone Nakarawa
LL	4	Viliame Mata		(substituted off) 53'
TP	3	Manasa Saulo		(substituted off) 69'
HK	2	Talemaitoga Tuapati		(substituted off) 56'
LP	1	Campese Ma'afu		(substituted off) 62'
Replacements:
HK	16	Veremalua Vugakoto		(substituted on) 56'
PR	17	Peni Ravai		(substituted on) 62'
PR	18	Mosese Ducivaki		(substituted on) 69'
LK	19	Albert Tuisue		(substituted on) 53'
N8	20	Nemani Nagusa		(substituted on) 69'
SH	21	Serupepeli Vularika		(substituted on) 76'
FH	22	Alivereti Veitokani		(substituted on) 79'
CE	23	Sevanaia Galala		(substituted on) 46'
Coach:
(New Zealand) John McKee

FB	15	David Halaifonua
RW	14	Viliami Lolohea
OC	13	Nafi Tuitavake
IC	12	Cooper Vuna
LW	11	Penikolo Latu
FH	10	Kurt Morath	(substituted off) 60'
SH	9	Sonatane Takulua
N8	8	Nasi Manu	(substituted off) 56'
OF	7	Fotu Lokotui	(substituted off) 65'
BF	6	Maama Vaipulu
RL	5	Steve Mafi (c)
LL	4	Leva Fifita
TP	3	Siua Halanukonuka	(substituted off) 40'
HK	2	Paul Ngauamo	(substituted off) 65'
LP	1	Siegfried Fisiihoi	(substituted off) 65'
Replacements:
HK	16	Sosefo Sakalia	(substituted on) 65'
PR	17	Ben Tameifuna	(substituted on) 40'
PR	18	David Feao	(substituted on) 65'
LK	19	Daniel Faleafa	(substituted on) 56'
FL	20	Michael Faleafa	(substituted on) 65'
SH	21	Shinnosuke Tu'umoto'oa
CE	22	Latiume Fosita	(substituted on) 60'
CE	23	James Faiva
Coach:
(Australia) Toutai Kefu

Touch judges:
Brendon Pickerill (New Zealand)
Jordan Way (Australia)
Television match official:
Ian Smith (Australia)

Notes:

- Albert Tuisue (Fiji) made his international debut.
- Leone Nakarawa (Fiji) earned his 50th test cap.
- Vereniki Goneva's try was his 20th try which equaled Fiji's top try score set by Sanivalati Laulau back in 1985.
- This is the first time Tonga has beaten Fiji since their 32–20 loss in 2011.

23 June 2018
14:45 JST (UTC+09)

Japan	28–0	Georgia
Try: Van der Walt 48' c Lemeki 51' c Himeno 66' m Con: Tamura (2/2) 49', 53'; Pen: Tamura (2/5) 3', 31'; Noguchi (1/1) 40'

Toyota Stadium, Toyota
Attendance: 14,776
Referee: Nigel Owens (Wales)

Team details

FB	15	Ryuji Noguchi
RW	14	Lomano Lemeki	22' to 30'
OC	13	Timothy Lafaele				(substituted off) 68'
IC	12	Harumichi Tatekawa
LW	11	Akihito Yamada
FH	10	Yu Tamura			67' to 68'
SH	9	Yutaka Nagare	(substituted off) 67'
N8	8	Amanaki Mafi	(substituted off) 62'
OF	7	Shunsuke Nunomaki	(substituted off) 40'
BF	6	Michael Leitch (c)
RL	5	Shinya Makabe	(substituted off) 47'
LL	4	Samuela Anise
TP	3	Koo Ji-won	(substituted off) 60'
HK	2	Shota Horie	(substituted off) 70'
LP	1	Keita Inagaki	(substituted off) 70'
Replacements:
HK	16	Yusuke Niwai	(substituted on) 70'
PR	17	Shintaro Ishihara	(substituted on) 70'
PR	18	Takuma Asahara	(substituted on) 60'
LK	19	Wimpie van der Walt	(substituted on) 47'
FL	20	Kazuki Himeno	(substituted on) 62'
FL	21	Masakatsu Nishikawa	(substituted on) 40'
SH	22	Fumiaki Tanaka	(substituted on) 67'
FH	23	Rikiya Matsuda	(substituted on) 22'	(substituted off) 30'	(substituted on) 67'
Coach:
(New Zealand) Jamie Joseph

FB	15	Merab Kvirikashvili
RW	14	Alexander Todua
OC	13	Davit Kacharava
IC	12	Giorgi Kveseladze		(substituted off) 54'
LW	11	Soso Matiashvili
FH	10	Lasha Khmaladze
SH	9	Vasil Lobzhanidze		(substituted off) 76'
N8	8	Otar Giorgadze
OF	7	Viktor Kolelishvili	(yellow card) 17' to 27'
BF	6	Giorgi Tsutskiridze		(substituted off) 60'
RL	5	Konstantin Mikautadze		(substituted off) 54'
LL	4	Giorgi Nemsadze (c)		(substituted off) 62'
TP	3	Irakli Mirtskhulava		(substituted off) 62'
HK	2	Jaba Bregvadze		(substituted off) 60'
LP	1	Karlen Asieshvili		(substituted off) 54'
Replacements:
HK	16	Shalva Mamukashvili		(substituted on) 60'
PR	17	Zurab Zhvania		(substituted on) 54'
PR	18	Giorgi Melikidze		(substituted on) 62'
LK	19	Nodar Tcheishvili		(substituted on) 54'
N8	20	Mikheil Gachechiladze		(substituted on) 60'
SH	21	Giorgi Begadze		(substituted on) 76'
CE	22	Lasha Malaghuradze		(substituted on) 54'
WG	23	Anzor Sitchinava		(substituted on) 62'
Coach:
(New Zealand) Milton Haig

Touch judges:
Nick Briant (New Zealand)
Nic Berry (Australia)
Television match official:
Shane McDermott (New Zealand)

Notes:

- Masakatsu Nishikawa (Japan) made his international debut.
- Viktor Kolelishvili (Georgia) earned his 50th test cap.
- This is Japan's biggest winning margin over Georgia, surpassing the 25-point difference set in 2006.

23 June 2018
19:35 NZST (UTC+12)

New Zealand	49–14	France
Try: B. Smith 15' c Todd 22' c McKenzie (2) 31' c, 46' c Ioane (3) 52' c, 58' c, 64' c Con: McKenzie (7/7) 16', 23', 32', 47', 53', 59', 65'		Try: Serin 11' c Fofana 27' c Con: Belleau (2/2) 12', 28'

Forsyth Barr Stadium, Dunedin
Attendance: 30,000
Referee: John Lacey (Ireland)

Team details

FB	15	Ben Smith
RW	14	Waisake Naholo
OC	13	Jack Goodhue
IC	12	Sonny Bill Williams	(substituted off) 57'
LW	11	Rieko Ioane
FH	10	Damian McKenzie	(substituted off) 69'
SH	9	Aaron Smith	(substituted off) 63'
N8	8	Luke Whitelock
OF	7	Ardie Savea	(substituted off) 16'
BF	6	Shannon Frizell	21' to 30'
RL	5	Scott Barrett
LL	4	Sam Whitelock (c)			(substituted off) 69'
TP	3	Owen Franks	(substituted off) 45'
HK	2	Codie Taylor	(substituted off) 71'
LP	1	Joe Moody	(substituted off) 63'
Replacements:
HK	16	Liam Coltman	(substituted on) 71'
PR	17	Karl Tu’inukuafe	(substituted on) 63'
PR	18	Ofa Tu'ungafasi	(substituted on) 45'
LK	19	Jackson Hemopo	(substituted on) 21'	(substituted off) 30'	(substituted on) 69'
FL	20	Matt Todd	(substituted on) 16'
SH	21	TJ Perenara	(substituted on) 63'
FH	22	Richie Mo'unga	(substituted on) 69'
FB	23	Jordie Barrett	(substituted on) 57'
Coach:
(New Zealand) Steve Hansen

FB	15	Benjamin Fall	(substituted off) 47'	(substituted on) 59'
RW	14	Teddy Thomas			(substituted off) 63'
OC	13	Rémi Lamerat	(substituted off) 74'
IC	12	Wesley Fofana
LW	11	Gaël Fickou
FH	10	Anthony Belleau
SH	9	Morgan Parra (c)	(substituted off) 7'
N8	8	Kevin Gourdon	(substituted off) 50'
OF	7	Kélian Galletier
BF	6	Mathieu Babillot
RL	5	Yoann Maestri
LL	4	Bernard Le Roux	(substituted off) 63'
TP	3	Uini Atonio	(substituted off) 50'
HK	2	Camille Chat	44' to 48'		(substituted off) 63'
LP	1	Dany Priso	(substituted off) 50'
Replacements:
HK	16	Adrien Pélissié	(substituted on) 44'	(substituted off) 48'	(substituted on) 63'
PR	17	Cyril Baille	(substituted on) 50'
PR	18	Cedate Gomes Sa	(substituted on) 50'
LK	19	Félix Lambey	(substituted on) 63'
FL	20	Alexandre Lapandry	(substituted on) 50'
SH	21	Baptiste Serin	(substituted on) 7'
FH	22	Jules Plisson	(substituted on) 74'
FB	23	Maxime Médard	(substituted on) 47'	(substituted off) 59'	(substituted on) 63'
Coach:
(France) Jacques Brunel

Man of the Match:
Scott Barrett (New Zealand)

Touch judges:
Angus Gardner (Australia)
Graham Cooper (Australia)
Television match official:
George Ayoub (Australia)

Notes:

- Shannon Frizell, Jack Goodhue, Jackson Hemopo and Richie Mo'unga (all New Zealand) and Félix Lambey (France) made their international debuts.
- Maxime Médard (France) earned his 50th test cap.

23 June 2018
20:00 AEST (UTC+10)

Australia	16–20	Ireland
Try: Koroibete 53' c Con: Foley (1/1) 55'; Pen: Foley (3/4) 12', 21', 39'		Try: Stander 43' m Pen: Sexton (5/5) 8', 29', 34', 40', 78'

Sydney Football Stadium, Sydney
Attendance: 44,085
Referee: Pascal Gaüzère (France)

Team details

FB	15	Israel Folau	(yellow card) 30' to 40'
RW	14	Dane Haylett-Petty
OC	13	Samu Kerevi
IC	12	Kurtley Beale
LW	11	Marika Koroibete		(substituted off) 68'
FH	10	Bernard Foley
SH	9	Nick Phipps		(substituted off) 60'
N8	8	David Pocock
OF	7	Michael Hooper (c)		(substituted off) 15'
BF	6	Lukhan Tui
RL	5	Adam Coleman		(substituted off) 44'
LL	4	Izack Rodda		(substituted off) 71'
TP	3	Sekope Kepu		(substituted off) 55'
HK	2	Brandon Paenga-Amosa		(substituted off) 40'
LP	1	Scott Sio		(substituted off) 60'
Replacements:
HK	16	Tolu Latu		(substituted on) 40'
PR	17	Tom Robertson		(substituted on) 60'
PR	18	Taniela Tupou		(substituted on) 55'
LK	19	Rob Simmons		(substituted on) 44'
FL	20	Ned Hanigan		(substituted on) 71'
FL	21	Pete Samu		(substituted on) 15'
SH	22	Joe Powell		(substituted on) 60'
WG	23	Reece Hodge		(substituted on) 68'
Coach:
(Australia) Michael Cheika

FB	15	Rob Kearney		(substituted off) 57'
RW	14	Keith Earls
OC	13	Robbie Henshaw
IC	12	Bundee Aki
LW	11	Jacob Stockdale	(yellow card) 20' to 30'
FH	10	Johnny Sexton
SH	9	Conor Murray
N8	8	Jack Conan		(substituted off) 68'
OF	7	Peter O'Mahony (c)		(substituted off) 30'
BF	6	CJ Stander
RL	5	James Ryan
LL	4	Devin Toner
TP	3	Tadhg Furlong		(substituted off) 66'
HK	2	Niall Scannell		(substituted off) 55'
LP	1	Jack McGrath		(substituted off) 55'
Replacements:
HK	16	Rob Herring		(substituted on) 55'
PR	17	Cian Healy		(substituted on) 55'
PR	18	John Ryan		(substituted on) 66'
LK	19	Tadhg Beirne		(substituted on) 68'
FL	20	Jordi Murphy		(substituted on) 30'
SH	21	Kieran Marmion
FH	22	Ross Byrne
FB	23	Jordan Larmour		(substituted on) 57'
Coach:
(New Zealand) Joe Schmidt

Man of the Match:
CJ Stander (Ireland)

Touch judges:
Paul Williams (New Zealand)
Cam Stone (New Zealand)
Television match official:
Ben Skeen (New Zealand)

Notes:

- Jack McGrath and Peter O'Mahony (both Ireland) earned their 50th test cap.
- Ireland claim their first series victory over Australia since 1979 and retain the Lansdowne Cup.

23 June 2018
17:05 SAST (UTC+02)

South Africa	10–25	England
Try: Kriel 45' c Con: Jantjies (1/1) 46'; Pen: Jantjies (1/2) 40'		Try: May 71' c Con: Farrell (1/1) 72'; Pen: Farrell (6/6) 9', 36', 43', 49', 57', 75'

Newlands Stadium, Cape Town
Attendance: 33,827
Referee: Glen Jackson (New Zealand)

Team details

FB	15	Warrick Gelant
RW	14	Sbu Nkosi	(substituted off) 49'
OC	13	Jesse Kriel
IC	12	André Esterhuizen
LW	11	Aphiwe Dyantyi
FH	10	Elton Jantjies	(substituted off) 57'
SH	9	Faf de Klerk	(substituted off) 75'
N8	8	Duane Vermeulen
OF	7	Pieter-Steph du Toit
BF	6	Siya Kolisi (c)	(substituted off) 65'
RL	5	Franco Mostert
LL	4	RG Snyman	(substituted off) 57'
TP	3	Frans Malherbe	(substituted off) 43'
HK	2	Chiliboy Ralepelle	(substituted off) 43'
LP	1	Tendai Mtawarira	(substituted off) 43'
Replacements:
HK	16	Schalk Brits	(substituted on) 43'
PR	17	Steven Kitshoff	(substituted on) 43'
PR	18	Thomas du Toit	(substituted on) 43'
FL	19	Jean-Luc du Preez	(substituted on) 57'
FL	20	Sikhumbuzo Notshe	(substituted on) 65'
SH	21	Embrose Papier	(substituted on) 75'
CE	22	Handré Pollard	(substituted on) 57'
FB	23	Willie le Roux	(substituted on) 49'
Coach:
(South Africa) Rassie Erasmus

FB	15	Elliot Daly
RW	14	Jonny May
OC	13	Henry Slade	(substituted off) 77'
IC	12	Owen Farrell (c)
LW	11	Mike Brown
FH	10	Danny Cipriani
SH	9	Ben Youngs
N8	8	Nathan Hughes	(substituted off) 52'
OF	7	Tom Curry
BF	6	Chris Robshaw
RL	5	Maro Itoje
LL	4	Joe Launchbury
TP	3	Kyle Sinckler	(substituted off) 47'
HK	2	Jamie George
LP	1	Mako Vunipola
Replacements:
HK	16	Luke Cowan-Dickie
PR	17	Alec Hepburn
PR	18	Harry Williams	(substituted on) 47'
LK	19	Jonny Hill
FL	20	Mark Wilson	(substituted on) 52'
FL	21	Sam Simmonds
SH	22	Ben Spencer
WG	23	Denny Solomona	(substituted on) 77'
Coach:
(Australia) Eddie Jones

Man of the Match:
Jonny May (England)

Touch judges:
Romain Poite (France)
Ben O'Keeffe (New Zealand)
Television match official:
Simon McDowell (Ireland)

Notes:

- This was England's first victory over South Africa in South Africa since they won 27–22 in 2000.

23 June 2018
16:00 ADT (UTC-03)

Canada	17–42	United States
Try: Olmstead 51' c Hassler 76' c Con: O'Leary (2/2) 53', 76'; Pen: O'Leary (1/1) 16'		Try: Dolan (3) 22' m, 45' c, 68' m Augspurger 35' m Scully 72' c De Haas 79' c Con: MacGinty (3/6) 47', 74', 80'; Pen: MacGinty (2/2) 28', 57'

Wanderers Grounds, Halifax, Nova Scotia
Attendance: 6,200
Referee: Alexandre Ruiz (France)

Team details

FB	15	Pat Parfrey
RW	14	Jeff Hassler
OC	13	Ben LeSage
IC	12	Nick Blevins
LW	11	Kainoa Lloyd
FH	10	Shane O'Leary
SH	9	Phil Mack
N8	8	Luke Campbell
OF	7	Matt Heaton	(substituted off) 67'
BF	6	Lucas Rumball (c)
RL	5	Evan Olmstead
LL	4	Josh Larsen	(substituted off) 67'
TP	3	Jake Ilnicki
HK	2	Ray Barkwill	(substituted off) 69'
LP	1	Djustice Sears-Duru	(substituted off) 69'
Replacements:
HK	16	Eric Howard	(substituted on) 69'
PR	17	Noah Barker	(substituted on) 69'
PR	18	Ryan Kotlewski
LK	19	Paul Ciulini	(substituted on) 67'
FL	20	Dustin Dobravsky	(substituted on) 67'
SH	21	Jorden Sandover-Best
CE	22	Giuseppe du Toit
FB	23	Theo Sauder
Coach:
(Wales) Kingsley Jones

FB	15	Will Hooley
RW	14	Blaine Scully (c)
OC	13	Marcel Brache
IC	12	Paul Lasike	(substituted off) 64'
LW	11	Nate Augspurger	(substituted off) 74'
FH	10	AJ MacGinty
SH	9	Shaun Davies	(substituted off) 74'
N8	8	Cam Dolan
OF	7	Hanco Germishuys
BF	6	Ben Landry	(substituted off) 62'
RL	5	Nick Civetta
LL	4	Samu Manoa	(substituted off) 62'
TP	3	Paul Mullen	(substituted off) 67'
HK	2	Dylan Fawsitt	(substituted off) 74'
LP	1	Eric Fry	(substituted off) 69'
Replacements:
PR	16	Chris Baumann	(substituted on) 67'
PR	17	Titi Lamositele	(substituted on) 69'
PR	18	Olive Kilifi	(substituted on) 74'
LK	19	Greg Peterson	(substituted on) 62'
FL	20	Vili Toluta’u	(substituted on) 62'
SH	21	Ruben de Haas	(substituted on) 74'
FH	22	Will Magie	(substituted on) 74'
CE	23	Bryce Campbell	(substituted on) 64'
Coach:
(South Africa) Gary Gold

Man of the Match:
AJ MacGinty (United States)

Touch judges:
Wayne Barnes (England)
Federico Anselmi (Argentina)
Television match official:
Graham Hughes (England)

Notes:

- Vili Toluta’u (United States) made his international debut.

23 June 2018
16:40 ART (UTC-03)

Argentina	15–44	Scotland
Try: Lezana 49' c Gonzalez Iglesias 57' m Con: Sanchez (1/2) 50'; Pen: Sanchez (1/1) 17'		Try: G. Horne (2) 1' c, 38' m Kinghorn 7' c McInally 12' c Bradbury 20' c Fife 53' m Con: P. Horne (4/6) 1', 8', 14', 21'; Pen: P. Horne (2/2) 27', 61'

Estadio Centenario, Resistencia
Attendance: 22,340
Referee: Mathieu Raynal (France)

Team details

FB	15	Emiliano Boffelli
RW	14	Bautista Delguy
OC	13	Matías Orlando	(substituted off) 65'
IC	12	Bautista Ezcurra	(substituted off) 55'
LW	11	Sebastián Cancelliere
FH	10	Nicolás Sánchez
SH	9	Martín Landajo	(substituted off) 55'
N8	8	Leonardo Senatore
OF	7	Tomás Lezana
BF	6	Pablo Matera	(substituted off) 45'
RL	5	Matías Alemanno	(substituted off) 55'
LL	4	Guido Petti
TP	3	Nahuel Tetaz Chaparro	(substituted off) 63'
HK	2	Agustín Creevy (c)	(substituted off) 48'
LP	1	Javier Díaz	(substituted off) 48'
Replacements:
HK	16	Julián Montoya	(substituted on) 48'
PR	17	Santiago García Botta	(substituted on) 48'
PR	18	Santiago Medrano	(substituted on) 63'
LK	19	Marcos Kremer	(substituted on) 45'
LK	20	Tomás Lavanini	(substituted on) 55'
SH	21	Gonzalo Bertranou	(substituted on) 55'
FH	22	Santiago González Iglesias	(substituted on) 55'
WG	23	Juan Cruz Mallia	(substituted on) 65'
Coach:
(Argentina) Daniel Hourcade

FB	15	Stuart Hogg
RW	14	Dougie Fife
OC	13	Nick Grigg	(substituted off) 58'
IC	12	Peter Horne
LW	11	Blair Kinghorn
FH	10	Adam Hastings	(substituted off) 71'
SH	9	George Horne
N8	8	David Denton
OF	7	Fraser Brown	(substituted off) 58'
BF	6	Magnus Bradbury
RL	5	Grant Gilchrist
LL	4	Tim Swinson	(substituted off) 4'
TP	3	Simon Berghan	(substituted off) 48'
HK	2	Stuart McInally (c)	(substituted off) 65'
LP	1	Allan Dell	(substituted off) 48'
Replacements:
HK	16	George Turner	(substituted on) 65'
PR	17	Jamie Bhatti	(substituted on) 48'
PR	18	Zander Fagerson	(substituted on) 48'
LK	19	Ben Toolis	(substituted on) 4'
FL	20	Jamie Ritchie	(substituted on) 58'
SH	21	Sam Hidalgo-Clyne	(substituted on) 65'
FH	22	James Lang	(substituted on) 71'
CE	23	Chris Harris	(substituted on) 58'
Coach:
(Scotland) Gregor Townsend

Touch judges:
Jaco Peyper (South Africa)
Andrew Brace (Ireland)
Television match official:
Marius Jonker (South Africa)

Notes:

- Bautista Ezcurra and Juan Cruz Mallia (both Argentina) made their international debuts.
- Leonardo Senatore (Argentina) earned his 50th test cap.
- This was Scotland's largest winning margin over Argentina in Argentina.

== See also ==
- 2018 World Rugby Pacific Nations Cup
- 2018 end-of-year rugby union internationals
- 2019 RWC Qualifying – Cross-Regional play-offs
