= 2018 Wales rugby union tour to Argentina and the United States =

- Coach: Warren Gatland
- Tour captain(s): Cory Hill; Ellis Jenkins
- Top test point scorer: Rhys Patchell
Summary
| P | W | D | L |
Total
| 3 | 3 | 0 | 0 |
Test match
| 3 | 3 | 0 | 0 |
Opponent
| P | W | D | L |
Argentina
| 2 | 2 | 0 | 0 |
South Africa
| 1 | 1 | 0 | 0 |

Tour chronology
- ← Pacific Islands 2017 New Zealand 2020 →

In June 2018, Wales played a two-test series against Argentina as part of the 2018 June rugby union tests. It was Wales's first test series against Argentina since their 2006 tour. Ahead of the test series, Wales played South Africa in a one-off test match in Washington, D.C.

== Fixtures ==
| Date | Venue | City | Opponent | Score |
|---|---|---|---|---|
| 2 June 2018 | RFK Stadium | Washington, D.C. | South Africa | 22–20 |
| 9 June 2018 | Estadio del Bicentenario | San Juan | Argentina | 23–10 |
| 16 June 2018 | Estadio Centenario | Resistencia | Argentina | 30–12 |

== Squads ==
Note: Ages, caps and clubs are as per 9 June, the first test match of the tour.

=== Wales ===
On 8 May, head coach Warren Gatland named a 31-man squad for the 2018 Summer Internationals.

On 16 May, Luke Charteris, Tomas Francis and Josh Adams were forced to pull out of the squad due to selection protocols, while Josh Navidi withdrew due to injury. Ashton Hewitt, Rhodri Jones and Aaron Wainwright were called up in their places.

On 27 May, Aaron Shingler and Ashton Hewitt withdrew from the squad due to injury. Josh Turnbull was called up as a replacement.

On 3 June, Steff Evans withdrew from the squad due to injury. Josh Adams and Tomas Francis were recalled to the squad in his place.

Coaching team:

- Head coach: (New Zealand) Warren Gatland
- Backs/Attack coach: (Wales) Rob Howley
- Forwards coach: (Wales) Robin McBryde
- Defence coach: (England) Shaun Edwards

| Player | Position | Date of birth (age) | Caps | Club/province |
|---|---|---|---|---|
| Elliot Dee | Hooker | 7 March 1994 (aged 24) | 8 | (Wales) Dragons |
| Ryan Elias | Hooker | 7 January 1995 (aged 23) | 3 | (Wales) Scarlets |
| Rob Evans | Prop | 14 April 1992 (aged 26) | 25 | (Wales) Scarlets |
| Tomas Francis | Prop | 27 April 1992 (aged 26) | 31 | (England) Exeter Chiefs |
| Rhodri Jones | Prop | 23 December 1991 (aged 26) | 17 | (Wales) Ospreys |
| Wyn Jones | Prop | 26 February 1992 (aged 26) | 9 | (Wales) Scarlets |
| Samson Lee ‡ | Prop | 30 November 1992 (aged 25) | 38 | (Wales) Scarlets |
| Dillon Lewis | Prop | 4 January 1996 (aged 22) | 3 | (Wales) Cardiff Blues |
| Nicky Smith | Prop | 7 April 1994 (aged 24) | 19 | (Wales) Ospreys |
| Adam Beard | Lock | 7 January 1996 (aged 22) | 2 | (Wales) Ospreys |
| Luke Charteris | Lock | 9 March 1983 (aged 35) | 74 | (England) Bath |
| Bradley Davies ‡ | Lock | 9 January 1987 (aged 31) | 63 | (Wales) Ospreys |
| Seb Davies | Lock | 15 May 1996 (aged 22) | 5 | (Wales) Cardiff Blues |
| Cory Hill (c) | Lock | 10 February 1992 (aged 26) | 16 | (Wales) Dragons |
| James Davies | Flanker | 25 October 1990 (aged 27) | 1 | (Wales) Scarlets |
| Ellis Jenkins (c) | Flanker | 29 April 1993 (aged 25) | 7 | (Wales) Cardiff Blues |
| Josh Navidi | Flanker | 30 December 1990 (aged 27) | 11 | (Wales) Cardiff Blues |
| Aaron Shingler | Flanker | 7 August 1987 (aged 30) | 17 | (Wales) Scarlets |
| Josh Turnbull | Flanker | 12 March 1988 (aged 30) | 8 | (Wales) Cardiff Blues |
| Aaron Wainwright | Flanker | 25 September 1997 (aged 20) | 0 | (Wales) Dragons |
| Ross Moriarty | Number 8 | 18 April 1994 (aged 24) | 21 | (England) Gloucester |
| Aled Davies | Scrum-half | 19 July 1992 (aged 25) | 9 | (Wales) Scarlets |
| Gareth Davies ‡ | Scrum-half | 18 August 1990 (aged 27) | 32 | (Wales) Scarlets |
| Tomos Williams | Scrum-half | 1 January 1995 (aged 23) | 1 | (Wales) Cardiff Blues |
| Gareth Anscombe ‡ | Fly-half | 10 May 1991 (aged 27) | 16 | (Wales) Cardiff Blues |
| Rhys Patchell | Fly-half | 17 May 1993 (aged 25) | 8 | (Wales) Scarlets |
| Hadleigh Parkes | Centre | 5 October 1987 (aged 30) | 7 | (Wales) Scarlets |
| Owen Watkin | Centre | 12 October 1996 (aged 21) | 5 | (Wales) Ospreys |
| Scott Williams | Centre | 10 October 1990 (aged 27) | 55 | (Wales) Scarlets |
| Josh Adams | Wing | 21 April 1995 (aged 23) | 2 | (England) Worcester Warriors |
| Steff Evans | Wing | 1 September 1994 (aged 23) | 10 | (Wales) Scarlets |
| Ashton Hewitt | Wing | 20 November 1994 (aged 23) | 0 | (Wales) Dragons |
| George North | Wing | 13 April 1992 (aged 26) | 74 | (England) Northampton Saints |
| Tom Prydie | Wing | 23 February 1992 (aged 26) | 6 | (Wales) Scarlets |
| Hallam Amos ‡ | Fullback | 24 September 1994 (aged 23) | 16 | (Wales) Dragons |

- ‡ – Denotes dual contracted players.

=== Argentina ===
Argentina 30-man squad for their 2018 June rugby union tests against Wales and Scotland.

Coaching team:

- Head coach: (Argentina) Daniel Hourcade
- Defence coach: (Argentina) Pablo Bouza
- Backs coach: (Argentina) Germán Fernández
- Forwards coach: (Argentina) Emiliano Bergamaschi

Note: Flags indicate national union for the club/province as defined by World Rugby.

| Player | Position | Date of birth (age) | Caps | Club/province |
|---|---|---|---|---|
| Agustín Creevy (c) | Hooker | 15 March 1985 (aged 33) | 71 | (Argentina) Jaguares |
| Julián Montoya | Hooker | 29 October 1993 (aged 24) | 41 | (Argentina) Jaguares |
| Javier Díaz | Prop | 26 July 1995 (aged 22) | 0 | (Argentina) Jaguares |
| Santiago García Botta | Prop | 19 June 1992 (aged 25) | 22 | (Argentina) Jaguares |
| Nicolás Leiva | Prop | 18 January 1993 (aged 25) | 0 | (Argentina) Hindú |
| Santiago Medrano | Prop | 6 May 1996 (aged 22) | 0 | (Argentina) Jaguares |
| Nahuel Tetaz Chaparro | Prop | 11 June 1989 (aged 28) | 41 | (Argentina) Jaguares |
| Matías Alemanno | Lock | 5 December 1991 (aged 26) | 41 | (Argentina) Jaguares |
| Marcos Kremer | Lock | 30 July 1997 (aged 20) | 12 | (Argentina) Jaguares |
| Tomás Lavanini | Lock | 22 January 1993 (aged 25) | 38 | (Argentina) Jaguares |
| Guido Petti | Lock | 17 November 1994 (aged 23) | 33 | (Argentina) Jaguares |
| Juan Manuel Leguizamón | Flanker | 6 June 1983 (aged 35) | 82 | (Argentina) Jaguares |
| Tomás Lezana | Flanker | 16 February 1994 (aged 24) | 21 | (Argentina) Jaguares |
| Pablo Matera | Flanker | 18 July 1993 (aged 24) | 46 | (Argentina) Jaguares |
| Javier Ortega Desio | Flanker | 14 June 1990 (aged 27) | 40 | (Argentina) Jaguares |
| Leonardo Senatore | Number 8 | 13 May 1984 (aged 34) | 49 | (Argentina) Jaguares |
| Gonzalo Bertranou | Scrum-half | 31 December 1993 (aged 24) | 9 | (Argentina) Jaguares |
| Tomás Cubelli | Scrum-half | 12 June 1989 (aged 28) | 63 | (Argentina) Jaguares |
| Martín Landajo | Scrum-half | 14 June 1988 (aged 29) | 78 | (Argentina) Jaguares |
| Santiago González Iglesias | Fly-half | 16 June 1988 (aged 29) | 38 | (Argentina) Jaguares |
| Nicolás Sánchez | Fly-half | 26 October 1988 (aged 29) | 62 | (Argentina) Jaguares |
| Jerónimo de la Fuente | Centre | 24 February 1991 (aged 27) | 36 | (Argentina) Jaguares |
| Bautista Ezcurra | Centre | 21 April 1995 (aged 23) | 0 | (Argentina) Jaguares |
| Matías Orlando | Centre | 14 November 1991 (aged 26) | 31 | (Argentina) Jaguares |
| Emiliano Boffelli | Wing | 16 January 1995 (aged 23) | 11 | (Argentina) Jaguares |
| Sebastián Cancelliere | Wing | 17 September 1993 (aged 24) | 3 | (Argentina) Jaguares |
| Juan Cruz Mallia | Wing | 11 September 1996 (aged 21) | 0 | (Argentina) Jaguares |
| Matías Moroni | Wing | 29 March 1991 (aged 27) | 31 | (Argentina) Jaguares |
| Ramiro Moyano | Wing | 28 May 1990 (aged 28) | 20 | (Argentina) Jaguares |
| Bautista Delguy | Fullback | 22 April 1997 (aged 21) | 0 | (Argentina) Jaguares |

== Matches ==
=== Warm-up match ===
2 June 2018
17:00 EDT (UTC-4)

| South Africa | 20–22 | Wales |
| Try: Ismaiel 43' c Mapimpi 58' c Con: Jantjies (2/2) 44', 59'; Pen: Jantjies (1/1) 18'; R. du Preez (1/1) 73' | Report | Try: Amos 30' c Williams 33' c Elias 74' m Con: Anscombe (2/3) 31', 35'; Pen: Anscombe (1/3) 47' |

RFK Stadium, Washington, D.C., United States
Attendance: 21,357
Referee: Matthew Carley (England)

| South Africa | Wales |

| FB | 15 | Curwin Bosch | (substituted off) 31' | (substituted in) 40' | (substituted off) 49' |
| RW | 14 | Travis Ismaiel |
| OC | 13 | Jesse Kriel |
| IC | 12 | André Esterhuizen |
| LW | 11 | Makazole Mapimpi | (substituted off) 76' |
| FH | 10 | Elton Jantjies | (substituted off) 71' |
| SH | 9 | Ivan van Zyl |
| N8 | 8 | Dan du Preez | | | (substituted off) 53' |
| OF | 7 | Oupa Mohojé |
| BF | 6 | Kwagga Smith | 10' to 19' |
| RL | 5 | Pieter-Steph du Toit (c) |
| LL | 4 | Jason Jenkins | (substituted off) 61' |
| TP | 3 | Wilco Louw | (substituted off) 44' |
| HK | 2 | Chiliboy Ralepelle | (substituted off) 52' |
| LP | 1 | Ox Nché | (substituted off) 44' |
Replacements:
| HK | 16 | Akker van der Merwe | (substituted in) 52' |
| PR | 17 | Steven Kitshoff | (substituted in) 44' |
| PR | 18 | Thomas du Toit | (substituted in) 44' |
| LK | 19 | Marvin Orie | (substituted in) 61' |
| FL | 20 | Sikhumbuzo Notshe | (substituted in) 10' | (substituted off) 19' | (substituted in) 53' |
| SH | 21 | Embrose Papier | (substituted in) 76' |
| FH | 22 | Robert du Preez | (substituted in) 61' |
| WG | 23 | Warrick Gelant | (substituted in) 31' | (substituted off) 40' | (substituted in) 49' |
Coach:
(South Africa) Rassie Erasmus

| FB | 15 | Hallam Amos |
| RW | 14 | Tom Prydie |
| OC | 13 | George North |
| IC | 12 | Owen Watkin | (yellow card) 56' |
| LW | 11 | Steff Evans | | (substituted off) 29' |
| FH | 10 | Gareth Anscombe |
| SH | 9 | Tomos Williams | | (substituted off) 78' |
| N8 | 8 | Ross Moriarty |
| OF | 7 | Ellis Jenkins (c) |
| BF | 6 | Seb Davies |
| RL | 5 | Cory Hill |
| LL | 4 | Bradley Davies |
| TP | 3 | Dillon Lewis | | (substituted off) 52' |
| HK | 2 | Elliot Dee | | (substituted off) 70' |
| LP | 1 | Nicky Smith | | (substituted off) 48' |
Replacements:
| HK | 16 | Ryan Elias | | (substituted in) 70' |
| PR | 17 | Wyn Jones | | (substituted in) 48' |
| PR | 18 | Rhodri Jones | | (substituted in) 52' |
| LK | 19 | Adam Beard |
| FL | 20 | Aaron Wainwright |
| SH | 21 | Aled Davies | | (substituted in) 78' |
| FH | 22 | Rhys Patchell |
| CE | 23 | Hadleigh Parkes | | (substituted in) 29' |
Coach:
(New Zealand) Warren Gatland

Man of the Match:
Ellis Jenkins (Wales)

Touch judges:
Alexandre Ruiz (France)
Frank Murphy (Ireland)
Television match official:
David Grashoff (England)

Notes:

- Tomos Williams (Wales) and Robert du Preez, Thomas du Toit, André Esterhuizen, Travis Ismaiel, Jason Jenkins, Makazole Mapimpi, Ox Nché, Sikhumbuzo Notshe, Marvin Orie, Embrose Papier, Kwagga Smith, Akker van der Merwe and Ivan van Zyl (all South Africa) made their international debuts.
- This victory saw Wales record a record third consecutive win against the Springboks, and win for the first time away from home.

=== First test ===
9 June 2018
16:40 ART (UTC-03)

| Argentina | 10–23 | Wales |
| Try: Lezana 77' c Con: González Iglesias (1/1) 77'; Pen: Sánchez (1/1) 1' | | Try: J. Davies 7' c North 26' c Con: Patchell (2/2) 8', 27'; Pen: Patchell (2/3) 35', 44'; Anscombe (1/1) 80' |

Estadio San Juan del Bicentenario, San Juan
Attendance: 23,200
Referee: Andrew Brace (Ireland)

| Argentina | Wales |

| FB | 15 | Emiliano Boffelli |
| RW | 14 | Bautista Delguy | (substituted off) 53' |
| OC | 13 | Matías Orlando |
| IC | 12 | Jerónimo de la Fuente |
| LW | 11 | Ramiro Moyano |
| FH | 10 | Nicolás Sánchez | (substituted off) 40' |
| SH | 9 | Gonzalo Bertranou | (substituted off) 47' |
| N8 | 8 | Javier Ortega Desio |
| OF | 7 | Marcos Kremer |
| BF | 6 | Pablo Matera | (substituted off) 46' |
| RL | 5 | Tomás Lavanini | (substituted off) 67' |
| LL | 4 | Guido Petti |
| TP | 3 | Nahuel Tetaz Chaparro | (substituted off) 64' |
| HK | 2 | Agustín Creevy (c) | (substituted off) 64' |
| LP | 1 | Santiago García Botta | 55' to 57' | | (substituted off) 59' |
Replacements:
| HK | 16 | Julián Montoya | (substituted in) 64' |
| PR | 17 | Javier Díaz | (substituted in) 55' | (substituted off) 57' | (substituted in) 59' |
| PR | 18 | Santiago Medrano | (substituted in) 64' |
| LK | 19 | Matías Alemanno | (substituted in) 67' |
| FL | 20 | Tomás Lezana | (substituted in) 46' |
| SH | 21 | Martín Landajo | (substituted in) 47' |
| FH | 22 | Santiago González Iglesias | (substituted in) 40' |
| WG | 23 | Sebastián Cancelliere | (substituted in) 53' |
Coach:
(Argentina) Daniel Hourcade

| FB | 15 | Hallam Amos |
| RW | 14 | Josh Adams |
| OC | 13 | Scott Williams |
| IC | 12 | Hadleigh Parkes |
| LW | 11 | George North |
| FH | 10 | Rhys Patchell | (substituted off) 59' |
| SH | 9 | Gareth Davies | (substituted off) 59' |
| N8 | 8 | Ross Moriarty |
| OF | 7 | James Davies |
| BF | 6 | Seb Davies | (substituted off) 52' |
| RL | 5 | Cory Hill (c) | (substituted off) 67' |
| LL | 4 | Adam Beard |
| TP | 3 | Dillon Lewis | (substituted off) 52' |
| HK | 2 | Elliot Dee | (substituted off) 59' |
| LP | 1 | Rob Evans | (substituted off) 52' |
Replacements:
| HK | 16 | Ryan Elias | (substituted in) 59' |
| PR | 17 | Nicky Smith | (substituted in) 52' |
| PR | 18 | Tomas Francis | (substituted in) 52' |
| FL | 19 | Josh Turnbull | (substituted in) 67' |
| FL | 20 | Aaron Wainwright | (substituted in) 52' |
| SH | 21 | Aled Davies | (substituted in) 59' |
| FH | 22 | Gareth Anscombe | (substituted in) 59' |
| CE | 23 | Owen Watkin |
Coach:
(New Zealand) Warren Gatland

Man of the Match:
James Davies (Wales)

Touch judges:
Jaco Peyper (South Africa)
Mathieu Raynal (France)
Television match official:
Marius Jonker (South Africa)

Notes:

- Javier Díaz, Bautista Delguy, Santiago Medrano (all Argentina) and Aaron Wainwright (Wales) made their international debuts.
- This was Wales' first victory over Argentina in Argentina since their 35–20 win in 2004.

=== Second test ===
16 June 2018
16:40 ART (UTC-03)

| Argentina | 12–30 | Wales |
| Try: Delguy 38' m Montoya 80' c Con: Sánchez (1/2) 80' | Report | Try: Adams 22' c Amos 55' m Con: Patchell (1/2) 23'; Pen: Patchell (6/7) 8', 15', 33', 37', 41', 51' |

Estadio B.G. Estanislao López, Santa Fe
Attendance: 26,820
Referee: Jaco Peyper (South Africa)

| Argentina | Wales |

| FB | 15 | Emiliano Boffelli |
| RW | 14 | Bautista Delguy |
| OC | 13 | Matías Orlando |
| IC | 12 | Jerónimo de la Fuente | (substituted off) 67' |
| LW | 11 | Ramiro Moyano | (substituted off) 55' |
| FH | 10 | Nicolás Sánchez |
| SH | 9 | Martín Landajo | (substituted off) 51' |
| N8 | 8 | Javier Ortega Desio |
| OF | 7 | Marcos Kremer |
| BF | 6 | Pablo Matera | (substituted off) 48' |
| RL | 5 | Tomás Lavanini | (substituted off) 48' |
| LL | 4 | Guido Petti |
| TP | 3 | Nahuel Tetaz Chaparro | (substituted off) 58' |
| HK | 2 | Agustín Creevy (c) | (substituted off) 48' |
| LP | 1 | Santiago García Botta | (substituted off) 51' |
Replacements:
| HK | 16 | Julián Montoya | (substituted in) 48' |
| PR | 17 | Javier Díaz | (substituted in) 51' |
| PR | 18 | Santiago Medrano | (substituted in) 58' |
| LK | 19 | Matías Alemanno | (substituted in) 48' |
| FL | 20 | Tomás Lezana | (substituted in) 48' |
| SH | 21 | Gonzalo Bertranou | (substituted in) 51' |
| FH | 22 | Santiago González Iglesias | (substituted in) 67' |
| WG | 23 | Sebastián Cancelliere | (substituted in) 55' |
Coach:
(Argentina) Daniel Hourcade

| FB | 15 | Hallam Amos | | (substituted off) 70' |
| RW | 14 | Josh Adams |
| OC | 13 | Scott Williams |
| IC | 12 | Owen Watkin |
| LW | 11 | George North |
| FH | 10 | Rhys Patchell | | (substituted off) 57' |
| SH | 9 | Aled Davies | | (substituted off) 57' |
| N8 | 8 | Ross Moriarty | (red card) 80' |
| OF | 7 | James Davies | | (substituted off) 70' |
| BF | 6 | Ellis Jenkins |
| RL | 5 | Cory Hill (c) |
| LL | 4 | Adam Beard | | (substituted off) 60' |
| TP | 3 | Tomas Francis | | (substituted off) 57' |
| HK | 2 | Ryan Elias | | (substituted off) 60' |
| LP | 1 | Rob Evans | | (substituted off) 64' |
Replacements:
| HK | 16 | Elliot Dee | | (substituted in) 60' |
| PR | 17 | Nicky Smith | | (substituted in) 64' |
| PR | 18 | Dillon Lewis | | (substituted in) 57' |
| LK | 19 | Bradley Davies | | (substituted in) 60' |
| FL | 20 | Josh Turnbull | | (substituted in) 70' |
| SH | 21 | Tomos Williams | | (substituted in) 57' |
| FH | 22 | Gareth Anscombe | | (substituted in) 57' |
| WG | 23 | Tom Prydie | | (substituted in) 70' |
Coach:
(New Zealand) Warren Gatland

Touch judges:
Mathieu Raynal (France)
Andrew Brace (Ireland)
Television match official:
Marius Jonker (South Africa)

Notes:

- This win saw Wales claim their first series victory over Argentina since 1999.

== See also ==
- 2018 June rugby union tests
- History of rugby union matches between Argentina and Wales
- History of rugby union matches between South Africa and Wales
