= Blair Kinghorn =

Scotland international rugby union player

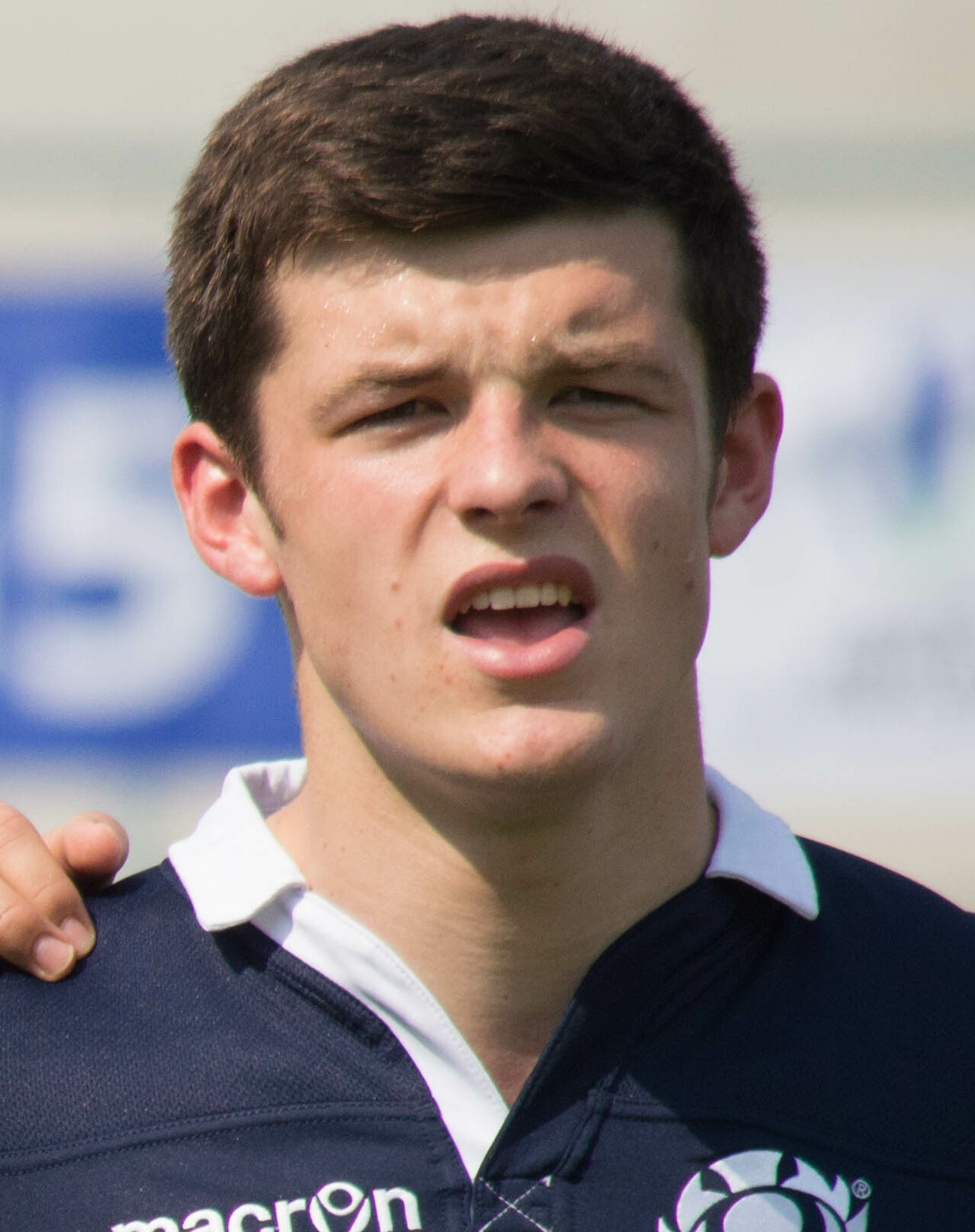
- Kinghorn representing Scotland during the World Rugby Under 20 Championship
- Full name: Blair Simon Kinghorn
- Born: 18 January 1997 (age 29) Edinburgh, Scotland
- Height: 1.94 m (6 ft 4 in)
- Weight: 107 kg (236 lb; 16 st 12 lb)
- School: Edinburgh Academy
- Notable relative: Gregor Brown (cousin)

Rugby union career
- Position(s): Fullback, Fly-half, Wing
- Current team: Toulouse
Senior career
Years	Team	Apps	(Points)
2015–2023	Edinburgh	142	(329)
2023–	Toulouse	64	(200)
- Correct as of 1 November 2026
International career
Years	Team	Apps	(Points)
2015–2017	Scotland U20	15	(36)
2017	Scotland 7s	12	(7)
2018–	Scotland	70	(146)
2022	Scotland 'A'	1	(0)
2025	British & Irish Lions	2	(0)
- Correct as of 18 November 2026

Blair Simon Kinghorn (born 18 January 1997) is a Scottish professional rugby union player who plays as a fullback for Top 14 club Toulouse and the Scotland national team.

== Early years ==
Kinghorn was born and raised in Edinburgh. Having earlier played football, he focused on rugby from age 15.

== Club career ==
=== Edinburgh ===
Edinburgh signed Kinghorn on a two-year professional contract straight from Edinburgh Academy.

He made his professional debut as a 70th-minute substitute in Edinburgh's match against Zebre in the 2015–16 Pro12. He scored his first try for the club the following season against Benetton, going on to score a total of 36 tries for Edinburgh, leaving him currently fourth in the list of most tries scored for the club. In total, Kinghorn scored 327 points for Edinburgh with 19 penalties and 45 conversions to go with his impressive try haul.

He had 139 Caps for Edinburgh with a very impressive 86% start rate (122 starts, 17 appearances as a replacement and only 3 not used when selected in the match day 23). He is currently the youngest player to have reached 100 caps for Edinburgh, having achieved this at aged 24 years and 117 days.

=== Toulouse ===
Kinghorn left Edinburgh to join Toulouse in December 2023, with his new club paying a six-figure fee to buy out the 26-year-old’s contract which was due to expire in June 2024. Kinghorn scored two tries on his Toulouse debut on 9 December 2023 against Cardiff in the Champions Cup.

Kinghorn performed well for Stade Toulousain, by the 2023/24 Champions Cup Final Kinghorn earned the starting position over teammate and French international Thomas Ramos, as he scored 12 points from the tee and made a crucial tackle to stop a breakaway try, helping Toulouse to their 6th European Title which they won in extra time.

During Kinghorn's time at Toulouse to date, the team have won both the 2023-24 and 2024-25 Top 14 championships.

== International career ==
=== Youth ===
Kinghorn represented Edinburgh at under-17, under-18 and under-20 level and Scotland at under-18 and under-20 level.

Kinghorn was a National Youth League Cup winner with Currie at under-16 level and formerly a member of Heart of Midlothian's Youth Academy.

He said: "When I was younger, football was my main interest, then I started to play rugby at school. Some of my mates went to play for Currie so I went along with them, then things escalated at under-16 level. I began playing for the school first XV and since then it's been my goal to play professionally."

=== Scotland ===
In January 2018 he was called up to the senior Scotland squad for the 2018 Six Nations Championship.

He went on to make his debut at Murrayfield in a 25-13 win against England.

He then went on to earn his first international start, on the wing, in a 28-8 loss to Ireland. He scored Scotland's only try of the match. He played in all three matches during his first tour with Scotland - to the Americas in the summer of 2018 - scoring tries against the USA and Argentina.

In Scotland's 2019 Six Nations campaign he scored three tries in their first match against Italy. He scored another hat trick against Italy in the 2023 Six Nations, also scoring against Wales earlier in the tournament.

Kinghorn was selected in the 31-man squad for the 2019 Rugby World Cup in Japan. In 2023, Kinghorn was selected in the 33-player squad for the 2023 Rugby World Cup in France.

=== British and Irish Lions ===
In May 2025 Kinghorn was selected by Head Coach Andy Farrell for the 2025 British & Irish Lions tour to Australia. Having arrived late for the tour after playing in the Top 14 final victory for Toulouse, he made his debut in the third tour match in Australia, a 10-21 victory over NSW Waratahs, becoming Lion #882. In July 2025, he was replaced in the first half of another warm up fixture, this time, against the Brumbies after sustaining an ankle injury.

He was subsequently selected on the bench for the second test. He entered the field as a replacement and contributed strongly to the Lions' comeback victory, which secured an unassailable 2-0 series lead.

== Career statistics ==
=== List of international tries ===
No.	Date	Venue	Opponent	Score	Result	Competition
1	10 March 2018	Aviva Stadium, Dublin, Ireland	Ireland	8–21	8–28	2018 Six Nations Championship
2	16 June 2018	BBVA Compass Stadium, Houston, Texas, United States	United States	5–0	29–30	2018 June rugby union tests
3	23 June 2018	Estadio Centenario, Resistencia, Argentina	Argentina	12–0	44–15	2018 June rugby union tests
4	2 February 2019	Murrayfield Stadium, Edinburgh, Scotland	Italy	5–3	33–20	2019 Six Nations Championship
5	2 February 2019	Murrayfield Stadium, Edinburgh, Scotland	Italy	10–3	33–20	2019 Six Nations Championship
6	2 February 2019	Murrayfield Stadium, Edinburgh, Scotland	Italy	24–3	33–20	2019 Six Nations Championship
7	6 September 2019	Murrayfield Stadium, Edinburgh, Scotland	Georgia	10–3	36–9	2019 Rugby World Cup warm-up matches
8	23 October 2020	Murrayfield Stadium, Edinburgh, Scotland	Georgia	46–7	48–7	2020 end-of-year rugby union internationals
9	29 October 2022	Murrayfield Stadium, Edinburgh, Scotland	Australia	10–6	15–16	2022 end-of-year rugby union internationals
10	11 February 2023	Murrayfield Stadium, Edinburgh, Scotland	Wales	30–7	35–7	2023 Six Nations Championship
11	18 March 2023	Murrayfield Stadium, Edinburgh, Scotland	Italy	10–6	26–14	2023 Six Nations Championship
12	18 March 2023	Murrayfield Stadium, Edinburgh, Scotland	Italy	17–6	26–14	2023 Six Nations Championship
13	18 March 2023	Murrayfield Stadium, Edinburgh, Scotland	Italy	24–14	26–14	2023 Six Nations Championship
14	24 September 2023	Stade de Nice, Nice, France	Tonga	36–17	45–17	2023 Rugby World Cup
15	8 March 2025	Murrayfield Stadium, Edinburgh, Scotland	Wales	5-0	35–29	2025 Six Nations Championship
16	8 March 2025	Murrayfield Stadium, Edinburgh, Scotland	Wales	33–7	35–29	2025 Six Nations Championship

as of 9 May 2025

== Honours ==
Toulouse

- European Rugby Champions Cup: 2024
- Top 14 Winner : 2024, 2025, 2026

== Personal life ==
As of 2025, Kinghorn was engaged to Dina Celina, a nutritionist.
