= Jorden Sandover-Best =

Canada international rugby union player

Jordan
- Full name: Jorden Kevan Sandover-Best
- Born: October 19, 1994 (age 32)
- Height: 5 ft 7 in (170 cm)
- Weight: 167 lb (76 kg)
- School: Robert Bateman Secondary

Rugby union career
- Position: Scrum-half
International career
Years	Team	Apps	(Points)
2018	Canada	1	(0)
Medal record
Men's rugby sevens
Representing Canada
World Games
Bronze medal – third place	2013 Cali	Team competition

Jorden Kevan Sandover-Best (born October 19, 1994) is a Canadian rugby union player.

A native of Abbotsford, British Columbia, Sandover-Best was educated at Robert Bateman Secondary.

Sandover-Best, a scrum-half, won a bronze medal with Canada's rugby sevens team at the 2013 World Games in Colombia and was a member of the Canada under-20s for two editions of the Junior World Rugby Trophy. He played in five consecutive British Columbia Premier League championships competing with the UBC Thunderbirds and then UBC Old Boys Ravens. In 2018, Sandover-Best was capped for Canada in a match against Russia in Ottawa.

== See also ==
- List of Canada national rugby union players
