= Ryan Elias =

Welsh rugby union player (born 1995)

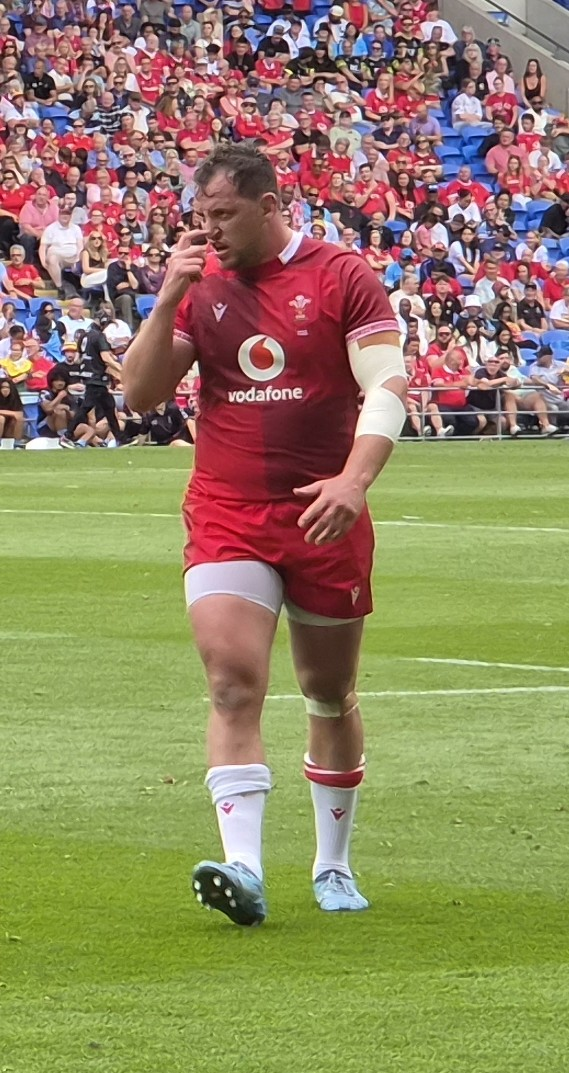
- 2026 Nations Championship
- Born: Ryan James Elias; 7 January 1995 (age 31) Carmarthen, Wales
- Height: 1.85 m (6 ft 1 in)
- Weight: 112 kg (247 lb; 17 st 9 lb)
- School: Bro Myrddin Welsh Comprehensive School

Rugby union career
- Position: Hooker
- Current team: Scarlets
Senior career
Years	Team	Apps	(Points)
2013–	Scarlets	188	(50)
- Correct as of 18 November 2026
International career
Years	Team	Apps	(Points)
2014–2015	Wales U20	8	(0)
2017–	Wales	48	(20)
- Correct as of 18 November 2026

Ryan James Elias (born 7 January 1995) is a Welsh professional rugby union player who plays as a hooker for United Rugby Championship club Scarlets and the Wales national team.

== Club career ==
=== Carmarthen Athletic and Quins ===
Elias played youth rugby for Carmarthen Athletic, where his grandfather once served as club chairman. He later made the switch to rivals Carmarthen Quins, while progressing through the Scarlets academy.

=== Scarlets ===
Elias made his professional debut for the Scarlets on 17 November 2013, against the Saracens.

With first choice hooker and fellow Bro Myrddin graduate Ken Owens injured, Elias started the semi-final against Leinster and final against Munster, winning the 2016–17 Pro12 title with the Scarlets.

Elias made his 100th appearance for the Scarlets on 5 January 2019, with a win against the Dragons. Elias extended this contract in April 2021.

He made his 150th appearance for the club on 17 December 2022, against the Cheetahs in the Challenge Cup. Elias signed an extension with the Scarlets on 14 April 2023.

Elias’s 200th appearance came at the start of the 2026-27 United Rugby Championship, having also been named as vice-captain for the season.

== International career ==
=== Wales U18 and U20 ===
Elias featured for Wales U18 in 2013, and progressed into the Wales U20 ranks in 2014, making eight appearances for the team.

=== Wales ===
In May 2017 Elias was named in the Wales senior squad for the tests against Tonga and Samoa in June 2017.

He made his debut on 16 June 2017, off the bench against Tonga at Eden Park and started the next test against Samoa.

In his third test appearance, Elias came off the bench against South Africa on 2 June 2018, scoring a late try to put Wales in the lead and ultimately secure the win.

Elias won the Grand Slam with Wales in the 2019 Six Nations, appearing off the bench against Italy, as Wales won their 11th match in a row.

Having been named in the Wales squad for the 2019 Rugby World Cup, Elias made one appearance, starting in the win against Uruguay.

Often shifting between a starting position and the bench, Elias was named to start all four of Wales's fixtures in the 2021 end-of-year rugby union internationals. He scored three tries, including a brace against Fiji. He retained the starting hooker position for the 2022 Six Nations, starting four of the five matches.

Elias started all three of the tests during the 2022 mid-year rugby union tests, as Wales secured a first ever win in South Africa. He made three appearances off the bench during the 2022 end-of-year rugby union internationals, and was yellow carded in the final match against Australia.

Elias missed the 2023 Six Nations Championship with an Achilles injury. He returned to the squad for the 2023 Rugby World Cup.

Elias was named in the squad for the 2026 Six Nations by Steve Tandy. Elias came off the bench as Wales beat New Zealand for the first time in 73 years, meaning he has beaten South Africa, Australia, and New Zealand in senior international fixtures.

== Career statistics ==
=== List of international tries ===
No.	Date	Venue	Opponent	Score	Result	Competition
1	2 June 2018	Robert F. Kennedy Memorial Stadium, Washington, D.C., United States	South Africa	22–20	22–20	2018 Wales rugby union tour to Argentina and the United States
2	14 November 2021	Millennium Stadium, Cardiff, Wales	Fiji	5–10	38–23	2021 end-of-year rugby union internationals
3	14 November 2021	Millennium Stadium, Cardiff, Wales	Fiji	19–23	38–23	2021 end-of-year rugby union internationals
4	20 November 2021	Millennium Stadium, Cardiff, Wales	Australia	11–10	29–28	2021 end-of-year rugby union internationals

as of 20 November 2021
