= Peyo Muscarditz =

French rugby union footballer

- Full name: Peyo Muscarditz
- Born: 2 January 1996 (age 30) Oloron-Sainte-Marie, France
- Height: 1.75 m (5 ft 9 in)
- Weight: 85 kg (187 lb)

Rugby union career
- Position: Centre
- Current team: Bayonne
Amateur team(s)
Years	Team	Apps	(Points)
- Aramits
–	Bayonne		
Senior career
Years	Team	Apps	(Points)
2017–	Bayonne	117	(55)
- Correct as of 12 March 2024

Peyo Muscarditz (born 2 January 1996) is a French rugby union player who plays for Bayonne in the Top 14 and the French national team. His position is centre.

== Honours ==
=== Club ===
(France) Bayonne

- Pro D2: 2018–19
