= James Davies (rugby union) =

Wales international rugby union player

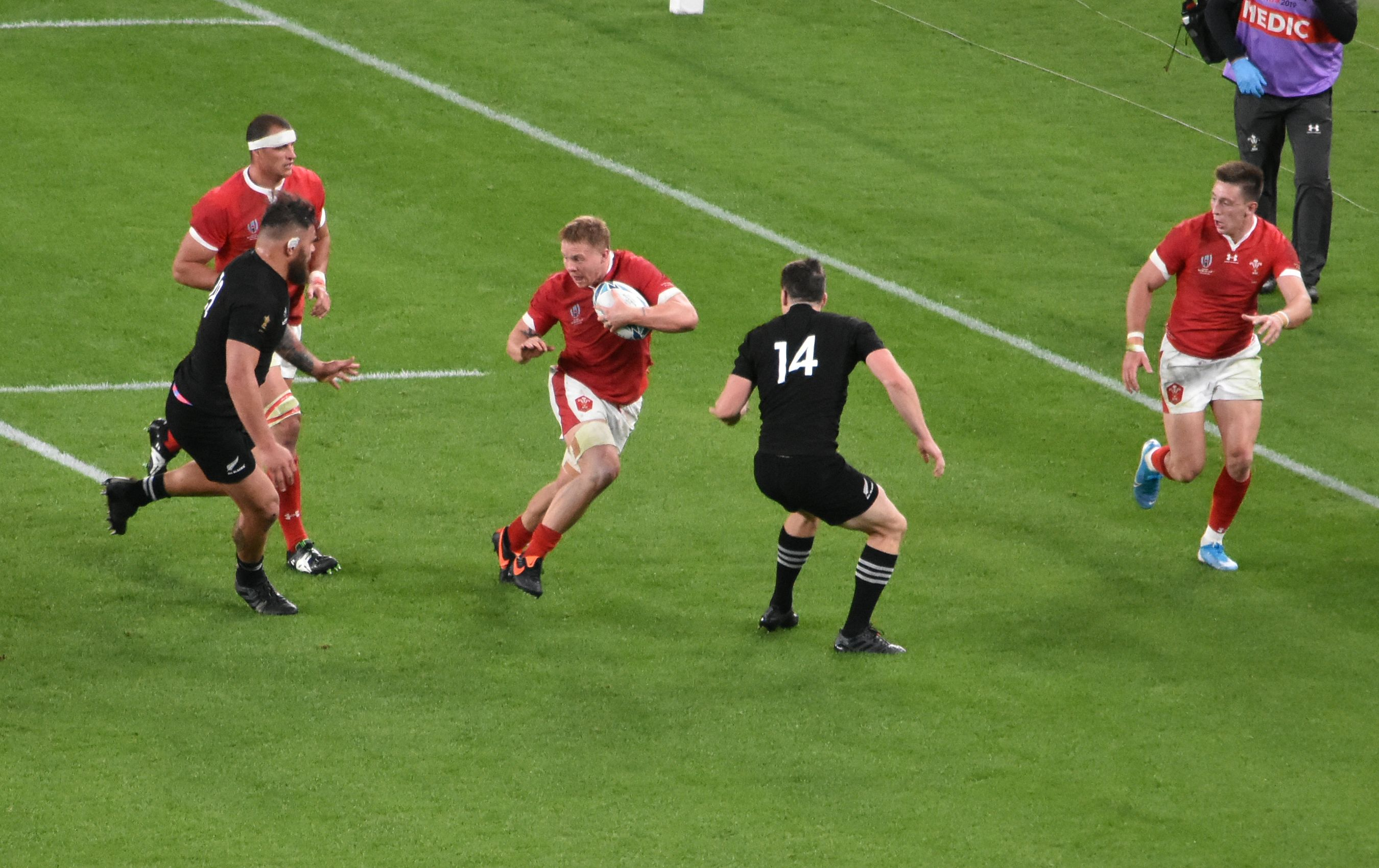
- Davies in action against New Zealand at the 2019 Rugby World Cup
- Born: 25 October 1990 (age 36) Carmarthen, Wales
- Height: 1.81 m (5 ft 11 in)
- Weight: 93 kg (15 st; 205 lb)
- Notable relative: Jonathan Davies (brother)

Rugby union career
- Position: Openside Flanker
- Current team: Scarlets
Senior career
Years	Team	Apps	(Points)
2011–2015	Carmarthen Quins	59	(65)
2013–2022	Scarlets	103	(90)
International career
Years	Team	Apps	(Points)
2018–2020	Wales	11	(5)
National sevens teams
Years	Team		Comps
2013–14	Wales 7s		17
2016	Great Britain 7s		4
- Correct as of 20:58, 11 January 2016 (UTC)
Medal record
Men's rugby sevens
Representing Great Britain
Olympic Games
Silver medal – second place	2016 Rio de Janeiro	Team competition

James Davies (born 25 October 1990) is a Welsh former rugby union player who last played for the Scarlets as a flanker. He has also represented Wales Sevens and was part of the Great Britain squad that played in the Rugby Sevens tournament at the 2016 Summer Olympics.

== Club career ==
=== Scarlets ===
Davies made his debut for the Scarlets in 2014 making 23 appearances in his debut season, 16 in the Pro12, scoring four tries and winning four man of the match awards. During the 2016–17 Pro12, Davies was named as man of the match in the semi final win over Leinster. He scored the Scarlets final try in the 2017 Pro12 Grand Final, as the Scarlets beat Munster 46-22.

In April 2022, it was announced that Davies would retire from rugby with immediate effect due to concussion. His final rugby match was Wales vs Georgia in October 2020.

== International career ==
=== Wales ===
In January 2018, Davies was called up to the senior Wales squad for the 2018 Six Nations Championship. He made his international debut on 11 March 2018 against Italy. Davies was selected for the 2018 Wales rugby union tour to Argentina and the United States, and won back-to-back man of the match awards.

=== Great Britain Sevens ===
Davies represented Great Britain in the 2016 Summer Olympics, and won a silver medal.

== Personal life ==
His brother is Jonathan Davies, who also plays professional rugby union as a centre for Scarlets and Wales. His nickname is "Cubby", in reference to his brother's nickname, "Fox"; this refers to the Fox & Hounds pub their parents ran in Bancyfelin, the village where they grew up.

After retirement, he joined the Scarlets backroom staff as a recruitment manager. Davies was credited for spotting Ellis Mee for the Scarlets, and deemed ‘influential’ in the signing of Blair Murray.

== International tries ==
Try	Opponent	Location	Venue	Competition	Date	Result
1	Argentina	San Juan, Argentina	Estadio San Juan	2018 Summer Tour	9 June 2018	Win
