= Tomos Williams =

Welsh rugby union player (born 1995)

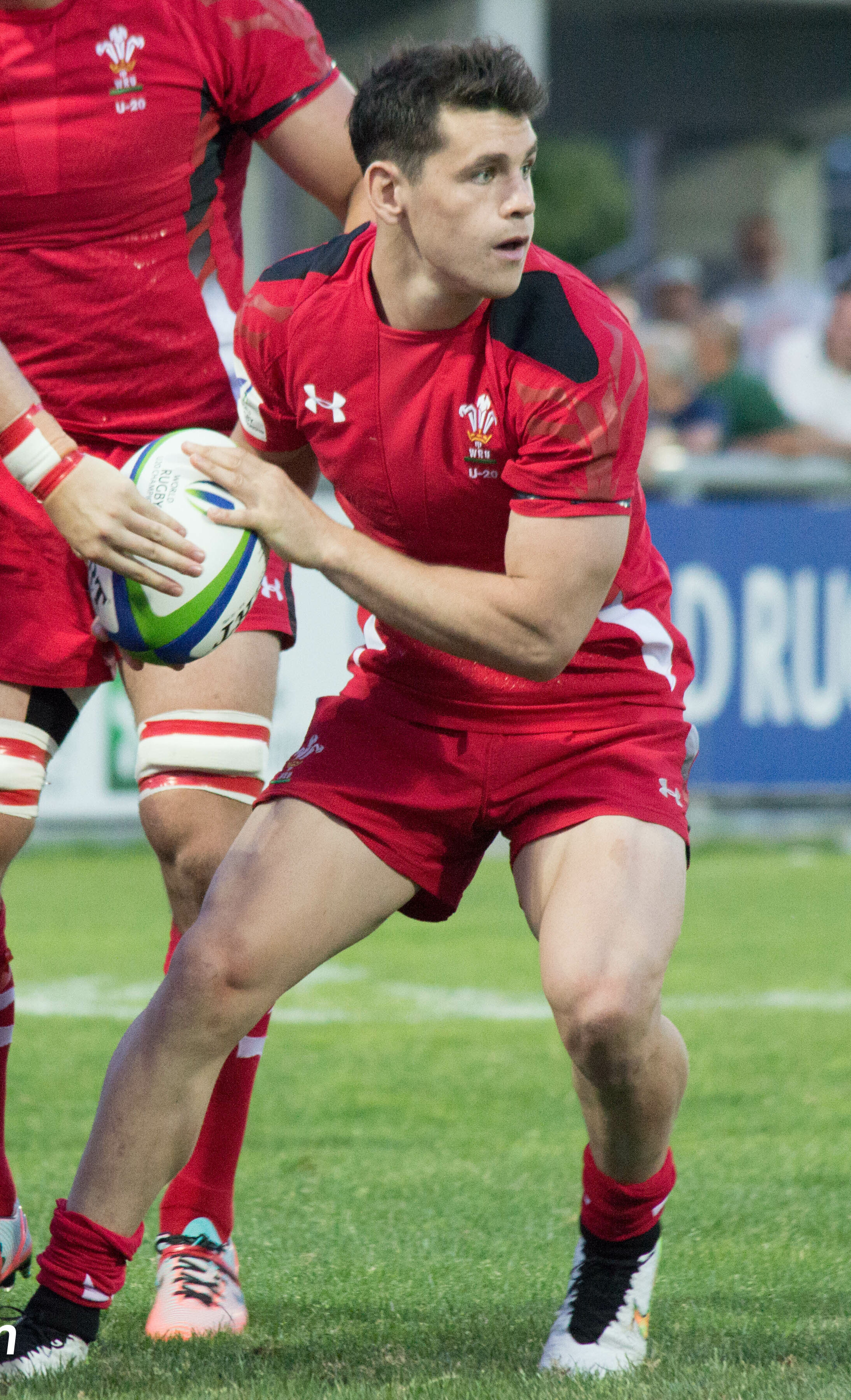
- Full name: Tomos Geraint Williams
- Born: 1 January 1995 (age 31) Treorchy, Wales
- Height: 1.78 m (5 ft 10 in)
- Weight: 77 kg (170 lb; 12 st 2 lb)
- School: Treorchy Comprehensive School

Rugby union career
- Position: Scrum-half
- Current team: Saracens
Senior career
| Years | Team | Apps | (Points) |
| 2014–2024 | Cardiff | 146 | (138) |
| 2024–2026 | Gloucester | 32 | (61) |
| 2026– | Saracens | 5 | (0) |
- Correct as of 18 November 2026
International career
| Years | Team | Apps | (Points) |
| 2014–2015 | Wales U20 | 18 | (15) |
| 2014–2015 | Wales 7s | 29 | (87) |
| 2018– | Wales | 77 | (80) |
| 2025 | British and Irish Lions | 0 | (0) |
- Correct as of 14 November 2026

Tomos Geraint Williams (born 1 January 1995) is a Welsh professional rugby union player who plays as a scrum-half for Premiership Rugby club Saracens and the Wales national team.

== Club career ==
Williams, a Cardiff academy graduate, made his senior debut as a replacement against Munster in 2013. He would make several more appearances as a replacement before his first Cardiff start in a 23–13 win over Ulster. His breakthrough season came in 2016–17, making 30 appearances over the campaign. This included a first Cardiff try against Edinburgh on the opening day of the season, and a first brace in an away defeat to Leinster.

Williams scored a try for Cardiff in the Challenge Cup final victory over Gloucester in 2018, which was later voted the Try of the Season.

On 1 June 2021, Williams signed a contract extension with Cardiff.

On 8 January 2024, Williams would leave Cardiff to join English side Gloucester in the Premiership Rugby from the 2024–25 season. Following his first season at the club he won the Premiership Rugby Player of the Season award.

In August 2025, ahead of the 2025–26 season, Williams was given the club captaincy replacing Lewis Ludlow.

In December 2025, it was announced that Williams would be leaving Gloucester to join Saracens at the end of the 2025-26 season.

== International career ==
=== Wales ===
Williams won Welsh caps at U18 level from Coleg y Cymoedd and then made 18 appearances at U20 level over two seasons. He made his Wales Sevens debut as a 19-year-old in the Japan leg of the 2013–14 IRB Sevens World Series and went on to play in tournaments on the Gold Coast, in South Africa, and Dubai.

In May 2017, Williams was named in the Wales senior squad for the first time for the tests against Tonga and Samoa. He sat on the bench for the game against Samoa in Apia, but his international bow didn't come until a year later on the summer tour to the USA and Argentina when he scored a vital try in the 22–20 win over South Africa at the RFK Stadium in Washington DC.

He was again on the score sheet when he was selected for his next start in the 2018 autumn triumph over Tonga and he claimed another try on his Six Nations debut as Wales battled back to beat France in Paris on 1 February 2019. He was injured during the match and did not make any further appearances during the tournament.

In September 2019, Williams was selected as part of the Wales squad for the 2019 World Cup. He replaced Gareth Davies in the first pool game against Georgia and scored his first World Cup try within 20 minutes of his introduction. Williams appeared in every Wales game from the bench, scoring a further try in the final pool game against Uruguay.

In January 2024, Williams was selected for the 2024 Six Nations. He was a substitute for the match against Scotland, and came on in the second half. He started the remaining four matches.

Williams was selected for the 2025 Six Nations. He started all of Wales' matches.

Williams was named in the squad for the 2025 end-of-year rugby union internationals. He started against Argentina, Japan and New Zealand. Williams scored a try against Argentina.

Williams was named in the squad for the 2026 Six Nations by Steve Tandy.

=== British and Irish Lions ===
On 8 May 2025, Williams was selected for the British and Irish Lions for their 2025 tour to Australia during the summer.

He scored two tries against the Western Force before sustaining a hamstring injury ruling him out for the rest of the tour.

== Personal life ==
Prior to concentrating on rugby, Williams played basketball, representing Wales in grade-age tournaments. He switched to rugby fully at 18, when he joined the Cardiff academy.

== Career statistics ==
=== List of international tries ===
| No. | Date | Venue | Opponent | Score | Result | Competition |
|---|---|---|---|---|---|---|
| 1 | 2 June 2018 | Robert F. Kennedy Memorial Stadium, Washington, D.C., United States | South Africa | 12–3 | 22–20 | 2018 Wales rugby union tour to Argentina and the United States |
| 2 | 17 November 2018 | Millennium Stadium, Cardiff, Wales | Tonga | 41–24 | 74–24 | 2018 end-of-year rugby union internationals |
| 3 | 1 February 2019 | Stade de France, Paris, France | France | 5–16 | 24–19 | 2019 Six Nations Championship |
| 4 | 23 September 2019 | Toyota Stadium, Toyota, Japan | Georgia | 34–7 | 43–14 | 2019 Rugby World Cup |
| 5 | 13 October 2019 | Egao Kenko Stadium, Kumamoto, Japan | Uruguay | 26–13 | 35–13 | 2019 Rugby World Cup |
| 6 | 8 February 2020 | Lansdowne Road, Dublin, Ireland | Ireland | 5–5 | 14–24 | 2020 Six Nations Championship |
| 7 | 3 July 2021 | Millennium Stadium, Cardiff, Wales | Canada | 5–5 | 68–12 | 2021 July rugby union tests |
| 8 | 3 July 2021 | Millennium Stadium, Cardiff, Wales | Canada | 52–5 | 68–12 | 2021 July rugby union tests |
| 9 | 10 July 2021 | Millennium Stadium, Cardiff, Wales | Argentina | 18–20 | 20–20 | 2021 July rugby union tests |
| 10 | 12 November 2022 | Millennium Stadium, Cardiff, Wales | Argentina | 15–6 | 20–13 | 2022 end-of-year rugby union internationals |
| 11 | 18 March 2023 | Stade de France, Saint-Denis, France | France | 19–34 | 28–41 | 2023 Six Nations Championship |
| 12 | 12 August 2023 | Twickenham Stadium, London, England | England | 15–9 | 17–19 | 2023 Rugby World Cup warm-up matches |
| 13 | 14 October 2023 | Stade Vélodrome, Marseille, France | Argentina | 15–12 | 17–29 | 2023 Rugby World Cup |
| 14 | 10 March 2024 | Millennium Stadium, Cardiff, Wales | France | 15–13 | 24–45 | 2024 Six Nations Championship |
| 15 | 8 March 2025 | Murrayfield Stadium, Edinburgh, Scotland | Scotland | 20–35 | 29–35 | 2025 Six Nations Championship |
| 16 | 9 November 2025 | Millennium Stadium, Cardiff, Wales | Argentina | 5–14 | 28–52 | 2025 end-of-year rugby union internationals |

as of 9 November 2025
