= Guram Shengelia =

Georgia international rugby union player

- Born: 10 October 1992 (age 34) Tbilisi, Georgia
- Height: 1.95 m (6 ft 5 in)
- Weight: 110 kg (17 st 5 lb)

Rugby union career
- Position: Flanker
Senior career
Years	Team	Apps	(Points)
2014-	Jiki	54	(25)
- Correct as of 29/04/2017
International career
Years	Team	Apps	(Points)
2018-	Georgia	2	(0)
- Correct as of 19 April 2018

Guram Shengelia (born October 10, 1992) is a Georgian rugby union player. His position is flanker, and he currently plays for Jiki Gori in the Didi 10 and the Georgia national rugby union team.
