= Hallam Amos =

Wales international rugby union player

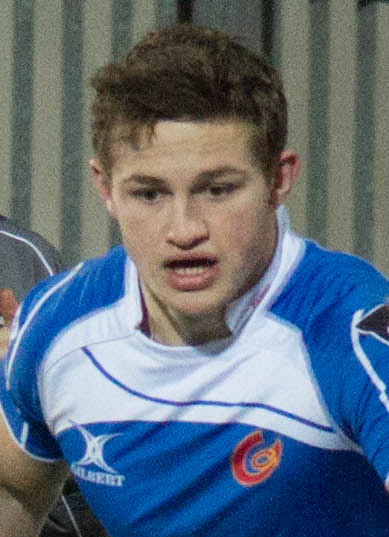
- Born: Hallam Benjamen Amos; 24 September 1994 (age 32) Stockport, England
- Height: 1.86 m (6 ft 1 in)
- Weight: 96 kg (212 lb; 15 st 2 lb)
- School: Monmouth School
- University: Cardiff University

Rugby union career
- Position(s): Fullback; Wing
Senior career
Years	Team	Apps	(Points)
2011-2012	Newport RFC	4	(5)
2011-2019	Dragons	115	(180)
2019-2022	Cardiff Rugby	32	(30)
- Correct as of 15 October 2021
International career
Years	Team	Apps	(Points)
–	Wales U16		
–	Wales U18		
2013	Wales U20	6	(10)
2013–2021	Wales	25	(30)
- Correct as of 15:24, 15 October 2021 (UTC)

Hallam Benjamen Amos (born 24 September 1994) is a Welsh former rugby union player who played for Cardiff Rugby and Newport Gwent Dragons. He mostly played as a wing, but he was also capable of playing at fullback and as a centre. In October 2021, Amos announced his retirement from professional rugby union to focus on his medical career.

Born in Stockport, England, he came through the Newport Gwent Dragons academy and made his professional debut for the region in October 2011 at the age of 17 years and 28 days, briefly making him the youngest player to appear for one of the four Welsh regional sides. After eight years with the Dragons, during which time he made 115 appearances, he moved to the Cardiff Blues in 2019.

Amos also represented Wales in international rugby. After playing at under-16 and under-18 level, he played for the under-20s in the 2013 Six Nations Under 20s Championship, before making his full international debut later that year, against Tonga in the 2013 Autumn internationals. He scored his first international try in Wales' opening game at the 2015 Rugby World Cup, a 54–9 win over Uruguay. During his rugby career, he earned a total of 25 international caps, scoring six tries.

== Playing career ==
=== Club rugby ===
Amos made his debut for the Newport Gwent Dragons against Wasps in the Anglo-Welsh Cup on 22 October 2011, aged 17 years and 28 days. In doing so, Amos broke the record for the youngest player to play Welsh regional rugby held by Kristian Phillips of the Ospreys. Amos also scored a try on his debut.

On 21 March 2019, Cardiff Blues announced that Amos would be joining the squad for the 2019–20 season. In October 2021, Amos announced that he would be retiring from professional rugby union at the end of the 2021–22 season, at the age of 27, to focus on his medical career.

=== International career ===
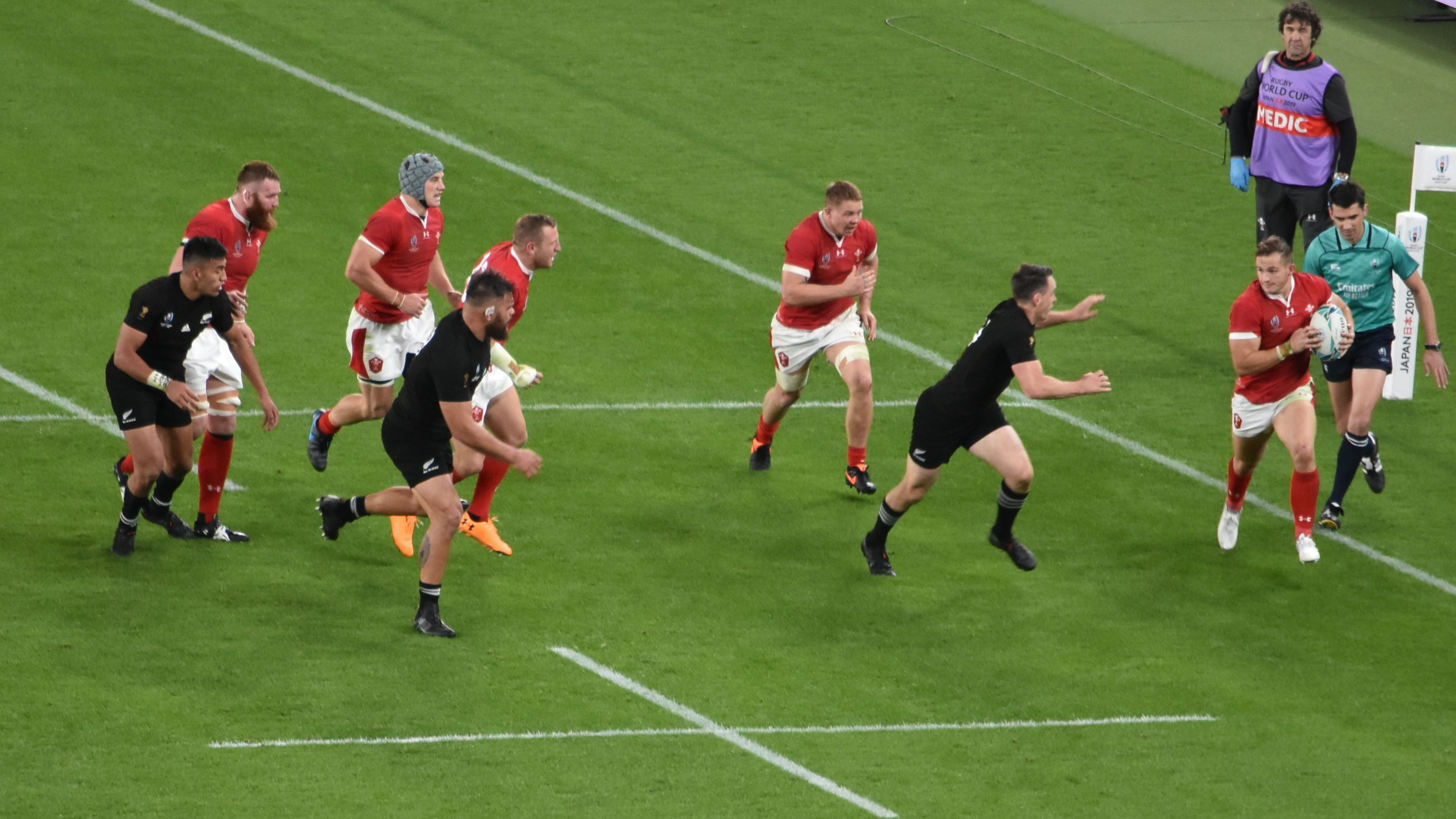
Hallam Amos (right) in action against New Zealand at the 2019 Rugby World Cup

In January 2013 Amos was selected in the Wales Under 20 squad for the 2013 Under 20 Six Nations Championship, having previously played for Wales Under 16 and Wales Under 18. That summer he played in the Under 20 World Cup, where Wales reached the final.

In November 2013 Amos was called up to the senior Wales squad for the Autumn international series matches. He made his full international debut on the wing versus Tonga on 22 November 2013. Amos was narrowly denied a try by his right foot being in touch.

In September 2015, Amos was selected in the Wales squad for the 2015 Rugby World Cup, where he scored his first international try in Wales' opening game against Uruguay. A week later he played in the victory against England, but a shoulder injury in this match meant he could play no further part in the tournament.

In April 2018, Amos was selected as a member of the Commonwealth Games squad to play in the Gold Coast for the Wales Rugby Sevens team. Amos was involved in the 2019 Six Nations Championship, where Wales won the Grand Slam.

In September 2019, Amos was selected in the Wales squad for the 2019 Rugby World Cup. He played in the bronze medal match against New Zealand, scoring Wales' opening try.

In Wales' victorious campaign in the 2021 Six Nations Championship, Amos started their opening match against Ireland.

Alongside Shane Williams and Gareth Thomas, Amos is one of only three Welshmen to have scored international Test tries against New Zealand, South Africa, Australia and Argentina.

=== International tries ===
Try	Opponent	Location	Venue	Competition	Date	Result
1	Uruguay	Cardiff, Wales	Millennium Stadium	2015 Rugby World Cup	20 September 2015	Win
2	Australia	Cardiff, Wales	Millennium Stadium	2017 Autumn internationals	11 November 2017	Loss
3	Georgia	Cardiff, Wales	Millennium Stadium	2017 Autumn internationals	18 November 2017	Win
4	South Africa	Washington, D.C., USA	RFK Stadium	2018 Summer tour	2 June 2018	Win
5	Argentina	San Juan, Argentina	Estadio San Juan	2018 Summer tour	9 June 2018	Win
6	New Zealand	Yokohama, Japan	International Stadium Yokohama	2019 Rugby World Cup	1 November 2019	Loss

== Personal life ==
Amos studied medicine at the Cardiff University School of Medicine, following in the footsteps of both his doctor parents and other Welsh international rugby players such as J. P. R. Williams and Jamie Roberts. During his studies at Cardiff, he completed an intercalated degree in Neuroscience, in which he achieved First Class Honours.
