= Javier Díaz (rugby union) =

Argentine rugby union player (born 1995)

- Born: 26 July 1995 (age 31) Argentina
- Height: 6 ft 0 in (1.83 m)
- Weight: 225 lb (102 kg; 16 st 1 lb)

Rugby union career
- Position: Prop
Senior career
Years	Team	Apps	(Points)
2015–2018	Natación	4	(0)
2019	Jaguares XV	6	(0)
2021	Olimpia Lions	4	(0)
2021−	Valorugby Emilia		
- Correct as of 22 January 2018
Super Rugby
Years	Team	Apps	(Points)
2018−2020	Jaguares	14	(0)
- Correct as of 18 February 2018
International career
Years	Team	Apps	(Points)
2015	Argentina Under 20	6	(0)
2018−	Argentina XV	5	(0)
2018	Argentina	3	(0)
- Correct as of 23 June 2018

Javier Díaz (born 26 July 1995) is an Argentine rugby union player who plays for Italian Top10 team Valorugby Emilia.

On 2 January 2018, Díaz was named in the Jaguares squad for the 2018 Super Rugby season. He played with Jaguares until 2020 Super Rugby season.

From 2018 Diaz was also named in Argentina XV and Argentina squad. In 2015 he partecipied to 2015 IRB Junior World Championship with Argentina Under 20.
