= Jeffery Toomaga-Allen =

NZ & Samoa international rugby union player

- Full name: Jeffery Latu Toomaga-Allen
- Born: 19 November 1990 (age 35) Wellington, New Zealand
- Height: 1.92 m (6 ft 4 in)
- Weight: 125 kg (19 st 10 lb; 276 lb)
- School: Wellington College

Rugby union career
- Position: Tighthead Prop
Senior career
Years	Team	Apps	(Points)
2012–2018	Wellington	34	(30)
2012–2019	Hurricanes	115	(20)
2019–2022	Wasps	61	(5)
2022-2023	Ulster	14	(5)
2024–	Reds	24	(15)
- Correct as of 5 June 2025
International career
Years	Team	Apps	(Points)
2010	New Zealand U20	4	(5)
2013	New Zealand	1	(0)
2022–	Samoa	3	(5)
2025	ANZAC XV	1	(0)
- Correct as of 4 March 2023

Jeffery Latu Toomaga-Allen (born 19 November 1990) is a rugby union footballer who previously played as a tighthead prop for Samoa, and for Ulster in the United Rugby Championship. He also previously played for Wellington Lions in the ITM Cup and the Hurricanes in Super Rugby. Toomaga-Allen has also played for New Zealand's international rugby team, the All Blacks, three times during his career. Toomaga-Allen is currently signed with the Queensland Reds until the end of 2025.

== Career ==
Toomaga-Allen represented New Zealand under 20 in the 2010 IRB Junior World Championship. He made his debut for Wellington and for the Hurricanes in 2012, quickly becoming a regular starter for both teams.

Toomaga-Allen became All Black no. 1130, in the test against Japan on 2 November 2013. This came after he was called into the 2013 end-of-year tour squad as injury cover.

Toomaga-Allen was not selected for the All Blacks in 2014, with Crusaders prop Joe Moody called in as injury cover for Tony Woodcock over Toomaga-Allen for the remainder of the 2014 Rugby Championship. Toomaga-Allen retained his spot as a regular for the Hurricanes and for Wellington though. Toomaga-Allen came off the bench in the 2015 Super Rugby Final, but this was lost to the Highlanders 14–21. Toomaga-Allen did not play in the following year's Grand Final which the Hurricanes won, due to his run of injuries.

Toomaga-Allen re-established his place as a regular starter for the Hurricanes in 2017, starting against the British & Irish Lions on 27 June in a 31–31 draw. Toomaga-Allen also started in the knockout rounds of Super Rugby that year, but the Hurricanes lost the semi-final to the Lions in Johannesburg 44–29. After season-ending injuries to Joe Moody and Owen Franks, Toomaga-Allen was re-called to the All Blacks for the 2017 Rugby Championship but did not make an appearance for New Zealand that year until the 2017 end-of-year tour where he came off the bench against the 31–22 win against the Barbarians, replacing Ofa Tu'ungafasi with 13 minutes left. Toomaga-Allen made his first start for New Zealand ten days later when he took part in the 28–23 win over a French XV for 66 minutes before being replaced.

Toomaga-Allen missed the first few rounds of the 2018 Super Rugby season due to injury but returned off the bench on 24 March 2018, during a 29–12 victory over the Highlanders. Toomaga-Allen returned to his starting position the week later when the Hurricanes beat the Sharks 38–37. After a good Super Rugby season, Toomaga-Allen was retained by the All Blacks for their 2018 Steinlager series against France, but he did not play in any of the three tests.

Having played his 100th Super Rugby game for the Hurricanes on 20 July 2018, which was also departing team-mate Blade Thomson's 50th game. Toomaga-Allen's 100th game for the Hurricanes was also the quarter-final against the Chiefs, which the Hurricanes won 32–31 at home. Toomaga-Allen and the rest of the Hurricanes were dismissed from the competition the following week when they lost the semi-final to the Crusaders 12–30.

Toomaga-Allen was not initially selected for the 2018 Rugby Championship, with newcomers Karl Tu'inukuafe and Tim Perry the preferred option for the All Blacks selectors. Toomaga-Allen was then instead named as the Vice-Captain for Wellington for the 2018 Mitre 10 Cup, under new captain Matt Proctor. However, Toomaga-Allen was called in as a precautionary injury cover for Ofa Tu'ungafasi. Toomaga-Allen then suffered his own hamstring injury, causing Angus Ta'avao to be called up for the All Blacks.

Toomaga-Allen moved to England to join top English Premiership side Wasps on an undisclosed-length deal from the 2019–20 season. He joined Ulster for the 2022-23 season.

From 2022, Toomaga-Allen represents Samoa following a rule change which allows players to represent a second nation if they serve a three-year international absence and were either born in the second country or have a parent or grandparent born there. Toomaga-Allen made his debut for Samoa against Italy on 5 November 2022 in the 2022 end-of-year rugby union internationals.

In 2023, Toomaga-Allen scored his first try for Ulster Rugby against the DHL Stormers .Toomaga-Allen earned himself the United Rugby Championship Man of the Match award from the 35-5 win. Toomaga-Allen grew in popularity with the Ulster fans, later being known as “Big Jeff”. He played his last game for Ulster Rugby in their 10-15 home loss to Connacht Rugby.

In August 2023, Toomaga-Allen signed with the Queensland Reds for a two-year contract, until the end of 2025.
