= Nathan Harris (rugby union) =

NZ international rugby union player

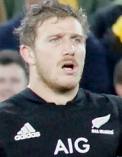
- Harris in 2017
- Full name: Nathan Paul Harris
- Born: 8 March 1992 (age 34) Tauranga, New Zealand
- Height: 1.86 m (6 ft 1 in)
- Weight: 110 kg (17 st 5 lb; 243 lb)
- School: Tauranga Boys' College

Rugby union career
- Position: Hooker
Senior career
Years	Team	Apps	(Points)
2012–2021	Bay of Plenty	39	(15)
2014–2021	Chiefs	62	(40)
International career
Years	Team	Apps	(Points)
2012	New Zealand U20	5	(5)
2014–2018	New Zealand	20	(10)

Nathan Paul Harris (born 8 March 1992) is a former New Zealand rugby union player who played as a hooker for Bay of Plenty in the ITM Cup and the Chiefs in Super Rugby.

== Career ==
Harris debuted for Bay of Plenty during the 2012 ITM Cup. He only made a solitary appearance during that campaign, but the following year he established himself as the Steamers' first-choice hooker. Despite a disappointing season for his side in 2013, Harris' individual performances were impressive. Initially, he was not named in any of New Zealand's five Super Rugby franchises squads for the 2014 Super Rugby season. But, the defending champion Chiefs, who had selected Hika Elliot, Mahonri Schwalger and Rhys Marshall as their hookers were struck with a selection crisis as Elliot and Schwalger went down with injuries prior to the start of the season. This opened the door for Harris to join the Hamilton based outfit on a short-term contract. He made his super rugby debut in week 1 of the season as the Chiefs defeated the Crusaders in Christchurch.

== International career ==
=== Early career ===
Harris was a member of the New Zealand Under 20 side which finished as runners-up in the 2012 IRB Junior World Championship in South Africa. Harris was first-choice hooker during the competition, with his back up being future Chiefs teammate Rhys Marshall, who he later backed up. During his time there, it was revealed that he was being investigated by South African police on a rape allegation. Harris maintained ignorance. He was later cleared of any wrongdoing, and South African authorities did not prosecute him.

Harris made his international debut for New Zealand in round 5 of the 2014 Rugby Championship, replacing the great Keven Mealamu with nine minutes to go. This came after Harris and prop Joe Moody were added to the squad as injury cover. Harris made his first international start in his second test for the All Blacks, scoring the opening try against the United States in the first two minutes. Harris was injured ten minutes later and replaced by Mealamu. The All Blacks went on to demolish the States 74–6.

=== 2015–2016 ===
After missing all of international rugby in 2015 due to injury, Harris was re-selected for the All Blacks in the 32-man squad to face Wales in 2016. Harris replaced Dane Coles off the bench in the first and second tests of the series, scoring the winning try of the first test long after the whistle was blown, allowing the All Blacks to win 39–21. Harris only managed 13 minutes of game-time across the series however, due to the dominance of Coles, who was later nominated for World Rugby Player of the Year in 2016. Harris was named to start in the first test of the Bledisloe Cup against Australia that year, but was replaced by Codie Taylor due to snapping his ACL prior to the test. Harris missed the rest of 2016 due to injury.

=== 2017–2019 ===
Harris was selected for the 2017 series against the British and Irish Lions, replacing Codie Taylor in the warm-up 78–0 demolition of Samoa the week before the first test. Harris performed incredibly well throwing the lineout ball, with the All Blacks winning all nine of Harris' throws. This saw Harris chosen to replace Taylor off the bench in all three tests against the Lions. Harris only played 23 minutes of game time across the series unfortunately, with Taylor being one of the standout performers of the series.

Harris stayed injury-free for the rest of 2017 and played another five times in the year. Harris started against the Barbarians on the end-of-year tour. Despite a great performance for most of the fixture, Harris silenced critics by scoring a great try. Harris was replaced by debutant Asafo Aumua with 12 minutes left. Harris started again on tour against a French XV before making way for Aumua with 14 minutes to go. Harris made two more appearances for the All Blacks on the end-of-year tour, replacing Taylor- the clear first-choice hooker, off the bench in wins against Scotland and Wales.

Harris replaced Taylor off the bench in the first two tests of the 2018 French series, but missed the third test due to the birth of his first child. Liam Coltman earned a re-call to international rugby in Harris' absence. He played a total of nine tests off the bench in 2018, but with Dane Coles returning from injury, Harris was once again relegated to the third-choice hooker, for the All Blacks, after the end of the 2018 Rugby Championship.

Breaking his leg during the 2019 Mitre 10 Cup meant that Harris was not considered for selection towards the 2019 Rugby World Cup.

== Outside of rugby ==
From 2016 to 2022, Harris pursued a Bachelor's degree at the University of Waikato in Health, Sport, and Human Performance. He majored in Sport Development and Coaching, with a minor in Geography.

In 2023, Harris was employed as a Physical Education teacher at Pāpāmoa College
