= Karl Tu'inukuafe =

NZ international rugby union player

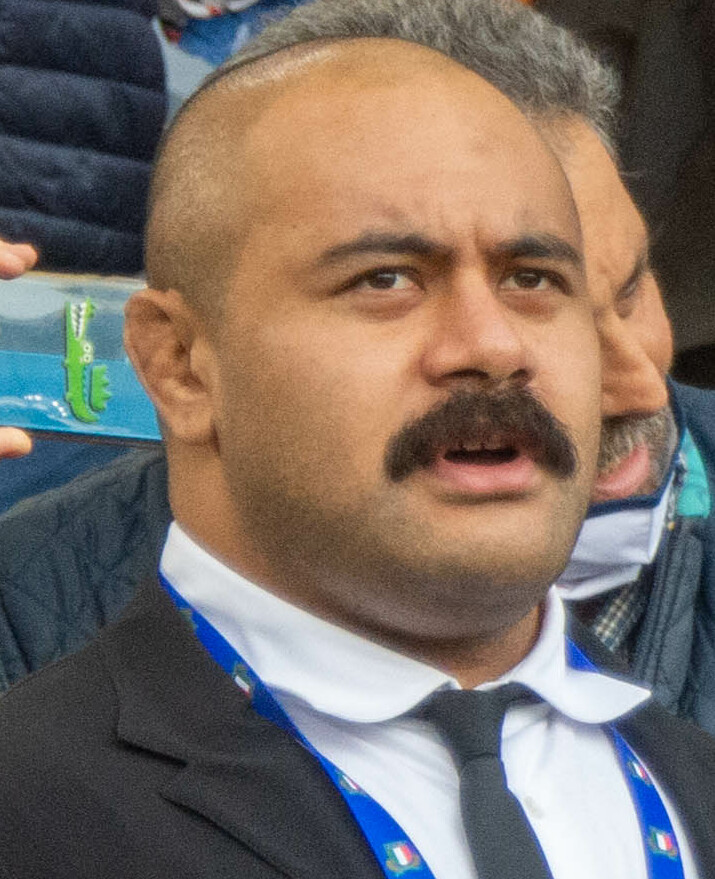
- Tu'inukuafe in 2021
- Full name: George Zvi Karl Tu'inukuafe
- Born: 21 February 1993 (age 33) Auckland, New Zealand
- Height: 182 cm (6 ft 0 in)
- Weight: 135 kg (298 lb; 21 st 4 lb)
- School: Wesley College

Rugby union career
- Position: Prop
Senior career
| Years | Team | Apps | (Points) |
| 2015–2020 | North Harbour | 30 | (15) |
| 2015–2016 | Narbonne | 23 | (0) |
| 2018 | Chiefs | 16 | (5) |
| 2019–2022 | Blues | 43 | (10) |
| 2022–2024 | Montpellier | 12 | (0) |
- Correct as of 16 April 2024
International career
| Years | Team | Apps | (Points) |
| 2018–2022 | New Zealand | 27 | (5) |
| 2020 | North Island | 1 | (0) |
- Correct as of 16 April 2024

George Zvi Karl Tu'inukuafe (born 21 February 1993) is a retired New Zealand rugby union player who played for the Blues in Super Rugby, and for North Harbour in the National Provincial Championship. He also represented the New Zealand national team on 27 occasions. His position of choice is loosehead prop.

He has previously represented the Chiefs in Super Rugby and Narbonne in the French Rugby Pro Division 2. Tu'inukuafe was also a nominee for World Rugby's Breakthrough Player of the Year award in 2018.

== Early life ==
Tu'inukuafe is an ex-pupil of Wesley College and played for their 1st XV Rugby team alongside Blues teammate Nepo Laulala, as well as former All Blacks Malakai Fekitoa and Augustine Pulu. Tu'inukuafe worked as a security guard prior to signing to play for the North Harbour Rugby Union in 2015.

== Playing career ==
=== Early career ===
Tu'inukuafe rose to prominence in the 2018 Super Rugby season when he was selected for the Chiefs as injury cover after season-ending injuries to rookies Aidan Ross and Atunaisa Moli. Tu'inukuafe became a regular starter for the Chiefs almost immediately and made 16 appearances for the club during 2018.

Tu'inukuafe was later selected for the All Blacks after Tim Perry was ruled out of the first two mid-year tests against France. Tu'inukuafe made his debut against France in their first June test match, which took place on 9 June 2018. Tu'inukuafe replaced Joe Moody off the bench, early in the second half and was one of the best performing substitute players as the All Blacks won 52–11. Tu'inukuafe replaced Moody off the bench in the next two tests of the series, including the final, which the All Blacks won by 49–14, making the series a 3–0 win for New Zealand.

After starting for the Chiefs in their Super Rugby quarter-final against the Hurricanes on 20 July 2018, the Super Rugby season ended for Tu'inukuafe, with the Chiefs losing 31–32. Following the match, it was announced that Tu'inukuafe had committed to New Zealand Rugby until 2021. Tu'inukuafe is scheduled to move to the Blues for the 2019 Super Rugby season as part of his three-year deal.

Tu'inukuafe made his first start for the All Blacks during the 2018 Rugby Championship, starring in a 46–24 victory over Argentina's Los Pumas on 8 September. Tu'inukuafe was replaced by Tim Perry in the 59th minute and was one of the best-performing All Blacks against Los Pumas. Tu'inukuafe started again the following week, against South Africa's Springboks, after Joe Moody was ruled out with injury for the rest of the competition. New Zealand had a shock loss to South Africa, losing 34–36, despite Tu'inukuafe's 59-minute dominance over South African counterpart props, Frans Malherbe and Wilco Louw. Tu'inukuafe started in the last two tests against both Argentina and South Africa, both of which were wins for the All Blacks, winning them the competition and cementing his own place as a regular starter for his country.

Although Joe Moody returned from injury for the All Blacks' 2018 end-of-year tour, he was injured once again, with a cut eye, leaving Tu'inukuafe as the first-choice loosehead prop for the rest of the tour. Tu'inukuafe started against England, who had not played the All Blacks in four years, contributing 57 minutes of play towards the All Blacks' narrow 16–15 win over England. The following week, Tu'inukuafe then started against Ireland, who the All Blacks lost to, 9–16. Tu'inukuafe was unsurprisingly out-classed by his opposite, Irish prop Tadhg Furlong, with New Zealand's whole front-row only lasting for 46 minutes in the loss to Ireland. He finished his year off, replacing Ofa Tu'ungafasi against Italy, in a 66–3 win.

=== 2019 ===
Although he established himself as a key member of the Blues' front row during the 2019 Super Rugby season, Tu'inukuafe failed to make the field for New Zealand in the 2019 Rugby Championship, with his former Chiefs teammate, Atu Moli, returning from long-term leg injuries. Having missed two months of rugby due to illness, Tu'inukuafe was dropped prior to the 2019 Rugby World Cup.

=== 2020 ===
Tu'inukuafe scored his first international try in the 8th minute of the record-breaking 43–5 win over Australia in Sydney, the third match of the 2020 Bledisloe Cup.

== World Rugby Awards ==
In 2018, Tu'inukuafe was nominated for the World Rugby Breakthrough Player of the Year award. Tu'inukuafe joined Super Rugby franchise the Chiefs after a major injury crisis in his favoured loosehead prop position. After an impressive turnout for the franchise, he received a "sweet wake up call" when he was called up into the national team due to the injury of Tim Perry. Although Tu'inukuafe did not win the award, losing to South African winger Aphiwe Dyantyi, he has won major respect from other rugby players and fans alike.

== Honours ==
All Blacks

- Dave Gallaher Trophy - 2018
- The Rugby Championship - 2018

Individual

- World Rugby Breakthrough Player of the Year - 2018 (nominated)

== Personal life ==
Tu'inukuafe returned to playing rugby due to a significant weight gain when he was working as a Security Guard. Tu'inukuafe weighed in at 170 kg before returning to rugby and lost 35 kg, between then and making his international debut for New Zealand, becoming the second-to-heaviest All Black in history, second only to former All Black Neemia Tialata.

Tu'inukuafe has modelled for Johnny Bigg, a plus-sized menswear company, in 2018. Many of Tu'inukuafe's All Blacks team-mates, such as Rieko Ioane and Joe Moody have also done so.
