= Nepo Laulala =

New Zealand rugby union player (born 1991)

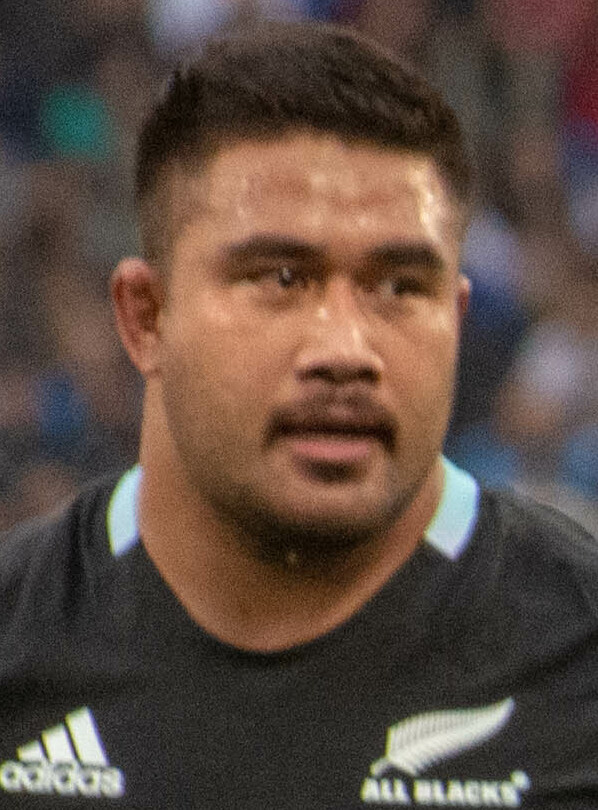
- Laulala representing New Zealand during the November Internationals
- Full name: Nepo Eti Laulala
- Born: 6 November 1991 (age 35) Moto'otua, Samoa
- Height: 1.84 m (6 ft 0 in)
- Weight: 133 kg (293 lb; 20 st 13 lb)
- School: Wesley College
- Notable relative(s): Casey Laulala (brother); Luteru Laulala (brother)

Rugby union career
- Position: Prop
- Current team: Gloucester
Senior career
Years	Team	Apps	(Points)
2011–2015	Canterbury	45	(5)
2012–2015	Crusaders	34	(5)
2016–2020	Chiefs	41	(5)
2018–2022	Counties Manukau	6	(0)
2021–2023	Blues	38	(10)
2023–2025	Toulouse	9	(0)
2025–	Gloucester	8	(0)
- Correct as of 29 May 2026
International career
Years	Team	Apps	(Points)
2015–2023	New Zealand	53	(0)
- Correct as of 29 October 2023
Medal record
Men's Rugby union
Representing New Zealand
Rugby World Cup
Silver medal – second place	2023 France	Squad
Bronze medal – third place	2019 Japan	Squad

Nepo Eti Laulala (born 6 November 1991) is a professional rugby union player who plays as a prop for Gloucester in the Premiership Rugby. Born in Samoa, he represented New Zealand at the international level from 2015 to 2023, after qualifying on residency grounds.

== Early life ==
Laulala was born in Samoa and educated at Auckland's Mount Albert Grammar School and later at Wesley College. After showing impressive form for the Wesley College 1st XV, was enticed to Christchurch to join the Canterbury Academy. Laulala played 1st XV rugby with several future professional sportsmen, including former All Blacks, Malakai Fekitoa, Charles Piutau and Augustine Pulu, as well as his current All Black teammate, Karl Tu'inukuafe.

Laulala's brothers, Casey Laulala and Luteru Laulala have also had careers in professional rugby. Casey is also a former All Black that last played international rugby in 2006. The Laulala brothers are one of 57 sets of brothers to become All Blacks.

== Club career ==
Laulala made his ITM cup debut in 2011 in a Ranfurly Shield defence against North Otago. His performances for his province have seen him named in the Crusaders squad for the 2013 Super Rugby season.

Laulala made his Super Rugby debut for the Crusaders in 2013 against the Chiefs. Laulala announced in 2015 that the Chiefs would become his new team in 2016. Laulala returned to Super Rugby in 2017 and started in most games for the Chiefs that year, including a 64-minute performance in the game against the touring British and Irish Lions on 20 June 2017, which the Chiefs lost 34–6.

Laulala fractured his forearm in a 27–21 win against the Blues in round three of the 2018 Super Rugby season. Laulala was expected to be out of professional rugby for 8–12 weeks, but has still not recovered from injury. In the dying stages of the 2018 Mitre 10 Cup, he finally made a return from his broken arm, for Counties Manukau. Although Counties Manukau failed to make the playoffs, Laulala did enough to convince All Black Head Coach, Steve Hansen, to re-select him.

With All Black teammate, Angus Ta'avao, also present in the Chiefs' squad for the 2019 Super Rugby season, Laulala started many matches across the season, although he was benched for their quarter-final, which was a 16–21 loss to the Buenos Aires-based Jaguares. On 22 October 2020, it was confirmed that Laulala would leave the Chiefs to join Auckland-based Blues prior to the 2021 Super Rugby season.

On 12 July 2023, it was confirmed that Laulala would leave New Zealand after the World Cup to join top French side Toulouse in the Top 14 on a multi-year deal from the 2023–24 season.

On 17 June 2025, Laulala moved to England to sign for Gloucester in the Premiership Rugby from the 2025–26 season after being released from the French club recently due to rupturing his Achilles tendon. Since then, Laulala has spent several months rehabbing the injury at Kingsholm.

== International career ==
=== Early career ===
Laulala was selected as part of the 41-man wider training squad for the 2015 All Blacks squad. Laulala made his debut for New Zealand in the first test match of the year against Manu Samoa in Apia on 8 July, replacing Owen Franks off the bench in the 57th minute, with the All Blacks going on to win against Manu Samoa by 25–16. He played another 3 tests off the bench for the All Blacks in 2015 but narrowly missed out on selection for the 2015 Rugby World Cup.

Laulala had a serious knee injury at the start of the 2016 season, so did not play for the Chiefs, or the All Blacks for the whole of 2016, with All Black teammates Nehe Milner-Skudder, Charlie Ngatai and James Broadhurst, missing the 2016 All Black season too.

=== 2017–2019 ===
Due to a run of injuries, Laulala was not selected for the All Blacks again until the 2017 Rugby Championship. He was a last-minute selection for the second Bledisloe Cup test against Australia (a 35–29 win to New Zealand), after 95-test veteran Owen Franks tore his Achilles tendon the day before the match. Laulala's 61-minute performance was widely acclaimed after winning several opposing scrums for the All Blacks. Laulala became a regular starter for New Zealand in Franks' absence, and started in every remaining test of the year following Franks' injury, making a total of nine test appearances for the All Blacks in 2017.

Laulala failed to make the field for the All Blacks during the 2018 mid-year tests and was not selected due to injury, much like his injured Chiefs teammate Kane Hames. Continued delays in Laulala's recovery also saw him miss the 2018 Rugby Championship, with another one of his Chiefs teammates, Angus Ta'avao, making his debut for the All Blacks while Laulala was out injured.

Laulala was named in the extended 51-man squad for the 2018 end-of-year tour and was subsequently given a spot on the bench for the third Bledisloe Cup test against Australia's Wallabies for 2018, displacing Ofa Tu'ungafasi from the match-day 23. Laulala replaced Owen Franks in the 52nd minute against the Wallabies, completing his comeback to international rugby. The All Blacks beat the Wallabies, 37–20.

A strong performance against Australia saw Laulala replace Franks in two crucial tests during the tour, against England and Ireland, the latter of whom defeated New Zealand for only the second time in history, with the All Blacks losing 9–16. Laulala was out-performed by his opposites, Cian Healy and Jack McGrath, but still performed fine. After a long injury-plagued year, Laulala earned a start for the final test of the tour, which was only his fourth test of 2018. The final test on tour took place at Stadio Olimpico Rome in Italy. The All Blacks finished the year off with a 66–3 win over Italy. Laulala contributed a 54-minute performance towards the win against Italy and was replaced by Angus Ta'avao after a good game.

After a poor performance from Owen Franks in New Zealand's record 26–47 defeat at the hands of Australia in Perth, Laulala reclaimed a place in the starting lineup for New Zealand's second Bledisloe Cup test against Australia for 2019, which ended as a 36–0 victory.

On 28 August, All Blacks Head Coach, Steve Hansen named Laulala as one of 31 players in New Zealand's squad for the 2019 Rugby World Cup. With Owen Franks missing out on the squad entirely, the selection of Laulala and Angus Ta'avao received widespread news coverage. Franks claimed that Laulala and Ta'avao "deserve their places in the World Cup squad".

Laulala played in all of New Zealand's tests at the 2019 Rugby World Cup, starting in five and as a substitute against Canada. The All Blacks finished third place in the competition, beating Wales in the Bronze Final after a 7–19 loss to England during the semi-finals.

=== 2020–2023 ===
After overcoming another bout of injuries during the 2022 Rugby Championship, Laulala was selected for his second World Cup. Laulala played his 50th test match for the All Blacks, starting in the 3 jersey against France during their 13–27 loss in the opening match of the 2023 Rugby World Cup. His contributions in the tournament were three starts and as a replacement during the World Cup final, which was a 12–13 loss to South Africa. Laulala finished his international career with 53 tests to his name.

== Honours ==
New Zealand

- Rugby World Cup / Webb Ellis Cup
  - Third-place: 2019

Toulouse

- European Rugby Champions Cup: 2024
