= 2018 Rugby Championship =

- Date: 18 August – 6 October 2018
- Countries: Argentina; Australia; New Zealand; South Africa

Final positions
- Champions: New Zealand (16th title)
- Bledisloe Cup: New Zealand
- Freedom Cup: New Zealand
- Mandela Challenge Plate: Australia
- Puma Trophy: Australia

Tournament statistics
- Matches played: 12
- Tries scored: 88 (7.33 per match)
- Attendance: 433,657 (36,138 per match)
- Top scorer(s): Nicolás Sánchez (67)
- Most tries: Beauden Barrett (5); Aphiwe Dyantyi (5); Rieko Ioane (5)

The 2018 Rugby Championship was the seventh edition of the expanded annual southern hemisphere Rugby Championship, featuring Argentina, Australia, South Africa and New Zealand. The competition is operated by SANZAAR, a joint venture of the four countries' national unions.

The tournament continued to use the same sequence of games across the schedule, starting on 18 August with Australia hosting reigning champions New Zealand and South Africa hosting Argentina, and ending after eight weeks (six rounds and two bye weeks) on 6 October when New Zealand visited South Africa and Australia played in Argentina.

New Zealand won the Championship for the sixth time after a 35-17 win over Argentina in Buenos Aires on 29 September.

== Background ==
The tournament is operated by SANZAAR and known for sponsorship reasons as The Castle Rugby Championship in South Africa, The Investec Rugby Championship in New Zealand, The Mitsubishi Estate Rugby Championship in Australia, and The Personal Rugby Championship in Argentina.

=== Format ===
The format for the 2018 tournament retained the previous Championship format that changed in 2017. Each side played the other once at home, and once away, giving a total of six matches each, and twelve in total. A win earned a team four league points, a draw two league points, and a loss by eight or more points zero league points. A bonus point was earned in one of two ways: by scoring at least three tries more than the opponent in a match, or by losing within seven points. The competition winner was the side with the most points at the end of the tournament.

== Table ==
| Pos | Team | Pld | W | D | L | PF | PA | PD | TF | TA | TB | LB | Pts |
|---|---|---|---|---|---|---|---|---|---|---|---|---|---|
| 1 | New Zealand (C) | 6 | 5 | 0 | 1 | 225 | 132 | +93 | 33 | 16 | 4 | 1 | 25 |
| 2 | South Africa | 6 | 3 | 0 | 3 | 160 | 154 | +6 | 21 | 21 | 1 | 2 | 15 |
| 3 | Australia | 6 | 2 | 0 | 4 | 124 | 176 | −52 | 16 | 22 | 0 | 1 | 9 |
| 4 | Argentina | 6 | 2 | 0 | 4 | 151 | 198 | −47 | 18 | 29 | 0 | 0 | 8 |

Source: SANZAAR
(C) Champion

== Results ==
=== Round 1 ===
18 August 2018
19:45 AEST (UTC+10)

| Australia | 13–38 | New Zealand (1 BP) |
| Try: Maddocks 66' c Con: Foley (1/1) 66'; Pen: Hodge (1/1) 9'; Foley (1/1) 20' | Report | Try: A. Smith 38' m Goodhue 42' c B. Barrett 51' c Retallick 62' c Naholo (2) 73' m, 74' c Con: B. Barrett (4/6) 43', 52', 64', 76' |

Stadium Australia, Sydney
Attendance: 66,318
Referee: Jaco Peyper (South Africa)

| FB | 15 | Israel Folau | (substituted off) 63' |
| RW | 14 | Dane Haylett-Petty | (substituted off) 53' |
| OC | 13 | Reece Hodge |
| IC | 12 | Kurtley Beale |
| LW | 11 | Marika Koroibete |
| FH | 10 | Bernard Foley |
| SH | 9 | Will Genia | (substituted off) 73' |
| N8 | 8 | David Pocock |
| OF | 7 | Michael Hooper (c) | (substituted off) 73' |
| BF | 6 | Lukhan Tui |
| RL | 5 | Adam Coleman |
| LL | 4 | Izack Rodda | (substituted off) 64' |
| TP | 3 | Sekope Kepu | 34' to 40' | | (substituted off) 58' |
| HK | 2 | Tatafu Polota-Nau | (substituted off) 45' |
| LP | 1 | Tom Robertson | | | (substituted off) 73' |
Replacements:
| HK | 16 | Tolu Latu | (substituted on) 45' |
| PR | 17 | Allan Alaalatoa | | | (substituted on) 58' |
| PR | 18 | Jermaine Ainsley | (substituted on) 34' | (substituted off) 40' | (substituted on) 73' |
| LK | 19 | Rob Simmons | (substituted on) 64' |
| FL | 20 | Pete Samu | (substituted on) 73' |
| SH | 21 | Nick Phipps | (substituted on) 73' |
| FH | 22 | Matt To'omua | (substituted on) 63' |
| WG | 23 | Jack Maddocks | (substituted on) 53' |
Coach:
(Australia) Michael Cheika

| FB | 15 | Ben Smith |
| RW | 14 | Waisake Naholo |
| OC | 13 | Jack Goodhue |
| IC | 12 | Ryan Crotty | (substituted off) 12' |
| LW | 11 | Rieko Ioane | (substituted off) 46' |
| FH | 10 | Beauden Barrett |
| SH | 9 | Aaron Smith | (substituted off) 67' |
| N8 | 8 | Kieran Read (c) |
| OF | 7 | Sam Cane | (substituted off) 69' |
| BF | 6 | Liam Squire | (substituted off) 58' |
| RL | 5 | Sam Whitelock |
| LL | 4 | Brodie Retallick |
| TP | 3 | Owen Franks | (substituted off) 58' |
| HK | 2 | Codie Taylor | (substituted off) 67' |
| LP | 1 | Joe Moody | (substituted off) 53' |
Replacements:
| HK | 16 | Nathan Harris | (substituted on) 67' |
| PR | 17 | Tim Perry | (substituted on) 53' |
| PR | 18 | Karl Tu’inukuafe | (substituted on) 58' |
| LK | 19 | Scott Barrett | (substituted on) 58' |
| FL | 20 | Ardie Savea | (substituted on) 69' |
| SH | 21 | TJ Perenara | (substituted on) 67' |
| FH | 22 | Damian McKenzie | (substituted on) 46' |
| CE | 23 | Anton Lienert-Brown | (substituted on) 12' |
Coach:
(New Zealand) Steve Hansen

Man of the Match:
Brodie Retallick (New Zealand)

Touch judges:
Wayne Barnes (England)
Luke Pearce (England)
Television match official:
Marius Jonker (South Africa)

Notes:

- Jermaine Ainsley and Jack Maddocks (both Australia) and Tim Perry (New Zealand) made their international debuts.
- Sam Whitelock (New Zealand) became the eighth and youngest ever All Black to earn his 100th test cap.

18 August 2018
17:05 SAST (UTC+02)

| (1 BP) South Africa | 34–21 | Argentina |
| Try: Am 7' m Dyantyi (2) 31' m, 41' c Mapimpi (2) 48' m, 52' m De Klerk 69' c Con: Pollard (2/6) 43', 70' | Report | Try: Sanchez 14' c Matera 26' c Moroni 66' c Con: Sanchez (3/3) 15', 28', 66' |

Kings Park Stadium, Durban
Attendance: 26,800
Referee: Ben O'Keeffe (New Zealand)

| FB | 15 | Willie le Roux |
| RW | 14 | Makazole Mapimpi |
| OC | 13 | Lukhanyo Am | (substituted off) 72' |
| IC | 12 | André Esterhuizen | (substituted off) 62' |
| LW | 11 | Aphiwe Dyantyi | (substituted off) 73' |
| FH | 10 | Handré Pollard |
| SH | 9 | Faf de Klerk |
| N8 | 8 | Warren Whiteley |
| OF | 7 | Siya Kolisi (c) |
| BF | 6 | Francois Louw | (substituted off) 59' |
| RL | 5 | Pieter-Steph du Toit |
| LL | 4 | Eben Etzebeth |
| TP | 3 | Frans Malherbe | (substituted off) 57' |
| HK | 2 | Malcolm Marx | (substituted off) 64' |
| LP | 1 | Tendai Mtawarira | (substituted off) 51' |
Replacements:
| HK | 16 | Bongi Mbonambi | (substituted on) 64' |
| PR | 17 | Steven Kitshoff | (substituted on) 51' |
| PR | 18 | Thomas du Toit | (substituted on) 57' |
| LK | 19 | Marvin Orie |
| FL | 20 | Marco van Staden | (substituted on) 59' |
| SH | 21 | Embrose Papier | (substituted on) 73' |
| CE | 22 | Lionel Mapoe | (substituted on) 72' |
| FH | 23 | Damian Willemse | (substituted on) 62' |
Coach:
(South Africa) Rassie Erasmus

| FB | 15 | Emiliano Boffelli |
| RW | 14 | Bautista Delguy |
| OC | 13 | Matías Moroni |
| IC | 12 | Bautista Ezcurra | (substituted off) 79' |
| LW | 11 | Ramiro Moyano |
| FH | 10 | Nicolás Sánchez |
| SH | 9 | Gonzalo Bertranou | (substituted off) 62' |
| N8 | 8 | Javier Ortega Desio |
| OF | 7 | Marcos Kremer |
| BF | 6 | Pablo Matera | (substituted off) 50' |
| RL | 5 | Matías Alemanno | (substituted off) 53' |
| LL | 4 | Guido Petti |
| TP | 3 | Juan Figallo | (substituted off) 62' |
| HK | 2 | Agustín Creevy (c) | (substituted off) 71' |
| LP | 1 | Nahuel Tetaz Chaparro | (substituted off) 50' |
Replacements:
| HK | 16 | Diego Fortuny | (substituted on) 71' |
| PR | 17 | Santiago García Botta | (substituted on) 50' |
| PR | 18 | Santiago Medrano | (substituted on) 62' |
| LK | 19 | Tomás Lavanini | (substituted on) 53' |
| FL | 20 | Tomás Lezana | (substituted on) 50' |
| SH | 21 | Martín Landajo | (substituted on) 62' |
| CE | 22 | Santiago González Iglesias | (substituted on) 79' |
| FB | 23 | Juan Cruz Mallia |
Coach:
(Argentina) Mario Ledesma

Man of the Match:
Aphiwe Dyantyi (South Africa)

Touch judges:
Angus Gardner (Australia)
Andrew Brace (Ireland)
Television match official:
Simon McDowell (Ireland)

Notes:

- Marco van Staden and Damian Willemse (both South Africa) and Diego Fortuny (Argentina) made their international debuts.
- Pablo Matera (Argentina) earned his 50th test cap.

=== Round 2 ===
25 August 2018
19:35 NZST (UTC+12)

| (1 BP) New Zealand | 40–12 | Australia |
| Try: B. Barrett (4) 12' c, 37' c, 61' c, 68' m Moody 42' c Squire 47' c Con: B. Barrett (5/6) 13', 38' 43', 48', 62' | Report | Try: Genia 28' c Hodge 54' m Con: Foley (1/2) 29' |

Eden Park, Auckland
Attendance: 49,983
Referee: Wayne Barnes (England)

| FB | 15 | Jordie Barrett | (substituted off) 66' |
| RW | 14 | Ben Smith |
| OC | 13 | Jack Goodhue | (substituted off) 62' |
| IC | 12 | Ngani Laumape |
| LW | 11 | Waisake Naholo |
| FH | 10 | Beauden Barrett |
| SH | 9 | Aaron Smith | (substituted off) 62' |
| N8 | 8 | Kieran Read (c) |
| OF | 7 | Sam Cane | (substituted off) 52' |
| BF | 6 | Liam Squire | (substituted off) 55' |
| RL | 5 | Sam Whitelock |
| LL | 4 | Brodie Retallick |
| TP | 3 | Owen Franks | (substituted off) 51' |
| HK | 2 | Codie Taylor | (substituted off) 55' |
| LP | 1 | Joe Moody | (substituted off) 55' |
Replacements:
| HK | 16 | Nathan Harris | (substituted on) 55' |
| PR | 17 | Karl Tu’inukuafe | (substituted on) 55' |
| PR | 18 | Ofa Tu'ungafasi | (substituted on) 51' |
| LK | 19 | Scott Barrett | (substituted on) 55' |
| FL | 20 | Ardie Savea | (substituted on) 52' |
| SH | 21 | TJ Perenara | (substituted on) 62' |
| FH | 22 | Damian McKenzie | (substituted on) 66' |
| CE | 23 | Anton Lienert-Brown | (substituted on) 62' |
Coach:
(New Zealand) Steve Hansen

| FB | 15 | Dane Haylett-Petty | (substituted off) 64' |
| RW | 14 | Jack Maddocks |
| OC | 13 | Reece Hodge |
| IC | 12 | Kurtley Beale |
| LW | 11 | Marika Koroibete |
| FH | 10 | Bernard Foley | (substituted off) 70' |
| SH | 9 | Will Genia | (substituted off) 70' |
| N8 | 8 | David Pocock |
| OF | 7 | Michael Hooper (c) | (substituted off) 70' |
| BF | 6 | Lukhan Tui |
| RL | 5 | Adam Coleman |
| LL | 4 | Izack Rodda | (substituted off) 51' |
| TP | 3 | Allan Alaalatoa | (substituted off) 51' |
| HK | 2 | Tatafu Polota-Nau | (substituted off) 52' |
| LP | 1 | Scott Sio | (substituted off) 51' |
Replacements:
| HK | 16 | Folau Fainga'a | (substituted on) 52' |
| PR | 17 | Tom Robertson | (substituted on) 51' |
| PR | 18 | Sekope Kepu | (substituted on) 51' |
| LK | 19 | Rob Simmons | (substituted on) 51' |
| FL | 20 | Pete Samu | (substituted on) 70' |
| SH | 21 | Nick Phipps | (substituted on) 70' |
| FH | 22 | Matt To'omua | (substituted on) 64' |
| FB | 23 | Tom Banks | (substituted on) 70' |
Coach:
(Australia) Michael Cheika

Man of the Match:
Beauden Barrett (New Zealand)

Touch judges:
Jaco Peyper (South Africa)
Luke Pearce (England)
Television match official:
Marius Jonker (South Africa)

Notes:

- Folau Fainga'a and Tom Banks (both Australia) made their international debuts.
- Owen Franks (New Zealand) became the ninth ever All Black to earn his 100th test cap.
- New Zealand retain the Bledisloe Cup.

25 August 2018
16:10 AST (UTC-03)

| Argentina | 32–19 | South Africa |
| Try: Delguy (2) 18' c, 22' c Sánchez 26' c Moyano 45' m Con: Sánchez (3/4) 19', 23', 27'; Pen: Sánchez (1/1) 4'; Drop: Sánchez (1/1) 36' | Report | Try: Kolisi 13' c Mapoe (2) 47' c, 64' m Con: Pollard (2/3) 14', 48' |

Estadio Malvinas Argentinas, Mendoza
Attendance: 27,460
Referee: Angus Gardner (Australia)

| FB | 15 | Emiliano Boffelli |
| RW | 14 | Bautista Delguy |
| OC | 13 | Matías Moroni |
| IC | 12 | Bautista Ezcurra | (substituted off) 79' |
| LW | 11 | Ramiro Moyano | (substituted off) 57' |
| FH | 10 | Nicolás Sánchez |
| SH | 9 | Gonzalo Bertranou | (substituted off) 68' |
| N8 | 8 | Javier Ortega Desio |
| OF | 7 | Marcos Kremer |
| BF | 6 | Pablo Matera | (substituted off) 59' |
| RL | 5 | Tomás Lavanini | (substituted off) 71' |
| LL | 4 | Guido Petti |
| TP | 3 | Juan Figallo | (substituted off) 68' |
| HK | 2 | Agustín Creevy (c) | (substituted off) 76' |
| LP | 1 | Nahuel Tetaz Chaparro | (substituted off) 63' |
Replacements:
| HK | 16 | Facundo Bosch | (substituted on) 76' |
| PR | 17 | Santiago García Botta | (substituted on) 63' |
| PR | 18 | Santiago Medrano | (substituted on) 68' |
| LK | 19 | Matías Alemanno | (substituted on) 71' |
| FL | 20 | Tomás Lezana | (substituted on) 59' |
| SH | 21 | Tomás Cubelli | (substituted on) 68' |
| CE | 22 | Jerónimo de la Fuente | (substituted on) 57' |
| FB | 23 | Juan Cruz Mallia | (substituted on) 79' |
Coach:
(Argentina) Mario Ledesma

| FB | 15 | Willie le Roux |
| RW | 14 | Makazole Mapimpi | | (substituted off) 11' |
| OC | 13 | Lukhanyo Am |
| IC | 12 | André Esterhuizen | | (substituted off) 62' |
| LW | 11 | Aphiwe Dyantyi |
| FH | 10 | Handré Pollard |
| SH | 9 | Faf de Klerk |
| N8 | 8 | Warren Whiteley | | (substituted off) 52' | (substituted on) 62' |
| OF | 7 | Siya Kolisi (c) |
| BF | 6 | Francois Louw |
| RL | 5 | Franco Mostert | | | (substituted off) 62' |
| LL | 4 | Eben Etzebeth | (yellow card) 24' to 34' | (substituted off) 46' |
| TP | 3 | Frans Malherbe | | (substituted off) 62' |
| HK | 2 | Malcolm Marx | | (substituted off) 71' |
| LP | 1 | Tendai Mtawarira | | (substituted off) 42' |
Replacements:
| HK | 16 | Bongi Mbonambi | | (substituted on) 71' |
| PR | 17 | Steven Kitshoff | | (substituted on) 42' |
| PR | 18 | Wilco Louw | | (substituted on) 62' |
| LK | 19 | RG Snyman | | (substituted on) 52' |
| LK | 20 | Pieter-Steph du Toit | | (substituted on) 46' |
| SH | 21 | Embrose Papier |
| CE | 22 | Lionel Mapoe | | (substituted on) 11' |
| FH | 23 | Damian Willemse | | (substituted on) 62' |
Coach:
(South Africa) Rassie Erasmus

Man of the Match:
Guido Petti (Argentina)

Touch judges:
Ben O'Keeffe (New Zealand)
Andrew Brace (Ireland)
Television match official:
Simon McDowell (Ireland)

Notes:

- Facundo Bosch (Argentina) made his international debut.
- This is Argentina's largest winning margin over South Africa, surpassing the 12-point difference set in 2015.

=== Round 3 ===
8 September 2018
19:35 NZST (UTC+12)

| (1 BP) New Zealand | 46–24 | Argentina |
| Try: Milner-Skudder 17' c Perenara (2) 29' m, 57' c Read 48' c Frizell 73' c Goodhue 79' c Con: Mo'unga (5/6) 19', 50', 58', 73', 80'; Pen: Mo'unga (2/2) 4', 40' | Report | Try: Moyano 14' c Sánchez 41' c Boffelli 69' c Con: Sánchez (3/3) 15', 42', 70'; Pen: Sánchez (1/1) 55' |

Trafalgar Park, Nelson
Attendance: 21,440
Referee: Pascal Gaüzère (France)

| FB | 15 | Ben Smith | (substituted off) 9' | (substituted on) 19' |
| RW | 14 | Nehe Milner-Skudder |
| OC | 13 | Jack Goodhue |
| IC | 12 | Ngani Laumape | (substituted off) 9' |
| LW | 11 | Waisake Naholo | (substituted off) 58' |
| FH | 10 | Richie Mo'unga |
| SH | 9 | TJ Perenara | (substituted off) 71' |
| N8 | 8 | Kieran Read (c) | (substituted off) 58' |
| OF | 7 | Ardie Savea |
| BF | 6 | Shannon Frizell |
| RL | 5 | Scott Barrett |
| LL | 4 | Brodie Retallick | (substituted off) 9' |
| TP | 3 | Owen Franks | (substituted off) 46' |
| HK | 2 | Codie Taylor | (substituted off) 62' |
| LP | 1 | Karl Tu’inukuafe | (substituted off) 58' |
Replacements:
| HK | 16 | Nathan Harris | (substituted on) 62' |
| PR | 17 | Tim Perry | (substituted on) 58' |
| PR | 18 | Ofa Tu'ungafasi | (substituted on) 46' |
| LK | 19 | Sam Whitelock | (substituted on) 9' |
| N8 | 20 | Luke Whitelock | (substituted on) 58' |
| SH | 21 | Te Toiroa Tahuriorangi | (substituted on) 71' |
| FH | 22 | Damian McKenzie | (substituted on) 9' |
| CE | 23 | Anton Lienert-Brown | (substituted on) 9' | (substituted off) 19' | (substituted on) 58' |
Coach:
(New Zealand) Steve Hansen

| FB | 15 | Emiliano Boffelli |
| RW | 14 | Bautista Delguy |
| OC | 13 | Matías Moroni | (substituted off) 64' |
| IC | 12 | Jerónimo de la Fuente |
| LW | 11 | Ramiro Moyano |
| FH | 10 | Nicolás Sánchez |
| SH | 9 | Martín Landajo | (substituted off) 62' |
| N8 | 8 | Javier Ortega Desio |
| OF | 7 | Marcos Kremer |
| BF | 6 | Tomás Lezana | (substituted off) 62' |
| RL | 5 | Tomás Lavanini |
| LL | 4 | Guido Petti | (substituted off) 58' |
| TP | 3 | Nahuel Tetaz Chaparro | (substituted off) 50' |
| HK | 2 | Agustín Creevy (c) | (substituted off) 50' |
| LP | 1 | Santiago García Botta | (substituted off) 58' |
Replacements:
| HK | 16 | Julián Montoya | (substituted on) 50' |
| PR | 17 | Juan Pablo Zeiss | (substituted on) 58' |
| PR | 18 | Gaston Cortes | (substituted on) 50' |
| LK | 19 | Matías Alemanno | (substituted on) 58' |
| FL | 20 | Pablo Matera | (substituted on) 62' |
| SH | 21 | Tomás Cubelli | (substituted on) 62' |
| CE | 22 | Bautista Ezcurra |
| FB | 23 | Juan Cruz Mallia | (substituted on) 64' |
Coach:
(Argentina) Mario Ledesma

Man of the Match:
TJ Perenara (New Zealand)

Touch judges:
Nigel Owens (Wales)
Nic Berry (Australia)
Television match official:
Rowan Kitt (England)

Notes:

- Te Toiroa Tahuriorangi (New Zealand) and Juan Pablo Zeiss (Argentina) made their international debuts.

8 September 2018
20:05 AEST (UTC+10)

| Australia | 23–18 | South Africa (1 BP) |
| Try: Hooper 1' c To'omua 32' c Con: To'omua (2/2) 2', 33'; Pen: Hodge (1/1) 40'; To'omua (2/2) 54', 68' | Report | Try: Mbonambi 13' c Mapimpi 27' m Con: Jantjies (1/2) 15'; Pen: Jantjies (2/2) 6', 38' |

Lang Park, Brisbane
Attendance: 27,849
Referee: Glen Jackson (New Zealand)

| FB | 15 | Dane Haylett-Petty |
| RW | 14 | Jack Maddocks | (substituted off) 61' |
| OC | 13 | Reece Hodge | (substituted off) 68' | (substituted on) 75' |
| IC | 12 | Matt To'omua |
| LW | 11 | Marika Koroibete | | (substituted off) 75' |
| FH | 10 | Kurtley Beale |
| SH | 9 | Will Genia |
| N8 | 8 | Pete Samu |
| OF | 7 | Michael Hooper (c) |
| BF | 6 | Lukhan Tui |
| RL | 5 | Izack Rodda | (substituted off) 41' | (substituted on) 58' | (substituted off) 67' |
| LL | 4 | Rory Arnold | | (substituted off) 58' | (substituted on) 67' | (substituted off) 76' |
| TP | 3 | Allan Alaalatoa | (substituted off) 47' |
| HK | 2 | Tatafu Polota-Nau | (substituted off) 33' | (substituted on) 71' |
| LP | 1 | Scott Sio | (substituted off) 69' |
Replacements:
| HK | 16 | Folau Fainga'a | (substituted on) 33' | (substituted off) 71' |
| PR | 17 | Tom Robertson | (substituted on) 69' |
| PR | 18 | Taniela Tupou | (substituted on) 47' |
| LK | 19 | Rob Simmons | (substituted on) 41' |
| FL | 20 | Ned Hanigan | | | | (substituted on) 76' |
| SH | 21 | Joe Powell |
| FH | 22 | Bernard Foley | (substituted on) 61' |
| FB | 23 | Tom Banks | (substituted on) 68' |
Coach:
(Australia) Michael Cheika

| FB | 15 | Willie le Roux |
| RW | 14 | Makazole Mapimpi | (substituted off) 33' |
| OC | 13 | Jesse Kriel |
| IC | 12 | Damian de Allende |
| LW | 11 | Aphiwe Dyantyi |
| FH | 10 | Elton Jantjies | (substituted off) 64' |
| SH | 9 | Faf de Klerk |
| N8 | 8 | Warren Whiteley | (substituted off) 61' |
| OF | 7 | Pieter-Steph du Toit |
| BF | 6 | Siya Kolisi (c) |
| RL | 5 | Franco Mostert |
| LL | 4 | Eben Etzebeth | (substituted off) 60' |
| TP | 3 | Frans Malherbe | (substituted off) 57' |
| HK | 2 | Bongi Mbonambi | (substituted off) 34' |
| LP | 1 | Steven Kitshoff | (substituted off) 57' |
Replacements:
| HK | 16 | Malcolm Marx | (substituted on) 34' |
| PR | 17 | Tendai Mtawarira | (substituted on) 57' |
| PR | 18 | Wilco Louw | (substituted on) 57' |
| LK | 19 | RG Snyman | (substituted on) 60' |
| LK | 20 | Francois Louw | (substituted on) 61' |
| SH | 21 | Embrose Papier |
| CE | 22 | Handré Pollard | (substituted on) 64' |
| FB | 23 | Cheslin Kolbe | (substituted on) 33' |
Coach:
(South Africa) Rassie Erasmus

Man of the Match:
Matt To'omua (Australia)

Touch judges:
John Lacey (Ireland)
Paul Williams (New Zealand)
Television match official:
Glenn Newman (New Zealand)

Notes:

- Cheslin Kolbe (South Africa) made his international debut.
- Australia retain the Mandela Challenge Plate.

=== Round 4 ===
15 September 2018
19:35 NZST (UTC+12)

| (1 BP) New Zealand | 34–36 | South Africa |
| Try: J. Barrett 4' m A. Smith 15' c Ioane (2) 37' m, 51' c Taylor 60' m Savea 73' m Con: B. Barrett (2/6) 17', 53' | Report | Try: Dyantyi (2) 19' c, 56' m Le Roux 24' c Marx 31' c Kolbe 41' c Con: Pollard (4/5) 20', 25', 32', 42'; Pen: Pollard (1/1) 40 |

Wellington Regional Stadium, Wellington
Attendance: 34,182
Referee: Nigel Owens (Wales)

| FB | 15 | Jordie Barrett | (substituted off) 58' |
| RW | 14 | Ben Smith |
| OC | 13 | Anton Lienert-Brown | (substituted off) 58' |
| IC | 12 | Ryan Crotty |
| LW | 11 | Rieko Ioane |
| FH | 10 | Beauden Barrett |
| SH | 9 | Aaron Smith | (substituted off) 49' |
| N8 | 8 | Kieran Read (c) |
| OF | 7 | Sam Cane | (substituted off) 68' |
| BF | 6 | Liam Squire | (substituted off) 58' |
| RL | 5 | Scott Barrett |
| LL | 4 | Sam Whitelock |
| TP | 3 | Owen Franks | (substituted off) 47' |
| HK | 2 | Codie Taylor | (substituted off) 75' |
| LP | 1 | Karl Tu’inukuafe | (substituted off) 58' |
Replacements:
| HK | 16 | Liam Coltman | (substituted on) 75' |
| PR | 17 | Tim Perry | (substituted on) 58' |
| PR | 18 | Ofa Tu'ungafasi | (substituted on) 47' |
| LK | 19 | Patrick Tuipulotu | (substituted on) 58' |
| FL | 20 | Ardie Savea | (substituted on) 68' |
| SH | 21 | TJ Perenara | (substituted on) 49' |
| CE | 22 | Jack Goodhue | (substituted on) 58' |
| FH | 23 | Damian McKenzie | (substituted on) 58' |
Coach:
(New Zealand) Steve Hansen

| FB | 15 | Willie le Roux | (yellow card) 66' to 76' |
| RW | 14 | Jesse Kriel |
| OC | 13 | Lukhanyo Am | | (substituted off) 40' |
| IC | 12 | Damian de Allende | | (substituted off) 47' |
| LW | 11 | Aphiwe Dyantyi |
| FH | 10 | Handré Pollard |
| SH | 9 | Faf de Klerk |
| N8 | 8 | Warren Whiteley |
| OF | 7 | Pieter-Steph du Toit |
| BF | 6 | Siya Kolisi (c) | | (substituted off) 65' |
| RL | 5 | Franco Mostert |
| LL | 4 | Eben Etzebeth | | (substituted off) 50' |
| TP | 3 | Frans Malherbe | | (substituted off) 64' |
| HK | 2 | Malcolm Marx | | (substituted off) 68' |
| LP | 1 | Steven Kitshoff | | (substituted off) 65' |
Replacements:
| HK | 16 | Bongi Mbonambi | | (substituted on) 68' |
| PR | 17 | Tendai Mtawarira | | (substituted on) 65' |
| PR | 18 | Wilco Louw | | (substituted on) 64' |
| LK | 19 | RG Snyman | | (substituted on) 50' |
| LK | 20 | Francois Louw | | (substituted on) 65' |
| SH | 21 | Ross Cronjé |
| CE | 22 | Elton Jantjies | | (substituted on) 47' |
| FB | 23 | Cheslin Kolbe | | (substituted on) 40' |
Coach:
(South Africa) Rassie Erasmus

Man of the Match:
Handré Pollard (South Africa)

Touch judges:
Pascal Gaüzère (France)
Nic Berry (Australia)
Television match official:
Rowan Kitt (England)

- South Africa recorded their first win against New Zealand in New Zealand since their 32–29 win in 2009.

15 September 2018
20:05 AEST (UTC+10)

| (1 BP) Australia | 19–23 | Argentina |
| Try: Genia 10' c Folau 18' c Haylett-Petty 54' m Con: To'omua (2/3) 11', 19' | Report | Try: Sánchez 14' c Delguy 35' c Con: Sánchez (2/2) 15', 36'; Pen: Boffelli (2/2) 4', 76'; Sánchez (1/1) 47' |

Robina Stadium, Gold Coast
Attendance: 16,019
Referee: John Lacey (Ireland)

| FB | 15 | Dane Haylett-Petty |
| RW | 14 | Israel Folau |
| OC | 13 | Reece Hodge |
| IC | 12 | Matt To'omua | (substituted off) 59' |
| LW | 11 | Marika Koroibete | (substituted off) 69' |
| FH | 10 | Kurtley Beale |
| SH | 9 | Will Genia | (substituted off) 69' |
| N8 | 8 | Pete Samu | (substituted off) 43' |
| OF | 7 | David Pocock (c) |
| BF | 6 | Lukhan Tui |
| RL | 5 | Izack Rodda | | (substituted off) 58' | (substituted on) 67' |
| LL | 4 | Rory Arnold | (substituted off) 46' | (substituted on) 58' | (substituted off) 67' |
| TP | 3 | Allan Alaalatoa | 29' to 36' | | (substituted off) 52' |
| HK | 2 | Tatafu Polota-Nau | (substituted off) 40' |
| LP | 1 | Scott Sio | (substituted off) 58' |
Replacements:
| HK | 16 | Folau Fainga'a | (substituted on) 40' |
| PR | 17 | Sekope Kepu | (substituted on) 58' |
| PR | 18 | Taniela Tupou | (substituted on) 29' | (substituted off) 36' | (substituted on) 52' |
| LK | 19 | Adam Coleman | (substituted on) 46' |
| FL | 20 | Ned Hanigan | (substituted on) 43' |
| SH | 21 | Nick Phipps | (substituted on) 69' |
| FH | 22 | Bernard Foley | (substituted on) 59' |
| WG | 23 | Jack Maddocks | (substituted on) 69' |
Coach:
(Australia) Michael Cheika

| FB | 15 | Emiliano Boffelli |
| RW | 14 | Bautista Delguy |
| OC | 13 | Matías Moroni |
| IC | 12 | Jerónimo de la Fuente | (substituted off) 74' |
| LW | 11 | Ramiro Moyano | (substituted off) 32' |
| FH | 10 | Nicolás Sánchez |
| SH | 9 | Gonzalo Bertranou |
| N8 | 8 | Javier Ortega Desio |
| OF | 7 | Marcos Kremer | (substituted off) 67' |
| BF | 6 | Pablo Matera |
| RL | 5 | Tomás Lavanini | (substituted off) 24' | (substituted on) 32' |
| LL | 4 | Guido Petti | | | (substituted off) 69' |
| TP | 3 | Santiago Medrano | (substituted off) 67' |
| HK | 2 | Agustín Creevy (c) | (substituted off) 67' |
| LP | 1 | Nahuel Tetaz Chaparro | (substituted off) 67' |
Replacements:
| HK | 16 | Julián Montoya | (substituted on) 67' |
| PR | 17 | Santiago García Botta | (substituted on) 67' |
| PR | 18 | Juan Pablo Zeiss | (substituted on) 67' |
| LK | 19 | Matías Alemanno | (substituted on) 24' | (substituted off) 32' | (substituted on) 69' |
| FL | 20 | Juan Manuel Leguizamón | (substituted on) 67' |
| SH | 21 | Martín Landajo |
| CE | 22 | Bautista Ezcurra | (substituted on) 32' |
| FB | 23 | Juan Cruz Mallia | (substituted on) 74' |
Coach:
(Argentina) Mario Ledesma

Man of the Match:
Nicolás Sánchez (Argentina)

Touch judges:
Glen Jackson (New Zealand)
Paul Williams (New Zealand)
Television match official:
Glenn Newman (New Zealand)

Notes:

- Argentina recorded their first win against Australia in Australia since their 18–3 win in 1983.
- This win saw Argentina achieved two wins in a single Rugby Championship for the first time.
- With this loss (and South Africa's victory), Australia drops to a record low seventh place on the World Rugby Rankings.

=== Round 5 ===
29 September 2018
17:05 SAST (UTC+02)

| South Africa | 23–12 | Australia |
| Try: Dyantyi 1' c De Klerk 20' c Con: Pollard (2/2) 1', 21'; Pen: Pollard (3/3) 33', 40', 45' | Report | Try: Hodge 25' m Genia 28' c Con: To'omua (1/2) 29' |

Nelson Mandela Bay Stadium, Port Elizabeth
Attendance: 41,332
Referee: Jérôme Garcès (France)

| FB | 15 | Willie le Roux |
| RW | 14 | Cheslin Kolbe |
| OC | 13 | Jesse Kriel |
| IC | 12 | André Esterhuizen |
| LW | 11 | Aphiwe Dyantyi | (yellow card) 64' to 74' |
| FH | 10 | Handré Pollard |
| SH | 9 | Faf de Klerk |
| N8 | 8 | Sikhumbuzo Notshe | | (substituted off) 44' |
| OF | 7 | Pieter-Steph du Toit |
| BF | 6 | Siya Kolisi (c) |
| RL | 5 | Franco Mostert |
| LL | 4 | Eben Etzebeth | | (substituted off) 76' |
| TP | 3 | Frans Malherbe | | (substituted off) 62' |
| HK | 2 | Malcolm Marx | | (substituted off) 69' |
| LP | 1 | Tendai Mtawarira | | (substituted off) 42' |
Replacements:
| HK | 16 | Bongi Mbonambi | | (substituted on) 69' |
| PR | 17 | Steven Kitshoff | | (substituted on) 42' |
| PR | 18 | Wilco Louw | | (substituted on) 62' |
| LK | 19 | RG Snyman | | (substituted on) 76' |
| FL | 20 | Marco van Staden | | (substituted on) 44' |
| SH | 21 | Embrose Papier |
| FH | 22 | Elton Jantjies |
| FH | 23 | Damian Willemse |
Coach:
(South Africa) Rassie Erasmus

| FB | 15 | Dane Haylett-Petty |
| RW | 14 | Israel Folau |
| OC | 13 | Reece Hodge |
| IC | 12 | Matt To'omua |
| LW | 11 | Marika Koroibete | (substituted off) 31' |
| FH | 10 | Kurtley Beale |
| SH | 9 | Will Genia | (substituted off) 69' |
| N8 | 8 | David Pocock |
| OF | 7 | Michael Hooper (c) |
| BF | 6 | Ned Hanigan |
| LL | 5 | Adam Coleman | (substituted off) 69' |
| RL | 4 | Izack Rodda | (substituted off) 69' |
| TP | 3 | Taniela Tupou | (substituted off) 49' |
| HK | 2 | Folau Fainga'a | (substituted off) 62' |
| LP | 1 | Scott Sio | (substituted off) 49' |
Replacements:
| HK | 16 | Brandon Paenga-Amosa | (substituted on) 62' |
| PR | 17 | Sekope Kepu | (substituted on) 49' |
| PR | 18 | Allan Alaalatoa | (substituted on) 49' |
| LK | 19 | Rory Arnold | (substituted on) 69' |
| LK | 20 | Rob Simmons | (substituted on) 69' |
| SH | 21 | Nick Phipps | (substituted on) 69' |
| FH | 22 | Bernard Foley | | (substituted on) 58' |
| WG | 23 | Jack Maddocks | (substituted on) 31' | (substituted off) 58' |
Coach:
(Australia) Michael Cheika

Man of the Match:
Pieter-Steph du Toit (South Africa)

Touch judges:
Wayne Barnes (England)
Matthew Carley (England)
Television match official:
Graham Hughes (England)

Notes:

- Scott Sio (Australia) earned his 50th test cap.

29 September 2018
19:40 AST (UTC-03)

| Argentina | 17–35 | New Zealand (1 BP) |
| Try: Cubelli 57' c Boffelli 67' c Con: Sánchez (2/2) 58', 67'; Pen: Sánchez (1/1) 5' | Report | Try: Ioane (2) 7' c, 29' c Naholo 16' c Tuipulotu 54' c Lienert-Brown 72' c Con: B. Barrett (4/4) 8', 17' 31', 56'; Mo'unga (1/1) 72' |

José Amalfitani Stadium, Buenos Aires
Attendance: 50,000
Referee: Mathieu Raynal (France)

| FB | 15 | Emiliano Boffelli |
| RW | 14 | Bautista Delguy | (substituted off) 33' |
| OC | 13 | Jerónimo de la Fuente |
| IC | 12 | Bautista Ezcurra | (substituted off) 62' |
| LW | 11 | Matías Moroni |
| FH | 10 | Nicolás Sánchez |
| SH | 9 | Gonzalo Bertranou | (substituted off) 50' |
| N8 | 8 | Javier Ortega Desio |
| OF | 7 | Marcos Kremer | (substituted off) 70' |
| BF | 6 | Pablo Matera |
| RL | 5 | Tomás Lavanini |
| LL | 4 | Guido Petti | (substituted off) 53' |
| TP | 3 | Ramiro Herrera | (substituted off) 53' |
| HK | 2 | Agustín Creevy (c) | (substituted off) 50' |
| LP | 1 | Nahuel Tetaz Chaparro | (substituted off) 57' |
Replacements:
| HK | 16 | Julián Montoya | (substituted on) 50' |
| PR | 17 | Juan Pablo Zeiss | (substituted on) 57' |
| PR | 18 | Santiago Medrano | (substituted on) 53' |
| LK | 19 | Matías Alemanno | (substituted on) 53' |
| FL | 20 | Juan Manuel Leguizamón | (substituted on) 70' |
| SH | 21 | Tomás Cubelli | (substituted on) 50' |
| CE | 22 | Matías Orlando | (substituted on) 62' |
| WG | 23 | Sebastián Cancelliere | (substituted on) 33' |
Coach:
(Argentina) Mario Ledesma

| FB | 15 | Ben Smith | | (substituted off) 58' |
| RW | 14 | Waisake Naholo |
| OC | 13 | Ryan Crotty |
| IC | 12 | Sonny Bill Williams | (yellow card) 36' to 46' | (substituted off) 56' |
| LW | 11 | Rieko Ioane |
| FH | 10 | Beauden Barrett |
| SH | 9 | TJ Perenara | | (substituted off) 66' |
| N8 | 8 | Ardie Savea |
| OF | 7 | Sam Cane |
| BF | 6 | Shannon Frizell | | (substituted off) 66' |
| RL | 5 | Scott Barrett |
| LL | 4 | Sam Whitelock (c) | | (substituted off) 50' |
| TP | 3 | Ofa Tu'ungafasi | | (substituted off) 51' |
| HK | 2 | Codie Taylor | | (substituted off) 59' |
| LP | 1 | Karl Tu’inukuafe | | (substituted off) 56' |
Replacements:
| HK | 16 | Nathan Harris | | (substituted on) 59' |
| PR | 17 | Tim Perry | | (substituted on) 56' |
| PR | 18 | Angus Ta'avao | | (substituted on) 51' |
| LK | 19 | Patrick Tuipulotu | | (substituted on) 50' |
| FL | 20 | Jackson Hemopo | | (substituted on) 66' |
| SH | 21 | Aaron Smith | | (substituted on) 66' |
| FH | 22 | Richie Mo'unga | | (substituted on) 58' |
| CE | 23 | Anton Lienert-Brown | | (substituted on) 56' |
Coach:
(New Zealand) Steve Hansen

Man of the Match:
Ardie Savea (New Zealand)

Touch judges:
Jaco Peyper (South Africa)
Marius van der Westhuizen (South Africa)
Television match official:
David Grashoff (England)

Notes:

- Angus Ta'avao (New Zealand) made his international debut.
- TJ Perenara (New Zealand) earned his 50th test cap.

=== Round 6 ===
6 October 2018
17:05 SAST (UTC+02)

| (1 BP) South Africa | 30–32 | New Zealand |
| Try: Kriel 44' c De Allende 52' c Kolbe 59' c Con: Pollard (3/3) 45', 53', 60'; Pen: Pollard (3/3) 4', 13', 48' | Report | Try: A. Smith 54' c Ioane 62' m S. Barrett 76' c Savea 79' c Con: Mo'unga (3/4) 55', 76', 80'; Pen: B. Barrett (2/2) 26', 36' |

Loftus Versfeld Stadium, Pretoria
Attendance: 51,762
Referee: Angus Gardner (Australia)

| FB | 15 | Willie le Roux | (substituted off) 66' |
| RW | 14 | Cheslin Kolbe |
| OC | 13 | Jesse Kriel |
| IC | 12 | Damian de Allende | (substituted off) 78' |
| LW | 11 | Aphiwe Dyantyi |
| FH | 10 | Handré Pollard |
| SH | 9 | Faf de Klerk | (substituted off) 73' |
| N8 | 8 | Francois Louw | (substituted off) 70' |
| OF | 7 | Pieter-Steph du Toit |
| BF | 6 | Siya Kolisi (c) |
| RL | 5 | Franco Mostert |
| LL | 4 | Eben Etzebeth | (substituted off) 63' |
| TP | 3 | Frans Malherbe | (substituted off) 60' |
| HK | 2 | Malcolm Marx | (substituted off) 73' |
| LP | 1 | Steven Kitshoff | (substituted off) 74' |
Replacements:
| HK | 16 | Bongi Mbonambi | (substituted on) 73' |
| PR | 17 | Tendai Mtawarira | (substituted on) 74' |
| PR | 18 | Vincent Koch | (substituted on) 60' |
| LK | 19 | RG Snyman | (substituted on) 63' |
| FL | 20 | Sikhumbuzo Notshe | (substituted on) 70' |
| SH | 21 | Embrose Papier | (substituted on) 73' |
| FH | 22 | Elton Jantjies | (substituted on) 78' |
| FH | 23 | Damian Willemse | (substituted on) 66' |
Coach:
(South Africa) Rassie Erasmus

| FB | 15 | Ben Smith |
| RW | 14 | Waisake Naholo | (substituted off) 51' |
| OC | 13 | Ryan Crotty |
| IC | 12 | Sonny Bill Williams | (substituted off) 60' |
| LW | 11 | Rieko Ioane |
| FH | 10 | Beauden Barrett |
| SH | 9 | Aaron Smith | (substituted off) 70' |
| N8 | 8 | Kieran Read (c) |
| OF | 7 | Sam Cane | (substituted off) 36' |
| BF | 6 | Shannon Frizell | (substituted off) 46' |
| RL | 5 | Scott Barrett |
| LL | 4 | Sam Whitelock |
| TP | 3 | Owen Franks | (substituted off) 46' |
| HK | 2 | Codie Taylor | (substituted off) 70' |
| LP | 1 | Karl Tu’inukuafe | (substituted off) 46' | (substituted on) 70' | (substituted off) 78' |
Replacements:
| HK | 16 | Nathan Harris | (substituted on) 70' |
| PR | 17 | Tim Perry | (substituted on) 46' | (substituted off) 70' | (substituted on) 78' |
| PR | 18 | Ofa Tu'ungafasi | (substituted on) 46' |
| LK | 19 | Patrick Tuipulotu | (substituted on) 46' |
| FL | 20 | Ardie Savea | (substituted on) 36' |
| SH | 21 | TJ Perenara | (substituted on) 70' |
| FH | 22 | Richie Mo'unga | (substituted on) 51' |
| CE | 23 | Anton Lienert-Brown | (substituted on) 60' |
Coach:
(New Zealand) Steve Hansen

Man of the Match:
Malcolm Marx (South Africa)

Touch judges:
Jérôme Garcès (France)
Matthew Carley (England)
Television match official:
Graham Hughes (England)

Notes:

- Willie le Roux (South Africa) earned his 50th test cap.
- New Zealand retain the Freedom Cup.

6 October 2018
19:40 AST (UTC-03)

| Argentina | 34–45 | Australia |
| Try: Matera 2' c Boffelli 4' c Orlando 27' c Gonzalez Iglesias 31' c Con: Sánchez (3/3) 3', 5', 28'; Gonzalez Iglesias (1/1) 32'; Pen: Gonzalez Iglesias (2/2) 38', 61' | Report | Try: Hooper 14' c Rodda 44' c Folau 48' c Haylett-Petty (2) 51' c, 66' c Pocock 64' c Con: Foley (6/6) 15', 45', 49', 53', 65', 67'; Pen: Foley (1/1) 75' |

Estadio Padre Ernesto Martearena, Salta
Attendance: 20,512
Referee: Jaco Peyper (South Africa)

| FB | 15 | Emiliano Boffelli |
| RW | 14 | Matías Moroni | (substituted off) 67' |
| OC | 13 | Matías Orlando |
| IC | 12 | Jerónimo de la Fuente |
| LW | 11 | Ramiro Moyano |
| FH | 10 | Nicolás Sánchez | (substituted off) 29' |
| SH | 9 | Gonzalo Bertranou | (substituted off) 59' |
| N8 | 8 | Javier Ortega Desio | (substituted off) 67' |
| OF | 7 | Marcos Kremer |
| BF | 6 | Pablo Matera |
| RL | 5 | Tomás Lavanini | (substituted off) 71' |
| LL | 4 | Guido Petti |
| TP | 3 | Ramiro Herrera | (substituted off) 52' |
| HK | 2 | Agustín Creevy (c) | (substituted off) 52' |
| LP | 1 | Nahuel Tetaz Chaparro | (substituted off) 67' |
Replacements:
| HK | 16 | Julián Montoya | (substituted on) 52' |
| PR | 17 | Santiago García Botta | (substituted on) 67' |
| PR | 18 | Santiago Medrano | (substituted on) 52' |
| LK | 19 | Matías Alemanno | (substituted on) 71' |
| FL | 20 | Juan Manuel Leguizamón | (substituted on) 67' |
| SH | 21 | Tomás Cubelli | (substituted on) 59' |
| CE | 22 | Santiago González Iglesias | (substituted on) 29' |
| WG | 23 | Sebastián Cancelliere | (substituted on) 67' |
Coach:
(Argentina) Mario Ledesma

| FB | 15 | Dane Haylett-Petty |
| RW | 14 | Israel Folau |
| OC | 13 | Reece Hodge |
| IC | 12 | Kurtley Beale | | (substituted off) 75' |
| LW | 11 | Marika Koroibete |
| FH | 10 | Bernard Foley |
| SH | 9 | Will Genia | | (substituted off) 68' |
| N8 | 8 | David Pocock |
| OF | 7 | Michael Hooper (c) |
| BF | 6 | Ned Hanigan | | (substituted off) 78' |
| LL | 5 | Adam Coleman |
| RL | 4 | Izack Rodda | | (substituted off) 72' |
| TP | 3 | Taniela Tupou | | (substituted off) 41' |
| HK | 2 | Folau Fainga'a | | (substituted off) 41' | (substituted on) 78' |
| LP | 1 | Scott Sio | | (substituted off) 41' | (substituted on) 73' |
Replacements:
| HK | 16 | Tolu Latu | (yellow card) 77' to 80' | (substituted on) 41' |
| PR | 17 | Sekope Kepu | | (substituted on) 41' | (substituted off) 73' |
| PR | 18 | Allan Alaalatoa | | (substituted on) 41' |
| LK | 19 | Rob Simmons | | (substituted on) 72' |
| N8 | 20 | Caleb Timu |
| SH | 21 | Nick Phipps | | (substituted on) 68' |
| FH | 22 | Matt To'omua | | (substituted on) 75' |
| FB | 23 | Tom Banks |
Coach:
(Australia) Michael Cheika

Man of the Match:
Dane Haylett-Petty (Australia)

Touch judges:
Mathieu Raynal (France)
Marius van der Westhuizen (South Africa)
Television match official:
David Grashoff (England)

Notes:

- Matías Alemanno and Nahuel Tetaz Chaparro (both Argentina) made earned their 50th test cap.
- Australia, who trailed by 24 points at half-time (31–7), recorded the second-biggest comeback in Test rugby, and the biggest comeback win for a tier one team.
- Australia retain the Puma Trophy.

== Statistics ==
=== Points scorers ===
| Pos. | Player | Team | Pts. |
|---|---|---|---|
| 1 | Nicolás Sánchez | Argentina | 67 |
| 2 | Beauden Barrett | New Zealand | 61 |
| 3 | Handré Pollard | South Africa | 47 |
| 4 | Aphiwe Dyantyi | South Africa | 25 |
| 4 | Rieko Ioane | New Zealand | 25 |
| 6 | Richie Mo'unga | New Zealand | 24 |
| 7 | Bernard Foley | Australia | 22 |
| 8 | Emiliano Boffelli | Argentina | 21 |
| 8 | Matt To'omua | Australia | 21 |
| 10 | Reece Hodge | Australia | 16 |

=== Try scorers ===
| Pos. | Player | Team | Tries |
|---|---|---|---|
| 1 | Beauden Barrett | New Zealand | 5 |
| 1 | Aphiwe Dyantyi | South Africa | 5 |
| 1 | Rieko Ioane | New Zealand | 5 |
| 4 | Nicolás Sánchez | Argentina | 4 |
| 5 | Emiliano Boffelli | Argentina | 3 |
| 5 | Bautista Delguy | Argentina | 3 |
| 5 | Will Genia | Australia | 3 |
| 5 | Dane Haylett-Petty | Australia | 3 |
| 5 | Makazole Mapimpi | South Africa | 3 |
| 5 | Waisake Naholo | New Zealand | 3 |
| 5 | Aaron Smith | New Zealand | 3 |

== Squads ==
| Nation | Match venues | | | Head coach | Captain | World Rugby Rankings | |
| Nation | Name | City | Capacity | Head coach | Captain | Start (Note: As of 13 August 2018) | End (Note: As of 8 October 2018) |
|---|---|---|---|---|---|---|---|
| Argentina | José Amalfitani Stadium | Buenos Aires | 49,540 | Mario Ledesma | Agustín Creevy | 10th | 9th |
| Argentina | Estadio Malvinas Argentinas | Mendoza | 40,268 | Mario Ledesma | Agustín Creevy | 10th | 9th |
| Argentina | Estadio Padre Ernesto Martearena | Salta | 20,408 | Mario Ledesma | Agustín Creevy | 10th | 9th |
| Australia | Stadium Australia | Sydney | 83,500 | Michael Cheika | Michael Hooper; David Pocock | 5th | 7th |
| Australia | Lang Park | Brisbane | 52,500 | Michael Cheika | Michael Hooper; David Pocock | 5th | 7th |
| Australia | Robina Stadium | Gold Coast | 27,400 | Michael Cheika | Michael Hooper; David Pocock | 5th | 7th |
| New Zealand | Eden Park | Auckland | 50,000 | Steve Hansen | Kieran Read | 1st | 1st |
| New Zealand | Wellington Regional Stadium | Wellington | 34,500 | Steve Hansen | Kieran Read | 1st | 1st |
| New Zealand | Trafalgar Park | Nelson | 18,000 | Steve Hansen | Kieran Read | 1st | 1st |
| South Africa | Kings Park Stadium | Durban | 52,000 | Rassie Erasmus | Siya Kolisi | 6th | 5th |
| South Africa | Loftus Versfeld Stadium | Pretoria | 51,762 | Rassie Erasmus | Siya Kolisi | 6th | 5th |
| South Africa | Nelson Mandela Bay Stadium | Port Elizabeth | 48,000 | Rassie Erasmus | Siya Kolisi | 6th | 5th |

Note: Ages, caps and clubs/franchises are of 18 August 2018 – the starting date of the tournament

=== Argentina ===
On 6 August, newly appointed head coach Mario Ledesma named a 36-man squad for the Championship.

^{1} Ahead of the traveling to South Africa for the opening match, Tomás Lezana joined the squad after recovering from injury.

^{2} On 9 August, Juan Figallo became the first European based player to be selected for the national side since the 2015 World Cup, after a change of selection policy under Ledesma.

^{3} On 19 August, Santiago Álvarez, Facundo Bosch and Santiago Carreras joined the ahead of the round 2 home clash against South Africa.

^{4} On 27 August, Gaston Cortes joined the squad for the Oceania leg of the Championship in rounds 3 and 4.

^{5} On 19 September, Ramiro Herrera, Matías Osadczuk, Lucas Paulos and Enrique Pieretto joined were added as part of the training squad ahead of the fifth round clash with New Zealand.

^{6} On 24 September, Manuel Montero joined the squad as injury cover for Ramiro Moyano.

Note: Flags indicate national union for the club/province as defined by World Rugby.

| Player | Position | Date of birth (age) | Caps | Club/province |
|---|---|---|---|---|
| Facundo Bosch ^{3} | Hooker | 8 August 1991 (aged 27) | 0 | (France) Agen |
| Agustín Creevy (c) | Hooker | 15 March 1985 (aged 33) | 74 | (Argentina) Jaguares |
| Diego Fortuny | Hooker | 27 September 1991 (aged 26) | 0 | (Argentina) Jaguares |
| Julián Montoya | Hooker | 29 October 1993 (aged 24) | 44 | (Argentina) Jaguares |
| Marco Ciccioli | Prop | 6 November 1995 (aged 22) | 0 | (Argentina) CASI |
| Gaston Cortes ^{4} | Prop | 6 October 1985 (aged 32) | 4 | (England) Leicester Tigers |
| Lucas Favre | Prop | 20 November 1996 (aged 21) | 0 | (Argentina) Lomas |
| Juan Figallo ^{2} | Prop | 25 March 1988 (age 38) | 24 | (England) Saracens |
| Santiago García Botta | Prop | 19 June 1992 (aged 26) | 25 | (Argentina) Jaguares |
| Ramiro Herrera ^{5} | Prop | 14 February 1989 (aged 29) | 37 | (France) Stade Français |
| Santiago Medrano | Prop | 6 May 1996 (aged 22) | 3 | (Argentina) Jaguares |
| Enrique Pieretto ^{5} | Prop | 15 December 1994 (aged 23) | 24 | (Argentina) Jaguares |
| Nahuel Tetaz Chaparro | Prop | 11 June 1989 (aged 29) | 44 | (Argentina) Jaguares |
| Mayco Vivas | Prop | 2 June 1998 (aged 20) | 0 | (Argentina) Atlético del Rosario |
| Juan Pablo Zeiss | Prop | 2 August 1989 (aged 29) | 0 | (Argentina) Los Matreros |
| Matías Alemanno | Lock | 5 December 1991 (aged 26) | 44 | (Argentina) Jaguares |
| Ignacio Larrague | Lock | 25 October 1995 (aged 22) | 2 | (Argentina) CASI |
| Tomás Lavanini | Lock | 22 January 1993 (aged 25) | 41 | (Argentina) Jaguares |
| Franco Molina | Lock | 28 August 1997 (aged 20) | 0 | (Argentina) Jockey Córdoba |
| Guido Petti | Lock | 17 November 1994 (aged 23) | 36 | (Argentina) Jaguares |
| Lucas Paulos ^{5} | Lock | 9 January 1998 (aged 20) | 0 | (Argentina) Olivos |
| Santiago Grondana | Flanker | 25 July 1998 (aged 20) | 0 | (Argentina) Champagnat |
| Marcos Kremer | Flanker | 30 July 1997 (aged 21) | 15 | (Argentina) Jaguares |
| Juan Manuel Leguizamón | Flanker | 6 June 1983 (aged 35) | 82 | (Argentina) Jaguares |
| Pablo Matera | Flanker | 18 July 1993 (aged 25) | 49 | (Argentina) Jaguares |
| Javier Ortega Desio | Flanker | 14 June 1990 (aged 28) | 42 | (Argentina) Jaguares |
| Tomás Lezana ^{1} | Flanker | 16 February 1994 (aged 24) | 24 | (Argentina) Jaguares |
| Rodrigo Bruni | Number 8 | 3 September 1993 (aged 24) | 0 | (Argentina) San Luis |
| Gonzalo Bertranou | Scrum-half | 31 December 1993 (aged 24) | 12 | (Argentina) Jaguares |
| Tomás Cubelli | Scrum-half | 12 June 1989 (aged 29) | 63 | (Argentina) Jaguares |
| Martín Landajo | Scrum-half | 14 June 1988 (aged 30) | 81 | (Argentina) Jaguares |
| Joaquín Díaz Bonilla | Fly-half | 12 April 1989 (aged 29) | 0 | (Argentina) Jaguares |
| Nicolás Sánchez | Fly-half | 26 October 1988 (aged 29) | 65 | (Argentina) Jaguares |
| Santiago Álvarez ^{3} | Centre | 17 February 1994 (aged 24) | 0 | (Argentina) Jaguares |
| Jerónimo de la Fuente | Centre | 24 February 1991 (aged 27) | 38 | (Argentina) Jaguares |
| Bautista Ezcurra | Centre | 21 April 1995 (aged 23) | 1 | (Argentina) Jaguares |
| Santiago González Iglesias | Centre | 16 June 1988 (aged 30) | 41 | (Argentina) Jaguares |
| Matías Moroni | Centre | 29 March 1991 (aged 27) | 31 | (Argentina) Jaguares |
| Matías Orlando | Centre | 14 November 1991 (aged 26) | 34 | (Argentina) Jaguares |
| Matías Osadczuk ^{5} | Centre | 22 April 1997 (aged 21) | 0 | (Argentina) SITAS |
| Sebastián Cancelliere | Wing | 17 September 1993 (aged 24) | 6 | (Argentina) Jaguares |
| Bautista Delguy | Wing | 22 April 1997 (aged 21) | 3 | (Argentina) Jaguares |
| Manuel Montero ^{6} | Wing | 20 November 1991 (age 34) | 27 | (Argentina) Pucará |
| Ramiro Moyano | Wing | 28 May 1990 (aged 28) | 22 | (Argentina) Jaguares |
| Emiliano Boffelli | Fullback | 16 January 1995 (aged 23) | 14 | (Argentina) Jaguares |
| Santiago Carreras ^{3} | Fullback | 30 March 1998 (aged 20) | 0 | (Argentina) Córdoba Athletic |
| Juan Cruz Mallia | Fullback | 11 September 1996 (aged 21) | 1 | (Argentina) Jaguares |

=== Australia ===
On 5 August, Michael Cheika named a 36-man extended squad ahead of the Championship.

^{1} On 21 September, Jake Gordon and Angus Cottrell were added to the squad for the final two rounds of the Championship, with the latter replacing Lukhan Tui who withdrew from the squad for personal reasons.

| Player | Position | Date of birth (age) | Caps | Franchise/province |
|---|---|---|---|---|
| Folau Fainga'a | Hooker | 5 May 1995 (aged 23) | 0 | (Australia) Brumbies / Canberra Vikings |
| Tolu Latu | Hooker | 23 February 1993 (aged 25) | 7 | (Australia) Waratahs / NSW Country Eagles |
| Brandon Paenga-Amosa | Hooker | 25 December 1995 (aged 22) | 3 | (Australia) Queensland Reds / Brisbane City |
| Tatafu Polota-Nau | Hooker | 26 July 1985 (aged 33) | 82 | (England) Leicester Tigers |
| Jermaine Ainsley | Prop | 8 August 1995 (aged 23) | 0 | (Australia) Melbourne Rebels / Melbourne Rising |
| Allan Alaalatoa | Prop | 28 January 1994 (aged 24) | 22 | (Australia) Brumbies / Canberra Vikings |
| Sekope Kepu | Prop | 5 February 1986 (aged 32) | 94 | (Australia) Waratahs / Sydney Rays |
| Tom Robertson | Prop | 28 August 1994 (aged 23) | 21 | (Australia) Waratahs / NSW Country Eagles |
| Scott Sio | Prop | 16 October 1991 (aged 26) | 46 | (Australia) Brumbies / Canberra Vikings |
| Taniela Tupou | Prop | 10 May 1996 (aged 22) | 4 | (Australia) Queensland Reds / Queensland Country |
| Rory Arnold | Lock | 1 July 1990 (aged 28) | 15 | (Australia) Brumbies / Canberra Vikings |
| Adam Coleman | Lock | 7 October 1991 (aged 26) | 23 | (Australia) Melbourne Rebels / Melbourne Rising |
| Izack Rodda | Lock | 20 August 1996 (aged 21) | 7 | (Australia) Queensland Reds / Queensland Country |
| Rob Simmons | Lock | 19 April 1989 (aged 29) | 85 | (Australia) Waratahs / Sydney Rays |
| Lukhan Tui | Lock | 19 September 1996 (aged 21) | 7 | (Australia) Queensland Reds / Brisbane City |
| Angus Cottrell ^{1} | Flanker | 20 November 1989 (aged 28) | 0 | (Australia) Melbourne Rebels / Melbourne Rising |
| Ned Hanigan | Flanker | 11 April 1995 (aged 23) | 13 | (Australia) Waratahs / NSW Country Eagles |
| Michael Hooper (c) | Flanker | 29 October 1991 (aged 26) | 82 | (Australia) Waratahs / Sydney Rays |
| David Pocock | Flanker | 23 April 1988 (aged 30) | 69 | (Australia) Brumbies / (Japan) Panasonic Wild Knights |
| Peter Samu | Flanker | 17 December 1991 (aged 26) | 3 | (New Zealand) Crusaders / (Australia) Canberra Vikings |
| Caleb Timu | Number 8 | 22 February 1994 (aged 24) | 2 | (Australia) Queensland Reds / Queensland Country |
| Will Genia | Scrum-half | 17 January 1988 (aged 30) | 90 | (Australia) Melbourne Rebels / Melbourne Rising |
| Jake Gordon ^{1} | Scrum-half | 6 July 1993 (aged 25) | 0 | (Australia) Waratahs / NSW Country Eagles |
| Nick Phipps | Scrum-half | 9 January 1989 (aged 29) | 64 | (Australia) Waratahs / Sydney Rays |
| Joe Powell | Scrum-half | 11 April 1994 (aged 24) | 4 | (Australia) Brumbies / Canberra Vikings |
| Bernard Foley | Fly-half | 8 September 1989 (aged 28) | 58 | (Australia) Waratahs / NSW Country Eagles |
| Matt To'omua | Fly-half | 2 January 1990 (aged 28) | 33 | (England) Leicester Tigers |
| Kurtley Beale | Centre | 6 January 1989 (aged 29) | 74 | (Australia) Waratahs / Sydney Rays |
| Reece Hodge | Centre | 26 August 1994 (aged 23) | 27 | (Australia) Melbourne Rebels / Melbourne Rising |
| Bill Meakes | Centre | 23 February 1991 (aged 27) | 0 | (Australia) Melbourne Rebels / Melbourne Rising |
| Jordan Petaia | Centre | 14 March 2000 (aged 18) | 0 | (Australia) Queensland Reds / Queensland Country |
| Curtis Rona | Centre | 26 May 1992 (aged 26) | 3 | (Australia) Waratahs / Sydney Rays |
| Dane Haylett-Petty | Wing | 18 June 1989 (aged 29) | 21 | (Australia) Melbourne Rebels / Western Force |
| Marika Koroibete | Wing | 26 July 1992 (aged 26) | 11 | (Australia) Melbourne Rebels / Melbourne Rising |
| Jack Maddocks | Wing | 5 February 1997 (aged 21) | 0 | (Australia) Melbourne Rebels / Melbourne Rising |
| Sefa Naivalu | Wing | 7 January 1992 (aged 26) | 7 | (Australia) Melbourne Rebels / Melbourne Rising |
| Tom Banks | Fullback | 18 June 1994 (aged 24) | 0 | (Australia) Brumbies / Canberra Vikings |
| Israel Folau | Fullback | 3 April 1989 (aged 29) | 65 | (Australia) Waratahs / Sydney Rays |

=== New Zealand ===
On 6 August 2018, Hansen named a 33-man squad ahead of the Championship.

Liam Coltman and Ngani Laumape were included in the squad as injury covers for Dane Coles and Sonny Bill Williams respectively.

^{1} On 16 August, Ofa Tu'ungafasi, after being named in the match-day team for the opening round, was withdrawn due to injury and Jeffery Toomaga-Allen joined the squad as a precautionary injury cover.

^{2} On 30 August, Angus Ta'avao joined the squad as an injury replacement for Joe Moody who was ruled out of the rest of the Championship.

^{3} On 9 September, Patrick Tuipulotu joined the squad as an injury replacement for Brodie Retallick.

Note: Flags indicate national union for the club/province as defined by World Rugby.

| Player | Position | Date of birth (age) | Caps | Club/province |
|---|---|---|---|---|
| Dane Coles | Hooker | 10 December 1986 (aged 31) | 56 | Hurricanes / Wellington |
| Liam Coltman | Hooker | 25 January 1990 (aged 28) | 2 | Highlanders / Otago |
| Nathan Harris | Hooker | 8 March 1992 (aged 26) | 13 | Chiefs / Bay of Plenty |
| Codie Taylor | Hooker | 31 March 1991 (aged 27) | 32 | Crusaders / Canterbury |
| Owen Franks | Prop | 23 December 1987 (aged 30) | 98 | Crusaders / Canterbury |
| Joe Moody | Prop | 18 September 1988 (aged 29) | 34 | Crusaders / Canterbury |
| Tim Perry | Prop | 1 August 1988 (aged 30) | 0 | Crusaders / Tasman |
| Angus Ta'avao ^{2} | Prop | 22 March 1990 (aged 28) | 0 | Chiefs / Taranaki |
| Jeffery Toomaga-Allen ^{1} | Prop | 19 November 1990 (aged 27) | 1 | Hurricanes / Wellington |
| Karl Tu’inukuafe | Prop | 21 February 1993 (aged 25) | 3 | Chiefs / North Harbour |
| Ofa Tu'ungafasi | Prop | 19 April 1992 (aged 26) | 17 | Blues / Auckland |
| Scott Barrett | Lock | 20 November 1993 (aged 24) | 19 | Crusaders / Taranaki |
| Brodie Retallick | Lock | 31 May 1991 (aged 27) | 68 | Chiefs / Hawke's Bay |
| Patrick Tuipulotu ^{3} | Lock | 23 January 1993 (age 33) | 16 | Blues / Auckland |
| Sam Whitelock | Lock | 12 October 1988 (aged 29) | 99 | Crusaders / Canterbury |
| Sam Cane | Flanker | 13 January 1992 (aged 26) | 55 | Chiefs / Bay of Plenty |
| Shannon Frizell | Flanker | 11 February 1994 (aged 24) | 1 | Highlanders / Tasman |
| Jackson Hemopo | Flanker | 14 November 1993 (aged 24) | 1 | Highlanders / Manawatu |
| Ardie Savea | Flanker | 14 October 1993 (aged 24) | 25 | Hurricanes / Wellington |
| Liam Squire | Flanker | 20 March 1991 (aged 27) | 17 | Highlanders / Tasman |
| Kieran Read (c) | Number 8 | 26 October 1985 (aged 32) | 109 | Crusaders / Counties Manukau |
| Luke Whitelock | Number 8 | 29 January 1991 (aged 27) | 5 | Highlanders / Canterbury |
| TJ Perenara | Half-back | 23 January 1992 (aged 26) | 45 | Hurricanes / Wellington |
| Aaron Smith | Half-back | 21 November 1988 (aged 29) | 74 | Highlanders / Manawatu |
| Te Toiroa Tahuriorangi | Half-back | 31 March 1995 (aged 23) | 0 | Chiefs / Taranaki |
| Beauden Barrett | First five-eighth | 27 May 1991 (aged 27) | 64 | Hurricanes / Taranaki |
| Damian McKenzie | First five-eighth | 25 April 1995 (aged 23) | 15 | Chiefs / Waikato |
| Richie Mo'unga | First five-eighth | 25 May 1994 (aged 24) | 1 | Crusaders / Canterbury |
| Ryan Crotty | Centre | 23 September 1988 (aged 29) | 37 | Crusaders / Canterbury |
| Jack Goodhue | Centre | 13 July 1995 (aged 23) | 1 | Crusaders / Northland |
| Ngani Laumape | Centre | 22 April 1993 (aged 25) | 6 | Hurricanes / Manawatu |
| Anton Lienert-Brown | Centre | 15 April 1995 (aged 23) | 24 | Chiefs / Waikato |
| Sonny Bill Williams | Centre | 3 August 1985 (aged 33) | 47 | Blues / Counties Manukau |
| Rieko Ioane | Wing | 18 March 1997 (aged 21) | 16 | Blues / Auckland |
| Nehe Milner-Skudder | Wing | 15 December 1990 (aged 27) | 11 | Hurricanes / Manawatu |
| Waisake Naholo | Wing | 8 May 1991 (aged 27) | 19 | Highlanders / Taranaki |
| Jordie Barrett | Fullback | 17 February 1997 (aged 21) | 5 | Hurricanes / Taranaki |
| Ben Smith | Fullback | 1 June 1986 (aged 32) | 67 | Highlanders / Otago |

=== South Africa ===
On 26 May 2018, head coach Rassie Erasmus named the following 35-man squad for South Africa's Rugby Championship campaign:

Cyle Brink withdrew from the squad on 16 August 2018 after sustaining a knee injury in training. He was not replaced.

^{1} On 31 August, Schalk Brits, Damian de Allende and Cheslin Kolbe were added to the squad ahead of the Australasian leg of the Championship in rounds 3 and 4.

^{2} On 23 September, Vincent Koch, Ruhan Nel and S'busiso Nkosi were added to the squad ahead of round 5 and 6.

| Player | Position | Date of birth (age) | Caps | Club/province |
|---|---|---|---|---|
| Schalk Brits ^{1} | Hooker | 16 May 1981 (aged 37) | 11 | Unattached |
| Malcolm Marx | Hooker | 13 July 1994 (aged 24) | 14 | (South Africa) Lions |
| Bongi Mbonambi | Hooker | 7 January 1991 (aged 27) | 16 | (South Africa) Stormers |
| Akker van der Merwe | Hooker | 17 June 1991 (aged 27) | 3 | (South Africa) Sharks |
| Thomas du Toit | Prop | 5 May 1995 (aged 23) | 4 | (South Africa) Sharks |
| Steven Kitshoff | Prop | 10 February 1992 (aged 26) | 27 | (South Africa) Stormers |
| Vincent Koch ^{2} | Prop | 13 March 1990 (aged 28) | 9 | (England) Saracens |
| Wilco Louw | Prop | 20 July 1994 (aged 24) | 7 | (South Africa) Stormers |
| Frans Malherbe | Prop | 14 March 1991 (aged 27) | 19 | (South Africa) Stormers |
| Tendai Mtawarira | Prop | 1 August 1985 (aged 33) | 101 | (South Africa) Sharks |
| Pieter-Steph du Toit | Lock | 20 August 1992 (aged 25) | 36 | (South Africa) Stormers |
| Eben Etzebeth | Lock | 29 October 1991 (aged 26) | 67 | (South Africa) Stormers |
| Franco Mostert | Lock | 27 November 1990 (aged 27) | 21 | (South Africa) Lions |
| Marvin Orie | Lock | 15 February 1993 (aged 25) | 1 | (South Africa) Lions |
| RG Snyman | Lock | 29 January 1995 (aged 23) | 3 | (South Africa) Bulls |
| Cyle Brink | Flanker | 16 January 1994 (aged 24) | 0 | (South Africa) Lions |
| Jean-Luc du Preez | Flanker | 5 August 1995 (aged 23) | 13 | (South Africa) Sharks |
| Siya Kolisi (c) | Flanker | 16 June 1991 (aged 27) | 31 | (South Africa) Stormers |
| Francois Louw | Flanker | 15 June 1985 (aged 33) | 57 | (England) Bath |
| Sikhumbuzo Notshe | Flanker | 28 May 1993 (aged 25) | 4 | (South Africa) Stormers |
| Marco van Staden | Flanker | 25 August 1995 (aged 22) | 0 | (South Africa) Bulls |
| Warren Whiteley | Number 8 | 18 September 1987 (aged 30) | 17 | (South Africa) Lions |
| Ross Cronjé | Scrum-half | 26 July 1989 (aged 29) | 10 | (South Africa) Lions |
| Faf de Klerk | Scrum-half | 19 October 1991 (aged 26) | 14 | (England) Sale Sharks |
| Embrose Papier | Scrum-half | 25 April 1997 (aged 21) | 2 | (South Africa) Bulls |
| Ivan van Zyl | Scrum-half | 30 June 1995 (aged 23) | 3 | (South Africa) Bulls |
| Elton Jantjies | Fly-half | 1 August 1990 (aged 28) | 26 | (South Africa) Lions |
| Handré Pollard | Fly-half | 11 March 1994 (aged 24) | 29 | (South Africa) Bulls |
| Damian Willemse | Fly-half | 7 May 1998 (aged 20) | 0 | (South Africa) Stormers |
| Lukhanyo Am | Centre | 28 November 1993 (aged 24) | 3 | (South Africa) Sharks |
| Damian de Allende ^{1} | Centre | 25 November 1991 (aged 26) | 30 | (South Africa) Western Province |
| André Esterhuizen | Centre | 30 March 1994 (aged 24) | 2 | (South Africa) Sharks |
| Jesse Kriel | Centre | 15 February 1994 (aged 24) | 32 | (South Africa) Bulls |
| Lionel Mapoe | Centre | 13 July 1988 (aged 30) | 12 | (South Africa) Lions |
| Ruhan Nel ^{2} | Centre | 17 May 1991 (aged 27) | 0 | (South Africa) Western Province |
| Aphiwe Dyantyi | Wing | 26 August 1994 (aged 23) | 3 | (South Africa) Lions |
| Makazole Mapimpi | Wing | 26 July 1990 (aged 28) | 1 | (South Africa) Sharks |
| Lwazi Mvovo | Wing | 3 June 1986 (aged 32) | 17 | (South Africa) Sharks |
| S'busiso Nkosi ^{2} | Wing | 21 January 1996 (aged 22) | 3 | (South Africa) Sharks |
| Cheslin Kolbe ^{1} | Fullback | 28 October 1993 (aged 24) | 0 | (France) Toulouse |
| Willie le Roux | Fullback | 18 August 1989 (aged 29) | 44 | (England) Wasps |

== See also ==
- History of rugby union matches between Argentina and Australia
- History of rugby union matches between Argentina and New Zealand
- History of rugby union matches between Argentina and South Africa
- History of rugby union matches between Australia and South Africa
- History of rugby union matches between Australia and New Zealand
- History of rugby union matches between New Zealand and South Africa
