= Angus Taʻavao =

NZ international rugby union player

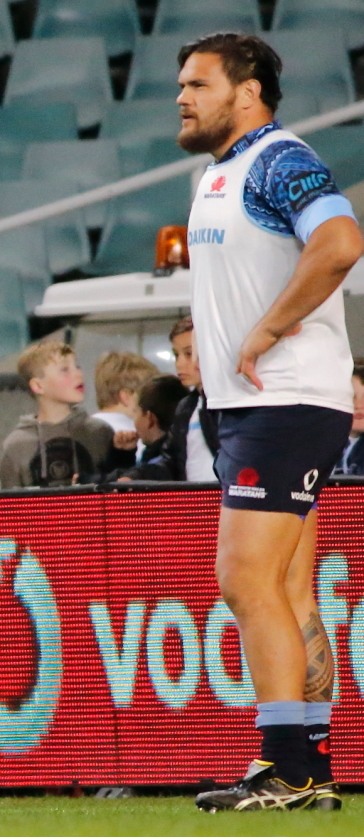
- Ta'avao in 2017
- Full name: Angus Wilkie Faiumiolemau Timaʻavao
- Born: 22 March 1990 (age 36) Auckland, New Zealand
- Height: 194 cm (6 ft 4 in)
- Weight: 124 kg (273 lb; 19 st 7 lb)
- School: Dilworth School

Rugby union career
- Position: Prop
- Current team: Auckland, Blues
Senior career
Years	Team	Apps	(Points)
2010–	Auckland	49	(15)
2012–2015	Blues	49	(10)
2014–2018	Taranaki	34	(5)
2016–2017	Waratahs	22	(15)
2016–2017	Northern Suburbs	12	(12)
2016	Sydney Rays	5	(0)
2018–2023	Chiefs	62	(25)
2023–2025	Blues	25	(15)
2026-	Highlanders	12	(10)
- Correct as of 13 March 2026
International career
Years	Team	Apps	(Points)
2010	New Zealand U20	4	(0)
2014	Barbarian F.C.	2	(0)
2018–	New Zealand	22	(15)
2020	North Island	1	(0)
- Correct as of 13 March 2026

Angus Wilkie Faiumiolemau Taʻavao (born 22 March 1990) is a New Zealand-born rugby union player, currently playing as a prop for the Highlanders in Super Rugby and Auckland in the Mitre 10 Cup. Taʻavao was called into New Zealand's international team, the All Blacks, as injury cover in 2018 and has played 22 tests since his international debut. Taʻavao was a member of New Zealand's squad in the 2019 Rugby World Cup.

Taʻavao has previously represented the Chiefs and the Blues in Super Rugby, and Taranaki in the NPC. New Zealand's domestic rugby competition, as well as Northern Suburbs, Sydney and the Waratahs in Australia.

== Early life ==
Although born in New Zealand, Taʻavao would also have been eligible to play international rugby for Australia through his mother, or for Samoa through his father.

Taʻavao was schooled at Dilworth School in Auckland, New Zealand.

== Career ==
=== Early career ===
Taʻavao was selected for the New Zealand U20 side for the 2010 tournament in Argentina, where he captained the side in his first match. He made his Auckland debut in the same year.

Taʻavao was a member of the Blues wider training group in 2011. He was a member of the full Blues squad from the 2012 until the 2015.

=== 2016–2018 ===
Taʻavao signed a two-year contract for the Waratahs and Sydney Rays for 2016 through 2017. Taʻavao signed for the Chiefs for the 2018 Super Rugby season and became a regular starter for them early in the season, with established All Blacks Nepo Laulala and Atunaisa Moli ruled out with serious injuries. Taʻavao was one of the best-performing players in the Chiefs during 2018 and was called into the All Blacks, as injury cover for Crusaders prop, Joe Moody.

Taʻavao made his international debut for New Zealand on 29 September 2018, during the fifth round of the 2018 Rugby Championship, against Argentina's Los Pumas, at Buenos Aires. Taʻavao replaced Blues prop, Ofa Tuʻungafasi, off the bench in the 51st minute and had a good impact off the bench, contributing towards a highly dominant scrum. The All Blacks beat Los Pumas 35–17, winning the Rugby Championship in the process. Taʻavao then made two more appearances for New Zealand on their end-of-season tour, including a start in a 69–31 win over Japan.

=== 2019 ===
With Tim Perry not considered for selection due to injury, Taʻavao was named in New Zealand's squad for the 2019 Rugby Championship. After a start against Argentina and appearing as a substitute against South Africa, as well as the record 26–47 defeat to Australia, Taʻavao established himself as a regular replacement off the bench for New Zealand, alongside Auckland teammate, Ofa Tuʻungafasi.

On 28 August, All Blacks Head Coach, Steve Hansen named Taʻavao as one of 31 players in New Zealand's squad for the 2019 Rugby World Cup. With 108-test veteran, Owen Franks missing out on the squad entirely, Taʻavao's selection received widespread news coverage. Franks claimed that Taʻavao, as well as Nepo Laulala, "deserve their places in the World Cup squad".

Taʻavao played in all of New Zealand's tests during the competition, starting in a 63–0 victory over Canada, also scoring his first try for New Zealand in a 71–9 win over Namibia. Having proved himself as a star performer for the All Blacks, Taʻavao also came off the bench in all three knockout tests of the World Cup, with New Zealand beating Wales 40–17 in the Bronze Final, claiming third place.

== Honours ==
New Zealand

- Rugby World Cup / Webb Ellis Cup
  - Third-place: 2019

Blues

- Super Rugby Pacific Champions
  - 2024

Taranaki

- ITM Cup Champions
  - 2014
