= Pablo Matera =

Argentine rugby union player

- Matera with Argentina in 2021
- Full name: Pablo Nicolás Matera
- Born: 18 July 1993 (age 33) Buenos Aires, Argentina
- Height: 1.92 m (6 ft 4 in)
- Weight: 111 kg (245 lb; 17 st 7 lb)
- School: St. Catherine's Moorlands School

Rugby union career
- Position(s): Flanker, Number 8
- Current team: Honda Heat
Senior career
Years	Team	Apps	(Points)
2012–2013	Alumni	3	(5)
2013–2015	Pampas XV	3	(5)
2013–2014	Leicester Tigers	8	(10)
2016–2019	Jaguares	52	(55)
2019–2021	Stade Français	25	(10)
2022	Crusaders	14	(5)
2022–	Honda Heat	49	(85)
- Correct as of 22 March 2025
International career
Years	Team	Apps	(Points)
2012–2013	Argentina U20	10	(20)
2013–	Argentina	116	(60)
- Correct as of 22 November 2024
National sevens team
Years	Team		Comps
2012	Argentina		2
- Correct as of 28 August 2013

Pablo Nicolás Matera (born 18 July 1993) is an Argentine professional rugby union player who plays as a flanker for Japan Rugby League One club Mie Honda Heat and the Argentina national team. He became Argentina's most capped player ever in 2025.

Previously, he played for Stade Français of the Top 14 League, the Leicester Tigers in England, the Pampas XV in the South African Vodacom Cup, and the Jaguares of Super Rugby. Matera has been a regular starter for Argentina since his debut in 2013, having played over 115 Tests for his national team.

== Club career ==
In October 2013, five months after his international debut, English Premiership side Leicester Tigers signed 20-year-old Matera until the end of the 2013–14 season. He initially signed as an injury replacement for Tom Croft. Matera scored his first try for the club in round 16 of the 2013–14 season against the Newcastle Falcons in an 18–41 victory at Kingston Park, Newcastle.

Matera signed for the Jaguares Argentina players, ahead of the 2016 Super Rugby season, after their inclusion in the competition. Matera received a yellow card thirty three minutes into the game against the Sharks at Kings Park Stadium in Durban. Matera scored his first and only try of the season in their fifth home game in round 15 against the Bulls, a 29–11 victory at the José Amalfitani Stadium in Buenos Aires.

Matera scored his first and only try for the Jaguares in the 2017 season against the Waratahs in a 27–40 away win at Allianz Stadium in Sydney.

Matera was named as captain of the Jaguares ahead of the 2018 season.

Matera joined Stade in 2019.

== International career ==
Matera represented Argentina U20 in the 2012 and 2013 U20 World Championships.

Matera made his senior debut for Los Pumas against Chile in May 2013 and was subsequently named in the squad for the 2013 Rugby Championship, where he featured in all the games of that campaign. Matera was a big feature for Argentina in the 2015 Rugby World Cup, playing six of seven games for Los Pumas and helping them finish fourth overall.

Matera played his 50th test for Los Pumas on 18 August 2018 against South Africa during round one on the 2018 Rugby Championship. The test was a 21–34 loss for Los Pumas, who bounced back to beat South Africa the following week. Despite Matera's good performances against South Africa, new head coach Mario Ledesma went on to bench Matera for the 8 September clash against New Zealand.

Matera was the Captain of the Argentina national team, which on 14 November 2020 had their first ever win against the All Blacks.

On 30 November 2020, Matera was temporarily stripped of his captaincy and suspended from the national team.

Matera became the most capped Argentina player of all time in 2025 Argentina national rugby union team#Player records (career).

== Personal life ==
=== Controversies ===
In November 2020, Los Pumas were criticised for not properly honouring the death of Diego Maradona in the game against the All Blacks, three days after his death. In the following days, several Twitter users found and shared racist messages published by Matera in his account. Matera's Twitter posts were made between seven and nine years earlier, when he was a teenager. Tweets include: "20 October 2011 - Hatred of Bolivians and Paraguayans etc is born from that maid who once lost a hair in your food. 5 March 2012- The fat woman is staring at me hahaha poor fat woman I am not giving up my seat, that's not pregnancy. that doesn't count. 24 April 2012- Bolivian man carries mp3 with ipod headphones. Sufficient evidence to imprison him for theft and loss of it 3 May 2012- Nice morning to go out in the car and run over blacks 30 May 2012- South Africa baby! I'm finally leaving this country full of blacks. OUCH!! In response, Matera deleted his social media account, but the Argentine Rugby Union's punishment was light and questionable in sincerity. He has since publicly apologized.

Both the Delegación de Asociaciones Israelitas Argentinas (DAIA) and the National Institute Against Discrimination, Xenophobia and Racism (INADI) heavily condemned Matera’s tweets.

== Career statistics ==
=== List of international tries ===
As of 9 August 2022

Try	Opposing team	Location	Venue	Competition	Date	Result	Score
1	Chile	Montevideo, Uruguay	Estadio Charrua	2013 South American Rugby Championship "A"	1 May 2013	Win	85 – 10
2	Brazil	Montevideo, Uruguay	Estadio Charrua	2013 South American Rugby Championship "A"	4 May 2013	Win	83 – 10
3	England	Santa Fe, Argentina	Estadio Brigadier Estanislao López	2017 June rugby union tests	17 June 2017	Loss	25 – 35
4	South Africa	Durban, South Africa	Kings Park Stadium	2018 Rugby Championship	18 August 2018	Loss	34 – 21
5	Australia	Salta, Argentina	Estadio Padre Ernesto Martearena	2018 Rugby Championship	6 October 2018	Loss	34 – 45
6	South Africa	Pretoria, South Africa	Loftus Versfeld Stadium	2019 Rugby World Cup warm-up matches	17 August 2019	Loss	24 – 18
7	Wales	Cardiff, Wales	Millennium Stadium	2021 July rugby union tests	10 July 2021	Draw	20 – 20
8	Wales	Cardiff, Wales	Millennium Stadium	2021 July rugby union tests	17 July 2021	Win	11 – 33
9	South Africa	Port Elizabeth, South Africa	Nelson Mandela Bay Stadium	2021 Rugby Championship	21 August 2021	Loss	29 – 10
10	Australia	Mendoza, Argentina	Estadio Malvinas Argentinas	2022 Rugby Championship	6 August 2022	Loss	26 – 41

=== Club summary ===
Season	Team	Games	Starts	Sub	Mins	Tries	Cons	Pens	Drops	Points	Yel	Red
2016	Jaguares	11	10	1	748	1	0	0	0	5	2	0
2017	Jaguares	11	11	1	775	1	0	0	0	5	1	0
2018	Jaguares	5	5	0	386	0	0	0	0	0	0	0
Total		27	26	2	1,909	2	0	0	0	10	3	0
