= Warren Whiteley =

South Africa international rugby union player

- Full name: Warren Roger Whiteley
- Born: 18 September 1987 (age 39) Durban, South Africa
- Height: 1.93 m (6 ft 4 in)
- Weight: 110 kg (17 st 5 lb; 240 lb)
- School: Glenwood High School
- University: North-West University

Rugby union career
- Position: Number eight
- Current team: Lions / Golden Lions / Golden Lions XV
Senior career
| Years | Team | Apps | (Points) |
| 2008–2009 | Sharks XV | 13 | (20) |
| 2009 | Mighty Elephants | 5 | (5) |
| 2010–2018 | Golden Lions XV | 12 | (20) |
| 2010–2018 | Golden Lions | 53 | (40) |
| 2011–2019 | Lions | 94 | (75) |
| 2016–2018 | Red Hurricanes | 4 | (0) |
- Correct as of 8 September 2019
International career
| Years | Team | Apps | (Points) |
| 2012–2014 | South Africa Sevens | | |
| 2014–2018 | South Africa | 23 | (15) |
| 2015 | Springboks | 1 | (0) |
- Correct as of 13 November 2018
Medal record
Representing South Africa
Men's Rugby sevens
Commonwealth Games
| Gold medal – first place | 2014 Glasgow | Team |

Warren Roger Whiteley (born 18 September 1987) is a South African former professional rugby union player for the Lions in Super Rugby, the Golden Lions in the Currie Cup and the Golden Lions XV in the Rugby Challenge. His regular playing position was eighthman. He has previously played for the Sharks and the Blitzbokke.

Whiteley has been the captain of the Lions in Super Rugby since 2014, when the team was re-introduced to the competition. The team has reached two finals in 2016 and 2017, which were losses against the Hurricanes and Crusaders respectively, since Whiteley was named captain.

In 2016, Whiteley became a regular starter for the Sprinboks following an injury to regular number 8 Duane Vermeulen in the second test against Ireland. Following Vermeulen's injury, Whiteley played the full 80 minutes of every game for the rest of the year, with the exception of the Barbarians fixture on 5 November, which Whiteley did not play in. Whiteley also scored three tries that year, crossing over the line against Argentina, Australia and Ireland,

Whiteley was named the new 58th captain of the Springboks in 2017, following Adriaan Strauss' retirement from international rugby. Whiteley was ruled out of the final mid-year test against France due to injury, however, being replaced as captain by Stormers lock Eben Etzebeth. Whiteley missed the Super Rugby playoffs due to injury, with Jaco Kriel taking over as captain of the Lions. He went on to miss the entirety of the remaining 2017 season.

He returned in the opening match of the 2018 Super Rugby tournament for the Lions against the Sharks. However, he sustained an injury against the Blues and missed the majority of the Super Rugby season as well as the mid-year internationals, a match against Wales and a three-match series against England. Siya Kolisi took over captaincy in the absence of Whiteley and Etzebeth and kept his captaincy beyond the return of the two players.

Whiteley would go on to lead the Lions to the final of the 2018 Super Rugby tournament, a 37–18 loss to the Crusaders, the third consecutive time that the Lions were runners-up in the tournament. Whiteley started every game for South Africa in the 2018 Rugby Championship, including a 34–36 victory against New Zealand at Westpac Stadium. The Springboks came in second in the championship.
