= Tim Perry (rugby union) =

NZ international rugby union player

- Full name: Timothy Grant Perry
- Born: 1 August 1988 (age 38) Ashburton, New Zealand
- Height: 191 cm (6 ft 3 in)
- Weight: 119 kg (262 lb; 18 st 10 lb)
- School: St. Andrew's College
- Notable relative: Grant Perry (father)

Rugby union career
- Position: Prop
Senior career
Years	Team	Apps	(Points)
2010	Mid Canterbury	10	(10)
2012–2019	Tasman	70	(25)
2013	Blues	7	(0)
2014–2018	Crusaders	24	(5)
- Correct as of 27 October 2019
International career
Years	Team	Apps	(Points)
2010	New Zealand Heartland XV	3	(0)
2017–2018	New Zealand	8	(0)
- Correct as of 13 April 2019

Timothy Grant Perry (born 1 August 1988) is a retired New Zealand rugby union player who played as a prop for Tasman in New Zealand's domestic Mitre 10 Cup, the Crusaders and the Blues in the international Super Rugby competition.

Despite many injuries across his career, Perry was selected for New Zealand in 2017, playing 8 games for the All Blacks.

== Early career ==
The son of former All Black Grant Perry, Tim was born in the town of Ashburton and raised on a nearby farm. He moved to Christchurch to complete his secondary school education, where he was a boarder at St. Andrew's College. He played first XV rugby for St. Andrew's and after graduation won the Christchurch Colts competition, playing for the Christchurch club and represented Canterbury at under-19 level in 2007.

His breakthrough into top level rugby was delayed due to a focus on other commitments, notably his job as a shepherd on his family's farm, however he began to make a name for himself playing for Mid Canterbury in the 2010 Heartland Championship. He was nominated for the Heartland player of the year award and made the team of the season.

For 2011 he moved to Marlborough to play club rugby for Harlequins and as a result of his good form, he gained selection for Tasman's B side.

== Senior career ==
Perry made the Tasman ITM Cup squad for the first time in 2012 and instantly became a regular in the number 1 jersey, playing 9 of the Makos 11 games as they were knocked out in the Championship semi-finals by Otago. He started 11 times and scored a career high 2 tries during Tasman's Championship title winning year of 2013 which culminated in a narrow 26–25 victory over Hawke's Bay in the final.

Tasman continued their meteoric rise in 2014, reaching the Premiership final in their first season after promotion before going down 36–32 to Taranaki in the final with Perry making 8 starts throughout the year. 2015 saw the Makos knocked out in the semi-finals, this time by Auckland with Perry again a key component of their scrum, playing 9 of their 11 games during the season while in 2016 the men from Marlborough and Nelson were again beaten finalists, losing out 43–27 to perennial champions Canterbury with Perry an ever present throughout the campaign.

Perry was part of the Tasman team that won the Mitre 10 Cup for the first time unbeaten in 2019 playing his 70th and final game for the Mako in the final.

== Super Rugby ==
A strong first season at provincial level with Tasman saw Perry named in the Blues squad for the 2013 Super Rugby season. He started 7 games in what was to be his only year in Auckland as his franchise endured a difficult season, winning only 6 of 16 games to finish 10th on the overall log.

He headed to the Crusaders for 2014 and despite stiff competition from fellow looseheads; Wyatt Crockett and Joe Moody, he acquitted himself well. Helped by an injury to Moody, Perry went on to play 10 times in his first season in Christchurch, 4 times from the start as the men in red and black reached the tournament final before losing 33–32 to the Waratahs in Sydney.

Moody's return from injury in 2015 in addition to the emergence of wider training group loosehead Alex Hodgman relegated Perry down to fourth choice number 1 and as a result, he only made a solitary substitute appearance during the campaign. However, he was still highly thought of in Crusaders' country and was included in the franchise's wider training group for 2016 despite having suffered a season-ending injury playing for the Tasman Makos in 2015. After missing out on 2016, new Crusaders head coach, Scott Robertson promoted Perry back to the 'Saders senior squad for 2017.

== International ==
Perry was a New Zealand Schools representative in 2006.

Despite limited game time for the Crusaders in 2017 due to established All Blacks Joe Moody and Wyatt Crockett being regulars in the 1 and 17 jerseys, Perry was called up to the All Blacks for the 2017 end-of-year tour after an outstanding provincial campaign with Tasman and injuries to Moody and Kane Hames. Perry made his debut off the bench, replacing the now-recovered Hames in the match against the Barbarians in Twickenham on 4 November 2017, which was a 31–22 win. Perry is the 20th All Black to be a son of a former All Black. Perry also started for the All Blacks 10 days later, playing a solid shift in the 28–23 win against a French XV before being replaced by debutant Atunaisa Moli, however both of these matches do not count as official test matches.

Perry was included in the All Blacks squad for the France test series, but he failed to make his official test debut due to a hamstring injury. Perry was replaced in the squad, by fellow newcomer Karl Tu’inukuafe, as the All Blacks won the series 3–0.

Perry recovered from injury in time for the Super Rugby playoffs, in good form. This form from Super Rugby allowed Perry to play his first test for New Zealand on 18 August 2018 against Australia, during the 2018 Rugby Championship. Perry replaced Crusaders team-mate Joe Moody in the 53rd minute of the test and had a fine performance against Australia, who were beaten by the All Blacks by 38–13.

Perry made a further four test appearances during the Rugby Championship, in the injured Moody's absence. Perry replaced Karl Tu'inukuafe off the bench in all of them. Perry's highlight of the competition was on 29 September, against Argentina, where he and All Black debutant Angus Ta'avao performed extremely well against the opposition's scrum. Perry's outstanding scrum performance led to a 35–17 win over Argentina, securing the Rugby Championship trophy for New Zealand.

In the final round of the Rugby Championship, Perry didn't perform as well. Perry replaced Karl Tu'inukuafe against South Africa's Springboks, in the 46th minute but missed a crucial tackle on Springbok captain Siya Kolisi, only a few minutes after coming on, leading to a try for South African midfielder Damian de Allende. Perry was eventually subbed off the field in the 70th minute, for a concussion test, which was failed. Tu'inukuafe came back onto the field for Perry, who missed out on the final minute, when Perry's Crusaders team-mate Richie Mo'unga kicked the winning conversion, leading to a narrow 32–30 win.

Having broken his arm during the 2019 Super Rugby season, Perry was not considered for national selection due to injury in 2019, missing out on the World Cup.

== Career honours ==
Tasman

- ITM Cup Championship – 2013
- Mitre 10 Cup Premiership – 2019

Crusaders

- Super Rugby – 2017
- Super Rugby – 2018
