= Grant Perry =

- Born: Richard Grant Perry; 26 May 1953 (age 73) Christchurch, New Zealand
- Height: 1.83 m (6 ft 0 in)
- Weight: 91 kg (201 lb)
- School: St Andrews College
- Notable relative: Tim Perry (son)

Rugby union career
- Position: Hooker
Provincial / State sides
Years	Team	Apps	(Points)
1975–84	Mid Canterbury	116	
International career
Years	Team	Apps	(Points)
1980	New Zealand	0	(0)

Richard Grant Perry (born 26 May 1953) is a former New Zealand rugby union player. He was educated at St. Andrew's College. He initially began his rugby union career as a loose forward but switched to hooker, Perry represented Mid Canterbury at a provincial level where he captained the team from 1977. He was called into the New Zealand national side, the All Blacks, as a replacement on the 1980 tour of Fiji. He played a single match, against Nadroga at Lautoka.

His brother, Bruce, represented Mid Canterbury between 1976 and 1977. His son Tim Perry made his All Blacks debut against the Barbarians on 4 November in a 31–22 win and became All Black #1162, becoming the 20th All Black whose father played for the team.
