= Faf de Klerk =

South African rugby union player

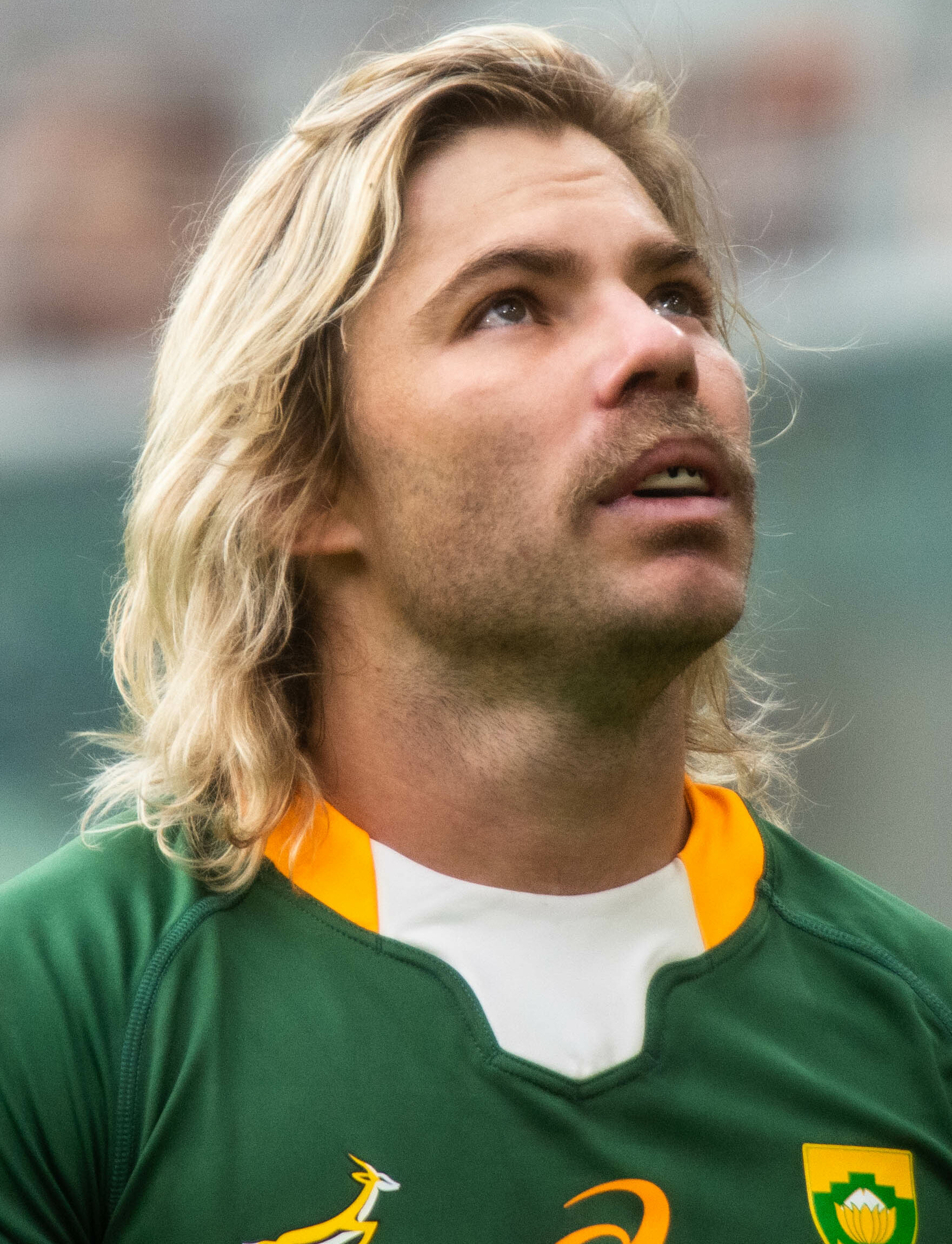
- de Klerk playing for South Africa in 2022
- Full name: François de Klerk
- Born: 19 October 1991 (age 35) Nelspruit, Transvaal (now Mpumalanga), South Africa
- Height: 1.72 m (5 ft 8 in)
- Weight: 88 kg (194 lb)
- School: Hoërskool Waterkloof

Rugby union career
- Position(s): Scrum-half, Fly-half
- Current team: Cheetahs
Youth career
- 2007–2009: Blue Bulls
- 2010–2011: Golden Lions
Senior career
Years	Team	Apps	(Points)
2012–2015	Pumas	56	(20)
2014–2017	Lions	65	(72)
2016	Golden Lions	1	(0)
2017	Golden Lions XV	2	(0)
2017–2021	Sale Sharks	103	(241)
2022–2026	Canon Eagles	42	(54)
2026–	Cheetahs	1	(0)
- Correct as of 18 October 2026
International career
Years	Team	Apps	(Points)
2016–	South Africa	60	(50)
- Correct as of 19 July 2025
Medal record
Men's Rugby union
Representing South Africa
Rugby World Cup
Gold medal – first place	2019 Japan	Squad
Gold medal – first place	2023 France	Squad
The Rugby Championship
Gold medal – first place	2019 Rugby Championship	Squad

François de Klerk (born 19 October 1991), known by his nickname Faf, is a South African professional rugby union player who plays scrum-half for the Cheetahs and the South Africa national team. He was a member of the South Africa teams that won the Rugby World Cup in 2019 and 2023.

== Personal life and education ==
Born in Nelspruit (now Mbombela), de Klerk played rugby at Hoërskool Waterkloof in Pretoria.

Faf de Klerk is married to Miné de Klerk (née van Niekerk). The couple, who married in 2022, welcomed their second daughter, Yuke, in November 2025. They also have an older daughter named Remi-Ré.

== Career ==
De Klerk was included in the Lions squad for the 2014 Super Rugby season and made his debut in a 21–20 victory over the Cheetahs in Bloemfontein.

He joined the Golden Lions Currie Cup team for the 2016 season.

He joined English Premiership side Sale Sharks prior to the 2017–18 season on a three-year contract. In December 2018, the club announced that De Klerk signed a contract extension until 2023.

After four seasons with the Sharks, de Klerk announced in June 2022 that he would be departing the club at the end of the 2021–22 season to join Yokohama Canon Eagles in Japan Rugby League One.

== International career ==
De Klerk was rewarded for his Super Rugby form when he was selected by the then recently appointed Springbok coach Allister Coetzee in South Africa's 31-man squad for their 2016 three-test match series against Ireland and made his test debut as the starting scrum-half in the opening test at Newlands Stadium. In a tightly-fought series, Ireland won the first test 26–20, but the Springboks fought back to clinch the series, winning 32–26 in Johannesburg and 19–13 in Port Elizabeth.

After signing for Sale Sharks in 2017, De Klerk was ineligible to represent the Springboks due to having fewer than 30 caps. However, after this selection criterion was abolished in 2018, new Springbok coach Rassie Erasmus recalled De Klerk to the team for the 2018 three-test match series against England.

He was a member of South Africa's victorious 2019 Rugby Championship campaign and was duly selected for the 2019 Rugby World Cup. In their 20 October quarter-final match against Japan, he was named Player of the Match. He was a key player for South Africa's World Cup victory, being named as the starting scrum-half in two of their pool matches, as well as all their play-off games. He scored a try in their quarter-final win over Japan. De Klerk was once again included as the starting scrum-half against England in the 2019 Rugby World Cup Final, which saw South Africa beating England 32–12 to secure a third Webb Ellis Cup lift.

== International statistics ==
=== Test Match record ===
As of 19 July 2025

Against	P	W	D	L	Tri	Pts	%Won
Argentina	9	7	0	2	1	5	77.78
Australia	6	1	0	5	1	5	16.67
British & Irish Lions	2	1	0	1	1	5	50
England	7	5	0	2	1	16	71.43
France	3	2	0	1	0	5	66.67
Georgia	1	1	0	0	0	0	100
Ireland	7	3	0	4	0	0	42.86
Italy	4	3	0	1	0	0	75
Japan	2	2	0	0	1	5	100
New Zealand	12	5	1	6	0	3	41.67
Romania	1	1	0	0	0	4	100
Scotland	1	1	0	0	0	2	100
Wales	5	4	0	1	0	0	80
Total	60	36	1	23	5	50	60

Pld = Games Played, W = Games Won, D = Games Drawn, L = Games Lost, Tri = Tries Scored, Pts = Points Scored

=== International tries ===
As of 25 May 2025

Try	Opposing team	Location	Venue	Competition	Date	Result	Score
1	England	Johannesburg, South Africa	Ellis Park Stadium	2018 England tour of South Africa	9 June 2018	Win	42–39
2	Argentina	Durban, South Africa	Kings Park Stadium	2018 Rugby Championship	18 August 2018	Win	34–21
3	Australia	Port Elizabeth, South Africa	Nelson Mandela Bay Stadium	2018 Rugby Championship	29 September 2018	Win	23–12
4	Japan	Chōfu, Japan	Tokyo Stadium	2019 Rugby World Cup quarter-finals	20 October 2019	Win	3–26
5	British & Irish Lions	Cape Town, South Africa	Cape Town Stadium	2021 British & Irish Lions tour	24 July 2021	Loss	17–22
