= Bautista Delguy =

Argentine rugby union player

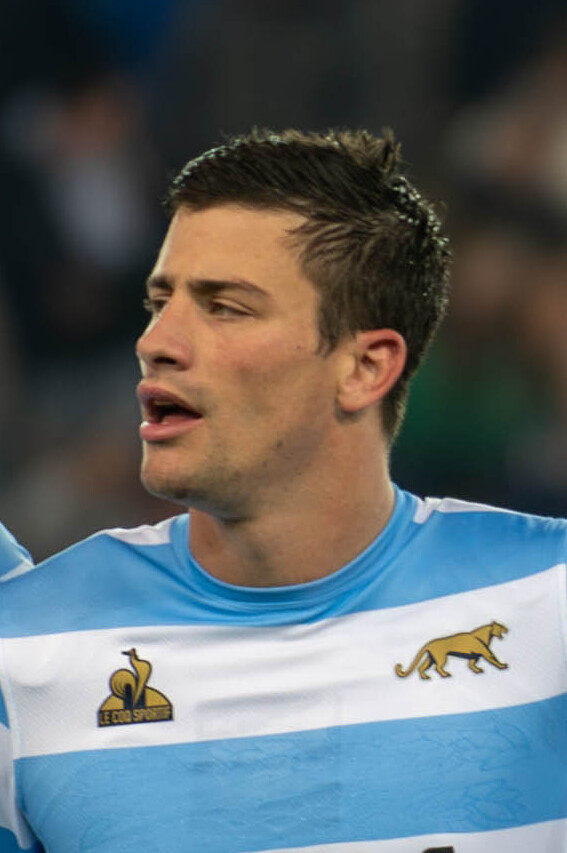
- Born: 22 April 1997 (age 29) Remedios de Escalada, Buenos Aires, Argentina
- Height: 6 ft 0 in (1.83 m)
- Weight: 179 lb (81 kg; 12 st 11 lb)

Rugby union career
- Position: Wing
Amateur team(s)
Years	Team	Apps	(Points)
2016–2017	Pucará	23	(68)
Senior career
Years	Team	Apps	(Points)
2019	Jaguares XV	3	(20)
2020–21	Bordeaux	2	(10)
2021-22	USA Perpignan	14	(25)
2022-	ASM Clermont Auvergne	64	(127)
- Correct as of 15 February 2026
Super Rugby
Years	Team	Apps	(Points)
2018–2020	Jaguares	22	(60)
- Correct as of 3 January 2018
International career
Years	Team	Apps	(Points)
2016–2017	Argentina XV	10	(40)
2016–2017	Argentina U20	9	(15)
2018–	Argentina	36	(40)
- Correct as of 19 November 2022
National sevens team
Years	Team		Comps
2016	Argentina		6

Bautista Delguy (born 22 April 1997) is an Argentine rugby union player who plays for the Argentina national team and ASM Clermont Auvergne in the French Top 14. His playing position is Wing.

Delguy's professional debut came against the Lions at Ellis Park Stadium whilst playing for the Jaguares in the Super Rugby, February 2018.

Delguy was a starter for the Argentina national team on 14 November 2020 in their first ever win against the All Blacks.

== Career ==
=== Bordeaux ===
In late 2020, Delguy signed for Top 14 side, Bordeaux after the abandonment of the Super Rugby competition following the COVID-19 pandemic.

=== Perpignan ===
Delguy now plays for ASM Clermont Auvergne in France's Top 14 competition.
