= Marco Ciccioli =

- Born: 6 November 1995 (age 31) Bahía Blanca, Argentina
- Height: 1.90 m (6 ft 3 in)
- Weight: 123 kg (19.4 st; 271 lb)

Rugby union career
- Position: Prop
- Current team: Rovigo Delta
Youth career
- CASI
Senior career
Years	Team	Apps	(Points)
2015−2018	CASI	29	(10)
2019	Zebre	3	(0)
2019−2020	CASI	11	(0)
2021−2022	Nîmes	25	(0)
2022	Rovigo Delta		
- Correct as of 16 Oct 2022
International career
Years	Team	Apps	(Points)
2018−2019	Argentina XV	7	(0)
- Correct as of 16 Oct 2022

Marco Ciccioli (born 6 November 1995) is an Argentine rugby union player, currently playing for Italian United Rugby Championship side Rovigo Delta. His preferred position is Prop.

In March 2019, Ciccioli a short contract with Italian Pro14 team Zebre.

In 2018 and 2019, Ciccioli was named in the Argentina XV squad.
