= Aphiwe Dyantyi =

South African professional rugby union player

- Full name: Aphiwe Odwa Dyantyi
- Born: 26 August 1994 (age 32) Ngcobo, Eastern Cape, South Africa
- Height: 1.82 m (5 ft 11 1/2 in)
- Weight: 87 kg (192 lb; 13 st 10 lb)
- School: Dale College Boys' High School
- University: University of Johannesburg

Rugby union career
- Position: Winger / Centre
- Current team: Bulls / Blue Bulls
Youth career
- 2007: Border Bulldogs
- 2015: Golden Lions
Senior career
Years	Team	Apps	(Points)
2016–2018	Golden Lions XV	3	(10)
2017–2018	Golden Lions	14	(30)
2018–2019	Lions	29	(65)
2023–2024	Sharks	9	(0)
2024–	Blue Bulls	3	(0)
2024–	Bulls	4	(0)
- Correct as of 8 August 2024
International career
Years	Team	Apps	(Points)
2018–2019	South Africa	13	(30)
- Correct as of 21 July 2019

Aphiwe Odwa Dyantyi (born 26 August 1994) is a South African professional rugby union player for the Blue Bulls who play in the United Rugby Championship, the EPCR Challenge Cup. His regular position is wing.

== Rugby career ==
=== Schools rugby (2007–2012) ===
Born in the small Eastern Cape town of Ngcobo, Dyantyi represented the Border Bulldogs as a fly-half at the 2007 Under-13 Craven Week tournament held in Krugersdorp. However, he missed out on provincial selection at high school level and did not even play for the Dale College Boys' High School first XV after being deemed too small.

=== University and youth rugby (2013–2015) ===
After school, Dyantyi enrolled at the University of Johannesburg to study a B.Com. in marketing and he mainly played soccer, but returned to rugby after friends invited him to play in UJ's internal koshuis (residency) league. He represented UJ in the Young Guns competition in 2014, as well as playing some rugby sevens for the university. In 2015, he played for the UJ senior team in the Varsity Cup — scoring a try in the competition which led to a 46–10 victory over the CUT Ixias — and linked up with the Under-21 side of the Golden Lions, scoring four tries in the Under-21 Provincial Championship as the team reached the semifinals of the competition.

=== Golden Lions and UJ (2016–2017) ===
After further appearances for UJ in the 2016 Varsity Cup — scoring a further four tries as his team reached the semifinals — Dyantyi signed his first professional contract with the Golden Lions, and made his first class debut for the Golden Lions XV side in their final match of the Currie Cup qualification series against the Boland Cavaliers in Grabouw.

Dyantyi again represented UJ in the Varsity Cup in 2017 before making one more first class appearance for the Golden Lions XV in the newly created Rugby Challenge competition, scoring his first points at this level by scoring two tries in their 35–25 victory over the Pumas in Johannesburg. He was included in the Golden Lions squad for the 2017 Currie Cup Premier Division, and he made his debut in that competition by starting in their Round One match against the Pumas. In addition to making his Currie Cup debut, Dyantyi also scored his first Currie Cup try in a 36–43 defeat. He scored another try in their next match against Griquas, and followed that up with a double the following week against trans-Jukskei rivals the Blue Bulls. He remained in the squad for the remainder of the competition, eventually featuring in all 13 of his side's matches, scoring further tries in their return match against the Blue Bulls and their penultimate match of the regular season against Western Province to help the Golden Lions finish in third spot and secure a semifinal berth. The team fell short at that stage, losing 5–19 to Western Province in Cape Town.

=== Super Rugby and South Africa (2018); doping ban ===
In 2018, Dyantyi was named in the Lions squad for the 2018 Super Rugby season. He was named on the left wing for their first match of the season against the Sharks to make his Super Rugby debut, and took just 22 minutes to score his first Super Rugby try in a 26–19 victory. He scored two more in their next match, a 47–27 victory over Argentine side the Jaguares, and scored further tries against the Blues and Sunwolves as he firmly established himself as the team's first choice left wing. A torn pectoral muscle ruled him out for six weeks, but he returned for four matches before the break for the June internationals, including a match against the Brumbies where he played in an unfamiliar outside centre role.

South Africa head coach Rassie Erasmus included Dyantyi in the national squad for the incoming series against England and he started and scored a try in their 42–39 victory in the first test. He also started their second and third test matches, helping South Africa to a 2–1 win in the series.

Dyantyi returned to Super Rugby action, playing in their final two matches of the regular season and scoring a try in their match against the Bulls to help the Lions finish top of the South African Conference. A win over the Jaguares in the Qualifiers was followed up by a 44–26 win over the Waratahs in the semi-finals — with Dyantyi scoring a 26th minute try — to qualify for the final. Dyantyi was named on the bench for the final against the Crusaders and could not prevent his side losing the match 18–37 in Christchurch to finish the competition as runners-up. Dyantyi's try haul of seven tries was the joint-second most by a Lions player'; replacement winger Madosh Tambwe also scored seven while hooker Malcolm Marx topped the try-scoring charts with 12 tries.

Dyantyi was again named in the South Africa national squad for the 2018 Rugby Championship, and scored two tries in his first start in this competition, a 34–21 victory over Argentina in Durban. He started in losses away to Argentina and Australia before scoring two tries in their 36–34 win over New Zealand, their first victory in New Zealand since 2009. He also scored a try in their next match — a 23-12 win against Australia — after just 25 seconds.

In August 2019, Dyantyi was suspended from playing after testing positive for metandienone, methyltestosterone and LGD-4033. He was subsequently issued with a four-year ban for the anti-doping rule violation which expired in August 2023.

=== 2023 Return to playing ===
In June 2023 it was announced that he had signed with the Sharks and would begin training with them ahead of his ban ending in August 2023.

In 2026, Dyantyi signed for French club RC Narbonne.

== Honours and awards ==
On 25 November 2018 at the World Rugby Awards in Monaco, Dyantyi was named the World Rugby Breakthrough Player of the Year, after a season that saw him score six tries in thirteen appearances for the South Africa national team. He is the fourth winner of this award and the first South African.

== International appearances ==
Dyantyi appeared in the following matches for South Africa:

Date	Competition	Opposition	Venue	Result	Score	No	Tries	Pts
9 Jun 2018	2018 incoming tours	England	Johannesburg	W	42–39	11	1	5
16 Jun 2018	2018 incoming tours	England	Bloemfontein	W	23–12	11	0	0
23 Jun 2018	2018 incoming tours	England	Cape Town	L	10–25	11	0	0
18 Aug 2018	2018 Rugby Championship	Argentina	Durban	W	34–21	11	2	10
25 Aug 2018	2018 Rugby Championship	Argentina	Mendoza	L	19–32	11	0	0
8 Sep 2018	2018 Rugby Championship	Australia	Brisbane	L	18–23	11	0	0
15 Sep 2018	2018 Rugby Championship	New Zealand	Wellington	W	36–34	11	2	10
29 Sep 2018	2018 Rugby Championship	Australia	Port Elizabeth	W	23–12	11	1	5
6 Oct 2018	2018 Rugby Championship	New Zealand	Pretoria	L	30–32	11	0	0
3 Nov 2018	2018 outgoing tours	England	London	L	11–12	11	0	0
10 Nov 2018	2018 outgoing tours	France	Paris	W	29–26	11	0	0
17 Nov 2018	2018 outgoing tours	Scotland	Edinburgh	W	26–20	11	0	0
24 Nov 2018	2018 outgoing tours	Wales	Cardiff	L	11–20	11	0	0
Career				13 matches			6	30
