= Joe Moody (rugby union) =

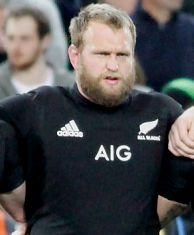
- Moody playing for New Zealand, August 2017
- Full name: Joseph Paul Tamatea Moody
- Born: 18 September 1988 (age 38) Christchurch, New Zealand
- Height: 188 cm (6 ft 2 in)
- Weight: 120 kg (265 lb; 18 st 13 lb)
- School: Christ's College

Rugby union career
- Position: Prop
- Current team: Canterbury, Crusaders
Senior career
Years	Team	Apps	(Points)
2011–	Canterbury	34	(15)
2013–	Crusaders	120	(20)
- Correct as of 24 June 2023
International career
Years	Team	Apps	(Points)
2014–	New Zealand	57	(25)
2015	Māori All Blacks	2	(0)
2020	South Island	1	(0)
- Correct as of 24 June 2023

Joseph Paul Tamatea Moody (born 18 September 1988) is a retired New Zealand rugby union footballer who played as a prop for the Crusaders in Super Rugby and Canterbury in the Bunnings NPC. He made his debut for New Zealand in 2014 and has 57 international caps.

== Early life ==
Moody was born in Christchurch. He is affiliated to the Ngāi Tahu Māori tribe and grew up on Tuahiwi Marae.

== Rugby union career ==
Moody started playing rugby league at a young age and aspired to play for the Kiwis over the ABs, until the high-school rugby changed that. He played rugby at Woodend rugby club at a young age and later Lincoln Rugby Club where he still plays for the Senior Rugby team between representative rugby for Canterbury and the All Blacks.

He was a member of the Crusaders Wider Training Squad for the 2013 Super Rugby season and was subsequently promoted to the senior squad for the 2013 season. He was included in the All Blacks squad for the 2013 Rugby Championship as cover for injured Crusaders' teammate Wyatt Crockett. Moody was named in New Zealand's 31-man squad for the 2015 Rugby World Cup where he played in the knockout stages. Moody eventually supplanted Crockett as the first-choice loosehead prop in 2016 when he was named in the All Blacks again.

Moody was a member of the Māori All Blacks in 2015.

Moody was warned for a dangerous tackle in 2016 and was yellow-carded twice in the 2016–17 international season including for a spear tackle.

Moody played in the 2019 Rugby World Cup in Japan, playing in five of their six tests during the competition. Moody started in all three of the knockout rounds for New Zealand, including their 7–19 loss to England in the semi-final.

== List of international test tries ==
Try	Date	Venue	Opponent	Result	Competition
1	1 November 2014	Soldier Field, Chicago, United States of America	United States of America	74–6 (Won)	2014 End-of-Year tests
2	16 June 2018	Westpac Stadium, Wellington, New Zealand	France	26–16 (Won)	2018 Mid-Year tests
3	25 August 2018	Eden Park, Auckland, New Zealand	Australia	40–12 (Won)	2018 Rugby Championship
4	6 October 2019	Tokyo Stadium, Tokyo, Japan	Namibia	71–9 (Won)	2019 Rugby World Cup
5	1 November 2019	Tokyo Stadium, Tokyo, Japan	Wales	40–17 (Won)	2019 Rugby World Cup

Updated: 16 December 2019 Source:

== Wrestling career ==
Moody wrestled from a young age until he was 21. He won several national titles.

=== Statistics ===
Date	Competition	Style	Age Group	Weight Class	Rank
25 August 2007	World Championship	Freestyle	Juniors	96.0	15
2 March 2007	Oceania Championship	Freestyle	Seniors	96.0	1
2 March 2007	Oceania Championship	Freestyle	Juniors	96.0	1
2 March 2007	Oceania Championship	Greco-Roman	Juniors	96.0	1
2 March 2007	Oceania Championship	Greco-Roman	Seniors	96.0	2
1 May 2006	Oceania Championship	Greco-Roman	Seniors	96.0	1
1 May 2006	Oceania Championship	Greco-Roman	Juniors	96.0	1
30 April 2006	Oceania Championship	Freestyle	Juniors	96.0	1
30 April 2006	Oceania Championship	Freestyle	Seniors	96.0	1

== Honours ==
New Zealand

- Rugby World Cup / Webb Ellis Cup
  - Third-place: 2019
