= Judgement Day (rugby union) =

Annual Welsh Rugby Union event at the Millennium Stadium in Cardiff

The official logo of Judgement Day. The regional badges: Cardiff Rugby top left, Scarlets top right, Dragons bottom left and Ospreys bottom right

Judgement Day (Welsh: Dydd y Farn) is an annual Welsh Rugby Union event that takes place at Millennium Stadium in Cardiff and is part of the United Rugby Championship competition. The four regions – Cardiff Rugby, Dragons, Ospreys and Scarlets – join with the Welsh Rugby Union in organising a double-header fixture at the Millennium Stadium. The annual derby day clash will be repeated in the foreseeable future, with the two east Wales regions taking on the two west Wales regions. In 2020, the two matches were held on consecutive days at Rodney Parade due to the COVID-19 pandemic causing a change to the format of the 2019–20 season and the Millennium Stadium being unavailable due to it being used as the Dragon's Heart Hospital.

After a three-year hiatus, the event returned to the Millennium Stadium for the 2022–23 season with over 40,000 spectators in attendance. The event was moved to the Cardiff City Stadium the following year due to the Millennium Stadium being used for various concerts in June. On 30 May 2024, it was confirmed that the event would return to the Millennium Stadium once again in 2025 with the fixtures taking place in April.

== Judgement Day I (2013) ==
2013 was the inaugural year of Judgement Day, which saw Newport Gwent Dragons play Scarlets and Cardiff Blues play Ospreys.

=== Newport Gwent Dragons vs Scarlets ===
30 March 2013
14:30 GMT (UTC+00)

Newport Gwent Dragons	20–28	Scarlets
Try: J. Evans 36' c D. Evans 75' c Con: Prydie (2/2); Pen: Prydie (2/2) 40', 56'	Report	Try: North (2) 26' c, 68' m J. Davies 66' c Con: O. Williams (2/3); Pen: O. Williams (3/6) 19', 45', 58'

Millennium Stadium
Attendance: 36,174
Referee: Peter Fitzgibbon (Ireland)

Team details

FB	15	(Wales) Tom Prydie
RW	14	(Wales) Will Harries
OC	13	(Wales) Pat Leach
IC	12	(Wales) Jack Dixon
LW	11	(Wales) Ross Wardle		(substituted off) 64'
FH	10	(Wales) Dan Evans
SH	9	(Wales) Jonathan Evans
N8	8	(Wales) Taulupe Faletau	(yellow card) 18' to 28'
OF	7	(Wales) Nic Cudd
BF	6	(Wales) Dan Lydiate		(substituted off) 62'
RL	5	(Wales) Robert Sidoli		(substituted off) 62'
LL	4	(Wales) Andrew Coombs (c)
TP	3	(England) Dan Way		(substituted off) 59'
HK	2	(Wales) Hugh Gustafson		(substituted off) 57'
LP	1	(Wales) Aaron Coundley		(substituted off) 70'
Replacements:
HK	16	(Wales) Sam Parry		(substituted on) 57'
PR	17	(Wales) Owen Evans		(substituted on) 70'
PR	18	(Wales) Nathan Buck		(substituted on) 59'
LK	19	(Wales) Jevon Groves		(substituted on) 62'
FL	20	(Wales) Ieuan Jones		(substituted on) 62'
SH	21	(Wales) Wayne Evans
FH	22	(Wales) Steffan Jones			(substituted on) 79'
WG	23	(Wales) Adam Hughes		(substituted on) 64'	(substituted off) 79'
Coach:
(Wales) Darren Edwards

FB	15	(Wales) Gareth Owen	(substituted off) 75'
RW	14	(Wales) George North
OC	13	(Wales) Jonathan Davies
IC	12	(Wales) Scott Williams
LW	11	(Wales) Liam Williams
FH	10	(Wales) Owen Williams	(substituted off) 71'
SH	9	(Wales) Aled Davies	(substituted off) 70'
N8	8	(Wales) Rob McCusker (c)
OF	7	(Wales) Jon Edwards	(substituted off) 54'
BF	6	(Wales) Aaron Shingler
RL	5	(South Africa) Johan Snyman
LL	4	(South Africa) George Earle	(substituted off) 66'
TP	3	(Wales) Samson Lee	(substituted off) 55'
HK	2	(Wales) Matthew Rees	(substituted off) 41'
LP	1	(Wales) Phil John	(substituted off) 69'
Replacements:
HK	16	(Wales) Ken Owens	(substituted on) 41'
PR	17	(Wales) Rhodri Jones	(substituted on) 69'
PR	18	(Fiji) Deacon Manu	(substituted on) 55'
LK	19	(Tonga) Sione Timani	(substituted on) 66'
FL	20	(Wales) Josh Turnbull	(substituted on) 54'
SH	21	(Wales) Rhodri Williams	(substituted on) 70'
FH	22	(Wales) Aled Thomas	(substituted on) 71'
CE	23	(Wales) Gareth Maule	(substituted on) 75'
Coach:
(Ireland) Simon Easterby

Man of the Match:
(Wales) Dan Evans (Newport Gwent Dragons)

Touch judges:
Neil Hennessy (Wales)
Jon Mason (Wales)
Television match official:
Tony Rowlands (Wales)

=== Cardiff Blues vs Ospreys ===
30 March 2013
17:15 GMT (UTC+00)

(1 BP) Cardiff Blues	16–23	Ospreys
Try: Halfpenny 6' c Con: Halfpenny (1/1); Pen: Halfpenny (3/3) 25', 53', 63'	Report	Try: King 20' c Spratt 33' c Con: Biggar (2/2); Pen: Biggar (3/5) 11', 31', 76'

Millennium Stadium
Attendance: 36,174
Referee: Nigel Owens (Wales)

Team details

FB	15	(Wales) Leigh Halfpenny
RW	14	(Wales) Owen Williams
OC	13	(Wales) Gavin Evans (c)	46' to 58'
IC	12	(Wales) Dafydd Hewitt
LW	11	(Wales) Harry Robinson
FH	10	(Wales) Rhys Patchell
SH	9	(Wales) Lloyd Williams			(substituted off) 62'
N8	8	(Wales) Luke Hamilton	(substituted off) 41'
OF	7	(Wales) Sam Warburton
BF	6	(New Zealand) Michael Paterson
RL	5	(Wales) Lou Reed
LL	4	(Samoa) Filo Paulo
TP	3	(Wales) Scott Andrews
HK	2	(Wales) Marc Breeze	(substituted off) 55'
LP	1	(Wales) Sam Hobbs	(substituted off) 41'
Replacements:
HK	16	(Wales) Kristian Dacey	(substituted on) 55'
PR	17	(Wales) Tom Davies
PR	18	(Tonga) Taufaʻao Filise	(substituted on) 41'
N8	19	(Ireland) Robin Copeland	(substituted on) 41'
FL	20	(Wales) Rory Watts-Jones
SH	21	(Wales) Lewis Jones	(substituted on) 46'	(substituted off) 58'	(substituted on) 62'
FH	22	(Wales) Ceri Sweeney
CE	23	(Wales) Gareth Davies
Coach:
(Wales) Phil Davies

FB	15	(Wales) Richard Fussell
RW	14	(Wales) Tom Habberfield
OC	13	(Wales) Jonathan Spratt
IC	12	(Wales) Ashley Beck
LW	11	(Wales) Tom Isaacs	(substituted off) 58'
FH	10	(Wales) Dan Biggar
SH	9	(Samoa) Kahn Fotuali'i
N8	8	(Wales) Jonathan Thomas	(substituted off) 76'
OF	7	(Wales) Justin Tipuric
BF	6	(Wales) James King
RL	5	(Wales) Ian Evans	(substituted off) 18'
LL	4	(Wales) Alun Wyn Jones (c)
TP	3	(Wales) Adam Jones
HK	2	(Wales) Richard Hibbard	(substituted off) 65'
LP	1	(Wales) Ryan Bevington	(substituted off) 58'
Replacements:
HK	16	(Wales) Scott Baldwin	(substituted on) 65'
PR	17	(Wales) Duncan Jones	(substituted on) 58'
PR	18	(Moldova) Dmitri Arhip
LK	19	(Wales) Lloyd Peers	(substituted on) 76'
FL	20	(Wales) Joe Bearman	(substituted on) 18'
SH	21	(Wales) Rhys Webb
FH	22	(Wales) Matthew Morgan
CE	23	(Wales) Ben John	(substituted on) 58'
Coach:
(Wales) Steve Tandy

Man of the Match:
(Wales) Adam Jones (Ospreys)

Touch judges:
Ian Davies (Wales)
Sean Brickell (Wales)
Television match official:
Nigel Whitehouse (Wales)

== Judgement Day II (2014) ==
2014 saw the return of the double derby at the Millennium Stadium as Cardiff Blues faced Scarlets and Newport Gwent Dragons faced Ospreys.

=== Cardiff Blues vs Scarlets ===
20 April 2014
14:00 BST (UTC+01)

Cardiff Blues	17–13	Scarlets (1 BP)
Try: Cuthbert 4' m Pen: G. Davies (4/5) 10', 16', 36', 76'	Report	Try: Priestland 33' m Owens 71' m Pen: Priestland (1/2) 40'

Millennium Stadium
Attendance: 30,441
Referee: Ian Davies (Wales)

Team details

FB	15	(Wales) Dan Fish
RW	14	(Wales) Alex Cuthbert
OC	13	(Wales) Cory Allen
IC	12	(Wales) Dafydd Hewitt
LW	11	(Wales) Chris Czekaj		(substituted off) 70'
FH	10	(Wales) Gareth Davies
SH	9	(Wales) Lewis Jones		(substituted off) 59'
N8	8	(Ireland) Robin Copeland	(red card) 55'
OF	7	(Wales) Josh Navidi
BF	6	(Wales) Macauley Cook
RL	5	(Samoa) Filo Paulo
LL	4	(Wales) Bradley Davies		(substituted off) 41'
TP	3	(Tonga) Taufaʻao Filise		(substituted off) 54'
HK	2	(Wales) Matthew Rees		(substituted off) 62'
LP	1	(Wales) Gethin Jenkins (c)
Replacements:
HK	16	(Wales) Rhys Williams		(substituted on) 62'
PR	17	(Wales) Tom Davies
PR	18	(Wales) Scott Andrews		(substituted on) 54'
LK	19	(Cyprus) Chris Dicomidis		(substituted on) 41'
FL	20	(Wales) Ellis Jenkins
SH	21	(Wales) Lloyd Williams		(substituted on) 59'
FH	22	(England) Simon Humberstone
WG	23	(Wales) Harry Robinson		(substituted on) 70'
Coach:
(Wales) Dale McIntosh (Wales) Paul John

FB	15	(Wales) Liam Williams	(yellow card) 6' to 16' (red card) 55'
RW	14	(Wales) Kristian Phillips
OC	13	(Wales) Jonathan Davies (c)
IC	12	(Wales) Gareth Maule
LW	11	(Wales) Jordan Williams
FH	10	(Wales) Rhys Priestland		(substituted off) 59'
SH	9	(Wales) Gareth Davies		(substituted off) 65'
N8	8	(Wales) Josh Turnbull
OF	7	(Scotland) John Barclay
BF	6	(Wales) Aaron Shingler
RL	5	(South Africa) George Earle		(substituted off) 54'
LL	4	(Wales) Jake Ball
TP	3	(Wales) Samson Lee		(substituted off) 59'
HK	2	(Wales) Ken Owens
LP	1	(Wales) Phil John		(substituted off) 54'
Replacements:
HK	16	(Wales) Kirby Myhill
PR	17	(Wales) Rob Evans		(substituted on) 54'
PR	18	(Wales) Rhodri Jones		(substituted on) 59'
LK	19	(South Africa) Johan Snyman		(substituted on) 54'
FL	20	(Tonga) Sione Timani
SH	21	(Wales) Rhodri Williams		(substituted on) 65'
FH	22	(Wales) Steven Shingler		(substituted on) 59'
WG	23	(New Zealand) Frazier Climo
Coach:
(Ireland) Simon Easterby

Man of the Match:
(Wales) Cory Allen (Cardiff Blues)

Touch judges:
Sean Brickel (Wales)
Simon Rees (Wales)
Television match official:
Gareth Simmonds (Wales)

=== Newport Gwent Dragons vs Ospreys ===
20 April 2014
16:45 BST (UTC+01)

Newport Gwent Dragons	10–20	Ospreys
Try: Rees 46' c Con: Burton (1/1); Pen: Prydie (1/1) 64'	Report	Try: Habberfield 61' c Penalty try 78' c Con: Biggar (2/2); Pen: Biggar (2/2) 53', 70'

Millennium Stadium
Attendance: 30,441
Referee: Nigel Owens (Wales)

Team details

FB	15	(Wales) Hallam Amos
RW	14	(Wales) Tom Prydie
OC	13	(Wales) Tyler Morgan	(yellow card) 76' to 80'
IC	12	(Wales) Jack Dixon
LW	11	(Wales) Will Harries
FH	10	(Italy) Kris Burton		(substituted off) 52'	(substituted on) 57'
SH	9	(Wales) Richie Rees		(substituted off) 79'
N8	8	(Wales) Taulupe Faletau
OF	7	(Wales) Lewis Evans (c)		(substituted off) 79'
BF	6	(Fiji) Netani Talei		(substituted off) 21'
RL	5	(Wales) Matthew Screech
LL	4	(Wales) Cory Hill		(substituted off) 74'
TP	3	(Wales) Duncan Bell		(substituted off) 74'
HK	2	(Wales) T. Rhys Thomas		(substituted off) 74'
LP	1	(Wales) Phil Price		(substituted off) 70'
Replacements:
HK	16	(Wales) Sam Parry		(substituted on) 74'
PR	17	(Wales) Owen Evans		(substituted on) 70'
PR	18	(Scotland) Bruce Douglas		(substituted on) 74'
LK	19	(Wales) Jevon Groves		(substituted on) 74'
FL	20	(Wales) Nic Cudd	(yellow card) 52' to 62'	(substituted on) 21'
SH	21	(Wales) Jonathan Evans		(substituted on) 79'
FH	22	(Wales) Jason Tovey		(substituted on) 52'	(substituted off) 57'
CE	23	(Wales) Lewis Robling		(substituted on) 79'
Coach:
(Wales) Lyn Jones

FB	15	(Wales) Richard Fussell		(substituted off) 44'
RW	14	(Canada) Jeff Hassler		(substituted off) 70'
OC	13	(Wales) Jonathan Spratt	(yellow card) 64' to 74'
IC	12	(Wales) Ashley Beck
LW	11	(South Africa) Hanno Dirksen
FH	10	(Wales) Dan Biggar
SH	9	(Wales) Tom Habberfield		(substituted off) 75'
N8	8	(Wales) Dan Baker
OF	7	(Wales) Justin Tipuric		(substituted off) 70'
BF	6	(Wales) James King		(substituted off) 74'
RL	5	(Wales) Alun Wyn Jones (c)
LL	4	(Wales) Ryan Jones	(yellow card) 33' to 43'
TP	3	(Wales) Aaron Jarvis		(substituted off) 61'
HK	2	(Wales) Scott Baldwin
LP	1	(Wales) Duncan Jones		(substituted off) 52'
Replacements:
HK	16	(Wales) Scott Otten
PR	17	(Wales) Nicky Smith		(substituted on) 52'
PR	18	(Wales) Adam Jones		(substituted on) 61'
FL	19	(Canada) Tyler Ardron		(substituted on) 74'
FL	20	(Wales) Sam Lewis		(substituted on) 70'
SH	21	(Italy) Tito Tebaldi		(substituted on) 75'
FH	22	(Wales) Sam Davies		(substituted on) 44'
WG	23	(Fiji) Aisea Natoga		(substituted on) 70'
Coach:
(Wales) Steve Tandy

Man of the Match:
(Wales) Nic Cudd (Newport Gwent Dragons)

Touch judges:
Neil Hennessy (Wales)
Jon Mason (Wales)
Television match official:
Derek Bevan (Wales)

== Judgement Day III (2015) ==
2015 saw the first double derby at the Millennium Stadium under the new Six Year Rugby Services Agreement. Cardiff Blues faced the Ospreys and Newport Gwent Dragons faced the Scarlets. The 52,762 crowd for the 2 matches, was a Judgment Day and Pro 12 match record.

=== Cardiff Blues vs Ospreys ===
25 April 2015
14:30 BST (UTC+01)

Cardiff Blues	23–31	Ospreys (1 BP)
Try: Navidi 58' c Fish 80' c Con: G. Davies (1/1); Anscombe (1/1); Pen: Anscombe (3/3) 7', 11', 27'	Report	Try: D. Evans 34' c Biggar 44' c Grabham 52' c John 65' c Con: Biggar (4/4); Pen: Biggar (1/2) 61'

Millennium Stadium
Attendance: 52,762
Referee: Nigel Owens (Wales)

Team details

FB	15	(Wales) Rhys Patchell	(substituted off) 56'
RW	14	(Argentina) Lucas González Amorosino
OC	13	(Wales) Tom Isaacs
IC	12	(Wales) Garyn Smith			(substituted off) 67'
LW	11	(Argentina) Joaquin Tuculet
FH	10	(New Zealand) Gareth Anscombe	56' to 65'
SH	9	(Wales) Lloyd Williams	(substituted off) 67'
N8	8	(Wales) Josh Navidi
OF	7	(Wales) Sam Warburton
BF	6	(Wales) Josh Turnbull
RL	5	(Samoa) Filo Paulo	(substituted off) 47'
LL	4	(Cyprus) Chris Dicomidis
TP	3	(Wales) Craig Mitchell	(substituted off) 67'
HK	2	(Wales) Kristian Dacey	(substituted off) 47'
LP	1	(Wales) Gethin Jenkins (c)	25' to 32'		(substituted off) 60'
Replacements:
HK	16	(Wales) Matthew Rees	(substituted on) 47'
PR	17	(Wales) Sam Hobbs	(substituted on) 25'	(substituted off) 32'	(substituted on) 60'
PR	18	(Wales) Scott Andrews	(substituted on) 67'
LK	19	(New Zealand) Jarrad Hoeata	(substituted on) 47'
FL	20	(Wales) Macauley Cook	(substituted on) 62'
SH	21	(Wales) Lewis Jones	(substituted on) 67'
FH	22	(Wales) Gareth Davies	(substituted on) 56'	(substituted off) 65'	(substituted on) 67'
FB	23	(Wales) Dan Fish	(substituted on) 56'
Coach:
(Wales) Dale McIntosh (Wales) Paul John

FB	15	(Wales) Dan Evans
RW	14	(Wales) Tom Grabham	(substituted off) 56'
OC	13	(Wales) Ben John	(substituted off) 73'
IC	12	(Fiji) Josh Matavesi
LW	11	(Wales) Eli Walker
FH	10	(Wales) Dan Biggar
SH	9	(Wales) Rhys Webb	(substituted off) 69'
N8	8	(Wales) Dan Baker	(substituted off) 69'
OF	7	(Wales) Justin Tipuric
BF	6	(Wales) Dan Lydiate	(substituted off) 50'
RL	5	(Wales) Alun Wyn Jones (c)
LL	4	(Wales) Lloyd Peers
TP	3	(Wales) Aaron Jarvis	(substituted off) 58'
HK	2	(Wales) Scott Baldwin	(substituted off) 67'
LP	1	(Wales) Nicky Smith	(substituted off) 73'
Replacements:
HK	16	(Wales) Sam Parry	(substituted on) 67'
PR	17	(Wales) Marc Thomas	(substituted on) 73'
PR	18	(Moldova) Dmitri Arhip	(substituted on) 58'
FL	19	(Canada) Tyler Ardron	(substituted on) 69'
FL	20	(Wales) James King	(substituted on) 50'
SH	21	(Wales) Tom Habberfield	(substituted on) 69'
FH	22	(Wales) Sam Davies	(substituted on) 73'
CE	23	(Wales) Jonathan Spratt	(substituted on) 56'
Coach:
(Wales) Steve Tandy

Man of the Match:
(Wales) Dan Biggar (Ospreys)

Touch judges:
Rhys Thomas (Wales)
Gwyn Morris (Wales)
Television match official:
Gareth Simmonds (Wales)

=== Newport Gwent Dragons vs Scarlets ===
25 April 2015
16:45 BST (UTC+01)

Newport Gwent Dragons	10–29	Scarlets (1 BP)
Try: Morgan 16' c Con: D. Jones (1/1); Pen: D. Jones (1/2) 24'	Report	Try: Owens 37' c S. Williams 39' c L. Williams 41' c Robinson 57' m Con: Priestland (3/4); Pen: Priestland (1/1) 6'

Millennium Stadium
Attendance: 52,762
Referee: George Clancy (Ireland)

Team details

FB	15	(Wales) Rhys Jones			(substituted off) 51'
RW	14	(Wales) Tom Prydie	(substituted off) 71'
OC	13	(Wales) Tyler Morgan	5' to 13'
IC	12	(Wales) Jack Dixon
LW	11	(Wales) Hallam Amos
FH	10	(Wales) Dorian Jones
SH	9	(Wales) Jonathan Evans	(substituted off) 58'
N8	8	(Wales) Taulupe Faletau
OF	7	(Wales) James Benjamin	(substituted off) 60'
BF	6	(Wales) James Thomas
RL	5	(South Africa) Rynard Landman (c)
LL	4	(Wales) Matthew Screech	(substituted off) 60'
TP	3	(South Africa) Brok Harris	(substituted off) 67'
HK	2	(Wales) Rhys Buckley	(substituted off) 46'
LP	1	(Wales) Phil Price	(substituted off) 64'
Replacements:
HK	16	(Wales) T. Rhys Thomas	(substituted on) 46'
PR	17	(Wales) Luke Garrett	(substituted on) 64'
PR	18	(England) Lloyd Fairbrother	(substituted on) 67'
FL	19	(New Zealand) Nick Crosswell	(substituted on) 60'
FL	20	(Wales) Ollie Griffiths	(substituted on) 60'
SH	21	(Wales) Luc Jones	(substituted on) 58'
FH	22	(Wales) Carl Meyer	(substituted on) 5'	(substituted off) 13'	(substituted on) 51'
WG	23	(Wales) Ashton Hewitt	(substituted on) 71'
Coach:
(Wales) Lyn Jones

FB	15	(Wales) Liam Williams
RW	14	(Wales) Harry Robinson
OC	13	(New Zealand) Hadleigh Parkes	(substituted off) 60'
IC	12	(Wales) Scott Williams
LW	11	(Wales) Steff Evans
FH	10	(Wales) Rhys Priestland	(substituted off) 73'
SH	9	(Wales) Aled Davies	(substituted off) 58'
N8	8	(Scotland) John Barclay	(substituted off) 73'
OF	7	(Wales) James Davies
BF	6	(Wales) Aaron Shingler	(substituted off) 64'
RL	5	(Wales) Lewis Rawlins
LL	4	(Wales) Jake Ball
TP	3	(England) Peter Edwards	(substituted off) 67'
HK	2	(Wales) Ken Owens (c)	(substituted off) 75'
LP	1	(Wales) Phil John	(substituted off) 73'
Replacements:
HK	16	(Wales) Ryan Elias	(substituted on) 75'
PR	17	(Wales) Wyn Jones	(substituted on) 73'
PR	18	(South Africa) Jacobie Adriaanse	(substituted on) 67'
FL	19	(Wales) Rob McCusker	(substituted on) 73'
N8	20	(Wales) Rory Pitman	(substituted on) 64'
SH	21	(Wales) Rhodri Williams	(substituted on) 58'
FH	22	(Wales) Steven Shingler	(substituted on) 75'
CE	23	(New Zealand) Regan King	(substituted on) 60'
Coach:
(New Zealand) Wayne Pivac

Man of the Match:
(Wales) Liam Williams (Scarlets)

Touch judges:
Neil Hennessy (Wales)
Sean Brickell (Wales)
Television match official:
Tim Hayes (Wales)

== Judgement Day IV (2016) ==
=== Cardiff Blues vs Ospreys ===
30 April 2016
14:00 BST (UTC+01)

Cardiff Blues	27–40	Ospreys (1 BP)
Try: Summerhill 41' m Navidi 62' c Con: Anscombe (1/2); Pen: Anscombe (5/5) 10', 30', 36', 49', 73'	Report	Try: King 24' c Dirksen (2) 53' m, 58' c Underhill 69' c Webb (2) 74' c, 78' c Con: Biggar (5/6)

Millennium Stadium
Attendance: 68,262
Referee: Nigel Owens (Wales)

Team details

FB	15	(Wales) Dan Fish
RW	14	(Wales) Aled Summerhill
OC	13	(Wales) Garyn Smith
IC	12	(Samoa) Rey Lee-Lo
LW	11	(Wales) Tom Isaacs	(substituted off) 76'
FH	10	(Wales) Gareth Anscombe
SH	9	(Wales) Lewis Jones	(substituted off) 57'
N8	8	(Wales) Josh Navidi
OF	7	(Wales) Ellis Jenkins
BF	6	(Wales) Sam Warburton	(substituted off) 28'
RL	5	(Wales) James Down
LL	4	(Wales) Josh Turnbull
TP	3	(Tonga) Taufaʻao Filise	(substituted off) 65'
HK	2	(Wales) Matthew Rees	(substituted off) 55'
LP	1	(Wales) Gethin Jenkins (c)	(substituted off) 65'
Replacements:
HK	16	(Wales) Kristian Dacey	(substituted on) 55'
PR	17	(Wales) Brad Thyer	(substituted on) 65'
PR	18	(Wales) Dillon Lewis	(substituted on) 65'
LK	19	(New Zealand) Jarrad Hoeata	(substituted on) 28'	(substituted off) 61'
N8	20	(Italy) Manoa Vosawai		(substituted on) 61'	(substituted off) 79'
SH	21	(Wales) Tomos Williams	(substituted on) 57'
FH	22	(Wales) Jarrod Evans			(substituted on) 79'
CE	23	(Wales) Gavin Evans	(substituted on) 76'
Coach:
(Wales) Danny Wilson

FB	15	(Wales) Dan Evans	(substituted off) 64'
RW	14	(South Africa) Hanno Dirksen
OC	13	(Wales) Jonathan Spratt	(substituted off) 49'
IC	12	(Wales) Owen Watkin
LW	11	(Wales) Ben John
FH	10	(Wales) Dan Biggar
SH	9	(Wales) Rhys Webb (c)	(substituted off) 76'
N8	8	(Wales) Dan Lydiate
OF	7	(Wales) James King
BF	6	(Wales) Olly Cracknell	(substituted off) 49'
RL	5	(South Africa) Rynier Bernardo	(substituted off) 65'
LL	4	(Wales) Adam Beard	(substituted off) 70'
TP	3	(Moldova) Dmitri Arhip	(substituted off) 49'
HK	2	(Wales) Scott Baldwin
LP	1	(Wales) Nicky Smith	(substituted off) 51'
Replacements:
HK	16	(Wales) Sam Parry	(substituted on) 70'
PR	17	(Wales) Gareth Thomas	(substituted on) 51'
PR	18	(Wales) Aaron Jarvis	(substituted on) 49'
LK	19	(Wales) Rory Thornton	(substituted on) 65'
FL	20	(England) Sam Underhill	(substituted on) 49'
SH	21	(New Zealand) Brendon Leonard	(substituted on) 76'
FH	22	(Wales) Sam Davies	(substituted on) 64'
CE	23	(Fiji) Josh Matavesi	(substituted on) 49'
Coach:
(Wales) Steve Tandy

Man of the Match:
(Wales) James King (Ospreys)

Touch judges:
Leighton Hodges (Wales)
Martyn Lewis (Wales)
Television match official:
Jon Mason (Wales)

=== Newport Gwent Dragons vs Scarlets ===
30 April 2016
17:00 BST (UTC+01)

Newport Gwent Dragons	20–34	Scarlets (1 BP)
Try: Warren 22' c Hughes 67' c Con: O'Brien (2/2); Pen: O'Brien (2/3) 26', 31'	Report	Try: S. Williams 8' c Shingler 13' c S. Evans 45' c G. Davies 74' c Con: Shingler (4/4); Pen: Shingler (2/2) 24', 29'

Millennium Stadium
Attendance: 68,262
Referee: Ben Whitehouse (Wales)

Team details

FB	15	(South Africa) Carl Meyer
RW	14	(Wales) Adam Hughes
OC	13	(Wales) Adam Warren
IC	12	(Wales) Jack Dixon
LW	11	(Wales) Hallam Amos
FH	10	(Wales) Angus O'Brien
SH	9	(England) Charlie Davies	(substituted off) 54'
N8	8	(Wales) Taulupe Faletau
OF	7	(Wales) Nic Cudd	(substituted off) 10'
BF	6	(Wales) Lewis Evans (c)
RL	5	(New Zealand) Nick Crosswell
LL	4	(South Africa) Rynard Landman	(substituted off) 62'
TP	3	(South Africa) Brok Harris	(substituted off) 72'
HK	2	(Wales) Elliot Dee	(substituted off) 72'
LP	1	(Wales) Phil Price	(substituted off) 72'
Replacements:
HK	16	(Wales) Rhys Buckley	(substituted on) 72'
PR	17	(Wales) Luke Garrett	(substituted on) 72'
PR	18	(England) Lloyd Fairbrother	(substituted on) 72'
LK	19	(Wales) Matthew Screech	(substituted on) 62'
N8	20	(England) Ed Jackson	(substituted on) 10'
SH	21	(South Africa) Sarel Pretorius	(substituted on) 54'
FH	22	(Wales) Dorian Jones
FB	23	(Wales) Rhys Jones
Coach:
(Wales) Kingsley Jones

FB	15	(New Zealand) Michael Collins		(substituted off) 23'
RW	14	(Wales) Liam Williams
OC	13	(New Zealand) Hadleigh Parkes
IC	12	(Wales) Scott Williams		(substituted off) 62'
LW	11	(Wales) Steff Evans
FH	10	(Wales) Steven Shingler
SH	9	(Wales) Aled Davies		(substituted off) 62'
N8	8	(Scotland) John Barclay		(substituted off) 39'	(substituted on) 47'	(substituted off) 75'
OF	7	(Wales) James Davies
BF	6	(Wales) Lewis Rawlins
RL	5	(South Africa) David Bulbring		(substituted off) 64'
LL	4	(Wales) Jake Ball
TP	3	(Wales) Samson Lee		(substituted off) 29'
HK	2	(Wales) Ken Owens (c)		(substituted off) 69'
LP	1	(Wales) Rob Evans				(substituted off) 69'
Replacements:
HK	16	(Wales) Ryan Elias		(substituted on) 69'
PR	17	(Wales) Dylan Evans		(substituted on) 39'	(substituted off) 47'	(substituted on) 69'
PR	18	(England) Peter Edwards	(yellow card) 37' to 47'	(substituted on) 29'
N8	19	(Wales) Jack Condy				(substituted on) 75'
N8	20	(Wales) Morgan Allen		(substituted on) 64'
SH	21	(Wales) Gareth Davies		(substituted on) 62'
FH	22	(Wales) Aled Thomas		(substituted on) 62'
FB	23	(Wales) Gareth Owen		(substituted on) 23'
Coach:
(New Zealand) Wayne Pivac

Man of the Match:
(Wales) Scott Williams (Scarlets)

Touch judges:
Gwyn Morris (Wales)
Wayne Davies (Wales)
Television match official:
Gareth Simmonds (Wales)

== Judgement Day V (2017) ==
=== Cardiff Blues vs Ospreys ===
15 April 2017
14:45 BST (UTC+01)

(1 BP) Cardiff Blues	35–17	Ospreys
Try: Dacey 5' c L. Williams 19' c N. Williams 26' c Anscombe 46' c Con: Anscombe (5/5) 6', 20', 27', 45', 47'	Report	Try: Evans 61' c James 67' c Con: S. Davies (2/2) 61', 67'; Pen: S. Davies (1/1) 17'

Millennium Stadium
Attendance: 60,642
Referee: Andrew Brace (IRFU)

Team details

FB	15	(Wales) Matthew Morgan		(substituted off) 64'
RW	14	(Wales) Alex Cuthbert	(yellow card) 28' to 38'
OC	13	(Samoa) Rey Lee-Lo
IC	12	(New Zealand) Willis Halaholo
LW	11	(Wales) Rhun Williams		(substituted off) 74'
FH	10	(Wales) Gareth Anscombe	(yellow card) 61' to 71'
SH	9	(Wales) Lloyd Williams
N8	8	(New Zealand) Nick Williams		(substituted off) 61'
OF	7	(Wales) Ellis Jenkins
BF	6	(Wales) Josh Navidi
RL	5	(Wales) Macauley Cook
LL	4	(New Zealand) Jarrad Hoeata		(substituted off) 71'
TP	3	(Tonga) Taufaʻao Filise		(substituted off) 53'
HK	2	(Wales) Kristian Dacey		(substituted off) 59'
LP	1	(Wales) Gethin Jenkins (c)		(substituted off) 59'
Replacements:
HK	16	(Wales) Matthew Rees		(substituted on) 59'
PR	17	(Wales) Rhys Gill		(substituted on) 65'
PR	18	(Georgia (country)) Anton Peikrishvili		(substituted on) 59'
LK	19	(Wales) James Down		(substituted on) 71'
N8	20	(Wales) Sion Bennett		(substituted on) 61'
SH	21	(Wales) Tomos Williams
FH	22	(Wales) Steven Shingler		(substituted on) 64'
WG	23	(Wales) Aled Summerhill		(substituted on) 74'
Coach:
(England) Danny Wilson

FB	15	(Wales) Dan Evans
RW	14	(Wales) Keelan Giles
OC	13	(Wales) Ashley Beck
IC	12	(Fiji) Josh Matavesi	(substituted off) 45'
LW	11	(Wales) Dafydd Howells	(substituted off) 71'
FH	10	(Wales) Sam Davies
SH	9	(Wales) Rhys Webb (c)	(substituted off) 59'
N8	8	(Wales) Dan Baker	(substituted off) 59'
OF	7	(Wales) Justin Tipuric
BF	6	(Wales) James King
RL	5	(South Africa) Rory Thornton	(substituted off) 47'
LL	4	(Wales) Bradley Davies
TP	3	(South Africa) Brian Mujati	(substituted off) 47'
HK	2	(Wales) Scott Baldwin	(substituted off) 53'
LP	1	(Wales) Nicky Smith	(substituted off) 59'
Replacements:
HK	16	(Wales) Scott Otten	(substituted on) 53'
PR	17	(Wales) Paul James	(substituted on) 59'
PR	18	(Wales) Rhodri Jones	(substituted on) 47'
FL	19	(Canada) Tyler Ardron	(substituted on) 47'
LK	20	(Wales) Lloyd Ashley	(substituted on) 59'
SH	21	(Wales) Tom Habberfield	(substituted on) 59'
CE	22	(New Zealand) Kieron Fonotia	(substituted on) 45'
FH	23	(Wales) Luke Price	(substituted on) 71'
Coach:
(Wales) Steve Tandy

Man of the Match:
(Wales) Ellis Jenkins (Cardiff Blues)

Touch judges:
Sean Gallagher (Ireland)
Gwyn Morris (Wales)
Television match official:
Neil Hennessy (Wales)

=== Newport Gwent Dragons vs Scarlets ===
15 April 2017
17:15 BST (UTC+01)

(1 BP) Newport Gwent Dragons	16–21	Scarlets
Try: Hughes 79' c Con: O'Brien (1/1) 80'; Pen: O'Brien (3/3) 12', 13', 64'	Report	Try: J. Davies 59' c L. Williams 71' m Con: L. Williams (1/2) 61'; Pen: D. Jones (2/2) 26', 50'; L. Williams (1/1) 67'

Millennium Stadium
Attendance: 60,642
Referee: Nigel Owens (WRU)

Team details

FB	15	(South Africa) Carl Meyer		(substituted off) 62'
RW	14	(Wales) Adam Hughes	(yellow card) 58' to 68'
OC	13	(Wales) Tyler Morgan
IC	12	(New Zealand) Sam Beard
LW	11	(Wales) Adam Warren		(substituted off) 47'
FH	10	(Wales) Angus O'Brien
SH	9	(England) Charlie Davies		(substituted off) 54'
N8	8	(Wales) Lewis Evans (c)		(substituted off) 68'
OF	7	(Wales) Nic Cudd		(substituted off) 10'
BF	6	(Wales) Ollie Griffiths
RL	5	(Wales) Cory Hill
LL	4	(Wales) Matthew Screech		(substituted off) 56'
TP	3	(England) Lloyd Fairbrother		(substituted off) 5'
HK	2	(Wales) Rhys Buckley		(substituted off) 65'
LP	1	(Wales) Sam Hobbs		(substituted off) 65'
Replacements:
HK	16	(Wales) T. Rhys Thomas		(substituted on) 65'
PR	17	(Wales) Phil Price		(substituted on) 65'
PR	18	(South Africa) Brok Harris		(substituted on) 5'
LK	19	(Wales) Ashley Sweet		(substituted on) 56'
FL	20	(Wales) Harrison Keddie		(substituted on) 68'
FH	21	(Wales) Dorian Jones		(substituted on) 62'	(substituted off) 69'
WG	22	(Wales) Tom Prydie		(substituted on) 47'
CE	23	(Wales) Jack Dixon			(substituted on) 69'
Coach:
(Wales) Kingsley Jones

FB	15	(New Zealand) Johnny McNicholl	(substituted off) 73'
RW	14	(Wales) Liam Williams
OC	13	(Wales) Jonathan Davies
IC	12	(Wales) Scott Williams
LW	11	(Wales) Steff Evans
FH	10	(Wales) Dan Jones	(substituted off) 52'
SH	9	(Wales) Gareth Davies	(substituted off) 52'
N8	8	(Scotland) John Barclay
OF	7	(Wales) James Davies	(substituted off) 17'
BF	6	(Ireland) Tadhg Beirne
RL	5	(England) Tom Price	(substituted off) 52'
LL	4	(Wales) Jake Ball
TP	3	(Wales) Samson Lee	(substituted off) 73'
HK	2	(Wales) Ken Owens (c)	(substituted off) 73'
LP	1	(Wales) Rob Evans
Replacements:
HK	16	(Wales) Emyr Phillips	(substituted on) 73'
PR	17	(Wales) Wyn Jones
PR	18	(South Africa) Werner Kruger	(substituted on) 73'
LK	19	(South Africa) David Bulbring	(substituted on) 52'
FL	20	(Wales) Josh Macleod	(substituted on) 17'
SH	21	(Wales) Jonathan Evans	(substituted on) 52'
CE	22	(New Zealand) Hadleigh Parkes	(substituted on) 52'
WG	23	(Canada) D. T. H. van der Merwe	(substituted on) 73'
Coach:
(New Zealand) Wayne Pivac

Man of the Match:
(Wales) Ollie Griffiths (Newport Gwent Dragons)

Touch judges:
Adam Jones (Wales)
Sean Brickell (Wales)
Television match official:
Jon Mason (Wales)

== Judgement Day VI (2018) ==
Following the 2016–17 season, the Newport Gwent Dragons dropped their geographic identifiers from their name, becoming simply Dragons.

=== Dragons vs Scarlets ===
28 April 2018
15:05

Dragons	8–33	Scarlets (1 BP)
Try: Rosser 62' m Pen: Robson (1/1) 22'	Report	Try: Elias 5' c Penalty try 46'; Beirne (2) 50' m, 55' c S. Evans 74' c Con: Halfpenny (3/4) 6', 56', 75'

Millennium Stadium
Attendance: 62,338
Referee: Lloyd Linton (SRU)

=== Cardiff Blues vs Ospreys ===
28 April 2018
17:35

(1 BP) Cardiff Blues	23–26	Ospreys
Try: Anscombe 23' c Smith 29' c Con: Anscombe (2/2) 24', 30'; Pen: Anscombe (3/4) 13', 37', 67'	Report	Try: A.W. Jones 17' c Biggar 54' c Con: Biggar (2/2) 18', 55'; Pen: Biggar (3/4) 2', 32', 73'; Drop: Biggar (1/1) 77'

Millennium Stadium
Attendance: 62,338
Referee: Frank Murphy (IRFU)

== Judgement Day VII (2019) ==
=== Dragons vs Scarlets ===
27 April 2019
15:00

(1 BP) Dragons	34–32	Scarlets (2 BP)
Try: Screech (2) 47' c, 78' c Dixon 52' c Lewis 55' c Con: Lewis (3/3) 48', 54', 56'; Tovey (1/1) 78'; Pen: Lewis (2/2) 3', 14'	Report	Try: Nicholas 18' c McNicholl (2) 25' m, 63' c G. Davies 29' m Jo. Davies 60' m Con: Halfpenny (2/5) 19', 65'; Pen: Halfpenny (1/1) 72'; Drop: Patchell (0/1)

Millennium Stadium
Attendance: 51,297
Referee: Ben Whitehouse (WRU)

=== Cardiff Blues vs Ospreys ===
27 April 2019
17:15

(1 BP) Cardiff Blues	23–26	Ospreys
Try: Anscombe 5' c Turnbull 47' c Con: Anscombe (2/2) 6', 48'; Pen: Anscombe (3/3) 13', 36', 68'	Report	Try: Allen 29' c Smith 44' c Con: S. Davies (2/2) 30', 44'; Pen: S. Davies (4/4) 3', 22', 39', 79'; Drop: S. Davies (0/1)

Millennium Stadium
Attendance: 51,297
Referee: Nigel Owens (WRU)

== Judgement Day VIII (2020) ==
=== Dragons vs Scarlets ===
29 August 2020
17:15

Dragons	20–41	Scarlets (1 BP)
Try: Rosser 22' c Basham 40' m Warren 78' m Con: S. Davies (1/3); Pen: S. Davies (1/1) 12'	Report	Try: Lee 18' c St. Evans 26' c Ja. Davies 31' m McNicholl 55' c Rogers 66' m Blacker 70' c Con: D. Jones (4/6); Pen: D. Jones (1/1) 60'

Rodney Parade
Attendance: 0 (Note: Matches played behind closed doors due to the COVID-19 pandemic in Wales)
Referee: Craig Evans (WRU)

=== Cardiff Blues vs Ospreys ===
30 August 2020
17:00

Cardiff Blues	29–20	Ospreys
Try: Harries 17' c Adams 29' c Con: Tovey (2/2); Pen: Tovey (5/5)	Report	Try: D. Evans 34' c Morgan 80' c Con: Myler (1/1); Protheroe (1/1); Pen: Myler (2/2)

Rodney Parade
Attendance: 0
Referee: Adam Jones (WRU)

== Judgement Day 2023 ==
=== Dragons vs Scarlets ===
22 April 2023
15:00

(1 BP) Dragons	31–14	Scarlets
Try: Dee 3'; J. Williams 6'; Tomkinson 15'; Hughes 80'; Con: O'Brien (4/4) 4' 7' 16' 81'; Pen: O'Brien (1/1) 47'	Report	Try: Hardy 23'; Tuipulotu 69'; Con: Costelow (2/2) 23' 70'

Millennium Stadium
Attendance: 41,139
Referee: Jaco Peyper (SARU)

=== Ospreys vs Cardiff ===
22 April 2023
17:15

Ospreys	21–38	Cardiff (1 BP)
Try: Parry 45'; Thomas 62'; Lake 68'; Con: Anscombe (3/3) 46' 63' 68'	Report	Try: Young (2) 25' 58'; Llewellyn 29'; Grady 31'; Carré 75'; Con: Priestland (5/5) 25' 30' 32' 58' 77'; Pen: Priestland (1/1) 41'

Millennium Stadium
Attendance: 41,139
Referee: Frank Murphy (IRFU)

== Judgement Day 2024 ==
=== Scarlets vs Dragons ===
1 June 2024
15:00

(1 BP) Scarlets	32–15	Dragons
Try: Mathias 28'; Davies 37'; Lewis (2) 43', 53'; Con: Costelow (2) 29', 44'; Lloyd 39'; Pen: Costelow (2) 14', 73'	Report	Try: Tomkinson (2) 57', 68'; Con: Reed 69'; Pen: Reed 8'

Cardiff City Stadium
Attendance: 20,167
Referee: Craig Evans (Wales)

=== Cardiff vs Ospreys ===
1 June 2024
17:15

(2 BP) Cardiff	29–33	Ospreys (1 BP)
Try: Cabango 8'; Grady (2) 39', 80'; Hamer-Webb 68'; Con: de Beer 8'; Thomas (2) 69', 80+1'; Pen: Thomas 53'	Report	Try: Smith (2) 6', 48'; Tipuric 29'; Morgan 63'; Penalty try 76'; Con: Edwards (3) 7', 48', 64'

Cardiff City Stadium
Attendance: 20,167
Referee: Adam Jones (Wales)

== Judgement Day 2025 ==
The 2025 edition of the event was branded as Judgement Day X, despite being the 11th edition.

=== Ospreys vs Cardiff ===
19 April 2025
15:00

Ospreys	19–36	Cardiff (1 BP)
Try: Williams 10'; Spencer 59'; Hardy 75'; Con: Edwards (2) 10', 76'	Report	Try: Mann (2) 14', 34'; Hamer-Webb (3) 19', 28', 79'; Con: Sheedy 15'; Thomas 80'

Millennium Stadium
Attendance: 28,328
Referee: Ben Connor (Wales)

=== Dragons vs Scarlets ===
19 April 2025
17:30

Dragons	23–31	Scarlets (1 BP)
Try: Rosser (2) 25', 45'; Hewitt 41'; Con: O'Brien 42'; Pen: O'Brien (2) 39', 57'	Report	Try: Thomas 19'; Hepburn 49'; Fifita 54'; Murray 71'; Con: Lloyd (4) 20', 50', 55', 72'; Pen: Lloyd 80'

Millennium Stadium
Attendance: 28,328
Referee: Aimee Barrett-Theron (SARU)

== See also ==
- United Rugby Championship
- Welsh Rugby Union
- Wales national rugby union team
- 1872 Cup - Scottish derby
