= List of Ospreys (rugby union) players =

This is a list of rugby union footballers who have played for the Ospreys in the United Rugby Championship (and previous iterations the Celtic League, the Pro12, the Pro14 and Pro14 Rainbow Cup), the Celtic Cup, the European Rugby Champions Cup, the EPCR Challenge Cup and the Anglo-Welsh Cup. The list includes any player that has played in a regular season match, playoffs, semi-final or final for the Ospreys, listed alphabetically since the sides inception in 2003. Players who represented the Ospreys development sides in the British and Irish Cup or signed with the Ospreys but did not make an appearance are not included. Players listed in bold have represented the Wales national rugby union team, unless listed with the flag of their represented nation. Players listed in italics still represent the Ospreys as of the 2026–27 United Rugby Championship season.

== A ==
- Cory Allen: 34 appearances (Debut 2017)
- Morgan Allen: 53 appearances (Debut 2011)
- Gareth Anscombe: 19 appearances (Debut 2021)
- (Canada) Tyler Ardron: 64 appearances (Debut 2013)
- (Moldova) Dmitri Arhip: 91 appearances (Debut 2021)
- Lloyd Ashley (Note: Lloyd Ashley was known as Lloyd Peers up until 2015.): 153 appearances (Debut 2011)
- Matthew Aubrey: 39 appearances (Debut 2016)
- Wills Austin (Note: Austin joined the Ospreys on short-term loan from the Sale Sharks in 2025. A former Wales U20 cap he attended Swansea University where he represented their BUCS side, combining his studies with being a member of the Sale academy. The hooker would return to Sale following the end of his loan, before joining the Dragons on a similar loan the following season.): 1 appearance (Debut 2025)

== B ==
- Dan Baker: 94 appearances (Debut 2013)
- Jay Baker: 11 appearances (Debut 2016)
- Scott Baldwin: 183 appearances (Debut 2009)
- Lyndon Bateman (Note: Lock Bateman was a member of the inaugural Ospreys squad in 2003/04. Having previously played for Neath he would represent the Ospreys for seven seasons before retiring through injury in 2010. He also played club rugby for Aberavon.): 79 appearances (Debut 2003)
- James Bater: 67 appearances (Debut 2003)
- Lee Beach: 27 appearances (Debut 2004)
- Adam Beard: 141 appearances (Debut 2014)
- Joe Bearman: 101 appearances (Debut 2011)
- Ashley Beck: 137 appearances (Debut 2007)
- Huw Bennett: 142 appearances (Debut 2003)
- Rynier Bernardo: 31 appearances (Debut 2014)
- Leigh Bevan (Note: Wing/Fullback Bevan, a strong goal-kicker, played his club rugby for Bonymaen. He made two league appearances for the Ospreys before departing in 2009.): 2 appearances (Debut 2008)
- Ryan Bevington: 112 appearances (Debut 2008)
- Dan Biggar: 221 appearances (Debut 2008)
- Andrew Bishop: 209 appearances (Debut 2005)
- David Bishop: 28 appearances (Debut 2004)
- Ifereimi Boladau: 4 appearances (Debut 2014)
- Nathan Bonner-Evans: 34 appearances (Debut 2003)
- Evardi Boshoff: 41 appearances (Debut 2024)
- Tom Botha: 166 appearances (Debut 2018)
- (Ireland) Tommy Bowe: 77 appearances (Debut 2008)
- Matthew Brayley (Note: A former Wales U21 captain, Brayley played his club rugby for Swansea before later joining Llanelli. A centre, he appeared in both the league and Heineken Cup for the Ospreys.): 4 appearances (Debut 2004)
- Marc Breeze: 4 appearances (Debut 2008)
- Aled Brew: 24 appearances (Debut 2004)
- Lee Byrne: 92 appearances (Debut 2006)

== C ==
- Callum Carson: 3 appearances (Debut 2018)
- (New Zealand) Adrian Cashmore: 11 appearances (Debut 2005)
- (Fiji) Tevita Cavubati: 5 appearances (Debut 2015)
- Andrew Clatworthy (Note: A prop, Clatworthy played club rugby for Aberavon and Swansea. He made his appearances for the Ospreys in their inaugural season in 2003/04.): 3 appearances (Debut 2003)
- Brent Cockbain: 53 appearances (Debut 2004)
- Phil Cokanasiga: 20 appearances (Debut 2024)
- Jake Cole (Note: Scrum-half/Wing Cole made a singular appearance for the Ospreys in the Anglo-Welsh Cup. He played his club rugby for Neath. He is the elder brother of Josh Cole.): 1 appearance (Debut 2013)
- Josh Cole (Note: Flanker Cole made his two appearances for the Ospreys in the Anglo-Welsh Cup. He played his club rugby for Neath before later joining Bargoed. He is the younger brother of Jake Cole.): 2 appearances (Debut 2018)
- Jordan Collier: 2 appearances (Debut 2014)
- (New Zealand) Jerry Collins: 56 appearances (Debut 2009)
- Michael Collins: 2 appearances (Debut 2007)
- Michael Collins: 37 appearances (Debut 2021)
- Ryan Conbeer: 11 appearances (Debut 2024)
- Shaun Connor: 101 appearances (Debut 2003)
- Tom Cowan-Dickie: 2 appearances (Debut 2023)
- Olly Cracknell: 117 appearances (Debut 2015)
- Lawson Creighton: 5 appearances (Debut 2026)
- Craig Cross (Note: Formerly of the Scarlets academy, where he made two appearances, Llandovery prop Cross signed for the Ospreys in 2010. After leaving the side, he returned to Llandovery.): 5 appearances (Debut 2011)
- Dewi Cross: 10 appearances (Debut 2018)
- Sam Cross: 68 appearances (Debut 2017)
- Alex Cuthbert: 18 appearances (Debut 2021)

== D ==
- Efan Daniel: 14 appearances (Debut 2025)
- Aled Davies: 27 appearances (Debut 2018)
- Alun Wyn Davies: 1 appearance (Debut 2003)
- Barry Davies: 30 appearances (Debut 2009)
- Bradley Davies: 84 appearances (Debut 2016)
- Leigh Davies: 14 appearances (Debut 2005)
- Liam Davies: 4 appearances (Debut 2009)
- Luke Davies: 37 appearances (Debut 2023)
- Mefin Davies: 33 appearances (Debut 2004)
- **Rhys Davies**: 90 appearances (Debut 2020)
- Ross Davies: 2 appearances (Debut 2009)
- Sam Davies: 150 appearances (Debut 2012)
- Tristan Davies: 13 appearances (Debut 2022)
- **Harri Deaves**: 65 appearances (Debut 2022)
- Gareth Delve: 2 appearances (Debut 2015)
- Marco de Witt (Note: A Currie Cup winner with the Griquas in 2025, flanker de Witt joined the Ospreys on a short-term deal in the 2025/26 season. He represented Western Province and the Bulls in South Africa at junior level before joining the Sharks, who he represented in the Currie Cup and a single appearance in the United Rugby Championship, prior to joining the Griquas.): 2 appearances (Debut 2026)
- Des Dillon: 7 appearances (Debut 2005)
- Hanno Dirksen: 154 appearances (Debut 2009)
- Harri Doel: 1 appearance (Debut 2023)
- Ken Dowding (Note: Dowding made a singular appearance for the Ospreys in the Pro12. A member of the British Army, he joined the Ospreys while also appearing for Bridgend Ravens. The English-born prop would go on to play for Bath and London Irish before going into coaching.): 1 appearance (Debut 2011)
- Rob Dudley-Jones (Note: A former Wales U20 cap, flanker Dudley-Jones played his club rugby for Aberavon, Swansea and Bridgend Ravens. He made his singular appearance for the Ospreys in the Anglo-Welsh Cup, while he also played in England for Esher.): 1 appearance (Debut 2014)
- Adrian Durston: 42 appearances (Debut 2003)
- Matthew Dwyer: 23 appearances (Debut 2011)

== E ==
- **Dan Edwards**: 53 appearances (Debut 2023)
- Lewis Edwards (Note: Current Ospreys fullback Edwards came through the Ospreys academy and represented Wales U20 in 2024 and 2025. He debuted for the Ospreys aged 19 in the EPCR Challenge Cup. He plays his club rugby for Swansea.): 1 appearance (Debut 2026)
- Nathan Edwards (Note: A former Wales U20 cap, Edwards, a centre, predominately played his club rugby for Bridgend Ravens, but also represented Newport and Llanelli. He made his appearances for the Ospreys in the Anglo-Welsh Cup.): 3 appearances (Debut 2012)
- Arthur Ellis: 8 appearances (Debut 2012)
- (South Africa) JJ Engelbrecht: 4 appearances (Debut 2016)
- Ashley Evans (Note: A former Wales U20 cap, Evans predominately played rugby sevens, representing the Wales Sevens side at five tournaments in 2013. He would make his appearances for the Ospreys in the Anglo-Welsh Cup, before representing the Scarlets in the same competition two seasons later.): 2 appearances (Debut 2014)
- Cai Evans: 34 appearances (Debut 2017)
- Dan Evans: 173 appearances (Debut 2014)
- David Evans: 1 appearance (Debut 2009)
- Gareth Evans: 16 appearances (Debut 2019)
- Gwilym Evans: 9 appearances (Debut 2025)
- Ian Evans: 129 appearances (Debut 2005)
- Lloyd Evans: 4 appearances (Debut 2014)
- Tim Evans (Note: Prop Evans joined the Ospreys from club side Swansea. His spell with the side was injury hit, before he returned to club rugby with Swansea.): 4 appearances (Debut 2004)

== F ==
- Rhys Fawcett: 3 appearances (Debut 2019)
- James Fender: 42 appearances (Debut 2022)
- (Tonga) Maʻafu Fia: 105 appearances (Debut 2015)
- Dai Flanagan: 5 appearances (Debut 2010)
- Tom Florence: 10 appearances (Debut 2022)
- (Australia) **Lalakai Foketi**: 4 appearances (Debut 2026)
- Cormac Foley: 2 appearances (Debut 2026)
- (Samoa) Kieron Fonotia: 41 appearances (Debut 2016)
- (Samoa) Kahn Fotuali'i: 47 appearances (Debut 2011)
- Tomas Francis: 27 appearances (Debut 2021)
- (United States) Toby Fricker: 1 appearance (Debut 2023)
- Richard Fussell: 113 appearances (Debut 2010)

== G ==
- (Romania) Gheorghe Gajion: 13 appearances (Debut 2018)
- Simon Gardiner: 5 appearances (Debut 2019)
- Rhys Garfield (Note: Garfield made a singular appearance for the Ospreys in the Pro12. A lock he would later play for Pontycymmer. In 2007, he was jailed for stamping on the head of an opposition rugby player.): 1 appearance (Debut 2008)
- Joe Gatt (Note: Gatt joined the Ospreys from the Bridgend Ravens and made his singular appearance in the Anglo-Welsh Cup. A centre, Gatt returned to Bridgend after leaving the Ospreys and also appeared at club level for Cardiff.): 1 appearance (Debut 2018)
- Dan Gemine (Note: Lock/Flanker Gemine was a member of the Ospreys academy while playing his club rugby for Llandovery. A Wales U20 cap in 2025, he made a singular appearance in 2024. The following season he would represent the Scarlets.): 1 appearance (Debut 2024)
- Scott Gibbs: 16 appearances (Debut 2003)
- **Keelan Giles**: 132 appearances (Debut 2016)
- Todd Gleave: 1 appearance (Debut 2021)
- Ben Glynn: 1 appearance (Debut 2019)
- James Goode: 15 appearances (Debut 2009)
- Ian Gough: 119 appearances (Debut 2007)
- Tom Grabham: 50 appearances (Debut 2011)
- Will Greatbanks: 7 appearances (Debut 2024)
- Cai Griffiths: 132 appearances (Debut 2003)
- Will Griffiths: 56 appearances (Debut 2018)
- Hugh Gustafson: 8 appearances (Debut 2016)

== H ==
- Tom Habberfield: 135 appearances (Debut 2011)
- **Kieran Hardy**: 37 appearances (Debut 2024)
- (Canada) Jeff Hassler: 74 appearances (Debut 2013)
- Joe Hawkins: 28 appearances (Debut 2020)
- Rhys Henry: 60 appearances (Debut 2021)
- Gavin Henson: 98 appearances (Debut 2003)
- Richard Hibbard: 175 appearances (Debut 2004)
- Will Hickey: 6 appearances (Debut 2022)
- Kian Hire: 9 appearances (Debut 2025)
- (New Zealand) Marty Holah: 93 appearances (Debut 2007)
- James Hook: 149 appearances (Debut 2004)
- Iestyn Hopkins: 55 appearances (Debut 2023)
- Pat Horgan (Note: Horgan made a singular appearance in the Ospreys inaugural season in 2003. Having previously represented Llanelli, it was at Neath where he was most well known. The scrum-half would make over 200 appearances for Neath before coaching the side. He would later coach the Wales U20 side.): 1 appearance (Debut 2003)
- Harri Houston: 9 appearances (Debut 2023)
- **Dafydd Howells** 42 appearances (Debut 2013)
- Rhodri Hughes: 10 appearances (Debut 2012)
- Rhys Hutcherson (Note: Hutcherson made his appearances for the Ospreys in the Anglo-Welsh Cup. A hooker, he played his club rugby for Bedwas.): 2 appearances (Debut 2013)

== I ==
- Math Iorwerth-Scott (Note: Current Ospreys prop Iorwerth-Scott joined the Ospreys from the Bridgend Ravens and has been a member of the development side since the summer of 2024. He was formerly a student at Cardiff Metropolitan University where he represented their BUCS side.): 3 appearances (Debut 2024)
- Tom Isaacs: 66 appearances (Debut 2010)

== J ==
- Steff Jac Jones (Note: Current Ospreys fly-half Jac Jones debuted against Cardiff. Formerly a member of the Scarlets academy who he joined after attending Hartpury College, he joined the Ospreys ahead of the 2026/27 season. He played his club rugby for Llandovery before joining Aberavon. He represented Wales U20 in 2026.): 1 appearance (Debut 2026)
- Paul James: 232 appearances (Debut 2003)
- (South Africa) Ricky Januarie: 6 appearances (Debut 2009)
- Aaron Jarvis: 91 appearances (Debut 2011)
- Matthew Jarvis: 5 appearances (Debut 2008)
- Alex Jeffries: 18 appearances (Debut 2017)
- Aled Jenkins: 3 appearances (Debut 2014)
- Matthew Jenkins (Note: Jenkins began his club career at Aberavon as a number 8, before converting to centre while with the Ospreys. He made his appearances in the Anglo-Welsh Cup before returning to Aberavon. He would later join the Scarlets, but did not make an appearance, instead playing for club side Llanelli. He would later return to Aberavon, before joining Neath.): 3 appearances (Debut 2013)
- Rowan Jenkins: 13 appearances (Debut 2016)
- Ben John: 79 appearances (Debut 2010)
- (New Zealand) Campbell Johnstone: 5 appearances (Debut 2012)
- Adam Jones: 195 appearances (Debut 2003)
- Alun Wyn Jones: 268 appearances (Debut 2005)
- Cameron Jones: 3 appearances (Debut 2024)
- Cameron Jones: 15 appearances (Debut 2024)
- Duncan Jones: 223 appearances (Debut 2004)
- Ieuan Jones: 6 appearances (Debut 2014)
- Jack Jones (Note: A former Wales U20 cap, Jones signed for the Ospreys from club side Swansea. After a loan spell at Italian club Rugby Rovigo Delta, Jones would appear for the Ospreys in the Anglo-Welsh Cup. After a spell in France playing for Carqueiranne-Hyères, he would return to Wales to join the Scarlets.): 2 appearances (Debut 2013)
- Lewis Jones: 16 appearances (Debut 2023)
- Matt Jones: 47 appearances (Debut 2004)
- Paul Jones (Note: A prop, Jones made two appearances in the Ospreys inaugural season.): 2 appearances (Debut 2003)
- Phil Jones (Note: A former Wales U20 cap, Jones played his club rugby for Swansea. Predominantly a fly-half, but comfortable playing across the backline, Jones made his appearances for the Ospreys in the Anglo-Welsh Cup. After leaving the side, he would represent the Wales Sevens side in five tournaments in 2017.): 2 appearances (Debut 2016)
- Rhodri Jones: 87 appearances (Debut 2016)
- Ross Jones: 21 appearances (Debut 2011)
- Ryan Jones: 150 appearances (Debut 2004)
- Will Jones: 15 appearances (Debut 2017)

== K ==
- Damian Karauna: 10 appearances (Debut 2005)
- Daniel Kasende: 37 appearances (Debut 2023)
- Richard Kelly: 6 appearances (Debut 2009)
- James King: 203 appearances (Debut 2009)
- (Namibia) Lesley Klim: 6 appearances (Debut 2019)
- Graham Knoop: 4 appearances (Debut 2013)
- Tavis Knoyle: 1 appearance (Debut 2009)
- (Australia) **Marika Koroibete**: 1 appearance (Debut 2026)
- Johnny Kôtze: 4 appearances (Debut 2018)
- Rewan Kruger: 2 appearances (Debut 2023)

== L ==
- Dewi Lake: 76 appearances (Debut 2018)
- (Samoa) Jordan Lay: 5 appearances (Debut 2019)
- (New Zealand) Brendon Leonard: 45 appearances (Debut 2015)
- (Samoa) Filipo Levi: 8 appearances (Debut 2009)
- Ben Lewis: 24 appearances (Debut 2007)
- Ethan Lewis: 13 appearances (Debut 2023)
- Sam Lewis: 65 appearances (Debut 2011)
- Gareth Llewellyn: 6 appearances (Debut 2003)
- Andy Lloyd: 86 appearances (Debut 2004)
- Lewis Lloyd: 36 appearances (Debut 2023)
- Daniel Lloyd-Jones (Note: Lock Lloyd-Jones made a singular appearance for the Ospreys in 2007. He played his club rugby for Swansea.): 1 appearance (Debut 2007)
- Dan Lydiate: 90 appearances (Debut 2014)

== M ==
- Paul Mackey (Note: A centre, Mackay made a singular appearance for the Ospreys, before joining Swansea at club level. He would later sign professionally for the Scarlets, before joining London Welsh in the RFU Championship.): 1 appearance (Debut 2005)
- (Scotland) Darryl Marfo: 3 appearances (Debut 2020)
- (New Zealand) Justin Marshall: 49 appearances (Debut 2006)
- Chris Martenko (Note: A former Wales U21 cap, Martenko played club rugby for Pontypridd before joining the Ospreys on a development contract. He was forced to retire professionally through injury, aged 24, in June 2007, before returning to club rugby with Pontypridd.): 2 appearances (Debut 2007)
- Kieran Martin (Note: A lock, Martin represented the Ospreys in the Anglo-Welsh Cup. He played his club rugby for both the Bridgend Ravens and Cardiff.): 2 appearances (Debut 2018)
- (Fiji) Josh Matavesi: 79 appearances (Debut 2014)
- Rob McCusker: 36 appearances (Debut 2016)
- George McGuigan: 4 appearances (Debut 2025)
- Conor McInerney (Note: A former Ireland U20 cap, McInerney joined the Ospreys from Leinster's academy in 2009. After appearances at lock over two seasons, he would be forced to retire through injury in April 2011.): 5 appearances (Debut 2010)
- Marty McKenzie: 5 appearances (Debut 2019)
- Guy Mercer: 16 appearances (Debut 2017)
- Andrew Millward: 94 appearances (Debut 2003)
- Craig Mitchell: 35 appearances (Debut 2006)
- Chris Moore (Note: English-born with Irish ancestry, Moore joined the Ospreys on a short-term loan from Irish side Munster. A hooker, he attended Exeter University where he played for their BUCS side and represented Ireland at U18 level, he would return to Munster at the end of his loan before subsequently representing Chinnor in Champ Rugby.): 1 appearance (Debut 2024)
- Harri Morgan: 9 appearances (Debut 2018)
- Jac Morgan: 58 appearances (Debut 2021)
- **Luke Morgan**: 119 appearances (Debut 2012)
- Matthew Morgan: 66 appearances (Debut 2010)
- **Reuben Morgan-Williams**: 138 appearances (Debut 2017)
- **Ross Moriarty**: 23 appearances (Debut 2025)
- Morgan Morris: 131 appearances (Debut 2017)
- Dom Morris: 2 appearances (Debut 2023)
- Gareth Morris (Note: Formerly of Neath, winger Morris represented the Ospreys in their inaugural season before returning to Neath. He would later play professionally for the Scarlets before joining Tonmawr at club level.): 12 appearances (Debut 2003)
- **Morgan Morse**: 44 appearances (Debut 2023)
- Dylan Moss: 1 appearance (Debut 2018)
- (South Africa) Brian Mujati: 7 appearances (Debut 2017)
- (Germany) Jamie Murphy: 3 appearances (Debut 2013)
- Richard Mustoe: 49 appearances (Debut 2004)
- (England) Stephen Myler: 31 appearances (Debut 2020)

== N ==
- Max Nagy: 59 appearances (Debut 2021)
- (Fiji) Aisea Natoga: 33 appearances (Debut 2013)
- (Georgia (country)) Giorgi Nemsadze: 5 appearances (Debut 2018)
- Andy Newman: 75 appearances (Debut 2003)
- George North: 49 appearances (Debut 2018)
- Jamie Nutbrown: 50 appearances (Debut 2008)

== O ==
- Tom O'Flaherty: 5 appearances (Debut 2016)
- (Canada) Chauncey O'Toole: 5 appearances (Debut 2011)
- (South Africa) Marvin Orie: 7 appearances (Debut 2019)
- Scott Otten: 110 appearances (Debut 2014)
- Gareth Owen: 50 appearances (Debut 2007)

== P ==
- Perry Parker: 3 appearances (Debut 2014)
- Sonny Parker: 157 appearances (Debut 2004)
- **Sam Parry**: 190 appearances (Debut 2014)
- Garyn Phillips: 53 appearances (Debut 2021)
- Ifan Phillips: 40 appearances (Debut 2017)
- Kristian Phillips: 22 appearances (Debut 2008)
- Mike Phillips: 60 appearances (Debut 2007)
- Rory Pitman: 1 appearance (Debut 2012)
- Mike Powell: 22 appearances (Debut 2006)
- Luke Price: 53 appearances (Debut 2014)
- Will Price (Note: Predominantly a rugby sevens player, Price represented the Wales Sevens side at 17 tournaments between 2010 and 2013. A wing in the 15-aside game, he made his appearances in the Anglo-Welsh Cup.): 4 appearances (Debut 2011)
- Mat Protheroe: 43 appearances (Debut 2020)
- Tom Prydie: 12 appearances (Debut 2009)
- Richie Pugh: 78 appearances (Debut 2003)

== R ==
- **James Ratti**: 69 appearances (Debut 2016)
- Joe Rees: 31 appearances (Debut 2010)
- Richie Rees: 11 appearances (Debut 2004)
- Jack Regan: 11 appearances (Debut 2021)
- Ben Roberts (Note: A lock, Roberts played his club rugby for Swansea before making his Ospreys debut in 2026. He had previously attended Cardiff University and represented their BUCS side, having previously only played rugby at school in London.): 2 appearances (Debut 2026)
- Martin Roberts: 48 appearances (Debut 2005)
- **Tom Rogers**: 4 appearances (Debut 2026)
- (England) Ethan Roots: 37 appearances (Debut 2021)
- Jeandré Rudolph: 3 appearances (Debut 2024)

== S ==
- Luke Scully: 12 appearances (Debut 2022)
- Victor Sekekete: 7 appearances (Debut 2024)
- Tal Selley: 13 appearances (Debut 2006)
- (Samoa) Elvis Seveali'i: 42 appearances (Debut 2003)
- Ed Shervington: 38 appearances (Debut 2006)
- Tom Sloane (Note: A prop, Sloane played his club rugby for Swansea before making his singular appearance for the Ospreys. He has since remained with the Ospreys in a backroom staff role.): 1 appearance (Debut 2015)
- Ryan Smith: 21 appearances (Debut 2025)
- Tom Smith: 94 appearances (Debut 2007)
- Nicky Smith: 191 appearances (Debut 2013)
- Will Spencer: 10 appearances (Debut 2024)
- Jason Spice: 78 appearances (Debut 2004)
- Tommy Spinks: 2 appearances (Debut 2014)
- Jonathan Spratt: 102 appearances (Debut 2006)
- De Kock Steenkamp: 2 appearances (Debut 2015)
- James Storey (Note: English born with Irish ancestry, Storey became Welsh qualified while representing Neath professionally before joining the Ospreys for their inaugural season in 2003/04, having previously represented London Welsh. Ahead of 2004/05 he joined Munster in Ireland, before transferring to London Irish the following year. He played both centre and wing and represented England at U16 and U21 level.): 21 appearances (Debut 2003)
- (Samoa) George Stowers: 29 appearances (Debut 2011)
- Dan Suter: 33 appearances (Debut 2013)
- Huw Sutton: 49 appearances (Debut 2022)

== T ==
- (Tonga) Elvis Taione: 16 appearances (Debut 2021)
- (Canada) Luke Tait: 26 appearances (Debut 2003)
- Steve Tandy: 102 appearances (Debut 2003)
- Mark Taylor: 17 appearances (Debut 2007)
- Will Taylor: 3 appearances (Debut 2011)
- (Italy) Tito Tebaldi: 19 appearances (Debut 2013)
- (South Africa) Stefan Terblanche: 86 appearances (Debut 2003)
- Adrian Thomas (Note: A centre, Thomas made two appearances in the Pro12. He did not appear for another side professionally.): 2 appearances (Debut 2008)
- Ben Thomas (Note: A former Wales U20 cap, Thomas made a singular appearance in the Anglo-Welsh Cup. He has since played club rugby in England.): 1 appearance (Debut 2011)
- **Gareth Thomas**: 156 appearances (Debut 2014)
- Gavin Thomas: 15 appearances (Debut 2003)
- Joe Thomas: 16 appearances (Debut 2015)
- Jonathan Thomas: 188 appearances (Debut 2003)
- Jonny Thomas (Note: A prop, Thomas made a singular appearance in the Anglo-Welsh Cup.): 1 appearance (Debut 2012)
- Josh Thomas: 17 appearances (Debut 2020)
- Marc Thomas: 40 appearances (Debut 2012)
- Nicky Thomas (Note: A wing or fullback, Thomas played his club rugby for Swansea. One of his appearances for the Ospreys was in the Pro12.): 3 appearances (Debut 2009)
- Nicky Thomas: 7 appearances (Debut 2012)
- Rhys Thomas (Note: A former Wales U20 cap, Thomas came through the Ospreys academy, signing a development contract in 2019. Having represented Coventry in the RFU Championship for two seasons, he debuted for the Ospreys in 2024. He plays his club rugby for Aberavon.): 1 appearance (Debut 2024)
- Steffan Thomas: 32 appearances (Debut 2024)
- Tiaan Thomas-Wheeler: 58 appearances (Debut 2018)
- Rory Thornton: 59 appearances (Debut 2014)
- (New Zealand) Filo Tiatia: 99 appearances (Debut 2006)
- Justin Tipuric: 229 appearances (Debut 2009)
- (Tonga) Dave Tiueti: 38 appearances (Debut 2003)
- Joe Tomalin-Reeves (Note: A flanker, Tomalin-Reeves' two appearances were in the Anglo-Welsh Cup. He played his club rugby for Aberavon.): 2 appearances (Debut 2016)
- (Tonga) Hale T-Pole: 8 appearances (Debut 2007)

== U ==
- (England) Sam Underhill: 37 appearances (Debut 2015)

== V ==
- (South Africa) Marnus van der Merwe: 1 appearance (Debut 2023)
- Jonny Vaughton: 63 appearances (Debut 2005)
- Shaun Venter: 23 appearances (Debut 2019)
- Guido Volpi: 7 appearances (Debut 2018)

== W ==
- Eli Walker: 81 appearances (Debut 2010)
- (Scotland) Nikki Walker: 103 appearances (Debut 2006)
- Jack Walsh: 80 appearances (Debut 2022)
- Ben Warren: 49 appearances (Debut 2022)
- Stefan Watermeyer: 2 appearances (Debut 2012)
- **Owen Watkin**: 140 appearances (Debut 2015)
- Rhys Webb: 200 appearances (Debut 2008)
- Chris Wells (Note: Previously professional for Swansea who he represented in the Heineken Cup, Wells represented the Ospreys in their inaugural season. He retired professionally after the 2003/04 season.): 11 appearances (Debut 2003)
- Rhodri Wells (Note: Wells was a member of the inaugural Ospreys squad, and played for the side over the next seven seasons. A scrum-half, he played his club rugby for Swansea. He did not play professionally for any other sides.): 23 appearances (Debut 2003)
- Harri Wilde: 3 appearances (Debut 2026)
- Andy Williams: 34 appearances (Debut 2003)
- Barry Williams: 101 appearances (Debut 2003)
- Harri Williams: 2 appearances (Debut 2026)
- Jay Williams (Note: Williams made a single appearance for the Ospreys in the Anglo-Welsh Cup. A lock, he played his club rugby for Swansea.): 1 appearance (Debut 2017)
- **Keiran Williams**: 111 appearances (Debut 2016)
- Owen Williams (Note: A prop, Williams made two appearances for the Ospreys, once in the Pro12. He did not play professional for any other side.): 2 appearances (Debut 2012)
- Owen Williams: 41 appearances (Debut 2022)
- Rhys Williams (Note: Williams represented the Ospreys in the Anglo-Welsh Cup. A centre, he played club rugbty for Carmarthen Quins, Swansea and Bridgend Ravens while also playing in France.): 2 appearances (Debut 2017)
- Sam Williams (Note: Williams signed professionally for the Ospreys ahead of the 2013/14 season. A lock, he played his club rugby for Aberavon. He did not play professionally for another side.): 6 appearances (Debut 2012)
- Scott Williams: 27 appearances (Debut 2018)
- Shane Williams: 141 appearances (Debut 2003)
- Tom Williams: 19 appearances (Debut 2017)
- (Australia) **Liam Wright**: 5 appearances (Debut 2026)

== Y ==
- Evan Yardley: 1 appearance (Debut 2013)
