= Nathan Buck (rugby union) =

- Born: Nathan Buck; 17 August 1989 (age 37) Abergavenny, Wales
- Height: 1.90 m (6 ft 3 in)
- Weight: 124 kg (19 st 7 lb)

Rugby union career
- Current team: Newport Gwent Dragons
Senior career
Years	Team	Apps	(Points)
2010–14	NG Dragons	56	(0)
2015-16	Ealing Trailfinders	11	(2)
- Correct as of 29 October 2011

Nathan Buck (born 17 August 1989) is a Welsh rugby union player who played for Newport Gwent Dragons having previously played for Pontypool United and Cross Keys. His position is tight head prop.

Buck moved to Ealing Trailfinders 2014–15.
