= Lewis Jones (rugby union, born 1992) =

Welsh rugby union footballer

- Born: Lewis Jones; 24 November 1992 (age 33) Beddau, Wales
- Height: 173 cm (5 ft 8 in)
- Weight: 81 kg (12 st 11 lb; 179 lb)

Rugby union career
- Position: Scrum-half
- Current team: Dragons
Senior career
Years	Team	Apps	(Points)
2011–2021	Cardiff Blues	127	(82)
2021–2024	Dragons RFC	27	(15)
2025-2026	Beddau RFC	23	(0)
- Correct as of 11:46, 6 February 2024 (UTC)
International career
Years	Team	Apps	(Points)
–	Wales U20	9	(5)
- Correct as of 6 November 2022
National sevens team
Years	Team		Comps
2015	Wales Sevens		2

Lewis Jones (born 24 November 1992) is a Welsh rugby union player.

Beddau born and bred scrum half Lewis Jones spent his early days playing for his school and for his local club at junior and youth level. He is also a former professional.

While studying at Ysgol Gyfun Rhydfelen, Jones was called up to the Cardiff Blues Age Grade squads from Under-16s through to Under-18 level, and was given a placement with Pontypridd RFC at the commencement of the 2010/11 campaign. During this time he also picked up representative honours for Wales.

Whilst studying at Pencoed College, Jones also joined the Bridgend WRU College League side on occasion during his two years in sixth-form. Released by the Blues Academy in November 2010, Jones was offered a permanent contract with Pontypridd.

He went on to play a significant part in the club's successful campaign, culminating in a man-of-the-match performance in the 2011 SWALEC Cup final.

After an impressive season in the Principality Premiership and a key component in Wales' under 20 squad, Jones was invited back into the academy a year later, before signing with the Cardiff Blues senior side for the 2012/13 season.

Jones made his European debut against Sale Sharks in 2012 and made history in 2013 when he became the youngest player to reach 50 caps for the Cardiff Blues.

In 2021, Jones joined the Dragons, initially as a loan before signing a full contract.
