= Dan Way =

English rugby union player

- Born: Dan Way; 5 April 1987 (age 39) Swindon, England
- Height: 183 cm (6 ft 0 in)
- Weight: 118 kg (18 st 8 lb)

Rugby union career
Senior career
Years	Team	Apps	(Points)
2010–15	Newport GD	62	(0)

Dan Way (born 5 April 1987, Swindon) is an English former rugby union player for Newport RFC and the Newport Gwent Dragons regional team. He previously played for Pontypool RFC and Ebbw Vale RFC. A prop forward, Way made his debut for Newport Gwent Dragons against Gloucester 4 November 2010. Way retired from rugby in July 2015 due to a recurring shoulder injury.
