= Jevon Groves =

Welsh rugby union player

- Born: Jevon Groves; 3 April 1988 (age 38) Pontypridd, Wales
- Height: 1.93 m (6 ft 4 in)
- Weight: 106 kg (234 lb)
- School: Y Pant School
- University: Glamorgan University and Newport University

Rugby union career
Senior career
Years	Team	Apps	(Points)
2010–2014	NG Dragons	46	(20)
National sevens team
Years	Team		Comps
2010–2011	Wales		
Coaching career
- Years: Team
- 2023–present: Hong Kong 7s

Jevon Groves (born 3 April 1988) is a rugby union player. His usual position is back row forward.

He played for Cardiff RFC, Glamorgan Wanderers RFC and Cross Keys RFC.

Groves made his debut for Newport Gwent Dragons against the Ospreys 7 May 2010 as a second-half replacement. Groves was offered a new contract by Newport Gwent Dragons in May 2014 but chose to move on.

In the 2016–17 season, he joined Hong Kong Football Club (rugby section), playing in the Hong Kong Premiership.

== International ==
He is a Wales Under 19 and Under 20 international. Groves captained the Wales Sevens team for the 2010 Commonwealth Games rugby sevens tournament.
