= Dmitri Arhip =

Moldovan rugby union player (born 1988)

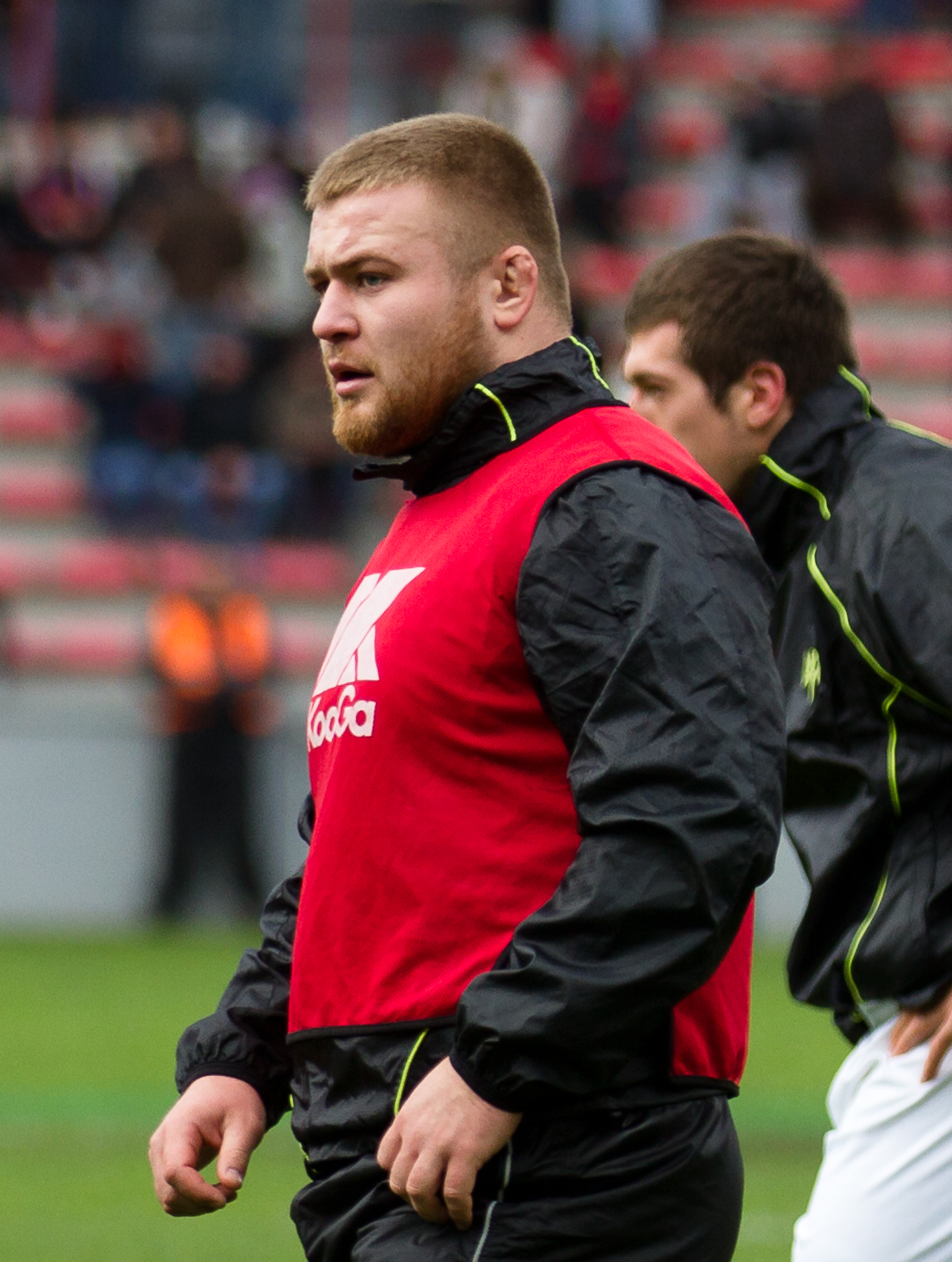
- Arhip at the 2012–13 Heineken Cup in a match between Toulouse and Ospreys.
- Born: Dmitri Arhip; 12 November 1988 (age 38) Camenca, Moldova
- Height: 182 cm (6 ft 0 in)
- Weight: 120 kg (18 st 13 lb; 265 lb)

Rugby union career
- Position: Tighthead Prop
- Current team: Dragons RFC
Youth career
- 19??-2003: Kishniev Blue Marine
- 2003-2006: CS Dinamo București
Senior career
Years	Team	Apps	(Points)
2006-2009	CS Dinamo București		
2009-2012	Enisei-STM		
2012-2018	Ospreys	91	(20)
2012-2013	→ Bridgend Ravens (loan)	2	(0)
2018-2023	Cardiff Rugby	70	(0)
2023-	Dragons RFC	9	(0)
- Correct as of 14 April 2025
International career
Years	Team	Apps	(Points)
2010–2015	Moldova	20	(20)
- Correct as of 14 April 2025

Dmitri Arhip (born 12 November 1988) is a Moldovan rugby union player who plays for the Dragons RFC at Tighthead Prop. He is also a Moldovan international.

== Career ==
=== Early years ===
Born in Camenca, Moldova he joined Kishniev Blue Marine, at 15 years old he moved to Romania to join Dinamo București, winning back to back national titles in 2006-07 and 2007-08.

He went on to join Enisei-STM in the Russian Rugby Championship, winning two league titles in 2011 and 2012. Enisei-STM travelled to Ireland in 2012 for pre-season friendly against Connacht where Arhip was spotted by Swansea based side Ospreys.

=== Wales career ===
==== Ospreys ====
He signed as injury cover in the 2012-13 season for the Ospreys, as well as featuring twice for Bridgend Ravens. He scored his first try for the Ospreys in his first season in a clash against Newport Gwent Dragons. On New Years Day, 2016, Arhip won his 50th cap for the Ospreys against Newport Gwent Dragons.

==== Cardiff ====
After 5 seasons with the Ospreys, he was set to leave to join Montpellier in the Top 14 on a €500,000 a year deal, however the deal fell through, Arhip was snapped up by Cardiff Rugby. Making his debut in the first round of the 2018-19 Pro 14 against Leinster. In February 2023, while playing against Benetton Arhip injured his Achilles, putting an end to his season. His contract ended in June 2023, with him injured he was unable to train and spent 8 months without a wage.

==== Dragons ====
He began training on trial at Dragons RFC to help with his rehabilitation, he was signed as a short-term deal as injury cover in March 2024. The tight-head made his debut soon after at home against Zebre in a 20-13 win at Rodney Parade, making a total of five appearances before the end of the season. Arhip was given a new deal ahead of the 2024/25 season.

== Honours ==
=== CS Dinamo București ===
- Liga Națională de Rugby
  - Champions: (2) 2006-07, 2007-08

=== Enisei-STM ===
- Russian Rugby Championship
  - Champions: (2) 2011, 2012
  - Runners-up: (2) 2009, 2010
