= Ben John =

Wales international rugby union footballer

- Born: Ben John; 28 February 1991 (age 35) Morriston, Swansea, Wales
- Height: 1.95 m (6 ft 5 in)
- Weight: 99 kg (15 st 8 lb)

Rugby union career
- Position: Centre
Amateur team(s)
Years	Team	Apps	(Points)
- Aberavon
Senior career
Years	Team	Apps	(Points)
2010–2019	Ospreys	79	(75)
2014–2015	→ Dragons (loan)	3	(0)
International career
Years	Team	Apps	(Points)
2010–2011	Wales U20	9	(10)

Ben John (born 28 February 1991) is a retired Welsh rugby union player. A centre, he played club rugby for the Ospreys regional team having previously played for Aberavon RFC.

He has recently made a return to football for Shene Old Grammarians, as a goalkeeper. He is currently the reserve keeper behind club stalwart and current Captain's Player of the Season, George Williams.
