= Lloyd Fairbrother =

English rugby player (born 1991)

- Born: Lloyd Fairbrother; 13 November 1991 (age 35) Torpoint, Cornwall, England
- Height: 175 cm (5 ft 9 in)
- Weight: 123 kg (19 st 5 lb; 271 lb)

Rugby union career
- Position: Tighthead Props
- Current team: Dragons
Senior career
| Years | Team | Apps | (Points) |
| 2011–2014 | Exeter Chiefs | 5 | (0) |
| 2011–2012 | → Cornish Pirates | 7 | (0) |
| 2012 | → Birmingham Moseley | 4 | (0) |
| 2013–2014 | → Plymouth | 36 | (5) |
| 2014– | Dragons | 172 | (25) |
- Correct as of 5 February 2024

Lloyd Fairbrother (born 13 November 1991, Torpoint) is a Welsh rugby union player. His position is prop forward.

Fairbrother played for Moseley, Cornish Pirates and Plymouth Albion. In May 2014 he transferred from Exeter Chiefs to the Dragons.

Fairbrother qualifies to play internationally for Wales as his mother was born in Blaenavon.

Fairbrother was called up to the Welsh national side in an uncapped fixture versus the Barbarians, on 4 November 2023.
