= Brok Harris =

South African rugby union player

- Full name: Juan Harris
- Born: 22 February 1985 (age 41) Roodepoort, South Africa
- Height: 1.83 m (6 ft 0 in)
- Weight: 118 kg (18 st 8 lb; 260 lb)
- School: Hoërskool Bastion, Krugersdorp
- University: Potchefstroom
- Notable relative(s): Monique Harris, Anika Harris

Rugby union career
- Position: Tighthead/Loosehead Prop
- Current team: Stormers
Youth career
- 2005: Leopards
Senior career
Years	Team	Apps	(Points)
2006–2014	Western Province	120	(75)
2007–2014	Stormers	93	(10)
2014–2021	Dragons	143	(15)
2021–	Stormers	77	(0)
- Correct as of 26 April 2024

Juan "Brok" Harris (born 22 February 1985) is a South African retired rugby union player whom now coaches for the Stormers and Western Province as a forward coach. He matriculated from Hoërskool Bastion in Krugersdorp, after which he attended Potchefstroom University. He played as a prop for the Stormers in the United Rugby Championship and European Rugby Champions Cup having returned from the Welsh Pro14 side Dragons where he played between 2014 and 2021. He previously played for the Stormers in the Super Rugby and Western Province in the Currie Cup.

Harris can play on both sides of the scrum, and, in 2017, he had spent the required three years in Wales to qualify for the Welsh national side on residency grounds.
