= Matthew Screech =

Wales international rugby union player

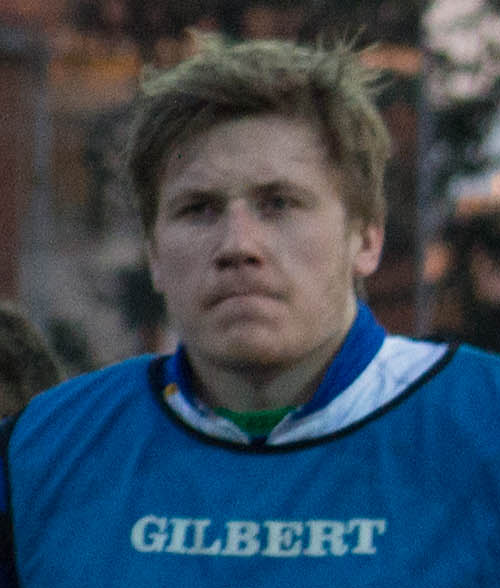
- Born: Matthew Screech; 24 October 1992 (age 34) Church Village, Wales
- Height: 198 cm (6 ft 6 in)
- Weight: 119 kg (18 st 10 lb)

Rugby union career
- Position: Lock
- Current team: Dragons
Senior career
Years	Team	Apps	(Points)
2011–2012	Cardiff Rugby	4	(0)
2013–2021	Dragons	162	(80)
2021–2022	Cardiff Rugby	15	(5)
2022–	Dragons	207	(80)
2023	Barbarians	1	(0)
- Correct as of 13 August 2026
International career
Years	Team	Apps	(Points)
2011–2012	Wales U20	13	(0)
2021-2024	Wales	2	(0)
- Correct as of 13 August 2026

Matthew Screech (born 24 October 1992) grew up in Glynfach Porth is a Welsh rugby union player who plays for Dragons RFC as a lock forward. He is a Wales international

Screech has previously played for Pontypridd RFC and Cardiff RFC at semi-professional level.

After departing Cardiff Screech joined the Dragons for the 2013–14 season and made his debut versus Ulster 6 September 2013. After eight seasons at the Dragons, Screech returned to play for Cardiff.

Screech was called up by Wales for the 2021 July rugby union tests. He made his debut off the bench against Argentina.

On 18 November 2022, Screech rejoined the Dragons on a short term loan, as injury cover for his former team. Before resigning to extend his career with the Dragons, he is now the 2nd all time appearance holder for the region.
