= Adam Hughes (rugby union, born 1990) =

- Born: Adam Hughes; 14 February 1990 (age 36) Newport, Wales
- Height: 176 cm (5 ft 9 in)
- Weight: 93 kg (14 st 9 lb)

Rugby union career
- Position: Centre/Wing
Senior career
Years	Team	Apps	(Points)
2010–2014	Dragons	80	(89)
2014	Bristol	0	(0)
2014-2015	Exeter Chiefs	3	(5)
2015-	Dragons	39	(35)
- Correct as of 25 January 2018

Adam Hughes (born 14 February 1990) is a Welsh former rugby union player. He represented Wales at Under 16, Under 18 and Under 20 level and played for Dragons (rugby union) in the Pro12 competition and Exeter Chiefs in Premiership Rugby.

A centre, Hughes made his debut for the Dragons against Cardiff Blues 23 April 2010. In May 2010 he was selected in the Wales Under 20 Squad for the Junior World Cup in Argentina in June 2010

Adam was voted 'Supporters player of the Year' as voted by the readers of the South Wales Argus, and 'Young player of the Year' in his first season in 2011. He was awarded his cap for 50 starts in his second season with the Dragons in 2012.

He went on to play Wing and Fullback as well as Centre for the Dragons in his three years with the club. He was released by the Dragons at the end of the 2013–14 season and subsequently joined Exeter Chiefs. In 2015 he returned to the Dragons. He retired from rugby at the end of the 2017–18 season after receiving medical advice that brain trauma scars from rugby injuries meant that "playing rugby wasn't an option".
