= Tyler Morgan =

Welsh rugby player (born 1995)

- Born: 11 September 1995 (age 31) Newport, Wales
- Height: 186 cm (6 ft 1 in)
- Weight: 104 kg (229 lb; 16 st 5 lb)

Rugby union career
- Position: Outside Centre
Senior career
Years	Team	Apps	(Points)
2013–2014	Newport RFC	11	(30)
- Correct as of 28 May 2018
Provincial / State sides
Years	Team	Apps	(Points)
2013–2020	Dragons	89	(63)
2020–2022	Scarlets	16	(5)
2022-	Biarritz	31	(30)
- Correct as of 23 January 2024
International career
Years	Team	Apps	(Points)
2014	Wales U20	8	(10)
2015–2017	Wales	5	(5)
- Correct as of 13 March 2021

Tyler Morgan (born 11 September 1995) is a Welsh rugby union player for Biarritz Olympique in the Pro D2. Morgan's primary position is Outside Centre.

On 26 December 2014, Morgan signed a National Dual Contract with the WRU and the Dragons.

On 16 May 2022, Morgan was released by Scarlets.

== International ==
On 20 January 2015, Morgan was named in the 34-man senior Wales squad for the 2015 Six Nations Championship

Morgan made his full international debut in the starting line up for Wales versus Ireland on 8 August 2015.

On 2 October 2015, Morgan got his second cap for wales in the Pool A victory against Fiji, starting in the no13 jersey.

=== International tries ===
Try	Opponent	Location	Venue	Competition	Date	Result
1	Tonga	Cardiff, Wales	Millennium Stadium	2018 Autumn Internationals	17 November 2018	Win
