= James Down =

Welsh rugby union player

- Birth name: James Down
- Date of birth: 29 August 1987 (age 38)
- Place of birth: Bridgend, Wales
- Height: 1.96 m (6 ft 5 in)
- Weight: 118 kg (260 lb)

Rugby union career
- Position(s): Lock
Senior career
Years	Team	Apps	(Points)
2006–2014	Cardiff Blues	63	(5)
2014–2015	London Welsh		()
2015–2020	Cardiff Blues	69	(0)
2020–2022	Lokomotiv Penza		()

James Down (born 29 August 1987) is a rugby union player for the Russian club Lokomotiv Penza. His position of choice is second row.

On 23 July 2014, Down moved to England to join London Welsh in the Aviva Premiership from the 2014–15 season. but returned to Cardiff in the following season.
