= Tom Isaacs =

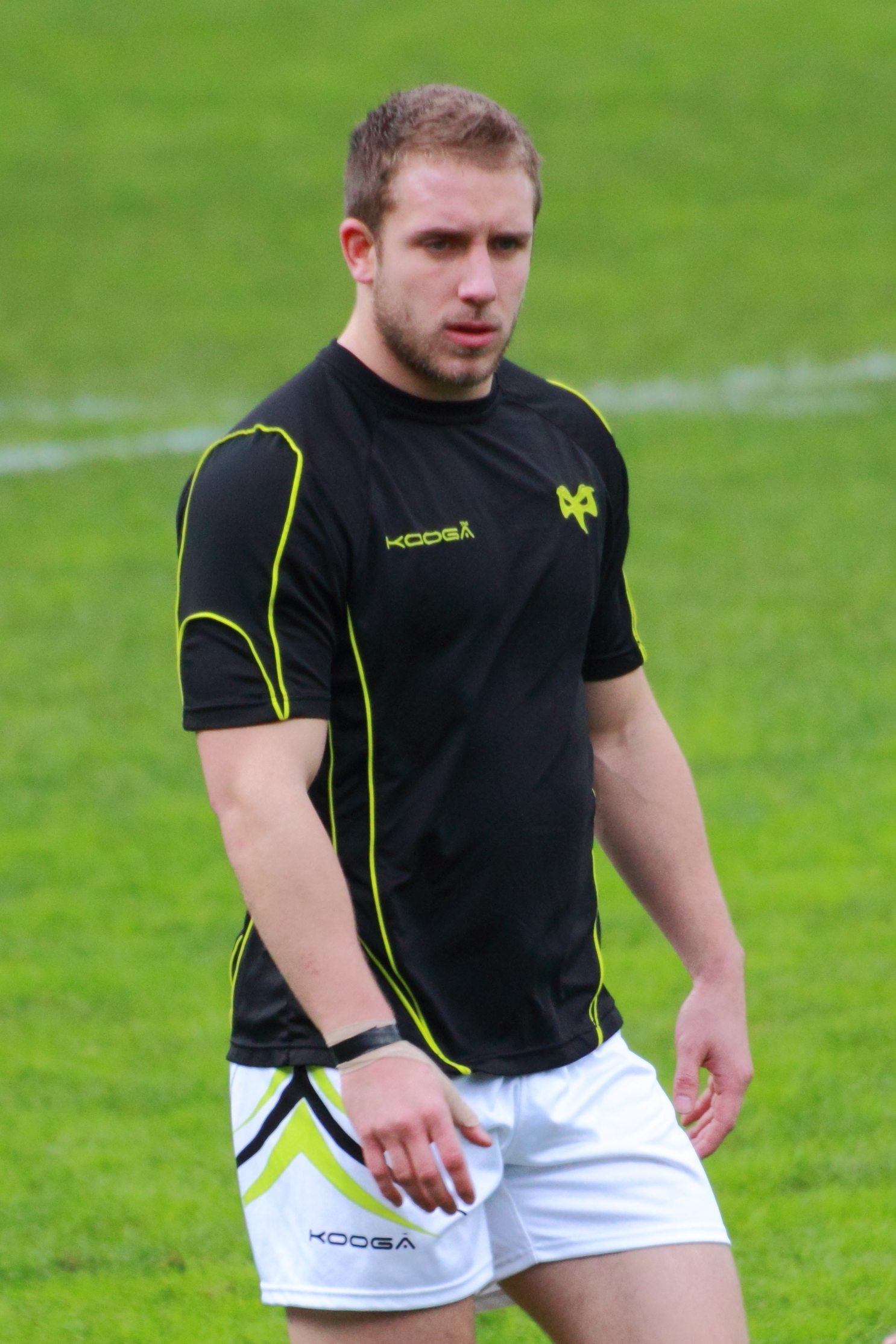
- Born: Tom Isaacs; 18 February 1987 (age 39) Cardiff, Wales
- Height: 183 cm (6 ft 0 in)
- Weight: 90 kg (14 st 2 lb; 200 lb)

Rugby union career
- Position: Centre
- Current team: Gloucester Rugby
Senior career
Years	Team	Apps	(Points)
2008-2009	Newport Gwent Dragons	7	(5)
2009-2014	Ospreys	66	(25)
2014	Gloucester Rugby		
2014–	Cardiff Blues		
National sevens team
Years	Team		Comps
2009	Wales		Dubai
Medal record
Men's rugby sevens
Representing Wales
Rugby World Cup Sevens
Gold medal – first place	2009 Dubai	Team competition

Tom Isaacs (born 18 February 1987) is a Welsh rugby union player who played for the Cardiff Blues. A centre, he represented the Wales sevens squad in 2009 and was part of the squad that won the 7s World Cup in Dubai.

Isaacs joined the Ospreys from Newport Gwent Dragons in April 2009. On 26 March 2014, Isaacs will join Gloucester Rugby in the English Aviva Premiership from the 2014–15 season. However, due to fierce competition for first-team places, he left Gloucester with immediate effect, to join his home region Cardiff Blues on a one-and-a-half-year deal until the end of the 2015–16 season. Tom has now moved to Hong Kong and is currently playing rugby at Hong Kong Football Club as a semi professional, he is also working as a physical education teacher at King George Five School in Hong Kong.
