= Tom Davies (rugby union, born 1986) =

English rugby union footballer

- Born: Tom Davies; 24 March 1986 (age 40) Doncaster, England
- Height: 180 cm (5 ft 11 in)
- Weight: 110 kg (17 st 5 lb; 243 lb)

Rugby union career
- Position: Prop
- Current team: Doncaster Knights
Senior career
Years	Team	Apps	(Points)
2010–2011	Cardiff Blues	7	(0)
2011–	Doncaster Knights		
- Correct as of 10 November 2012

Tomas Arthwr Davies (born 24 March 1986) is a rugby union player. A prop forward, he played club rugby for Doncaster Knights from 2005 to 2015, having previously played for Cardiff Blues. Davies qualifies for Wales as both his parents were born in Aberdare and he represented Wales at Under 18 level and Yorkshire Under 20s. He has also played for the Barbarians.

He retired from professional rugby in 2015 for a career in chemical engineering, following a degree in that subject at the University of Sheffield.
