= Jack Dixon =

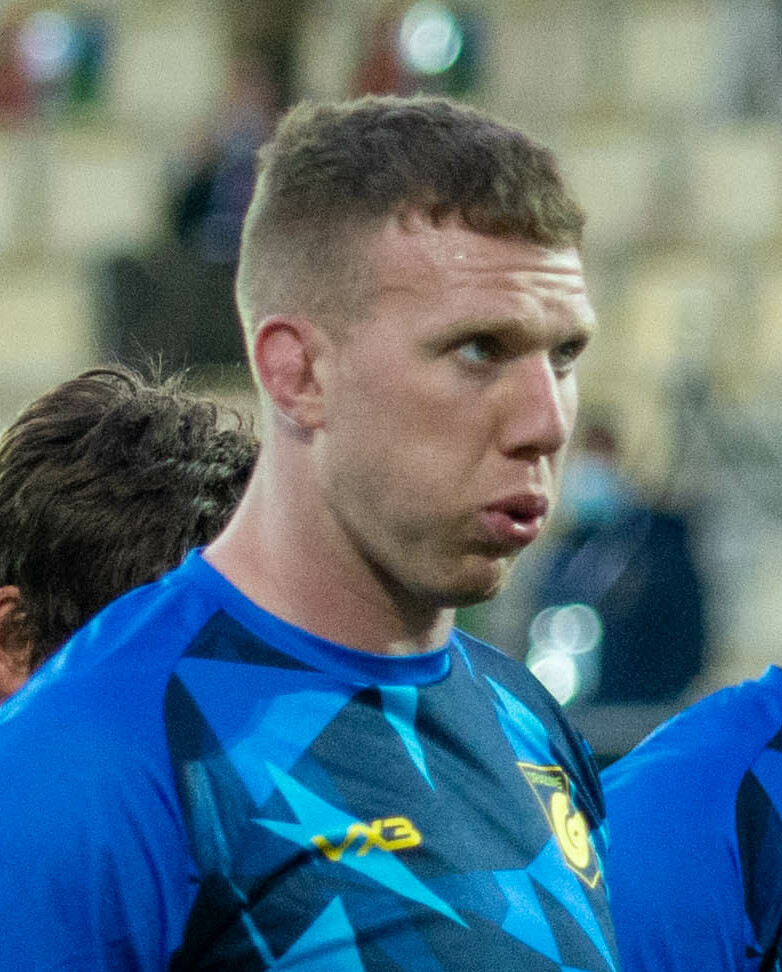
- Jack Dixon in 2021.
- Born: Jack Dixon; 13 December 1994 (age 31) Newbridge, Caerphilly, Wales
- Height: 188 cm (6 ft 2 in)
- Weight: 90 kg (14 st 2 lb; 198 lb)

Rugby union career
- Position: Centre
- Current team: Dragons
Senior career
Years	Team	Apps	(Points)
2011–	Dragons	172	(60)
- Correct as of 11:39, 6 February 2024 (UTC)
International career
Years	Team	Apps	(Points)
2012	Wales U20	1	(0)
- Correct as of 13:56, 9 March 2012 (UTC)

Jack Dixon (born 13 December 1994) is a Welsh rugby union player who plays for Dragons regional team having previously played for Bedwas RFC and Newport RFC. A centre, he made his debut for Newport Gwent Dragons in October 2011 versus Wasps in the Anglo-Welsh Cup as a second-half replacement aged 16 years and 313 days. In doing so, Dixon broke the record for the youngest player to play Welsh regional rugby held by Hallam Amos who set the record earlier in the same match.

Dixon made his debut for the Wales Under-20 team on 9 March 2012 versus Italy. In April 2012 he was named in the Wales Under-20 squad for the Junior World Cup in South Africa.

In January 2013 he was selected in the Wales Under 20 squad for the 2013 Under 20 Six Nations Championship.
