= Ollie Griffiths =

Wales international rugby union player

- Born: Oliver Griffiths; 23 March 1995 (age 31) Newport, Wales
- Height: 185 cm (6 ft 1 in)
- Weight: 104 kg (16 st 5 lb; 229 lb)

Rugby union career
- Position: Openside Flanker
- Current team: Dragons
Senior career
Years	Team	Apps	(Points)
2014–2024	Dragons	105	(30)
- Correct as of 11:42, 6 February 2024 (UTC)
International career
Years	Team	Apps	(Points)
2014–2015	Wales U20	10	(0)
2017	Wales	1	(0)
- Correct as of 13 March 2021

Oliver Griffiths (born 23 March 1995) is a former Welsh rugby union player who played for the Dragons regional team as a flanker.

Griffiths made his debut for the Newport Gwent Dragons regional team in 2014, having previously played for the Dragons academy, Cross Keys RFC, and Newport RFC. Griffiths was made Newport RFC’s youngest-ever captain.

Griffiths retired in 2024 due to being diagnosed with Langerhans cell histiocytosis.

== International ==
In May 2017, Griffiths was selected for the Wales national team summer 2017 tour of Samoa and Tonga.

Griffiths made his test debut off the bench against Tonga on 15 June 2017. He came off the bench in an uncapped match against the Barbarians.
