= Nic Cudd =

Welsh rugby union footballer

- Born: Nic Cudd; 12 October 1988 (age 38) Carmarthen, Wales
- Height: 180 cm (5 ft 11 in)
- Weight: 98 kg (15 st 6 lb; 216 lb)

Rugby union career
- Position: Flanker
Senior career
Years	Team	Apps	(Points)
2010-2012	Scarlets	0	(0)
2012-2020	Dragons	119	(45)

Nic Cudd (born 12 October 1988) is a rugby union flanker. He previously played for the Dragons, Llanelli RFC and the Scarlets.

Cudd joined the Scarlets Academy in 2004, when he was 16 years old. In the summer of 2010, Cudd signed a development contract with the Scarlets to be a full-time member of their squad. In September 2012 Cudd joined the Dragons He was released by the Dragons at the end of the 2019–20 season.
