= Wayne Evans (rugby union) =

Welsh rugby player

- Born: 3 June 1984 (age 42) Carmarthen, Wales
- Height: 178 cm (5 ft 10 in)
- Weight: 85 kg (13 st 5 lb)

Rugby union career
- Current team: Coventry R.F.C.
Senior career
Years	Team	Apps	(Points)
2007–2014	NG Dragons	142	(65)
2014-	Coventry	0	(0)
- Correct as of 22 November 2011

Wayne Evans (born 3 June 1984) is a Welsh rugby union footballer who plays scrum half and has gained international honours with Wales under 18s, 21s and Sevens (Dubai, George, Commonwealth Games, Hong Kong, Adelaide, London and Murreyfield).

Evans started playing rugby St Clears and Narberth at junior level, before playing for the youth team at Carmarthen Quins. In 2001, Evans played for the Scarlets Academy and Carmarthen Quins Seniors XV. Cardiff Blues signed Evans in 2005, where he was also involved in playing for Pontypridd RFC prior to joining Newport Gwent Dragons.

Evans signed an extended contract with Newport Gwent Dragons in January 2010.

In July 2014 Evans joined Coventry
