= Scott Otten =

- Born: Scott Otten; 19 July 1994 (age 32) Swansea, Wales
- Height: 1.82 m (6 ft 0 in)
- Weight: 103 kg (16 st 3 lb)
- School: Gower College Swansea

Rugby union career
- Position: Hooker
- Current team: Ospreys
Senior career
Years	Team	Apps	(Points)
2013–2021	Ospreys	110	(55)
- Correct as of 18 May 2021
International career
Years	Team	Apps	(Points)
2014	Wales U20	7	(0)
- Correct as of 18 May 2021

Scott Otten (born 19 July 1994) is a Welsh former rugby union player who played for Ospreys as a hooker. He also played for the Wales under-20 international side.

Otten made his debut for the Ospreys in 2013 having previously played for the Ospreys academy, Aberavon RFC, Neath RFC, Swansea RFC and Waunarlwydd RFC.

In May 2021, based on medical advice, he retired from professional rugby after a neck injury back in January of the same year.
