= Tom Habberfield =

Welsh rugby union player

Thomas J Habberfield
- Born: Thomas J Habberfield; 19 May 1988 (age 38) Bridgend, Wales
- Height: 178 cm (5 ft 10 in)
- Weight: 80 kg (12 st 8 lb; 176 lb)

Rugby union career
- Position: Scrum half
- Current team: Cardiff RFC
Senior career
| Years | Team | Apps | (Points) |
| 2010–2012 | Bridgend | 0 | (0) |
| 2012–2019 | Ospreys | 136 | (45) |
| 2019– | Cardiff RFC | 32 | (40) |
- Correct as of 8 April 2023
International career
| Years | Team | Apps | (Points) |
| 2012 | Wales U20 | 1 | (0) |
- Correct as of 3 May 2012

Thomas J Habberfield (born 19 May 1988) is a Welsh rugby union player who plays scrum half for Cardiff RFC. He also previously played for the Ospreys and Bridgend Ravens.

In November 2011 he was named in the Wales sevens squad.

In April 2012 he was named in the Wales Under-20 squad for the Junior World Cup in South Africa.
