= Lloyd Ashley =

Welsh rugby union player

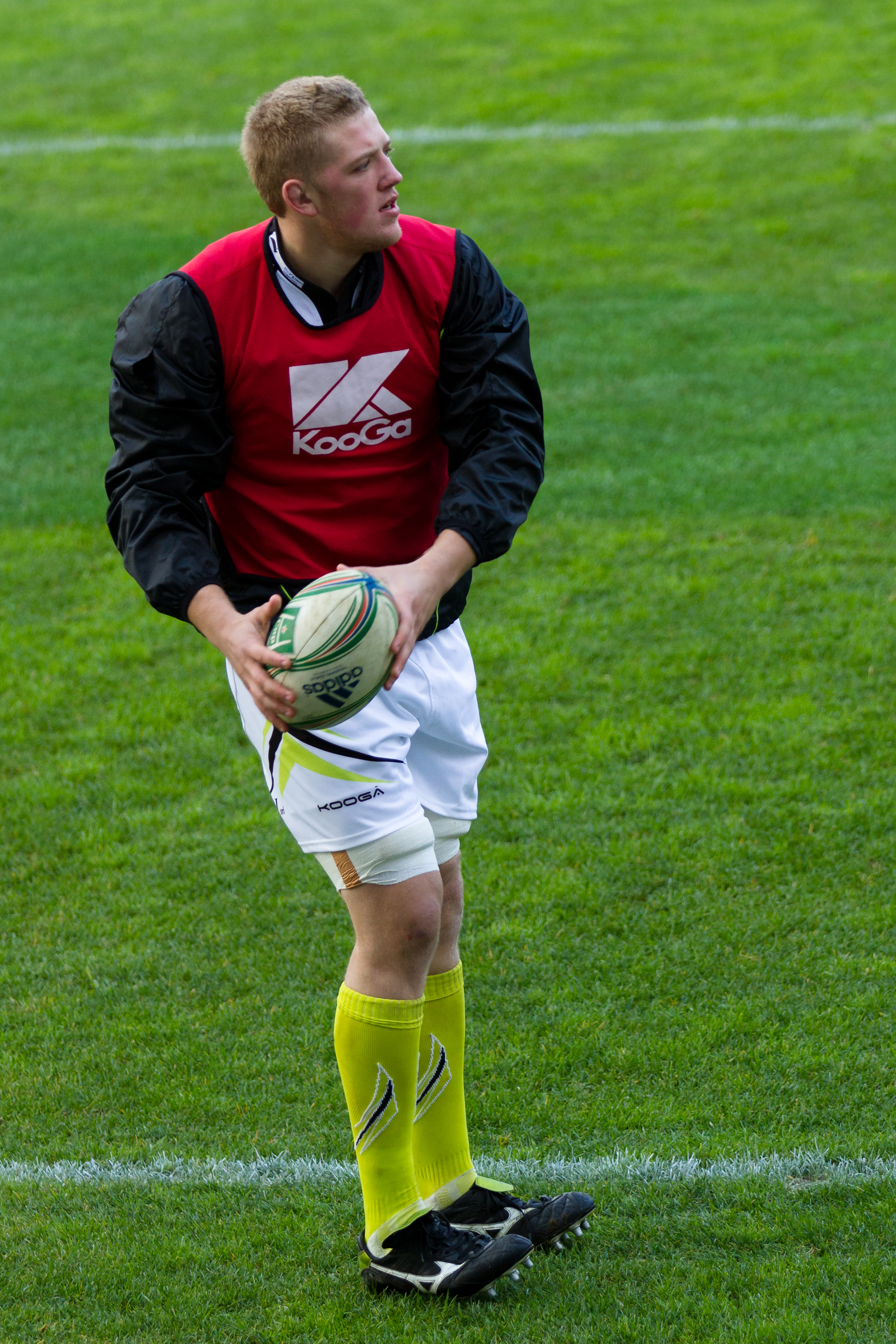
- Born: Lloyd Ashley Peers; 2 February 1991 (age 35) Caerphilly, Wales
- Height: 195 cm (6 ft 5 in)
- Weight: 114 kg (17 st 13 lb; 251 lb)
- School: Porthcawl Comprehensive School
- University: Pencoed College

Rugby union career
- Position: Lock
Senior career
Years	Team	Apps	(Points)
2011–	Ospreys	123	(5)
2021	→ Scarlets (loan)	3	(0)

Lloyd Ashley (né Lloyd Ashley Peers; born 2 February 1991) is a Welsh rugby union player who plays as a lock for the Ospreys. In October 2021, he joined the Scarlets on a short-term loan deal to cover an injury crisis. He has also played at club level for Bridgend Athletic, Bridgend Ravens, Merthyr and Cardiff.

Born Lloyd Peers, he and his wife Febe shared the same middle name, Ashley, which they adopted as their surname after getting married in 2015.
