= James King (rugby union, born 1990) =

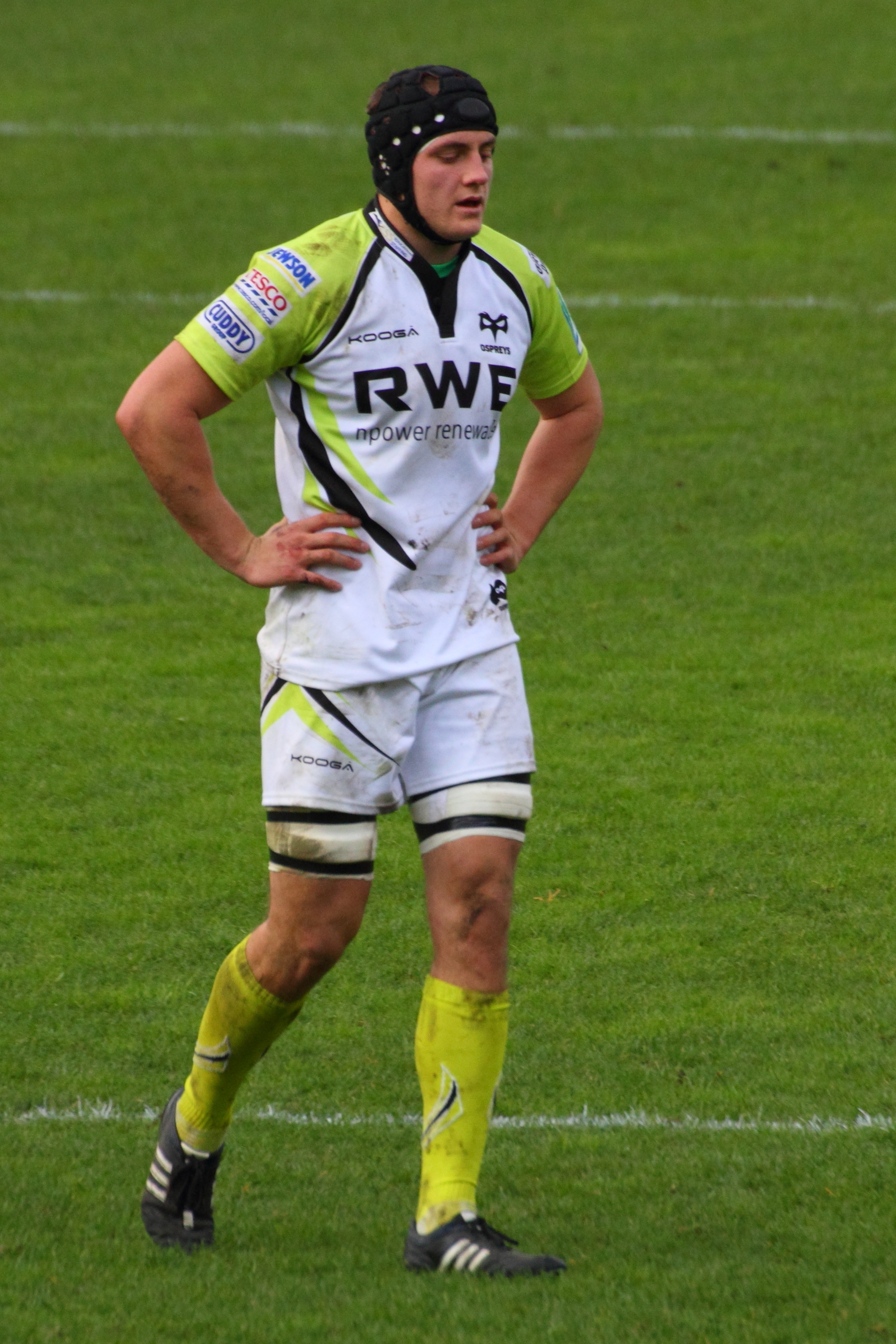
- Born: James King; 24 July 1990 (age 36) Wodonga, Australia
- Height: 193 cm (6 ft 4 in)
- Weight: 107 kg (16 st 12 lb; 236 lb)
- School: Alun School

Rugby union career
- Position(s): Blindside Flanker; Lock; Number 8
Senior career
Years	Team	Apps	(Points)
2008–2012	Aberavon	48	(25)
2009–2021	Ospreys	203	(35)
International career
Years	Team	Apps	(Points)
- Wales U18
2009–2010	Wales U20	14	(0)
2013–2017	Wales	11	(0)

James King (born 24 July 1990) is a former Welsh rugby union player. A flanker or lock forward, he played for the Ospreys regional rugby side and the Welsh national side, having previously played for Aberavon.

In January 2012 King suffered a lacerated ear injury in a collision with Xavier Rush of the Cardiff Blues and had to undergo emergency plastic surgery at Morriston Hospital, Swansea.

In January 2013 he was selected in the 35-man Wales squad for the 2013 Six Nations championship. He made his international debut against Japan on 8 June 2013 and would go on to win 11 caps for the national side, including at the 2015 Rugby World Cup.

He was forced to retire from professional rugby in January 2021 aged just 30, after failing to recover from an injury sustained whilst playing against Ulster in 2019.
