= Rory Thornton =

Welsh rugby union footballer (born 1995)

- Born: Rory Thornton; 16 March 1995 (age 31) Swansea, Wales
- Height: 201 cm (6 ft 7 in)
- Weight: 121 kg (19 st 1 lb; 267 lb)

Rugby union career
- Position: Lock
- Current team: Cardiff Rugby
Senior career
Years	Team	Apps	(Points)
2014–2017	Ospreys	62	(0)
2017–	Cardiff Rugby	120	(20)
- Correct as of 13 August 2026
International career
Years	Team	Apps	(Points)
2014	Wales U20	14	(0)
2017	Wales	1	(0)
- Correct as of 23 June 2017

Rory Thornton (born 16 March 1995) is a Welsh rugby union footballer who plays for the Cardiff Rugby. His position is lock forward.

Thornton began his rugby career at Bonymaen RFC before joining the Swansea RFC and then the Ospreys. Thornton joined Cardiff on a season long loan prior to the 2018-2019 Pro 14 season and then signed a permanent contract with Cardiff for the following season.

== International ==
Thornton captained the Wales Under-20 team.

In January 2014, Thornton was called up to the Wales national rugby union team training squad for the 2015 Rugby World Cup. In May 2017, he was named in the Wales senior squad for the tests against Tonga and Samoa in June 2017
