= Marc Breeze =

Welsh rugby union footballer

- Born: Marc Breeze; 11 February 1987 (age 39) Cwmavon, Neath Port Talbot, Wales
- Height: 180 cm (5 ft 11 in)
- Weight: 109 kg (17 st 2 lb)

Rugby union career
- Position: Hooker
- Current team: Cardiff Blues
Senior career
| Years | Team | Apps | (Points) |
| 2012- | Cardiff Blues | 21 | (5) |
- Correct as of 18:00, 10 November 2012 (UTC)

Marc Breeze (born 11 February 1987) is a Welsh rugby union player. A hooker, he played club rugby for the Cardiff Blues having previously played for Ospreys, London Welsh RFC, Aberavon RFC and Aberavon Quins RFC.
