= Dragons RFC =

Welsh professional rugby union team

- Founded: 2003
- Location: Newport, Wales
- Ground: Rodney Parade (Capacity: 8,700)
- Chairman: David Wright
- Coach: Filo Tiatia
- Captain: Ben Carter
- Most caps: Lewis Evans (236)
- Top scorer: Jason Tovey (974)
- Most tries: Aled Brew (43)
- League: United Rugby Championship
- 2025–26: 15th (Welsh Shield: 3rd)
1st kit	2nd kit	3rd kit

Official website
- www.dragonsrugby.wales
- Current season

Dragons RFC (Welsh: Clwb Rygbi Dreigiau) are one of the four professional rugby union regional teams in Wales. They play in the United Rugby Championship and the European Rugby Champions Cup/European Rugby Challenge Cup. They play their home games at Rodney Parade, Newport, which was the home of Newport RFC from 1877 to 2017, and is shared with Newport County AFC, the city's English Football League team.

The Dragons were formed in 2003 as a result of the introduction of regional rugby union teams in Wales, and represent a region that covers an area of southeast Wales including Blaenau Gwent, Caerphilly, Monmouthshire, Newport and Torfaen, with a total population approaching 600,000. They are affiliated with a number of semi-professional and amateur clubs throughout the area, including Pontypool RFC, Caerphilly RFC, Cross Keys RFC, Ebbw Vale RFC and Newport RFC.

The team has been owned by Dragons RFC Ltd since 2023, having been solely owned by the Welsh Rugby Union from 2017 to 2023 and jointly owned by the WRU and Newport RFC between 2004 and 2017.

The Dragons started life with a third-place finish in the 2003–04 Celtic League, and finished fourth the next season; however, the team finished in the bottom three in each of the next four seasons.They reached the semi-finals of the European Challenge Cup on three occasions, in 2007,2015 and 2016. In 2011, they reached the semi-finals of the Anglo-Welsh Cup, losing to Gloucester. They are yet to make the knock-out stage of the European Rugby Champions Cup.

== History ==
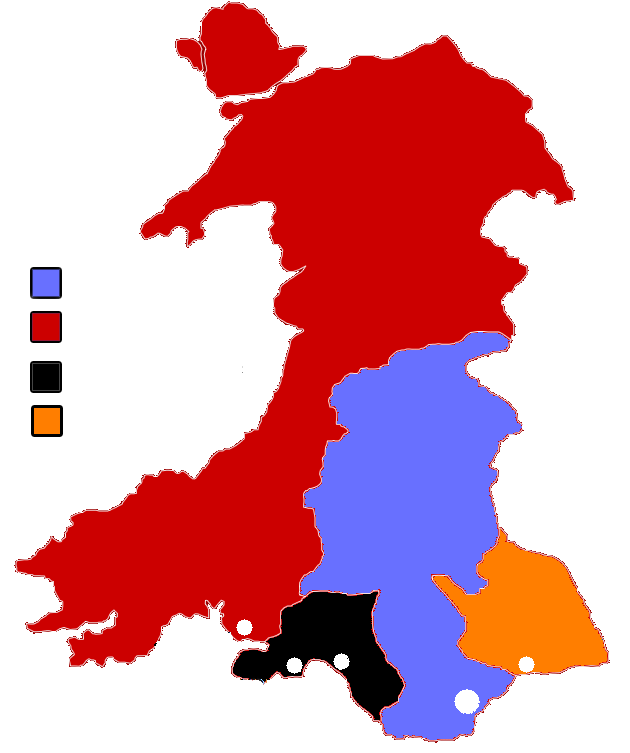
The 4 Welsh Rugby Union Regions of Wales

=== Formation ===
The regional team were formed on 1 April 2003, following an agreement between Ebbw Vale RFC and Newport RFC to form one of five regional rugby entities. Fundamental disagreements between the clubs saw a period of arbitration, led by the then Welsh Rugby Union chief executive David Moffett, which recommended the name "Gwent Dragons". On 28 July the side was launched under that name. This prompted Newport RFC benefactor Tony Brown of Bisley, Surrey to withdraw his financial support for the region. However, by 21 August Brown returned after Ebbw Vale chairman Marcus Russell resigned and the side's name was changed to "Newport and Gwent Dragons". With the Welsh Rugby Union demanding an explanation for the changes, and acrimony between the two clubs another agreement was struck: the side officially became 'Newport Gwent Dragons'. On 12 November 2003, the region's founding company Gwent Rugby Ltd entered into administration. On 27 November a new company, Dragons Rugby Ltd., was established to run the region, with Newport RFC and the Welsh Rugby Union each holding a 50% stake.

=== 2003–2005: Infancy ===
The logo used by the regional team between 2003 and 2017.

Under Mike Ruddock and his assistant Clive Griffiths Newport Gwent Dragons, with a squad largely drawn from the Newport RFC and Ebbw Vale RFC sides of the preceding year, beat their limited pre-season expectations. Despite starting their life in top-class rugby with a 35–11 defeat away to Llanelli Scarlets, it was the region's most successful season so far. A 29–19 win over the Ospreys was to prove more telling; captained by Andy Marinos the side remained unbeaten at home in the Celtic League and eliminated Stade Français Paris in the Heineken Cup. Going into the final round with an outside chance of taking the title, the Dragons finished third in the Celtic League WRU bosses were impressed enough to appoint Ruddock to the vacant Welsh coaching job in summer 2004. In 2005, Ruddock guided Wales to a Grand Slam Title in the Six Nations. Ruddock rewarded two of his former Dragons players, Hal Luscombe and Jason Forster, with their first test caps on Wales' summer tour of Argentina. Wales Percy Montgomery also impressed Springbok selectors enough to remind them of his international credentials, and earn a Tri Nations recall.

The following off season saw a marked change in direction. Gareth Cooper, Kevin Morgan and Ceri Sweeney were amongst a handful of players who joined the region when the Celtic Warriors were disbanded. Having originally agreed to replace Mike Ruddock as head coach, Declan Kidney decided instead to seek employment back home with Leinster. It was not until 27 July 2004 that former Australia national rugby league team coach Chris Anderson was appointed, with Leigh Jones as his assistant. Another credible Celtic League campaign followed, finishing fourth, the second highest Welsh region. The side's Heineken Cup could be viewed as a wasted opportunity: the team beat French side Perpignan 27–14 at home, but were then beaten home and away by Newcastle Falcons to put paid to any quarter-final ambitions. Chris Anderson's contract was not extended beyond its initial one-year duration.

=== 2005–2011 Paul Turner era ===
The region looked to Harlequins backs coach Paul Turner, a Welshman, as their new head coach. Turner would also have to contend with Percy Montgomery returning to South Africa and Newport RFC stalwart Rod Snow retiring. Munster and Sale Sharks proved too strong in the 2005–06 Heineken Cup. After finishing 8th in the Celtic League, a 24–15 defeat to Overmach Parma in a play-off for a place in the following seasons Heineken cup proved a new low for the region. Anglo-Welsh Cup wins over Leicester Tigers and Northampton Saints were the highlights of a tough season. Turner remained, but Wales international Hal Luscombe opted for a move away from the region, joining English Premiership side Harlequins.

Former Wales captain Colin Charvis joined ahead of the 2006–07 season with the Dragons progressed into a European Challenge Cup semi-final, where they lost comfortably to ASM Clermont Auvergne. Domestically though, the region's European exploits appeared to take their toll, finishing ninth in the Celtic League. Significantly the region avoided the prospect of a second season away from the Heineken Cup, defeating another Italian side Calvisano 22–15. The match also marked the end for departing Wales internationals Ian Gough and Gareth Cooper at Rodney Parade.

2007–08 proved to be another difficult season for the region. Signings such as scrum-half Andy Williams and flanker Richard Parks were not able to help reverse the side's fortunes. The Dragons 2007–08 Heineken Cup campaign only saw one win against Italian side Treviso and exiting the Anglo-Welsh Cup in the pool stages for a third year running. Between completing a double over Llanelli Scarlets on 1 January to defeating the Ospreys on 6 May, the Dragons failed to win a Celtic League game. Despite finishing as the lowest-placed Welsh side in the league the region qualified for next season's Heineken Cup, without having to play off against Italian opposition due to a failure by the Italian League to finish before a specified date.

The summer of 2008 marked a change in the Dragons recruitment policy to a more antipodean focus. Several new signings included New Zealander Tom Willis who was also appointed captain. The 2008–09 Heineken Cup saw visible signs of encouragement for the region. An opening round defeat of Glasgow at Rodney Parade and two respectable defeats to French giants Toulouse, sandwiched between narrow losses against Bath offered hope of arresting decline at Rodney Parade. Domestically in the Celtic League it was a case of same old as consecutive defeats in rearranged matches away at Cardiff Blues and the Ospreys ended any hopes of avoiding finishing as the lowest placed Welsh region and another Heineken Cup play off against Italian opposition. In record appearance holder Adam Black's final game for the side, the Dragons ran out comfortable winners away to Calvisano to secure their place in European rugby's premier tournament for a third season running.

The 2009–10 season brought about significant improvements in results, with the Dragons remaining unbeaten at Rodney Parade in the Celtic League until their final home match, a 20–14 loss to Cardiff Blues. Defeat also brought about the end of the Dragons bid to qualify for the inaugural Celtic League playoffs. An improved seventh-place finish did, however, mean automatic qualification for the Heineken cup as the third highest finishing Welsh region. Despite coming close to defeating Gloucester away at Kingsholm and a win at home against Glasgow, back to back losses at Biarritz put paid to the Dragons chances of progressing past the group stages of the Heineken Cup for the first time.

=== 2011–2017 ===
Turner stepped down as head coach in February 2011 with Darren Edwards taking over in a caretaker capacity. In March 2011 Edwards led the Dragons to their first Anglo-Welsh Cup semi-final, where they lost to Gloucester. In April 2011 Edwards was appointed Head Coach on a full-time basis. Lyn Jones was appointed to the role of Director of Rugby in 2013 taking over a lot of on field responsibilities. He brought with him then Russia head coach Kingsley Jones who worked with him as a consultant at London Welsh. Edwards left the Dragons in February 2014 while in June, Jones was promoted to the role of head coach.

During the 2014–2015 season, the Dragons reached the semi-finals of the Challenge Cup, having defeated the Cardiff Blues 25–21. This was their second time reaching the semi-finals, having done so in 2007. They lost 45–16 to Edinburgh in the semi-final.

The following season, the Dragons once again reached the semi-finals of the Challenge Cup, but lost 22–12 to Montpellier.

=== 2017–2023: WRU ownership ===
In March 2017, following a vote of Newport RFC shareholders, the Welsh Rugby Union agreed to take over the Newport Gwent Dragons in its entirety as part of a deal that also saw the WRU take ownership of the Rodney Parade ground. Following the takeover, Bernard Jackman was appointed head coach, and on 20 June 2017 it was announced that following the takeover of the region by the WRU, the region would be dropping "Newport Gwent" from its name with immediate effect, becoming known simply as "Dragons". Jackman's endured a difficult first season in charge in 2017–18, with the Dragons recording only two wins in the league. Despite recruiting heavily for the 2018-19 campaign, including Wales forwards Ross Moriarty and Richard Hibbard, results did not improve and Jackman was dismissed in 2019 to be replaced by Dean Ryan.

During the WRU-ownership period, the Dragons signed a large number of English-born players eligible for Wales thanks to parents or grandparents, such as Ross Moriarty, Will Talbot-Davies, Tom Griffiths, Huw Taylor, Nick Tompkins, Joe Maksymiw, Greg Bateman and Will Rowlands.

Ahead of the 2022–2023 season, the Dragons continued their extensive recruitment drive, including established props Rhodri Jones and Rob Evans, as well as locks Sean Lonsdale and George Nott from the Premiership. JJ Hanrahan joined from Clermont, while two centres; Welsh-qualified Max Clark and New Zealander Sio Tomkinson added further depth. Further signings were made in the lead up to season.

=== 2023 onwards: Return to private ownership ===
In July 2023 a consortium headed by Dragons chairman David Buttress bought Rodney Parade and the Dragons from the WRU.

During the 2024–25 United Rugby Championship, the Dragons saw their worst season yet, with one win in the league, equaling the league record. During the season, head coach Dai Flanagan was sacked and replaced by defence coach Filo Tiatia, however little improvement was seen, with the only subsequent win coming in the EPCR Challenge Cup against Newcastle Falcons.

== Team name ==
The naming of the region's team caused considerable turbulence. Newport Gwent Dragons were a new side created out of the restructuring of Welsh rugby, and represent their designated region, like the Cardiff Blues, the Scarlets and the Ospreys. Some in the Welsh rugby world, such as Bobby Windsor, believed that including the name Newport would alienate some fans in the surrounding valleys. Many supporters in the wider Newport area favoured greater identification with the City of Newport and a continuation of the historic traditions of Newport RFC. Several names were suggested but all were rejected by the WRU. In the end, the WRU decided the region would be called the Gwent Dragons. However, initial response to the new region was mixed, with many fans unsure whether to buy a season ticket for the new side or to stick to their local clubs. The company set up to run the side entered administration before a game had been played, and as a compromise the word "Newport" was added to the team name in a double-sized font, whilst "Gwent" was reduced. This addition and choice of kit added a greater Newport emphasis to the region and polarised the regions' fan base: some supporters of Ebbw Vale, Pontypool, Cross Keys and Newbridge turned their backs on the regional side, claiming that Gwent was no longer being equally represented. This debate continued, with the Dragons being accused of favouritism towards their Newport feeder club rather than the other feeder clubs.

The Newport Action Group, among others, claimed the side has lost more supporters by including the name "Gwent" in its title. The crowds supporting Newport Gwent Dragons averaged 5,154 for the 2005–06 season, whereas in the 2002–03 season, Newport RFC was Wales' best supported club and British rugby's fourth best with an average attendance of 8,302 – behind English Premiership clubs Leicester, Gloucester and Northampton. In the 2006–07 season, attendance averaged 5,629 at Rodney Parade.

In 2017, after the takeover by the WRU, the club was rebranded as simply “The Dragons”, omitting any geographic identifier.

On the 27 June 2022, the Dragons announced their rebranding as Dragons RFC. The new playing colours being black and amber to represent the traditional colours of Newport sporting teams and the blue of the historic Monmouthshire county. The new badge includes three fleur-de-lis derived from the county Flag of Monmouthshire.

== Kit ==
As Newport Gwent Dragons and subsequently Dragons, the team's home kits were predominantly black, with red or occasionally yellow, orange or gold highlights, intended to evoke fire whilst also contrasting with the other new regional sides and not obviously resembling the traditional colours of any of the region's most prominent feeder clubs.

Since rebranding as Dragons RFC in 2022, red has no longer featured and yellow has been featured more strongly, with this change explicitly being described by the side as an attempt to emphasise the connection with the traditional Newport RFC colours and nickname, the "Black-and-Ambers". Dragons RFC kits in recent seasons have been predominantly yellow, with black detailing.

== Esports ==
Dragons RFC established an esports team in 2023 to compete in the Welsh Esports League (WEL) after the league was launched that year. Among the founding teams were Dragons RFC Esports, Cardiff Pirates (linked to Cardiff Rugby), and the Pit Ponies (associated with Pontypridd United F.C.), as reported by local media.

In 2025, Dragons RFC fielded a Counter-Strike 2 team in the Welsh Esports League Premiership. Their fixture against S.E.A. Dragons attracted notable regional coverage, in which Dragons lost 13–4. The team is also recognised as a full member club of Esports Wales.

== Home ground ==
The region's ground is the 8,700 capacity Rodney Parade ground in Newport, where they play the majority of their home games. Games are occasionally hosted at other grounds in Gwent, such as Pontypool Park or Pandy Park (home of Cross Keys RFC). These are usually pre-season or other fixtures, however occasionally league games are taken elsewhere such as in 2017 when a game against local rivals Cardiff Blues was hosted at the Constructaquote Stadium (formerly Virginia Park), home of Caerphilly RFC, due to a fixture clash with Newport County AFC; and during the 2017/18 season when the Dragons hosted a Pro14 game against Edinburgh Rugby in Eugene Cross Park, Ebbw Vale.

As a part of Judgement Day, each season a home game against a rival Welsh rugby region is hosted at the Millennium Stadium in Cardiff.

In preparation for the 2014–15 season the Newport Gwent Dragons agreed a partnership with Caerphilly County Borough Council for the team and coaching staff to use the CCB Centre for Sporting Excellence as the new training base for the 1st team and all other age grade structures within the region. The small stadium at the centre hosts the home matches of the Dragons U23 side, which competes in the Celtic Cup. Owing to a frozen pitch at Rodney Parade, the CCB Centre hosted a Challenge Cup fixture on 22 January 2023.

== URC league standings ==
Pos	Team	Pld	W	D	L	PF	PA	PD	TF	TA	TB	LB	Pts	Qualification
1	Edinburgh	3	3	0	0	80	54	+26	10	7	2	0	14	Qualification for the Champions Cup and knockout stage
2	Glasgow Warriors	3	2	1	0	95	72	+23	14	10	3	0	13	Qualification for the Champions Cup and knockout stage
3	Bulls	3	2	0	1	126	54	+72	19	7	2	1	11	Qualification for the Champions Cup and knockout stage
4	Stormers	3	2	0	1	81	54	+27	11	7	2	1	11	Qualification for the Champions Cup and knockout stage
5	Sharks	3	2	0	1	89	83	+6	12	13	2	0	10	Qualification for the Champions Cup and knockout stage
6	Cardiff	3	2	0	1	66	71	−5	11	11	1	0	9	Qualification for the Champions Cup and knockout stage
7	Lions	3	2	0	1	77	102	−25	11	16	1	0	9	Qualification for the Champions Cup and knockout stage
8	Dragons	3	1	1	1	88	83	+5	13	13	2	1	9	Qualification for the Champions Cup and knockout stage
9	Munster	3	1	1	1	72	74	−2	10	11	2	1	9	Qualification for the Challenge Cup
10	Leinster	3	1	0	2	75	58	+17	12	8	2	2	8	Qualification for the Challenge Cup
11	Ulster	3	0	2	1	88	93	−5	13	13	3	1	8	Qualification for the Challenge Cup
12	Scarlets	3	1	0	2	68	85	−17	10	13	2	1	7	Qualification for the Challenge Cup
13	Ospreys	3	1	0	2	81	107	−26	13	15	2	0	6	Qualification for the Challenge Cup
14	Connacht	3	1	0	2	56	84	−28	9	12	1	0	5	Qualification for the Challenge Cup
15	Benetton	3	0	1	2	64	68	−4	10	11	1	2	5	Qualification for the Challenge Cup
16	Zebre	3	0	0	3	52	116	−64	7	17	1	0	1	Qualification for the Challenge Cup

Updated to match(es) played on 4 October 2026. Source: UnitedRugby.com
Rules for classification: Tiebreakers for teams tied on points: 1) Number of matches won 2) The difference between points for and points against 3) The number of tries scored 4) The most points scored 5) The difference between tries for and tries against 6) The fewest red cards received 7) The fewest yellow cards received.

== Current squad ==
2026-27 Dragons squad
**Props**: (Wales) **Christian Coleman**; (South Africa) Robert Hunt; (Wales) **Rhodri Jones**; (Wales) **Wyn Jones**; (Wales) Dylan Kelleher-Griffiths; (Wales) **Dillon Lewis**; (Argentina) **Rodrigo Martínez**; **Hookers**: (Wales) Oli Burrows; (Wales) **Brodie Coghlan**; (Wales) **Elliot Dee**; (Wales) Sam Scarfe; **Locks**: (Wales) **Ben Carter** **(c)**; (Wales) **Seb Davies**; (England) Levi Douglas *; (Wales) Barny Langton-Cryer; (Wales) **Matthew Screech**	**Back row**: (Wales) Harrison Keddie; (Wales) **Shane Lewis-Hughes**; (New Zealand) Terrell Peita; (Wales) Ryan Woodman; (Wales) **Thomas Young**; **Scrum-halves**: (Samoa) **Ere Enari**; (Wales) Che Hope; (Wales) Morgan Lloyd; (Wales) **Rhodri Williams**; **Fly-halves**: (South Africa) Tinus de Beer; (Wales) Jac Lloyd	**Centres**: (Wales) Harri Ackerman; (Tonga) **Fine Inisi**; (Wales) Aneurin Owen; (Tonga) **Fetuli Paea**; (Wales) Joe Westwood; **Wings**: (Wales) **Rio Dyer**; (Wales) Harry Rees-Weldon; (Wales) David Richards; (Wales) Jared Rosser; (Tonga) **Anzelo Tuitavuki**; **Fullbacks**: (Wales) Huw Anderson; (Wales) **Cai Evans**; (Wales) Angus O'Brien
**(c)** denotes the team captain. **Bold** denotes internationally capped players. * denotes players qualified to play for Wales on residency or dual nationality. Taking into account signings and departures ahead of 2025–26 season as listed on List of 2025–26 United Rugby Championship transfers. Source:

=== Academy Squad ===
2026-27 Dragons Academy squad
**Props**: (Wales) Owain James; (Wales) Jordan Morris; **Locks**: (Wales) Nick Thomas	**Back row**: (Wales) Harry Beddall; (Wales) Owen Conquer; (Wales) Evan Minto; **Scrum-halves**: (Wales) Logan Franklin; **Fly-halves**: (Wales) Harri Ford	**Wings**: (Wales) Caio Parry; **Fullbacks**: (Wales) Oli Woodman
**(c)** denotes the team captain. **Bold** denotes internationally capped players. * denotes players qualified to play for Wales on residency or dual nationality. Taking into account signings and departures ahead of 2026-27 season as listed on List of 2026-27 United Rugby Championship transfers. Source:

=== Notable players ===
Michael Owen captained Wales in 2005–06 and he led Wales to their first Grand Slam for 27-years in the 2005 Six Nations Championship.

Lewis Evans has made over 200 appearances for the Dragons. Prop Adam Black became the first centurion in Dragons colours during the 2006–07 season. The following players have also made over one hundred Dragons appearances: Jamie Ringer, Peter Sidoli, Gareth Wyatt, Steve Jones, Luke Charteris, Wayne Evans, Aled Brew, Ashley Smith, Adam Jones, Hugh Gustafson, Jason Tovey, Robert Sidoli, Phil Price, Adam Hughes, Nic Cudd, Rynard Landman, Matthew Screech, Brok Harris, Lloyd Fairbrother, Jack Dixon, Elliot Dee, Ashton Hewitt, Joe Davies, Harrison Keddie, Rhodri Williams, Ollie Griffiths, Aaron Wainwright.

Many former players were capped by the Wales national rugby union team while with the region; props Chris Anthony, Rhys M. Thomas and Bradley Roberts, hookers Steve Jones, Lloyd Burns and Leon Brown, second rows Ian Gough, Luke Charteris, Andrew Coombs, Cory Hill and Will Rowlands, flankers Jason Forster, Richard Parks, Jamie Ringer, Gavin Thomas and Ross Moriarty, number eight Michael Owen and , Rhys Oakley, Taulupe Faletau, Dan Lydiate, Ollie Griffiths, Taine Basham and Aaron Wainwright, scrum halves Gareth Cooper and Andy Williams, outside half Ceri Sweeney, centres Andy Marinos, Tyler Morgan and Nick Tompkins, wingers Gareth Wyatt, Hal Luscombe, Aled Brew, Will Harries, Tom Prydie, Hallam Amos, Jonah Holmes and fullback Kevin Morgan. Percy Montgomery, Sione Tuʻipulotu, Rod Snow, Mike Hercus, Mike Petri, James Arlidge, Will Kelly, Mesake Doge, Gonzalo Bertranou and Aki Seiuli played internationally for their respective countries whilst with the region.

Of the current players Elliot Dee, Ben Carter, Rio Dyer, Matthew Screech, Cai Evans, Rhodri Williams, Christian Coleman, Brodie Coghlan and Dillon Lewis have featured in Wales test matches whilst with the region. Rhodri Jones, Shane Lewis-Hughes, Seb Davies, Wyn Jones and Thomas Young achieved Wales international caps before joining the Dragons.

=== British & Irish Lions ===
The following players have been selected to play for the British & Irish Lions touring squads while playing for the Dragons.

**Player**	**Tours**
(Wales) Michael Owen	2005 New Zealand
(Wales) Gareth Cooper	2005 New Zealand
(Wales) Dan Lydiate	2013 Australia
(Wales) Taulupe Faletau	2013 Australia
(Wales) Cory Hill	2017 New Zealand

== Coaching staff ==
Position	Name
Head coach	(New Zealand) Filo Tiatia
General Manager	(Wales) James Chapron
Skills Coach	(Wales) Matt O’Brien
Forwards Coach	(Wales) Sam Hobbs
Defence Coach	(New Zealand) Dale MacLeod

== Former coaches ==
Name	Years
(Wales) Mike Ruddock	2003–2004
(Ireland) Declan Kidney	2004
(Australia) Chris Anderson	2004–2005
(Wales) Paul Turner	2005–2011
(Wales) Darren Edwards	2011–2014
(Wales) Lyn Jones	2014
(Wales) Kingsley Jones	2014–2017
(Ireland) Bernard Jackman	2017–2018
(Wales) Ceri Jones (interim)	2018–2019
(England) Dean Ryan	2019–2022
(Wales) Dai Flanagan	2022–2024

== Results and statistics ==
=== Celtic League / Pro12 / Pro14 / United Rugby Championship ===
Season	Played	Win	Draw	Loss	BP	Points	Position
2003–04	22	16	0	6	8	72	3rd
2004–05	20	11	0	9	6	50	4th
2005–06	22	7	0	13	9	45	8th (Note: 11 teams were involved in this season, so one team did not play each week and were awarded four points instead. Therefore, each team finished the season with eight more points than the table would seem to warrant.)
2006–07	20	8	0	12	7	39	9th
2007–08	18	7	1	10	4	34	8th
2008–09	18	7	0	11	5	33	9th
2009–10	18	8	1	9	5	39	7th
2010–11	22	10	1	11	7	49	7th
2011–12	22	7	1	14	6	36	9th
2012–13	22	6	0	16	4	28	11th
2013–14	22	7	1	14	5	35	9th
2014–15	22	8	0	14	10	42	9th
2015–16	22	4	0	18	10	26	10th
2016–17	22	4	0	18	7	23	11th
2017–18	21	2	2	17	8	20	6th (Conference B) (Note: The competition was split into two conferences of 7 teams each following the increase from 12 to 14 teams.)
2018–19	21	5	1	15	4	26	6th (Conference B)
2019–20	15 (Note: Only 15 rounds were played during the 2019–20 season due to the COVID-19 pandemic in Europe.)	5	1	9	2	24	5th (Conference B)
2020–21	16 (Note: Only 16 rounds were played during the 2020–21 season due to the COVID-19 pandemic in Europe, with the remaining matches replaced by the Pro14 Rainbow Cup competition.)	6	0	10	5	29	5th (Conference A)
2021–22	18	2	1	15	9	19	15th
2022–23	18	4	0	14	8	24	15th
2023–24	18	3	0	15	4	16	15th
2024–25	18	1	0	17	5	9	16th
2025–26	18	3	4	11	8	28	15th

=== Celtic Cup ===
Season	Round	Match
2003–04	First round	Llanelli Scarlets 40 – 6 Newport Gwent Dragons
2004–05	Quarter-final	Newport Gwent Dragons 19 – 46 Llanelli Scarlets

=== Heineken Cup / European Rugby Champions Cup ===
Year	Pool	Pos	Played	Won	Drawn	Loss	Bonus	Pts
2003–04	1	4th	6	2	0	4	1	9
2004–05	5	3rd	6	3	0	3	3	15
2005–06	1	3rd	6	1	0	5	2	6
2007–08	1	3rd	6	1	0	5	4	8
2008–09	5	4th	6	1	0	5	3	7
2009–10	2	4th	6	1	0	5	2	6
2010–11	6	4th	6	0	0	6	2	2
2020–21	A	12th	2 (Note: Due to the COVID-19 pandemic in Europe, only two pool games were played during the 2020–21 season. The knockout stage commenced with a round of 16 consisting of the top eight teams from each pool.)	0	0	2	0	0

=== European Challenge Cup / European Rugby Challenge Cup ===
Year	Pool	Pos	Played	Won	Drawn	Loss	Bonus	Pts
2006–07	1	1st	6	5	0	1	5	25
2006–07	Quarter-final	Newport Gwent Dragons 39 – 17 Brive						
2006–07	Semi-final	Clermont Auvergne 46 – 29 Newport Gwent Dragons						
2011–12	4	3rd	6	3	0	3	3	15
2012–13	3	3rd	6	2	0	4	5	13
2013–14	2	2nd	6	3	0	3	2	14
2014–15	3	1st	6	5	0	1	5	25
2014–15	Quarter-final	Newport Gwent Dragons 25 – 21 Cardiff Blues						
2014–15	Semi-final	Edinburgh 45 – 16 Newport Gwent Dragons						
2015–16	2	2nd	6	4	0	2	4	20
2015–16	Quarter-final	Gloucester 21 – 23 Newport Gwent Dragons						
2015–16	Semi-final	Montpellier 22 – 12 Newport Gwent Dragons						
2016–17	3	2nd	6	3	0	3	2	14
2017–18	1	2nd	6	3	0	3	4	16
2018–19	1	3rd	6	2	0	4	2	10
2019–20	1	2nd	6	4	0	2	4	20
2019–20	Quarter-final	Bristol Bears 56 – 17 Dragons						
2020–21	Quarter-final	Dragons 39 – 43 Northampton Saints						
2021–22	B	5th	4	0	0	4	2	2
2022–23	B	5th	4	1	1	2	4	10
2022–23	Round of 16	Glasgow Warriors 73 – 33 Dragons						
2023–24	1	5th	4	1	0	3	3	7
2024–25	2	5th	4	1	0	3	1	5
2025–26	2	3rd	4	2	0	2	1	9
2025–26	Round of 16	Stade Français Paris 31 – 36 Dragons						
2025–26	Quarter-final	Zebre Parma 32 – 35 Dragons						
2025–26	Semi-final	Montpellier 18 – 12 Dragons						

=== Anglo-Welsh Cup ===
Season	Pool	Pos	Played	Won	Drawn	Loss	BP	Points
2005–06	D	3rd	3	2	0	1	0	8
2006–07	D	3rd	3	1	0	2	0	4
2007–08	A	4th	3	0	1	2	3	5
2008–09	A	3rd	3	1	0	2	1	5
2009–10	4	2nd	4	3	0	1	0	12
2010–11	2	1st	4	3	0	1	0	12
2010–11	Semi-final	Gloucester 45–17 Newport Gwent Dragons						
2011–12	4	4th	4	1	1	2	1	7
2012–13	1	3rd	4	2	0	2	0	8
2013–14	1	4th	4	1	0	3	0	4
2014–15	1	3rd	4	2	0	2	3	11
2016–17	1	3rd	4	1	0	3	1	5
2017–18	1	4th	4	2	0	2	1	9

== Honours ==
- Glasgow City Sevens
  - Champions (1): 2008
- Premiership Rugby Sevens Series
  - Champions (1): 2015
