= 2016–17 Scarlets season =

Scarlets
- 2016–17 season
- Head coach: (New Zealand) Wayne Pivac
- Chief executive: (Wales) Darran Phillips
- Chairman: (Wales) Nigel Short
- Pro12: Champions (3rd overall)
- European Rugby Champions Cup: Pool stage, 3rd
- Anglo-Welsh Cup: Pool stage, 4th
- Top try scorer: League: Steff Evans (13); All: Steff Evans (13)
- Top points scorer: League: Rhys Patchell (145); All: Rhys Patchell (201)
- Highest home attendance: 13,256 v Ospreys (6 May 2015)
- Lowest home attendance: 3,538 v Bath (11 November 2016)
- Average home attendance: 6,807

The 2016–17 season was the 14th season in the history of the Scarlets, a Welsh rugby union regional side based in Llanelli, Carmarthenshire. In this season, they won the Pro12 playoffs after finishing third in the league, and also competed in the Rugby Champions Cup and the Anglo-Welsh Cup. It was Wales international centre Jonathan Davies' first season back at the region after leaving for Clermont Auvergne in 2014. Scarlets also signed Welsh international Rhys Patchell, South African international Werner Kruger and New Zealander Johnny McNicholl ahead of the 2016–17 season, whilst Welsh internationals Rhodri Jones and Rhodri Williams, club stalwart Phil John and New Zealand international Regan King were among the players who left.

At the end of the season, Ken Owens, Jonathan Davies and Liam Williams were called up to the British & Irish Lions squad for the 2017 tour to New Zealand. Gareth Davies was later called up to the squad as injury cover, but did not play in any games.

== Pre-season and friendlies ==
Date	Opponents	H / A	Result F–A	Scorers	Attendance
13 August 2016	Exeter Chiefs	A	3–45	Penalty: Patchell	4,940
20 August 2016	Bath	H (Note: Although advertised as a home match, the friendly against Bath was held at Eirias Stadium as opposed to Parc y Scarlets)	17–32	Tries: Patchell c, Bulbring c Conversions: Patchell (2); Penalty: Patchell	

== Pro12 ==
=== Fixtures ===
Date	Opponents	H / A	Result F–A	Scorers	Attendance	Table position
3 September 2016	Munster	H	13–23	Try: G. Davies 32' c Conversion: Patchell 33'; Penalties: Patchell (2) 27', 48'	6,107	7th
9 September 2016	Edinburgh	A	9–20	Penalties: Patchell (3) 13', 29' 54'	2,650	11th
16 September 2016	Ulster	A	8–19	Try: Boyde 74' m Penalty: Patchell 47'	13,633	11th
24 September 2016	Connacht	H	17–8	Tries: L. Williams (2) 35' c, 65' c Conversions: Patchell (2) 36', 65'; Drop Goal: Patchell 70'	5,630	8th
1 October 2016	Benetton Treviso	A	22–6	Tries: Kruger 54' c, Van der Merwe 69' m, S. Evans 80' c Conversions: Patchell 54', Thomas 80'; Penalty: Patchell 43'	3,500	7th
8 October 2016	Newport Gwent Dragons	H	31–27	Tries: S. Evans (2) 3' c, 65' c, L. Williams 38' c, J. Evans 60' c Conversions: Patchell (4) 4', 38', 61', 66'; Penalty: Patchell 55'	6,358	7th
28 October 2016	Cardiff Blues	A	26–15	Tries: Shingler 8' c, J. Evans 11' c, Van der Merwe 25' c, Parkes 41' m Conversions: Patchell (3) 8', 11', 25'	9,442	6th
5 November 2016	Glasgow Warriors	H	27–3	Tries: Boyde (2) 15' c, 52' c, J. Evans 41' c Conversions: Patchell (3) 16', 41', 54'; Penalties: Patchell (2) 49', 56'	6,059	6th
25 November 2016	Leinster	H	38–29	Tries: McNicholl 7' c, Kruger 21' c, S. Evans 31' c, Boyde 42' c, Elias 51' c Conversions: Patchell (5) 8', 22', 32', 43', 53'; Penalties: D. Jones 71'	6,164	4th
3 December 2016	Zebre	A	31–24	Tries: J. Evans (2) 12' c, 50' m, Shingler 34' c, Van der Merwe 38' c, A. Thomas 45' m Conversions: Patchell (3) 13', 34', 40'	1,800	4th
27 December 2016	Ospreys	A	9–19	Penalties: Patchell (3) 17', 33', 38'	19,514	5th
1 January 2017	Cardiff Blues	H	15–10	Tries: Evans 11' m, S. Williams 46' c Conversion: Patchell 46'; Penalty: Patchell 30'	10,159	4th
6 January 2017	Ulster	H	16–13	Try: Penalty try 62' c Conversion: D. Jones 62'; Penalties: D. Jones (3) 11', 15', 53'	6,593	4th
10 February 2017	Glasgow Warriors	A	26–14	Tries: T. Williams 22' c, Ja. Davies 39' c Conversions: T. Williams 24', D. Jones 40+1'; Penalties: D. Jones (3) 7', 30', 55', Thomas 77'	7,166	4th
17 February 2017	Zebre	H	42–7	Tries: Evans 12' c, Shingler 28' c, T. Williams 33' c, Price 49' c, Penalty try 63' c, Boyde 72' c Conversions: D. Jones (5) 13', 29', 34', 50', 63', Thomas 73'	5,989	4th
24 February 2017	Munster	A	30–21	Tries: Parkes 57' c, McNicholl 59' c, T. Williams 63' c Conversions: D. Jones (3) 57', 60' 63'; Penalties: D. Jones (3) 2', 16', 52'	16,742	4th
4 March 2017	Leinster	A	9–45	Penalties: D. Jones (3) 4', 16', 29'	10,792	4th
24 March 2017	Edinburgh	H	26–10	Tries: Patchell (2) 2' m, 30' c, W. Jones 19' c, J. Davies 23' c Conversions: Patchell (3) 20', 24', 31'	6,637	5th
8 April 2017	Benetton Treviso	H	51–5	Tries: Van der Merwe (3) 5' m, 15' c, 66' c, Evans 8' m, 34' m, Owens 24' m, Price 42' c, A. Davies 69' c Conversions: D. Jones (2) 16', 43', Thomas (2) 67', 69'; Penalties: D. Jones 2'	6,080	4th
15 April 2017	Newport Gwent Dragons	A	21–16	Tries: Jo. Davies 59' c, L. Williams 71' m Conversion: Li. Williams 61'; Penalties: D. Jones (2) 26', 50', Li. Williams 67'	60,642	3rd
29 April 2017	Connacht	A	30–8	Tries: McNicholl 3' c, S. Evans 13' m, 25' m, L. Williams 30' m, Van der Merwe 77' m Conversion: Patchell 4'; Penalties: Patchell 65'	5,290	3rd
6 May 2017	Ospreys	H	40–17	Tries: Boyde 35' c, S. Evans 39' c, Shingler 61' c, McNicholl 73' m, Jo. Davies 75'; Conversions: Patchell (3) 37', 40', 62'; Penalties: Patchell (3) 8', 19', 25'	13,256	3rd

=== Table ===
Pos	Team	Pld	W	D	L	F	A	PD	BP	Pts
2	(Ireland) Leinster	22	18	0	4	674	390	284	13	85
3	(Wales) Scarlets	22	17	0	5	537	359	178	9	77
4	(Wales) Ospreys	22	14	0	8	556	360	196	13	69

=== Play-offs ===
Date	Round	Opponents	H / A	Result F–A	Scorers	Attendance
19 May 2017	Semi-final	Leinster	A	27–15	Tries: S. Evans 8' c, Shingler 25' c, G. Davies 29' c Conversions: Patchell (3) 9', 25', 30'; Penalties: L. Williams (2) 69', 79'	15,861
27 May 2017	Final	Munster	N	46–22	Tries: L. Williams 8' m, S. Evans 19' c, G. Davies 26' c, Beirne 30', Van der Merwe 69', Ja. Davies 79'; Conversions: Patchell (3) 20', 27', 31', Li. Williams (2) 71', 80+1'; Penalties: Patchell (2) 18', 44'	44,558

== European Champions Cup ==
=== Fixtures ===
Date	Opponents	H / A	Result F–A	Scorers	Attendance	Pool position
15 October 2016	Sale Sharks	H	28–11	Tries: G. Davies 13' c, Van der Merwe (2) 32' m, 57' c Conversions: Patchell (2) 13', 58'; Penalties: Patchell (3) 9', 16', 21'	6,521	1st
22 October 2016	Saracens	A	26–44	Tries: Shingler 59' c, Jo. Davies 72' c Conversions: Patchell (2) 60', 73'; Penalties: Patchell (4) 6', 14', 30', 40'	9,084	3rd
11 December 2016	RC Toulon	A	20–31	Tries: Owens 35' c, Barclay 78' c Conversions: Patchell (2) 36', 78'; Penalties: Patchell (2) 13', 23'	11,978	3rd
18 December 2016	RC Toulon	H	22–21	Try: S. Williams 14' c Conversion: Patchell 15'; Penalties: Patchell (5) 10', 18', 23', 44', 63'	8,579	3rd
15 January 2017	Saracens	H	22–22	Try: S. Williams 52' c Conversion: D. Jones 53'; Penalties: D. Jones (5) 8', 16', 35', 46', 63'	7,491	3rd
21 January 2017	Sale Sharks	A	22–25	Tries: Van der Merwe 39' c, Penalty try 63' c Conversions: D. Jones (2) 40', 63'; Penalties: D. Jones (3) 31', 55', 73'	4,275	3rd

=== Table ===
Team	Pld	W	D	L	F	A	PD	BP	Pts
(England) Saracens	6	5	1	0	181	87	90	2	24
(France) RC Toulon	6	3	0	3	120	100	20	3	16
(Wales) Scarlets	6	2	1	3	141	154	-13	1	11
(England) Sale Sharks	6	1	0	5	66	167	-101	0	4

== Anglo-Welsh Cup ==
=== Fixtures ===
Date	Opponents	H / A	Result F–A	Scorers	Attendance	Pool position
11 November 2016	Bath	H	44–21	Tries: Macleod 53' c, T. Phillips 64' c, E. Phillips 67' c, Condy (2) 76' c, 79' c Conversions: D. Jones (4) 54', 65', 68', 77', McBryde 80'; Penalties: D. Jones (3) 6', 21', 32'	3,538	1st
18 November 2016	Newport Gwent Dragons	A	21–36	Tries: D. Hughes 40' c, Baldwin 63' m Conversion: D. Jones 40+1'; Penalties: D. Jones (3) 5', 13', 24'	3,539	3rd
27 January 2017	Saracens	H	17–32	Tries: Allen 53' c, McBryde 66' c, Conversions: Maynard 53', McBryde 66'; Penalty: Maynard 43'	3,796	3rd
4 February 2017	Northampton Saints	A	10–50	Try: T. Williams 12' c Conversion: McBryde 13'; Penalty: McBryde 3'	13,177	3rd

=== Table ===
Team	Pld	W	D	L	F	A	PD	BP	Pts
Leicester Tigers	4	3	0	1	110	72	38	1	13
Gloucester	4	2	1	1	90	81	9	2	12
Newcastle Falcons	4	2	0	2	68	74	−6	0	8
Scarlets	4	1	0	3	92	139	−47	1	5

== Statistics ==
(+ in the Apps column denotes substitute appearance, positions listed are the ones they have started a game in during the season)

Pos.	Name	Pro12						European Champions Cup						Anglo-Welsh Cup						Total						Discipline	
Pos.	Name	Apps	Try	Con	Pen	Drop	Pts	Apps	Try	Con	Pen	Drop	Pts	Apps	Try	Con	Pen	Drop	Pts	Apps	Try	Con	Pen	Drop	Pts	Yellow card	Red card
FB	(Wales) Dion Jones	0	0	0	0	0	0	0	0	0	0	0	0	2	0	0	0	0	0	2	0	0	0	0	0	0	0
FB/WG	(Wales) Liam Williams	14+1	6	3	3	0	45	5	0	0	0	0	0	0	0	0	0	0	0	19+1	6	3	3	0	45	0	0
FB/WG	(Wales) Tom Williams	4	3	1	0	0	17	0+1	0	0	0	0	0	3	1	0	0	0	5	7+1	4	1	0	0	22	0	0
WG/FB	(New Zealand) Johnny McNicholl	15	4	0	0	0	20	1	0	0	0	0	0	0	0	0	0	0	0	16	4	0	0	0	20	0	0
WG	(Wales) Steff Evans	20+1	13	0	0	0	65	6	0	0	0	0	0	0	0	0	0	0	0	26+1	13	0	0	0	65	1	1
WG	(Canada) D. T. H. van der Merwe	11+6	8	0	0	0	40	5	3	0	0	0	15	0	0	0	0	0	0	16+6	11	0	0	0	55	0	0
WG	(Wales) Ryan Conbeer	0	0	0	0	0	0	0	0	0	0	0	0	1	0	0	0	0	0	1	0	0	0	0	0	0	0
WG	(Wales) Corey Baldwin	0	0	0	0	0	0	0	0	0	0	0	0	2	1	0	0	0	5	2	1	0	0	0	5	0	0
WG	(Wales) Morgan Griffiths	0	0	0	0	0	0	0	0	0	0	0	0	1	0	0	0	0	0	1	0	0	0	0	0	0	0
WG	(Wales) Ashley Evans	0	0	0	0	0	0	0	0	0	0	0	0	0+1	0	0	0	0	0	0+1	0	0	0	0	0	0	0
WG/CE	(Wales) Richard Smith	0	0	0	0	0	0	0	0	0	0	0	0	3+1	0	0	0	0	0	3+1	0	0	0	0	0	0	0
CE/WG	(New Zealand) Hadleigh Parkes	19+5	2	0	0	0	10	5	0	0	0	0	0	0	0	0	0	0	0	24+5	2	0	0	0	10	0	0
CE/WG	(Wales) Ioan Nicholas	0+3	0	0	0	0	0	0	0	0	0	0	0	2	0	0	0	0	0	2+3	0	0	0	0	0	0	0
CE	(Wales) Scott Williams	11+3	1	0	0	0	5	4	2	0	0	0	10	0	0	0	0	0	0	15+3	2	0	0	0	15	0	0
CE	(Wales) Jonathan Davies	12+1	2	0	0	0	10	3+1	1	0	0	0	5	0	0	0	0	0	0	15+2	3	0	0	0	15	0	0
CE	(Wales) Steffan Hughes	6+6	0	0	0	0	0	0+2	0	0	0	0	0	1	0	0	0	0	0	7+8	0	0	0	0	0	0	0
CE	(Wales) Gareth Owen	2+3	0	0	0	0	0	0+1	0	0	0	0	0	3	0	0	0	0	0	5+4	0	0	0	0	0	0	0
CE	(Wales) Rhodri Jones	0	0	0	0	0	0	0	0	0	0	0	0	1	0	0	0	0	0	1	0	0	0	0	0	0	0
FH/FB	(Wales) Aled Thomas	7+7	1	4	0	0	13	1+1	0	0	0	0	0	0	0	0	0	0	0	8+8	1	4	0	0	13	0	0
FH	(Wales) Rhys Patchell	17	2	36	20	1	145	4	0	7	14	0	56	0	0	0	0	0	0	21	2	40	36	1	201	0	0
FH	(Wales) Dan Jones	7+8	0	12	16	0	72	2+2	0	3	8	0	30	2	0	5	6	0	28	11+10	0	20	30	0	130	1	0
FH	(Wales) Jack Maynard	0	0	0	0	0	0	0	0	0	0	0	0	1+3	0	1	1	0	5	1+3	0	1	1	0	5	0	0
FH	(Wales) Billy McBryde	0	0	0	0	0	0	0	0	0	0	0	0	1+3	1	3	1	0	14	1+3	1	3	1	0	14	0	0
SH	(Wales) Gareth Davies	9+5	3	0	0	0	15	5	1	0	0	0	5	0	0	0	0	0	0	14+5	4	0	0	0	20	0	0
SH	(Wales) Jonathan Evans	10+8	5	0	0	0	25	0+3	0	0	0	0	0	0	0	0	0	0	0	10+11	5	0	0	0	25	0	0
SH	(Wales) Aled Davies	4+10	1	0	0	0	5	1+1	0	0	0	0	0	2	0	0	0	0	0	7+11	1	0	0	0	5	0	0
SH	(Wales) Declan Smith	0+1	0	0	0	0	0	0	0	0	0	0	0	1+2	0	0	0	0	0	1+3	0	0	0	0	0	0	0
SH	(Wales) Connor Lloyd	0	0	0	0	0	0	0	0	0	0	0	0	1+1	0	0	0	0	0	1+1	0	0	0	0	0	0	0
SH	(Wales) Rhodri Cole	0	0	0	0	0	0	0	0	0	0	0	0	0+1	0	0	0	0	0	0+1	0	0	0	0	0	0	0
N8	(Wales) Morgan Allen	1+4	0	0	0	0	0	0	0	0	0	0	0	4	1	0	0	0	5	5+4	1	0	0	0	5	0	0
N8/FL	(Wales) Josh Macleod	3+8	0	0	0	0	0	0+1	0	0	0	0	0	3	1	0	0	0	5	6+9	1	0	0	0	5	0	0
N8/FL	(Wales) Jack Condy	0	0	0	0	0	0	0	0	0	0	0	0	3+1	2	0	0	0	10	3+1	2	0	0	0	10	0	1
FL/N8	(Scotland) John Barclay	13+1	0	0	0	0	0	6	1	0	0	0	5	0	0	0	0	0	0	19+1	0	0	0	0	5	0	0
FL/N8	(Wales) Will Boyde	13+5	6	0	0	0	30	2+4	0	0	0	0	0	0	0	0	0	0	0	15+9	6	0	0	0	25	1	0
FL	(Wales) Aaron Shingler	20	4	0	0	0	20	5	1	0	0	0	5	0	0	0	0	0	0	25	5	0	0	0	25	0	0
FL	(Wales) James Davies	18+1	1	0	0	0	5	4	0	0	0	0	0	0	0	0	0	0	0	22+1	1	0	0	0	5	1	0
FL	(Wales) Tom Phillips	0+1	0	0	0	0	0	0	0	0	0	0	0	1+3	1	0	0	0	5	1+4	1	0	0	0	5	0	0
FL	(Wales) Shaun Evans	0	0	0	0	0	0	0	0	0	0	0	0	1	0	0	0	0	0	1	0	0	0	0	0	0	0
LK/FL	(Wales) Lewis Rawlins	10+6	0	0	0	0	0	0+4	0	0	0	0	0	0	0	0	0	0	0	10+10	0	0	0	0	0	0	0
LK/FL	(Ireland) Tadhg Beirne	13+5	0	0	0	0	0	4	0	0	0	0	0	2	0	0	0	0	0	19+5	0	0	0	0	0	0	0
LK	(Wales) Jake Ball	11	0	0	0	0	0	6	0	0	0	0	0	0	0	0	0	0	0	17	0	0	0	0	0	3	0
LK	(South Africa) David Bulbring	8+6	0	0	0	0	0	2	0	0	0	0	0	0	0	0	0	0	0	10+6	0	0	0	0	0	1	0
LK	(South Africa) Rynier Bernardo	0+3	0	0	0	0	0	0	0	0	0	0	0	4	0	0	0	0	0	4+3	0	0	0	0	0	0	0
LK	(England) Tom Price	10+3	0	0	0	0	0	1+2	0	0	0	0	0	0	0	0	0	0	0	11+5	0	0	0	0	0	0	0
LK	(Wales) Josh Helps	0	0	0	0	0	0	0	0	0	0	0	0	2	0	0	0	0	0	2	0	0	0	0	0	0	0
LK	(Wales) Phil Day	0	0	0	0	0	0	0	0	0	0	0	0	0+2	0	0	0	0	0	0+2	0	0	0	0	0	0	0
HK	(Wales) Ken Owens	12	1	0	0	0	5	5	0	0	0	0	0	0	0	0	0	0	0	17	1	0	0	0	5	0	0
HK	(Wales) Ryan Elias	11+10	1	0	0	0	5	1+5	0	0	0	0	0	0	0	0	0	0	0	12+15	1	0	0	0	5	0	0
HK	(Wales) Emyr Phillips	1+10	0	0	0	0	0	0+1	0	0	0	0	0	2	1	0	0	0	5	3+11	1	0	0	0	5	0	0
HK	(Wales) Taylor Davies	0	0	0	0	0	0	0	0	0	0	0	0	0+1	0	0	0	0	0	0+1	0	0	0	0	0	0	0
HK	(Wales) Dafydd Hughes	0+1	0	0	0	0	0	0	0	0	0	0	0	2	1	0	0	0	5	2+1	1	0	0	0	5	0	0
HK	(Wales) Torin Myhill	0	0	0	0	0	0	0	0	0	0	0	0	0+2	0	0	0	0	0	0+2	0	0	0	0	0	0	0
PR	(South Africa) Werner Kruger	13+10	1	0	0	0	5	1+5	0	0	0	0	0	0	0	0	0	0	0	14+15	1	0	0	0	5	1	0
PR	(Australia) Dylan Evans	1+3	0	0	0	0	0	0	0	0	0	0	0	3	0	0	0	0	0	4+3	0	0	0	0	0	0	0
PR	(Wales) Wyn Jones	15+8	0	0	0	0	0	3+2	0	0	0	0	0	0	0	0	0	0	0	18+10	0	0	0	0	0	2	0
PR	(Wales) Peter Edwards	0+7	0	0	0	0	0	0	0	0	0	0	0	1+1	0	0	0	0	0	1+8	0	0	0	0	0	0	0
PR	(Wales) Luke Garrett	0+8	0	0	0	0	0	0+2	0	0	0	0	0	0+1	0	0	0	0	0	0+11	0	0	0	0	0	0	0
PR	(Wales) Samson Lee	11+1	0	0	0	0	0	5+1	0	0	0	0	0	0	0	0	0	0	0	16+2	0	0	0	0	0	0	0
PR	(Wales) Nicky Thomas	0+5	0	0	0	0	0	0	0	0	0	0	0	2+1	0	0	0	0	0	2+6	0	0	0	0	0	0	0
PR	(Wales) Simon Gardiner	0	0	0	0	0	0	0	0	0	0	0	0	0+1	0	0	0	0	0	0+1	0	0	0	0	0	0	0
PR	(Wales) Rob Evans	8+3	0	0	0	0	0	3+1	0	0	0	0	0	0	0	0	0	0	0	11+3	0	0	0	0	0	1	0
PR	(Wales) Gethin Robinson	0	0	0	0	0	0	0	0	0	0	0	0	1+1	0	0	0	0	0	1+1	0	0	0	0	0	0	0
PR	(Wales) Javan Sebastian	0	0	0	0	0	0	0	0	0	0	0	0	1	0	0	0	0	0	1	0	0	0	0	0	0	0
PR	(Wales) Rhys Fawcett	0	0	0	0	0	0	0	0	0	0	0	0	0+1	0	0	0	0	0	0+1	0	0	0	0	0	0	0
PR	(Wales) Berian Watkins	0	0	0	0	0	0	0	0	0	0	0	0	0+1	0	0	0	0	0	0+1	0	0	0	0	0	0	0

Stats accurate as of match played 27 May 2017

== Transfers ==
=== In ===
Date confirmed	Pos.	Name	From	Contract length
13 November 2015	CE	(Wales) Jonathan Davies	(France) Clermont Auvergne	
15 December 2015	FH	(Wales) Rhys Patchell	(Wales) Cardiff Blues	2 years
17 February 2016	PR	(South Africa) Werner Kruger	(South Africa) Bulls	3 years
22 February 2016	SH	(Wales) Jonathan Evans	(England) Bath	2 years
13 April 2016	WG	(New Zealand) Johnny McNicholl	(New Zealand) Crusaders	3 years
3 May 2016	WG	(Wales) Tom Williams	(Wales) Cardiff Blues	2 years
15 June 2016	LK	(South Africa) Rynier Bernardo	(Wales) Ospreys	
28 June 2016	LK	(Ireland) Tadhg Beirne	(Ireland) Leinster	
29 June 2016	WG/CE	(Wales) Richard Smith	(Wales) Cardiff Blues	
5 September 2016	PR	(Wales) Luke Garrett	(Wales) Newport Gwent Dragons	Loan
19 October 2016	PR	(Wales) Nicky Thomas	(England) Gloucester	2 Years

=== Out ===
Date confirmed	Pos.	Name	To
1 February 2016	SH	(Wales) Rhodri Williams	(England) Bristol
16 February 2016	PR	(Wales) Rhodri Jones	(Wales) Ospreys
4 March 2016	FH	(Wales) Steven Shingler	(Wales) Cardiff Blues
16 March 2016	LK	(Samoa) Maselino Paulino	(France) Lyon
4 April 2016	HK	(Wales) Kirby Myhill	(Wales) Cardiff Blues
4 April 2016	LK	(South Africa) George Earle	(Wales) Cardiff Blues
5 April 2016	FB	(Wales) Jordan Williams	(England) Bristol
28 April 2016	WG	(Wales) Harry Robinson	Retired
6 May 2016	CE	(New Zealand) Regan King	(England) Jersey Reds
6 May 2016	SH	(Wales) Kieran Hardy	(England) Jersey Reds
10 May 2016	LK	(Wales) Jack Jones	Released
20 May 2016	WG	(Fiji) Michael Tagicakibau	(Italy) Treviso
7 June 2016	PR	(Wales) Ben Leung	(Wales) Cardiff
10 June 2016	FH	(Wales) Josh Lewis	(Wales) Ebbw Vale
2 August 2016	HK	(Wales) Torin Myhill	(Wales) Carmarthen Quins
2 August 2016	SH	(Wales) Connor Lloyd	(Wales) Carmarthen Quins
6 August 2016	CE	(New Zealand) Michael Collins	(New Zealand) Otago
23 August 2016	PR	(Australia) Jack Payne	(Australia) Western Sydney Rams
7 November 2016	PR	(Wales) Phil John	(Wales) RGC 1404
