= 2017–18 Scarlets season =

Scarlets
- 2017–18 season
- Head coach: Wayne Pivac
- Chief executive: Darran Phillips
- Chairman: Nigel Short
- Pro 14: Runners-up
- European Rugby Champions Cup: Semi-finals
- Anglo-Welsh Cup: Pool stage, 4th
- Top try scorer: League: Johnny McNicholl (9); All: Johnny McNicholl (11)
- Top points scorer: League: Leigh Halfpenny (101); All: Leigh Halfpenny (169)
- Highest home attendance: 15,373 vs. La Rochelle (30 March 2018)
- Lowest home attendance: 3,021 vs. Sale Sharks (2 February 2018)
- Average home attendance: 9,129
Home colours	Away colours

The 2017–18 season is the 15th season in the history of the Scarlets, a Welsh rugby union regional side based in Llanelli, Carmarthenshire. This season, they are competing in the newly revamped Pro14 as the defending champions, the Rugby Champions Cup and the Anglo-Welsh Cup. This season, Welsh international Liam Williams and Canadian international D. T. H. van der Merwe departed the club, while Welsh internationals Leigh Halfpenny and Tom Prydie and Australia Sevens international Paul Asquith were among the new arrivals.

== Pre-season and friendlies ==
Date	Opponents	H / A	Result F–A	Scorers	Attendance
12 August 2017	Scarlets Premiership Select	H (Note: Although advertised as a home game, the match against the Premiership Select was played at Llandovery's Church Bank)	82–12	Tries: Asquith (3) 4' c, 56' c, 70' c, Conbeer (2) 7' c, 42' m, Sh. Evans 19' c, Penalty try 30', Grabham 38' c, M. Williams 47' c, Boyde 49' c, D. Hughes (2) 53' c, 76' c Conversions: R. Jones (10) 4', 7', 19', 38', 47', 49', 52', 56', 70', 76',	
19 August 2017	Bristol	A	33–26	Tries: M. Williams (2) 8' m, 28' c, Elias 64' c, St. Evans 73' c, Patchell 80' c Conversions: D. Jones 28', Patchell (3) 64', 73', 80'	
25 August 2017	Gloucester	A	21–40	Tries: G. Davies 37' c, R. Evans 77' c, A. Davies 79' c Conversions: Patchell 37', R. Jones (2) 77', 79'	

== Pro 14 ==
=== Fixtures ===
Date	Opponents	H / A	Result F–A	Scorers	Attendance	Table position
2 September 2017	Southern Kings	H	57–10	Tries: McNicholl (2) 8' m, 73' c, Halfpenny 22' c, Patchell 46' c, Ball 50' c, E. Phillips 62' c, Parkes 69' c, St. Evans 77' c Conversions: Halfpenny (3) 23', 47', 51', Patchell (4) 63', 69', 74', 78'; Penalty: Halfpenny 36'	9,108	1st
9 September 2017	Zebre	A	41–10	Tries: McNicholl 9' c, St. Evans 48' c, Asquith 63' c, Beirne 69' c, A. Davies 75' c Conversions: Patchell (5) 10', 48', 64', 70', 76'; Penalties: Patchell (2) 5', 27'	2,800	1st
15 September 2017	Ulster	A	20–27	Tries: McNicholl 60' c, Jo. Davies 67' c Conversions: Halfpenny (2) 62', 68'; Penalties: Halfpenny (2) 3', 57'	12,712	2nd
23 September 2017	Edinburgh	H	28–8	Tries: Patchell 19' c, G. Davies 30' c, Kruger 46' c, Shingler 62' c Conversions: Halfpenny (4) 21', 32', 47', 63'	8,088	2nd
29 September 2017	Connacht	H	36–27	Tries: McNicholl 7' c, St. Evans 17' m, Patchell 24' c, Halfpenny 38' c, Beirne 77' c Conversions: Halfpenny (4) 8', 26', 39', 79'; Penalty: Halfpenny 57'	7,693	1st
7 October 2017	Ospreys	A	19–18	Tries: G. Davies (2) 42' m, 49' c, Lee 61' c Conversions: Patchell (2) 50', 62'	12,093	1st
28 October 2017	Cardiff Blues	H	30–17	Tries: Parkes 6' m, Elias 32' c, J. Evans 60' m, St. Evans 69' c Conversions: Halfpenny 34', Patchell 70'; Penalties: Halfpenny (2) 1', 14'	9,003	1st
3 November 2017	Benetton	H	20–8	Tries: D. Jones 13' c, S. Williams 68' c Conversions: D. Jones (2) 14', 69'; Penalties: D. Jones (2) 5', 34'	8,007	1st
26 November 2017	Southern Kings	A	34–30	Tries: Beirne 4', Nicholas 50' c, Kruger 56' c, D. Jones 69' c Conversions: D. Jones (4) 5', 52', 57' 70'; Penalties: D. Jones (2) 34', 61'	3,619	1st
2 December 2017	Cheetahs	A	21–28	Tries: J. Davies 36' m, Nicholas 62' c Conversion: D. Jones 62'; Penalties: D. Jones (2) 4', 18', Prydie 75'	3,457	1st
26 December 2017	Ospreys	H	12–9	Tries: St. Evans 17' m, Macleod 80+1' c Conversion: Halfpenny 80+3	14,509	1st
31 December 2017	Cardiff Blues	A	14–11	Tries: Prydie 12' c, Patchell 43' c Conversions: Halfpenny (2) 14', 45'	11,700	1st
5 January 2018	Dragons	H	47–13	Tries: J. Davies 16' c, Prydie 27' m, D. Jones 30' c, A. Davies 51' c, Shingler 53' c, Boyde 61' c, R. Jones 65' c Conversions: D. Jones (4) 17', 31', 51', 54', Patchell (2) 63', 66'	9,347	1st
11 February 2018	Benetton	A	12–22	Tries: Baldwin 63' c, Beirne 77' m Conversion: D. Jones 64'	3,000	2nd
17 February 2018	Leinster	A	13–20	Try: McNicholl 11' c Conversion: D. Jones 12'; Penalties: D. Jones (2) 58', 80'	14,916	2nd
24 February 2018	Ulster	H	34–10	Tries: Nicholas 43' c, Conbeer 57' c, Asquith 64' c, Beirne 76' c Conversions: D. Jones (4) 44', 58', 65', 76'; Penalties: D. Jones (2) 9', 55'	6,941	2nd
9 March 2018	Leinster	H	10–10	Try: Asquith 64' c Conversion: D. Jones 65'; Penalty: D. Jones 80+1'	9,108	2nd
24 March 2018	Munster	A	7–19	Try: A. Davies 6' c Conversion: Patchell 7'	14,215	2nd
7 April 2018	Glasgow	H	26–8	Tries: Patchell (2) 27' m, 78' c, G. Davies 54' m Conversion: Halfpenny 80'; Penalties: Halfpenny (3) 33', 53', 59'	10,076	2nd
14 April 2018	Edinburgh	A	14–52	Tries: D. Jones 27' c, Varndell 32' c Conversions: D. Jones (2) 28', 33'	3,849	2nd
28 April 2018	Dragons	A	33–8	Tries: Elias 5' c, Penalty try 46', Beirne (2) 50' m, 55' c, St. Evans 74' c Conversions: Halfpenny (3) 6', 56', 75'	62,338	2nd

=== Table ===
Conference B

Pos	Team	Pld	W	D	L	F	A	PD	BP	Pts
1	(Ireland) Leinster	21	14	1	6	601	374	+227	12	70
2	(Wales) Scarlets	21	14	1	6	528	365	+163	12	70
3	(Scotland) Edinburgh	21	15	0	6	494	375	+119	8	68

=== Play-offs ===
Date	Round	Opponents	H / A	Result F–A	Scorers	Attendance
5 May 2018	Quarter-final	Cheetahs	H	43–8	Tries: St. Evans (2) 5' c, 36' c, Halfpenny 16' c, Prydie 44' c, J. Davies 54' c, J. Evans 60' m Conversions: Halfpenny (2) 6', 17', Patchell (3) 37', 44', 56'; Penalty: Halfpenny 15'	7,105
18 May 2018	Semi-final	Glasgow Warriors	A	28–13	Tries: Patchell 3' c, G. Davies 16' c, R. Evans 31' c, Owens 47' c Conversions: Patchell (4) 4', 17', 32', 48'	10,000
25 May 2018	Final	Leinster	N	32–40	Tries: McNicholl (3) 34' m, 64' c, 80' c, Kruger 78' c Conversions: Halfpenny (2) 64', 80+1', D. Jones 78'; Penalties: Halfpenny (2) 8', 12'	46,092

== European Champions Cup ==
=== Group stage ===
==== Fixtures ====
Date	Opponents	H / A	Result F–A	Scorers	Attendance	Pool position
15 October 2017	Toulon	A	20–21	Tries: McNicholl 41' c, Halfpenny 48' c Conversions: Halfpenny (2) 42', 50'; Penalties: Halfpenny (2) 32', 59'	13,882	3rd
20 October 2017	Bath	H	13–18	Try: St. Evans 22' c Conversion: Halfpenny 22'; Penalties: Halfpenny (2) 8', 73'	11,479	3rd
9 December 2017	Benetton	H	33–28	Tries: G. Davies (2) 2' c, 5' c, Beirne 26' c, St. Evans 75' c, Asquith 78' m Conversions: Halfpenny (3) 2', 6', 27', Patchell 76'	6,856	3rd
16 December 2017	Benetton	A	31–12	Tries: McNicholl 12' c, Asquith 23' c, G. Davies (2) 36' c, 43' c Conversions: Halfpenny (4) 14', 24', 37', 45'; Penalty: Halfpenny 8'	2,600	3rd
12 January 2018	Bath	A	35–17	Tries: Beirne 10' c, Asquith 24' m, Parkes 31 c', S. Williams 50' c Conversions: D. Jones (3) 11', 31', 52'; Penalties: D. Jones (3) 39', 68', 79'	13,822	1st
20 January 2018	Toulon	H	30–27	Tries: Prydie 2' c, Parkes 18' c, D. Jones 34' c Penalties: D. Jones (3) 3', 20', 34'; Penalties: D. Jones (2) 9', 24', Patchell 48'	14,476	1st

==== Table ====
Team	Pld	W	D	L	F	A	PD	BP	Pts
(Wales) Scarlets	6	4	0	2	162	123	+39	5	21
(France) Toulon	6	4	0	2	159	125	+34	3	19
(England) Bath	6	4	0	2	151	121	+30	2	18
(Italy) Benetton	6	0	0	6	97	200	−103	4	4

=== Knockout stage ===
Date	Round	Opponents	H / A	Result F–A	Scorers	Attendance
30 March 2018	Quarter-final	La Rochelle	H	29–17	Tries: Patchell 60' c, S. Williams 75' c Conversions: Halfpenny (2) 62', 76'; Penalties: Halfpenny (5) 4', 11', 18', 25', 45'	15,373
21 April 2018	Semi-final	Leinster	N	16–38	Try: Beirne 78' c Conversion: Patchell 79'; Penalties: Halfpenny (3) 5', 21', 33'	48,455

== Anglo-Welsh Cup ==
=== Fixtures ===
Date	Opponents	H / A	Result F–A	Scorers	Attendance	Table position
12 November 2017	Exeter Chiefs	H	0–40		5,011	4th
17 November 2017	Dragons	A	18–23	Tries: T. Lewis 15' c, Rho. Jones 17' c Conversions: McBryde 18'; Penalties: McBryde (2) 39', 67'	3,917	4th
27 January 2018	Harlequins	A	7–35	Try: Morgan 73' c Conversion: Maynard	9,305	4th
2 February 2018	Sale Sharks	H	18–45	Tries: J. Price 5' m, Rees 37' c Conversion: Maynard 38'; Penalties: Maynard (2) 23', 28'	3,021	4th

=== Table ===
Team	Pld	W	D	L	F	A	PD	BP	Pts
Northampton Saints	4	3	0	1	129	80	+49	3	15
Worcester Warriors	4	1	0	3	116	123	−7	4	8
Saracens	4	1	0	3	111	123	−12	4	8
Scarlets	4	0	0	4	43	143	−100	1	1

== Statistics ==
(+ in the Apps column denotes substitute appearance, positions listed are the ones they have started a game in during the season)

Pos.	Name	Pro 12						European Champions Cup						Anglo-Welsh Cup						Total						Discipline	
Pos.	Name	Apps	Try	Con	Pen	Drop	Pts	Apps	Try	Con	Pen	Drop	Pts	Apps	Try	Con	Pen	Drop	Pts	Apps	Try	Con	Pen	Drop	Pts	Yellow card	Red card
FB	(Wales) Leigh Halfpenny	11	3	25	12	0	101	6+1	1	12	13	0	68	0	0	0	0	0	0	17+1	4	37	26	0	169	0	0
FB	(Wales) Morgan Williams	0+3	0	0	0	0	0	0	0	0	0	0	0	1	0	0	0	0	0	1+3	0	0	0	0	0	0	0
FB	(Wales) Tomi Lewis	0	0	0	0	0	0	0	0	0	0	0	0	1	1	0	0	0	5	1	1	0	0	0	5	0	0
FB	(Wales) Dale Ford	0	0	0	0	0	0	0	0	0	0	0	0	0+1	0	0	0	0	0	0+1	0	0	0	0	0	0	0
FB	(Wales) Tom Williams	3+2	0	0	0	0	0	0	0	0	0	0	0	2	0	0	0	0	0	5+2	0	0	0	0	0	0	0
WG/FB	(New Zealand) Johnny McNicholl	15	9	0	0	0	45	4	2	0	0	0	10	0	0	0	0	0	0	19	11	0	0	0	55	0	0
WG	(Wales) Steff Evans	14	8	0	0	0	40	6	2	0	0	0	10	0	0	0	0	0	0	20	10	0	0	0	50	0	1
WG	(Wales) Tom Grabham	1	0	0	0	0	0	0	0	0	0	0	0	0	0	0	0	0	0	1	0	0	0	0	0	0	0
WG	(Wales) Tom Prydie	9+2	3	0	1	0	18	2+1	1	0	0	0	5	0	0	0	0	0	0	11+3	4	0	1	0	23	0	0
WG	(Wales) Morgan Griffiths	0	0	0	0	0	0	0	0	0	0	0	0	3+1	0	0	0	0	0	3+1	0	0	0	0	0	0	0
WG	(Wales) Tom Rogers	0+1	0	0	0	0	0	0	0	0	0	0	0	3	0	0	0	0	0	3+1	0	0	0	0	0	0	0
WG	(Wales) Ryan Conbeer	2+1	1	0	0	0	5	0	0	0	0	0	0	1	0	0	0	0	0	3+1	1	0	0	0	5	0	0
WG	(Wales) Jac Price	0	0	0	0	0	0	0	0	0	0	0	0	1	1	0	0	0	5	1	1	0	0	0	5	0	0
WG	(England) Tom Varndell	2+1	1	0	0	0	5	0	0	0	0	0	0	0	0	0	0	0	0	2+1	1	0	0	0	5	0	0
CE/WG	(Australia) Paul Asquith	10+6	3	0	0	0	15	5+2	3	0	0	0	15	0	0	0	0	0	0	15+8	6	0	0	0	30	0	0
CE/WG	(Wales) Ioan Nicholas	10	3	0	0	0	15	0	0	0	0	0	0	1	0	0	0	0	0	11	3	0	0	0	15	0	0
CE/WG	(Wales) Corey Baldwin	1+3	1	0	0	0	5	0	0	0	0	0	0	1	0	0	0	0	0	2+3	1	0	0	0	5	0	0
CE	(New Zealand) Hadleigh Parkes	15	1	0	0	0	5	6+2	1	0	0	0	5	0	0	0	0	0	0	21+2	2	0	0	0	10	0	0
CE	(Wales) Scott Williams	14+1	1	0	0	0	5	6+1	2	0	0	0	10	0	0	0	0	0	0	20+2	3	0	0	0	15	0	0
CE	(Wales) Jonathan Davies	3+1	1	0	0	0	5	2	0	0	0	0	0	0	0	0	0	0	0	5+1	1	0	0	0	5	0	0
CE	(Wales) Steffan Hughes	8+6	0	0	0	0	0	0+4	0	0	0	0	0	0	0	0	0	0	0	8+10	0	0	0	0	0	0	0
CE	(Wales) Rhodri Jones	0	0	0	0	0	0	0	0	0	0	0	0	3	1	0	0	0	5	3	1	0	0	0	5	0	0
CE	(Wales) Scott Lloyd	0	0	0	0	0	0	0	0	0	0	0	0	1+2	0	0	0	0	0	1+2	0	0	0	0	0	0	0
CE	(Wales) Billy McBryde	0	0	0	0	0	0	0	0	0	0	0	0	1	0	1	2	0	8	1	0	1	2	0	8	0	0
CE	(Wales) Tom Hughes	0	0	0	0	0	0	0	0	0	0	0	0	1	0	0	0	0	0	1	0	0	0	0	0	0	0
CE	(Wales) Oli Ryland	0	0	0	0	0	0	0	0	0	0	0	0	0+1	0	0	0	0	0	0+1	0	0	0	0	0	0	0
FH/FB	(Wales) Rhys Patchell	15+1	7	22	2	0	80	7	1	2	1	0	12	0	0	0	0	0	0	22+1	8	24	3	0	92	1	0
FH/FB	(Wales) Rhys Jones	1+5	1	0	0	0	5	0	0	0	0	0	0	0	0	0	0	0	0	1+5	1	0	0	0	5	0	0
FH	(Wales) Dan Jones	11+7	4	21	11	0	95	4+1	1	6	5	0	32	0	0	0	0	0	0	15+8	5	27	16	0	127	0	0
FH	(Wales) Jack Maynard	0	0	0	0	0	0	0	0	0	0	0	0	3+1	0	2	2	0	10	3+1	0	2	2	0	10	0	0
FH	(New Zealand) Jacob Botica	0	0	0	0	0	0	0	0	0	0	0	0	1	0	0	0	0	0	1	0	0	0	0	0	0	0
FH	(Wales) Lewis Williams	0	0	0	0	0	0	0	0	0	0	0	0	0+1	0	0	0	0	0	0+1	0	0	0	0	0	0	0
FH	(Wales) Ioan Hughes	0+2	0	0	0	0	0	0	0	0	0	0	0	0+1	0	0	0	0	0	0+3	0	0	0	0	0	0	0
SH	(Wales) Gareth Davies	13	4	0	0	0	20	7+1	4	0	0	0	20	0	0	0	0	0	0	20+1	8	0	0	0	40	0	0
SH	(Wales) Jonathan Evans	6+10	2	0	0	0	10	0+1	0	0	0	0	0	1	0	0	0	0	0	7+11	2	0	0	0	10	0	0
SH	(Wales) Aled Davies	4+5	3	0	0	0	15	1+6	0	0	0	0	0	0	0	0	0	0	0	5+11	3	0	0	0	15	0	0
SH	(Wales) Declan Smith	0+5	0	0	0	0	0	0	0	0	0	0	0	1	0	0	0	0	0	1+5	0	0	0	0	0	0	0
SH	(Wales) Gareth George	0	0	0	0	0	0	0	0	0	0	0	0	0+3	0	0	0	0	0	0+3	0	0	0	0	0	0	0
SH	(Wales) Lee Rees	0	0	0	0	0	0	0	0	0	0	0	0	2	1	0	0	0	5	2	1	0	0	0	5	0	0
SH	(Wales) Mike Phillips	1+1	0	0	0	0	0	0	0	0	0	0	0	0	0	0	0	0	0	1+1	0	0	0	0	0	0	0
SH	(South Africa) Herschel Jantjies	0+1	0	0	0	0	0	0	0	0	0	0	0	0	0	0	0	0	0	0+1	0	0	0	0	0	0	0
SH	(Wales) Alex Schwarz	0	0	0	0	0	0	0	0	0	0	0	0	0+1	0	0	0	0	0	0+1	0	0	0	0	0	0	0
N8	(Scotland) John Barclay	10+2	0	0	0	0	0	5	0	0	0	0	0	0	0	0	0	0	0	15+2	0	0	0	0	0	1	0
N8	(Wales) Jack Condy	0+1	0	0	0	0	0	0	0	0	0	0	0	3	0	0	0	0	0	3+1	0	0	0	0	0	0	0
N8	(Wales) Tom Phillips	0	0	0	0	0	0	0	0	0	0	0	0	1	0	0	0	0	0	1	0	0	0	0	0	0	0
N8/FL	(Wales) Josh Macleod	7+10	1	0	0	0	5	1+5	0	0	0	0	0	0	0	0	0	0	0	8+15	1	0	0	0	5	0	0
FL/N8	(Wales) Will Boyde	15+8	1	0	0	0	5	2+4	0	0	0	0	0	0	0	0	0	0	0	17+12	1	0	0	0	5	1	0
FL	(Wales) James Davies	14	3	0	0	0	15	6	0	0	0	0	0	0	0	0	0	0	0	20	3	0	0	0	15	1	0
FL	(Wales) Aaron Shingler	13+1	2	0	0	0	10	6	0	0	0	0	0	0	0	0	0	0	0	19+1	2	0	0	0	10	0	0
FL	(Wales) Shaun Evans	0+1	0	0	0	0	0	0	0	0	0	0	0	1	0	0	0	0	0	1+1	0	0	0	0	0	0	0
FL	(Wales) Dan Davis	0	0	0	0	0	0	0	0	0	0	0	0	2+1	0	0	0	0	0	2+1	0	0	0	0	0	0	0
FL	(Wales) Stuart Worrall	0	0	0	0	0	0	0	0	0	0	0	0	3	0	0	0	0	0	3	0	0	0	0	0	0	0
FL	(Wales) Joseff Powell	0	0	0	0	0	0	0	0	0	0	0	0	0+1	0	0	0	0	0	0+1	0	0	0	0	0	1	0
FL	(Wales) Lloyd Pike	0	0	0	0	0	0	0	0	0	0	0	0	0+2	0	0	0	0	0	0+2	0	0	0	0	0	0	0
FL	(Wales) Lewis Ellis-Jones	0	0	0	0	0	0	0	0	0	0	0	0	1+1	0	0	0	0	0	1+1	0	0	0	0	0	0	0
FL/LK	(Wales) Jack Jones	0	0	0	0	0	0	0	0	0	0	0	0	2	0	0	0	0	0	2	0	0	0	0	0	0	0
LK/N8/FL	(Ireland) Tadhg Beirne	21+1	7	0	0	0	35	8	3	0	0	0	15	0	0	0	0	0	0	29+1	10	0	0	0	50	2	0
LK/FL	(Wales) Lewis Rawlins	10+9	0	0	0	0	0	2+4	0	0	0	0	0	0	0	0	0	0	0	12+13	0	0	0	0	0	0	0
LK	(Wales) Jake Ball	6	1	0	0	0	5	2	0	0	0	0	0	0	0	0	0	0	0	8	1	0	0	0	5	0	0
LK	(South Africa) David Bulbring	13+8	0	0	0	0	0	6+2	0	0	0	0	0	0	0	0	0	0	0	19+9	0	0	0	0	0	0	0
LK	(England) Tom Price	0+3	0	0	0	0	0	0	0	0	0	0	0	1	0	0	0	0	0	1+3	0	0	0	0	0	0	0
LK	(Wales) Josh Helps	0+1	0	0	0	0	0	0+1	0	0	0	0	0	3	0	0	0	0	0	3+2	0	0	0	0	0	0	0
LK	(Wales) Christian Long	0	0	0	0	0	0	0	0	0	0	0	0	2+1	0	0	0	0	0	2+1	0	0	0	0	0	1	0
LK	(Australia) Steve Cummins	11+3	0	0	0	0	0	2+1	0	0	0	0	0	0	0	0	0	0	0	13+4	0	0	0	0	0	0	0
LK	(Wales) Bryce Morgan	0	0	0	0	0	0	0	0	0	0	0	0	1+1	1	0	0	0	5	1+1	1	0	0	0	5	1	0
LK	(Wales) Jake Baker	0	0	0	0	0	0	0	0	0	0	0	0	0+1	0	0	0	0	0	0+1	0	0	0	0	0	0	0
HK	(Wales) Ryan Elias	14+7	1	0	0	0	5	1+4	0	0	0	0	0	0	0	0	0	0	0	15+11	1	0	0	0	5	0	0
HK	(Wales) Emyr Phillips	1+5	1	0	0	0	5	0	0	0	0	0	0	1	0	0	0	0	0	2+5	1	0	0	0	5	0	0
HK	(Wales) Ken Owens	10+4	0	0	0	0	0	7+1	0	0	0	0	0	0	0	0	0	0	0	17+5	0	0	0	0	0	0	0
HK	(Wales) Taylor Davies	0+5	0	0	0	0	0	0+1	0	0	0	0	0	0	0	0	0	0	0	0+6	0	0	0	0	0	0	0
HK	(Wales) Dafydd Hughes	0	0	0	0	0	0	0	0	0	0	0	0	2	0	0	0	0	0	2	0	0	0	0	0	0	0
HK	(Wales) Torin Myhill	0	0	0	0	0	0	0	0	0	0	0	0	1+1	0	0	0	0	0	1+1	0	0	0	0	0	0	0
HK/PR	(Wales) Craig Thomas	0	0	0	0	0	0	0	0	0	0	0	0	0+2	0	0	0	0	0	0+2	0	0	0	0	0	0	0
HK	(Wales) Steffan Phillips	0	0	0	0	0	0	0	0	0	0	0	0	0+1	0	0	0	0	0	0+1	0	0	0	0	0	0	0
PR	(Wales) Samson Lee	1	0	0	0	5	6	0	0	0	0	0	0	0	0	0	0	0	18	1	0	0	0	5	0	0	
PR	(Wales) Rob Evans	12+1	0	0	0	0	0	5+1	0	0	0	0	0	0	0	0	0	0	0	17+2	0	0	0	0	0	0	0
PR	(Australia) Dylan Evans	8+5	0	0	0	0	0	0+4	0	0	0	0	0	0	0	0	0	0	0	8+9	0	0	0	0	0	0	0
PR	(South Africa) Werner Kruger	12+11	3	0	0	0	15	2+6	0	0	0	0	0	0	0	0	0	0	0	14+17	3	0	0	0	15	0	0
PR	(Wales) Wyn Jones	3+8	0	0	0	0	0	3+3	0	0	0	0	0	0	0	0	0	0	0	6+11	0	0	0	0	0	0	0
PR	(Wales) Simon Gardiner	0+13	0	0	0	0	0	0+1	0	0	0	0	0	2	0	0	0	0	0	2+14	0	0	0	0	0	0	0
PR	(Wales) Rhys Fawcett	0+4	0	0	0	0	0	0	0	0	0	0	0	2	0	0	0	0	0	2+4	0	0	0	0	0	0	0
PR	(Wales) Javan Sebastian	0	0	0	0	0	0	0	0	0	0	0	0	2+2	0	0	0	0	0	2+2	0	0	0	0	0	2	0
PR	(Wales) Steffan Thomas	0	0	0	0	0	0	0	0	0	0	0	0	1+2	0	0	0	0	0	1+2	0	0	0	0	0	1	0
PR	(Wales) Scott Jenkins	0	0	0	0	0	0	0	0	0	0	0	0	0+1	0	0	0	0	0	0+1	0	0	0	0	0	0	0
PR	(Wales) Phil Price	1+5	0	0	0	0	0	0	0	0	0	0	0	1+1	0	0	0	0	0	2+6	0	0	0	0	0	0	0
PR	(Wales) Berian Watkins	0	0	0	0	0	0	0	0	0	0	0	0	0+1	0	0	0	0	0	0+1	0	0	0	0	0	0	0

Stats accurate as of match played 26 May 2018

== Transfers ==
=== In ===
Date confirmed	Pos.	Name	From	Ref.
26 June 2017	CE	(Australia) Paul Asquith	(Australia) Greater Sydney Rams	
27 June 2017	FB	(Wales) Rhys Jones	(Wales) Dragons	
27 June 2017	WG	(Wales) Tom Prydie	(Wales) Dragons	
27 June 2017	WG	(Wales) Tom Grabham	(Wales) Ospreys	
27 June 2017	FB	(Wales) Morgan Williams	(Wales) Ospreys	
3 August 2017	FB	(Wales) Leigh Halfpenny	(France) Toulon	
17 November 2017	LK	(Australia) Steve Cummins	(Australia) Melbourne Rebels	
21 November 2017	SH	(Wales) Mike Phillips	Unattached	
30 November 2017	SH	(South Africa) Herschel Jantjies	(South Africa) Western Province (loan)	
24 January 2018	PR	(Wales) Phil Price	(Wales) Dragons (loan)	
6 March 2018	WG	(England) Tom Varndell	(England) Bristol	

=== Out ===
Date confirmed	Pos.	Name	To	Ref.
9 January 2017	FB	(Wales) Liam Williams	(England) Saracens	
22 February 2017	WG	(Canada) D. T. H. van der Merwe	(England) Newcastle Falcons	
21 April 2017	PR	(England) / (Wales) Peter Edwards	(Wales) Merthyr RFC	
6 May 2017	FH	(Wales) Aled Thomas	Retired	
9 May 2017	CE	(Wales) Matthew Owen	Released	
9 May 2017	LK	(South Africa) Rynier Bernardo	(South Africa) Free State Cheetahs	
20 June 2017	CE	(Wales) Gareth Owen	(England) Leicester Tigers	
27 June 2017	N8	(Wales) Morgan Allen	(Wales) Bedwas	
27 June 2017	CE	(Wales) Richard Smith	(Wales) Neath	
6 September 2017	PR	(Wales) Nicky Thomas	(England) Bristol (loan)	
13 December 2017	PR	(Wales) Nicky Thomas	(Wales) Dragons (loan)	
