= 2015–16 Scarlets season =

Scarlets
- 2015–16 season
- Head coach: (New Zealand) Wayne Pivac
- Chief executive: (Wales) Darran Phillips
- Chairman: (Wales) Nigel Short
- Pro12: 5th
- European Champions Cup: Pool stage, 4th
- Top try scorer: League: D. T. H. van der Merwe (7); All: D. T. H. van der Merwe (8)
- Top points scorer: League: Aled Thomas (114); All: Aled Thomas (132)
- Highest home attendance: 14,562 v Ospreys (26 December 2015)
- Lowest home attendance: 5,504 v Zebre (29 November 2015)
- Average home attendance: 7,290

The 2015–16 season was the 13th season in the history of the Scarlets, a Welsh rugby union regional side based in Llanelli, Carmarthenshire. In this season, they competed in the Pro 12 and the European Champions Cup. It was head coach Wayne Pivac's second season in charge of the region, and Stephen Jones' first season as backs coach after joining from Wasps. In addition to this, Ioan Cunningham was promoted to forwards coach after being part of Llanelli RFC and the Scarlets academy coaching team.

== Pre-season and friendlies ==
Despite being a home game, the friendly against Bedford was played at Llandovery RFC's Church Bank instead of at Parc y Scarlets.

Date	Opponents	H / A	Result F–A	Scorers	Attendance
15 August 2015	Jersey	A	40–27	Tries: Price 27' c, J. Davies 33' m, A. Davies 38' c, Boyde 44' c, R. Williams 58' c, Nicholas 68' c Conversions: Thomas (2) 29', 39', D. Jones (3) 45', 59', 69'	1,477
21 August 2015	Newport Gwent Dragons	A	29–20	Tries: Owen 40' m, T. Williams 58' c, 74' c, D. Jones 72' c Conversions: S. Shingler 59', D. Jones (2) 73', 74'; Penalty: S. Shingler 61'	4,154
29 August 2015	Bedford Blues	H	13–27	Try: T. Williams 36' c Conversion: S. Shingler 37'; Penalties: S. Shingler (2) 4', 27'	713

== Pro 12 ==
=== Fixtures ===
Date	Opponents	H / A	Result F–A	Scorers	Attendance	Table position
5 September 2015	Glasgow Warriors	A	16–10	Tries: A. Shingler 5' m, Parkes 21' m Penalties: D. Jones (2) 29', 55'	6,562	4th
12 September 2015	Ulster	H	22–12	Try: Parkes 45' c Conversion: D. Jones 46'; Penalties: D. Jones (4) 2', 18', 24', 62'; Thomas 80'	6,061	1st
4 October 2015	Zebre	A	20–8	Try: J. Davies 43' m Penalties: D. Jones (3) 26', 33', 47', S. Shingler (2) 64', 67'	2,000	1st
16 October 2015	Leinster	H	25–14	Tries: J. Davies 8' m, Van der Merwe (2) 32' c, 52' c Conversions: S. Shingler (2) 34', 53'; Penalties: S. Shingler (2) 3', 61'	7,013	1st
23 October 2015	Munster	H	25–22	Tries: Van der Merwe 41' m, T. Williams 53' m Penalties: S. Shingler (5) 27', 40+1', 60', 77', 80+2'	6,466	1st
30 October 2015	Newport Gwent Dragons	H	25–15	Tries: J. Davies (2) 9' c, 65' m, John (2) 18' m, 58' m Conversion: Thomas 10'; Penalties: Thomas 48'	6,952	1st
6 November 2015	Leinster	A	15–19	Tries: Parkes 3' c, Owen 24' m Conversion: D. Jones 4'; Penalty: D. Jones 33'	14,743	2nd
29 November 2015	Zebre	H	20–12	Tries: Parkes 8' c, A. Davies 12' c Conversions Thomas (2) 9', 13'; Penalty: Thomas 22'	5,504	2nd
5 December 2015	Treviso	A	22–20	Tries: Allen (2) 12' c, 52' c, Van der Merwe 27' m Conversions: Thomas 13', 53'; Penalty: S. Shingler 77'	4,500	1st
26 December 2015	Ospreys	H	26–27	Tries: Barclay 11' c, A. Davies 35' c Conversions: Thomas (2) 12', 36'; Penalties: Thomas (4) 18', 24', 43', 52'	14,568	1st
1 January 2016	Cardiff Blues	A	27–29	Tries: Owens 6' c, Van der Merwe 11' c, G. Davies 65' c Conversions: Thomas (3) 7', 12', 67'; Penalties: Thomas (2) 17', 27'	11,720	1st
10 January 2016	Connacht	H	21–19	Tries: S. Evans 46' c, Collins 62' m Conversion: Thomas 47'; Penalties: Thomas (2) 37', 44', S. Shingler 80'	5,888	1st
30 January 2016	Connacht	A	17–30	Tries: Van der Merwe 44' c, Owen 73' c Conversions: Thomas (2) 45', 74'; Penalty: Thomas 43'	5,292	1st
12 February 2016	Edinburgh	H	22–21	Try: Allen 6' c Conversion: S. Shingler 7'; Penalties: S. Shingler 18', Thomas (4) 25', 47', 54', 77'	5,569	4th
21 February 2016	Ulster	A	21–20	Tries: Collins (2) 4' m, 23' c Conversions: Thomas 24'; Penalties: Thomas (3) 14', 46', 49'	15,201	3rd
28 February 2016	Edinburgh	A	23–24	Tries: Parkes 15' m, J. Davies 26' m, S. Evans 35' c Conversion: Thomas 36'; Penalties: Thomas (2) 7', 14'	3,618	3rd
4 March 2016	Treviso	H	24–15	Tries: S. Evans (2) 14' c, 72' c, J. Davies 20' c Conversions: Thomas (2) 15', 20', D. Jones 73'; Penalty: D. Jones 68'	5,237	3rd
26 March 2016	Ospreys	A	25–16	Try: Van der Merwe 30' c Conversion: D. Jones 31'; Penalties: D. Jones (2) 7', 37', Thomas (4) 64', 68', 76', 80+1'	12,051	3rd
2 April 2016	Cardiff Blues	H	22–28	Try: Barclay 70' c Conversion: Thomas 71'; Penalties: D. Jones (4) 14', 17', 29' 47', Thomas 55'	9,546	3rd
16 April 2016	Glasgow Warriors	H	10–46	Try: L. Williams 30' c Conversion: S. Shingler 31'; Penalty: S. Shingler 2'	8,165	5th
30 April 2016	Newport Gwent Dragons	N	34–20	Tries: S. Williams 8' c, S. Shingler 13' c, S. Evans 45' c, G. Davies 75' c Conversions: S. Shingler (4) 10', 13', 46', 76'; Penalties: S. Shingler (2) 24', 29'	68,262	5th
7 May 2016	Munster	A	15–31	Penalties: S. Shingler (5) 9', 21', 28', 37', 64'		5th

=== Table ===
Pos	Club	Pld	W	D	L	F	A	PD	BP	Pts
4	(Ireland) Ulster	22	14	0	8	488	307	+181	13	69
5	(Wales) Scarlets	22	14	0	8	477	458	+19	7	63
6	(Ireland) Munster	22	13	0	9	459	417	+42	11	63

== European Champions Cup ==
=== Fixtures ===
Date	Opponents	H / A	Result F–A	Scorers	Attendance	Pool position
14 November 2015	Northampton Saints	A	11–15	Try: G. Davies 51' m Penalties: S. Shingler (2) 15', 38'	14,512	2nd
21 November 2015	Racing 92	H	12–29	Tries: A. Thomas 57' m, Rawlins 66' c Conversion: A. Thomas 66'	8,512	3rd
12 December 2015	Glasgow Warriors	A	6–43	Penalties: S. Shingler (2) 11', 46'	6,576	4th
19 December 2015	Glasgow Warriors	H	6–9	Penalties: A. Thomas (2) 54', 67'	5,767	4th
17 January 2016	Racing 92	A	14–64	Tries: Van der Merwe 41' c, G. Davies 50' c Conversions: S. Shingler 42', 51'	6,931	4th
23 January 2016	Northampton Saints	H	10–22	Try: R. Jones 79' c Conversion: Thomas 80'; Penalty: Thomas 27'	6,823	4th

=== Table ===
Team	Pld	W	D	L	F	A	PD	BP	Pts
(France) Racing 92	6	4	1	1	174	70	+104	4	22
(England) Northampton Saints	6	4	1	1	94	93	1	1	19
(Scotland) Glasgow Warriors	6	3	0	3	114	18	+1	2	14
(Wales) Scarlets	6	0	0	6	59	182	−123	2	2

== Statistics ==
(+ in the Apps column denotes substitute appearance)

Pos.	Name	Pro 12						European Champions Cup						Total						Discipline	
Pos.	Name	Apps	Try	Con	Pen	Drop	Pts	Apps	Try	Con	Pen	Drop	Pts	Apps	Try	Con	Pen	Drop	Pts	Yellow card	Red card
FB/WG	(Wales) Steff Evans	14+1	5	0	0	0	25	3+1	0	0	0	0	0	17+2	5	0	0	0	25	1	0
FB/WG	(Wales) Liam Williams	4	1	0	0	0	5	0	0	0	0	0	0	4	1	0	0	0	5	0	0
FB	(Wales) Jordan Williams	1+1	0	0	0	0	0	0	0	0	0	0	0	1+1	0	0	0	0	0	0	0
WG/FB	(Wales) Tom Williams	4+3	1	0	0	0	5	1+1	0	0	0	0	0	5+4	1	0	0	0	5	1	0
WG	(Fiji) Michael Tagicakibau	4+1	0	0	0	0	0	3	0	0	0	0	0	7+1	0	0	0	0	0	0	0
WG	(Canada) D. T. H. van der Merwe	14	7	0	0	0	35	5	1	0	0	0	5	19	8	0	0	0	40	1	0
WG	(Wales) Harry Robinson	1+1	0	0	0	0	0	1	0	0	0	0	0	2+1	0	0	0	0	0	0	0
CE/WG	(New Zealand) Hadleigh Parkes	22	5	0	0	0	25	4	0	0	0	0	0	26	5	0	0	0	25	0	0
CE/FB	(Wales) Gareth Owen	15+3	2	0	0	0	10	4	0	0	0	0	0	19+4	2	0	0	0	10	0	0
CE	(New Zealand) Regan King	15+2	0	0	0	0	0	3+1	0	0	0	0	0	18+3	0	0	0	0	0	1	0
CE/FB	(New Zealand) Michael Collins	10+2	3	0	0	0	15	2+2	0	0	0	0	0	12+4	3	0	0	0	15	0	0
CE	(Wales) Steffan Hughes	1+2	0	0	0	0	0	0+2	0	0	0	0	0	1+4	0	0	0	0	0	0	0
CE	(Wales) Scott Williams	1	1	0	0	0	5	0	0	0	0	0	0	1	1	0	0	0	5	0	0
FH	(Wales) Daniel Jones	6+3	0	4	17	0	59	1+1	0	0	0	0	0	7+4	0	4	17	0	59	0	0
FH/FB	(Wales) Aled Thomas	13+9	0	18	26	0	114	3+1	1	2	3	0	18	16+10	1	20	29	0	132	1	0
FH	(Wales) Steven Shingler	7+6	1	8	21	0	84	4	0	2	4	0	16	11+8	1	10	25	0	100	0	0
FH	(Wales) Josh Lewis	0	0	0	0	0	0	0+1	0	0	0	0	0	0+1	0	0	0	0	0	0	0
SH	(Wales) Aled Davies	12+8	1	0	0	0	5	0+4	0	0	0	0	0	12+12	1	0	0	0	5	0	0
SH	(Wales) Rhodri Williams	5+8	0	0	0	0	0	0+2	0	0	0	0	0	5+10	0	0	0	0	0	0	0
SH	(Wales) Gareth Davies	5+3	2	0	0	0	10	6	2	0	0	0	10	11+3	4	0	0	0	20	0	0
SH	(Wales) Connor Lloyd	0+1	0	0	0	0	0	0	0	0	0	0	0	0+1	0	0	0	0	0	0	0
N8	(Wales) Rory Pitman	0+5	0	0	0	0	0	1	0	0	0	0	0	1+5	0	0	0	0	0	0	0
N8	(Wales) Jack Condy	0+8	0	0	0	0	0	1+1	0	0	0	0	0	1+9	0	0	0	0	0	0	0
N8	(Wales) Morgan Allen	10+3	3	0	0	0	15	4	0	0	0	0	0	14+3	3	0	0	0	15	0	0
FL/N8	(Scotland) John Barclay	17	1	0	0	0	5	2	0	0	0	0	0	19	1	0	0	0	5	2	0
FL	(Wales) James Davies	15	5	0	0	0	25	2	0	0	0	0	0	17	4	0	0	0	25	1	0
FL	(Wales) Aaron Shingler	15	1	0	0	0	5	4	0	0	0	0	0	19	1	0	0	0	5	0	0
FL	(Wales) Tom Phillips	0+2	0	0	0	0	0	1+1	0	0	0	0	0	1+3	0	0	0	0	0	0	0
FL	(Wales) Will Boyde	3+2	0	0	0	0	0	1	0	0	0	0	0	4+2	0	0	0	0	0	0	0
LK/FL	(Wales) Lewis Rawlins	12	0	0	0	0	0	2+3	1	0	0	0	5	14+3	1	0	0	0	5	1	0
LK	(England) Tom Price	8+4	0	0	0	0	0	3+2	0	0	0	0	0	11+6	0	0	0	0	0	1	0
LK	(South Africa) George Earle	5+7	0	0	0	0	0	1+1	0	0	0	0	0	6+8	0	0	0	0	0	2	0
LK	(Wales) Jake Ball	11	0	0	0	0	0	3	0	0	0	0	0	14	0	0	0	0	0	2	0
LK	(Samoa) Maselino Paulino	4+6	0	0	0	0	0	5+1	0	0	0	0	0	9+7	0	0	0	0	0	3	0
LK	(Wales) Jack Jones	0+1	0	0	0	0	0	0	0	0	0	0	0	0+1	0	0	0	0	0	0	0
LK	(South Africa) David Bulbring	9	0	0	0	0	0	0	0	0	0	0	0	9	0	0	0	0	0	0	0
HK	(Wales) Emyr Phillips	7+2	0	0	0	0	0	3+1	0	0	0	0	0	10+3	0	0	0	0	0	1	0
HK	(Wales) Kirby Myhill	5+7	0	0	0	0	0	0+2	0	0	0	0	0	5+9	0	0	0	0	0	0	0
HK	(Wales) Ryan Elias	1+6	0	0	0	0	0	0	0	0	0	0	0	1+6	0	0	0	0	0	0	0
HK	(Wales) Ken Owens	10+1	1	0	0	0	5	3	0	0	0	0	0	13+1	1	0	0	0	5	0	0
PR	(Wales) Peter Edwards	12+4	0	0	0	0	0	2	0	0	0	0	0	14+4	0	0	0	0	0	2	0
PR	(Wales) Phil John	8+6	2	0	0	0	10	4+1	0	0	0	0	0	12+7	2	0	0	0	10	1	0
PR	(Wales) Rob Evans	13+2	0	0	0	0	0	2	0	0	0	0	0	15+2	0	0	0	0	0	1	0
PR	(Wales) Will Taylor	0+5	0	0	0	0	0	0	0	0	0	0	0	0+5	0	0	0	0	0	0	0
PR	(Wales) Samson Lee	9+1	0	0	0	0	0	3+2	0	0	0	0	0	12+3	0	0	0	0	0	0	0
PR	(Australia) Dylan Evans	1+10	0	0	0	0	0	0+3	0	0	0	0	0	1+13	0	0	0	0	0	0	0
PR	(Wales) Rhodri Jones	1+9	0	0	0	0	0	1+3	1	0	0	0	5	2+10	1	0	0	0	5	0	0
PR	(Wales) Wyn Jones	0	0	0	0	0	0	0+2	0	0	0	0	0	0+2	0	0	0	0	0	0	0

Stats accurate as of match played 7 May 2016

== Transfers ==
=== In ===
Date confirmed	Pos.	Name	From
19 February 2015	WG	(Canada) D. T. H. van der Merwe	(Scotland) Glasgow Warriors
9 March 2015	FH	(Wales) Aled Thomas	(England) Gloucester
25 March 2015	PR	(Wales) Will Taylor	(England) Wasps
31 March 2015	LK	(England) / (Wales) Tom Price	(England) Leicester Tigers
20 April 2015	PR	(Australia) / (Wales) Dylan Evans	(Australia) Wanderers/Melbourne Rebels
29 April 2015	N8	(Wales) Jack Condy	(Wales) Cross Keys
4 May 2015	N8	(Wales) Morgan Allen	(Wales) Ospreys
20 July 2015	FB/WG	(Wales) Tom Williams	(Wales) Cardiff Blues (loan)
11 October 2015	LK	(Samoa) Maselino Paulino	(New Zealand) Waikato
26 October 2015	CE/FB	(New Zealand) Michael Collins	(New Zealand) Otago
3 February 2016	LK	(South Africa) David Bulbring	(South Africa) Eastern Province Kings

=== Out ===
Date confirmed	Pos.	Name	To
6 January 2015	FH	(Wales) Rhys Priestland	(England) Bath
19 April 2015	HK	(Wales) Darran Harris	(England) Rotherham
9 May 2015	LK	(South Africa) Johan Snyman	(France) Brive
9 May 2015	WG	(Wales) Kristian Phillips	(Wales) Ospreys
9 May 2015	WG	(New Zealand) Frazier Climo	(Scotland) Ayr RFC
9 May 2015	WG	(Wales) Kyle Evans	(England) Moseley
9 May 2015	PR	(South Africa) Jacobie Adriaanse	(France) Montpellier
9 May 2015	FL	(Wales) Sion Bennett	(England) Northampton Saints
12 May 2015	PR	(Wales) Javan Sebastian	(Scotland) Glasgow Warriors
18 May 2015	CE	(Wales) Adam Warren	(Wales) Newport Gwent Dragons
14 July 2015	FL	(Wales) Craig Price	(Wales) Neath RFC
2 September 2015	LK	(Wales) Richard Kelly	Retired
23 September 2015	FL/N8	(Wales) Rob McCusker	(England) London Irish
29 March 2016	N8	(Wales) Rory Pitman	Released
