= List of 2018–19 Pro14 transfers =

This is a list of player transfers involving Pro14 rugby union teams between the end of the 2017–18 season and the end of the 2018–19 season.

== Benetton ==
=== Players in ===
- (Italy) Marco Zanon from (Italy) Mogliano
- (Fiji) Iliesa Ratuva Tavuyara from (New Zealand) Waikato
- (Italy) Derrick Appiah from (England) London Scottish
- (Italy) Giuseppe Di Stefano from (Italy) Fiamme Oro
- (Italy) Giovanni Pettinelli from (Italy) Calvisano
- (Italy) Antonio Rizzi from (Italy) Petrarca
- (South Africa) Dewaldt Duvenage from (South Africa) Stormers
- (New Zealand) Toa Halafihi from (New Zealand) Taranaki

=== Players out ===
- (Italy) Filippo Filippetto retired
- (New Zealand) Marty Banks to (Japan) NTT Docomo Red Hurricanes
- (New Zealand) Whetu Douglas to (New Zealand) Crusaders
- (Italy) Matteo Zanusso to (Italy) Calvisano
- (Italy) Francesco Minto to (Italy) I Medicei
- (Fiji) Michael Tagicakibau to (New Zealand) Manawatu

== Cardiff Blues ==
=== Players in ===
- (Moldova) Dmitri Arhip from (Wales) Ospreys
- (Wales) Jason Harries from (Scotland) Edinburgh
- (Wales) Rory Thornton from (Wales) Ospreys (season-long loan)
- (United States) Samu Manoa from (France) Toulon
- (Wales) Liam Belcher from (Wales) Dragons
- (Wales) Tom Williams from (Wales) Scarlets

=== Players out ===
- (Wales) Alex Cuthbert to (England) Exeter Chiefs
- (England) Damien Welch to (Wales) Cross Keys
- (Tonga) Taufaʻao Filise retired
- (Wales) Sam Warburton retired
- (Wales) Gethin Jenkins retired
- (United States) Samu Manoa released
- (Wales) Steven Shingler to (France) Stade Montois

== Cheetahs ==
=== Players in ===
- (South Africa) Dian Badenhorst from (South Africa) Free State Cheetahs
- (South Africa) Aidon Davis from (France) Bayonne
- (South Africa) Louis Fouché from (Japan) Kubota Spears
- (South Africa) Benhard Janse van Rensburg from (South Africa) Southern Kings
- (South Africa) Rudy Paige from (South Africa) Bulls
- (South Africa) Sibabalo Qoma from (South Africa) Free State Cheetahs
- (South Africa) Tian Schoeman from (France) Bordeaux
- (South Africa) Dries Swanepoel from (South Africa) Bulls
- (South Africa) Jannes Snyman from (South Africa) UJ
- (South Africa) Marnus van der Merwe from (South Africa) Free State Cheetahs
- (South Africa) Boan Venter from (South Africa) Free State XV
- (South Africa) Quintin Vorster from (South Africa) Free State XV
- (South Africa) Louis Conradie from (South Africa) Free State XV
- (South Africa) JP du Preez from (South Africa) Free State XV
- (South Africa) Walt Steenkamp from (South Africa) Leopards
- (South Africa) Stephan Malan from (South Africa) Free State XV
- (South Africa) Luigy van Jaarsveld from (South Africa) Blue Bulls XV
- (United States) Ruben de Haas from (South Africa) Free State XV
- (South Africa) Niell Stannard from (South Africa) UFS Shimlas
- (South Africa) Carel-Jan Coetzee from (South Africa) Free State Cheetahs
- (South Africa) Vuyani Maqina from (South Africa) Free State Cheetahs
- (South Africa) Adriaan Carelse from (South Africa) Boland Cavaliers
- (South Africa) Abongile Nonkontwana from (South Africa) Blue Bulls
- (Zimbabwe) Tapiwa Mafura from (South Africa) Leopards
- (South Africa) Sintu Manjezi from (South Africa) Griquas
- (South Africa) Rhyno Smith from (South Africa) Sharks
- (South Africa) Darren Adonis from (South Africa) Free State Cheetahs

=== Players out ===
- (South Africa) Francois Venter to (England) Worcester Warriors
- (South Africa) Johan Goosen to (France) Montpellier
- (South Africa) Uzair Cassiem to (Wales) Scarlets
- (South Africa) Clayton Blommetjies to (Wales) Scarlets
- (South Africa) Tom Botha to (Wales) Ospreys
- (South Africa) Reniel Hugo to (Japan) Toyota Verblitz
- (South Africa) Niel Marais to (Japan) Yamaha Júbilo
- (South Africa) Clinton Swart to (Japan) Toyota Verblitz
- (South Africa) Henco Venter to (Japan) Toshiba Brave Lupus
- (South Africa) Carl Wegner to (Japan) Toyota Verblitz
- (South Africa) Tertius Kruger to (South Africa) Southern Kings
- (Namibia) Torsten van Jaarsveld to (France) Bayonne
- (South Africa) Rynier Bernardo to (Japan) Canon Eagles
- (South Africa) Paul Schoeman to (South Africa) Blue Bulls
- (South Africa) Fred Zeilinga to (Japan) Canon Eagles
- (South Africa) AJ Coertzen to (France) Aurillac
- (South Africa) Ruan van Rensburg to (South Africa) Southern Kings
- (South Africa) Luther Obi injured
- (South Africa) Jannes Snyman released
- (South Africa) Lihleli Xoli not named
- (South Africa) Louis Conradie released
- (South Africa) Niell Jordaan released
- (South Africa) Stephan Malan released
- (South Africa) Zee Mkhabela released

== Connacht ==
=== Players in ===
- (Ireland) Peter Claffey promoted from Academy
- (Ireland) Cillian Gallagher promoted from Academy
- (Ireland) Conán O'Donnell promoted from Academy
- (Ireland) Robin Copeland from (Ireland) Munster
- (Australia) Kyle Godwin from (Australia) Brumbies
- (Australia) David Horwitz from (Australia) Melbourne Rebels
- (England) Joe Maksymiw from (England) Leicester Tigers
- (Ireland) Jonny Murphy from (England) Rotherham Titans
- (Australia) Colby Fainga'a from (Australia) Melbourne Rebels
- (Ireland) Tom Daly from (Ireland) Leinster (loan)
- (Ireland) Angus Lloyd from (Ireland) Clontarf
- (Ireland) Stephen Fitzgerald from (Ireland) Munster (loan)

=== Players out ===
- (New Zealand) Jake Heenan to (England) Bristol Bears
- (Ireland) John Muldoon retired
- (New Zealand) Pita Ahki to (France) Toulouse
- (Australia) Andrew Deegan to (Australia) Western Force
- (Fiji) Naulia Dawai to (New Zealand) Otago
- (New Zealand) Stacey Ili to (New Zealand) Hawke's Bay
- (Ireland) JP Cooney retired
- (Ireland) Pat O'Toole to (United States) San Diego Legion
- (Ireland) Andrew Browne retired
- (Ireland) Denis Coulson to (Ireland) Lansdowne
- (Ireland) Steve Crosbie to (Ireland) Old Belvedere
- (Ireland) Rory Scholes to (France) Brive
- (Ireland) Cormac Brennan released

== Dragons ==
=== Players in ===
- (Wales) Jordan Williams from (England) Bristol Bears
- (Wales) Rhodri Williams from (England) Bristol Bears
- (Wales) Ross Moriarty from (England) Gloucester
- (Wales) Rhodri Davies from (England) Rotherham Titans
- (Wales) Richard Hibbard from (England) Gloucester
- (England) Huw Taylor from (England) Worcester Warriors
- (Wales) Josh Lewis from (England) Bath
- (Wales) Ryan Bevington from (England) Bristol Bears
- (Wales) Aaron Jarvis from (France) Clermont
- (Wales) Dafydd Howells from (Wales) Ospreys
- (South Africa) Tiaan Loots from (Wales) RGC 1404
- (New Zealand) Jacob Botica from (Wales) RGC 1404
- (Wales) Rhys Lawrence from (England) Ealing Trailfinders
- (Samoa) Brandon Nansen from (France) Stade Français Paris
- (Wales) Carwyn Penny from (England) Gloucester
- (Wales) Jason Tovey from (Scotland) Edinburgh

=== Players out ===
- (South Africa) Sarel Pretorius to (South Africa) Southern Kings
- (Wales) Phil Price to (Wales) Scarlets
- (Wales) Scott Andrews to (Wales) Neath
- (Wales) Luke Garrett to (Wales) Neath
- (Wales) Adam Hughes retired
- (South Africa) Pat Howard to (England) Ealing Trailfinders
- (Wales) Rhys Buckley to (Wales) Bargoed
- (Wales) Barney Nightingale to (Wales) Bargoed
- (Wales) Keagan Bale to (Wales) Bargoed
- (Wales) Angus O'Brien to (Wales) Scarlets
- (Wales) Nicky Thomas to (Wales) Scarlets (return from short-term loan)
- (Wales) Dorian Jones to (France) Angoulême
- (England) Charlie Davies to (England) Northampton Saints
- (Wales) Lloyd Lewis to (Wales) Pontypool
- (New Zealand) Sam Beard to (New Zealand) Canterbury
- (Wales) Thomas Davies to (Wales) Cardiff
- (Wales) Ashley Sweet to (Wales) Ebbw Vale
- (Wales) Liam Belcher to (Wales) Cardiff Blues
- (Wales) Robson Blake retired
- (South Africa) Carl Meyer to (Wales) Ebbw Vale
- (Wales) Sam Hobbs to (Wales) Merthyr
- (Wales) James Thomas released

== Edinburgh ==
=== Players in ===
- (Scotland) John Barclay from (Wales) Scarlets
- (New Zealand) Simon Hickey from (France) Bordeaux
- (Scotland) Matt Scott from (England) Gloucester
- (Argentina) Juan Pablo Socino from (England) Newcastle Falcons
- (Scotland) Dave Cherry from (France) Stade Niçois
- (Italy) Pietro Ceccarelli from (France) Oyonnax
- (South Africa) Pierre Schoeman from (South Africa) Bulls
- (Fiji) Senitiki Nayalo from (England) London Irish
- (Scotland) Luke Hamilton from (England) Leicester Tigers
- (Scotland) Henry Pyrgos from (Scotland) Glasgow Warriors
- (South Africa) Jason Baggott promoted from Academy
- (Scotland) Charlie Shiel promoted from Academy
- (Scotland) George Taylor promoted from Academy

=== Players out ===
- (Scotland) George Turner to (Scotland) Glasgow Warriors
- (Samoa) Jordan Lay to (England) Bristol Bears
- (Scotland) Cornell du Preez to (England) Worcester Warriors
- (Australia) Junior Rasolea to (France) Grenoble
- (Scotland) Neil Cochrane retired
- (Scotland) Duncan Weir to (England) Worcester Warriors
- (Scotland) Elliot Millar-Mills to (England) Ealing Trailfinders
- (Scotland) Sam Hidalgo-Clyne to (Wales) Scarlets
- (Wales) Jason Harries to (Wales) Cardiff Blues
- (Scotland) Kevin Bryce (Scotland) Glasgow Warriors
- (England) Matt Shields retired
- (Scotland) Phil Burleigh to (New Zealand) Canterbury
- (New Zealand) Robbie Fruean retired
- (England) Callum McLelland to (England) Leeds Rhinos
- (Scotland) Alasdair Dickinson retired
- (Scotland) Glenn Bryce to (Scotland) Watsonians
- (Wales) Jason Tovey to (Wales) Dragons
- (Scotland) John Hardie to (England) Newcastle Falcons
- (Scotland) Tom Galbraith to (England) Northumbria University

== Glasgow Warriors ==
=== Players in ===
- (Scotland) George Turner from (Scotland) Edinburgh
- (Canada) D. T. H. van der Merwe from (England) Newcastle Falcons
- (United States) David Tameilau from (France) Narbonne
- (Australia) Nick Frisby from (Australia) Queensland Reds
- (Scotland) Robbie Nairn promoted from Academy
- (Scotland) Bruce Flockhart promoted from Academy
- (Scotland) Adam Nicol promoted from Academy
- (Scotland) Kevin Bryce from (Scotland) Edinburgh
- (Scotland) Thomas Gordon from (Scotland) Currie
- (Scotland) Andrew Davidson from (England) Newcastle Falcons (short-term deal)
- (South Africa) Petrus du Plessis from (England) London Irish

=== Players out ===
- (Scotland) Finn Russell to (France) Racing 92
- (Scotland) Ryan Grant retired
- (Scotland) Pat MacArthur retired
- (Scotland) Richie Vernon to (England) London Scottish
- (Scotland) Lewis Wynne to (England) London Scottish (season-long loan)
- (Scotland) Henry Pyrgos to (Scotland) Edinburgh
- (Samoa) Brian Alainu'uese to (France) Toulon
- (United States) Greg Peterson to (France) Bordeaux
- (Italy) Leonardo Sarto to (England) Leicester Tigers
- (Scotland) Alex Dunbar to (England) Newcastle Falcons

== Leinster ==
=== Players in ===
- (Ireland) Jordan Larmour promoted from Academy
- (Ireland) Vakh Abdaladze promoted from Academy
- (Ireland) Caelan Doris promoted from Academy
- (Ireland) Josh Murphy promoted from Academy
- (Australia) Joe Tomane from (France) Montpellier
- (Ireland) Will Connors promoted from Academy

=== Players out ===
- (Ireland) Jordi Murphy to (Ireland) Ulster
- (Ireland) Jamie Heaslip retired
- (Fiji) Isa Nacewa retired
- (Ireland) Richardt Strauss retired
- (Ireland) Oisin Heffernan to (England) Nottingham
- (Ireland) Peadar Timmins retired
- (Ireland) Joey Carbery to (Ireland) Munster
- (Ireland) Cathal Marsh to (United States) Rugby United New York

== Munster ==
=== Players in ===
- (Ireland) Tadhg Beirne from (Wales) Scarlets
- (Ireland) Calvin Nash promoted from Academy
- (Ireland) Liam O'Connor promoted from Academy
- (Ireland) Fineen Wycherley promoted from Academy
- (England) Mike Haley from (England) Sale Sharks
- (Ireland) Neil Cronin from (Ireland) Garryowen
- (South Africa) Arno Botha from (England) London Irish
- (Ireland) Joey Carbery from (Ireland) Leinster
- (New Zealand) Alby Mathewson from (France) Toulon (short-term deal)
- (Ireland) Cronan Gleeson from (Ireland) Old Wesley (short-term deal)

=== Players out ===
- (Ireland) Simon Zebo to (France) Racing 92
- (Ireland) Robin Copeland to (Ireland) Connacht
- (Ireland) David Johnston to (England) Ealing Trailfinders
- (South Africa) Gerbrandt Grobler to (England) Gloucester
- (Ireland) Stephen Fitzgerald to (Ireland) Connacht (three-month loan)
- (Ireland) Ian Keatley to (England) London Irish (short-term deal)
- (Ireland) Mike Sherry to (England) Gloucester (loan)
- (Ireland) Ronan O'Mahony retired

== Ospreys ==
=== Players in ===
- (Wales) Scott Williams from (Wales) Scarlets
- (Wales) Aled Davies from (Wales) Scarlets
- (Namibia) Lesley Klim from (England) Doncaster Knights
- (South Africa) Tom Botha from (South Africa) Cheetahs
- (Wales) George North from (England) Northampton Saints
- (Moldova) Gheorghe Gajion from (France) Trelissac
- (Argentina) Guido Volpi from (France) Narbonne
- (Georgia (country)) Giorgi Nemsadze from (England) Bristol Bears
- Luke Morgan from Wales Sevens
- (South Africa) Johnny Kôtze from (South Africa) Bulls (short-term deal)

=== Players out ===
- (South Africa) Brian Mujati retired
- (Wales) Dan Biggar to (England) Northampton Saints
- (Wales) Rhys Webb to (France) Toulon
- (Samoa) Kieron Fonotia to (Wales) Scarlets
- (Wales) Ashley Beck to (England) Worcester Warriors
- (Wales) Ben John sabbatical
- (Wales) Eli Walker retired
- (Wales) Rowan Jenkins to (England) Yorkshire Carnegie
- (Wales) Dafydd Howells to (Wales) Dragons
- (Wales) Hugh Gustafson retired
- (Moldova) Dmitri Arhip to (Wales) Cardiff Blues
- (Wales) Rory Thornton to (Wales) Cardiff Blues (season-long loan)
- (Canada) Jeff Hassler retired
- (New Zealand) Brendon Leonard to (New Zealand) Taranaki
- (Wales) Jay Baker to (Wales) Merthyr
- (Wales) Paul James retired

== Scarlets ==
=== Players in ===
- (Samoa) Kieron Fonotia from (Wales) Ospreys
- (New Zealand) Blade Thomson from (New Zealand) Hurricanes
- (South Africa) Uzair Cassiem from (South Africa) Cheetahs
- (South Africa) Clayton Blommetjies from (South Africa) Cheetahs
- (Wales) Phil Price from (Wales) Dragons
- (Scotland) Sam Hidalgo-Clyne from (Scotland) Edinburgh
- (Wales) Kieran Hardy from (England) Jersey Reds
- (Wales) Angus O'Brien from (Wales) Dragons
- (Australia) Ed Kennedy from (Australia) Randwick
- (Wales) Matthew Davies from (Wales) Neath
- (Wales) Marc Jones from (England) Sale Sharks

=== Players out ===
- (Ireland) Tadhg Beirne to (Ireland) Munster
- (Scotland) John Barclay to (Scotland) Edinburgh
- (Wales) Scott Williams to (Wales) Ospreys
- (Wales) Aled Davies to (Wales) Ospreys
- (Wales) Billy McBryde to (Wales) RGC 1404
- (Wales) Jack Condy retired
- (Wales) Tom Grabham retired
- (Wales) Emyr Phillips retired
- (England) Tom Varndell to (France) Angoulême
- (Wales) Geraint Rhys Jones to (Wales) Ebbw Vale
- (Wales) Nicky Thomas to (Wales) Bargoed
- (Wales) Tom Williams to (Wales) Cardiff Blues

== Southern Kings ==
=== Players in ===
- (South Africa) Sarel Pretorius from (Wales) Dragons
- (Fiji) Meli Rokoua from (Portugal) AEIS Agronomia
- (South Africa) JC Astle from (France) Mont-de-Marsan
- (South Africa) Schalk Oelofse from (France) Mont-de-Marsan
- (South Africa) Tertius Kruger from (South Africa) Cheetahs
- (South Africa) Ulrich Beyers from (South Africa) Blue Bulls XV
- (South Africa) Bjorn Basson from (France) Oyonnax
- (South Africa) Lupumlo Mguca from (South Africa) Eastern Province Elephants
- (South Africa) Brandon Brown from (South Africa) Eastern Province Elephants
- (South Africa) Stephan de Wit from (South Africa) Western Province
- (South Africa) Ruan van Rensburg from (South Africa) Cheetahs
- (South Africa) Michael Botha from (South Africa) Eastern Province Elephants
- (South Africa) Xandré Vos from (South Africa) Eastern Province Elephants
- (South Africa) Tristan Blewett from (South Africa) Sharks (short-term deal)
- (South Africa) Stefan Ungerer from (South Africa) Pumas
- (South Africa) NJ Oosthuizen from (South Africa) Griquas (short-term deal)
- (South Africa) Alulutho Tshakweni from (South Africa) Blue Bulls U21
- (South Africa) Kerron van Vuuren from (South Africa) Sharks (short-term deal)
- (South Africa) Bader Pretorius from (South Africa) Golden Lions U21
- (South Africa) De-Jay Terblanche from (South Africa) Pumas (short-term deal)
- (South Africa) Courtney Winnaar from (South Africa) Sharks

=== Players out ===
- (South Africa) Piet-Louw Strauss to (South Africa) Maties
- (South Africa) Rowan Gouws to (South Africa) Eastern Province Elephants
- (South Africa) JP Smith to (South Africa) Eastern Province Elephants
- (South Africa) Joe Smith to (South Africa) Leopards
- (South Africa) Njabulo Gumede to (South Africa) Free State XV
- (South Africa) Anthony Volmink to (South Africa) Golden Lions XV
- (South Africa) Jacques Nel to (France) Aurillac
- (South Africa) Alshaun Bock to (South Africa) SWD Eagles
- (South Africa) Kurt Coleman injured
- (South Africa) Dayan van der Westhuizen to (South Africa) Blue Bulls XV
- (South Africa) Entienne Swanepoel to (Italy) Valsugana
- (South Africa) Eital Bredenkamp to (South Africa) Griquas
- (South Africa) JC Roos retired
- (South Africa) Siya Mdaka to (South Africa) Leopards
- (South Africa) Freddy Ngoza to (South Africa) Boland Cavaliers
- (South Africa) Victor Sekekete to (South Africa) Blue Bulls
- (South Africa) Lusanda Badiyana to (South Africa) Eastern Province Elephants
- (South Africa) Tristan Blewett to (United States) New Orleans Gold
- (South Africa) Stephan Coetzee to (United States) Seattle Seawolves
- (South Africa) Kerron van Vuuren to (South Africa) Sharks (short-term deal ended)
- (South Africa) Lindokuhle Welemu not named
- (South Africa) Khaya Majola not named
- (South Africa) Luzuko Vulindlu not named
- (South Africa) Godlen Masimla to (South Africa) Western Province
- (South Africa) NJ Oosthuizen to (South Africa) Griquas (short-term deal ended)
- (South Africa) De-Jay Terblanche to (South Africa) Pumas (short-term deal ended)

== Ulster ==
=== Players in ===
- (Ireland) Marty Moore from (England) Wasps
- (Ireland) Jordi Murphy from (Ireland) Leinster
- (Ireland) Nick Timoney promoted from Academy
- (England) Will Addison from (England) Sale Sharks
- (Ireland) Alexander Thompson from (Ireland) Terenure
- (England) Billy Burns from (England) Gloucester
- (Ireland) Greg Jones promoted from Academy
- (Ireland) Adam McBurney promoted from Academy
- (Ireland) Johnny Stewart promoted from Academy
- (Ireland) Alan Bennie from (Ireland) Lansdowne
- (Australia) Henry Speight from (Australia) Brumbies (short-term deal)
- (Ireland) Angus Curtis promoted from Academy
- (Ireland) Tom O'Toole promoted from Academy
- (Ireland) Ian Nagle from (Ireland) Leinster (loan deal)

=== Players out ===
- (New Zealand) Charles Piutau to (England) Bristol Bears
- (Ireland) Tommy Bowe retired
- (Ireland) Callum Black to (England) Worcester Warriors
- (England) Brett Herron to (England) Jersey Reds
- (Ireland) Paul Marshall retired
- (Ireland) Callum Patterson to (England) Cornish Pirates
- (Ireland) Andrew Trimble retired
- (Ireland) Stuart Olding to (France) Brive
- (Ireland) Jared Payne retired
- (Ireland) Paddy Jackson to (France) Perpignan
- (Ireland) Aaron Cairns to (Ireland) Ballynahinch
- (England) Peter Browne retired
- (South Africa) Jean Deysel retired
- (Ireland) Chris Henry retired
- (Ireland) Rodney Ah You to (England) Newcastle Falcons
- (Ireland) Robbie Diack released
- (South Africa) Schalk van der Merwe released
- (South Africa) Wiehahn Herbst to (South Africa) Bulls

== Zebre ==
=== Players in ===
- (Italy) Edoardo Padovani from (France) Toulon
- (Argentina) Nicolas De Battista from (England) Cornish Pirates
- (Italy) Massimo Ceciliani from (Italy) Viadana
- (Italy) Samuele Ortis from (Italy) Rovigo Delta
- (Italy) Giovanni Licata from (Italy) Fiamme Oro
- (Italy) Giosuè Zilocchi from (Italy) Calvisano
- (Italy) Daniele Rimpelli from (Italy) Calvisano
- (Italy) Jimmy Tuivaiti from (Italy) Calvisano
- (Fiji) Paula Balekana from (Australia) Sydney Rays
- (Fiji) Apisai Tauyavuca from (Fiji) Fijian Drua
- (Tonga) Matu Tevi from (New Zealand) North Harbour
- (South Africa) Francois Brummer from (South Africa) Bulls
- (England) Jamie Elliot from (England) Bedford Blues
- (Fiji) James Brown from (Australia) Northern Suburbs
- (New Zealand) Josh Renton from (New Zealand) Otago
- (Argentina) Marco Ciccioli from (Argentina) CASI

=== Players out ===
- (New Zealand) James Tucker to (New Zealand) Waikato
- (Samoa) Failaga Afamasaga to (Italy) Colorno
- (Italy) Andrea Manici retired
- (Italy) Andrea De Marchi to (Italy) I Medicei
- (Italy) Valerio Bernabò retired
- (Italy) Jacopo Sarto to (Italy) Colorno
- (Ireland) Rory Parata to (England) Cornish Pirates
- (Italy) Matteo Pratichetti retired
- (Argentina) Serafin Bordoli to (Argentina) Olivos
- (Ireland) Ciaran Gaffney retired
- (South Africa) Derick Minnie retired
- (Italy) Tommaso D'Apice retired
- (Italy) Sami Panico released

== See also ==
- List of 2018–19 Premiership Rugby transfers
- List of 2018–19 RFU Championship transfers
- List of 2018–19 Super Rugby transfers
- List of 2018–19 Top 14 transfers
- List of 2018-19 Major League Rugby transfers
