= Rhys Patchell =

Wales international rugby union player & Welsh language broadcaster

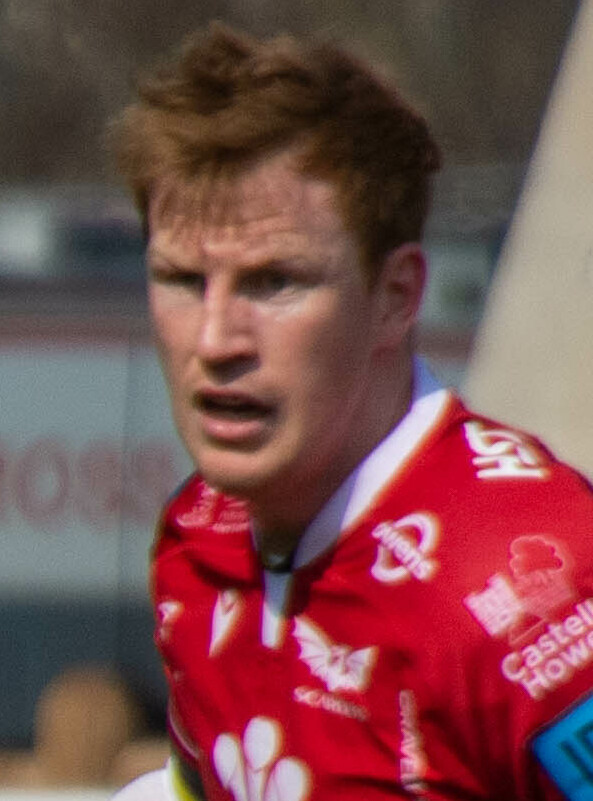
- Born: Rhys Patchell; 17 May 1993 (age 33) Llandough, Penarth, Wales
- Height: 1.91 m (6 ft 3 in)
- Weight: 92 kg (14 st 7 lb)
- School: Ysgol Gyfun Gymraeg Glantaf

Rugby union career
- Position(s): Fly-half; Fullback
Amateur team(s)
Years	Team	Apps	(Points)
2011–2012	Cardiff, [CRICC]	16	(114)
Senior career
Years	Team	Apps	(Points)
2011–2016	Cardiff Blues	83	(614)
2016–2023	Scarlets	86	(409)
2023–2024	Highlanders	6	(10)
2024–2025	Green Rockets Tokatsu	12	(127)
- Correct as of 10 July 2023
International career
Years	Team	Apps	(Points)
2013	Wales U20	1	(0)
2013–2023	Wales	22	(82)
- Correct as of 3 March 2023

Rhys Patchell (born 17 May 1993) is a retired Welsh international rugby union player. A fly-half, he played for the Highlanders in Super Rugby, having previously played for the Scarlets and Cardiff Blues. Patchell played for Wales 22 times between 2013 and 2023.

== Early life ==
Educated at Ysgol Gymraeg Melin Gruffydd and at Ysgol Gyfun Gymraeg Glantaf. Patchell speaks Welsh, and is an ambassador for the Tafwyl festival.

== Club career ==
Patchell graduated from the Blues Academy into the full regional side at an early age in 2012. He went on to score more than 600 points in a five-year stint at the Arms Park that saw him make 83 appearances. He scored 174 points in the 2015/16 season to top the Guinness Pro12 charts.

Patchell joined Scarlets in 2016 and ended his first season as the leading points scorer in the Guinness Pro12 once again with 145. Patchell picked up a winners' medal, helping the west Walians beat Munster in the 2017 Pro12 Grand Final at the Aviva Stadium.

Patchell suffered a series of injuries between 2019 and 2021, limiting his involvement with both the Scarlets and Wales. He returned to full fitness in early 2022, featuring frequently for the Scarlets during the latter half of their season, and continuing his involvement into the 2022–23 United Rugby Championship.

On 21 April 2023, it was announced that Patchell would leave the Scarlets at the end of the season.

Patchell signed for Super Rugby club the Highlanders on 12 July 2023.

== International career ==
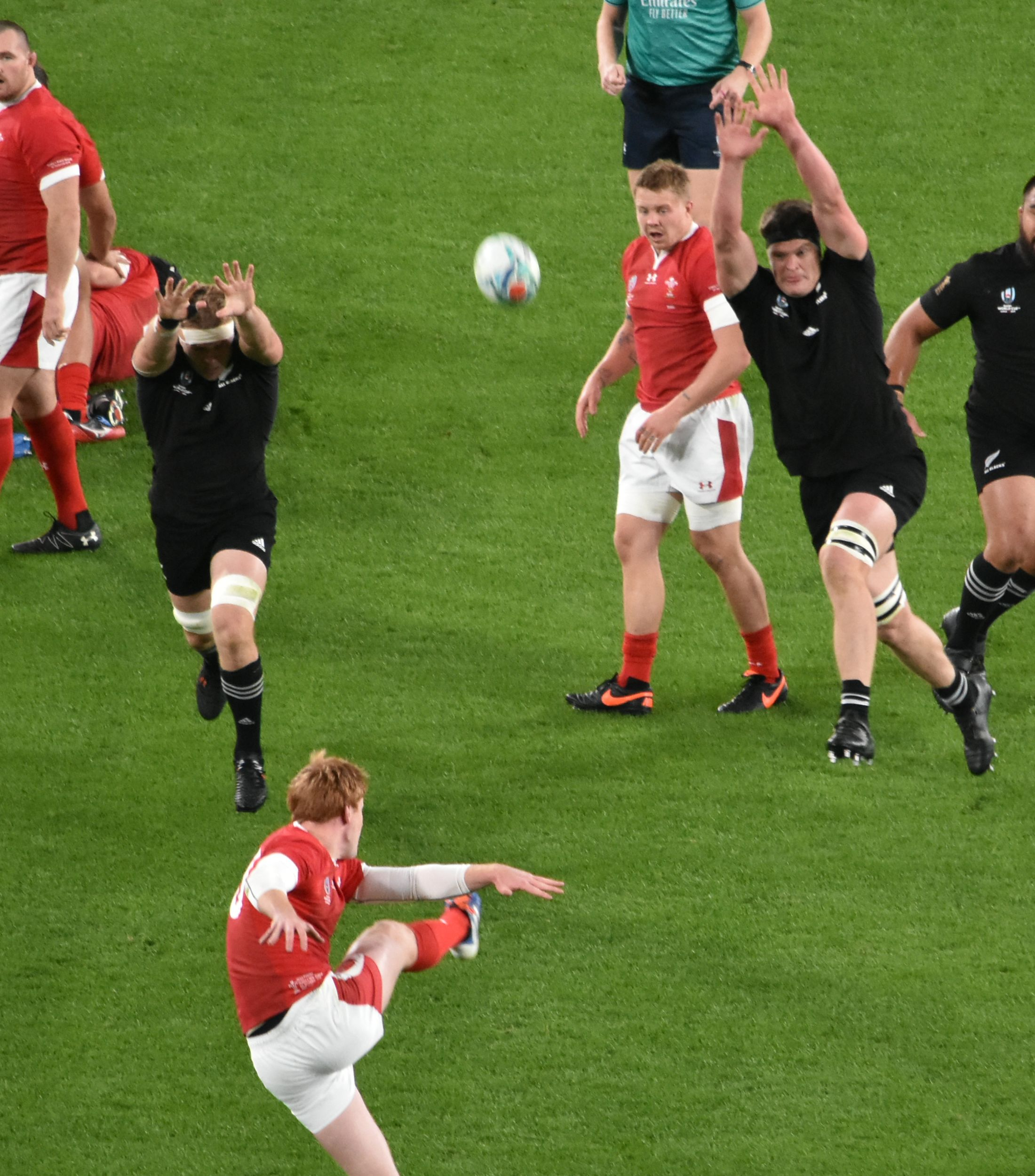
Patchell kicking the ball in the 2019 Rugby World Cup match against New Zealand

In January 2013, Patchell was selected in the Wales U20 squad for the 2013 U20 Six Nations Championship.

In May 2013, he was selected for the Wales national rugby union team for the summer 2013 tour to Japan. He made his international debut against Japan on 8 June 2013, and played again in the reverse fixture the following week. Patchell had to wait three years before he won his next cap, and made his first start, after being called out to New Zealand as a replacement for the 2016 summer tour. He came on as a replacement in the midweek game against the Chiefs and started at full-back in the last two Tests with the All Blacks.

Patchell moved into his favoured No 10 shirt for the first two games of the 2018 Six Nations campaign, a home win over Scotland on his tournament debut and an away defeat to England, before dropping to the bench for the win over Italy. He was back at No 10 for the two wins over Argentina on the 2018 summer tour, scoring 30 points in the two games, and then notched his first international try in the home win over Tonga in November, 2018.

Patchell was selected in the Welsh squad for the 2019 Rugby World Cup. He replaced Dan Biggar early in the pool stage match against Australia, kicking a conversion, three penalties, and a drop goal as Wales won 29–25.

Patchell played in the rearranged Six Nations fixture against Scotland in October 2020.

=== International tries ===
Try	Opponent	Location	Venue	Competition	Date	Result
1	Tonga	Cardiff, Wales	Millennium Stadium	2018 Autumn Internationals	17 November 2018	Win
2	Ireland	Cardiff, Wales	Millennium Stadium	2019 Rugby World Cup warm-up matches	31 August 2019	Loss

== Coaching career ==
Patchell was named as an assistant coach for Wales in the 2025 end-of-year rugby union internationals. He is also the kicking coach for the Dragons.
