= Luke Garrett =

Welsh rugby union player

- Born: Luke Garrett; 11 January 1995 (age 31) Abergavenny, Wales
- Height: 180 cm (5 ft 11 in)
- Weight: 121 kg (19 st 1 lb)
- School: Coleg Gwent

Rugby union career
- Position: Loosehead Prop
Senior career
Years	Team	Apps	(Points)
2012-	Cross Keys	67	(6)
- Correct as of 25 January 2018
Provincial / State sides
Years	Team	Apps	(Points)
2015-	Dragons	17	(0)
2016	→ Scarlets	8	(0)
- Correct as of 28 May 2018
International career
Years	Team	Apps	(Points)
2014-15	Wales U20	16	(0)
- Correct as of 8 January 2017

Luke Garrett (born 11 January 1995) is a Welsh rugby union player who plays as a prop forward for the Dragons. He formerly played for Cross Keys RFC.

Garrett made his debut for the Dragons in April 2015 against the Scarlets, who he later joined on loan for the first half of the 2016–17 season after Rob Evans was ruled out with an injury. He was released by the Dragons at the end of the 2017–18 season.
