= Rhys Jones (rugby union) =

Welsh rugby player (born 1987)

- Full name: Geraint Rhys Jones
- Born: 23 August 1987 (age 39) Abergavenny, Wales
- Height: 178 cm (5 ft 10 in)
- Weight: 90 kg (14 st 2 lb)
- School: Brynmawr Comprehensive
- Notable relative: Kingsley Jones

Rugby union career
- Position: Full-back/Fly-half
- Current team: Scarlets
Senior career
| Years | Team | Apps | (Points) |
| 2007–2008 | Sale Sharks | 7 | (22) |
| 2008–2010 | Cornish Pirates | 25 | (220) |
| 2010–2011 | Newport RFC | 13 | (101) |
| 2011–2012 | Llanelli RFC | 4 | (7) |
| 2011–2012 | Carmarthen Quins | 4 | (10) |
| 2013– | Cross Keys | 14 | (63) |
- Correct as of 10 March 2016
Provincial / State sides
| Years | Team | Apps | (Points) |
| 2011–2012 | Scarlets | 4 | (7) |
| 2013– | Newport Gwent Dragons | 24 | (102) |
- Correct as of 10 March 2016
International career
| Years | Team | Apps | (Points) |
- Wales U20
- Correct as of 6 December 2015

Geraint Rhys Jones is a Welsh rugby union player. A fly half, he is the son of former Wales international Kingsley Jones. He has played for Wales at under-18, under-19 and under-20 levels, as well as for the Wales Sevens team.

Jones played for Sale Sharks, Cardiff Blues and the Cornish Pirates before heading back to Wales to Newport RFC and Wales 7s. Whilst playing for the Cornish Pirates, Jones was selected for the Wales Sevens squad.

In May 2010, Jones joined Newport RFC. Jones was selected for the Wales Sevens team for the 2010 Commonwealth Games rugby sevens tournament.

In July 2011, Jones joined the Scarlets.

He was selected in the Wales Sevens squad for 2012–13.
