= Richard Smith (rugby union, born 1987) =

Welsh rugby player

- Born: Richard Smith; 8 November 1987 (age 39) Neath, Wales
- Height: 188 cm (6 ft 2 in)
- Weight: 101 kg (15 st 13 lb)
- University: Swansea University

Rugby union career
- Position: Winger/Centre
- Current team: Scarlets
Senior career
Years	Team	Apps	(Points)
2010–16	Cardiff RFC	80	(173)
2016–17	Llandovery RFC	11	(15)
- Correct as of 20 February 2017
Provincial / State sides
Years	Team	Apps	(Points)
2011–16	Cardiff Blues	44	(40)
2016–17	Scarlets	3	(0)
- Correct as of 10 May 2017
International career
Years	Team	Apps	(Points)
2010–13	Wales 7s		
- Correct as of 20 February 2017

For people of the same name see Richard Smith (disambiguation)

Richard Smith (born 8 November 1987) is a Welsh rugby union player. A centre/wing, he plays club rugby for the Scarlets.

The centre signed for the Cardiff Blues in 2013 after graduating from playing for Cardiff RFC. Smith previously played for Neath in 2009/10 before spending a season in Australia where he turned out for Brisbane Bulldogs.

Richard's pace gained him a spot on the sevens circuit during the summer of 2011 where he played for Wales in three of the four legs of the FIRA series, playing in Bucharest, Barcelona and Moscow. He then played in every tournament of the 2012 HSBC world sevens series, scoring a total of 26 TRIES.

Smith made his debut for the Cardiff Blues at centre where he paired up with Jamie Roberts, for the teams' victory over Munster at Musgrave Park.
