= Michael Collins (rugby union, born 1993) =

New Zealand rugby union player (born 1993)

- Full name: Michael William Vincent Collins
- Born: 3 June 1993 (age 33) Queenstown, New Zealand
- Height: 186 cm (6 ft 1 in)
- Weight: 99 kg (218 lb; 15 st 8 lb)
- School: Otago Boys' High School
- University: University of Otago

Rugby union career
- Position(s): Fullback, Wing, Centre, Fly-half
- Current team: Toshiba Brave Lupus
Senior career
Years	Team	Apps	(Points)
2012–2020	Otago	65	(75)
2015–2016	Scarlets	16	(15)
2017–2019	Blues	28	(20)
2019–2021	Highlanders	22	(40)
2021–2023	Ospreys	38	(25)
2023–	Toshiba Brave Lupus	42	(60)
- Correct as of 14 January 2024
International career
Years	Team	Apps	(Points)
2013	New Zealand U20	5	(10)
- Correct as of 27 September 2021

Michael William Vincent Collins (born 3 June 1993) is a professional rugby union player who plays as centre. He is a former captain of the Otago Boys' High School 1st XV and a former New Zealand Schools representative. He has turned down offers from the NRL franchise the Melbourne Storm and ITM Cup Premiership side Waikato to play for Otago. Collins most recently played for the Ospreys in the United Rugby Championship.

== Career ==
Collins made his Otago debut in 2012, and played for the NPC side until 2020.

In 2015, Collins joined Welsh club the Scarlets on a short-term contract, returning to New Zealand at the end of the season.

Upon his return to New Zealand, Collins joined Super Rugby team the Blues.

Otago-born Collins joined his home region, the Highlanders, for the 2020 Super Rugby season and was involved with the side for the next two seasons.

Collins returned to Wales in 2021, joining the Ospreys in the newly formed United Rugby Championship. He made his debut on 26 September 2021, scoring two tries in a Man of the Match performance against the Dragons.

On 23 June 2023, Collins announced his departure from the Ospreys.

On 18 July 2023, Collins joined Toshiba Brave Lupus, in Japan Rugby League One from 2023 to 2024 Season.

== Personal life ==
Collins is Welsh-qualified, through his Llanelli-born grandfather.
