= Kirby Myhill =

Welsh rugby union footballer

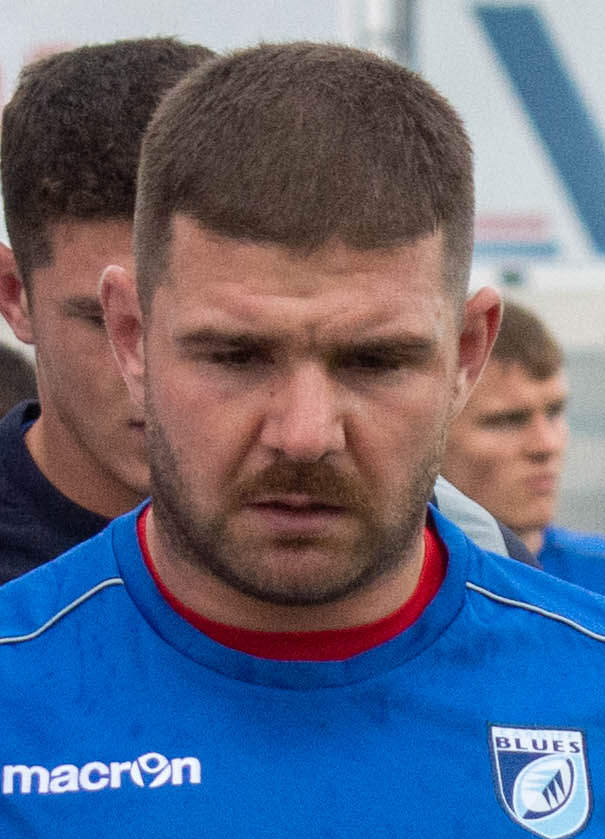
- Myhill at the European Challenge Cup for Calvisano vs Cardiff Blues in 2019
- Born: Kirby Myhill; 5 February 1992 (age 34) Burry Port, Wales
- Height: 183 cm (6 ft 0 in)
- Weight: 103 kg (16 st 3 lb; 227 lb)
- School: Glan-y-Mor, Coleg Sir Gâr
- Notable relative(s): Mark Perego (uncle), Torin Myhill (brother)

Rugby union career
- Position: Hooker
Youth career
- Burry Port RFC
Senior career
Years	Team	Apps	(Points)
2010–2016	Llanelli RFC	54	(21)
2010–2016	Scarlets	65	(15)
2016–2023	Cardiff Rugby	98	(20)
2023–2025	Miami Sharks	22	(25)
2025	Scarlets	4	(0)
- Correct as of 3 November 2025
International career
Years	Team	Apps	(Points)
2010–2012	Wales U20	16	(5)
2021	Wales	1	(0)
- Correct as of 6 November 2022

Kirby Myhill (born 5 February 1992) is a Welsh rugby union rugby player who plays as a hooker. Myhill begin his career with the Scarlets academy, and represented the team for six seasons before joining Cardiff Rugby, and later joined the Miami Sharks. He is also a Wales and Wales Under-20 international.

== Club career ==
Myhill attended Glan-y-Mor Comprehensive School and Coleg Sir Gâr, where he played for their rugby team, as well as with the Burry Port RFC youth side. Myhill was part of the Scarlets academy, and made a positional change from back row to hooker while playing at U18 level.

Myhill made his Scarlets debut in 2011, coming on as a substitute in a 26–15 defeat to Leinster. His first start came later that year, in a 35–12 loss to Munster. So far in his career, Myhill has had to settle for a back-up role in the Scarlets squad, being behind the likes of Matthew Rees, Ken Owens and Emyr Phillips in the pecking order. Although he signed a contract extension with the Scarlets in April 2015, it was confirmed in April 2016 that Myhill, in the search for more first-team rugby, would move to the Cardiff Blues for the 2016–17 season. Early in the season, he suffered a knee injury that ruled him out for a couple of weeks. He signed a new contract with the Blues in June 2018, another in May 2019, and another in September 2020.

Myhill was released at the end of the 2022–23 United Rugby Championship season.

Myhill later joined Major League Rugby expansion team Miami Sharks, joining fellow Welsh international Rob Evans.

After the Sharks withdrew from MLR, Myhill rejoined the Scarlets on a short-term loan, early in the 2025–26 United Rugby Championship. His loan was completed after the first block of fixtures.

== International career ==
Previously involved with Wales U16 and Wales U18, Myhill represented Wales U20 and was named captain of the side for the 2012 Six Nations Under 20s Championship.

Following injuries to other hookers in the squad, Myhill was surprisingly called up by Wales for their test against New Zealand in October 2021. He made his debut off the bench on 30 October 2021.

== Personal life ==
Myhill is the nephew of former Wales international rugby union flanker Mark Perego and brother of former Scarlets hooker Torin Myhill.
