= Torin Myhill =

Welsh rugby union player

- Born: Torin Myhill; 2 August 1995 (age 31) Burry Port, Carmarthenshire
- Height: 177 cm (5 ft 10 in)
- Weight: 102 kg (16 st 1 lb)
- School: Coleg Sir Gar
- Notable relative: Kirby Myhill (brother)

Rugby union career
- Position: Hooker
- Current team: Carmarthen Quins
Senior career
Years	Team	Apps	(Points)
2013-16	Llanelli RFC	47	(30)
2016-	Carmarthen Quins	122	(155)
- Correct as of 17 October 2023
Provincial / State sides
Years	Team	Apps	(Points)
2013-16	Scarlets	5	(0)
2022	Cardiff Rugby	1	(0)
- Correct as of 17 October 2023
International career
Years	Team	Apps	(Points)
2015	Wales U20	5	(0)
- Correct as of 19 February 2016

Torin Myhill (born 2 August 1995) is a Welsh rugby union player who plays for Carmarthen Quins as a hooker. He is a former Wales Under-20 international.

Myhill has previously played for Llanelli RFC and the Scarlets. His brother is Kirby Myhill, who previously played for the Scarlets and for Cardiff Rugby.

In January 2022, Myhill was called up to the Cardiff Rugby squad as injury cover for their European Rugby Champions Cup game against the Harlequins. He made his debut for Cardiff in the game, coming off the bench to replace Owen Lane.
