= Tom Grabham =

Welsh rugby union player

- Born: Tom Grabham; 20 June 1991 (age 35) Bridgend, Wales
- Height: 178 cm (5 ft 10 in)
- Weight: 86 kg (13 st 8 lb; 190 lb)

Rugby union career
- Position(s): Wing, Scrum-half
Senior career
Years	Team	Apps	(Points)
2009–2014	Aberavon	2	(5)
2011–2014	Bridgend	41	(45)
2011–2017	Ospreys	50	(40)
2017	Scarlets	1	(0)
- Correct as of 9 April 2023
National sevens team
Years	Team		Comps
2012–2013	Wales		

Tom Grabham (born 20 June 1991) is a Welsh former professional rugby union player who played as a wing or scrum-half. Prior to retirement, Grabham played for the Scarlets and the Ospreys.

== Professional career ==
Grabham began playing for Tondu RFC, and came through the Ospreys development system, also playing for Bridgend Ravens and Aberavon RFC. He made his Ospreys debut on 15 October 2011 in an Anglo-Welsh Cup match against Exeter Chiefs. While with the Ospreys, Grabham underwent a positional change, moving from scrum half to wing. Grabham signed a two-year extension with the Ospreys in 2013. He further extended his Ospreys contract in 2015 for another two seasons.

On 27 June 2017, it was announced that Grabham would join the Scarlets for the 2017–18 Pro14 season. Grabham made one appearance for the Scarlets, on 9 September 2017. During the match, Grabham suffered a serious knee injury, and announced his retirement on 13 April 2018.

Grabham is a Wales Sevens international, and captained the team for an event in 2012.
