= Declan Smith =

Welsh rugby player

- Born: Declan Smith; 14 September 1997 (age 29) Carmarthen, Wales
- Height: 175 cm (5 ft 9 in)
- Weight: 85 kg (13 st 5 lb)

Rugby union career
Senior career
Years	Team	Apps	(Points)
2016–2018	Llanelli RFC	12	(0)
2019	Tasman	2	(0)
- Correct as of 19 August 2020
Provincial / State sides
Years	Team	Apps	(Points)
2016–2017	Scarlets	17	(5)
- Correct as of 19 August 2020
International career
Years	Team	Apps	(Points)
2016–2017	Wales U20	9	(0)
- Correct as of 19 August 2020

Declan Smith (born 14 September 1997) is a Welsh rugby union player who plays as a scrum-half.

== Career ==
Smith made his debut for the Scarlets in 2016. Smith earned his first call-up to the Wales U20s squad for the U20 Six Nations, and he was also called up to the squad for the 2017 U20 Six Nations. In 2019 Smith played for New Zealand Mitre 10 Cup team Tasman playing 2 games for the Mako in the 2019 season which the side won for the first time unbeaten.
