= Tadhg Beirne =

Irish rugby union player (born 1992)

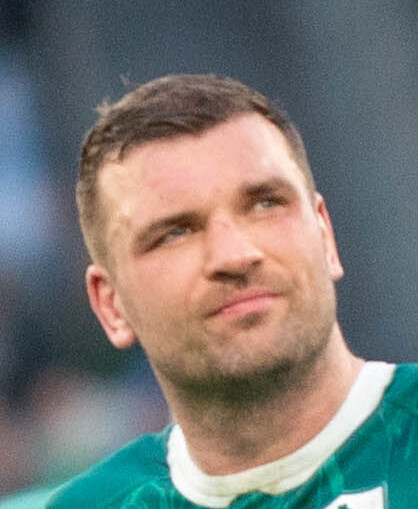
- Beirne in 2025
- Born: Tadhg Gerard Beirne; 8 January 1992 (age 34) Eadestown, Ireland
- Height: 1.96 m (6 ft 5 in)
- Weight: 117 kg (18.4 st; 258 lb)
- School: Clongowes Wood College
- University: Dublin City University
- Notable relative: Alannah Beirne (sister)

Rugby union career
- Position(s): Lock, Flanker
Amateur team(s)
Years	Team	Apps	(Points)
2012–2016	Lansdowne		
2016–2018	Llandovery		
Senior career
Years	Team	Apps	(Points)
2015–2016	Leinster	4	(0)
2016–2018	Scarlets	57	(60)
2018–	Munster	105	(70)
- Correct as of 24 October 2026
International career
Years	Team	Apps	(Points)
2012	Ireland U20	9	(0)
2018–	Ireland	76	(60)
2021, 2025	British & Irish Lions	5	(5)
- Correct as of 21 November 2026
National sevens team
Years	Team		Comps
2015	Ireland		2

Tadhg Gerard Beirne (/ˈtaɪɡ ˈbɜːrn/; born 8 January 1992) is an Irish rugby union player who plays as a lock for United Rugby Championship club Munster, where he is the club captain, and the Ireland national team.

== Club career ==
=== Leinster ===
Beirne graduated through the Leinster academy and made his senior debut from the bench against the Cardiff Blues on 12 September 2015. Beirne made a further three appearances for Leinster, playing twice against Dragons and once against Scarlets, a team he would later go on to play for. All of these appearances came off the bench. Beirne spent most of his career at Leinster playing for their A team and he earned 10 caps for them, making 9 appearances in the British and Irish Cup. Beirne was then released by Leinster.

=== Scarlets ===
It was announced on 28 June 2016 that Beirne had moved to Scarlets. Beirne made his Scarlets debut off the bench in the opening game of the season, a loss against Munster. He then played a massive role in Scarlets successful 2016–17 season, in which they beat Munster 46–22 in the 2017 Pro12 Grand Final to win their first silverware since the 2003–04 season.

In February 2025, Beirne revealed his original intention was to stay with the Scarlets beyond the 2017–18 season for at least an additional year after signalling this intention to the management. Staying with the club for this extended period would have also allowed him to play for the Wales national team under the residency ruling. However, after the member of staff responsible for contracts with the club was away on a skiing holiday during the negotiation stage, Munster used the delay to make their own offer to Beirne which he accepted.

=== Munster ===
In October 2017, Munster announced the signing of Beirne on a two-year contract, which began at the start of the 2018–19 season. Beirne was named the Guinness Players' Player of the Season when the 2017–18 Pro14 awards were announced in August 2018. He made his Munster debut on 7 September 2018, coming on as a replacement for Dave O'Callaghan in the province's 2018–19 Pro14 fixture against Glasgow Warriors. Beirne made his first start for Munster on 14 September 2018, doing so in their 49–13 win against Ospreys in Irish Independent Park.

Beirne scored his first try for Munster in the province's 30–22 defeat at the hands of Leinster on 6 October 2018. Beirne made his Champions Cup debut for Munster on 13 October 2018, earning the Man-of-the-Match in the province's opening 2018–19 pool 2 fixture against English side Exeter Chiefs, which ended in a 10–10 draw in Sandy Park. He was Man-of-the-Match in Munster's 26–17 win against Leinster on 29 December 2018 and in their 9–7 win against Exeter Chiefs in round 6 of the Champions Cup on 19 January 2019, a result the ensured Munster advanced to a record 18th Champions Cup quarter-final.

Beirne signed a two-year contract extension with Munster in May 2019. He was named in the 2018–19 Pro14 Dream Team when it was announced in May 2019, his second such accolade, having also been named in the 2017–18 Pro14 Dream Team whilst a Scarlets player. Beirne suffered a sustained a fractured ankle in Munster's 15–6 defeat away to English side Saracens in round 4 of the 2019–20 Champions Cup on 14 December 2019, and subsequently had to undergo surgery for the injury in January 2020. Beirne made his comeback from the injury in Munster's 2019–20 Pro14 round 15 fixture against Connacht on 30 August 2020, scoring a try and winning the Man-of-the-Match award in Munster's 49–12 victory.

When regular captain Peter O'Mahony was injured in the warm-up ahead of Munster's 2021–22 United Rugby Championship round 10 fixture at home to provincial rivals Ulster on 8 January 2022, Beirne, who had originally been named on the bench, was promoted to the starting XV in O'Mahony's place and also to the captaincy, leading Munster for the first time and earning the player of the match award in the 18–13 win. Beirne signed a new three-year central contract with Munster and the IRFU in February 2022, a deal that will see him remain with the province until at least July 2025.

Beirne earned his 50th cap for Munster in their 24–17 win against provincial rivals Connacht in round 8 of the 2022–23 United Rugby Championship on 26 November 2022. An ankle injury sustained whilst on international duty during the 2023 Six Nations required surgery, ruling Beirne out for 12 weeks. He returned from the injury to play the full eighty minutes in Munster's 14–5 away win against Glasgow Warriors in the quarter-finals of the 2022–23 United Rugby Championship on 6 May 2023, and started in Munster's 19–14 win against the Stormers in the final of the 2022–23 United Rugby Championship on 27 May 2023.

In September 2024, Beirne was named Munster club captain.

== Ireland ==
Beirne made nine appearances for the Ireland under-20s and was part of the team which finished 6th in the 2012 IRB Junior World Championship. Beirne also played for the Ireland sevens team in 2015.

Beirne received his first senior international call-up in May 2018, being selected in the Ireland squad to tour Australia in June, and made his senior Ireland debut on 16 June 2018, coming on as a replacement for Peter O'Mahony in the second test against Australia, before also coming off the bench for Ireland during their 20–16 third test victory, a win that sealed a 2–1 historic series victory for Ireland. Beirne made his first start for Ireland against Italy on 3 November 2018, doing so in their Autumn international in Soldier Field, Chicago, and scoring two tries in his sides 54–7 victory, whilst also starting in the 57–14 win against the United States three weeks later.

Beirne was selected in the 31-man Ireland squad for the 2019 Rugby World Cup, having featured in the warm-up matches against Italy, England and Wales. During the World Cup itself, Beirne featured off the bench in Ireland's opening 27–3 win against Scotland and their shock 19–12 defeat against hosts Japan, and started in the 35–0 win against Russia and 47–5 win against Samoa in their final pool game, before featuring off the bench again in the comprehensive 46–14 defeat against New Zealand in the quarter-finals, which brought an end to Ireland's 2019 World Cup.

During the delayed 2020 Six Nations Championship, Beirne started in the 50–17 win against Italy and the 35–27 defeat against France, then featured off the bench in the Autumn Nations Cup-opening 32–9 win against Wales and started in the 23–10 win against Georgia.

The 2021 Six Nations saw Beirne secure his place in Ireland's starting XV, as he started in the 21–16 defeat against Wales, the 15–13 defeat against France, the 48–10 away win against Italy, the 27–24 away win against Scotland and the 32–18 win against England in the final round. Beirne was named in the 2021 Six Nations Team of the Championship, having also been nominated for the Player of the Tournament. During the 2021 Autumn Nations Series, Beirne started in Ireland's 60–5 win against Japan on 6 November, before featuring off the bench in the famous 29–20 win against New Zealand on 13 November. After Iain Henderson was injured minutes before kick-off, Beirne was promoted from the bench to start against Argentina in Ireland's final fixture of the series on 21 November, scoring a try in their 53–7 home win.

Beirne started in Ireland's 29–7 win against Wales in their opening fixture of the 2022 Six Nations Championship on 5 February, their 30–24 defeat away to France on 12 February, their 57–6 home win against Italy on 27 February, their 32–15 away win against England on 12 March, and the 26–5 home win against Scotland on 19 March that secured the Triple Crown for Ireland. Despite having been out with a thigh injury since the Scotland fixture, Beirne was selected in the squad for the 2022 Ireland rugby union tour of New Zealand, and started in the 42–19 defeat against New Zealand in the first test on 2 July. Beirne also started in Ireland's historic 23–12 win in the second test on 9 July, in what was Ireland's first ever away win against New Zealand, and in the 32–22 third test win against New Zealand on 16 July that secured Ireland's historic first ever series win in New Zealand.

During the 2022 Autumn Nations Series, Beirne started for Ireland in their 19–16 win against world champions South Africa on 5 November, the 35–17 win against Fiji on 12 November, and the 13–10 win against Australia on 19 November. Beirne was named in World Rugby's Men's 15s Dream Team of the Year at their annual awards held in Monaco in November 2022.

Beirne continued to start for Ireland in their opening fixture of the 2023 Six Nations Championship against Wales on 4 February, being replaced by Ulster's Iain Henderson during the second-half of Ireland's 34–10 away win, before also starting in the 32–19 win against France in round two on 11 February, though Beirne left the field with an ankle injury during the second-half. That injury required surgery which ruled Beirne out for 12 weeks. Ireland went on win the grand slam.

Beirne returned to the Ireland training squad for the 2023 Rugby World Cup warm-up matches, featuring as a replacement in the 33–17 win against Italy on 5 August before starting in the 29–10 win against England on 19 August and the 17–13 win against Samoa on 26 August. He was selected in Ireland's 33-man squad for the 2023 Rugby World Cup, starting in their opening fixture of the tournament against Romania on 9 September, scoring two tries in Ireland's 82–8 win, the 59–16 win against Tonga on 16 September, in which Beirne scored a try, the 13–8 win against South Africa on 23 September, the 36–14 win against Scotland on 7 October, and the 28–24 defeat against New Zealand in the quarter-finals on 14 October.

In November 2024, he was named at lock in the 2024 World Rugby Dream Team of the Year.

In November 2025, he was initially shown a controversial yellow card in the opening fixture of the 2025 Autumn Nations Series against New Zealand fly half Beauden Barrett. During this match, this was upgraded to a 20-minute red card with Ireland going on to lose 26–13. However, after further review by the foul play officers, the red card was rescinded, with Barrett himself offering to support Beirne throughout the citing process, and he was free to play in the next game. Later that month, he was named at lock in the 2025 World Rugby Dream Team of the Year.

== British & Irish Lions ==
Beirne earned his first call up for the British & Irish Lions when the squad for the 2021 tour to South Africa was announced in May 2021. He made his non-test debut for the Lions and scored a try in their 28–10 warm-up victory against Japan on 26 June, before starting and scoring two tries in the Lions' 71–31 win against the Sharks on 10 July, featuring off the bench in the 17–13 defeat against South Africa 'A' on 14 July, and starting in the 49–3 win against the Stormers on 17 July. Beirne made his test debut for the Lions as a replacement in their 22–17 first test victory against South Africa on 24 July, and featured off the bench again in the second test on 31 July, which South Africa won 27–9 to take the series to a deciding third test. However, Beirne was not selected for the third and final test, which the Lions lost.

In May 2025, he was selected for the 2025 British & Irish Lions tour to Australia. Following a successful 2–1 test victory, in which he started all three tests in the back row, he was named Player of the Series.

== Personal life ==
Beirne's mother, Brenda Hyland Beirne, was crowned the 1983 Rose of Tralee.

Beirne married his longtime partner Harriet Fuller in August 2022.

== Statistics ==
=== International analysis by opposition ===
Against	Played	Won	Lost	Drawn	Tries	Points	% Won
Argentina	1	1	0	0	1	5	100
Australia*	5	5	0	0	1	5	100
England	5	3	2	0	0	0	60
Fiji	1	1	0	0	0	0	100
France	5	2	3	0	1	5	40
Georgia	1	1	0	0	0	0	100
Italy	6	6	0	0	2	10	100
Japan*	3	2	1	0	1	5	66.67
New Zealand	6	3	3	0	0	0	50
Romania	1	1	0	0	2	10	100
Russia	1	1	0	0	0	0	100
Samoa	2	2	0	0	0	0	100
Scotland	5	5	0	0	1	5	100
South Africa*	4	3	1	0	0	0	75
Tonga	1	1	0	0	1	5	100
United States	1	1	0	0	1	5	100
Wales	7	5	2	0	2	10	71.43
Total	55	43	12	0	13	65	78.18

Correct as of 26 July 2024 * indicates inclusion of caps for British & Irish Lions

== Honours ==
=== Scarlets ===
- United Rugby Championship:
  - Winner (1): 2016–17

=== Munster ===
- United Rugby Championship
  - Winner (1): 2022–23

=== Ireland ===
- Six Nations Championship:
  - Winner (2): 2023, 2024
- Grand Slam:
  - Winner (1): 2023
- Triple Crown:
  - Winner (4): 2022, 2023, 2025, 2026

=== Individual ===
- Pro14 Players' Player of the Season:
  - Winner (1): 2017–18
- World Rugby Men's 15s Dream Team of the Year:
  - Winner (3): 2022 2024, 2025
- British & Irish Lions Tour Tom Richards Medal (Player of the Series):
  - Winner (1): 2025 tour of Australia
- Spirit of Kildare Awards Winner of Sports Achievement Award 2026 hosted by Kildare County Council on St Brigids Day, February 1, 2026 as part of the Brigid Spirit of Kildare Festival.
