= Morgan Allen =

Welsh rugby player (born 1990)

Personal information
- Full name: Morgan Andrew Allen
- Born: 12 March 1990 (age 35); Newport, Wales
- Height: 185 cm (6 ft 1 in)
- Weight: 115 kg (18 st 2 lb)

Playing information

Rugby union
- Position: Number 8
Club
| Years | Team | Pld | T | G | FG | P |
|---|---|---|---|---|---|---|
| 2008–09 | Bedwas RFC | 1 | 0 | 0 | 0 | 0 |
| 2009–10 | Pontypool RFC | 19 | 2 | 0 | 0 | 10 |
| 2010–12 | Swansea RFC | 18 | 3 | 0 | 0 | 15 |
| 2011–13 | Aberavon RFC | 16 | 5 | 0 | 0 | 25 |
| 2016 | Llanelli RFC | 1 | 0 | 0 | 0 | 0 |
| 2016–17 | Carmarthen Quins | 9 | 2 | 0 | 0 | 10 |
| 2017–18 | Ealing Trailfinders | 15 | 4 | 0 | 0 | 20 |
| 2017 | Bedwas RFC | 4 | 2 | 0 | 0 | 10 |
| 2017-2022 | Cardiff RFC | 78 | 22 | 0 | 0 | 110 |
| 2020 | Bedwas RFC | 1 | 0 | 0 | 0 | 0 |
| 2024- | Pontypool RFC | 40 | 11 | 0 | 0 | 55 |
| | Total | 202 | 51 | 0 | 0 | 255 |
Representative
| Years | Team | Pld | T | G | FG | P |
| 2008 | Wales U18 | 5 | 1 | 0 | 0 | 5 |
| 2010 | Wales U20 | 10 | 3 | 0 | 0 | 15 |
| 2010–15 | Ospreys | 53 | 7 | 0 | 0 | 35 |
| 2015–17 | Scarlets | 26 | 4 | 0 | 0 | 20 |

Rugby league
Club
| Years | Team | Pld | T | G | FG | P |
|---|---|---|---|---|---|---|
| 2021 | West Wales Raiders | 6 | 0 | 0 | 0 | 0 |
- As of 20 January 2023

Morgan Andrew Allen (born 12 March 1990) is a rugby union and rugby league player for Pontypool RFC in the Super Rygbi Cymru. He has represented Wales at Under 18 and Under 20 level.

== Personal life ==
Allen was born on 12 March 1990, in Newport, Wales. His father Andy represented Wales on three occasions in 1990.

He attended Croesyceiliog Comprehensive School in Cwmbran, South Wales.

== Rugby Union ==
In December 2009, Allen was selected in the Wales Under 20 squad for the U-20 Six Nations in February–March 2010 starting every game. In May 2010, he was included in the Wales Under-20 squad once more, this time for the Junior World Championship in Argentina in June 2010, scoring 3 tries in two games against Fiji.

In May 2015, Allen signed for the Scarlets for the 2015–16 season.

After being released from the Scarlets at the end of the 2016–17 season, Allen signed for Ealing Trailfinders in October 2017 for the remainder of the season. He subsequently joined Cardiff RFC.

In September 2019, Allen was named captain of Cardiff RFC.

In 2024 it was confirmed that Allen would return to his home club Pontypool for a second stint.

== Rugby league ==
=== West Wales Raiders ===
On 28 February 2021, it was reported that he had signed for West Wales Raiders in the RFL League 1.
