= Billy McBryde =

Welsh rugby union footballer

- Born: Billy McBryde; 24 October 1996 (age 30) Carmarthen, Wales
- Height: 177 cm (5 ft 10 in)
- Weight: 93 kg (14 st 9 lb)
- School: Coleg Sir Gâr
- Notable relative: Robin McBryde (father)

Rugby union career
- Position: Fly-half
- Current team: RGC 1404
Senior career
Years	Team	Apps	(Points)
2015–2018	Llanelli	32	(176)
2016–2018	Scarlets	7	(14)
2018–2020	RGC 1404		
2020–2024	Doncaster Knights	75	(106)
2024–	RGC 1404		
2026	→ Scarlets (loan)	1	(0)
International career
Years	Team	Apps	(Points)
2016	Wales U20	7	(14)

Billy McBryde (born 24 October 1996) is a Welsh rugby union player. A fly-half, although he has previously played centre too, he plays for the RGC 1404. His father is former Wales international hooker Robin McBryde.

== Professional career ==
=== Club career ===
McBryde made his debut as an 18-year-old for Llanelli, as a substitute against Cross Keys. A year-and-a-half later, he made his Scarlets debut as a substitute in a 44–21 win over Bath in the Anglo-Welsh Cup. He was released at the end of the 2017–18 Pro14 season, and joined RGC 1404.

McBryde joined Doncaster Knights in June 2020, and extended his contract in May 2023. McBryde rejoined RGC 1404 in 2024.

McBryde rejoined the Scarlets on loan on 26 January 2026, as cover during the Six Nations.

=== International career ===
He was selected in the Wales U20 for the 2016 Six Nations Under 20s Championship. His debut came in the opening game against Scotland U20. McBryde came on in the 79th minute, and immediately scored a penalty to win the game for Wales. He was selected again for the 2016 World Rugby Under 20 Championship, and made a further three appearances for the U20s.
