= Hadleigh Parkes =

Wales international rugby union player (born 1987)

- Born: Hadleigh William Parkes; 5 October 1987 (age 39) Hunterville, New Zealand
- Height: 1.87 m (6 ft 1 1/2 in)
- Weight: 101 kg (223 lb)
- School: Palmerston North Boys' High School
- University: University of Canterbury; Lincoln University

Rugby union career
- Position(s): Centre; Wing; Fly-Half
- Current team: Manawatu
Senior career
Years	Team	Apps	(Points)
2010, 2024	Manawatu	13	(15)
2011–2014	Auckland	41	(60)
2012	Blues	13	(10)
2013	Kings	5	(0)
2013	Eastern Province Kings	2	(5)
2014	Hurricanes	6	(5)
2014–2020	Scarlets	122	(60)
2020–2022	Panasonic Wild Knights	23	(35)
2022–2024	Black Rams Tokyo	20	(10)
- Correct as of 13 August 2020
International career
Years	Team	Apps	(Points)
2017−2020	Wales	29	(30)
- Correct as of 13 August 2020

Hadleigh William Parkes (born 5 October 1987) is a New Zealand-born Welsh international rugby union player, whose favoured position is at the centre. He currently is assistant coach for Auckland NPC 2026.

== Club career ==
=== Super Rugby ===
Parkes made his provincial debut in 2010 for Manawatu. In 2011, he relocated to Auckland and in 2012 made his debut with the Blues.

After one season with the Blues, he joined the Southern Kings for the 2013 season on a one-year contract. After being an unused substitute in the Southern Kings' first ever game against the Force, he did make his debut for them by coming off the bench in their second game of the season against the Sharks and then started in their next three games. However, he suffered a broken arm in the Kings' match against the Hurricanes in Wellington and was out of action for more than three months. He made his return for the final match of the season, starting as a winger against the Sharks. He also played in both 2013 Super Rugby promotion/relegation matches, failing to help the Kings retain their Super Rugby status.

He made his first of two appearances in the South African domestic Currie Cup competition in the opening fixture of the 2013 Currie Cup First Division season, when he started the match against the Pumas.

He returned to New Zealand after the Super Rugby promotion/relegation matches to captain Auckland in the 2013 ITM Cup.

=== Scarlets ===
After the end of the 2014 ITM Cup season, Parkes moved to the Scarlets, one of the four professional Welsh regional teams. He was reunited with former Auckland head coach Wayne Pivac at the West Wales region.

Parkes made his debut off the bench in a European Rugby Champions Cup match against Ulster. His first start came two weeks later in the West Wales derby against the Ospreys. Parkes scored his first Scarlets try against Munster, and he was also awarded man of the match for his performance in that game. Then in 2016/2017 season he and the Scarlets won the Pro14 title with a win over Munster. That earned him a permanent place at centre for the Scarlets.

His good form at the start of the 2017/2018 season earned him his first Wales cap under the 3-year residence rule. He played a huge part in Scarlets coming 1st in the Pro14 and reaching the final losing to Leinster who they also lost to in the Champions Cup semi finals which Leinster won. Despite Wales having big success in 2018/2019, the Scarlets struggled and came 4th missing out on a Pro14 play off spots and missing out on the Champions Cup for the first time in years. Scarlets coach Wayne Pivac departed for Wales with fellow New Zealander Brad Mooar coming in but Parkes and his fellow Wales teammates have not played much of the 2019/2020 because of 2019 World Cup and 2020 Six Nations.

=== Japan and return to New Zealand ===
In April 2020, Parkes left the Scarlets to join Japanese team Panasonic Wild Knights, which would end his Wales and Scarlets career. He played two seasons for Panasonic Wild Knights and then two more with Black Rams Tokyo.

In August 2024 Parkes rejoined the Manawatu Turbos for the 2024 Bunnings NPC.

In 2026 he was appointed Auckland NPC Assistant coach

== International career ==
=== Wales ===
Parkes was selected in the Wales national team for the 2017 Autumn International fixtures and made his debut in the final match against South Africa on 2 December 2017, after he became eligible under the three years residence criteria; he played at inside centre and was named man of the match after scoring two tries. His form in the Autumn Internationals and for Scarlets saw him selected to start against Scotland, England, Ireland and Italy in the 2018 Six Nations Championship, scoring a try and earning the man of the match award against Italy. On Saturday 16 March 2019 he scored Wales's only try in the second minute of their 25-7 Grand Slam victory over Ireland in Cardiff, courtesy of a crafty chip over the Irish defence from fly-half and fellow New Zealander Gareth Anscombe.

In 2019 he was called up for Wales for the 2019 Rugby World Cup squad where a he scored a try v Australia. Parkes played in 6 of the 7 games at the World Cup with Wales coming 4th, losing to eventual winners South Africa in the semi-finals.

=== International tries ===
Try	Opponent	Location	Venue	Competition	Date	Result
1	South Africa	Cardiff, Wales	Millennium Stadium	2017 Autumn Internationals	2 December 2017	Win
2	South Africa	Cardiff, Wales	Millennium Stadium	2017 Autumn Internationals	2 December 2017	Win
3	Italy	Cardiff, Wales	Millennium Stadium	2018 Six Nations	11 March 2018	Win
4	Ireland	Cardiff, Wales	Millennium Stadium	2019 Six Nations	16 March 2019	Win
5	Ireland	Dublin, Ireland	Aviva Stadium	2019 Rugby World Cup warm-up matches	7 September 2019	Loss
6	Australia	Tokyo, Japan	Ajinomoto Stadium	2019 Rugby World Cup	29 September 2019	Win
