= Tom Price (rugby union, born 1993) =

English rugby union footballer

- Born: Thomas Price; 22 January 1993 (age 33) Leamington Spa, England
- Height: 2.03 m (6 ft 8 in)
- Weight: 117 kg (18 st 6 lb; 258 lb)

Rugby union career
- Current team: Scarlets
Senior career
Years	Team	Apps	(Points)
2013	Leicester Tigers	6	(0)
2015–2019	Scarlets	56	(0)
2015–2019	Llanelli	15	(5)
2018	Llandovery	2	(10)
2019–2021	Exeter Chiefs	10	(10)
2021–	Scarlets	9	(0)
- Correct as of 20 October 2022
International career
Years	Team	Apps	(Points)
2013	England U20		
- Correct as of 23 October 2018

Thomas Price (born 22 January 1993) is an English rugby union player who plays for Scarlets as a second row. He was an England under-20 international playing a part in England's winning 2013 IRB Junior World Championship team.

After playing junior rugby with Stratford-upon-Avon RFC, Price began his professional career with Leicester Tigers before joining Scarlets in 2015.

On 24 March 2019, Price returned to the Premiership Rugby with Exeter Chiefs from the 2019–20 season. On 13 July 2021, Price rejoined Welsh region Scarlets in the United Rugby Championship from the 2021–22 season.
