= Will Boyde =

Welsh rugby union footballer

- Born: William Boyde; 15 December 1994 (age 31) Narberth, Wales
- Height: 183 cm (6 ft 0 in)
- Weight: 106 kg (16 st 10 lb)
- School: Coleg Sir Gar

Rugby union career
- Position(s): Openside Flanker; Number 8
- Current team: Cardiff Blues
Senior career
Years	Team	Apps	(Points)
2013-2019	Carmarthen Quins	39	(40)
- Correct as of 20 December 2016
Provincial / State sides
Years	Team	Apps	(Points)
2014-2019	Scarlets	83	(25)
2019-	Cardiff Blues	21	(10)
- Correct as of 13 March 2021
International career
Years	Team	Apps	(Points)
2013-14	Wales U20	10	(5)
- Correct as of 18:47, 8 December 2019 (UTC)

William Boyde (born 15 December 1994) is a Welsh rugby union player who plays for the Cardiff Blues at flanker, he can also play Number 8. He was a Wales under-20 international.

Boyde made his debut for the Scarlets in 2014, whilst also playing for feeder club Carmarthen Quins. Boyde was released from the Scarlets at the end of the 2018-2019 Pro14 season. He was signed by the Cardiff Blues following season, making his competitive debut in a 27–31 win against the Southern Kings.
