= Nicky Thomas (rugby union) =

Welsh rugby union player (born 1994)

- Born: Ian Nicholas Thomas; 26 August 1994 (age 32) Swansea, Wales
- Height: 6 ft 3 in (1.91 m)
- Weight: 18 st 10 lb (119 kg)
- School: Pentrehafod Comprehensive School

Rugby union career
- Position: Tighthead Prop
Amateur team(s)
Years	Team	Apps	(Points)
- Waunarlwydd RFC
Senior career
Years	Team	Apps	(Points)
2012–2014	Swansea	30	(3)
2013–2015	Aberavon	14	(5)
2015–2016	Gloucester	9	(0)
2016–2019	Llanelli	3	(0)
2019–2020	Bristol Bears	6	(0)
2021	Wasps		
- Correct as of 24 February 2021
Provincial / State sides
Years	Team	Apps	(Points)
2012–2014	Ospreys	5	(0)
2016–2019	Scarlets	6	(0)
2017–2018	→Dragons	0	(0)
2020–	Ospreys		
International career
Years	Team	Apps	(Points)
2013–2014	Wales U20	20	(0)
- Correct as of 20 June 2014

Ian Nicholas Thomas (born 26 August 1994) is a Welsh professional rugby union footballer, currently playing for Wasps in Premiership Rugby on loan from Ospreys in the Pro14.

== Club career ==
Thomas made his senior debut for Swansea on 19 September 2012, coming on as a replacement in a 14–25 home loss to Cross Keys. Thomas impressed many with his performances for Swansea during the 2012–13 season and earned a call-up to the Ospreys regional team, making his professional debut on 9 November 2012 in a 33–27 win against Gloucester in the LV= Cup.

On 28 January 2015, it was announced Thomas would be joining Gloucester at the start of the 2015–16 season.

On 19 October 2016, it was announced that Thomas would be joining the Scarlets from Gloucester with immediate effect.

On 3 July 2019, Thomas signs a one-year deal with Bristol Bears in the Premiership Rugby for the 2019–20 season.

On 9 March 2020, Thomas would rejoin his home region Ospreys on a two-year deal in the Pro14 from the 2020–21 season. He joined Premiership Rugby side Wasps on a short-term deal in February 2021.

== International career ==
Thomas made his debut for Wales U20 on the 1 February 2013 in a 17–15 win against Ireland U20 in the U20 Six Nations. He went on to make 20 appearances for the U20's, including starting the 2013 IRB Junior World Championship final loss against England U20.
