= Jack Condy =

Welsh rugby union player

- Born: Jack Condy; 1 December 1994 (age 31) Aberbargoed, Wales
- Height: 185 cm (6 ft 1 in)
- Weight: 109 kg (17 st 2 lb)
- University: Ystrad Mynach College

Rugby union career
- Position: Number 8
Senior career
Years	Team	Apps	(Points)
2013–2015	Cross Keys	24	(20)
2015–2018	Llanelli RFC	23	(12)
2015–2018	Scarlets	19	(5)
- Correct as of 26 February 2018
International career
Years	Team	Apps	(Points)
- Wales U18
- Correct as of 23 November 2016

Jack Condy (born 1 December 1994) is a former Welsh rugby union player who last played for the Scarlets as a number 8.

== Professional career ==
In 2015, Condy signed for the Scarlets, having turned down the Dragons, despite playing for partner club Cross Keys RFC.

On 26 February 2018, Condy announced that after problems with a knee injury, he would be retiring from rugby. He made 19 appearances for the Scarlets, and featured 23 times for Llanelli RFC.

After his retirement, Condy began coaching with his former youth club Penallta RFC. Condy later joined the Dragons Academy as management, coaching the U18 team.
