= 2018 Six Nations Championship squads =

Rugby union competition squads

This is a list of the complete squads for the 2018 Six Nations Championship, an annual rugby union tournament contested by the national rugby teams of England, France, Ireland, Italy, Scotland and Wales. England were the defending champions.

Note: Number of caps and players' ages are indicated as of 3 February 2018 – the tournament's opening day.

== England ==
On 18 January, Eddie Jones named a 35-man squad ahead of their opening Championship match, against Italy.

Head coach: (Australia) Eddie Jones

Player	Position	Date of birth (age)	Caps	Club/province
Tom Dunn	Hooker	12 November 1992 (aged 25)	0	(England) Bath
Jamie George	Hooker	20 October 1990 (aged 27)	20	(England) Saracens
Dylan Hartley (c)	Hooker	24 March 1986 (aged 31)	89	(England) Northampton Saints
Lewis Boyce	Prop	30 June 1996 (aged 21)	0	(England) Harlequins
Dan Cole	Prop	9 May 1987 (aged 30)	77	(England) Leicester Tigers
Alec Hepburn	Prop	30 March 1993 (aged 24)	0	(England) Exeter Chiefs
Kyle Sinckler	Prop	30 March 1993 (aged 24)	8	(England) Harlequins
Mako Vunipola	Prop	14 January 1991 (aged 27)	44	(England) Saracens
Harry Williams	Prop	1 October 1991 (aged 26)	5	(England) Exeter Chiefs
Nick Isiekwe	Lock	20 April 1998 (aged 19)	2	(England) Saracens
Maro Itoje	Lock	28 October 1994 (aged 23)	14	(England) Saracens
George Kruis	Lock	22 February 1990 (aged 27)	21	(England) Saracens
Joe Launchbury	Lock	12 April 1991 (aged 26)	47	(England) Wasps
Courtney Lawes	Lock	23 February 1989 (aged 28)	61	(England) Northampton Saints
Gary Graham	Flanker	29 August 1992 (aged 25)	0	(England) Newcastle Falcons
Zach Mercer	Flanker	28 February 1997 (aged 20)	0	(England) Bath
Chris Robshaw	Flanker	4 June 1986 (aged 31)	59	(England) Harlequins
Sam Underhill	Flanker	22 July 1996 (aged 21)	3	(England) Bath
Sam Simmonds	Number 8	10 November 1994 (aged 23)	3	(England) Exeter Chiefs
Danny Care	Scrum-half	2 January 1987 (aged 31)	76	(England) Harlequins
Ben Youngs	Scrum-half	5 September 1989 (aged 28)	73	(England) Leicester Tigers
George Ford	Fly-half	16 March 1993 (aged 24)	40	(England) Leicester Tigers
Alex Lozowski	Fly-half	30 June 1993 (aged 24)	4	(England) Saracens
Marcus Smith	Fly-half	14 February 1999 (aged 18)	0	(England) Harlequins
Owen Farrell	Centre	24 September 1991 (aged 26)	53	(England) Saracens
Jonathan Joseph	Centre	18 May 1991 (aged 26)	35	(England) Bath
Henry Slade	Centre	19 March 1993 (aged 24)	10	(England) Exeter Chiefs
Ben Te'o	Centre	27 January 1987 (aged 31)	8	(England) Worcester Warriors
Nathan Earle	Wing	25 September 1994 (aged 23)	0	(England) Saracens
Jack Nowell	Wing	11 April 1993 (aged 24)	23	(England) Exeter Chiefs
Jonny May	Wing	1 April 1990 (aged 27)	29	(England) Leicester Tigers
Denny Solomona	Wing	27 September 1993 (aged 24)	2	(England) Sale Sharks
Anthony Watson	Wing	26 February 1994 (aged 23)	28	(England) Bath
Mike Brown	Fullback	4 September 1985 (aged 32)	64	(England) Harlequins
Harry Mallinder	Fullback	13 June 1996 (aged 21)	0	(England) Northampton Saints

=== Call-ups ===
On 29 January, James Haskell and Joe Marler were called up to the squad, although are unavailable for selection for the earlier rounds due to suspension.

On 5 February, Eddie Jones called up Luke Cowan-Dickie, Nathan Hughes and Richard Wigglesworth, with Wigglesworth replacing Ben Youngs who was injured in round one.

On 12 February, Sam Moore and Gabriel Ibitoye joined the squad during the first break, with Ibitoye joining Marcus Smith as an apprentice player.

On 26 February, Charlie Ewels was brought into the squad as part of the training squad ahead of the French game.

On 3 March, Ewels remained with the squad, whilst Elliot Daly rejoined the squad after recovering for injury.

On 11 March, Don Armand joined the squad as an injury replacement for Nathan Hughes who was ruled out of the final round.

Player	Position	Date of birth (age)	Caps	Club/province
Luke Cowan-Dickie	Hooker	20 June 1993 (aged 24)	6	(England) Exeter Chiefs
Joe Marler	Prop	7 July 1990 (aged 27)	72	(England) Harlequins
Charlie Ewels	Lock	29 June 1995 (aged 22)	6	(England) Bath
Don Armand	Flanker	23 September 1988 (aged 29)	1	(England) Exeter Chiefs
James Haskell	Flanker	2 April 1985 (aged 32)	75	(England) Wasps
Nathan Hughes	Number 8	10 June 1991 (aged 26)	12	(England) Wasps
Sam Moore	Number 8	9 September 1998 (aged 19)	0	(England) Sale Sharks
Richard Wigglesworth	Scrum-half	9 June 1983 (aged 34)	27	(England) Saracens
Gabriel Ibitoye	Centre	5 March 1998 (aged 19)	0	(England) Harlequins
Elliot Daly	Wing	8 October 1992 (aged 25)	16	(England) Wasps

== France ==
On the 17 January, Jacques Brunel named a 32-man squad ahead of France's opening Championship match against Ireland.

Head coach: (France) Jacques Brunel

Player	Position	Date of birth (age)	Caps	Club/province
Camille Chat	Hooker	18 December 1995 (aged 22)	10	(France) Racing 92
Guilhem Guirado (c)	Hooker	17 June 1986 (aged 31)	56	(France) Toulon
Christopher Tolofua	Hooker	31 December 1993 (aged 24)	7	(England) Saracens
Eddy Ben Arous	Prop	25 August 1990 (aged 27)	19	(France) Racing 92
Cedate Gomes Sa	Prop	7 August 1993 (aged 24)	0	(France) Racing 92
Jefferson Poirot	Prop	1 November 1992 (aged 25)	14	(France) Bordeaux Bègles
Dany Priso	Prop	2 January 1994 (aged 24)	0	(France) La Rochelle
Rabah Slimani	Prop	18 October 1989 (aged 28)	41	(France) Clermont Auvergne
Paul Gabrillagues	Lock	3 June 1993 (aged 24)	2	(France) Stade Français
Arthur Iturria	Lock	13 May 1994 (aged 23)	1	(France) Clermont Auvergne
Félix Lambey	Lock	15 March 1994 (aged 23)	0	(France) Lyon
Sébastien Vahaamahina	Lock	21 October 1991 (aged 26)	28	(France) Clermont Auvergne
Yacouba Camara	Flanker	2 June 1994 (aged 23)	6	(France) Montpellier
Kevin Gourdon	Flanker	23 January 1990 (aged 28)	15	(France) La Rochelle
Anthony Jelonch	Flanker	28 July 1996 (aged 21)	2	(France) Castres
Wenceslas Lauret	Flanker	28 March 1989 (aged 28)	12	(France) Racing 92
Sekou Macalou	Flanker	20 April 1995 (aged 22)	1	(France) Stade Français
Marco Tauleigne	Number 8	30 August 1993 (aged 24)	0	(France) Bordeaux Bègles
Antoine Dupont	Scrum-half	15 November 1996 (aged 21)	6	(France) Toulouse
Maxime Machenaud	Scrum-half	30 December 1988 (aged 29)	31	(France) Racing 92
Morgan Parra	Scrum-half	15 November 1988 (aged 29)	66	(France) Clermont Auvergne
Anthony Belleau	Fly-half	8 April 1996 (aged 21)	2	(France) Toulon
Matthieu Jalibert	Fly-half	6 November 1998 (aged 19)	0	(France) Bordeaux Bègles
Henry Chavancy	Centre	22 May 1988 (aged 29)	3	(France) Racing 92
Jonathan Danty	Centre	7 October 1990 (aged 27)	4	(France) Stade Français
Geoffrey Doumayrou	Centre	16 September 1989 (aged 28)	2	(France) La Rochelle
Rémi Lamerat	Centre	14 January 1990 (aged 28)	16	(France) Clermont Auvergne
Benjamin Fall	Wing	3 March 1989 (aged 28)	6	(France) Montpellier
Teddy Thomas	Wing	18 September 1993 (aged 24)	8	(France) Racing 92
Virimi Vakatawa	Wing	1 May 1992 (aged 25)	15	(France) Racing 92
Brice Dulin	Fullback	13 April 1990 (aged 27)	29	(France) Racing 92
Geoffrey Palis	Fullback	8 July 1991 (aged 26)	0	(France) Castres

=== Call-ups ===
On 22 January, Hugo Bonneval and Baptiste Serin were added to the squad as injury cover for Brice Dulin and Morgan Parra who were injured in the final round of the European Champions Cup.

On 24 January, Camille Chat was unable to join the group because of flu like symptoms. He was replaced by Adrien Pélissié.

On 25 January, Anthony Jelonch injured himself in training and was replaced by Alexandre Lapandry.

On 30 January, Christopher Tolofua injured himself, he was not replaced by another player.

On 5 February, Lionel Beauxis, Baptiste Couilloud, and Louis Picamoles where called up to replace Matthieu Jalibert, Antoine Dupont, and Kévin Gourdon respectively, who were injured in the first match against Ireland.

On 13 February, Mathieu Babillot, Camille Chat, François Trinh-Duc, Mathieu Bastareaud, Gaël Fickou, Kélian Galletier, Rémy Grosso, Bernard Le Roux, and Romain Taofifenua where called up to replace Anthony Belleau, Rémi Lamerat, Félix Lambey, Alexandre Lapandry, Sékou Macalou, Arthur Iturria, Louis Picamoles, Jonathan Danty, and Teddy Thomas respectively, who were suspended due to inappropriate behaviour after the second match against Scotland.

On 12 March, Pierre Bougarit was called up because of an injury to Guilhem Guirado which made him uncertain for the match against Wales. Whilst Arthur Iturria was called up to replace the injured Romain Taofifénua.

On 13 March, after an HIA protocol done 48 hours post-match on Hugo Bonneval after the England match, it was confirmed that he must now follow a gradual return to rugby protocol which does not allow him to train with the team until the Friday before the match against Wales, therefore Yoann Huget was called as a backup.

Player	Position	Date of birth (age)	Caps	Club/province
Pierre Bougarit	Hooker	12 September 1997 (age 29)	0	(France) La Rochelle
Adrien Pélissié	Hooker	7 August 1990 (aged 27)	0	(France) Bordeaux Bègles
Romain Taofifénua	Lock	14 September 1990 (aged 27)	12	(France) Toulon
Mathieu Babillot	Flanker	9 September 1993 (aged 24)	0	(France) Castres
Alexandre Lapandry	Flanker	13 April 1989 (aged 28)	10	(France) Clermont Auvergne
Bernard Le Roux	Flanker	4 June 1989 (aged 28)	27	(France) Racing 92
Kélian Galletier	Number 8	18 March 1992 (aged 25)	1	(France) Montpellier
Louis Picamoles	Number 8	5 February 1986 (aged 31)	68	(France) Montpellier
Baptiste Couilloud	Scrum-half	22 July 1997 (aged 20)	0	(France) Lyon
Baptiste Serin	Scrum-half	20 June 1994 (aged 23)	16	(France) Bordeaux Bègles
Lionel Beauxis	Fly-half	24 October 1985 (aged 32)	20	(France) Lyon
François Trinh-Duc	Fly-half	11 November 1986 (aged 31)	63	(France) Toulon
Mathieu Bastareaud	Centre	17 September 1988 (aged 29)	42	(France) Toulon
Gaël Fickou	Centre	26 March 1994 (aged 23)	32	(France) Toulouse
Rémy Grosso	Wing	4 December 1988 (aged 29)	1	(France) Clermont Auvergne
Yoann Huget	Wing	2 June 1987 (age 39)	51	(France) Toulouse
Hugo Bonneval	Fullback	19 November 1990 (aged 27)	9	(France) Toulon

== Ireland ==
On the 17 January, Joe Schmidt announced a 36-man squad for the opening two rounds of the Championship.

Head coach: (New Zealand) Joe Schmidt

Player	Position	Date of birth (age)	Caps	Club/province
Rory Best (c)	Hooker	15 August 1982 (aged 35)	106	(Ireland) Ulster
Seán Cronin	Hooker	6 May 1986 (aged 31)	56	(Ireland) Leinster
Rob Herring	Hooker	27 August 1990 (aged 27)	3	(Ireland) Ulster
Tadhg Furlong	Prop	14 November 1992 (aged 25)	19	(Ireland) Leinster
Cian Healy	Prop	7 October 1987 (aged 30)	73	(Ireland) Leinster
Dave Kilcoyne	Prop	14 December 1988 (aged 29)	22	(Ireland) Munster
Jack McGrath	Prop	11 October 1989 (aged 28)	42	(Ireland) Leinster
Andrew Porter	Prop	16 January 1996 (aged 22)	3	(Ireland) Leinster
John Ryan	Prop	2 August 1988 (aged 29)	11	(Ireland) Munster
Ultan Dillane	Lock	9 November 1993 (aged 24)	11	(Ireland) Connacht
Iain Henderson	Lock	21 February 1992 (aged 25)	34	(Ireland) Ulster
Quinn Roux	Lock	30 October 1990 (aged 27)	3	(Ireland) Connacht
James Ryan	Lock	24 July 1996 (aged 21)	4	(Ireland) Leinster
Devin Toner	Lock	29 June 1986 (aged 31)	53	(Ireland) Leinster
Dan Leavy	Flanker	23 May 1994 (aged 23)	4	(Ireland) Leinster
Jordi Murphy	Flanker	22 April 1991 (aged 26)	18	(Ireland) Leinster
Peter O'Mahony	Flanker	17 September 1989 (aged 28)	42	(Ireland) Munster
Josh van der Flier	Flanker	25 April 1993 (aged 24)	9	(Ireland) Leinster
Jack Conan	Number 8	29 July 1992 (aged 25)	5	(Ireland) Leinster
CJ Stander	Number 8	5 April 1990 (aged 27)	18	(Ireland) Munster
Kieran Marmion	Scrum-half	11 February 1992 (aged 25)	18	(Ireland) Connacht
Luke McGrath	Scrum-half	3 February 1993 (aged 25)	6	(Ireland) Leinster
Conor Murray	Scrum-half	20 April 1989 (aged 28)	59	(Ireland) Munster
Joey Carbery	Fly-half	1 November 1995 (aged 22)	6	(Ireland) Leinster
Ian Keatley	Fly-half	1 April 1987 (aged 30)	7	(Ireland) Munster
Johnny Sexton	Fly-half	11 July 1985 (aged 32)	68	(Ireland) Leinster
Bundee Aki	Centre	7 April 1990 (aged 27)	2	(Ireland) Connacht
Chris Farrell	Centre	16 March 1993 (aged 24)	2	(Ireland) Munster
Robbie Henshaw	Centre	12 June 1993 (aged 24)	31	(Ireland) Leinster
Rory Scannell	Centre	22 December 1993 (aged 24)	3	(Ireland) Munster
Andrew Conway	Wing	11 July 1991 (aged 26)	6	(Ireland) Munster
Keith Earls	Wing	2 October 1987 (aged 30)	62	(Ireland) Munster
Fergus McFadden	Wing	17 June 1986 (aged 31)	32	(Ireland) Leinster
Jacob Stockdale	Wing	6 April 1996 (aged 21)	4	(Ireland) Ulster
Rob Kearney	Fullback	26 March 1986 (aged 31)	78	(Ireland) Leinster
Jordan Larmour	Fullback	10 June 1997 (aged 20)	0	(Ireland) Leinster

=== Call-ups ===
On 22 January, James Cronin was added to the squad as injury cover for Dave Kilcoyne who was injured in the final round of the European Champions Cup.

On 19 February, John Cooney, Garry Ringrose and Niall Scannell were called into the squad ahead of the round 3 clash with Wales as injury cover for Luke McGrath, Robbie Henshaw and Rob Herring.

Player	Position	Date of birth (age)	Caps	Club/province
Niall Scannell	Hooker	8 April 1992 (aged 25)	7	(Ireland) Munster
James Cronin	Prop	23 November 1990 (aged 27)	3	(Ireland) Munster
John Cooney	Scrum-half	1 May 1990 (aged 27)	1	(Ireland) Ulster
Garry Ringrose	Centre	26 January 1995 (aged 23)	11	(Ireland) Leinster

== Italy ==
On the 25 January, Conor O'Shea announced a 31-man squad for the opening two rounds of the Championship.

Head coach: (Ireland) Conor O'Shea

Note: Flags indicate national union for the club/province as defined by World Rugby.

Player	Position	Date of birth (age)	Caps	Club/province
Luca Bigi	Hooker	19 April 1991 (aged 26)	6	(Italy) Benetton
Oliviero Fabiani	Hooker	13 July 1990 (aged 27)	4	(Italy) Zebre
Leonardo Ghiraldini	Hooker	26 December 1984 (aged 33)	89	(France) Toulouse
Simone Ferrari	Prop	28 March 1994 (aged 23)	8	(Italy) Benetton
Andrea Lovotti	Prop	28 July 1989 (aged 28)	20	(Italy) Zebre
Tiziano Pasquali	Prop	14 July 1994 (aged 23)	2	(Italy) Benetton
Nicola Quaglio	Prop	9 March 1991 (aged 26)	2	(Italy) Benetton
Marco Riccioni	Prop	19 October 1997 (aged 20)	0	(Italy) Benetton
George Biagi	Lock	4 October 1985 (aged 32)	19	(Italy) Zebre
Dean Budd	Lock	31 July 1986 (aged 31)	6	(Italy) Benetton
Federico Ruzza	Lock	4 August 1994 (aged 23)	3	(Italy) Benetton
Alessandro Zanni	Lock	31 January 1984 (aged 34)	99	(Italy) Benetton
Renato Giammarioli	Flanker	23 March 1995 (aged 22)	1	(Italy) Zebre
Giovanni Licata	Flanker	18 February 1997 (aged 20)	3	(Italy) Fiamme Oro
Maxime Mbanda	Flanker	10 April 1993 (aged 24)	11	(Italy) Zebre
Sebastian Negri	Flanker	30 June 1994 (aged 23)	2	(Italy) Benetton
Sergio Parisse (c)	Number 8	12 September 1983 (aged 34)	129	(France) Stade Français
Braam Steyn	Number 8	2 May 1992 (aged 25)	17	(Italy) Benetton
Edoardo Gori	Scrum-half	5 March 1990 (aged 27)	65	(Italy) Benetton
Marcello Violi	Scrum-half	11 October 1993 (aged 24)	8	(Italy) Zebre
Tommaso Allan	Fly-half	26 April 1993 (aged 24)	33	(Italy) Benetton
Carlo Canna	Fly-half	25 August 1992 (aged 25)	25	(Italy) Zebre
Ian McKinley	Fly-half	4 December 1989 (aged 28)	3	(Italy) Benetton
Tommaso Benvenuti	Centre	12 December 1990 (aged 27)	45	(Italy) Benetton
Giulio Bisegni	Centre	4 April 1992 (aged 25)	7	(Italy) Zebre
Tommaso Boni	Centre	15 January 1993 (aged 25)	8	(Italy) Zebre
Tommaso Castello	Centre	14 August 1991 (aged 26)	5	(Italy) Zebre
Mattia Bellini	Wing	8 February 1994 (aged 23)	8	(Italy) Zebre
Matteo Minozzi	Wing	4 June 1996 (aged 21)	3	(Italy) Zebre
Jayden Hayward	Fullback	11 February 1987 (aged 30)	3	(Italy) Benetton
Edoardo Padovani	Fullback	15 May 1993 (aged 24)	14	(Italy) Zebre

=== Call-ups ===
On 27 February, O'Shea named a 32-man squad for the final two rounds of the Championship; Dario Chistolini, Luca Morisi, Guglielmo Palazzani, Jake Polledri and Federico Zani were new additions to the Championship squad.

Player	Position	Date of birth (age)	Caps	Club/province
Dario Chistolini	Prop	14 September 1988 (aged 29)	20	(Italy) Zebre
Federico Zani	Prop	9 April 1989 (aged 28)	6	(Italy) Benetton
Jake Polledri	Flanker	8 November 1995 (aged 22)	0	(England) Gloucester
Guglielmo Palazzani	Scrum-half	11 April 1991 (aged 26)	22	(Italy) Zebre
Luca Morisi	Centre	22 February 1991 (aged 26)	16	(Italy) Benetton

== Scotland ==
On the 16 January, Gregor Townsend named a 40-man squad for the Championship.

Head coach: (Scotland) Gregor Townsend

Player	Position	Date of birth (age)	Caps	Club/province
Scott Lawson	Hooker	28 September 1981 (aged 36)	46	(England) Newcastle Falcons
Stuart McInally	Hooker	9 August 1990 (aged 27)	12	(Scotland) Edinburgh
George Turner	Hooker	3 January 1991 (aged 27)	2	(Scotland) Glasgow Warriors
Simon Berghan	Prop	7 December 1990 (aged 27)	5	(Scotland) Edinburgh
Jamie Bhatti	Prop	8 September 1993 (aged 24)	3	(Scotland) Glasgow Warriors
Murray McCallum	Prop	16 March 1996 (aged 21)	0	(Scotland) Edinburgh
Gordon Reid	Prop	4 March 1987 (aged 30)	27	(England) London Irish
D'Arcy Rae	Prop	21 December 1994 (aged 23)	0	(Scotland) Glasgow Warriors
Jon Welsh	Prop	13 October 1986 (aged 31)	11	(England) Newcastle Falcons
Grant Gilchrist	Lock	9 August 1990 (aged 27)	18	(Scotland) Edinburgh
Jonny Gray	Lock	14 March 1994 (aged 23)	38	(Scotland) Glasgow Warriors
Richie Gray	Lock	24 August 1989 (aged 28)	64	(France) Toulouse
Ben Toolis	Lock	31 March 1992 (aged 25)	7	(Scotland) Edinburgh
John Barclay (c)	Flanker	24 September 1986 (aged 31)	66	(Wales) Scarlets
Magnus Bradbury	Flanker	23 August 1995 (aged 22)	2	(Scotland) Edinburgh
Luke Hamilton	Flanker	7 January 1992 (aged 26)	1	(England) Leicester Tigers
Rob Harley	Flanker	26 May 1990 (aged 27)	20	(Scotland) Glasgow Warriors
Hamish Watson	Flanker	15 October 1991 (aged 26)	15	(Scotland) Edinburgh
David Denton	Number 8	5 February 1990 (aged 27)	35	(England) Worcester Warriors
Cornell du Preez	Number 8	23 March 1991 (aged 26)	5	(Scotland) Edinburgh
Ryan Wilson	Number 8	18 May 1989 (aged 28)	32	(Scotland) Glasgow Warriors
Nathan Fowles	Scrum-half	8 April 1993 (aged 24)	0	(Scotland) Edinburgh
Greig Laidlaw	Scrum-half	12 October 1985 (aged 32)	58	(France) Clermont Auvergne
Ali Price	Scrum-half	12 May 1993 (aged 24)	11	(Scotland) Glasgow Warriors
Henry Pyrgos	Scrum-half	9 July 1989 (aged 28)	27	(Scotland) Glasgow Warriors
Peter Horne	Fly-half	5 October 1989 (aged 28)	28	(Scotland) Glasgow Warriors
Ruaridh Jackson	Fly-half	12 February 1988 (aged 29)	32	(Scotland) Glasgow Warriors
Finn Russell	Fly-half	23 September 1992 (aged 25)	32	(Scotland) Glasgow Warriors
Mark Bennett	Centre	3 February 1993 (aged 25)	20	(Scotland) Edinburgh
Alex Dunbar	Centre	23 April 1990 (aged 27)	28	(Scotland) Glasgow Warriors
Nick Grigg	Centre	18 September 1992 (aged 25)	1	(Scotland) Glasgow Warriors
Chris Harris	Centre	28 December 1990 (aged 27)	1	(England) Newcastle Falcons
Huw Jones	Centre	17 December 1993 (aged 24)	11	(Scotland) Glasgow Warriors
Duncan Taylor	Centre	5 September 1989 (aged 28)	21	(England) Saracens
Lee Jones	Wing	28 June 1988 (aged 29)	7	(Scotland) Glasgow Warriors
Sean Maitland	Wing	14 September 1988 (aged 29)	29	(England) Saracens
Byron McGuigan	Wing	20 August 1989 (aged 28)	2	(England) Sale Sharks
Tommy Seymour	Wing	1 July 1988 (aged 29)	39	(Scotland) Glasgow Warriors
Stuart Hogg	Fullback	24 June 1992 (aged 25)	55	(Scotland) Glasgow Warriors
Blair Kinghorn	Fullback	18 January 1997 (aged 21)	0	(Scotland) Edinburgh

=== Call-ups ===
On 22 January, Neil Cochrane was added to the squad as injury cover for George Turner who was injured in the final round of the European Champions Cup.

On 17 February, Matt Scott and Tim Swinson were called up to the squad as injury replacements for Duncan Taylor and Richie Gray, whilst James Malcolm, WP Nel, Josh Strauss and Tim Visser joined the squad, replacing Murray McCallum, D'Arcy Rae, Magnus Bradbury and Nathan Fowles.

On 5 March, Fraser Brown, Zander Fagerson, John Hardie, George Horne and Darryl Marfo were called up ahead of the Irish test in round 4, with Brown, Fagerson and Marfo rejoining the squad after recovering from respective injuries.

On 12 March, Scott Cummings, Matt Fagerson, Adam Hastings and Richie Vernon joined the squad ahead of the final round game against Italy.

Player	Position	Date of birth (age)	Caps	Club/province
Neil Cochrane	Hooker	4 January 1984 (aged 34)	0	(Scotland) Edinburgh
Fraser Brown	Hooker	20 June 1989 (aged 28)	29	(Scotland) Glasgow Warriors
James Malcolm	Hooker	23 September 1994 (aged 23)	0	(Scotland) Glasgow Warriors
Zander Fagerson	Prop	19 January 1996 (aged 22)	15	(Scotland) Glasgow Warriors
Darryl Marfo	Prop	11 January 1990 (aged 28)	3	(Scotland) Edinburgh
WP Nel	Prop	30 April 1986 (aged 31)	19	(Scotland) Edinburgh
Scott Cummings	Lock	3 December 1996 (aged 21)	0	(Scotland) Glasgow Warriors
Tim Swinson	Lock	17 February 1987 (aged 30)	33	(Scotland) Glasgow Warriors
Matt Fagerson	Flanker	16 July 1998 (aged 19)	0	(Scotland) Glasgow Warriors
John Hardie	Flanker	27 July 1988 (aged 29)	16	(Scotland) Edinburgh
Josh Strauss	Number 8	23 October 1986 (aged 31)	14	(England) Sale Sharks
George Horne	Scrum-half	12 May 1995 (aged 22)	0	(Scotland) Glasgow Warriors
Adam Hastings	Fly-half	5 October 1996 (aged 21)	0	(Scotland) Glasgow Warriors
Matt Scott	Centre	30 September 1990 (aged 27)	39	(England) Gloucester
Richie Vernon	Centre	7 July 1987 (aged 30)	24	(Scotland) Glasgow Warriors
Tim Visser	Wing	29 May 1987 (aged 30)	33	(England) Harlequins

== Wales ==
On the 16 January, Warren Gatland named a 39-man squad for the Championship.

Head coach: (New Zealand) Warren Gatland

Player	Position	Date of birth (age)	Caps	Club/province
Scott Baldwin	Hooker	12 July 1988 (aged 29)	34	(Wales) Ospreys
Elliot Dee	Hooker	7 March 1994 (aged 23)	2	(Wales) Dragons
Ken Owens	Hooker	3 January 1987 (aged 31)	52	(Wales) Scarlets
Rob Evans	Prop	14 April 1992 (aged 25)	20	(Wales) Scarlets
Tomas Francis	Prop	27 April 1992 (aged 25)	26	(England) Exeter Chiefs
Wyn Jones	Prop	26 February 1992 (aged 25)	5	(Wales) Scarlets
Samson Lee	Prop	30 November 1992 (aged 25)	34	(Wales) Scarlets
Dillon Lewis	Prop	4 January 1996 (aged 22)	2	(Wales) Cardiff Blues
Nicky Smith	Prop	7 April 1994 (aged 23)	16	(Wales) Ospreys
Adam Beard	Lock	7 January 1996 (aged 22)	2	(Wales) Ospreys
Bradley Davies	Lock	9 January 1987 (aged 31)	57	(Wales) Ospreys
Seb Davies	Lock	15 May 1996 (aged 21)	3	(Wales) Cardiff Blues
Cory Hill	Lock	10 February 1992 (aged 25)	10	(Wales) Dragons
Alun Wyn Jones (c)	Lock	19 September 1985 (aged 32)	113	(Wales) Ospreys
James Davies	Flanker	25 October 1990 (aged 27)	0	(Wales) Scarlets
Ellis Jenkins	Flanker	29 April 1993 (aged 24)	5	(Wales) Cardiff Blues
Josh Navidi	Flanker	30 December 1990 (aged 27)	7	(Wales) Cardiff Blues
Aaron Shingler	Flanker	7 August 1987 (aged 30)	13	(Wales) Scarlets
Justin Tipuric	Flanker	6 August 1989 (aged 28)	52	(Wales) Ospreys
Taulupe Faletau	Number 8	12 November 1990 (aged 27)	70	(England) Bath
Ross Moriarty	Number 8	18 April 1994 (aged 23)	17	(England) Gloucester
Aled Davies	Scrum-half	19 July 1992 (aged 25)	5	(Wales) Scarlets
Gareth Davies	Scrum-half	18 August 1990 (aged 27)	27	(Wales) Scarlets
Rhys Webb	Scrum-half	9 December 1988 (aged 29)	31	(Wales) Ospreys
Gareth Anscombe	Fly-half	10 May 1991 (aged 26)	11	(Wales) Cardiff Blues
Dan Biggar	Fly-half	16 October 1989 (aged 28)	60	(Wales) Ospreys
Rhys Patchell	Fly-half	17 May 1993 (aged 24)	5	(Wales) Scarlets
Rhys Priestland	Fly-half	9 January 1987 (aged 31)	50	(England) Bath
Hadleigh Parkes	Centre	5 October 1987 (aged 30)	1	(Wales) Scarlets
Owen Watkin	Centre	12 October 1996 (aged 21)	2	(Wales) Ospreys
Owen Williams	Centre	27 February 1992 (aged 25)	3	(England) Gloucester
Scott Williams	Centre	10 October 1990 (aged 27)	51	(Wales) Scarlets
Josh Adams	Wing	21 April 1995 (aged 22)	0	(England) Worcester Warriors
Hallam Amos	Wing	24 September 1994 (aged 23)	15	(Wales) Dragons
Alex Cuthbert	Wing	5 April 1990 (aged 27)	47	(Wales) Cardiff Blues
Steff Evans	Wing	1 September 1994 (aged 23)	5	(Wales) Scarlets
George North	Wing	13 April 1992 (aged 25)	69	(England) Northampton Saints
Leigh Halfpenny	Fullback	22 December 1988 (aged 29)	74	(Wales) Scarlets
Liam Williams	Fullback	9 April 1991 (aged 26)	45	(England) Saracens

=== Call-ups ===
On 25 January, Rhys Webb was ruled out of the competition due to injury, Tomos Williams replaced Webb in the squad.

On 1 February, Scott Baldwin was released from the squad due to injury, ruling him out of the whole tournament. Ryan Elias was added as his replacement.

On 6 March, Rhodri Jones was drafted into the squad as an injury replacement for Wyn Jones.

Player	Position	Date of birth (age)	Caps	Club/province
Ryan Elias	Hooker	7 January 1995 (aged 23)	2	(Wales) Scarlets
Rhodri Jones	Prop	23 December 1991 (aged 26)	15	(Wales) Ospreys
Tomos Williams	Scrum-half	1 January 1995 (aged 23)	0	(Wales) Cardiff Blues
