= 2017 Wales rugby union tour of Tonga and Samoa =

- Date: 16–23 June 2017
- Coach: Warren Gatland
- Tour captain: Jamie Roberts
Summary
P	W	D	L
Total
2	2	0	0
Test match
2	2	0	0
Opponent
P	W	D	L
Tonga
1	1	0	0
Samoa
1	1	0	0

Tour chronology
- ← New Zealand 2016 Americas 2018 →

In 2017, the Wales national rugby union team's summer tour saw them play test matches against Tonga on 16 June and Samoa on 23 June. The match against Tonga was played in Auckland, New Zealand, due to concerns over the state of Teufaiva Sport Stadium in Nukuʻalofa. Wales won the match 24–6, before beating Samoa 19–17 in Apia. A veteran of the 2009 and 2013 Lions tours but unselected for their 2017 tour to New Zealand, centre Jamie Roberts captained Wales on this tour, which also saw lock Adam Beard make his international debut; Beard went on to play for the Lions on their 2021 tour to South Africa.

== Squad ==
With head coach Warren Gatland leading the British & Irish Lions on their tour to New Zealand, assisted by Wales attack coach Rob Howley, forwards coach Robin McBryde was named as coach for the tour to Tonga and Samoa, just as he had been in previous Lions years in 2009 and 2013. In December 2016, the Welsh Rugby Union (WRU) were reported to have approached Ospreys and Cardiff Blues head coaches Steve Tandy and Danny Wilson, and Scarlets backs coach Stephen Jones about supplementing McBryde's coaching staff. Wilson and Jones were appointed, along with Blues attack coach Matt Sherratt, but Wilson and Jones withdrew before the tour due to club commitments.

The Lions squad included 12 senior Wales players, resulting in 12 uncapped players being named in the 32-man squad for the tour, which was captained by centre Jamie Roberts. Ospreys lock Bradley Davies missed the tour due to the impending birth of his second child, while 38-cap veteran hooker Richard Hibbard was also omitted, and prop Gethin Jenkins missed the tour after undergoing knee surgery. Wing Steff Evans' place on the tour was put into doubt when he was sent off in the Scarlets' win over Munster in the Pro12 semi-finals; however, the red card was rescinded and he was cleared to play. Full-back Rhun Williams suffered an ankle injury in the Cardiff Blues' European Champions Cup qualifying match against Stade Français; he was subsequently replaced in the squad by Exeter Chiefs full-back Phil Dollman, only for Dollman to injure his knee in Exeter's win over Wasps in the English Premiership final on 27 May. The Scarlets' Rhys Patchell was called up to the training squad while Dollman's injury was assessed, before Dollman eventually pulled out on 5 June. Forward James King was injured in the Ospreys' loss to Munster in the Pro12 play-off semi-finals and replaced in the squad by Scarlets flanker Aaron Shingler. Shingler's teammates, props Samson Lee (knee) and Rob Evans (hand), and lock Jake Ball (shoulder), also pulled out due to injury; Ball missed the Pro12 final against Munster due to his injury, while Lee and Evans were injured during the match. Evans was replaced in the squad by Ospreys prop Gareth Thomas, while fellow Osprey Rhodri Jones joined the training squad as Lee's injury was assessed, before finally replacing Lee on 5 June. Four of the Wales squad – Tomas Francis, Kristian Dacey, Cory Hill and Gareth Davies – were called up to play for the Lions midway through the tour.

Name	Position	Club	Notes
Scott Baldwin	Hooker	Ospreys	
Kristian Dacey	Hooker	Cardiff Blues	Called up to British & Irish Lions squad
Ryan Elias	Hooker	Scarlets	
Rob Evans	Prop	Scarlets	Withdrew due to hand injury
Tomas Francis	Prop	Exeter Chiefs	Called up to British & Irish Lions squad
Rhodri Jones	Prop	Ospreys	Injury replacement for Samson Lee
Wyn Jones	Prop	Scarlets	
Samson Lee	Prop	Scarlets	Withdrew due to knee injury
Nicky Smith	Prop	Ospreys	
Gareth Thomas	Prop	Ospreys	Injury replacement for Rob Evans
Jake Ball	Lock	Scarlets	Withdrew due to shoulder injury
Adam Beard	Lock	Ospreys	
Seb Davies	Lock	Cardiff Blues	
Cory Hill	Lock	Newport Gwent Dragons	Called up to British & Irish Lions squad
Rory Thornton	Lock	Ospreys	
Ollie Griffiths	Back row	Newport Gwent Dragons	
Ellis Jenkins	Back row	Cardiff Blues	
James King	Back row	Ospreys	Withdrew due to injury
Josh Navidi	Back row	Cardiff Blues	
Aaron Shingler	Back row	Scarlets	Injury replacement for James King
Thomas Young	Back row	Wasps	
Aled Davies	Scrum-half	Scarlets	
Gareth Davies	Scrum-half	Scarlets	Called up to British & Irish Lions squad
Tomos Williams	Scrum-half	Cardiff Blues	
Gareth Anscombe	Fly-half	Cardiff Blues	
Sam Davies	Fly-half	Ospreys	
Rhys Patchell	Fly-half	Scarlets	Injury replacement for Phil Dollman
Owen Williams	Fly-half	Leicester Tigers	
Tyler Morgan	Centre	Newport Gwent Dragons	
Jamie Roberts	Centre	Harlequins	Captain
Scott Williams	Centre	Scarlets	
Cory Allen	Wing	Cardiff Blues	
Alex Cuthbert	Wing	Cardiff Blues	
Steff Evans	Wing	Scarlets	
Keelan Giles	Wing	Ospreys	
Phil Dollman	Full-back	Exeter Chiefs	Injury replacement for Rhun Williams; withdrew due to knee injury
Rhun Williams	Full-back	Cardiff Blues	Withdrew due to ankle injury

== Matches ==
Wales scheduled a two-test tour for summer 2017, in which they would play against Tonga and Samoa. The second match was scheduled for the Samoan capital, Apia, but the facilities in Tonga led World Rugby to name Auckland, New Zealand, as a contingency venue. Renovations of the Teufaiva Sport Stadium in Nukuʻalofa were expected to be completed in June 2017, but not in time for the Wales game. An assessment of the facilities in Tonga took place in December 2016, but with the pitch not yet in place, the WRU met with World Rugby to further discuss the contingency of moving the fixture to New Zealand. In February 2017, the uncertainty over the readiness of the new stadium meant it was confirmed that the game would not be played in Tonga, and in May 2017, the game was officially moved to Auckland, to be played on 16 June, a day earlier than originally scheduled.

=== RGC 1404 v Wales ===
As part of a six-day training camp in North Wales ahead of the tour, Wales played an uncapped friendly against 2016–17 WRU National Cup winners RGC 1404 at Eirias Stadium in Colwyn Bay. Five uncapped players were named in the starting XV: Adam Beard, Seb Davies, Ollie Griffiths, Aled Davies and Keelan Giles. Wales scored 14 tries, including hat-tricks from Cory Allen and Tyler Morgan, braces from Ellis Jenkins, Alex Cuthbert and Thomas Young, and one each from Jamie Roberts and Gareth Anscombe, to claim an 88–19 win.

2 June 2017

RGC 1404 (Wales)	19–88	Wales XV
Try: Bagshaw 21' m Hughes 31' c Yardley 39' c Con: Botica (2) 32', 40'	Report; Timeline; Squads	Try: Jenkins (2) 4' m, 14' c Allen (3) 8' c, 16' c, 68' m Morgan (3) 18' c, 29' c, 40+2' c Roberts 34' c Cuthbert (2) 41' m, 80' c Anscombe 47' m Young (2) 60' m, 76' c Con: Anscombe (7/9) 9', 15', 17', 20', 30', 35', 40+3'; O. Williams (2/5) 76', 80'

Eirias Stadium, Colwyn Bay
Referee: Ian Davies

Team details

FB	15	Afon Bagshaw	(substituted off) 53'
RW	14	Carwyn ap Myrddin
OC	13	Tom Hughes		(substituted off) 74'
IC	12	Tiaan Loots
LW	11	Rhys Williams
FH	10	Jacob Botica	(substituted off) 51'
SH	9	Efan Jones	(substituted off) 51'	(substituted in) 74'
N8	8	Huw Worthington	(substituted off) 41'
OF	7	Mei Parry
BF	6	Tim Grey
RL	5	Andrew Williams (c)	(substituted off) 55'
LL	4	Sean Lonsdale
TP	3	Sam Wainwright	(substituted off) 51'
HK	2	Evan Yardley	(substituted off) 41'
LP	1	Joe Simpson	(substituted off) 61'
Replacements:
	16	Rhys Williams	(substituted in) 41'
	17	Curtis Reynolds	(substituted in) 61'
	18	Ross Davies	(substituted in) 51'
	19	Robin Williams	(substituted in) 55'
	20	Will Bryan	(substituted in) 41'
	21	Cam Davies	(substituted in) 51'
	22	Billy McBryde	(substituted in) 51'
	23	Dion Jones	(substituted in) 53'
	24	Jordan Scott
	25	George Roberts
	26	Josh Leach
	27	Bryn Edwards
	28	Ianto Pari
	29	Harri Evans
	30	Sam Jones
	31	Richard Hopkins
	32	Tom Seddon
Coach:
(Wales) Mark Jones

FB	32	Gareth Anscombe		(substituted off) 64'
RW	29	Keelan Giles		(substituted off) 41'
OC	27	Tyler Morgan
IC	24	Jamie Roberts (c)		(substituted off) 40'
LW	25	Cory Allen
FH	22	Sam Davies		(substituted off) 41'
SH	21	Aled Davies		(substituted off) 41'
N8	16	Ollie Griffiths		(substituted off) 41'
OF	17	Ellis Jenkins		(substituted off) 58'
BF	14	Seb Davies		(substituted off) 58'
RL	11	Cory Hill		(substituted off) 41'
LL	10	Adam Beard
TP	4	Tomas Francis		(substituted off) 33'
HK	6	Kristian Dacey		(substituted off) 33'
LP	1	Nicky Smith		(substituted off) 33'
Replacements:
PR	2	Dillon Lewis		(substituted in) 33'
PR	3	Wyn Jones		(substituted in) 33'	(substituted off) 66'
PR	5	Rhodri Jones
PR	33	Gareth Thomas			(substituted in) 66'
HK	7	Scott Baldwin			(substituted in) 66'
HK	8	Ryan Elias		(substituted in) 33'	(substituted off) 66'
HK	9	Scott Otten
LK	12	Rory Thornton		(substituted in) 41'
FL	13	Josh Navidi		(substituted in) 41'
FL	15	Aaron Shingler		(substituted in) 58'
FL	18	Thomas Young		(substituted in) 58'
SH	19	Gareth Davies
SH	20	Tomos Williams	(yellow card) 70'	(substituted in) 41'
FH	23	Owen Williams		(substituted in) 40'
CE	26	Scott Williams
WG	28	Alex Cuthbert		(substituted in) 41'
WG	30	Steff Evans		(substituted in) 64'
FB	31	Rhys Patchell		(substituted in) 41'
Coach:
(Wales) Robin McBryde

=== Tonga v Wales ===
Wales' first match on tour was against Tonga, played at Eden Park in Auckland, New Zealand, due to the facilities in Nukuʻalofa not being ready in time for the match. Coach Robin McBryde named three uncapped players in his starting XV – lock Seb Davies, flanker Thomas Young and wing Steff Evans – while a further six were named on the bench. Fly-half Sam Davies opened the scoring with a penalty, before Alex Cuthbert scored the first try of the game midway through the first half, though Davies missed the conversion. Sonatane Takulua responded with a penalty for Tonga, but despite Davies hitting the post with two more kicks, Wales took an 8–3 lead into half-time. Another Takulua penalty three minutes into the second half cut the Tonga deficit to two points, but three more penalties from Sam Davies pushed Wales out to a 17–6 lead before a last-minute penalty try gave them a 24–6 win.

16 June 2017

Tonga	6–24	Wales
Pen: Takulua (2/4) 22', 43'	Report	Try: Cuthbert 18' m Penalty try 79'; Pen: S. Davies (4/6) 2', 51', 67', 77'

Eden Park, Auckland
Attendance: 26,129
Referee: Nick Briant (New Zealand)

FB	15	David Halaifonua
RW	14	Nafi Tuitavake	(substituted off) 70'
OC	13	Siale Piutau (c)
IC	12	Viliami Tahituʻa	(substituted off) 59'
LW	11	Cooper Vuna
FH	10	Latiume Fosita
SH	9	Sonatane Takulua	(substituted off) 77'
N8	8	Valentino Mapapalangi
OF	7	Nili Latu	(substituted off) 74'
BF	6	Daniel Faleafa
RL	5	Steve Mafi
LL	4	Leva Fifita
TP	3	Ben Tameifuna	(substituted off) 56'
HK	2	Paul Ngauamo
LP	1	Latu Talakai	(substituted off) 58'
Replacements:
HK	16	Suliasi Taufalele
PR	17	Sila Puafisi	(substituted in) 56'
PR	18	Phil Kite	(substituted in) 58'
FL	19	Sione Tau
FL	20	Michael Faleafa	(substituted in) 74'
SH	21	Leon Fukofuka	(substituted in) 77'
FH	22	Kali Hala	(substituted in) 59'
WG	23	Kiti Taimani Vaini	(substituted in) 70'
Coach:
(Australia) Toutai Kefu

FB	15	Gareth Anscombe
RW	14	Alex Cuthbert	(substituted off) 40'
OC	13	Scott Williams	(substituted off) 58'	(substituted in) 67'
IC	12	Jamie Roberts (c)
LW	11	Steff Evans
FH	10	Sam Davies
SH	9	Gareth Davies
N8	8	Josh Navidi	(substituted off) 78'
OF	7	Thomas Young	(substituted off) 58'
BF	6	Aaron Shingler
RL	5	Cory Hill
LL	4	Seb Davies
TP	3	Tomas Francis	(substituted off) 78'
HK	2	Kristian Dacey	(substituted off) 58'
LP	1	Nicky Smith	(substituted off) 78'
Replacements:
HK	16	Ryan Elias	(substituted in) 58'
PR	17	Wyn Jones	(substituted in) 78'
PR	18	Dillon Lewis	(substituted in) 78'
FL	19	Ellis Jenkins	(substituted in) 58'
FL	20	Ollie Griffiths	(substituted in) 78'
SH	21	Aled Davies	(substituted in) 70'
FH	22	Owen Williams	(substituted in) 58'	(substituted off) 67'
CE	23	Cory Allen	(substituted in) 40'
Coach:
(Wales) Robin McBryde

Touch judges:
Mike Fraser (New Zealand)
Cam Stone (New Zealand)
Television match official:
Ben Skeen (New Zealand)

=== Samoa v Wales ===
Wales' second and final match on tour saw them face Samoa in Apia. The home side had lost 78–0 to New Zealand the previous week, in the second match of a double-header at Eden Park, following Wales' win over Tonga. With Tomas Francis, Kristian Dacey, Cory Hill and Gareth Davies called up to the British & Irish Lions' squad, and Alex Cuthbert injured in the win over Tonga, coach Robin McBryde was forced into making seven changes from that side. Dillon Lewis, Ryan Elias, Rory Thornton and Aled Davies replaced the Lions call-ups, while Cory Allen replaced Cuthbert; Tyler Morgan came in for centre Scott Williams, while Ellis Jenkins took over from openside flanker Thomas Young in the two unforced changes. Meanwhile, Samoa made six changes from the team that lost to New Zealand.

Ten of the Wales team fell ill before the match, and they went behind early thanks to a try from Alapati Leiua, converted by Tusi Pisi, who also kicked a penalty; in response, Sam Davies kicked three penalties for Wales to ensure they went into half-time only a point down. Steff Evans' try just after the break put Wales into the lead for the first time in the match, but Manu Leiataua's try meant the lead lasted just 10 minutes; however, Evans scored another try – his second in as many international appearances – eight minutes from the end to give Wales a 19–17 win, their first in Samoa for 31 years.

23 June 2017

Samoa	17–19	Wales
Try: Leiua 3' c Leiataua 52'; Con: Pisi (2/2) 4', 53'; Pen: Pisi (1/2) 9'	Report	Try: S. Evans (2) 41' m, 73' m Pen: S. Davies (3/4) 12', 19', 37'

Apia Park, Apia
Attendance: 5,167
Referee: Marius van der Westhuizen (South Africa)

FB	15	D'Angelo Leuila
RW	14	Alapati Leiua
OC	13	Kieron Fonotia
IC	12	Rey Lee-Lo
LW	11	David Lemi (c)	(substituted off) 75'
FH	10	Tusi Pisi
SH	9	Kahn Fotuali'i
N8	8	Alafoti Fa'osiliva	(substituted off) 48'
OF	7	Galu Taufale	(substituted off) 59'
BF	6	Piula Faʻasalele
RL	5	Fa'atiga Lemalu
LL	4	Chris Vui
TP	3	Paul Alo-Emile	(substituted off) 77'
HK	2	Manu Leiataua	(substituted off) 68'
LP	1	Viliamu Afatia	(substituted off) 59'
Replacements:
HK	16	Seilala Lam	(substituted in) 68'
PR	17	Nephi Leatigaga	(substituted in) 59'
PR	18	Bronson Tauakipulu	(substituted in) 77'
FL	19	Faifili Levave	(substituted in) 48'
N8	20	Sanele Vavae Tuilagi	(substituted in) 59'
SH	21	Dwayne Polataivao
CE	22	Henry Taefu
FH	23	Tila Mealoi	(substituted in) 75'
Coach:
(New Zealand) Alama Ieremia

FB	15	Gareth Anscombe
RW	14	Cory Allen
OC	13	Tyler Morgan	(substituted off) 59'
IC	12	Jamie Roberts (c)
LW	11	Steff Evans
FH	10	Sam Davies
SH	9	Aled Davies
N8	8	Josh Navidi
OF	7	Ellis Jenkins
BF	6	Aaron Shingler	(substituted off) 64'
RL	5	Rory Thornton
LL	4	Seb Davies	(substituted off) 48'
TP	3	Dillon Lewis	(substituted off) 64'
HK	2	Ryan Elias	(substituted off) 56'
LP	1	Nicky Smith	(substituted off) 56'
Replacements:
HK	16	Scott Baldwin	(substituted in) 56'
PR	17	Wyn Jones	(substituted in) 56'
PR	18	Rhodri Jones	(substituted in) 64'
LK	19	Adam Beard	(substituted in) 48'
FL	20	Thomas Young	(substituted in) 64'
SH	21	Tomos Williams
FH	22	Owen Williams
CE	23	Scott Williams	(substituted in) 59'
Coach:
(Wales) Robin McBryde

Touch judges:
Mike Fraser (New Zealand)
Rohan Hoffmann (Australia)
