= 2014 Wales rugby union tour of South Africa =

- Coach: Warren Gatland
- Tour captain: Alun Wyn Jones
- Top point scorer: Dan Biggar (24)
- Top try scorer: Alex Cuthbert (3)
- Top test point scorer: Dan Biggar (24)
- Top test try scorer: Alex Cuthbert (2)
Summary
P	W	D	L
Total
3	1	0	2
Test match
2	0	0	2
Opponent
P	W	D	L
South Africa
2	0	0	2

Tour chronology
- ← Japan 2013 New Zealand 2016 →

In June 2014, Wales toured South Africa, playing a 2-test series against the Springboks. In addition to the two Test matches, Wales also played a warm-up uncapped match against domestic club side Eastern Province Kings. The three matches coincided with the June International Window, playing in the second and third week of the window.

Wales entered the test series on the back of 14 consecutive losses to South Africa; the last time Wales won against South Africa was in June 1999, the only time Wales have beaten South Africa. Wales were on 16 consecutive losses to the Southern Hemisphere greats, Australia, New Zealand and South Africa, with the last time they beat a Southern Hemisphere great was in November 2008, and have not won an away match to the Southern Hemisphere greats since 1969.

The 14 consecutive losses to South Africa were extended to 16, while the 16 consecutive losses to the Southern Hemisphere greats were extended to 18 following a 2–0 series defeat. The only win of the tour came in the un-capped match against the Eastern Province Kings, 34–12. During the test series, Wales and South Africa contested the Prince William Cup, which South Africa retained with the series victory. It was the seventh time South Africa won the trophy to Wales' zero.

== Fixtures ==
Date	Venue	Home	Score	Away
10 June 2014	Nelson Mandela Bay Stadium, Port Elizabeth	Eastern Province Kings	12–34	Wales
14 June 2014	Kings Park Stadium, Durban	South Africa	38–16	Wales
21 June 2014	Mbombela Stadium, Nelspruit	South Africa	31–30	Wales

== Matches ==
=== Eastern Province Kings ===
10 June 2014
19:00 SAST (UTC+02)

Eastern Province Kings (South Africa)	12–34	Wales
Try: Soyizwapi 56' m Kerrod 78' c Con: Whitehead (1/2) 79'	Report	Try: Turnbull 9' c Allen 14' c Hook 44' c Cuthbert 46' m Davies 61' m Con: Hook (3/5) 11', 15', 45'; Pen: Hook (1/1) 39'

Nelson Mandela Bay Stadium, Port Elizabeth
Attendance: 11,828
Referee: Lourens van der Merwe (South Africa)

FB	15	Hansie Graaff	(substituted off) 71'
RW	14	Siviwe Soyizwapi
OC	13	Ronnie Cooke
IC	12	Shane Gates	(substituted off) 62'
LW	11	Scott van Breda
FH	10	George Whitehead
SH	9	Kevin Luiters	(substituted off) 53'
N8	8	Paul Schoeman
OF	7	Devin Oosthuizen	(substituted off) 55'
BF	6	Thembelani Bholi
RL	5	Cameron Lindsay
LL	4	Darron Nell (c)	(substituted off) 73'
TP	3	Charl du Plessis	(substituted off) 39'
HK	2	Edgar Marutlulle	(substituted off) 71'
LP	1	Lizo Gqoboka	(substituted off) 55'
Replacements:
HK	16	Albé de Swardt	(substituted in) 71'
PR	17	BG Uys	(substituted in) 55'
PR	18	Simon Kerrod	(substituted in) 39'
LK	19	Steve Cummins	(substituted in) 73'
FL	20	Stefan Willemse	(substituted in) 55'
SH	21	Jaco Grobler	(substituted in) 53'
CE	22	Dwayne Jenner	(substituted in) 62'
FH	23	Ntabeni Dukisa	(substituted in) 71'
Coach:
(New Zealand) Carlos Spencer

FB	15	Matthew Morgan
RW	14	Alex Cuthbert		(substituted off) 55'
OC	13	Cory Allen
IC	12	Steven Shingler
LW	11	Jordan Williams
FH	10	James Hook
SH	9	Rhodri Williams
N8	8	Dan Baker		(substituted off) 23'	(substituted in) 31'
OF	7	Josh Turnbull
BF	6	Dan Lydiate (c)		(substituted off) 58'
RL	5	Ian Evans
LL	4	Jake Ball		(substituted off) 63'
TP	3	Rhodri Jones	(yellow card) 20'			(substituted off) 55'
HK	2	Scott Baldwin		(substituted off) 55'
LP	1	Paul James		(substituted off) 55'
Replacements:
HK	16	Matthew Rees		(substituted in) 55'
PR	17	Aaron Jarvis		(substituted in) 55'
PR	18	Samson Lee		(substituted in) 23'	(substituted off) 31'	(substituted in) 55'
LK	19	Luke Charteris		(substituted in) 63'
FL	20	Aaron Shingler		(substituted in) 58'
SH	21	Gareth Davies		(substituted in) 55'
WG	22	George North
FB	23	Liam Williams
Coach:
(New Zealand) Warren Gatland

Touch judges:
Christie du Preez (South Africa)
Rodney Boneparte (South Africa)
Television match official:
Jason Jaftha (South Africa)

Notes:

- George North was ruled out of the match, as he was still suffering from a virus hours before kick-off. No other player replaced him in the match-day 23.

=== First test ===
14 June 2014
17:00 SAST (UTC+02)

South Africa	38–16	Wales
Try: Habana (2) 6' c, 20' c Vermeulen 15' c Le Roux 37' c Hendricks 51' c Con: Steyn (5/5) 7', 17', 21', 38', 52'; Pen: Steyn (1/1) 44'	Report	Try: Cuthbert 68' c Con: Hook (1/1) 69'; Pen: Biggar (1/1) 40'; Drop: Biggar (2/2) 2', 19'

Kings Park Stadium, Durban
Referee: Romain Poite (France)

FB	15	Willie le Roux	(substituted off) 70'
RW	14	Cornal Hendricks
OC	13	JP Pietersen
IC	12	Jan Serfontein
LW	11	Bryan Habana
FH	10	Morné Steyn	(substituted off) 70'
SH	9	Fourie du Preez
N8	8	Duane Vermeulen
OF	7	Willem Alberts	(substituted off) 58'
BF	6	Francois Louw
RL	5	Victor Matfield (c)
LL	4	Bakkies Botha	(substituted off) 40'
TP	3	Jannie du Plessis	(substituted off) 58'
HK	2	Bismarck du Plessis	(substituted off) 70'
LP	1	Gurthrö Steenkamp	(substituted off) 44'
Replacements:
HK	16	Schalk Brits	(substituted in) 70'
PR	17	Tendai Mtawarira	(substituted in) 44'
PR	18	Coenie Oosthuizen	(substituted in) 58'
LK	19	Lood de Jager	(substituted in) 40'
FL	20	Schalk Burger	(substituted in) 58'
SH	21	Ruan Pienaar		(substituted in) 73'
FH	22	Johan Goosen	(substituted in) 70'	(substituted off) 73'
WG	23	Lwazi Mvovo	(substituted in) 70'
Coach:
(South Africa) Heyneke Meyer

FB	15	Liam Williams		(substituted off) 55'
RW	14	Alex Cuthbert
OC	13	Jonathan Davies
IC	12	Jamie Roberts	(yellow card) 12'
LW	11	George North
FH	10	Dan Biggar		(substituted off) 64'
SH	9	Mike Phillips		(substituted off) 55'
N8	8	Taulupe Faletau
OF	7	Aaron Shingler		(substituted off) 55'
BF	6	Dan Lydiate
RL	5	Alun Wyn Jones (c)
LL	4	Luke Charteris		(substituted off) 55'
TP	3	Adam Jones		(substituted off) 31'
HK	2	Ken Owens		(substituted off) 58'
LP	1	Gethin Jenkins		(substituted off) 58'
Replacements:
HK	16	Matthew Rees		(substituted in) 58'
PR	17	Paul James		(substituted in) 58'
PR	18	Samson Lee		(substituted in) 31'
LK	19	Ian Evans		(substituted in) 55'
FL	20	Josh Turnbull		(substituted in) 55'
SH	21	Gareth Davies		(substituted in) 55'
FH	22	James Hook		(substituted in) 64'
FB	23	Matthew Morgan		(substituted in) 55'
Coach:
(New Zealand) Warren Gatland

Man of the Match:
Willie le Roux (South Africa)

Touch judges:
Steve Walsh (Australia)
Marius Mitrea (Italy)
Television match official:
Vinny Munro (New Zealand)

Notes:

- Cornal Hendricks, Lood de Jager (both South Africa), Gareth Davies and Matthew Morgan (both Wales) made their international debuts.
- Victor Matfield joined John Smit as the most capped South African player with 111 caps.
- Adam Jones played his 100th test match; 95 for Wales and 5 for the British and Irish Lions.

=== Second test ===
21 June 2014
15:00 SAST (UTC+02)

South Africa	31–30	Wales
Try: Penalty try (2) 32' c, 77' c Hendricks 33' c Le Roux 71' c Con: Steyn (4/4) 32', 35', 72', 78'; Pen: Steyn (1/2) 55'	Report	Try: Roberts 18' c Cuthbert 21' c Owens 45' c Con: Biggar (3/3) 19', 22', 45'; Pen: Biggar (3/4) 12', 56', 65'

Mbombela Stadium, Nelspruit
Attendance: 25,424
Referee: Steve Walsh (Australia)

FB	15	Willie le Roux
RW	14	Cornal Hendricks
OC	13	JP Pietersen
IC	12	Jan Serfontein		(substituted off) 74'
LW	11	Bryan Habana
FH	10	Morné Steyn		23' to 29'
SH	9	Fourie du Preez
N8	8	Duane Vermeulen
OF	7	Willem Alberts		(substituted off) 24'
BF	6	Francois Louw
RL	5	Victor Matfield (c)
LL	4	Flip van der Merwe	(yellow card) 57'	45' to 49'
TP	3	Jannie du Plessis		(substituted off) 58'
HK	2	Bismarck du Plessis		(substituted off) 65'
LP	1	Tendai Mtawarira		(substituted off) 65'
Replacements:
HK	16	Schalk Brits		(substituted in) 65'
PR	17	Gurthrö Steenkamp		(substituted in) 65'
PR	18	Coenie Oosthuizen		(substituted in) 58'
LK	19	Lood de Jager		(substituted in) 45'	(substituted off) 49'
FL	20	Schalk Burger		(substituted in) 24'
SH	21	Ruan Pienaar		(substituted in) 23'	(substituted off) 29'
CE	22	Wynand Olivier		(substituted in) 74'
WG	23	Lwazi Mvovo
Coach:
(South Africa) Heyneke Meyer

FB	15	Liam Williams
RW	14	Alex Cuthbert
OC	13	Jonathan Davies
IC	12	Jamie Roberts
LW	11	George North
FH	10	Dan Biggar	(yellow card) 32'
SH	9	Mike Phillips
N8	8	Taulupe Faletau
OF	7	Josh Turnbull
BF	6	Dan Lydiate
RL	5	Alun Wyn Jones (c)
LL	4	Luke Charteris	(yellow card) 29'	(substituted off) 74'
TP	3	Samson Lee		(substituted off) 51'
HK	2	Ken Owens		(substituted off) 74'
LP	1	Gethin Jenkins		(substituted off) 74'
Replacements:
HK	16	Matthew Rees		(substituted in) 74'
PR	17	Paul James		(substituted in) 74'
PR	18	Aaron Jarvis		(substituted in) 51'
LK	19	Jake Ball		(substituted in) 74'
N8	20	Dan Baker
SH	21	Gareth Davies
FH	22	James Hook
FB	23	Matthew Morgan
Coach:
(New Zealand) Warren Gatland

Man of the Match:
Duane Vermeulen (South Africa)

Touch judges:
Romain Poite (France)
Francisco Pastrana (Argentina)
Television match official:
Glenn Newman (New Zealand)

Notes:

- Victor Matfield surpassed John Smit, to become South Arica's most capped player with 112 caps.
- South Africa retain the Prince William Cup for the seventh time.

== Squads ==
=== Wales ===
Before the tour, the Welsh Rugby Union announced that on 30 May, a Wales senior trial match would take place at the Liberty Stadium in Swansea, the first of its kind in 14 years. The failure of the Welsh regions to qualify for the 2013–14 Pro12 play-offs meant that, for many of the players, there would be a five-week gap between the end of the season and the first Test. The teams were announced on 13 May, with the Probables squad to be coached by Rob Howley, and the Possibles squad by Robin McBryde. The match fell outside the international window, so players based outside Wales were not required to be released to play, in accordance with IRB regulations. No players based in England were released for the match, while all the France-based players selected for the match except Dan Lydiate ended up participating.

==== Trial match ====
30 May 2014
19:05 BST (UTC+01)

**Probables**	**55–7**	**Possibles**
Try: J. Williams (2) 2' m, 79 c Biggar 5' c J. Davies (3) 23' c, 25' c, 46' c L. Williams 35' m Baldwin 43' c Con: Biggar (6/8) 6', 24', 26', 44', 47', 80'; Pen: Biggar (1/1) 12'	Report	Try: G. Davies 60' c Con: Hook (1/1) 60'

Liberty Stadium, Swansea
Attendance: 20,032
Referee: Neil Hennessy (Wales)

Team details

FB	15	**Liam Williams**	(substituted off) 48'
RW	14	**Alex Cuthbert**
OC	13	**Jonathan Davies**		(substituted off) 69'
IC	12	**Jamie Roberts**	(substituted off) 37'
LW	11	Jordan Williams
FH	10	**Dan Biggar**
SH	9	**Mike Phillips**	(substituted off) 48'	(substituted in) 69'
N8	8	**Taulupe Faletau**	(substituted off) 53'
OF	7	**Aaron Shingler**
BF	6	**Josh Turnbull**
RL	5	**Alun Wyn Jones** (c)	(substituted off) 48'
LL	4	**Luke Charteris**
TP	3	**Adam Jones**	(substituted off) 48'	(substituted in) 59'
HK	2	**Ken Owens**	(substituted off) 16'
LP	1	**Gethin Jenkins**	(substituted off) 40'
Replacements:
PR	16	**Scott Baldwin**	(substituted in) 16'
HK	17	**Aaron Jarvis**	(substituted in) 40'
PR	18	**Samson Lee**	(substituted in) 48'	(substituted off) 59'
LK	19	Lewis Evans	(substituted in) 48'
FL	20	**Josh Navidi**	(substituted in) 48'
SH	21	**Rhodri Williams**	(substituted in) 48'
FH	22	Sam Davies	(substituted in) 48'
CE	23	Dafydd Hewitt	(substituted in) 37'
Coach:
(Wales) Rob Howley

FB	15	Dan Fish	(substituted off) 40'
RW	14	**Harry Robinson**
OC	13	**Cory Allen**
IC	12	Steven Shingler	(substituted off) 71'
LW	11	Kristian Phillips
FH	10	**James Hook**
SH	9	Gareth Davies	(substituted off) 71'
N8	8	**Dan Baker**	(substituted off) 49'
OF	7	Ellis Jenkins
BF	6	**Andrew Coombs**
RL	5	**Ian Evans**	(substituted off) 40'
LL	4	**Jake Ball**
TP	3	**Rhodri Jones**	(substituted off) 53'
HK	2	**Matthew Rees** (c)	(substituted off) 53'
LP	1	Rob Evans	(substituted off) 40'
Replacements:
HK	16	Kristian Dacey	(substituted in) 53'
PR	17	Owen Evans	(substituted in) 40'
PR	18	**Scott Andrews**	(substituted in) 53'
LK	19	Macauley Cook	(substituted in) 40'
FL	20	James Davies	(substituted in) 49'
SH	21	**Lloyd Williams**	(substituted in) 71'
CE	22	Matthew Morgan	(substituted in) 40'
CE	23	**Jonathan Spratt**	(substituted in) 71'
Coach:
(Wales) Robin McBryde

Man of the Match:
Jonathan Davies (Probables)

Touch judges:
Sean Brickell (Wales)
Greg Morgan (Wales)
Television match official:
Tim Hayes (Wales)

Note: Bold text denotes players who are internationally capped.

==== Touring squad ====
Head coach Warren Gatland named a 32-man squad following the trial match, for the two-test series against South Africa. It included 19 players from the Probables squad, 10 from the Possibles squad and three who did not feature in the trial match.

Head coach: (New Zealand) Warren Gatland

Note: Caps and ages are as of the date of the first test match, 14 June 2014.

Player	Position	Date of birth (age)	Caps	Club/province
Scott Baldwin	Hooker	12 July 1988 (aged 25)	1	(Wales) Ospreys
Ken Owens	Hooker	3 January 1987 (aged 27)	24	(Wales) Scarlets
Matthew Rees	Hooker	9 December 1980 (aged 33)	58	(Wales) Cardiff Blues
Paul James	Prop	13 May 1982 (aged 32)	53	(England) Bath
Aaron Jarvis	Prop	20 May 1986 (aged 28)	3	(Wales) Ospreys
Gethin Jenkins	Prop	17 November 1980 (aged 33)	105	(Wales) Cardiff Blues
Adam Jones	Prop	8 March 1981 (aged 33)	94	(Wales) Ospreys
Rhodri Jones	Prop	23 December 1991 (aged 22)	10	(Wales) Scarlets
Samson Lee	Prop	30 November 1992 (aged 21)	3	(Wales) Scarlets
Jake Ball	Lock	21 June 1991 (aged 22)	4	(Wales) Scarlets
Luke Charteris	Lock	9 March 1983 (aged 31)	46	(France) Perpignan
Ian Evans	Lock	4 October 1984 (aged 29)	32	(Wales) Ospreys
Alun Wyn Jones (c)	Lock	19 September 1985 (aged 28)	78	(Wales) Ospreys
Dan Lydiate	Flanker	18 December 1987 (aged 26)	35	(France) Racing Métro
Aaron Shingler	Flanker	7 August 1987 (aged 26)	7	(Wales) Scarlets
Josh Turnbull	Flanker	12 March 1988 (aged 26)	5	(Wales) Scarlets
Dan Baker	Number 8	5 July 1992 (aged 21)	2	(Wales) Ospreys
Taulupe Faletau	Number 8	12 November 1990 (aged 23)	34	(Wales) Newport Gwent Dragons
Gareth Davies	Scrum-half	18 August 1990 (aged 23)	0	(Wales) Scarlets
Mike Phillips	Scrum-half	29 August 1982 (aged 31)	85	(France) Racing Métro
Rhodri Williams	Scrum-half	5 May 1993 (aged 21)	3	(Wales) Scarlets
Dan Biggar	Fly-half	16 October 1989 (aged 24)	23	(Wales) Ospreys
James Hook	Fly-half	27 June 1985 (aged 28)	75	(France) Perpignan
Cory Allen	Centre	11 February 1993 (aged 21)	1	(Wales) Cardiff Blues
Jonathan Davies	Centre	5 April 1988 (aged 26)	39	(Wales) Scarlets
Jamie Roberts	Centre	8 November 1986 (aged 27)	58	(France) Racing Métro
Steven Shingler	Centre	20 June 1991 (aged 22)	0	(Wales) Scarlets
Alex Cuthbert	Wing	5 April 1990 (aged 24)	24	(Wales) Cardiff Blues
George North	Wing	13 April 1992 (aged 22)	40	(England) Northampton Saints
Jordan Williams	Wing	20 September 1993 (aged 20)	0	(Wales) Scarlets
Matthew Morgan	Fullback	23 April 1991 (aged 23)	0	(Wales) Ospreys
Liam Williams	Fullback	9 April 1991 (aged 23)	12	(Wales) Scarlets

=== South Africa ===
On 31 May, head coach Heyneke Meyer named a 36-man squad for the 2-test series against Wales, and the single test match against Scotland, plus the uncapped match against a World XV side.

On 2 June, Damian de Allende was withdrawn from the squad due to injury. He was replaced by Marnitz Boshoff.

On 8 June, Trevor Nyakane was added to the squad to provide further cover at prop.

Note: Caps and ages are as of the date of the first test match, 14 June 2014.

Player	Position	Date of birth (age)	Caps	Club/province
Schalk Brits	Hooker	16 May 1981 (aged 33)	5	(England) Saracens
Bismarck du Plessis ‡	Hooker	22 May 1984 (aged 30)	57	(South Africa) Sharks
Callie Visagie	Hooker	9 July 1988 (aged 25)	0	(South Africa) Bulls
Jannie du Plessis ‡	Prop	16 November 1982 (aged 31)	51	(South Africa) Sharks
Tendai Mtawarira ‡	Prop	1 August 1985 (aged 28)	53	(South Africa) Sharks
Trevor Nyakane	Prop	4 May 1989 (aged 25)	3	(South Africa) Cheetahs
Coenie Oosthuizen ‡	Prop	22 March 1989 (aged 25)	14	(South Africa) Cheetahs
Gurthrö Steenkamp	Prop	12 June 1981 (aged 33)	49	(France) Toulouse
Marcel van der Merwe	Prop	24 October 1990 (aged 23)	0	(South Africa) Bulls
Bakkies Botha	Lock	22 September 1979 (aged 34)	78	(France) Toulon
Lood de Jager	Lock	17 December 1992 (aged 21)	0	(South Africa) Cheetahs
Victor Matfield (c)	Lock	11 May 1977 (aged 37)	110	(South Africa) Bulls
Flip van der Merwe ‡	Lock	6 June 1985 (aged 29)	34	(South Africa) Bulls
Willem Alberts ‡	Flanker	11 May 1984 (aged 30)	30	(South Africa) Sharks
Schalk Burger	Flanker	13 April 1983 (aged 31)	68	(South Africa) Stormers
Marcell Coetzee ‡	Flanker	8 May 1991 (aged 23)	15	(South Africa) Sharks
Siya Kolisi ‡	Flanker	16 June 1991 (aged 22)	10	(South Africa) Stormers
Francois Louw	Flanker	15 June 1985 (aged 28)	28	(England) Bath
Oupa Mohojé	Flanker	3 August 1990 (aged 23)	0	(South Africa) Cheetahs
Duane Vermeulen ‡	Number 8	3 July 1986 (aged 27)	16	(South Africa) Stormers
Fourie du Preez	Scrum-half	24 March 1982 (aged 32)	67	(Japan) Suntory Sungoliath
Francois Hougaard ‡	Scrum-half	6 April 1988 (aged 26)	27	(South Africa) Bulls
Ruan Pienaar	Scrum-half	10 March 1984 (aged 30)	74	(Republic of Ireland) Ulster
Marnitz Boshoff	Fly-half	11 January 1989 (aged 25)	0	(South Africa) Lions
Johan Goosen	Fly-half	27 July 1992 (aged 21)	4	(South Africa) Cheetahs
François Steyn ‡	Fly-half	14 May 1987 (aged 27)	53	(South Africa) Sharks
Morné Steyn	Fly-half	11 July 1984 (aged 29)	54	(France) Stade Français
Damian de Allende	Centre	25 November 1991 (aged 22)	0	(South Africa) Stormers
Juan de Jongh	Centre	15 April 1988 (aged 26)	14	(South Africa) Stormers
JJ Engelbrecht ‡	Centre	22 February 1989 (aged 25)	12	(South Africa) Bulls
Jan Serfontein	Centre	15 April 1993 (aged 21)	9	(South Africa) Bulls
Bryan Habana	Wing	12 June 1983 (aged 31)	95	(France) Toulon
Cornal Hendricks	Wing	18 April 1988 (aged 26)	0	(South Africa) Cheetahs
Lwazi Mvovo	Wing	3 June 1986 (aged 28)	7	(South Africa) Sharks
JP Pietersen	Wing	12 July 1986 (aged 27)	51	(South Africa) Sharks
S'bura Sithole	Wing	14 June 1990 (aged 24)	0	(South Africa) Sharks
Zane Kirchner	Fullback	16 June 1984 (aged 29)	28	(Republic of Ireland) Leinster
Willie le Roux ‡	Fullback	18 August 1989 (aged 24)	12	(South Africa) Cheetahs

The following players were considered for selection, but not chosen due to injury or suspension.

Player	Position	Date of birth (age)	Caps	Club/province
Adriaan Strauss ‡	Hooker	18 November 1985 (aged 28)	33	(South Africa) Cheetahs
Eben Etzebeth ‡	Lock	29 October 1991 (aged 22)	23	(South Africa) Stormers
Juan Smith	Flanker	30 July 1981 (aged 32)	69	(France) Toulon
Patrick Lambie ‡	Fly-half	17 October 1990 (aged 23)	32	(South Africa) Sharks
Jaque Fourie	Centre	4 March 1983 (aged 31)	72	(Japan) Kobelco Steelers
Jean de Villiers ‡	Centre	24 February 1981 (aged 33)	96	(South Africa) Stormers

Note: ‡ denotes players who are centrally contracted to the South African Rugby Union.

== South African warm-up match ==
On 7 June, South Africa played an uncapped warm-up match against a World XV in Cape Town, in the lead up to the Welsh series.

7 June 2014
17:00 SAST (UTC+02)

South Africa	47–13	World XV
Try: Habana 16' m Botha 32' c B. Du Plessis (2) 48' m, 58' c Goosen 77' c Le Roux 79' c Con: M. Steyn (2/4) 33', 59'; Goosen (2/2) 78', 79'; Pen: M. Steyn (3/3) 16', 30', 44'	Report	Try: Hargreaves 5' c Con: O'Connor (1/1) 5'; Pen: O'Connor (2/2) 23', 40'

Newlands, Cape Town
Attendance: 31,500
Referee: George Clancy (Ireland)

Team details

FB	15	Willie le Roux
RW	14	Cornal Hendricks
OC	13	JP Pietersen
IC	12	François Steyn
LW	11	Bryan Habana	(substituted off) 68'
FH	10	Morné Steyn	(substituted off) 68'
SH	9	Ruan Pienaar	(substituted off) 50'
N8	8	Duane Vermeulen
OF	7	Willem Alberts	(substituted off) 59'
BF	6	Francois Louw
RL	5	Victor Matfield (c)
LL	4	Bakkies Botha	(substituted off) 50'
TP	3	Jannie du Plessis	(substituted off) 64'
HK	2	Bismarck du Plessis	(substituted off) 59'
LP	1	Tendai Mtawarira	(substituted off) 64'
Replacements:
HK	16	Schalk Brits	(substituted in) 59'
PR	17	Gurthrö Steenkamp	(substituted in) 64'
PR	18	Coenie Oosthuizen	(substituted in) 64'
LK	19	Flip van der Merwe	(substituted in) 50'
FL	20	Schalk Burger	(substituted in) 59'
SH	21	Fourie du Preez	(substituted in) 50'
FH	22	Johan Goosen	(substituted in) 68'
WG	23	Lwazi Mvovo	(substituted in) 68'
Coach:
(South Africa) Heyneke Meyer

FB	15	(Australia) James O'Connor
RW	14	(Australia) Drew Mitchell		(substituted off) 61'
OC	13	(New Zealand) Rene Ranger
IC	12	(South Africa) Wynand Olivier
LW	11	(New Zealand) Hosea Gear
FH	10	(Australia) Matt Giteau (c)		(substituted off) 58'
SH	9	(South Africa) Rory Kockott		(substituted off) 64'
N8	8	(Ireland) Roger Wilson
OF	7	(England) Steffon Armitage		(substituted off) 61'
BF	6	(Georgia (country)) Mamuka Gorgodze	(yellow card) 47'
RL	5	(South Africa) Alistair Hargreaves
LL	4	(South Africa) Juandré Kruger		(substituted off) 40'
TP	3	(New Zealand) Carl Hayman		(substituted off) 57'
HK	2	(South Africa) Craig Burden		(substituted off) 47'
LP	1	(Tonga) Sona Taumalolo		(substituted off) 54'
Replacements:
HK	16	(New Zealand) Andrew Hore		(substituted in) 47'
PR	17	(South Africa) Schalk Ferreira		(substituted in) 54'
PR	18	(South Africa) Pat Cilliers		(substituted in) 54'
LK	19	(Samoa) Joe Tekori		(substituted in) 40'
FL	20	(France) Alexandre Lapandry		(substituted in) 61'
SH	21	(New Zealand) Jimmy Cowan	(yellow card) 73'	(substituted in) 64'
FH	22	(France) François Trinh-Duc		(substituted in) 58'
CE	23	(New Zealand) Benson Stanley		(substituted in) 61'
Coach:
(South Africa) Nick Mallett

Man of the Match:
Bakkies Botha (South Africa)

Touch judges:
Lourens van der Merwe (South Africa)
Quinton Immelman (South Africa)
Television match official:
Deon van Blommestein (South Africa)
