= 2016 Wales rugby union tour of New Zealand =

- Coach: Warren Gatland
- Tour captain: Sam Warburton
- Top point scorer: Beauden Barrett (37)
- Top try scorer: Beauden Barrett (3)
- Top test point scorer: Beauden Barrett (37)
- Top test try scorer: Beauden Barrett/Waisake Naholo (3)
Summary
P	W	D	L
Total
4	0	0	4
Test match
3	0	0	3
Opponent
P	W	D	L
New Zealand
3	0	0	3

Tour chronology
- ← South Africa 2014 Pacific Islands 2017 →

The 2016 Wales rugby union tour of New Zealand was a rugby union tour of New Zealand by the Wales national team in June 2016. The tour saw the Welsh side play four matches: three test matches against New Zealand and one match against the Chiefs of Super Rugby.

In the history of matches between these two sides until this three-match test series, New Zealand has won 90% (27 matches) of encounters between them, with Wales' 10% (3 matches) all having occurred before 1954.

== Fixtures ==
In addition to their three tests against New Zealand, Wales played a mid-week match against the Chiefs provincial side.

Date	Venue	Home	Score	Away
11 June 2016	Eden Park, Auckland	New Zealand	39–21	Wales
14 June 2016	Waikato Stadium, Hamilton	Chiefs	40–7	Wales
18 June 2016	Wellington Regional Stadium, Wellington	New Zealand	36–22	Wales
25 June 2016	Forsyth Barr Stadium, Dunedin	New Zealand	46–6	Wales

== Squads ==
Note: Ages, caps and clubs are as per 18 June, the first test match of the tour.

=== Wales ===
On 10 May, Warren Gatland named a 35-man squad for their June 3-test series against New Zealand, pre-tour test against England and the mid week match against the Chiefs.

On 29 May, after injury to Dan Lydiate in the England warm-up match, Ellis Jenkins was called up to the squad to replace Lydiate.

On 7 June, Aaron Jarvis was called up to the squad as injury cover for Paul James. Jarvis later became a permanent replacement after James failed to recover from his injury.

On 11 June, Aled Davies joined the squad as an injury replacement for Lloyd Williams.

Following the first test, Keelan Giles and Rhys Patchell were called up to the squad as injury cover.

Coaching team:

- Head coach: (New Zealand) Warren Gatland
- Backs/attack coach: (Wales) Rob Howley
- Forwards coach: (Wales) Robin McBryde
- Defence coach: (England) Shaun Edwards

Player	Position	Date of birth (age)	Caps	Club/province
Scott Baldwin ‡	Hooker	12 July 1988 (aged 27)	21	(Wales) Ospreys
Kristian Dacey	Hooker	25 July 1989 (aged 26)	3	(Wales) Cardiff Blues
Ken Owens	Hooker	3 January 1987 (aged 29)	39	(Wales) Scarlets
Rob Evans	Prop	14 April 1992 (aged 24)	9	(Wales) Scarlets
Tomas Francis	Prop	27 April 1992 (aged 24)	11	(England) Exeter Chiefs
Paul James	Prop	13 May 1982 (aged 34)	66	(Wales) Ospreys
Aaron Jarvis	Prop	20 May 1986 (aged 30)	17	(Wales) Ospreys
Gethin Jenkins	Prop	17 November 1980 (aged 35)	124	(Wales) Cardiff Blues
Rhodri Jones ‡	Prop	23 December 1991 (aged 24)	14	(Wales) Scarlets
Samson Lee ‡	Prop	30 November 1992 (aged 23)	23	(Wales) Scarlets
Jake Ball ‡	Lock	21 June 1991 (aged 24)	18	(Wales) Scarlets
Luke Charteris	Lock	9 March 1983 (aged 33)	66	(France) Racing 92
Bradley Davies	Lock	9 January 1987 (aged 29)	54	(England) Wasps
Alun Wyn Jones ‡	Lock	19 September 1985 (aged 30)	99	(Wales) Ospreys
Ellis Jenkins	Flanker	29 April 1993 (aged 23)	0	(Wales) Cardiff Blues
James King ‡	Flanker	24 July 1990 (aged 25)	8	(Wales) Ospreys
Dan Lydiate ‡	Flanker	18 December 1987 (aged 28)	57	(Wales) Ospreys
Ross Moriarty	Flanker	18 April 1994 (aged 22)	6	(England) Gloucester
Josh Turnbull	Flanker	12 March 1988 (aged 28)	8	(Wales) Cardiff Blues
Sam Warburton (c) ‡	Flanker	5 October 1988 (aged 27)	64	(Wales) Cardiff Blues
Taulupe Faletau	Number 8	12 November 1990 (aged 25)	58	(Wales) Newport Gwent Dragons
Aled Davies	Scrum-half	19 July 1992 (aged 23)	0	(Wales) Scarlets
Gareth Davies	Scrum-half	18 August 1990 (aged 25)	14	(Wales) Scarlets
Rhys Webb ‡	Scrum-half	9 December 1988 (aged 27)	19	(Wales) Ospreys
Lloyd Williams	Scrum-half	30 November 1989 (aged 26)	27	(Wales) Cardiff Blues
Gareth Anscombe ‡	Fly-half	10 May 1991 (aged 25)	7	(Wales) Cardiff Blues
Dan Biggar ‡	Fly-half	16 October 1989 (aged 26)	45	(Wales) Ospreys
Rhys Patchell	Fly-half	17 May 1993 (aged 23)	2	(Wales) Cardiff Blues
Rhys Priestland	Fly-half	9 January 1987 (aged 29)	46	(England) Bath
Jonathan Davies	Centre	5 April 1988 (aged 28)	53	(France) Clermont
Tyler Morgan ‡	Centre	11 September 1995 (aged 20)	3	(Wales) Newport Gwent Dragons
Jamie Roberts	Centre	8 November 1986 (aged 29)	80	(England) Harlequins
Scott Williams ‡	Centre	10 October 1990 (aged 25)	35	(Wales) Scarlets
Hallam Amos	Wing	24 September 1994 (aged 21)	7	(Wales) Newport Gwent Dragons
Keelan Giles	Wing	29 January 1998 (aged 18)	0	(Wales) Ospreys
Tom James	Wing	17 April 1987 (aged 29)	12	(Wales) Cardiff Blues
George North	Wing	13 April 1992 (aged 24)	61	(England) Northampton Saints
Eli Walker	Wing	28 March 1992 (aged 24)	1	(Wales) Ospreys
Matthew Morgan	Fullback	23 April 1992 (aged 24)	5	(England) Bristol
Liam Williams	Fullback	9 April 1991 (aged 25)	32	(Wales) Scarlets

‡ – Denotes dual contracted players.

=== New Zealand ===
New Zealand's 32-man squad for the 2016 June international test series against Wales. Tom Franklin and TJ Perenara are also included as temporary injury cover for Sam Whitelock and Tawera Kerr-Barlow.

On 31 May 2016, George Moala was called up to the squad as an injury replacement for Charlie Ngatai.

Coaching team:

- Head coach: (New Zealand) Steve Hansen
- Attack coach: (New Zealand) Ian Foster
- Forwards coach: (New Zealand) Mike Cron
- Defence coach: (New Zealand) Wayne Smith

Player	Position	Date of birth (age)	Caps	Franchise/province
Dane Coles	Hooker	10 December 1986 (aged 29)	36	Hurricanes / Wellington
Nathan Harris	Hooker	8 March 1992 (aged 24)	2	Chiefs / Bay of Plenty
Codie Taylor	Hooker	31 March 1991 (aged 25)	4	Crusaders / Canterbury
Wyatt Crockett	Prop	24 January 1983 (aged 33)	45	Crusaders / Canterbury
Charlie Faumuina	Prop	24 December 1986 (aged 29)	33	Blues / Auckland
Owen Franks	Prop	23 December 1987 (aged 28)	78	Crusaders / Canterbury
Joe Moody	Prop	18 September 1988 (aged 27)	11	Crusaders / Canterbury
Ofa Tu'ungafasi	Prop	19 April 1992 (aged 24)	0	Blues / Auckland
Tom Franklin	Lock	11 August 1990 (aged 25)	0	Highlanders / Otago
Brodie Retallick	Lock	31 May 1991 (aged 25)	47	Chiefs / Hawke's Bay
Luke Romano	Lock	16 February 1986 (aged 30)	22	Crusaders / Canterbury
Patrick Tuipulotu	Lock	23 January 1993 (aged 23)	7	Blues / Auckland
Sam Whitelock	Lock	12 October 1988 (aged 27)	73	Crusaders / Canterbury
Sam Cane	Flanker	13 January 1992 (age 34)	31	Chiefs / Bay of Plenty
Jerome Kaino	Flanker	6 April 1983 (aged 33)	67	Blues / Auckland
Ardie Savea	Flanker	14 October 1993 (aged 22)	0	Hurricanes / Wellington
Liam Squire	Flanker	20 March 1991 (aged 25)	0	Highlanders / Tasman
Elliot Dixon	Number 8	4 September 1989 (aged 26)	0	Highlanders / Southland
Kieran Read (c)	Number 8	26 October 1985 (aged 30)	84	Crusaders / Canterbury
Tawera Kerr-Barlow	Half-back	15 August 1990 (aged 25)	20	Chiefs / Waikato
TJ Perenara	Half-back	23 January 1992 (aged 24)	17	Hurricanes / Wellington
Aaron Smith	Half-back	21 November 1988 (aged 27)	47	Highlanders / Manawatu
Beauden Barrett	First five-eighth	27 May 1991 (aged 25)	36	Hurricanes / Taranaki
Aaron Cruden	First five-eighth	8 January 1989 (aged 27)	37	Chiefs / Manawatu
Lima Sopoaga	First five-eighth	3 February 1991 (aged 25)	1	Highlanders / Southland
Ryan Crotty	Centre	23 September 1988 (aged 27)	15	Crusaders / Canterbury
Malakai Fekitoa	Centre	10 May 1992 (aged 24)	13	Highlanders / Auckland
Charlie Ngatai	Centre	17 August 1990 (aged 25)	1	Chiefs / Taranaki
Seta Tamanivalu	Centre	23 July 1992 (aged 23)	0	Chiefs / Taranaki
George Moala	Wing	5 November 1990 (aged 25)	1	Blues / Auckland
Waisake Naholo	Wing	8 May 1991 (aged 25)	3	Highlanders / Taranaki
Julian Savea	Wing	7 August 1990 (aged 25)	41	Hurricanes / Wellington
Ben Smith	Wing	1 June 1986 (aged 30)	48	Highlanders / Otago
Israel Dagg	Fullback	6 June 1988 (aged 28)	49	Crusaders / Hawke's Bay
Damian McKenzie	Fullback	20 April 1995 (aged 21)	0	Chiefs / Waikato

== Matches ==
=== Old Mutual Wealth Cup ===
29 May 2016
15:00 BST (UTC+01)

England	27–13	Wales
Try: Burrell 19' m Watson 32' m Youngs 43' m Clifford 46' c Yarde 60' m Con: Ford (1/5) 47'	Report	Try: Evans 5' c Con: Biggar (1/1) 6'; Pen: Biggar (2/2) 13', 27'

Twickenham Stadium, London
Attendance: 81,128
Referee: Marius Mitrea (Italy)

FB	15	Mike Brown
RW	14	Anthony Watson
OC	13	Jonathan Joseph	(substituted off) 65'
IC	12	Luther Burrell
LW	11	Marland Yarde
FH	10	George Ford	(substituted off) 75'
SH	9	Ben Youngs	(substituted off) 55'
N8	8	Jack Clifford
OF	7	James Haskell	(substituted off) 62'
BF	6	Teimana Harrison
RL	5	Courtney Lawes	(substituted off) 62'
LL	4	Joe Launchbury
TP	3	Dan Cole	(substituted off) 68'
HK	2	Dylan Hartley (c)	(substituted off) 76'
LP	1	Matt Mullan	(substituted off) 65'
Replacements:
HK	16	Tommy Taylor	(substituted on) 76'
PR	17	Ellis Genge	(substituted on) 65'
PR	18	Paul Hill	(substituted on) 68'
LK	19	Dave Attwood	(substituted on) 62'
FL	20	Matt Kvesic	(substituted on) 62'
SH	21	Danny Care	(substituted on) 55'
FH	22	Ollie Devoto	(substituted on) 75'
CE	23	Elliot Daly	(substituted on) 65'
Coach:
(Australia) Eddie Jones

FB	15	Liam Williams
RW	14	George North
OC	13	Scott Williams	(substituted off) 55'
IC	12	Jamie Roberts
LW	11	Hallam Amos
FH	10	Dan Biggar	(substituted off) 55'
SH	9	Rhys Webb	(substituted off) 65'
N8	8	Taulupe Faletau
OF	7	Dan Lydiate (c)	(substituted off) 23'
BF	6	Ross Moriarty
RL	5	Alun Wyn Jones	(substituted off) 57'
LL	4	Jake Ball
TP	3	Samson Lee	(substituted off) 62'
HK	2	Scott Baldwin	(substituted off) 55'
LP	1	Rob Evans	(substituted off) 55'
Replacements:
HK	16	Kristian Dacey	(substituted on) 55'
PR	17	Gethin Jenkins	(substituted on) 55'
PR	18	Rhodri Jones	(substituted on) 62'
FL	19	Josh Turnbull	(substituted on) 57'
FL	20	James King	(substituted on) 23'
SH	21	Lloyd Williams	(substituted on) 65'
FH	22	Rhys Priestland	(substituted on) 55'
FH	23	Gareth Anscombe	(substituted on) 55'
Coach:
(New Zealand) Warren Gatland

Man of the Match:
Joe Launchbury (England)

Touch judges:
John Lacey (Ireland)
George Clancy (Ireland)
Television match official:
Simon McDowell (Australia)

Notes:

- Ollie Devoto, Ellis Genge, Teimana Harrison and Tommy Taylor (all England) made their international debuts.

=== First Test ===
11 June 2016
19:35 NZST (UTC+12)

New Zealand	39–21	Wales
Try: Savea 15' m Naholo (2) 18' c, 62' c Read 68' c Harris 80' c Con: Cruden (4/5) 19', 63', 69', 80'; Pen: Cruden (2/4) 5', 48'	Report	Try: Faletau 9' m Webb 31' c Con: Biggar (1/2) 32'; Pen: Biggar (3/4) 21', 26', 53'

Eden Park, Auckland
Attendance: 46,270
Referee: Wayne Barnes (England)

FB	15	Ben Smith
RW	14	Waisake Naholo
OC	13	Malakai Fekitoa	(substituted off) 75'
IC	12	Ryan Crotty
LW	11	Julian Savea	(substituted off) 43'
FH	10	Aaron Cruden
SH	9	Aaron Smith	(substituted off) 69'
N8	8	Kieran Read (c)
OF	7	Sam Cane	(substituted off) 60'
BF	6	Jerome Kaino
RL	5	Brodie Retallick
LL	4	Luke Romano	(substituted off) 53'
TP	3	Owen Franks	(substituted off) 46'
HK	2	Dane Coles	(substituted off) 72'
LP	1	Joe Moody	(substituted off) 48'
Replacements:
HK	16	Nathan Harris	(substituted on) 72'
PR	17	Wyatt Crockett	(substituted on) 48'
PR	18	Charlie Faumuina	(substituted on) 46'
LK	19	Patrick Tuipulotu	(substituted on) 53'
FL	20	Ardie Savea	(substituted on) 60'
SH	21	TJ Perenara	(substituted on) 69'
FH	22	Beauden Barrett	(substituted on) 43'
CE	23	Seta Tamanivalu	(substituted on) 75'
Coach:
(New Zealand) Steve Hansen

FB	15	Liam Williams	(substituted off) 65'
RW	14	George North	(substituted off) 78'
OC	13	Jonathan Davies
IC	12	Jamie Roberts	(substituted off) 65'
LW	11	Hallam Amos
FH	10	Dan Biggar
SH	9	Rhys Webb	(substituted off) 72'
N8	8	Taulupe Faletau
OF	7	Sam Warburton (c)	(substituted off) 72'
BF	6	Ross Moriarty
RL	5	Alun Wyn Jones	(substituted off) 45'	(substituted on) 51'
LL	4	Bradley Davies			(substituted off) 72'
TP	3	Samson Lee	(substituted off) 72'
HK	2	Ken Owens	(substituted off) 65'
LP	1	Gethin Jenkins	(substituted off) 65'
Replacements:
HK	16	Scott Baldwin	(substituted on) 65'
PR	17	Rob Evans	(substituted on) 65'
PR	18	Tomas Francis	(substituted on) 72'
LK	19	Jake Ball	(substituted on) 45'	(substituted off) 51'	(substituted on) 72'
FL	20	Ellis Jenkins	(substituted on) 72'
SH	21	Gareth Davies	(substituted on) 72'
FH	22	Gareth Anscombe	(substituted on) 65'
CE	23	Scott Williams	(substituted on) 65'
Coach:
(New Zealand) Warren Gatland

Man of the Match:
Ben Smith (New Zealand)

Touch judges:
Jaco Peyper (South Africa)
Will Houston (Australia)
Television match official:
George Ayoub (Australia)

Notes:

- Alun Wyn Jones became the fifth Welsh player to earn their 100th cap.
- Ardie Savea and Seta Tamanivalu (both New Zealand) and Ellis Jenkins (Wales) made their international debuts.
- There was no replacement issued for George North when he was taken off injured at the end of the game, Wales played with 14 players.

=== Chiefs ===
14 June 2016
18:35 NZST (UTC+12)

Chiefs (New Zealand)	40–7	Wales
Try: Weber 7' c Sanders 31' c Bird 37' c Lowe 66' c Pulu 74' m McNicol 77' c Con: Donald (4/4) 7', 32', 39', 67'; Lowe (1/2) 78'	Report	Try: Dacey 55' c Con: Priestland (1/1) 56'

Waikato Stadium, Hamilton
Attendance: 17,756
Referee: Mike Fraser (New Zealand)

FB	15	(New Zealand) James Lowe
RW	14	(Niue) Toni Pulu
OC	13	(New Zealand) Anton Lienert-Brown
IC	12	(New Zealand) Andrew Horrell
LW	11	(New Zealand) Sam Vaka	(substituted off) 49'
FH	10	(New Zealand) Stephen Donald (c)	(substituted off) 68'
SH	9	(New Zealand) Brad Weber	(substituted off) 71'
N8	8	(New Zealand) Tom Sanders	(substituted off) 61'
OF	7	(New Zealand) Lachlan Boshier
BF	6	(New Zealand) Mitchell Brown
RL	5	(New Zealand) Michael Allardice	(substituted off) 26'
LL	4	(New Zealand) Dominic Bird
TP	3	(Japan) Hiroshi Yamashita	(substituted off) 49'
HK	2	(New Zealand) Rhys Marshall	(substituted off) 40'
LP	1	(New Zealand) Mitchell Graham	(substituted off) 14'
Replacements:
HK	16	(New Zealand) Hika Elliot	(substituted on) 40'
PR	17	(Tonga) Siegfried Fisiihoi	(substituted on) 14'
PR	18	(New Zealand) Atunaisa Moli	(substituted on) 49'
FL	19	(New Zealand) Taleni Seu	(substituted on) 26'
FL	20	(New Zealand) Tevita Koloamatangi	(substituted on) 61'
SH	21	(New Zealand) Kayne Hammington	(substituted on) 71'
FH	22	(New Zealand) Sam McNicol	(substituted on) 49'
WG	23	(Tonga) Latu Vaeno	(substituted on) 68'
Coach:
(New Zealand) Dave Rennie

FB	15	Matthew Morgan
RW	14	Eli Walker
OC	13	Tyler Morgan	(substituted off) 55'
IC	12	Scott Williams	(substituted off) 61'
LW	11	Tom James
FH	10	Rhys Priestland
SH	9	Gareth Davies	(substituted off) 56'
N8	8	James King
OF	7	Sam Warburton	(substituted off) 45'
BF	6	Josh Turnbull
RL	5	Luke Charteris (c)
LL	4	Jake Ball	(substituted off) 49'
TP	3	Tomas Francis	(substituted off) 56'
HK	2	Scott Baldwin	(substituted off) 49'
LP	1	Rob Evans	(substituted off) 49'
Replacements:
HK	16	Kristian Dacey	(substituted on) 49'
PR	17	Aaron Jarvis	(substituted on) 49'
PR	18	Rhodri Jones	(substituted on) 56'
LK	19	Bradley Davies	(substituted on) 49'
N8	20	Taulupe Faletau	(substituted on) 45'
SH	21	Aled Davies	(substituted on) 56'
CE	22	Jamie Roberts	(substituted on) 55'
FH	23	Rhys Patchell	(substituted on) 61'
Coach:
(New Zealand) Warren Gatland

Man of the Match:
Stephen Donald (Chiefs)

Touch judges:
Nick Briant (New Zealand)
Jamie Nutbrown (New Zealand)
Television match official:
Shane McDermott (New Zealand)

Notes:

- Ellis Jenkins was named to start, but was withdrawn from the team after failing to recover from injury and was replaced with Sam Warburton.
- Bench players Gareth Anscombe and Ross Moriarty was pulled out of the team moments before kick-off due to injury and replaced by Taulupe Faletau and Jamie Roberts.

=== Second Test ===
18 June 2016
19:35 NZST (UTC+12)

New Zealand	36–22	Wales
Try: Dagg 20' c B. Smith 51' c Barrett 55' c Naholo 60' m Savea 65' c Con: Cruden (1/1) 22'; Barrett (3/4) 52', 55', 66'; Pen: Cruden (1/1) 30'	Report	Try: A. W. Jones 40' c L. Williams 73' c J. Davies 76' m Con: Biggar (2/2) 40', 74'; Pen: Biggar (1/1) 17'

Wellington Regional Stadium, Wellington
Attendance: 35,907
Referee: Jaco Peyper (South Africa)

FB	15	Israel Dagg
RW	14	Ben Smith
OC	13	Malakai Fekitoa	2' to 15'		(substituted off) 40'
IC	12	Ryan Crotty
LW	11	Waisake Naholo
FH	10	Aaron Cruden	(substituted off) 33'
SH	9	Aaron Smith	(substituted off) 64'
N8	8	Kieran Read (c)
OF	7	Sam Cane	(substituted off) 57'
BF	6	Jerome Kaino
RL	5	Sam Whitelock
LL	4	Brodie Retallick	(substituted off) 67'
TP	3	Owen Franks	(substituted off) 46'
HK	2	Dane Coles	(substituted off) 75'
LP	1	Joe Moody	(substituted off) 54'
Replacements:
HK	16	Nathan Harris	(substituted on) 75'
PR	17	Wyatt Crockett	(substituted on) 54'
PR	18	Charlie Faumuina	(substituted on) 46'
LK	19	Patrick Tuipulotu	(substituted on) 67'
FL	20	Ardie Savea	(substituted on) 57'
SH	21	TJ Perenara	(substituted on) 64'
FH	22	Beauden Barrett	(substituted on) 33'
CE	23	Seta Tamanivalu	(substituted on) 2'	(substituted off) 15'	(substituted on) 40'
Coach:
(New Zealand) Steve Hansen

FB	15	Rhys Patchell
RW	14	Liam Williams
OC	13	Jonathan Davies
IC	12	Jamie Roberts	(substituted off) 77'
LW	11	Hallam Amos
FH	10	Dan Biggar	(substituted off) 75'
SH	9	Rhys Webb	(substituted off) 77'
N8	8	Taulupe Faletau
OF	7	Sam Warburton (c)	(substituted off) 75'
BF	6	Ross Moriarty
RL	5	Alun Wyn Jones
LL	4	Luke Charteris	(substituted off) 61'
TP	3	Samson Lee	(substituted off) 61'
HK	2	Ken Owens	(substituted off) 61'
LP	1	Gethin Jenkins	24' to 31'		(substituted off) 59'
Replacements:
HK	16	Scott Baldwin	(substituted on) 61'
PR	17	Rob Evans	(substituted on) 24'	(substituted off) 31'	(substituted on) 59'
PR	18	Tomas Francis	(substituted on) 61'
LK	19	Bradley Davies	(substituted on) 61'
FL	20	Ellis Jenkins	(substituted on) 75'
SH	21	Gareth Davies	(substituted on) 77'
FH	22	Rhys Priestland	(substituted on) 75'
CE	23	Scott Williams	(substituted on) 77'
Coach:
(New Zealand) Warren Gatland

Man of the Match:
Israel Dagg (New Zealand)

Touch judges:
Jérôme Garcès (France)
Wayne Barnes (England)
Television match official:
George Ayoub (Australia)

Notes:

- Israel Dagg and Ben Smith (New Zealand) earned their 50th test cap.

=== Third Test ===
25 June 2016
19:35 NZST (UTC+12)

New Zealand	46–6	Wales
Try: B. Smith 23' m Moala 34' c Barrett (2) 44' c, 56' c Coles 62' c Dagg 80' c Con: Barrett (5/6) 35', 45', 58', 63', 80'; Pen: Barrett (2/2) 16', 27'	Report	Pen: Biggar (2/2) 6', 18'

Forsyth Barr Stadium, Dunedin
Attendance: 28,726
Referee: Jérôme Garcès (France)

FB	15	Israel Dagg
RW	14	Ben Smith
OC	13	George Moala		(substituted off) 48'
IC	12	Ryan Crotty		(substituted off) 55'
LW	11	Julian Savea
FH	10	Beauden Barrett
SH	9	Aaron Smith		(substituted off) 71'
N8	8	Kieran Read (c)
OF	7	Sam Cane	(yellow card) 46'
BF	6	Elliot Dixon		(substituted off) 55'
RL	5	Sam Whitelock
LL	4	Brodie Retallick		(substituted off) 65'
TP	3	Charlie Faumuina		(substituted off) 53'
HK	2	Dane Coles		(substituted off) 71'
LP	1	Joe Moody		(substituted off) 53'
Replacements:
HK	16	Codie Taylor		(substituted on) 71'
PR	17	Wyatt Crockett		(substituted on) 53'
PR	18	Ofa Tu'ungafasi		(substituted on) 53'
LK	19	Luke Romano		(substituted on) 65'
FL	20	Liam Squire		(substituted on) 55'
SH	21	Tawera Kerr-Barlow		(substituted on) 71'
FH	22	Lima Sopoaga		(substituted on) 55'
WG	23	Waisake Naholo		(substituted on) 48'
Coach:
(New Zealand) Steve Hansen

FB	15	Rhys Patchell
RW	14	Liam Williams	31' to 38'
OC	13	Jonathan Davies
IC	12	Jamie Roberts			(substituted off) 54'
LW	11	Hallam Amos
FH	10	Dan Biggar	(substituted off) 59'
SH	9	Rhys Webb	(substituted off) 55'
N8	8	Taulupe Faletau
OF	7	Sam Warburton (c)	(substituted off) 70'
BF	6	Ross Moriarty
RL	5	Alun Wyn Jones
LL	4	Luke Charteris	(substituted off) 59'
TP	3	Tomas Francis	(substituted off) 47'
HK	2	Ken Owens	(substituted off) 57'
LP	1	Rob Evans	(substituted off) 47'
Replacements:
HK	16	Scott Baldwin	(substituted on) 57'
PR	17	Aaron Jarvis	(substituted on) 47'
PR	18	Samson Lee	(substituted on) 47'
LK	19	Jake Ball	(substituted on) 59'
FL	20	Ellis Jenkins	(substituted on) 70'
SH	21	Gareth Davies	(substituted on) 55'
FH	22	Rhys Priestland	(substituted on) 59'
CE	23	Scott Williams	(substituted on) 31'	(substituted off) 38'	(substituted on) 54'
Coach:
(New Zealand) Warren Gatland

Man of the Match:
Beauden Barrett (New Zealand)

Touch judges:
Jaco Peyper (South Africa)
Andrew Lees (Australia)
Television match official:
George Ayoub (Australia)

Notes:

- Elliot Dixon, Liam Squire and Ofa Tu'ungafasi (all New Zealand) made their international debuts.
- Brodie Retallick and Aaron Smith (both New Zealand) earned their 50th test caps.

== See also ==
- 2016 mid-year rugby union internationals
- History of rugby union matches between New Zealand and Wales
