= Luke Hamilton =

Scotland international rugby union footballer

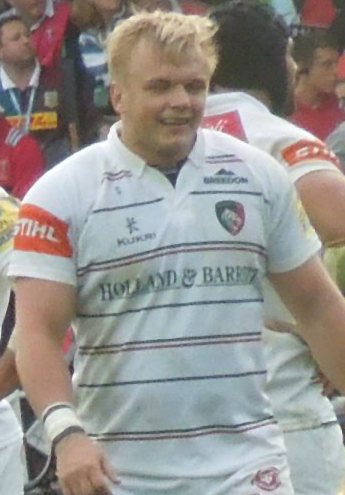
- Born: Luke John Hamilton; 7 January 1992 (age 34) Pembroke, Pembrokeshire, Wales
- Height: 191 cm (6 ft 3 in)
- Weight: 104 kg (16 st 5 lb)

Rugby union career
- Position: Back Row
Senior career
Years	Team	Apps	(Points)
2010–2014	Cardiff Blues	36	(15)
2014–2016	SU Agen	35	(10)
2016–2018	Leicester Tigers	51	(35)
2018–19	Edinburgh Rugby	13	(0)
2019	NTT DoCoMo Red Hurricanes	4	(0)
2019-2020	Bristol Bears	10	(0)
2020–	Oyonnax		
- Correct as of 1 July 2020
International career
Years	Team	Apps	(Points)
2010-12	Wales U20	13	(5)
2017–	Scotland	3	(0)
- Correct as of 18 June 2018

Luke John Hamilton (born 7 January 1992) is a Scottish international rugby union player who plays back row for Oyonnax. He has previously played for Cardiff Blues and Edinburgh in the Pro14, Agen in France's Top 14 and Leicester Tigers in Premiership Rugby.

== Career ==
Born in Pembrokeshire, Wales, Hamilton came through the academy at the Scarlets before moving to the Cardiff Blues, making his professional debut for the club in the 2010–11 season against Exeter in the Anglo-Welsh Cup. In April 2012 he was named in the Wales Under-20 squad for the Junior World Cup in South Africa. At the competition he played alongside future Wales internationals Rob Evans, Samson Lee and Ellis Jenkins and was part of the starting Wales XV that defeated New Zealand, the first team ever to beat New Zealand at U20 level.

Hamilton left the Blues to join SU Agen for the 2014–15 season, citing a lack of game time as one of his reasons for leaving. Agen won promotion that season from the Pro D2 to the Top 14. Hamilton signed for Leicester Tigers ahead of the 2016–17 season.

On 24 October 2017 Hamilton was called up for the Scotland squad for the 2017 end-of-year rugby union internationals. He qualifies through his Scottish father. On 18 November 2017 he made his Scotland debut against New Zealand at Murrayfield as a first half replacement.

On 5 June 2019, Hamilton signed with NTT Docomo Red Hurricanes in the Japan Rugby Top League for the 2019 season on a short-term contract.

On 8 July 2020, Hamilton returns to France to sign for Oyonnax in the Pro D2 for the 2020–21 season.
