= Ellis Jenkins =

Welsh rugby union footballer (born 1993)

- Born: Ellis Jenkins; 29 April 1993 (age 33) Church Village, Wales
- Height: 1.85 m (6 ft 1 in)
- Weight: 100 kg (220 lb; 15 st 10 lb)
- School: Bryn Celynnog Comprehensive School

Rugby union career
- Position: Openside Flanker
Senior career
Years	Team	Apps	(Points)
2011–2024	Cardiff Rugby	126	(55)
- Correct as of 7 June 2022
International career
Years	Team	Apps	(Points)
- Wales U16
- Wales U18
2012–2013	Wales U20	19	(10)
2016–2022	Wales	14	(0)
- Correct as of 03/02/2022

Ellis Jenkins (born 29 April 1993) is a Welsh former rugby union flanker who played for the Cardiff Rugby and for the Wales national team.

== Career ==
=== Cardiff Rugby ===
Jenkins made his debut for Cardiff in 2011 having previously played for their academy team and Cardiff RFC. He has been a regular member of the first-choice team since 2014, and was part of the victorious team that beat Gloucester in the final of the 2017–18 European Rugby Challenge Cup.

In April 2024, he announced his intention to retire at the conclusion of the season.

=== International career ===
Jenkins was a Wales under-20 international, captaining the side at the 2012 and 2013 Junior World Cup where Wales finished as runners up. Jenkins captained team consisting of a number of future Wales senior internationals: in the 2012 championship he captained the side which became the first side from any country to defeat New Zealand at that level. His team-mates that day included future senior Wales regulars Rob Evans and Samson Lee as well as several other players who would go on to earn senior Wales caps including Tom Prydie, Dan Baker, Eli Walker and Matthew Morgan, as well as future Scotland international Luke Hamilton. In 2013, Jenkins would captain the side which finished runners-up, Wales' best performance at U20 level to date.

Jenkins would have to bide his time before making his senior Wales appearance, in part due to intense competition for places in the Wales back row from the likes of Sam Warburton, Dan Lydiate, Justin Tipuric, Josh Navidi and Aaron Shingler. He finally made his debut aged 23 on the 2016 tour of New Zealand, coming off the bench in all three tests. He would captain Wales for the first time against South Africa in Washington, D.C. during the 2018 Wales rugby union tour to Argentina and the United States.

Unfortunately, during the final match against South Africa national rugby union team of the Under Armour Autumn Series, Jenkins suffered from a torn AC, MCL and numerous damages to the tendons in his left knee. This left him in rehabilitation for an extended period, making him unavailable for the 2019 Rugby World Cup.

== Personal life ==
Jenkins has been in a relationship with Welsh actress and singer Sophie Evans since they were teenagers. They married on 25 June 2022. They have two children, the second child being born in April 2025 called Louie.
