= History of rugby union matches between New Zealand and Wales =

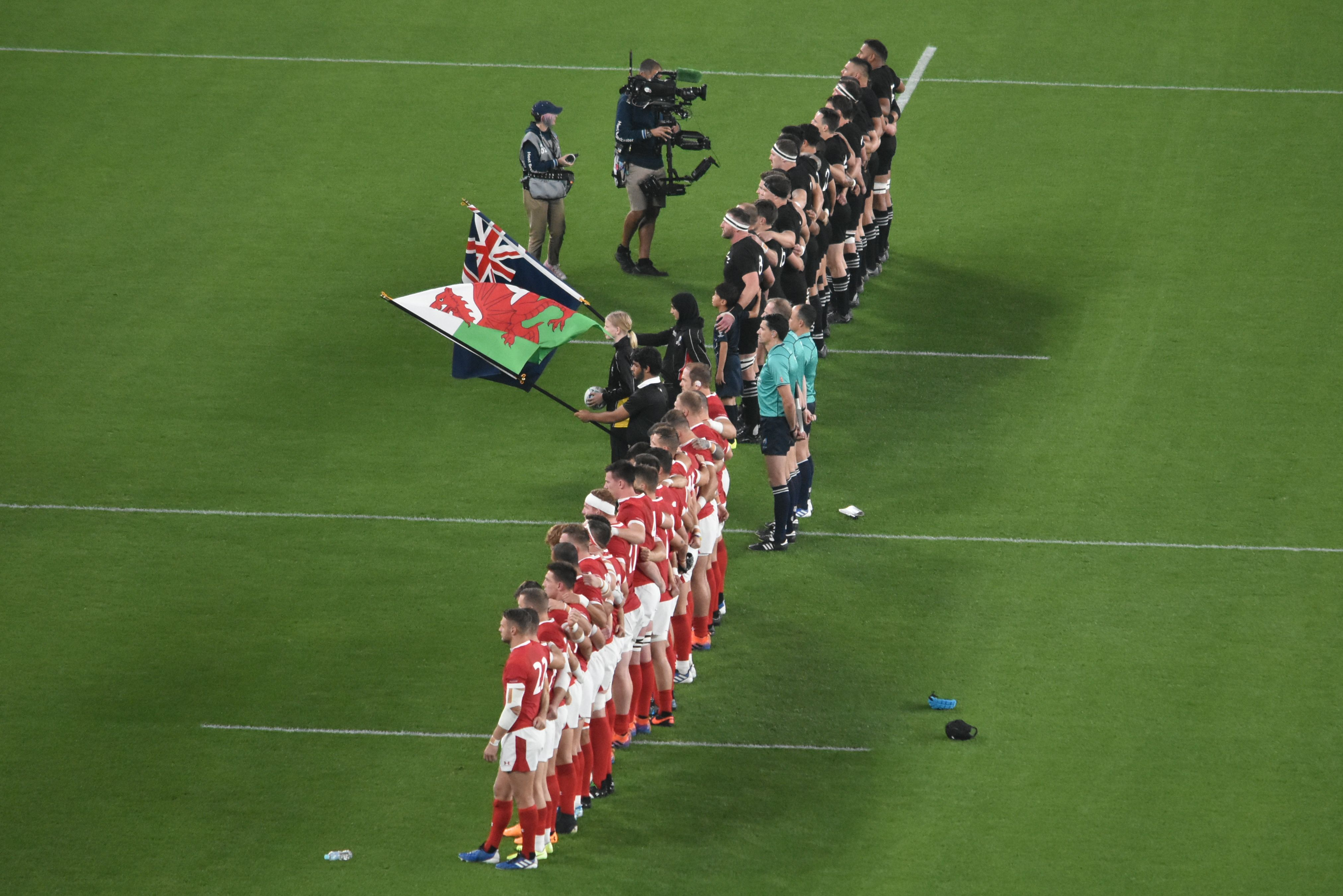
Wales and New Zealand at the 2019 Rugby World Cup

New Zealand and Wales have faced each other 39 times with New Zealand winning 35 and Wales winning 4. The first Test match between the two sides was played in 1905 at Cardiff Arms Park, with Wales winning 3–0, when the All Blacks were in Wales during the historic 1905–1906 All Blacks tour in Europe and North America. The loss was said to be controversial, as All Blacks wing Bob Deans claimed to have scored a try that would have brought them level. However, Wales were generally considered the better team with the All Blacks playing particularly poorly in the first half of the game. Two more Welsh victories in the next 50 years were balanced by a defeat by the 1924 All Black "Invincibles". Since the loss on 19 December 1953 New Zealand won 34 consecutive encounters. That run was finally broken after 73 years when Wales won in Cardiff 35–28 on 14 November 2026. Wales also played the touring New Zealand Natives team at St Helens on 22 December 1888 defeating them by 1 Goal to nil and the New Zealand Services at Cardiff on 21 April 1919, with Wales losing 3–6. Wales has accorded both of these matches 'test' status but neither game is considered to be an official test by New Zealand. Wales has also played the New Zealand Maori in Cardiff on 13 November 1982 defeating them 25–19. Neither country accorded that game test status.

== Summary ==
=== Overview ===
Details	Played	Won by New Zealand	Won by Wales	Drawn	New Zealand points	Wales points
In Wales	25	21	4	0	718	327
In New Zealand	10	10	0	0	405	95
Neutral venue	4	4	0	0	176	69
Overall	39	35	4	0	1,299	491

=== Records ===
Note: Date shown in brackets indicates when the record was or last set.

Record	New Zealand	Wales
Longest winning streak	34 (21 December 1963 – 13 November 2026)	2 (21 December 1935 – 20 December 1963)
Largest points for
Home	55 (23 June 2003)	35 (14 November 2026)
Away	55 (5 November 2022)	37 (2 November 2003)
Largest winning margin
Home	52 (23 June 2003)	7 (14 November 2026)
Away	38 (5 November 2005; 30 October 2021)	—N/a

== Results ==
No.	Date	Venue	Score	Winner	Competition	Ref.
1	16 December 1905	Cardiff Arms Park, Cardiff	3–0	Wales	The Original All Blacks	
2	29 November 1924	St Helen's, Swansea	0–19	New Zealand	1924–25 New Zealand tour of France, Great Britain and Ireland	
3	21 December 1935	National Stadium, Cardiff	13–12	Wales	1935–36 New Zealand tour of Canada, Great Britain and Ireland	
4	19 December 1953	National Stadium, Cardiff	13–8	Wales	1953–54 New Zealand tour of Europe and North America	
5	21 December 1963	National Stadium, Cardiff	0–6	New Zealand	1963–64 New Zealand tour of Europe and North America	
6	11 November 1967	National Stadium, Cardiff	6–13	New Zealand	1967 New Zealand tour of Great Britain, France and Canada	
7	31 May 1969	Lancaster Park, Christchurch	19–0	New Zealand	1969 Wales tour of New Zealand, Australia and Fiji	
8	14 June 1969	Eden Park, Auckland	33–12	New Zealand	1969 Wales tour of New Zealand, Australia and Fiji	
9	2 December 1972	National Stadium, Cardiff	16–19	New Zealand	1972–73 New Zealand tour of Europe and North America	
10	11 November 1978	National Stadium, Cardiff	12–13	New Zealand	1978 New Zealand tour of Great Britain and Ireland	
11	1 November 1980	National Stadium, Cardiff	3–23	New Zealand	1980 New Zealand tour of North America and Wales	
12	14 June 1987	Ballymore Stadium, Brisbane (Australia)	49–6	New Zealand	1987 Rugby World Cup	
13	28 May 1988	Lancaster Park, Christchurch	52–3	New Zealand	1988 Wales tour of New Zealand	
14	11 June 1988	Eden Park, Auckland	54–9	New Zealand	1988 Wales tour of New Zealand	
15	4 November 1989	National Stadium, Cardiff	9–34	New Zealand	1989 New Zealand tour of Great Britain, Ireland and North America	
16	31 May 1995	Ellis Park, Johannesburg (South Africa)	34–9	New Zealand	1995 Rugby World Cup	
17	29 November 1997	Wembley Stadium, London (England)	7–42	New Zealand	1997 New Zealand tour of Great Britain and Ireland	
18	23 November 2002	Millennium Stadium, Cardiff	17–43	New Zealand	2002 Autumn Internationals	
19	21 June 2003	Waikato Stadium, Hamilton	55–3	New Zealand	2003 Wales tour of Australia and New Zealand	
20	2 November 2003	Stadium Australia, Sydney (Australia)	53–37	New Zealand	2003 Rugby World Cup	
21	20 November 2004	Millennium Stadium, Cardiff	25–26	New Zealand	2004 Autumn Internationals	
22	5 November 2005	Millennium Stadium, Cardiff	3–41	New Zealand	2005 Autumn Internationals	
23	25 November 2006	Millennium Stadium, Cardiff	10–45	New Zealand	2006 Autumn Internationals	
24	22 November 2008	Millennium Stadium, Cardiff	9–29	New Zealand	2008 Autumn Internationals	
25	7 November 2009	Millennium Stadium, Cardiff	12–19	New Zealand	2009 Autumn Internationals	
26	19 June 2010	Carisbrook, Dunedin	42–9	New Zealand	2010 Wales tour of New Zealand	
27	26 June 2010	Waikato Stadium, Hamilton	29–10	New Zealand	2010 Wales tour of New Zealand	
28	27 November 2010	Millennium Stadium, Cardiff	25–37	New Zealand	2010 Autumn Internationals	
29	24 November 2012	Millennium Stadium, Cardiff	10–33	New Zealand	2012 Autumn Internationals	
30	22 November 2014	Millennium Stadium, Cardiff	16–34	New Zealand	2014 Autumn Internationals	
31	11 June 2016	Eden Park, Auckland	39–21	New Zealand	2016 Wales tour of New Zealand	
32	18 June 2016	Wellington Regional Stadium, Wellington	36–22	New Zealand	2016 Wales tour of New Zealand	
33	25 June 2016	Forsyth Barr Stadium, Dunedin	46–6	New Zealand	2016 Wales tour of New Zealand	
34	25 November 2017	Millennium Stadium, Cardiff	18–33	New Zealand	2017 Autumn Internationals	
35	1 November 2019	Tokyo Stadium, Chōfu (Japan)	40–17	New Zealand	2019 Rugby World Cup	
36	30 October 2021	Millennium Stadium, Cardiff	16–54	New Zealand	2021 Autumn Internationals	
37	5 November 2022	Millennium Stadium, Cardiff	23–55	New Zealand	2022 Autumn Internationals	
38	22 November 2025	Millennium Stadium, Cardiff	26–52	New Zealand	2025 Autumn Internationals	
39	14 November 2026	Millennium Stadium, Cardiff	35–28	Wales	2026 Nations Championship	

== List of series ==
Played	Won by New Zealand	Won by Wales	Drawn
4	4	0	0

Year	New Zealand	Wales	Series winner
1969	2	0	New Zealand
1988	2	0	New Zealand
2010	2	0	New Zealand
2016	3	0	New Zealand
