= Owen Williams (rugby union, born 1992) =

Wales international rugby union player (born 1992)

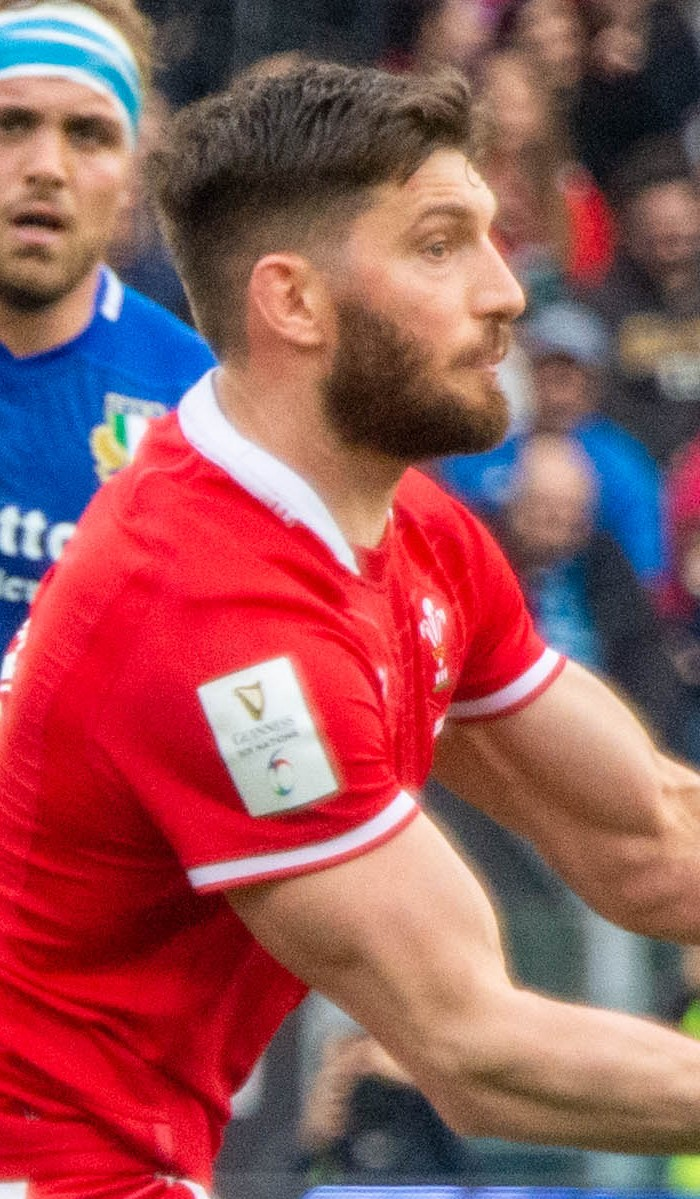
- Born: Owen Williams; 27 February 1992 (age 34) Neath, Wales
- Height: 185 cm (6 ft 1 in)
- Weight: 97 kg (15 st 4 lb)
- School: Ysgol Gyfun Ystalyfera

Rugby union career
- Position(s): Fly-half; Inside centre
- Current team: Nissa
Amateur team(s)
Years	Team	Apps	(Points)
2010–2013	Llanelli RFC	48	(319)
Senior career
Years	Team	Apps	(Points)
2011–2013	Scarlets	15	(149)
2013–2017	Leicester Tigers	101	(635)
2017–2020	Gloucester	44	(121)
2020–2021	Red Hurricanes	2	(21)
2021–2022	Worcester Warriors	6	(36)
2022–2025	Ospreys	40	(140)
2025–	Nissa	7	(53)
International career
Years	Team	Apps	(Points)
- Wales U18
2012	Wales U20	4	(0)
2017–2023	Wales	10	(10)

Owen Williams (born 27 February 1992) is a Welsh professional rugby union player who plays as a fly-half for the Nissa Rugby. He has represented Wales and Wales U20.

== Club career ==
=== Ospreys and Scarlets ===
Initially part of the Ospreys, Williams played regularly in their under-16s and under-18s teams before being signed for the Scarlets in 2010. Williams made his Scarlets debut in February 2011, against the Dragons in the LV= Cup.

=== Leicester ===
At the end of the 2012–13 season Williams departed from the Scarlets and moved to Leicester Tigers. Following the departure of fly-halves George Ford and Ryan Lamb, and former England fly-half Toby Flood's poor run of form combining with his decision to depart at the end of the season for Toulouse, Williams established himself as the club's first choice outside half. Williams's fine form and key contributions helped propel an initially misfiring Leicester Tigers back into the top four of the Premiership and into the quarterfinals of the Heineken Cup. In the wake of Leicester's 22–16 away win over local rivals Northampton Saints, Williams collecting 17 points from the kicking tee, Leicester's Director of Rugby Richard Cockerill publicly advocated Williams's inclusion onto Wales's 2014 summer tour to South Africa.

On 5 January 2015, it was announced Williams had signed a new contract to stay at Leicester Tigers, despite speculation he would be returning to Wales to play for his former region, the Scarlets, and increase his chances of getting a Wales call-up.

=== Gloucester ===
On 11 January 2017, Williams agreed a deal to leave Leicester for Premiership rivals Gloucester from the 2017–18 season.

=== Red Hurricanes Osaka ===
In June 2020, Williams left Gloucester to join Japanese side Red Hurricanes Osaka, led by former Gloucester head coach Johan Ackermann.

=== Worcester Warriors ===
On 28 April 2021, Williams returned to England to sign for Premiership side Worcester Warriors from the 2021–22 season.

=== Ospreys ===
On 5 October 2022, all Worcester players had their contacts terminated due to the liquidation of the company to which they were contracted. Following his release from Worcester, Williams joined the Ospreys on 6 December 2022, as injury cover heading into their European campaign. Williams made his Ospreys debut on 11 December 2022, coming off the bench against Leicester Tigers.

Williams signed a permanent Ospreys contract on 25 April 2023.

=== Nissa ===
Williams joined Nissa Rugby ahead of the 2025–26 season, as they sought promotion to Pro D2.

== International career ==
=== Wales U20 ===
Williams featured in the Wales under-20 national team; helping Wales to third in the 2012 IRB Junior World Championship.

=== Wales ===
In May 2017 he was named in the Wales senior squad for the 2017 Wales rugby union tour of Tonga and Samoa. He made his debut coming off the bench against Tonga on 16 June 2017.

Williams was again selected by Wales for the 2017 Autumn Internationals. Williams started against both Australia and New Zealand at inside centre.

Williams was set to win his fourth cap for Wales against Ireland in the 2020 Six Nations, having been named on the bench, but was injured in training and subsequently ruled out of the remainder of the tournament.

On 17 January 2023, Williams was recalled to the Wales squad for the 2023 Six Nations squad. He came off the bench on 4 February 2023 in the opening match against Ireland, the same fixture he was due to play in three years prior, and more than five years after his last cap. Williams made his first start for Wales at fly-half against England on 25 February 2023, and retained his position for the following match against Italy, as Wales earned their first win in the tournament. Williams moved back to the bench for the final fixture against France.
