= Evan Yardley =

Welsh rugby union player

- Born: 1 October 1993 (age 33) Wales
- Height: 1.78 m (5 ft 10 in)
- Weight: 96 kg (212 lb; 15 st 2 lb)

Rugby union career
- Position: Hooker
Senior career
Years	Team	Apps	(Points)
2013	Ospreys	1	(0)
2017	Scarlets	2	(0)
2021	Cardiff	2	(0)
- Correct as of 18 December 2021

Evan Yardley (born 1 October 1993) is a Welsh rugby union player, currently playing for United Rugby Championship side Cardiff. His preferred position is hooker.

== Cardiff ==
Yardley was called into Cardiff's European squad ahead of their European campaign. He made his debut for Cardiff in the first round of the 2021–22 European Rugby Champions Cup against Toulouse coming on as a replacement.
