= Dan Baker (rugby union) =

Wales international rugby union player

- Born: Dan Baker; 5 July 1992 (age 34) Neath, Wales
- Height: 188 cm (6 ft 2 in)
- Weight: 114 kg (17 st 13 lb; 251 lb)
- School: Cwmtawe Comprehensive School; Neath College

Rugby union career
- Position: Number 8
- Current team: Aberavon RFC
Youth career
- Ystradgynlais RFC
Senior career
Years	Team	Apps	(Points)
2011–2013	Swansea	46	(70)
2013–2020	Ospreys	92	(100)
2020–2021	Stade Montois	8	(0)
2021–2022	Dragons	11	(5)
2022–	Aberavon	3	(5)
- Correct as of 13 October 2022
International career
Years	Team	Apps	(Points)
2012	Wales U20	8	(5)
2013–2015	Wales	3	(0)
- Correct as of 15 October 2022

Dan Baker (born 5 July 1992) is a Wales international rugby union player. A back row forward, he plays for Ystradgynlais RFC having previously played for the Dragons, Stade Montois, Ospreys and Aberavon RFC

== Club career ==
Baker came through the Ospreys grade age system, beginning with Ystradgynlais RFC. He played for Swansea RFC, before makes his debut for the Ospreys in January 2013 in an Anglo-Welsh Cup fixture against the Dragons. He signed a contract extension with the Ospreys in April 2014. In November 2015, he signed a National Dual Contract with the Ospreys and the Welsh Rugby Union. Baker signed another extension with the Ospreys in November 2016.

Baker was named as man of the match in a Pro12 match against Connacht on 7 January 2017, scoring a try in the win. He suffered a serious knee injury on 15 October 2017, and was ruled out for the remainder of the season. Baker ultimately did not return until September 2019.

Baker departed the Ospreys in 2020 for Pro D2 club Stade Montois. He joined the Dragons in February 2021 initially to play until the end of the season, but was later signed for the following season. Baker was released by the Dragons in 2022, and subsequently joined Aberavon RFC. Baker returned to home town club Ystradgynlais RFC for the 2023-24 season.

== International career ==
Baker was selected for Wales U20 for the 2012 Six Nations Under 20s Championship. He was part of the Wales U20 team that beat New Zealand U20 in the 2012 IRB Junior World Championship, their first win over New Zealand at that age level, and a first Welsh win over a New Zealand national team since 1953.

In May 2013 he was selected in the Wales national rugby union team 32 man training squad for the summer 2013 tour to Japan. He made his international debut against Japan on 8 June 2013.

Baker made his third appearance for Wales on 8 August 2015, in a World Cup warm up match against Ireland. He was ultimately not selected for the final squad.

Baker was selected by caretaker coach Rob Howley in the squad for the 2016 end-of-year rugby union internationals, but did not appear in any of the match day squads, and ultimately gained no further caps for Wales.
