= Matthew Morgan (rugby union) =

Welsh rugby union player

- Born: Matthew James Morgan; 23 April 1992 (age 34) Basingstoke, Hampshire
- Height: 173 cm (5 ft 8 in)
- Weight: 78 kg (12 st 4 lb; 172 lb)
- School: Brynteg Comprehensive School
- University: Pencoed College

Rugby union career
- Position(s): Fly-half, Fullback
Senior career
Years	Team	Apps	(Points)
2010–2012	Swansea	21	(214)
2012	Bridgend	1	(12)
2014–2016	Bristol	25	(165)
- Correct as of 6 December 2015
Provincial / State sides
Years	Team	Apps	(Points)
2010–2014	Ospreys	65	(325)
2016–2023	Cardiff Rugby	122	(105)
- Correct as of 08 June 2022
International career
Years	Team	Apps	(Points)
- Wales U18
2011–2012	Wales U20	4	(64)
2014–2015	Wales	5	(0)
- Correct as of 1 October 2015

Matthew Morgan (born 23 April 1992) is a retired Wales international rugby union player who played for Ospreys and Cardiff Rugby.

== Club career ==
Morgan has previously played for Bridgend Athletic RFC, Swansea RFC, Bridgend RFC and the Ospreys. On 5 May 2014, Morgan signed for English club Bristol Rugby, despite competing in the RFU Championship from the 2014–15 season. During his time at Bristol Morgan was a crowd favourite, and was named Greene King IPA Championship Player of the Year for the 2014–15 season; nonetheless, Morgan decided to leave Bristol at the end of the 2015–16 season and return to Wales to sign for Cardiff Rugby, citing a desire to improve his chances into the Wales national team.

== International career ==
Morgan has played for Wales U20 and has had 4 caps with 64 points. He was a part of the Wales U20 side which defeated New Zealand 9-6 during the 2012 Junior World Championships, becoming the first side ever to beat New Zealand at U20 level, and the first victory by any Wales side over New Zealand since the 1950s.

Morgan made his Wales international debut versus South Africa at Kings Park Stadium in Durban on 14 June 2014 as a second-half replacement. He was named in the extended Wales training squad for the 2015 Rugby World Cup, and was the only squad member not playing in a top European league. Morgan made two appearances for Wales at the World Cup in their matches against Uruguay and Fiji.
