= Samson Lee =

Welsh rugby union player (born 1992)

- Born: 30 November 1992 (age 33) Swansea, Wales
- Height: 1.80 m (5 ft 11 in)
- Weight: 116 kg (256 lb; 18 st 4 lb)
- School: Coedcae Comprehensive School; Coleg Sir Gar

Rugby union career
- Position: Tighthead Prop
Amateur team(s)
Years	Team	Apps	(Points)
- Ammanford RFC
–	Felinfoel RFC		
Senior career
Years	Team	Apps	(Points)
2010–2012	Llanelli RFC	15	(5)
2012–2023	Scarlets	165	(20)
- Correct as of 14 December 2023
International career
Years	Team	Apps	(Points)
2012	Wales U20	8	(0)
2013–2020	Wales	45	(5)
- Correct as of 14 December 2023

Samson Lee (born 30 November 1992) is a Welsh former professional rugby union player. Lee played for the Scarlets, as well as local teams Llanelli and Ammanford. His position is prop forward. Lee has represented Wales, making his debut against Argentina in November 2013.

== Club career ==
Lee began playing rugby with the Felinfoel RFC youth side, as well as with Coedcae School. Lee joined the Scarlets at age 15, and progressed through the academy while playing for Ammanford RFC and later Llanelli RFC. He made his first Scarlets appearance in a preseason friendly against Narbonne.

Lee was named in the 2013–14 Pro12 Dream Team, along with teammates Gareth Davies and Liam Williams.

In 2015, Lee signed a national dual contract with the Scarlets and WRU. He extended the contract the following year.

Ahead of the 2016–17 Pro12 season, Lee underwent shoulder surgery, missing the beginning of the season. Lee was part of the Scarlets squad that won the league that season, but suffered a recurrence of a knee injury in the final.

Lee extended his Scarlets contract in 2020, and on 11 October 2020, made his 150th appearance for the Scarlets.

In 2022, Lee suffered another achilles injury, a long term injury. Lee made his return to the field on 6 May 2023, for Llandovery RFC against Newport, after 14 months of recovery. Shortly after returning to play, he signed a new contract with the Scarlets.

Lee announced his retirement on 14 December 2023, having failed to fully overcome the achilles injury.

== International career ==
In 2012 Lee represented the Wales national under-20 rugby union team, in both the 2012 Six Nations Under 20s Championship and 2012 IRB Junior World Championship. He was part of the U20 squad that defeated New Zealand U20 in the Junior World Championship for the first time.

In October 2012 he was called into the Wales squad for the 2012 end-of-year rugby union internationals, but did not make his debut. He made his full international debut versus Argentina on 16 November 2013 as a second-half replacement. He came off the bench in the next two test matches, against Samoa and Australia. Lee was selected in the squad for the 2014 Six Nations Championship, but did not gain any further caps.

Lee was selected in the squad for the 2014 Wales rugby union tour of South Africa, coming off the bench in the first test. He made his first start in the second test, as Wales narrowly lost to South Africa, in place of stalwart Adam Jones. Lee was cited for a headbutt on Flip van der Merwe and received a five week ban. By the autumn, Lee was pushing for first choice, starting all four tests in the series.

For the 2015 Six Nations Championship, Lee retained the starting berth, but was ruled out of the second match against Scotland, having suffered a concussion in the opening fixture against England. He returned to the team after recovering, but suffered an achilles injury against Ireland, which ruled him out for the remainder of the season. Lee overcame odds to recover in time for the 2015 Rugby World Cup. During the tournament, Lee scored his first international try, coming against Uruguay.

Lee started all five matches for Wales during the 2016 Six Nations Championship. During the match against England, he was racially abused by prop Joe Marler, for which Marler received a two match ban and £20,000 fine. Lee also played against England in a warm up match ahead of the 2016 Wales rugby union tour of New Zealand. Lee played in all three of the tests, starting the final two.

A knee injury ruled Lee out of the 2017 Wales rugby union tour of Tonga and Samoa. Another achilles injury would see Lee unable to participate in the 2017 end-of-year rugby union internationals. Lee recovered in time to be selected for the 2018 Six Nations Championship, starting the first three matches of the series. A back injury prevented Lee from featuring in any of the tests on the 2018 Wales rugby union tour to Argentina and the United States. Finally, a hamstring injury kept Lee out of the 2018 end-of-year rugby union internationals.

Lee recovered in time to participate in the 2019 Six Nations Championship, featuring in the first two tests before succumbing to injury, as Wales went on to win the Grand Slam. Lee was not selected in the squad for the 2019 Rugby World Cup. After more than a year out of international reckoning, Lee returned to the Wales squad for the 2020 end-of-year rugby union internationals, playing in four of the tests. Injury would prevent his selection for the 2021 Six Nations Championship. Lee earned a recall to the Wales squad for the 2021 July rugby union tests, following an injury to Tomas Francis, but he did not appear in any match day squad.

=== International tries ===
Try	Opponent	Location	Venue	Competition	Date	Result
1	Uruguay	Cardiff, Wales	Millennium Stadium	2015 Rugby World Cup	20 September 2015	Win

== Personal life ==
Lee is a member of the Traveller community. He was subject to racial abuse from England prop Joe Marler during a Six Nations match in 2016, for which Marler received a fine and two match ban.
