= Tomas Francis =

Wales international rugby union player

- Born: 27 April 1992 (age 34) York, England
- Height: 1.85 m (6 ft 1 in)
- Weight: 135 kg (21 st 4 lb; 298 lb)
- School: Sedbergh School & Terrington Hall School
- University: University of Leeds

Rugby union career
- Position: Prop
Amateur team(s)
| Years | Team | Apps | (Points) |
- Malton and Norton RUFC
Senior career
| Years | Team | Apps | (Points) |
| 2012–2013 | Doncaster Knights | 20 | (10) |
| 2013–2014 | London Scottish | 23 | (0) |
| 2014–2021 | Exeter Chiefs | 116 | (10) |
| 2021–2023 | Ospreys | 27 | (5) |
| 2023–2026 | Provence | 37 | (0) |
| 2026– | Sale Sharks | 0 | (0) |
- Correct as of 21st March 2026
International career
| Years | Team | Apps | (Points) |
| 2015– | Wales | 82 | (15) |
- Correct as of 21st March 2026

Tomas Francis (born 27 April 1992) is a Wales international rugby union player who plays at tight head prop for Sale Sharks.

== Club career ==
Francis signed his first professional contract with Doncaster Knights in February 2012 at the age of 19, he was playing for amateur club Malton and Norton RUFC when he signed for the Knights, where he had been playing from the age of 4. Francis signed with London Scottish in 2013 after Doncaster were relegated to National League 1, he made 23 appearances in one season for Scottish before being signed by Aviva Premiership side Exeter Chiefs for the 2014–15 season. He was a replacement as Exeter Chiefs defeated Wasps to be crowned champions of the 2016-17 English Premiership.

On 12 January 2021, Francis confirmed his move to Welsh region Ospreys in the Pro14 on a three-year deal from the 2021-22 season.

In 2023, Francis signed a three-year deal with the French club Provence.

In January 2026, he signed for Prem Rugby club Sale Sharks ahead of the following season.

== International career ==
On 20 January 2015, Wales head coach Warren Gatland said during a press conference that he had a long debate about whether to include Francis in the 34-man squad for the 2015 Six Nations Championship but had decided against it due to current back injuries Francis was carrying.

On 9 March 2015, Francis was called up to train with Wales.

On 16 March 2015, Francis was added to the Wales squad prior to the final Six Nations game against Italy.

On 2 June 2015, Francis was selected in Wales 47-man World Cup training squad.

On 29 August 2015, Francis made his Wales debut in a 16–10 World Cup warm-up victory over Ireland. He was called up as cover for the 2017 British & Irish Lions tour to New Zealand.

Francis was named in the squad for the 2026 Six Nations by Steve Tandy.

=== International tries ===
| Try | Opponent | Location | Venue | Competition | Date | Result |
|---|---|---|---|---|---|---|
| 1 | South Africa | Cardiff, Wales | Millennium Stadium | 2018 Autumn Internationals | 24 November 2018 | Win |
| 2 | Scotland | Cardiff, Wales | Millennium Stadium | 2022 Six Nations | 12 February 2022 | Win |
| 3 | Georgia | Nantes, France | Stade de la Beaujoire | 2023 Rugby World Cup | 7 October 2023 | Win |

== Personal life ==
He was educated at both Terrington Hall School and Sedbergh School. Francis has a degree in Mechanical Engineering which he earned at the University of Leeds. He signed his first professional contract at Doncaster Knights while completing his studies.

Francis qualifies for Wales through his grandmother, Eirlys Walters, who was born in Abercraf.
