= Rob Evans (rugby union) =

Wales international rugby union footballer

- Born: Robert Evans; 14 April 1992 (age 34) Haverfordwest, Wales
- Height: 1.86 m (6 ft 1 in)
- Weight: 116 kg (256 lb; 18 st 4 lb)
- School: Spittal VC School; Sir Thomas Picton School

Rugby union career
- Position: Loosehead Prop
Amateur team(s)
Years	Team	Apps	(Points)
- Haverfordwest RFC
Senior career
Years	Team	Apps	(Points)
2010–2014	Carmarthen Quins	34	(30)
2013–2022	Scarlets	151	(45)
2022–2023	Dragons	11	(0)
2023–2025	Miami Sharks	12	(0)
- Correct as of 28 January 2024
International career
Years	Team	Apps	(Points)
2011–2012	Wales U20	13	(0)
2015–2020	Wales	39	(5)
- Correct as of 25 April 2021

Robert "Bobby" Evans (born 14 April 1992) is a Welsh international rugby union player. He played at prop for the Miami Sharks of Major League Rugby (MLR). He previously play for the Dragons.

== Rugby career ==
Evans made his regional debut for the Scarlets during the 2012–13 season, coming on as a substitute against Sale Sharks in the LV Cup. He had previously played for Carmarthen Quins in the Welsh Premier Division. After stints at Scarlets and Dragons, Evans signed with the Miami Sharks of Major League Rugby.

== International ==
Evans has been a Wales Under-20s international, and helped the team reach third place in the 2012 IRB Junior World Championship in South Africa, playing in the front row alongside fellow Scarlets Kirby Myhill and Samson Lee.

In November 2013, Evans was called into the senior Wales squad for the Autumn international matches.

On 20 January 2015, Evans was named in the 34-man Wales squad for the 2015 Six Nations Championship, making his debut as a half time replacement in the win against Ireland.

=== International tries ===
Try	Opponent	Location	Venue	Competition	Date	Result
1	England	London, England	Twickenham	2016 Summer Internationals	29 May 2016	Loss
