= Richard Lancaster =

- Born: 29 May 1980 (age 46) Swansea, Wales
- Height: 1.91 m (6 ft 3 in)
- Weight: 108 kg (17 st 0 lb)
- University: Swansea University

Rugby union career
- Position: Lock/Flanker
Senior career
Years	Team	Apps	(Points)
1996-2001	Swansea RFC		
Coaching career
- Years: Team
- 2007–2014: Swansea University RFC
- 2009–2014: Ospreys Under 20s
- 2011-2012: Bridgend Ravens
- 2014-: Swansea RFC

Richard Lancaster (born 29 May 1980) is a Welsh rugby union coach.

== Playing career ==
Lancaster played second row and back row for Mumbles, Swansea University RFC, Swansea RFC and London Welsh RFC, before retiring from competitive rugby at the age of 24 due to a serious knee injury.

== Coaching career ==
Following Lancaster's premature retirement from playing he moved into coaching first with Mumbles RFC and then taking the Head Coach role for Swansea University. Lancaster presided over the team for 7 years, in his first year winning promotion and taking the team into the British Universities and Colleges Premiership. He had a successful tenure as coach maintaining their Premiership status and securing a proud 5 wins v 3 defeats in the Annual Welsh Varsity.

Year	Location	Winner/Holder	Swansea	Cardiff	Attendance
2007	Cardiff Arms Park	Swansea	18	0	5,200
2008	Cardiff Arms Park	Cardiff	9	19	8,100
2009	Cardiff Arms Park	Cardiff	6	9	10,800
2010	Liberty Stadium	Swansea	16	12	11,400
2011	Millennium Stadium	Swansea	28	18	14,789
2012	Millennium Stadium	Cardiff	13	33	15,622
2013	Millennium Stadium	Swansea	21	13	14,103
2014	Millennium Stadium	Swansea	19	15	15,835

During this time, Lancaster's started working with then Ospreys coaches Sean Holley and Scott Johnson and was appointed Head Coach of the Ospreys Under 20's team and placed with Steve Tandy as coaches of the Bridgend Ravens. At his time as Director of Rugby, Johnson was quoted as saying that these were two of the most promising young coaches in Welsh Rugby and flagged their names as potential future Ospreys coaches.

Lancaster moved from the Ravens to Swansea, firstly in the position of Performance Manager in the 2013–14 season and then following Swansea relegation out of the top flight of Welsh Rugby Lancaster was appointed Director of Rugby for the start of the 2014–15 season. He is joined on the coaching team by Team Manager Paul Whapham, Backs coach Rhodri Jones, Forwards coach Christian Loader and Skills Coach Ben Lewis.

In 2014 the All Whites were relegated from the Welsh Premier league on the final day of the season when despite beating Neath at St Helens, a bonus point for Aberavon sent Swansea into the SWALEC Championship. This provoked a complete revamp of the club with Stephen Hughes taking the position of chairman, Keith Colclough as managing director and Richard Lancaster leading a coaching team of former players including Rhodri Jones, Chris Loader and Ben Lewis. In their first season Swansea missed out on promotion back to the Premiership, finishing in second place overall, but were consequently promoted in the 15/16 season along with Merthyr, RGC 1404 and Bargoed.

Swansea struggled to adapt to the Premiership in their first two seasons back at the top flight although despite a crippling injury list, the 17/18 season showed much promise with the side recording five wins, a draw and 10 losing bonus points for losing the game within 7 points.

The 2018–19 season held particular significance for the club, as up to five teams were scheduled for relegation from the Welsh Premiership. This reduction was intended to bring the league to 12 teams for the 2019–20 season.

The coaching team of Richard Lancaster, Hugh Gustafson, Ben Lewis, Nick Roberts and Liam Carpener-Jones are currently preparing a squad consisting of many of the 17/18 squad along with new additions which are being announced on the club website regularly.

=== Professional life ===
Lancaster currently works for Swansea University as Head of Sport and Corporate Engagement. Lancaster helped develop the concept of the Welsh Varsity.
