= Harry Payne (rugby union) =

Wales international rugby union footballer

- Born: Harry Thomas Payne; 10 December 1907 Llangyfelach, Wales
- Died: 22 December 2000 (aged 93) Morriston, Wales
- School: Tirdeunaw School, Treboeth
- Occupation: miner

Rugby union career
- Position: Prop
Amateur team(s)
Years	Team	Apps	(Points)
–	Mynyddbach RFC		
–	Morriston RFC		
1931–?	Swansea RFC		
–	Royal Navy		
International career
Years	Team	Apps	(Points)
1935	Wales	1	(0)

Harry Thomas Payne (10 December 1907 – 22 December 2000) was a Welsh international rugby union prop who played club rugby for Swansea and was capped for Wales on one occasion. A hard forward player Payne was described as 'tough-as-teak' and was still playing for veteran teams at the age of 84.

== Rugby career ==
Payne was born in Llangyfelach and at the age of 14 had left school to join his father in the coal industry, tending the pit ponies. Payne initially had a trial for local soccer team Swansea A.F.C. but switched sports to rugby union playing for both Mynyddbach and Morriston before joining first class side Swansea in 1931. On 28 September 1935, Payne was chosen to play for the Swansea team to face the touring New Zealand team. When Swansea beat the All Blacks, they became the first club team to do so and also the first team to beat all three major Southern Hemisphere teams.

Later in 1935, Payne was selected to face the same touring New Zealand team for Wales along with teammates Don Tarr, Haydn Tanner and Claude Davey. This was Payne's one and only cap for his country, but it was a memorable game for Wales as they won 13–12, with fourteen men for the last ten minutes after Tarr was stretchered off with a broken neck. Although being selected as a reserve player on several occasions, Payne never played for Wales again.

During the 1938/39 season Payne was chosen to captain Swansea, but with the outbreak of war, Payne joined the Royal Marines. While in the marines he played rugby for both the marines and the Royal Navy and played in two wartime international for Wales against England. He saw action as a soldier in North Africa, Sicily and Italy, and was awarded six battle medals. On returning to Wales during peacetime he returned to working in the mines.

His later career included playing for veteran teams; and in 1989 at the age of 82, he turned out for a match against Bordeaux. His rugby career was finally halted after he broke his ankle while playing for Swansea Veterans RFC, in a match in the Netherlands in 1992.

=== International matches played ===
Wales

- New Zealand 1935

== Bibliography ==
- Billot, John (1972). All Blacks in Wales. Ferndale: Ron Jones Publications.
- Smith, David; Williams, Gareth (1980). Fields of Praise: The Official History of The Welsh Rugby Union. Cardiff: University of Wales Press. ISBN 0-7083-0766-3.

Rugby Union Captain
Preceded by Ronnie Williams	Swansea RFC Captain; 1937–1938	Succeeded by Ernie Harris
