= Swansea University RFC =

Welsh rugby union club, based at Swansea University

SURFC
- Full name: Swansea University Rugby Football Club
- Union: Welsh Rugby Union
- Founded: 1920
- Location: Sketty Lane, Swansea, Wales
- Ground: St Helen's Rugby and Cricket Ground
- Chairman: Stan Addicott
- Coach: Hugh Gustafson
- Captain: Wills Austin
- League: BUCS Super Rugby 2025-26
Team kit

Official website
- www.pitchero.com/clubs/swanseauniversityrfc/

Swansea University Rugby Football Club is a Welsh amateur rugby union club based at Swansea University, Swansea. It competes in the BUCS Rugby Union Super Rugby League as of the 2021/2022 season. The club has experienced major success, winning the UAU Championship six times and the BUSA Championship twice. Swansea are also the current champions of Wales having won the 2022 Welsh Varsity in the Freshers, Women's and Men's varsity match.

The club was formed in 1920. They currently train at the Sketty Lane 3G rugby pitches, in Swansea.

== History ==
=== Formation and early history ===
University College Swansea was formed in 1920 and the rugby playing students soon organized themselves into an active club. Although other Welsh University Colleges at Aberystwyth, Cardiff and Bangor had been well established for many years previous, Swansea soon proved, during the first twenty years of its existence, that it was one of the most successful and leading rugby playing universities in Wales and England. By 1930 the relatively small and tight knit campus of approximately 400 students was benefiting from the influx of players produced by local rugby playing schools. Young student players came from such areas as Carmarthen, Llanelli, Gwendraeth Valley, Amman Valley, Gowerton, Neath and Port Talbot as well as Swansea. Rugby fixtures were played against neighbouring "second class" clubs but the 'bread and butter' competitions were provided by the University of Wales Championship. This progressed through to the University Athletic Association (U.A.U.) competition which included the best of the English Universities. Until the establishment of the Sketty Lane playing fields around 1936, facilities were provided on the Singleton Campus and at St. Helens, the home of Swansea RFC.

=== 1930s ===
The 1930s proved to be a "golden era" with a number of student players and university teams gaining unprecedented success. In 1929 the College XV include three players who would later achieve great distinction by captaining Wales at senior level – Watcyn Thomas, Claude Davy and Idwal Rees. Later, student Haydn Tanner (1936–1939) also captained his country in the post World War II period. He became a British Lion (1938) and one of the few players to represent his country before and after the war. When Swansea RFC (the "All Whites") defeated New Zealand in 1935, six Swansea University students (past and present) played in the "All Whites" three-quarter line – Granville Davies, Ronnie Williams, Gwyn Griffiths, Clause Davey, W TH Davies and Haydn Tanner.

Swansea University proved to be an exceptionally successful team in the U.A.U. Championship. They were winners in 1933, 34, 35, 36, 37 – losing finalists in 1938 and champions again in 1939 after defeating Loughborough by six points to three at Cheltenham, under the captaincy of Sid Harris. By the outbreak of World War II Swansea had gained a reputation for being one of the foremost colleges in England and Wales – a reputation achieved in a short period of time and with comparatively few students. The U.A.U. Championship was cancelled at the outbreak of hostilities but the College still continued to field a XV with students who were allowed to continue their studies and supplemented by those evacuated to Swansea from the University of London.

=== Post-war ===
In the immediate post-war period returning service men soon helped to re-establish the College's reputation on the rugby field whilst also creating a strong social ethos. The University of Wales Championship was again won in 1946/47 and 1947/48. Viv Davies captained the side in 1948/49 and later went on to give stalwart service to Swansea RFC as a player and administrator. However, in the 1940s and 50s the U.A.U. Championship trophy eluded Swansea until 1965 when, captained by Glyn Morgan, they shared the title with Durham University. During this period three former students, Alun Thomas (Wales and British Lions), Ken Richards and Brian Davies were "capped" for their country.

=== 1970s ===
By the 1970s the venue of the U.A.U. Final had been established at Twickenham, the headquarters of the RFU. This helped the Championship gain extra kudos and it was not long before Swansea made its first appearance there in 1973, losing to a strong Loughborough side. In 1976 the 1st XV again reached the Final, along with 2nd and 3rd XV, indicating the strength in depth that was developing in Swansea.

=== 1980s and 1990s ===
During the 1980s and 90s there was a hint of another "golden era" when Swansea University 1st XV appeared in four consecutive Finals from 1988 to 1991, but with no victory. In 1995 Swansea again reached the Final of the now newly named British Universities Sports Association (BUSA) championship, which included an increased number of "newer" universities. In a magnificent game against West London Institute (now Brunel University), and in spite of scoring four tries to one against the opposition, Swansea were pipped by 31 points to 30. As if not to be deterred, there were successful returns to the BUSA Twickenham finals in 1998 and 1999 when Swansea carried off the trophy in two successive years under the captaincy of Ben Williams (1998) and Ben Martin (1999). The 2nds XV also won their BUSA Final in 1999.

It is not surprising that during the successful times of the 1980s and 90s, when Swansea was again regarded as one of the best university teams in England and Wales, some outstanding players were attracted to study at Swansea. There were excellent opportunities for development. Mark Wyatt progressed from 3rd XV Captain to 1st XV Captain and on to play full back for Swansea RFC and Wales. Over twenty students went on to represent Wales and England. Also, Mark Schieffler and English born Mark Williams played for Canada whilst Ed Macedo played for Portugal. Paul Throrburn and Robert Howley both captained Wales, whilst in addition to Robert Howley, Gwyn Evans, Dafydd James, Dwayne Peel, Stephen Jones and Alun Wyn Jones became British and Irish Lions.

At a lower, but no means insignificant level, Swansea students regularly gained selection for leading Welsh clubs, Wales U21, Wales Students and Wales Universities., while a considerable number continued their studies at Oxford or Cambridge and won "blues". Regular fixtures were played against "Oxbridge" teams. In the early days of the WRU Challenge Cup competition the University side played Llanelli and Glamorgan Wanderers at Sketty Lane and Newport at Rodney Parade. These games added colour to the fixture list. In 2002 the University reached the final of the Heineken Students European Championship, and played against French side, University of Pau at St. Helen's.

=== 2000s ===
Since the early 2000s, Swansea University RFC has continued to compete in university rugby, with the 1st XV participating in the upper levels of BUCS rugby. The annual Welsh Varsity match against Cardiff University has remained a prominent fixture in the club's season. Several players associated with Swansea University, including Alun Wyn Jones, Jonathan Spratt, and Ciaran Ruddock, later progressed to higher levels of representative rugby. The club has also maintained participation across multiple university teams during the professional era of the sport.

It is not only on the playing side of Swansea students have excelled for many have reached the top echelons of rugby officiating and administration. Chris White is a former international referee who officiated at three Rugby World Cups and has been in charge of three Heineken Cup Finals. Former 1930s and 40s students Gwyn Roblin, Hermas Evans and Alun Thomas became presidents of the Welsh Rugby Union. Hermas and Raynor Jones also both chaired the International Rugby Football Board (IRB). Ex-Wales international Mark Bennet also went on to become the fitness coach of the Wales national team. Richard Lancaster, Head coach of the team during one of its most successful periods in recent times has gone on to coach the Ospreys Under 20s and is currently Head Coach at Swansea RFC

Over the years the University Rugby Football Club has been supported by students and staff. Amongst the latter, the contributions of Vernon Jones, I G Evans, Professor Bryn Gravenor, Professor David Herbert, Dr David Treharne, Roger Elias, Keir Lewis, Richard Lancaster, Stan Addicott and Professor Steve Mellalieu have made amendments to the Club, alongside those committee member David Matthews has also been of support. Nowadays, with sporting facilities at Sketty Lane, a growing student population of over 10,000 and with four teams regularly representing the University in university championships, the Rugby Club continues to provide both competitive and social opportunities for students.

== Coaching staff ==
=== 1st XV ===
Director of Rugby and Forwards Coach: Scott Baldwin

Head Coach and Backs Coach: Luke Scully (Wales)

Strength and Conditioning Coach: (Wales) Tom Jones

Defensive Coach (Wales) Joe Grabham

Team Manager: (Wales) Steff Jones

=== 2nd XV ===
Head Coach and Forwards Coach: (England) Huw Sutton

Backs Coach: (England) Max Naggy

Team Manager: (Wales) Steff Jones

=== 3rd XV ===
Forwards Coach: (Italy) Chris Paddison

Team Manager and Head Coach: (England) Hamish Minton

Backs Coach: (Alabama) Garin "Meathead" Lloyd

=== 4th XV ===
Head Coach and Forwards Coach: (Wales) Max Harris

Team Manager and Backs Coach: (Wales) Jocko Dowdall

== Club Captains ==
1st XV : (Wales) Wills Austin

1st XV Peoples Captain: (England) (India) Tom Furtado Mills

2nd XV : (Wales) Finn Thomas

3rd XV : (England) Will Field

4th XV : (Wales) Max Harris

5th XV : (Kenya) James Price

Barbarian Captain : (South Africa) SGC

== Club Officials ==
Club Captain : (Wales) Dafydd Evans

Junior Club Captain : (England) George Buckle

Treasurer : (England) Joe Charlesworth

Secretary : (England) Fin Yallop

Social Secretary : (Wales) (England) Ruari Jones & Ruari Barton

Charity Officers : (Wales) (Wales) Dan Greenway & Ethan Ranson

== Welsh Varsity Match ==
Each year Swansea University and Cardiff University clash in the Welsh Varsity Match. The inaugural match was played in 1997 at the Cardiff Arms Park, the home of Cardiff RFC. In its early years of the Varsity, the match was held alternately between St Helen's Rugby Ground and the Cardiff Arms Park, until 2003, where the match was moved to the neutral venue Brewery Field, the home of Bridgend RFC. The match was then held at the home of Cardiff RFC for 3 seasons between 2007 and 2009. After outgrowing the Arms Park, the match was moved to Swansea's Liberty Stadium.

Swansea have won 9 out of the 14 previous matches, drawing only once in 2001. Young players who have donned the Green and White of Swansea range from the British & Irish Lion Alun Wyn Jones who helped Swansea gain victory in the 2005, to Welsh International Jonathan Spratt who helped Swansea to victory in 2007, as well as Professional players such as the Ospreys' Ben Lewis, the Scarlets' Rhys Lawrence and Wales 7s player David Evans.

The Varsity match has become the highlight to the University sporting calendar year, with the match regularly attracting over 10,000 supporters, that include students, university staff, parents and officials. Due to its popularity among students and rugby fans alike, the latest Varsity, the 15th annual match, took place at the home of Welsh Rugby, the Millennium Stadium. The 2011 Match was also broadcast live on S4C, while also featuring on BBC Wales' Scrum V programme.

== Honours ==
=== UAU Champions ===
1932–1933

1933–1934

1935–1936

1936–1937

1938–1939

1964–1965

=== BUSA Champions ===
1997–1998

1998–1999

== International honours ==
Haydn Tanner – Wales and British & Irish Lions

Gwyn Evans – Wales and British & Irish Lions

Alun Thomas – Wales and British & Irish Lion

Rob Howley – Wales and British & Irish Lions

Dafydd James – Wales and British & Irish Lions

Alun Wyn Jones – Wales and British & Irish Lions

Dwayne Peel – Wales and British & Irish Lions

(Wales) Watcyn Thomas

(Wales) Claude Davy

(Wales) Idwal Rees

(Wales) Ken Richards

(Wales) Brian Davies

(Wales) Mark Wyatt

(Wales) Paul Thorburn

(Wales) Mark Bennett

(Wales) David Weatherley

(Wales) Andy Williams

(Wales) Ian Buckett

(Wales) Andrew Lewis

(Wales) Andy Moore

(Wales) Richie Pugh

(Wales) Tal Selley

(Wales) Jonathan Spratt

(Wales) Rory Thornton

(England) Adedayo Adebayo

(Canada) Mark Williams

(Canada) Mark Schieffler

(Portugal) Ed Macedo

(Mauritius) William De Robillard

(Luxembourg) Saman Rezapour

(Luxembourg) Anton Agassi

(Philippines) Steve Howorth

(Philippines) Lawrence Beboso

(Greece) Theo Skagias

(Malta) Daniel Apsee

(Malta) Rhodri Apsee

(Malta) Joseph Greaves

(Latvia) Tom Kaijaks

(Hong Kong) Zac Cinnamond

(Hong Kong) Jonny Rees

(Hong Kong) Dylan White

(Bahrain) David Evans

(Qatar) James Phillips

(Switzerland) Nathan Thomas

(Netherlands) Tom Bogemann

(Germany) Iestyn Rees

(Guyana) Jules Jardim

=== Age Grade International honours ===
Colin Langley –Wales u15 Wales u18 Wales u21

Mark Langley – Wales u21

Daniel George – Wales u21

Andrew Grabham – Wales u21

Neil Hennessy – Wales u21

Gareth Thomas – Wales u21

Joel Galley – Wales u20

Rhys Lawrence – Wales u20

Reuben Tucker – Wales u20

Steff Hughes – Wales u20

Connor Lloyd – Wales u20

Nicky Thomas – Wales u20

Ciaran Ruddock – Ireland u20

Morgan Jones – Wales u20

Lewis Jones – Wales u20

Garin Lloyd – Wales u20

Louis Fletcher – Wales u20

Wills Austin – Wales u20

Will Plessis – Wales u20

Fraser Jones – Wales u19

David Francis – Wales u19

Tom Bogemann – Netherlands u20

Theo Currie – Scotland u20

Freddie Drake Lee - Scotland u19

Benji Pattenden - Zimbabwe u20

Will Veys - Belgium u20

Salvador Guimarães - Portugal u20
