= Morriston RFC =

Welsh rugby union club, based in Morriston

(Wales) Morriston RFC
- Nickname: Monkeys
- Founded: 1876; 150 years ago
- Location: Morriston, Wales
- Ground: Maes Collen
- Chairman: Lee May
- President: Gwynne Lewis
- Coach(es): Paul Thomas, Colin Jones
- League: WRU Division 2 West Central (2025-26)
- 2024-25: Relegated
Team kit

Official website
- mrfc.club

Morriston Rugby Football Club is a rugby union team from the village of Morriston, Swansea in West Wales. The club is a member of the Welsh Rugby Union and is a feeder club for the Ospreys.

The club was founded in 1876 and has produced a number of established Welsh internationals, such as Paul Moriarty, Richard Moriarty, Ross Moriarty, Anthony Clement, who also Represented the British & Irish Lions on two tours 1989 & 1993, along with Fred Jowett * Sid Bevan 1904 Lions Tour to Australia & New Zealand

. They were the first Club to win the Swalec bowl in 2009.

== Club badge ==
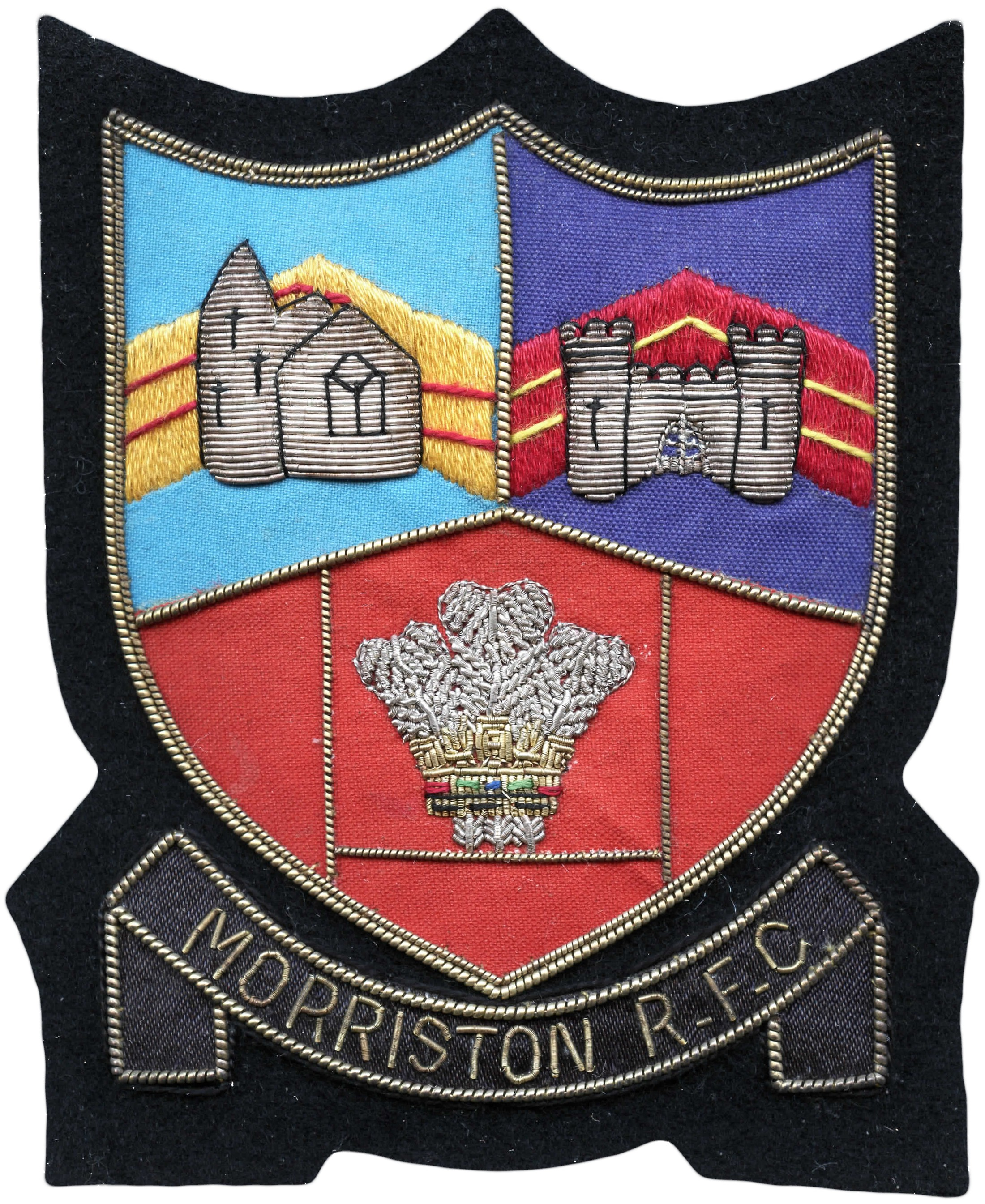
This is the original Morriston RFC Crest

The club badge is a shield split into three sections. Each third holds a symbol representing the club and the community, which are St John's Church, Castle Craig and the Prince of Wales's feathers.

== Club Honours ==
Main Team

- WRU Division 4 West - Winners 2008
- SWALEC Bowl - Winners 2008-09
- WRU Division 3 West Central A - Runners-Up 2014-15
- Brains SA Plate - Runners-Up 2014-15, 2015-16
- WRU Division 3 West Central A - Runners-Up 2015-16
- Brains SA Plate Runners-Up 2014-15, 2015-16
- Glamorgan County Silver Ball - Semi Finalist 2014-15
- Glamorgan County Presidents Cup - Winners 2023-24
- Glamorgan County Silver Ball Cup - Winners 2022-23
- WRU Division 2 - Cup Winners 2022-23

Youth Team

- Ospreys Trophy - Finalists 2021-22
- WRU Youth Leagues - Ospreys Division 1 - Champions 2002-23
- Ospreys Shield - Finalists 2002-23
- WRU Youth Leagues Ospreys Championship - Champions 2023-24
- Ospreys Bowl - Winners 2023-24

== Notable former players ==
- (Wales) Willie Arnold
- (Wales) Tom Deacon
- (Wales) Will Joseph
- (Wales) (British & Irish Lions) #124 Fred Jowett
- (Wales) (British & Irish Lions) #106 Sid Bevan
- (Wales) Harry Payne
- (Wales) Bob Thomas
- (Wales) Harold Thomas
- (Wales) Richard Moriarty
- (Wales) (United Kingdom) Paul Moriarty
- (Wales) (British & Irish Lions) #635 Tony Clement
- (Wales) (British & Irish Lions) #812 (England) Ross Moriarty
- (Wales) Niamh Terry (WRU Women)
- (Wales) Gwen Crabb (WRU Women)
- (Wales) Lauren Smyth (WRU Women)
