= Harold Thomas (rugby union, born 1883) =

Wales international rugby union footballer

- Born: Harold Howell Meredith Thomas; 17 August 1883 Swansea, Wales
- Died: 10 February 1947 (aged 63) Bournemouth, Wales

Rugby union career
- Position: Fullback
Amateur team(s)
Years	Team	Apps	(Points)
1910	Swansea RFC		
1910	Morriston RFC		
1910–1914	Llanelli FC		
International career
Years	Team	Apps	(Points)
1914	Wales	1	(2)

Harold Howell Meredith "Drummer" Thomas (17 August 1883 – 10 February 1947) was a Welsh international forward who played club rugby for Swansea and Llanelli. He won just a single cap for Wales.

== Personal history ==
Thomas was born in Swansea in 1883. He served in the Welch Regiment and after the first World War he moved to Haverfordwest. He died in 1947 in Bournemouth, England.

== Rugby career ==
Thomas came to note as a rugby player when he joined Swansea. He spent just one season for Swansea before moving to local rivals Morriston RFC. He played just a few matches for Morriston, before being picked up by Llanelli RFC. It was while at Llanelli that Thomas was selected for Wales, playing France at Rodney Parade in Newport. Although Wales won the game, it was seen as far too close a match and eight members of the Welsh team played their last Five Nations Championship game. Thomas was one of the eight dropped and never represented Wales again.

=== International matches played ===
Wales

- France 1912

== Bibliography ==
- Jenkins, John M.; Pierce, Duncan; Auty, Timothy (1991). Who's Who of Welsh International Rugby Players. Wrexham: Bridge Books. ISBN 1-872424-10-4.
- Smith, David; Williams, Gareth (1980). Fields of Praise: The Official History of The Welsh Rugby Union. Cardiff: University of Wales Press. ISBN 0-7083-0766-3.
