= 2025–26 BUCS Super Rugby season =

2025-26 is the ninth season of BUCS Super Rugby, a university rugby union competition in the United Kingdom, (not including COVID-19 Effected seasons). The ten teams remain the same from the previous season: Loughborough University, University of Bath, University of Exeter, Cardiff University, Cardiff Metropolitan University, Swansea University, Durham University, University of Nottingham, Hartpury University, & Leeds Beckett University.

The league operates with a double round robin format where each team will play the other 9 twice, once at home, and once away - making for an 18-game season. Games are start in late September and run until a mid season break in late October or early November, after 6 rounds. Another 5 matches are played before the Christmas break. In January play resumes and proceeds through February & March. Playoffs are then contested in late March & April.

Teams earn league points according to:

- 4 pts for a win
- 2 pts for a draw
- 0 pts for a loss
- 1 Try Scoring Bonus point for scoring 4 tries
- 1 Losing Bonus point for losing by 7 points or less

== Silverware and trophies ==
At the end of the regular season, the team at the top of the league table is the league champion. Teams are ranked by league points, followed by points difference (points scored in games minus points conceded), then simply points scored.

The top 8 teams from the final league standings qualify for the National Championship playoffs. This is a seeded bracket, meaning the higher up the league table teams finished the more home games and relatively easier opposition they play.

In previous seasons, the 10th placed team would enter into a playoff to determine promotion and relegation with the divisions below, but for the 2025-26 the format was altered to automatic relegation for 10th. This team is replaced by the team who wins the promotion playoff match - contested between the two league winners of Northern Premier 1 & Southern Premier 1.

A lineal trophy is also contested; The Challenge shield. The holder defends it during every home game they play. Should they lose (at home only), the visiting team takes the Challenge shield with them.

Loughborough are the defending league champions, whilst Hartpury are the defending National Champions. At the start of the season, Exeter held the Challenge Shield. During Week 7, Cardiff defeated Exeter (33-50) thus claiming the Challenge Shield for themselves. The following week (Match Week 8), Bath won away at Cardiff 14-77 to take the Challenge Shield for themselves.

=== Teams ===
University	Debut	No. of seasons*	2024-25 League Pos.	2024-25 Playoffs
Bath	2016–17	7	3rd	Quarter-Finals
Cardiff Met	2016–17	7	6th	Semi-Final
Durham	2016–17	7	4th	Quarter-Finals
Exeter#	2016–17	7	5th	Semi-Final
Hartpury†	2016–17	7	2nd	Winners
Leeds Beckett	2016–17	7	8th	Quarter-Finals
Loughborough*	2016–17	7	1st	Finalists
Cardiff	2018–19	5	9th	(Did not Qualify for Playoffs)
Swansea	2019–20	4	10th	(Won Relegation Playoffs)
Nottingham	2022–23	2	7th	Quarter-Finals

† Defending National Champions

* Defending League Champions

# Challenge Shield Holders at start of Season

== League table ==
The league table for 2025-26 is as follows:

2025–26 BUCS Super Rugby Table
Pos	Team	Pld	W	D	L	PF	PA	PD	TF	TA	TB	LB	Pts	Qualification
1	Loughborough	14	12	0	2	607	325	+282	0	0	0	0	48	Progress to the Quarter Finals
2	Bath #	0	0	0	0	0	0	0	0	0	0	0	0	Progress to the Quarter Finals
3	Exeter	15	9	0	6	557	417	+140	0	0	0	0	36	Progress to the Quarter Finals
4	Durham	15	8	0	7	395	401	−6	0	0	0	0	32	Progress to the Quarter Finals
5	Nottingham	14	7	0	7	401	455	−54	0	0	0	0	28	Progress to the Quarter Finals
6	Hartpury	15	7	0	8	434	483	−49	0	0	0	0	28	Progress to the Quarter Finals
7	Cardiff Met	15	6	0	9	368	390	−22	0	0	0	0	24	Progress to the Quarter Finals
8	Leeds Beckett	15	6	0	9	341	479	−138	0	0	0	0	24	Progress to the Quarter Finals
9	Cardiff	15	4	0	11	390	606	−216	0	0	0	0	16	
10	Swansea	14	2	0	12	282	495	−213	0	0	0	0	8	Relegation to Premier North 1 or Premier South 1

# Current Challenge Shield Holders

Quarter Finals: 1st v 8th // 2nd v 7th // 4th v 5th // 3rd v 6th
Semi Finals: 1st or 8th v 4th or 5th // 2nd or 7th v 3rd or 6th

Correct as of: 13 February 2026

=== Round-by-round ===
The table below shows each team's progression throughout the season. For each round, their cumulative points total is shown with the overall log position in brackets:

Team progression
Team	R1	R2	R3	R4	R5	R6	R7	R8	R9	R10	R11	R12	R13	R14	R15	R16	R17	R18	QF	SF	Final
Bath	21-54	42-14	12-35	35-38	54-22	43-26	38-42	14-77	36-19	21-41	29-24	14-29	39-26	18-20	56-26	17-26	40-31	7-17	48-30	36-20	41-14
Cardiff	41-7	56-28	21-43	49-24	19-54	31-24	33-50	14-77	17-16	29-31	24-21	82-14	19-28	28-34	56-26	15-45	40-41	42-40	48-30		
Cardiff Met	36-32	56-28	12-35	17-14	14-10	25-34	36-33	15-19	13-17	29-31	29-24	17-14	30-28	27-26	38-19	5-26	50-49	26-27	27-25		
Durham	27-24	26-29	21-43	17-14	45-7	43-24	38-42	33-14	56-7	24-21	24-21	32-14	29-21	27-26	26-21	38-42	14-42	7-17	21-35	36-20	
Exeter	36-32	12-41	52-28	35-38	45-7	14-33	33-50	5-29	26-42	63-33	49-40	32-14	30-28	18-20	61-28	29-19	53-40	42-40	27-25	58-48	
Hartpury†	21-54	54-36	39-27	19-60	45-21	14-33	36-33	33-14	17-16	14-19	29-36	26-35	39-26	48-26	26-21	15-45	53-40	26-27	28-25		
Leeds Beckett	27-24	42-14	33-26	40-14	45-21	31-24	24-22	5-29	13-17	21-41	19-23	26-35	29-21	12-53	61-28	5-26	40-41	19-28			
Loughborough	28-39	54-36	52-28	40-14	19-54	43-26	26-19	15-19	56-7	14-19	49-40	82-14	52-22	12-53	38-19	38-42	40-31	80-33	28-25	58-48	41-14
Nottingham	28-39	26-29	39-27	49-24	54-22	25-34	24-22	25-32	26-42	24-21	29-36	14-29	52-22	28-34	28-29	29-19	50-49	19-28	21-35		
Swansea	41-7	12-41	33-26	19-60	14-10	43-24	26-19	25-32	36-19	63-33	19-23	17-14	19-28	48-26	28-29	17-26	14-42	80-33			
Key:	Win	Draw	Loss	Bye	DNQ = Did not qualify																

^{†} Not to be confused with Hartpury University R.F.C., who play in the RFU Championship.

=== Matches ===
Home \ Away	BAT	CAR	CMT	DUR	EXE	HAR	LEE	LOU	NOT	SWA
BAT	—	56–26	29–24	38–42	35–38	39–26	42–14	40–31	54–22	36–19
CAR	14–77	—	29–31	21–43	42–40	15–45	31–24	19–54	28–34	41–7
CMT	12–35	56–28	—	27–26	30–28	26–27	13–17	15–19	50–49	14–10
DUR	7–17	24–21	17–14	—	32–14	33–14	29–21	38–42	26–29	43–24
EXE	18–20	33–50	36–32	45–7	—	53–40	61–28	52–28	26–42	63–33
HAR	21–54	17–16	36–33	26–21	14–33	—	26–35	14–19	39–27	48–26
LEE	21–41	40–41	5–26	27–24	5–29	45–21	—	12–53	19–28	33–26
LOU	43–26	82–14	38–19	56–7	49–40	54–36	40–14	—	52–22	80–33
NOT	14–29	49–24	25–34	24–21	29–19	29–36	24–22	28–39	—	28–29
SWA	17–26	19–28	17–14	14–42	12–41	19–60	19–23	26–19	25–32	—

Updated to match(es) played on 2025/26 Season. Source:

== Championship ==
The Championship competition has three rounds and typically takes place in April. It features the teams who finished in the top eight of the league.

=== Men's BUCS Super Rugby Milk Championships ===
Quarter Finals:

- 1st v 8th
- 2nd v 7th
- 4th v 5th
- 3rd v 6th

Semi Finals:

- 1st or 8th v 4th or 5th
- 2nd or 7th v 3rd or 6th

Quarterfinals
1	Bath	48
8	Cardiff	30
4	Nottingham	21
5	Durham	35
2	Loughborough	28
7	Hartpury	25
3	Exeter	27
6	Cardiff Met	25

Semifinals
Bath	36
Durham	20
Loughborough	58
Exeter	48

Finals
Bath	41
Loughborough	14

== Playoffs ==
=== Promotion Playoff ===
In Premier South 1, only 2 teams were eligible for promotion at the start of the season, one of which was Bristol. On Wednesday 28 January 2026, the only other eligible side (Brunel University) defeated Cardiff Met 2s to claim the league title. This confirms their qualification for the 2026 BUCS Super Rugby Promotion Playoff match.

On 4 February 2026 Newcastle University claimed the Premier North 1 league title to confirm their place as the second promotion playoff competitor.

As per 2025-26 format changes, the 10th placed BSR team will not defend their place in the league and will be automatically relegated.

=== National Championship Playoff ===
Upon completion of the League matches, the 8 team bracket will be set.

The National Championship Final will be played on 22 April 2026, at Rodney Parade.
