= BUCS Super Rugby =

Top division of university rugby union in the United Kingdom

- Current season, competition or edition: 2026–27 BUCS Super Rugby season
- Sport: Rugby union
- Founded: 2016
- First season: Men's – 2016–17; Women's – 2024–25
- Administrator: British Universities and Colleges Sport
- No. of teams: Men's – 10; Women's – 7
- Country: Great Britain
- Most recent champion: Hartpury
- Most titles: Men's; Hartpury (4); Women's; Cardiff Met (1)
- Level on pyramid: 1
- Relegation to: Men's; North A or South A
- Website: www.bucs.org.uk/premier-sports/super-rugby.html

BUCS Super Rugby is the highest level of men's and women's university rugby union in the United Kingdom and a potential pathway for university players into professional rugby. It comprises ten teams from universities in England and Wales. The league is named after its governing body, British Universities and Colleges Sport (BUCS).

== History ==
=== Background ===
The Scottish Varsity match between the University of St Andrews and the University of Edinburgh is the oldest varsity match in the world in a code of football, having been first played under rugby union rules in the 1860s. (Note: The Oxford-Cambridge varsity matches in rugby union and association football were first held in 1872 and 1874 respectively although intercollegiate matches in association football date back earlier. The 1869 Princeton vs. Rutgers football game was the first intercollegiate football game in the United States while the first intercollegiate rugby football game in the United States took place in 1874 when Harvard University played against McGill University.) The first Varsity Match in rugby union between the University of Oxford and University of Cambridge was contested in 1872.

Unusually for British university sporting events, the Oxford-Cambridge Varsity Match was broadcast on television, along with The Boat Race. The Independent proposed in 2008 that Bath v Loughborough was "the real varsity match" on the basis that these were the top two rugby union teams (at that time) in British Universities Sports Association (BUSA) competitions. In 2015, British Universities and Colleges Sport (BUCS), the successor to BUSA, organised fixtures between Loughborough and Durham (two of the top universities since 2011–12) to occur on the same day, which was referred to as the "BUCS Varsity".

=== Men's ===
Men's BUCS Super Rugby was launched in 2016 as a new, top level of university rugby above the existing North A and South A leagues.

The eight teams in the inaugural 2016–17 season were those who finished in the top four of the North A and South A leagues in the preceding 2015–16 season.

The league expanded to nine teams in the 2017–18 season and ten teams in the 2018–19 season.

=== Women's ===
Women's BUCS Super Rugby was launched ahead of the 2024–25 season.

The seven-team competition is a positive evolution of the Women's National League (WNL) and joins the top level of Men's rugby union as BUCS' second 'Super' level of competition. Women's BUCS Super Rugby will provide an enhanced platform to aid female players at institutions in England, Wales, and Scotland in developing their game while pursuing higher education.

On 12 February 2025 Brunel University's Women secured their place in Women's BUCS Super Rugby (WBSR), for the first time in their history, defeating Newcastle 64–8 in the BSR North vs South Prem Playoff.

== Men's BUCS Super Rugby ==
University	Debut	No. of seasons*
Bath	2016–17	7
Cardiff	2018–19	5
Cardiff Met	2016–17	7
Durham	2016–17	7
Exeter	2016–17	7
Hartpury†	2016–17	7
Leeds Beckett	2016–17	7
Loughborough	2016–17	7
Nottingham	2022–23	2
Swansea	2019–20	4

* Excluding the 2020–21 season, which was cancelled due to the COVID-19 pandemic in the United Kingdom.

^{†} Not to be confused with Hartpury University R.F.C., who play in the RFU Championship.

Locations of BUCS Super Rugby teams
Locations of BUCS Super Rugby teams in Cardiff

=== Season structure ===
The season has three phases:

- League – a double round-robin tournament, where teams play each other home and away.
- Championship – a knockout tournament featuring the top eight teams from the League.
- Playoff – a knockout tournament featuring the team at the bottom of the League and the teams at the top of North A and South A leagues. The Playoff determines whether relegation and promotion occur.

=== League ===
The League season currently has 18 rounds and typically runs from September to March. League points are awarded in the following way:

- 4 points for winning a match
- 2 points for drawing a match
- 0 points for losing a match
- 1 losing bonus point for losing by 7 points (or less)
- 1 try bonus point for scoring (at least) 4 tries, regardless of the outcome.

In this points system winning teams get 4 or 5 points, drawing teams 2 or 3 points, and losing teams between 0 and 2 points.

=== Championship ===
The Championship competition has three rounds and typically takes place in April. It features the teams who finished in the top eight of the league.

==== Men's BUCS Super Rugby Milk Championships ====
Quarter Finals:

- 1st v 8th
- 2nd v 7th
- 4th v 5th
- 3rd v 6th

Semi Finals:

- 1st or 8th v 4th or 5th
- 2nd or 7th v 3rd or 6th

Quarterfinals
1
8
4
5
2
7
3
6

Semifinals

Finals

=== Playoff ===
The team that finishes last in the league is not automatically relegated. Relegation from (and promotion to) BUCS Super Rugby is decided through a playoff in the format of a three-team, single-elimination tournament.

The playoff begins with a semi-final between the winners of the North A and South A leagues. The bottom placed BUCS Super Rugby team has a bye directly into the playoff game. The winner of the playoff game is the team that plays in the next season of BUCS Super Rugby. The home team in each game is decided by coin toss.

North vs South Playoff	BUCS Super Rugby Playoff
	Bottom placed team in BUCS Super Rugby
North A champions	Winner of North vs South Playoff
South A champions

==== 2025–26 Playoff Changes ====
In August 2025, BUCS announced that from the 2025–26 Season the 10th placed team at the end of the season would be automatically relegated without a playoff. Their place would be taken by the winner of the Premier North vs Premier South playoff.

=== Playoff results ===
Season	Game	(gold) Winner	Score!	(silver) Runner-up	Venue	Promoted	Attendance	Ref	Highlights
Men's BUCS Super Rugby
2016–17	Game 1 – 2017-04-05	Nottingham Trent University	57–0	Bristol University		Nottingham Trent University			
2016–17	Game 2 – 2017-04-12	Nottingham Trent University	65–12	Bristol University		Nottingham Trent University			
2017–18	Game 1 – 2018-03-07	Cardiff University	59–17	Newcastle University		Cardiff University			
2017–18	Game 2 – 2018-03-14	Cardiff University	28–17	Newcastle University		Cardiff University			
2018–19	Prem Semi-Final – 2019-04-03	Swansea University	27–18	Newcastle University					
2018–19	BSR Playoff – 2019-04-10	Swansea University	32–28	Nottingham Trent University		Swansea University			
2019–20	Prem Semi-Final – 2020-04-01	Nottingham Trent University	N/A	Bristol University	Season interrupted by COVID-19				
2019–20	BSR Playoff – 2020-04-08	Semi-Final Winner	N/A	Northumbria University	Season interrupted by COVID-19				
2020–21	Season interrupted by COVID-19								
2021–22	No Semi-Final								
2021–22	BSR Playoff – 2022-04-13	Nottingham University	22–28	Northumbria University		'Nottingham University			
2022–23	Prem Semi-Final – 2023-03-29	Brunel University	26–18	Newcastle University					
2022–23	BSR Playoff – 2023-04-12	Leeds Beckett University	23–17	Brunel University		Leeds Beckett University			
2023–24	Prem Semi-Final – 2024-03-27	Newcastle University	39–24	Brunel University					
2023–24	BSR Playoff – 2024-04-10	Swansea University	40–17	Newcastle University		Swansea University			
2024–25	Prem Semi-Final – 2025-03-26	Brunel University	30–29	Newcastle University					
2024–25	BSR Playoff – 2025-04-09	Swansea University	19–15	Brunel University		Swansea University			
End of BSR Relegation Play Off
2025–26	Prem North/South Promotion Playoff –	Newcastle	25–29	Brunel		Brunel University			
2026–27	Prem North/South Promotion Playoff –								
2027–28	Prem North/South Promotion Playoff –								

Gold background University that has been promoted to Men's BUCS Super Rugby.
Cyan background Men's BUCS Super Rugby University that has successfully defended their place in the league after the Playoffs.
Red background Playoff campaign was not completed due to suspension of competition due to Covid-19 Pandemic.

=== Results ===
==== League and championship ====
Final position	Season	Season	Season	Season	Season	Season	Season	Season	Season
Final position	2016–17	2017–18	2018–19	2019–20*	2021–22	2022–23	2023–24	2024–25	2025–26
1	Hartpury (CH)	Exeter	Exeter (SF)	Durham	Durham (RU)	Loughborough (RU)	Exeter (RU)	Loughborough (RU)	Bath
2	Exeter (RU)	Northumbria	Hartpury (CH)	Exeter	Exeter (CH)	Exeter (CH)	Loughborough (CH)	Hartpury (CH)	Loughborough
3	Loughborough (SF)	Cardiff Met (RU)	Bath (SF)	Leeds Beckett	Cardiff Met (SF)	Durham	Hartpury (SF)	Bath	Exeter
4	Durham	Leeds Beckett (SF)	Cardiff Met	Cardiff Met	Loughborough (SF)	Bath (SF)	Durham	Durham	Nottingham
5	Bath (SF)	Hartpury (CH)	Leeds Beckett (RU)	Hartpury	Swansea	Hartpury	Bath (SF)	Exeter (SF)	Durham
6	Northumbria	Loughborough	Northumbria	Loughborough	Cardiff	Cardiff (SF)	Cardiff Met	Cardiff Met (SF)	Cardiff Met
7	Cardiff Met	Bath (SF)	Durham	Swansea	Hartpury	Cardiff Met	Leeds Beckett	Nottingham	Hartpury
8	Leeds Beckett	Durham	Cardiff	Bath	Leeds Beckett	Nottingham	Nottingham	Leeds Beckett	Cardiff
9	–	Nottingham Trent	Loughborough	Cardiff	Bath	Swansea	Cardiff	Cardiff	Leeds Beckett
10	–	–	Nottingham Trent (R)	Northumbria	Northumbria (R)	Leeds Beckett	Swansea	Swansea	Swansea (R)

Final position	Season	Season	Season
Final position	2026–27	2027–28	2028–29
1	Bath		
2	Brunel		
3	Cardiff		
4	Cardiff Met		
5	Durham		
6	Hartpury		
7	Hartpury		
8	Leeds Beckett		
9	Loughborough		
10	Nottingham		

Green background (rows 1 to 8) are teams that progressed to the Championship tournament.
Red background is a team that was relegated after losing a playoff to a North A / South A team.
(CH) Champions. (RU) Runners-up. (SF) Losing semi-finalists. (R) Relegated
* No Championship tournament was held in 2020 because of the COVID-19 pandemic.

==== Championship finals ====
Season	(gold) Champion	Score	(silver) Runner-up	Venue	Attendance	Ref	Highlights	Title
Pre-Men's BUCS Super Rugby
2012–13	Durham University	26–17	Cardiff Met	Twickenham				
2013–14	Hartpury University	28–24	Leeds Met	Twickenham				
2014–15	Leeds Beckett	31–23	Loughborough	Twickenham				
2015–16	Exeter University	21–19	Loughborough	Twickenham				
Men's BUCS Super Rugby
2016–17	Hartpury University	27–24	Exeter University	Twickenham				
2017–18	Hartpury University	27–24	Cardiff Met	Twickenham				
2018–19	Hartpury University	45–27	Leeds Beckett	Twickenham				
2019–20	Season interrupted by COVID-19							
2020–21	Season interrupted by COVID-19							
2021–22	Exeter University	14–13	Durham University	Sixways Stadium				
2022–23	Exeter University	48–44	Loughborough	StoneX Stadium				
2023–24	Loughborough	35–31	Exeter University	StoneX Stadium				
2024–25	Hartpury University	35–31	Loughborough	Rodney Parade				
2025–26	Bath	41–14	Loughborough	Rodney Parade				
2026–27				Rodney Parade				
2027–28				Rodney Parade				

=== Promotion and relegation ===
Season	Club promoted at start of season	Promoted from	Club relegated at end of season	Relegated to
2017–18	Nottingham Trent	BUCS North A	None	N/A
2018–19	Cardiff	BUCS South A	Nottingham Trent	BUCS North A
2019–20	Swansea	BUCS South A	None	N/A
2020–21	Season cancelled due to COVID-19			
2021–22	None	N/A	Northumbria	BUCS North A
2022–23	Nottingham	BUCS North A	None	N/A
2023–24	None	N/A	None	N/A
2024–25	None	N/A	None	N/A
2025–26	None	N/A		
2026–27	Brunel	Premier South 1	Swansea	Premier South 1
2027–28				

=== Alumni with international caps ===
The inclusion criteria are that the player played in a senior international test after playing in BUCS Super Rugby.

Player	Year of first international cap	University	Year of last BUCS Super Rugby appearance
(Italy) Enoch Opoku-Gyamfi	2025	University of Bath	2025
(England) Max Ojomoh	2025	University of Bath	2025
(United States) Tom Pittman	2024	University of Bath	2021
(Wales) Archie Griffin	2024	University of Bath	2024
(Italy) Ross Vintcent	2024	University of Exeter	2023
(Wales) Dafydd Jenkins	2022	University of Exeter	2022
(France) Thibaud Flament	2021	Loughborough University	2019
(Wales) Christ Tshiunza	2021	University of Exeter	2021
(Wales) Ben Thomas	2021	Cardiff University	2018
(England) Dan Kelly	2021	Loughborough University	2020
(England) Alex Dombrandt	2021	Cardiff Metropolitan University	2018
(England) Freddie Steward	2021	Loughborough University	2019
(England) Harry Randall	2021	Hartpury College	2018
(Italy) Stephen Varney	2020	Hartpury College	2019
(Scotland) Sam Skinner	2018	University of Exeter	2016
(Italy) Sebastian Negri	2016	Hartpury College	2017

=== Place in the BUCS Rugby Union pyramid ===
BUCS Super Rugby is the top division of men's university rugby in Britain. It sits in the Premier tier of the BUCS Rugby Union pyramid, along with North A, North B, South A and South B.

Premier	BUCS Super Rugby										
Premier	North 1					South 1					
Premier	North 2					South 2					
Tier 1	Scottish 1A		Northern 1A		Midlands 1A		Western 1A		South Eastern 1A		
Tier 2	Scottish 2A		Northern 2A	Northern 2B	Midlands 2A	Midlands 2B	Western 2A	Western 2B	South Eastern 2A		South Eastern 2B
Tier 3	Scottish 3A		Northern 3A	Northern 3B	Midlands 3A	Midlands 3B	Western 3A	Western 3B	South Eastern 3A		South Eastern 3B
Tier 4	Scottish 4A	Scottish 4B	Northern 4A	Northern 4B	Midlands 4A	Midlands 4B	Western 4A	Western 4B	South Eastern 4A	South Eastern 4C	South Eastern 4B
Tier 5			Northern 5A	Northern 5B	Midlands 5A		Western 5A		South Eastern 5A		South Eastern 5B
Tier 6									South Eastern 6A		

== Women's BUCS Super Rugby ==
Club	University	First season in league	Last season in league	Total number of seasons in league*
Brunel	Brunel University	2025–26		1
Cardiff	Cardiff University	2024–25		2
Cardiff Met	Cardiff Metropolitan University	2024–25		2
Durham	Durham University	2024–25	2024–25	1
Edinburgh	Edinburgh University	2024–25		2
Exeter	University of Exeter	2024–25		2
Hartpury	Hartpury University	2024–25		2
Loughborough	Loughborough University	2024–25		2

* Excludes the 2020–21 season, which was cancelled due to Covid-19.

Locations of BUCS Super Rugby teams
Locations of BUCS Super Rugby teams in Cardiff

=== Season structure ===
The season has three phases:

- League – a double round-robin tournament, where teams play each other home and away.
- Championship – a knockout tournament featuring the top eight teams from the League.
- Playoff – a knockout tournament featuring the team at the bottom of the League and the teams at the top of North A and South A leagues. The Playoff determines whether relegation and promotion occur.

=== League ===
The league season currently has 14 rounds and typically runs from September to March. League points are awarded in the following way:

- 4 points for winning a match
- 2 points for drawing a match
- 0 points for losing a match
- 1 losing bonus point for losing by 7 points (or less)
- 1 try bonus point for scoring (at least) 4 tries, regardless of the outcome.

In this points system winning teams get 4 or 5 points, drawing teams 2 or 3 points, and losing teams between 0 and 2 points.

=== Championship ===
The Championship competition has three rounds and typically takes place in April. It features the teams that finished in the top six of the league. The top two places are awarded a bye into the semi-finals.

==== Women's BUCS Super Rugby Milk Championships ====
Quarter Finals:

- 1st – BYE
- 2nd – BYE
- 4th v 5th
- 3rd v 6th

Semi Finals:

- 1st v 4th or 5th
- 2nd v 3rd or 6th

Quarterfinals
1	BYE
4
5
2	BYE
3
6

Semifinals

Finals

=== Results ===
==== League and championship ====
Final position	Season	Season	Season	Season
Final position	2024–25	2025–26	2026–27	2027–28
1	Hartpury (SF)	Hartpury (SF)	Brunel	
2	Exeter (SF)	Loughborough (CH)	Cardiff	
3	Loughborough (RU)	Exeter (SF)	Cardiff Met	
4	Edinburgh	Cardiff Met	Edinburgh	
5	Cardiff Met (CH)	Brunel (RU)	Exeter	
6	Cardiff	Edinburgh	Hartpury	
7	Durham	Cardiff	Loughborough	
8	–	–	–	

Green background (rows 1 to 6) are teams that progressed to the Championship tournament.
(CH) Champions. (RU) Runners-up. (SF) Losing semi-finalists.

==== Championship finals ====
Season	(gold) Champion	Score	(silver) Runner-up	Venue	Attendance	Ref	Highlights	Title
Pre-Women's National League
2013–14	Cardiff Met	47–0	Leeds Met	Twickenham				
2014–15	Gloucestershire	28–12	Cardiff Met	Twickenham				
2015–16	Cardiff Met	20–5	Northumbria	Twickenham				
2016–17	Edinburgh University	48–5	Northumbria	Twickenham				
2017–18	Exeter University	35–32	Hartpury University	Twickenham				
2018–19	Exeter University	30–26	Durham University	Twickenham				
2019–20	Season interrupted by COVID-19							
2020–21	Season interrupted by COVID-19							
Women's National League
2021–22	Hartpury University	36–22	Edinburgh University	Sixways Stadium				
2022–23	Hartpury University	45–12	Exeter University	StoneX Stadium				
2023–24	Hartpury University	34–22	Loughborough	StoneX Stadium				
Women's BUCS Super Rugby
2024–25	Cardiff Met	30–29	Loughborough	Rodney Parade				
2025–26	Loughborough	45–5	Brunel	Rodney Parade				

=== Place in the BUCS Rugby Union pyramid ===
BUCS Super Rugby is the top division of women's university rugby in Britain. It sits in the Premier tier of the BUCS Rugby Union pyramid, along with Premier North and South.

Premier	BUCS Super Rugby							
Premier	North				South			
Tier 1	Scottish 1	Northern 1		Midlands 1		Western 1	South Eastern 1	
Tier 2	Scottish 2	Northern 2		Midlands 2		Western 2	South Eastern 2	
Tier 3		Northern 3A	Northern 3B	Midlands 3A	Midlands 3B		South Eastern 3A	South Eastern 3B

== University Celestial 7s ==
The competition consists of more than 50 male and female university teams, including up to 1,000 players. With five active competitions on the day played across seven pitches at The Richmond Athletics Ground, the home of Richmond RFC, Universities go to battle.

The inaugural competition takes place on Friday 13 June 2025.

=== Competitions ===
==== Men’s and Women’s Championship ====
The Championships are open to Super Rugby and North/South Premier sides.

Season	(gold) Men's Champion	(gold) Women's Champion	Venue
2025	Exeter University	Loughborough University	Richmond Athletic Ground

==== Men’s and Women's Trophy ====
The Trophy is open to all other BUCS sides competing across the leagues.

Season	(gold) Men's Champion	(gold) Women's Champion	Venue
2025	Loughborough University 2s	Exeter University	Richmond Athletic Ground

==== The Capital Cup ====
The Capital Cup is for BUSC institutions in London.

Season	(gold) Men's Champion	Venue
2025	Imperial College London	Richmond Athletic Ground

== Media coverage ==
Some BUCS Super Rugby matches are streamed live on the BUCS Super Rugby YouTube channel, which provides full match livestreams, highlights, and end-of-season montages for both men's and women's competitions. In the 2018–19 season, some men's matches were broadcast on FreeSports. Coverage has grown significantly since the league's inception in 2016, evolving from limited broadcasts to comprehensive digital streaming that attracts thousands of viewers and supports the pathway for over 100 players to professional contracts in leagues such as the Premiership Rugby and United Rugby Championship. Central to this development are commentators Joe Byrnes and Dave Rogers, who have provided presentation and commentary for BUCS Super Rugby fixtures since its formation, including lead broadcasts of finals at Twickenham Stadium. Byrnes, a sports presenter and MC, is often joined on Wednesdays by university students for punditry duties, fostering engagement and development opportunities for aspiring broadcasters within the student community. Additionally, Cardiff Metropolitan University's student-led media outlet, Cardiff Met TV, hosts livestreams and highlights of Cardiff Met's home matches in both the men's and women's BUCS Super Rugby competitions, contributing to grassroots coverage and accessibility.

== See also ==
- Rugby union in England
- Rugby union in Scotland
- Rugby union in Wales
- Varsity Rugby (South Africa)
