= Trewyddfa =

Hill and hamlet in Swansea, Wales

Graig Trewyddfa (English: Trewyddfa rock) is a hill and small community in Swansea, Wales. It falls within the Morriston electoral ward.

The area is most notable for Morris Castle, the ruins of a late 18th-century block of workers' housing built on one of the higher hills in the city.

Also in the area is a local park named Llywelyn Park, containing a few acres of open space, and a bowling green as well as two playgrounds and a tennis court.
