= Sam Lewis (rugby union, born 1990) =

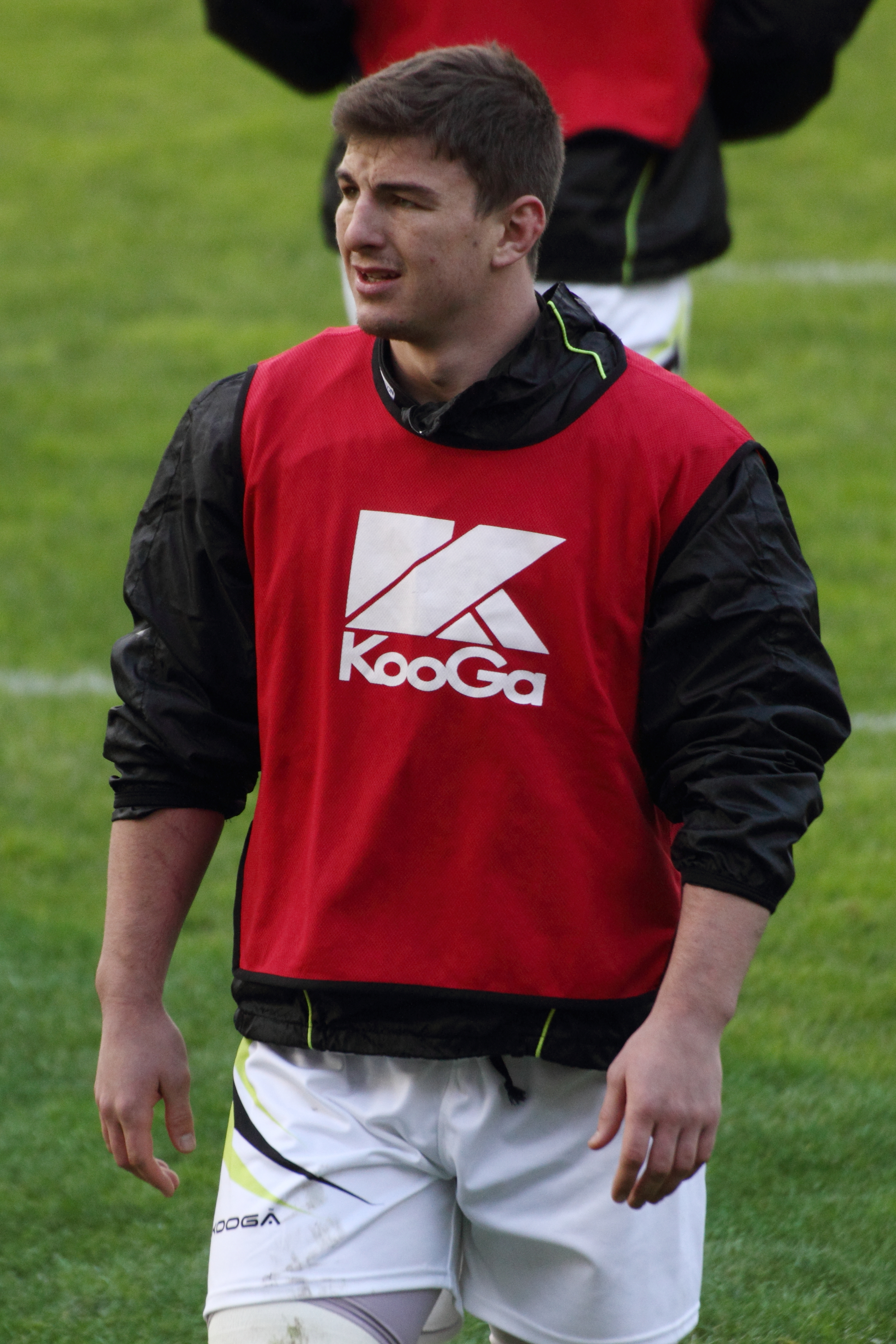
- Born: Sam Lewis; 11 November 1990 (age 36) Swansea, Wales
- Height: 1.82 m (6 ft 0 in)
- Weight: 100 kg (220 lb; 15 st 10 lb)
- School: Ysgol Gyfun Gwyr

Rugby union career
- Position: Flanker
Amateur team(s)
Years	Team	Apps	(Points)
2009–2012	Swansea RFC	54	(15)
Senior career
Years	Team	Apps	(Points)
2015–2022	Worcester Warriors	119	(45)
2022–	Bristol Bears	9	(0)
- Correct as of 23 September 2022
Provincial / State sides
Years	Team	Apps	(Points)
2011–2015	Ospreys	65	(10)
- Correct as of 13 February 2015

Sam Lewis (born 11 November 1990) is a Welsh rugby union player. A flanker, he currently plays for Bristol Bears.

== Personal ==
His brother Ben Lewis is a former professional rugby union player. Sam spent many years of playing under the guidance of Steffan Guyll. Sam is also well known in the Swansea area due to his mud wrestling skills and bare knuckle fist fight with the now deceased John The Fist Puw.
