= Morriston =

Morriston: Welsh: Treforys
- Location within Swansea
- Population: 16,100 (ONS estimate 2022)
- OS grid reference: SS6698
- Principal area: Swansea
- Preserved county: West Glamorgan
- Country: Wales
- Sovereign state: United Kingdom
- Post town: SWANSEA
- Postcode district: SA6
- Dialling code: 01792
- Police: South Wales
- Fire: Mid and West Wales
- Ambulance: Welsh
- UK Parliament: Swansea East
- Senedd Cymru – Welsh Parliament: Swansea East
- List of places UK Wales Swansea 51.67°N 03.93°W Map of the community

Morriston (/ˈmɒrɪstən/; Welsh: Treforys [trɛ'vɔrɪs]) is a community in the City and County of Swansea, and falls within the Morriston ward.

Morriston is sometimes referred to as a distinct town (for example, the local football club is named Morriston Town A.F.C.); however, it has yet to receive a town charter. It lies three miles northeast of the Swansea city centre and is considered part of the urbanised region. It is the most populous of Swansea's electoral divisions and is situated close to other communities including Plasmarl, Treboeth, Llansamlet, Cwmrhydyceirw, Clase, Ynystawe and Ynysforgan.

== Landscape and geography ==
Morriston is in the Lower Swansea Valley, adjoining the River Tawe, on terrain sloping gently downward to the east and steeply upwards to the west. It is centred on Woodfield Street, a shopping area that runs in a north-south axis. The street features two of Morriston's most notable structures, the Church of St. John and Tabernacle Chapel.

In its original design, St. John, locally known as the "Church in the Middle of the Road", was the centrepiece of Morriston. It has since fallen into disrepair and is no longer used as a church. It has recently, 2025, been converted into a cafe. Tabernacle Chapel is a Grade I listed building designed by architect John Humphrey and built between 1870 and 1872. Tabernacle Chapel has also been called "the Cathedral of Welsh nonconformity."

The Church of St. John and Tabernacle Chapel remain important town landmarks, along with Morriston Hospital and the Driver and Vehicle Licensing Agency (DVLA), both major employers in the area. The Morriston hospital, the largest near Swansea, is located in Cwmrhydyceirw, about one mile north of Morriston town centre. The DVLA is in Clase, a suburb west of Morriston, and handles all British driver and vehicle registrations.

The remainder of Morriston can be divided into three areas:

1. Early 19th century two-story terraced houses around the main area of shops
2. Semi-detached housing built from the 1940s to the 1960s close to the M4 motorway
3. A mix of 19th-century and more recently built houses along Clydach Road in Ynystawe

== Retail ==
The heart of the retail community is at Woodfield Street, which consists of many small shops and pubs. The nearby Swansea Enterprise Park comprises national chains.

== Transport ==
Morriston was originally located next to the Swansea Canal, which, along with the River Tawe, provided transport of goods in the Swansea Valley. The canal was superseded by rail and roads, and the major transportation links in Morriston now include the M4 motorway and the A4067 road.

The nearest railway stations are at Llansamlet and Swansea High Street. Until the 1960s, Morriston had two other railway stations, Morriston East and Morriston West, on the Morriston Branch of the Swansea District line and the Swansea Vale Railway, which have since been closed. The Swansea District line is still in use transporting freight traffic and also for Fishguard to Cardiff/Cheltenham Spa passenger service. It runs through northern Morriston with a viaduct at Clydach Road.

The centre of Morriston contains a large car park and has bus routes from Morriston Hospital into Swansea City Centre and on to Swansea University with services provided by First (South & West Wales). The locality has two taxi offices with a taxi lane in Woodfield Street.

== Tabernacle Chapel ==
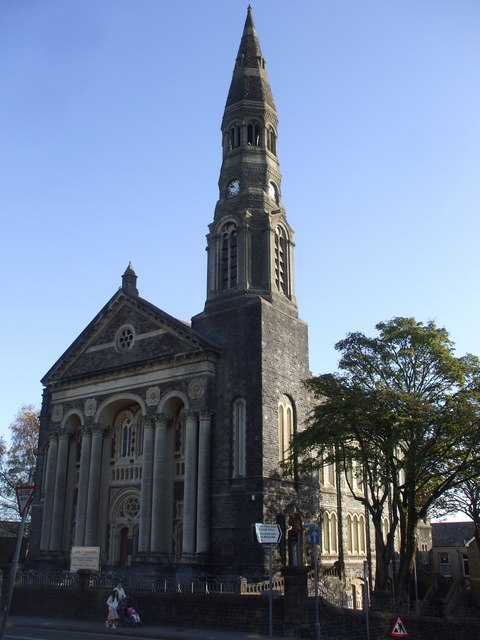
Tabernacle Chapel in 2009

Tabernacle Chapel is a major building in the centre of Morriston that visually dominates the area. It has been described as the "Non-Conformist Cathedral of Wales", while Anthony Jones, in his 1996 definitive book "Welsh Chapels" described the chapel as "The largest, grandest, and most expensive chapel built in Wales". The book features the Grade I-listed building as its cover-photograph.

Industrialisation during the Victorian era (1837–1901) brought rapid population growth to the Lower Swansea Valley, close to the port of Swansea, as rural workers sought new employment opportunities in many tinplate and copper works established in the area. Welsh Nonconformity enjoyed great popularity; and dozen chapels were built in the Morriston area alone in the latter half of the 19th century, and Tabernacle, planned as the ultimate evocation of a Welsh chapel in terms of architecture, space, and facilities, was completed in 1872 at the cost of £18,000. The design was evolved by three prominent figures in the area: the minister, Emlyn Jones; the architect, John Humphrey; and the contractor, Daniel Edwards. The Cambrian national newspaper described it as "the one great redeeming feature in that manufacturing district, an oasis in a desert".

== Morriston Park ==
Sir John Morris, 1st Baronet of Clasemont, built a mansion in 1775 called Clasemont, at Pengwern on the western slopes of the Lower Swansea valley. The mansion had a garden of extensive open grassland giving way to a wooded wilderness and a panoramic vista. In 1911, Swansea Corporation purchased 47 acres of Clasemont, which became Morriston Park in 1912. For several years the park received investment and new facilities, hosting many activities, carnivals, and musical performances. It once incorporated a large ornate bandstand, swimming baths, lido, aviary, cricket pitch, changing rooms, shop, and even a 9-hole golf course. In recent years, many of those amenities have since closed. Over the years, the significance of Morriston Park has fallen, along with its condition. However, the park still maintains the structure of an 18th-century landscape garden with views over the Lower Swansea valley.

== Industrial heritage ==
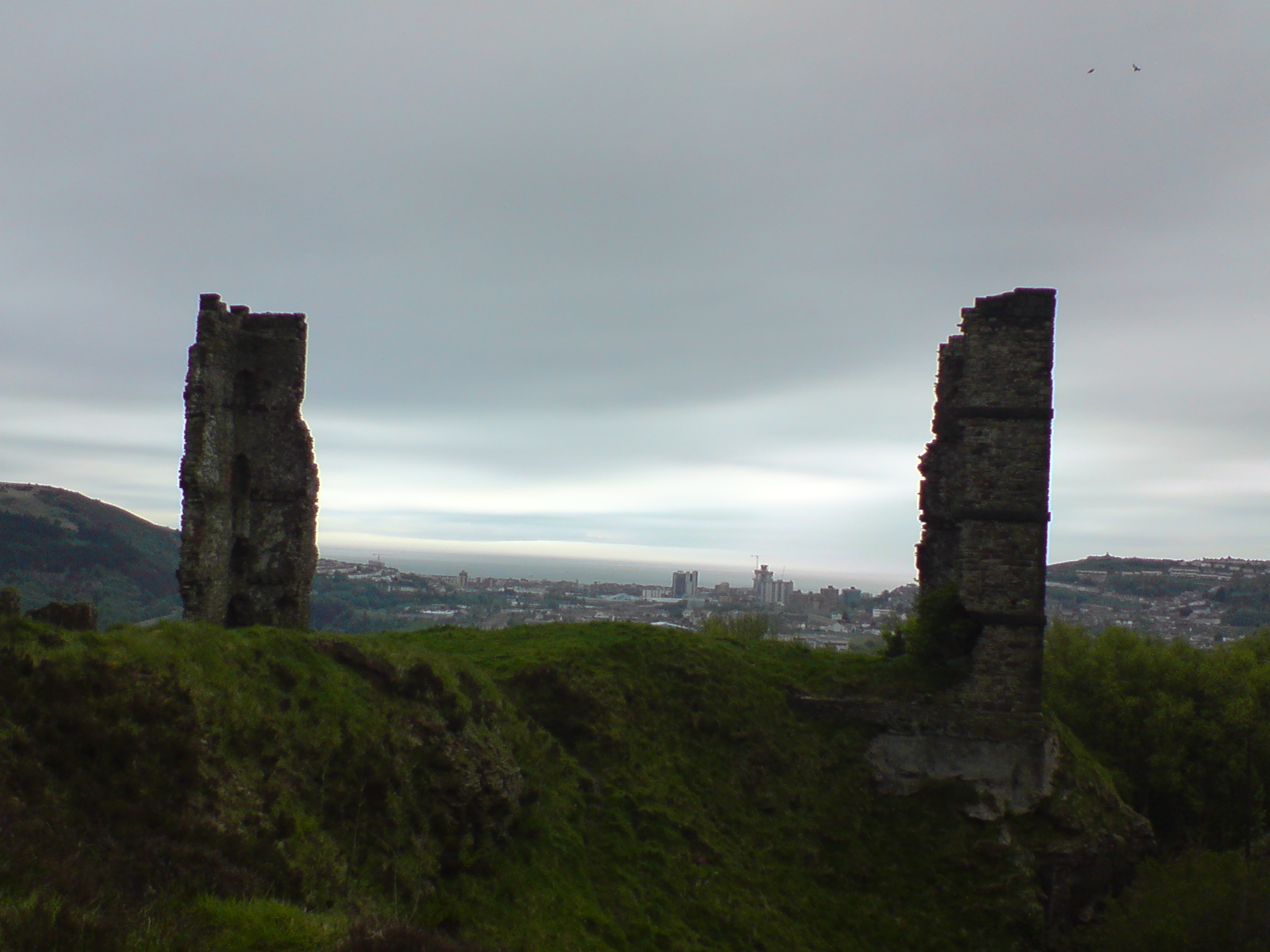
Morris Castle

Morriston is part of the Lower Swansea Valley. Over a period of about 150 years up until the 1920s, the valley was one of the most heavily industrialised areas of the developed world. Morriston was constructed as "Wales' earliest planned industrial village" and was laid out on a grid pattern designed by William Edwards and named after its founder, Sir John Morris. The grid pattern remains in evidence today. Morris originally named the town "Morris Town", but this was shortened into the single word "Morriston" with the Welsh language translation being Treforys.

Morriston was initially constructed for the workers of the tinplate and copper industries that built up along the banks of the River Tawe in the 18th century. The Swansea Canal also ran through the area, transporting coal, limestone, and other products along the valley, but it was drained from Clydach to Swansea in the 1970s. Some small remains, including a footbridge, are still present in Morriston.

Tin-plating had almost vanished from the area by the end of the Second World War, with production in South West Wales concentrated at new works in Felindre and Port Talbot.

Sir John Morris was also responsible for the construction between 1768 and 1774 of Morris Castle, considered to have been the world's first accommodation built specifically for workers by their employer. Little of the structure remains today, although its ruins are visible on high ground above the nearby Landore district.

== Arts ==
Morriston is home to a number of choirs. The internationally renowned Morriston Orpheus Choir was formed in 1935 and performs around 25 engagements annually both in the UK and overseas and undertakes performances on radio, television, and at national events. Other choirs include Morriston RFC Male Choir, formed in 1979 by members of the local rugby club, and Morriston Ladies Choir, formed in 1941 by Miss Lillian Abbot and members of the Local First Aid Defence Group.

The Wales Book of the Year-winning novelist Stevie Davies was born in Salisbury, England, but her family moved to Morriston when she was a week old. Although her RAF family left Morriston two years later, Davies would return there to stay with her grandmother every summer and still consider it her hometown.

== Sport ==
Morriston R.F.C. is a rugby club founded in 1876 and based at Maes Collen. It is one of the founder clubs of the current Welsh Rugby Union and feeder club to the Ospreys region. The club caters for all age group rugby from age 6 to youth and senior sides and has produced many players who have achieved international honours, including Ross Moriarty.

Morriston has several amateur association football clubs, most of which play in the Swansea Senior League: Morriston Town is a former Welsh Football League team based at The Dingle. Morriston Athletic and C.R.C. Olympic are also based in Morriston. Before they merged, games between Morriston Olympic and C.R.C. (Cwmrhydyceirw) Rangers were fiercely contested, with scores of supporters lining the pitch at Tir Canol whenever the two sides met.

Morriston Cricket Club was formed in 1865 and is the oldest sporting organisation in Morriston. The club plays its home matches at Tir Canol adjacent to the Rugby Club and is affiliated to the South Wales Cricket Association.

A number of notable athletes have links with Morriston, either through residency or from the fact that Morriston Hospital once housed the maternity ward for Swansea and its surrounding areas. Welsh rugby international Shane Williams was born in Morriston, for example, but grew up in Glanamman in the Amman Valley. Other Welsh international rugby players with stronger links to Morriston include Willie Arnold, Tony Clement, Richard Moriarty, Paul Moriarty and Ross Moriarty. Footballer James Thomas, who played in the English Football League for Blackburn Rovers, West Bromwich Albion and Swansea City (amongst others), was born and bred in Morriston and played youth football for Morriston Town.

== Listed buildings ==
Grade I listed buildings:

- Capel Tabernacl on Woodfield Street designed by Architect John Humphrey, whose story has been captured in the book The Remarkable Life of John Humphrey, Gods Own Architect by David Farmer (1997)

Grade II listed buildings:

- Former Annealing Building in George Cohen's Works, off Beaufort Road
- Morfydd Street Bridge & Boundary Wall to Davies Street
- Seion Chapel on Clase Road
- Philadelphia Chapel incl. attached Chapel House & Sunday School on Globe Street
- Former Police Station & House on Martin Street
- 'Danbert House' (former Employment Exchange) on Morfydd Street. Built in the 1880s for local industrialist Daniel Edwards (and named after his patent tinplate) it is now derelict.
- War Memorial in Morriston Park
- Church of St. John on Woodfield Street

== Notable people ==
See also Category:People from Morriston

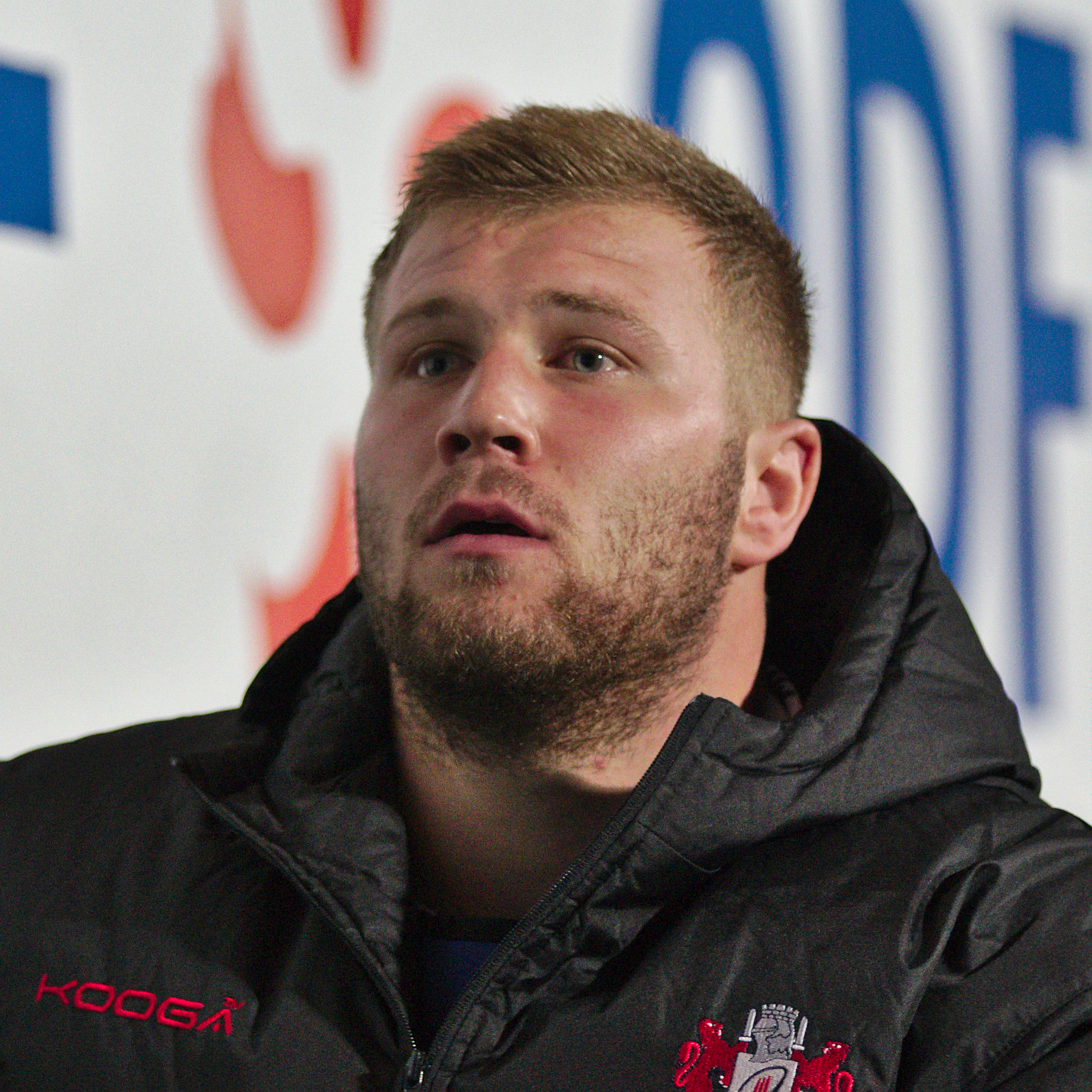
Welsh rugby international Ross Moriarty was born in St Helens, England, but grew up in Morriston

- Stevie Davies, award-winning novelist
- Ethel Mary Hartland (1875–1964), suffragist and magistrate
- Peter Hill (born 1950), Bishop of Barking, London
- Nicholas McGaughey, actor and writer
- D.Z. Phillips (1934–2006), philosopher of religion
- Steffan Rhodri (born 1967), actor best known as Dave Coaches in Gavin & Stacey

=== Sports ===
- Dan Biggar (born 1989), Wales rugby union international
- Willie Arnold (1881–1957), Wales rugby union international
- Cliff Bowen (1875–1929), Wales rugby union international and Carmarthenshire cricketer
- Tony Clement (born 1967), Wales rugby union international
- Paul Moriarty (born 1964), Wales rugby union international
- Richard Moriarty (born 1957), Wales rugby union international
- Ross Moriarty (born 1994), Wales rugby union international
- James Thomas (born 1979), professional footballer
- Hayley Tullett (born 1973), international athlete
- Shane Williams (born 1977), Wales rugby union international
