= Ynysforgan =

Coordinates: 51.678°N 3.914°W

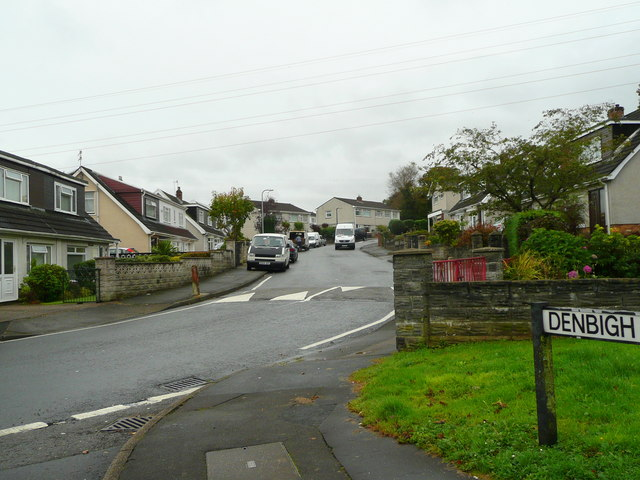
Christopher Road, Ynysforgan, Morriston

Ynysforgan is a village in Swansea, Wales, between Morriston and Ynystawe, just off junction 45 of the M4 motorway

The origins of its name are not known but ynys is Welsh for a river-meadow (i.e., an "island" – the main meaning of ynys – in otherwise marshier ground beside a river) and Forgan is a mutation of the name Morgan; a reasonable translation of the name would therefore be Morgan's Meadow. The River Tawe flows past Ynysforgan so it is not unreasonable to speculate that it is the river in question. Several other nearby locations also use the term Ynys in their names including Ynystawe (the neighbouring village to Ynysforgan), Ynystanglws Farm (near Ynystawe), and Ynysmeudwy (near Pontardawe).

However, as historically insignificant as Ynysforgan may seem it holds a hidden gem unknown to most locals and has its name embedded in the annals of Welsh time. In the latter part of the Middle Ages (circa 1330 - 1403) Ynysforgan was the home of Hopcyn ap Tomas ab Einion. This clearly indicates the name Ynysforgan extends back further than the 15th century and given the 'modernisation' of language it's conceivable its name is derived from old Welsh. Historians have speculated that ab Einion was responsible for a manuscript titled the Red Book of Hergest which is one of the most important medieval Welsh language manuscripts. Furthermore, in 1403 ab Einion was summoned to Carmarthen by none other than Owain Glyndŵr, the last true Prince of Wales to shed light on his fate by bringing his knowledge and expertise to bare by interpreting old bardic prophecies.

Before 1963 Ynysforgan essentially comprised the main Swansea to Brecon road (now Clydach Road) with houses on either side. The 1911 census shows the address as 'Clydack Road'. The 'newer' houses behind Clydach Road were built in late 1960 starting with Garth View, followed by Elizabeth Close, Ian's Walk and Orpheus Road. The builders name was Emrys Davies of Neath who was a sole trader employing skilled tradesmen. It is believed that the road names Elizabeth Close, Ian's Walk and Andrews Crescent are attributable to Mr Davies' relatives. Garth View takes its name from its aspect facing the hill opposite, known colloquially as 'The Garth'. Orpheus Road is probably in recognition of the famous Morriston Orpheus Choir.

The old Swansea Tram system extended up the Swansea valley as far as Llanllienwen Road where there was a halt. With the building of the M4 motorway in 1973 the geography of Ynysforgan changed dramatically. The motorway essentially cut the village in two resulting in the demolition of the old Sunday School which stood (roughly) in the vicinity of the M4 exit slip road straight on from Clydach Road and a new Sunday school was built at the top of Garth View and Christopher Road.

Up until the mid-1970s there stood a grand house - Glyncollen - in its own grounds at the top of Garth View. Glyncollen was originally accessed by a long drive that joined the lower end of Llanllienwen Road, but this access was blocked when the motorway divided the village. In the 1930s Glyncollen House was the residence of the late Captain Sidney Davies, Managing Director of the Forest and Worcester Tinplate Works at Morriston - a brother of the late Alderman D. J. Davies of "Firgrove", Llanllienwen Road, a former Mayor of Swansea. He was followed as owner-occupier by the late Doctor and Mrs. N. E. Edwards-Jones, in the 1940s. The house was abandoned in the early 1970s and fell into ruin, only to be demolished later that decade. The grounds were taken over by the council and became a local amenity.

Ynysforgan used to lie on both the main Brecon to Swansea Canal which was navigable until the late 1950s and a Swansea Valley railway line. The canal was filled in and covered over in the 1960s and the route of the railway line has now been used as the Swansea valley by-pass road. There were several relics of World War II such as pillboxes and manholes along the canal: these were demolished when the canal was filled in.
