= Paul Moriarty (rugby) =

Former GB & Wales dual-code rugby international footballer

Personal information
- Full name: William Paul Moriarty
- Born: 16 July 1964 (age 62) Morriston, Swansea, Wales

Playing information

Rugby union
- Position: Back row
Club
Years	Team	Pld	T	G	FG	P
	Morriston
1983–1989	Swansea	178	82			332
1986–1989	Barbarians	2	2			8
1996–2002	Swansea	122	31			155
	Total	302	115	0	0	495
Representative
Years	Team	Pld	T	G	FG	P
1986–88	Wales	21	4			16

Rugby league
- Position: Second-row
Club
Years	Team	Pld	T	G	FG	P
1988–94	Widnes	92	18	5	0	82
1994–96	Halifax	44	10	0	0	40
1996(loan)	→ South Wales	5	1	0	0	4
	Total	141	29	5	0	126
Representative
Years	Team	Pld	T	G	FG	P
1991–94	Great Britain	2	2	0	0	8
1995–00	Wales	14	0	0	0	0

Coaching information
Club
Years	Team	Gms	W	D	L	W%
2009–10	Cardiff RFC

William Paul Moriarty (born 16 July 1964) is a Welsh former international rugby union and rugby league footballer. He played rugby union for Swansea, and represented Wales before joining rugby league club Widnes, winning the 1989 World Club Challenge, and also representing Great Britain.

Moriarty later transferred from Widnes to Halifax Blue Sox, and represented Wales in two Rugby League World Cups. He later returned to rugby union, working in a number of different coaching roles and is employed as assistant coach at the Newcastle Falcons. His older brother, Richard, also played rugby union for Swansea and Wales. Paul's son, Ross Moriarty, is also a professional rugby union player.

== Background ==
A second row or back row forward, Moriarty played rugby union for Swansea RFC, and was in the Wales squad for the 1987 Rugby World Cup, helping Wales to third place and scoring a try in the 22–21 third place play-off victory over Australia.

== Professional playing career ==
Moriarty changed rugby football codes from rugby union to rugby league when he transferred to champions Widnes. He was selected to play on the interchange bench for Widnes in their 1989 World Club Challenge victory over the Canberra Raiders. Moriarty also gained caps for the Great Britain Lions against Papua New Guinea in 1991 and France in 1994. He transferred from Widnes to Halifax for the 1994-95 Rugby Football League season, and was included in the Wales squad for the 1995 Rugby League World Cup, he also played for South Wales on loan.

Moriarty returned to rugby union when the code officially became professional and rejoined Swansea. A few years later following an injury crisis for the Welsh rugby league side's forward pack during the 2000 Rugby League World Cup, 36-year-old Moriarty was recalled to the side.

After coach John Plumtree's departure in November 2001, Moriarty became player-coach, and, along with Tony Clement, ensured Swansea qualified for the 2002–03 Heineken Cup despite being fourth from bottom of the Welsh-Scottish League when they took over.

== Coaching career ==
The Introduction of regional rugby union teams in Wales took place in time for the 2003–04 season, at which time Moriarty joined the Llanelli Scarlets as forwards coach, becoming part of then-head coach Gareth Jenkins' backroom staff. He remained at the club throughout the following tenures of Phil Davies and Nigel Davies.

He became head coach of Principality Welsh Premiership champions Cardiff for the 2009–10 season, and although the Arms Park club qualified for the playoffs despite only finishing seventh, they fell at the first hurdle to Llanelli. On 21 May 2010, Guinness Premiership club Newcastle Falcons announced that they had appointed Moriarty as an assistant coach to his former Widnes teammate Alan Tait.
