= Clase =

Suburb of Swansea, Wales

Coordinates: 51°39′57.00″N 3°56′44.00″W

Clase (Welsh: Y Clas) is a suburban district of the City and County of Swansea, Wales within the Mynydd-Bach ward. Clase approximates to the housing area south of Clasemont Road between Morriston and Llangyfelach. Clase estate consists mainly of social housing which was developed from the 1950s onwards.

== History ==
Clasemont was the home and therefore territorial designation of Sir John Morris, 1st Baronet who founded Morriston, Swansea on the basis of copper-smelting, brass manufacture, tin-plating and coal mining - coal is a major local mineral and copper was imported from other parts of Wales and from Cornwall. Before then, Morriston was a rural and woodland part of Llangyfelach.

A township...containing 5924 inhabitants, the population having greatly increased since the census of 1821. Morriston, a considerable and thriving village, with a large population employed in copper-works, is situated in this hamlet. The Swansea Canal, part of which, called Morris's, was constructed at the expense of the Duke of Beaufort, who receives the tolls, passes close to the village, between it and the Tawy [Tawe], and hence pursues its course through the rest of the hamlet, both that river and the canal being crossed by bridges on the road leading to the town of Neath. The bridge over...Wych-Tree Bridge, from a tree of that description which grew near its eastern end, is admired for its lightness and elegance: it consists of one arch, ninety feet in the span, with cylindrical holes in the abutments, and was executed by Edwards, the celebrated architect of Pont-y-Pridd. Clasemont, late the seat of Sir John Morris...a short distance north-west...has been taken down; there are, however, numerous other respectable residences scattered over the hamlet, which is in general well wooded, and presents many agreeable rides and walks, especially along the banks of the canal, and the Vale of the Tawy. Coal is found in abundance...

— S. Lewis, Clâs, Higher and Lower, A Topographical Dictionary of Wales, 1849

== Landmarks ==
The 16-storey Driver and Vehicle Licensing Agency building is at the bottom of Longview Road, Clase, close to its junction with Clasemont Road, and is visible from several miles away

Clase from the 1960s until 2000s had a number of high rise tower blocks thereafter replaced by various uses such as low rise housing, a multi-use sports pitch and an open green.

== Planning policies ==
Clase is in a Communities First area together with Caemawr under the designation of Clase & Caemawr Communities First Partnership.
