= Morris Castle =

Morris Castle or Castle Graig
- Castell Morris or Castell Graig
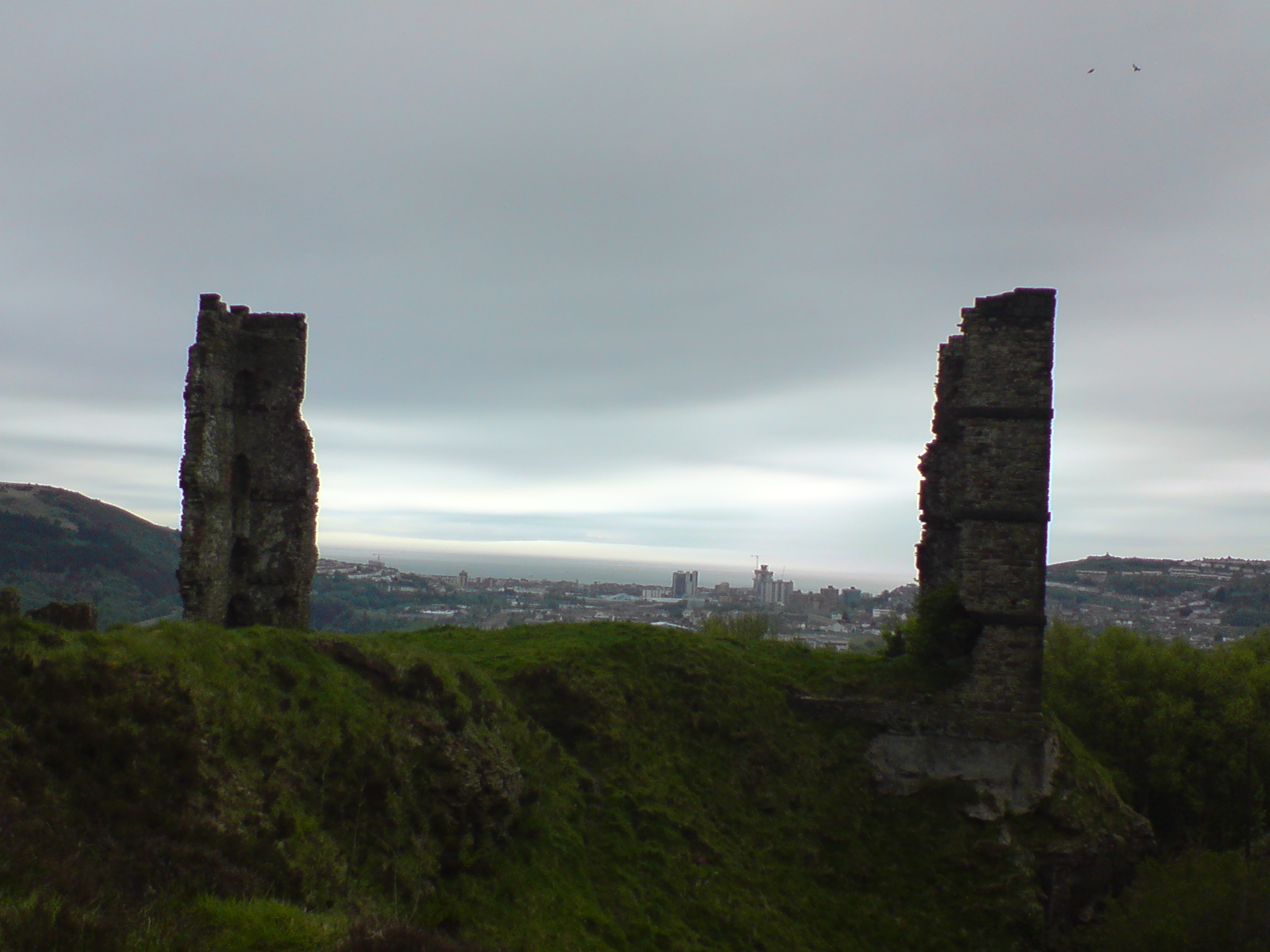

General information
- Type: Ruined tenement building
- Location: Cnap-llwyd common, Trewyddfa, Swansea, Wales, Trewyddfa Road, Morriston, SA6
- Coordinates: 51°39′1.28″N 3°56′20.11″W
- Construction started: 1768
- Completed: 1774
- Owner: Swansea City Council

Technical details
- Floor count: 4

Morris Castle or Castle Graig (Castell Morris or Castell Craig) is a ruined residential building situated on the Cnap-llwyd common in the Trewyddfa area of Swansea, Wales. Constructed by Sir John Morris to house the families of workers, it is one of the earliest examples of a tenement building.

== History ==
=== Construction ===
The castle was constructed between 1768 and 1775 by the coal and copper magnate Sir John Morris. A quadrangle of four towers, each four stories tall were connected by blocks three stories tall, the structure enclosed a central courtyard and was built using local sandstone with decorative battlements, quoins and string courses of copper slag and brickwork. The castle consisted of twenty-four family apartments and was built to house the workers at the Treboeth Level Colliery and the copper works at Landore.

=== Usage and abandonment ===
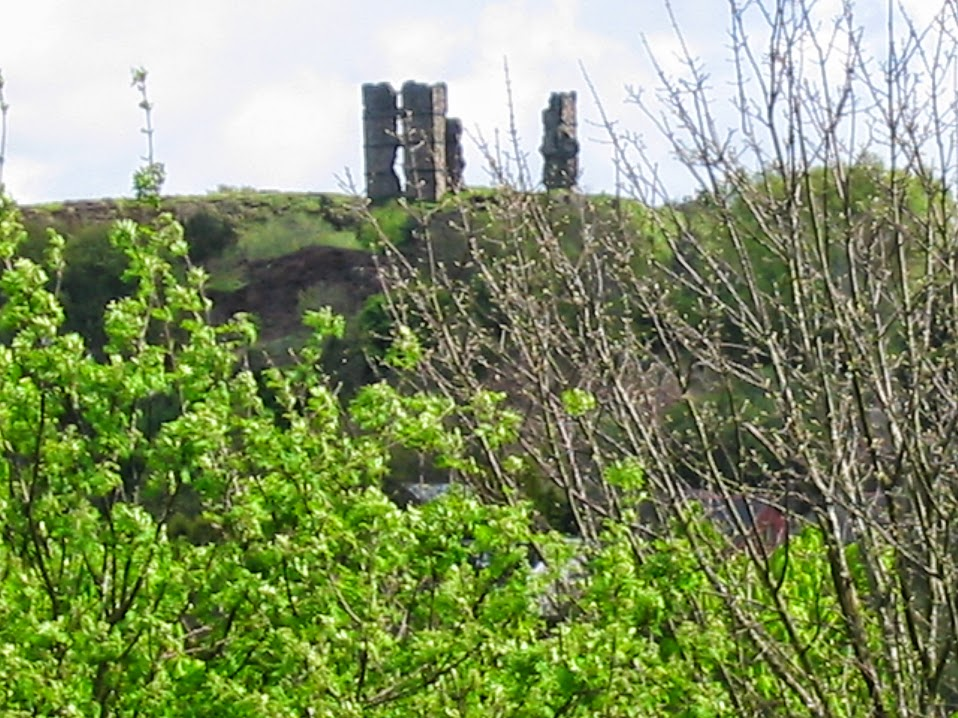
The ruins of Morris Castle

The castle's location on the high Cnap-llwyd proved impractical for workers needs. By the late 1770s, Morris had constructed a number of more conventional workers cottages on the lower ground. These cottages proved to be much more popular, growing into an urban village which became known in English as Morris Town. Despite these issues, the castle would retain some occupants until as late as the 1850s when nearby mining activity made the structure unsafe. In 1877, the Ordnance Survey marked the structure as "in ruins". On 25 January 1990, the easternmost wall of the structure collapsed in high winds during a storm.

=== Appraisal ===
In their 1814 survey of the economy of south Wales, Gwallter Mechain and Iolo Morganwg praised both the castle and John Morris himself as "the most extensive individual builder of comfortable habitations for the labouring class. He first erected a kind of castellated lofty mansion, of a collegiate appearance, with an interior quadrangle, containing the dwellings for forty families, all colliers, excepting one tailor, and one shoemaker."

In 1976, the Castle remains were listed as a Scheduled Ancient Monument by Cadw as a building "of national importance" and one of the first structures erected for housing workers in flats. Swansea City Council purchased the building from the Beaufort Estate the following year.
