= Willie Arnold =

Wales international rugby union footballer

William Richard Arnold
- W. R. Arnold
- Born: William Richard Arnold; 7 July 1881 Morriston, Wales Wales
- Died: 30 July 1957 (aged 76) Morriston, Wales
- Occupation(s): architect and surveyor

Rugby union career
- Position: Wing
Amateur team(s)
Years	Team	Apps	(Points)
??	Morriston RFC		
- Swansea RFC
- Llanelli RFC
- London Welsh
- Neath RFC
- Glamorgan County RFC
1902	Leicester		
International career
Years	Team	Apps	(Points)
1903	Wales	1	(0)

William Richard Arnold (7 July 1881 - 30 July 1957) was a Welsh rugby union international.

Arnold was the son of Thomas Arnold, co-proprietor of the Glanyrafon Tinplate Works, Clydach, Glamorgan and Arnold himself lived in Morriston, near Swansea, Glamorgan. By profession, Arnold was an architect and surveyor. As a rugby player, Arnold played at club level for Morriston, Llanelli, Swansea, Neath, London Welsh, Leicester and Glamorgan. He weighed between 8 stone 7 pounds (119 pounds) and 9 stone (126 pounds).

== Rugby career ==
Arnold played two games for Leicester Tigers on their tour to Devon in 1902. He played against Plymouth and Exeter on Monday 20 January 1902 and Tuesday 21 January 1902 respectively. He was the first future Wales international to play for Leicester.

During the 1902–3 season Arnold scored 35 tries for Llanelli. At Swansea in the following season he scored a further 32 tries. He played in the unbeaten Swansea side in 1904–5. Arnold was picked for Glamorgan in its match against New Zealand in December 1905 and he also played for Llanelli against South Africa in 1906 and was part of the Llanelli team that beat the 1908 touring Australian team.

He played for Wales in one international match, against Scotland in 1903, as a winger.

== Architect and surveyor ==
Rugby union was an amateur sport, even at international level. By profession, Arnold was an architect and surveyor in Morriston and Swansea and surrounding areas. Arnold was elected as a Professional Associate of the Surveyors Institution in October 1907 and became a Fellow of the Surveyors Institution (FSI) in June 1919 - although he was already described as FSI e.g. when reported as a candidate for election as borough estate agent and valuer (Swansea) in The Cambria Daily Leader. The Surveyors Institution became the Chartered Surveyors' Institution in 1930, the Royal Chartered Surveyors’ Institution in 1946 and the Royal Institution of Chartered Surveyors in 1947. William Richard Arnold's Fellowship of the Surveyors Institution therefore became Fellowship of the Chartered Surveyors Institution (as noted in their 1931 list), Fellowship of the Royal Chartered Surveyors’ Institution (1946), and, eventually, Fellowship of the Royal Institution of Chartered Surveyors.

== Later life ==
He was also on the committee of Glamorgan County Cricket Club and was the first secretary and one of the founders of the Morriston Golf Club.

W R Arnold was also the composer, published in 1913 under the pseudonym "R. Arnold Williamson", of a waltz for piano entitled Valse Millicent in honour of his daughter Millicent Margaret Arnold, (later Mrs Gordon Griffiths).

He was twice married: first to Annie Gertrude Jones, daughter of Thomas Hughes Jones of Uplands House, Morriston and second (after the death of his first wife in 1923) to her sister, Evelyn Maud Jones. His daughter Millicent was from his first marriage; he also had a son by his second marriage. His grandchildren included Roy Arnold Griffiths, father of Sir Martin Griffiths, Presiding Judge of Wales.

He died in Morriston on 30 July 1957.

== Bibliography ==
- Bevan, Alun Wyn (2005). Stradey Stories. Llandysul: Gomer Press. ISBN 978-1-84323-570-5.
- Jenkins, John M.; et al. (1991). Who's Who of Welsh International Rugby Players. Wrexham: Bridge Books. ISBN 1-872424-10-4.
- Smith, David; Williams, Gareth (1980). Fields of Praise: The Official History of The Welsh Rugby Union. Cardiff: University of Wales Press. ISBN 0-7083-0766-3.
