= Ynystawe =

Village in Swansea, Wales

Coordinates: 51°41′10.00″N 3°54′25.00″W

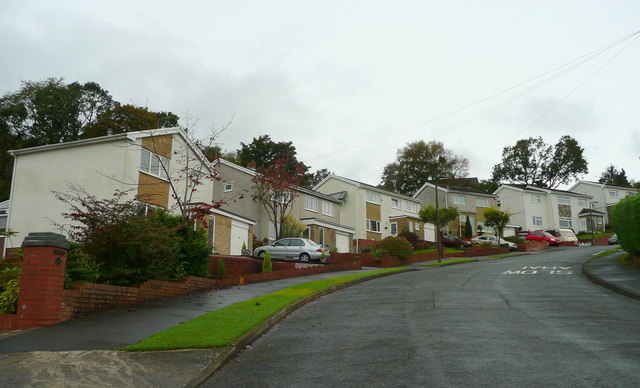
Homes on the steep slopes of Mynydd Gelliwastad dominating Ynystawe.

Ynystawe (also Ynysdawe in Welsh; Welsh pronunciation: [ənɨ̞s.taʊ.ɛ]) is a village in the City and County of Swansea, Wales, and in the electoral ward of Morriston. It is 0.5 miles (1 km) north of the M4 motorway junction 45 between Ynysforgan and Clydach in the Swansea Valley. The Welsh name Ynystawe or Ynysdawe derives from ynys, meaning "island" or "river-meadow", and Tawe, the name of the river running immediately to the east and which gives the Welsh name of Swansea, Abertawe.

== Geography ==
The village occupies the steep lower slopes of the otherwise largely green steep hill, Mynydd Gelliwastad, as well as the narrowest section of alluvial plain on the western side of the Swansea Valley. The lower plateau of Mynydd Bach, and Swansea Bay, can be viewed from its summit. The village is built around the B4063 road, towards neighbouring Clydach to the northeast. The River Tawe is diverted westwards below the village by the Glais moraine. This rare crescentic terminal moraine is a relic of the southern edge of the ice sheet of the last glaciation, and can be seen from the upper parts of the village as a distinctive elevation of the valley floor.

== History ==
A memorial stone to Hopcyn ap Tomos (ap Einion) of Ynystawe c. 1330–1408 stands in Ynystawe Park. Tomos was a learned man who commissioned the compilation of the Llyfr Coch (Red Book), which brought together most of the great Welsh literature of the time into a single volume. This included Cymric (Welsh) prose and poetry as well as the so-called Mabinogion tales. The Llyfr Coch is considered to be the most complete and impressive collection of Cymric literature, and is housed in the University of Oxford's Bodleian Library.

Tomos was considered to possess prophetic powers. For this reason, he was called to the court at Carmarthen by Owain Glyndŵr in 1403 to predict the outcome of the coming conflict between the Welsh and the English.

== Education ==
Ynystawe Primary School is the only school in the village. It is a small English-medium school which is primarily a feeder school for Morriston Comprehensive School. Welsh-medium primary schools are available in the neighbouring villages of Clydach and Llansamlet.

== Sport and leisure ==
The village has a public house named "The Millers Arms", situated on the main road near Ynystawe Park. Ynystawe Cricket and Football Club is a sporting-social club located on the periphery of the village. Ynystawe cricket team won the England & Wales National Village Cricket Championship in 2001. Ynystawe Park is a large open space comprising a children's play area, tennis and basketball courts, bowling green, skateboard ramp, and football and cricket pitches.
