= Scrum V =

- Title card for Scrum V, as used in 2014
- Presented by: Catrin Heledd; Sean Holley; Gareth Rhys Owen; Jamie Roberts; Lauren Salter
- Country of origin: Wales

Production
- Producers: Huw 'Tal' Davies; Craig Withycombe
- Running time: Scrum V Sunday: 30 minutes; Scrum V Live: 120 minutes

Original release
- Network: BBC Two Wales
- Release: 10 September 1995 – present

Related
- Rugby Special Wales; Scrum V Live; Clwb Rygbi

Scrum V (pronounced Scrum Five) is the brand used by BBC Cymru Wales for its rugby union programming. The brand extends to BBC Wales' live coverage, Scrum V Live, highlights and discussion programmes, radio discussion and website.

== Television ==
Prior to the introduction of Scrum V, BBC Wales broadcast a discussion-based rugby union programme called Rugby Special Wales which had been on the air since 1986. In September 1995, this was replaced by Scrum V. In addition, live rugby matches in Wales that are not shown across the UK are shown under the title Scrum V Live. This primarily consists of games in the Pro12/Pro14 league to which the BBC held rights to. The Scrum V Red Zone available via the red button on satellite TV was hosted by Rick O'Shea. However, after the BBC lost the rights to the league, the programme was scaled back – the only games currently shown are in the Welsh Premiership alongside S4C.

The show was initially presented by Alan Wilkins and Eddie Butler. Graham Thomas joined the presentation team in 1998. In 2006, following disputes between the Welsh Rugby Union and the BBC, both Thomas and Butler left the show. Gareth Lewis took over presentation of both the live match coverage and discussion show. In 2011, Ross Harries took over as presenter when Lewis took up a new role with BBC Radio Wales.

Alternative commentary for live matches is also broadcast via the Red Button, and is available outside Wales on Freeview even though the ordinary programme is not available on Freeview outside Wales.

== Website ==
The Scrum V website contains information about the programme, further features centred on Welsh rugby as well as the ability to watch previous editions of the show. The Scrum V website also houses the BBC Rugby Union messageboards. Like the television programme, the website uses a different visual style to that of the rest of BBC Sport, although quotes from the Scrum V messageboard are incorporated into the main BBC Sport website. The original website was produced and run by Welsh historian and author Sean Davies and later continued by Welsh writer Dave Lewis.

== Radio ==
For the 2006/07 season it was announced that a Thursday night discussion programme would be broadcast on BBC Radio Wales under the Scrum V branding.
