= Sean Holley =

Welsh rugby union player & coach

- Born: 6 November 1970 (age 56) Neath, Wales
- Height: 1.88 m (6 ft 2 in)
- Weight: 96 kg (15 st 2 lb)
- University: Loughborough University

Rugby union career
- Position: Fullback
Senior career
Years	Team	Apps	(Points)
1990	Uni NSWales		
1990-1992	Maesteg		
1992-1993	Rugby Lions		
1993-1995	Aberavon		
Coaching career
- Years: Team
- 2000–2003: Gloucester RFC Academy
- 2003–2012: Ospreys
- 2013–2016: Bristol Rugby

Official website
- www.seanholley.co.uk

Sean Holley (born 6 November 1970) is a broadcaster and rugby union coach.

== Rugby career ==
After a year in Australia playing sport Holley played for Maesteg RFC at centre and full back. He studied for a degree in Physical Education & Sports Science at Loughborough University, playing for Loughborough Students and transferring to Rugby Lions whilst at University. On completing his studies Holley gained employment at CCTA (now Coleg Sir Gar) and signed as a fullback for Aberavon RFC until an injury sustained in a match in 1994 against South Africa which saw him forced to end his playing career at the age of 24. During his time as a sports lecturer at Carmarthenshire College, Holley devised a two-year national diploma course in Rugby Studies in 1998. Holley took the concept with him to Hartpury College in Gloucestershire, where he became the college's first Director of Rugby.

Between 2000 and 2003, Holley was the head coach of the Gloucester RFC Academy. Holley joined the Ospreys regional team at their formation in 2003, as assistant coach working under Lyn Jones. When Jones left the region in May 2008, Holley took charge of the region for the 2008–09 season. He remained Head Coach until 2012 winning 5 major trophies with the Region.

Holley was appointed as assistant coach for the Wales national team's 2009 summer tour of North America, with responsibility for defence. The opportunity arose as regular defence coach Shaun Edwards, along with two other Wales coaches, were unavailable due to their participation in the 2009 Lions tour to South Africa.

The 2009–10 season saw Scott Johnson join the Ospreys as Director of Rugby, with Holley remaining at the region as head coach. Holley left the Ospreys in February 2012 by mutual agreement after a dire run of results. The Ospreys went on to win all eight of their remaining games after Holley's departure, including the Grand Final.

After providing short-term cover at the Scarlets regional team while Mark Jones was away assisting the Wales national side during the 2013 Six Nations tournament, Holley joined Bristol Rugby as first team coach ahead of the 2013–14 season. He renewed his contract with Bristol in April 2015. Bristol gained promotion to the English Premiership under Holley's leadership at the end of the 2015/16 season beating Doncaster in their third play off final in as many years. On 24 June 2016, he and Bristol Rugby parted company by mutual consent.

== Media work ==
Following his departure from the Ospreys in February 2012, Holley has worked as a pundit and analyst on BBC Wales' rugby programming including Scrum V.

In June 2012, Holley was approached by Town & Country Broadcasting regarding hosting a radio show about rugby. The first series of the show, titled Rugby Nation and broadcast on Nation Radio along with other Town & Country stations across South Wales started in August 2012. Rugby Nation was nominated in the Best Sports Programme category at the 2013 Sony Radio Academy Awards, and won the bronze award in the category.

Holley now works regularly not only for the BBC and Nation but also for BT Sport, Talksport and Sky Sports. He is an Ambassador for the charity Rugby For Heroes as well as the Velindre Cancer Centre and works closely with sports travel company Venatour. Holley also hosts a rugby and entertainment podcast called Tuesday Club with fellow commentator and Welsh rugby player Shane Williams and Rugby fan and actor Kyle Rees.
