= Welsh Varsity =

Annual university sport event in Wales

The Welsh Varsity is an annual sporting event contested by Cardiff University and Swansea University, usually in early April. The sports contested include rugby union, hockey, cricket, squash, badminton, lacrosse, rowing, golf, basketball, football, American football, ultimate frisbee, netball, volleyball, fencing and an array of other sports. Profits go to charity. The event is held over the course of a week, with some sports competing over a weekend due to the nature of the sport. The majority of the games are held on the Wednesday afternoon, with the centrepiece rugby union match between the two sides held in the evening and often attended by in excess of 18,000 supporters.

== Rugby union ==
The showpiece event of the Welsh Varsity is the rugby union fixture played between the men's teams of the two universities. The event began in 1997 and for the first six years alternated venues between the Cardiff Arms Park and St. Helen's in Swansea. Between 2003 and 2006, it was played at Brewery Field, home of Bridgend RFC, halfway between the two cities. It returned to the Arms Park for three years from 2007 to 2009, followed by a year at Swansea's Liberty Stadium. Since then, the match has been divided between the Liberty Stadium and Cardiff's Millennium Stadium.

As of 2025, Swansea have won 15 of the 27 Varsity matches played, while Cardiff have won 11, including a record 78–7 victory in 2019. The only drawn match came in 2001.

=== Summary ===
==== Overall ====
Details	Played	Won by Cardiff	Won by Swansea	Drawn	Cardiff points	Swansea points
In Cardiff	13	7	6	1	273	204
In Swansea	11	2	8	0	119	187
Neutral venue	4	2	2	0	53	58
Overall	27	11	15	1	552	493

==== Records ====
Note: Date shown in brackets indicates when the record was or last set.

Record	Cardiff	Swansea
Longest winning streak	3 (2017–2019)	4 (1997–2000)
Largest points for
Home	78 (2019)	49 (1998)
Away	27 (2015)	28 (2011)
Largest winning margin
Home	71 (2019)	36 (1998)
Away	8 (2018)	15 (1997)

=== Results ===
Year	Location	Winner	Cardiff	Swansea
1997	Cardiff Arms Park	Swansea	11	26
1998	St. Helen's	Swansea	13	49
1999	Cardiff Arms Park	Swansea	7	13
2000	St. Helen's	Swansea	18	28
2001	Cardiff Arms Park	Draw	10	10
2002	St Helen's	Swansea	3	21
2003	Brewery Field	Cardiff	19	12
2004	Brewery Field	Swansea	11	25
2005	Brewery Field	Swansea	8	16
2006	Brewery Field	Cardiff	15	5
2007	Cardiff Arms Park	Swansea	0	18
2008	Cardiff Arms Park	Cardiff	19	9
2009	Cardiff Arms Park	Cardiff	9	6
2010	Liberty Stadium	Swansea	12	16
2011	Millennium Stadium	Swansea	18	28
2012	Millennium Stadium	Cardiff	33	13
2013	Millennium Stadium	Swansea	13	21
2014	Millennium Stadium	Swansea	15	19
2015	Liberty Stadium	Cardiff	27	22
2016	Liberty Stadium	Swansea	10	16
2017	Millennium Stadium	Cardiff	35	15
2018	Liberty Stadium	Cardiff	23	15
2019	Millennium Stadium	Cardiff	78	7
2020	Liberty Stadium	Swansea	Cancelled due to COVID-19 pandemic	
2021	N/A	N/A	Cancelled due to COVID-19 pandemic	
2022	Liberty Stadium	Swansea	13	20
2023	Cardiff Arms Park	Cardiff	19	15
2024	Swansea.com Stadium	Swansea	28	44
2025	Millennium Stadium	Cardiff	69	0

=== Notable participants ===
Some of those who have played in the Welsh Varsity Match have gone on to win international honours. These include:

- (Wales) Alun Wyn Jones (Swansea University)
- (Wales) Richie Pugh (Swansea University)
- (Wales) Dwayne Peel (Swansea University)
- (Wales) Jamie Roberts (Cardiff University)
- (Wales) Rhys Williams (Cardiff University)

== Welsh Boat Race ==
The inaugural Welsh Boat Race was held in 2006. The Welsh Boat Race has continued to grow due to support from the respective athletic unions, and sponsorship deals. The venue for the boat race has historically been the River Taff, but the venue for 2010 was the River Tawe. The event now takes place in whichever city is hosting the Varsity like most of the other sports. The event was historically held on a Wednesday to coincide with the other Varsity games but due to increasing popularity from alumni, parents and the general public, the event has now been moved to the weekend and the points still count for the Varsity Shield.

== Varsity Shield ==
Over the course of the day, several sports are contested, with a point awarded for each event won. The university with the most points at the end of the day is awarded the Welsh Varsity Shield. In 2017 the shield was won by Swansea University for the first time.

- American football
- Archery
- Athletics
- Badminton
- Basketball
- Boxing
- Canoe polo
- Cricket
- Cycling
- Equestrian
- Fencing
- Field hockey
- Football
- Football (IMG)
- Football (staff)
- Golf
- Karate
- Lacrosse
- Motorsport
- Netball
- Netball (staff)
- Rifle
- Rugby league
- Rugby union (freshers)
- Sailing
- Squash
- Swimming
- Tae kwon do
- Tennis
- Triathlon
- Ultimate frisbee
- Volleyball
- Water polo

== Coverage ==
The Welsh Varsity event is covered in its entirety by both universities' student newspapers and radio stations (Cardiff's Xpress Radio and Swansea's Xtreme Radio). Since 2009, it has also been covered by Cardiff Union Television (CUTV). The men's rugby union match is also broadcast live nationally by the Welsh-language channel S4C.

== See also ==
- List of British and Irish varsity matches
