= Swansea RFC =

Welsh rugby union club, based in Swansea

(Wales) Swansea RFC
- Full name: Swansea Rugby Football Club
- Nickname: The Whites
- Founded: 1872; 154 years ago
- Location: Swansea, Wales
- Ground: St Helen's Rugby and Cricket Ground (Capacity: 4,500)
- Chairman: Stephen Hughes
- Coach: Jonathan Thomas
- League: Super Rygbi Cymru
- 2024-2025: Super Rygbi Cymru, 10th
Team kit

Official website
- www.swansearfc.co.uk

Swansea Rugby Football Club is a Welsh rugby union team which plays in the Super Rygbi Cymru. The club play at St Helen's Rugby and Cricket Ground in Swansea and are also known as The Whites, in reference to their home kit colours.

== History ==
The club was founded in 1872 as an association football team, switching to the rugby code in 1874, and in 1881 it became one of the eleven founder clubs of the Welsh Rugby Union.

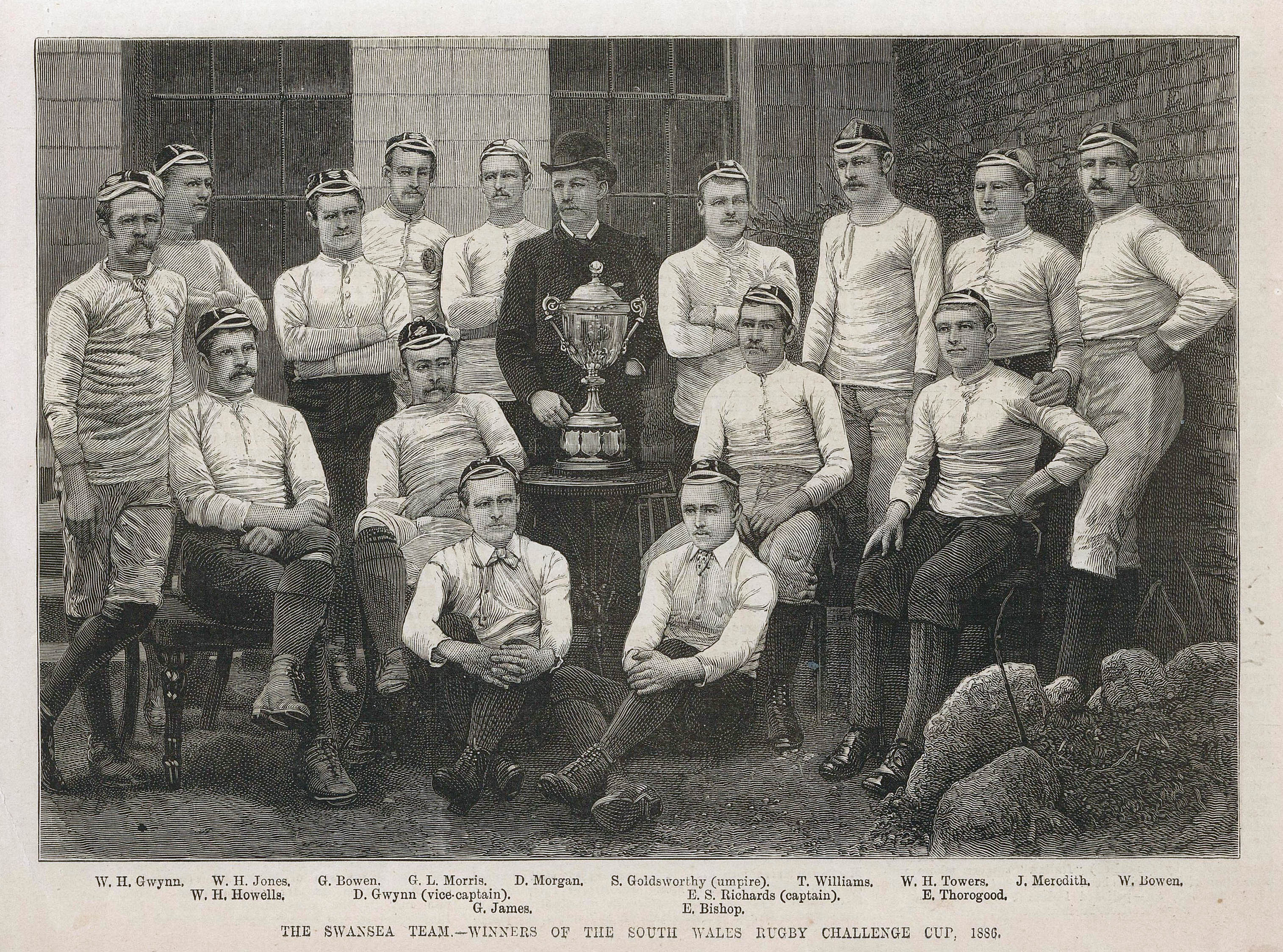
Swansea team that won the South Wales Challenge Cup, as depicted on Illustrated Sporting and Dramatic News

In the early twentieth century Swansea RFC was an extremely successful club. For four consecutive seasons Swansea were the unofficial Welsh champions from the 1898–99 season through to 1901/02, coinciding with the heyday of Swansea's first star player Billy Bancroft. Under the captaincy of Frank Gordon the team would later go on a 22-month unbeaten run, from December 1903 through to October 1905. During this period Swansea appeared to be under-represented at international level. Gordon himself went uncapped throughout his entire career, and apart from Billy Trew, Dick Jones and Dicky Owen, the only other internationals in the senior team were forward Sid Bevan (1 cap), wing Jowett (1 cap) and outside-half Phil Hopkins (4 caps). Trew (29 caps) was an outstanding centre who was accepted as one of the most important players in the evolution of Welsh rugby, while Dicky Owen (35 caps), although only 5-foot 4 inches tall, was an incredible tactician.

The immediate post war years brought only limited success, although a notable 6–6 draw was achieved against New Zealand in 1953 followed by a 9–8 victory against Australia in 1966. It was not until the club's centenary season in 1973/74, however, that the club became Merit Table Champions. Swansea achieved further success as club champions in 1979/80, 1980/81, 1982/83 as well as Welsh cup winners in 1978.

Players during this period included Clem Thomas, Billy Williams, Dewi Bebb, Mervyn Davies, Geoff Wheel, David Richards and Mark Wyatt, the club's record points scorer with 2,740 points scored between 1976/77 and 1991/92.

The 1990s saw success for the club, including being league champions on 4 occasions (1991/92, 1993/94, 1997/98 and 2000/01) and Welsh cup winners in 1995 and 1999. A memorable 21–6 victory was recorded over then World champions Australia at St Helens on 4 November 1992. In season 1995/96 Swansea reached the semi-final stage of the European Cup. This period also included disputes with the Welsh Rugby Union over the way the league structure was being run in Wales following rugby union's move to being a professional game, which culminated in the club's boycott of the 1998/99 league season, in what was referred to as the rebel season.

The 2003/04 season has seen a significant change with the introduction of regional rugby in Wales. Swansea Rugby Football Club Ltd, alongside Neath RFC are co-owners of the Ospreys. As a result, Swansea RFC returned to being an amateur team. Since the change to regional rugby Several players have played for Swansea RFC, as well Ospreys and Wales including Alun Wyn Jones, Ryan Jones, Scott Baldwin, Nicky Smith, Matthew Morgan, Eli Walker, Gavin Henson and Dan Biggar.

In 2014 the All Whites were relegated from the Welsh Premier league on the final day of the season when despite beating Neath at St Helens, a bonus point for Aberavon sent Swansea into the SWALEC Championship. This provoked a complete revamp of the club with Stephen Hughes taking the position of chairman, Keith Colclough as managing director and Richard Lancaster leading a coaching team of former players including Rhodri Jones, Chris Loader and Ben Lewis. In their first season Swansea missed out on promotion back to the Premiership, finishing in second place overall, but were consequently promoted in the 15/16 season along with Merthyr, RGC 1404 and Bargoed.

Swansea struggled to adapt to the Premiership in their first two seasons back at the top flight although despite a crippling injury list, the 17/18 season showed much promise with the side recording five wins, a draw and 10 losing bonus points for losing the game within 7 points.

The 2018/19 season is an important season for the club with potentially five clubs being relegated from the Welsh Premiership in order for the league to contain 12 teams in the 19/20 season. The coaching team of Richard Lancaster, Hugh Gustafson, Ben Lewis, Nick Roberts and Liam Carpener-Jones are currently preparing a squad consisting of many of the 17/18 squad along with new additions which are being announced on the club website regularly.

== Achievements ==
Swansea RFC defeated New Zealand 11–3 on Saturday 28 September 1935, becoming the first ever club side to beat the All Blacks. The victory also made them the first club team to beat all three of the major touring teams to Britain; they had previously beaten Australia in 1908 and South Africa in 1912.

In November 1992, Swansea RFC defeated world champions Australia 21–6, when Australia played their first match of their Welsh Tour.

Welsh Premier Division champions in:

- 1991/1992
- 1993/1994
- 1997/1998
- 2000/2001

Welsh Cup champions in:

- 1977/1978
- 1994/1995
- 1998/1999

Whitbread Merit Table champions in:

- 1980/1981

Snelling Sevens champions in:

- 1982
- 1989
- 1991
- 1995

Super Rgybi Cymru Shield 2025/26

== Club officials ==
- Honorary president: Stan Addicott
- Chairmen: Stephen Hughes
- Managing Director: Keith Colclough
- Honorary Secretary: Alun Donovan
- Board Members: David Blyth, Paul Whapham, Siwan Lillicrap
- Former Players Association Chair: Huw Rees

== Current Team Management ==
- Director of Rugby: Richard Lancaster
- Team Manager: Chris James
- Assistant coach: Hugh Gustafson
- Assistant coach: Ben Lewis
- Assistant coach: Nick Roberts
- Assistant coach: J Rhys Williams
- Assistant coach: Liam Carperner-Jones
- Team Physios: Nikki Donovan, Jessica Hegarty
- Team Doctors: Dr Katy Guy, Dr Daniel Eckford, Dr Craig Dyson
- Equipment Managers: Ian Hopkins, John Mcknight

== British and Irish Lions ==
The following former players were selected for the British and Irish Lions touring squads while playing for Swansea RFC.

- (Wales) Dewi Bebb 1962,1966
- (Wales) Sid Bevan 1904
- (Wales) Colin Charvis 2001
- (Wales) Tony Clement 1989,1993
- (Wales) Tommy David 1974
- (Wales) Mervyn Davies 1974
- (Wales) Trevor Evans 1977
- (Wales) John Faull 1959
- (Wales) Scott Gibbs 1993, 1997, 2001
- (Wales) Rowe Harding 1924
- (Wales) Robert Jones 1989,1993
- (Wales) Fred Jowett 1904
- (Wales) Edgar Morgan 1908
- (Wales) Eddie Morgan 1938
- (Wales) Darren Morris 2001
- (Wales) Dai Parker 1930
- (Wales) David Richards 1980
- (Wales) Haydn Tanner 1938
- (Wales) Mark Taylor 2001
- (Wales) Clem Thomas 1955
- (Wales) Richard Webster 1993
- (Wales) Clive Williams 1980
- (Wales) Billy Williams 1955

== Wales International Captains ==
The following former players captained the Wales national rugby union team while playing for Swansea RFC.

See also Wales rugby union captains

- William Bowen 1891
- Billy Bancroft 1898–1901
- Dicky Owen 1907–12
- Billy Trew 1907–13
- Jack Bancroft 1912
- Tom Parker 1921–23
- Joe Rees 1924
- Rowe Harding 1924–28
- Guy Morgan 1929–30
- Watcyn Thomas 1933
- Claude Davey 1934–37
- Idwal Rees 1936–37
- Clem Thomas 1958–59
- Mervyn Davies 1975–76
- Richard Moriarty 1986–87
- Robert Jones 1989–90
- Scott Gibbs 1997
- Mark Taylor 2000
- Andy Moore 2001
- Colin Charvis 2002–04
- Alun Wyn Jones 2017–2022

== Other notable former players ==
The players listed below have played for Swansea and have also played international rugby.

- (Wales) Willie Arnold
- (Wales) Paul Arnold
- (Wales) Rob Appleyard
- (Wales) Dan Baker
- (Wales) Huw Bennett
- (Wales) Dan Biggar
- (Wales) Bleddyn Bowen
- (England) Maurice Colclough
- (England) Tony Swift
- (Wales) Malcolm Dacey
- (Wales) Sam Davies
- (Wales) Stuart Davies
- (Scotland) Lewis Dick
- (Wales) Ben Evans
- (Wales) Frank Gordon
- (Wales) James Griffiths
- (Wales) David Gwynn
- (Wales) George Hayward
- (Wales) Gavin Henson
- (Wales) Richard Hibbard
- (Wales) David James
- (Wales) Evan James
- (Wales) Garin Jenkins
- (Wales) Ryan Jones
- (Wales) Alun Wyn Jones
- (Wales) Geraint Lewis
- (Samoa) Brian Lima
- (Wales) Christian Loader
- (Tonga) Sililo Martens
- (Wales) Robin McBryde
- (Wales) William McCutcheon
- (Wales) Ivor Morgan
- (Wales) Kevin Morgan
- (Wales) Matthew Morgan
- (Wales) Paul Moriarty
- (Wales) Tom Prydie
- (Wales) Richie Pugh
- (Wales) Dan Rees
- (Wales) Clive Rowlands
- (Wales) Mike Ruddock
- (Wales) Arwel Thomas
- (Wales) Watcyn Thomas
- (Wales) Rory Thornton
- (Wales) Bleddyn Taylor
- (Wales) Eli Walker
- (Wales) David Weatherley
- (Canada) Nik Witkowski
- (Wales) Geoff Wheel
- (Wales) Brynmor Williams
- (Wales) Dai Young

== Games played against international opposition ==
Year	Date	Opponent	Result	Score	Tour
1888	24 December	New Zealand Māori	Loss	0–5	1888–89 New Zealand Māori tour
1905	30 December	New Zealand	Loss	3–4	1905 Original All Blacks tour
1908	26 December	Australia	Win	6–0	1908–09 Australia tour of Britain
1912	26 December	South Africa	Win	3–0	1912–13 South Africa tour of Europe
1931	10 October	South Africa	Loss	3–10	1931–32 South Africa tour of Britain and Ireland
1935	28 September	New Zealand	Win	11–3	1935–36 New Zealand tour of Britain, Ireland and Canada
1951	15 December	South Africa	Loss	3–11	1951–52 South African tour of Europe
1953	12 December	New Zealand	Draw	6–6	1953–54 New Zealand tour
1963	14 December	New Zealand	Loss	9–16	1963–64 New Zealand tour
1966	26 November	Australia	Win	9–8	1966–67 Australia tour of Britain, Ireland and France
1973	8 September	Fiji	Loss	0–31	1973 Fiji tour of the British Isles and Canada
1973	3 November	Australia	Draw	9–9	1973 Australia rugby union tour of Europe
1975	29 November	Australia	Loss	6-12	1975–76 Australia tour of Britain and Ireland
1980	25 October	New Zealand	Loss	0-32	1980 New Zealand tour
1981	28 November	Australia	Loss	3-12	1981–82 Australia tour of Britain & Ireland
1982	30 October	New Zealand Māori	Win	15-12	1982 New Zealand Māori tour
1984	30 October	Australia	Loss	7-17	1984 Australia tour of Britain and Ireland
1985	16 October	Fiji	Loss	14–23	1985 Fiji tour of the British Isles
1989	21 October	New Zealand	Loss	22–37	1989 New Zealand tour of the British Isles and Canada
1992	4 November	Australia	Win	21–6	1992 Australian tour of Europe

== Bibliography ==
- Smith, David; Williams, Gareth (1980). Fields of Praise: The Official History of The Welsh Rugby Union. Cardiff: University of Wales Press. ISBN 0-7083-0766-3.
