= Richard Moriarty =

Welsh rugby union player

Richard Moriarty (born 1 May 1957 at Gorseinon near Swansea) is a Welsh former rugby union player. He played 23 matches for Wales, either as a second row or back row forward, scoring two tries, and captained Wales eight times.

During his time as Welsh captain, he lost only once, in the semi-finals of the inaugural Rugby World Cup against the eventual winners, New Zealand. Wales beat Australia to claim third place, still the best performance by Wales in a Rugby World Cup. He has been quoted as saying that captaining the Welsh side at the first world cup was the "icing on the cake" of his career.

He has been heavily involved with Swansea RFC throughout his career. As a player, he holds the club's all-time record for appearances, 472 in a career spanning over 20 years from 1976–77 to 1997–98 in which he also scored 32 tries. He was club captain for three consecutive seasons 1986–87, 1988–88 and 1988–89. More recently he was the team manager and, since December 2006, he has been on the board of directors.

== Personal ==
Richard Moriarty is the elder brother of fellow Swansea and Wales rugby union and rugby league player Paul Moriarty. Richard's nephew Ross Moriarty is also a professional rugby union player.
