= Ross Moriarty =

British Lions & Wales international rugby union footballer

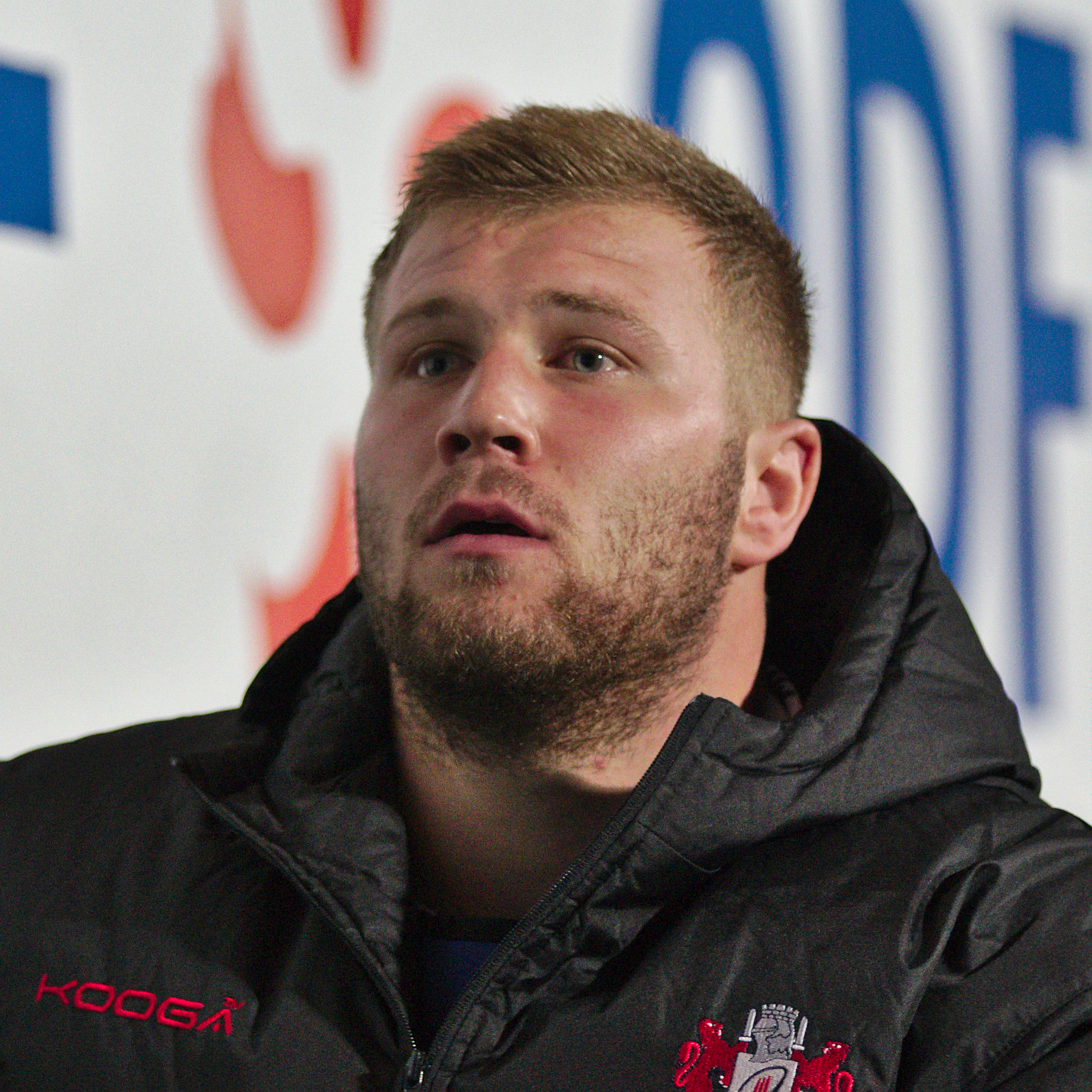
- Born: Ross Moriarty; 18 April 1994 (age 32) St Helens, Merseyside, England
- Height: 1.88 m (6 ft 2 in)
- Weight: 108 kg (238 lb; 17 st 0 lb)
- School: Glyncollen Primary School and Morriston Comprehensive School
- Notable relative(s): Paul Moriarty (father); Richard Moriarty (Uncle)

Rugby union career
- Position(s): Blindside Flanker; Number 8
Senior career
Years	Team	Apps	(Points)
2012–2018	Gloucester	95	(60)
2012–2014	→ Hartpury College (loan)	13	(40)
2018–2023	Dragons	54	(10)
2023–2025	Brive	41	(10)
2025-present	Ospreys 18		
- Correct as of October 2025
International career
Years	Team	Apps	(Points)
2012	England U18	5	(10)
2013–2014	England U20	6	(0)
2015–2022	Wales	54	(15)
2017	British & Irish Lions		
- Correct as of Sept 2025

Ross Moriarty (born 18 April 1994) is a Welsh international rugby union player, who currently plays for the Ospreys. Moriarty has represented Wales and England U20.

== Personal life ==
Moriarty was born in St Helens, Merseyside while his father, former Wales international Paul Moriarty, was in the north of England playing rugby league. Moriarty is also the nephew of former Wales international captain Richard Moriarty.

He was educated at Glyncollen Primary School and Morriston Comprehensive School in Swansea, Wales. He took up rugby union at the age of ten playing for Swansea Schools and West Wales Schools. He also played his junior rugby at Gorseinon RFC

== Club career ==
Moriarty made his debut for Gloucester on 10 November 2012 against the Ospreys, his age-grade team in the LV= Cup. He did not play for Gloucester regularly in his first season however, but was a regular with Hartpury RFC, where he was a student.

On 27 November 2017, it was announced that Moriarty would leave Gloucester to join Welsh region Dragons in the Pro14 on a two-year WRU central contract from the 2018–19 season.

On 7 April 2023, Moriarty departed the Dragons with immediate effect to join Brive.

He joined Ospreys in the summer of 2025 to play for his hometown club for the 2025-2026 season.

== International career ==
=== England ===
Moriarty made his international debut with England Under-18 against France at Fylde in February 2012. He went on to score tries against Scotland and Wales in his first four appearances, and helped England to become European champions in Spain.

He started the first two games for England in the 2013 under-20 Six Nations but was unavailable for the final three matches after being red carded in the match against Ireland in Athlone. He played in every match of the 2013 IRB Junior World Championship and scored three tries against the US in a pool game.

In the 2014 IRB Junior World Championship Moriarty won the tournament with England with impressive performances throughout the whole tournament.

=== Wales ===
Moriarty made his full international debut in the starting line up for Wales versus Ireland on 8 August 2015. On 15 September 2015, Moriarty was chosen as a replacement for Eli Walker in the 2015 Rugby World Cup squad after Walker suffered an injury.

Moriarty came off the bench against Ireland in the opening match of the 2022 Six Nations Championship to earn his 50th cap in the 29–7 loss.

==== International tries ====
Try	Opponent	Location	Venue	Competition	Date	Result
1	Italy	Cardiff, Wales	Millennium Stadium	2016 Six Nations	19 March 2016	Win
2	Italy	Cardiff, Wales	Millennium Stadium	2016 Six Nations	19 March 2016	Win
3	France	Oita, Japan	Bank Dome	2019 Rugby World Cup	20 October 2019	Win
