= Hugh Gustafson =

Welsh rugby player

- Born: Hugh Gustafson; 8 July 1987 (age 39) Carmarthen, Wales
- Height: 183 cm (6 ft 0 in)
- Weight: 114 kg (17 st 13 lb)
- University: UWIC

Rugby union career
- Position(s): Hooker, Prop
- Current team: Newport Gwent Dragons
Senior career
Years	Team	Apps	(Points)
2006-07	Llanelli RFC	11	(5)
2009, 2011-13	Bedwas RFC	15	(10)
2012, 2014	Cross Keys	4	(0)
2012, 2014-15	Newport RFC	4	(0)
Provincial / State sides
Years	Team	Apps	(Points)
2007-16	Newport Gwent Dragons	149	(15)
2016-	Ospreys		
International career
Years	Team	Apps	(Points)
- Wales U20

Hugh Gustafson (born 8 July 1987) is a Welsh rugby union player. A prop forward or hooker, he currently plays his club rugby for Pontypool RFC and Newport Gwent Dragons regional team. He has been capped by Wales at Under 16, Under 18, Under 19 and Under 20 levels.
