= Ben Lewis (rugby union) =

- Born: Ben Lewis; 26 August 1986 (age 40) Swansea, Wales
- Height: 182 cm (6 ft 0 in)

Rugby union career
- Position: Flanker
- Current team: Ospreys
Senior career
Years	Team	Apps	(Points)
2006-2011	Ospreys	24	(15)
- Correct as of 10:22, 9 Mar 2011 (UTC)

Ben Lewis (born 26 August 1986 in Swansea, Wales) is a former Welsh rugby union player for the Ospreys in the Celtic League. A flanker, he was forced to retire due to injury in March 2011

His brother Sam Lewis is also a professional rugby union player.
