= 2014–15 Scarlets season =

Scarlets
- 2014–15 season
- Head coach: (New Zealand) Wayne Pivac
- Chief executive: Darran Phillips
- Chairman: Nigel Short
- Pro12: 6th
- Anglo-Welsh Cup: Pool stage, 4th
- European Champions Cup: Pool stage, 4th
- Top try scorer: League: Liam Williams (7); All: Harry Robinson (8)
- Top points scorer: League: Steven Shingler (127); All: Steven Shingler (151)
- Highest home attendance: 12,301 v Ospreys, 3 January 2015
- Lowest home attendance: 5,051 v London Irish, 31 January 2015
- Average home attendance: 6,632

The 2014–15 season was the 12th in the history of the Scarlets Welsh regional rugby union side, in which they competed in the Pro12, the European Rugby Champions Cup and the Anglo-Welsh Cup. It was head coach Wayne Pivac's first season in charge of the region, after Simon Easterby left the Scarlets to become Ireland's forwards coach. In addition to Pivac, Byron Hayward joined the region as a defence coach, while Danny Wilson left for Bristol. In September 2014, Mark Davies stepped down as chief executive to take up a role with Pro Rugby Wales, and was replaced by Darran Phillips.

== Pre-season and friendlies ==
Date	Opponents	H / A	Result F–A	Scorers	Attendance
16 August 2014	Bath	A	26–26	Tries: McCusker, S. Williams, J. Davies, A. Davies; Conversions: S. Shingler (3)	
30 August 2014	Gloucester	H	29–24	Tries: Owens 17', S. Williams 33', Tagicakibau 47', Pitman 68'; Conversions: Rhys Priestland 17', 33', S. Shingler 68'; Penalty: Priestland 12'	4,333

== Pro 12 ==
=== Fixtures ===
Date	Opponents	H / A	Result F–A	Scorers	Attendance	Table position
6 September 2014	Ulster	H	32–32	Tries: Robinson 1', Pitman 25', G. Davies 38', 63'; Conversions: Priestland 3', 26', 40'; Penalties: Priestland 11', 45'	6,531	6th
13 September 2014	Leinster	A	12–42	Tries: S. Williams 13', Snyman 80'; Conversion: S. Shingler 80+1'	16,108	9th
20 September 2013	Treviso	H	43–0	Tries: E. Phillips 1', G. Davies 15', 37', L. Williams 45', 51', Snyman 48', Owen 63'; Conversions: Priestland 2', 38', 49', 53'	5,791	6th
26 September 2014	Edinburgh	A	20–20	Tries: Robinson 2', L. Williams 32'; Conversions: Priestland 3', 33', Penalties: Priestland 12', 45'	3,678	7th
5 October 2014	Dragons	H	26–13	Tries: Owen 18', Phillips 65'; Conversions: Priestland 19', 67'; Penalties: Priestland 13', 15', 55', S. Shingler 78'	7,124	6th
10 October 2014	Munster	A	6–17	Penalty: Priestland 38'; Drop goal: Priestland 1'	13,851	6th
1 November 2014	Zebre	H	28–13	Try: Hughes 60'; Conversion: S. Shingler 60'; Penalties: S. Shingler 6', 15', 28', 33', 42', 47', 78'	5,342	6th
21 November 2014	Glasgow	H	19–9	Try: Pitman 76'; Conversion: S. Shingler 77'; Penalties: S. Shingler 5', 13', 25'	6,038	6th
29 November 2014	Connacht	A	8–14	Try: Robinson 3'; Penalty: S. Shingler 1'	5,631	7th
19 December 2014	Cardiff Blues	A	9–21	Penalties: Priestland 23', 26', 50'	9,443	7th
27 December 2014	Ospreys	A	15–17	Penalties: Priestland 8', S. Shingler 21', 37', 57', 65'	15,732	7th
3 January 2015	Ospreys	H	22–10	Tries: L. Williams 30', Barclay 41'; Penalties: Priestland 3', 26' 39', 57'	12,301	7th
9 January 2015	Glasgow	A	7–22	Tries: L. Williams 39'; Conversion: Priestland 40'	5,320	8th
15 February 2015	Connacht	H	32–14	Tries: Tagicakibau 23', Robinson 27', J. Williams 33', J. Davies 50'; Conversions: S. Shingler 28', 34', 51'; Penalties: S. Shingler 13', 17'	5,322	7th
21 February 2015	Munster	H	25-25	Try: Parkes 60'; Conversion: S. Shingler 61'; Penalties: S. Shingler 3', 14', 23', 27', 59', 68'	6,059	6th
27 February 2015	Ulster	A	20–25	Tries: Barclay 38', Phillips 78'; Conversions: S. Shingler 38', 80+1'; Penalties: S. Shingler 13', 29'	17,138	7th
7 March 2015	Leinster	H	23–13	Tries: Barclay 30', J. Williams 52', Pitman 67'; Conversion: S. Shingler 53'; Penalties: S. Shingler 10', Priestland 76'	6,069	7th
28 March 2015	Edinburgh	H	15–26	Penalties: S. Shingler 2', 12', 19', 23', 26'	7,310	8th
11 April 2015	Zebre	A	28–26	Tries: S. Williams 10', 44', J. Davies 74'; Conversions: S. Shingler 11', Priestland 45'; Penalties: S. Shingler 8', 37', Priestland 80+2'	2,539	7th
25 April 2015	Newport Gwent Dragons	A	29–10	Tries: Owens 37', S. Williams 39', L. Williams 41', Robinson 57'; Conversions: Priestland 38', 40', 42'; Penalty: Priestland 6'	52,762	6th
10 May 2015	Cardiff Blues	H	16–6	Try: Owens 67'; Conversion: Priestland 68'; Penalties: Priestland 25', 31', 39'	10,195	6th
16 May 2015	Treviso	A	17–13	Tries: L. Williams, Evans; Conversions: Priestland (2); Penalty: Priestland	3,895	6th

=== Table ===
Pos	Club	Pld	W	D	L	F	A	PD	BP	Pts
5	(Ireland) Leinster	22	11	3	8	483	375	108	12	62
6	(Wales) Scarlets	22	11	3	8	452	388	64	7	57
7	(Ireland) Connacht	22	10	1	11	447	419	28	8	50

== Anglo-Welsh Cup ==
=== Fixtures ===
Date	Opponents	H / A	Result F–A	Scorers	Attendance	Pool position
7 November 2014	Northampton	H	7–24	Try: Evans 22'; Conversion: S. Shingler 23'	5,564	4th
14 November 2014	Cardiff Blues	A	13–19	Try: Bennett 43'; Conversion: Lewis 44'; Penalties: Lewis 3', 39'	6,284	4th
31 January 2015	London Irish	H	27-18	Tries: Robinson 54', Ad. Warren 62', K. Evans 68'; Conversions: S. Shingler 55', 63', 70'; Penalties: S. Shingler 2', 23'	5,051	3rd
7 February 2015	Sale	A	3–38	Penalty: Climo 13'	4,312	4th

=== Table ===
Club	Pld	W	D	L	F	A	PD	BP	Pts
Leicester Tigers	4	4	0	0	106	46	60	2	18
Newcastle Falcons	4	2	0	2	114	91	23	3	11
Wasps	4	1	0	3	120	128	−8	5	9
Scarlets	4	1	0	3	50	99	−49	1	5

== European Champions Cup ==
=== Fixtures ===
Date	Opponents	H / A	Result F–A	Scorers	Attendance	Pool position
19 October 2014	Toulon	A	28–18	Tries: Barclay 27', K. Phillips 80+1'; Conversion: Priestland 28'; Penalties: Priestland 14', 36'	15,300	4th
25 October 2014	Leicester Tigers	H	15–3	Tries: Robinson 17', A. Davies 61'; Conversion: S. Shingler 62'; Penalty: S. Shingler 31'	8,235	2nd
6 December 2014	Ulster	A	9–24	Penalties: Priestland 4', 30', 56'	16,400	3rd
14 December 2014	Ulster	H	22–13	Tries: J. Davies 78'; Conversion: Priestland 79'; Penalties: Priestland 11', 19', 28', 33', 60'	7,230	2nd
16 January 2015	Leicester Tigers	A	23–40	Tries: R. Evans 34', Robinson 60', 75'; Conversion: S. Shingler 75'; Penalties: Priestland 6', 21'	18,913	3rd
24 January 2015	Toulon	H	3–26	Penalty: S. Shingler 30'	9,267	4th

=== Table ===
Pool Three

Team	Pld	W	D	L	F	A	PD	BP	Pts
(France) Toulon	6	5	0	1	181	89	92	2	22
(England) Leicester Tigers	6	3	0	3	108	126	−18	1	13
(Northern Ireland) Ulster	6	2	0	4	116	146	−30	4	12
(Wales) Scarlets	6	2	0	4	90	134	−44	0	8

== Transfers ==
=== In ===
Date confirmed	Pos.	Name	From
4 December 2013	CE	(New Zealand) Regan King	Clermont Auvergne
6 May 2014	WG	(Wales) Harry Robinson	Cardiff Blues
20 May 2014	PR	(Wales) / (England) Peter Edwards	London Welsh
6 June 2014	N8	(Wales) Rory Pitman	London Wasps
18 June 2014	N8	(Tonga) Chris Hala'ufia	London Irish
3 July 2014	WG/CE	(Fiji) Michael Tagicakibau	Saracens
2 December 2014	CE	(New Zealand) Hadleigh Parkes	Auckland

=== Out ===
Date confirmed	Pos.	Name	To
12 November 2013	CE	(Wales) Jonathan Davies	Clermont Auvergne
3 February 2014	FL	(Wales) Josh Turnbull	Cardiff Blues
24 March 2014	FH	(Wales) Aled Thomas	Gloucester
28 April 2014	PR	(Fiji) Deacon Manu	Hong Kong Cricket Club (Note: Manu retired from playing and is becoming a head coach.)
29 April 2014	N8/FL/LK	(Tonga) Sione Timani	Tarbes
6 May 2014	PR	(Wales) Gareth Thomas	Ospreys
15 May 2014	CE/WG	(Wales) Nic Reynolds	London Welsh
9 June 2014	FH/CE	(England) Olly Barkley	London Welsh
2 September 2014	CE	(Wales) Gareth Maule	Bristol
14 November 2014	N8	(Tonga) Chris Hala'ufia	London Welsh

== Statistics ==
(+ in the Apps column denotes substitute appearance)

Pos.	Name	Pro 12						Anglo-Welsh Cup						European Champions Cup						Total						Discipline	
Pos.	Name	Apps	Try	Con	Pen	Drop	Pts	Apps	Try	Con	Pen	Drop	Pts	Apps	Try	Con	Pen	Drop	Pts	Apps	Try	Con	Pen	Drop	Pts	Yellow card	Red card
FB	(Wales) Liam Williams	12	7	0	0	0	35	0	0	0	0	0	0	4	0	0	0	0	0	16	7	0	0	0	35	3	1
FB/CE	(Wales) Gareth Owen	7+2	2	0	0	0	10	1	0	0	0	0	0	0+1	0	0	0	0	0	8+3	2	0	0	0	10	0	0
FB/WG	(Wales) Steff Evans	7	1	0	0	0	5	2	1	0	0	0	5	0	0	0	0	0	0	9	2	0	0	0	10	0	0
WG	(Wales) Harry Robinson	19	5	0	0	0	25	1	1	0	0	0	5	5	3	0	0	0	15	25	9	0	0	0	45	0	0
WG/CE	(Fiji) Michael Tagicakibau	12+2	1	0	0	0	5	0	0	0	0	0	0	4	0	0	0	0	0	16+2	1	0	0	0	5	0	0
WG/FB/FH	(Wales) Jordan Williams	6+3	2	0	0	0	10	2	0	0	0	0	0	1+2	0	0	0	0	0	9+5	2	0	0	0	10	0	0
WG	(Wales) Kristian Phillips	5+2	2	0	0	0	10	2	0	0	0	0	0	3+1	1	0	0	0	5	10+3	3	0	0	0	15	1	0
WG/CE/FH	(New Zealand) Frazier Climo	0	0	0	0	0	0	3	0	0	1	0	3	0	0	0	0	0	0	3	0	0	1	0	3	0	0
WG	(Wales) Aaron Warren	0	0	0	0	0	0	1+2	0	0	0	0	0	0	0	0	0	0	0	1+2	0	0	0	0	0	0	0
WG	(Wales) Josh Adams	0	0	0	0	0	0	1	0	0	0	0	0	0	0	0	0	0	0	1	0	0	0	0	0	0	0
WG	(Wales) Kyle Evans	0	0	0	0	0	0	1+1	1	0	0	0	5	0	0	0	0	0	0	1+1	1	0	0	0	5	0	0
WG	(Wales) Lee Williams	0	0	0	0	0	0	0+1	0	0	0	0	0	0	0	0	0	0	0	0+1	0	0	0	0	0	0	0
WG	(Wales) Richard Williams	0	0	0	0	0	0	0+1	0	0	0	0	0	0	0	0	0	0	0	0+1	0	0	0	0	0	0	0
CE	(New Zealand) Regan King	12+1	0	0	0	0	0	0	0	0	0	0	0	4	0	0	0	0	0	16+1	0	0	0	0	0	0	0
CE	(Wales) Scott Williams	15	4	0	0	0	20	0	0	0	0	0	0	6	0	0	0	0	0	21	4	0	0	0	20	1	0
CE/WG	(Wales) Adam Warren	2+6	0	0	0	0	0	2	1	0	0	0	5	0	0	0	0	0	0	4+6	1	0	0	0	5	0	0
CE	(Wales) Steffan Hughes	0+3	1	0	0	0	5	2	0	0	0	0	0	0	0	0	0	0	0	2+3	1	0	0	0	5	0	0
CE	(Wales) Iolo Evans	0	0	0	0	0	0	2	0	0	0	0	0	0	0	0	0	0	0	2	0	0	0	0	0	0	0
CE/WG	(New Zealand) Hadleigh Parkes	12+1	1	0	0	0	5	0	0	0	0	0	0	2+1	0	0	0	0	0	14+2	1	0	0	0	5	0	0
FH	(Wales) Rhys Priestland	14+4	0	19	23	1	110	0	0	0	0	0	0	6	0	2	12	0	40	20+4	0	21	38	1	150	0	0
FH	(Wales) Steven Shingler	9+13	0	11	35	0	127	2	0	4	2	0	14	1+5	0	2	2	0	10	12+18	0	17	39	0	151	1	0
FH	(Wales) Josh Lewis	0+1	0	0	0	0	0	2+1	0	1	2	0	8	0+1	0	0	0	0	0	2+3	0	1	2	0	8	0	0
FH	(Wales) Dan Jones	0	0	0	0	0	0	0+1	0	0	0	0	0	0	0	0	0	0	0	0+1	0	0	0	0	0	0	0
SH	(Wales) Gareth Davies	4+8	4	0	0	0	20	0	0	0	0	0	0	0	0	0	0	0	0	4+8	4	0	0	0	20	0	1
SH	(Wales) Rhodri Williams	1+10	0	0	0	0	0	2	0	0	0	0	0	1+4	0	0	0	0	0	4+14	0	0	0	0	0	0	0
SH	(Wales) Aled Davies	17+3	0	0	0	0	0	0	0	0	0	0	0	5+1	1	0	0	0	5	22+4	1	0	0	0	5	0	0
SH	(Wales) Rhodri Davies	0+1	0	0	0	0	0	1+1	0	0	0	0	0	0	0	0	0	0	0	1+2	0	0	0	0	0	0	0
SH	(Wales) Kieran Hardy	0	0	0	0	0	0	1	0	0	0	0	0	0	0	0	0	0	0	1	0	0	0	0	0	0	0
SH	(Wales) Justin James	0	0	0	0	0	0	0+1	0	0	0	0	0	0	0	0	0	0	0	0+1	0	0	0	0	0	0	0
N8	(Wales) Rory Pitman	6+10	3	0	0	0	15	3	0	0	0	0	0	3+2	0	0	0	0	0	12+12	3	0	0	0	15	1	0
N8/LK	(Australia) Jack Payne	0+3	0	0	0	0	0	1+1	0	0	0	0	0	0	0	0	0	0	0	1+4	0	0	0	0	0	0	0
N8/FL	(Wales) Craig Price	0	0	0	0	0	0	1	0	0	0	0	0	0	0	0	0	0	0	1	0	0	0	0	0	0	0
FL	(Scotland) John Barclay	21	3	0	0	0	15	0	0	0	0	0	0	3	1	0	0	0	5	24	4	0	0	0	20	3	0
FL	(Wales) Rob McCusker	6+7	0	0	0	0	0	2	0	0	0	0	0	3	0	0	0	0	0	12+7	0	0	0	0	0	0	0
FL	(Wales) Aaron Shingler	17+1	0	0	0	0	0	0	0	0	0	0	0	6	0	0	0	0	0	23+1	0	0	0	0	0	1	0
FL	(Wales) James Davies	13+3	2	0	0	0	10	1	0	0	0	0	0	2+3	1	0	0	0	5	16+6	3	0	0	0	15	1	0
FL	(Wales) Sion Bennett	0+1	0	0	0	0	0	2+2	1	0	0	0	5	0+1	0	0	0	0	0	2+4	1	0	0	0	5	1	0
FL	(Wales) Will Boyde	0+3	0	0	0	0	0	1	0	0	0	0	0	0	0	0	0	0	0	1+3	0	0	0	0	0	0	0
FL/LK	(Wales) Phil Day	0	0	0	0	0	0	2+1	0	0	0	0	0	0	0	0	0	0	0	2+1	0	0	0	0	0	0	0
FL	(Wales) Josh Middleton	0	0	0	0	0	0	0+1	0	0	0	0	0	0	0	0	0	0	0	0+1	0	0	0	0	0	0	0
LK	(South Africa) Johan Snyman	15	2	0	0	0	10	0	0	0	0	0	0	4	0	0	0	0	0	19	2	0	0	0	10	0	0
LK	(Wales) Jake Ball	14	0	0	0	0	0	0	0	0	0	0	0	3	0	0	0	0	0	17	0	0	0	0	0	1	0
LK	(Wales) Richard Kelly	0+3	0	0	0	0	0	0	0	0	0	0	0	1	0	0	0	0	0	1+3	0	0	0	0	0	0	0
LK	(South Africa) George Earle	8+8	0	0	0	0	0	2	0	0	0	0	0	3+2	0	0	0	0	0	13+10	0	0	0	0	0	2	0
LK/FL	(Wales) Lewis Rawlins	10+3	0	0	0	0	0	1	0	0	0	0	0	1+3	0	0	0	0	0	12+6	0	0	0	0	0	0	0
LK	(Wales) Shaun Jones	0	0	0	0	0	0	3	0	0	0	0	0	0	0	0	0	0	0	3	0	0	0	0	0	0	0
LK	(Wales) Roy Osborn	0	0	0	0	0	0	1+1	0	0	0	0	0	0	0	0	0	0	0	1+1	0	0	0	0	0	0	0
LK	(Wales) Ellis Lloyd	0	0	0	0	0	0	0+1	0	0	0	0	0	0	0	0	0	0	0	0+1	0	0	0	0	0	0	0
HK	(Wales) Ken Owens	10	2	0	0	0	10	1	0	0	0	0	0	0	0	0	0	0	0	12	2	0	0	0	10	1	0
HK	(Wales) Emyr Phillips	5+5	1	0	0	0	5	0	0	0	0	0	0	4	0	0	0	0	0	9+5	1	0	0	0	5	1	0
HK	(Wales) Darran Harris	0+1	0	0	0	0	0	1+2	0	0	0	0	0	0+1	0	0	0	0	0	1+4	0	0	0	0	0	0	0
HK	(Wales) Kirby Myhill	5+3	0	0	0	0	0	1	0	0	0	0	0	0+3	0	0	0	0	0	6+6	0	0	0	0	0	0	0
HK	(Wales) Ryan Elias	2+7	0	0	0	0	0	1+1	0	0	0	0	0	2	0	0	0	0	0	5+8	0	0	0	0	0	0	0
HK	(Wales) Torin Myhill	0+1	0	0	0	0	0	0+1	0	0	0	0	0	0	0	0	0	0	0	0+2	0	0	0	0	0	0	0
PR	(Wales) Rhodri Jones	4+3	0	0	0	0	0	0	0	0	0	0	0	0+3	0	0	0	0	0	4+7	0	0	0	0	0	0	0
PR	(Wales) Phil John	10+7	0	0	0	0	0	2	0	0	0	0	0	0+3	0	0	0	0	0	12+10	0	0	0	0	0	1	0
PR	(Wales) Rob Evans	12+5	0	0	0	0	0	0	0	0	0	0	0	6	1	0	0	0	5	18+5	1	0	0	0	5	0	0
PR	(Wales) Peter Edwards	12+5	0	0	0	0	0	2	0	0	0	0	0	2	0	0	0	0	0	16+5	0	0	0	0	0	0	0
PR	(Wales) Samson Lee	5+1	0	0	0	0	0	0	0	0	0	0	0	4	0	0	0	0	0	9+1	0	0	0	0	0	0	0
PR	(South Africa) Jacobie Adriaanse	1+10	0	0	0	0	0	0+2	0	0	0	0	0	0+1	0	0	0	0	0	1+13	0	0	0	0	0	0	0
PR	(Wales) Wyn Jones	0+7	0	0	0	0	0	1+2	0	0	0	0	0	0+2	0	0	0	0	0	1+11	0	0	0	0	0	0	0
PR	(Wales) Ben Leung	0	0	0	0	0	0	2	0	0	0	0	0	0	0	0	0	0	0	2	0	0	0	0	0	0	0
PR	(Wales) Rhys Thomas	0	0	0	0	0	0	1	0	0	0	0	0	0	0	0	0	0	0	1	0	0	0	0	0	0	0
PR	(Wales) Javan Sebastian	0	0	0	0	0	0	0+1	0	0	0	0	0	0	0	0	0	0	0	0+1	0	0	0	0	0	0	0

Stats accurate as of match played 16 May 2015
