= 2012–13 Scarlets season =

Season 10 of Scarlets Welsh regional rugby union

Scarlets
- 2012–13 season
- Head coach: Simon Easterby
- Chief executive: Mark Davies
- Pro12: 4th
- LV Cup: Group stage, 3rd
- Heineken Cup: Group stage, 4th
- Top try scorer: League: George North – 9 All: Andy Fenby – 11
- Top points scorer: League: Owen Williams – 108; All: Owen Williams – 142
- Highest home attendance: 14,111 vs Ospreys (21 September 2012)
- Lowest home attendance: 5,757 vs Zebre (3 November 2012)
- Average home attendance: 8,114

The 2012–13 season is the 10th in the history of the Scarlets Welsh regional rugby union side. In this season, they competed in the Pro12, the Heineken Cup and the LV Cup.

At the end of the season, Jonathan Davies and George North were called up to the British & Irish Lions squad for the 2013 tour to Australia.

== Pre-season and friendlies ==
Date	Opponents	H / A	Result F–A	Scorers	Attendance
10 August 2012	Narbonne	A	17–8	Try: Fenby; Penalty: Newton	
18 August 2012	Worcester Warriors	A	22–7	Try: Reynolds; Conversion: Newton	
25 August 2012	London Welsh	H	23–17	Tries: Fenby (2), S. Williams; Conversion: J. Williams; Penalties: A. Thomas (2)	4,000

== RaboDirect PRO12 ==
=== Fixtures ===
Date	Opponents	H / A	Result F–A	Scorers	Attendance	Table position
1 September 2012	Leinster	H	45–20	Tries: S. Williams 14', Li. Williams 26', North 42', 73', Fenby 48', 76', Murphy 64'; Conversions: A. Thomas 15', 27', 50', Priestland 74', 77'	6,559	2nd
7 September 2012	Glasgow	A	18–13	Tries: Shingler 23', Fenby 38', North 57'; Penalty:Priestland 46'	4,383	1st
15 September 2012	Connacht	A	24–11	Tries: J. Williams 41', 51', North 49', J. Davies 80'; Conversions: Priestland 42', J. Williams 80+1	4,074	1st
21 September 2012	Ospreys	H	16–23	Try: North 80'; Conversion: Priestland 80+2'; Penalties: Priestland 4', 14', 48'	14,111	1st
29 September 2012	Benetton Treviso	A	20–22	Tries: Fenby 26', 38', Conversions: Priestland 27', 39'; Drop goal: Priestland 13'	3,500	2nd
5 October 2012	Dragons	H	24–13	Tries: Maule 26', Stoddart 71'; Conversion: A. Thomas 27'; Penalties: A. Thomas 16', 35', 38', Priestland 66'	7,863	2nd
26 October 2012	Edinburgh	A	29–28	Tries: North 14', 32', Reynolds 20', G. Davies 40+1'; Conversions: A. Thomas 15', 21', 40+1; Penalty: Priestland 78'	3,754	2nd
3 November 2012	Zebre	H	22–13	Try: K. Phillips 73'; Conversion: A. Thomas 75'; Penalties: A. Thomas 35', 48', 54', 67', 78'	5,757	2nd
25 November 2012	Munster	A	13–6	Try: Fenby 71'; Conversion: A. Thomas 72'; Penalties: A. Thomas 29', 68'	6,219	2nd
2 December 2012	Ulster	H	12–19	Penalties: A. Thomas 20', 49', 53', 80+2'	7,089	2nd
21 December 2012	Cardiff Blues	A	9–6	Penalties: A. Thomas 5', 10', 39'	9,872	2nd
26 December 2012	Ospreys	A	3–32	Penalty: A. Thomas 27'	19,443	2nd
4 January 2013	Ulster	A	17–47	Tries: Turnbull 67', S. Williams 80+1; Conversions: A. Thomas 68', S. Williams 80+2'; Penalty: A. Thomas 9'	10,977	5th
8 February 2013	Connacht	H	25–15	Try: Snyman 53'; Conversion: O. Williams 54'; Penalties: O. Williams 5', 20', 36', 40', 63', 72'	5,886	5th
16 February 2013	Munster	H	18–10	Penalties: O. Williams 14', 19', 38', 50', 57'; Drop goal: O. Williams 63'	7,124	4th
23 February 2013	Leinster	A	5–32	Try: Fenby 37'	15,000	5th
1 March 2013	Edinburgh	H	14–13	Try: Fenby 14'; Penalties: A. Thomas 9', 52', O. Williams 67'	6,314	4th
22 March 2013	Zebre	A	24–10	Tries: Li. Williams 40+2', Snyman 47'; Conversion: O. Williams 49'; Penalties: O. Williams 19', 33', 45', 53'	1,100	5th
30 March 2013	Dragons	A	28–20	Tries: North 26', 68', J. Davies 66'; Conversions: O. Williams 27', 67'; Penalties: O. Williams 19', 25', 58'	36,174	5th
12 April 2013	Glasgow	H	29–6	Tries: Owens 18', Li. Williams 46'; Conversions: O. Williams 19', 48'; Penalties: O. Williams 4', 14', 51', 60'; Drop Goal: O. Williams 24'	6,901	4th
20 April 2013	Cardiff Blues	A	24–6	Tries: J. Davies 25', 58', Li. Williams 66'; Conversions: O. Williams 26', 60', Priestland 67'; Penalty: O. Williams 40+2'	10,426	4th
3 May 2013	Benetton Treviso	H	17–41	Try: Li. Williams 80'; Penalties: O. Williams 4', 13', 19', 33'	9,129	4th

=== Play-off ===
Date	Opponents	H / A	Result F–A	Scorers	Attendance
10 May 2013	Ulster	A	17–28	Tries: G. Davies 61', Timani 78'; Conversions: O. Williams 61', 79'; Penalty: O. Williams 5'	

=== Table ===
Pos	Club	Pld	W	D	L	F	A	PD	BP	Pts
3	(Scotland) Glasgow Warriors	22	16	0	6	541	324	217	12	76
4	(Wales) Scarlets	22	15	0	7	436	406	30	6	66
5	(Wales) Ospreys	22	14	1	7	471	342	129	4	62

== Anglo-Welsh Cup ==
=== Fixtures ===
Date	Opponents	H / A	Result F–A	Scorers	Attendance	Pool position
10 November 2012	Worcester Warriors	A	18–34	Tries: Fenby 17', K. Phillips 77'; Conversion: O. Williams 18'; Penalties: O. Williams 7', 12'		4th
17 November 2012	Cardiff Blues	H	22–16	Try: Penalty try 35'; Conversion: Owen 36'; Penalties: Owen 9', Li. Williams 40+2', A. Thomas 65', 68', 71	6,469	4th
26 January 2013	Sale	A	17–36	Tries: Fenby 4', G. Davies 21'; Conversions: O. Williams 5', 22'; Penalty: O. Williams 49'	3,108	4th
3 February 2013	Leicester Tigers	H	40–19	Tries: Fenby 70', Owen 77', Reynolds 79'; Conversions: A. Thomas 71', 78'; Penalties: O. Williams 7', 15', 19', 22', 35', 45', 60'	6,496	3rd

=== Table ===
Pool 3

Club	Pld	W	D	L	F	A	PD	BP	Pts
Saracens	4	3	0	1	102	69	33	2	14
London Irish	4	2	0	2	101	84	17	4	12
Scarlets	4	2	0	2	97	105	−8	0	8
London Wasps	4	1	0	2	83	108	−25	2	6

== Heineken Cup ==
=== Fixtures ===
Date	Opponents	H / A	Result F–A	Scorers	Attendance	Pool position
13 October 2012	ASM Clermont Auvergne	A	16–49	Try: J. Davies 3'; Conversion: Priestland 4'; Penalties: Priestland 19' 47'; Drop goal: Priestland 22'	17,520	4th
20 October 2012	Leinster	H	13–20	Try: Maule 55'; Conversion: Priestland 55'; Penalties: Priestland 47', 74'	9,555	4th
8 December 2012	Exeter Chiefs	H	16–22	Try: Penalty try 67'; Conversion: A. Thomas 68'; Penalties: Priestland 8', 30'	7,512	4th
15 December 2012	Exeter Chiefs	A	20–30	Tries: Owens 35', S. Williams 43'; Conversions: A. Thomas 36', 44'; Penalties: A. Thomas 12', 26'	9,258	4th
12 January 2013	Leinster	A	14–33	Try: Li. Williams 40+4'; Penalties: A. Thomas 4', 58'; Drop goal: Li. Williams 13'	18,200	4th
19 January 2013	ASM Clermont Auvergne	H	0–29		7,167	4th

=== Table ===
Pool 5

Team	Pld	W	D	L	F	A	PD	BP	Pts
(France) ASM Clermont Auvergne	6	6	0	0	213	64	149	4	28
(Ireland) Leinster Rugby	6	4	0	2	124	96	28	4	20
(England) Exeter Chiefs	6	2	0	4	93	166	−73	1	9
(Wales) Scarlets	6	0	0	6	79	183	−104	2	2

== Transfers ==
=== In ===
Date confirmed	Pos.	Name	From
21 May 2012	WG	(Wales) Kristian Phillips	Ospreys
22 May 2012	LK	(South Africa) George Earle	Cheetahs
30 June 2012	LK	(Argentina) Tomás Vallejos	Harlequins
9 July 2012	FB	(Wales) Gareth Owen	Ospreys
17 August 2012	LK	(Australia) / (Wales) Jake Ball	Western Force
25 August 2012	PR	(South Africa) Jacobie Adriaanse	Lions
24 September 2012	LK	(South Africa) Johan Snyman	Eastern Province Kings

=== Out ===
Date confirmed	Pos.	Name	To
5 March 2012	N8	(England) Ben Morgan	Gloucester
11 April 2012	FH	(Wales) Stephen Jones	London Wasps
4 May 2012	FB	(Wales) Dan Evans	Released/Newport Gwent Dragons
4 May 2012	LK	(Wales) Lou Reed	Released/Cardiff Blues
10 May 2012	LK	(England) Damian Welch	Exeter Chiefs
7 January 2013	WG/FB	(Wales) Morgan Stoddart	Retired
28 February 2013	LK	(Argentina) Tomás Vallejos	Released/Pampas XV

== Statistics ==
Pos.	Name	Celtic League						Anglo-Welsh Cup						Europe						Total						Discipline	
Pos.	Name	Apps	Try	Con	Pen	Drop	Pts	Apps	Try	Con	Pen	Drop	Pts	Apps	Try	Con	Pen	Drop	Pts	Apps	Try	Con	Pen	Drop	Pts	Yellow card	Red card
FB/WG	(Wales) Liam Williams	16	5	0	0	0	25	1	0	0	1	0	3	6	1	0	0	1	8	23	6	0	1	1	36	2	0
FB/WG	(Wales) Morgan Stoddart	2+1	1	0	0	0	5	0	0	0	0	0	0	2+1	0	0	0	0	0	4+2	1	0	0	0	5	0	1
FB/FH	(Wales) Jordan Williams	2	2	1	0	0	12	0	0	0	0	0	0	0	0	0	0	0	0	2	2	1	0	0	12	0	0
FB/FH	(Wales) Daniel Newton	2+1	0	0	0	0	0	1	0	0	0	0	0	1+1	0	0	0	0	0	4+2	0	0	0	0	0	0	0
FB/FH/CE	(Wales) Gareth Owen	7+4	0	0	0	0	0	3+1	1	1	1	0	10	0	0	0	0	0	0	10+5	1	1	1	0	10	1	1
FB	(Wales) Dale Ford	0+1	0	0	0	0	0	0+2	0	0	0	0	0	0	0	0	0	0	0	0+3	0	0	0	0	0	0	0
WG/FB	(Wales) Andy Fenby	18	8	0	0	0	40	4	3	0	0	0	15	3	0	0	0	0	0	25	11	0	0	0	55	1	0
WG	(Wales) George North	14	9	0	0	0	45	0	0	0	0	0	0	4	0	0	0	0	0	18	9	0	0	0	45	0	0
WG	(Wales) Kristian Phillips	5+2	1	0	0	0	5	3	1	0	0	0	5	2+1	0	0	0	0	0	10+3	2	0	0	0	10	0	0
WG	(Wales) Lee Williams	0	0	0	0	0	0	1	0	0	0	0	0	0	0	0	0	0	0	1	0	0	0	0	0	0	0
WG	(Wales) Kyle Evans	0	0	0	0	0	0	1	0	0	0	0	0	0	0	0	0	0	0	1	0	0	0	0	0	0	0
WG/CE	(Wales) Nic Reynolds	7+1	1	0	0	0	5	1+3	1	0	0	0	5	0+1	0	0	0	0	0	8+5	2	0	0	0	10	0	0
CE	(Wales) Gareth Maule	10+8	1	0	0	0	5	3	0	0	0	0	0	3+1	1	0	0	0	5	16+9	2	0	0	0	10	0	0
CE	(Wales) Scott Williams	13+1	2	1	0	0	12	0	0	0	0	0	0	5	1	0	0	0	0	18+1	3	1	0	0	17	0	0
CE	(Wales) Jonathan Davies	12+1	4	0	0	0	20	0	0	0	0	0	0	4+1	1	0	0	0	5	16+2	5	0	0	0	25	0	0
CE	(Wales) Adam Warren	5+4	0	0	0	0	0	3	0	0	0	0	0	1+1	0	0	0	0	0	9+5	0	0	0	0	0	0	0
FH/CE	(Wales) Owen Williams	9+1	0	8	28	2	108	3	0	3	10	0	36	0	0	0	0	0	0	12+1	0	11	38	2	142	1	0
FH/CE	(Wales) Aled Thomas	11+5	0	12	22	0	90	0+2	0	2	3	0	13	3+2	0	3	4	0	18	14+9	0	17	29	0	118	2	0
FH	(Wales) Rhys Priestland	4+5	0	7	7	1	36	0	0	0	0	0	0	3	0	2	6	1	25	7+5	0	9	13	2	65	0	0
SH	(Wales) Gareth Davies	6+12	2	0	0	0	10	1+2	1	0	0	0	5	0+4	0	0	0	0	0	7+18	3	0	0	0	15	1	0
SH	(Wales) Tavis Knoyle	6+1	0	0	0	0	0	0	0	0	0	0	0	4+2	0	0	0	0	0	10+3	0	0	0	0	0	0	1
SH	(Wales) Aled Davies	11+2	0	0	0	0	0	2+1	0	0	0	0	0	2	0	0	0	0	0	15+3	0	0	0	0	0	0	0
SH	(Wales) Rhodri Williams	0+3	0	0	0	0	0	1+1	0	0	0	0	0	0	0	0	0	0	0	1+4	0	0	0	0	0	0	0
N8	(Wales) Kieran Murphy	8+5	1	0	0	0	5	4	1	0	0	0	0	3	0	0	0	0	0	15+5	1	0	0	0	5	0	0
FL	(Wales) Josh Turnbull	15+2	1	0	0	0	5	0	0	0	0	0	0	4	0	0	0	0	0	19+2	1	0	0	0	5	0	0
FL/N8	(Wales) Rob McCusker	16+2	0	0	0	0	0	0	0	0	0	0	0	4	0	0	0	0	0	20+2	0	0	0	0	0	1	1
FL	(Wales) Johnathan Edwards	12+3	0	0	0	0	0	1+1	0	0	0	0	0	2+1	0	0	0	0	0	15+5	0	0	0	0	0	0	0
FL	(Wales) Daniel Thomas	0+1	0	0	0	0	0	1+1	0	0	0	0	0	0	0	0	0	0	0	1+2	0	0	0	0	0	0	0
FL	(Wales) Duane Eager	0	0	0	0	0	0	1+1	0	0	0	0	0	0	0	0	0	0	0	1+1	0	0	0	0	0	0	0
FL	(Wales) Lewis Rawlins	0+1	0	0	0	0	0	2	0	0	0	0	0	0	0	0	0	0	0	2+1	0	0	0	0	0	0	0
LK/FL	(Wales) Craig Price	1+2	0	0	0	0	0	2	0	0	0	0	0	0	0	0	0	0	0	3+2	0	0	0	0	0	0	0
LK/FL	(Wales) Aaron Shingler	15+1	1	0	0	0	5	0	0	0	0	0	0	3+1	0	0	0	0	0	18+2	1	0	0	0	5	1	0
LK/FL	(Argentina) Tomás Vallejos	2+2	0	0	0	0	0	0+1	0	0	0	0	0	0+3	0	0	0	0	0	2+6	0	0	0	0	0	0	0
LK	(Wales) Richard Kelly	7+3	0	0	0	0	0	0+2	0	0	0	0	0	3+2	0	0	0	0	0	10+7	0	0	0	0	0	0	0
LK	(South Africa) George Earle	18	0	0	0	0	0	0+1	0	0	0	0	0	5	0	0	0	0	0	23+1	0	0	0	0	0	2	0
LK	(Tonga) Sione Timani	5+12	1	0	0	0	5	1	0	0	0	0	0	2+1	0	0	0	0	0	8+13	1	0	0	0	5	0	0
LK	(South Africa) Jake Ball	3+7	0	0	0	0	0	4	0	0	0	0	0	0	0	0	0	0	0	10+7	0	0	0	0	0	1	0
LK	(South Africa) Johan Snyman	14+1	2	0	0	0	10	4	0	0	0	0	0	3+3	0	0	0	0	0	21+4	2	0	0	0	10	1	0
LK	(Wales) Joel Galley	0	0	0	0	0	0	0+1	0	0	0	0	0	0	0	0	0	0	0	0+1	0	0	0	0	0	0	0
HK	(Wales) Ken Owens	6+6	1	0	0	0	5	0	0	0	0	0	0	2+3	1	0	0	0	5	8+9	2	0	0	0	10	0	0
HK	(Wales) Matthew Rees	8+7	0	0	0	0	0	0	0	0	0	0	0	3+2	0	0	0	0	0	11+9	0	0	0	0	0	0	0
HK	(Wales) Kirby Myhill	1+4	0	0	0	0	0	2+2	0	0	0	0	0	0	0	0	0	0	0	3+6	0	0	0	0	0	0	0
HK	(Wales) Emyr Phillips	8+3	0	0	0	0	0	2+1	0	0	0	0	0	0	0	0	0	0	0	10+4	0	0	0	0	0	1	0
HK	(Wales) Richard Wilkes	0	0	0	0	0	0	0+1	0	0	0	0	0	0	0	0	0	0	0	0+1	0	0	0	0	0	0	0
PR	(Wales) Samson Lee	11+7	0	0	0	0	0	1	0	0	0	0	0	5+1	0	0	0	0	0	17+8	0	0	0	0	0	1	0
PR	(Wales) Rhodri Jones	2+11	0	0	0	0	0	2	0	0	0	0	0	0+3	0	0	0	0	0	4+14	0	0	0	0	0	1	0
PR	(Wales) Phil John	21+2	0	0	0	0	0	0+1	0	0	0	0	0	5	0	0	0	0	0	26+3	0	0	0	0	0	0	0
PR	(Wales) Peter Edwards	0+4	0	0	0	0	0	0+2	0	0	0	0	0	0	0	0	0	0	0	0+6	0	0	0	0	0	0	0
PR	(Fiji) Deacon Manu	7+9	0	0	0	0	0	1+1	0	0	0	0	0	0+3	0	0	0	0	0	8+13	0	0	0	0	0	0	0
PR	(Wales) Shaun Hopkins	0+6	0	0	0	0	0	2+1	0	0	0	0	0	1+1	0	0	0	0	0	3+8	0	0	0	0	0	0	0
PR	(South Africa) Jacobie Adriaanse	6+4	0	0	0	0	0	1+2	0	0	0	0	0	1+2	0	0	0	0	0	8+8	0	0	0	0	0	0	0
PR	(Wales) Gareth Thomas	0	0	0	0	0	0	0+1	0	0	0	0	0	0	0	0	0	0	0	0+1	0	0	0	0	0	0	0
PR	(Wales) Rob Evans	0	0	0	0	0	0	0+1	0	0	0	0	0	0	0	0	0	0	0	0+1	0	0	0	0	0	0	0

Stats accurate as of match played 20 April 2013
