= 2022–23 Scarlets season =

Scarlets
- 2022–23 season
- Head coach: Dwayne Peel
- Chairman: Simon Muderack
- United Rugby Championship: 14th (Welsh Shield: 3rd)
- Challenge Cup: Semi-finals
- Top try scorer: League: Ryan Conbeer; Steff Evans; 6 tries each All: Steff Evans; 12 tries
- Top points scorer: League: Sam Costelow; 102 points All: Sam Costelow; 164 points
- Highest home attendance: 13,077 v Glasgow Warriors (Challenge Cup, 29 April 2023)
- Lowest home attendance: 4,345 v Zebre (URC, 15 October 2022)
- Average home attendance: 7,630

The 2022–23 season is the 19th season in the history of the Scarlets, a Welsh regional rugby union side based in Llanelli, Carmarthenshire. In this season, they are competing in the United Rugby Championship and the European Rugby Challenge Cup.

== Friendlies ==
Date	Opponents	H / A	Result F–A	Scorers	Attendance
2 September 2022	Bristol Bears	H	28–34	Tries: S. Williams 5' c, Fifita 25' c, Hughes 32' c, Lezana 55' c Conversions: D. Jones (4) 5', 25', 32', 55'	
9 September 2022 (Note: Match was cancelled following the death of Queen Elizabeth II.)	Dragons	H			
10 March 2023	Saracens	A	26–47	Tries: S. Thomas 9' c, Tuipulotu 13' c, Shenton 66' m, D. Jones 69' c Conversions: D. Jones (3) 10', 14', 70'	

== United Rugby Championship ==
=== Fixtures ===
Date	Opponents	H / A	Result F–A	Scorers	Attendance	Table position
17 September 2022	Ospreys	H	23–23	Tries: J. Williams 53' c, Costelow 65' c Conversions: Costelow (2) 54', 65'; Penalties: Costelow (3) 13', 42', 44'	9,582	8th
24 September 2022	Ulster	H	39–55	Tries: J. Davies 18' c, Conbeer 20' m, Fifita 41' c, Hughes (2) 53' c, 62' c Conversions: Costelow (3) 19', 42', 54', Patchell 63'; Penalties: Costelow 24', Patchell 67'	6,171	14th
1 October 2022	Benetton	A	23–34	Tries: Kalamafoni 63' c, J. Williams 69' c Conversions: Patchell (2) 64', 69'; Penalties: Halfpenny (3) 34', 39' 51'	3,456	15th
8 October 2022	Cardiff	H	10–16	Tries: McNicholl 71' c Conversions: Halfpenny 72'; Penalties: Halfpenny 22'	7,180	15th
15 October 2022	Zebre	H	36–12	Tries: Costelow (2) 5' c, 42' c, Lousi 28' c, J. Davies 39' c, Conbeer 78' m Conversions: Halfpenny (4) 7', 29', 40', 43'; Penalties: Halfpenny 72'	4,345	13th
21 October 2022	Connacht	A	14–36	Tries: St. Evans 14' m Penalties: Costelow (2) 4', 30', Patchell 58'	4,100	15th
29 October 2022	Leinster	H	5–35	Tries: St. Evans 20' m	6,823	15th
25 November 2022	Stormers	A	19–36	Tries: Conbeer (2) 31' c, 53' m, Rogers 49' c Conversions: D. Jones 32', Patchell 50'	12,543	15th
4 December 2022	Lions	A	15–32	Tries: Davis 32' m, Rogers 58' m, Lousi 82' m	4,010	15th
26 December 2022	Ospreys	A	14–34	Tries: Kalamafoni 30' c, McNicholl 48' c Conversions: Patchell (2) 31', 50'	11,480	15th
1 January 2023	Dragons	H	33–17	Tries: St. Evans 22' c, Blacker 58' c, McNicholl 81' c Conversions: Halfpenny (3) 23', 59', 83'; Penalties: Halfpenny (4) 4', 11', 38', 48'	8,566	15th
7 January 2023	Cardiff	A	28–22	Tries: Blacker 3' c, McNicholl 26' m, J. Davies 28' c Conversions: Halfpenny (2) 4', 30'; Penalties: Halfpenny (3) 44', 51', 71'	10,486	15th
27 January 2023	Bulls	H	37–28	Tries: Davis 9' c, Mathias 14' c, G. Davies 20' c, McNicholl 75' c Conversions: Costelow (3) 10', 15', 21', D. Jones 77'; Penalties: Costelow (3) 2', 31', 45'	6,711	14th
18 February 2023	Edinburgh	H	42–14	Tries: Conbeer (2) 5' c, 45' c, Fifita 11' c, St. Evans 30' c, G. Davies 49' c, James 75'c Conversions: Costelow (3) 6', 13', 32', D. Jones (3) 46', 49', 76'	7,531	14th
3 March 2023	Munster	A	42–49	Tries: Roberts 34' c, Fifita 46' c, Kalamafoni 53' c, Lousi 60' c, T. Davies 70' c, Rogers 76' c Conversions: Costelow (6) 35', 47', 54', 61', 71', 77'	8,008	14th
25 March 2023	Sharks	H	32–20	Tries: St. Evans (2) 8' c, 45' c Conversions: Costelow (2) 9', 45'; Penalties: Costelow (6) 13', 22', 52', 55', 71', 75'	7,956	13th
14 April 2023	Glasgow Warriors	A	9–12	Penalties: Dan Jones (3) 5', 12', 49'	6,815	14th
22 April 2023	Dragons	A	14–31	Tries: Hardy 23' c, Tuipulotu 69' c Conversions: Costelow (2) 23', 70'	41,139	14th

=== Tables ===
Overall

Pos	Team	Pld	W	D	L	F	A	PD	BP	Pts
13	(Wales) Ospreys	18	5	2	11	400	514	−114	11	35
14	(Wales) Scarlets	18	6	1	11	435	506	−71	8	34
15	(Wales) Dragons	18	4	0	14	391	534	−143	8	24

Welsh Shield

Pos	Team	Pld	W	D	L	F	A	PD	BP	Pts
1	(Wales) Cardiff	18	9	0	9	425	470	−45	8	44
2	(Wales) Ospreys	18	5	2	11	400	514	−114	11	35
3	(Wales) Scarlets	18	6	1	11	435	506	−71	8	34
4	(Wales) Dragons	18	4	0	14	391	534	−143	8	24

== European Rugby Challenge Cup ==
=== Pool stage ===
==== Fixtures ====
Date	Opponents	H / A	Result F–A	Scorers	Attendance	Table position
11 December 2022	Bayonne	H	39–7	Tries: Conbeer 6' c, Blacker 8' m, Lousi 39' c, Thomson 55' c, St. Evans 58' c Conversions: Costelow (4) 7', 40', 56', 59'; Penalties: Costelow (2) 13', 17'	6,357	1st
17 December 2022	Cheetahs	A	45–26	Tries: St. Evans (2) 11' c, 18' c, Conbeer 22' c, McNicholl 25' c, Lousi 38' c, Owens 78' c Conversions: Costelow (6) 12', 18', 23', 26', 39', 79'; Penalties: Costelow 6'	200	1st
13 January 2023	Cheetahs	H	20–17	Tries: St. Evans 22' c, McNicholl 54' c Conversions: Halfpenny (2) 24', 55'; Penalties: Halfpenny (2) 9', 63'	7,105	1st
21 January 2023	Bayonne	A	20–7	Tries: J. Davies 29' m, Roberts 35' m, St. Evans 50' c Conversions: Halfpenny 51'; Penalties: Halfpenny 9'	4,744	1st

==== Table ====
Pool B
Team	P	W	D	L	PF	PA	Diff	TF	TA	TB	LB	Pts
(Wales) Scarlets	4	4	0	0	124	57	+67	16	8	2	0	18
(Italy) Benetton	4	3	0	1	120	70	+50	16	10	3	0	15
(South Africa) Lions	4	2	1	1	98	85	+13	11	11	2	0	12
(France) Stade Français	4	2	0	2	85	86	–1	11	10	1	1	10
(Wales) Dragons	4	1	1	2	98	103	–5	12	11	2	2	10
(South Africa) Cheetahs	4	2	0	2	73	87	–14	8	9	1	1	10
(France) Pau	4	1	0	3	64	72	–8	6	6	0	3	7
(France) Bayonne	4	0	0	4	28	130	–102	4	19	0	0	0
Green background (rows 1 to 6) are qualification places for the Challenge Cup round of 16. Starting table — source: EPCR

=== Knockout stage ===
Date	Round	Opponents	H / A	Result F–A	Scorers	Attendance
31 March 2023	Round of 16	Brive	H	19–7	Tries: Fifita 50' m, Shingler 78' m Penalties: Costelow (3) 3', 15', 28'	7,784
7 April 2023	Quarter-final	Clermont Auvergne	H	32–30	Tries: Halfpenny 7' m, Costelow 14' c, J. Williams 36' c, Conbeer 75' c Conversions: Halfpenny 15', Costelow (2) 37', 76'; Penalties: Halfpenny 6', Costelow 68'	7,634
29 April 2023	Semi-final	Glasgow Warriors	H	17–35	Tries: St. Evans 31' m Penalties: Costelow (4) 24', 28', 40', 46'	13,077

== Statistics ==
(+ in the Apps column denotes substitute appearance, positions listed are the ones they have started a game in during the season)

Pos.	Name	United Rugby Championship						European Challenge Cup						Total						Discipline	
Pos.	Name	Apps	Try	Con	Pen	Drop	Pts	Apps	Try	Con	Pen	Drop	Pts	Apps	Try	Con	Pen	Drop	Pts	Yellow card	Red card
FB	(Wales) Leigh Halfpenny	5	0	10	12	0	56	3+1	1	4	4	0	25	8+1	1	14	16	0	81	0	0
FB	(Wales) Johnny McNicholl	13+2	5	0	0	0	25	5	2	0	0	0	10	18+2	7	0	0	0	35	1	0
FB	(Wales) Ioan Nicholas	6+1	0	0	0	0	0	2+4	0	0	0	0	0	8+5	0	0	0	0	0	0	0
WG	(Wales) Corey Baldwin	3+1	0	0	0	0	0	0	0	0	0	0	0	3+1	0	0	0	0	0	0	0
WG	(Wales) Ryan Conbeer	15	6	0	0	0	30	5	3	0	0	0	15	20	9	0	0	0	45	1	0
WG	(Wales) Steff Evans	12+4	6	0	0	0	30	6+1	6	0	0	0	30	18+5	12	0	0	0	60	0	0
WG/FB	(Wales) Tom Rogers	8	3	0	0	0	15	2	0	0	0	0	0	10	3	0	0	0	15	0	0
CE	(Wales) Jonathan Davies	11+1	3	0	0	0	15	3	1	0	0	0	5	14+1	4	0	0	0	20	0	0
CE	(Wales) Eddie James	1+1	1	0	0	0	5	0	0	0	0	0	0	1+1	1	0	0	0	5	0	0
CE	(Wales) Joe Roberts	6+1	1	0	0	0	5	5	1	0	0	0	5	11+1	2	0	0	0	10	1	0
CE	(Wales) Johnny Williams	5+1	2	0	0	0	10	3	1	0	0	0	5	8+1	3	0	0	0	15	0	0
CE	(Wales) Scott Williams	4+1	0	0	0	0	0	1	0	0	0	0	0	5+1	0	0	0	0	0	0	0
FH	(Wales) Sam Costelow	12	3	21	15	0	102	6+1	1	12	11	0	62	18+1	4	33	26	0	164	3	0
FH	(Wales) Dan Jones	4+7	0	5	3	0	19	0	0	0	0	0	0	4+7	0	5	3	0	19	1	0
FH/FB	(Wales) Rhys Patchell	2+9	0	6	2	0	18	1+4	0	0	0	0	0	3+13	0	6	2	0	18	0	0
SH	(Wales) Dane Blacker	4+7	2	0	0	0	10	3	1	0	0	0	5	7+7	3	0	0	0	15	0	0
SH	(Wales) Gareth Davies	9+3	2	0	0	0	10	4+1	0	0	0	0	0	12+4	2	0	0	0	10	2	0
SH	(Wales) Kieran Hardy	5+5	1	0	0	0	5	0+6	0	0	0	0	0	5+11	1	0	0	0	5	0	0
SH	(Wales) Archie Hughes	0+1	0	0	0	0	0	0	0	0	0	0	0	0+1	0	0	0	0	0	0	0
N8/FL	(Tonga) Sione Kalamafoni	14+1	3	0	0	0	15	3+1	0	0	0	0	0	17+2	3	0	0	0	15	2	1
N8	(Wales) Carwyn Tuipulotu	3+5	1	0	0	0	5	2+2	0	0	0	0	0	5+7	1	0	0	0	5	1	0
N8	(Wales) Ben Williams	0+1	0	0	0	0	0	0	0	0	0	0	0	0+1	0	0	0	0	0	0	0
FL	(Wales) Dan Davis	8	2	0	0	0	10	3	0	0	0	0	0	11	2	0	0	0	10	0	0
FL/HK	(Wales) Shaun Evans	5+5	0	0	0	0	0	0+5	0	0	0	0	0	5+10	0	0	0	0	0	0	0
FL	(Argentina) Tomas Lezana	2+2	0	0	0	0	0	0+3	0	0	0	0	0	2+5	0	0	0	0	0	0	1
FL	(Wales) Josh Macleod	8+1	0	0	0	0	0	5	0	0	0	0	0	13+1	0	0	0	0	0	0	0
FL	(Wales) Iestyn Rees	0+1	0	0	0	0	0	0+1	0	0	0	0	0	0+2	0	0	0	0	0	0	0
FL	(Wales) Iwan Shenton	2+1	0	0	0	0	0	0	0	0	0	0	0	2+1	0	0	0	0	0	0	0
FL	(Wales) Dan Thomas	2	0	0	0	0	0	0	0	0	0	0	0	2	0	0	0	0	0	1	0
FL	(Scotland) Blade Thomson	4+1	0	0	0	0	0	1	1	0	0	0	5	5+1	1	0	0	0	5	1	0
FL/LK	(Wales) Aaron Shingler	7+2	0	0	0	0	0	5	1	0	0	0	5	16+2	1	0	0	0	5	1	0
FL	(Wales) Luca Giannini	0+1	0	0	0	0	0	0	0	0	0	0	0	0+1	0	0	0	0	0	0	0
LK	(New Zealand) Vaea Fifita	14	3	0	0	0	15	6	1	0	0	0	5	20	4	0	0	0	20	4	1
LK	(Wales) Josh Helps	0	0	0	0	0	0	0	0	0	0	0	0	0	0	0	0	0	0	0	0
LK	(Wales) Morgan Jones	3+7	0	0	0	0	0	2+1	0	0	0	0	0	5+8	0	0	0	0	0	0	0
LK	(Tonga) Sam Lousi	12	3	0	0	0	15	7	2	0	0	0	10	19	5	0	0	0	25	0	1
LK	(Wales) Jac Price	3+1	0	0	0	0	0	0+1	0	0	0	0	0	3+2	0	0	0	0	0	0	0
LK	(England) Tom Price	6+3	0	0	0	0	0	0+2	0	0	0	0	0	6+5	0	0	0	0	0	0	0
LK	(Wales) Lewis Rawlins	0	0	0	0	0	0	0	0	0	0	0	0	0	0	0	0	0	0	0	0
HK	(Wales) Taylor Davies	1+4	1	0	0	0	5	0	0	0	0	0	0	1+4	1	0	0	0	5	0	0
HK	(Wales) Ryan Elias	4+2	0	0	0	0	0	2	0	0	0	0	0	6+2	0	0	0	0	0	0	0
HK	(Wales) Dafydd Hughes	3+4	2	0	0	0	10	0	0	0	0	0	0	3+4	2	0	0	0	10	0	0
HK	(Wales) Ken Owens	5+3	0	0	0	0	0	5+2	1	0	0	0	5	10+5	1	0	0	0	5	0	0
PR	(Wales) WillGriff John	3+3	0	0	0	0	0	2	0	0	0	0	0	5+3	0	0	0	0	0	0	0
PR	(Wales) Wyn Jones	2+4	0	0	0	0	0	2+3	0	0	0	0	0	4+7	0	0	0	0	0	0	0
PR	(Wales) Samson Lee	0	0	0	0	0	0	0	0	0	0	0	0	0	0	0	0	0	0	0	0
PR	(Wales) Kemsley Mathias	7+4	1	0	0	0	5	5+2	0	0	0	0	0	12+6	1	0	0	0	5	0	0
PR	(Wales) Harri O'Connor	4+5	0	0	0	0	0	0+1	0	0	0	0	0	4+6	0	0	0	0	0	0	0
PR	(Wales) Sam O'Connor	0+1	0	0	0	0	0	0	0	0	0	0	0	0+1	0	0	0	0	0	0	0
PR	(Wales) Phil Price	1	0	0	0	0	0	0	0	0	0	0	0	1	0	0	0	0	0	0	0
PR	(Scotland) Javan Sebastian	7+6	0	0	0	0	0	5+1	0	0	0	0	0	12+7	0	0	0	0	0	0	0
PR	(Wales) Steffan Thomas	8+9	0	0	0	0	0	0+2	0	0	0	0	0	8+11	0	0	0	0	0	1	0
PR	(Wales) Sam Wainwright	4+4	0	0	0	0	0	0+5	0	0	0	0	0	4+9	0	0	0	0	0	1	0

Stats correct as of match played 29 April 2023

== Transfers ==
=== In ===
Date confirmed	Pos.	Name	From	Ref.
26 January 2022	LK	(New Zealand) Vaea Fifita	(England) Wasps	
31 August 2022	FL	(Wales) Iwan Shenton	Aberavon	
31 August 2022	LK	(Wales) Griff Evans	Llandovery	
20 October 2022	FL	(Wales) Dan Thomas	(England) Bristol Bears (loan)	
18 November 2022	PR	(Wales) Sam Wainwright	(England) Saracens	

=== Out ===
Date confirmed	Pos.	Name	To	Ref.
6 January 2022	FB	(Wales) Liam Williams	Cardiff Rugby	
4 May 2022	FH	(Wales) Angus O'Brien	Dragons	
16 May 2022	PR	(Wales) Rob Evans	Dragons	
16 May 2022	CE	(Wales) Steffan Hughes	Dragons	
16 May 2022	HK	(Wales) Marc Jones	Retired	
16 May 2022	FB	(Wales) Tomi Lewis	(England) Jersey Reds	
16 May 2022	CE	(Wales) Tyler Morgan	(France) Biarritz	
16 May 2022	FL	(Wales) Tom Phillips	Llanelli RFC (Note: After being released, Phillips joined the Scarlets Academy as a development skills coach while still playing semi-professionally for Llanelli RFC.)	
23 November 2022	LK	(Wales) Josh Helps	Retired (Note: Although Helps announced his retirement from professional rugby, he still played semi-professionally for Carmarthen Quins.)	
16 February 2023	FL	(Scotland) Blade Thomson	Retired	
20 March 2023	FL	(Argentina) Tomas Lezana	(France) US Montauban	
20 April 2023	PR	(Wales) Alex Jeffries	Retired	
