= 2018 Pro14 Grand Final =

Rugby union match

- Event: 2017–18 Pro14
Leinster	Scarlets
(Ireland)	(Wales)
40	32
- Date: 26 May 2018
- Venue: Aviva Stadium, Dublin
- Man of the Match: Johnny Sexton (Leinster)
- Referee: Stuart Berry (South Africa)
- Attendance: 46,092
- Weather: Sunny

The 2018 Pro14 Grand Final was the final match of the 2017–18 Pro14 season. The 2017–18 season is the fourth with Guinness as the title sponsor, the ninth with a Grand Final and the first season with 14 teams, following the admission of two South African teams. The final was played at the Aviva Stadium in Dublin and saw Leinster defeat the Scarlets 40–32.

== Route to the final ==
The top side from each of the two conferences are given a bye to the semi-finals and have home advantage. Teams placed second and third in opposite conferences play each other to determine the other two semi-finalists with the team ranked second having home advantage.

The play-offs are scheduled in the four weeks after the regular season has been completed.

Quarter-finals
(Wales) Scarlets	43
(South Africa) Cheetahs	8
(Ireland) Munster	20
(Scotland) Edinburgh	16

Semi-finals
(Scotland) Glasgow Warriors	13
(Wales) Scarlets	28
(Ireland) Leinster	16
(Ireland) Munster	15

Pro14 Final
(Wales) Scarlets	32
(Ireland) Leinster	40

=== Quarter-finals ===
5 May 2018
15:15

Munster (Ireland)	20–16	(Scotland) Edinburgh
Try: Marshall 8' c Earls 42' c Con: Hanrahan (2/2) 9', 43'; Pen: Hanrahan (2/3) 51', 72'	Report	Try: Fowles 58' c Con: Van der Walt (1/1) 59'; Pen: Hidalgo-Clyne (3/3) 18', 24', 55'

Thomond Park
Attendance: 10,205
Referee: Nigel Owens (WRU)

5 May 2018
18:35

Scarlets (Wales)	43–8	(South Africa) Cheetahs
Try: S. Evans (2) 5' c, 36' c Halfpenny 16' c Prydie 44' c J.M. Davies 54' c J. Evans 60' m Con: Halfpenny (2/2) 6', 17'; Patchell (3/4) 37', 44', 56'; Pen: Halfpenny (1/2) 15'	Report	Try: Blommetjies 75' m Pen: Goosen (1/1) 21'

Parc y Scarlets
Attendance: 7,105
Referee: George Clancy (IRFU)

=== Semi-finals ===
18 May 2018
19:45

Glasgow Warriors (Scotland)	13–28	(Wales) Scarlets
Try: Gray 59' m Grigg 72' m Con: Russell (0/2); Pen: Russell (1/1) 13'	Report	Try: Patchell 3' c G. Davies 16' c R. Evans 31' c Owens 47' c Con: Patchell (4/4) 4', 17', 32', 48'

Scotstoun Stadium
Attendance: 10,000
Referee: John Lacey (IRFU)

19 May 2018
15:15

Leinster (Ireland)	16–15	(Ireland) Munster
Try: Conan 7' c Con: Carbery (1/1) 7'; Pen: R. Byrne (1/3) 20'; Carbery (1/2) 76'	Report	Try: Earls 43' m Grobler 78' c Con: Keatley (1/2) 78'; Pen: Hanrahan (1/2) 18'

RDS Arena
Attendance: 18,930
Referee: Stuart Berry (SARU)

== Final Match ==
26 May 2018
18:00

Leinster	40–32	Scarlets
Try: Toner 29' m Lowe 40'+2 c Cronin 51' c Larmour 57' m Conan 68' c Con: Sexton (2/4) 40'+4, 53'; Carbery (1/1) 69'; Pen: Sexton (3/3) 6', 15', 24'	Report	Try: McNicholl (3) 34' m, 64' c, 80' c Kruger 78' c Con: Halfpenny (2/3) 64', 80'+1; D. Jones (1/1) 78'; Pen: Halfpenny (2/2) 8', 12'

Aviva Stadium, Dublin
Attendance: 46,092
Referee: Stuart Berry (South Africa)

Leinster	Scarlets

FB	15	(Ireland) Rob Kearney
RW	14	(Ireland) Jordan Larmour
OC	13	(Ireland) Garry Ringrose
IC	12	(Fiji) Isa Nacewa (c)	(substituted off) 19'
LW	11	(Ireland) James Lowe
FH	10	(Ireland) Johnny Sexton	(substituted off) 63'
SH	9	(Ireland) Luke McGrath	(substituted off) 72'
N8	8	(Ireland) Jack Conan
OF	7	(Ireland) Dan Leavy	(substituted off) 66'
BF	6	(Ireland) Rhys Ruddock	(substituted off) 56'
RL	5	(Ireland) James Ryan
LL	4	(Ireland) Devin Toner
TP	3	(Ireland) Tadhg Furlong	(substituted off) 59'
HK	2	(Ireland) Seán Cronin	(substituted off) 59'
LP	1	(Ireland) Cian Healy	(substituted off) 51'
Substitutions:
HK	16	(Ireland) James Tracy	(substituted in) 59'
PR	17	(Ireland) Jack McGrath	(substituted in) 51'
PR	18	(Ireland) Andrew Porter	(substituted in) 59'
LK	19	(Australia) Scott Fardy	(substituted in) 56'
FL	20	(Ireland) Jordi Murphy	(substituted in) 66'
SH	21	(Ireland) Nick McCarthy	(substituted in) 72'
FH	22	(Ireland) Joey Carbery	(substituted in) 63'
CE	23	(Ireland) Rory O'Loughlin	(substituted in) 19'
Coach:
(Ireland) Leo Cullen

FB	15	(Wales) Leigh Halfpenny
RW	14	(Wales) Johnny McNicholl
OC	13	(Wales) Scott Williams
IC	12	(Wales) Hadleigh Parkes
LW	11	(Wales) Steff Evans	(substituted off) 71'
FH	10	(Wales) Rhys Patchell	(substituted off) 72'
SH	9	(Wales) Gareth Davies	(substituted off) 71'
N8	8	(Ireland) Tadhg Beirne
OF	7	(Wales) James Davies
BF	6	(Wales) Aaron Shingler	(substituted off) 38'
RL	5	(Australia) Steve Cummins
LL	4	(Wales) Lewis Rawlins	(substituted off) 63'
TP	3	(Wales) Samson Lee	(substituted off) 56'
HK	2	(Wales) Ken Owens (c)	(substituted off) 72'
LP	1	(Wales) Rob Evans	(substituted off) 59'
Substitutions:
HK	16	(Wales) Ryan Elias	(substituted in) 72'
PR	17	(Wales) Wyn Jones	(substituted in) 59'
PR	18	(South Africa) Werner Kruger	(substituted in) 56'
LK	19	(South Africa) David Bulbring	(substituted in) 63'
FL	20	(Wales) Will Boyde	(substituted in) 38'
SH	21	(Wales) Jonathan Evans	(substituted in) 71'
FH	22	(Wales) Dan Jones	(substituted in) 72'
WG	23	(Wales) Tom Prydie	(substituted in) 72'
Coach:
(New Zealand) Wayne Pivac

Man of the Match:
Johnny Sexton (Leinster)

Touch judges:
Marius Mitrea (Italy)
Mike Adamson (Scotland
Television match official:
Neil Paterson (Scotland)
