= Rory Pitman =

Welsh rugby union player

- Born: Rory Pitman; 6 October 1989 (age 37) Bridgend, Wales
- Height: 195 cm (6 ft 5 in)
- Weight: 128 kg (20 st 2 lb)
- School: Ysgol Llanhari

Rugby union career
- Position: Number 8
- Current team: Jersey Reds
Senior career
| Years | Team | Apps | (Points) |
| 2006-12 | Bridgend RFC | 35 | (20) |
| 2010-11 | Swansea RFC | 25 | (25) |
| 2012–13 | Rotherham | 14 | (0) |
| 2013–14 | Wasps | 4 | (0) |
| 2014 | → London Welsh (loan) | | |
| 2014-15 | Llanelli RFC | 1 | (0) |
| 2015-16 | Llandovery RFC | 1 | (0) |
| 2017- | Jersey Reds | 5 | (0) |
- Correct as of 4 January 2016 (UTC)
Provincial / State sides
| Years | Team | Apps | (Points) |
| 2007–12 | Ospreys | 1 | (0) |
| 2011 | → Glasgow (loan) | 4 | (0) |
| 2014–16 | Scarlets | 28 | (20) |
- Correct as of 4 January 2016 (UTC)
International career
| Years | Team | Apps | (Points) |
| 2009 | Wales U20 | | |
- Correct as of 4 January 2016 (UTC)
- Rugby league career

Playing information
- Position: Second-row
Club
| Years | Team | Pld | T | G | FG | P |
|---|---|---|---|---|---|---|
| 2012 | South Wales Scorpions | 1 | | | | 0 |

Rory Pitman (born 6 October 1989) is a Welsh rugby union footballer for the Jersey Reds.

Pitman played rugby league for the South Wales Scorpions in the Championship 1 as a second row, making one appearance for them in 2012.

Pitman joined the Welsh rugby union region the Ospreys but he was released by the Ospreys in July 2012.

On 6 June 2014, it was confirmed that Pitman would be joining the Welsh rugby region Scarlets for the 2014/15 season. In his Scarlets competitive début, he scored two tries and was awarded man of the match against Ulster. In November 2018, Pitman signed for Doncaster Knights on a short term deal, this leaving Cardiff RFC and Bridgend Sunday Football team Seagull FC.
