= Osian Williams (rugby union, born 2006) =

Welsh rugby union player

- Born: 18 September 2006 (age 20) Haverfordwest, Wales
- Height: 189 cm (6 ft 2 in)
- Weight: 105 kg (231 lb)
- School: Queen Elizabeth High School

Rugby union career
- Position: Flanker
- Current team: Scarlets
Youth career
- Haverfordwest RFC, Carmarthen Athletic RFC
Senior career
Years	Team	Apps	(Points)
2025–	Carmarthen Quins	6	(0)
2026–	Scarlets	1	
International career
Years	Team	Apps	(Points)
2026	Wales U20	3	(0)

Osian Williams (born 18 September 2006) is a Welsh rugby union player who plays for the Scarlets as a flanker.

== Early life ==
Born in Haverford, Williams attended Queen Elizabeth High School. Williams first played rugby for Haverfordwest RFC, and later Carmarthen Athletic RFC.

== Club career ==
=== Carmarthen Quins ===
For the 2025–26 Super Rygbi Cymru season, Williams played for Carmarthen Quins while a member of the Scarlets academy.

=== Scarlets ===
Williams was a member of the Scarlets academy, and captained the U18 side. In 2025 Williams joined the senior academy team. Williams made his senior debut in September 2025 during a preseason friendly against Dragons.

He was set to make his debut in October 2025 against Connacht during the 2025-26 United Rugby Championship but the match was postponed due to weather. He then suffered an ankle injury ruling him out of the subsequent fixtures. Williams was again named to make his debut on the final match of the season, but did not appear off the bench.

Williams eventually made his competitive debut on 26 September 2026, starting at number 8 against Cardiff. Typically a blindside flanker, a positional change was made due to injuries to Fletcher Anderson and Taine Plumtree.

== International career ==
=== Wales U19 and U20 ===
Williams played for Wales U19 in 2025 against Ireland, and scored a try. He featured again the following month against Italy.

Williams made his debut for Wales U20 on 6 February 2026, in the opening round of the 2026 Six Nations Under 20s Championship against England U20.
