= Nic Reynolds =

Welsh rugby union footballer

- Born: Nic Reynolds; 7 April 1989 (age 37) Llanelli, Wales
- Height: 186 cm (6 ft 1 in)
- Weight: 97 kg (15 st 4 lb)
- School: Coedcae School

Rugby union career
- Position: Centre
- Current team: Newcastle Falcons
Senior career
| Years | Team | Apps | (Points) |
| 2007–2014 | Llanelli RFC | 136 | (319) |
| 2014–2016 | London Welsh | 45 | (60) |
| 2016– | Newcastle Falcons | 0 | (0) |
- Correct as of 5 March 2016
Provincial / State sides
| Years | Team | Apps | (Points) |
| 2009–2014 | Scarlets | 54 | (25) |
- Correct as of 5 March 2016
International career
| Years | Team | Apps | (Points) |
| 2009 | Wales U20 | 6 | (15) |
- Correct as of 5 March 2016

Nic Reynolds (born 7 April 1989) is a Welsh rugby union footballer.

He is 1.86 metres (6 ft 1 in) tall and weighs 97 kilograms (15 st 4 lb). He currently plays at centre for London Welsh in the Aviva Premiership, having previously made over 100 appearances for Llanelli RFC and over 50 appearances for the Scarlets.

Reynolds started his career playing for Llanelli RFC in the Welsh Premiership. He made his first appearance as a substitute in a friendly against Bridgend Athletic in 2007, and then went on to make a further two appearances in the 2007–08 season. He became a regular in Llanelli's side in the 2008–09 season, making 26 appearances, scoring 10 tries. His impressive performances in the 2009–10 season earned him a call-up to the Scarlets squad, and he made his debut against Newport Gwent Dragons in March 2009. At the end of the 2013–14 season, Reynolds left the Scarlets and Llanelli to join London Welsh.
