= Sam Lousi =

Tonga international rugby union & league player

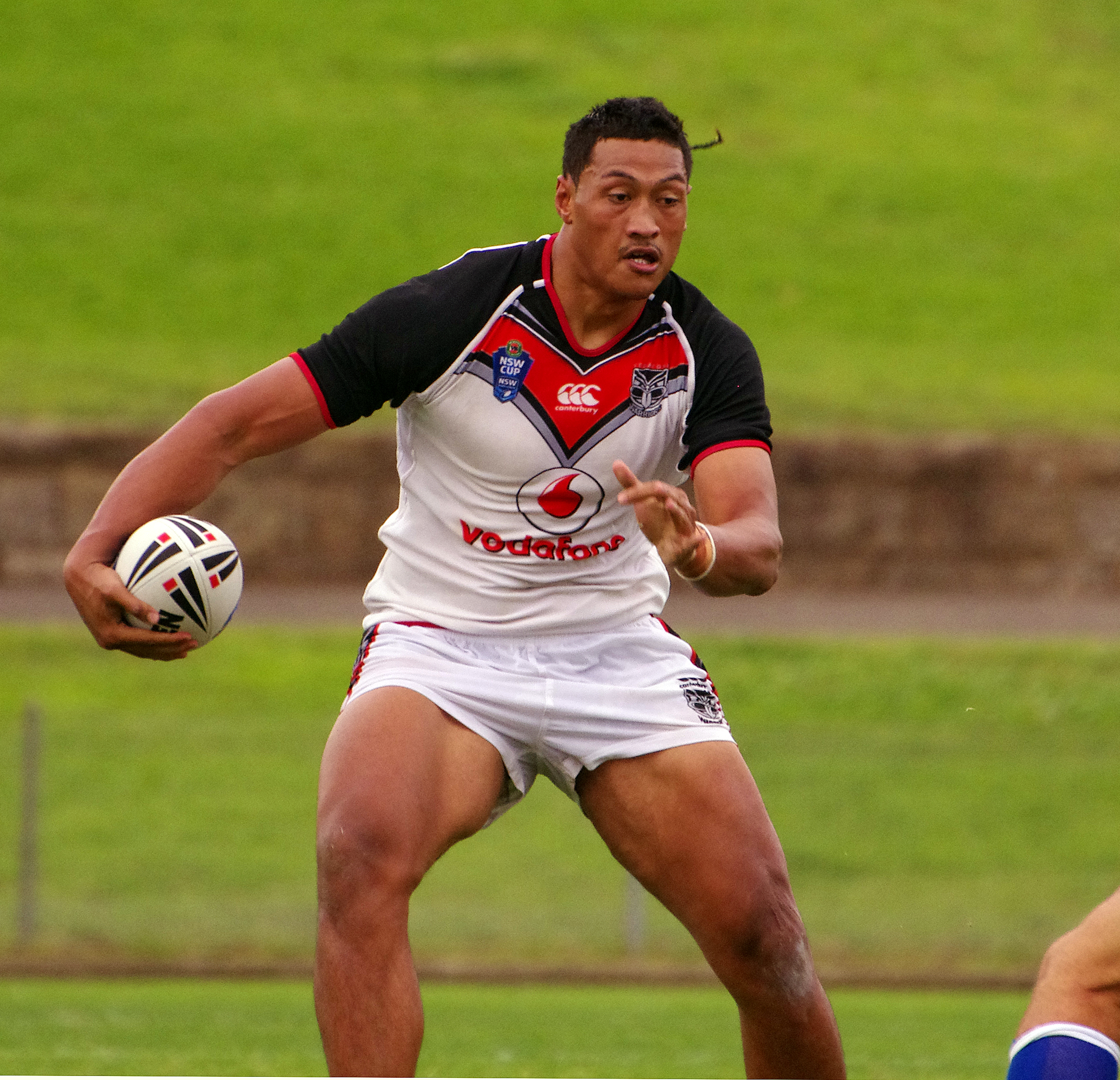

Personal information
- Full name: Samiuela Lousi
- Born: 20 July 1991 (age 35) Auckland, New Zealand
- Height: 1.99 m (6 ft 6 in)
- Weight: 121 kg (267 lb; 19 st 1 lb)

Playing information

Rugby league
- Position: Second-row, Prop
Club
Years	Team	Pld	T	G	FG	P
2012–14	New Zealand Warriors	3	0	0	0	0

Rugby union
- Position: Lock
Club
Years	Team	Pld	T	G	FG	P
2015–2016	Waratahs	18	0	0	0	0
2015	NSW Country Eagles	6	0	0	0	0
2016–2019	Wellington	22	3	0	0	15
2017–2019	Hurricanes	27	2	0	0	10
2019–	Scarlets	61	8	0	0	40
	Total	134	13	0	0	65
Representative
Years	Team	Pld	T	G	FG	P
2019–	Tonga	14	1	0	0	5
- Source: As of 28 August 2023
- Education: St Paul's College, Auckland
- Relatives: Sione Lousi (brother)

Samiuela Lousi (born 20 July 1991) is a professional dual-code rugby player who plays as a lock for United Rugby Championship club Scarlets. Born in New Zealand, he represents Tonga at international level after qualifying on ancestry grounds.

== Early life ==
Lousi was born in Auckland, New Zealand. He is the younger brother of Sione Lousi who played international rugby league for Tonga.

A Bay Roskill Vikings and Richmond Rovers junior, Lousi was educated at St Paul's College in Auckland. He played for the New Zealand Warriors Toyota Cup squad, being part of their grand final winning squads in 2010 and 2011. He finished his Toyota Cup career with 43 games and 11 tries.

Lousi represented the Junior Kiwis rugby league team in 2010 and 2011.

== Club career ==
=== Rugby league ===
Lousi signed with Warriors until the end of the 2013 season and was the tallest and heaviest player in the squad. He spent the 2012 season playing for the Auckland Vulcans in the NSW Cup before making his National Rugby League debut in round 20 as a last minute replacement for Steve Rapira, who suffered an injury in pre-match warm ups. Lousi had played a game for the Vulcans earlier in the day.

=== Rugby union ===
Lousi signed with the NSW Waratahs for the 2015 season but, after gaining four caps, he suffered a shoulder injury which ended his Super Rugby campaign. He joined the New South Wales Country Eagles team in the National Rugby Championship for the 2015 season. In 2016, he joined Sydney club Southern Districts. In 2019, he agreed to join Scarlets. In that same year he was selected to play for Tonga in the Rugby World Cup in Japan. Lousi was named the Scarlets' fans and players' player of the year in the 2021–22 season. He signed a contract extension with the Scarlets in April 2024.
