= Richard Kelly (rugby union) =

Welsh rugby player (born 1987)

- Born: Richard Kelly; 10 September 1987 (age 39) Swansea, Wales
- Height: 2.00 m (6 ft 7 in)
- Weight: 114 kg (17 st 13 lb)
- School: Olchfa Comprehensive School

Rugby union career
- Position: Lock
Amateur team(s)
| Years | Team | Apps | (Points) |
- Dunvant RFC
| – | Mumbles RFC | | |
Senior career
| Years | Team | Apps | (Points) |
| 2007–2012 | Swansea RFC | 94 | (50) |
| 2012-14 | Carmarthen Quins | 6 | (0) |
| 2013-14 | Llanelli RFC | 5 | (0) |
Provincial / State sides
| Years | Team | Apps | (Points) |
| 2009–2011 | Ospreys | 6 | (0) |
| 2012-14 | Scarlets | 35 | (0) |

Richard Kelly (born 10 September 1987) is a retired Welsh rugby union player who played as a lock for the Ospreys and the Scarlets in the Pro14. He was appointed as the Ospreys' transition coach in September 2022.

== Rugby career ==
Kelly was born in Swansea, and played for both Mumbles and Dunvant before signing for Swansea RFC in 2007. He made his debut for the Ospreys regional side in May 2009 playing the last 6 minutes of the Celtic League match against Munster, this would be his only league appearance for the Ospreys. Over the next three season Kelly continued to play for Swansea making a further 5 appearances for the Ospreys, all in the Anglo-Welsh Cup, before joining the Scarlets in the summer of 2012.

Kelly got a broken arm in a Champions Cup game against Leicester Tigers in October 2014. Unfortunately, he failed to recover properly from this injury, and he announced his retirement in September 2014. He has also spent time working as a forwards coach at Carmarthen Quins and have also been part of the academy coaching staff at the Scarlets for a couple of years.
