= Gareth Owen (rugby union) =

Welsh rugby player (born 1988)

- Born: Gareth Owen; 5 November 1988 (age 38) Bridgend, Wales
- Height: 183 cm (6 ft 0 in)
- Weight: 95 kg (14 st 13 lb)

Rugby union career
- Position: Centre/Wing/Fullback
- Current team: Newcastle Falcons
Senior career
Years	Team	Apps	(Points)
-2007	Maesteg		
2007–09	Bridgend	7	(17)
2009–11	Swansea	5	(64)
2012–	Llanelli	7	(5)
2014	Llandovery	2	(5)
2016	Carmarthen Quins	1	(0)
2017-2019	Leicester Tigers	29	(15)
2019-	Newcastle Falcons		
- Correct as of 19 May 2019
Provincial / State sides
Years	Team	Apps	(Points)
2007-12	Ospreys	50	(86)
2012-17	Scarlets	72	(32)
- Correct as of 27 February 2017
International career
Years	Team	Apps	(Points)
2006-07	Wales U19	7	(20)
2007-08	Wales U20	4	(5)
2007-?	Wales 7s		
- Correct as of 27 February 2017

Gareth Owen (born 5 November 1988 in Bridgend, Wales) is a Welsh rugby union player who plays at Centre, Fullback and Flyhalf. He currently plays for Newcastle Falcons in England's second division, the RFU Championship.

== Career ==
Owen started his domestic club rugby with Maesteg RFC where he played alongside several greats such as Alan Bateman, Kevin Ellis and Jonathan Davies. He spent the 2006 season with Celtic Crusaders in rugby league but didn't ever make the first team. In June 2007 he gained a development contract with the Ospreys region for the 2007–2008 season after impressing in the U19 IRB World Championships.

Owen earned a Wales U19 squad call up ahead of the spring internationals in February 2007, and made a replacement appearance in the victory over the Irish and scored an injury time try against France.

Owen subsequently earned himself a place in the Wales U19 squad for the 2007 IRB U19 World Championships in Belfast. He played in all five games of the tournament, making the starting XV on four occasions and coming on as a replacement in the victory over Samoa. Owen scored three tries over the course of the Championship, against Argentina and New Zealand in the Division A knockout stages and against Australia in the third place play-off.

In November 2007 Owen received a call-up to the Wales Sevens squad ahead of the initial legs of the 2007–2008 IRB Sevens World Series, though he sustained a knee injury in the first day of play at the Dubai Sevens against Samoa.

In May 2009 Owen was called up to the senior Wales Rugby team as one of 11 uncapped players for their summer tour of North America even though he had played most of the season for the semi-professional Bridgend Ravens in the Principality Premiership (suffering relegation), he was forced to withdraw from the squad due to an injury.

He played regularly for the Ospreys in the following two seasons, before suffering an ACT injury that ruled him out of the entire 2011/12 season, which eventually led to him being released by the Ospreys in July 2012 and he joined the Scarlets

On 30 June 2017, Owen left the Scarlets to join English Premiership Rugby club Leicester Tigers ahead of the 2017–18 season. He made his debut for Leicester at the Madejski Stadium in a 28–27 win over London Irish, Owen was sin binned in the 33rd minute for a dangerous tackle. On 15 May 2019 he was confirmed as leaving for Newcastle Falcons.
