= Dan Thomas (rugby union) =

Welsh rugby union footballer

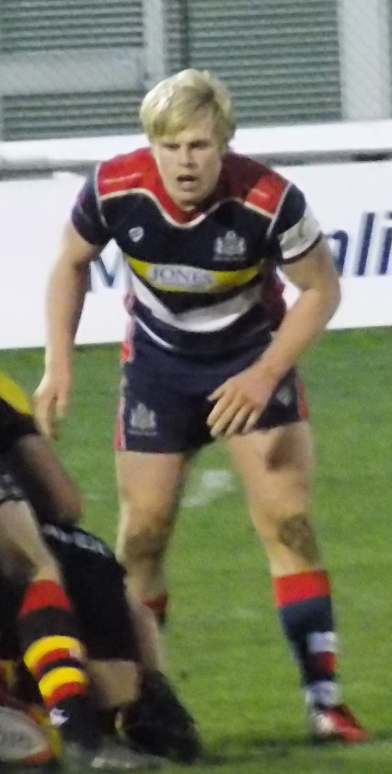
- Born: Daniel Thomas; 11 October 1993 (age 33) Carmarthen, Carmarthenshire, Wales
- Height: 183 cm (6 ft 0 in)
- Weight: 102 kg (225 lb; 16 st 1 lb)
- School: Ysgol Bro Myrddin

Rugby union career
- Position: Openside Flanker
- Current team: Cardiff
Senior career
Years	Team	Apps	(Points)
2011–2014	Llanelli RFC	76	(80)
2012–2014	Scarlets	8	(5)
2014–2017	Gloucester Rugby	11	(20)
2017–2024	Bristol Bears	124	(95)
2022	→ Scarlets (loan)	4	(0)
2024–	Cardiff	36	(25)
- Correct as of 17 July 2026
International career
Years	Team	Apps	(Points)
2012-2013	Wales U20	17	(10)

Dan Thomas (born 11 October 1993) is a Welsh rugby union player currently playing for Cardiff in the United Rugby Championship. He previously previously played for Llanelli RFC, Scarlets, Gloucester and Bristol Bears. His position is Flanker. He is a Wales Under-20 international.

In January 2013 he was selected in the Wales Under 20 squad for the 2013 Six Nations Under 20s Championship.

On 2 May 2017, Thomas left Gloucester to join local rivals Bristol in the RFU Championship ahead of the 2017–18 season. Bristol Head coach (at the time) Mark Tainton said that Thomas' form and physicality 'impressed', whilst at previous club, Gloucester.

On 1 March 2019 Thomas scored his first English Premiership try for Bristol, in a dramatic and close victory, against former team Gloucester.

Thomas rejoined the Scarlets on a short-term loan on 20 October 2022, as injury cover.

On 12 June 2024, Thomas would return home to Wales to join region Cardiff back in the United Rugby Championship for the 2024-25 season.

At the end of the 2025-26 season, Thomas was rewarded by winning the "Players’ Player of the Season" at the Cardiff Rugby End of Season Awards. Thomas also penned a new contract at the club to stay beyond the 2025-26 season.
