= Kristian Phillips =

Welsh rugby union player (born 1990)

- Born: Kristian Phillips; 2 September 1990 (age 36) Neath, Wales
- Height: 180 cm (5 ft 11 in)
- Weight: 91 kg (14 st 5 lb)
- School: Ysgol Gyfun Ystalyfera
- University: Neath College

Rugby union career
- Position: Winger
Senior career
Years	Team	Apps	(Points)
2011-12	Bridgend RFC	9	(50)
2012-14	Llanelli RFC	19	(57)
2014-15	Llandovery RFC	4	(15)
- Correct as of 31 December 2017
Provincial / State sides
Years	Team	Apps	(Points)
2007-12	Ospreys	20	(23)
2012-15	Scarlets	54	(35)
2015-16	Ospreys	2	(0)
2016-17	London Welsh	0	(0)
2017	Bath	0	(0)
- Correct as of 31 December 2017
International career
Years	Team	Apps	(Points)
- Wales U16
- Wales U18
2010	Wales U20	13	(25)
- Correct as of 31 December 2017

Kristian Phillips (born 2 September 1990) is a Welsh rugby union player who plays on the wing and has represented Wales at under-16, under-18 and under-20 levels.

== Life and career ==
Phillips was involved in a controversy when he was 13. After he starred in a game where his school Ysgol Gyfun Ystalyfera thrashed south London private school Dulwich College, Dulwich approached Phillips and offered him a scholarship, without telling his school. The authorities at Ysgol Gyfun Ystalyfera were angered by the offer, accusing Dulwich of trying to 'poach' Phillips.

Phillips made his debut for the Ospreys regional team in 2008, but spent most of his time with the region playing in the Principality Premiership, turning out for Neath, Tonmawr and Bridgend.

In November 2011, Phillips was fined by the Ospreys for sending a homophobic tweet targeting Big Brother contestant Aaron Allard.

In May 2012 Phillips joined the Scarlets. After making 30 appearances and getting 20 points he decided to leave his club and return home to Ospreys.

On 3 July 2015 Phillips rejoined his former club Ospreys.

Phillips joined RFU Championship side London Welsh for the 2016–17 season.

=== International ===
Phillips made his first Wales under-20 appearance in Wales' first game in the 2009 under-20 Six Nations, an 18 – 17 loss to Scotland under-20s, by scoring two tries.

On 22 December 2009 he was named in the Wales Under 20 Squad for the 2010 Under-20 Six Nations tournament.

On 18 January 2010 Phillips was one of two shock call ups to the Wales national rugby union team for the 2010 Six Nations squad. The other shock call up was his 17-year-old teammate Tom Prydie.
