= Wyn Jones (rugby union) =

British Lions & Wales international rugby union player

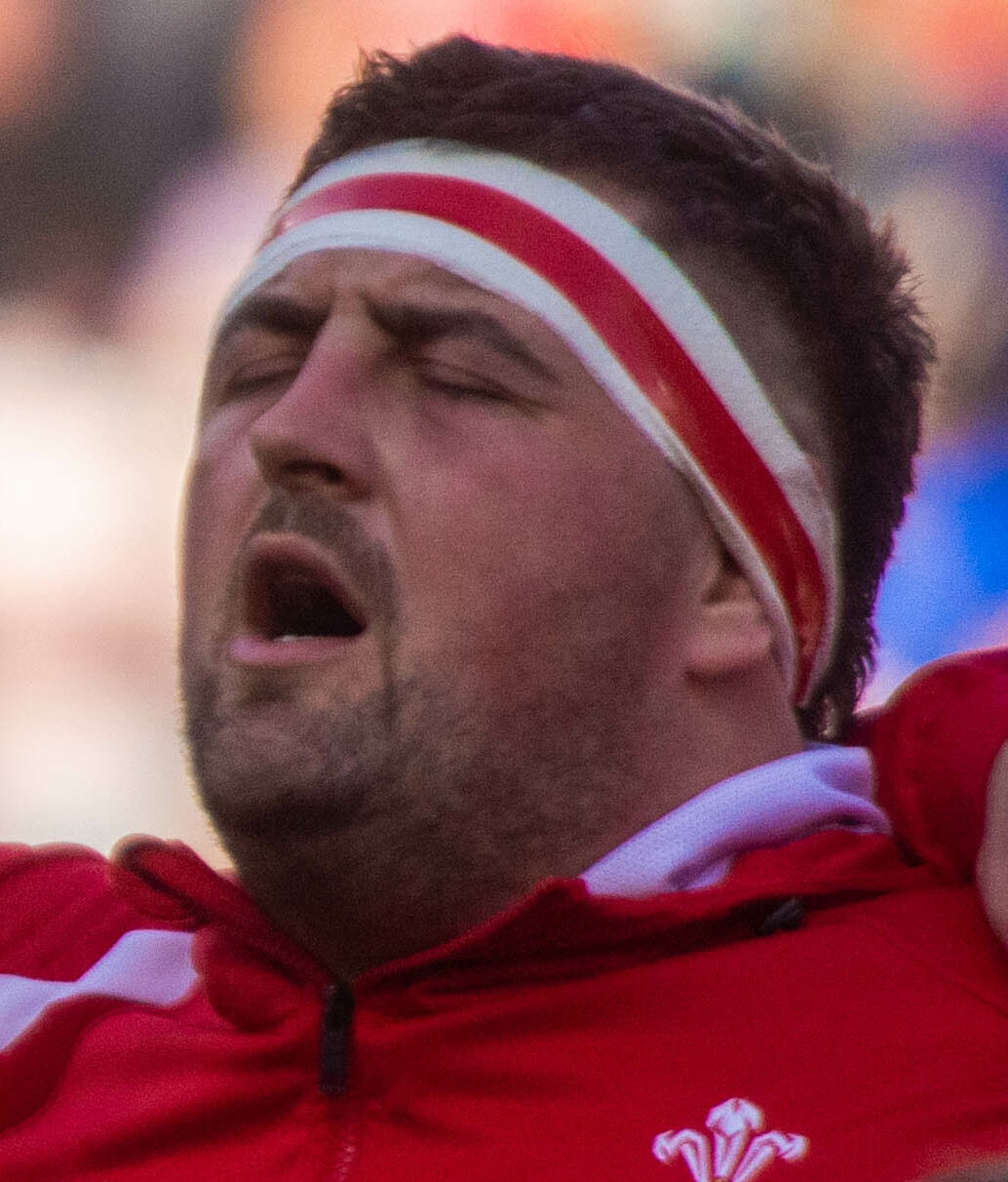
- Jones in 2023
- Born: Wyn Jones; 26 February 1992 (age 34) Llandovery, Wales
- Height: 184 cm (6 ft 0 in)
- Weight: 114 kg (17 st 13 lb; 251 lb)
- School: Ysgol Gyfun Pantycelyn
- University: Aberystwyth University

Rugby union career
- Position: Loosehead Prop
- Current team: Harlequins
Senior career
Years	Team	Apps	(Points)
2010–2013	Llandovery RFC	90	(51)
2013–2024	Scarlets	131	(10)
2024–2025	Harlequins	20	(5)
2025–	Dragons	16	(5)
- Correct as of 13 August 2026
International career
Years	Team	Apps	(Points)
2017–2023	Wales	48	(10)
2021	British & Irish Lions	1	(0)
- Correct as of 13 August 2026

Wyn Jones (born 26 February 1992) is a Welsh rugby union player who plays prop for United Rugby Championship club Dragons.

Jones made his debut for the Scarlets regional team in 2014 having previously played for Llandovery RFC over 70 times.

== Early life ==
Jones was born and raised in Llandovery and attended Aberystwyth University.

== Club career ==
Jones joined Scarlets on 1 July 2013 following three years at amateurs side Llandovery. He was part of the Pro12 winning Scarlets side in the 2016/17 season and the side that lost in the final the following year.

On 31 July 2024, Jones joined Premiership Rugby side Harlequins alongside international teammate Leigh Halfpenny. In February 2025, he scored his first try for the club during a Premiership Cup fixture against Saracens.

In May 2025, he signed for United Rugby Championship club Dragons ahead of the 2025–26 season.

== International ==
In May 2017, Jones was named in the Wales senior squad for the tests against Tonga and Samoa in June 2017. He won the Six Nations Grand Slam with Wales in 2019. He was selected by Warren Gatland as part of the Wales squad for the 2019 Rugby World Cup where started three out of four group games. He also started both the quarter final win against France and semi final loss to South Africa before dropping to the bench for the 3rd place playoff loss to New Zealand. In 2021, Jones was part of Wayne Pivac's Six Nations Championship winning side.

=== International tries ===
Try	Opponent	Location	Venue	Competition	Date	Result
1	England	London, England	Twickenham Stadium	2019 Rugby World Cup warm-up matches	11 August 2019	Loss
2	Scotland	Edinburgh, Scotland	Murrayfield	2021 Six Nations	13 February 2021	Win
