= Steff Evans =

Welsh rugby player (born 1994)

Steffan Evans
- Born: Steffan R Evans; 1 September 1994 (age 32) Llanelli, Wales
- Height: 1.78 m (5 ft 10 in)
- Weight: 82 kg (12 st 13 lb)
- School: Ysgol Gyfun Y Strade

Rugby union career
- Position(s): Wing; Fullback
- Current team: Scarlets
Amateur team(s)
Years	Team	Apps	(Points)
2012–2016	Llanelli	28	(76)
- Correct as of 19 January 2017
Senior career
Years	Team	Apps	(Points)
2014–2025	Scarlets	180	(356)
- Correct as of 13 August 2026
International career
Years	Team	Apps	(Points)
- Wales U18
2014	Wales U20	1	(0)
2017–2020	Wales	14	(30)
- Correct as of 13 August 2026
National sevens team
Years	Team		Comps
2016	Wales 7's		1

Steffan Evans (born 1 September 1994) is a Welsh rugby union player who plays for Scarlets regional team as a fullback and winger, although he has played at centre for Llanelli too. He studied in Ysgol Gyfun y Strade, he is a fluent Welsh speaker.

Evans made his debut for the Scarlets regional team in 2014 having previously played for the Scarlets academy.

Evans finished as the 2016-2017 Pro12 season's highest try scorer with 11 tries.

== International ==
Evans made his only appearance for the Wales U20s in a 10-16 defeat to France in 2014

After good form in the first half of the 2016-17 season, Evans earned a call-up to the Welsh squad for the 2017 Six Nations. In May 2017 he was named in the Wales senior squad for the tests against Tonga and Samoa in June 2017

During Wales' summer tour Evans scored two tries against Samoa.

=== International tries ===
Try	Opponent	Location	Venue	Competition	Date	Result
1	Samoa	Apia, Samoa	Apia Park	2017 Summer Internationals	23 June 2017	Win
2	Samoa	Apia, Samoa	Apia Park	2017 Summer Internationals	23 June 2017	Win
3	Australia	Cardiff, Wales	Millennium Stadium	2017 Autumn Internationals	11 November 2017	Loss
4	Scotland	Cardiff, Wales	Millennium Stadium	2018 Six Nations	3 February 2018	Win
5	Ireland	Dublin, Ireland	Lansdowne Road	2018 Six Nations	24 February 2018	Loss
6	Tonga	Cardiff, Wales	Millennium Stadium	2018 Autumn Internationals	17 November 2018	Win
