= Wayne Pivac =

New Zealand rugby union coach

- Full name: Wayne Jeffrey Pivac
- Born: 10 September 1962 (age 64) Auckland, New Zealand
- School: Westlake Boys High School

Rugby union career
- Position(s): Lock, Flanker, Number 8
Senior career
Years	Team	Apps	(Points)
1985–1987	North Harbour	24	(8)
- Correct as of 05 December 2022
Coaching career
- Years: Team
- 1997–1998: Northland
- 1999–2003: Auckland
- 2004–2007: Fiji
- 2007–2008: North Harbour
- 2012–2013: Auckland
- 2014–2019: Scarlets
- 2019–2022: Wales
- 2023–2025: NEC Green Rockets Tokatsu
- 2026-: Benetton
- Correct as of 25 August 2023

Wayne Pivac (born 1962) is a New Zealand rugby union coach who is the head coach of Benetton. In November 2019 he replaced Warren Gatland as the Wales national team coach and remained in this position until 2022.

A former sworn officer in the New Zealand Police, he was a constable at the Takapuna police station on Auckland's North Shore. He played his early rugby at Rosmini College and then Westlake Boys High School. Pivac played senior rugby for both the Northcote and Takapuna rugby clubs. Pivac played for North Harbour Rugby Union while he was a policeman. A recurring knee injury forced Pivac to retire from playing rugby at the age of 28. In 2012 Pivac was named at flanker in the Westlake Boys High school 50 year anniversary greatest First XV.

== New Zealand and Fiji ==
Pivac began coaching at Takapuna RFC, guiding them to the 1994 North Harbour club premiership before spending two seasons with North Harbour's second XV, then Northland, the province his father represented. Pivac coached Northland to National Provincial Championship Second Division success in 1997 and earned them promotion to the First Division the following year. Pivac then coached Auckland to win the NPC in 2002 and again in 2003, as well as the Ranfurly Shield. Pivac was voted New Zealand Rugby Union Coach of the Year in 2003.

Pivac was hired by the Fiji Rugby Union in February 2004 to replace coach Mac McCallion. Fiji won the Pacific Tri-Nations in Pivac's first year as head coach and Pivac also helped coach the Fijian Sevens to win the 2005 Rugby World Cup Sevens. In January 2007, Pivac quit Fiji Rugby as the head coach, citing family commitments.

Following his move back to New Zealand from Fiji, Pivac was appointed coach of North Harbour in the same month. After a disappointing season with North Harbour, Pivac stepped down as coach in 2008 and was replaced by Craig Dowd and Jeff Wilson, who were also replaced the next year after a further disappointing season. In 2011, Pivac succeeded Mark Anscombe as the Auckland coach in the ITM Cup.

== Wales ==
In 2014, Pivac was appointed the Assistant Coach of the Scarlets, who play out of the Parc y Scarlets stadium in Llanelli, Wales. Having initially been taken on to work with the forwards, Pivac was then promoted to the Scarlets' head coach following the departure of Simon Easterby to Ireland. Pivac then steered his side to a PRO12 title in Dublin, Ireland, defeating Munster in a 46-22 six-try victory at the Aviva Stadium to secure their first major trophy for 13 years in May, 2017.

On 9 July 2018, it was announced that Pivac would succeed Warren Gatland as the Wales coach. He would remain as Scarlets coach for the next year and employed on a four-year contract by the WRU from July 2019, with a transition planned for after the 2023 Rugby World Cup.

His first game in charge of Wales was a non-international match against the Barbarians, on 30 November 2019, in the Principality Stadium. Wales won the match 43–33.

In February 2020, in his first Six Nations match as head coach, Wales beat Italy 42–0 in Cardiff. Wales finished the 2020 Six Nations Championship in 5th place.

On 13 February 2021, Pivac won his first silverware for Wales, beating Scotland 25–24 in Round 2 of the 2021 Six Nations Championship, where Wales won the Doddie Weir Cup. The following round Wales got their highest ever points total vs England, beating them 40-24 and winning the Triple Crown. On March 26, Wales were crowned champions of the Six Nations after winning 4 out of their 5 matches.

After the false dawn, Pivac saw his worst run yet in the 2022 Six Nations, finishing 5th. The most notable moment during the campaign was when his side were defeated by Italy at the Millennium Stadium; Italy's first win in the 6 Nations since 2015 and their first ever win in Cardiff. After further home defeats in the autumn internationals to Georgia and Australia, Pivac was let go by the WRU in December 2022 and replaced by his predecessor Warren Gatland.
