= Scarlets =

Rugby union team based in Llanelli, Wales

- Union: Welsh Rugby Union
- Nickname: The Turks
- Founded: 2003; 23 years ago
- Location: Llanelli, Wales
- Ground: Parc y Scarlets (Capacity: 14,870)
- Chairman: Simon Muderack
- President: Derek Quinnell
- Director of Rugby: Nigel Davies
- Coach: Dwayne Peel
- Captain: Josh Macleod
- Most appearances: Vernon Cooper (369)
- Top scorer: Stephen Jones (2,850)
- Most tries: Wayne Proctor (173)
- League: United Rugby Championship
- 2025–26: 14th 4th, Welsh Shield
| 1st kit | 2nd kit |

Official website
- www.scarlets.wales
- Current season

The Scarlets (Welsh: Y Scarlets) are one of the four professional Welsh rugby union teams and are based in Llanelli, Wales. Their home ground is the Parc y Scarlets stadium. They play in the United Rugby Championship and in European Professional Club Rugby competitions. The club was originally named the Llanelli Scarlets but was renamed at the start of the 2008–09 rugby season.

The Llanelli Scarlets were founded in 2003, as one of the five (now four) regional teams created by the Welsh Rugby Union (WRU). The Scarlets are affiliated with a number of semi-professional and amateur clubs throughout the area, including Welsh Premier Division sides Llanelli RFC, Carmarthen Quins RFC and Llandovery RFC. Through the 2007–08 season, they played most of their games at Stradey Park in Llanelli, but they have also played matches at the Racecourse Ground in Wrexham. The club's new stadium, Parc y Scarlets (English: Scarlets Park), was constructed in nearby Pemberton, and opened in November 2008.

The Scarlets won the league twice: the initial 2003–04 Celtic League season, and the Pro12 in 2016–17, defeating Munster 46–22 in the 2017 Pro12 Grand Final.

== History ==
=== Rebranding ===
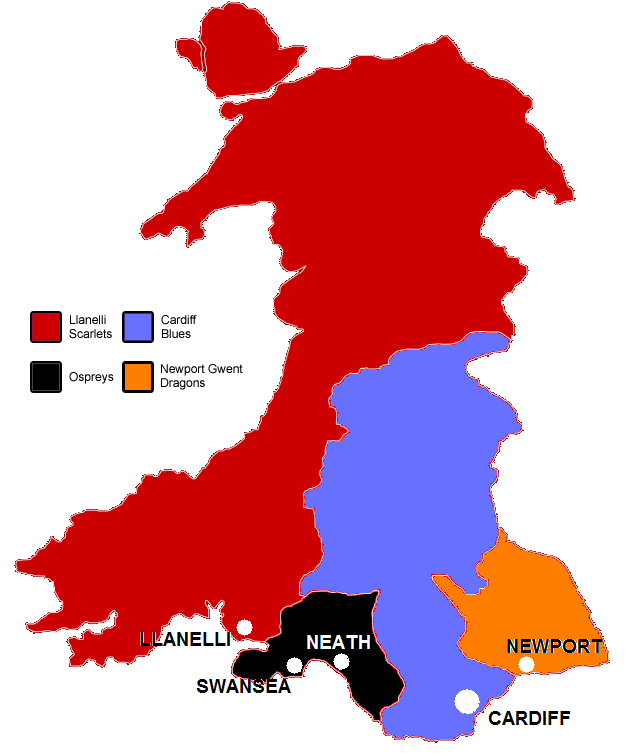
A diagram showing the development pathways managed by Wales' professional clubs

In 2003, the WRU elected to reduce the top tier of Welsh professional rugby from nine clubs into five regions during the introduction of regional rugby union teams in Wales, attempting to mirror the successful formats in Ireland, South Africa, Australia and New Zealand.

Initially, it was planned to have a region playing at Stradey Park, with players coming from Llanelli, Swansea and Neath. This was then modified to have Llanelli and Swansea merging, while Neath joined with Bridgend. Llanelli were opposed to both plans and requested standalone status. Eventually, Llanelli and Cardiff were allowed to remain independent. The Llanelli Scarlets brand was officially launched on 7 July 2003.

Despite always having been a 100% owned Llanelli RFC subsidiary, the Scarlets were originally conceived as representing the whole of West and North Wales. In the early seasons of regional rugby, the Scarlets played a small number of games at the Racecourse Ground in Wrexham. While nominally continuing to be the regional franchisee for North Wales, the Scarlets presence there has diminished. As of 2018, the Scarlets consider their region to represent the three counties of Carmarthenshire, Ceredigion and Pembrokeshire.

=== 2003–2014 ===
==== 2003–04 season ====
Largely drawn from the Llanelli RFC side that won the Welsh Cup the preceding year, the Scarlets carried that success forward into their inaugural season. They reached the last eight of the 2003–04 Heineken Cup and finished the Celtic League season as champions by four points over Ulster. In the Heineken Cup, the Scarlets were drawn in Pool 4 along with Northampton Saints, Agen and Borders. The Scarlets won five of their six matches, losing only to Agen, and finished top of their pool before losing to French club Biarritz 27–10 in the quarter-finals.

==== 2004–05 season ====
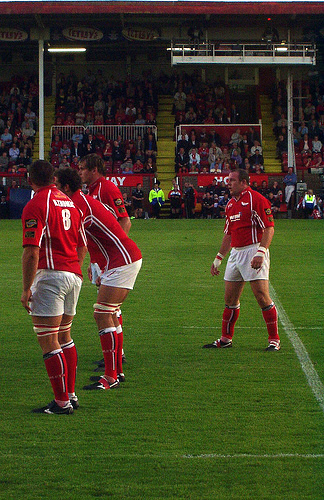
Scarlets players during a league match against Glasgow Warriors in 2006

The following season, however, was less successful. Plagued by injuries and retirements, as well as the departure of influential fly-half Stephen Jones to Clermont, the Scarlets finished a disappointing fifth in the league. They were even less successful in the Heineken Cup, winning just two of their six pool games to finish third behind Northampton and Toulouse. The salvation of their season came in reaching the final of the Celtic Cup, which they lost 26–17 to Munster.

==== 2005–06 season ====
The Scarlets again failed to qualify from their Heineken Cup group in 2005–06 and finished sixth in the Celtic League. They did, however, find more success in the newly restructured Anglo-Welsh Cup. After finishing at the top of their pool, they defeated Bath by one point in the semi-finals to reach the final against London Wasps at Twickenham; missing several international players, they lost 26–10. In the Heineken Cup, it was a similar story to the previous season, with the Scarlets winning two of their six fixtures to finish third in the pool again, behind Toulouse and Wasps. Despite finishing sixth in the Celtic League, the team qualified for the Heineken Cup for the 2006–07 season as the second-best-placed Welsh team in the league. They also re-signed Stephen Jones, and full-back Barry Davies extended his contract to stay with the Scarlets. The Scarlets' Director of Rugby, Gareth Jenkins, had been appointed as Wales' national team coach, having been with the region since its inception. Phil Davies, then coach of Leeds Tykes, replaced Jenkins at the Scarlets.

==== 2006–07 season ====
At the first home game of the 2006–07 season, an information sheet was handed out to supporters with details of the club's financial situation. There was opposition by local residents to plans by the Scarlets to move to a new stadium and sell their current ground for housing development. The information sheet stated that, due to delays caused by the opposition and benefactors pulling out of the club, it was "extremely unlikely that [the Llanelli Scarlets] could survive to the end of the present season unless other financial assistance is found", which would result in "the loss, probably for all time, of professional rugby in West Wales." Local residents believed, however, that the infrastructure, such as roads and schools, will not cope with 450 new houses being built on the site. On 28 November 2006, the regions secured investment from Tim Griffiths, a London-based businessman.

In the 2006–07 Heineken Cup, the Scarlets recorded one of the most famous victories in their brief history as a region, defeating Toulouse 41–34 away, despite twice trailing by 21 points. This was an unexpected victory, despite the Scarlets having won their first three games of the 2006–07 competition. They later secured their place in the Heineken Cup quarter-final with a convincing 35–11 win over Ulster at Ravenhill. The Scarlets went on to become only the fifth team in the history of the competition to win all their pool matches. They beat current holders Munster 24–15 at Stradey Park in the quarter-finals, but were beaten 33–17 in the semis by a strong Leicester Tigers side, putting an end to their hopes of making it 'third time lucky' in Heineken Cup semi-finals.

==== 2007–08 season ====
On 30 April 2008, Phil Davies was replaced by Nigel Davies after a sixth-place finish in the Celtic League and an end of season slump.

==== 2008–09 season ====
The Scarlets moved from Stradey Park at the end of November 2008 to a new ground at Pemberton called Parc y Scarlets. The final Scarlets match played at Stradey Park was on 24 October 2008, against Bristol in the group stage of the Anglo-Welsh Cup. The Scarlets won 27–0 in front of a capacity crowd, which included former Llanelli captains such as Delme Thomas and Phil Bennett.

The Scarlets' first match at their new home was an 18–16 Celtic League defeat to Munster on 28 November 2008. Their first Heineken Cup match at Parc y Scarlets was held on 12 December against Ulster and finished in a 16–16 draw. Both matches were held with reduced capacity, as law requires that a new stadium hold three events at reduced capacity before it is authorised for its full capacity. The official opening ceremony was on 31 January 2009, when the Scarlets faced the Barbarians.

==== 2011–12 season ====
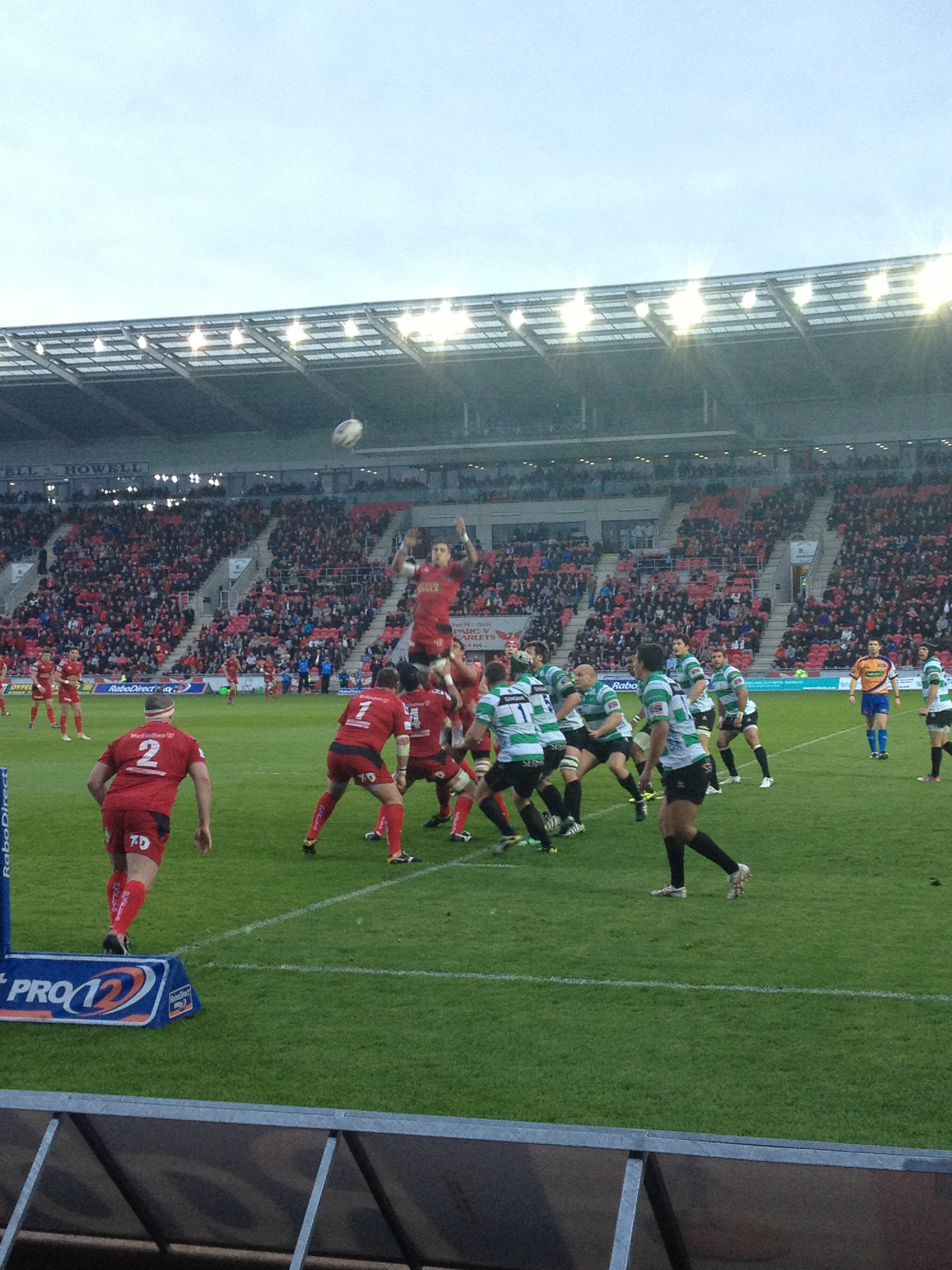
Scarlets players contest a line-out in a match against Benetton Treviso in 2013

During the 2011–12 season, the Scarlets were unable to progress to the knockout rounds of the Heineken Cup, but placing second in their pool earned them an automatic drop-down spot in the quarter-finals of the Challenge Cup. They lost the resulting fixture against Brive 15–12, despite scoring the only try of the match through Liam Williams.

Nigel Davies departed the club at the conclusion of the 2011–12 season, and was replaced by defence coach and longtime Scarlets player, Simon Easterby.

=== 2014–2019: Wayne Pivac years ===
==== 2014–15 season ====
In May 2014, it was confirmed that the four Welsh regions would compete in the annual Premiership Sevens Series after a three-year deal was agreed with BT Sport.

After the 2013–14 season, the Scarlets had numerous changes in coaching staff. Forwards coach Danny Wilson departed for Bristol, while Byron Hayward joined as a defense coach. Wayne Pivac was hired as an assistant coach, but selected as head coach when Simon Easterby left the position to become forwards coach with Ireland.

Under Pivac, the Scarlets' performances did not immediately turn around. Centre Jonathan Davies left for Clermont ahead of the 2014–15 season, but Hadleigh Parkes was signed from Auckland, and reunited with former coach Pivac. Mid-table finishes continued for the next two seasons. Mark Jones departed in 2015, replaced by long time Scarlets fly-half and London Wasps attack coach Stephen Jones.

==== 2016–17 season ====
Ahead of 2016, Tadhg Beirne joined the side. The Irish forward arrived from Leinster, and capable of playing at lock and in the back row, proved to be an influential player in the pack. Recruitment was further bolstered with Crusaders back Johnny McNicholl and the return of Jonathan Davies from France. Fly-half Rhys Patchell was signed from Cardiff Blues, with Steven Shingler moving in the opposite direction. The season started poorly, with the Scarlets losing their first three matches. Improvements throughout the season saw the Scarlets finish in third place in the table, qualifying for the play-offs. The Scarlets beat Leinster away at the RDS Stadium, 27–15, despite winger Steff Evans being sent off in the first half. The Scarlets beat Munster in the final with an emphatic 46–22 win. This was the Scarlets second title, their first having come in 2004 during the first Celtic League season.

==== 2017–18 season ====
The Scarlets looked to maintain their title the following season in the inaugural Pro14 tournament. Leigh Halfpenny joined from Toulon, replacing outgoing fullback Liam Williams. They topped their pool in the Champions Cup, and defeated La Rochelle 29–17 in the quarter-final. The Scarlets fell short of the final, losing to eventual winners Leinster in their semi-final.

They again reached the final in the league, having defeated the Cheetahs and Glasgow Warriors in the knock-out rounds, but came up short against Leinster, losing 40–32 in the final despite a late flurry of tries and a hat-trick from Johnny McNicholl.

==== 2018–19 season ====
Wayne Pivac was announced as Warren Gatland's successor as Wales coach after the 2019 Rugby World Cup. With him left Stephen Jones and Byron Hayward, who joined Pivac on the Wales coaching staff.

Crusaders assistant coach Brad Mooar was announced as the next head coach in December 2018.

==== Project Reset ====
In 2018, the Welsh Rugby Union sought to reform club rugby in Wales. Salaries had increased as they worked to entice Welsh players abroad to return, and they aimed to streamline costs with a banding system. The Professional Rugby Board (PRB) was created between the WRU and clubs to attempt to identify a sustainable path forward. The PRB evaluated numerous options including mergers and relocations of clubs, and by early 2019 felt the preferable option was to merge the Scarlets with west Wales rivals the Ospreys; the Swansea club having made a made an approach to the Scarlets in late 2018. This was not the first time a west Wales super club had been mooted; during the 2003 formation of regional rugby, a combination of the Llanelli, Swansea, and Neath forming a unified club was initially proposed. The new combined club would play league matches at Parc y Scarlets, with European fixtures at the Ospreys' Liberty Stadium. Shortly after the proposal was revealed, Scarlets ownership indicated the merger was "off the table", with Ospreys chairman Mike James resigning, and the club formation ultimately remaining unchanged.

=== 2019–2021: Coaching changes ===
==== 2019–20 season ====
New coach Brad Mooar started the 2019 season well, winning five out of the first six matches, but left before settling in, having been selected by new All Blacks coach Ian Foster to join his staff as assistant coach. The Scarlets and the New Zealand Rugby Union agreed to a release for Mooar, and his assistant coach Glenn Delaney was named as his successor.

==== 2020–21 season ====
Former Scarlets Dwayne Peel was announced as head coach for the forthcoming season, with Delaney moving to a Director of Rugby role. Peel was at the time contracted to join Cardiff Blues for the following season, as an assistant coach responsible for attack. Following the dismissal of Blues head coach John Mulvihill, former coach Dai Young made a return to the club initially as interim head coach and finally Director of Rugby. Due to this new coaching structure, the Scarlets and Blues came to an agreement allowing for Peel to no longer join Cardiff as an assistant coach, and instead join the Scarlets as head coach.

After a poor run of matches, Delaney was relieved of his duties as head coach and departed the club before assuming the Director of Rugby role, with Dai Flanagan stepping in as caretaker head coach.

=== 2021–present: Dwayne Peel era ===
==== 2021–22 season ====
Ahead of the 2021–22 United Rugby Championship, Leinster skills coach Hugh Hogan was brought in as defence coach. The Scarlets finished in 10th place, and narrowly missed out on winning the newly created URC Welsh Shield. Hogan departed after one season, being replaced by Wales assistant coach Gareth Williams.

==== 2022–23 season ====
Few signings were made prior to the 2022–23 United Rugby Championship season, with All Blacks utility forward Vaea Fifita the headline acquisition, while Liam Williams departed for Cardiff following his second spell with the club. Longtime prop Rob Evans followed Steffan Hughes, and former Dragon Angus O'Brien to the Dragons, along with backs coach Dai Flanagan, who was named as their new head coach.

Following their collapse in October 2022, Wasps head coach Lee Blackett joined as backs coach for the remainder of the season. The season began poorly for the Scarlets, winning only one URC match prior to the international window. Wales prop Sam Wainwright joined midseason, with Samson Lee remaining sidelined with a long-term injury. Upon regrouping the team won both matches in the first two rounds of the 2022–23 EPCR Challenge Cup, putting themselves at the top of their pool. They then beat Bayonne and the Cheetahs in the return matches to finish top of the pool and set up a round of 16 knockout fixture at home against Brive. The Scarlets followed up on their European victory the following week, beating the Bulls despite missing numerous players to Wales call-ups, and earning their first victory over the Pretoria-based team.

During the Six Nations, they secured a bonus-point win against Edinburgh, and two bonus points in a loss away to Munster, coming back from being 35–7 down at half-time. They then secured their second win over South African opposition of the season with a 32–20 win over a Sharks team heavily laden with Springboks. After beating Brive 19–7, they made their way into the quarter-finals of the Challenge Cup for the first time since 2019–20, facing ASM Clermont Auvergne at home. The Scarlets won the match 32–30, with a late try by Ryan Conbeer and a match-winning conversion from Sam Costelow three minutes from full-time, propelling them into a home semi-final. The Scarlets lost the resultant semi-final, their final match of the season.

The squad saw fifteen players leave the club, owing to the reduced salary caps imposed by the WRU. Notable departures included Rhys Patchell, Leigh Halfpenny, and Aaron Shingler, who spent his entire professional career with the club. Corey Baldwin and Dane Blacker were both released, and subsequently signed for the Dragons. In the backroom, Nigel Ashley-Jones departed the club after two seasons to join Eddie Jones with Australia. Lee Blackett left following his short-term agreement with the club, joining Bath Rugby. Forwards coach Ben Franks returned to New Zealand.

==== 2023–24 season ====
Joining the club were Welsh international Ioan Lloyd from Bristol Bears, while Tomi Lewis returned from Jersey Reds. Numerous renewals were also confirmed, such as lock pair Morgan Jones and Jac Price, centres Ioan Nicholas, Joe Roberts, and Eddie James, and prop Kemsley Mathias– all players developed from the Scarlets academy. Sam Wainwright signed a full contract, following on from his short-term deal. Hooker Ryan Elias signed an extension, despite interest from abroad. Also signed was Welsh-qualified former New Zealand U20 back row Taine Plumtree, who was quickly called up to the Welsh squad for World Cup preparations. Added to the restructured Scarlets academy were lock Ed Scragg, and Loughborough duo Charlie Titcombe and Teddy Leatherbarrow.

Clermont coach Jared Payne signed as the new attack coach, with Lions coach Albert van den Berg joining as the forwards coach. Shane Carney took over as Head of Athletic Performance, reuniting with Peel, having worked at Ulster together previously.

Few wins were seen during the season, the highlights being a home and away win against local rivals Cardiff, and earning a first win outside of Wales with a victory over Zebre Parma. In the Challenge Cup, they lost every match, and failed to earn a single point on the table. They finished the season with a win, in the annual Judgement Day fixture against the Dragons.

During the season, defence coach Gareth Williams was removed from his position, with Jared Payne replacing him, and Peel becoming responsible for the attack. Samson Lee announced his retirement mid-season, having failed to fully recover from a long-standing injury. Johnny McNicholl was released early to return home to New Zealand, joining the Crusaders as cover for former Scarlet Leigh Halfpenny. Notably, former Scarlets and Wales captain Ken Owens retired prior to the end of the season, having spent his entire professional career with the club.

Also departing the club were two more capped British Lions: Jonathan Davies and Wyn Jones; Welsh international Scott Williams; and academy products Dan Jones and Ryan Conbeer.

==== 2024–25 season ====
The Scarlets welcomed a raft of front row signings, including Scottish international Alec Hepburn, South African hooker Marnus van der Merwe, and Welsh cap Henry Thomas. Also joining were two Welsh qualified backs: Ellis Mee and Blair Murray. Former Wales assistant coach Leigh Jones joined the back room staff as Performance Director.

They once again suffered early season struggles, with their first win coming in round four against Cardiff at the Arms Park. The following week, they added another victory with their second win over the Bulls. Wins came sporadically throughout the season, but the Scarlets claimed their first win over Leinster in nearly seven years with a 35–22 victory.

The Scarlets reached the knock out rounds in both the URC and European Challenge Cup, making the URC quarter finals for the first time since 2018.

The end of season was overshadowed with the instability around Welsh regional rugby, and the signing of the updated Professional Rugby Agreement. While all four clubs were poised to sign, the WRU was forced to take over Cardiff Rugby when the club went into administration. This prompted the Scarlets and Ospreys to seek clarity over funding under the new agreement, and when details were not received by the deadline, the WRU chose to withdraw the offer to sign the PRA, and later announcing a desire to cut one of the professional clubs.

==== 2025–26 season ====
In support of the club amidst the backdrop of the potential loss of the club due to WRU initiatives, hundreds of fans began the season with a Save Our Scarlets march, ahead of the season opener.

Signings were made sporadically, with former players Jake Ball and Dane Blacker returning, amongst other signings. Owing to significant injuries in the second row, Harvey Cuckson and Alex Groves joined the club on loan. During the season they secured a notable signing in Crusaders back row Fletcher Anderson.

Little success was seen on field, with the club losing all Champions Cup fixtures. As a result of the performances, performance director Leigh Davies departed the club, and former head coach Nigel Davies returned as interim Director of Rugby. It was later announced that defence coach Jared Payne would leave at the end of the season. The Scarlets were boosted off field with a financial investment described as “significant”. At the end of the season, Davies was confirmed as the permanent Director of Rugby, signing a two year contract.

On 13 July 2026, the club signed the PRA, the last of the four clubs to do so, securing a playing future until at least 2028.

=== Name and colours ===
Scarlets logos

2003–2008

2008–

The Scarlets took their name from the nickname of Llanelli RFC, their main feeder club. Llanelli have played in red since 1884 when they played a game against a touring Ireland side. This close link with Llanelli RFC has also led to the Scarlets adopting the scarlet red colour for their primary jerseys, with their secondary colours generally being blue.

The region was originally named the Llanelli Scarlets, but was renamed at the start of the 2008–09 rugby season to more accurately represent the area covered by the region.

=== Kit suppliers ===
| Period | Kit providers |
|---|---|
| 2003–2009 | Kooga |
| 2009–2010 | Rhino |
| 2010–2014 | Burrda |
| 2014–2017 | Kooga |
| 2017–2022 | Macron |
| 2022–2025 | Castore |
| 2025–present | VX3 |

== Stadium ==
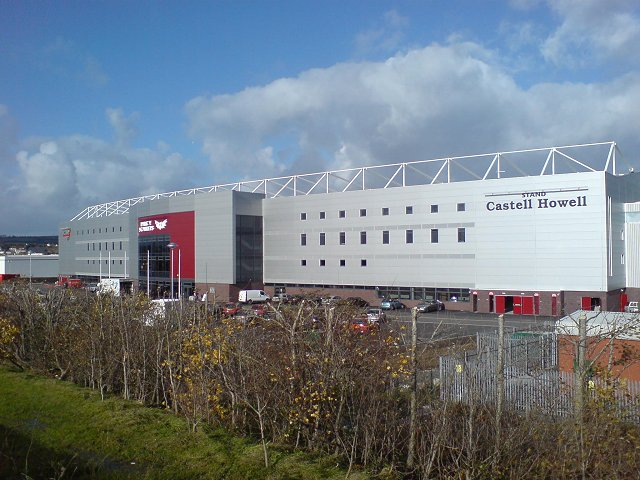
Scarlets current home ground, Parc y Scarlets

From 2003 to the 2007–08 season, the Scarlets played most of their home matches at Llanelli's Stradey Park (also the home of Llanelli RFC). However, they have played several games in North Wales, at Wrexham's Racecourse Ground, to promote the region's geographical representation. The last league game played at the Racecourse Ground was in September 2005. The 2006–07 season was planned to be the last season played at Stradey Park, which was subsequently to be demolished for the building of apartments. The Scarlets played every home game of the 2006–07 season at Stradey Park to commemorate the historic ground. They played their last game at Stradey Park on 24 October 2008 against Bristol, and their first game at Parc y Scarlets on 28 November 2008 against Munster.

The new home of the Scarlets and Llanelli RFC, known as Parc y Scarlets (English: Scarlets Park), is in Pemberton. The new stadium cost £23 million to be constructed and holds 14,340 spectators. The first game held at the stadium saw Llanelli RFC play Cardiff RFC on 15 November 2008. The stadium's main stand is located on the south side of the ground, and houses the new Scarlets museum and club shop, as well as a sports bar, the players' changing rooms and a players' gym. Stadium blueprints planned for the main stand to be about 20 metres (66 ft) tall. Outside the stadium there is a training barn for the players, as well as a training pitch and athletics track. The remainder of the site is taken up by the Parc Trostre retail park.

== Current squad ==
2026–27 Scarlets squad
| **Props**: (Wales) **Corey Domachowski**; (England) Gabe Hawley *; (Australia) Archer Holz; (Wales) **Kemsley Mathias**; (Wales) Josh Morse; (Wales) **Harri O'Connor**; (Wales) Sam O'Connor; (Wales) **Henry Thomas**; **Hookers**: (Wales) **Ryan Elias**; (Ireland) John McKee; (Wales) George Roberts; (Wales) Isaac Young; **Locks**: (New Zealand) Tom Allen; (England) Harvey Cuckson *; (Wales) Will Evans; (South Africa) Alex Groves; (Tonga) **Sam Lousi**; (Wales) Jac Price | **Back row**: (New Zealand) Fletcher Anderson; (Wales) Tristan Davies; (Wales) Dan Davis; (New Zealand) **Cullen Grace**; (Wales) **Josh Macleod** **(c)**; (Wales) **Taine Plumtree**; **Scrum-halves**: (Wales) Dane Blacker; (Wales) **Gareth Davies**; (Wales) Archie Hughes; **Fly-halves**: (Wales) **Gareth Anscombe**; (Wales) **Sam Costelow**; (Wales) Carwyn Leggatt-Jones | **Centres**: (Wales) **Joe Hawkins**; (Wales) **Eddie James**; (Wales) Macs Page; (Wales) **Joe Roberts**; (Wales) **Johnny Williams**; **Wings**: (Wales) Tomi Lewis; (Wales) **Ellis Mee**; **Fullbacks**: (Wales) Jac Davies; (England) Ioan Jones *; (Wales) **Blair Murray**; (New Zealand) Isaac Murray-MacGregor *; (Wales) Ioan Nicholas |
**(c)** denotes the team captain. **Bold** denotes internationally capped players. * denotes players qualified to play for Wales on residency or dual nationality.^{ST} denotes a short-term signing. Source:

=== Senior Academy squad ===
2026–27 Scarlets Academy squad
| **Props**: (Wales) Yestyn Cook; (Wales) Hudson Nevin; (Wales) Jac Pritchard; **Hookers**: (Wales) Harry Thomas; **Locks**: (Wales) Dylan Alford; (Kenya) Gabe Cahsay; (Wales) Kai Jones; (Wales) Sam Williams | **Back row**: (Wales) Joe Denman; (Wales) Keanu Evans; (Wales) Dom Kossuth; (Wales) Tiaan Sparrow; (Wales) Osian Williams; **Scrum-halves**: (Wales) Alfie Luger; (Wales) George MacDonald; **Fly-halves**: (Wales) Elis Price | **Centres**: (Samoa) Jayden Brown; (Wales) Gabe McDonald; (Wales) Gryff Watkins; **Wings**: (Wales) Thomas Williams; (Wales) Callum Woolley; **Fullbacks**: (Wales) Iori Badham; (Wales) Sion Jones |
**(c)** denotes the team captain. **Bold** denotes internationally capped players. * denotes players qualified to play for Wales on residency or dual nationality. Taking into account signings and departures ahead of 2026-27 season as listed on List of 2026-27 United Rugby Championship transfers. Source:

== Notable players ==
=== Club captains ===
| Captain | Season(s) | Honours |
|---|---|---|
| Leigh Davies | 2003–04 | Celtic League: 1 (2004) |
| Simon Easterby | 2004–05 – 2008–09 | — |
| Mark Jones | 2009–10 | — |
| Matthew Rees | 2010–11 – 2011–12 | — |
| Rob McCusker | 2012–13 | — |
| Rob McCusker; Jonathan Davies | 2013–14 | — |
| Ken Owens | 2014–15 – 2020–21 | Pro12: 1 (2017) |
| Jonathan Davies | 2021–22 – 2022–23 | — |
| Josh Macleod | 2023–24 – present | — |

=== Rugby World Cup ===
The following players have represented their countries at the Rugby World Cup, while playing for the Scarlets:

| Tournament | Players selected | Wales players | Other national team players |
|---|---|---|---|
| 2003 | 10 | Garan Evans, Dafydd Jones, Mark Jones, Stephen Jones, Robin McBryde, Dwayne Peel, Mark Taylor, Iestyn Thomas, Chris Wyatt | Canada: Jon Thiel |
| 2007 | 9 | Dafydd James, Mark Jones, Stephen Jones, Dwayne Peel, Alix Popham, Matthew Rees | Ireland: Simon Easterby; Samoa: Mahonri Schwalger; Scotland: Scott MacLeod |
| 2011 | 11 | Jonathan Davies, Stephen Jones, Tavis Knoyle, George North, Ken Owens, Rhys Priestland, Scott Williams | Fiji: Deacon Manu; Scotland: Sean Lamont; Tonga: Sione Timani, Viliame Iongi |
| 2015 | 7 | Jake Ball, Gareth Davies, Samson Lee, Ken Owens, Scott Williams, Liam Williams | Canada: D. T. H. van der Merwe |
| 2019 | 13 | Jake Ball, Gareth Davies, James Davies, Jonathan Davies, Ryan Elias, Leigh Halfpenny, Wyn Jones, Ken Owens, Hadleigh Parkes, Rhys Patchell, Aaron Shingler | Samoa: Kieron Fonotia; Scotland: Blade Thomson |
| 2023 | 7 | Sam Costelow, Gareth Davies, Ryan Elias, Kieran Hardy, Johnny Williams | Tonga: Vaea Fifita, Sam Lousi |

=== British & Irish Lions ===
The following players were selected for the British & Irish Lions touring squads while contracted to the Scarlets:

| Year | Tour | Series result | Players |
|---|---|---|---|
| 2005 | New Zealand | 0–3 | Simon Easterby, Dwayne Peel |
| 2009 | South Africa | 1–2 | Stephen Jones, Matthew Rees |
| 2013 | Australia | 2–1 | Jonathan Davies, George North |
| 2017 | New Zealand | 1–1 | Jonathan Davies, Ken Owens, Liam Williams |
| 2021 | South Africa | 1–2 | Gareth Davies, Wyn Jones, Ken Owens, Liam Williams |

Stephen Jones was also selected for the 2005 Lions tour while playing for Clermont Auvergne, while George North was also selected for the 2017 tour while playing for Northampton Saints. Former Scarlets Scott Quinnell, Robin McBryde and Dafydd James were also selected for the Lions on the 2001 tour to Australia while playing for Llanelli RFC. Gareth Davies was brought into the 2017 Lions squad as injury cover towards the end of the tour, but did not play in any games.

=== Notable former internationals ===
Players who have won over 20 international caps and have played for the Scarlets:

- (Wales) Josh Adams
- (Wales) Lee Byrne
- (Wales) Aled Davies
- (Wales) Jonathan Davies
- (Wales) John Davies
- (Wales) Leigh Davies
- (Wales) Rob Evans
- (Wales) Leigh Halfpenny
- (Wales) Kieran Hardy
- (Wales) Dafydd James
- (Wales) Dafydd Jones
- (Wales) Mark Jones
- (Wales) Rhodri Jones
- (Wales) Stephen Jones
- (Wales) Wyn Jones
- (Wales) Samson Lee
- (Wales) Robin McBryde
- (Wales) George North
- (Wales) Ken Owens
- (Wales) Hadleigh Parkes
- (Wales) Rhys Patchell
- (Wales) Dwayne Peel
- (Wales) Mike Phillips
- (Wales) Alix Popham
- (Wales) Andy Powell
- (Wales) Rhys Priestland
- (Wales) Scott Quinnell
- (Wales) Matthew Rees
- (Wales) Aaron Shingler
- (Wales) Mark Taylor
- (Wales) Gareth Thomas
- (Wales) Gavin Thomas
- (Wales) Iestyn Thomas
- (Wales) Liam Williams
- (Wales) Scott Williams
- (Wales) Chris Wyatt
- (Argentina) Tomás Lezana
- (Australia) David Lyons
- (Canada) Jon Thiel
- (Canada) D. T. H. van der Merwe
- (England) Olly Barkley
- (England) Ben Morgan
- (Ireland) Tadhg Beirne
- (Ireland) Guy Easterby
- (Ireland) Simon Easterby
- (New Zealand) Dave Hewett
- (New Zealand) Kees Meeuws
- (Romania) Horațiu Pungea
- (Samoa) Mahonri Schwalger
- (Scotland) John Barclay
- (Scotland) Bruce Douglas
- (Scotland) Sean Lamont
- (Scotland) Scott Macleod
- (South Africa) Herschel Jantjies
- (Tonga) Inoke Afeaki
- (Tonga) Vaea Fifita
- (Tonga) Viliame Iongi
- (Tonga) Sione Kalamafoni
- (Tonga) Sililo Martens
- (United States) Mike Hercus
- (United States) Dave Hodges

== Coaching staff ==
=== First-team management ===
| Name | Title |
|---|---|
| (Wales) Nigel Davies | Director of rugby |
| (Wales) Dwayne Peel | Head coach and attack coach |
| (England) Eamon O'Carroll | Defence coach |
| (New Zealand) Aaron Dundon | Lead forwards coach |
| (South Africa) Albert van den Berg | Forwards and lineout coach |
| (Wales) Bradley Davies | Contact skills coach |
| (Ireland) Shane Carney | Head of Athletic Performance |
| (Wales) Matthew Rees | Head of medical |
| (Wales) Jonathan Daniels | Director and general manager |
| (Wales) James Davies | Recruitment and operations officer |

=== Academy management ===
| Name | Title |
|---|---|
| (Wales) Scott Sneddon | Transition head coach |
| (Wales) Emyr Phillips | Head of Academy |
| (Wales) Phil John | Senior academy coach |
| (Wales) Tom Phillips | Junior academy head coach |
| (Wales) Rhodri Jones | Junior academy coach |

=== Head coaches ===
| Name | Tenure |
|---|---|
| (Wales) Gareth Jenkins | 2003–2006 |
| (Wales) Phil Davies | 2006–2008 |
| (Wales) Nigel Davies | 2008–2012 |
| (Ireland) Simon Easterby | 2012–2014 |
| (New Zealand) Wayne Pivac | 2014–2019 |
| (New Zealand) Brad Mooar | 2019–2020 |
| (New Zealand) Glenn Delaney | 2020–2021 |
| (Wales) Dai Flanagan (interim) | 2021 |
| (Wales) Dwayne Peel | 2021–present |

== Results and statistics ==
=== Seasons ===
- 2003–04 Llanelli Scarlets season
- 2004–05 Llanelli Scarlets season
- 2005–06 Llanelli Scarlets season
- 2006–07 Llanelli Scarlets season
- 2007–08 Llanelli Scarlets season
- 2008–09 Scarlets season
- 2009–10 Scarlets season
- 2010–11 Scarlets season
- 2011–12 Scarlets season
- 2012–13 Scarlets season
- 2013–14 Scarlets season
- 2014–15 Scarlets season
- 2015–16 Scarlets season
- 2016–17 Scarlets season
- 2017–18 Scarlets season
- 2018–19 Scarlets season
- 2019–20 Scarlets season
- 2020–21 Scarlets season
- 2021–22 Scarlets season
- 2022–23 Scarlets season
- 2023–24 Scarlets season
- 2024–25 Scarlets season
- 2025–26 Scarlets season
- 2026–27 Scarlets season

=== Honours ===
- Celtic League/Pro12/Pro14:
  - Winners: 2003–04, 2016–17
  - Runners-up: 2017–18
- United Rugby Championship Welsh Shield
  - Runners-up: 2021–22, 2023–24, 2024–25
- Celtic Cup
  - Runners-up: 2004–05
- Anglo-Welsh Cup
  - Runners-up: 2005–06

=== Celtic League / Pro12 / Pro14 / United Rugby Championship ===
| Season | Position/Round | Played | Won | Drawn | Lost | Bonus | Points |
|---|---|---|---|---|---|---|---|
| 2003–04 | 1st | 22 | 16 | 1 | 5 | 10 | 76 |
| 2004–05 | 5th | 20 | 9 | 0 | 11 | 10 | 46 |
| 2005–06 | 6th | 22 | 10 | 1 | 9 | 7 | 57 (Note: 11 teams were involved in this season, so one team did not play each week and were awarded four points instead. Therefore, each team finished the season with eight more points than the table would seem to warrant.) |
| 2006–07 | 4th | 20 | 12 | 0 | 8 | 9 | 57 |
| 2007–08 | 6th | 18 | 7 | 0 | 11 | 10 | 39 |
| 2008–09 | 5th | 18 | 9 | 0 | 9 | 4 | 40 |
| 2009–10 | 9th | 18 | 5 | 0 | 13 | 9 | 29 |
| 2010–11 | 5th | 22 | 12 | 1 | 9 | 12 | 62 |
| 2011–12 | 5th | 22 | 12 | 2 | 8 | 10 | 62 |
| 2012–13 | 4th | 22 | 15 | 0 | 7 | 6 | 66 |
| 2012–13 | Semi-final | Lost 28–17 v Ulster | | | | | |
| 2013–14 | 6th | 22 | 11 | 1 | 10 | 9 | 55 |
| 2014–15 | 6th | 22 | 11 | 3 | 8 | 7 | 57 |
| 2015–16 | 5th | 22 | 14 | 0 | 8 | 7 | 63 |
| 2016–17 | 3rd | 22 | 17 | 0 | 5 | 9 | 77 |
| 2016–17 | Semi-final | Won 27–15 v Leinster | | | | | |
| 2016–17 | Final | Won 46–22 v Munster | | | | | |
| 2017–18 | 2nd, Conference B | 21 | 14 | 1 | 6 | 12 | 70 |
| 2017–18 | Quarter-final | Won 46–8 v Cheetahs | | | | | |
| 2017–18 | Semi-final | Won 28–13 v Glasgow Warriors | | | | | |
| 2017–18 | Final | Lost 40–32 v Leinster | | | | | |
| 2018–19 | 4th, Conference B | 21 | 10 | 0 | 11 | 12 | 52 |
| 2018–19 | 7th, Champions Cup Play-off | Lost 21–10 v Ospreys | | | | | |
| 2019–20 | 3rd, Conference B | 15 (Note: Only 15 rounds were played during the 2019–20 season due to the COVID-19 pandemic in Europe.) | 10 | 0 | 5 | 7 | 47 |
| 2020–21 | 3rd, Conference B | 16 (Note: Only 16 rounds were played during the 2020–21 season due to the COVID-19 pandemic in Europe, with the remaining matches replaced by the Pro14 Rainbow Cup competition.) | 8 | 0 | 8 | 7 | 39 |
| 2021–22 | 10th | 18 | 8 | 0 | 10 | 13 | 45 |
| 2022–23 | 14th | 18 | 6 | 1 | 11 | 8 | 34 |
| 2023–24 | 13th | 18 | 5 | 0 | 13 | 7 | 27 |
| 2024–25 | 8th | 18 | 9 | 1 | 8 | 10 | 48 |
| 2024–25 | Quarter-final | Lost 33–21 v Leinster | | | | | |
| 2025–26 | 14th | 18 | 4 | 2 | 12 | 8 | 28 |

=== Pro14 Rainbow Cup ===
| Season | Position/Round | Played | Won | Drawn | Lost | Bonus | Points |
|---|---|---|---|---|---|---|---|
| 2020–21 | 7th | 5 | 1 | 2 | 2 | 3 | 13 |

=== Celtic Cup ===
| Season | Round | Match |
|---|---|---|
| 2003–04 | Quarter-final | Llanelli Scarlets 12–14 Connacht |
| 2004–05 | Quarter-final | Newport Gwent Dragons 19–49 Llanelli Scarlets |
| 2004–05 | Semi-final | Llanelli Scarlets 23–15 Neath–Swansea Ospreys |
| 2004–05 | Final | Munster 27–16 Llanelli Scarlets |

=== Heineken Cup / European Champions Cup ===
| Season | Pool/Round | Pos | Played | Won | Drawn | Lost | Bonus | Points |
|---|---|---|---|---|---|---|---|---|
| 2003–04 | Pool 4 | 1st | 6 | 5 | 0 | 1 | 3 | 23 |
| 2003–04 | Quarter-final | Llanelli Scarlets 10–27 Biarritz Olympique | | | | | | |
| 2004–05 | Pool 3 | 3rd | 6 | 2 | 0 | 4 | 5 | 13 |
| 2005–06 | Pool 6 | 3rd | 6 | 2 | 0 | 4 | 4 | 12 |
| 2006–07 | Pool 5 | 1st | 6 | 6 | 0 | 0 | 3 | 27 |
| 2006–07 | Quarter-final | Llanelli Scarlets 24–15 Munster | | | | | | |
| 2006–07 | Semi-final | Leicester Tigers 33–17 Llanelli Scarlets | | | | | | |
| 2007–08 | Pool 5 | 4th | 6 | 0 | 0 | 6 | 0 | 0 |
| 2008–09 | Pool 4 | 4th | 6 | 1 | 1 | 4 | 2 | 8 |
| 2009–10 | Pool 6 | 2nd | 6 | 4 | 0 | 2 | 1 | 17 |
| 2010–11 | Pool 5 | 3rd | 6 | 3 | 0 | 3 | 3 | 15 |
| 2011–12 | Pool 1 | 2nd | 6 | 3 | 0 | 3 | 3 | 15 |
| 2012–13 | Pool 5 | 4th | 6 | 0 | 0 | 6 | 2 | 2 |
| 2013–14 | Pool 4 | 3rd | 6 | 2 | 1 | 3 | 1 | 11 |
| 2014–15 | Pool 3 | 4th | 6 | 2 | 0 | 4 | 0 | 8 |
| 2015–16 | Pool 3 | 4th | 6 | 0 | 0 | 6 | 2 | 2 |
| 2016–17 | Pool 3 | 3rd | 6 | 2 | 1 | 3 | 1 | 11 |
| 2017–18 | Pool 5 | 1st | 6 | 4 | 0 | 2 | 5 | 21 |
| 2017–18 | Quarter-final | Scarlets 29–17 La Rochelle | | | | | | |
| 2017–18 | Semi-final | Leinster 38–16 Scarlets | | | | | | |
| 2018–19 | Pool 4 | 3rd | 6 | 1 | 0 | 5 | 3 | 7 |
| 2020–21 | Pool A | 5th | 2 (Note: Due to the COVID-19 pandemic in Europe, only two pool games were played during the 2020–21 season. The knockout stage commenced with a round of 16 consisting of the top eight teams from each pool.) | 2 | 0 | 0 | 1 | 9 |
| 2020–21 | Round of 16 | Scarlets 14–57 Sale Sharks | | | | | | |
| 2021–22 | Pool B | 12th | 4 | 0 | 1 | 3 | 0 | 2 |
| 2025–26 | Pool 4 | 6th | 4 | 0 | 0 | 4 | 3 | 3 |

=== European Challenge Cup ===
| Season | Pool/Round | Pos | Played | Won | Drawn | Lost | Bonus | Points |
|---|---|---|---|---|---|---|---|---|
| 2009–10 | Quarter-final | Toulon 38–12 Scarlets | | | | | | |
| 2011–12 | Quarter-final | Brive 15–11 Scarlets | | | | | | |
| 2019–20 | Pool 2 | 2nd | 6 | 4 | 0 | 2 | 3 | 19 |
| 2019–20 | Quarter-final | Toulon 11–6 Scarlets | | | | | | |
| 2022–23 | Pool B | 1st | 4 | 4 | 0 | 0 | 2 | 18 |
| 2022–23 | Round of 16 | Scarlets 19–7 Brive | | | | | | |
| 2022–23 | Quarter-final | Scarlets 32–30 Clermont Auvergne | | | | | | |
| 2022–23 | Semi-final | Scarlets 17–35 Glasgow Warriors | | | | | | |
| 2023–24 | Pool 3 | 6th | 0 | 0 | 0 | 4 | 0 | 0 |
| 2024-25 | Pool 3 | 3rd | 4 | 2 | 0 | 2 | 3 | 11 |
| 2024-25 | Round of 16 | Ospreys 36–14 Scarlets | | | | | | |

=== Anglo-Welsh Cup ===
| Season | Group/Round | Pos | Played | Won | Drawn | Lost | Bonus | Points |
|---|---|---|---|---|---|---|---|---|
| 2005–06 | Group C | 1st | 3 | 3 | 0 | 0 | 0 | 12 |
| 2005–06 | Semi-final | Llanelli Scarlets 27–26 Bath | | | | | | |
| 2005–06 | Final | London Wasps 26–10 Llanelli Scarlets | | | | | | |
| 2006–07 | Group C | 3rd | 3 | 1 | 0 | 2 | 1 | 5 |
| 2007–08 | Group D | 2nd | 3 | 2 | 0 | 1 | 3 | 11 |
| 2008–09 | Group D | 2nd | 3 | 2 | 0 | 1 | 0 | 8 |
| 2009–10 | Pool 2 | 2nd | 4 | 2 | 1 | 1 | 1 | 11 |
| 2010–11 | Pool 3 | 3rd | 4 | 2 | 0 | 2 | 1 | 9 |
| 2011–12 | Pool 3 | 1st | 4 | 3 | 0 | 1 | 3 | 15 |
| 2011–12 | Semi-final | Northampton Saints 27–12 Llanelli Scarlets | | | | | | |
| 2012–13 | Pool 3 | 3rd | 4 | 2 | 0 | 2 | 0 | 8 |
| 2013–14 | Pool 4 | 3rd | 4 | 2 | 0 | 2 | 0 | 8 |
| 2014–15 | Pool 3 | 4th | 4 | 1 | 0 | 3 | 1 | 5 |
| 2016–17 | Pool 4 | 4th | 4 | 1 | 0 | 3 | 1 | 5 |
| 2017–18 | Pool 3 | 4th | 4 | 0 | 0 | 4 | 1 | 1 |

== Individual honours and records ==
=== United Rugby Championship ===
United Rugby Championship Team of the Year
The following Scarlets players were selected in the team of the year.

| Season | Players |
|---|---|
| 2006–07 | Simon Easterby, Regan King, Matthew Rees, Iestyn Thomas |
| 2009–10 | Ken Owens |
| 2010–11 | Jonathan Davies, Iestyn Thomas |
| 2011–12 | Ben Morgan |
| 2012–13 | Jonathan Davies, George North |
| 2013–14 | Gareth Davies, Samson Lee, Liam Williams |
| 2014–15 | Liam Williams |
| 2016–17 | James Davies, Ken Owens |
| 2017–18 | Tadhg Beirne, Rob Evans, Hadleigh Parkes, Rhys Patchell, Aaron Shingler |
| 2018–19 | Ken Owens |
| 2022–23 | Vaea Fifita |
| 2024–25 | Blair Murray, Marnus van der Merwe |

United Rugby Championship player records

| Category | Player | Total |
|---|---|---|
| Tries | Gareth Davies | 55 |
| Appearances | Phil John | 192 |
| Points | Rhys Priestland | 770 |
| Successful goal kicks | Rhys Priestland | 270 |

Updated 28 April 2025

United Rugby Championship individual awards

| Category | Player | Season | Total |
|---|---|---|---|
| Top try scorer | Darren Daniel, Barry Davies (joint) | 2006–07 | 7 |
| Top try scorer | Gareth Davies | 2013–14 | 10 |
| Top try scorer | Steff Evans | 2016–17 | 11 |
| Turnover king | Josh Macleod | 2019–20 | — |
| Golden Boot | Ioan Lloyd | 2024–25 | 124 |

United Rugby Championship team awards

- 2012–13: Collision Kings
- 2017–18: Fairplay Award

=== ERC Elite Awards ===
For the 10th anniversary season of the Heineken Cup, ERC, the tournament organisers, introduced the ERC Elite Awards scheme to recognise and reward the players and teams who have made outstanding contributions to the tournament. The Scarlets were awarded the ERC team award for playing 50 games, and Robin McBryde, John Davies, Dafydd James and Iestyn Thomas were recognised for having made 50 appearances in the competition.

== See also ==
- Llanelli RFC
- Scarlet FM
