= 2011–12 Scarlets season =

Scarlets
- 2011–12 season
- Head coach: Nigel Davies
- Chief executive: Mark Davies
- Pro12: 5th
- LV Cup: Semi-final
- Heineken Cup: Group stage (2nd)
- European Challenge Cup: Semi-final
- Top try scorer: League: Liam Williams (5); Andy Fenby (5); All: Liam Williams (8)
- Top points scorer: League: Rhys Priestland (69); All: Rhys Priestland (111)
- Highest home attendance: 14,756 vs Ospreys (26 December 2011)
- Lowest home attendance: 6,188 vs Edinburgh (7 October 2011)
- Average home attendance: 8,709

The 2011–12 season is the ninth in the history of the Scarlets regional side. In this season, they will compete in the Pro12 (formerly known as the Celtic League), the Heineken Cup and the LV Cup.

== Friendlies ==
Date	Opponents	H / A	Result F–A	Scorers	Attendance
13 August 2011	Rotherham Titans	H	37–25	Try: Shingler 29', Fenby 43', Gomer-Davies 53', L. Rees (2) 61', 70'; Con: Rhys Jones (2), J. Williams; Pen: Rhys Jones (2) 5', 54'	
19 August 2011	Clermont Auvergne	A	6–17	Pen: Newton (2)	4,500
27 August 2011	Exeter Chiefs	A	13–16	Try: Rhys Jones 79'; Con: Rhys Jones; Pen: Newton (2) 32', 43'	4,361

== RaboDirect Pro 12 ==
Date	Opponents	H / A	Result F–A	Scorers	Attendance	Table position
4 September 2011	Aironi	H	32–9	Try: R. Thomas 51', Fenby 76'; Con: Newton (2); Pen: Newton (5) 23', 32', 36', 63', 71', Rhys Jones 80+3'	6,493	3rd
10 September 2011	Connacht	A	11–13	Try: Shingler 47'; Pen: Newton (2) 9', 38'	3,408	6th
17 September 2011	Munster	A	12–35	Pen: Newton (3), Ford	7,648	6th
24 September 2011	Leinster	H	10–15	Try: Lee Williams; Con: Newton; Pen: Newton	8,823	7th
1 October 2011	Benetton Treviso	A	10–20	Try: Li. Williams 42'; Con: Newton; Pen: Newton 29'	3,200	11th
7 October 2011	Edinburgh	H	33–17	Try: Warren (2) 15', 48', Pugh 61', R. Thomas 74'; Con: A. Thomas (2); Pen: A. Thomas (3) 12', 23', 69'	6,188	9th
29 October 2011	Ulster	H	24–17	Try: Li. Williams 40', Warren 72'; Con: A. Thomas; Pen: A. Thomas (3) 26', 33', 54', Newton 78'	7,075	7th
5 November 2011	Ospreys	A	9–9	Pen: S. Jones (3) 42', 59', 78'	12,322	8th
25 November 2011	Newport Gwent Dragons	H	22–12	Try: R. Thomas 40'; Con: S. Jones; Pen: S. Jones (5) 3', 18', 31', 68', 78'	7,950	6th
2 December 2011	Ulster	A	17–24	Try: Lamont 2', Iongi 19', Murphy 75'; Con: S. Jones	8,117	7th
26 December 2011	Ospreys	H	22–14	Try: R. Thomas 32'; Con: Priestland; Pen: Priestland (5) 12', 16', 38', 64', 70'	14,756	6th
30 December 2011	Newport Gwent Dragons	A	10–6	Try: J. Edwards 18'; Con: Newton; Pen: A. Thomas 74'	7,571	5th
7 January 2012	Glasgow	H	16–14	Try: G. Davies 40'; Con: Priestland; Pen: Priestland (3) 10', 16', 24'	9,869	5th
9 February 2012	Glasgow	A	9–19	Pen: Newton (3) 23', 54', 60'	2,655	5th
17 February 2012	Leinster	A	13–16	Try: Newton 24'; Con: S. Jones; Pen: S. Jones 7', Newton 58'	16,683	7th
23 February 2012	Benetton Treviso	H	34–20	Try: Turnbull 28', Manu 37', Li. Williams 55', L. Davies 76'; Con: A. Thomas (4); Pen: A. Thomas (2) 62', 72'	6,594	5th
2 March 2012	Connacht	H	38–10	Try: Fenby 16', Rhodri Jones 33', Phillips 56', Murphy 61', John 79'; Con: S. Jones (5); Pen: S. Jones 45'	7,534	6th
24 March 2012	Cardiff Blues	A	26–14	Try: Fenby (2) 36', 44', G. Davies 64', Day 74'; Con: A. Thomas (3)	8,337	6th
30 March 2012	Edinburgh	A	23–26	Try: Fenby 55', J. Davies 66'; Con: Priestland, S. Jones; Pen: Priestland (3) 3', 32', 53'	2,969	6th
15 April 2012	Aironi	A	26–23	Try: J. Edwards 29', Li. Williams 60', Morgan 67'; Con: Priestland; Pen: Priestland (3) 3', 20', 36	3,300	6th
21 April 2012	Munster	H	20–20	Try: Lamont 12', Shingler 61'; Con: Priestland (2); Pen: Priestland (2) 30', 71'	10,741	5th
5 May 2012	Cardiff Blues	H	29–20	Try: G. Davies (2) 24', 49', Li. Williams 70', Penalty try 76'; Con: Priestland (3); Pen: Priestland 6'	13,047	5th

Pos	Club	Pld	W	D	L	F	A	PD	BP	Pts
4	(Scotland) Glasgow	22	13	4	5	445	321	124	5	65
5	(Wales) Scarlets	22	12	2	8	446	373	73	10	62
6	(Ireland) Ulster	22	12	0	10	474	424	50	8	56

== Anglo-Welsh Cup ==
=== Group stage ===
Date	Opponents	H / A	Result F–A	Scorers	Attendance	Pool position
15 October 2011	Leicester Tigers	H	31–3	Try: Murphy (2) 13', 33', Gilbert 35', Li. Williams 68', J. Williams 80+1'; Con: A. Thomas, J. Williams (2)	6,314	3rd
23 October 2011	Cardiff Blues	A	30–3	Try: Warren 2', Myhill 18', Pugh 67', Murphy 74'; Con: A. Thomas (2); Pen: A. Thomas (2) 10', 56'	6,931	1st
28 January 2012	London Irish	H	27–19	Try: Iongi (2) 27', 80+1', Manu 58'; Con: Newton (3); Pen: Newton (2) 13', 69'	8,117	1st
3 February 2012	Sale Sharks	A	14–19	Try: P. Edwards 32'; Pen: Newton (2) 18', 28', S. Jones 72'	3,012	1st

Team	Pld	W	D	L	F	A	PD	BP	Pts
Scarlets	4	3	0	1	102	44	58	3	15
Harlequins	4	2	0	2	112	108	4	3	11
Newcastle Falcons	4	2	0	2	127	93	34	2	10
Gloucester	4	2	0	2	106	73	33	2	10

=== Knock-out stage ===
Date	Round	Opponents	H / A	Result F–A	Scorers	Attendance
11 March 2012	Semi-final	Northampton Saints	A	12–27	Pen: S. Jones (4)	10,377

== Heineken Cup ==
Date	Opponents	H / A	Result F–A	Scorers	Attendance	Pool position
12 November 2011	Castres	H	31–23	Try: Lamont 42', Morgan 50', J. Davies 73'; Con: S. Jones (2); Pen: S. Jones (3) 6', 11', 34', Rhys Priestland 80+3'	7,860	1st
18 November 2011	Northampton Saints	A	28–23	Try: Li. Williams 3', Shingler 20', Gilbert 39', Priestland 62'; Con: Priestland (4)	13,475	1st
10 December 2011	Munster	H	14–17	Try: Shingler 6'; Pen: Priestland (2) 9', 50', S. Jones 68'	13,183	2nd
18 December 2011	Munster	A	13–19	Try: Owens 68'; Con: Priestland; Pen: S. Jones 12', Priestland 56'	25,600	2nd
14 January 2011	Northampton Saints	H	17–29	Try: Iongi 34'; Pen: Priestland (4) 9', 14', 20', 53	9,869	3rd
21 January 2011	Castres	A	16–13	Try: Gilbert 14', Shingler 60'; Pen: Priestland 10', S. Jones	6,631	2nd

Team	Pld	W	D	L	F	A	PD	BP	Pts
(Ireland) Munster	6	6	0	0	163	118	+45	1	25
(Wales) Scarlets	6	3	0	3	119	124	−5	3	15
(England) Northampton Saints	6	2	0	4	176	160	+16	4	12
(France) Castres	6	1	0	5	111	167	−56	3	7

== European Challenge Cup ==
Date	Round	Opponents	H / A	Result F–A	Scorers	Attendance
8 April 2012	Quarter-final	Brive	A	11–15	Try: Li. Williams 59'; Pen: S. Jones (2) 31', 40	7,850

== Statistics ==
Pos.	Name	Celtic League						Anglo-Welsh Cup						Europe						Total						Discipline	
Pos.	Name	Apps	Try	Con	Pen	Drop	Pts	Apps	Try	Con	Pen	Drop	Pts	Apps	Try	Con	Pen	Drop	Pts	Apps	Try	Con	Pen	Drop	Pts	Yellow card	Red card
FB	(Wales) Dan Evans	6+2	0	0	0	0	0	2	0	0	0	0	0	0+2	0	0	0	0	0	8+4	0	0	0	0	0	1	0
FB/WG	(Wales) Dale Ford	2+2	0	0	1	0	3	2	0	0	0	0	0	0	0	0	0	0	0	4+2	0	0	1	0	3	0	0
FB/WG	(Wales) Liam Williams	13+2	5	0	0	0	25	3	1	0	0	0	5	7	2	0	0	0	10	23+2	8	0	0	0	40	0	0
WG	(Wales) Lee Williams	7	1	0	0	0	5	0	0	0	0	0	0	0	0	0	0	0	0	7	1	0	0	0	5	0	0
WG	(Wales) Andy Fenby	14	5	0	0	0	25	1	0	0	0	0	0	1	0	0	0	0	0	16	5	0	0	0	25	0	0
WG	(Wales) Lee Rees	0+1	0	0	0	0	0	0+1	0	0	0	0	0	0	0	0	0	0	0	0+2	0	0	0	0	0	0	0
WG	(Wales) George North	4+3	0	0	0	0	0	0	0	0	0	0	0	5	0	0	0	0	0	9+3	0	0	0	0	0	0	0
WG	(Wales) Iolo Evans	0+1	0	0	0	0	0	0	0	0	0	0	0	0	0	0	0	0	0	0+1	0	0	0	0	0	0	0
WG	(Tonga) Viliame Iongi	3+6	1	0	0	0	5	2+1	2	0	0	0	10	1+3	1	0	0	0	5	6+10	4	0	0	0	20	0	0
WG/CE	(Scotland) Sean Lamont	10+1	2	0	0	0	10	1	0	0	0	0	0	4+1	1	0	0	0	5	15+2	3	0	0	0	15	1	0
CE	(Wales) Rhodri Gomer-Davies	4	0	0	0	0	0	1	0	0	0	0	0	0	0	0	0	0	0	5	0	0	0	0	0	0	0
CE	(Wales) Gareth Maule	12	0	0	0	0	0	3	0	0	0	0	0	1+3	0	0	0	0	0	16+3	0	0	0	0	0	0	0
CE	(Wales) Adam Warren	10+5	3	0	0	0	15	5	1	0	0	0	5	0	0	0	0	0	0	15+5	4	0	0	0	20	0	0
CE	(Wales) Nic Reynolds	6+2	0	0	0	0	0	0+2	0	0	0	0	0	0	0	0	0	0	0	6+4	0	0	0	0	0	0	0
CE	(Wales) Scott Williams	5+1	0	0	0	0	0	0	0	0	0	0	0	6	0	0	0	0	0	11+1	0	0	0	0	0	0	0
CE	(Wales) Jonathan Davies	3+2	1	0	0	0	5	0	0	0	0	0	0	7	1	0	0	0	5	10+2	1	0	0	0	10	0	0
FH/CE	(Wales) Aled Thomas	8+2	0	10	9	0	47	4	0	3	2	0	12	0	0	0	0	0	0	12+2	0	13	11	0	59	0	0
FH/FB	(Wales) Daniel Newton	11+2	1	5	17	0	66	3+1	0	3	4	0	18	1	0	0	0	0	0	15+3	1	8	21	0	84	0	0
FH	(Wales) Rhys Jones	0+1	0	0	1	0	3	0	0	0	0	0	0	0	0	0	0	0	0	0+1	0	0	1	0	3	0	0
FH	(Wales) Jordan Williams	0	0	0	0	0	0	0+1	1	2	0	0	9	0	0	0	0	0	0	0+1	1	2	0	0	9	0	0
FH	(Wales) Stephen Jones	8+3	0	9	10	0	48	1	0	0	4	0	12	4+3	0	2	8	0	28	13+6	0	11	21	0	88	1	0
FH	(Wales) Rhys Priestland	6	0	9	17	0	69	0	0	0	0	0	0	5+2	1	5	9	0	42	11+2	1	9	18	0	111	0	0
SH	(Wales) Rhodri Williams	4+5	0	0	0	0	0	1+1	0	0	0	0	0	1+4	0	0	0	0	0	6+10	0	0	0	0	0	0	0
SH	(New Zealand) Ruki Tipuna	4+1	0	0	0	0	0	1	0	0	0	0	0	0	0	0	0	0	0	5+1	0	0	0	0	0	0	0
SH	(Wales) Gareth Davies	12+6	4	0	0	0	20	2+1	0	0	0	0	0	5+1	0	0	0	0	0	18+8	4	0	0	0	20	0	0
SH	(Wales) Aled Davies	0	0	0	0	0	0	0+1	0	0	0	0	0	0	0	0	0	0	0	0+1	0	0	0	0	0	0	0
SH	(Wales) Tavis Knoyle	1+3	0	0	0	0	0	0	0	0	0	0	0	1+2	0	0	0	0	0	2+5	0	0	0	0	0	0	0
SH	(Wales) Liam Davies	1+3	1	0	0	0	5	1+1	0	0	0	0	0	0	0	0	0	0	0	2+4	1	0	0	0	5	0	0
N8	(England) Ben Morgan	15+1	1	0	0	0	5	0	0	0	0	0	0	6	1	0	0	0	5	19+1	2	0	0	0	10	0	0
N8	(Wales) Kieran Murphy	7+4	2	0	0	0	10	5	3	0	0	0	15	0+3	0	0	0	0	0	12+7	5	0	0	0	25	1	0
FL	(Wales) Josh Turnbull	13+1	1	0	0	0	5	1	0	0	0	0	0	1+1	0	0	0	0	0	15+2	1	0	0	0	5	1	0
FL	(Wales) Rob McCusker	11	0	0	0	0	0	0	0	0	0	0	0	3	0	0	0	0	0	14	0	0	0	0	0	2	0
FL	(Wales) Richie Pugh	2+5	1	0	0	0	5	0+1	1	0	0	0	0	1+1	0	0	0	0	0	3+7	2	0	0	0	10	0	0
FL	(Wales) Johnathan Edwards	12+7	2	0	0	0	10	4	0	0	0	0	0	4+2	0	0	0	0	0	20+9	2	0	0	0	10	2	0
FL	(Wales) Craig Price	0+1	0	0	0	0	0	0	0	0	0	0	0	0	0	0	0	0	0	0+1	0	0	0	0	0	0	0
FL	(Wales) Mat Gilbert	2+3	0	0	0	0	0	4+1	1	0	0	0	5	1+2	2	0	0	0	10	7+6	3	0	0	0	15	0	0
FL	(Wales) Dan Thomas	0	0	0	0	0	0	0+1	0	0	0	0	0	0	0	0	0	0	0	0+1	0	0	0	0	0	0	0
FL	(Wales) Craig Price	0	0	0	0	0	0	0+1	0	0	0	0	0	0	0	0	0	0	0	0+1	0	0	0	0	0	0	0
LK/FL	(Wales) Aaron Shingler	11+4	2	0	0	0	10	1	0	0	0	0	0	5	3	0	0	0	15	17+4	5	0	0	0	25	0	0
LK	(Wales) Dominic Day	17+2	1	0	0	0	5	3+1	0	0	0	0	0	3	0	0	0	0	0	23+3	1	0	0	0	5	1	0
LK	(Wales) Lou Reed	6+5	0	0	0	0	0	1	0	0	0	0	0	3+1	0	0	0	0	0	10+6	0	0	0	0	0	0	0
LK	(Wales) Damien Welch	7+6	0	0	0	0	0	3	0	0	0	0	0	5	0	0	0	0	0	17+6	0	0	0	0	0	0	0
LK	(Wales) Adam Powell	0	0	0	0	0	0	1	0	0	0	0	0	0	0	0	0	0	0	1	0	0	0	0	0	0	0
LK	(Tonga) Sione Timani	6+3	0	0	0	0	0	2+2	0	0	0	0	0	3+3	0	0	0	0	0	11+7	0	0	0	0	0	0	0
HK	(Wales) Emyr Phillips	9+6	1	0	0	0	5	3+1	0	0	0	0	0	0+1	0	0	0	0	0	12+8	1	0	0	0	5	0	0
HK	(Wales) Kirby Myhill	1+4	0	0	0	0	0	2+2	1	0	0	0	5	0+1	0	0	0	0	0	3+7	1	0	0	0	5	0	0
HK	(Wales) Craig Hawkins	0+3	0	0	0	0	0	0+1	0	0	0	0	0	0	0	0	0	0	0	0+4	0	0	0	0	0	0	0
HK	(Wales) Ken Owens	7+4	0	0	0	0	0	0	0	0	0	0	0	1+6	1	0	0	0	5	8+10	1	0	0	0	5	0	0
HK	(Wales) Matthew Rees	5+3	0	0	0	0	0	0	0	0	0	0	0	6	0	0	0	0	0	11+3	0	0	0	0	0	1	0
PR	(Wales) Iestyn Thomas	8+3	0	0	0	0	0	1	0	0	0	0	0	4+1	0	0	0	0	0	13+4	0	0	0	0	0	0	0
PR	(Wales) Rhys Thomas	10+1	4	0	0	0	20	0	0	0	0	0	0	4	0	0	0	0	0	16+1	4	0	0	0	20	2	0
PR	(Wales) Simon Gardiner	0+8	0	0	0	0	0	1+1	0	0	0	0	0	0+1	0	0	0	0	0	1+10	0	0	0	0	0	0	0
PR	(Wales) Rhodri Jones	9+8	1	0	0	0	5	2+1	0	0	0	0	0	2+4	0	0	0	0	0	13+11	1	0	0	0	5	0	0
PR	(Wales) Peter Edwards	1+8	0	0	0	0	0	2+2	1	0	0	0	5	2	0	0	0	0	0	5+10	1	0	0	0	5	1	0
PR	(Wales) Phil John	6+14	1	0	0	0	5	3+2	0	0	0	0	0	1+6	0	0	0	0	0	10+22	1	0	0	0	5	0	0
PR	(Fiji) Deacon Manu	10+2	1	0	0	0	5	1+1	1	0	0	0	5	1+1	0	0	0	0	0	12+3	2	0	0	0	10	1	0

Stats accurate as of match played 5 May 2012

== Transfers ==
=== In ===
Date confirmed	Pos.	Name	From	Ref.
28 June 2011	LK	(Tonga) Sione Timani	Carmarthen Quins	
5 July 2011	CE	(Wales) Rhodri Gomer-Davies	Newport Gwent Dragons	
5 July 2011	FH	(Wales) Rhys Jones	Newport RFC	
5 July 2011	FB	(Wales) Aled Thomas	London Welsh	
28 August 2011	SH	(New Zealand) Ruki Tipuna	Wellington	

=== Out ===
Date confirmed	Pos.	Name	To	Ref.
4 January 2011	BR	(Wales) Dafydd Jones	Retired	
18 January 2011	FH	(Wales) Steven Shingler	London Irish	
4 May 2011	WG	(Wales) Darren Daniel	Cornish Pirates	
1 February 2011	CE	(New Zealand) Regan King	Clermont Auvergne	
18 March 2011	SH	(Wales) Martin Roberts	Northampton Saints	
15 April 2011	LK/FL	(Samoa) Jonny Fa'amatuainu	Released	
26 April 2011	HK	(Wales) Rhys Lawrence	Bristol	
15 June 2011	N8	(Australia) David Lyons	Released	
