= 2013–14 Scarlets season =

Scarlets
- 2013–14 season
- Head coach: Simon Easterby
- Chief executive: Mark Davies
- Chairman: Nigel Short
- Pro12: 6th
- LV Cup: Pool stage, 3rd
- Heineken Cup: Pool stage, 3rd
- Top try scorer: League: Gareth Davies (10); All: Gareth Davies (11)
- Top points scorer: League: Rhys Priestland (107); All: Rhys Priestland (171)
- Highest home attendance: 14,796 v Ospreys, 26 December 2013
- Lowest home attendance: 5,487 v Gloucester, 24 January 2014
- Average home attendance: 7,175

The 2013–14 season was the 11th in the history of the Scarlets, one of the four Welsh regional rugby union sides. In this season, they competed in the Pro12 (formerly known as the Magners League), the Heineken Cup and the LV Cup.

== Pre-season and friendlies ==
Date	Opponents	H / A	Result F–A	Scorers	Attendance
17 August 2013	Exeter Chiefs	H	15–23	Tries: G. Davies 31' c, J. Williams 39' m Conversion: S. Shingler 31'; Penalties: S. Shingler 5'	
25 August 2013	London Welsh	A	16–16	Try: C. Price 80+9' c Conversion: J. Lewis 80+9'; Penalties: A. Thomas 9', 45', J. Lewis 74'	
30 August 2013	Gloucester	A	17–31	Tries: Penalty try 43' c, Owens 55' m, R. Williams 79' m Conversion: Priestland 43'	

== RaboDirect Pro12 ==
=== Fixtures ===
Date	Opponents	H / A	Result F – A	Scorers	Attendance	Table position
6 September 2013	Leinster	H	19–42	Try: McCusker 13' c Conversion: S. Shingler 14'; Penalties: S. Shingler 4', 7', 38', 57'	6,329	12th
14 September 2013	Treviso	H	26–10	Tries: G. Davies 3' c, 14' c Conversion: S. Shingler 4', 15'; Penalties: S. Shingler 45', 57', 65', 71'	5,847	8th
20 September 2013	Dragons	A	16–23	Try: S. Williams 34' c Conversion: Priestland 35'; Penalties: Priestland 17', 27', 45'	6,777	8th
27 September 2013	Edinburgh	A	22–9	Tries: Reynolds 35' c, J. Williams 46' m, J. Davies 72' c Conversion: Priestland 36', 72'; Penalties: Priestland 32'	3,586	6th
5 October 2013	Glasgow Warriors	H	12–17	Penalties: Priestland 17', 39', 42', J. Williams 59'	6,504	8th
25 October 2013	Zebre	A	16–16	Try: G. Davies 24' c Conversion: S. Shingler 24'; Penalties: S. Shingler 4', Priestland 79', 80+2'	1,560	8th
2 November 2013	Ulster	H	17–9	Try: Barclay 31' m Penalties: S. Shingler 9', A. Thomas 40', 64', 77'	6,506	6th
23 November 2013	Connacht	A	24–21	Tries: Climo 38' c, K. Myhill 47' c, G. Davies 52' c Conversion: A. Thomas 38', 48', 53'; Penalties: A. Thomas 21'	4,172	6th
30 November 2013	Leinster	A	19–36	Tries: G. Davies 47' m, Maule 58' c, Ad. Warren 80' c Conversion: A. Thomas 59', 80+1'	17,800	6th
21 December 2013	Munster	A	10–16	Try: Barclay 43' c Conversion: A. Thomas 45'; Penalties: A. Thomas	7,867	7th
26 December 2013	Ospreys	H	6–10	Penalties: Priestland 7', 49'	14,796	8th
3 January 2014	Ospreys	A	12–17	Penalties: Priestland 38', 54', 59', 75'	13,201	8th
8 February 2014	Treviso	A	41–33	Tries: K. Myhill 25' m, Climo 37' m, 42' c, G. Davies 46' c, K. Phillips 64' c, J. Williams 78' c Conversion: A. Thomas 42', 46', 64', 78'; Penalties: A. Thomas 9'	2,918	6th
22 February 2014	Edinburgh	H	25–21	Tries: J. Williams 29' c, 37' m, A. Warren 56' c Conversion: A. Thomas 31', 58'; Penalties: A. Thomas 15', 21'	5,675	6th
1 March 2014	Munster	H	18–13	Tries: G. Davies 27' m, Barclay 51' c Conversion: A. Thomas 53'; Penalties: Barkley 13', A. Thomas 50'	6,487	6th
14 March 2014	Ulster	A	13–26	Try: G. Davies 36' c Conversion: Barkley 37'; Penalties: Barkley 32', 62'	11,200	6th
21 March 2014	Glasgow	A	6–14	Penalties: Barkley 26', 50'		6th
30 March 2014	Connacht	H	32–30	Tries: J. Davies 2' c, G. Davies 49' c, Turnbull 52' m, Maule 79' c Conversion: Priestland 4', 50', 80'; Penalties: Priestland 24', 34'	6,111	6th
12 April 2014	Zebre	H	27–20	Tries: J. Williams 43' c, Owens 52' m Conversion: Priestland 44'; Penalties: Priestland 3', 9', 37', 58', 69'	6,708	6th
20 April 2014	Cardiff Blues	A	13–17	Tries: Priestland 33' m, Owens 71' m Penalties: Priestland 40+2'	30,000	6th
2 May 2014	Newport Gwent Dragons	H	34–23	Tries: Ball 16' c, G. Davies 27' c, J. Williams 31' c, Owens 48' c Conversion: Priestland 16', 27', 33', 48'; Penalties: Priestland 25', 69'	5,850	6th
10 May 2014	Cardiff Blues	H	27–15	Tries: R. Williams 13' c, L. Williams 44' c, S. Shingler 75' c Conversion: Priestland 13', S. Shingler 44', 75'; Penalties: Priestland 40', S. Shingler 70'	9,046	6th

=== Table ===
Pos	Club	Pld	W	D	L	F	A	PD	BP	Pts
5	(Wales) Ospreys	22	13	1	8	571	388	183	12	66
6	(Wales) Scarlets	22	11	1	10	435	438	−3	9	55
7	(Wales) Blues	22	8	1	13	425	538	−113	7	41

== Anglo-Welsh Cup ==
=== Fixtures ===
Date	Opponents	H / A	Result F–A	Scorers	Attendance	Pool position
8 November 2013	Dragons	H	21–13	Tries: Knight 58' m, McCusker 63' c Conversion: Lewis 64'; Penalties: A. Thomas 8', 19', Lewis 74'	5,971	3rd
17 November 2013	Saracens	A	10–51	Try: D. Thomas 28' c Conversion: Lewis 28'; Penalties: Lewis 22'	4,166	3rd
24 January 2014	Gloucester	H	13–7	Tries: Hughes 34' m, Aa. Warren 77' m Penalties: Lewis 60'	5,487	2nd
1 February 2014	London Irish	A	10–29	Try: Earle 73' c Conversion: Owen 74'; Penalties: Lewis 8'	5,320	3rd

=== Table ===
Club	Pld	W	D	L	F	A	PD	BP	Pts
Northampton Saints	4	4	0	0	126	56	70	2	18
Newcastle Falcons	4	2	0	2	69	82	−13	0	9
Scarlets	4	2	0	2	54	100	−46	0	8
London Wasps	4	1	0	3	56	95	−39	1	5

== Heineken Cup ==
=== Fixtures ===
Date	Opponents	H / A	Result F–A	Scorers	Attendance	Pool position
12 October 2013	Harlequins	A	33–26	Tries: R. Williams 7' c, S. Williams 39' c, J. Williams 62' c Conversion: Priestland 8', 40', 64'; Penalties: Priestland 11', 14', 49', 53',	13,000	1st
19 October 2013	Racing Metro 92	H	26–26	Tries: S. Williams 21' c, R. Williams 40' c Conversion: Priestland 22', 40+1'; Penalties: Priestland 19', 35', 44', 65'	8,388	1st
7 December 2013	ASM Clermont Auvergne	A	11–32	Try: R. Williams 78' m Penalties: Priestland 15', J. Williams 47'	17,140	2nd
14 December 2013	ASM Clermont Auvergne	H	13–31	Try: Maule 31' c Conversion: Priestland 33'; Penalties: Priestland 22', 38'	7,591	3rd
10 January 2014	Racing Metro 92	A	19–13	Try: K. Phillips 61' c Conversion: Priestland 62'; Penalties: Priestland 4', 38', 48', 54'	6,892	3rd
19 January 2014	Harlequins	H	20–22	Tries: G. Davies 6' c, A. Shingler 39' m, S. Williams 50' m Conversion: Priestland 7'; Penalties: Priestland 35'	7,516	3rd

=== Table ===
Team	Pld	W	D	L	F	A	PD	BP	Pts
(France) ASM Clermont Auvergne	6	5	0	1	139	69	70	4	24
(England) Harlequins	6	3	0	3	126	103	23	4	16
(Wales) Scarlets	6	2	1	3	122	150	−28	1	11
(France) Racing Metro 92	6	1	1	4	66	131	−65	1	7

== Transfers ==
=== In ===
Date confirmed	Pos.	Name	From
21 January 2013	FH/CE/FB	(Wales) Steven Shingler	London Irish
22 April 2013	FL	(Scotland) John Barclay	Glasgow
28 June 2013	HK	(Wales) Darran Harris	Cardiff Blues/Pontypridd
24 August 2013	WG/FB/FH	(New Zealand) Frazier Climo	Taranaki
20 October 2013	WG	(Wales) Mike Poole	Unattached/Dragons
20 October 2013	PR	(Romania) Horațiu Pungea	RC Timişoara
15 November 2013	PR	(England) Adam Jamieson	Bath (Loan)
3 February 2014	FH/CE	(England) Olly Barkley	Unattached

=== Out ===
Date Confirmed	Pos.	Name	To
25 January 2013	HK	(Wales) Matthew Rees	Cardiff Blues
9 March 2013	FH	(Wales) Owen Williams	Leicester Tigers
15 March 2013	WG	(Wales) Andrew Fenby	London Irish
9 April 2013	WG	(Wales) George North	Northampton Saints
23 April 2013	SH	(Wales) Tavis Knoyle	Gloucester
23 April 2013	FH/FB	(Wales) Daniel Newton	London Scottish
27 April 2013	PR	(Wales) Peter Edwards	Released/London Welsh
27 April 2013	WG/FB	(Wales) Dale Ford	Released/Neath
27 April 2013	FL	(Wales) Richie Pugh	Released
27 April 2013	FH	(Wales) Rhys Jones	Newport Gwent Dragons
7 May 2013	N8	(Wales) Kieran Murphy	Released/Brive
7 May 2013	FL	(Wales) Johnathan Edwards	Released/Cardiff

=== New development contracts ===
Date Confirmed	Pos.	Name	From
21 June 2013	WG	(Wales) Aaron Warren	Llandovery
21 June 2013	FB	(Wales) Dion Jones	Llanelli
21 June 2013	BR	(Wales) Lewis Rawlins	Llanelli
21 June 2013	PR	(Wales) Gareth Thomas	Carmarthen Quins
21 June 2013	SR	(Wales) Carwyn Jones	Carmarthen Quins
21 June 2013	BR	(Wales) Sion Bennett	Carmarthen Quins
2 July 2013	FH	(Wales) Josh Lewis	Ebbw Vale

== Statistics ==
(+ in the Apps column denotes substitute appearance)

Pos.	Name	Celtic League						Anglo-Welsh Cup						Europe						Total						Discipline	
Pos.	Name	Apps	Try	Con	Pen	Drop	Pts	Apps	Try	Con	Pen	Drop	Pts	Apps	Try	Con	Pen	Drop	Pts	Apps	Try	Con	Pen	Drop	Pts	Yellow card	Red card
FB/WG	(Wales) Liam Williams	13	1	0	0	0	5	0	0	0	0	0	0	4	0	0	0	0	0	17	1	0	0	0	5	1	1
FB/WG	(Wales) Jordan Williams	15+3	6	0	1	0	33	3	0	0	0	0	0	5	1	0	1	0	8	23+3	7	0	2	0	41	0	0
FB/FH/CE	(Wales) Gareth Owen	8+1	0	0	0	0	0	2+1	0	1	0	0	2	0	0	0	0	0	0	10+2	0	1	0	0	2	2	0
WG	(Wales) Kristian Phillips	15+1	1	0	0	0	5	2+1	0	0	0	0	0	3	1	0	0	0	5	19+2	2	0	0	0	10	0	0
WG	(Wales) Chris Knight	0	0	0	0	0	0	2	1	0	0	0	5	0	0	0	0	0	0	2	1	0	0	0	5	0	0
WG	(New Zealand) Frazier Climo	8+1	3	0	0	0	15	2	0	0	0	0	0	2	0	0	0	0	0	12+1	3	0	0	0	15	0	0
WG	(Wales) Aaron Warren	0	0	0	0	0	0	2+1	1	0	0	0	5	0	0	0	0	0	0	2+1	1	0	0	0	5	0	0
WG	(Wales) Mike Poole	0+1	0	0	0	0	0	0	0	0	0	0	0	0	0	0	0	0	0	0+1	0	0	0	0	0	1	0
WG	(Wales) Kyle Evans	0	0	0	0	0	0	0+1	0	0	0	0	0	0	0	0	0	0	0	0+1	0	0	0	0	0	0	0
CE	(Wales) Scott Williams	7	1	0	0	0	5	0	0	0	0	0	0	6	3	0	0	0	15	13	4	0	0	0	20	0	0
CE	(Wales) Adam Warren	6+4	2	0	0	0	10	2+1	0	0	0	0	0	0+2	0	0	0	0	0	8+7	2	0	0	0	10	0	0
CE	(Wales) Jonathan Davies	11+1	2	0	0	0	10	1	0	0	0	0	0	2	0	0	0	0	0	14+1	2	0	0	0	10	0	0
CE/WG	(Wales) Nic Reynolds	8+1	1	0	0	0	5	0	0	0	0	0	0	4	0	0	0	0	0	12+1	1	0	0	0	5	0	0
CE/WG	(Wales) Gareth Maule	8+10	2	0	0	0	10	1	0	0	0	0	0	2+2	1	0	0	0	5	11+12	3	0	0	0	15	1	0
CE	(Wales) Steffan Hughes	0	0	0	0	0	0	2	1	0	0	0	5	0	0	0	0	0	0	2	1	0	0	0	5	0	0
CE	(Wales) Dylan Morgans	0	0	0	0	0	0	1	0	0	0	0	0	0	0	0	0	0	0	1	0	0	0	0	0	0	0
CE/FH	(England) Olly Barkley	7+1	0	1	5	0	17	0	0	0	0	0	0	0	0	0	0	0	0	7+1	0	1	5	0	17	0	0
FH/CE	(Wales) Steven Shingler	6+2	1	6	11	0	50	0	0	0	0	0	0	0+1	0	0	0	0	0	6+3	1	6	11	0	50	0	0
FH	(Wales) Rhys Priestland	12+2	1	12	26	0	107	0	0	0	0	0	0	6	0	8	16	0	64	18+2	1	20	42	0	171	0	0
FH	(Wales) Aled Thomas	8+3	0	13	9	0	53	1+2	0	0	2	0	6	2+1	0	0	0	0	0	11+6	0	13	11	0	59	0	0
FH	(Wales) Josh Lewis	0+2	0	0	0	0	0	3+1	0	2	4	0	16	0	0	0	0	0	0	3+3	0	2	4	0	16	0	0
SH	(Wales) Gareth Davies	16+3	10	0	0	0	55	0+2	0	0	0	0	0	4+1	1	0	0	0	0	19+6	11	0	0	0	55	1	0
SH	(Wales) Rhodri Williams	6+9	1	0	0	0	5	0	0	0	0	0	0	2+3	3	0	0	0	15	8+12	4	0	0	0	20	0	0
SH	(Wales) Aled Davies	0+7	0	0	0	0	0	4	0	0	0	0	0	0	0	0	0	0	0	4+7	0	0	0	0	0	0	0
SH	(Wales) Connor Lloyd	0	0	0	0	0	0	0+1	0	0	0	0	0	0	0	0	0	0	0	0+1	0	0	0	0	0	0	0
FL/N8	(Wales) Rob McCusker	14	1	0	0	0	5	3	1	0	0	0	5	3	0	0	0	0	0	20	2	0	0	0	10	0	0
FL/N8	(Wales) Josh Turnbull	19+2	1	0	0	0	5	1	0	0	0	0	0	4+2	0	0	0	0	0	24+4	1	0	0	0	5	1	0
FL	(Wales) Craig Price	0+1	0	0	0	0	0	3	0	0	0	0	0	0+1	0	0	0	0	0	3+2	0	0	0	0	0	0	0
FL	(Wales) Aaron Shingler	11+3	0	0	0	0	0	0	0	0	0	0	0	5	1	0	0	0	5	16+3	1	0	0	0	5	2	0
FL	(Scotland) John Barclay	16+1	3	0	0	0	15	0	0	0	0	0	0	6	0	0	0	0	0	22+1	3	0	0	0	15	1	0
FL	(Wales) Daniel Thomas	0+1	0	0	0	0	0	2	0	0	0	0	0	0	0	0	0	0	0	2+1	0	0	0	0	0	0	0
FL	(Wales) James Davies	0	0	0	0	0	0	0+2	0	0	0	0	0	0	0	0	0	0	0	0+2	0	0	0	0	0	0	0
FL	(Wales) Lewis Rawlins	0+1	0	0	0	0	0	2+1	0	0	0	0	0	0	0	0	0	0	0	2+2	0	0	0	0	0	0	0
LK/FL/N8	(Tonga) Sione Timani	6+7	0	0	0	0	0	1	0	0	0	0	0	0	0	0	0	0	0	7+7	0	0	0	0	0	2	0
LK	(South Africa) George Earle	17+1	0	0	0	0	0	0+1	1	0	0	0	5	5	0	0	0	0	0	22+2	1	0	0	0	5	0	0
LK	(South Africa) Jake Ball	13+5	1	0	0	0	5	0+1	0	0	0	0	0	6	0	0	0	0	0	19+7	1	0	0	0	5	1	0
LK	(South Africa) Johan Snyman	12+7	0	0	0	0	0	4	0	0	0	0	0	1+5	0	0	0	0	0	17+12	0	0	0	0	0	0	0
LK	(Wales) Richard Kelly	2+8	0	0	0	0	0	4	0	0	0	0	0	0+2	0	0	0	0	0	6+10	0	0	0	0	0	0	0
LK	(Wales) Carwyn Jones	0	0	0	0	0	0	0+2	0	0	0	0	0	0	0	0	0	0	0	0+2	0	0	0	0	0	0	0
HK	(Wales) Ken Owens	11+2	3	0	0	0	15	0	0	0	0	0	0	1+1	0	0	0	0	0	12+3	3	0	0	0	15	0	0
HK	(Wales) Emyr Phillips	6+10	0	0	0	0	0	0	0	0	0	0	0	5+1	0	0	0	0	0	11+11	0	0	0	0	0	0	0
HK	(Wales) Kirby Myhill	5+4	2	0	0	0	10	2	0	0	0	0	0	0	0	0	0	0	0	7+4	2	0	0	0	10	0	0
HK	(Wales) Darran Harris	0	0	0	0	0	0	2+2	1	0	0	0	5	0	0	0	0	0	0	2+2	1	0	0	0	5	0	0
HK	(Wales) Ryan Elias	0	0	0	0	0	0	0+1	0	0	0	0	0	0	0	0	0	0	0	0+1	0	0	0	0	0	0	0
HK	(Wales) Torin Myhill	0	0	0	0	0	0	0+1	0	0	0	0	0	0	0	0	0	0	0	0+1	0	0	0	0	0	0	0
PR	(Wales) Samson Lee	13+3	0	0	0	0	0	0	0	0	0	0	0	5	0	0	0	0	0	18+3	0	0	0	0	0	1	0
PR	(Wales) Phil John	20+1	0	0	0	0	0	0	0	0	0	0	0	4	0	0	0	0	0	24+1	0	0	0	0	0	0	0
PR	(South Africa) Jacobie Adriaanse	7+5	0	0	0	0	0	1+3	0	0	0	0	0	1+1	0	0	0	0	0	9+9	0	0	0	0	0	1	0
PR	(Wales) Rob Evans	2+18	0	0	0	0	0	3	0	0	0	0	0	2+4	0	0	0	0	0	7+22	0	0	0	0	0	3	0
PR	(Fiji) Deacon Manu	0+1	0	0	0	0	0	1	0	0	0	0	0	0	0	0	0	0	0	1+1	0	0	0	0	0	0	0
PR	(Wales) Rhodri Jones	2+7	0	0	0	0	0	1	0	0	0	0	0	0+1	0	0	0	0	0	3+8	0	0	0	0	0	0	0
PR	(Romania) Horațiu Pungea	0+3	0	0	0	0	0	0+1	0	0	0	0	0	0	0	0	0	0	0	0+4	0	0	0	0	0	0	0
PR	(Wales) Shaun Hopkins	0+2	0	0	0	0	0	1+1	0	0	0	0	0	0+1	0	0	0	0	0	1+4	0	0	0	0	0	0	0
PR	(Wales) Gareth Thomas	0	0	0	0	0	0	0+1	0	0	0	0	0	0	0	0	0	0	0	0+1	0	0	0	0	0	0	0
PR	(Wales) Ian Jones	0+1	0	0	0	0	0	1	0	0	0	0	0	0	0	0	0	0	0	1+1	0	0	0	0	0	0	0
PR	(England) Adam Jamieson	0	0	0	0	0	0	0+1	0	0	0	0	0	0	0	0	0	0	0	0+1	0	0	0	0	0	0	0
PR	(Wales) Wyn Jones	0	0	0	0	0	0	0+2	0	0	0	0	0	0	0	0	0	0	0	0+2	0	0	0	0	0	0	0

Stats accurate as of match played 20 April 2014
