= 2010–11 Scarlets season =

Scarlets
- 2010–11 season
- Head coach: Nigel Davies
- Chief executive: Paul Sergeant
- Magners League: 5th
- LV Cup: Pool stage (2nd)
- Heineken Cup: Pool stage (3rd)
- Top try scorer: League: Jonathan Davies (9); All: Jonathan Davies (10)
- Top points scorer: League: Rhys Priestland (158); All: Rhys Priestland (215)
- Average home attendance: 7,047

The 2010–11 season was the eighth in the history of the Scarlets regional rugby union team. They competed in the Magners League, the LV Cup and the Heineken Cup

== Pre-season and friendlies ==
Date	Opponents	H / A	Result F – A	Scorers	Attendance
14 August 2010	Gloucester	A	6 – 26	Penalties: Shingler (2)	5,822
21 August 2010	Worcester	H	43 – 14	Tries: Priestland 12', King 28', Roberts (2) 38', 52', Welch 55', Maule 65', Conversions: Priestland (5) 12', 28', 38', 52', 55', Penalties: Priestland 20'	
27 August 2010	Exeter Chiefs	H	24 – 20	Tries: R. Thomas, I. Thomas, Fenby, John; Conversions: Priestland (2)	

== Magners League ==
=== Results ===
Date	Opponents	H / A	Result F – A	Scorers	Attendance
4 September 2010	Benetton Treviso	A	34 – 28	Tries: Priestland 6', North (2) 16', 40'; Conversions:Priestland (2) 7', 40+1'; Penalties:Priestland (3) 29', 66', 70'	5,000
11 September 2010	Connacht	H	35 – 33	Tries: J. Davies (2) 23', 73', King 40+3', Lamont 80+7'; Conversions: S. Jones (3) 24', 40+3', 74'; Penalties: S. Jones (3) 22', 26', 61',	6,436
17 September 2010	Aironi	H	49 – 10	Tries: Fenby 30', North 40+1', J. Davies (3) 51', 62', 80', Roberts 70'; Conversions: S. Jones (5) 31', 52', 63', 71', 80+1'; Penalties: S. Jones (3) 10', 16', 41'	6,123
24 September 2010	Dragons	A	27 – 14	Tries: North 6', J. Davies 29', Rees 34', Conversions: S. Jones (3) 7', 30', 35', Penalties: S. Jones (2) 30', 80',	6,118
2 October 2010	Ospreys	H	18 – 21	Penalties: S. Jones (6) 4', 23', 40+2', 42', 48', 67',	13,707
22 October 2010	Cardiff Blues	A	16 – 10	Try: Priestland 63'; Conversion: S. Jones 64', Penalties: Priestland (3) 10', 25', 38',	14,026
29 October 2010	Glasgow	H	18 – 14	Penalties: Priestland (6) 7', 16', 34', 36', 47', 73',	7,149
21 November 2010	Munster	A	27 - 26	Tries: J. Edwards (2) 40', 58'; Conversions: Priestland (2) 40', 59'; Penalties: Priestland (4) 17', 33', 46', 67'	5,234
27 November 2010	Aironi	A	34-17	Tries: Stoddart 36', 79', J. Edwards 69', Maule 74'; Conversion: Priestland 37'; Penalties: Priestland 31', 48', 60'; Drop goal: Priestland 40'	2,000
3 December 2010	Leinster	H	17-17	Try: Maule 66'; Penalties: Priestland 5', 29', 39', 58'	5,142
27 December 2010	Ospreys	A	17-60	Tries: Maule 53', Fa'amatuainu 75'; Conversions: Priestland 54', 76'; Penalty: Priestland 5'	18,151
1 January 2011	Dragons	A	21-15	Tries: Maule 41', Priestland 72'; Conversion: Priestland 42'; Penalties: Priestland 17', 46', 78'	9,671
8 January 2011	Edinburgh	A			
12 February 2011	Connacht	A			
18 February 2011	Ulster	H			
24 February 2011	Edinburgh	H			
4 March 2011	Leinster	A			
27 March 2011	Benetton Treviso	H			
1 April 2011	Ulster	A			
16 April 2011	Munster	H			
22 April 2011	Glasgow	A			
6 May 2011	Cardiff Blues	H			

=== Table ===
Pos	Club	Pld	W	D	L	F	A	PD	BP	Pts
4	(Wales) Ospreys	22	12	1	9	553	418	135	13	63
5	(Wales) Scarlets	22	12	1	9	503	453	50	12	62
6	(Wales) Cardiff Blues	22	13	1	8	479	392	87	6	60

== Anglo-Welsh Cup ==
=== Fixtures ===
Date	Opponents	H / A	Result F – A	Scorers	Attendance	Pool position
6 November 2010	Leeds Carnegie	H	52 – 13	Tries: Fa'amatuainu (3) 13', 32', 65', S. Williams (2) 34', 80+3', Newton 40', A. Shingler 80+1'; Conversions: Newton (3) 14', 33', 35', Evans 40+1', S. Shingler (3) 66', 80+2', 80+4'; Penalties: Newton26',	5,013	
14 November 2011	London Irish	A	25 – 16	Try: L. Williams 63'; Conversion: S. Shingler 64', Penalties: S. Shingler (6) 13', 18', 24', 30', 75', 80+1',	9,975	
29 January 2011	Saracens	H	7 – 34	Try: Phillips 68'; Conversion: S. Shingler 69'	6,610	
6 February 2011	Dragons	A	9 – 26	Penalties: Evans (3) 18', 40+1', 46',	4,628	3rd

=== Table ===
Team	Pld	W	D	L	F	A	+/−	BP	Pts
(England) Gloucester	4	3	0	1	119	52	67	4	16
(England) Northampton Saints	4	2	1	1	108	86	22	1	11
(Wales) Scarlets	4	2	0	2	93	89	4	1	9
(England) Sale Sharks	4	2	0	2	89	109	−20	1	9

== Heineken Cup ==
=== Fixtures ===
Date	Opponents	H / A	Result F – A	Scorers	Attendance	Pool position
9 October 2010	Perpignan	H	43 – 34	Tries: Priestland (2) 35', 38', King 44', S. Jones 46'; Conversions: S. Jones (4) 35', 39', 45', 47', Penalties:S. Jones (5) 2', 12', 19', 28', 66',	8,911	1st
17 October 2010	Leicester Tigers	A	10 – 46	Try: Stoddart 13'; Conversion: S. Jones 14', Penalty: S. Jones 39'	19,160	3rd
11 December 2010	Benetton Treviso	H	35 – 27	Tries: Lamont (2) 1', 60', King 23', Turnbull 43', Conversions: S. Jones 2', Priestland (2) 24', 44'; Penalties: S. Jones 5', Priestland (2) 26', 37',	6,421	2nd
18 December 2011	Benetton Treviso	A	38 – 15	Tries: Day 28', Newton 37', Maule 59', Fa'amatuainu 76', Conversions: Priestland (3) 29', 60' 77', Penalties: Priestland (3) 10', 18', 71', Newton 46',	3,800	1st
15 January 2011	Leicester Tigers	H	18 – 32	Tries: Stoddart 19', Lamont 80', Conversion: S. Jones 20', Penalties: S. Jones 31', 45',	12,392	3rd
23 January 2011	Perpignan	A	5 – 37	Try: J. Davies 44'	13,719	3rd

=== Table ===
Team	Pld	W	D	L	F	A	PD	TF	TA	TD	BP	Pts
(France) Perpignan	6	4	1	1	196	112	84	23	9	14	4	22
(England) Leicester Tigers	6	4	1	1	118	97	25	25	10	15	4	22
(Wales) Scarlets	6	3	0	3	149	191	−42	16	24	−8	3	15
(Italy) Benetton Treviso	6	0	0	6	109	248	−139	11	32	21	1	1

== Statistics ==
Pos.	Name	Celtic League						Anglo-Welsh Cup						Europe						Total						Discipline	
Pos.	Name	Apps	Try	Con	Pen	Drop	Pts	Apps	Try	Con	Pen	Drop	Pts	Apps	Try	Con	Pen	Drop	Pts	Apps	Try	Con	Pen	Drop	Pts	Yellow card	Red card
FB	(Wales) Dan Evans	8+3	0	0	0	0	0	4	0	1	3	0	11	0+1	0	0	0	0	0	12+4	0	1	3	0	11	0	0
FB/WG	(Wales) Morgan Stoddart	13	5	0	0	0	25	0	0	0	0	0	0	6	2	0	0	0	10	19	7	0	0	0	35	1	0
FB	(Wales) Jonny Lewis	0	0	0	0	0	0	0+1	0	0	0	0	0	0	0	0	0	0	0	0+1	0	0	0	0	0	0	0
WG	(Nigeria) Joe Ajuwa	3	0	0	0	0	0	2	0	0	0	0	0	0	0	0	0	0	0	5	0	0	0	0	0	0	0
WG	(Wales) Darren Daniel	1	0	0	0	0	0	1	0	0	0	0	0	0	0	0	0	0	0	2	0	0	0	0	0	0	0
WG	(Wales) Andy Fenby	4	1	0	0	0	5	0+1	0	0	0	0	0	0	0	0	0	0	0	4+1	1	0	0	0	5	0	0
WG	(Wales) Lee Williams	2+4	0	0	0	0	0	3	1	0	0	0	5	0+3	0	0	0	0	0	5+7	2	0	0	0	5	0	0
WG	(Scotland) Sean Lamont	12	3	0	0	0	15	0	0	0	0	0	0	6	3	0	0	0	15	18	6	0	0	0	30	1	0
WG	(Wales) Lee Rees	0+1	0	0	0	0	0	1+1	0	0	0	0	0	0	0	0	0	0	0	1+2	0	0	0	0	0	0	0
WG	(Wales) George North	11	5	0	0	0	25	1	0	0	0	0	0	0	0	0	0	0	0	12	5	0	0	0	25	0	0
CE	(Wales) Jonathan Davies	7+2	9	0	0	0	45	0	0	0	0	0	0	2	1	0	0	0	5	9+2	10	0	0	0	50	2	0
CE	(New Zealand) Regan King	19+2	1	0	0	0	5	0	0	0	0	0	0	4	2	0	0	0	10	23+2	3	0	0	0	15	1	0
CE	(Wales) Gareth Maule	17+2	5	0	0	0	25	0	0	0	0	0	0	6	1	0	0	0	5	23+2	6	0	0	0	30	0	0
CE	(Wales) Nic Reynolds	3+2	1	0	0	0	5	4	0	0	0	0	0	0	0	0	0	0	0	7+2	1	0	0	0	5	0	0
CE	(Wales) Scott Williams	5+7	0	0	0	0	0	3	2	0	0	0	10	0+3	0	0	0	0	0	8+10	2	0	0	0	10	1	0
CE	(Wales) Rheon James	0	0	0	0	0	0	1	0	0	0	0	0	0	0	0	0	0	0	1	0	0	0	0	0	0	0
CE	(Wales) Jake Randall	0	0	0	0	0	0	0+1	0	0	0	0	0	0	0	0	0	0	0	0+1	0	0	0	0	0	0	0
CE	(Wales) Iolo Evans	0	0	0	0	0	0	0+1	0	0	0	0	0	0	0	0	0	0	0	0+1	0	0	0	0	0	0	0
FH	(Wales) Stephen Jones	8+4	0	19	21	0	101	0	0	0	0	0	0	5	1	7	9	0	46	13+4	1	24	28	0	147	0	0
FH/FB	(Wales) Daniel Newton	6+2	0	1	4	0	14	1	1	3	1	0	14	1+1	1	0	1	0	8	7+3	2	4	6	0	36	0	0
FH/FB	(Wales) Rhys Priestland	14+5	3	13	37	2	158	0	0	0	0	0	0	6	2	5	5	0	25	18+5	5	18	42	2	183	0	0
FH	(Wales) Steven Shingler	0	0	0	0	0	0	2+1	0	5	6	0	32	0	0	0	0	0	0	2+1	0	5	6	0	32	0	0
FH	(Wales) Jordan Williams	0	0	0	0	0	0	0+1	0	0	0	0	0	0	0	0	0	0	0	0+1	0	0	0	0	0	0	0
FH	(Wales) Owen Williams	0	0	0	0	0	0	1	0	0	0	0	0	0	0	0	0	0	0	1	0	0	0	0	0	0	0
SH	(Wales) Gareth Davies	2+3	0	0	0	0	0	2+1	0	0	0	0	0	0	0	0	0	0	0	4+4	0	0	0	0	0	0	0
SH	(Wales) Tavis Knoyle	13+6	2	0	0	0	10	0	0	0	0	0	0	4+2	0	0	0	0	0	17+8	2	0	0	0	10	1	0
SH	(Wales) Martin Roberts	7+7	1	0	0	0	5	2+1	0	0	0	0	0	2+3	0	0	0	0	0	11+11	1	0	0	0	5	2	0
N8	(Australia) David Lyons	8+3	0	0	0	0	0	0+1	0	0	0	0	0	4	0	0	0	0	0	12+4	0	0	0	0	0	0	0
N8	(England) Ben Morgan	13+2	2	0	0	0	10	3	0	0	0	0	0	2+2	0	0	0	0	0	18+4	2	0	0	0	10	0	0
FL	(Wales) Nic Cudd	0+1	0	0	0	0	0	2+2	0	0	0	0	0	0	0	0	0	0	0	2+3	0	0	0	0	0	0	0
FL	(Wales) Johnathan Edwards	16+2	4	0	0	0	20	1	0	0	0	0	0	1+3	0	0	0	0	0	18+5	4	0	0	0	20	1	0
FL	(Wales) Rob McCusker	14+3	0	0	0	0	0	0	0	0	0	0	0	5	0	0	0	0	0	19+3	0	0	0	0	0	0	0
FL	(Wales) Richie Pugh	1+4	0	0	0	0	0	1	0	0	0	0	0	0+1	0	0	0	0	0	2+6	0	0	0	0	0	0	0
FL	(Wales) Josh Turnbull	13+2	0	0	0	0	0	0	0	0	0	0	0	6	1	0	0	0	5	18+2	1	0	0	0	5	1	0
FL	(Wales) Duane Eager	0	0	0	0	0	0	0+1	0	0	0	0	0	0	0	0	0	0	0	0+1	0	0	0	0	0	0	0
FL/N8	(England) Mat Gilbert	0	0	0	0	0	0	0+1	0	0	0	0	0	0	0	0	0	0	0	0+1	0	0	0	0	0	0	0
LK	(Wales) Vernon Cooper	5+1	0	0	0	0	0	1+1	0	0	0	0	0	5	0	0	0	0	0	10+2	0	0	0	0	0	1	0
LK	(Wales) Dominic Day	7+5	0	0	0	0	0	2+1	0	0	0	0	0	2	1	0	0	0	5	10+6	1	0	0	0	5	1	0
LK	(Wales) Lou Reed	19	1	0	0	0	5	0	0	0	0	0	0	4	0	0	0	0	0	23	1	0	0	0	5	2	0
LK/FL	(Wales) Aaron Shingler	5+2	1	0	0	0	5	4	1	0	0	0	5	0	0	0	0	0	0	9+2	2	0	0	0	10	0	0
LK	(England) Damien Welch	5+5	0	0	0	0	0	2+1	0	0	0	0	0	0+2	0	0	0	0	0	7+8	0	0	0	0	0	0	0
LK/FL	(Tonga) Jonny Fa'amatuainu	4+8	1	0	0	0	5	2	3	0	0	0	15	1+4	1	0	0	0	5	7+12	5	0	0	0	25	1	0
LK	(Wales) Nathan White	0	0	0	0	0	0	1	0	0	0	0	0	0	0	0	0	0	0	1	0	0	0	0	0	0	0
LK	(Wales) Adam Powell	0	0	0	0	0	0	1	0	0	0	0	0	0	0	0	0	0	0	1	0	0	0	0	0	0	0
HK	(Wales) Rhys Lawrence	3+2	0	0	0	0	0	1+2	0	0	0	0	0	0	0	0	0	0	0	4+4	0	0	0	0	0	0	0
HK	(Wales) Kirby Myhill	0+1	0	0	0	0	0	0	0	0	0	0	0	0	0	0	0	0	0	0+1	0	0	0	0	0	0	0
HK	(Wales) Ken Owens	5+7	0	0	0	0	0	1+1	0	0	0	0	0	1+3	0	0	0	0	0	7+11	0	0	0	0	0	0	0
HK	(Wales) Emyr Phillips	3+9	0	0	0	0	0	2	1	0	0	0	5	0+3	0	0	0	0	0	5+12	1	0	0	0	5	0	0
HK	(Wales) Matthew Rees	11+2	1	0	0	0	5	0	0	0	0	0	0	5	0	0	0	0	0	16+2	1	0	0	0	5	1	0
HK	(Wales) Craig Hawkins	0	0	0	0	0	0	0+1	0	0	0	0	0	0	0	0	0	0	0	0+1	0	0	0	0	0	0	0
PR	(England) Peter Edwards	1+8	0	0	0	0	0	2	0	0	0	0	0	0	0	0	0	0	0	3+8	0	0	0	0	0	1	0
PR	(Wales) Simon Gardiner	2+9	0	0	0	0	0	0+2	0	0	0	0	0	4	0	0	0	0	0	6+11	0	0	0	0	0	0	0
PR	(Wales) Phil John	4+8	0	0	0	0	0	4	0	0	0	0	0	0+5	0	0	0	0	0	8+13	0	0	0	0	0	0	0
PR	(Wales) Rhodri Jones	1+7	0	0	0	0	0	1+2	0	0	0	0	0	0+5	0	0	0	0	0	2+14	0	0	0	0	0	0	0
PR	(Fiji) Deacon Manu	6+1	0	0	0	0	0	0	0	0	0	0	0	0+2	0	0	0	0	0	6+3	0	0	0	0	0	0	0
PR	(Wales) Iestyn Thomas	18+2	0	0	0	0	0	0	0	0	0	0	0	6	0	0	0	0	0	24+2	0	0	0	0	0	0	0
PR	(Wales) Rhys Thomas	10+3	1	0	0	0	5	2	0	0	0	0	0	2	0	0	0	0	0	14+3	1	0	0	0	5	0	0
PR	(Wales) Dean Howells	0	0	0	0	0	0	0+2	0	0	0	0	0	0	0	0	0	0	0	0+2	0	0	0	0	0	0	0
PR	(Wales) Shaun Hopkins	0	0	0	0	0	0	0+1	0	0	0	0	0	0	0	0	0	0	0	0+1	0	0	0	0	0	0	0
