= Daniel Newton =

Daniel Newton may refer to:

- Dan Newton (born 1989), Welsh rugby union player
- Daniel Newton (cricketer) (born 1990), English cricketer
- Danny Newton (born 1991), English footballer
