= Jordan Williams (rugby union) =

Welsh rugby union player (born 1993)

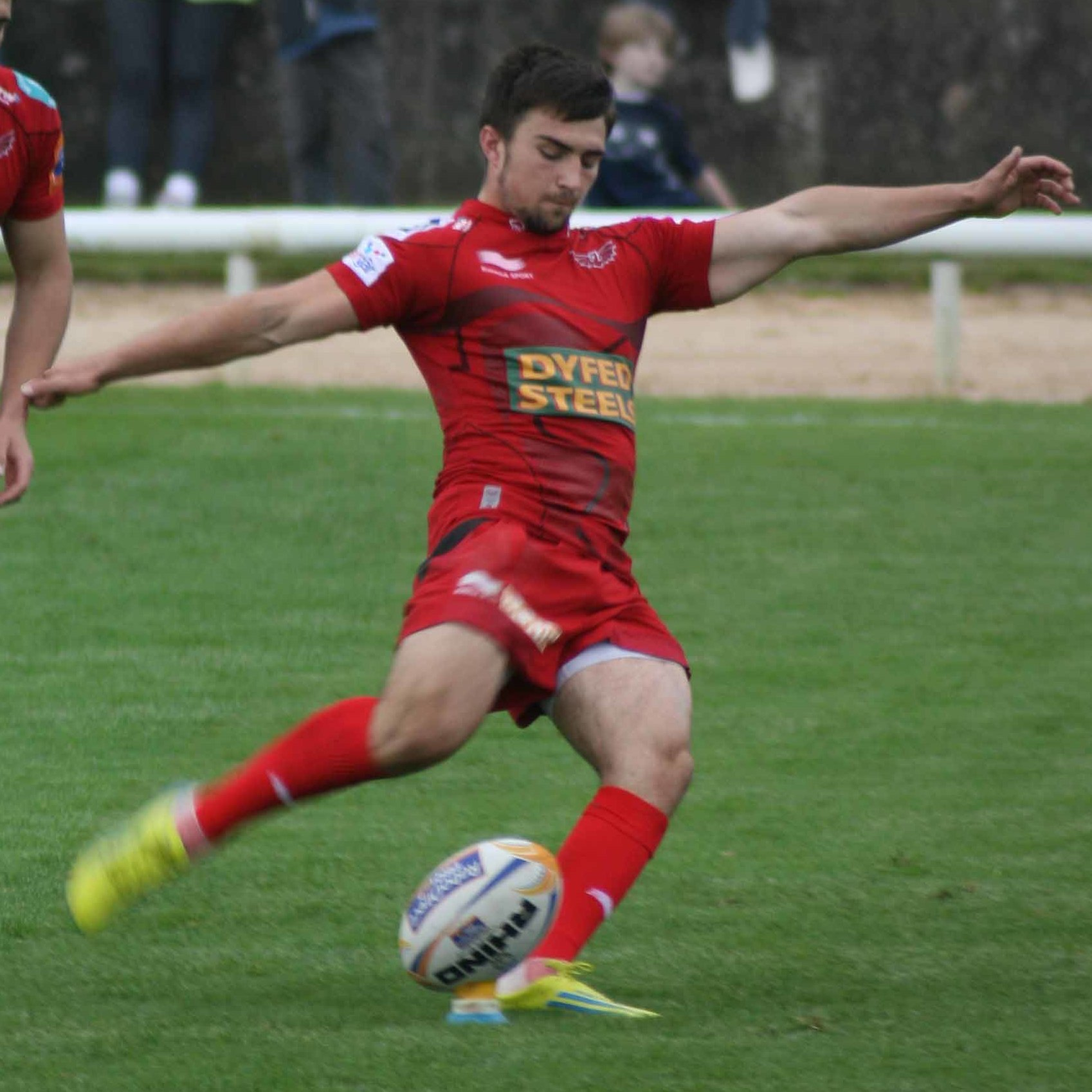
- Williams in 2012
- Born: Jordan Rhys Williams; 20 September 1993 (age 33) Swansea, Wales
- Height: 5 ft 8 in (1.73 m)
- Weight: 12 st 10 lb (81 kg)
- School: Coedcae School

Rugby union career
- Position(s): Full-back; Wing; Fly-half
- Current team: Dragons
Senior career
Years	Team	Apps	(Points)
2010–2016	Llanelli RFC	53	(562)
2010–2016	Scarlets	55	(81)
2016–2018	Bristol	35	(87)
2018–2025	Dragons RFC	76	(103)
2025-	New Dock Stars		
- Correct as of 6 February 2024
International career
Years	Team	Apps	(Points)
2010–2011	Wales U18		
2012–2013	Wales U20	10	
- Correct as of 12 May 2016
National sevens team
Years	Team		Comps
2015	Wales		

Jordan Rhys Williams (born 20 September 1993) is a Welsh rugby union footballer who plays for the Dock Stars. His regular position is at full-back, but he has also played at fly-half and on the wing. He began his career with amateur side New Dock Stars RFC, before being signed by Llanelli RFC and ultimately breaking into the Scarlets regional side. However, he struggled to find playing time with the Scarlets and moved to Bristol in 2016, only to return to Wales with the Dragons two years later. He has also played internationally for Wales at under-16, under-18 and under-20 level, as well as for the Wales Sevens team.

== Career ==
=== Llanelli RFC ===
Born at Singleton Hospital, Swansea, Williams is the son of former Llanelli RFC lock Lee Williams. He grew up in Llanelli and attended the local Coedcae School with Scarlets team-mate Samson Lee, and began his rugby career with New Dock Stars RFC, a former club of veteran Scarlets prop Phil John. Williams joined the Scarlets academy at the age of 15 and made his first appearance for Llanelli RFC as a replacement in a 32–16 win over Cardiff RFC on 4 December 2010. At the end of January 2011, he made his first appearance for the Scarlets, coming on as a replacement for Steven Shingler for the final seven minutes of a 34–7 Anglo-Welsh Cup defeat to Saracens. He started his first game two weeks later, playing at fly-half for Llanelli and scoring five points (one conversion and one penalty) in a 59–15 defeat to Aberavon.

Over the course of the following 2011–12 season, Williams gradually made the transition to full-back as he played 24 times for Llanelli. As the team's regular kicker, he amassed 337 points, including 12 tries. For his performances in November 2011, he was named as the Principality Premiership Player of the Month, but his stand-out performance came in April 2012 in a 55–8 win over Newport RFC, in which he scored four tries on the way to a total of 35 points. Williams contributed 25 points as Llanelli beat Aberavon 40–26 in the play-off semi-final at the end of the season, and also scored eight points in the final against Pontypridd, although Ponty won the match 15–13. For his performances throughout the season, Williams was named the Premiership's Best Newcomer in the end of season awards. Those performances also saw Williams make his second appearance for the Scarlets in October 2011, against Leicester Tigers in the Anglo-Welsh Cup; after coming on for starting fly-half Aled Thomas in the 53rd minute, Williams scored a last-minute solo try, which he also converted to seal a 31–3 victory.

=== Scarlets ===
After being awarded with a development contract for the 2012–13 season, Williams made his first league start for the Scarlets as a full-back away to Connacht on 15 September 2012, scoring two tries and a conversion on the way to a 24–11 victory and the man of the match award. After missing the team's next game against the Ospreys, he returned to the side for a 22–20 defeat away to Benetton Treviso; Williams was at fault for Treviso's third try of the game, as his kick was charged down and run in by Robert Barbieri. That was his last appearance for the Scarlets for almost a year. Things got worse for Williams in October 2012, when he suffered a dislocated shoulder while playing for Llanelli in a 38–28 victory over Gala RFC in the British and Irish Cup, which kept him out for four months. After his recovery, he returned to the fly-half position for all eight of Llanelli's remaining Premiership games for which he was available, including the 47–15 loss to Pontypridd in the play-off final.

With the departures of wingers George North and Andy Fenby from the Scarlets after the 2012–13 season, Williams found himself back in the Scarlets team for 2013–14, albeit out of position. After being named on the bench for the first game of the season against Leinster, Williams started seven of the next eight games on the left wing, followed by one on the right, scoring tries in the league against Edinburgh and in the Heineken Cup against Harlequins, sandwiching a penalty against Glasgow Warriors. As he had been included in the Wales squad for the 2013 Autumn internationals, he missed the next two games for the Scarlets, but returned to the side as a replacement for the return fixture against Leinster on 30 November, before starting both matches against Clermont in the Heineken Cup; he kicked a penalty in the away fixture, but also missed a conversion. After missing the last two matches of the year against Munster and the Ospreys, Williams was a replacement for the Scarlets' first two games of 2014 (going unused in the Heineken Cup against Racing Métro), before starting each of the remaining games of the season, either on the left wing or at full-back. In February 2014, he scored three tries in two games, starting with the final score in a 41–33 win over Benetton, before scoring twice in a 25–21 win at home to Edinburgh. He scored twice more in the final four games of the season, first in the 27–20 home win over Zebre on 12 April, and then in the 34–23 bonus-point win at home to the Dragons that secured the Scarlets' place in the 2014–15 European Rugby Champions Cup.

Despite being picked by the BBC's Sean Holley and Jonathan Davies as a player to watch in 2014–15, Williams began the season down the pecking order among the Scarlets' back three options, starting just one of the team's opening nine matches of the season, albeit being named on the bench for their first two Champions Cup games. He suffered a concussion that kept him out of the game against Zebre on 1 November, but returned to the starting line-up for the Scarlets' two Anglo-Welsh Cup matches that month, before dropping to the bench for the Pro12 game against Glasgow on 21 November, and only after Regan King had been injured in the pre-match warm-up. He was on the bench again for the first two games of 2015, and was forced into an extended cameo in the second match against Glasgow after Liam Williams suffered a shoulder injury early in the second half, and started in place of Williams in the next match away to Leicester Tigers in the Champions Cup the following week. Full-back duties were assigned to Steven Shingler, Josh Lewis and Kristian Phillips for the next three games, but Williams started the next five during the 2015 Six Nations Championship, scoring a try in the first of those in a 32–14 home win over Connacht on 15 February after making an interception on his own goal line, and another in a 23–13 win at home to Leinster on 7 March. A shoulder injury that required surgery brought an early end to Williams' season. During the season, Williams also played three times for Carmarthen Quins in the British and Irish Cup, scoring one try against Jersey Reds.

In 2015–16, Williams played just twice for the Scarlets: in a 20–8 away win over Zebre on 4 October, and in a 31–15 away loss to Munster on the final day of the season. He was far more active for Llanelli, playing nine times in the Welsh Premiership at wing, full-back and fly-half, and scoring seven tries and six conversions. On 5 April 2016, it was announced that Williams had agreed a two-year contract with newly promoted Premiership Rugby side Bristol Rugby ahead of the 2016–17 season.

=== Bristol ===
Williams made his debut for Bristol in a 70–22 loss to Wasps in the third week of the 2016–17 Premiership Rugby season. He scored his first try for the club the following week, in a 41–17 home defeat to Exeter Chiefs; he also provided the conversion for Max Crumpton's late try. He played six more times for Bristol in the league that season (five starts), as well as twice in the 2016–17 European Rugby Challenge Cup, although his only further points came in the form of two tries against Cardiff Blues in the Challenge Cup. Bristol finished bottom of the Premiership and were relegated to the Championship again; however, Williams' team-leading 14 tries in 19 appearances helped Bristol to win 21 of their 22 matches in 2017–18, as they won the Championship title by 20 clear points over Ealing Trailfinders.

=== Dragons ===
Despite finding success in the RFU Championship, in November 2017, Williams agreed to return to Wales with the Dragons for the 2018–19 season after the expiry of his contract with Bristol in order to make himself eligible to play for Wales again. He was ever-present for the Dragons during the 2018–19 season, playing 26 times and scoring four tries, a conversion and two penalties. He made his debut on 1 September 2018, in a 21–17 home defeat to Benetton Treviso, and scored his first try two weeks later, a 60-metre solo score in a 52–10 away defeat to Leinster. His kicking abilities were in evidence the following week, when he landed a long-range effort in a 16–5 home win over Zebre, followed by another penalty and a conversion, as well as setting up the opening try for Josh Lewis, in a 23–15 home loss to the Cardiff Blues. Despite continuing to provide opportunities for his teammates, his next score did not come for another 12 matches, as he scored the seventh of the Dragons' nine tries in a 59–3 win at home to Timișoara Saracens in the European Challenge Cup on 11 January 2019. He scored again after coming off the bench in the team's very next match, at home to Clermont, but it proved to be only a consolation try, as the French side won 49–7 to eliminate the Dragons from the Challenge Cup. His final score of the season came on 4 April, when he came off the bench to help the Dragons come from behind to salvage an 18–18 draw away to the Southern Kings.

In 2019–20, Williams scored twice in his first six appearances of the season, first against Zebre in the Dragons' first away win for more than four years, then against Leinster, before missing a game for the first time since joining the Dragons, in their opening Challenge Cup game of the season against Castres. He returned to the side for the Challenge Cup game against Enisei-STM, and scored the opening try inside 10 minutes after running from deep within his own half; however, he suffered an injury before the end of the first half and had to be substituted. It later turned out that he had injured his anterior cruciate ligament and had to undergo surgery that ruled him out for the next few months. Despite the injury, in February 2020, he signed a new "long-term" contract with the Dragons. Following the suspension and subsequent resumption of professional rugby union due to the COVID-19 pandemic, Williams eventually made his comeback in the Dragons' European Challenge Cup quarter-final match against Bristol on 18 September 2020, almost 10 months after his injury, though he was unable to prevent his former side from winning comfortably, 56–17.

Williams missed the first game of the 2020–21 season against Leinster, but returned for the Dragons' 26–18 win at home to Zebre on 9 October, in which he scored two tries and set up Jamie Roberts for another. He was not selected for the Dragons' next 10 matches, but returned again in February 2021 to start seven of the next nine, beginning with a home defeat to Connacht. He scored two more tries in that time, against Glasgow on 21 March, and against the Scarlets on 25 April.

== International ==
After playing for Wales at both under-16 and under-18 level, Williams received his first call-up to the Wales under-20 team for the 2012 Six Nations Under 20s Championship. After being named as an unused replacement for the 28–15 home win over Scotland, he came off the bench in the 68th minute of the 40–9 away loss to England two weeks later. He then started the following match against Italy and kicked two conversions as Wales won 30–23, before again being an unused replacement for the final match against France, which France won 36–16. The following season, Williams was still suffering from a shoulder injury at the start of the 2013 Six Nations Under 20s Championship, but joined up with the squad once he had recovered. He missed Wales' 17–15 win over Ireland in the opening match, but was fit enough to make an appearance off the bench in the second game, a 27–13 away win over France, before returning to the starting line-up at full-back for the final three matches. Victories over Italy and Scotland meant the final match at home to England served as a title decider, with Wales playing for a Grand Slam; however, England won 28–15 to take the title on points difference.

At the end of the 2012–13 season, Williams was named in the Wales squad for the 2013 IRB Junior World Championship. He was left out of the opening match, a 42–3 win over Samoa, before starting at full-back in the 26–21 win over Scotland four days later. He was named on the bench for the final pool match against Argentina, and came on for Hallam Amos in the 59th minute as Wales won 25–20 to top the group and qualify for the semi-finals. Williams again started at full-back in the semi-final against defending champions South Africa, and played a part in both of Wales' tries; for the first, a deft pass allowed captain Ellis Jenkins to crash over and give Wales an 11–7 lead. South Africa replied almost immediately, and had a six-point lead going into the final minute, when Williams broke four tackles to put Wales in good field position for Sam Davies to set up a try for wing Ashley Evans, which Davies then converted to give Wales an 18–17 win. Williams was again picked at full-back for the final against England on 23 June, but England won the match and the title.

Williams received his first call-up to the Wales senior team for the match against Tonga during the 2013 Autumn internationals. He was named on the bench for the game, but did not make an appearance. In 2014, following an extended run in the Scarlets team at both wing and full-back to end the season, Williams was named in the Possibles squad for a Probables vs Possibles match ahead of Wales' summer tour to South Africa, although the unavailability of some players meant he was picked on the wing for the Probables team for the match itself. Williams scored two tries as the Probables won 55–7, and was selected as one of three wings for the tour. Former Wales captain Martyn Williams said Williams provided "[an option] off the bench we haven't had in the past". Williams started the warm-up match against Eastern Province Kings, playing the full 80 minutes of the 34–12 win, but was not selected in the matchday squad for either test match. In 2015, Williams was selected in the Wales Sevens squad for the first two legs of the 2015–16 World Rugby Sevens Series in Dubai and Cape Town.
