= Ysgol Dyffryn Taf School =

Coordinates: 51.82202°N 4.61651°W

Ysgol Dyffryn Taf

Location
- North Road, Whitland; Carmarthenshire, SA34 0BD

Information
- Other name: Dyffryn Taf Comprehensive School
- Former name: Whitland Grammar School
- School type: State Comprehensive
- Motto: I fyny fo’r nod
- Established: 1896
- Head teacher: Alun Owen
- Staff: 88
- Enrollment: 922
- Language: English, Welsh

Dyffryn Taf is a Comprehensive School with both English and Welsh classes in Whitland, Carmarthenshire, Wales, United Kingdom.

== History ==
Dyffryn Taf was founded in 1896 as a small grammar school, Whitland Grammar School. It changed to a comprehensive school in 1989 and has expanded since then into a large school of approximately 900 pupils today. Nearly 20% of pupils are fluent in Welsh and bilingual education is provided to one form per year group.

As of 2007, the latest additions to the school buildings have been a new maths block and an extended gym. A £1.5 million sports hall was added and is used by the school and in the evenings by other groups. 2010 saw a new re-furbished canteen and a new "sweat shop" style gym, full of new equipment. The gym at Dyffryn Taf was used as an example of good practice within a report by the APPG on a fit and healthy childhood. The PE Department won the Pearson Teaching Awards 'Outstanding Team of the Year' in 2011. The school has a number of Welsh International rugby players among its alumni.

== Motto ==
The school has a motto: "I fyny fo’r nod", which is Welsh for "Aim for the highest". The school has a more recent mission statement: ‘We can, we care’ (‘Gallwn, Gofalwn’).

== Uniform ==
Year 7 to Year 11 wear a light blue shirt or blouse, a navy striped school tie, dark/charcoal grey trousers and a navy V-neck jumper with the school logo. Sixth form wear a polo shirt with the school logo, shirt or blouse, black skirt or trousers, sixth form tie and a black V-neck jumper. All pupils wear black shoes and navy/black socks. In the summer term, Years 7-11 have the option to wear a navy polo shirt with the school logo in place of the usual shirt/blouse and tie.

== Curriculum ==
=== Key Stage 3 ===
All pupils study the core subjects of English, Mathematics, Science, and Welsh, and the following foundation subjects: Art, Design Technology, Drama, French, Geography, History, Information Technology, Music, Physical Education, Religious Studies and Personal and Social Education. Pupils in the Welsh-medium classes study Welsh First Language, Geography, History, Religious Studies and PSE through the medium of Welsh.

=== Key Stage 4 ===
All pupils study the core subjects of English, Mathematics, Science, Welsh and Welsh Baccalaureate. Pupils can choose three from the foundation subjects studied at KS3, including some vocational subjects such as BTEC in Health and Social Care, Hospitality and Sport. Some classes are offered through the medium of Welsh at GCSE.

=== Key Stage 5 ===
All pupils study the Welsh Baccalaureate Qualification. Subject choices for A-Level include: Art, Biology, BTEC Applied Science, BTEC Health and Social Care, BTEC Hospitality, BTEC Sport, Chemistry, Computer Science, Design Technology, Drama, English Literature, French, Geography, History, Mathematics, Music, Physical Education, Physics, Religious Studies and Welsh Second Language.

== Extracurricular activities ==
The school has had a very successful Team Dragon Young Engineers Club which has won prizes throughout the years. There have been clubs such as Eco Committee and Debating, with teams regularly competing in local Rotary Club Youth Speaks competitions. Maths teams have reached the National Finals of the UKMT Team Maths Challenge at Junior and Senior levels. Mandarin lessons have been made available via the Confucius Institute.

The school competes in a number of different sports including rugby, football, netball and hockey. There is an established House System where pupils also play sports within their houses in competitions throughout the year. The 5X60 club runs various activities from street dance to dodgeball.

The school orchestra and choir rehearse weekly and peripatetic music lessons are offered to pupils. The school puts on an annual musical production at the beginning of December which is a big success in the local community. Previous shows have included The Sound of Music, Les Misérables, Hairspray and Grease.

The Charity Committee run by Sixth Form pupils raises money for a variety of charitable causes.

A successful peer mentoring scheme sees Year 10 pupils support incoming Year 7 classes.

The Duke of Edinburgh Award is a large part of school life, with pupils taking part in all levels of the award.

== Alumni ==
James Davies (Welsh International rugby player)

Jonathan Davies (Welsh International rugby player)

Lorys Davies (Archdeacon of Bolton)

Josh Helps (rugby union player)

Gemma Lavender (astronomer, author and journalist)

Jodie Marie (singer songwriter)

Dan Newton (rugby union player)

Michael Phillips (Welsh International rugby player)

Heather Phillipson (artist)
