= Mike Poole =

Welsh rugby player (born 1986)

Michael Poole
- Born: April 23, 1986 (age 40) Cardiff, Wales
- Height: 188 cm (6 ft 2 in)
- Weight: 85 kg (13 st 5 lb)

Rugby union career
- Position: Wing
Senior career
Years	Team	Apps	(Points)
2004–2006	Pontypool RFC		
2006–13	Newport RFC	105	(240)
2012	Bedwas RFC	1	(0)
2013	Llanelli RFC	2	(10)
- Correct as of 16 March 2016
Provincial / State sides
Years	Team	Apps	(Points)
2011-13	NG Dragons	13	(5)
2013	Scarlets	1	(0)

Michael Poole (born April 23, 1986, in Cardiff, Wales) is a rugby union player. He previously played for Newport Youth, Pontypool RFC Newport RFC and Newport Gwent Dragons. During the 2008–09 season Poole was the Principality Premiership top try scorer with 19 tries for Newport, more than double the amount that he had scored throughout his career at the club.

In October 2013 he joined the Scarlets.

His hobbies include cage fighting.

== Newport RFC Record ==
Season	Games	Tries	Conversions	Penalties	Drop goals	Total points
2006–07	26	5	0	0	0	25
2007–08	23	4	0	0	0	20
2008–09	27	19	0	0	0	95
2009–10	22	16	0	0	0	80
TOTAL	98	44	0	0	0	220
