= Rhodri Gomer-Davies =

Welsh rugby player

Rhodri Gomer Davies
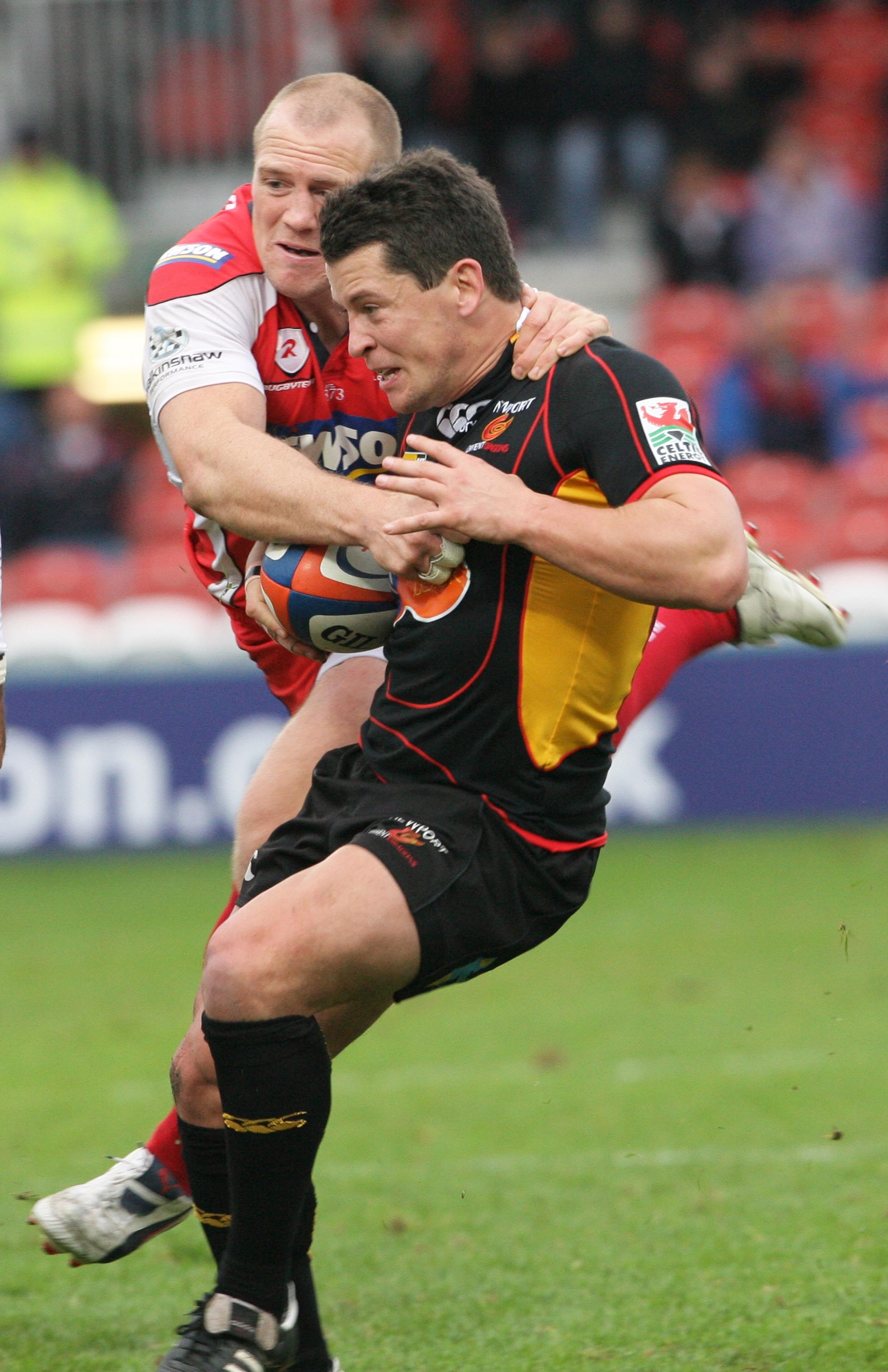
- Born: Rhodri Gomer-Davies; 11 January 1983 (age 43) Carmarthen, Wales
- Height: 178 cm (5 ft 10 in)
- Weight: 92 kg (14 st 7 lb)
- School: Lampeter Comprehensive School, Llandovery College, Auckland Grammar School
- University: Lougborough University

Rugby union career
- Position: Centre
Senior career
| Years | Team | Apps | (Points) |
| 2000-05 | Llandovery RFC | | |
| 2003-07 | Northampton Saints | | |
- Correct as of 15 March 2016
Provincial / State sides
| Years | Team | Apps | (Points) |
| 2007-11 | Newport Gwent Dragons | | |
| 2011-12 | Scarlets | | |
- Correct as of 15 March 2016
International career
| Years | Team | Apps | (Points) |
- Wales U18
| – | Wales U19 | | |
| – | Wales U21 | | |
- Correct as of 15 March 2016
National sevens team
| Years | Team | | Comps |
| 2010–12 | Wales | | |

Rhodri Gomer Davies (born 11 January 1983) is a former rugby union player who played as a centre.

== Professional career ==
Rhodri signed for Northampton Saints in 2003, combining his rugby career with his studies at Loughborough University. His relationship with the club came to an end in January 2007. Following intensive rehab and several operations to a groin injury first sustained in December 2005, his contract was terminated early. Gomer-Davies moved to the Newport Gwent Dragons for the start of the 2007–08 Celtic League season, and spent four seasons at the region. He then signed for the Wales National 7s team in March 2011 on a dual contract with the Scarlets. An injury to his left knee at the beginning of the 2011/12 season was deemed too serious to return to play and his last game was for the Scarlets in an LV Cup game against Leicester Tigers on 15 October 2011.

== Television ==
During his rugby career and upon retiring, he has worked as a pundit, commentator, reporter and presenter for Pro12 and European games.

In 2013 he became a roaming sports reporter for Welsh language magazine show Heno, producing and reporting on sports events and stories all over Wales.

Upon S4C gaining rights to the prestigious Tour de France coverage in 2014, Rhodri became presenter of the 'Seiclo' series, presenting live outside broadcasts on location all over France. 2019 will be his sixth time presenting the World famous stage race.

As a producer, he has been credited with three sports documentaries on S4C. The first 'Medal Aur Owain Doull’ portrayed Olympic gold medal cyclist Owain Doull’s memorable 2016; the second, 'Mr Marathon: Josh Griffiths’ focused on amateur marathon runner Josh Griffiths' incredible World Championships qualifying run at the 2017 London Marathon; and Geraint Thomas: 'Vive Le Tour', the story of Thomas's yellow jersey ride at the 2018 Tour de France, told by the Welshman himself.

== Personal life ==
Born at Glangwili General Hospital, Carmarthen, Rhodri was raised on the family farm just outside Ffarmers in the Elenydd Mountains. Having attended the village primary school, he studied at Lampeter Comprehensive School, before gaining a 6th form Carwyn James scholarship to Llandovery College in 1999. Following a gap year working at Auckland Grammar School, he then won a sports scholarship to Loughborough University in 2002, where he was quickly signed to the Northampton Saints academy.

== Charity work ==
Following a voluntary trip in 2009 to Spring Valley primary school, Nairobi, Rhodri went about organising a charity bike ride around Wales. Over four years, the total raised for various charities was in excess of £100,000.

Gomer-Davies married his Primary school teacher fiancé Carys in autumn 2011 at Bethlehem Chapel, Gwaelod-y-Garth. The couple have now settled in west Wales with their three children.
