= Rhys M. Thomas =

Wales international rugby union player (born 1982)

Rhys Thomas
- Born: Rhys Muir Thomas; 31 July 1982 (age 44) Johannesburg, South Africa
- Height: 6 ft 1 in (1.85 m )
- Weight: 19 st 12 lb (126 kg)

Rugby union career
- Position: Prop
Senior career
Years	Team	Apps	(Points)
2002–2004	Newport RFC	21	(20)
- Correct as of 01:51, 4 November 2007 (UTC)
Provincial / State sides
Years	Team	Apps	(Points)
2003–2009	Newport Gwent Dragons	126	(60)
2009–12	Scarlets	24	(20)
- Correct as of 12:59, 16 April 2009 (UTC)
International career
Years	Team	Apps	(Points)
2006–09	Wales	7	(0)
- Correct as of 01:51, 4 November 2007 (UTC)

Rhys Muir Thomas (born 31 July 1982) is a former Wales international rugby union prop forward.

== Career ==
=== Club career ===
Thomas attended King Edward VII School in Houghton, Johannesburg, South Africa alongside Joe van Niekerk and Bryan Habana. Despite being born and raised in South Africa, Thomas began his professional rugby career in his father's birthplace, Newport, South Wales, playing for the Newport RFC youth team. Thomas progressed through the ranks at Newport RFC, eventually making his senior debut in 2003. He made six appearances for Newport in the 2002–03 season, and was rewarded with a development contract with the Newport Gwent Dragons regional side. Thomas made a try-scoring debut for the Dragons in October 2003 against the Glasgow Warriors, but divided his 2003–04 season between Newport RFC and the Dragons, making 15 appearances for Newport and 16 for the Dragons.

The 2004–05 season saw Thomas establish himself as a regular in the Dragons squad, making 27 appearances and scoring two tries, as the team finished in 4th place in the Celtic League. Thomas made a further 30 appearances in 2005–06, but he was unable to prevent the team from slipping to 8th place in the Celtic League, forcing them to have to play a play-off match against Rugby Parma to determine qualification for the 2006-07 Heineken Cup.

Thomas was involved in the play-off, but could not prevent the 24–15 loss that condemned the Dragons to playing in the European Challenge Cup in 2006–07. The team went all the way to the semi-finals of the Challenge Cup, before losing 46–29 to eventual champions ASM Clermont Auvergne. Thomas had missed most of the season due to a back injury but was available for the Challenge Cup semi-final and the final three games of the Celtic League. Thomas was ever-present for the Dragons in the 2007–08 season scored three tries – a personal record for one season – including two in one match against Newcastle Falcons on 3 October 2007, the first time he had scored more than one try in a game for the Dragons.

In May 2009 Thomas joined the Scarlets.

=== International career ===
Thomas made appearances at three different levels for Wales, beginning at Under-19 level while still playing for Newport RFC Youth. Following his displays for Newport RFC, Thomas was included in the Wales Under-21 side and played a big part in Wales winning the U-21 six nations in his final year of U21s. He was also selected for the world cup dream team as best tight head, the only Northern Hemisphere player to be selected in that team.

In 2006, Thomas made his debut for the Wales national rugby union team, coming on as a replacement for Adam Jones in the 57th minute of a match against Argentina on 17 June 2006. Due to Injury it was to be 14 months before Thomas made another appearance for the national team, again as a substitute, but this time in a 62–5 defeat by England. During the 2007–2008 season he made a further 3 appearances for Wales, starting as a prop in the autumn international against South Africa on 24 November 2007, against Italy in the 6 Nations on 23 February 2008 and against South Africa at the Loftus Versfeld Stadium on 14 June 2008.

=== Retirement ===
In April 2012 Thomas retired from rugby following a heart attack during training and subsequent emergency operation.

== Personal life ==
Thomas has four children. He was fitted with a left ventricular assist device by 2014 and returned to South Africa in 2024, where he received a heart transplant in 2026.
