= Craig Hawkins =

Welsh rugby union player

- Born: 4 January 1979 (age 47)
- Height: 1.73 m (5 ft 8 in)
- Weight: 93 kg (14 st 9 lb)

Rugby union career
- Position: Hooker
Senior career
Years	Team	Apps	(Points)
2004–2013	Scarlets		

Craig Hawkins is a Welsh rugby union player. He played for Pro14 team Scarlets before leaving in 2013. He most recently played for Llanelli RFC. His usual position is hooker.
