= Mat Gilbert =

English rugby union player

- Born: 10 September 1985 (age 41) Sidcup, England
- Height: 190 cm (6 ft 3 in)
- Weight: 119 kg (262 lb)

Rugby union career
- Position(s): Number Eight, Flanker
- Current team: Cinderford
Senior career
Years	Team	Apps	(Points)
2010–2012	Llanelli RFC	51	(75)
2012	Mogliano Rugby	2	(0)
2012–2014	Bath Rugby	19	(15)
2014–16	Worcester Warriors	12	(5)
2017–2020	Hartpury University	27	(15)
2019–	Cinderford		
Provincial / State sides
Years	Team	Apps	(Points)
2010–2012	Scarlets	15	(15)

Matthew Ian Gilbert (born 10 September 1985) is an English rugby union footballer currently playing at Flanker and number eight for Cinderford. He previously played for Hartpury University, Bath and Worcester Warriors. As well as Llanelli Scarlets in the Pro 14 and European Cup.

He is the only deaf professional sportsman in England. Gilbert has worn hearing aids since he was a child. He works as an ambassador for Phonak and the charity Action on Hearing Loss.

He has played 11 times for the England Deaf rugby team.
