= Dale Ford (rugby union) =

Welsh rugby union player

- Born: Dale Ford; 16 December 1991 (age 34) Swansea, Wales
- Height: 178 cm (5 ft 10 in)
- Weight: 85 kg (13 st 5 lb)

Rugby union career
- Position(s): Full-back; Wing
- Current team: Carmarthen Quins
Senior career
Years	Team	Apps	(Points)
2008-2013	Llanelli	62	(142)
2013-2015	Neath	23	(50)
2015-	Carmarthen Quins	11	(10)
- Correct as of 10 December 2015
Provincial / State sides
Years	Team	Apps	(Points)
2009–2013	Scarlets	9	(3)
- Correct as of 10 December 2015
International career
Years	Team	Apps	(Points)
- Wales U18
2011	Wales U20	3	(5)
- Correct as of 10 December 2015

Dale Ford (born 16 December 1991) is a Welsh rugby union player. A winger, he plays club rugby for the Welsh team the Carmarthen Quins having previously played for Llaneli and Neath.
