= Josh Turnbull =

Wales international rugby union footballer

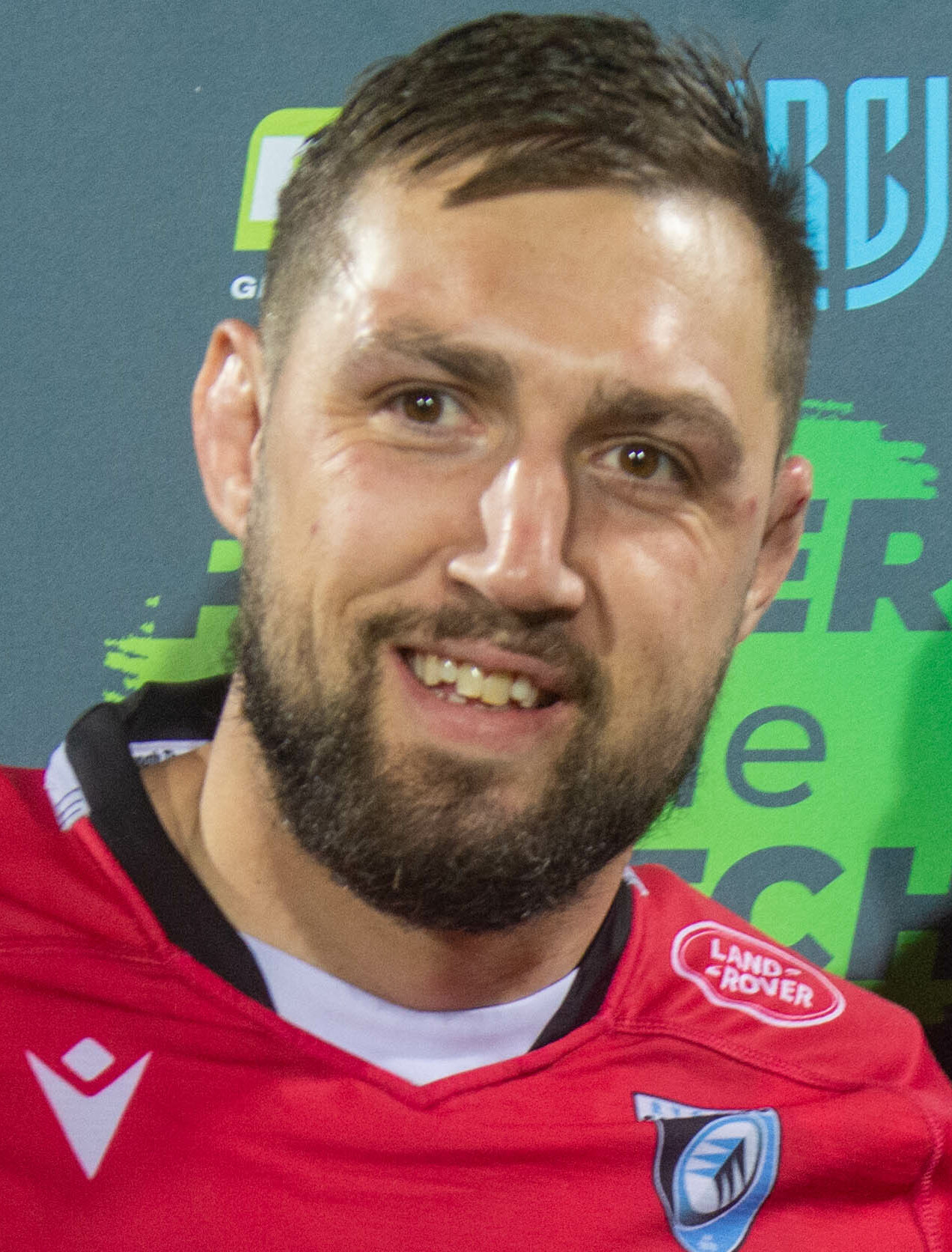
- Turnbull at 2022–23 United Rugby Championship
- Born: Joshua Turnbull; 12 March 1988 (age 38) Haverfordwest, Wales
- Height: 1.95 m (6 ft 5 in)
- Weight: 117 kg (258 lb; 18.4 st)
- School: Ysgol Gyfun Emlyn

Rugby union career
- Position(s): Blindside flanker Lock; Number 8
Amateur team(s)
Years	Team	Apps	(Points)
- Newcastle Emlyn
Senior career
Years	Team	Apps	(Points)
2006	Carmarthen Quins	6	(0)
2006–2009	Llanelli	23	(5)
2007–2014	Scarlets	129	(25)
2009–2010	Llandovery	12	(15)
2014–2024	Cardiff Rugby	200	(85)
International career
Years	Team	Apps	(Points)
2005–2006	Wales U18	7	
2006–2008	Wales U19	17	(10)
2008–2009	Wales U20	10	(10)
2011–2021	Wales	13	(0)
National sevens team
Years	Team		Comps
2009–2010	Wales 7s		

Joshua Turnbull (born 12 March 1988) is a Welsh former professional rugby union player, who played in the back row and second row. He played for the Scarlets and Cardiff Rugby in the United Rugby Championship, and at club level for Carmarthen Quins, Llanelli and Llandovery. He played internationally for Wales at under-16, under-18, under-19 and under-20 levels, Wales 7s and earned 13 caps for the senior team between 2011 and 2022. Born in Haverfordwest, he is a fluent Welsh speaker.

== Club career ==
Turnbull began his professional career in the Scarlets academy. He made his senior debut for their feeder club, Carmarthen Quins, in September 2006, playing on the blindside flank in a 26–5 away win over Bonymaen before appearing at number 8 in a 31–15 away win over Waunarlwydd a month later. In March 2007, he made two substitute appearances for Llanelli RFC in the Welsh Premiership, in a 21–16 away defeat to Bedwas and a 17–11 loss at Pontypridd.

He made his Scarlets debut in a friendly against Exeter Chiefs ahead of the 2007–08 season. He became a regular for Llanelli during the season, but missed three months of the season to take part in the 2008 Six Nations Under 20s Championship. After signing a three-year professional contract with the region in April 2008, he made his competitive debut for the Scarlets that September, starting on the blindside flank in a 32–12 away defeat to Edinburgh, although he was replaced by Nathan Thomas at half-time. He made 14 more appearances for the Scarlets that season, as well as 9 for Llanelli. The 2009–10 season began with Turnbull predominantly playing for Llandovery, mostly at number 8, but by the second half of the season, following a five-week suspension for a reckless tackle on Edinburgh's Nick De Luca in December 2009, he was a regular for the Scarlets, owing to a succession of injuries to veteran flanker Simon Easterby. He scored his first senior try in a 58–10 home win over Connacht on 25 April 2010.

In June 2014, Turnbull joined Cardiff from the Scarlets. He made 129 appearances for the Scarlets over a seven-year period.

Ahead of the 2021–22 United Rugby Championship season, Turnbull was named as captain, taking over from Ellis Jenkins.

Turnbull retired from rugby in April 2024, having made 200 appearances for Cardiff Rugby.

== International career ==
Turnbull represented Wales at U18, U19, and U20 levels, winning the Grand Slam in the Under-19 Six Nations in 2006. Turnbull has participated in two IRB U19 World Championships in 2006 and 2007. He was in the Wales U20 squad for the 2008 Under-20 Six Nations and Junior World Championship.

Turnbull received his first call-up to the Wales senior team in 2009, being named in a 32-man squad for the tour to North America in May and June that year. However, he did not play in either match on the tour. In April 2010, he was named as one of 50 players being considered by Wales coach Warren Gatland for his squad for the 2011 Rugby World Cup.

In January 2011, Turnbull was named in the Wales squad for the 2011 Six Nations Championship. He made his international debut in the second game against Scotland on 12 February 2011, coming on as a second-half replacement in a 24–6 win. He was again named on the bench for the third match against Italy, but did not make an appearance. He was named in the preliminary squad for the 2011 Rugby World Cup, and played in the warm-up match against England, coming on for the last 20 minutes of a 19–9 win, but was left out of the final squad.

Turnbull made his first start for Wales on 2 June 2012, in a capped friendly against the Barbarians. He featured intermittently for Wales for the next few seasons, playing in both tests against South Africa on the 2014 Wales rugby union tour of South Africa, including a start in the second test.

Turnbull was selected in the squad for the 2016 Six Nations, but did not earn any further caps during the tournament. He came off the bench in the friendly against England, ahead of the 2016 Wales rugby union tour of New Zealand, and was named in the tour squad, but was not selected in any further matchday squads.

It was not until the 2018 Wales rugby union tour to Argentina and the United States that Turnbull featured for Wales again, earning a call-up after former Scarlets teammate Aaron Shingler was ruled out due to injury. Turnbull came off the bench in both tests, as Wales won the series 2–0.

On the back of an impressive season for Cardiff, Turnbull again earned a recall for the 2021 July rugby union tests, coming off the bench against Canada and Argentina, before starting in the second test against Argentina in his familiar role of blindside flanker.

== Coaching career ==
In 2020, Turnbull started coaching at Carmarthen Quins, initially as forwards coach, before moving to defence coach in 2022.

He joined the coaching team for Under 20s Wales squad ahead of the Six Nations Under 20s Championship.
