= Craig Price (rugby union) =

Welsh rugby player (born 1989)

- Born: Craig Price; 22 June 1989 (age 37) Neath, Wales
- Height: 193 cm (6 ft 4 in)
- Weight: 109 kg (17 st 2 lb)

Rugby union career
- Position: Flanker
- Current team: Neath RFC
Senior career
Years	Team	Apps	(Points)
2011-2015	Llanelli RFC	63	(45)
2015-	Neath RFC	5	(0)
- Correct as of 11 January 2016
Provincial / State sides
Years	Team	Apps	(Points)
2011–15	Scarlets	23	(5)
- Correct as of 11 January 2016
International career
Years	Team	Apps	(Points)
	Wales 7s	19	
- Correct as of 11 January 2016

Craig Price (born 22 June 1989) is a Welsh rugby union player. A flanker, he plays club rugby for Neath RFC having previously played for Scarlets, Tonmawr RFC and Llanelli RFC.

He was selected in the Wales Sevens squad for 2012-13 and has played in 19 tournaments.
