= Rhodri Williams (rugby union) =

Welsh rugby union player

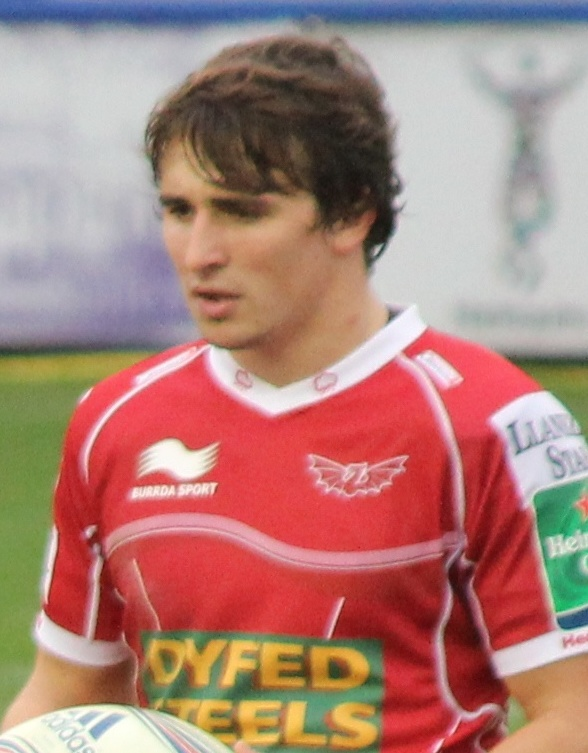
- Born: Rhodri Williams; 5 May 1993 (age 33) Swansea, Wales
- Height: 176 cm (5 ft 9 in)
- Weight: 81 kg (179 lb; 12 st 11 lb)
- School: Amman Valley Comprehensive School

Rugby union career
- Position: Scrum-half
- Current team: Dragons
Senior career
Years	Team	Apps	(Points)
2010–2016	Llandovery RFC	44	(62)
2011–2016	Scarlets	81	(30)
2016–2018	Bristol	35	(65)
2018–	Dragons	149	(132)
- Correct as of 12:11, 6 February 2024 (UTC)
International career
Years	Team	Apps	(Points)
2012–13	Wales U20	13	(15)
2013–	Wales	10	(5)
- Correct as of 1 March 2016

Rhodri Williams (born 5 May 1993) is a Wales international rugby union player. A scrum-half, he plays his club rugby for the Dragons, having previously played for Scarlets and Bristol Bears.

== Club career ==
The son of former Swansea scrum-half Alan Williams, he was involved with the Scarlets set-up since 16, and was picked to join the region’s academy on the back of his U18 performances for both the Scarlets and Wales.

Having trained with the Scarlets’ senior team and playing with Llandovery RFC, Williams was picked to make his senior debut, starting in a pre-season friendly in August 2011 against Rotherham, and his career has since taken off.

During the 2011-12 season, he made a total of 19 appearances. Not only has he featured in several RaboDirect Pro12 games but he’s also had a taste of Heineken Cup action, coming off the bench in the November wins against Castres and Northampton.

Although a popular player at the Scarlets, Williams would struggle for starts ahead of scrum-half rivals Gareth Davies and Aled Davies, both players also being ahead of Williams in the Wales pecking order.

It was announced on 1 February 2016 that Williams had signed for Bristol for the 2016–17 season. Although Bristol were relegated from the English Rugby Premiership at the end of his first season at the club, Williams remained at the club and was a key part of the side's successful campaign to be promoted again in the subsequent season.

In December 2017, however, Williams signed for the Dragons ahead of the upcoming 2018–19 season, specifically citing his desire to push for more Wales honours. Since joining the Dragons, he has been an influential figure, including being named club captain in 2020/2021 and 2021/2022. The West Walian has scored 21 tries in 119 appearances as of November 2024, winning his 100th cap against Munster in November 2023.

== International career ==
Wales 20s

In January 2013, he was selected in the Wales squad for the 2013 Six Nations Under 20s Championship. Later that year was part of the Wales U20 side which reached the 2013 IRB Junior World Championship Final, which the Welsh team lost 15–23 against England.

Wales

On 22 November 2013, he made his full international debut versus Tonga as a second-half replacement and again facing Australia later that month. He was then named in the Wales squad for the 2014 Six Nations Championship and scored his first international try against Scotland in what was his last game for Wales for more than a decade.

Wales 7s

In March 2015 Rhodri was called into the Wales 7s squad to travel to the 2015 Hong Kong Sevens World Series. Playing 5 games and scoring 6 tries. In April 2015 he travelled to Japan Sevens Playing 5 games and scoring 1 try.

In 2016 Rhodri was called up to the Wales 7s squad for the London Sevens playing 6 games and scoring 3 tries which led the squad to win the London Sevens Bowl.

Invitational

On 27 May 2018 he played for the Barbarians against England at Twickenham, the invitational side put nine tries past England in a 63-45 victory. He appeared for the Barbarians again in 2019, coming off the bench to score a try as they lost to England 51–43.

Wales

Williams earned a recall to the national side in June 2021, when he was selected in the squad for the 2021 July rugby union tests. However, he would not appear in the games against Canada and Argentina due to a shoulder injury.

Williams was again called up by Wales in 2022, following injuries in the squad. He was not selected in a match day squad and ultimately did not appear.

Williams earned a recall to the Wales squad for the 2024 end-of-year rugby union internationals. He made his first international appearance in more than ten years on 17 November 2024 against Australia national rugby union team and then his 5th cap against South Africa on 23 November 2024.

2025 Williams featured in all 5 6 nations matches and also part of Wales summer tour squad to Japan.

=== International tries ===
Try	Opponent	Location	Venue	Competition	Date	Result
1	Scotland	Cardiff, Wales	Millennium Stadium	2014 Six Nations	15 March 2014	Win

== Personal life ==
Williams is a fluent Welsh speaker.
