= Peter Edwards (rugby union) =

English rugby union footballer

- Born: Peter Edwards; 12 August 1980 (age 46) Shrewsbury, England
- Height: 178 cm (5 ft 10 in)
- Weight: 117 kg (18 st 6 lb)

Rugby union career
- Position: Tighthead Prop
- Current team: Scarlets
Senior career
| Years | Team | Apps | (Points) |
| 2006–15 | Llanelli RFC | 59 | (0) |
| 2008–13 | Llandovery RFC | 101 | (25) |
| 2013–14 | London Welsh | | |
| 2016–17 | Llandovery RFC | 5 | (0) |
| 2017– | Merthyr RFC | | |
Provincial / State sides
| Years | Team | Apps | (Points) |
| 2010–13, 2014–17 | Scarlets | 90 | (5) |

Peter Edwards (born 12 August 1980) is a rugby union player. A prop forward, he plays club rugby for the Welsh regional team the Scarlets having previously played for Llanelli RFC and Llandovery RFC. After his release from the Scarlets, he joined London Welsh for the 2013–14 season. On 20 May 2014, Edwards re-signed for the Scarlets from the 2014–15 season.
