= Gareth Maule =

Welsh rugby player (born 1987)

- Born: Gareth Maule; 4 December 1987 (age 38) Pontypool, Wales
- Height: 1.91 m (6 ft 3 in)
- Weight: 99 kg (15 st 8 lb)
- University: UWIC

Rugby union career
- Position: Centre
Senior career
Years	Team	Apps	(Points)
2006–07	Ebbw Vale		
2007–09	Newport	10	(0)
2007–09	Cross Keys	19	(30)
2009-10	Llandovery	1	(0)
2011	Llanelli	3	(0)
2014-2016	Bristol Rugby	27	(35)
- Correct as of 6 March 2016
Provincial / State sides
Years	Team	Apps	(Points)
2006–2009	Dragons	19	(15)
2009–2014	Scarlets	115	(65)
International career
Years	Team	Apps	(Points)
2004	Wales U16		
2005	Wales U18		
2006	Wales U19		
2007	Wales U20		

Gareth Maule (born in Pontypool, Wales on 4 December 1987) is a Welsh rugby union player currently playing at Centre. He attended New College School Cardiff and St Albans RC High School.

Maule has been capped for Wales at U16, U18, U19 and U20 over 20 times.

In May 2009, it was announced that Maule had signed for the Scarlets from Newport Gwent Dragons. Maule has previously played for Ebbw Vale RFC, Newport RFC, Cross Keys RFC and Bristol Rugby.
