= Andy Fenby =

Welsh rugby union footballer

- Full name: Andrew Mark Fenby
- Born: 24 October 1985 (age 41) St Asaph, Denbighshire, Wales
- Height: 1.83 m (6 ft 0 in)
- Weight: 92 kg (14 st 7 lb)
- School: Rydal Penrhos
- University: Newcastle University
- Occupation: Chartered Accountant

Rugby union career
- Position(s): Wing; Fullback
Senior career
Years	Team	Apps	(Points)
?–2004	Llandudno	?	(?)
2004–2009	Blaydon	82	(390)
2009	Newcastle Falcons	3	(10)
2009–2012	Llanelli	12	(10)
2009–2013	Scarlets	68	(100)
2011	Carmarthen Quins	1	(5)
2012	Llandovery	1	(0)
2013–2016	London Irish	61	(140)
2016	Saracens	4	(0)
International career
Years	Team	Apps	(Points)
2008	Northumberland	1	(5)
2008	England Counties	1	(10)

Andrew Mark Fenby (born 24 October 1985) is a Welsh former rugby union footballer who played as a fullback or on the wing. Fenby's professional career started relatively late, as he earned his first professional contract with Newcastle Falcons at the age of 24. After a brief cameo for the Falcons at the end of the 2008–09 season, he returned to Wales to sign for the Scarlets. The emergence of fellow wing George North on the international scene gave Fenby the opportunity to play regularly for the Scarlets during the Autumn internationals and the Six Nations, before he finally nailed down the left wing position during the 2012–13 season. A record of 14 tries in 28 appearances that season resulted in a transfer to London Irish in 2013. After initially retiring from professional rugby at the end of the 2015–16 season, he briefly returned to the sport in October 2016, signing a three-month contract with Saracens.

== Early life ==
Born in St Asaph, Denbighshire, Fenby grew up in Rhos-on-Sea, Conwy, and attended Rydal Penrhos in Colwyn Bay between the ages of 11 and 18; while there, he reached the rank of Welsh #2 in Under-19 squash, while also playing for the school's rugby union 1st XV and Llandudno RFC.

Upon leaving school in 2004, Fenby attended Newcastle University to study business, accounting and finance. However, a broken scaphoid bone prevented him from competing in contact sports during his first year in Newcastle, and so committed his sporting time to playing squash, eventually becoming part of the university's elite sports programme.

== Career ==
=== Blaydon ===
During his time at university, Fenby joined Blaydon RFC in 2004, playing in National Division Three North. Initially, he only played for the club's third team, but he gradually progressed up the ranks, eventually making it into the first team scoring an impressive 11 tries from just 13 games during the 2005-06 season. With his try-scoring exploits gaining him a regular place in the first team, Fenby helped Blaydon claim the title the following season and promotion to National Division Two with 25 tries. After a tough first season where Fenby's tries (18 for a struggling team) helped them stay up, Blaydon became a regular fixture in the third tier. Over four seasons with the north-east club, Fenby averaged almost a try a game with 76 in 82 games across all competitions. While at Blaydon, he was also called up to the county team, helping Northumberland to reach the County Championship Shield final against Cornwall in 2008, which Northumberland won 25–11, although he did not actually play in the final at Twickenham.

=== Newcastle Falcons ===
After recording 21 tries in 23 matches for Blaydon during the 2007–08 season, Fenby caught the eye of the England Counties selectors being called up to the end of season tour in which he scored two tries against USA Eagles 'A' in the only game he played on that tour. His try-scoring performances also attracted the attention of Newcastle Falcons scouts. That season, he scored 10 tries in four matches for the Falcons' development side, including six tries against Rotherham and three more against Northampton Wanderers.

These performances earned Fenby a call-up to the bench for the Falcons' senior side against Leeds Carnegie in a pre-season game in August 2008. He did not take to the field, however, and had to wait until 8 March 2009 for his next chance with the first team, being named on the bench for a Guinness Premiership match away to Sale Sharks.

This time, he came off the bench to replace Danny Williams in the 46th minute, and scored a try within four minutes of coming on; Tom May received the ball in the fly-half position and threw a miss-pass to Jamie Noon, who fed Fenby in to step past the last Sale defender and cross for his first senior try. Fenby followed up his debut appearance with a 70-minute cameo against Harlequins the following weekend, before scoring a 77th-minute try in a 36–25 defeat away to Bath on 21 March 2009.

=== Scarlets ===
Following Newcastle's signing of wing Charlie Amesbury, Fenby was deemed surplus to requirements at Kingston Park and he was snapped up by the Scarlets in May 2009. Fenby was forced to miss the Scarlets' first five games of the season with shin splints, but he recovered in time to be named in an initial 25-man squad for the team's first Heineken Cup game of the season against Brive on 10 October. However, he missed out on the final cut for the matchday squad.

With several Scarlets players on international duty in November, Fenby was named in the starting XV for the first time for the Scarlets' Anglo-Welsh Cup match away to Harlequins on 8 November 2009. Five minutes into the second half, Fenby scored a debut try for the second time in his professional career, taking hold of a loose ball before outrunning the Harlequins defence to the try line. Ten minutes later, he was in a one-on-one defensive situation against Harlequins' second-row George Robson, but the forward was more powerful and scored the try to bring the scores level at 15–15. There were no further points scored in the game, but with the other three Pool 2 teams losing their matches, the Scarlets went top of the pool at the end of the first week. Fenby's home debut came the following weekend on 14 November 2009 against Worcester Warriors, and he made his Celtic League debut in the Scarlets' next fixture against Edinburgh on 4 December; he played a major part in the Scarlets' first try of the game, receiving the ball from Jonathan Davies before jinking past a couple of Edinburgh defenders and offloading out of a tackle to Richie Pugh, who was left with a simple finish. Fenby made his Heineken Cup debut the following weekend, playing in a 32–7 defeat to reigning champions Leinster.

Over the Christmas and New Year period, Fenby appeared in both of the Scarlets' Welsh derby matches against the Ospreys on Boxing Day and the Newport Gwent Dragons on New Year's Eve. Against the Dragons, he crossed the line for a try after being played in by Jonathan Davies, but the ball was knocked from his grasp in a try-saving tackle from former Scarlet Matthew Watkins before it could be grounded. It took Fenby until 5 March 2010 to score his first Magners League try, crossing in a 25–8 win over Ulster; in the third minute, Joe Ajuwa broke down the right wing, but he was brought down just short of the line. Scrum-half Tavis Knoyle spread the ball wide left to Rhys Priestland, and it was then a matter of putting the ball through the hands to provide Fenby with a simple run-in for the try. He scored again against Edinburgh three weeks later; after playing a part in his team's first try, with 10 minutes left to play, Fenby beat four Edinburgh defenders to claim a losing bonus point for the Scarlets. As a reward for his successful first season with the Scarlets, Fenby was given a new two-year contract with the region on 23 April 2010.

After impressing in pre-season ahead of the 2010–11 campaign, Fenby started the season as one of the Scarlets' starting line-up, filling in at full-back after Morgan Stoddart was injured in the season opener against Treviso. However, after scoring the opening try of a 49–10 defeat of league newcomers Aironi, Fenby suffered a groin injury in the team's very next game against the Newport Gwent Dragons. He returned to action for the final 35 minutes of the Scarlets' 25–16 win over London Irish in the Anglo-Welsh Cup on 14 November 2010, but a recurrence of the injury kept him out for the remainder of the season.

Fenby finally returned to the Scarlets side for the start of the 2011–12 season, reclaiming his place on the left wing and scoring in the opening game of the season against Aironi, against whom his last try for the region had come almost 12 months earlier. He retained his place on the wing for most of the season, his best spell coming in March 2012, when he scored four tries in four games, including a brace of tries against the Cardiff Blues, his first of his professional career. He also came close to scoring against Northampton Saints in the semi-finals of the Anglo-Welsh Cup; he made a clean break after the Scarlets declined a kickable penalty, only to be brought down by a covering defender 10 metres short of the try line. Following his impressive end to the season, the Scarlets extended Fenby's contract by another year.

Fenby missed just eight games of the Scarlets' 2012–13 campaign, and finished the season as the region's top try-scorer, ahead of Welsh international wing George North. He started the season in good form, scoring five tries in the first four games, and only missed out on scoring in all four matches because of a controversial tackle by Ospreys flanker George Stowers as he was in the process of grounding the ball. With six more tries to his name by March, Fenby attracted the attention of London Irish, who beat off interest from other clubs to bring him back to the English Premiership on a three-year contract from the 2013–14 season. Fenby's tries in 2012–13 helped the Scarlets to fourth in the Pro 12 table and a place in the championship play-offs; however, defeat to Ulster in the semi-finals brought the Scarlets' season to an end. His performances also led to speculation that a Wales call-up might have been on the cards for the team's summer tour against Japan, but he was eventually left out in favour of younger alternatives in Dafydd Howells, Liam Williams, Harry Robinson and Tom Prydie.

=== London Irish ===
Fenby made his debut for London Irish on the opening day of the 2013–14 season against Saracens, coming on as a 74th-minute replacement for England international wing Marland Yarde. His first start came the following week, when he started on the left wing in place of Samoan international Sailosi Tagicakibau against Worcester Warriors. It took until his fourth appearance for Fenby to score his first try for the Exiles, scoring the third of nine tries in a 60–11 thrashing of Cavalieri in the Amlin Challenge Cup on 11 October 2013.

After three seasons with London Irish, Fenby retired from professional rugby at the end of the 2015–16 season, having scored 28 tries in 61 appearances for the club.

=== Saracens ===
In October 2016, Fenby was contacted by Saracens, who needed cover in their back three during the 2016 Autumn internationals. He signed a three-month contract with the club on 4 October 2016, and made his debut on 5 November 2016, starting at fullback in a 36–32 loss to Gloucester. He made three more appearances before the end of his contract.

== Honours ==
Blaydon

- National Division Three North champions: 2006–07

County/Representative

- Part of Northumberland County Championship Shield winning squad: 2008
- Selected for England Counties XV tour of North America: 2008

== Personal life ==
Before Fenby went into professional rugby, he was employed by PricewaterhouseCoopers – who sponsored him through his business, accounting and finance degree at Newcastle University – and worked at their branch in Jesmond. He passed his Associate Chartered Accountant exams in November 2008, and gained around 380 of the 450 days required to become a fully qualified chartered accountant before joining the Scarlets in May 2009.
