= Scott Williams (rugby union) =

Welsh rugby player

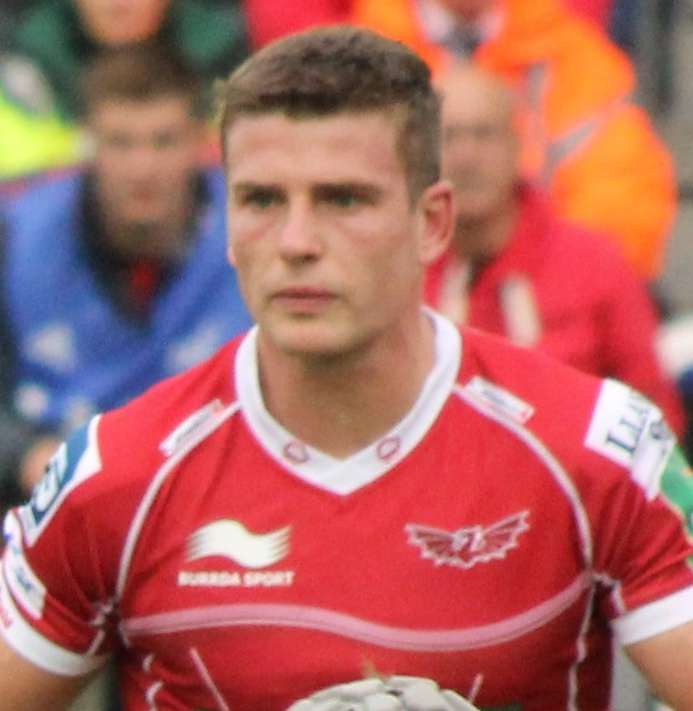
- Born: 10 October 1990 (age 36) Carmarthen, Wales
- Height: 1.83 m (6 ft 0 in)
- Weight: 97 kg (15 st 4 lb; 214 lb)

Rugby union career
- Position: Inside Centre
- Current team: Scarlets
Amateur team(s)
| Years | Team | Apps | (Points) |
- Whitland RFC
Senior career
| Years | Team | Apps | (Points) |
| 2008–2011 | Llanelli RFC | 37 | (50) |
| 2009–2018 | Scarlets | 135 | (117) |
| 2018–2021 | Ospreys | 29 | (25) |
| 2021–2024 | Scarlets | 20 | (5) |
| 2024- | Dragons | 2 | (0) |
- Correct as of 18 March 2025
International career
| Years | Team | Apps | (Points) |
| 2009–2010 | Wales U20 | 19 | (15) |
| 2011–2022 | Wales | 58 | (60) |
- Correct as of 31 August 2019

Scott Williams (born 10 October 1990) is a Welsh international rugby union player who most recently played for the Pontypool RFC and the Dragons RFC in the United Rugby Championship.

Born in Carmarthen, Williams attended Coleg Sir Gar, and is a fluent Welsh speaker.

== Club career ==
Williams played for Whitland RFC before joining Llanelli RFC. In 2009, Williams joined the Scarlets.

In 2018, Williams signed for the Ospreys. Williams dealt with numerous injuries over the following years, including a bulging disc.

Williams rejoined the Scarlets in 2021. He extended his contract in 2022.

Williams was named man of the match against his former club the Ospreys, as the Scarlets won 22–19 on the 2022 New Years derby.

== International career ==
Williams has represented Wales U16, U18 and U20.

It was announced on 9 May 2011 that Williams, along with eight other Scarlets players, was in the Wales senior team against the Barbarians on 4 June 2011. He made his full international debut as a second-half replacement.

Williams was then named in Wales' provisional 45 man World Cup squad, completing a training camp in Spala, Poland. After impressive performances off the bench against England at Twickenham and the Millennium Stadium, Williams was chosen as one of four centres in the final 30 man squad for the 2011 Rugby World Cup in New Zealand.

Williams scored a hat trick against Namibia, as Wales set their highest ever World Cup score, winning 81–7. By the end of the tournament, Williams scored four tries in total, with Wales finishing fourth.

Williams replaced the injured Jamie Roberts at half-time at Twickenham on 25 February 2012 in Wales' third Six Nations victory against England. He scored a solo try from the half-way line, having ripped the ball from England forward Courtney Lawes. This try proved pivotal in Wales' victory and them winning the Grand Slam.

A shoulder injury in the second week of the 2014 Six Nations prevented Williams from taking any further part of the tournament.

On 8 August 2015, Williams captained Wales for the first time, in the World Cup warmup test against Ireland. He was selected in the final squad for the 2015 Rugby World Cup.

Throughout 2017, Williams established himself as first choice inside centre for Wales, ousting Jamie Roberts. Williams started all Six Nations tests, and three of the autumn internationals, scoring against both New Zealand and South Africa. He continued this into 2018, starting four of the Six Nations tests, and starting both matches against Argentina as Wales toured North and South America.

Injuries prevented Williams from taking part in either the 2018 Autumn internationals and 2019 Six Nations.

In 2021, Williams was briefly recalled to the Welsh squad, after Willis Halaholo tested positive for coronavirus. Upon Halaholo's recovery, Williams was released back to the Scarlets and did not feature for Wales.

=== International tries ===
| Try | Opponent | Location | Venue | Competition | Date | Result |
|---|---|---|---|---|---|---|
| 1 | Namibia | New Plymouth, New Zealand | Yarrow Stadium | 2011 Rugby World Cup | 26 September 2011 | Win |
| 2 | Namibia | New Plymouth, New Zealand | Yarrow Stadium | 2011 Rugby World Cup | 26 September 2011 | Win |
| 3 | Namibia | New Plymouth, New Zealand | Yarrow Stadium | 2011 Rugby World Cup | 26 September 2011 | Win |
| 4 | Fiji | Hamilton, New Zealand | Waikato Stadium | 2011 Rugby World Cup | 2 October 2011 | Win |
| 5 | England | London, England | Twickenham | 2012 Six Nations | 25 February 2012 | Win |
| 6 | New Zealand | Cardiff, Wales | Millennium Stadium | 2012 Autumn Internationals | 24 November 2012 | Loss |
| 7 | Italy | Cardiff, Wales | Millennium Stadium | 2014 Six Nations | 1 February 2014 | Win |
| 8 | Ireland | Cardiff, Wales | Millennium Stadium | 2015 Six Nations | 14 March 2015 | Win |
| 9 | Italy | Rome, Italy | Stadio Olimpico | 2015 Six Nations | 21 March 2015 | Win |
| 10 | Australia | Cardiff, Wales | Millennium Stadium | 2016 Autumn Internationals | 5 November 2016 | Loss |
| 11 | New Zealand | Cardiff, Wales | Millennium Stadium | 2017 Autumn Internationals | 25 November 2017 | Loss |
| 12 | South Africa | Cardiff, Wales | Millennium Stadium | 2017 Autumn Internationals | 2 December 2017 | Win |
