= Steven Shingler =

Welsh rugby union player (born 1991)

- Born: Steven Shingler; 20 June 1991 (age 35) Swansea, Wales
- Height: 191 cm (6 ft 3 in)
- Weight: 88 kg (13 st 12 lb)
- School: Coleg Sir Gâr
- Notable relative: Aaron Shingler (brother)

Rugby union career
- Position: Fly-half/Centre/Fullback
- Current team: Ealing Trailfinders
Senior career
Years	Team	Apps	(Points)
2009–2011	Llanelli RFC	53	(412)
2011–2013	London Irish	29	(89)
2013–2016	Scarlets	63	(348)
2013–2016	Llanelli RFC	5	(45)
2016–2019	Cardiff Blues	25	(205)
2019	Mont-de-Marsan	8	(71)
2019–	Ealing Trailfinders	48	(275)
- Correct as of 22 April 2023
International career
Years	Team	Apps	(Points)
2009–2011	Wales U20	14	(33)
- Correct as of 5 February 2016
Coaching career
- Years: Team
- 2019–: London Welsh (attack)

Steven Shingler (born 20 June 1991) is a professional rugby union player for Ealing Trailfinders in the RFU Championship. His favoured position is Fly-half but he also plays centre and full-back. His older brother Aaron Shingler is a Wales international rugby union player.

== Club career ==
Shingler played youth rugby for Hendy RFC. He also played for Scarlets U18 from 2009 to 2011 and has represented Wales Under-20s at fly-half

Shingler made his competitive debut for Llanelli RFC in 2009 against Cross Keys. He played for the Scarlets in four games, two of which were pre-season fixtures against Gloucester and Worcester. He also played for the Scarlets in their LV=Cup games, against Leeds and London Irish, scoring 20 points against the Exiles.

Llanelli director of rugby Anthony Buchanan described Shingler as a kicker of "international standard".

Shingler signed for London Irish on a two-year deal, starting in 2011–2012 season.

In January 2013 it was confirmed Steven Shingler would rejoin the Scarlets for the 2013–14 season

In March 2016 it was confirmed Shingler would head east of Llanelli to join rivals Cardiff Blues for the 2016–17 season, doing a straight swap with Rhys Patchell

On 8 March 2019, Shingler was granted early release from Cardiff Blues to sign a short-term deal with Pro D2 outfit Mont-de-Marsan in France.

On 29 March 2019, it was announced that Shingler would return to England, signing a contract with the Ealing Trailfinders in the RFU Championship for the 2019–20 season. Shingler was named as the club captain for the 2022–23 RFU Championship season.

== International career ==
Steven Shingler was born in Swansea, Wales and represented Wales Under-20's on fourteen occasions. On 17 November 2011 he stated his commitment to break into the Wales senior squad.

On 5 January 2012, Shingler was named in the provisional Scotland squad for the 2012 Six Nations, based on the fact that his mother was born in Dumfries, Scotland. However, due to his appearances for Wales u-20, the WRU contested this call up, stating that Wales had officially declared their u-20 squad as their second XV at the time, which they understood made Shingler ineligible to represent any country other than Wales under the 'capture' rules. The Scottish Rugby Union defended their selection, saying that Shingler had refused to sign a document tying himself to Wales and believed he was eligible to play internationally for Scotland. However the WRU challenged this position, and the IRB ruled that Shingler was only eligible to play for Wales, and not Scotland. In May 2012 an IRB appeal hearing confirmed the earlier ruling that Shingler can only represent Wales.

In May 2013 he was selected in the Wales national rugby union team 32-man training squad for the summer 2013 tour to Japan. He was also selected for the full national squad tour to South Africa in June 2014.

== Coaching career ==
In 2019, Shingler began coaching with London Welsh, working as the backs coach while still playing for Ealing.
