= Phil John (rugby union, born 1981) =

Welsh rugby union footballer

- Born: Phil John; 25 April 1981 (age 45) Gorseinon, Wales
- Height: 1.87 m (6 ft 2 in)
- Weight: 121 kg (19 st 1 lb)
- School: Ysgol y Strade

Rugby union career
- Position: Prop
Senior career
Years	Team	Apps	(Points)
2003–11	Llanelli RFC	19	(10)
2005–10	Llandovery RFC	25	(5)
- Narberth RFC
2016–17	RGC 1404		
- Correct as of 16 February 2016
Provincial / State sides
Years	Team	Apps	(Points)
1999–2016	Scarlets	330	(70)
- Correct as of 21 September 2016

Phil John (born 25 April 1981) is a Welsh rugby union footballer who is a coach and formerly played at prop. His was a player-coach at RGC 1404 after he left the Scarlets after playing his final game against the Glasgow Warriors. He had represented the Scarlets for 17 seasons and made 330 appearances for the team. He has coached at Llanelli RFC, at RGC 1404, and was appointed as an academy skills coach by the Scarlets in 2021.

John was born in Gorseinon. He was a member of the Llandovery RFC team that won the Welsh Rugby Union Challenge Cup in 2007. During his final season at the Scarlets, he was the only player in the squad which was part of the team that won the Celtic League in 2004.
