= Aaron Shingler =

Welsh cricketer and rugby union player

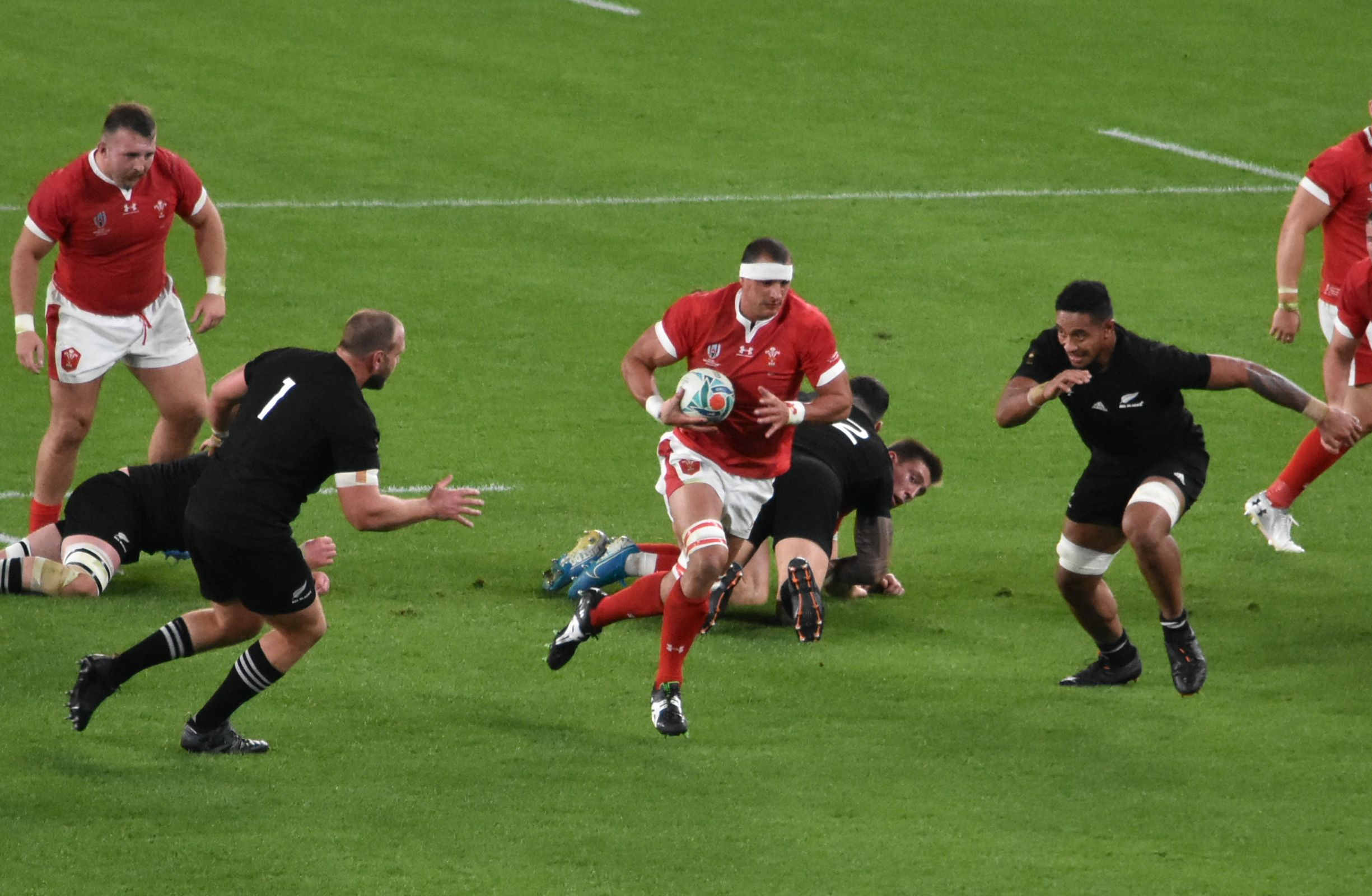
- Shingler in action against New Zealand at the 2019 Rugby World Cup
- Born: Aaron Shingler; 7 August 1987 (age 39) Aldershot, England
- Height: 197 cm (6 ft 6 in)
- Weight: 105 kg (16 st 7 lb)
- School: Pontarddulais Comprehensive School
- Notable relative: Steven Shingler (brother)

Rugby union career
- Position: Blindside Flanker
- Current team: Scarlets
Senior career
Years	Team	Apps	(Points)
2007–2011	Llanelli RFC	68	(60)
- Correct as of 19:56, 18 February 2016 (UTC)
Provincial / State sides
Years	Team	Apps	(Points)
2008–2023	Scarlets	196	(55)
- Correct as of 19:56, 18 February 2016 (UTC)
International career
Years	Team	Apps	(Points)
2011–2020	Wales	24	(5)
- Correct as of 10:31, 22 October 2019 (UTC)

Aaron Craig Shingler (born 7 August 1987) is a Wales international rugby union player and former cricketer. His usual rugby position is flanker.

== Background ==
Born 7 August 1987, Shingler grew up in the west of Wales, attending Pontarddulais Comprehensive School and Gorseinon College.

== Cricket ==
Before turning to professional rugby, Shingler was a promising cricketer. He bats right-handed and is a right-arm medium-fast bowler. Having played for the previous three seasons in the Second XI, Shingler signed to the senior Glamorgan team for the 2007 season. However, he was released from the club at the end of the season. He played once for the England Under-19s team in a Youth One-Day International against Bangladesh in 2005 and has also played for Wales Minor Counties in the MCCA Trophy.

== Rugby ==
After being released by Glamorgan, Shingler signed for Welsh Premier Division rugby union side Llanelli RFC. In April 2009, he was promoted to the Scarlets regional side for their West Wales derby match against the Ospreys on 18 April. He then played in three of the Scarlets' four remaining fixtures, missing only the 45–8 away defeat by Leinster as he was playing for Llanelli in the 2009 WRU Challenge Cup final against Neath. He scored a solo 70-metre try, but it was not enough to prevent Neath from winning 27–21.

Shingler missed much of the 2020–21 season, due to a career threatening blood infection called reactive arthritis. He returned to playing in March 2021.

On April 21st 2023 it was announced that Shingler would be hanging up his boots after 15 years. Finishing his career with the Scarlets at the end of the 2022/2023 season. With his last appearance coming when Scarlets played against Glasgow in the EPCR Challenge Cup Semi Final

== International ==
In 2010, Shingler was selected for Wales' 2010 Commonwealth Games Sevens squad.

In January 2012, Shingler was called into Wales' 35-man senior squad for the training camp in Poland prior to the 2012 Six Nations Championship. He made his full international debut for Wales against Scotland on 12 February 2012.

=== International tries ===
Try	Opponent	Location	Venue	Competition	Date	Result
1	Ireland	Dublin, Ireland	Lansdowne Road	2018 Six Nations	24 February 2018	Loss
