= Dan Newton =

Welsh rugby union player

Daniel Newton
- Born: 30 December 1989 (age 36) Carmarthen, Wales
- Height: 1.73 m (5 ft 8 in)
- Weight: 87 kg (13 st 10 lb)
- School: Ysgol Dyffryn Taf
- University: University of Wales Trinity Saint David

Rugby union career
- Position: Fly-half / fullback
Senior career
Years	Team	Apps	(Points)
2007–2012	Llanelli RFC	76	(302)
2012–2013	Carmarthen Quins	14	(113)
2013–2016	London Scottish	59	(132)
2018–2020	I Medicei	48	(388)
2020–2024	Valorugby Emilia	45	(330)
Provincial / State sides
Years	Team	Apps	(Points)
2009–2013	Scarlets	54	(147)
International career
Years	Team	Apps	(Points)
2009	Wales U20	5	(4)
Coaching career
- Years: Team
- 2024–: Valorugby Emilia (Assistant coach)

Daniel Newton (born 30 December 1989) was a Welsh born rugby union footballer who played for Valorugby Emilia in Top12 from 2020 to 2024. He played at Fly-half or Full back. From summer 2024 he is Assistant coach of Valorugby Emilia.

Newton is also an ex-Wales U20 international, having made 5 appearances at the 2009 U20 World Championship.
