= Jonathan Davies (rugby union, born 1988) =

Wales and British Lions international rugby union player

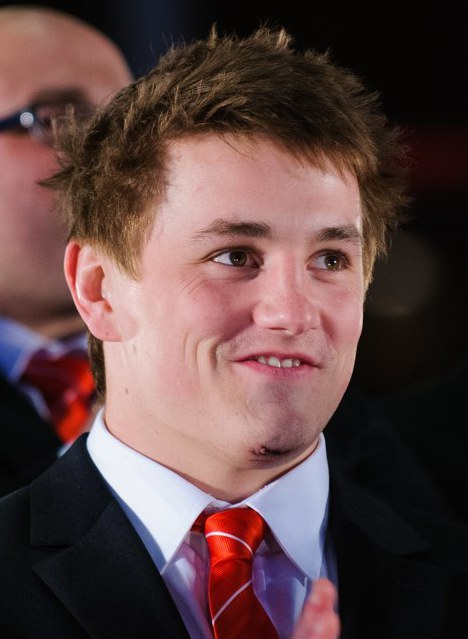
- Davies in 2012
- Born: Jonathan Davies; 5 April 1988 (age 38) Solihull, England
- Height: 1.85 m (6 ft 1 in)
- Weight: 104 kg (16 st 5 lb; 229 lb)
- School: Dyffryn Taf Comprehensive
- University: Trinity College, Carmarthen
- Notable relative: James Davies (brother)

Rugby union career
- Position: Centre
Senior career
Years	Team	Apps	(Points)
2006–2008	Llanelli	14	(10)
2006–2014	Scarlets	104	(180)
2014–2016	Clermont Auvergne	31	(20)
2016–2024	Scarlets	75	(85)
- Correct as of 30 March 2024
International career
Years	Team	Apps	(Points)
2008	Wales U20	5	(5)
2009–2022	Wales	96	(80)
2013, 2017	British & Irish Lions	6	(0)
- Correct as of 18:35, 3 March 2023 (UTC)

Jonathan Davies (born 5 April 1988) is a Welsh former professional rugby union player who played at centre for the Scarlets and the Wales national team. His brother is James Davies, who also played professional rugby for Wales as a flanker.

== Early life and education ==
Born to Welsh parents in Solihull, England, Davies moved at a young age with his family to Bancyfelin, Carmarthenshire, where his parents ran the Fox and Hounds pub; Davies is commonly known as "Fox", differentiating him from the Jonathan Davies who played both rugby union and rugby league during the 1980s and 1990s. He attended Dyffryn Taf Comprehensive School in Whitland, Carmarthenshire, and is a fluent Welsh speaker. Davies studied Sports and Exercise course at Trinity College, Carmarthen.

== Club career ==
Davies started his career playing age-grade rugby for Llanelli RFC. He made his senior professional debut for the Llanelli Scarlets region before his first appearance for the senior Llanelli club side, playing against Northampton Saints on 11 August 2006. However, it took him until his sixth appearance (more than a year later) to score his first try, as he touched down against Connacht on 28 September 2007.

On 12 November 2013, Davies signed for French club Clermont Auvergne in the Top 14 on a two-year deal.

On 13 November 2015, Davies returned to Scarlets from Clermont Auvergne on a national dual contract with the Welsh Rugby Union.

== International career ==
=== Wales ===
In 2009, Davies received his first call-up to the Welsh senior team for their mid-year tour of North America. He made his international debut in the first game of the tour, starting at outside centre against Canada on 30 May 2009. He also played in the match against the United States, and scored two tries.

For this performance and his form for the Scarlets, Davies was one of four Scarlets included in Wales's 29-man squad for the 2009 Autumn internationals. After being named as an unused substitute for the New Zealand game on 7 November, Davies was again named on the bench against Samoa on 13 November, taking the place of the injured Tom Shanklin after 49 minutes. With Shanklin injured, Davies was picked to partner Jamie Roberts at inside centre against Argentina on 21 November. Although Wales won the match 33–16, it was an error from Davies that led to Argentina's only try; Davies attempted to kick the ball forward, but it cannoned off the legs of his opposite number, Martín Rodríguez, who gathered the ball and took it back in himself for the try. Nevertheless, Davies and Roberts formed a solid partnership in the middle of the field for the majority of the game, and Argentina were otherwise limited to penalty goals. Despite his error, Davies retained the number 12 jersey for the final match of the series against Australia, although an injury to winger Leigh Halfpenny within the first 30 minutes meant that Davies spent the majority of the game playing out of position on the right wing; Wales lost the match 33–12.

On 18 January 2010, Davies was named in the 35-man Wales squad for the 2010 Six Nations tournament. However, he was not named in the 22-man squad for any of Wales's five matches in the competition. He returned to the Wales team on their summer tour of New Zealand, coming on as a substitute for Jamie Roberts for the last 10 minutes of the first Test on 19 June. An injury to Andrew Bishop prior to the second Test the following weekend saw Davies and Roberts renew their centre partnership, though this time Davies occupied the outside position. Davies spearheaded one of Wales's best attacks of the game, but attempted to go solo for the goal line instead of offloading to one of three supporting runners with the line at their mercy.

On 21 October 2010, Davies was again named in the Wales squad for the Autumn international series, but he was preferred for each of the games by a combination of James Hook, Tom Shanklin and Andrew Bishop.

Following a 2011 6-Nations series in which Davies returned as a starting centre, he was named in Wales's preliminary World Cup squad. Davies completed both infamous training camps in Spala, Poland and was subsequently named as one of four centres. He started in all three of the side's pre-tournament tests against England, home and away, and Argentina at home.

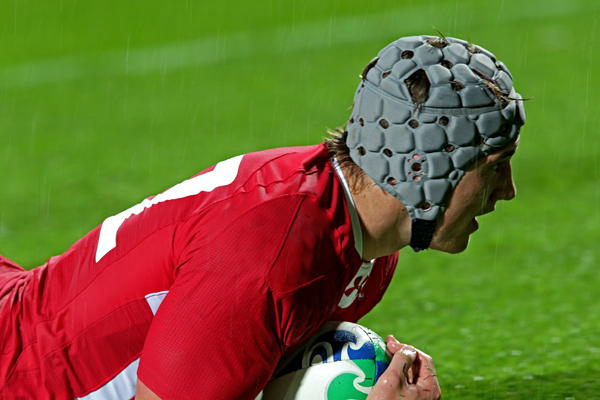
Davies scored his fourth international try against Fiji in the Pool D match at the 2011 Rugby World Cup

During the 2011 Rugby World Cup Davies played a part in every Welsh game from the opening fixture against South Africa through to their third-place play-off defeat by Australia, forming a formidable centre partnership with Jamie Roberts.

Davies returned to the Scarlets squad in time for their opening Heineken Cup pool game against Castres. Enjoying a successful 2011 with both region and country, Davies rose to international status through the ranks of quality Welsh centres.

In 2012, Davies was a member of the Wales team which won the Championship, achieving their third Grand Slam in eight tournaments.

In 2015, Davies missed the 2015 Rugby World Cup after suffering an anterior cruciate ligament injury.

In September 2019, Davies was named in Wales' 31-man squad for the 2019 Rugby World Cup in Japan, where he played in five matches.

=== Lions ===
Davies was selected to play for the 2013 British & Irish Lions tour to Australia. He was controversially selected in the third test ahead of Brian O'Driscoll in what would have been O'Driscoll's last appearance for the British & Irish Lions. The Lions won the third test convincingly.

Davies was again selected to play on the 2017 Lions tour of New Zealand. He was voted player of the series by his Lions team-mates.

=== International tries ===
Try	Opponent	Location	Venue	Competition	Date	Result
1	United States	Chicago, United States	Toyota Park	2009 summer tour	6 June 2009	Win
2	United States	Chicago, United States	Toyota Park	2009 summer tour	6 June 2009	Win
3	Namibia	New Plymouth, New Zealand	Yarrow Stadium	2011 Rugby World Cup	26 September 2011	Win
4	Fiji	Hamilton, New Zealand	Waikato Stadium	2011 Rugby World Cup	2 October 2011	Win
5	Ireland	Wellington, New Zealand	Westpac Stadium	2011 Rugby World Cup	8 October 2011	Win
6	Ireland	Dublin, Ireland	Lansdowne Road	2012 Six Nations	5 February 2012	Win
7	Ireland	Dublin, Ireland	Lansdowne Road	2012 Six Nations	5 February 2012	Win
8	Australia	Melbourne, Australia	Docklands Stadium	2012 summer tour	16 June 2012	Loss
9	Italy	Rome, Italy	Stadio Olimpico	2013 Six Nations	23 February 2013	Win
10	Scotland	Edinburgh, Scotland	Murrayfield	2015 Six Nations	15 February 2015	Win
11	Italy	Cardiff, Wales	Millennium Stadium	2016 Six Nations	19 March 2016	Win
12	New Zealand	Wellington, New Zealand	Westpac Stadium	2016 summer tour	18 June 2016	Loss
13	Italy	Rome, Italy	Stadio Olimpico	2017 Six Nations	5 February 2017	Win
14	Scotland	Cardiff, Wales	Millennium Stadium	2018 Autumn internationals	3 November 2018	Win
15	Scotland	Edinburgh, Scotland	Murrayfield	2019 Six Nations	9 March 2019	Win
16	Georgia	Toyota, Japan	Toyota Stadium	2019 Rugby World Cup	23 September 2019	Win

== Playing style ==
Davies has an all-round game including opportunistic try scoring, kicking and physical presence, but he is particularly valued for his defensive marshalling and protection of the 13 channel, including remaining linked with his defensive colleagues, and occasional spot-blitzing.

== Personal life ==
Davies is married, supports Manchester United in soccer and is a fan of Tom Brady in American Football. Davies' brother James Davies also played rugby for Scarlets and Wales as well as winning a Silver Medal with Great Britain sevens at the 2016 Summer Olympics.

Davies was named BBC Cymru Wales Sports Personality of the Year for 2017.

On 5 August 2019, Davies was inducted into the Gorsedd of Bards at the National Eisteddfod of Wales in Llanrwst, under the Bardic name "Jon Cadno" (a literal translation of his nickname, Jon Fox).

In 2025 Davies was announced as an ambassador for charity Working Options in Education <https://www.workingoptions.org.uk>, helping to drive forward their mission to help every young person in Wales access the skills, knowledge and opportunities they need for career success.
