= 2019–20 Scarlets season =

Scarlets
- 2019–20 season
- Head coach: Brad Mooar; Glenn Delaney
- Chairman: Simon Muderack
- Pro 14: 3rd, conference B
- European Rugby Challenge Cup: Quarter-finals
- Top try scorer: League: Steff Evans – 9 All: Steff Evans – 11
- Top points scorer: League: Dan Jones – 74; All: Dan Jones – 95
- Highest home attendance: 13,682 vs. Ospreys (26 December 2019)
- Lowest home attendance: 5,639 vs. Edinburgh (15 February 2020) (Note: Excluding the matches against Cardiff Blues and Dragons that were played behind closed doors)
- Average home attendance: 7,116

The 2019–20 season was the 16th season in the history of the Scarlets, a Welsh regional rugby union side based in Llanelli, Carmarthenshire. They competed in the Pro14 and after failing to qualify for the Champions Cup the previous season for the first time in their history, participated in the Challenge Cup.

It was the team's first and only season under head coach Brad Mooar, who was assisted by defence coach Glenn Delaney and assistant attack coach Richard Whiffin, following Wayne Pivac's departure to leathe Wales national team. On 24 December 2019, it was announced that Mooar would leave the Scarlets at the end of the season to join the New Zealand All Blacks' coaching team.

On 12 March 2020, the season was indefinitely suspended due to the COVID-19 pandemic. The regular season resumed on 22 August 2020, with the number of rounds reduced from 21 to 15; any postponed games were deemed 0-0 draws, with both teams awarded two points. Rounds 14 and 15 consisted of derbie matches for each Welsh region, with the top two teams in each conference advancing to the semi-final stage. Delaney took charge as head coach after Mooar's departure, leading the team in the games played in August and September 2020.

== Pre-season and friendlies ==
Date	Opponents	H / A	Result F–A	Scorers	Attendance
7 September 2019	Jersey Reds	A	49–17	Tries: James 2' c, M. Jones 26' c, Hughes 45' c, Prydie 53' c, Rawlins 65' c, O'Brien 72' c, Conbeer 75' c Conversions: D. Jones (2) 2', 26', O'Brien (5) 45', 53', 65', 72', 75'	1,077
14 September 2019	Dragons	A	17–34	Tries: D. Jones 54' m, Baldwin 68' c, Lewis 79' m Conversion: D. Jones 68'	2,657

== Pro14 ==
=== Fixtures ===
Date	Opponents	H / A	Result F–A	Scorers	Attendance	Table position
28 September 2019	Connacht	H	18–10	Tries: St. Evans 19' m, Asquith 34' c Conversion: D. Jones 34'; Penalties: D. Jones (2) 43', 59'	6,415	4th
4 October 2019	Glasgow Warriors	A	25–21	Tries: Hardy 45' c, Asquith 49' c, St. Evans 51' m Conversions: D. Jones 45', O'Brien 50'; Penalties: D. Jones (2) 23', 37'	6,897	1st
12 October 2019	Zebre	H	54–10	Tries: Hardy (2) 1' c, 28' c, Macleod 7' m, Conbeer 21'c, T. Davies 42' c, McNicholl (2) 49' c, 80' c, Helps 72'; Conversions: D. Jones (4) 2', 22', 29', 43', O'Brien (3) 49', 73', 80+1'	6,424	1st
26 October 2019	Edinburgh	A	7–46	Try: M. Jones 59' c Conversion: D. Jones 59'	5,191	4th
2 November 2019	Cheetahs	H	17–13	Tries: St. Evans 21' c, Hardy 36' c Conversions: D. Jones (2) 22', 38'; Penalty: D. Jones 68'	6,381	1st
9 November 2019	Benetton	H	20–17	Tries: St. Evans 5' c, R. Evans 53' c Conversions: D. Jones (2) 7', 54'; Penalties D. Jones (2) 28', 80+1'	6,383	2nd
29 November 2019	Ulster	A	5–29	Try: Morgan 74' m	12,319	4th
21 December 2019	Dragons	A	20–22	Tries: G. Davies 24' c, Owens 29' c Conversions: Halfpenny (2) 25', 30'; Penalties: Halfpenny (2) 3', 75'	5,517	4th
26 December 2019	Ospreys	H	44–0	Tries: St. Evans (2) 24' c, 59' m, Conbeer (2) 38' c, 53' m, Hardy 63' c, Macleod 72' c Conversions: Halfpenny (3) 25', 40', 64', O'Brien 73'; Penalties: Halfpenny (2) 17', 30'	13,682	2nd
3 January 2020	Cardiff Blues	A	16–14	Try: G. Davies 27' c Conversion: Halfpenny 28'; Penalties: Halfpenny (3) 7', 11', 40'	12,125	1st
15 February 2020	Edinburgh	H	9–14	Penalties: D. Jones (3) 10', 35', 47'	5,639	3rd
23 February 2020	Southern Kings	H	36–17	Tries: Ratuva 19' c, Kennedy 33' m, Conbeer 51' c, Cassiem 61' c, D. Davis 68' m, Rogers 71'm Conversions: D. Jones (3) 20', 52', 62'	5,965	3rd
29 February 2020	Munster	A	10–29	Try: Sebastian 60' c Conversion: D. Jones 61'; Penalty: D. Jones 7'	13,554	3rd
20 March 2020	Connacht	A	P–P			
28 March 2020	Dragons	H	P–P			
11 April 2020	Southern Kings	A	P–P			
18 April 2020	Cardiff Blues	H	P–P			
24 April 2020	Benetton	A	P–P			
9 May 2020	Leinster	H	P–P			
16 May 2020	Munster	H	P–P			
30 May 2020	Ospreys	A	P–P			
22 August 2020	Cardiff Blues	H	32–12	Tries: Kennedy 4' m, St. Evans (2) 22' c, 42' m, Lousi 48' c, McNicholl 55' m Conversions: Halfpenny (2) 23', 50'; Penalties: Halfpenny 32'	0 (Note: The matches against Cardiff Blues and Dragons will be played behind closed doors due to the COVID-19 pandemic in Europe.)	3rd
29 August 2020	Dragons	A	41–20	Tries: Lee 18' c, St. Evans 26' c, Ja. Davies 31' m, McNicholl 55' c, Rogers 66' m, Blacker 70' c Conversions: D. Jones (4) 19', 27', 56', 71'; Penalty: D. Jones 60'	0	3rd

=== Table ===
Conference B

Pos	Team	Pld	W	D	L	F	A	PD	BP	Pts
2	(Ireland) Munster	15	10	0	5	426	255	+171	11	51
3	(Wales) Scarlets	15	10	0	5	354	274	+80	7	47
4	(Ireland) Connacht	15	8	0	7	302	360	−58	8	40

== Rugby Challenge Cup ==
=== Pool stage ===
==== Fixtures ====
Date	Opponents	H / A	Result F–A	Scorers	Attendance	Table position
16 November 2019	London Irish	H	20–16	Tries: Baldwin 28' c, S. Hughes 51' c Conversions: D. Jones (2) 30', 52'; Penalties: D. Jones (2) 14', 40+1'	6,753	2nd
22 November 2019	Toulon	A	16–17	Try: McNicholl 14' c Conversion: Lamb 15'; Penalties: Lamb 47', D. Jones 67'; Drop Goal: D. Jones 69'	10,212	3rd
7 December 2019	Bayonne	A	19–11	Try: R. Evans 28' c Conversion: Halfpenny 29'; Penalties: Halfpenny (4) 11', 40+1', 50', 56'	5,957	2nd
14 December 2019	Bayonne	H	46–5	Tries: Conbeer 5' m, Elias 47' c, Hardy (2) 50' c, 68' c, O'Brien 56' c, Halfpenny 74' c Conversions: Halfpenny (5) 49', 51', 57', 69', 75'; Penalties: Halfpenny (2) 16', 22'	6,257	2nd
11 January 2020	Toulon	H	15–27	Tries: G. Davies 1' m, St. Evans 73' c Conversions: Halfpenny 74'; Penalties: Halfpenny 10'	7,565	2nd
18 January 2020	London Irish	A	33–14	Tries: Baldwin 21' c, D. Jones 28' c, Hardy 36' c, Penalty Try 46', St. Evans 57' m Conversions: Halfpenny (3) 22', 29', 37'	3,444	2nd

==== Table ====
Pos	Team	Pld	W	D	L	F	A	PD	BP	Pts
1	(France) Toulon	6	6	0	0	177	87	+90	4	28
2	(Wales) Scarlets	6	4	0	2	149	90	+59	3	19
3	(France) Bayonne	6	1	0	5	93	190	−97	3	7
4	(England) London Irish	6	1	0	5	122	174	−52	3	7

=== Knockout stage ===
Date	Round	Opponents	H / A	Result F–A	Scorers	Attendance
19 September 2020	Quarter-final	Toulon	A	6–11	Penalties: Halfpenny (2) 3', 29'	5,000

== Statistics ==
(+ in the Apps column denotes substitute appearance, positions listed are the ones they have started a game in during the season)

Pos.	Name	Pro 14						European Challenge Cup						Total						Discipline	
Pos.	Name	Apps	Try	Con	Pen	Drop	Pts	Apps	Try	Con	Pen	Drop	Pts	Apps	Try	Con	Pen	Drop	Pts	Yellow card	Red card
FB	(Wales) Leigh Halfpenny	4	0	8	9	0	40	5	1	10	9	0	52	9	1	18	18	0	92	0	0
FB/WG	(Wales) Johnny McNicholl	9	4	0	0	0	20	5	1	0	0	0	5	14	5	0	0	0	25	0	0
WG/FB	(Wales) Steffan Evans	16	9	0	0	0	45	7	2	0	0	0	10	23	11	0	0	0	55	0	0
WG	(Wales) Ryan Conbeer	7+3	4	0	0	0	20	1	1	0	0	0	5	8+3	5	0	0	0	25	0	0
WG	(Wales) Corey Baldwin	4+5	0	0	0	0	0	4+1	2	0	0	0	10	8+6	2	0	0	0	10	0	0
WG	(Wales) Tom James	2	0	0	0	0	0	0	0	0	0	0	0	2	0	0	0	0	0	0	0
WG	(Wales) Morgan Williams	1	0	0	0	0	0	0+2	0	0	0	0	0	1+2	0	0	0	0	0	0	0
WG	(Wales) Tom Rogers	0+2	2	0	0	0	10	0	0	0	0	0	0	0+2	2	0	0	0	10	0	0
CE	(Wales) Steffan Hughes	15	0	0	0	0	0	7	1	0	0	0	5	22	1	0	0	0	5	0	0
CE	(Australia) Paul Asquith	7+5	2	0	0	0	10	1+3	0	0	0	0	0	8+8	2	0	0	0	10	0	0
CE	(Wales) Ioan Nicholas	1	0	0	0	0	0	0	0	0	0	0	0	1	0	0	0	0	0	0	0
CE	(Samoa) Kieron Fonotia	3+2	0	0	0	0	0	2	0	0	0	0	0	5+2	0	0	0	0	0	0	0
CE	(Wales) Hadleigh Parkes	3	0	0	0	0	0	2	0	0	0	0	0	5	0	0	0	0	0	0	0
CE	(England) Johnny Williams	2	0	0	0	0	0	1	0	0	0	0	0	3	0	0	0	0	0	0	0
CE	(Wales) Tyler Morgan	0	0	0	0	0	0	0+1	0	0	0	0	0	0+1	0	0	0	0	0	0	0
FH/FB	(Wales) Angus O'Brien	6+5	0	5	0	0	10	2+3	1	0	0	0	5	8+8	1	5	0	0	15	0	0
FH	(Wales) Dan Jones	13	0	19	12	0	74	4+3	1	2	3	1	21	17+3	1	21	15	1	95	0	0
FH	(England) Ryan Lamb	0+3	0	0	0	0	0	1+2	0	1	1	0	5	1+5	0	1	1	0	5	0	0
SH	(Wales) Kieran Hardy	10+4	5	0	0	0	25	3+4	3	0	0	0	15	13+8	8	0	0	0	40	0	0
SH	(Wales) Dane Blacker	0+7	1	0	0	0	5	1+2	0	0	0	0	0	1+9	1	0	0	0	5	0	0
SH	(Wales) Jonathan Evans	1+3	0	0	0	0	0	0+1	0	0	0	0	0	1+4	0	0	0	0	0	0	0
SH	(Wales) Gareth Davies	4	2	0	0	0	10	3	1	0	0	0	5	7	2	0	0	0	15	0	0
N8	(Tonga) Sione Kalamafoni	1	0	0	0	0	0	1	0	0	0	0	0	2	0	0	0	0	0	0	0
N8/FL	(South Africa) Uzair Cassiem	12+2	1	0	0	0	5	5+1	0	0	0	0	0	17+3	1	0	0	0	5	1	0
N8/FL	(Scotland) Blade Thomson	3+1	0	0	0	0	0	4	0	0	0	0	0	7+1	0	0	0	0	0	0	0
FL	(Wales) Josh Macleod	14+1	2	0	0	0	10	6	0	0	0	0	0	20+1	2	0	0	0	10	0	0
FL	(Wales) Tom Phillips	4	0	0	0	0	0	0	0	0	0	0	0	4	0	0	0	0	0	0	0
FL	(Wales) Dan Davis	0+7	1	0	0	0	5	0	0	0	0	0	0	0+7	1	0	0	0	5	0	0
FL	(Australia) Ed Kennedy	5	2	0	0	0	10	0+1	0	0	0	0	0	5+1	2	0	0	0	10	0	0
LK/FL	(Wales) Jac Morgan	1+1	1	0	0	0	5	1+2	0	0	0	0	0	2+3	1	0	0	0	5	0	0
FL	(Wales) Aaron Shingler	5	0	0	0	0	0	3	0	0	0	0	0	8	0	0	0	0	0	0	0
FL	(Wales) James Davies	1+1	1	0	0	0	5	0+1	0	0	0	0	0	1+2	1	0	0	0	5	0	0
LK/FL	(Wales) Lewis Rawlins	10+2	0	0	0	0	0	2+2	0	0	0	0	0	12+4	0	0	0	0	0	1	0
LK	(Australia) Steve Cummins	6+3	0	0	0	0	0	1+1	0	0	0	0	0	7+4	0	0	0	0	0	0	0
LK	(Wales) Josh Helps	0+5	1	0	0	0	5	0+2	0	0	0	0	0	0+7	1	0	0	0	5	0	0
LK	(South Africa) Juandre Kruger	2+1	0	0	0	0	0	1	0	0	0	0	0	3+1	0	0	0	0	0	0	0
LK	(Fiji) Tevita Ratuva	2+4	1	0	0	0	5	3+1	0	0	0	0	0	5+5	1	0	0	0	5	1	1
LK	(Tonga) Sam Lousi	6	1	0	0	0	5	4+1	0	0	0	0	0	10+1	1	0	0	0	5	0	1
LK	(Wales) Jake Ball	4+1	0	0	0	0	0	4	0	0	0	0	0	8+1	0	0	0	0	0	1	0
LK	(New Zealand) Danny Drake	0	0	0	0	0	0	0+1	0	0	0	0	0	0+1	0	0	0	0	0	0	0
HK	(Wales) Marc Jones	3+4	1	0	0	0	5	0+4	0	0	0	0	0	3+8	1	0	0	0	5	0	0
HK	(Wales) Taylor Davies	6+3	1	0	0	0	5	1	0	0	0	0	0	7+3	1	0	0	0	5	0	0
HK	(Wales) Ryan Elias	2+4	0	0	0	0	0	4+2	1	0	0	0	5	6+5	1	0	0	0	5	0	0
HK	(Wales) Ken Owens	4+1	1	0	0	0	5	2+1	0	0	0	0	0	6+2	1	0	0	0	5	0	0
HK	(Wales) Ifan Phillips	0+2	0	0	0	0	0	0	0	0	0	0	0	0+2	0	0	0	0	0	0	0
PR	(Wales) Samson Lee	11	1	0	0	0	5	4+1	0	0	0	0	0	15+1	1	0	0	0	5	0	0
PR	(Wales) Rob Evans	4+3	1	0	0	0	5	2+3	1	0	0	0	5	6+6	2	0	0	0	10	0	0
PR	(Wales) Phil Price	6+10	0	0	0	0	0	1+3	0	0	0	0	0	7+13	0	0	0	0	0	0	0
PR	(South Africa) Werner Kruger	4+8	0	0	0	0	0	2+3	0	0	0	0	0	6+11	0	0	0	0	0	1	0
PR	(Australia) Dylan Evans	0+3	0	0	0	0	0	0+1	0	0	0	0	0	0+4	0	0	0	0	0	0	0
PR	(Wales) Javan Sebastian	0+6	1	0	0	0	5	1+3	0	0	0	0	0	1+9	1	0	0	0	5	0	0
PR	(Wales) Wyn Jones	5	0	0	0	0	0	4	0	0	0	0	0	9	0	0	0	0	0	1	0

Stats correct as of 19 September 2020

== Transfers ==
=== In ===
Date confirmed	Pos.	Name	From	Ref.
2 April 2019	LK	(Tonga) Sam Lousi	(New Zealand) Hurricanes	
20 June 2019	SH	(Wales) Dane Blacker	Cardiff Blues	
20 June 2019	LK	(New Zealand) Danny Drake	(New Zealand) North Harbour	
20 June 2019	PR	(Wales) Alex Jeffries	Ospreys	
2 July 2019	WG	(Wales) Tom James	Cardiff Blues	
20 September 2019	LK	(South Africa) Juandré Kruger	(France) Toulon	
20 September 2019	FH	(England) Ryan Lamb	(France) La Rochelle	
17 February 2020	HK	(Wales) Ifan Phillips	Ospreys (loan)	
25 February 2020	FB	(Wales) Liam Williams	(England) Saracens	
20 May 2020	CE	(Wales) Tyler Morgan	Dragons	
14 July 2020	N8	(Tonga) Sione Kalamafoni	(England) Leicester Tigers	
14 July 2020	CE	(England) Johnny Williams	(England) Newcastle Falcons	
25 August 2020	SH	(England) Will Homer	(England) Jersey Reds	

=== Out ===
Date confirmed	Pos.	Name	To	Ref.
14 March 2019	PR	(Wales) Scott Jenkins	(England) Bedford Blues	
24 March 2019	LK	(England) Tom Price	(England) Exeter Chiefs	
12 April 2019	SH	(Wales) Declan Smith	Released	
20 May 2019	FL	(Wales) Will Boyde	Cardiff Blues	
16 June 2019	LK	(South Africa) David Bulbring	(Japan) Kubota Spears	
21 June 2019	SH	(Scotland) Sam Hidalgo-Clyne	(France) Racing 92	
3 July 2019	PR	(Wales) Nicky Thomas	(England) Bristol Bears	
9 July 2019	FB	(South Africa) Clayton Blommetjies	(South Africa) Free State Cheetahs	
29 November 2019	LK	(South Africa) Juandré Kruger	(South Africa) Bulls	
10 December 2019	PR	(Wales) Rhys Fawcett	Ospreys (loan)	
10 December 2019	PR	(Wales) Simon Gardiner	Ospreys (loan)	
30 January 2020	FB	(Wales) Tomi Lewis	(England) Ampthill (loan)	
2 March 2020	CE	(Wales) Corey Baldwin	(England) Exeter Chiefs	
12 May 2020	WG	(Wales) Tom James	Retired	
13 May 2020	PR	(Wales) Rhys Fawcett	Released	
13 May 2020	PR	(Wales) Simon Gardiner	Released	
13 May 2020	FB	(Wales) Morgan Williams	Released	
13 May 2020	CE	(Samoa) Kieron Fonotia	(New Zealand) Tasman	
13 May 2020	SH	(Wales) Jonathan Evans	Retired	
13 May 2020	CE	(Wales) Hadleigh Parkes	(Japan) Panasonic Wild Knights	
19 August 2020	LK	(New Zealand) Danny Drake	(England) Gloucester Rugby (loan)	
21 August 2020	PR	(Australia) Dylan Evans	(Scotland) Glasgow Warriors (loan)	
27 August 2020	SR	(Australia) Steve Cummins	(France) Section Paloise	
