= 2020–21 Scarlets season =

Scarlets
- 2020–21 season
- Head coach: Glenn Delaney until 8 May; Dai Flanagan since 8 May
- Chairman: Simon Muderack
- Pro 14: 3rd, Conference B
- Pro14 Rainbow Cup: 7th
- European Rugby Champions Cup: Round of 16
- Top try scorer: League: Dane Blacker (6); All: Dane Blacker (9)
- Top points scorer: League: Dan Jones (57); All: Leigh Halfpenny (84)

The 2020–21 season is the 17th season in the history of the Scarlets, a Welsh regional rugby union side based in Llanelli, Carmarthenshire. In this season, they competed in the Pro14 and the Champions Cup.

In December 2020, it was announced that the 2020–21 Pro14 season would conclude on 27 March 2021 after 16 rounds, and will be followed by the Pro14 Rainbow Cup, a competition featuring the four former South African Super Rugby sides, the Bulls, Lions, Sharks and Stormers. The Rainbow Cup would consist of two dual tournaments; one for the northern hemisphere teams and one for the four South African teams. The winners of both tournaments would face off in a final to crown the overall winner.

In April 2021, Dwayne Peel was announced as the head coach for the 2021–22 season, with Glenn Delaney moving to a Director of Rugby role. After a poor run of matches, Delaney was relieved of his duties as head coach and departed the club before assuming the role, with Dai Flanagan stepping in as caretaker head coach on the 8th of May 2021.

At the end of the season, Gareth Davies, Wyn Jones, Ken Owens and Liam Williams were called up to the British & Irish Lions squad for the 2021 tour to South Africa.

== Friendlies ==
Date	Opponents	H / A	Result F–A	Scorers	Attendance
25 September 2020	Ospreys	H	15–25	Tries: Cassiem, Prydie; Conversions: O'Brien (1/2); Penalties: Costelow	0
14 October 2020	Dragons	A	36–10	Tries: Sebastian 17' c, Ma. Jones 39' m, Homer (2) 47' c, 56' c, Costelow 53' c Conversions: O'Brien (2/2) 18', 40', Costelow (3/3) 48', 53', 56'; Penalties: O'Brien 11'	0

== Pro14 ==
=== Fixtures ===
Date	Opponents	H / A	Result F–A	Scorers	Attendance	Table position
3 October 2020	Munster	H	27–30	Penalties: Halfpenny (9/9) 16', 20', 25', 35', 45', 51', 55', 65', 70'	0	4th
11 October 2020	Glasgow Warriors	A	7–20	Tries: Lee 58' c Conversions: Halfpenny (1/1) 60' c	0	4th
23 October 2020	Benetton	A	10–3	Tries: Asquith 68' c Conversions: O'Brien 70'; Penalties: O'Brien 60'	0	4th
1 November 2020	Edinburgh	H	3–6	Penalties: O'Brien 51'	0	4th
8 November 2020	Zebre	H	18–17	Tries: Conbeer 5' m, Blacker 27' c Conversions: O'Brien 29' (1/2); Penalties: O'Brien 18', 76' (2/3)	0	4th
14 November 2020	Connacht	A	20–14	Tries: Conbeer (2) 5' m, 31' m, Blacker 43' c Conversions: D. Jones 43' (1/3); Penalties: D. Jones 35' (1/1)	0	3rd
22 November 2020	Ulster	A	24–26	Tries: Asquith 17' c, Conbeer 41' m, St. Evans 54' m, Price 76' c Conversions: O'Brien (2) 18', 77'	1,000	2nd
26 December 2020	Ospreys	A (Note: Although this fixture counted as an Ospreys home match, the match was played at Parc y Scarlets. The Liberty Stadium was unavailable due to urgent work needed to relay the playing surface.)	16–14	Try: O'Brien 70' c Conversion: D. Jones 71'; Penalties: D. Jones (3) 25', 50', 59'	0	3rd
1 January 2021	Dragons	H	20–3	Tries: Kalamafoni 56' c, Costelow 79' c Conversions: D. Jones 57', Costelow 80'; Penalties: D. Jones (2) 28', 40+1'	0	3rd
9 January 2021	Cardiff Blues	A	20–29	Tries: Jo. Davies 13' c, Kalamafoni 57' c Conversions: Halfpenny (2) 14', 58'; Penalties: D. Jones 33', Halfpenny 44'	0	3rd
22 January 2021	Cardiff Blues	H	10–13	Try: Thomson 66' c Conversion: Halfpenny 68'; Penalty: Halfpenny 48'	0	4th
30 January 2021	Leinster	H	25–52	Tries: Blacker 18' c, Homer 63' m, O'Brien 78' c Conversions: Costelow 19', O'Brien 78'; Penalties: Costelow (2) 2', 33'	0	4th
20 February 2021	Benetton	H	41–17	Tries: J. Morgan (2) 7' m, 27' c, Costelow 24' c, Blacker 30' c, Kalamafoni 71' m, Asquith 77' c Conversions: St. Evans (2) 24', 28', D. Jones (2) 31', 78'; Penalties: D. Jones 65'	0	3rd
27 February 2021	Edinburgh	A	25–27	Tries: T. Morgan 17' c, McNicholl 29' c, Blacker 41' c Conversions: D. Jones (3) 17', 30', 43'; Penalties: D. Jones (2) 8', 46'	0	3rd
12 March 2021	Munster	A	10–28	Try: St. Evans 80+2' c Conversion: O'Brien 80+2'; Penalty:O'Brien 24'	0	3rd
22 March 2021	Connacht	H	41–36	Tries: Shingler 2' m, S. Hughes (2) 30' c, 44' c, Blacker 50' c, Rogers 55' m, Sebastian 72' c Conversions: D. Jones (4) 31', 45', 51', 73'; Penalty: D. Jones 69'	0	3rd

=== Table ===
Conference B

Pos	Team	Pld	W	D	L	F	A	PD	BP	Pts
2	(Ireland) Connacht	16	8	0	8	396	353	+43	13	45
3	(Wales) Scarlets	16	8	0	8	319	333	−14	7	39
4	(Wales) Cardiff Blues	16	8	0	8	265	284	−19	4	36

== Pro14 Rainbow Cup ==
=== Fixtures ===
Date	Opponents	H / A	Result F–A	Scorers	Attendance	Table position
25 April 2021	Dragons	A	32–52	Tries: Rees 6' c, St. Evans (2) 30' m, 67' m, Blacker 33' c, McNicholl 70' m Conversions: Costelow (2) 7', 34'; Penalty: Costelow 24'	0	12th
8 May 2021	Ospreys	H	22–6	Try: Jeffries 38' c Conversion: Halfpenny 38'; Penalties: Halfpenny (5) 17', 25', 34', 43', 76'	0	6th
15 May 2021	Cardiff Blues	H	28–29	Tries: Blacker (2) 63' m, 70' c, O'Brien 73' c Conversions:O'Brien (2) 70', 74'; Penalties: Halfpenny (3) 2', 35', 40+1'	0	9th
29 May 2021	Ulster	A	(Note: Ulster Rugby returned several positive COVID-19 tests and were therefore unable to field a team. Scarlets were awarded four match points.)			6th
13 June 2021	Edinburgh	H	28–28	Tries: Hardy (2) 9' c, 64' c, Rogers 29' c, D. Hughes 73' c Conversions: D. Jones (4) 10, 30', 65, 74'	1,000	7th

=== Table ===
Pos	Team	Pld	W	D	L	F	A	PD	BP	Pts
6	(Ireland) Connacht	5	3	0	2	109	133	-24	2	14
7	(Wales) Scarlets	5	1	2	2	110	115	−5	3	13
8	(Wales) Ospreys	5	2	1	2	103	88	+15	3	11 (Note: Ospreys returned several positive COVID-19 tests and were therefore unable to field a team in their fixture against Benetton. Benetton were awarded four match points.)

== European Champions Cup ==
Due to the COVID-19 pandemic in Europe, only the first two pool games were played during this season with the remaining pool games being cancelled. A revised knockout stage commenced with a round of 16 consisting of the top eight teams from each pool.

=== Fixtures ===
Date	Opponents	H / A	Result F–A	Scorers	Attendance	Table position
12 December 2020	Bath	A	23–19	Tries: G. Davies 7' c, Hardy 64' c Conversions: Halfpenny (2) 8', 64'; Penalties: Halfpenny (3) 32', 46', 75'	2,000	5th
18 December 2020	Toulon	H	28–0 (Note: Toulon forfeited after a confirmed COVID-19 case at the Scarlets, and the Scarlets were awarded a bonus-point victory.)	Forfeit		5th
15 January 2021	Toulon	A				
23 January 2021	Bath	H				

=== Table ===
Pool A

Pos	Team	Pld	W	D	L	F	A	PD	BP	Pts
4	(France) Stade Rochelais	2	2	0	2	41	8	+33	1	9
5	(Wales) Scarlets	2	2	0	0	51	19	+32	1	9
6	(Scotland) Edinburgh	2	1	0	1	24	28	−4	1	5

=== Knockout stage ===
Date	Round	Opponents	H / A	Result F–A	Scorers	Attendance
4 April 2021	Round of 16	Sale Sharks	H	14–57	Tries: Owens 46' c, J. Morgan 76' c Conversions: Halfpenny (2/2) 47', 76'	0

== Statistics ==
(+ in the Apps column denotes substitute appearance, positions listed are the ones they have started a game in during the season)

Pos.	Name	Pro 14						European Champions Cup						Rainbow Cup						Total						Discipline	
Pos.	Name	Apps	Try	Con	Pen	Drop	Pts	Apps	Try	Con	Pen	Drop	Pts	Apps	Try	Con	Pen	Drop	Pts	Apps	Try	Con	Pen	Drop	Pts	Yellow card	Red card
FB	(Wales) Leigh Halfpenny	4	0	4	11	0	41	2	0	4	3	0	17	2	0	1	8	0	26	7	0	9	22	0	84	0	0
FB/WG	(Wales) Liam Williams	2	0	0	0	0	0	1	0	0	0	0	0	0	0	0	0	0	0	3	0	0	0	0	0	0	1
FB	(Wales) Johnny McNicholl	8	1	0	0	0	5	1	0	0	0	0	0	2	1	0	0	0	5	11	2	0	0	0	10	0	0
FB/WG	(Wales) Tom Rogers	5	1	0	0	0	5	0	0	0	0	0	0	4	1	0	0	0	5	9	2	0	0	0	10	0	0
WG	(Wales) Steff Evans	14	2	2	0	0	14	1	0	0	0	0	0	3	2	0	0	0	10	18	4	2	0	0	24	0	0
WG	(Wales) Ryan Conbeer	5	4	0	0	0	20	1	0	0	0	0	0	1	0	0	0	0	0	7	4	0	0	0	20	0	0
WG	(Wales) Tom Prydie	4	0	0	0	0	0	0	0	0	0	0	0	0	0	0	0	0	0	4	0	0	0	0	0	0	0
CE/WG	(Wales) Tyler Morgan	8+4	1	0	0	0	5	1	0	0	0	0	0	3	0	0	0	0	0	12+4	1	0	0	0	5	0	0
CE	(Wales) Jonathan Davies	5	1	0	0	0	5	0+2	0	0	0	0	0	3	0	0	0	0	0	7+2	1	0	0	0	5	0	0
CE	(Wales) Steffan Hughes	13+2	2	0	0	0	10	2	0	0	0	0	0	1+1	0	0	0	0	0	15+3	2	0	0	0	10	0	0
CE	(Wales) Johnny Williams	3+2	0	0	0	0	0	1	0	0	0	0	0	0	0	0	0	0	0	4+2	0	0	0	0	0	0	0
CE	(Australia) Paul Asquith	4+7	3	0	0	0	15	0	0	0	0	0	0	0+1	0	0	0	0	0	4+8	3	0	0	0	15	0	0
CE	(Wales) Joe Roberts	0	0	0	0	0	0	0	0	0	0	0	0	0+3	0	0	0	0	0	0+3	0	0	0	0	0	0	0
CE	(Wales) Ioan Nicholas	0	0	0	0	0	0	0	0	0	0	0	0	1	0	0	0	0	0	1	0	0	0	0	0	0	0
FH/FB	(Wales) Angus O'Brien	7+5	2	4	7	0	37	0+1	0	0	0	0	0	2+1	1	2	0	0	9	9+7	3	6	7	0	46	0	0
FH	(Wales) Dan Jones	10+3	0	12	11	0	57	2	0	0	0	0	0	1+1	0	2	0	0	4	13+4	0	14	11	0	61	0	0
FH	(Wales) Rhys Patchell	0+2	0	0	0	0	0	0	0	0	0	0	0	0	0	0	0	0	0	0+2	0	0	0	0	0	0	0
FH	(Wales) Sam Costelow	2+4	2	2	2	0	20	0+1	0	0	0	0	0	1+1	0	4	0	0	8	3+6	2	6	2	0	28	0	0
SH	(Wales) Gareth Davies	4+2	0	0	0	0	0	2	1	0	0	0	5	0	0	0	0	0	0	6+2	1	0	0	0	5	0	0
SH	(Wales) Kieran Hardy	2+4	0	0	0	0	0	0+1	1	0	0	0	5	3+1	2	0	0	0	10	5+6	3	0	0	0	15	1	0
SH	(Wales) Dane Blacker	10	6	0	0	0	30	0+1	0	0	0	0	0	1+2	3	0	0	0	15	11+3	9	0	0	0	45	0	0
SH	(England) Will Homer	0+8	1	0	0	0	5	0	0	0	0	0	0	0+1	0	0	0	0	0	0+9	1	0	0	0	5	0	0
N8/FL	(South Africa) Uzair Cassiem	7+5	0	0	0	0	0	0	0	0	0	0	0	2+1	0	0	0	0	0	9+6	0	0	0	0	0	2	0
N8/LK	(Tonga) Sione Kalamafoni	14	3	0	0	0	15	2	0	0	0	0	0	0	0	0	0	0	0	15	3	0	0	0	15	0	0
N8	(Wales) Carwyn Tuipulotu	0+1	0	0	0	0	0	0	0	0	0	0	0	0+1	0	0	0	0	0	0+2	0	0	0	0	0	0	0
FL/N8	(Australia) Ed Kennedy	4+6	0	0	0	0	0	0	0	0	0	0	0	1	0	0	0	0	0	5+6	0	0	0	0	0	0	0
FL	(Wales) Josh Macleod	4	0	0	0	0	0	0+1	0	0	0	0	0	0	0	0	0	0	0	4+1	0	0	0	0	0	0	0
FL	(Scotland) Blade Thomson	7+2	1	0	0	0	5	1	0	0	0	0	0	3	0	0	0	0	0	11+2	1	0	0	0	5	0	0
FL	(Wales) James Davies	0+2	0	0	0	0	0	0	0	0	0	0	0	0	0	0	0	0	0	0+2	0	0	0	0	0	0	0
FL	(Wales) Jac Morgan	9	2	0	0	0	10	2	1	0	0	0	5	3	0	0	0	0	0	14	3	0	0	0	15	0	0
FL	(Wales) Dan Davis	2+1	0	0	0	0	0	0	0	0	0	0	0	0	0	0	0	0	0	2+1	0	0	0	0	0	0	0
FL	(Wales) Aaron Shingler	2	1	0	0	0	5	1	0	0	0	0	0	2	0	0	0	0	0	5	1	0	0	0	5	1	0
FL	(Wales) Iestyn Rees	0	0	0	0	0	0	0	0	0	0	0	0	1+2	1	0	0	0	5	1+2	1	0	0	0	5	0	0
LK	(Tonga) Sam Lousi	10+1	0	0	0	0	0	2	0	0	0	0	0	0	0	0	0	0	0	12+1	0	0	0	0	0	0	1
LK	(Wales) Jake Ball	6	0	0	0	0	0	2	0	0	0	0	0	2	0	0	0	0	0	10	0	0	0	0	0	1	0
LK	(Wales) Lewis Rawlins	1+3	0	0	0	0	0	0	0	0	0	0	0	2+1	0	0	0	0	0	3+4	0	0	0	0	0	0	0
LK	(Fiji) Tevita Ratuva	2+7	0	0	0	0	0	0	0	0	0	0	0	0	0	0	0	0	0	2+7	0	0	0	0	0	1	0
LK	(Wales) Morgan Jones	8+1	0	0	0	0	0	0+1	0	0	0	0	0	2+1	0	0	0	0	0	10+3	0	0	0	0	0	1	1
LK	(Wales) Josh Helps	1+1	0	0	0	0	0	0	0	0	0	0	0	2	0	0	0	0	0	3+1	0	0	0	0	0	0	1
LK	(Wales) Jac Price	2+1	0	0	0	0	0	0	0	0	0	0	0	0+1	0	0	0	0	0	2+2	0	0	0	0	0	0	0
LK	(New Zealand) Danny Drake	1+2	0	0	0	0	0	0	0	0	0	0	0	0+1	0	0	0	0	0	1+3	0	0	0	0	0	0	0
HK	(Wales) Ken Owens	1+2	0	0	0	0	0	1	1	0	0	0	5	1+1	0	0	0	0	0	3+3	1	0	0	0	5	0	0
HK	(Wales) Ryan Elias	5+3	0	0	0	0	0	1+1	0	0	0	0	0	3+1	0	0	0	0	0	9+5	0	0	0	0	0	0	0
HK	(Wales) Marc Jones	5+3	0	0	0	0	0	0+1	0	0	0	0	0	0	0	0	0	0	0	5+4	0	0	0	0	0	1	0
HK	(Wales) Taylor Davies	5+4	0	0	0	0	0	0	0	0	0	0	0	0	0	0	0	0	0	5+4	0	0	0	0	0	0	0
HK	(Wales) Dom Booth	0+1	0	0	0	0	0	0	0	0	0	0	0	0	0	0	0	0	0	0+1	0	0	0	0	0	0	0
HK	(Wales) Dafydd Hughes	0+2	0	0	0	0	0	0	0	0	0	0	0	0+2	1	0	0	0	5	0+4	1	0	0	0	5	0	0
PR	(Wales) Wyn Jones	5	0	0	0	0	0	2	0	0	0	0	0	0	0	0	0	0	0	7	0	0	0	0	0	0	0
PR	(South Africa) Werner Kruger	1+7	0	0	0	0	0	0	0	0	0	0	0	0+2	0	0	0	0	0	1+9	0	0	0	0	0	1	0
PR	(Scotland) Javan Sebastian	10+4	1	0	0	0	5	0+2	0	0	0	0	0	0+1	0	0	0	0	0	10+7	1	0	0	0	5	0	0
PR	(Wales) Phil Price	6+7	1	0	0	0	5	0	0	0	0	0	0	0	0	0	0	0	0	6+7	1	0	0	0	5	0	0
PR	(Wales) Samson Lee	1	1	0	0	0	5	1	0	0	0	0	0	0+1	0	0	0	0	0	2+1	1	0	0	0	5	0	0
PR	(Wales) Rob Evans	3+2	0	0	0	0	0	0+1	0	0	0	0	0	3	0	0	0	0	0	6+3	0	0	0	0	0	0	0
PR	(South Africa) Pieter Scholtz	4+3	0	0	0	0	0	1	0	0	0	0	0	1	0	0	0	0	0	6+3	0	0	0	0	0	1	0
PR	(Wales) Kemsley Mathias	0+5	0	0	0	0	0	0	0	0	0	0	0	0	0	0	0	0	0	0+5	0	0	0	0	0	0	0
PR	(Wales) Steffan Thomas	2+1	0	0	0	0	0	0+1	0	0	0	0	0	1+3	0	0	0	0	0	3+5	0	0	0	0	0	0	0
PR	(Wales) Alex Jeffries	0+2	0	0	0	0	0	0	0	0	0	0	0	3	1	0	0	0	5	3+2	1	0	0	0	5	0	0

Stats correct as of match played 13 June 2021

== Transfers ==
=== In ===
Date confirmed	Pos.	Name	From	Ref.
28 September 2020	WG	(Wales) Aled Brew	(England) Bath	
13 November 2020	PR	(South Africa) Pieter Scholtz	(South Africa) Southern Kings	

=== Out ===
Date confirmed	Pos.	Name	To	Ref.
22 December 2020	WG	(Wales) Aled Brew	Retired	
10 February 2021	PR	(Australia) Dylan Evans	(Scotland) Glasgow Warriors (loan)	
1 March 2021	CE	(Wales) Joe Roberts	(England) Ampthill (loan)	
3 March 2021	HK	(Wales) Shaun Evans	(England) Nottingham RFC (loan)	
3 March 2021	LK	(Wales) Jac Price	(England) Nottingham RFC (loan)	
3 March 2021	PR	(Wales) Harri O'Connor	(England) Nottingham RFC (loan)	
23 March 2021	LK	(Fiji) Tevita Ratuva	(France) Brive	
2 April 2021	HK	(Wales) Taylor Davies	(Wales) Dragons (loan)	
16 April 2021	WG	(Wales) Harri Doel	(England) Worcester Warriors (loan)	
