= 2021–22 Scarlets season =

Scarlets
- 2021–22 season
- Head coach: Dwayne Peel
- Chairman: Simon Muderack
- United Rugby Championship: 10th (Welsh Shield: 2nd)
- European Rugby Champions Cup: Pool stage, 12th
- Top try scorer: League: Johnny McNicholl (8); All: Johnny McNicholl (9)
- Top points scorer: League: Sam Costelow (94); All: Sam Costelow (94)
- Highest home attendance: 7,824 v Lions, 1 October 2021
- Lowest home attendance: 5,566 v Connacht, 19 February 2022
- Average home attendance: 6,688

The 2021–22 season was the 18th in the history of the Scarlets, a Welsh regional rugby union side based in Llanelli, Carmarthenshire. In this season, they competed in the inaugural United Rugby Championship and the Champions Cup. It was Dwayne Peel's first season as head coach of the region, following the departure of his predecessor Glenn Delaney.

== Friendlies ==
| Date | Opponents | H / A | Result F–A | Scorers | Attendance |
|---|---|---|---|---|---|
| 4 September 2021 | Nottingham | H | 55–21 | Tries: Baldwin 20' m, Conbeer (3) 30' c, 53' m, 75' c, Sh. Evans 38' c, Costelow 49' c, A. Hughes (2) 60' m, 66'c, St. Evans 72' m Conversions: D. Jones (5) 31', 39', 49', 67', 76' | |
| 9 September 2021 | Leicester Tigers | A | 29–24 | Tries: Rogers 5' m, St. Evans 52' c, S. Hughes 57' c, Conbeer 70' c Conversions: D. Jones (3) 53', 57', 71'; Penalty: Costelow 32' | |

== United Rugby Championship ==
=== Fixtures ===
| Date | Opponents | H / A | Result F–A | Scorers | Attendance | Table position |
|---|---|---|---|---|---|---|
| 25 September 2021 | Edinburgh | A | 22–26 | Tries: St. Evans 11' m, Hardy 50' c, McNicholl 65' c Conversions: D. Jones 51', Costelow 66'; Penalty: D. Jones 37' | 5,530 | 11th |
| 1 October 2021 | Lions | H | 36–13 | Tries: R. Evans 4' c, Rogers (2) 18' c, 69' m, St. Evans 78' m Conversions: Costelow (2) 5', 19'; Penalties: Costelow (4) 28', 38', 62', 66' | 7,824 | 8th |
| 10 October 2021 | Munster | H | 13–43 | Try: McNicholl 28' c Conversion: Costelow 29'; Penalties: Costelow (2) 16', 33' | 6,336 | 11th |
| 16 October 2021 | Leinster | A | 15–50 | Tries: McNicholl 17' m, Lezana 48' c Conversion: D. Jones 49'; Penalty: Costelow 1' | 14,055 | 11th |
| 22 October 2021 | Benetton | H | 34–28 | Tries: R. Evans 16' c, Blacker (2) 18' c, 64' c M. Jones 54' c Conversions: D. Jones (4) 17', 19', 55', 64'; Penalties: D. Jones 49', Costelow 70' | 6,074 | 10th |
| 1 January 2022 | Ospreys | H | 22–19 | Tries: G. Davies 9' c, St. Evans 52' m, McNicholl 65' m, 77' m Conversion: D. Jones 10' | 0 | 9th |
| 28 January 2022 | Ulster | A | 15–27 | Tries: Lee 28' c, Mathias 61' m Conversion: D. Jones 29'; Penalty: D. Jones 9' | 11,275 | 11th |
| 19 February 2022 | Connacht | H | 23–29 | Tries: J. Williams 19' c, Penalty try 63'; Conversion: D. Jones 19'; Penalties: D. Jones 4', 35', Patchell 75' | 5,566 | 13th |
| 5 March 2022 | Glasgow Warriors | H | 35–10 | Tries: St. Evans 38' c, S. Williams 41' c, G. Davies 57' c, Kalamafoni 64' c, Conbeer 72' c Conversions: Patchell (3) 39', 42', 58', St. Evans 64', Sam Costelow 73' | 6,006 | 11th |
| 11 March 2022 | Sharks | A | 20–47 | Tries: Shingler 46' c, St. Evans 74' c Conversions: Costelow 46', D. Jones 74'; Penalties: Costelow (2) 8', 15' | 6,456 | |
| 18 March 2022 | Bulls | A | 12–57 | Tries: Kalamafoni 31' c, Rob Evans 80' m Conversion: Rhys Patchell 33' | 5,346 | |
| 26 March 2022 | Zebre | A | 41–24 | Tries: Baldwin 21' c, Conbeer 28' c, McNicholl 33' c, Lousi 50' m, Lezana 60' c, Tuipulotu 71' m Conversions: Patchell (3) 22', 30', 33', Costelow 61'; Penalty: Patchell 14' | 3,456 | 11th |
| 2 April 2022 | Cardiff | H | 35–20 | Tries: Costelow 21' c, McNicholl (2) 31' m, 51' c, Kalamafoni 44' c Conversions: Costelow (3) 21', 44', 52'; Penalties: Costelow (3) 6', 49', 73' | 7,078 | 10th |
| 9 April 2022 | Cardiff | A | 49–14 | Tries: Shingler 40' c, L. Williams (2) 42' c, 72' c, Penalty try 53', Davis 58' c, Rogers 75' c, Jo. Davies 77' c Conversions: Costelow (4) 40+2', 44', 59', 73', O'Brien (2) 76', 78' | 9,232 | 9th |
| 16 April 2022 | Dragons | H | 27–38 | Tries: Kalamafoni 25' c, L. Williams 40+1' m, J. Williams 53' c, Hardy 59' m Conversions: Costelow 26', O'Brien 54'; Penalty: Costelow 16' | 7,123 | 9th |
| 23 April 2022 | Dragons | A | 38–19 | Tries: Lousi 11' m, O'Brien (2) 14' c, 79' c, Elias 28' m, R. Evans 65' c, Baldwin 75'; Conversions: Patchell (4) 15', 66', 76', 80+1' | 5,567 | 9th |
| 30 April 2022 | Ospreys | A | 36–54 | Tries: G. Davies 19' c, Conbeer (3) 23' c, 33' c, 74' m, Hardy 71' c Conversions: Costelow (3) 20', 24', 34', Patchell 71'; Penalty: Costelow 7' | 10,141 | 10th |
| 21 May 2022 | Stormers | H | 21–26 | Tries: J. Williams 6' c, Conbeer 70' m Conversion: Costelow 7'; Penalties: Costelow (3) 3', 16', 27' | 7,386 | 10th |

=== Tables ===
Overall

| Pos | Team | Pld | W | D | L | F | A | PD | BP | Pts |
|---|---|---|---|---|---|---|---|---|---|---|
| 9 | (Wales) Ospreys | 18 | 10 | 0 | 8 | 422 | 474 | −52 | 6 | 46 |
| 10 | (Wales) Scarlets | 18 | 8 | 0 | 10 | 494 | 534 | −40 | 13 | 45 |
| 11 | (Ireland) Connacht | 18 | 9 | 0 | 9 | 399 | 502 | −103 | 5 | 41 |

Welsh Shield

| Pos | Team | Pld | W | D | L | F | A | PD | BP | Pts |
|---|---|---|---|---|---|---|---|---|---|---|
| 1 | (Wales) Ospreys | 18 | 10 | 0 | 8 | 422 | 474 | –52 | 6 | 46 |
| 2 | (Wales) Scarlets | 18 | 8 | 0 | 10 | 494 | 534 | –40 | 13 | 45 |
| 3 | (Wales) Cardiff | 18 | 7 | 0 | 11 | 369 | 577 | –208 | 4 | 32 |
| 4 | (Wales) Dragons | 18 | 2 | 1 | 15 | 305 | 547 | –242 | 9 | 19 |

== European Rugby Champions Cup ==
=== Fixtures ===
| Date | Opponents | H / A | Result F–A | Scorers | Attendance | Table position |
|---|---|---|---|---|---|---|
| 11 December 2021 | Bristol | A | 0–28 (Note: Due to the Scarlets squad having to isolate following trip to South Africa, Scarlets had to forfeit the match on safety grounds. This meant that Bristol were awarded 5 match points and a 28–0 victory.) | | | |
| 19 December 2021 | Bordeaux-Bègles | H | 0–0 (Note: Initially postponed (with the intent to reschedule) due to travel restrictions between UK and France, but later cancelled with a 0–0 draw verdict and 2 match points to each team.) | | | |
| 16 January 2022 | Bordeaux-Bègles | A | 10–45 | Tries: L. Williams 52' m, G. Davies 61' m | 5,000 | |
| 22 January 2022 | Bristol | H | 21–52 | Tries: Elias 22' c, McNicholl 59' m Conversion: Patchell 23'; Penalties: Patchell 6', 28', 43' | 7,500 | 12th |

=== Table ===
| Pos | Team | Pld | W | D | L | F | A | PD | BP | Pts |
|---|---|---|---|---|---|---|---|---|---|---|
| 10 | (England) Wasps | 4 | 1 | 1 | 2 | 51 | 102 | −51 | 0 | 6 |
| 11 | (France) Castres | 4 | 0 | 0 | 4 | 77 | 91 | −14 | 5 | 5 |
| 12 | (Wales) Scarlets | 4 | 0 | 1 | 3 | 31 | 125 | −94 | 0 | 2 |

== Statistics ==
(+ in the Apps column denotes substitute appearance, positions listed are the ones they have started a game in during the season)

| Pos. | Name | United Rugby Championship | | | | | | European Champions Cup | | | | | | Total | | | | | | Discipline | |
| Pos. | Name | Apps | Try | Con | Pen | Drop | Pts | Apps | Try | Con | Pen | Drop | Pts | Apps | Try | Con | Pen | Drop | Pts | Yellow card | Red card |
|---|---|---|---|---|---|---|---|---|---|---|---|---|---|---|---|---|---|---|---|---|---|
| FB | (Wales) Leigh Halfpenny | 0 | 0 | 0 | 0 | 0 | 0 | 0 | 0 | 0 | 0 | 0 | 0 | 0 | 0 | 0 | 0 | 0 | 0 | 0 | 0 |
| FB/WG | (Wales) Tomi Lewis | 0 | 0 | 0 | 0 | 0 | 0 | 0 | 0 | 0 | 0 | 0 | 0 | 0 | 0 | 0 | 0 | 0 | 0 | 0 | 0 |
| FB/WG | (Wales) Liam Williams | 4 | 3 | 0 | 0 | 0 | 15 | 2 | 1 | 0 | 0 | 0 | 5 | 6 | 4 | 0 | 0 | 0 | 20 | 1 | 0 |
| WG | (Wales) Ryan Conbeer | 11 | 6 | 0 | 0 | 0 | 30 | 1 | 0 | 0 | 0 | 0 | 0 | 12 | 6 | 0 | 0 | 0 | 30 | 0 | 0 |
| WG | (Wales) Steff Evans | 10+2 | 5 | 1 | 0 | 0 | 27 | 1 | 0 | 0 | 0 | 0 | 0 | 11+2 | 5 | 1 | 0 | 0 | 27 | 2 | 0 |
| WG/FB | (Wales) Johnny McNicholl | 8 | 8 | 0 | 0 | 0 | 40 | 2 | 1 | 0 | 0 | 0 | 5 | 10 | 9 | 0 | 0 | 0 | 45 | 1 | 0 |
| WG/FB | (Wales) Tom Rogers | 9+2 | 3 | 0 | 0 | 0 | 15 | 0 | 0 | 0 | 0 | 0 | 0 | 9+2 | 3 | 0 | 0 | 0 | 15 | 0 | 0 |
| CE/WG | (Wales) Corey Baldwin | 5 | 2 | 0 | 0 | 0 | 10 | 0 | 0 | 0 | 0 | 0 | 0 | 5 | 2 | 0 | 0 | 0 | 10 | 2 | 0 |
| CE | (Wales) Jonathan Davies | 9+1 | 1 | 0 | 0 | 0 | 5 | 2 | 0 | 0 | 0 | 0 | 0 | 11+1 | 1 | 0 | 0 | 0 | 5 | 1 | 0 |
| CE | (Wales) Steffan Hughes | 3 | 0 | 0 | 0 | 0 | 0 | 0 | 0 | 0 | 0 | 0 | 0 | 3 | 0 | 0 | 0 | 0 | 0 | 0 | 0 |
| CE | (Wales) Tyler Morgan | 1+1 | 0 | 0 | 0 | 0 | 0 | 0 | 0 | 0 | 0 | 0 | 0 | 1+1 | 0 | 0 | 0 | 0 | 0 | 0 | 0 |
| CE/FB | (Wales) Ioan Nicholas | 5+2 | 0 | 0 | 0 | 0 | 0 | 0+2 | 0 | 0 | 0 | 0 | 0 | 5+4 | 0 | 0 | 0 | 0 | 0 | 1 | 0 |
| CE | (Wales) Joe Roberts | 2+5 | 0 | 0 | 0 | 0 | 0 | 0 | 0 | 0 | 0 | 0 | 0 | 2+5 | 0 | 0 | 0 | 0 | 0 | 0 | 0 |
| CE | (Wales) Johnny Williams | 10+3 | 3 | 0 | 0 | 0 | 15 | 0 | 0 | 0 | 0 | 0 | 0 | 10+3 | 3 | 0 | 0 | 0 | 15 | 0 | 0 |
| CE | (Wales) Scott Williams | 11 | 1 | 0 | 0 | 0 | 5 | 2 | 0 | 0 | 0 | 0 | 0 | 13 | 1 | 0 | 0 | 0 | 5 | 0 | 0 |
| FH | (Wales) Sam Costelow | 9+5 | 1 | 19 | 17 | 0 | 94 | 1+1 | 0 | 0 | 0 | 0 | 0 | 10+6 | 1 | 19 | 17 | 0 | 94 | 0 | 0 |
| FH | (Wales) Dan Jones | 5+5 | 0 | 9 | 5 | 0 | 33 | 0 | 0 | 0 | 0 | 0 | 0 | 5+5 | 0 | 9 | 5 | 0 | 33 | 0 | 0 |
| FH/FB | (Wales) Angus O'Brien | 2+3 | 2 | 4 | 1 | 0 | 21 | 0 | 0 | 0 | 0 | 0 | 0 | 2+3 | 2 | 4 | 1 | 0 | 21 | 0 | 0 |
| FH | (Wales) Rhys Patchell | 4+4 | 0 | 12 | 2 | 0 | 30 | 1+1 | 0 | 1 | 3 | 0 | 11 | 5+5 | 0 | 13 | 5 | 0 | 41 | 0 | 0 |
| SH | (Wales) Dane Blacker | 5+6 | 2 | 0 | 0 | 0 | 10 | 1+1 | 0 | 0 | 0 | 0 | 0 | 6+7 | 2 | 0 | 0 | 0 | 10 | 0 | 0 |
| SH | (Wales) Gareth Davies | 10 | 3 | 0 | 0 | 0 | 15 | 1 | 1 | 0 | 0 | 0 | 5 | 11 | 4 | 0 | 0 | 0 | 20 | 0 | 0 |
| SH | (Wales) Luke Davies | 0+1 | 0 | 0 | 0 | 0 | 0 | 0 | 0 | 0 | 0 | 0 | 0 | 0+1 | 0 | 0 | 0 | 0 | 0 | 0 | 0 |
| SH | (Wales) Kieran Hardy | 3+9 | 3 | 0 | 0 | 0 | 15 | 0+1 | 0 | 0 | 0 | 0 | 0 | 3+10 | 3 | 0 | 0 | 0 | 15 | 0 | 0 |
| SH | (Wales) Archie Hughes | 0+2 | 0 | 0 | 0 | 0 | 0 | 0 | 0 | 0 | 0 | 0 | 0 | 0+2 | 0 | 0 | 0 | 0 | 0 | 0 | 0 |
| N8/FL | (Tonga) Sione Kalamafoni | 15+1 | 4 | 0 | 0 | 0 | 20 | 2 | 0 | 0 | 0 | 0 | 0 | 17+1 | 4 | 0 | 0 | 0 | 20 | 0 | 1 |
| N8 | (Wales) Carwyn Tuipulotu | 1+6 | 1 | 0 | 0 | 0 | 5 | 1+1 | 0 | 0 | 0 | 0 | 0 | 2+7 | 1 | 0 | 0 | 0 | 5 | 0 | 0 |
| FL | (Wales) Dan Davis | 6 | 1 | 0 | 0 | 0 | 5 | 0 | 0 | 0 | 0 | 0 | 0 | 6 | 1 | 0 | 0 | 0 | 5 | 0 | 0 |
| FL/HK | (Wales) Shaun Evans | 7+7 | 0 | 0 | 0 | 0 | 0 | 1 | 0 | 0 | 0 | 0 | 0 | 8+7 | 0 | 0 | 0 | 0 | 0 | 0 | 0 |
| FL | (Argentina) Tomas Lezana | 7+2 | 2 | 0 | 0 | 0 | 10 | 1 | 0 | 0 | 0 | 0 | 0 | 8+2 | 2 | 0 | 0 | 0 | 10 | 0 | 0 |
| FL | (Wales) Josh Macleod | 4+2 | 0 | 0 | 0 | 0 | 0 | 0 | 0 | 0 | 0 | 0 | 0 | 4+2 | 0 | 0 | 0 | 0 | 0 | 0 | 0 |
| FL | (Wales) Tom Phillips | 0+1 | 0 | 0 | 0 | 0 | 0 | 0 | 0 | 0 | 0 | 0 | 0 | 0+1 | 0 | 0 | 0 | 0 | 0 | 0 | 0 |
| FL | (Wales) Iestyn Rees | 0+1 | 0 | 0 | 0 | 0 | 0 | 0+1 | 0 | 0 | 0 | 0 | 0 | 0+2 | 0 | 0 | 0 | 0 | 0 | 0 | 0 |
| FL/LK | (Wales) Aaron Shingler | 9+6 | 2 | 0 | 0 | 0 | 10 | 1 | 0 | 0 | 0 | 0 | 0 | 10+6 | 2 | 0 | 0 | 0 | 10 | 0 | 0 |
| FL/N8 | (Scotland) Blade Thomson | 11+1 | 0 | 0 | 0 | 0 | 0 | 0 | 0 | 0 | 0 | 0 | 0 | 11+1 | 0 | 0 | 0 | 0 | 0 | 0 | 0 |
| LK | (Wales) Lloyd Ashley | 2+1 | 0 | 0 | 0 | 0 | 0 | 0 | 0 | 0 | 0 | 0 | 0 | 2+1 | 0 | 0 | 0 | 0 | 0 | 0 | 0 |
| LK | (Wales) Josh Helps | 0+1 | 0 | 0 | 0 | 0 | 0 | 0+1 | 0 | 0 | 0 | 0 | 0 | 0+2 | 0 | 0 | 0 | 0 | 0 | 0 | 0 |
| LK | (Wales) Morgan Jones | 3+8 | 0 | 0 | 0 | 0 | 0 | 2 | 0 | 0 | 0 | 0 | 0 | 5+8 | 0 | 0 | 0 | 0 | 0 | 0 | 0 |
| LK | (Tonga) Sam Lousi | 13 | 2 | 0 | 0 | 0 | 10 | 2 | 0 | 0 | 0 | 0 | 0 | 15 | 2 | 0 | 0 | 0 | 10 | 0 | 0 |
| LK | (Wales) Jac Price | 12+1 | 0 | 0 | 0 | 0 | 0 | 0+1 | 0 | 0 | 0 | 0 | 0 | 12+1 | 0 | 0 | 0 | 0 | 0 | 0 | 0 |
| LK | (England) Tom Price | 4+1 | 0 | 0 | 0 | 0 | 0 | 0 | 0 | 0 | 0 | 0 | 0 | 4+1 | 0 | 0 | 0 | 0 | 0 | 0 | 0 |
| LK | (Wales) Lewis Rawlins | 0 | 0 | 0 | 0 | 0 | 0 | 0 | 0 | 0 | 0 | 0 | 0 | 0 | 0 | 0 | 0 | 0 | 0 | 0 | 0 |
| HK | (Wales) Dom Booth | 0 | 0 | 0 | 0 | 0 | 0 | 0 | 0 | 0 | 0 | 0 | 0 | 0 | 0 | 0 | 0 | 0 | 0 | 0 | 0 |
| HK | (Wales) Ryan Elias | 6+3 | 1 | 0 | 0 | 0 | 5 | 2 | 1 | 0 | 0 | 0 | 5 | 8+3 | 2 | 0 | 0 | 0 | 10 | 1 | 0 |
| HK | (Wales) Dafydd Hughes | 5+6 | 0 | 0 | 0 | 0 | 0 | 0 | 0 | 0 | 0 | 0 | 0 | 5+6 | 0 | 0 | 0 | 0 | 0 | 0 | 0 |
| HK | (Wales) Marc Jones | 1+5 | 0 | 0 | 0 | 0 | 0 | 0+2 | 0 | 0 | 0 | 0 | 0 | 1+7 | 0 | 0 | 0 | 0 | 0 | 0 | 0 |
| HK | (Wales) Lewis Morgan | 0+1 | 0 | 0 | 0 | 0 | 0 | 0 | 0 | 0 | 0 | 0 | 0 | 0+1 | 0 | 0 | 0 | 0 | 0 | 0 | 0 |
| HK | (Wales) Ken Owens | 2 | 0 | 0 | 0 | 0 | 0 | 0 | 0 | 0 | 0 | 0 | 0 | 2 | 0 | 0 | 0 | 0 | 0 | 0 | 0 |
| PR | (Wales) Rob Evans | 5+6 | 4 | 0 | 0 | 0 | 20 | 0 | 0 | 0 | 0 | 0 | 0 | 5+6 | 4 | 0 | 0 | 0 | 20 | 0 | 0 |
| PR | (Wales) WillGriff John | 2+6 | 0 | 0 | 0 | 0 | 0 | 0 | 0 | 0 | 0 | 0 | 0 | 2+6 | 0 | 0 | 0 | 0 | 0 | 0 | 0 |
| PR | (Wales) Wyn Jones | 1+3 | 0 | 0 | 0 | 0 | 0 | 2 | 0 | 0 | 0 | 0 | 0 | 3+3 | 0 | 0 | 0 | 0 | 0 | 0 | 0 |
| PR | (Wales) Samson Lee | 7+2 | 1 | 0 | 0 | 0 | 5 | 2 | 0 | 0 | 0 | 0 | 0 | 9+2 | 1 | 0 | 0 | 0 | 5 | 0 | 0 |
| PR | (Wales) Kemsley Mathias | 2+3 | 1 | 0 | 0 | 0 | 5 | 0 | 0 | 0 | 0 | 0 | 0 | 2+3 | 1 | 0 | 0 | 0 | 5 | 1 | 0 |
| PR | (Wales) Harri O'Connor | 1+7 | 0 | 0 | 0 | 0 | 0 | 0+1 | 0 | 0 | 0 | 0 | 0 | 1+8 | 0 | 0 | 0 | 0 | 0 | 0 | 0 |
| PR | (Wales) Phil Price | 0+5 | 0 | 0 | 0 | 0 | 0 | 0+2 | 0 | 0 | 0 | 0 | 0 | 0+7 | 0 | 0 | 0 | 0 | 0 | 1 | 0 |
| PR | (Scotland) Javan Sebastian | 8+3 | 0 | 0 | 0 | 0 | 0 | 0+1 | 0 | 0 | 0 | 0 | 0 | 8+4 | 0 | 0 | 0 | 0 | 0 | 0 | 0 |
| PR | (Wales) Steffan Thomas | 10+1 | 0 | 0 | 0 | 0 | 0 | 0 | 0 | 0 | 0 | 0 | 0 | 10+1 | 0 | 0 | 0 | 0 | 0 | 1 | 0 |

Stats correct as of match played 21 May 2022

== Transfers ==
=== In ===
| Date confirmed | Pos. | Name | From | Ref. |
|---|---|---|---|---|
| 2 February 2021 | PR | (Wales) WillGriff John | (England) Sale Sharks | |
| 11 May 2021 | FL | (Argentina) Tomas Lezana | (Australia) Western Force | |
| 6 July 2021 | CE | (Wales) Scott Williams | (Wales) Ospreys | |
| 13 July 2021 | LK | (England) Tom Price | (England) Exeter Chiefs | |
| 3 August 2021 | CE | (Wales) Corey Baldwin | (England) Exeter Chiefs | |
| 5 October 2021 | LK | (Wales) Lloyd Ashley | (Wales) Ospreys (loan) | |

=== Out ===
| Date confirmed | Pos. | Name | To | Ref. |
|---|---|---|---|---|
| 29 December 2020 | LK | (Wales) Jake Ball | (Japan) NEC Green Rockets | |
| 1 February 2021 | PR | (South Africa) Werner Kruger | Retired | |
| 6 March 2021 | FL | (Wales) Jac Morgan | (Wales) Ospreys | |
| 3 April 2021 | N8 | (South Africa) Uzair Cassiem | (France) Bayonne | |
| 8 April 2021 | CE | (Wales) Osian Knott | (Wales) Ospreys | |
| 29 April 2021 | WG | (Wales) Harri Doel | (England) Worcester Warriors | |
| 17 May 2021 | CE | (Australia) Paul Asquith | Unattached | |
| 17 May 2021 | PR | (Australia) Dylan Evans | Unattached | |
| 17 May 2021 | FL | (Wales) Tom Phillips | Unattached | |
| 17 May 2021 | FL | (Wales) Joe Miles | (Wales) Pontypridd | |
| 17 May 2021 | PR | (South Africa) Pieter Scholtz | (England) Wasps | |
| 17 May 2021 | SH | (England) Will Homer | (England) Richmond | |
| 17 May 2021 | FL | (Australia) Ed Kennedy | (Australia) Brumbies | |
| 30 July 2021 | LK | (New Zealand) Danny Drake | (England) Doncaster Knights | |
| 1 November 2021 | WG | (Wales) Tom Prydie | (England) Bath | |
| 7 February 2022 | PR | (Wales) Alex Jeffries | (England) Saracens (loan) | |
| 1 April 2022 | FL | (Wales) James Davies | Retired | |
