= 2018–19 Scarlets season =

Scarlets
- 2018–19 season
- Head coach: Wayne Pivac
- Chief executive: Darran Phillips
- Chairman: Nigel Short
- Pro 14: 4th, Conference B
- European Rugby Champions Cup: 3rd, Pool 4
- Top try scorer: League: Johnny McNicholl (11); All: Johnny McNicholl (15)
- Top points scorer: League: Leigh Halfpenny (78); All: Leigh Halfpenny (93)
- Highest home attendance: 12,012 vs. Ospreys (6 October 2018)
- Lowest home attendance: 7,180 vs. Benetton Rugby (15 September 2018)
- Average home attendance: 8,317

The 2018–19 season was the 15th season in the history of the Scarlets, a Welsh regional rugby union side based in Llanelli, Carmarthenshire. In this season, they competed in the Pro14 and the European Rugby Champions Cup. This season, Welsh internationals Scott Williams and Aled Davies, Scottish international John Barclay and Irishman Tadhg Beirne were high-profile departures, while new recruits included internationals Kieron Fonotia, Uzair Cassiem and Sam Hidalgo-Clyne.

== Pre-season and friendlies ==
Date	Opponents	H / A	Result F–A	Scorers	Attendance
18 August 2018	Bristol Bears	H	28–19	Tries: Blommetjies (2), T. Lewis, Penalty try Conversions: D. Jones (3)	
24 August 2018	Bath	A	12–45	Tries: Patchell, Kruger; Conversion: Halfpenny	

== Pro 14 ==
=== Fixtures ===
Date	Opponents	H / A	Result F–A	Scorers	Attendance	Table position
1 September 2018	Ulster	A	13–15	Try: Patchell 7' c Conversion: Patchell 8'; Penalties: D. Jones (2) 55', 62'	11,822	3rd
8 September 2018	Leinster	H	23–21	Tries: Owens 11' c, G. Davies 68' c Conversions: Halfpenny (2) 12', 69'; Penalties: Halfpenny (3) 34', 50', 63'	7,258	5th
15 September 2018	Benetton Rugby	H	38–29	Tries: G. Davies (2) 4' c, 34' m, Fonotia 11' m, McNicholl 59' c, Kennedy 63' c, Prydie 80' c Conversions: Halfpenny (4) 4', 60', 64', 80+2'	7,180	1st
22 September 2018	Connacht	A	20–33	Tries: McNicholl 29' c, Prydie 72' c Conversions: Halfpenny (2) 29', 73'; Penalties: Halfpenny (2) 9', 20'	5,839	3rd
29 September 2018	Southern Kings	H	54–14	Tries: Jo. Davies (2) 9' c, 24' c, Asquith 15' c, Nicholas 42' c, D. Davis 58' c, Gardiner 65' m, S. Evans 72' c, Hardy 80' c Conversions: Patchell (5) 10', 16', 24', 43', 59', O'Brien (2) 74', 80+1'	7,529	2nd
6 October 2018	Ospreys	H	20–17	Tries: McNicholl 15' c, Patchell 56' c Conversions: Halfpenny (2) 16', 57'; Penalties: Halfpenny 40+2', 50'	12,012	2nd
26 October 2018	Southern Kings	A	41–34	Tries: D. Hughes 27' c, Boyde 39' m, Nicholas 41' c, Kruger 63' c, Hardy 72' c, T. Davies 77' m Conversions: D. Jones (4) 28', 42', 63', 73'; Penalty: D. Jones 16'	2,473	2nd
2 November 2018	Edinburgh	A	21–31	Tries: M. Williams 14' c, Asquith 38' c, McNicholl 49' c Conversions: D. Jones (3) 15', 39', 50'	5,037	2nd
23 November 2018	Ulster	H	29–12	Tries: Kruger 25' c, Hardy 36' c, Fonotia 39' m, Prydie 60' c Conversions: D. Jones (3) 26', 36', 62'; Penalty: D. Jones 18'	7,788	2nd
1 December 2018	Glasgow Warriors	A	20–29	Tries: Jo. Davies 46' m, S. Evans 68' m, Blommetjies 74' c Conversion: Patchell 76'; Penalty: Patchell 6'	7,351	2nd
22 December 2018	Ospreys	A	12–19	Penalties: Patchell (3) 5', 10', 26', D. Jones 71'	13,251	2nd
29 December 2018	Cardiff Blues	H	5–34	Try: McNicholl 11' m	10,622	4th
5 January 2019	Dragons	H	22–13	Tries: Nicholas 56' m, Hidalgo-Clyne 74' m Penalties: D. Jones (4) 3', 11', 37', 40+1	8,167	4th
25 January 2019	Leinster	A	17–22	Tries: Hardy (2) 51' c, 73' c Conversions: D. Jones 52', 74'; Penalty: D. Jones 59'	15,007	4th
16 February 2019	Benetton Rugby	A	19–25	Tries: Hardy 18' c', McNicholl (2) 35' m, 57' c Conversions: D. Jones 20', Patchell 58'	3,100	5th
24 February 2019	Cheetahs	H	43–21	Tries: Cassiem 2' c, McNicholl 8' c, Fonotia 12' c, Macleod 19', Wyn Jones 42' c, Asquith 68' m Conversions: D. Jones 3', Halfpenny (4) 9', 13', 20', 43'; Penalty: Halfpenny 55'	7,200	5th
2 March 2019	Munster	H	10–6	Try: Nicholas 11' c Conversion: Halfpenny 12'; Penalty: Halfpenny48'	8,032	3rd
22 March 2019	Cardiff Blues	A	17–41	Tries: R. Evans (2) 53' c, 66' m, Nicholas 77'; Conversion: Halfpenny 54'	12,000	5th
6 April 2019	Edinburgh	H	12–20	Tries: G. Davies 10' c, Jo. Davies 24' m Conversion: Halfpenny 11'	8,733	5th
13 April 2019	Zebre	H	42–0	Tries: Cassiem (2) 12' c, 72' c, Parkes 35' c, McNicholl 59' c, Hardy 74' c, Nicholas 76' c Conversions: Halfpenny (6) 13', 36', 60', 72', 75', 76'	8,356	5th
27 April 2019	Dragons	A	32-34	Tries: Nicholas 18' c, McNicholl (2) 25' m, 63' c, G. Davies 29' m, Jo. Davies 60' m Conversions: Halfpenny (2) 9', 65'; Penalty: Halfpenny 72'	51,297	4th

==== Champions Cup play-off ====
Date	Opponents	H / A	Result F–A	Scorers	Attendance
18 May 2019	Ospreys	A	10-21	Try: Jo. Davies 33' c Conversion: Halfpenny 35'; Penalty: Halfpenny 13'	8,489

=== Table ===
Conference B

Pos	Team	Pld	W	D	L	F	A	PD	BP	Pts
3	(Italy) Benetton	21	11	2	8	474	431	+43	9	57
4	(Wales) Scarlets	21	10	0	11	510	470	+40	12	52
5	(Scotland) Edinburgh	21	10	0	11	431	436	−5	11	51

== Rugby Champions Cup ==
=== Fixtures ===
Date	Opponents	H / A	Result F–A	Scorers	Attendance	Table position
13 October 2018	Racing 92	H	13–14	Tries: G. Davies 52' m, McNicholl 57' m Penalty: Halfpenny 9'	8,064	3rd
19 October 2018	Leicester Tigers	A	27-45	Tries: G. Davies 14' c, S. Evans 52' c, Thomson 59' c Penalties: Halfpenny (3) 15', 52', 60'; Penalties: Halfpenny (2) 28', 39'	18.832	4th
7 December 2018	Ulster	H	24–25	Tries: S. Evans (2) 25' c, 60' c, D. Davis 79' c Conversions: Patchell (2) 26', 61, D. Jones 79'; Penalty: Patchell 1'	7,421	4th
14 December 2018	Ulster	A	15–30	Tries: Jo. Davies 48' c, Prydie 77' m Conversion: Patchell 49'; Penalty: Patchell 38'	12,124	4th
12 January 2019	Leicester Tigers	H	33–10	Tries: R. Evans (2) 25' m, 46' c, Owens 36' c, McNicholl 49' c, S. Evans 63' c Conversions: D. Jones 36', 48', 50', 64'	8,087	3rd
19 January 2019	Racing 92	A	33–46	Tries: S. Evans 21' c, McNicholl (2) 45' c, 75' c Conversions: D. Jones (2) 22', 45', Hidalgo-Clyne 76'; Penalties: D. Jones (4) 2', 19', 40', 50'	14,418	3rd

=== Table ===
Pos	Team	Pld	W	D	L	F	A	PD	BP	Pts
1	(France) Racing 92	6	5	0	1	196	121	+75	6	26
2	(Ireland) Ulster	6	5	0	1	131	128	+3	2	22
3	(Wales) Scarlets	6	1	0	5	145	170	−25	3	7
4	(England) Leicester Tigers	6	1	0	5	115	168	−53	3	7

== Statistics ==
(+ in the Apps column denotes substitute appearance, positions listed are the ones they have started a game in during the season)

Pos.	Name	Pro 14						European Champions Cup						Total						Discipline	
Pos.	Name	Apps	Try	Con	Pen	Drop	Pts	Apps	Try	Con	Pen	Drop	Pts	Apps	Try	Con	Pen	Drop	Pts	Yellow card	Red card
FB	(South Africa) Clayton Blommetjies	3+3	1	0	0	0	5	0	0	0	0	0	0	3+3	1	0	0	0	5	0	0
FB	(Wales) Leigh Halfpenny	10	0	18	16	0	78	2	0	3	3	0	15	12	0	21	19	0	93	0	0
FB/WG	(Wales) Morgan Williams	1+2	1	0	0	0	5	0	0	0	0	0	0	1+2	1	0	0	0	5	0	0
WG/FB	(New Zealand) Johnny McNicholl	20	11	0	0	0	55	5	4	0	0	0	20	25	15	0	0	0	75	1	0
WG	(Wales) Tom Prydie	9+2	3	0	0	0	15	3	1	0	0	0	5	12+2	4	0	0	0	20	0	0
WG	(Wales) Steff Evans	3+4	2	0	0	0	10	6	5	0	0	0	25	9+4	7	0	0	0	35	0	0
WG	(Wales) Ioan Nicholas	13+3	7	0	0	0	35	1+1	0	0	0	0	0	14+4	7	0	0	0	35	0	0
CE/WG	(Australia) Paul Asquith	10+5	3	0	0	0	15	0+4	0	0	0	0	0	10+9	3	0	0	0	15	0	0
CE	(Wales) Steffan Hughes	3+1	0	0	0	0	0	0+3	0	0	0	0	0	3+4	0	0	0	0	0	0	0
CE	(Samoa) Kieron Fonotia	14+2	3	0	0	0	15	2	0	0	0	0	0	16+2	3	0	0	0	15	0	0
CE	(Wales) Jonathan Davies	8	5	0	0	0	25	5	1	0	0	0	5	13	6	0	0	0	30	0	0
CE/FH	(Wales) Hadleigh Parkes	9	1	0	0	0	5	5+1	0	0	0	0	0	13+1	1	0	0	0	5	0	0
FH/FB	(Wales) Rhys Patchell	7+6	2	8	4	0	38	2	0	3	2	0	12	9+6	2	11	6	0	50	0	0
FH	(Wales) Dan Jones	13+4	0	14	10	0	58	3+3	0	7	4	0	26	16+7	0	21	14	0	84	0	0
FH	(Wales) Angus O'Brien	0+3	0	2	0	0	4	1	0	0	0	0	0	1+3	0	2	0	0	4	0	0
SH	(Scotland) Sam Hidalgo-Clyne	4+8	1	0	0	0	5	0+4	0	1	0	0	2	4+12	1	1	0	0	7	0	0
SH	(Wales) Gareth Davies	9+2	4	0	0	0	20	6	2	0	0	0	10	15+2	6	0	0	0	30	0	0
SH	(Wales) Kieran Hardy	8+8	7	0	0	0	35	0+1	0	0	0	0	0	8+9	7	0	0	0	35	0	0
SH	(Wales) Jonathan Evans	0+1	0	0	0	0	0	0	0	0	0	0	0	0+1	0	0	0	0	0	0	0
N8	(South Africa) Uzair Cassiem	9+4	3	0	0	0	15	2+1	0	0	0	0	0	11+5	3	0	0	0	15	0	0
N8/FL	(Wales) Josh Macleod	12+1	1	0	0	0	5	2+1	0	0	0	0	0	14+2	1	0	0	0	5	0	0
FL/N8	(Scotland) Blade Thomson	8+1	0	0	0	0	0	2	1	0	0	0	5	10+1	1	0	0	0	5	0	0
FL/N8	(Wales) Will Boyde	10+2	1	0	0	0	5	4	0	0	0	0	0	14+2	1	0	0	0	5	0	0
FL	(Wales) James Davies	5	0	0	0	0	0	2	0	0	0	0	0	7	0	0	0	0	0	0	0
FL	(Wales) Dan Davis	7+5	1	0	0	0	5	2+1	1	0	0	0	5	9+6	2	0	0	0	10	0	0
FL	(Wales) Tom Phillips	0+4	0	0	0	0	0	0	0	0	0	0	0	0+4	0	0	0	0	0	1	0
LK/FL	(Australia) Ed Kennedy	8+6	1	0	0	0	5	3	0	0	0	0	0	11+6	1	0	0	0	5	1	0
LK/FL	(Wales) Lewis Rawlins	4+6	0	0	0	0	0	2	0	0	0	0	0	6+6	0	0	0	0	0	1	0
LK/FL	(England) Tom Price	2+6	0	0	0	0	0	1+4	0	0	0	0	0	3+10	0	0	0	0	0	0	0
LK	(Australia) Steve Cummins	12	0	0	0	0	0	0+1	0	0	0	0	0	12+1	0	0	0	0	0	0	0
LK	(South Africa) David Bulbring	11+3	0	0	0	0	0	6	0	0	0	0	0	17+3	0	0	0	0	0	2	0
LK	(Wales) Jake Ball	10	0	0	0	0	0	2	0	0	0	0	0	12	0	0	0	0	0	0	0
LK	(Wales) Josh Helps	5+5	0	0	0	0	0	2+2	0	0	0	0	0	7+7	0	0	0	0	0	0	0
HK/N8	(Wales) Ken Owens	11+1	0	0	0	0	0	5	1	0	0	0	5	16+1	1	0	0	0	5	0	0
HK	(Wales) Ryan Elias	6+8	0	0	0	0	0	2+2	0	0	0	0	0	8+10	0	0	0	0	0	0	0
HK	(Wales) Marc Jones	4+5	0	0	0	0	0	0+2	0	0	0	0	0	4+7	0	0	0	0	0	0	0
HK	(Wales) Dafydd Hughes	1+5	1	0	0	0	5	0+1	0	0	0	0	0	1+6	1	0	0	0	5	0	0
HK	(Wales) Taylor Davies	0+1	1	0	0	0	5	0	0	0	0	0	0	0+1	1	0	0	0	5	0	0
PR	(South Africa) Werner Kruger	11+10	1	0	0	0	5	0+4	0	0	0	0	0	11+14	1	0	0	0	5	0	0
PR	(Wales) Rob Evans	6+1	2	0	0	0	10	3+1	2	0	0	0	10	9+2	4	0	0	0	20	0	0
PR	(Wales) Simon Gardiner	0+9	1	0	0	0	5	0+2	0	0	0	0	0	0+11	1	0	0	0	5	0	0
PR	(Wales) Phil Price	8+6	0	0	0	0	0	0+1	0	0	0	0	0	8+7	0	0	0	0	0	0	0
PR	(Wales) Samson Lee	10	0	0	0	0	0	6	0	0	0	0	0	16	0	0	0	0	0	1	0
PR	(Wales) Wyn Jones	7+7	1	0	0	0	5	3+3	0	0	0	0	0	10+10	1	0	0	0	5	1	0
PR	(Wales) Dylan Evans	0+6	0	0	0	0	0	0	0	0	0	0	0	0+6	0	0	0	0	0	0	0
PR	(Wales) Javan Sebastian	0+1	0	0	0	0	0	0	0	0	0	0	0	0+1	0	0	0	0	0	0	0

Stats accurate as of match played 18 May 2019

== Transfers ==
=== In ===
Date confirmed	Pos.	Name	From	Ref.
29 November 2017	CE	(Samoa) Kieron Fonotia	Ospreys	
27 February 2018	LK	(New Zealand) Blade Thomson	(New Zealand) Hurricanes	
20 March 2018	N8	(South Africa) Uzair Cassiem	(South Africa) Cheetahs	
10 April 2018	FB	(South Africa) Clayton Blommetjies	(South Africa) Cheetahs	
1 May 2018	SH	(Scotland) Sam Hidalgo-Clyne	(Scotland) Edinburgh	
1 May 2018	SH	(Wales) Kieran Hardy	(England) Jersey Reds	
15 May 2018	FH	(Wales) Angus O'Brien	Dragons	
15 May 2018	FL	(Australia) Ed Kennedy	(Australia) Randwick	
15 May 2018	LK	(Wales) Matthew Davies	Neath	
24 August 2018	HK	(Wales) Marc Jones	(England) Sale Sharks	

=== Out ===
Date confirmed	Pos.	Name	To	Ref.
3 October 2017	LK	(Ireland) Tadhg Beirne	(Ireland) Munster	
17 November 2017	FL	(Scotland) John Barclay	(Scotland) Edinburgh	
29 November 2017	CE	(Wales) Scott Williams	Ospreys	
4 December 2017	SH	(Wales) Aled Davies	Ospreys	
26 February 2018	N8	(Wales) Jack Condy	Retired	
13 April 2018	WG	(Wales) Tom Grabham	Retired	
14 April 2018	HK	(Wales) Emyr Phillips	Retired	
29 April 2018	FB	(Wales) Tom Williams	Unattached	
23 January 2019	PR	(Wales) Rhys Fawcett	Dragons (loan)	
14 March 2019	SH	(Scotland) Sam Hidalgo-Clyne	(England) Harlequins (loan)	
9 April 2019	FB	(South Africa) Clayton Blommetjies	(England) Leicester Tigers (loan)	
