= Luke Davies (rugby union) =

Welsh rugby union player (born 2002)

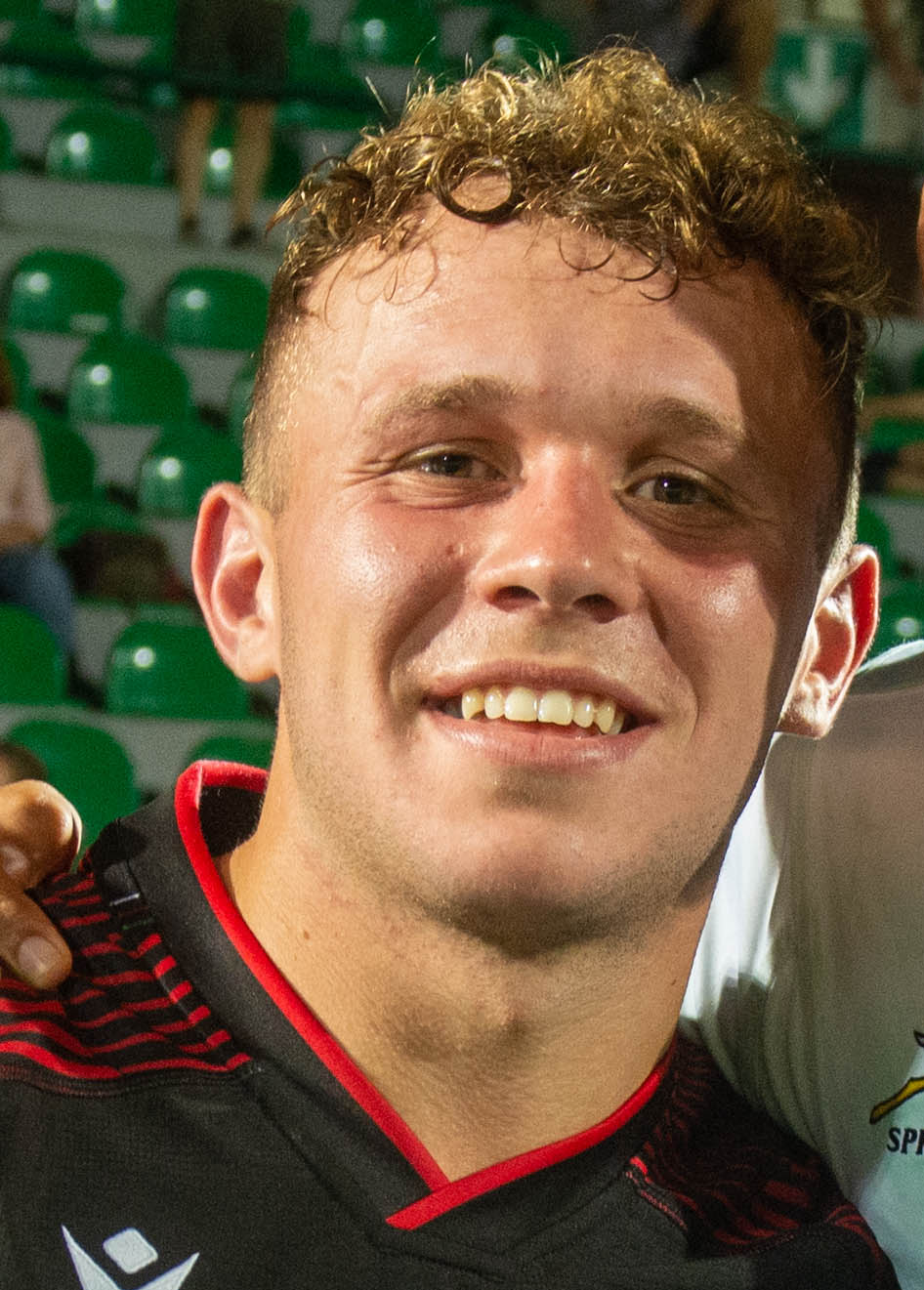
- Born: 26 February 2002 (age 24) Carmarthen, Wales
- Height: 1.75 m (5 ft 9 in)
- Weight: 80 kg (12 st 8 lb; 180 lb)
- School: Coleg Sir Gar
- Notable relative: Kieran Hardy (cousin)

Rugby union career
- Position: Scrum-half
- Current team: Ospreys
Amateur team(s)
Years	Team	Apps	(Points)
2021–2023	Llanelli RFC	16	(19)
Senior career
Years	Team	Apps	(Points)
2021	Scarlets	1	(0)
2023	Jersey Reds		
2023–	Ospreys	10	(5)
- Correct as of 2 January 2024
International career
Years	Team	Apps	(Points)
2022	Wales U20	3	(5)
- Correct as of 25 October 2023

Luke Davies is a Welsh rugby union player who plays as a scrum-half for the Ospreys. Davies previously played for the Scarlets and Jersey Reds.

== Club career ==
=== Scarlets and Llanelli ===
Davies was named in the Scarlets squad for the 2021–22 season. He made his debut for the Scarlets in Round 5 of the 2021–22 United Rugby Championship against Benetton. Davies was not listed in the squad for the 2022–23 season, and instead played for Llanelli RFC.

=== Jersey ===
In March 2023, Davies joined Jersey Reds as short term injury cover. He made his debut on 8 April 2023 against Doncaster Knights. At the end of the season, Davies departed the club, following the conclusion of his contract.

=== Ospreys ===
Davies signed for the Ospreys on 14 July 2023. Davies made his debut on 29 October 2023, against Connacht Rugby in the first round of the 2023–24 United Rugby Championship. He scored his first try on 1 December 2023, as the Ospreys lost 18–13 to Benetton Rugby.

== International career ==
In 2022, Davies was selected by Wales U20 for the 2022 Six Nations Under 20s Championship, having missed the previous year due to a shoulder injury. Davies made his debut against Italy U20 on 20 March 2022, scoring a try. Davies was selected in the squad for the 2022 U20 Summer Series, making two further appearances.

== Personal life ==
Davies’s cousin is Kieran Hardy, also a scrum half. Like Davies, Hardy played for the Scarlets and Jersey Reds before signing with the Ospreys.
