= Tevita Ratuva =

Fiji international rugby union player (born 1995)

- Born: Tevita Ratuva; 8 May 1995 (age 31) Nadroga, Fiji
- Height: 2.0 m (6 ft 7 in)
- Weight: 121 kg (267 lb)
- School: Cuvu College

Rugby union career
- Position: Lock
- Current team: CA Brive
Senior career
Years	Team	Apps	(Points)
2017	Brisbane City	2	(0)
2018–2019	Bordeaux	0	(0)
2019–2021	Scarlets	21	(5)
2021–2025	Brive	70	(25)
- Correct as of 23 March 2021
International career
Years	Team	Apps	(Points)
2018	Fiji Warriors		
2019	Fiji	11	(5)
- Correct as of 25 September 2019

Tevita Ratuva (born 8 May 1995) is a Fijian rugby player for Scarlets in the Pro14.

Ratuva played for Brisbane City in Australia's 2017 National Rugby Championship. In 2018 he was part of the Fiji Warriors side which won the 2018 World Rugby Pacific Challenge, in competition with Junior Japan, Samoa A and Tonga A. In the summer of 2018 Ratuva moved to Bordeaux but suffered a broken leg and did not play for the club in the 2018-19 Top 14 season, in March 2019 he returned to action for Bordeaux's Espoirs side.

He made his debut for the Fijian team in a non-capped match against the Māori All Blacks in July 2019. His test debut came against Canada on 3 August 2019 in Suva, Fiji.

In August 2019 he was named in Fiji's squad for the 2019 Rugby World Cup.

On 24 September 2019, the Scarlets of the Pro14 announced Ratuva's signature for the forthcoming season. He joined the Welsh side after that year's World Cup.

On 13 January 2021, it was announced that Ratuva would return to France to join Top 14 side Brive ahead of the 2021–22 season.
