= Brad Mooar =

New Zealand professional rugby union coach

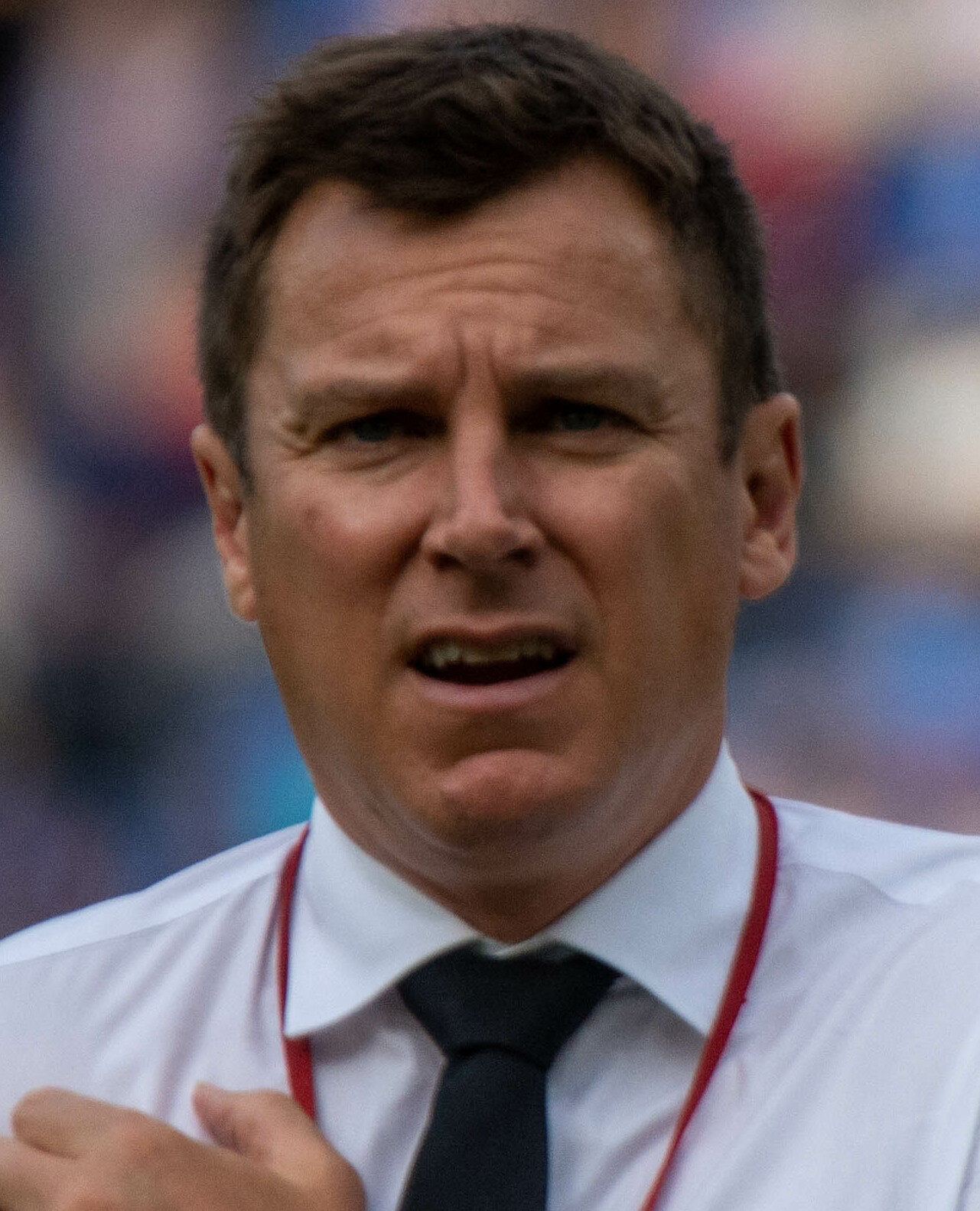
- Full name: Bradley James Mooar
- Born: 28 August 1974 (age 52) Christchurch, New Zealand
- School: Christchurch Boys' High School
- University: University of Canterbury

Rugby union career
- Position: First five-eighth
- Current team: Scotland (assistant)
Senior career
Years	Team	Apps	(Points)
1997–1998	Mid Canterbury	26	(139)
1998–2000	Independiente Rugby Club		
- Correct as of 29 August 2023
Coaching career
- Years: Team
- 2012–2013: Eastern Province Kings (assistant)
- 2013: Southern Kings (assistant)
- 2013: Independiente Rugby Club
- 2014–2015: Southland
- 2016–2019: Crusaders (assistant)
- 2019–2020: Scarlets
- 2020: South Island
- 2020–2022: New Zealand (assistant)
- 2023–: Scotland (assistant)
- Correct as of 29 August 2023

Brad Mooar (born 28 August 1974) is a New Zealand professional rugby union coach. He was previously assistant coach at Southern Kings and Crusaders and was head coach at the Scarlets in Wales. Nowadays is assistant coach in the Scotland men’s national rugby union team.
