= Pieter Scholtz =

South African rugby union player (born 1994)

- Full name: Pieter Ernst Scholtz
- Born: 20 March 1994 (age 32) Pretoria, South Africa
- Height: 1.87 m (6 ft 1 1/2 in)
- Weight: 120 kg (260 lb; 18 st 13 lb)
- School: af:Hoërskool Diamantveld, Kimberley

Rugby union career
- Position: Tighthead prop
- Current team: Mitsubishi Dynaboars
Youth career
- 2007–2012: Griquas
- 2013–2015: Golden Lions
Senior career
Years	Team	Apps	(Points)
2014–2017	Golden Lions XV	24	(0)
2015–2016	Golden Lions	3	(0)
2016	Lions	2	(0)
2017	Pumas	11	(0)
2017–2020	Southern Kings	27	(0)
2019–2020	Eastern Province Elephants	1	(0)
2020–2021	Scarlets	9	(0)
2021–2022	Wasps	9	(0)
2022–2025	Bayonne	54	(0)
2025–	Mitsubishi Dynaboars	16	(5)
- Correct as of 1 July 2019

Pieter Ernst Scholtz (born 20 March 1994) is a South African rugby union player for the Bayonne in the Top 14. He previously played for Southern Kings in the Pro14 and the Eastern Province Elephants in the Currie Cup and in the Rugby Challenge. His regular position is tighthead prop.

== Career ==
=== Griquas ===
Scholtz grew up in the Northern Cape, where he was eligible for represent Griquas in provincial competition. He did so from 2007 to 2012; in 2007, he was included in their squad that played at the Under-13 Craven Week in Krugersdorp and he progressed through the age levels, representing them at the Under-16 Grant Khomo Week in 2010 and the Under-18 Craven Week in 2011. He also made two appearances for Griquas U19 in the 2012 Under-19 Provincial Championship, scoring a try in their match against Eastern Province U19.

=== Golden Lions ===
Scholtz moved to Johannesburg to join the Golden Lions Academy prior to the 2013 season. He firmly established himself as the first-choice tighthead prop for the Golden Lions U19 side during the 2013 Under-19 Provincial Championship, starting thirteen of their fourteen matches in the competition. The Golden Lions finished second on the log and two of Scholtz's appearances were their 27–25 victory over the Sharks U19 in the semi-final and their 23–35 defeat to the Blue Bulls U19 in the final.

Scholtz made his first class debut during the 2014 Vodacom Cup, starting their 18–16 victory over the Leopards XV in Potchefstroom in his only appearance in the competition. Despite being in the Under-20 age-group, he started eight of the Golden Lions U21s' 13 matches in the 2014 Under-21 Provincial Championship. He scored a try in their match against the Leopards U21s as they qualified for the semi-finals, only to lose 19–23 to the Blue Bulls U21 at that stage.

Scholtz was utilised as the Golden Lions' number one tighthead prop during the 2015 Vodacom Cup; he started in that position in eight of their matches as they reached the semi-finals of the competition, where they lost to the Pumas in Johannesburg. He once again played for the Under-21 side in the 2015 Under-21 Provincial Championship Group A, but was also included in the starting line-up for the Golden Lions' final match in the 2015 Currie Cup Premier Division regular season and made his Currie Cup debut as they beat his former side Griquas 29–19 to finish the season unbeaten and finishing top of the log.

=== Europe ===
On 11 November 2020, Scholtz would join Welsh region Scarlets in the Pro14 competition for the remainder of the 2020-21 season.

On 9 June 2021, Scholtz signs for English side Wasps in the Premiership Rugby competition ahead of the 2021-22 season.

On 27 June 2022, Scholtz would leave Wasps as he moves to France to join Bayonne in the Top 14 competition ahead of the 2022-23 season.
