= Alex Jeffries =

Welsh rugby union player (born 1995)

- Born: Alex Jeffries; 27 April 1995 (age 31) Newport, Wales
- Height: 1.93 m (6 ft 4 in)
- Weight: 123 kg (19 st 5 lb)
- School: West Monmouth School; Coleg Gwent

Rugby union career
- Position: Tighthead prop
Senior career
Years	Team	Apps	(Points)
2012–2013	Newport	70	(35)
2013–2015	Bedwas	2	(0)
2014	Cross Keys	5	(0)
2014–2016	Dragons	0	(0)
2016–2019	Ospreys	17	(10)
2016–2018	Aberavon	26	(35)
2018–2019	Swansea	14	(5)
2019–2023	Scarlets	6	(5)
2019–2023	Llanelli	17	(15)
2022	Carmarthen Quins	1	(0)
2022	→ Saracens (loan)	1	(0)
International career
Years	Team	Apps	(Points)
2013	Wales U18		
2015	Wales U20	2	(0)

Alex Jeffries (born 27 April 1995) is a Welsh former professional rugby union player who played as a prop. He retired from rugby due to a neck injury in April 2023.

== Career ==
=== Club ===
Jeffries has played senior rugby in the Welsh Premier Division for Newport RFC, Bedwas and Cross Keys and was part of the Newport Gwent Dragons squad. He was also part of the Newport Gwent Dragons academy.

Jeffries signed for Ospreys in 2016 and made his first team debut on 25 January 2018 alongside Cai Evans.

He moved to the Scarlets ahead of the 2019–20 season, arriving on the same day as lock Danny Drake and scrum-half Dane Blacker. After rugby was disrupted by the COVID-19 pandemic in 2020, he made his debut in February 2021, coming off the bench in a win over Edinburgh. His first start came in a 52–32 loss to the Dragons in the Pro14 Rainbow Cup that April. He scored the Scarlets' only try in the next match, a 22–6 win over the Ospreys on 8 May. He started the 2021–22 season playing for Llanelli RFC, before being allowed to move on loan to Saracens in February 2022, where he would provide cover for the injured Marco Riccioni and Alec Clarey. Early in the 2022–23 season, he suffered a neck injury playing for Llanelli, and in April 2023, he retired from rugby on medical advice.

=== International ===
Jeffries was part of the Wales U18 squad that competed in the 2013 FIRA-AER tournament in Grenoble, France. He scored two tries in the final game against Georgia U18.

Jeffries was part of the Wales U20 squad that competed in the 2015 Six Nations Under 20s Championship.
