= Harri Doel =

Welsh rugby union footballer

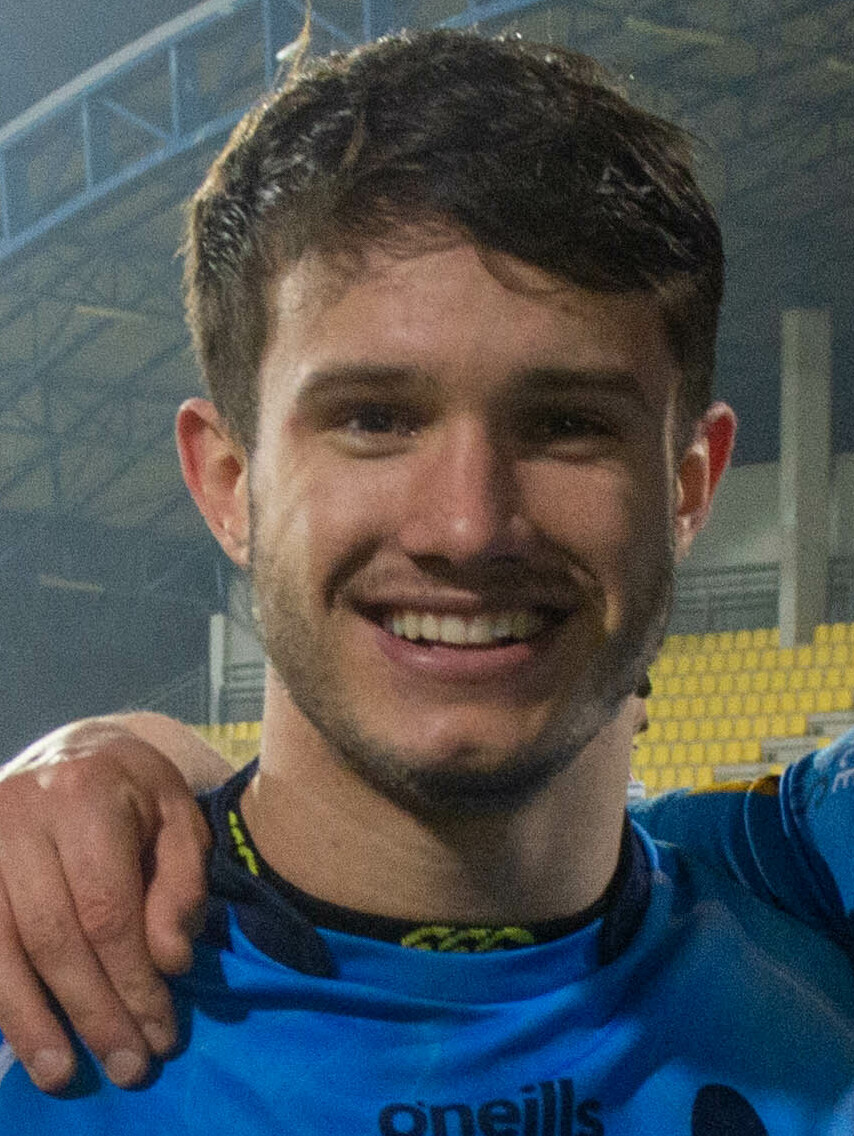
- Born: 2 August 2000 (age 26) Carmarthen, Wales
- Height: 1.78 m (5 ft 10 in)
- Weight: 86 kg (190 lb; 13 st 8 lb)
- School: Coleg Sir Gâr
- University: Swansea University

Rugby union career
- Position: Wing
- Current team: Llandovery RFC
Senior career
Years	Team	Apps	(Points)
2016–2021	Llandovery RFC	21	(25)
2016–2021	Scarlets	0	(0)
2020–2022	Worcester Warriors	18	(30)
2022–	Llandovery RFC	6	(10)
2023	Scarlets	1	(0)
2023	Ospreys	1	(0)
- Correct as of 11 March 2023
International career
Years	Team	Apps	(Points)
2017–2018	Wales U18		
- Correct as of 9 June 2021

Harri Doel (born 2 August 2000) is a Welsh professional rugby union player who plays as a wing for Llandovery RFC. He previously played for Worcester Warriors, until the club liquidated in 2022.

== Professional career ==
Doel played his formative rugby for his hometown club, Llandovery, beginning in the Under-7s and playing at every level through to the first team. Doel attended Coleg Sir Gar near Llanelli, and completed a mathematics degree at Swansea University.

He joined the Scarlets Academy in 2016 and was a regular in the Scarlets A team in the 2019–20 Celtic Cup.

Doel was selected for Wales in the Under-20s Six Nations having previously represented his country at all age groups from Under-16s. He did not make an appearance for the side, as the U20 season was disrupted by the COVID-19 pandemic.

On 16 April 2021, Doel signed for English side Worcester Warriors on loan for the 2020-21 Premiership Rugby season. On 29 April 2021, following impressive performances for the side, Doel signed a permanent deal to stay with Worcester ahead of the 2021-22 season. On 5 October 2022 all Worcester players had their contacts terminated due to the liquidation of the company to which they were contracted.

Following the collapse of Worcester, Doel rejoined Llandovery on 9 November 2022. He combined his playing career with a part-time job working for the family construction firm.

On 10 March 2023, Doel made his first appearance for the Scarlets, in a friendly against the Saracens.

Doel joined the Ospreys on 31 March 2023, as injury cover until the end of the season. He made one appearance for the Ospreys, coming off the bench against Cardiff in the annual Judgement Day fixture.
