= Simon Gardiner =

Welsh rugby player (born 1990)

- Born: Simon Gardiner; 2 October 1990 (age 36) Haverfordwest, Wales
- Height: 1.85 m (6 ft 1 in)
- Weight: 121 kg (19 st 1 lb)

Rugby union career
- Position: Tighthead Prop
Senior career
Years	Team	Apps	(Points)
2007–09	Llanelli	30	(10)
2009–10	Carmarthen Quins	14	(5)
2010–12	Llanelli	39	(15)
2012–13	Swansea	17	(0)
2013–14	Cardiff	8	(0)
2014–16	Moseley		(0)
2016–18	Llanelli	9	(0)
Provincial / State sides
Years	Team	Apps	(Points)
2009–2014, 2016–	Scarlets	56	(5)

Simon Gardiner (born 10 February 1990) is a Welsh rugby union prop forward who plays for the Scarlets. Gardiner was released by the Scarlets, and joined Rotherham Titans in 2012. After spells at Cardiff RFC and Llanelli RFC, Gardiner moved to Moseley RFC in 2014. Gardiner returned to the Scarlets ahead of the 2017–18 season.
