= Kieron Fonotia =

New Zealand-born Samoan rugby player (born 1988)

- Full name: Kieron T. Fonotia
- Born: 2 February 1988 (age 38) Christchurch, New Zealand
- Height: 185 cm (6 ft 1 in)
- Weight: 105 kg (231 lb; 16 st 7 lb)
- School: Shirley Boys' High School

Rugby union career
- Position(s): Centre, Wing
Senior career
Years	Team	Apps	(Points)
2011–2016, 2020	Tasman	72	(60)
2014–2016	Crusaders	40	(20)
2016–2018	Ospreys	41	(35)
2018–2020	Scarlets	27	(15)
- Correct as of 29 November 2020
International career
Years	Team	Apps	(Points)
2017–2019	Samoa	12	(5)
- Correct as of 19 August 2020

Kieron T. Fonotia (born 2 February 1988) is a former New Zealand born Samoan rugby union player who played as a Centre for the Tasman Mako in the Bunnings NPC.

== Career ==
Fonotia played 40 games for the Crusaders and 65 games for Tasman before he left New Zealand at the end of the 2016 season and joined the Welsh side Ospreys.

On 16 June 2017, Fonotia made his debut for the Samoa national rugby union team after qualifying for selection through his Grandfather.

Fonotia returned to New Zealand in 2020 after he was cut from Welsh side Scarlets. He was part of the Tasman side that won the Mitre 10 Cup for the second time in a row in 2020.
