= Glenn Delaney =

New Zealand professional rugby union football coach

- Born: 16 November 1973 (age 52) Timaru, Canterbury, New Zealand
- School: St Andrew's College, Christchurch
- University: University of Canterbury; University of Leicester
- Notable relative(s): Josh Delaney, Charlotte Delaney, Hannah Delaney, Alex Delaney

Rugby union career
- Position: Lock / Number 8
Senior career
Years	Team	Apps	(Points)
1993–1997	Toyoko Group		
1997–1999	東京外人倶楽部		
2000–2003	London Irish		
2003–2004	Narbonne		
- Correct as of 26 June 2020
Coaching career
- Years: Team
- 2004–2012: Nottingham
- 2007–2009: Nottingham (CEO)
- 2012–2014: London Irish (Forwards coach)
- 2015: London Irish
- 2015–2016: London Irish (Head of Rugby)
- 2016–2017: Canterbury
- 2017–2019: Highlanders (assistant)
- 2019–2020: Scarlets (assistant)
- 2020–2021: Scarlets
- Correct as of 9 May 2021

Glenn Delaney (born 16 November 1973) is a New Zealand professional rugby union football coach. He was recently the head coach of the Pro14 side Scarlets. He had previously been assistant coach to Brad Mooar at the Scarlets Previously he had been head coach of Nottingham, London Irish and Canterbury. Delaney also had a professional rugby career, playing rugby in Japan and for London Irish and Narbonne.
