= Corey Baldwin =

Welsh rugby union player

- Born: Corey Baldwin; 13 October 1998 (age 28) Surrey, England
- Height: 1.83 m (6 ft 0 in)
- Weight: 99 kg (15 st 8 lb; 218 lb)
- School: Ysgol Bro Dinefwr
- University: Swansea

Rugby union career
- Position(s): Outside Centre; Wing
Senior career
Years	Team	Apps	(Points)
2016–2019	Llandovery	17	(70)
2016–2019	Scarlets	18	(15)
2019	Llanelli	1	(0)
2020–2021	Exeter Chiefs	5	(0)
2021–2023	Scarlets	9	(15)
2023–2024	Dragons	7	(10)
2025–	Llandovery		
International career
Years	Team	Apps	(Points)
2017	Wales U20	11	

Corey Baldwin (born 13 October 1998) is a Welsh rugby union player who plays for Llandovery RFC as a winger/centre. Baldwin has previously played for Scarlets, Exeter Chiefs, and Dragons.

== Professional career ==
Baldwin made his senior debut in 2016 for Llandovery against Bedwas as a replacement. Just a month later, he made his debut for the Scarlets, scoring a try in the Anglo-Welsh Cup game against the Newport Gwent Dragons.

In 2017, Baldwin was named in the Wales U20 squad for the first time. Much like his Scarlets debut, Baldwin scored in his first game for the Wales U20s, which was a 65-34 victory over Scotland U20

On 2 March 2020, Baldwin joined Exeter Chiefs in the English Premiership Rugby competition from the 2020–21 season.

On 3 August 2021, Baldwin returned to his old region Scarlets in the United Rugby Championship ahead of the 2021–22 season.

Baldwin departed the Scarlets at the end of the 2022–23 season. He later signed for the Dragons. Baldwin made his debut on 21 October 2023, scoring a try as the Dragons lost to Edinburgh. Baldwin was released by the Dragons at the end of the season.

Following a year out of rugby, Baldwin rejoined Llandovery for the 2025–26 Super Rygbi Cymru season.
