= Rhys Fawcett =

Welsh rugby union footballer

- Born: Rhys Fawcett; 9 October 1996 (age 30) Haverfordwest, Wales
- Height: 185 cm (6 ft 1 in)
- Weight: 122 kg (19 st 3 lb)

Rugby union career
- Position: Loosehead Prop
- Current team: Pembroke RFC
Senior career
Years	Team	Apps	(Points)
2016-2020	Scarlets	12	(0)
2018	Dragons (loan)	4	(0)
2019	Ospreys (loan)	6	(0)
- Correct as of 10:32, 3 October 2020 (UTC)

Rhys Fawcett (born 9 October 1996) is a Welsh rugby union player who plays for Scarlets regional team as a prop.

Fawcett made his debut for the Scarlets regional team in 2016 having previously played for the Scarlets academy. In 2016 he was selected for the Wales U20 team for the 2016 World Rugby Under 20 Championship.

Rhys more recently went out on loan to the rivals Ospreys and faced his home club in the Boxing Day derby.

His hobbies are playing PlayStation and grafting.
