= Taylor Davies =

Welsh rugby player

- Born: Taylor Davies; 30 July 1995 (age 31) Swansea, Wales
- Height: 185 cm (6 ft 1 in)
- Weight: 108 kg (17 st 0 lb)

Rugby union career
- Position: Hooker
Senior career
Years	Team	Apps	(Points)
2013–2017	Llandovery	18	(0)
2014–2023	Llanelli	77	(40)
2016–2023	Scarlets	39	(10)
2019	Carmarthen Quins	1	(0)
2021	→ Dragons (loan)	4	(0)
2021–2022	→ Dragons (loan)	17	(10)
- Correct as of 14:05, 2 May 2023 (UTC)

Taylor Davies (born 30 July 1995) is a Welsh rugby union player who plays as a hooker. Born in Swansea, he came through the ranks with the Scarlets and played for Llandovery and Llanelli before making his regional debut in 2016. He also made one appearance for Carmarthen Quins in 2019. In 2021, he joined the Dragons on a short-term loan as a front-row option for their Pro14 Rainbow Cup matches, starting all three matches against their regional rivals, including his parent club. He returned to the Dragons on loan for the 2021–22 season; he made 17 appearances and scored two tries, including one against the Scarlets on 16 April 2022. In April 2023, Davies was named as one of 15 players leaving the Scarlets at the end of the 2022–23 season.
