= Tom Phillips (rugby union) =

Welsh rugby union player

- Born: Tom Phillips; 13 February 1996 (age 30) Swansea, Wales
- Height: 192 cm (6 ft 4 in)
- Weight: 110 kg (17 st 5 lb; 243 lb)

Rugby union career
- Position: Blindside Flanker
- Current team: Scarlets
Senior career
| Years | Team | Apps | (Points) |
| 2013– | Llanelli RFC | 31 | (11) |
| 2015–2021 | Scarlets | 29 | (10) |
- Correct as of 6 November 2022
International career
| Years | Team | Apps | (Points) |
| 2015–2016 | Wales U20 | 16 | (20) |
- Correct as of 6 November 2022

Tom Phillips (born 13 February 1996) is a Welsh rugby union player who plays for Llanelli RFC as a flanker.

== Career ==
Phillips made his debut for the Scarlets regional team in 2015 having previously played for the Scarlets academy.

Phillips captained Wales U20 during their Grand Slam campaign in 2016.

He was released by the Scarlets at the end of the 2020–2021 season, but rejoined as injury cover at the start of the next season. Phillips suffered a serious injury on his return, and played no further part in their campaign, again leaving the club at the end of the season.

Phillips was named captain of Llanelli RFC ahead of the 2022–2023 season, and was also named as a skills coach for the Scarlets Academy, continuing his involvement with the club.
