= Steffan Hughes (rugby union) =

Welsh rugby union player

- Born: Steffan Hughes; 17 February 1994 (age 32) Llanelli, Wales
- Height: 178 cm (5 ft 10 in)
- Weight: 91 kg (14 st 5 lb)
- School: Ysgol y Strade

Rugby union career
- Position: Centre
- Current team: Dragons RFC
Senior career
Years	Team	Apps	(Points)
2011–2022	Llanelli RFC	61	(30)
2013–2022	Scarlets	100	(30)
2022–2024	Dragons	38	(20)
2024–	Old Glory DC		
- Correct as of 8 October 2024
International career
Years	Team	Apps	(Points)
2013–2014	Wales U20	29	(15)
- Correct as of 11:45, 6 February 2024 (UTC)

Steffan Hughes (born 17 February 1994) is a Welsh rugby union player who plays for Old Glory DC as a centre. Hughes previously played for the Scarlets regional team. He is a Wales Under-20 international and previously captained the side.

Hughes made his debut for the Scarlets regional team in 2014 having previously played for the Scarlets academy. Ahead of the 2019-2020 season, Hughes was named as one of the Scarlets' vice-captains along with Werner Kruger, James Davies and Jonathan Davies. Hughes had first captained the Scarlets side against the Cheetahs during the 2017-2018 season.

Following the 2021–2022 season, Hughes was released by the Scarlets, and subsequently joined Dragons RFC on a short-term deal as injury cover. After scoring 3 tries in 18 appearances, Hughes signed a new long-term with the Dragons at the end of the 2022-2023 season.

On 1 September 2023, ahead of the new season, Hughes was named as the new Dragons RFC captain for the upcoming campaign.

Hughes departed the Dragons during the 2024–24 season to join Old Glory DC in Major League Rugby.
