= Dafydd Hughes =

Welsh rugby player

- Born: Dafydd Hughes; 8 January 1996 (age 30) Carmarthen, Wales
- Height: 178 cm (5 ft 10 in)
- Weight: 101 kg (15 st 13 lb)
- School: Llandovery College

Rugby union career
- Position: Hooker
- Current team: Cardiff Rugby
Senior career
Years	Team	Apps	(Points)
2015–2023	Llandovery	65	(105)
2016–2023	Scarlets	38	(30)
2019	Llanelli	1	(5)
2023–2024	Jersey Reds	3	(0)
2024–	Cardiff	2	
- Correct as of 14:16, 2 May 2023 (UTC)
International career
Years	Team	Apps	(Points)
2016	Wales U20	10	(5)
- Correct as of 14 September 2016

Dafydd Hughes (born 8 January 1996) is a Welsh rugby union player who plays for Cardiff Rugby as a hooker. He is a Wales under-20 international.

== Professional career ==
Hughes started his career at Llandovery, and he made 22 appearances in his debut season. He also scored 3 tries in the process.

Hughes was then awarded his first professional Scarlets contract on 25 May 2016

Hughes started every game for Wales U20 in the 2016 Six Nations Under 20s Championship, in which they won the Grand Slam. He also scored a try on his Wales U20 debut. He also started in all but one of Wales' games in the 2016 World Rugby Under 20 Championship.

His Scarlets debut came in the Anglo-Welsh Cup against Newport Gwent Dragons, a game in which he scored a try. He made 38 appearances for the Scarlets before being released at the end of the 2022–23 season.

Hughes signed with RFC Championship winners Jersey Reds for the 2023–24 season.
