= Phil Price (rugby union) =

Welsh rugby player (born 1988)

- Born: Phil Price; 10 November 1988 (age 38) Rome, Italy,
- Height: 185 cm (6 ft 1 in)
- Weight: 115 kg (18 st 2 lb)

Rugby union career
- Position: Loosehead Prop
- Current team: Scarlets
Senior career
Years	Team	Apps	(Points)
2009–2018	Dragons	159	(30)
2018-	Scarlets	60	(5)
- Correct as of 12 August 2021

Phil Price (born 10 November 1988) is a Welsh rugby union player. A prop forward, he has represented Wales at Under 18 and Under 19 levels.

Price previously played for Bridgend RFC, Bedwas RFC, and the Ospreys Under-18 and Under-20 regional teams.

Price subsequently joined the Dragons and made his debut versus Glasgow on 16 October 2009.

Price was released by the Dragons at the end of the 2017–18 season and joined the Scarlets.
