= Marc Jones (rugby union) =

Welsh rugby union footballer (born 1987)

- Born: Geraint Marc Jones; 3 April 1987 (age 39) Pontypridd, Wales
- Height: 188 cm (6 ft 2 in)
- Weight: 104 kg (16 st 5 lb)

Rugby union career
- Position: Hooker
Amateur team(s)
Years	Team	Apps	(Points)
- Treorchy RFC
Senior career
Years	Team	Apps	(Points)
2005−15	Sale Sharks	158	(25)
2015−17	Bristol	18	(5)
2017−18	Sale Sharks		
2018−	Scarlets	1	(0)
- Correct as of 30 September 2018
International career
Years	Team	Apps	(Points)
- Wales U16
–	Wales U18		
–	Wales U19		
–	Wales U20		
- Correct as of 14 April 2012

Marc Jones (born 3 April 1987) is a rugby union player for the Scarlets in the Pro 14 He plays as a hooker. In the 2005–2006 season, Jones made 1 appearance as Sale Sharks won their first ever Premiership title.

On 19 January 2015, it was announced Jones joined Bristol on a two-year deal starting from the next season. On 22 March 2017, Jones returned to Sale Sharks on a two-year contract from the 2017–18 season.

On 28 August 2018, Jones left Sale to sign for Welsh region Scarlets in the Pro14 from the 2018–19 season.
