= Steffan Hughes =

Wales international rugby league footballer

Personal information
- Full name: Steffan Hughes
- Born: 11 February 1981 (age 44); Croydon, London, England

Playing information
- Position: Centre, Loose forward, Second-row
Club
Years	Team	Pld	T	G	FG	P
1999–01	London Broncos	18	1	0	0	4
Representative
Years	Team	Pld	T	G	FG	P
2001	Wales	1	0	0	0	0
- As of 12 May 2021

Steffan Hughes (born 11 February 1981 in Croydon, South London) is a rugby league footballer who played in the 1990s and 2000s. He played at representative level for Wales, and at club level for London Broncos in 1999's Super League IV, 2000's Super League V, and 2001's Super League VI, as a centre, second-row, or loose forward.
