= Ioan Nicholas =

Welsh rugby union player

Ioan Sion Nicholas
- Born: Ioan Nicholas; 3 April 1998 (age 28) Pontyberem, Wales
- Height: 180 cm (5 ft 11 in)
- Weight: 88 kg (13 st 12 lb)
- School: Ysgol Maes Y Gwendraeth
- Notable relative: Nigel Owens (cousin)

Rugby union career
- Position(s): Wing; Inside Centre; Fullback
- Current team: Scarlets
Senior career
Years	Team	Apps	(Points)
2015–	Llanelli RFC	11	(10)
2015–	Scarlets	71	(50)
- Correct as of 9 December 2023
International career
Years	Team	Apps	(Points)
2018	Wales U20	2	(0)
- Correct as of 2 November 2022

Ioan Nicholas (born 3 April 1998) is a Welsh rugby union player who plays for Scarlets and Llanelli as a centre.

Nicholas made his debut for the Scarlets as a 17 year old in a friendly against Jersey in 2015. He played a part in the remaining two friendlies of the 2015-16 season before making his competitive debut against Ulster as a substitute.

Nicholas was named as the Supporters’ Player of the Season for the 2023–24 United Rugby Championship season.
