= Ed Kennedy (rugby union) =

Australian rugby player (born 1994)

- Born: Edward Kennedy; 19 August 1994 (age 32) Goulburn, Australia
- Height: 196 cm (6 ft 5 in)
- Weight: 112 kg (247 lb)
- School: Scots College

Rugby union career
- Position(s): Blindside Flanker; Lock
Amateur team(s)
Years	Team	Apps	(Points)
2012–2018	Randwick	48	
Senior career
Years	Team	Apps	(Points)
2017	Sydney Rays	1	(0)
2018–2021	Scarlets	40	(15)
2022-2024	Brumbies	7	

Ed Kennedy (born 19 September 1994) is a retired Australian rugby union player who most recently played for the Scarlets in the Pro14 competition. His position of choice is flanker and Lock. He is Welsh qualified. At the end of 2021 Kennedy signed with Brumbies Rugby and has been with them since.
