= Lewis Rawlins =

Welsh rugby union player

- Born: Lewis Rawlins; 13 April 1990 (age 36) Caerphilly, Wales
- Height: 198 cm (6 ft 6 in)
- Weight: 114 kg (17 st 13 lb)

Rugby union career
- Position(s): Lock; Blindside Flanker
- Current team: Scarlets
Senior career
Years	Team	Apps	(Points)
2011-12	Cross Keys		
2012-16	Llanelli RFC	50	(10)
- Correct as of 2 March 2017
Provincial / State sides
Years	Team	Apps	(Points)
2012-	Scarlets	60	(5)
- Correct as of 2 March 2017
- Correct as of 7 December 2015

Lewis Rawlins (born 13 April 1990) is a Welsh rugby union player who plays for the Scarlets as a second row or a flanker.

Rawlins made his debut for the Scarlets in 2012 having previously played for their academy, Caerphilly RFC, Cross Keys RFC and Llanelli RFC. He was part of the squad that won the Pro 12 in the 2016–2017 season.
