= Dan Jones (rugby union, born 1996) =

Welsh rugby union player

- Born: Daniel Jones; 7 January 1996 (age 30) Carmarthen, Wales
- Height: 188 cm (6 ft 2 in)
- Weight: 88 kg (13 st 12 lb)

Rugby union career
- Current team: Scarlets
Senior career
Years	Team	Apps	(Points)
2013-	Carmarthen Quins	33	(171)
- Correct as of 22 January 2017
Provincial / State sides
Years	Team	Apps	(Points)
2014-	Scarlets	144	(580)
- Correct as of 9 December 2023
International career
Years	Team	Apps	(Points)
2014-	Wales U20	11	(97)
- Correct as of 7 September 2016

Dan Jones (born 7 January 1996) is a Welsh rugby union player who plays for Scarlets regional team as a fly half.

Jones made his debut for the Scarlets regional team in 2015 having previously played for the Scarlets academy and Carmarthen Quins.
