= Josh Helps =

Welsh rugby union player

- Born: Josh Helps; 22 December 1994 (age 31) Narberth, Pembrokeshire
- Height: 195 cm (6 ft 5 in)
- Weight: 104 kg (16 st 5 lb)
- School: Ysgol Dyffryn Taf

Rugby union career
- Position: Lock
Senior career
Years	Team	Apps	(Points)
2013–	Carmarthen Quins	87	(11)
2015–2022	Scarlets	48	(10)
- Correct as of 24 November 2022
International career
Years	Team	Apps	(Points)
- Wales U18
–	Wales U20		
- Correct as of 1 March 2017

Josh Helps (born 22 December 1994) is a retired Welsh rugby union player. He played for the Scarlets as a second rower.

Helps made his Quins debut as an 18-year-old against rivals Llanelli RFC. However, it was not until the 2015-16 season that he became a regular for the Quins, when he made 25 appearances - 23 of those were starts.

Helps was part of the Scarlets squad. He made his debut in a friendly against the Bedford Blues.

During the 2022–2023 season, Helps retired from professional rugby to pursue a career in finance. He will however still play semi-professionally for Carmarthen Quins.
