= Gareth Davies (rugby union, born 1990) =

Welsh rugby union player

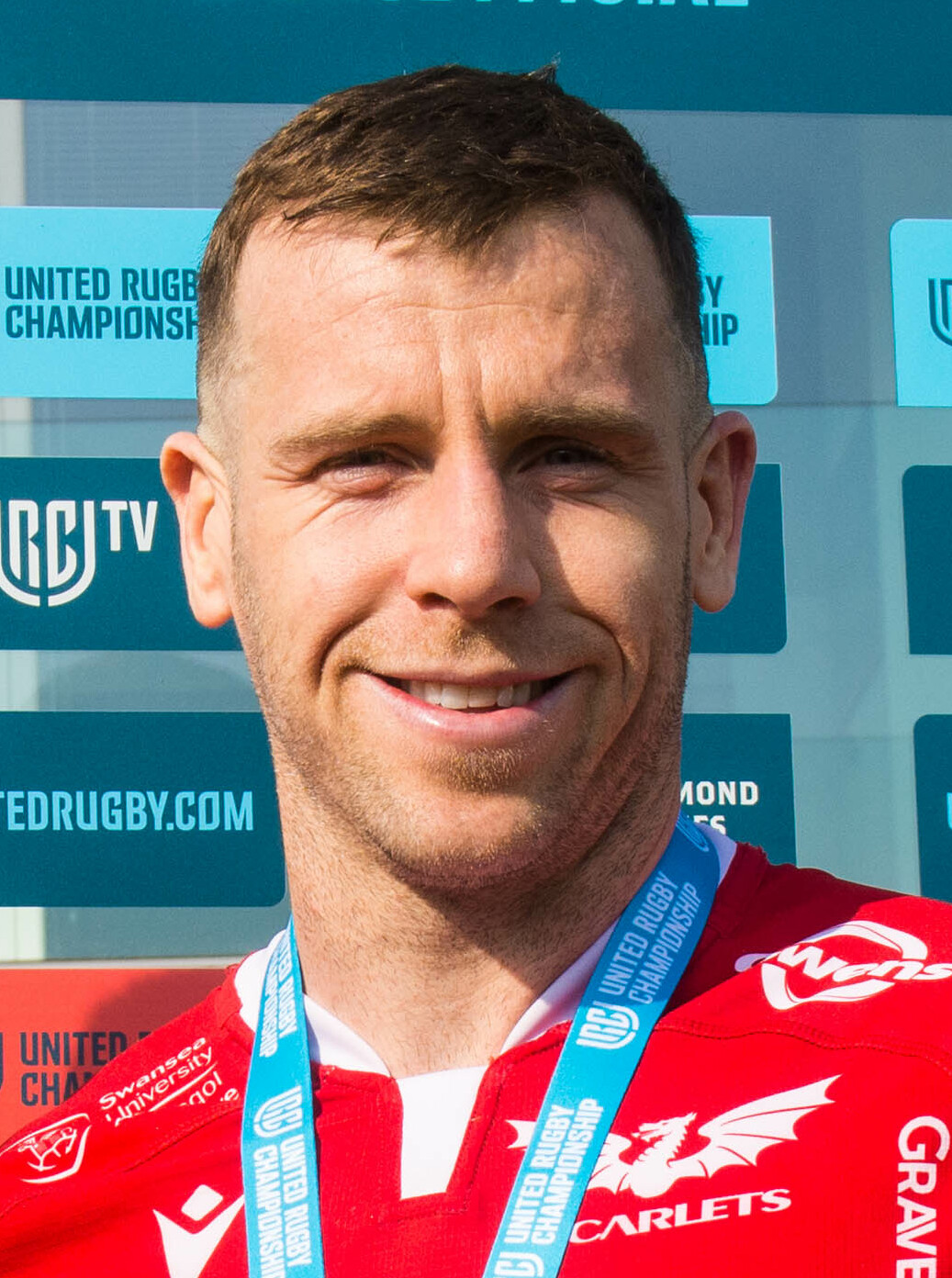
- Davies representing Scarlets during the United Rugby Championship
- Full name: David Gareth Davies
- Born: 18 August 1990 (age 36) Carmarthen, Wales
- Height: 1.78 m (5 ft 10 in)
- Weight: 88 kg (194 lb; 13 st 12 lb)
- School: Coleg Sir Gâr

Rugby union career
- Position: Scrum-half
- Current team: Scarlets
Senior career
Years	Team	Apps	(Points)
2007–2014	Llanelli	74	(75)
2009–	Scarlets	272	(340)
- Correct as of 10 March 2024
International career
Years	Team	Apps	(Points)
2008	Wales U18	4	(5)
2010	Wales U20	7	(5)
2014–2024	Wales	77	(85)
2021	British and Irish Lions	4 (non cap)	(5)
- Correct as of 25 December 2025

David Gareth Davies (born 18 August 1990) is a Welsh professional rugby union player who plays as a scrum-half for United Rugby Championship club Scarlets and has represented the Wales national team.

== Club career ==
Davies went to Ysgol Gyfun Dyffryn Teifi in Llandysul before studying Sports Development and Coaching at Coleg Sir Gar in Llanelli. He has been with the Scarlets since he joined the academy in 2006. He has over 100 appearances for the Scarlets scoring over 100 points.

Davies was the top try scorer in the Pro12 for the 2013-14 season, scoring 10 tries. This caught the eye of Wales head coach Warren Gatland to select him for the summer tour of South Africa in 2014.

In December 2025, playing against Cardiff Blues in the URC, Davies scored two tries, received a yellow card, and was named player of the match.

== International career ==
Davies made his Wales international debut versus South Africa on 14 June 2014 as a second half replacement. He replaced scrum half Mike Phillips, he was selected on the bench for the second test against South Africa. On 20 March 2015 Davies played in the 61-20 win over Italy. He scored at least a try against Uruguay, England and Fiji in the three pool matches in 2015 Rugby World Cup. Davies was selected for the 2016 Six Nations squad - he started vs Ireland, Scotland, France and England, as well as being on the bench vs Italy. He scored a try against both Scotland and Italy.

Davies was called up as cover for the 2017 British & Irish Lions tour to New Zealand.

In 2019, Davies played in all five games as Wales won their first Six Nations Grand Slam since 2012. Beginning the campaign as a substitute in the first two matches against France and Italy, he regained his starting place against England, Scotland and Ireland.

In September 2019, it was announced that Davies had been selected as part of Wales' 31 man squad for the 2019 Rugby World Cup in Japan.

In May 2021, Davies was named as one of 3 scrum halves for the 2021 British & Irish Lions tour to South Africa, making four appearances and scoring one try.

On 17 October 2024, Davies announced his retirement from international rugby union.

== Personal life ==
Davies' nickname, Cawdor, is a reference to Cawdor Cars, the west Wales business owned by his father.

== Career statistics ==
=== List of international tries ===
No.	Date	Venue	Opponent	Score	Result	Competition
1	20 September 2015	Millennium Stadium, Cardiff, Wales	Uruguay	40–9	54–9	2015 Rugby World Cup
2	20 September 2015	Millennium Stadium, Cardiff, Wales	Uruguay	52–9	54–9	2015 Rugby World Cup
3	26 September 2015	Twickenham Stadium, London, England	England	23–25	28–25	2015 Rugby World Cup
4	1 October 2015	Millennium Stadium, Cardiff, Wales	Fiji	5–0	23–13	2015 Rugby World Cup
5	17 October 2015	Twickenham Stadium, London, England	South Africa	8–9	19–23	2015 Rugby World Cup
6	13 February 2016	Millennium Stadium, Cardiff, Wales	Scotland	5–0	27–23	2016 Six Nations Championship
7	19 March 2016	Millennium Stadium, Cardiff, Wales	Italy	65–14	67–14	2016 Six Nations Championship
8	12 November 2016	Millennium Stadium, Cardiff, Wales	Argentina	16–10	24–20	2016 end-of-year rugby union internationals
9	25 November 2017	Millennium Stadium, Cardiff, Wales	New Zealand	16–26	18–33	2017 end-of-year rugby union internationals
10	3 February 2018	Millennium Stadium, Cardiff, Wales	Scotland	5–0	34–7	2018 Six Nations Championship
11	24 February 2018	Lansdowne Road, Dublin, Ireland	Ireland	8–5	27–37	2018 Six Nations Championship
12	11 August 2019	Twickenham Stadium, London, England	England	5–14	19–33	2019 Rugby World Cup warm-up matches
13	29 September 2019	Ajinomoto Stadium, Tokyo, Japan	Australia	21–8	29–25	2019 Rugby World Cup
14	13 October 2019	Egao Kenko Stadium, Kumamoto, Japan	Uruguay	33–13	35–13	2019 Rugby World Cup
15	5 December 2020	Parc y Scarlets, Llanelli, Wales	Italy	22–18	38–18	Autumn Nations Cup
16	5 August 2023	Millennium Stadium, Cardiff, Wales	England	11–9	20–9	2023 Rugby World Cup warm-up matches
17	24 September 2023	Parc Olympique Lyonnais, Lyon, France	Australia	5–0	40–6	2023 Rugby World Cup

as of 24 September 2023
