= Angus O'Brien =

Welsh rugby union player

- Born: Angus O'Brien; 17 September 1994 (age 32) Caerleon, Newport, Wales
- Height: 180 cm (5 ft 11 in)
- Weight: 89 kg (14 st 0 lb)

Rugby union career
- Position(s): Fly-half; Fullback
- Current team: Dragons
Senior career
Years	Team	Apps	(Points)
2012–2014	Cross Keys	25	(142)
2014–2018	Dragons	70	(305)
2015	Newport RFC	1	(0)
2018–2022	Scarlets	40	(88)
2019	Llanelli RFC	1	(11)
2022–	Dragons	19	(47)
- Correct as of 19 March 2024
International career
Years	Team	Apps	(Points)
2014	Wales U20	7	(44)

Angus O'Brien (born 17 September 1994) is a Welsh rugby union player who plays Dragons RFC. He can play as outside half and fullback. O'Brien is a Wales under-20 international.

Angus O’Brien played club rugby for Caerleon RFC at Junior level before beginning his Senior career.

O'Brien made his debut for the Dragons regional team on 12 September 2014 aged 19 versus the Ospreys, kicking 4 penalties in a 15–17 defeat.

O'Brien was released by the Dragons at the end of the 2017–18 season and joined the Scarlets.

Ahead of the 2022–2023, O'Brien was re-signed by the Dragons.

He signed a new "multi-year" contract with the Dragons in April 2024.
