= Dan Davis (rugby union) =

Welsh rugby player (born 1998)

- Born: 17 September 1998 (age 28) Oxford, England
- Height: 181 cm (5 ft 11 in)
- Weight: 96 kg (15 st 2 lb)
- School: Coleg Sir Gar
- University: Swansea University

Rugby union career
- Position: Openside flanker
- Current team: Scarlets
Senior career
| Years | Team | Apps | (Points) |
| 2017– | Scarlets | 49 | (30) |
- Correct as of 9 December 2023
International career
| Years | Team | Apps | (Points) |
| 2018 | Wales U20 | 6 | (5) |
- Correct as of 15 December 2022

Dan Davis (born 17 September 1998) is a Welsh rugby union player. A flanker, he plays rugby for the Scarlets. Davis is a Wales U20 international.

== Club career ==
Davis came up through the Scarlets U16 and U18 ranks, having played for Llandeilo RFC in his youth career. He played at centre and back row, before focussing on the latter. Davis made his competitive debut on 12 November 2017 against Exeter Chiefs in the Anglo-Welsh Cup. In 2018, he scored his first try in his European debut, a late effort against Ulster.

Following his debut season in 2019, Davis signed his first professional contract with the Scarlets.

Davis was voted Supporters Player of the Month for January 2023.

Davis signed a contract extension with the Scarlets on 8 March 2024. Davis made his 100th appearance for the Scarlets in May 2026, and signed a further extension shortly after.

== International career ==
Previously involved with the Wales U18 team, Davis made his U20 debut in 2018.

== Personal life ==
Davis was born in England to English parents, but moved to Wales at the age of four. Prior to playing rugby, Davis was involved in the Cardiff City F.C. academy, playing as a centre-back, before moving to rugby full-time at 13. Davis balanced his burgeoning rugby career with his studies, attaining a degree in sports science at Swansea University.
