= Johnny McNicholl =

New Zealand-born rugby player (born 1990)

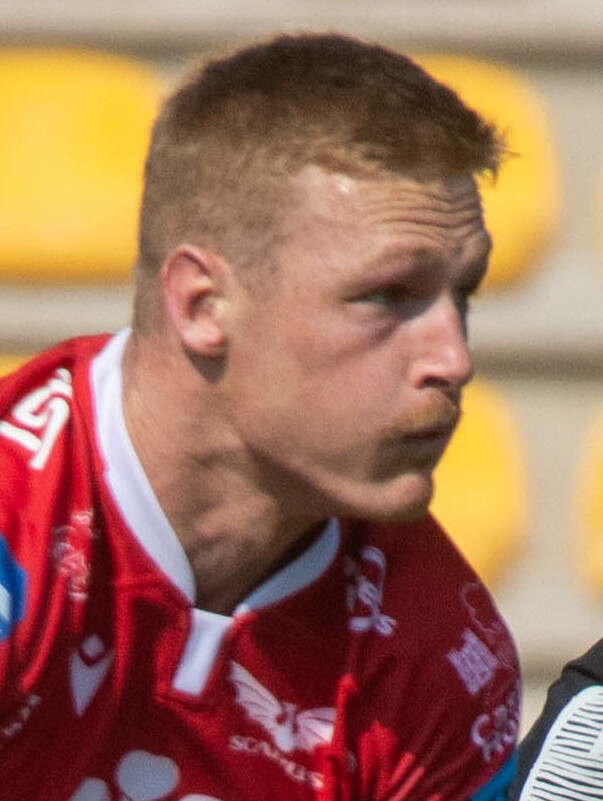
- Born: Johnny McNicholl; 24 September 1990 (age 36) Christchurch, New Zealand
- Height: 1.85 m (6 ft 1 in)
- Weight: 96 kg (15 st 2 lb)
- School: Cashmere High School

Rugby union career
- Position(s): Wing; Fullback
Senior career
Years	Team	Apps	(Points)
2014–16 2024-	Crusaders	56	(110)
2016−24	Scarlets	123	(280)
- Correct as of 2 May 2026
Provincial / State sides
Years	Team	Apps	(Points)
2011–16	Canterbury	68	(170)
- Correct as of 29 April 2026
International career
Years	Team	Apps	(Points)
2020-24	Wales	10	(0)
- Correct as of 12 October 2025

Johnny McNicholl (born 24 September 1990) is a New Zealand born rugby union player who previously played as a Winger or fullback for the Scarlets regional side in the Pro14 league and the Wales national team. As of March 2024 McNicholl rejoined the Crusaders.

== Career ==
McNicholl was a stand-out performer in the 2012 National Provincial Championship, heading the Top tryscorers list with 10, three ahead of his nearest rival. His consistent ability to cross the line drew interest from new Blues coach John Kirwan, but McNicholl, who played his club rugby for Sydenham in the Christchurch Metro competition, opted to commit to the Crusaders.

McNicholl was a member of the Crusaders Wider Training Squad in 2012 and subsequently promoted to the senior squad for 2013.

== International ==
In November 2019 McNicholl was named in the Wales squad for the first time after qualifying for Wales through the residency rule. At the age of 29 he made his debut for Wales in the starting line up for the uncapped international against the Barbarians on 30 November 2019. He scored a debut try in the 44-33 Wales win. On 15 January 2020 he was also called up for Wales' 2020 Six Nations Championship squad. He made his capped debut for Wales 1 February 2020 in the starting lineup for the Six Nations 42–0 win against Italy.
