= Paul Asquith =

Australian rugby player (born 1993)

- Born: Paul Asquith; 12 August 1993 (age 33) Wollongong, New South Wales, Australia
- Height: 1.83 m (6 ft 0 in)
- Weight: 94 kg (14 st 11 lb)

Rugby union career
- Position(s): Inside/Outside Centre; Wing
Amateur team(s)
Years	Team	Apps	(Points)
1999-2009	Kiama		
Senior career
Years	Team	Apps	(Points)
2012−17	Southern Districts	42	(120)
2014−17	Greater Sydney Rams	15	(68)
2017−21	Scarlets	79	(94)
- Correct as of 25 August 2022
Super Rugby
Years	Team	Apps	(Points)
2016	Rebels	3	(0)
- Correct as of 21 July 2016
International career
Years	Team	Apps	(Points)
2012-14	Australia Sevens	43	(74)
- Correct as of 18 June 2017

Paul Asquith (born 12 August 1993) is an Australian professional rugby union player. His primary position is centre, but is also an accomplished fullback who can also play on the wing.

== Career ==
Asquith played his junior Rugby union for Kiama, New South Wales and junior Rugby league for his home town Jamberoo, New South Wales as well as Kiama. He was chosen for the St George Dragons S. G. Ball Cup team in 2010 before moving to Rugby sevens in 2012. He played 43 games for Australia during the 2012–13 and 2013–14 seasons.

He made his debut for the Rebels against the Stormers in a 57–31 defeat at AAMI Park coming on as a replacement for Jonah Placid who went off injured in the process of scoring a try. He plays his club rugby for Southern Districts in Sydney and also for the Greater Sydney Rams in the National Rugby Championship.

In July 2017, he joined Scarlets in Wales for the 2017-18 season. He played all three trial games and made his Pro14 debut off the bench again in the first round against the Southern Kings and scored his first try in the second round against Zebre. He returned to Australia after four years with the Scarlets. Asquith played 79 games scoring 17 tries and 3 penalty goals
