= Danny Drake =

New Zealand rugby player (born 1995)

- Born: Danny Drake; 25 March 1995 (age 31) Leytonstone, London, England
- Height: 197 cm (6 ft 6 in)
- Weight: 113 kg (17 st 11 lb)

Rugby union career
- Position: Lock
Senior career
| Years | Team | Apps | (Points) |
| 2018 | North Harbour | 4 | (0) |
| 2019–2021 | Llanelli | 9 | (5) |
Provincial / State sides
| Years | Team | Apps | (Points) |
| 2019-2021 | Scarlets | 2 | (0) |
| 2020 | → Gloucester | 2 | (0) |

Danny Drake (born 25 March 1995) is a New Zealand rugby union player who last played for the Scarlets in the Pro14 competition. His position of choice is lock.
