= Dylan Evans (rugby union) =

Australian rugby union player

- Born: Dylan Evans; 25 January 1989 (age 37) Maitland, New South Wales, Australia
- Height: 185 cm (6 ft 1 in)
- Weight: 117 kg (18 st 6 lb)

Rugby union career
- Position: Loosehead Prop
- Current team: Scarlets
Senior career
Years	Team	Apps	(Points)
2015-	Llanelli RFC	7	(0)
- Correct as of 24 August 2020
Provincial / State sides
Years	Team	Apps	(Points)
2015-	Scarlets	54	(0)
2020	→ Glasgow Warriors	7	(0)
- Correct as of 19 May 2022

Dylan Evans (born 25 January 1989) is an Australian-born, Welsh-qualified, rugby union player who most recently played for the Scarlets at prop.

Evans made his debut for the Scarlets in 2015 having previously played Newcastle RFC, NSW Country as well as playing rugby for Sydney University, coming through the Brumbies Academy and completing a preseason with the Melbourne Rebels.

On 21 August 2020 it was announced that he joined Glasgow Warriors on a short-term loan deal. He was named straight in the 23 to play Edinburgh Rugby in the 1872 Cup.
