= Kieran Hardy =

Welsh rugby union player (born 1995)

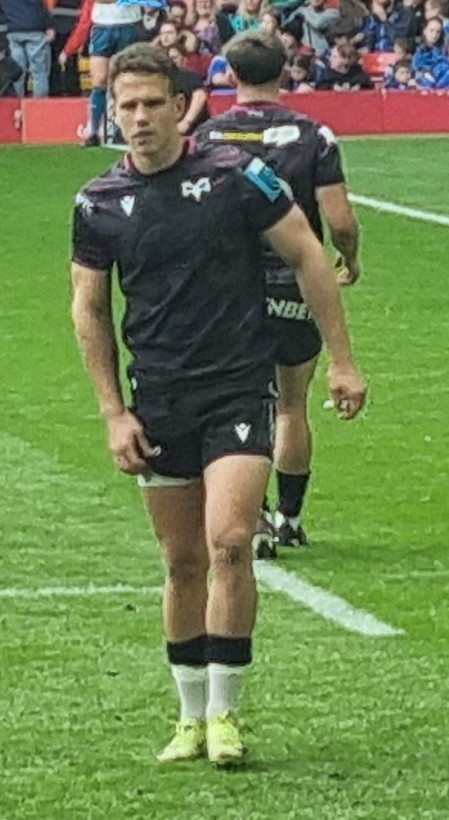
- Judgement Day 2025
- Full name: Kieran Richard Hardy
- Born: 30 November 1995 (age 30) Carmarthen, Wales
- Height: 1.86 m (6 ft 1 in)
- Weight: 90 kg (198 lb; 14 st 2 lb)
- School: Ysgol Maes Y Gwendraeth

Rugby union career
- Position: Scrum-half
- Current team: Ospreys
Senior career
Years	Team	Apps	(Points)
2013–2016	Carmarthen Quins	55	(40)
2014–2016	Scarlets	6	(0)
2016–2018	Jersey Reds	55	(85)
2018–2024	Scarlets	98	(120)
2024–	Ospreys	23	(55)
- Correct as of 16 March 2024
International career
Years	Team	Apps	(Points)
2015	Wales U20	5	(0)
2020–	Wales	31	(40)
- Correct as of 16 March 2024

Kieran Richard Hardy (born 30 November 1995) is a Welsh professional rugby union player who plays as a scrum-half for United Rugby Championship club Ospreys and the Wales national team.

== Club career ==
Hardy first played for local side Pontyberem RFC until the age of 16. He began his professional career with Carmarthen Quins, while progressing through the age grade ranks with the Scarlets. Despite making his professional debut with the Scarlets in 2014, he departed the club in 2016 in order to gain experience and game time, as it was limited with competition in the scrum half jersey. Hardy subsequently joined RFU Championship club Jersey Reds, along with Scarlet teammate Regan King.

In his first season with Jersey, Hardy helped the club reach the final of the British and Irish Cup. Jersey lost to Munster A 29–28, despite Hardy scoring a try in the fixture. Hardy extended his contract for one more season, in 2017.

In 2018 Hardy was voted Player of the Season, before departing Jersey. Hardy rejoined the Scarlets ahead of the 2018–19 Pro14 season, following the departure of Aled Davies.

Hardy was voted Breakthrough Player of the Season in his first term back in Llanelli, scoring seven tries in 18 matches. He was voted Player of the Month for October 2019, scoring multiple impactful tries early in the season. Hardy signed an extension in August 2020. Ahead of the 2024–25 United Rugby Championship, Hardy signed with the Ospreys.

== International career ==
In 2015, Hardy was selected for Wales U20, featuring in the 2015 Six Nations Under 20s Championship and 2015 World Rugby Under 20 Championship.

On 6 October 2020 Hardy was named in the senior Wales squad for the 2020 Autumn Nations Cup. He made his debut for Wales on the 18 November 2020 in the starting line up for the 18-0 win against Georgia. His halfback partner for the fixture was Callum Sheedy, who played alongside Hardy for Jersey in 2017 while on loan from Bristol. Hardy scored his first international try on 5 December 2020, against Italy.

Hardy retained his place in the Welsh squad for the 2021 Six Nations. He made his first Six Nations appearance on 13 February 2021, coming off the bench against Scotland. Hardy was selected to start the following match against England, and scored a try as Wales won 40–24, securing the Triple Crown. After suffering a hamstring injury during the match, Hardy was subsequently ruled out of the remainder of the tournament, as Wales won the championship title.

Upon returning to fitness, Hardy was once against selected for the Wales squad for the summer tests against Canada and Argentina. Hardy featured in the 2021 end-of-year rugby union internationals, and scored his third test try during the match against Fiji.

During the 2022 Six Nations, Hardy once again scored against England, appearing three times off the bench during the tournament. That summer he was selected for the 2022 Wales rugby union tour of South Africa, and started all three tests. During the tour, Wales won the second test 13–12, securing a first ever win over the Springboks in South Africa.

Hardy was selected for the 2022 end-of-year rugby union internationals, coming off the bench against New Zealand and Australia. Hardy retained his place in the squad for the 2023 Six Nations, having been selected by returning head coach Warren Gatland.

Hardy was named in the squad for the 2026 Six Nations by Steve Tandy.

== Career statistics ==
=== List of international tries ===
No.	Date	Venue	Opponent	Score	Result	Competition
1	5 December 2020	Parc y Scarlets, Llanelli, Wales	Italy	5–0	38–18	Autumn Nations Cup
2	27 February 2021	Millennium Stadium, Cardiff, Wales	England	22–11	40–24	2021 Six Nations Championship
3	14 November 2021	Millennium Stadium, Cardiff, Wales	Fiji	12–10	38–23	2021 end-of-year rugby union internationals
4	26 February 2022	Twickenham Stadium, London, England	England	17–23	19–23	2022 Six Nations Championship

as of 26 February 2022
