= 2012–13 Pro12 =

12th edition of the Celtic League / Pro 12 / Pro 14 of rugby union

- Countries: Ireland; Italy; Scotland; Wales
- Date: 31 August 2012 – 25 May 2013
- Champions: (Ireland) Leinster (3rd title)
- Runners-up: (Ireland) Ulster
- Matches played: 135
- Attendance: 1,106,873 (average 8,199 per match)
- Tries scored: 536 (average 4 per match)
- Top point scorer: Ian Madigan (Leinster) (186 points)
- Top try scorer: Tim Visser (Edinburgh) (11 tries)

Official website
- www.rabodirectpro12.com

The 2012–13 Pro12 League (also known as the RaboDirect Pro12 for sponsorship reasons) was the 12th season of the rugby union competition originally known as the Celtic League, the third with its current 12-team format, and the second with RaboDirect as title sponsor.

Ospreys were the defending champions, but they failed to qualify for the end-of-season playoffs.

The twelve teams that competed were the four Irish teams, Munster, Leinster, Connacht and Ulster; two Scottish teams, Edinburgh and Glasgow Warriors; four Welsh teams, Cardiff Blues, Newport Gwent Dragons, Ospreys and Scarlets; and two Italian teams, Benetton Treviso and newly created Zebre.

The title was won by Leinster, defeating Ulster 24–18 in the final.

== Changes for the season ==
=== Italy ===
Zebre replaced Aironi Rugby after they had their licence revoked by the Italian Rugby Federation for financial reasons. Roberto Manghi will become their Head coach for their début season.

=== Scotland ===
Ahead of this season Glasgow Warriors moved home, leaving their previous home of Firhill in the Maryhill area of the city for the smaller Scotstoun Stadium. They also came into the season with a new head coach, with former Scotland stand-off Gregor Townsend replacing Sean Lineen.

=== Ireland ===
New Zealander Rob Penney replaced Tony McGahan as director of rugby at Munster, and fellow New Zealander Mark Anscombe replaced Brian McLaughlin as head coach of Ulster. In Munster, Paul O'Connell stood down as captain, with Doug Howlett announced as his replacement.

=== Wales ===
The Welsh regions saw a number of changes in coaching personnel, as Phil Davies took over the reins at Cardiff Blues, Steve Tandy replaced Sean Holley as Ospreys head coach and former Ireland international Simon Easterby succeeding Nigel Davies at the Scarlets, after he departed to take over at English Premiership side Gloucester. Scarlets also announced that Rob McCusker would replace Matthew Rees as captain.

On 28 August 2012, the Welsh Rugby Union announced a new annual event which will feature all four regions playing in a doubleheader at Millennium Stadium (similar to the long-established London Double Header in the English Premiership). The first of these events took place on 30 March 2013, with an initial contract set to run for four years.

== Teams ==
Location of 2012–13 Pro12 teams in Great Britain and Ireland.	Location of 2012–13 Pro12 teams in Italy
Winners; 2nd–4th place; Other teams.

Team	Coach	Captain	Stadium	Capacity
(Italy) Benetton Treviso	(South Africa) Franco Smith	(Italy) Antonio Pavanello	Stadio Comunale di Monigo	6,700
(Wales) Cardiff Blues	(Wales) Phil Davies	(Wales) Andries Pretorius	Cardiff Arms Park	12,500
(Ireland) Connacht	(Ireland) Eric Elwood	(Ireland) Gavin Duffy	Galway Sportsgrounds	7,500
(Scotland) Edinburgh	(Ireland) Michael Bradley	(Scotland) Greig Laidlaw	Murrayfield Stadium	67,144 (Note: Although Murrayfield's full capacity is 67,144, only the lower section of the West Stand, with a capacity of 12,464, is generally opened for Edinburgh fixtures.)
(Scotland) Glasgow Warriors	(Scotland) Gregor Townsend	(Scotland) Alastair Kellock	Scotstoun Stadium	9,708
(Ireland) Leinster	(New Zealand) Josef Schmidt	(Ireland) Leo Cullen	RDS Arena; Aviva Stadium	18,500; 51,700
(Ireland) Munster	(New Zealand) Rob Penney	(New Zealand) Doug Howlett	Thomond Park; Musgrave Park	26,500; 9,251
(Wales) Newport Gwent Dragons	(Wales) Darren Edwards	(Wales) Lewis Evans	Rodney Parade	11,676
(Wales) Ospreys	(Wales) Steve Tandy	(Wales) Alun Wyn Jones	Liberty Stadium	20,532
(Wales) Scarlets	(Ireland) Simon Easterby	(Wales) Rob McCusker	Parc y Scarlets	14,870
(Ireland) Ulster	(New Zealand) Mark Anscombe	(South Africa) Johann Muller	Ravenhill	12,300
(Italy) Zebre	(Italy) Roberto Manghi	(Italy) Gonzalo Garcia	Stadio XXV Aprile (Note: Zebre also played one of their matches at Stadio del Tricolore in Reggio Emilia.)	3,500

== Table ==
Pro12 table
	Club	Played	Won	Drawn	Lost	Points For	Points Against	Points Difference	Tries For	Tries Against	Try Bonus	Losing Bonus	Points
1	(Ireland) Ulster (RU)	22	17	1	4	577	348	+229	62	33	8	3	81
2	(Ireland) Leinster (CH)	22	17	0	5	585	386	+199	63	46	9	1	78
3	(Scotland) Glasgow Warriors (SF)	22	16	0	6	541	324	+217	66	30	9	3	76
4	(Wales) Scarlets (SF)	22	15	0	7	436	406	+30	41	37	3	3	66
5	(Wales) Ospreys	22	14	1	7	471	342	+129	48	25	2	2	62
6	(Ireland) Munster	22	11	1	10	442	389	+53	46	34	4	4	54
7	(Italy) Benetton Treviso	22	10	2	10	414	450	–36	45	44	4	2	50
8	(Ireland) Connacht	22	8	1	13	358	422	–64	32	43	1	3	38
9	(Wales) Cardiff Blues	22	8	0	14	348	487	–139	28	51	1	5	38
10	(Scotland) Edinburgh	22	7	0	15	399	504	–105	35	51	1	7	36
11	(Wales) Newport Gwent Dragons	22	6	0	16	358	589	–231	31	72	1	3	28
12	(Italy) Zebre	22	0	0	22	291	573	–282	29	60	1	9	10
If teams are level at any stage, tiebreakers are applied in the following order: 1. number of matches won; 2. the difference between points for and points against; 3. the number of tries scored; 4. the most points scored; 5. the difference between tries for and tries against; 6. the fewest red cards received; 7. the fewest yellow cards received.
Green background (rows 1 to 4) are play-off places. Qualification for the Heineken Cup is based on each country's allocation, i.e. three highest–ranked Irish teams, three highest–ranked Welsh teams, both Italian teams and both Scottish teams. Leinster won the Amlin Challenge Cup, giving Ireland an extra Heineken Cup place that passed to Connacht. Updated 17 May 2013. Source: RaboDirect PRO12

== Fixtures ==
All times are local.

=== Round 1 ===
31 August 2012
19:00

(1 BP) Newport Gwent Dragons (Wales)	37–6	(Italy) Zebre
Try: Tuilagi 14' c Harries 19' c D. Evans (2) 27' c, 39' c Con: Prydie (4/4); Pen: Prydie (2/2) 10', 68'; Drop: S. Jones (1/1) 16'	Report	Pen: Orquera (2/3) 23', 38'

Rodney Parade
Attendance: 4,540
Referee: George Clancy (IRFU)

31 August 2012
19:05

Ulster (Ireland)	18–10	(Scotland) Glasgow Warriors
Try: Allen 38' m Gilroy 45' c Con: O'Connor (1/2); Pen: O'Connor (2/5) 11', 80'	Report	Try: Seymour 68' c Con: Jackson (1/1); Pen: Weir (1/1) 21'

Ravenhill
Attendance: 8,108
Referee: Marius Mitrea (FIR)

31 August 2012
20:05

Benetton Treviso (Italy)	12–6	(Wales) Ospreys (1 BP)
Pen: Burton (4/5) 7', 11', 14', 31'	Report	Pen: Biggar (2/5) 18', 46'

Stadio Comunale di Monigo
Attendance: 3,500
Referee: John Lacey (IRFU)

1 September 2012
17:00

(1 BP) Connacht (Ireland)	9–13	(Wales) Cardiff Blues
Pen: Nikora (3/5) 45', 66', 69'	Report	Try: Jones 30' c Con: Sweeney (1/1); Pen: Sweeney (2/2) 20', 25'

Sportsgrounds
Attendance: 3,869
Referee: Andrew McMenemy (SRU)

1 September 2012
18:30

(1 BP) Scarlets (Wales)	45–20	(Ireland) Leinster
Try: S. Williams 14' c Li. Williams 26' c North (2) 42' m, 73' c Fenby (2) 48' c, 76' c Murphy 64' m Con: Thomas (3/4); Priestland (2/3)	Report	Try: Toner 62' c Madigan 80' c Con: Madigan (2/2); Pen: Madigan (2/2) 4', 38'

Parc y Scarlets
Attendance: 6,559
Referee: Neil Paterson (SRU)

1 September 2012
20:00

(1 BP) Edinburgh (Scotland)	18–23	(Ireland) Munster
Try: T. Visser (3) 13' m, 30' m, 74' m Pen: Laidlaw (1/1) 51'	Report	Try: Keatley 39' c O'Dea 58' c Con: Keatley (2/2); Pen: Keatley (3/4) 27', 43', 69'

Murrayfield
Attendance: 4,050
Referee: Leighton Hodges (WRU)

=== Round 2 ===
7 September 2012
19:05

(1 BP) Cardiff Blues (Wales)	19–21	(Scotland) Edinburgh
Try: Cuthbert 50' c Con: Halfpenny (1/1); Pen: Halfpenny (4/4) 23', 34', 38', 57'	Report	Try: T. Visser 24' m penalty try 60' c Con: Laidlaw (1/2); Pen: Laidlaw (2/3) 3', 53'; Drop: Laidlaw (1/1) 78'

Cardiff Arms Park
Attendance: 7,412
Referee: David Wilkinson (IRFU)

7 September 2012
19:05

Zebre (Italy)	17–30	(Ireland) Connacht
Try: Pace 44' c van Schalkwyk 59' c Con: Orquera (2/2); Pen: Orquera (1/2) 74'	Report	Try: O'Halloran 30' c Naoupu 57' c McCarthy 80' c Con: Nikora (3/3); Pen: Nikora (3/3) 11', 39', 51'

Stadio XXV Aprile
Attendance: 2,025
Referee: Ian Davies (WRU)

7 September 2012
19:35

(1 BP) Glasgow Warriors (Scotland)	13–18	(Wales) Scarlets
Try: Cusiter 76' c Con: Weir (1/1); Pen: Jackson (2/4) 6', 39'	Report	Try: Shingler 23' m Fenby 35' m North 57' m Pen: Priestland (1/5) 44'

Scotstoun
Attendance: 4,348
Referee: Dudley Phillips (IRFU)

7 September 2012
20:00

Munster (Ireland)	19–6	(Italy) Benetton Treviso
Try: Howlett 6' c Con: Keatley (1/1); Pen: Keatley (4/4) 14', 24', 30', 51'	Report	Pen: Di Bernardo (2/2) 3', 64'

Thomond Park
Attendance: 15,642
Referee: Andrew McMenemy (SRU)

8 September 2012
18:15

(1 BP) Leinster (Ireland)	45–25	(Wales) Newport Gwent Dragons
Try: Conway 7' c Marshall 33' c Jennings 46' c Carr 49' m Macken 80' c Con: Madigan (3/4); Nacewa (1/1); Pen: Madigan (4/4) 6', 16', 29', 40'	Report	Try: S. Jones 12' c Prydie 52' m D. Evans 59' c Con: Prydie (2/3); Pen: Prydie (2/2) 5', 27'

Royal Dublin Society
Attendance: 15,724
Referee: Marius Mitrea (FIR)

8 September 2012
18:30

(1 BP) Ospreys (Wales)	13–16	(Ireland) Ulster
Try: Dirksen 24' c Con: Morgan (1/1); Pen: Morgan (2/3) 47', 53'	Report	Try: P. Marshall 75' c Con: Jackson (1/1); Pen: O'Connor (1/4) 32'; Jackson (2/2) 56', 68'

Liberty Stadium
Attendance: 8,566
Referee: John Lacey (IRFU)

=== Round 3 ===
14 September 2012
19:05

Ospreys (Wales)	10–28	(Scotland) Glasgow Warriors
Try: Evans 51' c Con: Biggar (1/1); Pen: Biggar (1/1) 61'	Report	Try: Van der Merwe (2) 3' m, 54' c Fusaro 28' c Con: Weir (2/3); Pen: Weir (2/3) 13', 46'; Jackson (1/1) 75'

Liberty Stadium
Attendance: 7,159
Referee: Leo Colgan (IRFU)

14 September 2012
19:05

Ulster (Ireland)	20–19	(Ireland) Munster (1 BP)
Try: Payne 51' m Pen: Jackson (5/6) 16', 36', 40', 44', 69'	Report	Try: Earls 38' c Con: Keatley (1/1); Pen: Keatley (2/2) 3', 8'; Drop: Keatley (2/2) 13', 67'

Ravenhill
Attendance: 10,397
Referee: Alain Rolland (IRFU)

14 September 2012
19:30

(1 BP) Edinburgh (Scotland)	41–10	(Italy) Zebre
Try: Cox 22' c T. Visser (2) 38' c, 80' c Ford 43' c penalty try 59' c Con: Laidlaw (5/5); Pen: Laidlaw (2/2) 7', 30'	Report	Try: Sinoti 69' c Con: Halangahu (1/1); Pen: Halangahu (1/1) 27'

Murrayfield
Attendance: 3,541
Referee: Giuseppe Vivarini (FIR)

15 September 2012
15:00

Connacht (Ireland)	11–24	(Wales) Scarlets (1 BP)
Try: Griffin 39' m Pen: Nikora (2/2) 10', 61'	Report	Try: J. Williams (2) 41' c, 52' m North 49' m J. Davies 80' c Con: Priestland (1/2); J. Williams (1/2)

Sportsgrounds
Attendance: 4,074
Referee: Neil Paterson (SRU)

15 September 2012
18:30

Newport Gwent Dragons (Wales)	5–16	(Wales) Cardiff Blues
Try: S. Jones 39' m	Report	Try: Cuthbert 47' c Con: Patchell (1/1); Pen: Patchell (3/5) 37', 76', 78'

Rodney Parade
Attendance: 7,331
Referee: Neil Hennessy (WRU)

15 September 2012
19:05

(1 BP) Benetton Treviso (Italy)	18–19	(Ireland) Leinster
Try: Barbieri 21' m Semenzato 77' c Con: Burton (1/1); Pen: Di Bernardo (1/2) 14'; Burton (1/1) 66'	Report	Try: O'Driscoll 44' c Con: J. Sexton (1/1); Pen: J. Sexton (3/4) 30', 58', 74'; Drop: J. Sexton (1/1) 79'

Stadio Comunale di Monigo
Attendance: 5,000
Referee: Ian Davies (WRU)

=== Round 4 ===
21 September 2012
19:05

(1 BP) Scarlets (Wales)	16–23	(Wales) Ospreys
Try: North 80' c Con: Priestland (1/1); Pen: Priestland (3/7) 3', 13', 48'	Report	Try: R. Jones 72' c Dirksen 75' c Con: Biggar (2/2); Pen: Biggar (3/4) 7', 18', 34'

Parc y Scarlets
Attendance: 14,111
Referee: Leighton Hodges (WRU)

21 September 2012
19:35

(1 BP) Glasgow Warriors (Scotland)	27–17	(Ireland) Connacht
Try: Lamont 18' m Murchie 25' c Van der Merwe (2) 46' c, 69' m Con: Wight (2/3); Pen: Wight (1/2) 2'	Report	Try: McCrea 31' c White 49' c Con: Jarvis (2/2); Pen: Jarvis (1/2) 40'

Scotstoun
Attendance: 3,646
Referee: Alain Rolland (IRFU)

21 September 2012
20:05

Zebre (Italy)	P–P	(Ireland) Ulster
	Postponed due to the death of Ulster player Nevin; Spence in a farming accident on 15 September.

Stadio XXV Aprile
Referee: Neil Paterson (SRU)

22 September 2012
18:15

Leinster (Ireland)	22–16	(Scotland) Edinburgh (1 BP)
Try: J. Sexton 8' c Macken (2) 57' m, 66' c Con: J. Sexton (2/3); Pen: J. Sexton (1/1) 16'	Report	Try: Nel 71' c Con: Laidlaw (1/1); Pen: Laidlaw (3/3) 23', 32', 61'

Royal Dublin Society
Attendance: 17,794
Referee: Neil Hennessy (WRU)

22 September 2012
18:30

(1 BP) Cardiff Blues (Wales)	34–18	(Italy) Benetton Treviso
Try: Fish 12' c Roberts 31' c Tovey 68' c Ma'afu 80' c Con: Patchell (4/4); Pen: Patchell (2/4) 10', 44'	Report	Try: Barbieri (2) 56' c, 72' m Con: Burton (1/2); Pen: Burton (2/2) 17', 66'

Cardiff Arms Park
Attendance: 8,138
Referee: Peter Fitzgibbon (IRFU)

22 September 2012
20:00

(1 BP) Munster (Ireland)	33–13	(Wales) Newport Gwent Dragons
Try: Keatley 2' c Ronan 13' c Murray 53' m Zebo 57' c O'Donnell 72' c Con: O'Gara (4/5)	Report	Try: D. Evans 62' c Con: Robling (1/1); Pen: Prydie (1/3) 16'; Robling (1/1) 40'

Thomond Park
Attendance: 15,064
Referee: Marius Mitrea (FIR)

=== Round 5 ===
28 September 2012
19:00

Newport Gwent Dragons (Wales)	32–12	(Scotland) Edinburgh
Try: Price 40' m Pen: Prydie (6/6) 13', 19', 25', 38', 42', 66'; Drop: S. Jones (3/3) 48', 62', 74'	Report	Try: Brown 11' c T. Visser 60' m Con: Leonard (1/2)

Rodney Parade
Attendance: 5,197
Referee: John Lacey (IRFU)

28 September 2012
19:05

Cardiff Blues (Wales)	19–48	(Ireland) Ulster (1 BP)
Try: Robinson 61' c Con: G. Davies (1/1); Pen: Tovey (3/3) 2', 9', 19'; G. Davies (1/1) 47'	Report	Try: Allen 18' c Williams (2) 29' c, 66' c Bowe (2) 48' m, 55' m Payne 53' c Trimble 77' c Con: Jackson (5/7); Pen: Jackson (1/3) 13'

Cardiff Arms Park
Attendance: 8,217
Referee: Marius Mitrea (FIR)

28 September 2012
19:35

Glasgow Warriors (Scotland)	22–19	(Italy) Zebre (1 BP)
Try: Swinson 21' c Van der Merwe 34' m Morrison 40' c Con: Jackson (2/3); Pen: Horne (1/1) 72'	Report	Try: Orquera 12' c Con: Orquera (1/1); Pen: Orquera (3/3) 5', 30', 46'; Garcia (1/2) 10'

Scotstoun
Attendance: 3,313
Referee: Leighton Hodges (WRU)

28 September 2012
20:00

(1 BP) Connacht (Ireland)	34–6	(Ireland) Leinster
Try: McSharry 14' c Vainikolo 23' c O'Halloran 36' m Naoupu 74' m Loughney 78' c Con: Parks (2/4); Nikora (1/1); Pen: Parks (1/1) 40'	Report	Pen: Madigan (2/3) 5', 17'

Sportsgrounds
Attendance: 5,813
Referee: Peter Fitzgibbon (IRFU)

29 September 2012
18:30

Ospreys (Wales)	30–15	(Ireland) Munster
Try: Fussell 21' c penalty try 54' c Hibbard 68' c Con: Biggar (3/3); Pen: Biggar (3/4) 11', 13', 47'	Report	Pen: O'Gara (4/4) 25', 40', 42', 58'; Keatley (1/1) 66'

Liberty Stadium
Attendance: 8,652
Referee: Dudley Phillips (IRFU)

29 September 2012
19:05

Benetton Treviso (Italy)	22–20	(Wales) Scarlets (1 BP)
Try: Ghiraldini 29' m Semenzato 51' c Barbieri 67' c Con: Di Bernardo (2/2); Pen: Di Bernardo (1/1) 80'	Report	Try: Fenby (2) 27' c, 37' c Con: Priestland (2/2); Pen: Priestland (1/2) 47'; Drop: Priestland (1/1) 13'

Stadio Comunale di Monigo
Attendance: 3,500
Referee: Andrew McMenemy (SRU)

=== Round 6 ===
5 October 2012
19:05

Scarlets (Wales)	24–13	(Wales) Newport Gwent Dragons
Try: Maule 26' c Stoddart 70' m Con: Thomas (1/1); Pen: Thomas (3/6) 16', 34', 38'; Priestland (1/1) 66'	Report	Try: Hughes 63' c Con: Prydie (1/1); Pen: S. Jones (1/2) 10'; Prydie (1/1) 60'

Parc y Scarlets
Attendance: 7,863
Referee: Nigel Owens (WRU)

5 October 2012
19:05

Ulster (Ireland)	25–0	(Ireland) Connacht
Try: penalty try 34' c Williams 40' c L. Marshall 78' m Con: Jackson (2/2); Pen: Jackson (2/2) 11', 60'	Report

Ravenhill
Attendance: 10,052
Referee: George Clancy (IRFU)

5 October 2012
19:05

Zebre (Italy)	16–34	(Wales) Ospreys
Try: Redolfini 43' c Con: Halangahu (1/1); Pen: Garcia (1/3) 11'; Halangahu (2/2) 40', 54'	Report	Try: Fussell 28' c Thomas 37' m Biggar 73' c Con: Biggar (2/3); Pen: Biggar (5/6) 6', 14', 20', 58', 61'

Stadio XXV Aprile
Attendance: 2,500
Referee: Dudley Phillips (IRFU)

5 October 2012
19:30

(1 BP) Edinburgh (Scotland)	22–27	(Italy) Benetton Treviso
Try: T. Visser 34' c Jones 57' m Fife 78' c Con: Laidlaw (2/3); Pen: Laidlaw (1/2) 4'	Report	Try: penalty try 29' c Barbieri (2) 40' c, 55' c Con: Di Bernardo (3/3); Pen: Di Bernardo (2/4) 38', 48'

Murrayfield
Attendance: 4,079
Referee: Matteo Liperini (FIR)

6 October 2012
18:30

Cardiff Blues (Wales)	3–18	(Scotland) Glasgow Warriors
Pen: Halfpenny (1/2) 39'	Report	Pen: Horne (6/7) 17', 25', 28', 34', 46', 58'

Cardiff Arms Park
Attendance: 7,442
Referee: Giuseppe Vivarini (FIR)

6 October 2012
18:30

Leinster (Ireland)	30–21	(Ireland) Munster
Try: Strauss 4' c Madigan 21' c O'Driscoll 53' c Con: J. Sexton (3/3); Pen: J. Sexton (3/5) 13', 33', 50'	Report	Try: P. O'Mahony 6' m Murray 67' c Con: Keatley (1/1); Pen: O'Gara (3/4) 10', 15', 36'

Aviva Stadium
Attendance: 46,280
Referee: Leighton Hodges (WRU)

=== Round 7 ===
26 October 2012
19:05

Newport Gwent Dragons (Wales)	19–46	(Ireland) Ulster (1 BP)
Try: Tuilagi 29' c Con: Prydie (1/1); Pen: Prydie (4/5) 2', 10', 35', 52'	Report	Try: Court 16' c Williams 32' c Pienaar 37' m Cave 60' c Trimble 61' c Payne 78' c Con: Pienaar (5/6); Pen: Pienaar (2/4) 42', 49'

Rodney Parade
Attendance: 5,057
Referee: Peter Fitzgibbon (IRFU)

26 October 2012
19:35

(1 BP) Edinburgh (Scotland)	28–29	(Wales) Scarlets (1 BP)
Try: T. Visser 8' c Con: Leonard (1/1); Pen: Leonard (7/8) 19', 25', 29', 36', 54', 59', 66'	Report	Try: North (2) 14' c, 32' m Reynolds 20' c G. Davies 40' c Con: Thomas (3/4); Pen: Priestland (1/1) 78'

Murrayfield
Attendance: 3,754
Referee: Marius Mitrea (FIR)

26 October 2012
19:45

(1 BP) Munster (Ireland)	29–3	(Italy) Zebre
Try: Hanrahan (2) 46' c, 67' c Jones 56' c O'Dea 76' m Con: Keatley (3/4); Pen: Keatley (1/2) 26'	Report	Pen: Halangahu (1/2) 39'

Thomond Park
Attendance: 14,738
Referee: Neil Hennessy (WRU)

27 October 2012
14:30

(1 BP) Ospreys (Wales)	26–9	(Ireland) Connacht
Try: Walker 15' c Tipuric 37' m Thomas 42' c Fotuali'i 72' c Con: Biggar (3/4)	Report	Pen: Parks (3/4) 31', 34', 52'

Liberty Stadium
Attendance: 8,231
Referee: George Clancy (IRFU)

27 October 2012
18:30

(1 BP) Leinster (Ireland)	59–22	(Wales) Cardiff Blues
Try: Strauss 4' c Madigan 7' c Heaslip (2) 18' c, 30' c D. Kearney 26' c Healy 35' m Murphy 42' c Browne 54' c Carr 80' m Con: J. Sexton (7/9)	Report	Try: Cuthbert 51' m Halfpenny 64' c James 69' c Con: Halfpenny (2/3); Pen: Halfpenny (1/1) 12'

Royal Dublin Society
Attendance: 17,236
Referee: Ian Davies (WRU)

27 October 2012
19:05

Benetton Treviso (Italy)	13–24	(Scotland) Glasgow Warriors
Try: Vosawai 22' c Con: Burton (1/1); Pen: Burton (1/3) 29'; Botes (1/1) 63'	Report	Try: Seymour (2) 65' c, 69' m Con: Wight (1/2); Pen: Jackson (3/4) 12', 16', 43'; Wight (1/1) 57'

Stadio Comunale di Monigo
Attendance: 3,000
Referee: Leo Colgan (IRFU)

=== Round 8 ===
2 November 2012
19:05

(1 BP) Cardiff Blues (Wales)	18–24	(Ireland) Munster
Try: Hewitt 46' c Jones 64' m Con: Sweeney (1/2); Pen: Tovey (1/2) 8'; Sweeney (1/1) 59'	Report	Try: O'Donnell (2) 12' c, 61' c Laulala 78' c Con: O'Gara (3/3); Pen: O'Gara (1/1) 29'

Cardiff Arms Park
Attendance: 8,064
Referee: Andrew McMenemy (SRU)

2 November 2012
19:05

(1 BP) Ulster (Ireland)	45–20	(Scotland) Edinburgh
Try: penalty try 29' c Payne (2) 31' c, 66' c Pienaar 35' c Wilson 57' c Gilroy 80' c Con: Pienaar (6/6); Pen: O'Connor (1/1) 15'	Report	Try: Brown (2) 11' c, 37' c Con: Hunter (2/2); Pen: Hunter (2/2) 20', 42'

Ravenhill
Attendance: 11,078
Referee: Nigel Owens (WRU)

2 November 2012
19:30

(1 BP) Glasgow Warriors (Scotland)	37–6	(Wales) Newport Gwent Dragons
Try: Murchie 14' c Reid 28' c Ryder 43' m Seymour (2) 62' m, 68' c Con: Wight (3/5); Pen: Wight (2/2) 5', 34'	Report	Pen: Prydie (2/3) 31', 37'

Scotstoun
Attendance: 3,317
Referee: Marius Mitrea (FIR)

3 November 2012
17:00

Connacht (Ireland)	18–3	(Italy) Benetton Treviso
Try: Poolman 28' c Duffy 74' m Con: Parks (1/2); Pen: Parks (2/3) 6', 14'	Report	Pen: Di Bernardo (1/2) 61'

Sportsgrounds
Attendance: 4,112
Referee: Leighton Hodges (WRU)

3 November 2012
18:30

Scarlets (Wales)	22–13	(Italy) Zebre
Try: K. Phillips 73' c Con: Thomas (1/1); Pen: Thomas (5/6) 36', 48', 54', 67', 78'	Report	Try: Pratichetti 61' c Con: Halangahu (1/1); Pen: Halangahu (2/5) 13', 38'

Parc y Scarlets
Attendance: 5,757
Referee: Dudley Phillips (IRFU)

4 November 2012
16:00

Ospreys (Wales)	19–10	(Ireland) Leinster
Try: Walker 62' c Con: Morgan (1/1); Pen: Morgan (3/4) 15', 22', 40'; Drop: Morgan (1/1) 75'	Report	Try: Auva'a 8' c Con: Madigan (1/1); Pen: Madigan (1/3) 4'

Liberty Stadium
Attendance: 9,246
Referee: John Lacey (IRFU)

=== Round 4 rescheduled match ===
18 November 2012
15:00

(2 BP) Zebre (Italy)	25–27	(Ireland) Ulster
Try: Tebaldi 11' m Halangahu 44' m van Schalkwyk (2) 54' m, 65' c Con: Halangahu (1/4); Pen: Halangahu (1/2) 40'	Report	Try: Wallace 58' m penalty try 75' c Con: O'Connor (1/2); Pen: O'Connor (5/5) 10', 27', 34', 48', 63'

Stadio XXV Aprile
Attendance: 2,550
Referee: Neil Paterson (SRU)

This match – originally scheduled to be held during Round 4, on 21 September 2012 – was postponed due to the death of Ulster player Nevin Spence in a farming accident on 15 September.

=== Round 9 ===
23 November 2012
19:00

Newport Gwent Dragons (Wales)	14–3	(Ireland) Connacht
Try: Leach 37' m Pen: Prydie (3/4) 25', 46', 52'	Report	Pen: Parks (1/2) 6'

Rodney Parade
Attendance: 4,168
Referee: Giuseppe Vivarini (FIR)

23 November 2012
19:05

(1 BP) Benetton Treviso (Italy)	15–16	(Ireland) Ulster
Try: Williams 8' c Nitoglia 40' m Con: Di Bernardo (1/2); Pen: Di Bernardo (1/3) 28'	Report	Try: Nelson 24' c Con: O'Connor (1/1); Pen: O'Connor (3/4) 20', 49', 58'

Stadio Comunale di Monigo
Attendance: 3,500
Referee: Peter Allan (SRU)

23 November 2012
19:05

Edinburgh (Scotland)	23–13	(Wales) Ospreys
Try: Nel 34' m Pen: Hunter (6/8) 23', 47', 53', 59', 64', 80'	Report	Try: Morgan 37' c Con: Morgan (1/1); Pen: Morgan (2/2) 16', 31'

Murrayfield
Attendance: 3,128
Referee: David Wilkinson (IRFU)

23 November 2012
19:35

(1 BP) Glasgow Warriors (Scotland)	0–6	(Ireland) Leinster
	Report	Pen: Madigan (2/3) 5', 50'

Scotstoun
Attendance: 3,970
Referee: Neil Hennessy (WRU)

25 November 2012
15:00

(1 BP) Zebre (Italy)	7–14	(Wales) Cardiff Blues
Try: Pace 18' c Con: Halangahu (1/1)	Report	Try: Trevett 27' m Pen: Sweeney (3/4) 56', 68', 70'

Stadio XXV Aprile
Attendance: 700
Referee: Leo Colgan (IRFU)

25 November 2012
17:15

(1 BP) Munster (Ireland)	6–13	(Wales) Scarlets
Pen: Keatley (1/1) 23'; Hanrahan (1/1) 80'	Report	Try: Fenby 70' c Con: Thomas (1/1); Pen: Thomas (2/6) 29', 68'

Musgrave Park
Attendance: 6,219
Referee: Laurent Cardona (FFR)

=== Round 10 ===
30 November 2012
19:05

Ospreys (Wales)	33–12	(Wales) Cardiff Blues
Try: King 12' c Fussell 42' c Allen 79' c Con: Morgan (3/3); Pen: Morgan (4/5) 10', 24', 37', 60'	Report	Pen: Sweeney (2/2) 26', 39'; Patchell (2/2) 47', 52'

Liberty Stadium
Attendance: 8,169
Referee: Leighton Hodges (WRU)

1 December 2012
15:00

(1 BP) Benetton Treviso (Italy)	32–13	(Wales) Newport Gwent Dragons
Try: Gori 9' c Loamanu (2) 25' m, 42' c McLean 39' m Botes 72' m Con: Di Bernardo (2/5); Pen: Di Bernardo (1/1) 12'	Report	Try: Prydie 52' c Con: Prydie (1/1); Pen: Prydie (2/2) 2', 15'

Stadio Comunale di Monigo
Attendance: 3,600
Referee: David Wilkinson (IRFU)

1 December 2012
17:00

(1 BP) Connacht (Ireland)	23–24	(Scotland) Edinburgh
Try: Harris-Wright 12' c Poolman 69' c Con: Parks (2/2); Pen: Parks (3/3) 17', 38', 58'	Report	Try: T. Visser 5' c Scott 35' c McInally 65' c Con: Laidlaw (3/3); Pen: Laidlaw (1/1) 13'

Sportsgrounds
Attendance: 4,930
Referee: Marius Mitrea (FIR)

1 December 2012
18:00

(1 BP) Leinster (Ireland)	37–7	(Italy) Zebre
Try: Conway 26' c J. Sexton 34' c McFadden (2) 59' c, 78' m Healy 69' m Con: J. Sexton (2/2); McFadden (1/3); Pen: J. Sexton (1/1) 25'; McFadden (1/1) 52'	Report	Try: Tebaldi 48' c Con: Halangahu (1/1)

Royal Dublin Society
Attendance: 15,894
Referee: Andrew McMenemy (SRU)

1 December 2012
19:45

(1 BP) Munster (Ireland)	31–3	(Scotland) Glasgow Warriors
Try: Stander (2) 8' c, 38' c O'Donnell 23' c penalty try 74' c Con: O'Gara (4/4); Pen: O'Gara (1/1) 37'	Report	Pen: Weir (1/1) 3'

Thomond Park
Attendance: 15,138
Referee: Ian Davies (WRU)

2 December 2012
16:00

(1 BP) Scarlets (Wales)	12–19	(Ireland) Ulster
Pen: Thomas (4/7) 20', 49', 52', 80'	Report	Try: Trimble 28' c Con: Jackson (1/1); Pen: Jackson (4/5) 9', 33', 43', 58'

Parc y Scarlets
Attendance: 7,089
Referee: Peter Fitzgibbon (IRFU)

=== Round 11 ===
21 December 2012
19:05

(1 BP) Cardiff Blues (Wales)	6–9	(Wales) Scarlets
Pen: Patchell (2/3) 16', 58'	Report	Pen: Thomas (3/6) 5', 10', 40'

Cardiff Arms Park
Attendance: 9,872
Referee: Ian Davies (WRU)

21 December 2012
19:05

Ulster (Ireland)	27–19	(Ireland) Leinster
Try: Penalty try 37' c Williams 44' c Trimble 75' c Con: Pienaar (3/3); Pen: Jackson (1/3) 26'; Pienaar (1/2) 30'	Report	Try: McFadden 78' c Con: Madigan (1/1); Pen: Madigan (4/5) 12', 19', 34', 43'

Ravenhill
Attendance: 10,940
Referee: George Clancy (IRFU)

22 December 2012
15:00

(1 BP) Zebre (Italy)	3–10	(Italy) Benetton Treviso
Pen: Orquera (1/1) 60'	Report	Try: Loamanu 43' c Con: Di Bernardo (1/1); Pen: Di Bernardo (1/5) 76'

Stadio XXV Aprile
Attendance: 3,000
Referee: Laurent Cardona (FFR)

22 December 2012
17:15

(1 BP) Connacht (Ireland)	12–16	(Ireland) Munster
Pen: Parks (3/4) 11', 24', 45'; Drop: Parks (1/1) 54'	Report	Try: penalty try 37' c Con: Keatley (1/1); Pen: Keatley (3/3) 17', 40', 42'

Sportsgrounds
Attendance: 7,789
Referee: Dudley Phillips (IRFU)

==== 1872 Cup 1st round ====
21 December 2012
19:35

Glasgow Warriors (Scotland)	23–14	(Scotland) Edinburgh
Try: Van der Merwe (2) 7' m, 25' c Harley 14' m Con: Horne (1/3); Pen: Weir (2/3) 67', 72'	Report	Try: Francis 50' m Pen: Laidlaw (3/3) 32', 45'

Scotstoun
Attendance: 6,000
Referee: Jérôme Garcès (FFR)

=== Welsh Round ===
26 December 2012
14:05

Cardiff Blues (Wales)	12–10	(Wales) Newport Gwent Dragons (1 BP)
Pen: Patchell (4/4) 15', 22', 30', 63'	Report	Try: Tuilagi 49' c Con: W. Evans (1/1); Pen: Robling (1/1) 61'

Cardiff Arms Park
Attendance: 10,243
Referee: Leighton Hodges (WRU)

26 December 2012
17:30

Ospreys (Wales)	32–3	(Wales) Scarlets
Try: penalty try 24' c King 48' m Fotuali'i 66' m Con: Biggar (1/3); Pen: Biggar (4/4) 2', 33', 40', 53'; Drop: Fotuali'i (1/1) 11'	Report	Pen: Thomas (1/2) 27'

Liberty Stadium
Attendance: 19,443
Referee: Nigel Owens (WRU)

=== Round 12 ===
29 December 2012
15:00

Benetton Treviso (Italy)	26–18	(Italy) Zebre
Try: Gori 26' c Ghiraldini 44' c Con: Burton (2/2); Pen: Burton (2/2) 22, 40'; Drop: Burton (2/2) 2', 8'	Report	Try: Buso 58' m Venditti 79' c Con: Tebaldi (1/1); Pen: Orquera (1/2) 15'; Garcia (1/1) 39'

Stadio Comunale di Monigo
Attendance: 5,000
Referee: Matteo Liperini (FIR)

29 December 2012
17:30

Munster (Ireland)	24–10	(Ireland) Ulster
Try: penalty try 33' c Zebo 45' c P. O'Mahony 50' c Con: Keatley (3/3); Pen: Keatley (1/1) 3'	Report	Try: Birch 80' c Con: Olding (1/1); Pen: O'Connor (1/2) 22'

Thomond Park
Attendance: 23,587
Referee: Alain Rolland (IRFU)

29 December 2012
19:45

Leinster (Ireland)	17–0	(Ireland) Connacht
Try: Madigan 33' c McGrath 73' c Con: Madigan (2/2); Pen: Madigan (1/1) 57'	Report

Royal Dublin Society
Attendance: 18,500
Referee: John Lacey (IRFU)

31 December 2012
16:15

Newport Gwent Dragons (Wales)	3–14	(Wales) Ospreys
Pen: Prydie (1/2) 13'	Report	Try: Walker 3' c Beck 62' c Con: Biggar (2/2)

Rodney Parade
Attendance: 7,018
Referee: Nigel Owens (WRU)

==== 1872 Cup 2nd round ====
29 December 2012
16:05

(1 BP) Edinburgh (Scotland)	17–21	(Scotland) Glasgow Warriors
Try: Grant 59' c T. Visser 76' c Con: Laidlaw (2/2); Pen: Laidlaw (1/2) 9'	Report	Try: Maitland 7' m Jackson 29' m Pyrgos 55' m Pen: Horne (2/2) 37', 40'

Murrayfield
Attendance: 11,225
Referee: Neil Paterson (SRU)

=== Round 13 ===
4 January 2013
19:05

Ospreys (Wales)	16–15	(Italy) Zebre (1 BP)
Try: Biggar 69' c Con: Biggar (1/1); Pen: Biggar (3/4) 22', 34', 66'	Report	Try: Chillon 28' m Tebaldi 72' c Con: Halangahu (1/1); Pen: Chillon (1/1) 12'

Liberty Stadium
Attendance: 7,891
Referee: Neil Paterson (SRU)

4 January 2013
19:05

(1 BP) Ulster (Ireland)	47–17	(Wales) Scarlets
Try: Diack 44' c Williams 56' c Trimble 73' c penalty try 76' c McComb 77' c Con: Pienaar (2/2); Jackson (3/3); Pen: Pienaar (4/4) 23', 34', 38', 48'	Report	Try: Turnbull 67' c S. Williams 80' c Con: Thomas (1/1); S. Williams (1/1); Pen: Thomas (1/2) 9'

Ravenhill
Attendance: 10,977
Referee: Leighton Hodges (WRU)

4 January 2013
19:30

(1 BP) Glasgow Warriors (Scotland)	41–7	(Italy) Benetton Treviso
Try: Van der Merwe 25' c Hogg (2) 28' c, 77' c Seymour 39' c Matawalu 74' c Con: Jackson (3/3); Weir (2/2); Pen: Jackson (2/2) 4', 20'	Report	Try: Minto 52' c Con: Burton (1/1)

Scotstoun
Attendance: 3,605
Referee: Leo Colgan (IRFU)

4 January 2013
19:35

Edinburgh (Scotland)	16–31	(Ireland) Leinster (1 BP)
Try: Nel 75' c Con: Francis (1/1); Pen: Laidlaw (2/2) 18', 40'; Drop: Francis (1/1) 49'	Report	Try: penalty try 34' c D'Arcy 38' c J. Sexton 57' c Madigan 67' c Con: J. Sexton (4/4); Pen: J. Sexton (1/2) 20'

Murrayfield
Attendance: 3,821
Referee: Ian Davies (WRU)

5 January 2013
17:00

Connacht (Ireland)	30–11	(Wales) Newport Gwent Dragons
Try: penalty try 20' c Naoupu 27' c Poolman 44' c Con: Parks (3/3); Pen: Parks (2/2) 3', 8'; Drop: Parks (1/1) 59'	Report	Try: J. Evans 80' m Pen: Prydie (2/2) 38', 43'

Sportsgrounds
Attendance: 4,958
Referee: Andrew McMenemy (SRU)

5 January 2013
19:30

Munster (Ireland)	6–17	(Wales) Cardiff Blues
Pen: O'Gara (2/2) 22', 46'	Report	Try: O. Williams 43' c Copeland 70' c Con: Patchell (2/2); Pen: Patchell (1/1) 11'

Musgrave Park
Attendance: 8,874
Referee: Nigel Owens (WRU)

=== Round 14 ===
8 February 2013
19:05

(1 BP) Ulster (Ireland)	12–16	(Wales) Ospreys
Pen: Pienaar (3/3) 5', 15', 33'; Olding (1/1) 65'	Report	Try: Bevington 67' c Con: Morgan (1/1); Pen: Morgan (3/3) 10', 22', 54'

Ravenhill
Attendance: 10,886
Referee: Marius Mitrea (FIR)

8 February 2013
19:30

Cardiff Blues (Wales)	11–26	(Ireland) Leinster
Try: Tovey 51' m Pen: Patchell (2/4) 13', 59'	Report	Try: Boss 37' c Murphy 40' c Con: Madigan (2/2); Pen: Madigan (4/4) 4', 28', 32', 70'

Cardiff Arms Park
Attendance: 5,783
Referee: Peter Fitzgibbon (IRFU)

8 February 2013
19:30

Newport Gwent Dragons (Wales)	23–14	(Italy) Benetton Treviso
Try: S. Jones 55' c Prydie 68' c Con: Prydie (2/2); Pen: S. Jones (1/6) 30'; Prydie (2/2) 40', 72'	Report	Try: la Grange 6' c Giusti 25' c Con: Di Bernardo (2/2)

Rodney Parade
Attendance: 4,212
Referee: David Wilkinson (IRFU)

8 February 2013
19:30

Scarlets (Wales)	25–15	(Ireland) Connacht
Try: Snyman 53' c Con: O. Williams (1/1); Pen: O. Williams (6/6) 5', 20', 36', 40', 63', 72'	Report	Try: Poolman 1' m Swift 76' c Con: Nikora (1/1); Drop: Parks (1/1) 30'

Parc y Scarlets
Attendance: 5,886
Referee: Matteo Liperini (FIR)

9 February 2013
19:45

Munster (Ireland)	30–3	(Scotland) Edinburgh
Try: Stander 68' c Sherry 75' m Con: Keatley (1/2); Pen: Keatley (6/7) 22', 28', 50', 54', 57', 64'	Report	Pen: Francis (1/2) 14'

Musgrave Park
Attendance: 7,241
Referee: Ian Davies (WRU)

10 February 2013
15:05

Zebre (Italy)	20–36	(Scotland) Glasgow Warriors (1 BP)
Try: van Schalkwyk 4' c Tebaldi 9' c Con: Halangahu (2/2); Pen: Halangahu (2/4) 25', 36'	Report	Try: McGuigan (2) 7' c, 56' m Dunbar 11' c Eddie 61' c Murchie 75' c Con: Wight (2/2); Russell (2/3); Pen: Wight (1/1) 15'

Stadio XXV Aprile
Attendance: 1,000
Referee: Andrew McMenemy (SRU)

=== Round 15 ===
15 February 2013
19:05

Newport Gwent Dragons (Wales)	3–60	(Scotland) Glasgow Warriors (1 BP)
Pen: Prydie (1/2) 2'	Report	Try: Bennett 16' c Matawalu 20' c Dunbar 37' c Paris 60' c Swinson (2) 65' c, 75' m Strauss 68' c Thomson 80' c Con: Weir (5/5); Wight (2/3); Pen: Weir (2/2) 4', 27'

Rodney Parade
Attendance: 4,311
Referee: Claudio Blessano (FIR)

15 February 2013
19:05

(1 BP) Ulster (Ireland)	26–3	(Italy) Zebre
Try: Herring 8' c Diack (2) 40' m, 57' c Andrew 73' c Con: Pienaar (3/4)	Report	Pen: Halangahu (1/2) 34'

Ravenhill
Attendance: 10,309
Referee: Neil Paterson (SRU)

15 February 2013
19:30

(1 BP) Edinburgh (Scotland)	16–17	(Wales) Cardiff Blues
Try: Nel 50' c Con: Hunter (1/1); Pen: Hunter (2/5) 26', 35'; Leonard (1/1) 58'	Report	Try: Paterson 38' m Pen: Patchell (4/4) 5', 13', 28', 66'

Murrayfield
Attendance: 3,583
Referee: John Lacey (IRFU)

15 February 2013
19:45

Connacht (Ireland)	22–10	(Wales) Ospreys
Try: Faloon 17' c Con: Parks (1/1); Pen: Parks (4/5) 7', 32', 47', 75'; Drop: Parks (1/1) 78'	Report	Try: Fotuali'i 13' c Con: Morgan (1/1); Pen: Morgan (1/1) 69'

Sportsgrounds
Attendance: 4,680
Referee: Giuseppe Vivarini (FIR)

16 February 2013
17:00

(1 BP) Leinster (Ireland)	40–5	(Italy) Benetton Treviso
Try: Ryan (3) 10' m, 23' c, 46' c Cronin (2) 13' c, 27' c Auva'a 69' c Con: Madigan (4/5); McFadden (1/1)	Report	Try: Nitoglia 49' m

Royal Dublin Society
Attendance: 16,208
Referee: Leighton Hodges (WRU)

16 February 2013
18:30

Scarlets (Wales)	18–10	(Ireland) Munster
Pen: O. Williams (5/7) 13', 19', 39', 50', 57'; Drop: O. Williams (1/1) 63'	Report	Try: Hurley 80' c Con: O'Gara (1/1); Pen: O'Gara (1/4) 29'

Parc y Scarlets
Attendance: 7,124
Referee: Dudley Phillips (IRFU)

=== Round 16 ===
22 February 2013
19:30

(1 BP) Cardiff Blues (Wales)	22–26	(Ireland) Connacht
Try: Robinson 21' m Copeland 61' m Pen: Patchell (4/6) 7', 47', 51', 67'	Report	Try: Poolman 2' m Faloon (2) 5' c, 64' m Con: Nikora (1/3); Pen: Nikora (3/3) 31', 56', 73'

Cardiff Arms Park
Attendance: 5,236
Referee: Dudley Phillips (IRFU)

22 February 2013
19:35

(1 BP) Glasgow Warriors (Scotland)	20–14	(Ireland) Ulster (1 BP)
Try: Swinson 15' m Seymour 28' m Murchie 41' m Matawalu 73' m	Report	Try: Olding 67' m Pen: Pienaar (3/5) 6', 18', 49'

Scotstoun
Attendance: 5,613
Referee: Nigel Owens (WRU)

22 February 2013
20:00

Ospreys (Wales)	24–7	(Scotland) Edinburgh
Try: Allen (2) 4' c, 23' c Webb 57' c Con: Morgan (3/3); Pen: Morgan (1/3) 55'	Report	Try: Watson 40' c Con: Leonard (1/1)

Liberty Stadium
Attendance: 5,580
Referee: David Wilkinson (IRFU)

23 February 2013
19:45

(1 BP) Leinster (Ireland)	32–5	(Wales) Scarlets
Try: Goodman 33' m Dundon 48' c Murphy 70' c Cooney 80' c Con: Madigan (3/3); Pen: Goodman (2/4) 3', 31'	Report	Try: Fenby 35' m

Royal Dublin Society
Attendance: 15,627
Referee: Marius Mitrea (FIR)

24 February 2013
15:00

(1 BP) Benetton Treviso (Italy)	34–10	(Ireland) Munster
Try: Nitoglia 3' c Giusti 19' m la Grange 34' c Semenzato 61' m Toniolatti 78' c Con: Di Bernardo (3/5); Pen: Di Bernardo (1/2) 40'	Report	Try: penalty try 49' c Con: Keatley (1/1); Pen: Keatley (1/2) 24'

Stadio Comunale di Monigo
Attendance: 2,200
Referee: Neil Paterson (SRU)

24 February 2013
15:05

(1 BP) Zebre (Italy)	13–14	(Wales) Newport Gwent Dragons
Try: Pratichetti 39' c Con: Chillon (1/1); Pen: Chillon (2/4) 21', 44'	Report	Try: Groves 61' m Pen: S. Jones (3/6) 32', 56', 66'

Stadio XXV Aprile
Attendance: 400
Referee: Leo Colgan (IRFU)

=== Round 17 ===
1 March 2013
19:00

(1 BP) Newport Gwent Dragons (Wales)	19–26	(Ireland) Leinster (1 BP)
Try: I. Jones 41' m S. Jones 79' m Pen: S. Jones (2/2) 3', 30'; Drop: S. Jones (1/1) 35'	Report	Try: Cronin (2) 2' c, 8' m D. Kearney (2) 17' c, 65' c Con: Madigan (3/4)

Rodney Parade
Attendance: 4,258
Referee: David Wilkinson (IRFU)

1 March 2013
19:05

Scarlets (Wales)	14–13	(Scotland) Edinburgh (1 BP)
Try: Fenby 14' m Pen: Thomas (2/2) 3', 52'; O. Williams (1/4) 67'	Report	Try: Fife 22' c Con: Leonard (1/1); Pen: Leonard (2/3) 19', 44'

Parc y Scarlets
Attendance: 6,314
Referee: Giuseppe Vivarini (FIR)

1 March 2013
19:05

Ulster (Ireland)	29–29	(Italy) Benetton Treviso (1 BP)
Try: Trimble 19' c Olding 33' c Con: Jackson (2/2); Pen: Jackson (5/7) 28', 47', 56', 70', 78'	Report	Try: Budd (3) 40' c, 64' c, 79' m Barbieri 51' c Con: Di Bernardo (3/4); Pen: Di Bernardo (1/1) 4'

Ravenhill
Attendance: 10,678
Referee: Andrew McMenemy (SRU)

1 March 2013
19:35

(1 BP) Glasgow Warriors (Scotland)	29–13	(Wales) Cardiff Blues
Try: Horne 15' c Matawalu (2) 56' c, 64' m Weir 60' c Con: Weir (3/3); Pen: Weir (1/2) 36'	Report	Try: Navidi 25' c Con: Patchell (1/1); Pen: Patchell (2/2) 34', 39'

Scotstoun
Attendance: 3,807
Referee: George Clancy (IRFU)

1 March 2013
19:45

Connacht (Ireland)	23–19	(Italy) Zebre (1 BP)
Try: McKeon 2' c Duffy 21' c Con: Parks (2/2); Pen: Parks (2/2) 47', 80'; Drop: Parks (1/1) 75'	Report	Try: Sarto 31' c Con: Buso (1/1); Pen: Buso (3/5) 17', 29', 60'; Garcia (1/1) 71'

Sportsgrounds
Attendance: 4,856
Referee: Neil Hennessy (WRU)

2 March 2013
18:30

Munster (Ireland)	13–13	(Wales) Ospreys
Try: Varley 44' c Con: O'Gara (1/1); Pen: O'Gara (2/2) 4', 38'	Report	Try: J. Thomas 52' c Con: Morgan (1/1); Pen: Morgan (2/2) 16', 25'

Thomond Park
Attendance: 17,748
Referee: Nigel Owens (WRU)

=== Round 18 ===
22 March 2013
19:00

Zebre (Italy)	10–24	(Wales) Scarlets
Try: van Schalkwyk 13' m Venditti 57' m	Report	Try: L. Williams 40' m Snyman 47' c Con: O. Williams (1/2); Pen: O. Williams (4/4) 19', 33', 45', 53'

Stadio XXV Aprile
Attendance: 1,100
Referee: Peter Fitzgibbon (IRFU)

22 March 2013
19:05

(1 BP) Ospreys (Wales)	52–19	(Wales) Newport Gwent Dragons
Try: Fotuali'i 4' c Habberfield 7' c Beck 21' c Isaacs 42' c Biggar 64' c Arhip 73' c Tipuric 76' c Con: Biggar (5/5); Morgan (2/2); Pen: Biggar (1/1) 31'	Report	Try: D. Evans 47' m Faletau 69' m Pen: S. Jones (3/5) 13', 35', 55'

Liberty Stadium
Attendance: 9,935
Referee: John Lacey (IRFU)

22 March 2013
19:30

Edinburgh (Scotland)	14–8	(Ireland) Ulster (1 BP)
Try: McInally 56' m Pen: Francis (3/3) 16', 31', 74'	Report	Try: Trimble 65' m Pen: Jackson (1/4) 40'

Murrayfield
Attendance: 4,714
Referee: Leighton Hodges (WRU)

23 March 2013
17:45

Munster (Ireland)	22–0	(Ireland) Connacht
Try: O'Connell 11' c Varley (2) 14' m, 50' c Con: O'Gara (2/3); Pen: O'Gara (1/1) 40'	Report

Musgrave Park
Attendance: 8,203
Referee: Alain Rolland (IRFU)

23 March 2013
19:30

Benetton Treviso (Italy)	26–17	(Wales) Cardiff Blues
Try: Zanni 13' c penalty try 58' c Con: Di Bernardo (2/2); Pen: Di Bernardo (4/6) 35', 39', 68', 77'	Report	Try: Hewitt 29' c Reed 49' c Con: Sweeney (2/2); Pen: Sweeney (1/1) 12'

Stadio Comunale di Monigo
Attendance: 2,600
Referee: Giuseppe Vivarini (FIR)

23 March 2013
19:45

Leinster (Ireland)	22–17	(Scotland) Glasgow Warriors (1 BP)
Try: Madigan 72' c Con: Madigan (1/1); Pen: Madigan (5/5) 13', 24', 36', 40', 77'	Report	Try: Kalman 10' c Horne 32' c Con: Weir (2/2); Pen: Weir (1/1) 19'

Royal Dublin Society
Attendance: 16,156
Referee: Nigel Owens (WRU)

=== Round 19 ===
29 March 2013
19:00

(1 BP) Zebre (Italy)	7–9	(Scotland) Edinburgh
Try: van Schalkwyk 30' c Con: Orquera (1/1)	Report	Pen: Laidlaw (3/5) 5', 40', 45'

Stadio XXV Aprile
Attendance: 1,800
Referee: Sean Gallagher (IRFU)

29 March 2013
20:05

(1 BP) Glasgow Warriors (Scotland)	51–24	(Ireland) Munster
Try: Maitland 1' c Matawalu 28' c Jackson 57' c Bennett 70' c Hogg 74' c Barclay 80' c Con: Jackson (4/4); Weir (2/2); Pen: Jackson (3/3) 34', 38', 65'	Report	Try: Laulala 10' c Kilcoyne 26' c Howlett 77' c Con: O'Gara (2/2); Keatley (1/1); Pen: O'Gara (1/1) 49'

Scotstoun
Attendance: 5,692
Referee: Leighton Hodges (WRU)

30 March 2013
18:15

(1 BP) Leinster (Ireland)	18–22	(Ireland) Ulster
Pen: Madigan (6/6) 15', 19', 26', 40', 48', 69'	Report	Try: Diack 22' m Henderson 62' m Pen: Pienaar (4/4) 39', 51', 57', 71'

Royal Dublin Society
Attendance: 18,500
Referee: George Clancy (IRFU)

30 March 2013
20:00

Benetton Treviso (Italy)	P–P	(Ireland) Connacht
	Postponed due to a waterlogged pitch.

Stadio Comunale di Monigo
Referee: Neil Paterson (SRU)

==== Judgement Day ====
30 March 2013
14:30

Newport Gwent Dragons (Wales)	20–28	(Wales) Scarlets
Try: J. Evans 36' c D. Evans 75' c Con: Prydie (2/2); Pen: Prydie (2/2) 40', 56'	Report	Try: North (2) 26' c, 68' m J. Davies 66' c Con: O. Williams (2/3); Pen: O. Williams (3/6) 19', 45', 58'

Millennium Stadium
Attendance: 36,174
Referee: Peter Fitzgibbon (IRFU)

30 March 2013
17:15

(1 BP) Cardiff Blues (Wales)	16–23	(Wales) Ospreys
Try: Halfpenny 6' c Con: Halfpenny (1/1); Pen: Halfpenny (3/3) 25', 53', 63'	Report	Try: King 20' c Spratt 33' c Con: Biggar (2/2); Pen: Biggar (3/5) 11', 31', 76'

Millennium Stadium
Attendance: 36,174
Referee: Nigel Owens (WRU)

=== Round 20 ===
12 April 2013
19:05

Scarlets (Wales)	29–6	(Scotland) Glasgow Warriors
Try: Owens 18' c L. Williams 46' c Con: O. Williams (2/2); Pen: O. Williams (4/5) 4', 14', 51', 60'; Drop: O. Williams (1/1) 24'	Report	Pen: Jackson (2/2) 21', 27'

Parc y Scarlets
Attendance: 6,901
Referee: George Clancy (IRFU)

12 April 2013
19:05

(1 BP) Ulster (Ireland)	31–5	(Wales) Newport Gwent Dragons
Try: Bowe 24' c Olding 35' c Cave 38' c P. Marshall 45' c Con: Pienaar (4/4); Pen: Pienaar (1/1) 29'	Report	Try: Prydie 70' m

Ravenhill
Attendance: 9,647
Referee: Leighton Hodges (WRU)

12 April 2013
19:30

Edinburgh (Scotland)	24–32	(Ireland) Connacht
Pen: Laidlaw (8/9) 6', 16', 26', 29', 36', 54', 60', 69'	Report	Try: Kearney 32' c Henshaw 76' c Con: Parks (2/2); Pen: Parks (4/5) 4', 47', 52', 80'; Duffy (1/1) 40'; Drop: Parks (1/1) 62'

Murrayfield
Attendance: 4,171
Referee: Rhys Thomas (WRU)

13 April 2013
14:30

Cardiff Blues (Wales)	28–13	(Italy) Zebre
Try: Patchell 18' c Evans 36' m Roberts 73' c Con: Halfpenny (2/3); Pen: Halfpenny (3/3) 11', 23', 33'	Report	Try: Cristiano 79' c Con: Chiesa (1/1); Pen: Halangahu (2/3) 3', 28'

Cardiff Arms Park
Attendance: 9,769
Referee: Lloyd Linton (SRU)

13 April 2013
18:30

(1 BP) Munster (Ireland)	16–22	(Ireland) Leinster
Try: Keatley 21' m Jones 27' m Pen: Keatley (2/2) 43', 45'	Report	Try: O'Driscoll 71' c Con: Madigan (1/1); Pen: Madigan (5/5) 6', 15', 20', 34', 50'

Thomond Park
Attendance: 23,037
Referee: Nigel Owens (WRU)

13 April 2013
18:30

Ospreys (Wales)	28–3	(Italy) Benetton Treviso
Try: John 39' m Biggar 50' c Webb 80' c Con: Biggar (2/3); Pen: Biggar (3/4) 21', 25', 32'	Report	Pen: Botes (1/2) 7'

Liberty Stadium
Attendance: 9,138
Referee: Dudley Phillips (IRFU)

=== Round 21 ===
19 April 2013
19:00

Newport Gwent Dragons (Wales)	30–24	(Ireland) Munster (2 BP)
Try: S. Jones 19' c Wardle 75' m Con: Prydie (1/2); Pen: Prydie (5/5) 12', 16', 28', 48', 79'; Drop: S. Jones (1/1) 40'	Report	Try: Butler 13' m O'Mahony 58' m Stander 65' c Murphy 72' c Con: Keatley (2/4)

Rodney Parade
Attendance: 7,523
Referee: Claudio Blessano (FIR)

19 April 2013
19:35

(1 BP) Glasgow Warriors (Scotland)	35–17	(Wales) Ospreys
Try: Grant (2) 11' c, 30' c Maitland 17' m Matawalu 56' m Van der Merwe 80' m Con: Weir (2/4); Pen: Weir (1/4) 40'; Horne (1/2) 70'	Report	Try: Griffiths 47' c Lewis 61' c Con: Biggar (2/2); Pen: Biggar (1/1) 8'

Scotstoun
Attendance: 6,642
Referee: Peter Allan (SRU)

19 April 2013
19:45

Connacht (Ireland)	18–34	(Ireland) Ulster (1 BP)
Try: Naoupu 3' m Vainikolo 17' c Con: Parks (1/2); Pen: Parks (1/1) 24'; Nikora (1/1) 49'	Report	Try: Olding 9' c Trimble 11' m Best 32' c Bowe 71' c Payne 74' m Con: Pienaar (3/5); Pen: Pienaar (1/3) 29'

Sportsgrounds
Attendance: 6,463
Referee: Peter Fitzgibbon (IRFU)

19 April 2013
20:30

Benetton Treviso (Italy)	30–10	(Scotland) Edinburgh
Try: Vosawai 40' c Rizzo 60' c Favaro 80' c Con: Di Bernardo (3/3); Pen: Di Bernardo (3/6) 26', 34', 57'	Report	Try: Scott 13' c Con: Laidlaw (1/1); Pen: Laidlaw (1/1) 3'

Stadio Comunale di Monigo
Attendance: 3,200
Referee: Mark Patton (IRFU)

20 April 2013
18:30

Scarlets (Wales)	24–6	(Wales) Cardiff Blues
Try: J. Davies (2) 25' c, 58' c L. Williams 66' c Con: O. Williams (2/2); Priestland (1/1); Pen: O. Williams (1/3) 40'	Report	Pen: Halfpenny (2/2) 18', 35'

Parc y Scarlets
Attendance: 10,427
Referee: Nigel Owens (WRU)

21 April 2013
16:00

Zebre (Italy)	22–41	(Ireland) Leinster (1 BP)
Try: Sinoti 25' c Halangahu 40' c Festuccia 73' m Con: Halangahu (2/2); Pen: Halangahu (1/1) 6'	Report	Try: Denton 10' c McFadden 15' c Carr 46' c Ryan 59' c Nacewa 61' c Con: J. Sexton (5/5); Pen: J. Sexton (2/2) 3', 44'

Stadio Città del Tricolore
Attendance: 4,700
Referee: Neil Paterson (SRU)

=== Round 19 rescheduled match ===
26 April 2013
20:30

Benetton Treviso (Italy)	23–23	(Ireland) Connacht
Try: Gori 48' c penalty try 72' c Con: Di Bernardo (2/2); Pen: Di Bernardo (3/3) 4', 43', 60'	Report	Try: Vainikolo 18' c O'Donohoe 80' c Con: Parks (2/2); Pen: Parks (3/5) 35', 51', 62'

Stadio Comunale di Monigo
Attendance: 4,850
Referee: Neil Paterson (SRU)

This match – originally scheduled to be held during Round 19, on 30 March 2013 – was postponed due to a waterlogged pitch.

=== Round 22 ===
3 May 2013
19:45

Connacht (Ireland)	3–20	(Scotland) Glasgow Warriors
Pen: Parks (1/2) 39'	Report	Try: Van der Merwe 16' c Maitland 70' c Con: Jackson (1/1); Hogg (1/1); Pen: Hogg (1/1) 66'; Drop: Jackson (1/1) 12'

Sportsgrounds
Attendance: 6,081
Referee: George Clancy (IRFU)

3 May 2013
19:45

Edinburgh (Scotland)	31–24	(Wales) Newport Gwent Dragons (1 BP)
Try: Tonks 14' c Laidlaw 19' m Talei 25' c Con: Laidlaw (2/3); Pen: Laidlaw (4/5) 35', 40', 51', 54'	Report	Try: S. Jones 4' c Lydiate 63' c Prydie 65' c Con: Prydie (3/3); Pen: Prydie (1/2) 39'

Murrayfield
Attendance: 3,660
Referee: Marius Mitrea (FIR)

3 May 2013
19:45

(1 BP) Leinster (Ireland)	37–19	(Wales) Ospreys
Try: Conway (3) 7' c, 23' c, 42' c Healy 79' c Con: J. Sexton (3/3); Madigan (1/1); Pen: J. Sexton (3/3) 40', 56', 76'	Report	Try: Biggar 31' c John 37' m Isaacs 72' c Con: Biggar (2/3)

Royal Dublin Society
Attendance: 17,583
Referee: Nigel Owens (WRU)

3 May 2013
19:45

Scarlets (Wales)	17–41	(Italy) Benetton Treviso (1 BP)
Try: L. Williams 80' m Pen: O. Williams (4/5) 3', 13', 18', 32'	Report	Try: Barbieri 8' c Vosawai 49' c Morisi 65' m Loamanu 73' c Con: Burton (3/4); Pen: Burton (5/5) 16', 35', 42', 48', 75'

Parc y Scarlets
Attendance: 9,129
Referee: Dudley Phillips (IRFU)

3 May 2013
19:45

(1 BP) Ulster (Ireland)	37–13	(Wales) Cardiff Blues
Try: Pienaar 9' c Trimble (2) 43' c, 54' c Diack 78' c Con: Pienaar (4/4); Pen: Pienaar (3/4) 26', 46', 50'	Report	Try: Hewitt 4' c Con: Patchell (1/1); Pen: Patchell (1/2) 21'; Drop: Patchell (1/1) 28'

Ravenhill
Attendance: 10,700
Referee: Neil Paterson (SRU)

3 May 2013
19:45

(1 BP) Zebre (Italy)	25–27	(Ireland) Munster
Try: Sinoti 13' m Venditti 36' m Pen: Halangahu (3/4) 2', 24', 59'; Garcia (2/3) 28', 40'	Report	Try: Murphy 5' c Butler 17' c Botha 65' c Con: Keatley (3/3); Pen: Keatley (2/4) 42', 58'

Stadio XXV Aprile
Attendance: 2,500
Referee: Andrew McMenemy (SRU)

== Play-offs ==
=== Semi-finals ===
The semi-finals were played on the weekend of 10/11 May 2013; these followed a 1 v 4, 2 v 3 system with the games being played at the home ground of the higher placed teams.

10 May 2013
19:45

Ulster (Ireland)	28–17	(Wales) Scarlets
Try: Bowe 25' c Diack 34' m Court 43' c Con: Pienaar (2/3); Pen: Pienaar (3/4) 7', 40', 63'	Report	Try: G. Davies 61' c Timani 79' c Con: O. Williams (2/2); Pen: O. Williams (1/2) 5'

Ravenhill
Attendance: 10,700
Referee: Alain Rolland (IRFU)

11 May 2013
19:35

Leinster (Ireland)	17–15	(Scotland) Glasgow Warriors
Try: Heaslip 27' m Pen: J. Sexton (4/6) 12', 32', 63', 70'	Report	Try: Matawalu 15' c Bennett 75' m Con: Hogg (1/2); Pen: Hogg (1/1) 25'

Royal Dublin Society
Attendance: 13,235
Referee: Pascal Gaüzère (FFR)

=== Final ===
The final was contested on Saturday, 25 May 2013, between the winners of the two semi-finals.

25 May 2013
16:45

Ulster (Ireland)	18–24	(Ireland) Leinster
Pen: Pienaar (6/6) 24', 36', 47', 51', 56', 69'	Report	Try: Jennings 3' c Heaslip 63' m Con: J. Sexton (1/2); Pen: J. Sexton (4/5) 8', 34', 40', 45'

Royal Dublin Society
Attendance: 19,200
Referee: John Lacey (Ireland)

FB	15	(New Zealand) Jared Payne
RW	14	(Ireland) Andrew Trimble
OC	13	(Ireland) Darren Cave
IC	12	(Ireland) Stuart Olding		(substituted off) 64'
LW	11	(Ireland) Tommy Bowe
FH	10	(Ireland) Paddy Jackson
SH	9	(South Africa) Ruan Pienaar
N8	8	(New Zealand) Nick Williams
OF	7	(Ireland) Chris Henry
BF	6	(South Africa) Robbie Diack	(yellow card) 44' to 54'	(substituted off) 64'
RL	5	(Ireland) Dan Tuohy
LL	4	(South Africa) Johann Muller (c)
TP	3	(New Zealand) John Afoa
HK	2	(Ireland) Rory Best
LP	1	(Ireland) Tom Court		(substituted off) 73'
Replacements:
HK	16	(Ireland) Rob Herring
PR	17	(Ireland) Callum Black		(substituted on) 73'
PR	18	(Ireland) Declan Fitzpatrick
LK	19	(Ireland) Iain Henderson		(substituted on) 64'
FL	20	(Ireland) Mike McComish
SH	21	(Ireland) Paul Marshall
CE	22	(Ireland) Mike Allen		(substituted on) 64'
FB	23	(Ireland) Peter Nelson
Coach:
(New Zealand) Mark Anscombe

FB	15	(Fiji) Isa Nacewa	(yellow card) 47' to 57'
RW	14	(Ireland) Fergus McFadden
OC	13	(Ireland) Brian O'Driscoll
IC	12	(Ireland) Ian Madigan
LW	11	(Ireland) Andrew Conway
FH	10	(Ireland) Johnny Sexton
SH	9	(Ireland) Isaac Boss
N8	8	(Ireland) Jamie Heaslip
OF	7	(Ireland) Shane Jennings
BF	6	(Ireland) Kevin McLaughlin
RL	5	(Ireland) Devin Toner		(substituted off) 73'
LL	4	(Ireland) Leo Cullen (c)
TP	3	(Ireland) Mike Ross		(substituted off) 75'
HK	2	(Ireland) Richardt Strauss		(substituted off) 29'	(substituted on) 40'
LP	1	(Ireland) Cian Healy		(substituted off) 77'
Replacements:
HK	16	(Ireland) Seán Cronin		(substituted on) 29'	(substituted off) 40'
PR	17	(Ireland) Jack McGrath		(substituted on) 77'
PR	18	(Ireland) Jamie Hagan		(substituted on) 75'
LK	19	(South Africa) Quinn Roux		(substituted on) 73'
FL	20	(Ireland) Rhys Ruddock
SH	21	(Ireland) John Cooney
CE	22	(New Zealand) Andrew Goodman
WG	23	(Ireland) David Kearney
Coach:
(New Zealand) Josef Schmidt

Man of the Match:
(Ireland) Shane Jennings (Leinster)

Touch judges:
George Clancy (Ireland)
Peter Fitzgibbon (Ireland)
Television match official:
Dermot Moloney (Ireland)

== Leading scorers ==
Note: Flags to the left of player names indicate national team as has been defined under IRB eligibility rules, or primary nationality for players who have not yet earned international senior caps. Players may hold one or more non-IRB nationalities.

=== Top points scorers ===
Rank	Player	Club	Points
1	(Ireland) Ian Madigan	(Ireland) Leinster	186
2	(South Africa) Ruan Pienaar	(Ireland) Ulster	172
3	(Wales) Tom Prydie	(Wales) Newport Gwent Dragons	170
4	(Wales) Dan Biggar	(Wales) Ospreys	168
5	(Ireland) Ian Keatley	(Ireland) Munster	142

=== Top try scorers ===
Rank	Player	Club	Tries
1	(Scotland) Tim Visser	(Scotland) Edinburgh	11
2	(Canada) D. T. H. van der Merwe	(Scotland) Glasgow Warriors	10
2	(Ireland) Andrew Trimble	(Ireland) Ulster	10
4	(Wales) George North	(Wales) Scarlets	9
5	(Italy) Robert Barbieri	(Italy) Benetton Treviso	8

== End-of-season awards ==
Award	Winner
Players' Player of the Season:	(New Zealand) Nick Williams (Ulster)
Young Player of the Season:	(Ireland) Luke Marshall (Ulster)
Coach of the Season:	(Scotland) Gregor Townsend (Glasgow)
Chairman's Award:	(England) Michael Swift (Connacht)
Golden Boot:	(Ireland) Ian Madigan (Leinster)
Collision Kings:	Scarlets
Fairplay Award:	Ulster
Straight Talking Award:	(Wales) Alun Wyn Jones (Ospreys)
Try of the Season:	(Ireland) Andrew Trimble (Ulster vs Connacht)

2012/2013 Dream Team

Pos		Player	Team
FB	15	(Scotland) Stuart Hogg	Glasgow
RW	14	(Wales) George North	Scarlets
OC	13	(Wales) Jonathan Davies	Scarlets
IC	12	(Ireland) Luke Marshall	Ulster
LW	11	(Scotland) Tim Visser	Edinburgh
FH	10	(Ireland) Ian Madigan	Leinster
SH	9	(Fiji) Nikola Matawalu	Glasgow
N8	8	(New Zealand) Nick Williams	Ulster
OF	7	(Wales) Justin Tipuric	Ospreys
BF	6	(Italy) Alessandro Zanni	Treviso
RL	5	(Scotland) Alastair Kellock	Glasgow
LL	4	(Wales) Alun Wyn Jones	Ospreys
TP	3	(Wales) Adam Jones	Ospreys
HK	2	(Italy) Leonardo Ghiraldini	Treviso
LP	1	(Scotland) Ryan Grant	Glasgow
