= George North =

Wales and British Lions international rugby union player (born 1992)

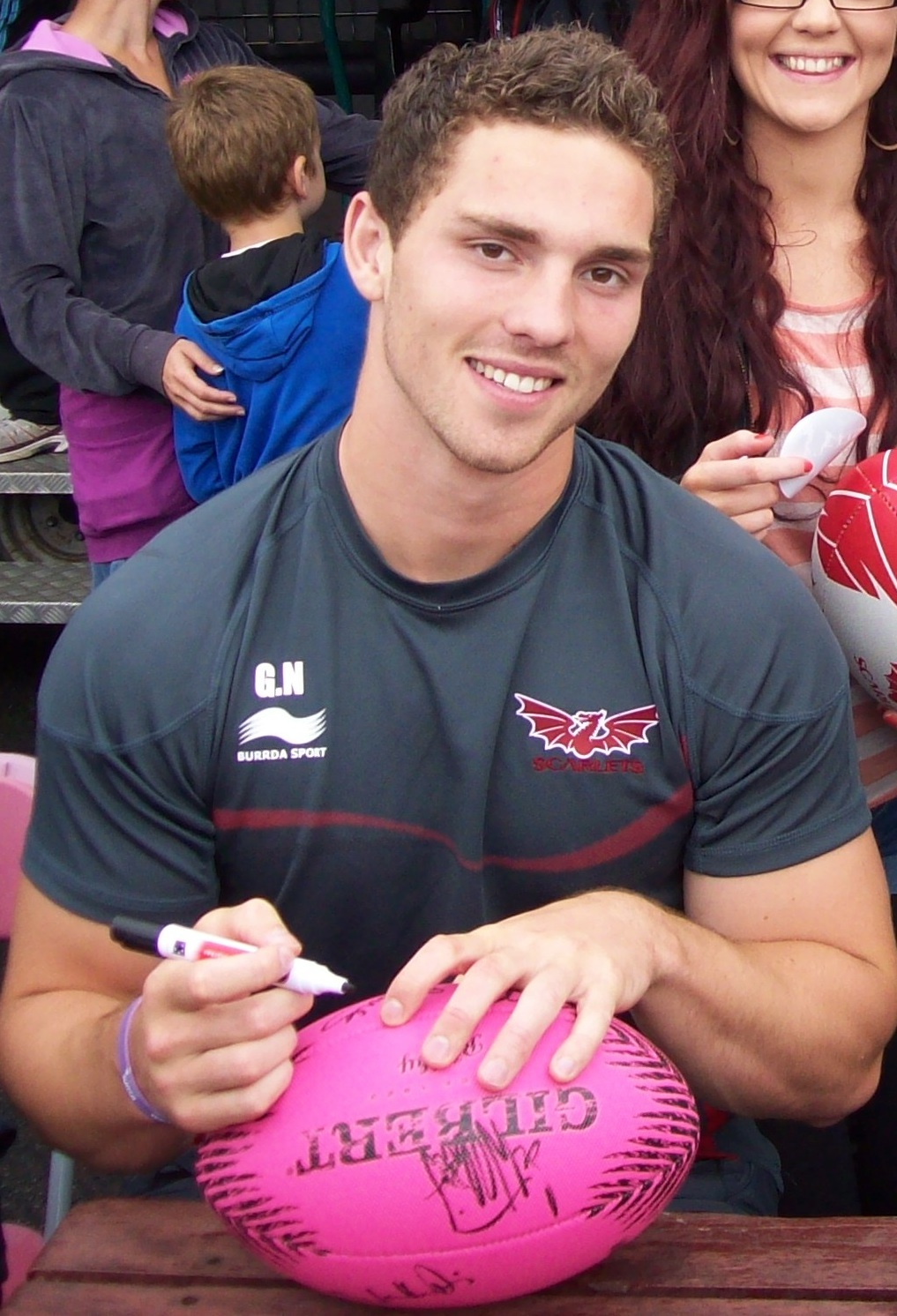
- North representing Scarlets during the Pro12
- Full name: George Philip North
- Born: 13 April 1992 (age 34) King's Lynn, England
- Height: 1.93 m (6 ft 4 in)
- Weight: 114 kg (251 lb; 17 st 13 lb)
- School: Llandovery College; Ysgol Uwchradd Bodedern
- University: Bangor University

Rugby union career
- Position(s): Centre, Wing
Senior career
Years	Team	Apps	(Points)
2010–2013	Scarlets	42	(70)
2013–2018	Northampton Saints	90	(190)
2018–2024	Ospreys	48	(70)
2024–2026	Provence	16	(10)
- Correct as of 24 May 2026
International career
Years	Team	Apps	(Points)
2010–2024	Wales	121	(235)
2013, 2017	British & Irish Lions	3	(10)
2026	Barbarians	1	(12)

George Philip North (born 13 April 1992) is a former professional rugby union player. Born in England, he grew up in Wales and represented Wales at international level between 2010 and 2024, as well as the British and Irish Lions on two tours, and is one of the most accomplished players of his generation.

He began his professional career with the Scarlets before moving to England to play with the Northampton Saints. He made Welsh rugby history by being the youngest player to score a try on debut at the age of 18. North also has established himself as one of the top try-scorers at test level, holding at one time the record for the most tries scored by an active international player.

== Early life ==
North was born in 1992 in King's Lynn, Norfolk, England. His father is English from Yorkshire and his mother is from Anglesey. The family moved to Anglesey when he was aged two and he is a fluent Welsh language speaker. North was educated at Ysgol Uwchradd Bodedern on Anglesey and later at Llandovery College.

North played as a junior for Llangefni, Pwllheli, Rhyl, Caernarfon and Gogledd Cymru under-16s.

== Club career ==
Before his international call-up, North had played six matches for the Scarlets first team, a record restricted by an injury.

On 9 April 2013 it was confirmed that North would sign for Northampton Saints in the English Premiership for a reported fee of over £200,000. This announcement followed the Welsh Rugby Union claiming that Scarlets had attempted to sell North to French clubs, which had been rejected.

He scored his first Northampton Saints try against Sale Sharks after some excellent work by Jamie Elliott to make the score 12–0 in a game that finished 33–14 to Northampton. He scored his first Heineken Cup try for Saints on 14 December against Leinster Rugby. He started as Northampton beat Saracens to win the Premiership final.

North scored his 150th point for Saints with a try against Exeter Chiefs in the English Premiership on 30 September 2016.

North was instrumental in Saints securing a European Rugby Champions Cup place for the 2017–18 season as the side beat both Connacht and Stade Français Paris in the European Champions Cup play-off games to claim the final spot in the competition for the following season.

On 22 November 2017, the Welsh Rugby Union announced that it had signed North to a National Dual Contract, with the WRU funding 60% and a Welsh region funding the remainder, that would take effect upon the expiry of North's contract with Northampton Saints at the end of the 2017–18 season. At the time of announcement, it had not yet been determined which of Wales' four Pro 14 sides North would join. On 25 April 2018, the WRU announced that North would join the Ospreys effective with the 2018–19 season.

During December 2023, North confirmed he would be leaving the Swansea Ospreys after the conclusion of the 2024 season, and would be playing rugby in the south of France for the Pro D2 team, Provence, after signing a two-year contract with the club. Unfortunately he ruptured his Achilles in his final match for Wales against Italy in the Six Nations, and he did not play competitive rugby until January 2025, when he won his debut for Provence in the second tier of French rugby. In April 2026, North announced that he would retire from professional rugby.

== International career ==
=== Wales ===
==== 2010–2013 ====
After an impressive start to the 2010 season, in October 2010, he was selected to the 33-man squad for the Autumn international series. On 11 November 2010, North was named in the Wales team to face South Africa on 13 November, making him the joint-third youngest player to represent Wales behind Tom Prydie and Norman Biggs and equal to Evan Williams. North made an impressive start to his international career on 13 November 2010 in a match against the reigning world champions, by scoring two tries for Wales as they lost to South Africa 29–25 at the Millennium Stadium in Cardiff. He set a number of Welsh and international records in the match:

North, aged 18 years, 214 days, became the youngest player ever to score a try in his debut for Wales. The previous record holder was Tom Pearson, who was aged 18 years, 238 days when he scored against England in 1891. He also became the youngest player ever to have scored two tries against a major rugby nation, whether on his debut or not. The previous record holder was James O'Connor of Australia, who was aged 18 years, 343 days when he scored a hat-trick against Italy in 2009. (Taylor Paris of Canada turned 18 in October 2010 and scored two tries in his second appearance against Spain on the same day as North's debut, but Spain is also not considered a major rugby nation, although they have qualified for one World Cup.)

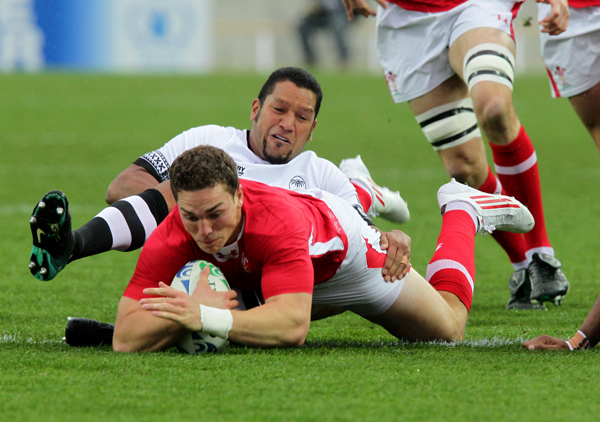
North scoring against Fiji in the Pool D match at the 2011 Rugby World Cup

Following his international debut at the 2010 end-of-year tests, North soon became a regular fixture for Wales in their starting XV. He was not picked to play for Wales for most of the 2011 Six Nations as coach Warren Gatland generally opted for more experienced wingers Shane Williams and Morgan Stoddart, however during the final weekend of the tournament North was given his opportunity to start on the left wing against France, as Williams was not picked to play and Stoddart was on the replacements bench.

After the World Cup, North continued in his place as a regular starter for Wales. He scored a late try as Wales beat Ireland 23–21 in the opening game of the 2012 Six Nations, and he went on to start all four of the remaining matches as Wales claimed their first Grand Slam since 2008. He then played in every minute of the 2013 Six Nations, scoring the only try of the game as Wales won their first match away to France since 2005. Defeat to Ireland on the opening weekend meant Wales needed a seven-point margin of victory against England in their final match to claim the title; although North failed to score, they ended up winning 30–3 and retained the title for the first time since 1979.

==== 2014–2017 ====
North competed for Wales during the 2014 Six Nations, and started all five matches, including a switch to outside centre against France, with Wales hoping that North's size and strength would make him an adequate opponent against the 19-stone frame of Mathieu Bastareaud, who was starting in the same position for Les Bleus. The plan worked, as Wales won 27–6, with North scoring a try after 5 minutes of play.

North played four of Wales' five games during the 2015 Six Nations, only missing the match against Scotland in the second round due to a concussion he suffered against England the week before.

At the 2015 Rugby World Cup, North played in all but one of Wales' pool matches, rested for the opening match against the bottom side in the group, Uruguay. Although North failed to score, Wales recorded wins against Uruguay, England and Fiji, but defeat to Australia in the final pool match, in which North started at outside centre, meant they finished second in the pool and faced South Africa in the quarter-final at Twickenham. North returned to his usual position on the wing and played the full 80 minutes, but again failed to score and Wales ended up losing 23–19.

North played for Wales during the 2016 Six Nations, scoring tries against Scotland, France, England and Italy.

The winger was selected in the Wales squad for the Autumn Internationals and after Premiership Rugby decided to allow Welsh players to be selected for the opening test on 5 November 2016, despite that falling outside the designated International window, earned his 63rd cap for Wales against Australia on that day.

After heavy criticism from his coaches and the media in 2017, North scored three tries in the 2017 Six Nations, one against Italy on 5 February and a double against Ireland on 10 March, becoming the joint-highest try scorer of the tournament with seven other players. His two tries against Ireland bought his career tally to 32, making him the fourth highest try scorer in Welsh history. After New Zealand winger Julian Savea was dropped from the team for the 2017 Rugby Championship, this made North the highest try scored of all currently active Tier 1 international players.

==== 2018–2024 ====
After missing the 2017 end-of-year tests due to injury, North was included in the Welsh squad for the 2018 Six Nations Championship. North did not play in the first week of the competition and returned from injury to play against England on 10 February 2018. Due to stiff competition for a starting place in the competition, North replaced Rhys Patchell off the bench against England with Wales losing 6–12. North was used as a replacement again in the second round of the competition before gaining his starting spot on the right wing back for the final two. North's performance against Italy on 11 March 2018 produced his only two tries of the 2018 Six Nations and allowed Wales to beat Italy 38–14. North's two tries in the 2018 Six Nations bought his career tally to 34. He then featured in all three tests of Wales' summer tour, scoring a try in the first test against Argentina in San Juan, and three of the four autumn internationals, scoring his 36th test try against Scotland and performing well against both Australia and South Africa.

North's impressive return to form following his move back to Wales meant that he was an automatic choice for Wales' 2019 Six Nations Championship squad, and the starting XV against France. Despite a sloppy first half performance that allowed Yoann Huget to score in the left corner, North gave one of his best recent performances in the second half, scoring two tries and winning the Man of the Match award. North became a grand slam champion for the second time in his career, in the 2019 Six Nations, as they beat Ireland 25–7 in Cardiff.

North was part of the Wales squad for the 2019 Rugby World Cup, scoring a try in the 76th minute of their match against Georgia.

He underwent a positional shift under new Wales coach Wayne Pivac, moving to outside centre. North found success in this position, scoring against Ireland in Wales' first match of the 2021 Six Nations Championship.

North became the youngest player to earn 100 caps for Wales in the match against England on 27 February 2021.

North held the record for the most tries in international rugby for an active player. He is the second highest all time try scorer for Wales behind Shane Williams.

On 13 March 2024, North announced his retirement from international rugby following the 2024 Six Nations Championship.

==== 2011 Rugby World Cup ====
After Morgan Stoddart suffered a broken leg during a World Cup warm-up match against England, North was called up as a first-choice winger for Wales for the 2011 Rugby World Cup held in New Zealand. He started on the left wing for Wales' first Pool D match against South Africa, which they narrowly lost by a score of 17–16 against the reigning world champions. North again started on the wing against Samoa and then came on as a replacement in the 55th minute against Namibia, scoring two tries in the latter. He then started against Fiji, scoring a try.

North started on the right wing in Wales' 22–10 win over Ireland in their quarter-final. They went on to face France in the semi-finals, but lost 9–8, with North again on the right wing.

=== British and Irish Lions ===
==== 2013–2017 ====
He was named as part of the Lions squad for the 2013 British & Irish Lions tour to Australia.

On 22 June in Brisbane, North scored the first Lions try vs Australia; a run from inside his own 10-metre line beating four players. However, North's celebration was slightly over exuberant and he later apologised, saying he felt 'horrendous' after making a triumphant gesture towards Will Genia. The Lions went on to win the First Test 23–21.

On 29 June 2013, North carried out a 'fireman's lift' manoeuvre on Australia's Israel Folau while running with the ball in the second test between the Lions and Australia in Melbourne.

On 6 July 2013, in Sydney, North scored his 14th international try and his second Lions Test try as the Lions sealed a 2–1 series win over Australia with a 41–16 victory.

North was selected by the British & Irish Lions for their tour of New Zealand, alongside his Northampton team-mate Courtney Lawes. North played in three fixtures on the tour but was sent home early with fellow injured back Robbie Henshaw after tearing his hamstring.

After suffering an ACL injury in April 2021, North was ruled out of the 2021 British & Irish Lions tour to South Africa.

=== Barbarians ===
In June 2026, North played his final rugby game for the Barbarians scoring two tries in the match, losing 33-31 to Wales in an international friendly held at Twickenham Stadium.

== Personal life ==
In June 2019 North married his long-term partner, the Olympic cyclist Becky James. On 5 May 2020 the couple announced the birth of their first child.

== Honours ==
In November 2026, George North was appointed Honorary Colonel of the 157 (Welsh) Regiment RLC.
