= George Naoupu =

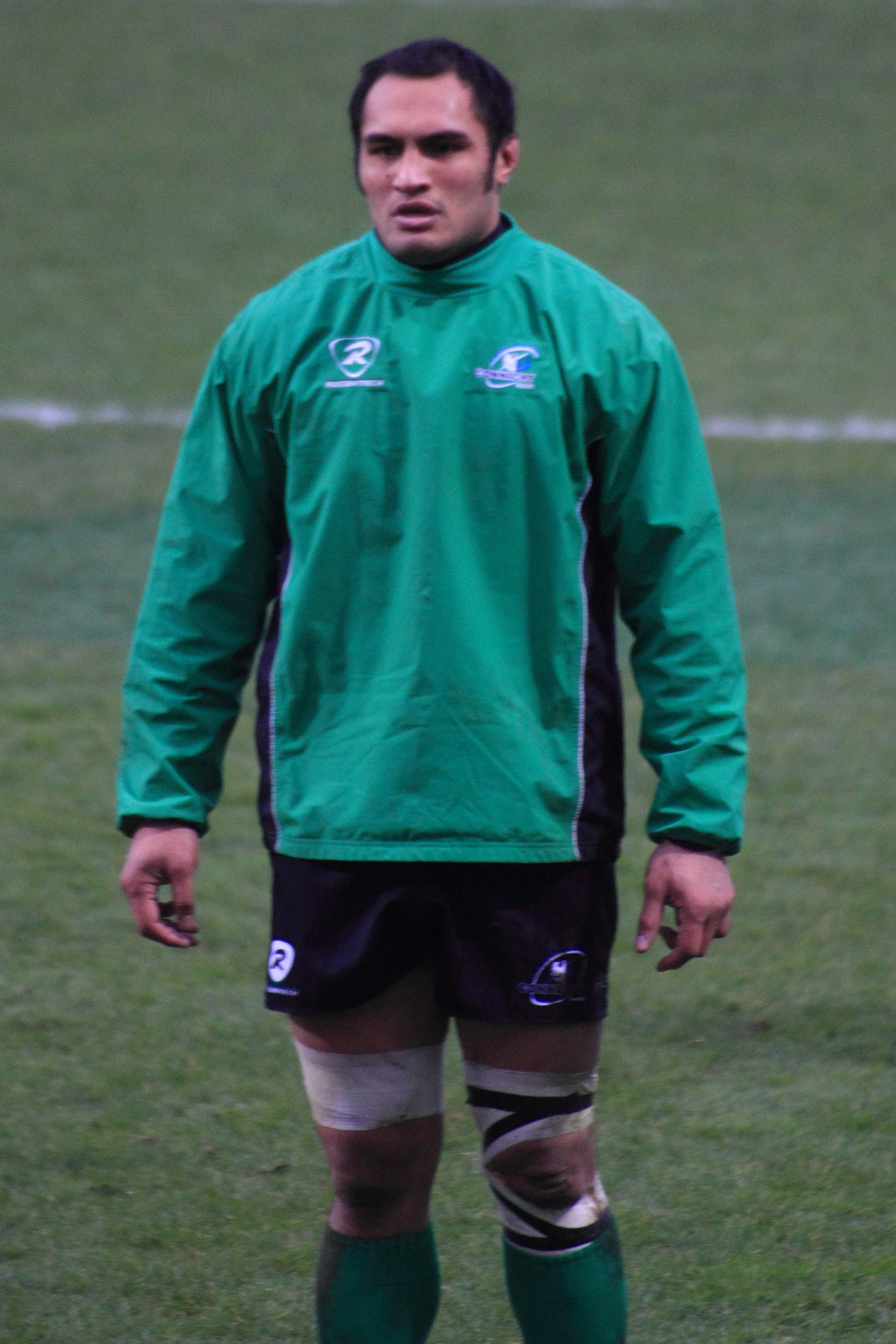
- Naoupu before Connacht's 2011–12 Heineken Cup game away to Toulouse
- Born: 4 September 1983 (age 43) Christchurch, New Zealand
- Height: 1.96 m (6 ft 5 in)
- Weight: 124 kg (19 st 7 lb)
- Notable relative: Julianna Naoupu (sister)

Rugby union career
- Position(s): Flanker, Lock
Senior career
Years	Team	Apps	(Points)
2010–2011	Kobelco		
2016–2017	Harlequins		
Provincial / State sides
Years	Team	Apps	(Points)
2004–2005	Canterbury	9	(5)
2006	Tasman	9	(0)
2007–2009	Hawke's Bay	27	(20)
2009–2010	Connacht	14	(15)
2011–2016	Connacht	103	(30)
- Correct as of 29 Jul 2016
Super Rugby
Years	Team	Apps	(Points)
2008–2009	Highlanders	11	(5)
International career
Years	Team	Apps	(Points)
2001	New Zealand Schools		
2002	New Zealand U19 New Zealand U21		
National sevens team
Years	Team		Comps
2005	New Zealand		
Coaching career
- Years: Team
- 2017–2019: Wicklow (player-coach)

George Naoupu (born 4 September 1983) is a former professional rugby union player from New Zealand. He played at number 8, as a flanker or in the second row.

Naoupu's sister, Julianna Naoupu, is a Samoan netball international.

== Club career ==
=== Career in New Zealand ===
Naoupu's professional career began in 2004 with Canterbury, where he played for two seasons. He then joined Tasman Makos for a season before moving to Hawke's Bay. He made the breakthrough to Super Rugby in 2008 with the Highlanders in his second season at Hawkes Bay.

=== Move to Ireland ===
Naoupu left Highlanders in 2009, moving to Irish provincial side Connacht. Joining ahead of the 2009–10 season, Naoupu made his debut for the side in a 2009–10 European Challenge Cup game with Worcester Warriors on 12 December 2009. He made his league debut in the province's 2009–10 Celtic League game against Irish rivals Munster on 26 December that year, starting the game and playing the full 80 minutes. Naoupu played another seven league games for the side, starting in all of them and scoring a try. In Europe, Naoupu played six of Connacht's eight games as they reached the last four, and scored two tries against Olympus Madrid. He started for Connacht in the semi-final on 29 April 2010, where they were narrowly beaten by a Jonny Wilkinson-inspired Toulon side.

Naoupu departed Connacht at the end of his first season. He moved to Japan, having agreed a deal with Top League side Kobelco Steelers.

=== Japanese rugby ===
Naoupu joined Japanese side Kobelco Steelers for the 2010–11 season. During his time at the club, the team finished fifth in the 2010–11 Top League, missing out on the title play-offs by one position, and were level on points with Suntory Sungoliath who came fourth.

Though the Steelers failed to make their league's title play-offs, they did reach the 48th All Japan Rugby Football Championship through a wild card play-off. The Steelers reached the semi-finals, but were narrowly beaten 37–33 by Suntory, who went on to win the final.

=== Return to Connacht ===
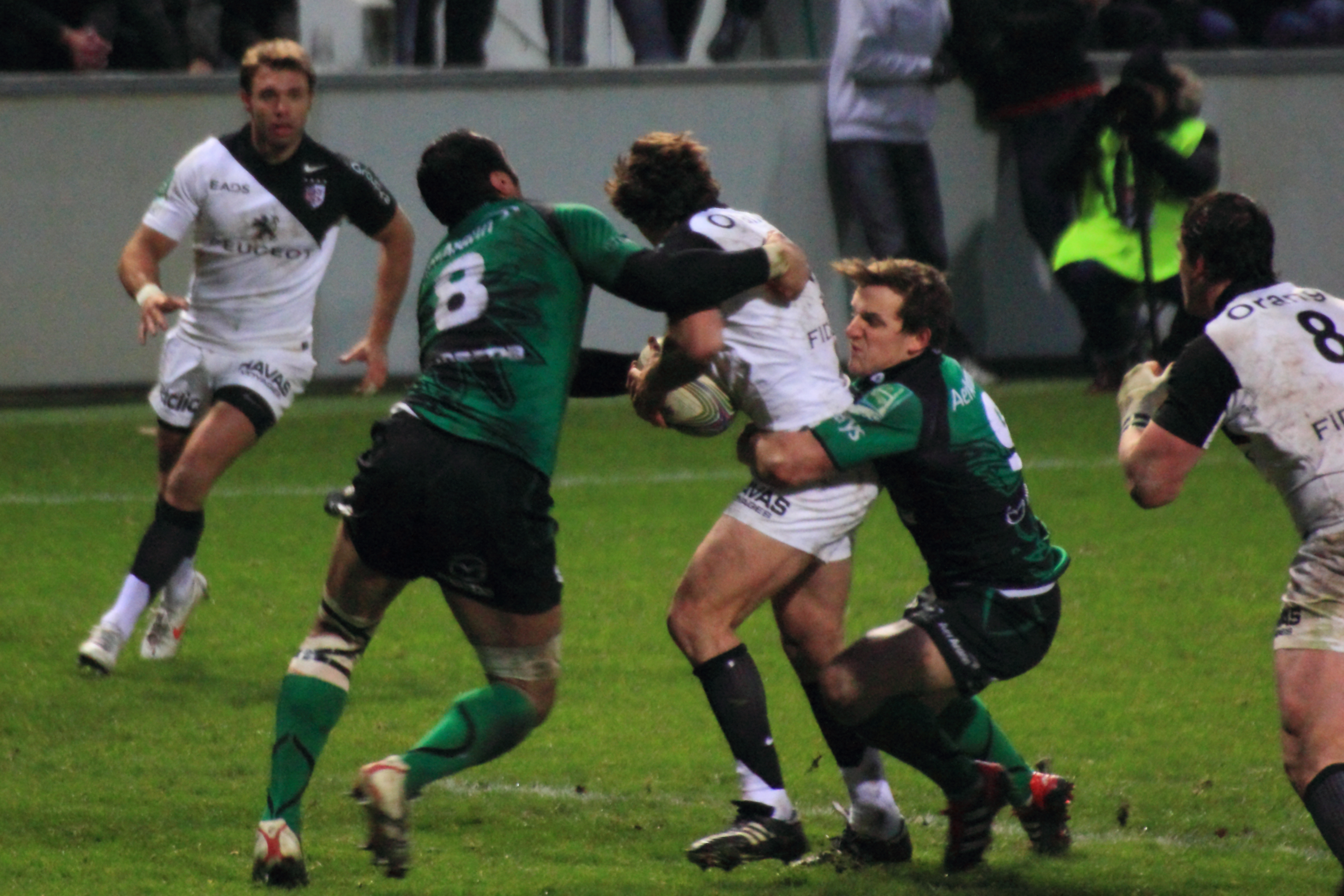
Naoupu (No. 8) playing against Toulouse in the 2011–12 Heineken Cup

Following one season in Japan, Naoupu returned to play for Connacht in the 2011–12 season. When he returned the Celtic League had been renamed the Pro12, and Connacht had qualified for the Heineken Cup, Europe's top club competition, for the first ever time. Naoupu made his first appearance since returning in the opening game of the 2011–12 Pro12, starting against Benetton Treviso on 3 September 2011, and playing the full 80 minutes. Naoupu made his first appearance at the top level of European rugby on 11 November 2011, when he started against Harlequins in Connacht's opening 2011–12 Heineken Cup game. Naoupu also started in all five other games the province played in the competition, including Connacht's first ever win at that level, in the return game with Harlequins on 20 January 2012. He made a total of 17 league appearances for the season, starting in all the games he played.

The 2012–13 season saw Naoupu play fewer games in total, but put in several strong performances. He played 14 games in the 2012–13 Pro12, starting all but one, and scoring four tries. Over the course of the season, Naoupu faced competition from Academy graduate Eoin McKeon for the number 8 position. In the 2012–13 Heineken Cup, he started two games and came on as a replacement in another. In January 2013, it was announced that Naoupu had been offered a contract extension on the back of his good form, agreeing a deal to stay with Connacht until the end of the 2014–15 season.

In the following season, Naoupu was again vying with McKeon for the starting position on the team. Naoupu started the first two games of the 2013–14 Pro12 against Zebre and Cardiff Blues, and was used as a replacement in the next two. The 2013–14 Heineken Cup saw Naoupu start in half of Connacht's games and come on as a replacement in the other three. He scored his first ever European try on 19 October 2013 against Zebre. Naoupu suffered an injury in February 2014 however, which ruled him out for the rest of the season and he ended up making a total of 14 league appearances, with just six of these coming as starts.

== Retirement from Professional Rugby ==
Naoupu announced his retirement from professional rugby in July 2017. Naoupu joined the amateur club, Wicklow RFC, as player/coach for the 2017–18 season .

== International ==
Naoupu represented New Zealand at both schools and under 19 level. Naoupu has also played for his country in rugby sevens, meaning he cannot qualify for Ireland through residency as he is committed to New Zealand under IRB regulations.
