= Samuele Pace =

Italy international rugby union player

- Born: 20 January 1980 (age 46) Ponte dell'Olio, Italy
- Height: 1.85 m (6 ft 1 in)
- Weight: 90 kg (14 st 2 lb; 198 lb)

Rugby union career
- Position: Wing
Youth career
- Parma
Senior career
Years	Team	Apps	(Points)
2000−2004	Parma		
2004	Colorno		
2004−2010	Viadana	79	(115)
2010−2012	Rovigo Delta	43	(55)
2012−2013	Zebre	13	(10)
2013−2015	Colorno		
- Correct as of 28 May 2020
International career
Years	Team	Apps	(Points)
2009−2010	Italy A	6	(0)
2001−2005	Italy	3	(0)
- Correct as of 28 May 2020
Coaching career
- Years: Team
- 2020–: Colorno (assistant coach)

Samuele Pace (Ponte dell'Olio, 20 January 1980) is a retired Italian rugby union player and his usual position was Wing.

In 2012–13 Pro12 season, he played for Zebre.

In 2009 and 2010 Pace was named in the Italy A squad for IRB Nations Cup and he represented Italy on 3 occasions, from 2001 to 2005.
