= Ysgol Uwchradd Bodedern =

Secondary school in Anglesey, Wales

Location
- Bodedern, Anglesey; Wales; 53.2906°N 4.5049°W

Information
- Type: Secondary School
- Motto: "Hau i Fedi"
- Opened: 1977
- Local authority: Isle of Anglesey County Council
- Head teacher: Paul Matthew Jones
- Gender: Mixed
- Age: 11 to 18
- Enrolment: 774 (2023)
- Colours: Navy, Red. White shirts for the Sixth form.
- Website: http://www.ysgoluwchraddbodedern.org/eng/ysgol.html

Ysgol Uwchradd Bodedern is a co-educational secondary school in Bodedern, Anglesey, Wales first opened in 1977. It is a bilingual establishment run by Anglesey County Council.

== History ==
Ysgol Uwchradd Bodedern opened on 6 September 1977 and the headteacher was Carol Hughes. It replaced the old National School in London Road which was then demolished in 1984. The school's symbol, designed by artist Tegwyn Francis Jones, is a thumb pressing seeds into the earth (hence the motto 'hau i fedi' or 'sowing to harvest').

Initially, it operated as a small primary school, but with the passage of time and growing population in the region, there arose a need for a secondary education facility.

In 1956, Ysgol Uwchradd Bodedern was officially established as a secondary school, offering education to students from the surrounding areas. Initially, the school was modest in size, with a few classrooms and limited facilities. However, over the years, it expanded both in terms of infrastructure and academic offerings.

During the latter half of the 20th century, Ysgol Uwchradd Bodedern underwent several developments, reflecting changes in educational policies and societal needs. The school adapted to new curricula and teaching methodologies.

== The school in 2017 ==
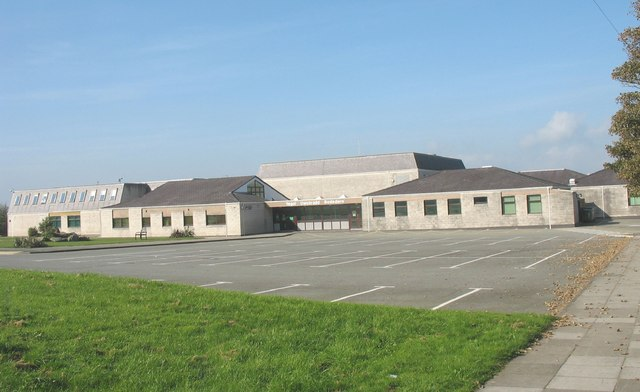
Front of Ysgol Uwchradd Bodedern

Pupils have the choice of studying a subject through the medium of English or Welsh. At GCSE, nearly all pupils must study at least two subjects in English and two in Welsh, in addition to English and Welsh as individual subjects.

There are around 1000 pupils at the school. The school facilities are available for public use during the evenings.

== Controversies ==
In 2019, Headmistress Catrin Jones Hughes faced a vote of no confidence following a scandal. 60% of staff were unhappy with her performance. In 2020, she resigned. Robert Dalling (17 October 2025). "Welsh teen left completely lifeless after vape spiked with drugs at school". WalesOnline. Reach plc.

== Notable former pupils ==
- George North, rugby player
- Gareth Williams, GCHQ employee
