= Nathan Trevett =

- Born: Nathan Trevett; 23 March 1985 (age 41), Wales
- Height: 177 cm (5 ft 10 in)
- Weight: 119 kg (18 st 10 lb)

Rugby union career
- Position: Prop
- Current team: London Welsh
Senior career
Years	Team	Apps	(Points)
2011–2013	Cardiff Blues	29	(5)
2013–	London Welsh		
- Correct as of 10 November 2012

Nathan Trevett (born 23 March 1985) is a Welsh rugby union player. A prop, he plays club rugby for London Welsh after he signed from Welsh region Cardiff Blues for the 2013–14 season
