= Daniel Halangahu =

Australian rugby union player (born 1984)

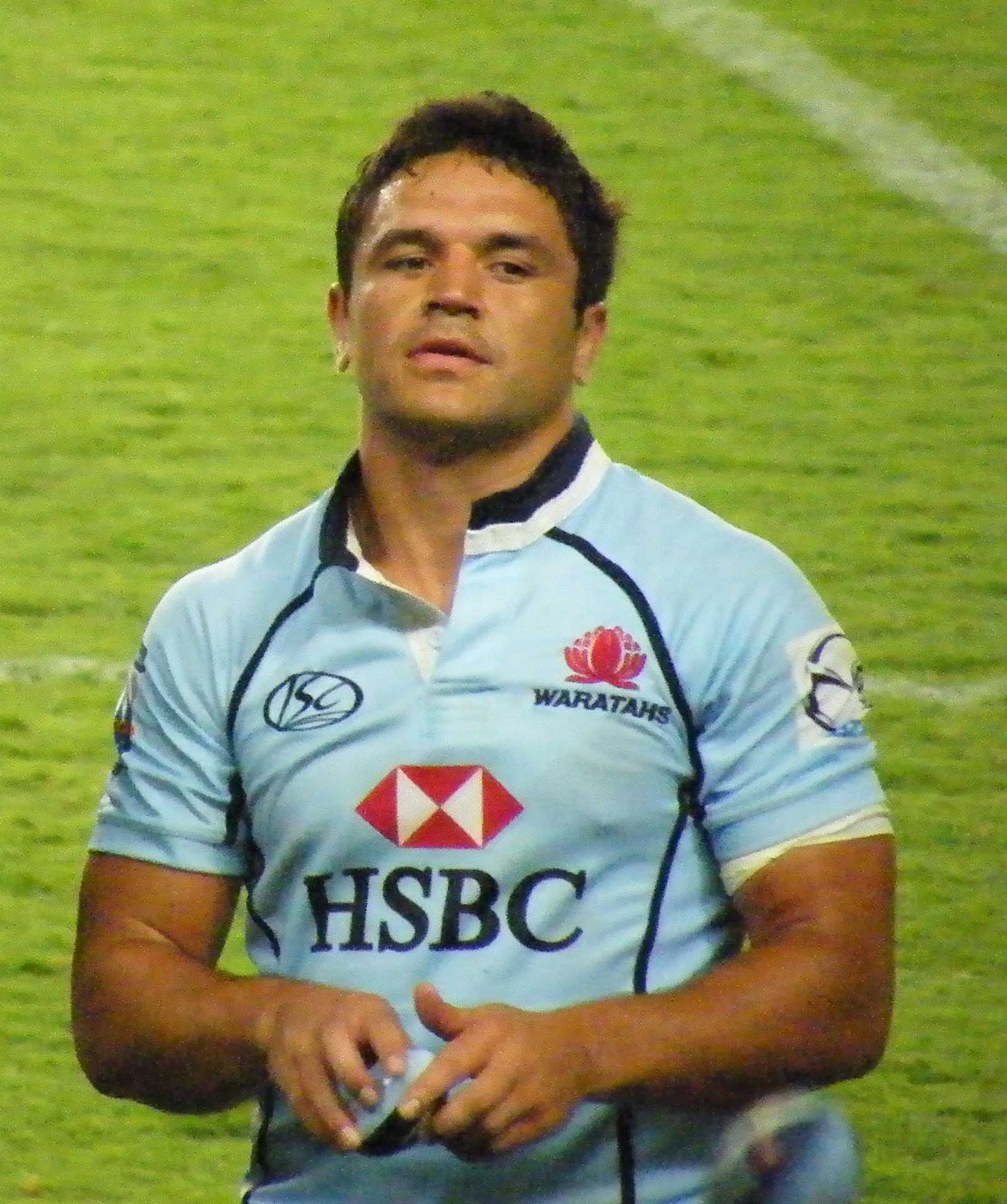
- Born: Daniel Halangahu; 6 March 1984 (age 42) Belmont, New South Wales, Australia
- Height: 1.78 m (5 ft 10 in)
- Weight: 90 kg (14 st 2 lb; 200 lb)
- School: The King’s School, Sydney

Rugby union career
- Position: Fly-half / Fullback
- Current team: Sydney University
Senior career
Years	Team	Apps	(Points)
2007	Sydney Fleet	7	(42)
2012–13	Zebre	19	(109)
2014−15	RC Narbonne	38	(299)
- Correct as of 13 February 2014
Provincial / State sides
Years	Team	Apps	(Points)
2014–2015	North Harbour	17	(91)
- Correct as of 12 October 2015
Super Rugby
Years	Team	Apps	(Points)
2006–12	Waratahs	74	(214)
- Correct as of 24 July 2012
Coaching career
- Years: Team
- 2016-: North Harbour

Daniel Halangahu (born 6 March 1984) is an Australian professional rugby union assistant coach for North Harbour Rugby Union in the Mitre 10 Cup competition. He is a former professional player and played primarily as a Out Half and retired in 2015. He is also currently assistant coach for the Auckland Blues.

== Personal life ==
Halangahu was born 6 March 1984 in Belmont, New South Wales. He grew up in Yass, NSW, a small town 30 mins outside of Canberra. He is of Tongan descent. He has an older sister Trish and an older brother Antonio who is club captain at Randwick RFC. Daniel is married to Nadia Marsh.

== Early life ==
Daniel attended Daramalan College in Canberra before attending The King's School, Sydney, along with fellow Waratahs Benn Robinson, Dean Mumm, Will Caldwell. He played in The King's School 1st XV rugby team in 2002, which won the GPS title that year.

== Representative rugby ==
In 2008, Halangahu was selected for Australia A to play in the Pacific Nations Cup.
