= Dafydd Hewitt =

- Born: Dafydd Hewitt; 21 August 1985 (age 41) Cardiff, Wales
- Height: 5 ft 11 in (1.80 m)
- Weight: 98 kg (216 lb)

Rugby union career
- Position: Centre
Senior career
Years	Team	Apps	(Points)
2006–2015	Cardiff Blues	122	(10)
National sevens team
Years	Team		Comps
2009	Wales		
Medal record
Men's rugby sevens
Representing Wales
Rugby World Cup Sevens
Gold medal – first place	2009 Dubai	Team competition

Dafydd Hewitt (born 21 August 1985) is a retired Welsh rugby union player.

A centre, from Llantwit Major RFC he played at every level for his local club before stepping up to regional rugby in 2004 with the Cardiff Blues. He was selected for the Wales national rugby sevens team squad in 2007. Hewitt captained Wales Under 21s at the 2006 Under 21 Rugby World Championship. Hewitt's brother Rhys plays at hooker for Bridgend Ravens.

Having been selected as one of four club Vice Captains for 2012/13 season, after making only two appearances in 2014–15 season, Hewitt retired in April 2015 on medical advice due to a persistent neck injury.
