= Alberto Di Bernardo =

Italy international rugby union player

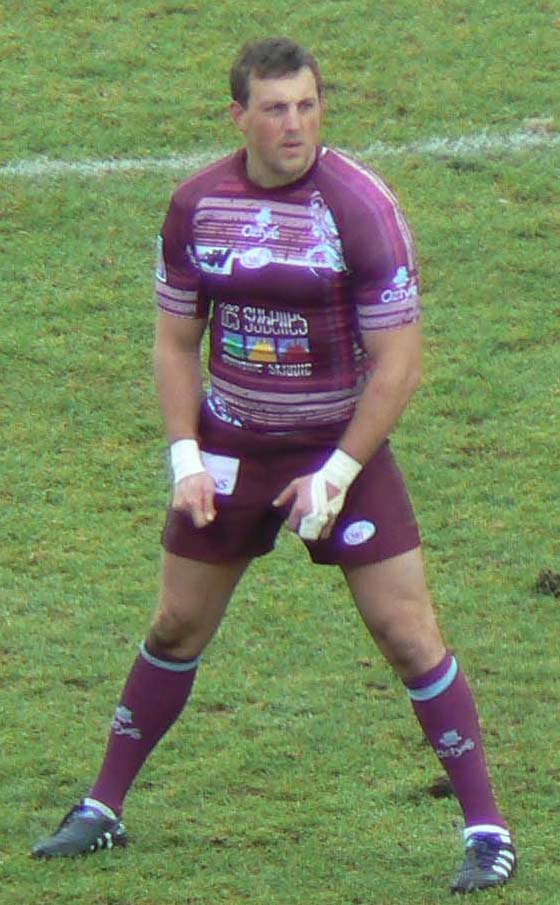
- Full name: Alberto Di Bernardo
- Born: 4 November 1980 (age 46) Rosario, Santa Fe, Argentina
- Height: 1.78 m (5 ft 10 in)
- Weight: 87 kg (13 st 10 lb; 192 lb)

Rugby union career
- Position: Fly-Half
- Current team: Benetton
Senior career
Years	Team	Apps	(Points)
2005-06	Jockey Club Rosario		
2006	L'Aquila	5	(31)
2006–07	Cornish Pirates		
2007–09	Leeds Carnegie	24	(206)
2009–11	Bourgoin	38	(250)
2011–14	Benetton	44	(184)
2014–15	Jockey Club Rosario	6	(48)
- Correct as of 13 November 2013
International career
Years	Team	Apps	(Points)
2005	Italy A		
2013	Italy	4	(31)
- Correct as of 13 November 2013

Alberto Di Bernardo (born 4 November 1980 in Rosario, Argentina) is an Italian/Argentine rugby union player, who gained four caps for Italy in 2013. He played club rugby for Treviso in Celtic League, Leeds Carnegie in Premiership Rugby and for Bourgoin in the Top 14. His usual position is at fly-half and he has played for Italy A.

He played for Italy ‘A’ in the side that were beaten by Tonga 33–27 in November 2005, his kicking helping to keep up the pressure on Tonga.

In 2007 he started his life as a Leeds Carnegie player and secured them a place in the top flight of English rugby, the Guinness Premiership. After bouncing back between the top and second division, he decided to leave Leeds behind and take on the challenge of playing for Bourgoin in the Top 14.
