= Richard Fussell =

Welsh rugby union player

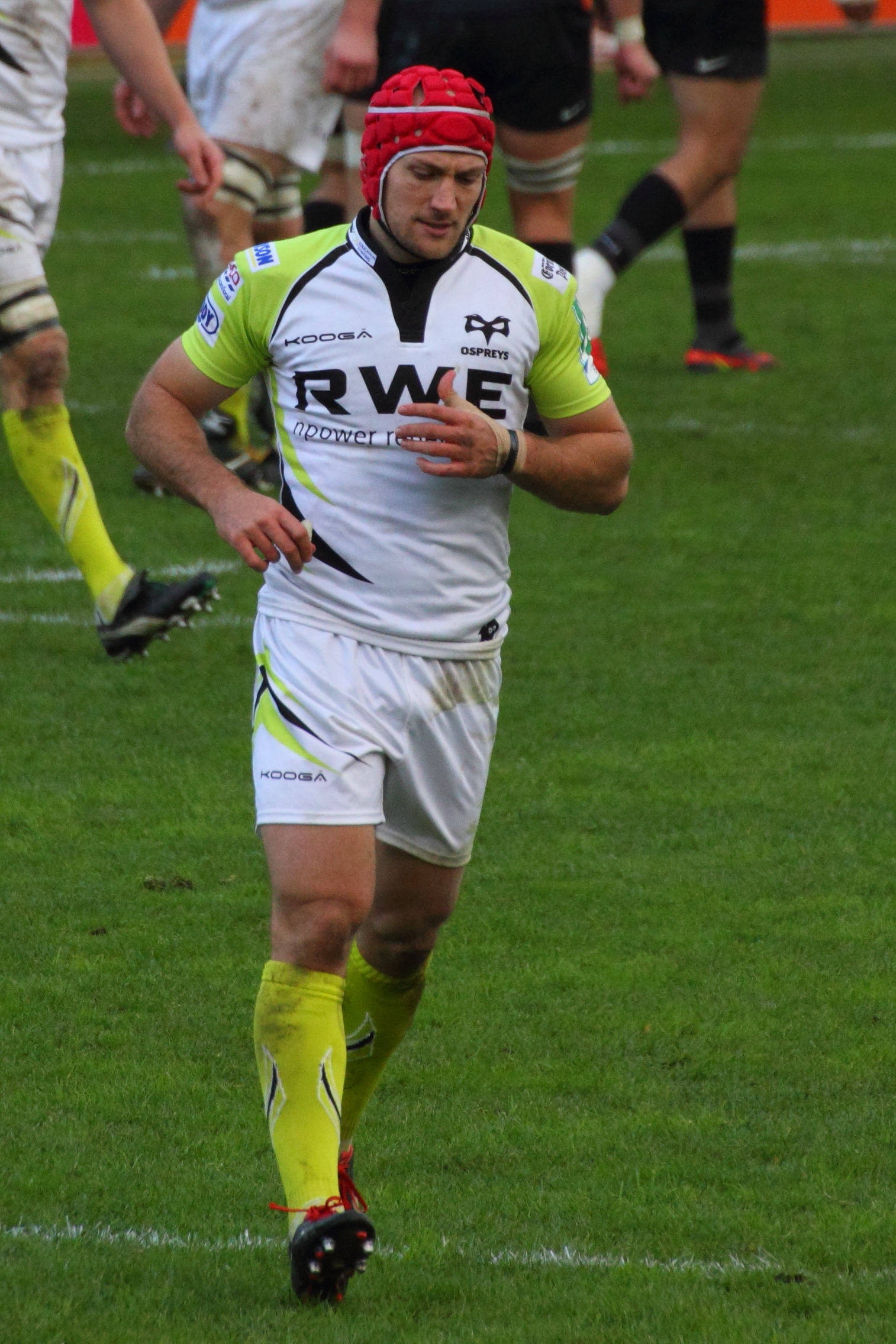
- Born: Richard Fussell; 12 April 1984 (age 42) Bedlinog, South Wales
- Height: 5 ft 11 in (1.80 m)
- Weight: 13 st 9 lb (191 lb; 87 kg)

Rugby union career
- Position(s): Wing, Fullback
Youth career
- Ebbw Vale
Senior career
Years	Team	Apps	(Points)
2003–2005	Pontypridd	46	(105)
2005–2010	Newport GD	82	(120)
2010–2016	Ospreys	116	(95)
- Correct as of 21 December 2022
Coaching career
- Years: Team
- 2016–2018: Ospreys (skills)
- 2018–2020: Ospreys (development)
- 2021: Wales U20 (assistant)
- 2022–: Ospreys (attack)

Richard Fussell is a former professional Welsh rugby union winger. During his career, he represented Pontypridd RFC, Newport Gwent Dragons, and the Ospreys.

== Playing career ==
Hailing from the mountain-top village of Bedlinog near Merthyr Tydfil, Fussell moved down to nearby Nelson to play his junior rugby.

Having represented Ebbw Vale at youth level he elected to join up with the thriving Pontypridd RFC Academy in 2001, with international honours for Wales at under 17, under 18 and under 19 levels to his name.

Fussell played as a winger and joined the Pontypridd senior squad toward the end of the 2002–03 season. He scored five tries in five appearances.

Having cemented his place in the Pontypridd senior squad, Fussell's great promise was backed up by an invitation to train with the late Celtic Warriors regional team. Fussell went on to register 21 tries for Pontypridd in his 46 appearances for the club.

Fussell left Pontypridd in the 2005 close season to pursue a career with the Newport Gwent Dragons. Fussell joined the Ospreys for the 2010–11 season on a 2-year contract. Fussell was named as the player of the year, in his first season with the Ospreys. Fussell was part of the Ospreys squad that won the 2011–12 Pro12, starting at fullback in the final as the Ospreys beat Leinster 31–30 at the RDS Arena.

After six seasons with the Ospreys, Fussell retired in 2016.

== Coaching career ==
Upon retiring, Fussell was named as the backs skills coach for the Ospreys.

Fussell was named as head coach of the Ospreys Development team in 2018.

Alongside fellow former Ospreys Paul James, Fussell joined the Wales U20 coaching team in 2021 as an assistant coach for the 2021 Six Nations Under 20s Championship.

In 2022, Fussell was promoted to Attack Coach for the Ospreys first team, replacing Brock James.
