= Tom Prydie =

Wales international rugby union footballer

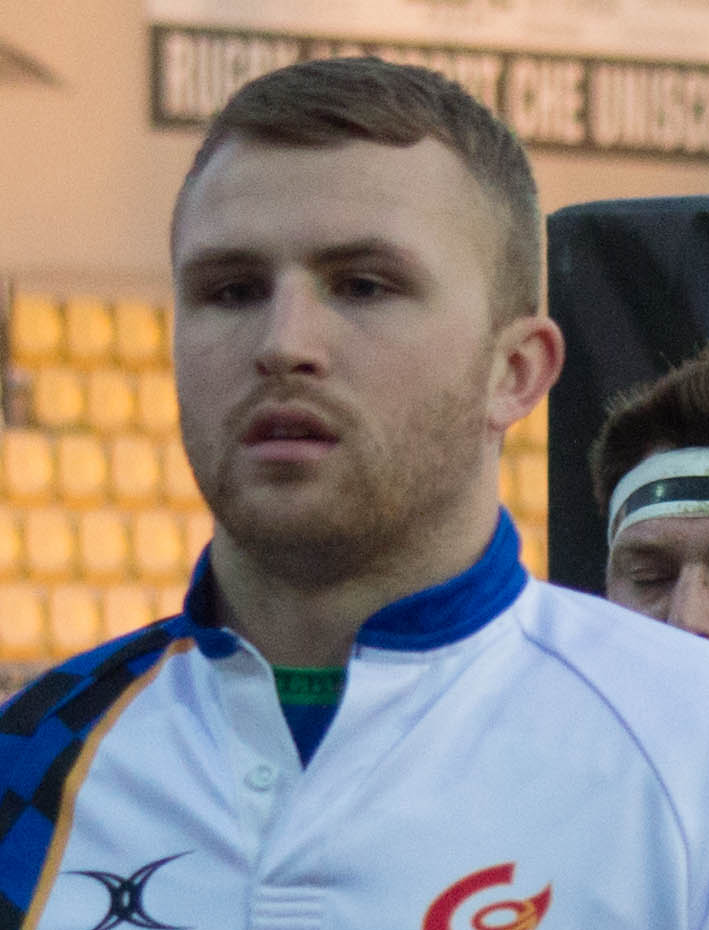
- Born: Tom Prydie; 23 February 1992 (age 34) Porthcawl, Wales
- Height: 6 ft 4 in (1.93 m)
- Weight: 15 st 3 lb (97 kg; 213 lb)

Rugby union career
- Position(s): Wing; Fullback
Amateur team(s)
Years	Team	Apps	(Points)
–	Porthcawl		
–	Bridgend Athletic		
Senior career
Years	Team	Apps	(Points)
2009–2012	Ospreys	12	(22)
2011–2012	→Wasps	6	(0)
2012–2017	Dragons	93	(447)
2017–2021	Scarlets	34	(43)
2021–2022	Bath	3	(0)
International career
Years	Team	Apps	(Points)
2012	Wales U20	3	(0)
2010–2018	Wales	7	(10)
National sevens team
Years	Team		Comps
2011–2012	Wales		

Tom Prydie (born 23 February 1992) is a Welsh rugby union player. A fullback who can also play on the wing, Prydie is the youngest player ever to represent the Wales national team and the youngest player in the history of Europe's top rugby union club competition, the Heineken Cup.

== Early life ==
Born in Porthcawl, a seaside resort near Bridgend, Prydie primarily played football in his early childhood. He represented his primary school, Nottage, at under 11s rugby, within the Bridgend and District Schools' RU. He played for West Wales A (Under 11s) in their victory over East Wales at Virginia Park, Caerphilly RFC, on 10 April 2003.

He made his first ever appearance at the Millennium Stadium on 3 May 2003, when he represented Bridgend Schools' Under 11s v. Cardiff Schools' Under 11s, in the final of the DCThomas Cup.

== Club career ==
His rise to prominence began in summer 2009, when he was noticed by Scott Johnson, the director of coaching for the Ospreys regional team. Prydie was then fast-tracked through the Ospreys age-grade system, and by the end of the year was in the senior side. He made his Ospreys senior debut on 12 December 2009 as a second-half replacement in their Heineken Cup match against Viadana. This made him the youngest player in Heineken Cup history at age 17 years, 292 days, beating the previous record of Leicester Tigers' Richard Governley by 16 days.

In January 2012 it was announced he along with Leicester's Lee Robinson would be joining London Wasps until the end of the season to cover injured duo Christian Wade and Tom Varndell

In May 2012 Prydie joined Newport Gwent Dragons He was released at the end of the 2016–17 season.

In May 2017, he left Dragons to join rivals Scarlets ahead of the 2017-18 season.

On 7 December 2021, after his release from Scarlets, Prydie has signed a short-term deal with English Premiership side Bath for the 2021-22 season.

== International career ==
On 18 January 2010 Prydie, aged 17, was a surprise inclusion in the 35-man Wales national squad named for the 2010 Six Nations despite playing just seven minutes for the Welsh region the Ospreys. Despite media speculation that Prydie would be named in the squad, he was still shocked at his selection. He was notified by a text message from Wales national coach Warren Gatland only 20 minutes before the public announcement of the squad; he initially thought that the message was part of an elaborate practical joke by some of his Ospreys teammates. At the time of his selection, Prydie had never met or spoken to Gatland.

Prydie was named on the wing in the starting team for Wales' final 2010 Six Nations match against Italy and became the youngest cap in Wales' rugby history. The previous youngest to play for Wales was Norman Biggs, who was 18 years, 49 days old when he made his debut in 1888 against the New Zealand Natives. Prydie was 18 years, 25 days old at the time of the Italy match on 20 March. Prydie, who by the time of the Italy match had made only two starts and played 167 minutes for the Ospreys senior side, also surpassed Mathew Tait of England as the youngest ever to play in the Six Nations.

In June 2010 Prydie became Wales youngest try scorer at 18 years and 102 days against South Africa, overtaking the record set by Tom Pearson in 1891.

In 2012 Prydie made his debut for the Wales under-20 team in the Junior World Championships, two years after making his debut for the Wales senior team.

In May 2013 he was selected in the Wales national rugby union team 32-man training squad for the summer 2013 tour to Japan. His appearance in the second test that year would be his last international appearance for Wales for five years before a surprise recall into the squad in for the 2018 June rugby union tests where he made a further two appearances against South Africa and Argentina.
