= 2015–16 Connacht Rugby season =

Connacht
- 2015–16 season
- Head coach: Pat Lam
- Chief executive: Willie Ruane
- Captain: John Muldoon
- Pro12: 2nd (champions)
- Challenge Cup: Quarter-finals
- Top try scorer: All: Matt Healy (13)
- Top points scorer: All: Jack Carty (99)
- Highest home attendance: 7,800 v Glasgow Warriors; 21 May 2016
- Lowest home attendance: 3,274 v Cardiff Blues; 3 October 2015
- Average home attendance: 5,217
Home colours	Away colours	Third colours

The 2015–16 season was Irish provincial rugby union side Connacht Rugby's fifteenth season competing in the Pro12, and the team's twentieth season as a professional side. It was Pat Lam's third season in charge of the side. Connacht finished the season as league champions after defeating Leinster in the 2016 Pro12 Grand Final, the team's first trophy in its 131-year history.

As well as playing in the Pro12, Connacht competed in the Challenge Cup in Europe, having lost a play-off to enter the Champions Cup. The second-tier side the Connacht Eagles competed in the 2015–16 British and Irish Cup.

== Background ==
=== Competition schedule ===
Having finished seventh in the 2014–15 Pro12 Connacht were entered into a play-off to qualify for the 2015–16 Champions Cup, but were beaten by Gloucester after extra time. Following this defeat, Connacht were entered into the Challenge Cup. On 17 June 2015, Connacht were drawn into Pool 1 of the tournament along with French Top 14 side Brive, Newcastle Falcons from the English Premiership and Russian side Enisey-STM, who had entered the tournament through a qualifying competition.

The early stages of the season were interrupted by the 2015 Rugby World Cup leading to a congested fixture list after the tournament ended. Due to this fixture pile up, Connacht were scheduled to play a game each week for 16 straight weeks after the tournament ended.

=== Personnel changes ===
The team came into the season without their long-serving forwards coach Dan McFarland, following his move to Glasgow Warriors. McFarland had joined Connacht as a player in 2000, where he retired and moved into coaching with the side. He was replaced in the role by Jimmy Duffy, who had previously worked for the province's academy.

On the playing front, the close season saw the retirement of Michael Swift, the team's former captain who had made a record 269 appearances for the province, 184 of these coming in the league, a competition record. The close season also saw the departure of New Zealand centurion Mils Muliaina to Zebre one season after joining Connacht, and the previous season's loan transfers of John Cooney and Quinn Roux made permanent, while lock Mick Kearney re-joined his home province of Leinster with Ben Marshall going in the opposite direction.

== Season ==
=== Pre-season ===
Connacht players returned to training for pre-season on 29 June 2015. Robbie Henshaw and Kieran Marmion were not involved, having returned to training with the Ireland squad earlier in the month, ahead of the World Cup in September. Nathan White was later called into the squad, following an injury to Marty Moore. Marmion did not make the final squad for the tournament.

Connacht played three friendlies in the run up to the season. On 7 August they faced French Top 14 side FC Grenoble, coached by former Connacht player Bernard Jackman, and were beaten 19–52 at home. The following week saw another friendly against Top 14 side, with the team travelling to France to face Castres. Connacht were beaten again, this time by a score of 19–5. The side's final pre-season game came on 21 August, when they faced Irish rivals Munster in Thomond Park. Putting out a near full strength side, Connacht won their final warm up game 12–28.

=== September ===
The opening game of the season was a home game Pro12 game against the Newport Gwent Dragons, with Connacht winning 29–23. The following week saw the team travel to Scotland to face reigning champions Glasgow Warriors. After being down 23–6 at half-time, Connacht battled back in the second half but were ultimately to 33–32, earning two bonus points for the performance. Following the second round, the league took a two-week break.

=== October ===
The competition resumed in October, with Connacht facing Cardiff Blues in Galway, earning a try bonus point with a 36–31 victory. The following week saw the team face Zebre, which yielded another bonus point win. On 26 October, Connacht traveled to the Liberty Stadium to face the Ospreys who had been champions four times in the past. A 16–21 victory saw Connacht win away to the Welsh side for the first time since 2004. On Halloween night, the team hosted Edinburgh at the Sportsgrounds, with a 14–9 victory the result.

=== November ===
On 6 November, Connacht faced Benetton Treviso in Galway, winning 33–19 without collecting a try bonus. The league then took a hiatus to allow European competitions, which had been delayed by the World Cup, to take place. Connacht's opening game in the Challenge Cup saw them face Russian side Enisei-STM in Krasnoyarsk. This meant a near 6,000 kilometre trip to the Siberian city, taking nine hours across two flights for the 24 man squad that traveled. The game was played in temperatures below −20 °C, but Connacht ultimately emerged as 14–31 victors, taking all five points in the process. However, after the game Connacht's return home was delayed. A fault was found with the charter plane before takeoff. This meant alternate plans had to be made, and the travelling party was split into three, with the groups arriving back in Ireland via Amsterdam, London and Paris. Having planned to leave on the night of the game, the latest returning players had been delayed by three days, arriving on Tuesday night with a game against French side Brive to come on Saturday. Despite the travel chaos and delayed return, Connacht defeated Brive 21–17 to go top of their pool.

Connacht returned to Pro12 action on 28 November in their first inter-provincial derby of the season, facing Munster in Thomond Park. Having not won at the venue for 29 years, Connacht pulled off a 12–18 upset, their seventh win from the eight league games played. This left the team top of both the league and their European pool going into December.

=== December ===
Connacht's first game in December was away to Cardiff Blues, which ended in a 20–16 defeat. On 11 December, Connacht faced the Newcastle Falcons in Galway in the Challenge Cup, winning 25–10. A week later saw the return fixture take place in Kingston Park, with Connacht losing 29–5. This left Connacht top of the pool on 13 points, with Newcastle two points behind. In the final game of 2015 Connacht faced Ulster in Galway on Saint Stephen's Day, losing 3–10.

=== January ===
Connacht's first game of 2016 took place on New Year's Day, when they traveled to the RDS Arena to take on Leinster, a game which ended in a 13–0 defeat. On 10 January, the team faced Scarlets in Wales, and were beaten 21–19, taking their Pro12 losing streak to four games. The following week saw a return to European competition, with Connacht travelling to France to face Brive in a game they lost 21–18. The following week, they faced Enisei-STM in Galway, winning 47–5 to top the group. The losses to Brive and Newcastle meant that the team qualified for the quarter-finals with the lowest points tally of the group winners, meaning they would be the away team in their quarter-final, being drawn to face Grenoble, the fourth-highest finishing group winner. On 30 January, Connacht faced Scarlets in the Sportsgrounds and won 30–17, their first Pro12 victory since November.

=== February ===
There was no game in the first week of February due to the beginning of the Six Nations Championship. On 11 February, Connacht faced Newport Gwent Dragons in Rodney Parade, beating them 21–26 and earning a try bonus point to go back to the top of the table. The following week saw the team play Zebre in Italy, a game they won 34–51. In their final game of the month, Connacht faced the Ospreys in the Sportsground, winning 30–22 to extend their lead at the top of the league table.

=== March ===
On 4 March, Connacht faced Edinburgh in Murrayfield and won with a bonus point to maintain their position as league leaders. A break for the end of the Six Nations meant that only two games were played in March. In the second game, Connacht faced second-placed Leinster at home in an inter-provincial derby on 26 March, with a 7–6 victory seeing them extend their lead.

=== April ===
On 1 April, Connacht faced Ulster in Kingspan Stadium with an 18–10 defeat ending their six-game winning streak in the league. The following week saw a return to European action, with the Challenge Cup quarter-final against Grenoble taking place. Despite scoring four tries, Connacht were on the wrong side of a 33–32 scoreline. The team returned to league action on 16 April with another inter-provincial game, this time against Munster. A bonus point win left the team in second place ahead of Glasgow with two rounds to go. Connacht then traveled to Italy to face bottom side Treviso, but in a shocking upset, the Italians won by a score of 22–21 thanks to a last gasp penalty from Jayden Hayward. However, the losing bonus point was enough to guarantee Connacht a top four finish and a first ever spot in the end-of-year playoffs.

=== May ===
On 7 May, Connacht faced Glasgow Warriors in a game that would decide home advantage for the playoff round. Connacht won 14–7 thanks to tries from Bundee Aki and Tiernan O'Halloran, to set up a home semi-final against the same opposition. That semi-final took place on 21 May, with Connacht finishing 16–11 victors to set up a final against Leinster, the province's first final in the professional era.

The final took place on 28 May in Murrayfield. Connacht won the game 20–10, with tries from O'Halloran, Niyi Adeolokun and Matt Healy. Captain and man-of-the-match on the day John Muldoon lifted the trophy, the team's first title in its 131-year history.

== Coaching and Management Team ==
Note: Flags indicate national union as has been defined under WR eligibility rules. Individuals may hold more than one non-WR nationality.

Role	Name	Union
Head coach	Pat Lam	Samoa (Note: New Zealand-born and qualified for Samoa, Lam has represented both countries, but last played rugby for Samoa.)
Team Manager	Tim Allnut	New Zealand
Chief Executive	Willie Ruane	Ireland
Forwards Coach	Jimmy Duffy	Ireland
Backs/Kicking Coach	Andre Bell	New Zealand
Skills Coach	Dave Ellis	New Zealand
Assistant Attack Coach/ Head Performance Analyst	Conor McPhillips	Ireland
Head of Fitness	Paul Bunce	New Zealand
Academy Manager	Nigel Carolan	Ireland

== Players ==
=== Senior Playing Squad ===
Note: Flags indicate national union under World Rugby eligibility rules. Players may hold more than one non-World Rugby nationality.

Player	Position	Union
Jason Harris-Wright	Hooker	Ireland
Dave Heffernan	Hooker	Ireland
Tom McCartney	Hooker	New Zealand
**Rodney Ah You**	Prop	Ireland
**Finlay Bealham**	Prop	Ireland
Denis Buckley	Prop	Ireland
JP Cooney	Prop	Ireland
**Ronan Loughney**	Prop	Ireland
**Nathan White**	Prop	Ireland
Andrew Browne	Lock	Ireland
**Ultan Dillane**	Lock	Ireland
Ben Marshall	Lock	Ireland
Aly Muldowney*	Lock	England
Danny Qualter	Lock	Ireland
Quinn Roux*	Lock	South Africa
Nepia Fox-Matamua	Flanker	New Zealand
Jake Heenan	Flanker	New Zealand
Eoghan Masterson	Flanker	Ireland
**John Muldoon** (c)	Flanker	Ireland
Eoin McKeon	Number 8	Ireland
George Naoupu	Number 8	New Zealand

Player	Position	Union
Caolin Blade	Scrum-half	Ireland
John Cooney	Scrum-half	Ireland
**Kieran Marmion**	Scrum-half	Ireland
Ian Porter	Scrum-half	Ireland
Jack Carty	Fly-half	Ireland
**AJ MacGinty**	Fly-half	United States
Shane O'Leary*	Fly-half	Canada
Bundee Aki	Centre	New Zealand
Conor Finn	Centre	Ireland
**Robbie Henshaw**	Centre	Ireland
Dave McSharry	Centre	Ireland
Api Pewhairangi*	Centre	New Zealand
Craig Ronaldson	Centre	Ireland
Niyi Adeolokun*	Wing	Nigeria
Fionn Carr	Wing	Ireland
Matt Healy	Wing	Ireland
Danie Poolman*	Wing	South Africa
Darragh Leader	Fullback	Ireland
Tiernan O'Halloran	Fullback	Ireland

- Players qualified to play for Ireland on dual nationality or residency grounds*.
- Senior 15's internationally capped players in **bold**.
- Irish Provinces were limited to 4 non-Irish eligible (NIE) players and 1 non-Irish qualified player (NIQ or "Project Player"). Connacht Rugby was exempted from this under a separate development arrangement.

=== Academy squad ===
Note: Flags indicate national union under World Rugby eligibility rules. Players may hold more than one non-World Rugby nationality.

Player	Position	Union
Shane Delahunt	Hooker	Ireland year 2
Jack Dineen	Hooker	Ireland year 2
Pat O'Toole	Hooker	Ireland year 1
Jamie Dever	Prop	Ireland year 3
Conor Kyne	Prop	Ireland year 1
Saba Meunargia	Prop	Ireland year 3
Conán O'Donnell	Prop	Ireland year 1
Jacob Walshe	Prop	Ireland year 3
Seán O'Brien	Lock	Ireland year 3
Cian Romaine	Lock	Ireland year 1
James Connolly	Flanker	Ireland year 3
Marc Kelly	Flanker	Ireland year 2
Stephen McVeigh	Flanker	Ireland year 1
Rory Moloney	Flanker	Ireland year 3

Player	Position	Union
Conor Lowndes	Scrum-half	Ireland year 1
Conor McKeon	Fly-half	Ireland year 2
Rory Parata	Centre	Ireland year 3
Peter Robb	Centre	Ireland year 2
Ciaran Gaffney	Wing	Ireland year 2
Ed O'Keefe	Wing	Ireland year 1
Cormac Brennan	Fullback	Ireland year 1

== Preseason transfers ==
=== Players in ===
- LK (Ireland) Ultan Dillane promoted from academy
- LK (South Africa) Quinn Roux from (Ireland) Leinster
- LK (Ireland) Ben Marshall from (Ireland) Leinster
- FL (New Zealand) Nepia Fox-Matamua from (New Zealand) Auckland
- FL (Ireland) Eoghan Masterson promoted from academy
- SH (Ireland) Caolin Blade promoted from academy
- SH (Ireland) John Cooney from (Ireland) Leinster
- FH (United States) AJ MacGinty from (United States) Life Running Eagles
- CE Api Pewhairangi from New Zealand Warriors

=== Players out ===
- HK (Ireland) Seán Henry retired
- LK (Ireland) Mick Kearney to (Ireland) Leinster
- LK (England) Michael Swift retired
- FL (Ireland) Willie Faloon to (Ireland) Ulster
- FL (Tonga) Mata Fifita to (Ireland) Galway Tribesmen
- FH (New Zealand) Miah Nikora to (Italy) Petrarca
- FB Shane Layden to Ireland Sevens
- FB (New Zealand) Mils Muliaina to (Italy) Zebre

== Playing kit ==
Connacht's official kit supplier for the season was Australian manufacturer BLK sport, in the third year of a four-year agreement to supply apparel for all of Connacht Rugby's representative teams and support staff in 2013. Connacht's main shirt sponsors were Irish sporting retailer Lifestyle Sports. Lifestyle Sports signed a four-season deal with the province, to see their logo feature on the jersey until the end of the 2017–18 season.

== Results ==
=== Pro12 ===
2015–16 Pro12
	Team	Played	Won	Drawn	Lost	Points For	Points Against	Points Diff	Tries For	Tries Against	Try Bonus	Losing Bonus	Points
1	(Ireland) Leinster (RU)	22	16	0	6	458	290	+168	51	27	6	3	73
2	(Ireland) Connacht (CH)	22	15	0	7	507	406	+101	60	46	8	5	73
3	(Scotland) Glasgow Warriors (SF)	22	14	1	7	557	380	+177	68	37	8	6	72
4	(Ireland) Ulster (SF)	22	14	0	8	488	307	+181	61	29	8	5	69
5	(Wales) Scarlets	22	14	0	8	477	458	+19	45	54	2	5	63
6	(Ireland) Munster	22	13	0	9	459	417	+42	56	36	6	5	63
7	(Wales) Cardiff Blues	22	11	0	11	542	461	+81	62	53	5	7	56
8	(Wales) Ospreys	22	11	1	10	490	455	+35	55	49	6	3	55
9	(Scotland) Edinburgh	22	11	0	11	405	366	+39	41	36	2	8	54
10	(Wales) Newport Gwent Dragons	22	4	0	18	353	492	−139	33	57	0	10	26
11	(Italy) Zebre	22	5	0	17	308	718	−410	35	99	3	1	24
12	(Italy) Benetton Treviso	22	3	0	19	320	614	−294	35	79	0	8	20
If teams are level at any stage, tiebreakers are applied in the following order: 1. number of matches won; 2. the difference between points for and points against; 3. the number of tries scored; 4. the most points scored; 5. the difference between tries for and tries against; 6. the fewest red cards received; 7. the fewest yellow cards received.
Green background (rows 1 to 4) were play-off places, and earned places in the 2016–17 European Rugby Champions Cup. Blue background indicates teams outside the play-off places that earned places in the European Rugby Champions Cup. To facilitate the 2015 Rugby World Cup, there were no play-offs for the 2016–17 European Rugby Champions Cup; the 20th place went to the winner of the 2015–16 European Rugby Challenge Cup if not already qualified. Because Challenge Cup winner Montpellier qualified via the Top 14, its place passed to the top team from that league not already qualified. Plain background indicates teams that earned a place in the 2016–17 European Rugby Challenge Cup.

==== Regular season ====
4 September 2015
19:30

Connacht (Ireland)	29–23	(Wales) Newport Gwent Dragons (1 BP)
Try: Fox-Matamua 25' m Poolman 49' m Carr 77' c Con: Carty (1/3); Pen: Carty (4/4) 7', 8', 21', 68'	Report	Try: Pretorius 41' c J. Thomas 75' c Con: Tovey (2/2); Pen: Tovey (2/2) 28', 56'; Prydie (1/1) 80'

Galway Sportsgrounds
Attendance: 3,624
Referee: Ben Whitehouse (WRU)

11 September 2015
19:35

Glasgow Warriors (Scotland)	33–32	(Ireland) Connacht (2 BP)
Try: G. Bryce 30' c Cummings 35' c Harley 41' c Con: Clegg (3/3); Pen: Clegg (4/4) 10', 22', 27', 68'	Report	Try: Jo. Cooney 46' c penalty try 56' c Poolman 59' m Fox-Matamua 75' c Con: Carty (3/4); Pen: Carty (2/2) 7', 39'

Scotstoun Stadium
Attendance: 6,267
Referee: Ian Davies (WRU)

3 October 2015
17:00

(1 BP) Connacht (Ireland)	36–31	(Wales) Cardiff Blues (2 BP)
Try: Marmion 10' c Fox-Matamua 22' c Poolman 26' m O'Halloran 57' c Muldowney 64' c Con: Carty (4/5); Pen: Carty (1/2) 79'	Report	Try: Summerhill 7' c Turnbull 33' c Fish 48' c Hobbs 80' c Con: Patchell (3/3); G. Davies (1/1); Pen: Patchell (1/2) 40'

Galway Sportsgrounds
Attendance: 3,274
Referee: Neil Hennessy (WRU)

16 October 2015
19:30

(1 BP) Connacht (Ireland)	34–15	(Italy) Zebre
Try: Healy 7' c Marmion 21' c E. McKeon 27' m Ronaldson 39' c Buckley 48' m Con: Ronaldson (3/5); Pen: Ronaldson (1/1) 3'	Report	Try: Berryman 35' c Meyer 78' m Con: Padovani (1/1); Pen: Padovani (1/1) 10'

Galway Sportsgrounds
Attendance: 3,994
Referee: Ben Whitehouse (WRU)

24 October 2015
13:30

(1 BP) Ospreys (Wales)	16–21	(Ireland) Connacht
Try: Baker 14' m Tipuric 68' m Pen: S. Davies (2/5) 2', 56'	Report	Try: Healy 27' m Aki 43' c Con: Ronaldson (1/1); Pen: Carty (2/4) 10', 19'; Ronaldson (1/1) 77'

Liberty Stadium
Attendance: 7,893
Referee: Andrew Brace (IRFU)

31 October 2015
18:45

Connacht (Ireland)	14–9	(Scotland) Edinburgh (1 BP)
Try: O'Halloran 9' m Pen: Carty (3/5) 7', 44', 55'	Report	Pen: Hidalgo-Clyne (2/2) 15', 53'; Kinghorn (1/1) 37'

Galway Sportsgrounds
Attendance: 3,834
Referee: Leighton Hodges (WRU)

6 November 2015
19:30

Connacht (Ireland)	33–19	(Italy) Benetton Treviso
Try: Henshaw 42' c McCartney 52' c Healy 75' c Con: Ronaldson (3/3); Pen: Ronaldson (4/5) 3', 20', 36', 72'	Report	Try: Hayward (2) 26' m, 47' c Gori 80' c Con: Hayward (2/3)

Galway Sportsgrounds
Attendance: 3,443
Referee: Ian Davies (WRU)

28 November 2015
17:15

(1 BP) Munster (Ireland)	12–18	(Ireland) Connacht
Try: N. Scannell 20' m penalty try 65' c Con: Keatley (1/2)	Report	Try: O'Halloran 17' c Aki 77' m Con: Ronaldson (1/2); Pen: Ronaldson (2/3) 11', 58'

Thomond Park
Attendance: 15,143
Referee: Ben Whitehouse (WRU)

4 December 2015
19:05

Cardiff Blues (Wales)	20–16	(Ireland) Connacht (1 BP)
Try: Vosawai 5' c James 54' c Con: Patchell (2/2); Pen: Patchell (2/3) 25', 63'	Report	Try: Porter 12' m E. McKeon 21' m Pen: Porter (1/1) 26'; Carty (1/1) 66'

Cardiff Arms Park
Attendance: 5,824
Referee: Andrew Brace (IRFU)

26 December 2015
18:00

(1 BP) Connacht (Ireland)	3–10	(Ireland) Ulster
Pen: MacGinty (1/1) 63'	Report	Try: Williams 76' c Con: Pad. Jackson (1/1); Pen: Pad. Jackson (1/1) 32'

Galway Sportsgrounds
Attendance: 5,876
Referee: Peter Fitzgibbon (IRFU)

1 January 2016
17:00

Leinster (Ireland)	13–0	(Ireland) Connacht
Try: Van der Flier 60' c Con: Sexton (1/1); Pen: Sexton (1/1) 14'; Madigan (1/1) 74'	Report

RDS Arena
Attendance: 14,297
Referee: George Clancy (IRFU)

10 January 2016
14:30

Scarlets (Wales)	21–19	(Ireland) Connacht (1 BP)
Try: S. Evans 45' c Collins 60' m Con: Thomas (1/2); Pen: Thomas (2/2) 36', 43'; S. Shingler (1/1) 78'	Report	Try: Healy 25' c Con: Ronaldson (1/1); Pen: Ronaldson (2/2) 23', 48'; Carty (2/2) 67', 77'

Parc y Scarlets
Attendance: 5,888
Referee: Marius Mitrea (FIR)

30 January 2016
15:00

(1 BP) Connacht (Ireland)	30–17	(Wales) Scarlets
Try: Heenan (2) 21' m, 36' m Buckley 51' c Ah You 63' c Con: Carty (2/4); Pen: Carty (2/3) 8', 47'	Report	Try: Van der Merwe 44' c G. Owen 73' c Con: Thomas (2/2); Pen: Thomas (1/1) 43'

Galway Sportsgrounds
Attendance: 5,292
Referee: Ben Whitehouse (WRU)

11 February 2016
19:30

(1 BP) Newport Gwent Dragons (Wales)	21–26	(Ireland) Connacht (1 BP)
Try: Hughes 15' m Hewitt 26' c Con: O'Brien (1/1); Pen: Tovey (1/1) 9'; O'Brien (2/2) 44', 56'	Report	Try: Healy 13' c O'Halloran 21' c Masterson 65' m Aki 68' c Con: Ronaldson (3/4)

Rodney Parade
Attendance: 4,128
Referee: David Wilkinson (IRFU)

20 February 2016
17:30

(1 BP) Zebre (Italy)	34–51	(Ireland) Connacht (1 BP)
Try: Meyer 37' c Haimona 45' c Van Schalkwyk 53' c Ruzza 69' c Con: Haimona (4/4); Pen: Haimona (2/2) 13', 19'	Report	Try: Healy (3) 16' c, 43' c, 47' c Marmion 21' c Adeolokun (2) 57' c, 66' c Con: Ronaldson (3/3); MacGinty (3/3); Pen: Ronaldson (1/2) 4'; MacGinty (2/2) 64', 72'

Stadio Sergio Lanfranchi
Attendance: 1,850
Referee: Gary Conway (IRFU)

27 February 2016
19:35

Connacht (Ireland)	30–22	(Wales) Ospreys
Try: Aki 1' c MacGinty 11' c Healy 51' c Con: Ronaldson (3/3); Pen: Ronaldson (3/4) 28', 58', 67'	Report	Try: John 13' m Baker 25' c Webb 55' c Con: S. Davies (2/3); Pen: S. Davies (1/1) 4'

Galway Sportsgrounds
Attendance: 5,279
Referee: George Clancy (IRFU)

4 March 2016
19:35

(1 BP) Edinburgh (Scotland)	23–28	(Ireland) Connacht (1 BP)
Try: Dean 43' m Hoyland 51' c Du Preez 59' m Con: Hidalgo-Clyne (1/3); Pen: Hidalgo-Clyne (2/3) 68', 80'	Report	Try: MacGinty 20' c Heenan 32' c Aki 45' c E. McKeon 72' c Con: Ronaldson (3/3); MacGinty (1/1)

Murrayfield Stadium
Attendance: 3,584
Referee: Ben Whitehouse (WRU)

26 March 2016
17:15

Connacht (Ireland)	7–6	(Ireland) Leinster (1 BP)
Try: Marmion 13' c Con: MacGinty (1/1)	Report	Pen: Madigan (2/2) 41', 62'

Galway Sportsgrounds
Attendance: 7,300
Referee: Nigel Owens (WRU)

1 April 2016
19:35

Ulster (Ireland)	18–10	(Ireland) Connacht
Try: R. Best 27' m Gilroy 43' c Con: Pad. Jackson (1/2); Pen: Pad. Jackson (2/2) 5', 12'	Report	Try: Blade 54' c Con: O'Leary (1/1); Pen: O'Leary (1/2) 40'

Kingspan Stadium
Attendance: 16,224
Referee: Dudley Phillips (IRFU)

16 April 2016
19:15

(1 BP) Connacht (Ireland)	35–14	(Ireland) Munster
Try: Adeolokun (2) 36' c, 54' m penalty try 40' c Bealham 65' c Con: O'Leary (3/4); Pen: O'Leary (3/3) 8', 18', 80'	Report	Try: Zebo 10' c Sherry 23' c Con: J. Holland (2/2)

Galway Sportsgrounds
Attendance: 7,786
Referee: Ben Whitehouse (WRU)

29 April 2016
19:30

Benetton Treviso (Italy)	22–21	(Ireland) Connacht (1 BP)
Try: Morisi 19' m Steyn 22' c penalty try 45' c Con: Hayward (2/3); Pen: Hayward (1/1) 80'	Report	Try: Parata 11' c Carr 14' c Robb 52' c Con: Jo. Cooney (3/3)

Stadio Comunale di Monigo
Attendance: 3,700
Referee: Peter Fitzgibbon (IRFU)

7 May 2016
15:00

Connacht (Ireland)	14–7	(Scotland) Glasgow Warriors (1 BP)
Try: Aki 18' c O'Halloran 59' c Con: MacGinty (1/1); O'Leary (1/1)	Report	Try: Reid 46' c Con: Russell (1/1)

Galway Sportsgrounds
Attendance: 7,786
Referee: Ian Davies (WRU)

==== Play-offs ====
21 May 2016
18:30

Connacht (Ireland)	16–11	(Scotland) Glasgow Warriors
Try: Adeolokun 36' c Con: MacGinty (1/1); Pen: MacGinty (3/3) 24', 52', 64'	Report	Try: Nakarawa 48' m Pen: Weir (2/2) 26', 56'

Galway Sportsgrounds
Attendance: 7,800
Referee: Marius Mitrea (FIR)

28 May 2016
17:30

Connacht (Ireland)	20–10	(Ireland) Leinster
Try: O'Halloran 12' c Adeolokun 21' m Healy 56' m Con: MacGinty (1/3); Pen: MacGinty (1/2) 27'	Report	Try: Cronin 66' c Con: Sexton (1/1); Pen: Sexton (1/1) 43'

Murrayfield Stadium
Attendance: 34,550
Referee: Nigel Owens (WRU)

Connacht	Leinster

FB	15	(Ireland) Tiernan O'Halloran	(substituted off) 68'	(substituted on) 71'
RW	14	(Nigeria) Niyi Adeolokun
OC	13	(Ireland) Robbie Henshaw		(substituted off) 71'
IC	12	(New Zealand) Bundee Aki
LW	11	(Ireland) Matt Healy
FH	10	(United States) AJ MacGinty
SH	9	(Ireland) Kieran Marmion	(substituted off) 60'
N8	8	(Ireland) John Muldoon (c)
OF	7	(New Zealand) Jake Heenan
BF	6	(Ireland) Eoin McKeon	(substituted off) 41'
RL	5	(England) Aly Muldowney
LL	4	(Ireland) Ultan Dillane	(substituted off) 61'
TP	3	(Ireland) Finlay Bealham
HK	2	(New Zealand) Tom McCartney	(substituted off) 71'
LP	1	(Ireland) Ronan Loughney	(substituted off) 68'
Substitutions:
HK	16	(Ireland) Dave Heffernan	(substituted on) 71'
PR	17	(Ireland) JP Cooney
PR	18	(Ireland) Rodney Ah You	(substituted on) 68'
LK	19	(Ireland) Andrew Browne	(substituted on) 61'
FL	20	(Ireland) Seán O'Brien	(substituted on) 41'
SH	21	(Ireland) John Cooney	(substituted on) 60'	(substituted off) 65'
CE	22	(Canada) Shane O'Leary	(substituted on) 68'
CE	23	(Ireland) Peter Robb		(substituted on) 65'
Coach:
(Samoa) Pat Lam

FB	15	(Ireland) Rob Kearney	(substituted off) 60'
RW	14	(Ireland) Dave Kearney	(substituted off) 75'
OC	13	(Ireland) Garry Ringrose
IC	12	(New Zealand) Ben Te'o
LW	11	(Ireland) Luke Fitzgerald
FH	10	(Ireland) Johnny Sexton
SH	9	(Ireland) Eoin Reddan	(substituted off) 57'
N8	8	(Ireland) Jamie Heaslip (c)
OF	7	(Ireland) Jordi Murphy
BF	6	(Ireland) Rhys Ruddock
RL	5	(Ireland) Mick Kearney	(substituted off) 16'
LL	4	(Ireland) Ross Molony	(substituted off) 62'
TP	3	(Ireland) Mike Ross	(substituted off) 41'
HK	2	(Ireland) Richardt Strauss	(substituted off) 41'
LP	1	(Ireland) Jack McGrath	(substituted off) 71'
Substitutions:
HK	16	(Ireland) Seán Cronin	(substituted on) 41'
PR	17	(Ireland) Peter Dooley	(substituted on) 71'
PR	18	(Ireland) Tadhg Furlong	(substituted on) 41'
LK	19	(New Zealand) Hayden Triggs	(substituted on) 16'
N8	20	(Ireland) Jack Conan	(substituted on) 62'
SH	21	(Ireland) Luke McGrath	(substituted on) 57'
FH	22	(Ireland) Ian Madigan	(substituted on) 75'
FB	23	(South Africa) Zane Kirchner	(substituted on) 60'
Coach:
(Ireland) Leo Cullen

Man of the Match:
John Muldoon (Connacht)

Touch judges:
Ian Davies (WRU)
Ben Whitehouse (WRU)
Television Match Official:
Jon Mason (WRU)

=== Rugby Challenge Cup ===
==== Pool 1 ====
Pos	Team	Pld	W	D	L	PF	PA	PD	TF	TA	TB	LB	Pts
1	(Ireland) Connacht (5)	6	4	0	2	147	96	+51	20	12	2	1	19
2	(England) Newcastle Falcons	6	3	0	3	137	97	+40	20	9	3	1	16
3	(France) Brive	6	3	0	3	114	88	+26	12	11	1	3	16
4	(Russia) Enisey-STM	6	2	0	4	63	180	−117	8	28	0	0	8

Source: espn.co.uk

14 November 2015
15:00

Enisey-STM (Russia)	14–31	(Ireland) Connacht (1 BP)
Try: Polivalov (2) 72' c, 80' c Con: Kushnarev (2/2) 73', 80'	Report	Try: Adeolokun 49' m Muldoon 51' m Leader 62' m Parata 76' c Con: Leader (1/1) 76'; Pen: MacGinty (3/4) 7', 36', 43'

Central Stadium, Krasnoyarsk
Attendance: 2,500
Referee: Thomas Charabas (FFR)

21 November 2015
17:00

Connacht (Ireland)	21–17	(France) Brive (1 BP)
Try: Parata 35' m Marshall 45' m Marmion 50' m Pen: Carty (2/2) 33', 40'	Report	Try: Acquier 28' m Masilevu 47' m Galala 73' c Con: Iribaren (1/1) 74'; Pen: Sola (0/2)

Galway Sportsgrounds
Attendance: 4,357
Referee: Craig Maxwell-Keys (RFU)

11 December 2015
19:45

Connacht (Ireland)	25–10	(England) Newcastle Falcons
Try: Poolman 74' c Con: Carty (1/1) 76'; Pen: Carty (6/7) 6', 16', 38', 47', 52', 69'	Report	Try: Mayhew 56' c Con: Willis (1/1) 57'; Pen: Willis (1/2) 33'

Galway Sportsgrounds
Attendance: 4,346
Referee: Thomas Charabas (FFR)

20 December 2015
15:00

(1 BP) Newcastle Falcons (England)	29–5	(Ireland) Connacht
Try: Watson (2) 24' m, 57' m Penalty try (2) 41' c, 56' c Agulla 46' c Con: Willis (2/5) 42', 56'	Report	Try: Poolman 33' m

Kingston Park
Attendance: 4,067
Referee: Ben Whitehouse (WRU)

16 January 2016
20:45

Brive (France)	21–18	(Ireland) Connacht (1 BP)
Pen: Laranjeira (7/8) 6', 17', 26', 47', 58', 62', 80'	Report	Try: Parata 1' m Muldoon (2) 53' m, 78' m Pen: MacGinty (1/2) 42'

Stade Amédée-Domenech
Attendance: 3,000
Referee: Craig Maxwell-Keys (RFU)

23 January 2016
15:00

(1 BP) Connacht (Ireland)	47–5	(Russia) Enisey-STM
Try: O'Halloran 16' m Healy (2) 20' c, 60' m Buckley 27' m Poolman 38' m Henshaw 41' m McCartney 52' m Blade 79' c Con: MacGinty (1/5) 21'; Carty (1/3) 79'; Pen: MacGinty (1/1) 11'	Report	Try: Orlov 46' m

Galway Sportsgrounds
Attendance: 4,261
Referee: Tom Foley (RFU)

Pool winners and runners-up rankings

Rank	Pool Winners	Pts	TF	+/−
1	(England) Harlequins	25	31	+102
2	(England) Gloucester	25	16	+65
3	(England) Sale Sharks	23	20	+76
4	(France) Grenoble	22	22	+33
5	(Ireland) Connacht	19	20	+51
Rank	Pool Runners–up	Pts	TF	+/−
6	(France) Montpellier	20	28	+105
7	(Wales) Newport Gwent Dragons	20	17	+34
8	(England) London Irish	17	25	+64
9	(England) Newcastle Falcons	16	20	+40
10	(Italy) Zebre	13	11	+22

==== Quarter-finals ====
9 April 2016
21:05

Grenoble (France) (4)	33–32	(5) (Ireland) Connacht
Try: Wiesniewski 32' c Dupont 61' c Diaby 69' c Con: Wiesniewski (3/3) 33', 62', 70'; Pen: Wiesniewski (3/3) 20', 37', 40'; Drop: Wiesniewski (1/1) 75'	Report	Try: Adeolokun (2) 11' c, 28' c Henshaw 22' m Healy 42' c Con: O'Leary (3/4) 12', 29', 43'; Pen: O'Leary (1/1) 53'; Cooney (1/1) 72'

Stade des Alpes
Attendance: 14,077
Referee: Matthew Carley (RFU)
