= 2016 Pro12 Grand Final =

Rugby union match

- Event: 2015–16 Pro12
| Connacht | Leinster |
| (Ireland) | (Ireland) |
| 20 | 10 |
- Date: 28 May 2016
- Venue: Murrayfield Stadium, Edinburgh
- Man of the Match: John Muldoon
- Referee: Nigel Owens (WRU)
- Attendance: 34,550
- Weather: Sunny

The 2016 Pro12 Grand Final was the final match of the 2015–16 Pro12 season. The 2015–16 season was the second with Guinness as the title sponsor and the seventh ever League Grand Final. The final was played between Leinster and Connacht.

Connacht claimed their first title, winning on a 20–10 scoreline.

== Route to the final ==
=== 2016 Playoffs ===
The semi-finals followed a 1 v 4, 2 v 3 system with the games being played at the home ground of the higher placed teams.

20 May 2016
19:45

| Leinster (Ireland) | 30–18 | (Ireland) Ulster |
| Try: Nacewa 4' c Heaslip 47' c Cronin 64' c Con: Sexton (3/3); Pen: Sexton (3/3) 10', 15', 56' | Report | Try: Gilroy (2) 38' m, 69' c Con: Pad. Jackson (1/2); Pen: Pad. Jackson (2/2) 26', 31' |

RDS Arena
Attendance: 19,100
Referee: Ian Davies (WRU)

21 May 2016
18:30

| Connacht (Ireland) | 16–11 | (Scotland) Glasgow Warriors |
| Try: Adeolokun 36' c Con: MacGinty (1/1); Pen: MacGinty (3/3) 24', 52', 64' | Report | Try: Nakarawa 48' m Pen: Weir (2/2) 26', 56' |

Galway Sportsgrounds
Attendance: 7,800
Referee: Marius Mitrea (FIR)

== Build-Up ==
It was announced on 8 September 2015 that the seventh Pro12 Grand Final was awarded to Murrayfield Stadium, the headquarters of the Scottish Rugby Union in Edinburgh on 8 September 2015 with the final to be played 28 May 2016. This is only the second time that the Pro12 Grand Final had been awarded to a host city after the success of Belfast in hosting the 2015 final.

Connacht, who made the play-offs for the first ever time, were appearing in their first ever Pro12 final, while Leinster were making their sixth appearance in the final. Leinster were favorites to win the game, priced at 4/9 with Paddy Power Bookmakers, while Connacht were priced at 13/8.

The match was shown live on Sky Sports in Ireland and the UK, and on TG4 in Ireland.

== Match ==
=== Team selection ===
Connacht named an unchanged team from their semi-final win over the Glasgow Warriors. They were forced to plan without injured loosehead prop Denis Buckley, part of the league's Dream Team for consecutive seasons, with veteran Ronan Loughney continuing to deputise in his place. At tighthead prop, Ireland international Nathan White remained absent due to a concussion sustained against Leinster in the league meeting between the sides in the regular season. His Ireland teammate Finlay Bealham started in the number 3 jersey. The team also had to deal with the continued absence of Jack Carty, their top points scorer for the season, as he struggled to return to full fitness following a freak water slide injury in Dubai. United States international AJ MacGinty started at fly-half, with Canada under-age player Shane O'Leary covering from the bench.

Leinster were without their captain Isa Nacewa, who suffered an arm injury in the semi-final against Ulster. Rob Kearney returned from an ankle injury to start in his place at fullback, while the captaincy was taken on by Jamie Heaslip. Their other change to the starting lineup from the semi-final saw Ross Molony come into the second row. He replaced Devin Toner, who was a late withdrawal from the squad following the death of his father. Among the team's longer term absentees was Seán O'Brien, who picked up a hamstring injury in Ireland's Six Nations clash with France that February. Having struggled for fitness over the course of the year and slipped behind Jack McGrath in Leinster's pecking order, Cian Healy was ruled out for the remainder of the season in May.

=== Summary ===
Connacht full-back Tiernan O'Halloran got the opening try in the 13th minute, running it over in the left corner after Matt Healy had broken through the defence. AJ MacGinty converted to put Connacht in a 7–0 lead. Leinster were forced into an early change shortly after, when second row Mick Kearney was removed from play with a head injury, to be replaced by Hayden Triggs. Winger Niyi Adeolokun scored Connacht's second try midway through the half after his own high kick and chase to go over in the right corner, giving Connacht a 12–0 lead. MacGinty kicked a penalty on 27 minutes to give Connacht a 15–0 lead which they took into the interval.

Despite the 15-point deficit, Leinster made no replacements at half-time, while Connacht replaced flanker Eoin McKeon with Seán O'Brien. Johnny Sexton opened the scoring for Leinster with a penalty on 43 minutes. MacGinty had an opportunity to respond with his own penalty minutes later, but dropped his effort short. He made amends shortly after however, when his kick through the Leinster defence let Matt Healy in for Connacht's third try on 57 minutes, stretching the lead to 20–3. Former Connacht player Seán Cronin gave Leinster their first try of the game after 67 minutes when he scored in the right corner, with Sexton converting. Injuries to Tiernan O'Halloran and replacement scrum-half John Cooney forced Connacht to reshuffle their backline, with Healy moving to scrum-half, but Leinster were unable to capitalise as neither team scored again with the game finishing 20–10. The win was the first major trophy for Connacht in their 131-year history.

=== Details ===
28 May 2016
17:30

| Connacht (Ireland) | 20–10 | (Ireland) Leinster |
| Try: O'Halloran 12' c Adeolokun 21' m Healy 56' m Con: MacGinty (1/3); Pen: MacGinty (1/2) 27' | Report | Try: Cronin 66' c Con: Sexton (1/1); Pen: Sexton (1/1) 43' |

Murrayfield Stadium, Edinburgh
Attendance: 34,550
Referee: Nigel Owens (Wales)

| Connacht | Leinster |

| FB | 15 | (Ireland) Tiernan O'Halloran | (substituted off) 68' | (substituted in) 71' |
| RW | 14 | (Ireland) Niyi Adeolokun |
| OC | 13 | (Ireland) Robbie Henshaw | | (substituted off) 71' |
| IC | 12 | (Ireland) Bundee Aki |
| LW | 11 | (Ireland) Matt Healy |
| FH | 10 | (United States) AJ MacGinty |
| SH | 9 | (Ireland) Kieran Marmion | (substituted off) 60' |
| N8 | 8 | (Ireland) John Muldoon (c) |
| OF | 7 | (New Zealand) Jake Heenan |
| BF | 6 | (Ireland) Eoin McKeon | (substituted off) 41' |
| RL | 5 | (England) Aly Muldowney |
| LL | 4 | (Ireland) Ultan Dillane | (substituted off) 61' |
| TP | 3 | (Ireland) Finlay Bealham |
| HK | 2 | (New Zealand) Tom McCartney | (substituted off) 71' |
| LP | 1 | (Ireland) Ronan Loughney | (substituted off) 68' |
Substitutions:
| HK | 16 | (Ireland) Dave Heffernan | (substituted in) 71' |
| PR | 17 | (Ireland) JP Cooney |
| PR | 18 | (Ireland) Rodney Ah You | (substituted in) 68' |
| LK | 19 | (Ireland) Andrew Browne | (substituted in) 61' |
| FL | 20 | (Ireland) Seán O'Brien | (substituted in) 41' |
| SH | 21 | (Ireland) John Cooney | (substituted in) 60' | (substituted off) 65' |
| CE | 22 | (Canada) Shane O'Leary | (substituted in) 68' |
| CE | 23 | (Ireland) Peter Robb | | (substituted in) 65' |
Coach:
(Samoa) Pat Lam

| FB | 15 | (Ireland) Rob Kearney | (substituted off) 60' |
| RW | 14 | (Ireland) Dave Kearney | (substituted off) 75' |
| OC | 13 | (Ireland) Garry Ringrose |
| IC | 12 | (England) Ben Te'o |
| LW | 11 | (Ireland) Luke Fitzgerald |
| FH | 10 | (Ireland) Johnny Sexton |
| SH | 9 | (Ireland) Eoin Reddan | (substituted off) 57' |
| N8 | 8 | (Ireland) Jamie Heaslip (c) |
| OF | 7 | (Ireland) Jordi Murphy |
| BF | 6 | (Ireland) Rhys Ruddock |
| RL | 5 | (Ireland) Mick Kearney | (substituted off) 16' |
| LL | 4 | (Ireland) Ross Molony | (substituted off) 62' |
| TP | 3 | (Ireland) Mike Ross | (substituted off) 41' |
| HK | 2 | (Ireland) Richardt Strauss | (substituted off) 41' |
| LP | 1 | (Ireland) Jack McGrath | (substituted off) 71' |
Substitutions:
| HK | 16 | (Ireland) Seán Cronin | (substituted in) 41' |
| PR | 17 | (Ireland) Peter Dooley | (substituted in) 71' |
| PR | 18 | (Ireland) Tadhg Furlong | (substituted in) 41' |
| LK | 19 | (New Zealand) Hayden Triggs | (substituted in) 16' |
| N8 | 20 | (Ireland) Jack Conan | (substituted in) 62' |
| SH | 21 | (Ireland) Luke McGrath | (substituted in) 57' |
| FH | 22 | (Ireland) Ian Madigan | (substituted in) 75' |
| FB | 23 | (South Africa) Zane Kirchner | (substituted in) 60' |
Coach:
(Ireland) Leo Cullen

Man of the Match:
(Ireland) John Muldoon

Touch judges:
Ian Davies (Wales)
Ben Whitehouse (Wales)
Television Match Official:
Jon Mason (Wales)

== Post-match ==
The victorious Connacht Rugby squad were welcomed back to Galway city on 29 May and paraded around the city on an open-topped bus, from outside the Town Hall Theatre in Courthouse Square to Eyre Square and finally to the Sportsground.
