= Nepia =

Nepia is a New Zealand Māori name that may refer to the following notable people:

- Nepia Fox-Matamua (born 1991), New Zealand rugby union player
- George Nēpia (1905–1986), New Zealand rugby union and rugby league player, great-grandfather of Nepia Fox-Matamua
