= Robbie Henshaw =

Irish rugby union player

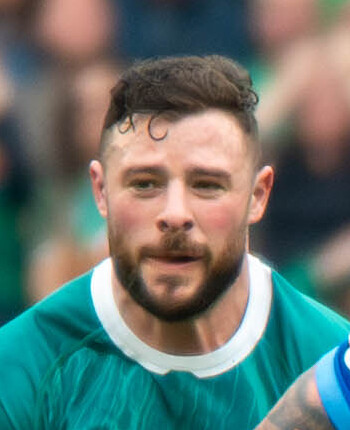
- Henshaw representing Ireland against Italy during the 2025 Six Nations
- Full name: Robert Anthony Henshaw
- Born: 12 June 1993 (age 33) Athlone, Ireland
- Height: 1.91 m (6 ft 3 in)
- Weight: 99 kg (218 lb; 15 st 8 lb)
- School: Marist College
- University: NUI Galway; University College Dublin

Rugby union career
- Position: Centre
- Current team: Leinster
Senior career
Years	Team	Apps	(Points)
2012–2016	Connacht	77	(55)
2016–	Leinster	122	(120)
- Correct as of 14 November 2026
International career
Years	Team	Apps	(Points)
2011	Ireland Schoolboys	3	(0)
2013	Ireland U20	1	(0)
2013	Ireland Wolfhounds	2	(0)
2013–	Ireland	87	(60)
2017–2021	British & Irish Lions	4	(5)
- Correct as of 21 November 2026

Robert Anthony Henshaw (born 12 June 1993) is an Irish professional rugby union player who plays as a centre for United Rugby Championship club Leinster and the Ireland national team. He previously played for Connacht until 2016.

== Early life ==
Born in Athlone, Henshaw grew up in the suburb Coosan, and was a student at Marist College in the town. In 2011, he was part of the Buccaneers Under 19 team that won Connacht League and Cup and the All Ireland League. He was captain of the school's rugby team in 2012 when they won their first Connacht Senior Schools Cup in 35 years. In addition to rugby Henshaw also played Gaelic football in his youth. He played for the Athlone senior team at just 18 years old, and played for the Westmeath minor team in 2010 and 2011.

Henshaw comes from a sporting family with a history of involvement in the GAA, while his uncle David Henshaw played rugby for Buccaneers and Connacht. The family also has a lot of musical talent, with Henshaw himself playing the accordion, fiddle, guitar and piano. His musical and sporting versatility have earned him the nickname "One Man Band" and "Old Man Bob Henshaw" amongst his teammates.

== Club career ==
=== Connacht ===
Henshaw was part of the under-age set up with Connacht, and was part of the Connacht team that completed a Grand Slam in the Under-20 Interprovincial Championship in 2011. He entered the Connacht academy ahead of the 2012–13 season.

Henshaw was given his first cap for Connacht's senior team by Eric Elwood on 1 September 2012. He replaced Eoin Griffin at outside centre against Cardiff Blues in the opening game of the 2012–13 Pro12. Henshaw made a total of 17 appearances in the competition, with all but three of these coming as starts, and scored his first try for the side on 12 April 2013 against Edinburgh. He predominantly played as a fullback over the course of the season. Henshaw made his European debut for the province in Connacht's opening pool fixture of the 2012–13 Heineken Cup against Zebre on 13 October 2012, and went on to start in all of Connacht's Heineken Cup matches that season. In December 2012, Henshaw signed his first senior contract with the province, a two-year deal keep him with the province until the end of the 2014–15 season.

Ahead of the 2013–14 season Eric Elwood left the province and was replaced with Pat Lam. Despite the change of coach, Henshaw continued to play regularly for Connacht, being used both at fullback and centre. He played 18 times in the 2013–14 Pro12, starting all but one of these games and scoring three tries. Henshaw also started all six of Connacht's games in the 2013–14 Heineken Cup, including a victory over Toulouse in France. Henshaw signed a contract extension with Connacht in November 2013, extending his time with the province to summer 2016.

In the 2014–15 season, Henshaw spent more time with the Irish team so did not feature as much for Connacht. He played 12 times in the league, starting each time, and scoring a try against the Cardiff Blues. In Europe, Connacht took part in the 2014–15 Challenge Cup, the second-tier competition. Henshaw started four of the team's six pool stage matches, scoring two tries against La Rochelle, and the quarter-final against Gloucester. He also started in Connacht's final game of the season a play-off for the final spot in the 2015–16 Champions Cup. Connacht again faced Gloucester away, and were leading 18–25 in the final minutes of the game, but a controversial penalty decision from Romain Poite gave Gloucester a try-scoring opportunity and sent the match to extra time, after which Gloucester emerged 40–32 victors, Henshaw having played the full 100 minutes.

Henshaw missed Connacht's opening games of the 2015–16 Pro12 due to the 2015 Rugby World Cup. He returned to the squad in October, but was not available to play until November, when he was named in the side against Benetton Treviso.

On 14 February 2016, it was confirmed by Connacht Rugby that Henshaw would be leaving the province at the end of the 2015–16 season. He decided to join Leinster Rugby after the 2015–16 season

On 28 May 2016, Henshaw was part of the Connacht team that won their first ever major trophy, the 2015–16 Pro12 after a 20–10 win against Leinster in the final.

=== Leinster ===
On 8 October 2016, Henshaw made his debut for Leinster in a 25-14 Pro12 win against Munster at the Aviva Stadium.

== International career ==
=== Ireland U20 ===
Henshaw represented Ireland at various under-age levels during his development. In November 2011, he became the first player from Marist College or any Athlone-based school to represent the Irish schools team, and was part of the team that won the Under-18 European Championships. He also represented the country at under-19 level.

Henshaw was named in Ireland training squad for the 2013 Six Nations Championship, and played 58 minutes at fullback for the Ireland Wolfhounds in a friendly against England Saxons on 25 January 2013. Henshaw was released from the senior squad in February and made his debut for Ireland Under-20 on 8 February 2013, starting at fullback in the side's 16–15 victory against England.

=== Ireland ===
Henshaw was called up to the Ireland squad for the 2013 end-of-year rugby union tests. He came off the bench against Australia on 16 November 2013, firstly as a blood-replacement for Brian O'Driscoll and then as a replacement for Rob Kearney.

Henshaw started for Ireland Wolfhounds in their friendly against England Saxons on 25 January 2014. Henshaw was named in Ireland's 34-man squad for the opening two fixtures of the 2014 Six Nations Championship but did not play in the tournament. He made two appearances in the 2014 end-of-year international wins against South Africa and Australia.

In 2015, Henshaw was included in the Ireland squad for the 2015 Six Nations Championship. On 1 March 2015, Henshaw scored his first try for Ireland in a 19–9 victory over England in Ireland's third game of the 2015 Six Nations.

Henshaw was included in the Irish squad for the 2015 Rugby World Cup. After missing out on a place in the first pool stage games against Romania and Canada, Henshaw resumed his role in the starting team for his World Cup debut against Italy. Henshaw went on to play full games against both France and Argentina, the latter of which saw Ireland reach the end of their World cup journey.

On 5 November 2016, Henshaw scored the winning try against New Zealand in Soldier Field, Chicago. Henshaw received the ball off an attacking five-metre scrum and beat three tacklers to touch down. In March 2023, Henshaw was part of the Ireland team to win the Grand Slam, only the fourth time in history that Ireland had won.

=== British & Irish Lions ===
Henshaw was a member of the 2017 British & Irish Lions tour of New Zealand. Henshaw was sent home early after an injury against the Hurricanes, having started against the Chiefs, Highlanders and Blues through the tour. Henshaw was joined on the ride back home by fellow injured back George North. Henshaw was also named in the squad for the 2021 British & Irish Lions tour to South Africa. Henshaw started at 12 and 13 in all three tests, being one of 9 players to do so.

== Honours ==
Ireland

- 5x Six Nations Championships: 2014, 2015, 2018, 2023, 2024
- 4× Triple Crown: 2018, 2022, 2023, 2025
- 2x Grand Slams: 2018, 2023

Connacht

- 1x Pro 14: 2015/16

Leinster

- 4x Pro 14: 2017/18, 2018/19, 2019/20, 2020/21
- 2× URC: 2025, 2026
- 1x European Champions Cup: 2018
