= Nepia Fox-Matamua =

New Zealand rugby union player

- Born: 5 September 1991 (age 35) Auckland, New Zealand
- Height: 1.85 m (6 ft 1 in)
- Weight: 108 kg (17 st 0 lb)
- School: St Peter's College
- University: University of Auckland
- Notable relative: Taina Fox-Matamua (brother)

Rugby union career
- Position: Flanker
Amateur team(s)
Years	Team	Apps	(Points)
2012	Auckland University		
2013	Marist		
2014	Auckland University		
Provincial / State sides
Years	Team	Apps	(Points)
2012	Auckland	1	(5)
2013	North Harbour	3	(0)
2014	Auckland	1	(0)
2015–2017	Connacht	19	(15)
- Correct as of 3 Nov 2017

Nepia Fox-Matamua (born 5 September 1991) is a rugby union player from Auckland in New Zealand. He plays as a flanker, primarily at openside. Fox-Matamua has played for New Zealand Provincial Championship sides Auckland and North Harbour, and played for Irish provincial team Connacht in the Pro12 from 2015 to 2017.

Fox-Matamua is the great-grandson of famous Māori rugby player George Nēpia. Nepia, who was inducted into the New Zealand Sports Hall of Fame, played both league and union and has been described as "New Zealand rugby's first superstar".

== Early life ==
Born in Auckland, Fox-Matamua attended St Peter's College in the city, playing for the school's first fifteen in his senior years there. He then went on to play for the Auckland University's rugby team. In his youth, Fox-Matamua played Gaelic football with the Marist Rangers club, which is under the Auckland GAA. He played in midfield and at centre forward. He has also played rugby sevens.

== Career ==
=== First stint with Auckland ===
Fox-Matamua joined Auckland during the 2012 ITM Cup, as an injury replacement. He made his debut with a start against Manawatu, and scored a try in 59–16 victory.

=== Season with North Harbour ===
Following his experience playing with Auckland, Fox-Matamua moved to Championship side North Harbour for the 2013 ITM Cup. During his time with North Harbour, he also played with the amateur club Marist. Fox-Matamua made his debut for North Harbour against Wellington on 28 August 2013, and was substituted after 54 minutes in a 35–27 defeat. His next appearance came as a substitute against Otago, replacing Leigh Thompson on 53 minutes. Fox-Matamua made his final appearance for North Harbour in the side's last game of the competition, replacing Viliami Fihaki against Canterbury.

=== Return to Auckland ===
Fox-Matamua returned to Auckland in 2014, in the process rejoining his club University. He made a single appearance for the side in the 2014 ITM Cup, coming on as a substitute for Blake Gibson in the semi-final match against Taranaki. During his second stint with Auckland, Fox-Matamua won the Gallaher Shield with University.

=== Move to Connacht ===
It was announced in March 2015 that Fox-Matamua had signed a two-year contract with Irish provincial team Connacht, having been targeted by Connacht head coach Pat Lam. Lam had previously coached Auckland and the Blues and worked with Fox-Matamua at the former. Already at Connacht before Fox-Matamua were Jake Heenan, previously part of the Auckland academy with him, and Tom McCartney, a former teammate of his on the Auckland senior team and Fox-Matamua consulted with them prior to signing.

Fox-Matamua made his competitive debut for Connacht on 4 September 2015, starting against Newport Gwent Dragons in the 2015–16 Pro12 on the opening day of the season. He played the full 80 minutes and scored a try after a catch and drive from a lineout as Connacht won 29–23. Fox-Matamua started the following week against Glasgow Warriors, again playing the full match and scoring a try as part of a drive by the team.
