= Willie Sexton =

Irish rugby union player

William Sexton
- Full name: William J. Sexton
- Born: 21 July 1959 (age 67)
- Notable relative: Johnny Sexton (nephew)

Rugby union career
- Position: Flanker
International career
| Years | Team | Apps | (Points) |
| 1984–88 | Ireland | 3 | (0) |

William J. Sexton (born 21 July 1959) is an Irish former rugby union international.

Sexton, a native of Listowel, County Kerry, attended Castleknock College in Dublin.

A flanker, Sexton played for Garryowen and Munster. He earned three Ireland caps, debuting against Australia at Lansdowne Road in 1984, with further appearances in 1988 against Scotland and England.

Sexton, uncle of Ireland player Johnny Sexton, formerly owned Sexton's bar on Henry Street in Limerick.

== See also ==
- List of Ireland national rugby union players
