= John Muldoon (rugby union, born 1982) =

Irish rugby union coach and player

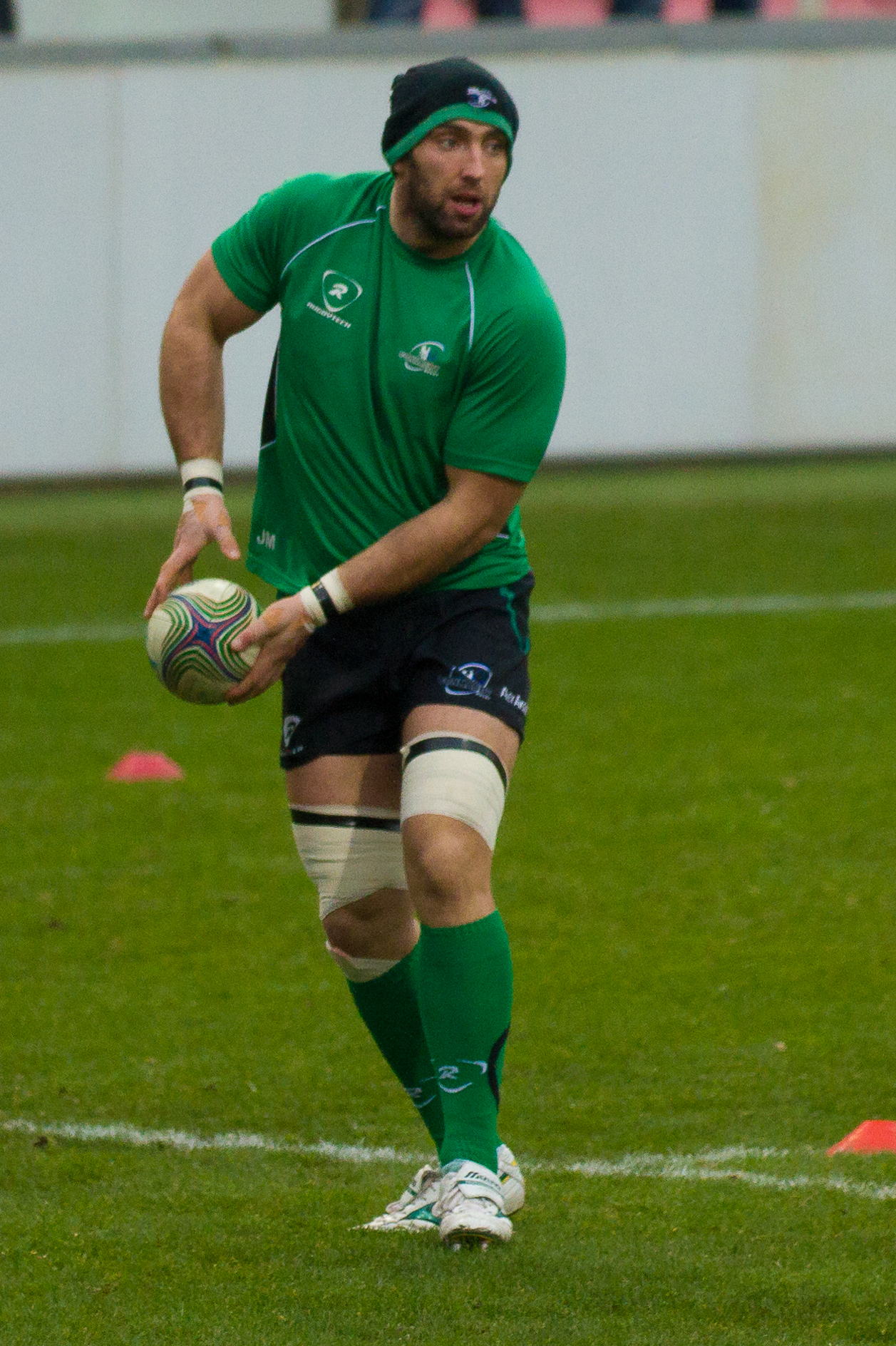
- Muldoon in the warm up for Connacht's 2011–12 Heineken Cup match with Toulouse
- Born: 30 November 1982 (age 43) Portumna, County Galway, Ireland
- Height: 1.92 m (6 ft 3 1/2 in)
- Weight: 110 kg (17 st 5 lb)
- School: Portumna Community School
- University: GMIT; Setanta College

Rugby union career
- Position(s): Number 8, Flanker
- Current team: Connacht
Amateur team(s)
Years	Team	Apps	(Points)
1997–2000	Nenagh Ormond		
2000–2018	Galwegians		
Senior career
Years	Team	Apps	(Points)
2003–2018	Connacht	327	(117)
- Correct as of 28 April 2018
International career
Years	Team	Apps	(Points)
2000–2001	Ireland U19		
2002–2003	Ireland U21		
2006–2012	Ireland Wolfhounds	11	(10)
2009–2010	Ireland	3	(0)
2017	Barbarians	1	(0)
- Correct as of 11 November 2017
Coaching career
- Years: Team
- 2018–2023: Bristol Bears (Forwards Coach)
- 2023-present: Connacht (Lineout & Maul Coach)

John Muldoon (born 30 November 1982) is an Irish rugby union coach and former player. He is currently the Lineout & Maul coach for Connacht.

During his playing career, Muldoon played in the back row, primarily as a number 8 but also at blindside flanker. He spent his entire professional career with Irish provincial team Connacht and represented Ireland at test level. Muldoon holds the record for appearances for Connacht, is also the most-capped player in the Pro14.

Before becoming a professional rugby player, Muldoon played hurling with Portumna. He won an inter-county All-Ireland minor medal in 2000 playing for Galway against Cork.

== Early life ==
Muldoon was born in Portiuncula Hospital in Ballinasloe and grew up in Portumna in east County Galway. He attended Gortanumera National School in Ballyshrule. Muldoon was also a student at Portumna Community School.

Muldoon played hurling in his youth, with the local Portumna GAA club. He represented Galway at under-age inter-county level. In 2000, he was part of the Galway team that won the All-Ireland Minor Hurling Championship, an unused substitute in the final against Cork. Other members of the squad included Damien and Kevin Hayes, Ger Farragher, Shane Kavanagh, Fergal Moore, Richie Murray and Tony Óg Regan, all of whom went on to play in All-Ireland Senior Hurling Finals with Galway. Hurling was Muldoon's primary sport growing up, and he idolised Galway's five-time All Star centre forward Joe Cooney.

Muldoon didn't start playing rugby union until he was 14 years old. He took up the sport with Portumna Community School after his older brother Ivan had played the year before, and went on to captain the school's side in the Connacht Junior Schools Cup. Muldoon played with Nenagh at under-age level as Portumna's rugby club was defunct and not reestablished until 2002. He won an All-Ireland Under-18 Cup with Nenagh in 2000.

== Club career ==
=== Early career ===
Having won an All-Ireland Under-18 Cup with Nenagh Ormond Muldoon moved to Galway city to study, taking an Industrial Engineering course in the Galway-Mayo Institute of Technology. He attempted to join the college rugby club, but there weren't enough members for a team. Muldoon, who was playing for the Irish under-19 side, needed to train and was invited to train with Galwegians. After impressing in the session, Muldoon was invited to join the squad by the club's Director of Rugby John Kingston. Muldoon played for Galwegians in the Connacht Under-20s Cup.

=== Connacht ===
==== Rookie years (2003–2008) ====
Muldoon was noticed by Connacht, who gave him a summer training contract in 2001. He was still on a part-time development contract in 2003 when Connacht was nearly shut down by the IRFU as a budget-cutting measure. With the mass departure of players that followed this, Muldoon was given his first full contract for the following season.

Muldoon first played for Connacht in the 2003–04 Celtic League season. This season also saw his former Ireland under-21 coach Michael Bradley take over as Connacht head coach, joining shortly after Muldoon signed his first contract. Muldoon had an uneasy relationship with Bradley at first, saying, "We had an OK relationship, but not brilliant. I know when he took over I had thought 'oh no'. Later Brads told me I was hitting my ceiling and a year later that I was overachieving." Muldoon made his debut as a replacement in a game against Scottish side Border Reivers. He played in a total of four league games that season, with two of those appearances being starts.

The following season saw Muldoon became a regular figure in the Connacht team. He played 17 times for the side in the 2004–05 Celtic League, starting 11 of these games. He scored his first Connacht try on 4 September 2004 in their league match against Glasgow. During the course of the league season, he also received two yellow cards. Muldoon made his European rugby debut that season in the 2004–05 European Challenge Cup. His first game in the competition was against French side Narbonne. He played in every one of the province's games in the competition with the exception of the second game with Sale Sharks. Muldoon started each of these games and scored tries against Montpellier and Grenoble as Connacht reached the semi-finals.

In the following seasons, Muldoon continued to be a key member of the Connacht side. He played in 19 games for the province in the 2005–06 Celtic League and starting in all seven of the team's games in the 2005–06 Challenge Cup, while in the following season he started 19 games in the league and four of the side's six games in the Challenge Cup. In each of the two seasons, Muldoon was shown a yellow card in two league games. In the 2007–08 season, Muldoon played 17 games in the Celtic League, 15 of them starts and started four games in that season's Challenge Cup.

==== Captaincy (2008–2011) ====
Bradley named Muldoon as Connacht captain ahead of the 2008–09 season, replacing Andrew Farley in the role. He led the team out in a competitive game for the first time against the Ospreys on 5 September 2008, but was yellow carded in the match, as the team lost by 3–16. He played in 15 more league games that year, and was sin binned in two more games as Connacht finished bottom of the Celtic League again. Muldoon's first European game as captain came against French side Dax in the 2008–09 European Challenge Cup, and he scored a try as Connacht won by 30 points to 12 away from home. In Muldoon's first season as captain, the team made it past the group stages, but were beaten in the quarter-finals by Northampton Saints.

In the 2009–10 Celtic League, Muldoon played 14 games for Connacht, starting in each of them as the province finished bottom of the table for a third successive year. Connacht performed far better in Europe however, and topped their pool comfortably, winning all six games with two try bonus points. The team proceeded to the quarter-finals as the competition's top seeds. In the quarters, they faced the French Top 14 side Bourjoin, beating them 23–20 with a late Miah Nikora drop goal. Connacht advanced to the semi-finals where, on 30 April 2010, they faced a Toulon team featuring the English fly-half Jonny Wilkinson. Toulon won 19–12 in Galway, with Wilkinson kicking 14 of the French club's points. Muldoon played in and started all but one of the team's games, not playing in the home match with Olympus Madrid. He scored three tries in the competition, crossing the line against Madrid, Bourjoin and Worcester Warriors.

In the 2010–11 season, Muldoon's former Connacht teammate Eric Elwood took over the side. In the Challenge Cup, the team failed to qualify from their group, finishing second behind eventual champions Harlequins. Muldoon played in four of the team's six European matches. Domestically, Connacht were able to improve their league standing coming ninth from 12 teams, ahead of Glasgow Warriors and two new Italian teams. However Muldoon missed much of the season through injury, playing in only eight games in the 2010–11 Celtic League.

==== Heineken Cup (2011–2014) ====
For the 2011–12 season, Connacht qualified for the Heineken Cup, Europe's premier club rugby competition, for the first ever time, and Muldoon's Galwegians club mate and fellow Ireland cap-holder, Gavin Duffy, was made team captain. The start of the season also saw the Celtic League renamed, becoming the Pro12. In the first Pro12 season, Muldoon played in every one of Connacht's 22 games, starting all but two of them. Muldoon played his first ever Heineken Cup game on 11 November 2011, against Harlequins in the Stoop. He started all six of the team's games including the bonus point defeats to Gloucester and the victory over Harlequins in the return leg in Galway, which was Connacht's first ever Heineken Cup win.

In the 2012–13 season, Muldoon did not play as regularly as the previous season, again due to injury. He featured in only two of Connacht's games in the 2012–13 Heineken Cup, but managed to score his first Heineken Cup try against Zebre on 13 October 2012. In the 2012–13 Pro12, Muldoon played 16 games, starting in nine of them.

Summer 2013 saw Elwood leave his post as head coach, replaced by former Samoa international Pat Lam. Muldoon started out the year sharing the captaincy with both Duffy and Connacht's longest serving player, Michael Swift. After a poor run of form culminating in a 43–10 defeat against Edinburgh, Craig Clarke, former Super Rugby winning-captain with the Chiefs, was made Connacht's team captain with Muldoon and the others continuing to "lead off the field". Muldoon reached the milestone of playing over 200 times for the province in the 2013–14 season, with the landmark appearance coming on 13 September 2013 against the Cardiff Blues in the Pro12. In December 2013, he signed a new contract with Connacht to keep him at the province until 2016.

==== Reinstated as captain (2014–2018) ====
Following the forced retirement of Craig Clarke due to persistent concussions at the end of the 2013–14 season, Muldoon was once again handed the captaincy in August 2014. The following season saw Muldoon start all 22 of Connacht's league games and featured in five of the team's seven games in the 2014–15 Rugby Challenge Cup. Connacht's performance in the league saw them finish an all-time high of seventh, but this was not enough to guarantee a spot in the Champions Cup, and the team was entered into a play-off with teams from England and France. Muldoon captained Connacht in their play-off against Gloucester, playing the entire game. Connacht led 18–25 in the final minutes, but a controversial penalty decision from Romain Poite gave Gloucester a try-scoring opportunity and sent the match to extra time, after which Gloucester emerged 40–32 victors.

With the departure of teammate Michael Swift at the end of the previous season, Muldoon came into 2015–16 season as Connacht's longest-serving and most-capped player. On 11 September 2015, he made his 250th appearance for Connacht in a 2015–16 Pro12 game against Glasgow Warriors. On 28 May 2016 Connacht, captained by Muldoon, won their first ever major trophy, the 2015–16 Pro12 after a 20–10 win against Leinster in the final. Muldoon was named man-of-the-match for his display in the game.

Muldoon continued to be a fixture in the first team throughout the 2016–17 season, appearing in all but one of the first team matches. In January 2017, after contemplating retirement, Muldoon signed a new contract to remain at Connacht for the 2017–18 season, taking him into his 14th season with the side. On 15 April 2017, he made his 300th appearance for Connacht in a game against Leinster in the Pro12.

Pat Lam left Connacht for Bristol in summer 2017, and was replaced by Kieran Keane, who kept Muldoon on in his role as captain. In January 2018, Muldoon announced that he would be retiring at the end of the season. His final game came against Leinster in the Pro14 on 28 April 2018 at the Sportsgrounds. The result was a 47–10 win for Connacht, with Muldoon scoring his last ever points for the province by converting the team's final try of the day.

== International career ==
=== Ireland ===
Muldoon has represented his country on the international stage at various levels. After playing for Portumna Community School and Nenagh Ormond as a teenager, he was selected for the Irish under-19 team. He continued to play for the Irish under-19s after moving to Galway for college and joining Galwegians. Muldoon was also selected for the Ireland under-21 side, which was then coached by Michael Bradley, his future coach at Connacht. With the under-21s, Muldoon played alongside Rory Best, who later captained the Irish senior team and Tommy Bowe, who went on to become the second-highest international try-scorer for Ireland behind Brian O'Driscoll.

Muldoon was selected for the Ireland 'A' team at the end of the 2005–06 season. He made his debut for the second-tier side on 3 June 2006 when he started against the United States in a 2006 Churchill Cup pool game. He also played in the third-place play-off against England Saxons, coming on as a replacement in the last ten minutes. Muldoon was selected again for the 2007 Churchill Cup where he played against Canada and Scotland A.

Muldoon next played for Ireland A on 13 February 2009, playing the full 80 minutes and scoring a try against Scotland A in a friendly that took place during the 2009 Six Nations Championship. Later that season, with 13 players on the Lions tour and Leinster players unavailable after reaching the Heineken Cup final, Muldoon was named in senior Ireland squad for their 2009 tour to North America. He made his full debut for Ireland when he started against Canada on 23 May 2009, playing 71 minutes in a 25–6 victory. He also lined out against the United States the following week, playing an hour in a 27–10 victory. Later that month, Muldoon captained Ireland A in the 2009 Churchill Cup. He featured in the pool stage against Canada and the final against England Saxons, scoring a try in the latter, as Ireland won the tournament.

In the following season, Muldoon continued to play for Ireland A. He started against Argentina A in an end-of-year game on 27 November 2009, which ended in a 31–0 victory for the Irish. On 31 January 2010, he started for the A side, now renamed the Ireland Wolfhounds, against England Saxons in a warm-up game for the 2010 Six Nations, which ended in a 17–13 defeat. At the end of the season, Muldoon was included in the senior squad for the 2010 summer internationals. He started for Ireland in an uncapped match against the Barbarians in Thomond Park on 4 June 2010, which Ireland lost 23–29. On 12 June 2010, Muldoon started for Ireland against New Zealand but was forced from the field with a broken arm 36 minutes into a 66–28 defeat. The injury meant he missed the remainder of the tour. Muldoon didn't play for the Ireland Wolfhounds again until 28 January 2012. He started at blindside flanker against the England Saxons in a 2012 Six Nations warm up game, which the Wolfhounds lost 23–17.

=== Barbarians ===
In 2017, Muldoon was called up by Robbie Deans for the international invitational team the Barbarians, ahead of their game against Tonga in Thomond Park during the November series. Also in the Barbarians team were Muldoon's Connacht teammate Quinn Roux and former Ireland teammate Donncha O'Callaghan. In addition, his former Connacht teammate Frank Murphy refereed the game. Muldoon was a 51st minute replacement for Italy international Simone Favaro in a 27–24 victory for the Baa-Baas.

== Coaching career ==
It was announced in April 2018 that Muldoon would be taking over the role of defence coach, at newly-promoted Premiership outfit Bristol from the 2018–19 season. The move reunited him with his former Connacht coach, Pat Lam, currently Head Coach at the club.
