= Johnny Sexton =

Irish rugby union player (born 1985)

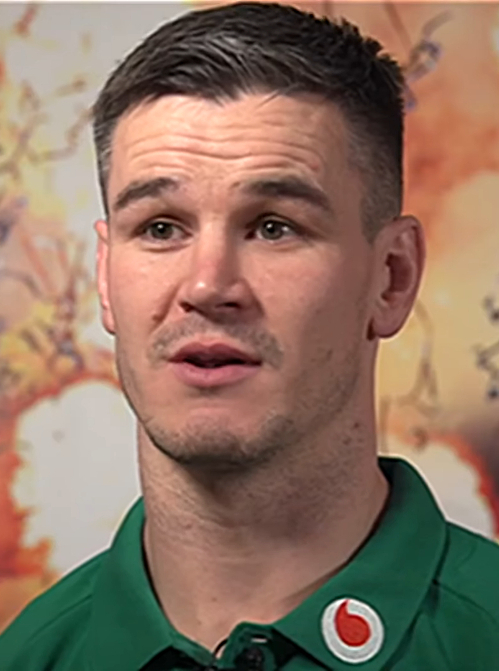
- Sexton during an interview, January 2020
- Full name: Jonathan Jeremiah Sexton
- Born: 11 July 1985 (age 41) Dublin, Ireland
- Height: 1.88 m (6 ft 2 in)
- Weight: 90 kg (198 lb; 14 st 2 lb)
- School: St. Mary's College
- University: University College Dublin
- Notable relative: Jerry Sexton (brother)

Rugby union career
- Position: Fly-half
Senior career
Years	Team	Apps	(Points)
2006–2013	Leinster	110	(1,027)
2013–2015	Racing 92	40	(350)
2015–2023	Leinster	79	(617)
- Correct as of 4 August 2023
International career
Years	Team	Apps	(Points)
2004	Ireland U18	5	
2005–2006	Ireland U21	10	
2007–2009	Ireland A	11	(66)
2009–2023	Ireland	118	(1,108)
2013–2017	British & Irish Lions	6	(5)
- Correct as of 1 July 2025
Coaching career
- Years: Team
- 2024–: Ireland (Consultant)
- 2025: British & Irish Lions (Assistant Coach)

Jonathan Jeremiah Sexton (born 11 July 1985) is an Irish former rugby union player and coach who played as a fly-half and captained the Ireland national team from 2019 until 2023. He also played club rugby for Leinster and French side Racing 92.

He also represented the British & Irish Lions on their 2013 and 2017 tours, and has scored over 1,100 points in his international career, making him one of the highest points-scorers in rugby union history. He has been described by players and coaches as the world's best fly-half during his career and as Ireland's best ever player.

Sexton was the winner of World Rugby Player of the Year in 2018, having previously been a nominee for the award in 2014 and then again in 2022. He was the second Irish player in history to win the award, after the inaugural winner Keith Wood, in 2001.

Sexton became the 106th player to captain Ireland when he led the team out at their 2019 World Cup 3rd Pool A group match at the Kobe Misaki Stadium in Japan on 3 October 2019. He was officially named captain for the 2020 Six Nations, a role he retained through the 2023 World Cup. He is the all-time record points scorer for Ireland.

== Early life ==
Sexton was born in Rathgar, Dublin, but has family ties to North Kerry and West Clare; he is a nephew of former Garryowen, Munster and Ireland rugby player William Sexton. In his formative years, Sexton played mini rugby with Bective Rangers in Donnybrook, Dublin, the club of his father, who is a long-standing member. He attended St Mary's College, Dublin and scored a drop goal in the dying moments of the school's 2002 Leinster Senior Schools Cup final victory. His performances at St. Mary's led to Sexton being selected for Leinster.

== Club career ==
=== Leinster ===
==== 2005–2008 ====
Sexton began his Leinster career playing one game in the 2005–06 season as a result of his performances for St. Mary's. He came on as a substitute against Border Reivers.

Sexton played three games in the 2006–07 season. Although he only played 12 minutes against Ospreys, he scored a conversion. He went on to kick three penalties in his other games, which were against Ulster and Munster. In all, that season he scored 11 points in only 143 minutes of playtime.

In the 2007–08 season, Sexton started against Edinburgh and scored one try, one conversion and two penalties. He scored his second try of the season against Cardiff Blues, in which game he scored a further two conversions and two penalties. He followed that up by scoring a conversion and two penalties against the Scarlets. He ended 2007 scoring a further 23 points against Ulster and Glasgow Warriors. He then finished off the season with 14 points in his games against Munster Rugby and Newport Gwent Dragons. Overall, he scored 73 points during the 2007–08 season.

==== 2008–2010 ====
At the start of the season, Sexton played seven matches against Cardiff, Edinburgh and Munster in September. In October, he played against Connacht, Edinburgh, London Wasps and Glasgow. He finished the season on a high, scoring 64 points after November. He got a call up to the Ireland team for the 2008 Six Nations, but was ruled out by injury.

Sexton was part of Leinster's Celtic League winning side for the 2007–08 season. On 2 May 2009, he established himself in the Leinster first team, replacing the injured Argentine fly-half Felipe Contepomi as an early substitute in the Heineken Cup semi-final to help Leinster beat rivals Munster 25–6. He then started in Leinster's home match against the Scarlets in the Celtic League, scoring 15 points (including a try) in a man of the match performance.

Contepomi's cruciate ligament injury ruled him out for the rest of Leinster's campaign; he signed with French giants Stade Français Paris the following season. Sexton started the 2009 Heineken Cup Final against Leicester Tigers, where he kicked an amazing drop goal from the halfway line and also kicked the winning penalty (a total of 11 points: two penalties, one drop goal and one conversion). Leinster went on to win their first European Cup 16–19 at Murrayfield.

Sexton played league and Heineken cup matches against Scarlets, Dragons, Ospreys, Edinburgh, Munster, London Irish, Brive, Ulster and Cardiff before being called up to the Ireland team for a match against Fiji. He scored 16 points with five conversions and two penalties in a 41–6 victory. He then scored all of Ireland's points through five penalties, leading Ireland to a 15–10 win against South Africa.

Upon recovering from a hand injury sustained during the Ireland–South Africa autumn international fixture in 2009, Sexton helped Leinster to secure a bonus point win over Brive in the Heineken Cup to take command of their pool. The following week in their pool decider, Sexton scored a drop goal in the dying minutes against London Irish at Twickenham to even up the score at eleven all. This secured Leinster a home advantage in the Heineken Cup quarter finals and knocked the Exiles out of the competition. In 2010, Sexton played six games for Ireland, scoring 37 points in matches against England, Wales, Scotland, New Zealand and Australia.

Sexton's ability was highlighted on his return from injury in the 2010–11 season, where he helped Leinster recover from a shaky start to the season as a second-half substitute in their win over Munster in the Celtic League. Following this victory, he helped Leinster win over Racing Metro and Saracens in the Heineken Cup. In the second match, he received a man of the match award after scoring 25 points, including a try, giving his team the top spot in a pool regarded as one of the most competitive in Heineken Cup history. A poll taken by planetrugby.com following these performances suggested that Sexton was then regarded as the top fly-half in Europe.

==== 2010–2011 ====
Sexton played 19 times for Leinster that season, scoring 237 points. He scored two tries as Leinster won the Heineken Cup after trailing 22–6 at half-time to win the match 33–22. Leinster then had the chance to add a second trophy by winning the Pro12. However, Munster beat them 19–9 in the final, with Sexton kicking three penalties.

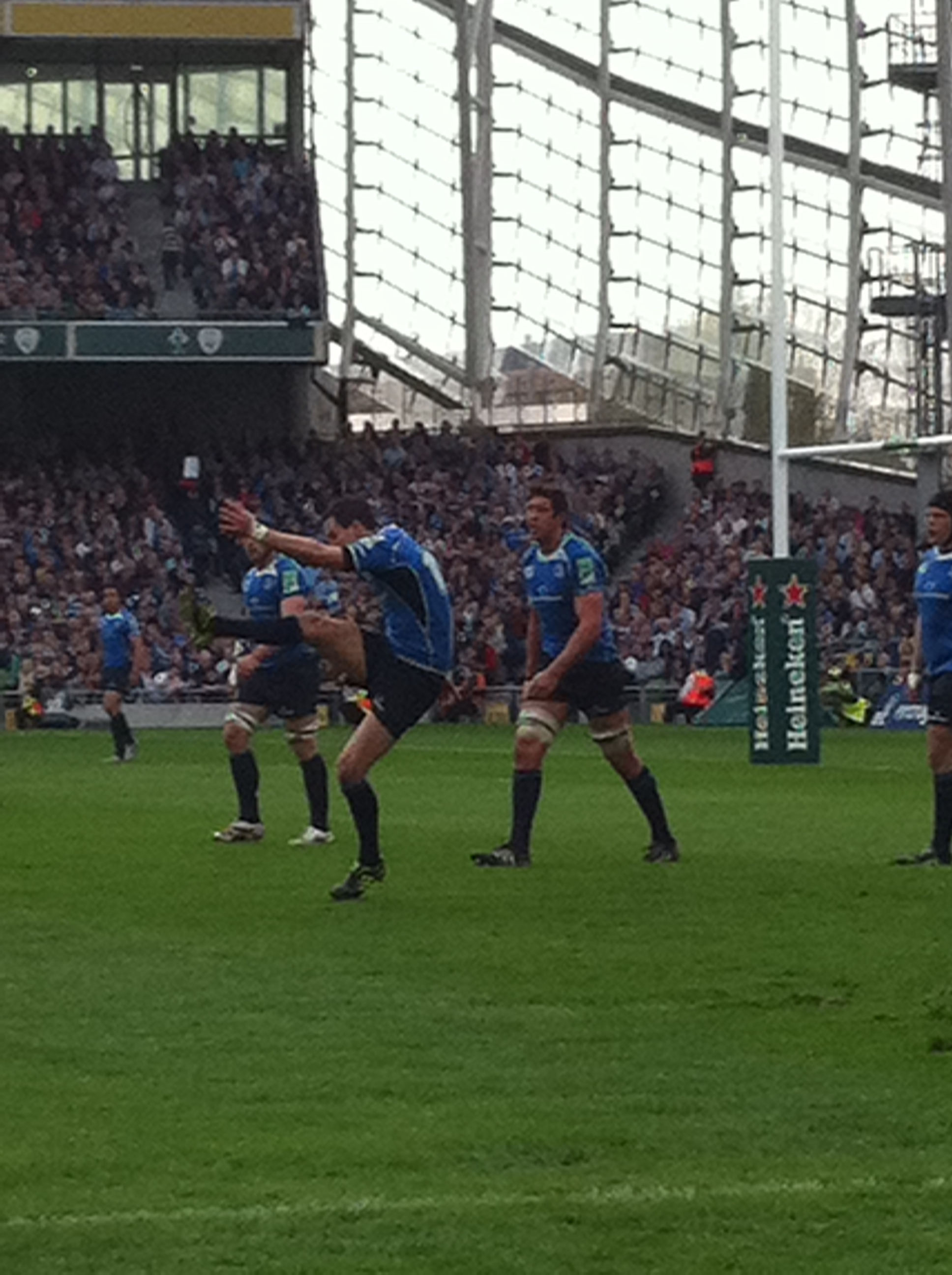
Sexton in action during the 2011 Heineken Cup quarter-final versus the Leicester Tigers.

During Leinster's 2011 Heineken Cup final against the Northampton Saints, Sexton scored 28 points including 2 tries in a historic comeback, when Leinster beat Northampton 33–22 at the Millennium Stadium after falling 22–6 down at half-time. Sexton won the man of the match award and his second Heineken Cup medal. His 28 points in that match makes him the second-highest scorer in one game in Heineken Cup history. Sexton stated that his career-defining performance was dedicated to his late grandfather, John Sexton – the hugely popular Listowel businessman who had died a few months earlier. However, Sexton and Leinster could not snatch the first Heineken Cup and Celtic League double that season, with the club losing to Munster in the 2011 Celtic League Final.

==== 2011–2012 ====
Sexton played 16 games for Leinster in 2011–12, scoring a try, 29 conversions, three drop goals and four penalties. He totalled 213 points overall. He won the Heineken Cup with Leinster that year and came runner up in the RaboDirect Pro 12, losing to Ospreys in the final. He started in all five matches in the Six Nations.

In May 2012, Irish heavyweights Leinster and Sexton achieved their third Heineken Cup triumph in four seasons against Irish rivals Ulster as they established themselves as giants of the European game. First-half tries by flanker Seán O'Brien and prop Cian Healy put Leinster on the way towards a record-breaking triumph. Leinster's reign as Heineken Cup holders was never seriously threatened in front of almost 82,000 spectators at Twickenham. Jonathan Sexton kicked three conversions and three penalties for a 15-point haul as Leinster became the first team since Leicester Tigers in 2002 to successfully defend the Heineken Cup. When replacement prop Heinke van der Merwe and Seán Cronin scored near full-time, it gave Leinster the biggest ever winning margin in a Heineken Cup final, Leinster 42–14 Ulster.

==== 2012–2013 ====
The 2012–13 season proved successful for Sexton as he helped Leinster win their first Pro 12 title since the Celtic League, having been runners up the previous three seasons. Despite the disappointment of failing to gain access to the knockout stages of the Heineken Cup that year, Sexton helped Leinster win their first Amlin Challenge Cup, a third European title in three years. He spent a portion of the season sidelined due to injury, allowing his understudy Ian Madigan to play at outside half.

It was announced that Sexton would leave Leinster at the end of the season to join Racing Metro, as he had failed to agree terms with the IRFU, despite his outspoken intent to remain in a blue jersey for the remainder of his career. In January 2013, Sexton informed the IRFU that he would not be renewing his contract with Leinster. He left the province at the end of the 2012–13 season.

=== Racing 92 ===
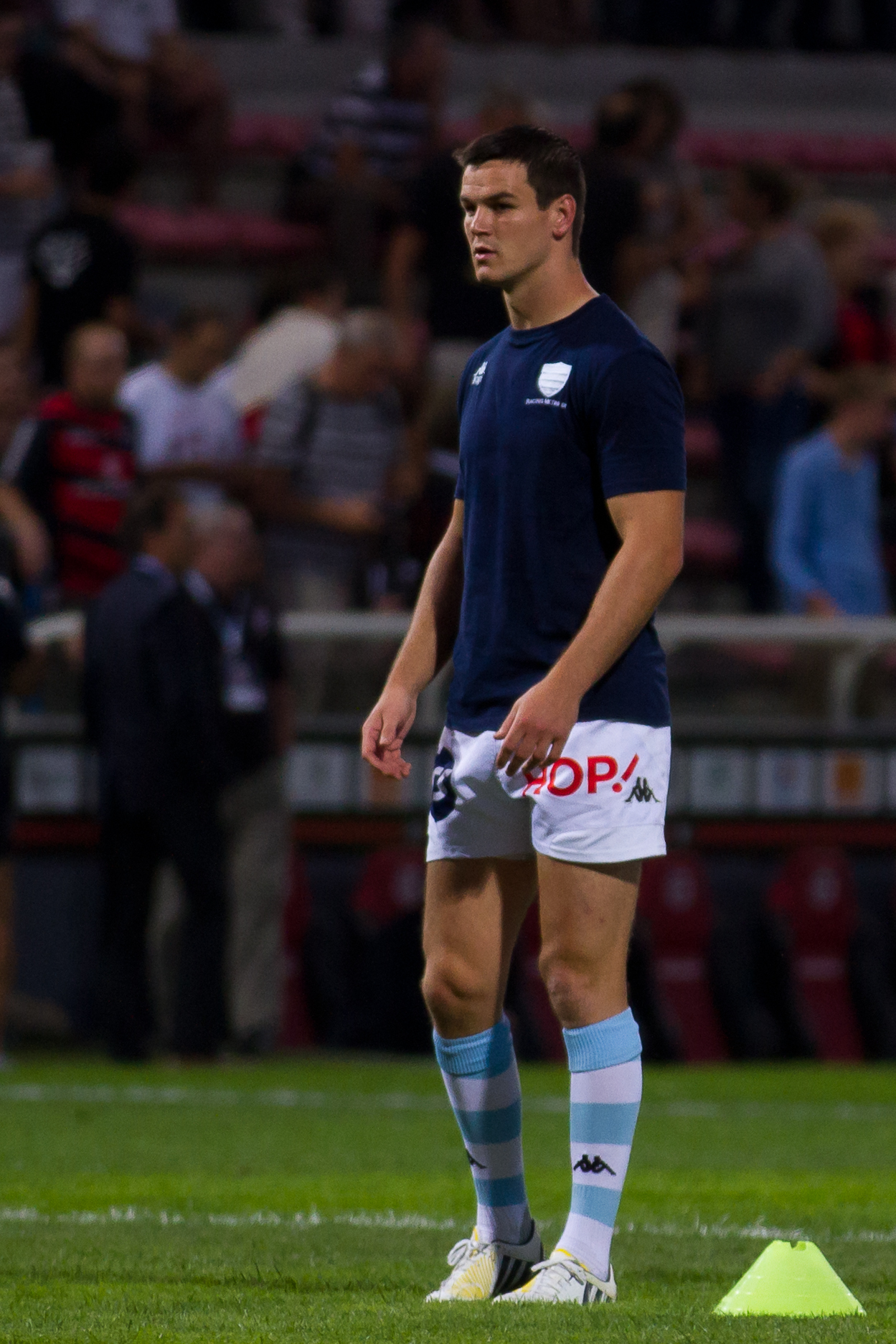
Sexton warming up for Racing Metro on 4 September 2013

Rumours began to circulate midway through the 2012–13 season that Sexton had agreed to join Racing 92 in Paris at the end of the season for a salary reported in the region of €750,000 per annum, making him one of the highest-paid players in the world. The reports were then confirmed by Sexton and Racing Metro after talks with the IRFU over a new contract had broken down. Sexton joined fellow British & Irish Lions teammates Jamie Roberts and Dan Lydiate as the club's marquee signings for the 2013–14 season, while his former adversary for the Irish 10 jersey Ronan O'Gara was confirmed as a coach for the club. Sexton stated that he had been unaware of O'Gara's arrival, but was happy at the news as both men had developed a good working friendship in their later years together in the Ireland set-up, despite a reportedly fractious early relationship during Sexton's emergence.

Sexton's departure came as a surprise to many in Ireland, as he had been a key player for both Leinster and Ireland in the preceding years, and had stated his intention to remain at the club. He cited the Parisian club's ambitious new project and impressive training facilities as factors in choosing them over traditionally more successful European clubs outside Ireland.

In Sexton's first year as a non-Leinster player, Racing Metro struggled to impose itself as a force in Europe, as they failed to qualify from the group stages of the Heineken Cup.

=== Return to Leinster ===
Following speculation during the summer of 2014, Sexton announced in September 2014 that he had signed a contract to bring him back to Leinster for the 2015–16 season until at least November 2019.

In his return season at Leinster (2015–16), Sexton appeared 16 times for Leinster, scoring two tries and 103 total points. Leinster finished the season without a trophy, losing in the Pro-12 final to fellow Irish province Connacht and failing to make it out of their group in Europe.

In the 2016–17 season, Sexton appeared 10 times for Leinster, scoring one try and 87 total points. Leinster finished the season without a trophy, losing in the Pro-12 semi-final to the Scarlets and losing in an away semi-final in Europe to long-term rival Clermont Auvergne.

In the 2017–18 season, Sexton appeared 12 times for Leinster, scoring five tries and 127 total points, in the process becoming Leinster Rugby's top point scorer of all time. Sexton helped lead Leinster back to the top both domestically, winning the Pro-14 final against rivals Scarlets, and in Europe where Leinster won the European Cup for the fourth time against Racing 92 in Bilbao. This was the fourth European Cup win for Sexton, joining an elite group of players who have won four European cups, including teammates Isa Nacewa, Devin Toner and Cian Healy.

At the start of the 2018–19 season, Sexton was announced as the Leinster club captain replacing Isa Nacewa.

== International career ==
=== Ireland ===
==== 2008–2010 ====
Sexton was selected as part of the Ireland squad for the 2008 Six Nations Championship, but sustained a fractured thumb shortly beforehand whilst playing for Leinster.

Sexton played for Ireland A in the 2009 Churchill Cup. Ireland A won the tournament, beating England Saxons 49–22 in the final, with Sexton scoring 15 points despite being sin-binned.

Sexton won his first cap for Ireland in the test against Fiji at the RDS in Dublin on 21 November 2009 scoring 16 points (five conversions and two penalty goals), kicking seven from seven in extremely difficult weather conditions and winning man of the match with his impressive international debut.

On 24 November 2009, Sexton was selected ahead of fly-half Ronan O'Gara in Ireland's autumn international against World Cup champions South Africa at Croke Park. He kicked all of Ireland's 15 points and, after the match, it was revealed that Sexton had played out Ireland's thrilling 15–10 victory with a broken hand.

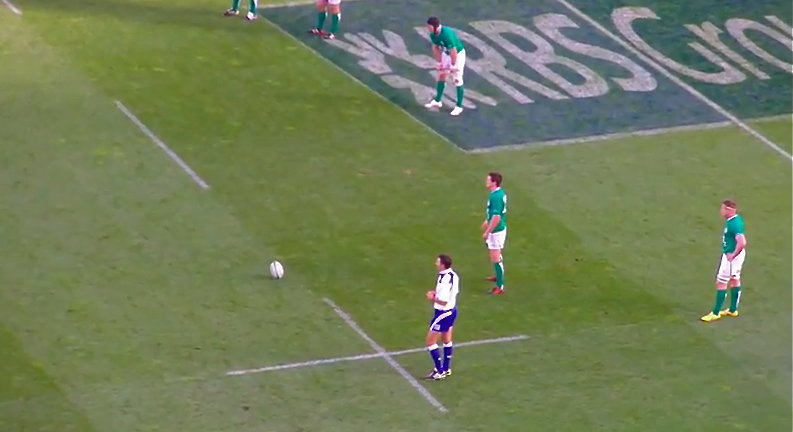
Sexton in action for Ireland

Sexton returned to the Ireland squad for the 2010 Six Nations; he came on as a substitute in Ireland's loss against France. He was selected for his first Six Nations start in the match against England at Twickenham on 27 February 2010. Ireland won the game 20–16, with Sexton being replaced by Ronan O'Gara late in the game. Sexton started against Wales and Scotland, being replaced by O'Gara in both games towards the end. Over the Six Nations, his kicking success rate was much lower than in his first few tests, as he missed several kicks.

Sexton was named in Ireland's squad for the 2010 Summer Tests, coming off the bench to replace O'Gara against New Zealand. He started against New Zealand Maori and kicked 23 points, and he started against Australia, kicking all of Ireland's 15 points in the game. Sexton then went on to play in further matches against South Africa, New Zealand and Argentina; he scored 34 points in those tests.

==== 2011–2015 ====
He had to prepare for the 2011 Six Nations Championship. He played the first game in the win against Italy, being replaced by Ronan O'Gara, who scored the winning drop goal. Sexton next started in the 22–25 defeat against France but he was then dropped to the bench against Scotland because of O'Gara's leading form. He was also on the bench against Wales. Against England, though, Sexton started and kicked 14 of the points in a 24–8 win. Sexton was named Six Nations Man of the Match following his role in Ireland's successful attempt to stop England's hunt for a Grand Slam that year.

Sexton started Ireland's first two pool matches in the 2011 Rugby World Cup and came off the bench in their last two pool matches. He came off the bench in a 10–22 defeat against Wales.

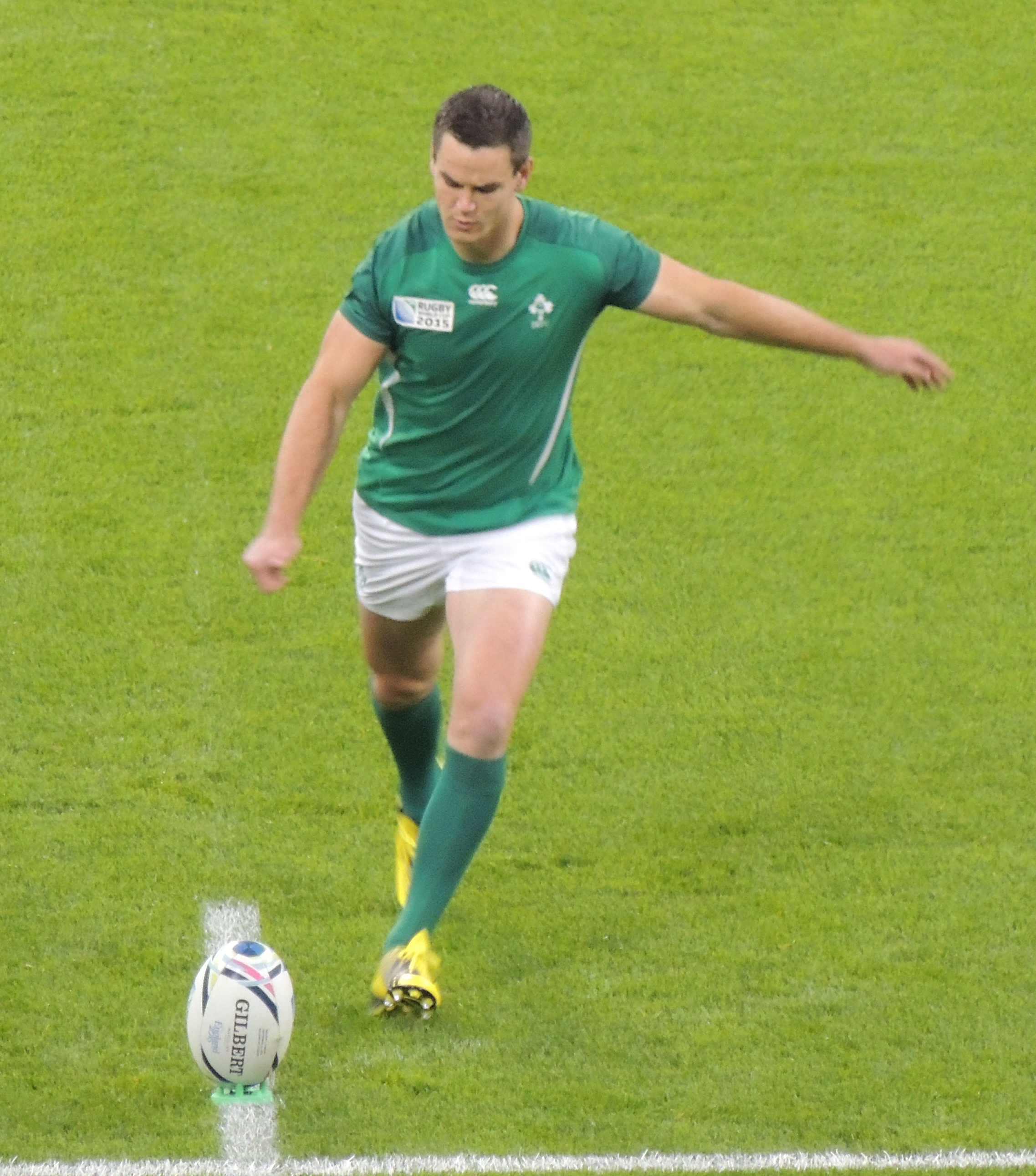
Sexton representing Ireland during the 2015 Rugby World Cup

Sexton was an influential player in their 2014 Six Nations win and was the joint highest try scorer in the championship with four tries. In the final match against France in Paris, he scored two tries and scored 17 of the team's 22 points on their way to winning the match and with it the 2014 Six Nations Championship. Despite worries of a thumb injury hindering his participation midway through the competition, Sexton competed in every game, losing only one to England at Twickenham.

Sexton was called up for the 2015 Six Nations. He played in the second game against France on 14 February and scored 15 points as Ireland won 18–11. After the first-half, he was taken off temporarily due to sudden bleeding. He also participated in the 2015 Rugby World Cup.

==== 2016–2018: World Rugby Player of the Year ====
Sexton started all five 2016 Six Nations matches. He scored 11 points (three penalties and a conversion) in a 16–16 draw with Wales. In the second match, he scored all of Ireland's points in a 9–10 defeat to France. In the third match, he scored three points in a 10–21 defeat to England. In the penultimate match of the tournament, he scored nine points (a penalty and three conversions) in a 58–15 win against Italy. In the last match of the tournament, he scored 15 points (three penalties and three conversions) against Scotland. Despite Sexton's getting sin binned in the 76th minute for a maul infringement, Ireland won 35–25.

On 2 June, Sexton was ruled out of the 2016 tour of South Africa after he sustained a shoulder injury in the Pro12 Grand Final. Sexton started the 2016 end-of-year international against New Zealand in Chicago. He scored two penalties and two conversions in a 40–29 win. Sexton missed the first two matches of the 2017 Six Nations but started the last three matches of the tournament.

In Ireland's opening 2018 Six Nations Championship fixture against France on 3 February 2018, Sexton scored an 83rd minute drop-goal after 41 phases to give Ireland a 15–13 away victory. Ireland went on to win the Grand Slam, the third in their history, with Sexton being a key player starting all 5 games, contributing 44 total points. He was later one of six nominees for 2018 Six Nations Player of the Tournament. The award went to fellow Ireland player, Jacob Stockdale. Later that season, Sexton led Ireland to its first series win in Australia since 1979. Starting both wins and contributing 31 total points. He finished the 2017–2018 season undefeated as a starter for Ireland. Sexton was the winner of World Rugby Player of the Year in 2018, having previously been a nominee for the award in 2014. He was the second Irish player in history to win the award, after the inaugural winner, Keith Wood, in 2001.

==== 2019–2023: Captaincy and final years ====
Sexton became the 106th player to captain Ireland when he led the team out at their 2019 Rugby World Cup 3rd Pool A Group match at the Kobe Misaki Stadium in Japan on Thursday, 3 October 2019. On 15 January 2020, Sexton was named as the new captain for the team ahead of the 2020 Six Nations, replacing now retired Rory Best.

On 6 November 2021, Sexton received his 100th cap playing for Ireland, playing Japan in the Autumn International series. In the 48th minute, he celebrated by scoring a try, his 16th in total.

Sexton is one of six captains to lead his side to a test series win on New Zealand soil, along with Philip J. Nel (1937 Springboks), Trevor Allan (1949 Australia), John Dawes (1971 British Lions), Andrew Slack (1986 Australia) and Philippe Saint-André (1994 France).

He was called up to be part of the Irish squad for the 2023 Six Nations. He played the opening game against Wales, but had to be subbed off for Ross Byrne due to a head collision with Liam Williams. He returned to captain Ireland in their second match against reigning champions France in a 32–19 victory. In his next match against Scotland, he equalled Ronan O'Gara's record for total points in all Six Nations matches. In his final Six Nations match against England, he broke record and captained Ireland to win the Grand Slam, only the fourth time in history that Ireland had won one.

In August 2023, he was selected to be captain of Ireland's World Cup squad ahead of the 2023 World Cup in France, his fourth World Cup campaign. He played in Ireland's opening game against Romania, scoring two tries and seven conversions to score a total of 24 points before being subbed off, beating Ronan O'Gara's record for most points scored for Ireland in World Cup matches. The result was Ireland winning 82–8, the country's biggest win in a World Cup fixture. During Ireland's second game against Tonga, Sexton broke Ronan O'Gara's record for the most points scored by an Irish player in international rugby. In Ireland's third game against South Africa, Sexton played over 70 minutes, scoring a penalty and a conversion as Ireland would narrowly beat the world champions 13–8. He played Ireland's fourth and last Pool Stage game against Scotland. He scored three conversions before being subbed off at the start of the second half. On 14 October, Sexton played the full 80 minutes in the last game of his career as Ireland lost 24–28 to New Zealand in the quarterfinals.

=== British & Irish Lions ===
As a result of his performances for club and country, Sexton was selected to play for the 2013 British & Irish Lions in their tour to Australia. He played in all three of the tests, scoring one try.

Sexton was then selected for the 2017 Lions tour of New Zealand. Sexton came off the bench for the first test against New Zealand. He started the second and third tests, despite suffering a broken wrist in the second test. Despite the broken wrist and a rupture to his ankle tendon sustained during the first half, Sexton played 73 minutes of the third test before being replaced by Ben Te'o.

== Coaching ==
=== Ireland ===
In October 2024, it was announced that Sexton would return to the Ireland setup on a consultancy basis to work with the out-halves for the Autumn Nations Series. He returned to the setup for the 2025 Six Nations, with the primary role of preparing the fly-halves, as well as working with Caelan Doris on the captaincy role.

Sexton was assistant coach to Andy Farrell on 2025 British & Irish Lions tour to Australia.

== Personal life ==
Sexton is married to Laura (née Priestly), since 2013 and has three children. He holds a Bachelor of Commerce degree (2012) from UCD, University College Dublin.

Sexton was the cover athlete of the video game Rugby 20.

His autobiography (with Peter O'Reilly) titled Obsessed was released in October 2024, winning the Irish Book Awards' "Sports Book of the Year" in November.

=== Charity work ===
Sexton has been an ambassador with Make-A-Wish Ireland since September 2009. He helps grant wishes to children with life-threatening medical conditions and launches various fundraising campaigns.

== Playing style ==
Sexton has been a key figure in Irish and club rugby due to both his defensive play and his impactful passing when in attack. He is also a place-kicker for both club and country. As of June 2013, Sexton has scored 282 points in all test matches, including 115 points in four seasons in the Six Nations Tournament. As of 7 October 2017, Sexton became Leinster's all-time leading points scorer (overtaking Felipe Contepomi in the process) with 1234 points.

In May 2012 former Ireland and Leinster fly-half Ollie Campbell stated before Leinster's third European Cup in four years that Sexton is a "class act with hardly any weaknesses", and that during Leinster's rise to the summit of European rugby the "only significant Heineken Cup defeat over the last four seasons occurred when Jonathan Sexton was not playing".

== Career statistics ==
=== List of international tries ===
Try number	Position	Points	Tries scored	Result	Opposition	Venue	Date	Ref.
1	Fly-half	8	1	Lost	France	Aviva Stadium	20 August 2011	
2–3	Fly-half	19	2	Won	Argentina	Aviva Stadium	24 November 2012	
4	Fly-half	5	1	Won	Australia	Stadium Australia	6 July 2013	
5–6	Fly-half	17	2	Won	Italy	Aviva Stadium	8 March 2014	
7–8	Fly-half	17	2	Won	France	Stade de France	15 March 2014	
9	Fly-half	13	1	Won	Argentina	Estadio Centenario	7 June 2014	
10	Fly-half	14	1	Won	Canada	Millennium Stadium	19 September 2015	
11	Fly-half	11	1	Won	France	Aviva Stadium	10 March 2019	
12–13	Fly-half	18	2	Won	Samoa	Level5 Stadium	12 October 2019	
14	Fly-half	19	1	Won	Scotland	Aviva Stadium	1 February 2020	
15	Fly-half	18	1	Won	Italy	Aviva Stadium	24 October 2020	
16	Fly-half	16	1	Won	Japan	Aviva Stadium	6 November 2021	
17–18	Fly-half	24	2	Won	Romania	Nouveau Stade de Bordeaux	9 September 2023	
19	Fly-half	16	1	Won	Tonga	Stade de la Beaujoire	16 September 2023	

=== International analysis by opposition ===
Opposition	Played	Win	Loss	Draw	Tries	Points	Win %
Argentina	6	6	0	0	3	86	100%
Australia (Note: Includes three British and Irish Lions test appearances and five points obtained during the 2013 Australia tour.)	10	6	4	0	1	88	60%
Canada	1	1	0	0	1	14	100%
England	16	8	8	0	0	123	50%
Fiji	1	1	0	0	0	16	100%
France	13	7	5	1	4	121	53.85%
Italy	11	11	0	0	3	120	100%
Japan	1	1	0	0	1	16	100%
New Zealand (Note: Includes three British and Irish Lions test appearances obtained during the 2017 New Zealand tour.)	18	6	11	1	0	97	33.33%
Romania	1	1	0	0	2	24	100%
Russia	2	2	0	0	0	8	100%
Samoa	1	1	0	0	2	18	100%
Scotland	16	14	2	0	1	144	87.5%
South Africa	7	5	2	0	0	80	71.43%
Tonga	1	1	0	0	1	16	100%
United States	1	1	0	0	0	5	100%
Wales	18	9	8	1	0	137	50%
Career	124	81	40	3	19	1,113	65.32%

as of 9 November 2023

== Honours ==
=== World Rugby Awards ===
On 25 November 2018, at the World Rugby Awards, which were hosted in Monaco, Sexton was awarded the World Rugby Player of the Year. He was only the second Irish Rugby Football Union player to receive the award (the first Irish Rugby Football Union player to win it was Keith Wood back in 2001), the third was Josh van der Flier in 2022. At the same awards, Ireland was awarded World Rugby Team of the Year and Irish Coach Joe Schmidt walked away with World Rugby Coach of the Year.

St. Mary's College

- 1× Leinster Schools Senior Cup: 2002

University College Dublin

- 1× UCD Foundation Day Medalist: 2014

Leinster

- 4× European Rugby Champions Cup: 2009, 2011, 2012, 2018
- 1× European Challenge Cup: 2013
- 6× Pro14: 2008, 2013, 2018, 2019, 2020, 2021
- 2× Irish Shield: 2022, 2023

Ireland

- 5× Six Nations Championship: 2009, 2014, 2015, 2018, 2023
- 3× Grand Slam: 2009, 2018, 2023
- 4× Triple Crown: 2009, 2018, 2022, 2023
- 3× Test Series: 2014, 2018, 2022

Ireland Wolfhounds

- 1× Churchill Cup: 2009

British & Irish Lions

- 2× British & Irish Lions selection: 2013, 2017

Individual

- 1× World Rugby Player of the Year: 2018
- 3× World Rugby Player of the Year nominee: 2014, 2018, 2022
