= Seán O'Brien (rugby union, born 1994) =

- Born: 9 December 1994 (age 31) Galway, Ireland
- Height: 1.95 m (6 ft 5 in)
- Weight: 112 kg (17 st 9 lb)
- School: Calasanctius College; Cistercian College
- University: NUI Galway

Rugby union career
- Position(s): Flanker, Lock
- Current team: Connacht
Amateur team(s)
Years	Team	Apps	(Points)
- Galwegians
Provincial / State sides
Years	Team	Apps	(Points)
2015–2021	Connacht	60	(15)
- Correct as of 8 Jan 2021
International career
Years	Team	Apps	(Points)
2014	Ireland U20	4	(0)
- Correct as of 21 January 2016

Seán O'Brien (born 9 December 1994) is a professional rugby union player from Ireland. He plays as a lock and across the back row. O'Brien currently plays for Irish provincial side Connacht in the Pro14, after being promoted from the academy ahead of the 2015–16 season.

== Early life ==
O'Brien was born in Galway and grew up in Clarinbridge, a village in the county. He was involved with Galwegians from a young age, with his father and grandfather having ties to the club. O'Brien also played hurling with Clarinbridge in his youth. His sister Katie O'Brien is a Paralympic rower.

O'Brien was a student at the Cistercian College in Roscrea, but attended the Calasanctius College in Oranmore for his Junior Certificate and fifth year. He returned to Roscrea in his final year to graduate. O'Brien is also a student of NUI Galway, studying civil law.

== Rugby career ==
=== Connacht ===
O'Brien entered the Connacht academy ahead of the 2013–14 season. O'Brien played for the province's second-tier side, the Connacht Eagles during the course of the season and was named the province's under-20 player of the season. After an injury ruled O'Brien out of the 2014 Junior World Cup, he failed to make a senior breakthrough in the 2014–15 season.

O'Brien returned from injury ahead of the 2015–16 season. He featured for Connacht in their preseason match against Grenoble, and was made captain of the Eagles side. In November 2015, O'Brien was named in the Connacht squad for a trip to the Siberian city of Krasnoyarsk for a 2015–16 Challenge Cup game. He made his senior debut on 14 November in the game against Enisey-STM, coming on after 58 minutes as a replacement for captain John Muldoon. O'Brien made his first league appearance two weeks later in a 2015–16 Pro12 derby against Munster, coming off the bench for Eoghan Masterson as Connacht won at Thomond Park for the first time since 1986. In January 2016 it was announced that O'Brien had signed a senior contract with contract, which sees him become a member of the full squad for the 2016–17 season.

=== International ===
O'Brien has represented Ireland at a number of under-age levels. He played for both the under-18 schools team and the under-18 club team. He also played for the under-19 side.

O'Brien made his debut for the Irish under-20 team in the 2014 Six Nations Under 20s Championship against Scotland. He played in the following game against Wales, but was forced off with an injury early in the game. Despite being named in the initial team, O'Brien missed the next game against England. He returned from his injury in time to face Italy and France and due to the absence of Leister's Dan Leavy through injury, O'Brien was named captain for these games. He made a total of four appearances in the tournament, all of these coming as starts. In April 2014 the Irish squad for the 2014 Junior World Cup was announced, with O'Brien named captain. O'Brien missed the tournament through injury however, being replaced as captain by Munster's Jack O'Donoghue.
