= Kieran Marmion =

Irish rugby union player

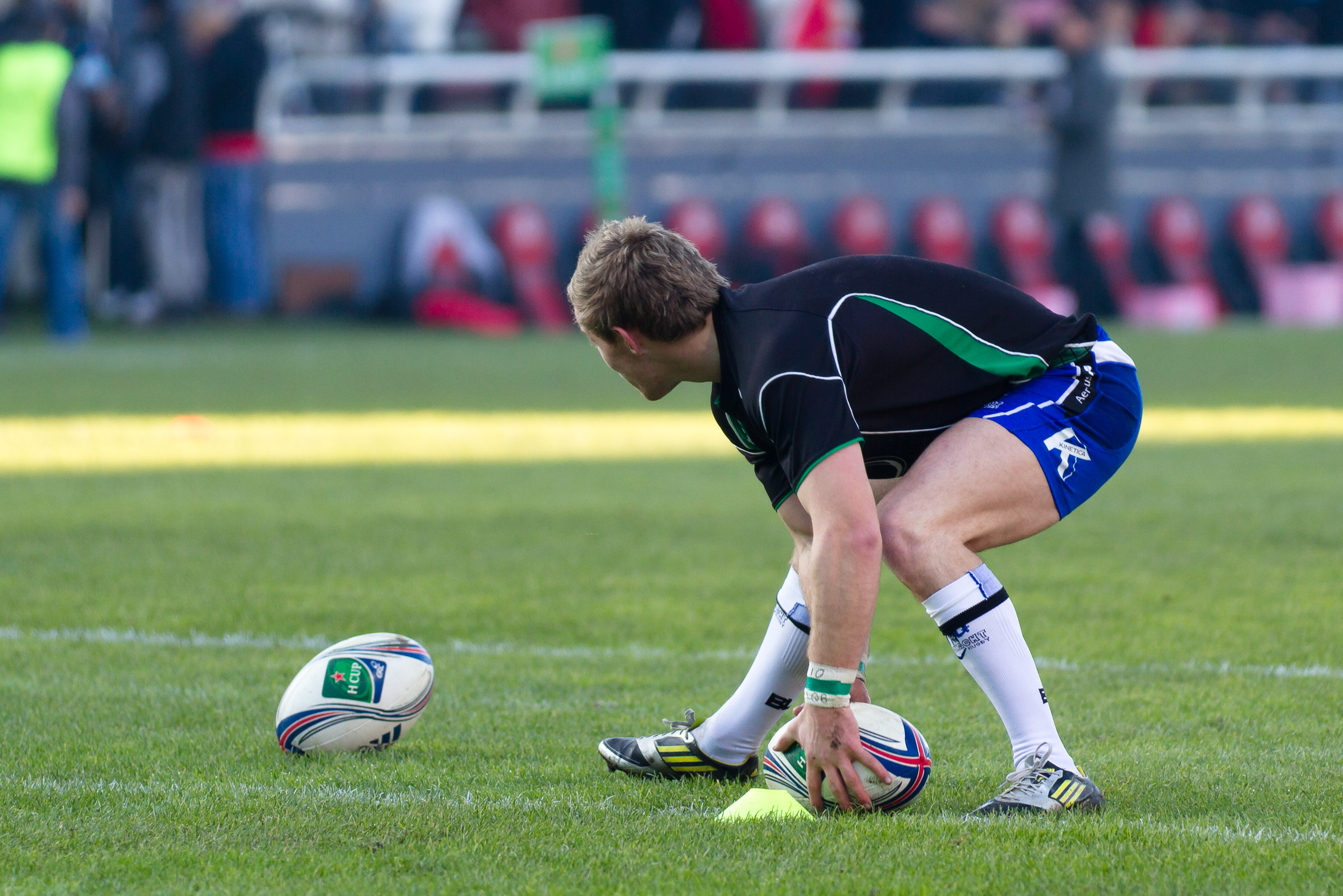
- Marmion warming up for Connacht
- Born: Kieran Dominic Marmion; 11 February 1992 (age 34) Barking, England
- Height: 1.78 m (5 ft 10 in)
- Weight: 86 kg (13 st 8 lb; 190 lb)
- School: Christ College Brecon / Kirkham Grammar School
- University: University of Wales Institute Cardiff

Rugby union career
- Position: Scrum-half
Amateur team(s)
Years	Team	Apps	(Points)
- Galway Corinthians RFC
Senior career
Years	Team	Apps	(Points)
2012–23	Connacht	230	(215)
2023–	Bristol Bears	80	(120)
- Correct as of 18 October 2023
International career
Years	Team	Apps	(Points)
- Ireland U18
- Ireland U19
2011–12	Ireland U20	15	(5)
2014–	Ireland Wolfhounds	2	(0)
2014–	Ireland	28	(25)
- Correct as of 29 November 2020

Kieran Marmion (born 11 February 1992) is an Irish rugby union player who primarily plays as a scrum-half. Marmion currently plays for English side Bristol Bears.

Marmion came into Connacht's academy through the Irish Exiles program and plays his club rugby with Galway Corinthians. Marmion has played his international rugby for Ireland since under-age level making his full debut in 2014.

== Early life ==
Marmion was born in Barking, England to an Irish father and English mother and was raised in Brecon, Wales. He is the son of former Saracens centre Mick Marmion. Marmion attended Christ College, Brecon, and Kirkham Grammar School where he was part of their successful rugby sevens team being a runner up at the Rosslyn Park Schools sevens. He was also a student at the University of Wales Institute Cardiff. Marmion was involved in the Irish Exiles set-up from a young age, and represented the Exiles at Under-18, Under-19 and Under-20 levels. This involvement with the Exiles led to Marmion being called up for the Ireland Under-20 team, which in turn led to him being signed to the academy of Connacht, one of the Irish provincial teams, in 2011.

== Career ==
=== Connacht ===
Marmion came to Connacht from the IRFU Exiles system, which helps Irish-qualified players overseas to make their way into professional rugby in Ireland. He made his Pro12 debut for Connacht on 1 September 2012 whilst still in the academy, starting against Cardiff Blues. Marmion then made his Heineken Cup debut on 13 October 2012, starting against Zebre in Connacht's 10–19 win, their first ever away win in the competition. Marmion signed a two-year contract with Connacht in November 2012. He was named as Connacht's Player of the Month for October 2012. In his first season with Connacht, Marmion started all 22 league games and all 6 Heineken Cup games.

Marmion scored his first try for Connacht on 28 September 2013, against Ospreys in the 2013–14 Pro12. Marmion again featured in all of Connacht's competitive games for the season, playing in the league and the 2013–14 Heineken Cup, with Pro12 matches against Benetton Treviso and Munster the only two games that he did not start in. Marmion signed a further contract extension with Connacht in November 2013, which will see him remain with the province until at least the summer of 2016.

=== International ===
Despite being raised in Wales, Marmion represents Ireland at international level, his parents being Irish, and Marmion having come through the Exiles. Marmion was capped at various under-age levels, including playing for the Under-18 and Under-20 teams.

Marmion made his debut for Ireland Under-20 on 10 June 2011, starting against England Under-20 in their opening 33–25 defeat of the 2011 IRB Junior World Championship. Marmion went on to start every game for Ireland U20 in the tournament. He also started for Ireland U20 in their historic 19–23 win against South Africa Under-20 on 4 June 2012, in the opening game of the 2012 IRB Junior World Championship.

Marmion was named in the Ireland squad for the 2013 tour to North America on 19 May 2013. In January 2014, Marmion was named, along with six other uncapped players, in Joe Schmidt's extended 44-man squad for the 2014 Six Nations Championship. He came off the bench for Ireland Wolfhounds in their friendly against England Saxons on 25 January 2014.

Marmion made his first appearance for the senior Ireland side during the 2014 end of season tests. He came on as a second-half replacement for Conor Murray against Argentina as Ireland won the game on a score of 29–17.

=== Honours ===
- 2015/2016: Pro12 Winner with Connacht Rugby
- 2015/2016: Pro12 Dream Team (Team of the Season)
