= Ross Molony =

Irish rugby union player

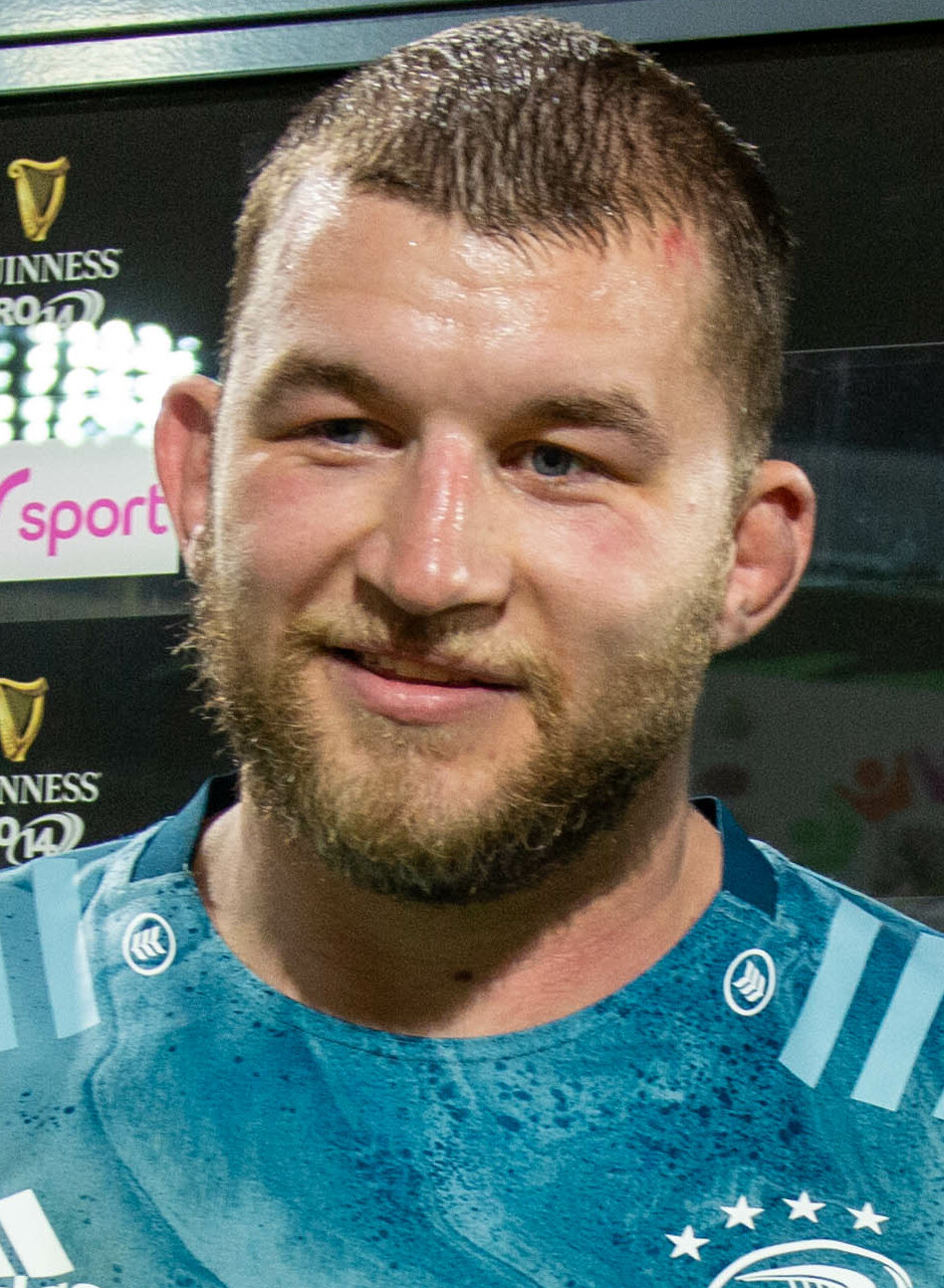
- Molony in 2021
- Born: 11 May 1994 (age 32) Dublin, Ireland
- Height: 1.98 m (6 ft 6 in)
- Weight: 111 kg (17.5 st; 245 lb)
- School: St Michael's College
- University: University College Dublin

Rugby union career
- Position: Lock
Senior career
Years	Team	Apps	(Points)
2015–2024	Leinster	179	(25)
2024–	Bath	43	(10)
- Correct as of 1 May 2026
International career
Years	Team	Apps	(Points)
2014	Ireland U20	10	(0)
2022	Ireland Wolfhounds	1	(0)
- Correct as of 15 November 2022

Ross Molony (11 May 1994) is an Irish professional rugby union player, who plays in the second-row position for Premiership club Bath.

== Club career ==
While in the Leinster academy for the 2015–16 season he featured in the senior team, earning his first full professional contract from the 2016–17 season. He had previously represented Leinster at underage level. Molony was given the man of the match award in his European Champions' Cup debut in Leinster's 25–11 home win over Bath Rugby.

In April 2024, Molony confirmed that he would join Premiership side Bath on a three-year contract.

== International career ==
He previously played for the Ireland U20s in the Junior World Championship and u-20 Six Nations tournaments. In June 2021 he was called up to the senior Ireland squad for the Summer tests.
