= Peter Robb (rugby union) =

Irish rugby union player

- Born: 19 July 1994 (age 32) Dublin, Ireland
- Height: 1.90 m (6 ft 3 in)
- Weight: 110 kg (17 st 5 lb)
- School: Blackrock College
- University: University College Dublin; NUI Galway

Rugby union career
- Position: Centre
- Current team: Ealing Trailfinders
Amateur team(s)
Years	Team	Apps	(Points)
- Old Belvedere
Senior career
Years	Team	Apps	(Points)
2015–2022	Connacht	49	(20)
2022–	Ealing Trailfinders	49	(20)
- Correct as of 3 Dec 2021
International career
Years	Team	Apps	(Points)
2014	Ireland U20	5	(0)
- Correct as of 14 March 2014

Peter Robb (born 19 July 1994) is a professional rugby union player from Ireland. He plays primarily as a centre, usually at inside centre for Ealing Trailfinders. Peter played for Irish provincial team Connacht in the Pro14 and in the European Rugby Champions Cup from 2014 to 2022.

== Early life ==
Born in Dublin, Robb received his primary education at Willow Park school and is a graduate of Blackrock College. He attended University College Dublin and later NUI Galway after joining Galway-based Connacht.

Robb started playing rugby at young age, playing at either out-half or centre while at Willow Park and later moving permanently to centre while at Blackrock. Robb represented Leinster at different under-age levels, and during this time played his club rugby with Old Belvedere.

== Club career ==
=== Connacht ===
Robb joined the Connacht academy in 2014. He did not feature for the senior side in his first year, but played for the province's second-tier side, the Connacht Eagles, during the course of the season. He made his senior Connacht debut in November 2015 against Enisei STM in freezing -20 °C conditions in Krasnoyarsk, Siberia, Russia as part of the second tier European Rugby Challenge Cup competition. At 107 kg he is known for his physical approach to play.

=== Ealing Trailfinders ===
On 29 June 2022, it was confirmed that Robb travelled to England to sign for Ealing Trailfinders in the RFU Championship from the 2022–23 season.

== International career ==
Robb has represented Ireland at under-age international level. He was part of the Irish under-20 squad in the 2014 Six Nations Under 20s Championship, playing in all five games. Later that year, Robb was named in the squad for the 2014 Junior World Championship, but missed the tournament after picking up an injury in a warm up game.
