= Mick Kearney =

Irish rugby union player (born 1991)

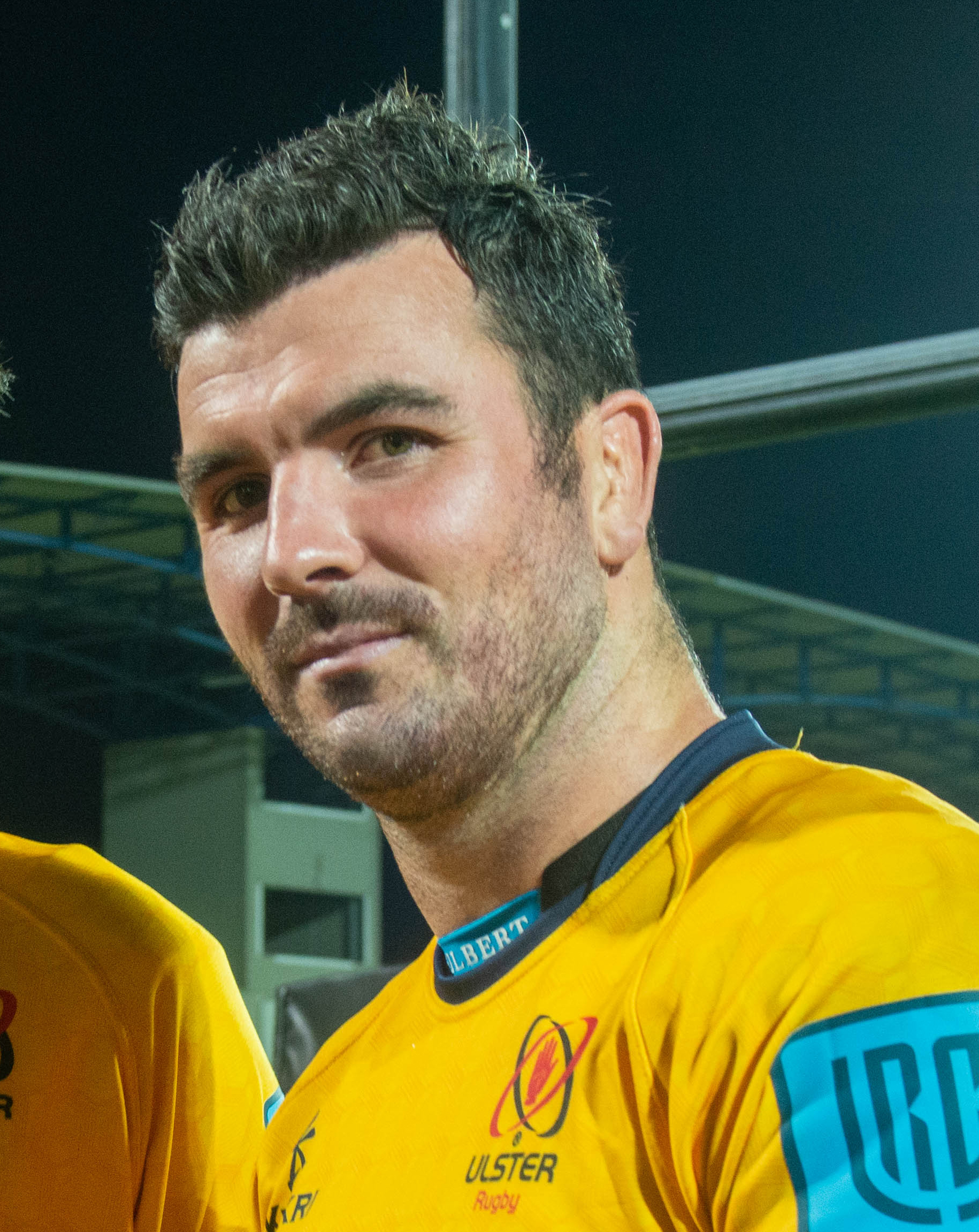
- Born: Michael Kearney; 29 March 1991 (age 35) Dublin, Ireland
- Height: 1.98 m (6 ft 6 in)
- Weight: 116 kg (18.3 st; 256 lb)
- School: Mount Temple Comprehensive

Rugby union career
- Position(s): Lock, Flanker
Amateur team(s)
Years	Team	Apps	(Points)
- Clontarf
Senior career
Years	Team	Apps	(Points)
2011–2015	Connacht	68	(15)
2015–2019	Leinster	47	(5)
2019–2021	Zebre	32	(5)
2021−2022	Ulster	9	(0)
- Correct as of 20 April 2022
International career
Years	Team	Apps	(Points)
2011	Ireland U20	10	(0)
2014	Emerging Ireland	2	(5)
- Correct as of 10 Feb 2015

Mick Kearney (born 29 March 1991) is an Irish rugby union player, currently playing for Irish side Ulster in the United Rugby Championship. His primary position is lock, though he has also played as a flanker.

== Career ==
=== Club ===
Kearney, who is originally from Dublin and attended Mount Temple Comprehensive School, joined Connacht in 2011. He had previously played for amateur club Clontarf and been part of the Leinster youth set-up, from schools to under-19's and Leinster colleges. He made his debut in a home match against Welsh side the Ospreys on 26 November that year, coming off the bench in a 17–6 loss. Kearney made his first senior start for Connacht against his native province Leinster on 1 January 2012, playing at blindside flanker. At the end of his first season with Connacht, Kearney had made 11 Pro12 appearances for the team, 5 of them starts. He had also played 3 times in the Heineken Cup, coming on as a replacement in both matches against Gloucester and the away match with Toulouse.

Kearney played more often for Connacht in his second season, making 8 starts and 7 replacement appearances in the 2012–13 Pro12. He also played for the province in 4 of their 6 pool games in the 2013–14 Heineken Cup, starting all but one of his games. He scored his first try for the team in a Pro12 match away to Edinburgh on 12 April 2013, which Connacht won 32–24.

In April 2015 it was announced that Kearney would return to his native province of Leinster for the 2015–16 season. Kearney was released by Leinster at the end of the 2018–19 season, and joined Italian side Zebre ahead of the 2019–20 season, where former Leinster teammate Ian Nagle had also moved to. On 30 May 2021 he left Zebre, and on 26 August he joined Ulster on a short-term contract. He left Ulster at the end of the 2021–22 season, announcing his retirement in May 2022.

=== International ===
Kearney has represented Ireland at under-age levels including playing for the Irish under-20 team. He was part of the squad that went to the 2011 IRB Junior World Championship in Italy. He started each of the group matches against England, South Africa and Scotland in the second row, as well as the first game in the 5–8th place play-offs against South Africa. He was left as a replacement for the final game against Wales, however.
