= Pat Lam =

NZ & Samoa international rugby union player

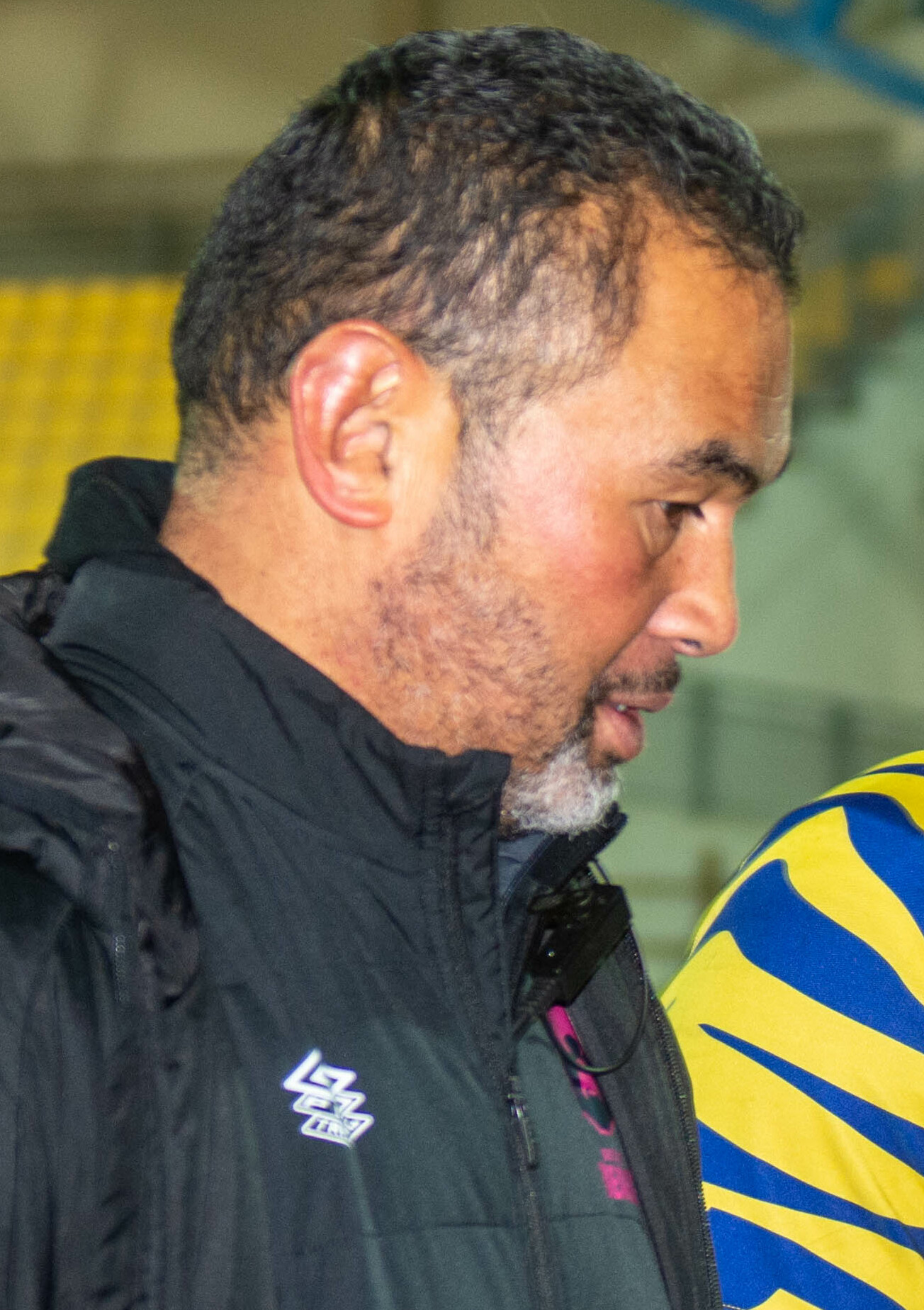
- Born: Patrick Richard Lam; 29 September 1968 (age 58) Auckland, New Zealand
- Height: 1.88 m (6 ft 2 in)
- Weight: 95 kg (15.0 st; 209 lb)
- School: St Peter's College
- Notable relative: Dylan Mika (cousin) Ben Lam (nephew) Jack Lam (cousin)

Rugby union career
- Position: Number 8
Amateur team(s)
Years	Team	Apps	(Points)
1990–1996	Marist Brothers Old Boys		
Senior career
Years	Team	Apps	(Points)
1997–1998	Newcastle Falcons		
1998–2001	Northampton Saints	43	(45)
2001–2002	Newcastle Falcons	54	(100)
Provincial / State sides
Years	Team	Apps	(Points)
1990–1994	Auckland	30	
1995–1996	North Harbour	16	
Super Rugby
Years	Team	Apps	(Points)
1996	Crusaders	3	(0)
International career
Years	Team	Apps	(Points)
1987	New Zealand Schools		
1989	New Zealand Colts	3	(0)
1991–1999	Samoa	34	(25)
1992	New Zealand		
National sevens team
Years	Team		Comps
1989	New Zealand		
Coaching career
- Years: Team
- 2003: Scotland (Assistant)
- 2004–2008: Auckland
- 2006: Pacific Islanders
- 2009–2012: Blues
- 2012: Samoa
- 2013–2017: Connacht
- 2017–: Bristol Bears
- Correct as of 2 March 2018

Patrick Richard Lam (born 29 September 1968) is a rugby union coach and former player. He is currently Director of Rugby at Bristol Bears in England's Premiership Rugby.

Born in New Zealand, he represented New Zealand in schools and under-21 rugby. He played for Auckland, North Harbour, Crusaders, Newcastle Falcons and Northampton Saints. He also won 25 caps for Samoa, including at the 1991, 1995 and 1999 World Cups. His usual position was number 8.

Since retiring as a player he has coached teams including Auckland and Connacht.

== Playing career ==
Lam was born in Auckland and attended St Peter's College, Grafton, and captained the New Zealand Secondary Schools rugby team. He played at loose forward for Auckland, North Harbour and Crusaders, before moving to England where he first played for Newcastle Falcons. In his first season at Newcastle he made 22 appearances as they won the 1997-98 Premiership. However, after that triumph he moved on to Northampton Saints, with whom he won the 1999–2000 Heineken Cup. Lam moved back to Newcastle Falcons for the 2001–02 season, playing with the club for a year before retiring.

Lam played one game for the All Blacks in 1992 (becoming All Black no. 928), a non-test game against Sydney. He had played for Samoa first in 1991 and went on to captain them and represented them in three World Cups, retiring from international rugby after the 1999 tournament. Samoa reached the 1991 and 1995 quarter-finals against expectations.

Lam has also played for the Barbarians. He played in 2002 against England as a replacement, scoring a try. In his second game for the side, Lam captained the team to a victory over Wales, scoring another try in his final game before retirement.

== Coaching career ==
=== Scotland ===
Lam's first coaching position was as an assistant coach to Scotland at the 2003 Rugby World Cup.

=== Auckland and The Blues ===
He was head coach of Auckland from 2004 until 2008. During his Auckland tenure he also coached the Pacific Islanders in 2006. He was head coach of Super Rugby team the Blues from 2009 to 2012.

=== Manu Samoa ===
He worked with Samoa on the team's 2012 tour. Samoa's victories saw it reach eighth in the IRB rankings, and a secure second tier position for the 2015 Rugby World Cup.

=== Connacht Rugby ===
Lam was appointed as head coach of the Pro12 side, Connacht Rugby in Ireland, ahead of the 2013-14 season. On 28 May 2016, Connacht won their first ever major trophy, the 2015–16 Pro12 after a 20–10 win against Leinster in the final.

=== Bristol Bears ===
Lam left Connacht in the summer of 2017 to take up the head coaching role with Bristol Bears. He was later appointed Director of Rugby. He won the 2019-20 European Rugby Challenge Cup with Bristol Bears after a 32–19 win against Toulon In September 2021 with over 2 years of his contract left to run, Lam signed a five-year contract extension which sees him remain at Bristol until the summer of 2028.

== Honours ==
Player

- English Premiership 1998
- Heineken Cup 2000
- RPA players player of the year 2000

Manager

- ITM Cup 2005, 2007
- Pro12 2016
- European Rugby Challenge Cup 2020
- Honorary Doctorate from NUI Galway, conferred upon him on 17 October 2016
