= 2014–15 Connacht Rugby season =

- Ground(s): Galway Sportsgrounds (Capacity: 7,800)
- CEO: Willie Ruane
- Coach: Pat Lam
- Captain: John Muldoon
- Most appearances: George Naoupu (28)
- Top scorer: Jack Carty (119)
- Most tries: Matt Healy (9)
- Pro12 Challenge Cup: 7th Quarter-finals
| 1st kit | 2nd kit | 3rd kit |

The 2014–15 season was Irish provincial rugby union side Connacht Rugby's fourteenth season competing in the Pro12, and the team's nineteenth season as a professional side. It was also Pat Lam's second season in charge of the side.

As well as playing in the Pro12, Connacht competed in the newly established Rugby Challenge Cup, having played in the now-defunct Heineken Cup the previous season. The second-tier side, the Connacht Eagles, competed in the 2014–15 British and Irish Cup.

== Season ==
=== Background ===
The 2014–15 season saw the Heineken Cup replaced by the 20 team Rugby Champions Cup and the creation of this competition meant the Pro12 standings would have a greater impact on European qualification. Under the previous format, the Pro12 provided a minimum of ten teams, with Scotland and Italy providing two teams each, and Ireland and Wales both providing three.

The new system saw one place now being reserved for the highest finishing Pro12 team from each of four participating countries, along with three other qualifiers based solely on league position, for a total of seven teams. The other teams were to be entered in the new second-tier competition, the Rugby Challenge Cup. This meant Connacht were no longer required to finish ahead of another Irish province or rely on an Irish victory in a European tournament to qualify for the top tier of European rugby.

The final tournament spot in the 2015–16 Rugby Champions Cup was decided by a playoff involving the Pro12's highest finishing team that is not already qualified, along with the seventh highest finishing clubs from France's Top 14 and the English Premiership.

On the player front, Connacht entered the season with a new captain following the forced retirement of Craig Clarke due to persistent concussions. They will also be without the playing services of former captain and centurion Gavin Duffy, whose contract was not renewed the previous season. It was later announced that he was taking up a role with the province's commercial team.

Due to their 10th-place finish in the 2013–14 Pro12, Connacht were entered into the 2014–15 Rugby Challenge Cup, which replaced the European Challenge Cup, a competition Connacht hadn't competed in since the 2010–11 season. The draw for the Challenge Cup pool stages took place on 10 June 2014, with Connacht named in the same group as Exeter Chiefs, Bayonne and La Rochelle.

=== September ===
Connacht opened the season with victories at home against Newport Gwent Dragons and away to Edinburgh. The team then beat provincial rivals Leinster at home, the 10–9 win giving Connacht their first inter-provincial victory since beating Leinster in the same fixture in the 2012–13 season. Connacht experienced their first defeat of the season in the next round, losing to Glasgow Warriors in their final game of the month.

=== October ===
Following their opening defeat of the season to Glasgow, Connacht opened the month of October with a draw at home to Cardiff Blues the following week, but were able to return to winning ways before the first break for European matches, beating Benetton Treviso 6–9 in Italy. Connacht opened their 2014–15 Challenge Cup campaign at the Sportsgrounds on 18 October with a 48–12 bonus point victory over Top 14 side La Rochelle. The following week, however, saw the province beaten 33–13 away to Exeter Chiefs. Connacht's first game after the European break saw them beaten 26–11 in Wales by the Ospreys on Halloween night.

=== November ===
A break in the league for the November internationals meant that Connacht didn't play a competitive match in the month until 21 November. When they returned to action, Connacht picked up a comfortable bonus point victory over Zebre at home, posting a final score of 43–3. The team followed this with a 14–8 win against 6th place rivals Scarlets at the Sportsgrounds to keep their unbeaten home record intact.

=== December ===
Connacht opened the month of December with a crucial double-header against Bayonne in the Challenge Cup, and won the first of these games comfortably, picking up a bonus point in a 42–19 victory to narrow the gap to Exeter Chiefs. Connacht named an entirely new team for the return leg, and despite being 11 points down in the second half, the team fought back to win 27–29, with academy scrum-half Caolin Blade scoring both tries.

After the two European matches, Connacht finished 2015 with two provincial derbies in a row over the Christmas period. Connacht lost the first of these matches against Leinster in Dublin. This loss was followed by a narrow away defeat to Ulster on Saint Stephen's Day in the last match of the calendar year.

=== January ===
On New Year's Day, Connacht picked up where they had left off in 2014, with another league match against Irish opposition. In the final derby of this period, Connacht managed to pick up a win, beating Munster 24–16. Following this high however, Connacht were beaten at home for the first time in the season, losing 13–16 to Edinburgh. The poor form was carried into Europe as Connacht lost another home match in quick succession, being beaten 24–33 by the Exeter Chiefs. The team was able to recover the following week to beat La Rochelle and secure a place in the knock-out stage of the competition.

=== February ===
There were no games in the opening weekend of the month as the 2015 Six Nations Championship was taking place. On 15 February Connacht returned to league action, suffering a 32–14 loss away to Scarlets. The following week, Connacht were away to another Welsh side, this time facing Newport Gwent Dragons, and recovered from the previous week's disappointment to emerge 25–30 winners.

=== March ===
Connacht opened the month of March with bonus point victory over Benetton Treviso, crushing the Italians 53–5. On 6 March, Connacht faced Cardiff Blues away ahead of a tough series of matches against teams in the play-off places, making the game important in the qualification for the 2015–16 Rugby Champions Cup. Connacht were beaten 18–17 by a late try, after the referee controversially gave a penalty against Connacht with the game in overtime after Cardiff appeared to have knocked the ball on. In the aftermath of the game, Pat Lam criticised touch judge Leighton Hodges and lodged a complaint with the league. Lam was later charged with misconduct for his comments. In spite of Lam's comments and the misconduct charge, Hodges refereed Connacht's next match, away to Munster in Thomond Park, where Connacht were beaten 42–20.

=== April ===
The team's first match in April was a Challenge Cup quarter-final against Gloucester in Kingsholm Stadium. After going in 14–0 down, Connacht held the hosts scoreless in the second half and pulled themselves back into the match with a penalty try. They couldn't make up the deficit however, and Connacht were knocked out of the Cup by 14–7.

In their return to the Pro12, Connacht suffered their second home league defeat of the season, this time to Ulster. After another poor first half performance, Connacht went in 17–0 down, only to earn a losing bonus with a final score of 20–27. Another home defeat followed, with the team shipping five tries against Glasgow Warriors in a 13–31 defeat, leaving the team in danger of finishing behind Edinburgh in 8th place and missing not only automatic qualification for the Champions Cup, but also the chance at a play-off for the final spot.

=== May ===
Connacht were able to start the month with their first win since 1 March, beating Zebre 10–40 in Italy, to earn a try bonus and leave themselves with a chance of reaching the Champions Cup. In the final round of the regular season, on 16 May, Connacht faced Ospreys, while their rivals for the Champions Cup places, Scarlets and Edinburgh, faced Benetton Treviso and Leinster respectively. Connacht picked up a losing bonus, while Scarlets won and Edinburgh were beaten by 13, leaving Connacht in 7th place, their highest finish in a regular league season, but just short of qualification to the Champions Cup.

Connacht proceeded to a play-off involving Bordeaux Bègles, the 7th placed team in the 2014–15 Top 14 season, and Gloucester the 2014–15 Rugby Challenge Cup winners. Connacht played Gloucester away on 24 May for the chance to face Bordeaux. Connacht were leading 18–25 in the final minutes of the game, but a controversial penalty decision from Romain Poite gave Gloucester a try-scoring opportunity and sent the match to extra time, after which Gloucester emerged 40–32 victors.

== Coaching and Management Team ==
| Role | Name | Nationality |
|---|---|---|
| Head coach | Pat Lam | Samoa (Note: New Zealand-born and qualified for Samoa, Lam has represented both countries, but last played rugby for Samoa.) |
| Assistant coach | Dan McFarland | England |
| Backs/Kicking Coach | Andre Bell | New Zealand |
| Skills Coach | Dave Ellis | New Zealand |
| Chief executive | Willie Ruane | Ireland |
| Team manager | Tim Allnut | New Zealand |
| Academy manager/ Eagles Head Coach | Nigel Carolan | Ireland |
| Resource Coach(es) | Cory Browne; Jimmy Duffy | New Zealand; Ireland |
| Head of Fitness | Paul Bunce | New Zealand |
| Performance analyst | Conor McPhillips | Ireland |
| Head physio | Gavin Malouf | Australia |

== Players ==
=== Senior Playing Squad ===
Note: Flags indicate national union under World Rugby eligibility rules. Players may hold more than one non-World Rugby nationality.

| Player | Position | Union |
|---|---|---|
| Jason Harris-Wright | Hooker | Ireland |
| David Heffernan | Hooker | Ireland |
| Seán Henry | Hooker | Ireland |
| Tom McCartney | Hooker | New Zealand |
| **Rodney Ah You** | Prop | Ireland |
| Finlay Bealham | Prop | Ireland |
| Denis Buckley | Prop | Ireland |
| JP Cooney | Prop | Ireland |
| **Ronan Loughney** | Prop | Ireland |
| Nathan White* | Prop | New Zealand |
| Mick Kearney | Lock | Ireland |
| Aly Muldowney* | Lock | England |
| Danny Qualter | Lock | Ireland |
| Quinn Roux | Lock | South Africa |
| Michael Swift* | Lock | England |
| Andrew Browne | Flanker | Ireland |
| Mata Fafita* | Flanker | Tonga |
| Willie Faloon | Flanker | Ireland |
| Jake Heenan | Flanker | New Zealand |
| **John Muldoon** (c) | Flanker | Ireland |
| Eoin McKeon | Number 8 | Ireland |
| George Naoupu | Number 8 | New Zealand |

| Player | Position | Union |
|---|---|---|
| John Cooney | Scrum-half | Ireland |
| **Kieran Marmion** | Scrum-half | Ireland |
| Ian Porter | Scrum-half | Ireland |
| Jack Carty | Fly-half | Ireland |
| Miah Nikora* | Fly-half | New Zealand |
| Craig Ronaldson | Fly-half | Ireland |
| Bundee Aki | Centre | New Zealand |
| Conor Finn | Centre | Ireland |
| **Robbie Henshaw** | Centre | Ireland |
| Dave McSharry | Centre | Ireland |
| Shane O'Leary* | Centre | Canada |
| Niyi Adeolokun* | Wing | Nigeria |
| Fionn Carr | Wing | Ireland |
| Matt Healy | Wing | Ireland |
| Tiernan O'Halloran | Wing | Ireland |
| Danie Poolman | Wing | South Africa |
| Shane Layden | Fullback | Ireland |
| Darragh Leader | Fullback | Ireland |
| **Mils Muliaina** | Fullback | New Zealand |

- Players qualified to play for Ireland on dual nationality or residency grounds*
- Senior 15's internationally capped players in **bold**

=== Academy squad ===
Note: Flags indicate national union under World Rugby eligibility rules. Players may hold more than one non-World Rugby nationality.

| Player | Position | Union |
|---|---|---|
| Shane Delahunt | Hooker | Ireland year 1 |
| Jack Dineen | Hooker | Ireland year 1 |
| Jamie Dever | Prop | Ireland year 2 |
| Saba Meunargia | Prop | Ireland year 2 |
| Jacob Walshe | Prop | Ireland year 2 |
| Ultan Dillane | Lock | Ireland year 3 |
| Seán O'Brien | Lock | Ireland year 2 |
| James Connolly | Flanker | Ireland year 2 |
| Marc Kelly | Flanker | Ireland year 1 |
| Rory Moloney | Flanker | Ireland year 2 |
| Eoghan Masterson | Number 8 | Scotland year 2 |

| Player | Position | Union |
|---|---|---|
| Caolin Blade | Scrum-half | Ireland year 2 |
| Conor McKeon | Outside-half | Ireland year 1 |
| Rory Parata | Centre | Ireland year 2 |
| Peter Robb | Centre | Ireland year 1 |
| Ciaran Gaffney | Wing | Ireland year 1 |
| David Panter | Fullback | England year 2 |

== Preseason transfers ==
=== Players in ===
- HK (New Zealand) Tom McCartney from (New Zealand) Blues
- PR (Ireland) Finlay Bealham promoted from academy
- LK (South Africa) Quinn Roux from (Ireland) Leinster (loan)
- SH (Ireland) John Cooney from (Ireland) Leinster (loan)
- SH (Ireland) Ian Porter from (Ireland) Ulster
- FH (Ireland) Jack Carty promoted from academy
- CE (New Zealand) Bundee Aki from (New Zealand) Chiefs
- CE (Ireland) Conor Finn promoted from academy
- CE (Canada) Shane O'Leary from (France) Grenoble
- WG (Nigeria) Niyi Adeolokun from (Ireland) Dublin University
- FB (Ireland) Shane Layden promoted from academy
- FB (Ireland) Darragh Leader promoted from academy
- FB (New Zealand) Mils Muliaina from (New Zealand) Chiefs

=== Players out ===
- HK (Ireland) James Rael to (Ireland) Lansdowne
- PR (Ireland) Brett Wilkinson retired
- LK (New Zealand) Craig Clarke retired
- LK (Ireland) Dave Nolan to (France) Bourgoin
- FL (Ireland) Aaron Conneely to (Ireland) Lansdowne
- SH (Ireland) Frank Murphy retired
- SH (Ireland) Paul O'Donohoe retired
- FH (Scotland) Dan Parks retired
- CE (Ireland) Eoin Griffin to (England) London Irish
- CE (Ireland) Brian Murphy to (Ireland) Galwegians
- CE (Ireland) Kyle Tonetti retired
- FB (Ireland) Gavin Duffy to (Republic of Ireland) Mayo Football

== Playing kit ==
Connacht's official kit supplier for the season was Australian manufacturer BLK sport, who announced a comprehensive four-year agreement to supply the full range of apparel for all of Connacht Rugby's representative teams and support staff in 2013.

Connacht's main shirt sponsors were Irish sporting retailer Lifestyle Sports. Lifestyle Sports signed a four-season deal with the province, to will see their logo feature on the jersey until the end of the 2017–18 season, taking over from the previous season's sponsors Mazda Ireland.

== Results ==
=== Pro12 ===
Pro12 Table
| | Team | Played | Won | Drawn | Lost | Points For | Points Against | Points Difference | Tries For | Tries Against | Try Bonus | Losing Bonus | Points |
| 1 | (Scotland) Glasgow Warriors (CH) | 22 | 16 | 1 | 5 | 540 | 360 | +180 | 63 | 33 | 9 | 0 | 75 |
| 2 | (Ireland) Munster (RU) | 22 | 15 | 2 | 5 | 581 | 367 | +214 | 68 | 31 | 8 | 3 | 75 |
| 3 | (Wales) Ospreys (SF) | 22 | 16 | 1 | 5 | 546 | 358 | +188 | 53 | 30 | 6 | 2 | 74 |
| 4 | (Ireland) Ulster (SF) | 22 | 14 | 2 | 6 | 524 | 372 | +152 | 59 | 34 | 6 | 3 | 69 |
| 5 | (Ireland) Leinster | 22 | 11 | 3 | 8 | 483 | 375 | +108 | 54 | 39 | 8 | 4 | 62 |
| 6 | (Wales) Scarlets | 22 | 11 | 3 | 8 | 452 | 388 | +64 | 43 | 39 | 4 | 3 | 57 |
| 7 | (Ireland) Connacht | 22 | 10 | 1 | 11 | 447 | 419 | +28 | 49 | 48 | 3 | 5 | 50 |
| 8 | (Scotland) Edinburgh | 22 | 10 | 1 | 11 | 399 | 419 | −20 | 41 | 48 | 3 | 3 | 48 |
| 9 | (Wales) Newport Gwent Dragons | 22 | 8 | 0 | 14 | 393 | 484 | −91 | 38 | 55 | 4 | 6 | 42 |
| 10 | (Wales) Cardiff Blues | 22 | 7 | 1 | 14 | 430 | 545 | −115 | 46 | 57 | 3 | 2 | 35 |
| 11 | (Italy) Benetton Treviso | 22 | 3 | 1 | 18 | 306 | 641 | −335 | 34 | 81 | 2 | 3 | 19 |
| 12 | (Italy) Zebre | 22 | 3 | 0 | 19 | 266 | 639 | −373 | 27 | 80 | 0 | 3 | 15 |
If teams are level at any stage, tiebreakers are applied in the following order: 1. number of matches won; 2. the difference between points for and points against; 3. the number of tries scored; 4. the most points scored; 5. the difference between tries for and tries against; 6. the fewest red cards received; 7. the fewest yellow cards received.
Green background (rows 1 to 4) are play-off places, and earn a place in the 2015–16 European Rugby Champions Cup. Blue background indicates teams outside the play-off places, that earn a place in the European Rugby Champions Cup. The top team from each country will qualify. Yellow background indicates the team that advances to a play-off semi-final against Aviva Premiership side Gloucester, who qualified for the play-off as the 2014–15 European Rugby Challenge Cup winners. Plain background indicates teams that earn a place in the 2015–16 European Rugby Challenge Cup.

6 September 2014
17:00

| Connacht (Ireland) | 16–11 | (Wales) Newport Gwent Dragons (1 BP) |
| Try: E. McKeon 9' m Poolman 54' m Pen: Leader (2/3) 15', 51' | Report | Try: Cudd 23' m Pen: Tovey (2/3) 30', 75' |

Galway Sportsgrounds
Attendance: 4,123
Referee: Marius Mitrea (FIR)

12 September 2014
19:35

| (1 BP) Edinburgh (Scotland) | 13–14 | (Ireland) Connacht |
| Try: du Preez 40' c Con: Heathcote (1/1); Pen: Heathcote (2/3) 3', 9' | Report | Try: Faloon 75' m Pen: Leader (3/5) 23', 37', 55' |

Murrayfield Stadium
Attendance: 3,777
Referee: Gary Conway (IRFU)

19 September 2014
19:35

| Connacht (Ireland) | 10–9 | (Ireland) Leinster (1 BP) |
| Try: Marmion 54' c Con: Carty (1/1); Pen: Carty (1/2) 21' | Report | Pen: Madigan (3/4) 2', 11', 15' |

Galway Sportsgrounds
Attendance: 5,917
Referee: John Lacey (IRFU)

26 September 2014
19:35

| (1 BP) Glasgow Warriors (Scotland) | 39–21 | (Ireland) Connacht |
| Try: Hogg (2) 19' c, 46' m Pyrgos 36' c Van der Merwe 61' c Bennett 74' c Con: Weir (4/5); Pen: Weir (2/2) 30', 71' | Report | Try: McSharry 23' c Leader 56' c Penalty try 68' c Con: Porter (3/3) |

Scotstoun Stadium
Attendance: 5,821
Referee: Claudio Blessano (FIR)

3 October 2014
19:35

| Connacht (Ireland) | 24–24 | (Wales) Cardiff Blues |
| Try: Henshaw 31' c Marmion 42' c White 46' c Con: Ronaldson (3/3); Pen: Ronaldson (1/1) 6' | Report | Try: A. Thomas 19' c Cook 69' c Andrews 78' c Con: Patchell (3/3); Pen: Patchell (1/1) 36' |

Galway Sportsgrounds
Attendance: 5,247
Referee: Neil Paterson (SRU)

10 October 2014
20:00

| (1 BP) Benetton Treviso (Italy) | 6–9 | (Ireland) Connacht |
| Pen: Hayward (2/3) 6', 38' | Report | Pen: Ronaldson (3/5) 17', 30', 67' |

Stadio Comunale di Monigo
Attendance: 3,025
Referee: David Wilkinson (IRFU)

31 October 2014
19:35

| Ospreys (Wales) | 26–11 | (Ireland) Connacht |
| Try: Hassler 48' c Roberts 61' c Con: Davies (2/2); Pen: Davies (4/6) 4', 51', 56', 66' | Report | Try: E. McKeon 77' m Pen: Ronaldson (2/5) 36', 46' |

Liberty Stadium
Attendance: 6,010
Referee: John Lacey (IRFU)

21 November 2014
19:35

| (1 BP) Connacht (Ireland) | 43–3 | (Italy) Zebre |
| Try: Poolman 27' m Kearney 46' c Penalty try 61' c Jo. Cooney 65' m Carty 68' c Con: Porter (1/2); Nikora (1/1); Carty (1/2); Pen: Porter (4/6) 13', 19', 34', 38' | Report | Pen: Odiete (1/2) 17' |

Galway Sportsgrounds
Attendance: 5,486
Referee: Ben Whitehouse (WRU)

29 November 2014
19:30

| Connacht (Ireland) | 14–8 | (Wales) Scarlets (1 BP) |
| Try: Healy 48' m Pen: Carty (3/4) 19', 47', 63' | Report | Try: Robinson 3' m Pen: S. Shingler (1/2) 1' |

Galway Sportsgrounds
Attendance: 5,631
Referee: Leighton Hodges (WRU)

19 December 2014
19:35

| Leinster (Ireland) | 21–11 | (Ireland) Connacht |
| Try: Jennings 12' m Kirchner 78' c Con: Gopperth (1/2); Pen: Gopperth (3/3) 16', 41', 49' | Report | Try: Naoupu 73' m Pen: Carty (2/3) 31', 40' |

RDS Arena
Attendance: 16,007
Referee: Ian Davies (WRU)

26 December 2014
18:45

| Ulster (Ireland) | 13–10 | (Ireland) Connacht (1 BP) |
| Try: Gilroy 19' c Con: Jackson (1/1); Pen: Jackson (2/4) 14', 62' | Report | Try: Muldowney 66' c Con: Carty (1/1); Pen: Carty (1/1) 4' |

Kingspan Stadium
Attendance: 17,107
Referee: John Lacey (IRFU)

1 January 2015
17:00

| Connacht (Ireland) | 24–16 | (Ireland) Munster |
| Try: Marmion 29' c Ronaldson 42' c Muldowney 60' c Con: Ronaldson (1/1); Leader (2/2); Pen: Nikora (1/1) 55' | Report | Try: P. O'Mahony 10' c Con: Keatley (1/1); Pen: Keatley (3/3) 7', 15', 38' |

Galway Sportsgrounds
Attendance: 7,745
Referee: David Wilkinson (IRFU)

9 January 2015
19:35

| (1 BP) Connacht (Ireland) | 13–16 | (Scotland) Edinburgh |
| Try: Penalty try 37' c Con: Nikora (1/1); Pen: Nikora (2/3) 23', 40' | Report | Try: Denton 16' c Con: Hidalgo-Clyne (1/1); Pen: Hidalgo-Clyne (3/4) 44', 49', 70' |

Galway Sportsgrounds
Attendance: 5,267
Referee: Leighton Hodges (WRU)

15 February 2015
12:45

| (1 BP) Scarlets (Wales) | 32–14 | (Ireland) Connacht |
| Try: Tagicakibau 23' m Robinson 27' c J. Williams 33' c J. Davies 50' c Con: S. Shingler (3/4); Pen: S. Shingler (2/2) 13', 17' | Report | Try: Adeolokun 72' m Pen: Carty (3/3) 4', 39', 47' |

Parc y Scarlets
Attendance: 5,000
Referee: Marius Mitrea (FIR)

22 February 2015
16:00

| (1 BP) Newport Gwent Dragons (Wales) | 25–30 | (Ireland) Connacht |
| Try: Amos (2) 32' m, 80' c Dixon 65' c Con: Prydie (2/3); Pen: Prydie (2/2) 4', 39' | Report | Try: Ronaldson 7' c Masterson 22' c Kearney 75' c Con: Carty (2/2); Leader (1/1); Pen: Carty (1/3) 11'; Leader (2/2) 57', 60' |

Rodney Parade
Attendance: 4,180
Referee: Lloyd Linton (SRU)

1 March 2015
17:15

| (1 BP) Connacht (Ireland) | 53–5 | (Italy) Benetton Treviso |
| Try: O'Halloran 5' c Heenan 45' c Healy (2) 51' c, 72' c Buckley 54' c Muldowney 67' m Poolman 79' c Con: Ronaldson (6/7); Pen: Ronaldson (2/2) 14', 31' | Report | Try: Christie 34' m |

Galway Sportsgrounds
Attendance: 3,880
Referee: Andrew McMenemy (SRU)

6 March 2015
19:35

| Cardiff Blues (Wales) | 18–17 | (Ireland) Connacht (1 BP) |
| Try: Tuculet (2) 56' m, 80' c Con: Patchell (1/2); Pen: Patchell (2/2) 24', 64' | Report | Try: Heenan 5' c Muldowney 70' c Con: Ronaldson (2/2); Pen: Ronaldson (1/1) 22' |

Cardiff Arms Park
Attendance: 5,624
Referee: Lloyd Linton (SRU)

28 March 2015
17:15

| (1 BP) Munster (Ireland) | 42–20 | (Ireland) Connacht |
| Try: B. Holland 12' c Casey 55' c Zebo 63' c Smith 72' c Hurley 74' c Earls 79' c Con: Keatley (3/3); Hanrahan (3/3) | Report | Try: Nikora 68' c O'Leary 78' c Con: Nikora (2/2); Pen: Carty (2/3) 1', 45' |

Thomond Park
Attendance: 18,762
Referee: Leighton Hodges (WRU)

11 April 2015
14:40

| (1 BP) Connacht (Ireland) | 20–27 | (Ireland) Ulster (1 BP) |
| Try: Healy 44' c O'Halloran 70' c Con: Nikora (1/1); Carty (1/1); Pen: Nikora (1/1) 51'; Carty (1/1) 62' | Report | Try: Ludik 4' m Bowe (2) 31' m, 56' m Gilroy 34' c Best 64' m Con: Pienaar (1/5) |

Galway Sportsgrounds
Attendance: 5,921
Referee: Nigel Owens (WRU)

25 April 2015
13:05

| Connacht (Ireland) | 13–31 | (Scotland) Glasgow Warriors (1 BP) |
| Try: Muldowney 53' c Con: Carty (1/1); Pen: Carty (2/5) 6', 16' | Report | Try: Matawalu (2) 24' m, 38' c Hogg 35' c Ashe 67' c Seymour 73' m Con: Russell (3/5) |

Galway Sportsgrounds
Attendance: 4,430
Referee: Marius Mitrea (FIR)

9 May 2015
18:30

| Zebre (Italy) | 10–40 | (Ireland) Connacht (1 BP) |
| Try: Leonard 26' c Con: Orquera (1/1); Pen: Orquera (1/1) 34' | Report | Try: Jo. Cooney (2) 11' c, 35' c Healy 29' c Masterson 54' m O'Halloran 70' c O'Leary 73' c Con: Carty (3/4); C. McKeon (2/2) |

Stadio Sergio Lanfranchi
Attendance: 2,680
Referee: Ian Davies (WRU)

16 May 2015
15:00

| (1 BP) Connacht (Ireland) | 20–24 | (Wales) Ospreys |
| Try: Masterson 53' c Buckley 80' c Con: Carty (2/2); Pen: Carty (2/2) 41', 49' | Report | Try: Biggar 15' c John 25' c Webb 27' c Con: Biggar (3/3); Pen: Biggar (1/1) 5' |

Galway Sportsgrounds
Attendance: 5,226
Referee: Marius Mitrea (FIR)

=== Rugby Challenge Cup ===
==== Pool 2 ====
| Pos | Team | Pld | W | D | L | PF | PA | PD | TF | TA | TB | LB | Pts |
|---|---|---|---|---|---|---|---|---|---|---|---|---|---|
| 1 | (England) Exeter Chiefs (2) | 6 | 5 | 0 | 1 | 212 | 97 | +115 | 26 | 11 | 4 | 1 | 25 |
| 2 | (Ireland) Connacht (8) | 6 | 4 | 0 | 2 | 186 | 144 | +42 | 23 | 16 | 4 | 0 | 20 |
| 3 | (France) Bayonne | 6 | 2 | 0 | 4 | 106 | 165 | −59 | 10 | 18 | 0 | 1 | 9 |
| 4 | (France) La Rochelle | 6 | 1 | 0 | 5 | 84 | 182 | −98 | 10 | 24 | 0 | 0 | 4 |

Source: espn.co.uk

18 October 2014
17:00

| (1 BP) Connacht (Ireland) | 48–12 | (France) La Rochelle |
| Try: Carty 5' c Marmion 9' m Henshaw (2) 31' c, 45' c Loughney 35' c Poolman 52' m Healy 64' c Con: Ronaldson (4/5) 5', 32', 37', 46'; Porter (1/2) 65'; Pen: Ronaldson (1/1) 15' | Report | Try: Cler 42' m Bouldoire 69' c Con: Le Bail (1/2) 70' |

Galway Sportsgrounds, Galway
Attendance: 4,735
Referee: Andrew McMenemy (Scotland)

25 October 2014
15:00

| (1 BP) Exeter Chiefs (England) | 33–13 | (Ireland) Connacht |
| Try: Chudley 9' c Slade 20' m Welch 40' c Ewers 46' c White 56' c Con: Steenson (4/5) 9', 40', 47', 57' | Report | Try: Carr 73' c Con: Ronaldson (1/1) 74'; Pen: Ronaldson (2/2) 5', 37' |

Sandy Park, Exeter
Attendance: 8,484
Referee: Mathieu Raynal (France)

6 December 2014
17:00

| (1 BP) Connacht (Ireland) | 42–19 | (France) Bayonne |
| Try: Poolman (2) 19' c, 39' m Aki 60' c McSharry 69' c Faloon 72' c Con: Carty (3/4) 20', 61', 70'; Ronaldson (1/1) 73'; Pen: Carty (3/4) 11', 53', 59' | Report | Try: Lapeyrade 45' c Con: Otazo (1/1) 46'; Pen: Bustos Moyano (4/5) 5', 14', 16', 29' |

Galway Sportsgrounds, Galway
Attendance: 4,425
Referee: Matthew Carley (England)

13 December 2014
20:45

| Bayonne (France) | 27–29 | (Ireland) Connacht |
| Try: Vaka 3' c Ugalde 17' c Sayerse 41' c Con: Loustalot (3/3) 3', 18', 42'; Pen: Loustalot (2/2) 34', 50' | Report | Try: Blade (2) 27' c, 77' c Con: Nikora (2/2) 28', 78'; Pen: Nikora (5/6) 6', 30', 37', 57', 67' |

Stade Jean Dauger, Bayonne
Attendance: 4,980
Referee: Ian Davies (Wales)

18 January 2015
15:15

| (1 BP) Connacht (Ireland) | 24–33 | (England) Exeter Chiefs |
| Try: Healy (2) 5' m, 74' c Faloon 23' m Poolman 38' c Con: Carty (2/4) 39', 75' | Report | Try: Penalty try 19' c Mumm 45' c Armand 62' c Con: Slade (3/3) 20', 46', 63'; Pen: Slade (4/5) 35', 43', 57', 70' |

Galway Sportsgrounds, Galway
Attendance: 5,088
Referee: Alexandre Ruiz (France)

24 January 2015
18:30

| La Rochelle (France) | 20–30 | (Ireland) Connacht (1 BP) |
| Try: Penalty try 32' c, Meron 38' c Con: Barraque (2/2) 33', 39'; Pen: Barraque (2/2) 9', 23' | Report | Try: Marmion 2' m McKeon 46' m Adeolokun 74' c Healy 76' c Con: Carty (2/4) 75', 78'; Pen: Carty (2/3) 16', 37' |

Stade Marcel-Deflandre, La Rochelle
Attendance: 10,068
Referee: Neil Paterson (Scotland)

==== Quarter-finals ====
3 April 2015
19:45

| Gloucester (England) | 14–7 | (Ireland) Connacht |
| Try: Sharples 20' c Meakes 30' c Con: Laidlaw (2/2) 21', 31' | Report | Try: Penalty try 65' c Con: Carty (1/1) 66' |

Kingsholm Stadium
Attendance: 13,236
Referee: Mathieu Raynal (FFR)

=== Champions Cup play-offs ===
==== Match 1 ====
24 May 2015
15:30 GMT

| Gloucester (England) | 40−32 (a.e.t.) | (Ireland) Connacht |
| Try: Moriarty 1' c Sharples 26' m Meakes 80' c Dawidiuk 95' m May 98' c Con: Laidlaw (3/5) 1', 80', 98'; Pen: Laidlaw (2/3) 19', 43'; Hook (1/1) 92' | Report | Try: J. Cooney 8' c Carty 29' c Healy (2) 60' m, 92' c Con: Carty (3/4) 9', 30', 92'; Pen: Carty (2/3) 7', 79' |

Kingsholm Stadium, Gloucester
Attendance: 7,633
Referee: Romain Poite (FFR)

| FB | 15 | (England) Charlie Sharples | | (substituted off) 64' |
| RW | 14 | (England) Jonny May |
| OC | 13 | (Australia) Bill Meakes |
| IC | 12 | (England) Billy Twelvetrees (c) |
| LW | 11 | (England) Henry Purdy | | (substituted off) 50' |
| FH | 10 | (Wales) James Hook |
| SH | 9 | (Scotland) Greig Laidlaw |
| N8 | 8 | (England) Ross Moriarty | | (substituted off) 71' | | | (substituted on) 88' |
| OF | 7 | (Wales) Dan Thomas | | (substituted off) 33' | (substituted on) 44' | (substituted off) 65' |
| BF | 6 | (England) Jacob Rowan |
| RL | 5 | (England) Tom Palmer |
| LL | 4 | (England) Tom Savage |
| TP | 3 | (New Zealand) John Afoa | (yellow card) 33' to 43' | | | (substituted off) 88' |
| HK | 2 | (Wales) Richard Hibbard | | (substituted off) 59' |
| LP | 1 | (England) Nick Wood | | (substituted off) 65' |
Replacements:
| HK | 16 | (England) Darren Dawidiuk | | (substituted on) 59' |
| PR | 17 | (England) Yann Thomas | | (substituted on) 65' |
| PR | 18 | (England) Shaun Knight | | (substituted on) 33' | (substituted off) 44' | (substituted on) 88' |
| LK | 19 | (England) Elliott Stooke | | (substituted on) 71' |
| FL | 20 | (England) Lewis Ludlow | | | | (substituted on) 65' | (substituted off) 88' |
| SH | 21 | (England) Dan Robson | | (substituted on) 64' |
| FH | 22 | (England) Billy Burns |
| FB | 23 | (England) Rob Cook | | (substituted on) 50' |
Coach:
(Ireland) David Humphreys

| FB | 15 | (Ireland) Tiernan O'Halloran | | (substituted off) 65' |
| RW | 14 | (Ireland) Fionn Carr | | (substituted off) 75' |
| OC | 13 | (Ireland) Robbie Henshaw |
| IC | 12 | (New Zealand) Bundee Aki |
| LW | 11 | (Ireland) Matt Healy |
| FH | 10 | (Ireland) Jack Carty |
| SH | 9 | (Ireland) John Cooney | | (substituted off) 64' |
| N8 | 8 | (Ireland) Eoin McKeon | | (substituted off) 71' |
| OF | 7 | (Scotland) Eoghan Masterson | (yellow card) 55' to 65' | (substituted off) 33' | (substituted on) 44' |
| BF | 6 | (Ireland) John Muldoon (c) |
| RL | 5 | (England) Aly Muldowney |
| LL | 4 | (New Zealand) George Naoupu | | (substituted off) 54' |
| TP | 3 | (Ireland) Rodney Ah You | | (substituted off) 54' |
| HK | 2 | (New Zealand) Tom McCartney | | (substituted off) 70' | (substituted on) 79' | (substituted off) 90' |
| LP | 1 | (Ireland) Denis Buckley | (yellow card) 33' to 43' |
Replacements:
| HK | 16 | (Ireland) Dave Heffernan | (yellow card) 94' to 100' | (substituted on) 70' | 79' to 90' |
| PR | 17 | (Ireland) JP Cooney | | (substituted on) 33' | (substituted off) 44' |
| PR | 18 | (Ireland) Finlay Bealham | | (substituted on) 54' |
| LK | 19 | (Ireland) Andrew Browne | | (substituted on) 54' |
| FL | 20 | (Ireland) James Connolly | | (substituted on) 71' |
| SH | 21 | (Ireland) Ian Porter | | (substituted on) 64' |
| FH | 22 | (New Zealand) Miah Nikora | | (substituted on) 75' |
| CE | 23 | (Canada) Shane O'Leary | | (substituted on) 65' |
Coach:
(Samoa) Pat Lam

== Awards and recognition ==
At the end of the 2014–15 Pro12 season, an Awards evening was held in the Guinness Storehouse in Dublin, with Connacht among those honoured both as a team and for individual performance.

| Award | Recipient |
|---|---|
| Pro12 Fair Play award | Connacht |
| Pro12 Dream Team | Denis Buckley |
| Pro12 Dream Team | Robbie Henshaw |

Connacht held their own awards ceremony in May, to acknowledge the services of individual players.

| Award | Recipient |
|---|---|
| Players' Player of the Year | Robbie Henshaw |
| Fans' Player of the Year | Robbie Henshaw |
| Back of the Year | Matt Healy |
| Forward of the Year | Denis Buckley |
| Team Man of the Year | Aly Muldowney |
| Academy Player of the Year | Eoghan Masterson |
| Try of the Year | Kieran Marmion, v Leinster, September 2014 |

Connacht also had awards throughout the season for the Player of the Month, as voted by the team's supporters.

| Month | Award Winner |
|---|---|
| September 2014 | Denis Buckley |
| October 2014 | George Naoupu |
| November 2014 | Matt Healy |
| December 2014 | Tom McCartney |
| January 2015 | Matt Healy |
| February 2015 | Aly Muldowney |
| March 2015 | Eoghan Masterson |
| April 2015 | Rodney Ah You |
