= 2015–16 European Rugby Champions–Challenge Cup play-offs =

- Event: European Rugby Champions Cup Qualification Play-off
- Date: 23 and 30 May 2015

The 2015–16 European Rugby Champions Cup-Challenge Cup play-off was the second play-off for entry into the top-level competition of European Club rugby union, the European Rugby Champions Cup.

== Format ==
Following the two-team play-off in 2014–15, an expanded, four-team format was due to be used. However, on 24 September 2014, it was announced this would instead be a three-team play-off, with the highest placed non-qualifying team taking part.

To accommodate the longer season in the French Top 14, the format was announced as follows:

- One team each would qualify from the Premiership and the Pro12, with each league being represented by the highest placed team not already qualified. These two teams would play in the first game, with home advantage in the match would be decided by a coin toss. In the event that the 2014–15 European Rugby Challenge Cup winner was a Premiership club, and it had not automatically qualified for the Champions Cup, it would take the place allocated to a Premiership team.
- The winner of the first game would host the 7th placed team in the French Top 14. The winner of that game would qualify for the Champions Cup.

Gloucester became the first team to qualify for the play-off, taking the place allocated to the Premiership, when they beat Edinburgh 19–13 in the Challenge Cup final on 1 May 2015. This result meant that the 7th place team in the 2014–15 Premiership will no longer take part in the play-off, and will compete in the Challenge Cup. Connacht qualified next, when the finished seventh in the 2014–15 Pro12 with 50 points, narrowly edging Edinburgh who had 48 points. Bordeaux Bègles qualified for the play-off on 23 May 2015.

Connacht played Gloucester away at Gloucester's Kingsholm Stadium on Sunday 24 May 2015, with the venue having been decided earlier by a coin toss. It was decided that, in the event of a Gloucester win, the second play-off match would be played at Sixways Stadium in Worcester, to avoid a clash of fixtures with a Madness concert.

== Teams ==
League	Team	Coach	Stadium
Premiership	Gloucester	(Ireland) David Humphreys	Kingsholm Stadium
Pro12	Connacht	(Samoa) Pat Lam	Galway Sportsgrounds
Top 14	Bordeaux Bègles	(France) Raphaël Ibañez	Stade André Moga

== Matches ==
=== Match 1 ===
24 May 2015
15:30 GMT

Gloucester (England)	40−32 (a.e.t.)	(Ireland) Connacht
Try: Moriarty 1' c Sharples 26' m Meakes 80' c Dawidiuk 95' m May 98' c Con: Laidlaw (3/5) 1', 80', 98'; Pen: Laidlaw (2/3) 19', 43'; Hook (1/1) 92'	Report	Try: J. Cooney 8' c Carty 29' c Healy (2) 60' m, 92' c Con: Carty (3/4) 9', 30', 92'; Pen: Carty (2/3) 7', 79'

Kingsholm Stadium, Gloucester
Attendance: 7,633
Referee: Romain Poite (FFR)

FB	15	(England) Charlie Sharples		(substituted off) 64'
RW	14	(England) Jonny May
OC	13	(Australia) Bill Meakes
IC	12	(England) Billy Twelvetrees (c)
LW	11	(England) Henry Purdy		(substituted off) 50'
FH	10	(Wales) James Hook
SH	9	(Scotland) Greig Laidlaw
N8	8	(Wales) Ross Moriarty		(substituted off) 71'			(substituted in) 88'
OF	7	(Wales) Dan Thomas		(substituted off) 33'	(substituted in) 44'	(substituted off) 65'
BF	6	(England) Jacob Rowan
RL	5	(England) Tom Palmer
LL	4	(England) Tom Savage
TP	3	(New Zealand) John Afoa	(yellow card) 33' to 43'			(substituted off) 88'
HK	2	(Wales) Richard Hibbard		(substituted off) 59'
LP	1	(England) Nick Wood		(substituted off) 65'
Replacements:
HK	16	(England) Darren Dawidiuk		(substituted in) 59'
PR	17	(England) Yann Thomas		(substituted in) 65'
PR	18	(England) Shaun Knight		(substituted in) 33'	(substituted off) 44'	(substituted in) 88'
LK	19	(England) Elliott Stooke		(substituted in) 71'
FL	20	(England) Lewis Ludlow				(substituted in) 65'	(substituted off) 88'
SH	21	(England) Dan Robson		(substituted in) 64'
FH	22	(England) Billy Burns
FB	23	(England) Rob Cook		(substituted in) 50'
Coach:
(Ireland) David Humphreys

FB	15	(Ireland) Tiernan O'Halloran		(substituted off) 65'
RW	14	(Ireland) Fionn Carr		(substituted off) 75'
OC	13	(Ireland) Robbie Henshaw
IC	12	(New Zealand) Bundee Aki
LW	11	(Ireland) Matt Healy
FH	10	(Ireland) Jack Carty
SH	9	(Ireland) John Cooney		(substituted off) 64'
N8	8	(Ireland) Eoin McKeon		(substituted off) 71'
OF	7	(Scotland) Eoghan Masterson	(yellow card) 55' to 65'	(substituted off) 33'	(substituted in) 44'
BF	6	(Ireland) John Muldoon (c)
RL	5	(England) Aly Muldowney
LL	4	(New Zealand) George Naoupu		(substituted off) 54'
TP	3	(Ireland) Rodney Ah You		(substituted off) 54'
HK	2	(New Zealand) Tom McCartney		(substituted off) 70'	(substituted in) 79'	(substituted off) 90'
LP	1	(Ireland) Denis Buckley	(yellow card) 33' to 43'
Replacements:
HK	16	(Ireland) Dave Heffernan	(yellow card) 94' to 100'	(substituted in) 70'	79' to 90'
PR	17	(Ireland) JP Cooney		(substituted in) 33'	(substituted off) 44'
PR	18	(Ireland) Finlay Bealham		(substituted in) 54'
LK	19	(Ireland) Andrew Browne		(substituted in) 54'
FL	20	(Ireland) James Connolly		(substituted in) 71'
SH	21	(Ireland) Ian Porter		(substituted in) 64'
FH	22	(New Zealand) Miah Nikora		(substituted in) 75'
CE	23	(Canada) Shane O'Leary		(substituted in) 65'
Coach:
(Samoa) Pat Lam

- Gloucester advanced to play Bordeaux Bègles. Connacht went on to compete in the 2015–16 European Rugby Challenge Cup.

=== Match 2 ===
31 May 2015
17:00 GMT

Gloucester (England)	22−23	(France) Bordeaux Bègles
Try: Purdy 15' c Con: Laidlaw (1/1) 16'; Pen: Laidlaw (5/6) 2', 10', 24', 32', 70'	Report	Try: Talebula (2) 37' c, 56' c Con: Bernard (2/2) 39', 58'; Pen: Bernard (2/2) 28', 35'; Drop: Bernard (1/1) 80'

Sixways Stadium, Worcester
Attendance: 5,447
Referee: Leighton Hodges (WRU)

FB	15	(England) Rob Cook
RW	14	(England) Charlie Sharples
OC	13	(Australia) Bill Meakes		(substituted off) 66'
IC	12	(England) Billy Twelvetrees (c)
LW	11	(England) Henry Purdy
FH	10	(Wales) James Hook
SH	9	(Scotland) Greig Laidlaw
N8	8	(Wales) Ross Moriarty
OF	7	(England) Jacob Rowan		(substituted off) 58'
BF	6	(Tonga) Sione Kalamafoni		(substituted off) 45'	(substituted in) 56'	(substituted off) 71'
RL	5	(England) Tom Palmer
LL	4	(England) Tom Savage
TP	3	(New Zealand) John Afoa	(yellow card) 45' to 55'
HK	2	(Wales) Richard Hibbard		(substituted off) 59'
LP	1	(England) Nick Wood		(substituted off) 58'
Replacements:
HK	16	(England) Darren Dawidiuk		(substituted in) 59'
PR	17	(England) Yann Thomas		(substituted in) 58'
PR	18	(England) Shaun Knight		(substituted in) 45'	(substituted off) 56'
LK	19	(England) Elliott Stooke				(substituted in) 71'
N8	20	(England) Dan Thomas		(substituted in) 58'
SH	21	(England) Callum Braley
FH	22	(England) Billy Burns
FB	23	(Scotland) Steve McColl		(substituted in) 66'
Coach:
(Ireland) David Humphreys

FB	15	(France) Lionel Beauxis		(substituted off) 46'
RW	14	(Fiji) Metuisela Talebula
OC	13	(France) Félix Le Bourhis
IC	12	(France) Julien Rey
LW	11	(Australia) Blair Connor
FH	10	(France) Pierre Bernard
SH	9	(South Africa) Heini Adams		(substituted off) 56'
N8	8	(New Zealand) Peter Saili
OF	7	(New Zealand) Hugh Chalmers		(substituted off) 45'	(substituted in) 56'
BF	6	(France) Louis-Benoît Madaule (c)		(substituted off) 56'
RL	5	(South Africa) Berend Botha		(substituted off) 36'
LL	4	(South Africa) Jandré Marais
TP	3	(New Zealand) Patrick Toetu		(substituted off) 40'
HK	2	(Samoa) Ole Avei		(substituted off) 69'
LP	1	(France) Jefferson Poirot	(yellow card) 45' to 55'		(substituted off) 56'	(substituted in) 71'
Replacements:
HK	16	(France) Clément Maynadier		(substituted in) 69'
PR	17	(France) Jean-Baptiste Poux		(substituted in) 45'		(substituted off) 71'
PR	18	(Argentina) Francisco Gómez Kodela		(substituted in) 40'
LK	19	(France) Adam Jaulhac		(substituted in) 36'
N8	20	(New Zealand) Matthew Clarkin		(substituted in) 56'
SH	21	(France) Yann Lesgourgues		(substituted in) 56'
CE	22	(New Zealand) Jayden Spence
FB	23	(France) Baptiste Serin		(substituted in) 46'
Coach:
(France) Raphaël Ibañez

- Bordeaux Bègles qualified for the 2015–16 European Rugby Champions Cup. Gloucester played in the 2015–16 European Rugby Challenge Cup.

== See also ==
- 2015–16 European Rugby Champions Cup
- 2015–16 European Rugby Challenge Cup
