= Shane Layden =

Irish rugby union player (born 1992)

- Born: 9 September 1992 (age 34) Dublin, Ireland
- Height: 1.86 m (6 ft 1 in)
- Weight: 95 kg (14 st 13 lb)
- School: Cistercian College

Rugby union career
- Position(s): Fullback, Wing, Centre
- Current team: Ireland 7s
Amateur team(s)
Years	Team	Apps	(Points)
- Buccaneers
Senior career
Years	Team	Apps	(Points)
2014–2015	Connacht	4	(0)
- Correct as of 11 February 2015
International career
Years	Team	Apps	(Points)
2012	Ireland u20	5	(15)
2015–	Ireland 7s		
- Correct as of 11 Feb 2015

Shane Layden (born 9 September 1992) is a rugby union player from Ireland. He has played as a fullback, in the centre and on the wing. Layden previously played for the Irish sevens team and played professionally with provincial team Connacht Rugby in the Pro12. Layden plays his club rugby for Buccaneers.

== Youth ==
Layden is a graduate of Cistercian College in Roscrea. He also played Gaelic football at inter-county minor (under-18) level for Roscommon.

== Club ==
Layden joined the Connacht academy for the 2011–12 season. Layden had previously been part of a combined Connacht/Munster side that played against a Leinster/Ulster selection in an Under-20 match to open the Aviva Stadium in 2010. He was part of the Connacht team that won the Under-20 Interprovincial Championship in 2011, and scored a hat-trick of tries in the game against Munster. Layden made his senior Connacht debut on 8 October 2011, coming on in a 2011–12 Pro12 match as a replacement against Leinster.

Layden's next two seasons were hampered by injuries, and although he featured for the second-tier team, the Connacht Eagles, in the British and Irish Cup, Layden did not play for the senior side again during his time in the academy. At the end of the 2013–14 season, Layden had completed the maximum three years in the academy. Despite his injury problems, Connacht offered Layden a further one-year contract, which saw him become a member of the senior team for the 2014–15 season. Layden made three appearances in the 2014–15 Pro12, starting against Newport Gwent Dragons and Ospreys, and coming on as a replacement against Cardiff Blues. Layden left Connacht at the end of the season.

Layden now plays with Buccaneers in the All-Ireland League.

== International ==
=== Under-20 ===
Layden represented Ireland internationally at under-age level. He played for the Ireland Under-20s in the 2012 Six Nations Under 20s Championship. Layden started in all five games, and scored tries against Wales, Italy and Scotland. Layden was also initially named to the Ireland Under-20 squad for the 2012 IRB Junior World Championship, but injury forced him to miss the tournament, and he was replaced by his fellow Connacht academy member Conor Finn.

=== Sevens ===
In 2015 Layden left Connacht and his international focus switched to the sevens game. He represented Ireland at the 2015 European Olympic repechage competition in Lisbon, at which Ireland finished third. This was a good enough result for Ireland to be entered into the World Olympic repechage competition. This competition, played in 2016, offered an opportunity to qualify for the 2016 Olympic games in Rio de Janeiro, but Ireland lost to Spain in the quarterfinal and failed to qualify.

Layden was part of Ireland's 2017 training squad for the national sevens team. Layden, however, did not earn a spot on the twelve-man roster for any of the four tournaments on the 2017 Sevens Grand Prix Series.
