= Tom McCartney =

New Zealand rugby union player (born 1985)

- Born: Thomas McCartney; 6 September 1985 (age 41) Auckland, New Zealand
- Height: 1.85 m (6 ft 1 in)
- Weight: 113 kg (249 lb)

Rugby union career
- Position(s): Hooker, Prop
- Current team: Connacht
Provincial / State sides
Years	Team	Apps	(Points)
2007	North Harbour	6	(0)
2007–2014	Auckland	94	(25)
2014–2020	Connacht	112	(70)
- Correct as of 13 July 2020
Super Rugby
Years	Team	Apps	(Points)
2008–2014	Blues	63	(10)
- Correct as of 1 June 2014

Tom McCartney (born 6 September 1985) is a rugby union player from New Zealand. Although he mostly played as a hooker, he also played as prop. McCartney retired from rugby finishing with Irish provincial team Connacht in the Pro14. McCartney's nickname, 'Freak,' comes from his strength in the gym.

== Career ==
=== New Zealand ===
==== Provincial ====
McCartney started his professional rugby career in 2007, starting an NPC game for North Harbour against Thames Valley, while on loan. Weeks later, McCartney made his debut for Auckland. McCartney made a total of 94 appearances for Auckland between 2007 and 2014, scoring five tries. In his final season, McCartney was the province's most capped player and captained the side.

==== Super Rugby ====
In 2008 McCartney was given a place in the Blues squad, making his debut from the bench in a match against the Chiefs. In April 2009, McCartney made his first start for the team, this coming against the Queensland Reds. McCartney made 64 appearances for the Blues and scored two tries, before leaving for Ireland in 2014.

=== Connacht ===
In 2014, McCartney signed a three-year deal with Irish provincial side Connacht. He joined the side for the 2014–15 season, but did not link up with the squad until after Auckland had finished in the 2014 ITM Cup. Auckland were knocked out in the semi-finals of the competition on 18 October, and McCartney made his debut for Connacht on 21 November, coming on as a replacement against Zebre in the 2014–15 Pro12. McCartney made a further 14 appearances in the league all of them coming as starts. He made his European debut on 6 December 2014 against Bayonne in the 2014–15 Challenge Cup, and made three more appearances in the competition, all of them starts. Having celebrated his 50th Connacht appearance with a Man of the Match performance and two tries against Benetton Treviso in the Guinness PRO12, McCartney secured his place at Sportsground with a 3-year extension until at least the summer of 2020. He became a strong fan favourite was part of coach Pat Lam's PRO12 title-winning team in 2016 and along with 7 of his team-mates was selected for the PRO12 Dream Team of the season by PRO14 players. McCartney also started in Connacht's final game of the season, a play-off with Gloucester for entry to the 2015–16 Champions Cup, which Connacht lost after extra time. On 22 March 2019, McCartney earned his 100th cap for the province. He went on to play in his final year for Connacht in the 2019/20 season which was unexpectedly cut short due to the COVID-19 pandemic. He played his last game for Connacht starting against Toulouse in Heineken Champions Cup at The Sportsground on 11 Jan 2020. His contract ended in June 2020.
