= Jack Carty (rugby union) =

Irish rugby union player (born 1992)

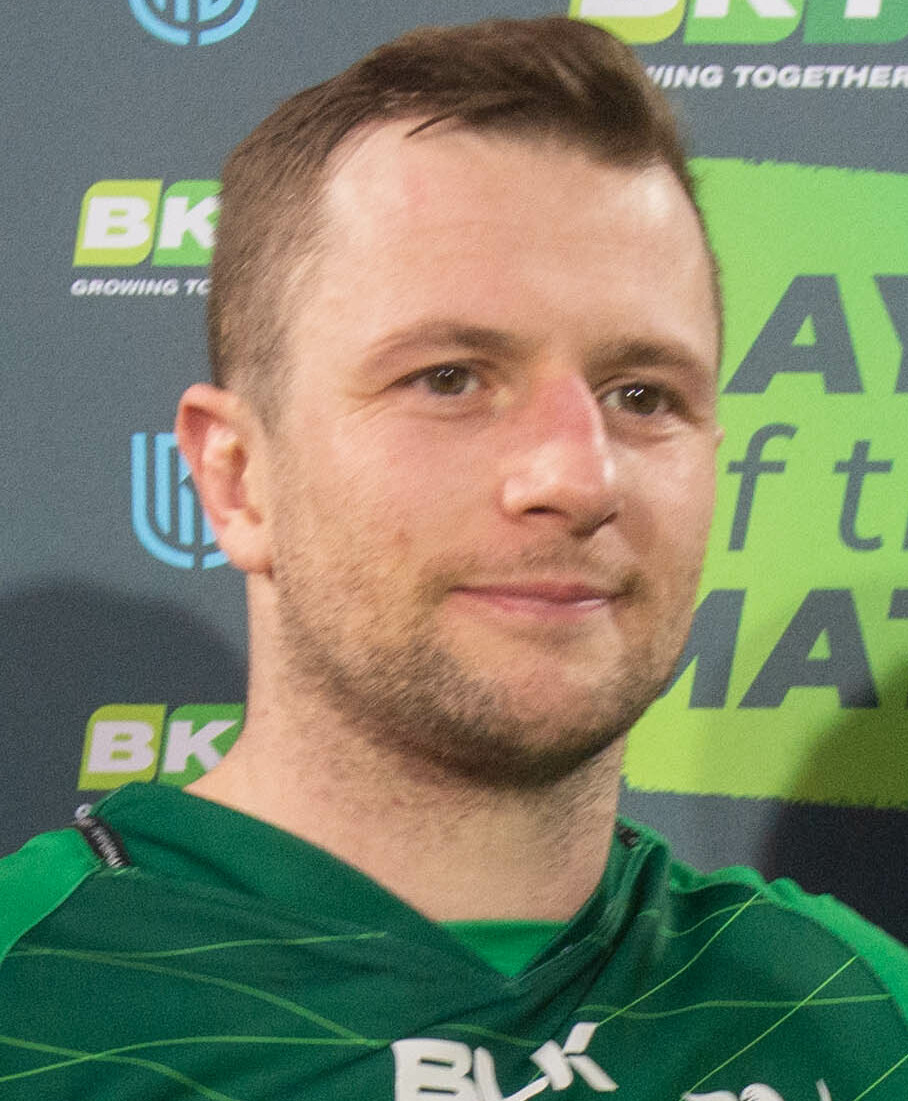
- Carty in 2023 for Connacht
- Born: 31 August 1992 (age 34) Athlone, Ireland
- Height: 1.81 m (5 ft 11 1/2 in)
- Weight: 88 kg (13 st 12 lb)
- School: Marist College
- University: NUI Galway
- Notable relative: Luke Carty (brother)

Rugby union career
- Position: Fly-half
- Current team: Connacht
Amateur team(s)
Years	Team	Apps	(Points)
- Buccaneers
Senior career
Years	Team	Apps	(Points)
2012–2026	Connacht	231	(1,260)
- Correct as of 20 March 2026
International career
Years	Team	Apps	(Points)
2012	Ireland U20	4	(11)
2014–2022	Ireland	11	(16)
- Correct as of 14 February 2022

Jack Carty (born 31 August 1992) is a retired rugby union player from Ireland. His primary position was at fly-half. Having started with his hometown club, Buccaneers, Carty played professionally for the team of his native province of Connacht in the United Rugby Championship, having come through the team's academy. He is Connacht's all-time leading points scorer. Carty is an Ireland international, having made his debut for the side against Italy in 2014.

== Early life ==
Carty received his secondary education at Marist College, Athlone. He attended university at NUI Galway. Before becoming a professional rugby player, Carty played a number of other sports. He represented Roscommon in Gaelic football at minor level, and also played soccer, representing the Republic of Ireland internationally as far as under-15 level. He was offered a trial with English football club Southampton, but turned it down in favour of a trial at West Ham United.

== Rugby career ==
=== Connacht ===
In his early career with Connacht, Carty primarily featured for the province's secondary team the Connacht Eagles, playing in the British and Irish Cup. Despite still being in the Connacht academy, Carty made his first appearance for the senior Connacht team on 21 September 2012, in a match against the Glasgow Warriors in the 2012–13 Pro12. He was a replacement at fullback for Gavin Duffy, coming on after 28 minutes. In the 2013–14 season, Carty regularly served as the team's captain. His next game came on 4 October 2013 when he made a substitute appearance against Italian team Benetton Treviso. On 27 December that year, he made his third appearance for the team, against inter-provincial rivals Munster.

Carty made his first start for Connacht on 4 January 2014, when he played at fly-half against the reigning Pro12 and Amlin Cup champions Leinster, in another derby. On 11 January, he played his first European match for the province, starting in their 2013–14 Heineken Cup match with Zebre, kicking two penalties and two conversions. In February that year, Carty signed his first professional contract with Connacht.

Following the retirement of Dan Parks, Carty became Connacht's first choice at fly-half for the 2014–15 season. He made 21 appearances in the Pro12, with 16 of these coming as starts. Carty played in five of the team's six 2014–15 Challenge Cup games, starting all but one of these. He also started the team's final game of the season, a play-off against Gloucester. The following season saw Carty continue to be first choice through to February 2016, when he injured himself on a water slide in Dubai and to have his spleen removed. He returned to first-team action that April, but couldn't dislodge AJ MacGinty and Shane O'Leary and missed out on a place in the Pro12 Final on 28 May. Carty appeared in 12 Pro12 and five Challenge Cup games in the 2015–16 season before his accident, and only two Pro12 games afterward.

The departure of MacGinty to Sale Sharks and injuries to new signing Marnitz Boshoff saw Carty return to first choice for the 2016–17 season. He started 18 games in the Pro12, featuring as a replacement in three more, and started five of the side's six games in the Champions Cup, missing the home game with Zebre through injury. Carty also started the team's Champions Cup play-off with Northampton Saints at the end of the season. He became Connacht's record points scorer in the Pro14 overtaking Ian Keatley in March 2019.

Following a strong season in the 2020–21 Championship, Carty was named to his second Pro14 Dream Team.

In January 2023 Carty overtook Eric Elwood as Connacht's leading points scorer. In December 2023 Carty earned his 200th cap for Connacht in 55–36 loss to Saracens in the 2023–24 European Rugby Champions Cup.

In March 2026 Carty announced that he would retire from professional rugby at the end of the season.

=== International ===
Carty has represented Ireland at various underage levels internationally. He was named in the Ireland under-20s team and represented them at the 2012 IRB Junior World Championship.

Carty was named in the senior squad for the opening rounds of the 2019 Six Nations. He made his debut on 24 February 2019, when he came on as a replacement in the 26–16 win against Italy in the Stadio Olimpico in Rome.

== Honours ==
Individual

- Pro14 Dream Team (2): 2018–19, 2020–21
- Pro14 Top Point Scorer: 2018–19
- Connacht all-time points leader: 1,260

Connacht

- Pro14 Championship (1): 2015–16

Ireland

- Six Nations Triple Crown: 2022
