= Ciaran Knight =

English rugby union player

- Born: Ciaran Knight; 18 March 1998 (age 28) Gloucester, England
- Height: 1.88 m (6 ft 2 in)
- Weight: 121 kg (19 st 1 lb)
- School: St Peter's High School
- Notable relative(s): Shaun Knight (cousin); Ryan Charles (cousin)

Rugby union career
- Position: Tighthead Prop
Senior career
Years	Team	Apps	(Points)
2018–	Gloucester	105	(10)
- Correct as of 4 Mar 2026
International career
Years	Team	Apps	(Points)
2016–2018	England U20s	14	(0)
- Correct as of 9 September 2019

Ciaran Knight (born 18 March 1998) is an English professional rugby union player who plays for Gloucester in the Premiership Rugby. He plays as a prop.

Knight previously attended Brockworth Comprehensive School and St Peter's High School. He first played for Matson RFC from a young age. This played a major developmental role for him to join the Gloucester Rugby Academy from the 2016–17 season.

His best experience was winning the Triangular International Festival as a member of the England Counties U18 squad, under then Head Coach Dave Reed, at Hartpury College last April. It included a 7–5 win over France, which was England's first victory in matches between the sides for nine years. He also scored a maiden try against France in his third game for England U18 in Cape Town, South Africa last August.

Knight helped the England Under-20s win the 2017 Six Nations Under 20s Championship Knight also played for them during World Rugby Under 20 Championship in 2017 and 2018, both held in Georgia and France respectively.

On 14 February 2019, Knight signed his first professional contract to stay with Gloucester, thus promoted to the senior squad from the 2019–20 season.
