= Ciaran Gaffney =

Irish rugby union player

- Born: 6 May 1995 (age 31) Dublin, Ireland
- Height: 1.88 m (6 ft 2 in)
- Weight: 96.82 kg (15 st 3.5 lb)
- School: St. Joseph's College; Cistercian College
- University: NUI Galway
- Height and weight correct as of 6 April 2018

Rugby union career
- Position: Fullback
- Current team: Zebre
Amateur team(s)
Years	Team	Apps	(Points)
2014–2017	Galwegians		
2017	Zingari-Richmond		
- Correct as of 6 April 2018
Senior career
Years	Team	Apps	(Points)
2015–2017	Connacht	2	(0)
2015–2017	→Connacht Eagles	8	(0)
2017–2018	Zebre	18	(5)
- Correct as of 6 April 2018
International career
Years	Team	Apps	(Points)
2013	Ireland U18	1	(0)
2014–2015	Ireland U20	10	(10)
- Correct as of 6 April 2018

Ciaran Gaffney (born 6 May 1995) is a former rugby union player from Ireland. He played as a fullback or on the wing, and also played at centre in his youth career. Gaffney last played for Italian side Zebre in the Pro14, having come through the academy of Irish side Connacht.

Born in Dublin, Gaffney was educated in the Bish in Galway and the Cistercian College in Roscrea and also studied at NUI Galway. He represented Ireland in under-age rugby, playing up to under-20 level. A serious back and neck injury sustained while playing for Zebre against his old side Connacht at the Galway Sportsgrounds ended his playing career at the age of 23.

== Early life ==
Gaffney was born in Dublin, and grew up in Galway. He went to school in the St Joseph's Patrician College (commonly called "the Bish") in the city for his Junior Certificate, and moved to the Cistercian College in Roscrea for his fifth and sixth year. Gaffney returned to his home city for his third level education, studying commerce and French at NUI Galway.

Gaffney began playing rugby at the age of four, when he joined Galwegians. He was a frequent attendee of Connacht games, serving as a ball boy until the age of 13. Gaffney played rugby in school, playing for the Bish in the Connacht Junior Schools Cup and Cistercian College in the Leinster Senior Schools Cup. In addition to rugby, Gaffney played Gaelic football growing up. He played for Salthill-Knocknacarra and Galway up to minor level.

== Club career ==
=== Connacht ===
Gaffney played for Connacht at youth level from under-14 grade up. He was signed to the Connacht academy ahead of the 2014–15 season. He played for the province's second tier side, the Connacht Eagles, in his first two seasons. Gaffney made his debut for the senior team in November 2016, while still part of the academy, when he came on as a replacement in a Pro12 game against Irish rivals Ulster. He made his second appearance in January 2017. At the end of the season however, Gaffney did not sign a senior contract. Instead, on the advice of Connacht academy head Nigel Carolan, he headed to New Zealand.

=== Zingari-Richmond ===
After arriving in New Zealand, Gaffney began playing for amateur side Zingari-Richmond in the Dunedin Premier. He was invited to Dunedin by Otago head coach Cory Brown, a former elite player development officer for Connacht. The move was made with a view to Gaffney potentially playing for the provincial team and during his time in the country he was part of Otago's wider training squad.

=== Zebre ===
In August 2017, Gaffney signed for Italian Pro14 side Zebre. The team's head coach Michael Bradley had previously been head coach of Connacht. Gaffney made his debut for the team on 2 September 2017 against the Ospreys. He made his European debut on 13 October 2017 in a Challenge Cup game against Agen. His first try for Zebre came in a Challenge Cup game against Gloucester.

In February 2018, Gaffney was injured seriously playing against his former team, Connacht. He suffered a ruptured disk and dislocated his neck and was rushed to hospital where he was kept immobile for three days before surgery could be performed. Gaffney was ultimately forced to retire from rugby as a result of the injury, having played 18 games for Zebre.

== International career ==
Gaffney represented Ireland internationally at under-age level. He made one appearance for the Irish schools team in 2013 on the back of his performances for Cistercian College. Gaffney played for the under-20 team in 2014 and 2015. He did not play in the 2014 Under-20 Six Nations but was named in the squad by Mike Ruddock for the 2014 Junior World Cup. Gaffney made his debut for the under-20 side against France in the pool stages. He started and played the full 80 minutes of all Ireland's games as they finished fourth in the tournament. In the 2015 Under-20 Six Nations, Gaffney made his tournament debut and played in two of the side's five games, as Ireland finished fifth. In April 2015, Nigel Carolan named him in the squad for the upcoming Junior World Cup. Gaffney played in three of the team's five games in the tournament as Ireland finished seventh.
