= Florian Lapeyrade =

- Born: Florian Lapeyrade; 9 August 1990 (age 36)
- Height: 1.75 m (5 ft 9 in)
- Weight: 100 kg (15 st 10 lb; 220 lb)

Rugby union career
- Position: Prop
Senior career
Years	Team	Apps	(Points)
2013-16	Bayonne	19	(5)
2016-	Anglet Olympique	43	(5)
- Correct as of 24 January 2015

Florian Lapeyrade (born 9 August 1990) is a French professional rugby union player. He plays at prop for Bayonne in the Top 14.
