= 2015–16 European Rugby Challenge Cup =

International rugby union tournament

Tournament details
- Countries: England; France; Ireland; Italy; Russia; Scotland; Wales
- Tournament format(s): Round-robin and Knockout
- Date: 12 November 2015 – 13 May 2016

Tournament statistics
- Teams: 20
- Matches played: 61
- Attendance: 415,348 (6,809 per match)
- Highest attendance: 28,556; Montpellier v Harlequins; 13 May 2016
- Lowest attendance: 400; Enisey-STM v Newcastle Falcons; 16 January 2016
- Tries scored: 347 (5.69 per match)
- Top point scorer(s): Benoît Paillaugue (Montpellier); Rhys Patchell (Cardiff Blues) (56 points)
- Top try scorer(s): Marcus Watson (Newcastle Falcons) (6 tries)

Final
- Venue: Grand Stade de Lyon, Lyon
- Champions: (France) Montpellier (1st title)
- Runners-up: (England) Harlequins

The 2015–16 European Rugby Challenge Cup was the second edition of the European Rugby Challenge Cup, an annual pan-European rugby union competition for professional clubs. It is also the 20th season of the Challenge Cup competition in all forms, following on from the now defunct European Challenge Cup. Due to the 2015 Rugby World Cup taking place during September and October 2015, the competition began slightly later than usual, with the first round of the group stage, on the weekend of 12/13/14/15 November 2015, and ended with the final on 13 May 2016 in Lyon.

Gloucester were the 2014 1–5 champions, having beaten Edinburgh 19–13 in the final.

Montpellier won the cup, defeating Harlequins in the final 26–19.

== Teams ==
20 teams qualified for the 2015–16 European Rugby Challenge Cup; a total of 18 qualified from across the Premiership, Pro12 and Top 14, as a direct result of their domestic league performance, with two coming through a play-off. The distribution of teams was:

- England: 6
  - Any teams, excluding the 2014–15 European Rugby Challenge Cup winner, finishing between 7th-11th position in the Aviva Premiership. (4 Teams)
  - The champion of the 2014–15 Greene King IPA Championship. (1 Team)
  - There was a sixth club from England, after Gloucester lost the play-off series for entry into the European Rugby Champions Cup. (1 club)
- France: 7
  - Any teams finishing between 8th-12th position in the Top 14. (5 Teams)
  - The champion, and the winner of the promotion play-off, from the Pro D2. (2 Teams)
- Ireland, Italy, Scotland & Wales: 5 teams
  - Any teams that did not qualify for the European Rugby Champions Cup, or the play-off, through the Guinness Pro12. (4 teams)
  - There was a 5th team from Pro12, after Connacht were defeated by Gloucester in the first round of the Champions Cup play-off. (1 team)
- Other European Nations: 2 teams
  - Two teams qualified through the 2014–15 Qualifying Competition, which took place alongside the Challenge Cup and Champions Cup competitions.

As of 24 May 2015, the following clubs qualified for the Challenge Cup:

Aviva Premiership	Top 14	Pro12				Qualifying Competition
England	France	Ireland	Italy	Scotland	Wales	(Europe) Other
Sale Sharks; Harlequins; Gloucester; London Irish; Newcastle Falcons; Worcester Warriors (GK IPA Championship winner)	Montpellier; La Rochelle; Brive; Grenoble; Castres Olympique; Pau (Pro D2 champion); Agen (Pro D2 Play-off winner)	Connacht	Zebre	Edinburgh	Newport Gwent Dragons; Cardiff Blues	(Italy) Calvisano; (Russia) Enisey-STM

=== Champions Cup play-off ===
The following teams took part in play-off matches to decide the final team in the Champions Cup. The play-off was held between Premiership side Gloucester, as Challenge Cup winners, and teams from the Pro12 and Top 14.

Aviva Premiership	Top 14	Pro 12
England	France	Ireland
Gloucester	Bordeaux Bègles	Connacht

The play-off was a two-match series, with the winner of the first match progressing to the second, and the winner of that second match qualifying for the Champions Cup. The two losing sides both joined the Challenge Cup.

24 May 2015
15:30 GMT

Gloucester (England)	40–32 (a.e.t.)	(Ireland) Connacht
	Report

Kingsholm Stadium, Gloucester
Attendance: 7,633
Referee: Romain Poite (FFR)

31 May 2015
17:00 GMT

Gloucester (England)	22−23	(France) Bordeaux Bègles
	Report

Sixways Stadium, Worcester
Attendance: 5,447
Referee: Leighton Hodges (WRU)

=== Qualifying Competition ===
In December 2014, EPCR announced an expanded format for the qualifying competition.

Six teams were to compete in two pools of three. Each team played the other once, either home or away. The winner of each pool then played a two-legged final against last year's qualifying sides, and the winners, on aggregate, took the two remaining places in the Challenge Cup.

==== Pool 1 play-off ====
18 April 2015

Rovigo Delta (Italy)	17–17	(Italy) Calvisano

2 May 2015

Calvisano (Italy)	35−7	(Italy) Rovigo Delta

- Calvisano won the play-off 52–24 on aggregate, and qualified for the Challenge Cup.

==== Pool 2 play-off ====
18 April 2015

CSM Baia Mare (Romania)	20–30	(Russia) Enisey-STM

2 May 2015

Enisey-STM (Russia)	33–12	(Romania) CSM Baia Mare

- Enisey-STM won the play-off 63–32 on aggregate, and competed in the Challenge Cup

=== Team details ===
Below is the list of coaches, captain and stadiums with their method of qualification for each team.

Note: Placing shown in brackets, denotes standing at the end of the regular season for their respective leagues, with their end of season positioning shown through CH for Champions, RU for Runner-up, SF for losing Semi-finalist and QF for losing Quarter-finalist.

Team	Coach / Director of Rugby	Captain	Stadium	Capacity	Method of Qualification
(France) Agen	(France) Philippe Sella	(France) Lionel Mazars	Stade Armandie	14,000	Pro D2 runner-up
(France) Brive	(France) Nicolas Godignon	(France) Arnaud Méla	Stade Amédée-Domenech	16,000	Top 14 7th-12th (10th)
(Italy) Calvisano	(Italy) Massimo Brunello	(Italy) Tommaso Castello	Centro Sportivo San Michele	4,000	Challenge Cup Qualification play-off
(Wales) Cardiff Blues	(Wales) Danny Wilson	(Wales) Gethin Jenkins	BT Sport Cardiff Arms Park	12,500	Pro12 bottom 5 (10th)
(France) Castres Olympique	(France) Christophe Urios	(Uruguay) Rodrigo Capo Ortega	Stade Pierre-Antoine	11,500	Top 14 7th-12th (12th)
(Ireland) Connacht	(Samoa) Pat Lam	(Ireland) John Muldoon	Sportsgrounds	7,800	7th-place play-off loser
(Scotland) Edinburgh	(South Africa) Alan Solomons	(Scotland) Mike Coman	Murrayfield Stadium	67,144 (Note: Although Murrayfield's full capacity is 67,144, only the lower section of the West Stand, with a capacity of 12,464, is generally opened for Edinburgh fixtures.)	Pro12 bottom 5 (8th)
(Russia) Enisey-STM	(Russia) Alexander Pervukhin	(Latvia) Jurijs Baranovs	Central Stadium; Sochi Central Stadium	15,000; 10,200	Challenge Cup Qualification play-off
(England) Gloucester	(Ireland) David Humphreys	(England) Billy Twelvetrees	Kingsholm Stadium	16,500	7th-place play-off loser
(France) Grenoble	(France) Fabrice Landreau	(France) Fabien Gengenbacher	Stade des Alpes	20,068	Top 14 7th-12th (11th)
(England) Harlequins	(Ireland) Conor O'Shea	(England) Danny Care	Twickenham Stoop	14,816	Aviva Premiership 7th-11th (8th)
(France) La Rochelle	(France) Patrice Collazo	(France) Uini Atonio	Stade Marcel-Deflandre	15,000	Top 14 7th-12th (9th)
(England) London Irish	(New Zealand) Tom Coventry	(England) George Skivington	Madejski Stadium	24,161	Aviva Premiership 7th-11th (10th)
(France) Montpellier	(South Africa) Jake White	(France) Fulgence Ouedraogo	Altrad Stadium	14,700	Top 14 7th-12th (8th)
(England) Newcastle Falcons	(England) John Wells	(England) Will Welch	Kingston Park	10,200	Aviva Premiership 7th-11th (11th)
(Wales) Newport Gwent Dragons	(Wales) Lyn Jones	(Wales) T. Rhys Thomas	Rodney Parade	8,500	Pro12 bottom 5 (9th)
(France) Pau	(New Zealand) Simon Mannix	(France) Julien Pierre	Stade du Hameau	13,819	Pro D2 Champion
(England) Sale Sharks	(England) Steve Diamond	(New Zealand) Daniel Braid	AJ Bell Stadium	12,000	Aviva Premiership 7th-11th (7th)
(England) Worcester Warriors	(England) Dean Ryan	(South Africa) Gerrit-Jan van Velze	Sixways Stadium	12,024	2014–15 RFU Championship Champion
(Italy) Zebre	(Italy) Gianluca Guidi	(Italy) George Biagi	Stadio Sergio Lanfranchi	5,000	Pro12 bottom 5 (12th)

== Seeding ==
The 20 competing teams were seeded and split into four tiers; seeding was based on performance in their respective domestic leagues. Where promotion and relegation is in effect in a league, the promoted team was seeded last, or (if multiple teams are promoted) by performance in the lower tier. So, Pau – who were Pro D2 champions – will be seeded above Agen – who qualified through the Pro D2 play-off.

Rank	Top 14	Premiership	Pro 12	Qualifying Competition
1	(France) Montpellier	(England) Sale Sharks	(Ireland) Connacht	(Italy) Calvisano
2	(France) La Rochelle	(England) Harlequins	(Scotland) Edinburgh	(Russia) Enisey-STM
3	(France) Brive	(England) Gloucester	(Wales) Newport Gwent Dragons	
4	(France) Grenoble	(England) London Irish	(Wales) Cardiff Blues	
5	(France) Castres Olympique	(England) Newcastle Falcons	(Italy) Zebre	
6	(France) Pau	(England) Worcester Warriors		
7	(France) Agen			

Teams were taken from a league in order of rank and put into a tier. A draw was used to allocate two second seeds to Tier 1; the remaining team went into Tier 2. This allocation indirectly determined which fourth-seeded team entered Tier 2, while the others entered Tier 3.

Given the nature of the Qualifying Competition, a competition including developing rugby nations and Italian clubs not competing in the Pro12, Rugby Europe 1 and Rugby Europe 2 were automatically included in Tier 4, despite officially being ranked 1/2 from that competition.

The brackets show each team's seeding and their league (for example, 1 Top 14 indicates the team was seeded 1st from the Top 14).

Tier 1	(Ireland) Connacht (1 Pro12)	(England) Sale Sharks (1 AP)	(France) Montpellier (1 Top 14)	(France) La Rochelle (2 Top 14)	(Scotland) Edinburgh (2 Pro12)
Tier 2	(England) Harlequins (2 AP)	(Wales) Newport Gwent Dragons (3 Pro12)	(England) Gloucester (3 AP)	(France) Brive (3 Top 14)	(England) London Irish (4 AP)
Tier 3	(France) Grenoble (4 Top 14)	(Wales) Cardiff Blues (4 Pro12)	(Italy) Zebre (5 Pro12)	(England) Newcastle Falcons (5 AP)	(France) Castres Olympique (5 Top 14)
Tier 4	(England) Worcester Warriors (6 AP)	(France) Pau (Top 14)	(France) Agen (Top 14)	(Italy) Calvisano (QC 1)	(Russia) Enisey-STM (QC 2)

The draw for the Challenge Cup took place on 17 June 2015 in Neuchâtel, Switzerland.

The following restrictions applied to the draw:

- The 5 pools each consisted of four clubs, one from each of the 4 Tiers.
- Each pool was required to have one Aviva Premiership club from Tier 1, 2 or 3, one Top 14 club from Tier 1, 2 or 3, and one Pro12 club from Tier 1, 2 or 3 (with the possibility of a second Aviva or Top 14 or Pro12 club coming from Tier 4).
- If there were two PRO12 clubs in the same pool, they had to be from different countries. (There were 2 Welsh, 1 Irish, 1 Scottish and 1 Italian teams from the Pro12 this year.)
- Similarly, the two Italian sides (Tier 3 Zebre from the Pro12 and Tier 4 Calvisano from the Qualifying Competition) could not be in the same pool.

== Pool stage ==
The draw took place on 17 June 2015.

Teams will play each other twice, both at home and away, in the group stage, that will begin on weekend of 12/13/14/15 November 2015, and continued through to 21/22/23/24 January 2016, before the pool winners and three best runners-up progressed to the quarter-finals.

Teams will be awarded competition points, based on match result. Teams receive 4 points for a win, 2 points for a draw, 1 attacking bonus point for scoring four or more tries in a match and 1 defensive bonus point for losing a match by seven points or fewer.

In the event of a tie between two or more teams, the following tie-breakers will be used, as directed by EPCR:

1. Where teams have played each other
  1. The club with the greater number of competition points from only matches involving tied teams.
  2. If equal, the club with the best aggregate points difference from those matches.
  3. If equal, the club that scored the most tries in those matches.
2. Where teams remain tied and/or have not played each other in the competition (i.e. are from different pools)
  1. The club with the best aggregate points difference from the pool stage.
  2. If equal, the club that scored the most tries in the pool stage.
  3. If equal, the club with the fewest players suspended in the pool stage.
  4. If equal, the drawing of lots will determine a club's ranking.

Key to colours
Winner of each pool, advanced to quarter-finals.
Three highest-scoring second-place teams advanced to quarter-finals.

=== Pool 1 ===
Pos	Team	Pld	W	D	L	PF	PA	PD	TF	TA	TB	LB	Pts
1	(Ireland) Connacht (5)	6	4	0	2	147	96	+51	20	12	2	1	19
2	(England) Newcastle Falcons	6	3	0	3	137	97	+40	20	9	3	1	16
3	(France) Brive	6	3	0	3	114	88	+26	12	11	1	3	16
4	(Russia) Enisey-STM	6	2	0	4	63	180	−117	8	28	0	0	8

Source: espn.co.uk

=== Pool 2 ===
Pos	Team	Pld	W	D	L	PF	PA	PD	TF	TA	TB	LB	Pts
1	(England) Sale Sharks (3)	6	5	0	1	154	78	+76	20	9	3	0	23
2	(Wales) Newport Gwent Dragons (7)	6	4	0	2	151	117	+34	17	16	3	1	20
3	(France) Castres Olympique	6	3	0	3	124	136	−12	14	15	2	1	15
4	(France) Pau	6	0	0	6	68	166	−98	9	20	0	0	0

Source: espn.co.uk

=== Pool 3 ===
Pos	Team	Pld	W	D	L	PF	PA	PD	TF	TA	TB	LB	Pts
1	(England) Harlequins (1)	6	5	0	1	225	123	+102	31	13	5	0	25
2	(France) Montpellier (6)	6	4	0	2	221	116	+105	28	13	4	0	20
3	(Wales) Cardiff Blues	6	3	0	3	229	131	+98	31	14	4	1	17
4	(Italy) Calvisano	6	0	0	6	39	344	−305	3	53	0	0	0

Source: espn.co.uk

=== Pool 4 ===
Pos	Team	Pld	W	D	L	PF	PA	PD	TF	TA	TB	LB	Pts
1	(England) Gloucester (2)	6	6	0	0	151	86	+65	16	10	1	0	25
2	(Italy) Zebre	6	3	0	3	114	92	+22	11	12	0	1	13
3	(France) La Rochelle	6	2	0	4	100	127	−27	12	13	2	0	10
4	(England) Worcester Warriors	6	1	0	5	88	148	−60	9	14	0	1	5

Source: espn.co.uk

=== Pool 5 ===
Pos	Team	Pld	W	D	L	PF	PA	PD	TF	TA	TB	LB	Pts
1	(France) Grenoble (4)	6	5	0	1	187	154	+33	22	19	2	0	22
2	(England) London Irish (8)	6	3	0	3	170	106	+64	25	10	3	2	17
3	(Scotland) Edinburgh	6	4	0	2	125	103	+22	14	12	1	0	17
4	(France) Agen	6	0	0	6	98	217	−119	13	32	1	1	2

Source: espn.co.uk

=== Pool winners and runners-up rankings ===
Rank	Pool Winners	Pts	TF	+/−
1	(England) Harlequins	25	31	+102
2	(England) Gloucester	25	16	+65
3	(England) Sale Sharks	23	20	+76
4	(France) Grenoble	22	22	+33
5	(Ireland) Connacht	19	20	+51
Rank	Pool Runners–up	Pts	TF	+/−
6	(France) Montpellier	20	28	+105
7	(Wales) Newport Gwent Dragons	20	17	+34
8	(England) London Irish	17	25	+64
9	(England) Newcastle Falcons	16	20	+40
10	(Italy) Zebre	13	11	+22

== Knock-out stage ==
The eight qualifiers were ranked according to performance in the pool stages, and competed in the quarter-finals, which were held on the weekend of 8/9/10 April 2016. The four top seeds hosted the quarter-finals against the lower seeds, in a 1v8, 2v7, 3v6 and 4v5 format.

The semi-finals were played on the weekend of 22/23/24 April 2016. In lieu of the draw that was used to determine the semi-final pairing, EPCR announced that a fixed semi-final bracket would be set in advance, and that home advantage would be awarded to a side based on "performances by clubs during the pool stages as well as the achievement of a winning a quarter-final match away from home".

Home advantage was awarded as follows:

Winner of QF		Semi-final 1 (Home v Away)
1	4	1 v 4
1	5	5 v 1
8	4	8 v 4
8	5	5 v 8

Winner of QF		Semi-final 2 (Home v Away)
3	2	2 v 3
3	7	7 v 3
6	2	6 v 2
6	7	6 v 7

The winners of the semi-finals would contest the final, at Parc Olympique Lyonnais (called "Grand Stade de Lyon" by EPCR), on 13 May 2016.

=== Bracket ===
Quarter-finals
1	(England) Harlequins	38
8	(England) London Irish	30
4	(France) Grenoble	33
5	(Ireland) Connacht	32
3	(England) Sale Sharks	19
6	(France) Montpellier	25
2	(England) Gloucester	21
7	(Wales) Newport Gwent Dragons	23

Semi-finals
1	(England) Harlequins	30
4	(France) Grenoble	6
6	(France) Montpellier	22
7	(Wales) Newport Gwent Dragons	12

Final
1	(England) Harlequins	19
6	(France) Montpellier	26

=== Quarter-finals ===
8 April 2016
19:45

Sale Sharks (England) (3)	19–25	(6) (France) Montpellier
Try: Brady 21' m James 76' m Pen: Cipriani (3/3) 11', 32', 61'	Report	Try: Willemse 14' c Con: Paillaugue (1/1) 15'; Pen: Paillaugue (6/8) 17', 45', 55', 64', 67', 71'

AJ Bell Stadium
Attendance: 4,557
Referee: John Lacey (IRFU)

9 April 2016
12:45

Gloucester (England) (2)	21–23	(7) (Wales) Newport Gwent Dragons
Try: Morgan 13' m McColl 63' c Con: Laidlaw (1/2) 64'; Pen: Laidlaw (3/3) 19', 26', 71'	Report	Try: Davies 76' m Pen: D. Jones (6/6) 9', 16', 32', 39', 44', 54'

Kingsholm Stadium
Attendance: 10,501
Referee: Pascal Gaüzère (FFR)

9 April 2016
21:05

Grenoble (France) (4)	33–32	(5) (Ireland) Connacht
Try: Wisniewski 32' c Dupont 61' c Diaby 69' c Con: Wisniewski (3/3) 33', 62', 70'; Pen: Wisniewski (3/3) 20', 37', 40'; Drop: Wisniewski (1/1) 75'	Report	Try: Adeolokun (2) 11' c, 28' c Henshaw 22' m Healy 42' c Con: O'Leary (3/4) 12', 29', 43'; Pen: O'Leary (1/1) 53'; Cooney (1/1) 72'

Stade des Alpes
Attendance: 14,077
Referee: Matthew Carley (RFU)

9 April 2016
20:05

Harlequins (England) (1)	38–30	(8) (England) London Irish
Try: Wallace (2) 6' m, 61' m Care (3) 20' c, 52' m, 74' c Con: Botica (2/5) 22', 76'; Pen: Botica (3/4) 26', 36', 71'	Report	Try: Mulchrone 27' c McKibbin 44' c Maitland 50' c Con: Geraghty (3/3) 28', 45', 51'; Pen: Geraghty (3/3) 13', 24', 33'

Twickenham Stoop
Attendance: 9,851
Referee: Marius Mitrea (FIR)

=== Semi-finals ===
22 April 2016
19:45

Harlequins (England)	30–6	(France) Grenoble
Try: Roberts 11' c Evans 53' c Lowe 68' c Con: Botica (1/1) 12'; Evans (2/2) 54', 68'; Pen: Botica (2/2) 6', 17'; Evans (1/2) 66'	Report	Pen: Wisniewski (2/2) 15', 26'

Twickenham Stoop
Attendance: 10,563
Referee: John Lacey (IRFU)

23 April 2016
18:30

Montpellier (France)	22–12	(Wales) Newport Gwent Dragons
Try: B. du Plessis 59' c Con: Catrakilis (1/1) 60'; Pen: Catrakilis (4/4) 20', 28', 32', 54'; Paillaugue (1/1) 35'	Report	Try: Amos 61' m Meyer 77' c Con: O'Brien (1/2) 78'

Altrad Stadium
Attendance: 7,692
Referee: Wayne Barnes (RFU)

=== Final ===
13 May 2016
21:00

Harlequins (England)	19–26	(France) Montpellier
Try: Yarde 71' c Con: Botica (1/1) 72'; Pen: Evans (3/3) 4', 31', 34'; Botica (1/1) 77'	Report	Try: Mogg 22' c, 47' c Con: Catrakilis (2/2) 23', 48'; Pen: Catrakilis (4/4) 7', 28', 54', 67'

Grand Stade de Lyon, Lyon
Attendance: 28,556
Referee: John Lacey (IRFU)

== Attendances ==
- Does not include final as this is held at a neutral venue.

Club	Home Games	Total	Average	Highest	Lowest	% Capacity
(France) Agen	3	13,664	4,555	5,200	3,932	33%
(France) Brive	3	12,000	4,000	6,000	3,000	25%
(Italy) Calvisano	3	3,900	1,300	1,500	1,100	33%
(Wales) Cardiff Blues	3	15,341	5,114	5,490	4,602	41%
(France) Castres Olympique	3	20,421	6,807	7,580	6,025	59%
(Ireland) Connacht	3	12,964	4,321	4,357	4,261	55%
(Scotland) Edinburgh	3	9,915	3,305	3,551	3,100	5%
(Russia) Enisey-ETM	3	3,500	1,167	2,500	400	7%
(England) Gloucester	4	40,625	10,156	10,942	9,209	62%
(France) Grenoble	4	40,308	10,077	14,077	8,361	50%
(England) Harlequins	5	51,692	10,338	12,912	7,136	70%
(France) La Rochelle	3	31,863	10,621	12,763	8,500	71%
(England) London Irish	3	11,859	3,953	4,216	3,684	16%
(France) Montpellier	4	31,092	7,773	9,900	6,000	53%
(England) Newcastle Falcons	3	11,963	3,988	4,093	3,803	39%
(Wales) Newport Gwent Dragons	3	12,973	4,324	4,455	4,202	49%
(France) Pau	3	21,500	7,167	8,000	6,000	52%
(England) Sale Sharks	4	17,103	4,276	4,557	4,006	36%
(England) Worcester Warriors	3	18,032	6,011	6,774	5,124	50%
(Italy) Zebre	3	5,854	1,951	2,413	1,657	39%

== See also ==
- 2015–16 European Rugby Champions Cup
