= Conor Finn =

Irish rugby player

- Born: Conor Finn; 24 September 1992 (age 34) Ballinasloe, Ireland
- Height: 1.83 m (6 ft 0 in)
- Weight: 98 kg (15 st 6 lb)
- School: Cistercian College, Roscrea
- University: NUI Galway

Rugby union career
- Position(s): Centre, Wing
- Current team: Connacht
Amateur team(s)
| Years | Team | Apps | (Points) |
- Buccaneers
Senior career
| Years | Team | Apps | (Points) |
| 2014–2016 | Connacht | 6 | (0) |
- Correct as of 5 July 2016
International career
| Years | Team | Apps | (Points) |
| 2012 | Ireland U20 | 7 | (0) |
- Correct as of 11 Feb 2015

Conor Finn (born 24 September 1992) is a rugby union player from Ireland. He most recently played professionally for the Irish provincial team Connacht Rugby in the Pro12. Finn plays both as a centre and on the wing.

== Early life ==
Born in Ballinasloe and raised in nearby Aughrim, Finn attended the Cistercian College boarding school in Roscrea, and captained the school's rugby team. He was a student at NUI Galway, graduating with a B.A. on 17 October 2016.

== Career ==
=== Connacht ===
Finn became part of the academy of his native provincial team Connacht Rugby in 2011. He was part of Connacht's U20 side that won the 2011 Inter Provincial title, scoring a match-winning try against Leinster U20s in Donnybrook. During his time in the academy, Finn played for the province's second tier side, the Connacht Eagles in the British and Irish Cup.

In April 2014, Finn signed a one-year professional contract with the province. The deal saw him promoted to the senior squad ahead of the 2014–15 season, and runs until the end of that year. Finn was promoted alongside fellow academy players Finlay Bealham and Darragh Leader, both of whom had previously been capped for the province at senior level.

=== International ===
Finn has represented Ireland internationally at under-age level. He played for the Ireland Under-20s in both the 2012 Six Nations Under 20s Championship and 2012 IRB Junior World Championship.
