= Dave McSharry =

Irish rugby union player

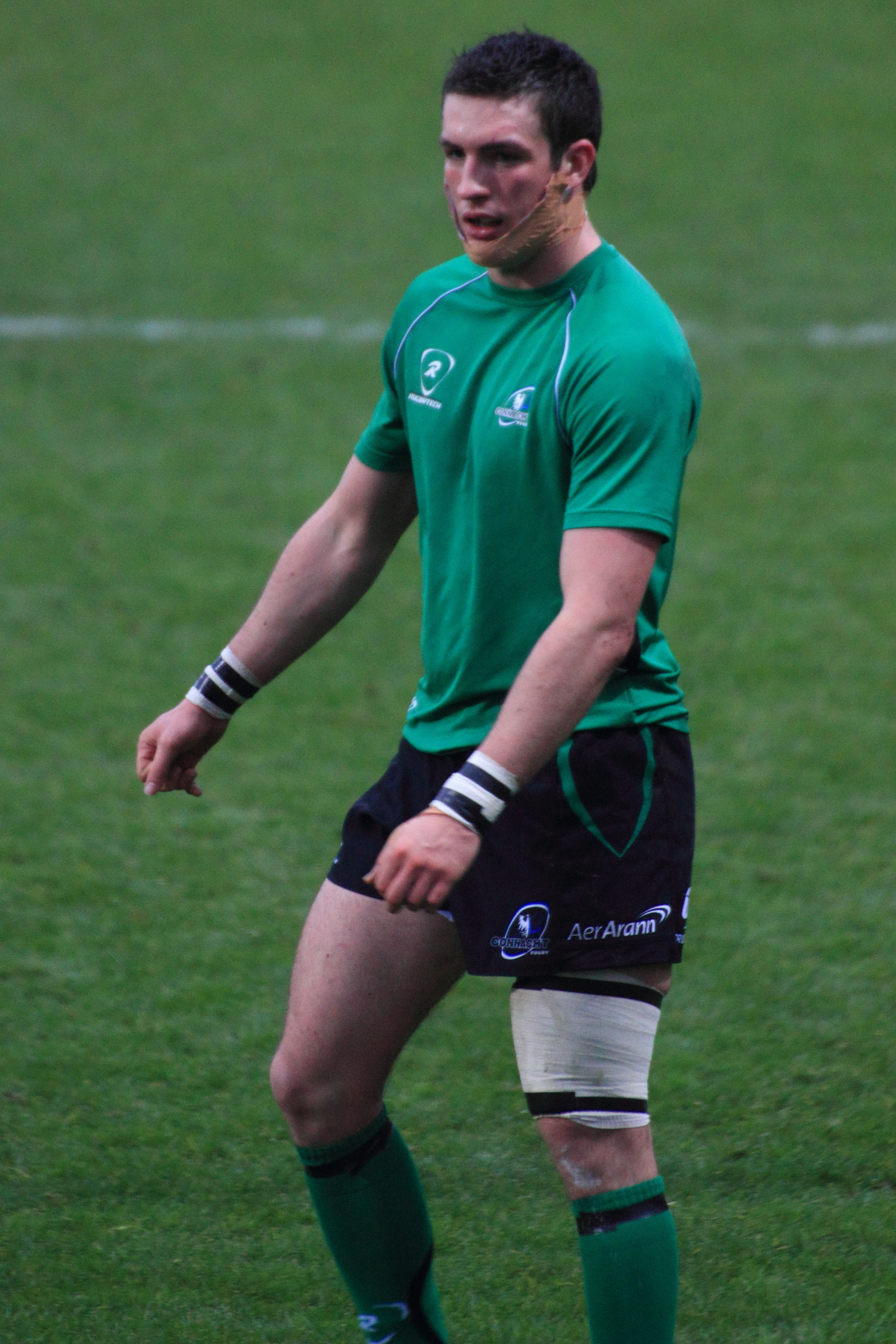
- McSharry before the game away to Toulouse in the 2011–12 Heineken Cup
- Born: David McSharry; 10 February 1990 (age 36) Dublin, Ireland
- Height: 1.87 m (6 ft 1 1/2 in)
- Weight: 100 kg (220 lb)
- University: University College Dublin

Rugby union career
- Position: Centre
Amateur team(s)
Years	Team	Apps	(Points)
- UCD
Provincial / State sides
Years	Team	Apps	(Points)
2011–2016	Connacht	65	(30)
- Correct as of 3 July 2016
International career
Years	Team	Apps	(Points)
2010	Ireland u20	2	(0)
2013	Wolfhounds	1	(0)
- Correct as of 9 February 2015

Dave McSharry (born 10 July 1990 in Dublin, Ireland) is a former professional rugby union player from Ireland. He played primarily as a centre, usually at inside centre. McSharry played for Irish provincial team Connacht in the Pro12 before he was forced to retire in 2016.

== Connacht ==
McSharry joined Connacht ahead of the 2011–12 season, having previously been in Leinster's Academy. McSharry made his debut for Connacht on 5 November 2011, starting against Ulster in the 2011–12 Pro12 and playing the full 80 minutes. McSharry made his European debut for the side with a start against Harlequins in the 2011–12 Heineken Cup on 11 November 2011, the province's first game in their first ever season in the competition. He made four more appearances in the competition, starting on each occasion. McSharry also made a total of nine appearances in the league that season, starting seven times and scoring one try. McSharry signed a contract extension in December 2011 that will see him remain with Connacht until at least 2014.

The following season saw McSharry play regularly when fit, but he missed parts of the season through hip and groin injuries. McSharry played ten games in the 2012–13 Pro12, starting all of the games he featured in, and scoring a try. In the 2012–13 Heineken Cup, McSharry played in and started all six of Connacht's games. He scored his first European try in the game with Harlequins on 20 October 2012.

In 2013–14, McSharry suffered a slow start to the season due to a long recovery from hip surgery. He made his first appearance in a 2013–14 Heineken Cup game with Zebre on 19 October 2013. McSharry played his first 2013–14 Pro12 game against Glasgow Warriors on 2 November 2013. McSharry started Connacht's game against Toulouse in the Heineken Cup, with the province overcoming the four-time European champions in a famous victory. McSharry was forced into another spell of absence with an ankle injury in December 2013. At the end of the season McSharry had played a total of three Heineken Cup games, and made 11 league appearances, with a try against Ulster.

The 2014–15 Pro12 saw McSharry play in 15 games, four of these appearances coming from the bench. He scored a single try, which came against Glasgow Warriors. At European level, McSharry played four times in the Challenge Cup, starting twice and scoring a try against Bayonne. He was forced to retire from Connacht due to concussion.

== Ireland ==
McSharry has represented Ireland at under-age international level, playing for the Under-18 and Under-20 teams. On the back of his form for Connacht, McSharry was named in the Ireland training squad for the 2013 Six Nations Championship on 17 January 2013. McSharry was also named in squad of the second tier 'A' side the Ireland Wolfhounds, for their friendly against England Saxons on 25 January 2013.
