= James Connolly (rugby union) =

- Born: 19 April 1993 (age 33) Dublin, Ireland
- Height: 1.89 m (6 ft 2 1/2 in)
- Weight: 106 kg (16.7 st; 234 lb)
- School: Newbridge College
- University: IT Carlow; Setanta College

Rugby union career
- Position: Flanker
- Current team: Nottingham
Amateur team(s)
Years	Team	Apps	(Points)
- Naas
–	Galway Corinthians		
Provincial / State sides
Years	Team	Apps	(Points)
2014–2019	Connacht	36	(5)
2019–	Nottingham	0	(0)
- Correct as of 9 May 2018

James Connolly (born 19 April 1993) is a professional rugby union player from Ireland. He primarily plays as a flanker. Connolly most recently played professionally for Irish provincial side Connacht in the Pro14, after coming through the province's academy.

== Early life ==
Connolly was born in Dublin city and raised in Naas, County Kildare. A graduate of Newbridge College, he started playing rugby with his local club Naas RFC at under-7 level. Connolly represented the college in the Leinster Junior Cup 2008 and the Leinster Senior Cup in 2011, being named Forward of the Year in the latter.

After finishing secondary education, Connolly attended IT Carlow while he was part of the Connacht Rugby under-age set up. Following this, he undertook a degree in Strength and Conditioning at Setanta College.

== Rugby career ==
=== Connacht ===
Born in Leinster, Connolly was a part of the youth set up at neighboring province Connacht for much of his development. He was nominated as the province's Player of the Year for his age grade at both under-19 and under-20 levels. While playing for Connacht, Connolly joined Galway Corinthians, an amateur side in the province. In June 2013, it was announced Connolly had signed an academy contract for the coming season. In his first academy season Connolly did not feature for the senior team, but did play for the province's second tier side the Connacht Eagles, playing in the 2013–14 British and Irish Cup.

Connolly made his first appearance for the senior side the following season. He made his debut when he started at number 6 in the 2014–15 Challenge Cup game against Bayonne. Connolly played in another two Challenge Cup matches that season, including the quarter-final against Gloucester. He also played in the final game of the season, the first round of a play-off to qualify for the following season's Champions Cup. Connacht were leading in the final minutes of the game, but a controversial penalty decision gave Gloucester a try-scoring opportunity and sent the match to extra time, in which Connacht were beaten.

Having signed his first full professional contract in December 2015, Connolly became a senior player in the 2016–17 season. He remained a part of the senior team for a further two seasons before being released at the end of the 2018–19 season. Connolly made a total of 36 senior competitive appearances in his time with the province.

=== Nottingham ===
Connolly moved to England to join RFU Championship side Nottingham ahead of the 2019–20 season.
