= 2015–16 European Rugby Champions Cup =

Sport event in Lyon, France

Tournament details
- Countries: England; France; Ireland; Italy; Scotland; Wales
- Tournament format(s): Round-robin and Knockout
- Date: 13 November 2015 – 14 May 2016

Tournament statistics
- Teams: 20
- Matches played: 67
- Attendance: 955,647 (14,263 per match)
- Tries scored: 321 (4.79 per match)
- Top point scorer(s): Owen Farrell (Saracens) (127 points)
- Top try scorer(s): Vereniki Goneva (Leicester Tigers); Thomas Waldrom (Exeter Chiefs) (6 tries)

Final
- Venue: Grand Stade de Lyon, Lyon
- Champions: (England) Saracens (1st title)
- Runners-up: (France) Racing 92

The 2015–16 European Rugby Champions Cup was the second European Rugby Champions Cup championship (21st overall), the annual rugby union club competition for teams from the top six nations in European rugby. The European Rugby Champions Cup replaced the Heineken Cup, which was Europe's top-tier competition for rugby clubs for the first nineteen years of professional European rugby union.

As a result of the 2015 Rugby World Cup being held in England, the tournament started slightly later than in previous seasons, with the opening round taking place on the weekend of 13/14/15 November 2015. The tournament was won for the first time by Saracens who beat Racing 92 in the final on the 14 May 2016, at Parc Olympique Lyonnais (called "Grand Stade de Lyon" by competition organiser European Professional Club Rugby) in the Lyon suburb of Décines.

== Teams ==
20 clubs, from the three major European domestic leagues, competed in the Champions Cup. Nineteen clubs qualified directly as a result of their domestic league performance, with the final team coming from a play-off.

The distribution of teams was as follows:

- England: 6 clubs
  - The top 6 clubs in the English Premiership. (6 clubs)
- France: 7 clubs
  - The top 6 clubs in the Top 14. (6 clubs)
  - The victory of Bordeaux Bègles in the play-off series against Gloucester gave France a seventh place in the Champions Cup. (1 club)
- Ireland, Italy, Scotland & Wales: 7 clubs, based on performance in the Pro12.
  - The best placed club from each nation. (4 clubs)
  - The 3 highest ranked clubs not qualified thereafter. (3 clubs)

| English Premiership | Top 14 | Pro 12 | | | |
| England | France | Ireland | Italy | Scotland | Wales |
|---|---|---|---|---|---|
| Northampton Saints; Bath; Leicester Tigers; Saracens; Exeter Chiefs; Wasps | Toulon; Clermont; Toulouse; Stade Français; Racing 92; Oyonnax; Bordeaux Bègles (7th Place play-off) | Munster; Ulster; Leinster | Benetton Treviso | Glasgow Warriors | Ospreys; Scarlets |

=== 20th team play-off ===
The following teams took part in play-off matches to decide the final team in the Champions Cup. The play-off was held between Premiership side Gloucester, as Challenge Cup winners, and teams from the Pro12 and Top 14. The losers of this play-off joined the Challenge Cup.

| English Premiership | Top 14 | Pro 12 |
| England | France | Ireland |
|---|---|---|
| Gloucester | Bordeaux Bègles | Connacht |

The play-off was a two-match series, with the winner of the first match, Gloucester, progressing to the second, and the winner of that second match, Bordeaux Bègles, qualifying for the Champions Cup.

24 May 2015
15:30 GMT

| Gloucester (England) | 40−32 (a.e.t.) | (Ireland) Connacht |
| | Report |

Kingsholm Stadium, Gloucester
Attendance: 7,633
Referee: Romain Poite (FFR)

31 May 2015
17:00 GMT

| Gloucester (England) | 22−23 | (France) Bordeaux Bègles |

Sixways Stadium, Worcester
Referee: Leighton Hodges (WRU)

=== Team details ===
Below is the list of coaches, captains and stadiums with their method of qualification for each team.

Note: Placing shown in brackets, denotes standing at the end of the regular season for their respective leagues, with their end of season positioning shown through CH for Champions, RU for Runner-up, SF for losing Semi-finalist and QF for losing Quarter-finalist.

| Team | Coach / Director of Rugby | Captain | Stadium | Capacity | Method of Qualification |
|---|---|---|---|---|---|
| (England) Bath | (England) Mike Ford | (England) Stuart Hooper | Recreation Ground | 13,500 | English Premiership top 6 (2nd) (RU) |
| (Italy) Benetton Treviso | (South Africa) Marius Goosen (For (Italy) Umberto Casellato) (Note: Umberto Casellato began the tournament as Benetton Treviso head coach, but was sacked on 5 January 2016, and replaced by Marius Goosen.) | (Italy) Alessandro Zanni | Stadio Comunale di Monigo | 6,700 | Pro12 top Italian team (11th) |
| (France) Bordeaux Bègles | (France) Raphaël Ibañez | (Australia) Matthew Clarkin | Stade Chaban-Delmas | 34,694 | 7th Place play-off winner |
| (France) Clermont | (France) Franck Azéma | (France) Damien Chouly | Stade Marcel-Michelin | 18,000 | Top 14 top 6 (2nd) (RU) |
| (England) Exeter Chiefs | (England) Rob Baxter | (England) Jack Yeandle | Sandy Park | 12,600 | English Premiership top 6 (5th) |
| (Scotland) Glasgow Warriors | (Scotland) Gregor Townsend | (Scotland) Jonny Gray | Scotstoun Stadium | 9,708 | Pro12 top Scottish team (1st) (CH) |
| (England) Leicester Tigers | (England) Richard Cockerill | (England) Ed Slater | Welford Road | 24,000 | English Premiership top 6 (3rd) (SF) |
| (Ireland) Leinster | (Ireland) Leo Cullen | (Fiji) Isa Nacewa | RDS Arena; Aviva Stadium | 18,500; 51,700 | Pro12 top 7 (5th) |
| (Ireland) Munster | (Ireland) Anthony Foley | (Ireland) CJ Stander | Thomond Park | 25,600 | Pro12 top Irish team (2nd) (RU) |
| (England) Northampton Saints | (England) Jim Mallinder | (England) Lee Dickson | Franklin's Gardens | 13,600 | English Premiership top 6 (1st) (SF) |
| (Wales) Ospreys | (Wales) Steve Tandy | (Wales) Alun Wyn Jones | Liberty Stadium | 20,532 | Pro12 top Welsh Team (3rd) (SF) |
| (France) Oyonnax | (France) Olivier Azam, then (France) Johann Authier | (France) Florian Denos | Stade Charles-Mathon | 11,400 | Top 14 top 6 (6th) (QF) |
| (France) Racing 92 | (France) Laurent Labit (France) Laurent Travers | (France) Dimitri Szarzewski | Stade Yves-du-Manoir | 14,000 | Top 14 top 6 (5th) (QF) |
| (England) Saracens | (Ireland) Mark McCall | (South Africa) Alistair Hargreaves | Allianz Park | 10,000 | English Premiership top 6 (4th) (CH) |
| (Wales) Scarlets | (New Zealand) Wayne Pivac | (Wales) Ken Owens (Wales) Scott Williams | Parc y Scarlets | 14,870 | Pro12 top 7 (6th) |
| (France) Stade Français | (Argentina) Gonzalo Quesada | (Italy) Sergio Parisse | Stade Jean-Bouin | 20,000 | Top 14 top 6 (4th) (CH) |
| (France) Toulon | (France) Bernard Laporte | (South Africa) Juan Smith (France) Jocelino Suta | Stade Mayol | 15,400 | Top 14 top 6 (1st) (SF) |
| (France) Toulouse | (France) Ugo Mola | (France) Thierry Dusautoir | Stade Ernest-Wallon; Stadium Municipal | 19,500; 35,575 | Top 14 top 6 (3rd) (SF) |
| (Ireland) Ulster | (Australia) Les Kiss | (Ireland) Rory Best | Kingspan Stadium | 18,196 | Pro12 top 7 (4th) (SF) |
| (England) Wasps | (Wales) Dai Young | (England) James Haskell (England) Matt Mullan | Ricoh Arena | 32,609 | English Premiership top 6 (6th) |

== Seeding ==
In each Champions Cup season, the 20 competing teams are seeded and split into four tiers, each containing 5 teams.

For the purpose of creating the tiers, clubs are ranked based on their domestic league performances and on their qualification for the knockout phases of their championships, so a losing quarter-finalist in the Top 14 would be seeded below a losing semi-finalist, even if they finished above them in the regular season. This represented a change for the English Premiership, which seeded teams for the 2014–15 Champions Cup without reference to their play-off performance, meaning Northampton Saints, who came top in the English Premiership, were seeded third - as the highest ranked losing semi-finalist. As a knock-on from this, Leicester Tigers, which came third in the league, dropped to fourth.

| Rank | Top 14 | Premiership | Pro 12 |
|---|---|---|---|
| 1 | (France) Stade Français | (England) Saracens | (Scotland) Glasgow Warriors |
| 2 | (France) Clermont | (England) Bath | (Ireland) Munster |
| 3 | (France) Toulon | (England) Northampton Saints | (Wales) Ospreys |
| 4 | (France) Toulouse | (England) Leicester Tigers | (Ireland) Ulster |
| 5 | (France) Racing 92 | (England) Exeter Chiefs | (Ireland) Leinster |
| 6 | (France) Oyonnax | (England) Wasps | (Wales) Scarlets |
| 7 | (France) Bordeaux Bègles | | (Italy) Benetton Treviso |

Based on these seedings, teams are placed into one of the four tiers, with the top seed clubs being put in Tier 1. The nature of the tier system means that a draw is needed to allocate two of the three second seed clubs to Tier 1, the remaining side being put into Tier 2. The draw also determines which fourth seed enters Tier 2, the place being given to the fourth seed from the league of the second seed placed in Tier 2. The other two sides fall into Tier 3.

The tiers are shown below. Brackets show each team's seeding and their league (for example, 1 Top 14 indicates the team was seeded 1st from the Top 14).

| Tier 1 | (England) Saracens (1 AP) | (Scotland) Glasgow (1 Pro12) | (France) Stade Français (1 Top 14) | (France) Clermont (2 Top 14) | (England) Bath (2 AP) |
| Tier 2 | (Ireland) Munster (2 Pro12) | (England) Northampton Saints (3 AP) | (Wales) Ospreys (3 Pro12) | (France) Toulon (3 Top 14) | (Ireland) Ulster (4 Pro12) |
| Tier 3 | (France) Toulouse (4 Top 14) | (England) Leicester Tigers (4 AP) | (England) Exeter Chiefs (5 AP) | (Ireland) Leinster (5 Pro12) | (France) Racing 92 (5 Top 14) |
| Tier 4 | (Wales) Scarlets (6 Pro12) | (England) Wasps (6 AP) | (France) Oyonnax (6 Top 14) | (Italy) Benetton Treviso (7 Pro12) | (France) Bordeaux (Play-Off) |

The pool draw took place 17 June, in Neuchâtel, Switzerland.

The following restrictions applied to the draw:

- The 5 pools each consisted of four clubs, one from each of the 4 Tiers.
- Each pool had to have one English Premiership club from Tier 1, 2 or 3, one Top 14 club from Tier 1, 2 or 3, and one Pro12 club from Tier 1, 2 or 3 (with a second Premiership, Top 14 or Pro12 club coming from Tier 4).
- If there were two Pro12 clubs in the same pool, they had to be from different countries (this season's competition featured three teams from Ireland, two from Wales and one each from Scotland and Italy).

== Pool stage ==
The draw took place on 17 June 2015.

Teams played each other twice, both at home and away, in the pool stage, that began on the weekend of 13/14/15 November 2015, and continued through to 22/23/24 January 2016, before the pool winners and three best runners-up progressed to the quarter-finals.

Teams were awarded competition points, based on match result. Teams receive 4 points for a win, 2 points for a draw, 1 attacking bonus point for scoring four or more tries in a match and 1 defensive bonus point for losing a match by seven points or fewer.

In the event of a tie between two or more teams, the following tie-breakers were used, as directed by EPCR:

1. Where teams have played each other
  1. The club with the greater number of competition points from only matches involving tied teams.
  2. If equal, the club with the best aggregate points difference from those matches.
  3. If equal, the club that scored the most tries in those matches.
2. Where teams remain tied and/or have not played each other in the competition (i.e. are from different pools)
  1. The club with the best aggregate points difference from the pool stage.
  2. If equal, the club that scored the most tries in the pool stage.
  3. If equal, the club with the fewest players suspended in the pool stage.
  4. If equal, the drawing of lots will determine a club's ranking.

Key to colours
| Winner of each pool, advanced to quarter-finals. |
| Three highest-ranked second-place teams advanced to quarter-finals. |

=== Pool 1 ===
| Team | P | W | D | L | PF | PA | Diff | TF | TA | TB | LB | Pts |
|---|---|---|---|---|---|---|---|---|---|---|---|---|
| (England) Saracens (1) | 6 | 6 | 0 | 0 | 220 | 73 | +147 | 26 | 8 | 4 | 0 | 28 |
| (Ireland) Ulster | 6 | 4 | 0 | 2 | 169 | 109 | +60 | 21 | 12 | 2 | 0 | 18 |
| (France) Oyonnax | 6 | 1 | 0 | 5 | 99 | 218 | –119 | 10 | 30 | 1 | 2 | 7 |
| (France) Toulouse | 6 | 1 | 0 | 5 | 85 | 173 | –88 | 11 | 18 | 0 | 1 | 5 |

=== Pool 2 ===
| Team | P | W | D | L | PF | PA | Diff | TF | TA | TB | LB | Pts |
|---|---|---|---|---|---|---|---|---|---|---|---|---|
| (England) Exeter Chiefs (5) | 6 | 3 | 0 | 3 | 148 | 151 | –3 | 18 | 18 | 3 | 1 | 16 |
| (France) Bordeaux Bègles | 6 | 3 | 0 | 3 | 149 | 163 | –14 | 18 | 19 | 3 | 1 | 16 |
| (Wales) Ospreys | 6 | 3 | 0 | 3 | 138 | 142 | –4 | 12 | 16 | 2 | 2 | 16 |
| (France) Clermont | 6 | 3 | 0 | 3 | 159 | 138 | +21 | 19 | 14 | 3 | 0 | 15 |

=== Pool 3 ===
| Team | P | W | D | L | PF | PA | Diff | TF | TA | TB | LB | Pts |
|---|---|---|---|---|---|---|---|---|---|---|---|---|
| (France) Racing 92 (3) | 6 | 4 | 1 | 1 | 174 | 70 | +104 | 23 | 6 | 4 | 0 | 22 |
| (England) Northampton Saints (8) | 6 | 4 | 1 | 1 | 94 | 93 | +1 | 12 | 9 | 1 | 0 | 19 |
| (Scotland) Glasgow Warriors | 6 | 3 | 0 | 3 | 114 | 96 | +18 | 10 | 11 | 1 | 1 | 14 |
| (Wales) Scarlets | 6 | 0 | 0 | 6 | 59 | 182 | –123 | 7 | 25 | 0 | 2 | 2 |

=== Pool 4 ===
| Team | P | W | D | L | PF | PA | Diff | TF | TA | TB | LB | Pts |
|---|---|---|---|---|---|---|---|---|---|---|---|---|
| (England) Leicester Tigers (2) | 6 | 5 | 0 | 1 | 185 | 91 | +94 | 24 | 11 | 3 | 0 | 23 |
| (France) Stade Français (7) | 6 | 4 | 0 | 2 | 186 | 118 | +68 | 25 | 17 | 3 | 0 | 19 |
| (Ireland) Munster | 6 | 3 | 0 | 3 | 118 | 100 | +18 | 15 | 11 | 3 | 0 | 15 |
| (Italy) Benetton Treviso | 6 | 0 | 0 | 6 | 53 | 233 | –180 | 8 | 33 | 0 | 0 | 0 |

=== Pool 5 ===
| Team | P | W | D | L | PF | PA | Diff | TF | TA | TB | LB | Pts |
|---|---|---|---|---|---|---|---|---|---|---|---|---|
| (England) Wasps (4) | 6 | 4 | 0 | 2 | 186 | 72 | +114 | 19 | 8 | 2 | 2 | 20 |
| (France) Toulon (6) | 6 | 5 | 0 | 1 | 96 | 91 | +5 | 9 | 7 | 0 | 0 | 20 |
| (England) Bath | 6 | 2 | 0 | 4 | 88 | 131 | –43 | 7 | 8 | 0 | 2 | 10 |
| (Ireland) Leinster | 6 | 1 | 0 | 5 | 82 | 158 | –76 | 5 | 17 | 0 | 2 | 6 |

=== Pool winners & runners-up rankings ===
| Rank | Pool Winners | Pts | TF | +/− |
|---|---|---|---|---|
| 1 | (England) Saracens | 28 | 26 | +147 |
| 2 | (England) Leicester Tigers | 23 | 21 | +109 |
| 3 | (France) Racing 92 | 22 | 23 | +104 |
| 4 | (England) Wasps | 20 | 19 | +114 |
| 5 | (England) Exeter Chiefs | 16 | 18 | –3 |
| Rank | Pool Runners–up | Pts | TF | +/− |
| 6 | (France) Toulon | 20 | 9 | +5 |
| 7 | (France) Stade Français | 19 | 25 | +68 |
| 8 | (England) Northampton Saints | 19 | 12 | +1 |
| 9 | (Ireland) Ulster | 18 | 21 | +60 |
| 10 | (France) Bordeaux Bègles | 16 | 18 | –4 |

== Knock-out stage ==
=== Format ===
The four top teams hosted the quarter-finals against the four lower teams in a 1v8, 2v7, 3v6 and 4v5 format according to their ranking after the pool stages. The quarter-finals were played on the weekend of 8/9/10 April 2016.

The semi-finals were played on the weekend of 23/24 April 2016. In lieu of the draw that previously determined the semi-final pairing, EPCR announced that a fixed semi-final bracket would be set in advance, and that the home team would be designated based on "performances by clubs during the pool stages as well as the achievement of a winning a quarter-final match away from home". Semi-final matches must be played at a neutral ground in the designated home team's country.

Home country advantage was awarded as follows:

| Winner of QF | | Semi-final 1 (Home v Away) |
|---|---|---|
| 1 | 4 | 1 v 4 |
| 1 | 5 | 5 v 1 |
| 8 | 4 | 8 v 4 |
| 8 | 5 | 5 v 8 |

| Winner of QF | | Semi-final 2 (Home v Away) |
|---|---|---|
| 3 | 2 | 2 v 3 |
| 3 | 7 | 7 v 3 |
| 6 | 2 | 6 v 2 |
| 6 | 7 | 6 v 7 |

The winners of the semi-finals contested the final, at Grand Stade de Lyon, on 14 May 2016.

=== Bracket ===
Quarter-finals
2 | (England) Leicester Tigers | 41
7 | (France) Stade Français | 13
3 | (France) Racing 92 | 19
6 | (France) Toulon | 16
1 | (England) Saracens | 29
8 | (England) Northampton Saints | 20
4 | (England) Wasps | 25
5 | (England) Exeter Chiefs | 24

Semi-finals
(England) Leicester Tigers | 16
(France) Racing 92 | 19
(England) Saracens | 24
(England) Wasps | 17

Final
(France) Racing 92 | 9
(England) Saracens | 21

=== Quarter-finals ===
9 April 2016
15:15

| Wasps (England) (4) | 25–24 | (5) (England) Exeter Chiefs |
| Try: Piutau (2) 42' m, 79' c Halai 64' c Con: Gopperth (2/3) 65', 80'; Pen: Gopperth (2/3) 6', 17' | Report | Try: Waldrom (2) 32' c, 36' c Williams 48' c Con: Steenson (3/3) 33', 37', 48'; Pen: Steenson (1/1) 58' |

Ricoh Arena
Attendance: 23,866
Referee: Romain Poite (FFR)

9 April 2016
17:45

| Saracens (England) (1) | 29–20 | (8) (England) Northampton Saints |
| Try: Ashton 67' c Wyles 76' c Con: Farrell (2/2) 68', 77'; Pen: Farrell (5/5) 6', 20', 51', 61', 74' | Report | Try: K. Pisi 15' c Lawes 80' c Con: Myler (2/2) 17', 80'; Pen: Myler (2/4) 31', 55' |

Allianz Park
Attendance: 8,050
Referee: Jérôme Garcès (FFR)

10 April 2016
13:45

| Leicester Tigers (England) (2) | 41–13 | (7) (France) Stade Français |
| Try: Tuilagi 1' c Goneva (2) 30' c, 44' c Burns 33' c Fitzgerald 59' m Veainu 65' m Con: Burns (4/4) 2', 31', 34', 46'; Pen: Burns (1/1) 15' | Report | Try: Dupuy 42' c Con: Steyn (1/1) 43'; Pen: Steyn (2/3) 7', 24' |

Welford Road
Attendance: 20,866
Referee: Nigel Owens (WRU)

10 April 2016
17:15

| Racing 92 (France) (3) | 19–16 | (6) (France) Toulon |
| Try: Imhoff 2' c Con: Carter (1/1) 4'; Pen: Carter (1/1) 1'; Machenaud (3/6) 47', 51', 78' | Report | Try: Ollivon 8' c Con: Pélissié (1/1) 10'; Pen: Pélissié (3/5) 40', 43', 59' |

Stade Yves du Manoir
Attendance: 15,340
Referee: Wayne Barnes (RFU)

=== Semi-finals ===
23 April 2016
15:00

| Saracens (England) | 24–17 | (England) Wasps |
| Try: Rhodes 28' m Penalty Try 72' c Con: Farrell (1/2) 73'; Pen: Farrell (4/6) 40', 42', 46', 68' | Report | Try: Robson 1' c Johnson 75' c Con: Gopperth (2/2) 2', 76'; Pen: Gopperth (1/1) 41' |

Madejski Stadium, Reading
Attendance: 16,820
Referee: Romain Poite (FFR)

24 April 2016
15:15

| Leicester Tigers (England) | 16–19 | (France) Racing 92 |
| Try: Veainu 79' c Con: O. Williams (1/1) 79'; Pen: Burns (1/1) 28'; O. Williams (2/2) 38', 44' | Report | Try: Machenaud 4' c Con: Carter (1/1) 4'; Pen: Carter (3/3) 21', 40', 51'; Goosen (1/2) 74' |

City Ground, Nottingham
Attendance: 22,148
Referee: Nigel Owens (WRU)

=== Final ===
14 May 2016
17:45

| Racing 92 (France) | 9–21 | (England) Saracens |
| Pen: Goosen (3/3) 18', 36', 58' | Report | Pen: Farrell (7/7) 10', 25', 32', 39', 51', 76', 79' |

Grand Stade de Lyon, Lyon
Attendance: 58,017
Referee: Nigel Owens (WRU)

== Attendances ==
- Does not include the final as this was played at a neutral venues.

| Club | Home Games | Total | Average | Highest | Lowest | % Capacity |
|---|---|---|---|---|---|---|
| (England) Bath | 3 | 39,726 | 13,242 | 13,480 | 12,961 | 98% |
| (Italy) Benetton Treviso | 3 | 10,100 | 3,367 | 4,600 | 2,300 | 50% |
| (France) Bordeaux Bègles | 3 | 65,868 | 21,956 | 28,483 | 17,233 | 63% |
| (France) Clermont | 3 | 49,308 | 16,436 | 16,838 | 15,702 | 91% |
| (England) Exeter Chiefs | 3 | 31,922 | 10,641 | 11,415 | 9,577 | 87% |
| (Scotland) Glasgow Warriors | 3 | 22,439 | 7,480 | 9,063 | 6,576 | 61% |
| (England) Leicester Tigers | 5 (Note: Includes semi-final 'home game' played at the City Ground in Nottingham.) | 104,021 | 20,804 | 22,148 | 19,076 | 80% |
| (Ireland) Leinster | 3 | 76,285 | 25,428 | 44,925 | 14,569 | 85% |
| (Ireland) Munster | 3 | 58,908 | 19,636 | 22,261 | 17,763 | 77% |
| (England) Northampton Saints | 3 | 44,450 | 14,817 | 15,064 | 14,512 | 96% |
| (Wales) Ospreys | 3 | 26,181 | 8,727 | 9,479 | 7,969 | 42% |
| (France) Oyonnax | 3 | 23,500 | 7,833 | 8,800 | 7,200 | 69% |
| (France) Racing 92 | 4 | 39,137 | 9,784 | 15,340 | 6,931 | 67% |
| (England) Saracens | 5 (Note: Includes semi-final 'home game' played at the Madejski Stadium in Reading.) | 53,393 | 10,679 | 16,820 | 8,050 | 87% |
| (Wales) Scarlets | 3 | 21,102 | 7,034 | 8,512 | 5,767 | 47% |
| (France) Stade Francais | 3 | 35,678 | 11,893 | 13,820 | 9,785 | 59% |
| (France) Toulon | 3 | 38,706 | 12,902 | 13,344 | 12,590 | 84% |
| (France) Toulouse | 3 | 36,819 | 12,273 | 13,852 | 10,469 | 63% |
| (Ireland) Ulster | 3 | 48,333 | 16,111 | 17,209 | 15,108 | 89% |
| (England) Wasps | 4 | 71,754 | 17,939 | 23,866 | 11,319 | 55% |

== See also ==
- 2015–16 European Rugby Challenge Cup
