= Ian Porter (rugby union) =

Irish rugby union player

- Born: Ian Porter; 4 April 1988 (age 38) Banbridge, Northern Ireland
- Height: 1.75 m (5 ft 9 in)
- Weight: 85 kg (13 st 5 lb)
- School: Banbridge Academy
- University: Queens University, Belfast

Rugby union career
- Position: Scrum-half
- Current team: Connacht
Amateur team(s)
Years	Team	Apps	(Points)
- Belfast Harlequins
–	Banbridge		
Senior career
Years	Team	Apps	(Points)
2010–2014	Ulster	11	(0)
2014–2016	Connacht	17	(30)
- Correct as of 8 May 2016
International career
Years	Team	Apps	(Points)
2008	Ireland U20	7	(44)
- Correct as of 30 June 2008

Ian Porter (born 4 April 1988) is a rugby union player from Ireland. His main position is at Scrum-half. Porter most recently played professionally for Irish provincial side Connacht in the Pro12, and has also played for his native province of Ulster.

== Career ==
=== Ulster ===
Though he also played amateur rugby for Belfast Harlequins and Banbridge, Porter's first professional rugby club was Ulster. Porter came through Ulster's academy system, playing for the Under-19 and Under-20 sides, and in 2009 was nominated for the province's 'Academy Player of the Year' award.

In January 2010 it was announced that Porter was among nine players who had signed contracts with Ulster, meaning he would play for the senior side starting in the 2010–11 season. He made his full debut for the senior side on 11 September 2010 in the 2010–11 Celtic League, coming off the bench against Italian side Aironi. He also featured off the bench against Edinburgh and Cardiff Blues. However, having started off the season as second choice to Paul Marshall at scrum-half, the signing of Ruan Pienaar saw him drop to third choice and Porter finished the season with just three league appearances, all as a replacement.

In the 2011–12 season, Porter continued as third choice, making five replacement appearances in the 2011–12 Pro12, the league having been renamed. Porter took a one-year sabbatical from playing the following season and did not feature for Ulster, returning in 2013. He returned from his long absence with an appearance from the bench against Newport Gwent Dragons in the 2013–14 Pro12 on 6 September 2013. Porter made his first-ever senior start for the province the following week against Glasgow Warriors. Porter left Ulster at the end of the 2013–14 season.

=== Connacht ===
It was announced in May 2014 that Porter had agreed a deal Ulster's Irish rivals Connacht. He signed a two-year contract and joined the team ahead of the 2014–15 season. Porter signed as cover to Connacht's Kieran Marmion, replacing outgoing players Frank Murphy and Paul O'Donohoe.
