= Jacob Rowan =

English rugby union player

- Born: 14 January 1990 (age 36) Keighley, Yorkshire
- Height: 6 ft 1 in (1.86 m)
- Weight: 16 st 3 lb (104 kg)
- School: Bradford Grammar School
- University: University of Leeds

Rugby union career
- Position: Flanker
Senior career
Years	Team	Apps	(Points)
2008–2014	Yorkshire Carnegie	104	(95)
2014-	Gloucester Rugby	69	(20)

Jacob Rowan (born 14 January 1990) is a professional rugby union player for Gloucester. He was educated at Bradford Grammar School, and studied Chemistry at the University of Leeds.

Rowan is a former England U18 international and went on tour with the side to Argentina. In 2009 he was initially named in the England U20 squad for the Six Nations Under 20s Championship. He was also captain of the England U20's for the 2009–10 season.

In July 2012 he was named as captain for Yorkshire Carnegie, making him the youngest ever Leeds captain. His primary position is at openside flanker.

On 22 May 2014, Rowan makes his move to the Aviva Premiership to join Gloucester Rugby from the 2014–15 season.
