= Nick Wood (rugby union) =

England international rugby union player

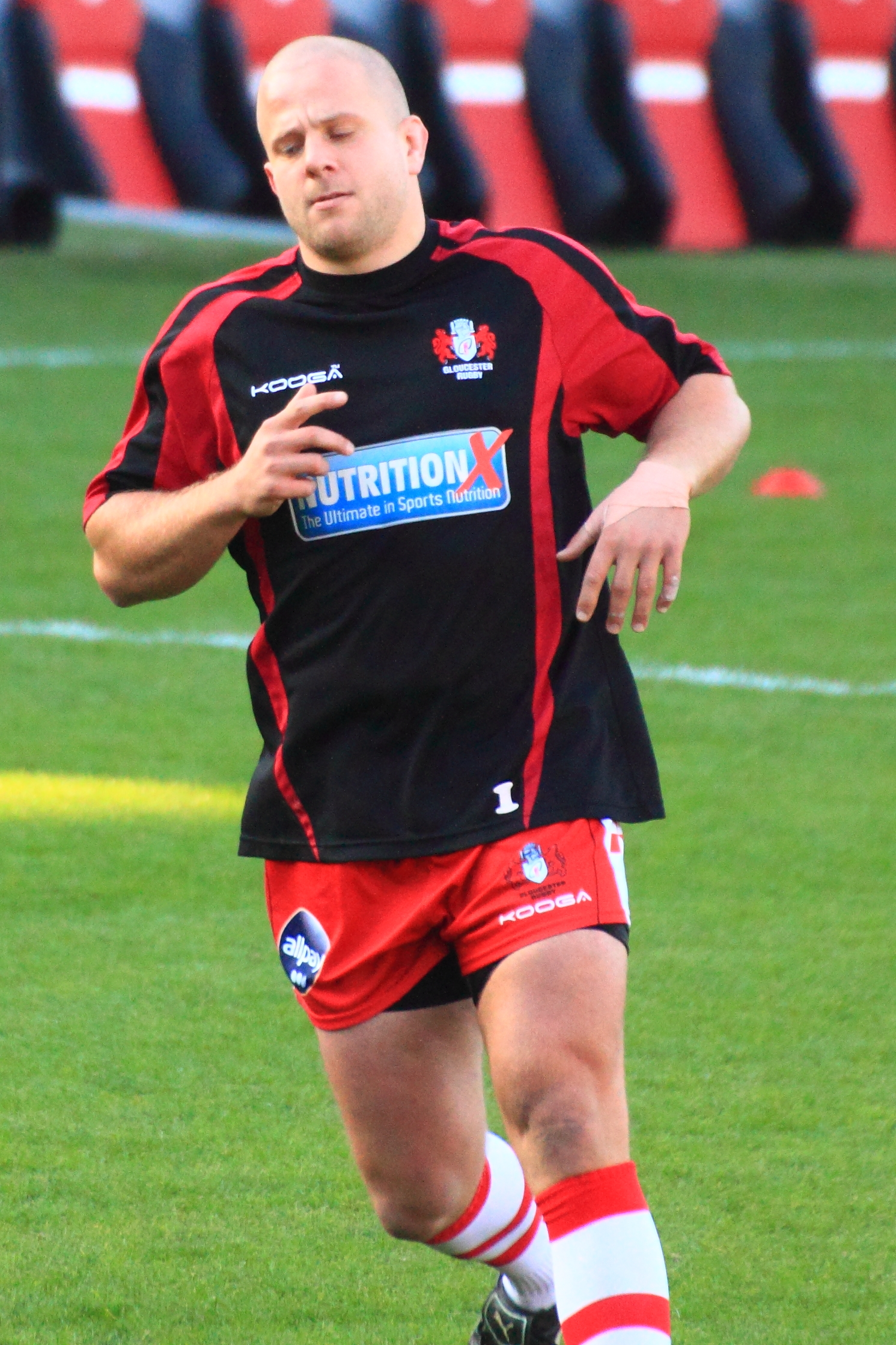
- Born: Nicholas David Wood; 9 January 1983 (age 43) Swindon, Wiltshire, England
- Height: 1.85 m (6 ft 1 in)
- Weight: 112 kg (17 st 9 lb)
- School: Radley College
- University: Brasenose College, Oxford

Rugby union career
- Position: Prop
Youth career
- Gloucester Academy
Senior career
| Years | Team | Apps | (Points) |
| 2003–2016 | Gloucester Rugby | 278 | (50) |
International career
| Years | Team | Apps | (Points) |
| 2006–2010 | England Saxons | 5 | (0) |

Nick Wood (born 9 January 1983, Swindon) is a former English rugby union footballer, who played in the Aviva Premiership for Gloucester Rugby. He played as a loosehead prop.

== Early life ==
Wood attended Radley College before joining Gloucester Rugby through their academy.

After Radley, Wood read Modern Languages at Brasenose College, Oxford.

== Club career ==
The loose-head prop was a regular on the bench during the 2003/04 campaign and made a handful of starts during the World Cup period. After a couple of consistent seasons, Wood became a regular in the first team. He made 20 starts and 6 substitute appearances during the 2006–07 season for Gloucester Rugby and he scored 1 try against Harlequins at Kingsholm. Wood played in the League final that season, losing to the Leicester Tigers. He was named in the Premiership Rugby Dream Team in the 2006-07 end of season awards.

On 12 January 2010, Wood signed a new contract with Gloucester Rugby to keep him at the club until at least 2013. On 2 April 2013, it was announced that he had signed a three-year contract extension to keep him at Gloucester until the end of the 2015–16 season.

Nick retired at the end of the 2015/6 season, after making 278 appearances for Gloucester (a club record in the professional era). He is currently Master in charge of Rugby at Radley College, Oxfordshire.

== International career ==
His performances for Gloucester Rugby earned him a call-up to the England U21s and he was an ever-present during their successful Six Nations, as well as being a regular during the U21s World Championship. In March 2006, Wood made his debut for the England Saxons, against Ireland A.

Wood was called up to the England squad for their tour of South Africa in May 2007. Wood was in line to start the first test in Bloemfontein but he had to pull out through illness thus delaying his England debut. He was called into the England Saxons side that defeated Ireland A on 1 February 2008. He was ultimately never capped for the senior team.

In the summer of 2009, Wood played for England against the Barbarians.

In the summer of 2010, Wood was selected for England Saxons to play in the Churchill Cup. On 9 June, he started in the game against Russia, where he was replaced in the second half due to injury.

== Personal life ==
He married Kate Wood in July 2010.

They have three children together, Oscar born in October 2013, Alice born in June 2016 and Effie born in November 2018.

Now a fully qualified referee with the RFU, he has referred and been touch judge in Premiership games.From Premiership Rugby web site.
