= Shaun Knight =

English rugby union player (born 1990)

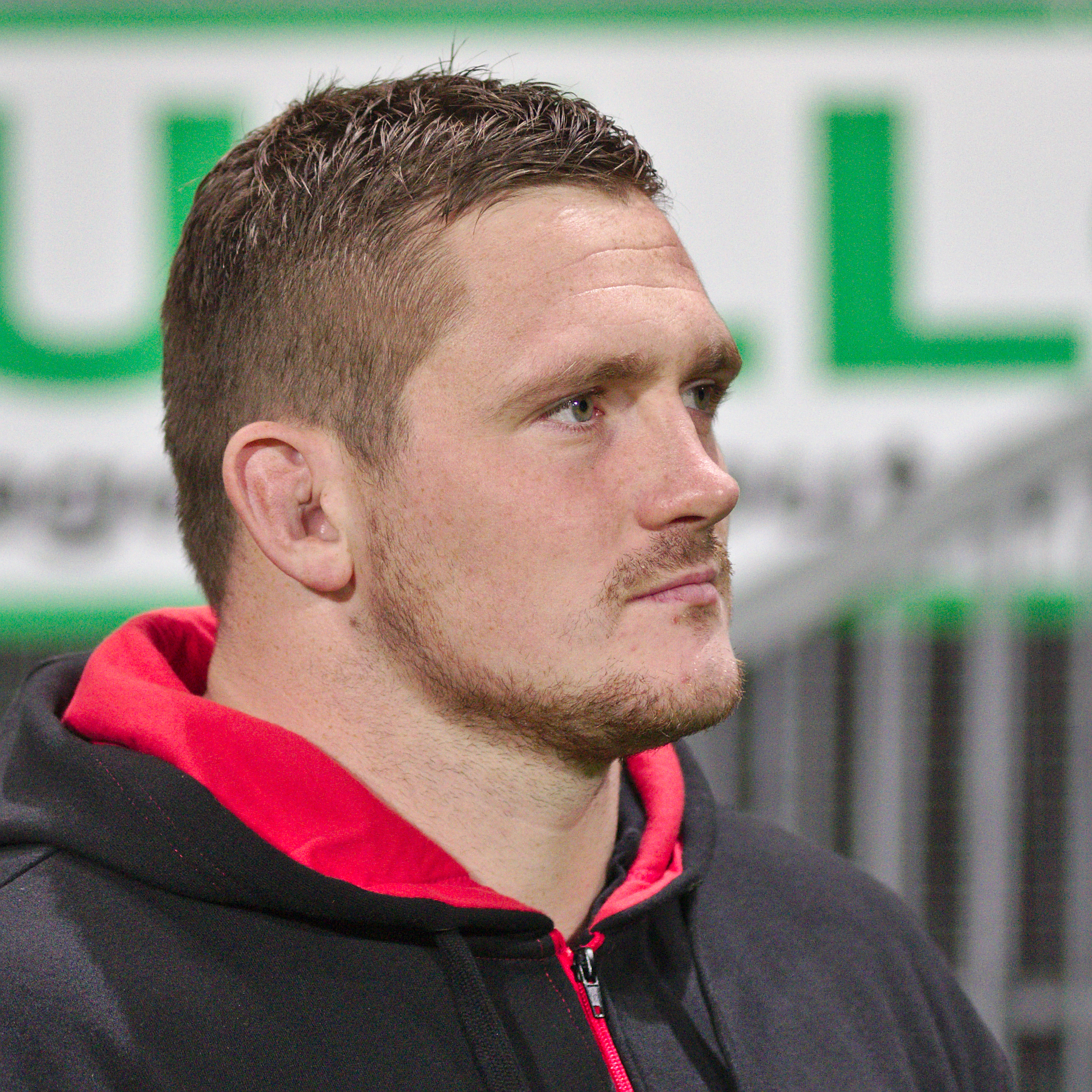
- Knight in 2014
- Born: 19 February 1990 (age 36) Gloucester, England
- Height: 1.83 m (6 ft 0 in)
- Weight: 119 kg (18 st 10 lb)
- School: Beaufort Community School
- Notable relative: Ciaran Knight (cousin)

Rugby union career
- Position: Prop
- Current team: Rouen
Senior career
Years	Team	Apps	(Points)
2010–2015	Gloucester Rugby	78	(10)
2011	→ Edinburgh	5	(0)
2015–2016	Newport Gwent Dragons	21	(0)
2016–2018	Bath	21	(0)
2018–2020	Rouen	25	(5)
2020–	Hartpury University		
International career
Years	Team	Apps	(Points)
- England Saxons

Shaun Knight (born 19 February 1990) is an English rugby union player, currently playing for Hartpury University. He plays as a prop.

Knight played for Matson, Gloucester, and as a dual-registered player for Moseley Rugby Football Club and Cinderford RFC.

He was a member of England's 2009 and 2010 Junior World Cup squads and he spent July to October 2010 with Counties Manukau in New Zealand as part of their wider ITM Cup squad.

In July 2015 Knight joined the Welsh regional team Newport Gwent Dragons.

In September 2016 he joined Bath for the remainder of the 2016–17 season, which became a permanent deal until the end of the 2017–18 season.

On 28 May 2018, he left Bath to travel to France to join Rouen in the third division Federale 1, linking up with their head coach Richard Hill.

On 27 April 2020, Knight returned to Gloucester, England to sign for Hartpury University in the RFU Championship from the 2020–21 season.
