= Henry Purdy (rugby union) =

English rugby union player

- Born: 21 May 1994 (age 32) Oxford, England
- Height: 1.89 m (6 ft 2 1/2 in)
- Weight: 97 kg (15 st 4 lb)

Rugby union career
- Position: Centre/Wing
- Current team: Agen
Senior career
Years	Team	Apps	(Points)
2012-2014	Leicester Tigers	4	(0)
2013-2014	→ Nottingham	10	(15)
2014–2019	Gloucester	83	(140)
2019	Otago	10	(15)
2019–2020	Coventry	2	(0)
2019-2023	Bristol Bears	48	(60)
2023-	Agen	9	(0)
- Correct as of 25 January 2024
International career
Years	Team	Apps	(Points)
2013–2014	England U20		

Henry Purdy (born 21 May 1994) is an English professional rugby union footballer who currently plays for Agen in the French Pro D2. He plays as a centre or wing.

Purdy signed for Gloucester Rugby for the 2014–2015 season after previously spending three years at the Leicester Tigers academy. An injury to Henry Trinder at the beginning of the season allowed Purdy extra game-time in Trinders position at outside centre. He made his Gloucester debut against the Exeter Chiefs.

On 2 August 2019, Purdy travelled to the southern hemisphere in New Zealand to join province Otago in the 2019 Mitre 10 Cup. He subsequently joined Coventry in the RFU Championship in November 2019. He joined Bristol Bears on 14 January 2020 on loan for the remainder of the 2019/20 season, and he scored a try against Gloucester on his first Premiership start for the club. After scoring a try in his next start, a 20–14 win against Northampton Saints, he signed a permanent two-year deal with Bristol.
