= Darragh Leader =

Irish rugby union player

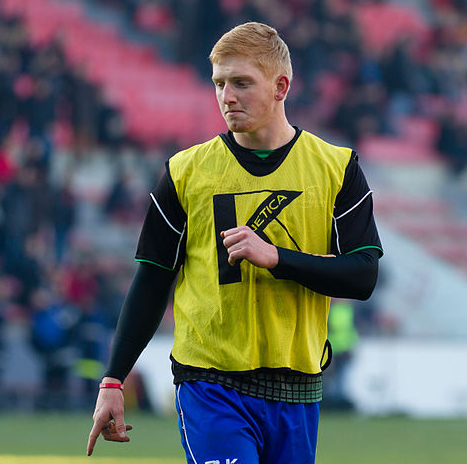
- Leader during the warm-up for a 2013–14 Heineken Cup game against Toulouse
- Born: 22 May 1993 (age 33) Galway, Ireland
- Height: 1.91 m (6 ft 3 in)
- Weight: 100 kg (15 st 10 lb)
- School: St. Joseph's Patrician College
- University: NUI Galway; Clemson University
- Notable relative: Tadhg Leader (brother)

Rugby union career
- Position(s): Fullback, Wing
- Current team: Connacht
Amateur team(s)
Years	Team	Apps	(Points)
- Galwegians
Senior career
Years	Team	Apps	(Points)
2013–2020	Connacht	90	(96)
- Correct as of 12 December 2020
International career
Years	Team	Apps	(Points)
2013	Ireland U20	6	(0)
- Correct as of 19 April 2020

Darragh Leader (born 22 May 1993) is a retired rugby player from Ireland. His primary position is at fullback, though he has also played on the wing. Leader played for Connacht in the Pro14, having come through Connacht's academy. Darragh has also joined the NFL player pathway program as a kicker/punter

== Early life ==
Born in Galway, Leader grew up in Castlegar, just outside the city. He is a former pupil of St. Joseph's Patrician College, one of the city's secondary schools, and a studied at the local university NUI Galway, where he graduated with a Commerce degree. Leader comes from a strong rugby family, with his older brother, Tadhg, being a former member of the Connacht academy, while Greg, the eldest brother, played for the province at underage level. Their parents were also heavily involved in sport, with their mother, Breda, serving as secretary for Rowing Ireland and their father, Noel, played for and served as president of the Galwegians rugby club, where Leader first played the sport.

== Career ==
=== Connacht ===
Leader signed to the Connacht academy ahead of the 2012–13 season.. While still a member of the province's academy, he made his debut for the senior side in the 2012–13 Pro12 against the previous season's champions Ospreys on 27 October 2012. Before becoming a regular for the senior side, Leader mostly played for the second tier development side, the Connacht Eagles. This included a game in the semi-professional British and Irish Cup away against Rotherham Titans in 2013, where he kicked a last minute penalty from 60 metres to win the game 27–25.

Leader made his first 2013–14 Pro12 appearance on 2 November 2013 against the Glasgow Warriors, which was his first game for the senior team in over a year, as well as his first game at the Sportsground. He started the match at outside centre, and played for the full 80 minutes. Leader made his first European appearance on 14 December 2013 at home to Toulouse in the 2013–14 Heineken Cup, coming on as a replacement. His first start in the competition came against Zebre on 11 January 2014 in a 20–3 win. Leader finished the season with 13 appearances in the league, seven of these coming as starts, and scored two tries. His first ever try for the province came in a derby with Ulster.

In April 2014, it was announced that Leader had signed a contract with Connacht. The one-year deal represents his first official contract as part of the senior team, and runs to the end of the 2014–15 season.

In the 2015/16 season Leader played a vital role in Connacht's early success at the beginning of the pro 12. He played in the first 8 games, starting 5 including the famous win over Munster in Thomond Park, their first victory there in 29 years. Leader then sustained a season ending wrist injury.

Leader was injured for the majority of the 2016/17 season following his wrist injury but returned for the final two games of the season. Leader signed another two-year contract in April of that season.

Leader played a major role in Connacht 2017/18 season playing 20 games for the province most of which were at his favoured position of Fullback. He played a pivotal role in their wins over Brive, Perpignan and Leinster that season.

In the 2018/19 season Leader was a major contribution to the success of the new coach Andy Friend which saw Connacht finish top of their table in the Challenge Cup and finishing 3rd in the newly expanded Pro 14 which included new teams South Africa.

In Leader's final season was 2019/20 at Connacht which was cut short due to Covid. He scored 17 points including one try and 6 conversions giving him 100% on the day off the tee with their famous victory over Russia in Moscow during their world cup warm up matches.

Leader still holds the record for Connacht rugby with the longest scored kick in their history of 63m versus Rotterham Titians. He finished his career at Connacht having played 95 times and amassed 96 points for his Province over an eight-year span.

=== International ===
Internationally, Leader has represented Ireland at under-age level. He was a part of the Ireland under-20 squad that went to the 2013 IRB Junior World Championship, where Ireland finished as runners up in their pool to New Zealand. Following the play-off rounds, Ireland finished the tournament in eighth place overall.

In 2014, Leader was one of five uncapped players named in Joe Schmidt's 37-man Ireland squad for the November internationals. He was selected as 24th man for one of the games

=== Coaching ===
Leader coached for two years at Clemson University in South Carolina while attaining his Master of Business Administration. He is now working as a kicking consultant alongside his brother Tadhg Leader with Leader Kicking. He was the Head coach of the Kansas City Blues for the 2023 season where they finished 4th in the USA rugby championship.

=== NFL International Player Pathway ===
Leader was selected for the NFL International Player Pathway in January 2024. The program was created to find the best athletes in the world outside of the USA. He was 1 of 15 players selected for the program. They trained at the IMG academy in Florida for two months before their Pro Day which took place on March 20, 2024, and the University of South Florida. Leader performed 23 reps on the 225lbs bench press test. The highest of any NFL IPP player and the most of any Linebacker, Defensive Back or Wide Receiver at the 2024 NFL Combine.

=== NFL Combine ===
Leader was invited to attend the 2024 NFL Combine and Specialist Showcase in Indianapolis on March 3 and 4. He was punting, holding and kicking off. He was part of the first group of Irish athletes to ever attend the NFL Combine.
