= JP Cooney =

Irish rugby player (born 1990)

- Born: 12 May 1990 (age 36) Thurles, Ireland
- Height: 1.88 m (6 ft 2 in)
- Weight: 124 kg (19 st 7 lb)
- University: University of Limerick

Rugby union career
- Position: Prop
- Current team: Garryowen
Amateur team(s)
Years	Team	Apps	(Points)
2010–	Garryowen		
Senior career
Years	Team	Apps	(Points)
2012–2018	Connacht	49	(5)
- Correct as of 28 April 2018

JP Cooney (born 12 May 1990) is an Irish rugby union player. His primary position is as a prop, and he can play on either side of the scrum. Cooney currently plays for Irish provincial side Connacht Rugby in the Pro14. He joined Connacht in 2012 from All-Ireland League club Garryowen.

== Career ==
=== Amateur career ===
Originally from Littleton in Tipperary, Cooney first played rugby for the local club Thurles RFC and attended the Thurles Christian Brothers School. He received his third level education in the University of Limerick. At under-age level, Cooney was involved with the academy of his native province of Munster and played for provincial teams at under-18, under-19 and under-20 levels. Prior to joining Connacht, Cooney played for Garryowen in Limerick, and was part of the team that won the Bateman Cup.

=== Connacht ===
Cooney joined Connacht for the 2012–13 season. In his first season with the team, he played in 4 2012-13 Pro 12 games, coming on as a replacement in each game. Cooney also made his European debut that season, coming off the bench against Biarritz in the 2012-13 Heineken Cup. Cooney also featured for the team's second tier side, the Connacht Eagles, in the semi-professional British and Irish Cup. In February 2013, Cooney extended his contract with the province to keep him there until 2015.

In the following season Cooney played a similar number of games. He made four replacement appearances in the 2013–14 Pro12, coming on away to Leinster in the RDS, home and away against Glasgow Warriors and away to Zebre in Italy. In the 2013–14 Heineken Cup, Cooney made three appearances, with these also coming from the bench. He featured against Saracens, Zebre and Toulouse.
