= Leighton Hodges =

- Born: Leighton Hodges; 25 November 1975 (age 50) Church Village, Wales

Rugby union career
Refereeing career
Years	Competition	Apps
2010–present	Pro12	
2011	2011 IRB Junior World Championship	
2012–	Test Matches	

Leighton Hodges (born 25 November 1975) is a Welsh rugby referee who mainly referees club rugby in such tournaments as the Pro14. He has refereed rugby sevens matches, making his debut in the 2008–09 IRB Sevens World Series at London and Edinburgh.

Hodges refereed 4 matches at the 2011 IRB Junior World Championship in Italy -- Italy v New Zealand, England v Scotland, Argentina v Italy, and the third place game Australia v France

He refereed his international rugby union debut in the 2012 end of year tests. There he refereed three matches, including United States v Russia on 9 November 2012 in a match that was part of the newly formed 2012 International Rugby Series, Ireland Wolfhounds v Fiji on 17 November 2012, and United States v. Romania.

He also refereed the Italy vs Fiji in 2013 where he dished out 6 yellow cards, 5 to Fiji and 1 to Italy setting a new world record in number of yellow cards shown to a team during a game.
