= 2009–10 Amlin Challenge Cup pool stage =

- Season: 2009–10 Amlin Challenge Cup
- Date: 8 October 2009 – 23 January 2010

Qualifiers
- Seed 1: (Ireland) Connacht
- Seed 2: (France) Toulon
- Seed 3: (England) London Wasps
- Seed 4: (England) Newcastle Falcons
- Seed 5: (Wales) Cardiff Blues
- Seed 6: (England) Gloucester Rugby
- Seed 7: (Wales) Scarlets
- Seed 8: (France) Bourgoin

The 2009–10 Amlin Challenge Cup pool stage was the opening stage of the 14th season of the European Challenge Cup, the second-tier competition for European rugby union clubs. It began on 8 October 2009 when Worcester Warriors hosted Montpellier and ended on 24 January 2010 with the match between Leeds Carnegie and Bourgoin.

Twenty teams participated in this phase of the competition; they were divided into five pools of four teams each, with each team playing the others home and away. Competition points were earned using the standard bonus point system. The pool winners advanced to the knockout stage, where they were joined by three entrants from the Heineken Cup pool stage. These teams then competed in a single-elimination tournament that ended with the final at the Stade Vélodrome in Marseille on 23 May 2010.

== Results ==
All times are local to the game location.

Key to colours
Winner of each pool advances to quarterfinals. Seed # in parentheses.

=== Pool 1 ===
Team	P	W	D	L	Tries for	Tries against	Try diff	Points for	Points against	Points diff	TB	LB	Pts
(France) Bourgoin (8)	6	5	0	1	16	6	+10	141	86	+55	2	1	23
(England) Leeds Carnegie	6	4	0	2	19	6	+13	160	82	+78	3	0	19
(Italy) Overmach Parma	6	2	0	4	5	17	−12	78	145	−67	0	0	8
(Romania) București Oaks	6	1	0	5	5	16	−11	70	136	−66	0	3	7

9 October 2009
19:30

Bourgoin (France)	29–19	(England) Leeds Carnegie

Stade Pierre Rajon, Bourgoin

10 October 2009
13:00

București Oaks (Romania)	21–9	(Italy) Overmach Parma

Stadionul Naţional de Rugby, Bucharest

17 October 2009
13:00

București Oaks (Romania)	19–21	(France) Bourgoin

Stadionul Naţional de Rugby, Bucharest

18 October 2009
15:00

Leeds Carnegie (England)	32–13	(Italy) Overmach Parma

Headingley, Leeds

12 December 2009
13:00

București Oaks (Romania)	6–10	(England) Leeds Carnegie

Stadionul Naţional de Rugby, Bucharest

12 December 2009
14:00

Overmach Parma (Italy)	14–9	(France) Bourgoin

Stadio XXV Aprile, Parma

17 December 2009
19:30

Bourgoin (France)	31–10	(Italy) Overmach Parma

Stade Pierre Rajon, Bourgoin

20 December 2009
15:00

Leeds Carnegie (England)	47–0	(Romania) București Oaks

Headingley, Leeds

14 January 2010
19:30

Bourgoin (France)	33–15	(Romania) București Oaks

Stade Pierre Rajon, Bourgoin

16 January 2010
14:30

Overmach Parma (Italy)	16–38	(England) Leeds Carnegie

Stadio XXV Aprile, Parma

23 January 2010
14:30

Overmach Parma (Italy)	16–9	(Romania) București Oaks

Stadio XXV Aprile, Parma

24 January 2010
15:00

Leeds Carnegie (England)	9–18	(France) Bourgoin

Headingley, Leeds

=== Pool 2 ===
Team	P	W	D	L	Tries for	Tries against	Try diff	Points for	Points against	Points diff	TB	LB	Pts
(Ireland) Connacht (1)	6	6	0	0	28	5	+23	199	63	+136	2	0	26
(France) Montpellier	6	4	0	2	18	10	+8	158	92	+66	2	1	19
(England) Worcester Warriors	6	2	0	4	18	8	+10	140	83	+57	2	3	13
(Spain) Olympus Madrid	6	0	0	6	4	45	−41	44	303	−269	0	0	0

8 October 2009
19:45

Worcester Warriors (England)	17–22	(France) Montpellier

Sixways Stadium, Worcester

9 October 2009
18:30

Connacht (Ireland)	46–6	(Spain) Olympus Madrid

Galway Sportsgrounds, Galway

16 October 2009
20:00

Montpellier (France)	19–22	(Ireland) Connacht

Stade Yves-du-Manoir, Montpellier

17 October 2009
16:30

Olympus Madrid (Spain)	5–38	(England) Worcester Warriors

Estadio Nacional Complutense, Madrid

11 December 2009
20:00

Montpellier (France)	57–24	(Spain) Olympus Madrid

Stade Yves-du-Manoir, Montpellier

11 December 2009
15:00

Worcester Warriors (England)	21–26	(Ireland) Connacht

Sixways Stadium, Worcester

18 December 2009
19:00

Connacht (Ireland)	19–7	(England) Worcester Warriors

Galway Sportsgrounds, Galway

19 December 2009
16:00

Olympus Madrid (Spain)	6–42	(France) Montpellier

Estadio Nacional Complutense, Madrid

15 January 2010
19:00

Connacht (Ireland)	20–10	(France) Montpellier

Galway Sportsgrounds, Galway

16 January 2010
15:00

Worcester Warriors (England)	54–3	(Spain) Olympus Madrid

Sixways Stadium, Worcester

22 January 2010
20:00

Montpellier (France)	8–3	(England) Worcester Warriors

Stade Yves-du-Manoir, Montpellier

23 January 2010
16:00

Olympus Madrid (Spain)	0–66	(Ireland) Connacht

Estadio Nacional Complutense, Madrid

=== Pool 3 ===
Team	P	W	D	L	Tries for	Tries against	Try diff	Points for	Points against	Points diff	TB	LB	Pts
(France) Toulon (2)	6	5	0	1	27	7	+20	218	88	+130	3	0	23
(England) Saracens	6	5	0	1	17	6	+11	184	83	+101	2	0	22
(France) Castres Olympique	6	2	0	4	24	12	+12	173	127	+46	2	1	11
(Italy) Rovigo	6	0	0	6	3	46	−43	41	318	−277	0	0	0

9 October 2009
19:00

Castres Olympique (France)	17–33	(France) Toulon

Stade Pierre-Antoine, Castres

11 October 2009
15:00

Saracens (England)	36–12	(Italy) Rovigo

Vicarage Road, Watford

15 October 2009
20:45

Toulon (France)	31–23	(England) Saracens

Stade Mayol, Toulon

17 October 2009
15:00

Rovigo (Italy)	11–76	(France) Castres Olympique

Stadio Mario Battaglini, Rovigo

11 December 2009
19:00

Castres Olympique (France)	9–23	(England) Saracens

Stade Pierre-Antoine, Castres

11 December 2009
19:30

Toulon (France)	73–3	(Italy) Rovigo

Stade Mayol, Toulon

19 December 2009
20:00

Saracens (England)	18–14	(France) Castres Olympique

Vicarage Road, Watford

20 December 2009
14:00

Rovigo (Italy)	7–30	(France) Toulon

Stadio Mario Battaglini, Rovigo

14 January 2010
19:45

Saracens (England)	28–9	(France) Toulon

Vicarage Road, Watford

15 January 2010
19:00

Castres Olympique (France)	47–0	(Italy) Rovigo

Stade Pierre-Antoine, Castres

23 January 2010
15:00

Rovigo (Italy)	8–56	(England) Saracens

Stadio Mario Battaglini, Rovigo

23 January 2010
20:45

Toulon (France)	42–10	(France) Castres Olympique

Stade Mayol, Toulon

=== Pool 4 ===
Team	P	W	D	L	Tries for	Tries against	Try diff	Points for	Points against	Points diff	TB	LB	Pts
(England) London Wasps (3)	6	5	0	1	21	3	+18	176	69	+107	2	1	23
(France) Bayonne	6	4	0	2	23	4	−19	184	73	+111	2	1	19
(France) Racing Métro	6	3	0	3	22	7	+15	177	85	+92	2	2	16
(Italy) Rugby Roma Olimpic	6	0	0	6	1	53	−52	28	338	−310	0	0	0

9 October 2009
19:30

Bayonne (France)	61–3	(Italy) Rugby Roma Olimpic

Stade Jean Dauger, Bayonne

11 October 2009
15:00

London Wasps (England)	18–13	(France) Racing Métro

Adams Park, High Wycombe

17 October 2009
15:00

Rugby Roma Olimpic (Italy)	0–57	(England) London Wasps

Stadio delle Tre Fontane, Rome

17 October 2009
20:45

Racing Métro (France)	16–20	(France) Bayonne

Stade Olympique Yves-du-Manoir, Colombes

12 December 2009
15:00

London Wasps (England)	22–18	(France) Bayonne

Adams Park, High Wycombe

12 December 2009
20:45

Racing Métro (France)	62–0	(Italy) Rugby Roma Olimpic

Stade Olympique Yves-du-Manoir, Colombes

17 December 2009
20:45

Bayonne (France)	3–12	(England) London Wasps

Stade Jean Dauger, Bayonne

19 December 2009
14:30

Rugby Roma Olimpic (Italy)	3–53	(France) Racing Métro

Stadio delle Tre Fontane, Rome

14 January 2010
20:00

London Wasps (England)	50–16	(Italy) Rugby Roma Olimpic

Adams Park, High Wycombe

16 January 2010
20:45

Bayonne (France)	27–14	(France) Racing Métro

Stade Jean Dauger, Bayonne

21 January 2010
20:45

Racing Métro (France)	19–17	(England) London Wasps

Stade Olympique Yves-du-Manoir, Colombes

23 January 2010
14:30

Rugby Roma Olimpic (Italy)	6–55	(France) Bayonne

Stadio delle Tre Fontane, Rome

=== Pool 5 ===
Team	P	W	D	L	Tries for	Tries against	Try diff	Points for	Points against	Points diff	TB	LB	Pts
(England) Newcastle Falcons (4)	6	5	0	1	16	6	+10	146	77	+69	2	1	23
(France) Montauban	6	5	0	1	13	9	+4	132	96	+36	1	0	21
(France) Albi	6	2	0	4	13	14	−1	117	137	−20	2	2	12
(Italy) Petrarca Padova	6	0	0	6	9	22	−13	95	180	−85	0	1	1

9 October 2009
20:00

Albi (France)	7–17	(France) Montauban

Stadium Municipal, Albi

10 October 2009
15:00

Petrarca Padova (Italy)	27–29	(England) Newcastle Falcons

Stadio Plebiscito, Padua

16 October 2009
20:30

Montauban (France)	27–10	(Italy) Petrarca Padova

Stade Sapiac, Montauban

18 October 2009
15:00

Newcastle Falcons (England)	45–3	(France) Albi

Kingston Park, Newcastle

10 December 2009
19:45

Newcastle Falcons (England)	17–6	(France) Montauban

Kingston Park, Newcastle

12 December 2009
15:00

Petrarca Padova (Italy)	16–35	(France) Albi

Stadio Plebiscito, Padua

18 December 2009
20:30

Montauban (France)	24–19	(England) Newcastle Falcons

Stade Sapiac, Montauban

20 December 2009
14:00

Albi (France)	38–16	(Italy) Petrarca Padova

Stadium Municipal, Albi

15 January 2010
20:00

Albi (France)	14–16	(England) Newcastle Falcons

Stadium Municipal, Albi

16 January 2010
15:00

Petrarca Padova (Italy)	23–31	(France) Montauban

Stadio Plebiscito, Padua

22 January 2010
19:30

Montauban (France)	27–20	(France) Albi

Stade Sapiac, Montauban

22 January 2010
20:00

Newcastle Falcons (England)	20–3	(Italy) Petrarca Padova

Kingston Park, Newcastle

== Seeding ==
- Bare numbers indicate Challenge quarterfinal seeding.
- Numbers with "HC" indicate Heineken Cup 3rd-5th Runners-Up.

Seeds	Top 4 Pool Winners	Pts	TF	+/−
1	(Ireland) Connacht	26	28	+136
2	(France) Toulon	23	27	+130
3	(England) London Wasps	23	21	+108
4	(England) Newcastle Falcons	23	16	+69
Non-Seeds	(Worst Pool Winner and HC Runners-up)	Pts	TF	+/−
5HC	(Wales) Cardiff Blues	18	14	+45
6HC	(England) Gloucester	17	12	-10
7HC	(Wales) Scarlets	17	12	-31
8	(France) Bourgoin	23	15	+55

== See also ==
- European Challenge Cup
- 2009–10 Heineken Cup
