= Michael Swift (rugby union) =

English rugby union player

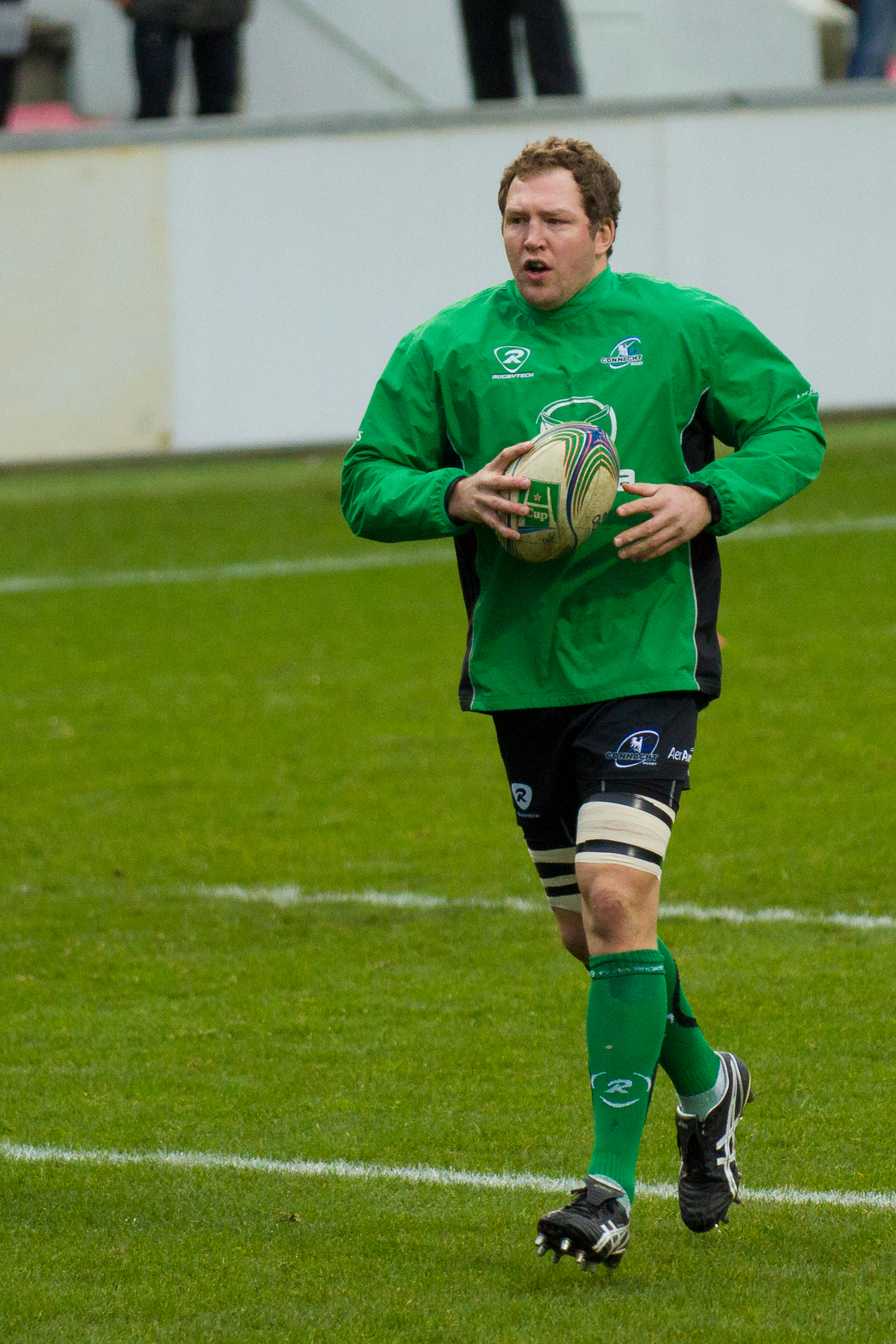
- Born: 18 October 1977 (age 49) London, England
- Height: 1.96 m (6 ft 5 in)
- Weight: 123 kg (19 st 5 lb)
- School: London Oratory School
- University: Loughborough University

Rugby union career
- Position(s): Lock, Flanker
Amateur team(s)
Years	Team	Apps	(Points)
2000–2015	Galwegians		
Senior career
Years	Team	Apps	(Points)
1997–1999	Richmond	8	(0)
1999–2000	Leeds Tykes	2	(10)
2000–2015	Connacht	269	(60)
- Correct as of 16 May 2015
International career
Years	Team	Apps	(Points)
- England U16
–	England U18		

Michael Swift (born 18 October 1977) is an English former rugby union player. Swift played rugby professionally for 17 years and spent most of his career with Irish provincial team Connacht. He retired from playing in 2015. Though he originally played both as a flanker and a lock, Swift played almost exclusively in the second row later in his career.

At the time of his retirement Swift was the most-capped Connacht player of all time and held the record for appearances in the Celtic League/Pro12. These records were later broken by his long-time Connacht teammate John Muldoon.

== Career ==
=== Early career ===
==== Richmond ====
Swift started playing rugby in 1989, while a pupil at the London Oratory School. He represented Middlesex and England U16s during his time at school. His first professional club was Richmond, which he joined at 19 while attending Loughborough University. He primarily played as a flanker. Swift did not feature for the team in the 1997–98 Premiership, but made two appearances in the 1997–98 European Challenge Cup. In the 1998–99 Premiership, Swift made six appearances for the team, four of these coming as starts.

The club had been bought by financial markets trader and Monaco tax exile Ashley Levett, who turned the club into one of the first professional rugby union teams in England. Levitt bought in big names to push the club up the leagues, such as Ben Clarke from Bath Rugby, the first £1 million signing. Despite the crowds and revenues from competition, Levett was continually financing the team, and he eventually put the club in administration in March 1999. The professional side of Richmond was eventually merged into London Irish, but during the period of uncertainty following the onset of administration, a number of players left the club.

==== Leeds Tykes ====
Following the administration of Richmond, Swift joined another English team, this time Leeds Tykes. Swift featured for Leeds in the 1999–2000 Second Division as the Tykes finished second to Rotherham by a margin of four points, missing out on promotion. Swift also played for the team in that season's Tetley's Bitter Cup, scoring two tries in two games.

=== Connacht ===
==== Early seasons (2000–2003) ====
Swift was recruited by his former coach at Richmond, John Kingston, to join the Connacht-based club Galwegians in June 2000. He made his first appearance for the Connacht provincial team against Ulster in the same year, while still playing for Galwegians in the All-Ireland League. Swift also played for Connacht in the 2000–01 European Challenge Cup, making his European debut for the province on 7 October 2000 as a replacement against Béziers at home, before starting in both the return match on 13 January 2001 and the game against Neath the following week.

The following season saw the foundation of a new domestic league for Connacht, with teams from Scotland and Wales uniting with the Irish provinces to create the Celtic League. The competition featured 16 teams, split into two pools of eight, with teams from the top half of each pool advancing to the knockout rounds. In the inaugural Celtic League, Swift made four appearances, all of them coming as starts, as Connacht finished second to Irish rivals Munster in Pool B, before losing to Glasgow in the quarter-finals. In the 2001–02 Challenge Cup, Swift played three games, featuring as a replacement against Sale Sharks, before starting against Rugby Roma and Narbonne.

In the 2002–03 Celtic League, Swift made six appearances before Connacht were eliminated in the quarter-finals by Munster, all but one of these appearances coming as starts. In the 2002–03 Challenge Cup, Swift played in four of the team's six games, starting in three of them, as Connacht reached the quarter-finals, playing both legs in the ties against Narbonne and Pontypridd.

==== Under Michael Bradley (2003–2010) ====
The 2003–04 season saw Connacht appoint a new coach, with Michael Bradley taking charge of the side. That year's Celtic League saw a change in the competition's format. Following the formation of regional rugby teams in Wales, the competition was organised as a round-robin league, with each team playing the other once at home and once away. Under this new 22-game structure, Swift featured 17 times for Connacht, starting on all but two of these occasions, as the province finished ninth. In Europe, however, Connacht experienced their greatest level of success in professional competition, reaching the last four of the 2003–04 Challenge Cup. The team beat Béziers and Pau on aggregate, before beating Narbonne in both legs in the quarter-finals. Swift started in all six of these games, and scored a try in the first leg of the tie against Pau. Swift also started both legs of the semi-final against Harlequins, as Connacht came within touching distance of the final, only for a Will Greenwood try, 12 minutes from time in the second leg to cost them their place in the decider, which Harlequins went on to win.

The 2004–05 season saw the team slip further in the league, but maintain their strong European form. Swift played 14 of 20 games in the 2004–05 Celtic League as it was reduced to an 11 team competition. He also scored one try in the league as Connacht finished one place from the bottom of the table. In the 2004–05 Challenge Cup, Connacht again reached the semi-finals, overcoming Narbonne, Montpellier and Grenoble in the process. Swift again featured in all of the games. In the semi-finals, however, Connacht were again knocked out by the eventual champions, this time Sale Sharks.

The next season saw Swift continue to be a regular player in European competition, but feature less prominently in the league. He made 15 appearances in the 2005–06 Celtic League, but over half of these came as a replacement. Connacht finished the season level on points with last-placed Glasgow Warriors. Meanwhile, the 2005–06 Challenge Cup saw change's to the competition structure, with the addition of pool stages followed by single-leg knockout games. Connacht finished second in their group to Worcester Warriors, with Swift featuring in four of the team's six games. This was enough to see the team through to the quarter-finals, where they faced Newcastle Falcons. Swift was used as a replacement against Newcastle, but he was sin-binned during the match as Connacht crashed out.

In the 2006–07 Celtic League Swift featured in 14 of the team's 20 games, starting in four of them as Connacht finished above only Border Reivers, a team that was disbanded at the end of the season. Swift also played in four 2006–07 European Challenge Cup matches. He started in each of these games, playing Montpellier twice, before facing Bath and Harlequins, but couldn't prevent Connacht being eliminated at the pool stages. The game against Montpellier was Swift's hundredth appearance for Connacht, making the fifth player to reach the milestone for the province. With the number of competing teams reduced to ten for the 2007–08 Celtic League Swift featured in 12 games for the province, starting all but two of these, as Connacht finished bottom of the table. Swift also started in all six of Connacht's 2007–08 Challenge Cup games, playing at home and away against Brive, El Salvador and Newcastle Falcons, scoring a try against El Salvador. Connacht finished third in the group and were eliminated.

Swift made eight starts, along with six appearances as a replacement in the 2008–09 Celtic League, as Connacht continued to struggle domestically. The team finished in last place, 13 points adrift of Newport Gwent Dragons in ninth. Connacht's European form improved, however. Grouped with London Irish, Dax and Rovigo in the 2008–09 Challenge Cup, the team finished second in their pool. Swift played in each of these pool games, before featuring in the quarter-final against Northampton Saints. Connacht were ultimately beaten 42–13 by the Saints.

The 2009–10 season was Bradley's last in charge of the side, and he announced his attention to leave the province early in the season. Swift made 12 appearances in the 2009–10 Celtic League, starting in nine of these games and scoring a try. Connacht again finished in last place. In the 2009–10 Challenge Cup, Swift played in all of Connacht's group games, starting in four and coming on as a replacement in the other two. He also scored two tries against Olympus Madrid. Connacht won all of their group games to enter the knock-out as top seeds. Swift started in the province's quarter-final win over Bourgoin, scoring a crucial try in a three-point victory. In the semi-final Connacht faced a Toulon side featuring Jonny Wilkinson, and were beaten by a score of 12–19. In December 2009, Swift became the most capped Connacht player of all time, overtaking Eric Elwood with 169 appearances.

==== Eric Elwood as coach (2010–2013) ====
The 2010–11 season saw Swift's former teammate Eric Elwood take over as coach, replacing the outgoing Bradley. The 2010–11 Celtic League saw two teams from Italy introduced to the competition, bringing the number of teams back up to twelve. Swift started 19 games and scored a try as Elwood set about improving the team's league form. Connacht finished the season above both Italian teams and Glasgow Warriors in ninth place. As Elwood helped the team climb up the domestic league, they did not fare as well in the 2010–11 Challenge Cup as the previous season. Swift featured in all six games, starting five of them, as Connacht were knocked out in the pool stages, finishing second in their group to the eventual winners of the tournament, Harlequins.

The 2011–12 season saw changes for Connacht both domestically and in Europe. Connacht competed at the highest level of European club rugby, qualifying for the Heineken Cup for the first time. This was due to Leinster winning the 2011 Heineken Cup Final. Competition rules introduced in the 2010–11 season, granted the winners of both the Heineken Cup and the European Challenge Cup an automatic berth in the following year's Heineken Cup. As Leinster had qualified through performance in the 2010–11 Celtic League, this place was passed on to another team from the same country, with Connacht the beneficiaries. Domestically, the Celtic League was renamed, becoming the Pro12, due to the previous season's introduction of Italian teams.

Early in the season, Swift reached another milestone in becoming the first player to make 200 appearances for Connacht, when he played against Edinburgh on 16 September 2011. He made a total of 18 appearances in the 2011–12 Pro12, starting each of the games as Connacht finished eighth. On 2 March 2012, Swift became the most capped player in the history of the Pro12/Celtic League, playing in his 140th game in the competition. Swift made his first appearance at the very top level of European club rugby on 11 November 2011, when he started against Harlequins in the 2011–12 Heineken Cup, a game which Connacht lost 25–17. He also started against Toulouse both home and away, but did not feature in either of the games against Bath, with Connacht losing on each occasion. Swift started against on 20 January 2012, however, with Connacht managing an upset, beating Harlequins 9–8 in the Sportsground, preventing the Premiership club from topping the group, and knocking them down into the Challenge Cup.

Ahead of the 2012–13 season, Swift was given the honorary role of Club Captain by the province in recognition of his service, with teammate Gavin Duffy continuing as captain on the field. Swift made 19 appearances in the 2012–13 Pro12, with just two of these coming as a replacement. Connacht finished the season in the same position as the year before, coming in eighth. At European level, Connacht played in the Heineken Cup again in the 2012–13 season, because of Leinster's second Heineken Cup win in a row the year before. The team won three of their pool matches, with the victories coming in the home and away ties with Italian side Zebre, along with a victory at home over 2009–10 finalists and 2011–12 Challenge Cup winners Biarritz. Swift started four of the team's six games, but missed both games against Biarritz. Elwood had announced his intention to leave his post in October 2012, and departed at the end of the season.

==== Final seasons (2013–2015) ====
Swift signed a contract with Connacht for the 2013–14 season, taking his service at the province up to May 2014. Ahead of his fourteenth season with the province, Swift was named one of the team's joint captains, and started out the season sharing the captaincy with both Gavin Duffy and John Muldoon. After a poor run of form culminating in a 43–10 defeat against Edinburgh, Craig Clarke was made Connacht's team captain with Swift and the others continuing to "lead off the field." Swift made 18 appearances in the 2013–14 Pro12, with half of these coming as starts. He also scored tries against Edinburgh and Newport Gwent Dragons, as Connacht ultimately finished tenth. With Leinster having won the 2012–13 European Challenge Cup, Connacht competed in the Heineken Cup again in the 2013–14 season. Swift started for and captained Connacht in the first two games against Saracens and Zebre, and came on as a replacement in a famous away victory over Toulouse. Swift did not feature in the return match against Toulouse, but came on as a replacement in the second match against Zebre, before starting the final group game against Saracens.

In April 2014, Swift signed another new contract with Connacht. The one-year deal ran until summer 2015, taking Swift's service with Connacht into its fifteenth season. Swift made his first appearance of the season on 26 September 2014 against Glasgow Warriors in the league, and featured in three 2014–15 Rugby Challenge Cup games, but Swift more often featured for the Connacht Eagles during the course of the year. In February 2015, while recovering from a leg fracture, Swift announced that he would retire at the end of the season. He made his 269th and final Connacht appearance against Ospreys on 16 May 2015, when he came on as a replacement for Eoin McKeon after 65 minutes.
