= 2009–10 European Challenge Cup =

2009–10 Amlin Challenge Cup

Tournament details
- Countries: England; France; Ireland; Italy; Romania; Spain; Wales
- Tournament format(s): Round-robin and Knockout
- Date: 9 October 2009 to 23 May 2010

Tournament statistics
- Teams: 20
- Matches played: 67
- Top point scorer(s): Jimmy Gopperth (Newcastle) (74 points)
- Top try scorer(s): Tom Varndell (Wasps) (10 tries)

Final
- Venue: Stade Vélodrome, Marseille
- Attendance: 48,990
- Champions: (Wales) Cardiff Blues (1st title)
- Runners-up: (France) Toulon

The 2009–10 Amlin Challenge Cup was the 14th season of the European Challenge Cup, the annual rugby union European club competition for clubs from six nations in European rugby. It started on 8 October 2009 at Sixways Stadium in Worcester with Worcester Warriors hosting Montpellier, and ended with the final at Stade Vélodrome in Marseille on 23 May 2010. The reigning champions were Northampton Saints, who did not defend their title as they qualified for the 2009–10 Heineken Cup. Cardiff Blues won the trophy after a 28–21 win against Toulon.

== Teams ==
Five English teams and eight French teams competed because an English team – Leicester Tigers – progressed farther in the 2008–09 Heineken Cup than any French or Italian team.

Other countries will have their usual number of teams: Ireland one, Romania one and one from Spain.

France	England	Italy	Ireland	Romania	Spain
Albi; Bayonne; Bourgoin; Castres Olympique; Montauban; Montpellier; Racing Métro; Toulon	Leeds Carnegie; London Wasps; Newcastle Falcons; Saracens; Worcester Warriors	Overmach Parma; Petrarca Padova; Rovigo; Roma Olimpic	Connacht	București Oaks	Olympus Madrid

== Pool stage ==
The draw for the pool stages took place on 15 June 2009. The seeding system was the same as for the 2008–09 tournament. The 20 competing teams were ranked based on past Heineken Cup and European Challenge Cup performance, with each pool receiving one team from each Tier. The requirement to have only one team per country in each pool was, however, still apply (with the exception of the inclusion of the sixth, seventh and eight French teams).

Beginning with this season's competition, only the pool winners advanced to the knockout stage. They were joined by three clubs from the 2009–10 Heineken Cup, specifically the third through fifth highest-ranking teams that finished second in their pool (the top two second-place teams entered the Heineken Cup knockout stage).

=== Team seedings ===
Seeding was determined by the teams' position in the ERC Rankings at the time of the pool draw in June 2009.

Rank	Team	Total points	2008–09 points	2007–08 points	2006–07 points	2005–06 points
7	London Wasps	19	3	2	11	3
12	Saracens	14	2	7	2	3
19	Bourgoin	8	3	2	1	2
22	Worcester	7	2	3	0	2
25	Newcastle	6	1	2	1	2
27	Castres	5	1	1	2	1
30	Leeds	4	0	1	0	3
31	Calvisano	3	1	0	1	1
34	Connacht	2	1	0	0	1
35	Montauban	1	1	0	0	0
37	Montpellier	1	0	1	0	0
38	Overmach Parma	1	0	0	1	0
39	Bayonne	1	0	0	0	1

Key to colours
Winner of each pool, advanced to quarterfinals Along with 3rd, 4th and 5th best runners up in the Heineken Cup group stages. Seed # in parentheses

=== Pool 1 ===
Team	P	W	D	L	Tries for	Tries against	Try diff	Points for	Points against	Points diff	TB	LB	Pts
(France) Bourgoin	6	5	0	1	16	6	+10	141	86	+55	2	1	23
(England) Leeds Carnegie	6	4	0	2	19	6	+13	160	82	+78	3	0	19
(Italy) Overmach Parma	6	2	0	4	5	17	−12	78	145	−67	0	0	8
(Romania) București Oaks	6	1	0	5	5	16	−11	70	136	−66	0	3	7

=== Pool 2 ===
Team	P	W	D	L	Tries for	Tries against	Try diff	Points for	Points against	Points diff	TB	LB	Pts
(Ireland) Connacht	6	6	0	0	28	5	+23	199	63	+136	2	0	26
(France) Montpellier	6	4	0	2	18	10	+8	158	92	+66	2	1	19
(England) Worcester Warriors	6	2	0	4	18	8	+10	140	83	+57	2	3	13
(Spain) Olympus Madrid	6	0	0	6	4	45	−41	44	303	−269	0	0	0

=== Pool 3 ===
Team	P	W	D	L	Tries for	Tries against	Try diff	Points for	Points against	Points diff	TB	LB	Pts
(France) Toulon	6	5	0	1	27	7	+20	218	88	+130	3	0	23
(England) Saracens	6	5	0	1	17	6	+11	184	83	+101	2	0	22
(France) Castres Olympique	6	2	0	4	24	12	+12	173	127	+46	2	1	11
(Italy) Rovigo	6	0	0	6	3	46	−43	41	318	−277	0	0	0

=== Pool 4 ===
Team	P	W	D	L	Tries for	Tries against	Try diff	Points for	Points against	Points diff	TB	LB	Pts
(England) London Wasps	6	5	0	1	21	3	+18	176	69	+107	2	1	23
(France) Bayonne	6	4	0	2	23	4	−19	184	73	+111	2	1	19
(France) Racing Métro	6	3	0	3	22	7	+15	177	85	+92	2	2	16
(Italy) Rugby Roma Olimpic	6	0	0	6	1	53	−52	28	338	−310	0	0	0

=== Pool 5 ===
Team	P	W	D	L	Tries for	Tries against	Try diff	Points for	Points against	Points diff	TB	LB	Pts
(England) Newcastle Falcons	6	5	0	1	16	6	+10	146	77	+69	2	1	23
(France) Montauban	6	5	0	1	13	9	+4	132	96	+36	1	0	21
(France) Albi	6	2	0	4	13	14	−1	117	137	−20	2	2	12
(Italy) Petrarca Padova	6	0	0	6	9	22	−13	95	180	−85	0	1	1

== Seeding ==
- Bare numbers indicate Challenge quarterfinal seeding.
- Numbers with "HC" indicate Heineken Cup 3rd-5th Runners-Up.

Seeds	Top 4 Pool Winners	Pts	TF	+/−
1	(Ireland) Connacht	26	28	+136
2	(France) Toulon	23	27	+130
3	(England) London Wasps	23	21	+108
4	(England) Newcastle Falcons	23	16	+69
Non-Seeds	(Worst Pool Winner and HC Runners-up)	Pts	TF	+/−
5HC	(Wales) Cardiff Blues	18	14	+45
6HC	(England) Gloucester	17	12	-10
7HC	(Wales) Scarlets	17	12	-31
8	(France) Bourgoin	23	15	+55

== Knock-out stage ==
=== Quarter-finals ===
10 April 2010
13:00

Connacht (Ireland)	23–20	(France) Bourgoin
Try: Swift 17' c Muldoon 36' c Con: Keatley (2/2); Pen: Nikora (2/2) 66', 73'; Drop: Nikora (1/1) 79'	Report	Try: Kopelani 30' c Senio 59' c Con: Boyet (2/2); Pen: Boyet (2/5) 39', 44'

Galway Sportsgrounds, Galway
Attendance: 3,500
Referee: Andrew Small (England)

10 April 2010
21:00

Toulon (France)	38–12	(Wales) Scarlets
Try: Marienval (2) 29' c, 41' c Sinzelle 72' m Williams 76' m Missoup 80'+1' m Con: Wilkinson (2/3); Pen: Wilkinson (3/3) 9', 36', 40'	Report	Pen: S. Jones (4/6) 11', 23', 44', 47'

Stade Mayol, Toulon
Attendance: 12,600
Referee: Peter Fitzgibbon (Ireland)

11 April 2010
14:00

London Wasps (England)	42–26	(England) Gloucester
Try: Jacobs 6' c Betsen 22' c Varndell (3) 33' c, 72' m, 80' c Con: Cipriani (4/5); Pen: Cipriani (3/3) 18', 40', 43'	Report	Try: Eustace 25' c Sharples 77' c Con: Robinson (2/2); Pen: Robinson (4/4) 5', 10', 38', 56'

Adams Park, High Wycombe
Attendance: 6,289
Referee: Christophe Berdos (France)

11 April 2010
15:00

Newcastle Falcons (England)	20–55	(Wales) Cardiff Blues
Try: Amesbury 15' c Young 66' c Con: Gopperth (2/2); Pen: Gopperth (2/3) 11', 18'	Report	Try: Laulala 9' c M. Williams 13' c Filise (2) 42' c, 57' c Blair 52'; Roberts 55' c Sweeney 74' c Con: Blair (7/7); Pen: Blair (2/2) 32', 46'

Kingston Park, Newcastle
Attendance: 4,346
Referee: Jérôme Garces (France)

=== Semi-finals ===
30 April 2010
19:45

Connacht (Ireland)	12–19	(France) Toulon
Pen: Keatley (4/4) 2', 21', 37', 44'; Nikora (0/1); Drop: Keatley (0/1)	Report	Try: Kefu 40'+10' c Con: Wilkinson (1/1); Pen: Wilkinson (3/3) 10', 19', 35'; Drop: Wilkinson (1/3) 26'

Galway Sportsgrounds, Galway
Attendance: 7,000
Referee: Wayne Barnes (England)

1 May 2010
18:00

London Wasps (England)	15–18	(Wales) Cardiff Blues
Pen: Walder (5/6) 20', 32', 35', 41', 62'	Report	Try: Halfpenny 27' m Jenkins 59' c Con: Blair (1/2); Pen: Blair (2/5) 38', 52'

Adams Park, High Wycombe
Attendance: 8,413
Referee: Romain Poite (France)

=== Final ===
On 28 April 2010, the competition organiser, European Rugby Cup, announced that the final would be held on 23 May. The time was set at 13:00 UTC (14:00 BST, 15:00 CEST), but the location would depend on the result of the Connacht–Toulon semi-final. Since Toulon won, the final was held at Stade Vélodrome in Marseille.

Cardiff Blues were designated as the home team for the final. However, it was an effective home game for Toulon; Stade Vélodrome hosted two of that club's matches in their domestic season. Cardiff Blues won the final against Toulon by 28–21.

23 May 2010
15:00

Cardiff Blues (Wales)	28–21	(France) Toulon
Try: Roberts 50' c Halfpenny 65' m Davies 69' c Con: Blair (2/3); Pen: Halfpenny (1/2) 6'; Blair (2/2) 22', 60'	Report	Try: Williams 37' c Sourice 77' m Con: Wilkinson (1/1); Pen: Wilkinson (2/3) 12', 32'; May (1/1) 55'

Stade Vélodrome, Marseille
Attendance: 48,990
Referee: Alain Rolland (Ireland)

== See also ==
- 2009–10 Heineken Cup
