= 2013–14 Heineken Cup =

International rugby union competition

Tournament details
- Countries: England; France; Ireland; Italy; Scotland; Wales
- Tournament format(s): Round-robin and Knockout
- Date: 11 October 2013 – 24 May 2014

Tournament statistics
- Teams: 24
- Matches played: 79
- Attendance: 1,127,926 (14,278 per match)
- Tries scored: 308 (3.9 per match)
- Top point scorer(s): Jonny Wilkinson (Toulon) (100 points)
- Top try scorer(s): Chris Ashton (Saracens) (11 tries)

Final
- Venue: Millennium Stadium, Cardiff
- Attendance: 67,578
- Champions: (France) Toulon (2nd title)
- Runners-up: (England) Saracens

The 2013–14 Heineken Cup was the 19th and final season of the Heineken Cup, the annual rugby union European club competition for clubs from the top six nations in European rugby.

The pool stage began on 11 October 2013 and ran through to 17–19 January 2014, followed by the knockout stages culminating in the final. The final was originally to be held in France in May 2014, however the Federation Française de Rugby subsequently announced that they had withdrawn their application to host due to uncertainty over the availability of Stade de France. ERC invited the Heineken Cup participating countries to submit tenders for the right to host the Heineken Cup and Challenge Cup finals and three – England, Scotland and Wales – submitted bids. Cardiff was selected with the Heineken Cup final to be held in the Millennium Stadium on Saturday 24 May 2014 and the Challenge Cup final to be held the previous day in the Cardiff Arms Park.

Toulon – the defending champions – beat Saracens 23–6 in the final.

On 10 April 2014, following nearly two years of negotiations, an agreement for a new European club competition structure was reached. ERC was wound up and replaced by a new Swiss-based organising body known as European Professional Club Rugby. The Heineken Cup was replaced by a new top-tier competition, the European Rugby Champions Cup, which would continue to involve clubs from all of the top six European nations. It initially featured 20 clubs instead of the 24 in the Heineken Cup. The second-tier European Challenge Cup had a minor name change and become the European Rugby Challenge Cup, and continued to involve 20 teams. A new third-tier competition, to be known as the qualifying competition and later the European Rugby Continental Shield, would feature clubs from second-tier European rugby nations, plus Italian clubs that do not play in Pro12, although this eventually foundered.

== Teams ==
The default allocation of teams was as follows:

- England: 6 teams, based on performance in the Aviva Premiership and Anglo–Welsh Cup
- France: 6 teams, based on regular-season finish in the Top 14
- Ireland: 3 teams, based on regular-season finish in Pro12
- Wales: 3 teams, based on regular-season finish in Pro12
- Italy and Scotland: 2 teams each, based on participation in Pro12 (as there are only 2 from each nation)

The remaining two places were filled by the winners of the previous year's Heineken Cup and Amlin Challenge Cup. If the cup winners were already qualified through their domestic league, an additional team from their country would claim a Heineken Cup place (assuming another team was available). Accordingly, since Heineken Cup winners Toulon were already qualified through the Top 14, the extra French berth went to Perpignan. Also, since Amlin Cup winners Leinster were already qualified through the Pro12, the extra Irish berth went to Connacht.

Teams are listed in the order they were presented to Heineken Cup organiser European Rugby Cup by their respective leagues.

England	France	Ireland	Italy	Scotland	Wales
Leicester Tigers; Northampton Saints; Saracens; Harlequins; Gloucester; Exeter Chiefs	Castres; Toulon; Clermont Auvergne; Toulouse; Montpellier; Racing Métro; Perpignan	Leinster; Munster; Ulster; Connacht	Benetton Treviso; Zebre	Glasgow Warriors; Edinburgh	Ospreys; Scarlets; Cardiff Blues

== Seeding ==
The seeding system was the same as in the 2012–13 tournament. The 24 competing teams were ranked based on past Heineken Cup and European Challenge Cup performance, with each pool receiving one team from each quartile, or Tier. The requirement to have only one team per country in each pool, however, still applied (with the exception of the inclusion of the seventh French team, Racing Métro 92).

The brackets show each team's European Rugby Club Ranking at the end of the 2012–13 season.

Tier 1	(Ireland) Leinster (1)	(France) Toulon (2)	(France) Toulouse (3)	(France) Clermont Auvergne (4)	(Ireland) Munster (6)	(Ireland) Ulster (7)
Tier 2	(England) Northampton Saints (9)	(Wales) Cardiff Blues (10)	(England) Harlequins (11)	(England) Saracens (12)	(England) Leicester Tigers (13)	(France) Perpignan (14)
Tier 3	(Scotland) Edinburgh (15)	(Wales) Ospreys (17)	(Wales) Scarlets (18)	(Scotland) Glasgow Warriors (19)	(France) Montpellier (20)	(Ireland) Connacht (21)
Tier 4	(England) Gloucester (23)	(France) Castres (25)	(France) Racing Métro 92 (26)	(England) Exeter Chiefs (28)	(Italy) Benetton Treviso (29)	(Italy) Zebre (35)

== Pool stage ==
The draw for the pool stage took place on 5 June 2013 at the Aviva Stadium in Dublin. The dates and times of the first 4 rounds were announced on 20 July 2013.

Under the rules of the competition organiser, European Rugby Cup, tie–breakers within each pool were as follows.

- Competition points earned in head-to-head matches
- Total tries scored in head-to-head matches
- Point differential in head-to-head matches

ERC had four additional tie-breakers, used if tied teams are in different pools, or if the above steps cannot break a tie between teams in the same pool:

- Tries scored in all pool matches
- Point differential in all pool matches
- Best disciplinary record (fewest players receiving red or yellow cards in all pool matches)
- Coin toss

Key to colours
Winner of each pool, advance to quarter-finals.
Two highest-scoring second-place teams advance to quarter-finals.
Third- through fifth- highest-scoring second-place teams parachute into the knockout stage of the European Challenge Cup.

=== Pool 1 ===
Team	P	W	D	L	PF	PA	Diff	TF	TA	TB	LB	Pts
(Ireland) Leinster (6)	6	5	0	1	152	66	+86	16	7	2	0	22
(England) Northampton Saints (5C)	6	4	0	2	107	104	+3	11	10	0	1	17
(France) Castres Olympique	6	2	0	4	78	104	−26	5	6	0	1	9
(Wales) Ospreys	6	1	0	5	75	138	−63	3	12	0	1	5

=== Pool 2 ===
Team	P	W	D	L	PF	PA	Diff	TF	TA	TB	LB	Pts
(France) Toulon (3)	6	5	0	1	170	104	+66	15	10	3	1	24
(Wales) Cardiff Blues	6	3	0	3	119	148	−29	10	14	1	1	14
(England) Exeter Chiefs	6	2	0	4	118	123	−5	11	14	1	3	12
(Scotland) Glasgow Warriors	6	2	0	4	98	130	−32	12	10	1	2	11

=== Pool 3 ===
Team	P	W	D	L	PF	PA	Diff	TF	TA	TB	LB	Pts
(France) Toulouse (5)	6	5	0	1	143	63	+80	16	4	2	1	23
(England) Saracens (8)	6	4	0	2	217	74	+143	29	5	3	1	20
(Ireland) Connacht	6	3	0	3	101	147	−46	7	20	0	1	13
(Italy) Zebre	6	0	0	6	33	210	−177	2	25	0	0	0

=== Pool 4 ===
Team	P	W	D	L	PF	PA	Diff	TF	TA	TB	LB	Pts
(France) Clermont (2)	6	5	0	1	139	69	+70	17	5	3	1	24
(England) Harlequins (6C)	6	3	0	3	126	103	+23	12	12	1	3	16
(Wales) Scarlets	6	2	1	3	122	150	−28	11	16	0	1	11
(France) Racing Métro 92	6	1	1	4	66	131	−65	5	12	0	1	7

=== Pool 5 ===
Team	P	W	D	L	PF	PA	Diff	TF	TA	TB	LB	Pts
(Ireland) Ulster (1)	6	6	0	0	179	62	+117	17	4	2	0	26
(England) Leicester Tigers (7)	6	4	0	2	159	112	+47	16	9	3	2	21
(France) Montpellier	6	2	0	4	121	124	−3	14	11	2	1	11
(Italy) Benetton Treviso	6	0	0	6	41	202	−161	2	25	0	0	0

=== Pool 6 ===
Team	P	W	D	L	PF	PA	Diff	TF	TA	TB	LB	Pts
(Ireland) Munster (4)	6	5	0	1	161	77	+84	19	6	2	1	23
(England) Gloucester (7C)	6	3	0	3	113	114	−1	13	10	1	1	14
(Scotland) Edinburgh	6	3	0	3	104	141	−37	10	17	0	0	12
(France) Perpignan	6	1	0	5	112	158	−46	10	19	1	2	7

=== Seeding and runners-up ===
- Bare numbers indicate Heineken Cup quarter–final seeding.
- Numbers with "C" indicate Challenge Cup quarter–final seeding.

Seed	Pool winners	Pts	TF	+/−
1	(Ireland) Ulster	26	17	+117
2	(France) Clermont	24	17	+70
3	(France) Toulon	24	15	+66
4	(Ireland) Munster	23	19	+84
5	(France) Toulouse	23	16	+80
6	(Ireland) Leinster	22	16	+86
Seed	Pool runners–up	Pts	TF	+/−
7	(England) Leicester Tigers	21	16	+47
8	(England) Saracens	20	29	+143
5C	(England) Northampton Saints	17	11	+3
6C	(England) Harlequins	16	12	+23
7C	(England) Gloucester	14	13	−1
—	(Wales) Cardiff Blues	14	10	−29

== Knock-out stages ==
All kickoff times are local to the match location.

=== Quarter-finals ===
5 April 2014
13:30

Munster (Ireland)	47–23	(France) Toulouse
Try: Earls 4' c Kilcoyne 41' c Stander 45' c Laulala 63' m Zebo 73' m O'Connell 79' c Con: Keatley (4/6); Pen: Keatley (3/4) 15', 22', 61'	Report	Try: Gear 53' c Tekori 71' c Con: Beauxis (2/2); Pen: McAlister (3/3) 7', 29', 33'

Thomond Park, Limerick
Attendance: 26,200
Referee: Nigel Owens (Wales)

5 April 2014
17:00

Clermont (France)	22–16	(England) Leicester Tigers
Try: Fofana 21' c Con: Parra (1/1); Pen: Parra (5/6) 14', 26', 34', 40', 65'	Report	Try: Crane 36' c Con: Williams (1/1); Pen: Williams (3/4) 43', 51', 60'

Stade Marcel-Michelin, Clermont-Ferrand
Attendance: 17,862
Referee: Alain Rolland (Ireland)

5 April 2014
18:30

Ulster (Ireland)	15–17	(England) Saracens
Pen: Pienaar (3/5) 15', 29', 39'; Jackson (2/3) 69, 72'	Report	Try: Ashton (2) 22' m, 67' c Botha 48' m Con: Farrell (1/3)

Ravenhill Stadium, Belfast
Attendance: 16,853
Referee: Jérôme Garcès (France)

6 April 2014
17:30

Toulon (France)	29–14	(Ireland) Leinster
Try: Chiocci 45' c Mitchell 61' c Con: Giteau (2/2); Pen: Wilkinson (2/2) 3', 16'; Giteau (2/3) 42', 78'; D. Armitage (1/1) 66'	Report	Try: Murphy 69' m Pen: Gopperth (3/4) 19', 28', 54'

Stade Mayol, Toulon
Attendance: 15,252
Referee: Wayne Barnes (England)

=== Semi-finals ===
26 April 2014
15:40

Saracens (England)	46–6	(France) Clermont
Try: Ashton (2) 7' c, 64' m penalty try 12' c Farrell 31' c Wyles 72' c Streather 78' c Con: Goode (5/6); Pen: Goode (1/1) 37'; Bosch (1/1) 53'	Report	Pen: Parra (2/2) 11', 28'

Twickenham Stadium, London
Attendance: 25,942
Referee: Nigel Owens (Wales)

27 April 2014
16:30

Toulon (France)	24–16	(Ireland) Munster
Pen: Wilkinson (6/7) 5', 18', 26', 35', 64', 79'; D. Armitage (1/1) 39'; Drop: Wilkinson (1/2) 30'	Report	Try: Zebo 52' c Con: Keatley (1/1); Pen: Keatley (3/4) 7', 29', 33'

Stade Vélodrome, Marseille
Attendance: 37,043
Referee: Wayne Barnes (England)

=== Final ===
24 May 2014
17:00 BST

Toulon (France)	23–6	(England) Saracens
Try: Giteau 29' c Smith 59' c Con: Wilkinson (2/2); Pen: Wilkinson (2/2) 53', 63'; Drop: Wilkinson (1/1) 37'	Report	Pen: Farrell (2/3) 3', 45'

Millennium Stadium, Cardiff
Attendance: 67,578
Referee: Alain Rolland (Ireland)

== See also ==
- 2013–14 European Challenge Cup
