= 2009–10 Heineken Cup =

International rugby union competition

Tournament details
- Countries: England; France; Ireland; Italy; Scotland; Wales
- Tournament format(s): Round-robin and Knockout
- Date: Oct 2009 – May 2010

Tournament statistics
- Teams: 24
- Matches played: 79
- Attendance: 1,080,598 (13,678 per match)
- Top point scorer(s): (France) Dimitri Yachvili (Biarritz) (113 points)
- Top try scorer(s): (Ireland) Tommy Bowe (Ospreys) (7 tries)

Final
- Venue: Stade de France, Saint-Denis
- Attendance: 78,962
- Champions: (France) Toulouse (4th title)
- Runners-up: (France) Biarritz Olympique

The 2009–10 Heineken Cup was the 15th season of the Heineken Cup, the annual rugby union European club competition for clubs from the top six nations in European rugby. It started in October 2009 and ended on 22 May 2010 with the final at Stade de France in which Toulouse defeated Biarritz 21–19 to win the trophy for the fourth time.

== Teams ==
Seven English teams participated, as an English team, Leicester Tigers, progressed further in the previous year's tournament than any French or Italian team. France had six participants, Ireland three, Wales four, Italy two and Scotland two.

On 29 May 2009, Newport Gwent Dragons defeated Calvisano 42–17 in a play-off to secure the 24th and final qualification place.

England	France	Wales	Ireland	Scotland	Italy
Leicester Tigers; Harlequins; London Irish; Gloucester; Bath; Sale Sharks; Northampton Saints	Perpignan; Toulouse; Clermont; Stade Français; Biarritz; Brive	Ospreys; Cardiff Blues; Scarlets; Newport Gwent Dragons	Leinster; Munster; Ulster	Edinburgh; Glasgow Warriors	Benetton Treviso; Viadana

== Seeding ==
The seeding system was the same as in the 2008–09 tournament. The 24 competing teams are ranked based on past Heineken Cup and European Challenge Cup performance, with each pool receiving one team from each quartile, or Tier. The requirement to have only one team per country in each pool, however, still applied (with the exception of the inclusion of the seventh English team).

The brackets show each team's European Rugby Club Ranking at the start of the 2009–10 season.

Tier 1	(Ireland) Munster (1)	(England) Leicester Tigers (2)	(Ireland) Leinster (3)	(France) Toulouse (4)	(England) Bath (5)	(France) Biarritz (6)
Tier 2	(Wales) Cardiff Blues (8)	(France) Stade Français (9)	(England) Gloucester (10)	(France) Perpignan (11)	(Wales) Ospreys (13)	(England) London Irish (14)
Tier 3	(England) Northampton Saints (15)	(England) Sale Sharks (16)	(France) Clermont (17)	(Wales) Scarlets (18)	(Ireland) Ulster (20)	(Wales) Newport Gwent Dragons (21)
Tier 4	(England) Harlequins (23)	(Scotland) Glasgow Warriors (24)	(Scotland) Edinburgh (26)	(Italy) Benetton Treviso (28)	(France) Brive (29)	(Italy) Viadana (36)

== Pool stage ==
The draw for the pool stage took place on 9 June 2009 in Paris.

Key to colours
Winner of each pool, and best two runners-up, advance to quarterfinals. Seed # in parentheses
Third- through fifth- highest-scoring second-place teams parachute into the knockout stage of the European Challenge Cup. Seed # in brackets

=== Pool 1 ===
Team	P	W	D	L	Tries for	Tries against	Try diff	Points for	Points against	Points diff	TB	LB	Pts
(Ireland) Munster (1)	6	5	0	1	19	10	9	185	94	91	3	1	24
(England) Northampton Saints (8)	6	4	0	2	16	8	8	138	104	34	2	1	19
(France) Perpignan	6	2	0	4	12	10	2	108	123	−15	1	2	11
(Italy) Benetton Treviso	6	1	0	5	7	26	−19	68	178	−110	0	1	5

=== Pool 2 ===
Team	P	W	D	L	Tries for	Tries against	Try diff	Points for	Points against	Points diff	TB	LB	Pts
(France) Biarritz (2)	6	5	0	1	19	8	11	188	97	91	3	0	23
(England) Gloucester [6]	6	4	0	2	12	12	0	119	129	−10	1	0	17
(Scotland) Glasgow Warriors	6	2	0	4	9	14	−5	120	140	−20	0	1	9
(Wales) Newport Gwent Dragons	6	1	0	5	12	18	−6	108	169	−61	0	2	6

=== Pool 3 ===
Team	P	W	D	L	Tries for	Tries against	Try diff	Points for	Points against	Points diff	TB	LB	Pts
(France) Clermont Auvergne (5)	6	4	0	2	24	11	13	201	120	81	3	2	21
(Wales) Ospreys (7)	6	4	1	1	21	11	10	188	121	67	2	0	20
(England) Leicester Tigers	6	3	1	2	23	10	13	187	123	64	3	1	18
(Italy) Viadana	6	0	0	6	6	42	−36	83	295	−212	0	0	0

=== Pool 4 ===
Team	P	W	D	L	Tries for	Tries against	Try diff	Points for	Points against	Points diff	TB	LB	Pts
(France) Stade Français (6)	6	4	0	2	11	7	4	124	95	29	1	1	18
(Ireland) Ulster	6	4	0	2	11	6	5	127	94	33	0	1	17
(Scotland) Edinburgh	6	3	0	3	3	10	−7	64	94	−30	0	1	13
(England) Bath	6	1	0	5	6	8	−2	84	116	−32	0	3	7

=== Pool 5 ===
Team	P	W	D	L	Tries for	Tries against	Try diff	Points for	Points against	Points diff	TB	LB	Pts
(France) Toulouse (3)	6	5	0	1	13	9	4	143	92	51	2	1	23
(Wales) Cardiff Blues [5]	6	4	0	2	14	10	4	149	104	45	1	1	18
(England) Sale Sharks	6	3	0	3	15	16	−1	126	153	−27	1	1	14
(England) Harlequins	6	0	0	6	13	20	−7	102	171	−69	0	2	2

=== Pool 6 ===
Team	P	W	D	L	Tries for	Tries against	Try diff	Points for	Points against	Points diff	TB	LB	Pts
(Ireland) Leinster (4)	6	4	1	1	19	6	13	154	60	94	3	1	22
(Wales) Scarlets [7]	6	4	0	2	12	20	−8	116	147	−31	1	0	17
(England) London Irish	6	3	1	2	16	8	8	140	94	46	2	1	17
(France) Brive	6	0	0	6	7	20	−13	68	177	−109	0	1	1

- Scarlets win the tiebreaker over London Irish by virtue of winning both of the matches between the two teams.

=== Seeding and runners-up ===
- Bare numbers indicate Heineken Cup quarterfinal seeding.
- Numbers with "C" indicate Challenge Cup quarterfinal seeding.

Seed	Pool Winners	Pts	TF	+/−
1	(Ireland) Munster	24	19	+91
2	(France) Biarritz	23	19	+91
3	(France) Toulouse	23	14	+51
4	(Ireland) Leinster	22	19	+94
5	(France) Clermont	21	24	+81
6	(France) Stade Français	18	11	+29
Seed	Pool Runners-up	Pts	TF	+/−
7	(Wales) Ospreys	20	17	+67
8	(England) Northampton	19	16	+34
5C	(Wales) Cardiff Blues	18	14	+45
6C	(England) Gloucester	17	12	−10
7C	(Wales) Scarlets	17	12	−29
–	(Ireland) Ulster	17	11	+33

== Knock-out stage ==
The semi-final draw was conducted on 24 January in Paris. The winner of the topmost quarter-final on each side of the bracket receives home-country advantage in its semi-final. (The competition organisers have traditionally allowed Biarritz to take semi-finals to Spain, as it has stadiums that meet Heineken Cup semi-final hosting requirements that are far closer to Biarritz than any acceptable venue in France. The club also enjoys large support in the Basque Country of Spain, a region with which it shares a cultural affinity.)

All times are local times.

=== Quarter-finals ===
9 April 2010
20:00

Leinster (Ireland)	29–28	(France) Clermont Auvergne
Try: Heaslip (2) 22' c, 33' c Con: Sexton (2/2); Pen: Sexton (5/6) 21', 37', 54', 65', 72'	Report	Try: Malzieu (3) 11' c, 44' m, 62' c Con: James (2/3); Pen: James (3/7) 16', 49', 60'

RDS Arena, Dublin
Attendance: 20,000
Referee: Dave Pearson (England)

10 April 2010
16:00

Biarritz (France)	29–28	(Wales) Ospreys
Try: Ngwenya 11' c Balshaw 50' c Con: Yachvili (2/2); Pen: Yachvili (2/3) 22', 48'; Drop: Traille (3/4) 1', 23', 60'	Report	Try: R. Jones 19' c Byrne 35' m Walker 75' c Con: Biggar (2/3); Pen: Biggar (2/4) 45', 53'; Drop: Biggar (1/4) 40'

Estadio Anoeta, Donostia-San Sebastián
Attendance: 25,000
Referee: George Clancy (Ireland)

10 April 2010
17:30

Munster (Ireland)	33–19	(England) Northampton Saints
Try: Warwick 4' m Howlett (2) 24' m, 75' c de Villiers 52' c Con: O'Gara (2/4) 53', 76'; Pen: O'Gara (3/4) 1', 58', 67'	Report	Try: Clarke 39' c Con: Myler (1/1); Pen: Myler (4/4) 10', 16', 28', 55'

Thomond Park, Limerick
Attendance: 26,000
Referee: Nigel Owens (Wales)

11 April 2010
17:30

Toulouse (France)	42–16	(France) Stade Français
Try: Jauzion 40' c Albacete 58' c Heymans 74' c Con: Skrela (3/3); Pen: Skrela (7/9) 24', 32', 45', 48', 66', 70', 79'	Report	Try: Roncero 20'; Con: Beauxis (1/1); Pen: Beauxis (3/3) 26', 43', 47'

Stadium Municipal, Toulouse
Attendance: 35,089
Referee: Alan Lewis (Ireland)

=== Semi-finals ===
1 May 2010
16:45

Toulouse (France)	26–16	(Ireland) Leinster
Try: Jauzion 55' c Skrela 60' c Con: Skrela (2/2); Pen: Skrela (4/6) 4', 16', 30', 71'; Drop: Élissalde (0/1)	Report	Try: Heaslip 64' c Con: Berne (1/1); Pen: Berne (2/2) 31', 40'+1'; Kearney (1/1) 42'

Stadium Municipal, Toulouse
Attendance: 34,951
Referee: Nigel Owens (Wales)

2 May 2010
16:15

Biarritz Olympique (France)	18–7	(Ireland) Munster
Pen: Yachvili (6/6) 39', 44', 65', 72', 78', 80'	Report	Try: Earls 29' c Con: O'Gara (1/1)

Estadio Anoeta, Donostia-San Sebastián
Attendance: 30,900
Referee: Dave Pearson (England)

=== Final ===
The final was played at the Stade de France in Saint-Denis, Saint-Denis.

22 May 2010
18:00

Biarritz (France)	19–21	(France) Toulouse
Try: Hunt 73' c Con: Courrent (1/1); Pen: Yachvili (4/4) 4', 15', 29', 48'	Report	Pen: Fritz (1/1) 21'; Skrela (3/5) 33', 36', 65'; Drop: Fritz (1/1) 38'; Skrela (2/2) 51', 58'

Stade de France, Saint-Denis
Attendance: 78,962
Referee: Wayne Barnes (England)

== Leading scorers ==
=== Points ===
Rank	Name	Club	Appearances	Points
1	(France) Dimitri Yachvili	(France) Biarritz	7	113
2	(Ireland) Ronan O'Gara	(Ireland) Munster	8	98
3	(Wales) Dan Biggar	(Wales) Ospreys	7	90
4	(Australia) Brock James	(France) Clermont Auvergne	7	76
5	(New Zealand) Ben Blair	(Wales) Cardiff Blues	6	75

=== Tries ===
Rank	Name	Club	Appearances	Tries
1	(Ireland) Tommy Bowe	(Wales) Ospreys	7	7
2	(England) Chris Ashton	(England) Northampton Saints	6	6
2	(New Zealand) Scott Hamilton	(England) Leicester Tigers	6	6
2	(United States) Takudzwa Ngwenya	(France) Biarritz	7	6
5	(France) Julien Malzieu	(France) Clermont Auvergne	6	5
5	(Fiji) Napolioni Nalaga	(France) Clermont Auvergne	5	5

== See also ==
- 2009–10 European Challenge Cup
