= 2011–12 European Challenge Cup =

2011–12 Amlin Challenge Cup

Tournament details
- Countries: England; France; Italy; Romania; Spain; Wales
- Tournament format(s): Round-robin and knockout
- Date: 10 November 2011 to 18 May 2012

Tournament statistics
- Teams: 23
- Matches played: 67
- Attendance: 344,547 (5,142 per match)
- Tries scored: 365 (5.45 per match)
- Top point scorer(s): Jonny Wilkinson (Toulon) (96 points)
- Top try scorer(s): Morgan Turinui (Stade Français) (6 tries)

Final
- Venue: Twickenham Stoop, London
- Attendance: 9,376
- Champions: (France) Biarritz (1st title)
- Runners-up: (France) Toulon

The 2011–12 Amlin Challenge Cup was the 16th season of the European Challenge Cup, Europe's second-tier club rugby union competition. The tournament began with two matches on 10 November 2011 and ended with the final on 18 May 2012 at the Twickenham Stoop in London. A total of 23 teams from six countries participated—20 in the pool stage, plus three teams parachuting into the knockout stages from the Heineken Cup. In an all-French final, Biarritz claimed their first Challenge Cup, defeating Toulon 21–18. The Basque club claimed a place in the 2012–13 Heineken Cup, which will be their 13th consecutive appearance in Europe's top club competition.

The defending Challenge Cup champions, England's Harlequins, did not initially have a chance to defend their crown because they had earned an automatic berth in the Heineken Cup. However, Quins parachuted into the knockout stage of this season's Challenge Cup, losing to Toulon in the quarter-finals. All four semi-finalists were from France, equalling the achievement of 1996–97 and 1998–99.

== Teams ==
Teams that parachuted in from the Heineken Cup are in italics.

England	France	Italy	Romania	Spain	Wales
London Wasps; Sale Sharks; Newcastle Falcons; Worcester Warriors; Exeter Chiefs; Harlequins	Stade Français; Perpignan; Toulon; Brive; Agen; Bayonne; Lyon; Bordeaux; Biarritz	Cavalieri Prato; Crociati Parma; Petrarca Padova; Rovigo	Bucharest Wolves	La Vila	Newport Gwent Dragons; Scarlets

== Seeding ==
Teams that did not qualify for the 2011–12 Heineken Cup were ordered into four tiers according to the European Rugby Club Ranking. Five pools of four teams were drawn comprising one team from each tier.

The brackets show each team's European Rugby Club Ranking at the end of the 2010–11 season.

Tier 1	(France) Stade Français (8)	(France) Perpignan (9)	(England) London Wasps (14)	(France) Toulon (19)	(England) Sale Sharks (22)
Tier 2	(Wales) Newport Gwent Dragons (26)	(France) Brive (27)	(England) Newcastle Falcons (28)	(England) Worcester Warriors (29)	(France) Bayonne
Tier 3	(Italy) Petrarca Padova	(Italy) Crociati Parma	(Italy) Rugby Rovigo	(France) Agen	(England) Exeter Chiefs
Tier 4	(Italy) Cavalieri Prato	(France) Lyon	(France) Bordeaux-Bègles	(Romania) Bucharest Wolves	(Spain) Club Rugby La Vila Comunidad Valencia

== Pool stage ==
Key to colours
Winner of each pool advances to quarterfinals. Seed # in parentheses.

=== Pool 1 ===
Team	P	W	D	L	Tries for	Tries against	Try diff	Points for	Points against	Points diff	TB	LB	Pts
(France) Stade Français (1)	6	6	0	0	33	5	+28	241	43	+198	5	0	29
(England) Worcester Warriors	6	4	0	2	30	9	+21	194	95	+99	4	0	20
(Romania) București Wolves	6	2	0	4	12	27	−15	102	184	−82	2	0	10
(Italy) Crociati Parma	6	0	0	6	4	38	−34	36	251	−215	0	0	0

=== Pool 2 ===
Team	P	W	D	L	Tries for	Tries against	Try diff	Points for	Points against	Points diff	TB	LB	Pts
(France) Toulon (3)	6	5	0	1	26	5	+14	197	73	+124	3	1	25
(England) Newcastle Falcons	6	4	0	2	18	9	+9	133	82	+51	2	0	18
(France) Lyon	6	3	0	3	16	11	+5	143	114	+29	1	1	14
(Italy) Petrarca Padova	6	0	0	6	3	38	−28	50	254	−204	0	0	0

=== Pool 3 ===
Team	P	W	D	L	Tries for	Tries against	Try diff	Points for	Points against	Points diff	TB	LB	Pts
(England) London Wasps (4)	6	5	0	1	21	7	+14	189	75	+114	4	0	24
(France) Bayonne	6	5	0	1	10	3	+7	197	61	+136	2	0	22
(France) Bordeaux Bègles	6	2	0	4	9	14	−5	82	132	−50	1	1	10
(Italy) Rovigo	6	0	0	6	5	21	−16	51	251	−200	0	1	1

=== Pool 4 ===
Team	P	W	D	L	Tries for	Tries against	Try diff	Points for	Points against	Points diff	TB	LB	Pts
(England) Exeter Chiefs (8)	6	5	0	1	22	4	+18	202	64	+121	2	1	23
(France) Perpignan	6	4	0	2	17	9	+8	153	112	+41	2	0	18
(Wales) Newport Gwent Dragons	6	3	0	3	16	7	+9	139	100	+10	2	1	15
(Italy) Cavalieri Prato	6	0	0	6	6	41	−35	62	280	−218	0	0	0

=== Pool 5 ===
Team	P	W	D	L	Tries for	Tries against	Try diff	Points for	Points against	Points diff	TB	LB	Pts
(France) Brive (2)	6	6	0	0	26	7	+19	209	79	+130	3	0	28
(England) Sale Sharks	6	4	0	2	31	8	+23	225	96	+129	4	0	20
(France) Agen	6	2	0	4	24	21	+3	168	166	+2	2	0	10
(Spain) La Vila	6	0	0	6	6	51	−45	64	325	−261	0	0	0

== Knockout stage ==
=== Seeding ===
Following the end of the pool stage, the 5 pool winners were seeded alongside the top 3 2011–12 Heineken Cup pool runners-up who failed to qualify for the Heineken Cup quarter-finals.

(HC) Means a team has entered the competition from the Heineken Cup

Seed	Team
1	(France) Stade Français
2	(France) Brive
3	(France) Toulon
4	(England) London Wasps
5 (HC)	(France) Biarritz
6 (HC)	(England) Harlequins
7 (HC)	(Wales) Scarlets
8	(England) Exeter Chiefs

=== Quarter-finals ===
To be played on the weekend of 5–8 April 2012.

5 April 2012
20:45 CEST

Stade Français (France)	22–17	(England) Exeter Chiefs
Try: Camara 43' m Williams 79' m Pen: Dupuy (4/4) 29', 40', 47', 55'	Report	Try: Naqelevuki 68' m Pen: Mieres (4/5) 21', 27', 36', 49'

Stade Charléty, Paris
Attendance: 4,693
Referee: Peter Fitzgibbon (Ireland)

6 April 2012
20:45 CEST

Toulon (France)	37–8	(England) Harlequins
Try: Tillous-Borde 34' c Lapeyre 60' c Armitage 73' m Con: Wilkinson (1/1); Giteau (1/2); Pen: Wilkinson (5/5) 5', 8', 14', 18' 30'; Giteau (1/1) 52'	Report	Try: Care 70' m Pen: Clegg (1/1) 11'

Stade Mayol, Toulon
Attendance: 12,762
Referee: George Clancy (Ireland)

7 April 2012
12:30 BST

London Wasps (England)	23–26	(France) Biarritz
Try: Wade 63' c Davis 66' c Con: Robinson (2/2); Pen: Robinson (3/3) 12', 21', 39'	Report	Try: Balshaw 22' c van Staden 40' c Con: Yachvili (2/2); Pen: Yachvili (4/4) 28', 54', 61', 75'

Adams Park, High Wycombe
Attendance: 4,308
Referee: John Lacey (Ireland)

8 April 2012
20:45 CEST

Brive (France)	15–11	(Wales) Scarlets
Pen: Swanepoel (5/8) 15', 36', 46', 50', 79'	Report	Try: Li. Williams 58' m Pen: S. Jones (2/4) 30', 39'

Stade Amédée-Domenech, Brive-la-Gaillarde
Attendance: 7,850
Referee: Wayne Barnes (England)

=== Semi-finals ===
This is the fifth time that one country has supplied all four semi-finalists: they were all French in 1996–97 and 1998–99, and all English in the 2005–06 and 2007–08 seasons.

27 April 2012
20:55 CEST

Toulon (France)	32–29	(France) Stade Français
Try: Armitage 2' m Pen: Wilkinson (7/11) 31', 40', 42', 50', 55', 63', 67'; Drop: Wilkinson (2/3) 46', 79'	Report	Try: Bonneval 12' c Turinui 60' c Con: Plisson (2/2); Pen: Plisson (3/5) 15', 26', 37'; Drop: Plisson (2/2) 21', 68'

Stade Mayol, Toulon
Attendance: 12,404
Referee: Alain Rolland (Ireland)

28 April 2012
16:00 CEST

Biarritz (France)	19–0	(France) Brive
Try: Traille 29' c Con: Yachvili (1/1); Pen: Yachvili (4/5) 17', 23', 67', 71'	Report

Parc des Sports Aguiléra, Biarritz
Attendance: 8,927
Referee: George Clancy (Ireland)

=== Final ===
18 May 2012
20:00 BST

Biarritz (France)	21–18	(France) Toulon
Pen: Yachvili (7/7) 4', 17', 24', 35', 46', 53', 73'	Report	Pen: Wilkinson (5/7) 11', 22', 31', 44', 59'; Drop: Wilkinson (1/1) 65'

Twickenham Stoop, London
Attendance: 9,376
Referee: Wayne Barnes (England)
