= European Rugby Club Rankings =

The European Rugby Club Rankings were a system introduced for the 2008–09 European rugby season to rank clubs based on their performance in the now-defunct Heineken Cup and the European Challenge Cup over the previous four seasons. These rankings were used to aid in the seeding process for the Heineken Cup and the European Challenge Cup, defining the first four tiers for the Heineken Cup, with the cup holder automatically placed in the top tier.

Starting with the 2009–10 season, the rankings could determine one entrant in the following season's Heineken Cup. If England or France produced winners of both European cups in a season, a Heineken Cup berth was awarded to the highest-ranked team from another nation not already qualified, as England and France were capped at seven Heineken Cup places each. Scotland’s two professional teams, automatically entered in the Heineken Cup, were also subject to this rule if they won either cup.

The European Rugby Club Rankings system was discontinued after the 2013–14 season when the Heineken Cup was replaced by the Investec Champions Cup and the European Challenge Cup continued under the governance of European Professional Club Rugby (EPCR). The current seeding and qualification for the Investec Champions Cup and EPCR Challenge Cup rely on domestic league standings and performance in the Challenge Cup, with no equivalent ranking system in place.

== Historical Rankings (2008–2013) ==
The European Rugby Club Rankings were calculated based on points earned in the Heineken Cup and European Challenge Cup over the previous four seasons. Below is the final ranking as published for the 2013–14 season, reflecting performances from 2009–10 to 2012–13. Note that these rankings are no longer in use but are preserved for historical reference.

Per ERC rules, ties between clubs were broken as follows:

1. Points earned in the most recent participation in the Heineken Cup, counting back season-by-season until the teams were separated.
2. Points earned in the most recent season, counting back season-by-season until the teams were separated.

For example, Harlequins and Cardiff Blues were tied on 15 points in the 2012–13 season. Harlequins earned 5 points (reached the quarter-final) in the 2012–13 Heineken Cup, while Cardiff earned 2 points (finished 3rd in their pool), so Harlequins were ranked higher. Similarly, Edinburgh and London Wasps were tied on 11 points. Edinburgh earned 1 point in the 2012–13 Heineken Cup (4th in their pool), while Wasps earned 2 points in the 2012–13 European Challenge Cup (quarter-finals), but Edinburgh ranked higher due to Heineken Cup participation.

Key to colours
Denotes teams that competed in the 2013–14 Heineken Cup
Denotes teams that competed in the 2013–14 Amlin Challenge Cup

Rank	Team	Total Points	2013–14 Points	2012–13 Points	2011–12 Points	2010–11 Points	2009–10 Points
1	(France) Stade Toulousain	88	5	6	11	11	7
2	(Ireland) Leinster	54	11	11	5	5	5
3	(England) Northampton Saints	32	7	9	7	4	5
4	(France) La Rochelle	31	5	3	5	7	11
5	(Ireland) Munster	29	7	6	5	4	7
6	(England) Harlequins	25	5	5	8	4	3
7	(England) Bath	24	0	4	6	5	9
8	(England) Exeter Chiefs	24	6	3	2	9	4
9	(England) Saracens	21	8	7	5	1	0
10	(France) Union Bordeaux Bègles	21	2	5	4	5	5
11	(England) Leicester Tigers	19	4	5	3	6	1
12	(England) Bristol Bears	18	3	2	4	3	6
13	(Scotland) Glasgow Warriors	17	4	5	2	4	2
14	(France) RC Toulon	15	4	2	2	3	4
15	(Italy) Benetton	14	1	4	0	7	2
16	(Scotland) Edinburgh	13	2	1	7	1	2
17	(England) Gloucester	12	5	2	2	2	1
18	(Wales) Ospreys	11	1	2	2	2	4
19	(Wales) Scarlets	11	2	7	3	2	3
20	(England) Wasps	10	3	2	2	5	3
21	(Northern Ireland) Ulster	9	1	1	3	2	2
22	(France) Racing 92	9	2	4	1	2	0
23	(Ireland) Connacht	9	2	2	1	0	4
24	(France) Brive (Note: Brive won the 2012–13 Rugby Pro D2 promotion playoff final, thereby earning promotion to the 2013–14 Top 14 and a place in that season's Challenge Cup.)	9	2	–	4	2	1
25	(France) Clermont	7	2	2	1	2	0
26	(France) Montpellier	6	1	2	1	2	0
27	(England) London Irish	5	0	0	2	1	2
28	(England) Exeter Chiefs	6	2	2	2	0	–
29	(Italy) Benetton	5	1	1	1	1	1
30	(England) Sale Sharks	5	2	1	0	0	2
31	(Wales) Newport Gwent Dragons	2	0	0	0	1	1
32	(England) Newcastle Falcons (Note: As 2012–13 RFU Championship champions, Newcastle Falcons have been promoted to the Aviva Premiership for 2013–14 and they will compete in the 2013–14 Challenge Cup.)	2	0	–	0	0	2
33	(France) La Rochelle	2	–	–	–	2	–
34	(France) Bourgoin	2	–	–	–	0	2
35	(Italy) Zebre (Note: Zebre took the place of Aironi in both Pro12 and the Heineken Cup, following the latter side's demise at the end of the 2011–12 season. Zebre did not inherit Aironi's European ranking.)	2	1	1	–	–	–
36	(Italy) Viadana	1	0	–	–	–	1
37	(France) Bayonne (Note: Bayonne and București have equivalent records over the past four seasons, but this is the order given on the official web site.)	0	0	0	0	0	0
38	(Romania) București Wolves	0	0	0	0	0	0
39	(Italy) Prato	0	0	0	0	0	–
40	(England) Worcester Warriors	0	0	0	0	–	0
41	(France) Bordeaux-Bègles	0	0	0	0	–	–
42	(Italy) Mogliano (Note: Calvisano, Grenoble and Mogliano have equivalent records over the past four seasons, but this is the order given on the official web site.)	0	0	0	–	–	–
43	(Italy) Calvisano	0	0	0	–	–	–
44	(France) Grenoble	0	0	0	–	–	–
45	(Spain) Olympus Madrid (Note: Olympus Rugby XV were forced to withdraw from the 2013–14 European Challenge Cup due to financial problems. They were replaced with Lusitanos XV.)	0	–	–	–	–	0
46	(France) Oyonnax (Note: As 2012–13 Rugby Pro D2 champions, Oyonnax have been automatically promoted to the Top 14 for 2013–14. As new Top 14 members, they will compete in the 2013–14 Challenge Cup.)	0	0	–	–	–	–
47	(England) Saracens	0	0	–	–	–	–

Note that a ranking was not necessary for a club to participate in European competition. For example, among the 20 clubs in the 2011–12 European Challenge Cup, only nine had a ranking at the start of that season. To be ranked, a club must have, in the previous four seasons, either (1) participated in the Heineken Cup or (2) advanced from the pool stage of the Challenge Cup.

== Points Criteria (Historical) ==
The following criteria were used to calculate points for the European Rugby Club Rankings from 2008–09 to 2013–14. These are no longer in use but are included for historical reference.

Heineken Cup

Place	Points	Total Points
Winner	+2	10/11
Finalist	+2	8/9
Semi-finalist	+2	6/7
Quarter-finalist	+1	4/5
Pool winner	4	
Pool runner-up	3	
Pool 3rd place	2	
Pool 4th place	1	

Pool winners earned the higher of the two figures given for the knockout stages, while pool runners-up received the lower figure.

European Challenge Cup

Place	ECC Team Points	Total	Heineken Cup Team Points	Total
Winner	+1	6	+1	6
Finalist	+1	5	+1	5
Semi-finalist	+2	4	+1	4
Quarter-finalist	2	2	0^{*}	3

^{*}Heineken Cup teams will have picked up 3 points by finishing runner-up in their Heineken Cup pool

== Current Structure (2024–25 Season) ==
The Investec Champions Cup and EPCR Challenge Cup, organized by EPCR, are the current premier club rugby competitions in Europe. The Investec Champions Cup, which succeeded the Heineken Cup in 2014–15, is the top-tier competition, while the EPCR Challenge Cup is the second-tier competition. For the 2024–25 season, 24 clubs compete in the Champions Cup, with eight teams each from the Premiership, Top 14, and United Rugby Championship (URC). The final qualification spot is awarded to the winner of the previous season’s Challenge Cup, which for 2024–25 was the Sharks, displacing the eighth-placed URC team, Ospreys.

Teams are drawn into four pools of six, with each team playing four matches against teams from other leagues (two home, two away). The top four teams from each pool advance to the knockout stage, with the top two per pool earning home advantage in the round of 16. The fifth-placed teams drop into the Challenge Cup knockout rounds, while the sixth-placed teams are eliminated. Points are awarded as follows: 4 for a win, 2 for a draw, 1 bonus point for scoring four or more tries, and 1 bonus point for losing by seven points or fewer. In the 2024–25 season, no Welsh teams qualified for the Champions Cup, a first since the competition’s inception in 1995.

The 2024–25 Champions Cup final was won by Union Bordeaux Bègles, who defeated Northampton Saints 28–20 on 24 May 2025 at the Millennium Stadium in Cardiff, marking their first title. Winger Damian Penaud was named the best player of the tournament, setting a record with 14 tries. Defending champions Stade Toulousain and three-time finalists Leinster were eliminated in the semi-finals by Bordeaux Bègles and Northampton Saints, respectively.

The EPCR Challenge Cup follows a similar format, with 18 teams in three pools of six, playing four matches each. The top four teams per pool advance to the knockout stage, joined by the four fifth-placed teams from the Champions Cup. The 2024–25 Challenge Cup final was refereed by Hollie Davidson, the first female referee to officiate an EPCR final, overseeing the match between Bath and Lyon.
