= Philip Fitzgerald =

Scottish rugby union player

- Born: Philip Fitzgerald; 11 March 1977 (age 49) Stirling, Scotland
- Height: 1.84 m (6 ft 0 in)
- Weight: 100 kg (15 st 10 lb)

Rugby union career
Amateur team(s)
Years	Team	Apps	(Points)
1995-97	Watsonians RFC		
Senior career
Years	Team	Apps	(Points)
1997	Manly RUFC		
1997-98	RC Toulonnais		
1998-99	Boroughmuir RFC		
1999-10	RC Toulonnais		
International career
Years	Team	Apps	(Points)
2008	Scotland A		

Philip Fitzgerald (known as Fitzy) is a Scottish rugby union player, born 11 March 1977 in Stirling (Scotland), who played as a hooker for RC Toulonnais (1.84 m, 100 kg).

== Career ==
- 1995–1997 : Watsonians (Edinburgh) (Scotland)
- Summer 1997 : Manly (Sydney) (Australia)
- 1997–1998 : RC Toulon (France)
- 1998–1999 : Boroughmuir (Edinburgh) (Scotland)
- 1999-2010 : RC Toulon (France)

== Honours ==
=== Club ===
- Pro D2 Champions : 2005, 2008
  - Finalist : 2001
- Champion de France Reichel : 1998
- Winner of the challenge des Provinces Reichel : 1998

=== National team ===
- Scotland A – 2008
- Scotland Universities- Universities World Cup in 2000
- Scotland U19- 1996
- FIRA Scotland Juniors in 1996
- Scotland Schoolboys from 1993 to 1995

=== Personal ===
- Member of the Scottish team of the year for 2007 at hooker
