= 2013–14 European Challenge Cup =

Rugby union tournament

2013–14 Amlin Challenge Cup

Tournament details
- Countries: England; France; Italy; Portugal; Romania; Wales
- Tournament format(s): Round-robin and knockout
- Date: 10 October 2013 – 23 May 2014

Tournament statistics
- Teams: 23
- Matches played: 67
- Attendance: 321,736 (4,802 per match)
- Tries scored: 383 (5.72 per match)
- Top point scorer(s): Jérôme Porical (Stade Français) (83 points)
- Top try scorer(s): William Helu (London Wasps) (7 tries)

Final
- Venue: Cardiff Arms Park
- Attendance: 12,483
- Champions: (England) Northampton Saints (2nd title)
- Runners-up: (England) Bath

The 2013–14 Amlin Challenge Cup was the 18th and final season of the European Challenge Cup, Europe's second-tier club rugby union competition. A total of 23 teams participated: 20 in the pool stage, plus three teams parachuting into the knockout stages from the Heineken Cup. The original 20 teams represented six countries.

The pool stage began on 10 October 2013 and ran until 19 January 2014, followed by the knockout stages. The final was originally to be held in France in May 2014, however the Federation Française de Rugby subsequently announced that they had withdrawn their application to host due to uncertainty over the availability of Stade de France. ERC invited the Heineken Cup participating countries to submit tenders for the right to host the Heineken Cup and Challenge Cup finals and three – England, Scotland and Wales – submitted bids. Cardiff was selected with the Heineken Cup final to be held in the Millennium Stadium on Saturday, 24 May 2014 and the Challenge Cup final to be held the previous day in the Cardiff Arms Park.

The defending Challenge Cup champions, Ireland's Leinster, did not defend their crown because they earned an automatic berth in the Heineken Cup, and qualified for the knockout stages of the Heineken Cup. In an all-English final, Northampton Saints defeated Bath 30–16 at the Cardiff Arms Park, to win the tournament for the second time.

On 10 April 2014, following nearly two years of negotiations, an agreement for a new European club competition structure was reached. ERC would be wound up and replaced by a new Switzerland-based organising body known as European Professional Club Rugby. The European Challenge Cup underwent a minor name change to become the European Rugby Challenge Cup, remaining as a 20-team competition, though two of these teams will come from a new competition, featuring teams from nations who do not compete in the Six Nations. The Heineken Cup would be replaced by a new top-tier competition, the European Rugby Champions Cup, which would continue to involve clubs from all of the top six European nations, but featuring 20 clubs instead of the 24 in the Heineken Cup. The new third-tier competition, to be known as the qualifying competition, would feature clubs from second-tier European rugby nations, plus Italian clubs that do not play in the Pro12.

== Teams ==
The qualifying teams were

- England: 6 teams from the Aviva Premiership that did not qualify for the Heineken Cup
- France: 7 teams from the Top 14 that did not qualify for the Heineken Cup
- Wales: 1 team from the Pro12 that did not qualify for the Heineken Cup
- Italy: the 4 teams that finished in the top four places in the National Championship of Excellence
- Portugal: one team formed to play in the Challenge Cup. ERC awarded the spot to Portugal after Olympus Rugby XV withdrew from the competition
- Romania: one team that is formed every season to play in the Challenge Cup, consisting of rugby players playing in the domestic Romanian leagues

| England | France | Italy | Portugal | Romania | Wales |
|---|---|---|---|---|---|
| Bath; London Wasps; London Irish; Sale Sharks; Worcester Warriors; Newcastle Falcons (Note: As 2012–13 RFU Championship winners, Newcastle Falcons have been promoted to the Aviva Premiership for 2013–14 and they will compete in the Challenge Cup.) | Biarritz Olympique; Bayonne; Stade Français; Grenoble; Bordeaux-Bègles; Oyonnax (Note: As 2013 Rugby Pro D2 champions, Oyonnax have been automatically promoted to the Top 14 for 2013–14. As new Top 14 members, they will compete in the Challenge Cup.); Brive (Note: Brive won the 2013 Rugby Pro D2 promotion playoff final, thereby earning promotion to the 2013–14 Top 14 and a place in the Challenge Cup.) | Viadana; Calvisano; Cavalieri Prato; Mogliano | Lusitanos XV | București Wolves | Newport Gwent Dragons |

== Seeding ==
Teams that did not qualify for the 2013–14 Heineken Cup were ordered into four tiers according to the European Rugby Club Ranking. (Note: Calvisano, Grenoble and Mogliano have equivalent ranking and appear to have been allocated to tiers in alphabetic order.) Five pools of four teams were drawn comprising one team from each tier.

The brackets show each team's European Rugby Club Ranking at the end of the 2013–14 season.

| Tier 1 | (France) Biarritz Olympique (5) | (France) Stade Français (8) | (England) London Wasps (16) | (England) Bath (22) | (France) Brive (24) |
| Tier 2 | (England) London Irish (27) | (England) Sale Sharks (30) | (Wales) Newport Gwent Dragons (31) | (England) Newcastle Falcons (32) | (Italy) Viadana (36) |
| Tier 3 | (France) Bayonne (37) | (Italy) Cavalieri Prato (39) | (England) Worcester Warriors (40) | (France) Bordeaux-Bègles (41) | (Italy) Calvisano (43) |
| Tier 4 | (France) Grenoble (44) | (Italy) Mogliano (42) | (France) Oyonnax (46) | (Romania) București Wolves (38) | (Portugal) Lusitanos XV |

== Pool stage ==
The draw for the pool stage took place on 5 June 2013 at the Aviva Stadium in Dublin. The dates and times of the first 4 rounds were announced on 27 July 2013. Lusitanos XV replaced Olympus Madrid on 2 September 2013.

Key to colours
| Winner of each pool advances to quarterfinals. Seed # in parentheses. |

Points breakdown:

4 points for a win
2 points for a draw
1 bonus point for scoring four or more tries in a match (TB)
1 bonus point for a loss by seven points or less (LB)

Source: www.ercrugby.com

=== Pool 1 ===
| Team | P | W | D | L | PF | PA | Diff | TF | TA | TB | LB | Pts |
|---|---|---|---|---|---|---|---|---|---|---|---|---|
| (England) Sale Sharks (4) | 6 | 5 | 0 | 1 | 155 | 65 | +90 | 18 | 7 | 2 | 1 | 23 |
| (France) Biarritz Olympique | 6 | 3 | 0 | 3 | 119 | 116 | +3 | 16 | 12 | 2 | 2 | 16 |
| (France) Oyonnax | 6 | 2 | 1 | 3 | 86 | 142 | −56 | 9 | 17 | 1 | 1 | 12 |
| (England) Worcester Warriors | 6 | 1 | 1 | 4 | 87 | 124 | −37 | 9 | 16 | 0 | 1 | 7 |

=== Pool 2 ===
| Team | P | W | D | L | PF | PA | Diff | TF | TA | TB | LB | Pts |
|---|---|---|---|---|---|---|---|---|---|---|---|---|
| (England) Bath (1) | 6 | 6 | 0 | 0 | 243 | 50 | +193 | 34 | 4 | 4 | 0 | 28 |
| (Wales) Newport Gwent Dragons | 6 | 3 | 0 | 3 | 150 | 132 | +18 | 17 | 13 | 2 | 0 | 14 |
| (France) Bordeaux-Bègles | 6 | 3 | 0 | 3 | 171 | 149 | +22 | 21 | 17 | 2 | 0 | 14 |
| (Italy) Mogliano | 6 | 0 | 0 | 6 | 55 | 288 | −233 | 5 | 43 | 0 | 0 | 0 |

=== Pool 3 ===
| Team | P | W | D | L | PF | PA | Diff | TF | TA | TB | LB | Pts |
|---|---|---|---|---|---|---|---|---|---|---|---|---|
| (France) Brive (8) | 6 | 5 | 1 | 0 | 121 | 74 | +47 | 11 | 6 | 1 | 0 | 23 |
| (England) Newcastle Falcons | 6 | 4 | 0 | 2 | 126 | 69 | +57 | 15 | 5 | 1 | 2 | 19 |
| (Romania) București Wolves | 6 | 2 | 0 | 4 | 94 | 105 | −11 | 6 | 7 | 0 | 2 | 10 |
| (Italy) Calvisano | 6 | 0 | 1 | 5 | 80 | 173 | −93 | 6 | 20 | 0 | 0 | 2 |

=== Pool 4 ===
| Team | P | W | D | L | PF | PA | Diff | TF | TA | TB | LB | Pts |
|---|---|---|---|---|---|---|---|---|---|---|---|---|
| (England) London Wasps (2) | 6 | 6 | 0 | 0 | 285 | 76 | +209 | 38 | 10 | 3 | 0 | 27 |
| (France) Bayonne | 6 | 3 | 0 | 3 | 219 | 118 | +101 | 28 | 14 | 3 | 0 | 15 |
| (France) Grenoble | 6 | 2 | 1 | 3 | 118 | 158 | −40 | 17 | 18 | 2 | 0 | 12 |
| (Italy) Viadana | 6 | 0 | 1 | 5 | 86 | 356 | −270 | 13 | 54 | 0 | 0 | 2 |

=== Pool 5 ===
| Team | P | W | D | L | PF | PA | Diff | TF | TA | TB | LB | Pts |
|---|---|---|---|---|---|---|---|---|---|---|---|---|
| (France) Stade Français (3) | 6 | 5 | 0 | 1 | 202 | 75 | +127 | 27 | 6 | 4 | 0 | 24 |
| (England) London Irish | 6 | 5 | 0 | 1 | 293 | 65 | +228 | 41 | 6 | 4 | 0 | 24 |
| (Italy) Cavalieri Prato | 6 | 2 | 0 | 4 | 100 | 198 | −98 | 12 | 28 | 2 | 1 | 11 |
| (Portugal) Lusitanos XV | 6 | 0 | 0 | 6 | 68 | 325 | −257 | 8 | 48 | 0 | 0 | 0 |

=== Seeding for knockout stage ===
Following the end of the pool stage, the five pool winners will be seeded alongside the three 2013–14 Heineken Cup pool runners-up who failed to qualify for the Heineken Cup quarter-finals – designated (HC). Teams are ranked by total number of competition points earned (4 for a win, 2 for a draw, etc.) in the pool stage. If this does not separate the teams, qualification/ranking is based on:

(a) the number of tries scored in all pool matches;
(b) aggregate points difference from all pool matches;
(c) the club with the fewest players sent off and/or suspended in all pool matches;
(d) toss of a coin.

Seeding as it stands

| Seed | Team | Pts | TF | +/− |
|---|---|---|---|---|
| 1 | (England) Bath | 28 | 34 | +193 |
| 2 | (England) London Wasps | 27 | 38 | +209 |
| 3 | (France) Stade Français | 24 | 27 | +127 |
| 4 | (England) Sale Sharks | 23 | 18 | +90 |
| 5 (HC) | (England) Northampton Saints | 17 | 11 | +3 |
| 6 (HC) | (England) Harlequins | 16 | 12 | +23 |
| 7 (HC) | (England) Gloucester | 14 | 13 | −1 |
| 8 | (France) Brive | 23 | 11 | +47 |

Quarter-final pairings

- Seed 1 (ACC 1) v Seed 8 (ACC 5)
- Seed 2 (ACC 2) v Seed 7 (Heineken Cup 3)
- Seed 3 (ACC 3) v Seed 6 (Heineken Cup 2)
- Seed 4 (ACC 4) v Seed 5 (Heineken Cup 1)

A draw determined the semi-finals pairings.

== Knockout stage ==
All kickoff times are local to the match location.

=== Quarter-finals ===
3 April 2014
20:00

| Sale Sharks (England) | 14–28 | (England) Northampton Saints |
| Try: Thomas 5' c Fihaki 73' c Con: Macleod (1/1); Ford (1/1) | Report | Try: Nutley (2) 17' c, 37' c Dickinson 29' c Foden 33' c Con: Hooley (4/4) |

AJ Bell Stadium, Salford
Attendance: 4,650
Referee: Romain Poite (France)

4 April 2014
21:00

| Stade Français (France) | 6–29 | (England) Harlequins |
| Pen: Steyn (2/4) 18', 31' | Report | Try: Brown 45' c Molenaar 76' c Con: Evans (1/1); Botica (1/1); Pen: Evans (4/4) 15', 22', 40', 56'; Drop: Evans (1/1) 73' |

Stade Jean-Bouin, Paris
Attendance: 10,200
Referee: Leighton Hodges (Wales)

6 April 2014
14:00

| Bath (England) | 39–7 | (France) Brive |
| Try: Agulla (3) 9' m, 35' m, 49' c Abendanon 28' c Rokoduguni 32' m Young 42' c Con: Ford (3/6); Pen: Ford (1/2) 20' | Report | Try: Murphy 65' c Con: Laranjeira (1/1) |

Recreation Ground, Bath
Attendance: 9,331
Referee: John Lacey (Ireland)

6 April 2014
19:00

| London Wasps (England) | 36–24 | (England) Gloucester |
| Try: Mullan 30' c Festuccia 43' c Helu 76' c Con: Goode (3/3); Pen: Goode (4/6) 36', 51', 65', 71'; Drop: Goode (1/2) 13' | Report | Try: May 55' c Evans 61' c M. Thomas 80' c Con: Cook (3/3); Pen: Cook (1/2) 33' |

Adams Park, High Wycombe
Attendance: 5,311
Referee: Marius Mitrea (Italy)

=== Semi-finals ===
25 April 2014
20:00

| Northampton Saints (England) | 18–10 | (England) Harlequins |
| Try: Collins 26' m Fotuali'i 44' c Con: Myler (1/2); Pen: Myler (2/2) 20', 35' | Report | Try: Easter 63' c Con: Botica (1/1); Pen: Botica (1/3) 39' |

Franklin's Gardens, Northampton
Attendance: 10,077
Referee: George Clancy (Ireland)

27 April 2014
13:00

| London Wasps (England) | 18–24 | (England) Bath |
| Try: Helu 39' c Johnson 64' m Con: Goode (1/2); Pen: Goode (2/2) 2', 14' | Report | Try: Perenise 24' c Webber (2) 46' c, 57' c Con: Ford (3/3); Pen: Ford (1/2) 11' |

Adams Park, High Wycombe
Attendance: 6,010
Referee: Romain Poite (France)

=== Final ===
23 May 2014
20:00

| Bath (England) | 16–30 | (England) Northampton Saints |
| Try: Watson 26' c Con: Ford (1/1); Pen: Ford (3/6) 1', 13', 65' | Report | Try: Dowson 70' c Foden 75' m Con: Myler (1/2); Pen: Myler (6/6) 6', 23', 47', 56', 59', 63' |

Cardiff Arms Park, Cardiff
Attendance: 12,483
Referee: Jérôme Garcès (France)

== See also ==
- 2013–14 Heineken Cup
