= Olivier Missoup =

French rugby union player

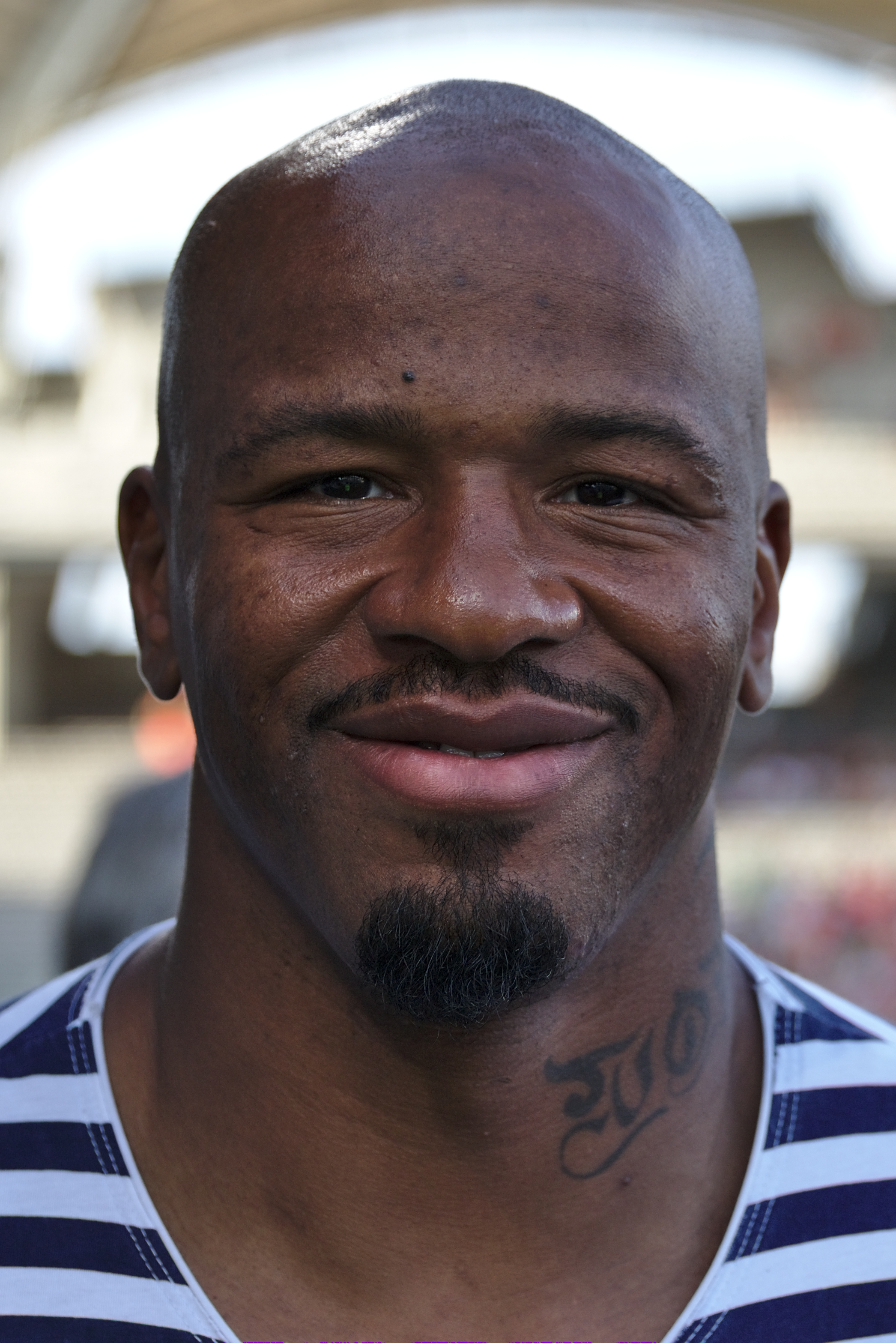
Missoup in 2015

Olivier Missoup is a French rugby union player, born 5 February 1981 in Neuilly-sur-Seine (Hauts-de-Seine), who plays as a flanker for US Oyonnax (1.93 m, 95 kg).

== Career ==
- Racing Métro 92
- Stade Français Paris
- 2005–2006 : Stade aurillacois
- 2006–2008 : US Oyonnax
- 2008–2012 : RC Toulon
- 2012–2014 : Stade Français Paris
- 2014- : US Oyonnax
