= Thomas Sourice =

French rugby union player

Thomas Sourice, born 10 February 1984 in Tours (Indre-et-Loire), is a French rugby union player who plays as flanker for RC Toulonnais (1.83 m, 94 kg).

== Career ==
- 1997-2000 : Nice UR, student at Pôle Espoir Rugby of the school at Parc Impérial à Nice
- Since 2000 : RC Toulon

== Honours ==
- Pro D2 Champions : 2008
- Championnat de France Espoirs Semi-finalists : 2006
- Championnat de France Reichel Finalists : 2005
