= 2012–13 Heineken Cup =

European Rugby club competition season

Tournament details
- Countries: England; France; Ireland; Italy; Scotland; Wales
- Tournament format(s): Round-robin and Knockout
- Date: 12 October 2012 – 18 May 2013

Tournament statistics
- Teams: 24
- Matches played: 79
- Attendance: 1,063,218 (13,458 per match)
- Tries scored: 293 (3.71 per match)
- Top point scorer(s): Morgan Parra (Clermont) (113 points)
- Top try scorer(s): Napolioni Nalaga (Clermont) (8 tries)

Final
- Venue: Aviva Stadium, Dublin
- Attendance: 50,148
- Champions: (France) Toulon (1st title)
- Runners-up: (France) Clermont

The 2012–13 Heineken Cup was the 18th season of the Heineken Cup, the annual rugby union European club competition for clubs from the top six nations in European rugby. The tournament began with two pool matches on 12 October 2012 and ended with the final at the Aviva Stadium in Dublin on 18 May 2013.

Leinster, who became one of only two clubs ever to win two consecutive Heineken Cups in 2012, attempted to become the first club ever to win the competition three straight years. However, they were eliminated at the pool stages, the first defending champions to do so since London Wasps in 2007–08. Toulon won an all-French final 16–15 against Clermont.

== Teams ==
The default allocation of teams is as follows:

- England: 6 teams, based on performance in the Aviva Premiership and Anglo–Welsh Cup
- France: 6 teams, based on regular-season finish in the Top 14
- Ireland: 3 teams, based on regular-season finish in Pro12
- Wales: 3 teams, based on regular-season finish in Pro12
- Italy and Scotland: 2 teams each, based on participation in Pro12 (as there are only 2 from each nation)

The remaining two places are filled by the winners of the previous year's Heineken Cup and Amlin Challenge Cup. If the cup winners are already qualified through their domestic league, an additional team from their country will claim a Heineken Cup place (assuming another team is available). Accordingly, Biarritz claimed the Challenge Cup winner's berth, and since Heineken Cup winners Leinster were already qualified through Pro12, the extra Irish berth went to Connacht.

Teams are listed in the order they are presented to Heineken Cup organiser European Rugby Cup by their respective leagues. In the cases of England and France, this does not necessarily match the teams' placement in their national leagues in the preceding season.

England	France	Ireland	Wales	Italy	Scotland
Harlequins; Leicester Tigers; Saracens; Northampton Saints; Exeter Chiefs; Sale Sharks	Toulouse; Toulon; Clermont Auvergne; Castres; Biarritz; Montpellier; Racing Métro	Leinster; Munster; Ulster; Connacht	Ospreys; Scarlets; Cardiff Blues	Benetton Treviso; Zebre	Glasgow Warriors; Edinburgh

== Seeding ==
The seeding system was the same as in the 2011–12 tournament. The 24 competing teams are ranked based on past Heineken Cup and European Challenge Cup performance, with each pool receiving one team from each quartile, or Tier. The requirement to have only one team per country in each pool, however, still applies (with the exception of the inclusion of the seventh French team).

The brackets show each team's European Rugby Club Ranking at the end of the 2011–12 season.

Tier 1	(Ireland) Leinster (1)	(France) Toulouse (2)	(France) Biarritz (3)	(Ireland) Munster (4)	(Wales) Cardiff Blues (5)	(England) Northampton (6)
Tier 2	(France) Clermont Auvergne (7)	(Ireland) Ulster (8)	(England) Leicester Tigers (9)	(England) Harlequins (11)	(France) Toulon (12)	(Scotland) Edinburgh (13)
Tier 3	(Wales) Ospreys (14)	(Wales) Scarlets (18)	(Scotland) Glasgow (19)	(England) Saracens (20)	(Ireland) Connacht (24)	(England) Sale Sharks (25)
Tier 4	(Italy) Benetton Treviso (27)	(France) Castres (28)	(France) Racing Métro (29)	(France) Montpellier (30)	(England) Exeter Chiefs (34)	(Italy) Zebre (NR)

== Pool stage ==
The draw for the pool stage took place on 12 June 2012 at the Aviva Stadium.

Under the rules of the competition organiser, European Rugby Cup, tie–breakers within each pool are as follows.

- Competition points earned in head–to–head matches
- Total tries scored in head–to–head matches
- Point differential in head–to–head matches

ERC has four additional tie–breakers, used if tied teams are in different pools, or if the above steps cannot break a tie between teams in the same pool:

- Tries scored in all pool matches
- Point differential in all pool matches
- Best disciplinary record (fewest players receiving red or yellow cards in all pool matches)
- Coin toss

Key to colours
Pool winners, and the two best pool runners–up, advance to quarter–finals.
Third–, fourth– and fifth–highest scoring second–place teams parachute into the knock–out stage of the 2012–13 European Challenge Cup.

=== Pool 1 ===
Team	P	W	D	L	PF	PA	Diff	TF	TA	TB	LB	Pts
(England) Saracens [4]	6	5	0	1	180	76	+104	15	6	2	1	23
(Ireland) Munster [8]	6	4	0	2	133	73	+60	14	4	2	2	20
(France) Racing Métro	6	3	0	3	103	125	−22	7	11	0	0	12
(Scotland) Edinburgh	6	0	0	6	36	178	−142	3	18	0	0	0

=== Pool 2 ===
Team	P	W	D	L	PF	PA	Diff	TF	TA	TB	LB	Pts
(England) Leicester Tigers [6]	6	4	1	1	119	103	+16	13	9	2	0	20
(France) Toulouse	6	4	0	2	132	84	+48	15	4	2	1	19
(Wales) Ospreys	6	2	1	3	120	124	−4	11	15	1	1	12
(Italy) Benetton Treviso	6	1	0	5	107	167	−60	9	20	0	1	5

=== Pool 3 ===
Team	P	W	D	L	PF	PA	Diff	TF	TA	TB	LB	Pts
(England) Harlequins [1]	6	6	0	0	243	71	+172	28	6	4	0	28
(France) Biarritz	6	3	0	3	123	101	+22	14	7	2	1	15
(Ireland) Connacht	6	3	0	3	96	138	−42	5	13	0	0	12
(Italy) Zebre	6	0	0	6	72	224	−152	6	27	0	1	1

=== Pool 4 ===
Team	P	W	D	L	PF	PA	Diff	TF	TA	TB	LB	Pts
(Ireland) Ulster [5]	6	5	0	1	126	55	+71	12	5	2	1	23
(England) Northampton Saints	6	3	0	3	94	109	−15	9	11	1	2	15
(France) Castres	6	3	0	3	77	98	−21	6	6	0	2	14
(Scotland) Glasgow Warriors	6	1	0	5	70	105	−35	7	12	0	2	6

=== Pool 5 ===
Team	P	W	D	L	PF	PA	Diff	TF	TA	TB	LB	Pts
(France) Clermont [2]	6	6	0	0	213	64	+149	23	3	4	0	28
(Ireland) Leinster	6	4	0	2	124	96	+28	12	5	2	2	20
(England) Exeter Chiefs	6	2	0	4	93	166	−73	6	19	0	1	9
(Wales) Scarlets	6	0	0	6	79	183	−104	6	20	0	2	2

=== Pool 6 ===
Team	P	W	D	L	PF	PA	Diff	TF	TA	TB	LB	Pts
(France) Toulon [3]	6	5	0	1	186	84	+102	23	8	3	0	23
(France) Montpellier [7]	6	5	0	1	168	109	+59	17	9	2	0	22
(Wales) Cardiff Blues	6	1	0	5	143	184	−41	12	20	1	1	6
(England) Sale Sharks	6	1	0	5	78	198	−120	7	22	0	0	4

=== Seeding and runners–up ===
- Bare numbers indicate Heineken Cup quarter–final seeding.
- Numbers with "C" indicate Challenge Cup quarter–final seeding.

Seed	Pool Winners	Pts	TF	+/−
1	(England) Harlequins	28	28	+172
2	(France) Clermont	28	23	+149
3	(France) Toulon	23	23	+102
4	(England) Saracens	23	15	+104
5	(Ireland) Ulster	23	12	+71
6	(England) Leicester Tigers	20	13	+16
Seed	Pool Runners–up	Pts	TF	+/−
7	(France) Montpellier	22	17	+59
8	(Ireland) Munster	20	14	+60
5C	(Ireland) Leinster	20	12	+28
6C	(France) Toulouse	19	15	+48
7C	(France) Biarritz	15	14	+22
–	(England) Northampton Saints	15	9	−15

== Knock–out stages ==
All kick–off times are local to the match location.

=== Quarter–finals ===
6 April 2013
16:40

Clermont (France)	36–14	(France) Montpellier
Try: Fofana 27' m Rougerie 32' c Sivivatu 52' c Byrne 66' c Nalaga 75' c Con: Parra (2/3); Skrela (2/2); Pen: Parra (1/2) 20'	Report	Try: Nagusa 80' m Pen: Paillaugue (3/4) 5', 12', 23'

Stade Marcel-Michelin, Clermont-Ferrand
Attendance: 17,726
Referee: Wayne Barnes (RFU)

6 April 2013
18:30

Saracens (England)	27–16	(Ireland) Ulster
Try: Fraser 32' c Ashton 62' m Con: Farrell (1/2); Pen: Farrell (5/5) 1', 28', 36', 49', 59'	Report	Try: Henderson 78' c Con: Pienaar (1/1); Pen: Pienaar (3/5) 26', 30', 56'

Twickenham, London
Attendance: 37,888
Referee: Romain Poite (FFR)

7 April 2013
14:00

Harlequins (England)	12–18	(Ireland) Munster
Pen: Evans (4/5) 3', 18', 28', 65'	Report	Pen: O'Gara (6/8) 24', 33', 42', 46', 48', 56'

The Stoop, London
Attendance: 15,000
Referee: Jérôme Garcès (FFR)

7 April 2013
17:30

Toulon (France)	21–15	(England) Leicester Tigers
Pen: Wilkinson (6/6) 29', 34', 43', 46', 59', 64'; Drop: Wilkinson (1/2) 79'	Report	Pen: Flood (5/6) 10', 14', 18', 57', 65'

Stade Mayol, Toulon
Attendance: 15,263
Referee: George Clancy (IRFU)

=== Semi–finals ===
27 April 2013
18:00

Clermont (France)	16–10	(Ireland) Munster
Try: Nalaga 8' c Con: Parra (1/1); Pen: Parra (3/4) 13', 17', 47'	Report	Try: Hurley 59' c Con: O'Gara (1/1); Pen: O'Gara (1/1) 5'

Stade de la Mosson, Montpellier
Attendance: 31,259
Referee: Nigel Owens (WRU)

28 April 2013
15:00

Saracens (England)	12–24	(France) Toulon
Pen: Farrell (4/5) 2', 21', 34', 49'	Report	Pen: Wilkinson (7/7) 4', 12', 17', 24', 46', 55', 76'; Drop: Wilkinson (1/2) 73'

Twickenham, London
Attendance: 25,584
Referee: Alain Rolland (IRFU)

=== Final ===
18 May 2013
17:00 IST

Clermont (France)	15–16	(France) Toulon
Try: Nalaga 41' m James 47' c Con: Parra (1/2); Pen: Parra (1/1) 3'	Report	Try: D. Armitage 63' c Con: Wilkinson (1/1); Pen: Wilkinson (3/3) 13', 45', 60'

Aviva Stadium, Dublin
Attendance: 50,148
Referee: Alain Rolland (IRFU)

== See also ==
- 2012–13 European Challenge Cup
