= Ben Blair =

NZ international rugby union player

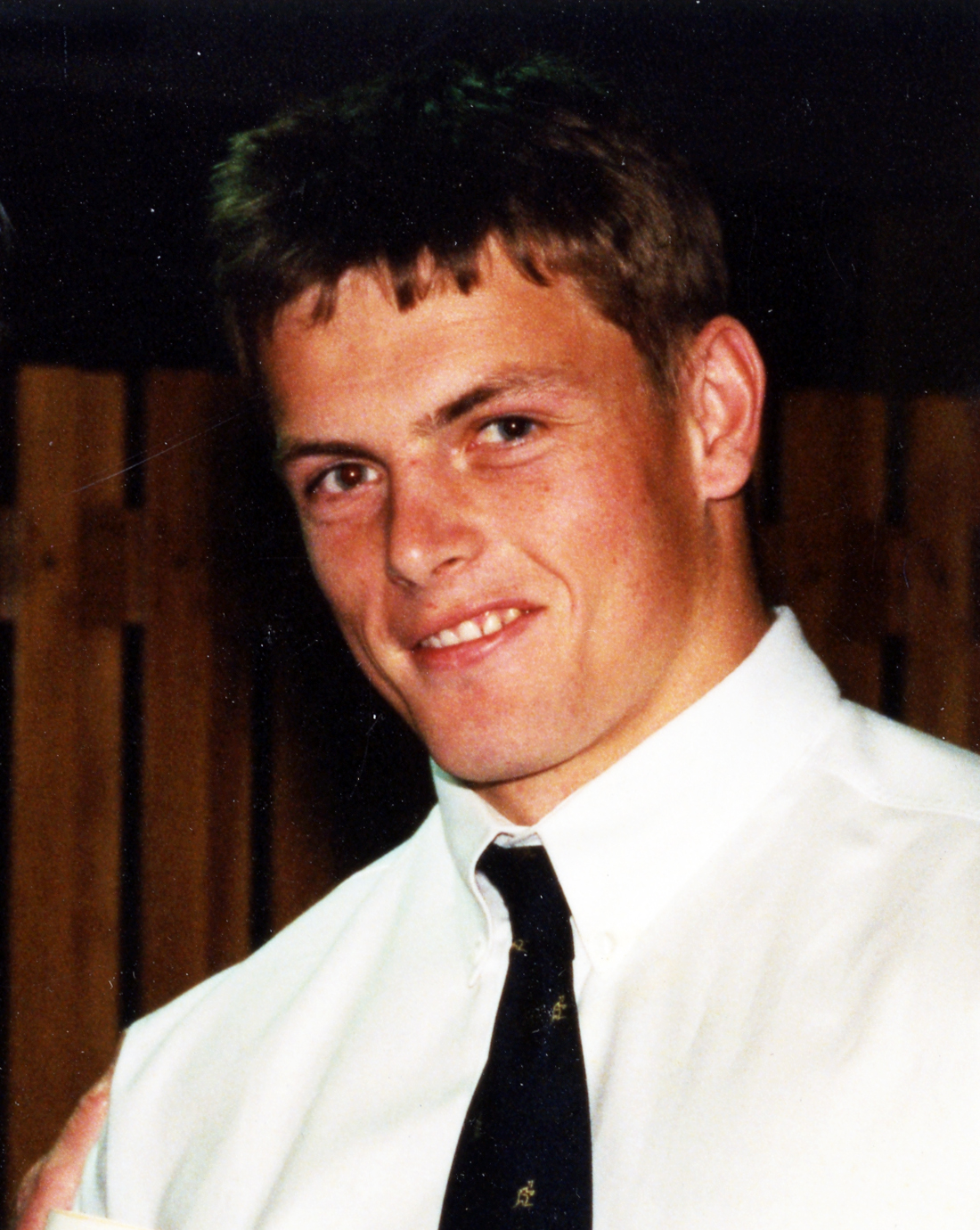
- Blair in 1999
- Full name: Ben Austin Blair
- Born: 26 March 1979 (age 47) Westport, New Zealand
- Height: 174 cm (5 ft 9 in)
- Weight: 83 kg (183 lb; 13 st 1 lb)
- School: St Andrew's College

Rugby union career
- Positions: Fullback; wing
Senior career
Years	Team	Apps	(Points)
1999–2006	Canterbury	78	(950)
2001–2004	Crusaders	28	(159)
2005–2006	Highlanders	23	(214)
2006–2012	Cardiff Blues	115	(1,073)
- Correct as of 28 May 2020
International career
Years	Team	Apps	(Points)
1999–2000	New Zealand U21	9	(107)
2000	New Zealand A	4	(48)
2001–2002	New Zealand	6	(62)
2002	New Zealand Barbarians	1	(22)
2009	Barbarian F.C.	3	(17)
- Correct as of 28 May 2020

Ben Austin Blair (born 26 March 1979 in Westport, New Zealand) is a former rugby union footballer. He played four tests for New Zealand. He scored 37 points on his All Blacks debut against Ireland A in 2001 at Ravenhill in Belfast; however, as this was not a test match he was not capped. His first test match appearance came in November that year against Scotland.

Blair made his Canterbury debut in 1999 and his Crusaders debut in 2001. He won the Super 12 with the Crusaders in 2002, as well as the NPC and the Ranfurly Shield with Canterbury. He also scored an NPC First Division record of 37 points for Canterbury, against Counties Manukau in only his fourth NPC game.

In 2006, he moved to the Highlanders, before moving to the Cardiff Blues, with whom he played between 2007 and 2012. During his time in Cardiff he scored 1078 points, making him the all-time top points scorer for the team. He scored two tries for Cardiff Blues, in the EDF Energy Cup final against Gloucester at Twickenham in April 2009.

In 2012, Blair joined French club SU Agen Lot-et-Garonne of the Top 14; however, he was forced to retire due to a knee injury without playing a single game for the side.
