= RC Toulon =

French rugby union club

- Full name: Rugby Club Toulonnais
- Nickname(s): Le RCT; Les Rouge et Noir (The Red and Blacks)
- Founded: 3 June 1908; 118 years ago
- Location: Toulon, France
- Ground: Stade Mayol (Capacity: 17,500)
- Chairman: Bernard Lemaître
- Coach: Pierre Mignoni
- Captain(s): Charles Ollivon; Baptiste Serin
- Top scorer: Jonny Wilkinson (1,884)
- League: Top 14
- 2024–25: 3rd
| 1st kit | 2nd kit |

Official website
- rctoulon.com

Rugby Club Toulonnais (French pronunciation: [ʁyɡbi klœb tulɔnɛ]), also referred to as Rugby Club Toulon or simply Toulon, is a French professional rugby union club based in Toulon and competing in the Top 14. Located on the French Riviera, in the Provence region, the club plays its home games at the 17,500-capacity Stade Mayol.

Founded in 1908, Toulon is one of the most important and widely supported rugby clubs in France. Domestically, the club has won a total of four league titles, two Pro D2 titles and two Challenge Yves du Manoir. In international competitions, Toulon is the only one to have won the Heineken Cup/European Rugby Champions Cup three times in a row, and succeeded in winning the league/European cup double in 2014 too. Toulon has also won the EPCR Challenge Cup in 2023 after reaching the final on four occasions. The club established itself as a major force in domestic and European rugby in the 2010s when Jonny Wilkinson, Mathieu Bastareaud, Bakkies Botha, Matt Giteau and other rugby stars played at Mayol under Bernard Laporte's management.

A club renowned for its fans fervour and its stadium atmosphere, Toulon has rivalries with Toulouse and Clermont and has traditionally worn a red and black home kit since its inception. The club's crest features a sprig of lily of the valley, symbol of the club's benefactor and Belle Époque singer Félix Mayol who used to wear one on his jacket. A few times per season, important home matches against major teams are played at the 67,394-capacity Stade Vélodrome located in Marseille 50 kilometres (31 mi) away.

== History ==
Rugby Club Toulonnais was founded on 3 June 1908 as a merger of Étoile Sportive Varoise and members of the Stade Varois, a club based in nearby La Seyne-sur-Mer. It took the club 23 years to reach the top of French rugby, when they won the 1931 championship against Lyon Olympique Universitaire (6–3, 2 tries to 1). The players were greeted by 30,000 people when they returned from Bordeaux, where the final had been held.

Toulon remained one of the top French clubs, but they lost four finals scattered over 35 years (1948, 1968, 1971 and 1985). The 1985 extra-time defeat by Stade Toulousain left them with many regrets, and playing a spectacular final (36–22) did nothing to alleviate the pain of losing. The Red and Black waited only two more years to finally lay their hands on the Bouclier de Brennus, as they defeated Racing at the Parc des Princes. The third title came in 1992, against Biarritz Olympique, in Serge Blanco's last match and his last chance to win the title.

For eight years, Toulon were not particularly successful and were in heavy financial trouble (a 10 million franc deficit) forced the Ligue Nationale de Rugby to demote them to the Second Division in July 2000. The club missed an immediate return the next year, going down in the final to Montauban, as only one club was promoted that year. It took them five more years to do so as Toulon went on to win the Pro D2 title. But despite immense popular support (gates averaged more than 12,000), and much enthusiasm, they managed to win only three games out of 26 and were relegated after only a season.

=== Toulon signs star players ===
A new president, Mourad Boudjellal, a Toulonnais who made his fortune in the comic strip business, promised to build a huge team. He said: "I invented the Top 15, with a team that could be competitive in the Top 14". He signed a high number of first-class players, some of them well above 30, like Jean-Jacques Crenca, Yann Delaigue, Gonzalo Quesada and Dan Luger. He created buzz around the team as he managed to sign former All Blacks captain Tana Umaga, who arrived in Toulon right after the end of the Air New Zealand Cup on 26 October 2006. The contract was rumoured to be around €300,000 (£200,000), which Boudjellal claimed to pay from his own pocket, for only eight to ten matches. In a 2010 interview, Boudjellal would say about his decision to pursue Umaga, "It was incredible, because we were in the second division and I was speaking with the best player in the world. But he said yes and came to play with Toulon."

Boudjellal continued to sign high-profile veteran players, including Australia captain and former all-time international caps leader George Gregan, reportedly paid €400,000 out of Boudjellal's pocket, All Blacks' former all-time scoring leader Andrew Mehrtens, and Jonny Wilkinson.

Back in Pro D2 for the 2006–07 season, Toulon finish fourth in the league, putting them in the promotion playoffs for a place in the Top 14, but they lost in the promotion semi-finals 21–17 at La Rochelle. The following season Toulon headed the table from early on, never dropping from the top spot on their way to clinching promotion with two rounds to spare. The 2008–09 season proved to be one of consolidation. Umaga had been handed the coaching reins, but as Boudjellal would later say, "The first season in the Top 14 was very difficult and I learned that Tana Umaga was not yet ready to give up playing – and that he's not a manager." The team managed to survive that season, using a late-season surge to avoid a relegation scare. Toulon had a much more successful 2009–10 campaign, with Wilkinson leading the charge. He would be named the top fly-half of the year in France by leading rugby publication Midi Olympique, and would also be recalled to the England national team. Domestically, Toulon finished second on the league table, losing out to Perpignan for the top spot on a tiebreaker. This finish gave them a spot in the 2010–11 Heineken Cup, and also a first-round bye in that season's Top 14 playoffs. Toulon's domestic campaign ended in the semi-finals with a 35–29 extra-time loss to eventual champion Clermont in Saint-Étienne.

Toulon's 2009–10 Challenge Cup campaign proved more successful. They finished top of their pool and advanced to the knockout stage, crushing Scarlets 38–12 in the quarterfinals and surviving a hard-fought match against Connacht 19–12. Toulon got their preferred final venue of the Vélodrome on 23 May, where they lost to the Cardiff Blues 28–21, missing out on silverware for the season.

In May 2013 Toulon won the 2013 Heineken Cup Final by 16–15 against Clermont Auvergne.

== Emblem ==
On the day of his arrival in Paris, on 1 May 1895, just before his first concert, Félix Mayol was met by a female friend at the station, who gave him some lily-of-the-valley, a flower people traditionally exchange on 1 May in France. He pinned it on his lapel, his concert was a success and Mayol, who was superstitious, made the lily-of-the-valley his personal emblem. It was taken up by the rugby club in 1921.

== Stadium ==
In 1920, its stadium was inaugurated. It is named after Félix Mayol, a very popular concert hall singer from Toulon who had succeeded in Paris in the early 20th century. Shortly after World War I, he purchased what would be the stadium site and donated it to the club. It is one of the few French stadiums to be almost completely surrounded by the city and overlooks the Toulon bay and military harbour in the Mediterranean.

== Charity cross-code matches ==
The club has played in cross-code charity matches with a half each of rugby union and football. On 18 July 2013 they played Olympique de Marseille in the first ever match of the kind at the Stade Mayol to benefit a local charity with Marc Lièvremont and Eric Cantona as the referees in either half, with Olympique de Marseille winning 36–35.

Two years later, the club played another such match to benefit a local children's charity at the Stade Mayol against France 98, the charity association team composed of France's 1998 FIFA World Cup winners, and won 33–26. Bernard Laporte served as one of the referees.

== Honours ==
- Heineken Cup / European Rugby Champions Cup
  - Champions (3): 2013, 2014, 2015
- European Rugby Challenge Cup
  - Champions (1): 2023
  - Runners-up (4): 2010, 2012, 2020, 2022
- French championship Top 14
  - Champions (4): 1931, 1987, 1992, 2014
  - Runners-up (9): 1948, 1968, 1971, 1985, 1989, 2012, 2013, 2016, 2017
- Challenge Yves du Manoir
  - Champions (2): 1934, 1970
  - Runners-up (3): 1939, 1954, 1983
- Pro D2
  - Champions (2): 2005, 2008
  - Runners-up (1): 2001

== Finals results ==
=== Heineken Cup and European Rugby Champions Cup ===
| Date | Winners | Score | Runners-up | Venue | Spectators |
|---|---|---|---|---|---|
| 18 May 2013 | (France) RC Toulon | 16–15 | (France) ASM Clermont | Aviva Stadium, Dublin | 50,148 |
| 24 May 2014 | (France) RC Toulon | 23–6 | (England) Saracens | Millennium Stadium, Cardiff | 67,578 |
| 2 May 2015 | (France) RC Toulon | 24–18 | (France) ASM Clermont | Twickenham, London | 56,662 |

=== European Rugby Challenge Cup ===
| Date | Winners | Score | Runners-up | Venue | Spectators |
|---|---|---|---|---|---|
| 23 May 2010 | (Wales) Cardiff Blues | 28–21 | (France) RC Toulon | Stade Vélodrome, Marseille | 48,990 |
| 18 May 2012 | (France) Biarritz Olympique | 21–18 | (France) RC Toulon | The Stoop, London | 9,376 |
| 16 October 2020 | (England) Bristol Bears | 32–19 | (France) RC Toulon | Stade Maurice David, Aix-en-Provence | 1,000 |
| 27 May 2022 | (France) Lyon OU | 30-12 | (France) RC Toulon | Stade Orange Vélodrome, Marseille | 51,431 |
| 19 May 2023 | (France) RC Toulon | 43-19 | (Scotland) Glasgow Warriors | Aviva Stadium, Dublin | 31,514 |

=== French championship ===
| Date | Winners | Score | Runners-up | Venue | Spectators |
|---|---|---|---|---|---|
| 10 May 1931 | RC Toulon | 6–3 | Lyon OU | Parc Lescure, Bordeaux | 10,000 |
| 18 April 1948 | FC Lourdes | 11–3 | RC Toulon | Stade des Ponts Jumeaux, Toulouse | 29,753 |
| 16 June 1968 | FC Lourdes | 9–9 (aet) | RC Toulon | Stadium Municipal, Toulouse | 28,526 |
| 16 May 1971 | AS Béziers | 15–9 (aet) | RC Toulon | Parc Lescure, Bordeaux | 27,737 |
| 25 May 1985 | Stade Toulousain | 36–22 (aet) | RC Toulon | Parc des Princes, Paris | 37,000 |
| 22 May 1987 | RC Toulon | 15–12 | Racing Club | Parc des Princes, Paris | 48,000 |
| 27 May 1989 | Stade Toulousain | 18–12 | RC Toulon | Parc des Princes, Paris | 48,000 |
| 6 June 1992 | RC Toulon | 19–14 | Biarritz Olympique | Parc des Princes, Paris | 48,000 |
| 9 June 2012 | Stade Toulousain | 18–12 | RC Toulon | Stade de France, Saint-Denis | 79,614 |
| 1 June 2013 | Castres Olympique | 19–14 | RC Toulon | Stade de France, Saint-Denis | 80,033 |
| 31 May 2014 | RC Toulon | 18–10 | Castres Olympique | Stade de France, Saint-Denis | 80,174 |
| 24 June 2016 | Racing 92 | 29–21 | RC Toulon | Camp Nou, Barcelona | 99,124 |
| 4 June 2017 | ASM Clermont | 22–16 | RC Toulon | Stade de France, Saint-Denis | 79,771 |

=== Challenge Yves du Manoir ===
| Date | Winners | Score | Runners-up | Venue | Spectators |
|---|---|---|---|---|---|
| 18 March 1934 | Stade Toulousain; RC Toulon | 0–0 | (tied, joint winners) | Stade des Iris, Villeurbanne | |
| 11 December 1939 | Section Paloise | 5–0 | RC Toulon | Parc Lescure, Bordeaux | 12,000 |
| 30 May 1954 | FC Lourdes | 28–12 | RC Toulon | Stade Mayol, Toulon | |
| 23 May 1970 | RC Toulon | 25–22 | SU Agen | Stade Yves-du-Manoir, Colombes | |
| 4 June 1983 | SU Agen | 29–7 | RC Toulon | Parc des Princes, Paris | 5,083 |

== Current standings ==
2025–26 Top 14 Table
| Pos | Team | Pld | W | D | L | PF | PA | PD | TF | TA | TB | LB | Pts | Qualification |
|---|---|---|---|---|---|---|---|---|---|---|---|---|---|---|
| 1 | Toulouse | 26 | 18 | 0 | 8 | 981 | 617 | +364 | 134 | 73 | 13 | 3 | 86 (Note: Toulouse received a two-point deduction due to irregularities around the transfer of their former player Melvyn Jaminet) | Qualification for playoff semi-finals and European Rugby Champions Cup |
| 2 | Montpellier | 26 | 17 | 1 | 8 | 824 | 587 | +237 | 101 | 69 | 8 | 4 | 82 | Qualification for playoff semi-finals and European Rugby Champions Cup |
| 3 | Stade Français | 26 | 15 | 1 | 10 | 869 | 664 | +205 | 113 | 83 | 11 | 6 | 79 | Qualification for playoff semi-final qualifiers and European Rugby Champions Cup |
| 4 | Pau | 26 | 17 | 0 | 9 | 817 | 665 | +152 | 98 | 82 | 7 | 3 | 78 | Qualification for playoff semi-final qualifiers and European Rugby Champions Cup |
| 5 | Racing 92 | 26 | 16 | 1 | 9 | 828 | 723 | +105 | 101 | 91 | 6 | 2 | 74 | Qualification for playoff semi-final qualifiers and European Rugby Champions Cup |
| 6 | La Rochelle | 26 | 15 | 0 | 11 | 824 | 634 | +190 | 106 | 73 | 8 | 4 | 72 | Qualification for playoff semi-final qualifiers and European Rugby Champions Cup |
| 7 | Clermont | 26 | 15 | 0 | 11 | 812 | 708 | +104 | 103 | 87 | 8 | 3 | 71 | Qualification for European Rugby Champions Cup |
| 8 | Bordeaux Bègles | 26 | 14 | 0 | 12 | 822 | 719 | +103 | 113 | 90 | 8 | 6 | 70 | Qualification for European Rugby Champions Cup |
| 9 | Toulon | 26 | 12 | 1 | 13 | 714 | 820 | −106 | 96 | 103 | 8 | 1 | 59 | Qualification for European Rugby Challenge Cup |
| 10 | Castres | 26 | 11 | 0 | 15 | 660 | 751 | −91 | 81 | 96 | 3 | 8 | 55 | Qualification for European Rugby Challenge Cup |
| 11 | Lyon | 26 | 11 | 1 | 14 | 734 | 774 | −40 | 92 | 101 | 3 | 3 | 52 | Qualification for European Rugby Challenge Cup |
| 12 | Bayonne | 26 | 11 | 0 | 15 | 747 | 869 | −122 | 94 | 113 | 4 | 3 | 51 | Qualification for European Rugby Challenge Cup |
| 13 | Perpignan | 26 | 6 | 0 | 20 | 550 | 797 | −247 | 64 | 99 | 1 | 4 | 29 | Qualification for relegation play-off |
| 14 | Montauban | 26 | 1 | 1 | 24 | 495 | 1349 | −854 | 61 | 197 | 0 | 1 | 7 | Relegation to Pro D2 |

Updated to match(es) played on 17 May 2026. Source: Top 14

== Current squad ==
The Toulon squad for the 2026–27 season is:

RC Toulon 2026–27 Top 14 squad
| **Props**: (France) Leo Ametlla; (Georgia (country)) **Beka Gigashvili**; (France) **Jean-Baptiste Gros**; (France) Samuel Jean-Christophe; (France) **Dany Priso**; (England) **Kyle Sinckler**; (France) **Rabah Slimani**; (France) Owen Sorhaindo; **Hookers**: (France) **Teddy Baubigny**; (France) Pierre Damond; (Italy) **Gianmarco Lucchesi**; **Locks**: (Argentina) Luciano Asevedo; (France) **Matthias Halagahu**; (England) Junior Kpoku; (France) Corentin Mézou; (France) **Swan Rebbadj**; (England) **David Ribbans** | **Back row**: (France) **Esteban Abadie**; (France) **Judicaël Cancoriet**; (England) **Lewis Ludlam**; (England) **Zach Mercer**; (France) **Charles Ollivon**; (France) Joe Quere-Karaba; (Georgia (country)) **Mikheili Shioshvili**; (France) Patrick Tuifua; **Scrum-halves**: (France) **Baptiste Serin**; (Scotland) **Ben White**; **Fly-halves**: (Argentina) **Tomás Albornoz**; (France) Mateo Garcia; (France) Luka Keletaona | **Centres**: (Argentina) **Ignacio Brex**; (France) **Gaël Fickou**; (France) **Antoine Frisch**; (Scotland) **Huw Jones**; (France) Jérémy Sinzelle; (France) Mathieu Smaïli; **Wings**: (France) Oliver Cowie; (France) **Gaël Dréan**; (Fiji) Apete Narogo; (France) Rayan Rebbadj; (Fiji) **Seta Tuicuvu**; (France) **Gabin Villière**; **Fullbacks**: (France) Marius Domon; (France) Mathis Ferté; (France) **Melvyn Jaminet** |
**(c)** denotes the team captain. **Bold** denotes internationally capped players. Source:

RC Toulon 2026–27 Top 14 squad
| **Props**: (France) Anto-Natale Ghipponi; (France) Arthur Maza; (France) Samuel Renault; **Hookers**: (France) Thomas Ametlla; (France) Lohann Gil; (France) Mathias Mazzoni; **Locks**: (Georgia (country)) Davit Barmania; (France) Konrad Faupala; (Spain) Antonio Gamez; (France) Enzo Jean; (Spain) Christian Mendes; (France) Heamani Suta | **Back row**: (France) Diego Gradoz; (France) Tana Keletaona; (France) Noam Moreau; (France) Noe Soko; **Scrum-halves**: (France) Gianni Calleya; **Fly-halves**: (France) Lucas Bonneau; (France) Antoine Dulleu; (France) Lucas Gue; (France) Lorenzo Sirignano; (England) Caylen Umaga | **Centres**: (France) Andrea Azzolin; (France) Kyllian Beal; (Netherlands) Noud Robertson; (France) Leandre Trumeau; **Wings**: (France) Mateo Gracieux; (France) Noe Lebrun; (France) Ewan Tanguy |
**(c)** denotes the team captain. **Bold** denotes internationally capped players. Source:

== Notable former players ==
This is a list of former players in alphabetical order showing nationality and the period played for the club.

=== French ===
- Marc Andreu (2002–2009)
- Mathieu Bastareaud (2011–2019)
- Benjamin Bastères (2001–2011, 2022–2023)
- Jean Berti
- Christian Califano (1990–1991)
- Christian Carrère
- Éric Champ (1979–1996)
- Jean-Jacques Crenca (2006–2007)
- Yann Delaigue (1988–1997, 2006–2007)
- Christophe Dominici (1993–1997)
- Jérôme Gallion (1975–1989)
- André Herrero
- Aubin Hueber (1991–2000, 2003–2006)
- Jean-Teiva Jacquelain "Academy" (2015–2017)
- Benjamin Lapeyre (2010–2013)
- Jo Maso (1962–1964)
- Eric Melville
- Jacques Merquey
- Pierre Mignoni (1996–2000, 2009–2011)
- Olivier Missoup (2008–2012)
- Marc de Rougemont (1991–1998)
- Jean-Baptiste Rué (2006–2007)
- Thomas Sourice (2000–2012)
- Jean-François Tordo

=== International ===
- (Argentina) Felipe Contepomi
- (Argentina) Matias Cortese
- (Argentina) Juan Martín Fernández Lobbe
- (Argentina) Juan Martín Hernández
- (Argentina) Facundo Isa
- (Argentina) Esteban Lozada
- (Argentina) Gonzalo Quesada
- (Argentina) Nicolás Sánchez
- (Argentina) Leonardo Senatore
- (Australia) Fotu Auelua
- (Australia) Quade Cooper
- (Australia) Rocky Elsom
- (Australia) Matt Giteau
- (Australia) George Gregan
- (Australia) Matt Henjak
- (Australia) Noah Lolesio
- (Australia) Salesi Ma'afu
- (Australia) Drew Mitchell
- (Australia) James O'Connor
- (Australia) Luke Rooney
- (Australia) George Smith
- (Australia) Jone Tawake
- (Australia) Lachlan Turner
- (Czech Republic) Martin Jágr
- (England) Delon Armitage
- (England) Steffon Armitage
- (England) Chris Ashton
- (England) Kris Chesney
- (England) Joe El-Abd
- (England) Nick Kennedy
- (England) Dan Luger
- (England) Tom May
- (England) Paul Sackey
- (England) Dean Schofield
- (England) Simon Shaw
- (England) Matt Stevens
- (England) Andrew Sheridan
- (England) Jonny Wilkinson
- (England) David Ribbans
- (Fiji) Sireli Bobo
- (Fiji) Sisa Koyamaibole
- (Fiji) Gabiriele Lovobalavu
- (Fiji) Semi Radradra
- (Fiji) Manasa Saulo
- (Fiji) Josua Tuisova
- (Georgia (country)) Levan Chilachava
- (Georgia (country)) Mamuka Gorgodze
- (Georgia (country)) Davit Kubriashvili
- (Georgia (country)) Konstantin Mikautadze
- (Georgia (country)) Ilia Zedginidze
- (Georgia (country)) Gia Labadze
- (Georgia (country)) Akvsenti Giorgadze
- (Germany) Damien Tussac
- (Ireland) Rob Henderson
- (Ireland) Paul O'Connell
- (Italy) Martin Castrogiovanni
- (Italy) Santiago Dellapè
- (Italy) Sergio Parisse
- (Japan) Ayumu Goromaru
- (Japan) Christian Loamanu
- (New Zealand) Jerry Collins
- (New Zealand) Malakai Fekitoa
- (New Zealand) Alby Mathewson
- (New Zealand) Carl Hayman
- (New Zealand) Chris Masoe
- (New Zealand) Leicester Fainga'anuku
- (New Zealand) Ihaia West
- (New Zealand) Andrew Mehrtens
- (New Zealand) Liam Messam
- (New Zealand) Ma'a Nonu
- (New Zealand) Anton Oliver
- (New Zealand) Julian Savea
- (New Zealand) Saimone Taumoepeau
- (New Zealand) Tana Umaga
- (New Zealand) Ali Williams
- (New Zealand) Sonny Bill Williams
- (New Zealand) Rudi Wulf
- (South Africa) Bakkies Botha
- (South Africa) Michael Claassens
- (South Africa) Eben Etzebeth
- (South Africa) Bryan Habana
- (South Africa) Cheslin Kolbe
- (South Africa) Juandré Kruger
- (South Africa) Victor Matfield
- (South Africa) JP Pietersen
- (South Africa) André Pretorius
- (South Africa) Danie Rossouw
- (South Africa) Lawrence Sephaka
- (South Africa) Juan Smith
- (South Africa) Marcel van der Merwe
- (South Africa) Joe van Niekerk
- (South Africa) Duane Vermeulen
- (South Africa) Lorne Ward
- (Romania) Radu Demian
- (Romania) Alin Petrache
- (Samoa) Alafoti Fa'osiliva
- (Samoa) Tusi Pisi
- (Samoa) Junior Polu
- (Samoa) David Smith
- (Scotland) Philip Fitzgerald
- (Scotland) Rory Lamont
- (French Polynesia) Makalea Foliaki(Academy)
- (French Polynesia) Jean-Teiva Jacquelain(Academy)
- (Tonga) Mafileo Kefu
- (United States) Samu Manoa
- (Wales) Leigh Halfpenny
- (Wales) Alun Wyn Jones
- (Wales) Gavin Henson
- (Wales) Gethin Jenkins
- (Wales) Dan Biggar
- (Wales) Jamie Robinson

== See also ==
- List of rugby union clubs in France
- Rugby union in France
