= Olympus Rugby XV Madrid =

Spanish rugby union club, based in Madrid

(Spain) Olympus Rugby XV Madrid
- Full name: Olympus Rugby XV Madrid
- Union: Spanish Rugby Federation
- Founded: 2009; 17 years ago
- Location: Madrid, Spain
- Ground(s): Estadio Nacional Complutense, Madrid, Spain (Capacity: 12,400)
- Coach: (England) Ged Glynn
- Captain: (Spain) Pablo Feijoo
- Top scorer: César Sempere (20 points)
- League: European Challenge Cup
- 2009–10: 4th in pool
Team kit

Largest defeat
- Olympus Madrid 0 – 66 Connacht (2010)

Official website
- www.olympusrugby.es

Olympus Rugby XV Madrid was a rugby union team that competed in the European Challenge Cup. The side was formed to play in the 2009–10 European Challenge Cup, consisting of footballers playing in the domestic Spanish leagues. After an absence of three seasons, it intended to participate in the 2013–14 European Challenge Cup, but was forced to withdraw due to financial issues.

== 2009/10 European Challenge Cup ==
Olympus Rugby XV Madrid competed in the 2009–10 season of the European Challenge Cup. The side was formed of footballers playing in the domestic Spanish leagues.

They lost all six of their pool matches and finished 4th in the pool table.

=== 2009/10 Pool table ===
Team	P	W	D	L	Tries for	Tries against	Try diff	Points for	Points against	Points diff	TB	LB	Pts
(Ireland) Connacht	6	6	0	0	28	5	+23	199	63	+136	2	0	26
(France) Montpellier	6	4	0	2	18	10	+8	158	92	+66	2	1	19
(England) Worcester Warriors	6	2	0	4	18	8	+10	140	83	+57	2	3	13
(Spain) Olympus Madrid	6	0	0	6	4	45	−41	44	303	−269	0	0	0
Source : www.ercrugby.com Points breakdown: *4 points for a win *2 points for a draw *1 bonus point for a loss by seven points or less *1 bonus point for scoring four or more tries in a match

=== 2009/10 Matches ===
9 October 2009
18:30

Connacht (Ireland)	46 – 6	(Spain) Olympus Madrid
	Score

The Sportsground, Galway
Attendance: 875

17 October 2009
16:30

Olympus Madrid (Spain)	5 – 38	(England) Worcester Warriors
	Score

Ciudad Universitaria, Madrid
Attendance: 5,300

11 December 2009
20:00

Montpellier (France)	57 – 24	(Spain) Olympus Madrid
	Score

Stade Yves du Manoir, Montpellier
Attendance: 6,832

19 December 2009
16:00

Olympus Madrid (Spain)	6 – 42	(France) Montpellier
	Score

Ciudad Universitaria, Madrid
Attendance: 3,000

16 January 2010
15:00

Worcester Warriors (England)	54 – 3	(Spain) Olympus Madrid
	Score

Sixways Stadium, Worcester
Attendance: 5,923

23 January 2010
16:00

Olympus Madrid (Spain)	0 – 66	(Ireland) Connacht
	Score

Ciudad Universitaria, Madrid
Attendance: 4,500

== 2013/14 European Challenge Cup ==
After an absence of three seasons, the team intended to participate in the 2013–14 season of the European Challenge Cup. In the draw carried out on 5 June 2013 at the Aviva Stadium in Dublin, Olympus Madrid was drawn in Pool 5 against France's Stade Français, England's London Irish and Italy's Cavalieri Prato. However, due to financial issues, the team withdrew from the competition and was replaced by Lusitanos XV on 2 September 2013.

== See also ==
- Spain national rugby union team
- Rugby union in Spain
