= Stade Mayol =

Stadium in Toulon, France

- Mayol
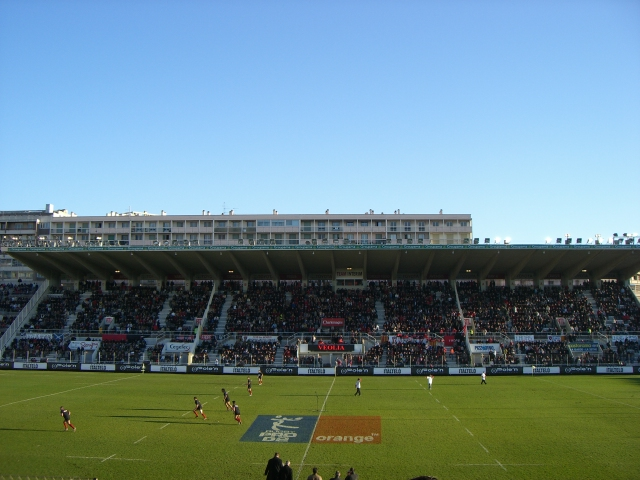
- Interactive map of Stade Mayol
- Coordinates: 43°7′8″N 5°56′12″E
- Owner: City of Toulon
- Capacity: 17,500
- Surface: grass
- Public transit: Toulon

Construction
- Groundbreaking: 1919
- Opened: 1920
- Renovated: 1947, 1965
- Expanded: 1983

Tenant
- RC Toulonnais

The Stade Mayol is a multi-purpose stadium in Toulon, France. It is currently used mostly for rugby union matches and is the home stadium of RC Toulonnais. The stadium is able to hold 17,500 people. It is one of the few French stadiums to be embedded in the city and surrounded by high buildings. It was built at the foot of the Mont Faron, the hill on which Toulon is partly built, and overlooks the Toulon military harbour (La Rade) on the Mediterranean.

== History ==
It is named after Félix Mayol, a concert hall singer from Toulon who had succeeded in Paris in the early 20th century. Félix bought a piece of land for the club on which the stadium would be built, using personal money and money raised by giving up the rights on some of his songs.

It was inaugurated on March 28, 1920 by the mayor of Toulon and Félix Mayol himself. A cross-country race was organised, as well as a soccer match between Stade Raphaëlois from Saint-Raphaël and the RC Toulon football team (4-0) and a rugby match between RCT and TOEC from Toulouse (3-3).

All Blacks and Wallaby tourists played matches there against regional South-East selections.

== Fans ==
The atmosphere is famous for a specific chant called Pilou pilou, created at the end of the 1940s by a club player, Marcel Bodrero, which describes the Toulon players as terrible primitive warriors coming down from the mountain towards the sea (exactly what Toulon's topography is). A cheerleader leads the chants and asks fans to answer and repeat the words. It generally comes up when players get on the pitch, then early in the game and also when the team's forwards, the club's historical forte, start to dominate. The chant may also occasionally be heard after the game. The club president Mourad Boudjellal famously led the Pilou pilou after a Toulon home victory over Racing Métro in 2008 that secured Toulon's promotion to the Top 14.

French	English translation
Ah ! Nous les terribles guerriers du Pilou-Pilou Qui descendons de la Montagne vers la Mer (Pilou-Pilou !); Avec nos femmes échevelées allaitant nos enfants Sous l'ombre des grands cocotiers blancs (Pilou-Pilou !); Nous les terribles guerriers poussons notre terrible cri de guerre (AAAARRRGGGGHHHHH !); J'ai dit NOTRE TERRIBLE CRI DE GUERRE ! (AAAARRRGGGGHHHHH !); Parce que TOULON (ROUGE !); Parce que TOULON (NOIR !); Parce que TOULON (ROUGE ET NOIR !)	Ah! We are the ruthless Pilou-Pilou warriors Coming down from the mountain to the sea (Pilou-Pilou!); With our dishevelled women breastfeeding our children Under the shade of the great white coconut trees (Pilou-Pilou!); We the ruthless warriors sing our ruthless war cry (AAAARRRGGGGHHHHH!); I said OUR RUTHLESS WAR CRY! (AAAARRRGGGGHHHHH!); Because Tou-lon (RED!); Because Tou-lon (BLACK!); Because Tou-lon (RED AND BLACK!)
