= 2013–14 Connacht Rugby season =

- Ground(s): Galway Sportsgrounds (Capacity: 7,800)
- Coach: Pat Lam
- Captain(s): September–November; Gavin Duffy; John Muldoon; Michael Swift; December–May; Craig Clarke
- Most appearances: Kieran Marmion; Dan Parks (both 28)
- Top scorer: Dan Parks (157)
- Most tries: Kieran Marmion (7)
- Pro12 Heineken Cup: 10th Pool stage (3rd)
1st kit	2nd kit	3rd kit

The 2013–14 Connacht Rugby season was the team's thirteenth season competing in the Pro12 as well as their third season to compete in the Heineken Cup. Following the departure of Eric Elwood, the 2013–14 season saw Pat Lam take charge of the team as head coach.

== Review ==
=== Background ===
The previous season's head coach Eric Elwood departed Connacht at the end of his third year in charge, having announced his intention to leave his post in October 2012. His replacement was announced in January 2013, with the New Zealand born former Samoa international Pat Lam appointed to coach the team. Lam had previously served as head coach to Super Rugby side the Auckland Blues, coaching them in the 2009 and 2010 seasons.

It was announced in August 2013 that the captaincy for the 2013–14 season would be split between Gavin Duffy, John Muldoon (rugby union, born 1982) and the team's most capped player, Michael Swift. This followed changes between Duffy and Muldoon as captain in previous seasons.

The team qualified for their third Heineken Cup in a row in 2013–14, again thanks to Leinster, who had also been the reason for Connacht's entry into the previous two tournaments. The eastern province's victory in the 2012–13 European Challenge Cup granted Connacht a berth, and they were drawn into pool 3 with Saracens, Toulouse, and Zebre.

=== Playing season ===
Lam's first competitive game in charge was in the 2013–14 Pro12, a 25–16 home win over Zebre. After this game Connacht failed to win their next five games, though they ran Saracens close in Galway, in the first Heineken Cup game of the season. Connacht eventually broke their losing streak with a win in the Heineken Cup, again coming against Zebre, this time in the Stadio XXV Aprile. In their next match, Connacht came close to beating Leinster in Dublin for the first time since 2002, but conceded a late penalty try to lose 16–13.

The team's patchy form continued after the derby with Leinster, and Connacht lost three more games in the Pro12. After a 43–10 defeat to Edinburgh in Murrayfield, former captain of the Super Rugby side the Chiefs, Craig Clarke, was made Connacht's team captain. On 8 December 2013, however, Connacht defied their form and produced one of the biggest shocks in the history of the Heineken Cup, when they defeated Toulouse in the pool stages in the Stade Ernest-Wallon.

Connacht were beaten by Toulouse in the return game at the Sportsground, but beat Zebre in the following game to go into the final round of matches with a slim chance of progressing to the quarter-finals. That game however, saw them beaten comfortably by Saracens on a final score of 64–6, with English side running in a record 11 tries. In the league Connacht continued to tussle with Zebre at the foot of the table, before going on a four match winning streak from 15 February to 23 March, earning three try bonus points. This was the team's longest run of wins in 11 years. Following this run of form though, Connacht failed to win another match in the league, finishing in tenth place and level on points with Newport Gwent Dragons in ninth.

== Coaching and Management Staff ==
Position	Name	Nationality
Head coach	Pat Lam	Samoa (Note: New Zealand-born and qualified for Samoa, Lam has represented both countries, but last played rugby for Samoa.)
Assistant Coach	Dan McFarland	England
Skills Coach	Dave Ellis	New Zealand
Chief Executive	vacant	
Team Manager	Tim Allnut	New Zealand
Academy Manager/ Eagles Head Coach	Nigel Carolan	Ireland
Resource Coach(es)	Cory Browne; Jimmy Duffy	New Zealand; Ireland
Head of Strength and Conditioning	Tom McLaughlin	England
Performance Analyst	Conor McPhillips	Ireland
Head Physio	Gavin Malouf	Australia

== Senior Playing Squad ==
Note: Flags indicate national union under World Rugby eligibility rules. Players may hold more than one non-World Rugby nationality.

Player	Position	Union
Jason Harris-Wright	Hooker	Ireland
Dave Heffernan	Hooker	Ireland
Seán Henry	Hooker	Ireland
James Rael	Hooker	Ireland
Rodney Ah You*	Prop	New Zealand
Denis Buckley	Prop	Ireland
JP Cooney	Prop	Ireland
**Ronan Loughney**	Prop	Ireland
Nathan White	Prop	New Zealand
Brett Wilkinson	Prop	Ireland
Andrew Browne	Lock	Ireland
Craig Clarke (c)	Lock	New Zealand
Mick Kearney	Lock	Ireland
Aly Muldowney*	Lock	England
David Nolan	Lock	Ireland
Michael Swift*	Lock	England
Danny Qualter	Lock	Ireland
Aaron Conneely	Flanker	Ireland
Mata Fafita*	Flanker	Tonga
Willie Faloon	Flanker	Ireland
Jake Heenan	Flanker	New Zealand
**John Muldoon**	Flanker	Ireland
Eoin McKeon	Number 8	Ireland
George Naoupu	Number 8	New Zealand

Player	Position	Union
Kieran Marmion	Scrum-half	Ireland
Frank Murphy	Scrum-half	Ireland
Paul O'Donohoe	Scrum-half	Ireland
Miah Nikora*	Fly-half	New Zealand
**Dan Parks**	Fly-half	Scotland
Craig Ronaldson	Fly-half	Ireland
Eoin Griffin	Centre	Ireland
**Robbie Henshaw**	Centre	Ireland
Dave McSharry	Centre	Ireland
Brian Murphy	Centre	Ireland
Kyle Tonetti	Centre	Ireland
Fionn Carr	Wing	Ireland
Matt Healy	Wing	Ireland
Tiernan O'Halloran	Wing	Ireland
Danie Poolman	Wing	South Africa
**Gavin Duffy**	Fullback	Ireland
**James So'oialo**	Fullback	Samoa

- Players qualified to play for Ireland on dual nationality or residency grounds*.
- Senior 15's internationally capped players in bold.

=== Academy squad ===
Note: Flags indicate national union under World Rugby eligibility rules. Players may hold more than one non-World Rugby nationality.

Player	Position	Union
Finlay Bealham	Prop	Ireland year 2
Peter Reilly	Prop	Ireland year 2
Jamie Dever	Prop	Ireland year 2
Saba Meunargia	Prop	Ireland year 1
Jacob Walshe	Prop	Ireland year 1
Ultan Dillane	Lock	Ireland year 2
Conor Kindregan	Lock	Ireland year 1
Seán O'Brien	Lock	Ireland year 1
James Connolly	Flanker	Ireland year 1
Rory Moloney	Flanker	Ireland year 1
Eoghan Masterson	Number 8	Scotland year 1

Player	Position	Union
Marcus Walsh	Scrum-half	Ireland year 2
Caolin Blade	Scrum-half	Ireland year 1
Jack Carty	Fly-half	Ireland year 3
Conor Finn	Centre	Ireland year 3
Tadhg Leader	Centre	Ireland year 3
Rory Parata	Centre	Ireland year 1
Shane Layden	Wing	Ireland year 3
Steve McCauley	Wing	England year 2
Darragh Leader	Fullback	Ireland year 2
David Panter	Fullback	Ireland year 1

== Preseason transfers ==
=== Senior Players In ===
- HK (Ireland) Dave Heffernan promoted from academy
- HK (Ireland) Seán Henry from (Ireland) Munster
- HK (Ireland) James Rael from (Ireland) Munster Academy
- LK (New Zealand) Craig Clarke from (New Zealand) Chiefs
- LK (England) Aly Muldowney from (England) Exeter Chiefs
- LK (Ireland) Danny Qualter promoted from academy
- FL (Ireland) Aaron Conneely promoted from academy
- FL (New Zealand) Jake Heenan from (New Zealand) Blues Academy
- SH (Ireland) Kieran Marmion promoted from academy
- FH (Ireland) Craig Ronaldson from (Ireland) Lansdowne
- CE (Ireland) Robbie Henshaw promoted from academy
- WG (Ireland) Fionn Carr from (Ireland) Leinster
- FB (Samoa) James So'oialo from (New Zealand) Northern United

=== Senior Players Out ===
- HK (Ireland) Adrian Flavin retired
- HK (South Africa) Ethienne Reynecke to (South Africa) Free State Cheetahs
- LK (Ireland) Dave Gannon to (United States) Life Running Eagles
- LK (Ireland) Mike McCarthy to (Ireland) Leinster
- FL (Ireland) TJ Anderson to (England) Ealing Trailfinders
- FL (Ireland) Eoghan Grace to (England) Plymouth Albion
- FL (Ireland) Johnny O'Connor retired
- SH (Ireland) Dave Moore to undeclared
- FH (Wales) Matthew Jarvis to (England) Nottingham
- WG (Wales) James Loxton to (Wales) Cardiff
- WG (Ireland) Mark McCrea to Jersey
- WG (Tonga) Fetuʻu Vainikolo to (England) Exeter Chiefs
- FB (Samoa) James So'oialo to (New Zealand) Tawa

== Playing kit ==
The Connacht team and support staff kit supplier for the season was Australian manufacturer BLK sport, who announced a comprehensive four-year agreement to supply the full range of apparel for all of Connacht Rugby's representative teams and support staff in 2013. They took the place of previous supplier RugbyTech.

Mazda Ireland continued as the main shirt sponsors, as part of a deal signed with Connacht to run from 2012 to 2014 as part of major sponsorship deal to facilitate the development of both brands.

== 2013–14 Pro12 ==
Pro12 Table
	Team	Played	Won	Drawn	Lost	Points For	Points Against	Points Difference	Tries For	Tries Against	Try Bonus	Losing Bonus	Points
1	(Ireland) Leinster (CH)	22	17	1	4	554	352	+202	57	30	8	4	82
2	(Scotland) Glasgow Warriors (RU)	22	18	0	4	484	309	+175	53	22	4	3	79
3	(Ireland) Munster (SF)	22	16	0	6	538	339	+199	56	27	7	3	74
4	(Ireland) Ulster (SF)	22	15	0	7	470	319	+151	45	26	6	4	70
5	(Wales) Ospreys	22	13	1	8	571	388	+183	59	32	6	6	66
6	(Wales) Scarlets	22	11	1	10	435	438	−3	43	45	3	6	55
7	(Wales) Cardiff Blues	22	8	1	13	425	538	−113	32	55	1	6	41
8	(Scotland) Edinburgh	22	7	0	15	397	526	−129	38	57	2	8	38
9	(Wales) Newport Gwent Dragons	22	7	1	14	392	492	−100	34	46	0	5	35
10	(Ireland) Connacht	22	6	0	16	371	509	−138	42	54	4	7	35
11	(Italy) Benetton Treviso	22	5	1	16	376	591	−215	31	72	1	7	30
12	(Italy) Zebre	22	5	2	15	347	559	−212	35	59	0	5	29
If teams are level at any stage, tiebreakers are applied in the following order: 1. number of matches won; 2. the difference between points for and points against; 3. the number of tries scored; 4. the most points scored; 5. the difference between tries for and tries against; 6. the fewest red cards received; 7. the fewest yellow cards received.
Green background (rows 1 to 4) are play-off places, and earn a place in the European Rugby Champions Cup. Blue background indicates teams outside the play-off places, that earn a place in the European Rugby Champions Cup. Plain background indicates teams that earn a place in the European Rugby Challenge Cup. European Rugby Champions/Challenge Cup qualification: The top team from each country, plus the three highest-placed teams apart from those, will qualify for the European Rugby Champions Cup. The remaining teams qualify for the European Rugby Challenge Cup. Updated 19 May 2014. Source: RaboDirect PRO12

The weekend dates for the 2013–14 season were announced on 19 July 2013. All times are local.

7 September 2013
17:00

Connacht (Ireland)	25–16	(Italy) Zebre
Try: White 4' m Healy 29' c Carr 75' c Con: Parks (2/3); Pen: Parks (2/4) 37', 62'	Report	Try: Manici 80' c Con: Orquera (1/1); Pen: Orquera (3/3) 7', 46', 60'

Galway Sportsgrounds
Attendance: 4,084
Referee: Rhys Thomas (WRU)

13 September 2013
19:05

Cardiff Blues (Wales)	21–10	(Ireland) Connacht
Pen: Patchell (6/9) 20', 26', 52', 67', 74', 78'; Drop: Patchell (1/1) 33'	Report	Try: Healy 12' c Con: Parks (1/1); Pen: Parks (1/3) 40'

Cardiff Arms Park
Attendance: 6,874
Referee: Claudio Blessano (FIR)

21 September 2013
18:45

Connacht (Ireland)	7–18	(Ireland) Ulster
Try: Parks 10' c Con: Parks (1/1)	Report	Try: Allen 15' m Jackson 57' c Con: Jackson (1/2); Pen: Jackson (2/4) 55', 64'

Galway Sportsgrounds
Attendance: 5,485
Referee: John Lacey (IRFU)

28 September 2013
17:00

Connacht (Ireland)	26–43	(Wales) Ospreys (1 BP)
Try: Poolman 55' c Marmion 62' c Con: Parks (2/2); Pen: Ronaldson (4/5) 4', 26', 32', 37'	Report	Try: Biggar 7' c Fussell 15' c Walker 29' m Tebaldi 59' c Hassler 71' c A. W. Jones 77' c Con: Biggar (5/6); Pen: Biggar (1/1) 35'

Galway Sportsgrounds
Attendance: 3,888
Referee: Andrew McMenemy (SRU)

4 October 2013
20:30

Benetton Treviso (Italy)	23–3	(Ireland) Connacht
Try: Zanni 52' c Morisi 79' c Con: Botes (2/2); Pen: Di Bernardo (3/3) 8', 34', 40'	Report	Pen: Parks (1/2) 51'

Stadio Comunale di Monigo
Attendance: 3,948
Referee: Neil Hennessy (WRU)

26 October 2013
18:45

Leinster (Ireland)	16–13	(Ireland) Connacht (1 BP)
Try: penalty try 77' c Con: Madigan (1/1); Pen: Madigan (3/4) 10', 29', 40'	Report	Try: Marmion 13' c Con: Parks (1/1); Pen: Parks (2/3) 2', 7'

RDS Arena
Attendance: 16,780
Referee: David Wilkinson (IRFU)

2 November 2013
17:00

(1 BP) Connacht (Ireland)	12–19	(Scotland) Glasgow Warriors
Pen: Parks (2/4) 15', 51'; Ronaldson (2/3) 61', 69'	Report	Try: van der Merwe 5' c Con: Weir (1/1); Pen: Weir (4/4) 24', 33', 55', 79'

Galway Sportsgrounds
Attendance: 4,185
Referee: Neil Paterson (SRU)

23 November 2013
17:00

(1 BP) Connacht (Ireland)	21–24	(Wales) Scarlets
Try: Healy 56' c Harris-Wright 67' m Con: Ronaldson (1/1); Pen: Ronaldson (3/4) 3', 9', 34'	Report	Try: Climo 38' c Myhill 47' c G. Davies 52' c Con: A. Thomas (3/3); Pen: A. Thomas (1/1) 21'

Galway Sportsgrounds
Attendance: 4,172
Referee: Matteo Liperini (FIR)

29 November 2013
19:45

(1 BP) Edinburgh (Scotland)	43–10	(Ireland) Connacht
Try: Fife 40' c du Preez 73' c De Luca 77' c Nel 79' c Con: Laidlaw (4/4); Pen: Laidlaw (5/5) 9', 20', 29', 51', 59'	Report	Try: Henshaw 15' c Con: Parks (1/1); Drop: Parks (1/1) 11'

Murrayfield Stadium
Attendance: 3,515
Referee: Leighton Hodges (WRU)

21 December 2013
17:00

Connacht (Ireland)	14–11	(Wales) Newport Gwent Dragons (1 BP)
Try: Carr 75' m Pen: Parks (2/3) 33', 44'; Drop: Parks (1/1) 80'	Report	Try: D. Evans 8' m Pen: Tovey (2/3) 16', 51'

Galway Sportsgrounds
Attendance: 4,033
Referee: Alain Rolland (IRFU)

27 December 2013
19:15

Munster (Ireland)	22–16	(Ireland) Connacht (1 BP)
Try: Hanrahan 20' c Con: Hanrahan (1/1); Pen: Hanrahan (5/5) 9', 29', 44', 50', 76'	Report	Try: Heffernan 80' c Con: Parks (1/1); Pen: Parks (3/3) 13', 16', 61'

Thomond Park
Attendance: 18,870
Referee: Dudley Phillips (IRFU)

4 January 2014
19:15

Connacht (Ireland)	8–16	(Ireland) Leinster
Try: Carr 22' m Pen: Carty (1/1) 40'	Report	Try: D'Arcy 73' c Con: Gopperth (1/1); Pen: Madigan (1/3) 36'; Gopperth (2/2) 57', 63'

Galway Sportsgrounds
Attendance: 7,210
Referee: George Clancy (IRFU)

9 February 2014
14:00

Glasgow Warriors (Scotland)	8–6	(Ireland) Connacht (1 BP)
Try: Bennett 18' m Pen: Jackson (1/4) 43'	Report	Pen: Ronaldson (2/5) 8', 40'

Scotstoun Stadium
Attendance: 3,904
Referee: Leighton Hodges (WRU)

15 February 2014
17:00

Connacht (Ireland)	11–7	(Scotland) Edinburgh (1 BP)
Try: Swift 47' m Pen: Ronaldson (1/4) 20'; Parks (1/1) 68'	Report	Try: Grant 7' c Con: Bezuidenhout (1/1)

Galway Sportsgrounds
Attendance: 4,038
Referee: Claudio Blessano (FIR)

23 February 2014
17:30

Zebre (Italy)	19–27	(Ireland) Connacht (1 BP)
Try: Venditti 58' c Vunisa 66' m van Schalkwyk 78' c Con: Nathan (1/2); Chillon (1/1)	Report	Try: Ah You 5' m Marmion 26' c penalty try 37' c Griffin 56' m Con: Parks (2/4); Pen: Parks (1/1) 3'

Stadio XXV Aprile
Attendance: 1,265
Referee: Ian Davies (WRU)

1 March 2014
17:00

(1 BP) Connacht (Ireland)	38–6	(Italy) Benetton Treviso
Try: Carr 5' c Muldoon (2) 13' c, 63' c Marmion 33' c McKeon 75' c Con: Parks (4/4); Nikora (1/1); Pen: Parks (1/1) 23'	Report	Pen: Berquist (2/3) 9', 21'

Galway Sportsgrounds
Attendance: 3,850
Referee: Leighton Hodges (WRU)

23 March 2014
15:05

Newport Gwent Dragons (Wales)	8–24	(Ireland) Connacht (1 BP)
Try: Prydie 69' m Pen: Tovey (1/2) 2'	Report	Try: Muldoon (2) 17' c, 67' m Ah You 23' c Swift 79' m Con: Parks (2/2)

Rodney Parade
Attendance: 5,474
Referee: George Clancy (IRFU)

30 March 2014
14:05

(1 BP) Scarlets (Wales)	32–30	(Ireland) Connacht (2 BP)
Try: J. Davies 2' c G. Davies 49' c Turnbull 52' m Maule 79' c Con: Priestland (3/4); Pen: Priestland (2/5) 24', 34'	Report	Try: Marmion 55' m Carr 72' c Henshaw 75' m McKeon 80' c Con: Nikora (2/3); Pen: Parks (2/2) 6', 22'

Parc y Scarlets
Attendance: 6,111
Referee: Neil Paterson (SRU)

11 April 2014
19:05

(1 BP) Ulster (Ireland)	58–12	(Ireland) Connacht
Try: P. Marshall (2) 5' m, 25' c Trimble (3) 16' m, 42' c, 59' c Bowe 23' c L. Marshall 48' c Gilroy 68' c Con: Jackson (5/7); McKinney (1/1); Pen: Jackson (2/2) 12', 40'	Report	Try: McSharry 8' m Leader 62' c Con: Nikora (1/1)

Ravenhill Stadium
Attendance: 13,948
Referee: Ian Davies (WRU)

19 April 2014
18:15

Connacht (Ireland)	23–32	(Ireland) Munster (1 BP)
Try: Healy 20' m McKeon 53' m Poolman 78' c Con: Parks (1/1); Pen: Nikora (2/2) 15', 63'	Report	Try: Conway 17' c van den Heever 34' c D. Hurley 38' c Butler 72' m Con: Keatley (3/4); Pen: Keatley (2/2) 26', 30'

Galway Sportsgrounds
Attendance: 6,227
Referee: Marius Mitrea (FIR)

3 May 2014
17:00

(1 BP) Connacht (Ireland)	15–22	(Wales) Cardiff Blues
Try: Healy 26' c Henshaw 45' m Con: Nikora (1/2); Pen: Nikora (1/1) 22'	Report	Try: penalty try 56' c Jones 59' c Fish 69' m Con: G. Davies (2/2); Pen: G. Davies (1/1) 40'

Galway Sportsgrounds
Attendance: 5,168
Referee: Neil Paterson (SRU)

10 May 2014
18:30

(1 BP) Ospreys (Wales)	45–20	(Ireland) Connacht
Try: Hassler 12' c Beck (2) 27' c, 45' c A. W. Jones 36' c N. Smith 60' c Baker 68' c Con: Biggar (6/6); Pen: Biggar (1/1) 34'	Report	Try: Leader 17' m Buckley 40' c Gilsenan 63' m Con: Nikora (1/3); Pen: Nikora (1/1) 4'

Liberty Stadium
Attendance: 6,403
Referee: Andrew McMenemy (SRU)

== 2013–14 Heineken Cup ==
Pool 3

Team	P	W	D	L	PF	PA	Diff	TF	TA	TB	LB	Pts
(France) Toulouse (5)	6	5	0	1	143	63	+80	16	4	2	1	23
(England) Saracens (8)	6	4	0	2	217	74	+143	29	5	3	1	20
(Ireland) Connacht	6	3	0	3	101	147	−46	7	20	0	1	13
(Italy) Zebre	6	0	0	6	33	210	−177	2	25	0	0	0
Source : www.ercrugby.com Points breakdown: *4 points for a win *2 points for a draw *1 bonus point for a loss by seven points or less *1 bonus point for scoring four or more tries in a match

11 October 2013
20:00

(1 BP) Connacht (Ireland)	17–23	(England) Saracens
Try: Marmion 17' c Poolman 30' c Con: Parks (2/2); Pen: Parks (1/2) 7'	Report	Try: Wyles 5' c Ashton 8' c Con: Farrell (2/2); Pen: Farrell (3/3) 25', 52', 74'

The Sportsground
Attendance: 7,546
Referee: Pascal Gaüzère (FFR)

19 October 2013
14:35

Zebre (Italy)	6–33	(Ireland) Connacht
Pen: Orquera (2/2) 5', 48'	Report	Try: Naoupu 29' c Fafita 70' m Con: Parks (1/2); Pen: Parks (7/7) 1', 7', 34', 37', 58', 60', 64'

Stadio XXV Aprile
Attendance: 2,000
Referee: Ian Davies (WRU)

8 December 2013
16:00

(1 BP) Toulouse (France)	14–16	(Ireland) Connacht
Try: Barraque 39' c Dusautoir 64' c Con: Barraque (1/1); Beauxis (1/1)	Report	Try: Marmion 47' c Con: Parks (1/1); Pen: Parks (2/3) 12', 45'; Drop: Parks (1/2) 15'

Stade Ernest-Wallon
Attendance: 16,742
Referee: Marius Mitrea (FIR)

14 December 2013
18:00

Connacht (Ireland)	9–37	(France) Toulouse (1 BP)
Pen: Parks (1/2) 2'; Drop: Parks (2/2) 13', 32'	Report	Try: Médard (2) 11' c, 26' m Tolofua 36' c Picamoles 54' m Fickou 78' c Con: Beauxis (3/5); Pen: Beauxis (2/4) 4', 72'

The Sportsground
Attendance: 7,661
Referee: Leighton Hodges (WRU)

11 January 2014
15:40

Connacht (Ireland)	20–3	(Italy) Zebre
Try: Healy 34' c Henshaw 42' c Con: Carty (2/2); Pen: Carty (2/3) 24', 29'	Report	Pen: Orquera (1/2) 15'

The Sportsground
Attendance: 5,217
Referee: Neil Paterson (SRU)

18 January 2014
13:35

(1 BP) Saracens (England)	64–6	(Ireland) Connacht
Try: Ashton (2) 10' m, 80' c Strettle (3) 26' m, 41' m, 76' m Brits 40' m Goode 49' m Kruis 57' c Wyles 65' m Wray 68' c Johnston 71' m Con: Hodgson (3/10); Pen: Hodgson (1/2) 22'	Report	Pen: Parks (2/2) 5', 20'

Allianz Park
Attendance: 9,614
Referee: Leighton Hodges (WRU)

== See also ==
- 2013–14 Munster Rugby season
