= List of 2014–15 Pro12 transfers =

This is a list of player transfers involving Pro12 teams before or during the 2014–15 season.

== Benetton Treviso ==
=== Players in ===
- (Italy) Davide Giazzon from (Italy) Zebre
- (Argentina) Bruno Mercanti from (Italy) Petrarca Padova
- (Argentina) Romulo Acosta from (Italy) Petrarca Padova
- (Australia) Albert Anae from (Australia) Reds
- (Argentina) Josè Francisco Novak from (Italy) Petrarca Padova
- (England) Rupert Harden from (England) Gloucester
- (Australia) Salesi Manu from (Australia) Western Force
- (Italy) Matteo Zanusso from (Italy) Amatori San Donà
- (South Africa) Meyer Swanepoel from (Italy) Mogliano
- (Argentina) Tomás Vallejos from (Japan) Coca-Cola Red Sparks
- (Italy) Marco Barbini from (Italy) Mogliano
- (New Zealand) Leo Auva'a from (Ireland) Leinster
- (New Zealand) Matt Luamanu from (Japan) Kyuden Voltex
- (Italy) Alberto Lucchese from (Italy) Mogliano
- (Fiji) Henry Seniloli from (Fiji) Tailevu Knights
- (England) Joe Carlisle from (England) Wasps
- (Italy) Simone Ragusi from (Italy) Rovigo Delta
- (Italy) Enrico Bacchin from (Italy) Mogliano
- (New Zealand) Jayden Hayward from (Australia) Western Force
- (New Zealand) Sam Christie from (New Zealand) Waikato
- (Italy) Ruggero Trevisan from (Italy) Zebre
- (Italy) Amar Kudin from (Italy) Mogliano
- (Italy) Marco Lazzaroni from (Italy) Mogliano
- (Scotland) D'Arcy Rae from (Scotland) Glasgow Warriors
- (Italy) Nicola Cattina unattached

=== Players out ===
- (Italy) Tobias Botes to (South Africa) Eastern Province Kings
- (Italy) Alberto De Marchi to (England) Sale Sharks
- (Italy) Lorenzo Cittadini to (England) Wasps
- (Italy) Luke McLean to (England) Sale Sharks
- (Australia) Brendan Williams retired
- (Italy) Manoa Vosawai to (Wales) Cardiff Blues
- (Japan) Christian Loamanu to (England) Leicester Tigers
- (Italy) Leonardo Ghiraldini to (England) Leicester Tigers
- (Italy) Robert Barbieri to (England) Leicester Tigers
- (Italy) Michele Rizzo to (England) Leicester Tigers
- (Italy) Alberto Di Bernardo to (France) Lille MR
- (Italy) Valerio Bernabò to (Italy) Zebre
- (New Zealand) Matt Berquist to (New Zealand) Hawke's Bay
- (Italy) Enrico Ceccato to (Italy) Rovigo Delta
- (Italy) Pedro Di Santo to (Argentina) Uru Curè
- (Italy) Marco Filippucci to (Italy) Mogliano
- (Italy) Fabio Semenzato to (Italy) Mogliano
- (Italy) Ignacio Fernandez Rouyet to (Italy) Mogliano
- (Italy) Franco Sbaraglini released
- (Scotland) D'Arcy Rae to (Scotland) Glasgow Warriors (from March 2015)

== Cardiff Blues ==
=== Players in ===
- (Wales) Craig Mitchell from (England) Exeter Chiefs
- (Wales) Ieuan Jones from (Wales) Newport Gwent Dragons
- Adam Thomas from Wales Sevens
- (Scotland) George Watkins from (England) Bristol Rugby
- (Wales) Tavis Knoyle from (England) Gloucester Rugby
- (Wales) Josh Turnbull from (Wales) Scarlets
- (New Zealand) Jarrad Hoeata from (New Zealand) Highlanders
- (Italy) Manoa Vosawai from (Italy) Benetton Treviso
- (Wales) Geraint Walsh from (Wales) Pontypridd
- (New Zealand) Gareth Anscombe from (New Zealand) Chiefs
- (Wales) Adam Jones from (Wales) Ospreys
- (Argentina) Lucas González Amorosino from (France) Oyonnax

=== Players out ===
- (Wales) Andries Pretorius to (England) Worcester Warriors
- (Wales) Leigh Halfpenny to (France) Toulon
- (Ireland) Robin Copeland to (Ireland) Munster
- (Wales) Bradley Davies to (England) London Wasps
- (Wales) Harry Robinson to (Wales) Scarlets
- (Wales) Chris Czekaj to (France) US Colomiers
- (Wales) Luke Hamilton to (France) SU Agen
- (Wales) Alex Walker to (England) Ealing Trailfinders
- (Wales) James Down to (England) London Welsh
- (France) Benoit Bourrust to (France) La Rochelle
- (Samoa) Isaia Tuifua

== Connacht ==
=== Players in ===
- (Ireland) Jack Carty promoted from academy
- (New Zealand) Bundee Aki from (New Zealand) Chiefs
- (Ireland) Finlay Bealham promoted from academy
- (Ireland) Conor Finn promoted from academy
- (Ireland) Darragh Leader promoted from academy
- (New Zealand) Tom McCartney from (New Zealand) Blues
- (Canada) Shane O'Leary from (France) Grenoble
- (Ireland) Ian Porter from (Ireland) Ulster
- (New Zealand) Mils Muliaina from (New Zealand) Chiefs
- (Ireland) John Cooney from (Ireland) Leinster (loan)
- (South Africa) Quinn Roux from (Ireland) Leinster (loan)
- (Nigeria) Niyi Adeolokun from (Ireland) Dublin University
- (Ireland) Shane Layden promoted from academy

=== Players out ===
- (Ireland) Eoin Griffin to (England) London Irish
- (Ireland) Kyle Tonetti retired
- (Ireland) Brett Wilkinson retired
- (Ireland) Aaron Conneely to (Ireland) Lansdowne
- (Ireland) Gavin Duffy to Mayo Football
- (Ireland) Brian Murphy to (Ireland) Galwegians
- (Ireland) Frank Murphy retired
- (Ireland) Dave Nolan to (France) Bourgoin
- (Ireland) Paul O'Donohoe retired
- (Scotland) Dan Parks retired
- (Ireland) James Rael to (Ireland) Lansdowne
- (New Zealand) Craig Clarke retired

== Edinburgh ==
=== Players in ===
- (Scotland) Neil Cochrane from (England) London Wasps
- (Ireland) John Andress from (England) Worcester Warriors
- (Scotland) Rory Sutherland from (Scotland) Gala RFC
- (Scotland) Tom Heathcote from (England) Bath Rugby
- (Scotland) Michael Tait from (England) Newcastle Falcons
- (Scotland) Fraser McKenzie from (England) Newcastle Falcons
- (Scotland) Jamie Ritchie from (Scotland) Howe of Fife RFC
- (New Zealand) Phil Burleigh from (New Zealand) Highlanders
- (Namibia) Anton Bresler from (South Africa) Sharks
- (United States) Brett Thompson from (United States) USA Sevens

=== Players out ===
- (Scotland) Steven Lawrie retired
- (Scotland) Alun Walker released
- (Scotland) Alex Allan to (Scotland) Glasgow Warriors
- (Scotland) Geoff Cross to (England) London Irish
- (Scotland) Lewis Niven released
- (England) Sean Cox to (England) London Irish
- (Scotland) Robert McAlpine released
- (England) Perry Parker to (England) Rotherham Titans
- (South Africa) Izak van der Westhuizen released
- (Scotland) Ross Rennie to (England) Bristol Rugby
- (Georgia (country)) Dimitri Basilaia to (France) Perpignan
- (Scotland) Alex Black released
- (Scotland) Greig Laidlaw to (England) Gloucester Rugby
- (England) Chris Leck released
- (England) Piers Francis released
- (Scotland) Gregor Hunter released
- (Scotland) Harry Leonard to (England) Yorkshire Carnegie
- (Scotland) Ben Cairns retired
- (Scotland) Nick De Luca to (France) Biarritz
- (Scotland) Lee Jones to (Scotland) Glasgow Warriors
- (Tonga) Aleki Lutui to (England) Gloucester Rugby
- (Wales) John Yapp to (England) Wasps
- (Namibia) Wicus Blaauw released

== Glasgow Warriors ==
=== Players in ===
- (Scotland) Alex Allan from (Scotland) Edinburgh
- (Scotland) Lee Jones from (Scotland) Edinburgh
- (Scotland) Murray McConnell from (Scotland) Ayr RFC
- (Scotland) Euan Murray from (England) Worcester Warriors
- (Ireland) James Downey from (Ireland) Munster
- (South Africa) Rossouw de Klerk from (South Africa) Cheetahs
- (Canada) Connor Braid from (Canada) BC Bears

=== Players out ===
- (Scotland) Moray Low to (England) Exeter Chiefs
- (Scotland) Chris Cusiter to (England) Sale Sharks
- (Scotland) Ruaridh Jackson to (England) Wasps
- (Scotland) Ed Kalman retired
- (Scotland) Byron McGuigan released
- (Scotland) Finlay Gillies released
- Scott Wight to Scotland Sevens
- (Argentina) Gabriel Ascárate released
- (United States) Carlin Isles to (United States) USA Sevens
- (United States) Folau Niua to (United States) USA Sevens
- (Scotland) D'Arcy Rae to (Italy) Benetton Treviso

== Leinster ==
=== Players in ===
- (Ireland) Sam Coghlan Murray promoted from academy
- (Ireland) Jack Conan promoted from academy
- (Australia) Kane Douglas from (Australia) NSW Waratahs
- (Ireland) Tadhg Furlong promoted from academy
- (Ireland) Seán McCarthy from (England) Jersey
- (Ireland) Luke McGrath promoted from academy
- (Ireland) Tyrone Moran from (Ireland) Lansdowne
- (Ireland) Collie O'Shea promoted from academy
- (Samoa) Ben Te'o from (Australia) South Sydney Rabbitohs
- (Ireland) James Tracy promoted from academy

=== Players out ===
- (New Zealand) Leo Auva'a to (Italy) Benetton Treviso
- (Ireland) Andrew Boyle to be confirmed
- (Ireland) John Cooney to (Ireland) Connacht (loan)
- (Ireland) Leo Cullen retired
- (Ireland) Conor Gilsenan to (England) London Irish
- (New Zealand) Andrew Goodman to be confirmed
- (Ireland) Darren Hudson to (England) Bristol Rugby
- (Ireland) Jack O'Connell to (England) Bristol Rugby
- (Ireland) Brian O'Driscoll retired
- (South Africa) Quinn Roux to (Ireland) Connacht (loan)

== Munster ==
=== Players in ===
- (Argentina) Eusebio Guiñazú from (England) Bath
- (Ireland) Martin Kelly from (Ireland) Dublin University
- (Ireland) Shane Buckley promoted from Academy
- (Ireland) Robin Copeland from (Wales) Cardiff Blues
- (Ireland) Jonathan Holland promoted from Academy
- (New Zealand) Tyler Bleyendaal from (New Zealand) Crusaders
- (Australia) Andrew Smith from (Australia) Brumbies

=== Players out ===
- (Ireland) James Coughlan to (France) Pau
- (Ireland) Ian Nagle to Club To Be Confirmed
- (Ireland) Niall Ronan Retiring due to injury
- (Ireland) James Downey to (Scotland) Glasgow Warriors
- (New Zealand) Casey Laulala to (France) Racing Métro
- (New Zealand) Quentin MacDonald to (New Zealand) Chiefs

== Newport Gwent Dragons ==
=== Players in ===
- (Wales) Aled Brew from (France) Biarritz Olympique
- (Wales) Lee Byrne from (France) Clermont Auvergne
- (Wales) Rhys Buckley from (England) Moseley
- (England) Boris Stankovich from (England) Leicester Tigers
- (Wales) Ian Gough from (England) London Irish
- (Scotland) Dave Young from (England) Jersey
- (South Africa) Rynard Landman from (South Africa) Free State Cheetahs
- (England) Lloyd Fairbrother from (England) Exeter Chiefs
- (Wales) Andy Powell from (England) Wigan Warriors
- (South Africa) Brok Harris from (South Africa) Western Province / Stormers

=== Players out ===
- (Wales) Ieuan Jones to (Wales) Cardiff Blues
- (Wales) Will Harries released
- (Wales) Sam Parry to (Wales) Ospreys
- (Wales) Dan Evans to (Wales) Ospreys
- (Wales) Steffan Jones loan to (England) Bedford Blues
- (Wales) Robert Sidoli retired
- (Wales) Jevon Groves released
- (Wales) Darren Waters to (England) London Welsh
- (Italy) Kris Burton released
- (Wales) Lewis Robling to (England) Jersey

== Ospreys ==
=== Players in ===
- (Wales) Sam Parry from (Wales) Newport Gwent Dragons
- (Wales) Dan Evans from (Wales) Newport Gwent Dragons
- (Fiji) Josh Matavesi from (England) Worcester Warriors
- (South Africa) Rynier Bernardo from (South Africa) Eastern Province Kings
- (Wales) Gareth Thomas from (Wales) Carmarthen Quins
- (Wales) Cai Griffiths from (England) London Welsh
- (Wales) Martin Roberts from (England) Bath Rugby
- (South Africa) De Kock Steenkamp from (South Africa) Stormers

=== Players out ===
- (Wales) Richard Hibbard to (England) Gloucester Rugby
- (Wales) Joe Rees to (England) Worcester Warriors
- (Wales) Matthew Morgan to (England) Bristol Rugby
- (Wales) Ryan Jones to (England) Bristol Rugby
- (Wales) Tom Isaacs to (England) Gloucester Rugby
- (Wales) Ian Evans to (England) Bristol Rugby
- (Wales) Adam Jones to (Wales) Cardiff Blues
- (Italy) Tito Tebaldi to (England) Harlequins

== Scarlets ==
=== Players in ===
- (New Zealand) Regan King from (France) Clermont Auvergne
- (Wales) Harry Robinson from (Wales) Cardiff Blues
- (England) Peter Edwards from (England) London Welsh
- (Wales) Rory Pitman from (England) Wasps
- (Tonga) Chris Hala'ufia from (England) London Irish
- (Fiji) Michael Tagicakibau from (England) Saracens
- (New Zealand) Hadleigh Parkes from (New Zealand) Auckland

=== Players out ===
- (Wales) Jonathan Davies to (France) Clermont Auvergne
- (Wales) Josh Turnbull to (Wales) Cardiff Blues
- (Wales) Aled Thomas to (England) Gloucester Rugby
- (Fiji) Deacon Manu to Hong Kong Cricket Club (Head Coach)
- (Tonga) Sione Timani to (France) Tarbes
- (Wales) Gareth Thomas to (Wales) Ospreys
- (Wales) Nic Reynolds to (England) London Welsh
- (England) Olly Barkley to (England) London Welsh
- (Wales) Gareth Maule to (England) Bristol Rugby

== Ulster ==
=== Players in ===
- (Ireland) Ian Humphreys from (England) London Irish
- (Ireland) Ruaidhrí Murphy from (Australia) Brumbies
- (South Africa) Wiehahn Herbst from (South Africa) Sharks
- (Ireland) Dave Ryan from (Italy) Zebre
- (South Africa) Franco van der Merwe from (South Africa) Lions
- (South Africa) Louis Ludik from (France) Agen
- (Ireland) Charlie Butterworth from (Ireland) Lansdowne
- (New Zealand) Sean Reidy from (New Zealand) Counties Manukau
- (South Africa) Devin Montgomery from (South Africa) Wits
- (New Zealand) Tim Boys from (New Zealand) Southland
- (Samoa) Michael Stanley from (New Zealand) Counties Manukau
- (Ireland) Conor Joyce from academy
- (Ireland) Stuart McCloskey from academy
- (Ireland) Kyle McCall from academy
- (Ireland) Peter Nelson from academy
- (Ireland) Bronson Ross from academy
- (Ireland) Rory Scholes from academy
- (Ireland) James Simpson from academy
- (Ireland) Andrew Warwick from academy

=== Players out ===
- (Ireland) Tom Court to (England) London Irish
- (New Zealand) John Afoa to (England) Gloucester
- (South Africa) Johann Muller retiring
- (Ireland) Niall Annett to (England) Worcester Warriors
- (Ireland) Chris Farrell to (France) Grenoble
- (Ireland) Adam Macklin to (England) Rotherham Titans
- (Ireland) James McKinney to (England) Rotherham Titans
- (Ireland) Paddy McAllister to (France) Aurillac
- (Ireland) Ian Porter to (Ireland) Connacht
- (Ireland) Paddy Wallace retiring
- (Ireland) Chris Cochrane retiring
- (Ireland) David McIlwaine to (England) Yorkshire Carnegie
- (Australia) Sean Doyle to (Australia) Brumbies
- (Ireland) Stephen Ferris retiring

== Zebre ==
=== Players in ===
- (Italy) Giulio Bisegni from (Italy) Lazio Rugby
- (South Africa) Hennie Daniller from (South Africa) Cheetahs
- (South Africa) Andries Ferreira from (South Africa) Cheetahs
- (Italy) Andrea Lovotti from (Italy) Calvisano
- (New Zealand) Kelly Haimona from (Italy) Calvisano
- (Italy) Jacopo Sarto from (Italy) Petrarca Padova
- (Italy) Lorenzo Romano from (Italy) Calvisano
- (Italy) Michele Visentin from (Italy) Calvisano
- (Italy) Valerio Bernabò from (Italy) Benetton Treviso
- (Italy) Edoardo Padovani from (Italy) Mogliano
- (Italy) Mirco Bergamasco from (Italy) Rovigo Delta
- (Italy) Oliviero Fabiani from (Italy) Lazio Rugby

=== Players out ===
- (Ireland) Dave Ryan to (Ireland) Ulster
- (Italy) Salvatore Perugini retired
- (Italy) Paolo Buso to (France) Rugby Olympique de Grasse
- (Italy) Emiliano Caffini to (Italy) Rovigo Delta
- (Italy) Nicola Cattina to (Italy) Benetton Treviso
- (Italy) Filippo Cazzola to (Italy) Fiamme Oro
- (Italy) Roberto Quartaroli to (Italy) Viadana
- (Fiji) Kameli Ratuvou released
- (Italy) Ruggero Trevisan to (Italy) Benetton Treviso
- (Italy) Michael van Vuren to (Italy) Mogliano
- (Italy) Davide Giazzon to (Italy) Benetton Treviso

== See also ==
- List of 2014–15 Premiership Rugby transfers
- List of 2014–15 Top 14 transfers
- List of 2014–15 Super Rugby transfers
- List of 2014–15 RFU Championship transfers
