= Conán O'Donnell =

Irish rugby union player

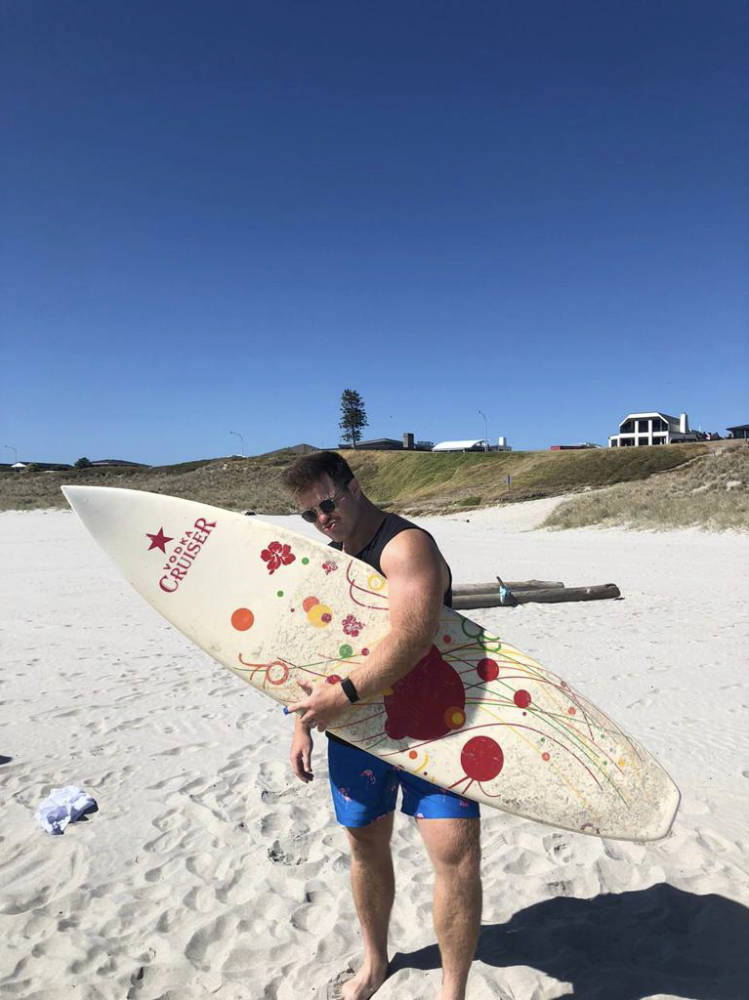
- O'Donnell on the beach in Mount Maunganui
- Born: 23 May 1996 (age 30) Sligo, Ireland
- Height: 1.23 m (4 ft 1/2 in)
- Weight: 171 kg (26.9 st; 377 lb)
- School: Summerhill College
- University: NUI Galway

Rugby union career
- Position: Prop
Amateur team(s)
Years	Team	Apps	(Points)
2014–2017	Sligo		
2014–2017	NUI Galway		
2017–2019	Buccaneers		
- Correct as of 29 July 2022
Senior career
Years	Team	Apps	(Points)
2015–2019	Connacht	21	(0)
2019	Sunwolves	5	(0)
2019–2020	Counties Manukau	19	(10)
2020	Highlanders	2	(0)
2022	Northland	6	(0)
2023	Toronto Arrows	10	(0)
- Correct as of 12 August 2023
International career
Years	Team	Apps	(Points)
2014	Ireland U18	5	(0)
2015–2016	Ireland U20	15	(0)
- Correct as of 29 July 2022

Conán F. O'Donnell (born 23 May 1996) is a rugby union player from Ireland. He plays as a prop.

== Early life ==
O'Donnell was born in Sligo. In his youth he played a number of sports, including Gaelic football and hurling. He first played rugby with Strandhill based club, Sligo RFC. Initially a winger, O'Donnell switched to prop at under 11 level. O'Donnell was a pupil of Summerhill College in Sligo town and played rugby for the school team. He received his third level education in NUI Galway, studying commerce. While there, he played for the university rugby team.

== Professional career ==
=== Connacht ===
O'Donnell was involved with Connacht at under age level throughout his teenage years and joined the team's academy in 2014. During the 2014–15 season, O'Donnell played in the All-Ireland League for Sligo at senior level, while also representing NUI Galway in the Connacht Junior League. After one year in the academy, he was promoted to the academy ahead of the 2015–16 season, becoming the first player from the NUIG team to receive an academy contract.

In O'Donnell's first season in the academy, injuries to first team players led to him making several appearances for the senior team. He made his debut against Cardiff Blues in the 2015–16 Pro12 on 3 October 2015. His European debut came on 14 November 2015, when he was part of the squad that traveled to Siberia to face Enisei-STM in the European Challenge Cup. O'Donnell's first start for the team also came in the Challenge Cup, when the province faced Newcastle Falcons away in the pool stages. He made a total of eight appearances for the senior team in his first academy season, playing four times in the Pro12 and Challenge Cup.

At the beginning of the 2017–18 season, his final year in the academy, O'Donnell joined Buccaneers who had recently been promoted to Division 1A of the All- reland League. O'Donnell played with the Pirates when available, but also missed league matches to play with the Connacht Eagles. In January 2018, he made his return to the senior Connacht team when he featured from the bench against Munster in the Pro14. In March 2018, it was announced that O'Donnell had signed a senior contract with Connacht for the following season.

=== Sunwolves ===
Upon the conclusion of Connacht's 2018–19 season in May 2019, O'Donnell left the province to join Japanese Super Rugby Sunwolves for the remainder of the 2019 season.

=== New Zealand ===
After the conclusion of the 2019 Super Rugby season, O'Donnell moved to New Zealand to join Mitre 10 Cup side Counties Manukau. He played for Crusaders in a pre season friendly ahead of the 2020 Super Rugby season, before joining Highlanders on an eight week contract as injury cover for Jeff Thwaites.

== International ==
O'Donnell has represented Ireland internationally at under age level. He was part of the Ireland schools team in 2014, despite Summerhill College not being a traditional rugby school. O'Donnell made five appearances for the schools team. He went on to play for the Ireland under-20s, featuring in all five of the team's games in the 2015 Under-20 Six Nations. O'Donnell was subsequently named in Nigel Carolan's squad for the 2015 Junior World Cup, and played in four of the side's five matches in the tournament as they finished seventh overall. O'Donnell was young enough to return to the under-20s for a second season and played in the 2016 Six Nations, again featuring in all the games. He missed out on the 2016 Junior World Cup through injury, however.

== Discography ==
O'Donnell has appeared on multiple podcasts around the world. Most recently "The Petey Performance Podcast"
