= Connacht Senior Cup (rugby union) =

The Connacht Senior Cup was a knockout competition for senior rugby union clubs in the Irish province of Connacht, under the auspices of the Connacht Branch IRFU. The Cup has been played for a total of 102 times, with twelve different cubs having won the trophy during that period.

Until 1928, all finals were played at the grounds of the then Galway Grammar School. From 1929 until today, the final is traditionally held at the Galway Sportsground on College Road, Galway.

The winners compete with the other three provincial cup winners for the All-Ireland Cup.

== 1890s ==
- 1895–96 Galway Town beat Queens College, Galway (9–0)
- 1896–97 Queens College, Galway beat Lancashire Fusiliers (9–0)
- 1897–98 Galway Grammar School beat Queens College, Galway (3–0)
- 1898–99 Queens College, Galway beat Galway Town (19–5)

== 1900s ==
- 1899–1902 No competition
- 1902–1903 Queens College, Galway beat Galway Town (13–0, after Replay)
- 1903–1904 Queens College, Galway beat Old Galwegians (3–0)
- 1904–1905 Queens College, Galway beat Old Galwegians (N/K)
- 1905–1906 Galway Town beat Queens College, Galway (3–0)
- 1906–1907 Queens College, Galway beat Galway Town (11–3, after Replay)
- 1907–1908 Queens College, Galway beat Galway Town (14–0)
- 1908–1909 UCG (runners-up not recorded)

== 1910s ==
- 1909–10 UCG beat Old Galwegians (7–3)
- 1910–11 Galway Town (runners-up not recorded)
- 1911–12 UCG (runners-up not recorded)
- 1912–13 Galway Town beat UCG (5–3)
- 1913–14 Sligo beat Galway Town (9–3)
- 1914–19 No competition

== 1920s ==
- 1919–20 No competition
- 1920–21 No competition
- 1921–22 Galway Town beat UCG (6–3)
- 1922–23 UCG beat Sligo (19–0)
- 1923–24 UCG beat Sligo (9–0)
- 1924–25 UCG beat Sligo (15–5)
- 1925–26 Galwegians beat UCG (8–3)
- 1926–27 Galwegians beat UCG (3–0)
- 1927–28 Galwegians beat UCG (22–3)
- 1928–29 Galwegians beat UCG (18–3)

== 1930s ==
- 1929–30 UCG beat Ballina (3–0)
- 1930–31 Loughrea beat Ballina (6–3)
- 1931–32 UCG beat Sligo (10/0)
- 1932–33 Corinthians
- 1933–34 Corinthians
- 1934–35 UCG
- 1935–36 UCG
- 1936–37 UCG
- 1937–38 Galwegians
- 1938–39 UCG

== 1940s ==
- 1939–40 UCG
- 1940–41 Corinthians
- 1941–42 UCG
- 1942–43 Galwegians
- 1943–44 UCG
- 1944–45 UCG
- 1945–46 UCG
- 1946–47 Corinthians
- 1947–48 Ballinasloe beat UCG
- 1948–49 Corinthians beat Galwegians

== 1950s ==
- 1949–50 Ballinasloe beat Galwegians
- 1950–51 Ballina
- 1951–52 Galwegians
- 1952–53 UCG
- 1953–54 Corinthians
- 1954–55 Athlone beat Galwegians
- 1955–56 Galwegians
- 1956–57 Galwegians
- 1957–58 Galwegians beat Westport
- 1958–59 Galwegians

== 1960s ==
- 1959–60 Galwegians
- 1960–61 UCG
- 1961–62 UCG beat Corinthians
- 1962–63 Galwegians beat UCG
- 1963–64 UCG beat Corinthians
- 1964–65 Galwegians beat UCG
- 1965–66 UCG
- 1966–67 UCG beat Westport
- 1967–68 Galwegians
- 1968–69 Galwegians beat UCG

== 1970s ==
- 1969–70 UCG beat Galwegians
- 1970–71 Galwegians
- 1971–72 Corinthians beat UCG
- 1972–73 Galwegians
- 1973–74 UCG beat Athlone
- 1974–75 Galwegians beat Ballinasloe
- 1975–76 Athlone beat Galwegians
- 1976–77 Athlone beat UCG
- 1977–78 Corinthians beat Athlone
- 1978–79 Ballina beat Athlone

== 1980s ==
- 1979–80 Galwegians beat Corinthians
- 1980–81 Galwegians beat Corinthians
- 1981–82 Corinthians beat Sligo
- 1982–83 Galwegians beat Corinthians
- 1983–84 Corinthians beat Athlone
- 1984–85 Corinthians beat Athlone
- 1985–86 Galwegians beat Athlone
- 1986–87 UCG beat Corinthians
- 1987–88 Corinthians beat Athlone
- 1988–89 UCG beat Galwegians

== 1990s ==
- 1989–90 Athlone beat Corinthians
- 1990–91 Athlone beat Galwegians
- 1991–92 Ballinasloe beat Sligo
- 1992–93 Corinthians beat Ballina
- 1993–94 Corinthians beat Connemara
- 1994–95 Buccaneers beat Galwegians
- 1995–96 Galwegians beat Connemara
- 1996–97 Galwegians beat Ballina
- 1997–98 Corinthians beat Galwegians
- 1998–99 Buccaneers beat Galwegians

== 2000s ==
- 1999–00 Buccaneers beat Ballina
- 2000–01 Galwegians beat Buccaneers
- 2001–02 Galwegians beat Buccaneers
- 2002–03 Connemara beat Buccaneers
- 2003–04 Buccaneers beat Connemara
- 2004–05 Galwegians beat Buccaneers 19–6
- 2005–06 Buccaneers beat Monivea
- 2006–07 Buccaneers beat Galwegians 16–12
- 2007–08 Galwegians beat Buccaneers 22–7
- 2008–09 Corinthians beat Connemara 31–9

== 2010s ==
- 2009–10 Galwegians beat Corinthians 19–15
- 2010–11 Corinthians beat Galwegians 25–24
- 2011–12 Galwegians beat Sligo RFC by 36–10
- 2012–13 Galwegians beat Corinthians by 31–15
- 2013–14 Galwegians beat Corinthians by 31–26
- 2014–15 Buccaneers beat Galwegians 28–14
- 2015–16 Galwegians beat Buccaneers 27–10
- 2016–17 Buccaneers beat Corinthians 17–10
- 2017–18 Sligo beat Corinthians 29–27
- 2018–19 Buccaneers beat Corinthians 16–14

== 2020s ==
- 2019–20 Sligo beat Corinthians 19–12
- 2020–21 No competition
- 2021–22 Buccaneers beat Ballina 27–5
- 2022–23 Buccaneers beat Sligo 15–8
- 2023–24 Sligo beat Buccaneers 34–12
- 2024–25 Sligo beat Galwegians by 24–22
- 2025–26 Corinthians beat Galwegians by 12–8

== Performance by club ==
Club	Winners
UCG	34
Galwegians	34
Corinthians	18
Buccaneers	10
Athlone	5
Galway Town	5
Sligo	5
Ballinasloe	3
Ballina	2
Galway Grammar School	1
Connemara	1
Loughrea	1

== See also ==
- Leinster Senior Cup
- Munster Senior Cup
- Ulster Senior Cup
- Connacht Senior League
