= Connacht Senior League =

This is a disambiguation page. The Connacht Senior League may refer to:

- Connacht Senior League (rugby union)
- Connacht Senior League (association football)
