= Steve Cunningham (rugby union) =

Irish rugby union player

Steve Cunningham is President of the Connacht branch of the Irish Rugby Football Union.

Cunningham's rugby career began at UCG where he won three senior cups and three senior leagues. After college was completed, he joined Galway Corinthians and continued to turn out for Connacht. He was involved in some ground-breaking projects around the world, including the development of Thomond Park and The Sportsground. He has also played rugby in Zambia, South Africa and Malawi and gained international caps in both Zambia and Malawi.

He then returned to Ireland claimed a senior league and cup double with Corinthians and began his coaching career with the underage Corinthians, where he managed the development of the game in Connacht, eventually graduated to Director of Rugby and eventually President of the club in 1995.
