= Connacht Senior League (rugby union) =

Record of League winners in Connacht Rugby Senior Club Competition

The Connacht Senior League is a rugby union competition for senior clubs in the Irish province of Connacht. It was first played for in 1925-26.

It has traditionally been ranked second in importance to the Connacht Senior Cup. With the formation of the All-Ireland League it has declined in importance somewhat with the advent of Professional Rugby, and the participation of the regional team Connacht Rugby in competitions such as the United Rugby Championship and European Rugby Champions Cup.

== Performance by Team ==
Club	Titles	Shared Titles	Recent Win
Corinthians	26	2	2026-27
Galwegians	24	2	2014-15
UCG	15	1	1974-75
Buccaneers	13		2022-23
Ballina	5		2020-21
Athlone	4	1	1988-89
Ballinasloe	4		1948-49
Sligo	3		2024-25
Loughrea	1		1926-27

== Past winners ==
=== 1920s ===
- 1925–26 Galwegians
- 1926–27 Loughrea
- 1927–28 Ballinasloe
- 1928–29 Ballina

=== 1930s ===
- 1929–30 Ballina
- 1930–31 UCG
- 1931–32 UCG
- 1932–33 UCG
- 1933–34 Corinthians
- 1934–35 UCG
- 1935–36 Corinthians
- 1936–37 UCG
- 1937–38 UCG
- 1938–39 Corinthians

=== 1940s ===
- 1940 Corinthians
- 1941 Corinthians
- 1942 UCG
- 1943 Corinthians
- 1944 Corinthians
- 1945 Ballinasloe
- 1946 Ballinasloe
- 1947 Galwegians
- 1948 UCG
- 1949 Ballinasloe

=== 1950s ===
- 1950 Corinthians
- 1951 Corinthians/Ballina
- 1952 Corinthians
- 1953 Ballina
- 1954 Corinthians
- 1955 UCG
- 1956 Athlone
- 1957 Galwegians
- 1958 Galwegians
- 1959 Galwegians

=== 1960s ===
- 1960 Galwegians
- 1961 Galwegians
- 1962 UCG beat Galwegians
- 1963 UCG
- 1964 Galwegians
- 1965 Corinthians beat Athlone
- 1966 UCG/Galwegians
- 1967 UCG
- 1968 UCG
- 1969 UCG

=== 1970s ===
- 1970 Galwegians
- 1971 Galwegians beat Ballinasloe
- 1972 Galwegians
- 1973 UCG
- 1974 Corinthians beat Athlone
- 1975 UCG
- 1976 Corinthians beat Athlone
- 1977 Athlone
- 1978 Corinthians
- 1979 Corinthians

=== 1980s ===
- 1980 Corinthians
- 1981 Corinthians
- 1982 Corinthians
- 1983 Corinthians
- 1984 Galwegians beat Athlone
- 1985 Galwegians beat Athlone
- 1986 Corinthians beat Athlone
- 1987 Athlone
- 1988 Corinthians
- 1989 Athlone beat Corinthians

=== 1990s ===
- 1990 Galwegians beat Corinthians
- 1991 Galwegians beat Sligo
- 1992 Galwegians beat Ballina
- 1993 Ballina beat Corinthians
- 1994
- 1995 Corinthians beat Galwegians
- 1996 Galwegians
- 1997
- 1998 Buccaneers
- 1999 Buccaneers

=== 2000s ===
- 2000 Buccaneers
- 2001 Galwegians
- 2002 Galwegians beat Buccaneers
- 2003 Galwegians
- 2004 Buccaneers beat Galwegians
- 2005 Galwegians
- 2006 Buccaneers beat Galwegians
- 2007 Buccaneers beat Galwegians
- 2008 Buccaneers beat Connemara 33-3
- 2009 Galwegians

=== 2010s ===
- 2009–10 Galwegians
- 2010–11 Buccaneers
- 2011–12 Galwegians
- 2012–13 Galwegians
- 2013–14 Galwegians
- 2014–15 Galwegians
- 2015–16 Buccaneers
- 2016–17 Buccaneers
- 2017–18 Buccaneers beat Galwegians
- 2018–19 Buccaneers

=== 2020s ===
- 2019–20 Sligo
- 2020-21 - No competition
- 2021–22 Ballina
- 2022–23 Buccaneers
- 2023–24 Sligo
- 2024–25 Sligo
- 2025-26 Galway Corinthians RFC
- 2026-27 Galway Corinthians RFC

== See also ==
- Leinster Senior League
- Munster Senior League
- Ulster Senior League
- Connacht Senior Cup
