= Ray Hogan =

- Born: 21 November 1981 (age 44) Limerick, Ireland
- Height: 1.93 m (6 ft 4 in)
- Weight: 117 kg (18 st 6 lb)

Rugby union career
- Position: Prop
Amateur team(s)
Years	Team	Apps	(Points)
- Galwegians
Senior career
Years	Team	Apps	(Points)
2003–2007	Connacht Rugby	70	
2007–2009	Bristol		
International career
Years	Team	Apps	(Points)
2005–07	Ireland A	8	(0)

Ray Hogan born 21 November 1981 in Limerick, Ireland is a former rugby union player for Bristol in the Guinness Premiership. After several seasons with Irish province Connacht Hogan signed for Bristol in the summer of 2007.

Hogan played as a prop. He has represented Ireland at Ireland A level on several occasions, participating in the Churchill Cup tournament. He was forced to retire from rugby with a recurrent knee problem in 2009.
