= Mata Fifita =

Tongan rugby union and rugby league footballer

- Born: Mataele Fifita; 18 August 1988 (age 38) Tonga
- Height: 1.88 m (6 ft 2 in)
- Weight: 110 kg (17 st 5 lb)

Rugby union career
- Position(s): Flanker, Centre
Amateur team(s)
Years	Team	Apps	(Points)
- Sligo
–	Buccaneers		
Senior career
Years	Team	Apps	(Points)
2012–2015	Connacht	15	(5)
- Correct as of 31 May 2015
- Rugby league career

Playing information
- Position: Forward
Club
Years	Team	Pld	T	G	FG	P
2015–2021	Galway Tribesmen

Mata Fifita (born 18 August 1988) is a Tongan professional rugby union and rugby league footballer. He has played for Irish provincial side Connacht Rugby in the Pro14. Though his favoured position when he started playing for Connacht was centre, the 2013–14 season saw Fifita converted to a flanker.

== Rugby Union ==
=== Amateur career ===
Living in the west of Ireland, Tonga native Fifita played rugby for Sligo, a local club. He played for the team in the amateur All-Ireland League until the 2011–12 season. In 2012 it was announced that Fifita had signed for professional provincial team Connacht Rugby, on the back of successful AIL and Connacht Senior Cup campaigns.

Having been brought to the attention of the province's head coach Eric Elwood, the Connacht boss approached Fifita to invite him for a three-month trial with the professional squad. Brought into the side as centre cover, the Tongan became the first Sligo senior player to sign a professional contract with Connacht.

=== Connacht ===
Fifita was given his debut by head coach Eric Elwood on 1 September 2012 in the opening game of the 2012–13 Pro12. He started at inside centre alongside Eoin Griffin against Cardiff Blues and played the full 80 minutes. Fifita made his European debut on 13 October 2012, as a replacement against Zebre in the 2012–13 Heineken Cup, and made another replacement appearance in the competition, coming on against Harlequins. He made a total of nine league appearances for the season, starting in three of those games.

Eric Elwood left his post as Connacht coach at the end of the 2012–13 season and was replaced by Pat Lam. The new coach felt that Fifita would be of most use to the team as a flanker, rather than a centre, and began to use the Tongan as a back row forward for the 2013–14 season. Fifita played three games in the 2013–14 Pro12 under Lam, and also made an appearance from the replacement bench against Zebre in the 2013–14 Heineken Cup, scored his first try for Connacht against the Italian side.

Fifita's contract was extended for another season in April 2014, but he failed to make an appearance for the first team, not playing in either the 2014–15 Pro12 or Rugby Challenge Cup. Fifita featured for the Connacht Eagles, the province's second tier side, in the 2014–15 British and Irish Cup. At the end of his third season with Connacht, Fifita's contract was not renewed and he was allowed to leave the squad.

== Rugby League ==
After leaving Connacht, Fifita changed codes and began playing rugby league. He played for the Galway Tribesmen, a rugby league side based in the same city as Connacht. In his first season with the side, they topped the Munster League and qualified for the final.
