= Brendan Guerin =

Irish rugby union player

- Full name: Brendan Noel Guerin
- Born: 2 January 1930 Cappoquin, County Waterford, Ireland
- Died: 2021 (aged 91)
- School: Castleknock College
- Occupation: Banker

Rugby union career
- Position: Lock
International career
Years	Team	Apps	(Points)
1956	Ireland	1	(0)

Brendan Noel Guerin (2 January 1930 — March 2021) was an Irish international rugby union player.

Originally from County Waterford, Guerin was schooled in Dublin, attending Castleknock College. He won a Leinster Schools Senior Cup title during his time at Castleknock.

Guerin played in the second row of a strong Galwegians side which dominated the late 1950s. A regular Connacht representative, Guerin and Charlie Lydon share the distinction of being the province's first forwards to gain an Ireland cap, when they appeared against Scotland at Lansdowne Road in 1956.

A banker, Guerin remained involved in rugby as an administrator and served as Galwegians president in 1973-74.

Guerin's two sons, Enda and Shane, both played rugby for Connacht.

== See also ==
- List of Ireland national rugby union players
