= Tiernan O'Halloran =

Irish rugby union player

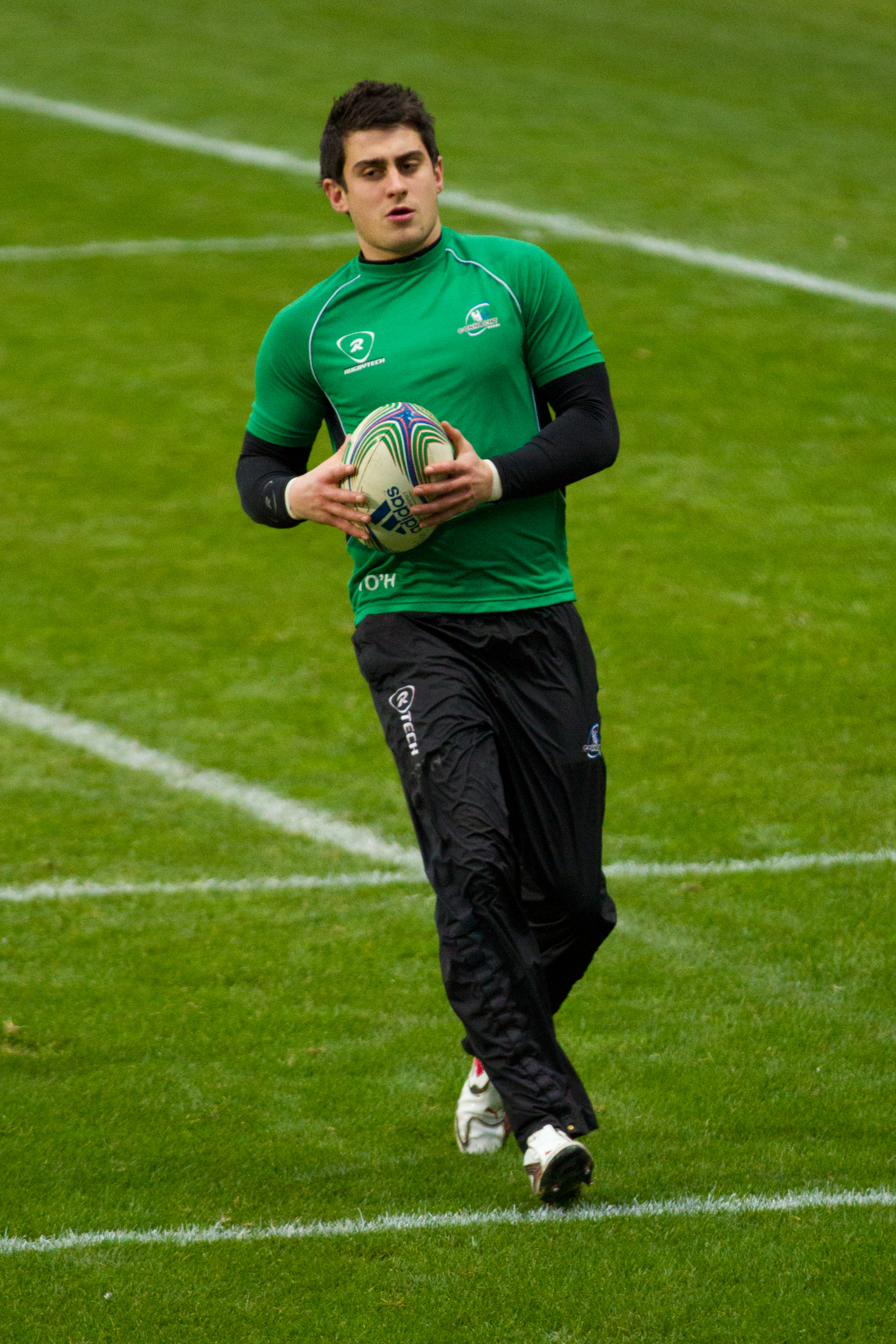
- O'Halloran warming up before a 2011–12 Heineken Cup game against Toulouse.
- Born: Tiernan Davan O'Halloran; 26 February 1991 (age 35) Clifden, County Galway, Ireland
- Height: 1.88 m (6 ft 2 in)
- Weight: 98 kg (15 st 6 lb; 216 lb)
- School: Garbally College; Cistercian College

Rugby union career
- Position(s): Fullback, Wing
- Current team: Connacht
Amateur team(s)
Years	Team	Apps	(Points)
- Connemara
–	Galwegians		
Senior career
Years	Team	Apps	(Points)
2009–2024	Connacht	236	(249)
- Correct as of 2 May 2024
International career
Years	Team	Apps	(Points)
2010–2011	Ireland U20	8	(5)
2013–	Emerging Ireland	3	(5)
2016–2017	Ireland	6	(10)
- Correct as of 27 June 2017

Tiernan O'Halloran (Irish name: Tiernan Ó hAllaráin; born 26 February 1991) is a former professional rugby union player from Ireland. He primarily played as a fullback or on the wing. O'Halloran most recently played for Irish provincial side Connacht in the Pro14, but retired in 2024.

== Early life ==
O'Halloran grew up in Clifden. O'Halloran played rugby with Connemara at a young age. He attended Garbally College in Ballinasloe, playing for the side in the Connacht Junior Schools Cup, scoring a try as they beat Coláiste Iognáid in the final in 2005. O'Halloran later transferred to Cistercian College in Roscrea and played for them in the Leinster Senior Schools Cup.

In addition to rugby, O'Halloran played Gaelic football growing up. He played with Clifden at club level and was on the Galway minor panel for two years.

== Rugby career ==
=== Connacht ===
O'Halloran was involved with the Connacht youth set up from a young age, and trained with the academy squad at just 16 years old. He made his debut against Olympus Madrid in the 2009–10 Challenge Cup, scoring a try 30 minutes into the game. O'Halloran made his league debut in the same season, starting against Scarlets in a 2009–10 Celtic League match on 25 April 2010. The following season, while still in the academy, O'Halloran made three replacement appearances in the 2010–11 Celtic League, but didn't feature in the Challenge Cup.

After graduating from the Connacht academy, O'Halloran was signed on a development contract for the 2011–12 season. That season saw Connacht qualify for the Heineken Cup, Europe's premier club competition, for the first time. On 11 November 2011, O'Halloran scored Connacht's first ever try in the competition against Harlequins in the opening round. He also featured for Connacht in the 36–10 defeat to Toulouse in and the 23–19 loss against Gloucester, scoring another try against Gloucester. O'Halloran then played in the 24–3 loss against Toulouse but played in the province's first ever Heineken Cup win when Connacht beat Harlequins 9–8. In the 2011–12 Pro12 O'Halloran scored tries in both games against the Cardiff Blues along with tries Leinster and Glasgow Warriors. In Round 20 of matches, O'Halloran scored a try in a 26–21 victory over Ulster to take his tally of tries to five in the Pro12 and seven in all competitions.

In April 2024, O’Halloran announced that he would retire from professional rugby at the end of the 2023–24 season, bringing to an end a 15-year career all with his home province of Connacht. In addition to his 48 tries, the Connemara native kicked 3 conversions (1 v Zebre 3/3/2017; 2 v Oyonnax 20/1/2018) and a drop goal (v Cardiff 12/2/2017) during his career.

=== International ===
O'Halloran has represented Ireland internationally at under-age level. He played for both Ireland schools and the Ireland under-20s. During the 2011–12 season, he was called up by Declan Kidney to train with the senior team. O'Halloran received his first full international cap against South Africa on 18 June 2016. He played his last match for Ireland in 2017 and finished with 6 caps, winning four matches and losing two.

== Personal life ==
He is the son of Aidan O'Halloran, who was a member of the All-Ireland winning Offaly football team in 1982. In 2012, Aidan O'Halloran became President of the Connacht Branch of the IRFU while his son was playing for the senior team.
