= Tony O'Sullivan (rugby union) =

Irish rugby union player

- Full name: Patrick Joseph Antony O'Sullivan
- Born: 2 June 1933 Galway, Ireland
- Died: 1 September 2007 (aged 74) Raheny, Dublin, Ireland
- School: St Joseph's College, Garbally

Rugby union career
- Position: No. 8
International career
Years	Team	Apps	(Points)
1957–63	Ireland	15	(3)

Patrick Joseph Antony O'Sullivan (2 June 1933 — 1 September 2007) was an Irish international rugby union player.

O'Sullivan was born in Galway and attended St Joseph's College, Garbally.

A forward, O'Sullivan played in a Galwegians side that dominated Connacht rugby. He made 35 provincial appearances for Connacht and was capped 15 times by Ireland between 1957 and 1963.

O'Sullivan had a pork victualling shop on Dominick Street in Galway and later immigrated to Zimbabwe to run a meat processing business. He died at his home in Raheny, Dublin, in 2007 at the age of 74.

== See also ==
- List of Ireland national rugby union players
