= Dickie Roche =

Irish rugby union player

- Full name: Richard Edwin Roche
- Born: 22 February 1930 Woodford, County Galway, Ireland
- Died: 20 February 2017 (aged 86) Cork, Ireland
- School: Garbally College
- University: University of Galway
- Occupation: Engineer

Rugby union career
- Position: Wing
International career
Years	Team	Apps	(Points)
1955–57	Ireland	4	(0)

Richard Edwin Roche (22 February 1930 – 20 February 2017) was an Irish international rugby union player.

Roche was born in Woodford, County Galway, and educated at Garbally College.

A winger, Roche played his rugby with the University of Galway, Dolphin, Galwegians and Connacht, while gaining four Ireland caps. He featured twice for Ireland in both the 1955 and 1957 Five Nations campaigns, becoming the first player to be capped while playing for a Connacht club.

Roche was an engineer and builder by trade.

== See also ==
- List of Ireland national rugby union players
