= David Moore (rugby union) =

Dave Moore
- Born: David Moore; 3 March 1986 (age 40) Dublin, Ireland
- Height: 1.9 m (6 ft 3 in)
- Weight: 140 kg (22 st)

Rugby union career
- Position: Scrum-half
Senior career
Years	Team	Apps	(Points)
2010-2011	Harlequins	6	(0)
2011-2013	Connacht	10	(0)
- Correct as of 3 November 2012

David Moore (born 3 March 1986 in Dublin) is a former rugby union player for Connacht Rugby. His favored position was scrum half. (dead Link, here is the archived web site as of 25 August 2016)
