= Galway Corinthians RFC =

Irish rugby union club, based in Galway

(Republic of Ireland) Galway Corinthians RFC
- Full name: Galway Corinthians Rugby Football Club
- Union: (Ireland) IRFU
- Branch: Connacht
- Nickname: CRFC Corinthians
- Founded: 1932; 94 years ago
- Ground(s): Corinthian Park, Galway (Capacity: 4,500)
- Chairman: Pearce Flannery
- President: Brian Murphy
- Coach: Michael Harding
- Captain: Aaron Broderick
- League: All-Ireland League, Division 2A
- 2024–25: 5th
Team kit

Official website
- galwaycorinthians.com

Galway Corinthians Rugby Football Club is a rugby club in Galway, Ireland and the largest rugby union club in the province of Connacht. The club was founded in 1932 and plays in Division 2A of the Irish domestic club competition the All-Ireland League. The club's home ground is at Corinthian Park, Cloonacauneen, County Galway.

== Early history ==
On 13 September 1932, a brief report in the pages of the Connacht Sentinel announced the formation of a new rugby club in Galway. Its membership was drawn largely from Galway's working-class inner city and was composed in the main of students and players of St Joseph's Patrician College (The Bish) and the Galway Grammar School. The following evening the club held its first meeting in the Mechanic's Institute in Middle Street at 8 pm and, from that meeting, its first Senior Committee was elected.

=== Senior team ===
- 1943 Jack Griffin
- 1960s Ken Armstrong (Rugby)
- 1970s Ken Houston
- 1988-1993 Noel Mannion
- 2004-2006 Johnny O'Connor
- 2014 Kieran Marmion
- 2016–present Finlay Bealham
- 2021–present Mack Hansen

=== U20s ===
- Fiachna Barrett
- Billy Bohan
- Eoin de Buitléar
- Aaron Conneely
- John Devine
- Matthew Devine
- Sean Naughton
- Max Flynn
- Cathal Forde
- Eoin Griffin
- Sean Masterson
- Kieran Marmion
- Oran McNulty
- Cathal O'Flaherty
- David Panter
- Dylan Tierney-Martin
- Sean Walsh
- Diarmuid O'Connell
- Charlie Keane

=== Barbarians ===
Several Corinthians players have represented the famous invitational side Barbarians. The most recent to play while in Corinthians colours is Cathal Forde in a 20 November 2022 match against Bath at The Rec which the Baa-Baa's won 30–31.

==== Representatives ====
- 1980s - Noel Mannion
- 2006 - Johnny O'Connor
- 2022 - Cathal Forde

==== British & Irish Lions ====
- 2025 to AU- Finlay Bealham (4 Apps, 1 Tests)

== Honours ==
- Connacht Senior Cup - 17 wins
- Connacht Senior League - 26 wins

Last Updated: 24-09-2025
