= Gavin Duffy (sportsman) =

Ireland international rugby union & Gaelic football player

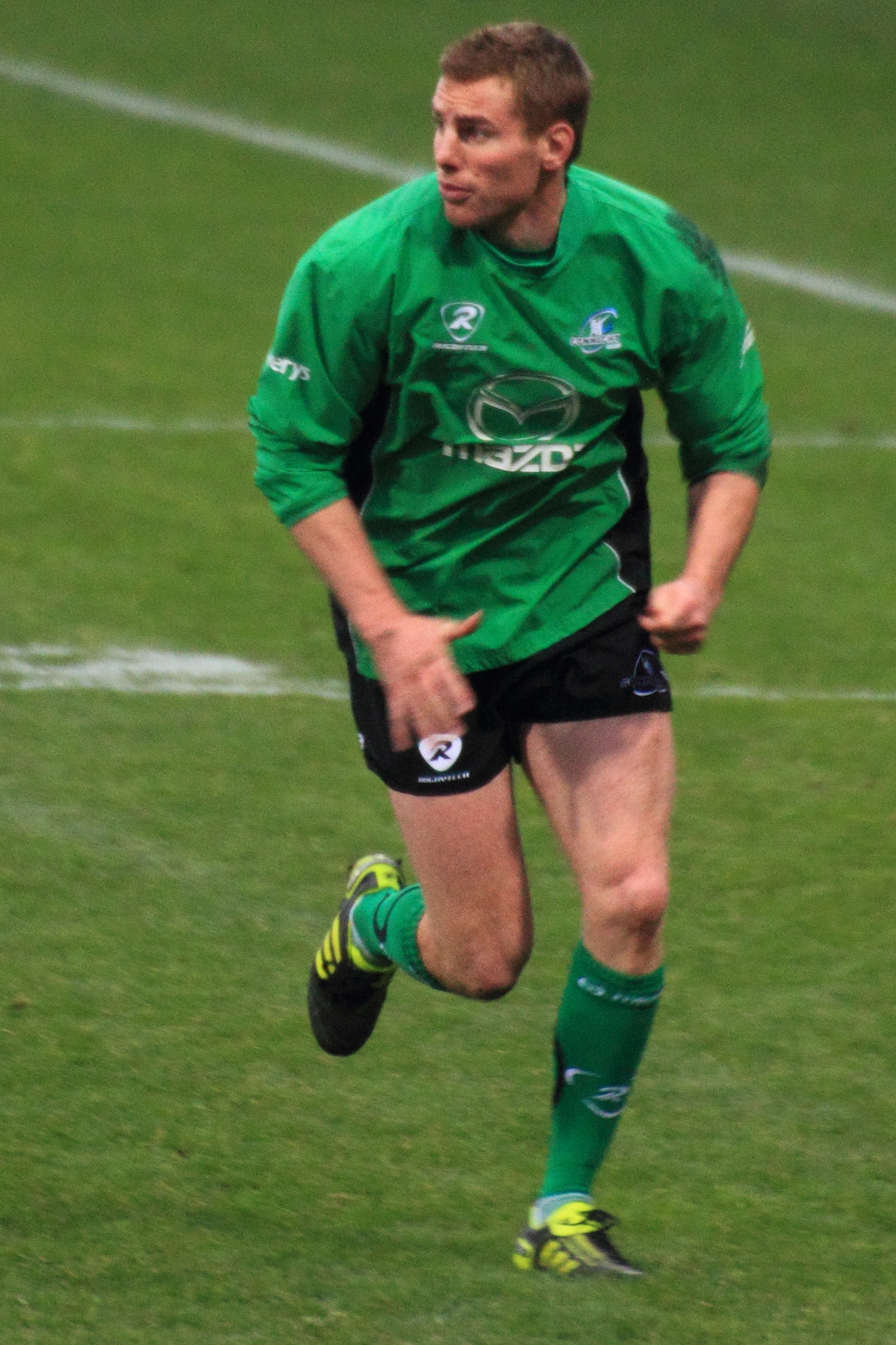
- Duffy warming up for Connacht prior to a 2011–12 Heineken Cup group stage match versus Toulouse
- Full name: Gavin William Duffy
- Born: 18 September 1981 (age 45) Ballina, Ireland
- Height: 1.88 m (6 ft 2 in)
- School: Cistercian College
- University: NUI Galway

Rugby union career
- Position: Fullback
Youth career
- Ballina
Amateur team(s)
Years	Team	Apps	(Points)
- NUI Galway
- Galwegians
Senior career
Years	Team	Apps	(Points)
2001–2003	Connacht	20	(8)
2003–2006	Harlequins	110	(40)
2006–2014	Connacht	175	(78)
2001–2014	Total	284	(126)
- Correct as of 31 May 2014
International career
Years	Team	Apps	(Points)
2004–2009	Ireland	10	(18)
2006–2012	Ireland Wolfhounds	11	(5)
- Correct as of 28 January 2012
National sevens team
Years	Team		Comps
2000	Ireland		1

Gavin Duffy
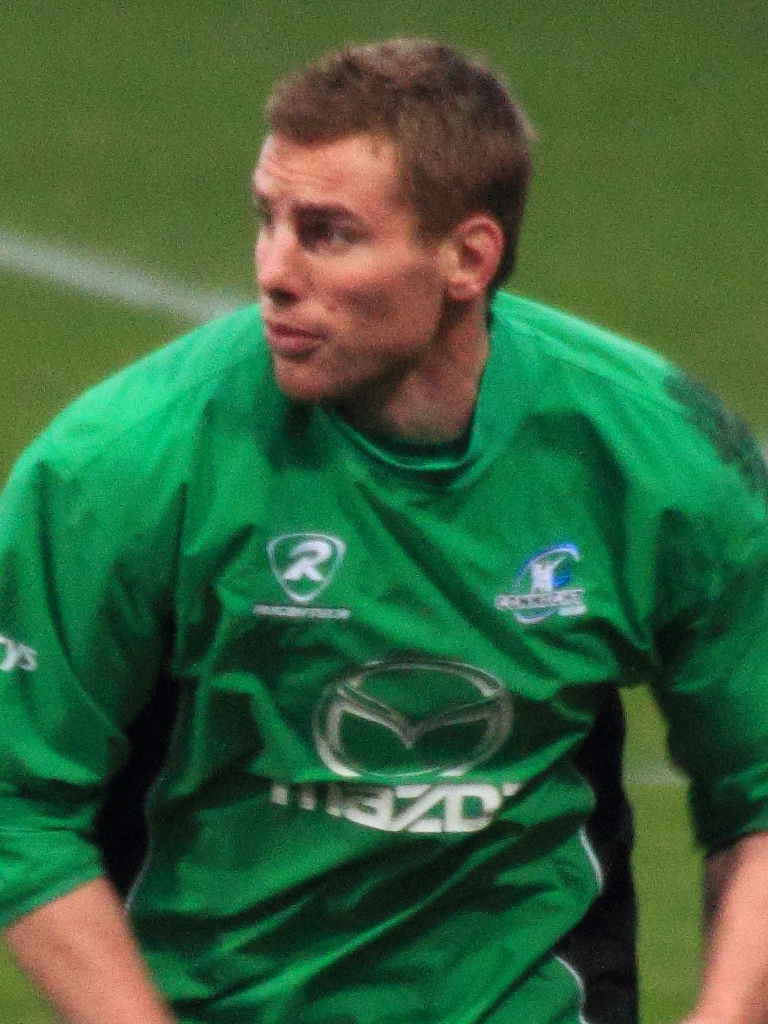
- Gavin Duffy in 2012 at Toulouse during Stade toulousain - Connacht Rugby

Personal information
- Native name: Gabhán Ó Dubhthaigh (Irish)
- Height: 6 ft 2 in (188 cm)

Sport
- Position: Corner Back
Club
- Years: Club
- 2014–: Salthill–Knocknacarra
Inter-county
Years	County	Apps (scores)
2014–2015	Mayo	0 (0)

Gavin Duffy (born 18 September 1981) is an Irish sportsman. Duffy is a former international rugby union footballer who primarily played at full back. He last played professionally for Irish provincial side Connacht Rugby, in the Pro12, and represented Ireland at full international level.

Duffy also plays Gaelic football, and was previously part of the wider Mayo county team. He had previously represented the county at under-age level.

== Early life ==
Educated at Cistercian College, Roscrea and NUI Galway (where he studied commerce), he first played for Ireland at Schools level in 1998, 99 and 2000 (captain of an unbeaten tour of Australia) and at Under-21 level before he was brought into their senior side during the 2000–01 season. He is also a graduate of the sports college, Setanta College with a degree in Strength and Conditioning.

== Rugby career ==
=== Early career ===
Duffy played for the amateur clubs Ballina RFC, his hometown's side and Galway city-based Galwegians RFC, before playing for his native province of Connacht. Duffy first played Celtic League rugby with Connacht in 2001, and played seven times in the 2001–02 Celtic League and six times in the 2001–02 European Challenge Cup, scoring one try in the league. In the following season, after an early season injury he recovered to play twice in the league and five times in the Challenge. During his time at Connacht, Duffy attracted the attention of larger sides. He declined an offer from Munster, as they had already signed the former All Black, Christian Cullen, who played the same positions as Duffy.

=== Move to Premiership ===
Duffy moved to the English club Harlequins from Connacht in the summer of 2003. Having joined Harlequins, Duffy made his league debut for the Premiership side in a game against Rotherham Titans on 20 September 2003. He was part of the team that won the 2003–04 European Challenge Cup. Duffy scored two tries in the 1st Round rout of El Salvador. Harlequins went on to eventually face Connacht, beating Duffy's former team in the semi-finals over two legs. Duffy himself started at fullback in both the first and second matches. He also started in the final, scoring a crucial try in a single-point victory over AS Montferrand. The club was relegated in the 2005–05 season, Duffy stayed with the team as they won the 2005–06 National Division One, England's second-tier league. Duffy remained with Harlequins until 2006. During his time there, he earned 110 caps, making 92 starts and 18 replacement appearances, as well as scoring 21 tries.

=== Return to Connacht ===
Duffy rejoined Connacht in late 2006, going on to become a mainstay of the Connacht team. He was named as captain for the 2011–12 season, replacing his Galwegians clubmate and fellow Ireland cap-holder John Muldoon in the role. In the 2011–12 Heineken Cup Duffy scored a try against former club Harlequins, as well as against Gloucester. He scored 4 tries for Connacht in the Pro 12, starting all 22 of their games, as well as all six of their Heineken Cup matches.

For the 2013–14 Pro 12 and Heineken Cup, Duffy started out the season sharing the captaincy with both Muldoon and Connacht's longest serving player, Michael Swift. However, after a poor run of form culminating in a 43–10 defeat against Edinburgh, Craig Clarke, a New Zealand native and the former captain of the Chiefs, was made Connacht's team captain.

It was announced in April 2014 that Duffy was one of a number of senior Connacht players that would not be having their contracts renewed and that he would leave the province at the end of the season. Duffy was one of a number of experienced players released, including the former Scotland international Dan Parks, and fellow centurion Frank Murphy.

=== International career ===
Duffy has played for the Ireland sevens team. He played in the Dubai Sevens in 2000.

In November 2001, he won his first Ireland A cap against New Zealand at Ravenhill and his performances for Harlequins in the 2003–04 European Challenge Cup saw him called into the senior Ireland squad for the first time for the 2004 tour to South Africa. He won his first cap on that trip when coming on as a replacement during the second test. In February 2005, he won his second cap when again coming on as a replacement against Scotland, marking the occasion by scoring his first international try. He was selected to play at outside centre for Ireland in both summer Tests in Japan in 2005, scoring two tries in the second Test.

After playing both tests against Argentina in Argentina (the first at full-back and the second at inside centre) in June 2007 and despite getting injured in a World Cup warm up game against Scotland, Duffy was the only Connacht player included in the Ireland squad for the 2007 Rugby World Cup.He toured New Zealand and Australia in 2008 and won caps against Canada and USA in 2009. He again toured New Zealand in 2010 and played at out-side centre against the New Zealand Māori. He was called up to the 2011 Six Nations Championship squad for the game against Italy, and was part of the wider squad ahead of the 2011 World Cup. Duffy was a late call up for the tour of New Zealand in 2012.

== Gaelic football ==
Duffy played Gaelic football at a young age before becoming a professional rugby union player. He represented his native county of Mayo at under-age level. Duffy played in the final of the 1999 All-Ireland Minor Football Championship, which the team lost 1–14 to 0–14 against Down. The team included many players who went on to become regulars in the senior inter-county Mayo squad.

Following the end of his career with Connacht, Duffy expressed an interest in taking up Gaelic football again. Having lived in Galway during his career with the province, Duffy took up football with the local team Salthill–Knocknacarra, He was then called up to train with Mayo's senior team by manager James Horan. Duffy was reportedly a 'stand-out performer' in training and was added to the panel. Horan later said that although Duffy's skill-set was "a bit off where it needed to be", the management team were "very excited about where he is and how it's progressing".

Duffy trained with the county squad for the remainder of the season, but did not feature in the 2014 Championship before Mayo were knocked out by Kerry in a semi-final replay. In January 2015, Duffy was named in the starting team for Mayo in a competitive game for the first time. He was named in midfield alongside Barry Moran, for the FBD League fixture against IT Sligo.
