= Charlie Lydon =

Irish rugby union player

- Full name: Charles Thomas John Lydon
- Born: 31 August 1931
- Died: 16 February 2013 (aged 81)
- University: University College Dublin
- Occupation: Veterinary surgeon

Rugby union career
- Position: Wing-forward
International career
Years	Team	Apps	(Points)
1956	Ireland	1	(0)

Charles Thomas John Lydon (31 August 1931 — 16 February 2013) was an Irish international rugby union player.

Hailing from Lecanvey in County Mayo, Lydon attended Lecanvey National School and Roscrea College.

Lydon was involved in several sports during his youth. He set a Leinster Schools record for 400 yards hurdles and contested an All-Ireland Minor Football Championship final with Mayo GAA. As a goalkeeper, Lydon played soccer for Shamrock Rovers in the League of Ireland.

In 1956, Lydon gained his solitary cap for the Ireland national rugby union team as a wing-forward against Scotland at Lansdowne Road during the 1956 Five Nations. He became the first Connacht forward to be capped for Ireland (along with another new cap Brendan Guerin) and was selected having helped the province claim a share of the Interprovincial Championship for the first time.

Lydon had a veterinary practice in Westport, County Mayo.

== See also ==
- List of Ireland national rugby union players
