= Aaron Conneely =

- Born: Aaron Conneely; 23 January 1992 (age 34) Galway, Ireland
- Height: 1.88 m (6 ft 2 in)
- Weight: 98 kg (15 st 6 lb)
- School: Coláiste Iognáid
- University: NUI Galway NCAD

Rugby union career
- Position: Flanker
Amateur team(s)
Years	Team	Apps	(Points)
- Corinthians
–	Lansdowne		
Senior career
Years	Team	Apps	(Points)
2012–2014	Connacht	0	(0)
- Correct as of 23 February 2014
International career
Years	Team	Apps	(Points)
2011-2012	Ireland U20	15	(5)
- Correct as of 22 June 2012

Aaron Conneely (born 23 January 1992) is a rugby union player from Ireland. He primarily plays as a flanker. He most recently played professionally for Irish provincial team Connacht Rugby in the Pro12.

Conneely, who plays his club rugby for the Galway city team Corinthians, came through the Connacht academy and was part of the Connacht Under-20 side that took the Grand Slam in the Interprovincial Championship during the 2011–12 season. He joined the senior side ahead of the 2013–14 season, signing a development contract. He had already featured for the province's second-tier side, the Connacht Eagles, in the semi-professional British and Irish Cup.

In April 2014, it was announced that Conneely's contract had not been renewed and he would leave the province at the end of the 2013–14 season.

Conneely has represented Ireland at a number of levels internationally, including playing for the Ireland Under-20 team. He was part of Under-20 squad for the IRB Junior World Championship in both the 2011 and 2012 tournaments.
