= Paul O'Donohoe =

Irish rugby union player (born 1987)

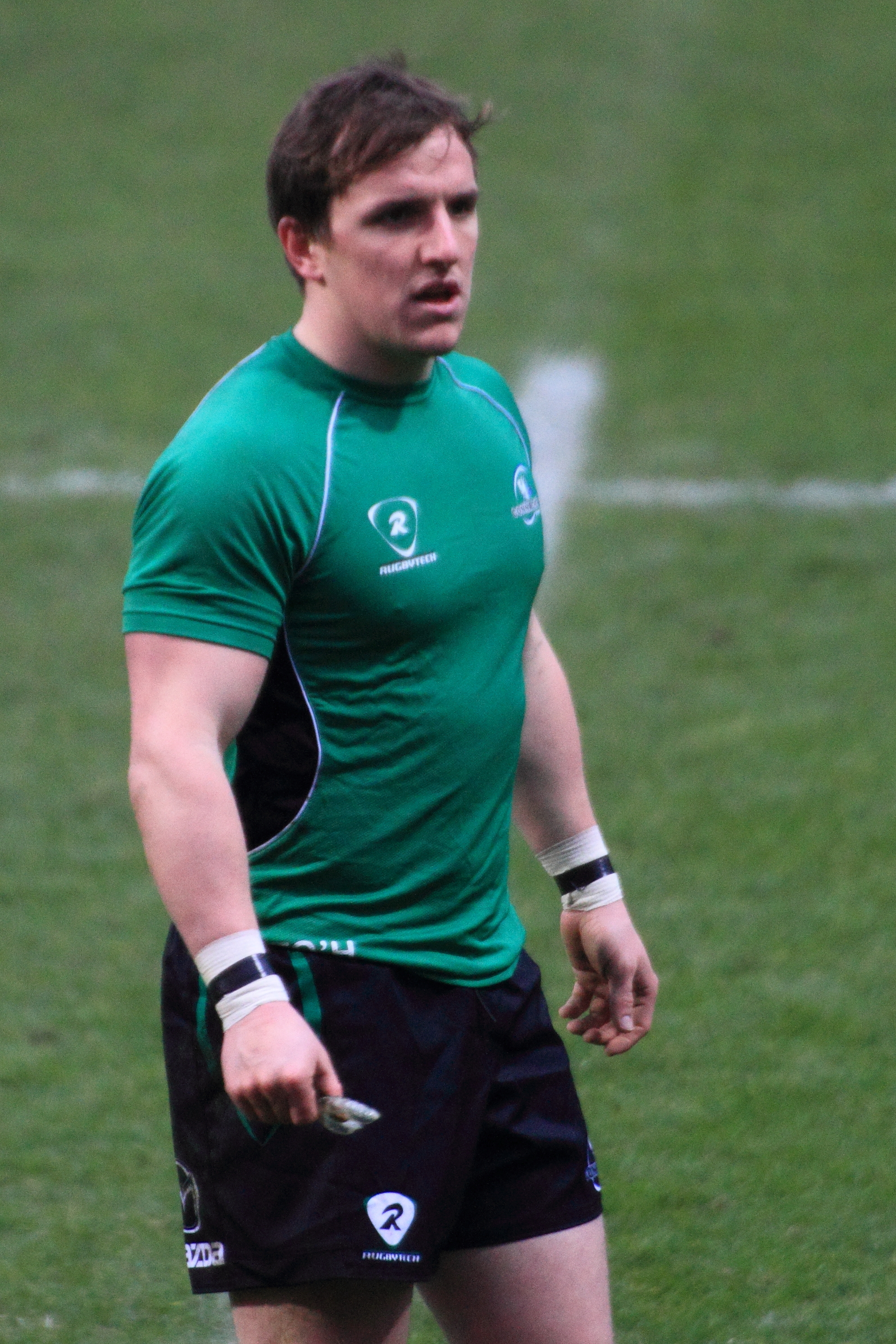
- Born: Paul O'Donohoe; 27 August 1987 (age 39) Dublin, Ireland
- Height: 1.78 m (5 ft 10 in)
- Weight: 92 kg (14.5 st)
- School: Belvedere College
- University: University College Dublin

Rugby union career
- Position: Scrum-half
Amateur team(s)
Years	Team	Apps	(Points)
- Clontarf
Senior career
Years	Team	Apps	(Points)
2008–2011	Leinster	16	(0)
2011-2014	Connacht	54	(5)
- Correct as of 5 May 2014
International career
Years	Team	Apps	(Points)
2007	Ireland U20	5	(5)
- Correct as of 16 March 2007

Paul O'Donohoe (born 27 August 1987) is a professional rugby union player from Ireland. He primarily plays at scrum half. O'Donohoe last played professionally for Irish provincial side Connacht, and before that played in his native province of Leinster. O'Donohoe has also represented the Ireland U-20's team.

== Early career ==
O'Donohoe played for Belvedere College and Clontarf at an under-age level, and he also represented the Leinster Schools team 8 times.

O'Donohoe played for Clontarf RFC from a young age, and won the Leinster League Cup with Clontarf and was a runner-up with the side in the 2009 AIB League.

== Senior professional career ==
=== Leinster ===
O'Donohoe joined Leinster as an academy player, and played 1 game for the Leinster U-19 'A' team. O'Donohoe then joined the Leinster U-20 team, where he played 4 games before making the Leinster 'A' team where he earned 15 caps.

O'Donohoe signed a professional contract with Leinster at the beginning of the 2008–09 season, joining the team's senior ranks. O'Donohoe made his senior debut against Scarlets on 21 February 2009. His second game came against Ospreys on 6 March.

O'Donohoe left Leinster at the end of the 2010–11 season, having made a total of 16 senior appearances for the side.

=== Connacht ===
In April 2011 it was announced that O'Donohoe had signed for another Irish province, agreeing to join Connacht for the 2011–12 season, in the process linking up with his former Ireland Under-20 coach Eric Elwood, who was now in charge of the western province. This was Connacht's first season in the Heineken Cup, and over the course of the season O'Donohoe vied with Connacht's other scrum-half, Frank Murphy, for the starting position. O'Donohoe made his debut for Connacht in the 2011–12 Pro12 on 10 September 2011, coming on from the bench against Scarlets, the same team that he had played against on his Leinster debut. O'Donohoe played his first European match for Connacht in the 2011–12 Heineken Cup, starting against English side Harlequins. In O'Donohoe's first season he made a total of 16 appearances in the Pro12, five of these coming as starts, and also started in four of Connacht's six Heineken Cup matches, coming off the bench in the other two.

At the start of the following season, both O'Donohoe and Murphy were absent due to injury, meaning Connacht academy scrum-half Kieran Marmion stepped into the role. Marmion played impressively in the absence of the two senior players and went on to start every competitive game the province played that season. O'Donohoe made 12 appearances in the 2012–13 Pro12, all of them coming from the bench, along with four substitute appearances in the 2012–13 Heineken Cup.

In the following season, Marmion continued to be first choice at scrum-half. O'Donohoe made his first start in over a year on 4 October 2013, in a 2013–14 Pro12 match against Benetton Treviso. He also came off the bench in four of Connacht's six 2013–14 Heineken Cup matches. O'Donohoe earned his 50th cap for Connacht at senior level on 4 January 2014, in a Pro12 match against his former side Leinster.

It was announced in April 2014 that O'Donohoe was among a number of Connacht players to not have their contracts renewed. He will depart the province at the end of the 2013–14 season, along with a number of other players, including Murphy, former Connacht captain Gavin Duffy and experienced fly-half Dan Parks.

== International career ==
O'Donohoe represented Ireland at under-age international level. O'Donohoe was part of Ireland's 'Grand Slam' winning team in the 2007 Six Nations Under 20s Championship. He played in all five games for Ireland. The side was coached by O'Donohoe's future coach at Connacht, Eric Elwood.

== Honours ==
=== Leinster ===
- Heineken Cup: 2008–09

=== Ireland ===
- U-20 6 Nations: 2007

=== Clontarf RFC ===
- Leinster League Cup: 2007–08
- AIB League: (Runners-up) 2009
