= Seán Henry (rugby union) =

- Born: 16 December 1987 (age 38) Sligo, Ireland
- Height: 1.83 m (6 ft 0 in)
- Weight: 105 kg (16.5 st; 231 lb)
- School: St. Attracta's Community School
- University: University of Limerick

Rugby union career
- Position: Hooker
Amateur team(s)
| Years | Team | Apps | (Points) |
- UL Bohemians
Senior career
| Years | Team | Apps | (Points) |
| 2010–2013 | Munster | 7 | (0) |
| 2013–2015 | Connacht | 14 | (0) |
- Correct as of 19 January 2014

Seán Henry (born 16 December 1987) is a former Irish rugby union player. He played as a hooker. Whilst at Munster, Henry played his club rugby with UL Bohemians.

== Connacht ==
Being from Sligo, Henry's native province was Connacht, and he represented the team at Under-18, Under-19 and Under-20 level, before switching to Munster.

== Munster ==
Henry made his debut against Glasgow in September 2010.

Henry started at Hooker for Munster A in the 2009–10 British and Irish Cup Final, which Cornish Pirates won 23–14, but was on the winning side when Munster A beat Cross Keys 31–12 to win the 2011–12 British and Irish Cup. After one year in the Munster Academy, he secured a development contract for the 2011/12 season.

== Return to Connacht ==
It was announced on 22 January 2013 that Henry would return to his native province, Connacht, at the end of the 2012–13 season. Henry made his first Pro 12 appearance for Connacht on 7 September 2013, coming on as a second-half substitute for Jason Harris-Wright, in the first match of the 2013–14 season at home to Zebre. He made his Heineken Cup debut on 11 October 2013, starting against Saracens in the first pool match of the 2013–14 season. Henry had to retire at the end of the 2015 season due to injury.
