= Brian Murphy (rugby union) =

Irish rugby union player

- Born: Brian Murphy; 16 December 1985 (age 40) Galway, Ireland
- Height: 1.83 m (6 ft 0 in)
- Weight: 89 kg (14.0 st)

Rugby union career
- Position: Centre
Amateur team(s)
Years	Team	Apps	(Points)
- Corrib RFC
–	Galwegians		
Senior career
Years	Team	Apps	(Points)
2012–2014	Connacht	8	(0)
- Correct as of 6 October 2013

Brian Murphy (born 16 December 1985) is a rugby union player from Ireland. He primarily plays as a centre. Murphy last played professionally for Irish provincial side Connacht Rugby in the Pro12.

Murphy grew up in County Mayo and played rugby for Corrib RFC. He moved from Corrib to Galwegians to play in the All-Ireland League. Murphy's form with Galwegians earned him a development contract with Connacht ahead of the 2012–13 season. Before his first season with the province began Murphy suffered an injury, tearing cartilage in his knee.

Murphy made his Connacht senior team debut on 22 February 2013, starting at inside centre against Welsh side Cardiff Blues in the 2012–13 Pro12, and played the full 80 minutes as Connacht came out winners by a score of 22–26. Before making his debut, Murphy had featured for the provinces's second tier developmental side, the Connacht Eagles, in the semi-professional British and Irish Cup. Murphy went on to make another six appearances for the senior side in the league campaign, all of these coming as starts.

Murphy made only one senior appearance for Connacht the following season, with that coming in the 2013–14 Pro12 against Benetton Treviso. In April 2014, it was announced that Murphy was one of a number of plays who would not have their contracts renewed, and he would leave the province at the end of the season.
