= Jack Griffin =

American businessman

Jack Griffin is Operating Chairman, Magazines, for Dotdash Meredith. Dotdash Meredith, a subsidiary of IAC (NASDAQ), is the largest digital and print publisher in the United States with a vast portfolio of major brands including People, Real Simple, Better Homes & Gardens, and Travel & Leisure. Jack consulted to IAC on its 2021 acquisition of Meredith Corporation, where Jack spent 12 years as a senior executive in magazine publishing, marketing services, and television broadcasting.

== Career ==
Griffin graduated from Boston College and the Yale School of Management. Griffin started his career as a reporter and editor for a family owned trade newspaper publisher.

Dennis Publishing

Prior to joining Dotdash Meredith, Jack was Chairman of Dennis Publishing, a London-based publisher of popular magazines in the UK and US, including The Week and Kiplinger. In this capacity, Jack worked for Exponent Private Equity (London) from 2018–2021 and led the successful sale process of Dennis to Future PLC, the largest publisher in the United Kingdom.

Meredith Corporation

Griffin spent a 12 years at Meredith Corporation, publisher of magazines including Better Homes and Gardens, Ladies' Home Journal and Family Circle. As President of its National Media Group since 2004, he led a transformation of Meredith into a digitally enabled, diversified media and marketing company. From its print roots, Meredith became a major provider of marketing services through Meredith Integrated Marketing, of which Jack was the founding General Manager in 1996. During his tenure, Griffin oversaw numerous acquisitions of print and digital properties.

Empirical Media

Griffin co-founded Empirical Media, a New York-based consulting firm, in 2011. At the helm of Empirical, Griffin served as a consultant to Tribune Company, where he worked with management to oversee the reorganization of the publishing unit to cut costs and streamline operations in preparation for its spinoff.

Tribune Publishing Company

In July 2013, Tribune Company made the decision to separate its publishing assets, including the Los Angeles Times, the Chicago Tribune and six other daily newspapers, from its broadcasting holdings into a stand-alone public company. Griffin was chief executive officer of the Tribune Publishing Company from April 14, 2014 to February 23, 2016.

Additional Work

Griffin was CEO of Time Inc. from 2010–2011—at which time it was the largest magazine publisher in the world. He was also a director of and senior advisor to Newsweek/Daily Beast from 2012–2013, when it was owned by IAC. From 1999 - 2003, Jack was the President and Publisher of Parade, when it was owned by Advance Publications and the Newhouse family. He was the Chairman the Magazine Publishers of America (MPA), the trade association for the consumer magazine industry. Griffin has also been Chairman of the American Advertising Federation (AAF), and as a Director of the Interactive Advertising Bureau (IAB) and the Audit Bureau of Circulations (ABC). Griffin was a Founding Director of Next Issue Media, a digital newsstand formed by a consortium of five leading publishers including Hearst Corporation, Conde Nast, News Corporation, Meredith Corporation and Time Inc. Griffin also worked at the Parade Division of Advance Publications (1999-2003), where he was President and Publisher of Parade Magazine. Additionally, Griffin was Vice President of Marketing for the Meredith Television Broadcasting Group.

Boards and Other Activities

Since 2018, Jack has been on the board of directors of Harte Hanks Inc. (HHS: NASDAQ). He is Chairman. He also was acting CEO, head of the audit committee, and Vice Chairman. Griffin is a Director of the Yale Center for Consumer Insights. He is also on the Business Advisory Board of Propublica, the investigative news organization.

Non-profit Work

Jack lends his expertise to nonprofit organizations, particularly in publishing. He is currently a board director for 41 North Media LLC, the nonprofit owner of the Nantucket Inquirer & Mirror, a 200-year-old community newspaper. He is also a director of America Media, publisher of America, the magazine for the Jesuit community.

For 20 years, Jack has been a director at Mustard Seed Communities, a Catholic charity based in Kingston, Jamaica, including 10 years as Chairman of the Board. He also spent eight years as a director of Catholic Relief Services, one of the world’s largest humanitarian relief organizations.

Awards and Honors

Griffin is the recipient of numerous honors and awards. He is a member of the AAF Advertising Hall of Achievement and received its Jack Avrett Award for industry and community service. He has also been recognized as Publishing Executive of the Year by Advertising Age.

Jack and his wife, Pamela, live on Nantucket and in Boston. Jack has completed several marathons and triathlons and plays competitive ice hockey. He is an avid fisherman, a US Coast Guard licensed boat captain, and an amateur guitarist.
