= Geraint Walsh =

- Born: Geraint Walsh; 19 May 1988 (age 38) Pontypridd, Wales
- Height: 180 cm (5 ft 11 in)
- Weight: 82 kg (12 st 13 lb)
- University: Loughborough University

Rugby union career
- Position(s): Centre, Wing, Fullback
- Current team: Cardiff Blues
Senior career
Years	Team	Apps	(Points)
2014-	Cardiff Blues	4	(0)
- Correct as of 16:47, 21 October 2015 (UTC)

Geraint Walsh (born 19 May 1988) is a Welsh rugby union player who plays for Cardiff Blues regional team as a centre, wing or fullback.

Walsh made his debut for the Cardiff Blues regional team in 2014 having previously played for Llantwit Fardre RFC, Pontypridd RFC and Western Pioneers RFC, Auckland. While studying at Loughborough University he was a member of the team that won the 2010 British Universities Cup and also represented Welsh Academicals.
