= James Loxton =

- Born: 2 February 1990 (age 36) Berlin, Germany
- Height: 1.75 m (5 ft 9 in)
- Weight: 86 kg (13 st 8 lb; 190 lb)

Rugby union career
- Position: Wing
Senior career
Years	Team	Apps	(Points)
2007–2009	Glamorgan Wanderers RFC	27	(57)
2009–2011	Cardiff Blues	5	(5)
2009–2011	Cardiff RFC	28	(35)
2011–2013	Connacht Rugby	4	(0)
2013–2013	Shannon RFC		
2013–2016	Cardiff RFC	67	(58)
2016–2022	Glamorgan Wanderers RFC		
International career
Years	Team	Apps	(Points)
2009–2010	Wales U20	17	(25)

James Loxton is a rugby union player. He has played at both wing and fullback. Although born in Berlin in Germany, Loxton was capped at U-19 and U-20 level for Wales, and competed in the 2009 IRB Junior World Championship as part of the Wales national under-20 rugby union team.

== Career ==
Loxton first played for Glamorgan Wanderers in the 2007–08 season, making 27 appearances over two seasons. He came through the Cardiff Blues academy and made his debut for the Blues on 24 April 2009, against Ulster. Loxton also played for Cardiff RFC, making his first appearance in September 2009 against Ebbw Vale.

He moved to Connacht Rugby in 2011. While potentially eligible to play for Ireland as he has an Irish mother, the Welsh Rugby Union reportedly questioned whether (having played at U-20 level for Wales) Loxton was committed to play for Wales at senior level. The International Rugby Board subsequently ruled that he could play for Ireland.

Loxton reportedly returned to the Connacht team after a "long-term knee injury" in early 2012, and was included in the Connacht squad (as a potential replacement) for a Heineken Cup game in January 2013. As of February 2013, Loxton was playing for All-Ireland League-side Shannon RFC.

Loxton was released from his contract with Connacht Rugby in mid-2013, and subsequently played with Cardiff RFC. Loxton departed Cardiff in 2016, and rejoined Glamorgan Wanderers RFC, where he played through the 2021–22 season.
