= David Nolan (rugby union) =

Dave Nolan
- Born: David Nolan; 19 June 1988 (age 38) Galway, Ireland
- Height: 2 m (6 ft 6 1/2 in)
- Weight: 120 kg (18 st 13 lb)

Rugby union career
- Position: Lock
- Current team: Doncaster Knights
Amateur team(s)
Years	Team	Apps	(Points)
- Galwegians
Senior career
Years	Team	Apps	(Points)
2009–2014	Connacht	2	(0)
2014–2015	Bourgoin	6	(0)
2016–	Doncaster Knights	6	(0)
- Correct as of 20 October 2016
International career
Years	Team	Apps	(Points)
2008	Ireland u20	5	(0)
- Correct as of 10 February 2015

Dave Nolan (born 19 June 1988) is a rugby union player from Ireland. He primarily plays as a lock. Nolan currently plays for Doncaster Knights in the English Championship. He has previously played for Connacht in Ireland and Bourgoin in France.

Nolan made his first appearance for Connacht in the 2009–10 Celtic League. His debut came on 25 April 2010, away against Welsh side Scarlets. Nolan started and played the full 80 minutes for his side as they lost 58–10. He also made an appearance for Connacht against the Newport Gwent Dragons as a replacement in the 2010–11 Celtic League, playing for 20 minutes.

During his time with Connacht, Nolan suffered a number of long-term injuries that kept him out of the game for long periods. He missed the 2011–12 season after breaking his leg in a pre-season game with Exeter. Another break to the same leg in training occurred shortly before the 2012–13 season, and caused Nolan to also miss that season.

In April 2014, it was announced that Nolan's contract would not be renewed and he would be leaving the province at the end of the season. In June 2014 he signed for French Pro D2 side Bourgoin.
