= James Rael =

- Born: James Rael; 25 March 1992 (age 34) Limerick, Ireland
- Height: 1.85 m (6 ft 1 in)
- Weight: 97 kg (15 st 4 lb)

Rugby union career
- Position: Hooker
Amateur team(s)
Years	Team	Apps	(Points)
- Garryowen
Senior career
Years	Team	Apps	(Points)
2013–2014	Connacht	2	(0)
- Correct as of 12 October 2013
International career
Years	Team	Apps	(Points)
2012	Ireland U20	9	(5)
- Correct as of 29 September 2013

James Rael (born 25 March 1992) is an Irish rugby union player. Rael played as a hooker. He most recently played professionally for Irish provincial side Connacht Rugby. Before joining Connacht, Rael was part of the academy at Munster and played his club rugby with Old Crescent RFC.

== Career ==
=== Connacht ===
Rael started his career in his native province of Munster, being part of the team's academy and played for the amateur club Old Crescent in the All-Ireland League. Ahead of the 2013–14 season, Rael signed a one-year development contract with fellow Irish provincial side Connacht. He made his debut for Connacht on 28 September 2013, coming off the bench against Ospreys in the 2013–14 Pro12.

In April 2014, it was announced that Rael failed to secure a renewed contract and he would be leaving the province at the end of the season.

=== Ireland ===
Rael has represented his country at under-age international level. He earned a total of nine caps for Ireland Under-20's, scoring a single try. Rael represented the team at the 2012 IRB Junior World Championship.
