= Buccaneers RFC =

Irish rugby union club, based in Athlone

Buccaneers
- Full name: Buccaneers Rugby Football Club
- Union: (Ireland) IRFU; Connacht
- Nickname: "Buccs"
- Founded: 1994; 32 years ago
- Region: County Westmeath
- Ground(s): Dubarry Park, Athlone (Capacity: 10,000)
- Chairman: Michael Stapleton & Thomas Conlon
- President: Lorna Stuart-Trainor
- Director of Rugby: Damien Shine
- Coach: Eddie O'Sullivan
- League: All-Ireland Div. 2A
- 2024–25: 10th - relegated
1st kit	2nd kit

Official website
- buccaneersrfc.com

Buccaneers Rugby Football Club is a rugby union club in Athlone, Ireland. They compete in Division 2A of the All-Ireland League. The club's colours are Black and Gold.

Although the club grounds are currently located in Leinster, it has always competed at underage, junior and senior level leagues in Connacht as Athlone RFC had previously.

== History ==
The team's name originates from the Shannon Buccaneers club founded by Diarmuid Murtagh from Athlone in the early 1930s. Fielding players such as British and Irish Lions captain Sammy Walker, the club later disbanded due to the Second World War.

More recently, in the 1993/94 season, the Athlone and Ballinasloe amalgamated in order to take part in the All-Ireland League. They were initially known as Athlone-Ballinasloe before changing their name to Buccaneers.

Ballinasloe withdrew from the amalgamation at the end of the 2005/06 season.

== Honours ==
- Connacht Senior League: 13
  - 1997-98, 1998–99, 1999-2000, 2003–04, 2005–06, 2006–07, 2007–08, 2010–11, 2015–16, 2016–17, 2017–18, 2018–19, 2022–23
- Connacht Senior Cup: 9
  - 1994-95, 1998–99, 1999-2000, 2003–04, 2005–06, 2006–07, 2014–15, 2016–17, 2021–22

== Dubarry Park ==
As part of a sponsorship deal with footwear brand Dubarry, the Buccaneers sports grounds was renamed Dubarry Park in 2003. It was officially opened by then IRFU President Don Crowley. Dubarry Park is a 10,000 capacity stadium with a state of the art club house and dressing room facilities, and has hosted U-21 and U-20 Irish home games for the Six Nations Championship. From 1998 to 2003 the venue was called Ericsson Park.

== Notable players ==
- Jordan Conroy – plays for the Ireland national rugby sevens team
- Robbie Henshaw – Ireland international
- Jack Carty – Connacht and Ireland International
