= Connemara RFC =

Irish rugby union club, based in Clifden, Co. Galway

(Ireland) Connemara RFC
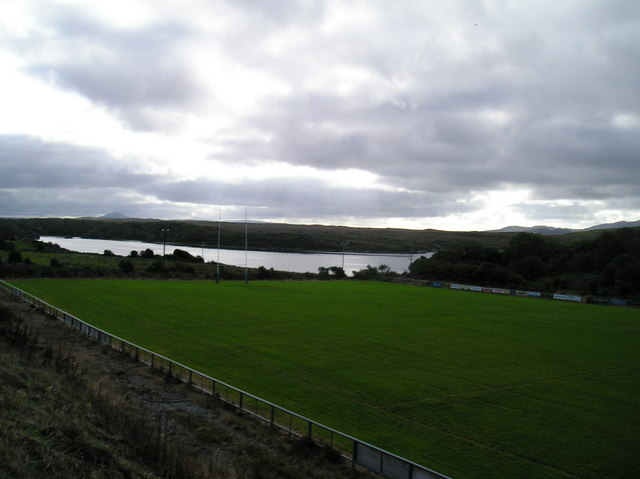
- Monastery Field, home ground of Connemara RFC
- Full name: Connemara Rugby Football Club
- Union: IRFU; Connacht
- Nickname: The Blacks
- Founded: 1974; 52 years ago
- Ground(s): Monastery Field, Clifden
- Chairman: Aidan O'Halloran
- President: Joe O'Connell
- Coach: Henry O'Toole
- Captain: Peter O'Toole
- League: Connacht Junior League 1A (2019 Champions)
Team kit

Connemara RFC is an Irish rugby union team based in Clifden, Connacht. They play in Connacht Junior League in Division 1A. The club colour is all black, based on the colours of a popular fishing fly called the Connemara black. The club formerly played senior rugby for over a decade.

== History ==
The Old Connemara Blacks

Rugby football was played in the Connemara area as early as the 1920s. Those employed in the Marconi Station played the game of rugby and took on Clifden in some friendly games. In the 1940s, Colleges such as Blackrock and Castleknock as well as Clongowes had a fair representation of Connemara youth. St. Josephs College, Garbally Park, Ballinasloe also had a very strong Clifden/Connemara contingent of students. All of those colleges at that time provided a pool of eager but idle rugby players, itching for a game, especially throughout the school holidays. This in turn brought about the formation of a new rugby team called the "Connemara Blacks", named after the famous fishing fly. Those credited with the idea of this team formation are James B. Joyce (known in rugby circles as "Dusty Foot") and the Oughterard Brothers Jim Joyce and Dr. Paddy Joyce. They contacted players and arranged fixtures with Galway Corinthians and Westport. The inaugural fixture was against Corinthians, at Woods’ Field in Clifden on St. Stephen’s Day 1946 which resulted in a 6-6 draw. The Connemara Blacks had their first win when they defeated Westport by 11-8 on 6 January 1947. Various members of the original Connemara Blacks went on to represent their Province, and play for some top clubs in the country and in England, especially London Irish.

== Origin of the club name ==
The club is named after a type of fishing fly called the Connemara Black.

== Current squad ==
Connemara Junior Rugby squad
**Props**: (Ireland) Emmet Ferrons; (Ireland) David O'Reilly; (Ireland) Kevin Barry; (Ireland) **Eugene Conroy**; (Ireland) **Ian Staunton**; **Hookers**: (Ireland) **Barry Gibbons**; **Locks**: (Ireland) **Niall Staunton**; (Ireland) Conor O'Malley	**Back row**: (Ireland) David McHugh; (Ireland) Paul Lee; (Ireland) **TJ Berry**; **Scrum-halves**: (Ireland) **Michael O'Toole**; **Fly-halves**: (Ireland) **Shane Sweeney**; (South Africa) **Curtis Jonas**	**Centres**: (Ireland) **David McDonagh** *; (Ireland) Eoin Burke; **Wings**: (Ireland) Peter O'Toole (c); (Ireland) **Marty Connelly**; (Ireland) Mark Kilkenny; **Fullbacks**: (Ireland) **Henry O'Toole** *
(c) denotes the team captain, **Bold** denotes Connacht Junior Selection, * denotes Connacht Junior Player Of The Year Winner

== Noticeable Ex Players ==
- (Ireland) Tiernan O'Halloran
- (New Zealand) Troy Nathan
- (Ireland) John O'Brien (Galway GAA Football)
- (Ireland) Oisin Heffernan (Nottingham R.F.C)
