= Sligo RFC =

Irish rugby union club based in Strandhill, Co.Sligo

(Republic of Ireland) Sligo Rugby
- Full name: Sligo Rugby Football Club
- Union: (Ireland) IRFU
- Branch: Connacht
- Founded: 1890; 136 years ago
- Location: Sligo
- Ground(s): Hamilton Park, Strandhill
- Chairman: Brian Roche
- President: Fineen O'Driscoll
- Coach: Ross O'Boyle
- League: A.I.L. Div. 2B
- 2024–25: 8th.
Team kit

Official website
- www.sligorugby.ie

Sligo Rugby Football Club is a rugby union club based in Strandhill, County Sligo, Ireland, playing in Division 2B of the All-Ireland League. The club was founded in 1890 making it one of the oldest in Ireland. It fields three adult men's teams, an adult women's team, boys and girls age-grade teams as well as a mini's section.

== Honours ==
- Connacht Senior League (3): 2019-20, 2023-24, 2024-25
- Connacht Senior Cup (3): 1913-14, 2017-18, 2019-20
