= Ballina R.F.C. =

Irish rugby union club based in Ballina, Co.Mayo

Ballina RFC
- Full name: Ballina Rugby Football Club
- Union: (Ireland) IRFU
- Branch: Connacht
- Founded: 1928; 98 years ago
- Location: Ballina
- Region: County Mayo
- Ground: Heffernan Park (Capacity: 1,000)
- Chairman: Alan Rowe
- President: Ed Gunning
- Coach: Brian McClearn
- Captain: Gary Kavanagh
- League: Connacht J1A
Team kit

Official website
- www.ballinarfc.com

Ballina R.F.C. is a rugby union club in Ballina, County Mayo, Ireland. The club is affiliated to the Connacht Branch of the Irish Rugby Football Union and plays in the Connacht J1A League since being relegated from the All-Ireland League at the end of the 2023-24 season.

The name of Heffernan Park, where the club plays its games, is taken from the grandfather of Dave Heffernan.

== Prominent figures ==
Seán Murphy was the club's first president, and he served 25 years for the club. He helped the club get its own grounds and a clubhouse back in 1978.

Gerry O’Donnell served a season as president of Connacht rugby (in that season Connacht won the pro 12.) and was a president of Ballina as well. O'Donnell died in 2023.

== Honours ==
- Connacht Senior League: 5.5
  - 1928-29, 1929–30, 1950-51 (shared), 1952–53, 1991–92, 2021–22
