= Kyle Tonetti =

South African rugby union player (born 1987)

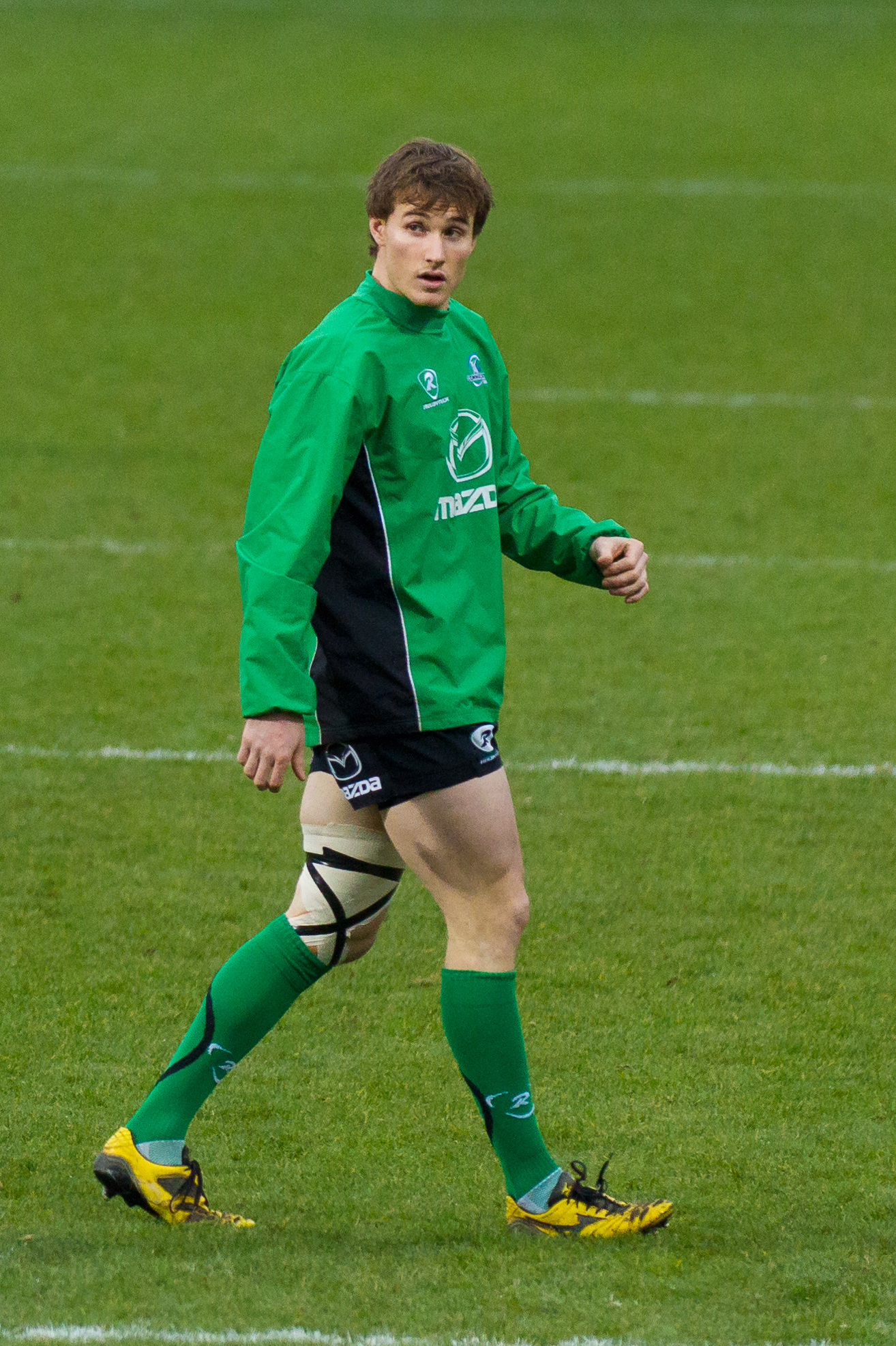
- Born: Kyle Tonetti; 8 October 1987 (age 39) Durban, South Africa
- Height: 1.85 m (6 ft 1 in)
- Weight: 93 kg (14.6 st)
- School: St Gerard's School; Blackrock College

Rugby union career
- Position: Centre
Amateur team(s)
Years	Team	Apps	(Points)
- Blackrock College RFC
Senior career
Years	Team	Apps	(Points)
2008–10	Leinster	3	(0)
2010–11	Sale Sharks	14	(17)
2011–2014	Connacht	18	(0)
- Correct as of 20 January 2014
International career
Years	Team	Apps	(Points)
2007	Ireland U20	2	(0)
2009	Ireland 7s	1	
- Correct as of 9 March 2007

Kyle Tonetti (born 8 October 1987) is a South Africa born former rugby union player, who represented Ireland at various international levels. He primarily played as a centre, though he also played at fly-half earlier in his career. He last played for Irish provincial team Connacht in the Pro12 before being forced to retire prematurely due to injury.

== Career ==
=== Club ===
Tonetti started out his senior club career at Leinster after coming through the prestigious Blackrock College and playing in the All-Ireland League for the college's team. He made only 1 appearance for the senior Leinster team in the 2008–09 Celtic League, and 2 appearances in the 2009–10 competition, while making no European appearances. Tonetti also made 21 appearances for the province's second-tier side Leinster A. He left Leinster in 2010, joining Premiership side Sale Sharks.

Tonetti made his debut for Sale against the Newcastle Falcons on 3 September 2010. He scored his first try for the team in a match against Harlequins on 17 September, as the Sharks won 21–17. He also played in the 2010–11 European Challenge Cup for Sale, making his first European appearance on 11 December 2010 against Brive, and also played them in the return game on 20 December. On 22 January 2011, Tonetti scored his first European try, crossing the line against El Salvador. In total Tonetti made 13 appearances in the 2010–11 Premiership along with his 3 Challenge Cup appearances scoring a try in each competition. His final appearance for Sale came against Wasps on 17 September 2011, taking his total appearances in the Premiership for the side to 14.

Tonetti left the Sharks at the start of the 2011–12 season, joining Irish province Connacht. This reunited him with his former coach Eric Elwood, who Tonetti had played under with the 2007 Ireland Under-20 team. He made his debut for Connacht against Benetton Treviso on 2 December 2011. Tonetti's next game for the province came in the Heineken Cup, where he played for Connacht in their Pool 6 match at home to Gloucester. He played against Harlequins, starting at outside centre in a 9–8 win, Connacht's first ever victory in the competition. By the end of the season, Tonetti had made 16 appearances for Connacht, 12 in the Pro 12, and 4 in the Heineken Cup.

Tonetti was forced to retire from rugby on 19 March 2014 due to a long-standing ankle injury.

=== International ===
Despite being born in Durban, South Africa, Tonetti played at a number of under-age levels for Ireland, including Under-19 and Under-20 level. He was a part of the Ireland Under-20 squad that achieved a grand slam in the 2007 Six Nations Under 20s Championship.

Tonetti has also played for the Irish sevens team, the national team for Rugby sevens. He was part of the Irish squad for the 2009 Sevens World Cup.
