= Galwegians RFC =

Irish rugby union club, based in Galway

(Republic of Ireland) Galwegians RFC
- Full name: Galwegian Rugby Football Club
- Union: (Ireland) IRFU
- Branch: Connacht
- Nickname(s): Wegians, Sky Blues
- Founded: 1922; 104 years ago
- Ground(s): Crowley Park, Galway (Capacity: 2000)
- Chairman: Mike Ryan
- President: Pat Surlis
- Coach: Brendan Guilfoyle
- Captain: Dylan Keane
- League: All-Ireland League Div. 2A
- 2025–26: 1st in Division 2B
Team kit

Official website
- www.galwegians.ie

Galwegians Rugby Football Club is a rugby union club in Galway, Ireland.

Galwegians field over 16 teams including Men's and Women's Senior (Firsts), Junior (Seconds) and Men's Thirds as well as underage sides at all levels from U20 to U7.

The Galwegians Men's Senior side plays in Division 2A of the All-Ireland League, the Irish domestic club competition.

The Galwegians Women's Senior side plays in the Women's All Ireland League, the Irish domestic club competition.

The Connacht Rugby squad features a number of players who played for Galwegians. The Connacht Women's representative side has strong representation from Galwegians.

== History ==
Founded in 1922, Galwegians has a long and distinguished history at the forefront of Connacht Rugby. In 1928, The Sportsground or the Sports Field as it was also known opened and Galwegians RFC were the first to use the ground after moving from the Grammar School grounds. The club moved to its current Crowley Park grounds on the Dublin Road in Galway in 1963.

Jimmy Joyce was the club's first international in wartime 1943. The tradition continued into the 1950s with Dicky Roche, Brendan Guerin, Charlie Lydon, Tony O’Sullivan and Johnny Dooley each gaining caps. More recently, Eric Elwood, Gavin Duffy, John Muldoon and Bundee Aki have played regularly for Ireland.

The golden age of Galwegians rugby was the five-in-a-row Connacht League and Cup double in 1955–1960, an unprecedented feat in Irish rugby, when Wegians were arguably the best team in the country, regularly beating the other senior clubs in Ireland.

Galwegians have been an All Ireland League club since qualifying in 1992 when coached by Warren Gatland. The club rose to division 1 status in 1998 by winning division 2 in the 1997-1998 season and remained through most of the 2000s. It regained division 1A status in 2015 after winning 2A then 1B in the preceding two seasons. Despite falling to 2C by 2023, Galwegians achieved promotion back to 2B in 2024 and won that division to reach 2A again for the 2026-27 season.

Of current Connacht "Senior Clubs" Galwegians have the record of winning the most Connacht Senior Cup with 33 wins to date, although UCG have won 34 but became a "Junior Club" in 1996.

Since 2000 Galwegians have 8 Connacht Senior Cup and 10 Connacht Senior League titles including Cup and League doubles in the 2000–01, 2001–02 then three in a row in the 2011–12, 2012–13 and 2013–14 seasons.

Galwegians Junior team broke a 34-year wait for Connacht Cup glory by beating Monivea in the final to become Heineken Connacht Junior Cup Champions in 2008, and repeated that feat in 2012 and 2014.

In 2011 the Galwegians U17 team were All Ireland U17 champions and they were runners up in 2014. In 2012, 2014 and 2016 the Galwegians Women's team were All Ireland Women's Cup winners.

== Honours ==
- Connacht Senior Cup - 17 wins
- Connacht Senior League - 24 wins
- Connacht Junior Cup - 8 Wins

Last Updated: 28-07-2014

== Notable players ==
=== Ireland ===
(Player capped while playing with Galwegians RFC)

MEN

- 1944 - Jimmy Joyce
- 1955 - Dickie Roche
- 1956 - Brendan Guerin
- 1956 - Charlie Lydon
- 1957 - Tony O’Sullivan
- 1959 - Johnny Dooley
- 1997 - Eric Elwood
- 1998 - Pat Duignan
- 1999 - Matt Mostyn
- 2007 - Gavin Duffy
- 2009 - John Muldoon
- 2012 - Ronan Loughney
- 2016 - Niyi Adeolokun
- 2017 - Bundee Aki
- 2025 - Caolin Blade

WOMEN

- 1997 - Stephanie Dowling Folan
- 1998 - Sue Ramsbottom
- 2003 - Nuala Ni Chadhain
- 2008 - Carol Staunton
- 2012 - Ruth O'Reilly
- 2014 - Sene Naoupu
- 2015 - Mairead Coyne
- 2015 - Mary Healy
- 2016 - Nicole Fowley
- 2016 - Ciara O'Connor
- 2018 - Laura Feely
- 2018 - Edel McMahon

=== Barbarians ===
Several Galwegians players have represented the famous invitational side Barbarians. The most recent to play while in Galwegians colours is Niyi Adeolokun in a 27 May 2018 match against England at Twickenham which the Baa-Baa's won 45-63.

==== Representatives ====
- 1993 - Eric Elwood
- 1998 - Jimmy Duffy
- 1998 - Willie Ruane
- 2016 - Niyi Adeolokun

==== British & Irish Lions ====
- 2021 to SA- Bundee Aki (6 Apps, 3 Tests)

=== IRFU Presidents ===
Galwegians surely hold the distinction of having provided more IRFU Presidents than any other club. The incumbents have been:

- 1945-46 - Henry Anderson - L.D.S.I.,
- 1958-59 - Johnny Glynn
- 1968-69 - Chris P Crowley
- 1981-82 - John Moore - B.Sc.
- 1996-97 - Bobby Deacy - F.C.A.
- 2002-03 - Don Crowley - B.E., Eur. Ing., C.Eng., M.I.E.I.
- 2012-13 - William B. (Billy) Glynn
