= University of Galway RFC =

Irish rugby union club, based in Galway

(Republic of Ireland) University of Galway Rugby Club
- Full name: University of Galway Rugby Football Club
- Union: (Ireland) IRFU
- Branch: Connacht
- Nickname: UG
- Founded: 1874; 152 years ago
- Region: Galway
- Ground: Dangan (Capacity: 1,000)
- Chairman: Jason O'Halloran
- President: Peter Alan
- Coach(es): Colm Rigney, Diarmuid Codyre,
- Captain: James Brogan
- League(s): Connacht Rugby Senior Men's J1B, Woman's Connacht League, U20s JP Flannagan
Team kit

Official website
- nuigrugby.ie

University of Galway RFC is the rugby team of the University of Galway. Their colours are maroon and white.

== History ==
The rugby club was founded in 1874 at the time the university was named Queens College Galway, which makes it the oldest club in Connacht. They played in the Bateman Cup competition many times and won their first Connacht Senior Cup in 1897. They have held this trophy aloft 34 times in all, more than any other club in the Connacht, and they have won the senior league 16 times. They won the Dudley Cup for the first time in 1905.

They have had many successes down through the years, but a real highlight was the 1962/63 season when they swept the boards — they won the Connacht Minor League and Minor Cup, the Connacht Junior League and Junior Cup, the Connacht Senior League and Senior Cup, the OLBC Sevens and the Blake Sevens.

Many of their players have played for Irish universities international teams, and 10 have been capped for Ireland, several while playing for UCG. One of those, Ciaran Fitzgerald, Captained Ireland to a Triple Crown in 1982, and subsequently the 1983 British and Irish Lions tour to New Zealand.

== Current status ==
Currently UG do not compete in the All-Ireland League, but they participate in Connacht Rugby competitions, and for 2026/2027 will field two teams at Junior League level (J1B & J2A).

Their Under-20 team plays in the Irish Universities Conroy Cup competing against UCC, UCD, QUB, TCD, DU, UL & Maynooth.

In League competition along with two other Connacht Clubs (Galwegians & Galway Corinthians) they compete in the Leinster Rugby JP Fanagan Under-20 League - in division Premier 3.

They have also set up a Rugby Youth Academy in an attempt to help strengthen the club.

== Women's rugby ==
The women's team was set up in the 2002–2003 season. Their first official game was in 2004 versus Sligo I.T. In the 2008/2009 season, UG women won the Connacht League. In the 2012/2013 season, UG contested the Colleges & Universities Sports Association of Ireland Div 1 College League Final against UL. In 2013/2014 and again in 2014/2015, UG won the Irish Universities Rugby Union Kay Bowen Intervarsity Cup. Since 2021, the women's team has won the SSI tier 2 League 3 times and the Cup twice. They have also placed top 3 in the league for the last 4 years running, making it to Cup finals or plate finals every year.

== Notable players ==
- Steve Cunningham
- Seamus Dennison — played for Munster in their historic 1978 defeat of the All Blacks at Thomond Park, executing a much heralded tackle against his opponents
- Ciaran Fitzgerald — captained the British and Irish Lions and Connacht and won a Triple Crown while captaining Ireland
- Neville Furlong — scored the last try worth four points by an Irish player before a change in the game's rules
- Eamonn McGuire — played for Ireland
- Mick Molloy — earned 27 caps for Ireland between 1966 and 1973
- Dickie Roche — played for Ireland, including when at university
