= 2016–17 Connacht Rugby season =

Connacht
- 2016–17 season
- Head coach: Pat Lam
- Chief executive: Willie Ruane
- Captain: John Muldoon
- Pro12: 8th
- Champions Cup: Pool stage (3rd)
- Top try scorer: All: Niyi Adeolokun (8)
- Top points scorer: All: Craig Ronaldson (100)
- Highest home attendance: 8,091 v Toulouse; 15 October 2016
- Lowest home attendance: 4,091 v Zebre; 3 March 2017
- Average home attendance: 6,386
Home colours	Away colours

The 2016–17 season was Irish provincial rugby union side Connacht Rugby's sixteenth season competing in the Pro12, and the team's twenty-first season as a professional side. It was Pat Lam's fourth and final season in charge of the side.

Connacht finished the season in eight place in the league. As well as playing in the Pro12, Connacht competed in the Champions Cup in Europe, finishing third in their pool, level on points with Toulouse, who advanced to the knockout stage as one of the best runners-up. The second-tier side the Connacht Eagles competed in the 2016–17 British and Irish Cup, finishing bottom of their pool.

== Background ==
Connacht started the season with a new coaching team. Backs and kicking coach Andre Bell left his role to return to his family in New Zealand. Head performance analyst and assistant attack coach Conor McPhillips took over coaching of the backs, while the team's former head coach Eric Elwood took over coaching kicking. The close season also saw the departure of the side's all-time record try-scorer Fionn Carr who scored 42 tries over two spells with the province. During the off-season, the team's homeground, The Sportsground underwent renovations with the addition of a seated stand increasing its capacity to 8,100.

== Coaching and management team ==
Note: Flags indicate national union as has been defined under WR eligibility rules. Individuals may hold more than one non-WR nationality.

Role	Name	Union
Chief executive	Willie Ruane	Ireland
Head coach	Pat Lam	Samoa (Note: New Zealand-born and qualified for Samoa, Lam has represented both countries, but last played rugby for Samoa.)
Team manager	Tim Allnut	New Zealand
Forwards Coach	Jimmy Duffy	Ireland
Backs Coach	Conor McPhillips	Ireland
Skills Coach	Dave Ellis; Mossy Lawler	Ireland
Kicking Coach	Eric Elwood	Ireland
Head Performance Analyst	Simon Kavanagh	Ireland
Head of Fitness	Paul Bunce	New Zealand
Academy manager	Nigel Carolan	Ireland
Connacht Eagles Coach	Mossy Lawler	Ireland
Consultant Coach	Nathan White	Ireland

== Players ==
=== Senior playing squad ===
Note: Flags indicate national union under World Rugby eligibility rules. Players may hold more than one non-World Rugby nationality.

Player	Position	Union
Shane Delahunt	Hooker	Ireland
Dave Heffernan	Hooker	Ireland
Tom McCartney	Hooker	New Zealand
John Andress	Prop	Ireland
**Finlay Bealham**	Prop	Ireland
Denis Buckley	Prop	Ireland
Conor Carey	Prop	Ireland
JP Cooney	Prop	Ireland
**Ronan Loughney**	Prop	Ireland
Peter McCabe	Prop	Ireland
Dominic Robertson-McCoy*	Prop	New Zealand
Ivan Soroka	Prop	Ireland
Andrew Browne	Lock	Ireland
James Cannon*	Lock	England
**Ultan Dillane**	Lock	Ireland
Ben Marshall	Lock	Ireland
Danny Qualter	Lock	Ireland
**Quinn Roux**	Lock	Ireland
Lewis Stevenson	Lock	Ireland
James Connolly	Flanker	Ireland
**Naulia Dawai**	Flanker	Fiji
Nepia Fox-Matamua	Flanker	New Zealand
Jake Heenan*	Flanker	New Zealand
Rory Moloney	Flanker	Ireland
Seán O'Brien	Flanker	Ireland
Eoghan Masterson	Number 8	Ireland
Eoin McKeon	Number 8	Ireland
**John Muldoon** (c)	Number 8	Ireland

Player	Position	Union
Caolin Blade	Scrum-half	Ireland
John Cooney	Scrum-half	Ireland
**Kieran Marmion**	Scrum-half	Ireland
**Marnitz Boshoff**	Fly-half	South Africa
Jack Carty	Fly-half	Ireland
Steve Crosbie	Fly-half	Ireland
Shane O'Leary*	Fly-half	Canada
Bundee Aki	Centre	New Zealand
Tom Farrell	Centre	Ireland
Eoin Griffin	Centre	Ireland
Rory Parata	Centre	Ireland
Peter Robb	Centre	Ireland
Craig Ronaldson	Centre	Ireland
**Niyi Adeolokun**	Wing	Ireland
**Matt Healy**	Wing	Ireland
Stacey Ili	Wing	New Zealand
Cian Kelleher	Wing	Ireland
Danie Poolman*	Wing	South Africa
Darragh Leader	Fullback	Ireland
**Tiernan O'Halloran**	Fullback	Ireland
Josh Rowland	Fullback	Ireland

- Players qualified to play for Ireland on dual nationality or residency grounds*
- Senior 15's internationally capped players in **bold**
- Irish Provinces were limited to four non-Irish eligible (NIE) players and one non-Irish qualified player (NIQ or "Project Player"). Connacht Rugby is exempted from this under a separate development arrangement

=== Academy squad ===
Note: Flags indicate national union under World Rugby eligibility rules. Players may hold more than one non-World Rugby nationality.

Player	Position	Union
Jack Dineen	Hooker	Ireland year 3
Pat O'Toole	Hooker	Ireland year 2
Jamie Dever	Prop	Ireland year 3
Conor Kenny	Prop	Ireland year 1
Conor Kyne	Prop	Ireland year 2
Saba Meunargia	Prop	Ireland year 3
Conán O'Donnell	Prop	Ireland year 2
Peter Claffey	Lock	Ireland year 1
Cillian Gallagher	Lock	Ireland year 1
Cian Romaine	Lock	Ireland year 2
Marc Kelly	Flanker	Ireland year 3
Stephen McVeigh	Flanker	Ireland year 3

Player	Position	Union
Stephen Kerins	Scrum-half	Ireland year 1
Conor Lowndes	Scrum-half	Ireland year 2
Conor McKeon	Scrum-half	Ireland year 3
Matthew Byrne	Wing	Ireland year 1
Ciaran Gaffney	Wing	Ireland year 3
Adam Leavy	Wing	Ireland year 1
Ed O'Keefe	Wing	Ireland year 2
Cormac Brennan	Fullback	Ireland year 2

== Senior Team Transfers ==
=== Players in ===
- HK (Ireland) Shane Delahunt promoted from academy
- PR (Ireland) John Andress from (Ireland) Munster
- PR (Ireland) Conor Carey from (England) Nottingham
- PR (Ireland) Peter McCabe from (Ireland) Munster (loan)
- PR (New Zealand) Dominic Robertson-McCoy from (New Zealand) Northland
- PR (Ireland) Ivan Soroka from (Ireland) Clontarf
- LK (England) James Cannon from (England) Wasps
- LK (Ireland) Lewis Stevenson from (England) Exeter Chiefs
- FL (Ireland) James Connolly promoted from academy
- FL (Fiji) Naulia Dawai from (New Zealand) Otago
- FL (Ireland) Rory Moloney promoted from academy
- FL (Ireland) Seán O'Brien promoted from academy
- FH (South Africa) Marnitz Boshoff from (South Africa) Lions
- FH (Ireland) Steve Crosbie from (Ireland) Munster
- CE (Ireland) Tom Farrell from (England) Bedford Blues
- CE (Ireland) Eoin Griffin from (England) London Irish
- CE (Ireland) Rory Parata promoted from the academy
- CE (Ireland) Peter Robb promoted from the academy
- WG (New Zealand) Stacey Ili from (New Zealand) Auckland
- WG (Ireland) Cian Kelleher from (Ireland) Leinster
- FB Josh Rowland from Ireland Sevens

=== Players out ===
- HK (Ireland) Jason Harris-Wright to (England) London Irish
- PR (Ireland) Rodney Ah You to (Ireland) Ulster
- PR (Ireland) Nathan White retired
- LK (England) Aly Muldowney to (France) Grenoble
- N8 (New Zealand) George Naoupu to (England) Harlequins
- SH (Ireland) Ian Porter to (Ireland) Banbridge
- FH (United States) AJ MacGinty to (England) Sale Sharks
- CE (Ireland) Conor Finn to (Ireland) Buccaneers
- CE (Ireland) Robbie Henshaw to (Ireland) Leinster
- CE (Ireland) Dave McSharry retired
- CE (New Zealand) Api Pewhairangi to (England) London Broncos
- WG (Ireland) Fionn Carr to (Ireland) Naas

== Results ==
=== Pro12 ===
2016–17 Pro12
	Team	P	W	D	L	PF	PA	PD	TF	TA	Try bonus	Losing bonus	Pts
1	(Ireland) Munster (RU)	22	19	0	3	602	316	+286	77	34	9	1	86
2	(Ireland) Leinster (SF)	22	18	0	4	674	390	+284	91	47	12	1	85
3	(Wales) Scarlets (CH)	22	17	0	5	537	359	+178	66	40	9	0	77
4	(Wales) Ospreys (SF)	22	14	0	8	556	360	+196	74	42	10	3	69
5	(Ireland) Ulster	22	14	1	7	521	371	+150	68	47	6	4	68
6	(Scotland) Glasgow Warriors	22	11	0	11	540	464	+76	72	53	9	5	58
7	(Wales) Cardiff Blues	22	11	1	10	508	498	+10	59	60	3	4	53
8	(Ireland) Connacht	22	9	0	13	413	498	−85	47	61	5	3	44
9	(Scotland) Edinburgh	22	6	0	16	400	491	−91	46	59	1	6	31
10	(Italy) Benetton Treviso	22	5	0	17	316	664	−348	35	92	1	2	23
11	(Wales) Newport Gwent Dragons	22	4	0	18	368	569	−201	38	71	1	6	23
12	(Italy) Zebre	22	3	0	19	318	773	−455	38	105	1	6	19
If teams are level at any stage, tiebreakers are applied in the following order: 1. number of matches won; 2. the difference between points for and points against; 3. the number of tries scored; 4. the most points scored; 5. the difference between tries for and tries against; 6. the fewest red cards received; 7. the fewest yellow cards received.
Green background (rows 1 to 4) are play-off places and earn a place in the 2017–18 European Rugby Champions Cup. Blue background indicates teams outside the play-off places that earn a place in the European Rugby Champions Cup. Yellow background advances to a play-off for a chance to compete in the Champions Cup. (Q) indicates team has qualified for the play-offs and has qualified for the 2017–18 European Rugby Champions Cup.

3 September 2016
17:15

Connacht (Ireland)	5–41	(Scotland) Glasgow Warriors (1 BP)
Try: Adeolokun 32' m	Report	Try: Seymour (2) 10' m, 36' m Hogg 45' c Swinson 52' c Puafisi 58' c Lamont 70' c Con: Pyrgos (3/5); Clegg (1/1); Pen: Pyrgos (1/1) 24'

The Sportsground
Attendance: 6,063
Referee: Ian Davies (WRU)

10 September 2016
19:35

Connacht (Ireland)	11–32	(Wales) Ospreys (1 BP)
Try: McKeon 57' m Pen: Carty (2/2) 20', 46'	Report	Try: Webb (2) 29' c, 74' c Ardron 71' m Hassler 77' c Con: S. Davies (3/4) 29', 74', 77'; Pen: S. Davies (2/2) 5', 63'

The Sportsground
Attendance: 5,749
Referee: Ben Whitehouse (WRU)

17 September 2016
18:05

Zebre (Italy)	Postponed	(Ireland) Connacht

Stadio Sergio Lanfranchi
Referee: Ian Davies (WRU)

After 40 minutes of play, the match was "abandoned due to adverse weather conditions causing considerable risk to both the players and spectators". Zebre were leading 22–10 (3 tries to 1) when the match was abandoned. A rescheduled fixture was played on 1 April 2017.

24 September 2016
19:35

Scarlets (Wales)	17–8	(Ireland) Connacht
Try: Li. Williams (2) 36' c, 66' c Con: Patchell (2/2) 36', 66'; Pen: Patchell (1/1) 71'	Report	Try: Adeolokun 22' m Pen: Carty (1/1) 40'

Parc y Scarlets
Attendance: 5,630
Referee: George Clancy (IRFU)

30 September 2016
19:35

(1 BP) Connacht (Ireland)	28–15	(Scotland) Edinburgh
Try: Adeolokun 9' c Roux 36' m Kelleher 45' m Robb 73' m Con: Carty (1/4); Pen: Carty (2/2) 17', 23'	Report	Try: Gilchrist 19' c Allen 70' m Con: Tovey (1/2); Pen: Tovey (1/1) 5'

The Sportsground
Attendance: 5,771
Referee: Nigel Owens (WRU)

7 October 2016
19:35

(1 BP) Connacht (Ireland)	30–25	(Ireland) Ulster (1 BP)
Try: Carty 2' c Kelleher (2) 23' m, 52' m Connolly 25' c Con: Carty (2/4); Pen: Carty (2/2) 37', 59'	Report	Try: Gilroy 33' m Best 41' c Payne 44' c Con: Jackson (2/3); Pen: Jackson (2/2) 5', 65'

The Sportsground
Attendance: 6,194
Referee: Gary Conway (IRFU)

29 October 2016
17:15

Leinster (Ireland)	24–13	(Ireland) Connacht
Try: Byrne 49'; Daly 75' c Con: Nacewa (1/2) 76'; Pen: Nacewa (4/4) 23', 32', 38', 58'	Report	Try: Delahunt 80' c Con: Carty (1/1) 80'; Pen: Ronaldson (2/2) 4', 13'

RDS Arena
Attendance: 18,200
Referee: John Lacey (IRFU)

4 November 2016
19:15

Newport Gwent Dragons (Wales)	21–16	(Ireland) Connacht (1 BP)
Try: Hewitt (2) 14' c, 46' c Con: O'Brien (2/2) 14', 46'; Pen: O'Brien (1/1) 21'; Drop: O'Brien (2/2) 36', 52'	Report	Try: Adeolokun 69' c Con: Carty (1/1) 69'; Pen: Carty (3/3) 25', 39', 59'

Rodney Parade
Attendance: 4,522
Referee: George Clancy (IRFU)

25 November 2016
19:35

Connacht (Ireland)	18–7	(Wales) Cardiff Blues
Try: Cooney 15' c Aki 56' m Con: Cooney (1/2) 16'; Pen: Cooney (2/2) 40', 49'	Report	Try: James 17' c Con: Shingler (1/1) 18'

The Sportsground
Attendance: 6,190
Referee: Nigel Owens (WRU)

3 December 2016
15:00

(1 BP) Connacht (Ireland)	47–8	(Italy) Benetton Treviso
Try: McCartney (2) 14' c, 32' c Poolman 26' c Buckley 38' c Cooney 50' c Heffernan 55' m Carty 74' c Con: Cooney (4/4) 14', 26', 32', 38'; Boshoff (1/1) 50'; Carty (1/2) 74'	Report	Try: Flammini 67' c Con: McKinley (1/1) 5'

The Sportsground
Attendance: 5,903
Referee: Ian Davies (WRU)

23 December 2016
19:35

Ulster (Ireland)	23–7	(Ireland) Connacht
Try: McCloskey 26' c Ross 52' c Con: Jackson (2/2) 28', 53'; Pen: Jackson (3/3) 20', 36', 67'	Report	Try: Carty 55'; Con: Carty (1/1) 56'

Kingspan Stadium
Attendance: 17,613
Referee: George Clancy (IRFU)

31 December 2016
17:30

(1 BP) Connacht (Ireland)	9–16	(Ireland) Munster
Pen: Carty (3/4) 30', 50', 76'	Report	Try: Marshall 56' c Con: Keatley (1/1) 57'; Pen: Keatley (2/3) 2', 39'; Drop: Keatley (1/2) 68'

The Sportsground
Attendance: 8,090
Referee: David Wilkinson (IRFU)

7 January 2017
13:30

(1 BP) Ospreys (Wales)	29–7	(Ireland) Connacht
Try: Baker 11' c Cracknell 13' c Smith 56' c Beck 79' m Con: S. Davies (3/3) 12', 14', 57'; Pen: S. Davies (1/1) 44'	Report	Try: O'Brien 75' c Con: Cooney (1/1) 77'

Liberty Stadium
Attendance: 6,669
Referee: John Lacey (IRFU)

12 February 2017
17:05

(1 BP) Cardiff Blues (Wales)	13–19	(Ireland) Connacht
Try: N. Williams 28' c Con: Anscombe (1/1) 28'; Pen: Anscombe (2/2) 12', 20'	Report	Try: Healy 39' c Con: Cooney (1/1) 39'; Pen: Cooney (2/2) 44', 64'; Ronaldson (1/1) 80'; Drop: O'Halloran (1/1) 78'

BT Sport Cardiff Arms Park
Attendance: 4,300
Referee: Marius Mitrea (FIR)

18 February 2017
19:35

(1 BP) Connacht (Ireland)	14–9	(Wales) Newport Gwent Dragons (1 BP)
Try: O'Halloran 5' c Blade 13' c Con: Ronaldson (2/2) 5', 13'	Report	Pen: O'Brien (3/3) 18', 42', 53'

The Sportsground
Attendance: 6,190
Referee: Nigel Owens (WRU)

26 February 2017
13:30

Benetton Treviso (Italy)	19–34	(Ireland) Connacht (1 BP)
Try: Buondonno 37' m Sperandio 70' c Odiete 75' c Con: Tebaldi (1/1) 37'; Buondonno (1/1) 75' c	Report	Try: Blade 27' c Bealham 31' c Ronaldson 47' c O'Halloran 60' c Con: Ronaldson (3/3) 27', 31', 47'; Carty (1/1) 60'; Pen: Ronaldson (2/2) 15', 21'

Stadio Comunale di Monigo
Attendance: 1,500
Referee: Ian Davies (WRU)

3 March 2017
19:35

(1 BP) Connacht (Ireland)	33–3	(Italy) Zebre
Try: Adeolokun 8' c Dawai 26' m Muldoon 61' c Penalty try 66' c Stevenson 75' c Con: Cooney (1/2) 8'; O'Halloran (1/1) 61'; Ronaldson (1/1) 75'	Report	Pen: Palazzani (1/1) 45'

The Sportsground
Attendance: 4,091
Referee: Marius Mitrea (FIR)

25 March 2017
17:15

(1 BP) Glasgow Warriors (Scotland)	35–24	(Ireland) Connacht
Try: Flynn 11' c Russell 49' c Price 54' c Lamont 77' m Con: Russell (3/3) 12', 50', 54'; Pen: Russell (2/2) 7', 36'; P. Horne (1/1) 74'	Report	Try: Adeolokun 4' m Muldoon 29' c Con: Ronaldson (1/2) 30'; Pen: Ronaldson (3/4) 19', 48', 66'; J. Cooney (1/1) 76'

Scotstoun Stadium
Attendance: 7,351
Referee: Ian Davies (WRU)

1 April 2017
15:30

Zebre (Italy)	25–22	(Ireland) Connacht (1 BP)
Try: Minnie 24' c Boni 41' m Padovani 66' c Con: Canna (2/3) 26', 67'; Pen: Canna (2/3) 7', 31'	Report	Try: Ili 1' m Ronaldson 13' c Rowland 78' c Con: J. Cooney (1/2) 14'; Ronaldson (1/1) 79'; Pen: J. Cooney (1/2) 47'

Stadio Sergio Lanfranchi
Attendance: 2,000
Referee: Mike Adamson (SRU)

- Game rescheduled from 17 September 2016.

7 April 2017
19:35

(1 BP) Edinburgh (Scotland)	19–22	(Ireland) Connacht
Try: Penalty try 63' c Watson 66' c G. Bryce 73' m Con: Weir (2/3) 63', 67'	Report	Try: E. McKeon 29' c Con: Crosbie (1/1) 30'; Pen: Crosbie (5/5) 8', 26', 36', 49', 60'

New Myreside
Attendance: 3,189
Referee: Dan Jones (WRU)

15 April 2017
19:35

Connacht (Ireland)	24–37	(Ireland) Leinster (1 BP)
Try: Poolman 18' c Heffernan 49' m Con: Ronaldson (1/2) 18'; Pen: Ronaldson (4/4) 1', 12', 28', 40'	Report	Try: Kirchner 6' m A. Byrne 10' c O'Loughlin 34' m Ruddock 52' c B. Daly 68'c Con: R. Byrne (3/5) 10', 53', 68'; Pen: R. Byrne (2/2) 20', 76'

The Sportsground
Attendance: 8,090
Referee: Ian Davies (WRU)

29 April 2017
20:00

Connacht (Ireland)	8–30	(Wales) Scarlets (1 BP)
Try: Ronaldson 58' m Pen: Boshoff (1/1) 11'		Try: McNicholl 4' c S. Evans (2) 14' m, 26' m L. Williams 31' m van der Merwe 78' m Con: Patchell (1/5) 5'; Pen: Patchell (1/1) 66'

The Sportsground
Attendance: 5,290
Referee: Mike Adamson (SRU)

6 May 2017
17:15

(1 BP) Munster (Ireland)	50–14	(Ireland) Connacht
Try: Earls 8' c O'Donoghue 27' c Conway (2) 33' c, 54' c Cronin 43' c Saili 70' c Oliver 80' m Con: Keatley (6/7) 8', 28', 34', 44', 54', 70'; Pen: Keatley (1/1) 25'		Try: Kelleher 51' c Dawai 64' c Con: Ronaldson (2/2) 52', 65'

Thomond Park
Attendance: 18,567
Referee: David Wilkinson (IRFU)

=== Champions Cup ===
==== Pool 1 ====
Team	P	W	D	L	PF	PA	Diff	TF	TA	TB	LB	Pts
(England) Wasps (5)	6	4	1	1	210	112	+98	28	13	3	1	22
(France) Toulouse (7)	6	3	1	2	164	91	+73	22	10	2	2	18
(Ireland) Connacht	6	4	0	2	188	118	+70	26	15	2	0	18
(Italy) Zebre	6	0	0	6	90	331	−241	11	49	0	0	0

15 October 2016
17:30

Connacht (Ireland)	23–21	(France) Toulouse (1 BP)
Try: Adeolokun 20' m O'Halloran 58' m Aki 66' c Con: Ronaldson (1/1) 66'; Pen: Carty (2/3) 25', 29'	Report	Try: David 34' m Doussain 37' c Con: Bézy (1/2) 37'; Pen: Bézy (2/4) 7', 11'; Fritz (1/1) 13'

The Sportsground
Attendance: 8,091
Referee: Luke Pearce (RFU)

23 October 2016
16:15

Zebre (Italy)	7–52	(Ireland) Connacht (1 BP)
Try: D'Apice 61' c Con: Padovani (1/1) 61'	Report	Try: Ili (3) 10' c, 41' c, 79' c Carty 13' c Penalty try 52' c Kelleher (2) 53' c, 74' m Carey 55' m Con: Ronaldson (6/8) 10', 13', 41', 52', 53', 79'

Stadio Sergio Lanfranchi
Attendance: 3,000
Referee: Mathieu Raynal (FFR)

11 December 2016
13:00

(1 BP) Wasps (England)	32–17	(Ireland) Connacht
Try: Beale 6' c Hughes 43' c Launchbury 62' c Bassett 72' m Con: Gopperth (3/4) 7', 44', 63'; Pen: Gopperth (2/2) 22', 35'	Report	Try: Marmion 24' c Parata 45' c Con: Carty (2/2) 25', 46'; Pen: Carty (1/3) 18'

Ricoh Arena
Attendance: 13,364
Referee: Alexandre Ruiz (FFR)

17 December 2016
17:30

Connacht (Ireland)	20–18	(England) Wasps
Try: Poolman 39' c Dawai 80' c Con: Carty (2/2) 40', 80'; Pen: Carty (2/3) 8', 31'	Report	Try: Simpson 13' c Bassett 72' m Con: Gopperth (1/2) 13'; Pen: Gopperth (2/3) 53', 67'

The Sportsground
Attendance: 8,090
Referee: Mathieu Raynal (FFR)
(for Jérôme Garcès (FFR))

Assistant referee Mathieu Raynal replaced the original referee Jérôme Garcès on the 73rd minute of the game after pulling a hamstring.

14 January 2017
13:00

(1 BP) Connacht (Ireland)	66–21	(Italy) Zebre
Try: Healy (2) 1' c, 41' c Cooney 18' c O'Halloran (2) 23' c, 43' c Bealham 27' c Marmion (2) 36' m, 54' c Ronaldson 39' c Blade 66' m Con: Cooney (8/10) 2', 19', 23', 29', 40', 42', 44', 55'	Report	Try: Meyer 6' c Ruzza 11' c Bellini 62' c Con: Canna (3/3) 7', 12', 62'

The Sportsground
Attendance: 5,607
Referee: Tom Foley (RFU)

22 January 2017
16:15

Toulouse (France)	19–10	(Ireland) Connacht
Try: Fickou 5' c Bonneval 17' c Tekori 46' m Con: Doussain (2/3) 6', 18'	Report	Try: Muldoon 53' c Con: Ronaldson (1/1) 54'; Pen: Ronaldson (1/2) 33'

Stadium Municipal
Attendance: 12,023
Referee: Wayne Barnes (RFU)

=== Champions Cup play-offs ===
==== Semi-final ====
20 May 2017
16:00 BST

Northampton Saints (England)	21–15	(Ireland) Connacht
Try: Mallinder 1' c Groom 56' m Con: Mallinder (1/2) 2'; Pen: Mallinder (3/3) 15', 23', 70'	Report	Try: Adeolokun 4' c Heffernan 61' m Con: Ronaldson (1/2) 4'; Pen: Ronaldson (1/1) 28'

Franklin's Gardens, Northampton
Referee: Mathieu Raynal (FFR)

FB	15	(Samoa) Ahsee Tuala		(substituted off) 78'
RW	14	(England) Ben Foden
OC	13	(Tonga) Nafi Tuitavake
IC	12	(England) Luther Burrell		(substituted off) 23'
LW	11	(Wales) George North
FH	10	(England) Harry Mallinder
SH	9	(South Africa) Nic Groom		(substituted off) 67'
N8	8	(France) Louis Picamoles
OF	7	(England) Teimana Harrison		(substituted off) 58'
BF	6	(England) Jamie Gibson	(yellow card) 78' to 80'
RL	5	(England) Christian Day		(substituted off) 64'
LL	4	(England) Courtney Lawes
TP	3	(England) Kieran Brookes		(substituted off) 62'
HK	2	(England) Dylan Hartley (c)		(substituted off) 59'
LP	1	(England) Alex Waller		(substituted off) 62'
Replacements:
HK	16	(England) Mike Haywood		(substituted on) 78'
PR	17	(Fiji) Campese Ma'afu		(substituted on) 62'
PR	18	(England) Gareth Denman		(substituted on) 62'
LK	19	(Fiji) Api Ratuniyarawa		(substituted on) 64'
FL	20	(England) Tom Wood		(substituted on) 58'
SH	21	(England) Lee Dickson		(substituted on) 67'
FH	22	(England) Sam Olver
CE	23	(Scotland) Rory Hutchinson		(substituted on) 23'
Coach:
(England) Jim Mallinder

FB	15	(Ireland) Tiernan O'Halloran
RW	14	(Ireland) Niyi Adeolokun
OC	13	(South Africa) Danie Poolman
IC	12	(Ireland) Craig Ronaldson
LW	11	(Ireland) Cian Kelleher	(substituted off) 3'
FH	10	(Ireland) Jack Carty
SH	9	(Ireland) Kieran Marmion	(substituted off) 66'
N8	8	(Ireland) John Muldoon (c)
OF	7	(New Zealand) Jake Heenan	(substituted off) 56'
BF	6	(Ireland) Seán O'Brien
RL	5	(England) James Cannon	(substituted off) 51'
LL	4	(Ireland) Quinn Roux
TP	3	(Ireland) Finlay Bealham	(substituted off) 68'
HK	2	(Ireland) Dave Heffernan
LP	1	(Ireland) Denis Buckley
Replacements:
HK	16	(Ireland) Shane Delahunt
PR	17	(Ireland) JP Cooney
PR	18	(Ireland) Conor Carey	(substituted on) 68'
LK	19	(Ireland) Ultan Dillane	(substituted on) 51'
FL	20	(Fiji) Naulia Dawai	(substituted on) 56'
SH	21	(Ireland) Caolin Blade
SH	22	(Ireland) John Cooney	(substituted on) 66'
WG	23	(Ireland) Matt Healy	(substituted on) 3'
Coach:
(Samoa) Pat Lam
