= List of 2016–17 Pro12 transfers =

This is a list of player transfers involving Pro12 teams before or during the 2016–17 season.

== Benetton Treviso ==
=== Players In ===
- (Italy) Andrea Buondonno from (Italy) Mogliano
- (Italy) David Odiete from (Italy) Mogliano
- (Ireland) Ian McKinley from (Italy) Viadana
- (Italy) Guglielmo Zanini from (Italy) Rovigo Delta
- (Italy) Giorgio Bronzini from (Italy) Rovigo Delta
- (Italy) Tito Tebaldi from (England) Harlequins
- (Italy) Nicola Quaglio from (Italy) Rovigo Delta
- (Fiji) Michael Tagicakibau from (Wales) Scarlets
- (Italy) Filippo Gerosa from (Italy) Viadana
- (Italy) Tiziano Pasquali from (England) Leicester Tigers
- (Italy) Tommaso Allan from (France) USA Perpignan
- (Italy) Tommaso Benvenuti from (England) Bristol Rugby
- (Italy) Federico Zani from (Italy) Mogliano
- (Italy) Luca Sperandio from (Italy) Mogliano

=== Players Out ===
- (Italy) Matteo Muccignat to (Italy) Rovigo Delta
- (Italy) Ludovico Nitoglia retired
- (Italy) Enrico Bacchin to (Italy) Petrarca Padova
- (Italy) Simone Ragusi to (Italy) Petrarca Padova
- (Italy) Alberto Lucchese retired
- (Australia) Salesi Manu to (Japan) Honda Heat
- (Italy) Andrea De Marchi to (Italy) Rovigo Delta
- (South Africa) Duncan Naude to (France) Limoges
- (New Zealand) Sam Christie to (New Zealand) Waikato
- (Italy) James Ambrosini to (Italy) Amatori San Donà
- (New Zealand) Chris Smylie to (New Zealand) North Harbour
- (England) Rupert Harden to (England) Richmond
- (England) Tom Palmer to (France) Bordeaux Begles

== Cardiff Blues ==
=== Players In ===
- (New Zealand) Nick Williams from (Ireland) Ulster
- (Wales) Matthew Morgan from (England) Bristol Rugby
- (Wales) Rhys Gill from (England) Saracens
- (Wales) Steven Shingler from (Wales) Scarlets
- (New Zealand) Willis Halaholo from (New Zealand) Hurricanes
- (Wales) Kirby Myhill from (Wales) Scarlets
- (South Africa) George Earle from (Wales) Scarlets

=== Players Out ===
- (Wales) Rhys Patchell to (Wales) Scarlets
- (Wales) Sam Hobbs to (Wales) Newport Gwent Dragons
- (Wales) Craig Mitchell to (Wales) Newport Gwent Dragons
- (Cyprus) Chris Dicomidis to (Wales) Pontypridd
- (Wales) Tom Williams to (Wales) Scarlets
- (England) Miles Normandale to (England) Rotherham Titans
- (Wales) Harry Davies to (England) Bath
- (Wales) Gavin Evans to (Wales) Neath RFC
- (Italy) Manoa Vosawai to (France) RC Vannes
- (Wales) Lou Reed to (England) Sale Sharks
- (Wales) Richard Smith to (Wales) Scarlets
- (Wales) Tom Isaacs to Hong Kong Football Club
- (Wales) Tom Davies to (Wales) Newport Gwent Dragons
- (Wales) Joe Jones to (France) USA Perpignan
- (Wales) Elis Wyn Benham to (Wales) Cardiff RFC
- (Wales) Gareth Davies to (Wales) Merthyr RFC
- (Wales) Tavis Knoyle to (Wales) Newport Gwent Dragons
- (Australia) Salesi Ma'afu to (England) Gloucester Rugby

== Connacht ==
=== Players In ===
- (Ireland) Eoin Griffin from (England) London Irish
- (Ireland) Conor Carey from (England) Nottingham
- (South Africa) Marnitz Boshoff from (South Africa) Lions
- (Ireland) Cian Kelleher from (Ireland) Leinster
- (New Zealand) Dominic Robertson-McCoy from (New Zealand) Northland
- Josh Rowland from Ireland Sevens
- (Ireland) Lewis Stevenson from (England) Exeter Chiefs
- (New Zealand) Stacey Ili from (New Zealand) Auckland
- (England) James Cannon from (England) Wasps
- (Ireland) Ivan Soroka from (Ireland) Clontarf
- (Fiji) Naulia Dawai from (New Zealand) Otago
- (Ireland) John Andress from (Ireland) Munster
- (Ireland) Tom Farrell from (England) Bedford Blues
- (Ireland) Steve Crosbie from (Ireland) Munster
- (Ireland) Peter McCabe from (Ireland) Munster (loan)

=== Players Out ===
- (Ireland) Rodney Ah You to (Ireland) Ulster
- (Ireland) Robbie Henshaw to (Ireland) Leinster
- (United States) AJ MacGinty to (England) Sale Sharks
- (England) Aly Muldowney to (France) Grenoble
- (New Zealand) Api Pewhairangi to (England) London Broncos
- (New Zealand) George Naoupu to (England) Harlequins
- (Ireland) Jason Harris-Wright to (England) London Irish
- (Ireland) Ian Porter to (Ireland) Banbridge
- (Ireland) Fionn Carr to (Ireland) Naas
- (Ireland) Conor Finn to (Ireland) Buccaneers
- (Ireland) Dave McSharry retired
- (Ireland) Nathan White retired

== Edinburgh ==
=== Players In ===
- (Scotland) Duncan Weir from (Scotland) Glasgow Warriors
- (Ireland) Rory Scholes from (Ireland) Ulster
- (Scotland) Glenn Bryce from (Scotland) Glasgow Warriors
- (Australia) Junior Rasolea from (Australia) Western Force
- (Scotland) Kevin Bryce from (Scotland) Glasgow Warriors
- (Scotland) Nick Beavon from (Scotland) Melrose RFC
- (Wales) Jason Tovey from (Wales) Newport Gwent Dragons
- (Australia) Alex Northam from (Australia) North Harbour Rays
- (Australia) Sasa Tofilau from (Scotland) Kirkcaldy RFC
- (Scotland) Lewis Carmichael from (Scotland) Melrose RFC
- (Tonga) Viliami Fihaki from (England) Sale Sharks
- Viliame Mata from Fiji Sevens

=== Players Out ===
- (Scotland) Matt Scott to (England) Gloucester Rugby
- (New Zealand) Mike Coman to (England) London Irish
- (New Zealand) Sam Beard to (Wales) Newport Gwent Dragons
- (Scotland) Greig Tonks to (England) London Irish
- (Ireland) John Andress to (Ireland) Munster
- (Scotland) Jack Cuthbert to (England) Jersey Reds
- (South Africa) Andries Strauss retired
- Nick McLennan to Scotland Sevens
- (Scotland) Grant Shiells to (England) London Scottish
- (Australia) Alex Toolis to (Australia) Melbourne Rebels
- (New Zealand) Jade Te Rure to (New Zealand) Manawatu

== Glasgow Warriors ==
=== Players In ===
- (New Zealand) Jarrod Firth from (New Zealand) Counties Manukau
- (New Zealand) Corey Flynn from (France) Toulouse
- (Italy) Leonardo Sarto from (Italy) Zebre
- (England) Rory Clegg from (France) Oyonnax
- (Fiji) Nemia Kenatale from (Romania) Farul Constanța
- (Namibia) Tjiuee Uanivi from (South Africa) Sharks
- (Canada) Djustice Sears-Duru from (Canada) Ontario Blues
- (New Zealand) Hagen Schulte from (New Zealand) Canterbury
- (United States) Langilangi Haupeakui from (United States) Sacramento Express

=== Players Out ===
- (Scotland) Duncan Weir to (Scotland) Edinburgh Rugby
- (Scotland) Glenn Bryce to (Scotland) Edinburgh Rugby
- (Scotland) Robbie Fergusson to (England) London Scottish
- (Scotland) Mike Blair retired
- (Scotland) James Eddie retired
- (Scotland) Kevin Bryce to (Scotland) Edinburgh Rugby
- (Fiji) Leone Nakarawa to (France) Racing 92
- (Scotland) Jason Hill to (England) Bedford Blues
- (Australia) Taqele Naiyaravoro to (Australia) NSW Waratahs
- (Scotland) Michael Cusack to (England) Yorkshire Carnegie
- (Scotland) Gregor Hunter to (Scotland) Gala RFC
- (Scotland) Fergus Scott to (Scotland) Currie RFC
- (Scotland) Will Bordill to (Scotland) Ayr RFC
- (Scotland) Tyrone Holmes to (England) Newcastle Falcons
- (Wales) Javan Sebastian to (Wales) Carmarthen Quins
- (Georgia (country)) Shalva Mamukashvili to (France) Montpellier
- (Fiji) Jerry Yanuyanutawa released

== Leinster ==
=== Players In ===
- (Ireland) Robbie Henshaw from (Ireland) Connacht
- (Ireland) Ian Nagle from (England) London Irish
- (New Zealand) Jamison Gibson-Park from (New Zealand) Hurricanes

=== Players Out ===
- (New Zealand) Ben Te'o to (England) Worcester Warriors
- (Ireland) Ian Madigan to (France) Bordeaux Begles
- (Ireland) Marty Moore to (England) Wasps
- (Ireland) Darragh Fanning retired
- (Ireland) Cian Kelleher to (Ireland) Connacht
- (Ireland) Tom Farrell to (England) Bedford Blues
- (England) Tom Denton to (England) Gloucester Rugby
- (Ireland) Isaac Boss to (New Zealand) Waikato
- (Ireland) Tadhg Beirne to (Wales) Scarlets
- (Ireland) Eoin Reddan retired
- (Ireland) Luke Fitzgerald retired
- (Ireland) Aaron Dundon retired
- Mick McGrath to Ireland Sevens
- (Ireland) Royce Burke-Flynn released
- (Ireland) Kevin McLaughlin retired
- (Ireland) Collie O'Shea to (Ireland) Munster
- (Ireland) Steve Crosbie to (New Zealand) Wanganui
- (Ireland) Tony Ryan released
- (Ireland) Niall Morris retired

== Munster ==
=== Players In ===
- (Ireland) Sammy Arnold from (Ireland) Ulster
- (Ireland) John Andress from (Scotland) Edinburgh Rugby
- (Ireland) Darren O'Shea from (England) Worcester Warriors
- (South Africa) Jean Kleyn from (South Africa) Stormers
- (South Africa) Jaco Taute from (South Africa) Stormers / Western Province
- (Ireland) Collie O'Shea from (Ireland) Leinster
- (Ireland) Steve Crosbie from (New Zealand) Wanganui
- (New Zealand) Rhys Marshall from (New Zealand) Chiefs
- (South Africa) Thomas du Toit from (South Africa) Sharks
- (South Africa) Jean Deysel from (South Africa) Sharks

=== Players Out ===
- (Ireland) Jordan Coghlan to (England) Nottingham
- (Ireland) Gearoid Lyons to (England) Nottingham
- (Ireland) Shane Buckley to (England) Nottingham
- (Ireland) Jack Cullen to (England) London Scottish
- (South Africa) BJ Botha to (France) Lyon
- (Ireland) Johnny Holland retired
- (Ireland) Denis Hurley to (Ireland) Dolphin RFC
- (South Africa) Gerhard van den Heever to (Japan) Yamaha Jubilo
- (Ireland) John Andress to (Ireland) Connacht
- (Ireland) Steve Crosbie to (Ireland) Connacht
- (Ireland) Peter McCabe to (Ireland) Connacht (loan)

== Newport Gwent Dragons ==
=== Players In ===
- (Wales) Sam Hobbs from (Wales) Cardiff Blues
- (New Zealand) Sam Beard from (Scotland) Edinburgh Rugby
- (Wales) Nick Macleod from (England) Sale Sharks
- (Wales) Craig Mitchell from (Wales) Cardiff Blues
- (South Africa) Patrick Howard from (England) Northampton Saints
- (Wales) Darran Harris from (England) Rotherham Titans
- (Wales) Tom Davies from (Wales) Cardiff Blues
- (Wales) Ashley Sweet from (Wales) Ebbw Vale
- (Wales) Tavis Knoyle from (Wales) Cardiff Blues

=== Players Out ===
- (Wales) Taulupe Faletau to (England) Bath Rugby
- (Wales) Matthew Pewtner retired
- (Wales) Hugh Gustafson to (Wales) Ospreys
- (Wales) Jason Tovey to (Scotland) Edinburgh Rugby
- (Wales) Andrew Coombs retired
- (Wales) Aled Brew to (England) Bath Rugby

== Ospreys ==
=== Players In ===
- (Wales) Rhodri Jones from (Wales) Scarlets
- (Wales) Hugh Gustafson from (Wales) Newport Gwent Dragons
- (New Zealand) Kieron Fonotia from (New Zealand) Crusaders
- (Wales) Bradley Davies from (England) Wasps

=== Players Out ===
- (Wales) Aaron Jarvis to (France) Clermont Auvergne
- (Wales) Kristian Phillips to (England) London Welsh
- (Wales) Marc Thomas to (England) Jersey Reds
- (Fiji) Ifereimi Boladau to (England) London Scottish
- (South Africa) Rynier Bernardo to (Wales) Scarlets
- (Wales) Ryan Bevington to (England) Bristol Rugby
- (Wales) Matthew Dwyer to (Wales) Merthyr RFC
- (Wales) Jordan Collier to (Wales) Neath RFC
- (Wales) Richard Fussell retired
- (Wales) Rhodri Hughes to (Wales) Swansea RFC
- (South Africa) JJ Engelbrecht released
- (Wales) Lloyd Evans released
- (Wales) Aled Jenkins released
- (Wales) Gareth Delve released

== Scarlets ==
=== Players In ===
- (Wales) Jonathan Davies from (France) Clermont Auvergne
- (Wales) Rhys Patchell from (Wales) Cardiff Blues
- (South Africa) Werner Kruger from (South Africa) Bulls
- (Wales) Jonathan Evans from (England) Bath Rugby
- (New Zealand) Johnny McNicholl from (New Zealand) Crusaders
- (Wales) Tom Williams from (Wales) Cardiff Blues
- (South Africa) Rynier Bernardo from (Wales) Ospreys
- (Ireland) Tadhg Beirne from (Ireland) Leinster
- (Wales) Richard Smith from (Wales) Cardiff Blues
- (Wales) Nicky Thomas from (England) Gloucester Rugby

=== Players Out ===
- (Wales) Rhodri Williams to (England) Bristol Rugby
- (Wales) Rhodri Jones to (Wales) Ospreys
- (Wales) Steven Shingler to (Wales) Cardiff Blues
- (Samoa) Maselino Paulino to (France) Lyon
- (South Africa) George Earle to (Wales) Cardiff Blues
- (Wales) Kirby Myhill to (Wales) Cardiff Blues
- (Wales) Jordan Williams to (England) Bristol Rugby
- (Wales) Harry Robinson retired
- (Wales) Kieran Hardy to (England) Jersey Reds
- (New Zealand) Regan King to (England) Jersey Reds
- (Fiji) Michael Tagicakibau to (Italy) Benetton Treviso
- (Wales) Josh Lewis to (Wales) Ebbw Vale
- (Wales) Ben Leung to (Wales) Cardiff RFC
- (Wales) Connor Lloyd to (Wales) Carmarthen Quins
- (Wales) Jack Jones to (Wales) Llanelli RFC
- (Wales) Torin Myhill to (Wales) Carmarthen Quins
- (New Zealand) Michael Collins to (New Zealand) Otago
- (Australia) Jack Payne to (Wales) Llanelli RFC
- (Wales) Phil John released

== Ulster ==
=== Players In ===
- (New Zealand) Charles Piutau from (England) Wasps
- (Ireland) Rodney Ah You from (Ireland) Connacht
- (England) Kieran Treadwell from (England) Harlequins
- (South Africa) Marcell Coetzee from (South Africa) Sharks
- (England) Brett Herron from (England) Bath Rugby
- (Ireland) Angus Lloyd from (Ireland) Trinity College Dublin
- (Georgia (country)) Anton Peikrishvili from (France) CA Brive

=== Players Out ===
- (New Zealand) Nick Williams to (Wales) Cardiff Blues
- (Ireland) Sammy Arnold to (Ireland) Munster
- (Ireland) Rory Scholes to (Scotland) Edinburgh Rugby
- (Ireland) Ian Humphreys retired
- (Ireland) Dan Tuohy to (England) Bristol Rugby
- (Ireland) Willie Faloon released
- (Ireland) Paul Jackson released
- (Ireland) Ruaidhri Murphy released
- (Ireland) Bronson Ross released
- (Ireland) Paul Rowley released
- (Ireland) Frank Taggart released
- (Australia) Sam Windsor released

== Zebre ==
=== Players In ===
- (Italy) Gabriele Di Giulio from (Italy) Calvisano
- (Italy) Mattia Bellini from (Italy) Petrarca Padova
- (Italy) Tommaso Castello from (Italy) Calvisano
- (Italy) Maxime Mbanda from (Italy) Calvisano
- Kurt Baker from New Zealand Sevens
- (Italy) Joshua Furno from (England) Newcastle Falcons
- (Italy) Carlo Festuccia from (England) Wasps
- (Italy) Giovanbattista Venditti from (England) Newcastle Falcons
- (South Africa) Lloyd Greeff from (South Africa) Golden Lions
- (South Africa) Derick Minnie from (South Africa) Golden Lions
- (South Africa) Bart le Roux from (South Africa) Leopards
- (South Africa) Carlo Engelbrecht from (South Africa) Blue Bulls
- (Argentina) Serafin Bordoli from (Argentina) Olivos Rugby Club
- (Samoa) Faialaga Afamasaga from (New Zealand) Northland

=== Players Out ===
- (Italy) Leonardo Sarto to (Scotland) Glasgow Warriors
- (Italy) Mirco Bergamasco to (United States) Sacramento Express
- (Italy) Filippo Ferrarini to (United States) Ohio Aviators
- (New Zealand) Mils Muliaina to (United States) San Diego Breakers
- (Italy) Marco Bortolami retired
- (Italy) Emiliano Caffini to (Italy) Fiamme Oro
- (Italy) Filippo Cristiano to (Italy) Fiamme Oro
- (Italy) Kelly Haimona to (New Zealand) Bay of Plenty
- (Italy) Giulio Toniolatti to (Italy) Lazio
- (South Africa) Jean Cook to (Japan) Kintetsu Liners
- (Italy) Michele Visentin to (Italy) Mogliano
- (Italy) Paul Derbyshire to (Italy) Amatori San Donà
- (Argentina) Emiliano Coria to (France) Nevers
- (Italy) Gonzalo Garcia to (France) Cahors
- (South Africa) Ulrich Beyers to (South Africa) Blue Bulls
- (Australia) Luke Burgess retired
- (Argentina) Bruno Mercanti to (Spain) Valladolid RAC

== See also ==
- List of 2016–17 Premiership Rugby transfers
- List of 2016–17 RFU Championship transfers
- List of 2016–17 Super Rugby transfers
- List of 2016–17 Top 14 transfers
