= 2017–18 Connacht Rugby season =

Connacht
- 2017–18 season
- Head coach: Kieran Keane
- Chief executive: Willie Ruane
- Captain: John Muldoon
- Pro14: 6th, Conference A
- Challenge Cup: Quarter-finals
- Top try scorer: League: Tiernan O'Halloran (6); All: Matt Healy (12)
- Top points scorer: League: Jack Carty (123); All: Jack Carty (179)
- Highest home attendance: 8,129 v Gloucester; 31 March 2018; 8,129 v Leinster; 28 April 2018
- Lowest home attendance: 3,879 v Worcester Warriors; 21 October 2017
- Average home attendance: 5,780
| Home colours | Away colours | Third colours |

The 2017–18 season was Irish provincial rugby union side Connacht Rugby's seventeenth season competing in the Pro14, and the team's twenty-second season as a professional side. It was Kieran Keane's first and only season in charge of the side.

Connacht finished sixth in their seven-team Pro14 conference. As well as playing in the Pro14, the team competed in the Challenge Cup in Europe. They finished first in their pool and advanced to the knockout stage as third seed overall, but were defeated at home by Gloucester in the quarter-finals. The second tier side the Connacht Eagles competed in the 2017–18 British and Irish Cup, finishing third in their pool.

== Background ==
=== Competition schedule ===
On 30 June 2017, BBC Wales reported that the two South African teams being dropped from the Super Rugby competition, the Cheetahs and Southern Kings, would be immediately added to Pro12. Their involvement was confirmed on 1 August 2017. The 14 teams were split into two conferences of seven, with each conference featuring two teams each from Ireland and Wales and one team each from Italy, Scotland and South Africa. Connacht were named in Conference A. It was announced that each team would play the other teams in their own conference twice and those in the other conference once. In addition, Connacht would have two additional derby games against Leinster and Ulster, the Irish provinces in Conference B.

Connacht were entered into the Challenge Cup in Europe, following a play-off defeat to Northampton Saints. The team was drawn in Pool 5 of the competition along with Brive, Worcester Warriors and Oyonnax.

=== Personnel changes ===
In February 2017, Connacht announced that New Zealander Kieran Keane, Chiefs attack coach, had signed a three-year contract to become their new head coach, replacing Pat Lam who moved to Bristol. Following Keane's appointment, existing forwards coach Jimmy Duffy signed an extension to his deal and academy manager Nigel Carolan was promoted to backs coach, leaving his post as head coach of the Ireland under-20s to take the role. In May 2017, Peter Wilkins joined from Edinburgh as defence coach.

Among the prominent departures from the first team squad were Irish international scrum-half John Cooney, who joined Ulster, long-serving prop Ronan Loughney, who retired, and former Springbok Marnitz Boshoff, who departed a year earlier than initially planned for personal reasons. Incoming players included Australian flanker Jarrad Butler and prop Peter McCabe, who had previously been on loan with the team. The team also agreed a deal to sign Fiji international Eroni Vasiteri, but the move was called off after he received a nine-week ban for gouging. All Blacks Sevens player Pita Ahki was signed as a replacement.

== Coaching and management team ==
Note: Flags indicate national union as has been defined under WR eligibility rules. Individuals may hold more than one non-WR nationality.

| Role | Name | Union |
|---|---|---|
| Chief executive | Willie Ruane | Ireland |
| Team manager | Tim Allnut | New Zealand |
| Head coach | Kieran Keane | New Zealand |
| Forwards Coach | Jimmy Duffy | Ireland |
| Backs Coach | Nigel Carolan | Ireland |
| Defence Coach | Peter Wilkins | England |
| Head Performance Analyst | Simon Kavanagh | Ireland |
| Head of Strength and Conditiong | David Howarth | Australia |
| Strength and conditioning Coach | Johnny O'Connor | Ireland |
| Academy manager | Eric Elwood | Ireland |
| Connacht Eagles Coach | Mossy Lawler | Ireland |

== Players ==
=== Senior playing squad ===
The Connacht senior squad for 2017–18 was:

Note: Flags indicate national union under World Rugby eligibility rules. Players may hold more than one non-World Rugby nationality.

| Player | Position | Union |
|---|---|---|
| Shane Delahunt | Hooker | Ireland |
| **Dave Heffernan** | Hooker | Ireland |
| Tom McCartney* | Hooker | New Zealand |
| Pat O'Toole | Hooker | Ireland |
| **Finlay Bealham** | Prop | Ireland |
| Denis Buckley | Prop | Ireland |
| Conor Carey | Prop | Ireland |
| JP Cooney | Prop | Ireland |
| Denis Coulson | Prop | Ireland |
| Peter McCabe | Prop | Ireland |
| Dominic Robertson-McCoy* | Prop | New Zealand |
| Andrew Browne | Lock | Ireland |
| James Cannon* | Lock | England |
| **Ultan Dillane** | Lock | Ireland |
| **Quinn Roux** | Lock | Ireland |
| Gavin Thornbury | Lock | Ireland |
| Jarrad Butler | Flanker | Australia |
| James Connolly | Flanker | Ireland |
| **Naulia Dawai** | Flanker | Fiji |
| Jake Heenan* | Flanker | New Zealand |
| Eoin McKeon | Flanker | Ireland |
| Seán O'Brien | Flanker | Ireland |
| Eoghan Masterson | Number 8 | Ireland |
| **John Muldoon** (c) | Number 8 | Ireland |

| Player | Position | Union |
|---|---|---|
| Caolin Blade | Scrum-half | Ireland |
| **Kieran Marmion** | Scrum-half | Ireland |
| Conor McKeon | Scrum-half | Ireland |
| James Mitchell* | Scrum-half | England |
| Jack Carty | Fly-half | Ireland |
| Steve Crosbie | Fly-half | Ireland |
| Andrew Deegan | Fly-half | Australia |
| Pita Ahki | Centre | New Zealand |
| **Bundee Aki** | Centre | Ireland |
| Tom Farrell | Centre | Ireland |
| Eoin Griffin | Centre | Ireland |
| Peter Robb | Centre | Ireland |
| Craig Ronaldson | Centre | Ireland |
| **Niyi Adeolokun** | Wing | Ireland |
| Cormac Brennan | Wing | Ireland |
| **Matt Healy** | Wing | Ireland |
| Stacey Ili | Wing | New Zealand |
| Rory Scholes | Wing | Ireland |
| Cian Kelleher | Fullback | Ireland |
| Darragh Leader | Fullback | Ireland |
| **Tiernan O'Halloran** | Fullback | Ireland |

- Senior 15's internationally capped players in **bold**
- Players qualified to play for Ireland on dual nationality or residency grounds*
- Irish Provinces are currently limited to four non-Irish eligible (NIE) players and one non-Irish qualified player (NIQ or "Project Player"). Connacht is exempted from this under a separate development arrangement.

=== Academy squad ===
The Connacht academy squad for 2017–18 was:

Note: Flags indicate national union under World Rugby eligibility rules. Players may hold more than one non-World Rugby nationality.

| Player | Position | Union |
|---|---|---|
| Matthew Burke (year 1) | Prop | Ireland |
| Conor Kenny (year 2) | Prop | Ireland |
| Conor Kyne (year 3) | Prop | Ireland |
| Conán O'Donnell (year 3) | Prop | Ireland |
| Peter Claffey (year 2) | Lock | Ireland |
| Cillian Gallagher (year 2) | Lock | Ireland |
| Harley Fox (year 1) | Flanker | Australia |
| Sean Masterson (year 1) | Flanker | Ireland |
| Paul Boyle (year 1) | Number 8 | Ireland |

| Player | Position | Union |
|---|---|---|
| Ryan Feehily (year 1) | Scrum-half | Ireland |
| Stephen Kerins (year 2) | Scrum-half | Ireland |
| Luke Carty (year 1) | Fly-half | Ireland |
| Kieran Joyce (year 1) | Centre | Ireland |
| Jordan Conroy (year 1) | Wing | Ireland |
| Colm de Buitléar (year 1) | Wing | Ireland |
| Adam Leavy (year 2) | Wing | Ireland |
| Matthew Byrne (year 2) | Fullback | Ireland |

== Senior team transfers ==
=== Players in ===
- HK (Ireland) Pat O'Toole promoted from academy
- PR (Ireland) Denis Coulson from (France) Grenoble
- PR (Ireland) Peter McCabe from (Ireland) Munster
- LK (Ireland) Gavin Thornbury from (New Zealand) Wanganui
- FL (Australia) Jarrad Butler from (Australia) Brumbies
- SH (Ireland) Conor McKeon promoted from academy
- SH (England) James Mitchell from (England) Sale Sharks
- FH (Australia) Andrew Deegan from (Australia) Waratahs
- CE (New Zealand) Pita Ahki from (New Zealand) Hurricanes
- WG (Ireland) Cormac Brennan promoted from academy
- WG (Ireland) Rory Scholes from (Scotland) Edinburgh

=== Players out ===
- PR (Ireland) Ronan Loughney retired
- PR (Ireland) Ivan Soroka to (Ireland) Clontarf
- LK (Ireland) Ben Marshall retired
- LK (Ireland) Danny Qualter to (England) Nottingham
- LK (Ireland) Lewis Stevenson to (Ireland) Bangor
- FL (New Zealand) Nepia Fox-Matamua to (New Zealand) Ponsonby
- FL (Ireland) Rory Moloney to (New Zealand) Thames Valley
- SH (Ireland) John Cooney to (Ireland) Ulster
- FH (South Africa) Marnitz Boshoff to (South Africa) Blue Bulls
- FH (Canada) Shane O'Leary to (England) Ealing Trailfinders
- CE (Ireland) Rory Parata to (New Zealand) Otago
- WG (South Africa) Danie Poolman to (Ireland) Buccaneers
- FB Josh Rowland to Ireland Sevens

== Playing kit ==
The official Connacht team and support staff kit supplier for the season was Australian manufacturer BLK sport, who had supplied the full range of apparel for all of Connacht Rugby's representative teams and support staff since 2013. Connacht's main shirt sponsors were Irish sporting retailer Intersport Elverys, in the second year of a three-year deal.

Connacht launched their new home kit for the season in July 2017, in the traditional green. The team launched new away and European kits in August 2017 during a pre-season friendly against former head coach Pat Lam's side Bristol, wearing the away kit in the first half and the European kit in the second half. The away kit was primarily cyan and white, with white shorts and socks, while the European kit was primarily blue and lime green, with blue shorts and lime green socks.

== Results ==
=== Pro14 ===
2017–18 Pro14 tables
Conference A
| | Team | P | W | D | L | PF | PA | PD | TF | TA | TBP | LBP | PTS |
| 1 | (Scotland) Glasgow Warriors (SF) | 21 | 15 | 1 | 5 | 614 | 366 | +248 | 81 | 38 | 12 | 2 | 76 |
| 2 | (Ireland) Munster (SF) | 21 | 13 | 1 | 7 | 568 | 361 | +207 | 78 | 42 | 10 | 5 | 69 |
| 3 | (South Africa) Cheetahs (QF) | 21 | 12 | 0 | 9 | 609 | 554 | +55 | 75 | 68 | 10 | 5 | 63 |
| 4 | (Wales) Cardiff Blues | 21 | 11 | 0 | 10 | 502 | 482 | +20 | 56 | 59 | 5 | 5 | 54 |
| 5 | (Wales) Ospreys | 21 | 9 | 0 | 12 | 390 | 487 | −97 | 44 | 60 | 5 | 3 | 44 |
| 6 | (Ireland) Connacht | 21 | 7 | 0 | 14 | 445 | 477 | −32 | 53 | 54 | 5 | 6 | 39 |
| 7 | (Italy) Zebre | 21 | 7 | 0 | 14 | 408 | 593 | –185 | 50 | 78 | 4 | 4 | 36 |
Conference B
| | Team | P | W | D | L | PF | PA | PD | TF | TA | TBP | LBP | PTS |
| 1 | (Ireland) Leinster (CH) | 21 | 14 | 1 | 6 | 601 | 374 | +227 | 83 | 46 | 10 | 2 | 70 |
| 2 | (Wales) Scarlets (RU) | 21 | 14 | 1 | 6 | 528 | 365 | +163 | 69 | 43 | 9 | 3 | 70 |
| 3 | (Scotland) Edinburgh (QF) | 21 | 15 | 0 | 6 | 494 | 375 | +119 | 62 | 44 | 7 | 1 | 68 |
| 4 | (Ireland) Ulster (PO) | 21 | 12 | 2 | 7 | 538 | 482 | +56 | 68 | 61 | 8 | 2 | 62 |
| 5 | (Italy) Benetton | 21 | 11 | 0 | 10 | 415 | 451 | −36 | 51 | 55 | 6 | 5 | 55 |
| 6 | (Wales) Dragons | 21 | 2 | 2 | 17 | 378 | 672 | −294 | 43 | 94 | 4 | 4 | 20 |
| 7 | (South Africa) Southern Kings | 21 | 1 | 0 | 20 | 378 | 829 | −451 | 48 | 119 | 4 | 3 | 11 |
If teams are level at any stage, tiebreakers are applied in the following order -: 1. number of matches won 2. the difference between points for and points against 3. the number of tries scored 4. the most points scored 5. the difference between tries for and tries against 6. the fewest red cards received 7. the fewest yellow cards received
Green background indicates teams that competed in the Pro14 play-offs, and also earned a place in the 2018–19 European Champions Cup (excluding South African teams who are ineligible); Blue background indicates teams outside the play-off places that earned a place in the 2018–19 European Champions Cup, including the winner of the play-off between the two fourth-ranked European teams in each conference Yellow background indicates the loser of the play-off between the two fourth-ranked European teams in each conference, that earned a place in the 2018–19 European Rugby Challenge Cup. Plain background indicates teams that earned a place in the 2018–19 European Rugby Challenge Cup. (CH) Champions. (RU) Runners-up. (SF) Losing semi-finalists. (QF) Losing quarter-finalists. (PO) Champions Cup play-off winners.

2 September 2017
19:35

| (1 BP) Connacht (Ireland) | 12–18 | (Scotland) Glasgow Warriors |
| Pen: J. Carty (4/4) 1', 19', 40', 60' | Report | Try: Price 47' c L. Jones 71' m Con: P. Horne (1/2) 48'; Pen: P. Horne (2/3) 11', 45' |

Galway Sportsgrounds
Attendance: 4,017
Referee: Ben Whitehouse (WRU)

9 September 2017
19:35

| (1 BP) Connacht (Ireland) | 32–10 | (South Africa) Southern Kings |
| Try: Farrell 14' c E. Masterson 33' c Dillane 40' c Leader 69' m Con: J. Carty (3/3) 15', 34', 40'; Pen: J. Carty (2/2) 26', 47' | Report | Try: B. Klaasen 31' m Pupuma 77' m |

Galway Sportsgrounds
Attendance: 5,104
Referee: Mike Adamson (SRU)

15 September 2017
19:30

| Dragons (Wales) | 21–8 | (Ireland) Connacht |
| Try: Amos 1' m Dee 18' c Con: Henson (1/2) 19'; Pen: Henson (3/4) 23', 27', 36' | Report | Try: Roux 52' m Pen: J. Carty (1/1) 6' |

Rodney Parade
Attendance: 5,069
Referee: Quinton Immelman (SARU)

23 September 2017
15:15

| (1 BP) Connacht (Ireland) | 15–17 | (Wales) Cardiff Blues |
| Try: Leader 59' m Delahunt 74' c Con: Leader (1/1) 75'; Pen: Ronaldson (1/1) 10' | Report | Try: Halaholo (2) 37' c, 77' c Con: Shingler (1/1) 38'; Evans (1/1) 79'; Pen: Shingler (1/1) 63' |

Galway Sportsgrounds
Attendance: 4,659
Referee: Marius Mitrea (FIR)

29 September 2017
19:35

| (1 BP) Scarlets (Wales) | 36–27 | (Ireland) Connacht |
| Try: McNicholl 7' c S. Evans 17' m Patchell 24' c Halfpenny 38' c Beirne 77' c Con: Halfpenny (4/5) 8', 26', 39', 79'; Pen: Halfpenny (1/2) 57' | Report | Try: J. Carty 9' c O'Halloran (2) 30' c, 73' m Kelleher 35' m Con: J. Carty (2/4) 10', 31'; Pen: J. Carty (1/2) 22' |

Parc y Scarlets
Attendance: 7,693
Referee: Nigel Owens (WRU)

6 October 2017
19:35

| Ulster (Ireland) | 16–8 | (Ireland) Connacht |
| Try: Stockdale 56' c Con: Cooney (1/1) 56'; Pen: Cooney (3/3) 28', 44', 53' | Report | Try: McCartney 35' m Pen: J. Carty (1/1) 49' |

Kingspan Stadium
Attendance: 14,363
Referee: Andrew Brace (IRFU)

27 October 2017
19:35

| Connacht (Ireland) | 20–16 | (Ireland) Munster (1 BP) |
| Try: O'Halloran 22' c Farrell 66' c Con: J. Carty (1/1) 22'; Ronaldson (1/1) 67'; Pen: J. Carty (2/3) 39', 50' | Report | Try: Zebo 3' c Con: Keatley (1/1) 4'; Pen: Keatley (2/2) 16', 30'; Hanrahan (1/1) 65' |

Galway Sportsgrounds
Attendance: 7,089
Referee: Nigel Owens (WRU)

4 November 2017
19:35

| Connacht (Ireland) | 23–15 | (South Africa) Cheetahs |
| Try: Adeolokun 12' c McCartney 48' c Con: Ronaldson (1/1) 13'; J. Carty (1/1) 49'; Pen: Ronaldson (2/3) 5', 29'; Crosbie (1/1) 73' | Report | Try: S. Venter 67' m Mapimpi 75' c Con: Zeilinga (1/2) 76'; Pen: Stapelberg (1/2) 40' |

Galway Sportsgrounds
Attendance: 6,012
Referee: Frank Murphy (IRFU)

24 November 2017
19:35

| Cardiff Blues (Wales) | 36–30 | (Ireland) Connacht (2 BP) |
| Try: Robinson 17' c Morgan 52' c Lane 60' c Con: Evans (1/1) 18'; Anscombe (2/2) 53', 61'; Pen: Evans (3/3) 15', 23', 37'; Anscombe (2/2) 73', 80' | Report | Try: Adeolokun 29' c Delahunt (2) 55' m, 70' m Muldoon 75' c Con: J. Carty (1/2) 30'; Crosbie (1/2) 76'; Pen: J. Carty (2/2) 12', 33' |

Cardiff Arms Park
Attendance: 5,042
Referee: Craig Evans (WRU)

2 December 2017
14:15

| Zebre (Italy) | 24–10 | (Ireland) Connacht |
| Try: Meyer 67' c Venditti 76' m Con: Canna (1/2) 68'; Pen: Canna (3/4) 10', 40', 61'; Drop: Canna (1/1) 74' | Report | Try: Farrell 43' c Con: Crosbie (1/1) 44'; Pen: J. Carty (1/2) 66' |

Stadio Sergio Lanfranchi
Attendance: 2,000
Referee: George Clancy (IRFU)

23 December 2017
19:35

| (1 BP) Connacht (Ireland) | 44–16 | (Ireland) Ulster |
| Try: E. Masterson 2' m Aki 7' c O'Halloran 24' m Dillane (2) 54' c, 75' c Butler 59' c Con: J. Carty (4/6) 8', 56', 61', 76'; Pen: J. Carty (2/2) 40', 47' | Report | Try: Gilroy 65' m Lyttle 79' m Pen: Cooney (2/2) 23', 32' |

Galway Sportsgrounds
Attendance: 7,629
Referee: Mike Adamson (SRU)

1 January 2018
15:15

| Leinster (Ireland) | 21–18 | (Ireland) Connacht (1 BP) |
| Try: Deegan 28' m L. McGrath 60' c Con: Sexton (1/2) 61'; Pen: Sexton (3/3) 6', 25', 49' | Report | Try: Bealham 38' c Healy 68' m Con: J. Carty (1/2) 39'; Pen: J. Carty (2/2) 1', 34' |

RDS Arena
Attendance: 17,112
Referee: Ben Whitehouse (WRU)

6 January 2018
19:45

| (1 BP) Munster (Ireland) | 39–13 | (Ireland) Connacht |
| Try: O'Shea 19' c Conway 53' c Earls 59' m Murray (2) 63' c, 69' c Con: Keatley (4/5) 20', 54', 64', 70'; Pen: Keatley (2/2) 30', 50' | Report | Try: McCartney 77' c Con: Ronaldson (1/1) 78'; Pen: J. Carty (2/2) 2', 24' |

Thomond Park
Attendance: 18,604
Referee: David Wilkinson (IRFU)

9 February 2018
19:35

| Connacht (Ireland) | 26–15 | (Wales) Ospreys |
| Try: E. Masterson 40' c Farrell 68' c Con: Ronaldson (2/2) 40', 69'; Pen: Ronaldson (4/5) 9', 23' 53', 75' | Report | Try: Howells 18' m Morgan-Williams 71' c Con: S. Davies (1/2) 72'; Pen: S. Davies (1/3) 62' |

Galway Sportsgrounds
Attendance: 5,242
Referee: Stuart Berry (SARU)

16 February 2018
19:35

| Connacht (Ireland) | 11–19 | (Italy) Zebre |
| Try: Leader 72' m Pen: Ronaldson (2/3) 16', 40' | Report | Try: Giammarioli 18' c Di Giulio 46' m De Marchi 64' c Con: Canna (2/3) 19', 65' |

Galway Sportsgrounds
Attendance: 5,400
Referee: Mike Adamson (SRU)

24 February 2018
12:00

| (1 BP) Benetton (Italy) | 19–22 | (Ireland) Connacht |
| Try: Tebaldi 35' c Ioane 58' m Fuser 80' c Con: Banks (2/3) 37', 80' | Report | Try: Bealham 43' m Butler 61' c Griffin 73' c Con: Carty (2/3) 62', 74'; Pen: Carty (1/2) 70' |

Stadio Comunale di Monigo
Attendance: 2,100
Referee: Lloyd Linton (SRU)

3 March 2018
17:35

| Cheetahs (South Africa) | 26–25 | (Ireland) Connacht (1 BP) |
| Try: Cassiem 3' c Maxwane 60' c Con: N. Marais (2/2) 4', 61'; Pen: N. Marais (4/5) 9', 17', 24', 79' | Report | Try: Healy (2) 14' c, 20' m Griffin 57' c Con: J. Carty (2/3) 15', 58'; Pen: J. Carty (2/3) 38', 42' |

Toyota Stadium
Attendance: 6,095
Referee: Stuart Berry (SARU)

23 March 2018
19:35

| (1 BP) Connacht (Ireland) | 22–29 | (Scotland) Edinburgh |
| Try: O'Halloran 11' c Farrell 16' c Bealham 65' m Con: J. Carty (2/2) 12', 17'; Pen: J. Carty (1/2) 39' | Report | Try: Fife 1' m Van der Merwe 22' m Weir 72' c Con: Weir (1/1) 73'; Pen: Van der Walt (1/1) 7'; Weir (3/3) 61', 70', 80' |

Galway Sportsgrounds
Attendance: 5,048
Referee: George Clancy (IRFU)

6 April 2018
19:35

| (1 BP) Ospreys (Wales) | 39–10 | (Ireland) Connacht |
| Try: Hassler 14' c Evans 26' c Otten 52' c Beck 60' c Dirksen 66' m Con: Biggar (4/5) 15', 27', 52', 61'; Pen: Biggar (2/2) 2', 9' | | Try: Ronaldson 21' c Con: Ronaldson (1/1) 22'; Pen: J. Carty (1/2) 39' |

Liberty Stadium
Attendance: 8,092
Referee: Ben Whitehouse (WRU)

13 April 2018
19:35

| (1 BP) Glasgow Warriors (Scotland) | 35–22 | (Ireland) Connacht |
| Try: Hogg 3' c Dunbar 26' c Brown 40' c Pyrgos 43' m Con: P. Horne (3/4) 4', 27', 40'; Pen: P. Horne (3/3) 7', 13', 21' | Report | Try: Bealham 1' m Blade 67' c Penalty try 75'; Con: J. Carty (1/2) 68'; Pen: J. Carty (1/1) 24' |

Scotstoun Stadium
Attendance: 7,351
Referee: Frank Murphy (IRFU)

28 April 2018
15:05

| (1 BP) Connacht (Ireland) | 47–10 | (Ireland) Leinster |
| Try: Adeolokun (2) 2' c, 41' m O'Halloran 28' c Marmion (2) 32' c, 49' c Aki 70' c Blade 75' c Con: J. Carty (4/5) 4', 28', 32', 50'; Ronaldson (1/1) 71'; Muldoon (1/1) 76' | Report | Try: B. Daly 53' c Con: Carbery (1/1) 54'; Pen: Carbery (1/2) 12' |

Galway Sportsgrounds
Attendance: 8,129
Referee: Andrew Brace (IRFU)

=== Challenge Cup ===
==== Pool 5 ====
| Pos | Team | Pld | W | D | L | PF | PA | PD | TF | TA | TB | LB | Pts |
|---|---|---|---|---|---|---|---|---|---|---|---|---|---|
| 1 | (Ireland) Connacht (3) | 6 | 5 | 1 | 0 | 225 | 102 | +123 | 29 | 15 | 4 | 0 | 26 |
| 2 | (France) Brive (7) | 6 | 3 | 0 | 3 | 161 | 162 | −1 | 23 | 19 | 4 | 1 | 17 |
| 3 | (England) Worcester Warriors | 6 | 2 | 1 | 3 | 124 | 133 | −9 | 16 | 17 | 3 | 2 | 15 |
| 4 | (France) Oyonnax | 6 | 1 | 0 | 5 | 102 | 215 | −113 | 11 | 28 | 0 | 0 | 4 |

Source: espn.co.uk

14 October 2017
20:00

| Oyonnax (France) | 15–43 | (Ireland) Connacht (1 BP) |
| Try: Tian 25' c Müller 30' m Con: Audy (1/2) 26'; Pen: Ruiz (1/1) 3' | Report | Try: Healy (2) 3' c, 51' c Kelleher 11' m McKeon 22' c Leader 79' m Con: Deegan (3/5) 4', 24', 52'; Pen: Deegan (4/4) 38', 44', 57', 61' |

Stade de Genève
Attendance: 3,500
Referee: Tom Foley (RFU)

21 October 2017
15:00

| Connacht (Ireland) | 15–8 | (England) Worcester Warriors (1 BP) |
| Try: E. Masterson 5' m Healy 57' c Con: J. Carty (1/2) 58'; Pen: J. Carty (1/1) 20' | Report | Try: Adams 51' m Pen: Lance (1/1) 74' |

Galway Sportsgrounds
Attendance: 3,879
Referee: Ian Davies (WRU)

9 December 2017
21:00

| (2 BP) Brive (France) | 31–38 | (Ireland) Connacht (1 BP) |
| Try: Tadjer (2) 15' c, 45' c Cazenave 24' c Brugnaut 28' m Namy 70' m Con: Germain (3/4) 16', 25', 47' | Report | Try: Dillane 31' c Marmion 39' c J. Carty 48' c Kelleher 61' m Con: J. Carty (3/4) 32', 40', 49'; Pen: J. Carty (4/4) 6', 43', 59', 67' |

Stade Amédée-Domenech
Attendance: 3,000
Referee: Craig Maxwell-Keys (RFU)

16 December 2017
15:00

| (1 BP) Connacht (Ireland) | 55–10 | (France) Brive |
| Try: Healy (4) 5' c, 49' c, 57' c, 69' c J. Carty 32' c Marmion 60' c Farrell 74' c Con: J. Carty (7/7) 6', 33', 50', 59', 61', 70', 75'; Pen: J. Carty (2/2) 12', 41' | Report | Try: Germain 29' c Con: Germain (1/1) 29'; Pen: Germain (1/1) 39' |

Galway Sportsgrounds
Attendance: 5,572
Referee: Ian Tempest (RFU)

13 January 2018
15:00

| (1 BP) Worcester Warriors (England) | 24–24 | (Ireland) Connacht |
| Try: Humphreys (2) 1' c, 22' m Lewis 4' m Adams 38' c Con: Pennell (2/3) 3', 40' | Report | Try: Muldoon 16' c Adeolokun 26' c O'Halloran 59' c Con: Ronaldson (3/3) 17', 26', 59'; Pen: Ronaldson (1/1) 53' |

Sixways Stadium
Attendance: 6,670
Referee: Alexandre Ruiz (FFR)

20 January 2018
14:30

| (1 BP) Connacht (Ireland) | 50–14 | (France) Oyonnax |
| Try: Adeolokun (3) 1' m, 3' c, 31' m Aki 10' c O'Halloran 19' m Healy 33' c Farrell 66' c Penalty try 75'; Con: Ronaldson (2/4) 3', 11'; O'Halloran (2/3) 34', 67' | Report | Try: Müller 16' c Ikpefan 39' c Con: Fuertes (1/1) 17'; Hall (1/1) 40' |

Galway Sportsgrounds
Attendance: 5,017
Referee: Craig Maxwell-Keys (RFU)

==== Pool winners and runners-up rankings ====
| Rank | Pool Leaders | Pts | Diff | TF |
|---|---|---|---|---|
| 1 | (France) Pau | 29 | +82 | 28 |
| 2 | (England) Newcastle Falcons | 28 | +107 | 33 |
| 3 | (Ireland) Connacht | 26 | +123 | 29 |
| 4 | (Scotland) Edinburgh | 25 | +184 | 40 |
| 5 | (Wales) Cardiff Blues | 21 | +4 | 12 |
| Rank | Pool Runners–up | Pts | Diff | TF |
| 6 | (England) Gloucester | 21 | +114 | 37 |
| 7 | (France) Brive | 17 | –1 | 23 |
| 8 | (France) Stade Français | 17 | –15 | 21 |
| 9 | (Wales) Dragons | 16 | +23 | 21 |
| 10 | (France) Toulouse | 14 | –3 | 14 |

==== Quarter-finals ====
31 March 2018
13:00

| Connacht (Ireland) (3) | 28–33 | (6) (England) Gloucester |
| Try: Marmion 7' m Aki 19' m Adeolokun 45' m Healy 70' c Con: Ronaldson (1/1) 71'; Pen: J. Carty (1/1) 49'; Ronaldson (1/1) 67' | Report | Try: Hanson 3' m Marshall 26' m Trinder 37' m Afoa 55' c Con: Williams (2/4) 38', 57'; Pen: Williams (2/2) 42', 63'; Twelvetrees (1/1) 77' |

Galway Sportsgrounds
Attendance: 8,129
Referee: Romain Poite (FFR)
