= Steve Crosby (disambiguation) =

Steve Crosby (born 1950) is an American former professional football coach and player.

Steve Crosby may also refer to:

- Steve Crosby (music), British record producer, songwriter and music manager

== See also ==
- Steve Crosbie (born 1993), Irish former rugby union player
- Stephen Crosby (1808–1869), American politician
