= Jordan Collier =

Jordan Collier may refer to:

- Jordan Collier (The 4400), a character in The 4400
- Jordan Collier (rugby union) (born 1994), Welsh rugby union player
