= Bill Tector =

- Full name: William Richard Tector
- Born: 16 April 1929 Clonroche, Wexford, Ireland
- Died: 28 April 1996 (aged 67) Dublin, Ireland
- School: Kilkenny College
- University: Trinity College Dublin
- Notable relative(s): Harry Tector (grandson); Jack Tector (grandson); Tim Tector (grandson); Craig Ronaldson (grandson)
- Occupation: Schoolteacher

Rugby union career
- Position: Fullback
International career
Years	Team	Apps	(Points)
1955	Ireland	3	(0)

William Richard Tector (16 April 1929 — 28 April 1996) was an Irish international rugby union player.

== Biography ==
Born in Clonroche, County Wexford, Tector was educated at Kilkenny College and Trinity College Dublin.

Tector led Kilkenny College to a Leinster Senior Cup title in field hockey and was Dublin University rugby captain for their centenary season in 1953–54. While playing his rugby with Wanderers, Tector achieved Ireland selection, making three appearances at fullback during the 1955 Five Nations. He was also a Leinster representative player.

A schoolteacher by profession, Tector was headmaster of Sandford Park School in Ranelagh, Dublin.

Tector's grandson Craig Ronaldson, a son of daughter Jackie, played fly-half for Connacht. One of his sons, Heatley, has fathered three cricketers, Harry, Jack and Tim, all of whom have represented Ireland at Under-19s level or higher.

== See also ==
- List of Ireland national rugby union players
