= Shane Delahunt =

Irish rugby union player (born 1994)

- Born: 2 February 1994 (age 32) Birr, Ireland
- Height: 1.88 m (6 ft 2 in)
- Weight: 111 kg (17 st 7 lb)
- School: Kilkenny College
- University: University College Dublin

Rugby union career
- Position(s): Hooker, Prop
- Current team: Connacht
Amateur team(s)
Years	Team	Apps	(Points)
–2012	Birr		
2012–2013	UCD		
2013–2014	Lansdowne		
2014–2023	Buccaneers		
Provincial / State sides
Years	Team	Apps	(Points)
2014–2023	Connacht	132	(65)
- Correct as of 7 July 2023
International career
Years	Team	Apps	(Points)
2014	Ireland U20	1	(0)
- Correct as of 1 February 2014

Shane Delahunt (born 2 February 1994) is a former professional rugby union player from Ireland. He primarily played as a hooker. Delahunt spent his entire professional career with Irish provincial side Connacht.

A product of the province's academy, Delahunt signed his first full contract with the side in December 2015, becoming a member of the senior squad in the 2016–17 season. He retired at the end of the 2022–23 season.

== Early life ==
Delahunt was born and raised in Birr, County Offaly. A graduate of Kilkenny College, Delahunt captained the college team in the Leinster Senior Cup in 2012. Delahunt also played GAA in his youth, playing primarily at full forward for club and county up to under-14 level.

== Rugby career ==
=== Early career ===
Playing prop in his teenage years, Delahunt was part of the Leinster under-age set up, captaining the province's under-19 side. At under-20 level, Delahunt was advised to change position to hooker due to competition in the prop positions and his own lack of size. During this adjustment Delahunt's progression stalled and he was primarily used as a replacement on the province's under-20 team. During his time in the Leinster youth set up, he was registered with University College Dublin team. Having been in the Leinster sub-academy for two years however, Delahunt did not progress to the academy. After this setback back Delahunt, still aiming to become a professional player, began playing for the Lansdowne under-20s, before contacting Nigel Carolan, academy coach at rival province Connacht and seeking a trial.

=== Connacht ===
Delahunt joined Connacht on an initial three-month trial in the summer of 2014. He trained with the team and played in a preseason friendly against Clermont Auvergne.

Despite only being a trial player, Delahunt featured for the senior team early in the 2014–15 season. With both Seán Henry and Jason Harris-Wright injured, Delahunt was an unused replacement for a 2014–15 Pro12 game against Leinster and the following week, on 24 September, he made his debut from the bench against Glasgow Warriors. In October 2014, Delahunt signed an academy contract with the side and later that week made his first start in a league game against Benetton Treviso. With the move to Connacht he also joined Buccaneers, an All-Ireland League side in the province. Delahunt made his European debut later that year, featuring as a replacement against Bayonne in the 2014–15 Challenge Cup on 13 December 2014. Including this European appearance, Delahunt made a total of nine appearances for the senior team over the course of the season.

In his second year in the academy, Delahunt again featured for the senior team. He started for Connacht on 28 November 2015 in their win over Munster, the province's first victory in Thomond Park since 1986. It was announced in December 2016 that Delahunt had signed a senior contract with the province which sees him become a full member of the first team squad in the 2016–17 season.

=== International ===
Delahunt has represented Ireland at under-age level. While playing prop as part of the Leinster under-age set up, he played for the Irish under-18 schools team and the Irish under-19s. Delahunt was part of the Ireland squad for the 2014 Six Nations Under 20s Championship . He made his only appearance for the team as a substitute in the game against Scotland on 31 January.
