= Cormac Brennan =

Irish rugby union player

- Born: Cormac Brennan; 21 February 1995 (age 31) Dublin, Ireland
- Height: 1.83 m (6 ft 0 in)
- Weight: 99 kg (15 st 8 lb)
- School: Cistercian College
- University: NUI Galway

Rugby union career
- Position: Utility back
Amateur team(s)
Years	Team	Apps	(Points)
2015–	Galwegians		
Senior career
Years	Team	Apps	(Points)
2017–2018	Connacht	0	(0)
International career
Years	Team	Apps	(Points)
2013	Ireland Schoolboys		

Cormac Brennan (born 2 February 1995) is a rugby union player from Ireland. He can play in a number of positions across the backline mainly in the back three, but also covering centre. Brennan currently plays for Irish Pro14 side Connacht, having come through the province's academy. He plays his club rugby for Galwegians.

== Early life ==
Brennan was born in Dublin, but was raised in Ballyvaughan in north County Clare from the age of five. In addition to rugby, he also played Gaelic football and hurling in his youth. Growing up in Clare, Brennan supported Munster Rugby, but played his rugby for Connacht club Galwegians from a young age, as it was the nearest team to where he lived. His father Padraig coached teams for the club at underage level.

Brennan attended Cistercian College in County Offaly, and played for the school in the Leinster Senior Cup in 2011, 2012 and 2013. His performances in the Schools Cup saw him involved with Leinster's youth system from under-18 to under-20 level. Brennan received his third level education from NUI Galway, which he began attending after joining the Connacht academy in 2015.

== Rugby career ==
=== Connacht ===
Brennan was announced as one of the new recruits to Nigel Carolan's Connacht academy ahead of the 2015–16 season. The move to the Connacht academy also saw him rejoin Galwegians at senior level, having played youth rugby for the club. In his first season in the academy, Brennan featured regularly for Galwegians in the All-Ireland League and also played for the Connacht Eagles, the province's second tier side. He began training with the first team and was named in a senior squad for the first time for the 2015–16 Pro12 game against Ulster on 1 April 2016. Brennan was one of four academy players who trained with Connacht during the season without getting capped for the senior team. When the team qualified for the Pro12 final however, the rest of the squad paid to bring the four to the game in Edinburgh in recognition of their contribution.

Brennan played his first game for the senior team in a pre-season friendly against Montpellier on 11 August 2016. During the regular season however, Brennan suffered a long-term injury. Despite only being in his second year of the three-year academy program, it was announced in May 2017 that Brennan had signed a senior contract for the 2017–18 season.

=== International ===
Brennan has represented Ireland at under-age level. He played for the Ireland under-18 schools team in 2013 on the back of his performances for Cistercian College in the Leinster Senior Cup.
