= Tom Davies (rugby union, born 1993) =

Welsh rugby union player

- Born: Thomas Davies; 10 March 1993 (age 33) Pontypridd
- Height: 188 cm (6 ft 2 in)
- Weight: 110 kg (17 st 5 lb; 243 lb)

Rugby union career
- Position: prop
- Current team: Dragons
Senior career
Years	Team	Apps	(Points)
2016-	Dragons	34	(0)
- Correct as of 28 May 2018
International career
Years	Team	Apps	(Points)
2012-13	Wales U20	1	(0)
- Correct as of 21 Apr 2017

Tom Davies (born 10 March 1993) is a Welsh rugby union player who plays as a prop forward. Davies played for Cardiff Blues under 18's before joining the Dragons in July 2016. He is a Wales under-20 international. He was released by the Dragons regional team at the end of the 2017-18 season.
