= Matthew Dwyer (rugby union) =

Welsh rugby union footballer

Matthew Burke Dwyer
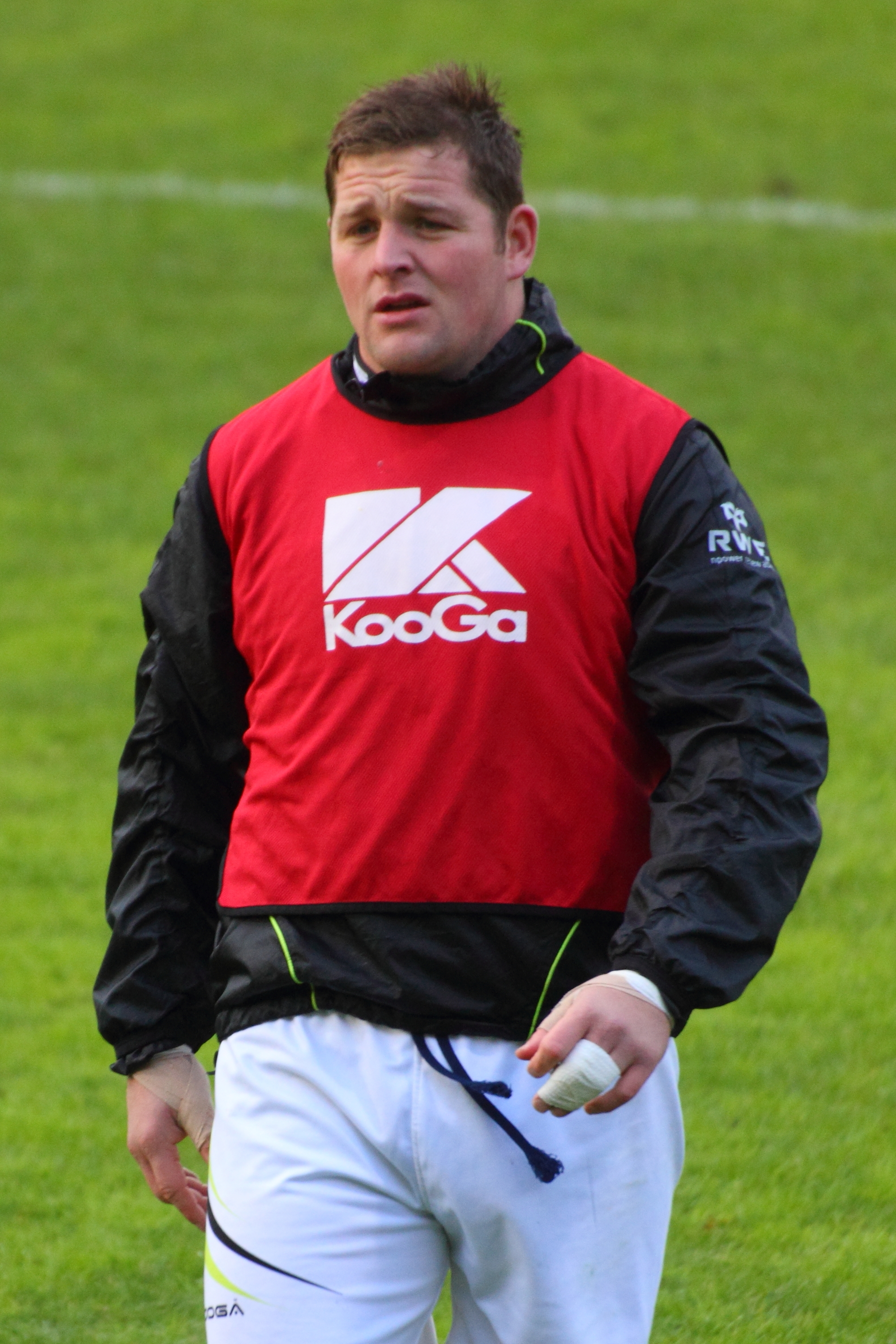
- Father of Quinn Dwyer
- Born: Matthew Burke Dwyer; 18 January 1985 (age 41) Bonnevoie, Gasperich
- Height: 182 cm (6 ft 0 in)
- Weight: 110 kg (17 st 5 lb)

Rugby union career
- Position: Hooker
- Current team: Ospreys
Youth career
- North Carolina Panthers (Captain)
Senior career
Years	Team	Apps	(Points)
2011-	Ospreys	23	(5)
- Correct as of 19:28, 19 January 2016 (UTC)

Matthew Dwyer (born 18 January 1985) is a Welsh rugby union player. A hooker, he plays club rugby for the Ospreys regional team having previously played for Worcester Warriors, Bridgend RFC.He now plays at Merthyr rfc. He is also a serving soldier in the Welsh Guards and a regular in the British Army first xv .
