= George Earle (rugby union) =

South African rugby union footballer

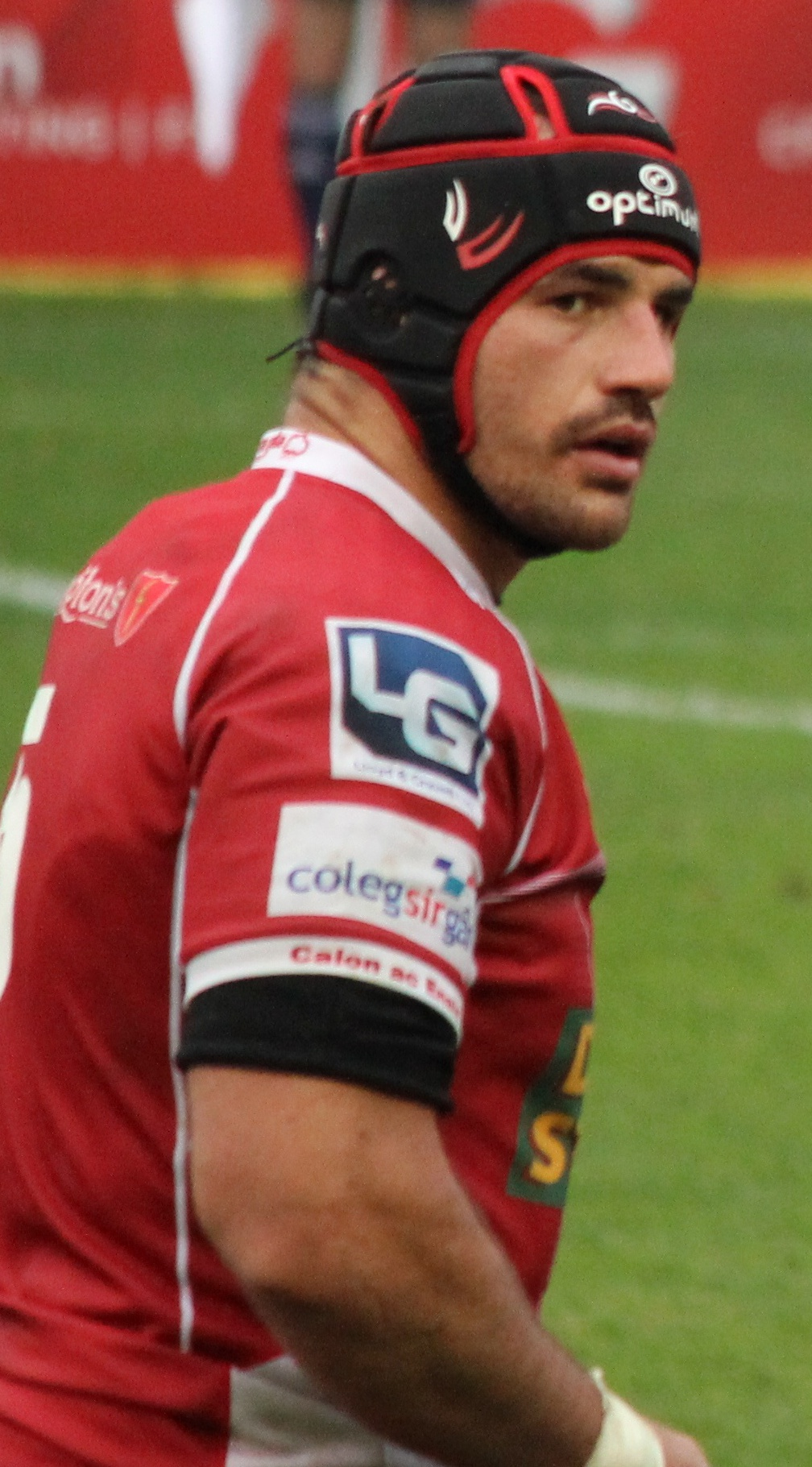
- Earle playing at the Heineken Cup 2013-14
- Born: George Earle; 9 January 1987 (age 39) Durban, South Africa
- Height: 197 cm (6 ft 6 in)
- Weight: 110 kg (17 st 5 lb; 243 lb)
- School: Westville Boys' High School
- University: UNISA

Rugby union career
- Position: Lock
Provincial / State sides
Years	Team	Apps	(Points)
2008–2009	W. Province	11	(0)
2009	Boland	6	(0)
2010–2011	Golden Lions	24	(5)
2011–2012	Griquas	2	(0)
2012–2016	Scarlets	91	(5)
2016–2019	Cardiff Blues	69	(5)
2019-	Colomiers	12	(0)
- Correct as of 21 May 2020
Super Rugby
Years	Team	Apps	(Points)
2010–2011	Lions	8	(0)
2012	Cheetahs	12	(0)
- Correct as of 16 July 2012

George Earle (born 9 January 1987) is a South African rugby union footballer. His regular playing position is lock.

== Career ==
Earle represented the Cheetahs in Super Rugby and the Griquas in the Currie Cup having previously played for Western Province, Boland Cavaliers and the Golden Lions. In May 2012 he signed for the Welsh regional team the Scarlets for the 2012–2013 season.

In 2016, Earle received an 8-week ban, following a red card for 'making contact with [the] eye' playing Bath in the European Rugby Challenge Cup. Earle appealed the ban, but the committee upheld it.

On 7 April 2016, Earle signed for Pro 14 rivals Cardiff Blues ahead of the 2016–17 season. He subsequently signed a new deal to stay with Cardiff until the end of the 2018–19 season.

On 6 May 2019, Earle left Cardiff to sign for Pro D2 side Colomiers in France ahead of the 2019–20 season.
