= Rory Moloney =

- Born: 4 January 1995 (age 31) Portlaoise, Ireland
- Height: 1.85 m (6 ft 1 in)
- Weight: 95 kg (14 st 13 lb)
- School: Cistercian College
- University: NUI Galway

Rugby union career
- Position: Flanker
- Current team: Thames Valley
Amateur team(s)
Years	Team	Apps	(Points)
- Portlaoise
- Buccaneers
2017–	Thames Valley		
Provincial / State sides
Years	Team	Apps	(Points)
2016–2017	Connacht	0	(0)
International career
Years	Team	Apps	(Points)
2012–2013	Ireland Schools		
2014–2015	Ireland U20	13	(5)

Rory Moloney (born 4 January 1995) is a rugby union player from Ireland. He plays as a flanker. Moloney most recently played professionally for Irish provincial side Connacht.

== Early life ==
Moloney was born in Portlaoise and grew up in Abbeyleix in County Laois. He started playing rugby with the Portlaoise team at 8 years old. In his youth, he also played Gaelic football with Ballyroan and hurling with Abbeyleix, but gave them up to focus on rugby.

Moloney received his secondary education from Cistercian College in Roscrea and played for the school's rugby team. Moloney has also studied at NUI Galway.

== Rugby career ==
=== Connacht ===
Having previously played for his native province Leinster's under-age sides, Moloney joined rival province Connacht's academy in 2013. Moloney was called up to train with the senior side, and though he did not feature for the team, he played a leading role in the province's second tier side the Connacht Eagles in both their inter-provincial and British and Irish Cup campaigns. Moloney signed his first senior contract with Connacht ahead of the 2016–17 season.

=== International ===
Moloney has represented Ireland internationally at under-age level. He played for the Irish schools team from 2012 to 2013, while attending Cistercian College. Moloney has also played for the Ireland under-20s. He appeared 13 times for the side, 10 of these appearances coming as starts, and scored a try against Italy in the 2015 under-20 Six Nations.
