= Eoin Griffin =

Irish rugby union player

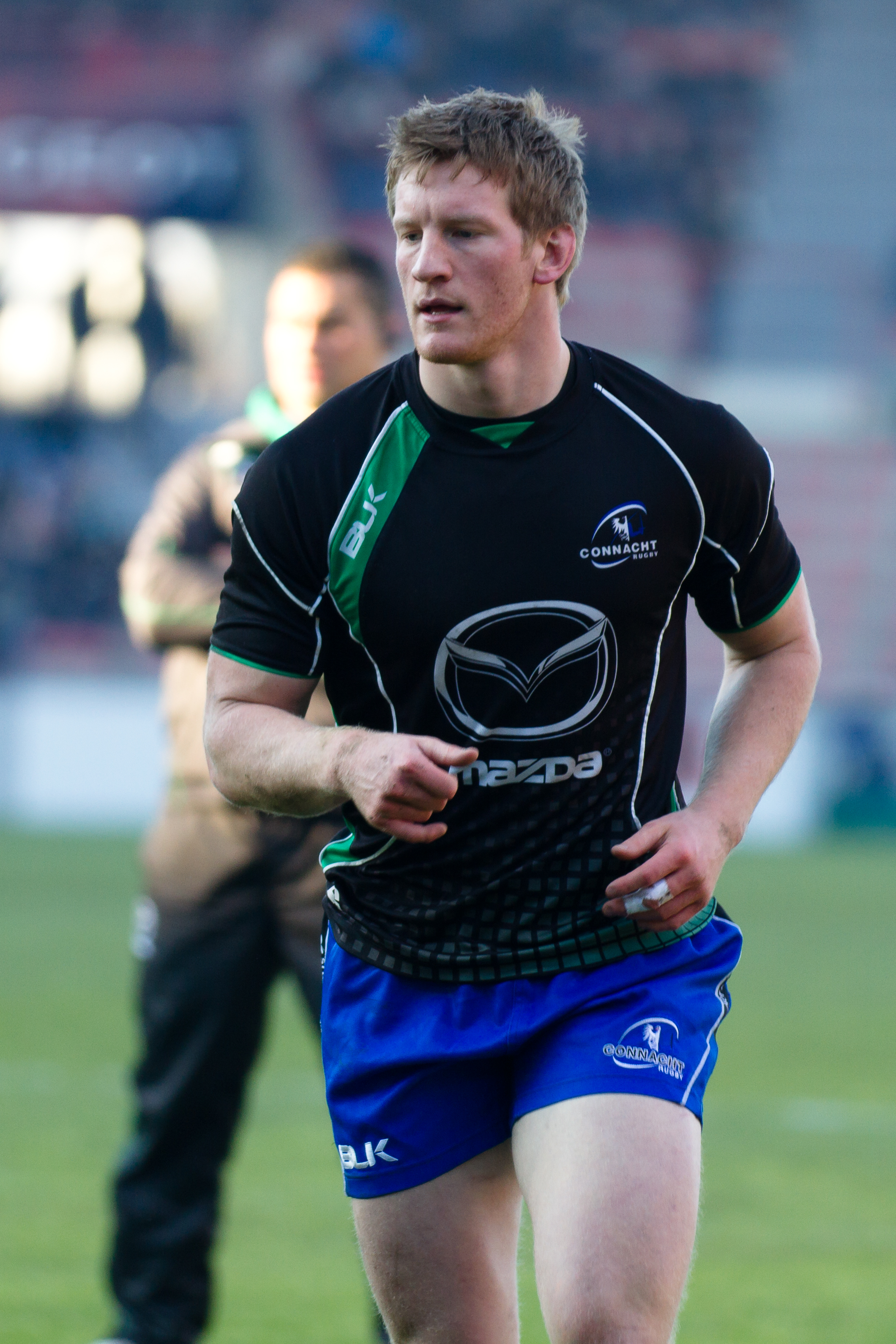
- Born: 18 September 1990 (age 36) Galway, Ireland
- Height: 1.86 m (6 ft 1 in)
- Weight: 95.5 kg (211 lb)
- School: Coláiste Iognáid
- University: NUI Galway

Rugby union career
- Position: Centre
- Current team: Connacht
Amateur team(s)
Years	Team	Apps	(Points)
- Galway Corinthians
Senior career
Years	Team	Apps	(Points)
2010–2014	Connacht	70	(20)
2014–2016	London Irish	23	(5)
2016–2019	Connacht	30	(10)
- Correct as of 1 January 2021
International career
Years	Team	Apps	(Points)
2010	Ireland U20	9	(15)
2013–2015	Emerging Ireland	9	(5)
- Correct as of 21 June 2015

Eoin Griffin (Irish name: Eoghan Ó Griofa; born 18 September 1990) is a former professional rugby union player from Ireland. He primarily played as a centre, and played both outside and inside channels. Griffin last played for Connacht in the Pro14.

Griffin came through Connacht's academy and played for the senior side from 2009 to 2014, before moving to London Irish. After two seasons with the exiles, he returned to Connacht ahead of the 2016–17 season. Griffin has represented his country at under-age level and was part of the Ireland under-20 team which captured the 2009 Under-20 Six Nations.

== Early life ==
Griffin was raised in Barna, County Galway. During his youth, he also played soccer with Salthill Devon and Gaelic football with Salthill-Knocknacarra, before settling on rugby, which he played with Corinthians. His first taste of sporting success came when Corinthians team achieved an Under 14 League/Cup double, which former playerJohnny O'Connor had also achieved when he played for the club. Griffin later won u15 cup while he won the u16 and u17 league with Corinthians during a successful period with the club.

Griffin was educated at Coláiste Iognáid, where he lost the Connacht Schools Junior Cup to Garbally College after having to overcome the Bish in the semi-final. Shortly after this defeat, the young Griffin suffered the first setback of his rapidly progressing career, tearing his cruciate ligament. Overcoming this he went on to become a two-time winner of the Connacht Schools Senior Cup.

He has studied at NUI Galway.

== Professional club career ==
=== Connacht ===
Griffin first played professionally for the Irish provincial team Connacht, based in his hometown of Galway and was first called into the squad against Olympus Madrid. Griffin scored a try on his first competitive start for the province in their defeat to the Llanelli Scarlets on 25 April 2010. He played seven times in 2010–11 Celtic League, scoring one try, and made an appearance in the 2010–11 European Challenge Cup against Bayonne. Griffin was also man of the match in Connacht's 26–22 win over Samoa on 9 November 2010.

In March 2011, it was announced that Griffin had signed a two-year deal with the province and would be part of the first team squad for the coming season. Connacht played in the Heineken Cup for the first time in the 2011–12 competition, with Griffin playing in three of the province's six games. He started in the away match with Harlequins, the home match with Toulouse and the away match against Gloucester. He also made 11 starts and four substitute appearances in that year's league.

In the following season, Griffin continued to be a regular part of the first team, making 16 appearances in the 2012–13 league, starting all but one of these games. Connacht featured in the top European competition again that season, with Griffin playing four times in the 2012–13 Heineken Cup. In the 2013–14 season, he played 19 times in the league and four times in the Heineken Cup. Following rumours that would join Munster, it was announced in February 2014 that Griffin had signed for English Premiership side London Irish and would leave at the end of the season. He made a total of 71 appearances in his first spell with Connacht.

=== London Irish ===
After three senior seasons with Connacht, Griffin joined London Irish on a two-year contract in summer 2014. He made his first appearance on 19 October 2014 when he started against Italian side Rovigo Delta in the 2014–15 Challenge Cup, and scored a try on his debut as Irish won 70–14. He made his Premiership debut on 15 November 2014 against Sale Sharks. Griffin made a total of 12 Premiership appearances and five Challenge Cup appearances in his first season. He also started in all four of London Irish's games in the 2014–15 Anglo-Welsh Cup.

In his second season, Griffin struggled for game time due to injury. He appeared in three games in the 2015–16 Premiership, but did not feature in the Anglo-Welsh or Challenge Cups. At the end of the season, London Irish were relegated to the Championship. Griffin left the club at the conclusion of his contract, having played 24 times for the side in his two seasons.

=== Return to Connacht ===
It was announced in December 2015 that Griffin had agreed to rejoin Connacht on a two-year deal ahead of the 2016–17 season. He made his return debut in the opening game of the season against Glasgow Warriors. As in the previous year, Griffin missed much of the season due to injury. He made just seven appearances in his first season back with the team, all of them coming in the league.

== International representation ==
On the back of his performances in both successful Connacht Schools Cup campaigns he was capped for Ireland Youths and the Ireland under-20s, with whom he won the 2009 Under-20 Six Nations. In the summer of 2013 Griffin was a member of the Emerging Ireland squad that participated in the 2013 IRB Tbilisi Cup held in Georgia. He played in three games, starting two of them.
