= Jordan Collier (rugby union) =

- Born: Jordan Collier; 7 December 1994 (age 31)
- Height: 188 cm (6 ft 2 in)
- Weight: 100 kg (15 st 10 lb; 220 lb)
- School: Neath Port Talbot College

Rugby union career
- Position: Flanker
- Current team: Ospreys
Senior career
Years	Team	Apps	(Points)
2014-	Ospreys	2	(0)
- Correct as of 21:08, 11 October 2015 (UTC)

Jordan Collier (born 7 December 1994) is a Welsh rugby union player who plays for Ospreys regional team as a flanker.

Collier made his debut for the Ospreys regional team in 2014 having previously played for the Neath RFC and Tonmawr RFC.
