= Kieran Keane =

New Zealand rugby union coach and player

- Born: Kieran James Keane; 9 February 1954 (age 72) Christchurch, New Zealand
- Height: 1.73 m (5 ft 8 in)
- Weight: 75 kg (165 lb)
- School: St Bede's College
- Occupation: Rugby Union Coach

Rugby union career
- Position: Second five-eighth
Provincial / State sides
Years	Team	Apps	(Points)
1977–85	Canterbury	64	
International career
Years	Team	Apps	(Points)
1979	New Zealand	0	(0)
Coaching career
- Years: Team
- 1998–2001, 2006: Marlborough
- 2002–04: Hawke's Bay
- 2009–16: Tasman
- 2016–17: Chiefs (Assistant)
- 2017–2018: Connacht
- 2019-: North Harbour

Kieran James Keane (born 9 February 1954) is a New Zealand rugby union coach and former rugby union player. A second five-eighth, Keane represented Canterbury at a provincial level, and was a member of the New Zealand national side, the All Blacks, in 1979. He played six matches for the All Blacks but did not appear in any official internationals.

On 20 February 2017, it was announced that Keane will be the new head coach of Connacht Rugby, taking over once Pat Lam leaves in June 2017. On 30 April 2018, it was announced that Keane would be leaving Connacht at the end of the season after one year in charge.
