= Andrea Buondonno =

- Born: 21 November 1992 (age 33) Milan
- Height: 1.85 m (6 ft 1 in)
- Weight: 94 kg (207 lb; 14 st 11 lb)

Rugby union career
- Position: Wing
- Current team: Lyons Piacenza
Youth career
- Amatori Rugby Milano
- –: F.I.R. Academy
Senior career
Years	Team	Apps	(Points)
2009–2010	Amatori Milano		
2010–2011	Crociati Parma		
2011–2014	Lyons Piacenza		
2014–2015	Viadana	17	(30)
2015–2016	Mogliano	17	(25)
2016–2017	Treviso	11	(7)
2017−2018	Mogliano	8	(51)
2018–2021	Verona	29	(23)
2021–2022	Colorno	13	(76)
2022–	Lyons Piacenza		
International career
Years	Team	Apps	(Points)
2013−2015	Italy Seven	22	(15)
- Correct as of 26 June 2016

Andrea Buondonno (born 21 November 1992) is an Italian rugby union player. He plays on the wing, as of July 2022 for Lyons Piacenza in Top10.

From 2016 to 2017, he played with Treviso in Pro12. For 2021-2022 season he came back in Top10 with Colorno.

He was named to the Italy Seven squad from 2013 to 2015.
