= Conor Carey =

English rugby union player (born 1991)

- Born: 26 September 1991 (age 35) Ealing, England
- Height: 1.83 m (6 ft 0 in)
- Weight: 122 kg (19 st 3 lb)
- School: Methodist College

Rugby union career
- Position: Tighthead Prop
- Current team: Northampton Saints
Amateur team(s)
Years	Team	Apps	(Points)
- Ballymena
–	Ballynahinch		
Senior career
Years	Team	Apps	(Points)
2013–2014	Ealing Trailfinders	23	(0)
2014–2016	Nottingham	43	(10)
2016–2019	Connacht	54	(5)
2019–2021	Worcester Warriors	15	(0)
2021	Perpignan		
2021-	Northampton Saints	0	(0)
- Correct as of 26 Oct 2021
International career
Years	Team	Apps	(Points)
2011	Ireland U20	6	(0)
- Correct as of 30 June 2011

Conor Carey (born 26 September 1991) is an English-born Irish professional rugby union player. He primarily plays as a prop. Carey currently plays for English Premiership side Northampton Saints. He previously played for Irish provincial side Connacht in the Pro14, and before that played for Nottingham and Ealing Trailfinders in the English Championship. Raised in Belfast, Carey started his career playing under-age rugby with Ulster and represented Ireland internationally up to under-20 level.

== Early life ==
Carey was born in Ealing in London. He was raised in the area for two years, before his parents moved to Hong Kong, and then Wales before eventually settling in Belfast, Northern Ireland.

Carey attended Methodist College in Belfast. He played for the school's rugby side and was part of the team that won the Ulster Schools' Cup in 2008 and 2009. Carey played club rugby with Ballymena in his youth, but also played for Ballynahinch in the All-Ireland League, winning Division 1B with the team in 2013.

Carey was also part of the Ulster youth set up. He played for the province at under-18, under-19 and under-20 levels, spending three years in the province's system.

== Club career ==
=== Ealing Trailfinders ===
Having failed to make an appearance for the Ulster senior team, Carey joined English Championship side Ealing Trailfinders in 2013, having been born in Ealing and lived there for two years. The team had been promoted from the National League 1 in the previous season. Carey was named as a replacement for the opening game of the season against London Scottish, making his debut from the bench after 58 minutes. He made a total of 23 appearances for the Trailfinders during the course of the season, but Ealing finished bottom of the 2013–14 Championship and were relegated back to National League 1.

=== Nottingham ===
Despite Ealing's relegation, Carey impressed enough to earn a move to Nottingham. Carey made his debut on the opening day of the 2014–15 Championship, coming on as a replacement against Bedford Blues after 75 minutes. He went on to feature in all 22 of Nottingham's Championship matches for the season, starting 17 of these.

=== Connacht ===
It was announced in March 2016 that Carey had signed a deal with Irish provincial side Connacht and would join them ahead of the 2016–17 season. He was signed as a replacement for outgoing Irish international, Rodney Ah You. He played regularly in the early part of the season, starting six games in the 2016–17 Pro12 and playing in all of the side's games in the Champions Cup, before suffering a serious injury against Wasps in December 2016. Carey returned from injury in May 2017 for the final game of the season against Munster.

Carey continued to play regularly in his second season, being primarily used as a replacement for Finlay Bealham. He featured in 18 of Connacht's 21 games in the 2017–18 Pro14 and all seven games in the Challenge Cup. In December 2017, it was announced that Carey had signed an extension to his contract. In the 2018–19 season, he played 13 games in the Pro14 and four games in the Challenge Cup. In February 2019, it was announced that Carey would leave Connacht at the end of the 2018–19 season. He made a total of 54 competitive appearances in his three seasons with the team.

=== Worcester Warriors ===
In February 2019, it was announced that Carey had signed for the Worcester Warriors. He joined the club ahead of the 2019–20 season.

=== Perpignan ===
On 14 August 2021, Carey travels to France to join Perpignan in the Top 14 competition ahead of the 2021–22 season.

=== Northampton Saints ===
On 26 October 2021, Northampton Saints announced Cary would join them for the rest of the season.

== International career ==
Carey has represented Ireland at under-age international level. He was capped at under-18 and under-19 level, before being named in the Ireland under-20 squad for the 2011 Six Nations Under 20s Championship. Carey made his debut as a replacement against Italy on 4 February 2011, and started the following week against France.
