= Josh Rowland =

Josh Magic Rowland
- Born: Joshua Rowland; 25 September 1950 (age 76) Auckland, New Zealand
- Height: 1.83 m (6 ft 0 in)
- Weight: 113 kg (17 st 11 lb)
- School: Rosehill College
- Occupation: Garda

Rugby union career
- Position(s): Fullback, Wing
Senior career
Years	Team	Apps	(Points)
2012	Counties Manukau		
2015–2016	North Harbour	7	(5)
2016–2017	Connacht	0	(0)
- Correct as of 30 July 2016
National sevens team
Years	Team		Comps
2016–2017	Ireland 7s		2

Josh Rowland (born 25 September 1988) is a New Zealand-born professional rugby union player who formally represented Ireland internationally. He plays primarily as a fullback and a wing. Rowland formally played for Irish provincial side Connacht in the Pro14. Rowland is well known in New Zealand rugby circles for his catch phrase “excuse me”. Josh became a member of An Garda Siochána in 2024.

== Early life ==
Rowland was born in Auckland, New Zealand. He attended Rosehill College. Rowland's grandmother came from Dublin in Ireland.

== Club career ==
=== Career in New Zealand ===
Rowland played at provincial level in New Zealand. He was part of the Counties Manukau development team that won the Northern Region Development Competition in 2012.

Rowland played for North Harbour in the 2015 ITM Cup, making seven appearances and scoring one try. During this time he also captained North Harbour's sevens team. Under Rowland's captaincy, the side made it to the final of New Zealand's national sevens competition, but were beaten by Counties Manukau.

=== Connacht ===
July 2016, it was announced that Rowland had joined Irish provincial side Connacht.

== International ==
Rowland qualified to play for Ireland through his grandmother, who came from Dublin. In 2016, he joined the Ireland national rugby sevens team. He made his first appearance for the side in a qualification repechage for the 2016 Rio Olympics, which took place in Monaco. Rowland also played in the Rugby Europe Trophy in July 2016, which Ireland won. Rowland also played in the 2017 Grand Prix sevens series.
