= Naulia Dawai =

Fijian rugby union player

- Born: Ratu Napolioni Naulia Teua Dawai; 26 June 1987 (age 39) Nadi, Fiji
- Height: 1.83 m (6 ft 0 in)
- Weight: 109.6 kg (17 st 4 lb; 242 lb)
- School: Marist Brothers High School

Rugby union career
- Position: Flanker
- Current team: Seattle Seawolves
Senior career
Years	Team	Apps	(Points)
2019	Asia Pacific Dragons		
2020	New England Free Jacks		
2021	Seattle Seawolves		
- Correct as of 7 June 2021
Provincial / State sides
Years	Team	Apps	(Points)
2013	Southland	9	(0)
2014–16	Otago	27	(65)
2016–18	Connacht	21	(15)
2018–19	Otago	26	(70)
- Correct as of 4 November 2018
International career
Years	Team	Apps	(Points)
2016–	Fiji	8	(0)
- Correct as of 24 June 2017

Naulia Dawai (born 26 June 1987) is a Fijian rugby union player. He primarily plays as a flanker. Dawai currently plays for the Seattle Seawolves of Major League Rugby (MLR).

He previously played for the New England Free Jacks in North America's Major League Rugby competition. Internationally, he has represented Fiji at test level.

== Early life ==
Dawai is originally from Nadi, a city on the island of Viti Levu in Fiji. He attended Marist Brothers High School in Suva, a city on the same island. Dawai moved to New Zealand in 2011.

== Rugby career ==
=== New Zealand provincial rugby ===
After moving to New Zealand in 2011, Dawai played club rugby in Southland. After two years at that level, he made the province's squad for the 2013 National Provincial Championship. Dawai featured mostly as a replacement, making one start for the side. He played eight times in the regular season, and also featured in Southland's play-off semi-final against the Tasman Makos, coming on as a late replacement for John Hardie in a 49–28 defeat.

The following season Dawai moved provinces to Otago. His first campaign with his new side saw him make just five appearances in the 2014 NPC with three of these coming as a replacement, as Otago finished second from bottom in the Championship Division.

Dawai became a regular figure in the team in the 2015 season however. He made 11 appearances, five of these being starts and scored seven tries, making him the team's leading try scorer in the competition that year. This included three tries scored against Auckland on 13 September 2015, which saw him become the fourth player in to score a hat trick at Eden Park in the National Provincial Championship. The campaign saw Otago reach the semi-finals of the Championship Division, where they were beaten 34–14 by Wellington.

In the 2016 season he has continued to play regularly for the side, playing in all nine of the team's regular season games, starting six. He also continued his strong scoring form, with five tries in the competition. It was announced on 12 October 2016, ahead of the final game of the regular season, that Dawai would leave Otago. Despite this, he was named to start in the Otago team to face Manawatu the day after the move was finalised and played the full 80 minutes as Otago secured their spot in the play-offs for the second season in a row.

=== Connacht ===
In October 2016, it was announced that Dawai had signed a two-year deal with Irish provincial team Connacht. He will join the team at the end of the 2016 National Provincial Championship. He was recommended to Connacht by Otago head coach Cory Brown, who had previously worked for the province.

He made his debut for Connacht off the bench in the 2016–17 European Rugby Champions Cup against Wasps scoring a try in the dying minutes which led to a conversion by Jack Carty which won Connacht the match.

=== International ===
In June 2016, Dawai was called up to the Fiji squad by head coach John McKee for the 2016 Pacific Nations Cup and a one-off test match against Georgia. He was a late replacement in the squad for Dominiko Waqaniburotu. After impressing in training, Dawai was named to start at blindside flanker against Tonga in the PNC opener. He made his debut for Fiji on 11 June 2016 in a 23–18 win, playing the entire 80 minutes. Dawai started again the following week against Samoa, playing the full game again as won 26–16 to claim the PNC title. Dawai made his third appearance for Fiji a week later again, when he started against Georgia, a game which the touring Georgians won 14–3. He was also part of the team that beat the touring Scotland side 22–27 in 2017 and is it only the second time the pacific islanders have won since their first win back in 1998.
