= Jason Harris-Wright =

Irish rugby union player (born 1988)

- Born: Jason Harris-Wright; 19 September 1988 (age 38) Dublin, Ireland
- Height: 1.78 m (5 ft 10 in)
- Weight: 104 kg (16 st 5 lb)
- School: Presentation College; Blackrock College

Rugby union career
- Position: Hooker
Amateur team(s)
Years	Team	Apps	(Points)
2009–2011	Greystones		
2012-2016	Clontarf		
Senior career
Years	Team	Apps	(Points)
2009–2011	Leinster	17	(0)
2011–2012	Bristol	11	(0)
2012–2016	Connacht	52	(10)
2016–2017	London Irish	3	(0)
2017–2018	Bristol Rugby	17	(45)
- Correct as of 20 January 2021
International career
Years	Team	Apps	(Points)
2006–2007	Ireland U19	6	
2008	Ireland U20	10	

Jason Harris-Wright (born 19 September 1988) is a rugby union player from Ireland. He primarily plays as a hooker. Harris-Wright last played professionally for Bristol in the Greene King IPA Championship.

== Early life ==
Harris-Wright grew up in Kilcoole in County Wicklow. He was a student at Presentation College in Bray and played at number 8 for the school rugby team as they reached the final of the Leinster Schools Junior Cup, only to be beaten by Blackrock College, one of the traditional powers in the schools game. In his final school year Harris-Wright moved to Blackrock himself, in the hopes of winning a Senior Cup with the school and increasing his chances of being noticed for representative teams and under-age Leinster squads. However, in a major shock, Blackrock were knocked out of the Cup by an unfancied Kilkenny College. Harris-Wright played rugby at amateur level with Greystones until 2009, when he moved to Clontarf.

== Club career ==
=== Leinster ===
Harris-Wright started out his career with his native province of Leinster. He came through the academy, having earned seven caps for the Leinster Schools team, and made five appearances for the province's under-20s. Harris-Wright also played for the province's second-tier side Leinster A, playing four times in the British and Irish Cup and 11 times outside it, primarily against other provincial 'A' teams.

Harris-Wright was promoted to the first team ahead of the 2009–10 season when he was given his first senior contract. Despite being promoted to the senior squad, he didn't make his debut for the side until 23 April 2010, when he came on as a replacement against Glasgow Warriors in the 2009–10 Celtic League.

The following season saw Harris-Wright play more regularly, due to the retirement of first choice hooker John Fogarty. New Leinster coach Joe Schmidt regularly used Harris-Wright as a replacement in the league and in Europe. Harris-Wright made his European debut for Leinster in a 2010–11 Heineken Cup pool stage game against Racing Metro on 9 December 2010. He made his first start for the team against Ospreys in the league on 28 November 2010. Harris-Wright made 11 league appearances in total for the season, with all but three of these coming from the bench. Harris-Wright played in four Heineken Cup games, including the final against Northampton Saints which Leinster won, with all of these appearances coming from the bench.

Harris-Wright stayed with Leinster through summer 2011, playing preseason matches with the team, but the signing of Seán Cronin meant he was no longer as prominent a member of the squad. He left Leinster in November 2011, moving to English side Bristol, having made 16 appearances for Leinster.

=== Bristol ===
Harris-Wright signed for English side Bristol on 8 November 2011. He made 11 appearances for them throughout the season, as Bristol topped the league table in the 2011–12 RFU Championship. Despite topping their Group in Stage 2 of the competition however, Bristol were beaten by Cornish Pirates 63–53 on aggregate in the play-off semi-finals and missed out on promotion.

=== Connacht ===
In May 2012, he signed for Connacht, joining them ahead of the 2012–13 season. His first game for the province was against his former side Leinster on 28 September 2012. Harris-Wright came on as a replacement, as Connacht beat the Heineken cup holders 34–6. He made 14 league appearances in his debut season, all but two of these coming as starts, and scored his first try for the side in a Pro12 game against Edinburgh on 1 December 2012. Harris-Wright also made appearances in five of Connacht's six 2012–13 Heineken Cup group stage games, starting four.

In the following season, Harris-Wright continued to feature regularly, playing 18 times in the 2013–14 Pro12 and in all six of Connacht's group games in the 2013–14 Heineken Cup. He scored a single try during the course of the season, in a Pro12 game against Scarlets on 23 November 2013. Towards the end of the season however, Harris-Wright suffered a dislocated shoulder against Cardiff Blues and was ruled out for six months.

Harris-Wright missed much of the 2014–15 season with a knee injury sustained against Zebre in the Pro12 on 21 November 2014. He made just two appearances in the 2014–15 Pro12, and another two in the Challenge Cup.

=== London Irish ===
On 4 August 2016. Harris-Wright was signed by English side London Irish.

=== Bristol ===
On 11 April 2017, Harris-Wright resigns with Bristol Rugby in the RFU Championship ahead of the 2017–18 season.

== International career ==
Internationally, Harris-Wright has played for his country at under-age level. He played 6 times for the Ireland under-19 team before it was merged with the under-21 side to form the Ireland under-20's side. He then earned 10 caps for the Under-20's.
