= Ivan Soroka =

Ukraine-born Irish rugby union player (1994-)

- Born: 1 October 1994 (age 32) Kyiv, Ukraine
- Height: 1.8 m (5 ft 11 in)
- Weight: 110 kg (17 st 5 lb)
- School: Belvedere College
- University: UCD
- Notable relative: Alex Soroka (brother)

Rugby union career
- Position: Prop
Amateur team(s)
Years	Team	Apps	(Points)
2013–2014	UCD		
2014–	Clontarf		
Senior career
Years	Team	Apps	(Points)
2016–2017	Connacht	1	(0)
2025-	Leinster	1	(0)
- Correct as of 1 March 2025

Ivan Soroka (born 1 October 1994) is a rugby union player born in Ukraine, and who grew up in Ireland. He plays as a prop. Soroka previously played for Irish provincial side Connacht in the Pro14. Soroka joined Connacht for the 2016–17 season, having spent the preseason on trial with the team.

== Early life ==
Soroka was born in Kyiv. He grew up in Dublin and attended Belvedere College, playing for the school's rugby team in the Leinster Senior Schools Cup and has since coached the team. While playing for Belvedere, Soroka also played for Leinster at under-age level.

== Rugby career ==
=== Amateur career ===
Soroka played at amateur club level for UCD, Clontarf in the All-Ireland League. He won an under 20 Interprovincial championship in 2013, Leinster Senior Cup in 2015 and an AIL title in 2016 with the team.

=== Connacht ===
Soroka trained with provincial side Connacht in the 2016–17 preseason, being part of the team's squad for a friendly with Montpellier. In October 2016, it was announced that he had signed a one-year contract with the side, his first professional team. On 1 April 2017, Soroka made his debut for Connacht off the bench in the loss to Zebre.

=== International ===
Soroka was born in Kyiv, but has never represented any Ukrainian side. He is qualified to play for Ireland internationally, but did not represent any Irish under-age teams. Soroka has however played for the Irish national club team.
