= Peter McCabe (rugby union) =

Irish rugby union player

- Born: 5 March 1992 (age 34) Dromtarriffe, Ireland
- Height: 1.83 m (6 ft 0 in)
- Weight: 117 kg (18.4 st; 258 lb)
- School: Christian Brothers College
- University: University College Cork

Rugby union career
- Position: Prop
Youth career
- Kanturk
Amateur team(s)
Years	Team	Apps	(Points)
- UCC
2014-2016	Dolphin		
Senior career
Years	Team	Apps	(Points)
2016–2017	Munster	5	(0)
2017	→ Connacht (loan)	0	(0)
2017–2020	Connacht	37	(0)
2020–2021	Bristol Bears	4	(5)
- Correct as of 26 September 2021

Peter McCabe (born 5 March 1992) is an Irish rugby union player. He plays as a prop He previously played for his native province of Munster, Connacht and Bristol Bears. In addition to playing at professional level, McCabe has represented Cork city club Dolphin in club rugby.

== Professional career ==
=== Munster ===
McCabe made his competitive debut for Munster when he came on as a substitute against Ospreys in a 2016–17 Pro12 fixture on 4 November 2016, and made his first start for Munster in the Pro12 fixture against Edinburgh on 3 February 2017. However, McCabe left Munster at the end of the 2016–17 season. Following his departure from Connacht after two seasons with the westerners, McCabe returned to Munster to participate in pre-season training on a non-contract basis.

=== Connacht ===
McCabe had joined Munster's provincial rivals Connacht on loan in January 2017. By the end of January 2017, he had returned to training with Munster following the completion of his loan. Following his release by Munster, McCabe returned to Connacht permanently on a one-year contract. His contract was extended in March 2018 for a further season. In April 2019, it was announced that McCabe would leave Connacht at the end of the 2018–19 season, having made a total of 37 appearances in his time with the team, however, due to an injury to new signing Paddy McAllister, McCabe returned to Connacht in November 2019 on a short-term contract.

=== Bristol Bears ===
McCabe joined English Premiership Rugby side Bristol Bears, where former Connacht coach Pat Lam is in charge, on a short-term deal in August 2020, as front-row injury cover until October 2020. He made his debut for Bristol in their 40–7 defeat against Sale Sharks on 29 August 2020.

In November 2020 it was confirmed he had signed a one-year contract extension for the 2020–21 season.
