= Stacey Ili =

Samoan rugby union player

- Born: 11 May 1991 (age 35) Auckland, New Zealand
- Height: 181 cm (5 ft 11 in)
- Weight: 94 kg (207 lb; 14 st 11 lb)
- School: Onehunga High School
- Notable relative: Shea Ili (brother)

Rugby union career
- Position: Midfield back
Senior career
Years	Team	Apps	(Points)
2015	Melbourne Rising	8	(20)
2016	Auckland	1	(0)
2016–2017	Connacht	14	(20)
2018–2023	Hawke's Bay	61	(30)
2021–2023	Rebels	33	(20)
- Correct as of 1 August 2024
International career
Years	Team	Apps	(Points)
2018–	Samoa	9	(15)
- Correct as of 4 September 2024

Stacey Ili (born 11 May 1991) is a professional rugby union player, who most recently played as a midfield back for Hawke's Bay in New Zealand's domestic National Provincial Championship competition. From 2021 to 2023 he also played for the Rebels in Super Rugby. He was born and raised in New Zealand, but has represented Manu Samoa internationally, for which he is eligible due to his Samoan heritage.

== Early life ==
Ili was a student at Onehunga High School in Auckland. While there he played rugby union for the school side. Ili also played basketball for the school. Ili was involved with Auckland from 2012 and played sevens for the side, but did not represent the senior XVs side before his move to Australia to join Melbourne Rising.

== Professional rugby career ==
=== Melbourne Rising ===
Ili played for Melbourne Rising, the Melbourne Rebels' NRC side in the 2015 season. He made seven appearances in the nine-game regular season, starting all of them, and scored tries against North Harbour Rays, Perth Spirit and Sydney Stars as the Rising finished third to qualify for the play-offs. Ili started the play-off semi-final against the UC Vikings and scored the game's opening try after 16 minutes, but was ultimately on the losing side with the Rising beaten 50–34.

=== Auckland ===
Ili returned to his native New Zealand for the 2016 season, joining Auckland. He started on the wing for the team in their opening match away to Canterbury, where Auckland were beaten 43–3. In September 2016, it was announced that Ili had signed for Irish side Connacht, and would be joining the team within a week, meaning he would depart before the end of the season.

=== Connacht ===
Ili joined Connacht for the 2016–17 Pro12 season.

== Personal life ==
Ili's younger brother, Shea, is a professional basketball player. Shea Ili plays as a point guard and has played internationally for New Zealand.

== Super Rugby statistics ==
As of 3 June 2023

Season	Team	Games	Starts	Sub	Mins	Tries	Cons	Pens	Drops	Points	Yel	Red
2021 AU	Rebels	8	8	0	554	1	0	0	0	5	0	0
2021 TT	Rebels	4	3	1	201	1	0	0	0	5	0	0
2022	Rebels	10	9	1	700	0	0	0	0	0	0	0
2023	Rebels	11	9	2	639	2	0	0	0	10	0	0
Total		33	29	4	2,094	4	0	0	0	20	0	0
