= Lewis Stevenson (rugby union) =

- Born: Lewis Henry Clarke Stevenson; 1 June 1984 (age 42) Larne, Northern Ireland
- Height: 2.01 m (6 ft 7 in)
- Weight: 117 kg (18 st 6 lb)
- School: Ballyclare High School

Rugby union career
- Position: Lock
Senior career
Years	Team	Apps	(Points)
2005–2007	Ulster	0	(0)
2007–2009	Exeter Chiefs	63	(25)
2009–2011	Harlequins	28	(0)
2011–2016	Ulster	90	(5)
2016	Exeter Chiefs	4	(0)
2016–2017	Connacht	13	(5)
- Correct as of 21 May 2017
International career
Years	Team	Apps	(Points)
2013	Emerging Ireland	1	(0)
2013	Ireland Wolfhounds	1	(0)
- Correct as of 11 Feb 2015

Lewis Henry Clarke Stevenson (born 1 June 1984) is an Irish rugby union footballer. He previously played for the Ulster, Exeter Chiefs and Harlequins. He currently plays for Connacht in the Pro14 as a lock.

== Life and career ==
Stevenson grew up outside a small village called Ballynure, approximately 12 miles from Belfast. He attended Ballynure Primary school until attending Ballyclare High School. From year 8, Stevenson then started playing rugby. Stevenson then made the Medallion XV rugby squad as a replacement, despite being a year too young to normally play. That year the team reached the semi-final where they lost to Regent House (the eventual champions). The next year he played again for the Medallion XV where he and fellow team members won the Medallion Plate that year against Larne Grammar.
