= Steve Crosbie =

Irish rugby player, New Zealand-based since 2016

- Born: Stephen Crosbie; 10 February 1993 (age 33) Cork, Ireland
- Height: 1.85 m (6 ft 1 in)
- Weight: 93 kg (14.6 st; 205 lb)
- School: St. Gerard's School
- University: University College Dublin
- Notable relative: David Corkery (second cousin)

Rugby union career
- Position: Fly-half
Amateur team(s)
Years	Team	Apps	(Points)
2011–	Old Belvedere		
Senior career
Years	Team	Apps	(Points)
2014–2016	Leinster	2	(0)
2016	Munster	0	(0)
2017–2018	Connacht	9	(24)
- Correct as of 28 April 2018
Provincial / State sides
Years	Team	Apps	(Points)
2016	Wanganui	4	(26)
International career
Years	Team	Apps	(Points)
2013	Ireland U20	8	(0)
- Correct as of 23 June 2013

Steve Crosbie (born 10 February 1993) is an Irish former rugby union player. He primarily played as a fly-half, but has also played at centre. A former student at St. Gerard's School in Bray, Crosbie came through the academy of his native province, Leinster, and has played at amateur level for Old Belvedere and New Zealand provincial side Wanganui.

== Early life ==
Crosbie was born in Cork, but grew up on the east coast of Ireland, attending St. Gerard's School in Bray. He represented the school's rugby team in the Leinster Senior Cup, playing in the same team as Jack Conan. In addition to rugby, Crosbie played Gaelic football, golf and tennis in his youth. He is a second cousin of the former Irish international rugby player David Corkery.

== Club rugby ==
=== Leinster academy ===
Crosbie joined the Leinster Academy ahead of the 2013–14 season. On 13 September 2014 he made his debut for the senior side, playing for 20 minutes from the bench against Scarlets in the 2014–15 Pro12. On 31 October 2014, Crosbie was on the bench against Edinburgh in the same competition but was forced on early, playing 60 minutes after Ben Te'o was forced off through injury.

=== Wanganui ===
In 2016, after leaving the Leinster academy, Crosbie moved to New Zealand joining amateur provincial side Wanganui. He was one of a number of young players to make the journey from Leinster to New Zealand, including Gavin Thornbury, Oliver Jager and Harrison Brewer. Crosbie played four games in the 2016 Heartland Championship, scoring 26 points but departed after the fifth round to take an offer from Munster to return to Ireland.

=== Munster ===
On 29 September 2016, it was announced that Crosbie had signed a three-month senior deal with Munster and he left Wanganui with immediate effect. He was signed following the forced retirement of out-half Johnny Holland and an injury to Bill Johnston. Crosbie was still behind Tyler Bleyendaal and Ian Keatley in the pecking order however, and did not make a senior appearance for the team, instead featured for the province's 'A' side.

=== Connacht ===
In January 2017, Crosbie signed a short-term deal with another Irish province, this time Connacht following injuries to Marnitz Boshoff, Jack Carty, Shane O'Leary and Craig Ronaldson. He made his debut on 3 March 2017 in a 2016–17 Pro12 game against Zebre. In total he made three appearances and scored 17 points before the end of the season. In May 2017, it was announced that Crosbie had signed an extension to his deal with Connacht to remain with the team for the 2017–18 season.

== International rugby ==
Crosbie has represented Ireland internationally at under-age level. He was part of the Ireland under-20 team for the 2013 season, making his debut against Wales in the 2013 Six Nations Under 20s Championship. In May 2013, Crosbie was named in the Irish squad for the Junior World Championship. He featured in all five of the team's games in the tournament, taking his total number of appearances for the under-20 side to 13.

== Post playing Life ==
Steve opened a sauna company called Fad Saoil in 2019.
