= Craig Ronaldson =

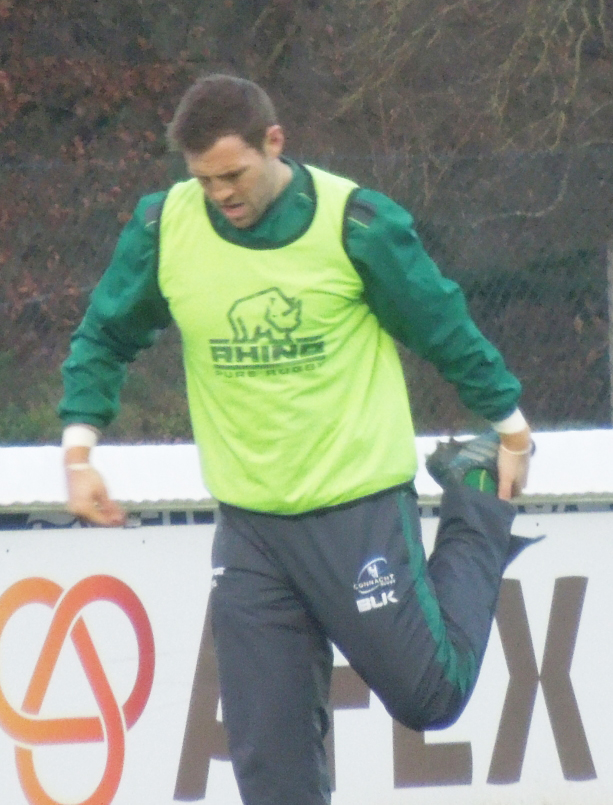
- Born: 8 February 1990 (age 36) Kildare, Ireland
- Height: 1.85 m (6 ft 1 in)
- Weight: 96 kg (15 st 2 lb)
- School: Kilkenny College
- University: University College Dublin
- Height and weight correct as of 9 May 2019

Rugby union career
- Position: Fly-half
Amateur team(s)
Years	Team	Apps	(Points)
2008–2013	Lansdowne		
2013–2019	Galway Corinthians		
Senior career
Years	Team	Apps	(Points)
2013–2019	Connacht	89	(375)
- Correct as of 9 May 2019

Craig Ronaldson (born 8 February 1990) is a rugby union player from Ireland. His primary position is at fly half, though he also plays as a centre. Ronaldson most recently played professionally for Irish provincial side Connacht in the Pro14, where he spent six seasons from 2013 to 2019.

Before joining Connacht, Ronaldson played amateur rugby in the All-Ireland League. He played with Lansdowne, and in the 2012–13 season was the league's top scorer. He kicked 206 points in 16 games, helping his club to win the Division 1A title.

== Early life ==
Born in Kildare, Ronaldson came from a rugby playing family, with his father Tim having played for Leinster at Junior level, and his grandfather, Bill Tector, being an Ireland international. Ronaldson's first club in the sport was Naas. In addition to rugby, Ronaldson has also played cricket. He lined out for Halverstown Cricket Club, where his father has also served as a chairman.

Ronaldson attended Kilkenny College, where he played for the school's rugby team. He was part of the team that beat Blackrock College in the 2007 Leinster Senior Cup quarter-finals in a shocking upset. The following year saw Ronaldson named captain of the school side. After finishing secondary school, Ronaldson studied Sports Management at University College Dublin.

== Rugby career ==
=== Lansdowne ===
When he moved to Dublin to attend university, Ronaldson joined city club Lansdowne in the All-Ireland League, the country's top level amateur competition. After graduating university, he remained with Lansdowne and began working at Wesley College as a housemaster and PE teacher. His performances with Lansdowne saw him included in Leinster development squads, and he was also called up to the Ireland Clubs side.

In the 2012–13 season, Ronaldson was the league's top scorer, helping Lansdowne to reach the Division 1A decider. He was prominent in the final, as Lansdowne beat Clontarf 32–27 to claim their first ever title. In total, Ronaldson scored 206 points in 16 games. His contributions to the team's victory saw him named the league's player of the season.

=== Connacht ===
Ronaldson's form in Lansdowne's title-winning season earned him a move to Connacht, and he signed a one-year contract with the province in 2013. His first competitive game for Connacht was in the first round of the Pro12, as he came on as a substitute in a 25–16 win over Zebre. His first start for the province came against the Ospreys on 28 September 2013. Ronaldson kicked 4 out of his 5 penalties in a 26-43 defeat. Ronaldson made his Heineken Cup debut against Saracens, playing at inside centre as Connacht came close to an upset before losing 17–23. Injuries saw his number of appearances trail off as the season went on, but Ronaldson played a total of 14 times in his first year, scoring 38 points. In November 2013, it was announced that he had signed an extension to his contract, keeping him with Connacht until 2016.

Ronaldson continued playing regularly in his second season, featuring mainly at out-half. An injury against Munster in January 2015 disrupted his later season, but he made a total of 12 appearances in the league and five in the Challenge Cup. In the 2015–16 season Ronaldson continued to appear regularly, primarily playing as an inside centre alongside Bundee Aki. He was named the team's Player of the Month for November 2015 in recognition of these performances. Ronaldson suffered a knee injury in the end-of-season run in as Connacht chased a place in the knockout stages of the league. He ultimately missed out on playing in the team's Pro12 triumph, making a total of 20 appearances in the season. In April 2016, it was announced that Ronaldson had signed a further extension to his deal, taking him through to summer 2018.

Ronaldson made his first appearance of the 2016–17 season against Ulster in October 2016, after almost 6 months out injured and was a starter for the team at inside centre for the next two months. He was injured again in late November however, and didn't return until mid-January. After returning from injury Ronaldson was a mainstay in the side for the remainder of the season, and made a total of 17 appearances in all competitions for 2016–17, scoring 100 points in the process. The form of Tom Farrell at centre in the 2017–18 season saw Ronaldson used more regularly as a replacement than in previous seasons, and he returned to playing primarily at fly-half as cover for Jack Carty. Of his 17 appearances in all competitions, 11 came from the bench. In March 2018, it was announced Ronaldson had signed another extension to his deal with Connacht. Ronaldson suffered a serious injury early in the 2018–19 season, and subsequently missed the remainder of the season. He left the province at the end of the season. In total, Ronaldson scored 368 points in 89 competitive games for Connacht across his six seasons with the team.
