= Nigel Carolan =

- Born: 27 December 1974 (age 51) Galway, Ireland
- Height: 1.78 m (5 ft 10 in)
- School: St. Joseph's Patrician College
- University: NUI Galway

Rugby union career
Amateur team(s)
Years	Team	Apps	(Points)
- Galway Corinthians
- Galwegians
Senior career
Years	Team	Apps	(Points)
1996–2000	Connacht	40	(25)
Coaching career
- Years: Team
- 2004–17: Connacht Academy
- 2008–10: Ireland U20 (Assistant)
- 2012–14: Connacht Eagles
- 2014–17: Ireland U20
- 2017–21: Connacht (Backs)
- 2021–: Glasgow Warriors (Assistant)
- 2026–: Scotland 'A'

Nigel Carolan (born 27 December 1974) is a rugby union coach from Ireland. He is currently the Assistant coach to Scottish United Rugby Championship side Glasgow Warriors. He was previously a Backs coach at Connacht. Before becoming a coach Carolan represented Connacht as a player, but was forced to retire due to injury in 2000.

== Early life ==
Carolan is a native of Galway and was a student in St. Joseph's Patrician College in the city. After finishing school, he attended Galway-Mayo IT studying marketing. He later studied systems analysis at NUI Galway.

== Playing career ==
Carolan played primarily as a wing, but was also used at centre during his career. He represented both Galway Corinthians and Galwegians at amateur level. In 1996, at the outset of the professional era Carolan was a part of Warren Gatland's Connacht side. He played for the side in the Interprovincial Championship and the European Challenge Cup until 2000, when a neck injury forced him to retire at the age of 26.

== Coaching career ==
Carolan was appointed as head of Connacht's academy in 2004, overseeing the development pathways of youth players, coaching under-age sides and scouting youth prospects from outside the province. For the first year of his career, he also served as a technical analyst to the Irish under-21 team. Carolan was later appointed as assistant coach to the Irish under-20s under Allen Clarke in 2008, staying in the role until 2010.

In the 2012–13 season Connacht's second tier side, the Connacht Eagles began competing in the British and Irish Cup, with Carolan serving as the team's head coach. He performed this role for two seasons, before being appointed to succeed Mike Ruddock as head coach of the Ireland under-20 team in October 2014. Carolan coached the side in three Six Nations and two World Championships, with the team's runner-up finish in the 2016 World Championship their best ever performance in the tournament.

In March 2017, it was announced that Carolan would be part of the new senior backroom team under Kieran Keane for the 2017–18 season. Following this announcement, he left his role with the Irish under-20s with immediate effect, with Peter Malone replacing him for the upcoming World Championship. The promotion brought an end to Carolan's 13-year stewardship of the province's academy, with former Connacht head coach Eric Elwood named as his replacement in May 2017.

On 21 June 2021 it was announced that Carolan was appointed as an Assistant Coach at Glasgow Warriors, focussing on attack. Carolan said of the move:

Glasgow Warriors play an exciting brand of rugby that fits perfectly with my own philosophies on how the game should be played. I’ve also been really impressed with the clarity and direction in which Danny Wilson and Al Kellock are taking the club. The squad consists of world-class players and some really exciting up and coming young players. Helping those players realise their potential is something I will take a lot of pride in.

It was announced that he would take charge of the Scotland 'A' team in their match against an Italy XV in February 2026. This role was in addition to his Glasgow Warriors duties.
