= Dominic Robertson-McCoy =

NZ rugby union player

- Born: 10 November 1993 (age 33) Auckland, New Zealand
- Height: 1.88 m (6 ft 2 in)
- Weight: 119 kg (18 st 10 lb)
- School: Sacred Heart College

Rugby union career
- Position: Prop
- Current team: Connacht
Amateur team(s)
Years	Team	Apps	(Points)
2013–2014	Auckland Marist		
2015–2016	Hikurangi		
- Correct as of 27 September 2017
Provincial / State sides
Years	Team	Apps	(Points)
2015	Northland	3	(0)
2016–2024	Connacht	84	(5)
2024–	Aurillac	84	(5)
- Correct as of 16 May 2024

Dominic Robertson-McCoy (born 10 November 1993) is a professional rugby union player from New Zealand. He primarily plays as a prop and can play at both loosehead and tighthead. Robertson-McCoy currently plays for Irish provincial side Connacht in the United Rugby Championship. He previously played at provincial level in New Zealand for Northland. Robertson-McCoy is qualified to play for Ireland at international level through his grandfather from Mowhan in County Armagh.

== Early life ==
Born in Auckland, Robertson-McCoy attended Sacred Heart College in the city. During his time in the school, Robertson-McCoy played for the school's rugby team. During his time in school, he also played for Auckland under-age teams. In 2013, Robertson-McCoy began playing for the Auckland Marist senior side, having played under-age for them already. In 2014 he was part of Auckland's wider training group for the National Provincial Championship.

== Rugby career ==
=== Northland ===
Robertson-McCoy began playing for Northland in the 2015 NPC. The move to Northland also meant a move from Marist to Hikurangi. Robertson-McCoy made his debut for Northland when he started at tighthead prop against Hawke's Bay in the season opener on 16 August 2015. He played his next game against Wellington on 29 August, coming on as a 64th minute replacement for Namatahi Waa. Robertson-McCoy played again a week later against Taranaki, coming off the bench at half time and again replacing Waa. He played a total of three times for the side in the competition as the team lost all their games and finished bottom of the Championship Division. During his time with Northland, Robertson-McCoy was part of the Blues Development side. It was announced during the summer in 2016 that Robertson-McCoy was moving to Ireland to join Pro12 champions Connacht. Robertson-McCoy joined Connacht for their pre-season and played no part for Northland in the 2016 NPC.

=== Connacht ===
It was announced in June 2016 that Robertson-McCoy signed for Connacht and would join them ahead of the 2016–17 season. He is Irish-qualified through his grandfather, who was born in County Armagh. Robertson-McCoy made his debut for Connacht on 10 September 2016, coming as a late replacement against Ospreys in the Pro12. He made nine further first team appearances during the course of the season, all in the league, and also played for the province's second-tier side, the Connacht Eagles, appearing three times in the semi-professional British and Irish Cup. In May 2017, it was announced that Robertson-McCoy had signed an extension to his deal with Connacht, keeping him with the side for the 2017–18 season. On 21 October 2017, Robertson-McCoy made his European debut, starting at home against Worcester Warriors in the 2017–18 Challenge Cup. He made a total of seven appearances for the first team during the season, five of these coming in the league and two in the Challenge Cup. As in the previous season, he also played for the Connacht Eagles. Robertson-McCoy signed another contract extension in March 2018, continuing his stay with the province.

=== Aurillac ===
On 30 August 2024, it was confirmed that Robertson-McCoy would join Pro D2 side Aurillac in France for the 2024–25 season.
