= 2016–17 Pro12 =

Professional rugby union competition

- Countries: Ireland; Italy; Scotland; Wales
- Champions: Scarlets (2nd title)
- Runners-up: Munster
- Matches played: 135
- Attendance: 1,184,091 (average 8,771 per match)
- Highest attendance: 60,642 – Judgement Day (15 April 2017)
- Lowest attendance: 1,240 – Zebre v Munster (25 March 2017)
- Tries scored: 716 (average 5.3 per match)
- Top point scorer: Angus O'Brien (Newport Gwent Dragons) (130 points)
- Top try scorer: Steff Evans (Scarlets) (11 tries)

Official website
- www.pro14rugby.org

The 2016–17 Pro12 (also known as the Guinness Pro12 for sponsorship reasons) was the sixteenth season of the professional rugby union competition originally known as the Celtic League, and the seventh with a four-country format. It was the third season to be referred to as the Guinness Pro12.

The twelve competing teams were the four Irish teams: Connacht, Leinster, Munster and Ulster; two Italian teams: Treviso and Zebre; two Scottish teams: Edinburgh and Glasgow Warriors and four Welsh teams: Cardiff Blues, Newport Gwent Dragons, Ospreys and Scarlets. The first stage involved the 12 teams playing home and away in a league format with the top four sides qualifying for the semi-finals. The semi-finals were one-off matches with 1st playing 4th and 2nd playing 3rd, with the higher ranked team receiving home advantage. The winners of the semi-finals proceeded to the Pro 12 final which was played at the Aviva Stadium on 27 May 2017. The final was contested by Scarlets and Munster with Scarlets winning 46–22.

== Teams ==
Location of 2016–17 Pro12 teams in Great Britain and Ireland.	Location of 2016–17 Pro12 teams in Italy
Winners; 2nd–4th place; Other teams.

Team	Coach / Director of Rugby	Captain	Stadium	Capacity
(Italy) Benetton Treviso	(New Zealand) Kieran Crowley	(Italy) Alessandro Zanni	Stadio Comunale di Monigo	6,700
(Wales) Cardiff Blues	(England) Danny Wilson	(Wales) Gethin Jenkins	BT Sport Cardiff Arms Park	12,125
(Ireland) Connacht	(Samoa) Pat Lam	(Ireland) John Muldoon	The Sportsground	8,100
(Scotland) Edinburgh	(Scotland) Duncan Hodge (For (South Africa) Alan Solomons) (Note: Alan Solomons began the tournament as Edinburgh head coach, but stood down on 28 September 2016, and replaced by Duncan Hodge.)	(Scotland) Grant Gilchrist (Scotland) Stuart McInally	New Myreside; Murrayfield Stadium (Note: On 10 May 2016, it was announced that Edinburgh will move all their home games to Myreside for the second half of the season, as their new permanent home ground.)	5,500; 67,144 (Note: Although Murrayfield's full capacity is 67,144, only the lower section of the West Stand, with a capacity of 12,464, is generally opened for Edinburgh fixtures. More capacity would be available for derby games against Glasgow Warriors.)
(Scotland) Glasgow Warriors	(Scotland) Gregor Townsend	(Scotland) Jonny Gray (Scotland) Henry Pyrgos	Scotstoun Stadium	7,351
(Ireland) Leinster	(Ireland) Leo Cullen	(Fiji) Isa Nacewa	RDS Arena; Aviva Stadium	18,500; 51,700
(Ireland) Munster	(South Africa) Rassie Erasmus	(Ireland) Peter O'Mahony	Thomond Park; Irish Independent Park	25,600; 8,200
(Wales) Newport Gwent Dragons	(Wales) Kingsley Jones	(Wales) Lewis Evans	Rodney Parade; Virginia Park (Note: On 23 March 2017, it was announced that Caerphilly RFC's ground Virginia Park would host the Dragons round 22 clash against the Blues. Rodney Parade was unable to hold the fixture due to other events being held at the ground.)	8,500; 6,000 (Note: Virginia Park's regular capacity is 4,999 but will be increased to 6,000 with temporary seating.)
(Wales) Ospreys	(Wales) Steve Tandy	(Wales) Alun Wyn Jones	Liberty Stadium	20,827
(Wales) Scarlets	(New Zealand) Wayne Pivac	(Wales) Ken Owens	Parc y Scarlets	14,870
(Ireland) Ulster	(Australia) Les Kiss	(Ireland) Rob Herring (Ireland) Andrew Trimble	Kingspan Stadium	18,196
(Italy) Zebre	(Argentina) Víctor Jiménez (For (Italy) Gianluca Guidi) (Note: Gianluca Guidi began the tournament as Zebre head coach, but on mutual agreement with the club and himself, left his post as head coach on 17 January 2017. He was replaced with Víctor Jiménez.)	(Italy) George Biagi	Stadio Sergio Lanfranchi	5,000

== Changes for the season ==
=== Ireland ===
Reigning champions Connacht started the season with a new coaching team. Backs and kicking coach Andre Bell left his role to return to his family in New Zealand. Head performance analyst and assistant attack coach Conor McPhillips took over coaching of the backs, while the team's former head coach Eric Elwood took over as kicking coach. The close season also saw the departure of the side's all-time record try-scorer Fionn Carr, who scored 42 tries over two spells with the province. Connacht's homeground, The Sportsground underwent renovations during the summer, with the addition of a seated stand increasing its capacity to 8,100.

Beaten finalists Leinster also saw changes to their backroom staff, with defence coach Kurt McQuilkin leaving the role for personal reasons in August 2016. Former England head coach Stuart Lancaster joined the province in the role of "senior coach" the following month as McQuilkin's replacement. Leinster also hired World Cup winning former New Zealand head coach Graham Henry as a consultant coach during the off-season. After taking over the captaincy when Kevin McLaughlin was forced to retire, Isa Nacewa was appointed as team captain on a permanent basis ahead of the season opener.

After finishing sixth in the previous season, Munster replaced much of their coaching staff. Johan "Rassie" Erasmus joined as Director of Rugby from his role as high performance manager with South Africa, while Jacques Nienaber is the new defence coach. Head coach Anthony Foley remained part of the coaching team, with a focus on lineouts and the breakdown. Jerry Flannery was also retained in his role as scrum coach, while Felix Jones, who was forced to retire due to injury the previous season, joined the backroom team as a technical coach with a focus on attack. After CJ Stander deputised as captain for the previous season, Munster announced ahead of the season that Peter O'Mahony would reassume the role when he returned from injury. On 16 October 2016, Anthony Foley died suddenly in the Munster team hotel in Paris while on an away trip to play Racing 92 in the European Champions Cup.

Ulster announced in August 2016 that Rory Best would vacate the captaincy of the province. The Ireland captain was replaced in his role by Andrew Trimble, the team's record try-scorer, and Rob Herring, who took on the role in Best's absence the previous season.

=== Italy ===
After sacking head coach Umberto Casellato during the course of the previous season, Benetton Treviso hired former Canada head coach Kieran Crowley as his replacement. Marius Goosen, who served as coach following Casellato's dismissal, stayed with the side as Director of Rugby, the role he held before replacing Casellato.

After finishing ahead of Treviso in the previous season, Zebre played in top level European competition for the first time since the tournament format was changed at the end of the 2013–14 season. Zebre had the highest amount of changes to their squad in the competition with a total of 29 players either joining or departing the first team.

=== Scotland ===
After discussions of a possible move from Murrayfield to Easter Road in 2015 did not come to fruition, it was announced in May 2016 that Edinburgh had agreed a partnership with George Watson's College and would play their home fixtures at the school's 6,000 capacity Myreside venue in the second half of the season. It was also announced that the team would have the option of returning to Murrayfield for larger games. Edinburgh had previously used the ground as a home in its early years as a professional side and had played a home match there as recently as the 2015 Six Nations Championship. The off-season saw the loss of team captain Mike Coman, who left to join London Irish. With his departure, Grant Gilchrist and Stuart McInally took on the role in a joint capacity. On 28 September 2016, just four games into the season, Alan Solomons resigned as the team's head coach. The departure saw assistant coach Duncan Hodge promoted to acting head coach.

It was announced in October 2016 that this would be Gregor Townsend's last year in charge of Glasgow Warriors as he would depart at the end of the season to take up the role of Scotland head coach. After serving as the team's sole captain in 2015–16, Jonny Gray shared the role with Henry Pyrgos for the season. Following issues with the playing surface at the team's home stadium, Scotstoun, an artificial playing surface was installed at the ground.

=== Wales ===
This was the Welsh Regions' first full domestic season under a revised arrangement with the WRU.

Cardiff Blues head coach Danny Wilson made seven signings for next season with Kirby Myhill, George Earle and Steven Shingler joining from the Scarlets, Rhys Gill from Saracens, Nick Williams from Ulster, Matthew Morgan from Bristol and Willis Halaholo from the Hurricanes.

Newport Gwent Dragons parted company with director of rugby Lyn Jones and began the season with his long-time assistant Kingsley Jones promoted to head coach. Wales international Taulupe Faletau left the Dragons for Bath Rugby in the off-season. The season ended with Newport shareholders voting to pass ownership of the Dragons and the Rodney Parade ground to the WRU.

The Ospreys added Bradley Davies, Hugh Gustafson and former Scarlets forwards Rhodri Jones and Rob McCusker to their playing staff. Meanwhile Brad Davis joined the coaching group under Steve Tandy.

Scarlets entered their third season under head coach Wayne Pivac. The off-season saw the return of former player Jonathan Davies following a spell at Clermont Auvergne. Other new signings included Rhys Patchell, Werner Kruger and Jonathan Evans, while New Zealander Johnny McNicholl arrived later in the season.

== Table ==
2016–17 Pro12
	Team	P	W	D	L	PF	PA	PD	TF	TA	Try bonus	Losing bonus	Pts
1	(Ireland) Munster (RU)	22	19	0	3	602	316	+286	77	34	9	1	86
2	(Ireland) Leinster (SF)	22	18	0	4	674	390	+284	91	47	12	1	85
3	(Wales) Scarlets (CH)	22	17	0	5	537	359	+178	66	40	9	0	77
4	(Wales) Ospreys (SF)	22	14	0	8	556	360	+196	74	42	10	3	69
5	(Ireland) Ulster	22	14	1	7	521	371	+150	68	47	6	4	68
6	(Scotland) Glasgow Warriors	22	11	0	11	540	464	+76	72	53	9	5	58
7	(Wales) Cardiff Blues	22	11	1	10	508	498	+10	59	60	3	4	53
8	(Ireland) Connacht	22	9	0	13	413	498	−85	47	61	5	3	44
9	(Scotland) Edinburgh	22	6	0	16	400	491	−91	46	59	1	6	31
10	(Italy) Benetton Treviso	22	5	0	17	316	664	−348	35	92	1	2	23
11	(Wales) Newport Gwent Dragons	22	4	0	18	368	569	−201	38	71	1	6	23
12	(Italy) Zebre	22	3	0	19	318	773	−455	38	105	1	6	19
If teams are level at any stage, tiebreakers are applied in the following order: 1. number of matches won; 2. the difference between points for and points against; 3. the number of tries scored; 4. the most points scored; 5. the difference between tries for and tries against; 6. the fewest red cards received; 7. the fewest yellow cards received.
Green background (rows 1 to 4) are play-off places and earn a place in the 2017–18 European Rugby Champions Cup. Blue background indicates teams outside the play-off places that earn a place in the European Rugby Champions Cup. Yellow background advances to a play-off for a chance to compete in the Champions Cup. (Q) indicates team has qualified for the play-offs and has qualified for the 2017–18 European Rugby Champions Cup.

== Match summary ==
Teams play each other twice, once at home and once away.

Home \ Away	BEN	CAR	CON	EDI	GLA	LEI	MUN	NGD	OSP	SCA	ULS	ZEB
Benetton Treviso	—	28–34	19–34	21–6	28–35	14–40	14–34	27–11	13–5	6–22	11–22	23–12
Cardiff Blues	57–20	—	13–19	34–16	23–19	13–16	13–23	27–16	35–17	15–26	22–35	30–24
Connacht	47–8	18–7	—	28–15	5–41	24–37	9–16	14–9	11–32	8–30	30–25	33–3
Edinburgh	45–10	17–18	19–22	—	12–25	20–33	9–10	24–20	9–13	20–9	28–17	14–19
Glasgow Warriors	31–14	29–15	35–24	18–29	—	33–25	15–16	47–17	5–22	14–26	17–22	45–10
Leinster	20–8	22–21	24–13	39–10	31–30	—	25–14	28–15	31–19	45–9	22–7	70–6
Munster	46–3	23–24	50–14	28–14	10–7	29–17	—	45–17	33–0	21–30	22–20	49–5
Newport Gwent Dragons	26–8	24–26	21–16	27–19	17–26	22–54	16–20	—	0–10	16–21	17–27	11–6
Ospreys	64–10	46–24	29–17	31–22	26–15	18–20	23–25	35–17	—	19–9	24–10	59–5
Scarlets	51–5	15–10	17–8	26–10	27–3	38–29	13–23	31–27	40–17	—	16–13	42–7
Ulster	19–7	24–24	23–7	24–18	37–17	17–13	14–15	29–8	9–7	19–8	—	68–21
Zebre	3–19	21–23	25–22	19–24	28–33	10–33	14–50	29–14	10–40	24–31	17–40	—

Source: Pro12
Legend: Blue = home team win; Yellow = draw; Red = away team win.
For upcoming matches, an "a" indicates there is an article about the rivalry between the two participants.

== Rounds 1 to 22 ==
All times are local.

=== Round 1 ===
2 September 2016
19:35

Leinster (Ireland)	20–8	(Italy) Benetton Treviso
Try: Carbery (2) 2' c, 27' m Tracy 72' m Con: McFadden (1/3); Pen: McFadden (1/1) 32'	Report	Try: Fuser 36' m Pen: Allan (1/2) 51'

RDS Arena
Attendance: 11,217
Referee: Ben Whitehouse (WRU)

2 September 2016
19:35

(1 BP) Ospreys (Wales)	59–5	(Italy) Zebre
Try: Parry (3) 7' c, 39' c, 46' c Ashley 12' c Beck 24' c John (2) 58' c, 78' c Howells 74' c Con: S. Davies (8/8); Pen: S. Davies (1/1) 4'	Report	Try: D'Apice 34' m

Liberty Stadium
Attendance: 6,509
Referee: Andrew Brace (IRFU)

2 September 2016
19:35

(1 BP) Ulster (Ireland)	29–8	(Wales) Newport Gwent Dragons
Try: Lyttle (2) 21' c, 65' m Stockdale 26' m Pienaar 43' m Herring 71' c Con: Pienaar (2/5)	Report	Try: Howard 11' m Pen: Macleod (1/1) 5'

Kingspan Stadium
Attendance: 13,789
Referee: Marius Mitrea (FIR)

3 September 2016
15:00

Scarlets (Wales)	13–23	(Ireland) Munster
Try: G. Davies 31' c Con: Patchell (1/1); Pen: Patchell (2/4) 26', 47'	Report	Try: Cronin 18' c O'Mahony 29' c Con: Bleyendaal (2/2); Pen: Bleyendaal (2/3) 37', 53'; Keatley (1/1) 65'

Parc y Scarlets
Attendance: 6,107
Referee: Lloyd Linton (SRU)

3 September 2016
17:15

Connacht (Ireland)	5–41	(Scotland) Glasgow Warriors (1 BP)
Try: Adeolokun 32' m	Report	Try: Seymour (2) 10' m, 36' m Hogg 45' c Swinson 52' c Puafisi 58' c Lamont 70' c Con: Pyrgos (3/5); Clegg (1/1); Pen: Pyrgos (1/1) 24'

The Sportsground
Attendance: 6,063
Referee: Ian Davies (WRU)

3 September 2016
19:35

(1 BP) Cardiff Blues (Wales)	34–16	(Scotland) Edinburgh
Try: Shingler 8' c Penalty try 32' c N. Williams 60' c T. Williams 71' c Con: Shingler (2/2); Anscombe (2/2); Pen: Shingler (2/4) 27', 44'	Report	Try: Rasolea 15' c Con: Weir (1/1); Pen: Weir (3/5) 3', 19', 50'

BT Sport Cardiff Arms Park
Attendance: 4,807
Referee: John Lacey (IRFU)

=== Round 2 ===
9 September 2016
19:15

Newport Gwent Dragons (Wales)	11–6	(Italy) Zebre (1 BP)
Try: Howard 17' m Pen: Macleod (2/2) 29', 35'	Report	Pen: Canna (2/3) 9', 39'

Rodney Parade
Attendance: 4,454
Referee: Lloyd Linton (SRU)

9 September 2016
19:35

Edinburgh (Scotland)	20–9	(Wales) Scarlets
Try: Allen 32' c Bradbury 40' c Con: Weir (2/2); Pen: Weir (2/3) 18', 25'	Report	Pen: Patchell (3/4) 12', 28', 53'

Murrayfield Stadium
Attendance: 2,750
Referee: Andrew Brace (IRFU)

9 September 2016
19:35

(1 BP) Munster (Ireland)	23–24	(Wales) Cardiff Blues
Try: Conway 9' c Kilcoyne 61' c Con: Keatley (2/2); Pen: Keatley (3/3) 29', 54', 71'	Report	Try: James (2) 7' c, 35' c Fish 67' c Con: Anscombe (2/2); Shingler (1/1); Pen: Anscombe (1/2) 14'

Irish Independent Park
Attendance: 7,405
Referee: Ian Davies (WRU)

10 September 2016
15:00

(1 BP) Glasgow Warriors (Scotland)	33–25	(Ireland) Leinster
Try: Seymour (4) 15' m, 53' c, 55' c, 73' c Swinson 31' c Con: Pyrgos (4/5) 31', 53', 55', 73'	Report	Try: R. Kearney 25' c Van der Flier 37' c Kirchner 41' m Con: Carbery (2/3) 25', 37'; Pen: Carbery (2/2) 44', 63'

Scotstoun Stadium
Attendance: 7,251
Referee: John Lacey (IRFU)

10 September 2016
20:05

Benetton Treviso (Italy)	11–22	(Ireland) Ulster
Try: Benvenuti 80' m Pen: Allan (2/2) 29', 37'	Report	Try: Marshall 4' c Herring 54' m Pienaar 58' c Con: Pienaar (2/3) 4', 58'; Pen: Pienaar (1/1) 30'

Stadio Comunale di Monigo
Attendance: 2,800
Referee: Dudley Phillips (IRFU)

10 September 2016
19:35

Connacht (Ireland)	11–32	(Wales) Ospreys (1 BP)
Try: E. McKeon 57' m Pen: Carty (2/2) 20', 46'	Report	Try: Webb (2) 29' c, 74' c Ardron 71' m Hassler 77' c Con: S. Davies (3/4) 29', 74', 77'; Pen: S. Davies (2/2) 5', 63'

The Sportsground
Attendance: 5,749
Referee: Ben Whitehouse (WRU)

=== Round 3 ===
16 September 2016
19:00

Cardiff Blues (Wales)	23–19	(Scotland) Glasgow Warriors (1 BP)
Try: Cuthbert 23' c Lee-Lo 40' c Con: Anscombe (2/2); Pen: Anscombe (2/2) 2', 13'; Shingler (1/1) 77'	Report	Try: Hogg 26' c Horne 32' c Price 48' m Con: Clegg (2/3)

BT Sport Cardiff Arms Park
Attendance: 8,024
Referee: George Clancy (IRFU)

16 September 2016
19:05

Ulster (Ireland)	19–8	(Wales) Scarlets
Try: Ludik 18' m Henderson 79' m Pen: Jackson (3/3) 9', 16', 70'	Report	Try: Boyde 74' m Pen: Patchell (1/2) 47'

Kingspan Stadium
Attendance: 13,663
Referee: Ben Whitehouse (WRU)

16 September 2016
19:35

Edinburgh (Scotland)	20–33	(Ireland) Leinster (1 BP)
Try: Allen 1' m Watson 47' c Bradbury 73' m Con: Weir (1/3); Pen: Weir (1/1) 5'	Report	Try: Leavy (2) 12' c, 79' c Ringrose 18' c Nacewa 24' c Gibson-Park 35' m Con: Nacewa (4/5)

Murrayfield Stadium
Attendance: 3,484
Referee: David Wilkinson (IRFU)

17 September 2016
18:05

Zebre (Italy)	Postponed	(Ireland) Connacht

Stadio Sergio Lanfranchi
Referee: Ian Davies (WRU)

After 40 minutes of play, the match was "abandoned due to adverse weather conditions causing considerable risk to both the players and spectators". Zebre were leading 22–10 (3 tries to 1) when the match was abandoned. The game was rescheduled for 1 April 2017.

17 September 2016
17:15

(1 BP) Newport Gwent Dragons (Wales)	16–20	(Ireland) Munster
Try: Amos 32' c Con: O'Brien (1/1) 32'; Pen: O'Brien (3/3) 14', 49', 54'	Report	Try: Kleyn 20' c Bohane 56' c Con: Bleyendaal (2/2) 20', 56'; Pen: Bleyendaal (2/2) 11', 51'

Rodney Parade
Attendance: 3,841
Referee: Dudley Phillips (IRFU)

17 September 2016
19:35

(1 BP) Ospreys (Wales)	64–10	(Italy) Benetton Treviso
Try: John 22' c Parry 30' c Hassler 35' c Evans 37' c Howells 46' m Penalty try 54' c Giles 61' c Fia 67' c Jones 71' c Con: Davies (4/4) 22', 30', 35', 37'; Biggar (4/4) 54', 61', 67', 71'; Pen: Davies (1/1) 16'	Report	Try: Budd 80' c Con: McKinley (1/1) 80'; Pen: Allan (1/1) 18'

Liberty Stadium
Attendance: 6,760
Referee: Lloyd Linton (SRU)

=== Round 4 ===
23 September 2016
20:05

Benetton Treviso (Italy)	27–11	(Wales) Newport Gwent Dragons
Try: Benvenuti 26' c Paulo 48' c Fuser 79' c Con: Allan (3/3) 26', 48', 79'; Pen: Allan (2/2) 17', 64'	Report	Try: Landman 28' m Pen: O'Brien (2/2) 41', 67'

Stadio Comunale di Monigo
Attendance: 2,800
Referee: John Lacey (IRFU)

23 September 2016
19:35

(1 BP) Glasgow Warriors (Scotland)	17–22	(Ireland) Ulster
Try: Reid 19' c Seymour 57' c Con: Russell (2/2) 19', 57'; Pen: Russell (1/1) 48'	Report	Try: Cave 16' m Penalty try 39' c Jackson 62' c Con: Jackson (2/3) 39', 62'; Pen: Jackson (1/1) 6'

Scotstoun Stadium
Attendance: 7,351
Referee: Ian Davies (WRU)

23 September 2016
19:35

(1 BP) Leinster (Ireland)	31–19	(Wales) Ospreys
Try: Van der Flier (2) 19' c, 46' c Penalty try 34' c Sexton 40' c Con: Sexton (4/4) 19', 34', 40', 46'; Pen: Sexton (1/1) 5'	Report	Try: John 53' m Howells 72' c King 74' c Con: Biggar (2/3) 72', 74'

RDS Arena
Attendance: 13,357
Referee: Marius Mitrea (Italy)

24 September 2016
15:00

(1 BP) Munster (Ireland)	28–14	(Scotland) Edinburgh
Try: Murray (2) 27' c, 38' c Oliver 42' c O'Callaghan 57' c Con: Bleyendaal (4/4) 27', 38', 42', 57'	Report	Try: Dean 23' c Hardie 67' c Con: Weir (1/1) 23'; Kinghorn (1/1) 67'

Thomond Park
Attendance: 12,826
Referee: Ben Whitehouse (WRU)

24 September 2016
17:05

(1 BP) Zebre (Italy)	21–23	(Wales) Cardiff Blues
Try: Palazzani 12' m Bisegni 62' m Venditti 75' m Pen: Canna (1/1) 4'; Padovani (1/1) 40'	Report	Try: Scully 28' c Morgan 36' m James 46' m Con: Shingler (1/3) 28'; Pen: Shingler (2/2) 8', 23'

Stadio Sergio Lanfranchi
Attendance: 2,100
Referee: David Wilkinson (IRFU)

24 September 2016
19:35

Scarlets (Wales)	17–8	(Ireland) Connacht
Try: Li. Williams (2) 36' c, 66' c Con: Patchell (2/2) 36', 66'; Pen: Patchell (1/1) 71'	Report	Try: Adeolokun 22' m Pen: Carty (1/1) 40'

Parc y Scarlets
Attendance: 5,630
Referee: George Clancy (IRFU)

=== Round 5 ===
30 September 2016
19:35

(1 BP) Connacht (Ireland)	28–15	(Scotland) Edinburgh
Try: Adeolokun 9' c Roux 36' m Kelleher 45' m Robb 73' m Con: Carty (1/4); Pen: Carty (2/2) 17', 23'	Report	Try: Gilchrist 19' c Allen 70' m Con: Tovey (1/2); Pen: Tovey (1/1) 5'

The Sportsground
Attendance: 5,771
Referee: Nigel Owens (WRU)

30 September 2016
19:35

Newport Gwent Dragons (Wales)	17–26	(Scotland) Glasgow Warriors
Try: Hobbs 42' c Dixon 47' c Con: Macleod (2/2); Pen: Macleod (1/2) 33'	Report	Try: Flynn 28' c Allan 50' c Con: Russell (2/2); Pen: Russell (4/4) 9', 25', 35', 78'

Rodney Parade
Attendance: 4,809
Referee: Andrew Brace (IRFU)

1 October 2016
17:00

(1 BP) Munster (Ireland)	49–5	(Italy) Zebre
Try: Sweetnam 2' c Murray 22' c Stander (2) 28' c, 78' c Zebo 31' c Penalty try 52' c Archer 63' c Con: Bleyendaal (4/4); Keatley (3/3)	Report	Try: Di Giulio 71' m

Thomond Park
Attendance: 11,737
Referee: Dan Jones (WRU)

1 October 2016
18:30

Ulster (Ireland)	9–7	(Wales) Ospreys (1 BP)
Pen: Jackson (3/5) 28', 44', 79'	Report	Try: Smith 5' c Con: Biggar (1/1)

Kingspan Stadium
Attendance: 15,767
Referee: Ben Whitehouse (WRU)

1 October 2016
20:05

Benetton Treviso (Italy)	6–22	(Wales) Scarlets
Pen: Allan (2/3) 33'; 46'	Report	Try: Kruger 54' c Van der Merwe 69' m S. Evans 80' c Con: Patchell (1/2); Thomas (1/1); Pen: Patchell (1/2) 43'

Stadio Comunale di Monigo
Attendance: 3,500
Referee: Gary Conway (IRFU)

1 October 2016
19:35

(1 BP) Cardiff Blues (Wales)	13–16	(Ireland) Leinster
Try: Anscombe 31' c Con: Anscombe (1/1); Pen: Anscombe (2/3) 26', 35'	Report	Try: Ruddock 49' c Con: Sexton (1/1); Pen: Sexton (3/4) 19', 44', 70'

BT Cardiff Arms Park
Attendance: 8,289
Referee: Dudley Phillips (IRFU)

=== Round 6 ===
7 October 2016
19:35

(1 BP) Connacht (Ireland)	30–25	(Ireland) Ulster (1 BP)
Try: Carty 2' c Kelleher (2) 23' m, 52' m Connolly 25' c Con: Carty (2/4); Pen: Carty (2/2) 37', 59'	Report	Try: Gilroy 33' m Best 41' c Payne 44' c Con: Jackson (2/3); Pen: Jackson (2/2) 5', 65'

The Sportsground
Attendance: 6,194
Referee: Gary Conway (IRFU)

7 October 2016
19:35

(1 BP) Edinburgh (Scotland)	45–10	(Italy) Benetton Treviso
Try: Hoyland (2) 3' c, 28' m Watson 6' c Bradbury 31' c Brown (2) 46' m, 69' c Kinghorn 80' m Con: Tovey (5/7)	Report	Try: Fuser 43' c Con: Allan (1/1); Pen: Allan (1/1) 20'

Murrayfield Stadium
Attendance: 3,125
Referee: Ian Davies (WRU)

7 October 2016
19:35

(1 BP) Ospreys (Wales)	46–24	(Wales) Cardiff Blues
Try: A. Jones 21' c Walker (2) 27' m, 30' c Arhip 38' m John 40' c Evans 45' m Matavesi 64' c Con: S. Davies (3/6); Biggar (1/1); Pen: S. Davies (1/1) 12'	Report	Try: Dacey 15' c James 62' c Lee-Lo 74' c Con: Anscombe (3/3); Pen: Anscombe (1/1) 10'

Liberty Stadium
Attendance: 10,860
Referee: Nigel Owens (WRU)

8 October 2016
14:05

Leinster (Ireland)	25–14	(Ireland) Munster
Try: Nacewa (2) 35' m, 55' c Gibson-Park 68' c Con: Sexton (1/1) 55'; Nacewa (1/1) 68'; Pen: Sexton (2/2) 6', 10'	Report	Try: O'Mahony 26' c Taute 74' c Con: Bleyendaal (2/2) 26', 74'

Aviva Stadium
Attendance: 40,527
Referee: David Wilkinson (IRFU)

8 October 2016
17:05

(1 BP) Zebre (Italy)	28–33	(Scotland) Glasgow Warriors (1 BP)
Try: Fabiani 29' m Venditti 55' c Van Schalkwyk 74' c Con: Canna (2/3) 55', 74'; Pen: Canna (3/3) 2', 18', 80'	Report	Try: Lamont (2) 7' m, 46' c Brown 39' c Sarto 52' m Con: Clegg (2/4) 39', 46'; Pen: Clegg (3/3) 25', 27', 79'

Stadio Sergio Lanfranchi
Attendance: 2,001
Referee: Lloyd Linton (SRU)

8 October 2016
19:35

(1BP) Scarlets (Wales)	31–27	(Wales) Newport Gwent Dragons (2BP)
Try: S. Evans (2) 2' c, 65' c Li. Williams 37' c J. Evans 60' c Con: Patchell (4/4) 2', 37', 60', 65'; Pen: Patchell (1/1) 54'	Report	Try: Amos 13' c Warren (2) 31' m, 35' m Pretorius 72' c Con: Macleod (1/1) 13'; O'Brien (1/1) 72'; Pen: Macleod (1/1) 27'

Parc y Scarlets
Attendance: 6,358
Referee: Ben Whitehouse (WRU)

=== Round 7 ===
28 October 2016
19:35

(1 BP) Ulster (Ireland)	14–15	(Ireland) Munster
Try: Piutau 4' c Lyttle 34' c Con: Jackson (2/2) 5', 35'	Report	Try: Scannell 40' m Taute 63' c Con: Scannell (1/2) 64'; Drop: Scannell (1/1) 74'

Kingspan Stadium
Attendance: 17,629
Referee: Nigel Owens (WRU)

28 October 2016
19:35

Cardiff Blues (Wales)	15–26	(Wales) Scarlets (1 BP)
Try: James 12' c Scully 66' m Con: Shingler (1/2) 12'; Pen: Shingler (1/1) 47'	Report	Try: Shingler 8' c Evans 10' c Van der Merwe 24' c Parkes 41' m Con: Patchell (3/4) 8', 11', 24'

BT Cardiff Arms Park
Attendance: 9,442
Referee: Lloyd Linton (SRU)

28 October 2016
19:35

(1 BP) Edinburgh (Scotland)	14–19	(Italy) Zebre
Try: Ford 63' c McCallum 68' c Con: Kinghorn (1/1) 64'; Hidalgo-Clyne (1/1) 69'	Report	Try: Venditti 79' c Con: Canna (1/1) 80'; Pen: Canna (4/5) 4', 27' 40', 51'

Murrayfield Stadium
Attendance: 3,304
Referee: Marius Mitrea (FIR)

28 October 2016
19:35

(1 BP) Glasgow Warriors (Scotland)	31–14	(Italy) Benetton Treviso
Try: Gray 9' c Bennett 13' m Hughes (2) 28' c, 47' m Dunbar 39' c Con: Russell (3/5) 9', 29', 40'.	Report	Try: Penalty try 24' c Giazzon 64' c Con: McKinley (1/1) 24'; Allan (1/1) 65'

Scotstoun Stadium
Attendance: 7,251
Referee: David Wilkinson (IRFU)

29 October 2016
15:00

(1 BP) Ospreys (Wales)	35–17	(Wales) Newport Gwent Dragons
Try: Habberfield 21' c Baldwin 39' c Giles (2) 43' c, 56' c Leonard 73' c Con: Matavesi (5/5) 22', 40, 44', 56', 74'	Report	Try: Screech 76' c Howard 80' c Con: G. Jones (2/2) 77', 80'; Pen: Macleod (1/1) 3'

Liberty Stadium
Attendance: 9,103
Referee: Ben Whitehouse (WRU)

29 October 2016
17:15

Leinster (Ireland)	24–13	(Ireland) Connacht
Try: Byrne 49' m Daly 75' c Con: Nacewa (1/2) 76'; Pen: Nacewa (4/4) 23', 32', 38', 58'	Report	Try: Delahunt 80' c Con: Carty (1/1) 80'; Pen: Ronaldson (2/2) 4', 13'

RDS Arena
Attendance: 18,200
Referee: John Lacey (IRFU)

=== Round 8 ===
4 November 2016
20:15

(2 BP) Benetton Treviso (Italy)	28–34	(Wales) Cardiff Blues
Try: Budd 13' c Sgarbi 17' c Tagicakibau 33' c B. Steyn 46' c Con: McKinley (4/4) 13', 17', 33', 46'	Report	Try: R. Williams 6' c Cook 51' m Halaholo 64' c Con: Shingler (2/3) 6', 64'; Pen: Shingler (5/5) 22', 27', 37', 57', 77'

Stadio Comunale di Monigo
Attendance: 3,206
Referee: Ian Davies (WRU)

4 November 2016
19:15

Newport Gwent Dragons (Wales)	21–16	(Ireland) Connacht (1 BP)
Try: Hewitt (2) 14' c, 46' m Con: O'Brien (1/2) 14'; Pen: O'Brien (1/1) 21'; Drop: O'Brien (2/2) 36', 52'	Report	Try: Adeolokun 69' c Con: Carty (1/1) 69'; Pen: Carty (3/3) 25', 39', 59'

Rodney Parade
Attendance: 4,522
Referee: George Clancy (IRFU)

4 November 2016
19:35

Edinburgh (Scotland)	28–17	(Ireland) Ulster
Try: Mata 3' c Hoyland 10' m Bradbury 47' c Con: Tovey (2/3) 3', 47'; Pen: Kinghorn (1/1) 17'; Weir (2/2) 29', 35'	Report	Try: Cairns 67' c Stockdale 72' c Con: Pienaar (2/2) 67', 72'; Pen: Pienaar (1/1) 26'

Murrayfield Stadium
Attendance: 3,556
Referee: Andrew Brace (IRFU)

4 November 2016
19:35

(1 BP) Munster (Ireland)	33–0	(Wales) Ospreys
Try: Kilcoyne (2) 8' c, 69' c Sweetnam 14' c O'Mahony 54' m Copeland 78' c Con: Bleyendaal (4/5) 8', 14', 69', 78'	Report

Irish Independent Park
Attendance: 8,008
Referee: Marius Mitrea (FIR)

5 November 2016
17:05

Zebre (Italy)	10–33	(Ireland) Leinster (1 BP)
Try: Van Schalkwyk 16' c Con: Canna (1/1) 17'; Pen: Canna (1/2) 31'	Report	Try: Penalty try 22' c Byrne (3) 34' m, 48' c, 64' c Conan 55' c Con: Nacewa (4/5) 23', 49', 56', 65'.

Stadio Sergio Lanfranchi
Attendance: 1,500
Referee: Nigel Owens (WRU)

5 November 2016
19:35

Scarlets (Wales)	27–3	(Scotland) Glasgow Warriors
Try: Boyde (2) 15' c, 52' c Evans 41' c Con: Patchell (3/3) 16', 42', 54'; Pen: Patchell (2/2) 49', 56'	Report	Pen: Horne (1/3) 32'

Parc y Scarlets
Attendance: 6,059
Referee: Gary Conway (IRFU)

=== Round 9 ===
25 November 2016
19:35

Connacht (Ireland)	18–7	(Wales) Cardiff Blues
Try: Cooney 15' c Aki 56' m Con: Cooney (1/2) 16'; Pen: Cooney (2/2) 40', 49'	Report	Try: James 17' c Con: Shingler (1/1) 18'

The Sportsground
Attendance: 6,190
Referee: Nigel Owens (WRU)

25 November 2016
19:35

Glasgow Warriors (Scotland)	5–22	(Wales) Ospreys (1 BP)
Try: Bulumakau 78' m	Report	Try: Habberfield 36' m O'Flaherty 49' m Baker 52' m Beck 67' c Con: Matavesi (1/4) 68'

Scotstoun Stadium
Attendance: 7,166
Referee: George Clancy (IRFU)

25 November 2016
19:35

(1 BP) Scarlets (Wales)	38–29	(Ireland) Leinster (1 BP)
Try: McNicholl 7' c Kruger 21' c Evans 31' c Boyde 42' c Elias 51' c Con: Patchell (5/5) 8', 22', 32', 43', 53'; Pen: D. Jones (1/1) 71'	Report	Try: Strauss 38' m Byrne 52' c Daly 59' c Porter 80' c Con: Nacewa (3/4) 52', 59', 80'; Pen: Nacewa (1/1) 26'

Parc y Scarlets
Attendance: 6,164
Referee: Sean Gallagher (IRFU)

25 November 2016
19:35

Ulster (Ireland)	Postponed	(Italy) Zebre

Kingspan Stadium
Referee: Craig Evans (WRU)

Postponed prior to kickoff due to frozen pitch. Game rescheduled on 11 March 2017.

26 November 2016
14:00

(1 BP) Munster (Ireland)	46–3	(Italy) Benetton Treviso
Try: Copeland 20' c Conway (2) 25' m, 34' c O'Shea 42' c R. O'Mahony (2) 64' m, 71' m Wootton 69' c Con: Bleyendaal (3/5) 21', 35', 43'; Keatley (1/2) 69'; Pen: Bleyendaal (1/1) 14'	Report	Pen: McKinley (1/1) 8'

Thomond Park
Attendance: 12,196
Referee: Mike Adamson (SRU)

27 November 2016
15:30

Newport Gwent Dragons (Wales)	27–19	(Scotland) Edinburgh
Try: Meyer 18' c Hobbs 23' c O'Brien 27'; Con: O'Brien (3/3) 19', 23', 28'; Pen: O'Brien (2/3) 12', 78'	Report	Try: Manu 9' c Dean 26' m Mata 64' c Con: Tovey (1/2) 10'; Weir (1/1) 65'

Rodney Parade
Attendance: 4,064
Referee: Frank Murphy (IRFU)

=== Round 10 ===
2 December 2016
19:35

(1 BP) Glasgow Warriors (Scotland)	15–16	(Ireland) Munster
Try: Price 62' c Grigg 70' m Con: Clegg (1/2) 62'; Pen: Horne (1/1) 16'	Report	Try: Conway 12' c Con: Keatley (1/1) 12'; Pen: Keatley (2/2) 9', 37'; Drop: Keatley (1/1) 77'

Scotstoun Stadium
Attendance: 7,351
Referee: Nigel Owens (WRU)

2 December 2016
19:35

(1 BP) Ospreys (Wales)	31–22	(Scotland) Edinburgh
Try: Howells 13' c Baker 18' c Fia 33' c Giles 45' c Con: S. Davies (4/4) 13', 18', 33', 45'; Pen: S. Davies (1/1) 6'	Report	Try: Helu 8' m Kinghorn 28' c Mata 78' c Con: Weir (2/3) 28', 78'; Pen: Weir (1/1) 40'

Liberty Stadium
Attendance: 7,684
Referee: Dudley Phillips (IRFU)

3 December 2016
15:05

(1 BP) Zebre (Italy)	24–31	(Wales) Scarlets (1 BP)
Try: Van Schalkwyk 64' c Venditti 71' m Con: Canna (1/2) 64'; Pen: Canna (2/2) 13', 80'; Drop: Canna (2/2) 2', 21'	Report	Try: J. Evans (2) 13' c, 51' m A. Shingler 34' c Van der Merwe 39' c A. Thomas 46' m Con: Patchell (3/3) 13', 34', 39'

Stadio Sergio Lanfranchi
Attendance: 1,800
Referee: David Wilkinson (IRFU)

3 December 2016
15:00

(1 BP) Connacht (Ireland)	47–8	(Italy) Benetton Treviso
Try: McCartney (2) 14' c, 32' c Poolman 26' c Buckley 38' c Cooney 50' c Heffernan 55' m Carty 74' c Con: Cooney (4/4) 14', 26', 32', 38'; Boshoff (1/1) 50'; Carty (1/2) 74'	Report	Try: Flammini 67' c Con: McKinley (1/1) 5'

The Sportsground
Attendance: 5,903
Referee: Ian Davies (WRU)

3 December 2016
17:15

Cardiff Blues (Wales)	22–35	(Ireland) Ulster (1 BP)
Try: Dacey 40' m Halaholo 70' c Cuthbert 74' c Con: Robinson (2/3) 70', 74'; Pen: Shingler (1/1) 5'	Report	Try: Piutau 25' c McCloskey 29' c McCall 37' c Henry 62' c Ludik 75' c Con: Pienaar (5/5) 25', 29', 37', 62', 75'

BT Cardiff Arms Park
Attendance: 6,010
Referee: Andrew Brace (IRFU)

3 December 2016
19:35

(1 BP) Leinster (Ireland)	28–15	(Wales) Newport Gwent Dragons
Try: Dooley 12' c Molony 14' c Conan 31' c Carbery 42' c Con: Nacewa (4/4) 12', 14', 31', 42'	Report	Try: Howard 55' m Pretorius 70' c Con: O'Brien (1/2) 70'; Pen: O'Brien (1/1) 14'

RDS Arena
Attendance: 10,979
Referee: Marius Mitrea (FIR)

=== Round 11 ===
23 December 2016
19:35

Benetton Treviso (Italy)	23–12	(Italy) Zebre
Try: Allan 58' c Sperandio 75' c Con: Allan (2/2) 60', 76'; Pen: Allan (3/4) 19', 40', 52'	Report	Try: Van Schalkwyk 33' c Van Zyl 78' m Con: Canna (1/2) 34'

Stadio Comunale di Monigo
Attendance: 3,000
Referee: Marius Mitrea (FIR)

23 December 2016
19:35

Ulster (Ireland)	23–7	(Ireland) Connacht
Try: McCloskey 26' c Ross 52' c Con: Jackson (2/2) 28', 53'; Pen: Jackson (3/3) 20', 36', 67'	Report	Try: Carty 55'; Con: Carty (1/1) 56'

Kingspan Stadium
Attendance: 17,613
Referee: George Clancy (IRFU)

26 December 2016
14:05

Cardiff Blues (Wales)	27–16	(Wales) Newport Gwent Dragons
Try: Shingler 1' c Dacey 32' c Navidi 39' c Con: Shingler (3/3) 2', 33', 40'; Pen: Shingler (2/2) 14', 21'	Report	Try: Hewitt 23' c Con: O'Brien (1/1) 23'; Pen: O'Brien (3/3) 11', 19', 35'

BT Cardiff Arms Park
Attendance: 11,654
Referee: Ben Whitehouse (WRU)

26 December 2016
17:30

(1 BP) Munster (Ireland)	29–17	(Ireland) Leinster
Try: Zebo 22' c R. O'Mahony 40' c O'Donnell 49' c Stander 56' m Con: Bleyendaal (3/4) 23', 40', 51'; Pen: Bleyendaal (1/1) 61'	Report	Try: Kirchner 17' c Strauss 76' c Con: Nacewa (1/1) 18'; Molony (1/1) 77'; Pen: Nacewa (1/1) 27'

Thomond Park
Attendance: 26,200
Referee: Nigel Owens (WRU)

27 December 2016
15:00

Ospreys (Wales)	19–9	(Wales) Scarlets
Try: Penalty try 53' c Con: Biggar (1/1) 54'; Pen: Biggar (4/5) 14', 40', 59', 71'	Report	Pen: Patchell (3/3) 17', 33', 38'

Liberty Stadium
Attendance: 19,514
Referee: Andrew Brace (IRFU)

==== 1872 Cup 1st round ====
26 December 2016
16:05

Edinburgh (Scotland)	12–25	(Scotland) Glasgow Warriors
Pen: Weir (4/4) 7', 22', 52', 59'	Report	Try: Bulumakau 1' m Strauss 33' c Dunbar 66' c Con: Russell (2/3) 34', 67'; Pen: Russell (1/2) 40'; Drop: Russell (1/1) 56'

Murrayfield Stadium
Attendance: 21,036
Referee: Ian Davies (WRU)

=== Round 12 ===
31 December 2016
12:00

(1 BP) Zebre (Italy)	19–24	(Scotland) Edinburgh
Try: Boni 24' c Canna 61' m Van Schalkwyk 79' c Con: Canna (2/3) 26', 80'	Report	Try: Dean 38' c Helu 54' m Con: Weir (1/2) 40'; Pen: Weir (4/4) 13', 29', 65', 74'

Stadio Sergio Lanfranchi
Attendance: 2,000
Referee: Gary Conway (IRFU)

31 December 2016
14:05

(1 BP) Benetton Treviso (Italy)	28–35	(Scotland) Glasgow Warriors (1 BP)
Try: Sperandio 1' m Budd (2) 32' c, 73' c Con: Allan (1/2) 33'; McKinley (1/1) 74'; Pen: Allan (2/4) 40', 48'; McKinley (1/2) 61'	Report	Try: Hogg 15' c Seymour 17' c Ashe 28' c Grigg 50' c Clegg 75' c Con: Hogg (5/5) 16', 18', 29', 51', 76'

Stadio Comunale di Monigo
Attendance: 2,800
Referee: Elia Rizzo (FIR)

31 December 2016
15:00

Leinster (Ireland)	22–7	(Ireland) Ulster
Try: O'Loughlin (2) 6' c, 41' m L. McGrath 32' c Con: Nacewa (2/3) 7', 33'; Pen: Nacewa (1/1) 17'	Report	Try: Piutau 76' c Con: Pienaar (1/1) 76'

RDS Arena
Attendance: 18,200
Referee: John Lacey (IRFU)

31 December 2016
17:30

(1 BP) Connacht (Ireland)	9–16	(Ireland) Munster
Pen: Carty (3/4) 30', 50', 76'	Report	Try: Marshall 56' c Con: Keatley (1/1) 57'; Pen: Keatley (2/3) 2', 39'; Drop: Keatley (1/2) 68'

The Sportsground
Attendance: 8,090
Referee: David Wilkinson (IRFU)

1 January 2017
15:00

Scarlets (Wales)	15–10	(Wales) Cardiff Blues (1 BP)
Try: S. Evans 11' m S. Williams 46' c Con: Patchell (1/2) 46'; Pen: Patchell (1/2) 30'	Report	Try: Halaholo 53' c Con: Shingler (1/1) 54'; Pen: Shingler (1/1) 33'

Parc y Scarlets
Attendance: 10,159
Referee: Nigel Owens (WRU)

1 January 2017
17:05

Newport Gwent Dragons (Wales)	0–10	(Wales) Ospreys
	Report	Try: Tipuric 12' c Con: Biggar (1/1) 13'; Pen: Biggar (1/1) 72'

Rodney Parade
Attendance: 6,746
Referee: Ian Davies (WRU)

=== Round 13 ===
6 January 2017
19:15

Newport Gwent Dragons (Wales)	26–8	(Italy) Benetton Treviso
Try: Pretorius 26' c Evans 68' c Con: O'Brien (2/2) 27', 68'; Pen: O'Brien (3/3) 5', 40', 54'; Drop: O'Brien (1/1) 50'	Report	Try: Tebaldi 7' m Pen: Allan (1/1) 23'

Rodney Parade
Attendance: 3,904
Referee: Mike Adamson (SRU)

6 January 2017
19:35

(1 BP) Leinster (Ireland)	70–6	(Italy) Zebre
Try: O'Brien 4' c Triggs 17' c L. McGrath 25' c Healy 29' c O'Loughlin (3) 40' c, 68' c, 71' c Ringrose (2) 47' c, 74' c Heaslip 79' c Con: Sexton (6/6) 5', 19', 26', 30', 40', 48'; R. Byrne (4/4) 68', 72', 75', 80'	Report	Pen: Padovani (2/2) 14', 24'

RDS Arena
Attendance: 10,821
Referee: Dan Jones (WRU)

6 January 2017
19:35

Scarlets (Wales)	16–13	(Ireland) Ulster (1 BP)
Try: Penalty try 61' c Con: D. Jones (1/1) 61'; Pen: D. Jones (3/3) 10', 13', 52'	Report	Try: Stockdale 20' c Con: Jackson (1/1) 21'; Pen: Jackson (2/2) 16', 40'

Parc y Scarlets
Attendance: 6,593
Referee: Marius Mitrea (FIR)

7 January 2017
13:30

(1 BP) Ospreys (Wales)	29–7	(Ireland) Connacht
Try: Baker 11' c Cracknell 13' c Smith 56' c Beck 79' m Con: S. Davies (3/3) 12', 14', 57'; Pen: S. Davies (1/1) 44'	Report	Try: O'Brien 75' c Con: Cooney (1/1) 77'

Liberty Stadium
Attendance: 6,669
Referee: John Lacey (IRFU)

7 January 2017
19:35

(1 BP) Glasgow Warriors (Scotland)	29–15	(Wales) Cardiff Blues
Try: MacArthur 12' c Murchie (2) 48' c, 55' c Malcolm 64' m Con: Russell (3/4) 13', 49', 56'; Pen: Russell (1/1) 34'	Report	Try: Scully 38' c R. Williams 77' m Con: Shingler (1/2) 40'; Pen: Shingler (1/1) 42'

Scotstoun Stadium
Attendance: 7,251
Referee: Andrew Brace (IRFU)

3 February 2017
19:35

(1 BP) Edinburgh (Scotland)	9–10	(Ireland) Munster
Pen: Tovey (3/3) 7', 24', 34'	Report	Try: O'Mahony 15' c Con: Bleyendaal (1/1) 16'; Pen: Bleyendaal 66'

New Myreside
Attendance: 5,235
Referee: Ben Whitehouse (WRU)

=== Round 14 ===
10 February 2017
20:00

Zebre (Italy)	10–40	(Wales) Ospreys (1 BP)
Try: Boni 8' c Con: Palazzani (1/1) 8'; Pen: Palazzani (1/1) 13'	Report	Try: Beck 41' c Evans (3) 44' c, 46' c, 50' m Parry 61' c Howells 77' c Con: Price (5/6) 41', 44', 46', 61', 77'

Stadio Sergio Lanfranchi
Attendance: 1,500
Referee: David Wilkinson (IRFU)

10 February 2017
19:35

(1 BP) Munster (Ireland)	45–17	(Wales) Newport Gwent Dragons
Try: Taute (2) 14' c, 28' c Conway 20' c Penalty try 40' c Kilcoyne 64' c R. O'Mahony 80' c Con: Bleyendaal (6/6) 14', 20', 28', 40', 64', 80'; Pen: Bleyendaal (1/1) 7'	Report	Try: Buckley 36' c Dee 60' c Con: D. Jones (2/2) 36', 60'; Pen: D. Jones (1/1) 12'

Irish Independent Park
Attendance: 8,008
Referee: Mike Adamson (SRU)

10 February 2017
19:35

Glasgow Warriors (Scotland)	14–26	(Wales) Scarlets
Try: MacArthur 16' m Pen: Clegg (3/3) 3', 27', 49'	Report	Try: T. Williams 22' c Ja. Davies 39' c Con: T. Williams (1/1) 22'; D. Jones (1/1) 39'; Pen: D. Jones (3/3) 7', 30', 55'; Thomas (1/1) 76'

Scotstoun Stadium
Attendance: 7,166
Referee: George Clancy (IRFU)

10 February 2017
19:35

(1 BP) Ulster (Ireland)	24–18	(Scotland) Edinburgh (1 BP)
Try: P. Marshall 10' c Cave 19' m Ludik 27' m Stockdale 33' c Con: Nelson (2/4) 10', 33'	Report	Try: Bradbury 2' m McInally 36' m Hoyland 58' m Pen: Hidalgo-Clyne (1/1) 65'

Kingspan Stadium
Attendance: 15,462
Referee: Nigel Owens (WRU)

12 February 2017
13:30

Benetton Treviso (Italy)	14–40	(Ireland) Leinster (1 BP)
Try: Paulo 36' c Pratichetti 55' c Con: McKinley (2/2) 36', 55'	Report	Try: O'Loughlin 2' c D. Kearney (2) 25' c, 28' c A. Byrne 51' c Carbery 66' m B. Byrne 72' c Con: R. Byrne (5/6) 2', 25', 28', 51', 72'

Stadio Comunale di Monigo
Attendance: 1,600
Referee: Dan Jones (WRU)

12 February 2017
17:05

(1 BP) Cardiff Blues (Wales)	13–19	(Ireland) Connacht
Try: N. Williams 28' c Con: Anscombe (1/1) 28'; Pen: Anscombe (2/2) 12', 20'	Report	Try: Healy 39' c Con: Cooney (1/1) 39'; Pen: Cooney (2/2) 44', 64'; Ronaldson (1/1) 80'; Drop: O'Halloran (1/1) 78'

BT Sport Cardiff Arms Park
Attendance: 4,300
Referee: Marius Mitrea (FIR)

=== Round 15 ===
17 February 2017
19:35

(1 BP) Leinster (Ireland)	39–10	(Scotland) Edinburgh
Try: Daly (2) 10' m, 56' m Carbery (2) 48' m, 53' c Leavy 67' c B. Byrne 71' c Con: R. Byrne (3/5) 53', 67', 71'; Pen: Carbery (1/1) 33'	Report	Try: Weir 70'; Con: Weir (1/1) 70'; Pen: Weir (1/1) 36'

RDS Arena
Attendance: 11,445
Referee: Ian Davies (WRU)

17 February 2017
19:35

(1 BP) Scarlets (Wales)	42–7	(Italy) Zebre
Try: S. Evans 13' c Shingler 29' c T. Williams 34' c Price 50' c Penalty try 64' c Boyde 73' c Con: D. Jones (5/5) 13', 29', 34', 50', 64'; Thomas (1/1) 73'	Report	Try: Bellini 24' c Con: Violi (1/1) 24'

Parc y Scarlets
Attendance: 5,989
Referee: Andrew Brace (IRFU)

18 February 2017
14:30

(1 BP) Cardiff Blues (Wales)	57–20	(Italy) Benetton Treviso
Try: N. Williams 4' c Scully 39' c Shingler 41' c Bennett 45' c Dacey 50' c Halaholo 56' c Morgan 66' c Cuthbert 79' m Con: Shingler (7/8) 4', 39', 41', 45', 50', 56', 66'; Pen: Shingler (1/1) 31'	Report	Try: McKinley 36' c Esposito 53' c Con: Tebaldi (2/2) 36', 53'; Pen: Tebaldi (2/2) 10', 15'

BT Sport Cardiff Arms Park
Attendance: 5,963
Referee: John Lacey (IRFU)

18 February 2017
15:00

(1 BP) Ulster (Ireland)	37–17	(Scotland) Glasgow Warriors
Try: Bowe 22' m Penalty try 33' c Stockdale (2) 49' c, 78' c Pienaar 53' m Con: Pienaar (3/5) 33', 49', 78'; Pen: Pienaar (2/2) 10', 45'	Report	Try: Thomson 40' m Cummings (2) 69' m, 74' c Con: Thomson (1/3) 74'

Kingspan Stadium
Attendance: 16,545
Referee: Dan Jones (WRU)

18 February 2017
17:15

(1 BP) Ospreys (Wales)	23–25	(Ireland) Munster
Try: Dirksen 5' c Fonotia 13' c Con: S. Davies (2/2) 5', 13'; Pen: S. Davies (3/3) 24', 40', 59'	Report	Try: O'Donoghue 36' m Saili 40' c Kilcoyne 78' c Con: Bleyendaal (2/3) 40', 78'; Pen: Bleyendaal (2/2) 4', 29'

Liberty Stadium
Attendance: 8,782
Referee: Marius Mitrea (FIR)

18 February 2017
19:35

Connacht (Ireland)	14–9	(Wales) Newport Gwent Dragons (1 BP)
Try: O'Halloran 5' c Blade 13' c Con: Ronaldson (2/2) 5', 13'	Report	Pen: O'Brien (3/3) 18', 42', 53'

The Sportsground
Attendance: 6,190
Referee: Nigel Owens (WRU)

=== Round 16 ===
24 February 2017
19:05

(1 BP) Edinburgh (Scotland)	17–18	(Wales) Cardiff Blues
Try: Cochrane 16' c Scholes (2) 48' m, 55' m Con: Hidalgo-Clyne (1/3) 16'	Report	Try: Bennett 61' c L. Williams 72' m Con: Shingler (1/2) 61'; Pen: Shingler (2/2) 8', 21'

New Myreside
Attendance: 3,675
Referee: David Wilkinson (IRFU)

24 February 2017
19:30

Newport Gwent Dragons (Wales)	22–54	(Ireland) Leinster (1 BP)
Try: Hughes 46' c Screech 67' m Pretorius 77' c Con: D. Jones (2/3) 46', 77'; Pen: D. Jones (1/1) 6'	Report	Try: Conan (2) 11' c, 24' c Gibson-Park 42' c Strauss 54' c Tracy 63' m Triggs 68' c L. McGrath (2) 71' c, 75' c Con: R. Byrne (7/8) 11', 24', 42', 54', 68', 71', 75'

Rodney Parade
Attendance: 4,059
Referee: Marius Mitrea (FIR)

24 February 2017
19:35

Munster (Ireland)	21–30	(Wales) Scarlets
Try: Taute 13' c Sweetnam 23' c Oliver 30' c Con: Bleyendaal (3/3) 13', 23', 30'	Report	Try: Parkes 56' c McNicholl 59' c Van der Merwe 62' c Con: D. Jones (3/3) 56', 59', 62'; Pen: D. Jones (3/3) 3', 16', 53'

Thomond Park
Attendance: 16,742
Referee: Daniel Jones (WRU)

26 February 2017
13:30

Benetton Treviso (Italy)	19–34	(Ireland) Connacht (1 BP)
Try: Buondonno 37' m Sperandio 70' c Odiete 75' c Con: Tebaldi (1/1) 71'; Buondonno (1/1) 75' c	Report	Try: Blade 27' c Bealham 31' c Ronaldson 47' c O'Halloran 60' c Con: Ronaldson (3/3) 27', 31', 47'; Carty (1/1) 60'; Pen: Ronaldson (2/2) 15', 21'

Stadio Comunale di Monigo
Attendance: 1,500
Referee: Ian Davies (WRU)

26 February 2017
13:30

Zebre (Italy)	17–40	(Ireland) Ulster (1 BP)
Try: Palazzani 17' c Bellini 59' c Con: Palazzani (2/2) 17', 59'; Pen: Palazzani (1/1) 36'	Report	Try: Henry 7' c Pienaar 14' c Olding 45' c Stockdale 51' c Diack 71' c Busby 78' m Con: Pienaar (5/6) 7', 14', 45', 51', 71'

Stadio Sergio Lanfranchi
Attendance: 2,000
Referee: Sean Gallagher (IRFU)

26 February 2017
17:05

(1 BP) Ospreys (Wales)	26–15	(Scotland) Glasgow Warriors
Try: Giles 10' c Matavesi 22' c Ardron 56' c Fonotia 57' m Con: Price (3/4) 10', 22', 56'	Report	Try: Flynn 25' c Murchie 52' m Con: Thomson (1/2) 25'; Pen: Thomson (1/1) 47'

Liberty Stadium
Attendance: 7,140
Referee: Frank Murphy (IRFU)

=== Round 17 ===
3 March 2017
19:35

(1 BP) Connacht (Ireland)	33–3	(Italy) Zebre
Try: Adeolokun 8' c Dawai 26' m Muldoon 61' c Penalty try 66' c Stevenson 75' c Con: Cooney (1/2) 8'; O'Halloran (2/2) 61', 66'; Ronaldson (1/1) 75'	Report	Pen: Palazzani (1/1) 45'

The Sportsground
Attendance: 4,091
Referee: Marius Mitrea (FIR)

3 March 2017
19:35

(1 BP) Edinburgh (Scotland)	9–13	(Wales) Ospreys
Pen: Weir (3/3) 15', 63', 72'	Report	Try: Matavesi 20' c Con: S. Davies (1/1) 21'; Pen: S. Davies (2/2) 18', 69'

New Myreside
Attendance: 4,834
Referee: George Clancy (IRFU)

3 March 2017
19:35

Ulster (Ireland)	19–7	(Italy) Benetton Treviso
Try: Payne 20' c Reidy 52' c Piutau 57' m Con: Pienaar (2/3) 21', 53'	Report	Try: Paulo 70' c Con: McKinley (1/1) 70'

Kingspan Stadium
Attendance: 15,196
Referee: Dan Jones (WRU)

4 March 2017
15:00

(1 BP) Glasgow Warriors (Scotland)	47–17	(Wales) Newport Gwent Dragons
Try: Grigg (2) 28' c, 36' c Hughes 42' c Tagive 49' c Jones 57' c Bennett 66' c Horne 74' c Con: Horne (7/7) 29', 37', 43', 51', 58', 66', 75'	Report	Try: Landman 22' c Morgan 80' c Con: O'Brien (1/1) 23'; D. Jones (1/1) 80'; Pen: O'Brien (1/1) 14'

Scotstoun Stadium
Attendance: 7,096
Referee: Andrew Brace (IRFU)

4 March 2017
17:15

Cardiff Blues (Wales)	13–23	(Ireland) Munster
Try: Summerhill 47' c Con: Shingler (1/1) 48'; Pen: Shingler (2/2) 21', 33'	Report	Try: Saili 51' c Oliver 76' c Con: R. Scannell (2/2) 52', 77'; Pen: R. Scannell (2/3) 25', 66'; Drop: R. Scannell (1/1) 75'

BT Cardiff Arms Park
Attendance: 6,546
Referee: Mike Adamson (SRU)

4 March 2017
19:35

(1 BP) Leinster (Ireland)	45–9	(Wales) Scarlets
Try: L. McGrath (2) 9' c, 20' m Ruddock 47' c Carbery (2) 50' c, 53' m E. Byrne 57' c Gibson-Park 80' c Con: R. Byrne (5/7) 9', 47', 51', 59', 80'	Report	Try: D. Jones (3/3) 3', 15', 28'

RDS Arena
Attendance: 10,792
Referee: Nigel Owens (WRU)

=== Round 9 rescheduled match ===
11 March 2017
18:05

(1 BP) Ulster (Ireland)	68–21	(Italy) Zebre
Try: L. Marshall (2) 6' c, 14' c Pienaar 17' c Piutau (2) 25' c, 46' c Stockdale 30' c Gilroy 43' m Andrew 53' c Olding 68' c P. Marshall 71' c Con: Pienaar (6/7) 7', 15', 18', 26', 31', 45'; Olding (3/3) 54', 69', 72'	Report	Try: De Marchi 12' c Roan 66' c Greeff 75' c Con: Bordoli (1/1) 12'; Palazzani (2/2) 67', 76'

Kingspan Stadium
Attendance: 16,483
Referee: Ian Davies (WRU)

- Game rescheduled from 25 November 2016.

=== Round 18 ===
24 March 2017
19:05

(1 BP) Scarlets (Wales)	26–10	(Scotland) Edinburgh
Try: Patchell (2) 3' m, 31' c W. Jones 20' c J. Davies 24' c Con: Patchell (3/4) 20', 24, 31'	Report	Try: Burleigh 26' c Con: Weir (1/1) 26'; Pen: Weir (1/1) 8'

Parc y Scarlets
Attendance: 6,637
Referee: John Lacey (IRFU)

24 March 2017
19:35

Newport Gwent Dragons (Wales)	17–27	(Ireland) Ulster
Try: Landman 48' c Griffiths 67' c Con: O'Brien (2/2) 48', 67'; Pen: O'Brien (1/1) 13'	Report	Try: Gilroy 8' c Payne 59' c Andrew 79' c Con: Pienaar (2/2) 8', 59'; Jackson 79'; Pen: Pienaar (1/1) 34'; Jackson (1/1) 74'

Rodney Parade
Attendance: 4,877
Referee: Mike Adamson (SRU)

25 March 2017
15:00

Zebre (Italy)	14–50	(Ireland) Munster (1 BP)
Try: Minnie 30' c Greeff 56' c Con: Violi (1/1) 30'; Bordoli (1/1) 56'	Report	Try: N. Scannell 3' c O'Donnell 19' c R. O'Mahony (2) 26' c, 51' m R. Scannell 47' c Cronin (2) 62' c, 71' c Con: Bleyendaal (4/5) 3', 19', 26', 47'; R. Scannell (2/2) 62', 71'; Pen: Bleyendaal (1/1) 40'

Stadio Sergio Lanfranchi
Attendance: 1,240
Referee: Sean Gallagher (IRFU)

25 March 2017
15:00

Leinster (Ireland)	22–21	(Wales) Cardiff Blues (1 BP)
Try: Leavy 4' c L. McGrath 32' c Molony 66' m Con: R. Byrne (2/3) 5', 32'; Pen: R. Byrne (1/1) 54'	Report	Try: T. Williams (2) 11' c, 47' c Bennett 56' c Con: Shingler (3/3) 12', 48', 56'

RDS Arena
Attendance: 10,106
Referee: Marius Mitrea (FIR)

25 March 2017
17:15

(1 BP) Glasgow Warriors (Scotland)	35–24	(Ireland) Connacht
Try: Flynn 11' c Russell 49' c Price 54' c Lamont 77' m Con: Russell (3/3) 12', 50', 54'; Pen: Russell (2/2) 7', 36'; P. Horne (1/1) 74'	Report	Try: Adeolokun 4' m Muldoon 29' c Con: Ronaldson (1/2) 30'; Pen: Ronaldson (3/4) 19', 48', 66'; J. Cooney (1/1) 76'

Scotstoun Stadium
Attendance: 7,351
Referee: Ian Davies (WRU)

25 March 2017
20:35

Benetton Treviso (Italy)	13–5	(Wales) Ospreys
Try: Sgarbi 18' c Con: Tebaldi (1/1) 19'; Pen: Tebaldi (1/2) 57'; McKinley (1/1) 72'	Report	Try: Giles 40' m

Stadio Comunale di Monigo
Attendance: 2,700
Referee: Nigel Owens (WRU)

=== Round 3 rescheduled match ===
1 April 2017
15:30

Zebre (Italy)	25–22	(Ireland) Connacht (1 BP)
Try: Minnie 24' c Boni 41' m Padovani 66' c Con: Canna (2/3) 26', 67'; Pen: Canna (2/3) 7', 31'	Report	Try: Ili 1' m Ronaldson 13' c Rowland 78' c Con: J. Cooney (1/2) 14'; Ronaldson (1/1) 79'; Pen: J. Cooney (1/2) 47'

Stadio Sergio Lanfranchi
Attendance: 2,000
Referee: Mike Adamson (SRU)

- Game rescheduled from 17 September 2016.

=== Round 19 ===
7 April 2017
19:35

(1 BP) Edinburgh (Scotland)	19–22	(Ireland) Connacht
Try: Penalty try 63' c Watson 66' c G. Bryce 73' m Con: Weir (2/3) 63', 67'	Report	Try: E. McKeon 29' c Con: Crosbie (1/1) 30'; Pen: Crosbie (5/5) 8', 26', 36', 49', 60'

New Myreside
Attendance: 3,189
Referee: Dan Jones (WRU)

7 April 2017
19:35

Ulster (Ireland)	24–24	(Wales) Cardiff Blues
Try: Jackson 10' c Penalty try 27' c L. Marshall 68' c Con: Jackson (3/3) 11', 27', 69'; Pen: Jackson (1/1) 56'	Report	Try: Warburton 22' c Lee-Lo (2) 46' c, 59' c Con: Anscombe (3/3) 23', 47', 60'; Pen: Anscombe (1/1) 8'

Kingspan Stadium
Attendance: 15,752
Referee: Ian Davies (WRU)

8 April 2017
14:30

(1 BP) Zebre (Italy)	29–14	(Wales) Newport Gwent Dragons
Try: Ruzza 13' m Minnie 29' c Padovani 49' c Meyer 51' c Con: Canna (3/4) 30', 50', 52'; Pen: Canna (1/2) 4'	Report	Try: Hill 6' c Hughes 44' c Con: O'Brien (2/2) 7', 45'

Stadio Sergio Lanfranchi
Attendance: 2,000
Referee: Frank Murphy (IRFU)

8 April 2017
15:00

(1 BP) Ospreys (Wales)	18–20	(Ireland) Leinster
Try: Davies 4' m Tipuric 61' c Con: Davies (1/1) 61'; Pen: Biggar (2/4) 8', 39'	Report	Try: Cronin 23' c Leavy 46' c Con: Nacewa (2/2) 24', 47'; Pen: Nacewa (1/2) 34'; Drop: R. Byrne (1/1) 79'

Liberty Stadium
Attendance: 8,102
Referee: John Lacey (IRFU)

8 April 2017
19:35

(1 BP) Scarlets (Wales)	51–5	(Italy) Benetton Treviso
Try: Van der Merwe (3) 5' m, 15' c, 66' c S. Evans (2) 8' m, 34' m Owens 24' m Price 42' c A. Davies 68' c Con: D. Jones (2/6) 16', 43'; A. Thomas (2/2) 67', 69'; Pen: D. Jones (1/1) 2'	Report	Try: Gega 48' m

Parc y Scarlets
Attendance: 6,080
Referee: Andrew Brace (IRFU)

8 April 2017
19:35

Munster (Ireland)	10–7	(Scotland) Glasgow Warriors (1 BP)
Try: Cronin 4' c Con: Bleyendaal (1/1) 5'; Pen: R. Scannell (1/1) 60'	Report	Try: Hogg 68' c Con: Russell (1/1) 69'

Irish Independent Park
Attendance: 8,008
Referee: Nigel Owens (WRU)

=== Round 20 ===
14 April 2017
19:35

(1 BP) Glasgow Warriors (Scotland)	45–10	(Italy) Zebre
Try: Grigg 10' c Murchie 18' c Harley 26' c Fagerson 29' c Johnson 59' c Smith (2) 62' m, 74' m Con: P. Horne (5/5) 11', 19', 27', 30', 60'	Report	Try: Van Zyl 66' m Baker 78' m

Scotstoun Stadium
Attendance: 7,321
Referee: David Wilkinson (IRFU)

15 April 2017
15:00

Munster (Ireland)	22–20	(Ireland) Ulster (1 BP)
Try: Lloyd 6' c Earls 61' m O'Callaghan 69' c Con: Keatley (1/1) 7'; Bleyendaal (1/2) 71'; Pen: Keatley (1/1) 36'	Report	Try: Best 3' c L. Marshall 64' c Con: Jackson (2/2) 4', 65'; Pen: Jackson (2/3) 13', 52'

Thomond Park
Attendance: 20,047
Referee: Marius Mitrea (FIR)

15 April 2017
19:35

Connacht (Ireland)	24–37	(Ireland) Leinster (1 BP)
Try: Poolman 18' c Heffernan 49' m Con: Ronaldson (1/2) 18'; Pen: Ronaldson (4/4) 1', 12', 28', 40'	Report	Try: Kirchner 6' m A. Byrne 10' c O'Loughlin 34' m Ruddock 52' c B. Daly 68'c Con: R. Byrne (3/5) 10', 53', 68'; Pen: R. Byrne (2/2) 20', 76'

The Sportsground
Attendance: 8,090
Referee: Ian Davies (WRU)

15 April 2017
20:05

Benetton Treviso (Italy)	21–6	(Scotland) Edinburgh
Try: Barbieri 35' c Esposito 60' m Con: McKinley (1/2) 37'; Pen: McKinley (3/3) 26', 31', 41'	Report	Pen: Tovey (2/2) 24', 57'

Stadio Comunale di Monigo
Attendance: 2,480
Referee: Frank Murphy (IRFU)

==== Judgement Day ====
15 April 2017
14:45

(1 BP) Cardiff Blues (Wales)	35–17	(Wales) Ospreys
Try: Dacey 5' c L. Williams 19' c N. Williams 26' c Anscombe 46' c Con: Anscombe (5/5) 6', 20', 27', 45', 47'	Report	Try: Evans 61' c James 67' c Con: S. Davies (2/2) 61', 67'; Pen: S. Davies (1/1) 17'

Principality Stadium
Attendance: 60,642
Referee: Andrew Brace (IRFU)

15 April 2017
17:15

(1 BP) Newport Gwent Dragons (Wales)	16–21	(Wales) Scarlets
Try: Hughes 79' c Con: O'Brien (1/1) 80'; Pen: O'Brien (3/3) 12', 13', 64'	Report	Try: J. Davies 59' c L. Williams 71' m Con: L. Williams (1/2) 61'; Pen: D. Jones (2/2) 26', 50'; L. Williams (1/1) 67'

Principality Stadium
Attendance: 60,642
Referee: Nigel Owens (WRU)

=== Round 21 ===
28 April 2017
19:05

Cardiff Blues (Wales)	30–24	(Italy) Zebre (1 BP)
Try: Anscombe 22' c Summerhill 24' c T. Williams 58' c Con: Anscombe (3/3) 23', 25', 59'; Pen: Anscombe (3/3) 12', 17', 31'		Try: Penalty try 56' c Mbanda 61' c Van Schalkwyk 79' c Con: Canna (2/2) 57', 62'; Palazzani (1/1) 80'; Pen: Canna (1/1) 27'

BT Cardiff Arms Park
Attendance: 4,737
Referee: Frank Murphy (IRFU)

28 April 2017
19:35

Edinburgh (Scotland)	24–20	(Wales) Newport Gwent Dragons (1 BP)
Try: Kinghorn 73' c Hoyland 78' c Gilchrist 80'+2 c Con: Tovey (3/3) 74', 79', 80'+3; Pen: Tovey (1/1) 9'		Try: Howard 31' c Meyer 48' c Con: O'Brien (2/2) 32', 50'; Pen: O'Brien (2/2) 40', 70'

New Myreside
Attendance: 3,201
Referee: Dan Jones (WRU)

28 April 2017
19:35

(1 BP) Leinster (Ireland)	31–30	(Scotland) Glasgow Warriors (1 BP)
Try: Ryan 5' c O'Loughlin 9' m Dooley 35' m Kirchner 59' m Con: R. Byrne (1/4) 6'; Pen: R. Byrne (2/2) 31', 41'+1; Carbery (1/1) 75'		Try: Ashe 46' c Jones 65' c Russell 70'c Con: Horne (1/1) 47'; Russell (2/2) 66', 71'; Pen: Horne (3/3) 3', 26', 57'

RDS Arena
Attendance: 12,975
Referee: Marius Mitrea (FIR)

29 April 2017
15:00

Ospreys (Wales)	24–10	(Ireland) Ulster
Try: Habberfield 8' c Ardron 40' c Leonard 79' c Con: Biggar (3/3) 9', 41', 79'; Pen: Biggar (1/1) 25'		Try: Stockdale 80' c Con: Jackson (1/1) 80'; Pen: Jackson (1/1) 19'

Liberty Stadium
Attendance: 8,168
Referee: John Lacey (IRFU)

29 April 2017
19:05

Benetton Treviso (Italy)	14–34	(Ireland) Munster (1 BP)
Try: Odiete 49' c Montauriol 80'+1; Con: McKinley (1/1) 50'; Tebaldi (1/1) 80'+1		Try: Sweetnam (2) 25' m, 70' c Zebo 32' c Wootton 64' m O'Donoghue 67' c Con: Bleyendaal (3/5) 33', 68', 71; Pen: Bleyendaal (1/1) 41'

Stadio Comunale di Monigo
Attendance: 1,650
Referee: Ian Davies (WRU)

29 April 2017
20:00

Connacht (Ireland)	8–30	(Wales) Scarlets (1 BP)
Try: Ronaldson 58' m Pen: Boshoff (1/1) 11'		Try: McNicholl 4' c S. Evans (2) 14' m, 26' m L. Williams 31' m Van der Merwe 78' m Con: Patchell (1/5) 5'; Pen: Patchell (1/1) 66'

The Sportsground
Attendance: 5,290
Referee: Mike Adamson (SRU)

=== Round 22 ===
6 May 2017
17:15

(1 BP) Munster (Ireland)	50–14	(Ireland) Connacht
Try: Earls 8' c O'Donoghue 27' c Conway (2) 33' c, 54' c Cronin 43' c Saili 70' c Oliver 80' m Con: Keatley (6/7) 8', 28', 34', 44', 54', 70'; Pen: Keatley (1/1) 25'		Try: Kelleher 51' c Dawai 64' c Con: Ronaldson (2/2) 52', 65'

Thomond Park
Attendance: 18,567
Referee: David Wilkinson (IRFU)

6 May 2017
17:15

(1 BP) Newport Gwent Dragons (Wales)	24–26	(Wales) Cardiff Blues
Try: Meyer 2' m Beard 80' c Con: O'Brien (1/2) 80'; Pen: O'Brien (2/2) 8', 21'; Meyer (2/2) 67', 73'		Try: Morgan 17' c Halaholo 30' c Con: Anscombe (2/2) 18', 31'; Pen: Anscombe (4/4) 52', 65', 76', 79'

Virginia Park
Attendance: 5,167
Referee: Ben Whitehouse (WRU)

6 May 2017
17:15

(1 BP) Scarlets (Wales)	40–17	(Wales) Ospreys
Try: Boyde 35' c S. Evans 38' c Shingler 60' c McNicholl 72' m J. Davies 75' m Con: Patchell (3/5) 37', 40', 61'; Pen: Patchell (3/3) 7', 18' 24'		Try: Giles 11' c Baker 79' c Con: Biggar (1/1) 13'; Evans (1/1) 80'; Pen: Biggar (1/1) 2'

Parc y Scarlets
Attendance: 13,256
Referee: Nigel Owens (WRU)

6 May 2017
17:15

Ulster (Ireland)	17–13	(Ireland) Leinster (1 BP)
Try: Wilson 9' c Trimble 55' c Con: Jackson (2/2) 10', 56'; Pen: Jackson (1/1) 41'		Try: Penalty try 62' c Con: Carbery (1/1) 62'; Pen: Carbery (2/2) 4', 23'

Kingspan Stadium
Attendance: 17,676
Referee: Andrew Brace (IRFU)

6 May 2017
18:15

Zebre (Italy)	3–19	(Italy) Benetton Treviso
Pen: Canna (1/3) 17'		Try: Fuser 10' c Con: McKinley (1/1) 11'; Pen: McKinley (4/4) 35', 43', 50', 54'

Stadio Sergio Lanfranchi
Attendance: 4,500
Referee: Marius Mitrea (FIR)

==== 1872 Cup 2nd round ====
6 May 2017
17:15

Glasgow Warriors (Scotland)	18–29	(Scotland) Edinburgh
Try: Gray 40' m Hogg 65' c Con: Russell (1/2) 65'; Pen: Russell (2/2) 2', 18'		Try: Hoyland 56' c Bryce 80' c Con: Weir (2/2) 58', 80'+1; Pen: Weir (5/5) 7', 14', 33', 43', 53'

Scotstoun Stadium
Attendance: 7,351
Referee: Mike Adamson (SRU)

== Play-offs ==
=== Semi-finals ===
The top four teams at the end of the league rounds meet in the semi-finals in a 1st v 4th and 2nd v 3rd format with the 1st and 2nd teams playing at home.

19 May 2017
19:45

Leinster (Ireland)	15–27	(Wales) Scarlets
Try: Ringrose 23' c Conan 63' m Con: Nacewa (1/2) 24'; Pen: Nacewa (1/1) 19'	Report	Try: S. Evans 8' c Shingler 25' c G. Davies 29' c Con: Patchell (3/3) 9', 25', 30'; Pen: L. Williams (2/2) 69', 79'

RDS Arena
Attendance: 15,861
Referee: Marius Mitrea (FIR)

20 May 2017
18:15

Munster (Ireland)	23–3	(Wales) Ospreys
Try: Saili 26' m Zebo 61' c Conway 75' m Con: Bleyendaal (1/3) 62'; Pen: Bleyendaal (2/2) 67', 41'+3	Report	Pen: Biggar (1/2) 8'

Thomond Park
Attendance: 18,332
Referee: Luke Pearce (RFU)

=== Final ===
27 May 2017
18:15

Munster (Ireland)	22–46	(Wales) Scarlets
Try: Bleyendaal 40' c Conway 75' m Earls 78' c Con: Bleyendaal (1/1) 41'; Keatley (1/2) 78'; Pen: Bleyendaal (1/1) 7'	Report	Try: L. Williams 9' m S. Evans 20' c G. Davies 27' c Beirne 31' c Van der Merwe 70' c Ja. Davies 80'; Con: Patchell (3/4) 21', 28', 32'; L. Williams (2/2) 72', 80'+1; Pen: Patchell (2/2) 19', 45'

Aviva Stadium
Attendance: 44,558
Referee: Nigel Owens (WRU)

== Attendances ==
=== By club ===
- Includes semi-finals but not final at Aviva Stadium. Updated 21 May 2017.

Club	Home Games	Total	Average	Highest	Lowest	% Capacity
(Italy) Benetton Treviso	11	27,056	2,460	3,500	1,500	37%
(Wales) Cardiff Blues (Note: Cardiff Blues attendance figures include a 'home game' played at the Principality Stadium in Cardiff as part of the Judgement Day double header.)	11	130,414	11,856	60,642	4,300	60%
(Ireland) Connacht	11	67,621	6,147	8,090	4,091	76%
(Scotland) Edinburgh	11	57,389	5,217	21,036	2,750	38%
(Scotland) Glasgow Warriors	11	79,044	7,186	7,351	6,489	98%
(Ireland) Leinster	12	186,951	15,579	40,527	10,792	72%
(Ireland) Munster	12	168,076	14,006	26,200	7,405	76%
(Wales) Newport Gwent Dragons (Note: Newport Gwent Dragons attendance figures include a 'home game' played at the Principality Stadium in Cardiff as part of the Judgement Day double header.)	11	107,085	9,735	60,642	3,841	59%
(Wales) Ospreys	11	99,291	9,026	19,514	6,509	43%
(Wales) Scarlets	11	79,032	7,185	13,256	5,630	48%
(Ireland) Ulster	11	175,575	15,961	17,676	13,663	88%
(Italy) Zebre	11	22,641	2,058	4,500	1,240	41%

== End-of-season awards ==
=== Pro12 Dream Team ===
Pos		Player	Team
FB	15	(Ireland) Tiernan O'Halloran	(Ireland) Connacht
RW	14	(Scotland) Tommy Seymour	(Scotland) Glasgow
OC	13	(South Africa) Jaco Taute	(Ireland) Munster
IC	12	(Ireland) Rory Scannell	(Ireland) Munster
LW	11	(New Zealand) Charles Piutau	(Ireland) Ulster
FH	10	(New Zealand) Tyler Bleyendaal	(Ireland) Munster
SH	9	(South Africa) Ruan Pienaar	(Ireland) Ulster
N8	8	(Ireland) Jack Conan	(Ireland) Leinster
OF	7	(Wales) James Davies	(Wales) Scarlets
BF	6	(Ireland) Dan Leavy	(Ireland) Leinster
RL	5	(Ireland) Billy Holland	(Ireland) Munster
LL	4	(Scotland) Ben Toolis	(Scotland) Edinburgh
TP	3	(Ireland) John Ryan	(Ireland) Munster
HK	2	(Wales) Ken Owens (c)	(Wales) Scarlets
LP	1	(Ireland) Dave Kilcoyne	(Ireland) Munster

=== Award winners ===
Award	Winner
Players' Player of the Season	(New Zealand) Charles Piutau (Ulster)
Young Player of the Season	(Ireland) Joey Carbery (Leinster)
Coach of the Season	(South Africa) Rassie Erasmus (Munster)
Chairman's Award	(Wales) Nigel Owens MBE
Golden Boot	(Wales) Sam Davies (Ospreys)
Top try scorer	(Wales) Steff Evans (Scarlets)
Fair play award	(Ireland) Connacht
Try of the Season	(South Africa) Ruan Pienaar (Ulster vs Glasgow)

== Leading scorers ==
Note: Flags to the left of player names indicate national team as has been defined under World Rugby eligibility rules, or primary nationality for players who have not yet earned international senior caps. Players may hold one or more non-WR nationalities. Correct as of 8 May 2017.

=== Top points scorers ===
Rank	Player	Club	Points
1	(Wales) Angus O'Brien	(Wales) Newport Gwent Dragons	130
2	(Wales) Steven Shingler	(Wales) Cardiff Blues	128
3	(Wales) Rhys Patchell	(Wales) Scarlets	127
4	(New Zealand) Tyler Bleyendaal	(Ireland) Munster	126
5	(Scotland) Duncan Weir	(Scotland) Edinburgh	116

=== Top try scorers ===
Rank	Player	Club	Tries
1	(Wales) Steff Evans	(Wales) Scarlets	11
2	(Ireland) Ronan O'Mahony	(Ireland) Munster	9
=	(Ireland) Jacob Stockdale	(Ireland) Ulster	9
3	(Ireland) Rory O'Loughlin	(Ireland) Leinster	8
=	(Ireland) Joey Carbery	(Ireland) Leinster	8
=	(Scotland) Tommy Seymour	(Scotland) Glasgow Warriors	8

=== Top try assists scorers ===
Rank	Player	Club	Points
1	(New Zealand) Tyler Bleyendaal	(Ireland) Munster	12
2	(Scotland) Henry Pyrgos	(Scotland) Glasgow Warriors	9
=	(South Africa) Ruan Pienaar	(Ireland) Ulster	9
=	(Wales) Sam Davies	(Wales) Ospreys	9
3	(Ireland) Duncan Williams	(Ireland) Munster	8
=	(Ireland) Stuart Olding	(Ireland) Ulster	8
=	(Ireland) Ross Byrne	(Ireland) Leinster	8
=	(Wales) Lloyd Williams	(Wales) Cardiff Blues	8
=	(Scotland) Peter Horne	(Scotland) Glasgow Warriors	8
