= 2017 Pro12 Grand Final =

Rugby union match

- Event: 2016–17 Pro12
Munster	Scarlets
(Ireland)	(Wales)
22	46
- Date: 27 May 2017
- Venue: Aviva Stadium, Dublin
- Man of the Match: Aaron Shingler (Scarlets)
- Referee: Nigel Owens (Wales)
- Attendance: 44,558

The 2017 Pro12 Grand Final was the final match of the 2016–17 Pro12 season. The 2016–17 season was the third with Guinness as the title sponsor and the eighth ever League Grand Final. The final was played at the Aviva Stadium in Dublin. The game was contested by Scarlets and Munster with Scarlets winning 46–22.

== Route to the final ==
=== 2017 Playoffs ===
The semi-finals followed a 1 v 4, 2 v 3 system with the games being played at the home ground of the higher placed teams.

19 May 2017
19:45

Leinster (Ireland)	15–27	(Wales) Scarlets
Try: Ringrose 23' c Conan 63' m Con: Nacewa (1/2) 24'; Pen: Nacewa (1/1) 19'	Report	Try: S. Evans 8' c Shingler 25' c G. Davies 29' c Con: Patchell (3/3) 9', 25', 30'; Pen: L. Williams (2/2) 69', 79'

RDS Arena, Dublin
Attendance: 15,861
Referee: Marius Mitrea (Italy)

20 May 2017
18:15

Munster (Ireland)	23–3	(Wales) Ospreys
Try: Saili 26' m Zebo 61' c Conway 75' m Con: Bleyendaal (1/3) 62'; Pen: Bleyendaal (2/2) 67', 41'+3	Report	Pen: Biggar (1/2) 8'

Thomond Park, Limerick
Attendance: 18,332
Referee: Luke Pearce (England)

== Pre-match ==
The match was shown live on Sky Sports in Ireland and the UK, and on TG4 in Ireland, and on BBC Cymru Wales in Wales. Munster wore navy for the final with the Scarlets in red following a coin toss that took place in advance of the semi-finals. On 23 May it was announced that referee Nigel Owens would take charge of the final. It was the fifth final that he has refereed.

== Match ==
=== Summary ===
Scarlets were dominant in the first half and had a 29–10 lead at the break after scoring four tries. They went on to add another two in the second half with Munster adding two late consolation tries.

=== Details ===
27 May 2017
18:15

Munster (Ireland)	22–46	(Wales) Scarlets
Try: Bleyendaal 40' c Conway 75' m Earls 78' c Con: Bleyendaal (1/1) 41'; Keatley (1/2) 78'; Pen: Bleyendaal (1/1) 7'	Report	Try: L. Williams 9' m S. Evans 20' c G. Davies 27' c Beirne 31' c Van der Merwe 70' c Ja. Davies 80' c Con: Patchell (3/4) 21', 28', 32'; L. Williams (2/2) 72', 80+1'; Pen: Patchell (2/2) 19', 45'

Aviva Stadium, Dublin
Attendance: 44,558
Referee: Nigel Owens (Wales)

Munster	Scarlets

FB	15	(Ireland) Simon Zebo	(substituted off) 60'
RW	14	(Ireland) Andrew Conway
OC	13	(New Zealand) Francis Saili
IC	12	(Ireland) Rory Scannell	(substituted off) 27'
LW	11	(Ireland) Keith Earls
FH	10	(New Zealand) Tyler Bleyendaal
SH	9	(Ireland) Conor Murray	(substituted off) 71'
N8	8	(Ireland) CJ Stander
OF	7	(Ireland) Tommy O'Donnell	(substituted off) 44'
BF	6	(Ireland) Peter O'Mahony (c)
RL	5	(Ireland) Billy Holland	(substituted off) 52'
LL	4	(Ireland) Donnacha Ryan
TP	3	(Ireland) John Ryan	(substituted off) 45'
HK	2	(Ireland) Niall Scannell	(substituted off) 54'
LP	1	(Ireland) Dave Kilcoyne	(substituted off) 67'
Substitutions:
HK	16	(New Zealand) Rhys Marshall	(substituted in) 54'
PR	17	(Ireland) Brian Scott	(substituted in) 67'
PR	18	(Ireland) Stephen Archer	(substituted in) 45'
FL	19	(South Africa) Jean Deysel	(substituted in) 44'
FL	20	(Ireland) Jack O'Donoghue	(substituted in) 52'
SH	21	(Ireland) Duncan Williams	(substituted in) 71'
FH	22	(Ireland) Ian Keatley	(substituted in) 60'
CE	23	(South Africa) Jaco Taute	(substituted in) 27'
Coach:
(South Africa) Rassie Erasmus

FB	15	(New Zealand) Johnny McNicholl
RW	14	(Wales) Liam Williams
OC	13	(Wales) Jonathan Davies
IC	12	(Wales) Scott Williams
LW	11	(Wales) Steff Evans	(substituted off) 57'
FH	10	(Wales) Rhys Patchell	(substituted off) 54'
SH	9	(Wales) Gareth Davies	(substituted off) 51'
N8	8	(Scotland) John Barclay (c)	(substituted off) 61'
OF	7	(Wales) James Davies
BF	6	(Wales) Aaron Shingler
RL	5	(Ireland) Tadhg Beirne
LL	4	(Wales) Lewis Rawlins	(substituted off) 61'
TP	3	(Wales) Samson Lee	(substituted off) 27'
HK	2	(Wales) Ryan Elias	(substituted off) 71'
LP	1	(Wales) Rob Evans	(substituted off) 51'
Substitutions:
HK	16	(Wales) Emyr Phillips	(substituted in) 71'
PR	17	(Wales) Wyn Jones	(substituted in) 51'
PR	18	(South Africa) Werner Kruger	(substituted in) 27'
LK	19	(South Africa) David Bulbring	(substituted in) 61'
FL	20	(Wales) Will Boyde	(substituted in) 61'
SH	21	(Wales) Jonathan Evans	(substituted in) 51'
CE	22	(New Zealand) Hadleigh Parkes	(substituted in) 54'
WG	23	(Canada) D. T. H. van der Merwe	(substituted in) 57'
Coach:
(New Zealand) Wayne Pivac

Man of the Match:
Aaron Shingler (Scarlets)

Touch judges:
David Wilkinson (Ireland)
Ian Davies (Wales)
Television match official:
Neil Paterson (Scotland)
