= Ian McKinley =

Irish rugby union player

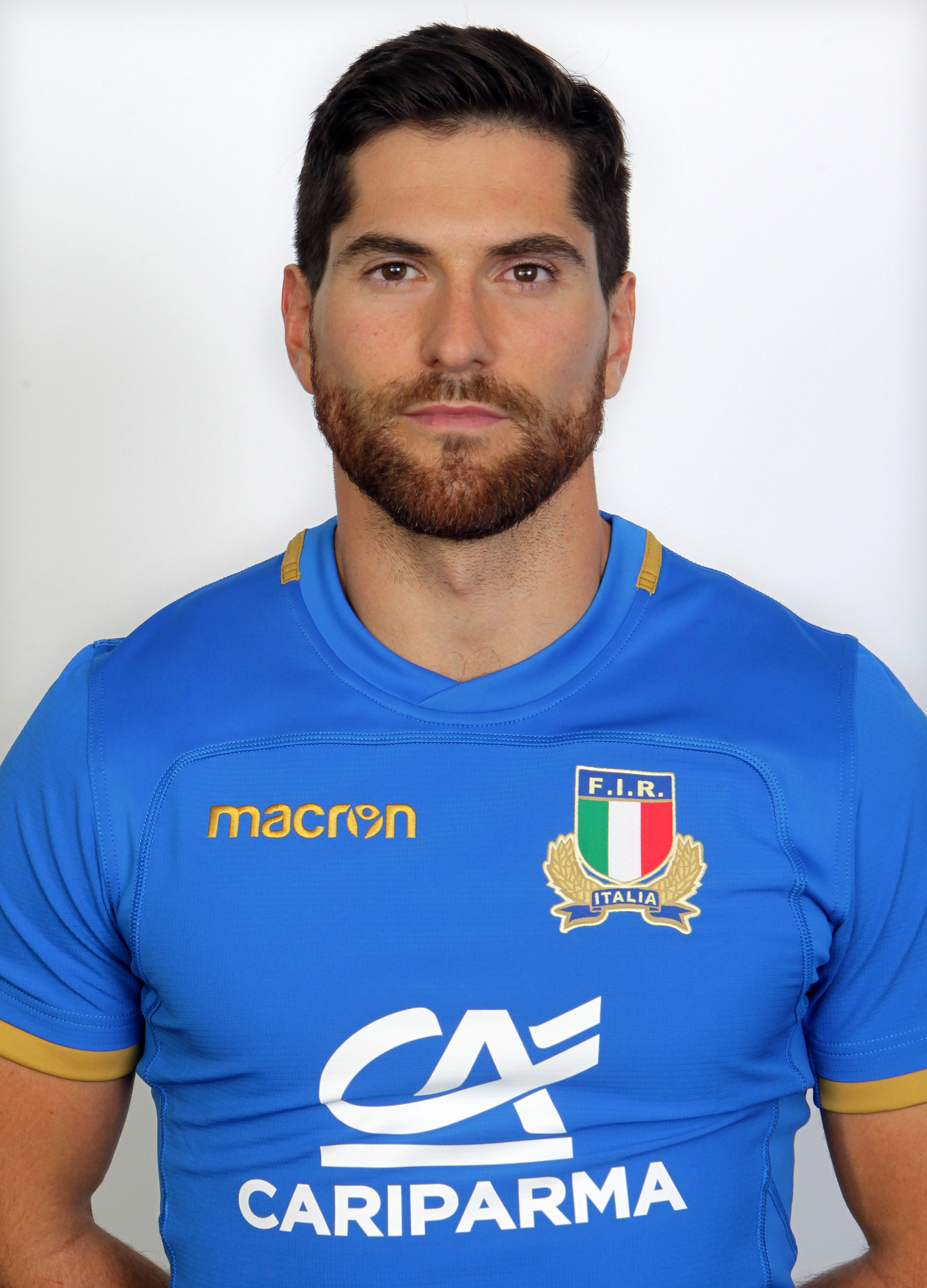
- Born: 4 December 1989 (age 36) Dublin, Ireland
- Height: 1.80 m (5 ft 11 in)
- Weight: 90 kg (14 st; 200 lb)

Rugby union career
- Position: Fly-half
Amateur team(s)
Years	Team	Apps	(Points)
2007−2011	St Mary's		
Senior career
Years	Team	Apps	(Points)
2009–2012	Leinster	6	(8)
2013–2014	Leonorso Udine	-	(-)
2014–2016	Viadana	35	(268)
2015–2016	→Zebre	3	(5)
2016–2020	Benetton	67	(221)
- Correct as of 6 Mar 2020
International career
Years	Team	Apps	(Points)
2009	Ireland U20	9	(49)
2017–2019	Italy	9	(3)
- Correct as of 10 Aug 2019
Coaching career
- Years: Team
- 2012–2014: Leonorso Udine (Coach Junior squad)
- 2020–2024: Rainey Old Boys (assistant coach)
- 2024–: Rangers Vicenza (assistant coach)

Ian McKinley (born 4 December 1989) is a retired Irish-born, Italian rugby union player. He played at fly-half and he represented Italy on 9 occasions. From summer 2024 he is Assistant Coach of Rangers Vicenza.

== Career ==
In 2011, after playing 6 times for Irish province Leinster, McKinley was forced to retire from rugby union after losing the sight in his left eye because of an incident during a rugby game. After his retirement, he moved to Italy to work as a coach for junior sides.

Despite the blindness in one eye, McKinley made a return to rugby in 2014 in Italy using specially manufactured goggles, firstly with Leonorso in a regional third division match, in which McKinley scored 28 points, and then with Viadana on a two-year contract in the National Championship of Excellence, which, in turn, led to him being signed by another Italian side, Zebre as Fly-half cover for the 2015 Rugby World Cup and 2016 Six Nations Championship. Shortly afterwards, McKinley was signed by Treviso ahead of the 2016–17 Pro12 season. He played with Treviso until 2020.

Since McKinley never played a game for Ireland before his first retirement, having spent three years in Italian rugby made him eligible to represent Italy on the international stage. Italy's head coach Conor O'Shea included McKinley in his squad for the 2017 Summer Tests, but decided not to field him in any game. On 11 November 2017, however, Ian McKinley played his first international game for Italy, in an Autumn Internationals test match against Fiji, subbed in after 62 minutes for Carlo Canna. Italy won that game 19–10, with McKinley scoring the last goal kick.
