= Francis Saili =

New Zealand rugby union player

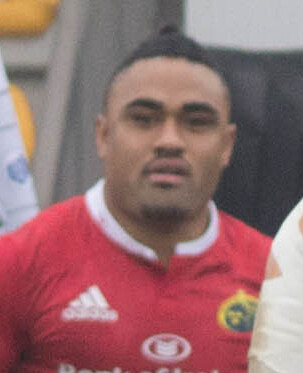
- Born: 16 February 1991 (age 35) Auckland, New Zealand
- Height: 1.80 m (5 ft 11 in)
- Weight: 99 kg (15.6 st; 218 lb)
- School: St Peter's College
- Notable relative: Peter Saili (brother)

Rugby union career
- Position(s): Centre, Wing
Senior career
Years	Team	Apps	(Points)
2011–2014	Auckland	14	(5)
2012–2015	Blues	42	(35)
2012–2013	North Harbour	15	(15)
2015–2017	Munster	40	(45)
2017–2020	Harlequins	34	(10)
2020–2022	Biarritz	48	(50)
2022-2024	Racing 92	44	(25)
2024-	Vannes	8	(15)
- Correct as of 18 September 2021
International career
Years	Team	Apps	(Points)
2011	New Zealand U20	5	(20)
2013	New Zealand	2	(0)
2014	Barbarians	2	(12)
- Correct as of 26 September 2021

Francis Saili (born 16 February 1991) is a New Zealand rugby union player, currently playing for French club Racing 92. He plays primarily as a centre, though he can also play wing. He is the younger brother of Blues loose forward Peter Saili.

== Early life ==
Saili was born in Auckland and educated at St Peter's College where he played rugby in the school First XV. He was the captain in 2009. He represented New Zealand in schoolboy and global under-age tournaments. After leaving school he played for Auckland Marist.

== Career ==
Saili was part of the New Zealand Under 20 team that won the Junior World Championship in Italy in 2011.

Saili started his professional rugby career in 2011, with a start in the ITM Cup for Auckland. In 2012, he commenced playing for the Blues in a match against the Stormers. In 2013, Saili made his debut for the All Blacks against Argentina in Hamilton. On 1 November 2014, he played for the Barbarians against Australia, scoring a try at Twickenham.

On 6 April 2015, it was announced that Saili would be joining Irish provincial side Munster on a two-year contract. He made his debut on 21 August 2015 in Munster's uncapped pre-season friendly loss to Irish rivals Connacht. Saili made his full Munster debut on 13 September 2015, starting against Ospreys in the 2015–16 Pro12. He made his European Rugby Champions Cup debut on 14 November 2015, starting the opening 2015–16 pool game against Treviso. On 16 August 2016, it was announced that Saili would be out for 3–4 months following a surgical procedure on his shoulder.

On 26 December 2016, Saili made his return from the injury, coming on as a replacement for Jaco Taute in Munster's game against Leinster. On 14 January 2017, Saili scored the winning try in Munster's 12–14 away win against Glasgow Warriors, a win that secured Munster's place in the quarter-finals of the 2016–17 European Rugby Champions Cup. On 19 May 2017, it was announced that Saili would leave Munster at the end of the 2016–17 season. The following day, in what was his final appearance for Munster in Thomond Park, Saili scored a try and won the Man-of-the-Match award in the sides 23–3 2016–17 Pro12 semi-final victory against Ospreys. On 27 May 2017, Saili made his final appearance for Munster when he started against Scarlets in the 2017 Pro12 Grand Final in the Aviva Stadium, Dublin.

On 21 June 2017, it was announced that Saili had signed for English Premiership side Harlequins. Saili played in his first senior game after recovering from an injury on 14 October in a European Champions Cup game against French side La Rochelle. He came on as a substitute in a 34–27 loss.

Saili left Harlequins to join French Pro D2 club Biarritz for the 2020–21 season where he played a pivotal role in helping the club secure promotion. Biarritz lost to Perpignan in the 2021 Pro D2 Final, however helped the club to gain promotion to the Top 14 winning against Bayonne. He played another season where Biarritz finished 14th and were relegated to the Pro D2.

Francis then signed on a one-year contract with Racing 92 before the 2022-23 Season where Racing reached the Top 14 Semi finals losing to Toulouse. Francis signed a contract extension keeping him at Racing for another season.
