= Rory O'Loughlin =

Irish rugby union player (born 1994)

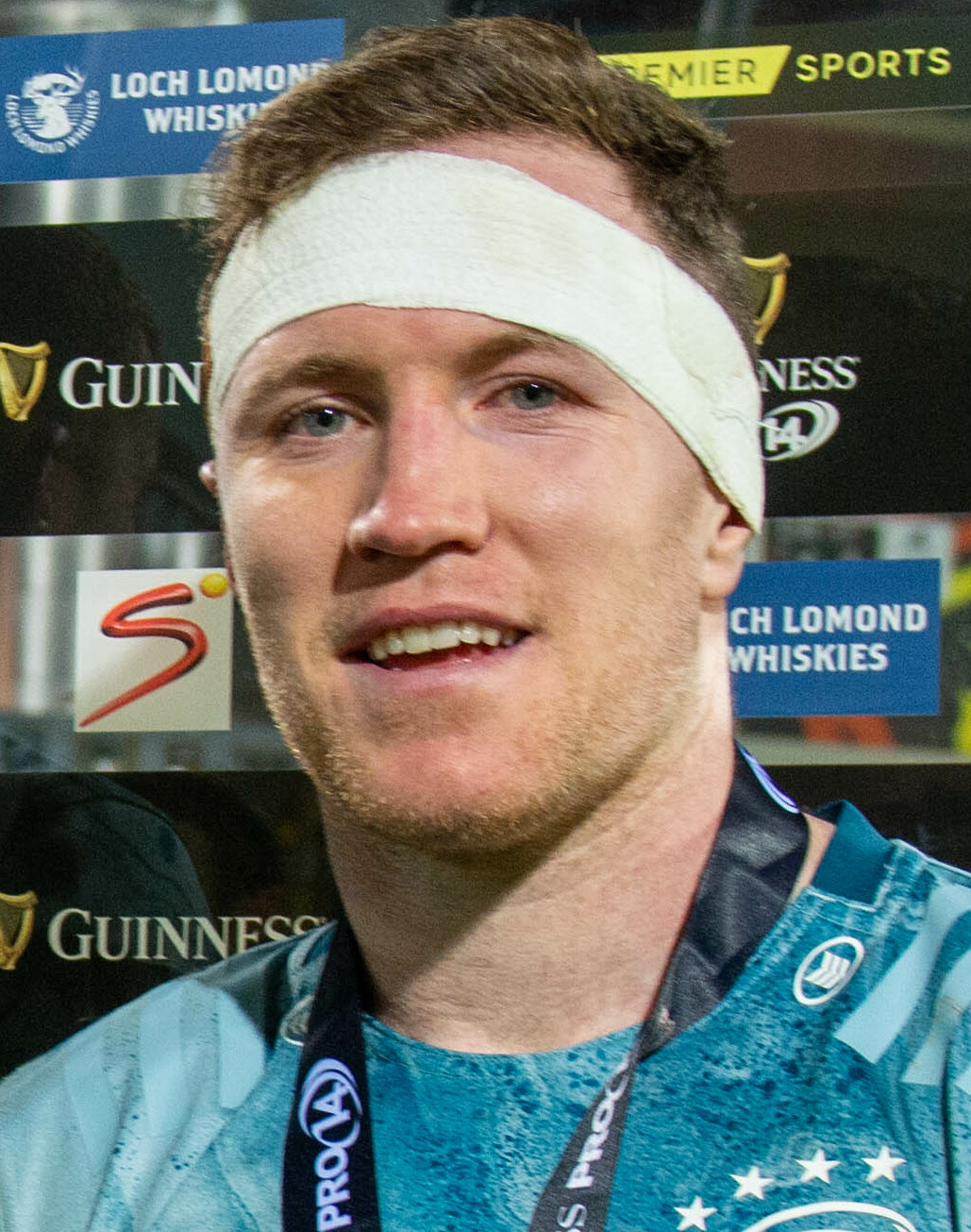
- Born: 21 January 1994 (age 32) Dublin, Ireland
- Height: 1.88 m (6 ft 2 in)
- Weight: 94.09 kg (14.817 st; 207.4 lb)
- School: St Michael's College
- University: University College Dublin

Rugby union career
- Position(s): Wing, Centre
Amateur team(s)
Years	Team	Apps	(Points)
- Old Belvedere
Senior career
Years	Team	Apps	(Points)
2016–2022	Leinster	99	(120)
2022–	Exeter Chiefs	20	(0)
- Correct as of 27 December 2022
International career
Years	Team	Apps	(Points)
2017	Ireland	1	(0)
- Correct as of 17 June 2017

Rory O'Loughlin (born 21 January 1994) is an Irish rugby union player for Exeter Chiefs in England's Premiership Rugby, he previously played for Pro14 side Leinster and represented Old Belvedere in the Ulster Bank All-Ireland League. He plays primarily as a wing, though he can also play at centre.

== Leinster ==
On 2 September 2016, O'Loughlin made his senior competitive debut for Leinster when he came off the bench in the sides opening 2016–17 Pro12 20–8 victory against Treviso in the RDS. On 17 December 2016, O'Loughlin made his European Rugby Champions Cup debut when he was a replacement in Leinster's 60–13 victory against Northampton Saints in Round 3 of the 2016–17 pool stage. On 6 January 2017, O'Loughlin scored a hat-trick against Zebre during Leinster's 70–6 win in the Pro12.

== Exeter ==
In March 2022 O'Loughlin signed with the Exeter Chiefs for the 2022–23 season.

== International ==
O'Loughlin earned his first cap for the Ireland national rugby union team in 2017. He previously played for the Ireland national rugby sevens team.
