= Jonathan Evans (rugby union) =

Welsh rugby union player (born 1992)

- Born: Jonathan Rhys Evans; 25 July 1992 (age 34) Cardiff, Wales
- Height: 1.83 m (6 ft 0 in)
- Weight: 89 kg (196 lb; 14 st 0 lb)
- School: Lewis School, Pengam

Rugby union career
- Position: Scrum half
Amateur team(s)
Years	Team	Apps	(Points)
- Bargoed RFC
Senior career
Years	Team	Apps	(Points)
2010–2012	Bargoed	10	(5)
2010–2011	Newport RFC	13	(15)
2010–2015	Newport Gwent Dragons	83	(55)
2011–2014	Bedwas	7	(0)
2014	Cross Keys	1	(5)
2015–2016	Bath	4	(5)
2016–2020	Scarlets	30	(30)
2016–2020	Llanelli	1	(0)
2021–	Ebbw Vale		
- Correct as of 28 April 2023
International career
Years	Team	Apps	(Points)
2010	Wales U18	2	
2011–2012	Wales U20	18	(5)

Jonathan Evans (born 25 July 1992) is a Welsh rugby union footballer, who play at scrum half for Ebbw Vale RFC. He also played for the Scarlets, Newport Gwent Dragons and Bath.

== Club career ==
Evans played his junior rugby and also began his senior career at Bargoed RFC, he had also been a member of the Newport Gwent Dragons academy. Before playing for the Dragons he had played for Welsh Premier Division sides Pontypool RFC and Newport RFC. Originally an outside half, Evans move to scrum half at U16 level.

Evans made his professional debut for the Newport Gwent Dragons in a Pro12 match against the Ospreys on 7 May 2010, he was at the time the youngest Dragons player ever at 17.

On 24 February 2015, it was announced Evans would join Premiership side Bath from the start of the 2015–16 season. Evans made his first appearance for Bath as a substitute against Newcastle Falcons on 2 January 2016. He scored his first try for Bath in a 16–14 victory over Worcester Warriors. Evans struggled to get game time, and found himself down the pecking order below Chris Cook and Nikola Matawalu. Evans left Bath after making four appearances in his only season at the club.

On 22 February 2016, it was announced Evans would join Welsh region Scarlets at the start of the 2016–17 season. He was part of the team that won the 2016–17 Pro12 title, coming off the bench in the Grand Final as the Scarlets beat Munster 46–22.

Evans was released at the end of the 2019–20 season. Evans found a career in teacher recruitment after his release, but in November 2021 joined Ebbw Vale RFC, marking a return to competitive rugby.

== International career ==
Evans made two appearances for Wales U18 in 2010, and represented Wales U20 in 2011 and 2012 a two U20 Six Nations and Junior World Championships.
