= Peter Saili =

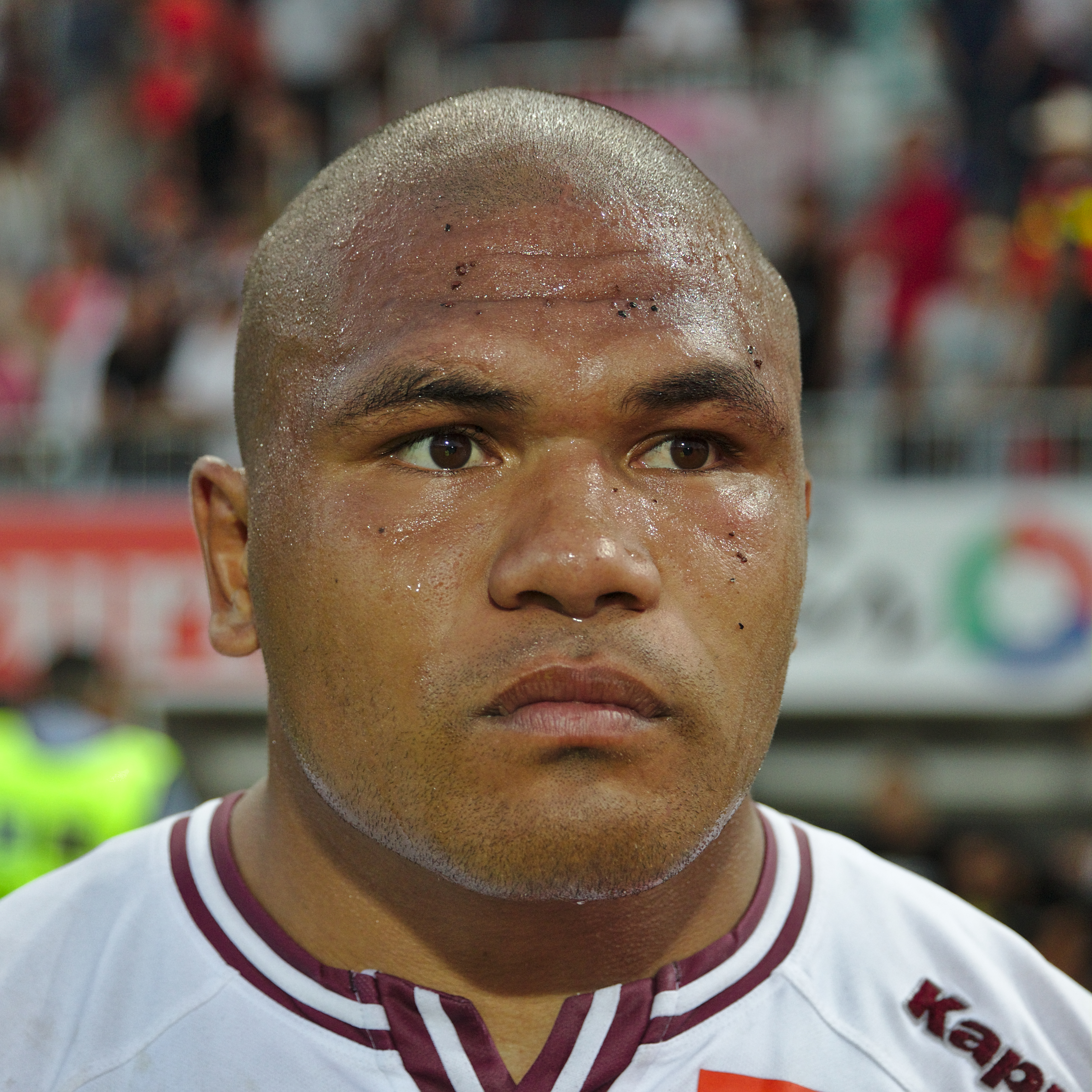
- Born: Peter Saili; 4 January 1988 (age 38) Auckland, New Zealand
- Height: 1.90 m (6 ft 3 in)
- Weight: 114 kg (251 lb)
- School: St Peter's College, Auckland
- Notable relative: Francis Saili (brother)

Rugby union career
- Position: Loose forward
- Current team: Valence Romans
Senior career
| Years | Team | Apps | (Points) |
| 2015-2017 | Bordeaux | 26 | (10) |
| 2017−2019 | Pau | 12 | (15) |
| 2019− | Valence Romans | 31 | (10) |
Provincial / State sides
| Years | Team | Apps | (Points) |
| 2008–2015 | Auckland | 70 | (20) |
- Correct as of 19 October 2014
Super Rugby
| Years | Team | Apps | (Points) |
| 2009–2015 | Blues | 71 | (20) |
- Correct as of 13 July 2014

Peter Saili (born 4 January 1988) is a New Zealand rugby player, who plays at the Blindside Flanker/ No 8 position for the Bordeaux.

== Early life ==
Saili was born in Auckland and educated at St Peter's College where he played rugby in the school First XV. He represented New Zealand in schoolboy and global under-age tournaments. After leaving school he played for Auckland Marist. He is the older brother of Blues and All Black centre Francis Saili.

== Career ==
Saili was a junior All Black in 2007 and 2008. In 2007 he was a member of the team which won the International Rugby Board's junior world championship (Under 19), defeating South Africa in the final (31-7). In 2008 he was a member of the New Zealand team which won the International Rugby Board's junior world championship (the inaugural under-20 tournament), pulling off a crushing 38–3 win (four tries to none) over England in Swansea, Wales.

Saili started his professional rugby career in 2008, with a start in the NPC for Auckland against Poverty Bay. In 2009 he commenced playing for the Blues in a match against the Western Force.

On 16 January 2015, it was revealed that The Blues had released Saili with immediate effect to allow him to take up a contract in France
