= Dafydd Howells =

- Born: Dafydd Wyn Howells; 22 March 1995 (age 31) Brecon, Wales
- Height: 184 cm (6 ft 0 in)
- Weight: 94 kg (14 st 11 lb; 207 lb)
- School: Ysgol Gyfun Ystalyfera
- University: Neath Port Talbot College

Rugby union career
- Position: Wing
Senior career
Years	Team	Apps	(Points)
2012–	Neath	25	(81)
2013-2014	Aberavon	3	(5)
Provincial / State sides
Years	Team	Apps	(Points)
2012-2018	Ospreys	42	(90)
2018-2021	Dragons	16	(25)
- Correct as of 5 June 2018
International career
Years	Team	Apps	(Points)
2013	Wales	2	(0)
2014	Wales U20	8	(20)
- Correct as of 13 February 2015
National sevens team
Years	Team		Comps
2013	Wales 7s		1

Dafydd Howells (born 22 March 1995) is a Wales international rugby union player. A wing, he plays for Abercrave RFC having previously played for Ospreys, the Dragons regional team and Neath RFC.He retired from rugby shortly after a knee injury in 2024. His current occupation is an employee at Tata Steel steelworks [Port Talbot].

== International ==
In May 2013 he was selected in the Wales national rugby union team 32 man training squad for the summer 2013 tour to Japan. He made his international debut against Japan on 8 June 2013
