= Jaco Taute =

South African rugby union player

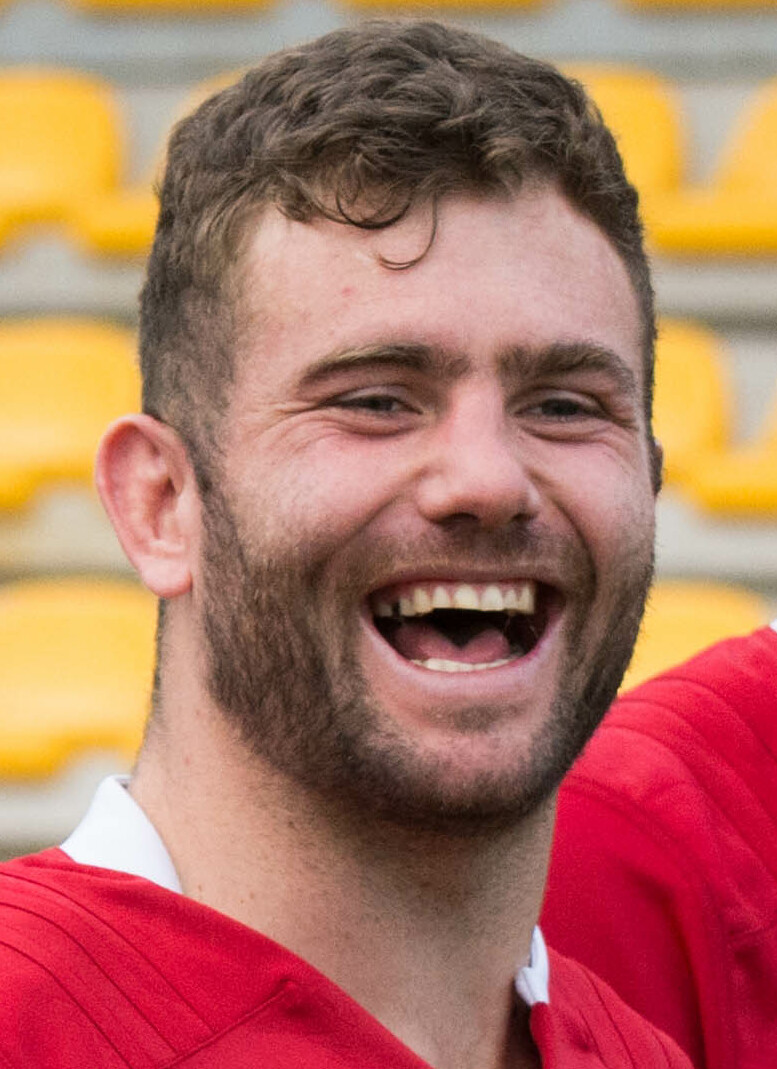
- Taute at the Guinness Pro12 2016–17
- Full name: Jacob Johannes Taute
- Born: 21 March 1991 (age 35) Springs, South Africa
- Height: 1.91 m (6 ft 3 in)
- Weight: 108 kg (17.0 st; 238 lb)
- School: Monument High School
- University: University of Johannesburg

Rugby union career
- Position(s): Centre, Fullback
Youth career
- 2007: Falcons
- 2008–2009: Golden Lions
Amateur team(s)
Years	Team	Apps	(Points)
2010	UJ	2	(0)
Senior career
Years	Team	Apps	(Points)
2009–2012	Golden Lions	31	(68)
2010	Golden Lions XV	3	(4)
2010–2012	Lions	31	(51)
2013–2016	Stormers	23	(8)
2014–2016	Western Province	23	(35)
2016–2019	Munster	40	(40)
2019–2022	Leicester Tigers	19	(0)
- Correct as of 2 July 2022
International career
Years	Team	Apps	(Points)
2010–2011	South Africa U20	7	(20)
2012	South Africa	3	(0)
- Correct as of 14 April 2013

Jacob Johannes Taute (born 21 March 1991) is a South African retired rugby union player. He played as a fullback or centre, he won three caps for South Africa. Taute played for the Stormers and the Lions in Super Rugby, the Golden Lions and Western Province in the Currie Cup, Munster in the Pro14 and Leicester Tigers in Premiership Rugby.

== Career ==
=== South Africa ===
He was a member of the South Africa Under 20 team that competed in the 2010 and 2011 IRB Junior World Championships. During the 2012 Rugby Championship, Taute made his international debut for the Springboks against the Wallabies at Loftus Versfeld. He was a late inclusion into the squad and played at centre after François Steyn was ruled out with injury.

=== Munster ===
In September 2016, he joined Irish Pro14 side Munster on a four-month contract as a replacement for the injured Francis Saili. On 1 October 2016, Taute made his competitive debut for Munster in the 2016–17 Pro12 fixture against Zebre. On 22 October 2016, Taute scored a try in Munster's 38–17 win against Glasgow Warriors in Round 2 of the 2016–17 European Rugby Champions Cup, a match that was his European debut for the province. On 10 December 2016, Taute scored two tries in Munster's 38–0 win against Leicester Tigers.

On 2 January 2017, it was confirmed that Taute's contract with Munster had been extended until June 2017. On 4 March 2017, Taute won the Man-of-the-Match award in Munster's 23–13 away win against Cardiff Blues in Cardiff Arms Park. On 5 May 2017, Taute was named in the 2016–17 Pro12 Dream Team. On 19 May 2017, it was announced that Taute had signed a two-year contract with Munster which will see him remain with the province until June 2019.

Taute suffered a knee ligament injury in Munster's 2017–18 Pro14 fixture against Cardiff Blues on 30 September 2017, ruling him out for six months. He made his return from the injury in Munster's 2018–19 Pro14 fixture against Glasgow Warriors on 7 September 2018, coming on as a replacement for Rory Scannell in the 63rd minute of the match. Taute captained Munster for the first time in their fixture against Ulster on 21 December 2018.

=== Leicester Tigers ===
Ahead of the 2019–20 season, Taute joined Premiership Rugby side Leicester Tigers. He made his Leicester debut in a European Challenge Cup match as a substitute against Pau on 16 November 2019, with his first start coming two weeks later against Northampton Saints in a Premiership Rugby match. He extended his contract on 8 July 2020, and captained the club twice in the 2020-21 season.

Taute injured his knee in February 2021 and missed over a year of matches, in his comeback match he lasted only 9 minutes before re-injuring his knee.

On 1 July 2022 Taute announced his retirement from professional rugby.
