= Guglielmo Palazzani =

Italy international rugby union player

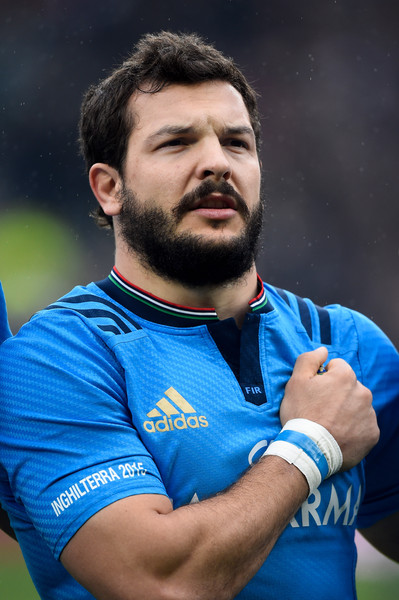
- Palazzani at the RBS 6 Nations 2015 for Italy vs England
- Born: 11 April 1991 (age 35) Gardone Val Trompia, Italy
- Height: 1.77 m (5 ft 10 in)
- Weight: 80 kg (12 st 8 lb; 176 lb)

Rugby union career
- Position: Scrum-Half
- Current team: Colorno
Youth career
- 2006−2010: Fiumicello
Senior career
| Years | Team | Apps | (Points) |
| 2010-2013 | Calvisano | 60 | (82) |
| 2013 | →Zebre | 2 | (0) |
| 2013−2022 | Zebre | 159 | (102) |
| 2022−2023 | Calvisano | 18 | (62) |
| 2023−2025 | Colorno | 39 | |
- Correct as of 9 Apr 2022
International career
| Years | Team | Apps | (Points) |
| 2012−2013 | Emerging Italy | 6 | (0) |
| 2014−2022 | Italy | 44 | (15) |
- Correct as of 27 Feb 2021

Guglielmo Palazzani (Italian pronunciation: [ɡuʎˈʎɛlmo palatˈtsaːni]; born 11 April 1991) was an Italian rugby union player. His usual position is as a scrum-half, and he played for Colorno in Italian Serie A Elite.

== Early life and amateur career ==
Palazzani began playing rugby in the youth teams of Fiumicello di Brescia, before moving on to Calvisano in 2009. He went on to make his debut in the A2 series in April 2010 in Benevento against the Samnite Gladiators; at the same time, climbing up the ranks of the Italian youth national teams up to the Under-20 in 2011, during which he competed with the squad in the Six Nations championships.

== Professional career ==
In 2012, Palazzani won the National Championship with Cavisano and the Excellence Trophy. For 2012–13 Pro12 season, he named as Permit Player for Zebre in Pro 14. Palazzani made his professional domestic debut for the Zebre in 2013, and at the end of the season he moved to the Parma rugby team on a permanent basis. He played for Zebre until 2021–22 United Rugby Championship season. For 2022−23 season he come back to plays for Calvisano in Top10.

== International career ==
In 2012 and 2013, he was named in the Emerging Italy squad. In the wake of these successes, he was called up to the squad, for the Nations Cup tournament. In 2014 the then head coach of the Italian national team, Jacques Brunel, called him up for the 2014 Six Nations Championship, however, he did not play in that years tournament. Palazzani would go on to make his test debut during the mid-year tour in the Pacific against Fiji. Brunel, rewarded Palazzani for his form by selecting him as part of the Italian team that took part in the 2015 Rugby World Cup in England, and he became a mainstay in the squad competing in successive Six Nations, on international tours. Regarding Rugby World Cup, on 24 August 2015, Palazzani was named in the final 31-man squad for the 2015 Rugby World Cup and on 18 August 2019, he was named in the final 31-man squad for the 2019 Rugby World Cup.
