= Sam Hobbs (rugby union) =

Welsh rugby union player

- Born: Sam Hobbs; 13 May 1988 (age 38) Brecon, Wales
- Height: 193 cm (6 ft 4 in)
- Weight: 121 kg (19 st 1 lb)

Rugby union career
- Position: Prop
Senior career
Years	Team	Apps	(Points)
2010–2016	Cardiff Blues	126	(45)
2016–2018	Dragons	42	(15)
- Correct as of 28 May 2018
International career
Years	Team	Apps	(Points)
- Wales U20

Sam Hobbs (born 13 May 1988, Brecon) is a Welsh rugby union player. A prop forward, he made his full professional debut for the Cardiff Blues regional team on 9 January 2010 having previously played for Pontypridd RFC.

After six years at the Blues, during which time he made a total of 126 appearances, he was released at the end of the 2015–16 season to sign for the Blues' regional rivals the Dragons. Hobbs played for the Dragons for two seasons, before being released at the end of the 2017–18 season after making 36 appearances.

Hobbs is a former Wales Under-19 and Under-20 international. In May 2013 he was selected in the Wales national rugby union team 32-man training squad for the summer 2013 tour to Japan; however, he was not capped on the tour.

He was released by the Dragons regional team at the end of the 2017–18 season.

== Personal life ==
Sam married Elin in 2014. They have a daughter and a son together.
