= Sion Bennett =

Welsh rugby player (born 1993)

- Born: Sion Bennett; 27 November 1993 (age 32)
- Height: 193 cm (6 ft 4 in)
- Weight: 101 kg (15 st 13 lb)

Rugby union career
- Position: Backrow
- Current team: Valley RFC
Senior career
Years	Team	Apps	(Points)
2011-2015	Carmarthen Quins	42	(25)
2013-2015	Scarlets	2	(0)
2015-2019	Cardiff Rugby	18	(15)
2020-	Valley RFC	28	(15)
- Correct as of 29 November 2023
International career
Years	Team	Apps	(Points)
2013	Wales U20	8	(10)
- Correct as of 29 November 2023

Sion Bennett (born 27 November 1993) is a Welsh rugby union player for Valley RFC in Hong Kong. He moved to Cardiff in January 2017 initially on loan, and then on a permanent basis from April 2017 having previously played at Northampton Saints in the Aviva Premiership.

He previously played for semi-pros Carmarthen Quins, making his debut for them in 2011. He then made his Scarlets debut in a friendly against London Welsh in 2013.

In the summer of 2015, Bennett moved to Northampton Saints. He originally signed a one-year contract, which was extended in March 2016.

He is also a previous Wales U20 international, making 8 appearances for them in 2013.

In 2020 he joined Hong Kong Premiership side Valley RFC.
