= Liam Williams (rugby union) =

Wales and British Lions international rugby union player

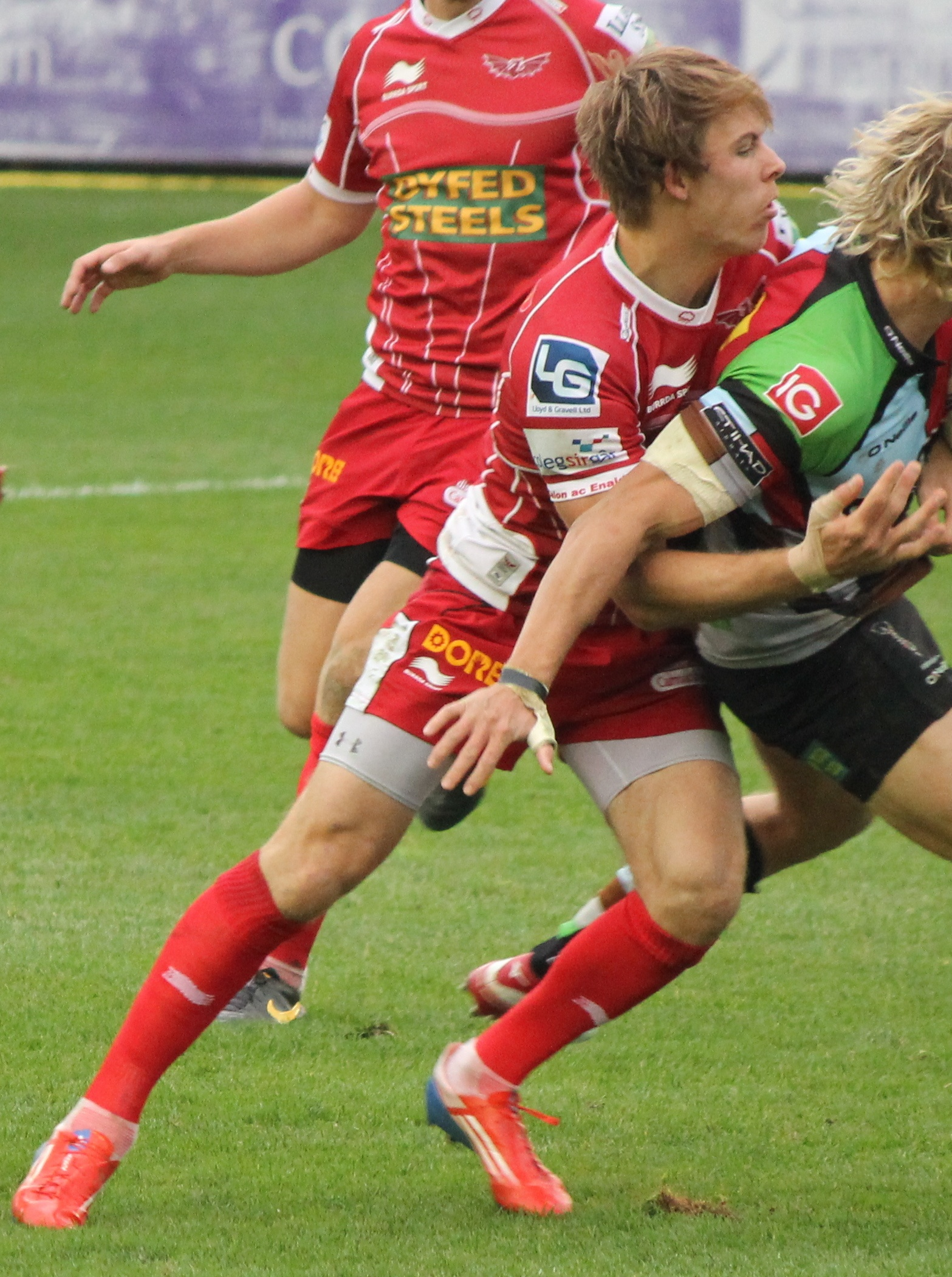
- Williams representing Scarlets during the 2013–14 Heineken Cup
- Born: Liam Brian Williams; 9 April 1991 (age 35) Swansea, Wales
- Height: 188 cm (6 ft 2 in)
- Weight: 85 kg (187 lb; 13 st 5 lb)

Rugby union career
- Position(s): Full-back, Wing
- Current team: Newcastle Red Bulls
Youth career
- Waunarlwydd RFC
Senior career
Years	Team	Apps	(Points)
2010–2017	Scarlets	118	(190)
2017–2019	Saracens	30	(105)
2019–2022	Scarlets	9	(0)
2022–2023	Cardiff Rugby	4	(0)
2023–2024	Kubota Spears	6	(21)
2024–2025	Saracens	5	(5)
2025–2026	Newcastle Red Bulls	3	(0)
- Correct as of 10 March 2026
International career
Years	Team	Apps	(Points)
2011	Wales U20s	8	(15)
2012–2025	Wales	93	(105)
2017, 2021	British & Irish Lions	5	(0)
- Correct as of 25 March 2026

Liam Brian Williams (born 9 April 1991) is a former Welsh professional rugby union player who played for Newcastle Red Bulls in Premiership Rugby. At international level, he has represented Wales, having made his test debut against New Zealand in 2012, and the British & Irish Lions in 2017 and 2021. Williams has previously played for Scarlets, Cardiff and Kubota Spears.

== Club career ==
A school boy developed by the local Waunarlwydd RFC club, he was not picked up by any of the Welsh regional professional academies, and hence aged 16 started working as a trainee scaffolder at Port Talbot Steelworks, whilst continuing to play for Waunarlwydd.

Aged 20 Williams was signed by Scarlets, being developed for his first year in 2010–11 at Llanelli RFC, making his debut against Carmarthen Quins in March 2010. Williams then went on to make his Scarlets regional debut against Connacht on 10 September 2011 and scoring his first try in the away defeat to Benetton Treviso on 1 October 2011. Williams had a dream first season at the Scarlets, going on to score 40 points in 26 appearances. His performances led him to be nominated for the LV Breakthrough Player Award and he was voted Player's Player of the Year for the Scarlets.

Following a string of superb performances for both Scarlets and Wales during 2014, Williams was named Wales Player of the Year.

Williams played an integral role in the Scarlets run to the 2017 Pro12 Grand Final, their first championship win since 2004. This included crossing for the opening try in the final against Munster, with Scarlets eventually running out as 46–22 winners at the Aviva Stadium.

In 2017, it was announced that Williams would join Premiership Rugby side Saracens in England on a three-year contract from the 2017–18 season. In the 2018–19 season, Williams helped Saracens to both the Premiership title and the European Rugby Champions Cup. In the Premiership final against Exeter Chiefs, Williams scored a try. He left Saracens with a record of 21 tries in 31 Saracens appearances and a 90.5% win rate in the Aviva Premiership having won 19 of 21 games played.

Williams returned to Scarlets with immediate effect on 25 February 2020. Following an injury-hit period with Scarlets it was announced on 6 January 2022 that Williams would join Cardiff ahead of the 2022–23 season.

In November 2024, Williams announced he would be leaving the Kubota Spears in favour of a move back to the UK for family reasons. Later that week, he returned to Saracens for the remainder of the 2024–25 season. Williams made a try-scoring second debut for the club in a Champions Cup win against Stade Français in December 2024. In May 2025, it was announced that would be leaving the club at the end of the season.

In March 2026, after suffering with an ongoing knee injury during his time at Newcastle Red Bulls, Williams announced his retirement from professional rugby.

== International ==
=== Wales ===
Capped by Wales at U20 level in 2011, in both the Six Nations and World Rugby Junior Championships, Williams was named in the senior Wales training squad for the first time for the match versus Australia on 3 December 2011. He went on to make his debut for Wales against the Barbarians on 2 June 2012 at the Millennium Stadium.

Williams made his Six Nations debut against Ireland in Round 2 of the 2014 Six Nations Championship, going on to play in each subsequent match of that tournament. He scored his first international try and was named Man of the Match in the final game, a 51–3 win against Scotland.

Williams was called up to the Wales squad for the 2015 Rugby World Cup, despite being a doubt following surgery on his foot in June 2015. Williams started at full-back for the first two pool games – however, both games ended prematurely. Against Uruguay, Williams was withdrawn due to a first half dead leg before returning for the England game. Against England, Williams received a kick to the head following a punt attempt by Tom Wood. Wood managed to avoid a ban for the kick, with citing commissioner Maurizio Vancini preferring to give a warning. Williams returned for the final pool game against Australia, starting the defeat on the wing. This game saw Williams suffer a new foot injury and prematurely ended his participation in the tournament.

On 17 November 2018, Williams won his 50th Wales cap in an autumn international match against Tonga, scoring two tries as Wales ran out as 74–24 winners.

Williams secured his first Grand Slam with Wales during the 2019 Six Nations Championship. Williams started every game at 15 and contributed a Man of the Match performance in the 21–13 win over England on 23 February 2019. This win also sealed Wales' 12th consecutive test win – beating the previous record of 11, set between 1907 and 1910.

In September 2019, Williams was selected as part of the Wales squad for 2019 Rugby World Cup. Williams entered the tournament as first choice full-back and started at 15 in each game he played as Wales reached the semi-finals. Williams scored his first Rugby World Cup try on 23 September 2019 in the opening game against Georgia. After impressing in the 29–25 win against Australia, Williams scored again in the following game against Fiji, helping Wales to secure their qualification for the quarter-finals. After overcoming France and booking their place in the semi-finals, Williams suffered an ankle injury ahead of the game, ruling him out of the rest of the tournament.

In November 2024, Williams announced he would be leaving the Kubota Spears. A move back to a club in the UK would likely mean that he is available for selection for Wales for the 2025 Six Nations. In January 2025, he returned to the starting lineup in the opening game of the 2025 Six Nations, a defeat to France.

In January 2026, he confirmed his retirement from international rugby.

=== British & Irish Lions ===
In April 2017, Williams was selected for the 2017 British & Irish Lions tour to New Zealand. Williams played in the games against the Blues, Crusaders and Chiefs, at full-back and wing. He began the first test at full-back, contributing to a try by Sean O'Brien that was the stand out score of the series. In the second test, Williams again contributed to the first Lions try, providing an assist to Taulupe Faletau as the Lions ran out 24–21 winners. He then played in the final test, securing a series draw. Williams ended the tour having made 344 metres during his 414 minutes on the field with 12 defenders beaten and 47 carries made.

Williams was selected for his second British and Irish Lions tour in May 2021 against the World Cup holders South Africa. He appeared as a replacement in the first test victory, but was dropped from the match day 23 for the second test. Williams then started the final test on 7 August 2021, taking his total Lions appearances to 5.

=== International tries ===
Try	Opponent	Location	Venue	Competition	Date	Result
1	Scotland	Cardiff, Wales	Millennium Stadium	2014 Six Nations	15 March 2014	Win
2	Italy	Rome, Italy	Stadio Olimpico	2015 Six Nations	21 March 2015	Win
3	Italy	Cardiff, Wales	Millennium Stadium	2016 Six Nations	19 March 2016	Win
4	New Zealand	Wellington, New Zealand	Westpac Stadium	2016 Tour of New Zealand	18 June 2016	Loss
5	Argentina	Cardiff, Wales	Millennium Stadium	2016 Autumn Internationals	12 November 2016	Win
6	Italy	Rome, Italy	Stadio Olimpico	2017 Six Nations	5 February 2017	Win
7	England	Cardiff, Wales	Millennium Stadium	2017 Six Nations	11 February 2017	Loss
8	Scotland	Edinburgh, Scotland	Murrayfield	2017 Six Nations	25 February 2017	Loss
9	France	Cardiff, Wales	Millennium Stadium	2018 Six Nations	17 March 2018	Win
10	Tonga	Cardiff, Wales	Millennium Stadium	2018 Autumn Internationals	17 November 2018	Win
11	Tonga	Cardiff, Wales	Millennium Stadium	2018 Autumn Internationals	17 November 2018	Win
12	South Africa	Cardiff, Wales	Millennium Stadium	2018 Autumn Internationals	24 November 2018	Win
13	Georgia	Toyota, Japan	Toyota Stadium	2019 Rugby World Cup	23 September 2019	Win
14	Fiji	Oita, Japan	Bank Dome	2019 Rugby World Cup	9 October 2019	Win
15	Scotland	Edinburgh, Scotland	Murrayfield	2021 Six Nations	13 February 2021	Win
16	England	Cardiff, Wales	Millennium Stadium	2021 Six Nations	27 February 2021	Win
17	Fiji	Cardiff, Wales	Millennium Stadium	2021 Autumn Internationals	14 November 2021	Win
18	Ireland	Cardiff, Wales	Millennium Stadium	2023 Six Nations	4 February 2023	Loss
19	Italy	Rome, Italy	Stadio Olimpico	2023 Six Nations	11 March 2023	Win
20	Georgia	Nantes, France	Stade de la Beaujoire	2023 Rugby World Cup	7 October 2023	Win
21	Australia	Melbourne, Australia	Melbourne Rectangular Stadium	2024 Summer Internationals	13 July 2024	Loss

== Personal life ==
Williams is known by the nickname Sanjay, which he has had since he was young. He currently lives with his Welsh model wife Sophie Harries having been together since 2015. They were married in a ceremony on 30 July 2022. Williams has spoken previously about his struggles with a stammer which was exacerbated by the pressures of conducting press interviews. Williams has sought therapy to resolve this and has conducted more interviews since. Williams is known for his unusual running style stemming from bowing of his legs. This does not impact his performances and has not been corrected following advice from doctors that doing so could end his career.
