= Carlo Canna =

Italian rugby union player

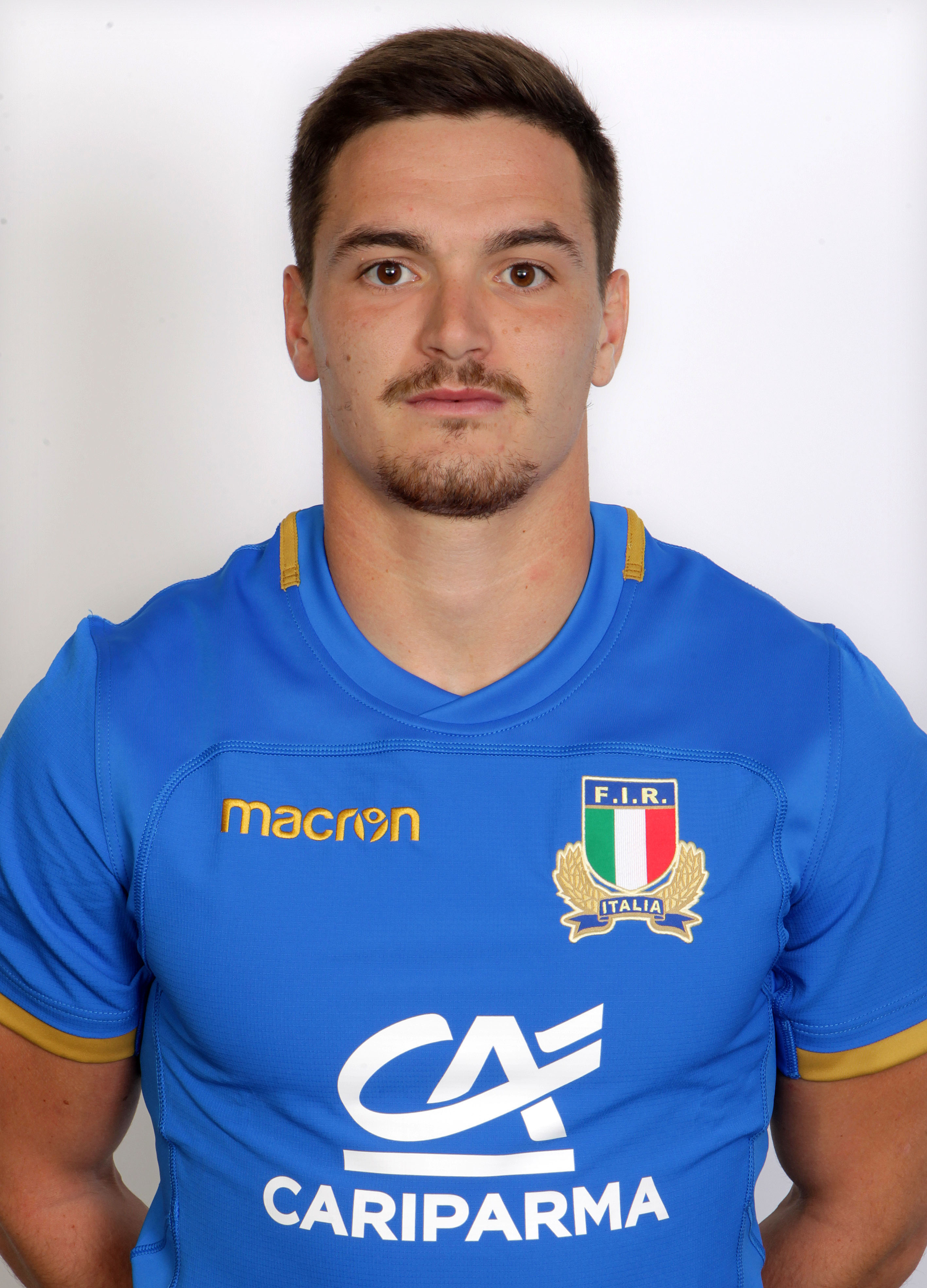
- Born: Carlo Canna; 25 August 1992 (age 34) Benevento, Italy
- Height: 1.90 m (6 ft 3 in)
- Weight: 93 kg (14 st 9 lb; 205 lb)
- Notable relative: Gerardo Canna (Father)

Rugby union career
- Position: Fly-half/ Inside Centre
Senior career
Years	Team	Apps	(Points)
2010−12	Gladiatori Sanniti	43	(177)
2012-2015	Fiamme Oro	54	(128)
2015−2022	Zebre	118	(717)
2022−	Fiamme Oro		
- Correct as of 21 May 2022
International career
Years	Team	Apps	(Points)
2014-2015	Emerging Italy	5	(34)
2015-	Italy	53	(152)
2022	Italy A	1	(6)
- Correct as of 24 Jun 2022

Carlo Canna (born 25 August 1992) is an Italian rugby union player, who regularly plays Fly-half or Inside Centre and plays for Fiamme Oro Rugby in the Top10.

== Biography ==
Canna, who grew up in Benevento, followed in his father's footsteps, and joined the Polizia di Stato in 2012 aged 20. Canna, like his father, Gerardo, joined the State Police sports team, and represented Fiamme Oro Rugby in the National Championship of Excellence, Italy's semi-professional rugby tournament, and Coppa Italia, Italy's second competition behind the NCE.

In 2014, Canna was a key figure in the team that earned them the Coppa Italia title, which saw him be selected for Italy's second national team, Emerging Italy. During the 2014 Tbilisi Cup, Canna came off the bench to earn only 2 appearances. However, during the 2015 Tbilisi Cup, he was the starting Fly-half in all three games, which saw Emerging Italy finish second behind Emerging Ireland, and ahead of international teams Georgia and Uruguay. Canna was the top point scorer during the 2015 Tbilisi Cup with 29 points.

In April 2015, Canna signed his first professional contract, with Zebre, which would see Carlo compete at the highest level in Europe, competing in the Pro12 and European Rugby Challenge Cup. On 14 July 2015, Italian first choice Fly-half Kelly Haimona withdrew form the national team's 2015 Rugby World Cup training squad due to injury, which saw Canna called up to the squad, despite not playing any professional rugby with Zebre. On 22 August 2015, he made his international debut, coming off the bench in Italy's first Rugby World Cup warm-up against Scotland, which saw Scotland win 16–12 in Turin. He played 13 matches, starting 11, playing 816 minutes, scoring 1 try, 15 conversions and 15 penalties contributing 80 points in the 2015-2016 - Guinness PRO12 series.

On 24 August 2015, Canna was named in the final 31-man squad for the 2015 Rugby World Cup. On 18 August 2019, he was also named in the final 31-man squad for the 2019 Rugby World Cup. On 26 May he was called in Italy A squad for the South African tour in the 2022 mid-year rugby union tests against Namibia and Currie Cup XV team.

Canna played with Zebre from 2015 to 2022 with 118 caps and 717 points.
