= Marius Mitrea =

Romania rugby union referee

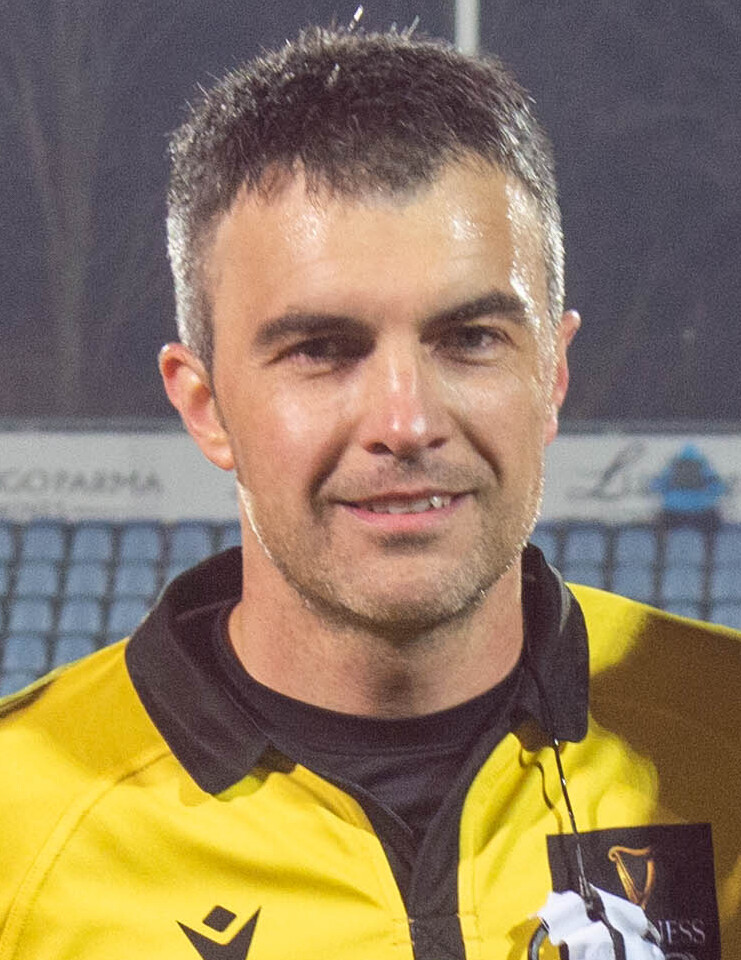
- Born: Marius Mitrea; 25 February 1982 (age 44) Galați, Romania

Rugby union career
Refereeing career
Years	Competition	Apps
2011–	Pro12/Pro14	
2010–	Test matches	

Marius Mitrea (born 25 February 1982) is a rugby union referee who represents the Italian Rugby Federation.

Born in Romania, Mitrea moved to Treviso, Italy in 1999 after he finished high school, where he learnt Italian, Spanish, French and English on top of his first Romanian language. While in Galați, Marius played for his local age-grade rugby team and continued with the sport once moved to Italy. In 2006 he took up refereeing, and in 2007 he refereed his first match, CUS Padova U15 vs Casale U15 in Padua.

Professionally, Mitrea started refereeing in the National Championship of Excellence in 2009 and made the step up to European rugby during the 2011–12 Pro12 - his first match being Connacht vs Scarlets on 10 September 2011. He also debuted at European level, refereeing during the 2011–12 European Challenge Cup before making the jump up to the Heineken Cup in 2013.

He made his international debut in 2010, where he refereed Belgium vs Canada in Brussels. He later refereed in the European Nations Cup before making his Six Nations Championship debut as an assistant referee in 2014 Six Nations Championship. In 2013 he was on the referee panel for the 2013 IRB Junior World Championship, where he refereed 3 matches, including the 7th place game between Australia and Ireland.

In September 2015, he went to the 2015 Rugby World Cup as an assistant referee.
