= 2018–19 Pro14 =

International rugby union competition season

- Countries: Ireland; Italy; Scotland; South Africa; Wales
- Date: 31 August 2018 – 25 May 2019
- Champions: Leinster (6th title)
- Runners-up: Glasgow Warriors
- Matches played: 152
- Attendance: 1,252,435 (average 8,240 per match)
- Highest attendance: 51,297; Dragons v Scarlets, Cardiff v Ospreys (27 April 2019)
- Lowest attendance: 1,142; Kings v Leinster (4 November 2018)
- Tries scored: 881 (average 5.8 per match)
- Top point scorer: Jack Carty (Connacht) (157 points)
- Top try scorer: Rabz Maxwane (Cheetahs) (14 tries)

Official website
- www.pro14rugby.org

The 2018–19 Pro14 (also known as the Guinness Pro14 for sponsorship reasons) is the eighteenth season of the professional rugby union competition originally known as the Celtic League. It was the second season to be referred to as the Pro14 (the competition was named the Pro12 immediately prior to the addition of two South African teams).

Fourteen teams competed in 2018-19 — four Irish teams: Connacht, Leinster, Munster and Ulster; two Italian teams: Benetton and Zebre; two Scottish teams: Edinburgh and Glasgow Warriors; two South African teams: Cheetahs and the Southern Kings; and four Welsh teams: Cardiff Blues, Dragons, Ospreys and Scarlets.

Leinster were the defending champions, having won the 2017–18 final at the Aviva Stadium to take their fifth title in the competition's various iterations and seal a domestic league and European Cup double, becoming only the sixth team to do so and the first from the Pro14.

== Teams ==
Location of Irish, Scottish and Welsh teams:	Location of Italian teams: Location of South African teams:
Conference A; Conference B.

Team	Coach / Director of Rugby	Captain	Stadium/s	Capacity
(Italy) Benetton	(New Zealand) Kieran Crowley	(Italy) Dean Budd	Stadio Comunale di Monigo	6,700
(Wales) Cardiff Blues	(Australia) John Mulvihill	(Wales) Ellis Jenkins	Cardiff Arms Park	12,125
(South Africa) Cheetahs	(South Africa) Franco Smith	(South Africa) Oupa Mohojé	Free State Stadium	48,000
(Ireland) Connacht	(Australia) Andy Friend	(Australia) Jarrad Butler	Galway Sportsgrounds	8,129
(Wales) Dragons	(Wales) Ceri Jones (Note: Dragons started the season with Bernard Jackman as head coach but he was dismissed from the role in December 2018, with Ceri Jones taking over for the remainder of the season.)	(Wales) Cory Hill	Rodney Parade	8,700
(Scotland) Edinburgh	(England) Richard Cockerill	(Scotland) Stuart McInally	Murrayfield Stadium	67,144 (Note: Although Murrayfield's full capacity is 67,144, only the lower section of the East Stand, with a capacity of 12,464, is generally opened for Edinburgh fixtures.)
(Scotland) Glasgow Warriors	(New Zealand) Dave Rennie	(New Zealand) Callum Gibbins (Scotland) Ryan Wilson	Scotstoun Stadium	7,351 (Note: Scotstoun's capacity can be expanded up to 10,000 with temporary seating.)
(Ireland) Leinster	(Ireland) Leo Cullen	(Ireland) Johnny Sexton	RDS Arena; Aviva Stadium	18,500; 51,700
(Ireland) Munster	(South Africa) Johann van Graan	(Ireland) Peter O'Mahony	Thomond Park; Irish Independent Park	25,600 (Note: Thomond Park's official capacity is 25,600 but can be expanded up to 26,276 with temporary seating.); 8,008
(Wales) Ospreys	(Ireland) Allen Clarke	(Wales) Justin Tipuric	Liberty Stadium; Brewery Field	20,827; 8,000 (Note: On 17 September 2018, it was announced that due to a clash of fixtures between the Ospreys and Swansea City, and a potential short-turn around, Ospreys moved their fixture from the Liberty Stadium to Bridgend's Brewery Field.)
(Wales) Scarlets	(New Zealand) Wayne Pivac	(Wales) Ken Owens	Parc y Scarlets	14,870
(South Africa) Southern Kings	(South Africa) Deon Davids	(South Africa) Mike Willemse	Nelson Mandela Bay Stadium; NMU Stadium	48,459; 15,000
(Ireland) Ulster	(England) Dan McFarland	(Ireland) Rory Best	Kingspan Stadium	18,196
(Italy) Zebre	(Ireland) Michael Bradley	(Italy) Tommaso Castello	Stadio Sergio Lanfranchi; Stadio Luigi Zaffanella	5,000; 6,000

== Format ==
League Stage

The fourteen teams are split into two conferences of seven teams, with each conference featuring two teams from Ireland and Wales plus one team from Italy, Scotland and South Africa. To ensure a competitive balance, the teams are distributed approximately evenly between the conferences based upon their performance in the previous season.

The regular season is made up of 21 rounds –
6 home and 6 away games against each team in their own conference
7 games, either home or away, against the teams in the other conference
2 additional regional derbies

- Each Irish team plays the two Irish teams in the other conference, one at home and one away
- Each Welsh team plays the two Welsh teams in the other conference, one at home and one away
- The two Italian teams play each other twice, home and away
- The two Scottish teams play each other twice, home and away
- The two South African teams play each other twice, home and away

League Play-Offs

The first-placed teams in each conference are given a bye to the semi-finals with the second and third placed teams in each conference meeting in two quarter-finals for the two remaining semi-final places.

Qualification For Champions Cup

The South African teams cannot compete in the European Rugby Champions Cup. The top three eligible European teams in each conference automatically qualify for following year's Champions Cup. The fourth ranked eligible team in each conference meet in a play-off match with the winner taking the seventh Champions Cup place.

== Team changes ==
=== Ireland ===
Connacht came into the new season with a new head coach, after removing Kieran Keane from his position one year into a three-year deal. Former Australia sevens coach Andy Friend was named as his replacement in May 2018, joining on a three-year contract. The team also had a new captain for the season, following the retirement of John Muldoon, record-holder for appearances both for Connacht and in the league. In August 2018, Jarrad Butler was named as his replacement.

Like Connacht, Leinster had a new captain for the season. Isa Nacewa retired at the end of the 2017–18 season, after leading the province to an unprecedented Pro14-Champions Cup double. The team's all-time leading scorer Johnny Sexton was named as captain in August 2018, with Rhys Ruddock as his vice-captain. The team also had a new backs coach following the departure of Girvan Dempsey, who signed with English Premiership side Bath in May 2018. Former player Felipe Contepomi was announced as his replacement in June 2018. He joined from the Argentine Rugby Union where he had been serving both as part of the coaching staff of Super Rugby side, the Jaguares, and as head coach of Argentina XV, the country's second tier international side.

Munster came into the league without their all-time leading try scorer Simon Zebo. It was announced in October 2017 that he would leave the province at the end of the 2017–18 season, with French Top 14 side Racing 92 later being confirmed as his next club.

Following the departure of Les Kiss as the province's director of rugby in January 2018, Ulster confirmed in March 2018 that then-head coach Jono Gibbes would leave the province at the end of the season. In April 2018, the province announced that Scotland forwards coach Dan McFarland would be their new head coach, with the former Connacht and Glasgow assistant signing a three-year contract. However the Scottish Rugby Union insisted that McFarland must serve the nine-month notice period in his contract before joining Ulster, which would have left the province without a head coach until January 2019. In July 2018, it was announced that Ireland forwards coach Simon Easterby would work with the Ulster coaches on an interim basis ahead of McFarland's arrival. After a four-month standoff, an agreement was reached in August 2018 to allow McFarland to take up his position with Ulster with immediate effect. Another addition to the coaching staff was long-serving squad member and Ireland international Jared Payne, who was forced to retire in May 2018 due to a head injury suffered on the 2017 Lions tour. The province announced that he would serve as their new defence coach. Banbridge head coach Daniel Soper was confirmed as Ulster's skills coach in June 2018.

=== Italy ===
Having served as one of the team's co-captain's, Italy centre Tommaso Castello was named as the Zebre skipper for the season. He had previously shared the captaincy with George Biagi.

=== Scotland ===
After spending much of the previous two seasons playing in the 5,500-capacity Myreside Stadium, Edinburgh announced in February 2018 that they would be returning permanently to Murrayfield, their previous home. Due to the stadium's larger size making it inappropriate for permanent use, the Scottish Rugby Union also announced plans to develop another, smaller ground with a capacity of 7,800 in the grounds of Murrayfield, on what were previously training pitches. It was estimated that the development would cost the Union in the region of £5 million.

=== South Africa ===
The Cheetahs had a new captain for the 2018–19 season. It was announced in March 2018 that incumbent captain Francois Venter would leave the team at the end of the season, joining English side Worcester Warriors.

=== Wales ===
Cardiff Blues confirmed in September 2017 that then-head coach Danny Wilson would leave the club at the end of the 2017–18 season, with John Mulvihill being announced as their new head coach on a three-year contract in March 2018. Also departing the club was the team's most-capped player, Taufaʻao Filise. The Tongan international prop made his last appearance for the region in the final of the 2017–18 Challenge Cup, before retiring. In July 2018, Ellis Jenkins was named as the new team captain, replacing previous season's skipper Gethin Jenkins. Both players were also named as part of a 10-man "leadership group" within the squad.

In December 2018, Dragons parted company with head coach Bernard Jackman 18 months into a three-year deal. The team's forwards coach Ceri Jones was named as caretaker following Jackman's departure. In January 2019, it was announced that Jones would remain in the role until the end of the season.

The Ospreys were coached by Allen Clarke. He had started the previous season as the team's forwards coach, before being promoted to head coach on an interim basis in January 2018 following the sacking of Steve Tandy. In April 2018, it was announced that Clarke would take the job on a permanent basis and had signed a three-year contract. For the first time in eight seasons, the side came into the campaign with a new captain, with Justin Tipuric replacing Alun Wyn Jones in the role.

This was Wayne Pivac's final season in charge of the Scarlets, as it was announced in July 2018 that he would succeed Warren Gatland as Wales head coach. The agreement meant Pivac would take up the role following the 2019 World Cup.

== Table ==
2018–19 Pro14 table
Conference A
	Team	P	W	D	L	PF	PA	PD	TF	TA	TBP	LBP	PTS
1	(Scotland) Glasgow Warriors (RU)	21	16	0	5	621	380	+241	83	48	15	2	81
2	(Ireland) Munster (SF)	21	16	0	5	612	348	+264	82	44	11	2	77
3	(Ireland) Connacht (QF)	21	12	0	9	475	394	+81	60	55	7	6	61
4	(Wales) Ospreys (PO)	21	12	0	9	445	404	+41	53	47	6	4	58
5	(Wales) Cardiff Blues	21	10	0	11	497	451	+46	60	58	7	7	54
6	(South Africa) Cheetahs	21	8	1	12	541	606	−65	80	80	9	3	46
7	(Italy) Zebre	21	3	0	18	260	640	−380	35	85	5	2	19
Conference B
	Team	P	W	D	L	PF	PA	PD	TF	TA	TBP	LBP	PTS
1	(Ireland) Leinster (CH)	21	15	1	5	672	385	+287	95	49	12	2	76
2	(Ireland) Ulster (SF)	21	13	2	6	441	424	+17	58	54	6	1	63
3	(Italy) Benetton (QF)	21	11	2	8	474	431	+43	62	55	6	3	57
4	(Wales) Scarlets	21	10	0	11	510	470	+40	68	54	7	5	52
5	(Scotland) Edinburgh	21	10	0	11	431	436	−5	52	59	6	5	51
6	(Wales) Dragons	21	5	1	15	339	599	−260	37	84	1	3	26
7	(South Africa) Southern Kings	21	2	1	18	385	735	−350	54	107	5	7	22
If teams are level at any stage, tiebreakers are applied in the following order -: 1. number of matches won 2. the difference between points for and points against 3. the number of tries scored 4. the most points scored 5. the difference between tries for and tries against 6. the fewest red cards received 7. the fewest yellow cards received
Green background indicates teams that compete in the Pro14 play-offs, and also earn a place in the 2019–20 European Champions Cup (excluding South African teams who are ineligible); Blue background indicates teams outside the play-off places that earn a place in the 2019–20 European Champions Cup; Yellow background indicates the loser of the play-off between the two fourth-ranked European teams in each conference, that earned a place in the 2019–20 European Rugby Challenge Cup. Plain background indicates teams that earn a place in the 2019–20 European Rugby Challenge Cup. (CH) Champions. (RU) Runners-up. (SF) Losing semi-finalists. (QF) Losing quarter-finalists. (PO) Champions Cup play-off winners.

== Match summary ==
2018–19 Pro14 match summary
Home / Away		Conference A							Conference B						
Home / Away		BLU	CHE	CON	GLA	MUN	OSP	ZEB	BEN	DRA	EDI	KIN	LEI	SCA	ULS
Conference A	BLU	—	24–21	8–7	34–38	37–13	23–26	37–0		19–16		26–19	32–33	41–17	
Conference A	CHE	21–10	—	17–21	24–52	26–30	14–31	61–28	31–25	38–13		40–36			39–39
Conference A	CHE	21–10	—	17–21	24–52	26–30	14–31	61–28	31–25	38–13		61–25			39–39
Conference A	CON	29–22	25–17	—	26–27	24–31	46–5	32–13	29–14	33–12			3–20	33–20	21–12
Conference A	GLA	40–15	35–17	43–17	—	25–10	9–3	36–8		29–13	8–16			29–20	30–7
Conference A	GLA	40–15	35–17	43–17	—	25–10	9–3	36–8		29–13	34–10			29–20	30–7
Conference A	MUN	45–21	38–0	27–14	25–24	—	49–13	31–12			44–14	43–0	26–17		64–7
Conference A	OSP	20–11	46–14	22–17	20–29	13–19	—	43–0	27–10	29–20	17–13			19–12	0–8
Conference A	ZEB	26–24	12–27	5–6	10–42	7–32	8–22	—	8–10		34–16	32–16	24–40		
Conference A	ZEB	26–24	12–27	5–6	10–42	7–32	8–22	—	11–25		34–16	32–16	24–40		
Conference B	BEN	27–25			20–17	28–37		28–10	—	57–7	18–10	28–5	3–31	25–19	10–15
Conference B	DRA	15–23				7–8	23–22	16–5	17–21	—	18–12	27–22	10–59	34–32	15–28
Conference B	EDI	17–19	37–21	17–10	23–7				31–30	34–17	—	38–0	28–11	31–21	7–29
Conference B	KIN		17–24	14–31	38–28		7–43		19–22	18–18	25–21	—	31–38	34–41	7–28
Conference B	LEI		19–7	33–29	24–39	30–22	52–7		27–27	52–10	31–7	59–19	—	22–17	40–7
Conference B	SCA	5–34	43–21			10–6	20–17	42–0	38–29	22–13	12–20	54–14	23–21	—	29–12
Conference B	ULS	16–12		15–22		19–12		54–7	15–15	36–18	30–29	33–19	14–13	15–13	—

== Conference Rounds 1 to 21 ==
All times are local.

=== Round 1 ===
31 August 2018
19:35

(2 BP) Cardiff Blues (Wales)	32–33	(Ireland) Leinster (1 BP)
Try: Lee-Lo (2) 10' m, 48' c Harries (2) 37' c, 44' c Con: Evans (3/4) 38', 46', 49'; Pen: Evans (2/2) 4', 70'	Report	Try: Tracy 26' m B. Byrne (2) 52' m, 77' c Gibson-Park 66' c Con: R. Byrne (2/4) 67', 78'; Pen: R. Byrne (3/3) 21', 32,’ 40'

Cardiff Arms Park
Attendance: 9,284
Referee: Nigel Owens (WRU)

31 August 2018
19:35

Ospreys (Wales)	17–13	(Scotland) Edinburgh (1 BP)
Try: North (2) 58' c, 68' c Con: S. Davies (2/2) 59', 69'; Pen: Price (1/2) 32'	Report	Try: Kinghorn 75' c Con: Van der Walt (1/1) 76'; Pen: Hickey (2/2) 30', 54'

Liberty Stadium
Attendance: 6,609
Referee: John Lacey (IRFU)

31 August 2018
20:35

(1 BP) Zebre (Italy)	32–16	(South Africa) Southern Kings
Try: Fabiani 4' c Bellini 36' c Tuivaiti 54' c Tauyavuca 79' m Con: Canna (3/4) 5', 37', 56'; Pen: Canna (2/2) 14', 67'	Report	Try: Botha 15' c Con: Banda (1/1) 16'; Pen: Banda (3/3) 49', 52', 59'

Stadio Sergio Lanfranchi
Attendance: 3,000
Referee: Mike Adamson (SRU)

1 September 2018
15:00

(1 BP) Connacht (Ireland)	26–27	(Scotland) Glasgow Warriors (1 BP)
Try: Kelleher 14' c Bealham 21' c Con: J. Carty (2/2) 16', 22'; Pen: J. Carty (4/5) 11', 34', 40', 42'	Report	Try: Seymour 1' m Turner 17' c Wilson 31' m Ashe 64' c Con: P. Horne (1/3) 18'; Hogg (1/1) 65'; Drop: Hogg (1/1) 73'

Galway Sportsgrounds
Attendance: 5,329
Referee: Ian Davies (WRU)

1 September 2018
17:15

(1 BP) Munster (Ireland)	38–0	(South Africa) Cheetahs
Try: R. Scannell 15' m Kilcoyne 30' c O'Donnell 52' m Hanrahan 65' c O'Callaghan 70' c Sweetnam 72' c Con: Hanrahan (4/6) 31', 66', 71', 73'	Report

Thomond Park
Attendance: 12,265
Referee: Dan Jones (WRU)

1 September 2018
17:15

Ulster (Ireland)	15–13	(Wales) Scarlets (1 BP)
Pen: Cooney (5/7) 12', 16', 24', 58', 79'	Report	Try: Patchell 6' c Con: Patchell (1/1) 7'; Pen: D. Jones (2/2) 54', 61'

Kingspan Stadium
Attendance: 11,882
Referee: Marius Mitrea (FIR)

1 September 2018
19:35

(1 BP) Dragons (Wales)	17–21	(Italy) Benetton
Try: Howells 1' c R. Williams 74' c Con: Henson (1/1) 1'; Lewis (1/1) 74'; Pen: Henson (1/1) 44'	Report	Try: Zanni (2) 5' m, 55' m Steyn 51' m Pen: Allan (2/2) 28', 32'

Rodney Parade
Attendance: 4,613
Referee: George Clancy (IRFU)

=== Round 2 ===
7 September 2018
19:35

Glasgow Warriors (Scotland)	25–10	(Ireland) Munster
Try: Gibbins 22' m Hogg 28' c Ashe 36' c Con: Hogg (2/2) 29', 36'; Pen: Horne (1/2) 14'; Hogg (1/1) 72'	Report	Try: Marshall 69' c Con: Carbery (1/1) 70'; Pen: Hanrahan (1/1) 43'

Scotstoun Stadium
Attendance: 7,351
Referee: Ben Whitehouse (WRU)

7 September 2018
19:35

Ulster (Ireland)	30–29	(Scotland) Edinburgh (1 BP)
Try: Addison 53' c Cooney 60' c Gilroy 67' c Con: Cooney (3/3) 54', 62', 69'; Pen: Cooney (3/3) 20', 26', 81'	Report	Try: Brown 14' c Johnstone 46' c Con: Hickey (2/2) 15', 48'; Pen: Hickey (5/5) 3', 9', 22', 56', 79'

Kingspan Stadium
Attendance: 11,994
Referee: Stuart Berry (SARU)

8 September 2018
15:00

Dragons (Wales)	27–22	(South Africa) Southern Kings (2 BP)
Try: Griffiths 3' c Wainwright 13' c Lewis 66' c Con: Lewis (3/3) 4', 14', 67'; Pen: Lewis (2/4) 21', 62'	Report	Try: Willemse 27' m Basson 30' m Masimla 55' c Penxe 79' m Con: Banda (1/4) 56'

Rodney Parade
Attendance: 4,012
Referee: Frank Murphy (IRFU)

8 September 2018
17:15

(1 BP) Connacht (Ireland)	32–13	(Italy) Zebre
Try: Boyle (2) 8' c, 20' c Blade 47' m Griffin 59' m Adeolokun 69' m Con: J. Carty (2/5) 8', 21'; Pen: J. Carty (1/2) 2'	Report	Try: Bisegni 78' c Con: Brummer (1/1) 78'; Pen: Canna (2/2) 25', 52'

Galway Sportsgrounds
Attendance: 4,056
Referee: Lloyd Linton (SRU)

8 September 2018
17:30

(1 BP) Ospreys (Wales)	46–14	(South Africa) Cheetahs
Try: A. Jones (2) 7' c, 77' m Otten 27' c North 36' m Jeffries 58' c Tipuric (2) 62' c, 72' m Con: S. Davies (4/7) 8', 27', 59', 63'; Pen: S. Davies (1/1) 40'	Report	Try: Wiese 17' c Maxwane 69' c Con: Schoeman (2/2) 18', 69'

Liberty Stadium
Attendance: 6,155
Referee: Andrew Brace (IRFU)

8 September 2018
19:35

Scarlets (Wales)	23–21	(Ireland) Leinster (1 BP)
Try: Owens 11' c G. Davies 68' c Con: Halfpenny (2/2) 12', 69'; Pen: Halfpenny (3/3) 34', 50', 63'	Report	Try: McFadden 24' c Lowe 42' c Ruddock 74' c Con: R. Byrne (3/3) 25', 43', 74'

Parc y Scarlets
Attendance: 7,258
Referee: Mike Adamson (SRU)

8 September 2018
20:35

Benetton (Italy)	27–25	(Wales) Cardiff Blues (1 BP)
Try: Allan 28' c Steyn 50' c Ioane 80+3' c Con: Allan (3/3) 28', 51', 80+4'; Pen: Allan (2/2) 11', 54'	Report	Try: Penalty try 33'; Pen: Evans (3/5) 20', 37', 41'; Anscombe (3/3) 57', 68', 72'

Stadio Comunale di Monigo
Attendance: 2,400
Referee: Sean Gallagher (IRFU)

=== Round 3 ===
14 September 2018
19:35

Edinburgh (Scotland)	17–10	(Ireland) Connacht (1 BP)
Try: Van der Merwe 25' c Schoeman 55' c Con: Van der Walt (2/2) 26', 55'; Pen: Van der Walt (1/1) 41'	Report	Try: Adeolokun 61' c Con: J. Carty (1/1) 62'; Pen: J. Carty (1/1) 75'

Murrayfield Stadium
Attendance: 5,239
Referee: Ian Davies (WRU)

14 September 2018
19:35

(1 BP) Munster (Ireland)	49–13	(Wales) Ospreys
Try: Penalty try 15'; Carbery 21' c J. Cronin 27' c Marshall (2) 41' c, 42' c Botha 45' c Sweetnam 62' c Con: Carbery (5/5) 22', 28', 42', 43', 45'; Keatley (1/1) 63'	Report	Try: L. Morgan 60' c Con: S. Davies (1/1) 61'; Pen: S. Davies (2/2) 20', 26'

Irish Independent Park
Attendance: 8,008
Referee: Stuart Berry (SARU)

15 September 2018
17:15

(1 BP) Leinster (Ireland)	52–10	(Wales) Dragons
Try: Cronin 9' c van der Flier 44' c Gibson-Park (2) 45' c, 57' c Larmour 48' c Furlong 63' c Fardy 76' c Con: Sexton (6/6) 10', 45', 46', 49', 58', 64'; Reid (1/1) 77'; Pen: Sexton (1/1) 30'	Report	Try: J. Williams 59' c Con: Robson (1/1) 60'; Pen: J. Lewis (1/1) 42'

RDS Arena
Attendance: 13,976
Referee: Quinton Immelman (SARU)

15 September 2018
17:15

(1 BP) Scarlets (Wales)	38–29	(Italy) Benetton (1 BP)
Try: G. Davies (2) 4' c, 34' m Fonotia 11' m McNicholl 59' c Kennedy 63' c Prydie 80' c Con: Halfpenny (4/6) 4', 60', 64', 80'	Report	Try: Quaglio 9' c Ferrari 14' c Ioane 41' m Allan 45' c Con: Allan (3/4) 10', 16', 46'; Pen: Allan (1/1) 69'

Parc y Scarlets
Attendance: 7,180
Referee: Sam Grove-White (SRU)

15 September 2018
19:30

(1 BP) Cheetahs (South Africa)	24–52	(Scotland) Glasgow Warriors (1 BP)
Try: Small-Smith 8' m Jaer (2) 11' c, 54' m Lee 29' c Con: Janse van Rensburg (1/1) 12'; Schoeman (1/3) 30'	Report	Try: Hastings 1' c Price (2) 24' c, 45' c Seymour 41' c Van der Merwe 41' c Gibbins 64' c G. Horne 75' c Con: Hastings (7/7) 2', 25', 42', 45', 51', 65', 76'; Pen: Hastings (1/1) 61'

Toyota Stadium
Attendance: 4,700
Referee: Frank Murphy (IRFU)

15 September 2018
20:35

(1 BP) Zebre (Italy)	26–24	(Wales) Cardiff Blues (1 BP)
Try: Canna 14' c Meyer 64' c Brummer 71' c Fabiani 78' m Con: Canna (3/4) 16', 65', 72'	Report	Try: Robinson 1' c Dacey 4' c Anscombe 10' c Con: Anscombe (3/3) 2', 5', 10'; Pen: Anscombe (1/2) 53'

Stadio Sergio Lanfranchi
Attendance: 2,500
Referee: George Clancy (IRFU)

16 September 2018
13:15

Southern Kings (South Africa)	7–28	(Ireland) Ulster
Try: Willemse 42' c Con: Banda (1/1) 43'	Report	Try: Coetzee 60' c Kernohan 66' m A. Curtis 80' c Con: Burns (1/2) 61'; Nelson (1/1) 80'; Pen: Cooney (3/3) 4', 9', 26'

Nelson Mandela Bay Stadium
Attendance: 5,096
Referee: Lloyd Linton (SRU)

=== Round 4 ===
21 September 2018
19:15

(1 BP) Cheetahs (South Africa)	39–39	(Ireland) Ulster (1 BP)
Try: Olivier 1' c Small-Smith 37' c Dweba 52' m Du Toit 63' c Maxwane 74' c Con: Schoeman (3/4) 2', 38', 64'; Fouché (1/1) 74'; Pen: Schoeman (1/1) 18'; Fouché (1/1) 78'	Report	Try: Shanahan (2) 3' c, 21' c Stewart 67' m Penalty try 73'; Speight 80' c Con: Burns (3/4) 4', 22', 80'; Pen: Burns (2/2) 45', 55'

Toyota Stadium
Attendance: 5,063
Referee: Ben Whitehouse (WRU)

21 September 2018
19:35

(1 BP) Cardiff Blues (Wales)	37–13	(Ireland) Munster
Try: N. Williams 6' c T. Williams (2) 16' c, 76' c Halaholo 44' c Con: Anscombe (4/4) 7', 17', 45', 77'; Pen: Anscombe (3/3) 52', 63', 70'	Report	Try: Conway (2) 10' m, 13' c Pen: Carbery (1/1) 23'

Cardiff Arms Park
Attendance: 7,284
Referee: Quinton Immelman (SARU)

22 September 2018
15:00

(1 BP) Southern Kings (South Africa)	38–28	(Scotland) Glasgow Warriors (1 BP)
Try: Penxe 5' c Du Toit (2) 9' c, 71' c Van Rooyen 18' c Klaasen 52' c Con: Banda (5/5) 6', 10', 18', 52', 72'; Pen: Banda (1/1) 40'	Report	Try: Grigg 59' c Van der Merwe (2) 63' c, 80' c Brown 76' c Con: Hastings (4/4) 59', 64', 76', 80+1'

NMU Stadium
Attendance: 3,160
Referee: Andrew Brace (IRFU)

22 September 2018
17:15

Connacht (Ireland)	33–20	(Wales) Scarlets
Try: Farrell 4' c Kelleher 25' c Adeolokun 74' c Con: J. Carty (3/3) 5', 26', 76'; Pen: J. Carty (4/4) 16', 40', 62', 69'	Report	Try: McNicholl 28' c Prydie 71' c Con: Halfpenny (1/1) 8'; Patchell (1/1) 71'; Pen: Halfpenny (2/2) 8', 20'

Galway Sportsgrounds
Attendance: 5,839
Referee: Marius Mitrea (FIR)

22 September 2018
17:15

Dragons (Wales)	16–5	(Italy) Zebre
Try: Robson 13' m Howells 40' m Pen: Robson (1/2) 4'; J. Williams (1/1) 43'	Report	Try: Bellini 21' m

Rodney Parade
Attendance: 4,104
Referee: Joy Neville (IRFU)

22 September 2018
19:35

(1 BP) Leinster (Ireland)	31–7	(Scotland) Edinburgh
Try: McFadden 15' c Lowe 37' m Larmour 49' c Sexton 63' c Ringrose 78' m Con: Sexton (3/5) 17’, 50’, 64’,	Report	Try: Bradbury 44' c Con: Van der Walt (1/1) 45'

RDS Arena
Attendance: 13,476
Referee: Dan Jones (WRU)

22 September 2018
19:35

Ospreys (Wales)	27–10	(Italy) Benetton
Try: D. Evans 32' c Tipuric 43' c S. Davies 71' c Con: S. Davies (3/3) 33', 44', 72'; Pen: S. Davies (2/2) 12', 58'	Report	Try: Steyn 53' c Con: McKinley (1/1) 55'; Pen: Rizzi (1/1) 22'

Liberty Stadium
Attendance: 6,405
Referee: Mike Adamson (SRU)

=== Round 5 ===
28 September 2018
19:35

Cardiff Blues (Wales)	24–21	(South Africa) Cheetahs (1 BP)
Try: Lee-Lo 25' c L. Williams 64' c Robinson 69' c Con: Anscombe (3/3) 26', 65', 70'; Pen: Anscombe (1/2) 38'	Report	Try: Steenkamp 18' c Maxwane 49' c van Rensburg 58' c Con: Schoeman (3/3) 19', 50', 59'

Cardiff Arms Park
Attendance: 6,187
Referee: George Clancy (IRFU)

28 September 2018
19:35

(1 BP) Edinburgh (Scotland)	31–30	(Italy) Benetton (2 BP)
Try: Scott 17' c Van der Merwe 20' c Kinghorn 34' c Fife 47' c Con: Hickey (4/4) 18', 21', 35', 49'; Pen: Hickey (1/2) 4'	Report	Try: Sperandio (3) 23' m, 51' m, 60' m Fuser 40' c Barbini 71' m Con: Allan (1/3) 40'; Pen: Allan (1/1) 1'

Murrayfield Stadium
Attendance: 4,392
Referee: Nigel Owens (WRU)

29 September 2018
16:00

Zebre (Italy)	8–22	(Wales) Ospreys
Try: Tuivaiti 70' m Pen: Canna (1/1) 35'	Report	Try: Morgan 13' c Con: S. Davies (1/1) 13'; Pen: S. Davies (4/4) 2', 40', 54', 74'; Drop: S. Davies (1/1) 29'

Stadio Sergio Lanfranchi
Attendance: 3,000
Referee: Frank Murphy (IRFU)

29 September 2018
17:15

Connacht (Ireland)	3–20	(Ireland) Leinster
Pen: J. Carty (1/1) 2'	Report	Try: Ringrose 40' c Cronin 55' c Con: Sexton (2/2) 41', 56'; Pen: Sexton (2/2) 34', 40'

Galway Sportsgrounds
Attendance: 8,129
Referee: John Lacey (IRFU)

29 September 2018
18:30

(1 BP) Scarlets (Wales)	54–14	(South Africa) Southern Kings
Try: Jo. Davies (2) 9' c, 24' c Asquith 15' c Nicholas 42' c Davis 58' c Gardiner 65' m St. Evans 72' c Hardy 80' c Con: Patchell (5/5) 10', 16', 24', 43', 59'; O'Brien (2/3) 74', 80'	Report	Try: Basson (2) 20' c, 33' c Con: Banda (2/2) 21', 34'

Parc y Scarlets
Attendance: 7,529
Referee: Sean Gallagher (IRFU)

29 September 2018
19:35

(1 BP) Glasgow Warriors (Scotland)	29–13	(Wales) Dragons
Try: Kebble 4' c L. Jones (2) 37' m, 41' m H. Jones 54' m Dunbar 77' c Con: Hastings (2/5) 5', 78'	Report	Try: Warren 45' c Con: Lewis (1/1) 46'; Pen: Robson (2/2) 7', 20'

Scotstoun Stadium
Attendance: 7,135
Referee: Stuart Berry (SARU)

29 September 2018
19:35

(1 BP) Munster (Ireland)	64–7	(Ireland) Ulster
Try: Goggin (2) 5' c, 37' c O'Donnell (2) 8' c, 30' m P. O'Mahony 50' c Carbery 62' c Arnold 66' c Earls 70' c Wootton 77' c Con: Carbery (5/6) 5', 9', 37', 51', 63'; Keatley (3/3) 67', 71', 78'; Pen: Carbery (1/1) 16'	Report	Try: Cave 46' c Con: Burns (1/1) 47'

Thomond Park
Attendance: 13,907
Referee: Dan Jones (WRU)

=== Round 6 ===
5 October 2018
19:35

(1 BP) Edinburgh (Scotland)	37–21	(South Africa) Cheetahs
Try: Toolis 20' c Graham 38' c Mata 64' c Ritchie 77' c Con: Hickey (4/4) 21', 40', 65', 79'; Pen: Hickey (3/3) 4', 9', 52'	Report	Try: Lee 35' c Maxwane (2) 42' c, 48' c Con: Schoeman (3/3) 36', 44', 49'

Murrayfield Stadium
Attendance: 4,555
Referee: Marius Mitrea (FIR)

5 October 2018
19:35

(1 BP) Glasgow Warriors (Scotland)	36–8	(Italy) Zebre
Try: H. Jones 5' c Turner 54' c Peterson 63' c G. Horne 65' c P. Horne 75' m Con: Hastings (4/5) 6', 56', 64', 66'; Pen: Hastings (1/1) 38'	Report	Try: Tauyavuca 34' m Pen: Violi (1/1) 43'

Scotstoun Stadium
Attendance: 7,174
Referee: Quinton Immelman (SARU)

5 October 2018
19:35

(1 BP) Ulster (Ireland)	15–22	(Ireland) Connacht
Try: Stockdale 23' m Timoney 79' c Con: Cooney (1/2) 79'; Pen: Cooney (1/2) 52'	Report	Try: O'Halloran 5' c Aki 72' m Con: J. Carty (1/2) 6'; Pen: J. Carty (1/1) 67'

Kingspan Stadium
Attendance: 13,109
Referee: Andrew Brace (IRFU)

6 October 2018
15:00

Scarlets (Wales)	20–17	(Wales) Ospreys (1 BP)
Try: McNicholl 15' c Patchell 56' c Con: Patchell (2/2) 16', 57'; Pen: Patchell (2/2) 40', 50'	Report	Try: Allen 29' c North 32' m Morgan 61' m Con: S. Davies (1/3) 30'

Parc y Scarlets
Attendance: 12,012
Referee: Nigel Owens (WRU)

6 October 2018
17:15

Dragons (Wales)	15–23	(Wales) Cardiff Blues
Try: Lewis 11' m Rosser 18' c Con: J. Williams (1/1) 19'; Pen: J. Williams (1/1) 57'	Report	Try: Lane (2) 30' m, 64' c Dacey 60' m Con: Anscombe (1/3) 65'; Pen: Anscombe (2/3) 46', 55'

Rodney Parade
Attendance: 7,376
Referee: Ian Davies (WRU)

6 October 2018
18:00

Leinster (Ireland)	30–22	(Ireland) Munster
Try: Lowe (2) 14' c, 44' c Penalty try 10'; Con: Byrne (2/2) 15', 46'; Pen: Byrne (3/3) 32', 40', 69'	Report	Try: Beirne 19' m Stander 27' c Mathewson 66' c Con: Carbery (2/3) 28', 67'; Pen: Carbery (1/1) 55'

Aviva Stadium
Attendance: 50,120
Referee: Ben Whitehouse (WRU)

6 October 2018
20:00

(1 BP) Benetton (Italy)	28–5	(South Africa) Southern Kings
Try: Bigi 3' c Duvenage 16' c Penalty try (2) 22', 51'; Con: Allan (2/2) 5', 17'	Report	Try: Penxe 30' m

Stadio Comunale di Monigo
Attendance: 2,200
Referee: Craig Evans (WRU)

=== Round 7 ===
26 October 2018
19:00

(2 BP) Southern Kings (South Africa)	34–41	(Wales) Scarlets (1 BP)
Try: Banda 1' c Penxe 21' c H. Klaasen 48' c Basson 54' c Con: Banda (4/4) 2', 22', 49', 55'; Pen: Banda (2/2) 12', 33'	Report	Try: D. Hughes 27' c Boyde 39' m Nicholas 41' c Kruger 62' c Hardy 72' c T. Davies 77' m Con: D. Jones (4/6) 28', 42', 63', 73'; Pen: D. Jones (1/1) 16'

NMU Stadium
Attendance: 2,473
Referee: John Lacey (IRFU)

26 October 2018
20:00

(1 BP) Zebre (Italy)	34–16	(Scotland) Edinburgh
Try: Sisi 41' c Di Giulio 54' c Canna 72' c Castello 80' c Con: Canna (4/4) 42', 55', 72', 80'; Pen: Canna (2/2) 38', 49'	Report	Try: Graham 20' c Con: Hickey (1/1) 22'; Pen: Hickey (3/4) 6', 27', 45'

Stadio Sergio Lanfranchi
Attendance: 2,500
Referee: Andrew Brace (IRFU)

26 October 2018
19:55

(1 BP) Ulster (Ireland)	36–18	(Wales) Dragons
Try: Speight 10' c Shanahan 22' c Lowry 38' c McCloskey (2) 48' m, 78' c Con: McPhillips (4/5) 11', 23', 40', 78'; Pen: McPhillips (1/1) 6'	Report	Try: Taylor 30' c Sage 66' m Con: Tovey (1/2) 31'; Pen: Tovey (2/2) 15', 37'

Kingspan Stadium
Attendance: 12,559
Referee: Marius Mitrea (FIR)

26 October 2018
20:05

(1 BP) Ospreys (Wales)	22–17	(Ireland) Connacht (1BP)
Try: Giles (2) 1' m, 8' m H. Morgan 51' c D. Evans 79' m Con: S. Davies (1/4) 52'	Report	Try: Aki 64' c Butler 69' c Con: J. Carty (2/2) 66', 71'; Pen: J. Carty (1/1) 12'

Brewery Field, Bridgend
Attendance: 5,122
Referee: Mike Adamson (SRU)

27 October 2018
16:00

Benetton (Italy)	3–31	(Ireland) Leinster (1 BP)
Pen: Rizzi (1/1) 24'	Report	Try: A. Byrne 4' m Tracy 29' c C. O'Brien 49' c Porter 58' c Tomane 75' m Con: R. Byrne (3/4) 30', 50', 59'

Stadio Comunale di Monigo
Attendance: 2,485
Referee: Ben Whitehouse (WRU)

27 October 2018
18:15

Cheetahs (South Africa)	21–10	(Wales) Cardiff Blues
Try: Venter 7' c Maxwane (2) 10' c, 38' c Con: Schoeman (3/3) 8', 11', 39'	Report	Try: Manoa 64' c Con: Shingler (1/1) 65'; Pen: Shingler (1/1) 21'

Toyota Stadium
Attendance: 4,428
Referee: Lloyd Linton (SRU)

27 October 2018
17:15

Munster (Ireland)	25–24	(Scotland) Glasgow Warriors (2 BP)
Try: J. Cronin 8' c Wootton 65' m Mathewson 72' c Con: Hanrahan (1/1) 9'; Keatley (1/2) 73'; Pen: Hanrahan (1/1) 55'; R. Scannell (1/1) 80'	Report	Try: G. Horne (2) 23' m, 35' c M. Fagerson 48' m P. Horne 59' c Con: P. Horne (1/3) 36'; Thomson (1/1) 60'

Thomond Park
Attendance: 13,356
Referee: Dan Jones (WRU)

=== Round 8 ===
2 November 2018
19:35

(1 BP) Edinburgh (Scotland)	31–21	(Wales) Scarlets
Try: Mata (2) 7' c, 74' c Brown (2) 20' m, 28' m Schoeman 56' c Con: Hickey (2/4) 8', 76'; Socino (1/1) 57'	Report	Try: Williams 14' c Asquith 38' c McNicholl 49' c Con: D. Jones (3/3) 15', 39', 50'

Murrayfield Stadium
Attendance: 5,037
Referee: Ben O'Keeffe (NZRU)

2 November 2018
19:35

Ospreys (Wales)	20–29	(Scotland) Glasgow Warriors (1 BP)
Try: Cracknell 6' c Dirksen 74' c Con: S. Davies (2/2) 7', 74'; Pen: S. Davies (2/3) 25', 46'	Report	Try: Matawalu (3) 11' c, 14' c, 48' m Grigg 58' c Con: Thomson (3/4) 12', 15', 59'; Pen: Thomson (1/1) 3'

Liberty Stadium
Attendance: 6,399
Referee: Andrew Brace (IRFU)

3 November 2018
16:00

(1 BP) Benetton (Italy)	10–15	(Ireland) Ulster
Try: Faiva 2' c Con: Allan (1/1) 3'; Pen: Allan (1/1) 63'	Report	Try: Reidy 43' m Herring 53' c Con: Burns (1/2) 54'; Pen: Burns (1/1) 29'

Stadio Comunale di Monigo
Attendance: 2,497
Referee: Mike Adamson (SRU)

3 November 2018
17:15

(1 BP) Connacht (Ireland)	33–12	(Wales) Dragons
Try: Cannon 23' c Leader 26' m Fainga'a 29' c McCartney 39' c Farrell 69' c Con: Horwitz (3/4) 24', 30', 40'; J. Carty (1/1) 70'	Report	Try: Amos 56' m Basham 80' c Con: Tovey (1/2) 80'

Galway Sportsgrounds
Attendance: 5,146
Referee: Quinton Immelman (SARU)

4 November 2018
14:45

(2 BP) Southern Kings (South Africa)	31–38	(Ireland) Leinster (1 BP)
Try: Penxe 2' m Ungerer (2) 32' c, 42' c Klaasen 71' m van Schalkwyk 79' c Con: Banda (3/5) 33', 43', 79'	Report	Try: A. Byrne 15' m Penalty try 24'; Gibson-Park 36' c Leavy 38' c Deegan 40' c B. Byrne 63' m Con: Reid (3/5) 37', 38', 40'

NMU Stadium
Attendance: 1,142
Referee: Lloyd Linton (SRU)

4 November 2018
14:45

(1 BP) Cardiff Blues (Wales)	37–0	(Italy) Zebre
Try: T. Williams 16' m Myhill 47' c N. Williams 64' c Lee-Lo (2) 68' c, 80' m Con: Shingler (3/4) 48', 65', 68'; Pen: Shingler (2/2) 2', 26'	Report

Cardiff Arms Park
Attendance: 6,426
Referee: George Clancy (IRFU)

4 November 2018
16:45

(2 BP) Cheetahs (South Africa)	26–30	(Ireland) Munster (1 BP)
Try: Dweba (2) 26' m, 57' c Nché 51' c Smith 63' c Con: Schoeman (3/4) 52', 58', 64'	Report	Try: Botha 15' m O'Byrne 37' c L. Coombes 44' c Haley 68' m Con: Johnston (2/4) 39', 46'; Pen: Johnston (2/2) 10', 76'

Toyota Stadium
Attendance: 3,368
Referee: Marius Mitrea (FIR)

=== Round 9 ===
23 November 2018
19:35

(1 BP) Glasgow Warriors (Scotland)	40–15	(Wales) Cardiff Blues
Try: Ashe 10' c Matawalu (2) 16' c, 67' c Gibbins 29' c Seymour 36' c Hughes 53' m Con: P. Horne (5/6) 11', 17', 30', 37', 67'	Report	Try: Dacey 43' m Evans 59' c Con: Evans (1/2) 60'; Pen: Evans (1/1) 4'

Scotstoun Stadium
Attendance: 7,351
Referee: John Lacey (IRFU)

23 November 2018
19:35

(1 BP) Leinster (Ireland)	52–7	(Wales) Ospreys
Try: O'Brien 11' c Penny 31' c McCarthy 37' c Fardy 44' c E. Byrne 56' c Deegan 62' c A. Byrne 72' c Con: Frawley (7/7) 12', 32', 39', 44', 57', 64', 73'; Pen: Frawley (1/1) 24'	Report	Try: Dirksen 78' c Con: S. Davies (1/1) 79'

RDS Arena
Attendance: 12,973
Referee: Marius Mitrea (FIR)

23 November 2018
19:35

(1 BP) Scarlets (Wales)	29–12	(Ireland) Ulster
Try: Kruger 25' c Hardy 36' c Fonotia 39' m Prydie 60' c Con: D. Jones (3/4) 26', 36', 62'; Pen: D. Jones (1/1) 18'	Report	Try: Shanahan 14' c Stewart 62' m Con: Burns (1/2) 15'

Parc y Scarlets
Attendance: 7,788
Referee: Quinton Immelman (SARU)

24 November 2018
14:30

(1 BP) Cheetahs (South Africa)	31–25	(Italy) Benetton (1 BP)
Try: Lee 7' c Venter 44' c Maartens (2) 58' c, 72' c Con: Schoeman (3/3) 8', 45', 59'; Fouche (1/1) 73'; Pen: Fouche (1/1) 76'	Report	Try: Zanon 3' m Duvenage 28' c McKinley 68' c Con: McKinley (2/3) 29', 70'; Pen: McKinley (2/2) 14', 48'

Toyota Stadium
Attendance: 2,846
Referee: Craig Evans (WRU)

25 November 2018
15:00

Southern Kings (South Africa)	14–31	(Ireland) Connacht (1 BP)
Try: Banda 27' c Dukisa 50' c Con: Banda (2/2)	Report	Try: Kelleher 10' c Penalty try 35'; Healy 39' c Boyle 61' c Con: Carty (2/2) 11', 40'; Horwitz 61'; Pen: Carty (1/1) 4'

NMU Stadium
Attendance: 3,207
Referee: George Clancy (IRFU)

25 November 2018
16:30

Zebre (Italy)	7–32	(Ireland) Munster (1 BP)
Try: Giammarioli 63' c Con: Brummer (1/1) 64'	Report	Try: F. Wycherley 15' c O'Byrne 29' c R. O'Mahony 72' c R. Scannell 78' m Con: Johnston (2/2) 16', 31'; R. Scannell (1/2) 74'; Pen: Johnston (1/1) 40'; R. Scannell (1/1) 69'

Stadio Sergio Lanfranchi
Attendance: 2,400
Referee: Sam Grove-White (SRU)

25 November 2018
17:30

Dragons (Wales)	18–12	(Scotland) Edinburgh (1 BP)
Try: Rosser (2) 23' c, 53' m Con: Tovey (1/2) 25'; Pen: Tovey (2/2) 9', 64'	Report	Try: Fife 40' m Graham 66' c Con: van der Walt (1/1) 67'

Rodney Parade
Attendance: 4,152
Referee: Stuart Berry (SARU)

=== Round 10 ===
30 November 2018
19:35

(1 BP) Munster (Ireland)	44–14	(Scotland) Edinburgh
Try: Farrell (2) 4' m, 77' m Conway (2) 14' c, 18' c Earls (3) 29' m, 33' m, 37' m Bleyendaal 63' m Con: Hanrahan (2/8) 15', 19'	Report	Try: Van der Merwe (2) 20' c, 68' c Con: van der Walt (1/1) 21'; Baggott (1/1) 69'

Irish Independent Park
Attendance: 8,008
Referee: Nigel Owens (WRU)

30 November 2018
19:35

(1 BP) Ospreys (Wales)	43–0	(Italy) Zebre
Try: Penalty try 23'; L. Morgan (3) 32' m, 56' c, 68' c Otten 77' c Cracknell 80' c Con: S. Davies (2/3) 57' m, 69' c Hook (2/2) 78', 80'; Pen: S. Davies (1/1) 37'	Report

Liberty Stadium
Attendance: 5,988
Referee: Cwengile Jadezweni (SARU)

1 December 2018
15:00

Ulster (Ireland)	16–12	(Wales) Cardiff Blues (1 BP)
Try: Treadwell 13' c Con: Cooney (1/1) 13'; Pen: Cooney (3/3) 2', 57', 66'	Report	Try: Morgan 9' m Dacey 19' c Con: Evans (1/2) 20'

Kingspan Stadium
Attendance: 13,407
Referee: Stuart Berry (SARU)

1 December 2018
17:00

(1 BP) Cheetahs (South Africa)	17–21	(Ireland) Connacht
Try: Jaer 30' m Dweba 35' m S. Venter 71' c Con: Schoeman (1/1) 72'	Report	Try: Farrell 5' c Thornbury 27' m Con: J. Carty (1/2) 7'; Pen: J. Carty (1/1) 21'; Horwitz (2/2) 57', 64'

Toyota Stadium
Attendance: 3,270
Referee: Dan Jones (WRU)

1 December 2018
17:15

Dragons (Wales)	10–59	(Ireland) Leinster (1 BP)
Try: R. Williams 45' c Con: Tovey (1/1) 46'; Pen: Tovey (1/1) 18'	Report	Try: D. Kearney (2) 6' c, 42' c Penny 12' c Fardy 22' m Doris 53' c Keenan 61' c B. Byrne 64' m J. O'Brien (2) 68' c, 78' c Con: R. Byrne (5/7) 7', 13', 43', 54', 61'; Frawley (2/2) 69', 80'

Rodney Parade
Attendance: 4,503
Referee: Lloyd Linton (SRU)

1 December 2018
17:15

Glasgow Warriors (Scotland)	29–20	(Wales) Scarlets
Try: Thomson 29' c Grigg 41' c Con: Thomson (2/2) 30', 42'; Pen: Thomson (5/7) 12', 21', 50', 59', 78'	Report	Try: Jo. Davies 46' m St. Evans 68' m Blommetjies 74' c Con: Patchell (1/3) 76'; Pen: Patchell (1/1) 6'

Scotstoun Stadium
Attendance: 7,351
Referee: Frank Murphy (IRFU)

1 December 2018
19:15

(1 BP) Southern Kings (South Africa)	19–22	(Italy) Benetton (1 BP)
Try: Kruger (2) 10' c, 80' m Pupuma 74' c Con: Banda (2/3) 11', 74'	Report	Try: Faiva (3) 5' m, 25' c, 37' m Ioane 50' m Con: McKinley (1/4) 27'

NMU Stadium
Attendance: 1,459
Referee: Sean Gallagher (IRFU)

=== Round 11 ===
21 December 2018
19:35

Cardiff Blues (Wales)	19–16	(Wales) Dragons (1 BP)
Try: Fish 52' c Con: Anscombe (1/1) 54'; Pen: Anscombe (4/5) 19', 49', 63', 80'	Report	Try: Sage 72'; Con: Tovey (1/1) 74'; Pen: Lewis (2/2) 38', 58'; Drop: Lewis (1/1) 34'

Cardiff Arms Park
Attendance: 8,164
Referee: Frank Murphy (IRFU)

21 December 2018
19:35

Ulster (Ireland)	19–12	(Ireland) Munster (1 BP)
Try: Herring 32' c Baloucoune 60' c Shanahan 76' m Con: Burns (2/3) 34', 61'	Report	Pen: Hanrahan (2/2) 11', 51'; Johnston (2/2) 65', 80'

Kingspan Stadium
Attendance: 16,804
Referee: Sean Gallagher (IRFU)

22 December 2018
15:00

Ospreys (Wales)	19–12	(Wales) Scarlets (1 BP)
Try: Morgan 57' c Con: S. Davies (1/1) 58'; Pen: S. Davies (2/3) 7', 14'; Drop: S. Davies (2/2) 60', 65'	Report	Pen: Patchell (3/4) 5', 10', 26'; D. Jones (1/1) 71'

Liberty Stadium
Attendance: 13,251
Referee: Ben Whitehouse (WRU)

22 December 2018
19:45

(1 BP) Leinster (Ireland)	33–29	(Ireland) Connacht (2 BP)
Try: O'Brien 11' c M. Kearney 43' m Cronin 69' c Leavy 71' c Porter 80' c Con: Byrne (4/5) 11', 69', 72', 80'	Report	Try: Kelleher 5' m Leader 22' c J. Carty 33' c Blade 47' c Con: J. Carty (3/4) 23', 34', 48'; Pen: J. Carty (1/1) 63'

RDS Arena
Attendance: 16,790
Referee: George Clancy (IRFU)

22 December 2018
15:00

(1 BP) Zebre (Italy)	8–10	(Italy) Benetton
Try: Elliott 53' m Pen: Canna (1/3) 36'	Report	Try: Tavuyara 30' c Con: McKinley (1/1) 32'; Pen: McKinley (1/1) 42'

Stadio Sergio Lanfranchi
Attendance: 4,600
Referee: Marius Mitrea (FIR)

==== 1872 Cup 1st round ====
22 December 2018
17:15

Edinburgh (Scotland)	23–7	(Scotland) Glasgow Warriors
Try: Van der Merwe (2) 11' c, 59' c Con: Van der Walt (2/2) 13', 61'; Pen: Van der Walt (3/3) 9', 21', 54'	Report	Try: P. Horne 36' c Con: Hastings (1/1) 37'

Murrayfield Stadium
Attendance: 21,190
Referee: Mike Adamson (SRU)

=== Round 12 ===
28 December 2018
19:35

Connacht (Ireland)	21–12	(Ireland) Ulster
Try: Delahunt 12' c Aki 19' c Blade 42' c Con: J. Carty (3/3) 13', 21', 44'	Report	Try: Kernohan 32' c Murphy 67' m Con: Cooney (1/2) 33'

Galway Sportsgrounds
Attendance: 8,129
Referee: Marius Mitrea (FIR)

29 December 2018
15:00

Benetton (Italy)	28–10	(Italy) Zebre
Try: Bigi 26' m Ruzza 45' c Lamaro 79' c Con: Allan (1/2) 46'; McKinley (1/1) 80'; Pen: Allan (3/3) 6', 9', 70'	Report	Try: Canna 80' c Con: Canna (1/1) 80'; Pen: Canna (1/2) 13'

Stadio Comunale di Monigo
Attendance: 4,920
Referee: Lloyd Linton (SRU)

29 December 2018
17:15

Munster (Ireland)	26–17	(Ireland) Leinster
Try: Cloete 13' c Earls 71' c Con: Carbery (1/1) 15'; Bleyendaal (1/1) 72'; Pen: Carbery (4/4)	Report	Try: Tracy 47' c Deegan 80' c Con: Sexton (1/1) 48'; Frawley 80'; Pen: Sexton (1/1) 23'

Thomond Park
Attendance: 26,267
Referee: Frank Murphy (IRFU)

29 December 2018
17:15

Scarlets (Wales)	5–34	(Wales) Cardiff Blues (1 BP)
Try: McNicholl 11' m	Report	Try: L. Williams 9' c Lee-Lo (2) 61' c, 75' c Anscombe 78' c Con: Anscombe (4/4) 11', 62', 77', 79'; Pen: Anscombe (2/2) 8', 70'

Parc y Scarlets
Attendance: 10,622
Referee: Nigel Owens (WRU)

30 December 2018
15:00

Dragons (Wales)	23–22	(Wales) Ospreys (1 BP)
Try: Rosser 27' c Dee 51' c Con: Lewis (2/2) 28', 52'; Pen: Lewis (2/2) 4', 18'; Tovey (1/1) 73'	Report	Try: Tipuric 65' c Con: S. Davies (1/1) 66'; Pen: S. Davies (5/6) 21', 31', 43', 57', 69'

Rodney Parade
Attendance: 7,196
Referee: Dan Jones (WRU)

==== 1872 Cup 2nd round ====
29 December 2018
15:00

Glasgow Warriors (Scotland)	8–16	(Scotland) Edinburgh
Try: G. Horne 77' m Pen: Hastings (1/1) 19'	Report	Try: McInally 49' c Con: van der Walt (1/1) 50'; Pen: van der Walt (3/3) 4', 25', 59'

Scotstoun Stadium
Attendance: 7,351
Referee: George Clancy (IRFU)

=== Round 13 ===
5 January 2019
15:00

Benetton (Italy)	20–17	(Scotland) Glasgow Warriors (1 BP)
Try: Budd (2) 13' c, 27' m Steyn 50' m Con: Allan (1/3) 14'; Pen: Allan (1/1) 67'	Report	Try: Johnson 22' c G. Horne 39' c Con: Hastings (2/2) 22', 40'; Pen: Hastings (1/1) 62'

Stadio Comunale di Monigo
Attendance: 3,800
Referee: Joy Neville (IRFU)

5 January 2019
15:00

Ospreys (Wales)	20–11	(Wales) Cardiff Blues
Try: S. Williams 2' c North 19' c Con: S. Davies (2/2) 3', 21'; Pen: S. Davies (1/1) 51'; Drop: S. Davies (1/1) 78'	Report	Try: Smith 5' m Pen: Anscombe (2/2) 40', 58'

Liberty Stadium
Attendance: 7,264
Referee: Ben Whitehouse (WRU)

5 January 2019
17:15

(1 BP) Leinster (Ireland)	40–7	(Ireland) Ulster
Try: Cronin (2) 5' c, 12' c C. O'Brien 19' m Porter 40' c Gibson-Park 61' c Penalty try 80'; Con: Frawley (4/5) 7', 13', 40', 62'	Report	Try: McBurney 17' c Con: McPhillips (1/1) 18'

RDS Arena
Attendance: 18,099
Referee: Andrew Brace (IRFU)

5 January 2019
17:15

Scarlets (Wales)	22–13	(Wales) Dragons
Try: Nicholas 56' m Hidalgo-Clyne 74' m Pen: D. Jones (4/4) 3', 11', 37', 40+1'	Report	Try: Benjamin 80' c Con: Tovey (1/1) 80+1'; Pen: Lewis (2/2) 31', 47'

Parc y Scarlets
Attendance: 8,167
Referee: Craig Evans (WRU)

5 January 2019
19:35

(1 BP) Connacht (Ireland)	24–31	(Ireland) Munster (1 BP)
Try: Farrell 9' c Kelleher 41' c J. Carty 72' c Con: J. Carty (3/3) 11', 42', 72'; Pen: J. Carty (1/1) 40'	Report	Try: P. O'Mahony 16' c Goggin (2) 24' c, 48' c Carbery 63' c Con: Carbery (4/4) 17', 25', 49', 64'; Pen: Carbery (1/1) 56'

Galway Sportsgrounds
Attendance: 8,129
Referee: Mike Adamson (SRU)

5 January 2019
19:35

(1 BP) Edinburgh (Scotland)	38–0	(South Africa) Southern Kings
Try: Fife 3' c Graham (2) 6' c, 10' m Sutherland 40+3' c Berghan 45' m Fenton 62' c Con: Hickey (4/6) 4', 7', 40+4', 64'	Report

Murrayfield Stadium
Attendance: 4,549
Referee: John Lacey (IRFU)

6 January 2019
13:00

Zebre (Italy)	12–27	(South Africa) Cheetahs (1 BP)
Try: Padovani 28' m Bisengi 31' c Con: Canna (1/2) 32'	Report	Try: Janse van Rensburg (2) 18' c, 42' m Maxwane 22' m Venter 74' m Maartens 78' m Con: Schoeman (1/5) 20'

Stadio Sergio Lanfranchi
Attendance: 1,700
Referee: Dan Jones (WRU)

=== Round 11 Catch up ===
18 January 2019
19:00

(1 BP) Southern Kings (South Africa)	17–24	(South Africa) Cheetahs
Try: Dukisa 42' c Penalty try 72'; Con: Banda (1/1) 42'; Pen: Banda (1/1) 48'	Report	Try: Maxwane 6' c Junior Pokomela 45' c de Bruin 80+5' c Con: Schoeman (2/2) 8', 46'; Fouché (1/1) 80+6'; Pen: van Rensburg (1/1) 63'

NMU Stadium
Attendance: 3,872
Referee: Quinton Immelman (SARU)

=== Round 14 ===
25 January 2019
19:35

Glasgow Warriors (Scotland)	9–3	(Wales) Ospreys (1 BP)
Pen: Thomson (3/3) 42', 60', 62'	Report	Pen: S. Davies (1/3) 31'

Scotstoun Stadium
Attendance: 7,246
Referee: John Lacey (IRFU)

25 January 2019
19:35

Leinster (Ireland)	22–17	(Wales) Scarlets (1 BP)
Try: O'Loughlin 40+1' c Lowe 68' m B. Daly 71' c Con: Frawley (2/3) 40+2', 73'; Pen: Frawley (1/1) 30'	Report	Try: Hardy (2) 51' c, 73' c Con: D. Jones (2/2) 52', 74'; Pen: D. Jones (1/2) 59'

RDS Arena
Attendance: 15,007
Referee: Marius Mitrea (FIR)

25 January 2019
19:35

Ulster (Ireland)	17–17	(Italy) Benetton
Try: Ludik 0' m Herring 44' m Penalty try	Report	Try: Ruzza 10' c Ratuva Tavuyara 59' c Con: McKinley (2/2) 11', 59'; Pen: McKinley (1/1) 38'

Kingspan Stadium
Attendance: 13,264
Referee: Nigel Owens (WRU)

26 January 2019
15:00

(1 BP) Cheetahs (South Africa)	61–28	(Italy) Zebre (1 BP)
Try: Maxwane 1' m Jaer 13' c Manjezi 19' c Nonkontwana 30' c Nché 46' c S. Venter (2) 61' c, 76' c Pokomela 64' c Janse van Rensburg 79' c Con: Schoeman (8/9) 14', 19', 32', 47', 62', 66', 78', 80'	Report	Try: Balekana 5' c Meyer 50' c Tauyavuca 53' c Biagi 71' c Con: Canna (4/4) 6', 50', 53', 71'

Toyota Stadium
Attendance: 6,360
Referee: Ben Whitehouse (WRU)

26 January 2019
15:00

(1 BP) Dragons (Wales)	7–8	(Ireland) Munster
Try: Fairbrother 13' c Con: Lewis (1/1) 14'	Report	Try: Kleyn 62' m Pen: Johnston (1/1) 29'

Rodney Parade
Attendance: 5,013
Referee: Ben Blain (SRU)

26 January 2019
17:15

Cardiff Blues (Wales)	8–7	(Ireland) Connacht (1 BP)
Try: Lane 24' m Pen: Shingler (1/2) 11'	Report	Try: Boyle 74' c Con: C. Fitzgerald 75'

Cardiff Arms Park
Attendance: 5,673
Referee: Mike Adamson (SRU)

26 January 2019
17:15

Southern Kings (South Africa)	25–21	(Scotland) Edinburgh (1 BP)
Try: Basson 3' c B. Pretorius 75' c Penxe 77' m Con: Banda (2/3) 5', 76'; Pen: Banda (2/2) 10', 37'	Report	Try: Dean 7' c Penalty try 61'; Ford 71'; Con: van der Walt (2/2) 8', 73'

NMU Stadium
Attendance: 3,477
Referee: Dan Jones (WRU)

=== Round 12 Catch up ===
2 February 2019
16:00

(1 BP) Cheetahs (South Africa)	40–36	(South Africa) Southern Kings (2 BP)
Try: S. Venter ' c Schoeman 14' c Small-Smith 22' m Jaer 54' c Pokomela 62' c R. Venter 65' c Con: Schoeman (5/6) 7', 15', 56', 63', 66'	Report	Try: Velleman 33' c Penxe 46' m Burger 72' c A. van Rooyen 75' c B. Klaasen 80+2' c Con: Banda (4/5) 34', 73', 76', 80+3'; Pen: Banda (1/1) 2'

Toyota Stadium
Attendance: 6,500
Referee: Stuart Berry (SARU)

=== Round 15 ===
15 February 2019
19:35

(1 BP) Edinburgh (Scotland)	34–17	(Wales) Dragons
	Report

Murrayfield Stadium
Attendance: 4,584
Referee: Andrew Brace (IRFU)

15 February 2019
19:35

(1 BP) Munster (Ireland)	43–0	(South Africa) Southern Kings
Try: N. Cronin 13' c Conway 37' m Sweetnam 54' c Holland 60' m Marshall 66' c Kleyn 70' m R. Scannell 79' c Con: R. Scannell (4/7) 14', 55', 67', 80'	Report

Irish Independent Park
Attendance: 8,008
Referee: Andrea Piardi (FIR)

15 February 2019
19:35

Ospreys (Wales)	0–8	(Ireland) Ulster
	Report; Highlights	Try: McCloskey 46'; Pen: Cooney 80'

Liberty Stadium
Attendance: 4,264
Referee: Quinton Immelman (SARU)

16 February 2019
16:00

(1 BP) Zebre (Italy)	24–40	(Ireland) Leinster (1 BP)
	Report

Stadio Luigi Zaffanella
Attendance: 3,300
Referee: Ian Davies (WRU)

16 February 2019
18:15

Benetton (Italy)	25–19	(Wales) Scarlets (1 BP)
	Report

Stadio Comunale di Monigo
Attendance: 3,100
Referee: Frank Murphy (IRFU)

16 February 2019
17:30

Connacht (Ireland)	25–17	(South Africa) Cheetahs
Try: Farrell 24' c McCartney 45' c Butler 78' m Con: J. Carty (2/3) 26', 47'; Pen: J. Carty (2/2) 16', 72'	Report	Try: Maxwane 10' c Fouché 20' m S. Venter 59' m Con: Schoeman (1/3) 12'

Galway Sportsgrounds
Attendance: 4,933
Referee: Nigel Owens (WRU)

16 February 2019
19:35

(2 BP) Cardiff Blues (Wales)	34–38	(Scotland) Glasgow Warriors (1 BP)
	Report

Cardiff Arms Park
Attendance: 5,907
Referee: George Clancy (IRFU)

=== Round 16 ===
22 February 2019
19:35

(1 BP) Glasgow Warriors (Scotland)	43–17	(Ireland) Connacht
Try: G. Horne 0' c Swinson 30' c Stewart (2) 38' c, 44' c Nairn (2) 66' c, 72' m Con: Thomson (5/6) 1', 31', 38', 45', 67'; Pen: Thomson (1/1) 16'	Report	Try: S. Fitzgerald 21' m Boyle 61' m Daly 69' c Con: Godwin (1/2) 70'

Scotstoun Stadium
Attendance: 7,246
Referee: Ben Whitehouse (WRU)

22 February 2019
19:35

(1 BP) Ospreys (Wales)	13–19	(Ireland) Munster
Try: Dirksen 18' c Con: Price (1/1) 18'; Pen: Price (2/2) 32', 62'	Report	Try: Sweetnam 4' c Penalty try 36'; Haley 69' m Con: Hanrahan (1/2) 5'

Liberty Stadium
Attendance: 5,432
Referee: Stuart Berry (SARU)

22 February 2019
19:55

(1 BP) Leinster (Ireland)	59–19	(South Africa) Southern Kings
	Report

RDS Arena
Attendance: 10,435
Referee: Sam Grove-White (SRU)

23 February 2019
14:00

(1 BP) Benetton (Italy)	57–7	(Wales) Dragons
	Report

Stadio Comunale di Monigo
Attendance: 2,800
Referee: Quinton Immelman (SARU)

23 February 2019
19:35

(1 BP) Edinburgh (Scotland)	17–19	(Wales) Cardiff Blues
	Report

Murrayfield Stadium
Attendance: 4,258
Referee: Frank Murphy (IRFU)

23 February 2019
19:35

(1 BP) Ulster (Ireland)	54–7	(Italy) Zebre
Try: Herring (3) 15' 19' c 30' c Lyttle 39' c Ludik 49' c Baloucoune 58' c Nelson 72' c Con: Lyttle (6) 12' 32, 40' 51, 60' 73'	Report; Highlights	Try: Penalty try 24'

Kingspan Stadium
Attendance: 12,842
Referee: Mike Adamson (SRU)

24 February 2019
13:00

(1 BP) Scarlets (Wales)	43–21	(South Africa) Cheetahs
	Report

Parc y Scarlets
Attendance: 7,200
Referee: John Lacey (IRFU)

=== Round 17 ===
1 March 2019
19:35

Leinster (Ireland)	19–7	(South Africa) Cheetahs
	Report

RDS Arena
Attendance: 10,057
Referee: Nigel Owens (WRU)

2 March 2019
14:45

(1 BP) Connacht (Ireland)	46–5	(Wales) Ospreys
Try: Farrell 1' c Healy 24' c Marmion (2) 29' c, 50' c McCartney 69' c Con: Godwin (4/4) 1', 25', 31', 52'; Pen: Godwin (2/2) 12', 15'	Report	Try: Aubrey 15' m

Galway Sportsgrounds
Attendance: 5,117
Referee: Marius Mitrea (FIR)

2 March 2019
16:00

Benetton (Italy)	18–10	(Scotland) Edinburgh
	Report

Stadio Comunale di Monigo
Attendance: 4,600
Referee: George Clancy (IRFU)

2 March 2019
17:00

Scarlets (Wales)	10–6	(Ireland) Munster (1 BP)
Try: Nicholas 10' c Con: Halfpenny (1/1) 12'; Pen: Halfpenny (1/1) 48'	Report	Pen: Johnston (2/2) 4', 39'

Parc y Scarlets
Attendance: 8,032
Referee: Mike Adamson (SRU)

2 March 2019
18:15

Zebre (Italy)	10–42	(Scotland) Glasgow Warriors (1 BP)
	Report

Stadio Sergio Lanfranchi
Attendance: 2,500
Referee: Andrew Brace (IRFU)

2 March 2019
19:35

(1 BP) Cardiff Blues (Wales)	26–19	(South Africa) Southern Kings (1 BP)
	Report

Cardiff Arms Park
Attendance: 5,312
Referee: Joy Neville (IRFU)

3 March 2019
15:00

Dragons (Wales)	15–28	(Ireland) Ulster (1 BP)
Try: Basham 76'; Pen: Lewis 16'	Report; Highlights	Try: Murphy 24' c Moore 44' c Cooney 48' c O'Connor 73' c Con: Cooney (3) 25' 45' 49'; Burns

Rodney Parade
Attendance: 5,142
Referee: Stuart Berry (SARU)

=== Round 18 ===
22 March 2019
19:35

(1 BP) Cardiff Blues (Wales)	41–17	(Wales) Scarlets
	Report

Cardiff Arms Park
Attendance: 12,000
Referee: John Lacey (IRFU)

22 March 2019
19:35

(1 BP) Connacht (Ireland)	29–14	(Italy) Benetton
Try: Blade ' c Healy (2) 29' c, 68' m J. Carty ' c Con: Godwin (2/2) 17', 30'; J. Carty (1/2) 80'; Pen: J. Carty (1/1) 63'	Report	Try: Rizzi 37' c Duvenage 55' c Con: Rizzi (2/2) 38', 56'

Galway Sportsgrounds
Attendance: 5,106
Referee: Mike Adamson (SRU)

22 March 2019
19:35

(1 BP) Edinburgh (Scotland)	28–11	(Ireland) Leinster
	Report

Murrayfield Stadium
Attendance: 6,661
Referee: Ben Whitehouse (WRU)

23 March 2019
15:00

(1 BP) Ospreys (Wales)	29–20	(Wales) Dragons
	Report

Liberty Stadium
Attendance: 8,047
Referee: Nigel Owens (WRU)

23 March 2019
17:30

(1 BP) Ulster (Ireland)	33–19	(South Africa) Southern Kings
Try: McCloskey 7' c Lyttle 14' c Coetzee 35' c Baloucoune 47' c Andrew 75'; Con: Burns (3) 9' 16' 36'; Cooney 49'	Report; Highlights	Try: Penxe 21'; Beyers 26' c Willemse 63 ' c Con: Pretorius (2) 27' 64'

Kingspan Stadium
Attendance: 13,748
Referee: Lloyd Linton (SRU)

23 March 2019
19:45

(1 BP) Glasgow Warriors (Scotland)	35–17	(South Africa) Cheetahs
	Report

Scotstoun Stadium
Attendance: 7,246
Referee: George Clancy (IRFU)

23 March 2019
19:45

(1 BP) Munster (Ireland)	31–12	(Italy) Zebre
Try: Loughman 40'+1 m Marshall 52' c Sweetnam 64' m N. Scannell 68' c Haley 77' c Con: Bleyendaal (3/4) 53', 69', 79'	Report	Try: Elliott 8' m Tenga 18' c Con: Canna (1/2) 18'

Thomond Park
Attendance: 14,226
Referee: Dan Jones (WRU)

=== Round 19 ===
5 April 2019
19:35

(1 BP) Glasgow Warriors (Scotland)	30–7	(Ireland) Ulster
Try: Brown 13' c Hastings 18' m Seymour 40' m Z. Fagerson 43' c Con: Hastings (2/4) 14', 44'; Pen: Hastings (2/2) 26', 57'	Report	Try: Herring 7' c Con: Cooney (1/1) 8' c

Scotstoun Stadium
Attendance: 7,351
Referee: Stuart Berry (SARU)

5 April 2019
19:35

(1 BP) Munster (Ireland)	45–21	(Wales) Cardiff Blues
Try: Farrell 17' c Kleyn 29' c Stander 49' c Murray 60' c Conway 65' c Arnold 75' c Con: Bleyendaal (5/5) 17', 30', 50', 60', 66'; Hanrahan (1/1) 77'; Pen: Bleyendaal (1/2) 11'	Report	Try: T. Williams 6' c Summerhill 37' c Lee-Lo 45' c Con: Anscombe (3/3) 7', 39', 47'

Irish Independent Park
Attendance: 8,008
Referee: Marius Mitrea (FIR)

6 April 2019
16:30

Cheetahs (South Africa)	14–31	(Wales) Ospreys (1 BP)
Try: Swanepoel 41' c R. Venter 71'c Con: Schoeman (2/2) 42' 72'	Report	Try: D. Evans 25' c Cracknell 29' c Tipuric 43' c Allen 54' c Con: Price (2/2) 26', 30'; S. Davies (2/2) 44', 55'; Pen: S. Davies (1/1) 67'

Toyota Stadium
Attendance: 4,638
Referee: John Lacey (IRFU)

6 April 2019
17:30

(1 BP) Zebre (Italy)	5–6	(Ireland) Connacht
Try: Bellini 41'm	Report	Pen: J. Carty (2/2) 5', 21'

Stadio Sergio Lanfranchi
Attendance: 3,500
Referee: Ben Blain (SRU)

6 April 2019
18:45

Scarlets (Wales)	12–20	(Scotland) Edinburgh
Try: G. Davies 10' c St. Evans 24' m Con: Halfpenny (1/2) 11'	Report	Try: M. Scott 59' c van der Walt 64' c Con: van der Walt (2/2) 60', 65'; Pen: van der Walt (2/3) 44', 68'

Parc y Scarlets
Attendance: 8,733
Referee: George Clancy (IRFU)

6 April 2019
19:45

Leinster (Ireland)	27–27	(Italy) Benetton
Try: Lowe 47' c B. Byrne 63' c Frawley 70' c Con: Frawley (3/3) 48', 64' 71'; Pen: Reid (1/1) 17'; Frawley (1/1) 25'	Report	Try: Bigi 12' c Ruzza 53' c Ratuva Tavuyara 80' c Con: Allan (3/3) 14', 54', 80+3'; Pen: Allan (2/2) 20', 39'

RDS Arena
Attendance: 12,627
Referee: Nigel Owens (WRU)

7 April 2019
15:00

Southern Kings (South Africa)	18–18	(Wales) Dragons
Try: Ungerer 16' m Basson 18' m H. Klaasen 51' m Pen: B. Pretorius (1/1) 32'	Report	Try: Warren 2' m J. Williams 56' c Con: Lewis (1/2) 56'; Pen: Lewis (2/2) 10', 78'

Nelson Mandela Bay Stadium
Attendance: 2,497
Referee: Frank Murphy (IRFU)

=== Round 20 ===
12 April 2019
18:00

Benetton (Italy)	28–37	(Ireland) Munster (1 BP)
Try: Benvenuti 7' c Ioane 37' m Penalty try 44'; Con: Allan (1/2) 8'; Pen: Allan (3/3) 5', 18', 23'	Report	Try: Marshall 10' c Goggin 13' c S. Daly 60' c Mathewson 67' c Con: Hanrahan (4/4) 11', 13', 61', 68'; Pen: Hanrahan (3/3) 25', 48', 54'

Stadio Comunale di Monigo
Attendance: 5,000
Referee: Ben Whitehouse (WRU)

12 April 2019
19:35

Edinburgh (Scotland)	7–29	(Ireland) Ulster (1 BP)
Try: Barclay 57' c Con: Hickey (1/1) 59'	Report	Try: Murphy 11' c Baloucoune 40' m Lyttle 53' c Burns 77' c Con: Cooney (3/4) 12', 55', 79'; Pen: Cooney (1/1) 4'

Murrayfield Stadium
Attendance: 7,856
Referee: Nigel Owens (WRU)

12 April 2019
19:35

Southern Kings (South Africa)	7–43	(Wales) Ospreys (1 BP)
Try: Mike Willemse 61' c Con: Banda (1/1) 62'	Report	Try: D. Evans (3) 13' c, 17' c, 56' m Allen 19' m Dirksen 25' c B. Davies (2) 29' c, 78' m Con: Price (4/5) 14', 18', 25', 30'

Nelson Mandela Bay Stadium
Attendance: 1,792
Referee: Andrew Brace (IRFU)

13 April 2019
15:00

(1 BP) Connacht (Ireland)	29–22	(Wales) Cardiff Blues (1 BP)
Try: Blade 11' c Thornbury 26' c J. Carty 49' c Healy 72' m Con: J. Carty (3/4) 11', 27', 50'; Pen: J. Carty (1/3) 46'	Report	Try: Lane 19' c Turnbull 70' c Harries 79' m Con: Anscombe (2/3) 20', 71'; Pen: Anscombe (1/1) 52'

Galway Sportsgrounds
Attendance: 6,229
Referee: Mike Adamson (SRU)

13 April 2019
15:00

(1 BP) Leinster (Ireland)	24–39	(Scotland) Glasgow Warriors (1 BP)
Try: D. Kearney (2) 9' m, 60' m R. Kearney (2) 35' c, 51' c Con: R. Byrne (2/3) 36', 53'	Report	Try: Johnson 15' c Seymour 39' m M. Fagerson 64' c Z. Fagerson 72' c G. Horne 80+2' c Con: Hastings (4/5) 15', 66', 73', 80+3'; Pen: Hastings (2/2) 4', 14'

RDS Arena
Attendance: 14,368
Referee: Marius Mitrea (FIR)

13 April 2019
17:15

(1 BP) Scarlets (Wales)	42–0	(Italy) Zebre
Try: Cassiem (2) 12' c, 72' c Parkes 35' c McNicholl 59' c Hardy 74' c Nicholas 76' c Con: Halfpenny (6/6) 13', 36', 60', 72', 75', 76'	Report

Parc y Scarlets
Attendance: 8,356
Referee: Keith Allen (SRU)

13 April 2019
18:35

(1 BP) Cheetahs (South Africa)	38–13	(Wales) Dragons
Try: H. Venter 39' c S. Venter 62' c Schoeman 73' c Fouché 77' c Maxwane 79' c Con: Schoeman (5/5) 40', 63', 74', 78', 80'; Pen: Schoeman (1/1) 4'	Report	Try: Basham 43' c Con: Lewis (1/1) 44'; Pen: Lewis (2/3) 29', 58'

Toyota Stadium
Attendance: 4,108
Referee: Sean Gallagher (IRFU)

=== Round 21 ===
27 April 2019
15:00

Zebre (Italy)	11–25	(Italy) Benetton (1 BP)
Try: Bellini 77' m Pen: Azzolini (2/2) 9', 29'	Report	Try: Morisi 20' c Halafihi 39' m Negri 60' m Ioane 68' m Con: Allan (1/4) 21'; Pen: Allan (1/1) 53'

Stadio Sergio Lanfranchi
Attendance: 4,450
Referee: Andrew Brace (IRFU)

27 April 2019
17:15

Ulster (Ireland)	14–13	(Ireland) Leinster (1 BP)
Try: Shanahan 31' c Rea 60' c Con: McPhillips 33'; Nelson 61'	Report; Highlights	Try: O'Brien 29'; McFadden 40'+3; Pen: Ross Byrne 39'

Kingspan Stadium
Attendance: 17,358
Referee: George Clancy (IRFU)

27 April 2019
16:30

(1 BP) Cheetahs (South Africa)	61–25	(South Africa) Southern Kings
Try: Nonkontwana 8' c Steenkamp 17' c Dweba 28' c S. Venter (2) 39' c, 63' c Fouche 41' m Janse van Rensburg 55' c Jaer 70' c B. Venter 80' c Con: Schoeman (8/9) 10', 18', 30', 40', 56', 64', 71', 80'	Report	Try: Klaasen (2) 34', 46'; Basson 50' m Con: Banda (2/3) 35', 46'; Pen: Banda (2/2) 3', 13'

Toyota Stadium
Attendance: 4,698
Referee: Dan Jones (WRU)

27 April 2019
19:35

Munster (Ireland)	27–14	(Ireland) Connacht
Try: Beirne 30' c Haley 36' c Hanrahan 74' c Con: Bleyendaal (2/2) 31', 37'; Hanrahan (1/1) 75'; Pen: Bleyendaal (2/2) 20', 56'	Report	Try: Bealham 23'; McKeon 70' c Con: Dean (2/2) 24', 70'

Thomond Park
Attendance: 19,999
Referee: Frank Murphy (IRFU)

==== Judgement Day ====
27 April 2019
15:00

(1 BP) Dragons (Wales)	34–32	(Wales) Scarlets (2 BP)
Try: Screech (2) 47' c, 78' c Dixon 52' c Lewis 55' c Con: Lewis (3/3) 48', 54', 56'; Tovey (1/1) 78'; Pen: Lewis (2/2) 3', 14'	Report	Try: Nicholas 18' c McNicholl (2) 25' m, 63' c G. Davies 29' m Jo. Davies 60' m Con: Halfpenny (2/5) 19', 65'; Pen: Halfpenny (1/1) 72'; Drop: Patchell (0/1)

Millennium Stadium
Attendance: 51,297
Referee: Ben Whitehouse (WRU)

27 April 2019
17:15

(1 BP) Cardiff Blues (Wales)	23–26	(Wales) Ospreys
Try: Anscombe 5' c Turnbull 47' c Con: Anscombe (2/2) 6', 48'; Pen: Anscombe (3/3) 13', 36', 68'	Report	Try: Allen 29' c Smith 44' c Con: S. Davies (2/2) 30', 44'; Pen: S. Davies (4/4) 3', 22', 39', 79'; Drop: S. Davies (0/1)

Millennium Stadium
Attendance: 51,297
Referee: Nigel Owens (WRU)

==== 1872 Cup 3rd round ====
27 April 2019
19:35

(1 BP) Glasgow Warriors (Scotland)	34–10	(Scotland) Edinburgh
Try: Johnson 7' c Price 18' c Matawalu 58' c Seymour 74' c Con: Hastings (4/4) 8', 19', 60', 75'; Pen: Hastings (2/2) 2', 29'	Report	Try: Van der Merwe 78' c Con: Hickey (1/1) 79'; Pen: Hickey (1/1) 12'

Scotstoun Stadium
Attendance: 10,000
Referee: Mike Adamson (SRU)

== Play-offs ==
The top side from each of the two conferences are given a bye to the semi-finals and have home advantage. Teams placed second and third in opposite conferences meet in the two quarter-finals to determine the other two semi-finalists with the teams ranked second having home advantage.

The play-offs are scheduled in the four weeks after the regular season has been completed.

Quarter-finals
(Ireland) Ulster (B2)	21
(Ireland) Connacht (A3)	13
(Ireland) Munster (A2)	15
(Italy) Benetton (B3)	13

Semi-finals
(Scotland) Glasgow Warriors (A1)	50
(Ireland) Ulster (B2)	20
(Ireland) Leinster (B1)	24
(Ireland) Munster (A2)	9

Pro14 Final
(Scotland) Glasgow Warriors (A1)	15
(Ireland) Leinster (B1)	18

=== Quarter-finals ===
4 May 2019
15:00

Munster (Ireland)	15–13	(Italy) Benetton
Pen: Bleyendaal (2/2) 22', 43'; Hanrahan (3/3) 62', 65', 76'	Report	Try: Ratuva Tavuyara 39' c Con: Allan (1/1) 40'; Pen: Allan (2/2) 25', 59'

Thomond Park
Attendance: 10,042
Referee: Nigel Owens (WRU)

4 May 2019
17:35

Ulster (Ireland)	21–13	(Ireland) Connacht
Try: Timoney 14' m Coetzee 77' c Con: Burns (1/1) 78'; Pen: Cooney (3/3) 4', 40', 61'	Report	Try: Aki 54' c Con: J. Carty (1/1) 55'; Pen: J. Carty (2/3) 29', 67'

Kingspan Stadium
Attendance: 15,215
Referee: Andrew Brace (IRFU)

=== Semi-finals ===
17 May 2019
19:35

Glasgow Warriors (Scotland)	50–20	(Ireland) Ulster
Try: Seymour (2) 2' c, 54' m Price 16' c Harley 38' c Steyn 58' c P. Horne 67' c G. Horne 75' c Con: Hastings (6/7) 3', 18', 39', 58', 68', 76'; Pen: Hastings (1/1) 28'	Report	Try: Coetzee 60' m Herring 71' c Lowry 79' m Con: Burns (1/3) 71'; Pen: Cooney (1/1) 30'

Scotstoun Stadium
Attendance: 10,000
Referee: John Lacey (IRFU)

18 May 2019
14:30

Leinster (Ireland)	24–9	(Ireland) Munster
	Report

RDS Arena
Attendance: 18,977
Referee: Mike Adamson (SRU)

=== Final ===
25 May 2019
18:30

Glasgow Warriors (Scotland)	15–18	(Ireland) Leinster
	Report

Celtic Park
Attendance: 47,125
Referee: Nigel Owens

== Play-off for the 7th Champions Cup place ==
South African teams cannot compete in the European Rugby Champions Cup as it is restricted to European teams. The top three eligible teams in the two conferences automatically qualify for the following year's Champions Cup. The seventh Champions Cup place is allocated to the winners of the playoff match between the fourth ranked eligible teams in each conference played at the home of the team with the most regular league points.

As Leinster lost the Champions Cup final on 11 May 2019, Ospreys hosted Scarlets in the play-off on 18 May 2019.

18 May 2019
19:45

Ospreys (Wales)	21–10	(Wales) Scarlets
Try: North 8' c Cracknell 17' c Dirksen 70' c Con: S. Davies (2/2) 9', 18'; Price (1/1) 71'	Report	Try: Jo. Davies 34' c Con: Halfpenny (1/1) 35'; Pen: Halfpenny (1/1) 13'

Liberty Stadium
Attendance: 8,489
Referee: Ben Whitehouse (WRU)

== Referees ==
Pro14 2018–19 14-man referee elite squad: (number of matches refereed):

- (Scotland) Mike Adamson (SRU) – (21)
- (South Africa) Stuart Berry (SARU) – (14)
- (Ireland) Andrew Brace (IRFU) – (35)
- (Ireland) George Clancy (IRFU) – (102)
- (Wales) Ian Davies (WRU) – (72)
- (Ireland) Sean Gallagher (IRFU) – (9)
- (South Africa) Quinton Immelman (SARU) – (10)
- (Wales) Dan Jones (WRU) – (14)
- (Ireland) John Lacey (IRFU) – (70)
- (Scotland) Lloyd Linton (SRU) – (21)
- (Italy) Marius Mitrea (FIR) – (78)
- (Ireland) Frank Murphy (IRFU) – (14)
- (Italy) Andrea Piardi (FIR) – (1)
- (Wales) Nigel Owens (WRU) – (166)
- (Wales) Ben Whitehouse (WRU) – (46)

Note: Additional referees are used throughout the season, selected from a select development squad that includes; Craig Evans (2) and Adam Jones (0) – both WRU, Sam Grove-White (3), Ben Blain (2), Keith Allen (1) – SRU and Joy Neville (1) – IRFU

== Attendances by club ==
- Includes quarter-finals and semi-finals – the final is not included as it is held at a neutral venue. Due to the Conference A & B structure of 21 rounds in the Pro14, some teams were allotted 10 league home games during the league stage, while others received 11. Cardiff Blues and Dragons each gave up a home game in the final round of fixtures for Judgement Day, leaving them with nine home games. These figures do not include the final (at a neutral venue) or the European Champions Cup play-off game.

Club	Home games	Total	Average	Highest	Lowest	% Capacity
(Italy) Benetton	10	33,802	3,380	5,000	2,200	50%
(Wales) Cardiff Blues (Note: Cardiff Blues attendance figures does not include the Judgement Day game at the Principality Stadium.)	9	66,237	7,360	12,000	5,312	61%
(South Africa) Cheetahs	11	49,979	4,544	6,500	2,846	9%
(Ireland) Connacht	11	66,142	6,013	8,129	4,056	74%
(Wales) Dragons (Note: Dragons attendance figures does not include the Judgement Day game at the Principality Stadium.)	9	46,111	5,123	7,376	4,012	59%
(Scotland) Edinburgh	10	68,321	6,832	21,190	4,258	10%
(Scotland) Glasgow Warriors	12	92,802	7,734	10,000	7,135	99%
(Ireland) Leinster	12	206,905	17,242	50,120	10,057	78%
(Ireland) Munster	11	142,094	12,918	26,267	8,008	75%
(Wales) Ospreys	11	74,936	6,812	13,251	4,264	36%
(Wales) Scarlets	11	92,877	8,443	12,012	7,180	57%
(South Africa) Southern Kings	10	28,175	2,818	5,096	1,142	14%
(Ireland) Ulster	11	152,182	13,835	17,358	11,882	76%
(Italy) Zebre	11	33,450	3,041	4,600	1,700	60%

=== Highest attendances ===
Date	Game	Stadium	Attendance
27 April 2019	Dragons v Scarlets; Cardiff Blues v Ospreys	Principality Stadium	51,297
6 October 2018	Leinster (h) v Munster	Aviva Stadium	50,120
25 May 2019	Glasgow v Leinster	Celtic Park	47,125
29 December 2018	Munster (h) v Leinster	Thomond Park	26,267
22 December 2018	Edinburgh (h) v Glasgow Warriors	Murrayfield Stadium	21,190
27 April 2019	Munster (h) v Connacht	Thomond Park	19,999
18 May 2019	Leinster (h) v Munster	RDS Arena	18,977
5 January 2019	Leinster (h) v Ulster	RDS Arena	18,099
27 April 2019	Ulster (h) v Leinster	Kingspan Stadium	17,358
21 December 2018	Ulster (h) v Munster	Kingspan Stadium	16,804
22 December 2018	Leinster (h) v Connacht	RDS Arena	16,790

== Player awards ==
=== PRO14 Dream Team ===
The 2018–19 Pro14 Dream Team is:

Pos		Player	Team
FB	15	(Wales) Dan Evans	(Wales) Ospreys
RW	14	(Australia) Monty Ioane	(Italy) Benetton
OC	13	(Samoa) Rey Lee-Lo	(Wales) Cardiff Blues
IC	12	(Ireland) Stuart McCloskey	(Ireland) Ulster
LW	11	(South Africa) Rabz Maxwane	(South Africa) Cheetahs
FH	10	(Ireland) Jack Carty	(Ireland) Connacht
SH	9	(Ireland) John Cooney	(Ireland) Ulster
N8	8	(Fiji) Viliame Mata	(Scotland) Edinburgh
OF	7	(Australia) Colby Fainga'a	(Ireland) Connacht
BF	6	(Ireland) Peter O'Mahony	(Ireland) Munster
RL	5	(Australia) Scott Fardy	(Ireland) Leinster
LL	4	(Ireland) Tadhg Beirne	(Ireland) Munster
TP	3	(Scotland) Zander Fagerson	(Scotland) Glasgow Warriors
HK	2	(Wales) Ken Owens	(Wales) Scarlets
LP	1	(South Africa) Pierre Schoeman	(Scotland) Edinburgh

=== Award winners ===
The 2018–19 Pro14 season award winners are:

Award	Winner
Players' Player of the Season	(Fiji) Viliame Mata (Edinburgh)
Young Player of the Season	(Scotland) Adam Hastings (Glasgow Warriors)
Coach of the Season	(New Zealand) Kieran Crowley (Benetton)
Chairman's Award	(Scotland) Ross Ford (Edinburgh)
Golden Boot	(South Africa) Jaco van der Walt (Edinburgh)
Top Try Scorer	(South Africa) Rabz Maxwane (Cheetahs)
Tackle Machine	(Wales) James King (Ospreys)
Turnover King	(England) Olly Robinson (Cardiff Blues)
Iron Man	(South Africa) Tian Schoeman (Cheetahs)

== Leading scorers ==
Note: Flags to the left of player names indicate national team as has been defined under World Rugby eligibility rules, or primary nationality for players who have not yet earned international senior caps. Players may hold one or more non-WR nationalities.

=== Most points ===
Rank	Player	Club	Points
1	(Ireland) Jack Carty	(Ireland) Connacht	157
2	(Wales) Sam Davies	(Wales) Ospreys	153
3	(Wales) Gareth Anscombe	(Wales) Cardiff Blues	143
4	(Scotland) Adam Hastings	(Scotland) Glasgow Warriors	136
5	(South Africa) Tian Schoeman	(South Africa) Cheetahs	134

=== Most tries ===
Rank	Player	Club	Tries
1	(South Africa) Rabz Maxwane	(South Africa) Cheetahs	14
2	(New Zealand) Johnny McNicholl	(Wales) Scarlets	11
3	(Wales) Dan Evans	(Wales) Ospreys	10
3	(South Africa) Shaun Venter	(South Africa) Cheetahs	10
5	(South Africa) Duhan van der Merwe	(Scotland) Edinburgh	9
5	(Scotland) George Horne	(Scotland) Glasgow Warriors	9
