= 2018–19 European Rugby Challenge Cup pool stage =

- Season: 2018–19 European Rugby Challenge Cup
- Date: 13 October 2018 – 18 January 2019

Qualifiers

The 2018–19 European Rugby Challenge Cup pool stage is the first stage of the competition in the fifth season of the European Rugby Challenge Cup. The competition involves twenty teams competing across five pools of four teams for eight quarter-final places – awarded to the five pool winners and the three top-ranked pool runners-up. The pool stage begins on 13 October 2018 and is due to be completed on 18 January 2019.

== Seeding ==
The 20 competing teams were seeded and split into four tiers; seeding was based on performance in their respective domestic leagues. Where promotion and relegation is in effect in a league, the promoted team was seeded last, or (if multiple teams are promoted) by performance in the lower competition.

Rank	Top 14	Premiership	Pro 14	Continental Shield
1	(France) La Rochelle	(England) Sale Sharks	(Italy) Benetton	(Russia) Enisei-STM
2	(France) Pau	(England) Northampton Saints	(Wales) Ospreys	(Romania) Timișoara Saracens
3	(France) Clermont	(England) Harlequins	(Ireland) Connacht	
4	(France) Bordeaux	(England) Worcester Warriors	(Italy) Zebre	
5	(France) Agen	(England) Bristol Bears	(Wales) Dragons	
6	(France) Stade Français			
7	(France) Perpignan			
8	(France) Grenoble			

Teams will be taken from a league in order of rank and put into a tier. A draw will be used to allocate two second seeds to Tier 1; the remaining team goes into Tier 2. This allocation indirectly determines which fourth-seeded team entered Tier 2, while the others enter Tier 3.

Given the nature of the Continental Shield – a competition including developing rugby nations and Italian clubs not competing in the Pro14 – the two qualifiers from that competition were automatically included in Tier 4 and are seeded equally, despite officially being ranked 1 and 2 from that competition.

The brackets show each team's seeding and their league (for example, 1 Top 14 indicates the team was seeded 1st from the Top 14).

Tier 1	(England) Sale Sharks (1 Prem)	(Italy) Benetton (1 Pro14)	(France) La Rochelle (1 Top 14)	(France) Pau (2 Top 14)	(England) Northampton Saints (2 Prem)
Tier 2	(Wales) Ospreys (2 Pro14)	(England) Harlequins (3 Prem)	(Ireland) Connacht (3 Pro14)	(France) Clermont (3 Top 14)	(Italy) Zebre (4 Pro14)
Tier 3	(England) Worcester Warriors (4 Prem)	(France) Bordeaux (4 Top 14)	(England) Bristol Bears (5 Prem)	(Wales) Dragons (5 Pro14)	(France) Agen (5 Top 14)
Tier 4	(France) Stade Français (6 Top 14)	(France) Perpignan (7 Top 14)	(France) Grenoble (8 Top 14)	(Russia) Enisei-STM (CS 1)	(Romania) Timișoara Saracens (CS 2)

== Pool stage ==
The draw will take place on 20 June 2018 in the Olympic Museum, Lausanne, Switzerland.

Teams in the same pool will play each other twice, both at home and away in the group stage, that will begin in October 2018, and continue through to January 2019, before the pool winners and three best runners-up progressed to the quarter-finals.

Teams will be awarded competition points, based on match result. Teams receive four points for a win, two points for a draw, one attacking bonus point for scoring four or more tries in a match and one defensive bonus point for losing a match by seven points or fewer.

In the event of a tie between two or more teams, the following tie-breakers will be used, as directed by EPCR:

1. Where teams have played each other
  1. The club with the greater number of competition points from only matches involving tied teams.
  2. If equal, the club with the best aggregate points difference from those matches.
  3. If equal, the club that scored the most tries in those matches.
2. Where teams remain tied and/or have not played each other in the competition (i.e. are from different pools)
  1. The club with the best aggregate points difference from the pool stage.
  2. If equal, the club that scored the most tries in the pool stage.
  3. If equal, the club with the fewest players suspended in the pool stage.
  4. If equal, the drawing of lots will determine a club's ranking.

Key to colours
Winner of each pool, advance to quarter-finals.
Three highest-scoring second-place teams advance to quarter-finals.

=== Pool 1 ===
Pos	Team	Pld	W	D	L	PF	PA	PD	TF	TA	TB	LB	Pts
1	(France) Clermont (1)	6	6	0	0	304	117	+187	44	16	6	0	30
2	(England) Northampton Saints (8)	6	4	0	2	282	127	+155	51	18	5	0	21
3	(Wales) Dragons	6	2	0	4	179	201	−22	26	29	2	0	10
4	(Romania) Timișoara Saracens	6	0	0	6	49	369	−320	6	51	0	0	0

Source: espn.co.uk

13 October 2018
12:30

Timișoara Saracens (Romania)	17–54	(Wales) Dragons (1 BP)
Try: Popa 22' c Simionescu 57' c Con: Samoa (2/2) 24', 58'; Pen: Samoa (1/2) 2'	Report	Try: Dee (2) 9' c, 38' m Brown 32' c Howells 39' c Griffiths (2) 50' c, 71' c Penalty try 68'; R. Davies 79' c Con: Lewis (6/7) 10', 33', 40', 51', 72', 80'

Stadionul Dan Păltinișanu
Attendance: 1,000
Referee: Pierre Brousset (FFR)

13 October 2018
15:00

Northampton Saints (England)	20–41	(France) Clermont (1 BP)
Try: Collins 77' c Ribbans 80' c Con: Grayson (2/2) 77', 80'; Pen: Biggar (2/2) 13', 25'	Report	Try: Betham (2) 21' m, 37' m Yato (2) 34' c, 63' c Slimani 51' c Iturria 60' c Con: Laidlaw (4/6) 35', 52', 60', 64'; Pen: Laidlaw (1/1) 14'

Franklin's Gardens
Attendance: 11,712
Referee: Nigel Owens (WRU)

19 October 2018
19:45

Dragons (Wales)	21–35	(England) Northampton Saints (1 BP)
Try: Dee 44' c Sage 63' c Penalty try 80'+1; Con: Lewis (2/2) 44', 63'	Report	Try: Ribbans 4' c Mitchell 13' c Franks 48' c Reinach 69' c Con: Biggar (2/2) 4', 15'; Grayson (2/2) 49', 70'

Rodney Parade
Attendance: 4,600
Referee: Mathieu Raynal (FFR)

20 October 2018
15:00

(1 BP) Clermont (France)	70–12	(Romania) Timișoara Saracens
Try: Yato (2) 6' c, 61' c Betham 17' c Naqalevu (3) 23' c, 38' c, 78' c Tuicuvu (3) 65' c, 67' c, 73' c Iturria 80' c Con: Fernandez (10/10) 7', 18', 24', 39', 61', 66', 68', 74', 79', 80'	Report	Try: Doge 35' c Samoa 57' m Con: Samoa (1/2) 36'

Stade Marcel-Michelin
Attendance: 16,110
Referee: Ben Blain (SRU)

8 December 2018
12:30

Timișoara Saracens (Romania)	14–47	(France) Clermont (1 BP)
Try: Zaharia 15' c Muresan 67' c Con: Conache (1/1) 17'; Rupanu (1/1) 68'	Report	Try: Beheregaray 5' m Raka (2) 12' c, 80' c Uhila 39' c Cancoriet 50' c Moala 56' c Jedrasiak 75' c Con: Nanai-Williams (6/7) 13', 40', 52', 57', 76', 80'

Stadionul Dan Păltinișanu
Attendance: 2,000
Referee: Craig Evans (WRU)

8 December 2018
15:00

(1 BP) Northampton Saints (England)	48–14	(Wales) Dragons
Try: Burrell (2) 1' m, 45' c Ratuniyarawa 10' c Fish 39' c Naiyaravoro (2) 50' m, 56' m Mitchell 52' m Sleightholme 79' c Con: Biggar (4/8) 11', 40', 45', 80'	Report	Try: Warren 41' c Cudd 77' c Con: Lewis (2/2) 42', 78'

Franklin's Gardens
Attendance: 10,637
Referee: Thomas Charabas (FFR)

15 December 2018

Timișoara Saracens (Romania)	0–28 (Note: Game was cancelled but would later be awarded as a 28–0 bonus point win to Northampton Saints as Timișoara Saracens were deemed not to have taken necessary steps to ensure the game would take place despite bad weather.)	(England) Northampton Saints (1 BP)

Stadionul Dan Păltinișanu

- Cancelled due to unplayable pitch caused by extreme weather (snow), with no suitable alternative venue available. Game would later be awarded an automatic bonus point win to Northampton Saints.

15 December 2018
13:00

(1 BP) Clermont (France)	49–24	(Wales) Dragons
Try: Cancoriet (2) 4' c, 32' c Naqalevu (2) 18' c, 68' c Betham 26' c Lee 45' c Cassang 76' c Con: Laidlaw (7/7) 5', 19', 27', 33', 46', 69', 77'	Report	Try: Dee 24' c Wainwright 38' c R. Williams 65' c Con: Lewis (3/3) 24', 39', 67'; Pen: Lewis (1/1) 13'

Stade Marcel-Michelin
Attendance: 15,700
Referee: Tom Foley (IRFU)

11 January 2019
19:30

(1 BP) Dragons (Wales)	59–3	(Romania) Timișoara Saracens
Try: Amos (2) 11' m, 27' m Talbot-Davies (2) 39' c, 59' c R. Davies (2) 41' c, 69' c Screech 56' c J. Williams 66' c c Fry 68' c Con: Tovey (7/9) 40', 41', 57', 60', 67', 68', 70'	Report	Pen: Samoa (1/3) 2'

Rodney Parade
Attendance: 4,600
Referee: Ludovic Cayre (FFR)

12 January 2019
20:00

(1 BP) Clermont (France)	48–40	(England) Northampton Saints (1 BP)
Try: Timani 1' c Yato 9' c Betham (2) 28' m, 58' c Fofana (2) 32' m, 47' m Grosso 77' c Con: Parra (4/6) 3', 10', 47', 59'; Laidlaw (1/1) 78'; Pen: Parra (1) 25'	Report	Try: Dingwall 4' m Mitchell 7' c Harrison (3) 44' c, 49' c, 67' c Reinach 56' c Con: Biggar (1/2) 7'; Grayson (4/4) 45', 50', 57', 68'

Stade Marcel-Michelin
Attendance: 15,629
Referee: John Lacey (IRFU)

18 January 2019
19:45

Dragons (Wales)	7–49	(France) Clermont (1 BP)
Try: J. Williams 77' c Con: Lewis (1/1) 78'	Report	Try: Fernandez 9' c Fischer 13' c Jedrasiak (2) 16' c, 74' c Grosso (2) 22', 30'; Betham 57' c Con: Fernandez (7/7) 9', 14', 17', 23', 30', 58', 75'

Rodney Parade
Attendance: 4,306
Referee: Ian Tempest (RFU)

18 January 2019
19:45

(1 BP) Northampton Saints (England)	111–3	(Romania) Timișoara Saracens
Try: Marshall (2) 3' c, 16' c Hutchinson 19' c Mitchell (3) 23' c, 29' m, 54' m Sleightholme (4) 32' c, 46' c, 56' c, 71' c Kellaway 39' m Eadie (2) 48' c, 66' c Coles 59' c Ludlam 61' c Tuitavake 64' m Con: Grayson (11/14) 3', 17', 20', 25', 33', 46', 49', 57', 60', 62', 66'; Hutchinson (2/2) 71', 80'+1	Report	Pen: Samoa (1/1) 12'

Franklin's Gardens
Attendance: 11,739
Referee: Joy Neville (IRFU)

=== Pool 2 ===
Pos	Team	Pld	W	D	L	PF	PA	PD	TF	TA	TB	LB	Pts
1	(England) Worcester Warriors (4)	6	5	0	1	150	125	+25	19	16	2	0	22
2	(Wales) Ospreys	6	2	0	4	141	105	+36	18	12	2	3	13
3	(France) Pau	6	3	0	3	89	127	−38	12	16	1	0	13
4	(France) Stade Français	6	2	0	4	140	163	−23	16	21	2	2	12

Source: espn.co.uk

13 October 2018
15:00

(1 BP) Ospreys (Wales)	27–0	(France) Pau
Try: Hook 6' c North 46' c L. Morgan 56' m H. Morgan 80' m Con: S. Davies (1/1) 7'; Hook (1/3) 47'; Pen: Hook (1/1) 36'	Report

Liberty Stadium
Attendance: 6,072
Referee: Tom Foley (IRFU)

13 October 2018
20:00

Stade Français (France)	27–38	(England) Worcester Warriors (1 BP)
Try: Hamdaoui 14' c Panis 63' c Van Zyl 73' c Con: Plisson (1/1) 15'; Steyn (2/2) 63', 73'; Pen: Plisson (2/3) 1', 37'	Report	Try: Cox 8' c Howe (2) 25' c, 40' c Hill 51' c Shillcock 70' c Con: Lance (5/5) 9', 26', 40'+1, 52', 71'; Pen: Lance (1/3) 23'

Stade Jean-Bouin
Attendance: 6,880
Referee: Dan Jones (WRU)

20 October 2018
13:00

Pau (France)	21–15	(France) Stade Français (1 BP)
Try: Blanc 30' m Penalty try 35'; Pen: Hastoy (3/3) 12', 45', 62'	Report	Try: Yobo 57' m Van Zyl 68' c Con: Steyn (1/2) 69'; Pen: Plisson (1/2) 3'

Stade du Hameau
Attendance: 9,730
Referee: Hamish Smales (RFU)

20 October 2018
15:00

Worcester Warriors (England)	27–21	(Wales) Ospreys (1 BP)
Try: Shillcock 11' c Olivier 16' c Singleton 36' c Con: Shillcock (3/3) 12', 17', 37'; Pen: Shillcock (2/2) 64', 69'	Report	Try: Allen 43' c, 73' c McCusker 57' c Con: Hook (1/1) 44'; Evans (2/2) 58', 75'

Sixways Stadium
Attendance: 6,823
Referee: Pierre Brousset (FFR)

7 December 2018
19:00

Pau (France)	21–6	(England) Worcester Warriors
Try: Slade (2) 1' c, 41' c Blanc 77' c Con: Slade (2/2) 2', 41'; Hastoy (1/1) 77'; Pen: Slade (0/1)	Report	Pen: Shillcock (2/3) 9', 27'

Stade du Hameau
Attendance: 6,149
Referee: Frank Murphy (IRFU)

8 December 2018
15:00

(1 BP) Ospreys (Wales)	51–20	(France) Stade Français
Try: Allen (2) 12' c, 30' c R. Jones 44' c Penalty Try; Morgan 74' c Watkin 80' c Con: S. Davies (3/3) 13', 31', 45'; Hook (2/2) 75', 80'+5; Pen: S. Davies (3/3) 8', 21', 40'+3	Report	Try: Yobo 25' c Arias 70' c Con: Steyn (2/2) 26', 71'; Pen: Steyn (2/2) 6', 19'

Liberty Stadium
Attendance: 5,893
Referee: Craig Maxwell-Keys (RFU)

14 December 2018
19:45

Stade Français (France)	12–3	(Wales) Ospreys
Pen: Sánchez (4/4) 6', 21', 41', 60'	Report	Pen: Hook (1/1) 52'; C. Evans (0/1)

Stade Jean-Bouin
Attendance: 6,540
Referee: Mike Adamson (SRU)

15 December 2018
15:00

Worcester Warriors (England)	23–7	(France) Pau
Try: Adams 9' c Fa'osiliva 14' c Con: Weir (2/2) 11', 16'; Pen: Weir (3/3) 25', 40'+1, 44'	Report	Try: Mowen 7' c Con: Slade (1/1) 8'

Sixways Stadium
Attendance: 6,773
Referee: Ian Davies (WRU)

11 January 2019
19:45

(1 BP) Stade Français (France)	35–14	(France) Pau
Try: Fickou 9' c Ensor 47' c Arias 57' c Arrate 69' c Steyn 79' c Con: Plisson (3/3) 10', 48', 71'; Steyn (2/2) 58', 80'	Report	Try: Penalty Try 40'+3; Slade 61' c Con: Hastoy (1/1) 61'

Stade Jean-Bouin
Attendance: 4,250
Referee: Dan Jones (WRU)

12 January 2019
15:00

(1 BP) Ospreys (Wales)	18–20	(England) Worcester Warriors
Try: Giles 17' m Cracknell 33' c Con: Price (1/2) 34'; Pen: Price (1/1) 24'; S. Davies (1/1) 74'	Report	Try: Arr 10' c Lawrence 47' m Hammond 56' m Con: Van Breda (1/3) 11'; Drop: Mills (1/1) 79'

Liberty Stadium
Attendance: 6,184
Referee: Alexandre Ruiz (FFR)

January 2019

(1 BP) Pau (France)	26–21	(Wales) Ospreys (1 BP)
Try: Pinto 28' c Ramsay 59' c Nueno 64' c Bouchet 74' m Con: Hastoy (3/4) 29', 60', 65'	Report	Try: Thomas-Wheeler 41' c Kôtze (2) 46' c, 61' c Con: S. Davies (3/3) 42', 47', 62'

Stade du Hameau
Attendance: 4,524
Referee: Frank Murphy (IRFU)

January 2019

(1 BP) Worcester Warriors (England)	36–31	(France) Stade Français (2 BP)
Try: Howe (2) 3' c, 77' m Kerrod 28' c Lewis 59' m Lawrence 73' c Hammond 80'+3 m Con: Pennell (3/6) 3', 29', 74'	Report	Try: Chapuis 6' c Sempéré 19' c Coville 23' c Danty 37' c Con: Plisson (4/4) 7', 20', 24', 38'; Pen: Plisson (0/1); Sánchez (1/1) 75'

Sixways Stadium
Attendance: 6,978
Referee: Sean Gallagher (IRFU)

=== Pool 3 ===
Pos	Team	Pld	W	D	L	PF	PA	PD	TF	TA	TB	LB	Pts
1	(England) Sale Sharks (3)	6	4	0	2	196	108	+88	27	12	4	2	22
2	(Ireland) Connacht (6)	6	5	0	1	146	120	+26	19	14	2	0	22
3	(France) Bordeaux Bègles	6	2	1	3	137	171	−34	17	23	1	1	12
4	(France) Perpignan	6	0	1	5	117	197	−80	13	27	0	1	3

Source: espn.co.uk

12 October 2018
17:45

Perpignan (France)	24–41	(England) Sale Sharks (1 BP)
Try: Lucas 16' c Lemala 80'+3 m Con: Bousquet (1/1) 17'; Pen: Bousquet (4/4) 30', 37', 40', 45'	Report	Try: McGuigan (3) 6' c, 68' c, 76' c Webber 19' m Rensburg 37' c James 57' m Con: De Klerk (3/5) 8', 39', 69'; Cliff (1/1) 77'; Pen: De Klerk (1/2) 62'

Stade Aimé Giral
Attendance: 8,038
Referee: Joy Neville (IRFU)

13 October 2018
15:00

Connacht (Ireland)	22–10	(France) Bordeaux Bègles
Try: Godwin (2) 13' c, 45' c Bealham 66' m Con: Carty (2/3) 14', 46'; Pen: Carty (1/1) 23'	Report	Try: Amosa 52' c Con: Meret (1/1) 53'; Pen: Meret (1/1) 40'

The Sportsground
Attendance: 4,878
Referee: Mike Adamson (SRU)

20 October 2018
15:00

(1 BP) Sale Sharks (England)	34–14	(Ireland) Connacht
Try: Ashton (3) 36' c, 56' c, 63' c Beaumont 53' c Con: De Klerk (4/4) 38', 54', 57', 65'; Pen: De Klerk (2/2) 19', 27'	Report	Try: Delahunt 30' c Con: C. Fitzgerald (1/1) 32'; Pen: C. Fitzgerald (2/2) 1', 16'

AJ Bell Stadium
Attendance: 4,249
Referee: Ben Whitehouse (WRU)

20 October 2018
18:00

Bordeaux Bègles (France)	25–25	(France) Perpignan
Try: Poirot 22' c Pélissié 55' c Gimbert 73' m Con: Serin (1/1) 23'; Meret (1/2) 56'; Pen: Serin (1/1) 12'; Meret (1/1) 60'	Report	Try: Shahn (2) 8' m, 37' m Pen: Jackson (3/3) 32', 48', 55'; Seguy (2/2) 64', 71'

Stade Chaban-Delmas
Attendance: 17,129
Referee: Tom Foley (IRFU)

8 December 2018
15:00

Connacht (Ireland)	22–10	(France) Perpignan
Try: Leader 9' c Aki 19' c Godwin 77' m Con: Horwitz (2/2) 10', 20'; C. Fitzgerald (0/1); Pen: Horwitz (1/2) 44'	Report	Try: Leiataua 65' c Con: Bousquet (1/1) 66'; Pen: Bousquet (1/1) 47'

The Sportsground
Attendance: 5,011
Referee: Karl Dickson (RFU)

8 December 2018
18:00

Bordeaux Bègles (France)	24–50	(England) Sale Sharks (1 BP)
Try: Donvo 5' c Amosa 70' c Dominici 80' c Con: Meret (3/3) 6', 71', 80'+2; Pen: Meret (1/1) 14'	Report	Try: Odogwu (2) 9' m, 76' m Ashton (2) 28' c, 34' m Cliff 47' c Curry 38' c Solomona 64' c Con: Cliff (4/7) 30', 40', 48', 65'

Stade Chaban-Delmas
Attendance: 12,600
Referee: Ian Davies (WRU)

14 December 2018
19:00

Perpignan (France)	21–36	(Ireland) Connacht (1 BP)
Try: Farnoux 7' m Leiataua 41' m Fainga'anuku 46' m Con: Jackson (0/3); Pen: Jackson (1/1) 12'; Ecochard (1/1) 59'	Report	Try: O'Brien (2) 19' c, 34' m Heffernan 25' c Healy 67' c Kelleher 68' c Con: C. Fitzgerald (2/3) 20', 25'; Carty (2/2) 68', 70'; Pen: C. Fitzgerald (1/2) 40'

Stade Aimé Giral
Attendance: 5,166
Referee: Ian Tempest (RFU)

15 December 2018
15:00

(1 BP) Sale Sharks (England)	14–17	(France) Bordeaux Bègles
Try: James 12' c Webber 57' c Con: Du Preez (2/2) 12', 58'	Report	Try: Dufour (2) 33', 45'; Con: Serin (2/2) 34', 46'; Pen: Serin (1/1) 50'

AJ Bell Stadium
Attendance: 3,049
Referee: Sean Gallagher (IRFU)

11 January 2019
19:00

(1 BP) Perpignan (France)	27–34	(France) Bordeaux Bègles (1 BP)
Try: Ecochard 14' c Duguivalu 45'; Deligny 75' c Con: Jackson (3/3) 15', 45', 76'; Pen: Jackson (2/2) 31', 61'	Report	Try: Lesgourgues 9' c Woki 26' c Tilsley 40' c Plazy 42' m Amosa 66' m Con: Meret (2/4) 10', 40'+1; Domvo (1/1) 27'

Stade Aimé Giral
Attendance: 3,666
Referee: Karl Dickson (RFU)

12 January 2019
15:00

Connacht (Ireland)	20–18	(England) Sale Sharks (1 BP)
Try: Godwin 19' c Mitchell 21' c Con: Carty (2/2) 20', 22'; Pen: Carty (1/1) 12'; Horwitz (1/1) 71'	Report	Try: Ashton 39' c De Klerk 49' m Con: De Klerk (1/2) 40'; Pen: De Klerk (2/2) 61', 64'

The Sportsground
Attendance: 6,229
Referee: Pierre Brousset (FFR)

19 January 2019
15:00

(1 BP) Bordeaux Bègles (France)	27–33	(Ireland) Connacht (1 BP)
Try: Amosa 23' c Poirot 38' c Serin 48' c Con: Meret (3/3) 24', 40', 49'; Pen: Meret (2/2) 15', 26'	Report	Try: Healy (2) 9' m, 70' c Roux 18' c O'Halloran 34' c Carty 77' c Con: Horwitz (2/3) 19', 35'; Carty (2/2) 71', 78'

Stade Chaban-Delmas
Attendance: 11,899
Referee: Marius Mitrea (FIR)

19 January 2019
15:00

(1 BP) Sale Sharks (England)	39–10	(France) Perpignan
Try: Ashton 8' c Reed 15' m Beaumont 47' c Wilkinson 58' c Bristow 69'; Con: De Clerk (3/4) 9', 48', 59'; Cliff (1/1) 70'; Pen: De Clerk (1/1) 37'; Cliff (1/1) 66'	Report	Try: Pujol (2) 3' m, 78' m Con: Bousquet (0/1); Selponi (0/1); Pen: Bousquet (0/1)

AJ Bell Stadium
Attendance: 4,359
Referee: Craig Evans (WRU)

=== Pool 4 ===
Pos	Team	Pld	W	D	L	PF	PA	PD	TF	TA	TB	LB	Pts
1	(France) La Rochelle (2)	6	5	0	1	238	104	+134	32	15	4	0	24
2	(England) Bristol Bears (7)	6	4	0	2	267	108	+159	42	13	4	1	21
3	(Italy) Zebre	6	3	0	3	153	142	+11	21	18	2	0	14
4	(Russia) Enisei-STM	6	0	0	6	103	407	−304	14	63	1	0	1

Source: espn.co.uk

13 October 2018
9:00

Enisei-STM (Russia)	21–82	(France) La Rochelle (1 BP)
Try: Simplikevich (2) 9' c, 67' c Gachechiladze 25' c Con: Kushnarev (3/3) 11', 26', 68'	Report	Try: Alldritt 1' c Lafage 13' c Forbes 19' c Jordaan (2) 22' c, 58' c Andreu 28' c Goillot (2) 40' c, 70' c Camou 41' c Aguillon (2) 52' c, 75' m West 80' c Con: Lafage (10/11) 3', 14', 20', 23', 29', 40', 41', 53', 60', 71'; West (1/1) 80'

Krasny Yar Stadium
Attendance: 2,700
Referee: Christophe Ridley (RFU)

13 October 2018
15:00

(1 BP) Bristol Bears (England)	43–22	(Italy) Zebre
Try: Leiua 6' c Edwards (2) 12' m, 31' c Latta 17' c Haining 20' m Armstrong 39' m Uren 62' c Con: Sheedy (3/6) 7', 18', 33'; Bedlow (1/1) 62'	Report	Try: Bello 37' c Castello 42' c Boni 73' m Con: Brummer (2/2) 37', 43'; Canna (0/1); Pen: Brummer (1/1) 10'

Ashton Gate Stadium
Attendance: 8,852
Referee: Frank Murphy (IRFU)

19 October 2018
19:00

(1 BP) La Rochelle (France)	64–24	(Russia) Enisei-STM (1 BP)
Try: Jordaan 2' c Qovu 5' c Camou (2) 24' c, 36' c Plessis-Couillaud 30' m Alldritt 40'+1 c Gourdon 51' c Berjon 54' m Orioli 66' m Boughanmi 76' c Con: Lafage (6/8) 3', 6', 25', 37', 40'+2, 52'; West (1/2) 77'	Report	Try: Sherban 18' c Saulite (3) 34' m, 73' c, 80' c Con: Kushnarev (3/4) 19', 17', 80'+1

Stade Marcel-Deflandre
Attendance: 15,000
Referee: Vlad Iordăchescu (FRR)

20 October 2018
14:00

Zebre (Italy)	20–17	(England) Bristol Bears (1 BP)
Try: Canna 32' c Tuivaiti 37' c Con: Canna (2/2); Pen: Canna (2/2)	Report	Try: Pincus (2) 15'c, 40'+1 c Con: Sheedy (2/2) 16', 40'+1; Pen: Sheedy (1/1) 69'

Stadio Sergio Lanfranchi
Attendance: 2,800
Referee: Ludovic Cayre (FFR)

8 December 2018
12:00

Enisei-STM (Russia)	14–31	(Italy) Zebre (1 BP)
Try: Churashov 7' c Gachechiladze 36' c Con: Kushnarev (2/2) 8', 37'	Report	Try: Palazzani (2) 3' c, 50' c Canna 21' c Meyer 75' c Con: Canna (4/4) 4', 22', 51', 77'; Pen: Canna (1/1) 49'

Yug Stadium, Sochi
Attendance: 500
Referee: Ian Tempest (RFU)

8 December 2018
15:00

(1 BP) Bristol Bears (England)	22–35	(France) La Rochelle (1 BP)
Try: Thacker 6' m Heenan 17' m Pincus 67' m Powell 76' c Con: Sheedy (1/4) 77'	Report	Try: Alldritt 19' c Sazy 40' c Favre 44' c Rattez 47' c Sinzelle 61' c Con: Lafage (5/5) 20', 40'+1, 45', 48', 63'

Ashton Gate Stadium
Attendance: 8,589
Referee: Ben Whitehouse (WRU)

15 December 2018
15:00

(1 BP) Zebre (Italy)	58–14	(Russia) Enisei-STM
Try: Padovani 1' m Canna (2) 32' m, 68' m Renton 14' c Sisi 50' c Luus 57' c Balekana (2) 65' c, 75' m Tauyavuca 78' c Con: Canna (5/9) 15', 51', 58', 65', 78'; Pen: Canna (1/1) 6'	Report	Try: Gerasimov (2) 27', 53'; Con: Churashov (2/2) 28', 54'

Stadio Sergio Lanfranchi
Attendance: 1,500
Referee: Ben Blain (SRFU)

15 December 2018
20:00

La Rochelle (France)	3–13	(England) Bristol Bears
Pen: Retiere (1/1) 20'	Report	Try: Crane 46' c Con: Sheedy (1/1) 48'; Pen: Sheedy (2/2) 15', 28'

Stade Marcel-Deflandre
Attendance: 15,000
Referee: Frank Murphy (IRFU)

11 January 2019
19:00

(1 BP) La Rochelle (France)	32–12	(Italy) Zebre
Try: Priso 46' c Retiere 52' m Veivuke 57' c Forbes 80'+2 c Con: West (2/2) 47', 58'; Retiere (0/1); Lafage (1/1) 80'+3; Pen: West (2/2) 11', 13'	Report	Try: Di Giulio 28' m Mbanda 38' c Con: Brummer (0/1); Palazzani (1/1) 40'

Stade Marcel-Deflandre
Attendance: 15,000
Referee: Neil Chivers (RFU)

12 January 2019
12:00

Enisei-STM (Russia)	9–65	(England) Bristol Bears (1 BP)
Pen: Gaisin (3/3) 11', 18', 27'	Report	Try: O'Conor (2) 4' c, 76' m Joyce 13' m Fenton-Wells (3) 20' m, 53' c, 71' c Haining 34' m Protheroe 40' m Armstrong 51' c Graham 58' c Pincus 62' m Con: Sheedy (5/11) 5', 51', 54', 59', 72'

Yug Stadium, Sochi
Attendance: 100
Referee: Nika Amashukeli (GRU)

19 January 2019
15:00

(1 BP) Bristol Bears (England)	107–19	(Russia) Enisei-STM
Try: Crane (2) 3' c, 42' m Pincus (2) 11' m, 74' m Edwards (3) 14' c, 54' c, 78' c Uren (5) 18' m, 26' c, 32' c, 38' c, 56' c Lindsay 23' m Thomas 46' c O'Conor 58' c Graham 67' m Cullen 71' c Con: Sheedy (11/17) 4', 16', 27', 33', 39', 46', 55', 57', 59', 72', 80'	Report	Try: Simplikevich 7' c Saulite 50' c Selskii 63' m Con: Gaisin (1/1) 9'; Biakov (1/2) 51'

Ashton Gate Stadium
Attendance: 7,983
Referee: Thomas Charabas (FFR)

19 January 2019
15:00

Zebre (Italy)	10–22	(France) La Rochelle
Try: Biagi 10' c Con: Canna (1/1) 10'; Pen: Canna (1/2) 3'	Report	Try: Retiere 29' c Con: West (1/1) 30'; Pen: West (5/7) 40', 42', 51', 56', 74'

Stadio Sergio Lanfranchi
Attendance: 1,800
Referee: Tom Foley (IRFU)

=== Pool 5 ===
Pos	Team	Pld	W	D	L	PF	PA	PD	TF	TA	TB	LB	Pts
1	(England) Harlequins (5)	6	4	0	2	179	113	+66	23	13	3	2	21
2	(Italy) Benetton	6	4	0	2	171	106	+65	23	12	3	1	20
3	(France) Grenoble	6	2	0	4	92	159	−67	11	21	0	1	9
4	(France) Agen	6	2	0	4	112	176	−64	15	26	0	1	9

Source: espn.co.uk

13 October 2018
14:00

(1 BP) Benetton (Italy)	40–14	(France) Grenoble
Try: Hayward 15' c Allan (2) 46' c, 50' c Ruzza 23' c Faiva 73'; Brex 76'; Con: Allan (4/4) 16', 24', 47', 51'; Rizzi (1/2) 77'	Report	Try: Casey 38' c Aulika 70’ c Con: Nanette (2/2) 40', 71'

Stadio Comunale di Monigo
Attendance: 2,480
Referee: Craig Maxwell-Keys (RFU)

13 October 2018
15:00

(1 BP) Harlequins (England)	54–22	(France) Agen
Try: Brown 13' c Mulchrone 25' c Kunatani (2) 29' c, 77' c Earle 42' m Merrick 50' c Marchant 70' c Con: Smith (4/5) 15', 26', 30', 52'; Catrakilis (2/2) 71', 78'	Report	Try: Tolot 34' m Yaha 53' c Bosch 75' c Con: Berdeu (2/3) 54', 76'; Pen: Berdeu (1/1) 24'

Twickenham Stoop
Attendance: 9,532
Referee: Ian Davies (WRU)

19 October 2018
18:30

Agen (France)	20–19	(Italy) Benetton (1 BP)
Try: Miquel 30' c Tanga 52' c Con: McIntyre (2/2) 31', 54'; Pen: McIntyre (2/2) 40' + 1, 48'; Berdeu (0/1)	Report	Try: Bigi (2) 2' c, 14' m Tavuyara 44' c Con: Allan (2/3) 3', 46'

Stade Armandie
Attendance: 3,187
Referee: Karl Dickson (RFU)

20 October 2018
20:00

Grenoble (France)	19–13	(England) Harlequins (1 BP)
Try: Visinia 64' c Con: Francis (1/1) 65'; Pen: Glenat (3/4) 2', 10', 29'; Francis (1/1) 68'	Report	Try: Smith 6' c Con: Smith (1/1) 7'; Pen: Smith (2/2) 41', 48'

Stade des Alpes
Attendance: 7,730
Referee: Sean Gallagher (IRFU)

7 December 2018
19:45

Grenoble (France)	22–15	(France) Agen (1 BP)
Try: Capelli 16' c Nanette 34' m Dardet 65' c Con: Glenat (1/2) 17'; Latorre (1/1) 67'; Pen: Latorre (1/1) 58'	Report	Try: Tolot 40' m Yaha 42' m Masilevu 62' m Con: Vincent (0/3)

Stade des Alpes
Attendance: 6,970
Referee: Vlad Iordăchescu (FRR)

8 December 2018
14:00

Benetton (Italy)	26–21	(England) Harlequins (1 BP)
Try: Sperandio (2) 5' c, 37' m Ioane 79' m Con: McKinley (1/3) 6'; Pen: McKinley (3/3) 11', 31', 52'	Report	Try: Dombrandt (2) 1', 23'; Con: Lang (1/2) 23'; Pen: Smith (3/3) 47', 58', 75'

Stadio Comunale di Monigo
Attendance: 4,600
Referee: Daniel Jones (WRU)

14 December 2018
18:30

Agen (France)	14–10	(France) Grenoble (1 BP)
Try: Rokoduru 72' m Con: Vincent (0/1); Pen: Berdeu (3/3) 3', 40', 78'	Report	Try: Dardet 18' c Con: Ugalde (1/1) 18'; Pen: Ugalde (1/1) 51'; Latorre (0/1)

Stade Armandie
Attendance: 2,020
Referee: Craig Evans (WRU)

15 December 2018
14:00

Harlequins (England)	20–9	(Italy) Benetton
Try: Boyce 6' c Marchant 23'; Con: Lang (2/2) 7', 24'; Pen: Lang (1/1) 39; Smith (1/1) 68'	Report	Pen: McKinley (3/4) 12', 18', 33'

Twickenham Stoop
Attendance: 6,838
Referee: Pierre Brousset (FFR)

12 January 2019
14:00

(1 BP) Benetton (Italy)	38–24	(France) Agen
Try: Tebaldi (3) 3' m, 14' c, 64' c Ioane 43' c Tavuyara (2) 48' m, 58' c Con: McKinley (4/6) 15', 44', 60', 65'	Report	Try: Hocquet 37' c Vaka 69'; Tetrashvili 74'; Con: Verdu (1/1) 38' c Vincent (2/2) 70', 75'; Pen: Verdu (1/2) 31'

Stadio Comunale di Monigo
Attendance: 2,900
Referee: Ben Blain (SRU)

12 January 2019
15:00

(1 BP) Harlequins (England)	38–20	(France) Grenoble
Try: Care 9' c Brown 14' c Murley 18' c Crumpton 29' c Dombrandt 79' c Con: Marcus Smith (4/4) 10', 15', 20', 31'; Lang (1/1) 80'; Pen: Lang (1/1) 65'	Report	Try: Berruyer 1' m Cordin (2) 23' c, 34' m Con: Lucas (1/3) 24'; Pen: Lucas (1/1) 43'; Glenat (0/1)

Twickenham Stoop
Attendance: 9,239
Referee: Mike Adamson (SRU)

18 January 2019
18:45

Agen (France)	17–33	(England) Harlequins (1 BP)
Try: Saurs 18' c Peyri 68' m Metge 72' m Con: McIntyre (1/1) 19'; Berdeu (0/2)	Report	Try: Clifford 5' c Crumpton 34' m Ibitoye 40'+1 c Earle 43' c Marchant 62' c Con: Smith (4/5) 5', 40'+2, 44', 63'

Stade Armandie
Attendance: 2,090
Referee: Ben Whitehouse (WRU)

18 January 2019
18:45

Grenoble (France)	7–39	(Italy) Benetton (1 BP)
Try: Dussartre 32' c Con: Glenat (1/1) 33'; Pen: Glenat (0/1)	Report	Try: Baravalle 7' c Tavuyara (2) 18' c, 71' m Ioane 24' c Da Oleggio 53' c Con: Allan (4/5) 8', 19', 26', 54'; Pen: Allan (2/2) 12', 40'+2

Stade des Alpes
Attendance: 7,897
Referee: Christophe Ridley (RFU)

== See also ==
- 2018–19 European Rugby Champions Cup
