= Oliver Robinson (disambiguation) =

Oliver Robinson (born 1960) is an American basketball player and politician.

Ollie Robinson is an English bowler who plays for Sussex County Cricket Club.

Ollie or Olly Robinson may refer to:

- Oliver Robinson, 2nd Marquess of Ripon
- Ollie Robinson (cricketer, born 1998), English wicket-keeper who plays for Durham County Cricket Club
- Olly Robinson, Cardiff Blues rugby union player
