= Bryan Byrne (rugby union) =

- Born: 9 September 1993 (age 33) Carlow, Ireland
- Height: 1.78 m (5 ft 10 in)
- Weight: 104 kg (16.4 st; 229 lb)
- School: Clongowes Wood College
- Notable relative: Ed Byrne

Rugby union career
- Position: Hooker
Amateur team(s)
Years	Team	Apps	(Points)
- Clontarf
Senior career
Years	Team	Apps	(Points)
2014–2020	Leinster	51	(60)
2020–2023	Bristol Bears	43	(60)
2023–	Newcastle	29	(10)
- Correct as of 8 August 2025
International career
Years	Team	Apps	(Points)
2011	Ireland U18	3	(0)
2012	Ireland U19	2	(0)
2013–2014	Ireland U20	6	(0)
- Correct as of 9 Apr 2015

Bryan Byrne (born 9 September 1993) is an Irish rugby union player who plays for Newcastle Red Bulls in the Premiership Rugby competition.

== Career ==
Byrne started playing rugby at the early age of 6 with his local club Carlow RFC. He went onto secondary school at Clongowes Wood College. During this time he won the coveted Junior/Senior Cups, and caught the eye of both Leinster and Ireland where he won caps over a 4 year period U17s, U18s, U19s and U20s. His preferred position is hooker. His senior debut for Leinster was September 2014 against Glasgow Warriors

It was announced in April 2015 that he had been awarded a senior contract with Leinster following completion of his time in the academy, having previously played with the Leinster senior team and captained Leinster to two B/I Cups whilst winning a pro 14 In 2018 was part of the victorious Leinster Heineken winning team.

Having initially moved on loan in 2020 to the Bristol Bears he shone, determined to impress in the process he bagged some tries, thereafter signed a permanent contract of that year.

Byrne studied in UCD: has a Bachelor of Science Degree and a Diploma in Project Management from Dublin Business School.
