= James Tracy (rugby union) =

Irish rugby union footballer (born 1991)

- Born: 2 April 1991 (age 35) Kill, County Kildare, Ireland
- Height: 1.83 m (6 ft 0 in)
- Weight: 106 kg (16.7 st; 234 lb)
- School: Newbridge College
- University: University College Dublin

Rugby union career
- Position: Hooker
Amateur team(s)
| Years | Team | Apps | (Points) |
- UCD
Senior career
| Years | Team | Apps | (Points) |
| 2012–2022 | Leinster | 141 | (90) |
- Correct as of 22 Dec 2022
International career
| Years | Team | Apps | (Points) |
| 2011 | Ireland U20 | 10 | (5) |
| 2014 | Emerging Ireland | 3 | (5) |
| 2016–2017 | Ireland | 6 | (5) |
- Correct as of 22 December 2022

James Tracy (born 1991) is a former Irish rugby union player for Leinster Rugby. His preferred position was hooker. He made his senior debut in November 2012 against the Ospreys. In May 2014 he was promoted to the Leinster senior squad for the 2014–15 season following completion of the academy. Tracy made his debut for Ireland against Canada on 12 November 2016, scoring a try after coming on as replacement in second half. He went on to win 5 more caps with Ireland, with a start against Japan in 2017.

On 22 December 2022, he announced his retirement from rugby, due to an ongoing neck injury.
