= Apisai Tauyavuca =

Fijian rugby union player (born 1993)

- Born: 1 April 1993 (age 33) Suva, Fiji
- Height: 1.99 m (6 ft 6 in)
- Weight: 113 kg (249 lb; 17 st 11 lb)

Rugby union career
- Position: Lock / Flanker
- Current team: Zebre
Youth career
- Hamilton Boys' High School
- –: Queen Victoria School
- –: Tokyo University RFC
Senior career
Years	Team	Apps	(Points)
- Suva Rugby
2017	Fijian Drua	4	(0)
2018–2020	Zebre	28	(25)
2021–	Houston SaberCats	9	(0)
- Correct as of 19 May 2020

Apisai Tauyavuca (born 1 April 1993 in Suva, Fiji) is a Fijian rugby union player who previously played for the Houston SaberCats in Major League Rugby (MLR). His usual position is as a Lock or Flanker.

In 2017, Tauyavuca was a member of the Fijian Drua squad and for 2018-19 Pro14 and 2019-20 Pro14 seasons he played for Zebre .
