= Ed Byrne (rugby union) =

Irish rugby union player

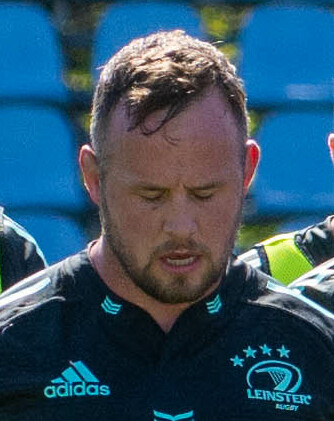
- Born: 9 September 1993 (age 33) Carlow, Ireland
- Height: 1.80 m (5 ft 11 in)
- Weight: 114.09 kg (17.966 st; 251.5 lb)
- School: Clongowes Wood College
- Notable relative: Bryan Byrne (brother)

Rugby union career
- Position: Prop
Amateur team(s)
Years	Team	Apps	(Points)
- UCD
Senior career
Years	Team	Apps	(Points)
2014–24	Leinster	97	(65)
2024–26	Cardiff	8	(5)
2026	→Leinster	3	(0)
- Correct as of 14 May 2026
International career
Years	Team	Apps	(Points)
2011	Ireland U18	4	(0)
2012	Ireland U19	2	(0)
2013–2014	Ireland U20	5	(0)
2020	Ireland	6	(0)
- Correct as of 31 July 2024

Ed Byrne (born 9 September 1993) is an Irish rugby union player who formerly played for Leinster and Cardiff in the United Rugby Championship. His preferred position is loosehead prop. In April 2015 he was awarded a senior contract with Leinster following completion of his time in the academy, having previously played with the Leinster senior team, making his debut in February 2014 against Zebre.

In October 2020, he was named in the Ireland squad by coach Andy Farrell for the remaining matches of the 2020 Six Nations Championship. He made his debut as a substitute against Italy on 24 October 2020.

On 8 May 2024, Byyne would leave Leinster to travel to Wales to sign with capital region Cardiff for the 2024-25 season. He rejoined Leinster on a short term loan in April 2026, and was released by Cardiff at the end of the 2025-26 season.
