= Dan Evans (rugby union) =

Welsh rugby player

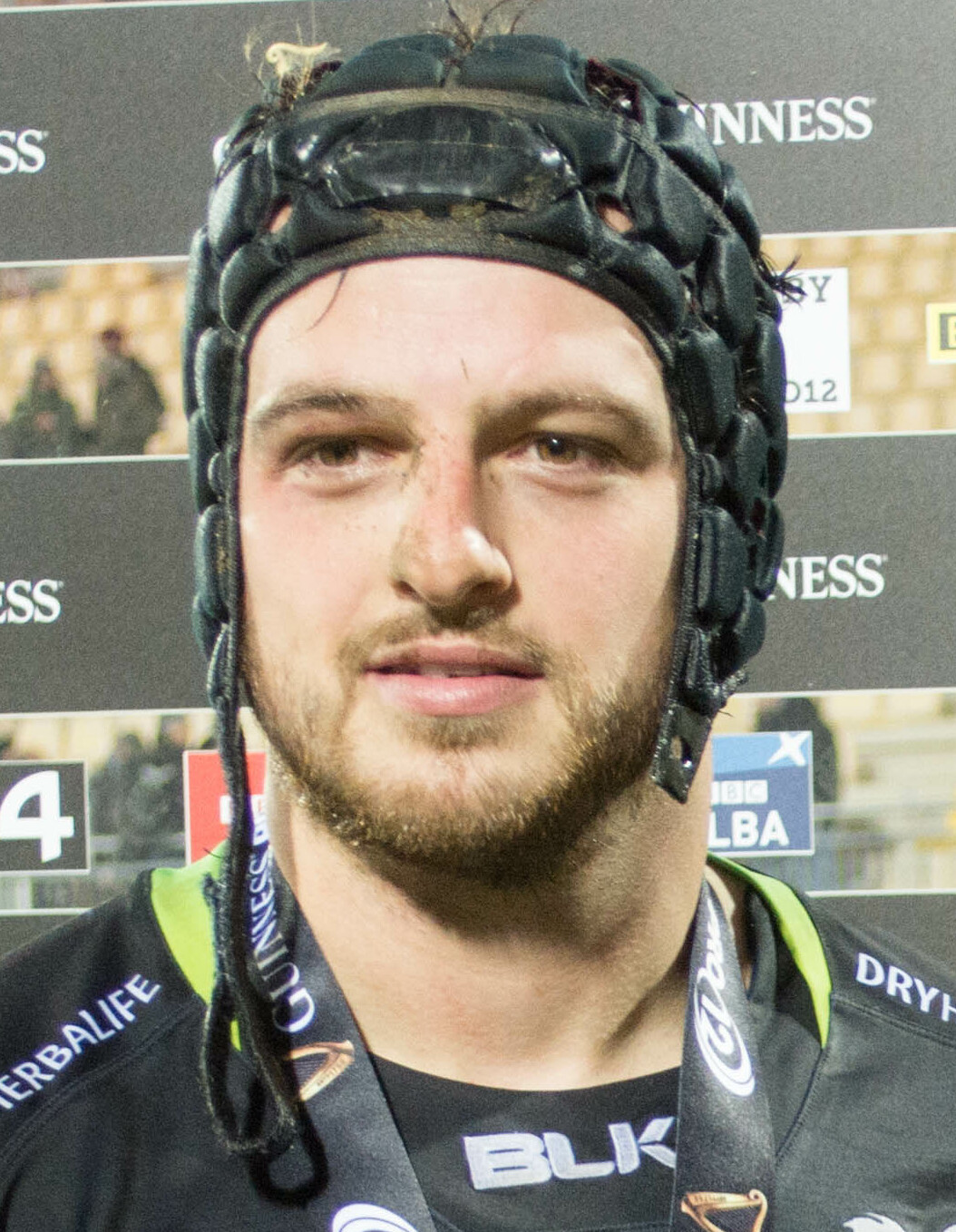
- Born: Daniel James Evans; 15 November 1988 (age 37) Swansea, Wales
- Height: 6 ft 0 in (183 cm)
- Weight: 14 st 9 lb (93 kg)
- School: Amman Valley Comprehensive
- University: Trinity College, Carmarthen

Rugby union career
Senior career
Years	Team	Apps	(Points)
2006–2012	Llanelli RFC	54	(298)
2010–2012	Carmarthen Quins	12	(54)
- Correct as of 11 March 2016
Provincial / State sides
Years	Team	Apps	(Points)
2006–2012	Scarlets	74	(83)
2012–2014	Newport Gwent Dragons	48	(69)
2014–2024	Ospreys	134	(225)
- Correct as of 11 April 2019
International career
Years	Team	Apps	(Points)
- Wales U20
2009	Wales	2	(0)
- Correct as of 23:44, 6 December 2015 (UTC)

Daniel Evans (born 15 November 1988) is a former Welsh rugby union player who played as a full-back.

== Career ==
Evans was part of the Scarlets U16 team that formed part of an age grade clean sweep for the region in the inaugural season of the Reebok Regional Championships, and was part of the Scarlets U18 team that lost to the Ospreys in the U18 Final the following season. During the 2006–07 season, Evans turned out for the Scarlets U20 at fullback as they finished third in the Championship.

Evans was a regular performer for Llanelli RFC scoring a try in the Welsh Cup quarter-final against Pontypridd as Llanelli knocked the holders out to make their way through to the semi-finals.

In the following season, he was man-of-the-match in the Scarlets' 26–24 defeat of London Irish away, scoring a try that many believed would put him in the frame for a Wales recall in the Autumn. However, he missed out on selection, and again in the 2010 Six Nations.

In May 2012 Evans joined Newport Gwent Dragons Evans joined the Ospreys for the 2014–15 season.

Evans is a fluent Welsh speaker.

== International career ==
Evans was selected for Wales at U18 level, participating in the 2005–06 season's Home Four Nations Championship. The 2006–07 season saw Evans called up to the Wales U19 squad for their spring internationals and subsequent IRB U19 World Championship bid. He played in all five of Wales' tournament matches, slotting a conversion over in the opening pool game against New Zealand U19. During the 2007–08 season he was selected for the Wales U20 squad to play in the 2008 U20 Six Nations and the 2008 Junior World Championships, he scored his only U20 try against Scotland U20 in a 27–10 win. In May 2009, Evans was called up to the senior Wales squad for the summer tour of North America. Evans appeared in both tour matches and made his Wales debut in the 32–23 win over Canada on 30 May 2009.
