= Conor O'Brien (rugby union) =

Irish rugby union player (born 1996)

- Born: Conor O'Brien; 6 February 1996 (age 30) Mullingar, Ireland
- Height: 1.91 m (6 ft 3 in)
- Weight: 103 kg (16 st 3 lb; 227 lb)
- University: Trinity College Dublin

Rugby union career
- Position(s): Centre, Wing, Fly-half
Youth career
- Mullingar
Amateur team(s)
Years	Team	Apps	(Points)
- Trinity
–	Clontarf		
Senior career
Years	Team	Apps	(Points)
2017–2022	Leinster	28	(30)
- Correct as of 30 June 2022
International career
Years	Team	Apps	(Points)
2016	Ireland U20	9	(0)
- Correct as of 25 June 2016

Conor O'Brien (born 2 February 1996) is an Irish former rugby union player who played for Leinster.

== GAA and family ==
Growing up in Westmeath, O'Brien played more Gaelic sports than rugby union until well into his teens. He represented Westmeath at hurling up to under-16 level, and represented Westmeath in Gaelic football all the way to Minor level. His father Garrett was captain of the Offaly team which won the 1988 All-Ireland Under-21 Football Championship, the only such victory in the county's history. Conor got into rugby by playing youths rugby for Mullingar RFC.

== Early rugby career ==
Conor took up rugby as an 11 year with Mullingar RFC, he tried out many positions including back-row before finally settling at out-half. Conor was part of the successful Midlands team that won the Shane Horgan Cup in 2012, in the same season he also played out-half in the Mullingar U17 team that won the Culliton Cup scoring two tries in the final against Navan. He was the out-half on the Leinster U18 team that won the interprovincial title in 2012/13 which lead to his selection for Ireland U18 in four matches against Italy, England, Scotland and France. He was selected on both the Leinster U18 and Ireland U18 teams the following season, this time at centre.

== Leinster ==
O'Brien joined the Leinster Rugby academy ahead of the 2016–17 season, during which he also won an All-Ireland League title with Clontarf. O'Brien is currently in his third and final year of the academy. He made his debut early in the 2017–18 season against Glasgow Warriors, performing well and playing 73 minutes of the match. He made a further two appearances in the 2017–18 season.

== Ireland ==
O'Brien was selected for the Ireland U-20s squad for the 2016 Six Nations Under 20s Championship, where Ireland finished third. O'Brien then starred as Ireland finished in their best ever position of second at the 2016 World Rugby Under 20 Championship, during which they also beat the Baby Blacks for the first time.
