= Jimmy Tuivaiti =

Italian rugby union player

- Born: 2 January 1988 (age 38) Auckland, New Zealand
- Height: 1.85 m (6 ft 1 in)
- Weight: 109 kg (17 st 2 lb; 240 lb)
- School: Massey High School

Rugby union career
- Position: Flanker
- Current team: Zebre
Youth career
- Western United
Senior career
| Years | Team | Apps | (Points) |
| 2012−2014 | North Harbour | 11 | (5) |
| 2015–2018 | Calvisano | 57 | (80) |
| 2018 | →Zebre | 1 | (0) |
| 2018–2022 | Zebre | 40 | (25) |
| 2022– | Valorugby Emilia | | |
- Correct as of 14 May 2022
International career
| Years | Team | Apps | (Points) |
| 2018–2020 | Italy | 6 | (0) |
- Correct as of 9 Feb 2020

Jimmy Tuivaiti (born 2 January 1988) is a former Italy rugby union international. He was born in New Zealand.

== Playing career ==
His usual position is as a Flanker, and he currently plays for Valorugby Emilia. Under contract with Calvisano, for 2017–18 Pro14 season, he named as Permit Player for Zebre in Pro 14. he played also for Zebre from 2018 to 2022. From 2018 to 2020, Tuivaiti was named in the Italy squad.

== Family ==
In 2016, Tuivaiti married Cathrine Latu, the former New Zealand netball international. Together they have two children. Tuivaiti and Latu met when they were both students at Massey High School.
