= Olly Robinson =

English rugby union player

- Born: 21 July 1991 (age 35) Bristol, England
- Height: 185 cm (6 ft 1 in)
- Weight: 105 kg (16 st 7 lb)
- Notable relative: Andy Robinson (father)

Rugby union career
- Position: Openside/Blindside Flanker
- Current team: Cardiff Rugby
Senior career
Years	Team	Apps	(Points)
2012-2014	Moseley	44	(40)
2014–2017	Bristol	52	(122)
2017–	Cardiff	80	(45)
2022	→Leicester Tigers (loan)	7	(0)
2012–	Total	183	(207)
- Correct as of 1 May 2022

Olly Robinson (born 21 July 1991) is a former English rugby union player, who last played as a flanker for Cardiff Rugby in the URC until December 2022.

== Career ==
Robinson was first noticed by Bristol Rugby after putting in sequentially impressive performances while plying his trade for Moseley, and was snapped up by his father, then Bristol Director Of Rugby, Andy Robinson in the summer of 2014. Robinson got his chance at top-flight rugby in the Aviva Premiership, after helping Bristol to promotion. Robinson also captained Bristol at times during this period. After Bristol's relegation back to the Greene King IPA Championship Robinson went on loan to Pro14 outfit Cardiff Rugby, returning from his loan spell to play one final time for Bristol. It was announced, firstly, that Robinson was to make a permanent switch to Cardiff from the end of the 2017/18 season; and then a few days later, that this arrangement came into immediate effect.

On 18 January 2022 it was announced that Leicester Tigers had agreed to take Robinson on loan for the remainder of the 2021/22 season, Robinson played 7 times for Leicester in his loan spell.
