= Josh Lewis (rugby union) =

Welsh rugby player (born 1992)

- Born: Josh Lewis; 22 March 1992 (age 34) Merthyr Tydfil, Wales
- Height: 183 cm (6 ft 0 in)

Rugby union career
- Position: Fly-half
- Current team: Dragons (rugby union)
Senior career
Years	Team	Apps	(Points)
2010-2011	Aberavon		
2011-2013	Ebbw Vale		
2013-2016	Llanelli	36	(353)
2016-2017	Ebbw Vale		
2017–2018	Bath	3	(19)
- Correct as of 9 September 2016
Provincial / State sides
Years	Team	Apps	(Points)
2013-2016	Scarlets	13	(29)
2018–	Dragons	29	(175)
- Correct as of 15 February 2019

Josh Lewis (born 22 March 1992, Merthyr Tydfil) is a Welsh rugby union player who plays for the Dragons as a fly half.

Lewis made his debut for the Scarlets team in 2013 having previously played for Ebbw Vale RFC and Llanelli RFC.

On 28 March 2017, Lewis signs for Aviva Premiership side, Bath ahead of the 2017–18 season.

On 15 January 2018, Lewis returns to Wales to sign for Dragons in the Pro14 from the 2018-19 season.
