= 2020–21 Connacht Rugby season =

Rugby Union Pro14 season

Connacht
- 2020–21 season
- Head coach: Andy Friend
- Chief executive: Willie Ruane
- Captain: Jarrad Butler
- Pro14: 2nd, Conf. B
- Pro14 Rainbow Cup: 6th
- Champions Cup: Pool stage (10th)
- Challenge Cup: Round of 16
- Top try scorer: All: Alex Wootton (11)
- Top points scorer: All: Jack Carty (131)
- Average home attendance: N/A
Home colours	Away colours	Third colours

The 2020–21 season was Irish provincial rugby union side Connacht Rugby's twentieth season competing in the Pro14, and the team's twenty-fifth season as a professional side. It was Andy Friend's third season in charge of the side.

In addition to the Pro14, Connacht competed in the European Champions Cup. This was confirmed in August 2020, as the tournament was expanded to 24 teams on a one-season basis. The Champions Cup pool stage finished prematurely after just two rounds. As one of the bottom eight teams at that point, Connacht were entered into the Challenge Cup in the round of 16 where they were beaten by the Leicester Tigers.

== Coaching and management team ==
Note: Flags indicate national union as has been defined under WR eligibility rules. Individuals may hold more than one non-WR nationality.

Role	Name	Union
Chief Executive	Willie Ruane	Ireland
Team Manager	Tim Allnutt	New Zealand
Head coach	Andy Friend	Australia
Forwards Coach	Jimmy Duffy	Ireland
Backs Coach	Nigel Carolan	Ireland
Defence Coach	Peter Wilkins	England
Senior Video Analyst	Simon Kavanagh	Ireland
Head of Strength and Conditiong	David Howarth	Australia
Senior Strength and Conditioning Coach	Johnny O'Connor	Ireland
Academy Manager	Eric Elwood	Ireland

== Players ==
=== Senior playing squad ===
Connacht Rugby Pro14 squad
**Props**: (Ireland) Jack Aungier; (Ireland) **Finlay Bealham**; (Ireland) Denis Buckley; (Ireland) Matthew Burke; (Ireland) Jordan Duggan; (Ireland) Conor Kenny; (Ireland) Paddy McAllister; (New Zealand) Dominic Robertson-McCoy*; **Hookers**: (Ireland) Shane Delahunt; (Ireland) **Dave Heffernan**; (Ireland) Jonny Murphy; **Locks**: (Ireland) Cormac Daly ^{ST}; (Ireland) **Ultan Dillane**; (Ireland) Óisín Dowling; (Ireland) Niall Murray; (Ireland) **Quinn Roux**; (Ireland) Gavin Thornbury	**Back row**: (Ireland) Paul Boyle; (Australia) Jarrad Butler* (c); (Ireland) Cillian Gallagher; (Ireland) Eoghan Masterson; (Ireland) Seán Masterson; (Ireland) Seán O'Brien; (Ireland) Conor Oliver; (New Zealand) Abraham Papali'i; **Scrum-halves**: (Ireland) Caolin Blade; (Ireland) Stephen Kerins; (Ireland) **Kieran Marmion**; (Ireland) Colm Reilly; **Fly-halves**: (Ireland) **Jack Carty**; (Ireland) Conor Dean; (Ireland) Conor Fitzgerald	**Centres**: (Ireland) **Bundee Aki**; (Ireland) **Sammy Arnold**; (Ireland) Tom Daly; (Ireland) Tom Farrell; (Ireland) Peter Robb; **Wings**: (Ireland) **Matt Healy**; (Australia) Ben O'Donnell; (Australia) John Porch; (Ireland) Peter Sullivan; (Ireland) Alex Wootton ^{L}; **Fullbacks**: (Ireland) Stephen Fitzgerald; (Ireland) **Tiernan O'Halloran**
(c) denotes the team captain, **Bold** denotes internationally capped players.^{*} denotes players qualified to play for Ireland on residency or dual nationality.^{L} denotes a player on loan at the club.^{ST} denotes a short-term signing at the club. Players and their allocated positions from the Connacht Rugby website.

=== Academy squad ===
Connacht Rugby Academy squad
**Props**: (Ireland) Charlie Ward **(1)**; **Hookers**: (Ireland) Declan Adamson **(2)**; (Ireland) Eoin de Buitléar **(1)**; (Ireland) Dylan Tierney-Martin **(3)**; **Locks**: (Ireland) Darragh Murray **(1)**; (Ireland) Cian Prendergast **(1)**	**Back row**: (Ireland) Ciaran Booth **(1)**; (Ireland) Donnacha Byrne **(1)**; (Ireland) Hubert Costello **(1)**; (Ireland) Joshua Dunne **(3)**; (Ireland) Óisín McCormack **(2)**; **Scrum-halves**: None; **Fly-halves**: (Ireland) Cathal Forde **(1)**	**Centres**: (Ireland) Shane Jennings (rugby union, born 2001) **(2)**; (Ireland) Seán O'Brien (rugby union, born 1998) **(3)**; **Wings**: (Ireland) Diarmuid Kilgallen **(1)**; (Ireland) Oran McNulty **(3)**; **Fullbacks**: (Ireland) Colm de Buitléar **(4)**
(c) denotes the team captain, **Bold** denotes internationally capped players, number in brackets indicates players stage in the three-year academy cycle.^{*} denotes players qualified to play for Ireland on residency or dual nationality. Players and their allocated positions from the Connacht Rugby website.

== Senior team transfers ==
Unlike most seasons, where the bulk of transfers occur during the summer pre-season the 2019–20 season saw two separate periods of major transfer activity. Many moves scheduled to happen at the end of the season instead took place during the extended hiatus from March to August 2020. Despite these moves technically happening during the previous season, they are included in the transfers listed here.

=== Players in ===
- PR (Ireland) Jack Aungier from (Ireland) Leinster
- PR (Ireland) Jordan Duggan promoted from Academy
- LK (Ireland) Cormac Daly from (Ireland) Clontarf
- LK (Ireland) Óisín Dowling from (Ireland) Leinster
- LK (Ireland) Niall Murray promoted from Academy
- BR (Ireland) Seán Masterson promoted from Academy
- BR (Ireland) Conor Oliver from (Ireland) Munster
- BR (New Zealand) Abraham Papali'i from (New Zealand) Bay of Plenty
- SH (Ireland) Colm Reilly promoted from Academy
- FH (Ireland) Conor Dean promoted from Academy
- CE (Ireland) Sammy Arnold from (Ireland) Munster
- WG Ben O'Donnell from Australia Sevens
- WG (Ireland) Peter Sullivan promoted from Academy
- WG (Ireland) Alex Wootton from (Ireland) Munster (season-long loan)

=== Players out ===
- HK (New Zealand) Tom McCartney retired
- PR (Ireland) Rory Burke released
- PR (Ireland) Peter McCabe to (England) Bristol Bears
- LK (England) Joe Maksymiw to (Wales) Dragons
- BR (Ireland) Robin Copeland to (France) Soyaux Angoulême
- BR (Australia) Colby Fainga'a to (France) Lyon
- BR (Ireland) Eoin McKeon released
- SH (Ireland) Angus Lloyd retiring
- FH (Australia) David Horwitz to (Australia) Randwick
- CE (Australia) Kyle Godwin to (Australia) Western Force
- WG (Ireland) Niyi Adeolokun to (England) Bristol Bears
- FB (Ireland) Darragh Leader released

- Player's name in italics indicates a transfer that took place after the start of the season

== Results ==
=== Pro14 ===
2020–21 Pro14 table
Conference A
	Team	P	W	D	L	PF	PA	PD	TF	TA	TBP	LBP	PTS
1	(Ireland) Leinster (CH)	16	14	0	2	576	285	+291	82	33	14	1	71
2	(Ireland) Ulster	16	14	0	2	469	263	+206	65	34	8	0	64
3	(Wales) Ospreys	16	8	0	8	301	318	-17	34	39	1	3	36
4	(Scotland) Glasgow Warriors	16	6	0	10	335	377	-42	40	47	2	4	30
5	(Wales) Dragons	16	6	0	10	215	394	-79	36	50	2	3	29
6	(Italy) Zebre	16	4	0	12	237	508	-271	22	69	0	1	17
Conference B
	Team	P	W	D	L	PF	PA	PD	TF	TA	TBP	LBP	PTS
1	(Ireland) Munster (RU)	16	14	0	2	413	250	+163	49	26	7	2	64
2	(Ireland) Connacht	16	8	0	8	396	353	+43	53	36	7	6	45
3	(Wales) Scarlets	16	8	0	8	319	333	-14	36	38	3	4	39
4	(Wales) Cardiff Blues	16	8	0	8	265	284	-19	30	32	3	1	36
5	(Scotland) Edinburgh	16	5	1	10	247	344	-97	29	43	1	4	29*
6	(Italy) Benetton	16	0	1	15	252	415	-164	34	53	1	6	7*
* Cancelled fixture: Edinburgh awarded four match points.
If teams are level at any stage, tiebreakers are applied in the following order: 1. number of matches won 2. the difference between points for and points against 3. the number of tries scored 4. the most points scored 5. the difference between tries for and tries against 6. the fewest red cards received 7. the fewest yellow cards received
Green background indicates teams that will compete in the Pro14 Final, and also earn a place in the 2021–22 European Champions Cup Blue background indicates teams outside the play-off places that earn a place in the 2021–22 European Champions Cup; Plain background indicates teams that earn a place in the 2021–22 European Rugby Challenge Cup. (CH) Champions. (RU) Runners-up. (PO) Champions Cup play-off winners.

==== Regular season ====
3 October 2020
17:15

Connacht (Ireland)	28–24	(Scotland) Glasgow Warriors (1 BP)

Galway Sportsgrounds
Referee: Craig Evans

10 October 2020
19:35

(1 BP) Cardiff Blues (Wales)	29–7	(Ireland) Connacht

Rodney Parade
Referee: Gianluca Gnecchi

25 October 2020
19:35

(1 BP) Edinburgh (Scotland)	26–37	(Ireland) Connacht (1 BP)

Murrayfield
Referee: Adam Jones

14 November 2020
19:35

(1 BP) Connacht (Ireland)	14–20	(Wales) Scarlets

Galway Sportsgrounds
Referee: Sam Grove-White

22 November 2020
15:30

Zebre (Italy)	12–47	(Ireland) Connacht (1 BP)

Stadio Sergio Lanfranchi
Referee: Daniel Jones

4 December 2020
19:35

(1 BP) Connacht (Ireland)	31–14	(Italy) Benetton

Galway Sportsgrounds
Referee: Eoghan Cross

27 December 2020
19:35

Connacht (Ireland)	19–32	(Ireland) Ulster

Galway Sportsgrounds
Referee: Sean Gallagher

2 January 2021
19:35

(1 BP) Leinster (Ireland)	24–35	(Ireland) Connacht (1 BP)

RDS Arena
Referee: Chris Busby

9 January 2021
19:35

(1 BP) Connacht (Ireland)	10–16	(Ireland) Munster

Galway Sportsgrounds
Referee: Frank Murphy

24 January 2021
15:00

(1 BP) Connacht (Ireland)	20–26	(Wales) Ospreys (1 BP)

Galway Sportsgrounds
Referee: Frank Murphy

5 February 2021
19:35

Dragons (Wales)	20–30	(Ireland) Connacht (1 BP)

Rodney Parade
Referee: Craig Evans

20 February 2021
19:35

(1 BP) Connacht (Ireland)	32–17	(Wales) Cardiff Blues

Galway Sportsgrounds
Referee: Andrew Brace

26 February 2021
17:30

(1 BP) Benetton (Italy)	17–19	(Ireland) Connacht

Stadio Comunale di Monigo
Referee: Marius Mitrea

5 March 2021
19:35

Munster (Ireland)	20–17	(Ireland) Connacht (1 BP)

Thomond Park
Referee: Chris Busby

13 March 2021
19:35

(1 BP) Connacht (Ireland)	14–15	(Scotland) Edinburgh

Galway Sportsgrounds
Referee: Chris Busby

22 March 2021
20:00

(1 BP) Scarlets (Wales)	41–36	(Ireland) Connacht (2 BP)

Parc y Scarlets
Referee: Ben Whitehouse

=== Rainbow Cup ===
Pro14 Rainbow Cup
	Team	P	W	D	L	PF	PA	PD	TF	TA	Try bonus	Losing bonus	Pts
1	(Italy) Benetton	5	4	1	0	125	78	+47	14	10	2	0	22**
2	(Ireland) Munster	5	4	0	1	170	75	+95	23	8	3	1	20
3	(Scotland) Glasgow Warriors	5	4	0	1	121	117	+4	17	15	3	0	19
4	(Ireland) Leinster	5	3	0	2	124	87	+37	19	10	2	1	15
5	(Wales) Cardiff Blues	5	3	0	2	124	123	+1	16	16	2	1	15
6	(Ireland) Connacht	5	3	0	2	109	133	–24	15	18	2	0	14
7	(Wales) Scarlets	5	1	2	2	110	115	–5	13	15	2	1	13*
8	(Wales) Ospreys	5	2	1	2	103	88	+15	14	11	2	1	11**
9	(Scotland) Edinburgh	5	1	1	3	126	140	–14	18	19	2	2	10
10	(Ireland) Ulster	5	1	1	3	85	116	–31	12	18	2	2	8*
11	(Wales) Dragons	5	1	0	4	117	156	–39	14	22	2	1	7
12	(Italy) Zebre	5	0	0	5	88	174	-86	10	23	0	3	3
* Cancelled fixture: Scarlets awarded four match points. ** Cancelled fixture: Benetton awarded four match points.
If teams are level at any stage, tiebreakers are applied in the following order: 1. number of matches won; 2. the difference between points for and points against; 3. the number of tries scored; 4. the most points scored; 5. the difference between tries for and tries against; 6. the fewest red cards received; 7. the fewest yellow cards received.
Green background (row 1) is the play-off places and earn a place in the final against the 1st placed Rainbow Cup SA team.

==== League stage ====
23 April 2021
20:15

(2 BP) Ulster (Ireland)	24–26	(Ireland) Connacht (1 BP)

Ravenhill Stadium
Referee: Andrew Brace

8 May 2021
19:35

Connacht (Ireland)	21–50	(Ireland) Leinster (1 BP)

Galway Sportsgrounds

14 May 2021
18:00

(1 BP) Munster (Ireland)	20–24	(Ireland) Connacht

Thomond Park

29 May 2021
18:15

Benetton (Italy)	20–12	(Ireland) Connacht

Stadio Comunale di Monigo

4 June 2021
18:00

(1 BP) Connacht (Ireland)	26–19	(Wales) Ospreys (1 BP)

The Sportsground

=== Champions Cup ===
==== Pool B ====
Team	P	W	D	L	PF	PA	Diff	TF	TA	TB	LB	Pts
(France) Lyon	2	2	0	0	83	10	+73	12	1	1	0	10
(France) Racing 92	2	2	0	0	75	29	+46	11	4	2	0	10
(France) Toulouse	2	2	0	0	57	22	+35	8	3	2	0	10
(Ireland) Munster	2	2	0	0	60	38	+22	5	5	0	0	8
(France) Clermont	2	1	0	1	82	77	+5	11	8	2	0	6
(England) Bristol Bears	2	1	0	1	65	69	-4	9	9	2	0	6
(England) Exeter Chiefs	2	1	0	1	42	28	+14	6	4	1	0	5
(England) Gloucester	2	1	0	1	48	89	-41	6	12	1	0	5
(Ireland) Ulster	2	0	0	2	56	67	-11	7	9	1	2	3
(Ireland) Connacht	2	0	0	2	40	53	-13	5	8	0	1	1
(England) Harlequins	2	0	0	2	14	70	-56	2	9	0	0	0
(Scotland) Glasgow Warriors	2	0	0	2	0	70	-70	0	10	0	0	0

13 December 2020
16:15

(1 BP) Racing 92 (France)	26–22	(Ireland) Connacht (1 BP)
Try: Colombe 6' c Beale 17' c Taofifénua 24' m Bird 51' c Con: Machenaud (1/1) 7'; Iribaren (2/3) 19', 52'	Report	Try: Healy 40'+1 m Wootton 62' c Oliver 76' c Con: Daly (2/2) 63', 76'; Pen: Carty (1/1) 12'

Paris La Défense Arena
Referee: Wayne Barnes (England)

20 December 2020
17:30

Connacht (Ireland)	18–27	(England) Bristol Bears (1 BP)
Try: O'Halloran 57' c Porch 75' m Con: Carty (1/2) 58'; Pen: Carty (2/2) 40'+2, 67'	Report	Try: Byrne 35' m Holmes 48' c O'Conor 51' c Lloyd 72' m Con: Sheedy (2/4) 49', 52'; Pen: Sheedy (1/1) 79'

The Sportsground
Referee: Mathieu Raynal (France)

=== Challenge Cup ===
==== Round of 16 ====
3 April 2021
20:00 BST

Leicester Tigers (England)	48–32	(Ireland) Connacht
Try: Clare (2) 11' m, 65' c Porter 14' c Moroni 27' m Henry 31' c Wells 73' c Wiese 78' c Con: Henry (2/4) 15', 32'; McPhillips (3/3) 66', 74', 79'; Pen: McPhillips (1/1) 57'	Report	Try: Marmion 6' m E. Masterson 43' c Wootton 56' c Boyle 71' c Con: Carty (2/3) 44', 59'; C. Fitzgerald (1/1) 71'; Pen: Carty (2/3) 23', 40+5'

Mattioli Woods Welford Road
Attendance: 0
Referee: Adam Jones (Wales) (Note: Replaced Pascal Gaüzère who was originally appointed to the fixture but changed to Jones on 26 March)
