= 2019–20 Connacht Rugby season =

Rugby Union Pro14 season

Connacht
- 2019–20 season
- Head coach: Andy Friend
- Chief executive: Willie Ruane
- Captain: Jarrad Butler
- Pro14: 4th, Conf. B
- Champions Cup: Pool stage (4th)
- Top try scorer: All: John Porch (6)
- Top points scorer: All: Conor Fitzgerald (85)
- Highest home attendance: 8,129 v Leinster; 8 November 2019; 8,129 v Munster; 21 December 2019; 8,129 v Toulouse; 11 January 2020
- Lowest home attendance: 4,512 v Cardiff Blues (Note: This excludes the game against Ulster on 23 August 2020, which was officially a home game but played behind closed doors in the Aviva Stadium.); 15 February 2020
- Average home attendance: 6,316
Home colours	Away colours	Third colours

The 2019–20 season was Irish provincial rugby union side Connacht Rugby's nineteenth season competing in the Pro14, and the team's twenty-fourth season as a professional side. It was Andy Friend's second season in charge of the side.

In the regular season, Connacht were placed in Conference B of the Pro14, after spending the previous two seasons in Conference A. As well as playing in the Pro14, the team competed in the Champions Cup in Europe on the back of the previous season's league performance. They were drawn into pool 5 with Gloucester, Montpellier and Toulouse, and finished bottom of the table. In addition to the league and European competitions, the Connacht Eagles development side again competed in the Celtic Cup. The Eagles finished third in the regular season of the eight-team competition, just two points behind finalists Ulster A.

On 12 March 2020, with 13 of Connacht's 21 fixtures in the regular season of the Pro14 completed, the league was put on indefinite hiatus due to the coronavirus pandemic. The competition resumed in August, with the remaining fixtures replaced by two rounds of derby games for each team. Connacht ultimately finished fourth in their conference. This was enough to earn entry to the 2020–21 Champions Cup after it was expanded to 24 teams on a one-season basis due to the pandemic.

== Coaching and management team ==
Note: Flags indicate national union as has been defined under WR eligibility rules. Individuals may hold more than one non-WR nationality.

Role	Name	Union
Chief Executive	Willie Ruane	Ireland
Team Manager	Tim Allnutt	New Zealand
Head coach	Andy Friend	Australia
Forwards Coach	Jimmy Duffy	Ireland
Backs Coach	Nigel Carolan	Ireland
Defence Coach	Peter Wilkins	England
Senior Video Analyst	Simon Kavanagh	Ireland
Head of Strength and Conditiong	David Howarth	Australia
Senior Strength and Conditioning Coach	Johnny O'Connor	Ireland
Academy Manager	Eric Elwood	Ireland
Connacht Eagles Coach	Mossy Lawler	Ireland

== Players ==
=== Senior playing squad ===
Connacht Rugby Pro14 squad
**Props**: (Ireland) Jack Aungier; (Ireland) **Finlay Bealham**; (Ireland) Denis Buckley; (Ireland) Matthew Burke; (Ireland) Rory Burke; (Ireland) Jordan Duggan; (Ireland) Conor Kenny; (Ireland) Paddy McAllister; (New Zealand) Dominic Robertson-McCoy*; **Hookers**: (Ireland) Shane Delahunt; (Ireland) **Dave Heffernan**; (New Zealand) Tom McCartney*; (Ireland) Jonny Murphy; **Locks**: (Ireland) **Ultan Dillane**; (Ireland) Óisín Dowling; (England) Joe Maksymiw*; (Ireland) Eoghan Masterson; (Ireland) Niall Murray; (Ireland) Seán O'Brien; (Ireland) **Quinn Roux**; (Ireland) Gavin Thornbury	**Back row**: (Ireland) Paul Boyle; (Australia) Jarrad Butler (c); (Ireland) **Robin Copeland**; (Australia) Colby Fainga'a; (Ireland) Cillian Gallagher; (Ireland) Seán Masterson; (Ireland) Eoin McKeon; (Ireland) Conor Oliver; (New Zealand) Abraham Papali'i; **Scrum-halves**: (Ireland) Caolin Blade; (Ireland) Stephen Kerins; (Ireland) Angus Lloyd; (Ireland) **Kieran Marmion**; (Ireland) Colm Reilly; **Fly-halves**: (Ireland) **Jack Carty**; (Ireland) Conor Dean; (Ireland) Conor Fitzgerald; (Australia) David Horwitz	**Centres**: (Ireland) **Bundee Aki**; (Ireland) **Sammy Arnold**; (Ireland) Tom Daly; (Ireland) Tom Farrell; (Australia) **Kyle Godwin**; (Ireland) Peter Robb; **Wings**: (Ireland) **Niyi Adeolokun**; (Ireland) **Matt Healy**; (Ireland) Stephen Fitzgerald; (Australia) Ben O'Donnell; (Australia) John Porch; (Ireland) Peter Sullivan; (Ireland) Alex Wootton; **Fullbacks**: (Australia) Will Goddard*; (Ireland) Darragh Leader; (Ireland) **Tiernan O'Halloran**
(c) denotes the team captain, **Bold** denotes internationally capped players.^{*} denotes players qualified to play for Ireland on residency or dual nationality. Italics indicate players signed during mid-season break. Players and their allocated positions from the Connacht Rugby website.

=== Academy squad ===
Connacht Rugby Academy squad
**Props**: (Ireland) Jordan Duggan **(2)**; **Hookers**: (Ireland) Declan Adamson **(1)**; (Ireland) Dylan Tierney-Martin **(2)**; **Locks**: (Ireland) Niall Murray **(2)**	**Back row**: (Ireland) Joshua Dunne **(2)**; (Ireland) Seán Masterson **(3)**; (Ireland) Oisín McCormack **(1)**; (Ireland) Mikey Wilson **(2)**; **Scrum-halves**: (Ireland) Colm Reilly **(2)**; **Fly-halves**: (Ireland) Luke Carty **(3)**; (Ireland) Conor Dean **(2)**	**Centres**: (Ireland) Shane Jennings **(1)**; (Ireland) Seán O'Brien **(2)**; **Wings**: (Ireland) Conor Hayes **(2)**; (Ireland) Hugh Lane **(1)**; (Ireland) Oran McNulty **(2)**; **Fullbacks**: (Ireland) Colm de Buitléar **(3)**
(c) denotes the team captain, **Bold** denotes internationally capped players, number in brackets indicates players stage in the three-year academy cycle.^{*} denotes players qualified to play for Ireland on residency or dual nationality. Players and their allocated positions from the Connacht Rugby website.

== Senior team transfers ==
Unlike most seasons, where the bulk of transfers occur during the summer pre-season the 2019–20 season saw two separate periods of major transfer activity. Many moves scheduled to happen at the end of the season instead took place during the extended hiatus from March to August 2020.

=== May 2019 – March 2020 ===
Players in

- PR (Ireland) Matthew Burke promoted from Academy
- PR (Ireland) Rory Burke from (England) Nottingham
- PR (Ireland) Conor Kenny promoted from Academy
- PR (Ireland) Paddy McAllister from (England) Gloucester
- BR (Ireland) Paul Boyle promoted from Academy
- SH (Ireland) Stephen Kerins promoted from Academy
- SH (Ireland) Angus Lloyd from (Ireland) Clontarf
- FH (Ireland) Conor Fitzgerald promoted from Academy
- CE (Ireland) Tom Daly from (Ireland) Leinster
- WG (Ireland) Stephen Fitzgerald from (Ireland) Munster
- WG John Porch from Australia Sevens
- FB (Australia) Will Goddard from (Australia) Brumbies Academy (short-term loan)

Players out

- PR (Ireland) Conor Carey to (England) Worcester Warriors
- PR (Ireland) Conán O'Donnell to (Japan) Sunwolves
- LK (England) James Cannon to (England) Ealing Trailfinders
- LK (Ireland) Peter Claffey to (Ireland) Terenure College
- BR (Ireland) James Connolly to (England) Nottingham
- SH (Ireland) Conor McKeon retired
- SH (England) James Mitchell to (England) Northampton Saints
- FH (Ireland) Craig Ronaldson to (Ireland) Lansdowne
- CE (Ireland) Eoin Griffin retired
- FB (Australia) Will Goddard to (Australia) Brumbies Academy (end of loan)
- FB (Ireland) Cian Kelleher to (Ireland) Leinster

=== May 2020 – August 2020 ===
Players in

- PR (Ireland) Jack Aungier from (Ireland) Leinster
- PR (Ireland) Jordan Duggan promoted from Academy
- LK (Ireland) Óisín Dowling from (Ireland) Leinster
- LK (Ireland) Niall Murray promoted from Academy
- BR (Ireland) Seán Masterson promoted from Academy
- BR (Ireland) Conor Oliver from (Ireland) Munster
- BR (New Zealand) Abraham Papali'i from (New Zealand) Bay of Plenty
- SH (Ireland) Colm Reilly promoted from Academy
- FH (Ireland) Conor Dean promoted from Academy
- CE (Ireland) Sammy Arnold from (Ireland) Munster
- WG Ben O'Donnell from Australia Sevens
- WG (Ireland) Peter Sullivan promoted from Academy
- WG (Ireland) Alex Wootton from (Ireland) Munster (season-long loan)

Players out

- HK (New Zealand) Tom McCartney retired
- PR (Ireland) Rory Burke released
- PR (Ireland) Peter McCabe to (England) Bristol Bears
- LK (England) Joe Maksymiw to (Wales) Dragons
- BR (Ireland) Robin Copeland to (France) Soyaux Angoulême
- BR (Australia) Colby Fainga'a to (France) Lyon
- BR (Ireland) Eoin McKeon released
- SH (Ireland) Angus Lloyd retiring
- FH (Australia) David Horwitz to (Australia) Randwick
- CE (Australia) Kyle Godwin to (Australia) Western Force
- WG (Ireland) Niyi Adeolokun to (England) Bristol Bears
- FB (Ireland) Darragh Leader released

== Results ==
=== Pro14 ===
2019–20 Pro14 table
Conference A
	Team	P	W	D	L	PF	PA	PD	TF	TA	TBP	LBP	PTS
1	(Ireland) Leinster (CH)	15	15	0	0	531	216	+315	74	28	9	0	69
2	(Ireland) Ulster (RU)	15	8	1	6	385	306	+79	50	40	7	3	44 (Note: Ulster deducted 1 point for administration error regarding Ian Madigan.)
3	(Scotland) Glasgow Warriors	15	8	0	7	364	329	+35	53	42	5	1	38
4	(South Africa) Cheetahs	13	6	0	7	342	280	+62	48	32	5	2	32
5	(Wales) Dragons	15	5	1	9	283	415	–132	32	49	1	1	24
6	(Italy) Zebre	15	3	1	11	230	399	–169	29	56	4	3	21
7	(Wales) Ospreys	15	2	2	11	205	375	–170	21	45	1	4	17
Conference B
	Team	P	W	D	L	PF	PA	PD	TF	TA	TBP	LBP	PTS
1	(Scotland) Edinburgh (SF)	15	11	0	4	391	225	+166	47	27	5	2	51
2	(Ireland) Munster (SF)	15	10	0	5	426	255	+171	53	26	8	3	51
3	(Wales) Scarlets	15	10	0	5	354	274	+80	46	34	5	2	47
4	(Ireland) Connacht	15	8	0	7	302	360	–58	41	48	7	1	40
5	(Italy) Benetton	15	6	1	8	309	350	–41	35	42	5	5	36
6	(Wales) Cardiff Blues	15	7	0	8	283	327	–44	30	38	3	2	33
7	(South Africa) Southern Kings	13	1	0	12	204	498	–294	23	75	0	3	7
If teams are level at any stage, tiebreakers are applied in the following order -: 1. number of matches won 2. the difference between points for and points against 3. the number of tries scored 4. the most points scored 5. the difference between tries for and tries against 6. the fewest red cards received 7. the fewest yellow cards received
Green background indicates teams that compete in the Pro14 play-offs, and also earn a place in the 2020–21 European Champions Cup Blue background indicates teams outside the play-off places that earn a place in the 2020–21 European Champions Cup; Red background indicates teams ineligible for European cup tournaments Plain background indicates teams that earn a place in the 2020–21 European Rugby Challenge Cup. (CH) Champions. (RU) Runners-up. (SF) Losing semi-finalists. (Q) Qualified for Pro14 play-off semi-finals. (e) Cannot reach play-offs.

==== Conference Rounds 1 to 13 ====
28 September 2019
17:15

Scarlets (Wales)	18–10	(Ireland) Connacht
	Report

Parc y Scarlets
Attendance: 6,415
Referee: Stuart Berry (SARU)

5 October 2019
19:35

(1 BP) Connacht (Ireland)	41–5	(Italy) Benetton
	Report

Galway Sportsgrounds
Attendance: 4,839
Referee: Rasta Rasivhenge (SARU)

11 October 2019
19:35

Dragons (Wales)	14–38	(Ireland) Connacht (1 BP)
	Report

Rodney Parade
Attendance: 3,257
Referee: Marius Mitrea (FIR)

26 October 2019
17:15

(1 BP) Connacht (Ireland)	24–22	(South Africa) Cheetahs (1 BP)
	Report

Galway Sportsgrounds
Attendance: 4,945
Referee: Ben Whitehouse (WRU)

2 November 2019
17:15

Ospreys (Wales)	10–20	(Ireland) Connacht
	Report

Liberty Stadium
Attendance: 5,726
Referee: Marius Mitrea (FIR)

8 November 2019
19:35

Connacht (Ireland)	11–42	(Ireland) Leinster (1 BP)
	Report

Galway Sportsgrounds
Attendance: 8,129
Referee: Sean Gallagher (IRFU)

30 November 2019
17:15

(1 BP) Connacht (Ireland)	24–12	(South Africa) Southern Kings
	Report

Galway Sportsgrounds
Attendance: 5,146
Referee: Ben Whitehouse (WRU)

21 December 2019
17:15

(1 BP) Connacht (Ireland)	14–19	(Ireland) Munster
	Report

Galway Sportsgrounds
Attendance: 8,129
Referee: Andrew Brace (IRFU)

27 December 2019
19:35

(1 BP) Ulster (Ireland)	35–3	(Ireland) Connacht
	Report

Kingspan Stadium
Attendance: 17,483
Referee: Sean Gallagher (IRFU)

4 January 2020
17:30

(1 BP) Leinster (Ireland)	54–7	(Ireland) Connacht
	Report

RDS Arena
Attendance: 18,300
Referee: Mike Adamson (SRU)

15 February 2020
19:35

(1 BP) Connacht (Ireland)	29–0	(Wales) Cardiff Blues
	Report

Galway Sportsgrounds
Attendance: 4,512
Referee: Stuart Berry (SARU)

21 February 2020
19:35

(1 BP) Edinburgh (Scotland)	41–14	(Ireland) Connacht
	Report

BT Murrayfield Stadium
Attendance: 5,367
Referee: Marius Mitrea (FIR)

1 March 2020
13:00

Southern Kings (South Africa)	19–29	(Ireland) Connacht (1 BP)
	Report

Nelson Mandela Bay Stadium
Attendance: 1,500
Referee: Cwengile Jadezweni (SARU)

==== Additional Derby Rounds ====
23 August 2020
16:30

(1 BP) Connacht (Ireland)	26–20	(Ireland) Ulster (1 BP)
	Report

Aviva Stadium
Attendance: 0 (Note: This game was played behind closed doors due to coronavirus restrictions.)
Referee: Frank Murphy (IRFU)

30 August 2020
15:00

Munster (Ireland)	49–12	(Ireland) Connacht
	Report

Aviva Stadium
Attendance: 0
Referee: Frank Murphy (IRFU)

=== Champions Cup ===
==== Pool 5 ====
Team	P	W	D	L	PF	PA	Diff	TF	TA	TB	LB	Pts
(France) Toulouse (3)	6	6	0	0	162	85	77	19	9	3	0	27
(England) Gloucester	6	2	0	4	140	140	0	19	14	3	3	14
(France) Montpellier	6	2	0	4	118	157	–39	12	20	1	1	10
(Ireland) Connacht	6	2	0	4	120	158	–38	15	22	1	1	10

17 November 2019
13:00

Connacht (Ireland)	23–20	(France) Montpellier (1 BP)
Try: Boyle 37' m McCartney 40'+4 m Blade 52' c Con: Carty (1/3) 53'; Pen: Carty (1/1) 15'; C. Fitzgerald 67' (1/1)	Report	Try: Cruden 1' c Bouthier 62' c Con: Paillaugue (2/2) 1', 63'; Pen: Paillaugue (2/2) 22', 46'

Galway Sportsgrounds
Attendance: 6,229
Referee: Matthew Carley (RFU)

23 November 2019
14:00

(1 BP) Toulouse (France)	32–17	(Ireland) Connacht
Try: Bézy 12' c Huget 33' m Kaino 63' c Ahki 80'+1 c Con: Ramos (3/4) 14', 64', 80'+2; Pen: Ramos (2/2) 18', 60'	Report	Try: Farrell 10' c Blade 24' c Con: Fitzgerald (2/2) 11', 25'; Pen: Fitzgerald (0/1); Drop: Fitzgerald (1/1) 49'

Stade Ernest-Wallon
Attendance: 15,100
Referee: Karl Dickson (RFU)

8 December 2019
13:00

(1 BP) Gloucester (England)	26–17	(Ireland) Connacht
Try: Marshall (2) 3' c, 60' m Rees-Zammit 46' c Polledri 63' c Con: Cipriani (3/4) 4', 46', 64'	Report	Try: Porch 8' c Roux 80' c Con: Carty (1/1) 8'; Fitzgerald (1/1) 80'+1; Pen: Carty (1/2) 17'

Kingsholm Stadium
Attendance: 10,875
Referee: Pascal Gauzère (FFR)

14 December 2019
12:45

Connacht (Ireland)	27–24	(England) Gloucester (2 BP)
Try: Blade 29' c Delahunt 76' c Copeland 80' c Con: Fitzgerald (3/3) 30', 77', 80'+ 2 Pen: Fitzgerald (2/2) 14', 59'	Report	Try: Grobler 33' c Atkinson (2) 50' m, 68' m Ludlow 65' c Con: Twelvetrees (2/4) 34', 66'

Galway Sportsgrounds
Attendance: 6,787
Referee: Romain Poite (FFR)

11 January 2019
15:15

Connacht (Ireland)	7–21	(France) Toulouse
Try: Penalty try 10'	Report	Try: Kaino 19' c Marchand 37' c Ahki 44' c Con: Ramos (3/3) 21', 39', 46'

Galway Sportsgrounds
Attendance: 8,129
Referee: Luke Pearce (RFU)

19 January 2019
16:15

(1 BP) Montpellier (France)	35–29	(Ireland) Connacht (2 BP)
Try: Chilachava 3' c N'Gandebe (2) 23' c, 28' c Reilhac (2) 52' c, 77' c Con: Pollard (5/5) 4', 24', 30', 52', 78'	Report	Try: Healy 34' c Porch 36' c Marmion 40'+1 c Godwin 43' m Con: Carty (3/4) 35', 38', 40'+ 2 Pen: Carty (1/1) 57'

Altrad Stadium
Attendance: 9,900
Referee: Matthew Carley (RFU)
