= 2018–19 Connacht Rugby season =

Rugby Union Pro14 season

Connacht
- 2018–19 season
- Head coach: Andy Friend
- Chief executive: Willie Ruane
- Captain: Jarrad Butler
- Pro14: 3rd, Conf. A (play-off quarter-finals)
- Challenge Cup: Quarter-finals
- Top try scorer: All: Matt Healy (8)
- Top points scorer: All: Jack Carty (187)
- Highest home attendance: 8,129 v Leinster; 29 September 2018; 8,129 v Ulster; 28 December 2018; 8,129 v Munster; 5 January 2019
- Lowest home attendance: 4,056 v Zebre; 8 September 2018
- Average home attendance: 5,876
Home colours	Away colours	Third colours

The 2018–19 season was Irish provincial rugby union side Connacht Rugby's eighteenth season competing in the Pro14, and the team's twenty-third season as a professional side. It was Andy Friend's first season in charge of the side.

In the regular season, Connacht were in Conference A of the Pro14. The team finished third in their conference, qualifying for the play-offs for the first time since the 2015–16 season where they were beaten by Ulster in the quarter-final. As well as playing in the Pro14, the team competed in the Challenge Cup in Europe. They qualified as one of the best runners up from a pool including Bordeaux, Perpignan and Sale Sharks to reach the quarter-finals, where they again met Sale. A 20–10 defeat saw the team eliminated in the last eight.

In addition to the league and European competitions, the Connacht Eagles development side competed in two new competitions. The first was the Celtic Cup, which saw them play against other Irish provinces' development teams and sides from Wales. The Eagles finished bottom of the Irish conference the inaugural edition of this tournament. The second competition was the Cara Cup, which involved the Irish provinces and the New England Free Jacks, a newly established Major League Rugby side. The Eagles won both of their games, beating Ulster and the Free Jacks.

== Background ==
Following the removal of head coach Kieran Keane one year into a three-year deal, Andy Friend was hired as his replacement. The team also had a new captain for the season, following the retirement of John Muldoon, the province's most-capped player. In August 2018, Jarrad Butler was named as his replacement.

== Coaching and management team ==
Note: Flags indicate national union as has been defined under WR eligibility rules. Individuals may hold more than one non-WR nationality.

Role	Name	Union
Chief executive	Willie Ruane	Ireland
Team manager	Tim Allnutt	New Zealand
Head coach	Andy Friend	Australia
Forwards Coach	Jimmy Duffy	Ireland
Backs Coach	Nigel Carolan	Ireland
Defence Coach	Peter Wilkins	England
Head Performance Analyst	Simon Kavanagh	Ireland
Head of Strength and Conditiong	David Howarth	Australia
Strength and conditioning Coach	Johnny O'Connor	Ireland
Academy manager	Eric Elwood	Ireland
Connacht Eagles Coach	Mossy Lawler	Ireland

== Players ==
=== Senior playing squad ===
The Connacht senior squad for 2018–19 was: (Note: Tom Daly joined Connacht on loan from Leinster in December 2018 for the remainder of the 2018–19 season.) (Note: Stephen Fitzgerald joined Connacht on a three-month loan from Munster in December 2018, which was later extended to last until the end of the season.)

Note: Flags indicate national union under World Rugby eligibility rules. Players may hold more than one non-World Rugby nationality.

Player	Position	Union
Shane Delahunt	Hooker	Ireland
**Dave Heffernan**	Hooker	Ireland
Tom McCartney*	Hooker	New Zealand
Jonny Murphy	Hooker	Ireland
**Finlay Bealham**	Prop	Ireland
Denis Buckley	Prop	Ireland
Conor Carey	Prop	Ireland
Peter McCabe	Prop	Ireland
Conán O'Donnell	Prop	Ireland
Dominic Robertson-McCoy*	Prop	New Zealand
James Cannon*	Lock	England
Peter Claffey	Lock	Ireland
**Ultan Dillane**	Lock	Ireland
Joe Maksymiw*	Lock	England
**Quinn Roux**	Lock	Ireland
Gavin Thornbury	Lock	Ireland
Jarrad Butler (captain)	Back row	Australia
James Connolly	Back row	Ireland
**Robin Copeland**	Back row	Ireland
Colby Fainga'a	Back row	Australia
Cillian Gallagher	Back row	Ireland
Eoghan Masterson	Back row	Ireland
Eoin McKeon	Back row	Ireland
Seán O'Brien	Back row	Ireland

Player	Position	Union
Caolin Blade	Scrum-half	Ireland
Angus Lloyd	Scrum-half	Ireland
**Kieran Marmion**	Scrum-half	Ireland
Conor McKeon	Scrum-half	Ireland
James Mitchell*	Scrum-half	England
**Jack Carty**	Fly-half	Ireland
David Horwitz	Fly-half	Australia
Craig Ronaldson	Fly-half	Ireland
**Bundee Aki**	Centre	Ireland
Tom Daly	Centre	Ireland
Tom Farrell	Centre	Ireland
**Kyle Godwin**	Centre	Australia
Eoin Griffin	Centre	Ireland
Peter Robb	Centre	Ireland
**Niyi Adeolokun**	Wing	Ireland
Stephen Fitzgerald	Wing	Ireland
**Matt Healy**	Wing	Ireland
Cian Kelleher	Wing	Ireland
Rory Scholes	Wing	Ireland
Darragh Leader	Fullback	Ireland
**Tiernan O'Halloran**	Fullback	Ireland

- Senior 15's internationally capped players in **bold**
- Players qualified to play for Ireland on dual nationality or residency grounds*
- Irish Provinces are currently limited to four non-Irish eligible (NIE) players and one non-Irish qualified player (NIQ or "Project Player"). Connacht is exempted from this under a separate development arrangement.
- Notes:

=== Academy squad ===
The Connacht academy squad for 2018–19 was:

Note: Flags indicate national union under World Rugby eligibility rules. Players may hold more than one non-World Rugby nationality.

Player	Position	Union
Dylan Tierney-Martin (year 1)	Hooker	Ireland
Matthew Burke (year 2)	Prop	Ireland
Conor Kenny (year 3)	Prop	Ireland
Niall Murray (year 1)	Lock	Ireland
Paul Boyle (year 2)	Back row	Ireland
Joshua Dunne (year 1)	Back row	Ireland
Cian Huxford (year 1)	Back row	Ireland
Seán Masterson (year 2)	Back row	Ireland
Mikey Wilson (year 1)	Back row	Ireland

Player	Position	Union
Stephen Kerins (year 3)	Scrum-half	Ireland
Colm Reilly (year 1)	Scrum-half	Ireland
Luke Carty (year 2)	Fly-half	Ireland
Conor Dean (year 1)	Fly-half	Ireland
Conor Fitzgerald (year 1)	Fly-half	Ireland
Kieran Joyce (year 2)	Centre	Ireland
Seán O'Brien (year 1)	Centre	Ireland
Mark Balaski (year 1)	Wing	Ireland
Conor Hayes (year 1)	Wing	Ireland
Oran McNulty (year 1)	Wing	Ireland
Colm de Buitléar (year 2)	Fullback	Ireland

== Senior team transfers ==
=== Players in ===
- HK (Ireland) Jonny Murphy from (England) Rotherham Titans
- PR (Ireland) Conán O'Donnell promoted from Academy
- LK (Ireland) Peter Claffey promoted from Academy
- LK (England) Joe Maksymiw from (England) Leicester Tigers
- BR (Ireland) Robin Copeland from (Ireland) Munster
- BR (Australia) Colby Fainga'a from (Australia) Melbourne Rebels
- BR (Ireland) Cillian Gallagher promoted from Academy
- SH (Ireland) Angus Lloyd from (Ireland) Clontarf
- FH (Australia) David Horwitz from (Australia) Melbourne Rebels
- CE (Ireland) Tom Daly from (Ireland) Leinster (loan)
- CE (Australia) Kyle Godwin from (Australia) Brumbies
- WG (Ireland) Stephen Fitzgerald from (Ireland) Munster (loan)

=== Players out ===
- HK (Ireland) Pat O'Toole to (United States) San Diego Legion
- PR (Ireland) JP Cooney retired
- PR (Ireland) Denis Coulson to (Ireland) Lansdowne
- LK (Ireland) Andrew Browne retired
- BR (Fiji) Naulia Dawai to (New Zealand) Otago
- BR (New Zealand) Jake Heenan to (England) Bristol Bears
- BR (Ireland) John Muldoon retired
- FH (Ireland) Steve Crosbie to (Ireland) Old Belvedere
- FH (Australia) Andrew Deegan to (Australia) Western Force
- CE (New Zealand) Pita Ahki to (France) Toulouse
- WG (Ireland) Cormac Brennan released
- WG (New Zealand) Stacey Ili to (New Zealand) Hawke's Bay
- WG (Ireland) Rory Scholes to (France) Brive

- Player's name in italics indicates a transfer that took place during the course of the season

== Results ==
=== Pro14 ===
2018–19 Pro14 table
Conference A
	Team	P	W	D	L	PF	PA	PD	TF	TA	TBP	LBP	PTS
1	(Scotland) Glasgow Warriors (RU)	21	16	0	5	621	380	+241	83	48	15	2	81
2	(Ireland) Munster (SF)	21	16	0	5	612	348	+264	82	44	11	2	77
3	(Ireland) Connacht (QF)	21	12	0	9	475	394	+81	60	55	7	6	61
4	(Wales) Ospreys (PO)	21	12	0	9	445	404	+41	53	47	6	4	58
5	(Wales) Cardiff Blues	21	10	0	11	497	451	+46	60	58	7	7	54
6	(South Africa) Cheetahs	21	8	1	12	541	606	−65	80	80	9	3	46
7	(Italy) Zebre	21	3	0	18	260	640	−380	35	85	5	2	19
Conference B
	Team	P	W	D	L	PF	PA	PD	TF	TA	TBP	LBP	PTS
1	(Ireland) Leinster (CH)	21	15	1	5	672	385	+287	95	49	12	2	76
2	(Ireland) Ulster (SF)	21	13	2	6	441	424	+17	58	54	6	1	63
3	(Italy) Benetton (QF)	21	11	2	8	474	431	+43	62	55	6	3	57
4	(Wales) Scarlets	21	10	0	11	510	470	+40	68	54	7	5	52
5	(Scotland) Edinburgh	21	10	0	11	431	436	−5	52	59	6	5	51
6	(Wales) Dragons	21	5	1	15	339	599	−260	37	84	1	3	26
7	(South Africa) Southern Kings	21	2	1	18	385	735	−350	54	107	5	7	22
If teams are level at any stage, tiebreakers are applied in the following order -: 1. number of matches won 2. the difference between points for and points against 3. the number of tries scored 4. the most points scored 5. the difference between tries for and tries against 6. the fewest red cards received 7. the fewest yellow cards received
Green background indicates teams that compete in the Pro14 play-offs, and also earn a place in the 2019–20 European Champions Cup (excluding South African teams who are ineligible); Blue background indicates teams outside the play-off places that earn a place in the 2019–20 European Champions Cup; Yellow background indicates the loser of the play-off between the two fourth-ranked European teams in each conference, that earned a place in the 2019–20 European Rugby Challenge Cup. Plain background indicates teams that earn a place in the 2019–20 European Rugby Challenge Cup. (CH) Champions. (RU) Runners-up. (SF) Losing semi-finalists. (QF) Losing quarter-finalists. (PO) Champions Cup play-off winners.

==== Regular season ====
1 September 2018
15:00

(1 BP) Connacht (Ireland)	26–27	(Scotland) Glasgow Warriors (1 BP)
Try: Kelleher 14' c Bealham 21' c Con: J. Carty (2/2) 16', 22'; Pen: J. Carty (4/5) 11', 34', 40', 42'	Report	Try: Seymour 1' m Turner 17' c Wilson 31' m Ashe 64' c Con: P. Horne (1/3) 18'; Hogg (1/1) 65'; Drop: Hogg (1/1) 73'

The Sportsground
Attendance: 5,329
Referee: Ian Davies (WRU)

8 September 2018
17:15

(1 BP) Connacht (Ireland)	32–13	(Italy) Zebre
Try: Boyle (2) 8' c, 20' c Blade 47' m Griffin 59' m Adeolokun 69' m Con: J. Carty (2/5) 8', 21'; Pen: J. Carty (1/2) 2'	Report	Try: Bisegni 78' c Con: Brummer (1/1) 78'; Pen: Canna (2/2) 25', 52'

The Sportsground
Attendance: 4,056
Referee: Lloyd Linton (SRU)

14 September 2018
19:35

Edinburgh (Scotland)	17–10	(Ireland) Connacht (1 BP)
Try: Van der Merwe 25' c Schoeman 55' c Con: Van der Walt (2/2) 26', 55'; Pen: Van der Walt (1/1) 41'	Report	Try: Adeolokun 61' c Con: J. Carty (1/1) 62'; Pen: J. Carty (1/1) 75'

Murrayfield Stadium
Attendance: 5,239
Referee: Ian Davies (WRU)

22 September 2018
17:15

Connacht (Ireland)	33–20	(Wales) Scarlets
Try: Farrell 4' c Kelleher 25' c Adeolokun 74' c Con: J. Carty (3/3) 5', 26', 76'; Pen: J. Carty (4/4) 16', 40', 62', 69'	Report	Try: McNicholl 28' c Prydie 71' c Con: Halfpenny (1/1) 8'; Patchell (1/1) 71'; Pen: Halfpenny (2/2) 8', 20'

The Sportsground
Attendance: 5,839
Referee: Marius Mitrea (FIR)

29 September 2018
17:15

Connacht (Ireland)	3–20	(Ireland) Leinster
Pen: J. Carty (1/1) 2'	Report	Try: Ringrose 40' c Cronin 55' c Con: Sexton (2/2) 41', 56'; Pen: Sexton (2/2) 34', 40'

The Sportsground
Attendance: 8,129
Referee: John Lacey (IRFU)

5 October 2018
19:35

(1 BP) Ulster (Ireland)	15–22	(Ireland) Connacht
Try: Stockdale 23' m Timoney 79' c Con: Cooney (1/2) 79'; Pen: Cooney (1/2) 52'	Report	Try: O'Halloran 5' c Aki 72' m Con: J. Carty (1/2) 6'; Pen: J. Carty (1/1) 67'

Kingspan Stadium
Attendance: 13,109
Referee: Andrew Brace (IRFU)

26 October 2018
20:05

(1 BP) Ospreys (Wales)	22–17	(Ireland) Connacht (1BP)
Try: Giles (2) 1' m, 8' m H. Morgan 51' c D. Evans 79' m Con: S. Davies (1/4) 52'	Report	Try: Aki 64' c Butler 69' c Con: J. Carty (2/2) 66', 71'; Pen: J. Carty (1/1) 12'

Brewery Field, Bridgend
Attendance: 5,122
Referee: Mike Adamson (SRU)

3 November 2018
17:15

(1 BP) Connacht (Ireland)	33–12	(Wales) Dragons
Try: Cannon 23' c Leader 26' m Fainga'a 29' c McCartney 39' c Farrell 69' c Con: Horwitz (3/4) 24', 30', 40'; J. Carty (1/1) 70'	Report	Try: Amos 56' m Basham 80' c Con: Tovey (1/2) 80'

The Sportsground
Attendance: 5,146
Referee: Quinton Immelman (SARU)

25 November 2018
15:00

Southern Kings (South Africa)	14–31	(Ireland) Connacht (1 BP)
Try: Banda 27' c Dukisa 50' c Con: Banda (2/2)	Report	Try: Kelleher 10' c Penalty try 35'; Healy 39' c Boyle 61' c Con: Carty (2/2) 11', 40'; Horwitz 61'; Pen: Carty (1/1) 4'

NMU Stadium
Attendance: 3,207
Referee: George Clancy (IRFU)

1 December 2018
17:00

(1 BP) Cheetahs (South Africa)	17–21	(Ireland) Connacht
Try: Jaer 30' m Dweba 35' m S. Venter 71' c Con: Schoeman (1/1) 72'	Report	Try: Farrell 5' c Thornbury 27' m Con: J. Carty (1/2) 7'; Pen: J. Carty (1/1) 21'; Horwitz (2/2) 57', 64'

Toyota Stadium
Attendance: 3,270
Referee: Dan Jones (WRU)

22 December 2018
19:45

(1 BP) Leinster (Ireland)	33–29	(Ireland) Connacht (2 BP)
Try: O'Brien 11' c M. Kearney 43' m Cronin 69' c Leavy 71' c Porter 80' c Con: Byrne (4/5) 11', 69', 72', 80'	Report	Try: Kelleher 5' m Leader 22' c J. Carty 33' c Blade 47' c Con: J. Carty (3/4) 23', 34', 48'; Pen: J. Carty (1/1) 63'

RDS Arena
Attendance: 16,790
Referee: George Clancy (IRFU)

28 December 2018
19:35

Connacht (Ireland)	21–12	(Ireland) Ulster
Try: Delahunt 12' c Aki 19' c Blade 42' c Con: J. Carty (3/3) 13', 21', 44'	Report	Try: Kernohan 32' c Murphy 67' m Con: Cooney (1/2) 33'

The Sportsground
Attendance: 8,129
Referee: Marius Mitrea (FIR)

5 January 2019
19:35

(1 BP) Connacht (Ireland)	24–31	(Ireland) Munster (1 BP)
Try: Farrell 9' c Kelleher 41' c J. Carty 72' c Con: J. Carty (3/3) 11', 42', 72'; Pen: J. Carty (1/1) 40'	Report	Try: P. O'Mahony 16' c Goggin (2) 24' c, 48' c Carbery 63' c Con: Carbery (4/4) 17', 25', 49', 64'; Pen: Carbery (1/1) 56'

The Sportsground
Attendance: 8,129
Referee: Mike Adamson (SRU)

26 January 2019
17:15

Cardiff Blues (Wales)	8–7	(Ireland) Connacht (1 BP)
Try: Lane 24' m Pen: Shingler (1/2) 11'	Report	Try: Boyle 74' c Con: C. Fitzgerald 75'

Cardiff Arms Park
Attendance: 5,673
Referee: Mike Adamson (SRU)

16 February 2019
17:30

Connacht (Ireland)	25–17	(South Africa) Cheetahs
Try: Farrell 24' c McCartney 45' c Butler 78' m Con: J. Carty (2/3) 26', 47'; Pen: J. Carty (2/2) 16', 72'	Report	Try: Maxwane 10' c Fouché 20' m S. Venter 59' m Con: Schoeman (1/3) 12'

The Sportsground
Attendance: 4,933
Referee: Nigel Owens (WRU)

22 February 2019
19:35

(1 BP) Glasgow Warriors (Scotland)	43–17	(Ireland) Connacht
Try: G. Horne 0' c Swinson 30' c Stewart (2) 38' c, 44' c Nairn (2) 66' c, 72' m Con: Thomson (5/6) 1', 31', 38', 45', 67'; Pen: Thomson (1/1) 16'	Report	Try: S. Fitzgerald 21' m Boyle 61' m Daly 69' c Con: Godwin (1/2) 70'

Scotstoun Stadium
Attendance: 7,246
Referee: Ben Whitehouse (WRU)

2 March 2019
14:45

(1 BP) Connacht (Ireland)	46–5	(Wales) Ospreys
Try: Farrell 1' c Healy 24' c Marmion (2) 29' c, 50' c McCartney 69' c Con: Godwin (4/4) 1', 25', 31', 52'; Pen: Godwin (2/2) 12', 15'	Report	Try: Aubrey 15' m

The Sportsground
Attendance: 5,117
Referee: Marius Mitrea (FIR)

22 March 2019
19:35

(1 BP) Connacht (Ireland)	29–14	(Italy) Benetton
Try: Blade ' c Healy (2) 29' c, 68' m J. Carty ' c Con: Godwin (2/2) 17', 30'; J. Carty (1/2) 80'; Pen: J. Carty (1/1) 63'	Report	Try: Rizzi 37' c Duvenage 55' c Con: Rizzi (2/2) 38', 56'

The Sportsground
Attendance: 5,106
Referee: Mike Adamson (SRU)

6 April 2019
17:30

(1 BP) Zebre (Italy)	5–6	(Ireland) Connacht
Try: Bellini 41'm	Report	Pen: J. Carty (2/2) 5', 21'

Stadio Sergio Lanfranchi
Referee: Ben Blain (SRU)

13 April 2019
15:00

(1 BP) Connacht (Ireland)	29–22	(Wales) Cardiff Blues (1 BP)
Try: Blade 11' c Thornbury 26' c J. Carty 49' c Healy 72' m Con: J. Carty (3/4) 11', 27', 50'; Pen: J. Carty (1/3) 46'	Report	Try: Lane 19' c Turnbull 70' c Harries 79' m Con: Anscombe (2/3) 20', 71'; Pen: Anscombe (1/1) 52'

The Sportsground
Attendance: 6,229
Referee: Mike Adamson (SRU)

27 April 2019
19:35

Munster (Ireland)	27–14	(Ireland) Connacht
Try: Beirne 30' c Haley 36' c Hanrahan 74' c Con: Bleyendaal (2/2) 31', 37'; Hanrahan (1/1) 75'; Pen: Bleyendaal (2/2) 20', 56'	Report	Try: Bealham 23'; McKeon 70' c Con: Dean (2/2) 24', 70'

Thomond Park
Attendance: 19,999
Referee: Frank Murphy (IRFU)

==== Play-offs ====
4 May 2019
17:35

Ulster (Ireland)	21–13	(Ireland) Connacht
Try: Timoney 14' m Coetzee 77' c Con: Burns (1/1) 78'; Pen: Cooney (3/3) 4', 40', 61'	Report	Try: Aki 54' c Con: J. Carty (1/1) 55'; Pen: J. Carty (2/3) 29', 67'

Kingspan Stadium
Attendance: 15,215
Referee: Andrew Brace (IRFU)

=== Challenge Cup ===
==== Pool 3 ====
Pos	Team	Pld	W	D	L	PF	PA	PD	TF	TA	TB	LB	Pts
1	(England) Sale Sharks (3)	6	4	0	2	196	108	+88	27	12	4	2	22
2	(Ireland) Connacht (6)	6	5	0	1	146	120	+26	19	14	2	0	22
3	(France) Bordeaux Bègles	6	2	1	3	137	171	−34	17	23	1	1	12
4	(France) Perpignan	6	0	1	5	117	197	−80	13	27	0	1	3

Source: espn.co.uk

13 October 2018
15:00

Connacht (Ireland)	22–10	(France) Bordeaux Bègles
Try: Godwin (2) 13' c, 45' c Bealham 66' m Con: J. Carty (2/3) 14', 46'; Pen: J. Carty (1/1) 23'	Report	Try: Amosa 52' c Con: Meret (1/1) 53'; Pen: Meret (1/1) 40'

The Sportsground
Attendance: 4,878
Referee: Mike Adamson (SRU)

20 October 2018
15:00

(1 BP) Sale Sharks (England)	34–13	(Ireland) Connacht
Try: Ashton (3) 36' c, 56' c, 63' c Beaumont 53' c Con: De Klerk (4/4) 38', 54', 57', 65'; Pen: De Klerk (2/2) 19', 27'	Report	Try: Delahunt 30' c Con: C. Fitzgerald (1/1) 32'; Pen: C. Fitzgerald (2/2) 1', 16'

AJ Bell Stadium
Attendance: 4,249
Referee: Ben Whitehouse (WRU)

8 December 2018
15:00

Connacht (Ireland)	22–10	(France) Perpignan
Try: Leader 9' c Aki 19' c Godwin 77' m Con: Horwitz (2/2) 10', 20'; C. Fitzgerald (0/1); Pen: Horwitz (1/2) 44'	Report	Try: Leiataua 65' c Con: Bousquet (1/1) 66'; Pen: Bousquet (1/1) 47'

The Sportsground
Attendance: 5,011
Referee: Karl Dickson (RFU)

14 December 2018
19:00

Perpignan (France)	21–36	(Ireland) Connacht (1 BP)
Try: Farnoux 7' m Leiataua 41' m Fainga'anuku 46' m Con: Jackson (0/3); Pen: Jackson (1/1) 12'; Ecochard (1/1) 59'	Report	Try: O'Brien (2) 19' c, 34' m Heffernan 25' c Healy 67' c Kelleher 68' c Con: C. Fitzgerald (2/3) 20', 25'; J. Carty (2/2) 68', 70'; Pen: C. Fitzgerald (1/2) 40'

Stade Aimé Giral
Attendance: 5,166
Referee: Ian Tempest (RFU)

12 January 2019
15:00

Connacht (Ireland)	20–18	(England) Sale Sharks (1 BP)
Try: Godwin 19' c Mitchell 21' c Con: J. Carty (2/2) 20', 22'; Pen: J. Carty (1/1) 12'; Horwitz (1/1) 71'	Report	Try: Ashton 39' c De Klerk 49' m Con: De Klerk (1/2) 40'; Pen: De Klerk (2/2) 61', 64'

The Sportsground
Attendance: 6,229
Referee: Pierre Brousset (FFR)

19 January 2019
15:00

(1 BP) Bordeaux Bègles (France)	27–33	(Ireland) Connacht (1 BP)
Try: Amosa 23' c Poirot 38' c Serin 48' c Con: Meret (3/3) 24', 40', 49'; Pen: Meret (2/2) 15', 26'	Report	Try: Healy (2) 9' m, 70' c Roux 18' c O'Halloran 34' c J. Carty 77' c Con: Horwitz (2/3) 19', 35'; J. Carty (2/2) 71', 78'

Stade Chaban-Delmas
Attendance: 11,899
Referee: Marius Mitrea (FIR)

==== Pool winners and runners-up rankings ====
Rank	Pool Leaders	Pts	Diff	TF
1	(France) Clermont	30	187	44
2	(France) La Rochelle	24	134	32
3	(England) Sale Sharks	22	88	27
4	(England) Worcester Warriors	22	25	19
5	(England) Harlequins	21	66	23
Rank	Pool Runners–up	Pts	Diff	TF
6	(Ireland) Connacht	22	26	19
7	(England) Bristol Bears	21	159	42
8	(England) Northampton Saints	21	155	42
9	(Italy) Benetton	20	65	23
10	(Wales) Ospreys	13	36	18

==== Quarter-finals ====
29 March 2019
19:45 GMT UTC+0

Sale Sharks (England) (3)	20–10	(6) (Ireland) Connacht
Try: McGuigan 9' c Solomona 14' c Con: MacGinty (2/2) 10', 16'; Pen: MacGinty (2/2) 28', 33'	Report	Try: Godwin 67' c Con: Leader (1/1) 68'; Pen: J. Carty (1/2) 7'

AJ Bell Stadium
Attendance: 4,649
Referee: Mathieu Raynal (FFR)
