= Conor Kenny =

Conor Kenny may refer to:

- Conor Kenny (hurler)
- Conor Kenny (rugby union)
