= Matt Burke =

Matt or Matthew Burke may refer to:

- Matt Burke (rugby union, born 1973), Australian rugby union player who represented the Wallabies from 1993 to 2004
- Matt Burke (rugby, born 1964), Australian rugby union and rugby league player who represented the Wallabies from 1984 to 1987
- Matt Burke (American football) (born 1976), American football coach
- Matthew Burke (born c. 1962), financial planner and Republican candidate for the United States House of Representatives elections in Washington, 2010
- Matthew Burke (rugby union, born 1997), Irish rugby union player
- DCI Matt Burke, character in the television series Taggart

== See also ==
- Matt Birk (born 1973), American politician and former football player
