= Jarrad Butler =

Australian rugby union player (born 1991)

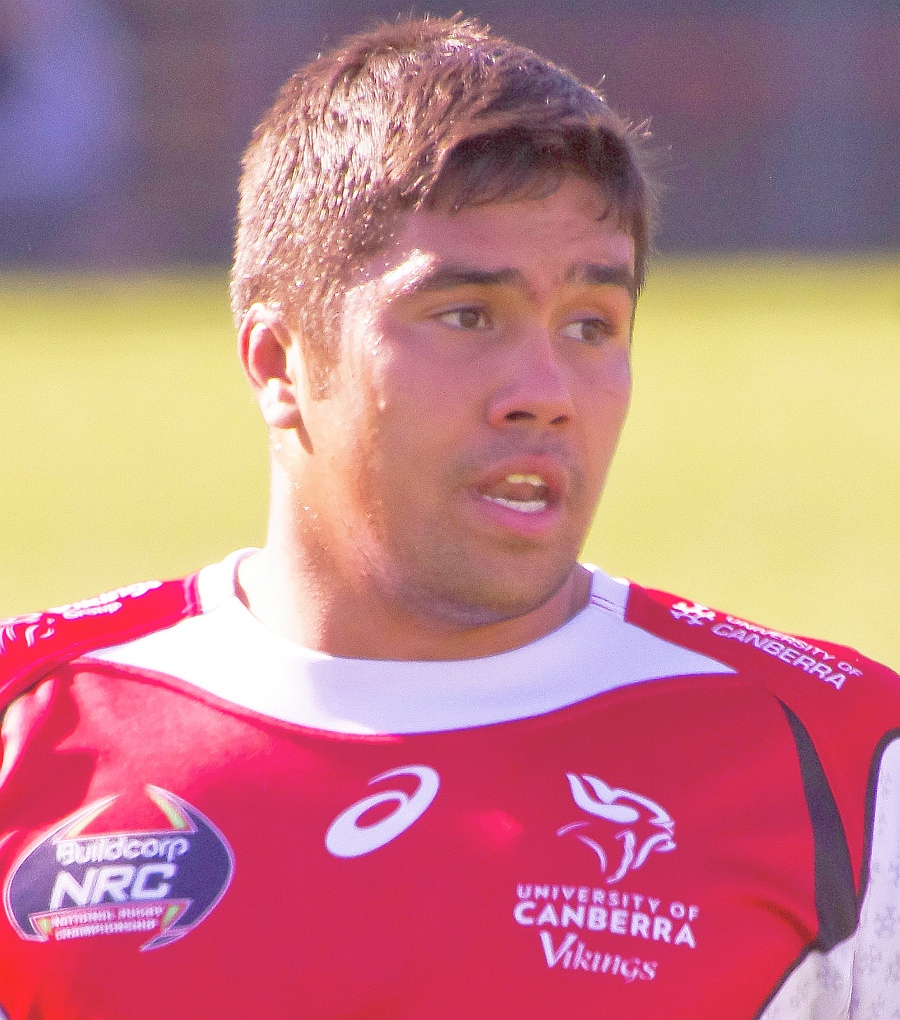
- Born: 20 July 1991 (age 35) Wellington, New Zealand
- Height: 1.86 m (6 ft 1 in)
- Weight: 104 kg (16.4 st; 229 lb)
- School: The Southport School
- University: Queensland UT
- Height and weight correct as of 9 May 2019

Rugby union career
- Position: Back row
- Current team: Galwegians RFC
Senior career
Years	Team	Apps	(Points)
2014–2016	Canberra Vikings	23	(81)
2017–2024	Connacht	129	(45)
- Correct as of 18 May 2024
Super Rugby
Years	Team	Apps	(Points)
2012–2013	Reds	12	(0)
2014–2017	Brumbies	60	(25)
- Correct as of 16 July 2017
International career
Years	Team	Apps	(Points)
2008	Australia schools	3	(0)
2010	Australia U20	4	(10)
2015	Barbarians	1	(0)

Jarrad Butler (born 20 July 1991) is an Australian professional rugby union player. He primarily plays as a flanker but also plays at number 8.

Butler most recently played professionally for Irish provincial side Connacht in the Pro14 and its successor tournament, the United Rugby Championship, spending seven seasons at the Sportsgrounds, in Galway. Before joining Connacht, Butler played in Super Rugby, first for the Queensland Reds for two seasons and then for four seasons with the ACT Brumbies. While playing for the Brumbies, Butler also played for National Rugby Championship side the Canberra Vikings, where he served as captain.

Following his release by Connacht in 2024, he continued to play and began to coach in Galway at All-Ireland League level with Division 2 side Galwegians, winning the 2025-26 All-Ireland League Division 2B title.

Born in Wellington, New Zealand Butler moved to Australia at 13, and has represented the country at under-age level. He played for the Australia schoolboys team in 2008 and the under-20 side in 2010. Butler has also played for international invitational side, the Barbarians.

== Early life ==
Butler was born in Wellington, New Zealand and moved with his family to the Gold Coast in Australia as a 13-year-old. He attended The Southport School on a rugby scholarship. After finishing in school, Butler was part of the national academy of the Australian Rugby Union and also studied part time at Queensland University of Technology.

== Club career ==
=== Reds ===
During the 2012 Super Rugby season, Butler joined the Reds on a short-term contract from the Australian Rugby Union academy to cover an injury crisis. He made his debut as a replacement against the Highlanders on 6 July 2012 at Suncorp Stadium. He played again in the last game of the regular season against Waratahs. Butler's performances in 2012 prompted head coach Ewen McKenzie to name him in the franchise's Extended Playing Squad for 2013. Butler was capped a further 10 times throughout the 2013 Super Rugby season, with all but one of these appearances coming from the bench.

=== Brumbies ===
Butler joined Canberra-based side, the Brumbies ahead of the 2014 Super Rugby season. The move saw him earn far greater game time, starting in all 18 of the side's matches that season, including both knockout games as the Brumbies reached the semi-final stage. Butler scored his first try for the side in the quarter-final win over the Chiefs. The following season again saw Butler feature in all games as the Brumbies reached the semi-final stage, although half of his appearances came as a replacement following the return from injury of the team's vice-captain David Pocock.

In the 2016 season, he featured in 13 of 16 games for the side, starting on all but two occasions. Butler formed a back row partnership with Australian internationals Pocock and Scott Fardy over the course of the season, starting at number 8 alongside the pair in the quarter-final defeat to Highlanders. Butler had a slow start to the 2017 season, with a hamstring injury keeping him out of the opening rounds. He went on to play in a total of 11 games for the season, starting in just four of them. It was announced in July 2017 that Butler would leave Brumbies at the end of the 2017 season. He played his final game for the Brumbies on 21 July 2017 in a quarter-final defeat to the Hurricanes. During his time with the Brumbies, he made a total of 60 appearances, scoring five tries.

==== Canberra Vikings ====
During his time with the Brumbies, Butler also played for club side the Canberra Vikings. With the Vikings, he competed in the National Rugby Championship, a club competition established in 2014. Butler played in seven of the team's eight games in the inaugural season, and scored six tries. In the 2015 season he was named captain, and started all 10 of the side's games as they finished runners up to Brisbane City. Butler retained the captaincy for the 2016 season, where he featured in six games. His departure for Connacht at the end of the 2017 Super Rugby season meant he did not play for the Vikings in the 2017 NRC. He made a total of 23 appearances in his three seasons with the side.

=== Connacht ===
In July 2017, it was announced that Butler had signed a three-year contract with Irish Pro14 side Connacht. He joined the province ahead of the 2017–18 season. He was a regular fixture in the first team for the year, starting in 17 of the side's 26 games and featuring from the bench in a further two. At the end of his first season, Butler was named Connacht's Players' Player of the Year. Following the retirement of long-serving captain John Muldoon in 2018, Butler was named as the province's new captain for the 2018–19 season. He continued to be a regular fixture in the team, starting 19 of the team's 21 regular season games in the 2018–19 Pro14 as they finished third in their conference. He also started in the play-off quarter-final defeat to Ulster at the end of the season.

== International career ==
Born in New Zealand, Butler has represented Australia at under-age level after moving there as a teenager. As a student in The Southport School, he made the Australian schoolboys team in 2008. In 2010, Butler played four games for the Australian under-20 side.

Butler has also played for international invitational side, the Barbarians. He was called up for the team's game against Argentina on 21 November 2015. Butler featured as a replacement in a 49–31 defeat.

== Playing statistics ==
=== Super Rugby statistics ===
Season	Competition	Team	Games	Starts	Sub	Mins	Tries	Cons	Pens	Drops	Points	Yel	Red
2012	Super Rugby	Reds	2	0	2	32	0	0	0	0	0	0	0
2013	Super Rugby	Reds	10	1	9	183	0	0	0	0	0	0	0
2014	Super Rugby	Brumbies	18	18	0	1310	1	0	0	0	5	1	0
2015	Super Rugby	Brumbies	18	9	9	782	2	0	0	0	10	0	0
2016	Super Rugby	Brumbies	13	11	2	874	0	0	0	0	0	1	0
2017	Super Rugby	Brumbies	11	4	7	501	2	0	0	0	10	0	0
Total			72	43	29	3682	5	0	0	0	25	2	0

=== Connacht statistics ===
Season	Competition	Team	Games	Starts	Sub	Mins	Tries	Cons	Pens	Drops	Points	Yel	Red
2017–18	Pro14	Connacht	16	15	1	1172	2	0	0	0	10	0	0
2017–18	Challenge Cup	Connacht	3	2	1	232	0	0	0	0	0	2	0
2018–19	Pro14	Connacht	20	20	0	1535	2	0	0	0	10	1	0
2018–19	Challenge Cup	Connacht	2	2	0	160	0	0	0	0	0	0	0
2019–20	Pro14	Connacht	11	10	1	822	0	0	0	0	0	0	0
2019–20	Champions Cup	Connacht	5	5	0	400	0	0	0	0	0	0	0
2020–21	Pro14	Connacht	12	12	0	928	1	0	0	0	5	0	1
2020–21	Pro14 Rainbow Cup	Connacht	3	3	0	190	0	0	0	0	0	0	0
2020–21	Champions Cup	Connacht	2	1	1	44	0	0	0	0	0	0	0
2021–22	URC	Connacht	16	13	3	1034	0	0	0	0	0	0	0
2021–22	Champions Cup	Connacht	6	6	0	406	1	0	0	0	5	0	0
2022–23	URC	Connacht	12	8	4	686	2	0	0	0	15	0	0
2022–23	Challenge Cup	Connacht	3	3	0	222	0	0	0	0	0	0	0
2023-24	URC	Connacht	11	3	8	418	0	0	0	0	0	1	0
2023-24	Champions Cup	Connacht	3	2	1	164	0	0	0	0	0	0	0
2023-24	Challenge Cup	Connacht	1	1	0	14	0	0	0	0	0	0	0
Total			126	106	20	8427	8	0	0	0	45	4	1
