= Ballinrobe Community School =

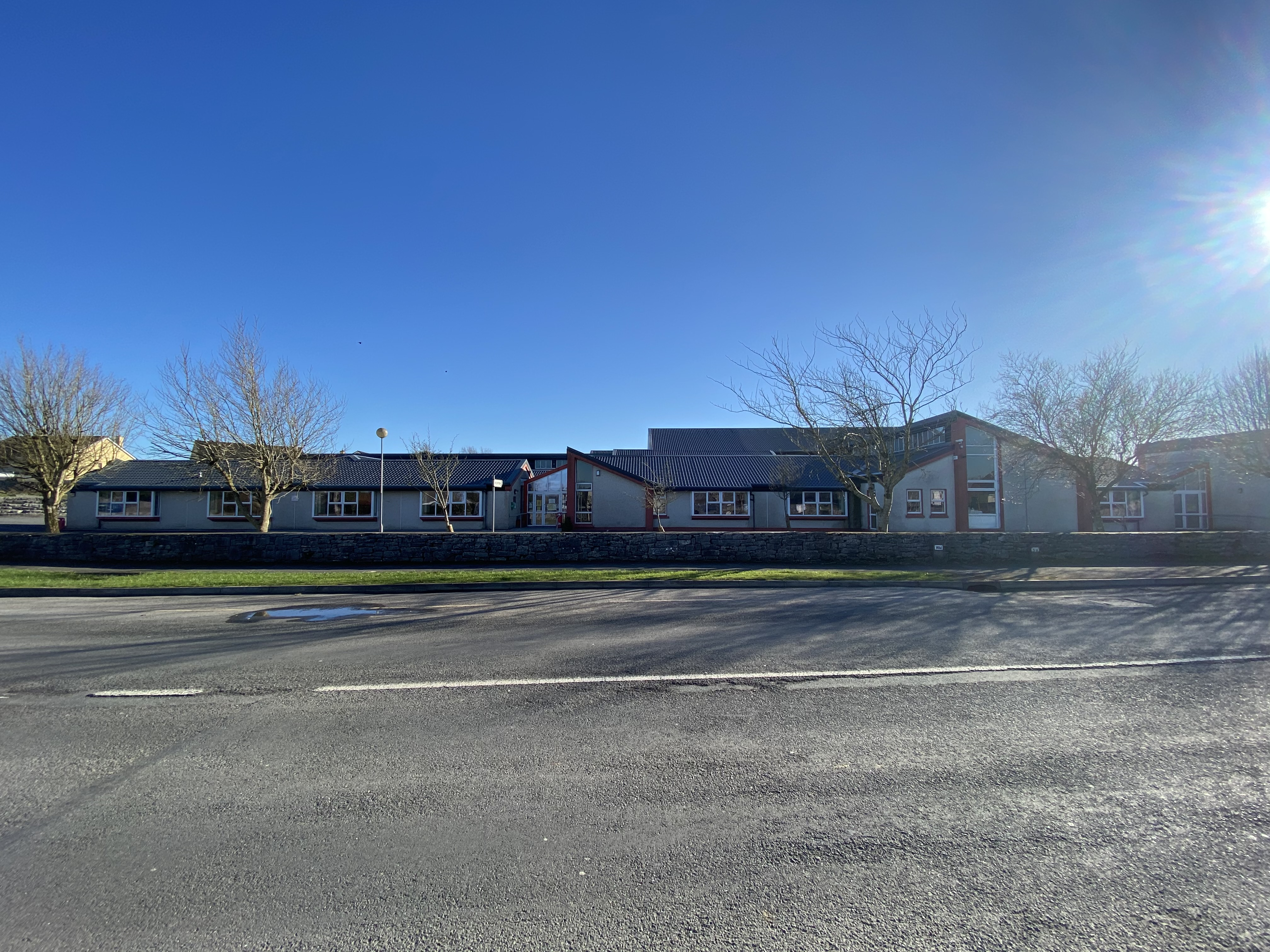

Location
- Ballinrobe Community School, Convent Road; Ballinrobe, County Mayo, F31 XD53; Ireland; 53°37′23″N 9°12′47″W

Information
- School type: Community School
- Established: September 1990
- School code: 91462E
- Principal: Julie Anne Collins
- Gender: Mixed
- Enrollment: 840 (2025)
- Website: ballinrobecommunityschool.ie

Ballinrobe Community School is a secondary school in Ballinrobe, County Mayo. It is a mixed gender school and it was opened in September 1990, after the merging of three second level schools in Ballinrobe. As of 2025, Julie Anne Collins was the principal and 840 students (437 boys and 403 girls) were enrolled in the school.

== History ==
The school was founded after the Sacred Heart Secondary School, the Christian Brothers school and the Vocational school merged in 1990.

In the 1850s, the Sisters of Mercy provided Ballinrobe with primary education, founding the Mercy Intermediate School in 1920 and later founding the Sacred Heart Secondary School.

The Christian Brothers opened a second level school in 1879 and 10 pupils were prepared for the first Intermediate exams held in Ireland in that year.

The Vocational School opened in 1962.

== Academics ==
The school teaches Junior and Senior Cycle as well as offering an optional Transition Year.

Several students in the school have scored the country's top marks in the Leaving Certificate, with one student achieving eight A1s in 2002, and another also with eight A1s in 2016.

== Extracurricular ==
The school offers sporting and extracurricular activities to its students.

The school's Gaelic football team won the 2017 Paddy Drummond Cup. As of 2025, the school's team was competing in the Connacht GAA PPS Senior A Football Championship.

In golf, a team from the school won the Irish Schools Junior Championship in 2013.

== Alumni ==
- Matthew Burke (b. 1997), rugby union player
- Cora Staunton (b. 1981), sportswoman
- Donal Vaughan (b. 1988/1989), footballer
