= Darragh Murray =

Ireland international rugby union player (born 2001)

- Born: 7 April 2001 (age 25) Brideswell
- Height: 2.01 m (6 ft 7 in)
- Weight: 115 kg (254 lb)
- Notable relative: Niall Murray (brother)

Rugby union career
- Position: Lock
- Current team: Connacht
Amateur team(s)
Years	Team	Apps	(Points)
- Buccaneers
Senior career
Years	Team	Apps	(Points)
2022-	Connacht	51	(0)
2024	Ireland U20	1	(0)
2024	Emerging Ireland	1	(0)
2025-	Ireland A	1	(5)
2025-	Ireland	3	(10)
- Correct as of 14 March 2026

Darragh Murray (born 7 April 2001) is an Irish rugby union player who plays for Connacht Rugby as a lock forward.

== Club career ==
Murray is from Brideswell in County Roscommon and started his career playing for Buccaneers. He captained Connacht U18 to the U-18 Interprovincial Championship title in 2018.

== Connacht Rugby ==
Having made his debut for the senior Connacht Rugby team in 2022, he played 16 times for the club in the 2023–24 season. He later also featured for the club in the European Challenge Cup and signed a new contract with the club in 2024.

On the 3rd June 2026, Darragh was named in the URC Team of the Season (Elite XV) for 2025/26, one of two Connacht players selected for this season.

== International career ==
He featured for Ireland U20 in the U20 Six Nations Championship in 2021.

He toured South Africa with the Emerging Ireland team in 2024. He also played for Ireland A prior to a call-up to the Ireland national rugby union team during the 2025 Six Nations, without making his debut. In June 2025, he was called up again to the senior Ireland squad for their summer tour.

In 2025, he was called up to the Ireland Wolfhounds squad for their match against Spain during the 2025 November internationals, and was subsequently named in the starting XV for the match.

In March 2026, he was named on the bench for Ireland's 2026 Six Nations clash with Scotland. He came on as a blood substitute for Tadhg Beirne after 50 minutes and scored his first try in green within less than 10 minutes of coming on.

== Honours ==
- 2025/2026 URC Elite XV

== Personal life ==
His brother Niall Murray is also a professional rugby union player with Connacht Rugby.
