= Éamon de Buitléar =

Irish wwildlife filmmaker, naturalist, musician (1930–2013)

Senator
- In office 25 April 1987 – 1 November 1989
- Constituency: Nominated by the Taoiseach

Personal details
- Born: 22 January 1930 County Galway, Ireland
- Died: 27 January 2013 (aged 83) County Wicklow, Ireland
- Party: Independent
- Spouse: Laillí Lamb (m. 1957)
- Children: 5
- Relatives: Charles Lamb (father-in-law); Colm de Buitléar (grandson)

Éamon de Buitléar (Irish pronunciation: [ˈeːmˠən̪ˠ dʲɛ bˠətʲˈlʲeːɾˠ]; 22 January 1930 – 27 January 2013) was an Irish wildlife filmmaker, naturalist, writer and musician. He was managing director of Éamon de Buitléar Ltd., a company which specialised in wildlife filming and television documentaries.

== Early and personal life ==
He was born on 22 January 1930 in Renmore Barracks, County Galway, one of seven children of Colonel Éamon de Buitléar, an army officer of Clanbrassil Street, Dublin, and his wife Nóra (née O'Brien), originally of Passage East, County Waterford. His father was later an aide-de-camp to the President of Ireland, Douglas Hyde, he grew up in a house of Irish language speakers in Wicklow. He began his working career in Garnett and Keegan's and Helys, selling fishing gear and shotguns. It was there where he first met Seán Ó Riada.

In 1957, he married Laillí Lamb, daughter of the painter Charles Lamb; they had five children.

== Film career ==
For many years in the 1960s he was the only independent film producer, with Gerrit van Gelderen, making wildlife programmes, notably the series Amuigh Faoin Spéir (Irish: "Out Under the Sky") for the Irish television channel, Telefís Éireann. In 1986, his programme, Cois Farraige leis an Madra Uisce, won him a Jacob's Award. His work included directing films based on the Natural World, and he received commissions from RTÉ, BBC and other stations.

He was one of the founding members of the International Wildlife Filmmakers group and whereby Wildscreen Film Festival was born.

In 1987, he was nominated by the Taoiseach, Charles Haughey to the 18th Seanad. He was appointed to the Central Fisheries Board in 2005.

== Musical career ==
De Buitléar was involved in Irish traditional music with Seán Ó Riada and was later involved in the establishment of the traditional music groups Ceoltóirí Chualann (1960–1969) and Ceoltóirí Laighean.

== Memorial ==
A 4 km circular walk Slí de Buitléar or The de Buitléar Way on Bray Head commemorates his life and work, calling out notable flora and fauna in the area. It was inaugurated in May 2014 by his widow Laillí.

== Books ==
- Wildlife. TownHouse. 1985. ISBN 0-946172-04-8.
- Ireland's Wild Countryside. Boxtree. 1993. ISBN 1-85283-401-3.
- A Life in the Wild. Gill & Macmillan, Ltd. (Ireland). 2004. ISBN 0-7171-3615-9. - Reviewed by the Irish Independent
- Irish Rivers. Town House. 1985. ISBN 978-0-946172-05-4.

== Filmography ==
- Amuigh Faoin Spéir – television series (RTÉ);
- The Natural World and The Living Isles (BBC);
- Exploring the Landscape – television series (RTÉ);
- Ireland's Wild Countryside – television series (RTÉ);
- A Life in the Wild – television series (RTÉ);
- Wild Islands (RTÉ, S4C and STV);
- Nature Watch (ITV);
- Éiníní and Ainimhithe na hÉireann (TG4).
