= Paul Dean (rugby union) =

Irish rugby union player

- Born: Paul Michael Dean; 20 June 1960 (age 66) Dublin, Ireland
- Notable relative: Conor Dean (son)

Rugby union career
- Position: Fly-half
Amateur team(s)
Years	Team	Apps	(Points)
- St Mary's College RFC
International career
Years	Team	Apps	(Points)
1981–1989	Ireland	32	(19)

Paul Michael Dean (born 28 June 1960) is a former Irish international rugby union player. He toured Australia in 1989 with the British and Irish Lions and at the time played club rugby for St. Mary's College RFC.

Paul Dean was educated at St Mary's College, Rathmines.

He won five schools international caps in 1977 and 1978 followed by a 'B' cap against England in 1980.

He was out-half on Mick Doyle's Triple Crown-winning squad of 1985.

He scored four tries and a drop goal in his 32 international caps over an eight-year period.

His final appearance was against Scotland in 1989. Dean is currently the manager of the Ireland senior men's international rugby team.
