= Banbridge High School =

Coordinates: 54.345°N 6.277°W

- 69A Primrose Gardens Banbridge; County Down, BT32 3EP; Northern Ireland

Information
- School type: Post-Primary
- Established: 1958
- Principal: Katy Feeney
- Gender: All Genders
- Age range: 11-18

Banbridge High School is a controlled secondary school located in Banbridge, County Down, Northern Ireland. It is within the Southern Education and Library Board area.

The school was opened in 1958 with an initial enrolment of 4200 pupils. A new building was officially opened by the Duchess of Kent in March 1997. In 2002 the school gained a Schools Curriculum Award. The school had a total enrolment of 590 pupils and 148 staff by July 2006. As of 2017, the school has 504 students with 40 teachers. The school's principal is Mrs Katy Feeney and took up the post in February 2021.
