= Alex Wootton =

Irish rugby union player

- Born: 7 July 1994 (age 32) Prestbury, England
- Height: 1.88 m (6 ft 2 in)
- Weight: 97 kg (15.3 st; 214 lb)
- School: Sedbergh School

Rugby union career
- Position(s): Wing, Fullback
Amateur team(s)
Years	Team	Apps	(Points)
- Garryowen
Senior career
Years	Team	Apps	(Points)
2016–2021	Munster	39	(65)
2020–2021	→ Connacht (loan)	22	(55)
2021–2023	Connacht	18	(35)
- Correct as of 21 January 2023
International career
Years	Team	Apps	(Points)
2013–2014	Ireland U20	7	(5)
- Correct as of 24 June 2013
National sevens team
Years	Team		Comps
2015–2016	Ireland 7s		1

Alex Wootton (born 7 July 1994) is an Irish rugby union player for Connacht in the United Rugby Championship and European Rugby Champions Cup. He plays primarily as a wing, but can also play as a fullback.

== Early life ==
Wootton was born in Prestbury, England, though he qualified for Ireland through his father, who was from County Down, Northern Ireland. He began playing rugby aged 7 and moved to Sedbergh School aged 12. Wootton joined the Northampton Saints academy ahead of the 2012–13 season.

== Professional career ==
=== Munster ===
By the summer of 2013, Wootton had moved to Munster and joined their academy. Wootton made his competitive debut for Munster on 24 September 2016, when he came on as a substitute against Edinburgh in a 2016–17 Pro12 fixture. Wootton made his first start for Munster on 1 October 2016 in the Pro12 fixture against Zebre. On 26 November 2016, Wootton scored his first try for Munster in the sides 46–3 win against Benetton at Thomond Park. On 16 March 2017, it was announced that Wootton had signed a two-year contract extension with Munster. In the final of the 2016–17 British and Irish Cup, which was held in Irish Independent Park, Cork on 21 April 2017, Wootton scored a sensational solo try and helped Munster A defeat their English RFU Championship opponents Jersey Reds 29–28 to claim their second title in the tournament.

Wootton scored four tries in Munster's 2017–18 Pro14 fixture against South African side Cheetahs on 9 September 2017, helping the province to a 51–18 win in Thomond Park and earning the Man-of-the-Match award for his performance. In doing so, Wootton equalled the United Rugby Championship record for most tries scored in a single game. He scored two tries in Munster's 36–19 win against Zebre on 26 November 2017. Wootton made his European Rugby Champions Cup debut on 9 December 2017, starting in the Pool 4 fixture against Leicester Tigers in Thomond Park. In his first appearance of the 2018–19 season on 29 September 2018, Wootton scored a try in Munster's 64–7 win against Ulster in round 5 of the 2018–19 Pro14. He signed a two-year contract extension with Munster in December 2018 for the 2019–2021 seasons.

=== Connacht ===
Wootton joined Connacht on loan for the 2020–21 season, and made his debut for the province in their 26–20 win against Ulster on 23 August 2020. Wootton joined Connacht on a permanent basis from the 2021–22 season. Following a strong season in the Championship in which he was joint top try-scorer with 9 tries, Wootton was named to the 2020–21 Pro14 Dream Team. Wootton retired at the end of the 2022–23 season.

== Ireland ==
Wootton played for the Ireland national rugby sevens team during the 2016 Men's Rugby Sevens Final Olympic Qualification Tournament. Ireland finished first in their group with three wins, including a 27–21 win over World Series core team Samoa. However, Ireland lost 12–7 in their quarter-final against Spain and failed to qualify for the Olympics.
