= Jonny Murphy =

Irish rugby union player (born 1992)

- Born: Jonathan Murphy; 6 February 1992 (age 34) Belfast, Northern Ireland
- Height: 1.78 m (5 ft 10 in)
- Weight: 104 kg (16 st 5 lb)
- School: Banbridge High School

Rugby union career
- Position: Hooker
- Current team: Connacht
Youth career
- Banbridge
Amateur team(s)
Years	Team	Apps	(Points)
2013–2017	Ballynahinch		
Senior career
Years	Team	Apps	(Points)
2015–2017	Ulster	6	(0)
2017–2018	Rotherham Titans	23	(10)
2018–2022	Connacht	21	(5)
- Correct as of 15 Apr 2022
International career
Years	Team	Apps	(Points)
2011	Ireland U20	1	(0)
- Correct as of 24 May 2018

Jonny Murphy (born 6 February 1992) is a former professional rugby union player from Northern Ireland, who played hooker for Ulster (2015-17), Rotherham Titans (2017-18) and Connacht (2018-22).

== Early life ==
Murphy was born in Belfast in 1992. He attended Banbridge High School in County Down, and played rugby with Banbridge RFC. He won the Youth Player of the Year award in the 2010 Ulster Rugby Awards. Murphy played with Banbridge until 2013, when he joined Division 1A side Ballynahinch, another Ulster club.

== Rugby career ==
=== Ulster ===
Murphy was involved with Ulster at under-age level. He was identified at the age of 16 and added to a Regional Development Squad. In 2010, Murphy was selected as part of a combined team with Leinster for a challenge match against a combined Connacht/Munster side, the first ever game at the newly built Aviva Stadium.

Murphy signed to an Ulster academy contract for the 2011–12 season. During his time in the academy he played for the province's second tier side, the Ulster Ravens, playing twice in the 2013–14 British and Irish Cup. He spent four years in the academy, before signing a senior development contract ahead of the 2015–16 season. Murphy made his senior debut for Ulster against Scarlets in the Pro12 on 21 February 2016. He did not play again for the senior side in that season, but made five appearances for the Ravens in the 2015–16 British and Irish Cup. In 2017–18, Murphy continued to play primarily in the British and Irish Cup, playing six times in the competition. He made his final Ulster appearance on 10 February 2017, when he played against Edinburgh. He left the side at the end of the 2016–17 season, joining English Championship side Rotherham Titans.

=== Rotherham Titans ===
In May 2018, it was announced that Murphy had joined Rotherham Titans for the 2017–18 season. He made his debut for the side on 9 September 2017, when he came on as a replacement against Doncaster Knights in the Championship. Murphy made a total of 12 appearances in the competition. He also played five times in the 2017–18 British and Irish Cup, scoring two tries. Murphy made his final appearance for the Titans on 10 March 2018, when he played against Ealing Trailfinders. He left Rotherham at the end of the season, returning to Ireland to join Connacht.

=== Connacht ===
It was announced in May 2018 that Murphy had signed for Connacht. He joined the side ahead of the 2018–19 season. He played four seasons in Galway, before being released before the 2022-23 season.

=== International ===
Murphy has represented Ireland internationally at under-age level. He was part of the Irish under-18 club side in 2009 and 2010. He also played for the under-19 side. In May 2011, Murphy was named in Mike Ruddock's Ireland under-20 squad for the upcoming Junior World Cup. He made his sole appearance for the side on 26 June 2011, when he came on as a replacement against Wales.
