= Brideswell, County Roscommon =

Village in County Roscommon, Ireland

Brideswell Tobar Bríde
- Village
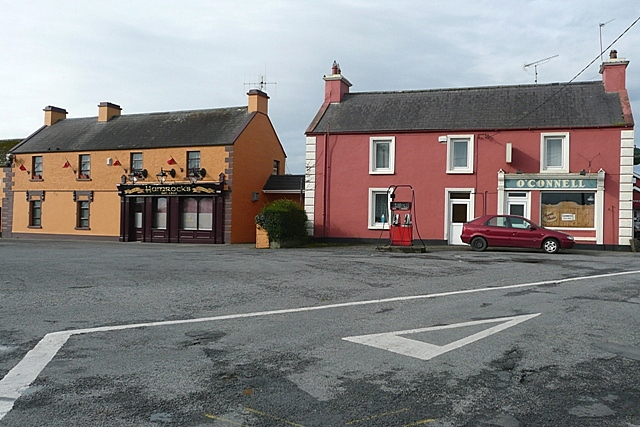
- Brideswell village centre

- Location in Ireland
- Coordinates: 53°27′N 8°06′W
- Country: Ireland
- Province: Connacht
- County: County Roscommon
- Elevation: 62 m (203 ft)

Brideswell (Irish: Tobar Bríde, meaning 'the well of Bríd') is a village in the south of County Roscommon, Ireland, 11 km west of the centre of Athlone.

== Education ==
Brideswell National School is the local national (primary) school, and caters for children from junior infants to sixth class. As of early 2020, there were approximately 50 pupils enrolled in the school. Saint Brigid's holy well is located next to the school.

== Facilities ==
There are two public houses in the village. A post office, which was located at the Eskerbane end of the village, is now closed. Adjacent to the post office there is a Gaelic handball alley, which has fallen into disrepair and is now rarely used. O'Connell's shop has closed down in recent years.

== Sport ==
The nearest sports club to the village is Cam Celtic soccer club, which plays its home matches in the local community centre. The local Gaelic football team is St Brigid's GAA. Handball is also played in the handball alley in nearby Curraghboy.

Gerald "Gerry" O'Malley (1928–2016) was a Gaelic footballer who played as a centre-back for the Roscommon senior football team. There is a memorial to O'Malley in the area.

== Pattern ==
The pattern (derived from the word 'patron' referring to a patron saint) is an annual event held in the village involving a Mass ceremony. This is followed by a festival in the village for the remainder of the day. The event is dedicated to St. Brigid and has been held annually (in July) since the mid 20th century.
