= Niyi Adeolokun =

Irish rugby union player (born 1990)

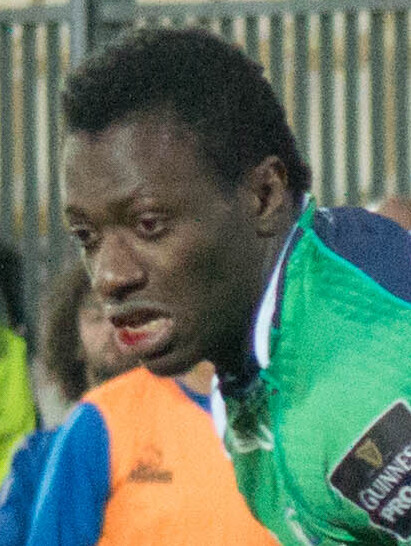
- Adeolokun in 2016
- Born: Adeniyi Adeolokun; 3 November 1990 (age 36) Ibadan, Nigeria
- Height: 1.83 m (6 ft 0 in)
- Weight: 96 kg (15.1 st; 212 lb)
- School: De La Salle College
- University: Trinity College

Rugby union career
- Position: Wing
Amateur team(s)
Years	Team	Apps	(Points)
- Dublin University
- Galwegians
Senior career
Years	Team	Apps	(Points)
2014–2020	Connacht	93	(165)
2020–2022	Bristol Bears	22	(20)
- Correct as of 28 June 2022
International career
Years	Team	Apps	(Points)
2016	Ireland	1	(0)
2018–2019	Barbarians F.C.	2	(0)
- Correct as of 6 June 2021

Niyi Adeolokun (born 3 November 1990) is an Irish rugby union player. He primarily plays as a winger. Currently unattached he most recently played for Bristol Bears and previously for Connacht. Adeolokun joined Connacht in 2014 from Trinity College. During his time with Dublin University, Adeolokun also played rugby sevens for the club.

== Early life ==
Born in Ibadan, Nigeria, Adeolokun came to Ireland with his family in 2001 aged 11. He played a wide array of sports in his youth, playing Gaelic football with Templeogue Synge Street and also played soccer for League of Ireland side Shelbourne's under-20 team. Adeolokun first played rugby union as a student at De La Salle College in Churchtown.

== Club career ==
=== Youth and amateur level ===
Adeolokun was tied with Leinster as a teenager, but after being dropped from their under-19 development squad, Adeolokun played for De La Salle senior school's cup team. In 2009, he was invited All-Ireland League side Dublin University by Director of Rugby, Tony Smeeth. Adeolokun played for the team for four seasons. During his time with the squad also played for the Dublin University Sevens team that won back-to-back All-Ireland Championships in 2011 and 2012.

=== Connacht ===
In June 2014, it was announced that Adeolokun had signed for Irish provincial team, Connacht on a one-year deal. Connacht's academy coach Nigel Carolan had recommended him to the province, with Adeolokun having had a trial with the second-tier side Connacht Eagles, in April 2014.

Adeolokun made his debut for Connacht on 6 September 2014, starting against Newport Gwent Dragons on the opening weekend of the 2014–15 Pro12, providing an assist to teammate Eoin McKeon for Connacht's first try of the new season. He scored his first try for the province against La Rochelle in the 2014–15 Rugby Challenge Cup. Adeolokun played a total of nine games in the league and four in the Challenge Cup in his first season, scoring a try in each. In November 2014, it was announced that Adeolokun had signed a new contract with Connacht to keep him with the team until the end of 2016–17 season.

On 28 May 2016, Connacht won their first ever major trophy, the 2015–16 Pro12 after a 20–10 win against Leinster in the final, Adeolokun scored the second try of the match.

=== Bristol Bears ===
In August 2020 it was confirmed Adeolokun had joined Premiership Rugby side Bristol Bears on a short-term contract for the remainder of the 2019–20 season. He signed a one-year extension ahead of the 2020–21 season.

== International career ==
In November 2016 Adeolokun received his first call-up to the senior Ireland team. He made his debut for Ireland on 12 November 2016, coming as a 67th minute replacement for Craig Gilroy against Canada.
