= Peter Sullivan (rugby union, born 1998) =

Irish rugby union player, large piece

- Born: 22 June 1998 (age 28) Dublin, Ireland
- Height: 1.88 m (6 ft 2 in)
- Weight: 95 kg (15.0 st; 209 lb)

Rugby union career
- Position: Wing
Senior career
Years	Team	Apps	(Points)
2020–2022	Connacht	20	(30)
- Correct as of 4 Mar 2022
International career
Years	Team	Apps	(Points)
2018	Ireland U20	3	(5)
2018–2020	Ireland Sevens	2	(20)
- Correct as of 5 June 2021

Peter Sullivan (born 22 June 1998) is an Irish former rugby union player who played Connacht. He plays in the wing.

== Connacht ==
Sullivan made his Connacht debut against Ulster on 23 August 2020. He was released at the end of the 2021-22 season.

== International ==
Sullivan has represented the Ireland Sevens side in 2 World Series competitions.
