= Niall Murray =

Irish rugby union player

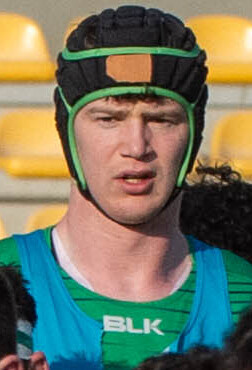
- Born: Niall Murray; 13 October 1999 (age 27) Brideswell
- Height: 2.01 m (6 ft 7 in)
- Weight: 114 kg (17 st 13 lb; 251 lb)
- School: St. Aloysius College
- University: NUI Galway

Rugby union career
- Position: Lock
Amateur team(s)
Years	Team	Apps	(Points)
- Buccaneers
Senior career
Years	Team	Apps	(Points)
2019–	Connacht	92	(35)
- Correct as of 20 March 2026
International career
Years	Team	Apps	(Points)
2019	Ireland U20	10	(0)
- Correct as of 30 June 2019

Niall Murray (born 13 October 1999) is an Irish rugby union player, currently playing for United Rugby Championship and European Rugby Champions Cup side Connacht. He plays as a lock.

== Early years ==
Niall Murray was born in Roscommon, Ireland, then attended St. Aloysius College in Athlone. In his youth, he first played football and Gaelic football until the age of 16, before his mother signed him up for rugby union in the Buccaneers RFC club, although this sport did not suit him initially. However, he progressed quickly thanks to his advantageous physique and represented Connacht on several occasions in the youth categories, notably in the under-18s. He was voted Connacht U18 player of the year in 2017. In April 2017, he was selected for the Ireland under-18 team to play in the U18s International Series which took place in Wales. During the 2017-2018 season, he participated in four British and Irish Cup matches with the Connacht Eagles, the province's reserve team. Two years later, in 2019, he was selected for the first time for the Ireland Under-20 team to participate in the 2019 Six Nations Under-20 Tournament. The Irish won this tournament by achieving the Grand Slam. A few months later, he was called up again with the under-20s for the 2019 World Junior Championship. He also played five matches during the competition.

== Connacht ==
Four years after starting rugby, Niall Murray made his professional debut with Connacht on 14 December 2019, on the fourth day of the European Cup of the 2019-2020 season, against Gloucester. He came into play 10 minutes from the end of the match in place of Joe Maksymiw. Two weeks later, he made his league debut, against Ulster (35-3 defeat). Then, he had his first start at the beginning of January 2020 during a 54-7 defeat against Leinster.

For his first professional season, he participated in seven matches, including three as a starter, before the premature end of competitions linked to the Covid-19 pandemic.

At the start of the 2020-2021 season, he suffered a shoulder injury forcing him to undergo surgery. He therefore missed the first part of the season, before making his return to the field in January 20213. After his return from injury, he played twelve matches, including seven as a starter, without scoring any tries16. During the following season, in 2021-2022, Niall Murray continues to gain playing time and progress. He is one of eleven Connacht players to have played more than 1000 minutes of play. He participated in a total of seventeen of the twenty-four matches played by his team, in all competitions.

In January 2023, he extended his contract with Connacht for two years, until 2025. That season, his province qualified for the quarter-finals of the United Rugby Championship where his team eliminated Ulster, before being beaten in semi-final by the Stormers. This was the second time in its history that Connacht has reached this stage of the competition after 2016. Niall Murray played 17 championship matches including 14 as a starter and scored two tries. He was voted Connacht supporters' favorite player and also won the "try of the year" prize at the Connacht rugby awards. Murray was named to the 2022–23 URC Elite XV of the year.

== Personal life ==
His brother Darragh Murray is also a professional rugby union player.
