= Angus Lloyd (rugby union) =

- Born: 2 October 1992 (age 34) Dún Laoghaire, Ireland
- Height: 1.75 m (5 ft 9 in)
- Weight: 80 kg (13 st; 180 lb)
- School: Blackrock College
- University: Trinity College Dublin

Rugby union career
- Position: Scrum-half
Amateur team(s)
Years	Team	Apps	(Points)
20–2018	Dublin University		
2018–	Clontarf		
Senior career
Years	Team	Apps	(Points)
2016	Ulster	1	(0)
2016–2017	→ Munster (loan)	6	(5)
2018–2020	Connacht	4	(0)
- Correct as of 5 January 2019
International career
Years	Team	Apps	(Points)
2016	Ireland Clubs	4	(0)
- Correct as of 18 March 2016

Angus Lloyd (born 2 October 1992), is a retired Irish rugby union player. He played as a scrum-half.

== Early career ==
Lloyd was educated at Blackrock College, where he played on the Schools Senior Cup team, and then went to Trinity College Dublin, where he played on the universities senior side, winning the colours game against UCD for the first time in his final year in 2015–16. He also played for Dublin University in the inaugural World Universities Cup held in Cambridge in 2015, where Trinity finished as runners-up. During the 2015–16 All-Ireland League, Lloyd was named the Division 1B Player of the Year, and he impressed during a trial with the Munster A squad in early 2016.

== Professional career ==
=== Ulster ===
Lloyd joined Ulster in the summer of 2016 on a development contract. He made his Ulster debut off the bench in the 19–8 victory at home to Scarlets on 16 September 2016.

=== Munster ===
Lloyd joined Ulster's provincial rival Munster on a short-term loan in November 2016. He made his competitive debut for Munster on 26 November 2016, coming on as a replacement for Duncan Williams in the 2016–17 Pro12 fixture against Treviso at Thomond Park. Lloyd's contract with Munster was extended until June 2017. He started against Ulster and scored a try, his first for Munster, in the southern provinces' 22–20 win on 15 April 2017. Lloyd had been a late call-up to the starting XV after Duncan Williams withdrew from the game with an injury.

=== Beaumont Hospital ===
During a short-term hiatus in Lloyd's professional career, he played a pivotal role in securing the 2017 Dublin Hospitals' Cup for Beaumont Hospital.

=== Connacht ===
Lloyd joined Connacht on a short-term contract as injury cover for Kieran Marmion and Conor McKeon in December 2018. He retired from rugby in 2020 to pursue a medical career.

== Ireland ==
Lloyd made two appearances for the Ireland Club XV side in 2016, starting in their 16–12 away win against the France Fédérale side on 12 February, before featuring off the bench in the 13–19 home defeat at the hands of the Scotland Club XV on 18 March.
