= Rory Burke (rugby union) =

Irish rugby union player (1994–2024)

- Born: 27 April 1994 Cork, Ireland
- Died: 9 August 2024 (aged 30)
- Height: 1.83 m (6 ft 0 in)
- Weight: 117 kg (18.4 st; 258 lb)
- School: Christian Brothers College

Rugby union career
- Position: Prop
Amateur team(s)
| Years | Team | Apps | (Points) |
| 20??–2017 | Cork Constitution | | |
Senior career
| Years | Team | Apps | (Points) |
| 2017 | Munster | 1 | (0) |
| 2017–2019 | Nottingham | 30 | (5) |
| 2019–2020 | Connacht | 0 | (0) |
- Correct as of 14 May 2019
International career
| Years | Team | Apps | (Points) |
| 2014 | Ireland U20 | 10 | (5) |
- Correct as of 20 June 2014

Rory Burke (27 April 1994 – 9 August 2024) was an Irish rugby union player. He played as a prop and previously represented Cork Constitution, Munster and Nottingham and Connacht.

== Cork Constitution ==
Having been educated at Christian Brothers College, Cork, Burke began playing for Cork Constitution in the Ulster Bank All-Ireland League and was part of the Con team that won the 2014 Bateman Cup.

== Professional career ==
=== Munster ===
On 29 April 2017, Burke made his competitive debut for Munster when he came off the bench to replace Stephen Archer in the provinces 14–34 away victory against Treviso in Round 21 of the 2016–17 Pro12 season.

=== Nottingham ===
On 16 May 2017, it was announced that Burke had joined English RFU Championship side Nottingham R.F.C. on a one-year deal, which commenced during the pre-season of the 2017–18 season.

=== Connacht ===
Burke returned to Ireland to join Connacht ahead of the 2019–20 season, in a move announced in May 2019. He was released by Connacht in June 2020.

== Death ==
Burke died on 9 August 2024, at the age of 30.
