= Stephen Fitzgerald (rugby union) =

Irish rugby union player (born 1995)

- Born: 13 November 1995 (age 31) Ardnacrusha, Ireland
- Height: 1.88 m (6 ft 2 in)
- Weight: 92 kg (14.5 st; 203 lb)
- School: Ardscoil Rís
- University: University of Limerick
- Notable relative: Conor Fitzgerald (brother)

Rugby union career
- Position(s): Fullback, Wing
Amateur team(s)
Years	Team	Apps	(Points)
- Shannon
2017	Bond University	1	(0)
Senior career
Years	Team	Apps	(Points)
2015–2019	Munster	7	(10)
2018–2019	→ Connacht (loan)	7	(5)
2019–2021	Connacht	8	(5)
- Correct as of 5 June 2021
International career
Years	Team	Apps	(Points)
2015	Ireland U20	8	(25)
- Correct as of 21 June 2015

Stephen Fitzgerald (born 13 November 1995) is an Irish former rugby union player, who played for his native province Munster and Connacht during his career. Fitzgerald played primarily as a fullback, but could also play on either wing, and represented Shannon in the All-Ireland League.

== Early life ==
Born in Ardnacrusha, County Clare, Fitzgerald first began playing rugby aged 7 with Shannon. He attended Ardscoil Rís, Limerick and lost finals at both Junior and Senior Cup level with the school. He represented Munster in all under-age grades, as well as playing Under-19s and Under-20s with Ireland.

== Professional career ==
=== Munster ===
Fitzgerald made his debut for Munster on 13 September 2015, starting in the second game of the 2015–16 Pro12 against Ospreys and scoring a try. On 1 June 2017, it was announced that Fitzgerald had been promoted to the senior Munster squad ahead of the 2017–18 season. He signed a one-year development contract extension with Munster in February 2018.

=== Bond University ===
Having been injured for much of the 2016–17 season, Fitzgerald and then-fellow Munster Academy teammate JP Phelan played for Australian side Bond University Rugby Club in the Queensland Premier Rugby competition. He made one appearance for the side, in round 10 against Sunnybank, but injured his hand and returned home soon after.

=== Connacht ===
Fitzgerald joined Irish province Connacht, where his younger brother Conor was an academy player at the time, on a three-month loan deal in December 2018. He made his debut for Connacht in their 21–12 win against Ulster in round 12 of the 2018–19 Pro14 on 28 December 2018, replacing Kyle Godwin in the 63rd minute. Fitzgerald's loan was extended until the end of the 2018–19 season in March 2019. Fitzgerald joined Connacht permanently for the 2019–20 season.

=== Retirement ===
A knee injury sustained in Connacht's fixture against Leinster in January 2020, for which Fitzgerald underwent three surgeries, forced Fitzgerald to retire from playing rugby at the end of the 2020–21 season.

== Ireland ==
Fitzgerald made his debut for Ireland Under-20s on 13 February 2015, starting against France Under-20s in the 2015 U20 Six Nations and scoring a try. He also represented Ireland Under-20s at the 2015 World Rugby Under 20 Championship, scoring two tries against Scotland Under-20s on 20 June 2015.
