= Jordan Duggan =

Irish rugby union player

- Born: 7 January 1998 (age 28) Newbridge, County Kildare, Ireland
- Height: 1.85 m (6 ft 1 in)
- Weight: 118 kg (18.6 st; 260 lb)

Rugby union career
- Position: Prop
Senior career
Years	Team	Apps	(Points)
2020–	Connacht	72	(0)
- Correct as of 31 January 2026

Jordan Duggan (born 7 January 1998) is an Irish rugby union player, currently playing for URC and European Rugby Champions Cup side Connacht. He plays as a prop.

== Connacht ==
Duggan made his Connacht debut against Ulster in round 14 on the 2019-20 Pro14 on 23 August 2020.
