= Conor Dean =

Irish rugby union player (born 1998)

- Born: 27 January 1998 (age 28) Dublin, Ireland
- Height: 1.68 m (5 ft 6 in)
- Weight: 106 kg (16.7 st; 234 lb)
- School: Blackrock College
- University: Nuig
- Notable relative: Paul Dean (father)

Rugby union career
- Position: Fly-half
Amateur team(s)
Years	Team	Apps	(Points)
20??–	St Mary's		
2016–2017	Leinster A		
Senior career
Years	Team	Apps	(Points)
2019–	Connacht	2	(4)
- Correct as of 5 June 2021
International career
Years	Team	Apps	(Points)
2017–2018	Ireland U20	12	(61)
- Correct as of 5 June 2021

Conor Dean (born 27 January 1998) is an Irish rugby union player who is currently a member of the Connacht academy. He plays as a fly-half.

== Early life ==
Born in Dublin, Dean's father is Paul Dean, who won 32 caps for Ireland between 1981 and 1989, and toured with the British and Irish Lions in 1989 He attended Blackrock College and went on to play for St Mary's.

== Connacht ==
Dean left his native Leinster to join Connacht's academy ahead of the 2018–19 season, and made his senior competitive debut for the province in round 21 of the 2018–19 Pro14 on 27 April 2019, starting at fly-half and converting both of Connacht's tries in their 27–14 defeat against Munster in Thomond Park.

== Ireland ==
Having been selected in the Ireland under-20s squad for the 2017 World Rugby Under 20 Championship, Dean made his debut in Ireland's opening fixture against Italy on 31 May 2017, which the Italians won 22–21, before making appearances against Scotland and New Zealand in the remaining pool games, and against Samoa and Georgia in the play-offs, as Ireland secured a 9th-place finish.
