= Joe Maksymiw =

English rugby union player

- Born: Joseph Mark Maksymiw; 20 September 1995 (age 31) Derby, England
- Height: 2.03 m (6 ft 8 in)
- Weight: 116 kg (18 st 4 lb)
- School: De Lisle College

Rugby union career
- Position: Lock
- Current team: Dragons
Senior career
Years	Team	Apps	(Points)
2014–2018	Leicester Tigers	12	(0)
2018–2020	Connacht	25	(0)
2020–2022	Dragons	30	(5)
2022–2024	SU Agen	41	
- Correct as of 02 Jul 2024

Joseph Mark Maksymiw (born 20 September 1995) is a professional rugby union player from England. He primarily plays as a lock. Maksymiw played for Welsh regional side Dragons in the Pro14, having joined from Irish provincial side Connacht in 2020. Maksymiw then went on to play for SU Agen in France.

Born in Derby, Maksymiw attended De Lisle College in Loughborough. He started playing rugby at age 15 and at 16 was picked up by the Leicester Tigers academy.

Maksymiw made his Leicester debut on 4 November 2014 when he came on as a replacement against the Barbarians at Welford Road. After playing in the Anglo-Welsh Cup, he made his Premiership Rugby debut on 16 September 2017 against Gloucester. He made a total of 12 appearances before leaving the side at the end of the 2017–18 season. On 15 May 2018, Irish side Connacht announced that Maksymiw would be joining them side that summer.

On 1 July 2020, it was announced that Maksymiw had signed a long-term contract with Welsh regional side Dragons

Maksymiw was part of England under 18's tour to South Africa in 2014. He is also qualified to play international rugby for Wales and Ireland. He is a fan of Leicester City F.C.
