= Tom Daly (rugby union) =

Irish rugby union player for Leinster

- Born: Thomas Daly; 31 July 1993 (age 33) Carlow, Ireland
- Height: 1.91 m (6 ft 3 in)
- Weight: 107 kg (16 st 12 lb)
- School: St. Mary's Knockbeg College
- University: University College Dublin

Rugby union career
- Position: Centre
Amateur team(s)
Years	Team	Apps	(Points)
2012–	Lansdowne		
Senior career
Years	Team	Apps	(Points)
2016–2019	Leinster	11	(10)
2018–2019	→ Connacht (loan)	10	(5)
2019–2024	Connacht	69	(73)
2024-	Stade Niçois	16	(5)
- Correct as of 7 May 2025
International career
Years	Team	Apps	(Points)
2013	Ireland U20	7	(65)
- Correct as of 19 April 2020
National sevens team
Years	Team		Comps
2015–16	Ireland 7s		5

Tom Daly (born 31 July 1993) is a former professional Irish rugby union player. At 6'4" and 106-kg (16 stone), he played the centre position. He formerly played for Lansdowne in the All Ireland League, Leinster, Connacht and most recently Stade Niçois.

== Club career ==
Daly featured for Leinster at both u-18 and u-19 youth levels, and entered the Leinster academy in 2013. After three years in the academy, he was awarded his first fully professional contract ahead of the 2016–17 season. He debuted in a November 2016 away win against Zebre, and made nine appearances in the 2016–17 season, mostly as a substitute. In an August 2017 pre-season Leinster match, Daly suffered damage to the ACL in his knee, forcing him to miss almost the entire 2017–18 season.

In December 2018, Daly joined Connacht on a loan deal for the remainder of the 2018–19 season. In April 2019, Daly signed a contract to remain at Connacht.

== International ==
Daly played for Ireland at u-18 and u-19 level. He debuted for the Ireland under-20s in the 2013 Six Nations Under 20s Championship. He also featured in that year's u-20 Junior World Championship for Ireland, earning a total of 6 caps and scoring one try.

Daly was the captain of the Ireland national rugby sevens team. He was on the squad that played in the 2016 Men's Rugby Sevens Final Olympic Qualification Tournament attempting to qualify for the 2016 Summer Olympics in Rio, but the team was knocked out in the quarterfinals of the qualifying tournament by Spain and failed to advance to the Olympics.

In June 2021 he was called up to the senior Ireland squad for the Summer tests.
