= Cillian Gallagher =

Irish rugby player

- Born: 23 July 1997 (age 29) Sligo, Ireland
- Height: 1.98 m (6 ft 6 in)
- Weight: 112 kg (17 st 9 lb)
- School: Summerhill College
- Height and weight correct as of 30 April 2018

Rugby union career
- Position: Lock / Back Row
- Current team: Connacht
Youth career
- 2010–2015: Sligo
Amateur team(s)
Years	Team	Apps	(Points)
2015–2016	Sligo		
2016–2020	Galway Corinthians		
- Correct as of 30 April 2018
Senior career
Years	Team	Apps	(Points)
2017–2021	Connacht	15	(5)
- Correct as of 5 June 2021
International career
Years	Team	Apps	(Points)
2015	Ireland U18	3	(0)
2016–2017	Ireland U20	10	(5)
- Correct as of 30 April 2018

Cillian Gallagher (born 23 July 1997) is a professional rugby union player from Ireland. He primarily plays as a lock, but can also play in the back row. Gallagher currently plays for Irish provincial side Connacht in the Pro14, having come through the team's academy.

A student of Summerhill College in Sligo, Gallagher first played rugby for Sligo RFC in Strandhill. He played for the club through under-age level before joining Galway Corinthians.

== Early life ==
Gallagher was born and raised in Sligo. He didn't play rugby until he was 13, instead playing soccer and Gaelic football. Gallagher joined the Strandhill-based Sligo RFC when he was in secondary school, also playing basketball at this time. It wasn't until under-18 level that he began to take rugby seriously as his primary sport. Gallagher attended Summerhill College in Sligo town, playing for the school rugby team. Despite it not being a traditional rugby school his squad reached the final of the Connacht Senior Cup in 2015, the first time Summerhill had reached that stage. They defeated local rivals Sligo Grammar in the semi-final, but were ultimately beaten 19–18 in the final by Garbally College, with Gallagher scoring a try.

== Connacht ==
Gallagher was involved with the youth setup of his native province, Connacht, from under-15 level. He earned a place in the team's sub-academy at the end of the 2014–15 season. He became part of the full academy in the 2016–17 season. After becoming part of the academy in Galway, Gallagher joined city-based club Galway Corinthians.

While still in the academy, Gallagher made his senior debut for Connacht on 21 October 2017, coming off the bench against Worcester Warriors in the 2017–18 Challenge Cup. His first start came on 9 December 2017 in the same competition, this time against Brive. Gallagher made his Pro14 debut away to Munster on 21 January 2018. In March 2018, it was announced that Gallagher had signed a senior deal with the province, becoming part of the first team squad for the following season.

== International ==
Gallagher has represented Ireland internationally at under-age level. He was selected for the Irish under-18 schools team in 2015 on the back of his performances for Summerhill College. He made two appearances for the side before travelling to the Rugby Europe under-18 tournament, where he was injured in the first game.

Gallagher progressed to play for the Ireland under-20s the following year. He was named in Nigel Carolan's squad for the 2016 Under-20 Six Nations, playing in all five games in the tournament and scoring a try on his debut against Wales. In May 2016, Gallagher was named in the team's squad for the upcoming Junior World Cup. He played in all three of the team's group games including a win over New Zealand, the first time an Irish international men's side had beaten their New Zealand counterparts. Gallagher did not appear in the knockout stages, which saw Ireland reach the final, their best ever performance in the tournament.

Gallagher was one of only three players to return to the team for the following season, and was named in the squad for the 2017 Under-20 Six Nations. He played in the first two games, captaining the side against Italy. Gallagher was injured during the Italy game however, and missed the remainder of the tournament. The injury also ruled him out of the 2017 Junior World Cup.
