= Conor Kenny (rugby union) =

Irish rugby union player

- Born: Conor Kenny; 25 July 1996 (age 30) London, England
- Height: 1.85 m (6 ft 1 in)
- Weight: 128 kg (20 st 2 lb)
- School: Garbally College

Rugby union career
- Position: Tighthead Prop
Youth career
- West Offaly Lions
- Buccaneers
Senior career
Years	Team	Apps	(Points)
2019–2021	Connacht	11	(0)
2021–	Newcastle Falcons	0	(0)
- Correct as of 6 June 2021
International career
Years	Team	Apps	(Points)
2016	Ireland U20	3	(0)
- Correct as of 6 June 2021

Conor Kenny (born 25 July 1996) is an Irish rugby union player who last played for Newcastle Falcons (2021 to 2023). He plays as a prop.

== Early life ==
Kenny was born in London, England, but by 1998 his family had moved to Ferbane in County Offaly, where his father was from. He first began playing rugby with West Offaly Lions before moving to Buccaneers from under-16s onwards. Kenny attended Gallen CS in Ferbane, but joined Garbally College in his fifth year to further his rugby ambitions, winning the Connacht Schools Rugby Senior Cup with school in 2017 after they beat Summerhill College 13–7.

== Connacht ==
He joined the Connacht academy ahead of the 2016–17 season and, after completing the three-year academy cycle, he progressed to the Connacht senior squad ahead of the 2019–20 season. Kenny made his senior competitive debut for Connacht as a replacement in their 20–10 away win against Welsh side Ospreys in round 5 of the 2019–20 Pro14 on 2 November 2019.
