= Eoghan Masterson =

Irish rugby union player

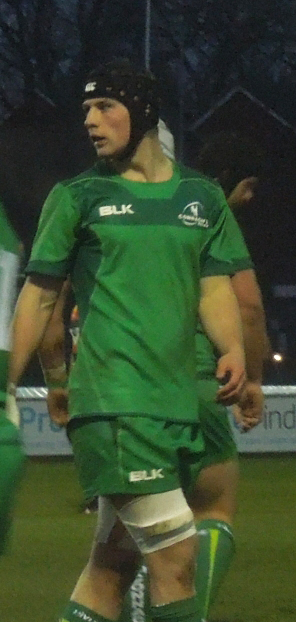
- Masterson, 2017
- Born: 5 April 1993 (age 33) Portlaoise, Ireland
- Height: 1.93 m (6 ft 4 in)
- Weight: 111 kg (17 st 7 lb)
- School: St. Mary's CBS
- Notable relative: Seán Masterson (brother)

Rugby union career
- Position(s): Number 8, Flanker
- Current team: Connacht
Amateur team(s)
Years	Team	Apps	(Points)
–2013	Portlaoise		
2013–	Galway Corinthians		
Provincial / State sides
Years	Team	Apps	(Points)
2013–2022	Connacht	120	(60)
2022–	Aurillac	62	(40)
- Correct as of 4 June 2025
International career
Years	Team	Apps	(Points)
2013	Ireland U20	1	(0)
2013	Scotland U20	5	(5)
2015	Emerging Ireland	3	(5)
- Correct as of 27 May 2015

Eoghan Masterson (born 5 April 1993) is an Irish professional rugby union player who plays for Aurillac. He primarily plays in the back row, though he has played as a lock at under-age level. Masterson previously played for Irish provincial side Connacht in the Pro14, after being promoted from the academy ahead of the 2015–16 season.

== Early life ==
Masterson is originally from County Laois, and attended St. Mary's the Christian Brothers school in Portlaoise. His father, Pat, is Scottish while his mother, Anne, is from Westport, County Mayo. St Mary's had no rugby, but in his youth Masterson played rugby with Portlaoise RFC. He also played GAA with Park/Ratheniska. As a teenager, Masterson was part of Irish midlands representative teams and involved in the youth set up of his native province, Leinster, where he captained the under-18 side.

He graduated with a B.A. from NUI Galway on 17 October 2016.

== Rugby career ==
=== Connacht ===
Having representing Scotland at the 2013 Junior World Cup, Masterson approached Connacht, his mother's native province, for a trial. After impressing head coach Pat Lam and academy director Nigel Carolan in an internal game, Masterson was invited to join the Connacht academy. With the move to Connacht, Masterson also joined All-Ireland League club Galway Corinthians.

After playing for the province's second tier side, the Connacht Eagles, Masterson made his debut for the senior team on 23 November 2013. Just months after joining and while still part of the academy, he started in his preferred position at number 8 against Scarlets in the 2013–14 Pro12. He didn't feature again until 23 February 2014, when he started against Zebre in a 19–27 win, playing as an openside flanker following to injuries to senior players Jake Heenan and Willie Faloon. Masterson then started the following four games for the team, during which Connacht recorded a four-game winning streak, their best in 11 years. He finished the season with a total of six senior appearances, all of them coming as starts.

Ahead of the 2014–15 season, Masterson was made captain of the Eagles and started all six of Connacht's matches in the 2014–15 British and Irish Cup. As in the previous season, injuries to first team players meant Masterson featured for the senior team in the league. He made nine appearances, seven of them starts, and scored his first try for the first team against Newport Gwent Dragons on 22 February 2015, adding two more during the campaign. On 3 April 2015 Masterson made his European debut, starting against Gloucester in the 2014–15 Challenge Cup quarter-final. Masterson also appeared in Connacht's final game of the season, also against Gloucester, in a play-off to qualify for the following season's Champions Cup, the top tier rugby competition in Europe. Connacht were beaten after extra time, by a score of 40–32. During the course of the season, Masterson signed his first senior contract with the province, a deal that lasts until summer 2017.

=== International ===
Having impressed for the Irish midlands team, Masterson was called up for the Irish under-18 club team a year early in 2010. He captained the side a year later. Despite his record with the under-18 side, injury impeded Masterson when the time came to step up to the Irish under-20 team. Masterson made one appearance in the 2013 Six Nations Under 20s Championship, playing against Scotland. After being left out of the Irish squad for the 2013 Junior World Cup he changed allegiance to Scotland, who he qualified to play for through his father, and was added to their squad. He featured in all five of Scotland's games at the tournament, starting in two of them, and scoring a try from the bench against Wales, as Scotland finished 10th overall.

In 2015, Masterson was named in the Emerging Ireland squad for the 2015 Tbilisi Cup. He was used as a replacement for captain Rhys Ruddock in the opening match against Emerging Italy, before starting the matches against Uruguay and Georgia, at number 8 and blindside flanker respectively. Masterson scored a try against Georgia in a win that secured a first-ever title in the tournament for the team.
