= Colm de Buitléar =

Irish rugby union player

- Born: 6 November 1997 (age 29) An Cheathrú Rua, County Galway, Ireland
- Height: 1.83 m (6 ft 0 in)
- Weight: 91 kg (14.3 st; 201 lb)
- Notable relatives: Eoin de Buitléar (brother); Éamon de Buitléar (grandfather)

Rugby union career
- Position(s): Wing, Fullback
Amateur team(s)
Years	Team	Apps	(Points)
- Corinthians Terenure College RFC
Senior career
Years	Team	Apps	(Points)
2018–21	Connacht	4	(0)
- Correct as of 5 January 2019

Colm de Buitléar (born 6 November 1997) is an Irish rugby union player who is a former member of the Connacht academy. He plays as a Centre, wing or fullback, and represented Corinthians in the All-Ireland League. He currently represents Terenure College RFC.

Born in Dublin, Ireland, de Buitléar first began playing rugby for Carraroe-based An Ghaeltacht Rugbaí, a club that was part-founded by his father, Colm Senior , before going on to join Galway Corinthians. His brother Eoin de Buitléar currently plays rugby for Connacht.

== Connacht ==
Whilst still in the academy, de Buitléar made his senior competitive debut for Connacht in their 22–10 win against French side Bordeaux Bègles during the 2018–19 Challenge Cup on 13 October 2018.
