= Willie Ruane =

Irish rugby union player & administrator

- Born: William Ruane; 10 August 1975 (age 51) County Mayo, Ireland
- Height: 1.88 m (6 ft 2 in)
- School: Garbally College
- University: Waterford IT
- Occupation: CEO of Connacht Rugby

Rugby union career
- Position: Fullback
Amateur team(s)
Years	Team	Apps	(Points)
- Galwegians
Senior career
Years	Team	Apps	(Points)
- Connacht
International career
Years	Team	Apps	(Points)
- Ireland Colleges
–	Ireland U21		
–	Barbarians		

Willie Ruane (born 10 August 1975) is an Irish former rugby union player who is chief executive officer of his former team Connacht Rugby. During his playing career he primarily played as a fullback.

== Playing career ==
Ruane played club rugby for Galwegians, and provincial rugby for Connacht. He featured for Connacht in the Challenge Cup in the 1997–98 and 1998–99 seasons, playing in every one of Connacht's games in each season. Ruane retired from rugby at the age of 25 to take a job with Bank of Ireland.

During his career Ruane represented Ireland youth sides internationally, playing for the national sides at Colleges and under-21 level. He also played for the international invitational side the Barbarians.

== Banking ==
After retiring from playing for Connacht, Ruane worked in a variety of roles in different banks in Ireland, including Bank of Ireland, Anglo Irish Bank and Ulster Bank.

== Rugby administration ==
In 2014, Ruane took up his current role as CEO of Connacht Rugby.

== Personal life ==
Ruane was born in County Mayo. He was a pupil at Garbally College in Ballinasloe and received a degree in Business Studies from Waterford IT. Ruane lives in his hometown of Ballina, and is married with three sons, Billy, Tom and Baby Robert.
