= Stephen Kerins =

Irish rugby union player

- Born: Stephen Kerins; 1 May 1996 (age 30) Sligo, Ireland
- Height: 1.7 m (5 ft 7 in)
- Weight: 74 kg (11 st 9 lb)
- School: Summerhill College
- University: GMIT, NUI Galway

Rugby union career
- Position: Scrum-half
Youth career
- Sligo
Senior career
Years	Team	Apps	(Points)
2019–2021	Connacht	11	(0)
2021	→ Bristol Bears (loan)	0	(0)
2021–	Ealing Trailfinders	0	(0)
- Correct as of 6 June 2021
International career
Years	Team	Apps	(Points)
2016	Ireland U20	9	(0)
- Correct as of 6 June 2021

Stephen Kerins (born 1 May 1996) is an Irish rugby union player, who is currently playing for Ealing Trailfinders in the RFU Championship. He plays as a scrum-half.

== Connacht ==
Whilst still in the academy, Kerins made his senior competitive debut for Connacht in their 33–27 away victory against French side Bordeaux Bègles during the 2018–19 Challenge Cup on 19 January 2019. Kerins will join the Connacht senior squad ahead of the 2019–20 season.
