= Seán Masterson =

Irish rugby union player

- Born: 27 January 1998 (age 28) Portlaoise, Ireland
- Height: 1.91 m (6 ft 3 in)
- Weight: 109 kg (17.2 st; 240 lb)
- Notable relative: Eoghan Masterson (brother)

Rugby union career
- Position: Flanker
Senior career
Years	Team	Apps	(Points)
2019–	Connacht	18	
- Correct as of 21 May 2022

Seán Masterson (born 27 January 1998) is an Irish rugby union player, currently playing for Pro14 and European Rugby Champions Cup side Connacht. He plays in the flanker.

== Connacht ==
Masterson made his senior competitive debut for Connacht as a replacement in their 41–5 victory over Benetton during the 2018–19 Pro14 on 5 October 2019.
