= Conor McKeon =

Irish rugby union player (born 1994)

- Born: 4 January 1994 (age 32) Dublin, Ireland
- Height: 1.75 m (5 ft 9 in)
- Weight: 83 kg (13.1 st; 183 lb)
- School: Gonzaga College
- University: NUI Galway
- Notable relative: Eoin McKeon (second cousin)

Rugby union career
- Position: Scrum-half
Amateur team(s)
Years	Team	Apps	(Points)
2013–2015	Lansdowne		
2015–2019	Buccaneers		
Senior career
Years	Team	Apps	(Points)
2015–2019	Connacht	4	(4)
- Correct as of 24 April 2019
International career
Years	Team	Apps	(Points)
2012	Ireland U18		
2013	Ireland U19		
2014	Ireland U20	10	(11)
- Correct as of 19 January 2018

Conor McKeon (born 4 January 1994) is a rugby union player from Ireland. He primarily played fly-half for most of his youth career, before changing to scrum-half at senior level. McKeon played professionally for Irish provincial side Connacht in the Pro14 having come through the team's academy, and played his club rugby for Athlone-based side Buccaneers.

In April 2019, it was announced that McKeon would retire from rugby due to injury. His retirement came at the end of the 2018–19 season aged just 25.

== Early life ==
McKeon was born in Dublin, and grew up in Rathfarnham. He played rugby from a young age, with St Mary's, and also played hurling with Ballyboden St Enda's. McKeon attended Gonzaga College in Ranelagh, where he chose to focus exclusively on rugby. During his time in the college, he played as a fly-half and was part of the school's team in the Leinster Senior Schools Cup. After leaving school, McKeon joined All-Ireland League side Lansdowne. He received his third-level education at NUI Galway, where he studied commerce.

== Rugby career ==
=== Connacht ===
Having played under-age rugby for his native Leinster, McKeon joined the academy of rival province Connacht in 2014. His second cousin Eoin was already an established part of the senior squad. Despite being part of the Connacht academy, McKeon continued to play for Dublin-based Lansdowne throughout the season, as the team qualified for the All-Ireland League final. McKeon missed the team's victory over Clontarf however, as he made his senior Connacht debut on 9 May 2015, the same day the final took place. He came off the bench against Zebre, kicking two conversions.

In his second season in the academy, McKeon joined the Athlone-based Connacht Branch club Buccaneers. He made his second appearance for the province against Zebre. Ahead of the 2016–17 season, McKeon was converted from a fly-half to a scrum-half by the Connacht coaches. Although he did not make any first team appearances during his third year in the academy, but was named the province's Academy Player of the Year, helped Buccaneers earn promotion to the top flight of the AIL and earned a senior contract for the following season.

In his first season as a senior player, McKeon made just one appearance, playing off the bench in the 2017–18 Pro14 game against the Cheetahs. In the 2018–19 season he made his European debut, coming off the bench against Bordeaux Bègles in the Challenge Cup. In that game however, McKeon suffered a serious shoulder injury. No time-frame was given for his return to competitive action. In April 2019, it was announced that McKeon would retire from the game at the end of the season due to his ongoing struggles with injury.

=== International ===
McKeon has represented Ireland internationally at under-age level. His performances for Gonzaga saw him called up to the Ireland schools team for the European Under-18 Championship in 2012, where he was starting out-half of the side that finished as runners-up in the competition. The following year, he was part of the under-19 team. McKeon was part of Mike Ruddock's Ireland under-20 team for the 2014 Six Nations Under 20s Championship. He made appearances in all five of the team's games in the tournament, scoring one penalty against France. McKeon was also named in the squad for Junior World Championship later that year. He was kept out of the starting side by Ross Byrne but appeared from the bench in all five of Ireland's games, scoring eight points, as the team finished fourth.
