= Gavin Thornbury =

- Born: Gavin Thornbury; 19 October 1993 (age 33) Dublin, Ireland
- Height: 2.03 m (6 ft 8 in)
- Weight: 116 kg (18.3 st; 256 lb)
- School: Blackrock College
- University: University College Dublin

Rugby union career
- Position: Lock
Amateur team(s)
Years	Team	Apps	(Points)
–	UCD		
–	Wanganui		
- Correct as of 19 April 2020
Senior career
Years	Team	Apps	(Points)
2017–2024	Connacht	75	(20)
2024	Northampton Saints	6	(0)
- Correct as of 23 November 2024
International career
Years	Team	Apps	(Points)
2013	Ireland U20s	7	(0)
2022	Ireland Wolfhounds	1	(0)
- Correct as of 15 November 2022

Gavin Thornbury (born 19 October 1993) is an Irish rugby union player who plays as a lock for Utah Warriors in Major League Rugby.

Having completed three years in the Leinster Academy upon leaving Blackrock College, Thornbury earned a professional development contract for the 2015–16 season. However, Thornbury left Leinster to spend six months in New Zealand, where he played for club side Border on the North Island and helped them to victory in the Wanganui premier club competition. This earned Thornbury a call-up to Wanganui provincial representative team, who play in the Heartland Championship - the tier below New Zealand's Mitre 10 Cup and, in October 2016, Thornbury helped Wanganui win the Meads Cup.

Thornbury returned to Ireland and joined western province and then-defending Pro14 champions Connacht on a two-year contract in April 2017. Following a strong season in the Championship, Thornbury was named to the 2020–21 Pro14 Dream Team.

On 26 September 2024, Thornbury would move to English side Northampton Saints on a short-term deal as injury cover in the Gallagher Premiership for the 2024–25 season.
