= Conor Fitzgerald (rugby union) =

Irish rugby union player (born 1997)

- Born: 30 September 1997 (age 29) County Clare, Ireland
- Height: 1.84 m (6 ft 1/2 in)
- Weight: 90 kg (14 st; 200 lb)
- School: Ardscoil Rís
- Notable relative: Stephen Fitzgerald (brother)

Rugby union career
- Position: Fly-half
Amateur team(s)
| Years | Team | Apps | (Points) |
| 2016– | Shannon | | |
Senior career
| Years | Team | Apps | (Points) |
| 2018–2023 | Connacht | 63 | (224) |
- Correct as of 13 April 2023
International career
| Years | Team | Apps | (Points) |
| 2017 | Ireland U20 | 5 | (5) |
- Correct as of 8 June 2017

Conor Fitzgerald (born 30 September 1997) is an Irish rugby union player for Connacht in the United Rugby Championship. He plays primarily as a fly-half, and represents Shannon in the All-Ireland League.

== Early life ==
Born in County Clare, Fitzgerald attended Ardscoil Rís, Limerick, where he was part of the team that lost the 2015 Munster Schools Rugby Senior Cup final to Rockwell College. A former Limerick minor hurler, he represented Munster at Under-18 Clubs, Under-19, Under-20 and 'A' level, as well as representing Ireland at Under-19 and Under-20 level.

== Munster ==
Fitzgerald joined the Munster academy ahead of the 2017–18 season, having made his non-competitive debut for Munster during their pre-season fixture against Italian side Zebre in August 2016. However, Fitzgerald was released from the academy before the end of the 2017–18 season.

== Connacht ==
After leaving Munster, Fitzgerald joined the Connacht academy, and made his competitive debut for the province in their 22–10 win against French side Bordeaux Bègles during the 2018–19 Challenge Cup on 13 October 2018, before making his first start for Connacht one week later in their 34–13 defeat away to English side Sale Sharks. He will join the Connacht senior squad ahead of the 2019–20 season, having signed his first professional contract with the province in April 2019. In April 2023 it was announced that Fitzgerald would leave Connacht at the end of the 2022–23 season.

== Ireland ==
Fitzgerald made four appearances for Ireland Under-20s during the 2017 Six Nations Under 20s Championship, against Italy, France, Wales and England, whilst also making one appearance, against New Zealand, at the 2017 World Rugby Under 20 Championship.
