= Kyle Godwin =

Zimbabwean-Australian rugby union player

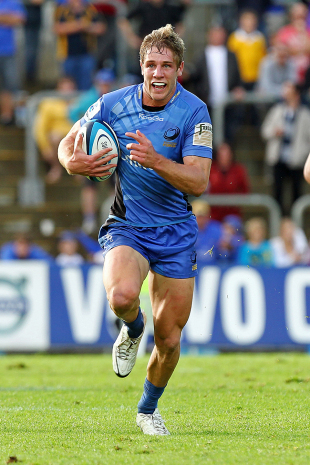
- Godwin with the Western Force in 2013
- Born: Kyle Willets Godwin; 30 July 1992 (age 34) Harare, Zimbabwe
- Height: 1.88 m (6 ft 2 in)
- Weight: 99 kg (15 st 8 lb)
- School: Aquinas College, Perth
- University: University of Western Australia

Rugby union career
- Position(s): Centre, Wing
Senior career
Years	Team	Apps	(Points)
2014−2016	Perth Spirit	8	(20)
2017–2018	NSW Country Eagles	15	(18)
2018–2020	Connacht	38	(62)
2022–2024	Lyon	40	(10)
- Correct as of 21 April 2024
Super Rugby
Years	Team	Apps	(Points)
2012–2016	Western Force	52	(47)
2017–2018	Brumbies	24	(30)
2020–2022	Western Force	30	(25)
- Correct as of 28 May 2022
International career
Years	Team	Apps	(Points)
2012	Australia U20	5	(21)
2016	Australia	1	(0)
2024	Zimbabwe	2	(0)
- Correct as of 16 November 2024

Kyle Godwin (born 30 July 1992) is a former professional rugby union player who played as a centre. He has also played at wing and fly-half on occasion. Godwin began, and has played most of his career with, the Western Force in the Super Rugby. He has played for Super Rugby rivals the Brumbies, as well as Connacht in Ireland and Lyon in France.

In 2016 Godwin made his international debut for Australia against France in the 2016 Autumn Internationals. He did not make another appearance for the team and was capped with Zimbabwe in 2024, qualifying via birth-right.

== Early life ==
Godwin was born in Zimbabwe and moved with his family to Perth in the Australian state of Western Australia at 8-years-old, where he played for the Associates Rugby Club. He first came onto the scene when he was selected for the Australian Schoolboys team which toured Great Britain and Ireland in 2009. He was also selected to represent Australia U20s that competed in the 2012 IRB Junior World Championship in South Africa.

== Career ==
In 2012, Godwin made his Super Rugby debut for the Western Force against the Queensland Reds in Perth. He went on to play 52 games for the Western Force before moving to the Brumbies. During his time at the Force, he won "Rookie of the Year", Members "Most Valuable Player" (MVP), and the "Nathan Sharpe Medal", named after team veteran Nathan Sharpe. He moved to Canberra in 2016, signing for the Brumbies, where he played 24 games over two seasons (2017, 2018).

On 20 March 2018, it was announced that Godwin was to play in the Pro 14, having signed for Irish club Connacht for the 2018–19 season. The contract being of two-year duration initially.

On successful completion of his two-year contract with Connacht, Godwin returned to his home team of the Western Force. During this period with the Western Force Godwin ended up achieving 106 Super Rugby games. After playing a further two years with the Western Force, Godwin signed a contract with Top 14 giant Lou Rugby. He spent two years playing for the club in France where they placed 3rd and 11th in his two respective years.

== International career ==
Godwin played international age-group rugby for Australia up to Under 20s. He gained his one senior cap for the Wallabies against France on 19 November 2016, playing the full game at inside centre.

In 2024, having served the required 'stand-down' period of five years or more since last playing for his original international side, Godwin received his first call-up for the country of his birth. He made his debut for Zimbabwe against the United Arab Emirates on 6 November 2024, coming on in the second half as a replacement at inside centre, joining a backline featuring his former teammate from the Western Force, Ian Prior.

== Playing statistics ==
=== Super Rugby ===
As of 10 July 2020

Season	Team	Games	Starts	Sub	Mins	Tries	Cons	Pens	Drops	Points	Yel	Red
2012	Force	3	0	3	46	1	1	0	0	7	0	0
2013	Force	14	14	0	1111	2	2	2	0	20	0	0
2014	Force	10	10	0	797	1	0	0	0	5	0	0
2015	Force	16	16	0	1228	1	0	0	0	5	0	0
2016	Force	9	7	2	565	2	0	0	0	10	0	0
2017	Brumbies	11	11	0	799	2	0	0	0	10	1	0
2018	Brumbies	13	10	2	292	4	0	0	0	20	1	0
2020	Force	0	0	0	0	0	0	0	0	0	0	0
Total		76	61	7	4825	10	3	2	0	82	1	0
