= Eoin McKeon =

Irish rugby union player (born 1991)

- Born: 23 June 1991 (age 35) Galway, Ireland
- Height: 1.88 m (6 ft 2 in)
- Weight: 110 kg (17 st 5 lb; 243 lb)
- School: Coláiste Iognáid
- University: NUI Galway
- Notable relative: Conor McKeon (second cousin)

Rugby union career
- Position(s): Number 8, Flanker
- Current team: Connacht
Amateur team(s)
Years	Team	Apps	(Points)
- Galwegians
Senior career
Years	Team	Apps	(Points)
2010–2020	Connacht	128	(69)
- Correct as of 19 April 2020
International career
Years	Team	Apps	(Points)
2011	Ireland U20	7	(5)
2013	Emerging Ireland	2	(0)
2015	Wolfhounds	1	(0)
- Correct as of 11 February 2015

Eoin McKeon (born 23 June 1991) is a rugby union player from Ireland. He primarily played in the back row. McKeon played for his native province of Connacht in the Pro14 from 2010 to 2020. He played his club rugby for Galwegians.

== Early life ==
McKeon grew up in Galway, and was a fan of Galwegians from a young age. He has stated that Eric Elwood, later his coach at Connacht, was one of his heroes growing up. McKeon went to secondary school in Coláiste Iognáid in the city, and was later a student in NUI Galway, the local university. McKeon's is a second cousin of Conor McKeon, another Connacht player.

== Connacht ==
Having played for All-Ireland League club Galwegians, and been part of the province's academy, McKeon made his Connacht debut in the 2009–10 Celtic League. On 25 April 2010, away to Welsh side Scarlets in one of the last games of the season, McKeon came on as a replacement flanker. In the 2010–11 season, Eric Elwood took over as head coach and over the course of the season McKeon started two matches for the province.

McKeon played in only four of Connacht's matches in the 2011–12 Pro 12 (the new name for the league), all of them as a replacement, but he played a role in Connacht's European campaign. McKeon made his European debut on 10 December 2012, coming on from the bench against Gloucester and played a part in three of his side's six games in the 2011–12 Heineken Cup, the team's first ever appearance in the competition.

In the 2012–13 season, McKeon played far more regularly for the team, playing in 17 matches in the 2012–13 Pro 12, 16 of these being starts. He also scored his first try for the team, crossing the line for Connacht in the game at home to Zebre in the league. At European level, McKeon played in four of Connacht's 2012–13 Heineken Cup matches, and started in three of these games. He was involved in Connacht's home game with Biarritz, and despite picking up a yellow card, was part of a Connacht victory. Elwood departed his post as Connacht coach at the end of the season.

In the following season Elwood was replaced by Pat Lam. McKeon made three appearances in 2013–14 Heineken Cup, coming off the bench in a memorable win over Toulouse and starting two more games. He made 11 appearances in the 2013–14 Pro12, starting in all but one of these games. During the course of the league season McKeon scored three tries, with these coming against Munster, Scarlets and Benetton Treviso.

In the 2014–15 season McKeon was part of a strong Connacht start to the Pro12 campaign. McKeon started in all of Connacht's opening games, with the team winning each win. McKeon also scored the team's first try of the season when he touched down against the Newport Gwent Dragons. McKeon made his 50th senior appearance for the side on 26 September 2014 against Glasgow Warriors as Connacht's winning start was brought to an end.

== International ==
McKeon represented Ireland at under-age international level, including playing for the Irish Under-20 team. He was part of the Irish squad for the 2011 IRB Junior World Championship.
