= Matthew Burke (rugby union, born 1997) =

Irish rugby union player

- Born: 4 February 1997 (age 29) Lewisham, England
- Height: 1.80 m (5 ft 11 in)
- Weight: 108 kg (17.0 st; 238 lb)
- School: Yeats College Ballinrobe Community School

Rugby union career
- Position: Prop
Amateur team(s)
Years	Team	Apps	(Points)
2015–	Galwegians		
- Corinthians
Senior career
Years	Team	Apps	(Points)
2018–2024	Connacht	39	(0)
- Correct as of 16 May 2024
International career
Years	Team	Apps	(Points)
2015	Ireland U18	1	(0)
2017	Ireland U20	2	(0)
- Correct as of 10 January 2021

Matthew Burke (born 4 February 1997) is an Irish rugby union player who is currently a member of the Connacht academy. He plays as a prop, and represents Corinthians in the All-Ireland League.

== Early life ==
Born in Lewisham, London, Burke moved to Ireland when he was one year old, settling in Ballinrobe, County Mayo, where his father's parents were from. He first began playing rugby aged 6 with the local club in Ballinrobe, before joining Galwegians in 2015, and represented Connacht at various age grade levels, as well as winning a cap for the Ireland schoolboys team in February 2015. Following this, he made his way across town to play more competitive adult rugby for Corinthians RFC.

== Connacht ==
Whilst still in the academy, Burke made his senior competitive debut for Connacht in their 34–14 away defeat against English side Sale Sharks during the 2018–19 Challenge Cup on 20 October 2018. Burke signed a professional contract with the province in April 2019, which will see him join the senior squad ahead of the 2019–20 season.
