= 2014–15 Munster Rugby season =

- Ground(s): Thomond Park; Musgrave Park (Capacity: 26,500; 8,500)
- Coach: Anthony Foley
- Captain: Peter O'Mahony
- League: Pro12
- 2014–15: 2nd (runners-up)
1st kit	2nd kit

The 2014–15 Munster Rugby season was Munster's fourteenth season competing in the Pro12, alongside which they also competed in the new European Rugby Champions Cup. It was Anthony Foley's first season as head coach.

== Events ==
On 27 August a document detailing players individual strengths and weaknesses was leaked. The email intended only for the management team was accidentally sent to every player in the Munster squad. Players were notified within an hour that the email had been sent to them through human error. Anthony Foley speaking on 3 September said that it is unfortunate that the document was leaked saying "It will never, ever happen again. It's unfortunate that it's out in the public domain, something that we do behind closed doors to make us better."

Upgrades to Thomond Park were completed in time for the new season kick off on 5 September against Edinburgh. The creation of a Fan Zone Plaza and introduction of a dedicated Bank of Ireland Family Fun Zone, and face-lift of the Guinness Dug Out bar were among the improvements and changes carried out at the ground. The new Fanzone Plaza was officially opened on 10 October before the match against the Scarlets.

The season kicked off on 5 September against Edinburgh at Thomond Park, a match that Munster lost 13–14. Munster secured their first win of the season, a 21–10 away win against Benetton Treviso on 12 September. The following week on 19 September, Simon Zebo scored a hat-trick of try's against Zebre at Thomond Park as Munser recorded their second win of the season on a 31–5 scoreline. On 27 September, Munster suffered a second defeat at home in three games when the Ospreys won 19–14. On 4 October, Munster beat Leinster in Dublin for the first time since 2008 with a 34–23 win at the Aviva Stadium. First half try's from James Cronin, Robin Copeland, and an interception try from Ian Keatley gave Munster a 28–9 lead at half time. Munster received four yellow cards in the second half.

On 18 October in their first game in the new European Rugby Champions Cup against Sale Sharks, Munster came back from 23–7 down at half-time to win the game 27–26 with a last kick drop-goal from Ian Keatley. On 24 October in their first home game in the European Rugby Champions Cup, Munster defeated Saracens 14–3 to continue their winning start to the European campaign.

On 6 December in their second home game in the European Rugby Champions Cup, Munster lost 16–9 to Clermont Auvergne, with Clermont becoming the first French team to win a European game at Thomond Park. The loss was the third defeat in 53 European games for Munster on their home ground. Eight days later on 14 December, Munster lost the away game against Clermont by 26–19. Ian Keatley's two penalties gave Munster an early lead but two tries from Clermont gave them a 15-6 half-time lead. Clermont scored another try in the second half but Munster gained a losing bonus point with a try from Duncan Casey and a late Ian Keatley penalty.

On 17 January, Munster lost 33–10 to Saracens in their second last game in the pool stage, a defeat that meant that they would not qualify for the quarter-finals, only the second time that has happened in seventeen seasons. Saracens had a 23–3 lead at half-time after a disappointing display from Munster. It is the first time in history that Munster have lost three pool games in succession.

In their final pool game of the European Rugby Champions Cup against Sale Sharks on 25 January at Thomond Park, Munster won by 65–10. Munster scored nine tries in total, eight came in a second half during which they scored 52 points without reply. Munster ended the pool stage with three wins from six games, finishing third behind Clermont and Saracens who both made the last eight.

On 16 May, Munster had a bonus-point 50–27 win against the Newport Gwent Dragons, scoring eight tries which booked a home semi-final against the Ospreys in the Pro12 on 23 May.

On 23 May, Munster defeated the Ospreys by 21–18 to reach the 2015 Pro12 Grand Final on 30 May at the Kingspan Stadium. Josh Matavesi looked to have won it for the Ospreys with an injury-time try, but it was ruled out after Rhys Webb had knocked on earlier in the move. The game was Paul O'Connell's last game for Munster at Thomond Park. Munster went on to lose the final to Glasgow on a 31–13 scoreline.

== Coaching and management staff 2014–15 ==
Position	Name	Nationality
Head coach	Anthony Foley	Ireland
Team manager	Niall O'Donovan	Ireland
Scrum Coach	Jerry Flannery	Ireland
Backs Coach	Brian Walsh	Ireland
Assistant coach	Ian Costello	Ireland
Technical Advisor	Mick O'Driscoll	Ireland
Head of Fitness	Adam Trypas	Australia
Strength & conditioning coach	Aidan O'Connell	Ireland
Conditioning Assistant	Will Douglas	Wales
Head of physiotherapy	Anthony Coole	South Africa
Physiotherapist	Colm Fuller	Ireland
Rehab physiotherapist	Colm Oakley	Ireland
Performance analyst	George Murray	Ireland
Asst. Performance Analyst	Elliot Corcoran	Ireland
Kit manager	Jack Kiely	Ireland
Operations manager	Bryan Murphy	Ireland

== Senior Playing Squad 2014–15 ==
Note: Flags indicate national union under World Rugby eligibility rules. Players may hold more than one non-World Rugby nationality.

Player	Position	Union
Duncan Casey	Hooker	Ireland
Eusebio Guiñazú	Hooker	Argentina
Niall Scannell	Hooker	Ireland
**Mike Sherry**	Hooker	Ireland
**Damien Varley**	Hooker	Ireland
**Stephen Archer**	Prop	Ireland
**BJ Botha**	Prop	South Africa
Alan Cotter	Prop	Ireland
**James Cronin**	Prop	Ireland
Martin Kelly	Prop	Ireland
**Dave Kilcoyne**	Prop	Ireland
John Ryan	Prop	Ireland
Dave Foley	Lock	Ireland
Billy Holland	Lock	Ireland
**Donncha O'Callaghan**	Lock	Ireland
**Paul O'Connell**	Lock	Ireland
**Donnacha Ryan**	Lock	Ireland
Shane Buckley	Flanker	Ireland
Sean Dougall	Flanker	Ireland
Dave O'Callaghan	Flanker	Ireland
**Tommy O'Donnell**	Flanker	Ireland
Barry O'Mahony	Flanker	Ireland
**Peter O'Mahony** (c)	Flanker	Ireland
CJ Stander	Flanker	South Africa
Paddy Butler	Number 8	Ireland
Robin Copeland	Number 8	Ireland

Player	Position	Union
**Conor Murray**	Scrum-half	Ireland
Cathal Sheridan	Scrum-half	Ireland
Duncan Williams	Scrum-half	Ireland
JJ Hanrahan	Fly-half	Ireland
Jonathan Holland	Fly-half	Ireland
**Ian Keatley**	Fly-half	Ireland
Cian Bohane	Centre	Ireland
Tyler Bleyendaal	Centre	New Zealand
Ivan Dineen	Centre	Ireland
**Keith Earls**	Centre	Ireland
Andrew Smith	Centre	Australia
Andrew Conway	Wing	Ireland
Johne Murphy	Wing	Ireland
Luke O'Dea	Wing	Ireland
Ronan O'Mahony	Wing	Ireland
Gerhard van den Heever	Wing	South Africa
**Simon Zebo**	Wing	Ireland
**Denis Hurley**	Fullback	Ireland
**Felix Jones**	Fullback	Ireland

Internationally capped players in bold.

=== Players In ===
- (Argentina) Eusebio Guiñazú from (England) Bath
- (Ireland) Martin Kelly from (Ireland) Dublin University
- (Ireland) Shane Buckley promoted from Academy
- (Ireland) Robin Copeland from (Wales) Cardiff Blues
- (Ireland) Jonathan Holland promoted from Academy
- (New Zealand) Tyler Bleyendaal from (New Zealand) Crusaders
- (Australia) Andrew Smith from (Australia) Brumbies

=== Players Out ===
- (Ireland) James Coughlan to (France) Pau
- (Ireland) Ian Nagle released
- (Ireland) Niall Ronan retired
- (Ireland) James Downey to (Scotland) Glasgow Warriors
- (New Zealand) Casey Laulala to (France) Racing Métro
- (New Zealand) Quentin MacDonald to (New Zealand) Chiefs

== 2014–15 Pro12 ==
5 September 2014
19:35

(1 BP) Munster (Ireland)	13–14	(Scotland) Edinburgh
Try: Stander (2) 35' m, 59' m Pen: Keatley (1/2) 69'	Report	Try: Cuthbert 47' m Pen: Heathcote (3/5) 3', 8', 40'

Thomond Park
Attendance: 13,428
Referee: Leighton Hodges (WRU)

12 September 2014
20:00

Benetton Treviso (Italy)	10–21	(Ireland) Munster
Try: Ragusi 17' c Con: Carlisle (1/1); Pen: Carlisle (1/3) 63'	Report	Try: Stander 28' c Zebo 50' m Con: Keatley (1/2); Pen: Keatley (3/3) 2', 25', 70'

Stadio Comunale di Monigo
Attendance: 3,491
Referee: Andrew McMenemy (SRU)

19 September 2014
19:30

(1 BP) Munster (Ireland)	31–5	(Italy) Zebre
Try: Zebo (3) 14' m, 30' m, 36' c Smith 43' c Kilcoyne 64' c Con: Hanrahan (3/4)	Report	Try: Vunisa 80' m

Thomond Park
Attendance: 12,488
Referee: Ian Davies (WRU)

27 September 2014
18:30

(1 BP) Munster (Ireland)	14–19	(Wales) Ospreys
Try: van den Heever 11' m Pen: Keatley (3/4) 40', 41', 56'	Report	Try: Hassler 15' c Con: Biggar (1/1); Pen: Biggar (4/4) 32', 53', 65', 69'

Thomond Park
Attendance: 13,547
Referee: Neil Hennessy (WRU)

4 October 2014
18:30

Leinster (Ireland)	23–34	(Ireland) Munster
Try: Fanning 62' c penalty try 69' c Con: Madigan (2/2); Pen: Madigan (3/3) 2', 12', 35'	Report	Try: Cronin 18' m Copeland 31' c Keatley 37' c Con: Keatley (2/3); Pen: Keatley (4/5) 4', 16', 24', 66'; Hanrahan (1/1) 76'

Aviva Stadium
Attendance: 43,817
Referee: Ian Davies (WRU)

10 October 2014
19:35

Munster (Ireland)	17–6	(Wales) Scarlets
Try: Smith 24' m Pen: Hanrahan (4/6) 21', 42', 48', 60'	Report	Pen: Priestland (1/3) 38'; Drop: Priestland (1/1) 1'

Thomond Park
Attendance: 13,851
Referee: Claudio Blessano (FIR)

1 November 2014
17:15

(1 BP) Cardiff Blues (Wales)	24–28	(Ireland) Munster
Try: Amorosino 33' m Vosawai 62' c Con: G. Davies (1/2); Pen: Patchell (3/4) 8', 13', 23'; G. Davies (1/1) 73'	Report	Try: Butler 77' c Con: J. Holland (1/1); Pen: Hanrahan (7/7) 2', 10', 15', 19', 32', 39', 69'

BT Sport Cardiff Arms Park
Attendance: 6,902
Referee: Marius Mitrea (FIR)

21 November 2014
19:30

Newport Gwent Dragons (Wales)	12–38	(Ireland) Munster (1 BP)
Pen: G. Jones (4/5) 5', 19', 32', 65'	Report	Try: Copeland 14' c Casey (2) 46' c, 72' c Smith 62' c R. O'Mahony 78' c Con: Keatley (5/5); Pen: Keatley (1/1) 43'

Rodney Parade
Attendance: 5,783
Referee: Matteo Liperini (FIR)

28 November 2014
19:35

Munster (Ireland)	21–20	(Ireland) Ulster (1 BP)
Try: Copeland 29' m Williams 43' c Con: Keatley (1/2); Pen: Keatley (3/5) 23', 51', 54'	Report	Try: Williams 79' m Pen: Humphreys (5/5) 2', 10', 12', 20', 71'

Thomond Park
Attendance: 17,101
Referee: Ian Davies (WRU)

20 December 2014
14:40

Glasgow Warriors (Scotland)	21–18	(Ireland) Munster (1 BP)
Try: Nakarawa 51' c Gray 72' m Con: Russell (1/2); Pen: Russell (3/5) 6', 18', 29'	Report	Try: Hanrahan 7' m Copeland 40' c Con: Hanrahan (1/2); Pen: Hanrahan (2/4) 26', 36'

Scotstoun Stadium
Attendance: 6,176
Referee: Leighton Hodges (WRU)

26 December 2014
17:00

Munster (Ireland)	28–13	(Ireland) Leinster
Try: Stander 16' m Conway 44' c Da. O'Callaghan 62' c Con: Keatley (2/3); Pen: Keatley (3/4) 2', 31', 54'	Report	Try: Jennings 69' c Con: Madigan (1/1); Pen: Madigan (2/3) 6', 28'

Thomond Park
Attendance: 25,600
Referee: Nigel Owens (WRU)

1 January 2015
17:00

Connacht (Ireland)	24–16	(Ireland) Munster
Try: Marmion 29' c Ronaldson 42' c Muldowney 60' c Con: Ronaldson (1/1); Leader (2/2); Pen: Nikora (1/1) 55'	Report	Try: P. O'Mahony 10' c Con: Keatley (1/1); Pen: Keatley (3/3) 7', 15', 38'

Galway Sportsgrounds
Attendance: 7,745
Referee: David Wilkinson (IRFU)

10 January 2015
16:00

Zebre (Italy)	7–31	(Ireland) Munster (1 BP)
Try: Fabiani 57' c Con: Orquera (1/1)	Report	Try: Jones 13' c Stander 28' c Murray 32' c Zebo 42' c Con: Keatley (4/4); Pen: Keatley (1/1) 8'

Stadio XXV Aprile
Attendance: 2,615
Referee: Ian Davies (WRU)

14 February 2015
19:35

Munster (Ireland)	33–16	(Wales) Cardiff Blues
Try: Hurley 47' c O'Donoghue 59' c R. O'Mahony 80' c Con: Hanrahan (3/3); Pen: Hanrahan (4/5) 10', 35', 38', 76'	Report	Try: Navidi 70' c Con: Patchell (1/1); Pen: Patchell (3/3) 13', 17', 30'

Irish Independent Park
Attendance: 6,991
Referee: Lloyd Linton (SRU)

21 February 2015
14:40

Scarlets (Wales)	25–25	(Ireland) Munster
Try: Parkes 60' c Con: S. Shingler (1/1); Pen: S. Shingler (6/6) 3', 14', 23', 27', 59', 68'	Report	Try: O'Donoghue 53' c Jones 75' m Hanrahan 80' c Con: Keatley (2/3); Pen: Keatley (2/3) 10', 20'

Parc y Scarlets
Attendance: 6,059
Referee: Dudley Phillips (IRFU)

28 February 2015
19:15

(1 BP) Munster (Ireland)	22–10	(Scotland) Glasgow Warriors
Try: O'Donoghue 28' m Guiñazú 37' c Earls 61' m Stander 66' m Con: Keatley (1/4)	Report	Try: de Klerk 59' c Con: Braid (1/1); Pen: Braid (1/2) 52'

Irish Independent Park
Attendance: 7,361
Referee: Nigel Owens (WRU)

7 March 2015
14:40

Ospreys (Wales)	26–12	(Ireland) Munster
Try: Baker 31' m Pen: Davies (6/6) 4', 22', 37', 60', 74', 79'; Drop: Davies (1/2) 39'	Report	Try: D. Ryan 71' m Earls 76' c Con: Keatley (1/2)

Liberty Stadium
Attendance: 8,632
Referee: Marius Mitrea (FIR)

28 March 2015
17:15

(1 BP) Munster (Ireland)	42–20	(Ireland) Connacht
Try: B. Holland 12' c Casey 55' c Zebo 63' c Smith 72' c Hurley 74' c Earls 79' c Con: Keatley (3/3); Hanrahan (3/3)	Report	Try: Nikora 68' c O'Leary 78' c Con: Nikora (2/2); Pen: Carty (2/3) 1', 45'

Thomond Park
Attendance: 18,762
Referee: Leighton Hodges (WRU)

11 April 2015
19:30

Edinburgh (Scotland)	3–34	(Ireland) Munster (1 BP)
Pen: Heathcote (1/1) 3'	Report	Try: Casey 32' c Stander 52' m Murray 56' c Zebo 62' m Earls 64' c Con: Keatley (3/5); Pen: Keatley (1/1) 19'

Murrayfield Stadium
Attendance: 4,818
Referee: Ian Davies (WRU)

25 April 2015
15:05

(1 BP) Munster (Ireland)	30–19	(Italy) Benetton Treviso
Try: Zebo 9' m Stander 18' m O'Donnell 39' c penalty try 67' c Con: Keatley (2/4); Pen: Keatley (2/2) 4', 52'	Report	Try: Luamanu 24' c Pratichetti 42' c Ragusi 74' m Con: Hayward (2/3)

Irish Independent Park
Attendance: 7,644
Referee: Ben Whitehouse (WRU)

9 May 2015
14:40

Ulster (Ireland)	23–23	(Ireland) Munster
Try: Bowe 40' c P. Marshall 80' c Con: Jackson (2/2); Pen: Jackson (3/3) 39', 44', 70'	Report	Try: Earls 76' m Pen: Keatley (6/6) 4', 31', 36', 54', 60', 68'

Kingspan Stadium
Attendance: 17,139
Referee: Nigel Owens (WRU)

16 May 2015
15:00

(1 BP) Munster (Ireland)	50–27	(Wales) Newport Gwent Dragons (1 BP)
Try: Smith 3' c Stander 8' c Murray (3) 16' c, 23' c, 64' m O'Connell 40' m Earls 41' c R. O'Mahony 78' m Con: Keatley (5/6)	Report	Try: Hewitt 4' c Morgan 50' c Buckley 74' m Dixon 80' m Con: Tovey (2/2); Pen: Tovey (1/1) 2'

Irish Independent Park
Attendance: 8,200
Referee: Ben Whitehouse (WRU)

=== Semi-final ===
23 May 2015
14:30

Munster (Ireland)	21–18	(Wales) Ospreys
Try: Zebo 39' m Hurley 42' m Butler 49' m Pen: Keatley (2/4) 16', 22'	Report	Try: Webb 46' m Hassler 52' c Con: Biggar (1/2); Pen: Biggar (2/2) 13', 66'

Thomond Park
Attendance: 16,158
Referee: Nigel Owens (WRU)

=== Final ===
30 May 2015
18:30

Munster (Ireland)	13–31	(Scotland) Glasgow Warriors
Try: Smith 37' c Con: Keatley (1/1); Pen: Keatley (2/3) 23', 48'	Report	Try: Harley 8' c Van der Merwe 25' c Pyrgos 31' c Russell 58' c Con: Russell (4/4); Pen: Weir (1/1) 73'

Kingspan Stadium
Attendance: 17,057
Referee: Nigel Owens (WRU)

FB	15	(Ireland) Felix Jones
RW	14	(Ireland) Keith Earls
OC	13	(Australia) Andrew Smith
IC	12	(Ireland) Denis Hurley (c)
LW	11	(Ireland) Simon Zebo	(substituted off) 56'
FH	10	(Ireland) Ian Keatley	(substituted off) 56'
SH	9	(Ireland) Duncan Williams	(substituted off) 71'
N8	8	(South Africa) CJ Stander
OF	7	(Ireland) Paddy Butler	10' to 19'		(substituted off) 71'
BF	6	(Ireland) Donnacha Ryan
RL	5	(Ireland) Paul O'Connell
LL	4	(Ireland) Billy Holland	(substituted off) 60'
TP	3	(South Africa) BJ Botha	(substituted off) 60'
HK	2	(Argentina) Eusebio Guiñazú	(substituted off) 62'
LP	1	(Ireland) Dave Kilcoyne	(substituted off) 62'
Replacements:
HK	16	(Ireland) Duncan Casey	(substituted on) 62'
PR	17	(Ireland) James Cronin	(substituted on) 62'
PR	18	(Ireland) Stephen Archer	(substituted on) 60'
FL	19	(Ireland) Sean Dougall	(substituted on) 10'	(substituted off) 19'	(substituted on) 71'
N8	20	(Ireland) Jack O'Donoghue	(substituted on) 60'
SH	21	(Ireland) Cathal Sheridan	(substituted on) 71'
FH	22	(Ireland) JJ Hanrahan	(substituted on) 56'
WG	23	(Ireland) Ronan O'Mahony	(substituted on) 56'
Coach:
(Ireland) Anthony Foley

FB	15	(Scotland) Stuart Hogg	(substituted off) 62'
RW	14	(Scotland) Tommy Seymour
OC	13	(Scotland) Richie Vernon
IC	12	(Scotland) Peter Horne
LW	11	(Canada) D. T. H. van der Merwe	(substituted off) 70'
FH	10	(Scotland) Finn Russell	(substituted off) 66'
SH	9	(Scotland) Henry Pyrgos
N8	8	(South Africa) Josh Strauss (c)
OF	7	(Scotland) Ryan Wilson
BF	6	(Scotland) Rob Harley	(substituted off) 60'
RL	5	(Scotland) Jonny Gray
LL	4	(Fiji) Leone Nakarawa	(substituted off) 66'
TP	3	(South Africa) Rossouw de Klerk	(substituted off) 52'
HK	2	(Scotland) Dougie Hall	(substituted off) 62'
LP	1	(Scotland) Gordon Reid	(substituted off) 77'
Replacements:
HK	16	(Scotland) Fraser Brown	(substituted on) 62'
PR	17	(Fiji) Jerry Yanuyanutawa	(substituted on) 77'
PR	18	(Scotland) Jon Welsh	(substituted on) 52'
LK	19	(Scotland) Alastair Kellock	(substituted on) 66'
FL	20	(Scotland) Chris Fusaro	(substituted on) 60'
SH	21	(Fiji) Nikola Matawalu	(substituted on) 70'
FH	22	(Scotland) Duncan Weir	(substituted on) 66'
WG	23	(Scotland) Sean Lamont	(substituted on) 62'
Coach:
(Scotland) Gregor Townsend

Man of the Match:
(Fiji) Leone Nakarawa (Glasgow Warriors)

Touch judges:
Ian Davies (WRU)
Sean Brickell (WRU)
Television match official:
Derek Bevan (WRU)

== 2014–15 European Rugby Champions Cup ==
=== Pool 1 ===
Team	P	W	D	L	PF	PA	Diff	TF	TA	TB	LB	Pts
(France) Clermont (3)	6	5	0	1	140	80	+60	14	6	1	1	22
(England) Saracens (8)	6	4	0	2	119	95	+24	12	10	1	0	17
(Ireland) Munster	6	3	0	3	144	114	+30	15	11	1	2	15
(England) Sale Sharks	6	0	0	6	82	196	−114	8	22	0	2	2

18 October 2014
13:00

Sale Sharks (England)	26–27	(Ireland) Munster
Try: Lund 23' c Leota 28' c Con: Cipriani (2/2) 25', 29'; Pen: Cipriani (4/4) 6', 15', 18', 68'	Report	Try: Kilcoyne 9' c Conway 55' c Murray 64' c Con: Keatley (3/3) 10', 56', 65'; Pen: Keatley (1/1) 71'; Drop: Keatley (1/1) 80'

AJ Bell Stadium
Attendance: 9,879
Referee: Mathieu Raynal (FFR)

24 October 2014
19:45

Munster (Ireland)	14-3	(England) Saracens
Try: Kilcoyne 60' m Pen: Keatley (2/6) 26', 53'; Drop: Keatley 65'	Report	Pen: Owen Farrell (1/2) 37'

Thomond Park
Attendance: 26,000
Referee: Jerome Garces (FFR)

6 December 2014
17:30

(1 BP) Munster (Ireland)	9–16	(France) Clermont
Pen: Keatley (3/3) 15', 26', 61'	Report	Try: Lee 1' m Fofana 21' m Pen: Lopez (1/2) 30'; Drop: Lopez (1/1) 34'

Thomond Park
Attendance: 25,600
Referee: Wayne Barnes (RFU)

14 December 2014
16:15

Clermont (France)	26–19	(Ireland) Munster (1 BP)
Try: Chouly (2) 18' m, 72' m Nakaitaci 40' c Con: Lopez (1/3) 40'; Pen: Lopez (3/4) 26', 45', 59'	Report	Try: Casey 75' c Con: Keatley (1/1) 75'; Pen: Keatley (4/4) 5', 12', 42', 82'

Stade Marcel-Michelin
Attendance: 17,723
Referee: Nigel Owens (WRU)

17 January 2015
13:00

Saracens (England)	33–10	(Ireland) Munster
Try: Wyles 20' c Ashton (2) 35' c, 73' c Con: Farrell (3/3) 22', 36', 74'; Pen: Farrell (4/5) 8', 29', 40', 57'	Report	Try: Hurley 69' c Con: Keatley (1/1) 69'; Pen: Keatley (1/1) 32'

Allianz Park
Attendance: 9,999
Referee: Romain Poite (FFR) /
Christophe Berdos (FFR)

25 January 2015
15:15

(1 BP) Munster (Ireland)	65–10	(England) Sale Sharks
Try: Zebo (2) 1' c, 67' m Earls 41' c Penalty try 53' c Howard 64' c Conway (2) 68' m, 79' c O'Donnell 72' c Williams 76' c Con: Keatley (4/5) 2', 41', 54', 65'; Hanrahan (3/4) 73', 77', 80'; Pen: Keatley (2/3) 6', 10'	Report	Try: Arscott 11' c Con: Macleod (1/1) 12'; Pen: Macleod (1/1) 8'

Thomond Park
Attendance: 17,685
Referee: Marius Mitrea (FIR)
