= 2015 Pro12 Grand Final =

Rugby union match

- Event: 2014–15 Pro12
Munster	Glasgow Warriors
(Ireland)	(Scotland)
13	31
- Date: 30 May 2015
- Venue: Kingspan Stadium, Belfast
- Referee: Nigel Owens (WRU)
- Attendance: 17,057
- Weather: Overcast

The 2015 Pro12 Grand Final was the final match of the 2014–15 Pro12 season. The 2014–15 season was the first with Guinness as the title sponsor and the sixth ever League Grand Final. The final was played between Glasgow Warriors and Munster.

Glasgow won their first title, winning on a 31–13 scoreline.

== Route to the final ==
=== 2015 play-offs ===
The semi-finals followed a 1 v 4, 2 v 3 system with the games being played at the home ground of the higher placed teams.

22 May 2015
19:45

Glasgow Warriors (Scotland)	16–14	(Ireland) Ulster
Try: Van der Merwe 75' c Con: Russell (1/1); Pen: Russell (2/2) 5', 60'; Hogg (1/2) 13'	Report	Try: Henry 18' m Pen: Pienaar (3/3) 1', 55', 66'

Scotstoun Stadium
Attendance: 10,000
Referee: George Clancy (IRFU)

23 May 2015
14:30

Munster (Ireland)	21–18	(Wales) Ospreys
Try: Zebo 39' m Hurley 42' m Butler 49' m Pen: Keatley (2/4) 16', 22'	Report	Try: Webb 46' m Hassler 52' c Con: Biggar (1/2); Pen: Biggar (2/2) 13', 66'

Thomond Park
Attendance: 16,158
Referee: Nigel Owens (WRU)

== Build-up ==
In January 2015, the tournament organisers confirmed that the Kingspan Stadium in Belfast would host the final. The organisers chose to move away from giving home advantage to the highest placed finisher at the end of the regular season.

Munster were looking to win the title for a fourth time, the last win being in 2011 against Leinster, while Glasgow had never won the title.

The match was shown live on Sky Sports in Ireland and the UK, on TG4 in Ireland and on BBC Two Scotland in Scotland. Both teams received an allocation of 2,000 tickets after the public sale sold out in April.

Conor Murray was an injury doubt to start for Munster after he was forced off in the semi-final with an injury to the medial ligament in his right knee, he may be replaced again by Duncan Williams at scrum-half. Paul O'Connell was expected to play his last game for Munster in the final.

== Match ==
=== Summary ===
Rob Harley scored the first try for Glasgow in the 9th minute which was converted by Finn Russell. Ian Keatley got the first score for Munster, a penalty in the 23rd minute. Glasgow then scored two tries without reply to lead 21–3 in the 32nd minute and lead 10–21 at half time, Andrew Smith scored the Munster try just before half time. Ian Keatley reduced the lead to 13–21 in the 48th minute with another penalty for Munster but a Finn Russell try and conversion in the 58th minute made the score 13–28 in favor of Glasgow. Another penalty for Glasgow by Duncan Weir with seven minutes to go made the final score 13–31.

=== Details ===
30 May 2015
18:30

Munster (Ireland)	13–31	(Scotland) Glasgow Warriors
Try: Smith 37' c Con: Keatley (1/1); Pen: Keatley (2/3) 23', 48'	Report	Try: Harley 8' c Van der Merwe 25' c Pyrgos 31' c Russell 58' c Con: Russell (4/4); Pen: Weir (1/1) 73'

Kingspan Stadium
Attendance: 17,057
Referee: Nigel Owens (WRU)

FB	15	(Ireland) Felix Jones
RW	14	(Ireland) Keith Earls
OC	13	(Australia) Andrew Smith
IC	12	(Ireland) Denis Hurley (c)
LW	11	(Ireland) Simon Zebo	(substituted off) 56'
FH	10	(Ireland) Ian Keatley	(substituted off) 56'
SH	9	(Ireland) Duncan Williams	(substituted off) 71'
N8	8	(Ireland) CJ Stander
OF	7	(Ireland) Paddy Butler	10' to 19'		(substituted off) 71'
BF	6	(Ireland) Donnacha Ryan
RL	5	(Ireland) Paul O'Connell
LL	4	(Ireland) Billy Holland	(substituted off) 60'
TP	3	(South Africa) BJ Botha	(substituted off) 60'
HK	2	(Argentina) Eusebio Guiñazú	(substituted off) 62'
LP	1	(Ireland) Dave Kilcoyne	(substituted off) 62'
Replacements:
HK	16	(Ireland) Duncan Casey	(substituted in) 62'
PR	17	(Ireland) James Cronin	(substituted in) 62'
PR	18	(Ireland) Stephen Archer	(substituted in) 60'
FL	19	(Ireland) Sean Dougall	(substituted in) 10'	(substituted off) 19'	(substituted in) 71'
N8	20	(Ireland) Jack O'Donoghue	(substituted in) 60'
SH	21	(Ireland) Cathal Sheridan	(substituted in) 71'
FH	22	(Ireland) JJ Hanrahan	(substituted in) 56'
WG	23	(Ireland) Ronan O'Mahony	(substituted in) 56'
Coach:
(Ireland) Anthony Foley

FB	15	(Scotland) Stuart Hogg	(substituted off) 62'
RW	14	(Scotland) Tommy Seymour
OC	13	(Scotland) Richie Vernon
IC	12	(Scotland) Peter Horne
LW	11	(Canada) D. T. H. van der Merwe	(substituted off) 70'
FH	10	(Scotland) Finn Russell	(substituted off) 66'
SH	9	(Scotland) Henry Pyrgos
N8	8	(Scotland) Josh Strauss (c)
OF	7	(Scotland) Ryan Wilson
BF	6	(Scotland) Rob Harley	(substituted off) 60'
RL	5	(Scotland) Jonny Gray
LL	4	(Fiji) Leone Nakarawa	(substituted off) 66'
TP	3	(South Africa) Rossouw de Klerk	(substituted off) 52'
HK	2	(Scotland) Dougie Hall	(substituted off) 62'
LP	1	(Scotland) Gordon Reid	(substituted off) 77'
Replacements:
HK	16	(Scotland) Fraser Brown	(substituted in) 62'
PR	17	(Fiji) Jerry Yanuyanutawa	(substituted in) 77'
PR	18	(Scotland) Jon Welsh	(substituted in) 52'
LK	19	(Scotland) Alastair Kellock	(substituted in) 66'
FL	20	(Scotland) Chris Fusaro	(substituted in) 60'
SH	21	(Fiji) Nikola Matawalu	(substituted in) 70'
FH	22	(Scotland) Duncan Weir	(substituted in) 66'
WG	23	(Scotland) Sean Lamont	(substituted in) 62'
Coach:
(Scotland) Gregor Townsend

Man of the Match:
(Fiji) Leone Nakarawa (Glasgow Warriors)

Touch judges:
Ian Davies (WRU)
Sean Brickell (WRU)
Television match official:
Derek Bevan (WRU)
