= 2014–15 Pro12 =

Professional rugby union competition

- Countries: Ireland; Italy; Scotland; Wales
- Date: 5 September 2014 – 30 May 2015
- Champions: (Scotland) Glasgow Warriors (1st title)
- Runners-up: (Ireland) Munster
- Matches played: 135
- Attendance: 1,159,127 (average 8,586 per match)
- Tries scored: 587 (average 4.3 per match)
- Top point scorer: Ian Keatley (Munster) (184 points)
- Top try scorer: Rhys Webb (Ospreys) (12 tries)

Official website
- www.pro12rugby.com

The 2014–15 Pro12 (also known as the Guinness Pro12 for sponsorship reasons) was the 14th season of the professional rugby union competition originally known as the Celtic League, and the fifth with its current four-country format.

It was the first season to be referred to as the Pro12 to not have RaboDirect as the title sponsor, having been replaced by Guinness.

Leinster were the defending champions having beaten Glasgow Warriors in the previous season's playoff final, to become the first team in the league to successfully retain the trophy. Leinster were unable to defend their title as they failed to qualify for the end-of-season playoffs for the top four teams after the regular season. Glasgow Warriors finished the regular season on top of the table, and were crowned champions for the first time, beating second seeded team Munster 31–13 in the final. Thus, the Warriors became the first Scottish team to win a professional trophy, beating Edinburgh's appearance in the final of the 2014–15 European Rugby Challenge Cup.

The twelve competing teams were the four Irish teams, Connacht, Leinster, Munster and Ulster; two Italian teams, Benetton Treviso and Zebre; two Scottish teams, Edinburgh and Glasgow Warriors and four Welsh teams, Cardiff Blues, Newport Gwent Dragons, Ospreys and Scarlets.

The Guinness PRO12 Trophy is a 60 cm tall piece handmade made by silversmith Thomas Lyte from 8.3 kg of sterling silver, with league branding highlighted in gold plate.

== Changes for the season ==
=== All countries ===
With the Heineken Cup being replaced by the 20-team European Rugby Champions Cup in the 2014–15 season, the Pro12 table had a greater impact on qualification. Though the qualification was decided by the league table in the 2013–14 season, teams were not aware this would be the case until April 2014.

Under the previous format, the Pro12 provided a minimum of ten teams, with Scotland and Italy providing two teams each, and Ireland and Wales both providing three. The new system saw one place now being reserved for the highest finishing Pro12 team from each of four participating countries and three other qualifiers based solely on league position, for a total of seven teams. The other teams were entered in the new second-tier competition, the European Rugby Challenge Cup.

Starting in the 2015–16 competition, the 20th tournament spot will be decided by a playoff involving the Pro12's highest-finishing team that has not already qualified, the seventh highest finishing club from France's Top 14 and the seventh highest finishing club from the English Premiership. The play-off was initially planned to involve two Pro12 teams, but that plan was scrapped due to fixture clashes with the Top 14.

=== Ireland ===
Connacht entered the season with a new captain following the forced retirement of Craig Clarke due to persistent concussions. John Muldoon was confirmed as the new captain in August 2014. They were also without the playing services of former captain and centurion Gavin Duffy, whose contract was not renewed the previous season. It was later announced that he had taken up a role with the province's commercial team.

Leinster came into the competition without the services of long serving player Brian O'Driscoll, who retired at the end of the 2013–14 season, for the first time. O'Driscoll had played in every previous season of the league. They were also without last year's captain Leo Cullen on the playing field, as he also retired, taking up the role of forwards coach. Irish international Jamie Heaslip was announced as the side's new captain in August 2014, with Rob Kearney and Seán O'Brien serving as his vice-captains.

Following the departure of last year's head coach Rob Penney, who took up a role with the Japanese side NTT Communications Shining Arcs, Munster were coached by former player and previous season's forwards coach Anthony Foley. Foley was joined in the coaching staff by his fellow former Munster players Mick O'Driscoll and Jerry Flannery, as well as Cork Constitution head coach Brian Walsh.

Ulster entered the season with their home stadium, the Kingspan Stadium redeveloped, with the stadium's capacity having been increased to 18,196. In June 2014, David Humphreys left his post as the province's Director of Rugby, joining English Premiership side Gloucester. Later that month, it was announced that head coach Mark Anscombe would also leave the province "with immediate effect". Ireland assistant coach Les Kiss filled the role of Director of Rugby on an interim basis. In October 2014, Kiss returned to his position with the Ireland team, with Neil Doak taking the role of head coach. It was announced that Kiss would return to his role with Ulster on a full-time basis following the 2015 World Cup. In addition to the changes in the coaching staff, Ulster entered the season with Rory Best reinstated as captain, following the retirement of Johann Muller at the end of the previous season.

=== Italy ===
Despite threats during the previous season that the team would be pulled out of the competition, Benetton Treviso returned for their fifth season in the league. Following the resignation of Franco Smith during the course of the previous season, Umberto Casellato took over as the side's head coach. Casellato joined the side from Zebre where he had served as assistant coach.

=== Scotland ===
Ahead of the 2014–15 season, Edinburgh lost a number of experienced players, including Geoff Cross, Nick De Luca, Greig Laidlaw and Ross Rennie. The departure of Laidlaw meant Edinburgh came into the competition with a new captain, and in September 2014, Mike Coman was named as skipper. Edinburgh's home ground of Murrayfield was resurfaced by the time the new season began, following an infestation of nematodes, a type of parasitic worm. In addition to being resurfaced, Murrayfield was renamed under a naming rights agreement with the BT Group. The deal saw the ground referred to as 'BT Murrayfield Stadium'.

=== Wales ===
Beginning in 2014–15, the BT Group became the main sponsor on the shirts of three of the four Welsh teams, sponsoring Newport Gwent Dragons, Ospreys and Scarlets, while Cardiff Blues had their home stadium of Cardiff Arms Park renamed under a deal with the group, which saw it referred to officially as 'BT Sport Cardiff Arms Park'.

Cardiff Blues entered the season under new leadership, with Mark Hammett coming in as director of rugby. Dale McIntosh and Paul John stay on as coaches under him. Hammett joined from New Zealand Super Rugby franchise, the Hurricanes. The Blues were without Leigh Halfpenny, whose departure to Toulon was announced in January 2014. Wales captain Sam Warburton continued playing with the side as the first centrally contracted player in Wales, having signed a deal with the Welsh Rugby Union in January 2014. It was also announced that, following his recovery from testicular cancer, Matthew Rees would continue to serve as the team's captain.

Newport Gwent Dragons entered the season with a new captain. Former Lions player Lee Byrne took over from Andrew Coombs on his return from Clermont Auvergne and the Top 14. He previously played for rival regions Scarlets and Ospreys.

Like most regions, Ospreys entered the season having lost experienced international players. Ian Evans and Richard Hibbard were among the players to have departed, with the pair joining Bristol and Gloucester respectively. The team also lost experienced player Adam Jones. Jones, who had played in every season for the region since its foundation, stayed within Welsh rugby with a move to Cardiff Blues.

Scarlets entered the season with a new head coach, following Simon Easterby's exit. Easterby left the side to become forwards coach to Ireland, working under Joe Schmidt. His replacement was Wayne Pivac, with Pivac joining the region from ITM Cup side Auckland. Scarlets were also without the services of one of the previous season's joint captains Jonathan Davies, who departed to join French side Clermont Auvergne. The side was captained by Welsh international Ken Owens, with Scott Williams serving as his deputy in the role.

== Preseason friendlies ==
Match results
Date	Venue	Team	Score	Team	Referee
8 August 2014	Complexe Lavedrine	Clermont (France)	42–7	(Ireland) Connacht	Christophe Berdos (FFR)
13 August 2014	Stadio Comunale di Monigo	Benetton Treviso (Italy)	12–0	(Italy) Mogliano	Claudio Blessano (FIR)
15 August 2014	Cardiff Arms Park	Cardiff Blues (Wales)	17–24	(England) Exeter Chiefs	Neil Hennessy (WRU)
15 August 2014	Sixways Stadium	Worcester Warriors (England)	23–6	(Wales) Ospreys	Luke Pearce (RFU)
16 August 2014	Recreation Ground	Bath (England)	26–26	(Wales) Scarlets	Greg Garner (RFU)
17 August 2014	Clifton RFC	Bristol (England)	19–34	(Wales) Newport Gwent Dragons	Simon Harding (RFU)
21 August 2014	Artillery Ground	Saracens (England)	39–5	(Wales) Ospreys	Andrew small (RFU)
22 August 2014	Stadio Comunale Mario Battaglini	Rovigo (Italy)	21–17	(Italy) Benetton Treviso	Giuseppe Vivarini (FIR)
22 August 2014	Kingspan Stadium	Ulster (Ireland)	21–22	(England) Exeter Chiefs	Gary Conway (IRFU)
23 August 2014	Castelnovo ne' Monti	Calvisano (Italy)	21–42	(Italy) Zebre	Claudio Blessano (FIR)
23 August 2014	Melrose RFC	Edinburgh (Scotland)	10–11	(England) Leicester Tigers	Andrew McMenemy (SRU)
23 August 2014	Scotstoun Stadium	Glasgow Warriors (Scotland)	23–24	(England) Harlequins	Neil Paterson (SRU)
23 August 2014	Kingsholm Stadium	Gloucester (England)	45–8	(Ireland) Munster	Greg Garner (RFU)
23 August 2014	Franklin's Gardens	Northampton Saints (England)	33–21	(Ireland) Leinster	Luke Pearce (RFU)
23 August 2014	Adams Park	Wasps (England)	28–18	(Ireland) Connacht	Tim Wigglesworth (RFU)
24 August 2014	Regentsholme	Lydney (England)	0–36	(Wales) Newport Gwent Dragons	
28 August 2014	Stadio Plebiscito	Petrarca (Italy)	12–19	(Italy) Benetton Treviso	Marius Mitrea (FIR)
29 August 2014	Welford Road	Leicester Tigers (England)	21–17	(Wales) Cardiff Blues	Matt Carley (RFU)
29 August 2014	Waterford Regional Sports Centre	Munster (Ireland)	17–5	(England) London Irish	David Wilkinson (IRFU)
29 August 2014	Mansfield Park	Newcastle Falcons (England)	15–21	(Scotland) Edinburgh	
29 August 2014	Eugene Cross Park	Northampton Saints (England)	25–27	(Wales) Newport Gwent Dragons	Ian Davies (Wales)
29 August 2014	Stadio Comunale Mario Battaglini	Rovigo (Italy)	7–27	(Italy) Zebre	Giuseppe Vivarini (FIR)
30 August 2014	Tallaght Stadium	Leinster (Ireland)	7–10	(Ireland) Ulster	George Clancy (IRFU)
30 August 2014	Richmond Athletic Ground	London Scottish (England)	19–38	(Scotland) Glasgow Warriors	Ian Tempest (RFU)
30 August 2014	Parc y Scarlets	Scarlets (Wales)	29–24	(England) Gloucester	Nigel Owens (WRU)

== Teams ==
Location of 2014–15 Pro12 teams in Great Britain and Ireland.	Location of 2014–15 Pro12 teams in Italy
Winners; 2nd–4th place; Other teams.

Team	Coach / Director of Rugby	Captain	Stadium	Capacity
(Italy) Benetton Treviso	(Italy) Umberto Casellato	(Italy) Antonio Pavanello	Stadio Comunale di Monigo	6,700
(Wales) Cardiff Blues	(Wales) Paul John (Wales) Dale McIntosh (For (New Zealand) Mark Hammett) (Note: Mark Hammett began the tournament as Cardiff Blues head coach, but resigned for personal reasons on 25 February 2015, and was replaced by his assistants Paul John and Dale McIntosh.)	(Wales) Matthew Rees	Cardiff Arms Park	12,500
(Ireland) Connacht	(Samoa) Pat Lam	(Ireland) John Muldoon	Galway Sportsgrounds	7,800
(Scotland) Edinburgh	(South Africa) Alan Solomons	(New Zealand) Mike Coman	Murrayfield Stadium	67,144 (Note: Although Murrayfield's full capacity is 67,144, only the lower section of the West Stand, with a capacity of 12,464, is generally opened for Edinburgh fixtures.)
(Scotland) Glasgow Warriors	(Scotland) Gregor Townsend	(Scotland) Alastair Kellock	Scotstoun Stadium	10,000
(Ireland) Leinster	(Australia) Matt O'Connor	(Ireland) Jamie Heaslip	RDS Arena; Aviva Stadium	18,500; 51,700
(Ireland) Munster	(Ireland) Anthony Foley	(Ireland) Peter O'Mahony	Thomond Park; Musgrave Park	25,600; 9,251
(Wales) Newport Gwent Dragons	(Wales) Lyn Jones	(Wales) Lee Byrne	Rodney Parade	11,676
(Wales) Ospreys	(Wales) Steve Tandy	(Wales) Alun Wyn Jones	Liberty Stadium	20,532
(Wales) Scarlets	(New Zealand) Wayne Pivac	(Wales) Ken Owens	Parc y Scarlets	14,870
(Ireland) Ulster	(Ireland) Neil Doak	(Ireland) Rory Best	Kingspan Stadium	18,196
(Italy) Zebre	(Argentina) Víctor Jiménez (For (Italy) Andrea Cavinato) (Note: Andrea Cavinato began the tournament as Zebre head coach, but was sacked on 21 February 2015, and replaced by Víctor Jiménez.)	(Italy) Marco Bortolami	Stadio XXV Aprile (Note: Renamed Stadio Sergio Lanfranchi in January 2015)	5,000

== Table ==
Pro12 Table
	Team	Played	Won	Drawn	Lost	Points For	Points Against	Points Difference	Tries For	Tries Against	Try Bonus	Losing Bonus	Points
1	(Scotland) Glasgow Warriors (CH)	22	16	1	5	540	360	+180	63	33	9	0	75
2	(Ireland) Munster (RU)	22	15	2	5	581	367	+214	68	31	8	3	75
3	(Wales) Ospreys (SF)	22	16	1	5	546	358	+188	53	30	6	2	74
4	(Ireland) Ulster (SF)	22	14	2	6	524	372	+152	59	34	6	3	69
5	(Ireland) Leinster	22	11	3	8	483	375	+108	54	39	8	4	62
6	(Wales) Scarlets	22	11	3	8	452	388	+64	43	39	4	3	57
7	(Ireland) Connacht	22	10	1	11	447	419	+28	49	48	3	5	50
8	(Scotland) Edinburgh	22	10	1	11	399	419	−20	41	48	3	3	48
9	(Wales) Newport Gwent Dragons	22	8	0	14	393	484	−91	38	55	4	6	42
10	(Wales) Cardiff Blues	22	7	1	14	430	545	−115	46	57	3	2	35
11	(Italy) Benetton Treviso	22	3	1	18	306	641	−335	34	81	2	3	19
12	(Italy) Zebre	22	3	0	19	266	639	−373	27	80	0	3	15
If teams are level at any stage, tiebreakers are applied in the following order: 1. number of matches won; 2. the difference between points for and points against; 3. the number of tries scored; 4. the most points scored; 5. the difference between tries for and tries against; 6. the fewest red cards received; 7. the fewest yellow cards received.
Green background (rows 1 to 4) are play-off places, and earn a place in the 2015–16 European Rugby Champions Cup. Blue background indicates teams outside the play-off places, that earn a place in the European Rugby Champions Cup. The top team from each country will qualify. Yellow background indicates the team that advances to a play-off semi-final against Aviva Premiership side Gloucester, who qualified for the play-off as the 2014–15 European Rugby Challenge Cup winners. Plain background indicates teams that earn a place in the 2015–16 European Rugby Challenge Cup.

== Fixtures ==
All times are local.

=== Round 1 ===
5 September 2014
19:35

(1 BP) Munster (Ireland)	13–14	(Scotland) Edinburgh
Try: Stander (2) 35' m, 59' m Pen: Keatley (1/2) 69'	Report	Try: Cuthbert 47' m Pen: Heathcote (3/5) 3', 8', 40'

Thomond Park
Attendance: 13,428
Referee: Leighton Hodges (WRU)

5 September 2014
19:35

(1 BP) Ospreys (Wales)	44–13	(Italy) Benetton Treviso
Try: Smith 20' c Webb 40' c Hassler 49' c Baldwin 54' c Dirksen 79' c Con: Biggar (4/4); Davies (1/1); Pen: Biggar (3/3) 6', 9', 32'	Report	Try: Fuser 64' c Con: Carlisle (1/1); Pen: Carlisle (2/2) 14', 27'

Liberty Stadium
Attendance: 6,213
Referee: David Wilkinson (IRFU)

6 September 2014
14:40

(1 BP) Scarlets (Wales)	32–32	(Ireland) Ulster (1 BP)
Try: Robinson 1' c Pitman 25' c G. Davies (2) 38' c, 63' m Con: Priestland (3/4); Pen: Priestland (2/2) 11', 45'	Report	Try: Van der Merwe 8' c Tuohy 13' m Ludik 67' c Trimble 78' c Con: Humphreys (3/4); Pen: Humphreys (2/2) 30', 48'

Parc y Scarlets
Attendance: 6,531
Referee: Peter Fitzgibbon (IRFU)

6 September 2014
17:00

Connacht (Ireland)	16–11	(Wales) Newport Gwent Dragons (1 BP)
Try: E. McKeon 9' m Poolman 54' m Pen: Leader (2/3) 15', 51'	Report	Try: Cudd 23' m Pen: Tovey (2/3) 30', 75'

Galway Sportsgrounds
Attendance: 4,123
Referee: Marius Mitrea (FIR)

6 September 2014
17:15

Glasgow Warriors (Scotland)	22–20	(Ireland) Leinster (1 BP)
Try: Horne 16' c Gray 23' m Strauss 30' c Con: Pyrgos (2/3); Pen: Hogg (1/1) 80'	Report	Try: J. McGrath 71' c Denton 73' c Con: Gopperth (2/2); Pen: Madigan (1/1) 33'; Gopperth (1/2) 51'

Scotstoun Stadium
Attendance: 5,725
Referee: Nigel Owens (WRU)

7 September 2014
17:00

Zebre (Italy)	26–41	(Wales) Cardiff Blues (1 BP)
Try: Leonard 20' m Ferrarini 32' c Berryman 44' m Con: Orquera (1/3); Pen: Orquera (1/2) 11'; Haimona (2/2) 54', 62'	Report	Try: Patchell 9' c L. Williams 13' c Fish 47' c Cuthbert 50' c Dacey 66' c Con: Patchell (5/5); Pen: Patchell (2/3) 40', 69'

Stadio XXV Aprile
Attendance: 2,800
Referee: Andrew McMenemy (SRU)

=== Round 2 ===
12 September 2014
20:00

Benetton Treviso (Italy)	10–21	(Ireland) Munster
Try: Ragusi 17' c Con: Carlisle (1/1); Pen: Carlisle (1/3) 63'	Report	Try: Stander 28' c Zebo 50' m Con: Keatley (1/2); Pen: Keatley (3/3) 2', 25', 70'

Stadio Comunale di Monigo
Attendance: 3,491
Referee: Andrew McMenemy (SRU)

12 September 2014
19:35

(1 BP) Edinburgh (Scotland)	13–14	(Ireland) Connacht
Try: du Preez 40' c Con: Heathcote (1/1); Pen: Heathcote (2/3) 3', 9'	Report	Try: Faloon 75' m Pen: Leader (3/5) 23', 37', 55'

Murrayfield Stadium
Attendance: 3,777
Referee: Gary Conway (IRFU)

12 September 2014
19:35

(1 BP) Newport Gwent Dragons (Wales)	15–17	(Wales) Ospreys
Pen: Tovey (1/1) 14'; O'Brien (4/4) 45', 50', 71', 74'	Report	Try: Walker 36' c Webb 47' c Con: Biggar (2/2); Pen: Biggar (1/1) 29'

Rodney Parade
Attendance: 7,199
Referee: Nigel Owens (WRU)

12 September 2014
19:35

(1 BP) Ulster (Ireland)	33–13	(Italy) Zebre
Try: Williams 4' c Gilroy 16' c Diack 26' m Trimble 59' c Tuohy 65' c Con: Humphreys (4/5)	Report	Try: Vunisa 7' c Con: Haimona (1/1); Pen: Haimona (2/3) 11', 70'

Kingspan Stadium
Attendance: 13,835
Referee: Leighton Hodges (WRU)

13 September 2014
14:40

(1 BP) Leinster (Ireland)	42–12	(Wales) Scarlets
Try: R. Kearney (2) 8' c, 27' c Madigan (2) 34' c, 52' c Ryan 57' c Furlong 69' c Con: Madigan (6/6)	Report	Try: S. Williams 13' m Snyman 80' c Con: S. Shingler (1/1)

RDS Arena
Attendance: 16,108
Referee: Marius Mitrea (FIR)

14 September 2014
16:00

Cardiff Blues (Wales)	12–33	(Scotland) Glasgow Warriors
Pen: Patchell (4/6) 3', 18', 47', 56'	Report	Try: Lamont 32' c Matawalu (2) 57' c, 67' c Con: Pyrgos (1/1); Weir (2/2); Pen: Pyrgos (2/2) 7', 12'; Weir (2/2) 62', 66'

Cardiff Arms Park
Attendance: 6,897
Referee: John Lacey (IRFU)

=== Round 3 ===
19 September 2014
19:30

(1 BP) Munster (Ireland)	31–5	(Italy) Zebre
Try: Zebo (3) 14' m, 30' m, 36' c Smith 43' c Kilcoyne 64' c Con: Hanrahan (3/4)	Report	Try: Vunisa 80' m

Thomond Park
Attendance: 12,488
Referee: Ian Davies (WRU)

19 September 2014
19:35

Cardiff Blues (Wales)	9–26	(Ireland) Ulster
Pen: Patchell (3/4) 21', 27', 35'	Report	Try: Tuohy 51' c Humphreys 74' c Con: Jackson (1/1); Humphreys (1/1); Pen: Jackson (4/5) 7', 29', 33', 40'

Cardiff Arms Park
Attendance: 7,041
Referee: Neil Paterson (SRU)

19 September 2014
19:35

Connacht (Ireland)	10–9	(Ireland) Leinster (1 BP)
Try: Marmion 54' c Con: Carty (1/1); Pen: Carty (1/2) 21'	Report	Pen: Madigan (3/4) 2', 11', 15'

Galway Sportsgrounds
Attendance: 5,917
Referee: John Lacey (IRFU)

20 September 2014
14:40

Newport Gwent Dragons (Wales)	13–33	(Scotland) Glasgow Warriors (1 BP)
Try: Rees 57' c Con: O'Brien (1/1); Pen: O'Brien (2/3) 23', 46'	Report	Try: Dunbar 4' c Strauss 54' c Seymour 68' m Swinson 77' m Con: Weir (2/4); Pen: Weir (2/2) 18', 48'; Hogg (1/1) 28'

Rodney Parade
Attendance: 5,885
Referee: David Wilkinson (IRFU)

20 September 2014
18:00

(1 BP) Scarlets (Wales)	43–0	(Italy) Benetton Treviso
Try: E. Phillips 1' c G. Davies (2) 15' m, 37' c Li. Williams (2) 45' m, 51' c Snyman 48' c Owen 63' m Con: Priestland (4/6)	Report

Parc y Scarlets
Attendance: 5,791
Referee: Matteo Liperini (FIR)

21 September 2014
16:00

(1 BP) Ospreys (Wales)	62–13	(Scotland) Edinburgh
Try: Webb (2) 1' c, 11' c Baker 32' c Biggar 45' c Hassler 49' m Spratt 61' m Dirksen 69' c Grabham 72' c Ardron 76' c Con: Biggar (4/6); Davies (3/3); Pen: Biggar (1/1) 40'	Report	Try: Watson 36' c Con: Heathcote (1/1); Pen: Heathcote (2/2) 8', 43'

Liberty Stadium
Attendance: 6,340
Referee: Peter Fitzgibbon (IRFU)

=== Round 4 ===
26 September 2014
19:35

Edinburgh (Scotland)	20–20	(Wales) Scarlets
Try: Visser 35' c Burleigh 72' c Con: Heathcote (2/2); Pen: Heathcote (2/3) 8', 50'	Report	Try: Robinson 1' c Li. Williams 31' c Con: Priestland (2/2); Pen: Priestland (2/3) 11', 44'

Murrayfield Stadium
Attendance: 3,328
Referee: John Lacey (IRFU)

26 September 2014
19:35

(1 BP) Glasgow Warriors (Scotland)	39–21	(Ireland) Connacht
Try: Hogg (2) 19' c, 46' m Pyrgos 36' c Van der Merwe 61' c Bennett 74' c Con: Weir (4/5); Pen: Weir (2/2) 30', 71'	Report	Try: McSharry 23' c Leader 56' c Penalty try 68' c Con: Porter (3/3)

Scotstoun Stadium
Attendance: 5,821
Referee: Claudio Blessano (FIR)

26 September 2014
19:35

(1 BP) Leinster (Ireland)	37–23	(Wales) Cardiff Blues
Try: Ruddock 37' c M. McGrath 46' c D'Arcy 51' c L. McGrath 80' c Con: Madigan (4/4); Pen: Madigan (3/4) 4', 8', 72'	Report	Try: Allen 62' c Warburton 65' c Con: Patchell (2/2); Pen: Patchell (3/4) 18', 29', 40'

RDS Arena
Attendance: 12,540
Referee: Ian Davies (WRU)

27 September 2014
16:00

Zebre (Italy)	13–6	(Ireland) Ulster (1 BP)
Try: Chistolini 44' c Con: Haimona (1/1); Pen: Haimona (1/1) 68'; Drop: Haimona (1/1) 72'	Report	Pen: Humphreys (2/2) 50', 53'

Stadio XXV Aprile
Attendance: 2,269
Referee: Dudley Phillips (IRFU)

27 September 2014
18:30

(1 BP) Munster (Ireland)	14–19	(Wales) Ospreys
Try: Van den Heever 11' m Pen: Keatley (3/4) 40', 41', 56'	Report	Try: Hassler 15' c Con: Biggar (1/1); Pen: Biggar (4/4) 32', 53', 65', 69'

Thomond Park
Attendance: 13,547
Referee: Neil Hennessy (WRU)

28 September 2014
16:00

(1 BP) Newport Gwent Dragons (Wales)	33–15	(Italy) Benetton Treviso
Try: Amos (2) 11' c, 16' c Smith 42' m J. Evans 46' m Con: Tovey (2/4); Pen: Tovey (3/4) 3', 61', 80'	Report	Try: Luamanu 52' m Auva'a 60' c Con: Carlisle (1/2); Pen: Carlisle (1/2) 29'

Rodney Parade
Attendance: 5,162
Referee: Andrew McMenemy (SRU)

=== Round 5 ===
3 October 2014
19:35

Connacht (Ireland)	24–24	(Wales) Cardiff Blues
Try: Henshaw 31' c Marmion 42' c White 46' c Con: Ronaldson (3/3); Pen: Ronaldson (1/1) 6'	Report	Try: A. Thomas 19' c Cook 69' c Andrews 78' c Con: Patchell (3/3); Pen: Patchell (1/1) 36'

Galway Sportsgrounds
Attendance: 5,247
Referee: Neil Paterson (SRU)

3 October 2014
19:35

(1 BP) Ulster (Ireland)	30–0	(Scotland) Edinburgh
Try: Trimble (2) 25' c, 78' m Williams 61' m Best 68' c Con: Jackson (1/1); Olding (1/3); Pen: Jackson (2/3) 13', 39'	Report

Kingspan Stadium
Attendance: 15,479
Referee: Claudio Blessano (FIR)

3 October 2014
20:35

(1 BP) Zebre (Italy)	14–15	(Wales) Ospreys
Try: Bisegni 4' m Pen: Garcia (3/4) 23', 43', 69'	Report	Pen: Davies (5/9) 13', 37', 52', 66', 71'

Stadio XXV Aprile
Attendance: 2,812
Referee: Lloyd Linton (SRU)

4 October 2014
18:30

Leinster (Ireland)	23–34	(Ireland) Munster
Try: Fanning 62' c Penalty try 69' c Con: Madigan (2/2); Pen: Madigan (3/3) 2', 12', 35'	Report	Try: Cronin 18' m Copeland 31' c Keatley 37' c Con: Keatley (2/3); Pen: Keatley (4/5) 4', 16', 24', 66'; Hanrahan (1/1) 76'

Aviva Stadium
Attendance: 43,817
Referee: Ian Davies (WRU)

5 October 2014
15:00

Benetton Treviso (Italy)	23–40	(Scotland) Glasgow Warriors (1 BP)
Try: Campagnaro (2) 8' c, 62' c Con: Carlisle (1/1); Hayward (1/1); Pen: Carlisle (3/4) 1', 32', 38'	Report	Try: Seymour (2) 13' m, 27' c Holmes 23' c Eddie 48' c Van der Merwe 54' c Lamont 56' c Con: Weir (3/4); Russell (2/2)

Stadio Comunale di Monigo
Attendance: 2,382
Referee: Gary Conway (IRFU)

5 October 2014
16:00

Scarlets (Wales)	26–13	(Wales) Newport Gwent Dragons
Try: Owen 16' c K. Phillips 64' c Con: Priestland (2/2); Pen: Priestland (3/3) 12', 14', 54'; S. Shingler (1/1) 77'	Report	Try: Rees 71' c Con: O'Brien (1/1); Pen: Tovey (2/2) 9', 63'

Parc y Scarlets
Attendance: 7,124
Referee: George Clancy (IRFU)

=== Round 6 ===
10 October 2014
20:00

(1 BP) Benetton Treviso (Italy)	6–9	(Ireland) Connacht
Pen: Hayward (2/3) 6', 38'	Report	Pen: Ronaldson (3/5) 17', 30', 67'

Stadio Comunale di Monigo
Attendance: 3,025
Referee: David Wilkinson (IRFU)

10 October 2014
19:35

Munster (Ireland)	17–6	(Wales) Scarlets
Try: Smith 24' m Pen: Hanrahan (4/6) 21', 42', 48', 60'	Report	Pen: Priestland (1/3) 38'; Drop: Priestland (1/1) 1'

Thomond Park
Attendance: 13,851
Referee: Claudio Blessano (FIR)

11 October 2014
14:40

Edinburgh (Scotland)	24–10	(Wales) Newport Gwent Dragons
Try: Visser 47' c Fife 55' m Con: Heathcote (1/2); Pen: Heathcote (4/4) 33', 37', 46', 63'	Report	Try: Pewtner 43' c Con: Tovey (1/1); Pen: O'Brien (1/2) 60'

Murrayfield Stadium
Attendance: 3,156
Referee: Dudley Phillips (IRFU)

11 October 2014
16:00

Zebre (Italy)	3–20	(Ireland) Leinster
Pen: Orquera (1/1) 25'	Report	Try: Madigan 44' c L. McGrath 67' c Con: Madigan (1/1); Gopperth (1/1); Pen: Madigan (2/3) 40', 49'

Stadio XXV Aprile
Attendance: 2,518
Referee: Neil Paterson (SRU)

11 October 2014
17:05

Ulster (Ireland)	29–9	(Scotland) Glasgow Warriors
Try: Gilroy 66' c Bowe 69' c Con: Humphreys (2/2); Pen: Humphreys (5/6) 10', 16', 21', 31', 36'	Report	Pen: Russell (3/3) 7', 18', 43'

Kingspan Stadium
Attendance: 16,260
Referee: Nigel Owens (WRU)

12 October 2014
16:00

Ospreys (Wales)	26–15	(Wales) Cardiff Blues
Try: D. Evans 27' c Webb 51' c Con: Biggar (2/2); Pen: Biggar (4/4) 2', 6', 11', 21'	Report	Try: L. Williams 77' m Dacey 80' c Con: Patchell (1/2); Pen: Patchell (1/1) 25'

Liberty Stadium
Attendance: 10,821
Referee: Leighton Hodges (WRU)

=== Round 7 ===
31 October 2014
19:35

Glasgow Warriors (Scotland)	17–9	(Italy) Benetton Treviso
Try: Matawalu 19' m Pen: Horne (4/6) 24', 36', 67', 79'	Report	Pen: Hayward (3/4) 29', 38', 54'

Scotstoun Stadium
Attendance: 5,901
Referee: Ian Davies (WRU)

31 October 2014
19:35

(1 BP) Leinster (Ireland)	33–8	(Scotland) Edinburgh
Try: Ryan (2) 3' m, 52' c Conan 12' c Marshall 63' c M. McGrath 79' c Con: Gopperth (4/5)	Report	Try: Leonardi 75' m Pen: Heathcote (1/3) 23'

RDS Arena
Attendance: 15,077
Referee: Nigel Owens (WRU)

31 October 2014
19:35

Ospreys (Wales)	26–11	(Ireland) Connacht
Try: Hassler 48' c Roberts 61' c Con: Davies (2/2); Pen: Davies (4/6) 4', 51', 56', 66'	Report	Try: E. McKeon 77' m Pen: Ronaldson (2/5) 36', 46'

Liberty Stadium
Attendance: 6,010
Referee: John Lacey (IRFU)

1 November 2014
17:15

(1 BP) Cardiff Blues (Wales)	24–28	(Ireland) Munster
Try: Amorosino 33' m Vosawai 62' c Con: G. Davies (1/2); Pen: Patchell (3/4) 8', 13', 23'; G. Davies (1/1) 73'	Report	Try: Butler 77' c Con: J. Holland (1/1); Pen: Hanrahan (7/7) 2', 10', 15', 19', 32', 39', 69'

Cardiff Arms Park
Attendance: 6,902
Referee: Marius Mitrea (FIR)

1 November 2014
18:00

Scarlets (Wales)	28–13	(Italy) Zebre
Try: Hughes 60' c Con: S. Shingler (1/1); Pen: S. Shingler (7/8) 6', 15', 28', 33', 42', 47', 78'	Report	Try: Bernabò 29' c Con: Padovani (1/1); Pen: Padovani (2/3) 18', 25'

Parc y Scarlets
Attendance: 5,342
Referee: Gary Conway (IRFU)

1 November 2014
19:35

Ulster (Ireland)	23–6	(Wales) Newport Gwent Dragons
Try: Olding (2) 29' m, 46' m Fitzpatrick 80' c Con: Humphreys (1/1); Pen: Jackson (2/2) 25', 28'	Report	Pen: O'Brien (2/2) 34', 59'

Kingspan Stadium
Attendance: 13,501
Referee: Matteo Liperini (FIR)

=== Round 8 ===
21 November 2014
19:30

Newport Gwent Dragons (Wales)	12–38	(Ireland) Munster (1 BP)
Pen: G. Jones (4/5) 5', 19', 32', 65'	Report	Try: Copeland 14' c Casey (2) 46' c, 72' c Smith 62' c R. O'Mahony 78' c Con: Keatley (5/5); Pen: Keatley (1/1) 43'

Rodney Parade
Attendance: 5,783
Referee: Matteo Liperini (FIR)

21 November 2014
19:35

(1 BP) Connacht (Ireland)	43–3	(Italy) Zebre
Try: Poolman 27' m Kearney 46' c Penalty try 61' c Jo. Cooney 65' m Carty 68' c Con: Porter (1/2); Nikora (1/1); Carty (1/2); Pen: Porter (4/6) 13', 19', 34', 38'	Report	Pen: Odiete (1/2) 17'

Galway Sportsgrounds
Attendance: 5,486
Referee: Ben Whitehouse (WRU)

21 November 2014
19:35

Scarlets (Wales)	19–9	(Scotland) Glasgow Warriors
Try: Pitman 76' c Con: S. Shingler (1/1); Pen: S. Shingler (4/4) 5', 13', 25', 63'	Report	Pen: Horne (3/3) 7', 44', 60'

Parc y Scarlets
Attendance: 6,038
Referee: David Wilkinson (IRFU)

21 November 2014
19:35

Ulster (Ireland)	25–16	(Wales) Ospreys
Try: Cave (2) 9' c, 78' c Van der Merwe 39' m Con: Jackson (1/2); Humphreys (1/1); Pen: Jackson (2/2) 19, 31'	Report	Try: Roberts 43' c Con: Davies (1/1); Pen: Davies (3/3) 32', 59', 61'

Kingspan Stadium
Attendance: 16,923
Referee: Neil Hennessy (WRU)

23 November 2014
15:30

(1 BP) Benetton Treviso (Italy)	24–24	(Ireland) Leinster (1 BP)
Try: Pratichetti 12' c Budd 25' m Barbini 50' c Giazzon 72' m Con: Hayward (2/4)	Report	Try: Fanning (2) 3' m, 67' c D. Kearney 29' m B. Byrne 41' c Con: Gopperth (2/4)

Stadio Comunale di Monigo
Attendance: 2,851
Referee: Neil Paterson (SRU)

23 November 2014
16:00

Edinburgh (Scotland)	28–13	(Wales) Cardiff Blues
Try: Strauss 7' c Fife 46' c Brown 57' m Con: Heathcote (2/3); Pen: Heathcote (3/4) 15', 24', 36'	Report	Try: A. Thomas 73' c Con: G. Davies (1/1); Pen: G. Davies (2/3) 12', 38'

Murrayfield Stadium
Attendance: 3,803
Referee: Leo Colgan (IRFU)

=== Round 9 ===
28 November 2014
19:35

(1 BP) Cardiff Blues (Wales)	36–25	(Italy) Benetton Treviso
Try: L. Williams 11' c Tuculet 28' m R. Smith 52' c Dacey 57' c Watts-Jones 71' c Con: Anscombe (1/2); G. Davies (3/3); Pen: G. Davies (1/1) 48'	Report	Try: Carlisle 22' c Minto (2) 60' c, 66' m Con: Carlisle (2/3); Pen: Carlisle (2/2) 8', 36'

Cardiff Arms Park
Attendance: 5,028
Referee: Andrew McMenemy (SRU)

28 November 2014
19:35

Munster (Ireland)	21–20	(Ireland) Ulster (1 BP)
Try: Copeland 29' m Williams 43' c Con: Keatley (1/2); Pen: Keatley (3/5) 23', 51', 54'	Report	Try: Williams 79' m Pen: Humphreys (5/5) 2', 10', 12', 20', 71'

Thomond Park
Attendance: 17,101
Referee: Ian Davies (WRU)

29 November 2014
16:00

Zebre (Italy)	18–10	(Scotland) Edinburgh
Try: Bisegni 62' c Visentin 70' m Con: Haimona (1/2); Pen: Haimona (2/4) 10', 53'	Report	Try: Grant 38' c Con: Heathcote (1/1); Pen: Heathcote (1/2) 44'

Stadio XXV Aprile
Attendance: 2,583
Referee: David Wilkinson (IRFU)

29 November 2014
17:15

Leinster (Ireland)	18–12	(Wales) Ospreys (1 BP)
Pen: Madigan (3/3) 9', 16', 21'; Gopperth (3/3) 52', 72', 79'	Report	Pen: Davies (4/4) 6', 30', 37', 58'

RDS Arena
Attendance: 15,928
Referee: Marius Mitrea (FIR)

29 November 2014
19:30

Connacht (Ireland)	14–8	(Wales) Scarlets (1 BP)
Try: Healy 48' m Pen: Carty (3/4) 19', 47', 63'	Report	Try: Robinson 3' m Pen: S. Shingler (1/2) 1'

Galway Sportsgrounds
Attendance: 5,631
Referee: Leighton Hodges (WRU)

30 November 2014
16:00

Glasgow Warriors (Scotland)	19–15	(Wales) Newport Gwent Dragons (1 BP)
Try: Penalty try 44' c Con: Weir (1/1); Pen: Weir (4/4) 7', 24', 60', 66'	Report	Pen: G. Jones (5/5) 5', 16', 28', 46', 71'

Scotstoun Stadium
Attendance: 5,289
Referee: Dudley Phillips (IRFU)

=== Round 10 ===
19 December 2014
19:35

Cardiff Blues (Wales)	21–9	(Wales) Scarlets
Try: Navidi (2) 17' c, 28' m Con: Anscombe (1/2); Pen: Anscombe (3/4) 6', 11', 32'	Report	Pen: Priestland (3/3) 23', 25', 49'

Cardiff Arms Park
Attendance: 9,443
Referee: Peter Fitzgibbon (IRFU)

19 December 2014
19:35

(1 BP) Edinburgh (Scotland)	48–0	(Italy) Benetton Treviso
Try: Hidalgo-Clyne 1' c Coman 24' c Nel 59' c Hart 62' c Grant 70' c Denton 80' c Con: Hidalgo-Clyne (3/3); Heathcote (3/3); Pen: Hidalgo-Clyne (2/3) 16', 50'	Report

Murrayfield Stadium
Attendance: 2,768
Referee: David Wilkinson (IRFU)

19 December 2014
19:35

Leinster (Ireland)	21–11	(Ireland) Connacht
Try: Jennings 12' m Kirchner 78' c Con: Gopperth (1/2); Pen: Gopperth (3/3) 16', 41', 49'	Report	Try: Naoupu 73' m Pen: Carty (2/3) 31', 40'

RDS Arena
Attendance: 16,007
Referee: Ian Davies (WRU)

20 December 2014
14:40

Glasgow Warriors (Scotland)	21–18	(Ireland) Munster (1 BP)
Try: Nakarawa 51' c Gray 72' m Con: Russell (1/2); Pen: Russell (3/5) 6', 18', 29'	Report	Try: Hanrahan 7' m Copeland 40' c Con: Hanrahan (1/2); Pen: Hanrahan (2/4) 26', 36'

Scotstoun Stadium
Attendance: 6,176
Referee: Leighton Hodges (WRU)

20 December 2014
17:15

(1 BP) Ospreys (Wales)	31–20	(Ireland) Ulster
Try: Biggar 17' c Webb (2) 36' c, 48' c Dirksen 55' c Con: Biggar (4/4); Pen: Biggar (1/1) 2'	Report	Try: Herring 59' c Bowe 67' c Con: Humphreys (2/2); Pen: Humphreys (2/2) 14', 43'

Liberty Stadium
Attendance: 6,395
Referee: Neil Paterson (SRU)

21 December 2014
16:00

Newport Gwent Dragons (Wales)	25–11	(Italy) Zebre
Try: Wardle 23' c Amos 45' m Landman 49' c Con: Prydie (2/3); Pen: Prydie (2/4) 5', 40'	Report	Try: Manici 53' m Pen: Haimona (2/3) 19', 29'

Rodney Parade
Attendance: 5,823
Referee: Gary Conway (IRFU)

=== Round 11 ===
26 December 2014
14:05

(1 BP) Cardiff Blues (Wales)	17–23	(Wales) Newport Gwent Dragons
Try: Hoeata 62' c Knoyle 69' c Con: Anscombe (2/2); Pen: G. Davies (1/3) 40'	Report	Try: Dee 30' c Penalty try 46' c Con: Prydie (2/2); Pen: Prydie (3/3) 16', 36', 74'

Cardiff Arms Park
Attendance: 10,900
Referee: Leighton Hodges (WRU)

26 December 2014
17:00

Munster (Ireland)	28–13	(Ireland) Leinster
Try: Stander 16' m Conway 44' c Da. O'Callaghan 62' c Con: Keatley (2/3); Pen: Keatley (3/4) 2', 31', 54'	Report	Try: Jennings 69' c Con: Madigan (1/1); Pen: Madigan (2/3) 6', 28'

Thomond Park
Attendance: 25,600
Referee: Nigel Owens (WRU)

26 December 2014
18:45

Ulster (Ireland)	13–10	(Ireland) Connacht (1 BP)
Try: Gilroy 19' c Con: Jackson (1/1); Pen: Jackson (2/4) 14', 62'	Report	Try: Muldowney 66' c Con: Carty (1/1); Pen: Carty (1/1) 4'

Kingspan Stadium
Attendance: 17,107
Referee: John Lacey (IRFU)

27 December 2014
17:15

Ospreys (Wales)	17–15	(Wales) Scarlets (1 BP)
Try: Natoga 28' c Lydiate 32' c Con: Biggar (2/2); Pen: Biggar (1/2) 11'	Report	Pen: Priestland (1/1) 7'; S. Shingler (4/4) 19', 36', 56', 64'

Liberty Stadium
Attendance: 15,632
Referee: Marius Mitrea (FIR)

28 December 2014
15:00

Zebre (Italy)	16–26	(Italy) Benetton Treviso
Try: Venditti 4' c Con: Haimona (1/1); Pen: Haimona (3/5) 12', 17', 45'	Report	Try: Seniloli 29' c Minto 73' c Con: Hayward (2/2); Pen: Hayward (4/4) 9', 15', 40', 50'

Stadio XXV Aprile
Attendance: 4,530
Referee: Andrew McMenemy (SRU)

==== 1872 Cup 1st round ====
27 December 2014
14:40

Glasgow Warriors (Scotland)	16–6	(Scotland) Edinburgh
Try: Strauss 36' c Con: Weir (1/1); Pen: Weir (3/4) 15', 34', 69'	Report	Pen: Hidalgo-Clyne (1/1) 5'; Heathcote (1/1) 52'

Scotstoun Stadium
Attendance: 6,945
Referee: George Clancy (IRFU)

=== Round 12 ===
1 January 2015
14:05

(1 BP) Newport Gwent Dragons (Wales)	9–11	(Wales) Cardiff Blues
Pen: Prydie (3/4) 2', 47', 56'	Report	Try: Allen 15' m Pen: Anscombe (1/2) 68'; Drop: Anscombe (1/1) 41'

Rodney Parade
Attendance: 8,486
Referee: Ian Davies (WRU)

1 January 2015
17:00

Connacht (Ireland)	24–16	(Ireland) Munster
Try: Marmion 29' c Ronaldson 42' c Muldowney 60' c Con: Ronaldson (1/1); Leader (2/2); Pen: Nikora (1/1) 55'	Report	Try: P. O'Mahony 10' c Con: Keatley (1/1); Pen: Keatley (3/3) 7', 15', 38'

Galway Sportsgrounds
Attendance: 7,745
Referee: David Wilkinson (IRFU)

3 January 2015
15:00

Benetton Treviso (Italy)	17–15	(Italy) Zebre (1 BP)
Try: Campagnaro 22' c Gori 71' c Con: Hayward (2/2); Pen: Hayward (1/2) 13'	Report	Try: Geldenhuys 69' m Leonard 80' c Con: Haimona (1/2); Pen: Padovani (1/2) 11'

Stadio Comunale di Monigo
Attendance: 4,925
Referee: Gary Conway (IRFU)

3 January 2015
14:40

Leinster (Ireland)	24–11	(Ireland) Ulster
Try: Madigan 42' c Conan 79' m Con: Madigan (1/2); Pen: Madigan (4/4) 21', 31', 40', 60'	Report	Try: Herbst 49' m Pen: Pienaar (2/4) 16', 25'

RDS Arena
Attendance: 18,200
Referee: Marius Mitrea (FIR)

3 January 2015
17:05

Scarlets (Wales)	22–10	(Wales) Ospreys
Try: L. Williams 28' m Barclay 41' m Pen: Priestland (4/5) 2', 24', 38', 55'	Report	Try: D. Evans 66' c Con: Biggar (1/1); Pen: Biggar (1/1) 13'

Parc y Scarlets
Attendance: 12,301
Referee: John Lacey (IRFU)

==== 1872 Cup 2nd round ====
2 January 2015
19:35

Edinburgh (Scotland)	20–8	(Scotland) Glasgow Warriors
Try: Visser (2) 28' c, 32' c Con: Hidalgo-Clyne (2/2); Pen: Hidalgo-Clyne (2/4) 17', 25'	Report	Try: Matawalu 41' m Pen: Russell (1/1) 10'

Murrayfield Stadium
Attendance: 15,810
Referee: Nigel Owens (WRU)

=== Round 13 ===
9 January 2015
19:35

(1 BP) Connacht (Ireland)	13–16	(Scotland) Edinburgh
Try: Penalty try 37' c Con: Nikora (1/1); Pen: Nikora (2/3) 23', 40'	Report	Try: Denton 16' c Con: Hidalgo-Clyne (1/1); Pen: Hidalgo-Clyne (3/4) 44', 49', 70'

Galway Sportsgrounds
Attendance: 5,267
Referee: Leighton Hodges (WRU)

9 January 2015
19:35

Glasgow Warriors (Scotland)	22–7	(Wales) Scarlets
Try: Dunbar 26' m Murchie 43' c Van der Merwe 68' c Con: Russell (2/3); Pen: Russell (1/2) 65'	Report	Try: L. Williams 38' c Con: Priestland (1/1)

Scotstoun Stadium
Attendance: 5,320
Referee: George Clancy (IRFU)

10 January 2015
14:40

Cardiff Blues (Wales)	13–22	(Ireland) Leinster (1 BP)
Try: Vosawai 27' c Con: Anscombe (1/1); Pen: Anscombe (2/3) 17', 21'	Report	Try: Reid 1' m Gopperth 55' c L. McGrath 62' m Furlong 75' m Con: Gopperth (1/4)

Cardiff Arms Park
Attendance: 7,053
Referee: Neil Paterson (SRU)

10 January 2015
16:00

Zebre (Italy)	7–31	(Ireland) Munster (1 BP)
Try: Fabiani 57' c Con: Orquera (1/1)	Report	Try: Jones 13' c Stander 28' c Murray 32' c Zebo 42' c Con: Keatley (4/4); Pen: Keatley (1/1) 8'

Stadio XXV Aprile
Attendance: 2,615
Referee: Ian Davies (WRU)

11 January 2015
15:00

(1 BP) Benetton Treviso (Italy)	20–24	(Ireland) Ulster
Try: Christie 38' c Minto 56' c Con: Hayward (2/2); Pen: Hayward (2/2) 67', 72'	Report	Try: Jackson 6' c Pienaar 22' c Bowe 25' c Con: Jackson (3/3); Pen: Jackson (1/1) 19'

Stadio Comunale di Monigo
Attendance: 3,108
Referee: Ben Whitehouse (WRU)

11 January 2015
16:00

Ospreys (Wales)	22–11	(Wales) Newport Gwent Dragons
Try: Ardron 32' c Con: Biggar (1/1); Pen: Biggar (5/5) 13', 39', 43', 57', 79'	Report	Try: Rees 70' m Pen: Prydie (2/3) 4', 36'

Liberty Stadium
Attendance: 7,152
Referee: Dudley Phillips (IRFU)

=== Round 14 ===
13 February 2015
19:35

(1 BP) Ulster (Ireland)	43–3	(Italy) Benetton Treviso
Try: Allen 25' c Penalty try 60' c McCloskey 68' c Gilroy (2) 72' m, 77' c Warwick 75' c Con: Pienaar (5/6); Pen: Pienaar (1/2) 18'	Report	Pen: Carlisle (1/1) 66'

Kingspan Stadium
Attendance: 15,518
Referee: Ian Davies (WRU)

13 February 2015
20:05

Edinburgh (Scotland)	24–16	(Wales) Ospreys
Try: Te Rure 18' c Brown 62' c Hart 77' c Con: Te Rure (1/1); Heathcote (2/2); Pen: Te Rure (1/3) 40'	Report	Try: D. Evans 80' c Con: Davies (1/1); Pen: Davies (3/4) 15', 26', 35'

Myreside
Attendance: 2,891
Referee: Gary Conway (IRFU)

14 February 2015
19:35

Munster (Ireland)	33–16	(Wales) Cardiff Blues
Try: Hurley 47' c O'Donoghue 59' c R. O'Mahony 80' c Con: Hanrahan (3/3); Pen: Hanrahan (4/5) 10', 35', 38', 76'	Report	Try: Navidi 70' c Con: Patchell (1/1); Pen: Patchell (3/3) 13', 17', 30'

Irish Independent Park
Attendance: 6,991
Referee: Lloyd Linton (SRU)

15 February 2015
12:45

(1 BP) Scarlets (Wales)	32–14	(Ireland) Connacht
Try: Tagicakibau 23' m Robinson 27' c J. Williams 33' c J. Davies 50' c Con: S. Shingler (3/4); Pen: S. Shingler (2/2) 13', 17'	Report	Try: Adeolokun 72' m Pen: Carty (3/3) 4', 39', 47'

Parc y Scarlets
Attendance: 5,000
Referee: Marius Mitrea (FIR)

15 February 2015
14:00

Zebre (Italy)	10–54	(Scotland) Glasgow Warriors (1 BP)
Try: Cristiano 16' c Con: Orquera (1/1); Pen: Orquera (1/1) 7'	Report	Try: Horne (2) 2' c, 36' m Van der Merwe 14' c Murchie (2) 18' c, 75' c Swinson 40' c Lyle 64' c Bordill 78' c Con: Horne (5/6); Braid (2/2)

Stadio Sergio Lanfranchi
Attendance: 900
Referee: Leo Colgan (IRFU)

15 February 2015
15:00

(1 BP) Leinster (Ireland)	14–16	(Wales) Newport Gwent Dragons
Try: D. Kearney 66' m Pen: Gopperth (3/3) 16', 30', 53'	Report	Try: Leach 10' c Con: Prydie (1/1); Pen: Prydie (3/3) 38', 62', 69'

RDS Arena
Attendance: 15,020
Referee: Ben Whitehouse (WRU)

=== Round 15 ===
20 February 2015
20:05

(1 BP) Benetton Treviso (Italy)	40–24	(Wales) Cardiff Blues
Try: Luamanu 4' m Esposito 12' c Bacchin 28' c Hayward 36' m Seniloli 41' c Con: Hayward (3/5); Pen: Hayward (3/3) 10', 46', 77'	Report	Try: L. Williams 17' c Navidi 31' c A. Thomas 48' c Con: Patchell (3/3); Pen: Patchell (1/1) 14'

Stadio Comunale di Monigo
Attendance: 2,670
Referee: Gary Conway (IRFU)

20 February 2015
19:35

(1 BP) Edinburgh (Scotland)	17–20	(Ireland) Ulster
Try: Burleigh 8' m Pen: Heathcote (4/9) 18', 29', 36', 64'	Report	Try: Pienaar 13' c Cave 51' c Con: Pienaar (2/2); Pen: Pienaar (2/2) 34', 48'

Murrayfield Stadium
Attendance: 4,797
Referee: Leighton Hodges (WRU)

20 February 2015
19:35

(1 BP) Leinster (Ireland)	29–8	(Italy) Zebre
Try: Ryan 46' c Gopperth 56' c Fitzgerald 73' m Cronin 80' c Con: Gopperth (3/4); Pen: Gopperth (1/2) 32'	Report	Try: Daniller 21' m Pen: Mi. Bergamasco (1/1) 36'

RDS Arena
Attendance: 14,197
Referee: Nigel Owens (WRU)

21 February 2015
14:40

Scarlets (Wales)	25–25	(Ireland) Munster
Try: Parkes 60' c Con: S. Shingler (1/1); Pen: S. Shingler (6/6) 3', 14', 23', 27', 59', 68'	Report	Try: O'Donoghue 53' c Jones 75' m Hanrahan 80' c Con: Keatley (2/3); Pen: Keatley (2/3) 10', 20'

Parc y Scarlets
Attendance: 6,059
Referee: Dudley Phillips (IRFU)

21 February 2015
17:15

Glasgow Warriors (Scotland)	19–16	(Wales) Ospreys (1 BP)
Try: MacArthur 13' c Con: Horne (1/1); Pen: Horne (4/5) 36', 50', 67', 74'	Report	Try: Grabham 52' c Con: Davies (1/1); Pen: Davies (3/6) 26', 33', 57'

Scotstoun Stadium
Attendance: 6,167
Referee: George Clancy (IRFU)

22 February 2015
16:00

(1 BP) Newport Gwent Dragons (Wales)	25–30	(Ireland) Connacht
Try: Amos (2) 32' m, 80' c Dixon 65' c Con: Prydie (2/3); Pen: Prydie (2/2) 4', 39'	Report	Try: Ronaldson 7' c Masterson 22' c Kearney 75' c Con: Carty (2/2); Leader (1/1); Pen: Carty (1/3) 11'; Leader (2/2) 57', 60'

Rodney Parade
Attendance: 4,180
Referee: Lloyd Linton (SRU)

=== Round 16 ===
27 February 2015
19:35

Ospreys (Wales)	9–9	(Ireland) Leinster
Pen: Davies (2/2) 40', 54'; Drop: Davies (1/1) 42'	Report	Pen: Gopperth (3/3) 14', 22', 78'

Liberty Stadium
Attendance: 7,557
Referee: John Lacey (IRFU)

27 February 2015
19:35

Ulster (Ireland)	25–20	(Wales) Scarlets (1 BP)
Try: Gilroy 45' m L. Marshall 51' c Pienaar 58' c Con: Pienaar (2/3); Pen: Pienaar (2/3) 24', 31'	Report	Try: Barclay 37' c K. Phillips 78' c Con: S. Shingler (2/2); Pen: S. Shingler (2/4) 12', 28'

Kingspan Stadium
Attendance: 17,138
Referee: Ben Whitehouse (WRU)

28 February 2015
19:15

(1 BP) Munster (Ireland)	22–10	(Scotland) Glasgow Warriors
Try: O'Donoghue 28' m Guiñazú 37' c Earls 61' m Stander 66' m Con: Keatley (1/4)	Report	Try: de Klerk 59' c Con: Braid (1/1); Pen: Braid (1/2) 52'

Irish Independent Park
Attendance: 7,361
Referee: Nigel Owens (WRU)

1 March 2015
12:45

Cardiff Blues (Wales)	21–15	(Scotland) Edinburgh (1 BP)
Try: L. Williams 17' c E. Jenkins 39' c Patchell 63' c Con: Patchell (3/3)	Report	Try: Visser 54' c Grant 69' m Con: Heathcote (1/1); Pen: Heathcote (1/1) 44'

Cardiff Arms Park
Attendance: 5,740
Referee: Dudley Phillips (IRFU)

1 March 2015
18:00

Zebre (Italy)	23–17	(Wales) Newport Gwent Dragons (1 BP)
Try: J. Sarto 28' c Pratichetti 46' c Con: Mi. Bergamasco (2/2); Pen: Mi. Bergamasco (3/4) 7', 40', 79'	Report	Try: T. Thomas 18' m Dixon 21' m Cudd 42' c Con: Prydie (1/3)

Stadio Sergio Lanfranchi
Attendance: 2,483
Referee: Gary Conway (IRFU)

1 March 2015
17:15

(1 BP) Connacht (Ireland)	53–5	(Italy) Benetton Treviso
Try: O'Halloran 5' c Heenan 45' c Healy (2) 51' c, 72' c Buckley 54' c Muldowney 67' m Poolman 79' c Con: Ronaldson (6/7); Pen: Ronaldson (2/2) 14', 31'	Report	Try: Christie 34' m

Galway Sportsgrounds
Attendance: 3,880
Referee: Andrew McMenemy (SRU)

=== Round 17 ===
6 March 2015
19:35

Cardiff Blues (Wales)	18–17	(Ireland) Connacht (1 BP)
Try: Tuculet (2) 56' m, 80' c Con: Patchell (1/2); Pen: Patchell (2/2) 24', 64'	Report	Try: Heenan 5' c Muldowney 70' c Con: Ronaldson (2/2); Pen: Ronaldson (1/1) 22'

Cardiff Arms Park
Attendance: 5,624
Referee: Lloyd Linton (SRU)

6 March 2015
19:35

(1 BP) Glasgow Warriors (Scotland)	26–5	(Italy) Zebre
Try: Van der Merwe (2) 3' c, 36' m Fusaro 20' c K. Bryce 27' c Con: Horne (2/2); Braid (1/2)	Report	Try: Berryman 58' m

Scotstoun Stadium
Attendance: 5,528
Referee: Ian Davies (WRU)

7 March 2015
14:40

Ospreys (Wales)	26–12	(Ireland) Munster
Try: Baker 31' m Pen: Davies (6/6) 4', 22', 37', 60', 74', 79'; Drop: Davies (1/2) 39'	Report	Try: D. Ryan 71' m Earls 76' c Con: Keatley (1/2)

Liberty Stadium
Attendance: 8,632
Referee: Marius Mitrea (FIR)

7 March 2015
17:15

Scarlets (Wales)	23–13	(Ireland) Leinster
Try: Barclay 28' m J. Williams 51' c Pitman 65' m Con: S. Shingler (1/3); Pen: S. Shingler (1/1) 9'; Priestland (1/1) 75'	Report	Try: Te'o 18' c Con: Gopperth (1/1); Pen: Gopperth (2/2) 25', 57'

Parc y Scarlets
Attendance: 6,069
Referee: George Clancy (IRFU)

7 March 2015
19:00

Benetton Treviso (Italy)	8–29	(Scotland) Edinburgh (1 BP)
Try: Ragusi 69' m Pen: Hayward (1/2) 33'	Report	Try: Watson 17' c Scott (2) 19' c, 73' c Strauss 59' m Con: Hidalgo-Clyne (3/4); Pen: Hidalgo-Clyne (1/1) 35'

Stadio Comunale di Monigo
Attendance: 3,018
Referee: Nigel Owens (WRU)

8 March 2015
16:00

Newport Gwent Dragons (Wales)	26–22	(Ireland) Ulster (1 BP)
Try: Buckley 54' m J. Evans 61' c Meyer 73' c Con: D. Jones (1/3); Pen: Prydie (2/4) 13', 26'; D. Jones (1/1) 50'	Report	Try: Gilroy (2) 21' m, 69' c Adair 79' c Con: Pienaar (2/3); Pen: Pienaar (1/2) 47'

Rodney Parade
Attendance: 6,019
Referee: Dudley Phillips (IRFU)

=== Round 18 ===
27 March 2015
19:35

(1 BP) Leinster (Ireland)	34–34	(Scotland) Glasgow Warriors (1 BP)
Try: McFadden 24' c Boss (2) 41' c, 54' c Murphy 51' c Con: Madigan (4/4); Pen: Madigan (2/2) 46', 70'	Report	Try: Hogg 7' c Vernon 30' c Bennett 34' c G. Bryce 73' c Con: Horne (4/4); Pen: Horne (1/1) 11'; Bennett (1/1) 40'

RDS Arena
Attendance: 16,210
Referee: Nigel Owens (WRU)

27 March 2015
19:35

(1 BP) Ulster (Ireland)	36–17	(Wales) Cardiff Blues
Try: Gilroy 2' c Ludik (2) 17' m, 72' m P. Marshall 76' c Con: Pienaar (1/2); Humphreys (1/2); Pen: Pienaar (4/4) 14', 30', 41', 65'	Report	Try: Isaacs 52' c Cuthbert 61' c Con: Anscombe (2/2); Pen: Anscombe (1/1) 45'

Kingspan Stadium
Attendance: 16,413
Referee: Marius Mitrea (FIR)

28 March 2015
14:40

Scarlets (Wales)	15–26	(Scotland) Edinburgh
Pen: S. Shingler (5/5) 1', 11', 18', 22', 25'	Report	Try: Burleigh 8' c Denton 38' c Con: Hidalgo-Clyne (2/2); Pen: Hidalgo-Clyne (4/4) 33', 60', 73', 78'

Parc y Scarlets
Attendance: 7,310
Referee: John Lacey (IRFU)

28 March 2015
17:15

(1 BP) Munster (Ireland)	42–20	(Ireland) Connacht
Try: B. Holland 12' c Casey 55' c Zebo 63' c Smith 72' c Hurley 74' c Earls 79' c Con: Keatley (3/3); Hanrahan (3/3)	Report	Try: Nikora 68' c O'Leary 78' c Con: Nikora (2/2); Pen: Carty (2/3) 1', 45'

Thomond Park
Attendance: 18,762
Referee: Leighton Hodges (WRU)

28 March 2015
19:15

(1 BP) Ospreys (Wales)	53–22	(Italy) Zebre
Try: Baker (2) 2' c, 51' c Matavesi 7' c Baldwin 35' c Webb 63' c Penalty try 71' c Dirksen 74' m Con: Davies (5/5); Biggar (1/2); Pen: Davies (2/3) 16', 22'	Report	Try: Berryman 40' m Toniolatti 68' c Chillon 78' c Con: Mi. Bergamasco (2/2); Pen: Garcia (1/1) 10'

Liberty Stadium
Attendance: 6,545
Referee: George Clancy (IRFU)

28 March 2015
20:30

Benetton Treviso (Italy)	17–32	(Wales) Newport Gwent Dragons (1 BP)
Try: Bacchin 46' c Penalty try 55' c Con: Hayward (2/2); Pen: Hayward (1/1) 66'	Report	Try: J. Evans 18' c Amos 40' c Prydie (2) 71' m, 78' c Con: Prydie (3/4); Pen: Prydie (2/3) 32', 43'

Stadio Comunale di Monigo
Attendance: 3,413
Referee: Ian Davies (WRU)

=== Round 19 ===
10 April 2015
19:35

(1 BP) Glasgow Warriors (Scotland)	36–17	(Wales) Cardiff Blues
Try: Hall 24' c Horne (3) 27' m, 31' c, 40' c Ashe 44' c Con: Horne (3/4); Russell (1/1); Pen: Horne (1/2) 4'	Report	Try: G. Davies 60' c Fish 67' c Con: Anscombe (2/2); Pen: Anscombe (1/1) 14'

Scotstoun Stadium
Attendance: 7,240
Referee: George Clancy (IRFU)

10 April 2015
20:35

Benetton Treviso (Italy)	13–33	(Wales) Ospreys (1 BP)
Try: Ragusi 49' c Con: Hayward (1/1); Pen: Hayward (2/2) 20', 54'	Report	Try: Walker 39' m D. Evans 64' m Tipuric 77' c Webb 79' c Con: Biggar (2/4); Pen: Biggar (3/4) 2', 26', 71'

Stadio Comunale di Monigo
Attendance: 3,182
Referee: Dudley Phillips (IRFU)

11 April 2015
14:40

(1 BP) Connacht (Ireland)	20–27	(Ireland) Ulster (1 BP)
Try: Healy 44' c O'Halloran 70' c Con: Nikora (1/1); Carty (1/1); Pen: Nikora (1/1) 51'; Carty (1/1) 62'	Report	Try: Ludik 4' m Bowe (2) 31' m, 56' m Gilroy 34' c Best 64' m Con: Pienaar (1/5)

Galway Sportsgrounds
Attendance: 5,921
Referee: Nigel Owens (WRU)

11 April 2015
16:00

(1 BP) Zebre (Italy)	26–28	(Wales) Scarlets
Try: Biagi 38' c Geldenhuys 67' c Con: Orquera (1/1); Garcia (1/1); Pen: Orquera (3/4) 5', 20', 50'; Garcia (1/3) 77'	Report	Try: S. Williams (2) 10' c, 44' c J. Davies 74' m Con: S. Shingler (1/1); Priestland (1/2); Pen: S. Shingler (2/3) 8', 37'; Priestland (1/3) 80'

Stadio Sergio Lanfranchi
Attendance: 2,539
Referee: Gary Conway (IRFU)

11 April 2015
19:30

Edinburgh (Scotland)	3–34	(Ireland) Munster (1 BP)
Pen: Heathcote (1/1) 3'	Report	Try: Casey 32' c Stander 52' m Murray 56' c Zebo 62' m Earls 64' c Con: Keatley (3/5); Pen: Keatley (1/1) 19'

Murrayfield Stadium
Attendance: 4,818
Referee: Ian Davies (WRU)

12 April 2015
16:15

(1 BP) Newport Gwent Dragons (Wales)	25–22	(Ireland) Leinster (1 BP)
Try: T. Thomas 10' m Dixon 58' c Benjamin (2) 68' m, 72' m Con: Tovey (1/4); Pen: Tovey (1/1) 3'	Report	Try: Te'o (2) 37' m, 49' c Gopperth 40' c Con: Gopperth (2/3); Pen: Gopperth (1/1) 18'

Rodney Parade
Attendance: 5,088
Referee: Marius Mitrea (FIR)

=== Round 20 ===
24 April 2015
19:35

(1 BP) Edinburgh (Scotland)	37–0	(Italy) Zebre
Try: Grant (2) 7' c, 54' c Fife 25' c Ford 50' m McInally 79' m Con: Hidalgo-Clyne (3/4); Pen: Hidalgo-Clyne (2/2) 19', 31'	Report

Murrayfield Stadium
Attendance: 3,490
Referee: Leighton Hodges (WRU)

24 April 2015
19:35

Ulster (Ireland)	26–10	(Ireland) Leinster
Try: Henderson 12' c Gilroy 72' c Con: Pienaar (2/2); Pen: Pienaar (4/6) 16', 38', 64', 66'	Report	Try: Te'o 6' c Con: Gopperth (1/1); Pen: Gopperth (1/1) 4'

Kingspan Stadium
Attendance: 17,097
Referee: John Lacey (IRFU)

25 April 2015
13:05

Connacht (Ireland)	13–31	(Scotland) Glasgow Warriors (1 BP)
Try: Muldowney 53' c Con: Carty (1/1); Pen: Carty (2/5) 6', 16'	Report	Try: Matawalu (2) 24' m, 38' c Hogg 35' c Ashe 67' c Seymour 73' m Con: Russell (3/5)

Galway Sportsgrounds
Attendance: 4,430
Referee: Marius Mitrea (FIR)

25 April 2015
15:05

(1 BP) Munster (Ireland)	30–19	(Italy) Benetton Treviso
Try: Zebo 9' m Stander 18' m O'Donnell 39' c Penalty try 67' c Con: Keatley (2/4); Pen: Keatley (2/2) 4', 52'	Report	Try: Luamanu 24' c Pratichetti 42' c Ragusi 74' m Con: Hayward (2/3)

Irish Independent Park
Attendance: 7,644
Referee: Ben Whitehouse (WRU)

==== Judgement Day ====
25 April 2015
14:30

Cardiff Blues (Wales)	23–31	(Wales) Ospreys (1 BP)
Try: Navidi 58' c Fish 80' c Con: G. Davies (1/1); Anscombe (1/1); Pen: Anscombe (3/3) 7', 11', 27'	Report	Try: D. Evans 34' c Biggar 44' c Grabham 52' c John 65' c Con: Biggar (4/4); Pen: Biggar (1/2) 61'

Millennium Stadium
Attendance: 52,762
Referee: Nigel Owens (WRU)

25 April 2015
16:45

Newport Gwent Dragons (Wales)	10–29	(Wales) Scarlets (1 BP)
Try: Morgan 16' c Con: D. Jones (1/1); Pen: D. Jones (1/2) 24'	Report	Try: Owens 37' c S. Williams 39' c L. Williams 41' c Robinson 57' m Con: Priestland (3/4); Pen: Priestland (1/1) 6'

Millennium Stadium
Attendance: 52,762
Referee: George Clancy (IRFU)

Notes:

- The 52,762 crowd for the 2 matches, was a Judgment Day and Pro 12 match record.

=== Round 21 ===
8 May 2015
19:30

Newport Gwent Dragons (Wales)	19–5	(Scotland) Edinburgh
Try: Gustafson 49' c Con: Tovey (1/1); Pen: Tovey (3/4) 4', 37', 78'; Prydie (1/1) 40'	Report	Try: McInally 76' m

Rodney Parade
Attendance: 5,608
Referee: Gary Conway (IRFU)

8 May 2015
19:35

Leinster (Ireland)	10–0	(Italy) Benetton Treviso
Try: Heaslip 8' c Con: Madigan (1/1); Pen: Gopperth (1/1) 77'	Report

RDS Arena
Attendance: 11,322
Referee: Leighton Hodges (WRU)

8 May 2015
19:35

Ospreys (Wales)	21–10	(Scotland) Glasgow Warriors
Try: John 46' m Webb 58' c Con: Biggar (1/2); Pen: D. Evans (1/1) 19'; Biggar (2/2) 42', 74'	Report	Try: Fusaro 62' c Con: Weir (1/1); Pen: Weir (1/3) 14'

Liberty Stadium
Attendance: 10,981
Referee: George Clancy (IRFU)

9 May 2015
14:40

Ulster (Ireland)	23–23	(Ireland) Munster
Try: Bowe 40' c P. Marshall 80' c Con: Jackson (2/2); Pen: Jackson (3/3) 39', 44', 70'	Report	Try: Earls 76' m Pen: Keatley (6/6) 4', 31', 36', 54', 60', 68'

Kingspan Stadium
Attendance: 17,139
Referee: Nigel Owens (WRU)

9 May 2015
18:30

Zebre (Italy)	10–40	(Ireland) Connacht (1 BP)
Try: Leonard 26' c Con: Orquera (1/1); Pen: Orquera (1/1) 34'	Report	Try: Jo. Cooney (2) 11' c, 35' c Healy 29' c Masterson 54' m O'Halloran 70' c O'Leary 73' c Con: Carty (3/4); C. McKeon (2/2)

Stadio Sergio Lanfranchi
Attendance: 2,680
Referee: Ian Davies (WRU)

10 May 2015
16:00

Scarlets (Wales)	16–6	(Wales) Cardiff Blues
Try: Owens 65' c Con: Priestland (1/1); Pen: Priestland (3/3) 25', 31', 39'	Report	Pen: Patchell (2/3) 19', 42'

Parc y Scarlets
Attendance: 10,195
Referee: John Lacey (IRFU)

=== Round 22 ===
16 May 2015
16:00

(1 BP) Benetton Treviso (Italy)	13–17	(Wales) Scarlets
Try: Giazzon 13' m Hayward 28' m Pen: Hayward (1/1) 20'	Report	Try: L. Williams 61' c S. Evans 69' c Con: Priestland (2/2); Pen: Priestland (1/1) 26'

Stadio Comunale di Monigo
Attendance: 3,895
Referee: George Clancy (IRFU)

16 May 2015
15:00

(1 BP) Cardiff Blues (Wales)	29–5	(Italy) Zebre
Try: Cuthbert (2) 29' m, 49' m G. Jenkins 35' c Patchell 57' c G. Smith 80' m Con: Patchell (2/4)	Report	Try: Bernabò 68' m

Cardiff Arms Park
Attendance: 6,487
Referee: Gary Conway (IRFU)

16 May 2015
15:00

(1 BP) Connacht (Ireland)	20–24	(Wales) Ospreys
Try: Masterson 53' c Buckley 80' c Con: Carty (2/2); Pen: Carty (2/2) 41', 49'	Report	Try: Biggar 15' c John 25' c Webb 27' c Con: Biggar (3/3); Pen: Biggar (1/1) 5'

Galway Sportsgrounds
Attendance: 5,226
Referee: Marius Mitrea (FIR)

16 May 2015
15:00

Edinburgh (Scotland)	23–36	(Ireland) Leinster (1 BP)
Try: Watson 27' c Visser 55' c Con: Hidalgo-Clyne (2/2); Pen: Hidalgo-Clyne (3/4) 7', 44', 65'	Report	Try: Reid 17' c Conan 31' c Kirchner 51' m Murphy 71' c L. McGrath 77' c Con: Madigan (4/5); Drop: Madigan (1/1) 15'

Murrayfield Stadium
Attendance: 4,643
Referee: Nigel Owens (WRU)

16 May 2015
15:00

(1 BP) Glasgow Warriors (Scotland)	32–10	(Ireland) Ulster
Try: Hogg 54' m Russell (2) 59' c, 69' c Vernon 72' c Con: Russell (3/4); Pen: Russell (2/2) 5', 34'	Report	Try: Henry 28' c Con: Humphreys (1/1) 29'; Pen: Humphreys (1/1) 36'

Scotstoun Stadium
Attendance: 10,000
Referee: Ian Davies (WRU)

16 May 2015
15:00

(1 BP) Munster (Ireland)	50–27	(Wales) Newport Gwent Dragons (1 BP)
Try: Smith 3' c Stander 8' c Murray (3) 16' c, 23' c, 64' m O'Connell 40' m Earls 41' c R. O'Mahony 78' m Con: Keatley (5/6)	Report	Try: Hewitt 4' c Morgan 50' c Buckley 74' m Dixon 80' m Con: Tovey (2/2); Pen: Tovey (1/1) 2'

Irish Independent Park
Attendance: 8,200
Referee: Ben Whitehouse (WRU)

== Play-offs ==
=== Semi-finals ===
22 May 2015
19:45

Glasgow Warriors (Scotland)	16–14	(Ireland) Ulster
Try: Van der Merwe 75' c Con: Russell (1/1); Pen: Russell (2/2) 5', 60'; Hogg (1/2) 13'	Report	Try: Henry 18' m Pen: Pienaar (3/3) 1', 55', 66'

Scotstoun Stadium
Attendance: 10,000
Referee: George Clancy (IRFU)

23 May 2015
14:30

Munster (Ireland)	21–18	(Wales) Ospreys
Try: Zebo 39' m Hurley 42' m Butler 49' m Pen: Keatley (2/4) 16', 22'	Report	Try: Webb 46' m Hassler 52' c Con: Biggar (1/2); Pen: Biggar (2/2) 13', 66'

Thomond Park
Attendance: 16,158
Referee: Nigel Owens (WRU)

=== Final ===
30 May 2015
18:30

Munster (Ireland)	13–31	(Scotland) Glasgow Warriors
Try: Smith 37' c Con: Keatley (1/1); Pen: Keatley (2/3) 23', 48'	Report	Try: Harley 8' c Van der Merwe 25' c Pyrgos 31' c Russell 58' c Con: Russell (4/4); Pen: Weir (1/1) 73'

Kingspan Stadium
Attendance: 17,057
Referee: Nigel Owens (WRU)

== Leading scorers ==
Note: Flags to the left of player names indicate national team as has been defined under World Rugby eligibility rules, or primary nationality for players who have not yet earned international senior caps. Players may hold one or more non-WR nationalities.

=== Top points scorers ===
Rank	Player	Club	Points
1	(Ireland) Ian Keatley	(Ireland) Munster	184
2	(Wales) Dan Biggar	(Wales) Ospreys	176
3	(Ireland) Ian Madigan	(Ireland) Leinster	140
4	(Wales) Rhys Patchell	(Wales) Cardiff Blues	132
5	(Wales) Sam Davies	(Wales) Ospreys	130

=== Top try scorers ===
Rank	Player	Club	Tries
1	(Wales) Rhys Webb	(Wales) Ospreys	12
2	(Ireland) Craig Gilroy	(Ireland) Ulster	11
3	(South Africa) CJ Stander	(Ireland) Munster	9
3	(Ireland) Simon Zebo	(Ireland) Munster	9
5	(Canada) D. T. H. van der Merwe	(Scotland) Glasgow Warriors	8

== End-of-season awards ==
PRO12 Awards 2014/15 awards:

Award	Winner
Players' Player of the Season:	(Wales) Rhys Webb (Ospreys)
Young Player of the Season:	(Scotland) Sam Hidalgo-Clyne (Edinburgh)
Coach of the Season:	(Scotland) Gregor Townsend (Glasgow)
Chairman's Award:	(Scotland) Alastair Kellock (Glasgow)
Golden Boot:	(Ireland) Ian Madigan (Leinster)
Collision Kings:	(Scotland) Glasgow Warriors
Fairplay Award:	(Ireland) Connacht
Try of the Season:	(Ireland) Craig Gilroy (Ulster vs Scarlets)

2014/2015 Dream Team

Pos		Player	Team
FB	15	(Wales) Liam Williams	(Wales) Scarlets
RW	14	(Scotland) Tommy Seymour	(Scotland) Glasgow
OC	13	(Ireland) Robbie Henshaw	(Ireland) Connacht
IC	12	(Scotland) Peter Horne	(Scotland) Glasgow
LW	11	(Ireland) Craig Gilroy	(Ireland) Ulster
FH	10	(Wales) Dan Biggar	(Wales) Ospreys
SH	9	(Wales) Rhys Webb	(Wales) Ospreys
N8	8	(South Africa) Josh Strauss	(Scotland) Glasgow
OF	7	(Ireland) Tommy O'Donnell	(Ireland) Munster
BF	6	(South Africa) CJ Stander	(Ireland) Munster
RL	5	(South Africa) Franco van der Merwe	(Ireland) Ulster
LL	4	(Wales) Alun Wyn Jones (c)	(Wales) Ospreys
TP	3	(South Africa) WP Nel	(Scotland) Edinburgh
HK	2	(Ireland) Rory Best	(Ireland) Ulster
LP	1	(Ireland) Denis Buckley	(Ireland) Connacht
