= Shane Buckley =

Irish rugby union player (born 1992)

- Born: 14 April 1992 (age 34) Cork, Ireland
- Height: 1.91 m (6 ft 3 in)
- Weight: 108 kg (17.0 st; 238 lb)
- School: Rockwell College

Rugby union career
- Position(s): Flanker, Number 8
Amateur team(s)
Years	Team	Apps	(Points)
- Garryowen
Senior career
Years	Team	Apps	(Points)
2014–2016	Munster	8	(0)
2016–present	Nottingham	65	(48)
2019–	Ealing	10	(0)
- Correct as of 29 August 2020
International career
Years	Team	Apps	(Points)
2010–2012	Ireland U20	12	(5)
- Correct as of 11 February 2015

Shane Buckley (born 14 April 1992) is an Irish rugby union player for English RFU Championship side Ealing Trailfinders. He plays primarily as a number 8.

== Professional career ==
=== Munster ===
Buckley made his Munster A debut on 17 December 2011, coming on as a replacement against Moseley in the British and Irish Cup. In March 2014, Buckley signed a development contract with the senior Munster squad for the 2014–15 season. Buckley was nominated for the John McCarthy Award for Munster Academy Player of the Year on 1 May 2014, an award Buckley won on 8 May 2014.

He made his debut for Munster on 5 September 2014, starting at Number 8 in the 14-13 opening 2014–15 Pro12 defeat against Edinburgh. Buckley signed a one-year contract extension with Munster in January 2015. In May 2016, it was announced that Buckley would leave Munster at the end of the 2015-16 season.

=== Nottingham ===
Buckley joined English RFU Championship side Nottingham ahead of the 2016–17 season, and later extended his contract with the club. Buckley was also invited to play for Wasps during their opening fixture of the 2018–19 Premiership Rugby Cup in October 2018.

=== Ealing Trailfinders ===
Buckley joined another RFU Championship club, Ealing Trailfinders, ahead of the 2019–20 season.
