= Martin Kelly (rugby union) =

- Born: 5 December 1989 (age 36) Kilkenny, Ireland
- Height: 1.88 m (6 ft 2 in)
- Weight: 128 kg (20.2 st; 282 lb)

Rugby union career
- Position: Prop
Amateur team(s)
Years	Team	Apps	(Points)
- Dublin University
Senior career
Years	Team	Apps	(Points)
2013–2014	Leinster A	3	(0)
2014–2015	Munster	0	(0)
- Correct as of 4 May 2014

Martin Kelly (born 5 December 1989) is an Irish former rugby union player. He played as a prop and represented Dublin University in the All-Ireland League before joining Munster.

== Munster ==
Kelly joined Munster from Dublin University at the beginning of the 2014–15 season. In June 2015, it was announced that Kelly would be leaving Munster.
