= Jerry Yanuyanutawa =

Fijian rugby union player (born 1985)

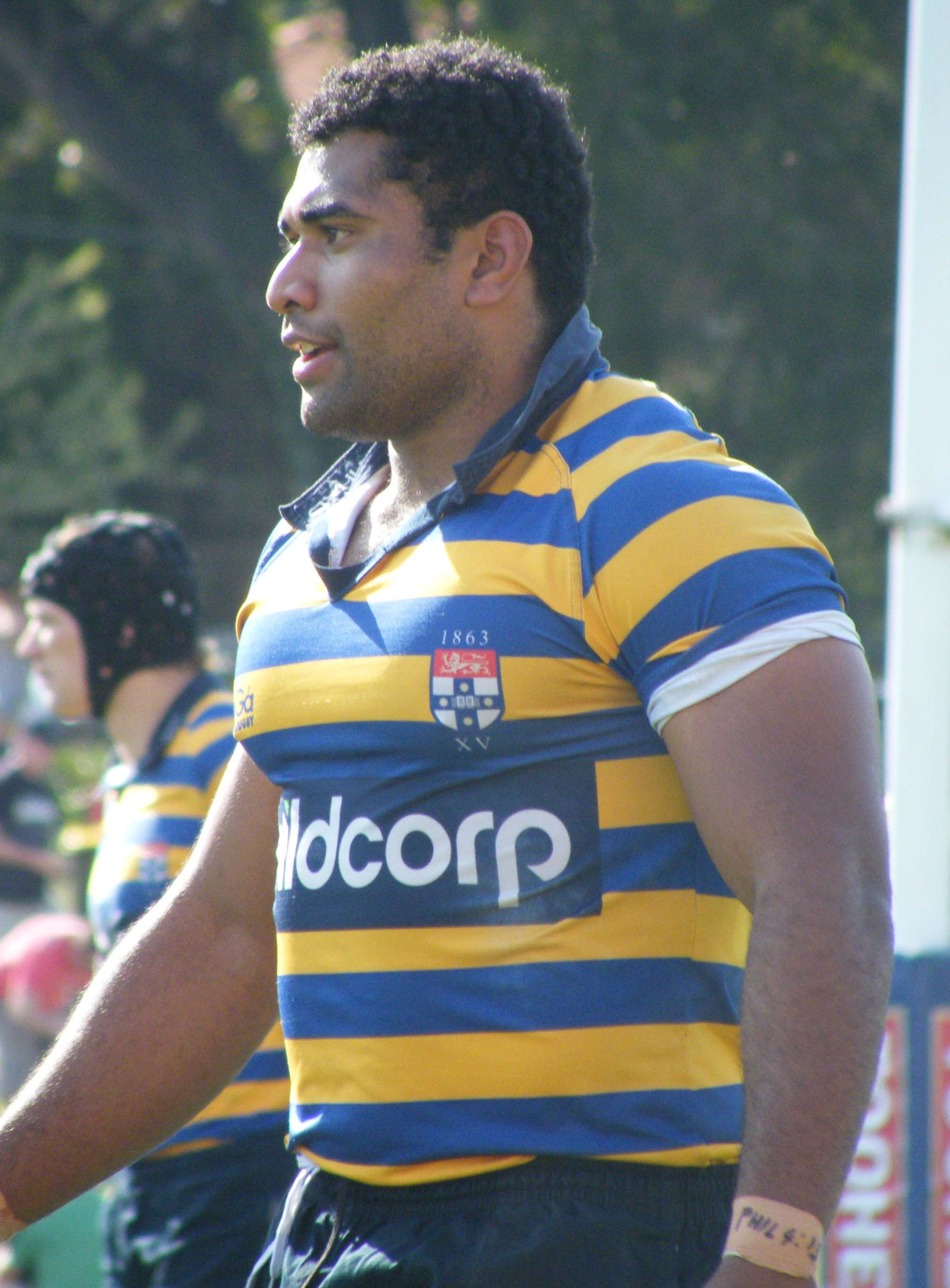
- Yanuyanutawa at Sydney University, 2008
- Born: Jerry Neil Berland N. Yanuyanutawa; 10 April 1985 (age 41) Suva, Fiji
- Height: 1.84 m (6 ft 0 in)
- Weight: 114 kg (17 st 13 lb)
- School: Suva Grammar School

Rugby union career
- Position: Prop
Amateur team(s)
Years	Team	Apps	(Points)
2005–11	Sydney University		
–	Ayr		
–	Glasgow Hawks		
Senior career
Years	Team	Apps	(Points)
2012–13	London Irish	25	(0)
2013–16	Glasgow Warriors	50	(10)
Super Rugby
Years	Team	Apps	(Points)
2009–12	Brumbies	9	(0)
International career
Years	Team	Apps	(Points)
2004	Fiji U21		
2012–	Fiji	20	(0)

Jerry Yanuyanutawa (born 10 April 1985 in Suva, Fiji) is a Fijian former international rugby union player who played at Prop. He formerly played for Glasgow Warriors.

== Rugby Union career ==
=== Amateur career ===
Yanuyanutawa began his rugby union career playing for Sydney University RFC. Where he was part of 3 premiership wins during Sydney University's 7 year rein as Shute Shield champions. He signed with the Brumbies on academy contract in 2008 with his front row partner Wallaby Nathan Charles.

While at Glasgow Warriors he occasionally played for Ayr and Glasgow Hawks.

=== Professional career ===
Yanuyanutawa made his debut for the Brumbies in the 2010 Super 14 season.

He joined London Irish in August 2012. and was capped 25 times with the exiles

In July 2013, he signed for Scottish side Glasgow Warriors joining fellow flying Fijian, Nikola Matawalu He was part of the Warriors side that won the 2015 Pro12 Grand Final. He left the club at the end of the 2015–16 season to go to Australia.

=== International career ===
He grew up in Fiji, where he represented their Under 21 side. He was later capped by the senior side.

== Teaching ==
Yanuyanutawa is now a teacher in Canberra, Australia.
