= BJ Botha =

South African rugby union player

- Born: Brendon James Botha; 4 January 1980 (age 46) Durban, South Africa
- Height: 1.81 m (5 ft 11 1/2 in)
- Weight: 112 kg (17.6 st; 247 lb)
- School: Durban High School, Durban; Kloof High School, Durban

Rugby union career
- Position: Prop
Provincial / State sides
Years	Team	Apps	(Points)
2008–2011	Ulster	58	(10)
2011–2016	Munster	111	(20)
2016–2017	Lyon	17	(0)
2017–2018	Biarritz	15	(5)
- Correct as of 11 January 2018
Super Rugby
Years	Team	Apps	(Points)
2001–2008	Sharks	32	(10)
International career
Years	Team	Apps	(Points)
2006–2010	South Africa	25	(5)
- Correct as of 30 June 2011

Brendon James Botha, better known as BJ Botha (born 4 January 1980) is a South African former rugby union player. He played as a prop. He is now a housemaster and rugby coach at CBC Monkstown.

== Professional career ==
=== Sharks ===
Botha played in the Currie Cup and Super 14 the Sharks. He played in all 13 Super 14 matches in 2006 and was one cap shy of a half-century in the domestic Currie Cup.

=== Ulster ===
He signed for Ulster on Thursday 14 August 2008 on a three-year deal, and left the province in May 2011.

=== Munster ===
Botha signed for the Irish province Munster on a two-year contract in February 2011, starting in the 2011–12 season.

He made his Munster debut against Scarlets on 17 September 2011. His first Heineken Cup game for Munster was against Northampton Saints in November 2011. He scored his first try for Munster in January 2012, in the Heineken Cup round 6 game against Northampton.

Botha scored a match-winning try for Munster in their final Pro12 game against Zebre on 3 May 2013. He signed a two-year contract extension with Munster in May 2013. Botha signed a six-month contract extension with Munster in March 2015, meaning he will stay with the province until at least December 2015. He won his 100th cap for Munster in the 2015 Pro12 Grand Final on 30 May 2015. In November 2015, it was announced that Botha's contract with Munster had been extended to June 2016. Botha started Munster's opening pool game of the 2015–16 European Rugby Champions Cup against Treviso on 14 November 2015, scoring a try in his team's 32–7 win. On 9 January 2016, Botha ruptured his anterior cruciate ligament during Munster's match against Stade Français. The injury ruled him out for the foreseeable future . In May 2016, it was announced that Botha would leave Munster at the end of the 2015–16 season.

=== Move to France ===
After leaving Munster, Botha joined French Top 14 club Lyon ahead of the 2016–17 season, before joining Biarritz, who played in the Rugby Pro D2, France's second tier league, ahead of the 2017–18 season. Botha retired from rugby at the end of the 2017–18 season.

== South Africa ==
Botha has played 25 times for the Springboks and has one try to his name. He was a member of the South Africa squad that won the 2007 Rugby World Cup.

== Barbarians ==
In May 2009, Botha was named in the Barbarians squad to play England and Australia.
