= Denis Hurley (rugby union) =

Irish rugby union player (born 1984)

- Born: 15 July 1984 (age 42) Cork, Ireland
- Height: 1.91 m (6 ft 3 in)
- Weight: 100 kg (16 st; 220 lb)
- School: Castleknock College; St Munchin's College
- University: University College Cork

Rugby union career
- Position(s): Fullback, Wing, Centre
Amateur team(s)
Years	Team	Apps	(Points)
- Cork Constitution
Senior career
Years	Team	Apps	(Points)
2006–2016	Munster	167	(85)
- Correct as of 10 January 2016
International career
Years	Team	Apps	(Points)
2008–2012	Ireland Wolfhounds	9	(15)
2009	Ireland	1	(0)
- Correct as of 18 June 2015

Denis Hurley (born 15 July 1984) is a former Irish rugby union player, who represented Munster and Ireland. He played as a fullback, wing or centre.

== Early life ==
Hurley attended Castleknock College, Dublin, St Patrick's Classical School in Navan and St Munchin's College, Limerick.

== Munster ==
Hurley made his Munster debut against Llanelli Scarlets in May 2006, in a Celtic League fixture. He sprung to notice when he was preferred to Shaun Payne at fullback in Munster's 2007–08 Heineken Cup quarter-final clash with Gloucester. He stayed at fullback for the semi-final against Saracens, and started in the 2008 Heineken Cup Final against Toulouse, which Munster won 16–13.

Hurley was part of the Munster team that won the Celtic League in the 2009–09 season, and again in the 2010–11 season. He also started for Munster in their historic 15–6 victory against Australia on 16 November 2010.

Hurley signed a new two-year contract with Munster in March 2012. He was on the wing for Munster A in their 31–12 2011–12 British and Irish Cup Final victory against Cross Keys on 27 April 2012. Hurley signed a one-year contract extension with Munster in April 2014, which will see him remain with the province until at least June 2015. He signed a further one-year extension with Munster in January 2015. Hurley captained Munster in the 2015 Pro12 Grand Final against Glasgow Warriors on 30 May 2015. In May 2016, Hurley announced he was leaving Munster.

== Ireland ==
Hurley made his Ireland debut against the United States on 31 May 2009 in Santa Clara.

Hurley was also Ireland A's right-winger when they won the 2009 Churchill Cup. He played for Ireland Wolfhounds against Scotland A in January 2011, and against England Saxons in February 2011. His performances in these two fixtures earned him a call-up into Ireland's 2011 Six Nations Championship squad, but he did not feature in any games.

Hurley was selected in the Ireland Wolfhounds squad for their games against the England Saxons in January 2012, which again earned him a call-up to the full Irish squad, for the 2012 Six Nations Championship. Hurley was nominated for the IRUPA Unsung Hero 2015 in April 2015.

== Personal life ==
His father, Jerry Hurley, was a backup for the famous Munster team that defeated the All Blacks 12–0 in October 1978.
