= Rhys Buckley =

Rhys Ivor Buckley
- Born: Rhys Buckley; 18 June 1989 (age 37) Caerphilly Wales
- Height: 183 cm (6 ft 0 in)
- Weight: 108 kg (17 st 0 lb; 238 lb)
- School: Caldicot Comprehensive

Rugby union career
- Current team: Dragons
Senior career
Years	Team	Apps	(Points)
2011–2012	Dragons	16	(5)
2012-2013	Doncaster Knights	0	(0)
2013-2014	Moseley	0	(0)
2014-2018	Dragons	72	(30)
- Correct as of 28 May 2018

Rhys Buckley (born 18 June 1989) is a Welsh rugby union player. He played for Caldicot Youth RFC and captained the side before joining the Dragons regional team having progressed through the Dragons Academy and Under-20 sides. His position is hooker. Buckley was released by the Dragons at the end of the 2011–12 season and subsequently joined Doncaster. For the 2013–14 season he joined Moseley.

In May 2014 Buckley rejoined the Dragons. He was released by the Dragons at the end of the 2017–18 season.
