= Duncan Casey =

Irish rugby union player (born 1990)

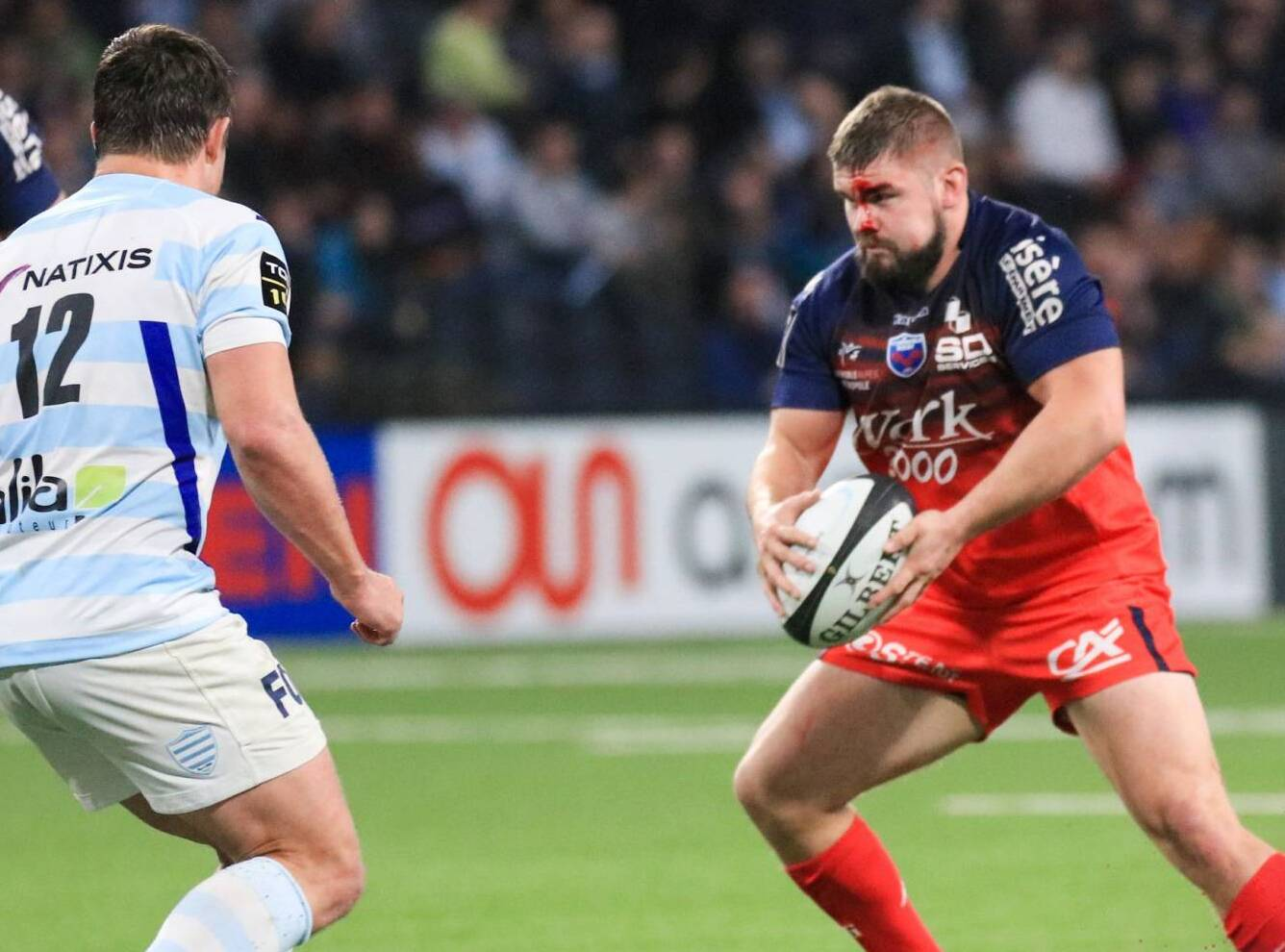
- Born: 14 November 1990 (age 35) Cork, Ireland
- Height: 1.80 m (5 ft 11 in)
- Weight: 105 kg (16.5 st; 231 lb)
- School: Glenstal Abbey School
- University: University of Limerick

Rugby union career
- Position: Hooker
Amateur team(s)
Years	Team	Apps	(Points)
2010–2018	Shannon		
Senior career
Years	Team	Apps	(Points)
2013–2018	Munster	46	(25)
2018–2019	Grenoble	23	(5)
- Correct as of 2 June 2019
International career
Years	Team	Apps	(Points)
2010	Ireland U20	1	(0)
- Correct as of 16 February 2014

Duncan Casey (born 14 November 1990) is a retired Irish rugby union player and current Irish Examiner columnist. He made 46 appearances for his native province Munster and 23 for French club FC Grenoble before finishing his career in 2019.

== Munster ==
Casey graduated from the Munster Academy and secured a development contract with the senior Munster squad for the 2013–14 season. He made his senior debut on 8 December 2013, coming on as a replacement against Perpignan during Round 3 of the 2013–14 Heineken Cup. He made a total of 14 appearances for the province that season and featured in both the Heineken Cup Quarter-Final victory over Toulouse and the Semi-Final defeat to Toulon.

He made his first European start in Munster's Champions Cup game against Sale Sharks on 18 October 2014. He went on to start all six pool games in Munster's Champions Cup campaign and made 20 appearances that season, scoring five tries. He attended an Irish training camp in December 2014 and won the 2015 Munster Rugby Young Player of the Year award in April 2015.

After making his debut in 2013, Casey made 40 appearances for Munster in the following two years. However, his progress was derailed by injuries early on in consecutive seasons. He ruptured his pectoral muscle in the first round of the Champions Cup against Treviso in November 2015 and was sidelined for five months. In the first round of the 2016-2017 Champions Cup against Glasgow the following year, he ruptured his medial cruciate ligament and required more surgery, putting him out of action for another five months. He did not feature for Munster again before his departure.

== Grenoble ==
Casey left Munster in January 2018, having secured a contract at FC Grenoble as injury cover for the remainder of the season. He extended his contract shortly after arriving and remained at Grenoble for the 2018–19 season. Casey announced in April 2019 that he would retire from rugby at the end of the 2018–19 season. He made a total of 23 appearances for Grenoble during his time in France.

== Post-rugby ==
Casey has been a columnist with the Irish Examiner since 2015. He also hosted the Examiner's flagship rugby podcast between January and May 2020 and is a regular contributor to broadcasts such as Second Captains and Newstalk. Casey has worked in communications in recent times and moved to Brussels in 2020. He worked in a public affairs consultancy and subsequently for the European Commission's Directorate-General for Agriculture and Rural Development. He stated on air in November 2022 that he and his wife Sorcha would be moving to Vancouver, Canada in January 2023.

== Other activities ==
Casey has been vocal about a range of issues both during and after his rugby career. While at Munster, he was an Ambassador for the local branch of the Simon Community, a network of homelessness charities throughout Ireland. He wrote several articles about the issue of homelessness in Limerick for the Limerick Leader newspaper. In recognition of his work in this area, he won the Vodafone-sponsored Medal of Excellence at the 2018 Rugby Players Ireland Awards.

Casey actively campaigned for a Yes vote in the 2015 Marriage Equality Referendum and was awarded the Outstanding Male Ally award by the International Federation of Gay Games in October of that year. Casey is a long-time supporter of Palestinian rights and has written articles and appeared in videos that support the BDS movement.

== Honours ==
=== Munster Rugby ===
- Pro12:
  - Runner Up (1): 2014-15

=== FC Grenoble ===
- Rugby Pro D2:
  - Runner Up (1): 2017–18
