= Darragh Fanning =

- Born: Darragh Fanning; 16 July 1986 (age 40) Dublin, Ireland
- Height: 1.91 m (6 ft 3 in)
- Weight: 100 kg (15 st 10 lb)
- School: St Mary's College

Rugby union career
- Position: Wing
Amateur team(s)
| Years | Team | Apps | (Points) |
- St Mary's College
Senior career
| Years | Team | Apps | (Points) |
| 2010–2011 | Connacht | 9 | (0) |
| 2013–2016 | Leinster | 34 | (35) |
- Correct as of 6 October 2015

Darragh Fanning (born 16 July 1986) is a rugby union player from Ireland. His preferred position is on the wing. Fanning currently plays for Irish provincial team Leinster Rugby in the Pro14. Fanning's father, Declan, is also a former Leinster senior player as well as captaining St. Mary's and Ireland 'B'.

During his stint with Connacht, Fanning made eight appearances, playing in the league and the Challenge Cup. He was also part of the Connacht team to play against Samoa. Fanning returned to his club St Mary's College, where he was named as captain for the 2013–14 season before being called up to the Leinster senior squad. He made his senior debut for Leinster on 9 September 2013 against the Welsh side Scarlets in the 2013–14 Pro12.
