= Paddy Butler (rugby union) =

Irish rugby union player (born 1990)

- Born: 1 December 1990 (age 35) Cashel, Ireland
- Height: 1.93 m (6 ft 4 in)
- Weight: 105 kg (16.5 st; 231 lb)
- School: Rockwell College
- University: University of Limerick

Rugby union career
- Position(s): Flanker, Lock, Number 8
Amateur team(s)
Years	Team	Apps	(Points)
- Shannon
Senior career
Years	Team	Apps	(Points)
2010–2015	Munster	64	(35)
2015–2019	Pau	92	(22)
2020–2021	Yamaha Júbilo	4	(0)
2021–2023	Mie Honda Heat	17	(5)
- Correct as of 20 May 2022
International career
Years	Team	Apps	(Points)
2010	Ireland U20	10	(5)
2014	Emerging Ireland	2	(10)
- Correct as of 11 February 2015

Patrick Butler (born 1 December 1990) is an Irish rugby union player, who currently plays for Japanese Rugby League One club Mie Honda Heat. He can play as either a flanker or number 8.

== Early years ==
He was the captain of Rockwell College in the Munster Senior Cup in 2008, having also played senior schools rugby in 2007.

== Professional career ==
=== Munster ===
Butler joined the Munster senior squad on a development contract after being promoted from an academy contract for the 2010–11 season. He made his debut against Connacht on 27 December 2010. He won the Man-of-the-Match award in the 2011–12 British and Irish Cup Final, helping Munster A to a 31–12 win over Cross Keys.

He made his Heineken Cup debut on 13 October 2012, in Munster's opening fixture away to Racing Métro 92. Butler agreed a contract extension with Munster in January 2013. He scored his first try for Munster on 19 April 2013, in a Pro12 fixture against Newport Gwent Dragons.

Butler suffered a broken thumb during Munster's game against Edinburgh in October 2013, ruling him out for 8–10 weeks. He returned from the injury in Munster's game against Connacht on 27 December 2013.

Butler scored the winning try in Munster's 28–24 away win against Cardiff Blues on 1 November 2014. On 30 January 2015, it was announced that Butler would leave Munster at the end of the 2014–15 season, after deciding not to renew his contract.

=== Section Paloise ===
Butler joined French Top 14 side Pau ahead of the 2015–16 season, and left the club upon the conclusion of the 2018–19 season, returning to Ireland and joining up with the Munster pre-season training squad, albeit on a non-contract basis.

=== Yamaha Júbilo ===
Butler joined Japanese Top League side Yamaha Júbilo on a two-year contract in January 2020.

=== Mie Honda Heat ===
Butler moved to Mie Honda Heat, who also play in the Japanese Rugby League One, ahead of the commencement of the 2022 season in January of that year.

== Ireland ==
He has represented Ireland at underage levels up to under-20. Butler played for Ireland at the Under-20 Rugby World Cup in Argentina in June 2010. Butler previously played for Ireland U-18. He was called into the senior Ireland squad for their warm-up game against the Barbarians on 29 May 2012 in Gloucester.

Butler was selected in the Emerging Ireland squad on 26 May 2014. He started in their second game against Uruguay on 18 June 2014, scoring two tries. Butler came off the bench in the 31–10 win against Romania on 22 June 2014, a win that secured the 2014 IRB Nations Cup for Emerging Ireland.

== Honours ==
=== Emerging Ireland ===
- IRB Nations Cup
  - Winner (1): (2014)
