= Gareth Davies (rugby union, born 1984) =

- Born: Gareth Davies; 2 March 1984 (age 42) Caerphilly, Wales
- Height: 1.75 m (5 ft 9 in)
- Weight: 83 kg (13 st 1 lb)

Rugby union career
- Position: Fly-half
Senior career
Years	Team	Apps	(Points)
- Penallta RFC
–	Cardiff RFC		
–	Cardiff Blues		
–	Merthyr RFC		
National sevens team
Years	Team		Comps
2011	Wales		

Gareth Davies (born 2 March 1984) is a Welsh rugby union player. An outside half, he currently plays his club rugby for Merthyr RFC, after beginning his career with Penallta RFC then to Cardiff RFC. He has been selected for the Wales national rugby sevens team squad.
