= Cathal Sheridan (rugby union) =

Irish rugby union coach

- Born: 14 November 1988 (age 37) Sligo, Ireland
- Height: 1.75 m (5 ft 9 in)
- Weight: 83 kg (13.1 st; 183 lb)
- University: University of Limerick

Rugby union career
- Position: Scrum-half
Amateur team(s)
Years	Team	Apps	(Points)
- UL Bohemians
Senior career
Years	Team	Apps	(Points)
2013–2017	Munster	35	(0)
- Correct as of 6 March 2016

Cathal Sheridan (born 14 November 1988) is an Irish former rugby union player and current coach. He played club rugby for UL Bohemians in the All-Ireland League.

== Career ==
Sheridan was a product of the Munster academy, having previously represented Connacht at under-19 level. He was on a development contract for the 2012–13 season, and made his senior Munster debut as a replacement against Edinburgh on 8 February 2013. Sheridan made his first start for Munster on 2 March 2013, against Ospreys in the Pro12, and was added to Munster's 2012–13 Heineken Cup squad in March 2013, before securing a full one-year contract with Munster in early April 2013 for the 2013–14 season.

He signed a new two-year contract with Munster in January 2014, but was ruled out for 3–4 months after having surgery on a broken right forearm in February 2014. Sheridan departed Munster at the end of the 2015–16 season, however, he re-joined the province on a three-month contract in October 2016, before departing the province for a second time upon the completion of the contract in January 2017.

Following his second departure from Munster, Sheridan earned a degree in psychology and a masters in sports psychology from the University of Limerick, and returned to Munster to join their academy setup as a mental skills coach, having participated in a mental health awareness campaign run by Rugby Players Ireland. He also started coaching with Castletroy College and UL Bohemians, becoming director of rugby at the latter.

Sheridan was part of the Tipperary hurling back-room team as a sport psychologist when they won the 2025 All-Ireland Senior Hurling Championship against Cork on 20 July 2025.
