= Eusebio Guiñazú =

Argentine rugby union player (born 1982)

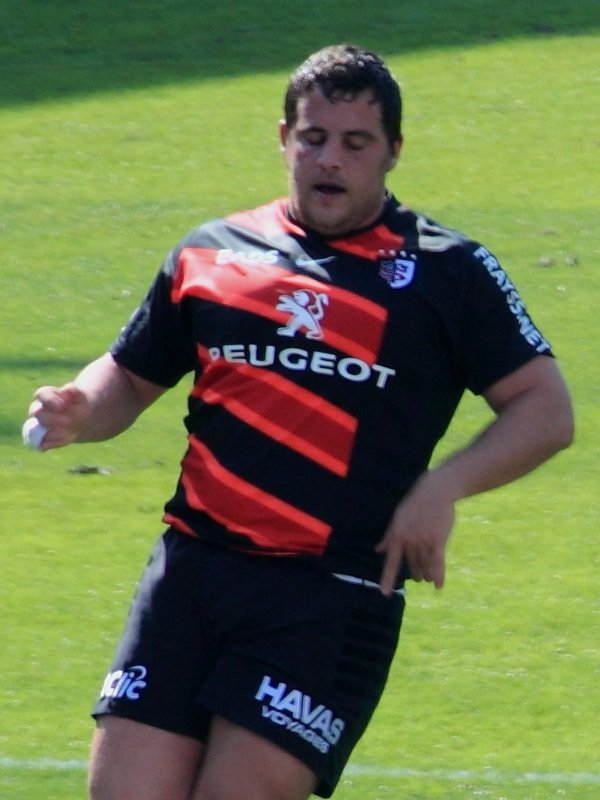
- Full name: Eusebio Guiñazú
- Born: 15 January 1982 (age 44) Mendoza, Argentina
- Height: 1.81 m (5 ft 11 1/2 in)
- Weight: 114 kg (18.0 st; 251 lb)

Rugby union career
- Position(s): Prop, Hooker
Senior career
Years	Team	Apps	(Points)
2000–2005	RC Mendoza		
2005–2006	Toulon	25	(0)
2006–2009	Agen	56	(5)
2010	Stormers	7	(0)
2010	Boland Cavaliers	2	(0)
2010–2011	Biarritz	14	(0)
2011–2012	Toulouse	8	(0)
2012–2014	Bath	5	(0)
2014–2015	Munster	20	(5)
- Correct as of 6 November 2013
International career
Years	Team	Apps	(Points)
2000	Argentina U18	2	(0)
2000–2001	Argentina U19	4	(0)
2002–2003	Argentina U21	15	(15)
2004–2010	Argentina A	6	(5)
2003–present	Argentina	36	(5)
- Correct as of 24 November 2013

Eusebio Guiñazú (born 15 January 1982) is an Argentine rugby union player. His usual position is as a prop or hooker.

== History ==
=== Club career ===
He started his career at Argentine team RC Mendoza.

He turned professional in 2005 and signed for the French Top 14 team Toulon. After just one season at Toulon, he moved to another French team, Agen, where he remained for 3 seasons until he was released in July 2009 due to club's financial problems following their relegation to Pro D2.

He had a short spell back in Mendoza before he signed for South African Super Rugby franchise the Stormers. He played for them during the 2010 Super 14 season, as well as for domestic side Boland Cavaliers in the 2010 Vodacom Cup and 2010 Currie Cup First Division seasons.

At the end of 2010, he returned to France when he joined Biarritz and shortly after moved to Toulouse.

He signed for Bath Rugby on a two-year deal in November 2012.

He joined Irish Pro12 side Munster on a four-month contract in September 2014. He signed a contract extension with Munster in January 2015, meaning he will stay with the province until the end of the 2014–2015 season.

=== International career ===
In 2003, while still playing in Argentina, he earned a call-up to the Argentina national team, making his debut on 27 April against Paraguay in Montevideo.

He was not initially named to the Argentina squad for the 2007 Rugby World Cup, but was called in for the third-place match against France as a replacement for the injured Mario Ledesma.

In 2012 Eusebio was part of the Pumas team that part in the inaugural, The Rugby Championship.
