= Ian Davies (rugby union) =

- Born: Ian Davies; 15 January 1978 (age 48) Bridgend, Wales
- Occupation: Rugby union referee

Rugby union career
Refereeing career
Years	Competition	Apps
2012–	United Rugby Championship	

Ian Davies (born 15 January 1978) is a rugby union referee who represents the Welsh Rugby Union.

== Rugby union career ==
=== Playing career ===
==== Amateur career ====
Davies broke his back playing rugby union when only 20 years old. Both his father and a team-mate suggested he move into refereeing the game.

=== Referee career ===
==== Professional career ====
Davies first game refereeing was Llantwit Major Youth v Llandaff Youth in 1998.

He made his Pro12 debut in April 2012.

He refereed his first 1872 Cup match on 26 December 2016.

== Outside of rugby ==
Davies owns a financial advice practice.
