= Andrew Smith (rugby union, born 1985) =

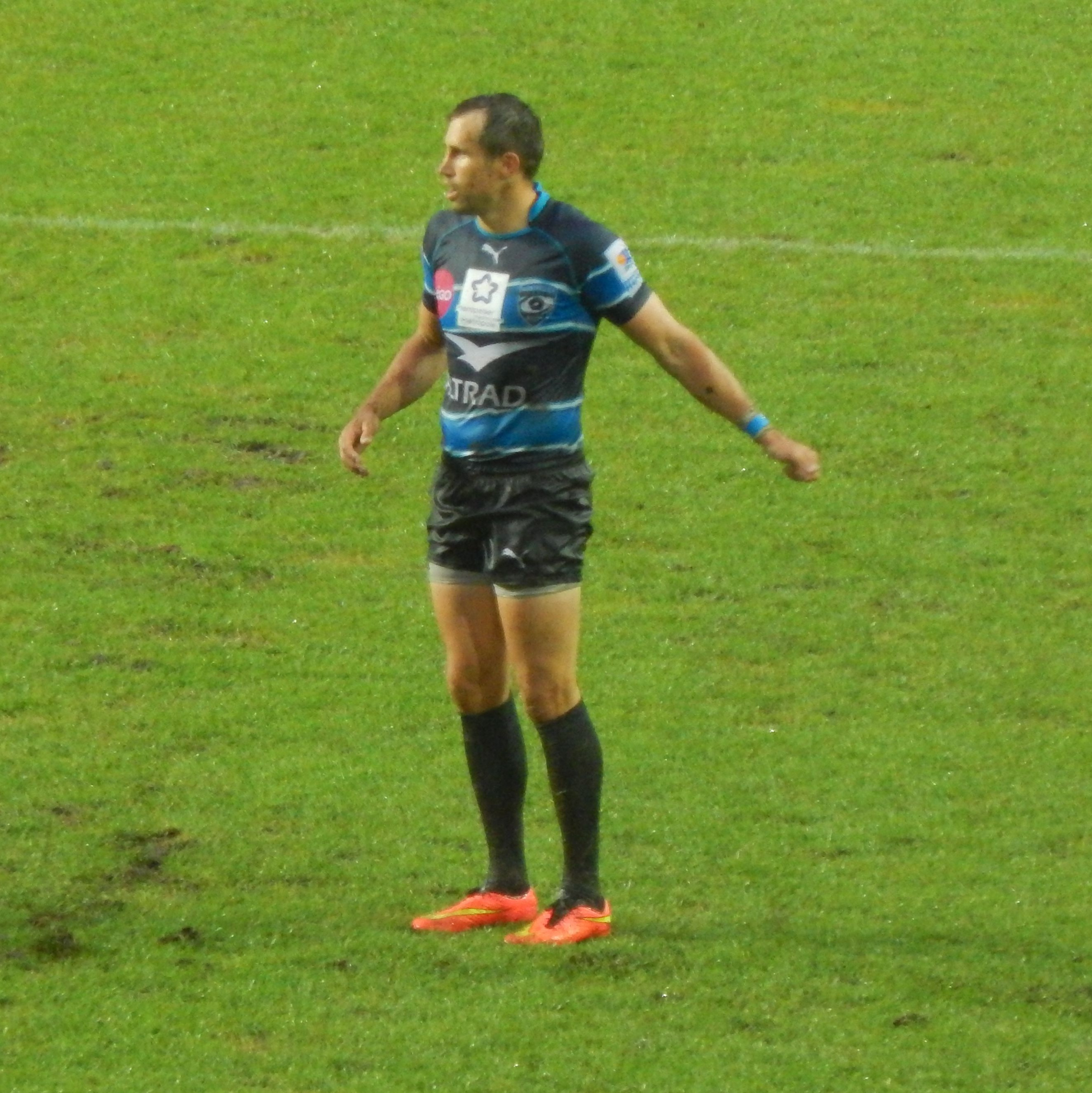
- Born: 10 January 1985 (age 41) Sydney, New South Wales, Australia
- Height: 1.94 m (6 ft 4 in)
- Weight: 104 kg (16.4 st; 229 lb)

Rugby union career
- Position: Centre
Senior career
Years	Team	Apps	(Points)
2007	Central Coast Rays	7	(15)
Provincial / State sides
Years	Team	Apps	(Points)
2014–2015	Munster	21	(30)
2015	Montpellier	8	(5)
- Correct as of 8 November 2015
Super Rugby
Years	Team	Apps	(Points)
2010–2014, 2016–2018	Brumbies	55	(30)
- Correct as of 22 July 2016

Andrew Smith (born 10 January 1985) is an Australian former rugby union player who last played for Australian Super Rugby side the ACT Brumbies. He played as a centre.

== Early life ==
Smith attended Shore School and played junior club rugby for Lindfield Rugby Club and St Ives Rugby Club, representing Gordon District in the annual State Championships.

== Brumbies ==
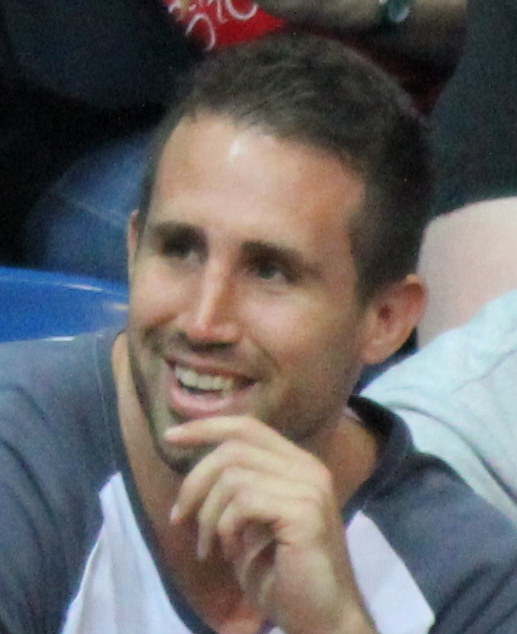

Smith made his Brumbies debut during the 2010 Super 14 season against the Blues in Auckland. After a horror run of injuries, Smith returned during the 2013 Super Rugby season, setting up a crucial try against the British and Irish Lions during a tour game.

== Munster ==
On 1 May 2014, it was announced that Smith would be joining Irish province Munster upon the conclusion of the 2014 Super Rugby season. Smith made his debut for Munster on 5 September 2014, starting in the sides 13–14 defeat in the opening Guinness Pro 12 game against Edinburgh. He scored his first try for Munster on 19 September 2014, against Zebre. He started in Munster's first European Rugby Champions Cup game against Sale Sharks on 18 October 2014. Smith scored a try in Munster's 42–20 win against Connacht on 28 March 2015. Smith played in the final of the Guinness Pro 12, against Glasgow, he scored Munster's only try, and they lost the game 31 to 13.

== Montpellier ==
Smith joined Montpellier Hérault Rugby after leaving Munster. He signed a short-term deal running until 31 October 2015 to provide cover for the senior team during the 2015 Rugby World Cup.

== Return to Brumbies ==
On 1 October 2015, it was announced that Smith will re-join the Brumbies for the 2016 and 2017 Super Rugby seasons, having signed a two-year contract.

== Super Rugby statistics ==
As of 25 July 2016

Season	Team	Games	Starts	Sub	Mins	Tries	Cons	Pens	Drops	Points	Yel	Red
2010	Brumbies	5	3	2	279	0	0	0	0	0	0	0
2011	Brumbies	9	8	1	633	2	0	0	0	10	0	0
2012	Brumbies	16	15	1	1208	4	0	0	0	20	0	0
2013	Brumbies	7	4	3	252	0	0	0	0	0	0	0
2014	Brumbies	13	2	11	230	0	0	0	0	0	0	0
2016	Brumbies	5	0	5	56	0	0	0	0	0	0	0
Total		55	32	23	2688	6	0	0	0	30	0	0
