= 2015–16 Munster Rugby season =

- Ground(s): Thomond Park; Musgrave Park (Capacity: 26,500; 8,500)
- Coach: Anthony Foley
- Captain: Peter O'Mahony
- League: Pro 12
- 2015–16: 6th
| 1st kit | 2nd kit |

The 2015–16 Munster Rugby season was Munster's fifteenth season competing in the Pro12 alongside which they also competed in the European Rugby Champions Cup. It was Anthony Foley's second season as head coach.

== Events ==
Munster opened their pre-season with a 29–38 defeat to Grenoble in a friendly at Thomond Park on 14 August. A week later on 21 August, Munster suffered a 28–12 defeat to Connacht in their second pre-season friendly at Thomond Park. On 28 August, Munster defeated London Irish 21–15 at Irish Independent Park in their final warm-up match for the new season.

The new Pro12 season was launched in London on 24 August. Munster began the new season with an 18–13 win against Benetton Treviso in Cork on 5 September. Munster were captained by CJ Stander in the opening match, where he also scored two second-half tries and earned the Man-of-the-Match award.

In January, Andy Farrell joined the province in an advisory role on a part-time basis over four months before taking up his four-year contract with Ireland in the summer

On 25 March, Simon Zebo scored two tries against Zebre to bring his total to 43 tries in 97 provincial appearances. In doing so, he overtook Anthony Horgan's try-scoring record of 41 for Munster.

On 24 April, it was announced that Johan Erasmus will join Munster as the newly created Director of Rugby role in a three-year deal beginning on 1 July.

On 7 May, Munster secured their place in 2016-17 Champions Cup after a 31–15 victory over the Scarlets at Thomond Park earned them a sixth-place finish in the Pro12.

On 2 June, Munster Rugby announced a forecasted deficit of €1.9 million for the year ending 30 June 2016 at their Annual General Meeting in Limerick.

== Coaching and management staff 2015–16 ==
| Position | Name | Nationality |
|---|---|---|
| Head coach | Anthony Foley | Ireland |
| Team manager | Niall O'Donovan | Ireland |
| Scrum Coach | Jerry Flannery | Ireland |
| Backs Coach | Brian Walsh | Ireland |
| Assistant coach | Ian Costello | Ireland |
| Technical Advisor | Mick O'Driscoll | Ireland |
| Head of Fitness | Aled Walters | Wales |
| Strength & conditioning coach | Aidan O'Connell | Ireland |
| Strength & conditioning coach | Adam Sheehan | Ireland |
| Performance analyst | George Murray | Ireland |
| Operations manager | Bryan Murphy | Ireland |

== Senior Playing Squad 2015–16 ==
Note: Flags indicate national union under World Rugby eligibility rules. Players may hold more than one non-World Rugby nationality.

| Player | Position | Union |
|---|---|---|
| Duncan Casey | Hooker | Ireland |
| Kevin O'Byrne | Hooker | Ireland |
| Niall Scannell | Hooker | Ireland |
| **Mike Sherry** | Hooker | Ireland |
| **Stephen Archer** | Prop | Ireland |
| **BJ Botha** | Prop | South Africa |
| **James Cronin** | Prop | Ireland |
| **Dave Kilcoyne** | Prop | Ireland |
| Peter McCabe | Prop | Ireland |
| John Ryan | Prop | Ireland |
| **Mario Sagario** | Prop | Uruguay |
| **Mark Chisholm** | Lock | Australia |
| **Dave Foley** | Lock | Ireland |
| Billy Holland | Lock | Ireland |
| **Donncha O'Callaghan** | Lock | Ireland |
| **Donnacha Ryan** | Lock | Ireland |
| Shane Buckley | Flanker | Ireland |
| Jordan Coghlan | Flanker | Ireland |
| Sean Doyle | Flanker | Australia |
| Dave O'Callaghan | Flanker | Ireland |
| **Tommy O'Donnell** | Flanker | Ireland |
| **Peter O'Mahony** (c) | Flanker | Ireland |
| **Robin Copeland** | Number 8 | Ireland |
| Jack O'Donoghue | Number 8 | Ireland |
| CJ Stander | Number 8 | South Africa |

| Player | Position | Union |
|---|---|---|
| **Conor Murray** | Scrum-half | Ireland |
| **Tomás O'Leary** | Scrum-half | Ireland |
| Cathal Sheridan | Scrum-half | Ireland |
| Duncan Williams | Scrum-half | Ireland |
| Jonathan Holland | Fly-half | Ireland |
| **Ian Keatley** | Fly-half | Ireland |
| Cian Bohane | Centre | Ireland |
| Tyler Bleyendaal | Centre | New Zealand |
| Matt D'Arcy | Centre | Ireland |
| **Keith Earls** | Centre | Ireland |
| **Denis Hurley** | Centre | Ireland |
| **Francis Saili** | Centre | New Zealand |
| **Lucas González Amorosino** | Wing | Argentina |
| Andrew Conway | Wing | Ireland |
| Shane Monahan | Wing | Ireland |
| Ronan O'Mahony | Wing | Ireland |
| Darren Sweetnam | Wing | Ireland |
| Gerhard van den Heever | Wing | South Africa |
| **Simon Zebo** | Wing | Ireland |
| **Felix Jones** | Fullback | Ireland |

- Internationally capped players in **bold**.
- Players qualified to play for Ireland on residency or dual nationality. *
- Irish provinces are currently limited to 4 non-Irish eligible (NIE) players and 1 non-Irish qualified player (NIQ or "Project Player").

== 2015–16 Pro12 ==
The new Pro12 season began on 5 September.

5 September 2015
19:45

| Munster (Ireland) | 18–13 | (Italy) Benetton Treviso (1 BP) |
| Try: Stander (2) 46' m, 53' c Con: Keatley (1/2); Pen: Keatley (2/3) 6', 25' | Report | Try: Budd 10' c Con: Hayward (1/1); Pen: Hayward (2/3) 71', 80' |

Irish Independent Park
Attendance: 5,425
Referee: Lloyd Linton (SRU)

13 September 2015
14:30

| (1 BP) Ospreys (Wales) | 18–20 | (Ireland) Munster |
| Pen: Davies (6/6) 9', 35', 40', 46', 62', 70' | Report | Try: Fitzgerald 52' c Stander 79' c Con: Bleyendaal (1/1); Keatley (1/1); Pen: Bleyendaal (2/2) 12', 31' |

Liberty Stadium
Attendance: 8,107
Referee: Dudley Phillips (IRFU)

2 October 2015
18:00

| Munster (Ireland) | 23–21 | (Scotland) Glasgow Warriors (1 BP) |
| Try: O'Callaghan 28' c Botha 66' c Con: Keatley (2/2); Pen: Keatley (3/4) 19', 40', 77' | Report | Pen: Clegg (6/7) 12', 32', 38', 51', 55', 60'; Drop: Clegg (1/1) 74' |

Thomond Park
Attendance: 11,713
Referee: Ben Whitehouse (WRU)

23 October 2015
19:05

| Scarlets (Wales) | 25–22 | (Ireland) Munster (1 BP) |
| Try: Van der Merwe 41' m T. Williams 53' m Pen: S. Shingler (5/6) 27', 40', 60', 77', 80' | Report | Try: Conway 25' c Con: Keatley (1/1); Pen: Keatley (4/6) 5', 29', 48', 72'; Drop: Keatley (1/2) 58' |

Parc y Scarlets
Attendance: 6,466
Referee: Gary Conway (IRFU)

30 October 2015
18:00

| (1 BP) Munster (Ireland) | 32–28 | (Ireland) Ulster (2 BP) |
| Try: Conway 16' c Copeland 29' c Van den Heever 33' m Hurley 60' m Zebo 65' m Con: Keatley (2/5); Pen: Keatley (1/1) 49' | Report | Try: Gilroy (2) 2' m, 26' m Williams 38' m Tuohy 67' c Con: Pad. Jackson (1/4); Pen: Pad. Jackson (1/1) 20'; Drop: Pad. Jackson (1/1) 45' |

Thomond Park
Attendance: 13,039
Referee: Marius Mitrea (FIR)

7 November 2015
17:15

| (1 BP) Edinburgh (Scotland) | 14–16 | (Ireland) Munster |
| Try: Helu 46' m Pen: Hidalgo-Clyne (3/3) 10', 39', 56' | Report | Try: J. Ryan 7' c Con: Keatley (1/1); Pen: Keatley (3/4) 29', 61', 67' |

Murrayfield Stadium
Attendance: 4,981
Referee: David Wilkinson (IRFU)

28 November 2015
17:15

| (1 BP) Munster (Ireland) | 12–18 | (Ireland) Connacht |
| Try: Scannell 20' m penalty try 65' c Con: Keatley (1/2) | Report | Try: O'Halloran 17' c Aki 77' m Con: Ronaldson (1/2); Pen: Ronaldson (2/3) 11', 58' |

Thomond Park
Attendance: 15,143
Referee: Ben Whitehouse (WRU)

6 December 2015
14:30

| Newport Gwent Dragons (Wales) | 22–6 | (Ireland) Munster |
| Try: Landman 77' c Con: D. Jones (1/1); Pen: D. Jones (3/4) 1', 30', 64'; Tovey (1/1) 80'; Drop: D. Jones (1/3) 43' | Report | Pen: R. Scannell (2/2) 13', 38' |

Rodney Parade
Attendance: 5,571
Referee: Gary Conway (IRFU)

27 December 2015
17:15

| Munster (Ireland) | 7–24 | (Ireland) Leinster |
| Try: Copeland 37' c Con: R. Scannell (1/1) | Report | Try: Nacewa 3' c J. McGrath 54' c Kirchner 80' c Con: Madigan (3/3); Pen: Madigan (1/1) 14' |

Thomond Park
Attendance: 25,600
Referee: David Wilkinson (IRFU)

2 January 2016
15:00

| (1 BP) Ulster (Ireland) | 7–9 | (Ireland) Munster |
| Try: Ludik 23' c Con: Pad. Jackson (1/1) | Report | Pen: Keatley (2/2) 8', 60'; Drop: Keatley (1/1) 57' |

Kingspan Stadium
Attendance: 17,211
Referee: Gary Conway (IRFU)

30 January 2016
15:00

| (1 BP) Zebre (Italy) | 12–16 | (Ireland) Munster |
| Pen: Haimona (4/5) 12', 15', 19', 29' | Report | Try: Chisholm 5' c Con: Keatley (1/1); Pen: Keatley (2/4) 21', 36'; Drop: Keatley (1/1) 71' |

Stadio Sergio Lanfranchi
Attendance: 2,400
Referee: Dudley Phillips (IRFU)

14 February 2016
17:00

| (1 BP) Munster (Ireland) | 17–21 | (Wales) Ospreys |
| Try: Williams 11' c Saili 26' m Copeland 50' m Con: Keatley (1/3) | Report | Try: S. Davies 24' c Watkin 59' m Con: S. Davies (1/2); Pen: S. Davies (3/4) 37', 55', 77' |

Irish Independent Park
Attendance: 7,791
Referee: Leighton Hodges (WRU)

19 February 2016
19:35

| (1 BP) Glasgow Warriors (Scotland) | 27–24 | (Ireland) Munster (1 BP) |
| Try: Puafisi (2) 4' c, 7' c Weir 43' m G. Bryce 70' m Con: Weir (2/4); Pen: Weir (1/3) 62' | Report | Try: Kilcoyne (2) 11' c, 23' c Sherry 63' c Con: Keatley (3/3); Pen: Keatley (1/1) 17' |

Rugby Park
Attendance: 7,212
Referee: Ben Whitehouse (WRU)

28 February 2016
15:00

| (1 BP) Benetton Treviso (Italy) | 13–16 | (Ireland) Munster |
| Try: Barbieri 25' c Con: Hayward (1/1); Pen: Hayward (2/2) 52', 64' | Report | Try: Van den Heever 11' m Saili 57' m Pen: Keatley (2/2) 68', 75' |

Stadio Comunale di Monigo
Attendance: 1,000
Referee: Ian Davies (WRU)

5 March 2016
19:35

| (1 BP) Munster (Ireland) | 26–5 | (Wales) Newport Gwent Dragons |
| Try: Kilcoyne (2) 18' m, 43' c R. Scannell 32' c Cronin 77' c Con: Keatley (2/3); J. Holland (1/1) | Report | Try: Amos 46' m |

Thomond Park
Attendance: 13,552
Referee: Marius Mitrea (FIR)

18 March 2016
19:15

| (1 BP) Cardiff Blues (Wales) | 37–28 | (Ireland) Munster |
| Try: Cook 32' c Rees 49' c G. Smith 54' c Patchell 73' c Con: Patchell (4/4); Pen: Patchell (2/2) 10', 43'; J. Evans (1/1) 80' | Report | Try: Sweetnam 6' m Sherry 52' c O'Donoghue 78' c Con: Keatley (1/2); J. Holland (1/1); Pen: Keatley (2/2) 3', 46'; J. Holland (1/1) 67' |

Cardiff Arms Park
Attendance: 5,017
Referee: David Wilkinson (IRFU)

25 March 2016
19:00

| (1 BP) Munster (Ireland) | 47–0 | (Italy) Zebre |
| Try: penalty try (2) 11' c, 73' c R. O'Mahony 26' c Zebo (2) 47' c, 53' c Stander 55' m Murray 64' c Con: J. Holland (5/5); Murray (1/2) | Report |

Thomond Park
Attendance: 13,063
Referee: Dudley Phillips (IRFU)

2 April 2016
17:30

| Leinster (Ireland) | 16–13 | (Ireland) Munster (1 BP) |
| Try: Sexton 36' c Con: Sexton (1/1); Pen: Sexton (3/3) 27', 50', 63' | Report | Try: J. Holland 47' c Con: J. Holland (1/1); Pen: J. Holland (2/2) 12', 31' |

Aviva Stadium
Attendance: 43,108
Referee: Ian Davies (WRU)

16 April 2016
19:15

| (1 BP) Connacht (Ireland) | 35–14 | (Ireland) Munster |
| Try: Adeolokun (2) 36' c, 54' m penalty try 40' c Bealham 65' c Con: O'Leary (3/4); Pen: O'Leary (3/3) 8', 18', 80' | Report | Try: Zebo 10' c Sherry 23' c Con: J. Holland (2/2) |

Galway Sportsgrounds
Attendance: 7,786
Referee: Ben Whitehouse (WRU)

29 April 2016
19:35

| (1 BP) Munster (Ireland) | 27–19 | (Scotland) Edinburgh |
| Try: R. Scannell 6' c Zebo 27' m Conway 33' m Saili 76' c Con: J. Holland (2/4); Pen: J. Holland (1/1) 21' | Report | Try: Tovey 18' c Con: Tovey (1/1); Pen: Tovey (3/4) 14', 37', 43'; Hidalgo-Clyne (1/1) 64' |

Irish Independent Park
Attendance: 8,200
Referee: Ian Davies (WRU)

7 May 2016
15:00

| (1 BP) Munster (Ireland) | 31–15 | (Wales) Scarlets |
| Try: Saili 13' c R. Scannell (2) 25' m, 78' c R. O'Mahony 59' m Stander 68' m Con: J. Holland (2/5) | Report | Pen: S. Shingler (5/5) 9', 21', 28', 37', 64' |

Thomond Park
Attendance: 18,929
Referee: Nigel Owens (WRU)

== 2015–16 European Rugby Champions Cup ==
The draw for the 2015-16 European Rugby Champions Cup was held on 17 June. Munster will face Stade Francais, Leicester Tigers and Benetton Treviso. Munster opened their campaign on 14 November against Benetton Treviso at Thomond Park and won the game on a 32–7 scoreline with a bonus point secured after a late try by Simon Zebo in a match played in wet and windy conditions. On 17 November, Stade Français postponed their Champions Cup clash with Munster on 22 November in the wake of the Paris attacks. On 12 December, Munster lost to Leicester Tigers at Thomond Park by 31–19. On 9 January, Munster were eliminated from the European Rugby Champions Cup after a 27–7 defeat to Stade Français in Stade Jean-Bouin in Paris. Stade Francais played 40 minutes of the game with 14 men after Josaia Raisuqe's received a red card but outscored their Munster 17-7 during that period. A week later on 16 January, Munster defeated Stade Français at Thomond Park 26–13 to avoid a fourth straight defeat in the competition. Munster finished their European Champions Cup campaign with a bonus-point triumph away to Treviso on 24 January.

| Team | P | W | D | L | PF | PA | Diff | TF | TA | TB | LB | Pts |
|---|---|---|---|---|---|---|---|---|---|---|---|---|
| (England) Leicester Tigers (2) | 6 | 5 | 0 | 1 | 185 | 91 | +94 | 24 | 11 | 3 | 0 | 23 |
| (France) Stade Français (7) | 6 | 4 | 0 | 2 | 186 | 118 | +68 | 25 | 17 | 3 | 0 | 19 |
| (Ireland) Munster | 6 | 3 | 0 | 3 | 118 | 100 | +18 | 15 | 11 | 3 | 0 | 15 |
| (Italy) Benetton Treviso | 6 | 0 | 0 | 6 | 53 | 233 | –180 | 8 | 33 | 0 | 0 | 0 |

14 November 2015
17:15

| (1 BP) Munster (Ireland) | 32–7 | (Italy) Benetton Treviso |
| Try: Botha 4' c Stander 55' m Casey 68' c Zebo 75' c Con: Keatley (3/4) 5', 69', 77'; Pen: Keatley (2/2) 19', 48' | Report | Try: Steyn 16' c Con: Hayward (1/1) 16' |

Thomond Park
Attendance: 17,763
Referee: Matthew Carley (RFU)

12 December 2015
19:45

| Munster (Ireland) | 19–31 | (England) Leicester Tigers |
| Try: Cronin 41' m Sherry 66' m Con: Keatley (0/2); Pen: Keatley (3/4) 13', 18', 45' | Report | Try: Goneva 33' m Fitzgerald 37' c B. Youngs 53' c Con: O. Williams (2/3) 39', 54'; Pen: O. Williams (2/2) 1', 28'; Bell (2/2) 69', 75' |

Thomond Park
Attendance: 22,261
Referee: Romain Poite (FFR)

20 December 2015
17:15

| Leicester Tigers (England) | 17–6 | (Ireland) Munster |
| Try: Slater 23' c Goneva 65' c Con: Burns (2/2) 24', 66'; Pen: Burns (1/2) 35' | Report | Pen: Keatley (2/4) 6', 40' |

Welford Road
Attendance: 21,645
Referee: Jérôme Garcès (FFR)

9 January 2016
17:45

| Stade Français (France) | 27–7 | (Ireland) Munster |
| Try: Williams 32' c Macalou 66' c Bonneval 70' c Con: Steyn (3/3) 33', 67', 72'; Pen: Steyn (2/3) 36', 54' | Report | Try: Murray 74' c Con: R. Scannell (1/1) 75' |

Stade Jean-Bouin
Attendance: 13,820
Referee: Nigel Owens (WRU)

16 January 2016
13:00

| (1 BP) Munster (Ireland) | 26–13 | (France) Stade Français |
| Try: Sherry 18' m Earls 39' c Zebo 41' c Stander 67' c Con: Keatley (3/4) 40', 42', 68' | Report | Try: Ross 62' c Con: Steyn (1/1) 63'; Pen: Steyn (2/3) 1', 36' |

Thomond Park
Attendance: 18,884
Referee: JP Doyle (RFU)

24 January 2016
14:00

| Benetton Treviso (Italy) | 5–28 | (Ireland) Munster (1 BP) |
| Try: Lazzaroni 36' m | Report | Try: R. O'Mahony (2) 4' c, 65' c Kilcoyne 16' c Murray 49' c Con: Keatley (4/4) 4', 16', 49', 66' |

Stadio Comunale di Monigo
Attendance: 3,200
Referee: Alexandre Ruiz (FFR)
