= 2015–16 Pro12 =

Professional rugby union competition

- Countries: Ireland; Italy; Scotland; Wales
- Date: 5 September 2015 – 28 May 2016
- Champions: Connacht (1st title)
- Runners-up: Leinster
- Matches played: 135
- Attendance: 1,144,802 (average 8,480 per match)
- Highest attendance: 68,262 – Judgement Day (30 April 2016)
- Lowest attendance: 1,000 – Treviso v Munster (28 February 2016)
- Tries scored: 613 (average 4.5 per match)
- Top point scorer: Rhys Patchell (Cardiff Blues) (174 points)
- Top try scorer: Craig Gilroy (Ulster); Matt Healy (Connacht) (10 tries each)

Official website
- www.pro12rugby.com

The 2015–16 Pro12 (also known as the Guinness Pro12 for sponsorship reasons) was the fifteenth season of the professional rugby union competition originally known as the Celtic League, and the sixth with its current four-country format. it was the second season to be referred to as the Guinness Pro12.

The twelve competing teams were the four Irish teams: Connacht, Leinster, Munster and Ulster; two Italian teams: Benetton Treviso and Zebre; two Scottish teams: Edinburgh and Glasgow Warriors and four Welsh teams: Cardiff Blues, Newport Gwent Dragons, Ospreys and Scarlets. The first stage involved the twelve teams playing home and away in a league format with the top four sides qualifying for the semi-finals. The semi finals were one legged affairs with 1st playing 4th and 2nd playing 3rd and the higher ranked team gaining home advantage. The winners of the semi-finals proceeded to the Pro12 final, held at Murrayfield Stadium in Edinburgh, Scotland.

Glasgow were the defending champions having beaten Munster 31–13 in the previous season's play-off final, taking their first Pro12 title. They were unable to defend their title, after losing 16–11 to Connacht in the play-off semi-final. Connacht – who qualified for the play-offs for the first time – then proceeded to defeat Leinster 20–10 in the final, to become the seventh team to win the league title. Connacht had one of the top try scorers for the season, as Matt Healy and along with Ulster's Craig Gilroy, each scored 10 tries during the season. Rhys Patchell of Cardiff Blues was the competition's top points scorer, with 174.

== Changes for the season ==
=== All countries ===
With the 2015 Rugby World Cup taking place during the opening months of the season, changes were made to the usual fixture schedule to minimise the effect on teams who released players to take part. The low number of games in the opening weeks of the season led to fixture congestion at the end of the tournament, with teams playing a game every weekend for 16 weeks straight from October 2015 to January 2016, including European matches.

As in the previous season, qualification to the Champions Cup was guaranteed to the top team from each country participating in the league, with the three highest placed teams not already qualified also earning a berth. Unlike in the previous season where the 20th tournament spot was decided by a play-off involving teams from the Pro12, France's Top 14, and the English Premiership, due to fixture congestion from the World Cup, the final spot in the tournament was reserved for the winner of the 2015 Challenge Cup if not already qualified.

=== Ireland ===
Connacht came into the season without their long-serving forwards coach Dan McFarland, following his move to Glasgow Warriors. McFarland had been with Connacht as a player and later coach since 2000. It was also the team's first season in the competition without Michael Swift, their former captain who retired as the record holder for appearances both in the league and for the province.

Following a disappointing 2014–15 season, Leinster terminated the contract of head coach Matt O'Connor. Former captain and previous season's forwards coach Leo Cullen was initially named as temporary head coach following the dismissal, before being named to the position permanently on a two-year deal. With the previous season's captain Jamie Heaslip missing the start of the season to play for Ireland at the World Cup, Kevin McLaughlin was named captain of the team. After suffering a concussion in the first game of the season however, McLaughlin was forced to retire from the game, and was replaced in the role by Isa Nacewa who rejoined Leinster after returning from retirement. The season also saw the departure of Gordon D'Arcy, record holder for appearances for the province. D'Arcy had announced his intention to retire after the World Cup earlier in the year, but ultimately didn't make the final Irish squad and played with Leinster until the conclusion of the tournament.

Munster captain Peter O'Mahony missed the early season due to the World Cup, and suffered a serious injury in Ireland's game against France. South Africa-born player CJ Stander, who became Irish-qualified during the course of the season, served as captain in his place. The close season also saw the departure of long-serving players Donncha O'Callaghan and Paul O'Connell, both of whom had played for the province since before the league's foundation. O'Callaghan, the province's record holder for appearances, was released from the final year of his contract to join newly promoted English Premiership side Worcester Warriors. Like O'Callaghan, O'Connell was released from the final year of his contract on request. He agreed a deal to join Toulon after the World Cup on a two-year deal, but an injury suffered at the tournament ultimately forced him to retire from the game before he could play for them.

Over a year after the departures of David Humphreys and Mark Anscombe, Les Kiss took over as Ulster Director of Rugby in October 2015. Neil Doak, who had served as head coach while Kiss continued in his role as Ireland defence coach, remained on the coaching staff working under him. With Rory Best away at the World Cup during the start of the season, Rob Herring was named captain on an interim basis.

=== Italy ===
Benetton Treviso's captain Antonio Pavanello retired from playing at the end of the previous season, taking up a role as Sporting Director. Alessandro Zanni was named as his replacement, with Davide Giazzon and Edoardo Gori as his vice-captains. With all three players away representing Italy in the World Cup, the role was taken by Alberto De Marchi for the early part of the tournament. Umberto Casellato was the team coach at the beginning of the season but was sacked in January 2016, being replaced with Marius Goosen.

At the start of the season George Biagi replaced Marco Bortolami as Zebre's captain. Following the replacement of head coach Andrea Cavinato with Víctor Jiménez during the course of the previous season, Gianluca Guidi entered the tournament as the team's new coach.

=== Scotland ===
It was reported during the summer of 2015 that Edinburgh may play some of their home games in Hibernian F.C.'s Easter Road during the season with a view to a permanent ground sharing deal. This is due to Murrayfield Stadium having a capacity of over 67,000 while Edinburgh's home games draw average home crowds of around 4,000. No deal was finalised however, and all of the team's home games were again played at Murrayfield.

Reigning champions Glasgow Warriors came into the season without an appointed captain, following the retirement of Alastair Kellock. Gregor Townsend named Peter Murchie as captain for the duration of the World Cup, with the intention of naming a permanent successor after his international players had returned. In November 2015, it was announced that Jonny Gray would take over the captaincy. During the season, Glasgow were forced to play some home matches in the Pro12 and Champions Cup in Kilmarnock F.C.'s Rugby Park due to heavy rainfall making Scotstoun unplayable.

=== Wales ===
Following the departure of Director of Rugby Mark Hammett in February 2015, for personal reasons, Cardiff Blues appointed Danny Wilson their head coach ahead of the new season, replacing caretakers Dale McIntosh and Paul John. The new season also saw veteran prop Gethin Jenkins named captain, replacing Matthew Rees. With Jenkins away at the World Cup with Wales, Josh Navidi captained the team in their early games.

Newport Gwent Dragons captain Lee Byrne was forced to retire in April 2015 after he failed to recover from a shoulder injury. It was announced in July 2015 that Welsh international T. Rhys Thomas would captain the side for the 2015–16 season.

Ospreys captain Alun Wyn Jones missed the start of the season while playing for Wales at the World Cup. In his absence, the side was captained by Lloyd Ashley. Ashley had previously taken on the role at under-age level and in the Anglo-Welsh Cup.

Both Scarlets captain Ken Owens and vice-captain Scott Williams went to the World Cup with Wales, missing the opening rounds of the league. New Zealand born centre Hadleigh Parkes captained the side until their return.

== Teams ==
Location of 2015–16 Pro12 teams in Great Britain and Ireland.	Location of 2015–16 Pro12 teams in Italy
Winners; 2nd–4th place; Other teams.

Team	Coach / Director of Rugby	Captain	Stadium	Capacity
(Italy) Benetton Treviso	(South Africa) Marius Goosen (For (Italy) Umberto Casellato) (Note: Umberto Casellato began the tournament as Benetton Treviso head coach, but was sacked on 5 January 2016, and replaced by Marius Goosen.)	(Italy) Alessandro Zanni (Note: In Zanni's absence due to the 2015 Rugby World Cup, Alberto De Marchi was named temporary captain until after Zanni returned from World Cup duty.)	Stadio Comunale di Monigo	6,700
(Wales) Cardiff Blues	(England) Danny Wilson	(Wales) Gethin Jenkins (Note: Josh Navidi was named temporary captain while Jenkins was absent for the 2015 Rugby World Cup.)	BT Sport Cardiff Arms Park	12,500
(Ireland) Connacht	(Samoa) Pat Lam	(Ireland) John Muldoon	Galway Sportsgrounds	7,800
(Scotland) Edinburgh	(South Africa) Alan Solomons	(New Zealand) Mike Coman	Murrayfield Stadium	67,144 (Note: Although Murrayfield's full capacity is 67,144, only the lower section of the West Stand, with a capacity of 12,464, is generally opened for Edinburgh fixtures.)
(Scotland) Glasgow Warriors	(Scotland) Gregor Townsend	(Scotland) Jonny Gray (Note: Peter Murchie was named temporary captain for the duration of 2015 Rugby World Cup while Gray was away on Scottish duty.)	Scotstoun Stadium; Rugby Park (Note: Due to adverse weather in Glasgow, Scotstoun Stadium became unplayable, with some of the Warriors games moved to Rugby Park in Kilmarnock.)	10,000; 17,921
(Ireland) Leinster	(Ireland) Leo Cullen	(Fiji) Isa Nacewa (Note: Kevin McLaughlin was named temporary captain while much of the first team was absent for the 2015 Rugby World Cup. However, after suffering a concussion in the first game of the season, McLaughlin was forced to retire, with Isa Nacewa taking over the role for the remainder of the World Cup. Following the World Cup's conclusion, Nacewa retained the role on a permanent basis.)	RDS Arena; Aviva Stadium	18,500; 51,700
(Ireland) Munster	(Ireland) Anthony Foley	(Ireland) CJ Stander	Thomond Park; Irish Independent Park	25,630; 9,251
(Wales) Newport Gwent Dragons	(Wales) Lyn Jones	(Wales) T. Rhys Thomas	Rodney Parade	8,800
(Wales) Ospreys	(Wales) Steve Tandy	(Wales) Alun Wyn Jones (Note: Lloyd Ashley was named temporary captain while Alun Wyn Jones was absent for the 2015 Rugby World Cup.)	Liberty Stadium	20,827
(Wales) Scarlets	(New Zealand) Wayne Pivac	(Wales) Ken Owens (Note: Hadleigh Parkes was named temporary captain while Ken Owens was absent for the 2015 Rugby World Cup.)	Parc y Scarlets	14,870
(Ireland) Ulster	(Australia) Les Kiss (Note: Neil Doak served as head coach while Les Kiss was with Ireland at the 2015 Rugby World Cup. When Ireland were eliminated, Kiss took over as Director of Rugby, with Doak staying on.)	(Ireland) Rory Best (Note: Rob Herring was named temporary captain while Rory Best was absent for the 2015 Rugby World Cup.)	Kingspan Stadium	18,196
(Italy) Zebre	(Italy) Gianluca Guidi	(Italy) George Biagi	Stadio Sergio Lanfranchi	5,000

== Table ==
2015–16 Pro12
	Team	Played	Won	Drawn	Lost	Points For	Points Against	Points Diff	Tries For	Tries Against	Try Bonus	Losing Bonus	Points
1	(Ireland) Leinster (RU)	22	16	0	6	458	290	+168	51	27	6	3	73
2	(Ireland) Connacht (CH)	22	15	0	7	507	406	+101	60	46	8	5	73
3	(Scotland) Glasgow Warriors (SF)	22	14	1	7	557	380	+177	68	37	8	6	72
4	(Ireland) Ulster (SF)	22	14	0	8	488	307	+181	61	29	8	5	69
5	(Wales) Scarlets	22	14	0	8	477	458	+19	45	54	2	5	63
6	(Ireland) Munster	22	13	0	9	459	417	+42	56	36	6	5	63
7	(Wales) Cardiff Blues	22	11	0	11	542	461	+81	62	53	5	7	56
8	(Wales) Ospreys	22	11	1	10	490	455	+35	55	49	6	3	55
9	(Scotland) Edinburgh	22	11	0	11	405	366	+39	41	36	2	8	54
10	(Wales) Newport Gwent Dragons	22	4	0	18	353	492	−139	33	57	0	10	26
11	(Italy) Zebre	22	5	0	17	308	718	−410	35	99	3	1	24
12	(Italy) Benetton Treviso	22	3	0	19	320	614	−294	35	79	0	8	20
If teams are level at any stage, tiebreakers are applied in the following order: 1. number of matches won; 2. the difference between points for and points against; 3. the number of tries scored; 4. the most points scored; 5. the difference between tries for and tries against; 6. the fewest red cards received; 7. the fewest yellow cards received.
Green background (rows 1 to 4) were play-off places, and earned places in the 2016–17 European Rugby Champions Cup. Blue background indicates teams outside the play-off places that earned places in the European Rugby Champions Cup. To facilitate the 2015 Rugby World Cup, there were no play-offs for the 2016–17 European Rugby Champions Cup; the 20th place went to the winner of the 2015–16 European Rugby Challenge Cup if not already qualified. Because Challenge Cup winner Montpellier qualified via the Top 14, its place passed to the top team from that league not already qualified. Plain background indicates teams that earned a place in the 2016–17 European Rugby Challenge Cup.

== Fixtures ==
All times are local.

=== Round 1 ===
4 September 2015
19:30

Connacht (Ireland)	29–23	(Wales) Newport Gwent Dragons (1 BP)
Try: Fox-Matamua 25' m Poolman 49' m Carr 77' c Con: Carty (1/3); Pen: Carty (4/4) 7', 8', 21', 68'	Report	Try: Pretorius 41' c J. Thomas 75' c Con: Tovey (2/2); Pen: Tovey (2/2) 28', 56'; Prydie (1/1) 80'

Galway Sportsgrounds
Attendance: 3,624
Referee: Ben Whitehouse (WRU)

4 September 2015
19:35

Edinburgh (Scotland)	16–9	(Ireland) Leinster (1 BP)
Try: Hoyland (2) 54' m, 78' m Pen: Fowles (1/3) 24'; Cuthbert (1/2) 70'	Report	Pen: Nacewa (3/5) 16', 57', 72'

Meggetland
Attendance: 2,479
Referee: Peter Fitzgibbon (IRFU)

4 September 2015
19:35

(1 BP) Ulster (Ireland)	28–6	(Wales) Ospreys
Try: Herring 5' m McCloskey 26' c Herbst 52' m L. Marshall 78' m Con: McCloskey (1/3); Pen: McCloskey (2/2) 9', 47'	Report	Pen: S. Davies (2/3) 20', 35'

Kingspan Stadium
Attendance: 13,544
Referee: Ian Davies (WRU)

5 September 2015
17:15

(1 BP) Glasgow Warriors (Scotland)	10–16	(Wales) Scarlets
Try: Cusack 45' m G. Bryce 79' m	Report	Try: A. Shingler 4' m Parkes 19' m Pen: D. Jones (2/3) 28', 54'

Scotstoun Stadium
Attendance: 6,562
Referee: Gary Conway (IRFU)

5 September 2015
19:45

Munster (Ireland)	18–13	(Italy) Benetton Treviso (1 BP)
Try: Stander (2) 46' m, 53' c Con: Keatley (1/2); Pen: Keatley (2/3) 6', 25'	Report	Try: Budd 10' c Con: Hayward (1/1); Pen: Hayward (2/3) 71', 80'

Irish Independent Park
Attendance: 5,425
Referee: Lloyd Linton (SRU)

6 September 2015
14:30

(1 BP) Cardiff Blues (Wales)	61–13	(Italy) Zebre
Try: Navidi (2) 20' m, 40' m James 33' m Summerhill (2) 36' m, 60' c Patchell (3) 42' c, 49' m, 52' m Turnbull (3) 71' c, 75' m, 80' m Con: Patchell (1/7); G. Davies (1/1); Fish (1/3)	Report	Try: Beyers 57' c Con: Beyers (1/1); Pen: Azzolini (2/2) 11', 23'

Cardiff Arms Park
Attendance: 3,658
Referee: Andrew Brace (IRFU)

=== Round 2 ===
11 September 2015
19:05

Newport Gwent Dragons (Wales)	13–0	(Italy) Zebre
Try: Jackson 28' c Con: Tovey (1/1); Pen: Tovey (2/2) 11', 25'	Report

Rodney Parade
Attendance: 4,159
Referee: Lloyd Linton (SRU)

11 September 2015
19:35

Glasgow Warriors (Scotland)	33–32	(Ireland) Connacht (2 BP)
Try: G. Bryce 30' c Cummings 35' c Harley 41' c Con: Clegg (3/3); Pen: Clegg (4/4) 10', 22', 27', 68'	Report	Try: Jo. Cooney 46' c penalty try 56' c Poolman 59' m Fox-Matamua 75' c Con: Carty (3/4); Pen: Carty (2/2) 7', 39'

Scotstoun Stadium
Attendance: 6,267
Referee: Ian Davies (WRU)

12 September 2015
15:00

Scarlets (Wales)	22–12	(Ireland) Ulster
Try: Parkes 45' c Con: D. Jones (1/1); Pen: D. Jones (4/5) 2', 18', 24', 62'; Thomas (1/1) 80'	Report	Try: Scholes 54' m penalty try 71' c Con: McCloskey (1/2)

Parc y Scarlets
Attendance: 6,061
Referee: Andrew Brace (IRFU)

12 September 2015
17:10

(1 BP) Benetton Treviso (Italy)	24–27	(Scotland) Edinburgh
Try: Pratichetti 40' c Naude 41' m Con: Hayward (1/2); Pen: Hayward (4/4) 24', 29', 38', 56'	Report	Try: Burleigh 4' c Hoyland 12' c Beard 33' c Con: Tonks (3/3); Pen: Tonks (2/4) 25', 72'

Stadio Comunale di Monigo
Attendance: 4,000
Referee: Gary Conway (IRFU)

12 September 2015
17:15

Leinster (Ireland)	23–15	(Wales) Cardiff Blues
Try: Conan 16' c penalty try 76' c Con: Nacewa (2/2); Pen: Nacewa (3/5) 13', 46', 66'	Report	Pen: Patchell (5/5) 3', 7', 33', 51', 56'

RDS Arena
Attendance: 13,300
Referee: Ben Whitehouse (WRU)

13 September 2015
14:30

(1 BP) Ospreys (Wales)	18–20	(Ireland) Munster
Pen: S. Davies (6/6) 9', 35', 40', 46', 62', 70'	Report	Try: Fitzgerald 52' c Stander 79' c Con: Bleyendaal (1/1); Keatley (1/1); Pen: Bleyendaal (2/2) 12', 31'

Liberty Stadium
Attendance: 8,107
Referee: Dudley Phillips (IRFU)

=== Round 3 ===
2 October 2015
18:00

Edinburgh (Scotland)	20–9	(Wales) Ospreys
Try: Burleigh 37' c Andress 73' c Con: Tonks (1/1); Cuthbert (1/1); Pen: Tonks (2/2) 47', 63'	Report	Pen: S. Davies (3/5) 4', 17', 40'

Murrayfield Stadium
Attendance: 2,475
Referee: Andrew Brace (IRFU)

2 October 2015
18:00

Munster (Ireland)	23–21	(Scotland) Glasgow Warriors (1 BP)
Try: O'Callaghan 28' c Botha 66' c Con: Keatley (2/2); Pen: Keatley (3/4) 19', 40', 77'	Report	Pen: Clegg (6/7) 12', 32', 38', 51', 55', 60'; Drop: Clegg (1/1) 74'

Thomond Park
Attendance: 11,713
Referee: Ben Whitehouse (WRU)

2 October 2015
18:05

(1 BP) Ulster (Ireland)	48–7	(Italy) Benetton Treviso
Try: Tuohy 6' c Reidy 21' c P. Marshall 33' m Gilroy (2) 39' m, 62' c Browne 55' c Stevenson 76' c Con: McCloskey (3/5); Nelson (2/2); Pen: McCloskey (1/2) 11'	Report	Try: Christie 46' c Con: Hayward (1/1)

Kingspan Stadium
Attendance: 14,398
Referee: Lloyd Linton (SRU)

3 October 2015
14:30

(1 BP) Leinster (Ireland)	37–13	(Wales) Newport Gwent Dragons
Try: Nacewa (2) 26' c, 35' c Ringrose 64' c Marsh 67' c Con: McFadden (3/3); Nacewa (1/1); Pen: McFadden (3/3) 12', 16', 53'	Report	Try: Pretorius 22' c Con: Tovey (1/1); Pen: Tovey (2/2) 15', 56'

RDS Arena
Attendance: 10,400
Referee: Ian Davies (WRU)

3 October 2015
17:00

(1 BP) Connacht (Ireland)	36–31	(Wales) Cardiff Blues (2 BP)
Try: Marmion 10' c Fox-Matamua 22' c Poolman 26' m O'Halloran 57' c Muldowney 64' c Con: Carty (4/5); Pen: Carty (1/2) 79'	Report	Try: Summerhill 7' c Turnbull 33' c Fish 48' c Hobbs 80' c Con: Patchell (3/3); G. Davies (1/1); Pen: Patchell (1/2) 40'

Galway Sportsgrounds
Attendance: 3,274
Referee: Neil Hennessy (WRU)

4 October 2015
14:00

Zebre (Italy)	8–20	(Wales) Scarlets
Try: Bellini 28' m Pen: Padovani (1/4) 10'	Report	Try: J. Davies 43' m Pen: D. Jones (3/3) 26', 33', 47'; S. Shingler (2/3) 64', 67'

Stadio Sergio Lanfranchi
Attendance: 2,000
Referee: Dudley Phillips (IRFU)

=== Round 4 ===
16 October 2015
19:30

(1 BP) Connacht (Ireland)	34–15	(Italy) Zebre
Try: Healy 7' c Marmion 21' c E. McKeon 27' m Ronaldson 39' c Buckley 48' m Con: Ronaldson (3/5); Pen: Ronaldson (1/1) 3'	Report	Try: Berryman 35' c Meyer 78' m Con: Padovani (1/1); Pen: Padovani (1/1) 10'

Galway Sportsgrounds
Attendance: 3,994
Referee: Ben Whitehouse (WRU)

16 October 2015
19:35

(1 BP) Glasgow Warriors (Scotland)	29–15	(Wales) Newport Gwent Dragons
Try: Fusaro 35' c Fagerson 54' c Bulumakau 69' m Favaro 79' c Con: Clegg (3/4); Pen: Clegg (1/2) 12'	Report	Try: Landman 23' c Hewitt 72' m Con: Tovey (1/2); Pen: Tovey (1/2) 40'

Scotstoun Stadium
Attendance: 6,641
Referee: Gary Conway (IRFU)

16 October 2015
19:35

Scarlets (Wales)	25–14	(Ireland) Leinster
Try: J. Davies 8' m Van der Merwe (2) 32' c, 52' c Con: S. Shingler (2/3); Pen: S. Shingler (2/2) 3', 61'	Report	Try: Nacewa 62' c Tracy 78' c Con: McFadden (2/2)

Parc y Scarlets
Attendance: 7,013
Referee: Peter Fitzgibbon (IRFU)

16 October 2015
19:45

Edinburgh (Scotland)	16–10	(Ireland) Ulster (1 BP)
Try: Watson 54' c Con: Tonks (1/1); Pen: Tonks (3/4) 5', 17', 65'	Report	Try: Reidy 44' c Con: Nelson (1/1); Pen: Nelson (1/1) 24'

Murrayfield Stadium
Attendance: 4,324
Referee: Dudley Phillips (IRFU)

17 October 2015
13:30

(1 BP) Munster (Ireland)	35–27	(Wales) Cardiff Blues
Try: Sherry (2) 27' c, 52' c Keatley 36' c Coghlan 61' c Conway 72' c Con: Keatley (5/5)	Report	Try: Knoyle 23' c R. Smith 40' c Isaacs 42' c Con: Patchell (3/3); Pen: Patchell (2/5) 15', 69'

Musgrave Park
Attendance: 6,124
Referee: Ian Davies (WRU)

17 October 2015
14:30

(1 BP) Benetton Treviso (Italy)	22–25	(Wales) Ospreys
Try: Ambrosini 23' m Hayward 73' c Bigi 80' c Con: Hayward (2/3); Pen: Hayward (1/3) 2'	Report	Try: D. Evans 18' m John 29' c S. Davies 63' c Con: S. Davies (2/3); Pen: S. Davies (2/5) 53', 76'

Stadio Comunale di Monigo
Attendance: 3,700
Referee: Neil Hennessy (WRU)

=== Round 5 ===
23 October 2015
19:05

Scarlets (Wales)	25–22	(Ireland) Munster (1 BP)
Try: Van der Merwe 41' m T. Williams 53' m Pen: S. Shingler (5/6) 27', 40', 60', 77', 80'	Report	Try: Conway 25' c Con: Keatley (1/1); Pen: Keatley (4/6) 5', 29', 48', 72'; Drop: Keatley (1/2) 58'

Parc y Scarlets
Attendance: 6,466
Referee: Gary Conway (IRFU)

23 October 2015
19:15

Newport Gwent Dragons (Wales)	19–12	(Italy) Benetton Treviso (1 BP)
Try: Cudd 23' c Con: Tovey (1/1); Pen: Tovey (4/4) 2', 28', 44', 59'	Report	Pen: Hayward (4/5) 12', 32', 41', 47'

Rodney Parade
Attendance: 4,940
Referee: Dudley Phillips (IRFU)

23 October 2015
19:35

(1 BP) Ulster (Ireland)	24–17	(Wales) Cardiff Blues (1 BP)
Try: Trimble 18' m P. Marshall 40' c Williams 45' c McCloskey 49' m Con: Humphreys (2/4)	Report	Try: Navidi 56' m Pen: Patchell (4/4) 3', 22', 36', 72'

Kingspan Stadium
Attendance: 15,886
Referee: Ben Whitehouse (WRU)

23 October 2015
19:45

Leinster (Ireland)	23–18	(Scotland) Glasgow Warriors (1 BP)
Try: L. McGrath 42' c penalty try 64' c Con: McFadden (2/2); Pen: McFadden (3/4) 16', 21', 80'	Report	Try: Fagerson 13' c Naiyaravoro 48' m Con: Weir (1/2); Pen: Weir (2/3) 26', 34'

RDS Arena
Attendance: 11,089
Referee: Ian Davies (WRU)

24 October 2015
13:30

(1 BP) Ospreys (Wales)	16–21	(Ireland) Connacht
Try: Baker 14' m Tipuric 68' m Pen: S. Davies (2/5) 2', 56'	Report	Try: Healy 27' m Aki 43' c Con: Ronaldson (1/1); Pen: Carty (2/4) 10', 19'; Ronaldson (1/1) 77'

Liberty Stadium
Attendance: 7,893
Referee: Andrew Brace (IRFU)

24 October 2015
14:30

Zebre (Italy)	19–11	(Scotland) Edinburgh
Try: Berryman 54' c Con: Canna (1/1); Pen: Canna (4/5) 10', 19', 26', 59'	Report	Try: Watson 37' m Pen: Fowles (2/3) 8', 33'

Stadio Sergio Lanfranchi
Attendance: 1,500
Referee: Peter Fitzgibbon (IRFU)

=== Round 6 ===
30 October 2015
18:00

(1 BP) Munster (Ireland)	32–28	(Ireland) Ulster (2 BP)
Try: Conway 16' c Copeland 29' c Van den Heever 33' m Hurley 60' m Zebo 65' m Con: Keatley (2/5); Pen: Keatley (1/1) 49'	Report	Try: Gilroy (2) 2' m, 26' m Williams 38' m Tuohy 67' c Con: Pad. Jackson (1/4); Pen: Pad. Jackson (1/1) 20'; Drop: Pad. Jackson (1/1) 45'

Thomond Park
Attendance: 13,039
Referee: Marius Mitrea (FIR)

30 October 2015
18:00

(1 BP) Scarlets (Wales)	25–15	(Wales) Newport Gwent Dragons
Try: J. Davies (2) 9' c, 65' m John (2) 18' m, 58' m Con: Thomas (1/4); Pen: Thomas (1/1) 48'	Report	Try: Tovey 36' m Pretorius 71' c Con: Tovey (1/2); Pen: Tovey (1/3) 24'

Parc y Scarlets
Attendance: 6,952
Referee: Ben Whitehouse (WRU)

31 October 2015
14:00

(1 BP) Zebre (Italy)	26–15	(Wales) Cardiff Blues
Try: Van Zyl 3' m Van Schalkwyk (2) 15' c, 75' c Meyer 28' c Con: Canna (3/4)	Report	Try: Thomas 7' m James 57' c Con: Patchell (1/2); Pen: Patchell (1/2) 33'

Stadio Sergio Lanfranchi
Attendance: 1,634
Referee: David Wilkinson (IRFU)

31 October 2015
18:45

Connacht (Ireland)	14–9	(Scotland) Edinburgh (1 BP)
Try: O'Halloran 9' m Pen: Carty (3/5) 7', 44', 55'	Report	Pen: Hidalgo-Clyne (2/2) 15', 53'; Kinghorn (1/1) 37'

Galway Sportsgrounds
Attendance: 3,834
Referee: Leighton Hodges (WRU)

1 November 2015
14:30

(1 BP) Glasgow Warriors (Scotland)	31–19	(Wales) Ospreys
Try: Lamont 29' m Peterson 50' c Allan 63' m Naiyaravoro 80' m Con: Weir (1/4); Pen: Weir (3/4) 2', 43', 55'	Report	Try: Baker 73' c Con: Biggar (1/1); Pen: Biggar (4/5) 6', 13', 37', 46'

Scotstoun Stadium
Attendance: 6,650
Referee: Peter Fitzgibbon (IRFU)

1 November 2015
16:00

Benetton Treviso (Italy)	3–27	(Ireland) Leinster (1 BP)
Pen: Hayward (1/1) 7'	Report	Try: J. McGrath 3' c Nacewa 40' m Conan 56' m Te'o 61' c Con: Sexton (1/1); McFadden (1/3); Pen: McFadden (1/1) 33'

Stadio Comunale di Monigo
Attendance: 4,000
Referee: Andrew Brace (IRFU)

=== Round 7 ===
6 November 2015
19:30

Connacht (Ireland)	33–19	(Italy) Benetton Treviso
Try: Henshaw 42' c McCartney 52' c Healy 75' c Con: Ronaldson (3/3); Pen: Ronaldson (4/5) 3', 20', 36', 72'	Report	Try: Hayward (2) 26' m, 47' c Gori 80' c Con: Hayward (2/3)

Galway Sportsgrounds
Attendance: 3,443
Referee: Ian Davies (WRU)

6 November 2015
19:35

Leinster (Ireland)	19–15	(Wales) Scarlets (1 BP)
Try: Ross 44' c Con: Madigan (1/1); Pen: Madigan (4/4) 10', 19', 28', 59'	Report	Try: Parkes 3' c G. Owen 24' m Con: D. Jones (1/2); Pen: D. Jones (1/1) 33'

RDS Arena
Attendance: 14,743
Referee: Leighton Hodges (WRU)

7 November 2015
14:30

(1 BP) Ospreys (Wales)	36–3	(Italy) Zebre
Try: Spratt 8' m Jos. Matavesi 16' c Walker (2) 24' m, 62' c Tipuric 55' m Parry 71' c Con: Biggar (2/5); S. Davies (1/1)	Report	Pen: Canna (1/2) 30'

Liberty Stadium
Attendance: 7,236
Referee: Gary Conway (IRFU)

7 November 2015
15:00

(1 BP) Cardiff Blues (Wales)	30–35	(Scotland) Glasgow Warriors (1 BP)
Try: G. Evans 30' m penalty try 78' c Con: J. Evans (1/1); Pen: Patchell (6/6) 7', 12', 19', 37', 58', 63'	Report	Try: Nakarawa 25' m Naiyaravoro 38' c Grant 68' c Gray 73' c Con: Russell (3/4); Pen: Russell (3/3) 5', 41', 75'

Cardiff Arms Park
Attendance: 5,704
Referee: Marius Mitrea (FIR)

7 November 2015
17:15

(1 BP) Edinburgh (Scotland)	14–16	(Ireland) Munster
Try: Helu 46' m Pen: Hidalgo-Clyne (3/3) 10', 39', 56'	Report	Try: J. Ryan 7' c Con: Keatley (1/1); Pen: Keatley (3/4) 29', 61', 67'

Murrayfield Stadium
Attendance: 4,981
Referee: David Wilkinson (IRFU)

8 November 2015
14:30

(1 BP) Newport Gwent Dragons (Wales)	12–19	(Ireland) Ulster
Pen: D. Jones (3/3) 10', 16', 19'; Tovey (1/1) 62'	Report	Try: P. Marshall 50' c Con: Pad. Jackson (1/1); Pen: Pad. Jackson (4/5) 25', 34', 69', 71'

Rodney Parade
Attendance: 4,483
Referee: Dudley Phillips (IRFU)

=== Round 8 ===
27 November 2015
19:35

(1 BP) Edinburgh (Scotland)	32–13	(Wales) Newport Gwent Dragons
Try: Nel 18' c Dickinson 59' c Brown 72' m Scott 76' c Con: Hidalgo-Clyne (2/3); Kinghorn (1/1); Pen: Hidalgo-Clyne (2/2) 6', 27'	Report	Try: Cudd 80' c Con: D. Jones (1/1); Pen: D. Jones (2/2) 15', 34'

Murrayfield Stadium
Attendance: 3,294
Referee: Marius Mitrea (FIR)

27 November 2015
19:35

Glasgow Warriors (Scotland)	13–6	(Italy) Benetton Treviso (1 BP)
Try: Ashe 72' c Con: Weir (1/1); Pen: Russell (1/1) 3'; Weir (1/1) 78'	Report	Pen: Hayward (2/4) 9', 32'

Scotstoun Stadium
Attendance: 6,634
Referee: David Wilkinson (IRFU)

27 November 2015
19:35

Leinster (Ireland)	8–3	(Ireland) Ulster (1 BP)
Try: Cronin 36' m Pen: Sexton (1/1) 5'	Report	Pen: Pad. Jackson (1/2) 13'

RDS Arena
Attendance: 15,552
Referee: John Lacey (IRFU)

28 November 2015
15:00

Ospreys (Wales)	13–6	(Wales) Cardiff Blues (1 BP)
Try: A. Jones 57' c Con: S. Davies (1/1); Pen: S. Davies (2/4) 69', 77'	Report	Pen: J. Evans (2/3) 6', 50'

Liberty Stadium
Attendance: 9,920
Referee: Nigel Owens (WRU)

28 November 2015
17:15

(1 BP) Munster (Ireland)	12–18	(Ireland) Connacht
Try: N. Scannell 20' m penalty try 65' c Con: Keatley (1/2)	Report	Try: O'Halloran 17' c Aki 77' m Con: Ronaldson (1/2); Pen: Ronaldson (2/3) 11', 58'

Thomond Park
Attendance: 15,143
Referee: Ben Whitehouse (WRU)

29 November 2015
14:30

Scarlets (Wales)	20–12	(Italy) Zebre
Try: Parkes 7' c A. Davies 11' c Con: Thomas (2/2); Pen: Thomas (1/1) 21'; S. Shingler (1/3) 76'	Report	Try: Van Schalkwyk (2) 49' m, 59' c Con: Canna (1/2)

Parc y Scarlets
Attendance: 5,504
Referee: George Clancy (IRFU)

=== Round 9 ===
4 December 2015
19:05

Cardiff Blues (Wales)	20–16	(Ireland) Connacht (1 BP)
Try: Vosawai 5' c James 54' c Con: Patchell (2/2); Pen: Patchell (2/3) 25', 63'	Report	Try: Porter 12' m E. McKeon 21' m Pen: Porter (1/1) 26'; Carty (1/1) 66'

Cardiff Arms Park
Attendance: 5,824
Referee: Andrew Brace (IRFU)

4 December 2015
19:35

Ulster (Ireland)	14–7	(Scotland) Edinburgh (1 BP)
Try: penalty try 4' c Scholes 10' c Con: Pad. Jackson (2/2)	Report	Try: Du Preez 47' c Con: Cuthbert (1/1)

Kingspan Stadium
Attendance: 12,640
Referee: Ian Davies (WRU)

5 December 2015
15:00

(1 BP) Benetton Treviso (Italy)	20–22	(Wales) Scarlets
Try: Christie (2) 5' c, 72' m Gori 58' m Con: Hayward (1/3); Pen: Hayward (1/2) 34'	Report	Try: Allen (2) 10' c, 51' c Van der Merwe 26' m Con: Thomas (2/3); Pen: S. Shingler (1/1) 76'

Stadio Comunale di Monigo
Attendance: 4,500
Referee: Dudley Phillips (IRFU)

5 December 2015
15:00

Glasgow Warriors (Scotland)	P–P	(Ireland) Leinster
	Postponed due to a waterlogged pitch.

Scotstoun Stadium
Referee: Nigel Owens (WRU)

6 December 2015
15:00

Zebre (Italy)	22–39	(Wales) Ospreys (1 BP)
Try: Van Zyl (2) 4' c, 74' c Violi 40' m Con: Violi (1/1); Padovani (1/1); Pen: Canna (1/2) 44'	Report	Try: Hassler 13' c Walker 34' m Tipuric (2) 36' c, 56' c Spratt 60' c Con: S. Davies (4/5); Pen: S. Davies (2/2) 29', 46'

Stadio Sergio Lanfranchi
Attendance: 2,308
Referee: John Lacey (IRFU)

6 December 2015
14:30

Newport Gwent Dragons (Wales)	22–6	(Ireland) Munster
Try: Landman 77' c Con: D. Jones (1/1); Pen: D. Jones (3/4) 1', 30', 64'; Tovey (1/1) 80'; Drop: D. Jones (1/3) 43'	Report	Pen: R. Scannell (2/2) 13', 38'

Rodney Parade
Attendance: 5,571
Referee: Gary Conway (IRFU)

=== Round 10 ===
26 December 2015
14:05

(1 BP) Scarlets (Wales)	26–27	(Wales) Ospreys
Try: Barclay 10' c A. Davies 34' c Con: Thomas (2/2); Pen: Thomas (4/4) 17', 23', 42', 51'	Report	Try: Dirksen 27' c A. Jones 40' c Walker 57' c Con: Biggar (3/3); Pen: Biggar (2/3) 13', 21'

Parc y Scarlets
Attendance: 14,568
Referee: Nigel Owens (WRU)

26 December 2015
18:00

(1 BP) Connacht (Ireland)	3–10	(Ireland) Ulster
Pen: MacGinty (1/1) 63'	Report	Try: Williams 76' c Con: Pad. Jackson (1/1); Pen: Pad. Jackson (1/1) 32'

Galway Sportsgrounds
Attendance: 5,876
Referee: Peter Fitzgibbon (IRFU)

27 December 2015
15:00

Zebre (Italy)	28–25	(Italy) Benetton Treviso (1 BP)
Try: Canna 20' c Biagi 68' m Van Schalkwyk 80' c Con: Canna (1/1); Haimona (1/2); Pen: Canna (3/3) 13', 17', 34'	Report	Try: Hayward 58' m Gega 66' c Zanusso 75' c Con: Hayward (2/3); Pen: Hayward (2/2) 15', 53'

Stadio Sergio Lanfranchi
Attendance: 4,509
Referee: Ben Whitehouse (WRU)

27 December 2015
15:05

(1 BP) Newport Gwent Dragons (Wales)	20–21	(Wales) Cardiff Blues
Try: Hewitt 9' m Pen: D. Jones (3/3) 39', 42', 60'; Tovey (1/1) 71'; Drop: D. Jones (1/2) 6'	Report	Try: penalty try 65' c James 73' m Con: Patchell (1/2); Pen: Patchell (3/3) 13', 22', 79'

Rodney Parade
Attendance: 8,226
Referee: Ian Davies (WRU)

27 December 2015
17:15

Munster (Ireland)	7–24	(Ireland) Leinster
Try: Copeland 37' c Con: R. Scannell (1/1)	Report	Try: Nacewa 3' c J. McGrath 54' c Kirchner 80' c Con: Madigan (3/3); Pen: Madigan (1/1) 14'

Thomond Park
Attendance: 25,600
Referee: David Wilkinson (IRFU)

==== 1872 Cup 1st round ====
27 December 2015
15:05

Edinburgh (Scotland)	23–11	(Scotland) Glasgow Warriors
Try: Scott 12' c Hardie 69' c Con: Hidalgo-Clyne (2/2); Pen: Hidalgo-Clyne (3/4) 30', 50', 59'	Report	Try: Bennett 6' m Pen: Russell (2/2) 47', 56'

Murrayfield Stadium
Attendance: 23,642
Referee: John Lacey (IRFU)

=== Round 11 ===
1 January 2016
14:00

Ospreys (Wales)	12–7	(Wales) Newport Gwent Dragons (1 BP)
Try: D. Evans 23' m Dirksen 34' c Con: S. Davies (1/2)	Report	Try: Jackson 65' c Con: Tovey (1/1)

Liberty Stadium
Attendance: 9,247
Referee: Andrew Brace (IRFU)

1 January 2016
17:00

(1 BP) Cardiff Blues (Wales)	29–27	(Wales) Scarlets (1 BP)
Try: Allen 15' c Fish 49' m Dacey 57' c Cuthbert 76' c Con: Patchell (3/4); Pen: Patchell (1/1) 2'	Report	Try: Owens 6' c Van der Merwe 11' c G. Davies 65' c Con: Thomas (3/3); Pen: Thomas (2/2) 17', 27

Cardiff Arms Park
Attendance: 11,720
Referee: Ben Whitehouse (WRU)

1 January 2016
17:00

Leinster (Ireland)	13–0	(Ireland) Connacht
Try: Van der Flier 60' c Con: Sexton (1/1); Pen: Sexton (1/1) 14'; Madigan (1/1) 74'	Report

RDS Arena
Attendance: 14,297
Referee: George Clancy (IRFU)

2 January 2016
15:00

(1 BP) Ulster (Ireland)	7–9	(Ireland) Munster
Try: Ludik 23' c Con: Pad. Jackson (1/1)	Report	Pen: Keatley (2/2) 8', 60'; Drop: Keatley (1/1) 57'

Kingspan Stadium
Attendance: 17,211
Referee: Gary Conway (IRFU)

3 January 2016
14:30

Benetton Treviso (Italy)	8–18	(Italy) Zebre
Try: Smylie 73' m Pen: Hayward (1/2) 12'	Report	Try: Burgess 33' m Toniolatti 75' c Con: Padovani (1/1); Pen: Canna (1/1) 4'; Padovani (1/1) 55'

Stadio Comunale di Monigo
Attendance: 5,000
Referee: Nigel Owens (WRU)

==== 1872 Cup 2nd round ====
2 January 2016
17:15

(1 BP) Glasgow Warriors (Scotland)	11–14	(Scotland) Edinburgh
Try: Bennett 31' m Pen: Weir (2/2) 5', 54'	Report	Try: Burleigh 74' m Pen: Hidalgo-Clyne (3/4) 16', 25', 67'

Murrayfield Stadium
Attendance: 8,000
Referee: Peter Fitzgibbon (IRFU)

=== Round 12 ===
8 January 2016
19:30

Edinburgh (Scotland)	28–13	(Italy) Benetton Treviso
Try: Hoyland (2) 12' c, 80' m penalty try 58' c Con: Hidalgo-Clyne (2/2); Pen: Hidalgo-Clyne (3/3) 7', 46', 50'	Report	Try: McLean 64' c Con: Ambrosini (1/1); Pen: Ambrosini (2/2) 17', 24'

Murrayfield Stadium
Attendance: 3,159
Referee: Gary Conway (IRFU)

8 January 2016
19:35

Ulster (Ireland)	P–P (Note: Due to the terrorist attacks that took place in Paris on 13 November 2015, matches in the European Rugby Champions Cup and European Rugby Challenge Cup were postponed to a later date – later announced to take place on the weekend of 8–10 January 2016. This meant the fixtures that featured those teams in their respective domestic leagues, were postponed to a later date.)	(Wales) Newport Gwent Dragons

Kingspan Stadium

8 January 2016
19:45

Ospreys (Wales)	9–22	(Ireland) Leinster
Pen: Biggar (2/4) 24', 55'; Drop: Biggar (1/2) 14'	Report	Try: D. Kearney (2) 17' c, 76' c Reid 65' m Con: Sexton (2/3); Pen: Sexton (1/1) 27'

Liberty Stadium
Attendance: 7,340
Referee: David Wilkinson (IRFU)

9 January 2016
14:30

Zebre (Italy)	P–P	(Scotland) Glasgow Warriors

Stadio Sergio Lanfranchi

9 January 2016
17:15

Cardiff Blues (Wales)	P–P	(Ireland) Munster

Cardiff Arms Park

10 January 2016
14:30

Scarlets (Wales)	21–19	(Ireland) Connacht (1 BP)
Try: S. Evans 45' c Collins 60' m Con: Thomas (1/2); Pen: Thomas (2/2) 36', 43'; S. Shingler (1/1) 78'	Report	Try: Healy 25' c Con: Ronaldson (1/1); Pen: Ronaldson (2/2) 23', 48'; Carty (2/2) 67', 77'

Parc y Scarlets
Attendance: 5,888
Referee: Marius Mitrea (FIR)

=== Round 13 ===
29 January 2016
19:05

Newport Gwent Dragons (Wales)	23–13	(Ireland) Leinster
Try: Hewitt 3' c Tovey 32' c Con: Tovey (2/2); Pen: Tovey (2/2) 69', 79'; Drop: Tovey (1/1) 36'	Report	Try: L. McGrath 14' c Con: McFadden (1/1); Pen: McFadden (2/2) 10', 45'

Rodney Parade
Attendance: 4,303
Referee: Marius Mitrea (FIR)

30 January 2016
15:00

(1 BP) Zebre (Italy)	12–16	(Ireland) Munster
Pen: Haimona (4/5) 12', 15', 19', 29'	Report	Try: Chisholm 5' c Con: Keatley (1/1); Pen: Keatley (2/4) 21', 36'; Drop: Keatley (1/1) 71'

Stadio Sergio Lanfranchi
Attendance: 2,400
Referee: Dudley Phillips (IRFU)

30 January 2016
15:00

(1 BP) Connacht (Ireland)	30–17	(Wales) Scarlets
Try: Heenan (2) 21' m, 36' m Buckley 51' c Ah You 63' c Con: Carty (2/4); Pen: Carty (2/3) 8', 47'	Report	Try: Van der Merwe 44' c G. Owen 73' c Con: Thomas (2/2); Pen: Thomas (1/1) 43'

Galway Sportsgrounds
Attendance: 5,292
Referee: Ben Whitehouse (WRU)

30 January 2016
18:00

Benetton Treviso (Italy)	13–32	(Ireland) Ulster (1 BP)
Try: Steyn 77' c Con: Hayward (1/1); Pen: Hayward (2/2) 32', 48'	Report	Try: Reidy 52' c Cave 57' c Scholes 62' c Olding 71' m Con: Humphreys (2/2); Olding (1/2); Pen: Humphreys (2/2) 10', 38'

Stadio Comunale di Monigo
Attendance: 2,500
Referee: Ian Davies (WRU)

30 January 2016
17:15

Cardiff Blues (Wales)	10–3	(Scotland) Edinburgh (1 BP)
Try: Fish 1' c Con: Patchell (1/1); Pen: Patchell (1/3) 15'	Report	Pen: Fowles (1/1) 21'

Cardiff Arms Park
Attendance: 6,058
Referee: David Wilkinson (IRFU)

31 January 2016
14:30

Ospreys (Wales)	20–20	(Scotland) Glasgow Warriors
Try: Walker 23' c D. Evans 68' c Con: S. Davies (2/2); Pen: S. Davies (2/4) 19', 43'	Report	Try: Hughes 26' c Reid 53' c Con: Weir (2/2); Pen: Weir (2/4) 3', 7'

Liberty Stadium
Attendance: 7,239
Referee: Peter Fitzgibbon (IRFU)

=== Round 12 rescheduled match ===
5 February 2016
19:35

Ulster (Ireland)	17–15	(Wales) Newport Gwent Dragons (1 BP)
Try: Reidy 24' c penalty try 52' c Con: Humphreys (1/1); Pad. Jackson (1/1); Pen: Pad. Jackson (1/2) 77'	Report	Try: Hughes 16' c Meyer 46' m Con: O'Brien (1/2); Pen: O'Brien (1/1) 4'

Kingspan Stadium
Attendance: 13,768
Referee: Nigel Owens (WRU)

This match – originally scheduled to be held during Round 12, on 8 January 2016 – was postponed due to a European Rugby Champions Cup fixture rearrangement that occurred as a result of the Paris terrorist attacks in November 2015.

=== Round 14 ===
11 February 2016
19:30

(1 BP) Newport Gwent Dragons (Wales)	21–26	(Ireland) Connacht (1 BP)
Try: Hughes 15' m Hewitt 26' c Con: O'Brien (1/1); Pen: Tovey (1/1) 9'; O'Brien (2/2) 44', 56'	Report	Try: Healy 13' c O'Halloran 21' c Masterson 65' m Aki 68' c Con: Ronaldson (3/4)

Rodney Parade
Attendance: 4,128
Referee: David Wilkinson (IRFU)

12 February 2016
19:30

(1 BP) Leinster (Ireland)	52–0	(Italy) Zebre
Try: Triggs 9' c Nacewa 18' c L. McGrath 36' c A. Byrne 38' m Murphy 59' m Cronin 69' c Ringrose 72' c Kelleher 76' c Con: Nacewa (3/4); Marsh (3/4)	Report

RDS Arena
Attendance: 8,612
Referee: Ben Whitehouse (WRU)

12 February 2016
19:30

Ulster (Ireland)	13–10	(Scotland) Glasgow Warriors (1 BP)
Try: Black 52' c Con: Pad. Jackson (1/1); Pen: Pienaar (1/2) 22'; Pad. Jackson (1/1) 66'	Report	Try: Jones 9' m Naiyaravoro 80' m

Kingspan Stadium
Attendance: 16,477
Referee: Marius Mitrea (FIR)

12 February 2016
20:15

Scarlets (Wales)	22–21	(Scotland) Edinburgh (1 BP)
Try: Allen 5' c Con: S. Shingler (1/1); Pen: S. Shingler (1/1) 17'; A. Thomas (4/4) 23', 46', 53', 76'	Report	Try: Du Preez 57' m A. Toolis 73' c Con: Tonks (1/2); Pen: Fowles (2/3) 20', 42'; Tonks (1/1) 66'

Parc y Scarlets
Attendance: 5,569
Referee: Andrew Brace (IRFU)

13 February 2016
13:30

Benetton Treviso (Italy)	13–7	(Wales) Cardiff Blues (1 BP)
Try: penalty try 47' c Con: Hayward (1/1); Pen: Hayward (2/2) 8', 22'	Report	Try: Scully 34' c Con: Patchell (1/1)

Stadio Comunale di Monigo
Attendance: 2,500
Referee: Dudley Phillips (IRFU)

14 February 2016
17:00

(1 BP) Munster (Ireland)	17–21	(Wales) Ospreys
Try: Williams 11' c Saili 26' m Copeland 50' m Con: Keatley (1/3)	Report	Try: S. Davies 24' c Watkin 59' m Con: S. Davies (1/2); Pen: S. Davies (3/4) 37', 55', 77'

Irish Independent Park
Attendance: 7,791
Referee: Leighton Hodges (WRU)

=== Round 15 ===
19 February 2016
19:10

Benetton Treviso (Italy)	19–17	(Wales) Newport Gwent Dragons (1 BP)
Try: Esposito 2' c Paulo 40' c Nitoglia 45' m Con: Hayward (2/3)	Report	Try: Amos 9' c Hill 60' c Con: O'Brien (2/2); Pen: O'Brien (1/1) 35'

Stadio Comunale di Monigo
Attendance: 1,900
Referee: Andrew Brace (IRFU)

19 February 2016
19:05

Ospreys (Wales)	27–13	(Scotland) Edinburgh
Try: Underhill 34' c Otten 76' m Con: S. Davies (1/2); Pen: S. Davies (5/5) 13', 24', 45', 62', 71'	Report	Try: Dell 25' c Con: Tonks (1/1); Pen: Tonks (2/4) 11', 17'

Liberty Stadium
Attendance: 7,264
Referee: Marius Mitrea (FIR)

19 February 2016
19:35

(1 BP) Glasgow Warriors (Scotland)	27–24	(Ireland) Munster (1 BP)
Try: Puafisi (2) 4' c, 7' c Weir 43' m G. Bryce 70' m Con: Weir (2/4); Pen: Weir (1/3) 62'	Report	Try: Kilcoyne (2) 11' c, 23' c Sherry 63' c Con: Keatley (3/3); Pen: Keatley (1/1) 17'

Rugby Park
Attendance: 7,212
Referee: Ben Whitehouse (WRU)

20 February 2016
15:00

(1 BP) Cardiff Blues (Wales)	13–14	(Ireland) Leinster
Try: Navidi 75' c Con: Patchell (1/1); Pen: Anscombe (2/3) 3', 43'	Report	Try: Nacewa 57' m Pen: Madigan (3/4) 6', 40', 49'

Cardiff Arms Park
Attendance: 5,321
Referee: Peter Fitzgibbon (IRFU)

20 February 2016
17:30

(1 BP) Zebre (Italy)	34–51	(Ireland) Connacht (1 BP)
Try: Meyer 37' c Haimona 45' c Van Schalkwyk 53' c Ruzza 69' c Con: Haimona (4/4); Pen: Haimona (2/2) 13', 19'	Report	Try: Healy (3) 16' c, 43' c, 47' c Marmion 21' c Adeolokun (2) 57' c, 66' c Con: Ronaldson (3/3); MacGinty (3/3); Pen: Ronaldson (1/2) 4'; MacGinty (2/2) 64', 72'

Stadio Sergio Lanfranchi
Attendance: 1,850
Referee: Gary Conway (IRFU)

21 February 2016
14:30

(1 BP) Ulster (Ireland)	20–21	(Wales) Scarlets
Try: Gilroy 20' c L. Marshall 36' c Con: Pad. Jackson (2/2); Pen: Pad. Jackson (1/1) 63'; Drop: Pad. Jackson (1/1) 16'	Report	Try: Collins (2) 4' m, 23' c Con: Thomas (1/2); Pen: Thomas (3/4) 14', 46', 49'

Kingspan Stadium
Attendance: 15,201
Referee: Ian Davies (WRU)

=== Round 16 ===
25 February 2016
19:05

(1 BP) Newport Gwent Dragons (Wales)	15–18	(Scotland) Glasgow Warriors
Pen: O'Brien (5/6) 3', 13', 16', 27', 48'	Report	Try: Dunbar 42' c Weir 72' m Con: Weir (1/2); Pen: Weir (2/3) 10', 25'

Rodney Parade
Attendance: 4,526
Referee: Gary Conway (IRFU)

27 February 2016
19:35

Connacht (Ireland)	30–22	(Wales) Ospreys
Try: Aki 1' c MacGinty 11' c Healy 51' c Con: Ronaldson (3/3); Pen: Ronaldson (3/4) 28', 58', 67'	Report	Try: John 13' m Baker 25' c Webb 55' c Con: S. Davies (2/3); Pen: S. Davies (1/1) 4'

Galway Sportsgrounds
Attendance: 5,279
Referee: George Clancy (IRFU)

28 February 2016
15:00

(1 BP) Benetton Treviso (Italy)	13–16	(Ireland) Munster
Try: Barbieri 25' c Con: Hayward (1/1); Pen: Hayward (2/2) 52', 64'	Report	Try: Van den Heever 11' m Saili 57' m Pen: Keatley (2/2) 68', 75'

Stadio Comunale di Monigo
Attendance: 1,000
Referee: Ian Davies (WRU)

28 February 2016
14:05

Edinburgh (Scotland)	24–23	(Wales) Scarlets (1 BP)
Try: Burleigh 11' c B. Toolis 68' m Con: Kinghorn (1/2); Pen: Kinghorn (4/4) 5', 22', 40', 42'	Report	Try: Parkes 15' m J. Davies 26' m S. Evans 35' c Con: Thomas (1/3); Pen: Thomas (2/4) 7', 14'

Murrayfield Stadium
Attendance: 3,618
Referee: Dudley Phillips (IRFU)

28 February 2016
14:30

Cardiff Blues (Wales)	23–13	(Ireland) Ulster
Try: Patchell 72' c Summerhill 77' c Con: Patchell (2/2); Pen: Patchell (3/5) 40', 42', 65'	Report	Try: Gilroy 45' c Con: Pad. Jackson (1/1); Pen: Pad. Jackson (2/4) 31', 36'

Cardiff Arms Park
Attendance: 5,279
Referee: John Lacey (IRFU)

28 February 2016
16:00

Zebre (Italy)	10–27	(Ireland) Leinster (1 BP)
Try: Ruzza 72' c Con: McKinley (1/1); Pen: McKinley (1/1) 28'	Report	Try: L. McGrath 5' m D. Ryan 17' c A. Byrne 51' c Leavy 78' m Con: Nacewa (2/4); Pen: Nacewa (1/1) 46'

Stadio Sergio Lanfranchi
Attendance: 2,430
Referee: Leighton Hodges (WRU)

=== Round 17 ===
4 March 2016
19:05

Scarlets (Wales)	24–15	(Italy) Benetton Treviso
Try: S. Evans (2) 13' c, 71' c J. Davies 18' c Con: Thomas (2/2); D. Jones (1/1); Pen: D. Jones (1/1) 67'	Report	Try: Barbieri (2) 55' m, 59' c Con: Hayward (1/2); Pen: Hayward (1/2) 21'

Parc y Scarlets
Attendance: 5,236
Referee: John Lacey (IRFU)

4 March 2016
19:35

(1 BP) Edinburgh (Scotland)	23–28	(Ireland) Connacht (1 BP)
Try: Dean 43' m Hoyland 51' c Du Preez 59' m Con: Hidalgo-Clyne (1/3); Pen: Hidalgo-Clyne (2/3) 68', 80'	Report	Try: MacGinty 20' c Heenan 32' c Aki 45' c E. McKeon 72' c Con: Ronaldson (3/3); MacGinty (1/1)

Murrayfield Stadium
Attendance: 3,584
Referee: Ben Whitehouse (WRU)

4 March 2016
19:35

(1 BP) Ulster (Ireland)	32–0	(Italy) Zebre
Try: Williams (2) 10' c, 29' c Browne 62' m P. Marshall 77' c Con: Pad. Jackson (3/4); Pen: Pad. Jackson (2/2) 4', 8'	Report

Kingspan Stadium
Attendance: 15,726
Referee: George Clancy (IRFU)

5 March 2016
15:00

Leinster (Ireland)	19–16	(Wales) Ospreys (1 BP)
Try: Leavy 15' c Con: Madigan (1/1); Pen: Madigan (4/5) 20', 28', 32', 65'	Report	Try: Baker 60' c Con: S. Davies (1/1); Pen: S. Davies (3/3) 3', 46', 67'

RDS Arena
Attendance: 10,897
Referee: Ian Davies (WRU)

5 March 2016
19:35

(1 BP) Munster (Ireland)	26–5	(Wales) Newport Gwent Dragons
Try: Kilcoyne (2) 18' m, 43' c R. Scannell 32' c Cronin 77' c Con: Keatley (2/3); J. Holland (1/1)	Report	Try: Amos 46' m

Thomond Park
Attendance: 13,552
Referee: Marius Mitrea (FIR)

6 March 2016
14:30

Glasgow Warriors (Scotland)	27–20	(Wales) Cardiff Blues (1 BP)
Try: Reid 9' c Swinson 40' c Favaro 74' c Con: Weir (3/3); Pen: Weir (2/2) 6', 20'	Report	Try: Fish 72' m E. Jenkins 79' c Cook 80' m Con: Patchell (1/3); Pen: Patchell (1/1) 56'

Scotstoun Stadium
Attendance: 6,492
Referee: Dudley Phillips (IRFU)

=== Round 12 rescheduled match ===
18 March 2016
19:15

(1 BP) Cardiff Blues (Wales)	37–28	(Ireland) Munster
Try: Cook 32' c Rees 49' c G. Smith 54' c Patchell 73' c Con: Patchell (4/4); Pen: Patchell (2/2) 10', 43'; J. Evans (1/1) 80'	Report	Try: Sweetnam 6' m Sherry 52' c O'Donoghue 78' c Con: Keatley (1/2); J. Holland (1/1); Pen: Keatley (2/2) 3', 46'; J. Holland (1/1) 67'

Cardiff Arms Park
Attendance: 5,017
Referee: David Wilkinson (IRFU)

This match – originally scheduled to be held during Round 12, on 8 January 2016 – was postponed due to a European Rugby Champions Cup fixture rearrangement that occurred as a result of the Paris terrorist attacks in November 2015.

=== Round 9 rescheduled match ===
18 March 2016
19:35

Glasgow Warriors (Scotland)	12–6	(Ireland) Leinster (1 BP)
Pen: Clegg (4/4) 14', 17', 50', 58'	Report	Pen: Nacewa (2/3) 3', 30'

Scotstoun Stadium
Attendance: 6,800
Referee: George Clancy (IRFU)

This match – originally scheduled to be held during Round 9, on 5 December 2015 – was postponed due to a waterlogged pitch.

=== Round 18 ===
25 March 2016
19:00

(1 BP) Munster (Ireland)	47–0	(Italy) Zebre
Try: penalty try (2) 11' c, 73' c R. O'Mahony 26' c Zebo (2) 47' c, 53' c Stander 55' m Murray 64' c Con: J. Holland (5/5); Murray (1/2)	Report

Thomond Park
Attendance: 13,063
Referee: Dudley Phillips (IRFU)

25 March 2016
19:05

(1 BP) Cardiff Blues (Wales)	56–8	(Italy) Benetton Treviso
Try: E. Jenkins 7' c Navidi 32' c Lee-Lo 42' m Dacey 54' m Vosawai 70' c James 73' c Fish 76' m Patchell 78' c Con: Anscombe (3/5); J. Evans (2/3); Pen: Anscombe (2/2) 16', 64'	Report	Try: Lazzaroni 61' m Pen: Hayward (1/1) 14'

Cardiff Arms Park
Attendance: 5,258
Referee: Andrew Brace (IRFU)

25 March 2016
19:35

Glasgow Warriors (Scotland)	27–17	(Ireland) Ulster
Try: Hogg 58' m Seymour 61' c Con: Russell (1/2); Pen: Russell (4/6) 23', 28', 39', 72'; Hogg (1/1) 80'	Report	Try: Henderson 3' c McCloskey 44' c Con: Pad. Jackson (2/2); Pen: Pad. Jackson (1/1) 34'

Scotstoun Stadium
Attendance: 6,800
Referee: John Lacey (IRFU)

26 March 2016
15:00

Ospreys (Wales)	16–25	(Wales) Scarlets
Try: Jos. Matavesi 15' c Con: S. Davies (1/1); Pen: S. Davies (3/3) 27', 31', 71'	Report	Try: Van der Merwe 29' c Con: D. Jones (1/1); Pen: D. Jones (2/2) 6', 36'; Thomas (4/5) 63', 67', 75', 80'

Liberty Stadium
Attendance: 12,051
Referee: Ben Whitehouse (WRU)

26 March 2016
17:15

Connacht (Ireland)	7–6	(Ireland) Leinster (1 BP)
Try: Marmion 13' c Con: MacGinty (1/1)	Report	Pen: Madigan (2/2) 41', 62'

Galway Sportsgrounds
Attendance: 7,300
Referee: Nigel Owens (WRU)

27 March 2016
14:30

(1 BP) Newport Gwent Dragons (Wales)	15–16	(Scotland) Edinburgh
Try: Amos (2) 41' c, 53' m Con: D. Jones (1/2); Pen: D. Jones (1/2) 38'	Report	Try: Watson 44' c Con: Hidalgo-Clyne (1/1); Pen: Kinghorn (1/2) 17'; Hidalgo-Clyne (2/4) 30', 40'

Rodney Parade
Attendance: 6,352
Referee: George Clancy (IRFU)

=== Round 19 ===
1 April 2016
19:05

(1 BP) Newport Gwent Dragons (Wales)	20–26	(Wales) Ospreys (1 BP)
Try: Amos (2) 9' m, 44' m Meyer 67' c Con: Meyer (1/1); Pen: Meyer (1/1) 28'	Report	Try: Hassler 3' m Webb 18' c D. Evans 40' c Underhill 50' c Con: Biggar (3/4)

Rodney Parade
Attendance: 6,413
Referee: John Lacey (IRFU)

1 April 2016
19:35

(1 BP) Edinburgh (Scotland)	29–0	(Italy) Zebre
Try: Hoyland (2) 51' c, 56' c Hidalgo-Clyne 68' c A. Toolis 80' m Con: Tovey (3/4); Pen: Tovey (1/1) 13'	Report

Murrayfield Stadium
Attendance: 3,799
Referee: Leighton Hodges (WRU)

1 April 2016
19:35

Ulster (Ireland)	18–10	(Ireland) Connacht
Try: R. Best 27' m Gilroy 43' c Con: Pad. Jackson (1/2); Pen: Pad. Jackson (2/2) 5', 12'	Report	Try: Blade 54' c Con: O'Leary (1/1); Pen: O'Leary (1/2) 40'

Kingspan Stadium
Attendance: 16,224
Referee: Dudley Phillips (IRFU)

2 April 2016
15:00

(1 BP) Scarlets (Wales)	22–28	(Wales) Cardiff Blues
Try: Barclay 70' c Con: Thomas (1/1); Pen: D. Jones (4/4) 14', 17', 29', 47'; Thomas (1/1) 55'	Report	Try: L. Williams 9' c James 23' m Anscombe 61' c Con: Anscombe (2/3); Pen: Anscombe (3/3) 8', 36', 53'

Parc y Scarlets
Attendance: 9,456
Referee: Marius Mitrea (FIR)

2 April 2016
17:30

Benetton Treviso (Italy)	16–38	(Scotland) Glasgow Warriors (1 BP)
Try: Esposito 35' c Con: Hayward (1/1); Pen: Hayward (3/3) 14', 18', 39'	Report	Try: Gray 11' c Horne 28' c Favaro 42' c Hogg 59' m Hart 67' m Malcolm 73' c Con: Russell (4/6)

Stadio Comunale di Monigo
Attendance: 3,500
Referee: Ben Whitehouse (WRU)

2 April 2016
17:30

Leinster (Ireland)	16–13	(Ireland) Munster (1 BP)
Try: Sexton 36' c Con: Sexton (1/1); Pen: Sexton (3/3) 27', 50', 63'	Report	Try: J. Holland 47' c Con: J. Holland (1/1); Pen: J. Holland (2/2) 12', 31'

Aviva Stadium
Attendance: 43,108
Referee: Ian Davies (WRU)

=== Round 12 rescheduled match ===
8 April 2016
19:30

Zebre (Italy)	14–43	(Scotland) Glasgow Warriors
Try: L. Sarto 3' c Palazzani 20' c Con: Canna (2/2)	Report	Try: Brown 16' c Price 46' c Dunbar 51' c Horne (2) 57' c, 77' m Naiyaravoro 72' m Yanuyanutawa 75' m Con: Weir (3/3); Russell (1/4)

Stadio Sergio Lanfranchi
Attendance: 1,850
Referee: Ian Davies (WRU)

This match – originally scheduled to be held during Round 12, on 8 January 2016 – was postponed due to a European Rugby Champions Cup fixture rearrangement that occurred as a result of the Paris terrorist attacks in November 2015.

=== Round 20 ===
15 April 2016
19:35

(1 BP) Leinster (Ireland)	30–23	(Scotland) Edinburgh (1 BP)
Try: L. McGrath 43' c Van der Flier 50' c McFadden (2) 56' m, 63' m Con: Madigan (2/4); Pen: Madigan (2/2) 7', 11'	Report	Try: Brown 46' m Allen 60' c Kennedy 70' m Con: Tovey (1/3); Pen: Tovey (1/1) 3'; Hidalgo-Clyne (1/1) 78'

RDS Arena
Attendance: 10,233
Referee: Marius Mitrea (FIR)

15 April 2016
19:35

(1 BP) Ospreys (Wales)	47–10	(Italy) Benetton Treviso
Try: D. Evans (2) 8' c, 75' c Baker 21' c Watkin 26' c Cracknell 53' c Dirksen 54' m John 79' c Con: Biggar (6/7)	Report	Try: Sgarbi 66' c Con: Christie (1/1); Pen: Hayward (1/1) 13'

Liberty Stadium
Attendance: 8,455
Referee: David Wilkinson (IRFU)

16 April 2016
15:15

Scarlets (Wales)	10–46	(Scotland) Glasgow Warriors (1 BP)
Try: L. Williams 30' c Con: S. Shingler (1/1); Pen: S. Shingler (1/1) 2'	Report	Try: Russell (2) 6' c, 25' m Jones (2) 37' m, 73' m Pyrgos 41' c Bennett 58' c Seymour 64' c Con: Russell (4/7); Pen: Russell (1/1) 18'

Parc y Scarlets
Attendance: 8,165
Referee: George Clancy (IRFU)

16 April 2016
17:00

Zebre (Italy)	17–47	(Ireland) Ulster (1 BP)
Try: Palazzani 6' c Beyers 59' c Con: Canna (2/2); Pen: Canna (1/1) 18'	Report	Try: Pienaar 2' c Bowe (2) 12' c, 78' c Gilroy 24' c Payne (3) 39' m, 42' c, 51' c Con: Pad. Jackson (3/4); Pienaar (2/2); Olding (1/1)

Stadio Sergio Lanfranchi
Attendance: 3,000
Referee: Nigel Owens (WRU)

16 April 2016
19:15

(1 BP) Connacht (Ireland)	35–14	(Ireland) Munster
Try: Adeolokun (2) 36' c, 54' m penalty try 40' c Bealham 65' c Con: O'Leary (3/4); Pen: O'Leary (3/3) 8', 18', 80'	Report	Try: Zebo 10' c Sherry 23' c Con: J. Holland (2/2)

Galway Sportsgrounds
Attendance: 7,786
Referee: Ben Whitehouse (WRU)

17 April 2016
14:30

Cardiff Blues (Wales)	28–8	(Wales) Newport Gwent Dragons
Try: Turnbull 7' m Lee-Lo 39' c Anscombe 79' c Con: Anscombe (2/3); Pen: Anscombe (3/3) 12', 28', 51'	Report	Try: Pretorius 32' m Pen: D. Jones (1/1) 18'

Cardiff Arms Park
Attendance: 8,203
Referee: Peter Fitzgibbon (IRFU)

=== Round 21 ===
29 April 2016
19:30

Benetton Treviso (Italy)	22–21	(Ireland) Connacht (1 BP)
Try: Morisi 19' m Steyn 22' c penalty try 45' c Con: Hayward (2/3); Pen: Hayward (1/1) 80'	Report	Try: Parata 11' c Carr 14' c Robb 52' c Con: Jo. Cooney (3/3)

Stadio Comunale di Monigo
Attendance: 3,700
Referee: Peter Fitzgibbon (IRFU)

29 April 2016
19:35

(1 BP) Glasgow Warriors (Scotland)	70–10	(Italy) Zebre
Try: Nakarawa (3) 15' c, 42' c, 52' c Ashe 23' c G. Bryce (2) 30' c, 36' c Naiyaravoro 33' c Peterson 63' c Price 65' c Weir 73' c Con: Weir (10/10)	Report	Try: Van Zyl 17' m Boni 38' m

Scotstoun Stadium
Attendance: 6,800
Referee: Andrew Brace (IRFU)

29 April 2016
19:35

(1 BP) Munster (Ireland)	27–19	(Scotland) Edinburgh
Try: R. Scannell 6' c Zebo 27' m Conway 33' m Saili 76' c Con: J. Holland (2/4); Pen: J. Holland (1/1) 21'	Report	Try: Tovey 18' c Con: Tovey (1/1); Pen: Tovey (3/4) 14', 37', 43'; Hidalgo-Clyne (1/1) 64'

Irish Independent Park
Attendance: 8,200
Referee: Ian Davies (WRU)

30 April 2016
15:00

Ulster (Ireland)	30–6	(Ireland) Leinster
Try: penalty try 18' c Payne 57' c Pad. Jackson 78' c Con: Pad. Jackson (2/2); P. Marshall (1/1); Pen: Pad. Jackson (3/3) 11', 54', 70'	Report	Pen: Sexton (2/2) 27', 36'

Kingspan Stadium
Attendance: 17,332
Referee: George Clancy (IRFU)

==== Judgement Day ====
30 April 2016
14:00

Cardiff Blues (Wales)	27–40	(Wales) Ospreys (1 BP)
Try: Summerhill 41' m Navidi 62' c Con: Anscombe (1/2); Pen: Anscombe (5/5) 10', 30', 36', 49', 72'	Report	Try: King 24' c Dirksen (2) 53' m, 58' c Underhill 69' c Webb (2) 74' c, 78' c Con: Biggar (5/6)

Millennium Stadium
Attendance: 68,262
Referee: Nigel Owens (WRU)

30 April 2016
17:00

Newport Gwent Dragons (Wales)	20–34	(Wales) Scarlets (1 BP)
Try: Warren 22' c Hughes 67' c Con: O'Brien (2/2); Pen: O'Brien (2/3) 26', 31'	Report	Try: S. Williams 8' c S. Shingler 13' c S. Evans 45' c G. Davies 74' c Con: S. Shingler (4/4); Pen: S. Shingler (2/2) 24', 29'

Millennium Stadium
Attendance: 68,262
Referee: Ben Whitehouse (WRU)

Notes

- The 68,262 crowd for the two matches, was a Judgement Day and Pro12 match record.

=== Round 22 ===
7 May 2016
15:00

Connacht (Ireland)	14–7	(Scotland) Glasgow Warriors (1 BP)
Try: Aki 18' c O'Halloran 59' c Con: MacGinty (1/1); O'Leary (1/1)	Report	Try: Reid 46' c Con: Russell (1/1)

Galway Sportsgrounds
Attendance: 7,786
Referee: Ian Davies (WRU)

7 May 2016
15:00

(1 BP) Edinburgh (Scotland)	17–21	(Wales) Cardiff Blues
Try: Watson 15' m Scott 19' c Brown 38' m Con: Tovey (1/3)	Report	Try: Lee-Lo 30' c Dolan 62' c G. Smith 65' c Con: Anscombe (3/3)

Murrayfield Stadium
Attendance: 4,962
Referee: John Lacey (IRFU)

7 May 2016
15:00

(1 BP) Leinster (Ireland)	50–19	(Italy) Benetton Treviso
Try: Sexton 8' m Strauss (2) 20' m, 26' c J. McGrath 45' c Nacewa 50' c Murphy 56' m Reid 63' c Ringrose 80' c Con: Sexton (1/3); Nacewa (4/5)	Report	Try: Lazzaroni 61' c Muccignat 72' m Bacchin 77' c Con: Hayward (2/3)

RDS Arena
Attendance: 10,083
Referee: Ben Whitehouse (WRU)

7 May 2016
15:00

(1 BP) Munster (Ireland)	31–15	(Wales) Scarlets
Try: Saili 13' c R. Scannell (2) 25' c, 78' c R. O'Mahony 59' m Stander 68' m Con: J. Holland (3/5)	Report	Pen: S. Shingler (5/5) 9', 21', 28', 37', 64'

Thomond Park
Attendance: 18,929
Referee: Nigel Owens (WRU)

7 May 2016
15:00

(1 BP) Ospreys (Wales)	26–46	(Ireland) Ulster (1 BP)
Try: Biggar 11' c Jos. Matavesi 35' c Grabham (2) 65' m, 74' c Con: Biggar (3/4)	Report	Try: Pad. Jackson 16' c R. Best 26' c Trimble 39' c Henry 55' c Olding 68' c Van der Merwe 76' m Con: Pad. Jackson (5/6); Pen: Pad. Jackson (2/2) 41', 58'

Liberty Stadium
Attendance: 9,923
Referee: Marius Mitrea (FIR)

7 May 2016
16:00

(1 BP) Zebre (Italy)	47–22	(Wales) Newport Gwent Dragons
Try: Fabiani 7' c Van Zyl 17' c L. Sarto 58' c Postiglioni 62' c Haimona 64' c Con: Canna (5/5); Pen: Canna (4/4) 12', 38', 40', 46'	Report	Try: Landman (2) 53' c, 71' c Amos 80' m Con: G. Jones (2/3); Pen: O'Brien (1/1) 1'

Stadio Sergio Lanfranchi
Attendance: 2,650
Referee: David Wilkinson (IRFU)

== Play-offs ==
=== Semi-finals ===
20 May 2016
19:45

Leinster (Ireland)	30–18	(Ireland) Ulster
Try: Nacewa 4' c Heaslip 47' c Cronin 64' c Con: Sexton (3/3); Pen: Sexton (3/3) 10', 15', 56'	Report	Try: Gilroy (2) 38' m, 69' c Con: Pad. Jackson (1/2); Pen: Pad. Jackson (2/2) 26', 31'

RDS Arena
Attendance: 19,100
Referee: Ian Davies (WRU)

21 May 2016
18:30

Connacht (Ireland)	16–11	(Scotland) Glasgow Warriors
Try: Adeolokun 36' c Con: MacGinty (1/1); Pen: MacGinty (3/3) 24', 52', 64'	Report	Try: Nakarawa 48' m Pen: Weir (2/2) 26', 56'

Galway Sportsgrounds
Attendance: 7,800
Referee: Marius Mitrea (FIR)

=== Final ===
28 May 2016
17:30

Connacht (Ireland)	20–10	(Ireland) Leinster
Try: O'Halloran 12' c Adeolokun 21' m Healy 56' m Con: MacGinty (1/3); Pen: MacGinty (1/2) 27'	Report	Try: Cronin 66' c Con: Sexton (1/1); Pen: Sexton (1/1) 43'

Murrayfield Stadium
Attendance: 34,550
Referee: Nigel Owens (WRU)

== Attendances ==
=== By club ===
- Includes semi-finals but not final at Murrayfield

Club	Home Games	Total	Average	Highest	Lowest	% Capacity
(Italy) Benetton Treviso	11	36,300	3,300	5,000	1,000	49%
(Wales) Cardiff Blues	11	130,304 (Note: Attendance values include a 'home game' played at the Principality Stadium on 30 April 2016.)	11,846	68,262	3,658	53%
(Ireland) Connacht	12	65,288	5,441	7,800	3,274	57%
(Scotland) Edinburgh	11	60,317	5,483	23,642	2,475	15%
(Scotland) Glasgow Warriors	11	74,858	6,805	8,000	6,267	64%
(Ireland) Leinster	12	181,414	15,118	43,108	8,612	69%
(Ireland) Munster	11	138,579	12,598	25,600	5,425	66%
(Wales) Newport Gwent Dragons	11	121,363	11,033	68,262	4,128	63%
(Wales) Ospreys	11	94,675	8,607	12,051	7,236	41%
(Wales) Scarlets	11	80,878	7,353	14,568	5,236	49%
(Ireland) Ulster	11	168,407	15,310	17,332	12,640	84%
(Italy) Zebre	11	26,131	2,376	4,509	1,500	48%

=== Highest attendances ===
Home club	Away club	Stadium	Attendance
(Wales) Judgement Day		Millennium Stadium	68,262
(Ireland) Leinster	(Ireland) Munster	Aviva Stadium	43,108
(Ireland) Munster	(Ireland) Leinster	Thomond Park	25,600
(Scotland) Edinburgh	(Scotland) Glasgow	Murrayfield Stadium	23,642
(Ireland) Leinster	(Ireland) Ulster	RDS Arena	19,100
(Ireland) Munster	(Wales) Scarlets	Thomond Park	18,929
(Ireland) Ulster	(Ireland) Leinster	Kingspan Stadium	17,332
(Ireland) Ulster	(Ireland) Munster	Kingspan Stadium	17,211
(Ireland) Ulster	(Scotland) Glasgow	Kingspan Stadium	16,477
(Ireland) Ulster	(Ireland) Connacht	Kingspan Stadium	16,224
(Ireland) Ulster	(Wales) Cardiff	Kingspan Stadium	15,886
(Ireland) Ulster	(Italy) Zebre	Kingspan Stadium	15,726
(Ireland) Leinster	(Ireland) Ulster	RDS Arena	15,552
(Ireland) Ulster	(Wales) Scarlets	Kingspan Stadium	15,201
(Ireland) Munster	(Ireland) Connacht	Thomond Park	15,143
(Ireland) Leinster	(Wales) Scarlets	RDS Arena	14,743
(Wales) Scarlets	(Wales) Ospreys	Parc y Scarlets	14,568
(Ireland) Ulster	(Italy) Benetton Treviso	Kingspan Stadium	14,398
(Ireland) Leinster	(Ireland) Connacht	RDS Arena	14,297

== End of Season Awards ==
=== PRO12 Dream Team ===
Pos		Player	Team
FB	15	(Fiji) Isa Nacewa (c)	(Ireland) Leinster
RW	14	(Ireland) Matt Healy	(Ireland) Connacht
OC	13	(New Zealand) Bundee Aki	(Ireland) Connacht
IC	12	(Samoa) Ben Te'o	(Ireland) Leinster
LW	11	(Ireland) Craig Gilroy	(Ireland) Ulster
FH	10	(Wales) Sam Davies	(Wales) Ospreys
SH	9	(Ireland) Kieran Marmion	(Ireland) Connacht
N8	8	(South Africa) Cornell du Preez	(Scotland) Edinburgh
OF	7	(Ireland) Josh van der Flier	(Ireland) Leinster
BF	6	(Ireland) CJ Stander	(Ireland) Munster
RL	5	(Ireland) Ultan Dillane	(Ireland) Connacht
LL	4	(Fiji) Leone Nakarawa	(Scotland) Glasgow
TP	3	(Ireland) Finlay Bealham	(Ireland) Connacht
HK	2	(New Zealand) Tom McCartney	(Ireland) Connacht
LP	1	(Ireland) Denis Buckley	(Ireland) Connacht

=== Award winners ===
Award	Winner
Players' Player of the Season	(New Zealand) Bundee Aki (Connacht)
Young Player of the Season	(Wales) Sam Davies (Ospreys)
Coach of the Season	(Samoa) Pat Lam (Connacht)
Chairman's Award	(Ireland) John Muldoon (Connacht)
Golden Boot	(Wales) Gareth Anscombe (Cardiff)
Fairplay Award	(Ireland) Ulster
Try of the Season	(Scotland) Tommy Seymour (Glasgow vs Ulster)

== Leading scorers ==
Note: Flags to the left of player names indicate national team as has been defined under World Rugby eligibility rules, or primary nationality for players who have not yet earned international senior caps. Players may hold one or more non-WR nationalities.

=== Top points scorers ===
Rank	Player	Club	Points
1	(Wales) Rhys Patchell	(Wales) Cardiff Blues	174
2	(New Zealand) Jayden Hayward	(Italy) Benetton Treviso	155
3	(Wales) Sam Davies	(Wales) Ospreys	152
4	(Ireland) Paddy Jackson	(Ireland) Ulster	144
5	(Ireland) Ian Keatley	(Ireland) Munster	124

=== Top try scorers ===
Rank	Player	Club	Tries
1	(Ireland) Craig Gilroy	(Ireland) Ulster	10
1	(Ireland) Matt Healy	(Ireland) Connacht	10
3	(Fiji) Isa Nacewa	(Ireland) Leinster	9
4	(Scotland) Damien Hoyland	(Scotland) Edinburgh	8
5	(Wales) Hallam Amos	(Wales) Newport Gwent Dragons	7
5	(Canada) D. T. H. van der Merwe	(Wales) Scarlets	7
