= Matteo Muccignat =

- Born: 8 August 1985 (age 41) Pordenone, Italy
- Height: 1.90 m (6 ft 3 in)
- Weight: 130 kg (20 st 7 lb; 287 lb)

Rugby union career
- Position: Prop
Youth career
- Udine
- –: San Donà
- –: Benetton Treviso
Senior career
Years	Team	Apps	(Points)
2005−2016	Benetton Treviso	85	(30)
2016−2018	Rovigo Delta	29	(15)
2018−2021	Valorugby Emilia	32	(0)
- Correct as of 31 May 2020
International career
Years	Team	Apps	(Points)
2010	Italy A	3	(0)
- Correct as of 31 May 2020
Coaching career
- Years: Team
- 2020−2022: Valorugby Emilia (Assistant coach)

Matteo Muccignat (Pordenone, 8 August 1985) is a retired Italian rugby union player. His usual position was as a Prop and he played for Valorugby Emilia in Top12.

Until 2015–16 Pro12 season he played for Benetton Treviso.

In 2010 Muccignat was also named in the Italy A squad for 2010 IRB Nations Cup.
