= Jordan Coghlan =

Irish rugby union player

- Born: 30 October 1992 (age 34) Dublin, Ireland
- Height: 1.93 m (6 ft 4 in)
- Weight: 115 kg (18.1 st; 254 lb)
- School: Clongowes Wood College

Rugby union career
- Position: Flanker
Amateur team(s)
Years	Team	Apps	(Points)
2021-	Terenure College RFC		
Senior career
Years	Team	Apps	(Points)
2012–2015	Leinster	1	(0)
2015–2016	Munster	8	(5)
2016–2019	Nottingham	63	(81)
2019–2021	Leicester Tigers	11	(5)
2020	→ Nottingham (loan)	4	(0)
- Correct as of 17 June 2021
International career
Years	Team	Apps	(Points)
2012	Ireland U20	9	(10)
- Correct as of 23 June 2012

Jordan Coghlan (born 30 October 1992) is an Irish rugby union player who currently plays in the All Ireland League for amateur side Terenure College RFC. His preferred position is Number 8. He has previously played for Nottingham in the RFU Championship, Leicester Tigers in Premiership Rugby as well as Leinster and Munster in Ireland.

== Career ==
=== Leinster ===
Coghlan made his Leinster debut on 8 September 2012, coming off the bench against Dragons. He was part of the Leinster A team that won the British and Irish Cup in 2013.

=== Munster ===
Coghlan made his Munster debut on 13 September 2015, coming off the bench against Ospreys in the second game of the 2015–16 Pro12. He scored his first try for Munster in the 35-27 win against Cardiff Blues on 17 October 2015. Coghlan made his first start for Munster against Scarlets on 23 October 2015.

=== Nottingham ===
Ahead of the 2016–17 season, Coghlan left Munster to join English RFU Championship side Nottingham.

=== Leicester Tigers ===
Coghlan joined Premiership Rugby side Leicester Tigers ahead of the 2019–20 season. He featured in 11 games before his release from the club was announced on 16 June 2021.

=== Loan to Nottingham ===
Coghlan returned to former club Nottingham on loan from parent club Leicester Tigers in January 2020.

=== Terenure College RFC ===
In 2021, Coughlan signed for Terenure College RFC who play in the All Ireland League (AIL) where he helped them finish 2nd in the 21/22 season losing to Clontarf in the final.

=== Ireland ===
Coghlan represented Ireland Under-20s at the 2012 IRB Junior World Championship, scoring a try against South Africa Under-20s and England Under-20s.
