= Aled Thomas =

Welsh rugby union footballer

- Born: 2 January 1985 (age 41) Bancyfelin, Carmarthenshire, Wales
- Height: 6 ft 0 in (183 cm)
- Weight: 90 kg (14 st 2 lb; 198 lb)

Rugby union career
- Position: Fly-half
Senior career
Years	Team	Apps	(Points)
2004–2005	Scarlets	79	(311)
2005–2008	Newport Gwent Dragons	44	(109)
2008–2011	London Welsh		
2011–2014	Scarlets	7	(61)
2014–2015	Gloucester Rugby		
2015–17	Scarlets	46	(152)
International career
Years	Team	Apps	(Points)
2015	Barbarians	1	(11)
National sevens team
Years	Team		Comps
2009–2015	Wales		
Medal record
Men's rugby sevens
Representing Wales
Rugby World Cup Sevens
Gold medal – first place	2009 Dubai	Team competition

Aled Thomas (born 2 January 1985) is a Welsh rugby union player. A fly-half, who plays for the Scarlets in the Pro14.

Aled Thomas first joined the Scarlets in 2004, making his first appearance in the Celtic League match against Ulster in Ravenhill. Following spells playing for Newport Gwent Dragons and London Welsh, He signed for the Scarlets as cover for the 2011 Rugby World Cup .

Thomas has represented Wales at all Junior age group levels and at Sevens level. On 7 March 2009, Thomas was part of the squad that won the 2009 Rugby World Cup Sevens, scoring the winning try in the final against Argentina.

On 24 March 2014, Thomas signed a two-year deal to play for Gloucester Rugby in the Aviva Premiership for the 2014–15 season.

On 13 February 2015, Thomas made a surprise return to the Wales Sevens squad to take part in the 2015 USA Sevens held in Las Vegas, as part of the 2014–15 Sevens World Series.

After one season with Gloucester, Thomas was granted his early release to rejoin his home region Scarlets in Wales for his third spell at the region, from the 2015–16 season.

On 22 April 2015, Thomas was selected for the Barbarians, as they defeated Scottish club Heriot RFC 97–13 in a friendly match, as part of their 125th Anniversary Special for both clubs.

On 17 June 2016, Carmarthen Quins announced that Thomas had been appointed as backs coach.

On 6 May 2017, Thomas took to Twitter to announce his retirement from rugby. It is believed he will continue his coaching career with Carmarthen Quins following the end of his playing career.
