= Dan Fish =

Welsh rugby union player

Daniel Fish
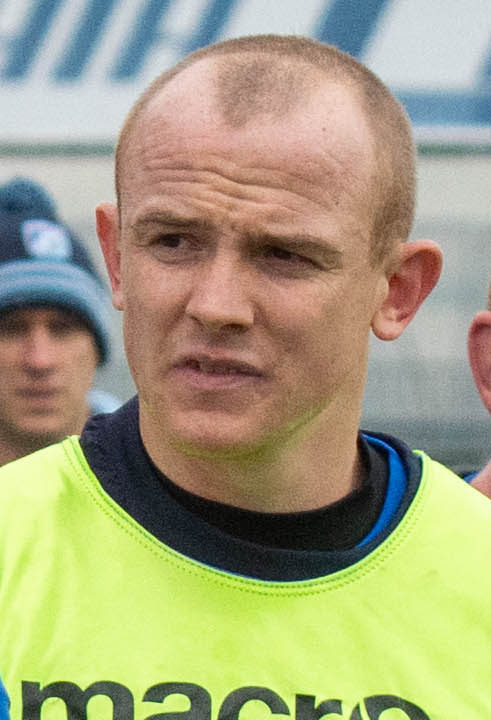
- Fish in 2019
- Born: Daniel Fish; 19 December 1990 (age 35) Tremorfa, Cardiff, Wales
- Height: 1.85 m (6 ft 1 in)
- Weight: 79 kg (12 st 6 lb; 174 lb)
- School: St Illtyd's Catholic High School; St David's Catholic Sixth Form College

Rugby union career
- Position(s): Fly-half, Fullback
- Current team: Cardiff Rugby
Amateur team(s)
Years	Team	Apps	(Points)
- Glamorgan Wanderers
Senior career
Years	Team	Apps	(Points)
2010-	Cardiff Rugby	115	(132)
- Correct as of 11 December 2019
International career
Years	Team	Apps	(Points)
2010	Wales U20	10	(20)
- Correct as of 30 Jun 2010

Daniel Fish (born 19 December 1990) is a Cardiff-born Welsh rugby union player. Originally a full-back, he played club rugby for the Cardiff Rugby and Cardiff RFC, having previously played for Glamorgan Wanderers RFC. Fish was capped at Wales Under-20 level and played regularly as a fly-half. He retired professionally in 2021, but continues to play semi-pro rugby at Cardiff RFC. He is known for a high level of kicking skills, which gave him the nickname "The Codfather".
