= Jonathan Holland (rugby union) =

Irish rugby union player (born 1991)

- Born: Jonathan Holland; 30 August 1991 (age 35) Cork, Ireland
- Height: 1.78 m (5 ft 10 in)
- Weight: 84 kg (13.2 st; 185 lb)
- School: Coláiste Chríost Rí
- University: University College Cork

Rugby union career
- Position: Fly-half
Amateur team(s)
Years	Team	Apps	(Points)
20??–2016	Cork Constitution		
Senior career
Years	Team	Apps	(Points)
2013–2016	Munster	11	(49)
- Correct as of 8 May 2016

Jonathan Holland (born 30 August 1991) is an Irish retired rugby union player. He played as a fly-half for Munster and Cork Constitution.

== Cork Constitution ==
Holland was awarded the 2012–13 Ulster Bank Young Player of the Year Award for Division 1A.

== Munster ==
Holland made his Munster A debut on 19 November 2011, coming on as a substitute against Neath. He made his senior debut for Munster on 23 November 2013, coming on as a substitute against Cardiff Blues. Holland was awarded a development contract with the senior Munster squad for the 2014–15 season in March 2014. Holland was nominated for the John McCarthy Award for Munster Academy Player of the Year on 1 May 2014.

Holland made his first start for Munster on 19 September 2014, against Zebre in the Pro12. He signed a two-year contract with Munster in January 2015, advancing from a development contract to a full contract.

On 25 March 2016, Holland started against Zebre in a 2015–16 Pro12 game, scoring 10 points. On 2 April 2016, Holland started against Leinster, scoring all of Munster's points, including a try, in Munster's 16–13 defeat. On 1 September 2016, it was announced that Holland had been forced to retire from rugby with immediate effect after being advised to do so on medical grounds, having suffered a recurrence of a hamstring injury first sustained in November 2014.

== Coaching ==
Holland joined Cork Constitution's coaching team ahead of their 2017–18 season, working with the backs.
