= Mike Sherry =

Ireland international rugby union player

- Born: Michael Sherry; 18 June 1988 (age 38) Limerick, Ireland
- Height: 1.83 m (6 ft 0 in)
- Weight: 105 kg (16.5 st; 231 lb)
- School: Ardscoil Rís, Limerick

Rugby union career
- Position: Hooker
Amateur team(s)
Years	Team	Apps	(Points)
- Garryowen
Senior career
Years	Team	Apps	(Points)
2009–2019	Munster	108	(60)
2019	→ Gloucester (loan)	5	(5)
- Correct as of 25 May 2019
International career
Years	Team	Apps	(Points)
2012–2013	Ireland Wolfhounds	2	(0)
2013	Ireland	1	(0)
- Correct as of 9 February 2015

Mike Sherry (born 18 June 1988) is an Irish former rugby union player. He played as a hooker and represented Garryowen in the All-Ireland League.

== Early life ==
Sherry was born in Limerick, where he attended Ardscoil Rís and won the Munster Schools Junior Cup.

== Professional career ==
=== Munster ===
Sherry made his Munster debut against Connacht in December 2009. He made his Heineken Cup debut against Toulon in January 2011. He was part of the Munster team that beat Leinster 19–9 in the 2011 Celtic League Grand Final at Thomond Park. He was ruled out for six to eight weeks in October 2011 with an ankle injury. He returned to training in early January 2012, and was named in the Munster A team to play Ulster Ravens in the British and Irish Cup quarter-final on 20 January 2012, making his comeback in the 9–20 win. Sherry made his first Heineken Cup start in the quarter-final against Ulster on 8 April 2012. He agreed a contract extension with Munster in January 2013.

Sherry became one of Munster's youngest ever captains on 16 February 2013, when he led the side out in their Pro12 match against Scarlets. Sherry was ruled out for six months in December 2013, after rupturing a cruciate ligament in his knee. Sherry also had a shoulder operation in January 2014 and, following a second shoulder operation in August 2014, he was ruled out for four to five months. Sherry made his return from the injury on 5 September 2015. He scored two tries in Munster's 35–27 win against Cardiff Blues on 17 October 2015. He started the opening pool game of the 2015–16 European Rugby Champions Cup against Treviso on 14 November 2015. In January 2016, Sherry signed a two-year contract extension with Munster.

In August 2016, Sherry underwent a surgical procedure on his back which ruled him out for 3–4 months. In July 2017, Sherry began a gradual reintroduction to on-field training following the back injury, which had kept him sidelined since May 2016. He made his return to rugby on 24 August 2017, when he was a replacement in Munster's 35–26 pre-season win against Worcester Warriors. On 1 September 2017, Sherry came off the bench against Benetton in Round 1 of the 2017–18 Pro14, making his return to competitive rugby. He signed a one-year contract extension with Munster in April 2018.

Sherry won his 100th cap for Munster during their 24–24 draw with Ulster on 28 April 2018, a fixture in which he also captained the province. Sherry left Munster at the end of the 2018–19 season, later announcing that he had retired from rugby, citing injury and a lack of contract offers as his reasoning for doing so.

=== Loan to Gloucester ===
Sherry joined English Premiership Rugby side Gloucester on a loan deal until the end of the 2018–19 season in March 2019.

== Ireland ==
Sherry was called into the Ireland squad at the 2011 Rugby World Cup as precautionary cover for Rory Best. He was selected in the Ireland Wolfhounds squad for their game against England Saxons in January 2012. He made his Wolfhounds debut as a replacement against England Saxons on 28 January 2012. He was selected in the senior Ireland squad for the June 2012 tour of New Zealand, but did not feature in any of the tests. Sherry was called into Ireland's squad for the 2013 Six Nations Championship on 21 January 2013. Sherry won his second cap for Ireland Wolfhounds on 25 January 2013, again against England Saxons in a friendly.

Sherry was named in the Ireland squad for the 2013 Ireland rugby union tour of Canada and United States on 19 May 2013. He made his debut for the senior Ireland team on 8 June 2013, coming on as a replacement against the United States. On 23 October 2013, Sherry was named in the Ireland squad for the 2013 Autumn Tests.
