= Rory Clegg =

English rugby union player (born 1990)

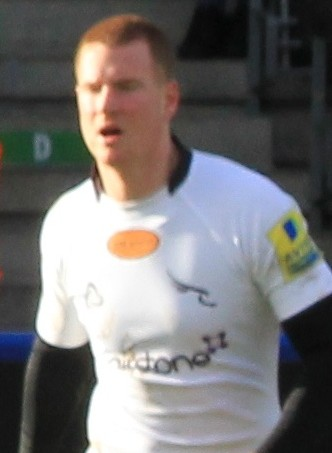
- Clegg at the 2013–14 English Premiership, Harlequins vs Falcons
- Born: 6 January 1990 (age 36) Hanover, West Germany
- Height: 1.83 m (6 ft 0 in)
- Weight: 90 kg (14 st 2 lb; 198 lb)
- School: Barnard Castle School

Rugby union career
- Position: Fly-half
Senior career
Years	Team	Apps	(Points)
2008–2009	Newcastle Falcons	15	(99)
2009–2013	Harlequins	49	(279)
2013	Yorkshire Carnegie	6	(61)
2013–2015	Newcastle Falcons	35	(241)
2015	West Harbour RFC	3	(4)
2015	Glasgow Warriors	4	(48)
2015–2016	Oyonnax	5	(8)
2016–17	Glasgow Warriors	12	(47)
2017-	Ealing Trailfinders	1	(21)
- Correct as of 5 March 2017
International career
Years	Team	Apps	(Points)
2008–2010	England U20	17	(32)
2011	England Saxons	3	(50)

Rory Clegg (born 6 January 1990) is a former rugby union player. He played as a fly-half.

== Early life ==
Clegg was born on 6 January 1990 at the British Military Hospital in Hanover, Germany; his father was serving in the army. He attended Barnard Castle School in County Durham and played for the School first XV coached by former Harlequin, Martin Pepper. Rory started playing rugby with Darlington RFC and Barnard Castle School aged 10 and went on to represent Barnard Castle School first XV, coached by former Harlequin Martin Pepper, County Durham and the North of England at age group levels.

== Career ==
By the time Clegg celebrated his 21st birthday in 2011, he had not only represented England at three levels, under-16, under-18 and under-20, but also played in 25 Guinness Premiership matches and scored 96 points, split between Harlequins and Newcastle Falcons.

Clegg made his England Saxons’ debut for his country’s youngest Churchill Cup squad and converted 11 of the 13 tries in the 87–8 win over the USA at Franklin’s Gardens, Northampton in the opening match on 4 June 2011. He also landed all his seven kicks, five conversions and two penalty goals, despite the wind and rain, in the 41–14 win against Tonga at Kingsholm, Gloucester eight days later. The Churchill Cup final at Sixways, Worcester was against Canada, and he was named man of the match in the 37–6 victory.

He began his representative career with England under-16, became the starting fly half for the unbeaten under-18 side in 2008 and played for the under-20 team in the 2009 and 2010 IRB Junior World Championships in Japan and Argentina.

He has participated in overseas tours to New Zealand, with his school, with England sides to Australia, Argentina and Japan and routinely to Europe as part of European rugby cup competitions.

His mentors have included Rob Andrew, Mark Mapletoft, Jonny Wilkinson, Nick Evans and Jack Frater.

Spotted by Rob Andrew, Clegg launched his top-level club career for the Newcastle Falcons when 18 as deputy for the injured Jonny Wilkinson against Sale Sharks in September 2008. He landed three penalty goals in a 14–9 Guinness Premiership defeat that impressed Falcons’ director of rugby Steve Bates, who said: "He was outstanding for a youngster playing his first game against a back line full of internationals."

In 2009, he moved to Harlequins and made his starting debut in the Premiership on 31 October in front of a record sell-out crowd of 14,282 at the Twickenham Stoop. In the final minute, he booted over a third penalty from the halfway line that salvaged a 9–9 draw with London Irish. He was a replacement for Harlequins in their 2011–12 Premiership final victory over Leicester Tigers. He went on to make over 50 appearances for Harlequins amassing over 270 points before being lured back to Newcastle Falcons by Dean Richards. During the period January–April 2013, he was loaned to Leeds Carnegie where he played 8 games amassing a total of 80 points.

Clegg joined the Falcons ahead of the 2013–14 Aviva Premiership following their promotion from the RFU Championship. His contract with the Falcons ran out at the end of the 2014–15 season.

On 17 July 2015, it was announced that Clegg had secured a short term professional contract with Glasgow Warriors to provide depth and competition for places during the 2015 World Cup when the Warriors will lose a host of their top stars on Scotland duty.

In November 2015, Clegg joined Top-14 side Oyonnax when the Glasgow short-term deal ended.

Having impressed in his first spell at Glasgow Warriors, Clegg re-signed with the Glasgow side on 17 March 2016 in a deal to at least May 2017.

On 27 February 2017, it was announced that Clegg had joined Ealing Trailfinders till the end of the 2017 season.
