= Kelly Haimona =

Italy international rugby union player

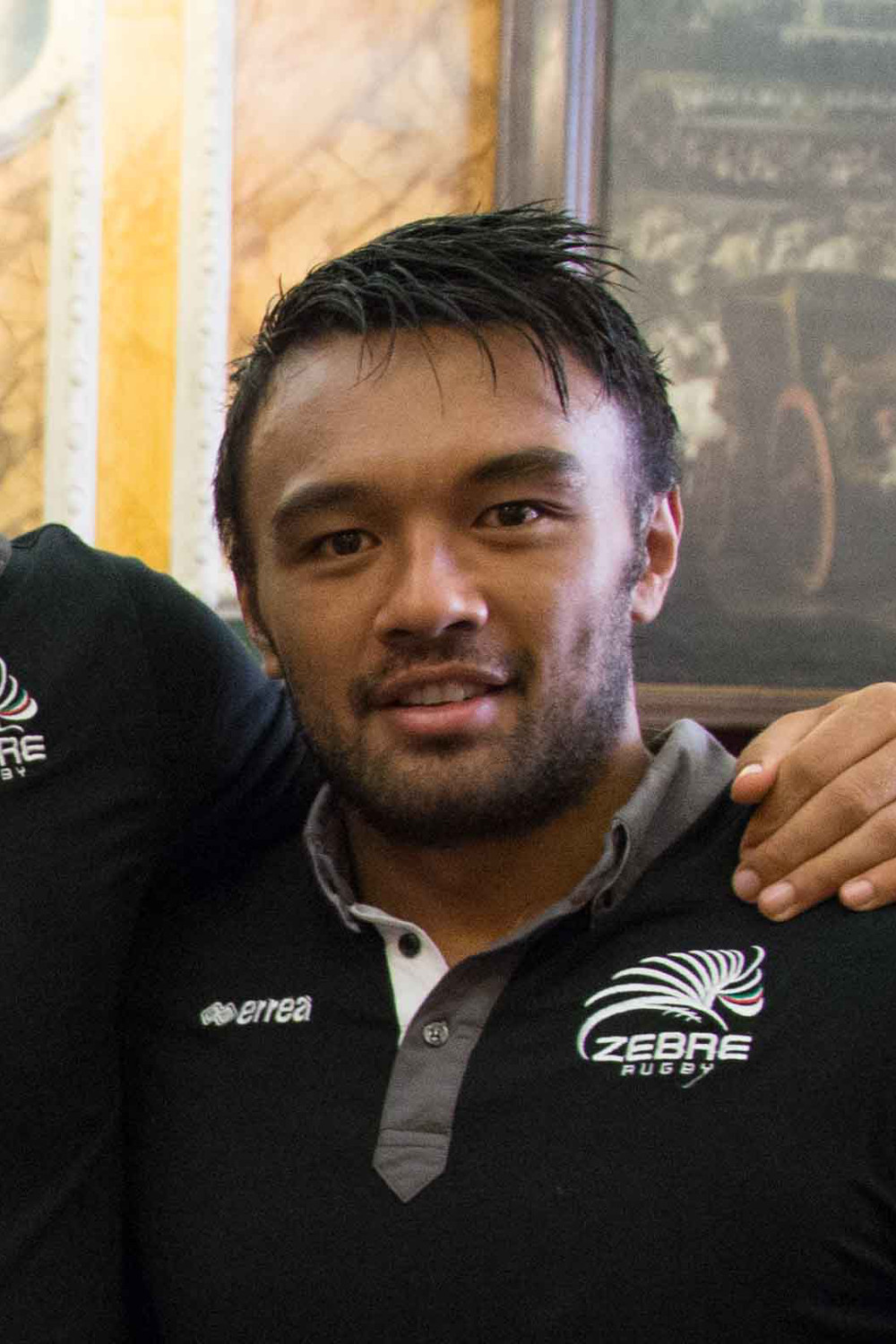
- Born: 30 July 1986 (age 40) Rotorua, New Zealand
- Height: 1.85 m (6 ft 1 in)
- Weight: 107 kg (16 st 12 lb)
- School: Rotorua Boys' High School

Rugby union career
- Position(s): Fly-half, Centre, Fullback
Amateur team(s)
Years	Team	Apps	(Points)
2005–11	Whakarewarewa		
2011-13	Lyons Piacenza		
Senior career
Years	Team	Apps	(Points)
2007−09	Bay of Plenty	15	(4)
2013−14	Calvisano	24	(282)
2014	→Zebre	2	(5)
2014–16	Zebre	27	(102)
2016−17	Bay of Plenty	12	(46)
- Correct as of 21 October 2016
International career
Years	Team	Apps	(Points)
2014–16	Italy	11	(65)
- Correct as of 19 March 2016

Kelly Haimona (born 30 July 1986) is a New Zealand-born international rugby union player who has represented Italy. He has played fly-half, centre, and fullback. He played for Zebre in the Italian Pro14 competition and returned to New Zealand in 2016 to play for the Bay of Plenty.

== Career ==
=== Domestic rugby ===
==== New Zealand ====
Haimona's rugby career began in 2005, playing for his local club Whakarewarewa in the Baywide Premier Rugby competition. In 2006, he helped his team to become champions of the Baywide Premier Rugby competition, scoring a try and kicking a crucial penalty to beat Rotoiti 18–17. His passion for the team saw Kelly become captain for a number of seasons, and in 2007, he was named in the Bay of Plenty squad for the 2007 Air New Zealand Cup. Within weeks of joining the squad, he was promoted into the region's top squad for the rest of the competition, following injury to regular Number 10 Murray Williams. He made his Bay of Plenty debut off the bench on 25 August 2007 against Otago. He was reselected for Bay of Plenty again in 2008, but struggled for game time during the season. After his brief stint with the Steamers, he continued to play with Whakarewarewa until 2011, where he was targeted by the Italian national team selectors. However, that would mean he would have to play in Italy for three consecutive years to earn player residency.

==== Italy ====
Haimona's Italian career began in late 2011, playing for Lyons Piacenza in the Serie A championship - the second tier of the Italian Rugby Union championships. He consistently started and played well at Fly-half for Lyons, and for many seasons, there were a lot of interest in him from championships above Serie A. However, it wasn't until early 2013 that Calvisano had a look at him and signed him for the 2013-14 National Championship of Excellence (NCE). He made his Calvisano debut on 21 September 2013 in a 36–0 victory over San Donà. He played in every match that season for Calvisano, being their first choice Fly-Half in all their 2013–14 European Challenge Cup matches - though Calvisano failed to win any matches in their pool, made up of; Brive, Newcastle Falcons and București Wolves. At best, they secured a 20–all draw with Brive in the opening match. His form in the NCE caught the eyes Zebre, who had loaned Haimona in February and March 2014 from Calvisano. His first match was a starting position at Fly-half against Irish side Leinster, who were 31–8 victors on that occasion. However, he was vital in Zebre's 15–10 win over Cardiff Blues.

On 26 August 2014, Haimona was officially announced in Zebre's squad for the 2014–15 Pro12 season. On 27 September, Zebre beat Ulster 13–6, and during this match Haimona scored a 40-metre drop goal to help Zebre secure an historic victory.

=== International rugby ===
On 8 October, after three years in the waiting, Haimona was named in the Italian national team for their 2014 end-of-year tests against Samoa, Argentina and South Africa. He made his debut in the opening match against Samoa on 8 November 2014 where he kicked 14 points in the 24–13 win, Italy's first win in nine attempts.
