= Lloyd Linton =

- Born: Lloyd Linton; 1 July 1988 (age 38) Belfast, Northern Ireland
- School: Royal Belfast Academical Institution
- University: Aberdeen University
- Occupation: Rugby union referee

Rugby union career
Amateur team(s)
Years	Team	Apps	(Points)
-	Instonians		
Refereeing career
Years	Competition		Apps
2013-17	Pro12		
2016	Nations Cup		
2017-19	Pro14		

Lloyd Linton (born 1 July 1988) is a professional rugby union referee who represented the Scottish Rugby Union. He has since moved to Germany to continue his medical career.

== Rugby union career ==
=== Playing career ===
==== Amateur career ====
He played rugby union for Instonians, the Royal Belfast Academical Institution's Former Pupils club.

=== Referee career ===
==== Professional career ====
Linton refereed his first Pro12 match in April 2013; a match between Cardiff Blues and Zebre.

He was offered a contract by the Scottish Rugby Union in 2014.

He has gone on to referee matches in the Pro14.

He has also been Assistant Referee in the European Rugby Champions Cup; refereed in the European Rugby Challenge Cup and also in South Africa

==== International career ====
Linton was named as referee in the 2016 Nations Cup; also known as the Rugby Europe International Championships.

== Outside of rugby ==
Linton is also a qualified doctor. He moved to Germany to continue his medical career; but as rugby union is a growing sport there, opportunities are there to continue refereeing.
