= Ben Whitehouse =

Welsh rugby union referee

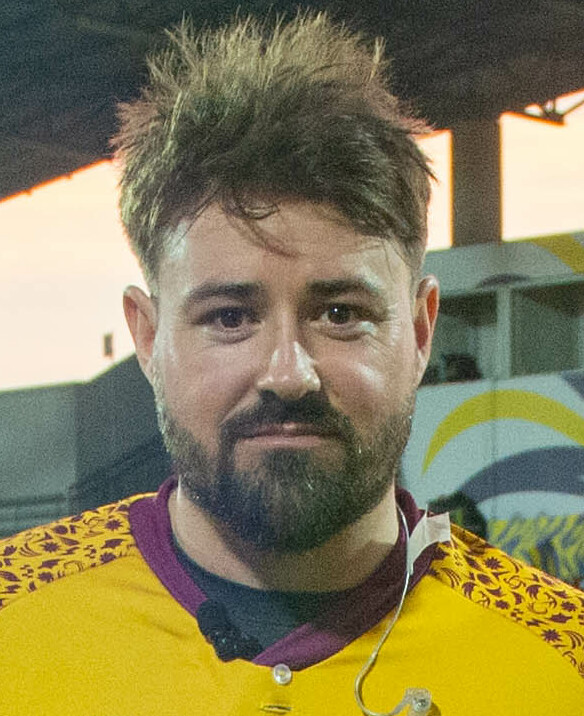
- Ben Whitehouse
- Born: Ben Whitehouse; 9 August 1990 (age 36) Gowerton, Swansea, Wales
- School: Gowerton Comprehensive School
- Notable relative: Nigel Whitehouse (father)
- Occupation: Rugby union referee

Rugby union career
Refereeing career
Years	Competition	Apps
2014–2026	Pro12/URC	
2015–2026	Test matches	
2015–2026	Challenge Cup	
2016–2026	Champions Cup	
- Correct as of 19 October 2026

Ben Whitehouse (born 9 August 1990) is a Welsh rugby union coach and referee. He is currently the specialist coach for the Welsh national team and one of five professional referees at the Welsh Rugby Union, alongside Craig Evans and Adam Jones.

== Career ==
Whitehouse started refereeing at the age of 19, during the 2009/10 European season. Since then, Whitehouse has come through the ranks at the Welsh Rugby Union, refereeing at the Union' top level the Principality Premiership. He was part of the Welsh Rugby Union referees academy in 2013, where in February 2014, he was selected for the 2014 IRB Junior World Rugby Trophy tournament in Hong Kong, which saw him referee the final between Tonga U20 and Japan U20. Later that year, he appeared in his first British and Irish Cup, and was selected by the four home unions to officiate the final between Leinster A and Leeds Carnegie.

On 21 November 2014, he refereed his first professional game, Connacht v Zebre during the 2014–15 Pro12 season. That season, he also made his international debut, refereeing Belgium v Sweden during the 2014–16 European Nations Cup Division 1B season. At the end of that season, Whitehouse signed a professional referee's contract with the WRU on 5 June 2015, just a day before he refereed his first World Rugby Under 20 Championship match, between France U20 and Japan U20.

In the 2015/16 season, he became a regular appointment at Pro12 level, and made his first European appearance, officiating the Edinburgh–Grenoble clash on 13 November 2015 as part of the 2015–16 European Rugby Challenge Cup. He later made his Champions Cup debut, refereeing Leicester Tigers v Benetton Treviso on 16 January 2016.

On 18 June 2016, Whitehouse had his first World Rugby international appointment, assistant referee for the second and third test of Ireland's tour of South Africa. On 26 November, he took charge of his first World Rugby appointment, refereeing Romania against Uruguay during the 2016 end-of-year rugby union internationals.

On 24 June 2017, he refereed the World Cup Qualifier between the United States and Canada in Hamilton, Ontario, Canada.

On 19 October 2026, Whitehouse announced that he was retiring from officiating to take up a specialist coach role with the Wales national rugby team. His final match will see him officiate the Welsh derby between Ospreys and Dragons in the United Rugby Championship.
