= Macauley Cook =

Welsh rugby union footballer

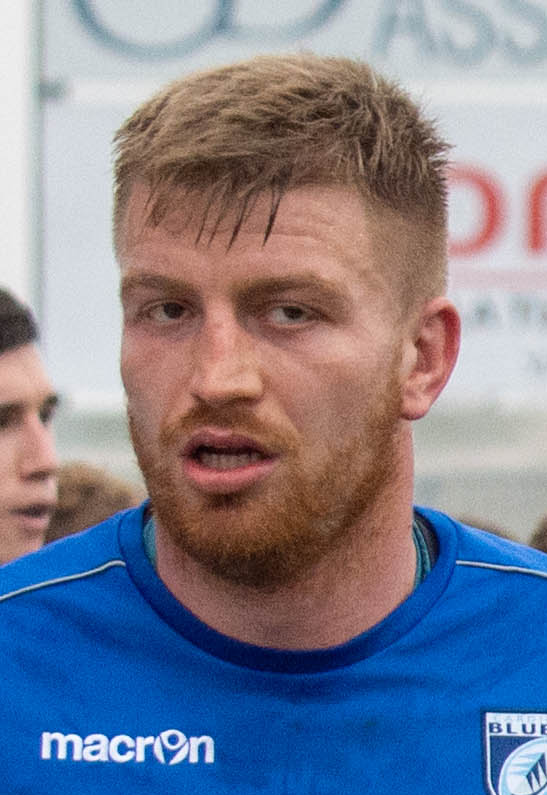
- Born: Macauley Cook; 31 December 1991 (age 34) Church Village, Llantwit Fardre, Wales
- Height: 6 ft 7 in (200 cm)
- Weight: 18 st 13 lb (120 kg)

Rugby union career
- Position(s): Blindside Flanker; Lock
- Current team: Jersey Reds
Senior career
Years	Team	Apps	(Points)
2010-2020	Cardiff Blues	167	(85)
2020–	Jersey Reds		
- Correct as of 11 December 2019

Macauley Cook (born 31 December 1991) is a Welsh rugby union player. A flanker or lock forward, he plays club rugby for the Jersey Reds having previously played for his country, Cardiff and Cardiff Blues. He is a fluent Welsh speaker.
