= Jayden Hayward =

Italy international rugby union player

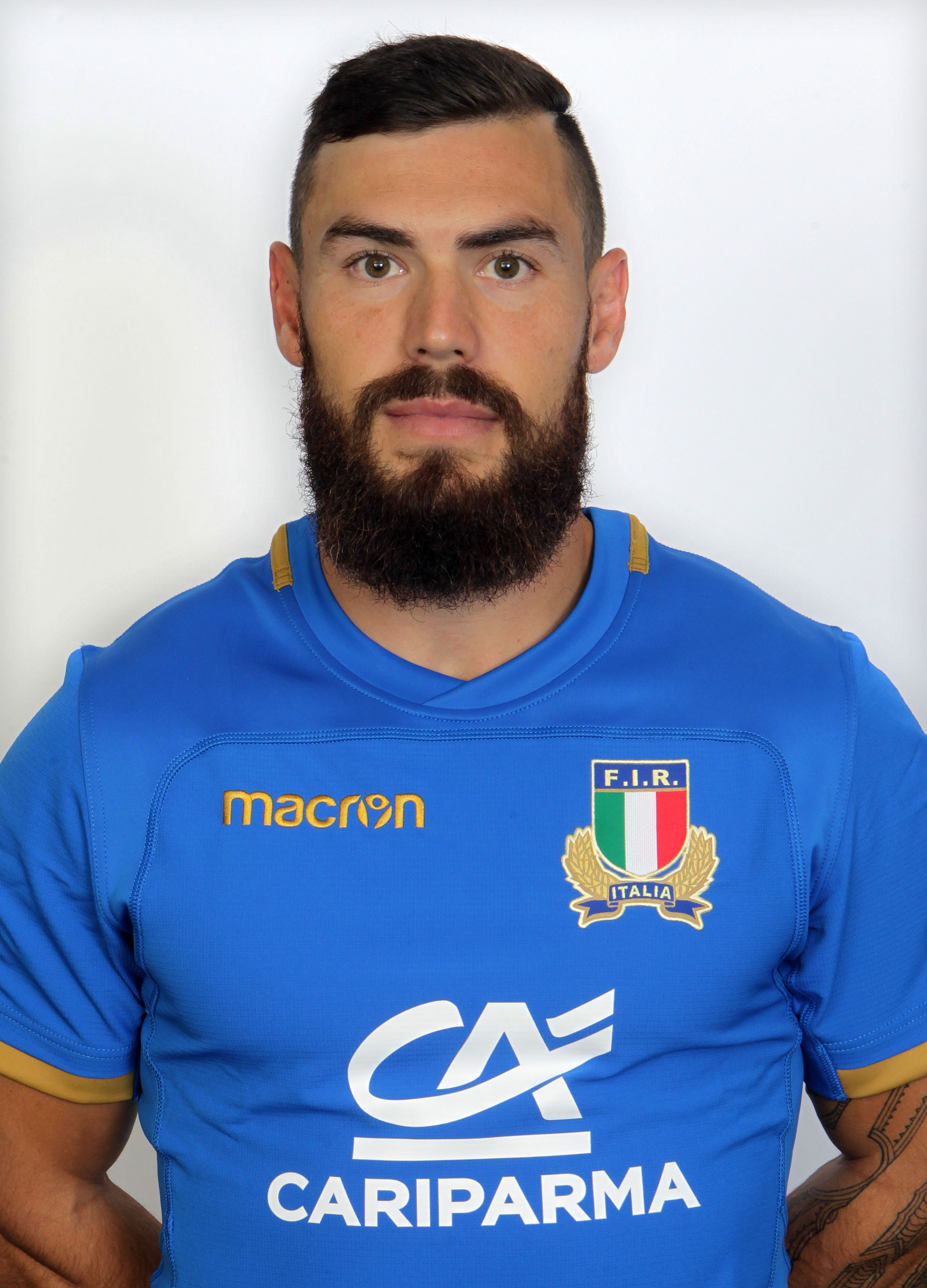
- Hayward representing the Italian Rugby Federation, October 2017
- Born: 11 February 1987 (age 39) Hawera, New Zealand
- Height: 185 cm (6 ft 1 in)
- Weight: 90 kg (198 lb; 14 st 2 lb)
- School: Hawera High School

Rugby union career
- Position(s): Fullback, Centre
- Current team: Benetton
Senior career
Years	Team	Apps	(Points)
2008–2012	Taranaki	59	(100)
2009–2010	Highlanders	9	(0)
2011–2012	Hurricanes	15	(0)
2013–2014	Force	23	(122)
2014–2021	Benetton Rugby	126	(303)
- Correct as of 19 Jun 2021
International career
Years	Team	Apps	(Points)
2017–2020	Italy	27	(5)
- Correct as of 24 Oct 2020

Jayden Hayward (born 11 February 1987) is a New Zealand rugby union player who played for the Italy national rugby union team and for Benetton Rugby. He can play as a fly-half, a centre or a fullback.

His rugby professional career began in New Zealand with Taranaki in 2008, before a move to the Western Force in 2013.

== Domestic career ==
Aged only 20, Hayward was one of the break-out stars of the 2008 Air New Zealand Cup, his debut championship year for Taranaki, scoring three tries in eight appearances. In his first season of first division rugby, picked up two awards – for the most promising player of the year and for back of the year. Hayward's performance didn't go unnoticed by the national media or the Super 14 coaches. He received high praise from television, print and radio commentators. Hayward didn't play in the opening two games and only got his chance as a replacement against Tasman in Nelson. He made an immediate impact with his decisive running and ability to spot a gap. His ability to put a player into space also caught the eye. He finished the year as the first-choice second five-eighth.

After an impressive showing in the Air New Zealand Cup in 2008, Hayward was the second-youngest player (next to Israel Dagg) included on the Highlanders squad for the 2009 Super 14 season. He earned his first Super Rugby start in the Highlanders historic 6–0 victory over the Crusaders in Week 4 of the competition, and made a further 3 appearances as a substitute. In Taranaki, Hayward continued to be a key contributor, appearing in 13 matches and recording 2 tries.

He returned to the Highlanders for 2010, Hayward was given an opportunity to start the first two games of the season, but found himself out-of-favour as the season went along, making only 3 substitute appearances the rest of the way. He was one of the more consistent backs of the 2010 ITM Cup, playing every game for the amber and blacks and scored five tries. Hayward was also Top try-scorer for the side and was judged back of the year ahead of finalists Kurt Baker and David Smith.

Hayward was not brought back to the Highlanders for the 2011 Super 15 season, and instead signed on with the Hurricanes as a member of their wider training group. He was called up as a replacement for Ma’a Nonu who was serving a one-week suspension, but injuries elsewhere and compelling form made him a permanent squad member from that point on, and seven of his 11 appearances were in the starting XV. Playing his fourth consecutive ITM Cup season for Taranaki in 2011, Hayward broke a New Zealand first-class record – scoring a try in 10 consecutive matches. The run started against Hawke's Bay in September 2010 and ended when he failed to score against Bay of Plenty in August 2011. Nevertheless, there was a bigger prize at season's end; the Ranfurly Shield.

After playing his second Super Rugby season in 2012 with the Hurricanes and after 58 appearances for Taranaki, Hayward signed a two-year contract with the Western Force.

In 2014, Hayward moved to Treviso, Italy, to play for Benetton Rugby until 2021 season.

== International career ==
Hayward had been included in a 24-strong squad for a four-day national sevens camp in Mt Maunganui. It was the first of two before Tietjens named a squad of 12 for the opening tournaments of the 2007–08 IRB Sevens World Series, to be played in Dubai and South Africa in December.

In 2017, Hayward obtained Italian citizenship and is now playing for Italy, making his test debut against Fiji at Catania on 11 November 2017. On 18 August 2019, he was named in the final 31-man squad for the 2019 Rugby World Cup. He also represented Italy on 27 occasions with 5 points, from 2017 to 2020.
