= Garyn Smith =

- Born: Garyn Smith; 12 July 1995 (age 31) Pontypridd, Wales
- Height: 180 cm (5 ft 11 in)
- Weight: 94 kg (14 st 11 lb)
- University: University of South Wales

Rugby union career
- Position: Centre
- Current team: Cornish Pirates
Senior career
Years	Team	Apps	(Points)
2014-2022	Cardiff Blues	115	(50)
2022-	Cornish Pirates	0	(0)
- Correct as of 27 May 2022
International career
Years	Team	Apps	(Points)
- Wales U20

Garyn Smith (born 12 July 1995) is a Welsh rugby union player who plays for the Cornish Pirates at centre. He was a Wales under-20 international.

He made his debut for the Cardiff Blues in 2014 having previously played for their academy and Pontypridd RFC.

On 27 May 2022, Smith signed a one-year contract with Cornish Pirates after being released by Cardiff Blues.
