= Rynard Landman =

South African rugby union player

- Full name: Rynard Jaco Landman
- Born: 24 July 1986 (age 40) East London, South Africa
- Height: 1.96 m (6 ft 5 in)
- Weight: 120 kg (18 st 13 lb; 265 lb)
- School: Despatch High School
- University: North-West University

Rugby union career
- Position: Lock / Flank
- Current team: Dragons
Youth career
- 2004: Mighty Elephants
- 2005–2007: Leopards
Amateur team(s)
Years	Team	Apps	(Points)
2011	NWU Pukke	7	(20)
Senior career
Years	Team	Apps	(Points)
2008–2011	Leopards	41	(10)
2009	Lions	2	(0)
2011	Boland Cavaliers	13	(20)
2012–2014	Griquas	26	(40)
2013–2014	Cheetahs	18	(0)
2014–present	Dragons	115	(70)
- Correct as of 28 May 2018
International career
Years	Team	Apps	(Points)
2009	Highveld XV	1	(0)
- Correct as of 22 September 2017

Rynard Jaco 'Ligtoring' Landman (born 24 July 1986) is a South African rugby union player. He usually plays as a lock and occasionally as a flanker.

== Career ==
Landman played his youth rugby with the Leopards and that's where he began his senior rugby career. He played more than 40 games for the Potchefstroom-based side before joining the Boland Cavaliers in 2011. He only spent one season in Wellington before moving to the Griquas in 2012. Strong performances in the local Vodacom Cup and Currie Cup competitions allied to injuries to Martin Muller and Andries Ferreira saw him become an important member of the Cheetahs team that reached the play-offs in the 2013 Super Rugby season.

=== Newport Gwent Dragons ===
Landman signed for Welsh side the Dragons on a three-year deal prior to the 2014–15 Pro12 season.
