= Dorian Jones =

- Born: Dorian Luc Jones Abergavenny, Wales
- Height: 175 cm (5 ft 9 in)
- Weight: 86 kg (13 st 8 lb)
- School: Myerscough College
- University: University of Wales Institute, Cardiff (UWIC) Cardiff Metropolitan University

Rugby union career
- Position: Fly-half / Full-back
- Current team: SUA Agen
Senior career
Years	Team	Apps	(Points)
2013-2018	Dragons	71	(243)
2018-2018	Worcester Warriors	4	(23)
2018-2021	Soyaux Angoulême XV Charente	56	(467)
2021- 2023	US Carcassonne	25	(255)

Dorian Jones (born 27 September) is a Welsh rugby union player, who has represented Wales 7s and who currently plays for SUA Agen in Rugby Pro D2 (

== Personal ==
His brother is former Wales U20s and Wales 7s Rugby Union player Rhys Jones. His father is former Wales International flanker Kingsley Jones.
