= Ronan O'Mahony =

Irish rugby union player

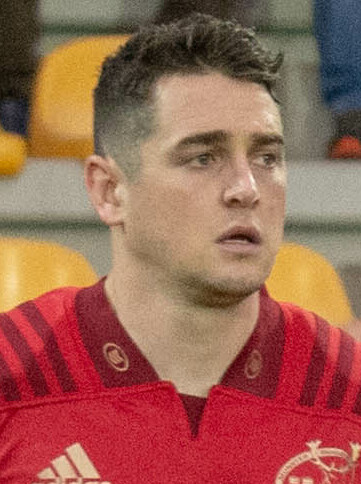
- Born: 28 May 1989 (age 37) Limerick, Ireland
- Height: 1.80 m (5 ft 11 in)
- Weight: 90 kg (14 st; 200 lb)
- School: Castletroy College
- Notable relative: Barry O'Mahony (brother)

Rugby union career
- Position(s): Wing, Fullback
Amateur team(s)
Years	Team	Apps	(Points)
20??–2019	Garryowen		
Senior career
Years	Team	Apps	(Points)
2013–2019	Munster	70	(105)
- Correct as of 2 March 2019
International career
Years	Team	Apps	(Points)
2009	Ireland U20	6	(5)
- Correct as of 20 April 2013

Ronan O'Mahony (born 28 May 1989) is an Irish former rugby union player, who played for Munster. He normally played as a wing, but occasionally played fullback. O'Mahony represented Garryowen in the All-Ireland League.

== Munster ==
O'Mahony made his debut for Munster A on 27 November 2009, replacing Simon Zebo in a British and Irish Cup game against Bristol and scoring a try. He was part of the Munster A team that won the 2011–12 British and Irish Cup, scoring a try against Neath. He was promoted to a development contract with the senior Munster squad for the 2013–14 season. O'Mahony made his debut for the senior Munster team on 19 April 2013, starting against Dragons in a Pro12 fixture and scoring a try. He scored the winning try in Munster's 16–10 win against Scarlets on 21 December 2013. O'Mahony signed a one-year development contract extension in March 2014. He signed a two-year contract extension in February 2015. On 24 January 2016, O'Mahony scored two tries and won the Man-of-the-Match in Munster's 28–5 win against Benetton. On 16 March 2017, it was announced that O'Mahony had signed a two-year contract extension with Munster. On 1 May 2017, it was announced that O'Mahony would miss the remainder of the 2016–17 season after suffering a fractured fibula in Munster's win against Benetton on 29 April 2017. He made his return from the injury on 19 January 2018, coming off the bench for Munster A in their 27–0 British and Irish Cup win against Ospreys Premiership Select. O'Mahony was forced to retire from rugby in April 2019 due to the broken leg and dislocated ankle he suffered in April 2017.

== Ireland ==
O'Mahony made his debut for Ireland Under-20 on 14 February 2009, coming off the bench against Italy Under-20 and scoring a try in the 2009 Under-20 Six Nations Championship.
