= Jason Tovey =

Welsh rugby union player (born 1989)

- Born: Jason Leighton Tovey; April 28, 1989 (age 37) Newport, Wales
- Height: 180 cm (5 ft 11 in)
- Weight: 86.6 kg (13.64 st; 191 lb)
- School: Cwmcarn High School

Rugby union career
- Position: Fly-half
Amateur team(s)
Years	Team	Apps	(Points)
2006–2007	Newport	5	(30)
2007–2008	Bedwas	17	(62)
2008	Newport	8	(61)
2018–	Cross Keys		
2022-	Ynysddu River Rats RFC		
- Correct as of 20 May 2009
Senior career
Years	Team	Apps	(Points)
2008–2012	Dragons	164	(966)
2012–2013	Cardiff Rugby	17	(22)
2013–2016	Dragons	63	(384)
2016–2018	Edinburgh	34	(166)
2018–2019	Dragons	4	(23)
2019–2022	Cardiff Rugby	28	(112)
- Correct as of 12 October 2022
International career
Years	Team	Apps	(Points)
2008–2009	Wales U20	10	(39)
- Correct as of 20 May 2009

Jason Tovey (born 28 April 1989) is a retired Welsh rugby union player who played at fly-half. He has represented the Wales under-20.

== Club career ==
=== Newport RFC ===
Tovey played junior and colts rugby for Risca RFC. Usually a fullback or fly-half, Tovey spent two years with the Dragons Academy, first playing at the age of 15 playing a full season at fullback for Newport RFC. At the age of seventeen and was then moved to fly-half.

=== Newport Gwent Dragons: 2008-2012 ===
Tovey made his debut for Newport Gwent Dragons against the Ospreys in a Celtic League defeat on Friday 25 April 2008 On 22 February 2009 he became the first Dragons player to score a hat-trick of tries in an official match, scoring 23 of the 26 points in the win over Ulster at Rodney Parade.

In May 2010 Tovey was voted Young Player of the Year at the Welsh professional players awards.

=== Cardiff Blues: 2012-2013 ===
On 23 March 2012, it was announced that Tovey would move to Cardiff Blues for the 2012–13 season.

=== Return to the Dragons: 2013-2016 ===
Tovey rejoined Newport Gwent Dragons for the start of the 2013–14 season.

=== Edinburgh Rugby:2016-2018 ===
In March 2016 Tovey joined Edinburgh Rugby on a 2-year deal.

=== Return to the Dragons: 2018–2019 ===
Tovey rejoined the Dragons for a third spell for the 2018-2019 season. He was released at the end of the season.

=== Second stint with Cardiff: 2019–2022 ===
Tovey once again joined Cardiff Rugby in 2019, following his release from the Dragons. He retired at the end of the 2021–2022 season.

=== Ynysddu River Rats: 2022 - Present ===
Upon professional retirement Tovey joined his local team Ynysddu RFC. Unfortunately he failed to consistently break into the 1st XV so opted to step back into the “River Rats” (Nickname for Ynysddu 2nd XV). Tovey fills in for Ynysddu 1st XV regular fly-half Jeremy Roberts when selection dictates.

== International ==
Tovey was called up to the senior Wales squad for the tour of North America in 2009, though he was later cut from the squad and put on stand by. In June 2011 he was named the Wales national rugby union team 45-man training squad for the 2011 Rugby World Cup.
