= 2010–11 Munster Rugby season =

- Ground(s): Thomond Park; Musgrave Park (Capacity: 26,500; 8,500)
- CEO: (Republic of Ireland) Garrett Fitzgerald
- Coach: Tony McGahan (Director of Rugby)
- Captain: Paul O'Connell
- League: Celtic League
- 2010–11: 1st, Champions
1st kit	2nd kit

The 2010–11 Munster Rugby season was Munster's tenth season competing in the Celtic League alongside which they also competed in the Heineken Cup for the sixteenth time. They also competed in the European Challenge Cup for the first time after elimination from the Heineken Cup. It was Tony McGahans third season as director of rugby.

== Summary ==
Munster were drawn in Pool 3 of the Heineken Cup alongside the Ospreys, London Irish and RC Toulon. Munster lost 23–17 away to London Irish, before defeating RC Toulon 45–18 at Thomond Park on 16 October 2010. Munster defeated Ospreys 22–16, but lost the reverse fixture at Liberty Stadium 19–15. In round 5 Munster went to RC Toulon, losing 32–16. As a result of this defeat, Munster failed to qualify for the quarter-finals of the Heineken Cup for the first time in 13 years. As one of the top three runners up in the Heineken cup pool stage, Munster entered the quarter-final stage of the Challenge Cup where they defeated Brive 42–37 in France before losing at home 12–20 to Harlequins.

In the Magners league Munster finished top of the table with nineteen wins and three defeats after twenty two matches to qualify for the semi-final playoffs where they defeated Ospreys 18–11. They then played in the 2011 Celtic League Grand Final where they defeated Leinster by 19 points to 9 to claim their third league title.

== 2010-11 Playing Squad ==
Note: Flags indicate national union under World Rugby eligibility rules. Players may hold more than one non-World Rugby nationality.

Player	Position	Union
Jerry Flannery	Hooker	Ireland
Denis Fogarty	Hooker	Ireland
Damien Varley	Hooker	Ireland
Stephen Archer	Prop	Ireland
Peter Borlase	Prop	New Zealand
Tony Buckley	Prop	Ireland
John Hayes	Prop	Ireland
Marcus Horan	Prop	Ireland
Darragh Hurley	Prop	Ireland
Wian du Preez	Prop	South Africa
Dave Ryan	Prop	Ireland
Dave Foley	Lock	Ireland
Ian Nagle	Lock	Ireland
Donncha O'Callaghan	Lock	Ireland
Paul O'Connell (c)	Lock	Ireland
Mick O'Driscoll	Lock	Ireland
Donnacha Ryan	Lock	Ireland
Billy Holland	Flanker	Ireland
Tommy O'Donnell	Flanker	Ireland
Peter O'Mahony	Flanker	Ireland
Alan Quinlan	Flanker	Ireland
Niall Ronan	Flanker	Ireland
David Wallace	Flanker	Ireland
Paddy Butler	Number 8	Ireland
James Coughlan	Number 8	Ireland
Denis Leamy	Number 8	Ireland

Player	Position	Union
Tomás O'Leary	Scrum-half	Ireland
Peter Stringer	Scrum-half	Ireland
Duncan Williams	Scrum-half	Ireland
Ronan O'Gara	Outside-half	Ireland
Paul Warwick	Outside-half	Australia
Declan Cusack	Outside-half	Ireland
Tom Gleeson	Centre	Ireland
Lifeimi Mafi	Centre	New Zealand
Barry Murphy	Centre	Ireland
Sam Tuitupou	Centre	New Zealand
Danny Barnes	Wing	Ireland
Keith Earls	Wing	Ireland
Ian Dowling	Wing	Ireland
Doug Howlett	Wing	New Zealand
Johne Murphy	Wing	Ireland
Scott Deasy	Fullback	Ireland
Denis Hurley	Fullback	Ireland
Felix Jones	Fullback	Ireland

=== Coaching and Management team ===
Position	Name	Nationality
Director of Rugby	Tony McGahan	Australia
Team Manager	Shaun Payne	South Africa
Forwards Coach	Laurie Fisher	Australia
Backs Coach	Jason Holland	New Zealand
Technical Advisor	Anthony Foley	Ireland
Head of Strength & Conditioning	Paul Darbyshire	
Strength and Conditioning Coach	Tom Comyns	Ireland
Strength and Conditioning Coach	Aidan O'Connell	Ireland
Strength & Conditioning Coach	Joe Gallanagh	Ireland
Medical Co-ordinator & Head of Physiotherapy	Anthony Coole	Ireland
Physiotherapist	Neil Tucker	Ireland

=== Players in ===
- Johne Murphy: from Leicester
- Corey Hircock: from Bedford
- Sam Tuitupou from Worcester Warriors
- Wian du Preez from Free State Cheetahs
- Peter Borlase from Crusaders

=== Players out ===
- Jean de Villiers to Western Province and Stormers
- Jeremy Manning to Newcastle Falcons
- Julien Brugnaut to Racing 92
- Ciarán O'Boyle returned to club
- Nick Williams to Aironi
- Eoghan Grace to Exeter Chiefs

== 2010–11 Celtic League ==
	Team	Pld	W	D	L	PF	PA	PD	TF	TA	Try bonus	Losing bonus	Pts
1	(Ireland) Munster	22	19	0	3	496	327	+169	44	22	5	2	83
2	(Ireland) Leinster	22	15	1	6	495	336	+159	50	25	5	3	70
3	(Ireland) Ulster	22	15	1	6	480	418	+62	44	35	3	2	67
4	(Wales) Ospreys	22	12	1	9	553	418	+135	56	29	6	7	63
5	(Wales) Scarlets	22	12	1	9	503	453	+50	49	43	5	7	62
6	(Wales) Cardiff Blues	22	13	1	8	479	392	+87	37	33	3	3	60
7	(Wales) Newport Gwent Dragons	22	10	1	11	444	462	−18	47	49	3	4	49
8	(Scotland) Edinburgh	22	9	0	13	421	460	−39	39	44	2	5	43
9	(Ireland) Connacht	22	7	1	14	394	459	−65	32	44	3	6	39
10	(Italy) Benetton Treviso	22	9	0	13	374	502	−128	29	58	0	2	38
11	(Scotland) Glasgow Warriors	22	6	1	15	401	543	−142	33	48	1	6	33
12	(Italy) Aironi	22	1	0	21	247	517	−270	21	52	0	8	12
Correct as of 7 May 2011

=== Semi-final ===
14 May 2011
18:30

Munster (Ireland)	18 – 11	(Wales) Ospreys
Try: Barnes (2) 32' m, 57' c Con: O'Gara (1/2); Pen: O'Gara (2/4) 14', 49'	Report	Try: Fussell 78' m Pen: Biggar (2/2) 38', 55'

Thomond Park
Referee: Nigel Owens

=== Grand Final ===
28 May 2011
17:05

Munster (Ireland)	19 – 9	(Ireland) Leinster
Try: Howlett 12' c Earls 66' m Penalty try 79' c Con: O'Gara (2/3)	Report	Pen: Sexton (3/4) 29', 46', 60'

Thomond Park
Attendance: 26,100
Referee: Nigel Owens

== 2010-11 Heineken Cup ==
=== Pool 3 ===
Team	P	W	D	L	Tries for	Tries against	Try diff	Points for	Points against	Points diff	TB	LB	Pts
(France) Toulon (6)	6	4	0	2	13	13	0	143	134	+9	1	0	17
(Ireland) Munster [7]	6	3	0	3	17	9	+8	143	122	+21	2	2	16
(Wales) Ospreys	6	3	0	3	7	11	−4	117	113	+4	0	2	14
(England) London Irish	6	2	0	4	9	13	−4	107	141	−34	0	1	9

9 October 2010
17:45

London Irish (England)	23 – 17	(Ireland) Munster
Try: Ojo 41' m Con: Lamb (0/1); Pen: Lamb (4/4) 8', 11', 20', 37'; D. Armitage (1/2) 73'; Drop: Lamb 33'	Report	Try: Tuitupou 80' m Con: O'Gara (0/1); Pen: O'Gara (4/5) 5', 39', 55', 69'

Madejski Stadium, Reading
Attendance: 20,188
Referee: Christophe Berdos (France)

16 October 2010
15:30

Munster (Ireland)	45 – 18	(France) Toulon
Try: Leamy 9' c Buckley 20' c Howlett (2) 36' c, 62' c O'Driscoll 59' c Coughlan 79' c Con: O'Gara (6/6); Pen: O'Gara (1/2) 47'	Report	Try: Genevois 1' c van Niekerk 75' m Con: Contepomi (1/1); Wilkinson (0/1); Pen: Contepomi (1/3) 30'; Drop: Wilkinson 49'

Thomond Park, Limerick
Attendance: 26,000
Referee: Wayne Barnes (England)

12 December 2010
13:00

Munster (Ireland)	22 - 16	(Wales) Ospreys
Try: Howlett 10' m Wallace 58' c Murphy 63' c Con: O'Gara (2/3); Pen: O'Gara (1/3) 40'	Report	Try: Bowe 42' c Con: Biggar (1/1); Pen: Biggar (3/5) 1', 12', 67'

Thomond Park
Attendance: 26,000
Referee: Christophe Berdos (France)

18 December 2010
15:30

Ospreys (Wales)	19 - 15	(Ireland) Munster
Try: Phillips 25' c Con: Biggar (1/1); Pen: Biggar (4) 17', 36', 55', 68'	Report	Try: Buckley 23' c Earls 58' m Con: O'Gara (1/2); Pen: O'Gara 5'

Liberty Stadium
Attendance: 12,189
Referee: Romain Poite (France)

16 January 2011
16:00

Toulon (France)	32 - 16	(Ireland) Munster
Try: Loamanu 22' c Sackey 37' c Con: Wilkinson (2/2); Pen: Wilkinson (6/8) 8', 14', 16', 34', 41', 59'	Report	Try: Wallace 76' c Con: O'Gara (1/1); Pen: O'Gara (3/3) 2', 25', 40'

Stade Félix Mayol
Attendance: 13,900
Referee: Dave Pearson (England)

22 January 2011
15:30

Munster (Ireland)	28 – 14	(England) London Irish
Try: Varley 46' c Ronan 70' c Earls 73' c Hurley 79' c Con: O'Gara (4/4)	Report	Try: Mapusua 58' c Tagicakibau 67' c Con: Bowden (1/1); Lamb (1/1)

Thomond Park
Attendance: 26,000
Referee: Peter Allan (Scotland)

== 2010-11 Amlin Challenge Cup ==
=== Quarter-final ===
9 April 2011
14.00

Brive (France)	37 - 42	(Ireland) Munster
Try: Uys 17' c Estebanez 20' c Palisson 70' c Perry 80' c Con: Belie (4/4) 17',20',80',70'; Pen: Belie 10',36',45'	Report	Try: Howlett (2) 1' c, 22' c Earls (2) 4' c, 46' c Stringer 50' c Con: O'Gara (4/5); Pen: O'Gara (3/3) 53', 66', 68'

Stade Amédée-Domenech, Brive-la-Gaillarde
Attendance: 8,500
Referee: Dave Pearson (England)

=== Semi-final ===
30 April 2011
13:00

Munster (Ireland)	12 – 20	(England) Harlequins
Try: Jones 40' c Howlett 78' m Con: O'Gara (1/2)	Report	Try: Robson 9' c Care 34' c Con: Evans (1/1); Care (1/1); Pen: Clegg (2/2) 49', 59'

Thomond Park, Limerick
Attendance: 24,907
Referee: Romain Poite (France)
