= Wian (given name) =

Wian is a given name. Notable people with the given name include:

- Wian Conradie (born 1994), Namibian rugby union player
- Wian du Preez (born 1982), South African rugby union player
- Wian Vosloo (born 1995), South African rugby union player
- Wian van Vuuren (born 1993), Namibian cricketer
