= 2011 Celtic League Grand Final =

Rugby union match

2010-11 Celtic League Grand Final
- Event: 2010–11 Celtic League
Munster	Leinster
(Ireland)	(Ireland)
19	9
- Date: 28 May 2011
- Venue: Thomond Park, Limerick
- Man of the Match: David Wallace
- Referee: Nigel Owens (WRU)
- Attendance: 26,100
- Weather: Dry

The 2010-11 Celtic League Grand Final was the final match of the 2010–11 Celtic League season. The final was won by Munster who defeated Leinster by 19–9 at Thomond Park to claim their third Celtic League title.

== Background and Build Up ==
2010-11 was the tenth Celtic League season and the fifth and final season with Magners as title sponsor. It would also prove to be the final season before the league was rebranded as "Pro12" from 2011 to 2012. The regular season began on 3 September 2010 and finished on the weekend of 6–8 May 2011. During these stages, each team played every other team both home and away and were awarded points according to the standard bonus point system. This was the second season to follow the play-off structure to determine the Celtic League champion, with the top four teams qualifying for the semi-finals. The winner of each semi final advanced to the Grand Final, which took place 28 May and was hosted by the team that finished highest in the table following the regular season, which was Munster. The previous week on 21 May, Leinster had won the 2011 Heineken Cup. Munster fielded the same starting line-up from their 18-11 semi-final win against the Ospreys. An ankle injury sustained in the Heineken Cup Final prevented Leinster's Gordon D'Arcy's from starting, Fergus McFadden instead started alongside Brian O'Driscoll in the centre. Heinke van der Merwe and Shane Jennings also started for Leinster instead of Cian Healy and Kevin McLaughlin from the Heineken Cup Final team.

All tickets for the final sold out. The match was shown live on TV in Ireland by RTÉ Two and also by TG4, in the UK the match was covered by BBC Two Wales and BBC Alba. Highlights were shown in Central and Northern Scotland on STV.

== Route to the final ==
=== 2010-11 Final Table ===
Under the standard bonus point system, points were awarded as follows:

- 4 points for a win
- 2 points for a draw
- 1 "bonus" point for scoring 4 tries (or more) (Try bonus)
- 1 "bonus" point for losing by 7 points (or fewer) (Losing bonus)

	Team	Pld	W	D	L	PF	PA	PD	TF	TA	Try bonus	Losing bonus	Pts
1	(Ireland) Munster	22	19	0	3	496	327	+169	44	22	5	2	83
2	(Ireland) Leinster	22	15	1	6	495	336	+159	50	25	5	3	70
3	(Ireland) Ulster	22	15	1	6	480	418	+62	44	35	3	2	67
4	(Wales) Ospreys	22	12	1	9	553	418	+135	56	29	6	7	63
5	(Wales) Scarlets	22	12	1	9	503	453	+50	49	43	5	7	62
6	(Wales) Cardiff Blues	22	13	1	8	479	392	+87	37	33	3	3	60
7	(Wales) Newport Gwent Dragons	22	10	1	11	444	462	−18	47	49	3	4	49
8	(Scotland) Edinburgh	22	9	0	13	421	460	−39	39	44	2	5	43
9	(Ireland) Connacht	22	7	1	14	394	459	−65	32	44	3	6	39
10	(Italy) Benetton Treviso	22	9	0	13	374	502	−128	29	58	0	2	38
11	(Scotland) Glasgow Warriors	22	6	1	15	401	543	−142	33	48	1	6	33
12	(Italy) Aironi	22	1	0	21	247	517	−270	21	52	0	8	12
Under the standard bonus point system, points are awarded as follows: 4 points for a win; 2 points for a draw; 1 bonus point for scoring 4 tries (or more) (Try bonus); 1 bonus point for losing by 7 points (or fewer) (Losing bonus)
Green background (rows 1 to 4) are play-off places. Correct as of 7 May 2011. Source: RaboDirect PRO12

=== Previous 2010-11 Celtic League meetings ===
2 October 2010
19:30

Leinster (Ireland)	13 – 9	(Ireland) Munster (1 BP)
	Report

Aviva Stadium
Attendance: 50,645
Referee: Jérôme Garces

2 April 2011
19:30

Munster (Ireland)	24 – 23	(Ireland) Leinster (1 BP)
	Report

Thomond Park
Attendance: 25,923
Referee: Andrew Small

=== Semi-finals ===
13 May 2011
19:05

Leinster (Ireland)	18 – 3	(Ireland) Ulster
Try: McFadden 25' m Fitzgerald 72' c Con: McFadden (1/1); Pen: Sexton (2/3) 5', 40'	Report	Pen: Pienaar (1/1) 62'

RDS Arena
Referee: George Clancy

14 May 2011
18:30

Munster (Ireland)	18 – 11	(Wales) Ospreys
Try: Barnes (2) 32' m, 57' c Con: O'Gara (1/2); Pen: O'Gara (2/4) 14', 49'	Report	Try: Fussell 78' m Pen: Biggar (2/2) 38', 55'

Thomond Park
Referee: Nigel Owens

== Match ==
=== Summary ===
Ronan O'Gara converted a Doug Howlett try after twelve minutes before Johnny Sexton responded with a penalty for Leinster after twenty nine minutes to leave Munster 7-3 ahead at half time. The Munster try, which Howlett scored in the corner was the first Munster scored against Leinster since 2009. In the second half Donncha O'Callaghan was sin-binned for not rolling away and Sexton scored from the resulting penalty. After sixty six minutes O'Gara found Keith Earls with a cross-field kick to the corner which the winger caught before stretching to ground the ball with one hand. Munster were awarded a penalty try with one minute remaining, which O'Gara converted to leave the final score at 19–9.

=== Details ===
28 May 2011
17:05

Munster (Ireland)	19 – 9	(Ireland) Leinster
Try: Howlett 12' c Earls 66' m Penalty try 79' c Con: O'Gara (2/3)	Report	Pen: Sexton (3/4) 29', 46', 60'

Thomond Park
Attendance: 26,100
Referee: Nigel Owens

(Ireland) Munster:
FB	15	(Ireland) Felix Jones
RW	14	(New Zealand) Doug Howlett
CT	13	(Ireland) Danny Barnes
CT	12	(Tonga) Lifeimi Mafi
LW	11	(Ireland) Keith Earls
FH	10	(Ireland) Ronan O'Gara
SH	9	(Ireland) Conor Murray
N8	8	(Ireland) James Coughlan
OF	7	(Ireland) David Wallace
BF	6	(Ireland) Donnacha Ryan
RL	5	(Ireland) Paul O'Connell (c)
LL	4	(Ireland) Donncha O'Callaghan
TP	3	(Ireland) John Hayes
HK	2	(Ireland) Damien Varley
LP	1	(Ireland) Marcus Horan
Substitutions:
HK	16	(Ireland) Mike Sherry
P	17	(South Africa) Wian du Preez
P	18	(Ireland) Stephen Archer
L	19	(Ireland) Denis Leamy
FL	20	(Ireland) Niall Ronan
SH	21	(Ireland) Peter Stringer
FH	22	(Australia) Paul Warwick
C	23	(Ireland) Johne Murphy
Coach:
(Australia) Tony McGahan

(Ireland) Leinster:
FB	15	(Fiji) Isa Nacewa
RW	14	(Ireland) Shane Horgan
CT	13	(Ireland) Brian O'Driscoll
CT	12	(Ireland) Fergus McFadden
LW	11	(Ireland) Luke Fitzgerald
FH	10	(Ireland) Johnny Sexton
SH	9	(Ireland) Eoin Reddan
N8	8	(Ireland) Jamie Heaslip
OF	7	(Ireland) Shane Jennings
BF	6	(Ireland) Seán O'Brien
RL	5	(Scotland) Nathan Hines
LL	4	(Ireland) Leo Cullen (c)
TP	3	(Ireland) Mike Ross
HK	2	(South Africa) Richardt Strauss
LP	1	(South Africa) Heinke van der Merwe
Substitutions:
HK	16	(Ireland) Aaron Dundon
P	17	(Ireland) Cian Healy
P	18	(Cook Islands) Stan Wright
L	19	(Ireland) Devin Toner
L	20	(Ireland) Kevin McLaughlin
SH	21	(Ireland) Paul O'Donohoe
FH	22	(Ireland) Ian Madigan
C	23	(Ireland) Eoin O'Malley
Coach:
(New Zealand) Joe Schmidt

Touch judges:

Television match official:

== Reaction ==
Leinster coach Josef Schmidt felt that fatigue may have been a factor in their defeat to Munster in the Final. He felt that coming only a week after their Heineken Cup win their energy levels may not have been a high as Munster's, "To be honest, I kind of felt that Munster needed it more than we wanted it. They showed a lot of character, and that made it difficult for us to really keep our tempo, and play the game that we wanted to play" he said. Munster coach Tony McGahan was delighted with his team's win saying "It’s huge for everyone right across the board, from the playing group, the management and the organisation to the development officers and young players coming through, and more important to the supporters. They can walk around with a smile on their faces, knowing that we have done something very important in the context of the Magners League season". Munster captain Paul O'Connell said that the game was a very good thing for Irish rugby, "Both sides have a lot of leadership, and no little skill, people talk about this being a good era for Ireland". Munster's John Hayes noted that it was important to win the knock out matches, saying "We were disappointing in Europe, but good in the Magners, you can finish the League phase of the competition on top of the table, but it doesn’t get you anything, it is important to win the knock-out matches".
