= Keith Earls =

Irish rugby union player (born 1987)

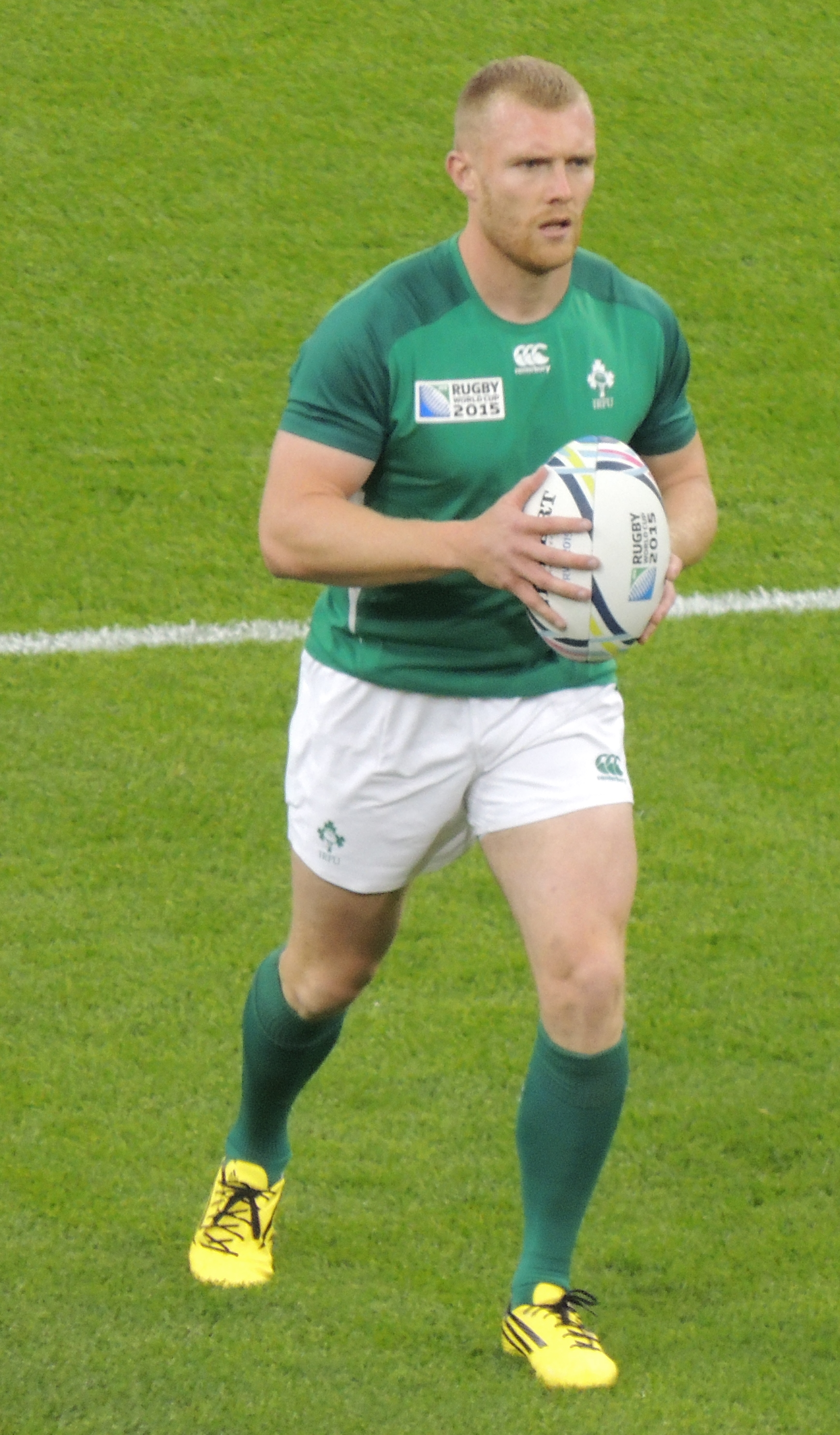
- Earls representing Ireland during the 2015 Rugby World Cup
- Full name: Keith Gerard Earls
- Born: 2 October 1987 (age 39) Moyross, Ireland
- Height: 1.78 m (5 ft 10 in)
- Weight: 87 kg (13.7 st; 192 lb)
- School: St. Munchin's College

Rugby union career
- Position(s): Centre, Fullback, Wing
Amateur team(s)
Years	Team	Apps	(Points)
- Thomond
- Garryowen
- Young Munster
Senior career
Years	Team	Apps	(Points)
2007–2023	Munster	202	(320)
- Correct as of 27 May 2023
International career
Years	Team	Apps	(Points)
2007	Ireland U20	5	(5)
2007–2015	Ireland Wolfhounds	8	(25)
2008–2023	Ireland	101	(180)
- Correct as of 9 September 2023

Keith Gerard Earls (born 2 October 1987) is an Irish former rugby union player who played as a wing for United Rugby Championship club Munster and the Ireland national team. He retired following the 2023 Rugby World Cup.

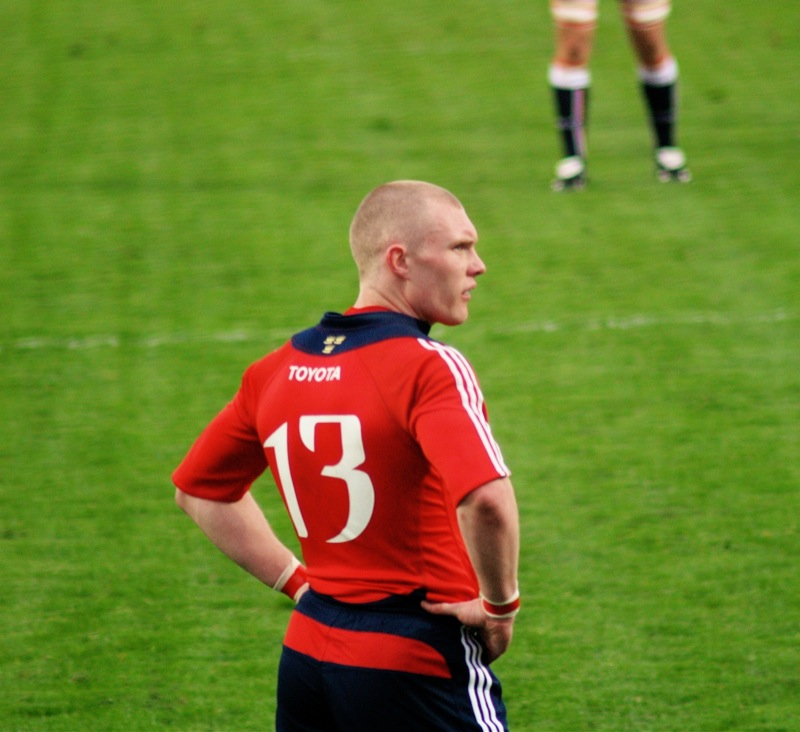
Earls playing for Munster

== Early life ==
Earls was born in Moyross, a council estate in Limerick, to Ger and Sandra Earls. He has one younger sister. Ger was well-known in Limerick for his playing exploits with Thomond and Young Munster, winning the 1992–93 All-Ireland League with the latter, and for being part of the Munster team that beat 1991 World Cup winners Australia in 1992.

Earls first began playing underage rugby for Thomond, as an openside flanker, and started secondary school at St Munchin's College, before moving to St Nessan's Community College, which was closer to home. A move into midfield led to Earls being convinced to return to St Munchin's, and he won the Munster Schools Rugby Senior Cup with the college in 2006.

Earls went on to play for Ireland Schools and then joined the Munster Academy, during which time he played for Ireland Under-19s, Ireland Under-20s, with whom he won a Grand Slam in the 2007 Six Nations Under 20s Championship, Ireland 7s and Munster A, before earning a professional contract with Munster and moving to Garryowen. Like his father before him, Earls then played for Young Munster.

== Munster ==
=== 2006–2012 ===
Earls made his Munster debut against Ospreys in April 2007. During the 2007–08 season, Earls was part of the Munster squad that beat Toulouse in the 2008 Heineken Cup Final. In the 2008–09 season, Earls really made his mark in the Munster first team, scoring 10 tries, including a hat-trick in the Celtic League against Dragons in September 2008 and a brace in the Heineken Cup quarter-final against Ospreys in May 2009

Earls started against Northampton Saints in Munster's 31–27 round 1 2009–10 Heineken Cup defeat on 10 October 2009. Earls also started the 41–10 round 2 win against Benetton on 17 October 2009. He then started the 24–23 round 3 win against Perpignan on 11 December 2009. He also started the reverse round 4 fixture on 20 December 2009, which Munster won 37–14. Earls scored two tries in the round 5 44–7 win against Benetton on 16 January 2010. Earls also started the 12–9 round 6 victory against Northampton Saints on 22 January 2010. Earls then started the 33–19 quarter-final victory, also against Northampton, on 10 April 2010. Earls scored a try in Munster's 18–7 semi-final defeat at the hands on Biarritz on 2 May 2010.

Earls played for Munster during their historic 15–6 win over Australia on 16 November 2010. Earls was also part of the Munster team that beat Leinster to win the 2011 Magners League Grand Final. He injured his knee in the first minute of Munster's Pro12 match against Leinster on 4 November 2011, and was ruled out for 4–6 weeks. He made his return against Scarlets in Munster's 2011–12 Heineken Cup round 4 fixture on 18 December 2011.

Earls also started against Castres on 14 January 2012. He also started in Munster's 51–26 win against Northampton Saints on 21 January 2012. Earls started in Munster's 2011–12 Heineken Cup quarter-final loss to Ulster on 8 April 2012. He also started for Munster in their 45–10 defeat against Ospreys in the semi-final of the 2011–12 Pro12. Earls started against Saracens on 8 December 2012.

=== 2013–2023 ===
Earls started against Edinburgh on 13 January 2013. Earls started against Racing 92 on 20 January 2013. Earls started Munster's 16–10 2012–13 Heineken Cup semi-final defeat against Clermont Auvergne on 27 April 2013.

Earls scored a try in Munster's 19–15 victory against Leinster on 5 October 2013. He started in the 29–23 loss to Edinburgh in round 1 of the 2013–14 Heineken Cup on 12 October 2013. He also started the 26–10 win against Gloucester in round 2 on 19 October 2013. He won the Man-of-the-Match award in Munster's round 3 36–8 win against Perpignan on 8 December 2013. Earls also started the reverse fixture away to Perpignan on 14 December 2013. He started the 20–7 away win against Gloucester on 11 January 2013, scoring a try in a win that secured quarter-final qualification. Earls started against Edinburgh in the round 6 fixture on 19 January 2014, but went off injured in the first-half. It was announced on 21 January 2014 that Earls had signed a new two-year contract. After having a scan on the injury he suffered in the Edinburgh game, Earls was ruled out for 6–8 weeks. Earls started in Munster's Heineken Cup quarter-final against Toulouse on 5 April 2014, scoring a try in the 47-23 win. He started in Munster's 24–16 semi-final defeat to Toulon on 27 April 2014.

Earls was ruled out for four months in September 2014 with a knee injury which required surgery. He returned from the injury against Zebre on 10 January 2015. Earls came off the bench against Saracens in round 5 of the 2014–15 European Rugby Champions Cup on 17 January 2015, winning his 100th cap for Munster. He started against Sale Sharks on 25 January 2015, scoring a try in the 65–10 win. Earls scored a try and won the Man-of-the-Match award in Munster's 22–10 win against Glasgow Warriors on 28 February 2015. He scored a try in Munster's 42–20 win against Connacht on 28 March 2015. Earls scored a try in the 34–3 away win against Edinburgh on 11 April 2015.

Earls started the opening pool game of the 2015–16 European Rugby Champions Cup against Benetton on 14 November 2015. He started against Leicester Tigers in the Champions Cup on 12 December 2015. In January 2016, Earls signed a new three-year contract with Munster and the IRFU. On 22 October 2016, Earls was sent-off in Munster's 38–17 win against Glasgow Warriors in round 2 of the 2016–17 European Rugby Champions Cup. He was subsequently banned for two weeks. On 7 January 2017, Earls won his 50th cap in the European Cup during Munster's 32–7 away win against Racing 92. Earls scored two tries in Munster's 23–17 defeat at the hands of Leinster in the 2017–18 Pro14 on 7 October 2017. He scored a try and earned the Man-of-the-Match award in Munster's 48–3 win against Castres on 21 January 2018, a win that secured a home quarter-final in the 2017–18 European Rugby Champions Cup.

A knee injury sustained during the Six Nations with Ireland ruled Earls out for 6 weeks. He won his 150th cap for Munster in the provinces 27–22 Champions Cup semi-final defeat at the hands of Racing 92 on 22 April 2018. Earls was named the 2018 Munster Rugby Player of the Year in April 2018, having previously been nominated for the same award in 2010. Earls was also the Munster Academy Player of the Year and Young Player of the Year in 2007 and 2009 respectively, making him the first Munster player to win all three awards. He scored a try and won the Man-of-the-Match award in Munster's 20–16 win against Edinburgh on 5 May 2018, a win that saw Munster progress to the semi-finals of the 2017–18 Pro14.

In his first appearance of the 2018–19 season on 29 September 2018, Earls scored a try in Munster's 64–7 win against Ulster in round 5 of the 2018–19 Pro14. Earls signed a contract extension with Munster and the IRFU in October 2018. He scored a hat-trick of tries in Munster's 44–14 win against Edinburgh on 30 November 2018. Earls scored two tries, the latter the match-winner, in Munster 17–13 win against Edinburgh in their 2018–19 European Rugby Champions Cup quarter-final on 30 March 2019.

Earls signed a one-year contract extension with the IRFU in March 2021, and scored two tries in Munster's 40–33 home defeat against Toulouse in the last 16 of the 2020–21 Champions Cup on 3 April 2021. Earls signed a contract extension with Munster and the IRFU until the end of the 2023 Rugby World Cup in May 2022. Having suffered a thigh injury minutes into his first appearance of the season for Munster in September 2022, Earls returned after 11 weeks out as a replacement in Munster's 18–13 defeat at home against Toulouse in round one of the 2022–23 Champions Cup on 11 December 2022.

Earls earned his 200th cap for Munster in their 22–22 draw away to South African the Sharks in round 18 of the 2022–23 United Rugby Championship on 22 April 2023, becoming the fourteenth player to do so for the province. He came on as a replacement in Munster's 19–14 win against the Stormers in the final of the 2022–23 United Rugby Championship on 27 May 2023. Following Ireland's exit from the 2023 Rugby World Cup on 14 October, Earls, whose contract with the IRFU expired after the tournament, confirmed his retirement from rugby.

== Ireland ==
=== 2008–2013 ===
Earls made his debut for Ireland in November 2008 against Canada in Thomond Park. He scored his first international try with his first touch of the ball. Earls was selected in Ireland's squad for the 2009 November Tests. He came on for the injured Luke Fitzgerald against Australia and started against Fiji, a game in which he scored two tries, and South Africa. He played in all 5 of Ireland's 2010 Six Nations Championship games, starting 4 of them. He scored a try against England and scored two more against Wales, finishing as joint top try scorer with Tommy Bowe, Shane Williams and James Hook.

Earls was selected in Ireland's squad for their 2010 tour of New Zealand and Australia, though he had to pull out of the squad due to a groin injury. He was in the Ireland squad for the 2010 Autumn Tests, coming on against South Africa, New Zealand and Argentina. He started every game for Ireland during the 2011 Six Nations Championship, four on the left-wing and one at fullback.

Earls was selected in Ireland's squad for the 2011 Rugby World Cup warm-ups in August, playing in both tests against France. He was selected in Ireland's final 30-man squad for the World Cup in New Zealand. He started on the wing against the United States in Ireland's first Pool C game, and again against Australia during their historic 15–6 victory over the Wallabies. He was switched to outside-centre against Russia and scored two tries. He returned to the left-wing for Ireland's final Pool C game against Italy and, on his birthday, scored a brace of tries in the 36-6 win. He scored his fifth World Cup try in Ireland's quarter-final defeat at the hands of Wales. This total of five tries made him Ireland's top try scorer at the 2011 Rugby World Cup.

Earls was selected in Ireland's 24-man squad for the 2012 Six Nations Championship. He was named in the team to face Wales in the opening fixture, but had to withdraw from the team when his recently born daughter was taken ill. His place at outside centre was taken by Fergus McFadden. He returned to the Ireland team for their game against Italy, scoring a try, and played against France, Scotland and England.

Earls played at inside centre for Ireland in the first test against New Zealand on 9 June 2012, as part of a new centre-combination with Brian O'Driscoll. Earls missed the second test due to a pectoral injury, but returned to start the third test, this time on the left-wing. Earls started at 13 for Ireland in the opening 2012 Guinness Series test against South Africa on 10 November 2012, and again against Argentina on 24 November 2012.

Earls was named in Ireland squad for the 2013 Six Nations Championship on 17 January 2013, and came off the bench against Wales in Ireland's opening 30–22 win, and their 12–6 defeat against England on 10 February 2013. He came into the starting XV against Scotland after Simon Zebo's injury, starting in his place on the left-wing. He continued there in the 13–13 draw against France. He started against Italy in the final game of the tournament, but went off injured in the 24th minute. On 23 October 2013, Earls was named in the Ireland squad for the 2013 Autumn Tests.

=== 2014–2018 ===
Earls was named in the Ireland squad for their 2014 Tour to Argentina on 19 May 2014. However, Earls was ruled out of the tour with a viral infection. Earls started for Ireland Wolfhounds in their game against England Saxons on 30 January 2015. He was named in the Ireland squad for the opening rounds of the 2015 Six Nations Championship on 1 February 2015.

Earls was named in the 45-man training squad for the 2015 Rugby World Cup on 24 June 2015. He started in the first World Cup warm-up against Wales on 8 August 2015, scoring a try and earning the Man-of-the-Match award in the 35–21 win for Ireland. He started the warm-up game against Wales on 29 August 2015. Earls was selected in the final 31-man squad for the World Cup when it was announced on 1 September 2015. He started the opening pool game against Canada on 19 September 2015. Earls started the second pool game against Romania on 27 September 2015, scoring two tries and earning the Man-of-the-Match award in Ireland's 44–10 win. He started the third pool game against Italy on 4 October 2015, scoring Ireland's only try in their 16–9 win and, in doing so, overtaking Brian O'Driscoll as Ireland's leading try-scorer in Rugby World Cup history. Earls started Ireland's 24–9 win against France on 11 October 2015. He started for Ireland in the 43–20 quarter-final defeat against Argentina on 18 October 2015.

On 20 January 2016, Earls was named in Ireland's 35-man squad for the 2016 Six Nations Championship. On 7 February 2016, he started against Wales in Ireland's opening match of the Six Nations. He missed the game against France on 13 February, but returned to start for Ireland against England, Italy and Scotland. On 25 May 2016, Earls was named in the 32-man Ireland squad to tour South Africa in a 3-test series. On 11 June 2016, Earls started in Ireland's historic first test win against South Africa in South Africa. He missed the second test defeat, but returned to the starting XV for the third test, which Ireland lost 19–13. On 26 October 2016, Earls was named in Ireland's squad for the 2016 end-of-year rugby union internationals. However, his two-week suspension as a result of the red card he received against Glasgow Warriors meant that Earls missed Ireland's historic first ever victory against New Zealand in Soldier Field, Chicago on 5 November 2016. He returned to the Ireland team for their 55–21 victory against Canada, scoring a try, and also scored a try in the 27–24 win against Australia.

On 23 January 2017, Earls was named in the Ireland squad for the opening two rounds of the 2017 Six Nations Championship. In Ireland's opening fixture of the tournament against Scotland on 4 February, Earls scored a try, though Ireland lost 27–22. On 11 February, Earls scored two tries in Ireland's 63–10 win in the Stadio Olimpico against Italy. He also started against France, Wales and England. He was also selected in the squad for the 2017 Summer Tour against the United States and Japan. On 10 June 2017, in the one-off test against the United States, Earls scored two tries, made three assists and won the Man-of-the-Match award in Ireland's 55–19 win in the Red Bull Arena, New Jersey. On 17 June 2017, Earls again scored two tries, this time in Ireland's 50–22 win against Japan in Shizuoka Stadium, Shizuoka. His tally of nine tries in an international season set a new record for Ireland. He also started the second test against Japan, which Ireland won 35–13 to seal the series victory.

Earls started every game for Ireland as they won a Grand Slam in the 2018 Six Nations Championship, scoring a try against Italy. He won the Players' Player of the Year award at the 2018 Rugby Players Ireland Awards in May of that year, becoming the fourth Munster player in a row to win the award after Paul O'Connell (2015), CJ Stander (2016) and Conor Murray (2017). Earls started in all three tests in Ireland's historic 2–1 series victory against Australia in June 2018. During the 2018 Autumn Tests, Earls started in Ireland's 28–17 win against Argentina on 10 November, and in their 16–9 win against New Zealand on 17 November, a win that was Earls' first against the All Blacks and Ireland's first ever win in Dublin against New Zealand.

=== 2019–2023 ===
Earls was ever-present for Ireland during the 2019 Six Nations Championship, starting in the 32–20 opening defeat against England, the 22–13 win against Scotland, the 26–16 win against Italy, the 26–14 win against France and the 25–7 defeat against Wales in the final round, a victory that saw the Welsh win the grand slam.

Earls was selected in the 31-man Ireland squad for the 2019 Rugby World Cup, despite injury preventing Earls from featuring in the first three warm-up matches. During the World Cup itself, Earls started in Ireland's shock 19–12 defeat against hosts Japan, the 35–0 win against Russia, the 47–5 win against Samoa in their final pool game, and the comprehensive 46–14 defeat against New Zealand in the quarter-finals, which brought an end to Ireland's 2019 World Cup.

Retained by new head coach Andy Farrell in his squad for the 2020 Six Nations Championship, Earls featured off the bench in Ireland's 24–14 win against defending-champions Wales and their 24–12 defeat against England, before the tournament was suspended due to the COVID-19 pandemic. With the usual format of end-of-year international tests not possible due to the COVID-19 pandemic, Ireland instead participated in the Autumn Nations Cup. Earls was a replacement in Ireland's 32–9 opening win against Wales on 13 November, and started in the 18–7 defeat against England on 21 November, the 23–10 win against Georgia on 29 November, and the 31–16 win against Scotland on 5 December, which secured a third-place finish for Ireland in the tournament.

Earls was again ever-present for Ireland during the 2021 Six Nations Championship, starting in their 21–16 away defeat against Wales in their opening fixture of the 2021 Six Nations Championship on 7 February 2021 and the 15–13 home defeat against France, featuring as a replacement in the 48–10 away win against Italy, then returning to the starting XV for the 27–24 away win against Scotland and the 32–18 win against England in the final round. During the 2021 Autumn Nations Series, Earls featured as a replacement in Ireland's 60–5 win against Japan on 6 November, in the famous 29–20 win against New Zealand on 13 November, and in the 53–7 win against Argentina in Ireland's final fixture of the series on 21 November.

Earls missed the 2022 Six Nations Championship due to a thigh injury, but, having returned from that injury with Munster, Earls was selected in the squad for the 2022 Ireland rugby union tour of New Zealand, and started in the uncapped match against the Māori All Blacks on 29 June, which ended in a 32–17 defeat for Ireland, before also starting in the first test against New Zealand on 2 July, scoring a try in Ireland's 42–19 defeat. Earls captained Ireland for the first time in their second uncapped match against the Māori All Blacks on 12 July, which Ireland won 30–24 to draw the series 1–1, before featuring off the bench in the 32–22 win against New Zealand in the third test on 16 July that secured a historic 2–1 series victory for Ireland, their first ever in New Zealand.

Earls missed Ireland's 2022 Autumn Nations Series due to a thigh injury and also missed the 2023 Six Nations Championship due to a calf injury, but returned for Ireland in their 33–17 win against Italy on 5 August in both nations' first 2023 Rugby World Cup warm-up match, and earned his 100th cap for Ireland in their second warm-up match on 19 August, scoring one try in their 29–10 win against England having replaced James Lowe during the second-half. Earls was selected in Ireland's 33-man squad for the 2023 Rugby World Cup, and started in their opening 82–8 win against Romania on 9 September. After Ireland's exit in the quarter-finals, Earls announced his retirement along with teammate Johnny Sexton.

== British & Irish Lions ==
On 21 April 2009, Earls was selected as part of the 2009 British & Irish Lions tour to South Africa. He made his Lions debut on 30 May 2009, in a nervy, error-strewn performance against a South African Royal XV. A week later, against Currie Cup outfit the Free State Cheetahs, he put in a far improved showing, scoring an impressive try which ultimately proved crucial to the result, with the Lions coming through to win 26–24. On 23 June 2009, he scored a try from fullback in a tour match against the Emerging Springboks. On receiving the ball at the out half position and stepping past three rushing defenders, he touched down for the Lions' only try in a 13–13 draw. Earls also played against Western Province and Southern Kings in mid-week games, but he did not win any full Lions caps on the tour.

== Personal life ==
Earls and his long-time partner, Edel McGee, married in Quilty, County Clare on 1 July 2016. Together they have three daughters, Ella-May, Laurie and Emie. Earls released his autobiography - Fight or Flight: My Life, My Choices - in October 2021. In the same month, during an appearance on The Late Late Show, Earls revealed he had been diagnosed with Bipolar II disorder eight years previously and opened up about his mental health struggles, with then-Munster head coach Johann van Graan, amongst others, heaping praise upon Earls for his honesty and bravery. The book was met with widespread praise, and won Sports Book of the Year at the Irish Book Awards.

== Statistics ==
=== International tries ===
Try	Opposing team	Location	Venue	Competition	Date	Result
1	Canada	Limerick	Thomond Park	2008 November Tests	8 November 2008	Won
2	Fiji	Dublin	RDS Arena	2009 November Tests	21 November 2009	Won
3	Fiji	Dublin	RDS Arena	2009 November Tests	21 November 2009	Won
4	England	London	Twickenham	2010 Six Nations	27 February 2010	Won
5	Wales	Dublin	Croke Park	2010 Six Nations	13 March 2010	Won
6	Wales	Dublin	Croke Park	2010 Six Nations	13 March 2010	Won
7	Russia	Rotorua	International Stadium	2011 Rugby World Cup	25 September 2011	Won
8	Russia	Rotorua	International Stadium	2011 Rugby World Cup	25 September 2011	Won
9	Italy	Dunedin	Forsyth Barr Stadium	2011 Rugby World Cup	2 October 2011	Won
10	Italy	Dunedin	Forsyth Barr Stadium	2011 Rugby World Cup	2 October 2011	Won
11	Wales	Wellington	Westpac Stadium	2011 Rugby World Cup	8 October 2011	Lost
12	Italy	Dublin	Aviva Stadium	2012 Six Nations	25 February 2012	Won
13	Wales	Cardiff	Millennium Stadium	2015 RWC warm-up	8 August 2015	Won
14	Romania	London	Wembley Stadium	2015 Rugby World Cup	27 September 2015	Won
15	Romania	London	Wembley Stadium	2015 Rugby World Cup	27 September 2015	Won
16	Italy	London	Olympic Stadium	2015 Rugby World Cup	4 October 2015	Won
17	Scotland	Dublin	Aviva Stadium	2016 Six Nations	19 March 2016	Won
18	Canada	Dublin	Aviva Stadium	2016 November Tests	12 November 2016	Won
19	Australia	Dublin	Aviva Stadium	2016 November Tests	26 November 2016	Won
20	Scotland	Edinburgh	Murrayfield	2017 Six Nations	4 February 2017	Lost
21	Italy	Rome	Stadio Olimpico	2017 Six Nations	11 February 2017	Won
22	Italy	Rome	Stadio Olimpico	2017 Six Nations	11 February 2017	Won
23	United States	New Jersey	Red Bull Arena	2017 Ireland tour	10 June 2017	Won
24	United States	New Jersey	Red Bull Arena	2017 Ireland tour	10 June 2017	Won
25	Japan	Shizuoka	Shizuoka Stadium	2017 Ireland tour	17 June 2017	Won
26	Japan	Shizuoka	Shizuoka Stadium	2017 Ireland tour	17 June 2017	Won
27	Italy	Dublin	Aviva Stadium	2018 Six Nations	10 February 2018	Won
28	Scotland	Edinburgh	Murrayfield	2019 Six Nations	9 February 2019	Won
29	Italy	Rome	Stadio Olimpico	2019 Six Nations	24 February 2019	Won
30	France	Dublin	Aviva Stadium	2019 Six Nations	10 March 2019	Won
31	Scotland	Dublin	Aviva Stadium	Autumn Nations Cup	5 December 2020	Won
32	Scotland	Dublin	Aviva Stadium	Autumn Nations Cup	5 December 2020	Won
33	Italy	Rome	Stadio Olimpico	2021 Six Nations	27 February 2021	Won
34	England	Dublin	Aviva Stadium	2021 Six Nations	20 March 2021	Won
35	New Zealand	Auckland	Eden Park	2022 Ireland tour	2 July 2022	Lost
36	England	Dublin	Aviva Stadium	2023 RWC warm-up	19 August 2023	Won

=== International analysis by opposition ===
Against	Played	Won	Lost	Drawn	Tries	Points	% Won
Argentina	5	4	1	0	0	0	80
Australia	6	4	1	1	1	5	66.67
Canada	3	3	0	0	2	10	100
England	13	6	7	0	3	15	46.15
Fiji	1	1	0	0	2	10	100
France	11	4	5	2	1	5	36.36
Georgia	1	1	0	0	0	0	100
Italy	12	11	1	0	9	45	91.67
Japan	4	3	1	0	2	10	75
New Zealand	9	3	6	0	1	5	33.33
Romania	2	2	0	0	2	10	100
Russia	2	2	0	0	2	10	100
Samoa	1	1	0	0	0	0	100
Scotland	10	7	3	0	5	25	70
South Africa	5	2	3	0	0	0	40
United States	2	2	0	0	2	10	100
Wales	14	7	6	1	4	20	50
Total	101	63	34	4	36	180	62.38

Correct as of 9 September 2023

== Honours ==
=== Individual ===
- Munster Rugby John McCarthy Award for Academy Player of the Year:
  - Winner (1): 2007
- Munster Rugby Young Player of the Year:
  - Winner (1): 2009
- Munster Rugby Player of the Year:
  - Winner (1): 2018
- Rugby Players Ireland Players' Player of the Year:
  - Winner (1): 2018

=== St Munchin's College ===
- Munster Schools Rugby Senior Cup:
  - Winner (1): 2006

=== Munster ===
- United Rugby Championship:
  - Winner (3): 2008–09, 2010–11, 2022–23
- European Rugby Champions Cup:
  - Winner (1): 2007–08

=== Ireland ===
- Six Nations Championship:
  - Winner (1): 2018
- Grand Slam:
  - Winner (1): 2018
- Triple Crown:
  - Winner (1): 2018

=== British & Irish Lions ===
- British & Irish Lions tours:
  - Tourist (1): 2009
