= Peter Stringer =

Irish rugby union player (born 1977)

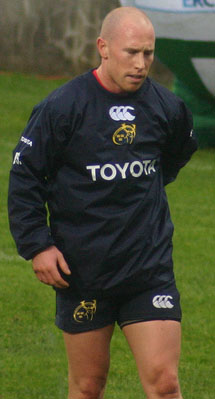
- Stringer warming up with Munster.
- Born: Peter Alexander Stringer; 13 December 1977 (age 48) Cork, Ireland
- Height: 1.71 m (5 ft 7 1/2 in)
- Weight: 73 kg (11.5 st; 161 lb)
- School: Presentation Brothers College

Rugby union career
- Position: Scrum-half
Amateur team(s)
Years	Team	Apps	(Points)
19??–2013	Shannon		
Senior career
Years	Team	Apps	(Points)
1998–2013	Munster	230	(55)
2011–2012	→ Saracens (loan)	11	(5)
2012	→ Newcastle Falcons (loan)	5	(5)
2013–2015	Bath	62	(25)
2015–2017	Sale Sharks	39	(0)
2017–2018	Worcester Warriors	6	(0)
- Correct as of 20 July 2017
International career
Years	Team	Apps	(Points)
2000–2011	Ireland	98	(30)
2009–2010	Ireland Wolfhounds	3	(0)
2000–2011	Barbarians	2	(0)
- Correct as of 14 June 2013

Peter Alexander Stringer (born 13 December 1977) is an Irish former rugby union player who played at scrum-half. He played 13 seasons with Irish province Munster from 1998 to 2011; he then played seven seasons from 2011 to 2018 in England with various teams — Saracens, Newcastle Falcons, Bath, Sale Sharks and Worcester Warriors. Internationally, Stringer represented Ireland and the Barbarians. He announced his retirement from rugby in June 2018.

== Club career ==
=== Munster ===
Stringer made his Munster debut against Ulster on 3 October 1998, in an Irish Inter-Provincial Championship game. He made his Heineken Cup debut for Munster against Perpignan on 10 October 1998.

Stringer was Munster's first-choice scrum-half for the 2000 Heineken Cup Final against Northampton Saints, a game which Munster lost 8–9. Stringer was again at scrum-half for Munster in the 2002 Heineken Cup Final against Leicester Tigers, which Leicester won 15–9. This game also involved the infamous 'Hand of Back' incident, in which Neil Back, the Leicester flanker, knocked the ball out of Stringer's hands during his put-in to a Munster scrum near the Leicester try-line, ultimately denying Munster any chance of a comeback .

Stringer's first silverware with Munster came in February 2003, when they secured the 2002–03 Celtic League. He was also Munster's scrum-half when they beat Llanelli Scarlets to win the Celtic Cup in May 2005.

Stringer played a key role for Munster during the 2005–06 Heineken Cup, helping the team reach their third final. Before the 2006 Heineken Cup Final, Stringer was criticised for not scoring enough tries. During the final, he saw that Biarritz's scrum-half, Dimitri Yachvili, was out of position, and Stringer quickly scored Munster's second try , helping to secure a 23–19 win, and Munster's first European Cup.

During the 2007–08 Heineken Cup, Stringer lost his place in the Munster team to Tomás O'Leary. He was on the bench for Munster's 16–13 win over Toulouse in the 2008 Heineken Cup Final, but did not come on.

Stringer was part of the Munster team that won the 2008–09 Celtic League, and was on the bench when Munster won the 2011 Celtic League Grand Final, beating rivals and newly crowned Heineken Cup Champions Leinster 19–9 in Thomond Park.

During the 2010–11 season, Stringer also became Munster's most capped player ever, overtaking the record previously held by Alan Quinlan. He achieved the feat when he came on as a substitute in Munster's Celtic League victory against Leinster on 2 April 2011.

On 27 March 2012, while still on loan with Newcastle, Stringer signed a deal to extend his Munster contract by one year.

==== Loan to Saracens ====
On 3 December 2011, it was announced that Stringer would join Aviva Premiership side Saracens on a three-month loan. He officially joined up with Saracens on 5 December 2011. He made his debut for Saracens in their Heineken Cup pool fixture against Ospreys on 10 December 2011. Stringer made his first appearance in the Aviva Premiership for Saracens against Harlequins on 27 December 2011. He scored his first try for the club in the Anglo-Welsh Cup game against Worcester Warriors on 29 January 2012. Stringer's last game for Saracens was against Northampton Saints on 4 March 2012.

==== Loan to Newcastle ====
Munster confirmed on 23 February 2012 that Stringer would join another Aviva Premiership side, Newcastle Falcons, on loan immediately after the conclusion of his loan at Saracens, and would be there until the end of the 2011–12 season. He joined up with the club officially on 13 March 2012. Stringer made his debut for Newcastle on 23 March 2012, against Worcester Warriors in the Aviva Premiership. He scored his first try for Newcastle in his last game for the club, during the relegation-decider against London Wasps, which Newcastle won 14–10.

=== Bath ===
It was announced on 21 January 2013 that Stringer would return to the Aviva Premiership for a third time, this time on loan with Bath Rugby as cover for injured first-choice scrum-half Michael Claassens. He scored two tries on his debut with Bath. Stringer agreed an extension to his loan deal with Bath in March 2013, which saw him stay with the side until the end of the 2012–13 season. It was announced on 9 April 2013 that Stringer had signed a one-year contract with Bath, which saw him join the club as a full-time player from the 2013–14 season. Stringer signed a new one-year contract with Bath in March 2014.

=== Sale Sharks ===
On 19 May 2015, it was announced Stringer had signed a one-year deal with Sale Sharks. In February 2016, Stringer signed a one-year contract extension with Sale. In April 2016, Stringer was named the Sale Sharks Player of the Year for the 2015–16 season. At the end of the 2016–17 season, Sale announced that Stringer would be leaving the club, while Stringer himself declared his intention to continue playing professional rugby.

=== Worcester Warriors ===
On 20 July 2017, Worcester Warriors announced that they had signed Stringer on a six-month contract to cover Francois Hougaard while he is on international duty. The contract meant Stringer would be playing professional rugby as a 40-year-old and would join his longtime Munster and Ireland teammate Donncha O'Callaghan at the club.

== International career ==
=== Ireland ===
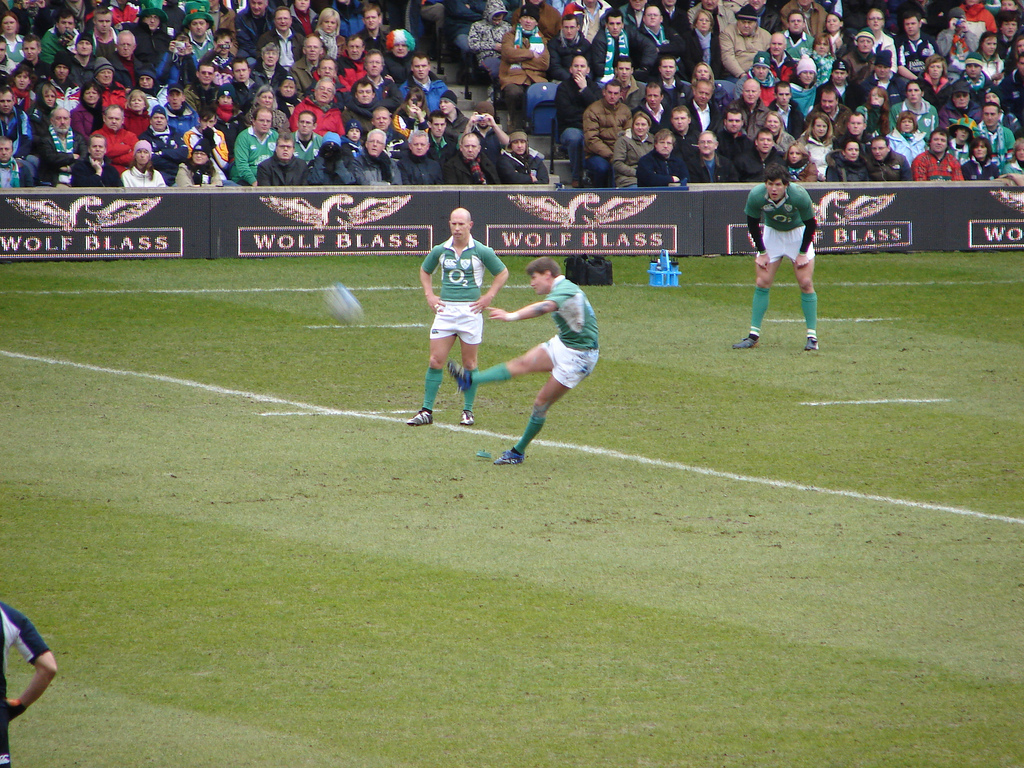
Stringer watches over a Ronan O'Gara kick against Scotland

Stringer debuted for Ireland against Scotland in February in the 2000 Six Nations Championship. Between then and 2006, he appeared in 76 out of Ireland's 85 matches. Stringer quickly became known for his ability to take down larger players, especially with one handed "Ankle taps" , and game changing moments.

Stringer was part of the Ireland teams that won the Six Nations Triple Crown in 2004, 2006, and 2007. Stringer, having lost his starting role to Eoin Reddan, played in three of Ireland's five matches in the 2008 Six Nations coming off the bench as a substitute in each one.

On 14 March 2009, Stringer put in a Man-of-the-Match performance for Ireland against Scotland during the 2009 Six Nations Championship. Losing 12–9 at half-time in Murrayfield, Stringer made a break and passed to Jamie Heaslip, who scored a match-turning try that eventually saw Ireland win 15–22. A week later, Stringer came off the bench during Ireland's final 2009 Six Nations game against Wales. In the dying minutes of the game, Stringer passed the ball from a ruck to Ronan O'Gara, who then scored the drop-goal that won Ireland's first Grand Slam since 1948.

Stringer was selected in Ireland's squad for the 2003 Rugby World Cup, and played in all five of Ireland's games at the tournament. He was also in the 2007 Rugby World Cup squad, but played only in the first two pool games, before being replaced by Eoin Reddan took over the starting scrum-half role for Ireland for the remainder of the tournament. Stringer was included in Ireland's squad for the 2011 Rugby World Cup warm-ups in August, but did not feature in any of the warm-up tests and was not selected in the final 30-man squad for the World Cup in New Zealand, as Murray, Reddan, and Boss were Ireland's scrum-halves selected. His last matches for Ireland came in the 2011 Six Nations Championship where he came off the bench as a substitute behind Reddan; Stringer's last match in a 24–8 win against England on 19 March.

=== Barbarians ===
On 12 August 2000, Stringer played for the Barbarians against Germany. He was invited to play for the side again, this time playing against Australia on 26 November 2011.

== Personal life ==
Stringer married Debbie O’Leary in the Nuestra Señora de la Encarnación Church in Plaza de la Iglesia in the old town of Marbella, Spain, on 9 June 2015. The couple welcomed their first child, a son named Noah, in April 2017. The couple's second son, Oscar, was born in March 2020.

== Statistics ==
=== International analysis by opposition ===
Against	Played	Won	Lost	Drawn	Tries	Points	% Won
Argentina	5	4	1	0	0	0	80
Australia	7	2	5	0	0	0	28.57
Canada	3	2	0	1	0	0	66.67
England	10	7	3	0	0	0	70
France	8	3	5	0	0	0	37.5
Georgia	2	2	0	0	0	0	100
Italy	11	11	0	0	2	10	100
Japan	3	3	0	0	1	5	100
Namibia	2	2	0	0	0	0	100
New Zealand	8	0	8	0	0	0	0
Pacific Islanders	1	1	0	0	0	0	100
Romania	4	4	0	0	0	0	100
Russia	1	1	0	0	0	0	100
Samoa	2	2	0	0	0	0	100
Scotland	12	11	1	0	1	5	91.67
South Africa	6	2	4	0	0	0	33.33
United States	2	2	0	0	1	5	100
Wales	11	8	3	0	1	5	72.73
Total	98	67	30	1	6	30	63.16

Correct as of 5 July 2017

== See also ==
- List of rugby union test caps leaders
