= Tony McGahan =

- Born: Tony McGahan; 1972 (age 53–54)

Rugby union career
- Position: Assistant Coach Queensland Reds
Coaching career
- Years: Team
- 2008–2012: Munster
- 2013–2017: Melbourne Rebels
- 2018–: Queensland Reds (Assistant)

Tony McGahan is an Australian rugby union coach who is currently Head of Sport at St. Joseph's College, Gregory Terrace and a former assistant coach at the Queensland Reds.

== Early career ==
Born in Queensland, Australia, a teacher by profession, a BE in Physical Education from Queensland University of Technology, he played Rugby Union (inside centre) with Queensland Schoolboys and Eastern Districts and Rugby League with Queensland U16s/19s, Australian Universities.

== Munster ==
In July 2008, McGahan took up the position as the director of coaching of Munster following Declan Kidney's departure to take over as Ireland coach. He had been involved with the Munster team since 2005 as the defence and backs coach.

In May 2011 he coached Munster to win the 2010–11 Celtic League Grand Final against Leinster at Thomond Park.

McGahan left Munster at the end of the 2011–12 season, to take up a role as Australian defence coach.

== Australia ==
McGahan took up the role of coaching co-ordinator of Australia after leaving Munster at the end of the 2011–12 European domestic season.

He became coach of the Melbourne Rebels at the end of the 2013 Super Rugby season.

Preceded by Declan Kidney	Munster Rugby coach 2008–12	Succeeded by Rob Penney
