= 2010–11 Celtic League =

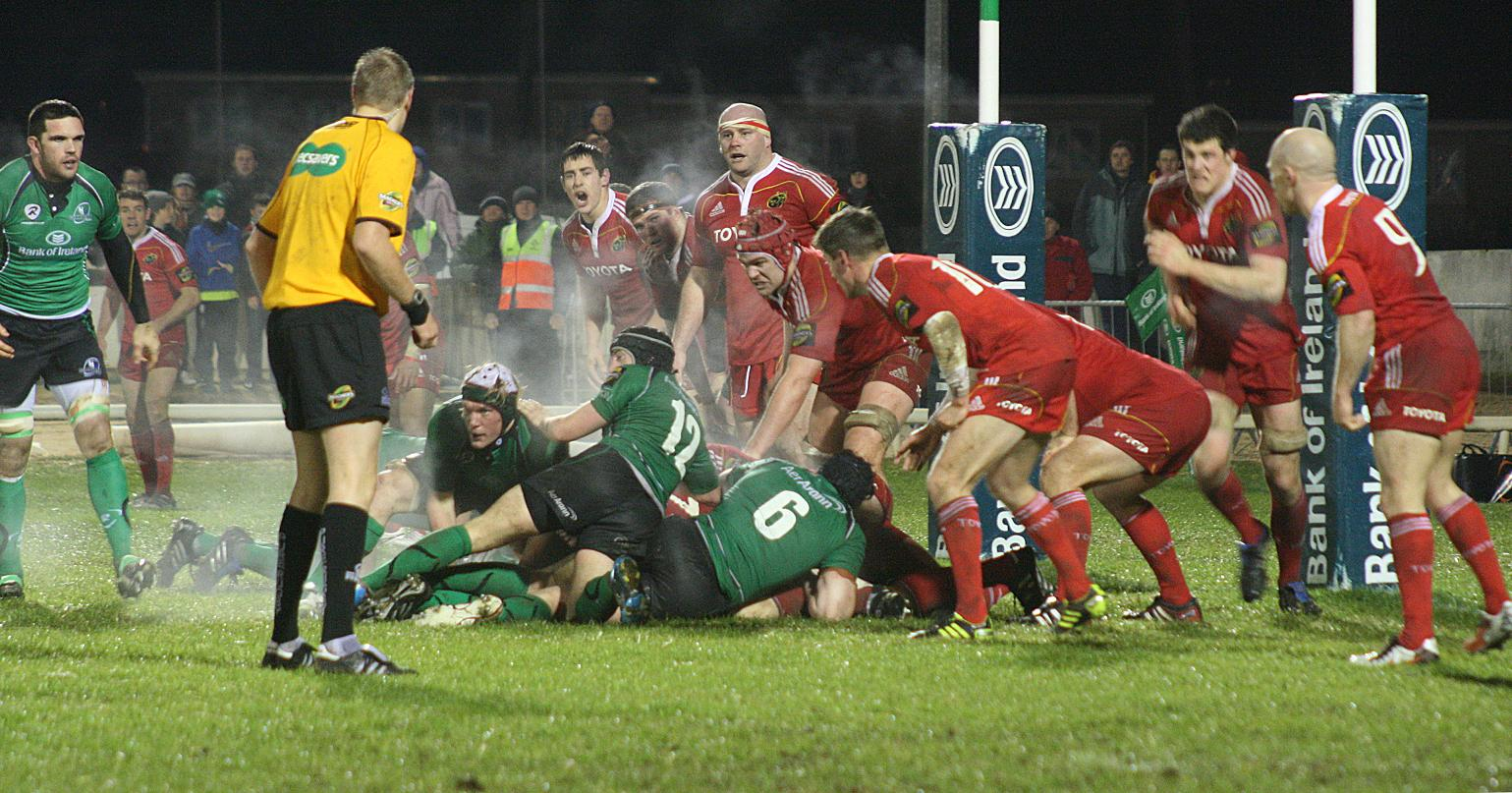
- Connacht vs. Munster, 27 December 2010
- Countries: Ireland; Italy; Scotland; Wales
- Date: 3 September 2010 – 28 May 2011
- Champions: (Ireland) Munster (3rd title)
- Runners-up: (Ireland) Leinster
- Matches played: 135
- Attendance: 1,019,634 (average 7,553 per match)
- Tries scored: 489 (average 3.6 per match)
- Top point scorer: Dan Biggar (Ospreys) (248 points)
- Top try scorer: Tim Visser (Edinburgh) (14 tries)

Official website
- www.rabodirectpro12.com

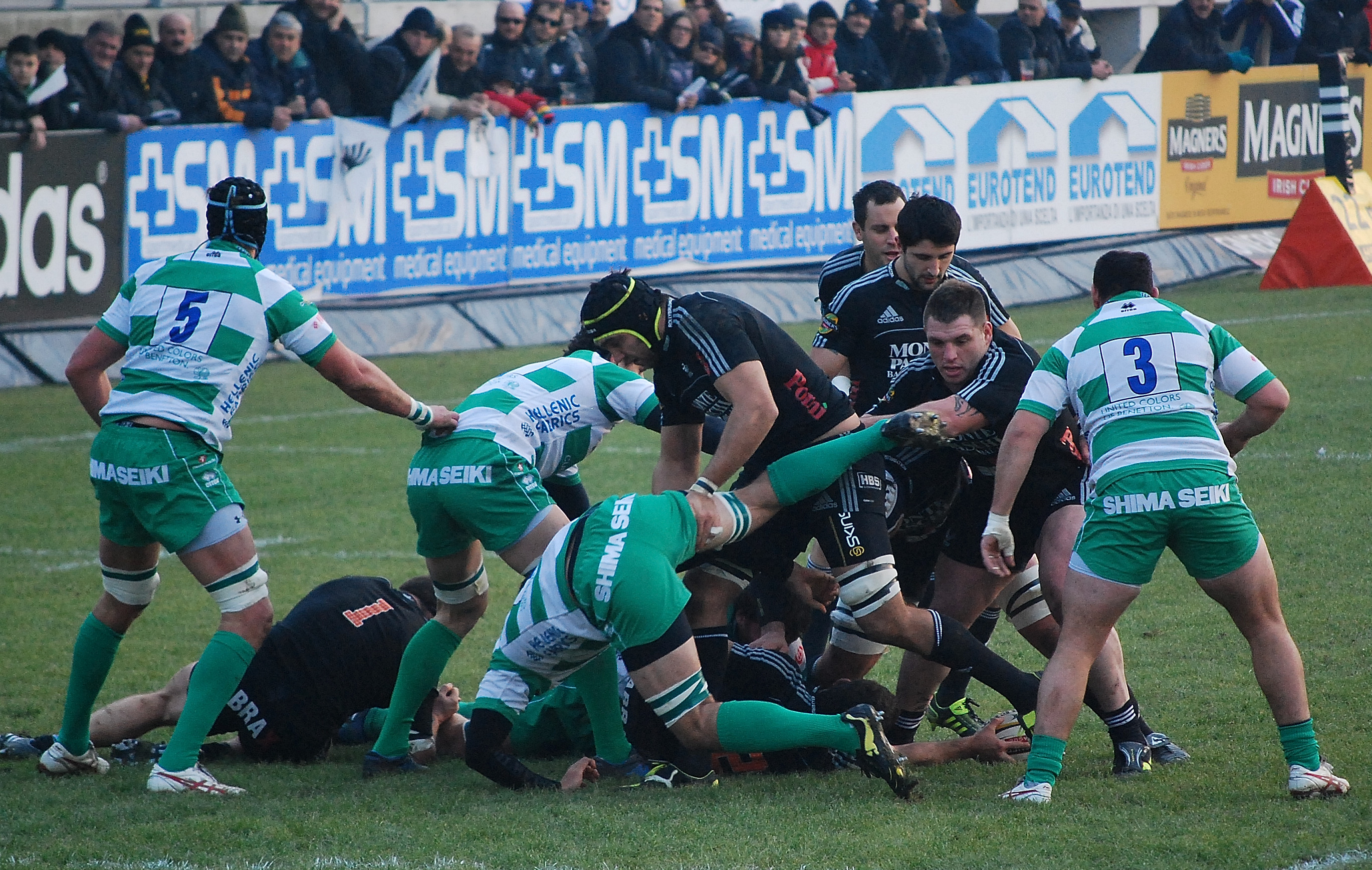
Stadio Zaffanella, Aironi vs Treviso - panoramio

The 2010–11 Magners League was the tenth Celtic League season and the fifth with Magners as title sponsor. The regular season began on 3 September 2010 and finished on the weekend of 6–8 May 2011. During these stages, each team played every other team both home and away and were awarded points according to the standard bonus point system. This was the second season to follow the play-off structure to determine the Magners League champion, with the top four teams qualifying for the semi-finals. The winner of each semi final advanced to the Grand Final, which took place 28 May and was hosted by the team that finished highest in the table following the regular season. The title was won by Munster who defeated Leinster by 19–9 at Thomond Park.

This was the final season of the Celtic League sponsored by Magners. The following season would see RaboDirect, the Irish subsidiary of Dutch financial company Rabobank, take over the sponsorship. At the same time, the league rebranded itself as Pro12.

The twelve teams competing were the four Irish provinces, Munster, Leinster, Connacht and Ulster; two Scottish regions, Edinburgh Rugby and Glasgow Warriors; four Welsh regions, Cardiff Blues, Newport Gwent Dragons, Ospreys and Scarlets; and two new Italian entries Aironi and Benetton Treviso

In May 2010, the Ospreys were fined £100,000 and docked 4 points from the 2010–11 season following their postponement of the away fixture at Ulster in the 2009–10 season. However, in September 2010, following an appeal by the Ospreys, the four point deduction for the 2010–11 season was overturned, although the £100,000 fine was upheld. Instead, the four point deduction was suspended for two years.

A new broadcast deal saw games broadcast live on terrestrial television channels in Scotland and Ireland in addition to the established terrestrial coverage in Wales. The deal will be in place until the 2013–14 season.

== Teams ==
Location of 2010–11 Celtic League teams in Great Britain and Ireland.	Location of 2010–11 Celtic League teams in Italy
Winners; 2nd–4th place; Other teams.

Team	Coach	Captain	Stadium	Capacity
(Italy) Aironi	(Italy) Franco Bernini	(Italy) Quintin Geldenhuys	Stadio Luigi Zaffanella	5,000
(Italy) Benetton Treviso	(South Africa) Franco Smith	(Italy) Antonio Pavanello	Stadio Comunale di Monigo	6,700
(Wales) Cardiff Blues	(Wales) Dai Young	(New Zealand) Paul Tito	Cardiff City Stadium	26,828
(Ireland) Connacht	(Ireland) Eric Elwood	(Ireland) John Muldoon	Galway Sportsgrounds	7,000
(Scotland) Edinburgh	(Scotland) Rob Moffat	(Scotland) Roddy Grant	Murrayfield Stadium	67,144 (Note: Although Murrayfield's full capacity is 67,144, only the lower section of the West Stand, with a capacity of 12,464, is generally opened for Edinburgh fixtures.)
(Scotland) Glasgow Warriors	(Scotland) Sean Lineen	(Scotland) Alastair Kellock	Firhill Stadium	10,887
(Ireland) Leinster	(New Zealand) Josef Schmidt	(Ireland) Leo Cullen	RDS Arena; Aviva Stadium	18,500; 51,700
(Ireland) Munster	(Australia) Tony McGahan	(Ireland) Paul O'Connell	Thomond Park; Musgrave Park	26,500; 8,300
(Wales) Newport Gwent Dragons	(Wales) Paul Turner	(New Zealand) Tom Willis	Rodney Parade	11,676
(Wales) Ospreys	(Australia) Scott Johnson	(Wales) Alun Wyn Jones	Liberty Stadium	20,532
(Wales) Scarlets	(Wales) Nigel Davies	(Wales) Matthew Rees	Parc y Scarlets	14,870
(Ireland) Ulster	(Ireland) Brian McLaughlin	(Ireland) Rory Best	Ravenhill	12,300

== Table ==
	Team	Pld	W	D	L	PF	PA	PD	TF	TA	Try bonus	Losing bonus	Pts
1	(Ireland) Munster	22	19	0	3	496	327	+169	44	22	5	2	83
2	(Ireland) Leinster	22	15	1	6	495	336	+159	50	25	5	3	70
3	(Ireland) Ulster	22	15	1	6	480	418	+62	44	35	3	2	67
4	(Wales) Ospreys	22	12	1	9	553	418	+135	56	29	6	7	63
5	(Wales) Scarlets	22	12	1	9	503	453	+50	49	43	5	7	62
6	(Wales) Cardiff Blues	22	13	1	8	479	392	+87	37	33	3	3	60
7	(Wales) Newport Gwent Dragons	22	10	1	11	444	462	−18	47	49	3	4	49
8	(Scotland) Edinburgh	22	9	0	13	421	460	−39	39	44	2	5	43
9	(Ireland) Connacht	22	7	1	14	394	459	−65	32	44	3	6	39
10	(Italy) Benetton Treviso	22	9	0	13	374	502	−128	29	58	0	2	38
11	(Scotland) Glasgow Warriors	22	6	1	15	401	543	−142	33	48	1	6	33
12	(Italy) Aironi	22	1	0	21	247	517	−270	21	52	0	8	12
Under the standard bonus point system, points are awarded as follows: 4 points for a win; 2 points for a draw; 1 bonus point for scoring 4 tries (or more) (Try bonus); 1 bonus point for losing by 7 points (or fewer) (Losing bonus)
Green background (rows 1 to 4) are play-off places. Correct as of 7 May 2011. Source: RaboDirect PRO12

== Fixtures ==
All times are local.

=== Round 1 ===
3 September 2010
19:05

Glasgow Warriors (Scotland)	22 – 19	(Ireland) Leinster (1 BP)
	Report

Firhill Stadium
Attendance: 2,879
Referee: Tim Hayes

3 September 2010
19:05

Ulster (Ireland)	27 – 26	(Wales) Ospreys (1 BP)
	Report

Ravenhill
Attendance: 7,500
Referee: Peter Allan

4 September 2010
17:30

(1 BP) Connacht (Ireland)	40 – 17	(Wales) Newport Gwent Dragons
	Report

Sportsground
Attendance: 1,371
Referee: James Jones

4 September 2010
18:30

(1 BP) Cardiff Blues (Wales)	34 – 23	(Scotland) Edinburgh
	Report

Cardiff City Stadium
Attendance: 6,542
Referee: Peter Fitzgibbon

4 September 2010
19:05

Benetton Treviso (Italy)	34 – 28	(Wales) Scarlets (1 BP)
	Report

Stadio Comunale di Monigo
Attendance: 5,000
Referee: David Wilkinson

4 September 2010
19:30

(1 BP) Munster (Ireland)	33 – 17	(Italy) Aironi
	Report

Musgrave Park
Attendance: 8,426
Referee: Graham Knox

=== Round 2 ===
10 September 2010
19:05

(1 BP) Edinburgh (Scotland)	13 – 16	(Ireland) Munster
	Report

Murrayfield
Attendance: 3,419
Referee: James Jones

10 September 2010
19:05

(1 BP) Ospreys (Wales)	32 – 16	(Italy) Benetton Treviso
	Report

Liberty Stadium
Attendance: 6,724
Referee: Dudley Phillips

11 September 2010
15:00

(1 BP) Scarlets (Wales)	35 – 33	(Ireland) Connacht (1 BP)
	Report

Parc y Scarlets
Attendance: 6,436
Referee: Neil Paterson

11 September 2010
18:30

(1 BP) Leinster (Ireland)	34 – 23	(Wales) Cardiff Blues
	Report

RDS Arena
Attendance: 15,890
Referee: Andy Macpherson

11 September 2010
19:05

(1 BP) Aironi (Italy)	15 – 22	(Ireland) Ulster
	Report

Stadio Luigi Zaffanella
Attendance: 4,453
Referee: Stefano Penne

12 September 2010
16:10

Newport Gwent Dragons (Wales)	23 – 11	(Scotland) Glasgow Warriors
	Report

Rodney Parade
Attendance: 5,028
Referee: Carlo Damasco

=== Round 3 ===
17 September 2010
19:30

(1 BP) Glasgow Warriors (Scotland)	17 – 19	(Ireland) Connacht
	Report

Firhill Stadium
Attendance: 3,049
Referee: Leighton Hodges

17 September 2010
20:05

(1 BP) Scarlets (Wales)	49 – 10	(Italy) Aironi
	Report

Parc y Scarlets
Attendance: 6,123
Referee: John Lacey

17 September 2010
20:05

Ulster (Ireland)	29 – 21	(Scotland) Edinburgh
	Report

Ravenhill
Attendance: 7,461
Referee: Alan Falzone

18 September 2010
18:30

(1 BP) Cardiff Blues (Wales)	43 – 21	(Wales) Newport Gwent Dragons
	Report

Cardiff City Stadium
Attendance: 11,194
Referee: Nigel Owens

18 September 2010
19:05

Benetton Treviso (Italy)	29 – 13	(Ireland) Leinster
	Report

Stadio di Monigo
Attendance: 5,000
Referee: Peter Allan

18 September 2010
20:00

Munster (Ireland)	22 – 10	(Wales) Ospreys
	Report

Thomond Park
Attendance: 18,400
Referee: Neil Paterson

=== Round 4 ===
24 September 2010
19:05

Benetton Treviso (Italy)	7 – 19	(Wales) Cardiff Blues
	Report

Stadio di Monigo
Attendance: 5,000
Referee: Andrew McMenemy

24 September 2010
19:05

(1 BP) Edinburgh (Scotland)	32 – 24	(Ireland) Leinster
	Report

Murrayfield
Attendance: 2,923
Referee: Tim Hayes

24 September 2010
19:05

Newport Gwent Dragons (Wales)	14 – 27	(Wales) Scarlets
	Report

Rodney Parade
Attendance: 6,118
Referee: James Jones

24 September 2010
19:30

Glasgow Warriors (Scotland)	29 – 43	(Ireland) Munster (1 BP)
	Report

Firhill Stadium
Attendance: 3,432
Referee: Carlo Damasco

25 September 2010
18:30

(1 BP) Ospreys (Wales)	38 – 6	(Italy) Aironi
	Report

Liberty Stadium
Attendance: 7,289
Referee: Andy Macpherson

25 September 2010
19:30

Connacht (Ireland)	15 – 15	(Ireland) Ulster
	Report

Sportsground
Attendance: 3,761
Referee: Alain Rolland

=== Round 5 ===
30 September 2010
19:05

Cardiff Blues (Wales)	22 – 6	(Ireland) Connacht
	Report

Cardiff City Stadium
Attendance: 11,058
Referee: Andy Macpherson

1 October 2010
19:05

Benetton Treviso (Italy)	20 – 13	(Wales) Newport Gwent Dragons (1 BP)
	Report

Stadio di Monigo
Attendance: 4,800

1 October 2010
19:05

Ulster (Ireland)	19 – 17	(Scotland) Glasgow Warriors (1 BP)
	Report

Ravenhill
Attendance: 7,822

2 October 2010
19:05

(1 BP) Aironi (Italy)	9 – 10	(Scotland) Edinburgh
	Report

Stadio Zaffanella
Attendance: 4,053

2 October 2010
19:30

Leinster (Ireland)	13 – 9	(Ireland) Munster (1 BP)
	Report

Aviva Stadium
Attendance: 50,645
Referee: Jérôme Garces

2 October 2010
20:10

(1 BP) Scarlets (Wales)	18 – 21	(Wales) Ospreys
	Report

Parc y Scarlets
Attendance: 13,707
Referee: Nigel Owens

=== Round 6 ===
22 October 2010
19:05

Edinburgh (Scotland)	21 – 16	(Ireland) Ulster (1 BP)
	Report

Murrayfield
Attendance: 3,195
Referee: James Jones

22 October 2010
19:45

(1 BP) Munster (Ireland)	39 – 13	(Italy) Benetton Treviso
	Report

Thomond Park
Attendance: 17,104
Referee: David Jones

22 October 2010
20:05

(1 BP) Cardiff Blues (Wales)	10 – 16	(Wales) Scarlets
	Report

Cardiff City Stadium
Attendance: 14,026
Referee: Tim Hayes

23 October 2010
18:05

Connacht (Ireland)	6 – 18	(Ireland) Leinster
	Report

Sportsground
Attendance: 4,582
Referee: George Clancy

23 October 2010
18:30

Newport Gwent Dragons (Wales)	36 – 5	(Italy) Aironi
	Report

Rodney Parade
Attendance: 5,033
Referee: Andrew McMenemy

24 October 2010
16:10

Glasgow Warriors (Scotland)	31 – 23	(Wales) Ospreys
	Report

Firhill Stadium
Attendance: 2,554
Referee: David Wilkinson

=== Round 7 ===
29 October 2010
19:05

Aironi (Italy)	3 – 20	(Wales) Cardiff Blues
	Report

Stadio Zaffanella
Attendance: 2,900
Referee: Graham Knox

29 October 2010
19:05

Ulster (Ireland)	6 – 16	(Ireland) Munster
	Report

Ravenhill
Attendance: 10,750
Referee: Alan Lewis

29 October 2010
20:05

Scarlets (Wales)	18 – 14	(Scotland) Glasgow Warriors (1 BP)
	Report

Parc y Scarlets
Attendance: 7,149
Referee: Peter Fitzgibbon

30 October 2010
18:05

Leinster (Ireland)	19 – 18	(Scotland) Edinburgh (1 BP)
	Report

RDS Arena
Attendance: 16,786
Referee: Carlo Damasco

30 October 2010
18:30

(1 BP) Ospreys (Wales)	16 – 21	(Wales) Newport Gwent Dragons
	Report

Liberty Stadium
Attendance: 8,123
Referee: Dave Pearson

30 October 2010
19:05

Benetton Treviso (Italy)	24 – 17	(Ireland) Connacht
	Report

Stadio di Monigo
Attendance: 5,000
Referee: Tim Hayes

=== Round 8 ===
5 November 2010
19:05

Edinburgh (Scotland)	21 – 9	(Italy) Benetton Treviso
	Report

Murrayfield
Attendance: 2,422

5 November 2010
19:30

Glasgow Warriors (Scotland)	33 – 8	(Italy) Aironi
	Report

Firhill Stadium
Attendance: 2,078

19 November 2010
19:00

Connacht (Ireland)	15 – 16	(Wales) Ospreys
	Report

Sportsground
Attendance: 2,035

19 November 2010
19:05

Leinster (Ireland)	27 – 6	(Wales) Newport Gwent Dragons
	Report

RDS Arena
Attendance: 10,390
Referee: Stefano Penne

21 November 2010
15:45

Cardiff Blues (Wales)	15 – 37	(Ireland) Ulster
	Report

Cardiff City Stadium
Attendance: 6,202

21 November 2010
17:35

Munster (Ireland)	27 – 26	(Wales) Scarlets
	Report

Musgrave Park
Attendance: 5,324
Referee: James Jones

=== Round 9 ===
26 November 2010
19:05

Benetton Treviso (Italy)	9 – 19	(Ireland) Ulster
	Report

Stadio di Monigo
Attendance: 3,000

26 November 2010
19:05

Edinburgh (Scotland)	24 – 19	(Ireland) Connacht (1 BP)
	Report

Murrayfield
Attendance: 1,707

26 November 2010
19:05

Newport Gwent Dragons (Wales)	20 – 6	(Ireland) Munster
	Report

Rodney Parade
Attendance: 5,079
Referee: Alan Falzone

27 November 2010
13:30

(1 BP) Cardiff Blues (Wales)	38 – 6	(Scotland) Glasgow Warriors
	Report

Cardiff City Stadium
Attendance: 3,760
Referee: Dudley Phillips

27 November 2010
19:05

Aironi (Italy)	17 – 34	(Wales) Scarlets (1 BP)
	Report

Stadio Zaffanella
Attendance: 2,000
Referee: Andy MacPherson

28 November 2010
17:00

Ospreys (Wales)	19 – 15	(Ireland) Leinster (1 BP)
	Report

Liberty Stadium
Attendance: 4,122
Referee: David Wilkinson

=== Round 10 ===
3 December 2010
19:00

Connacht (Ireland)	P – P	(Italy) Aironi

Sportsground

3 December 2010
19:05

Scarlets (Wales)	17 – 17	(Ireland) Leinster
	Report

Parc y Scarlets
Attendance: 5,142
Referee: Nigel Owens

3 December 2010
19:05

Ulster (Ireland)	P – P	(Wales) Newport Gwent Dragons

Ravenhill

3 December 2010
19:30

Glasgow Warriors (Scotland)	P – P	(Italy) Benetton Treviso

Firhill Stadium

4 December 2010
17:00

Munster (Ireland)	16 – 9	(Wales) Cardiff Blues
	Report

Thomond Park
Attendance: 18,000
Referee: Alain Rolland

4 December 2010
18:30

Ospreys (Wales)	33 – 16	(Scotland) Edinburgh
	Report

Liberty Stadium
Attendance: 5,158
Referee: James Jones

=== Round 11 ===
24 December 2010
14:30

Benetton Treviso (Italy)	15 – 10	(Italy) Aironi
	Report

Stadio di Monigo
Attendance: 3,500
Referee: Carlo Damasco

27 December 2010
15:20

Newport Gwent Dragons (Wales)	P – P	(Wales) Cardiff Blues

Rodney Parade

27 December 2010
16:00

Ulster (Ireland)	13 – 30	(Ireland) Leinster
	Report

Ravenhill
Attendance: 11,426

27 December 2010
16:10

Ospreys (Wales)	60 – 17	(Wales) Scarlets
	Report

Liberty Stadium
Attendance: 18,151

27 December 2010
18:10

Connacht (Ireland)	12 – 16	(Ireland) Munster
	Report

Sportsground
Attendance: 4,795

==== 1872 Cup 1st round ====
27 December 2010
17:35

Glasgow Warriors (Scotland)	30 – 18	(Scotland) Edinburgh
	Report

Firhill Stadium
Attendance: 7,062
Referee: Andy Macpherson (SRU)

=== Round 12 ===
31 December 2010
14:05

Cardiff Blues (Wales)	27 – 25	(Wales) Ospreys
	Report

Cardiff City Stadium
Attendance: 22,160

31 December 2010
14:30

Aironi (Italy)	15 – 16	(Italy) Benetton Treviso
	Report

Stadio Luigi Zaffanella
Attendance: 4,127

1 January 2011
17:30

Leinster (Ireland)	30 – 8	(Ireland) Connacht
	Report

RDS Arena
Attendance: 17,136

1 January 2011
18:30

Scarlets (Wales)	21 – 15	(Wales) Newport Gwent Dragons
	Report

Parc y Scarlets
Attendance: 9,671

1 January 2011
19:30

Munster (Ireland)	35 – 10	(Ireland) Ulster
	Report

Thomond Park
Attendance: 22,000

==== 1872 Cup 2nd round ====
2 January 2011
17:35

Edinburgh (Scotland)	28 – 17	(Scotland) Glasgow Warriors
	Report

Murrayfield
Attendance: 9,292

=== Round 13 ===
6 January 2011
19:35

Newport Gwent Dragons (Wales)	17 – 16	(Ireland) Connacht (1 BP)
	Report

Rodney Parade
Attendance: 5,117
Referee: Alan Lewis

7 January 2011
19:05

(1 BP) Ulster (Ireland)	32 – 13	(Italy) Benetton Treviso
	Report

Ravenhill
Attendance: 6,651
Referee: Leighton Hodges

7 January 2011
19:30

Cardiff Blues (Wales)	24 – 13	(Italy) Aironi
	Report

Cardiff City Stadium
Attendance: 6,523
Referee: Peter Allan

7 January 2011
19:35

Leinster (Ireland)	15 – 10	(Wales) Ospreys (1 BP)
	Report

RDS Arena
Attendance: 14,876
Referee: Nigel Owens

8 January 2011
18:30

(1 BP) Edinburgh (Scotland)	16 – 21	(Wales) Scarlets
	Report

Murrayfield
Attendance: 1,673
Referee: Peter Fitzgibbon

8 January 2011
19:30

Munster (Ireland)	22 – 20	(Scotland) Glasgow Warriors (1 BP)
	Report

Musgrave Park
Attendance: 8,500

=== Round 14 ===
10 February 2011
19:05

Leinster (Ireland)	21 – 16	(Italy) Aironi
	Report

RDS Arena
Attendance: 9,790
Referee: Nigel Owens

11 February 2011
19:35

Glasgow Warriors (Scotland)	15 – 26	(Wales) Cardiff Blues
	Report

Firhill Stadium
Attendance: 1,917
Referee: Dudley Phillips

12 February 2011
14:00

Newport Gwent Dragons (Wales)	30 – 22	(Scotland) Edinburgh
	Report

Rodney Parade
Attendance: 4,277
Referee: Alan Falzone

12 February 2011
19:35

Connacht (Ireland)	17 – 13	(Wales) Scarlets
	Report

Sportsground
Attendance: 1,135
Referee: Andrew McMenemy

13 February 2011
14:00

Benetton Treviso (Italy)	19 – 18	(Ireland) Munster
	Report

Stadio di Monigo
Attendance: 3,500

13 February 2011
17:10

Ospreys (Wales)	23 – 22	(Ireland) Ulster
	Report

Liberty Stadium
Attendance: 5,802
Referee: Neil Patterson

=== Round 15 ===
18 February 2011
19:00

(1 BP) Connacht (Ireland)	37 – 8	(Scotland) Glasgow Warriors
	Report

Sportsground
Attendance: 1,268

18 February 2011
19:05

(1 BP) Scarlets (Wales)	16 – 18	(Ireland) Ulster
	Report

Parc y Scarlets
Attendance: 5,463
Referee: Andy Macpherson

18 February 2011
19:50

Munster (Ireland)	23 – 13	(Scotland) Edinburgh
	Report

Thomond Park Stadium
Attendance: 20,000
Referee: Nigel Owens

19 February 2011
17:30

Benetton Treviso (Italy)	18 – 34	(Wales) Ospreys (1 BP)
	Report

Stadio di Monigo
Attendance: 4,200
Referee: John Lacey

19 February 2011
18:30

Cardiff Blues (Wales)	11 – 3	(Ireland) Leinster
	Report

Cardiff City Stadium
Attendance: 10,741
Referee: Carlo Damasco

20 February 2011
17:30

Aironi (Italy)	3 – 18	(Wales) Newport Gwent Dragons
	Report

Stadio Zaffanella
Attendance: 2,000
Referee: Neil Paterson

=== Round 16 ===
24 February 2011
19:35

Scarlets (Wales)	11 – 3	(Scotland) Edinburgh
	Report

Parc y Scarlets
Attendance: 5,857
Referee: Dudley Phillips

25 February 2011
19:05

Ulster (Ireland)	32 – 13	(Wales) Cardiff Blues
	Report

Ravenhill
Attendance: 8,383
Referee: James Jones

25 February 2011
19:10

Leinster (Ireland)	30 – 5	(Italy) Benetton Treviso
	Report

RDS Arena
Attendance: 10,236
Referee: Neil Hennessy

25 February 2011
19:50

Glasgow Warriors (Scotland)	16 – 16	(Wales) Newport Gwent Dragons
	Report

Firhill Stadium
Attendance: 1,709
Referee: Peter Fitzgibbon

27 February 2011
14:00

Aironi (Italy)	10 – 20	(Ireland) Munster
	Report

Stadio Zaffanella
Attendance: 1,500

27 February 2011
14:30

Ospreys (Wales)	33 – 18	(Ireland) Connacht
	Report

Liberty Stadium
Attendance: 5,851
Referee: Stefano Penne

=== Round 17 ===
4 March 2011
19:00

Connacht (Ireland)	31 – 25	(Italy) Benetton Treviso
	Report

Sportsground
Attendance: 1,563

4 March 2011
19:05

Ulster (Ireland)	23 – 10	(Italy) Aironi
	Report

Ravenhill
Attendance: 7,700

4 March 2011
19:30

Edinburgh (Scotland)	11 – 16	(Wales) Cardiff Blues
	Report

Murrayfield
Attendance: 1,776

4 March 2011
19:35

Leinster (Ireland)	26 – 15	(Wales) Scarlets
	Report

RDS Arena
Attendance: 11,976
Referee: Andy Macpherson

5 March 2011
17:30

Ospreys (Wales)	37 – 6	(Scotland) Glasgow Warriors
	Report

Liberty Stadium
Attendance: 5,642

5 March 2011
19:30

Munster (Ireland)	38 – 17	(Wales) Newport Gwent Dragons
	Report

Musgrave Park
Attendance: 6,213

=== Rearranged fixtures ===
11 March 2011
18:30

Connacht (Ireland)	11 – 6	(Italy) Aironi (1 BP)
	Report

Sportsground
Attendance: 1,015
Referee: James Jones

18 March 2010
19:05

Ulster (Ireland)	25 – 23	(Wales) Newport Gwent Dragons (1 BP)
	Report

Ravenhill
Attendance: 7,661
Referee: James Jones

18 March 2010
19:30

Glasgow Warriors (Scotland)	25 – 17	(Italy) Benetton Treviso
	Report

Attendance: 1,369

=== Round 18 ===
25 March 2011
19:05

(1 BP) Cardiff Blues (Wales)	15 – 16	(Ireland) Munster
	Report

Cardiff City Stadium
Attendance: 11,112
Referee: Alan Lewis

25 March 2011
20:05

(1 BP) Glasgow Warriors (Scotland)	19 – 22	(Ireland) Ulster
	Report

Firhill Stadium
Attendance: 2,715
Referee: David Jones

26 March 2011
17:30

Aironi (Italy)	25 – 13	(Ireland) Connacht
	Report

Stadio Zaffanella
Attendance: 2,700

26 March 2011
18:30

Edinburgh (Scotland)	23 – 16	(Wales) Ospreys (1 BP)
	Report

Murrayfield
Attendance: 1,982
Referee: Dudley Phillips

27 March 2011
14:30

Newport Gwent Dragons (Wales)	16 – 26	(Ireland) Leinster
	Report

Rodney Parade
Attendance: 4,028
Referee: Andy MacPherson

27 March 2011
17:35

Scarlets (Wales)	22 – 16	(Italy) Benetton Treviso (1 BP)
	Report

Parc y Scarlets
Attendance: 5,943
Referee: John Lacey

=== Round 19 ===
1 April 2011
19:05

Ulster (Ireland)	20 – 18	(Wales) Scarlets (1 BP)
	Report

Ravenhill
Attendance: 8,646
Referee: Graham Knox

1 April 2011
19:45

Connacht (Ireland)	27 – 23	(Scotland) Edinburgh (1 BP)
	Report

Sportsground
Attendance: 1,586

2 April 2011
15:30

(1 BP) Aironi (Italy)	16 – 17	(Scotland) Glasgow Warriors
	Report

Stadio Zaffanella
Attendance: 2,700

2 April 2011
18:30

Ospreys (Wales)	21 – 21	(Wales) Cardiff Blues
	Report

Liberty Stadium
Attendance: 11,619
Referee: Christophe Berdos

2 April 2011
19:30

Munster (Ireland)	24 – 23	(Ireland) Leinster (1 BP)
	Report

Thomond Park
Attendance: 25,923
Referee: Andrew Small

3 April 2011
14:45

(1 BP) Newport Gwent Dragons (Wales)	33 – 10	(Italy) Benetton Treviso
	Report

Rodney Parade
Attendance: 4,051
Referee: Peter Fitzgibbon

=== Round 20 ===
15 April 2011
19:05

Newport Gwent Dragons (Wales)	32 – 28	(Wales) Ospreys
	Report

Rodney Parade
Attendance: 5,496

15 April 2011
19:45

Connacht (Ireland)	12 – 26	(Wales) Cardiff Blues
	Report

Sportsground
Attendance: 1,856

15 April 2011
19:50

Edinburgh (Scotland)	32 – 15	(Italy) Aironi
	Report

Murrayfield
Attendance: 1,565

16 April 2011
15:00

Benetton Treviso (Italy)	19 – 16	(Scotland) Glasgow Warriors
	Report

Stadio di Monigo
Attendance: 4,000

16 April 2011
18:15

Scarlets (Wales)	6 – 13	(Ireland) Munster
	Report

Parc y Scarlets
Attendance: 9,108

16 April 2011
20:00

Leinster (Ireland)	34 – 26	(Ireland) Ulster
	Report

RDS Arena
Attendance: 17,670

=== Round 21 ===
21 April 2011
19:05

Cardiff Blues (Wales)	29 – 9	(Italy) Benetton Treviso
	Report

Cardiff City Stadium
Attendance: 9,372

22 April 2011
19:05

Ulster (Ireland)	27 – 16	(Ireland) Connacht
	Report

Ravenhill
Attendance: 9,239

22 April 2011
19:30

Edinburgh (Scotland)	27 – 15	(Wales) Newport Gwent Dragons
	Report

Murrayfield
Attendance: 2,935

22 April 2011
20:05

Glasgow Warriors (Scotland)	29 – 37	(Wales) Scarlets
	Report

Firhill Stadium
Attendance: 3,873

23 April 2011
14:30

Aironi (Italy)	8 – 20	(Ireland) Leinster
	Report

Stadio Zaffanella
Attendance: 4,000

23 April 2011
18:30

Ospreys (Wales)	20 – 22	(Ireland) Munster
	Report

Liberty Stadium
Attendance: 9,481

=== Rearranged fixture ===
29 April 2011
16:05

Newport Gwent Dragons (Wales)	28 – 15	(Wales) Cardiff Blues
	Report

Rodney Parade
Attendance: 5,568

=== Round 22 ===
6 May 2011
19:05

Leinster (Ireland)	38 – 3	(Scotland) Glasgow Warriors
	Report

RDS Arena
Attendance: 12,318
Referee: James Jones

6 May 2011
19:05

Munster (Ireland)	22 – 6	(Ireland) Connacht
	Report

Thomond Park
Attendance: 19,835

6 May 2011
19:05

Newport Gwent Dragons (Wales)	13 – 20	(Ireland) Ulster
	Report

Rodney Parade
Attendance: 5,062

6 May 2011
19:05

Scarlets (Wales)	38 – 23	(Wales) Cardiff Blues
	Report

Parc y Scarlets
Attendance: 11,200

6 May 2011
20:05

Aironi (Italy)	10 – 12	(Wales) Ospreys
	Report

Stadio Zaffanella
Attendance: 3,700

6 May 2011
20:05

Benetton Treviso (Italy)	31 – 6	(Scotland) Edinburgh
	Report

Stadio di Monigo
Attendance: 5,000

== Playoffs ==
=== Semi-finals ===
13 May 2011
19:05

Leinster (Ireland)	18 – 3	(Ireland) Ulster
Try: McFadden 25' m Fitzgerald 72' c Con: McFadden (1/1); Pen: Sexton (2/3) 5', 40'	Report	Pen: Pienaar (1/1) 62'

RDS Arena
Attendance: 14,476
Referee: George Clancy

14 May 2011
18:30

Munster (Ireland)	18 – 11	(Wales) Ospreys
Try: Barnes (2) 32' m, 57' c Con: O'Gara (1/2); Pen: O'Gara (2/4) 14', 49'	Report	Try: Fussell 78' m Pen: Biggar (2/2) 38', 55'

Thomond Park
Attendance: 13,147
Referee: Nigel Owens

=== Grand Final ===
28 May 2011
17:05

Munster (Ireland)	19 – 9	(Ireland) Leinster
Try: Howlett 12' c Earls 66' m Penalty try 79' c Con: O'Gara (2/3)	Report	Pen: Sexton (3/4) 29', 46', 60'

Thomond Park
Attendance: 26,100
Referee: Nigel Owens

== Individual statistics ==
Note: Flags to the left of player names indicate national team as has been defined under IRB eligibility rules, or primary nationality for players who have not yet earned international caps. Players may hold one or more non-IRB nationalities.

=== Top points scorers ===
Rank	Player	Team	Points
1	(Wales) Dan Biggar	(Wales) Ospreys	248
2	(Ireland) Ian Keatley	(Ireland) Connacht	224
3	(Ireland) Ronan O'Gara	(Ireland) Munster	183
4	(Scotland) Dan Parks	(Wales) Cardiff Blues	158
4	(Wales) Rhys Priestland	(Wales) Scarlets	158
6	(Wales) Jason Tovey	(Wales) Newport Gwent Dragons	142
7	(Fiji) Isa Nacewa	(Ireland) Leinster	140
8	(Scotland) Chris Paterson	(Scotland) Edinburgh	133

=== Top try scorers ===
Rank	Player	Team	Tries
1	(Netherlands) Tim Visser (Note: Tim Visser did not qualify for Scotland until June 2012.)	(Scotland) Edinburgh	14
2	(Wales) Aled Brew	(Wales) Newport Gwent Dragons	12
3	(Wales) Jonathan Davies	(Wales) Scarlets	9
3	(Canada) D. T. H. van der Merwe	(Scotland) Glasgow Warriors	9
5	(Scotland) Simon Danielli	(Ireland) Ulster	8
5	(Wales) Richard Fussell	(Wales) Ospreys	8
5	(Ireland) Craig Gilroy	(Ireland) Ulster	8
5	(Ireland) Shane Horgan	(Ireland) Leinster	8
5	(New Zealand) Doug Howlett	(Ireland) Munster	8

== Television coverage ==
Coverage moved back to free to air television. Ulster's matches were televised only in Northern Ireland on BBC Two Northern Ireland apart from their away matches in Aironi, Cardiff Blues, Ospreys and Newport Gwent Dragons. They also televised the Round 10 match between Scarlets vs Leinster as a replacement for the scheduled Ulster vs Newport Gwent Dragons match which was postponed.
