= Marcus Horan =

Irish rugby union player

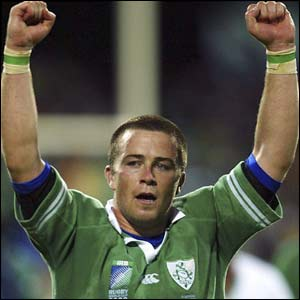
- Horan celebrating after an Irish victory at the 2003 Rugby World Cup.
- Born: 7 September 1977 (age 49) Clonlara, Ireland
- Height: 1.85 m (6 ft 1 in)
- Weight: 106 kg (16.7 st; 234 lb)
- School: St. Munchin's College
- University: Limerick Institute of Technology
- Notable relative: Dave Kilcoyne (cousin)

Rugby union career
- Position: Prop
Senior career
Years	Team	Apps	(Points)
1999–2013	Munster	225	(125)
- Correct as of 20 April 2013
International career
Years	Team	Apps	(Points)
2000–2011	Ireland	67	(30)
2000–2010	Ireland A	15	(5)
- Correct as of 29 September 2011

Marcus Horan (born 7 September 1977) is a retired Irish rugby union player who played prop for Munster and Ireland.

== Early life ==
Horan was educated at Scoil Seanain Naofa (Clonlara National School), St. Munchin's College and Limerick Institute of Technology. The current Munster and Ireland prop Dave Kilcoyne is a cousin of Horan's.

== Munster ==
Horan made his Munster debut in the 1999–00 season, and was part of the winning team that saw Munster crowned Europeans Champions in 2006. He managed to recover from a calf injury that he picked up in training six weeks prior to the final, and played a role in the Heineken Cup final, where Munster defeated Biarritz 23–19.

Horan also played an integral part in Munster's Heineken Cup victory at the Millennium Stadium, Cardiff on 24 May 2008, when Munster were crowned European Champions for the second time, defeating Toulouse 16–13. He lost his place in the Munster team to Wian du Preez but remained an important part of the team, frequently being sprung from the bench and occasionally starting. A broken hand in October 2010 and an irregular heartbeat meant Horan was out for four months. He made his comeback from injury against Edinburgh Rugby on 18 February 2011, and won back the number 1 jersey, starting against Ospreys and Leinster as Munster secured the 2010–11 Magners League.

He became the seventh Munster player to earn 200 caps for the club in a Pro12 game against Ospreys on 3 December 2011. Horan agreed terms for a one-year contract extension with Munster in March 2012. On 11 April 2013, Horan announced his intention to retire from professional rugby at the end of the 2012–13 season. His last game for Munster was the Pro12 fixture against Newport Gwent Dragons on 19 April 2013.

== Ireland ==
Horan made his international debut against the USA during the 1999–00 season, but did not win another cap until the 2002–03 season, which came against Fiji. He lost his place to Reggie Corrigan during the 2003 Rugby World Cup and the 2004 and 2005 Six Nations Championship, but consistently strong performances for Munster saw him regain his place in the team. He held down his place for the 2006, 2007, 2008 and 2009 Six Nations Championship, starting every match of Ireland's victorious Grand Slam campaign. He was also an integral part of Eddie O'Sullivan's 2007 Rugby World Cup squad. He missed the 2009 November Tests after having heart surgery, and lost his place to Cian Healy, who held on to the loosehead-prop position during the 2010 Six Nations Championship. Horan played against the Barbarians F.C. and New Zealand Maori during Ireland's 2010 Summer Tests, but was ruled out of the 2010 November Tests with a broken hand. He missed the 2011 Six Nations Championship, but was selected in Ireland's training squad for the 2011 Rugby World Cup warm-ups in August 2011. He played against Scotland, but missed out on selection in the final squad for the World Cup.

== Statistics ==
=== International analysis by opposition ===
Against	Played	Won	Lost	Drawn	Tries	Points	% Won
Argentina	4	3	1	0	0	0	75
Australia	6	1	5	0	0	0	20
Canada	1	1	0	0	0	0	100
England	6	4	2	0	0	0	66.67
Fiji	1	1	0	0	0	0	100
France	7	2	5	0	0	0	28.57
Georgia	1	1	0	0	0	0	100
Italy	9	9	0	0	0	0	100
Japan	2	2	0	0	0	0	100
Namibia	2	2	0	0	1	5	100
New Zealand	5	0	5	0	1	5	0
Romania	2	2	0	0	0	0	100
Samoa	1	1	0	0	0	0	100
Scotland	8	7	1	0	1	5	69.23
South Africa	4	2	2	0	1	5	50
United States	2	2	0	0	1	5	100
Wales	6	4	2	0	1	5	66.67
Total	67	44	23	0	6	30	65.67

Correct as of 5 July 2017
