= Danny Barnes (rugby union) =

- Born: Daniel Barnes; 7 October 1989 (age 37) Auckland, New Zealand
- Height: 1.84 m (6 ft 1/2 in)
- Weight: 94 kg (14.8 st; 207 lb)
- School: CBS Tralee
- University: University College Cork

Rugby union career
- Position(s): Wing, Centre
Amateur team(s)
| Years | Team | Apps | (Points) |
| 2000–2010 | Tralee RFC | | |
| 2010–2013 | Dolphin | | |
Senior career
| Years | Team | Apps | (Points) |
| 2010–2013 | Munster | 34 | (35) |
| 2013–2015 | Newcastle Falcons | 18 | (0) |
| 2015–2016 | Ealing | 17 | (10) |
| 2016–2017 | Chinnor | 12 | (30) |
- Correct as of 11 February 2017
International career
| Years | Team | Apps | (Points) |
| 2009 | Ireland U20Ireland U18 | 3 | (0) |
- Correct as of 10 February 2015

Danny Barnes (born 7 October 1989) is a New Zealand-born, Irish rugby union player. He can play either centre or wing.

== Early life ==
He moved to Tralee, County Kerry aged ten and played rugby for the local side, Tralee RFC.

== Munster ==
Barnes made his Munster debut against Connacht in April 2010. On 14 May 2011, he scored two tries as Munster defeated the Ospreys 18–11 in the Celtic League semi-final at Thomond Park. He also started against Leinster in the 2011 Celtic League Grand Final.

Barnes scored his third try for Munster in their opening Pro12 match against Newport Gwent Dragons in September 2011. He made his Heineken Cup debut for Munster against Northampton Saints in November 2011. He started for Munster A in their 31-12 2011–12 British and Irish Cup Final victory against Cross Keys on 27 April 2012. It was announced on 14 May 2013 that Barnes would be leaving Munster.

== Newcastle Falcons ==
On 4 June 2013, it was announced that Barnes had joined English Aviva Premiership side Newcastle Falcons on a two-year contract.

== Ealing Traifinders ==
On 12 May 2015, Barnes signed for newly promoted RFU Championship side Ealing Trailfinders for the upcoming 2015–16 season.

== Honours ==
- Celtic League:
  - Winner (1): 2010–11
- British and Irish Cup:
  - Winner (1): 2011–12

RWC U20
