= Peter Borlase =

New Zealand rugby union player and coach

- Born: 22 May 1985 (age 41) Christchurch, New Zealand
- Height: 1.93 m (6 ft 4 in)
- Weight: 118 kg (18.6 st; 260 lb)

Rugby union career
- Position: Prop
Provincial / State sides
Years	Team	Apps	(Points)
2007–2010	Canterbury	33	(5)
2010–2012	Munster	7	(0)
2012	→ Connacht	1	(0)
2012–2013	Hawke's Bay	7	(0)
- Correct as of 4 June 2013
Super Rugby
Years	Team	Apps	(Points)
2009–2010	Crusaders	2	(0)
Coaching career
- Years: Team
- 2019–2020: Colorado Raptors
- Correct as of 18 May 2021

Peter Borlase (born 22 May 1985) is a New Zealand rugby union former player and former head coach of the Colorado Raptors in Major League Rugby (MLR).

== Playing career ==
=== Canterbury and Crusaders ===
Borlase has played 33 times for Canterbury in the ITM Cup. Being behind the Franks brothers, Ben and Owen, in the pecking order for the Crusaders he only made 2 Super Rugby appearances.

=== Pro 12 ===
In June 2010, Borlase joined Munster on a 2-year contract. He was signed as a project player, meaning he would make himself available to play for Ireland once qualified to by 3 years residency. He made his Munster début on 16 November 2010 against a touring Australia side and made 7 appearances in the 2010/11 season.

Borlase joined Irish province Connacht on loan in February 2012, to gain match time following injuries and to provide cover at prop. He made his debut for Connacht against Scarlets on 2 March 2012.

Borlase was recalled from his loan at Connacht and added to Munster's 2011–12 Heineken Cup squad in March 2012. His contract was not extended by Munster and he left once his two-year contract expired.

=== Hawke's Bay ===
After leaving Munster, Borlase returned to New Zealand and joined Hawke's Bay to compete in the ITM Cup.

== Coaching career ==
In September 2013, Borlase signed on to coach Gernika RT, in the Spanish League.

Borlase was the head coach of the Denver Barbarians RFC, and an assistant coach with the Denver Stampede. In June 2019 he became Head Coach of the Glendale Raptors.
