= Paul O'Connell =

Irish rugby union coach & player (born 1979)

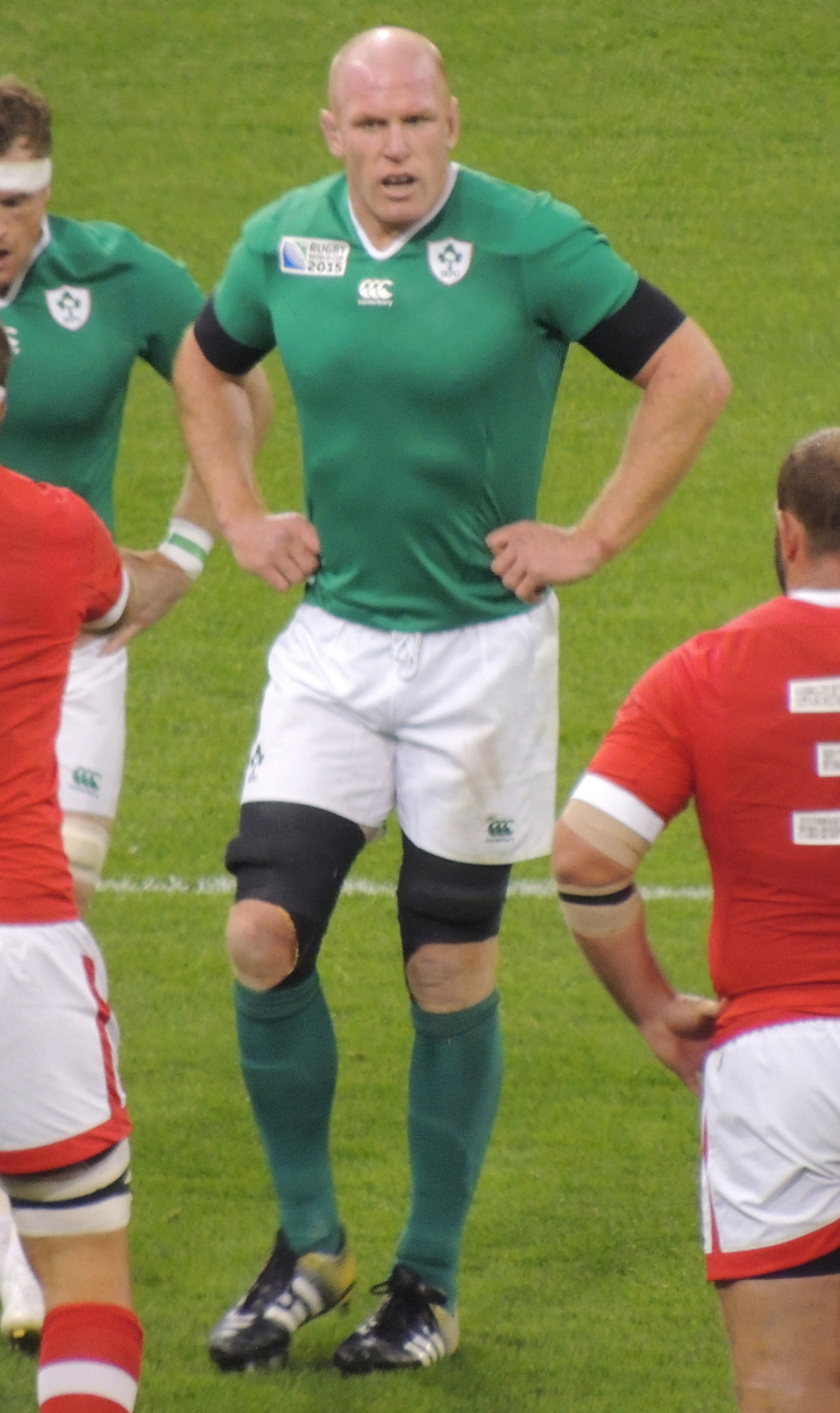
- O'Connell playing for Ireland against Canada during the 2015 Rugby World Cup
- Born: Paul Jeremiah O'Connell; 20 October 1979 (age 47) Limerick, Ireland
- Height: 1.98 m (6 ft 6 in)
- Weight: 112 kg (17.6 st; 247 lb)
- School: Ardscoil Rís, Limerick
- University: University of Limerick

Rugby union career
- Position: Lock
Amateur team(s)
Years	Team	Apps	(Points)
19??–2010	Young Munster		
Senior career
Years	Team	Apps	(Points)
2001–2015	Munster	178	(95)
2015–2016	Toulon	0	(0)
- Correct as of 9 February 2016
International career
Years	Team	Apps	(Points)
	Ireland A	1	(0)
2002–2015	Ireland	108	(40)
2005, 2009, 2013	British & Irish Lions	7	(0)
- Correct as of 11 October 2015
Coaching career
- Years: Team
- 2017–2018: Ireland U20 (assistant)
- 2018–2019: Stade Français (forwards)
- 2021–: Ireland (forwards)

Official website
- poconnell.ie

Paul Jeremiah O'Connell (born 20 October 1979) is an Irish rugby union coach and former player. When he retired, he was Ireland's third most-capped player (108) and the eighteenth most-capped international player in rugby union history. During his career, O'Connell captained Munster, Ireland and the British & Irish Lions. He is now the forwards coach for the Ireland national men's team.

== Early life ==
O'Connell was born in Limerick, Ireland to Mick and Sheila O'Connell. He attended the Model School and Ardscoil Rís, Limerick where he initially excelled at swimming and only started playing rugby at the age of 16, playing for the school in the Munster Schools Senior Cup and representing Irish Schools in 1997–98 along with international teammate Gordon D'Arcy. He also played five consecutive games with the Ireland U21s with Donncha O'Callaghan as his second-row partner. O'Connell completed 3 out of 4 years of a Computer Engineering degree at the University of Limerick, before deferring the remainder of the degree to concentrate on rugby.

== Playing career ==
=== 2001–2003 ===
O'Connell made his debut for Munster on 17 August 2001, in a Celtic League fixture against Edinburgh. His Heineken Cup debut for the club came in a home fixture against Castres Olympique which Munster won 28-23. He started for Munster in their 2002 Heineken Cup Final defeat to Leicester Tigers on 25 May 2002.

O'Connell made his debut for Ireland against Wales in the 2002 Six Nations Championship, starting alongside Mick Galwey and scoring a try. Despite scoring this try, O'Connell has no recollection of the first half, recalling: "I scored a try but I don't remember it. I went to tackle Craig Quinnell and he knocked me clean unconscious with his elbow. I played on for another 25 minutes, scored a try and then, eventually, with seven minutes left in the first half, I came around. I didn't really know what was going on and so I walked off the pitch."

O'Connell was part of the Munster squad that won the 2003 Celtic League, beating Neath 37–17 in the final.

He scored two tries in a 35-12 victory over Wales in a World Cup warm-up game against Wales in August 2003 and was rewarded with a place on the Ireland squad for the 2003 Rugby World Cup. He played against Romania, Namibia, Argentina and Australia in the pool stage, and the 43–21 quarter-final defeat to France.

=== 2004–2006 ===
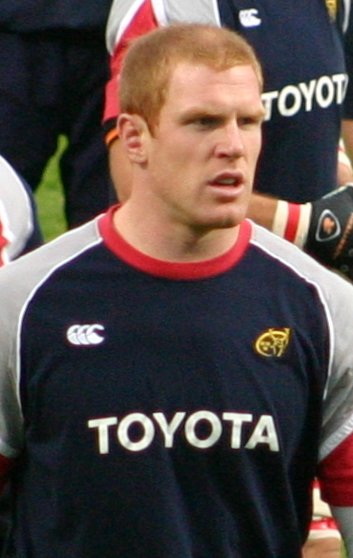
Paul O'Connell warming up for Munster

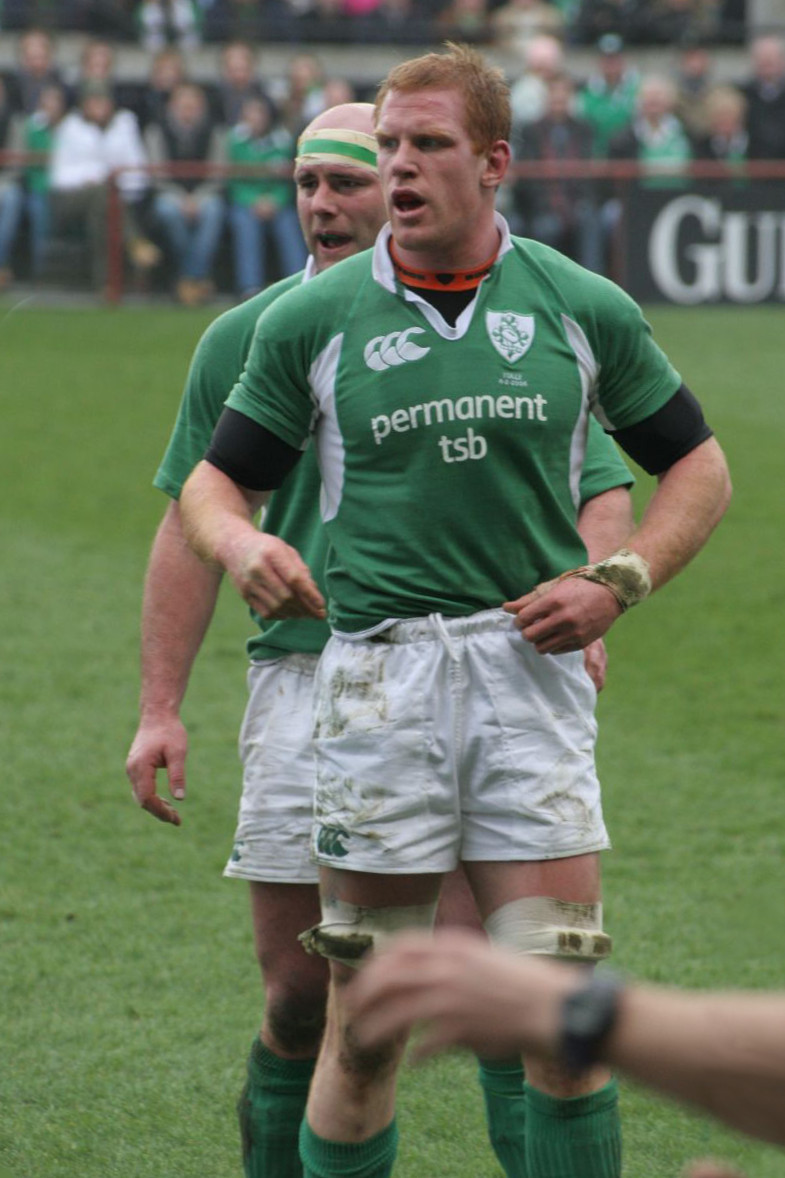
O'Connell in action for Ireland during the 2006 Six Nations Championship

In Ireland's opening game of the 2004 Six Nations Championship, O'Connell captained the side in the absence of Brian O'Driscoll. He also played in the game against Scotland on 27 March 2004, in which Ireland won their first Triple Crown for 19 years. O'Connell also gained silverware on the club front when Munster won the last final of the Celtic Cup, defeating Llanelli Scarlets 27–16 in Lansdowne Road on May 14, 2005. He was also part of the Ireland team that won a Triple Crown in the 2006 Six Nations Championship, playing in a dramatic 24-28 victory over England to clinch the Crown. He scored the last International try at the Old Lansdowne Road before it was demolished and rebuilt as the Aviva Stadium, in a 61-17 victory over the Pacific Islanders.

O'Connell was selected in the squad for the 2005 British & Irish Lions tour to New Zealand. He won his first Test cap for the Lions on 25 June 2005, starting in the first test defeat to New Zealand. O'Connell also started the second and third tests.

O'Connell was shortlisted for the International Rugby Board player of the year in 2006 and was the only Northern Hemisphere nominee. The other four nominees were Dan Carter, Richie McCaw, Chris Latham and Fourie du Preez, with McCaw being named the eventual winner.

O'Connell was an integral member of the Munster team that won the 2005–06 Heineken Cup, scoring a try in the 19-10 quarter-final victory over USA Perpignan and playing a crucial role in defeating Leinster 30-6 in the semi-final and Biarritz Olympique 19–23 in the 2006 Heineken Cup Final.

=== 2007–2009 ===
O'Connell again took over from an injured O'Driscoll as Ireland captain in their historic match against France in the 2007 Six Nations Championship, the first rugby match ever played at Croke Park. O'Connell was awarded the Man of the match accolade following Ireland's historic 43–13 win over England at Croke Park a week later.

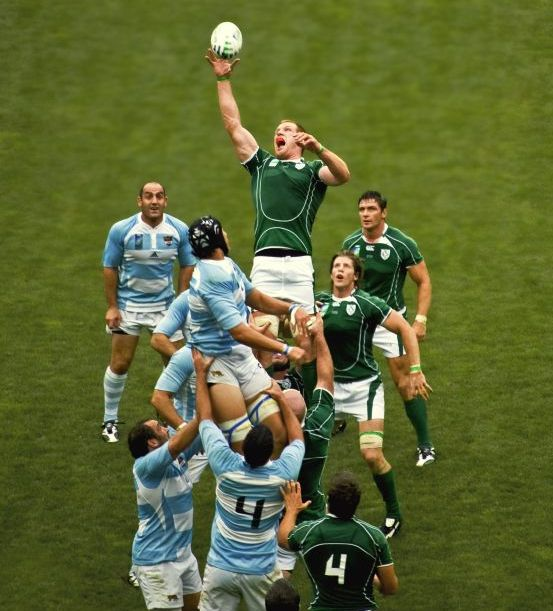
Paul O'Connell winning the line-out against Argentina at the 2007 Rugby World Cup

He was named in Ireland's squad for the 2007 Rugby World Cup on 12 August 2007. His campaign started against Namibia, who, despite being the lowest ranked team in the competition, only lost 32-17 to Ireland. After the game, O'Connell admitted: "A few of the more experienced guys need to start performing better and start leading the team a bit more." O'Connell lined out for another disappointing Irish performance six days later when Georgia came embarrassingly close to beating Ireland, eventually only losing 14-10. O'Connell's world cup ended after Ireland recorded two defeats against France and Argentina, meaning Ireland crashed out in the pool stage of the tournament in one of the lowest points in Irish rugby history.

O'Connell became Munster captain in July 2007, succeeding Anthony Foley. He led Munster to their second Heineken Cup triumph in the 2007–08 season, playing a crucial role in the lead up to Munster's sole try in their 16–13 defeat of Toulouse in the 2008 Heineken Cup Final. He also led the side to victory in the 2008–09 Celtic League.

O'Connell's ability to steal Welsh line-out ball played a key role in Ireland's 17-15 victory over Wales which granted Ireland the 2009 Six Nations Championship and a first Grand Slam in 61 years. He played in all of Ireland's 2009 November Test matches, with Ireland claiming a draw against Australia, and two wins over Fiji and South Africa.

On 21 April 2009, O'Connell was named as the British & Irish Lions captain for the 2009 tour to South Africa. He commented at the time: "I looked at the squad last night and it will be a privilege to lead them. It's a great honour considering the captains that have gone before me, some of them legends of the game." He started the first test defeat alongside Alun Wyn Jones on 20 June 2009. He led the Lions in the second test with a new second-row partner in the form Simon Shaw as the Lions lost the match and with it, the series. O'Connell started in the last test of the series where the Lions managed a consolation victory to avoid the first whitewash by South Africa in 118 years.

=== 2010–2013 ===
O'Connell missed Ireland's first two matches of the 2010 Six Nations Championship due to a hip injury but returned to play England, Wales and Scotland. He missed Ireland's 2010 Summer Tests due to a groin injury that became infected, and also missed the 2010 Autumn Tests.

After being out through injury for nine months, O'Connell made his comeback for Munster against Cardiff Blues in December 2010. He made his Heineken Cup comeback against Ospreys a week later, only to be sent off and banned for four weeks. His return was not enough to stop Munster losing 32-16 to Toulon in a result that meant Munster failed to advance past the pool stages of the competition for the first time in 13 years.

O'Connell was selected in Ireland's 2011 Six Nations Championship squad, playing against Italy, France, Scotland, Wales and England. He was selected in Ireland's 2011 Rugby World Cup training squad for the warm-up tests in August 2011. He played in both tests against France, captained Ireland in their final warm-up Test against England and was selected in Ireland's 30-man squad to go to New Zealand. Ireland won their opening pool game against the USA, with O'Connell being awarded Man of the Match. He started in Ireland's historic 6–15 victory against Australia, their first win against Australia at a World Cup. O'Connell also started against Italy in Ireland's final pool game. His World Cup ended when Ireland were defeated 22–10 against Wales in the quarter-final.

It was announced on 30 December 2011 that O'Connell would captain Ireland in the absence of Brian O'Driscoll during the 2012 Six Nations Championship. The Ireland squad for the 2012 Six Nations was named on 18 January 2012. He was ruled out for the remainder of the 2012 Six Nations after a knee injury sustained in the game against France, which required a recovery period of 3–6 weeks.

O'Connell injured ligaments in his ankle during a Celtic League match against Leinster on 2 April 2011, and was out for four weeks. He made his comeback against Harlequins on 30 April 2011, in the 12–20 Amlin Challenge Cup defeat. He captained Munster to victory over Leinster in the 2011 Magners League Grand Final.

O'Connell signed a new two-year contract on 3 January 2012 that would see him continuing to play his rugby for Munster and Ireland until the end of the 2013–14 season. He made his comeback from the knee injury suffered in the 2012 Six Nations against Ulster in the Heineken Cup quarter-final on 8 April 2012. O'Connell suffered another knee injury in Munster's Pro12 league game against Ulster, which ruled him out for 4–6 weeks and made him a doubt for Ireland's 3-Test series against New Zealand in June 2012. Having missed the series, O'Connell declared himself fit in August 2012. He also stood down as Munster squad captain, making way for teammate Doug Howlett on 24 August 2012, having been captain for just over five years. A back injury prolonged O'Connell's injury-enforced absence at the beginning of the 2012–13 season. He made his comeback on 13 October 2012, in Munster's opening fixture of the 2012–13 Heineken Cup away to Racing Métro 92.

O'Connell suffered a recurrence of his back injury in October 2012 and had to undergo surgery on New Year's Eve, which ruled him out of rugby until early April 2013.

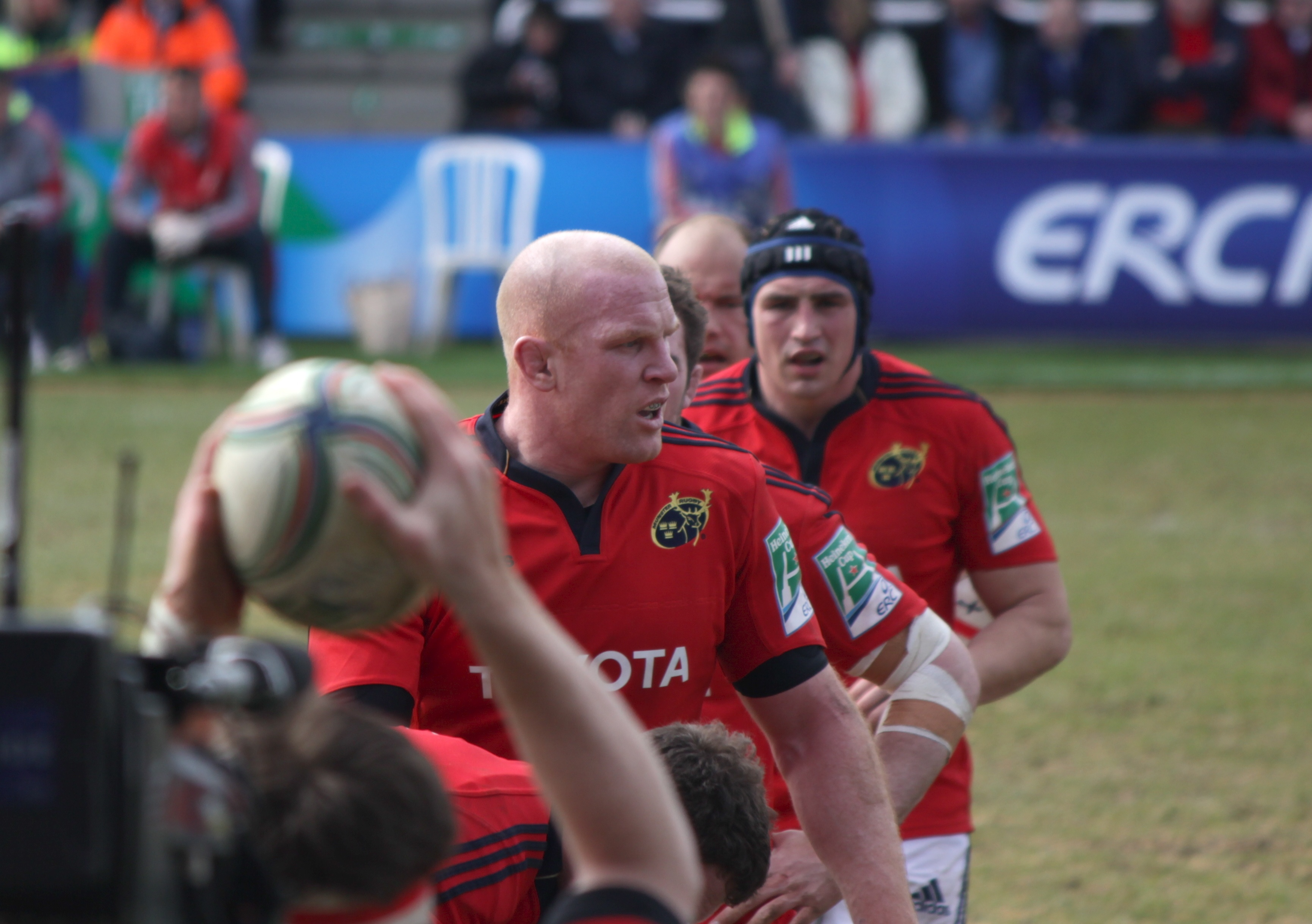
O'Connell playing against Harlequins in April 2013.

However, O'Connell returned early from the injury, having made a quicker-than-expected recovery, and played 40 minutes for Munster A on 12 March 2013. Having come through a full 80 minutes for Young Munster, O'Connell then lined out for the senior Munster side in their league fixture against Connacht on 23 March 2013, again playing the full 80 minutes. He captained Munster in the absence of Doug Howlett in the 12–18 Heineken Cup quarter-final victory over Harlequins on 7 April 2013, a game in which he won the Man-of-the-Match award. He also captained Munster in the 16–10 semi-final defeat to ASM Clermont Auvergne on 27 April 2013.

O'Connell was selected for his third Lions tour on 30 April 2013, named in the squad for the 2013 British & Irish Lions tour to Australia. He captained the side in their opening tour fixture against the Barbarians on 1 June 2013 in the absence of the injured Sam Warburton, scoring a try in the 59–8 win. O'Connell came off the bench in the 12–22 win against the Reds on 8 June 2013. O'Connell started against Waratahs on 15 June 2013. He started in the Lions first Test 21–23 victory against Australia on 22 June 2013. O'Connell was ruled out of the remainder of the 2013 tour after suffering a fractured arm in the first Test against Australia. It was announced on 26 June 2013 that O'Connell would be staying on for the remainder of tour in a coaching role.

=== 2014–2016 ===
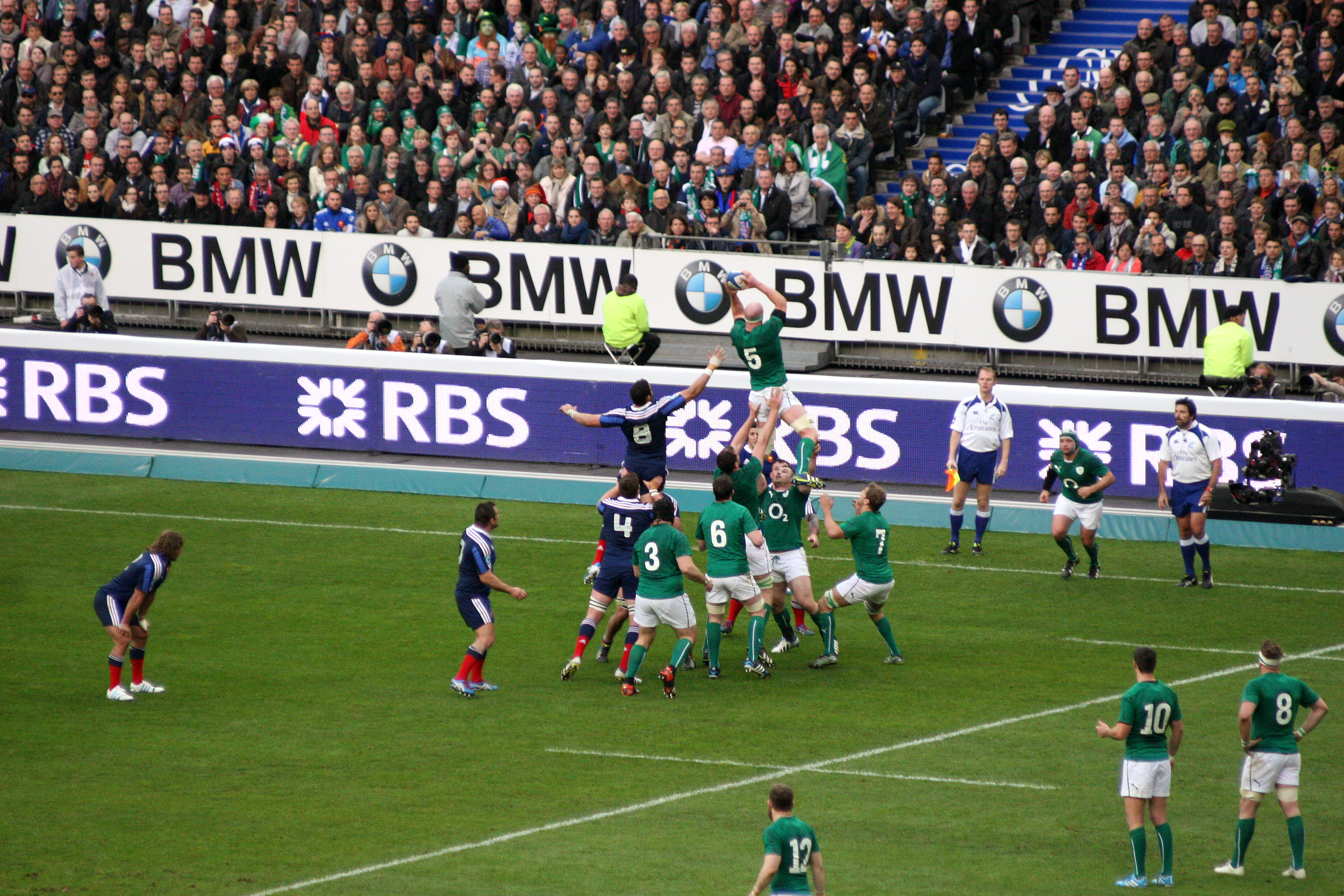
O'Connell contesting a line-out against France during the 2014 Six Nations Championship.

In January 2014, O'Connell signed a new two-year contract to remain at Munster until June 2016. He scored a try in Munster's 47-23 win against Toulouse in the Heineken Cup quarter-final on 5 April 2014.

O'Connell started for Munster in their 26-27 away win against Sale Sharks in the European Rugby Champions Cup on 18 October 2014. He also started in the 14-3 win against Saracens F.C. in Round 2 on 24 October 2014.

On 27 January 2014, O'Connell was named in Ireland's 34-man squad for the opening two fixtures of the 2014 Six Nations Championship. He missed Ireland's opening 28-6 win against Scotland on 2 February 2014 with a chest infection. He returned to captain Ireland against Wales on 8 February 2014. O'Connell started in the 13-10 loss to England on 22 February 2014. He started against Italy on 8 March 2014. O'Connell started the 20-22 win away to France on 15 March 2014, a win that secured the 2014 Championship for Ireland.

O'Connell was named as captain of the Ireland squad for the 2014 Tour to Argentina on 19 May 2014. He started the first test against Argentina on 7 June 2014. O'Connell also started the second test against Argentina on 14 June 2014.

He was named in the Ireland squad for the 2014 Guinness Series on 21 October 2014, continuing as captain. O'Connell started in the 29-15 win against South Africa on 8 November 2014. He also started in the 26-23 win against Australia on 22 November 2014, earning the Man-of-the-Match award.

O'Connell was named as captain in the Ireland squad for the 2015 Six Nations Championship on 1 February 2015. He started in all three of Ireland's opening victories against Italy, France and England O'Connell won his 100th cap for Ireland in a 23–16 defeat to Wales on 14 March 2015, meaning Ireland could not obtain a grand slam. He started in Ireland's final match against Scotland on 21 March 2015, scoring his seventh international try in the 10-40 win and leading Ireland to a second Six Nations Championship, the first time Ireland have won back-to-back championships since 1948-49. O'Connell also won the Player of the Championship award for the 2015 Six Nations. He won the IRUPA Players' Player of the Year 2015 Award in May 2015. O'Connell scored a try in Munster's 50-27 win against Newport Gwent Dragons on 16 May 2015. He started in Munster's 13-31 2015 Pro12 Grand Final defeat against Glasgow Warriors on 30 May 2015.

On 2 June 2015, it was announced that O'Connell had been granted an early release from his contract with Munster and the IRFU. The contract, which had been due to end in June 2016, would instead end upon the conclusion of Ireland's 2015 Rugby World Cup campaign, after which O'Connell would retire from international rugby. On 16 June 2015, it was confirmed that O'Connell had joined French side Toulon on a two-year contract. He was named in the 45-man training squad for the 2015 Rugby World Cup on 24 June 2015. O'Connell won the 2015 Guinness Rugby Writers Player of the Year award in August 2015. He came off the bench for Ireland in their second Rugby World Cup warm-up against Scotland on 15 August 2015. O'Connell started the third warm-up game against Wales on 29 August 2015, his final home game for Ireland. He was named as captain of the final 31-man squad for the World Cup when it was announced on 1 September 2015. O'Connell started in the final warm-up game against England on 5 September 2015. He started the opening pool game against Canada on 19 September 2015. O'Connell came off the bench in the second pool game against Romania on 27 September 2015. He started the third pool game against Italy on 4 October 2015. O'Connell started Ireland's 24-9 win against France on 11 October 2015, but went off with a hamstring injury at the end of the first-half. The injury required surgery, ruling O'Connell out of the remainder of the World Cup and ending his international career. In December 2015, O'Connell joined the Toulon squad.

On 9 February 2016, O'Connell announced that he'd had to retire from all professional rugby based on medical advice, following the injury he suffered during the 2015 Rugby World Cup with Ireland. Due to the injury, O'Connell never played a game for Toulon. In July 2016, it was confirmed that O'Connell had re-joined Munster in an advisory role with the club's academy.

== Coaching career ==
O'Connell left his role as an advisor with the Munster Academy to become an assistant coach with the Ireland Under-20s team in December 2017. He joined French Top 14 club Stade Français, where O'Connell's former Young Munster and Munster teammate Mike Prendergast was also a coach, as their new forwards coach in August 2018, but left after just one season.

O'Connell joined the Ireland national men's team coaching setup as the new forwards' coach in January 2021, replacing his former international teammate Simon Easterby, who changed roles within the setup to become the defence coach.

In March 2025, with head coach Andy Farrell and 2025 Six Nations interim head coach Simon Easterby away coaching for the 2025 British & Irish Lions tour to Australia, O'Connell was named Ireland interim head coach for the summer tour of Georgia and Portugal. In his first game, Ireland defeated Georgia 34–5. In the following game, he led Ireland to the largest victory in their 150-year history with an 106-7 victory over Portugal, surpassing the previous record which had stood since 2000 when Ireland defeated the United States 83–3.

== Media career ==
O'Connell joined BBC Sport as a pundit and commentator ahead of their coverage of the 2017 Six Nations Championship and has worked for BBC Sport since then during their coverage of Wales' and Scotland's Autumn Internationals in November 2017 and throughout the 2018 Six Nations Championship. In 2019 he joined ITV Sport for their coverage of the Rugby World Cup.

During an appearance on A Question of Sport he came up with an instant answer that filled in all 21 missing letters of a 23-letter term consisting of two words; opposing captain Matt Dawson described it as "one of the greatest answers of all time" on a programme which had been on air since 1968.

== Honours and achievements ==
=== International tries ===
Paul O'Connell International Tries
Try	Opponent	City/Country	Venue	Competition	Date
1	Wales	Dublin, Ireland	Lansdowne Road	Six Nations	3 February 2002
2, 3	Wales	Dublin, Ireland	Lansdowne Road	Test Match	16 August 2003
4	Scotland	Edinburgh, Scotland	Murrayfield	Six Nations	12 February 2005
5	New Zealand	Auckland, New Zealand	Eden Park	Test Match	17 June 2006
6	Pacific Islanders	Dublin, Ireland	Lansdowne Road	Test Match	26 November 2006
7	Scotland	Edinburgh, Scotland	Murrayfield	Six Nations	21 March 2015
8	England	London, England	Twickenham	Test Match	5 September 2015

=== International career by opposition ===
Against	Played	Won	Drawn	Lost	Tries	Points	% Won
Argentina	6	5	0	1	0	0	83.33
Australia*	10	4	1	5	0	0	40
Canada	2	2	0	0	0	0	100
England	13	8	0	5	1	5	61.54
Fiji	1	1	0	0	0	0	100
France	16	4	1	11	0	0	25
Georgia	1	1	0	0	0	0	100
Italy	12	12	0	0	0	0	100
Namibia	2	2	0	0	0	0	100
New Zealand*	9	0	0	9	1	5	0
Pacific Islanders	1	1	0	0	1	5	100
Romania	2	2	0	0	0	0	100
Samoa	2	2	0	0	0	0	100
Scotland	12	10	0	2	2	10	83.33
South Africa*	9	5	0	4	0	0	55.56
Tonga	1	1	0	0	0	0	100
United States	2	2	0	0	0	0	100
Wales	14	7	0	7	3	15	50
Total	115	69	2	44	8	40	60

Correct as of 1 May 2021 * indicates inclusion of caps for British & Irish Lions

=== Munster ===
- European Rugby Champions Cup:
  - Winner (2): 2005–06, 2007–08
- United Rugby Championship:
  - Winner (3): 2002–03, 2008–09, 2010–11
- Celtic Cup:
  - Winner (1): 2004–05

=== Ireland ===
- Six Nations Championship:
  - Winner (3): 2009, 2014, 2015
- Grand Slam:
  - Winner (1): 2009
- Triple Crown:
  - Winner (4): 2004, 2006, 2007, 2009

=== British & Irish Lions ===
- British & Irish Lions tours:
  - Tourist (3): 2005, 2009, 2013
  - Series Winner (1): 2013

== Personal life ==
O'Connell announced on The Late Late Show on 29 January 2010 that his girlfriend Emily O'Leary was six months pregnant with their first child. The baby was born on 15 April 2010 at the Mid-Western Regional Maternity Hospital in Limerick. He has been named Paddy O'Connell. O'Connell and O'Leary became engaged in June 2012 and married on 27 July 2013 in Auch Cathedral, France. Their second child, daughter Lola, was born in November 2014. Their third child, a son named Felix, was born in November 2017.

O'Connell was awarded the Freedom of Limerick City in a ceremony in April 2012. In November 2015, O'Connell was conferred with an honorary doctorate from the University of Limerick.

He supports English Premier League football team Everton F.C. O'Connell is also a single figure handicap golfer and is a member of Limerick Golf Club. In September 2016, O'Connell gave a speech to the European players preparing to compete against America in the 2016 Ryder Cup, having been invited to do so by Darren Clarke, Europe's captain.

O'Connell released his autobiography in October 2016 called The Battle. It was named as the Irish Sports Book of the Year for 2016 at the Irish Book Awards.
