= Wian du Preez =

South African rugby union player

- Full name: Wian Hunter du Preez
- Born: 30 October 1982 (age 44) Bloemfontein, South Africa
- Height: 1.85 m (6 ft 1 in)
- Weight: 113 kg (17 st 11 lb; 249 lb)
- School: Grey College, Bloemfontein
- University: University of the Free State

Rugby union career
- Position: Loosehead Prop
- Current team: Lyon
Youth career
- 2002: Free State Cheetahs
Senior career
| Years | Team | Apps | (Points) |
| 2003–2010 | Free State Cheetahs | 74 | (30) |
| 2005 | Sharks | 1 | (0) |
| 2006–2010 | Cheetahs | 59 | (0) |
| 2009–2010 | Munster (loan) | 6 | (0) |
| 2010–2013 | Munster | 81 | (5) |
| 2013 | Free State Cheetahs | 5 | (0) |
| 2014–16 | Lyon | 49 | (15) |
- Correct as of 5 June 2015
International career
| Years | Team | Apps | (Points) |
| 2009 | Emerging Springboks | 1 | (0) |
| 2009 | South Africa | 1 | (0) |
- Correct as of 23 July 2013

Wian du Preez (born 30 October 1982) is a South African rugby union player, currently playing in France for Lyon. He plays as a prop, primarily at loosehead.

Du Preez, a native of Free State, played for the Cheetahs from 2007 until 2010. After completing a loan-spell at Munster, he returned to the Cheetahs to play out the 2010 Super 14.

== Club career ==
Du Preez first played for Munster in late 2009, after he was signed on a three-month loan as injury cover for Marcus Horan. He impressed during his short time there and, in May 2010, it was announced that Du Preez was returning to Munster after signing a two-year permanent contract. He has since become an integral member of the Munster team.

He scored his first try for Munster in their Heineken Cup Round 5 clash with Castres Olympique on 14 January 2012.

Du Preez signed a contract extension with Munster in February 2012.

It was announced on 14 May 2013 that du Preez would be leaving Munster to return to South Africa.

On 13 October 2013, Preez moved to France to sign for Lyon ahead of the 2014–15 Top 14 season.

Du Preez won multiple Currie Cups (2005–07) with the Free State Cheetahs and the Pro 12 with Munster in 2011.

== International career ==
Du Preez was called into the South Africa squad for their Test against Italy in November 2009, due to his proximity to the fixture. He was said to be disillusioned by the lack of opportunities to play for the Springboks and with CJ van der Linde returning from Leinster to claim a place in the Springbok squad, Du Preez decided to put his international career on hold until after the next Rugby World Cup.
