= 2013–14 Munster Rugby season =

- Ground(s): Thomond Park; Musgrave Park (Capacity: 26,500; 8,500)
- Coach: Rob Penney
- Captain: Peter O'Mahony
- League: Pro12
- 2013–14: 3rd (Semi-finals)
1st kit	2nd kit

The 2013–14 Munster Rugby season was Munster's thirteenth season competing in the Pro12 alongside which they also competed in the Heineken Cup for the nineteenth time. It was Rob Penney's second and final season as head coach.

== Coaching & management staff 2013–14 ==
The Munster Coaching and Management staff for the 2013–14 season.

Position	Name	Nationality
Head coach	Rob Penney	New Zealand
Team manager	Niall O'Donovan	Ireland
Forwards Coach	Anthony Foley	Ireland
Backs Coach	Simon Mannix	New Zealand
Skills Coach	Ian Costello	Ireland
Head of Fitness	Adam Trypas	Australia
Strength & conditioning coach	Aidan O'Connell	Ireland
Conditioning Assistant	Will Douglas	Wales
Strength & Rehab Coach	Aled Walters	Wales
Head of physiotherapy	Anthony Coole	South Africa
Physiotherapist	Colm Fuller	Ireland
Rehab physiotherapist	Colm Oakley	Ireland
Performance analyst	George Murray	Ireland
Asst. Performance Analyst	Elliot Corcoran	Ireland
Kit Manager	Jack Kiely	Ireland
Operations manager	Bryan Murphy	Ireland

== Senior playing squad 2013–14 ==
The Munster Senior Squad for the 2013–2014 season. Note: Flags indicate national union under World Rugby eligibility rules. Players may hold more than one non-World Rugby nationality.

Player	Position	Union
Duncan Casey	Hooker	Ireland
Niall Scannell	Hooker	Ireland
**Mike Sherry**	Hooker	Ireland
**Damien Varley**	Hooker	Ireland
**Stephen Archer**	Prop	Ireland
**BJ Botha**	Prop	South Africa
Alan Cotter	Prop	Ireland
James Cronin	Prop	Ireland
**Dave Kilcoyne**	Prop	Ireland
John Ryan	Prop	Ireland
Dave Foley	Lock	Ireland
Billy Holland	Lock	Ireland
Ian Nagle	Lock	Ireland
**Donncha O'Callaghan**	Lock	Ireland
**Paul O'Connell**	Lock	Ireland
**Donnacha Ryan**	Lock	Ireland
Sean Dougall	Flanker	Ireland
Dave O'Callaghan	Flanker	Ireland
**Tommy O'Donnell**	Flanker	Ireland
Barry O'Mahony	Flanker	Ireland
**Peter O'Mahony**	Flanker	Ireland
**Niall Ronan**	Flanker	Ireland
CJ Stander	Flanker	South Africa
Paddy Butler	Number 8	Ireland
James Coughlan	Number 8	Ireland

Player	Position	Union
Gerry Hurley	Scrum-half	Ireland
**Conor Murray**	Scrum-half	Ireland
Cathal Sheridan	Scrum-half	Ireland
Duncan Williams	Scrum-half	Ireland
JJ Hanrahan	Fly-half	Ireland
**Ian Keatley**	Fly-half	Ireland
Cian Bohane	Centre	Ireland
Ivan Dineen	Centre	Ireland
**James Downey**	Centre	Ireland
**Keith Earls**	Centre	Ireland
**Casey Laulala**	Centre	New Zealand
Andrew Conway	Wing	Ireland
Johne Murphy	Wing	Ireland
Luke O'Dea	Wing	Ireland
Ronan O'Mahony	Wing	Ireland
Gerhard van den Heever	Wing	South Africa
**Simon Zebo**	Wing	Ireland
**Denis Hurley**	Fullback	Ireland
**Felix Jones**	Fullback	Ireland

Internationally capped players in bold. Players qualified to play for Ireland on residency or dual nationality. *

=== Senior players in (season 2013/14) ===
- Niall Scannell promoted from Academy
- Duncan Casey promoted from Academy
- James Cronin promoted from Academy
- Gerry Hurley
- Cian Bohane promoted from Academy
- Andrew Conway from Leinster
- Ronan O'Mahony promoted from Academy
- Gerhard van den Heever from Western Province/Stormers

=== Senior players out (season 2013/14) ===
- Seán Henry to Connacht
- Marcus Horan Retiring
- Wian du Preez to Free State Cheetahs
- Christy Condon released
- Peter Stringer to Bath
- Scott Deasy released
- Ronan O'Gara Retiring
- Danny Barnes to Newcastle Falcons
- Doug Howlett Retiring due to injury
- Seán Scanlon to Rotherham

== 2013–14 Pro12 ==
Munster reached the semi-finals of the Pro 12 and faced the Glasgow Warriors at Scotstoun Stadium on 16 May. Glasgow won the match 16–15 to reach the final against Leinster who defeated Ulster 13-9 the day after.

7 September 2013
19:15

(1 BP) Munster (Ireland)	34–23	(Scotland) Edinburgh
Try: Hurley 13' m Coughlan 15' c Cronin 32' c Dineen 53' m Hanrahan 68' c Con: Keatley (2/4); Hanrahan (1/1); Pen: Keatley (1/2) 22'	Report	Try: De Luca 50' c Jones 70' c Con: Francis (1/1); Leonard (1/1); Pen: Francis (2/4) 11', 26'; Leonard (1/1) 62'

Musgrave Park
Attendance: 6,810
Referee: Marius Mitrea (FIR)

13 September 2013
19:30

Zebre (Italy)	21–43	(Ireland) Munster (1 BP)
Try: Orquera 22' m Manici 39' c Con: Orquera (1/2); Pen: Orquera (3/3) 19', 36', 64'	Report	Try: Butler 46' c Stander (2) 58' c, 66' c Keatley 75' c Con: Hanrahan (3/3); Keatley (1/1); Pen: Hanrahan (5/5) 5', 15', 32', 45', 51'

Stadio XXV Aprile
Attendance: 2,550
Referee: Andrew McMenemy (SRU)

20 September 2013
20:30

Benetton Treviso (Italy)	29–19	(Ireland) Munster
Try: Nitoglia (2) 49' c, 61' c Con: Berquist (2/2); Pen: Berquist (5/5) 13', 17', 37', 59', 65'	Report	Try: Earls 7' m penalty try 28' c Archer 46' c Con: Keatley (2/3)

Stadio Comunale di Monigo
Attendance: 4,528
Referee: Leighton Hodges (WRU)

28 September 2013
18:45

Munster (Ireland)	23–9	(Wales) Newport Gwent Dragons
Try: Cronin 35' c O'Mahony 51' c Con: Hanrahan (2/2); Pen: Hanrahan (3/4) 7', 19', 62'	Report	Pen: Burton (3/3) 10', 20', 46'

Musgrave Park
Attendance: 6,248
Referee: Neil Paterson (SRU)

5 October 2013
18:45

Munster (Ireland)	19–15	(Ireland) Leinster (1 BP)
Try: Earls 33' c Con: Keatley (1/1); Pen: Keatley (4/6) 30', 43', 57', 63'	Report	Pen: Madigan (4/5) 3', 24', 53', 55'; McFadden (1/1) 40'

Thomond Park
Attendance: 20,646
Referee: Romain Poite (FFR)

25 October 2013
19:35

(1 BP) Glasgow Warriors (Scotland)	6–13	(Ireland) Munster
Pen: Weir (2/3) 3', 25'	Report	Try: Hanrahan 44' c Con: Hanrahan (1/1); Pen: Hanrahan (2/2) 21', 47'

Scotstoun Stadium
Attendance: 5,726
Referee: Ian Davies (WRU)

2 November 2013
19:15

Munster (Ireland)	12–6	(Wales) Ospreys (1 BP)
Pen: Keatley (3/5) 5', 22', 56'; Hanrahan (1/1) 68'	Report	Pen: Morgan (2/3) 26', 80'

Thomond Park
Attendance: 14,216
Referee: Giuseppe Vivarini (FIR)

23 November 2013
18:30

Cardiff Blues (Wales)	10–31	(Ireland) Munster (1 BP)
Try: Dacey 49' c Con: Humberstone (1/1); Pen: Humberstone (1/2) 13'	Report	Try: Jones 17' c Varley 27' c Cronin 31' c Conway 43' c Con: Hanrahan (4/4); Pen: Hanrahan (1/1) 38'

Cardiff Arms Park
Attendance: 6,122
Referee: David Wilkinson (IRFU)

29 November 2013
19:15

(1 BP) Newport Gwent Dragons (Wales)	14–18	(Ireland) Munster
Try: Pewtner 43' m Pen: Tovey (2/4) 11', 40'; Drop: Tovey (1/1) 70'	Report	Pen: Keatley (6/7) 25', 52', 61', 67', 73', 76'

Rodney Parade
Attendance: 7,118
Referee: Marius Mitrea (FIR)

21 December 2013
19:15

Munster (Ireland)	16–10	(Wales) Scarlets (1 BP)
Try: R. O'Mahony 80' c Con: Hanrahan (1/1); Pen: Hanrahan (3/5) 23', 47', 57'	Report	Try: Barclay 42' c Con: A. Thomas (1/1); Pen: A. Thomas (1/2) 14'

Musgrave Park
Attendance: 7,867
Referee: Nigel Owens (WRU)

27 December 2013
19:15

Munster (Ireland)	22–16	(Ireland) Connacht (1 BP)
Try: Hanrahan 20' c Con: Hanrahan (1/1); Pen: Hanrahan (5/5) 9', 29', 44', 50', 76'	Report	Try: Heffernan 80' c Con: Parks (1/1); Pen: Parks (3/3) 13', 16', 61'

Thomond Park
Attendance: 18,870
Referee: Dudley Phillips (IRFU)

3 January 2014
19:05

Ulster (Ireland)	29–19	(Ireland) Munster
Try: Payne 6' c Cave 37' c Con: Pienaar (2/2); Pen: Pienaar (5/6) 4', 18', 62', 71', 80'	Report	Try: Dineen 40' m Kilcoyne 48' c Coughlan 66' c Con: Keatley (2/3)

Ravenhill Stadium
Attendance: 13,945
Referee: Alain Rolland (IRFU)

8 February 2014
19:15

(1 BP) Munster (Ireland)	54–13	(Wales) Cardiff Blues
Try: Kilcoyne 10' c penalty try 60' c Zebo 64' c van den Heever 66' c Conway 78' c Stander 80' c Con: Hanrahan (6/6); Pen: Hanrahan (4/4) 4', 22', 27', 40'	Report	Try: O. Williams 13' c Con: G. Davies (1/1); Pen: G. Davies (2/2) 8', 31'

Thomond Park
Attendance: 13,821
Referee: Giuseppe Vivarini (FIR)

15 February 2014
18:45

(1 BP) Munster (Ireland)	36–8	(Italy) Zebre
Try: Zebo (2) 26' c, 34' m Slattery (2) 62' c, 79' c O'Donnell 70' c Con: Hanrahan (1/2); Keatley (3/3); Pen: Hanrahan (1/1) 15'	Report	Try: D'Apice 12' m Pen: Palazzani (1/1) 44'

Musgrave Park
Attendance: 7,330
Referee: Dudley Phillips (IRFU)

23 February 2014
16:00

Ospreys (Wales)	11–25	(Ireland) Munster
Try: Beck 39' m Pen: Davies (2/4) 18', 68'	Report	Try: Dougall 6' c Zebo 46' m Downey 71' c Con: Keatley (1/2); Hanrahan (1/1); Pen: Keatley (2/2) 16', 26'

Liberty Stadium
Attendance: 5,766
Referee: David Wilkinson (IRFU)

1 March 2014
18:30

Scarlets (Wales)	18–13	(Ireland) Munster (1 BP)
Try: G. Davies 27' m Barclay 51' c Con: A. Thomas (1/1); Pen: Barkley (1/1) 13'; A. Thomas (1/1) 50'	Report	Try: van den Heever 36' c Con: Keatley (1/1); Pen: Keatley (2/3) 15', 40'

Parc y Scarlets
Attendance: 6,487
Referee: Dudley Phillips (IRFU)

22 March 2014
19:15

Munster (Ireland)	14–3	(Italy) Benetton Treviso
Try: Earls 37' c Downey 55' c Con: Hanrahan (2/2)	Report	Pen: Berquist (1/3) 3'

Thomond Park
Attendance: 13,946
Referee: Leighton Hodges (WRU)

29 March 2014
19:00

Leinster (Ireland)	22–18	(Ireland) Munster (1 BP)
Try: O'Driscoll 57' c Con: Madigan (1/1); Pen: Madigan (5/6) 25', 38', 46', 51', 79'	Report	Pen: Keatley (6/6) 4', 9', 22', 30', 64', 77'

Aviva Stadium
Attendance: 51,700
Referee: Alain Rolland (IRFU)

12 April 2014
18:30

Munster (Ireland)	5–22	(Scotland) Glasgow Warriors
Try: Stander 18' m	Report	Try: Gray 4' c Maitland 25' m Strauss 36' c Con: Weir (2/3); Pen: Weir (1/1) 9'

Thomond Park
Attendance: 13,946
Referee: Nigel Owens (WRU)

19 April 2014
18:15

Connacht (Ireland)	23–32	(Ireland) Munster (1 BP)
Try: Healy 20' m McKeon 53' m Poolman 78' c Con: Parks (1/1); Pen: Nikora (2/2) 15', 63'	Report	Try: Conway 17' c van den Heever 34' c D. Hurley 38' c Butler 72' m Con: Keatley (3/4); Pen: Keatley (2/2) 26', 30'

Galway Sportsgrounds
Attendance: 6,227
Referee: Marius Mitrea (FIR)

3 May 2014
17:00

Edinburgh (Scotland)	12–55	(Ireland) Munster (1 BP)
Try: Bezuidenhout 9' m Nel 22' c Con: Laidlaw (1/2)	Report	Try: Conway 16' c D. Hurley 40' c Varley 49' c penalty try (2) 55' c, 73' c Williams 66' c O'Donnell 80' c Con: Hanrahan (5/5); Murray (2/2); Pen: Hanrahan (2/2) 15', 27'

Meggetland
Attendance: 3,782
Referee: Marius Mitrea (FIR)

10 May 2014
18:30

(1 BP) Munster (Ireland)	17–19	(Ireland) Ulster
Try: Williams 14' c Dougall 49' c Con: Keatley (2/2); Pen: Keatley (1/1) 11'	Report	Try: Heaney 17' c Con: McKinney (1/1); Pen: McKinney (4/4) 36', 47', 53', 65'

Thomond Park
Attendance: 16,436
Referee: Nigel Owens (WRU)

16 May 2014 (Semi-Final)
19:35

Glasgow Warriors (Scotland)	16–15	(Ireland) Munster
Try: Reid 46' c Con: Russell (1/1); Pen: Russell (3/4) 17', 36', 39'	Report	Try: Varley 9' c Dougall 51' m Con: Keatley (1/2); Pen: Keatley (1/1) 66'

Scotstoun Stadium
Attendance: 10,000
Referee: Marius Mitrea (FIR)

== 2013–14 Heineken Cup ==
On 19 January, Munster secured a home quarter-final in the knock-out stages of the 2013–14 Heineken Cup after a 38–6 win against Edinburgh at Thomond Park. They faced Toulouse in the quarter-finals on 5 April. Munster scored six tries to beat Toulouse 43-23 and reach the semi-finals. A Keith Earls's try put Munster into a 10-point lead before two Luke McAlister penalties made it 13–9 at half time. Tries from Dave Kilcoyne and CJ Stander looked to have sealed the victory before Toulouse relied with a try from Hosea Gear. Further tries from Casey Laulala, Simon Zebo and Paul O'Connell made it a comfortable win in the end for Munster. CJ Stander, who replaced the injured Peter O'Mahony in the first half was named Man of the Match.

On 27 April in the semi-final against Toulon at the Stade Vélodrome, Munster lost 24–16. Munster came from 18–9 down at half-time to score the game's only try through Simon Zebo who went over in the corner. Jonny Wilkinson scored 21 points for Toulon.

Team	P	W	D	L	PF	PA	Diff	TF	TA	TB	LB	Pts
(Ireland) Munster (4)	6	5	0	1	161	77	+84	19	6	2	1	23
(England) Gloucester (7C)	6	3	0	3	113	114	−1	13	10	1	1	14
(Scotland) Edinburgh	6	3	0	3	104	141	−37	10	17	0	0	12
(France) Perpignan	6	1	0	5	112	158	−46	10	19	1	2	7
Source : www.ercrugby.com Points breakdown: *4 points for a win *2 points for a draw *1 bonus point for a loss by seven points or less *1 bonus point for scoring four or more tries in a match

12 October 2013
13:35

Edinburgh (Scotland)	29–23	(Ireland) Munster (1 BP)
Try: Scott 5' c T. Visser 68' c Con: Laidlaw (2/2); Pen: Laidlaw (5/6) 11', 21', 28', 33', 75'	Report	Try: Laulala 19' c Sherry 25' c Con: Keatley (2/2); Pen: Keatley (3/3) 15', 52', 64'

Murrayfield
Attendance: 7,024
Referee: JP Doyle (RFU)

19 October 2013
18:00

Munster (Ireland)	26–10	(England) Gloucester
Try: Varley 33' c Murphy 66' c Con: Keatley (2/2); Pen: Keatley (4/5) 3', 9', 12', 65'	Report	Try: Sharples 15' c Con: Bentley (1/1); Pen: Bentley (1/2) 38'

Thomond Park
Attendance: 23,510
Referee: Jérôme Garcès (FFR)

8 December 2013
12:45

(1 BP) Munster (Ireland)	36–8	(France) Perpignan
Try: Dougall 2' c Kilcoyne 25' m Earls 34' c penalty try 65' c Coughlan 77' c Con: Keatley (2/3); Hanrahan (2/2); Pen: Keatley (1/1) 10'	Report	Try: Michel 80' m Pen: Hook (1/2) 44'

Thomond Park
Attendance: 23,615
Referee: Greg Garner (RFU)

14 December 2013
16:40

(1 BP) Perpignan (France)	17–18	(Ireland) Munster
Try: Benvenuti 77' m Pen: Allan (4/7) 6', 18', 24', 63'	Report	Try: penalty try 48' c Hanrahan 80' m Con: Keatley (1/2); Pen: Keatley (2/4) 15', 67'

Stade Aimé Giral
Attendance: 11,824
Referee: JP Doyle (RFU)

11 January 2014
18:00

Gloucester (England)	7–20	(Ireland) Munster
Try: Sharples 39' c Con: F. Burns (1/1)	Report	Try: Earls 32' c P. O'Mahony 60' c Con: Keatley (2/2); Pen: Keatley (2/3) 21', 69'

Kingsholm
Attendance: 16,121
Referee: Leighton Hodges (WRU)

19 January 2014
12:45

(1 BP) Munster (Ireland)	38–6	(Scotland) Edinburgh
Try: Coughlan 7' m Murphy 21' c Murray 43' c P. O'Mahony 56' c Zebo 65' m Jones 75' c Con: Keatley (4/6)	Report	Pen: Laidlaw (2/3) 6', 27'

Thomond Park
Attendance: 25,600
Referee: Wayne Barnes (RFU)

=== Quarter-final ===
5 April 2014
13:30

Munster (Ireland)	47–23	(France) Toulouse
Try: Earls 4' c Kilcoyne 41' c Stander 45' c Laulala 63' m Zebo 73' m O'Connell 79' c Con: Keatley (4/6); Pen: Keatley (3/4) 15', 22', 61'	Report	Try: Gear 53' c Tekori 71' c Con: Beauxis (2/2); Pen: McAlister (3/3) 7', 29', 33'

Thomond Park
Attendance: 26,200
Referee: Nigel Owens (WRU)

=== Semi-final ===
27 April 2014
16:30

Toulon (France)	24–16	(Ireland) Munster
Pen: Wilkinson (7/8) 5', 18', 26', 35', 39', 64', 79'; Drop: Wilkinson (1/2) 30'	Report	Try: Zebo 52' c Con: Keatley (1/1); Pen: Keatley (3/4) 7', 29', 33'

Stade Vélodrome
Attendance: 37,043
Referee: Wayne Barnes (RFU)

== Related ==
2013–14 Connacht Rugby season
