= 2011–12 Munster Rugby season =

- Ground(s): Thomond Park (Capacity: 26,500); Musgrave Park (Capacity: 8,500)
- CEO: Garrett Fitzgerald
- Coach: Tony McGahan
- Captain: Paul O'Connell
- League: Pro12
- 2011–12: 3rd, semi-finals

The 2011–12 Munster Rugby season was Munster's eleventh season competing in the Pro12, alongside which they also competed in the Heineken Cup. It was Tony McGahan's fourth and final season as Director of Rugby.

== Summary ==
Munster were drawn in Pool 1 of the 2011–12 Heineken Cup alongside Scarlets, Northampton Saints and Castres. Munster defeated Northampton 23–21 in their opening pool fixture on 12 November 2011, thanks to an 84th minute drop-goal from Ronan O'Gara. One week later, away from home against Castres, a last-gasp drop-goal from O'Gara again handed victory to Munster, this time 27–24. In the December double-header against Scarlets, Munster emerged victorious from both fixtures, firstly defeating the Welsh side 17–14 in the away leg, before winning 19–13 at home. In Round 5, Munster beat Castres 26–10 at Thomond Park to become the first side to qualify for the quarter-finals. A 51–36 win away from home against Northampton in the sixth and final round, including a hat-trick from Simon Zebo, secured a home quarter-final for Munster. However, in the quarter-final, Munster were beaten 22–16 at home by provincial rivals Ulster, ending their Heineken Cup campaign for the 2011–12 season.

In the 2011–12 Pro12, Munster finished third with 67 points, in a season that included 14 wins, 1 draw and 7 defeats after 22 regular matches. In the play-offs, Munster lost 45–10 away to eventual champions Ospreys, in a match that was Tony McGahan's final as Munster head coach. New Zealander Rob Penney was subsequently confirmed as Munster's new head coach.

== 2011–12 Playing Squad ==
Note: Flags indicate national union under World Rugby eligibility rules. Players may hold more than one non-World Rugby nationality.

Player	Position	Union
Jerry Flannery	Hooker	Ireland
Seán Henry	Hooker	Ireland
Mike Sherry	Hooker	Ireland
Damien Varley	Hooker	Ireland
Stephen Archer	Prop	Ireland
Peter Borlase	Prop	New Zealand
BJ Botha	Prop	South Africa
John Hayes	Prop	Ireland
Marcus Horan	Prop	Ireland
Wian du Preez	Prop	South Africa
John Ryan	Prop	Ireland
Dave Foley	Lock	Ireland
Ian Nagle	Lock	Ireland
Donncha O'Callaghan	Lock	Ireland
Paul O'Connell (c)	Lock	Ireland
Mick O'Driscoll	Lock	Ireland
Donnacha Ryan	Lock	Ireland
Billy Holland	Flanker	Ireland
Tommy O'Donnell	Flanker	Ireland
Peter O'Mahony	Flanker	Ireland
Niall Ronan	Flanker	Ireland
David Wallace	Flanker	Ireland
Paddy Butler	Number 8	Ireland
James Coughlan	Number 8	Ireland
Denis Leamy	Number 8	Ireland

Player	Position	Union
Conor Murray	Scrum-half	Ireland
Tomás O'Leary	Scrum-half	Ireland
Peter Stringer	Scrum-half	Ireland
Duncan Williams	Scrum-half	Ireland
Declan Cusack	Fly-half	Ireland
Scott Deasy	Fly-half	Ireland
Ian Keatley	Fly-half	Ireland
Ronan O'Gara	Fly-half	Ireland
Danny Barnes	Centre	Ireland
Will Chambers	Centre	Australia
Ivan Dineen	Centre	Ireland
Tom Gleeson	Centre	Ireland
Lifeimi Mafi	Centre	New Zealand
Savenaca Tokula	Centre	New Zealand
Keith Earls	Wing	Ireland
Doug Howlett	Wing	New Zealand
Johne Murphy	Wing	Ireland
Simon Zebo	Wing	Ireland
Denis Hurley	Fullback	Ireland
Felix Jones	Fullback	Ireland
Seán Scanlon	Fullback	Ireland

== Pre-season ==
12 August 2011
19:30

La Rochelle (France)	19–14	(Ireland) Munster
	Report

Stade Marcel-Deflandre
Attendance: 11,000

19 August 2011
19:00

Munster (Ireland)	0–15	(England) Wasps
	Report

Musgrave Park

26 August 2011
19:00

Munster (Ireland)	11–10	(England) London Irish
	Report

Thomond Park

== 2011–12 Pro12 ==
Pro12 Table
Pos	Team	Pld	W	D	L	PF	PA	PD	TF	TA	TB	LB	Pts	Qualification (Note: Qualification for the Heineken Cup is based on each country's allocation, i.e. three highest-ranked Irish teams, three highest-ranked Welsh teams, both Italian teams and both Scottish teams. Because Leinster won the 2012 Heineken Cup Final, Ireland earned an extra Heineken Cup place, which will go to Connacht. Aironi were denied a licence for the 2012–13 season due to financial issues; the newly established Zebre side replaced Aironi in the Pro12 and Heineken Cup.)
1	(Ireland) Leinster (F)	22	18	1	3	568	326	+242	48	28	5	2	81	Play-off place
2	(Wales) Ospreys (C)	22	16	1	5	491	337	+154	44	22	2	3	71	Play-off place
3	(Ireland) Munster (SF)	22	14	1	7	489	367	+122	45	27	5	4	67	Play-off place
4	(Scotland) Glasgow Warriors (SF)	22	13	4	5	445	321	+124	34	23	2	3	65	Play-off place
5	(Wales) Scarlets	22	12	2	8	446	373	+73	43	30	5	5	62	
6	(Ireland) Ulster	22	12	0	10	474	424	+50	53	41	5	3	56	
7	(Wales) Cardiff Blues	22	10	0	12	446	460	−14	43	45	5	5	50	
8	(Ireland) Connacht	22	7	1	14	321	433	−112	27	36	0	7	37	
9	(Wales) Newport Gwent Dragons	22	7	1	14	370	474	−104	27	41	1	5	36	
10	(Italy) Benetton Treviso	22	7	0	15	419	558	−139	41	57	3	5	36	
11	(Scotland) Edinburgh	22	6	1	15	454	588	−134	42	65	2	4	32	
12	(Italy) Aironi	22	4	0	18	289	551	−262	22	54	1	5	22	

Updated to match(es) played on 5 May 2012. Source: RaboDirect PRO12
Rules for classification: If teams are level at any stage, tiebreakers are applied in the following order:
1. number of matches won;
2. the difference between points for and points against;
3. the number of tries scored;
4. the most points scored;
5. the difference between tries for and tries against;
6. the fewest red cards received;
7. the fewest yellow cards received.
  (C) Champions; (F) Lost in the final; (SF) Lost in the semi-finals
  Notes:

3 September 2011
19:45

Munster (Ireland)	20–12	(Wales) Newport Gwent Dragons
	Report

Musgrave Park
Attendance: 7,252
Referee: Stefano Penne

9 September 2011
19:30

Glasgow Warriors (Scotland)	12–23	(Ireland) Munster
	Report

Firhill Stadium
Attendance: 2,914

17 September 2011
19:45

Munster (Ireland)	35–12	(Wales) Scarlets
	Report

Musgrave Park
Attendance: 7,648
Referee: Andy Macpherson

23 September 2011
19:05

Cardiff Blues (Wales)	13–18	(Ireland) Munster
	Report

Cardiff City Stadium
Attendance: 5,466

30 September 2011
19:30

Edinburgh (Scotland)	29–14	(Ireland) Munster
	Report

Murrayfield
Attendance: 3,467

8 October 2011
19:30

Munster (Ireland)	13–17	(Wales) Ospreys
	Report

Thomond Park
Attendance: 16,599
Referee: James Jones

28 October 2011
20:30

Munster (Ireland)	18–6	(Italy) Aironi
	Report

Musgrave Park
Attendance: 8,742
Referee: Peter Allan

4 November 2011
20:00

Leinster (Ireland)	24–19	(Ireland) Munster
	Report

Aviva Stadium
Attendance: 48,365

26 November 2011
20:30

Munster (Ireland)	34–17	(Scotland) Edinburgh
	Report

Thomond Park
Attendance: 18,200

3 December 2011
18:30

Ospreys (Wales)	19–13	(Ireland) Munster
	Report

Liberty Stadium
Attendance: 5,783
Referee: Peter Allan

26 December 2011
19:45

Munster (Ireland)	24–9	(Ireland) Connacht
	Report

Thomond Park
Attendance: 21,030

30 December 2011
19:05

Ulster (Ireland)	33–17	(Ireland) Munster
	Report

Ravenhill
Attendance: 11,379

7 January 2012
20:15

Munster (Ireland)	29–11	(Italy) Treviso
	Report

Thomond Park
Attendance: 16,816
Referee: Nigel Owens

18 February 2012
16:15

Treviso (Italy)	14–35	(Ireland) Munster
	Report

Stadio Comunale di Monigo
Attendance: 4,200

24 February 2012
19:05

Munster (Ireland)	16–13	(Wales) Cardiff Blues
	Report

Thomond Park
Attendance: 19,545

3 March 2012
18:30

Newport Gwent Dragons (Wales)	14–24	(Ireland) Munster
	Report

Rodney Parade
Attendance: 6,129
Referee: Carlo Damasco

11 March 2012
15:00

Aironi (Italy)	21–17	(Ireland) Munster
	Report

Stadio Luigi Zaffanella
Attendance: 3,000

24 March 2012
19:45

Connacht (Ireland)	16–20	(Ireland) Munster
	Report

Galway Sportsgrounds

31 March 2012
19:30

Munster (Ireland)	9–18	(Ireland) Leinster
	Report

Thomond Park
Attendance: 26,500
Referee: Nigel Owens

14 April 2012
19:15

Munster (Ireland)	35–29	(Scotland) Glasgow Warriors
	Report

Musgrave Park
Attendance: 7,942
Referee: Nigel Owens

21 April 2012
18:30

Scarlets (Wales)	20–20	(Ireland) Munster
	Report

Parc y Scarlets
Attendance: 10,741
Referee: Alain Rolland

5 May 2012
19:30

Munster (Ireland)	36–8	(Ireland) Ulster
	Report

Thomond Park
Attendance: 19,362
Referee: Alain Rolland

=== Play-offs ===
==== Semi-final ====
11 May 2012
19:35

Ospreys (Wales)	45–10	(Ireland) Munster
	Report

Liberty Stadium
Attendance: 10,026
Referee: Alain Rolland

== 2011–12 Heineken Cup ==
=== Pool 1 ===
Team	P	W	D	L	Tries for	Tries against	Try diff	Points for	Points against	Points diff	TB	LB	Pts
(Ireland) Munster	6	6	0	0	14	10	+4	163	118	+45	1	0	25
(Wales) Scarlets	6	3	0	3	12	9	+3	119	124	−5	1	2	15
(England) Northampton Saints	6	2	0	4	18	16	+2	176	160	+16	2	2	12
(France) Castres	6	1	0	5	10	19	−9	111	167	−56	1	2	7

12 November 2011

Munster (Ireland)	23–21	(England) Northampton Saints
	Report

Thomond Park
Attendance: 25,600
Referee: Nigel Owens

19 November 2011

Castres (France)	24–27	(Ireland) Munster
	Report

Stade Ernest-Wallon
Attendance: 13,500
Referee: Wayne Barnes

10 December 2011

Scarlets (Wales)	14–17	(Ireland) Munster
	Report

Parc y Scarlets
Attendance: 13,183
Referee: Romain Poite

18 December 2011

Munster (Ireland)	19–13	(Wales) Scarlets
	Report

Thomond Park
Attendance: 25,600
Referee: Dave Pearson

14 January 2012

Munster (Ireland)	26–10	(France) Castres
	Report

Thomond Park
Attendance: 25,600
Referee: A. Small

21 January 2012

Northampton Saints (England)	36–51	(Ireland) Munster
	Report

Stadium MK
Attendance: 22,220
Referee: Romain Poite

=== Quarter-final ===
8 April 2012

Munster (Ireland)	16–22	(Ireland) Ulster
	Report

Thomond Park
Attendance: 26,000
Referee: Romain Poite
