= 2016–17 Munster Rugby season =

- Ground(s): Thomond Park (Capacity: 25,600); Irish Independent Park (Capacity: 9,500)
- Director of Rugby: Rassie Erasmus
- Coach: Anthony Foley (Until 16 October 2016)
- Captain: Peter O'Mahony
- League: Pro12
- 2016–17: 1st (runners-up)
1st kit	2nd kit	3rd kit

The 2016–17 Munster Rugby season was Munster's sixteenth season competing in the Pro12, alongside which they also competed in the European Rugby Champions Cup. It was Anthony Foley's third season as head coach and Rassie Erasmus's first season as director of rugby.

== Events ==
In August 2016, Munster started using the new central training base at the University of Limerick campus, thus marking an end to the days of splitting training between Cork and Limerick.

Munster opened their pre-season with a 17–0 victory over Zebre in a pre-season friendly at Waterford Regional Sports Centre on 19 August.

The new Pro12 season was launched on 23 August at the Aviva Stadium. Munster began the new season on 3 September with an away game against Scarlets.

On 26 August, Munster defeated Worcester in their final pre-season friendly at Musgrave Park, scoring seven-tries during the game.

On 16 October 2016, head coach Anthony Foley died suddenly while in Paris with Munster. The team was preparing to face Racing 92 in their opening game of the 2016–17 European Rugby Champions Cup. The match was postponed as a result of Foley's death.

On 22 October Munster paid tribute to the late Anthony Foley with a 38-17 bonus-point win over Glasgow in the European Champions Cup. A minutes silence was observed before the match during which a special tribute took place in the West Stand with the words "AXEL" spelled out with the number 8 on either side. The Munster Rugby Supporter's Club Choir performed 'There Is An Isle', and soprano Sinead O'Brien joined the Choir to perform 'Stand Up And Fight.

On 10 December, Munster defeated Leicester 38–0 at Thomond Park in their second European Rugby Champions Cup game of the season to go top of the pool with ten points after two games.

Over the Christmas period, Munster defeated Leinster at Thomond Park on 26 December 29–17 to move five points clear of them at the top of the Pro12. They followed up that victory with a 16–9 victory over Connacht on 31 December at the Galway Sportsgrounds.

On 7 January, Munster played the re-arranged game against Racing 92 in Paris and had a bonus point victory by 32–7.

On 14 January, Francis Saili scored the winning try in Munster's 12–14 away win against Glasgow Warriors, a win that secured Munster's place in the quarter-finals of the 2016–17 European Rugby Champions Cup. It was the 11th win out of the last 12 matches for Munster.

In March, it was announced that Donnacha Ryan would leave Munster at the end of the season to join Racing 92.

On 1 April, Munster reached their first European Champions Cup semi-final in three years with a 41–16 victory over Toulouse.

On 22 April, Munster played Saracens in the European Champions Cup semi-final at the Aviva Stadium. They lost the game 26–10 to go out of the competition. Munster minus the injured Conor Murray scored the first penalty of the game but Saracens took control of the game and scored two tries to win comfortably in the end. It was also confirmed that coach Rassie Erasmus would remain in charge for the next season after much speculation that he would return to South-Africa.

On 4 May, Tyler Bleyendaal was named as the Munster Player of the Year at an awards ceremony in Cork. The ceremony was attended by 250 guests with 11 awards presented on the day.

On 20 May, Munster defeated the Ospreys by 23–3 in the Pro12 playoff semi-final to advance to the 2017 Pro12 Grand Final against Scarlets at the Aviva Stadium on 27 May. The match was Donnacha Ryan's and Francis Saili's final appearance for Munster at Thomond Park.

On 27 May, Munster lost the 2017 Pro12 Grand Final to Scarlets 46–22.

== Coaching and management staff 2016–17 ==
Position	Name	Nationality
Director of Rugby	Rassie Erasmus	South Africa
Head coach	Anthony Foley	Ireland
Defence Coach	Jacques Nienaber	South Africa
Team manager	Niall O'Donovan	Ireland
Scrum Coach	Jerry Flannery	Ireland
Technical coach	Felix Jones	Ireland
Head of Fitness	Aled Walters	Wales
Strength & conditioning coach	Aidan O'Connell	Ireland
Strength & conditioning coach	Adam Sheehan	Ireland
Performance analyst	George Murray	Ireland
Operations manager	Bryan Murphy	Ireland

== Senior Playing Squad 2016–17 ==
=== Players In ===
- (Ireland) Sammy Arnold from (Ireland) Ulster
- (Ireland) John Andress from (Scotland) Edinburgh
- (Ireland) Darren O'Shea from (England) Worcester Warriors
- (South Africa) Jean Kleyn from (South Africa) Stormers
- (South Africa) Jaco Taute from (South Africa) Stormers / Western Province
- (Ireland) Collie O'Shea from (Ireland) Leinster
- (Ireland) Steve Crosbie from (New Zealand) Wanganui
- (New Zealand) Rhys Marshall from (New Zealand) Chiefs
- (South Africa) Thomas du Toit from (South Africa) Sharks

=== Players Out ===
- (Ireland) Jordan Coghlan to (England) Nottingham
- (Ireland) Gearoid Lyons to (England) Nottingham
- (Ireland) Shane Buckley to (England) Nottingham
- (Ireland) Jack Cullen to (England) London Scottish
- (Ireland) Cathal Sheridan to (Ireland) UL Bohemians
- (South Africa) BJ Botha to (France) Lyon
- (Ireland) Johnny Holland retired
- (Ireland) Denis Hurley released
- (South Africa) Gerhard van den Heever to (Japan) Yamaha Jubilo

Note: Flags indicate national union under World Rugby eligibility rules. Players may hold more than one non-World Rugby nationality.

Player	Position	Union
Duncan Casey	Hooker	Ireland
Rhys Marshall	Hooker	New Zealand
Kevin O'Byrne	Hooker	Ireland
Niall Scannell	Hooker	Ireland
**Mike Sherry**	Hooker	Ireland
John Andress	Prop	Ireland
**Stephen Archer**	Prop	Ireland
**James Cronin**	Prop	Ireland
Thomas du Toit	Prop	South Africa
**Dave Kilcoyne**	Prop	Ireland
Peter McCabe	Prop	Ireland
**John Ryan**	Prop	Ireland
**Mark Chisholm**	Lock	Australia
**Dave Foley**	Lock	Ireland
**Billy Holland**	Lock	Ireland
Jean Kleyn	Lock	South Africa
John Madigan	Lock	Ireland
Seán McCarthy	Lock	Ireland
Darren O'Shea	Lock	Ireland
**Donnacha Ryan**	Lock	Ireland
Dave O'Callaghan	Flanker	Ireland
**Tommy O'Donnell**	Flanker	Ireland
**Peter O’Mahony** (c)	Flanker	Ireland
**Robin Copeland**	Number 8	Ireland
**Jack O'Donoghue**	Number 8	Ireland
**CJ Stander**	Number 8	Ireland

Player	Position	Union
Angus Lloyd	Scrum-half	Ireland
**Conor Murray**	Scrum-half	Ireland
**Tomás O'Leary**	Scrum-half	Ireland
Cathal Sheridan	Scrum-half	Ireland
Te Aihe Toma	Scrum-half	New Zealand
Duncan Williams	Scrum-half	Ireland
Tyler Bleyendaal	Fly-half	New Zealand
Steve Crosbie	Fly-half	Ireland
**Ian Keatley**	Fly-half	Ireland
Sammy Arnold	Centre	Ireland
Cian Bohane	Centre	Ireland
David Johnston	Centre	Ireland
Collie O'Shea	Centre	Ireland
**Francis Saili**	Centre	New Zealand
Rory Scannell	Centre	Ireland
**Jaco Taute**	Centre	South Africa
Andrew Conway	Wing	Ireland
**Keith Earls**	Wing	Ireland
Ronan O'Mahony	Wing	Ireland
Alex Wootton	Wing	Ireland
Darren Sweetnam	Fullback	Ireland
**Simon Zebo**	Fullback	Ireland

- Internationally capped players in **bold**.
- Players qualified to play for Ireland on residency or dual nationality. *
- Irish provinces are currently limited to four non-Irish eligible (NIE) players and one non-Irish qualified player (NIQ or "Project Player").

== 2016–17 Pro12 ==
3 September 2016
15:00

Scarlets (Wales)	13–23	(Ireland) Munster
Try: G. Davies 31' c Con: Patchell (1/1); Pen: Patchell (2/4) 26', 47'	Report	Try: Cronin 18' c O'Mahony 29' c Con: Bleyendaal (2/2); Pen: Bleyendaal (2/3) 37', 53'; Keatley (1/1)

Parc y Scarlets
Attendance: 6,107
Referee: Lloyd Linton (SRU)

9 September 2016
19:35

(1 BP) Munster (Ireland)	23–24	(Wales) Cardiff Blues
Try: Conway 9' c Kilcoyne 61' c Con: Keatley (2/2); Pen: Keatley (3/3) 29', 54', 71'	Report	Try: James (2) 7' c, 35' c Fish 67' c Con: Anscombe (2/2); Shingler (1/1); Pen: Anscombe (1/2) 14'

Irish Independent Park
Attendance: 7,405
Referee: Ian Davies (WRU)

17 September 2016
17:15

(1 BP) Newport Gwent Dragons (Wales)	16–20	(Ireland) Munster
Try: Amos 32' c Con: O'Brien (1/1) 32'; Pen: O'Brien (3/3) 14', 49', 54'	Report	Try: Kleyn 20' c Bohane 56' c Con: Bleyendaal (2/2) 20', 56'; Pen: Bleyendaal (2/2) 11', 51'

Rodney Parade
Attendance: 3,841
Referee: Dudley Phillips (IRFU)

24 September 2016
15:00

(1 BP) Munster (Ireland)	28–14	(Scotland) Edinburgh
Try: Murray (2) 27' c, 38' c Oliver 42' c O'Callaghan 57' c Con: Bleyendaal (4/4) 27', 38', 42', 57'	Report	Try: Dean 23' c Hardie 67' c Con: Weir (1/1) 23'; Kinghorn (1/1) 67'

Thomond Park
Attendance: 12,826
Referee: Ben Whitehouse (WRU)

1 October 2016
17:00

(1 BP) Munster (Ireland)	49–5	(Italy) Zebre
Try: Sweetnam 2' c Murray 22' c Stander (2) 28' c, 78' c Zebo 31' c Penalty try 52' c Archer 63' c Con: Bleyendaal (4/4); Keatley (3/3)	Report	Try: Di Giulio 71' m

Thomond Park
Attendance: 11,737
Referee: Dan Jones (WRU)

8 October 2016
14:05

Leinster (Ireland)	25–14	(Ireland) Munster
Try: Nacewa (2) 35' m, 55' c Gibson-Park 68' c Con: Sexton (1/1) 55'; Nacewa (1/1) 68'; Pen: Sexton (2/2) 6', 10'	Report	Try: O'Mahony 26' c Taute 74' c Con: Bleyendaal (2/2) 26', 74'

Aviva Stadium
Attendance: 40,527
Referee: David Wilkinson (IRFU)

28 October 2016
19:35

(1 BP) Ulster (Ireland)	14-15	(Ireland) Munster
Try: Piutau 4' c Lyttle '34 c Con: Jackson (2/2) 5', 35'	Report	Try: Scannell 40' c Taute 63' c Con: Scannell (1/1) 64'; Drop: Scannell 74'

Kingspan Stadium

4 November 2016
19:35

(1 BP) Munster (Ireland)	33–0	(Wales) Ospreys
Try: Kilcoyne (2) 8' c, 69' c Sweetnam 14' c O'Mahony 54' m Copeland 78' c Con: Bleyendaal (4/5) 8', 14', 69', 78'	Report

Irish Independent Park
Attendance: 8,008
Referee: Marius Mitrea (FIR)

26 November 2016
14:00

(1 BP) Munster (Ireland)	46-3	(Italy) Benetton Treviso
Try: Copeland 20' c Conway 25' m, 34' c O'Shea 42' c R. O'Mahony 64' m, 71' m Wootton 69'; Con: Bleyendaal (3/5) 21', 35', 43'; Keatley (1/2) 69'; Pen: Bleyendaal (1/1) 14'	Report	Pen: McKinley (1/1) 8'

Stadio Sergio Lanfranchi

2 December 2016
19:35

(1 BP) Glasgow Warriors (Scotland)	15–16	(Ireland) Munster
Try: Price 62' c Grigg 70' m Con: Clegg (1/2) 62'; Pen: Horne (1/1) 16'	Report	Try: Conway 12' c Con: Keatley (1/1) 12'; Pen: Keatley (2/2) 9', 37'; Drop: Keatley (1/1) 77'

Scotstoun Stadium

26 December 2016
17:30

(1 BP) Munster (Ireland)	29–17	(Ireland) Leinster
Try: Zebo 22' c R. O'Mahony 40' c O'Donnell 49' c Stander 56' m Con: Bleyendaal (3/4) 23', 40', 51'; Pen: Bleyendaal (1/1) 61'	Report	Try: Kirchner 17' c Strauss 76' c Con: Nacewa (1/1) 18'; Molony (1/1) 77'; Pen: Nacewa (1/1) 27'

Thomond Park
Attendance: 26,200
Referee: Nigel Owens (WRU)

31 December 2016
17:30

(1 BP) Connacht (Ireland)	9–16	(Ireland) Munster
Pen: Carty (3/4) 30', 50', 76'	Report	Try: Marshall 56' c Con: Keatley (1/1) 57'; Pen: Keatley (2/3) 2', 39'; Drop: Keatley (1/2) 68'

Galway Sportsgrounds
Attendance: 8,090
Referee: David Wilkinson (IRFU)

3 February 2017
15:00

(1 BP) Edinburgh (Scotland)	9–10	(Ireland) Munster
Pen: Tovey (3) 7', 24', 34'	Report	Try: O’Mahony 15' c Con: Bleyendaal (1/1) 16'; Pen: Bleyendaal 66'

New Myreside
Attendance: 5,235
Referee: Ben Whitehouse (WRU)

10 February 2017
19:35

(1 BP) Munster (Ireland)	45–17	(Wales) Newport Gwent Dragons
Try: Taute (2) 14' c, 28' c Conway 20' c Penalty try 40' c Kilcoyne 64' c R. O'Mahony 80' c Con: Bleyendaal (6/6) 14', 20', 28', 40', 64', 80'; Pen: Bleyendaal (1/1) 7'	Report	Try: Buckley 36' c Dee 60' c Con: D. Jones (2/2) 36', 60'; Pen: D. Jones (1/1) 12'

Irish Independent Park
Attendance: 8,008
Referee: Mike Adamson (SRU)

18 February 2017
17:15

(1 BP) Ospreys (Wales)	23–25	(Ireland) Munster
Try: Dirksen 5' c Fonotia 13' c Con: S. Davies (2/2) 5', 13'; Pen: S. Davies (3/3) 24', 40', 59'	Report	Try: O'Donoghue 36' m Saili 40' c Kilcoyne 78' c Con: Bleyendaal (2/3) 40', 78'; Pen: Bleyendaal (2/2) 4', 29'

Liberty Stadium
Attendance: 8,782
Referee: Marius Mitrea

24 February 2017
19:35

Munster (Ireland)	21–30	(Wales) Scarlets
Try: Taute 13' c Sweetnam 23' c Oliver 30' c Con: Bleyendaal (3/3) 13', 23', 30'	Report	Try: Parkes 56' c McNicholl 59' c van der Merwe 62' c Con: D. Jones (3/3) 56', 59', 62'; Pen: D. Jones (3/3) 3', 16', 53'

Thomond Park
Attendance: 16,742
Referee: Daniel Jones

4 March 2017
17:15

Cardiff Blues (Wales)	13–23	(Ireland) Munster
Try: Summerhill 47' c Con: Shingler (1/1) 48'; Pen: Shingler (2/2) 21', 33'	Report	Try: Saili 51' c Oliver 76' c Con: R. Scannell (2/2) 52', 77'; Pen: R. Scannell (2/3) 25', 66'; Drop: R. Scannell (1/1) 75'

BT Cardiff Arms Park
Attendance: 6,546
Referee: Mike Adamson (SRU)

25 March 2017
15:00

Zebre (Italy)	14–50	(Ireland) Munster (1 BP)
Try: Minnie 30' c Greeff 56' c Con: Violi (1/1) 30'; Bordoli (1/1) 56'	Report	Try: N. Scannell 3' c O'Donnell 19' c R. O'Mahony (2) 26' c, 51' m R. Scannell 47' c Cronin (2) 62' c, 71' c Con: Bleyendaal (4/5) 3', 19', 26', 47'; R. Scannell (2/2) 62', 71'; Pen: Bleyendaal (1/1) 40'

Stadio Sergio Lanfranchi
Attendance: 1,240
Referee: Sean Gallagher (IRFU)

8 April 2017
19:35

Munster (Ireland)	10–7	(Scotland) Glasgow Warriors (1 BP)
Try: Cronin 4' c Con: Bleyendaal (1/1) 5'; Pen: R. Scannell (1/1) 60'	Report	Try: Hogg 68' c Con: Russell (1/1) 69'

Irish Independent Park
Attendance: 8,008
Referee: Nigel Owens (WRU)

15 April 2017
15:00

Munster (Ireland)	22–20	(Ireland) Ulster (1 BP)
Try: Lloyd 6' c Earls 61' m O'Callaghan 69' c Con: Keatley (1/1) 7'; Bleyendaal (1/2) 71'; Pen: Keatley (1/1) 36'	Report	Try: Best 3' c L. Marshall 64' c Con: Jackson (2/2) 4', 65'; Pen: Jackson (2/3) 13', 52'

Thomond Park
Attendance: 20,047
Referee: Marius Mitrea (FIR)

29 April 2017
19:05

Benetton Treviso (Italy)	14–34	(Ireland) Munster (1 BP)
Try: Odiete 49' c Montauriol 80'+1; Con: McKinley (1/1) 50'; Tebaldi (1/1) 80'+1	Report	Try: Sweetnam (2) 25' m, 70' c Zebo 32' c Wootton 64' m O'Donoghue 67' c Con: Bleyendaal (3/5) 33', 68', 71; Pen: Bleyendaal (1/1) 41'

Stadio Comunale di Monigo
Referee: Ian Davies (WRU)

6 May 2017
17:15

(1 BP) Munster (Ireland)	50–14	(Ireland) Connacht
Try: Earls 8' c O'Donoghue 27' c Conway (2) 33' c, 54' c Cronin 43' c Saili 70' c Oliver 80' m Con: Keatley (6/7) 8', 28', 34', 44', 54', 70'; Pen: Keatley (1/1) 25'	Report	Try: Kelleher 51' c Dawai 64' c Con: Ronaldson (2/2) 52', 65'

Thomond Park
Referee: David Wilkinson (IRFU)

=== Play-offs ===
==== Semi-finals ====
20 May 2017
18:15

Munster (Ireland)	23–3	(Wales) Ospreys
Try: Saili 26' m Zebo 61' c Conway 75' m Con: Bleyendaal (1/3) 62'; Pen: Bleyendaal (2/2) 67', 41'+3	Report	Pen: Biggar (1/2) 8'

Thomond Park
Attendance: 18,332
Referee: Luke Pearce (RFU)

==== Final ====
27 May 2017
18:15

Munster (Ireland)	22–46	(Wales) Scarlets
Try: Bleyendaal 40' c Conway 75' m Earls 78' c Con: Bleyendaal (1/1) 41'; Keatley (1/2) 78'; Pen: Bleyendaal (1/1) 7'	Report	Try: L. Williams 9' m S. Evans 20' c G. Davies 27' c Beirne 31' c van der Merwe 70' c Ja. Davies 80'; Con: Patchell (3/4) 21', 28', 32'; L. Williams (2/2) 72', 80'+1; Pen: Patchell (2/2) 19', 45'

Aviva Stadium
Attendance: 44,558
Referee: Nigel Owens (WRU)

== 2016–17 European Rugby Champions Cup ==
Munster faced Racing 92, Glasgow Warriors and Leicester Tigers in Pool 1 of the 2016-17 Champions Cup. They were seeded in the bottom tier following their sixth-placed position in the 2015–16 Pro12.

Team	P	W	D	L	PF	PA	Diff	TF	TA	TB	LB	Pts
(Ireland) Munster (2)	6	5	0	1	160	64	+96	18	4	3	1	24
(Scotland) Glasgow Warriors (6)	6	4	0	2	160	86	+74	18	10	2	1	19
(England) Leicester Tigers	6	2	0	4	61	190	–129	3	23	0	0	8
(France) Racing 92	6	1	0	5	89	130	–41	12	14	1	0	5

22 October 2016
13:00

(1 BP) Munster (Ireland)	38–17	(Scotland) Glasgow Warriors
Try: Bleyendaal 4' c Taute 14' c Zebo 30' c Penalty try 47' c Scannell 75' c Con: Bleyendaal (4/4) 4', 14', 30', 47'; Keatley (1/1) 75'; Pen: Bleyendaal (1/1) 7'	Report	Try: MacArthur 66' c Bennett 70' c Con: S. Hogg (2/2) 66', 70'; Pen: Russell (1/2) 10'

Thomond Park
Attendance: 25,600
Referee: Jérôme Garcès (FFR)

10 December 2016
15:15

(1 BP) Munster (Ireland)	38–0	(England) Leicester Tigers
Try: Zebo 35' c Taute 49' c, 56' m Penalty try 71' c Con: Bleyendaal (3/4) 36', 50', 71'; Pen: Bleyendaal (4/5) 10', 15', 23', 27'	Report

Thomond Park
Attendance: 25,600
Referee: Romain Poite (FFR)

17 December 2016
15:15

Leicester Tigers (England)	18–16	(Ireland) Munster (1 BP)
Pen: O. Williams (6/6) 33', 39', 49', 54', 66', 79'	Report	Try: Scannell 74' c Con: Bleyendaal (1/1) 74'; Pen: Bleyendaal (3/5) 9', 18', 44'

Welford Road
Attendance: 24,213
Referee: Pascal Gaüzère (FFR)

7 January 2017
15:45

Racing 92 (France)	7–32	(Ireland) Munster (1 BP)
Try: Voisin 63' c Con: Carter (1/1) 64'	Report	Try: Zebo 22' m Stander 35' c Conway 39' c N. Scannell 54' c Con: Bleyendaal (3/4) 36', 40', 55'; Pen: Bleyendaal (2/2) 14, 33'

Stade Yves-du-Manoir
Attendance: 9,233
Referee: Matthew Carley (RFU)

14 January 2017
17:30

(1 BP) Glasgow Warriors (Scotland)	12–14	(Ireland) Munster
Pen: Russell (3/3) 13', 47', 59'; Hogg (1/2) 32'	Report	Try: Saili 71' m Pen: Bleyendaal (3/4) 20', 34', 50'

Scotstoun Stadium
Attendance: 7,351
Referee: Luke Pearce (RFU)

21 January 2017
17:30

Munster (Ireland)	22–10	(France) Racing 92
Try: Zebo 36' c R. O'Mahony 48' c Keatley 69' m Con: Bleyendaal (2/3) 37', 49'; Pen: Bleyendaal (1/1) 42'	Report	Try: Chavancy 59' c Con: Machenaud (1/1) 60'; Pen: Machenaud (1/2) 40'

Thomond Park
Attendance: 26,200
Referee: Marius Mitrea (FIR)

=== Quarter-final ===
1 April 2017
17:45

Munster (Ireland) (2)	41–16	(7) (France) Toulouse
Try: J. Ryan 4' c Stander 47' m Sweetnam 75' c Conway 79' c Con: Bleyendaal (3/4) 4', 77', 80'; Pen: Bleyendaal (5/5) 9', 26', 42', 52', 74'	Report	Try: Perez 54' c Con: Doussain (1/1) 55'; Pen: Doussain (3/3) 19', 31', 40'

Thomond Park
Attendance: 26,200
Referee: JP Doyle (RFU)

=== Semi-final ===
22 April 2017
15:15

Munster (Ireland)	10–26	(England) Saracens
Try: Stander 80' c Con: Keatley (1/1) 80'; Pen: Bleyendaal (1/2) 7'	Report	Try: M. Vunipola 54' c Wyles 70' c Con: Farrell (2/2) 55', 72'; Pen: Farrell (4/4) 17', 35', 64', 75'

Aviva Stadium
Attendance: 51,300
Referee: Romain Poite (FFR)
