= Christian Brothers College, Cork =

Private boys' school in Ireland

CBC Cork

Location
- Sidney Hill, Wellington Rd., Cork City, Ireland; 51.9036°N 8.4674°W

Information
- Type: Private
- Motto: Certa Bonum Certamen (Fight the Good Fight)
- Religious affiliation: Christianity (Catholic)
- Established: 1888
- Founder: Br. J.D Burke
- Sister school: C.B.C. Monkstown
- Trust: Edmund Rice Schools' Trust
- Principal: David Lordon
- Gender: Boys
- Enrollment: 1000+ (preparatory & secondary combined)
- Nickname: 'Christians'
- School fees: €4,500
- Alumni: Old Christians
- Website: http://www.cbccork.ie

Christian Brothers College, Cork (CBC Cork, colloquially known as Christians) is a fee-paying school under the trusteeship of the Edmund Rice Schools Trust in Cork City, Ireland. As of 2024, the secondary school had over 900 pupils enrolled. The preparatory school, Christian Brothers College Preparatory School, is registered with Tusla as an independent school and not subject to inspection by the Department of Education. CBC Cork's "sister school" in County Dublin is CBC Monkstown.

== History ==
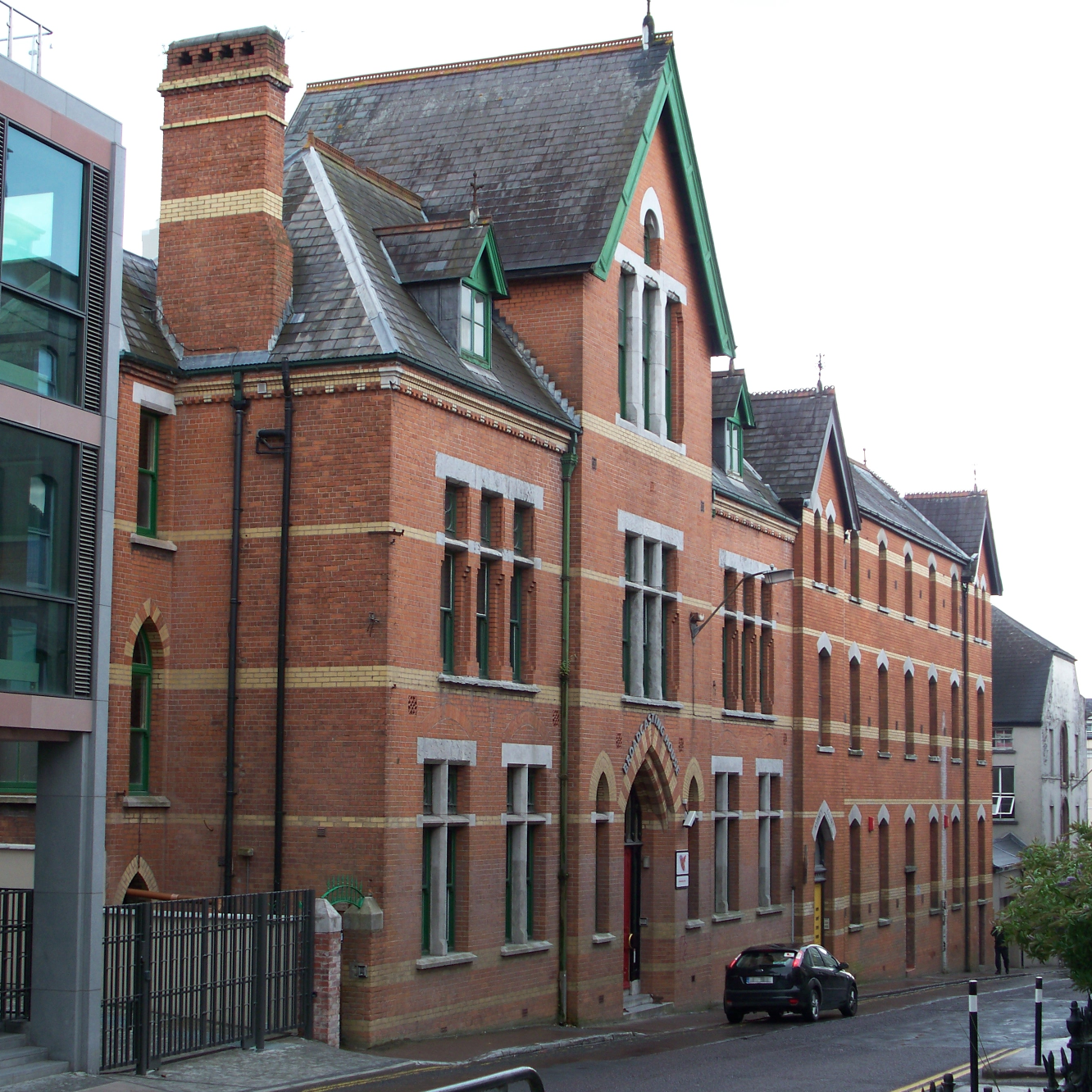
Saint Patrick's Place building

In the mid-19th century, the Vincentian Fathers maintained a seminary at Saint Patrick's Place in Cork, known as the Cork Diocesan Seminary. In 1888, a new seminary with residential accommodation was completed at Farranferris, and the Vincentian ecclesiastical students transferred there. Thomas Alphonsus O'Callaghan, the Catholic Bishop of Cork, invited the Christian Brothers to take charge of the St Patrick's Place establishment. The school operated from the St Patrick's Place site for one hundred years.

A Cork Examiner report from 21 August 1888 covered the official opening, quoting Bishop O'Callaghan as suggestion that the new school would "yet become famous in Cork, and it will be loved by the people". Attendees at the opening included the Mayor of Cork Corporation, John O'Brien, as well as MPs William J. Lane and John Hooper. Br. James Dominic Burke, a pioneer in Irish education, served as the school's founding president that year.

In the Intermediate Education Commission of 1899, chaired by Christopher Palles, CBC Cork was one of nine Roman Catholic schools in Ireland to be interviewed. In a report of the British government's Committee for Education and Social Economy, CBC Cork was named as an example of Catholic boys' education in Ireland, amongst "contributions from the great British public schools" to be featured at the St. Louis International Exhibition of 1904.

In a 2003 Oireachtas debate, Senator Brendan Ryan, derisively referred to the school, along with Belvedere College, PBC Cork, and Clongowes Wood College, as "elitist education". In Where Finbarr Played (published 2011), the academic John A. Murphy also refers to both CBC Cork and PBC Cork as "elitist feeder schools".

The school historically published an annual, titled the Collegian. During World War I, the school produced a special edition, titled Collegian 1917: CBC at the Front.

During World War I, over 300 of the school's past pupils served in the Allied forces, which was relatively unique for an Irish Catholic school. Anthony P. Quinn, writing in Wigs & Guns: Irish Barristers During the Great War, explains that "discipline" and other characteristics beneficial for military service were instilled in 'Christians', in the same manner as public boys' schools in England. The school at this time was noted as "catering for the sons of comfortable families, and, as such could hardly be expected to be a hot-bed of revolutionary ideas". Unlike other Christian Brothers' schools, there existed a "vital thrust" to "support Britain in her hour of peril", and visits by past pupils wearing khaki aided a recruitment drive. Writing in the Irish Examiner, Anthony P. Quinn also stated that schools like CBC were key to providing a "Catholic officer class" in the British Army during WWI. The school is described, in a similar manner, in Steven O'Connor's Irish Officers in the British Forces: 1922-1945 and Turtle Bunbury's The Glorious Madness: Tales of the Irish and the Great War. Several lawyers who had attended the school became officers in the British Army throughout this period. Among those who died in World War I included past pupil and Irish rugby international, Vincent McNamara. However, Sean French, a chemist and noted IRA volunteer in the War of Independence and Irish Civil War, TD, and Lord Mayor of Cork, also attended the school.

After its foundation in 1931, the school's Past Pupils' Union received a letter of "thanks and appreciation" from Pope Pius XI for their initiative. It was edited and sent by then Secretary of State at the Vatican, Cardinal. E. Pacelli (later Pope Pius XII). The letter was reprinted on the front page of the Evening Echo. The school possessed cordial links with the Dominican Fathers in the mid-20th century.

In 1989, a centenary book titled Christians: The First Hundred Years, was published.

The school was reported as being expected to suffer from the cut in state aid to private schools in 2008. In 2009, the school was scrutinised by the Irish Independent for its receipt of state subsidies, along with Blackrock College, Belvedere, Clongowes, Wesley, Mount Anville, King's Hospital, Terenure College, Kilkenny College, and St. Andrew's College.

In April 2013, the Evening Echo referred to it as one of Cork's "most historic and exclusive institutions". In November 2013, President of Ireland, Michael D. Higgins, commemorated the school's 125th anniversary.

The school featured in the top 10 of the Irish Times list of feeder schools for progression to university education in 2017. As of 2019, it reportedly had a 100 percent rate of student progression to university.

== Recent development ==
Marking the centenary in 1988, the college moved from its original site to a new location, one hundred metres away, atop Sidney Hill. A private, non-profit fund was established to build the new premises, in May 1986. The patron of the fund was Peter Barry TD (Minister for Foreign Affairs), and the chairman of the fund was Hugh Coveney TD, also president of the school's Past Pupils' Union that year. The new project was designed by Brian Wain, also a past pupil.

In 1994, the school appointed its first lay principal, Dr. Laurence Jordan, who held the position until 2018. By 2008, the school's annual fees were €3,100 for first year and €2,850 for subsequent years. As of 2023, it was the most expensive day school in County Cork.

Though the Christian Brothers retain a presence on the board of management, as trustees, CBC is now staffed entirely by lay teachers. In addition to its board of management, it is under the stewardship of the Edmund Rice Schools' Trust.

As of January 2019, CBC had over 1000 students in the college, with over 900 at Secondary Level, and approximately 150 at primary level in the preparatory school. The principal of the college (both secondary and preparatory) is David Lordon.

In January 2020, the school was granted permission for the development of a new €12.5m school building alongside Sidney Hill. In an appeal to An Bord Pleanála, a local business man objected to the building. While planning permission was granted for the proposed development in 2020, a review by the board of management and the Edmund Rice Schools' Trust deemed it to be not commercially viable and cancelled the project.

== Sport ==
=== Rugby ===
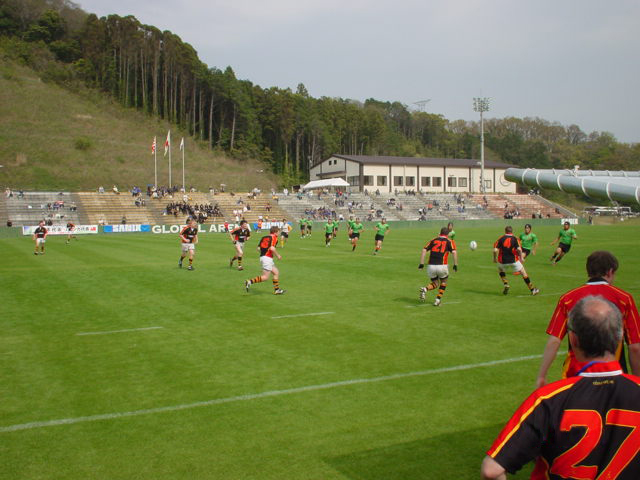
CBC rugby team at Sanix World Rugby Youth Tournament, Global Arena, 2006

The school has been described by the Irish Independent as one of Cork's "rugby union nurseries" and as having "one of Ireland's oldest and most successful established rugby teams". They have won the Munster Schools' Senior Cup thirty-two times, winning its first title in 1909 (where they defeated Rockwell College). Due to the COVID-19 pandemic, they "shared" the 2020 title with Presentation Brothers College. CBC also won the 2016 title after defeating Crescent College in the final. They won the title in 2025, when they defeated PBC Cork, bringing them level with their rivals in overall honours.

The college's main rivals are Presentation Brothers College, Cork (as the two main fee paying all-boys schools in Cork, both share similar histories, student bases, and sporting and academic traditions). In his autobiography, Ronan O'Gara, a past pupil of 'Pres,' refers to 'Christians' as their "arch rivals" from his school days. In 2024, CBC Cork lost both the Junior and Senior Cup finals to PBC Cork. Former Munster Rugby centre, Cian Bohane, went on to claim that both schools provided a "seamless transition" to professional rugby. In 1974, 'Christians' defeated a 'Pres' team which featured Moss Finn, resulting in four wins in a row in the cup for CBC Cork. In Where Miracles Happen: The Story of Thomond Park, the two schools are described as dominating these tournaments for most of the 20th century, regularly meeting each other in cup finals. In 1999, the school won its third Senior Cup in a row, defeating Glenstal Abbey. It is the only school to have attained two four-in-row feats in the competition. However, in 2024, PBC Cork surpassed the joint record it held with CBC Cork when it won its 32nd title, also defeating the school in the final. In 2024, the school also defeated PBC Cork to win both the Munster 'Senior B' Barry Cup, and the Kidney Cup. In 2021, the Senior Cup was named after former Munster Rugby CEO and past pupil, Garrett Fitzgerald. The school has also played matches against the Methodist College, Belfast, in the past.

Historically, the school also played against club and university teams (such as Cork Constitution RFC, Black Prince Boys, Queens College XV, Cork County XV), as well as against schools from outside of the Munster competition circuit, such as Clongowes Wood and the King's Hospital School. The school also played against teams fielded by the Royal Navy. The school also developed a tradition of organising rugby tours in Great Britain.

The school has produced a number of Irish rugby internationals, with some of its earliest, among whom were Harry Jack and Vincent McNamara, predating the First World War. David J. Lane and Basil Maclear, both past pupils, played for Ireland during the Inter-War period. Jimmy McCarthy, regarded contemporaneously as one of Munster and Ireland's greatest-ever rugby players, was also a product of the school. Irish-Canadian rugby player Patrick Parfrey also played for the school as a youth. Paul Anthony Burke, a past pupil, played for Ireland in the 1990s and 2000s. In 2019, the Sunday Independent referred to the school, along with PBC Cork, Belvedere, and Clongowes, as "bulk providers of raw material" for Irish rugby. Past pupils have also played for the British & Irish Lions.

In 1955, Old Christians RFC was founded to provide a sporting and social outlet for past pupils. Regarded as a literal "old boys club" until the 1970s, membership of the rugby club is also open to non-past pupils.

As described by the Rugby Paper UK, the school's past pupils have generated "countless stalwarts" for the Munster Rugby squad. In the 21st century, this has included (among others) Rory Burke, Darragh Hurley, Tomás O'Leary (in 2023, O'Leary was appointed to lead the school's Junior Rugby coaching team), Billy Holland, Stephen Archer, Liam Coombes, Alex McHenry, Ross Noonan, Mark Donnelly, John William Ryan, Cian Hurley, Frank Murphy, Ivan Dineen, Duncan Williams, Scott Buckley, Simon Zebo (who attended both CBC Cork and PBC Cork), James Coughlan and Donncha O'Callaghan. The school's Past Pupils' Union awards rugby union honours caps to notable players.

The school has links with the Old Christians Club, Uruguay, and has previously commemorated the Flight 571 disaster of October 1972. Several of the Uruguayan players, involved in the disaster, had been taught and coached by Br. John (Dicey) O'Reilly (a founding Brother of the Uruguayan school in Montevideo), who was the principal of CBC Cork at the time of the crash. Donal Lenihan, a past pupil and former Irish rugby international, recalled that, once the news had broken, Br. O'Reilly summoned his class to pray for those affected.

Former Munster Rugby player and New Zealand 'All Blacks' international, Jason Holland, has served as a member of the school's rugby coaching team. In 2024, former Munster Rugby out-half, Jonny Holland, was appointed as the school's rugby performance director. In 2023, the Irish Independent stated that the facilities at the school's Lansdowne Sports Complex "are widely regarded as among the best in the country".

=== Other sports ===
The school also participates in other sports, including soccer (association football) and Gaelic games (Gaelic football and hurling).

CBC won the Junior Cup for soccer in 2003 and 2008 (with former professional soccer player, David Meyler, playing with the school during this period). The school later won its first FAI Schools Munster Championship in 2023.

A CBC team reached the final of the Dr. Harty Cup (hurling) in 2019, doing so for the first time in 101 years. The school contributed a total 16 players and 2 coaches to Cork GAA's All-Ireland Senior Hurling Championship bid in 2021, including Robbie Cotter, Padraig Power, Jack Cahalane, Eoin Downey, Robert Downey, Robbie O'Flynn, Shane Barrett, Billy Hennessy and James O'Flynn.

The school won the 1984 Golfing Union of Ireland's Irish Inter-School's Golf Championship.

As of 2023, the "Head of Sport" at the school was Donal O'Mahony.

== Extracurricular activities ==
In addition to rugby and GAA, the school also participates in debating, charitable activities and basketball. Through several fundraising efforts, including the annual Christmas appeal, CBC also supports charities including SHARE, Saint Vincent de Paul, HOPE, Trócaire and Concern. Among the school's charitable activities is the "Zambia Immersion Project", which involves students travelling to Zambia to observe and assist with development work.

== Notable alumni ==
- Peter Barry, Minister for Foreign Affairs (1982–1987), Tánaiste (1987)
- J. Kevin Boland, RC prelate bishop of Savannah
- Raymond Boland, Catholic Bishop of Birmingham, Alabama, USA
- Liam Burke, TD and Lord Mayor of Cork
- Paul Anthony Burke, Irish and Munster Rugby player
- Rory Burke, Munster Rugby player
- Francis Browne, Irish Jesuit
- Mark Cagney, TV and radio broadcaster
- Hugh Coveney, Minister for the Marine (1994–1995), Minister for Defence (1994–1995)
- George Crosbie, Senator and newspaper proprietor
- Aloys Fleischmann, composer, professor of music
- James Christopher Flynn, Nationalist MP
- Sean French, IRA volunteer, TD, and Lord Mayor of Cork
- Capt. Maurice F. Healy, barrister and author
- Darragh Hurley, Munster Rugby player
- Stephen Barnabus Kelleher, mathematician
- Mick Lane, former Lions and Irish rugby international
- Donal Lenihan, former Ireland rugby union captain
- William Linehan, Writer, British diplomat and colonial administrator
- Vincent McNamara, Irish rugby international.
- David Meyler, Irish international footballer
- Dara Murphy, Minister of State (2014–2017)
- Frank Murphy, former Munster rugby player and Leicester Tigers, current Connacht Rugby player
- Noel Murphy (Sr.), Irish rugby union international, Munster Rugby and British and Irish Lions team member
- Noel Murphy (Jr.), Irish rugby union international, Munster Rugby and British and Irish Lions team member
- Jerome Murphy-O'Connor, Irish Dominican priest and biblical scholar
- Donncha O'Callaghan, Irish rugby union international, Munster Rugby and British and Irish Lions team member
- Frank O'Connor, author and translator
- Barry O'Donnell, Irish surgeon and professor
- Gregory O'Donoghue, poet
- Tomás O'Leary, Irish rugby union international and Munster Rugby and British and Irish Lions team member
- Sir Andrew Ryan, British diplomat and colonial administrator
- Patrick Finbar Ryan, Archbishop of Port of Spain, and member of Second Vatican Council
- Denis Vincent Twomey, Professor of Moral Theology
- Chris Walley, actor and recipient of Olivier Award
- Duncan Williams, Munster Rugby player
- James Coughlan, Munster Rugby and Section Paloise player
