= Vincent McNamara =

British Army officer & Ireland international rugby union player

- Born: 11 April 1891 Blackrock, County Cork, Ireland
- Died: 29 November 1915 (aged 24) Suvla Bay, Gallipoli, Ottoman Empire
- Height: 5 ft 8 in (1.73 m)
- Weight: 11 st 6 lb (160 lb; 73 kg)
- School: Christian Brothers College, Cork
- University: University College Cork

Rugby union career
- Position: Scrum-half
Amateur team(s)
Years	Team	Apps	(Points)
1911–1914	University College Cork RFC		
Senior career
Years	Team	Apps	(Points)
- Munster
International career
Years	Team	Apps	(Points)
1914	Ireland	3	(3)
- Military career
- Allegiance: United Kingdom
- Branch: British Army
- Service years: 1915
- Rank: 2/Lt
- Unit: Royal Engineers
- Conflicts: World War I; Gallipoli campaign; Suvla Bay †

Vincent McNamara (11 April 1891 – 29 November 1915) was a rugby union player who represented Ireland. He died at Suvla Bay, Gallipoli, Turkey, during World War I.

== Early life ==
Vincent McNamara was born in Blackrock, County Cork, one of the seven children of Catholic solicitor Patrick and Margaret McNamara to have survived infancy. He went to school at Christian Brothers College, Cork from 1904 to 1911, and then studied engineering at University College Cork.

== Rugby career ==
After winning the Munster Schools Cup in 1911 with his half-back partner Henry Walter Jack, the pair moved to senior rugby with UCC. McNamara was victorious in 44 of his 67 appearances for UCC, lifting the Munster Senior Cup in 1912 and 1913, and was selected to play three matches at scrum-half for Ireland. His debut came in the 1914 Five Nations Championship against England at Twickenham, the second of Ireland's games in the tournament on 14 February, and one of the match's three Irish debutants. The next game was against Scotland, at home on 28 February. Making his debut that day at fly-half was his school, club and Munster partner Henry Walter Jack, the pair known as "Macky and Jacky". Ireland won the game two tries to nil, with McNamara scoring one of the tries.

The last of McNamara's international appearances was against Wales on 14 March 1914 at Balmoral Showgrounds in Belfast. Reputedly the most violent rugby match in history between Ireland and Wales, it came to be known as the "Balmoral Brawl", with the Scottish referee, J Tulloch, allowing the fighting to continue through the game. The game was played in heavy rain, making it difficult to handle the ball. Ireland scored a try in the first three minutes to take the lead. The Welsh equalised before half time and in the second half scored a further two tries, one converted. Wales won 3–11 and its pack was rewarded by Irish critics with the nickname 'The Terrible Eight'. Meanwhile, the Welsh press reported: "In the concluding stages there was a slight tendency of rough play on the part of the Irish forwards.

=== International appearances ===
Opposition	Score	Result	Date	Venue	Ref(s)
England	17–12	Lost	14 February 1914	Twickenham	
Scotland	6–0	Won	28 February 1914	Lansdowne Road	
Wales	3–11	Lost	14 March 1914	Belfast	

== Military service and death ==
McNamara was studying engineering at UCC at the outbreak of the First World War, and was a cadet in the Officers Training Corps. He was commissioned second lieutenant in the Royal Engineers on 20 January 1915, and posted to Gallipoli in June of that year.

On 29 November 1915, after McNamara had detonated a charge under the mines which Turkish forces were using to deploy tear gas, he went down to investigate. However, he went before the gas had dispersed and was killed by it.

== See also ==
- List of international rugby union players killed in action during the First World War
