= Ger Slattery =

Rugby union career
- Position: Hooker
Amateur team(s)
Years	Team	Apps	(Points)
- Young Munster
Senior career
Years	Team	Apps	(Points)
2013–14	Munster	4	(10)
- Correct as of 24 Feb 2014
International career
Years	Team	Apps	(Points)
2007	Ireland U20	4	(0)
2013	Ireland Club XV	6	(10)
- Correct as of 27 Dec 2013

Ger Slattery is an Irish rugby union player. He plays as a hooker. Slattery plays his club rugby with Young Munster in Division 1A of the Ulster Bank All-Ireland League.

== Munster ==
Slattery made his senior Munster debut on 27 December 2013, coming on as a replacement against Connacht in the Pro12, having been a late call-up to the team after Damien Varley took ill. He scored a brace of tries in Munster's 36–8 win against Zebre on 15 February 2014.

== Ireland ==
Slattery started for the Ireland Club XV that beat England Counties XV 30-20 on 8 February 2013, scoring a try during the game.
