= Irish Universities Rugby Union =

Representative body for university rugby union in Ireland

Ireland Students Rugby Team
- Union: Irish Universities Rugby Union (affiliated to the Irish Rugby Football Union)
- Emblem: The Shamrock on the cross of Saint Patrick with white background
- Ground: Aviva Stadium
- President: Trevor Ringland (QUB RFC)
- Coach: David O'Mahony (UCC RFC)
1st kit	2nd kit

The Irish Universities Rugby Union (IURU) is the representative body for University Rugby Union in Ireland. The Union was established in 1904 and currently consists of the following members; University College Dublin RFC, Dublin University FC, Queen's University RFC, University College Cork RFC, NUI Galway R.F.C., Maynoooth University R.F.C., University of Ulster Coleraine RFC, Dublin City University. In addition University of Limerick annually competes in IURU competitions.

The IURU organises and manages the Ireland Students Representative Rugby Team which competes annually. While the Irish Universities & Students sides had played games against other Irish and English representative sides since the 1930s the first game against International opposition was played against the Scottish Universities side in 1954. In the past the predecessor of the Ireland Student side the Irish Combined Universities played against all the major southern hemisphere full international touring sides, e.g. playing and beating the Springboks in 1965 in Thomond Park therefore making them the first Irish side to beat an international touring team. The Combined Universities have also played against Australia in 1968 and New Zealand in 1974. The Combined Universities have toured overseas on 4 occasions, to New Zealand in 1978, to Japan & South Korea in 1987, to South Africa in 1994 and to Australia in 1997.

Uniquely the Combined Universities team players wear their respective universities clubs socks with the green international jersey.

Since the advent of professional rugby, matches against full senior international sides have become a thing of the past, however the Irish Universities Rugby Union has continued to arrange annual international fixtures against other National University and Student sides from England, Scotland, France and Wales and against IRFU developmental sides. The most recent Ireland Student fixture against the English Students was held in April 2017, at the Oxford University playing grounds on Iffley Road. The Irish team ably led by captain Darren Hudson fought out a thrilling 9 try, 36 all draw with the English Students.

2018 saw the Irish Students side see victory against the Scottish Students. The captain, former Munster player Cian Bohane, led the team in Edinburgh to a hard-fought 33–17 win.

The IURU also organizes four domestic tournaments across the full spectrum of performance and participation grades. The following four competitions are held on an annual basis;

The Dudley Cup is the senior grade inter university competition and is named after Lord Dudley, former Viceroy of Ireland who donated the trophy following a visit by King Edward VII to what became UCC in August 1903. The first Dudley Cup final was held in March 1904 with Queen's University Belfast the inaugural winners. The Dudley Cup has been competed for on 75 occasions since and the Roll of Honour is available to view on . The Dudley Cup is played for now among the five senior grade University clubs playing in the Energia AIL, namely University College Dublin, Trinity College Dublin (playing as the Dublin University Football Club), Queen's University Belfast, MU Barnhall RFC and University College Cork. The current holders are University College Cork, who won the cup by defeating Queens University Belfast on 22 March 2025 by 28–29 at the Mardyke in Cork.

The Conroy Cup is the U-20s grade inter-varsity rugby tournament. It was inaugurated in 1988 and it is named in honour of father and son " Judge" Conroy & Paddy Conroy both past Presidents of UCD RFC. The current holders are University College Cork who, led by team captain Dylan Mullan, won their first Conroy Cup trophy in 17 year by defeating Maynooth 5–0 in the 2024–25 final.

The Maughan-Scally Cup is the junior grade inter-varsity rugby tournament. It was inaugurated in 2010 and is named after two stalwarts of UCD RFC and university rugby in Ireland. The Maughan-Scally is considered to be the most social, enjoyable and "old school" of the inter-varsity competitions. The current holders are University of Ulster Coleraine who led by team captain Dave Gilkinson retained the trophy by beating Queen's University in the 2017–2018 final.

The Kay Bowen Trophy is the ladies inter-varsity rugby tournament. It was inaugurated in 2012 and is named after Kay Bowen past President of Dublin University Rugby Club. The competition is played over one day and is hosted in turn by one of the member clubs. This competition is the largest organized by the IURU with over 220 players competing annually. The current holders are Dublin City University who led by team captain Eimear Corri defeated previous holders NUI Galway in the 2017–2018 final.
