= Henry Walter Jack =

Irish agriculturalist (1891-1977)

Henry Walter Jack MBE, OBE
- Born: 14 June 1891; Cork
- Died: 19 December 1977 (aged 86); Dublin
- Occupation: Agriculturalist
- Spouse: Dorothy Purdy
- Children: 2 sons and 1 daughter

Henry Walter Jack MBE, OBE (14 June 1891 – 19 December 1977) was an Irish agriculturalist.

== Early life and education ==
Jack was born in Cork, Ireland in 1891. In 1911, he received his B.A. in economics at National University of Ireland, a B.Sc. in biological sciences in 1912, and studied mycology and plant breeding at Imperial College of Science in 1913.

== Career ==
In 1914, Jack went to Malaya to work in the Agricultural Department of the Federated Malay States. He remained with the department for more than twenty years as Economic Botanist, and was credited with increasing rice production in the country by developing new rice areas, and for the successful breeding of high-yielding rice strains. For his research and published work, he was awarded a Doctorate of Science (D.Sc.) from National University of Ireland in 1926, and in 1930 an MBE.

In 1933, he was appointed Chief Research Officer of the Agricultural Department of the Federated Malay States and Straits Settlements. In the following year, he was appointed Director of Agriculture in Fiji and received the OBE for his agricultural work. During the Second World War, he supplied a million pounds of fresh vegetables each month to the Allied forces on the island for which he received the thanks of the Fijian Government.

In 1945, he was appointed assistant agricultural adviser of the Secretary of State for the Colonies, and in 1947, returned to Malaya as agricultural adviser to Special Commissioner in Southeast Asia, Lord Killearn. He retired in 1950.

== Personal life and death ==
Jack married Dorothy Purdey in 1919, and they had a daughter and two sons. One son was killed whilst serving in the Royal Navy during the Second World War.

He was keen rugby player who was capped twice for Ireland in 1914, after winning the Munster Schools Cup with Christian Brothers School, Cork in 1911 and the Munster Senior Cup with UCC in 1912. In 1921 whilst on leave, and in Malaya captained the Selangor and Federated Malay States teams. He was instrumental in the creation of the Malayan Rugby Union of which he was secretary for seven years. After retiring to Ireland he joined Landsdowne Rugby Club and was Club President in 1960. Jack died on 19 December 1977 in Dublin, aged 86.

== Honours ==
Jack was appointed Member of the Order of the British Empire (MBE) in 1930, and Officer of the Order of the British Empire (OBE) in 1943.
