= Seán Scanlon =

Irish rugby union player

- Born: Seán William Scanlon; 1 September 1988 (age 38) Limerick, Ireland
- Height: 1.80 m (5 ft 11 in)
- Weight: 90 kg (14 st; 200 lb)
- School: Crescent College
- University: University College Cork

Rugby union career
- Position(s): Fullback, Wing
Amateur team(s)
| Years | Team | Apps | (Points) |
- Garryowen
- Cork Constitution
Senior career
| Years | Team | Apps | (Points) |
| 2011–2013 | Munster | 1 | (5) |
| 2013–2016 | Rotherham | 69 | (75) |
| 2016–2017 | Doncaster | 14 | (10) |
| 2017–2020 | Nottingham | 63 | (97) |
- Correct as of 14 February 2020
International career
| Years | Team | Apps | (Points) |
| 2008 | Ireland U20 | 7 | ((0)) |
- Correct as of 30 June 2008

Seán William Scanlon (born 1 September 1988) is a retired Irish rugby union player. He played as a fullback or wing. During his professional career, Scanlon played for his home province Munster, before moving to England and playing for Rotherham, Doncaster and Nottingham.

== Early life ==
Born in Limerick, Scanlon attended Crescent College and first began playing rugby there, whilst also playing for Garryowen's underage teams. From a family with a GAA background, Scanlon also played football for Limerick at minor level. After completing his leaving cert, Scanlon attended University College Cork and played for Cork Constitution in the amateur All-Ireland League, where impressive performances earned him a place in Munster's academy and a call up to the Ireland under-20s squad.

== Munster ==
Scanlon secured a development contract with Munster for the 2011–12 season, and made his debut for Munster against Connacht in a Pro12 match on 26 December 2011, scoring his first try for Munster during the game. He signed a one-year contract extension with Munster in March 2012, and started at fullback for Munster A in their 31–12 British and Irish Cup Final victory against Cross Keys on 27 April 2012. A herniated disc ruled Scanlon out for seven months, and at the time the Munster back-three consisted of Felix Jones, Doug Howlett, Keith Earls, Simon Zebo, Johne Murphy and Denis Hurley; injury and the lack of opportunities under new head coach Rob Penney led Scanlon to conclude that he would have to leave his home province to find regular gametime.

== Rotherham ==
Scanlon left Ireland and joined English RFU Championship side Rotherham at the ahead of the 2013–14 season. Rotherham were contenders for promotion under head coach Lee Blackett, but after defeat to Bristol in the play-off semi-finals during the 2014–15 season, the club experienced a downturn.

== Doncaster ==
With Rotherham struggling, Scanlon was approached by another RFU Championship side, Doncaster Knights, and he joined them for the 2016–17 RFU Championship season.

== Nottingham ==
After one season with Doncaster, Scanlon joined a third RFU Championship, Nottingham, where former Munster man Ian Costello was coach. In early 2020, Scanlon had agreed a new two-year contract with the club as a player-coach, however, the impact of the COVID-19 pandemic was soon felt when the RFU drastically cut funding for the championship, leaving Scanlon, like many players, in a difficult position. He had offers to keep playing from clubs in France, but Scanlon instead chose to retire from the professional game. In his final season with the club, Scanlon won the Supporters Player of the Season and Try of the Season awards.

== Post-retirement ==
Scanlon quickly started a new job with a company called LandTech, and he is still involved with rugby in his capacity as head coach of Dronfield, who compete in the amateur Midlands Rugby League Division Two; Scanlon has not ruled out returning to playing rugby with the club once the amateur game resumes.
