= Tyler Bleyendaal =

NZ rugby union player (born 1990)

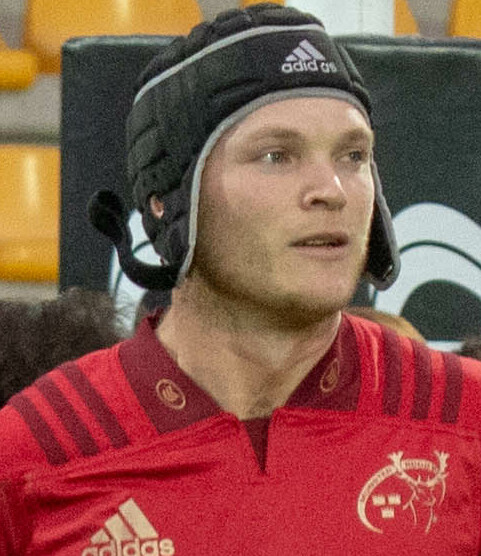
- Bleyendaal playing for Munster in 2018
- Born: 31 May 1990 (age 35) Christchurch, New Zealand
- Height: 1.85 m (6 ft 1 in)
- Weight: 95 kg (15.0 st; 209 lb)
- School: Christchurch Boys' High School

Rugby union career
- Position(s): First five-eighth, Centre
Senior career
| Years | Team | Apps | (Points) |
| 2011–2014 | Canterbury | 33 | (235) |
| 2012–2014 | Crusaders | 21 | (111) |
| 2015–2020 | Munster | 62 | (375) |
- Correct as of 22 May 2020
International career
| Years | Team | Apps | (Points) |
| 2010 | New Zealand U20 | 5 | (82) |
- Correct as of 22 May 2020
Coaching career
- Years: Team
- 2020–2024: Hurricanes (assistant)
- 2024-Present: Leinster (assistant)
- Correct as of 20 Sep 2024

Tyler Bleyendaal (born 31 May 1990) is a New Zealand former rugby union player and current coach. Primarily a fly-half who could also play at centre, Bleyendaal played for Canterbury, Crusaders and Munster during his playing career, before he was forced to retire from rugby in May 2020 after a persistent neck injury. He returned to New Zealand and joined the Hurricanes coaching team in December 2020.

== Rugby career ==
=== Crusaders ===
Bleyendaal made his debut for the Crusaders in 2012 against the Blues at Eden Park in round 1. He was a key player in the game, scoring 14 points to help the Crusaders to a 19–18 win.

=== Munster ===
On 11 May 2014, it was announced that Bleyendaal will join Irish province Munster on a three-year contract starting from 1 November 2014. Due to a neck injury, Bleyendaal didn't arrive in Munster until January 2015.

Bleyendaal made his return from the injury on 29 April 2015, starting for Munster A in their friendly against Ulster Ravens and completing 60 minutes. He made his full debut for Munster on 5 September 2015, coming off the bench against Benetton. In January 2016, Bleyendaal was ruled out for 12 weeks with a quadriceps tendon injury.

On 22 October 2016, Bleyendaal scored 16 points, including a try, and won the Man-of-the-Match award in Munster's 38–17 win against Glasgow Warriors in Round 2 of the 2016–17 European Rugby Champions Cup, a match that was his European debut for the province. On 10 December 2016, Bleyendaal scored 18 points off the tee in Munster's 38–0 win against Leicester Tigers. On 24 January 2017, it was announced that Bleyendaal had signed a contract extension.

On 3 February 2017, Bleyendaal captained Munster for the first time, leading the side in the 2016–17 Pro12 fixture against Edinburgh. On 1 April 2017, Bleyendaal scored 21 points off the kicking tee in Munster's 41–16 Champions Cup quarter-final win against Toulouse. On 4 May 2017, it was announced that Bleyendaal had won the 2016–17 Munster Rugby Senior Player of the Year award, having been nominated by his teammates alongside John Ryan and Niall Scannell. He was also named in the 2016–17 Pro12 Dream Team.

On 17 February 2018, Bleyendaal made his return from a neck injury that had prevented him from playing since Munster's Champions Cup game against Castres in October 2017, doing so when he came off the bench to replace Ian Keatley against Cardiff Blues in the 2017–18 Pro14 and kicking a late penalty to earn his side a losing bonus-point. However, ongoing symptoms of his neck injury required surgery, ruling Bleyendaal out for the remainder of the 2017–18 season.

Bleyendaal made his return to training for Munster in September 2018 and made his return to playing off the bench for Munster A on 12 October 2018, playing 30 minutes. Bleyendaal made his first senior Munster appearance since February 2018 in the provinces 2018–19 Pro14 fixture against Cheetahs, with Bleyendaal starting at inside centre and captaining the side to a 30–26 away victory. He signed a contract extension with Munster in February 2019, a deal that will see Bleyendaal remain with the province until at least June 2021. Bleyendaal earned his 50th cap for Munster in their 31–12 win against Zebre on 23 March 2019.

Bleyendaal was forced to retire from rugby with immediate effect in May 2020 due to a persistent neck injury, which was sustained while he was playing in New Zealand and recurred on multiple occasions during his time with Munster.

== International career ==
Bleyendaal captained New Zealand Under-20 to victory in the 2010 IRB Junior World Championship. He qualified for Ireland in January 2018 under World Rugby's residence rules, and as such, Bleyendaal was called up as a non-playing guest to the Ireland international camp in August 2017.

== Coaching career ==
Following his retirement due to injury, Bleyendaal returned to New Zealand and joined the Hurricanes coaching setup, where former Munster player Jason Holland is head coach, in December 2020.

In April 2024, it was announced that Bleyendaal would be joining the coaching team at Leinster.

== Honours ==
New Zealand

- World Rugby Under 20 Championship
  - Winner (1): 2010

Individual

- Munster Rugby Player of the Year
  - Winner (1): 2017
