= Ross Noonan =

Irish rugby union player

- Born: 14 February 1985 (age 41) Douglas, Cork, Ireland
- Height: 1.90 m (6 ft 3 in)
- Weight: 108 kg (17.0 st; 238 lb)
- School: Christian Brothers College
- University: University College Cork

Rugby union career
- Position(s): Flanker, Number 8, Lock
Amateur team(s)
Years	Team	Apps	(Points)
- Dolphin
–	UCC		
–	Cork Constitution		
Senior career
Years	Team	Apps	(Points)
2006–2007	Munster	2	(0)
2007–2010	Bedford Blues		
2010–2011	Pertemps Bees	9	(0)
2011–2012	Rotherham	1	(0)
2011	→ Hull Ionians (loan)		
- Correct as of 22 October 2011
International career
Years	Team	Apps	(Points)
2003	Ireland Schools		
2004	Ireland U19		
2005–2006	Ireland U21		

Ross Noonan (born 14 February 1985) is an Irish former rugby union player.

== Early life ==
Born in Douglas, Cork, Noonan first began playing rugby for Cork club Dolphin's underage teams. He attended Christian Brothers College and played Munster Schools Rugby Senior Cup for the school, captaining them to Bowen Shield victories in 2001 and 2003. He was part the UCC under-20s team that won the All-Ireland Under-20 League during the 2004–05 season and played for the sides senior team during the 2005–06 season, before joining Cork Constitution ahead of the 2006–07 season.

== Professional career ==
=== Munster ===
Noonan represented Munster at under-21 level in 2004 and 2005, and joined the newly created Munster academy in 2004. He was awarded the John McCarthy Award for Munster Academy Player of the Year for the 2005–06 season, and made his competitive senior debut for the province on 1 September 2006, when he started in their 22–13 defeat against Welsh side Cardiff Blues whilst still in the academy.

=== Bedford Blues ===
Having found first team opportunities limited at Munster, Noonan left the province ahead of the 2007–08 season and moved to England to join Bedford Blues, who were coached by Mike Rayer and played in National Division 1.

=== Pertemps Bees ===
Noonan joined Birmingham & Solihull, better known as Pertemps Bees, from Bedford Blues, though his time with the club was hampered by injury.

=== Rotherham ===
After being released by Pertemps Bees, Noonan joined Rotherham on a trial, but struggled to break into the first XV. He spent some time on loan to Hull Ionians, and Stourbridge expressed interest in signing Noonan to help in their relegation battle.

== Ireland ==
Noonan was part of the Ireland Schools team that won a grand slam in 2003, and he went on to represent Ireland under-19s at the 2004 U19 World Championship, and Ireland under-21s at the 2005 and 2006 U21 World Championships.

== Life after rugby ==
After ending his rugby career in 2012, Noonan joined Capgemini, before joining Berkeley Group Holdings.
