= Gerry Hurley =

Irish rugby union player

- Born: 16 May 1984 (age 42) Midleton, County Cork, Ireland
- Height: 1.75 m (5 ft 9 in)
- Weight: 76 kg (12.0 st; 168 lb)
- School: Rockwell College

Rugby union career
- Position: Scrum-half
Amateur team(s)
Years	Team	Apps	(Points)
- Garryowen
–	Cork Constitution		
Senior career
Years	Team	Apps	(Points)
2007–2014	Munster	8	(0)
- Correct as of 20 Apr 2014
International career
Years	Team	Apps	(Points)
2013	Ireland Club XV	2	(0)
- Correct as of 23 November 2013

Gerry Hurley (born 16 May 1984) is an Irish rugby union player. He plays as a scrum-half. Hurley won a Munster Schools Rugby Senior Cup title with Rockwell College. He plays his club rugby with Cork Constitution.

== Garryowen ==
Hurley won the All-Ireland League and Cup with Garryowen.

== Cork Constitution ==
Hurley captained his club side Cork Constitution to the All-Ireland Cup on 27 April 2013.

== Munster ==
Whilst still in the Munster academy, Hurley made his first senior start for Munster in a pre-season friendly against the USA on 26 August 2007. Hurley made his Celtic League debut as a substitute in Munster's 26–26 win against Scarlets on 22 September 2007. His Heineken Cup debut came against Clermont Auvergne on 18 November 2007, with Hurley coming on as a substitute in the 36–13 win in Thomond Park. Hurley graduated from the Munster Academy at the end of the 2007–08 season, but did not receive a contract.

Hurley started for Munster in an uncapped friendly against La Rochelle on 12 August 2011. Despite not earning a contract when he graduated from the Munster Academy in 2008, Hurley signed a one-year training contract with Munster in July 2013. He came off the bench during Munster's Pro12 game against Connacht on 27 December 2013, his first appearance for Munster in 6 years. He was added to Munster's 2013-14 Heineken Cup squad on 20 March 2014.

== Ireland ==
Hurley captained the Ireland Club XV side against England Counties XV to a 30–20 victory on 8 February 2013. He also captained the side during their 30–18 defeat to Scotland Clubs on 8 March 2013.
