= Barry O'Donnell =

Irish doctor (1926–2019)

Barry O'Donnell (6 September 1926 – 26 November 2019) was an Irish pediatric surgeon who worked at Our Lady's Hospital for Sick Children, Crumlin in Dublin, who along with Prem Puri pioneered the sub-ureteric Teflon injection (STING) procedure for vesico-ureteric reflux. He was awarded the Urology Medal by the American Academy of Pediatrics, the first pediatric surgeon working outside the US to be so honored.

O'Donnell, a native of Cork, was educated at University College Cork graduating in 1949, training at Great Ormond Street Hospital in London and in Boston, USA. He has held posts at the Temple Street Children's University Hospital and National Children's Hospital, Harcourt Street (closed). He is also past president of the Royal College of Surgeons in Ireland, former president of British Association of Pediatric Surgeons and former chairman of the British Medical Journal.

== Personal ==
b. 1926 Cork, eldest son of Michael O’Donnell and Kitty O’Donnell (née Barry)

Died: 26 November 2019

Education: Christian Brothers College, Cork; Castleknock College, Dublin; University College Cork

MB (hons) UCC, 1949; MCh, NUI, 1954, FRCSI, 1953; FRCS Eng 1953; FRCS Ed (ad hom) 1993; FRCP & S (Glas qua chir), 1999; FRCS Eng (Hon) 2007.

Married 1959: Mary Leydon b.1933 – d.2015; (BA, BComm, BL) only child of John Leydon (KC St Gregory, DLitt, (the most senior civil servant of his day, described by Sean Lemass (Taoiseach 1959–66) as ‘the ablest man I ever knew’) and Nan Leydon (née Layden).

3 sons, John, Michael and Nicholas and 1 daughter, Catherine

- Postgraduate posts in Winchester, Brighton, Leicester; Hospital for Sick Children, Great Ormond Street, London.
- Registrar, Royal Northern Hospital, London; Whittington Hospital, London.
- Senior Registrar, Hospital for Sick Children, Great Ormond Street (Sir Denis Browne, Sir David I. Williams)
- Ainsworth Travelling Scholarship from UCC to Lahey Clinic, Boston (Drs Richard B. Cattell, Herbert Adams, Samuel Marshall, Ken Warren) and Boston Floating Hospital for Infants and Children (Dr Ovar Swenson).
- Consultant Surgeon, Our Lady's Hospital for Sick Children, 1957–93; Children's Hospital Temple Street, 1977–88; National Children's Hospital, Harcourt Street, 1965–80.
- Professor of Paediatric Surgery, RCSI, 1986–93.
- Honorary Fellow, Singapore Academy of Medicine and Surgery, 1999; Malaysian Academy of Medicine and Surgery, 2000; College of Surgeons, South Africa, 2001; section of surgery.
- American Academy of Pediatrics; American Pediatric Surgical Association; American Surgical Association; New England Surgical Association; Boston Surgical Association.
- President, British, Canadian and Irish Medical Associations, 1976–77; British Association of Paediatric Surgeons, 1981–82; surgical section RAMI, 1990–92.
- Chairman, Journal Committee, BMA, (including BMJ), 1982–88.

== Awards and honours ==
- National People of the Year award jointly with Prof. Prem Puri. 1984
- Hunterian Professorship, RCS Eng. 1986
- Denis Browne gold medal, British Association of Paediatric Surgeons, 1989; urology medal, American Academy of Paediatrics, 2003; Distinguished Alumni Award, UCC, 2004.
- Eponymous addresses in Australia, US and UK.
- Visiting professor to six US universities, including twice to Harvard.
- Director, Standard Chartered Bank (Ireland), 1977–88; West Deutsche LandesBank (Ireland), 1988 -96.
- Sixty -four peer-reviewed publications. Four books, (two co-authored) including Terence Millin: a Remarkable Irish Surgeon)
