= James O'Flynn =

Irish hurler (born 1995)

Personal information
- Native name: Séamus Ó Floinn (Irish)
- Born: 1995 (age 30–31) Glounthaune, County Cork, Ireland

Sport
- Sport: Hurling
- Position: Centre-back
Club
- Years: Club
- Erin's Own
Club titles
- Cork titles: 0
College
- Years: College
- University College Cork
College titles
- Fitzgibbon titles: 0
Inter-county*
Years	County	Apps (scores)
2021-	Cork	0 (0-00)
Inter-county titles
- Munster titles: 0
- All-Irelands: 0
- NHL: 0
- All Stars: 0
- *Inter County team apps and scores correct as of 21:52, 7 May 2021.

James O'Flynn (born 1995) is an Irish hurler who plays as a centre-back for club side Erin's Own and at inter-county level with the Cork senior hurling team. His brother, Robbie O'Flynn, also plays for both teams.

== Career statistics ==
=== Inter-county ===
As of match played 9 May 2021.

Team	Year	National League			Munster		All-Ireland		Total	
Team	Year	Division	Apps	Score	Apps	Score	Apps	Score	Apps	Score
Cork	2021	Division 1A	0	0-00	0	0-00	0	0-00	0	0-00
Total			0	0-00	0	0-00	0	0-00	0	0-00
