= James Coughlan =

Irish rugby union coach

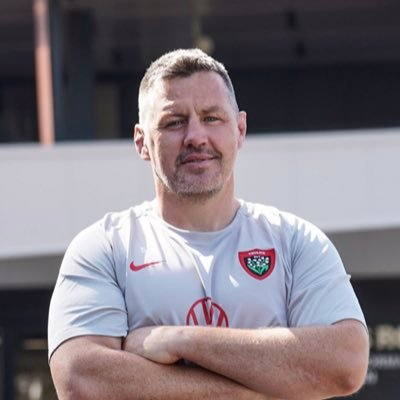
- Coughlan as defence coach for RC Toulonnais in 2021
- Born: 9 December 1980 (age 45) Cork, Ireland
- Height: 1.91 m (6 ft 3 in)
- Weight: 109 kg (17.2 st; 240 lb)
- School: Christian Brothers College
- University: University College Cork

Rugby union career
- Position: Back-row
Amateur team(s)
Years	Team	Apps	(Points)
2001–2011	Dolphin		
Senior career
Years	Team	Apps	(Points)
2006–2014	Munster	139	(65)
2014–2017	Pau	69	(40)
- Correct as of 19 May 2017
International career
Years	Team	Apps	(Points)
2008–2009	Ireland 7s		
2013	Ireland Wolfhounds	1	(0)
- Correct as of 26 January 2013
Coaching career
- Years: Team
- 2017–2019: Pau (Academy coach)
- 2019–2020: Aix (Forwards coach)
- 2020–2021: Brive (Defence coach)
- 2021–: Toulon (Defence coach)
- 2021: → Toulon (temporary head coach)

James Coughlan (born 9 December 1980) is a retired Irish rugby union player and current coach. Coughlan played primarily as a number 8 and represented Cork-based amateur club Dolphin in the All-Ireland League, his native province Munster and French club Pau, and, internationally, Ireland Wolfhounds and the Ireland 7s team during his career.

== Early rugby career ==
Coughlan started playing rugby with Old Christians at the age of 10. He continued playing when he went to Christian Brothers College and was selected for the Irish Schoolboys team. After school, Coughlan went to University College Cork and played for the Irish Universities team. He joined Dolphin in 2001 and played 85 times for them in the All-Ireland League & Cup, scoring 32 tries, a club record. In 2008, Coughlan also played on the Irish Sevens team that qualified for the 2009 Rugby Sevens World Cup, which was held in Dubai.

== Professional career ==
=== Munster ===
Coughlan made his Munster debut against Cardiff Blues in the Celtic League in September 2006, and his performances in his first season earned him a full contract. He made one appearance for Munster during their victorious 2007–08 Heineken Cup campaign. Coughlan was one of the stars for Munster in their 18–16 defeat by New Zealand at the opening of Thomond Park in November 2008. Denis Leamy's injuries propelled Coughlan into the Munster starting XV in the 2009–10 season, and he become a mainstay in the team, captaining Munster during their historic 15–6 win over Australia in November 2010, and winning the Munster Player of the Year award for 2011, beating fellow nominees Keith Earls, Ronan O'Gara and Doug Howlett. He started at number 8 for Munster as they beat old rivals Leinster 19–9 to win the 2011 Magners League Grand Final. Coughlan was ruled out of the remainder of the 2011–12 season after a fractured bone in his hand, sustained in Munster's Heineken Cup quarter-final defeat against Ulster on 8 April 2012, required surgery.

Coughlan agreed a contract extension with Munster in January 2013. Coughlan scored a try and won the player of the match award in Munster's 38–6 win against Edinburgh in round 6 of the 2013–14 Heineken Cup on 19 January 2014, a win that secured a home quarter-final for Munster. Coughlan was nominated for the Munster Rugby Senior Player of the Year 2014 award, and won the IRUPA Unsung Hero award during the annual awards in May 2014. Coughlan left Munster in June 2014, after being granted an early release from his contract to move abroad.

=== Pau ===
Coughlan joined French Pro D2 side Pau on a two-year contract at the beginning of the 2014–15 season. Coughlan announced that he was retiring from rugby union upon the conclusion of the 2016–17 season, bringing to an end his 11-year professional career in which he won 139 caps for Munster, 69 for Pau and 1 for Ireland Wolfhounds.

== Ireland ==
Coughlan was called into the senior Ireland squad for the 2012 Six Nations Championship to replace the injured Leo Cullen, but did not feature in the tournament. He was also called up to the Ireland squad for the uncapped warm-up against the Barbarians on 29 May 2012 in Gloucester, coming on in the 60th minute for Chris Henry in the 29–28 defeat.

He was called into Ireland's training squad for the 2013 Six Nations Championship on 21 January 2013, and captained Ireland Wolfhounds in their 14–10 friendly defeat against England Saxons on 25 January 2013. He was added to Ireland's squad for their game against Scotland on 17 February 2013, and was named in the Ireland squad for the 2013 Autumn tests, but Coughlan never won a senior cap for Ireland, much to the frustration of some.

== Coaching career ==
Upon retirement, Coughlan immediately progressed into coaching with Pau's academy. During this time, 27 of the 30 players in the academy went on to sign professional contracts. After two years with Pau, Coughlan joined Aix as a forwards coach for the 2019–20 season and oversaw a transformation of the team's defence from the fifth-worst to the fifth-best, as well as turning the team's scrum from the fourth worst to the second-best in the Pro D2. Coughlan's work caught the attention of Top 14 club Brive, and he joined the club in July 2020 ahead of the 2020–21 season. Ahead of the 2021–22 season, Coughlan, having left Brive, joined another French Top 14 club, Toulon, as their defence coach, and was placed in temporary charge of the team after head coach Patrice Collazo left in October 2021.
