= Collie O'Shea =

- Born: 19 January 1991 (age 35) Dublin, Ireland
- Height: 1.80 m (5 ft 11 in)
- Weight: 92 kg (14.5 st; 203 lb)
- School: Belvedere College

Rugby union career
- Position: Centre
Amateur team(s)
Years	Team	Apps	(Points)
- Clontarf
Senior career
Years	Team	Apps	(Points)
2012–2015	Leinster	6	(0)
2016	Munster	1	(0)
- Correct as of 18 September 2016
International career
Years	Team	Apps	(Points)
2011	Ireland U20	2	(0)
- Correct as of 7 May 2014

Collie O'Shea (born 19 January 1991) is an Irish rugby union player. His plays as a centre and played club rugby for Clontarf.

== Leinster ==
On 9 February 2012, O'Shea made his competitive debut for Leinster, starting against Benetton Treviso in a 2011–12 Pro12 fixture.

== Munster ==
In August 2016, O'Shea joined Munster on a three-month contract.
