= Felix Jones (rugby union) =

Irish rugby union coach (born 1987)

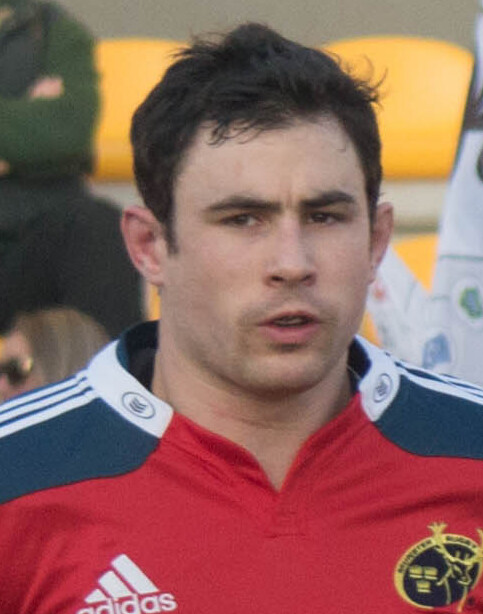
- Jones in 2015
- Born: 5 August 1987 (age 39) Dublin, Ireland
- Height: 1.85 m (6 ft 1 in)
- Weight: 90 kg (14 st; 200 lb)
- School: St. Andrew's College
- University: University College Dublin

Rugby union career
- Position(s): Fullback, Wing
- Current team: South Africa (Assistant Coach)
Amateur team(s)
Years	Team	Apps	(Points)
- Seapoint
2008-2009	Old Belvedere		
–	Shannon		
Senior career
Years	Team	Apps	(Points)
2008–2009	Leinster	1	(0)
2009–2015	Munster	90	(50)
- Correct as of 3 October 2015
International career
Years	Team	Apps	(Points)
2007	Ireland U20	5	(15)
2009–2015	Ireland Wolfhounds	5	(10)
2011–2015	Ireland	13	(15)
Coaching career
- Years: Team
- 2016–2017: Munster (Technical coach)
- 2017–2019: Munster (Backs coach)
- 2019–2023: South Africa (Coaching consultant)
- 2023–2024: England (Assistant Coach)
- 2025–: South Africa (Assistant Coach)

Felix Jones (born 5 August 1987) is an Irish rugby union coach and former player. He played primarily as a fullback, but could also play on the wing. In October 2015, Jones was forced to retire from rugby due to a neck injury. He is an assistant coach for South Africa, currently his second stint involved with the team.

== Early life and education ==
He is the great-grandson of the architect Alfred Edwin Jones. His father is a conservation architect.

Jones played mini-rugby for Seapoint and continued to play for the club until his professional career. He was a member of Seapoint's All-Ireland Junior Cup-winning team in 2007. He attended St. Andrew's College in Dublin, where he played for the school's Junior and Senior Cup teams.

Jones holds a master's degree in Sport, Exercise and Performance Psychology from the University of Limerick.

== Rugby playing career ==
=== Leinster ===
Jones played for Leinster's under-19 team (2 caps), under-20 team (4 caps) and A team (13 caps) before making his Leinster first XV debut against Connacht in February 2008.

=== Munster ===
Jones made his Munster debut against Glasgow Warriors in September 2009 and played 6 games before injuring his neck against Connacht in December 2009. Jones made his comeback against Aironi in September 2010, and played 3 games before injuring his knee against Ospreys in the same month. He was out until March 2011. He made his European debut for Munster against Brive in April 2011. Jones was part of the Munster team that won the 2010–11 Magners League.

Jones made his comeback from the injury that ruled him out of the 2011 Rugby World Cup on 10 February 2012, playing 80 minutes for Shannon in their AIL game against Young Munster. He made his comeback for Munster in a Pro12 fixture against Treviso on 18 February 2012. Jones made his Heineken Cup debut in the quarter-final against Ulster on 8 April 2012. He missed Munster's league play-off semi-final against Ospreys on 11 May 2012 when he picked up a shoulder injury in training. The shoulder injury ruled him out for at least 4 months, as it required surgery.

Jones returned from the injury on 13 October 2012, playing a full 80 minutes for Munster A. He then came off the bench in Munster's second round Heineken Cup tie against Edinburgh on 21 October 2012. Jones underwent successful knee surgery in late January 2013, and is expected to be back in action for Munster by March 2013. He signed a two-year contract extension with Munster in February 2013. Jones captained Munster in their 21–10 win against Treviso on 12 September 2014.

=== Ireland ===
An injury to Luke Fitzgerald gave Jones a call-up to the Ireland under-20 team which went on to achieve a Grand Slam in the 2007 Six Nations Under 20s Championship, with Jones scoring two tries in the opening fixture against Wales. In total, Jones earned 5 caps for the Ireland Under-20 team.

Jones represented Ireland A three times and was a member of the squad which won the Churchill Cup in 2009.

Jones was selected in Ireland's squad for the 2011 Rugby World Cup warm-ups in August. He earned his first cap as a substitute in the game against Scotland on 6 August 2011. His second cap came against France on 13 August 2011, again as a substitute. His first start for Ireland came against France on 20 August. However, an ankle ligament injury sustained in an awkward fall against France dashed Jones's hopes of playing at the 2011 Rugby World Cup in New Zealand, as the injury ruled him out for the duration of the tournament.

Jones was named in the Ireland squad for the 2013 Ireland tour to North America on 19 May 2013. He came off the bench against the USA on 8 June 2013. Jones started in Ireland's 40–14 victory against Canada on 15 June 2013.

Jones was called up as injury-cover to Ireland's squad for the 2013 Guinness Series on 19 November 2013.

Jones started for Ireland Wolfhounds in their friendly against England Saxons on 25 January 2014. On 27 January 2014, Jones was named in Ireland's 34-man squad for the opening two fixtures of the 2014 Six Nations Championship.

Jones was named in the Ireland squad for their 2014 Tour to Argentina on 19 May 2014. He started the first test against Argentina on 7 June 2014.

Jones was named in the Ireland squad for the 2014 Guinness Series on 21 October 2014. Jones came off the bench during the 29–15 win against South Africa on 8 November 2014. He started against Georgia on 16 November 2014, scoring two tries in the 49–7 win. Jones came on in the 26–23 win against Australia on 22 November 2014.

Jones captained Ireland Wolfhounds in their game against England Saxons on 30 January 2015. He was named in the Ireland squad for the opening rounds of the 2015 Six Nations Championship on 1 February 2015. He came off the bench against Italy on 7 February 2015. Jones came off the bench in the 19–9 win against England on 1 March 2015. England's failure to score enough points against France meant Ireland won the 2015 Six Nations Championship, the first time Ireland have won back-to-back championships since 1948–49. Jones was nominated for the IRUPA Medal For Excellence 2015 in April 2015.

Jones was named in the 45-man training squad for the 2015 Rugby World Cup on 24 June 2015. He started in the first World Cup warm-up against Wales on 8 August 2015, scoring a try in the 35–21 win for Ireland. Jones came off the bench in the warm-up game against Wales on 29 August 2015.

=== Retirement ===
Jones retired in 2015 after a neck injury.

== Rugby coaching career ==
=== Munster ===
Jones was recommended for a coaching position at Munster by Ireland coach Joe Schmidt. He joined the Munster coaching team ahead of the 2016–17 season as a technical coach. After helping Munster reach the semi-finals of the 2016–17 European Rugby Champions Cup and the 2017 Pro12 Grand Final, he signed a two-year contract extension with the province which saw his role expand to backs and attack coach. He left Munster's coaching staff in June 2019.

=== Ireland ===
While with Munster, Jones also assisted Ireland head coach Joe Schmidt with the national teams tour of Japan in June 2017.

=== South Africa ===
Ahead of the 2019 Rugby World Cup, Jones joined the South African national team as a defence consultant.

South Africa's head coach at the time was Rassie Erasmus, who previously was director of rugby at Munster when Jones began his coaching career with the province. Erasmus recruited Jones in part for his analysis of northern hemisphere opposition defences. Erasmus had proposed that Jones — then only 30 — be his replacement as Munsters director of rugby.

South Africa went on to win the 2019 Rugby World Cup defeating England in the final 32–12. Jones continued with South Africa, winning a second world cup in 2023.

Jones has said that one area of his coaching that developed whilst working with South Africa was winning collisions.

=== England ===
In 2023 Jones joined the England national team as an assistant coach under head coach Steve Borthwick. He resigned from England in August 2024, citing being unhappy with the "turmoil" on the team.

=== Return to South Africa ===
In February 2025, after becoming disillusioned in the England setup under head coach Steve Borthwick he returned to the South African coaching team setup as an assistant coach, once again working for Rassie Erasmus.

=== Coaching style ===
Jones has been credited with high work rate, detailed analysis, and empathy with players.

Jones has cited Rob Penney as an important influence, and credited Anthony Foley, Jerry Flannery, Rassie Erasmus, Jacques Nienaber and Joe Schmidt with helping his coaching develop.

== Personal life ==
Jones and his partner Lyanne have 2 sons.

== Honours ==
=== Munster ===
- United Rugby Championship:
  - Winner (1): 2010–11

=== Ireland A ===
- Churchill Cup:
  - Winner (1): 2009

=== Ireland ===
- Six Nations Championship:
  - Winner (1): 2015

=== South Africa ===
- Rugby World Cup:
  - Winner (2): 2019, 2023
- The Rugby Championship:
  - Winner (1): 2019, 2025
- British and Irish Lions Tour:
  - Winner (1): 2021
