= Ivan Dineen =

- Born: 5 July 1987 (age 39) Cork, Ireland
- Height: 1.85 m (6 ft 1 in)
- Weight: 99 kg (15.6 st; 218 lb)
- School: Christian Brothers College

Rugby union career
- Position(s): Centre, Wing
Amateur team(s)
Years	Team	Apps	(Points)
- UCC
–	Cork Constitution		
Senior career
Years	Team	Apps	(Points)
2010–2015	Munster	34	(15)
- Correct as of 1 March 2015

Ivan Dineen (born 5 July 1987) is a former Irish rugby union player. He played as a centre or wing.

== Munster ==
Dineen made his debut against Treviso in October 2010. He scored his first try for Munster against Ulster, also in October 2010. He started for Munster A in their 31-12 2011–12 British and Irish Cup Final victory against Cross Keys, scoring Munster's second try. Dineen was added to Munster's 2012–13 Heineken Cup squad in March 2013. He signed a two-year contract extension with Munster in early April 2013.

Dineen made his European debut on 25 January 2015, coming off the bench against Sale Sharks to replace the injured Denis Hurley in Round 6 of the 2014-15 European Rugby Champions Cup. In June 2015, it was announced that Dineen would be leaving Munster.
