= Dave O'Callaghan =

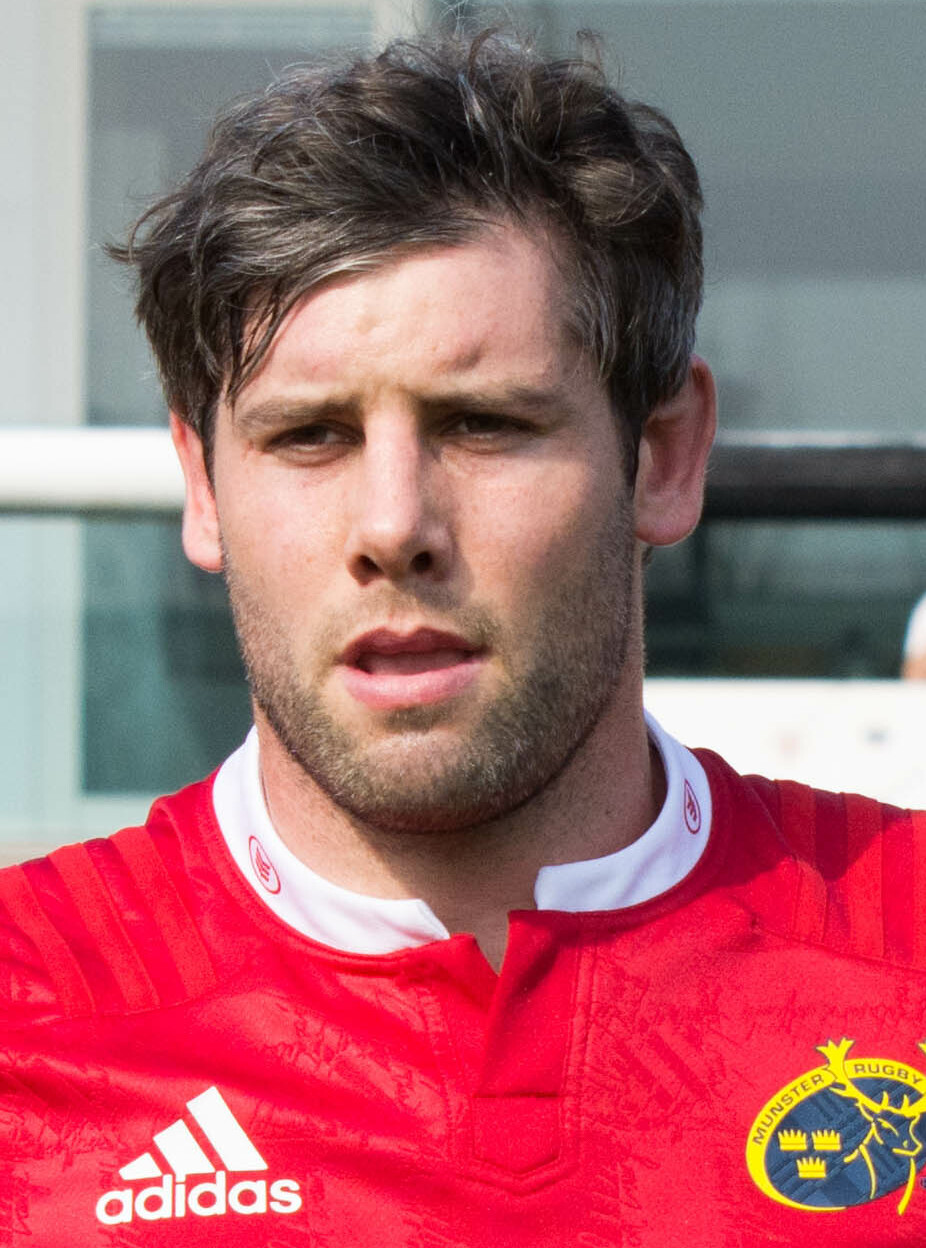
- O'Callaghan in 2017
- Born: David O'Callaghan; 12 January 1990 (age 36) Youghal, County Cork, Ireland
- Height: 1.95 m (6 ft 5 in)
- Weight: 112 kg (17.6 st; 247 lb)
- School: Midleton College
- University: University College Cork

Rugby union career
- Position(s): Flanker, Lock
Amateur team(s)
Years	Team	Apps	(Points)
- Dolphin
Senior career
Years	Team	Apps	(Points)
2011–2019	Munster	85	(25)
2019–2024	Biarritz	52	(10)
- Correct as of 5 March 2022
International career
Years	Team	Apps	(Points)
2009–2010	Ireland U20	15	(0)
2013	Emerging Ireland	2	(0)
- Correct as of 16 June 2013

Dave O'Callaghan (born 12 January 1990) is a former Irish rugby union player and current coach of Waterpark RFC who last played for French Rugby Pro D2 side Biarritz. He played as a flanker, usually blindside, but can also play as a lock. O'Callaghan has a Commerce degree from University College Cork.

== Professional career ==
=== Munster ===
O'Callaghan moved up through the Munster Academy after joining in November 2009. As an academy member, he frequently appeared in friendlies and the British and Irish Cup for Munster A. He was a member of the Munster A team that finished runners-up in 2009–10 British and Irish Cup.

On 8 October 2011, O'Callaghan made his full Munster debut against Ospreys in a Pro12 match. O'Callaghan was named in Munster's squad for the 2011–12 Heineken Cup in October 2011. He made his Heineken Cup debut against Northampton Saints on 21 January 2012, in Round 6 of the pool stage.

O'Callaghan signed a Development contract with Munster in March 2012. On 27 April 2012, O'Callaghan started for the Munster A team that beat Cross Keys 31–12 to win the final of the 2011–12 British and Irish Cup. He won the John McCarthy Award for Munster Academy Player of the Year for the 2011–12 season.

In January 2013, O'Callaghan agreed a two-year contract extension with Munster. In January 2015, O'Callaghan signed a one-year contract to remain with Munster until at least June 2016. O'Callaghan started in Munster's opening game of the 2015–16 European Rugby Champions Cup on 14 November 2015. In December 2015, O'Callaghan signed a two-year contract extension with Munster. On 24 September 2016, O'Callaghan scored the bonus-point try in Munster's 28–14 win against Edinburgh. He made his return from a knee injury on 19 January 2018, coming off the bench for Munster A in their 27–0 British and Irish Cup win against Ospreys Premiership Select. O'Callaghan signed a one-year contract extension with Munster in March 2018.

=== Biarritz ===
O'Callaghan left Munster to join French Rugby Pro D2 side Biarritz ahead of the 2019–20 season.

== Ireland ==
O'Callaghan joined the Emerging Ireland squad for the 2013 IRB Tbilisi Cup in June 2013. He came off the bench in the sides 19–8 defeat at the hands of South Africa President's XV on 11 June 2013. O'Callaghan started against Uruguay in Emerging Ireland's final game 42–33 win.
