= Damien Varley =

Irish rugby union player (born 1983)

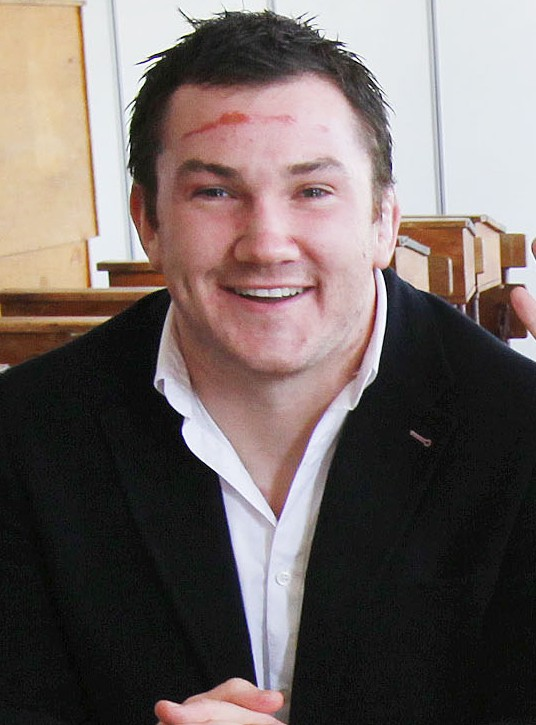
- Varley at his old school, St Munchin's College
- Born: 29 October 1983 (age 43) Limerick, Ireland
- Height: 1.78 m (5 ft 10 in)
- Weight: 110 kg (17 st; 240 lb)
- School: St Munchin's College
- University: University of Limerick

Rugby union career
- Position: Hooker
Amateur team(s)
Years	Team	Apps	(Points)
- Garryowen
Senior career
Years	Team	Apps	(Points)
2006–2008	Munster	2	(0)
2008–2009	Wasps	4	(10)
2009–2015	Munster	121	(60)
- Correct as of 5 October 2014
International career
Years	Team	Apps	(Points)
2010–2014	Ireland	3	(0)
2011–2013	Ireland Wolfhounds	4	(0)
- Correct as of 9 February 2015

Damien Varley (born 29 October 1983) is a former Irish rugby union player who represented Munster and Ireland. He played as a hooker. Varley was forced to retire from rugby in February 2015, due to a foot injury.

== Early life ==
Varley was educated in a boarding school, St. Munchin's College in Limerick where he scored two tries as Munchin's won the Munster Schools Rugby Senior Cup final in 2002. He studied at the University of Limerick.

== Munster ==
Varley made his senior debut for Munster as a replacement in a Celtic League fixture against Ospreys on 5 May 2006.

== London Wasps ==
Varley joined English club side London Wasps on a one-year contract on 26 September 2008, and scored a try for his new club less than a day later in a late win against Leicester Tigers.

== Return to Munster ==
Varley rejoined his native province for the start of the 2009–10 season, and went on to play a total of 22 games for Munster that season, including his Heineken Cup debut as a replacement against Benetton Treviso on 17 October 2009. He started for Munster in their historic 15–6 victory against Australia at Thomond Park on 16 November 2010. Varley also started for Munster when they beat arch-rivals, and newly crowned Heineken Cup champions, Leinster 19–9 in the 2011 Magners League Grand Final. He signed a two-year contract extension with Munster in February 2013. Varley captained Munster in their 2013–14 Heineken Cup 24-16 semi-final defeat to Toulon on 27 April 2014.

== Ireland ==
Varley joined the Ireland squad for the 2010 Summer Tour as cover for Jerry Flannery, and was selected for the New Zealand Barbarians for their match against New Zealand Maori, after the IRFU agreed to release two players for the fixture, but had to withdraw from the squad due to a back injury. He came on as a substitute for Ireland against the Maori a week later, and was named on the bench for Ireland's game against Australia, coming on to win his first cap in the last few minutes. He was named in the Ireland squad for the 2010 Autumn Tests, and came on against Argentina.

Varley was selected in Ireland's training squad for the 2011 Rugby World Cup warm-ups in August, but was left out of the final squad. However, during training at the World Cup, Jerry Flannery suffered an injury and Varley was called up to replace him in the squad. He was selected in the Ireland Wolfhounds squad for their game against England Saxons in January 2012.

Varley was called into Ireland's training squad for the 2013 Six Nations Championship on 21 January 2013. He came on as a replacement during Ireland Wolfhounds friendly with England Saxons on 25 January 2013. Varley was named in the Ireland squad for their 2014 Tour to Argentina on 19 May 2014. He came off the bench in the first test against Argentina on 7 June 2014.
