= Rob Penney =

- Born: 27 April 1964 (age 62) Christchurch, New Zealand
- Height: 1.92 m (6 ft 4 in)
- Weight: 100 kg (220 lb)

Rugby union career
Senior career
Years	Team	Apps	(Points)
1985–1994	Canterbury	101	(177)
1996–1997	Marlborough Rugby Union	N/A	(N/A)
Coaching career
- Years: Team
- 2005: Crusaders (assistant coach)
- 2006–2011: Canterbury (head coach)
- 2011–2012: New Zealand U20 (head coach)
- 2012–2014: Munster (head coach)
- 2014–2019: Shining Arcs (head coach)
- 2020–2021: Waratahs (head coach)
- 2024–: Crusaders (head coach)

Robin Hugh Penney (born 27 April 1964) is a New Zealand professional rugby union coach and former representative player. Generally known as Rob Penney, he played in the positions of Flanker or No.8 throughout his career, most notably for Canterbury. He has served in various coaching roles since 2005. He is the current Head coach of the Crusaders in Super Rugby.

== Playing career ==
Penney played over 100 games for Canterbury between 1985 and 1994 in what was then the First division, the highest level of provincial rugby in New Zealand. Penney also played in an All Black trial in 1992. He later played for Marlborough in lower division rugby in 1996 and 1997.

He played for the Burnside club in Christchurch and Awatere in Marlborough.

== Coaching career ==
=== Canterbury and New Zealand ===
Penney coached Canterbury rugby in New Zealand from 2006 to 2011, and led them to win four ITM Cups in a row from 2008 to 2011. He also coached the New Zealand under-20 rugby union team at the 2012 IRB Junior World Championship in which New Zealand were beaten 16–22 by the hosts, South Africa, in the final.

=== Munster ===
On 3 May 2012, it was announced that Penney would be the new Munster new head coach, signing a two-year contract. He started in the role in July 2012 with Anthony Foley remaining on as forwards coach. On appointing Penney, Munster rugby CEO Garrett Fitzgerald said; "We conducted a thorough search to find a replacement for Tony McGahan and were delighted with the calibre of the candidates".

Penney took charge of his first competitive game as Munster coach on 1 September 2012, in a Rabo Direct Pro 12 match against Edinburgh Rugby at Murrayfield. Despite a slow start, Munster won the game 23–18, to get his coaching career with Munster off to a winning start. Penney's Munster side had a surprise loss in the 2012–13 Heineken Cup on 13 October 2012, when they threw away an early lead against Racing Métro 92 and lost the game 22–17, but crucially secured a losing bonus point. Munster got their campaign back on track against Edinburgh Rugby the next week with a bonus point victory, winning 33–0 on the day and leaving themselves in a strong position to get out of the group stages. A victory and a loss followed in Munster's next two Heineken Cup matches, both against Saracens. Munster secured qualification for the quarter-finals in their last match against Racing Métro 92, beating them 29–6 to arrange a quarter-final against Harlequin F.C. Munster, despite being massive underdogs, beat Harlequins 18–12 to reach the semi-final. Munster lost the semi-final 16–10 to ASM Clermont Auvergne.

In February 2014, Penney announced that he would be leaving Munster at the end of the 2013–14 season, having turned down the option of a third year in charge. Penney won the 2013–14 Pro 12 Coach of the Season Award in May 2014.

=== Shining Arcs ===
The Japanese Top League team NTT Communications Shining Arcs announced Penney as their new head coach for the next season on 11 April 2014.

=== New South Wales Waratahs ===
Penney joined Australian Super Rugby side the Waratahs on a three-year contract in October 2019. On 28 March 2021, the Waratahs sacked Penney as head coach after a struggling 0–5 start to the 2021 Super Rugby AU season. He was replaced by Jason Gilmore and Chris Whitaker as interim coaches for the rest of the season.

=== Crusaders ===
On 6 June, 2023, Penney was appointed as the head coach of the Crusaders, taking over from Scott Robertson who took up the All Blacks coaching role. Penney's assistants are Matt Todd, Dan Perrin, James Marshall, Brad Mooar, and Ryan Crotty. Penney's Crusaders finished the 2024 season having won 4 matches from 14 games. In August 2024, it was confirmed that Penney would fulfil his two-year contract and coach the team for their 2025 season. In the 2025 season, Penney lead the Crusaders to their 15th Championship after only losing 3 games the whole season in a resurging campaign. In July 2025, Penney extended his contract with the Crusaders for the 2026 season.
