= Cian Bohane =

Irish rugby union player

- Born: Cian Bohane; 26 July 1991 (age 35) Cork, Ireland
- Height: 1.88 m (6 ft 2 in)
- Weight: 102 kg (16.1 st; 225 lb)
- School: Presentation Brothers College

Rugby union career
- Position(s): Centre, Wing
Amateur team(s)
Years	Team	Apps	(Points)
2010-2016	Dolphin	69	
Senior career
Years	Team	Apps	(Points)
2013–2017	Munster	9	(5)
- Correct as of 2 October 2016

Cian Bohane (born 26 July 1991) is a former Irish rugby union player. He played primarily as a centre, but could also play on the wing. Bohane played his club rugby with Dolphin.

== Munster ==
Bohane made his debut for Munster A on 13 October 2012, starting against Plymouth Albion in the first round of the 2012–13 British and Irish Cup. He was promoted to the senior Munster squad for the 2013–14 season in April 2013. Bohane his debut for the senior Munster team on 3 May 2013, coming on as a replacement for JJ Hanrahan in the Pro12 fixture against Zebre.

Bohane signed a one-year development contract extension in March 2014. He signed another one-year contract with Munster in January 2015. On 24 September 2016, Bohane made his first start for Munster in their 2016–17 Pro12 fixture against Edinburgh. On 21 April 2017, Bohane captained Munster A to a 29–28 victory over English RFU Championship side Jersey Reds in the final of the 2016–17 British and Irish Cup, which was held in Irish Independent Park. At the end of the 2016–17 season, Bohane retired from rugby.

== Honours ==
=== Munster A ===
- British and Irish Cup:
  - Winner (1): 2016–17
