= 2018–19 Munster Rugby season =

- Ground(s): Thomond Park (Capacity: 25,600); Irish Independent Park (Capacity: 8,008)
- CEO: Garrett Fitzgerald
- Coach: Johann van Graan
- Captain: Peter O'Mahony
- Most appearances: Arno Botha (27)
- Top scorer: Joey Carbery (154)
- Most tries: Two players: Andrew Conway (8); Keith Earls (8)
- League: Pro14
- 2018–19: 2nd (Conf. A), Semi-finals
1st kit	2nd kit

The 2018–19 Munster Rugby season was Munster's eighteenth season competing in the Pro14, alongside which they also competed in the European Rugby Champions Cup. It was Johann van Graan's second season as head coach and his first full season in the role, having joined partway through the previous season.

== Events ==
Munster played two pre-season fixtures ahead of the 2018–19 campaign, the first against London Irish, whose directory of rugby is former Munster and Ireland head coach Declan Kidney, and the second against Exeter Chiefs, which was the first meeting between the two clubs. Munster beat London Irish 32–28, but lost 12–0 against Exeter Chiefs.

Drawn alongside French Top 14 champions Castres and English sides Exeter Chiefs and Gloucester, Munster competed in pool 2 of the 2018–19 European Rugby Champions Cup. Munster opened their 2018–19 Pro14 season with a six-try 38–0 victory against South African side Cheetahs in Thomond Park on 1 September 2018. Rory Scannell, Dave Kilcoyne, Tommy O'Donnell, JJ Hanrahan, Dave O'Callaghan and Man-of-the-Match Darren Sweetnam scored the tries, with Hanrahan adding four conversions, in a match that saw Arno Botha, Mike Haley, Joey Carbery and academy players Shane Daly and Gavin Coombes make their competitive debuts for the province, whilst Neil Cronin also made his first appearance for Munster since March 2015.

Tadhg Beirne made his debut for Munster in the provinces 25–10 defeat away to Glasgow Warriors on 7 September 2018. Munster's 64–7 win against Ulster on 29 September 2018 was a record win for the province in the Pro14; Munster's previous record win being 47–0 against Zebre in 2016. In round one of the 2018–19 Champions Cup on 13 October 2018, a try from CJ Stander and five points from the boot of Joey Carbery secured a 10–10 draw in Sandy Park against Exeter Chiefs, in a match in which Dan Goggin and Neil Cronin made their competitive European debuts, whilst Tadhg Beirne, who was Man-of-the-Match, Mike Haley and Joey Carbery made their European debuts for Munster. One week later, tries from Mike Haley, Rhys Marshall, Joey Carbery, who also kicked four conversions and one penalty in a Man-of-the-Match performance, Sammy Arnold and Andrew Conway helped Munster to a 36–22 bonus-point victory at home against Gloucester.

In the December 2018 back-to-back Champions Cup fixtures against Castres, Munster won 30–5 in round 3 on 9 December, with tries from Rory Scannell, CJ Stander and JJ Hanrahan, who also scored 15 points off the kicking tee. In the return leg away to Castres on 15 December, the French side won 13–12, with Joey Carbery scoring all of Munster's points from penalties. In round 5 of the Champions Cup, Munster beat Gloucester 41–15 away from home on 11 January 2019, with the tries coming from Joey Carbery (2), Rory Scannell, Keith Earls and Andrew Conway and 16 points of the kicking tee from Carbery. In round 6, Munster beat Exeter Chiefs 9–7 in Thomond Park on 19 January 2019 to advance to a record 18th Champions Cup quarter-final. Joey Carbery scored all of Munster's points from penalties in a closely fought, physical game. Munster defeated Edinburgh 17–13 in their quarter-final in Murrayfield Stadium on 30 March 2019 to advance to a 14th Champions Cup semi-final, which Munster lost 32–16 to Saracens in the Ricoh Arena on 20 April 2019.

Munster finished second in conference A in the 2018–19 Pro14 season, with 21 wins and 5 defeats, and beat Italian side Benetton 15–13 in their quarter-final on 4 May 2019, to secure a semi-final against provincial rivals Leinster in the RDS on 18 May 2019. which Leinster won 24–9, bringing to an end Munster's 2018–19 season. During the season, Munster played 31 games, winning 22, losing 8 and drawing 1. The province scored 790 points, including 99 tries, in total, and had the best defensive record during the regular Pro14 season and Champions Cup pool stage, conceding an average of 12 points a game in the latter. In attack, Munster were the third highest try-scorers in the regular Pro14 season with 82 tries in 21 games.

Munster were unbeaten at home all season, winning 10 games in Thomond Park and 4 in Irish Independent Park, and featured in their 18th Champions Cup quarter-final and 14th semi-final, extending records for both. 55 players were used in total throughout the season across all competitions, with 37 of those having followed the Munster pathway into the professional game. 11 players made their debuts for the province: Tadhg Beirne, Arno Botha, Joey Carbery, Mike Haley and Alby Mathewson, as well as 6 academy players: Diarmuid Barron, Craig Casey, Gavin Coombes, Liam Coombes, Shane Daly and Alex McHenry. Stalwart in the second row Billy Holland became the 10th player to win 200 caps for the province, whilst Andrew Conway, JJ Hanrahan, Jack O'Donoghue and Rory Scannell all won their 100th caps for Munster, with Scannell becoming the youngest player to do at the age of 25. Mike Haley played more minutes than any other player during the season, racking up 1,876 in 26 starts.

Internationally, 13 Munster players represented Ireland during the season: Sammy Arnold, Tadhg Beirne, Joey Carbery, Andrew Conway, Keith Earls, Chris Farrell, Dave Kilcoyne, Niall Scannell, Conor Murray, Peter O'Mahony, CJ Stander, Darren Sweetnam and John Ryan. 11 players were involved in the Ireland under-20s team that won a grand slam during the 2019 Six Nations Under 20s Championship: Craig Casey, Seán French, Ben Healy, James McCarthy, Jonathan Wren and Josh Wycherley from the academy, and Jake Flannery, John Hodnett, Conor Phillips, Luke Masters and Billy Scannell were also involved.

There were 6 sell-out attendances during the season at Thomond Park and Irish Independent Park, with all 4 games at the latter selling-out for the first time. Attendance increased by 15% across the season, with a 10% rise in ticket sales. All 3 of Munster's home Champions Cup pool fixtures were the highest attendance for their respective rounds.

== Coaching and management Staff 2018–19 ==
Position	Name	Nationality
Head coach	Johann van Graan	South Africa
Defence coach	JP Ferreira	South Africa
Backs and attack Coach	Felix Jones	Ireland
Forwards coach	Jerry Flannery	Ireland
Team manager	Niall O'Donovan	Ireland
Head of athletic performance	Denis Logan	United States
Senior strength and conditioning coach	Aidan O'Connell	Ireland
Strength and conditioning coach	Adam Sheehan	Ireland
Strength and conditioning coach	PJ Wilson	Ireland
Performance analyst	George Murray	Ireland

== Senior playing squad 2018–19 ==
Munster player movements for the 2018–19 season. For a full list, see List of 2018–19 Pro14 transfers.
(Player's name in italics indicates a transfer that took place during the course of the season)

=== Players in ===
- (Ireland) Tadhg Beirne from (Wales) Scarlets
- (Ireland) Calvin Nash promoted from Academy
- (Ireland) Liam O'Connor promoted from Academy
- (Ireland) Fineen Wycherley promoted from Academy
- (England) Mike Haley from (England) Sale Sharks
- (Ireland) Neil Cronin from (Ireland) Garryowen
- (South Africa) Arno Botha from (England) London Irish
- (Ireland) Joey Carbery from (Ireland) Leinster
- (New Zealand) Alby Mathewson from (France) Toulon (four-month contract)
- (Ireland) Cronan Gleeson (three-month contract)

=== Players out ===
- (Ireland) Simon Zebo to (France) Racing 92
- (Ireland) Robin Copeland to (Ireland) Connacht
- (Ireland) David Johnston to (England) Ealing Trailfinders
- (South Africa) Gerbrandt Grobler to (England) Gloucester
- (Ireland) Stephen Fitzgerald to (Ireland) Connacht (three-month loan)
- (Ireland) Ian Keatley to (England) London Irish (short-term contract)
- (Ireland) Mike Sherry to (England) Gloucester (loan)
- (Ireland) Ronan O'Mahony retired due to injury

The Munster senior squad for 2018–19 is: (Note: Stephen Fitzgerald joined Connacht on a three-month loan in December 2018, which was later extended until the end of the 2018–19 season. Mike Sherry joined Gloucester on loan until the end of the 2018–19 season in March 2019.)

Note: Flags indicate national union under World Rugby eligibility rules. Players may hold more than one non-World Rugby nationality.

Player	Position	Union
Rhys Marshall	Hooker	New Zealand
Kevin O'Byrne	Hooker	Ireland
**Niall Scannell**	Hooker	Ireland
**Mike Sherry**	Hooker	Ireland
**Stephen Archer**	Prop	Ireland
**James Cronin**	Prop	Ireland
Cronan Gleeson	Prop	Ireland
**Dave Kilcoyne**	Prop	Ireland
Jeremy Loughman	Prop	Ireland
Liam O'Connor	Prop	Ireland
Ciaran Parker*	Prop	England
**John Ryan**	Prop	Ireland
Brian Scott	Prop	Ireland
**Tadhg Beirne**	Lock	Ireland
**Billy Holland**	Lock	Ireland
Jean Kleyn	Lock	South Africa
Darren O'Shea	Lock	Ireland
Fineen Wycherley	Lock	Ireland
**Arno Botha**	Back row	South Africa
Chris Cloete	Back row	South Africa
Dave O'Callaghan	Back row	Ireland
**Tommy O'Donnell**	Back row	Ireland
**Jack O'Donoghue**	Back row	Ireland
Conor Oliver	Back row	Ireland
**Peter O'Mahony** (c)	Back row	Ireland
**CJ Stander**	Back row	Ireland

Player	Position	Union
Neil Cronin	Scrum-half	Ireland
James Hart	Scrum-half	Ireland
**Alby Mathewson**	Scrum-half	New Zealand
**Conor Murray**	Scrum-half	Ireland
Duncan Williams	Scrum-half	Ireland
Tyler Bleyendaal*	Fly-half	New Zealand
**Joey Carbery**	Fly-half	Ireland
JJ Hanrahan	Fly-half	Ireland
Bill Johnston	Fly-half	Ireland
**Ian Keatley**	Fly-half	Ireland
**Sammy Arnold**	Centre	Ireland
**Chris Farrell**	Centre	Ireland
Dan Goggin	Centre	Ireland
**Rory Scannell**	Centre	Ireland
**Jaco Taute**	Centre	South Africa
**Andrew Conway**	Wing	Ireland
**Keith Earls**	Wing	Ireland
Calvin Nash	Wing	Ireland
Ronan O'Mahony	Wing	Ireland
**Darren Sweetnam**	Wing	Ireland
Alex Wootton	Wing	Ireland
Stephen Fitzgerald	Fullback	Ireland
Mike Haley*	Fullback	England

- Internationally capped players in **bold**
- Players qualified to play for Ireland on residency or dual nationality *
- Irish provinces are currently limited to four non-Irish eligible (NIE) players and one non-Irish qualified player (NIQ or "Project Player").
- Notes:

== Pre-season ==
17 August 2018
19:30

Munster (Ireland)	32–28	(England) London Irish
	Report

Irish Independent Park
Attendance: 5,773

24 August 2018
19:30

Munster (Ireland)	0–12	(England) Exeter Chiefs
	Report

Irish Independent Park
Attendance: 5,948

== 2018–19 Pro14 ==
2018–19 Pro14 table
Conference A
	Team	P	W	D	L	PF	PA	PD	TF	TA	TBP	LBP	PTS
1	(Scotland) Glasgow Warriors (RU)	21	16	0	5	621	380	+241	83	48	15	2	81
2	(Ireland) Munster (SF)	21	16	0	5	612	348	+264	82	44	11	2	77
3	(Ireland) Connacht (QF)	21	12	0	9	475	394	+81	60	55	7	6	61
4	(Wales) Ospreys (PO)	21	12	0	9	445	404	+41	53	47	6	4	58
5	(Wales) Cardiff Blues	21	10	0	11	497	451	+46	60	58	7	7	54
6	(South Africa) Cheetahs	21	8	1	12	541	606	−65	80	80	9	3	46
7	(Italy) Zebre	21	3	0	18	260	640	−380	35	85	5	2	19
Conference B
	Team	P	W	D	L	PF	PA	PD	TF	TA	TBP	LBP	PTS
1	(Ireland) Leinster (CH)	21	15	1	5	672	385	+287	95	49	12	2	76
2	(Ireland) Ulster (SF)	21	13	2	6	441	424	+17	58	54	6	1	63
3	(Italy) Benetton (QF)	21	11	2	8	474	431	+43	62	55	6	3	57
4	(Wales) Scarlets	21	10	0	11	510	470	+40	68	54	7	5	52
5	(Scotland) Edinburgh	21	10	0	11	431	436	−5	52	59	6	5	51
6	(Wales) Dragons	21	5	1	15	339	599	−260	37	84	1	3	26
7	(South Africa) Southern Kings	21	2	1	18	385	735	−350	54	107	5	7	22
If teams are level at any stage, tiebreakers are applied in the following order -: 1. number of matches won 2. the difference between points for and points against 3. the number of tries scored 4. the most points scored 5. the difference between tries for and tries against 6. the fewest red cards received 7. the fewest yellow cards received
Green background indicates teams that compete in the Pro14 play-offs, and also earn a place in the 2019–20 European Champions Cup (excluding South African teams who are ineligible); Blue background indicates teams outside the play-off places that earn a place in the 2019–20 European Champions Cup; Yellow background indicates the loser of the play-off between the two fourth-ranked European teams in each conference, that earned a place in the 2019–20 European Rugby Challenge Cup. Plain background indicates teams that earn a place in the 2019–20 European Rugby Challenge Cup. (CH) Champions. (RU) Runners-up. (SF) Losing semi-finalists. (QF) Losing quarter-finalists. (PO) Champions Cup play-off winners.

=== Round 1 ===
1 September 2018
17:15

(1 BP) Munster (Ireland)	38–0	(South Africa) Cheetahs
Try: R. Scannell 15' m Kilcoyne 30' c O'Donnell 52' m Hanrahan 65' c O'Callaghan 70' c Sweetnam 72' c Con: Hanrahan (4/6) 31', 66', 71', 73'	Report

Thomond Park
Attendance: 12,265
Referee: Dan Jones (WRU)

=== Round 2 ===
7 September 2018
19:35

Glasgow Warriors (Scotland)	25–10	(Ireland) Munster
Try: Gibbins 22' m Hogg 28' c Ashe 35' c Con: Hogg (2/2) 29', 36'; Pen: P. Horne (1/2) 14'; Hogg (1/1) 72'	Report	Try: Marshall 69' c Con: Carbery (1/1) 70'; Pen: Hanrahan (1/1) 43'

Scotstoun Stadium
Attendance: 7,351
Referee: Ben Whitehouse (WRU)

=== Round 3 ===
14 September 2018
19:35

(1 BP) Munster (Ireland)	49–13	(Wales) Ospreys
Try: Penalty try 15'; Carbery 21' c J. Cronin 27' c Marshall (2) 40'+1 c, 42' c Botha 45' c Sweetnam 62' c Con: Carbery (5/5) 22', 28', 40'+2, 43', 46'; Keatley (1/1) 63'	Report	Try: Morgan 60' c Con: S. Davies (1/1) 61'; Pen: S. Davies (2/2) 20', 26'

Irish Independent Park
Attendance: 8,008
Referee: Stuart Berry (SARU)

=== Round 4 ===
21 September 2018
19:35

(1 BP) Cardiff Blues (Wales)	37–13	(Ireland) Munster
Try: N. Williams 6' c T. Williams (2) 16' c, 76' c Halaholo 44' c Con: Anscombe (3/4) 7', 17', 45', 77'; Pen: Anscombe (3/3) 52', 63', 70'	Report	Try: Conway (2) 10' m, 13' m Pen: Carbery (1/1) 23'

Cardiff Arms Park
Attendance: 7,284
Referee: Quinton Immelman (SARU)

=== Round 5 ===
29 September 2018
19:35

(1 BP) Munster (Ireland)	64–7	(Ireland) Ulster
Try: Goggin (2) 5' c, 37' c O'Donnell (2) 8' c, 30' m P. O'Mahony 50' c Carbery 62' c Arnold 66' c Earls 70' c Wootton 77' c Con: Carbery (5/6) 5', 9', 37', 51', 63; Keatley (3/3) 67', 71', 78'; Pen: Carbery (1/1) 16'	Report	Try: Cave 46' c Con: Burns (1/1) 47'

Thomond Park
Attendance: 13,907
Referee: Dan Jones (WRU)

=== Round 6 ===
6 October 2018
18:00

Leinster (Ireland)	30–22	(Ireland) Munster
Try: Penalty try 10'; Lowe (2) 14' c, 44' c Con: R. Byrne (2/2) 15', 46'; Pen: R. Byrne (3/3) 32', 40'+2, 69'	Report	Try: Beirne 19' m Stander 27' c Mathewson 66' c Con: Carbery (2/3) 28', 67'; Pen: Carbery (1/1) 55'

Aviva Stadium
Attendance: 50,120
Referee: Ben Whitehouse (WRU)

=== Round 7 ===
27 October 2018
17:15

Munster (Ireland)	25–24	(Scotland) Glasgow Warriors (2 BP)
Try: J. Cronin 8' c Wootton 65' m Mathewson 72' c Con: Hanrahan (1/1) 9'; Keatley (1/2) 73'; Pen: Hanrahan (1/1) 55'; R. Scannell (1/1) 80'	Report	Try: G. Horne (2) 23' m, 35' c M. Fagerson 48' m P. Horne 59' c Con: P. Horne (1/3) 36'; Thomson (1/1) 60'

Thomond Park
Attendance: 13,356
Referee: Dan Jones (WRU)

=== Round 8 ===
4 November 2018
14:45

(2 BP) Cheetahs (South Africa)	26–30	(Ireland) Munster (1 BP)
Try: Dweba (2) 26' m, 57' c Nché 51' c Smith 63' c Con: Schoeman (3/4) 52', 58', 64	Report	Try: Botha 15' m O'Byrne 37' c L. Coombes 44' c Haley 68' m Con: Johnston (2/3) 39', 46'; Pen: Johnston (1/1) 10'; R. Scannell (1/1) 76'

Toyota Stadium
Attendance: 3,368
Referee: Marius Mitrea (FIR)

=== Round 9 ===
25 November 2018
15:30

Zebre (Italy)	7–32	(Ireland) Munster (1 BP)
Try: Giammarioli 63' c Con: Brummer (1/1) 64'	Report	Try: F. Wycherley 15' c O'Byrne 29' c R. O'Mahony 72' c R. Scannell 78' m Con: Johnston (2/2) 16', 31'; R. Scannell (1/2) 74'; Pen: Johnston (1/1) 40'+2; R. Scannell (1/1) 69'

Stadio Sergio Lanfranchi
Attendance: 2,400
Referee: Sam Grove-White (SRU)

=== Round 10 ===
30 November 2018
19:35

(1 BP) Munster (Ireland)	44–14	(Scotland) Edinburgh
Try: Farrell (2) 4' m, 77' m Conway (2) 14' c, 18' c Earls (3) 29' m, 33' m, 37' m Bleyendaal 63' m Con: Hanrahan (2/6) 15', 19'	Report	Try: Van der Merwe (2) 20' c, 68' c Con: Van der Walt (1/1) 21'; Baggott (1/1) 69'

Irish Independent Park
Attendance: 8,008
Referee: Nigel Owens (WRU)

=== Round 11 ===
21 December 2018
19:35

Ulster (Ireland)	19–12	(Ireland) Munster (1 BP)
Try: Herring 32' c Baloucoune 60' c Shanahan 76' m Con: Burns (2/3) 34', 61'	Report	Pen: Hanrahan (2/2) 11', 51'; Johnston (2/2) 65', 80'+1

Kingspan Stadium
Attendance: 16,804
Referee: Sean Gallagher (IRFU)

=== Round 12 ===
29 December 2018
17:15

Munster (Ireland)	26–17	(Ireland) Leinster
Try: Cloete 13' c Earls 71' c Con: Carbery (1/1) 15'; Bleyendaal (1/1) 72'; Pen: Carbery (4/4) 34', 39', 43', 64'	Report	Try: Tracy 47' c Deegan 80' c Con: Sexton (1/1) 23'; Frawley (1/1) 80'+1; Pen: Sexton (1/1) 48'

Thomond Park
Attendance: 26,267
Referee: Frank Murphy (IRFU)

=== Round 13 ===
5 January 2019
19:35

(1 BP) Connacht (Ireland)	24–31	(Ireland) Munster (1 BP)
Try: Farrell 9' c Kelleher 41' c Carty 72' c Con: Carty (3/3) 11', 42', 72'; Pen: Carty (1/1) 40'+1	Report	Try: P. O'Mahony 16' c Goggin (2) 24' c, 48' c Carbery 63' c Con: Carbery (4/4) 17', 25', 49', 64'; Pen: Carbery (1/1) 56'

Galway Sportsgrounds
Attendance: 8,129
Referee: Mike Adamson (SRU)

=== Round 14 ===
26 January 2019
15:00

(1 BP) Dragons (Wales)	7–8	(Ireland) Munster
Try: Fairbrother 13' c Con: Lewis (1/1) 14'	Report	Try: Kleyn 62' m Pen: Johnston (1/1) 29'

Rodney Parade
Attendance: 5,013
Referee: Ben Blain (SRU)

=== Round 15 ===
15 February 2019
19:35

(1 BP) Munster (Ireland)	43–0	(South Africa) Southern Kings
Try: N. Cronin 13' c Conway 37' m Sweetnam 54' c Holland 60' m Marshall 66' c Kleyn 70' m R. Scannell 79' c Con: R. Scannell (4/7) 14', 55', 67', 80'	Report

Irish Independent Park
Attendance: 8,008
Referee: Andrea Piardi (FIR)

=== Round 16 ===
22 February 2019
19:35

(1 BP) Ospreys (Wales)	13–19	(Ireland) Munster
Try: Dirksen 18' c Con: Price (1/1) 18'; Pen: Price (2/2) 32', 62'	Report	Try: Sweetnam 4' c Penalty try 36'; Haley 69' m Con: Hanrahan (1/2) 5'

Liberty Stadium
Attendance: 5,432
Referee: Stuart Berry (SARU)

=== Round 17 ===
2 March 2019
17:00

Scarlets (Wales)	10–6	(Ireland) Munster (1 BP)
Try: Nicholas 10' c Con: Halfpenny (1/1) 12'; Pen: Halfpenny (1/1) 48'	Report	Pen: Johnston (2/2) 4', 39'

Parc y Scarlets
Attendance: 8,032
Referee: Mike Adamson (SRU)

=== Round 18 ===
23 March 2019
19:45

(1 BP) Munster (Ireland)	31–12	(Italy) Zebre
Try: Loughman 40'+1 m Marshall 52' c Sweetnam 64' m N. Scannell 68' c Haley 77' c Con: Bleyendaal (3/4) 53', 69', 79'	Report	Try: Elliott 8' m Tenga 18' c Con: Canna (1/2) 18'

Thomond Park
Attendance: 14,226
Referee: Dan Jones (WRU)

=== Round 19 ===
5 April 2019
19:35

(1 BP) Munster (Ireland)	45–21	(Wales) Cardiff Blues
Try: Farrell 17' c Kleyn 29' c Stander 49' c Murray 60' c Conway 65' c Arnold 75' c Con: Bleyendaal (5/5) 17', 30', 50', 60', 66'; Hanrahan (1/1) 77'; Pen: Bleyendaal (1/2) 11'	Report	Try: T. Williams 6' c Summerhill 37' c Lee-Lo 47' c Con: Anscombe (3/3) 7', 39', 47'

Irish Independent Park
Attendance: 8,008
Referee: Marius Mitrea (FIR)

=== Round 20 ===
12 April 2019
19:00

Benetton (Italy)	28–37	(Ireland) Munster (1 BP)
Try: Benvenuti 7' c Ioane 37' m Penalty try 44'; Con: Allan (1/2) 8'; Pen: Allan (3/3) 5', 18', 23'	Report	Try: Marshall 10' c Goggin 13' c S. Daly 60' c Mathewson 67' c Con: Hanrahan (4/4) 11', 13', 61', 68'; Pen: Hanrahan (3/3) 25', 48', 54'

Stadio Comunale di Monigo
Attendance: 5,000
Referee: Ben Whitehouse (WRU)

=== Round 21 ===
27 April 2019
19:35

Munster (Ireland)	27–14	(Ireland) Connacht
Try: Beirne 30' c Haley 36' c Hanrahan 74' c Con: Bleyendaal (2/2) 31', 37'; Hanrahan (1/1) 75'; Pen: Bleyendaal (2/2) 20', 56'	Report	Try: Bealham 23' c E. McKeon 70' c Con: Dean (2/2) 24', 70'

Thomond Park
Attendance: 19,999
Referee: Frank Murphy (IRFU)

=== Quarter-final ===
4 May 2019
15:00

Munster (Ireland)	15–13	(Italy) Benetton
Pen: Bleyendaal (2/2) 22', 43'; Hanrahan (3/3) 62', 65', 76'	Report	Try: Tavuyara 39' c Con: Allan (1/1) 40'; Pen: Allan (2/2) 25', 59'

Thomond Park
Attendance: 10,042
Referee: Nigel Owens (WRU)

=== Semi-final ===
18 May 2019
14:30

Leinster (Ireland)	24–9	(Ireland) Munster
Try: Cronin 54' c Lowe 79' m Con: R. Byrne (1/1) 55'; Pen: R. Byrne (4/4) 2', 34', 40'+6, 45'	Report	Pen: Carbery (3/3) 5', 24', 50'

RDS Arena
Attendance: 18,977
Referee: Mike Adamson (SRU)

== 2018–19 European Rugby Champions Cup ==
Munster faced Castres, Exeter Chiefs and Gloucester in pool 2 of the 2018–19 European Rugby Champions Cup. They were seeded in tier 3 following their fourth-place finish overall and exit from the 2017–18 Pro14 season at the semi-finals stage.

Team	P	W	D	L	PF	PA	Diff	TF	TA	TB	LB	Pts
(Ireland) Munster (5)	6	4	1	1	138	72	66	14	9	2	1	21
(England) Exeter Chiefs	6	2	1	3	124	104	20	18	11	2	2	14
(France) Castres	6	3	0	3	97	142	–45	11	16	1	1	14
(England) Gloucester	6	2	0	4	122	163	–41	15	22	0	0	9

=== Round 1 ===
13 October 2018
15:15

Exeter Chiefs (England)	10–10	(Ireland) Munster
Try: Cowan-Dickie 38' c Con: Steenson (1/1) 39'; Pen: Steenson (1/1) 18'	Report	Try: Stander 63' c Con: Carbery (1/1) 64'; Pen: Carbery (1/1) 31'

Sandy Park
Attendance: 12,749
Referee: Jérôme Garcès (FFR)

=== Round 2 ===
20 October 2018
13:00

(1 BP) Munster (Ireland)	36–22	(England) Gloucester
Try: Haley 21' m Marshall 34' c Carbery 50' c Arnold 55' c Conway 66' c Con: Carbery (4/5) 35', 51', 56', 67'; Pen: Carbery (1/1) 29'	Report	Try: Grobler 62' c Woodward 68' m Morgan 78' c Con: Twelvetrees (2/3) 63', 78'; Pen: Cipriani (1/1) 24'

Thomond Park
Attendance: 23,068
Referee: Alexandre Ruiz (FFR)

=== Round 3 ===
9 December 2018
13:00

Munster (Ireland)	30–5	(France) Castres
Try: R. Scannell 42' c Stander 67' c Hanrahan 74'; Con: Hanrahan (3/3) 44', 68', 75'; Pen: Hanrahan (3/3) 6', 20', 57'	Report	Try: Laveau 80' m

Thomond Park
Attendance: 21,861
Referee: JP Doyle (RFU)

=== Round 4 ===
15 December 2018
17:30

Castres (France)	13–12	(Ireland) Munster (1 BP)
Try: Faʻanunu 23' c Con: Urdapilleta (1/1) 24'; Pen: Urdapilleta (2/3) 10', 56'	Report	Pen: Carbery (4/7) 2', 19', 50', 66'

Stade Pierre-Fabre
Attendance: 9,746
Referee: Wayne Barnes (RFU)

=== Round 5 ===
11 January 2019
19:45

Gloucester (England)	15–41	(Ireland) Munster (1 BP)
Try: Thorley 51' m Balmain 63' c Con: Twelvetrees (1/2) 63'; Pen: Twelvetrees (1/1) 13'	Report	Try: Carbery (2) 23' c, 67' c R. Scannell 40'+2 c Earls 56' c Conway 65' c Con: Carbery (5/5) 24', 40'+3, 57', 66', 68'; Pen: Carbery (2/2) 19', 26'

Kingsholm
Attendance: 15,500
Referee: Romain Poite (FFR)

=== Round 6 ===
19 January 2019
17:30

Munster (Ireland)	9–7	(England) Exeter Chiefs (1 BP)
Pen: Carbery (3/3) 6', 22', 72'	Report	Try: Armand 12' c Con: J. Simmonds (1/1) 13'

Thomond Park
Attendance: 26,267
Referee: Jérôme Garcès (FFR)

=== Quarter-final ===
30 March 2019
12:45

Edinburgh (Scotland) (4)	13–17	(5) (Ireland) Munster
Try: Dean 26' c Con: Van der Walt (1/1) 27'; Pen: Van der Walt (2/2) 35', 50'	Report	Try: Earls (2) 18' c, 70' c Con: Carbery (1/1) 19'; Bleyendaal (1/1) 71'; Pen: Bleyendaal (1/1) 46'

Murrayfield
Attendance: 36,358
Referee: Pascal Gaüzère (FFR)

=== Semi-final ===
20 April 2019
15:00

Saracens (England) (1)	32–16	(5) (Ireland) Munster
Try: Rhodes 42' c B. Vunipola 71' c Con: Farrell (2/2) 43', 73'; Pen: Farrell (6/7) 1', 17', 26', 40', 47', 53'	Report	Try: Sweetnam 60' c Con: Hanrahan (1/1) 62'; Pen: Bleyendaal (2/2) 9', 30'; Murray (1/1) 36'

Ricoh Arena
Attendance: 16,235
Referee: Jérôme Garcès (FFR)
