= 2018–19 European Rugby Champions Cup =

Rugby union competition

2018–19 Heineken Champions Cup

Tournament details
- Countries: England; France; Ireland; Scotland; Wales
- Tournament format(s): Round-robin and knockout
- Date: 12 October 2018 – 11 May 2019

Tournament statistics
- Teams: 20
- Matches played: 67
- Attendance: 1,020,286 (15,228 per match)
- Highest attendance: 51,930 - Saracens v Leinster (Final) (11 May 2019)
- Lowest attendance: 6,383 - Newcastle v Montpellier (21 October 2018)
- Tries scored: 376 (5.61 per match)
- Top point scorer(s): (England) Owen Farrell (Saracens); 89 points
- Top try scorer(s): (Ireland) Jacob Stockdale (Ulster) (Ireland) Seán Cronin (Leinster); 6 tries each

Final
- Venue: St James' Park, Newcastle upon Tyne
- Attendance: 51,930
- Champions: (England) Saracens (3rd title)
- Runners-up: (Ireland) Leinster

The 2018–19 European Rugby Champions Cup (known as the Heineken Champions Cup for sponsorship reasons) is the fifth season of the European Rugby Champions Cup, the annual club rugby union competition run by European Professional Club Rugby (ECPR) for teams from the top six nations in Europe. It is the 24th season of pan-European professional club rugby competition. This competition is the first to be sponsored by Heineken since the 2013–14 season.

The tournament started on 12 October 2018. The final, featuring the last two winners of the event, Saracens and Leinster, took place on 11 May 2019 at St James' Park in Newcastle upon Tyne, England, with Saracens being crowned champions for the third time.

== Teams ==
Twenty clubs from the three major European domestic and regional leagues competed in the Champions Cup. Nineteen of these qualified directly as a result of their league performance.

In a change to previous seasons, the play-off to decide the 20th team was not held. The final place in the Champions Cup is now directly awarded in the following order:

1. Champions Cup winner, if not already qualified
2. Challenge Cup winner, if not already qualified
3. Challenge Cup losing finalist, if not already qualified
4. Challenge Cup semi-finalist, if not already qualified, or the winner of a play-off between both semi-finalists, if both have not already qualified
5. Highest ranked non-qualified club by virtue of league position from the same league as the Champions Cup winner

The distribution of teams is:

- England: 7 clubs
  - The top 6 clubs in the English Premiership. (6 clubs)
  - The runner-up of the 2017–18 Challenge Cup Final, Gloucester. (1 club)
- France: 6 clubs
  - The top 6 clubs in the Top 14. (6 clubs)
- Ireland, Scotland & Wales: 7 clubs, based on performance in the Pro14.
  - Following the inclusion of 2 South African teams into the Pro14, the tournament format and qualification process was changed.
  - The top 3 sides in each Pro14 conference (not including the South African sides, who are not eligible for European competition), automatically qualify for the Champions Cup. The previous requirement for each country (Ireland, Italy, Scotland and Wales) to be represented was waived beginning with this season. (6 Teams)
  - The next best placed eligible team in each conference compete in a one-off play-off game to determine the 7th Pro14 team. (1 Team)

The following teams qualified for the 2018–19 tournament.

Premiership	Top 14	Pro14		
England	France	Ireland	Scotland	Wales
Bath; Exeter Chiefs; Gloucester; Leicester Tigers; Newcastle Falcons; Saracens; Wasps	Castres; Lyon; Montpellier; Racing 92; Toulon; Toulouse	Leinster; Munster; Ulster	Edinburgh; Glasgow Warriors	Cardiff Blues; Scarlets

=== Team details ===
Below is the list of coaches, captain and stadiums with their method of qualification for each team.

Note: Placing shown in brackets, denotes standing at the end of the regular season for their respective leagues, with their end of season positioning shown through CH for Champions, RU for Runner-up, SF for losing Semi-finalist, QF for losing Quarter-finalist, and PO for the Pro14 7th place play-off winner.

Team	Coach / Director of Rugby	Captain	Stadium	Capacity	Method of qualification
(England) Bath	(New Zealand) Todd Blackadder	(England) Matt Garvey	Recreation Ground	14,500	English Premiership top 6 (6th)
(Wales) Cardiff Blues	(Australia) John Mulvihill	(Wales) Ellis Jenkins	Cardiff Arms Park	12,125	Pro14 top three in Conference (4A) (Note: Cardiff qualified as Third in Conference A of the Pro14, the Cheetahs, were ineligible for European Rugby Competitions.)
(France) Castres	(France) Christophe Urios	(Uruguay) Rodrigo Capó Ortega	Stade Pierre-Fabre	12,500	Top 14 top 6 (6th) (CH)
(Scotland) Edinburgh	(England) Richard Cockerill	(Scotland) Stuart McInally	Murrayfield Stadium	67,144	Pro14 top three in Conference (3B) (QF)
(England) Exeter Chiefs	(England) Rob Baxter	(England) Jack Yeandle	Sandy Park	12,800	English Premiership top 6 (1st) (RU)
(Scotland) Glasgow Warriors	(New Zealand) Dave Rennie	(New Zealand) Callum Gibbins	Scotstoun Stadium	7,351	Pro14 top three in Conference (1A) (SF)
(England) Gloucester	(Ireland) David Humphreys	(New Zealand) Willi Heinz	Kingsholm Stadium	16,115	European Rugby Challenge Cup runners-up (Note: Gloucester qualified as Challenge Cup winners Cardiff qualified via the Pro14.)
(England) Leicester Tigers	(Ireland) Geordan Murphy	(England) Tom Youngs	Welford Road	25,849	English Premiership top 6 (5th)
(Ireland) Leinster	(Ireland) Leo Cullen	(Ireland) Johnny Sexton	RDS Arena; Aviva Stadium	18,500; 51,700	Pro14 top three in Conference (1B) (CH)
(France) Lyon	(France) Pierre Mignoni	(France) Julien Puricelli	Stade de Gerland	25,000	Top 14 top 6 (5th) (SF)
(France) Montpellier	(New Zealand) Vern Cotter	(France) Fulgence Ouedraogo	Altrad Stadium	15,697	Top 14 top 6 (1st) (RU)
(Ireland) Munster	(South Africa) Johann van Graan	(Ireland) Peter O'Mahony	Thomond Park	25,600 (Note: Thomond Park's official capacity is 25,600 but can be expanded up to 26,276 with temporary seating.)	Pro14 top three in Conference (2A) (SF)
(England) Newcastle Falcons	(England) Dean Richards	(England) Will Welch	Kingston Park	10,200	English Premiership top 6 (4th) (SF)
(France) Racing 92	(France) Laurent Labit (France) Laurent Travers	(France) Dimitri Szarzewski	Paris La Défense Arena	30,681	Top 14 top 6 (2nd) (SF)
(England) Saracens	(Ireland) Mark McCall	(England) Brad Barritt	Allianz Park	10,000 (Note: Allianz Park typically has a capacity of 10,000 but this can be raised to 15,000 with temporary seating.)	English Premiership top 6 (2nd) (CH)
(Wales) Scarlets	(New Zealand) Wayne Pivac	(Wales) Ken Owens	Parc y Scarlets	14,870	Pro14 top three in Conference (2B) (RU)
(France) Toulon	(France) Patrice Collazo	(France) Mathieu Bastareaud	Stade Mayol	18,200	Top 14 top 6 (4th) (QF)
(France) Toulouse	(France) Ugo Mola (France) Régis Sonnes	(France) Julien Marchand	Stade Ernest-Wallon	19,500	Top 14 top 6 (3rd) (SF)
(Ireland) Ulster	(England) Dan McFarland	(Ireland) Rory Best	Ravenhill Stadium	18,196	Pro14 7th place play off winner (Note: Ulster, as 4th eligible team in Conference B, beat the 4th eligible team in Conference A, the Ospreys, for the 7th qualification position from the Pro14.)
(England) Wasps	(Wales) Dai Young	(England) Joe Launchbury	Ricoh Arena	32,609	English Premiership top 6 (3rd) (SF)

== Seeding ==
The twenty competing teams are seeded and split into four tiers, each containing five teams.

For the purpose of creating the tiers, clubs are ranked based on their domestic league performances and on their qualification for the knockout phases of their championships. For example, a losing quarter-finalist would be seeded below a losing semi-finalist, even if they finished above them in the regular season.

Rank	Top 14	Premiership	Pro14
1	(France) Castres	(England) Saracens	(Ireland) Leinster
2	(France) Montpellier	(England) Exeter Chiefs	(Wales) Scarlets
3	(France) Racing 92	(England) Wasps	(Scotland) Glasgow Warriors
4	(France) Lyon	(England) Newcastle Falcons	(Ireland) Munster
5	(France) Toulouse	(England) Leicester Tigers	(Scotland) Edinburgh
6	(France) Toulon	(England) Bath	(Wales) Cardiff Blues
7		(England) Gloucester	(Ireland) Ulster

Based on these seedings, teams are placed into one of the four tiers, with the top seed clubs being put in Tier 1. The nature of the tier system means that a draw is needed to allocate two of the three second seed clubs to Tier 1 and to allocate one of the three fourth seed clubs to Tier 2. The tiers are shown below. Brackets show each team's seeding and their league (for example, "1 Top 14" indicates the team was seeded 1st from the Top 14).

Tier 1	(England) Saracens (1 Prem)	(Ireland) Leinster (1 Pro14)	(France) Castres (1 Top 14)	(Wales) Scarlets (2 Pro14)	(France) Montpellier (2 Top 14)
Tier 2	(England) Exeter Chiefs (2 Prem)	(England) Wasps (3 Prem)	(Scotland) Glasgow Warriors (3 Pro14)	(France) Racing 92 (3 Top 14)	(England) Newcastle Falcons (4 Prem)
Tier 3	(Ireland) Munster (4 Pro14)	(France) Lyon (4 Top 14)	(England) Leicester Tigers (5 Prem)	(Scotland) Edinburgh (5 Pro14)	(France) Toulouse (5 Top 14)
Tier 4	(England) Bath (6 Prem)	(Wales) Cardiff Blues (6 Pro14)	(France) Toulon (6 Top 14)	(Ireland) Ulster (Play-off Pro14)	(England) Gloucester (CC)

The following restrictions will apply to the draw:

- Each pool will consist of four clubs, one from each Tier in the draw.
- Each pool must have one from each league drawn from Tier 1, 2, or 3. No pool will have a second team from the same league until the allocation of Tier 4 takes place.
- Where two Pro14 clubs compete in the same pool, they must be from different countries.

== Pool stage ==
Locations
Locations of teams of the 2018–19 European Rugby Champions Cup group stage.
Brown: Pool 1; Red: Pool 2; Orange: Pool 3; Yellow: Pool 4; Blue: Pool 5.

The draw took place on 20 June 2018, in Lausanne, Switzerland.

Teams in the same pool play each other twice, at home and away, in the group stage that begins on the weekend of 12–14 October 2018, and continues through to 18–20 January 2019. The five pool winners and three best runners-up progress to the quarter-finals.

Teams are awarded group points based on match performances. Four points are awarded for a win, two points for a draw, one attacking bonus point for scoring four or more tries in a match and one defensive bonus point for losing a match by seven points or fewer.

In the event of a tie between two or more teams, the following tie-breakers are used, as directed by EPCR:

1. Where teams have played each other
  1. The club with the greater number of competition points from only matches involving tied teams.
  2. If equal, the club with the best aggregate points difference from those matches.
  3. If equal, the club that scored the most tries in those matches.
2. Where teams remain tied and/or have not played each other in the competition (i.e. are from different pools)
  1. The club with the best aggregate points difference from the pool stage.
  2. If equal, the club that scored the most tries in the pool stage.
  3. If equal, the club with the fewest players suspended in the pool stage.
  4. If equal, the drawing of lots will determine a club's ranking.

Key to colours
Winner of each pool, advance to quarter-finals.
Three second-place teams with the highest number of points advance to quarter-finals.

=== Pool 1 ===
Team	P	W	D	L	PF	PA	Diff	TF	TA	TB	LB	Pts
(Ireland) Leinster (3)	6	5	0	1	204	88	116	27	10	4	1	25
(France) Toulouse (7)	6	5	0	1	149	136	13	16	15	1	0	21
(England) Bath	6	1	1	4	115	152	–37	14	19	1	3	10
(England) Wasps	6	0	1	5	134	190	–92	13	26	1	1	4

=== Pool 2 ===
Team	P	W	D	L	PF	PA	Diff	TF	TA	TB	LB	Pts
(Ireland) Munster (5)	6	4	1	1	138	72	66	14	9	2	1	21
(England) Exeter Chiefs	6	2	1	3	124	104	20	18	11	2	2	14
(France) Castres	6	3	0	3	97	142	–45	11	16	1	1	14
(England) Gloucester	6	2	0	4	122	163	–41	15	22	0	0	9

=== Pool 3 ===
Team	P	W	D	L	PF	PA	Diff	TF	TA	TB	LB	Pts
(England) Saracens (1)	6	6	0	0	185	81	104	23	10	4	0	28
(Scotland) Glasgow Warriors (8)	6	4	0	2	147	119	28	19	16	3	0	19
(Wales) Cardiff Blues	6	2	0	4	138	174	–36	19	22	2	0	10
(France) Lyon	6	0	0	6	87	183	–96	10	23	0	0	0

=== Pool 4 ===
Team	P	W	D	L	PF	PA	Diff	TF	TA	TB	LB	Pts
(France) Racing 92 (2)	6	5	0	1	196	121	75	26	15	5	1	26
(Ireland) Ulster (6)	6	5	0	1	131	128	3	18	16	2	0	22
(Wales) Scarlets	6	1	0	5	145	170	–25	18	23	1	2	7
(England) Leicester Tigers	6	1	0	5	115	168	–53	14	22	2	1	7

=== Pool 5 ===
Team	P	W	D	L	PF	PA	Diff	TF	TA	TB	LB	Pts
(Scotland) Edinburgh (4)	6	5	0	1	154	83	71	16	11	2	1	23
(France) Montpellier	6	3	0	3	158	116	42	21	11	3	1	16
(France) Toulon	6	2	0	4	134	180	–46	16	21	1	1	10
(England) Newcastle Falcons	6	2	0	4	102	169	–67	10	20	0	1	9

=== Ranking of pool leaders and runners-up ===
Rank	Pool leaders	Pts	Diff	TF
1	(England) Saracens	28	104	23
2	(France) Racing 92	26	75	26
3	(Ireland) Leinster	25	116	27
4	(Scotland) Edinburgh	23	71	16
5	(Ireland) Munster	21	66	14
Rank	Pool runners–up	Pts	Diff	TF
6	(Ireland) Ulster	22	3	18
7	(France) Toulouse	21	13	16
8	(Scotland) Glasgow Warriors	19	28	19
9	(France) Montpellier	16	42	21
10	(England) Exeter Chiefs	14	20	18

== Knock-out stage ==
=== Format ===
The eight qualifiers are ranked according to their performance in the pool stage and compete in the quarter-finals which will be held on the weekend of 28–31 March 2019. The four top teams will host the quarter-finals against the four lower teams in a 1v8, 2v7, 3v6 and 4v5 format.

The semi-finals were played on the weekend of 19–21 April 2019. As in recent seasons, a fixed semi-final bracket was set in advance. Beginning this season, the higher-seeded team received home country/venue advantage for each semi-final, regardless of whether they won their quarter-final at home or on the road. Also new for this season was the EPCR's use of discretion to allow semi-finals to be played at a qualified club's home venue.

The winners of the semi-finals contested the final, at St James' Park, on 11 May 2019.

=== Bracket ===
Quarter-finals
1	(England) Saracens	56
8	(Scotland) Glasgow Warriors	27
4	(Scotland) Edinburgh	13
5	(Ireland) Munster	17
3	(Ireland) Leinster	21
6	(Ireland) Ulster	18
2	(France) Racing 92	21
7	(France) Toulouse	22

Semi-finals
1	(England) Saracens	32
5	(Ireland) Munster	16
3	(Ireland) Leinster	30
7	(France) Toulouse	12

Final
1	(England) Saracens	20
3	(Ireland) Leinster	10

=== Quarter-finals ===
30 March 2019
12:45 GMT UTC+0

Edinburgh (Scotland) (4)	13–17	(5) (Ireland) Munster
Try: Dean 26' c Con: Van der Walt (1/1) 27'; Pen: Van der Walt (2/2) 35', 50'	Report	Try: Earls (2) 18' c, 70' c Con: Carbery (1/1) 19'; Bleyendaal (1/1) 71'; Pen: Bleyendaal (1/1) 46'

Murrayfield Stadium
Attendance: 36,358
Referee: Pascal Gaüzère (FFR)

30 March 2019
15:15 GMT UTC+0

Saracens (England) (1)	56–27	(8) (Scotland) Glasgow Warriors
Try: Williams (2) 4' c, 48' c Strettle (2) 25' m, 56' c Barritt 29' c George 62' c Tompkins 70' c Con: Lozowski (6/7) 5', 30', 49', 57', 63', 71'; Pen: Lozowski (3/3) 14', 42', 54'	Report	Try: Price 1' c G. Horne 66' c M. Fagerson 80' c Con: Hastings (3/3) 2', 67', 80'+2; Pen: Hastings (2/2) 32', 37'

Allianz Park
Attendance: 10,997
Referee: Nigel Owens (WRU)

30 March 2019
17:45 GMT UTC+0

Leinster (Ireland) (3)	21–18	(6) (Ireland) Ulster
Try: R. Byrne 10' m A. Byrne 53' c Con: R. Byrne (1/2) 54'; Pen: R. Byrne (3/4) 30', 34', 71'	Report	Try: Treadwell 5' c Marshall 63' m Con: Cooney (1/2) 6'; Pen: Cooney (2/2) 21', 38'

Aviva Stadium
Attendance: 51,700
Referee: Romain Poite (FFR)

31 March 2019
16:15 CEST UTC+2

Racing 92 (France) (2)	21–22	(7) (France) Toulouse
Try: Thomas 18' c Chat 73' m Con: Machenaud (1/2) 19'; Pen: Machenaud (3/4) 13', 48', 54'	Report	Try: Dupont (2) 6' c, 35' c Médard 30' m Con: Holmes (1/1) 7'; Ntamack (1/2) 36'; Pen: Ramos (1/1) 67'

Paris La Défense Arena
Attendance: 26,092
Referee: Luke Pearce (RFU)

=== Semi-finals ===
20 April 2019
15:15 BST UTC+1

Saracens (England) (1)	32–16	(5) (Ireland) Munster
Try: Rhodes 42' c B. Vunipola 72' c Con: Farrell (2/2) 43', 73'; Pen: Farrell (6/7) 1', 17', 26', 40', 47', 53'	Report	Try: Sweetnam 60' c Con: Hanrahan (1/1) 62' c Pen: Bleyendaal (2/2) 9', 30'; Murray (1/1) 36'

Ricoh Arena
Attendance: 16,235
Referee: Mathieu Raynal (FFR)

21 April 2019
15:15 IST UTC+1

Leinster (Ireland) (3)	30–12	(7) (France) Toulouse
Try: Lowe 13' c McGrath 25' c Fardy 52' c Con: Sexton (3/3) 14', 27', 54'; Pen: Sexton (2/2) 10', 65'; R. Byrne (1/1) 77'	Report	Pen: Ramos (3/3) 5', 30', 44'; Ntamack (1/1) 59'

Aviva Stadium
Attendance: 42,916
Referee: Wayne Barnes (RFU)

=== Final ===
11 May 2019
17:00 BST UTC+1

Saracens (England) (1)	20–10	(Ireland) Leinster
Try: Maitland 40'+2 c B. Vunipola 66' c Con: Farrell (2/2) 40'+4, 67'; Pen: Farrell (2/2) 38', 58'	Report	Try: Furlong 31' c Con: Sexton (1/1) 33'; Pen: Sexton (1/1) 3'

St James' Park, Newcastle
Attendance: 51,930
Referee: Jérôme Garcès (FFR)

== Attendances ==
- Does not include the attendance at the final as it takes place at a neutral venue.

Club	Home Games	Total	Average	Highest	Lowest	% Capacity
(England) Bath	3	40,020	13,340	14,429	12,284	92%
(Wales) Cardiff Blues	3	28,207	9,402	12,018	6,692	78%
(France) Castres	3	28,394	9,465	9,746	9,048	76%
(Scotland) Edinburgh	4	62,019	15,505	36,358	6,803	23%
(England) Exeter Chiefs	3	36,311	12,104	12,749	11,762	95%
(Scotland) Glasgow Warriors	3	22,053	7,351	7,351	7,351	100%
(England) Gloucester	3	37,398	12,466	15,500	9,993	77%
(England) Leicester Tigers	3	58,887	19,629	20,146	18,832	76%
(Ireland) Leinster	5	171,425	34,285	51,700	18,055	92%
(France) Lyon	3	37,895	12,632	13,031	12,197	51%
(France) Montpellier	3	26,173	8,724	10,450	7,800	56%
(Ireland) Munster	3	71,205	23,735	26,276	21,861	92%
(England) Newcastle Falcons	3	20,251	6,750	7,174	6,383	66%
(France) Racing 92	4	70,216	17,554	26,092	13,168	57%
(England) Saracens (Note: Saracens attendance figures include semi-final 'home game' played at the Ricoh Arena in Coventry.)	5	55,760	11,152	16,235	8,528	82%
(Wales) Scarlets	3	23,572	7,857	8,087	7,421	53%
(France) Toulon	3	38,107	12,702	13,572	11,439	70%
(France) Toulouse	3	53,343	17,781	18,754	16,737	91%
(Ireland) Ulster	3	42,118	14,039	16,842	12,124	77%
(England) Wasps	3	44,822	14,941	16,002	13,599	46%

== Player scoring ==
- Appearance figures also include coming on as substitutes (unused substitutes not included).

=== Most points ===
Rank	Player	Team	Apps	Points
1	(England) Owen Farrell	Saracens	7	89
2	(South Africa) Jaco van der Walt	Edinburgh	7	73
3	(France) Thomas Ramos	Toulouse	8	72
4	(Ireland) Joey Carbery	Munster	7	70
5	(Scotland) Adam Hastings	Glasgow Warriors	6	61
6	(South Africa) Ruan Pienaar	Montpellier	6	56
7	(Ireland) Johnny Sexton	Leinster	6	53
8	(Scotland) Finn Russell	Racing 92	7	48
9	(Wales) Gareth Anscombe	Cardiff Blues	5	44
10	(England) George Ford	Leicester Tigers	5	43

=== Most tries ===
Rank	Player	Team	Apps	Tries
1	(Ireland) Jacob Stockdale	Ulster	7	6
1	(Ireland) Seán Cronin	Leinster	9	6
2	(South Africa) Henry Immelman	Montpellier	5	5
2	(Wales) Steff Evans	Scarlets	6	5
2	(Argentina) Juan Imhoff	Racing 92	6	5
2	(Scotland) Sean Maitland	Saracens	7	5
2	(Ireland) Simon Zebo	Racing 92	7	5
2	(France) Antoine Dupont	Toulouse	8	5
3	(Wales) Aled Summerhill	Cardiff Blues	4	4
3	(New Zealand) Johnny McNicholl	Scarlets	5	4
3	(New Zealand) James Lowe	Leinster	6	4
3	(France) Virimi Vakatawa	Racing 92	6	4
3	(France) Maxime Médard	Toulouse	7	4
3	(France) Sofiane Guitoune	Toulouse	8	4

== Season records ==
=== Team ===
Largest home win – 49 points

52–3 Leinster at home to Wasps on 12 October 2018

Largest away win – 26 points

41–15 Munster away to Gloucester on 11 January 2019

Most points scored – 56 points

56–27 Saracens at home to Glasgow Warriors on 30 March 2019

Most tries in a match – 8

Leinster at home to Wasps on 12 October 2018

Most conversions in a match – 6 (3)

Leinster at home to Wasps on 12 October 2018
Leinster at home to Bath on 15 December 2018
Saracens at home to Glasgow Warriors on 30 March 2019

Most penalties in a match – 6

Saracens at home to Munster on 20 April 2019

Most drop goals in a match – 1

Castres at home to Exeter Chiefs on 20 October 2018
Lyon at home to Saracens on 13 January 2019

=== Player ===
Most points in a match – 26

(Ireland) Joey Carbery for Munster at away to Gloucester on 11 January 2019

Most tries in a match – 2

Multiple players

Most conversions in a match – 6

(England) Alex Lozowski for Saracens at home to Glasgow Warriors on 30 March 2019

Most penalties in a match – 6

(England) Owen Farrell for Saracens at home to Munster on 20 April 2019

Most drop goals in a match – 1 (2)

(France) Julien Dumora for Castres at home to Exeter Chiefs on 20 October 2018
(France) Jonathan Wisniewski for Lyon at home to Saracens on 13 January 2019

=== Attendances ===
Highest – 51,930

Saracens versus Leinster on 11 May 2019 (Final)

Lowest – 6,383

Newcastle Falcons at home to Montpellier on 21 October 2018

Highest average attendance — 34,285

Leinster

Lowest average attendance — 6,750

Newcastle Falcons

== See also ==
- 2018–19 European Rugby Challenge Cup
- 2018–19 European Rugby Continental Shield
