= JP Ferreira =

South African rugby union coach

- Born: 21 June 1983 (age 43)
- School: Pretoria Boys High School
- University: University of Pretoria

Rugby union career
Senior career
Years	Team	Apps	(Points)
- Bridgend
- Blue Bulls
- Leopards
- Falcons
Coaching career
- Years: Team
- 2007–2017: Lions (Defence coach)
- 2017–2022: Munster (Defence coach)
- 2022–: Bath (Defence coach)

JP Ferreira (born in 1983) is a South African rugby union coach, currently the defence coach for Bath.

== Playing career ==
Ferreira played rugby for the University of Pretoria alongside future Munster coaching colleague Johann van Graan, mostly as a fullback or wing. He had also accepted a trial with Welsh side Bridgend after leaving school, spending seven months with the club before returning to South Africa. Ferreira was then invited to join the Blue Bulls, featuring for their under-19s and under-20s, as well as training with the Springboks 7s team. He moved to the Leopards after being overlooked for promotion to the Bulls, before joining the Falcons, playing his final game for them in 2007.

== Coaching career ==
=== 2007–2017 : Falcons and Lions ===
After suffering a knee injury playing for the Falcons in 2005, Ferreira offered to carry out analysis for the team after their previous analyst had left. When he retired from playing in 2007, Ferreira was offered an analyst position with the Lions, where his role gradually changed to include coaching. When Johan Ackermann took over as head coach of the Lions in 2012, he made Ferreira the sides permanent defence coach as well as their head analyst and, under their guidance, the Lions reached consecutive Super Rugby finals in 2016 and 2017. Despite losing both finals, the Lions had the best defensive records during both seasons.

=== 2017–2022 : Munster ===
Ferreira left the Lions in December 2017 to join Irish province Munster, who compete in the United Rugby Championship and Champions Cup, and where Ferreira's former UP teammate Johann van Graan is head coach, as their new defence coach, replacing Jacques Nienaber. He joined on a contract until June 2020, which was extended in October 2019 until June 2022. During Ferreira's first full season with Munster - 2018–19 - the province boasted the best defence during the regular 2018–19 Pro14 season and the 2018–19 European Rugby Champions Cup pool stage. Ferreira left Munster upon the conclusion of the 2021–22 season.

=== 2022– : Bath ===
Ferreira joined English Premiership Rugby club Bath as their new defence coach from the 2022–23 season. In making the move to England, Ferreira joined former Munster head coach Johann van Graan, who also left the province at the end of the 2021–22 season.

== Personal life ==
Ferreira's mother is former tennis player Brigitte Cuypers, who won the South African Open three times during her career. He is the older brother of Morné Ferreira, who is a rugby referee.
