= Peter O'Mahony =

Irish rugby union player (born 1989)

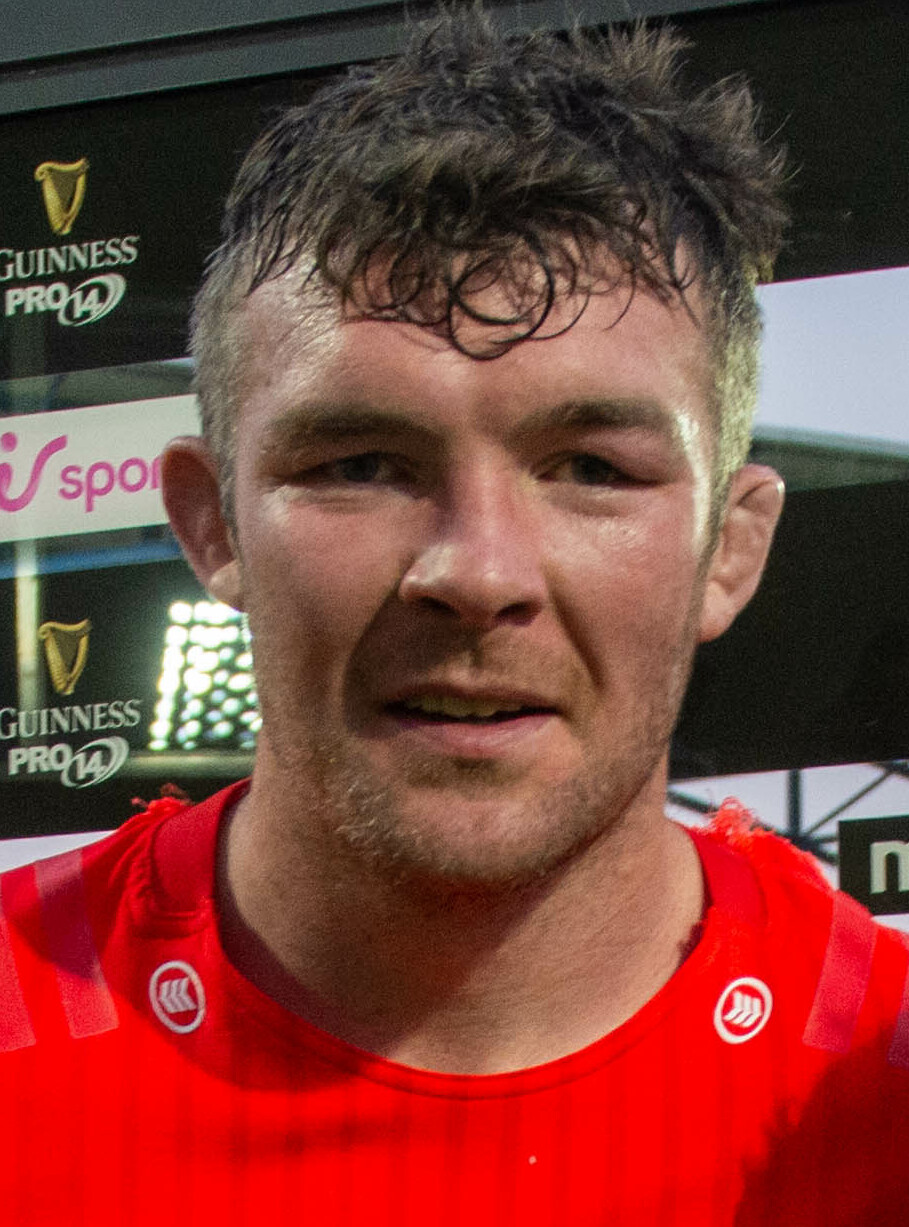
- O'Mahony representing Munster during the Pro14 Rainbow Cup
- Born: Peter James O'Mahony; 17 September 1989 (age 37) Cork, Ireland
- Height: 1.91 m (6 ft 3 in)
- Weight: 108 kg (17.0 st; 238 lb)
- School: Presentation Brothers College

Rugby union career
- Position: Flanker
Amateur team(s)
Years	Team	Apps	(Points)
- Cork Constitution
Senior career
Years	Team	Apps	(Points)
2010–2025	Munster	197	(85)
- Correct as of 31 May 2025
International career
Years	Team	Apps	(Points)
2009	Ireland U20	8	(0)
2012–2025	Ireland	114	(25)
2017	British & Irish Lions	1	(0)
- Correct as of 15 March 2025

Peter James O'Mahony (born 17 September 1989) is an Irish retired professional rugby union player who played as a flanker for Munster and for the Ireland national team.

O'Mahony played as a flanker. During his career, O'Mahony has captained Presentation Brothers College, Ireland U18, Ireland U20, Munster, Ireland and the British & Irish Lions. He formerly represented Cork Constitution in the All-Ireland League.

== Early career ==
O'Mahony was born in Cork, where he attended Presentation Brothers College. He went on to enter the Munster academy in 2008 and captained the Ireland under-20s in the 2009 Six Nations Under-20s Championship and 2009 IRB Junior World Championship. O'Mahony won the 2009–10 All-Ireland Cup with Cork Constitution and was named player of the match in the final. He was also part of the Cork Constitution team that won the 2009–10 All-Ireland League alongside current Munster teammates Stephen Archer and Simon Zebo and former teammates Duncan Williams, Ian Nagle, Tom Gleeson, and Brian Hayes.

== Munster ==
=== 2010–2015 ===
O'Mahony made his Munster debut against Ulster on 2 January 2010, coming on as a replacement for James Coughlan. He captained Munster A to the final of the inaugural British and Irish Cup in the 2009–10 season. O'Mahony was promoted to a full development contract with Munster for the 2010–11 season. He was an integral part of the team when the internationals were away for the 2010 November Tests, putting in a big performance in Munster's historic 15–6 victory against Australia, a game which was also O'Mahony's first start for Munster.

O'Mahony captained Munster in their opening Pro12 match against Dragons in September 2011, and continued to captain Munster whilst their international contingent were away at the 2011 Rugby World Cup. He made his Heineken Cup debut for Munster against Northampton Saints on 12 November 2011, a game in which he won the Man-of-the-Match award. He scored his first try for Munster on 19 November 2011, in Munster's second Heinken Cup Pool One game against Castres. O'Mahony won the Munster Young Player of the Year for the 2011–12 season. He captained Munster in their 2011–12 Pro12 away play-off semi-final against Ospreys on 11 May 2012, which Munster lost 45–10.

O'Mahony started for Munster in their opening fixture of the 2012–13 Heineken Cup on 13 October 2012, a 22–17 defeat at the hands of Racing 92. He scored a try in their 33–0 win against Edinburgh in round 2 on 21 October 2012. He started in the 15–9 win against Saracens on 8 December 2012, and also in the reverse fixture a week later, which Munster lost 19–13. O'Mahony started against Edinburgh in the 26–17 round 5 victory, and also started in the crucial 29–6 win against Racing 92 that secured Munster a place in the quarter-finals. He signed a new two-year contract with the IRFU in January 2013. O'Mahony continued to start for Munster in the knockout-stage of the 2012–13 tournament, playing a crucial role in their 18–12 away quarter-final victory against Harlequins on 7 April 2013. He also started the semi-final against Clermont Auvergne on 27 April 2013, which Munster lost 16–10.

O'Mahony was named as the new Munster captain on 30 July 2013, replacing former All Black Doug Howlett, who retired at the end of the 2012–13 season. He started for Munster against Edinburgh in the opening round of the 2013–14 Heineken Cup on 12 October 2013, captaining the side during their 29–23 defeat. He moved to number 8 for Munster's second-round game against Gloucester on 19 October 2013, which Munster won 26–10. He started against Perpignan on 8 December 2013, captaining the side to a 36–8 win. O'Mahony started the reverse fixture away to Perpignan on 14 December 2013.

O'Mahony started the 20–7 away win against Gloucester on 11 January 2014, scoring a try in a win that secured quarter-final qualification. O'Mahony started against Edinburgh on 19 January 2014, scoring a try in the 38–6 round 6 win that secured a home quarter-final. O'Mahony started in Munster's 47–23 Heineken Cup quarter-final win against Toulouse on 5 April 2014, but went off with a shoulder injury in the 18th minute. The injury meant O'Mahony was ruled out of the remainder of the season as he had to have reconstructive surgery on his shoulder. He also had surgery on his right shoulder to repair a long-standing issue. O'Mahony was nominated for the IRUPA Players' Player of the Year 2014 award on 23 April 2014.

O'Mahony returned from injury on 4 October 2014, coming on as a replacement against Leinster. He started in Munster's first European Rugby Champions Cup game against Sale Sharks on 18 October 2014. O'Mahony started against Saracens in round 2 of the Champions Cup on 24 October 2014. He started against Clermont Auvergne on 6 December 2014. O'Mahony also started in the reverse fixture against Clermont on 14 December 2014.

O'Mahony started against Saracens on 17 January 2015. O'Mahony started at Number 8 against Sale Sharks on 25 January 2015. O'Mahony signed a new three-year contract with Munster and the IRFU in February 2015.

=== 2015–2021 ===
O'Mahony made his comeback from the knee injury he suffered with Ireland during the 2015 Rugby World Cup on 1 October 2016, coming on as a replacement for Billy Holland in the 2016–17 Pro12 fixture against Zebre. On 1 April 2017, O'Mahony was captain in Munster's 41–16 2016–17 European Rugby Champions Cup quarter-final victory against Toulouse, though he went off during the second-half with a leg injury. Fortunately, the injury wasn't serious and O'Mahony was able to lead Munster in their Champions Cup semi-final against Saracens on 22 April 2017, which the defending champions won 26–10 in the Aviva Stadium, ending Munster's European season. On 27 May 2017, O'Mahony captained Munster against Scarlets in the 2017 Pro12 Grand Final, which the Welsh side won 46–22. O'Mahony signed a new three-year contract with the IRFU in December 2017. He was Man-of-the-Match in Munster's 25–16 away win against Leicester Tigers in the 2017–18 European Rugby Champions Cup on 17 December 2017.

O'Mahony won his 100th cap for Munster on 26 December 2017, doing so when he started against Leinster in a 2017–18 Pro14 fixture. O'Mahony was Man-of-the-Match in Munster's 20–19 Champions Cup quarter-final win against Toulon on 31 March 2018. For his performances throughout the 2018–19 season, O'Mahony was presented with the Munster Men's Player of the Year award in late April 2019, adding to the Young Player of the Year award he won in 2012. He was also named in the 2018–19 Pro14 Dream Team in May 2019.

O'Mahony was sent off in Munster's opening 2020–21 Pro14 fixture against Scarlets on 3 October 2020 after receiving two yellow cards. Despite this, Munster won the game 30–27, and a Pro14 judicial officer subsequently ruled that the two yellow cards were sufficient and no ban was necessary. He signed a two-year contract extension with the IRFU in March 2021, a deal that will see O'Mahony remain with Munster until at least June 2023. O'Mahony won his 150th cap for Munster in their 20–18 win against provincial rivals Connacht in round 4 of the 2021–22 United Rugby Championship on 16 October 2021, which also marked the fifth anniversary of former Munster player and coach Anthony Foley's passing.

=== 2022–present ===
Having missed the first leg of Munster's 2021–22 Champions Cup round of 16 fixture away to English club Exeter Chiefs due to injury, which the hosts won 13–8, O'Mahony returned for the second leg one week later on 16 April 2022 to lead from the front and earn the player of the match award in the province's 26–10 home win, which secured a 34–23 aggregate win and a record-equallinging 19th Champions Cup quarter-final for Munster.

O'Mahony won the player of the match award in Munster's Champions Cup quarter-final defeat against defending champions Toulouse on 7 May 2022. The match was tied 24–24 after extra-time, and Toulouse won the penalty shootout 4–2, but O'Mahony's performance during the match, which included four turnovers and a huge defensive effort, garnered widespread praise, with both Munster head coach Johann van Graan and O'Mahony's former British & Irish Lions teammate Sam Warburton calling him a "warrior". O'Mahony signed a one-year contract extension with the IRFU and Munster in February 2023, meaning he will remain with the province for the 2023–24 season. He captained Munster in their 19–14 win against the Stormers in the final of the 2022–23 United Rugby Championship on 27 May 2023.

In February 2025, he announced he would retire from professional rugby following the conclusion of the 2024–25 season.

== Ireland ==
O'Mahony captained Ireland at under-18 and under-20 levels, before being called up to the senior side in 2012. He made his full debut against Italy on 25 February 2012, coming on as a replacement for Seán O'Brien. He made his first start for Ireland in the game against Scotland on 10 March 2012, after an injury to Seán O'Brien. By the end of Ireland's tour of New Zealand in 2012, he had played in all three back-row positions. O'Mahony won the IRUPA Young Player of the Year award for the 2011–12 season. He also played in the 2012 November Tests against South Africa and Argentina.

In the 2013 Six Nations Championship O'Mahony played in all five games as Ireland finished fifth. He also featured in the 2013 Ireland tour to North America, and was made captain after Rory Best was called up to the 2013 British & Irish Lions squad. In the 2013 Autumn Tests he scored his first try for Ireland, in a game against Samoa.

O'Mahony featured in four of Ireland's games, picking up a Man-of-the-Match award against Wales, in their championship-winning 2014 Six Nations. After playing against South Africa and Australia in the 2014 Guinness Series O'Mahony started every game in the 2015 Six Nations Championship as Ireland retained their title, the first time Ireland had won back-to-back championships since 1948–49.

O'Mahony was selected in the final 31-man squad for the 2015 Rugby World Cup, and started pool games against Canada, Italy, and France, but went off with a knee injury during the second-half against France and was ruled out for the remainder of the World Cup.

On 26 October 2016, O'Mahony was named in Ireland's squad for the 2016 end-of-year rugby union internationals. On 12 November 2016, O'Mahony made his return to the senior Ireland team, captaining them in the 52–21 win against Canada. On 23 January 2017, O'Mahony was named in the Ireland squad for the opening two rounds of the 2017 Six Nations Championship. On 18 March 2017, O'Mahony was Man-of-the-Match in Ireland's 13–9 win against England, a victory that denied England consecutive Grand Slams in the Six Nations.

O'Mahony started in Ireland's wins against South Africa and Argentina during the 2017 Autumn Internationals. O'Mahony started every game for Ireland as they won a Grand Slam in the 2018 Six Nations Championship. At the end of the game against England, O'Mahony gave his winner's medal to an Irish supporter with Down syndrome. In the absence of the injured Rory Best, O'Mahony captained Ireland to a historic 2–1 series victory against Australia in June 2018, Ireland's first since 1979, with O'Mahony also winning his 50th test cap for Ireland in the third test. During the 2018 Autumn Tests, O'Mahony started in Ireland's 28–17 win against Argentina on 10 November, and was Man-of-the-Match in Ireland's 16–9 win against New Zealand on 17 November, a win that was O'Mahony's first against the All Blacks and Ireland's first ever win in Dublin against New Zealand.

O'Mahony was ever-present for Ireland during the 2019 Six Nations Championship, starting in the 32–20 opening defeat against England, the 22–13 win against Scotland, the 26–16 win against Italy, the 26–14 win against France and the 25–7 defeat against Wales in the final round, a victory that saw the Welsh win the grand slam. He was selected in the 31-man Ireland squad for the 2019 Rugby World Cup, having featured in the warm-up matches against England and Wales, captaining Ireland in the latter. During the World Cup itself, O'Mahony started in Ireland's opening 27–3 win against Scotland their shock 19–12 defeat against hosts Japan, and in the 35–0 win against Russia, before featuring off the bench in Ireland's 47–5 win against Samoa in their final pool game, and starting in the comprehensive 46–14 defeat against New Zealand in the quarter-finals, which brought an end to Ireland's 2019 World Cup.

Retained by new head coach Andy Farrell in his squad for the 2020 Six Nations Championship, O'Mahony featured off the bench in Ireland's 19–12 opening win against Scotland on 1 February 2020, then started in their 24–14 win against defending champions Wales on 8 February, and their 24–12 defeat against England, before the tournament was suspended due to the COVID-19 pandemic. The tournament eventually resumed in October 2020, with O'Mahony featuring off the bench in Ireland's 50–17 win against Italy and the 35–27 defeat against France in their final fixture of the tournament.

With the usual format of end-of-year international tests not possible due to the COVID-19 pandemic, Ireland instead participated in the Autumn Nations Cup. O'Mahony started in the 32–9 opening win against Wales on 13 November and in the 18–7 defeat against England on 21 November, featured off the bench in the 23–10 win against Georgia on 29 November, and returned to the starting line-up for the 31–16 win against Scotland on 5 December, which secured a third-place finish for Ireland in the tournament.

In Ireland's opening 2021 Six Nations game away to Wales on 7 February 2021, O'Mahony was sent-off in the 14th minute for making contact with the head of Wales prop Tomas Francis when attempting to clear him (Francis) out in a ruck. He was subsequently banned until 14 March 2021. The red card was the first received by an Ireland player in a Five/Six Nations match since Willie Duggan's in 1977. He returned from the ban to feature as a replacement in the 32–18 win against England in the final round.

During the 2021 July rugby union tests, O'Mahony started in Ireland's 39–31 win against Japan before commencing his off-season. During the 2021 Autumn Nations Series, O'Mahony featured off the bench in Ireland's 60–5 win against Japan on 6 November and in the famous 29–20 win against New Zealand on 13 November, before replacing the injured Jack Conan to start in the 53–7 win against Argentina in Ireland's final fixture of the series on 21 November.

O'Mahony featured as a replacement in Ireland's 29–7 win against Wales in their opening fixture of the 2022 Six Nations Championship on 5 February, and in their 30–24 defeat away to France on 12 February, though he left the field with a head injury shortly after coming on. With regular captain Johnny Sexton on the bench and vice-captain James Ryan injured, O'Mahony captained Ireland in their 57–6 home win against Italy on 27 February, and he retained his place in the starting XV in the 32–15 away win against England on 12 March, before being used as a replacement again in the 26–5 home win against Scotland on 19 March that secured the Triple Crown for Ireland.

O'Mahony was selected in the squad for the 2022 Ireland rugby union tour of New Zealand, and started in the 42–19 defeat against New Zealand in the first test on 2 July. O'Mahony also started in Ireland's historic 23–12 win in the second test on 9 July, in what was Ireland's first ever away win against New Zealand, and in the 32–22 third test win against New Zealand on 16 July that secured Ireland's historic first ever series win in New Zealand.

During the 2022 Autumn Nations Series, O'Mahony started for Ireland in their 19–16 win against world champions South Africa on 5 November. Following a pre-match injury to regular captain Johnny Sexton, O'Mahony captained Ireland in their 13–10 win against Australia on 19 November.

O'Mahony continued to start for Ireland in their opening fixture of the 2023 Six Nations Championship against Wales on 4 February, being replaced by Leinster's Jack Conan during the second-half of Ireland's 34–10 away win, before also starting in the 32–19 win against France in round two on 11 February. O'Mahony featured as a replacement in Ireland's 34–20 away win against Italy in round three on 25 February, before returning to the starting XV for the 22–7 away win against Scotland on 12 March and the 29–16 home win against England on 18 March, the latter of which secured the grand slam for Ireland. O'Mahony was one of ten Ireland players selected in the 2023 Six Nations Team of the Championship.

During the 2023 Rugby World Cup warm-up matches, O'Mahony started for Ireland in their 29–10 win against England on 19 August and featured as a replacement in their 17–13 against Samoa on 26 August before being selected in Ireland's 33-man squad for the 2023 Rugby World Cup. He started in Ireland's opening fixture of the tournament against Romania on 9 September, scoring two tries and earning the player of the match award in their 82–8 win, the 59–16 win against Tonga on 16 September, the 13–8 win against South Africa on 23 September, the 36–14 win against Scotland on 7 October, in which O'Mahony made his 100th appearance for Ireland, and the 28–24 defeat against New Zealand in the quarter-finals on 14 October.

On 17 January 2024, it was announced that O'Mahony would be the new captain of Ireland for that year’s Six Nations Championship. Ireland went on to win the tournament after achieving four wins. O'Mahony said in a post-match interview amid speculation of his international retirement, "If it was my last one, it wasn't a bad one to go out on," he said. "I can hang the jersey in a good place, if it was." He did not retire but in October 2024, but relinquished the captaincy to Caelan Doris.

In February 2025, he made his first appearance in the 2025 Six Nations starting in a 32–18 away victory over Scotland. After the game, he recalled being booed off the pitch by Scottish fans as being "one of the biggest compliments" of his career. Later that month, he announced he would be retiring from international duty alongside teammates Conor Murray and Cian Healy following the end of the tournament. In his final game for Ireland, he came off the bench during a 22–17 victory over Italy in the final round of the tournament.

== British & Irish Lions ==
In April 2017, O'Mahony was selected in Warren Gatland's 41-man squad for the 2017 British & Irish Lions tour to New Zealand. On 7 June 2017, O'Mahony made his non-test debut for the Lions when he came off the bench against the Blues in Eden Park. On 10 June, O'Mahony made his first start for the Lions, doing so in the match against the Crusaders in AMI Stadium. On 17 June, O'Mahony captained the Lions in their game against the Māori All Blacks in Rotorua International Stadium. In doing so, he became the first Munster player since Paul O'Connell in 2013 to captain a Lions team. O'Mahony played for 64 minutes, before being replaced by tour captain Sam Warburton, and led the side to a record 32–10 victory against the Māori. On 24 June, O'Mahony captained the Lions in their 30–15 first test defeat against New Zealand in Eden Park. He became the 11th Irishman to captain a British & Irish Lions test team and the first Cork Constitution player to do the same since Tom Kiernan in 1968. However, O'Mahony was dropped from the squad altogether for the second and third tests, with O'Mahony's former Ireland teammate Brian O'Driscoll, himself dropped by Gatland before the third Lions test in 2013, remarking that there "has to be someone to point the finger at in defeat".

== Statistics ==
=== International analysis by opposition ===
Against	Played	Won	Lost	Drawn	Tries	Points	% Won
Argentina	5	5	0	0	0	0	100
Australia	8	6	2	0	0	0	75
Canada	3	3	0	0	0	0	100
England	16	7	9	0	0	0	43.75
France	12	8	2	2	0	0	66.67
Georgia	1	1	0	0	0	0	100
Italy	9	8	1	0	1	5	88.89
Japan	3	2	1	0	0	0	66.67
New Zealand*	13	4	9	0	0	0	30.77
Romania	1	1	0	0	2	10	100
Russia	1	1	0	0	1	5	100
Samoa	3	3	0	0	1	5	100
Scotland	14	13	1	0	0	0	92.86
South Africa	7	5	2	0	0	0	71.43
Tonga	1	1	0	0	0	0	100
United States	1	1	0	0	0	0	100
Wales	15	10	5	0	0	0	66.67
Total	113	79	32	2	5	25	69.91

Correct as of 24 February 2025 * indicates inclusion of caps for British & Irish Lions

== Honours ==
=== Presentation Brothers College ===
- Munster Schools Rugby Senior Cup:
  - Winner (1): 2007

=== Cork Constitution ===
- All-Ireland Cup:
  - Winner (1): 2009–10
- All-Ireland League:
  - Winner (1): 2009–10

=== Munster ===
- United Rugby Championship:
  - Winner (2): 2010–11, 2022–23

=== Ireland ===
- Six Nations Championship:
  - Winner (5): 2014, 2015, 2018, 2023, 2024
- Grand Slam:
  - Winner (2): 2018, 2023
- Triple Crown:
  - Winner (4): 2018, 2022, 2023, 2025

=== British & Irish Lions ===
- British & Irish Lions tours:
  - Tourist (1): 2017

=== Individual ===
- Munster Rugby Young Player of the Year:
  - Winner (1): 2012
- Munster Rugby Men's Player of the Year:
  - Winner (1): 2019
