= Duncan Williams (rugby union) =

Irish rugby union player (born 1986)

- Born: 17 April 1986 (age 40) Douglas, Cork, Ireland
- Height: 1.75 m (5 ft 9 in)
- Weight: 80 kg (13 st; 180 lb)
- School: Christian Brothers College

Rugby union career
- Position: Scrum-half
Amateur team(s)
Years	Team	Apps	(Points)
20??–present	Cork Constitution		
Senior career
Years	Team	Apps	(Points)
2009–2019	Munster	163	(35)
- Correct as of 23 March 2019

Duncan Williams (born 17 April 1986) is an Irish rugby union player. He plays as a scrum-half and represents Cork Constitution in the All-Ireland League.

== Munster ==
Williams made his Munster debut against Connacht in December 2009. He made his Heineken Cup debut against London Irish in October 2010. Williams also started against Australia in Munster's historic 15–6 victory over them in November 2010. He scored his first try for Munster in their 35–12 win against Scarlets in September 2011. He signed a two-year contract extension with Munster in March 2012.

He started for Munster A in their 31–12 2011–12 British and Irish Cup Final win against Cross Keys on 27 April 2012. On 28 February 2014, it was announced that Williams had signed a new one-year contract with Munster, which would see him remain in the province until at least June 2015. He signed a two-year contract extension in February 2015. On 2 January 2016, Williams earned his 100th cap for Munster when he came off the bench against Ulster. On 24 January 2017, it was announced that Williams had signed a contract extension which would see him remain with Munster until June 2019.

On 1 April 2017, Williams was a late replacement for the injured Conor Murray in Munster's line-up for the 2016–17 European Rugby Champions Cup quarter-final against Toulouse. Munster went on to win the game 41–16 and progress to the semi-finals. Williams earned his 150th cap for Munster on 10 February 2018, doing so when he started in the provinces' 33–5 win against Zebre in the 2017–18 Pro14. Facial injuries suffered during training initially ruled Williams out for the remainder of the 2017–18 season, as surgery was required, but he made a faster-than-expected recovery and returned to full training late in April. Williams was released by Munster at the end of the 2018–19 season.

After his release by Munster, Williams continued playing rugby at an amateur level for Cork Constitution. He had decided to retire from playing rugby after Con's All-Ireland League Division 1A final against Clontarf in May 2019, but after Con won the final 28–13 to secure their second AIL title in three years, Williams extended his playing career into the 2019–20 season, and he started in the 24–17 win against Young Munster in the final of the Munster Senior Cup in December 2019, a victory that secured a 30th title for the Cork side.
