= Conor Murray =

British Lions & Ireland international rugby union player

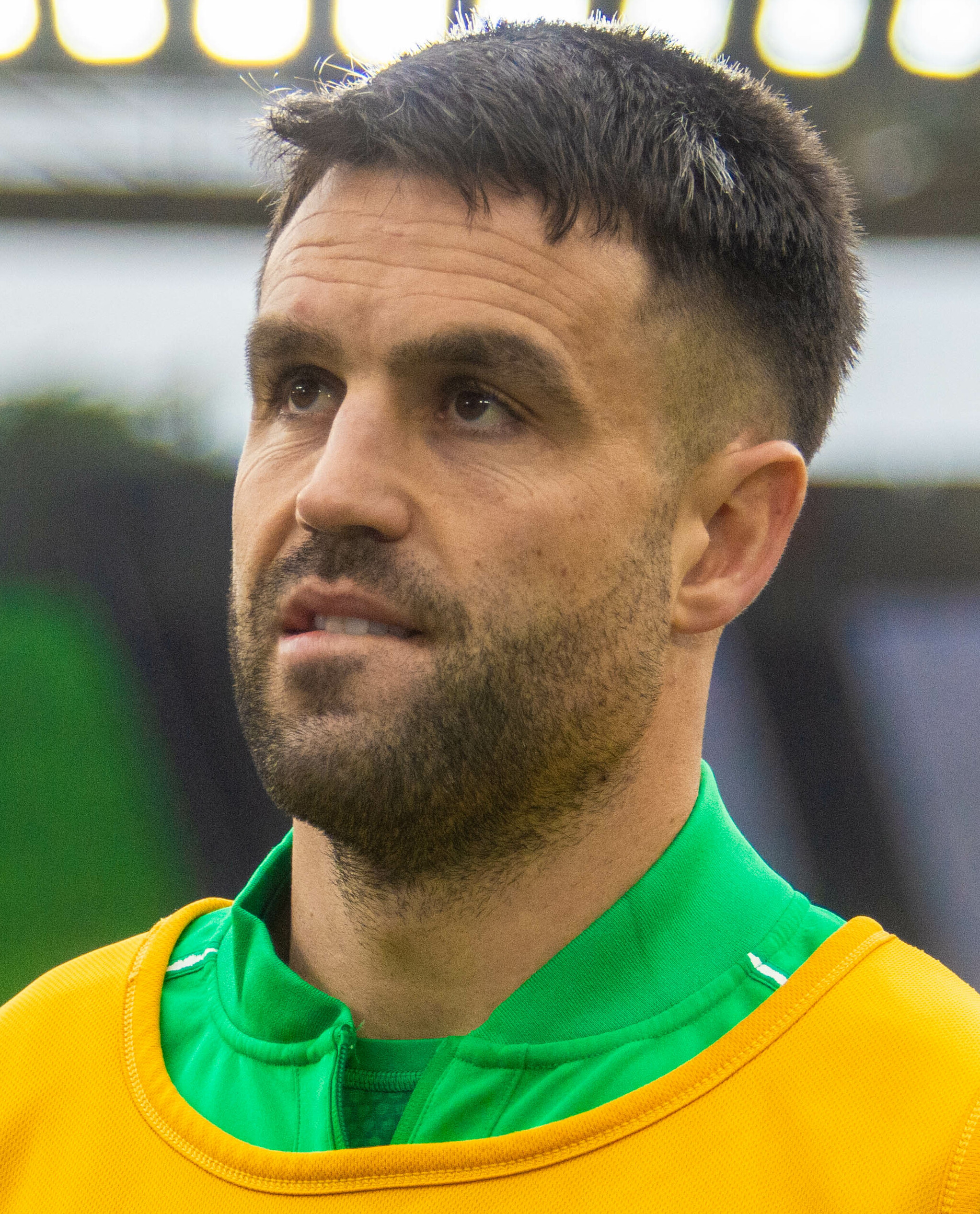
- Murray representing Ireland during the Six Nations
- Full name: Gerard Conor Murray
- Born: 20 April 1989 (age 37) Limerick, Ireland
- Height: 1.88 m (6 ft 2 in)
- Weight: 93 kg (205 lb; 14 st 9 lb)
- School: St Munchin's College
- University: University of Limerick

Rugby union career
- Position: Scrum-half
Senior career
Years	Team	Apps	(Points)
2010-2025	Munster	207	(198)
- Correct as of 31 May 2025
International career
Years	Team	Apps	(Points)
2009	Ireland U20	8	(24)
2011–2025	Ireland	125	(115)
2013, 2017, 2021	British & Irish Lions	8	(5)
- Correct as of 15 March 2025

Gerard Conor Murray (born 20 April 1989) is a former Irish rugby union player who played as a scrum-half for United Rugby Championship club Munster and the Irish National team.

== Early life ==
Murray was born in Limerick, where he attended St Munchin's College and was part of the same Munster Schools Rugby Senior Cup squad as former Munster and Ireland teammate Keith Earls.

== Munster ==
=== 2010–2015 ===
Murray made his competitive debut for Munster against Connacht in the Celtic League on 18 April 2010, coming on as a blood replacement. He part of the Munster A team that lost the final of the 2009–10 British and Irish Cup to Cornish Pirates on 16 May 2010. Murray came off the bench to replace Duncan Williams during Munster's historic 15–6 victory against Australia on 16 November 2010. He made his European debut against Brive in April 2011. On 28 May 2011, he started at scrum-half against Leinster in the 2011 Celtic League Grand Final, which Munster won 19–9 in Thomond Park. In his first full season with Munster, Murray won the John McCarthy Award for Academy Player of the Year.

Murray made his Heineken Cup debut for Munster against Northampton Saints on 12 November 2011. He won the Man-of-the-Match award for Munster in their Heineken Cup round 4 match against Scarlets on 18 December 2011. Murray made his comeback from the knee injury he suffered in the 2012 Six Nations in the Heineken Cup quarter-final against Ulster on 8 April 2012. He scored his first try for Munster in the United Rugby Championship league fixture against Glasgow Warriors on 14 April 2012. Murray won another Man-of-the-Match award in Munster's league game against Ulster on 5 May 2012.

During Munster's first 2012–13 Heineken Cup game on 13 October 2012 against Racing 92, Murray gave away a penalty late in the game to give Racing the lead, and they went on to achieve an unlikely win. His performance improved in Munster's second pool match against Edinburgh on 21 October, with Murray scoring Munster's first of four tries in a 33–0 bonus-point victory. Murray scored a try in Munster's crucial victory against Edinburgh on 13 January 2013, and he scored again as Munster beat Racing 92 29–6 to secure a place in the quarter-finals. He started in Munster 18–12 Heineken Cup quarter-final victory over Harlequins on 7 April 2013. Murray also started the 16–10 semi-final defeat to Clermont Auvergne.

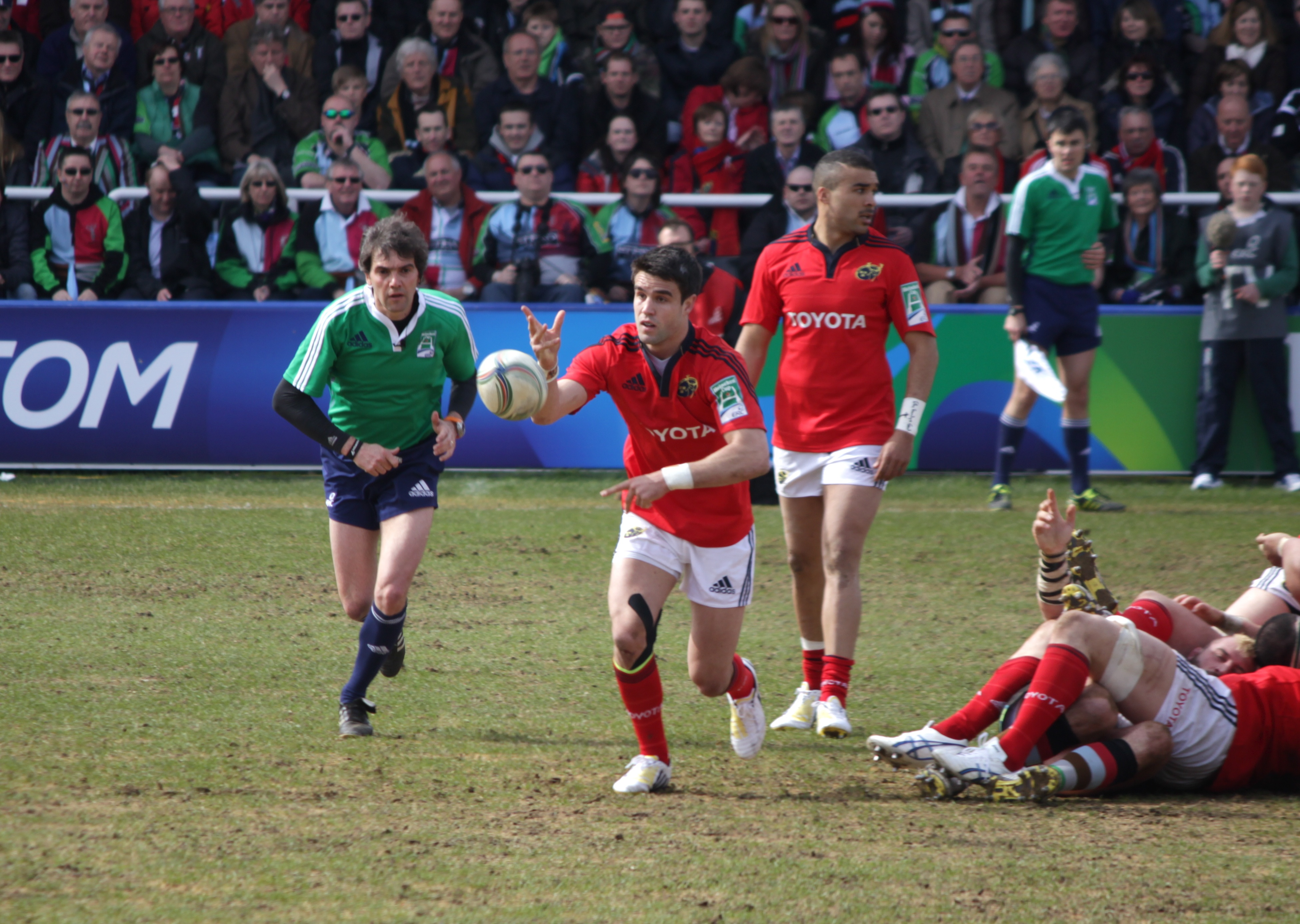
Conor Murray playing scrum-half for Munster

Murray started for Munster against Edinburgh in their opening round 29–23 defeat in the 2013–14 Heineken Cup on 12 October 2013. He again started for Munster in the second-round game against Gloucester on 19 October 2013, which Munster won 26–10. He started Munster's 36–8 win against Perpignan on 8 December 2013, but went off injured in the first-half. Murray signed a new two-year contract with Munster and the IRFU in December 2013. As a result of a knee injury he suffered against Perpignan, Murray was ruled out for six weeks.

Murray returned to full training on 6 January 2014, two weeks ahead of schedule. Murray started the 20–7 away win against Gloucester on 11 January 2013, a win that secured quarter-final qualification. He started against Edinburgh on 19 January 2014, scoring a try in the 38–6 round 6 win that secured a home quarter-final. Murray started in Munster's 47–23 Heineken Cup quarter-final win against Toulouse on 5 April 2014. He started in Munster's 24–16 semi-final defeat against Toulon on 27 April 2014. He converted two tries for Munster in their 55–12 win against Edinburgh on 3 May 2014. Murray won the 2014 Munster Senior Player of the Year Award on 8 May 2014.

Murray captained Munster against Ospreys on 27 September 2014. He was Man-of-the-Match in Munster's 34–23 win against Leinster on 4 October 2014. Murray started in Munster's first European Rugby Champions Cup game against Sale Sharks on 18 October 2014, scoring a try. He started against Saracens in round 2 of the Champions Cup on 24 October 2014, earning the Man-of-the-Match award in the 14–3 win for Munster. Murray started against Clermont Auvergne on 6 December 2014. He also started in the reverse fixture against Clermont on 14 December 2014.

Murray was ruled out of the game against Saracens on 17 January 2015 with a neck injury. He also missed the final pool game against Sale Sharks on 25 January 2015 because of the injury. Murray scored a try and won the Man-of-the-Match award in Munster's 34–3 win against Edinburgh on 11 April 2015. He scored a hat-trick of tries and won the Man-of-the-Match award in Munster's 50–27 win against Dragons on 16 May 2015.

Murray started the opening pool game of the 2015–16 European Rugby Champions Cup against Benetton on 14 November 2015. He started against Leicester Tigers in the Champions Cup on 12 December 2015.

=== 2016–2025 ===
Murray signed a new three-year contract with Munster and the IRFU in January 2016. On 24 September 2016, Murray scored two tries in Munster's 28–14 win against Edinburgh. On 6 May 2017, Murray made his return from the injury he sustained during the 2017 Six Nations when he came off the bench in Munster's 2016–17 Pro12 fixture against Connacht. On 10 May 2017, Murray won the Rugby Players Ireland Players' Player of the Year Award, becoming the third Munster player in a row to win the accolade after CJ Stander (2016) and Paul O'Connell (2015). On 27 May 2017, Murray won his 100th cap for Munster when he started against Scarlets in the 2017 Pro12 Grand Final, which the Welsh side won 46–22.

Murray won the Rugby Writers of Ireland Player of the Year award in October 2017. Murray scored Munster's first try in their 20–19 win against Toulon in the quarter-finals of the 2017–18 European Rugby Champions Cup on 31 March 2018. He scored a try and a 65th minute 57-metre penalty to earn Munster a 19–17 away win against Cheetahs on 13 April 2018, a win that secured a home quarter-final for the province in the league play-offs. Murray was nominated for the Rugby Players Ireland Players' Player of the Year award, an accolade he'd won the previous season, when the nominees were announced in April 2018.

Murray signed a contract extension with Munster and the IRFU in September 2018. Having missed the opening stages on the 2018–19 season due to a neck injury, including the 2018 Autumn Tests, Murray made his return from injury during Munster's Pro14 round 9 fixture against Italian side Zebre, featuring off the bench and replacing Neil Cronin in the second half of the provinces 32–7 away win. Murray won his 50th Champions Cup cap in Munster's 9–7 victory against Exeter Chiefs during round 6 of the 2018–19 tournament on 19 January 2019, a result that ensured Munster advanced to a record 18th Champions Cup quarter-final.

Murray earned his 150th cap for Munster in their 24–20 home defeat against provincial rivals Connacht in round 3 of the Pro14 Rainbow Cup on 14 May 2021. He signed a contract extension with Munster and the IRFU in December 2021, a deal that will see Murray remain with his home province until at least July 2024. He started in Munster's 19–14 win against the Stormers in the final of the 2022–23 United Rugby Championship on 27 May 2023.

In February 2025, he announced he would be leaving Munster at the end of the season to pursue an opportunity abroad following the conclusion of the 2024–25 season. In September 2025, he announced his retirement from professional rugby.

== Ireland ==
=== 2011–2014 ===
Murray was selected in Ireland's training squad for the 2011 Rugby World Cup warm-ups in August. He made his Ireland debut against France as a substitute on 13 August 2011. His second cap came two weeks later against England, again as a substitute. He was also selected in Ireland's final 30-man squad for the World Cup in New Zealand. Murray's first start, and third cap, came against the United States in Ireland's opening Pool C match of the 2011 Rugby World Cup. Murray came off the bench during Ireland's historic 15–6 victory against Australia at the World Cup. He started for Ireland in their final Pool C game against Italy, putting a strong performance as Ireland won 36–6. He was retained as scrum-half in Ireland's quarter-final against Wales, which Ireland lost 22–10.

Murray was selected in Ireland's 24-man squad for the 2012 Six Nations Championship. He made his Six Nations debut when he started for Ireland in their opening match against Wales on 5 February 2012, a game which Ireland lost 23–21. A knee injury sustained in the Test against France on 4 March 2012 ruled Murray out for the remainder of the 2012 Six Nations, as the injury required a recovery period of 3–4 weeks. Murray retained the Ireland number 9 jersey for the first test against New Zealand on 9 June 2012. He also started the second test against New Zealand a week later and, during the game, scored his first try for Ireland. Murray started the third test, which Ireland lost 60–0, their heaviest ever defeat.

Murray continued in the number 9 jersey for Ireland's opening 2012 Autumn Series test against South Africa on 10 November 2012. Murray also started in Ireland's uncapped friendly against Fiji on 17 November 2012, and against Argentina on 24 November 2012.

Murray was named in Ireland's training squad for the 2013 Six Nations Championship on 17 January 2013. He started at scrum-half for Ireland's opening 30–22 win against Wales on 2 February 2013, their 12–6 defeat to England on 10 February 2013, and the 12–8 loss to Scotland. He put in an outstanding performance to win the Man-of-the Match award in Ireland's 13–13 draw with France. He started in Ireland's final game of the tournament, a 22–15 loss to Italy, on 16 March 2013.

On 23 October 2013, Murray was named in the Ireland squad for the 2013 Autumn Tests. He started against Samoa on 9 November 2013. He came off the bench against Australia on 16 November 2013. Murray regained his starting place for the test against New Zealand on 24 November 2013, scoring his second try for Ireland during the game, which New Zealand narrowly won 24–22.

On 27 January 2014, Murray was named in Ireland's 34-man squad for the opening two fixtures of the 2014 Six Nations Championship. He started against Scotland on 2 February 2014. Murray started against Wales on 8 February 2014. Murray started in the 13–10 loss to England on 22 February 2014. He started against Italy on 8 March 2014. Murray started the 22–20 win away to France on 15 March 2014, a win that secured the 2014 Championship for Ireland.

Murray was named in the Ireland squad for their 2014 Tour to Argentina on 19 May 2014. He started the first test against Argentina on 7 June 2014. Murray was named in the Ireland squad for the 2014 Autumn Series on 21 October 2014. He started in the 29–15 win against South Africa on 8 November 2014, setting up Tommy Bowe's try. Murray also started in the 26–23 win against Australia on 22 November 2014.

=== 2015–2018 ===
Murray was named in the Ireland squad for the opening rounds of the 2015 Six Nations Championship on 1 February 2015. He started against Italy on 7 February 2015, scoring a try in Ireland's 26–3 win. Murray started against France on 14 February 2015. He started in the 19–9 win against England on 1 March 2015. Murray started against Wales on 14 March 2015. He started against Scotland on 21 March 2015. England's failure to score enough points against France meant Ireland won the 2015 Six Nations Championship, the first time Ireland have won back-to-back championships since 1948–49. Murray was nominated for the IRUPA Players' Player of the Year 2015 Award in April 2015.

Murray was named in the 45-man training squad for the 2015 Rugby World Cup on 24 June 2015. He started the warm-up game against Wales on 29 August 2015. Murray was selected in the final 31-man squad for the World Cup when it was announced on 1 September 2015. He started in the final warm-up game against England on 5 September 2015. Murray started the opening pool game against Canada on 19 September 2015. He came off the bench in the second pool game against Romania on 27 September 2015. Murray started against Italy on 4 October 2015. He started against France on 11 October 2015, scoring the second try in Ireland's 24–9 win. Murray started for Ireland in their 43–20 quarter-final defeat against Argentina on 18 October 2015.

On 20 January 2016, Murray was named in Ireland's 35-man squad for the 2016 Six Nations Championship. On 7 February 2016, Murray started against Wales in Ireland's opening match of the Six Nations, scoring a try in the 16–16 draw. On 13 February 2016, Murray started against France in Ireland's second game of the Six Nations. On 27 February 2016, Murray scored a try in Ireland's 21–10 defeat against England. Murray was nominated for the 2016 6 Nations Player of the Tournament award, alongside Ireland teammate Johnny Sexton.

On 25 May 2016, Murray was named in the 32-man Ireland squad to tour South Africa in a 3-test series. On 11 June 2016, Murray started in the first test against South Africa, scoring a try in Ireland's historic 26–20 win. On 26 October 2016, Murray was named in Ireland's squad for the 2016 end-of-year rugby union internationals. On 5 November 2016, Murray started in Ireland's test against New Zealand at Soldier Field, Chicago, scoring a try and a penalty in a 40–29 win that was Ireland's first ever against the All Blacks. On 23 January 2017, Murray was named in the Ireland squad for the opening two rounds of the 2017 Six Nations Championship. On 25 February 2017, Murray scored a try and earned the Man-of-the-Match award in Ireland's 19–9 win against France. Following his performances in the tournament, Murray was nominated for the 2017 RBS 6 Nations Player of the Championship award, alongside teammate CJ Stander.

Murray started in Ireland's wins against South Africa and Argentina during the 2017 Autumn Internationals. Murray started every game for Ireland as they won a Grand Slam in the 2018 Six Nations Championship, scoring tries against Italy and Scotland, whilst also earning the Man-of-the-Match award against Italy and scoring penalties against Wales and England. He started in all three tests in Ireland's historic 2–1 series victory against Australia in June 2018.

=== 2019–2025 ===
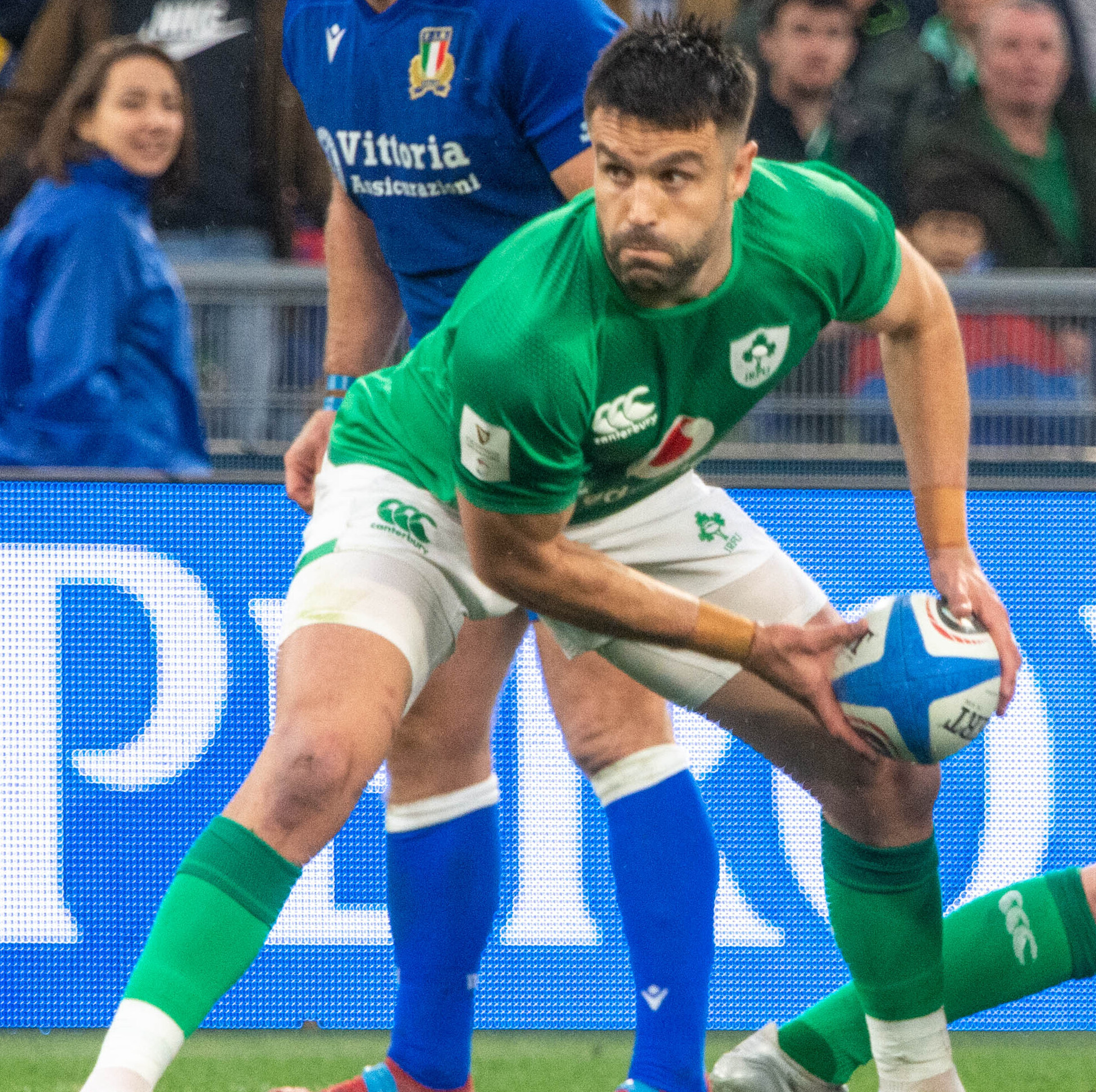
Conor Murray playing during Ireland's 2023 Six Nations match against Italy

Murray was ever-present for Ireland during the 2019 Six Nations Championship, starting in the 32–20 opening defeat against England, the 22–13 win against Scotland, the 26–16 win against Italy, the 26–14 win against France and the 25–7 defeat against Wales in the final round, a victory that saw the Welsh win the grand slam. He was selected in the 31-man Ireland squad for the 2019 Rugby World Cup, having featured in the warm-up match against England and the second warm-up against Wales. During the World Cup itself, O'Mahony started in Ireland's opening 27–3 win against Scotland, their shock 19–12 defeat against hosts Japan, the 47–5 win against Samoa in their final pool game, and in the comprehensive 46–14 defeat against New Zealand in the quarter-finals, which brought an end to Ireland's 2019 World Cup.

Retained by new head coach Andy Farrell in his squad for the 2020 Six Nations Championship, Murray started in Ireland's 19–12 opening win against Scotland on 1 February 2020, and in their 24–14 win against defending champions Wales on 8 February, and their 24–12 defeat against England, before the tournament was suspended due to the COVID-19 pandemic. The tournament eventually resumed in October 2020, with Murray starting in Ireland's 50–17 win against Italy and the 35–27 defeat against France in their final fixture of the tournament.

With the usual format of end-of-year international tests not possible due to the COVID-19 pandemic, Ireland instead participated in the Autumn Nations Cup. Murray was used as a replacement in the 32–9 opening win against Wales on 13 November and in the 18–7 defeat against England on 21 November, then started in the 23–10 win against Georgia on 29 November, and the 31–16 win against Scotland on 5 December, which secured a third-place finish for Ireland in the tournament. Murray was named in World Rugby's Men's 15s Team of the Decade for 2010–2019 in December 2020.

Murray started in Ireland's 21–16 defeat against Wales in their opening 2021 Six Nations Championship fixture, however, Murray sustained a hamstring during training which ruled him out of Ireland's next three fixtures, though he returned from the injury to start for Ireland in their 32–18 win against England in the final round. During the 2021 Autumn Nations Series, Murray featured as a replacement in Ireland's 60–5 win against Japan on 6 November, and in the famous 29–20 win against New Zealand on 13 November, before replacing the injured Jamison Gibson-Park to start in the 53–7 win against Argentina in Ireland's final fixture of the series on 21 November.

Murray featured as a replacement in Ireland's 29–7 win against Wales in their opening fixture of the 2022 Six Nations Championship on 5 February, their 30–24 defeat away to France on 12 February, their 32–15 away win against England on 12 March, and the 26–5 home win against Scotland on 19 March that secured the Triple Crown for Ireland. He was selected in the squad for the 2022 Ireland rugby union tour of New Zealand, and featured off the bench in the 42–19 defeat against New Zealand in the first test on 2 July. Murray also featured off the bench in Ireland's historic 23–12 win in the second test on 9 July, in what was Ireland's first ever away win against New Zealand, and in the 32–22 third test win against New Zealand on 16 July that secured Ireland's historic first ever series win in New Zealand. Murray earned his 100th cap for Ireland when he started in their 2022 Autumn Nations Series fixture against South Africa on 5 November 2022, though he left the field injured during the first half of Ireland's 19–16 win. That injury subsequently ruled Murray out of the remaining Autumn Nations Series matches.

After Jamison Gibson-Park pulled out before kick-off due to injury, Murray was promoted to the starting XV for Ireland's opening fixture of the 2023 Six Nations Championship against Wales on 4 February, being replaced by Munster teammate Craig Casey during the second half of Ireland's 34–10 away win. With Gibson-Park also ruled out of the round two fixture at home to France on 11 February, Murray retained his place in Ireland's starting XV. There was doubt as to whether or not Murray would be available for the match after his father, Gerry, was involved in a road collision with a truck whilst cycling and suffered serious injuries, however, Murray was able to start in Ireland's 32–19 win before being replaced during the second-half. Murray featured as a replacement in Ireland's 34–20 away win against Italy in round three on 25 February, before returning to the starting XV for the 22–7 away win against Scotland on 12 March. With Gibson-Park selected to start in Ireland's final fixture of the tournament against England on 18 March, Murray was used as a replacement in the 29–16 home win that secured the grand slam for Ireland.

During the 2023 Rugby World Cup warm-up matches, Murray featured as a replacement in Ireland's 29–10 win against England on 19 August before starting in their 17–13 win against Samoa on 26 August. He was selected in Ireland's 33-man squad for the 2023 Rugby World Cup, and featured as a replacement in their opening 82–8 win against Romania on 9 September, before starting in the 59–16 win against Tonga in Ireland's second pool game on 16 September, and featuring off the bench in the 13–8 win against South Africa on 23 September, the 36–14 win against Scotland on 7 October, and the 28–24 defeat against New Zealand in the quarter-finals on 14 October.

In February 2025, he announced, alongside teammates Cian Healy and Peter O'Mahony that he would be retiring from international rugby following the conclusion of the 2025 Six Nations Championship. In his final game for Ireland, he came off the bench during a 22–17 victory over Italy in the final round of the tournament.

== British & Irish Lions ==
=== 2013 ===
Murray was selected as one of three scrum-halves in the squad for 2013 British & Irish Lions tour to Australia, named on 30 April 2013. He came on as a substitute in the opening fixture of the tour against the Barbarians on 1 June 2013. Murray started in the Lions 69–17 victory against Western Force on 5 June 2013. He started against Combined New South Wales–Queensland Country on 11 June 2013, scoring his first try for the Lions in the 64–0 tour match win. Murray came off the bench against Brumbies on 18 June 2013. He started against Melbourne Rebels on 25 June 2013, scoring his second try of the tour during the game. Murray came off the bench during the second test against Australia to win his first cap for the Lions on 29 June 2013. He also came off the bench during the Lions third test victory, a win which secured the series win for the Lions.

=== 2017 ===
In April 2017, Murray was selected in the British & Irish Lions squad for the 2017 tour to New Zealand, his second Lions call-up. On 10 June 2017, Murray made his first appearance and start for the Lions on the tour, doing so in the match against the Crusaders in AMI Stadium. On 17 June, Murray made his second appearance of the tour, starting in the Lions record 32–10 victory against the Māori All Blacks in Rotorua International Stadium. On 24 June, Murray started for the Lions in their 30–15 first test defeat against New Zealand in Eden Park, making his first test start for the side. On 1 July, Murray started the second test against the All Blacks, scoring a try in the Lions 24–21 victory in Westpac Stadium. It was the Lions' first test win against New Zealand since 1993 and the first time New Zealand had lost a test at home since losing to South Africa in 2009. Murray's try made him the first northern hemisphere player to score four tries against New Zealand. On 8 July, Murray started in the third and final test, a 15–15 draw which meant the series against the All Blacks ended in a draw as well.

=== 2021 ===
Murray was selected for his third British & Irish Lions tour when the squad for the 2021 tour to South Africa was announced in May 2021. Following original captain Alun Wyn Jones' injury in the warm-up match against Japan on 26 June, Murray was made the new captain by head coach by Warren Gatland, with Gatland citing the regard Murray is held in by his fellow players and his previous Lions experience as factors in the decision, whilst Murray himself described becoming Lions captain as an "unbelievable honour". Extraordinarily, Jones recovered from his injury in time to rejoin the tour before the tests and resumed the captaincy.

Murray made his first appearance of the 2021 tour in the aforementioned 28–10 warm-up win against Japan on 26 June, before featuring off the bench in the 71–31 win against the Sharks on 10 July and starting in the 17–13 defeat against South Africa 'A' on 14 July. To the surprise of some, Scottish scrum-half Ali Price was selected ahead of Murray to start the first test against South Africa on 24 July, though Murray featured off the bench to help the Lions close out a 22–17 win against the Springboks. The victory made Murray one of only ten players to have won a Lions test match against all three of Australia, New Zealand and South Africa. Murray was restored to the starting XV ahead of the second test, which South Africa won 27–9 on 31 July to take the series to a deciding third test, for which head coach Gatland again selected Ali Price to start, with Murray coming on as a replacement in South Africa's tense 19–16 win, which secured a 2–1 series victory for the Springboks.

== Gaelic football ==
Before becoming a professional rugby player, Murray played Gaelic football with Patrickswell and Limerick. He represented Limerick in the Sarsfield Cup and also played for Limerick in the primary football games.

== Statistics ==
=== International tries ===
Try	Opposing team	Location	Venue	Competition	Date	Result
1	New Zealand	Christchurch	Rugby League Park	2012 Ireland Tour	16 June 2012	Lost
2	New Zealand	Dublin	Aviva Stadium	2013 November Tests	24 November 2013	Lost
3	Italy	Rome	Stadio Olimpico	2015 Six Nations	7 February 2015	Won
4	France	Cardiff	Millennium Stadium	2015 Rugby World Cup	11 October 2015	Won
5	Wales	Dublin	Aviva Stadium	2016 Six Nations	7 February 2016	Drew
6	England	London	Twickenham Stadium	2016 Six Nations	27 February 2016	Lost
7	Scotland	Dublin	Aviva Stadium	2016 Six Nations	19 March 2016	Won
8	South Africa	Cape Town	Newlands Stadium	2016 Ireland Tour	11 June 2016	Won
9	New Zealand	Chicago	Soldier Field	2016 November Tests	5 November 2016	Won
10	France	Dublin	Aviva Stadium	2017 Six Nations	25 February 2017	Won
11	New Zealand	Wellington	Wellington Stadium	2017 British & Irish Lions Tour	1 July 2017	Won
12	Italy	Dublin	Aviva Stadium	2018 Six Nations	10 February 2018	Won
13	Scotland	Dublin	Aviva Stadium	2018 Six Nations	10 March 2018	Won
14	Scotland	Edinburgh	Murrayfield	2019 Six Nations	9 February 2019	Won
15	Italy	Rome	Stadio Olimpico	2019 Six Nations	24 February 2019	Won
16	Scotland	Dublin	Aviva Stadium	2022 Six Nations	19 March 2022	Won
17	Samoa	Bayonne	Stade Jean-Dauger	2023 RWC warm-up	26 August 2023	Won
18	South Africa	Pretoria	Loftus Versfeld	2024 Ireland rugby union tour of South Africa	6 July 2024	Lost
19	South Africa	Durban	Kings Park Stadium	2024 Ireland rugby union tour of South Africa	13 July 2024	Won

=== International analysis by opposition ===
Against	Played	Won	Lost	Drawn	Tries	Points	% Won
Argentina	5	4	1	0	0	0	80
Australia*	9	6	3	0	0	0	66.67
Canada	1	1	0	0	0	0	100
England	17	7	10	0	1	8	41.18
Fiji	1	1	0	0	0	0	100
France	15	8	5	2	2	10	53.33
Georgia	1	1	0	0	0	0	100
Italy	13	12	1	0	3	19	91.67
Japan*	3	2	1	0	0	0	66.67
New Zealand*	16	5	10	1	4	23	31.25
Romania	2	2	0	0	0	0	100
Samoa	3	3	0	0	1	5	100
Scotland	14	12	2	0	4	24	85.71
South Africa*	13	7	6	0	3	15	53.85
Tonga	1	1	0	0	0	0	100
United States	1	1	0	0	0	0	100
Wales	18	10	7	1	1	16	55.56
Total	133	83	45	4	19	120	62.41

Correct as of 15 March 2025 * indicates inclusion of caps for British & Irish Lions

== Honours ==
=== Munster ===
- United Rugby Championship:
  - Winner (2): 2010–11, 2022–23

=== Ireland ===
- Six Nations Championship:
  - Winner (5): 2014, 2015, 2018, 2023, 2024
- Grand Slam:
  - Winner (2): 2018, 2023
- Triple Crown:
  - Winner (4): 2018, 2022, 2023, 2025

=== British & Irish Lions ===
- British & Irish Lions tours:
  - Tourist (3): 2013, 2017, 2021

=== Individual ===
- Munster Rugby Player of the Year:
  - Winner (1): 2014
- Rugby Players Ireland Players' Player of the Year:
  - Winner (1): 2017
- Midi Olympique World Player of the Year:
  - Winner (1): 2018
- World Rugby Men's 15s Team of the Decade:
  - Winner (1): 2010–2019
