= Bill Johnston (rugby union, born 1997) =

Irish rugby union player (born 1997)

- Born: 17 February 1997 (age 29) Clonmel, Ireland
- Height: 1.80 m (5 ft 11 in)
- Weight: 87 kg (13.7 st; 192 lb)
- School: Rockwell College
- University: University of Limerick
- Notable relative: David Johnston (brother)

Rugby union career
- Position: Fly-half
Amateur team(s)
Years	Team	Apps	(Points)
2015–2021	Garryowen		
Senior career
Years	Team	Apps	(Points)
2017–2019	Munster	12	(29)
2019–2021	Ulster	18	(58)
2021	→ Ealing (loan)	2	(19)
2021–2022	Ealing	0	(0)
2022–	Richmond	6	(22)
- Correct as of 29 October 2022
International career
Years	Team	Apps	(Points)
2016–2017	Ireland U20	5	(50)
- Correct as of 18 March 2017

Bill Johnston (born 17 February 1997) is an Irish rugby union player for English RFU Championship club Richmond. He plays as a fly-half and previously represented his native province of Munster, their provincial rivals Ulster, English club Ealing and, in the amateur All-Ireland League, Limerick club Garryowen.

== Early life ==
Born in Clonmel, County Tipperary, Johnston first began playing rugby aged 6 with Clonmel. He won the 2015 Munster Schools Rugby Senior Cup with Rockwell College, leading the side from fly-half in their 23–13 victory against Ardscoil Rís.

== Professional career ==
=== Munster ===
Johnston joined the Munster Academy in November 2015. On 13 November 2015, Johnston made his debut for Munster A, starting for the side alongside his brother, David, in their 27–25 defeat at the hands of London Scottish in their 2015–16 British and Irish Cup pool opener and scoring a penalty on his debut.

He scored 8 points, all from conversions, in Munster A's 28–8 victory against Ospreys Premiership Select in Round 3 of the tournament on 11 December 2015. 9 days later, Johnston scored 16 points off the tee as Munster A again beat Ospreys Premiership Select, this time 46–26 away from home in Brewery Field. On 10 December 2016, Johnston scored 10 points, all from the tee, as Munster A beat Rotherham Titans 35–24 away from home in Clifton Lane in Round 3 of the 2016–17 British and Irish Cup. In December 2016, Johnston was ruled out for 8–12 weeks with an ankle injury.

Johnston made his competitive senior debut for Munster when he came off the bench as a replacement for Tyler Bleyendaal in the 50–14 away win against Zebre in a 2016–17 Pro12 fixture in the Stadio Sergio Lanfranchi, Parma on 25 March 2017. Johnston had been a late call-up to the Munster bench after his older brother, David, replaced the injured Andrew Conway in the starting line-up. On 31 March 2017, Johnston started for Munster A in their 2016–17 British and Irish Cup semi-final against Ealing Trailfinders. Munster A won the game 25–9, but Johnston went off injured during the first half and it was later confirmed that he had fractured his fibula.

Johnston was promoted to the senior Munster squad ahead of the 2017–18 season. He signed a two-year contract with Munster in April 2018. In his first Pro14 start for Munster, made during round 8 of the 2018–19 season against South African side Cheetahs on 4 November 2018, Johnston scored two conversions and one penalty in his sides 30–26 away victory.

=== Ulster ===
Johnston joined Munster's provincial rivals Ulster ahead of the 2019–20 season. He made his debut for the province in their 63–26 defeat away to South African side Cheetahs in round 2 of the 2019–20 Pro14 on 5 October 2019.

=== Ealing ===
Johnston joined English RFU Championship club Ealing Trailfinders on loan in April 2021, where his older brother David is also a player. The move was made permanent ahead of the 2021–22 season.

=== Richmond ===
Johnston moved south to join another London-based RFU Championship club, Richmond, ahead of the 2022–23 season.

== Ireland ==
Johnston was selected in the Ireland U20 squad for the 2016 World Rugby Under 20 Championship when it was announced in May 2016. This was his first call-up to the Under-20s team, having previously represented Ireland at U18 level. On 7 June 2016, Johnston made his debut for the side when he started in Ireland's opening pool fixture against Wales U20, scoring 11 points in his sides comeback 26–25 victory, having one point trailed the Welsh by 17 points.

He again started on 11 June, this time against New Zealand U20. He contributed 10 points in Ireland's historic 33–24 win against New Zealand U20, the sides first against their U20 rivals, but had to leave the field with a dislocated shoulder late in the first-half. Subsequently, the injury ruled him out for the rest of the tournament. On 24 February 2017, Johnston made his first appearance in the 2017 Six Nations Under 20 Championship, replacing the injured Jonny McPhillips and starting against France U20. Johnston scored 12 points in his sides 27–22 victory in Donnybrook Stadium. On 11 March 2017, Johnston again started for Ireland U20, this time against Wales U20 at the Eirias Stadium. Johnston scored 12 points off the tee for his side, including 3 conversions, but it was not enough to prevent Wales winning 41–27. On 17 March 2017, Johnston started and scored 5 points from the tee in Ireland U20's 14–10 defeat against England U20.
