= David Johnston (rugby union, born 1994) =

Irish rugby union player

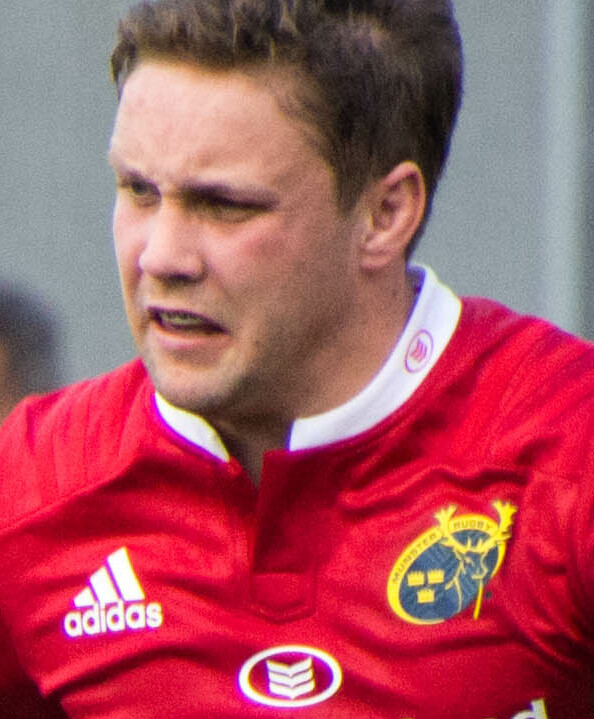
- Born: 28 February 1994 (age 32) Clonmel, Ireland
- Height: 1.80 m (5 ft 11 in)
- Weight: 90 kg (14 st; 200 lb)
- School: Rockwell College
- Notable relative: Bill Johnston (brother)

Rugby union career
- Position(s): Fullback, Centre, Fly-half
Amateur team(s)
Years	Team	Apps	(Points)
20??–2018	UL Bohemians		
Senior career
Years	Team	Apps	(Points)
2015–2018	Munster	10	(0)
2018–	Ealing	37	(66)
- Correct as of 20 June 2021

David Johnston (born 28 February 1994) is an Irish rugby union player, currently playing for English side Ealing Trailfinders in the RFU Championship. He plays primarily as a fullback, but can also play at fly-half or centre.

== Munster ==
Johnston made his debut for Munster on 5 September 2015, starting in the opening game of the 2015–16 Pro12 against Benetton. In January 2016, it was announced that Johnston had signed a contract with Munster that will see him join the senior squad from the 2016–17 season, firstly on a development contract and then, from 2017–18, on a full contract. Johnston was nominated for the 2016 Munster Academy Player of the Year Award.

== Ealing Trailfinders ==
English RFU Championship side Ealing Trailfinders announced that Johnston would be joining them on a one-year contract for the 2018–19 season in April 2018. Johnston made 16 appearances for Ealing in his first season with the club, scoring 5 tries.
