= Neil Cronin =

Irish rugby union player

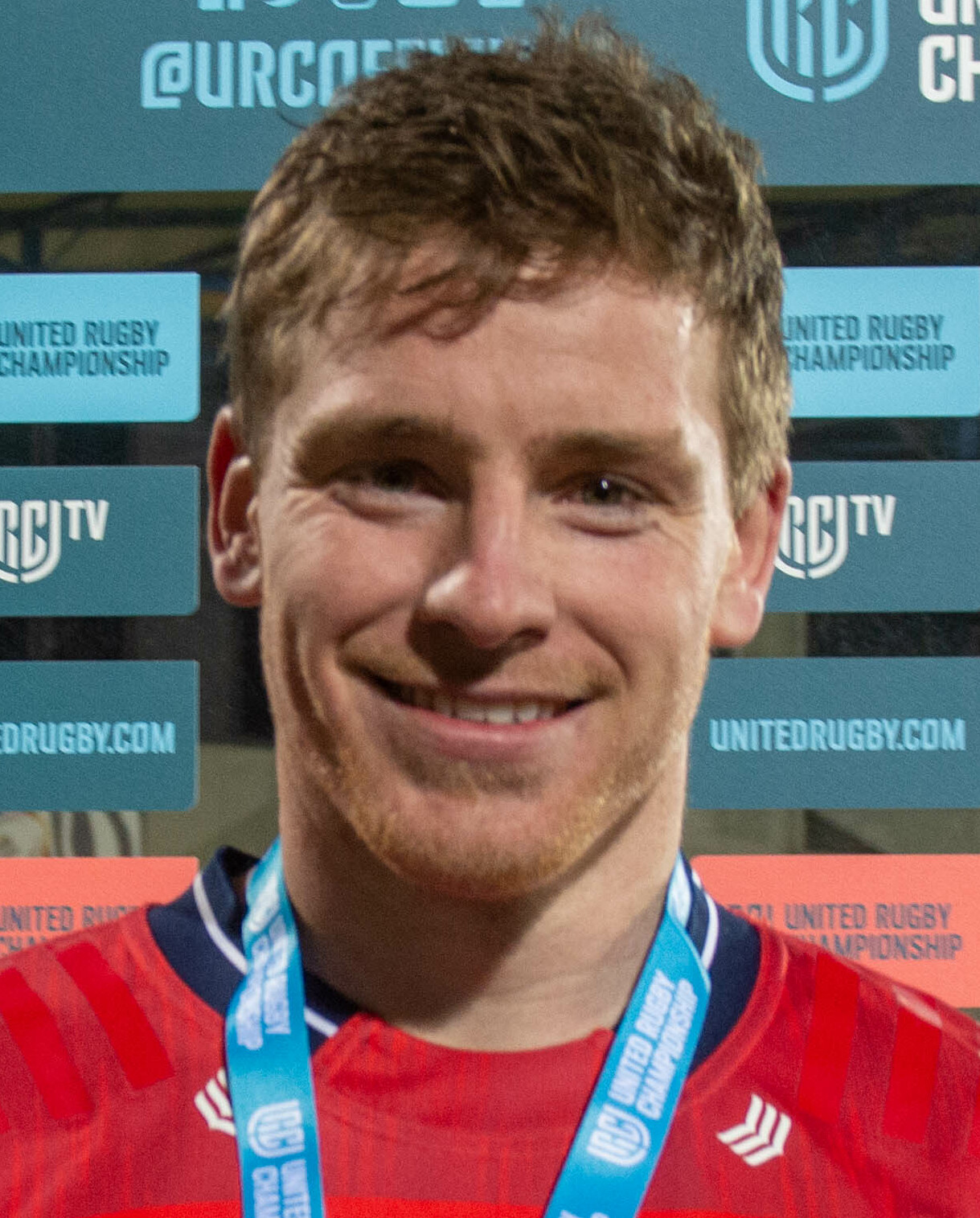
- Born: 6 December 1992 (age 33) Limerick, Ireland
- Height: 1.73 m (5 ft 8 in)
- Weight: 83 kg (13.1 st; 183 lb)
- School: Castletroy College
- University: University of Limerick
- Notable relative: Seán Cronin (brother)

Rugby union career
- Position: Scrum-half
Amateur team(s)
Years	Team	Apps	(Points)
2011–	Garryowen		
Senior career
Years	Team	Apps	(Points)
2014–	Munster	40	(15)
- Correct as of 23 February 2024
International career
Years	Team	Apps	(Points)
2014–2018	Ireland Club XV	8	(8)
- Correct as of 18 March 2018

Neil Cronin (born 6 December 1992) is an Irish rugby union player who plays as a scrum-half for United Rugby Championship club Munster.

== Garryowen ==
During the 2017–18 season, Cronin captained Garryowen to a 39th Munster Senior Challenge Cup and, for his efforts, was named the AIL Munster Player of the Year and Division 1A Player of the Year.

== Munster ==
Cronin made his Munster debut on 26 December 2014, featuring off the bench in the provinces 28–13 win against Leinster in Thomond Park. He went on to make three more appearances as a substitute for Munster during the 2014–15 season. Following his performances for Garryowen, Cronin was awarded a one-year contract with Munster for the 2018–19 season.

Cronin made his 'second' debut for Munster on 1 September 2018, starting at scrum-half in their opening 2018–19 Pro14 fixture against South African side Cheetahs in Thomond Park. Cronin made his Champions Cup debut on 13 October 2018, featuring off the bench in Munster's opening 2018–19 pool 2 fixture against English side Exeter Chiefs, which ended in a 10–10 draw in Sandy Park.

Cronin signed a two-year contract extension with Munster in October 2018. Cronin scored his first try for Munster in their 43–0 win against South African side Southern Kings on 15 February 2019. He suffered an ACL injury during training with Munster in October 2020, which is expected to rule Cronin out for at least six months. He signed a two-year contract extension with Munster in March 2021, a deal that will see him remain with the province until at least June 2023. Cronin featured off the bench in Munster's historic 28–14 win against a South Africa XV in Páirc Uí Chaoimh on 10 November 2022, and extended his contract with Munster until the end of January 2024.

== Ireland ==
Cronin has made eight appearances for the Ireland Club XV, most recently in February and March 2018 when he captained the side in two fixtures against Scotland Club XV.

== Life outside rugby ==
After Cronin's first brief stint with Munster came to an end, he qualified as a secondary school teacher, before going on to earn a teaching degree and a position at St Munchin's College.

== Honours ==
=== Munster ===
- United Rugby Championship
  - Winner (1): 2022–23
