= Seán Cronin (rugby union) =

Irish rugby union player

- Born: Seán M. Cronin; 6 May 1986 (age 40) Limerick, Ireland
- Height: 1.78 m (5 ft 10 in)
- Weight: 103 kg (16.2 st; 227 lb)
- School: Ardscoil Rís
- University: University of Limerick; Griffith College Dublin
- Notable relative: Neil Cronin (brother)

Rugby union career
- Position: Hooker
Amateur team(s)
Years	Team	Apps	(Points)
- Shannon
- St Mary's
Senior career
Years	Team	Apps	(Points)
2005–2008	Munster	2	(0)
2008–2011	Connacht	62	(40)
2011–2022	Leinster	206	(225)
- Correct as of 21 May 2022
International career
Years	Team	Apps	(Points)
2005–2006	Ireland U21	4	(5)
2007–2010	Ireland Wolfhounds	11	(5)
2009–2019	Ireland	72	(30)
- Correct as of 5 April 2020

Seán Cronin (born 6 May 1986) is a former Irish rugby union player who played as a hooker for Leinster in the United Rugby Championship. He also played for the Ireland national rugby union team.

== Youth ==
Cronin was educated at Ardscoil Rís in Limerick. He previously played with Shannon and Munster Rugby, where he had progressed through their academy to a development contract. Cronin's rugby career began to take off while playing in the All-Ireland League for Shannon.

Before becoming a professional rugby player, Cronin played minor Gaelic football with Limerick in 2004. He also won a Limerick Senior Football Championship medal with Monaleen in 2005.

== Professional ==
Outings for Ireland A and two Celtic League appearances for his home province of Munster saw Cronin attract the attention of Connacht who offered him a full contract in the summer of 2008. In January 2011 it was announced that Cronin would join Leinster on a 2-year contract for the 2011–12 season, after 3 seasons at Connacht. Cronin retired at the end of the 2021–22 season.

== Ireland ==
Cronin represented Ireland in rugby at Ireland Schools, U19, U21, and A (Ireland Wolfhounds) levels. Cronin earned his first cap against Fiji in November 2009. His second cap came as a replacement for Rory Best during the Ireland v Wales Six Nations game in March 2010. He won his first start against New Zealand in the 2010 summer tests and also started against Australia.

On 10 March 2018 Cronin scored a try in Ireland's 28–8 win over Scotland. The win clinched the 2018 Six Nations title for Ireland. While a mainstay of the Irish team for several years, Cronin started in only 10 of his 72 tests for Ireland. He made his first 6 Nations start in 2019 against Italy, his 32 previous 6 Nations appearances having come as a substitute.
