= Darren Sweetnam =

Irish rugby union player

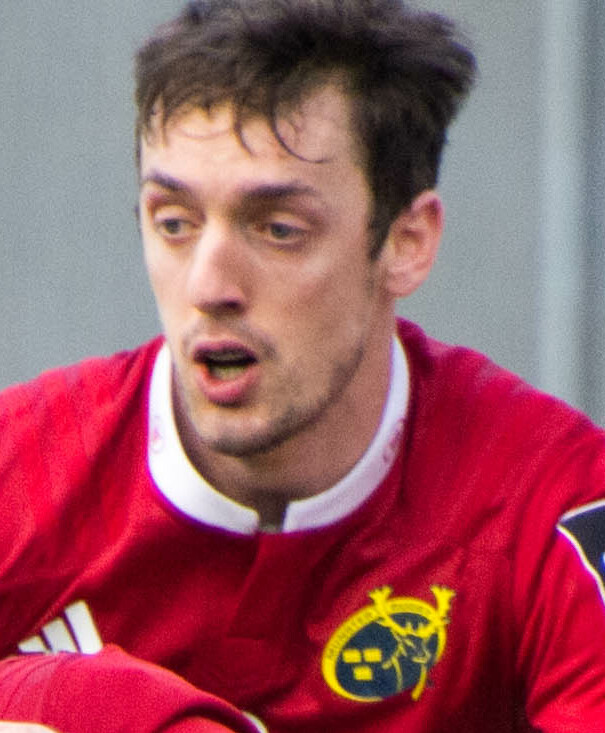
- Born: 5 May 1993 (age 33) Dunmanway, County Cork, Ireland
- Height: 1.85 m (6 ft 1 in)
- Weight: 93 kg (14.6 st; 205 lb)
- School: Bandon Grammar School
- University: University College Cork

Rugby union career
- Position(s): Wing, Fullback
Amateur team(s)
Years	Team	Apps	(Points)
- Bandon
- Dolphin
- Cork Constitution
Senior career
Years	Team	Apps	(Points)
2015–2021	Munster	92	(110)
2021	La Rochelle	6	(10)
2021–	Oyonnax	34	(40)
- Correct as of 26 January 2023
International career
Years	Team	Apps	(Points)
2013	Ireland U20	6	(10)
2017	Ireland	3	(5)
- Correct as of 24 November 2017
- Gaelic games career
- Native name: Darrin Suatnam (Irish)
- Born: 5 May 1993 (age 33) Dunmanway, County Cork, Ireland
- Sport: Hurling
- Position: Midfield
Club
- Years: Club
- 2010–2012: Dohenys
Club titles
- Cork titles: 0
Inter-county*
Years	County	Apps (scores)
2012	Cork	4 (0–1)
Inter-county titles
- Munster titles: 0
- All-Irelands: 0
- NHL: 0
- All Stars: 0
- *Inter County team apps and scores correct as of 16:57, 31 July 2012.

Darren Sweetnam (born 5 May 1993) is an Irish rugby union player for French Pro D2 club Oyonnax. He plays as a wing but can also play fullback. Sweetnam is also a former inter-county hurler with Cork and has played underage hockey for Ireland.

== Rugby ==
=== Munster ===
On 1 October 2012, it was announced that Sweetman had signed a deal to join the Munster Rugby academy on a three-year contract. He had previously represented the province at Schools, U18, U19 and U20 levels. Sweetnam made his debut for Munster A on 18 January 2013.

In January 2015, Sweetnam signed a two-year contract with Munster. Sweetnam made his senior Munster debut on 14 February 2015, coming off the bench in the game against Cardiff Blues. He was nominated for the 2015 John McCarthy Award for Academy Player of the Year Award in April 2015.

On 1 October 2016, Sweetnam scored a try and won the Man-of-the-Match award in Munster's 49–5 win against Zebre in a 2016–17 Pro12 fixture. On 22 October 2016, Sweetnam started in Munster's 38–17 win against Glasgow Warriors in Round 2 of the 2016–17 European Rugby Champions Cup, a match that was his European debut for the province. Sweetnam was ruled out for 6 weeks with a knee injury sustained in the fixture against Leinster on 26 December 2016.

On 24 January 2017, it was announced that Sweetnam had signed a contract extension. On 10 February 2017, Sweetnam returned from injury when he started against Dragons, playing 55 minutes before being replaced by Francis Saili. On 1 April 2017, Sweetnam scored a try in Munster's 41–16 Champions Cup quarter-final win against Toulouse. On 4 May 2017, Sweetnam won the 2016–17 Munster Rugby Young Player of the Year award.

Sweetnam was named Man-of-the-Match in Munster's 2018–19 Pro14 opening win against South African side Cheetahs on 1 September 2018, scoring one try in the provinces 38–0 victory. He signed a two-year contract extension with Munster in December 2018, but was granted an early release from his contract in March 2021.

=== La Rochelle ===
Sweetnam joined French Top 14 club La Rochelle, where former Munster player Ronan O'Gara is head coach, as a medical joker on a three-month deal to provide backs cover after an injury to Jérémy Sinzelle in March 2021. He made his debut for the club in their 38–23 win against Lyon on 17 April 2021, coming on as a replacement for fullback Brice Dulin in the 60th minute.

=== Oyonnax ===
Sweetnam was not kept on by La Rochelle, but joined another French club, Pro D2 side Oyonnax, ahead of the 2021–22 season.

=== Ireland ===
Sweetnam was named in the Ireland Under-20 team for their 2013 Under-20 Six Nations Championship opener against Wales on 1 February 2013 and made his debut as a replacement during the game. He was named in the Ireland Under-20 squad for the 2013 IRB Junior World Championship. He scored two tries in Ireland Under-20s 46–3 victory against Fiji Under-20s on 9 June 2013. Sweetnam started for Ireland Under-20s in their 5th–6th place play-off against hosts France Under-20s on 18 June 2013, a game which the French team won 9–8.

On 7 November 2016, Sweetnam was added to the senior Ireland squad for the 2016 end-of-year rugby union internationals. Sweetnam earned his second senior international call-up in October 2017, being named in the Ireland squad for the 2017 Autumn Internationals. He made his debut for Ireland on 11 November 2017, coming on as a replacement for Rob Kearney in the 38–3 win against South Africa. A week later, Sweetnam made his first start for Ireland, doing so against Fiji and scoring his first try for Ireland in their 23–20 win.

== Hurling ==
Previously he played hurling as a midfielder for the Cork senior team. Sweetnam made his first appearance for the team during the 2012 Waterford Crystal Cup and was subsequently included in Cork's league and championship teams. At club level Sweetnam played for Dohenys. His choice of professional rugby ends his hurling career for the foreseeable future.
