= Johann van Graan =

South African rugby union coach

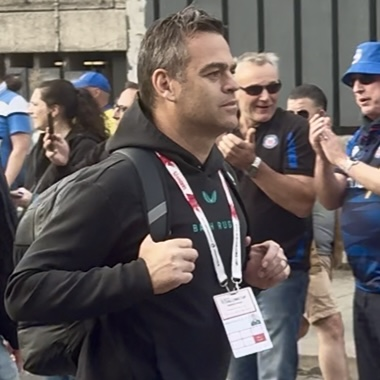
- Van Graan in 2025
- Born: Johann Christoffel van Graan; 18 March 1980 (age 46)
- School: Afrikaanse Hoër Seunskool, Pretoria
- University: University of Pretoria

Rugby union career
Coaching career
- Years: Team
- 2003-2007: Blue Bulls (Technical Advisor)
- 2005-2007: Bulls (Technical Advisor)
- 2007-2011: Blue Bulls (Assistant Coach)
- 2007-2011: Bulls (Forwards Coach)
- 2012–2017: South Africa (Forwards coach)
- 2017–2022: Munster (Head coach)
- 2022–: Bath (Head coach)

Johann Christoffel van Graan (born 18 March 1980) is a South African rugby union coach, currently the head coach for Bath.

== Coaching career ==
Although Van Graan did not have a top level playing career, he had a family background in rugby and showed a strong interest in analysis from an early age.

=== 2003–2011 : Bulls and Blue Bulls ===
Van Graan began working with the Bulls as young as 16, though his involvement wasn’t formalised until 2003. He started as a technical adviser for the Blue Bulls rugby team, initially working with their Vodacom Cup team, before moving into the same role with their Currie Cup team and the Bulls Super Rugby (then known as Super 14) team. Given his father’s high position in Blue Bulls Rugby Union, Johann’s involvement with the Bulls drew allegations of nepotism. However, their head coach at the time, Heyneke Meyer, has refuted these claims, asserting, “His father didn’t appoint him; there was never pressure on me. I appointed him.” He moved into a role as the teams' forwards and attack coach, helping the Bulls win three Super 14 titles in 2007 (under head coach Heyneke Meyer) and 2009 and 2010 (under Frans Ludeke).

=== 2012–2017 : South Africa ===
He joined the Springboks coaching setup in 2012 as a technical adviser, where he again linked up with Heyneke Meyer. He became known for his attention to detail, utilising video analysis, and soon saw his role progressed to that of forwards coach. In the coaching restructure post-2015 Rugby World Cup, Van Graan was the only member of the coaching team to survive, and he continued in his role under new Springboks head coach Allister Coetzee. In May 2016, he was reportedly set to become the interim head coach of Bath Rugby following the dismissal of Mike Ford as director of rugby. However, this appointment ultimately did not materialise.

=== 2017–2022 : Munster ===
In October 2017, it was confirmed that Van Graan would be leaving South Africa to join Irish Pro14 side Munster as their new head coach. He replaced outgoing Director of Rugby Rassie Erasmus, who was returning to South Africa. His first game with Munster was a 36–19 win away to Zebre in the Pro14 on 26 November 2017, although he officially took charge of the side the day after. He signed a two-year contract extension with Munster and the IRFU in April 2019. Van Graan left Munster upon the conclusion of the 2021–22 season. Van Graan’s Munster legacy is debated. While he took them to five semi-finals and a final, he never won a trophy. Some critics perceived his style as overly conservative and labelled him as a “pen-pusher.” However, figures such as Simon Zebo have defended his record, describing Van Graan as a “master tactician,” while also suggesting that internal challenges, including the lack of support and undermining from certain figures behind the scenes, negatively impacted the team’s results.

=== 2022–present : Bath ===
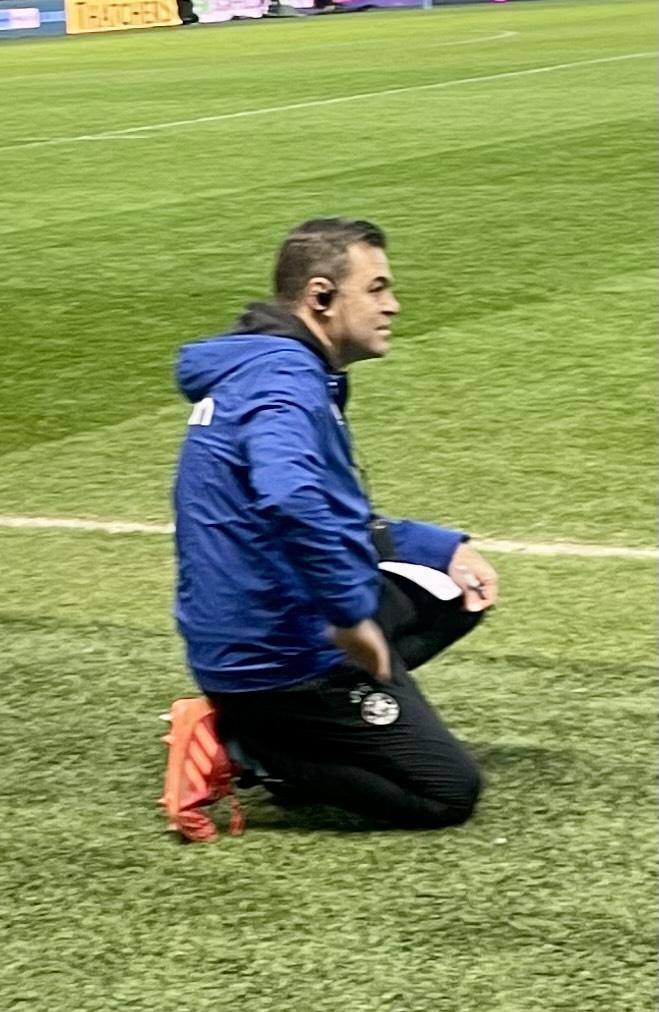
Van Grann observing Bristol versus Bath match at Ashton Gate, 2024

Van Graan joined English Premiership club Bath on a long-term contract for the 2022–23 season. He was appointed as head coach under Stuart Hooper, Director of Rugby since 2019, and replacing Neal Hatley who was transitioning to Forwards Coach. However, after Bath's historic 64-0 loss to rivals Gloucester Rugby near the end of the 2021–22 season, a restructuring of the club's leadership took place. Hooper was moved from Director of Rugby to the newly created role of General Manager, with Van Graan becoming Head of Rugby and gaining full control for the 2022–23 season.

Van Graan described Bath as being “broken as a club” when he arrived, and admitted that he “didn’t realise the demons we were carrying” in the early months of his tenure. However, after taking over following one of the most challenging seasons in the club’s history, he successfully transformed the team. The team's improvement in form over the course of the campaign culminated with a four match winning streak at seasons end. A 61-29 thrashing of Saracens on the final day saw them edge neighbours and rivals Bristol Bears for eighth in the table and a place in the 2023-24 Champions Cup.

In his second season in charge, Bath's improvement continued. In Europe, Bath reached the knockout stages of the Champions Cup for the first time since 2015, advancing to the Round of 16. With Bath sitting third in the Premiership with just two games remaining in the regular season, Van Graan signed a new six-year contract with the club, committing his long-term future until the end of the 2029-30 campaign. Bath finished the regular season in 2nd place, their highest finish since 2015. After defeating Sale Sharks in the semi-final, his side were defeated by Northampton Saints in the 2023-2024 Premiership Final by a score of 25-21.

In December 2024, he guided Bath to 68–10 demolition of Saracens, inflicting them with their worst defeat in Premiership history. In March 2025, his side ended a 17 year trophy drought by beating Exeter Chiefs 48-14 at Sandy Park in the Premiership Rugby Cup final. This was Bath's first domestic trophy win since 1996. On April 26, after defeating Newcastle Falcons 55-19, Bath guaranteed a top-spot finish in the 2024–25 Premiership season with three games left to go. This was the first time Bath finished top of the table in the regular season since 2003-04. After a disappointing Champions Cup campaign, in which they finished fifth out of six in their pool, Bath qualified for an away Round of 16 fixture in the Challenge Cup. They defeated Pau away from home, then beat Gloucester at home in the quarter-final and Edinburgh away in the semi-final. Bath defeated Lyon 37–12 in the final to win the Challenge Cup for the second time in their history. In June 2025, his Bath team defeated Bristol Bears 34-20 at home to advance to the Premiership final for the second year in a row. In the final, Bath defeated Leicester Tigers 23–21 to claim their first league title in 29 years. This was the third leg of a historic treble, having already won the Premiership Cup and the European Rugby Challenge Cup that season. Van Graan became just the third head coach to win the Premiership with Bath, after Jack Rowell and Brian Ashton.

== Personal life ==
He is the son of Barend van Graan, who was the long-serving CEO of the Blue Bulls Rugby Union until January 2019.
