= Swart =

Swart is an Afrikaans, Dutch and German surname meaning "black" (spelled zwart in modern Dutch). Variations on it are de Swart, Swarte, de Swarte, de Swardt, Swarts, Zwart, de Zwart, and Zwarts. People with this surname include:

== Swart ==
- Alfred L. Swart (1840–?), Wisconsin politician
- Alida Swart (born 1975), member of British pop group Vanilla (band)
- Amanda Swart, South African biochemist
- Balie Swart (born 1964), South African rugby player
- Bonje Swart (born 1949), Dutch singer
- Carla Swart (1987–2011), South African road racing cyclist
- Charles Robberts Swart (1894–1982), first president of the Republic of South Africa
- Claudius Claussoen Swart (1388–14??), Danish geographer
- Clinton Swart (born 1992), South African rugby player
- Colla Swart (1930–2023), South African photographer
- Daryl Swart, South African drummer of Tree63 (band)
- Ed Swart (born 1937), Dutch racing car driver
- Haring Johannes Swart (1922–20??), botanist with the standard author abbreviation H.J.Swart
- Henda Swart (1939–2016), South African mathematician
- HP Swart (born 1989), South African rugby player
- Jack Swart (born 1954), New Zealand road racing cyclist
- Jacobus Swart, Brazilian engineer
- Jan Swart van Groningen (1495–1563), Dutch Renaissance painter
- Joan Swart (born 1965), South African psychologist
- K. W. Swart (1916–1992), Dutch historian
- Kaylin Swart, South African Goalkeeper
- Karin Swart, South African cricketer
- Lammert Swart (1847–1909), Dutch general of the Royal Netherlands East Indies Army
- Malherbe Swart (born 1991), South African rugby player
- Mel Swart (1919–2007), Canadian politician
- Michael Swart (born 1982), Dutch cricketer
- Peter Swart (1752–1829), New York state court judge
- Peter Swart (1946–2000), Zimbabwean cricketer
- Riekje Swart (1923–2008), Dutch gallery owner
- Sjaak Swart (born 1938), Dutch footballer
- Stephanus Swart (1890–1927), South African farmer and spree killer
- Stephen Swart (born 1965), New Zealand road racing cyclist
- Steven Swart, South African politician
- Valiant Swart (born 1965), South African Afrikaans rock/folk singer
- William D. Swart (1856–1936), American merchant, manufacturer and politician

== De Swart ==
- Henriette de Swart (born 1961), Dutch linguist
- Saar de Swart (1861–1951), Dutch sculptor

== Swarte ==
- Joost Swarte (born 1947), Dutch cartoonist and graphic designer
- Martinus Swarte (1813–1835), Dutch colonial administrator

== De Swarte ==
- Michelle de Swarte (born 1980), British model
- Théotime Langlois de Swarte (born 1995), French violinist
- Vincent de Swarte (1963–2006), French novelist

== Swarts ==
- André Swarts (born 1995), South African rugby union player
- Bernice Swarts (born 1972), South African politician
- David Swarts, New York politician
- Frédéric Swarts (1866–1940), Belgian chemist
- Helga Maria Swarts, birth name of Moa Martinson, Swedish writer
- Hilary Swarts, French wildlife biologist
- Kayla Swarts, South African field hockey and sevens player
- Leighton Swarts, South African cricketer
- Leland Swarts Devore, American college football player and military officer

== See also ==
- Swart, Missouri, a community in the United States
- Swart River in South Africa
