= De Zwart =

de Zwart is a Dutch surname, meaning "the black (one)", usually having referred to dark hair. Variant forms include De Swart, De Swarte and De Zwarte. People with these names include:

De Zwart

- Erik de Zwart (born 1957), Dutch media entrepreneur
- Martijn de Zwart (born 1990), Dutch footballer
- Pieter de Zwart (born 1944), Dutch Olympic sailor
- Willem de Zwart (1862–1931), Dutch painter, engraver, and watercolorist

De Swart

- Henriette de Swart (born 1961), Dutch linguist

De Swarte

- Michelle de Swarte (born 1980), English model and TV presenter
- Vincent de Swarte (1963–2006), French novelist

De Zwarte

- Piet de Zwarte (born 1990), Dutch water polo player

Deswarte

- Hilda Deswarte (fl. 1928), Belgian fencer
- Sylvie Deswarte-Rosa (born 1945), Portuguese art historian

== See also ==
- Zwart, Dutch surname
