= Luís of Portugal, Duke of Beja =

Duke of Beja (1506–1555)

Luís of Portugal
- Duke of Beja
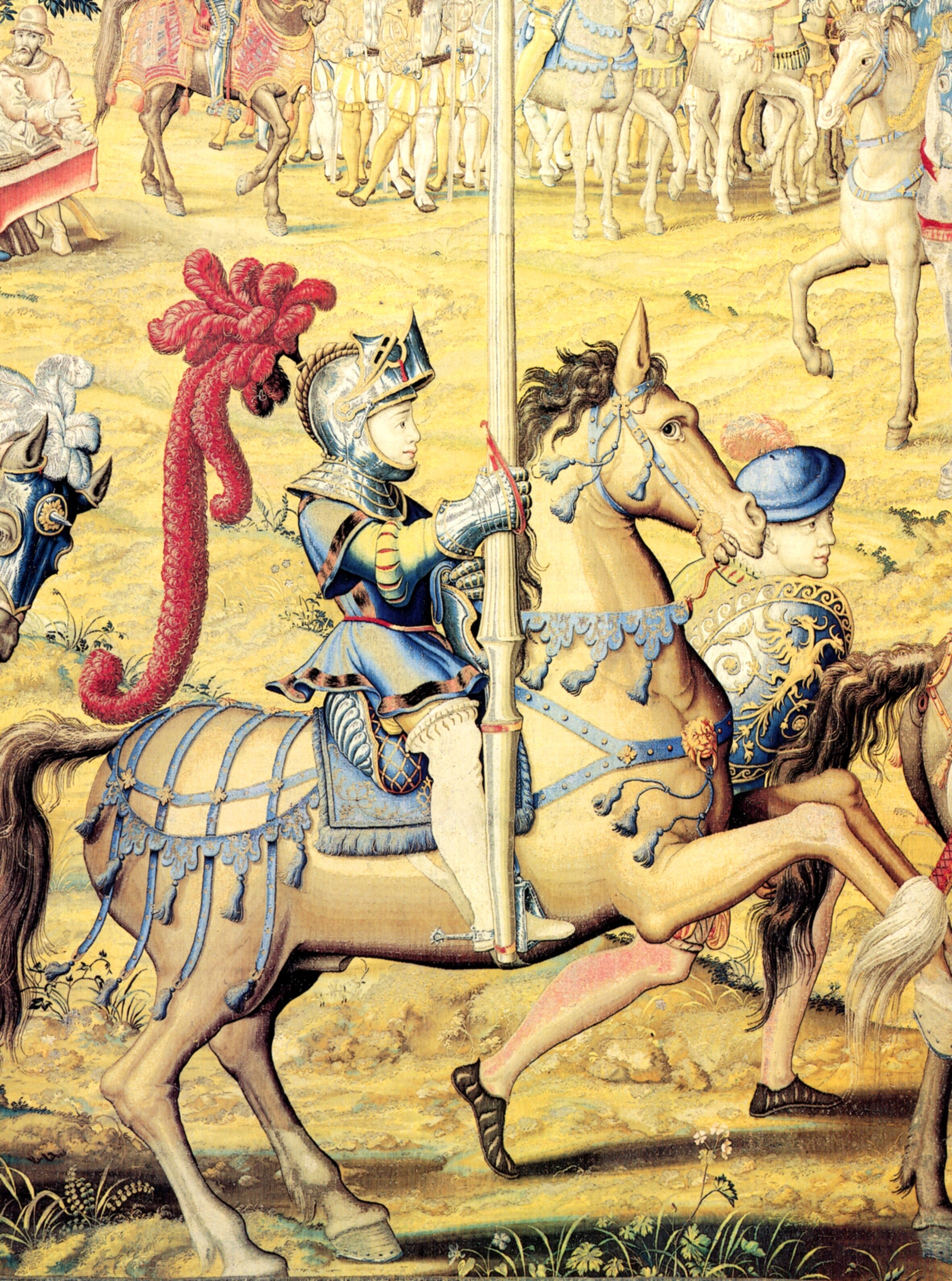
- Infante Luís in the Conquest of Tunis by Pieter Coecke van Aelst; c. 1535–1550
- Born: 3 March 1506; Abrantes, Kingdom of Portugal
- Died: 27 November 1555 (aged 49); Marvila, Lisbon, Kingdom of Portugal
- Issue: António, Prior of Crato
- House: Aviz
- Father: Manuel I of Portugal
- Mother: Maria of Aragon

Infante Luís of Portugal, Duke of Beja (3 March 1506 – 27 November 1555) was the second son of King Manuel I of Portugal and his second wife, Maria of Aragon. He participated in the Conquest of Tunis.

== Early life ==
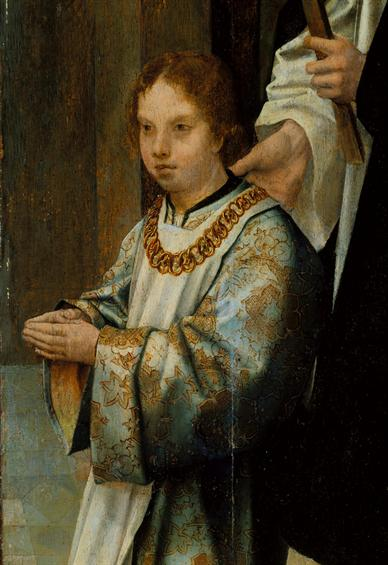
Luís in the Triptych of the Infantes; by the Master of Lourinhã, 1516

Born in Abrantes on 3 March 1506, Luís was the fourth child of Manuel I and Maria of Aragon. His godparents were his aunt Isabel of Viseu, and his cousins Jaime, Duke of Braganza, and João de Almeida, 2nd Count of Abrantes.

Luís displayed exceptional intelligence and enthusiasm for learning from a young age. Under the guidance of Pedro Nunes, (Note: The timeframe during which Luís was taught by Nunez is uncertain, but some sources speculate that the lessons took place between 1526 and 1531.) he excelled in philosophy, mathematics, and astronomy. He was educated alongside João de Castro and the two became lifelong intimate friends. Luís's amiable nature earned him both admiration among the nobility and widespread popularity among the people, standing out as an educated, affable, and jovial prince in stark contrast to his more somber older brother, John III.

== Duke of Beja ==
Luís was granted the title of Duke of Beja on 5 August 1527, as well as possession of several parishes and municipalities that spanned Beira and Alentejo. He also held the titles of Constable of the Kingdom (Portuguese: Condestável do Reino) and Prior of the Order of Saint John of Jerusalem, with its Portuguese headquarters in the town of Crato. Previously reliant on the crown, Luís's newfound territorial holdings afforded him a measure of economic autonomy. His estates expanded following the death of the Countess of Marialva in 1537, (Note: Luís's brother, Infante Ferdinand, was married to the daughter of the Countess. Following the passing of Ferdinand and his wife in 1534 without any surviving issue, the Countess bequeathed her entire estate to Luís.) making his household the most extensive in Portugal, in terms of revenues and dependents, second only to John III's.

=== Conquest of Tunis ===
In the Conquest of Tunis (1535), Luís fought at the side of his brother-in-law Charles V. Charles specifically requested the Portuguese galleon São João Baptista, also known as Botafogo, which was the most powerful ship in the world at the time, boasting 366 bronze cannons. Luís played a crucial role in the campaign by orchestrating a strategic maneuver with the Botafogo spur ram that successfully broke the defensive chains at La Goletta, allowing the Christian allied fleet to access and conquer Tunis. His actions gained him international eminence.

=== Patronage ===
Luís, a poet himself, was a prominent supporter of the arts and literature, recognized for his patronage of intellectuals and a particular affection for poetry and theater. In later life, the Infante dedicated himself to religious matters. In addition to acting as a patron for the Jesuits, he founded several convents and monasteries. In 1542, after receiving Salvaterra de Magos from his brother, Luís constructed a palace with sumptuous gardens.

=== Family ===
Despite his grave concerns about the longevity of the House of Aviz, (Note: In 1540, a series of premature deaths resulted in Infante Henry (who was bound by ecclesiastical vows), Luís, and the ailing Crown Prince João emerging as the sole male-line relatives preceding foreign princes in the line of succession to the Portuguese throne.) Luís never married. For years there were efforts to arrange his marriage with Henry VIII and Catherine of Aragon's daughter Mary, the future Mary I of England, but the princess instead married Philip II. Other suggested brides included Christina of Denmark, Hedwig Jagiellon, and his niece Maria Manuela of Portugal.

Luís had a natural son by Violante Gomes, nicknamed Pelicana, a New Christian. Their son António, Prior of Crato, would be one of the claimants to the throne after the death of King Sebastian of Portugal in the disastrous Battle of Alcácer Quibir and the subsequent dynastic crisis that followed, and, according to some historians, the last King of Portugal before the Iberian Union.

== Death ==
In November 1555, Luís fell seriously ill in Salvaterra and was brought to court. He died within a few days, on 27 November 1555, and was buried in the Convent of Belém next to his brother, Infante Afonso.

== Ancestry ==
Ancestors of Luís of Portugal, Duke of Beja

8. Edward I of Portugal
4. Ferdinand, Duke of Viseu
9. Eleanor of Aragon
2. Manuel I of Portugal
10. John, Constable of Portugal
5. Beatrice of Portugal
11. Isabel of Barcelos
1. Louis, Duke of Beja
12. John II of Aragon
6. Ferdinand II of Aragon
13. Juana Enríquez
3. Maria of Aragon
14. John II of Castile
7. Isabella I of Castile
15. Isabella of Portugal

== See also ==
- Duke of Beja
- Conquest of Tunis (1535)
- Botafogo (galleon)
- João de Sá Panasco
- Descendants of Manuel I of Portugal

== Bibliography ==
- Carvalhal, Hélder (2013). "A Casa Senhorial do Infante D. Luís e a Casa Real: Autonomia Parcial ou Subordinação Total?". In Serrano, Eliseo (ed.). De la tierra al cielo. Líneas recientes de investigación en Historia Moderna ["From Earth to Heaven. Recent Lines of Research in Modern History] (PDF) (in Portuguese). Zaragoza: Institución Fernando el Católico. pp. 535–542. ISBN 978-84-9911-234-3.
- Deswarte-Rosa, Sylvie (1991). Espoirs et désespoir de l'infant D. Luís (in French). pp. 241–298.
- McMurdo, Edward (1889). The history of Portugal, from the Commencement of the Monarchy to the Reign of Alfonso III. London: Sampson Low, Marston, Searle, & Rivington.
- Pereira, Esteves; Rodrigues, Guilherme (1904). Portugal: diccionario historico, chorographico, heraldico, biographico, bibliographico, numismatico e artistico (in Portuguese). Vol. IV. Lisboa: J. Romano Torres. pp. 573–574.
- Sanceau, Elaine (1970). Reign of the Fortunate King, 1495–1521: Manuel I of Portugal. Hamden, Conn.: Archon Books. ISBN 0-2080096-8-X.
- Stephens, H. Morse (1891). The Story of Portugal. New York: G. P. Putnam's Sons.
- Valentim, Carlos Baptista (2006). O Infante D. Luís (1506-1555) e a Investigação do Mar no Renascimento. Lisbon: Academia de Marinha.
- Nobreza de Portugal e do Brasil (in Portuguese). Vol. I. Lisbon: Zairol Lda. 1989. pp. 382–384.
