= 2015 Currie Cup First Division =

Domestic rugby union competition

- Countries: South Africa
- Date: 29 August – 8 October 2015
- Champions: Leopards (1st title)
- Runners-up: SWD Eagles
- Matches played: 18
- Tries scored: 158 (average 8.8 per match)
- Top point scorer: Leighton Eksteen (102)
- Top try scorer: Juan Language (5)

The 2015 Currie Cup First Division was contested from 29 August to 8 October 2015. The tournament (also known as the Absa Currie Cup First Division for sponsorship reasons) was the second tier of South Africa's premier domestic rugby union competition, featuring teams representing either entire provinces or substantial regions within provinces.

The tournament was won by the Leopards for the first time after they beat the SWD Eagles 44–20 in the final played on 8 October 2015. The Leopards also went through the season unbeaten, winning their five matches in the 2015 Currie Cup qualification that counted towards the First Division and the seven matches player in the First Division proper.

After the season, all six teams joined the eight Premier Division teams and Namibia in an expanded 15-team Currie Cup competition for 2016.

== Competition rules and information ==
There were six participating teams in the 2015 Currie Cup First Division. The six teams played each other twice over the course of the season, once at home and once away. The first series of fixtures were played as part of the 2015 Currie Cup qualification competition, with all results carried forward to the First Division except for the match against the 2015 Currie Cup Premier Division qualifier, Griquas. A second set of fixtures then followed between the remaining six teams.

Each team received four points for a win and two points for a draw. Bonus points were awarded to teams that scored 4 or more tries in a game, as well as to teams that lost a match by 7 points or less. Teams were ranked by points, then points difference (points scored less points conceded).

The top 4 teams qualified for the title play-offs. In the semi-finals, the team that finished first had home advantage against the team that finished fourth, while the team that finished second had home advantage against the team that finished third. The winners of these semi-finals played each other in the final, at the home venue of the higher-placed team.

== Teams ==
Location of teams in the 2015 Currie Cup First Division

Following the 2015 Currie Cup qualification competition, the following six teams were confirmed as the competitors in the 2015 Currie Cup First Division:

2015 Currie Cup First Division teams
Team	Sponsored Name	Stadium/s	Sponsored Name
Boland Cavaliers	Boland Cavaliers	Boland Stadium, Wellington	Boland Stadium
Border Bulldogs	Border Bulldogs	Buffalo City Stadium, East London	Buffalo City Stadium
Falcons	Hino Valke	Barnard Stadium, Kempton Park	Barnard Stadium
Griffons	Down Touch Griffons	North West Stadium, Welkom	HT Pelatona Projects Stadium
Leopards	Leopards	Olën Park, Potchefstroom	Profert Olën Park
SWD Eagles	SWD Eagles	Outeniqua Park, George	Outeniqua Park

== Log ==
The final log of the round-robin stage of the 2015 Currie Cup First Division is:

2015 Currie Cup First Division log
Pos	Team	Pld	W	D	L	PF	PA	PD	TF	TA	TB	LB	Pts	Qualification
1	Leopards	10	10	0	0	431	205	+226	62	26	10	0	50	semi-finals
2	Griffons	10	5	0	5	332	306	+26	46	43	6	2	28	semi-finals
3	SWD Eagles	10	5	1	4	269	243	+26	33	31	2	3	27	semi-finals
4	Falcons	10	5	0	5	306	278	+28	45	37	4	2	26	semi-finals
5	Boland Cavaliers	10	2	1	7	203	435	−232	27	61	2	1	13	
6	Border Bulldogs	10	2	0	8	211	285	−74	23	38	1	3	12	

Rules for classification: 4 points for a win; 2 points for a draw; 1 bonus point for a loss by seven points or less; 1 bonus point for scoring four or more tries in a match

The teams' playing records from the 2015 Currie Cup qualification series brought forward to the First Division were as follows:

Playing records brought forward
Pos	Team	Pld	W	D	L	PF	PA	PD	TF	TA	TB	LB	Pts
1	Leopards	5	5	0	0	216	69	+147	31	9	5	0	25
2	Boland Cavaliers	5	2	1	2	121	149	−28	16	17	2	1	13
3	Falcons	5	3	0	2	115	152	−37	15	20	1	0	13
4	Griffons	5	2	0	3	151	154	−3	20	22	2	1	11
5	SWD Eagles	5	1	1	3	102	133	−31	12	16	0	2	8
6	Border Bulldogs	5	1	0	4	75	123	−48	7	17	0	2	6

=== Round-by-round ===
The table below shows each team's progression throughout the season.

For each round, each team's cumulative points total is shown with the overall log position in brackets.

Team Progression – 2015 Currie Cup First Division
Team	B/F	R8	R9	R10	R11	R12	SF	F
Leopards	25 (1st)	30 (1st)	35 (1st)	40 (1st)	45 (1st)	50 (1st)	Won	Won
Griffons	11 (4th)	16 (3rd)	21 (2nd)	22 (3rd)	27 (2nd)	28 (2nd)	Lost	—
SWD Eagles	8 (5th)	9 (5th)	13 (4th)	17 (4th)	22 (4th)	27 (3rd)	Won	Lost
Falcons	13 (3rd)	18 (2nd)	19 (3rd)	24 (2nd)	24 (3rd)	26 (4th)	Lost	—
Boland Cavaliers	13 (2nd)	13 (4th)	13 (5th)	13 (5th)	13 (5th)	13 (6th)	—	—
Border Bulldogs	6 (6th)	6 (6th)	6 (6th)	6 (6th)	7 (6th)	12 (6th)	—	—
Key:	win	draw	loss	bye				

== Fixtures and results ==
All the results from the 2015 Currie Cup qualification tournament was carried forward into the First Division season. The results against the 2015 Currie Cup Premier Division qualifier – Griquas – was discarded.

The following matches were played in the 2015 Currie Cup First Division:

=== Round Eight ===
The Leopards secured a semi-final spot after beating the SWD Eagles 36–31 in a match in Potchefstroom. Leopards captain Juan Language scored a hat-trick and tighthead prop John-Roy Jenkinson got two tries, while SWD fly-half Leighton Eksteen contributed 16 points with the boot to secure a bonus point for the visitors. The biggest victory of the round came in Welkom, where defending champions the Griffons ran in ten tries in a 62–24 win over the Boland Cavaliers, with Boela Abrahams, Nico Scheepers and Martin Sithole getting a brace each, as did Danwel Demas for the losing side. Friedle Olivier and Jacques Verwey each scored two tries in the Falcons' 48–27 win over the Border Bulldogs to move the side from Kempton Park up to second spot on the log.

29 August 2015	Leopards	36–31	SWD Eagles	Olën Park, Potchefstroom
14:30	Try: Juan Language 8', 54', 60'; John-Roy Jenkinson 20', 47'; Con: Adriaan Engelbrecht 21', 48', 55', 61' (4/5); Pen: Adriaan Engelbrecht (0/1); Drop: Rhyno Smith 34' (1/1); Cards: Rhyno Smith (yellow card) 4' to 15'	Report; Scoreboard	Try: Grant le Roux 26'; Charles Radebe 63'; Clinton Wagman 74'; Con: Leighton Eksteen 27', 64' (2/3); Pen: Leighton Eksteen 2', 4', 35', 58' (4/4); Cards: Wayne Khan (yellow card) 38' to 48'	Referee: Rasta Rasivhenge

29 August 2015	Falcons	48–27	Border Bulldogs	Barnard Stadium, Kempton Park
15:00	Try: Jacques Verwey 32', 53'; Jaco Snyman 58'; Friedle Olivier 64', 70'; Johan Pretorius 76'; Willie Odendaal 78'; Con: Kyle Hendricks (0/1); Anrich Richter 54', 59', 65', 71', 77' (5/6); Pen: Kyle Hendricks (0/1); Drop: Anrich Richter 1' (1/1)	Report; Scoreboard	Try: Makazole Mapimpi 21'; Sipho Nofemele 46'; Con: Masixole Banda 22' (1/2); Pen: Logan Basson 15', 55' (2/2); Masixole Banda 5', 9', 28' (3/4); Cards: Siyamthanda Ngande (yellow card) 69' to 79'	Referee: Ben Crouse

29 August 2015	Griffons	62–24	Boland Cavaliers	HT Pelatona Projects Stadium, Welkom
15:00	Try: Nico Scheepers 6', 72'; Boela Abrahams 18', 27'; Martin Sithole 38', 46'; Boela Serfontein 51'; Norman Nelson 65'; Enver Brandt 74'; Frans Sisita 79'; Con: Nico Scheepers (0/2); Franna du Toit 28', 39', 47', 66', 75', 80' (6/8)	Report; Scoreboard	Try: Danwel Demas 25', 42'; Kenan Cronjé 78'; Con: Eric Zana 26', 43', 78' (3/3); Pen: Eric Zana 35' (1/1); Cards: Wayne Wilschut (yellow card) 36' to 47'	Referee: Stephan Geldenhuys

=== Round Nine ===
The Leopards guaranteed themselves a home semi-final after beating the Boland Cavaliers 47–12 in Wellington. Despite Boland taking the lead in the first minute through a Danwel Demas try, the Leopards responded with seven tries scored by seven different players. One of the try-scorers was Adriaan Engelbrecht, who also converted six of the tries for a personal haul of 17 points. The Griffons moved into the top two after winning their second match in a row, winning 31–16 in East London against bottom side the Border Bulldogs and picking up a bonus point for scoring five tries in the match. Griffons captain Nicky Steyn scored a try in the first half in his 121st and final match for the side from Welkom. In the final match of the round, the SWD Eagles scored a try in the final minute of the match to beat the Falcons 21–17 in George, despite the home team playing the majority of the match with 14 players after the sending off of Clinton Wagman in the 28th minute.

4 September 2015	Border Bulldogs	16–31	Griffons	Buffalo City Stadium, East London
19:00	Try: Mihlali Mpafi 48'; Lundi Ralarala 74'; Con: Logan Basson (0/2); Pen: Masixole Banda 38' (1/1); Logan Basson 44' (1/2); Cards: Lukhanyo Am (yellow card) 55' to 65'	Report; Scoreboard	Try: Vincent Maruping 24'; Nicky Steyn 35'; Marco Klopper 53'; Enver Brandt 71'; Vuyo Mbotho 80'; Con: Franna du Toit 36' (1/2); Nico Scheepers 54', 81' (2/3); Pen: Franna du Toit (0/1)	Referee: Stephan Geldenhuys

4 September 2015	SWD Eagles	21–17	Falcons	Outeniqua Park, George
19:00	Try: Leighton Eksteen 24'; Alshaun Bock 80'; Con: Leighton Eksteen 81' (1/2); Pen: Leighton Eksteen 6', 23', 39' (3/4); Cards: Clinton Wagman (red card) 28'	Report; Scoreboard	Try: Jacques Verwey 4'; Kyle Hendricks 14'; Friedle Olivier 54'; Con: Jaun Kotzé 55' (1/3)	Referee: Cwengile Jadezweni

5 September 2015	Boland Cavaliers	12–47	Leopards	Boland Stadium, Wellington
15:30	Try: Danwel Demas 1'; Chaney Willemse 62'; Con: Eric Zana 63' (1/2); Pen: Eric Zana (0/1); Drop: Warren Seals (0/1)	Report; Scoreboard	Try: Rhyno Smith 23'; Adriaan Engelbrecht 32'; Tyler Fisher 36'; Loftus Morrison 42'; Juan Language 66'; Wilmar Arnoldi 71'; Lucian Cupido 78'; Con: Adriaan Engelbrecht 24', 33', 37', 43', 67', 72' (6/7)	Referee: Quinton Immelman

=== Round Ten ===
The Falcons secure a semi-final berth after demolishing the Boland Cavaliers 76–12 in Kempton Park. They scored twelve tries in the victory from ten different try-scorers, with Etienne Taljaard and Shane Kirkwood getting two each, while Jaun Kotzé converted eight of the tries. The Leopards won again, scoring nine tries in a 64–34 victory over the Griffons, who also secure a bonus point by scoring four tries. Schalk Hugo and Tyler Fisher each scored two tries for the Leopards and Adriaan Engelbrecht kicked 17 points for the Leopards. In the other match of the round, the SWD Eagles beat the Border Bulldogs 31–19 in East London. Both teams scored three tries, but 16 points from the boot of SWD Eagles fly-half Leighton Eksteen proved decisive in the match.

11 September 2015	Border Bulldogs	19–31	SWD Eagles	Buffalo City Stadium, East London
19:00	Try: Onke Dubase 31'; Ntando Kebe 48'; Masixole Banda 61'; Con: Masixole Banda 49', 62' (2/3); Pen: Masixole Banda (0/1); Cards: Yanga Xakalashe (yellow card) 41' to 52'	Report; Scoreboard	Try: Alshaun Bock 25'; Dillin Snel 50'; Brian Skosana 79'; Con: Leighton Eksteen 26', 51' (2/3); Pen: Leighton Eksteen 19', 35', 63', 65' (4/5); Cards: Buran Parks (yellow card) 45' to 56'	Referee: Rodney Boneparte

12 September 2015	Leopards	64–34	Griffons	Fanie du Toit Sport Ground, Potchefstroom
14:30	Try: Joe Smith 9'; Tyler Fisher 13', 45'; Schalk Hugo 43', 66'; Bart le Roux 48'; Damian Engledoe 50'; Adrian Vermeulen 52'; Juan Language 75'; Con: Adriaan Engelbrecht 10', 14', 44', 46', 49', 51', 53' (7/7); Tiaan Dorfling 67' (1/1); Schalk Hugo (0/1); Pen: Adriaan Engelbrecht 7' (1/1); Cards: Juan Language (yellow card) 63' to 74'; Loftus Morrison (yellow card) 72'	Report; Scoreboard	Try: Martin Sithole 38'; Vuyo Mbotho 58'; Wynand Pienaar 71'; Khwezi Mkhafu 80'; Con: Franna du Toit 39', 59', 72' (3/3); Wynand Pienaar 81' (1/1); Pen: Franna du Toit 2', 16' (2/2)	Referee: Ben Crouse

12 September 2015	Falcons	76–12	Boland Cavaliers	Barnard Stadium, Kempton Park
15:00	Try: Christopher Bosch 5'; Etienne Taljaard 8', 48'; Anrich Richter 10'; Shane Kirkwood 19', 33'; Andries Schutte 43'; Johan Pretorius 51'; Andries Truter 55'; Dean Muir 59'; JP Mostert 71'; Andrew van Wyk 79'; Con: Jaun Kotzé 9', 11', 34', 44', 49', 52', 56', 72' (8/12)	Report; Scoreboard	Try: Clemen Lewis 24'; TC Botha 69'; Con: Eric Zana (0/1); Warren Seals 70' (1/1); Cards: Gavin Annandale (yellow card) 57' to 67'	Referee: Pro Legoete

=== Round Eleven ===
Defending champions the Griffons secured their place in the semi-finals by beating the Falcons 30–21 in a match in Welkom. Despite having three players sin-binned during the course of the match and being down to thirteen players at one stage, the home side won the match and secured a bonus point for scoring five tries in the match, with prop Danie van der Merwe and loose-forward Vincent Maruping getting two tries each. The SWD Eagles finalised the semi-final line-up by beating the Boland Cavaliers 57–14 in Wellington. Charles Radebe and Brian Skosana each got a hat-trick of tries in the victory as the SWD Eagles ran in nine tries to end Boland's play-off hopes. There was nearly a major upset in the top-versus-bottom match as the Leopards needed a late Adriaan Engelbrecht penalty to beat the Border Bulldogs 32–30 in Potchefstroom.

19 September 2015	Leopards	32–30	Border Bulldogs	Olën Park, Potchefstroom
14:30	Try: Rhyno Smith 17'; Schalk Hugo 31'; Francois Robertse 33'; Joe Smith 58'; Con: Rhyno Smith 18' (1/1); Schalk Hugo 32', 34' (2/2); Adriaan Engelbrecht (0/1); Pen: Adriaan Engelbrecht 74', 78' (2/2); Cards: Adrian Vermeulen (yellow card) 9' to 19'	Report; Scoreboard	Try: Oliver Zono 61'; Sethu Tom 65'; Makazole Mapimpi 68'; Con: Oliver Zono 62', 66', 69' (3/3); Pen: Logan Basson 42' (1/2); Oliver Zono 26', 75' (2/2); Cards: Onke Dubase (yellow card) 73'	Referee: Rodney Boneparte

19 September 2015	Griffons	30–21	Falcons	HT Pelatona Projects Stadium, Welkom
15:00	Try: Danie van der Merwe 10', 58'; Vincent Maruping 42', 50'; Coenie van Wyk 70'; Con: Franna du Toit (0/3); Nico Scheepers 59' (1/2); Pen: Franna du Toit (0/1); Nico Scheepers 79' (1/2); Cards: Marco Klopper (yellow card) 30' to 41'; Chris Ehlers (yellow card) 35' to 45'; Boetie Groenewald (yellow card) 61' to 71'	Report; Scoreboard	Try: Etienne Taljaard 19'; Johan Pretorius 28'; JP Mostert 32'; Con: Jaun Kotzé 20', 29', 33' (3/3)	Referee: Pro Legoete

19 September 2015	Boland Cavaliers	14–57	SWD Eagles	Boland Stadium, Wellington
15:30	Try: Danwel Demas 50'; Kenan Cronjé 59'; Con: Eric Zana 51', 60' (2/2); Pen: Warren Seals (0/2); Cards: Gerrit van Wyk (yellow card) 23' to 33'	Report; Scoreboard	Try: Alshaun Bock 20'; Brian Skosana 24', 38', 80'; Charles Radebe 30', 36', 77'; Luzuko Vulindlu 33'; Pieter Stemmet 43'; Con: Leighton Eksteen 25', 31', 34', 37', 39' (5/7); Tom Kean 81' (1/2)	Referee: Ben Crouse

=== Round Twelve ===
The Leopards concluded the round-robin stage of their Currie Cup campaign with a perfect record; not only did they win all five of their matches, as well as their five matches in the 2015 Currie Cup qualification series that were brought forward to the First Division, but they also gained a four-try bonus point in each of their ten matches to top the log on 50 points. Tyler Fisher scored two of their six tries in their 36–29 win over a Falcons side that scored five tries of their own. The SWD Eagles finished in third spot on the log with a late try from Kurt Haupt (his second of the match) securing a bonus point for the SWD Eagles in a 27–24 over the Griffons, who finished in second spot. The Border Bulldogs won the match between two sides without a victory to their name since the qualification tournament, beating the Boland Cavaliers 44–20 in East London. Lundi Ralarala and Oliver Zono scored two tries each for the home side, who finished bottom of the log, one point behind the Boland Cavaliers.

25 September 2015	Falcons	29–36	Leopards	Barnard Stadium, Kempton Park
15:00	Try: Kyle Hendricks 23'; Andrew van Wyk 36'; Riaan Arends 45'; Reg Muller 67'; Shane Kirkwood 77'; Con: Anrich Richter 24' (1/3); Jaun Kotzé 78' (1/2); Pen: Anrich Richter (0/1); Cards: Riaan Arends (yellow card) 22' to 32'	Report; Scoreboard	Try: Tyler Fisher 12', 50'; Francois Robertse 18'; Rhyno Smith 33'; Malherbe Swart 38'; Adrian Vermeulen 62'; Con: Schalk Hugo 63' (1/3); Adriaan Engelbrecht 39', 51' (2/3); Cards: Malherbe Swart (yellow card) 66' to 76'; Robert Kruger (yellow card) 74'	Referee: AJ Jacobs

25 September 2015	Border Bulldogs	44–20	Boland Cavaliers	Buffalo City Stadium, East London
19:00	Try: Oliver Zono 11', 81'; Michael Makase 24'; Lundi Ralarala 57', 71'; Makazole Mapimpi 65'; Con: Logan Basson 12', 58' (2/3); Oliver Zono 72', 81' (2/3); Pen: Logan Basson 4', 15' (2/3); Oliver Zono (0/1)	Report; Scoreboard	Try: Chaney Willemse 6'; Eric Zana 13'; Con: Warren Seals 7', 14' (2/2); Pen: Warren Seals 41', 60' (2/2)	Referee: Cwengile Jadezweni

25 September 2015	SWD Eagles	27–24	Griffons	Outeniqua Park, George
19:00	Try: Zandré Jordaan 2'; Schalk Oelofse 20'; Kurt Haupt 52', 79'; Con: Leighton Eksteen 21', 53' (2/4); Pen: Leighton Eksteen 8' (1/2); Cards: Brian Skosana (yellow card) 16' to 26'; Charles Radebe (yellow card) 33'	Report; Scoreboard	Try: Vuyo Mbotho 16'; Coenie van Wyk 26'; Con: Nico Scheepers 17' (1/2); Pen: Nico Scheepers 36', 65', 81' (3/3); Drop: Coenie van Wyk 69' (1/1); Cards: Coenie van Wyk (yellow card) 28' to 38'; Wynand Pienaar (yellow card) 71' to 79'	Referee: Stephan Geldenhuys

=== Title Play-Off Games ===
==== Semi-finals ====
In a repeat of the 2014 semi-finals, the Leopards hosted the Falcons and the Griffons hosted the SWD Eagles. The Falcons caused an upset in 2014 by beating the Leopards, but the Leopards prevailed on this occasion, despite being outscored three tries to two. Five penalties from centre Adriaan Engelbrecht secured a 29–17 win for the side from Potchefstroom to secure a home final. There, they will face the SWD Eagles, who beat defending champions the Griffons 47–40 in Welkom. Both sides scored five tries in the encounter, but six penalties from SWD Eagles fly-half Leighton Eksteen (who contributed 27 points in the match) decided the semi-final in the away team's favour.

2 October 2015	Leopards	29–17	Falcons	Olën Park, Potchefstroom
16:00	Try: Dane van der Westhuyzen 33'; Rhyno Smith 75'; Con: Adriaan Engelbrecht 34', 76' (2/2); Pen: Adriaan Engelbrecht 1', 6', 14', 37', 67' (5/5)	Report; Scoreboard	Try: Etienne Taljaard 29'; Grant Janke 47'; Johan Pretorius 58'; Con: Jaun Kotzé 30' (1/3)	Referee: Cwengile Jadezweni

3 October 2015	Griffons	40–47	SWD Eagles	HT Pelatona Projects Stadium, Welkom
15:00	Try: Martin Sithole 19'; Wynand Pienaar 26'; Danie van der Merwe 36'; Franna du Toit 45'; Boetie Groenewald 76'; Con: Nico Scheepers 20', 27', 77' (3/5); Pen: Nico Scheepers 9', 11', 60' (3/3)	Report; Scoreboard	Try: Wayne Khan 3'; Leighton Eksteen 6'; Charles Radebe 23'; Martin du Toit 33'; Andisa Ntsila 56'; Con: Leighton Eksteen 4', 57' (2/5); Pen: Leighton Eksteen 15', 39', 53', 64', 70', 75' (6/6)	Referee: Ben Crouse

==== Final ====
The Leopards won the Currie Cup First Division by overturning a 10–20 half-time deficit to beat the SWD Eagles 44–20 in Potchefstroom. Leopards captain Juan Language scored two tries for the hosts in the second half to aid his side's comeback, also becoming the top scorer in the competition in the process. The top points scorer in the competition was SWD Eagles back Leighton Eksteen, who scored ten of his side's 20 points on the night.

8 October 2015	Leopards	44–20	SWD Eagles	Olën Park, Potchefstroom
18:00	Try: Dane van der Westhuyzen 27'; Francois Robertse 45'; Juan Language 51', 63'; Robert Kruger 66'; Bart le Roux 80'; Con: Adriaan Engelbrecht 28', 46', 67', 81' (4/6); Pen: Adriaan Engelbrecht 15', 72' (2/2)	Report; Scoreboard	Try: Alshaun Bock 17'; Luzuko Vulindlu 21'; Con: Leighton Eksteen 18', 22' (2/2); Pen: Leighton Eksteen 6', 25' (2/2); Drop: Leighton Eksteen (0/1)	Referee: Quinton Immelman

== Honours ==
The honour roll for the 2015 Currie Cup First Division was:

2015 Currie Cup First Division Honours
Champions:	Leopards (1st title)
Top Try Scorer:	Juan Language, Leopards (7)
Top Points Scorer:	Leighton Eksteen, SWD Eagles (102)

== Players ==
=== Points scorers ===
The following table contain points which were scored in the 2015 Currie Cup First Division:

All point scorers
No	Player	Team	T	C	P	DG	Pts
1	Leighton Eksteen	SWD Eagles	2	16	20	0	102
2	Adriaan Engelbrecht	Leopards	1	25	10	0	85
3	Nico Scheepers	Griffons	2	7	7	0	45
4	Juan Language	Leopards	7	0	0	0	35
5	Franna du Toit	Griffons	1	10	2	0	31
5	Oliver Zono	Border Bulldogs	3	5	2	0	31
7	Jaun Kotzé	Falcons	0	14	0	0	28
8	Tyler Fisher	Leopards	5	0	0	0	25
8	Charles Radebe	SWD Eagles	5	0	0	0	25
8	Rhyno Smith	Leopards	4	1	0	1	25

Other point scorers
No	Player	Team	T	C	P	DG	Pts
11	Masixole Banda	Border Bulldogs	1	3	4	0	23
12	Logan Basson	Border Bulldogs	0	2	6	0	22
13	Schalk Hugo	Leopards	3	3	0	0	21
14	Alshaun Bock	SWD Eagles	4	0	0	0	20
14	Danwel Demas	Boland Cavaliers	4	0	0	0	20
14	Johan Pretorius	Falcons	4	0	0	0	20
14	Anrich Richter	Falcons	1	6	0	1	20
14	Martin Sithole	Griffons	4	0	0	0	20
14	Brian Skosana	SWD Eagles	4	0	0	0	20
14	Etienne Taljaard	Falcons	4	0	0	0	20
14	Eric Zana	Boland Cavaliers	1	6	1	0	20
22	Shane Kirkwood	Falcons	3	0	0	0	15
22	Makazole Mapimpi	Border Bulldogs	3	0	0	0	15
22	Vincent Maruping	Griffons	3	0	0	0	15
22	Vuyo Mbotho	Griffons	3	0	0	0	15
22	Friedle Olivier	Falcons	3	0	0	0	15
22	Lundi Ralarala	Border Bulldogs	3	0	0	0	15
22	Francois Robertse	Leopards	3	0	0	0	15
22	Danie van der Merwe	Griffons	3	0	0	0	15
22	Jacques Verwey	Falcons	3	0	0	0	15
31	Coenie van Wyk	Griffons	2	0	0	1	13
32	Wynand Pienaar	Griffons	2	1	0	0	12
32	Warren Seals	Boland Cavaliers	0	3	2	0	12
34	Boela Abrahams	Griffons	2	0	0	0	10
34	Enver Brandt	Griffons	2	0	0	0	10
34	Kenan Cronjé	Boland Cavaliers	2	0	0	0	10
34	Kurt Haupt	SWD Eagles	2	0	0	0	10
34	Kyle Hendricks	Falcons	2	0	0	0	10
34	John-Roy Jenkinson	Leopards	2	0	0	0	10
34	Bart le Roux	Leopards	2	0	0	0	10
34	JP Mostert	Falcons	2	0	0	0	10
34	Joe Smith	Leopards	2	0	0	0	10
34	Andrew van Wyk	Falcons	2	0	0	0	10
34	Dane van der Westhuyzen	Leopards	2	0	0	0	10
34	Adrian Vermeulen	Leopards	2	0	0	0	10
34	Luzuko Vulindlu	SWD Eagles	2	0	0	0	10
34	Chaney Willemse	Boland Cavaliers	2	0	0	0	10
48	Riaan Arends	Falcons	1	0	0	0	5
48	Wilmar Arnoldi	Leopards	1	0	0	0	5
48	Christopher Bosch	Falcons	1	0	0	0	5
48	TC Botha	Boland Cavaliers	1	0	0	0	5
48	Lucian Cupido	Leopards	1	0	0	0	5
48	Martin du Toit	SWD Eagles	1	0	0	0	5
48	Onke Dubase	Border Bulldogs	1	0	0	0	5
48	Damian Engledoe	Leopards	1	0	0	0	5
48	Boetie Groenewald	Griffons	1	0	0	0	5
48	Grant Janke	Falcons	1	0	0	0	5
48	Zandré Jordaan	SWD Eagles	1	0	0	0	5
48	Ntando Kebe	Border Bulldogs	1	0	0	0	5
48	Wayne Khan	SWD Eagles	1	0	0	0	5
48	Marco Klopper	Griffons	1	0	0	0	5
48	Robert Kruger	Leopards	1	0	0	0	5
48	Grant le Roux	SWD Eagles	1	0	0	0	5
48	Clemen Lewis	Boland Cavaliers	1	0	0	0	5
48	Michael Makase	Border Bulldogs	1	0	0	0	5
48	Khwezi Mkhafu	Griffons	1	0	0	0	5
48	Loftus Morrison	Leopards	1	0	0	0	5
48	Mihlali Mpafi	Border Bulldogs	1	0	0	0	5
48	Dean Muir	Falcons	1	0	0	0	5
48	Reg Muller	Falcons	1	0	0	0	5
48	Norman Nelson	Griffons	1	0	0	0	5
48	Sipho Nofemele	Border Bulldogs	1	0	0	0	5
48	Andisa Ntsila	SWD Eagles	1	0	0	0	5
48	Willie Odendaal	Falcons	1	0	0	0	5
48	Schalk Oelofse	SWD Eagles	1	0	0	0	5
48	Andries Schutte	Falcons	1	0	0	0	5
48	Boela Serfontein	Griffons	1	0	0	0	5
48	Frans Sisita	Griffons	1	0	0	0	5
48	Dillin Snel	SWD Eagles	1	0	0	0	5
48	Jaco Snyman	Falcons	1	0	0	0	5
48	Pieter Stemmet	SWD Eagles	1	0	0	0	5
48	Nicky Steyn	Griffons	1	0	0	0	5
48	Malherbe Swart	Leopards	1	0	0	0	5
48	Sethu Tom	Border Bulldogs	1	0	0	0	5
48	Andries Truter	Falcons	1	0	0	0	5
48	Clinton Wagman	SWD Eagles	1	0	0	0	5
87	Tiaan Dorfling	Leopards	0	1	0	0	2
87	Tom Kean	SWD Eagles	0	1	0	0	2
* Legend: T = Tries, C = Conversions, P = Penalties, DG = Drop Goals, Pts = Points.

=== Appearances ===
The player appearance record in the 2015 Currie Cup First Division is as follows:

Boland Cavaliers
Name	GRF	LEO	GFA	SWD	BDR	SF	F	App	Try	Kck	Pts
SP Wessels	1			1	1	—	—	3	0	0	0
Clemen Lewis	2		2	2	2	—	—	4	1	0	5
Keenan Abrahams	3	3	3	17 (substituted in)	3	—	—	5	0	0	0
Hanno Kitshoff	4	4	4	4		—	—	4	0	0	0
Gavin Annandale (c)	5	5	5	5	5	—	—	5	0	0	0
Freginald Africa	6	6		18 (substituted in)	6	—	—	4	0	0	0
Yves Bashiya	7	18 (substituted in)	18 (substituted in)	19 (substituted in)	4	—	—	5	0	0	0
Wayne Wilschut	8	8	8	8	8	—	—	5	0	0	0
Jovelian de Koker	9	9	9	13	9	—	—	5	0	0	0
Adriaan Carelse	10	21 (substituted in)	21 (substituted in)	10	21	—	—	4	0	0	0
Ryno Conradie	11			20 (substituted in)		—	—	2	0	0	0
Jos Malherbe	12	13	13		12	—	—	4	0	0	0
Wilneth Engelbrecht	13					—	—	1	0	0	0
Danwel Demas	14	14	14	14	14	—	—	5	4	0	20
Eric Zana	15	15	15	22 (substituted in)	15	—	—	5	1	15	20
Chadley Wenn	16 (substituted in)	2				—	—	2	0	0	0
Deacon Chowles	17 (substituted in)	1	1			—	—	3	0	0	0
Chaney Willemse	18 (substituted in)	7	6	7	7	—	—	5	2	0	10
Kenan Cronjé	19 (substituted in)	19 (substituted in)	7	6	19	—	—	5	2	0	10
Marnus Hugo	20 (substituted in)	20 (substituted in)	20 (substituted in)	9	20 (substituted in)	—	—	5	0	0	0
Warren Seals	21 (substituted in)	10	10	12	10	—	—	5	0	12	12
Senan van der Merwe	22 (substituted in)	11	11			—	—	3	0	0	0
Edwin Sass		12		21 (substituted in)	13	—	—	3	0	0	0
JC Genade		16 (substituted in)		16 (substituted in)	16 (substituted in)	—	—	3	0	0	0
Herman Bailey		17 (substituted in)	17 (substituted in)		17 (substituted in)	—	—	3	0	0	0
Arno Fortuin		22 (substituted in)				—	—	1	0	0	0
Hennie Daniller			12	15	22 (substituted in)	—	—	3	0	0	0
Ashton Constant			16 (substituted in)	3		—	—	2	0	0	0
TC Botha			19 (substituted in)		18	—	—	1	1	0	5
Gerrit van Wyk			22 (substituted in)	11	11	—	—	3	0	0	0
Total								5	11	27	82

Border Bulldogs
Name	GFA	GRF	SWD	LEO	BOL	SF	F	App	Try	Kck	Pts
Buhle Mxunyelwa	1	3	3	3	3	—	—	5	0	0	0
Mihlali Mpafi	2	2	2	2	2	—	—	5	1	0	5
Yanga Xakalashe	3	1	1	1	1	—	—	5	0	0	0
Lindokuhle Welemu	4	4	4	4	4	—	—	5	0	0	0
Wandile Putuma	5	5	5	5	19 (substituted in)	—	—	5	0	0	0
Onke Dubase	6	6	6	6	6	—	—	5	1	0	5
Siya Mdaka (c)	7	7	7	7	7	—	—	5	0	0	0
Billy Dutton	8	8	8	8	8	—	—	5	0	0	0
Ntando Kebe	9	9	9	9	9	—	—	5	1	0	5
Masixole Banda	10	10	15	22 (substituted in)	22 (substituted in)	—	—	5	1	18	23
Sipho Nofemele	11	11				—	—	2	1	0	5
Lukhanyo Am	12	12	12	12	12	—	—	5	0	0	0
Lundi Ralarala	13	13	13	13	13	—	—	5	3	0	15
Makazole Mapimpi	14		11	11	11	—	—	4	3	0	15
Logan Basson	15	15	22 (substituted in)	15	15	—	—	5	0	22	22
Josh Kota	16 (substituted in)	16 (substituted in)	16	16 (substituted in)	16 (substituted in)	—	—	4	0	0	0
Blake Kyd	17 (substituted in)	17 (substituted in)	17 (substituted in)	17 (substituted in)	17 (substituted in)	—	—	5	0	0	0
Siyamthanda Ngande	18 (substituted in)	18 (substituted in)				—	—	2	0	0	0
Nkosi Nofuma	19 (substituted in)	19 (substituted in)				—	—	2	0	0	0
Bangi Kobese	20 (substituted in)	20 (substituted in)	20 (substituted in)	20 (substituted in)	20 (substituted in)	—	—	5	0	0	0
Thembani Mkokeli	21 (substituted in)	21 (substituted in)	10			—	—	3	0	0	0
Michael Makase	22 (substituted in)	14	14	14	14	—	—	5	1	0	5
Oliver Zono		22		10	10	—	—	2	3	16	31
Johannes Jonker			18 (substituted in)	18 (substituted in)	18 (substituted in)	—	—	3	0	0	0
Siya November			19 (substituted in)	19 (substituted in)	5	—	—	3	0	0	0
Sethu Tom			21 (substituted in)	21 (substituted in)	21 (substituted in)	—	—	3	1	0	5
Total								5	16	56	136

Falcons
Name	BDR	SWD	BOL	GRF	LEO	SF	F	App	Try	Kck	Pts
Andries Schutte	1	1	1	1	1	1	—	6	1	0	5
Dean Muir	2	2	2	2	2	2	—	6	1	0	5
Nico Pretorius	3	3				17	—	2	0	0	0
Isak Deetlefs	4	5	18 (substituted in)	18 (substituted in)	5		—	5	0	0	0
Jacques Alberts	5	18 (substituted in)	5	5		5	—	5	0	0	0
JP Mostert (c)	6	6	6	6	6	6	—	6	2	0	10
Jacques Verwey	7	7	7	7	7	7	—	6	3	0	15
Friedle Olivier	8	8	19 (substituted in)	19 (substituted in)			—	4	3	0	15
Jaco Snyman	9	9	20 (substituted in)	20 (substituted in)	9	9	—	6	1	0	5
Anrich Richter	10	10	10	10	10	10	—	6	1	15	20
Coert Cronjé	11					22 (substituted in)	—	2	0	0	0
Willie Odendaal	12	12	22 (substituted in)	12	21 (substituted in)	12	—	6	1	0	5
Christopher Bosch	13	13	13				—	3	1	0	5
Grant Janke	14	11			13	13	—	4	1	0	5
Kyle Hendricks	15	14	14		15	14	—	5	2	0	10
Themba Thabethe	16 (substituted in)			16 (substituted in)	16 (substituted in)		—	3	0	0	0
Thulani Ngidi	17 (substituted in)	17 (substituted in)	3	3	3	3	—	6	0	0	0
Shane Kirkwood	18 (substituted in)	4	4	4	4	4	—	6	3	0	15
Reg Muller	19 (substituted in)	19 (substituted in)	8	8	8	8	—	6	1	0	5
Johan Pretorius	20 (substituted in)	20 (substituted in)	9	9	20 (substituted in)	20 (substituted in)	—	6	4	0	20
Andrew van Wyk	21	21 (substituted in)	21 (substituted in)	21 (substituted in)	12	21 (substituted in)	—	5	2	0	10
Arno Poley	22 (substituted in)	22 (substituted in)		14			—	3	0	0	0
Jaun Kotzé		15	15	15	22 (substituted in)	15	—	5	0	28	28
Barend Steyn		16 (substituted in)	16 (substituted in)			16	—	2	0	0	0
Etienne Taljaard			11	11	11	11	—	4	4	0	20
Andries Truter			12	13			—	2	1	0	5
Dandré van der Westhuizen			17 (substituted in)	17 (substituted in)	17 (substituted in)		—	3	0	0	0
Riaan Arends				22 (substituted in)	14		—	2	1	0	5
Marlyn Williams					18 (substituted in)	18 (substituted in)	—	2	0	0	0
Ernst Ladendorf					19 (substituted in)	19 (substituted in)	—	2	0	0	0
Total								6	33	43	208

Griffons
Name	BOL	BDR	LEO	GFA	SWD	SF	F	App	Try	Kck	Pts
Rudi Britz	1	1					—	2	0	0	0
Khwezi Mkhafu	2		2	16 (substituted in)	2	2	—	5	1	0	5
Heinrich Roelfse	3	3	3	3	17 (substituted in)	17 (substituted in)	—	3	0	0	0
Marco Kruger	4	5	7	7		18 (substituted in)	—	5	0	0	0
Joe van der Hoogt	5						—	1	0	0	0
Martin Sithole	6	6	8	8	7	6	—	6	4	0	20
Vincent Maruping	7	7	6	6		7	—	5	3	0	15
Nicky Steyn (c)	8	8					—	2	1	0	5
Boela Abrahams	9	9	9	9	9	9	—	6	2	0	10
Franna du Toit	10	10	10	10	21	10	—	5	1	26	31
Enver Brandt	11	11	11	11	11	11	—	6	2	0	10
Japie Nel	12	12	12	12	12	12	—	6	0	0	0
Vuyo Mbotho	13	13	13	13	13	13	—	6	3	0	15
Norman Nelson	14	14	14	14			—	4	1	0	5
Nico Scheepers	15	15	15	15	14	14	—	6	2	35	45
Marco Klopper	16 (substituted in)	2	16 (substituted in)	2	16 (substituted in)	16 (substituted in)	—	6	1	0	5
Danie van der Merwe	17 (substituted in)	17 (substituted in)	1	1	1	3	—	6	3	0	15
Boela Serfontein	18 (substituted in)						—	1	1	0	5
Frans Sisita	19 (substituted in)	19 (substituted in)				21 (substituted in)	—	3	1	0	5
Sino Nyoka	20 (substituted in)	20 (substituted in)	20 (substituted in)	20 (substituted in)	20 (substituted in)	20 (substituted in)	—	6	0	0	0
Wynand Pienaar	21 (substituted in)	21 (substituted in)	21 (substituted in)		15	15	—	5	2	2	12
Tertius Maarman	22 (substituted in)	22 (substituted in)	22 (substituted in)	22 (substituted in)	22 (substituted in)	22 (substituted in)	—	6	0	0	0
Chris Ehlers		4	4	4	4	4	—	5	0	0	0
Hennie Venter		16					—	0	0	0	0
Ockie van Zyl		18 (substituted in)	5	5	5	5	—	5	0	0	0
Gerard Baard			17 (substituted in)	17 (substituted in)	3	1	—	4	0	0	0
Jan Breedt			18 (substituted in)	18 (substituted in)	18 (substituted in)		—	3	0	0	0
Boetie Groenewald			19 (substituted in)	19 (substituted in)	6	19 (substituted in)	—	4	1	0	5
Coenie van Wyk				21 (substituted in)	10		—	2	2	3	13
Dirk Grobbelaar					8	8	—	2	0	0	0
Pieter Matthews					19 (substituted in)		—	1	0	0	0
Total								6	31	63	218

Leopards
Name	SWD	BOL	GRF	BDR	GFA	SF	F	App	Try	Kck	Pts
Joe Smith	1	1	1	17 (substituted in)	1	1	1	7	2	0	10
Dane van der Westhuyzen	2	2	2	16 (substituted in)	2	2	2	7	2	0	10
John-Roy Jenkinson	3	3	3	3	3	3	3	7	2	0	10
Robert Kruger	4	18	4	18 (substituted in)	4	4	4	6	1	0	5
Stairs Mhlongo	5	4	18 (substituted in)	4	18 (substituted in)			5	0	0	0
Juan Language (c)	6	6	6	19 (substituted in)	6	6	6	7	7	0	35
Loftus Morrison	7	7	7	7	7	7	7	7	1	0	5
Marno Redelinghuys	8	8	8	8	8	8	8	7	0	0	0
Malherbe Swart	9	9	9	9	9	9	9	7	1	0	5
Johnny Welthagen	10	21 (substituted in)						2	0	0	0
Tyler Fisher	11	11	11	13	11	11	11	7	5	0	25
Adriaan Engelbrecht	12	12	12	21	12	12	12	7	1	80	85
Adrian Vermeulen	13	13	13	12	13	13	13	7	2	0	10
Rowayne Beukman	14		21 (substituted in)					2	0	0	0
Rhyno Smith	15	15	15	15	15	15	15	7	4	5	25
Wilmar Arnoldi	16 (substituted in)	16 (substituted in)	16 (substituted in)	2	16 (substituted in)	16 (substituted in)	16 (substituted in)	7	1	0	5
Bart le Roux	17 (substituted in)	17 (substituted in)	17 (substituted in)	1	17 (substituted in)	17	17 (substituted in)	6	2	0	10
Francois Robertse	18 (substituted in)	5	5	5	5	5	18 (substituted in)	7	3	0	15
Jaco Jordaan	19 (substituted in)	19 (substituted in)	19 (substituted in)	6	19 (substituted in)	19 (substituted in)	19 (substituted in)	7	0	0	0
Hanco Venter	20 (substituted in)	20 (substituted in)						2	0	0	0
Warren Gilbert	21 (substituted in)							1	0	0	0
Lucian Cupido	22 (substituted in)	22 (substituted in)	22 (substituted in)	11	21 (substituted in)	21	22	5	1	0	5
Schalk Hugo		10	10	10	10	10	10	6	3	6	21
Damian Engledoe		14	14	22 (substituted in)	14	14	14	6	1	0	5
Tiaan Dorfling			20 (substituted in)	20 (substituted in)	20 (substituted in)			3	0	2	2
Sizo Maseko				14	22 (substituted in)	22 (substituted in)		3	0	0	0
Walt Steenkamp						18 (substituted in)	5	2	0	0	0
Percy Williams						20 (substituted in)	20 (substituted in)	2	0	0	0
Jaco Hayward							21 (substituted in)	2	0	0	0
Total								7	39	93	288

SWD Eagles
Name	LEO	GFA	BDR	BOL	GRF	SF	F	App	Try	Kck	Pts
Layle Delo	1	17 (substituted in)	16 (substituted in)					3	0	0	0
Marius Fourie	2	2		16 (substituted in)	2	2	2	6	0	0	0
Dean Hopp	3	19 (substituted in)	3	17 (substituted in)	17 (substituted in)	17 (substituted in)	17 (substituted in)	7	0	0	0
Peet van der Walt	4		4	4		4		4	0	0	0
Grant le Roux	5	4	5	5	5	5	5	7	1	0	5
Wayne Khan	6	6	19 (substituted in)	6		6	6	6	1	0	5
Davon Raubenheimer (c)	7	7	7	7		7	7	6	0	0	0
Zandré Jordaan	8			20 (substituted in)	8	8	8	5	1	0	5
Johan Steyn	9	9	20 (substituted in)	21 (substituted in)	20 (substituted in)	9	9	7	0	0	0
Martin du Toit	10	10	12			10	10	5	1	0	5
Charles Radebe	11		14	14	14	14	14	6	5	0	25
Luzuko Vulindlu	12	12	13	12	12	12	12	7	2	0	10
Kirsten Heyns	13	13						2	0	0	0
Clinton Wagman	14	14						2	1	0	5
Leighton Eksteen	15	15	10	10	10	15	15	7	2	92	102
Kurt Haupt	16 (substituted in)	16 (substituted in)	2	2	16 (substituted in)	16 (substituted in)	16 (substituted in)	7	2	0	10
Pieter Stemmet	17 (substituted in)	3	17 (substituted in)	3	3	3	3	7	1	0	5
Juandré Digue	18 (substituted in)	1	1	1	1	1	1	7	0	0	0
Mzwanele Zito	19 (substituted in)	5			18 (substituted in)	18 (substituted in)	4	5	0	0	0
Christo du Plessis	20 (substituted in)		8			20 (substituted in)	20 (substituted in)	4	0	0	0
Dillin Snel	21 (substituted in)	21 (substituted in)	9			21 (substituted in)	21 (substituted in)	5	1	0	5
Daniel Roberts	22 (substituted in)	22 (substituted in)	15	15	15	22 (substituted in)	22	6	0	0	0
Lyndon Hartnick		8	18 (substituted in)	19 (substituted in)	19 (substituted in)			4	0	0	0
Alshaun Bock		11	11	11	11	11	11	6	4	0	20
Schalk Oelofse		18 (substituted in)		18 (substituted in)	4		18 (substituted in)	4	1	0	5
Buran Parks		20 (substituted in)	6		6			3	0	0	0
Tom Kean			21 (substituted in)	22 (substituted in)	21 (substituted in)			3	0	2	2
Brian Skosana			22 (substituted in)	13	13	13	13	5	4	0	20
Andisa Ntsila				8	7	19 (substituted in)	19 (substituted in)	4	1	0	5
Mzo Dyantyi				9	9			2	0	0	0
Creswin Josephs					22 (substituted in)			1	0	0	0
Total								7	28	94	234

For each team, (c) denotes the team captain. For each match, the player's squad number is shown. Starting players are numbered 1 to 15, while the replacements are numbered 16 to 22. If a replacement made an appearance in the match, it is indicated by (substituted in) . "App" refers to the number of appearances made by the player, "Try" to the number of tries scored by the player, "Kck" to the number of points scored via kicks (conversions, penalties or drop goals) and "Pts" refer to the total number of points scored by the player.

=== Discipline ===
The following table contains all the cards handed out during the tournament:

Sendings-off and multiple sin-binnings
Player	Team	Sent off (straight red)	Temporarily suspended
Clinton Wagman	SWD Eagles	1	0

Single sin-binnings
Player	Team	Sent off (straight red)	Temporarily suspended
Lukhanyo Am	Border Bulldogs	0	1
Gavin Annandale	Boland Cavaliers	0	1
Riaan Arends	Falcons	0	1
Onke Dubase	Border Bulldogs	0	1
Chris Ehlers	Griffons	0	1
Boetie Groenewald	Griffons	0	1
Wayne Khan	SWD Eagles	0	1
Marco Klopper	Griffons	0	1
Robert Kruger	Leopards	0	1
Juan Language	Leopards	0	1
Loftus Morrison	Leopards	0	1
Siyamthanda Ngande	Border Bulldogs	0	1
Buran Parks	SWD Eagles	0	1
Wynand Pienaar	Griffons	0	1
Charles Radebe	SWD Eagles	0	1
Brian Skosana	SWD Eagles	0	1
Rhyno Smith	Leopards	0	1
Malherbe Swart	Leopards	0	1
Coenie van Wyk	Griffons	0	1
Gerrit van Wyk	Boland Cavaliers	0	1
Adrian Vermeulen	Leopards	0	1
Wayne Wilschut	Boland Cavaliers	0	1
Yanga Xakalashe	Border Bulldogs	0	1
* Legend: (red card) = Sent off, (yellow card) = Sin-binned

== Referees ==
The following referees officiated matches in the 2015 Currie Cup First Division:

2015 Currie Cup First Division referees
Referees	Rodney Boneparte • Ben Crouse • Stephan Geldenhuys • Quinton Immelman • AJ Jacobs • Cwengile Jadezweni • Pro Legoete • Rasta Rasivhenge

== See also ==
- 2015 Currie Cup Premier Division
- 2015 Currie Cup qualification
- 2015 Vodacom Cup
- 2015 Under-21 Provincial Championship Group A
- 2015 Under-21 Provincial Championship Group B
- 2015 Under-19 Provincial Championship Group A
- 2015 Under-19 Provincial Championship Group B
