= Leighton Eksteen =

- Born: 15 September 1994 (age 32) Riversdale, South Africa
- Height: 1.70 m (5 ft 7 in)
- Weight: 67 kg (148 lb; 10 st 8 lb)
- School: Hoërskool Outeniqua, George

Rugby union career
- Position: Fullback / Fly-half / Scrum-half
- Current team: VVA Saracens
Youth career
- 2012–2015: SWD Eagles
Senior career
Years	Team	Apps	(Points)
2014–2019	SWD Eagles	71	(398)
2016	Southern Kings	5	(0)
2019–present	VVA Saracens	1	(0)
- Correct as of 30 July 2019

Leighton Eksteen (born 15 September 1994 in Riversdale, South Africa) is a South African rugby union player for VVA Podmoskovje in the Professional Rugby League in Russia. He is a utility back that can play as a fullback, fly-half or scrum-half.

== Playing career ==
=== Youth rugby and SWD Eagles ===
In 2012, Eksteen was selected to represent the George-based SWD Eagles at the premier South African rugby union competition for high schools, the Under-18 Craven Week, held in Port Elizabeth, scoring a try in their 33–39 defeat to Western Province.

He joined the SWD Academy after leaving school and made four appearances for the SWD U19s in the 2013 Under-19 Provincial Championship. He made just four appearances for them in the competition – three starts and one appearance off the bench – but was their top scorer in the competition with 76 points. That placed him as the third-highest points scorer in Group B of the competition. He scored six tries in his four appearances, which included a hat-trick in their match against the Pumas U19s, which saw him score 30 of his side's points in a 55–12 victory. The SWD U19 side qualified for the semi-finals of the competition, but Eksteen didn't feature in their 24–29 defeat to the Falcons U19 in their semi-final match.

He was included in the SWD U21 squad that participated in the 2014 Under-21 Provincial Championship. However, he just in just two matches against Limpopo Blue Bulls U21 and Griffons U21 – scoring 21 points through one try and eight conversions in the latter match – before being joining the SWD Eagles' senior squad for the 2014 Currie Cup First Division. He made his first class debut as the SWD Eagles' starting fly-half in a 19–24 defeat to the Falcons in Kempton Park. After also starting their 31–22 victory over the Border Bulldogs in George, he scored his first senior points in their next match, scoring a try shortly before half-time in a 24–35 defeat at home to the Boland Cavaliers. He appeared as a replacement in their 42–27 victory over the Griffons in Welkom in their final match of the regular season, as well as in their 43–45 defeat to the same opposition in the semi-finals a week later. With the senior side's season over, he rejoined the Under-21 side that reached the final of Group B of the Under-21 Provincial Championship, starting the match and scoring his side's only points as the Eastern Province U21s won the match 46–3.

Despite still being eligible to represent SWD at Under-21 level in 2015, he exclusively played for the senior side. He played off the bench in all eight of their 2015 Vodacom Cup matches. Eksteen scored one try in their defeat to Western Province as his side finished in fourth position on the Southern Section log to qualify for the quarter finals, where they lost to the Golden Lions. He appeared in all six of their matches during the 2015 Currie Cup qualification series – showing his versatility as he twice started as a scrum-half, twice started as a fullback and twice played off the bench – and again contributed a single try during the competition, in a 19–13 victory over the Border Bulldogs. However, that was his side's only victory in the competition as they finished bottom of the log and qualifying to play in the 2015 Currie Cup First Division competition. Eksteen was handed the kicking duties during this competition and it coincided with a big turnaround in fortunes, as the SWD Eagles won four out of their five matches, to finish in third spot on the log to qualify for the semi-finals. Eksteen contributed 102 points in these five matches to not only be the SWD Eagles' top scorer in the competition, but also the overall top scorer, ahead of champions Leopards' Adriaan Engelbrecht. His best points haul during the competition came in a 47–40 victory over the Griffons in the semi-final, as he scored one try, two conversions and six penalties to contribute 27 points and help the SWD Eagles reach their first final since 2010. He kicked ten points in the final, but it was not enough, as the Leopards ran out 44–20 winners.

=== Southern Kings ===
At the start of 2016, Eksteen was one of two SWD Eagles players that joined the Southern Kings' Super Rugby squad for a trial period as they prepared for the 2016 Super Rugby season.

=== VVA Podmoskovye ===
In 2019, Eksteen joined the Russian team VVA Podmoskovye (ex. VVA Saracens). In the Russian Rugby Cup 2021, he became the top scorer of the tournament, gaining 36 points.

=== Statistics ===
First class career
Season	Teams	Currie Cup First Division		Currie Cup qualification		Vodacom Cup		Total	
Season	Teams	Apps	Pts	Apps	Pts	Apps	Pts	Apps	Pts
2014	SWD Eagles	5	5	—	—	—	—	5	5
2015	SWD Eagles	7	102	6	5	8	5	21	112
2014–present	SWD Eagles Total	12	107	6	5	8	5	26	117
2014–present	Career Total	12	107	6	5	8	5	26	117
