= Zwart =

Zwart is a Dutch surname meaning "black". It may refer to:

- Adrianus Zwart (1903–1981), Dutch artist
- Harald Zwart (born 1965), Dutch-Norwegian film director
- Frans Zwart (1877–1937), Dutch organist
- Henk Zwart (1924–2012), Dutch geologist and petrographer
- Jeff Zwart (born 1955), American commercial film director
- Piet Zwart (1885–1977), Dutch photographer, typographer, and industrial designer
- Tamara Zwart (born 1975), Dutch synchronized swimmer
- Willem Hendrik Zwart (1925–1997), Dutch organist

== See also ==
- De Zwart
- Swart
- Zwarts
- Zwarte
