= Robert Kruger =

South African rugby union player

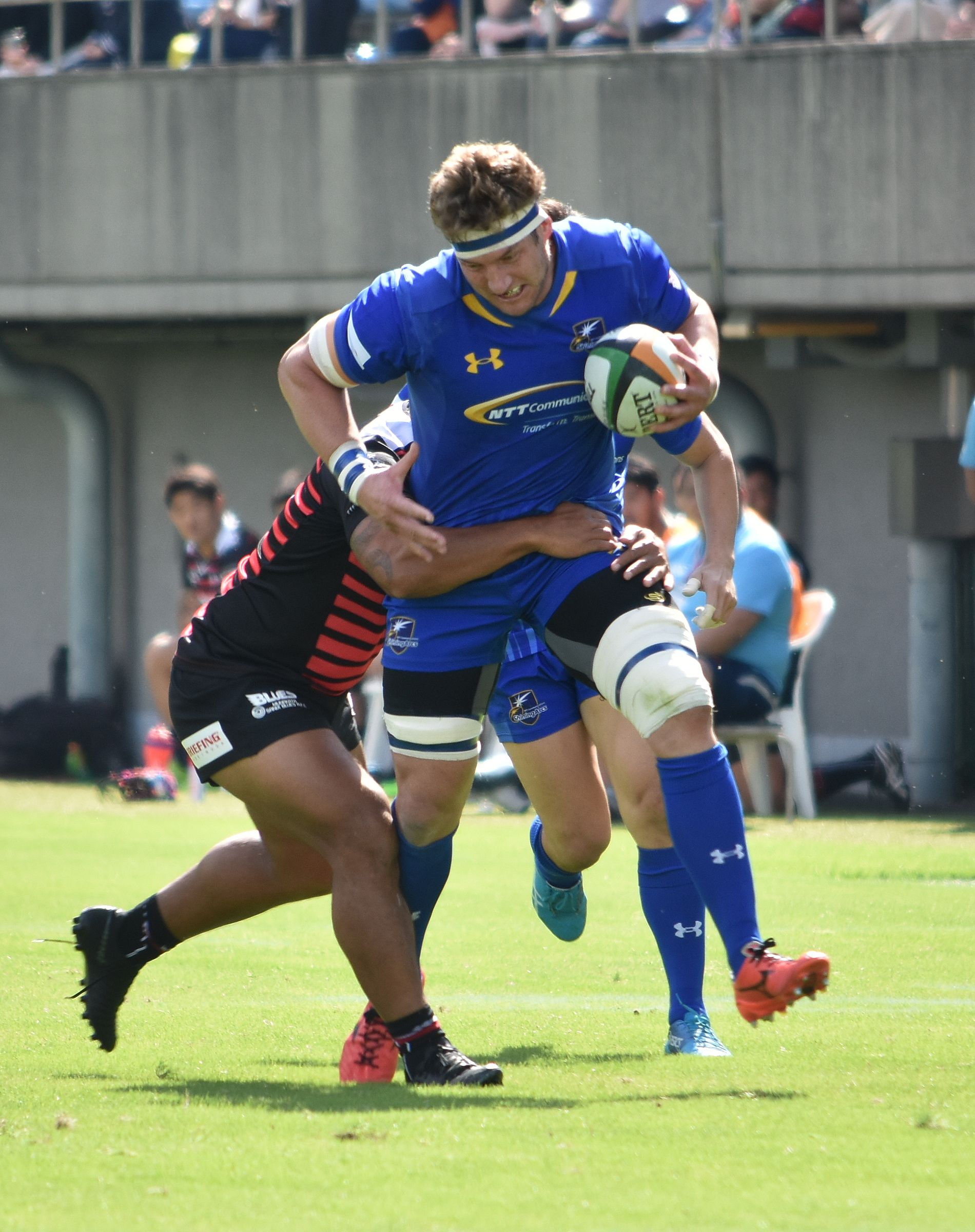
- Full name: Robert Albertus Kruger
- Born: 28 April 1988 (age 38) Johannesburg, South Africa
- Height: 1.92 m (6 ft 3 1/2 in)
- Weight: 105 kg (16 st 7 lb; 231 lb)
- School: Standerton High School, Standerton
- University: North-West University

Rugby union career
- Position: Flanker / Number 8 / Lock
- Current team: Leopards
Youth career
- 2004–2006: Pumas
- 2007–2008: Leopards
- 2009: Golden Lions
Senior career
Years	Team	Apps	(Points)
2009–2011	Golden Lions XV	5	(5)
2009–2010	Golden Lions	4	(0)
2009–2010	Lions	9	(0)
2011–2015	Leopards	48	(20)
2013–2014	Leopards XV	13	(10)
2015–2019	Lions	25	(0)
2016–2018	Golden Lions XV	16	(0)
2017	Golden Lions	9	(5)
2018–2020	NTT Communications Shining Arcs	13	(10)
2021	Toyota Industries Shuttles	6	(10)
2022–	Leopards		
- Correct as of 3 April 2022

Robert Albertus Kruger (born 28 April 1988 in Johannesburg, South Africa) is a South African rugby union player for NTT Communications Shining Arcs in the Top League in Japan. His regular position is a flanker, but he has occasionally played as a lock or number eight.

== Career ==
=== Youth ===
Playing his schoolboy rugby for Standerton High School, Kruger was included in several youth tournaments for his provincial side, the Mpumalanga Pumas, playing at the 2004 Under-16 Grant Khomo Week, at the 2005 Under-18 Academy Week and the 2006 Under-18 Craven Week tournaments.

At the start of 2007, Kruger joined Potchefstroom-based side the Leopards. He played for the Leopards U19 team in the 2007 Under-19 Provincial Championship and for the Leopards U21 team in the 2008 Under-21 Provincial Championship.

=== Golden Lions ===
In 2009, Kruger moved to Johannesburg to join the Golden Lions. He made his first class debut for them during the 2009 Vodacom Cup competition, starting their match in Potchefstroom against former side the Leopards. Six days later, he started their match against the Blue Bulls in Pretoria and scored the opening try of the match, but could not prevent the Golden Lions suffering a 20–19 defeat.

With just the two first class matches behind his name, Kruger was drafted into the Lions Super 14 squad for the 2009 Super 14 season and included in their touring squad that travelled to Australasia. He made his Super Rugby debut on New Zealand soil in a match against the Blues in Auckland, coming off the bench on the hour mark. Despite getting sin-binned in their next match, a 31–20 victory against the Reds in Brisbane, Kruger was promoted to the starting line-up for the first time the following week against the Force in Perth. Upon their return to South Africa, Kruger made a further two starts and one appearance off the bench.

He made his Currie Cup debut in July of the same year, coming off the bench against the Bulls in Pretoria.

=== Leopards ===
However, he failed to establish himself as a regular for the Golden Lions, either domestically or in the Super Rugby, and returned to Potchefstroom to rejoin the Leopards prior to the 2011 Currie Cup First Division season. There, he immediately established himself in the first team in both the Vodacom Cup and Currie Cup competitions.

He was once again called up to the Lions Super Rugby side for their 2015 Super Rugby season. He played off the bench for the Lions in their first match of the season in an 8–22 loss to the Hurricanes to make his first appearance in the competition after a four-season absence.

He was a member of the Leopards team that won the 2015 Currie Cup First Division. He featured in a total of twelve matches during the 2015 Currie Cup qualification rounds and First Division proper and scored two tries for the side. He also started the final, where he helped the Leopards to a 44–20 victory over the SWD Eagles to win the competition for the first time in their history.

He was named the Leopards' Player of the Year for 2015, the second time he received this accolade.
