= Tyler Fisher =

South African rugby union player

- Full name: Tyler Luke Fisher
- Born: 19 November 1993 (age 32) Westville
- Height: 1.90 m (6 ft 3 in)
- Weight: 107 kg (16 st 12 lb; 236 lb)
- School: Westville Boys' High School

Rugby union career
- Position: Centre
- Current team: Utah Warriors
Youth career
- 2009–2014: Sharks
Amateur team(s)
Years	Team	Apps	(Points)
2018-19	West Harbour RFC		
Senior career
Years	Team	Apps	(Points)
2020	Utah Warriors		
- Correct as of 3 November 2018
Provincial / State sides
Years	Team	Apps	(Points)
2013-15	Sharks XV	9	(15)
2015	→Leopards	10	(35)
2016-17	Pumas	16	(30)
2017-2018	SWD Eagles	27	(40)
International career
Years	Team	Apps	(Points)
2013	South Africa Under-20		
- Correct as of 13 July 2015

Tyler Luke Fisher (born 19 November 1993) is a South African rugby union player who plays centre for the Utah Warriors in Major League Rugby (MLR).

He previously played for West Harbour RFC in the Shute Shield in Australia.

== Career ==
=== Youth level ===
He represented Sharks at various youth levels, from the Under-16 Grant Khomo Week in 2009 to the 2012 Under-19 Provincial Championship.

=== Sharks ===
He made his provincial first class debut for Sharks in their Vodacom Cup match against the Border Bulldogs.

=== Leopards ===
He was a member of the Leopards team that won the 2015 Currie Cup First Division. He featured in a total of ten matches during the 2015 Currie Cup qualification rounds and First Division proper and scored seven tries for the side. He also started the final, where he helped the Leopards to a 44–20 victory over the SWD Eagles to win the competition for the first time in their history.

=== Pumas ===
He moved to the Nelspruit-based Pumas prior to the 2016 season.

=== S.A. Under-20 ===
He was included in the training group that toured Argentina in preparation for the 2013 IRB Junior World Championship.
