= Juan Language =

South African rugby union player (born 1989)

- Full name: Juan Michael Language
- Born: 19 April 1989 (age 37) Port Elizabeth, South Africa
- Height: 1.83 m (6 ft 0 in)
- Weight: 97 kg (15 st 4 lb; 214 lb)
- School: Hoërskool Framesby, Port Elizabeth

Rugby union career
- Position: Flanker / Number eight
Youth career
- 2007: Eastern Province Kings
- 2010: Sharks
Amateur team(s)
Years	Team	Apps	(Points)
2013	College Rovers	5	(0)
2014	NWU Pukke	7	(10)
Senior career
Years	Team	Apps	(Points)
2014–2018	Leopards	42	(95)
2015	Leopards XV	8	(10)
- Correct as of 24 May 2018

Juan Michael Language (born 19 April 1989 in Port Elizabeth, South Africa) is a South African rugby union player who last played for the Leopards. He can play as a flanker or a number eight.

== Career ==
=== Youth, club and varsity rugby ===
He played high school rugby for Hoërskool Framesby in his hometown of Port Elizabeth. In 2007, he was selected to represent an Eastern Province Under-18 side at the Academy Week tournament.

While at Framesby, Language also played sevens rugby. In January 2007, he took part in a high school sevens tournament involving schools from across the Eastern Cape and from Gauteng. He helped Framesby win the competition and was also named Player of the Tournament.

He moved to Durban, where he joined the Sharks academy. In 2010, he played for the Sharks U21 side in the 2010 Under-21 Provincial Competition, making three appearances off the bench.

Between 2011 and 2013, he played club rugby for Durban-based club side College Rovers. In 2012, College Rovers won the KwaZulu-Natal Rugby Union's premier club competition, the Moor Cup, which meant they qualified to the inaugural SARU Community Cup competition in 2013. Language was a regular starter for College Rovers in the competition, playing in all four matches during the pool stages, in their quarter-final match against Durbanville-Bellville and, after sitting out the semi-final, he started in the Final of the competition against Eastern Cape side Despatch. College Rovers fell just short in the final, losing the match 26–24 with Language playing the full 80 minutes.

Prior to the 2014 season, College Rovers head coach Robert du Preez was appointed as the coach of Potchefstroom-based provincial union the Leopards, as well as university side the NWU Pukke. Language was among a number of players that followed Du Preez to North West Province. He featured prominently for NWU Pukke during the 2014 Varsity Cup tournament, starting seven of their nine matches during the competition as they reached the final of the competition for only the second time. He also played in the final, as the Pukke lost the match in dramatic fashion; they were leading 33–15 with five minutes left to play, but allowed the UCT Ikey Tigers to score three late tries to win the match 39–33 and win their second Varsity Cup title.

=== Leopards ===
Language's performances during the 2014 Varsity Cup led to his inclusion in the Leopards squad for the 2014 Currie Cup qualification competition. Despite no first class appearances to his name, he was also named vice-captain for the competition.

He made his first class debut on 7 June 2014 against the SWD Eagles at Olën Park, Potchefstroom. He had an immediate and significant impact in the match and scored two tries either side of half-time to help the Leopards to a 51–23 victory. He continued his scoring streak in the next match as he scored a try against the Falcons in Kempton Park to send the Leopards top of the log.

He was the captain of the Leopards team that won the 2015 Currie Cup First Division. He featured in a total of thirteen matches during the 2015 Currie Cup qualification rounds and First Division proper and scored seven tries for the side to be the top try scorer during the second round of fixtures. He also scored two of the Leopards' tries in the final, helping them to a 44–20 victory over the SWD Eagles to win the competition for the first time in their history.
