= Friedle Olivier =

- Born: 27 May 1992 (age 34) Pretoria, South Africa
- Height: 1.96 m (6 ft 5 in)
- Weight: 116 kg (18 st 4 lb; 256 lb)
- School: Hoërskool Dr Johan Jurgens, Springs
- University: University of South Africa

Rugby union career
- Position: Number eight / Flanker / Lock
- Current team: Mitsubishi Dynaboars
Youth career
- 2010–2013: Falcons
Senior career
Years	Team	Apps	(Points)
2013–2019	Falcons	85	(165)
2020–2022	Enisei-STM	30	(115)
2022–2025	Cheetahs	13	(5)
2023–2025	Free State Cheetahs		
2025–	Mitsubishi Dynaboars	11	(0)
- Correct as of 20 June 2022

Friedle Olivier (born 27 May 1992) is a professional South African rugby union player for the Enisei-STM in the Rugby Premier League. His regular position is as a number eight, but he played as a flanker and a lock earlier in his career.

== Career ==
Olivier earned his first provincial selection when he was included in the Blue Falcons side that played at the Under-18 Academy Week tournament in 2010. After high school, he fell in with the Falcons' youth structures and made five appearances for the Falcons U19 side in Group B of the 2011 Under-19 Provincial Championship, helping them reach the semi-finals of the competition.

In 2012, he made three starts for the Falcons U21s in the 2012 Under-21 Provincial Championship, scoring two tries in their match against Griffons U21s in a 31–27 victory.

He was included in the Falcons' senior squad for the 2013 Vodacom Cup and made his first class debut by starting their Round One 0–62 defeat to the Pumas in Nelspruit. He also started their next match – as they bounced back to beat the Golden Lions 27–22 in Kempton Park – and their Round Three match against the Leopards XV in Potchefstroom, which saw Olivier score his first senior try halfway through the first half in a 16–47 defeat. He appeared as a replacement in their remaining four matches of the competition as they finished in seventh position on the Northern Section log to miss out on a quarter final berth.

His Currie Cup debut came in August 2013; this also happened in Nelspruit in a match against the Pumas as he came on as a late replacement in a 12–69 defeat. He made one more Currie Cup appearance in their match against the Griffons in Welkom, but spent the majority of the season playing for and captaining the Falcons U21s in the 2013 Under-21 Provincial Championship. He started all seven of their matches and scored eight tries; he scored in six of their matches and got two tries against both Griquas U21 and the Pumas U21s to finish the season as the Falcons U21s' top scorer.

He made six appearances in the 2014 Vodacom Cup as the Falcons won one match out of seven to finish in seventh position on the Northern Section and a further three appearances in the 2014 Currie Cup qualification competition, where teams competed for a spot in the 2014 Currie Cup Premier Division. The Falcons finished in sixth spot to remain in the 2014 Currie Cup First Division. Olivier made three appearances in the Currie Cup First Division, including his first Currie Cup start in their 36–27 victory over the Griffons, a match which also saw Olivier score his first try in the Currie Cup competition in the final ten minutes of the match. The Falcons finished fourth on the log to qualify for the semi-finals; Olivier was not involved in their 31–24 victory over a Leopards team that finished top of the log or the final, where the Falcons lost 21–23 to the Griffons in Welkom.

Olivier made four starts for the Falcons in the 2015 Vodacom Cup competition and contributed tries in their matches against the Pumas, Namibian side Welwitschias and the Limpopo Blue Bulls to help the Falcons finish in fifth spot, narrowly missing out on a quarter final spot. He made five appearances for them in the 2015 Currie Cup qualification competition where they again fell short, finishing in third spot on the log despite Olivier tries in their matches against the SWD Eagles and the Griffons. He started their 2015 Currie Cup First Division campaign in fine style, scoring two tries in their 48–27 victory over the Border Bulldogs in the first match of the competition.

== Statistics ==
As of 26 June 2022

First class career
Season	Teams	Currie Cup First Div		Vodacom Cup		Other		Total	
Season	Teams	Apps	Pts	Apps	Pts	Apps	Pts	Apps	Pts
2013	Falcons	2	0	7	5	—	—	9	5
2014	Falcons	6	5	5	0	—	—	11	5
2015	Falcons	7	20	3	15	—	—	10	35
2016	Falcons	5	15	—	—	6	—	11	15
2017	Falcons	8	15	—	—	7	10	15	25
2018	Falcons	8	35	—	—	7	10	15	45
2019	Falcons	7	20	—	—	7	15	14	35
Career Total		43	110	15	20	27	35	85	165
Season	Teams	Russian Championship		Russian Cup		European Super Cup		Total	
Season	Teams	Apps	Pts	Apps	Pts	Apps	Pts	Apps	Pts
2020	Enisei-STM	—	—	2	—	—	—	2	—
2021	Enisei-STM	14	35	2	15	4	30	20	80
2022	Enisei-STM	8	35	—	—	—	—	8	35
Career Total		22	70	4	15	4	30	30	115

=== Honours ===
- Russian Championships (2): 2020-21, 2021–22
- Russian Cup (2): 2020, 2021
- Nikolaev Cup (2): 2021, 2022
