= 2015 Under-19 Provincial Championship Group B =

- Countries: South Africa
- Date: 15 August – 8 October 2015
- Champions: Griffons U19
- Runners-up: Pumas U19
- Promoted: None
- Matches played: 31
- Tries scored: 244 (average 7.9 per match)
- Top point scorer: Luan James (69)
- Top try scorer: Ian Truter (13)

The 2015 Under-19 Provincial Championship Group B was contested from 15 August to 8 October 2015. The tournament (also known as the ABSA Under-19 Provincial Championship for sponsorship reasons) was the second tier of the 2015 edition of the Under-19 Provincial Championship, an annual Under-19 inter-provincial rugby union competition featuring fifteen South African provincial unions.

The tournament was won by the Griffons U19s; they beat the Pumas U19 24–21 in the final played on 8 October 2015.

The 2015 season was the final season that the smaller provincial unions competed at Under-19 level; from 2016, the Under-19 and Under-21 championships would be merged into a single Under-20 Provincial Championship.

== Competition rules and information ==
There were eight participating teams in the 2015 Under-19 Provincial Championship Group B. These teams played each other once over the course of the season, either at home or away.

Teams received four points for a win and two points for a draw. Bonus points were awarded to teams that scored four or more tries in a game, as well as to teams that lost a match by seven points or less. Teams were ranked by log points, then points difference (points scored less points conceded).

The top four teams qualified for the title play-off semi-finals. The team that finished first had home advantage against the team that finished fourth, while the team that finished second had home advantage against the team that finished third. The final was played as a curtain raiser for the 2015 Currie Cup First Division final.

== Teams ==
Location of teams in the 2015 Under-19 Provincial Championship Group B

The following teams took part in the 2015 Under-19 Provincial Championship Group B competition:

2015 Under-19 Provincial Championship Group B teams
Team name	Stadium
Boland U19	Boland Stadium, Wellington
Border U19	Buffalo City Stadium, East London
Falcons U19	Barnard Stadium, Kempton Park
Griffons U19	HT Pelatona Projects Stadium, Welkom
Griquas U19	Griqua Park, Kimberley
Limpopo Blue Bulls U19	Peter Mokaba Stadium, Polokwane
Pumas U19	Mbombela Stadium, Mbombela
SWD U19	Outeniqua Park, George

== Standings ==
The final league standings for the 2015 Under-19 Provincial Championship Group B were: (Note: The scorers for the Griquas v Border match are unknown and therefore excluded from the scorers list. Griquas scored 12 tries in the match and Border scored one try.)

2015 Under-19 Provincial Championship Group B standings
Pos	Team	P	W	D	L	PF	PA	PD	TF	TA	TB	LB	Pts
1	Pumas U19	7	6	0	1	250	124	+126	38	17	5	1	30
2	Griffons U19	7	6	0	1	185	128	+57	25	17	4	0	28
3	Griquas U19	7	5	0	2	273	126	+147	40	18	5	1	26
4	Falcons U19	7	4	0	3	186	147	+39	29	22	4	0	20
5	Boland U19	7	4	0	3	216	214	+2	34	33	4	0	20
6	Limpopo Blue Bulls U19	7	2	0	5	194	231	−37	28	34	4	2	14
7	SWD U19	7	1	0	6	131	265	−134	21	41	2	2	8
8	Border U19	7	0	0	7	100	300	−200	13	46	1	1	2

Legend and competition rules
Legend:
Top four teams qualified to the semi-finals.	P = Games played, W = Games won, D = Games drawn, L = Games lost, PF = Points for, PA = Points against, PD = Points difference, TF = Tries for, TA = Tries against, TB = Try bonus points, LB = Losing bonus points, Pts = Log points
Competition rules:
Play-offs: The top four teams qualified to the semi-finals, with the higher-placed team having home advantage. Points breakdown: * 4 points for a win * 2 points for a draw * 1 bonus point for a loss by seven points or less * 1 bonus point for scoring four or more tries in a match

=== Round-by-round ===
The table below shows each team's progression throughout the season. For each round, their cumulative points total is shown with the overall log position in brackets:

Team Progression – 2015 Under-19 Provincial Championship Group B
Team	R1	R2	R3	R4	R5	R6	R7	Semi	Final
Pumas U19	5 (1st)	10 (1st)	15 (1st)	20 (1st)	25 (1st)	29 (1st)	30 (1st)	Won	Lost
Griffons U19	4 (3rd)	4 (6th)	9 (5th)	14 (3rd)	19 (2nd)	24 (2nd)	28 (2nd)	Won	Won
Griquas U19	1 (5th)	6 (4th)	11 (3rd)	16 (2nd)	16 (3rd)	21 (3rd)	26 (3rd)	Lost	—
Falcons U19	0 (8th)	5 (5th)	5 (6th)	10 (5th)	15 (4th)	15 (4th)	20 (4th)	Lost	—
Boland U19	4 (4th)	9 (2nd)	10 (4th)	10 (6th)	10 (6th)	15 (5th)	20 (5th)	—	—
Limpopo Blue Bulls U19	5 (2nd)	7 (3rd)	12 (2nd)	12 (4th)	13 (5th)	14 (6th)	14 (6th)	—	—
SWD U19	1 (6th)	1 (8th)	1 (8th)	3 (7th)	8 (7th)	0 (7th)	0 (7th)	—	—
Border U19	1 (7th)	1 (7th)	1 (7th)	1 (8th)	1 (8th)	1 (8th)	2 (8th)	—	—
Key:	win	draw	loss	bye					

== Fixtures and results ==
The following matches were played in the 2015 Under-19 Provincial Championship Group B:

=== Round one ===
14 August 2015	SWD U19	19–24	Limpopo Blue Bulls U19	Outeniqua Park, George
14:30	Try: Justin Williams 16'; Clayton Kiewitz 41'; Caae-Jay Ferendale 58'; Con: Nathan Kemp 42', 59' (2/3); Pen: Caae-Jay Ferendale (0/1); Nathan Kemp (0/1)	Report; Scoreboard	Try: Christiaan Wessels 3'; Branley Odendaal 35'; Heinrich du Plessis 53'; Dean Steinberg 65'; Con: Christiaan Wessels (0/2); Jeandré Rossouw 54', 66' (2/2)	Attendance: 250; Referee: Egon Seconds

14 August 2015	Border U19	12–18	Griffons U19	Buffalo City Stadium, East London
17:30	Pen: Justin Opperman 17', 25', 31', 42' (4/4)	Report; Scoreboard	Try: Siya Ngxesha 37'; Domenic Smit 61'; Con: André Potgieter 62' (1/2); Pen: Domenic Smit (0/3); André Potgieter 28', 48' (2/4)	Referee: Jacques Nieuwenhuis

15 August 2015	Falcons U19	31–39	Pumas U19	Barnard Stadium, Kempton Park
11:30	Try: Stephen Pelser 13'; Karabo Makotane 19'; Henning Buitendag 42'; Ruan Kotze 51'; Bercho Botha 62'; Con: Conrad Engelbrecht 43', 52', 63' (3/5); Cards: Willem Dreyer (yellow card) 29' to 37'	Report; Scoreboard	Try: Ruben Opperman 30'; Ian Truter 32', 57'; Kobus Coetzee 34'; André Mathews 46'; Con: Jean Els 31', 35', 47', 58' (4/5); Pen: Jean Els 4', 22' (2/3)	Referee: Gerrie de Bruin

15 August 2015	Griquas U19	19–20	Boland U19	Northern Cape High School, Kimberley
14:00	Try: Martin Visagie 11'; JP Steyn 24'; Pieter Oosthuizen 56'; Con: Ruve Louw 12', 25' (2/3); Pen: Ruve Louw (0/1)	Report; Scoreboard	Try: Caleb Louw 16'; Colin April 43'; Austin Hendricks 52'; Con: Austin Hendricks 17' (1/3); Pen: Austin Hendricks 63' (1/2)	Referee: Paul Mente

=== Round two ===
21 August 2015	Griquas U19	36–17	Griffons U19	Griqua Park, Kimberley
15:00	Try: Martin Visagie 11'; Arthur Jones 31'; Brandon de Melim 43'; Gerhard Holtzhausen 51'; Damian van den Bergh 68'; Con: Wilfred Bowers 12', 44', 52', 69' (4/5); Pen: Cleo Adams (0/1); Wilfred Bowers 19' (1/2)	Report; Scoreboard	Try: Domenic Smit 7'; Nick Fortein 59'; Con: Domenic Smit 8', 60' (2/2); Pen: Domenic Smit 13' (1/3)	Attendance: 200; Referee: Pieter Janse van Vuuren

21 August 2015	SWD U19	17–41	Pumas U19	Outeniqua Park, George
15:15	Try: Shelwyn Dyssel 4'; Reinhadt Stears 50'; Shaun Booysen 59'; Con: Winrey Stoffels 51' (1/2); Pen: Winrey Stoffels (0/1); Cards: Robin Lolo (yellow card) 63'	Report; Scoreboard	Try: Ettiene Matthys 8'; Ian Truter 9', 44', 67'; Ruben Opperman 31'; Jean Els 35'; Jean-Pierre Snyman 36'; Con: Jean Els 9', 10', 68' (3/6)	Referee: Vusi Msibi

21 August 2015	Border U19	8–17	Falcons U19	Buffalo City Stadium, East London
17:30	Try: Siphelele Zono 47'; Con: Nathan Church (0/1); Pen: Nathan Church 7' (1/2); Cards: Lyle Skinner (yellow card) 61'	Report; Scoreboard	Try: Stephen Pelser 26'; Ruan Kotze 64'; Con: Conrad Engelbrecht 27', 65' (2/2); Pen: Conrad Engelbrecht 34' (1/1); Cards: Shane Erasmus (yellow card) 22' to 32'; Henning Buitendag (yellow card) 29' to 39'	Attendance: 500; Referee: Pieter Maritz

22 August 2015	Limpopo Blue Bulls U19	37–41	Boland U19	HTS Tom Naudé, Polokwane
13:00	Try: Jozua Naude 6', 58'; Branley Odendaal 23', 70'; Con: Simon Bezuidenhout 7', 24' (2/2); Dane Kotze 59', 71' (2/2); Pen: Simon Bezuidenhout 13', 28' (2/2); Dane Kotze 39' (1/1)	Report; Scoreboard	Try: Stephan Borman 20', 40'; Enzo Foutie 34', 42', 65'; Dylan Cloete 36', 53'; Con: Austin Hendricks 37', 43' (2/5); Dylan Cloete 41' (1/2); Cards: Marnus Niemand (yellow card) 50'	Referee: Paul Mente

=== Round three ===
28 August 2015	Pumas U19	44–33	Boland U19	Mbombela Stadium, Mbombela
14:30	Try: Ian Truter 3', 36'; Ruben Opperman 8', 52'; Jean-Pierre Snyman 14'; Jean Els 32'; Jacobus Fourie 41'; Delmond Venske 57'; Con: Jean Els 4' (1/5); Esje Esterhuyse 53' (1/3)	Report; Scoreboard	Try: Stephan Borman 11'; Enzo Foutie 13'; Handré Ontong 19'; Eugene Payne 60'; Austin Hendricks 62'; Con: Austin Hendricks 14', 20', 61', 63' (4/5); Pen: Austin Hendricks (0/2)	Referee: Jaco Kotze

29 August 2015	Falcons U19	12–27	Griquas U19	Barnard Stadium, Kempton Park
11:30	Try: Magiel Buitendag 46'; Erik Knoetze 63'; Con: Conrad Engelbrecht 47' (1/2); Cards: Magiel Buitendag (yellow card) 13' to 23'	Report; Scoreboard	Try: Damian van den Bergh 15'; Wilfred Bowers 20'; André Grobler 24', 33'; JP Abrahams 30'; Con: Wilfred Bowers 21' (1/4); JP Abrahams (0/1); Cards: Gerhard Holtzhausen (yellow card) 35' to 47'	Referee: Oregopotse Rametsi

29 August 2015	Griffons U19	37–3	SWD U19	HT Pelatona Projects Stadium, Welkom
11:45	Try: Ruben Abrahams 22'; Siya Ngxesha 24', 48', 57'; Jovanian du Preez 46'; Domenic Smit 51'; Con: Domenic Smit 58' (1/5); Riandré Muller 47' (1/1); Pen: Domenic Smit 38' (1/1); Cards: Siya Ngxesha (yellow card) 33' to 43'	Report; Scoreboard	Pen: Nathan Kemp 34' (1/1); Cards: Shaun Booysen (yellow card) 33' to 43'; Francois Botha (yellow card) 37' to 47'	Referee: Paul Mente

29 August 2015	Limpopo Blue Bulls U19	55–22	Border U19	Old Peter Mokaba Stadium, Polokwane
13:00	Try: Simon Bezuidenhout 7'; Francois Rousseau 16'; Dean Steinberg 40', 43', 54', 68'; Branley Odendaal 49'; Armandt Oosthuizen 52'; Aaron Sawu 66'; Con: Simon Bezuidenhout 8', 50' (2/5); Dane Kotze 53', 55', 69' (3/4)	Report; Scoreboard	Try: Keeran Bantom 20'; Ntando Mfengu 28'; Siphosihle Magawu 61'; Con: Nathan Church 21', 29' (2/3); Pen: Nathan Church 13' (1/1)	Referee: Ruhan Meiring

=== Round four ===
4 September 2015	SWD U19	23–26	Falcons U19	Outeniqua Park, George
15:15	Try: Justin Witbooi 9', 44'; Luvuyo Ndevu 52'; Clayton Kiewitz 60'; Con: Nathan Kemp (0/3); Winrey Stoffels (0/1); Pen: Nathan Kemp 33' (1/3); Winrey Stoffels (0/1)	Report; Scoreboard	Try: Shane Erasmus 15'; Bercho Botha 23', 40'; Kobus Kleyn 46'; Con: Conrad Engelbrecht 24', 41', 47' (3/4)	Referee: Jabian Jeftha

5 September 2015	Boland U19	17–29	Griffons U19	Boland Stadium, Wellington
12:00	Try: Colin April 21'; Steven Stallenberg 28'; Enzo Foutie 55'; Con: Austin Hendricks 29' (1/2); Dylan Cloete (0/1); Cards: Carlton Johnson (yellow card) 7' to 19'; Hadley Hendricks (yellow card) 43' to 54'; Luan du Randt (yellow card) 43' to 54'	Report; Scoreboard	Try: Benji Muller 18', 60'; Ezrick Alexander 25'; Melton Wentzel 51'; Domenic Smit 63'; Con: Luan James 26' (1/4); Jason Olivier 64' (1/1); Pen: Luan James (0/2)	Referee: Renier Vermeulen

5 September 2015	Griquas U19	50–12	Limpopo Blue Bulls U19	Jacobsdal High School
13:00	Try: Brandon de Melim 12'; Ignatius Bothma 15'; Cleo Adams 19'; Damian van den Bergh 29', 45'; Gerhard Holtzhausen 38'; Zayne Farmer 70'; Con: JP Abrahams 13', 15', 20', 30', 39', 71' (6/7); Pen: JP Abrahams 9' (1/1); Cards: Damian van den Bergh (red card) 64'	Report; Scoreboard	Try: Emile le Roux 22'; Simon Bezuidenhout 32'; Con: Simon Bezuidenhout 33' (1/2)	Referee: Jaco Kotze

5 September 2015	Pumas U19	48–5	Border U19	Puma Stadium, Witbank
14:30	Try: Ian Truter 4', 59'; Johannes Harmzen 7'; JP Mans 16'; Christo Swart 30'; Cornelius van Rooyen 33'; Jean-Pierre Snyman 39'; Ruben Opperman 68'; Con: Esje Esterhuyse 5', 34', 60', 69' (4/7); Jean Els (0/1)	Report; Scoreboard	Try: Siphelele Zono 13'; Con: Nathan Church (0/1); Drop: Siphelele Zono (0/1)	Referee: Oregopotse Rametsi

=== Round five ===
11 September 2015	Border U19	17–36	SWD U19	Buffalo City Stadium, East London
15:00	Try: Nathan Church 19'; Sarel van Loggerenberg 33'; Siphelele Zono 46'; Con: Darren Domingo 34' (1/3); Pen: Nathan Church (0/1); Cards: Darren Lottering (red card) 67'	Report; Scoreboard	Try: Shaun Booysen 1', 15'; Justin Williams 22', 39'; Caae-Jay Ferendale 41'; Schavon Laws 68'; Con: Nathan Kemp 2', 16', 40' (3/6); Pen: Nathan Kemp (0/1); Cards: Wikus Heunis (yellow card) 71'	Referee: Renier Vermeulen

12 September 2015	Falcons U19	45–0	Boland U19	Barnard Stadium, Kempton Park
11:30	Try: Dawid Kleynhans 9'; Kobus Kleyn 28'; Magiel Buitendag 36'; Bercho Botha 48'; Attie Jansen van Vuuren 53'; Willem Dreyer 60'; Armandt Jordaan 64'; Con: Conrad Engelbrecht 10', 29', 37', 54', 65' (5/7)	Report; Scoreboard	Cards: Marnus Niemand (yellow card) 58' to 68'	Referee: Ruhan Meiring

12 September 2015	Griffons U19	36–26	Limpopo Blue Bulls U19	HT Pelatona Projects Stadium, Welkom
11:45	Try: Ezrick Alexander 18'; Domenic Smit 25'; Gift Dlamini 29'; Benji Muller 42'; Jonathan April 64'; Con: Luan James 19', 30', 43', 65' (4/5); Pen: Luan James 6' (1/1)	Report; Scoreboard	Try: Renier Appelgryn 23'; Lean Claasen 33'; William Thomson 59'; Aaron Sawu 70'; Con: Dane Kotze 24', 34', 60' (3/4); Cards: André Mostert (yellow card) 46' to 56'	Referee: Vusi Msibi

12 September 2015	Pumas U19	36–0	Griquas U19	Puma Stadium, Witbank
13:30	Try: Ian Truter 3', 14'; Ruben Opperman 50'; Ettiene Matthys 62'; Tiaan Potgieter 68'; Con: Johannes Harmzen 4', 15', 51', 69' (4/5); Pen: Johannes Harmzen 25' (1/1); Cards: Jean-Pierre Snyman (yellow card) 12'; Ruben Opperman (yellow card) 58'	Report; Scoreboard	Cards: Brandon de Melim (red card) 25'; Arthur Jones (yellow card) 28'	Referee: Paul Mente

=== Round six ===
19 September 2015	Griffons U19	31–19	Falcons U19	HT Pelatona Projects Stadium, Welkom
11:45	Try: Domenic Smit 4'; Luan James 16'; Jason Olivier 24'; Ezrick Alexander 34'; Con: Luan James 5', 17', 25', 35' (4/4); Pen: Luan James 53' (1/2); Cards: Fanie Vermaak (yellow card) 14' to 26'	Report; Scoreboard	Try: Willem Dreyer 6', 42'; Cornelius Jacobs 49'; Con: Conrad Engelbrecht 7', 50' (2/3); Cards: Willem Dreyer (yellow card) 19' to 29'; Christiaan Denil (yellow card) 51' to 61'	Referee: Paul Mente

19 September 2015	Boland U19	62–14	SWD U19	Boland Stadium, Wellington
12:00	Try: Steven Stallenberg 7'; Ray Philander 21'; Handré Ontong 27', 64'; Yose Ngelethu 31'; Stephan Borman 33'; Tyron Roberts 37'; Eugene Payne 40'; Enzo Foutie 68'; Con: Stephan Borman 8', 28', 32', 34', 38', 41', 69' (7/9); Pen: Stephan Borman 13' (1/1); Cards: Benjamin Dwayi (yellow card) 16' to 26'	Report; Scoreboard	Try: Corné Marais 49'; Caae-Jay Ferendale 54'; Con: Nathan Kemp 50', 55' (2/2); Cards: Francois Botha (yellow card) 30' to 40'	Referee: Divan Uys

19 September 2015	Griquas U19	83–10	Border U19	Griqua Park, Kimberley
13:00		Report; Scoreboard		Referee: Pieter Maritz

19 September 2015	Limpopo Blue Bulls U19	21–27	Pumas U19	Peter Mokaba Stadium, Polokwane
13:00	Try: Christiaan Wessels 25' penalty try 66'; Con: Dane Kotze 67' (1/2); Pen: Dane Kotze 11', 37', 43' (3/3)	Report; Scoreboard	Try: Ruben Opperman 23'; Ettiene Matthys 54'; Kyle Erasmus 63'; Con: Theunis Sauer 24' (1/1); Esje Esterhuyse 55', 64' (2/2); Pen: Theunis Sauer 30', 34' (2/3); Cards: Ettiene Matthys (yellow card) 67'	Referee: Jacques Nieuwenhuis

=== Round seven ===
25 September 2015	SWD U19	19–58	Griquas U19	Outeniqua Park, George
15:15	Try: Justin Williams 20'; Caae-Jay Ferendale 27'; Zavien Klaasen 29'; Con: Nathan Kemp 28', 29' (2/3); Cards: Caae-Jay Ferendale (yellow card) 55' to 65'	Report; Scoreboard	Try: Wilfred Bowers 10'; Guilliam Viljoen 30'; Pieter Oosthuizen 33'; Brendon de Beer 38'; Zayne Farmer 49'; Arthur Jones 55'; JP Steyn 60'; Gerhard Holtzhausen 67'; Con: JP Abrahams 11', 39', 50', 56', 61' (5/7); Wilfred Bowers 34' (1/1); Pen: JP Abrahams 2', 45' (2/2)	Referee: Divan Uys

26 September 2015	Griffons U19	17–15	Pumas U19	HT Pelatona Projects Stadium, Welkom
11:45	Try: Duke Jantjies 38'; Con: Luan James (0/1); Pen: Luan James 6', 10', 24', 27' (4/6); Drop: Luan James (0/1); Cards: Jonathan April (red card) 14'	Report; Scoreboard	Try: Ian Truter 17'; JP Mans 43'; Con: Theunis Sauer 18' (1/2); Pen: Theunis Sauer 4' (1/2); Esje Esterhuyse (0/1); Cards: JP Mans (yellow card) 23' to 33'	Referee: Jacques Nieuwenhuis

26 September 2015	Boland U19	43–26	Border U19	Boland Stadium, Wellington
13:00	Try: Clarence van Wyk 2'; Enzo Foutie 12'; Stephan Borman 17'; Handré Ontong 20'; Steven Stallenberg 43', 66'; Colin April 69'; Con: Stephan Borman 13', 18', 44', 67' (4/7)	Report; Scoreboard	Try: Darren Lottering 24', 33'; Siphelele Zono 37'; Siphosihle Magawu 57'; Con: Darren Domingo 25', 34', 58' (3/4); Pen: Darren Domingo (0/1)	Referee: Ruhan Meiring

26 September 2015	Limpopo Blue Bulls U19	19–36	Falcons U19	Peter Mokaba Stadium, Polokwane
13:00	Try: Martin Shioma 33'; Heinrich du Plessis 41'; George Letshuma 67'; Con: Dane Kotze 34', 42' (2/3)	Report; Scoreboard	Try: Christopher Schimper 8'; Attie Jansen van Vuuren 20', 37'; Cornelius Jacobs 27'; Petrus Griesel 47'; Ruan Kotze 54'; Con: Conrad Engelbrecht 21', 38', 48' (3/6)	Referee: Paul Mente

=== Semi-finals ===
3 October 2015	Pumas U19	39–12	Falcons U19	Mbombela Stadium, Mbombela
10:30	Try: JP Mans 15'; Theunis Sauer 29'; Ettiene Matthys 31', 67'; Ruben Opperman 49'; Ruben Roodt 60'; Con: Theunis Sauer 16', 50' (2/4); Jean Els 68' (1/2); Pen: Theunis Sauer 44' (1/1); Cards: Delmond Venske (yellow card) 59' to 69'	Report; Scoreboard	Try: Henning Buitendag 65', 70'; Con: Conrad Engelbrecht 66' (1/2); Pen: Conrad Engelbrecht (0/2); Cards: Cornelius Jacobs (yellow card) 24'; Willem Dreyer (yellow card) 59' to 69'; Philippus Booyse (yellow card) 69'	Referee: Pieter Maritz

3 October 2015	Griffons U19	44–14	Griquas U19	HT Pelatona Projects Stadium, Welkom
13:15	Try: Ronaldo Fortuin 15', 67'; Gift Dlamini 28'; Domenic Smit 51', 54'; Luan James 64'; Con: Luan James 16', 29', 65', 68' (4/6); Pen: Luan James 4', 18' (2/4); Cards: Tristan Rothman (yellow card) 27' to 37'	Report; Scoreboard	Try: JP Steyn 47', 60'; Con: JP Abrahams 48', 61' (2/2); Pen: JP Abrahams (0/1); Cards: Brandon de Melim (yellow card) 27' to 37'; JP Roets (yellow card) 68'	Referee: Ricus van der Hoven

=== Final ===
8 October 2015	Pumas U19	21–24	Griffons U19	Olën Park, Potchefstroom
14:40	Try: Christo Swart 25'; Ian Truter 58'; Con: Theunis Sauer 26' (1/2); Pen: Theunis Sauer 5', 21', 28' (3/3); Cards: Rujacques dos Santos (yellow card) 34' to 45'	Report; Scoreboard	Try: Stephanus Malherbe 9'; Gift Dlamini 18'; Luan James 30'; Richman Gora 44'; Con: Luan James 31', 45' (2/4); Pen: Luan James (0/2); Drop: Luan James (0/1); Cards: Luciano Jones (yellow card) 14' to 25'	Referee: Jaco Pretorius

== Honours ==
The honour roll for the 2015 Under-19 Provincial Championship Group B was:

2015 Under-19 Provincial Championship Group B Honours
Champions:	Griffons U19
Top Try Scorer:	Ian Truter, Pumas U19 (13)
Top Points Scorer:	Luan James, Griffons U19 (69)

== Players ==
=== Points scorers ===
The following table contain points which were scored in the 2015 Under-19 Provincial Championship Group B:

All point scorers
No	Player	Team	T	C	P	DG	Pts
1	Luan James	Griffons U19	3	15	8	0	69
2	Ian Truter	Pumas U19	13	0	0	0	65
3	Domenic Smit	Griffons U19	8	3	2	0	52
4	Stephan Borman	Boland U19	5	11	1	0	50
5	Conrad Engelbrecht	Falcons U19	0	20	1	0	43
6	JP Abrahams	Griquas U19	1	13	3	0	40
6	Ruben Opperman	Pumas U19	8	0	0	0	40
8	Theunis Sauer	Pumas U19	1	5	7	0	36
9	Enzo Foutie	Boland U19	7	0	0	0	35
10	Jean Els	Pumas U19	2	9	2	0	34
10	Dane Kotze	Limpopo Blue Bulls U19	0	11	4	0	34
12	Austin Hendricks	Boland U19	2	8	1	0	29
13	Simon Bezuidenhout	Limpopo Blue Bulls U19	2	5	2	0	26
14	Wilfred Bowers	Griquas U19	2	6	1	0	25
14	Ettiene Matthys	Pumas U19	5	0	0	0	25
14	Dean Steinberg	Limpopo Blue Bulls U19	5	0	0	0	25
17	Nathan Kemp	SWD U19	0	9	2	0	24
18	Bercho Botha	Falcons U19	4	0	0	0	20
18	Caae-Jay Ferendale	SWD U19	4	0	0	0	20
18	Siya Ngxesha	Griffons U19	4	0	0	0	20
18	Branley Odendaal	Limpopo Blue Bulls U19	4	0	0	0	20
18	Handré Ontong	Boland U19	4	0	0	0	20
18	Steven Stallenberg	Boland U19	4	0	0	0	20
18	JP Steyn	Griquas U19	4	0	0	0	20
18	Damian van den Bergh	Griquas U19	4	0	0	0	20
18	Justin Williams	SWD U19	4	0	0	0	20
18	Siphelele Zono	Border U19	4	0	0	0	20
28	Johannes Harmzen	Pumas U19	1	4	1	0	16
29	Ezrick Alexander	Griffons U19	3	0	0	0	15
29	Colin April	Boland U19	3	0	0	0	15
29	Shaun Booysen	SWD U19	3	0	0	0	15
29	Henning Buitendag	Falcons U19	3	0	0	0	15
29	Nathan Church	Border U19	1	2	2	0	15
29	Gift Dlamini	Griffons U19	3	0	0	0	15
29	Willem Dreyer	Falcons U19	3	0	0	0	15
29	Gerhard Holtzhausen	Griquas U19	3	0	0	0	15
29	Attie Jansen van Vuuren	Falcons U19	3	0	0	0	15
29	Ruan Kotze	Falcons U19	3	0	0	0	15
29	JP Mans	Pumas U19	3	0	0	0	15
29	Benji Muller	Griffons U19	3	0	0	0	15
29	Jean-Pierre Snyman	Pumas U19	3	0	0	0	15
42	Esje Esterhuyse	Pumas U19	0	7	0	0	14
43	Dylan Cloete	Boland U19	2	1	0	0	12
43	Justin Opperman	Border U19	0	0	4	0	12
45	Magiel Buitendag	Falcons U19	2	0	0	0	10
45	Brandon de Melim	Griquas U19	2	0	0	0	10
45	Heinrich du Plessis	Limpopo Blue Bulls U19	2	0	0	0	10
45	Zayne Farmer	Griquas U19	2	0	0	0	10
45	Ronaldo Fortuin	Griffons U19	2	0	0	0	10
45	Andre Grobler	Griquas U19	2	0	0	0	10
45	Cornelius Jacobs	Falcons U19	2	0	0	0	10
45	Arthur Jones	Griquas U19	2	0	0	0	10
45	Clayton Kiewitz	SWD U19	2	0	0	0	10
45	Kobus Kleyn	Falcons U19	2	0	0	0	10
45	Darren Lottering	Border U19	2	0	0	0	10
45	Siphosihle Magawu	Border U19	2	0	0	0	10
45	Jozua Naude	Limpopo Blue Bulls U19	2	0	0	0	10
45	Pieter Oosthuizen	Griquas U19	2	0	0	0	10
45	Eugene Payne	Boland U19	2	0	0	0	10
45	Stephen Pelser	Falcons U19	2	0	0	0	10
45	Aaron Sawu	Limpopo Blue Bulls U19	2	0	0	0	10
45	Christo Swart	Pumas U19	2	0	0	0	10
45	Martin Visagie	Griquas U19	2	0	0	0	10
45	Christiaan Wessels	Limpopo Blue Bulls U19	2	0	0	0	10
45	Justin Witbooi	SWD U19	2	0	0	0	10
66	Darren Domingo	Border U19	0	4	0	0	8
66	André Potgieter	Griffons U19	0	1	2	0	8
68	Jason Olivier	Griffons U19	1	1	0	0	7
69	Ruben Abrahams	Griffons U19	1	0	0	0	5
69	Cleo Adams	Griquas U19	1	0	0	0	5
69	Renier Appelgryn	Limpopo Blue Bulls U19	1	0	0	0	5
69	Jonathan April	Griffons U19	1	0	0	0	5
69	Keeran Bantom	Border U19	1	0	0	0	5
69	Ignatius Bothma	Griquas U19	1	0	0	0	5
69	Lean Claasen	Limpopo Blue Bulls U19	1	0	0	0	5
69	Kobus Coetzee	Pumas U19	1	0	0	0	5
69	Brendon de Beer	Griquas U19	1	0	0	0	5
69	Jovanian du Preez	Griffons U19	1	0	0	0	5
69	Shelwyn Dyssel	SWD U19	1	0	0	0	5
69	Kyle Erasmus	Pumas U19	1	0	0	0	5
69	Shane Erasmus	Falcons U19	1	0	0	0	5
69	Nick Fortein	Griffons U19	1	0	0	0	5
69	Jacobus Fourie	Pumas U19	1	0	0	0	5
69	Richman Gora	Griffons U19	1	0	0	0	5
69	Petrus Griesel	Falcons U19	1	0	0	0	5
69	Duke Jantjies	Griffons U19	1	0	0	0	5
69	Armandt Jordaan	Falcons U19	1	0	0	0	5
69	Zavien Klaasen	SWD U19	1	0	0	0	5
69	Dawid Kleynhans	Falcons U19	1	0	0	0	5
69	Erik Knoetze	Falcons U19	1	0	0	0	5
69	Schavon Laws	SWD U19	1	0	0	0	5
69	Emile le Roux	Limpopo Blue Bulls U19	1	0	0	0	5
69	George Letshuma	Limpopo Blue Bulls U19	1	0	0	0	5
69	Caleb Louw	Boland U19	1	0	0	0	5
69	Karabo Makotane	Falcons U19	1	0	0	0	5
69	Stephanus Malherbe	Griffons U19	1	0	0	0	5
69	Corne Marais	SWD U19	1	0	0	0	5
69	André Mathews	Pumas U19	1	0	0	0	5
69	Ntando Mfengu	Border U19	1	0	0	0	5
69	Luvuyo Ndevu	SWD U19	1	0	0	0	5
69	Yose Ngelethu	Boland U19	1	0	0	0	5
69	Armandt Oosthuizen	Limpopo Blue Bulls U19	1	0	0	0	5
69	Ray Philander	Boland U19	1	0	0	0	5
69	Tiaan Potgieter	Pumas U19	1	0	0	0	5
69	Tyron Roberts	Boland U19	1	0	0	0	5
69	Ruben Roodt	Pumas U19	1	0	0	0	5
69	Francois Rousseau	Limpopo Blue Bulls U19	1	0	0	0	5
69	Christopher Schimper	Falcons U19	1	0	0	0	5
69	Martin Shioma	Limpopo Blue Bulls U19	1	0	0	0	5
69	Reinhadt Stears	SWD U19	1	0	0	0	5
69	William Thomson	Limpopo Blue Bulls U19	1	0	0	0	5
69	Sarel van Loggerenberg	Border U19	1	0	0	0	5
69	Cornelius van Rooyen	Pumas U19	1	0	0	0	5
69	Clarence van Wyk	Boland U19	1	0	0	0	5
69	Delmond Venske	Pumas U19	1	0	0	0	5
69	Guilliam Viljoen	Griquas U19	1	0	0	0	5
69	Melton Wentzel	Griffons U19	1	0	0	0	5
118	Ruve Louw	Griquas U19	0	2	0	0	4
118	Jeandré Rossouw	Limpopo Blue Bulls U19	0	2	0	0	4
120	Riandré Muller	Griffons U19	0	1	0	0	2
120	Winrey Stoffels	SWD U19	0	1	0	0	2
* Legend: T = Tries, C = Conversions, P = Penalties, DG = Drop Goals, Pts = Points.

=== Squads ===
The following players were included in matchday squads:

2015 Boland U19 squad
Forwards	Robin Adams • Colin April • Reece Bocks • Christo Cloete • Anthony Creighton • Cyle Davids • Luan du Randt • Benjamin Dwayi • Sachin Farmer • Hadley Hendricks • Carlton Johnson • Marco Mostert • Simon Ndlovu • Marnus Niemand • Chalmers Pienaar • Tyron Roberts • Jerome September • Jurgen van Staden • Clarence van Wyk Did not play: Keenu Jardine • Yose Ngelethu
Backs	Gurshwin Africa • Stephan Borman • Dylan Cloete • Enzo Foutie • Austin Hendricks • Chad Horne • Caleb Louw • Handre Ontong • Eugene Payne • Ray Philander • Steven Stallenberg • Eric Vincent • Wihan von Wielligh

2015 Border U19 squad
Forwards	Siphosethu Biko • Johan Crous • Rudi du Randt • Sihlumile Gantsho • Sandi Gongxeka • Jean Grieb • Hano Jacobs • Mbasa Magagamela • Siphosihle Magawu • Thabo Magaza • Josh Manthe • Wam Mbana • Sipho Mbusi • Nico Putter • Onele Sijila • Lyle Skinner • Johannes Smit • Darren Swartz • Phumlani Thembani • Sarel van Loggerenberg • Daniel Voigt
Backs	Nathan Augustus • Keeran Bantom • Asithandile Ben • Nathan Church • Darren Domingo • Arthur Heyns • Thembani Kori • Sinegugu Lituka • Darren Lottering • Ntando Mfengu • Justin Opperman • Devaughan Pauls • Enzo Sass • Renzo Sass • Ruhan Sirgel • Siphelele Zono • Did not play: Luyolo Gwarube

2015 Falcons U19 squad
Forwards	Philippus Booyse • Bercho Botha • Stuart de Lacey • Christiaan Denil • Willem Dreyer • Petrus Griesel • Cornelius Jacobs • Armandt Jordaan • Dawid Kleynhans • Erik Knoetze • Ruan Kotze • Raymond Labuschagné • Stefan le Roux • Dias Meya • Teboho Mofokeng • Luc Mynhardt • Petrus Oosthuizen • Stephen Pelser • Francois van Niekerk • Eben Vorster
Backs	Arno Brits • Henning Buitendag • Magiel Buitendag • Conrad Engelbrecht • Shane Erasmus • Henk Esterhuysen • Attie Jansen van Vuuren • Heino Keyser • Kobus Kleyn • Ntshepe Kokong • Rudolf Heenop • Karabo Makotane • Christopher Schimper • Bongi Zwane

2015 Griffons U19 squad
Forwards	Ricus Alkema • Dylan Aploon • Zacharias Bester • Michiel Bosman • Ruben Breedt • Malcolm Britz • Gift Dlamini • Richard Earle • Byron Ferreira • Nick Fortein • Duke Jantjies • Juan-Pierre Kalp • Winrich Kennedy • Jerome Lottering • Stephanus Malherbe • Wesley McMaster • Morne Mkwayi • Neo Mohapi • Lohan Potgieter • Tristan Rothman • Relebohile Sekhobo • Gideon van Eeden • Adam van Wyk • Fanie Vermaak • Melton Wentzel • Did not play: Damian de Jongh
Backs	Ruben Abrahams • Ezrick Alexander • Jonathan April • Jovanian du Preez • Gerald James Ekron • Ronaldo Fortuin • Richman Gora • Daniel Hendricks • Jacques Henning • Luan James • Luciano Jones • Juan-Carlo Kleynhans • Balo Mteyise • Benji Muller • Riandre Muller • Siya Ngxesha • Jason Olivier • Khanyiso Pini • André Potgieter • Domenic Smit • Dawid Johannes Snyman • Danneel Stone • Wentzel Witbooi Did not play: Martin de Villiers • Michiel Human • Hendrik van Staden

2015 Griquas U19 squad
Forwards	Rodney Bartlett • Ignatius Bothma • Teubes Brits • Janco Cloete • Brendon de Beer • Dehan Engelbrecht • Josia Gerber • Werner Goosen • Gerhard Holtzhausen • Arthur Jones • Rian Kotze • Pieter Oosthuizen • Schalk Smit • Damian van den Bergh • Willem van den Heever • Corné van der Merwe • John-Duncan Vertue • Guilliam Viljoen • Lihan Viljoen • Martin Visagie • Garth-Lee Young • Did not play: JD Griffin
Backs	JP Abrahams • Cleo Adams • Wilfred Bowers • Brandon de Melim • Zayne Farmer • Andre Grobler • Daniello Huyster • Jonathan Janse van Rensburg • Marius Joubert • Jurgen Krause • Ruve Louw • Lluwellyne Moolman • JP Roets • JP Steyn • Did not play: Austwille Buffel • Austin Ntsiko

2015 Limpopo Blue Bulls U19 squad
Forwards	JP Alberts • Tyler Brown • Heinrich du Plessis • Matthew Fernandes • George Letshuma • Boeta Matsaung • Pieter Muller • Johan Murray • Philip Myburgh • Jozua Naude • Renier Nell • Jacob Nelson • Branley Odendaal • Armandt Oosthuizen • Francois Rousseau • Aaron Sawu • Hermanus Scott • Martin Shioma • William Thomson • Sonwabile Wolela
Backs	Renier Appelgryn • Nahum Bangura • Simon Bezuidenhout • Lean Claasen • Johan de Bod • Juan-Pierre Fourie • Dane Kotze • Emile le Roux • Jason Makhari • Karabo Masike • Andre Mostert • Dylan Neser • Brandon Pretorius • Oko Qwesha • Jeandre Rossouw • Dean Steinberg • Dillan van Wyk • Christiaan Wessels

2015 Pumas U19 squad
Forwards	Joost Conradie • Rujacques dos Santos • Daniel Doubell • Jacobus Fourie • Burger Kriel • Christian Lewies • Kumbirai Makina • JP Mans • Andre Mathews • Ettiene Matthys • Leon Smal • Julian Smith • Jean-Pierre Snyman • Wiehan Steyn • Christo Swart • Cornelius van Rooyen • Delmond Venske
Backs	Kobus Coetzee • Jean Els • Kyle Erasmus • Esje Esterhuyse • Johannes Harmzen • Marco Marais • Calvin Mengel • Ruben Opperman • Tiaan Potgieter • Ruben Roodt • Theunis Sauer • Ian Truter

2015 SWD U19 squad
Forwards	Francois Botha • Curt de Laan • Adriaan-Lee Du Preez • Litho Ferreira • Werner Heunis • Wikus Heunis • Tiaan Janse van Rensburg • Zavien Klaasen • Justin Levendal • Deveron Lindoor • Robin Lolo • Luvuyo Ndevu • Shane Olckers • Leono Oosthuizen • Robert Pace • Albresto Pietersen • Jan Prinsloo • Reinhadt Stears • Luke Steyl • Leon Swart • Roelof van der Merwe • Hermanus Venter • Justin Williams • Gerard Zondagh
Backs	Craig Booysen • Shaun Booysen • Clide Davids • Shelwyn Dyssel • Caae-Jay Ferendale • Michael Fernol • Justin Harker • Mario Jacobs • Nathan Kemp • Clayton Kiewitz • Schavon Laws • Corné Marais • Keith Marx • Taquin Meyer • Darren Moos • Drikus Snyman • Ruan Steyn • Winrey Stoffels • Justin Witbooi

=== Discipline ===
The following table contains all the cards handed out during the tournament:

Cards
Player	Team	Sent off (straight red)	Temporarily suspended
Brandon de Melim	Griquas U19	1	1
Jonathan April	Griffons U19	1	0
Damian van den Bergh	Griquas U19	1	0
Darren Lottering	Border U19	1	0
Willem Dreyer	Falcons U19	0	3
Francois Botha	SWD U19	0	2
Marnus Niemand	Boland U19	0	2
Philippus Booyse	Falcons U19	0	1
Shaun Booysen	SWD U19	0	1
Henning Buitendag	Falcons U19	0	1
Magiel Buitendag	Falcons U19	0	1
Christiaan Denil	Falcons U19	0	1
Rujacques dos Santos	Pumas U19	0	1
Luan du Randt	Boland U19	0	1
Benjamin Dwayi	Boland U19	0	1
Shane Erasmus	Falcons U19	0	1
Caae-Jay Ferendale	SWD U19	0	1
Hadley Hendricks	Boland U19	0	1
Wikus Heunis	SWD U19	0	1
Gerhard Holtzhausen	Griquas U19	0	1
Cornelius Jacobs	Falcons U19	0	1
Carlton Johnson	Boland U19	0	1
Arthur Jones	Griquas U19	0	1
Luciano Jones	Griffons U19	0	1
Robin Lolo	SWD U19	0	1
JP Mans	Pumas U19	0	1
Ettiene Matthys	Pumas U19	0	1
André Mostert	Limpopo Blue Bulls U19	0	1
Siya Ngxesha	Griffons U19	0	1
Ruben Opperman	Pumas U19	0	1
JP Roets	Griquas U19	0	1
Tristan Rothman	Griffons U19	0	1
Lyle Skinner	Border U19	0	1
Jean-Pierre Snyman	Pumas U19	0	1
Delmond Venske	Pumas U19	0	1
Fanie Vermaak	Griffons U19	0	1
* Legend: (red card) = Sent off, (yellow card) = Sin-binned

== Referees ==
The following referees officiated matches in the 2015 Under-19 Provincial Championship Group B:

2015 Under-21 Provincial Championship Group A referees
Referees	Gerrie de Bruin • Pieter Janse van Vuuren • Jabian Jeftha • Jaco Kotze • Pieter Maritz • Ruhan Meiring • Paul Mente • Vusi Msibi • Jacques Nieuwenhuis • Jaco Pretorius • Oregopotse Rametsi • Egon Seconds • Divan Uys • Ricus van der Hoven • Renier Vermeulen

== See also ==
- Currie Cup
- 2015 Currie Cup Premier Division
- 2015 Currie Cup First Division
- 2015 Under-21 Provincial Championship Group A
- 2015 Under-21 Provincial Championship Group B
- 2015 Under-19 Provincial Championship Group A
