= Jacobus Swart =

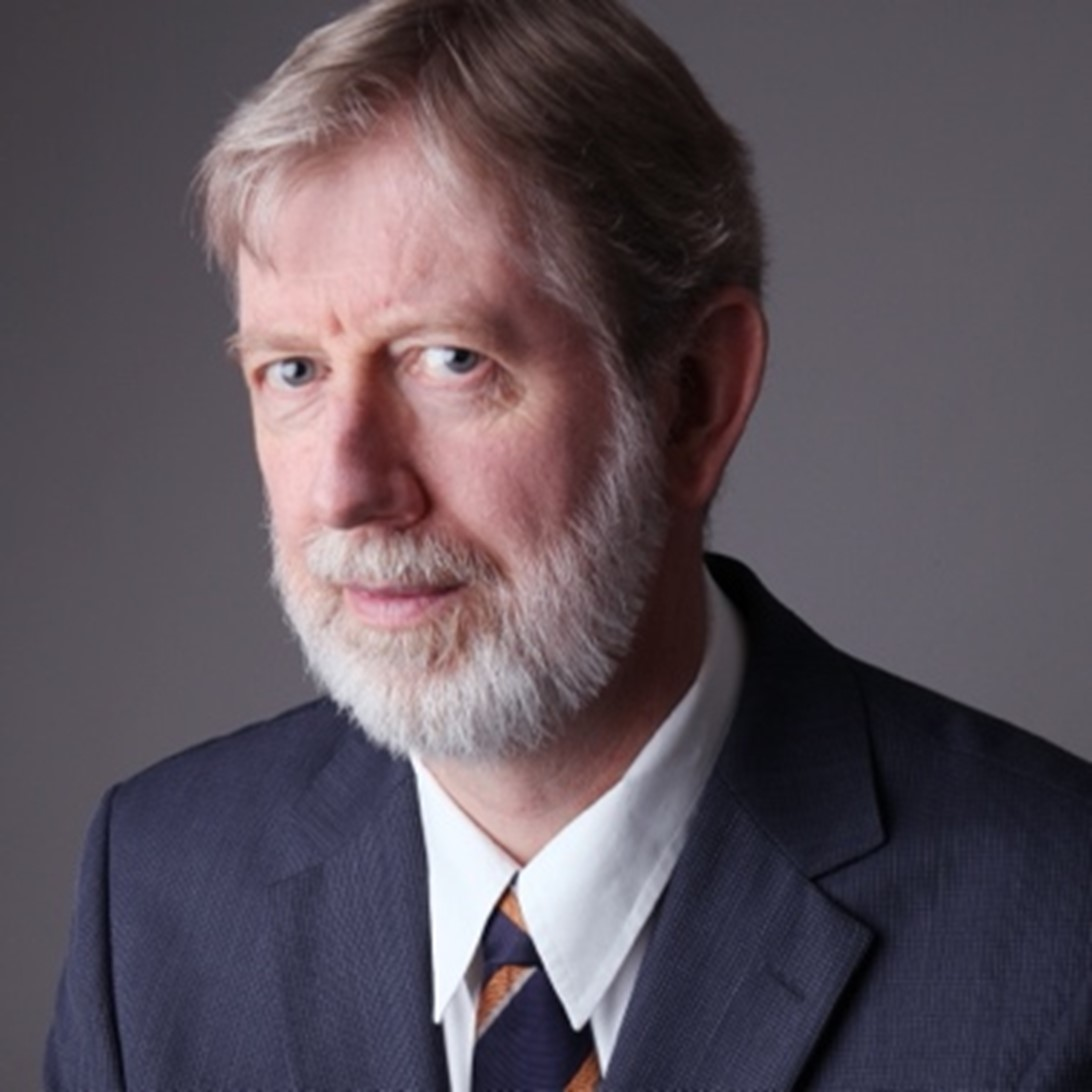
Jacobus Swart

Jacobus Swart (* February 9, 1950 in Heiloo, The Netherlands) is a professor at State University of Campinas - UNICAMP, Campinas, Brazil and was named Fellow of the Institute of Electrical and Electronics Engineers (IEEE) in 2014 for contributions to microelectronics education in Brazil.

== Biography ==
Jacobus Swart got his Engineer Degree and a Doctor in Engineering from Polytechnic School of the University of São Paulo, USP, in 1975 and 1981 respectively. Afterwards he did a postdoc at Catholic University of Leuven, Leuven, Belgium. Later-on he was a visiting researcher for some time at Research Triangle Institute, NC; at Cornell University, NY; at Institute of Mobile and Satellite Communication Techniques in Germany and University of Bordeaux in France. He was an academic member of the Polytechnic School of the University of São Paulo before he joined FEE UNICAMP in 1988 where he became full professor in 1997. He acted also as director of the Center for Semiconductors at UNICAMP and also of a national research center named CTI Renato Archer in Campinas. From 2013 until 2020 he served as representative of IMEC from Belgium in Brazil.

== Accomplishments ==
Jacobus Swart authored and co-authored so far 76 journal papers and 220 articles in conference proceedings. He is author of an engineering teaching book entitled Semicondutores: Fundamentos, técnicas e aplicações. He gave numerous invited talks and participated in round table discussions, summum up 190 times. He is a Distinguished Lecturer of the Institute of Electrical and Electronics Engineers. His research topics include silicon and compound semiconductor technologies, device modeling and circuit design. He supervised over 60 thesis and dissertations at USP and University of Campinas (Unicamp).

== Awards ==
- 2020: EDS/IEEE Distinguished Service Award 2020
- 2014: IEEE Fellow
- 2014: Full Member of National Engineering Academy
- 2012: Full Member of Science Academy of the State of São Paulo
- 2010: Pe Roberto Landell de Moura Award by Brazilian Microelectronics Societey – SBMicro
- 1992: Research Fellowship by CNPq, with highest level 1A since 2003
