= Zwarts =

Zwarts is a surname. Notable people with the surname include:

- Frans Zwarts (born 1949), Dutch linguist
- Joël Zwarts (born 1999), Dutch footballer
- Kim Zwarts (born 1955), Dutch photographer
- Moshé Zwarts (1937–2019), Dutch architect

== See also ==
- Zwart
