= Martijn de Zwart =

Dutch footballer (born 1990)

Personal information
- Full name: Martijn de Zwart
- Date of birth: 8 November 1990 (age 35)
- Place of birth: Valkenburg, South Holland, Netherlands
- Height: 1.88 m (6 ft 2 in)
- Position: Goalkeeper

Team information
- Current team: Quick Boys
- Number: 26

Youth career
- Quick Boys

Senior career*
Years	Team	Apps	(Gls)
2009–2011	Quick Boys		
2011–2014	ADO Den Haag	5	(0)
2014–	Quick Boys	129	(0)
- * Club domestic league appearances and goals as of 16 November 2020

Martijn de Zwart (Dutch pronunciation: [mɑrˈtɛin də ˈzʋɑrt]; born 8 November 1990) is a Dutch footballer who plays as a goalkeeper for Dutch Tweede Divisie club Quick Boys, where he is also the current goalkeeping coach.

== Career ==
A prospect of Quick Boys, De Zwart moved to ADO Den Haag in July 2011. At ADO, he was mostly a backup for Gino Coutinho and Robert Zwinkels, but he managed to make his professional debut on 9 March 2013 in a 1–1 draw in the Eredivisie match against AZ. In June 2013, he signed a one-year contract extension with the club.

After the expiration of his contract on 30 June 2014, De Zwart returned to childhood club Quick Boys.

After six years at Quick Boys, where he mainly played as a backup in the later years, De Zwart became goalkeepers coach in July 2020, while continuing as a backup to starter Paul van der Helm.

== Honours ==
Quick Boys

- Hoofdklasse: 2015–16

Individual

- Quick Boys Player of the Season: 2009–10
