= Malherbe Swart =

South African rugby union player (born 1991)

- Born: 27 March 1991 (age 35) Klerksdorp, South Africa
- Height: 1.82 m (5 ft 11 1/2 in)
- Weight: 87 kg (13 st 10 lb; 192 lb)
- School: Hoër Volkskool, Potchefstroom
- University: North-West University

Rugby union career
- Position: Scrum-half
- Current team: Leopards
Youth career
- 2008–2012: Leopards
Amateur team(s)
Years	Team	Apps	(Points)
2015–2016	NWU Pukke	12	(17)
Senior career
Years	Team	Apps	(Points)
2013–2015	Leopards XV	12	(5)
2015–present	Leopards	29	(18)
- Correct as of 1 December 2016

Malherbe Swart (born 27 March 1991) is a South African professional rugby union player currently playing with theLeopards. His regular position is scrum-half.

== Rugby career ==
=== 2008–2012 : Youth rugby ===
Swart was born in Klerksdorp and attended and played first team rugby for Hoër Volkskool in Potchefstroom, from where he was selected to represent the Leopards at the Under-18 Academy Week tournament in 2008.

After high school, he continued to represent the Leopards at various youth levels. He played for the Leopards U19 team in the 2010 Under-19 Provincial Championship, making ten appearances as the team finished in fourth spot to qualify for a semi-final, which they lost to Western Province U19.

He started ten of the Leopards U21s' twelve matches in the 2012 Under-21 Provincial Championship, playing off the bench in the other two. He scored three tries in the competition – he scored home and away against Golden Lions U21s, and also scored a try against Blue Bulls U21 as the team finished in sixth place.

=== 2013–present: Leopards and NWU Pukke ===
In 2013, Swart was included in the Leopards XV squad that competed in the 2013 Vodacom Cup competition. He made his first class debut on 9 March 2013, coming on as a replacement in their 15–45 defeat to the Golden Lions XV. Six days later, he made another appearance from the bench against the Limpopo Blue Bulls. He scored his first senior try in that match, getting the last of his side's 17 tries in a 113–3 victory. A third appearance against the Falcons followed for his team that eventually missed out on a play-off spot on points difference.

Swart made his first senior start in the 2014 Vodacom Cup competition, in a 16–18 defeat to the Golden Lions XV on the opening day of the season. He made four more starts in the season as the team again fell short, finishing in fifth place to miss out on the quarter finals. He was included in the Leopards squad for the 2014 Currie Cup First Division, but failed to make any appearances.

Swart's 2015 season started by him playing for Potchefstroom-based university side NWU Pukke in the 2015 Varsity Cup. He made just two substitute appearances during the regular season that saw the team finish in fourth spot to claim a semi-final spot, but started their 29–28 semi-final victory over UP Tuks as well as the final against UFS Shimlas. He scored his side's first try, but could not prevent the team from Bloemfontein winning 63–33 to condemn NWU Pukke to their second consecutive runners-up spot.

After the Varsity Cup, he rejoined the Leopards XV for his third successive Vodacom Cup campaign. He made three starts as the team finished in fourth spot on the log, and came on as a replacement in their 22–47 defeat to Western Province in the Quarter Final.

He made his first appearance in the Currie Cup competition, coming on as a replacement in their 45–17 victory over SWD Eagles in their first match in the 2015 Currie Cup qualification series, and also played off the bench in a victory over the Border Bulldogs in their final match. The Leopards missed out on a spot in the Currie Cup Premier Division by a single point, instead dropping into the First Division. Swart was the Leopards' first-choice scrum-half throughout that competition, starting all seven of their matches. He scored a try in their final round victory over the Falcons, to end the regular season having won all ten of their matches. He helped the Leopards beat the same opposition in the semi-finals a week later, and also started the final, where a 44–20 victory over the SWD Eagles secure the Leopards' first ever First Division title.

Swart started eight of the NWU Pukke's nine matches in the 2016 Varsity Cup, scoring tries against Maties and CUT Ixias en route to a third consecutive final. After losing three previous finals, the team finally won their first Varsity Cup trophy, beating Maties 7–6 in the final.

Thirteen appearances for the Leopards in the 2016 Currie Cup qualification series followed, which included a try in their match against the Golden Lions XV. The team failed to qualify for the Currie Cup Premier Division after finishing in eighth place, which meant they could defend their First Division title. Swart played in all seven of their matches as the team once again made it all the way to the final with an unbeaten record, but this time fell short, with the Griffons winning 44–25.
