= Henriette de Swart =

Dutch linguist

Henriëtte Elisabeth de Swart (born 15 May 1961, in Doetinchem) is a Dutch linguist.

== Education and research ==
She earned her PhD at Groningen University in 1991. She was a research fellow at Groningen University and assistant professor at Stanford University. She is currently a Professor in French linguistics and semantics at Utrecht University.

Her research focuses on cross-linguistic variation in meaning particularly in regards to tense and aspect, negation, bare nominals and indefinite noun phrases. She has also investigated the role of semantics in language evolution, and was involved in the development of bidirectional optimality theory.

== Honors and distinctions ==
She has been the director of the Netherlands Graduate School of linguistics (LOT) and of the Utrecht Institute of Linguistics (OTS). In 2013, she was nominated to membership of the Royal Netherlands Academy of Arts and Sciences (KNAW).

de Swart is an associate editor of the journal Natural Language and Linguistic Theory. She is also a member of the editorial board of Linguistics and Philosophy, Semantics and Pragmatics, Language and Linguistic Compass, Travaux de Linguistique, and the Catalan Journal of Linguistics.

== Selected publications ==
- de Swart, H.E. 2013. Indefiniteness. In M. Aronoff (Eds.), Oxford Bibliographies in Linguistics (pp. 1–26) New York: Oxford University Press.
- Le Bruyn, B.S.W., Que, M. & de Swart, H.E. (2012). The scope of bare nominals. In A. Mari (Eds.), Genericity (pp. 116–139) (24 p.). Oxford University Press.
- de Swart, H.E. 2012. Verbal aspect across languages. In Robert Binnick (Eds.), The Oxford Handbook of Tense and Aspect (pp. 752–780) (28 p.). Oxford: Oxford University Press.
- Hendriks, P., de Hoop, H., Kraemer, I., de Swart, H.E. & Zwarts, J. 2010. Conflicts in Interpretation. (192 p.). London: Equinox Publishing.
- de Swart, Henriëtte and J Zwarts. 2009 “Less form–more meaning: Why bare singular nouns are special,” Lingua.
- Farkas, Donka. Henriëtte de Swart. 2007. The semantics of incorporation: from argument structure to discourse transparency
- de Swart, Henriëtte and Ivan A. Sag. 2002, “Negation And Negative Concord In Romance," Linguistics and Philosophy. 25(4): 373–417.
- de Swart, Henriëtte. 1998. “Aspect shift and coercion,“ Natural Language & Linguistic Theory.
- de Swart, Henriëtte. 1998. Introduction to natural language semantics. CSLI publications.
