= Sylvie Deswarte-Rosa =

Sylvie Deswarte-Rosa (born 1945) is an art historian who specialises in the study of the Renaissance. She has written around a hundred texts and articles on painting, drawing, iconography, art theory, architecture, sculpture, illuminations, etching, typography, history and early European interpretations of art from other continents. She writes in Portuguese, French and Italian. Her most important works explore Portuguese art and culture in the 16th century.

Deswarte-Rosa is a director of research at the Centre National de la Recherche Scientifique.

== Works ==
- Les Enluminures de la "Leitura Nova" (Paris, 1977)
- As Imagens das Idades do Mundo de Francisco de Holanda (Lisbon, 1986)
- Il "Perfetto Cortegiano" D. Miguel da Silva (Rome, 1989)
- Idéias e Imagens em Portugal na Época dos Descobrimentos (Lisbon, 1992)
