= Johannes Hendricus van der Palm =

Dutch politician (1763–1840)

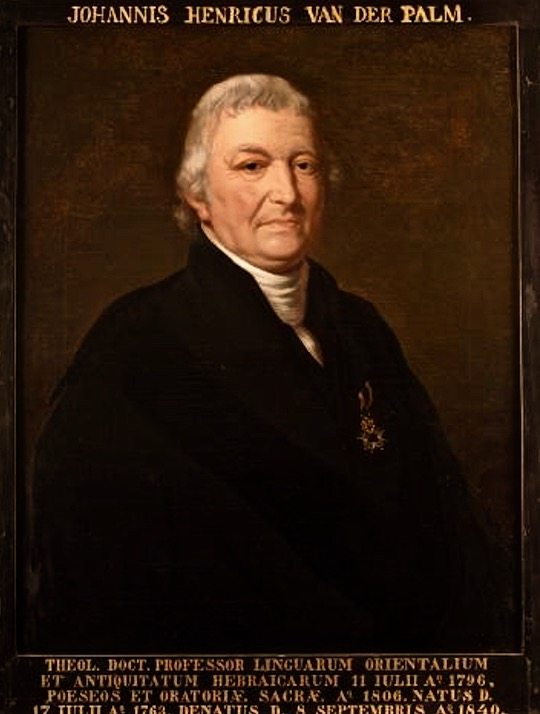
- Portrait of Johannes Henricus van der Palm, Professor of Oriental Languages and Hebrew Antiquities, Leiden University. A gift by members of the family to the university in 1840.
- Born: 17 June 1763; Rotterdam
- Died: 11 September 1840 (aged 77); Leiden
- Burial place: Katwijk aan Zee
- Education: Primary - home education by father Secondary - Gymnasium Erasmianum, Rotterdam, 1774-1778 Tertiary - Leiden University, 1778-1784
- Occupations: Linguist, professor at Leiden University, educationist, theologian, Dutch Reformed Church minister, Bible translator, politician and orator
- Known for: First Dutch Minister (agent) for Education and Bible translator
- Political party: Patriot (Moderate democratic faction)
- Partner: Alida Bussingh (m. 1786, d. 1835)
- Children: Eight, only four reached adulthood
- Parents: Cornelis van der Palm (b. 1733, d. 1789) (father); Magteld van Tonsbergen (b. 1728, d. 1772) (mother)

Johannes Hendricus (Note: Also spelt in some documents as Henricus or Hendrik.) van der Palm (Note: In this Dutch name, the surname is Van der Palm, not Palm.) (17 July 1763 – 8 September 1840) was a Dutch Assyriologist, linguist, professor of (i) oriental languages and Hebrew antiquities and (ii) sacred poetry and rhetoric at Leiden University, educationist, theologian, Dutch Reformed Church minister, Bible translator, politician and orator. He made major contributions in all these areas.

== Life ==
=== Childhood and education ===
Johannes Hendricus van der Palm was the son of Cornelis van der Palm, (Note: Although, according to Nicolaas Beets, he preferred his first name to be spelt as 'Kornelis'.) a school teacher by profession, head of a renowned Rotterdam boarding school who later held a similar position in Delfshaven. Biographer and relative through marriage Nicolaas Beets described the father as a man of "virtue, intelligence, and refinement, possessed of much ability and learning; for his time, a very accomplished linguist, and a not unsuccessful poet."

Van der Palm's mother was Machteld von Tonsbergen, a member of a middle-class family and directly descended from a Knight of Malta who had left the Order at the time of its decline. Beets described her as having the typical characteristics of a Dutch woman, "homely, industrious, very godly." In addition to Johannes Hendricus, there were seven other children, six brothers and a sister, all of whom lived to adulthood and died earlier than him.

Van der Palm's primary education was provided at home by his father, and for secondary education he attended Rotterdam's Gymnasium Erasmianum in the period 1774 – June 1778.

Then aged 15 years, Van der Palm commenced studies through Leiden University focussing first on letteren (liberal arts) (Note: As it was then and remains today, liberal arts, the term derived from the Latin phrase ars liberalis, is the oldest classification of subjects in the European education process. It provided a way in which students were "broadly educated in the social sciences, the natural sciences and the humanities, as well as trained in a particular academic field of specialization called a concentration. In a philosophical sense, the term is built upon the idea that broad education enhances the dignity of each individual. (For a good explanation, read Chapter 3 of King, Margaret L. The Renaissance in Europe. Laurence King Publishing, 2003. ISBN 978-1-85669-374-5. pp. 65–99.)) before moving on to theology. Under the supervision of renowned Orientalist Professor Hendrik Schultens, he submitted his doctorate dissertation in September 1783 and defended it publicly at the end of January in the following year. Titled Ecclesiastes philologic et critice illustratus, it was an examination of the Old Testament book of Ecclesiastes.

According to a report from an unnamed fellow-student, during his time at university Van der Palm demonstrated "a consistent whole of rare qualities, eminent zeal, agreeable intercourse, virtuous conduct, and a character by which he won the hearts of all who enjoyed his acquaintance and society. At the same time, he gave evidences of those "gifts and powers of mind which by constant culture were carried to so great perfection, and which enabled him, even to old age, to maintain the high position attained by him when in the full maturity of his powers." Not at all straitlaced or over-intellectual, though, the report also says that Van der Palm was "lively, fond of visiting, of walking, of bodily exercises, of the theatre, of sports, and especially of playing at golf [sic]. (Note: This translation is incorrect. The game he played was called kolf which is a uniquely Dutch game, usually played indoors and sometimes on ice in Winter in which by four players using sticks closely resembling modern hockey sticks. Some regard it as a forebear of modern golf but there is no universal agreement on that.) which he did almost daily, and at which he was very expert."

=== Early professional life ===
==== Appointment to church ministry ====
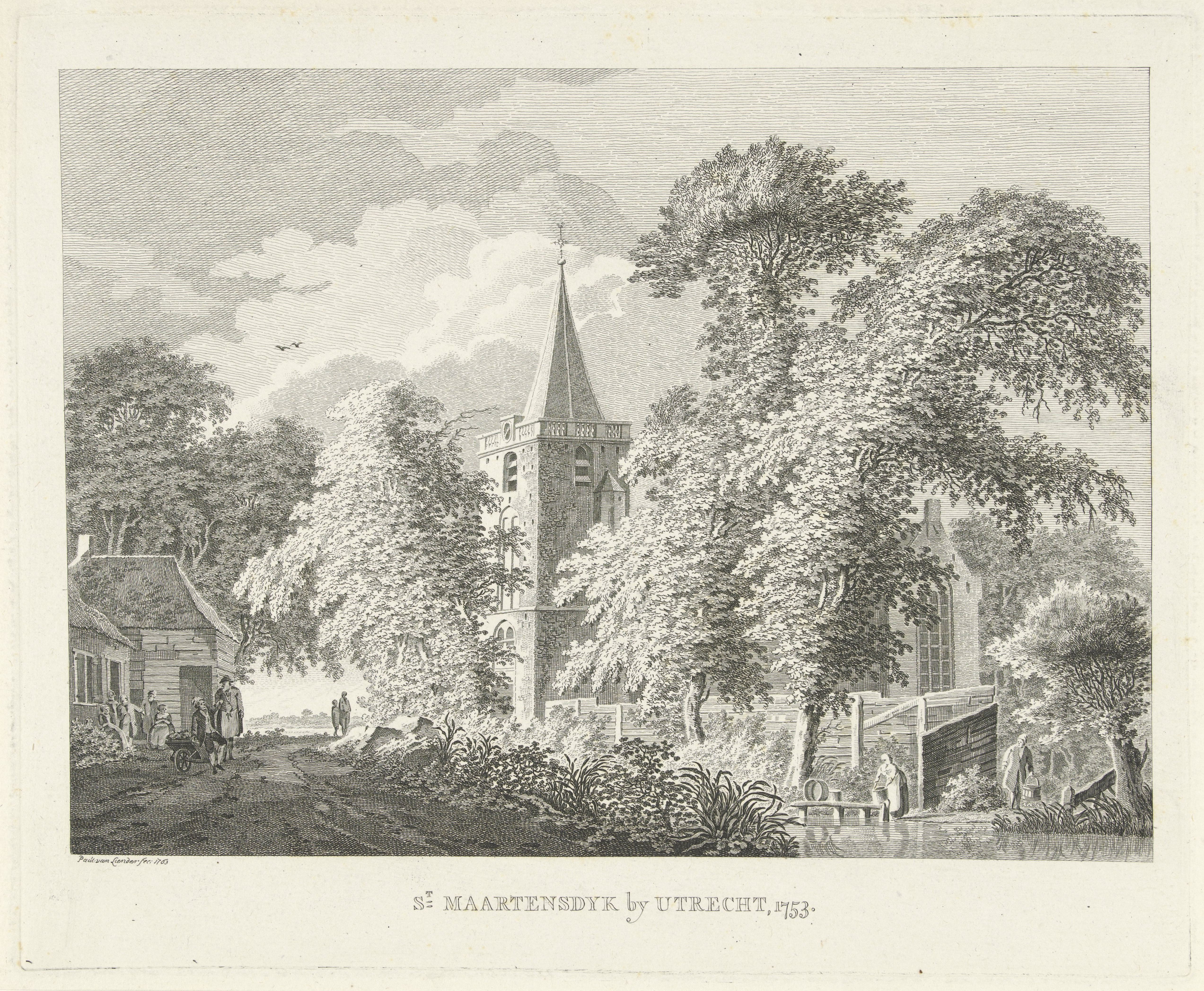
Village View of Maartensdijk, 1753. Etching by Paulus van Liender (1731-1797). From the collection of the Rijksmuseum, Amsterdam.

Van der Palm completed his studies at Leiden University in January 1784 and applied for appointment as a Minister in churches close to Leiden. There were several vacancies, but his progress was delayed because, being only 21 years old, he tended to be viewed as too young. He then started applying further afield in the province of Utrecht, and by December of that year he was fourth in place in a list six candidates being considered by Maartensdijk. Having worked to warm the classis (governing body) there in his favour, and following the necessary assessments, the classis made a formal offer to him and he undertook ministry there in March 1786. In November of that same year, he married Alida Bussingh, the daughter of a then-deceased friend of his from Delfshaven, and she joined him in Maartensdijk.

As Beets reports, "The young minister enjoyed in this charge the greatest esteem and love. "The people had much patience with me," he later said. His preaching was heard with great satisfaction. From Utrecht the people came very frequently to hear him, including students from the university." However, according to Beets, "In one thing the youthful minister felt himself deficient, and that too a very important, perhaps the most important part of the gospel ministry, - pastoral work. "In all uprightness," he subsequently wrote (1791) to a friend, "it is not my case, I venture to say it is not my gift; and I never succeeded in it." (Note: The same opinion was expressed independently by others; for example, one official biographer wrote that after Maartensdijk Van der Palm "never undertook the ministry again, especially because he, a good preacher, was a very poor pastor.")

At that time Van der Palm was involved with the more moderate side of the Patriot movement, a complex group largely inspired by Europe's so-called Enlightenment principles and whose main objectives were the ending of the Stadtholderate (or stewardship) of William V, Prince of Orange, (Note: His Stadholderate had been in demise since 1783 largely because of opposition from the Patriots, and in 1785 he had removed himself and his household from the Hague to Nijmegen in the more remote province of Gelderland.) and the democratisation of the Netherlands after the model of the United States.

They were opposed by an equally-complex group called the Orangists (Note: The words 'Orangist' and 'Orangism derived from the name of the Dutch noble House of Orange which had fulfilled the role of Stadtholder in the Dutch Republic in the period of its operation from 1588 to 1795, with Prince William V of Orange in this role at the time of Van der Palm's life we are discussing here.) whose uniting principle was the preservation of the nobility's role either as an absolute monarch or in a Stadtholderate role as had been set up in one form or another in the Dutch Republic from the time of the Spanish withdrawal in 1581 onwards. (Note: The Netherlands' relationships within the international context were made more complex by the fact that, at the time of the Anglo-French War (1778–1783), the Patriots were pro-French and pro-American and the Orangists were pro-British, an alliance that was also held in reverse.)

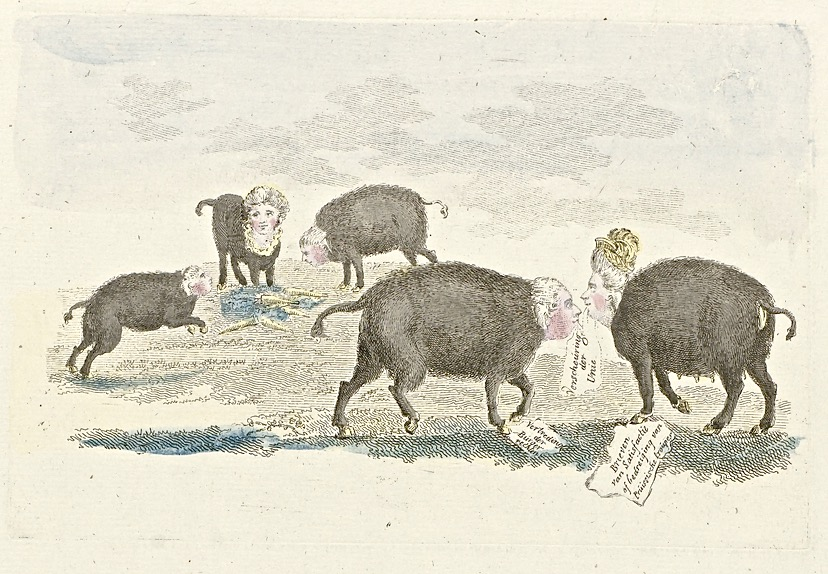
Cartoon of William V and his wife and children as used on a 1787 Patriot leaflet published with the title Het Geldersche Zwynengebroed. From the collection of the Rijksmuseum Amsterdam.

Van der Palm had been raised in a household which strongly supported Patriot principles; he in turn met many of similar mind at university, including Professor Schultens, and then again found himself in the company of many more in Maartensdijk. Beets tells how a close friendship with poet Jacobus Bellamy "had blown the youthful fire of excited patriotism into a great flame" and because Van der Palm was seen participating in civilian weapons exercises, and was even advocating this to others from the pulpit, he was criticised by "several people who were calmer, or who were attached to another party." (Note: By which one assumes Beets meant "another party" to refer to the Orangists.)

In the period 1780-1787, the control of the Orangists and Patriots varied from place to place, and specifically in the area relevant to Van der Palm, the Patriots held power in the city of Utrecht while the surrounding province was controlled by the Orangists. Civil war escalated in that period; but the climax arrived in September 1787 when the Prussian army invaded at the order of King Frederick William II of Prussia, allegedly as an angry response to the way his sister, Princess Wilhelmina of Prussia, wife of Prince William V, had been arrested by Patriots while on her way to the Hague to argue the case for her husband's reinstallment as Stadtholder. However, she had been released two days later, and the more likely reasons for King Frederick William's action were to assist the Orangists in opposing the Patriots and to restore Prince William to the Stadtholderate. (Note: Although Prince William himself, referred to as gun-shy, had indicated that he would only return to the Stadtholderate if invited.) Ultimately, Prussia was successful, many Patriots were driven into exile, and Prince William V was restored, briefly, as Stadtholder.

Once the Prussian invasion began, and he was already under attack not so much from residents of his own town as Orangists from Bunschoten, Van der Palm and his wife fled (Note: Van der Palm was not alone having to take flight from the combined Prussian-Orangist forces. There were a number of other Ministers who had actively supported the Patriot principles and therefore faced similar pressure.) on 16 September, going to Monster in South Holland where his brother-in-law Johannes Wilhelmus Bussingh was Minister. Despite appeals from some for him to return to Maartensdijk, there was opposition from others; but regardless, Van der Palm had no desire to do so, he tendered his resignation on 30 October, informal acceptance was received on 4 November, and formal release in writing was sent on 12 March 1788. He was 24 years old.

==== Movement away from ministry ====
Remaining in Monster for the time being, Van der Palm considered his next options which included studying medicine in Leiden, or returning to his former position in Maartensdijk, when in 1787 an answer emerged through the action of Schultens who had been approached about the suitability of another former student for appointment to a position and had, in response and without referral to Van der Palm, put his name forward as equally suitable. The position was in the household of wealthy nobleman Johan Adriaan (Note: Adriaen in some sources.) van de Perre.

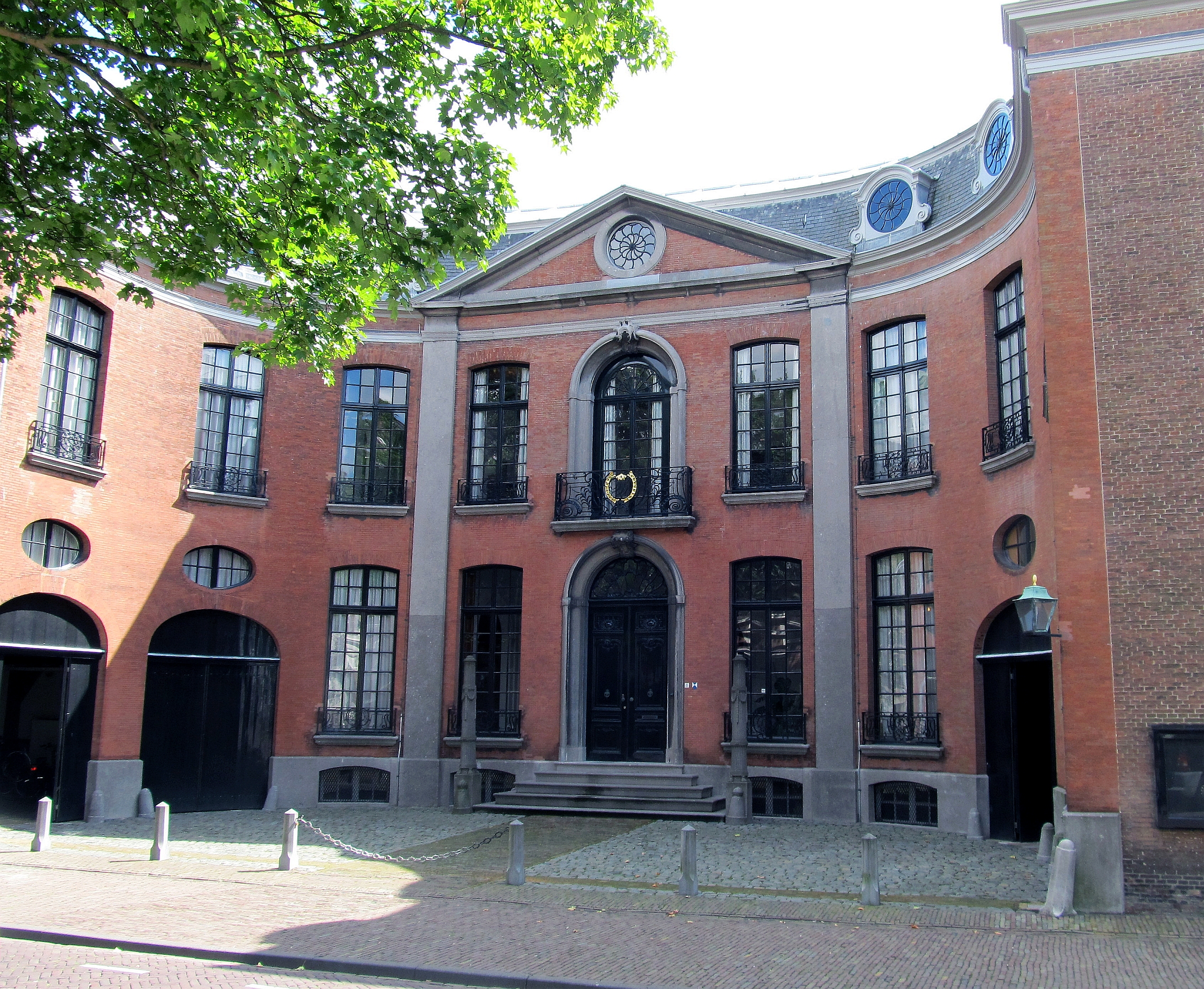
De Commanderij, now called Van de Perrehuis, Middelburg

At this time, Van de Perre was 51 years old and living in a 'palatial' (Note: According to the descriptive used by many.) house called De Commanderij (Note: Now known as Van de Perrehuis.) which he and his wife Jacoba van den Brande had built (Note: The architect was Jan Pieter van Baurscheit the Younger.) in his birthplace Middelburg within the province of Zeeland. He held the title Lord of Nieuwerve and Welsingen, (Note: Also called at different times Welzinge, Welsinge and Welsinghen.) was the leader of the Orangist movement in his area, and in his professional life had served as a magistrate, before being appointed as chief magistrate whereby he also became representative of Prince William V in his role as Stadtholder of Walcheren, (Note: Walcheren is an island on which Middelburg is located.) a member of the Council of Zeeland, and representative of the province to the States-General. (Note: The States-General (Staten-Generaal) was the central body which operated within the Dutch Republic (Republiek der Verenigde Nederlanden) in the period 1588–1795. It was made up of representatives of the seven northern Dutch provinces constituted within the Republic, and each province had one vote in the decision-making process.)

By the end of 1778 Van de Perre had resigned from all these positions so he could pursue his personal interests, especially in the sciences. He was an avid collector of arts objects, had already developed a large, comprehensive library, set up a science museum (Note: Known eventually as the Museum Medioburgense, its foundation was carried out in association with the Zeeland Society of Sciences of which Van de Perre was a founding member. In its early years the main focuses of the museum were medicine, theology and applied science, later expanding into other areas. It attracted strong support from the States of Zeeland who saw its function as being beneficial to the region. The Society still operates and was given the title 'Royal' in the 20th century.) and engaged in scientific research (Note: For example, he was the first person to launch a balloon as part of his experiments in meteorology.) (much of it in collaboration with his wife whose specific interest was physics). (Note: Van de Perre assisted her in founding the Natuurkundig Genootschap der Dames te Middelburg (Physics Society of Women in Middelburg) and often gave lectures at its meetings.) He was also a charitable and generous man who frequently gave money to assist people in poverty, and he had a strong commitment to providing education especially for those to whom this was normally inaccessible.

In 1787 Van de Perre sought to appoint a person who would be able to maintain the library and museum, assist with his research, make the museum available to the general public, and at the same time perform the role of household chaplain. Van der Palm was appointed and took up duty in early 1788, being paid at the rate of 1,000 guilders per year plus expenses and a free house. (Note: In many sources comments are made about the surprising fact that a committed Orangist like Van de Perre would choose to appoint and equally-committed Patriot to his household. Perhaps it speaks as much of Van de Perre's tolerance, open-mindedness and equitability as it does of Van der Palm's skills that this should happen. Although Beets points out that a condition of the appointment was that Van der Palm never use his work as an opportunity to advocate his political points of view.) (Note: Some members of the Van de Perre family were critical of this arrangement on the grounds that Van der Palm was being over-indulged by his employer, especially because he was spending some of his time pursuing his own interests.) He continued in the position after Van de Perre's death in April 1790, ending after the death of Van de Perre's widow in 1794. At that time and aged 31, Van der Palm became financially independent due to a legacy he had received from his late employer.

Because it is relevant to his future career, one important outcome of Van der Palm's time in this position arose from his work as chaplain. A large worship place was set up at De Commanderij and services led by Van der Palm were held there every Sunday afternoon. These were attended by the entire family and household staff as well as people who lived nearby. The preparation of sermons led Van der Palm to engage in detailed exegesis of scripture along with critical studies and analyses of entire books of the Bible.

An early result was the publication in 1791 of a book entitled Eenige Liederen van David, vertaald en opgehelderd, door JH van der Palm. (Some Songs of David, translated and clarified, by J. H. van der Palm) Given this and the other biblical analysis Van der Palm was carrying out at this time, the foundation was already being laid for his later translation of the entire Bible.

==== Transition to public life ====
Prince William V's final demise as Stadtholder began in 1793 when he joined the First Coalition against the newly-emerged French First Republic, participating in a struggle which had already begun in the previous year and continued until 1795 when the French Army, assisted by the Patriots who had been exiled in France and various revolutionaries who had remained in the Netherlands, (Note: Refer, for example, to an analysis of the Batavian Revolution in Amsterdam.) finally marched into Amsterdam on 19 January, and Prince William V and his household fled into exile in Britain around midnight the day before.

The old Dutch Republic was immediately replaced by a unitary state named the Bataafse Republiek (Batavian Republic) as a sister republic of the French Republic. Not long after, the old States-General was replaced temporarily by the Provisional Representatives of the People of Holland which operated as the central governing body until the new National Assembly was formed and held its first meeting in 1796. This assembly's operation was affected by highly opposed parties along with many others who could be placed somewhere in a spectrum between one side or the other depending on the matter being debated. A difficult topic was that of the constitution which was not put in place until 1797.

Beets says that Van der Palm and two other Zeeland citizens, wanting to avoid domination by the French or their functionaries from the centre of government, held a public meeting in Middelburg on 7 February 1795 at which Van der Palm outlined its objectives. An organisation was formed, gave itself the title Middelburgse Comité Révolutionair (Middelburg Revolutionary Committee), and Van der Palm was appointed as its leader. Also in 1795–1796 he regularly wrote for and sometimes edited a weekly magazine called De Vriend des Volks (The People's Friend) whose objective was to monitor the needs of Zeelanders and propose ways in which these could be addressed. Then when the old States-General was replaced by the Provisional Representatives he was sent to represent the people of Zeeland.

==== First appointment to Leiden University ====
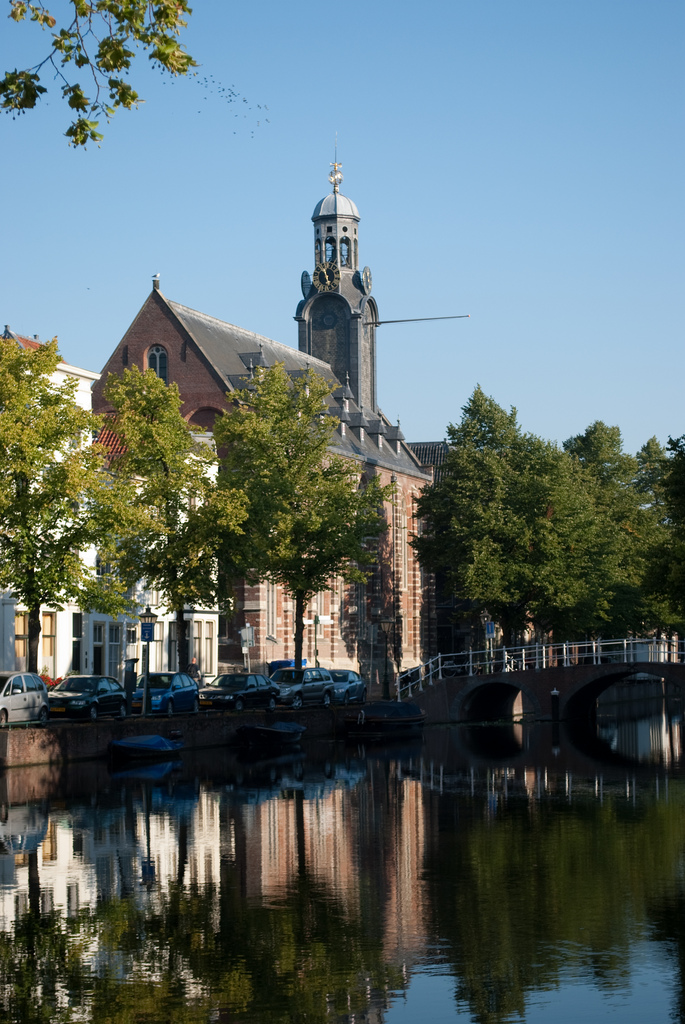
The Academy Building (Academiegebouw), the oldest remaining structure at the University of Leiden. This was in use during Van der Palm's entire involvement with the university.

In June 1796 (Note: Beets claims that Van der Palm was approached about this position in early 1796 and that he declined.(p. 52). This appears to be contradictory to the university's records which show the appointment as being made on 1 December 1795 and Van der Palm's oration being delivered on 11 June 1796.) Van der Palm was appointed as Professor of Oriental Literature and Antiquities (Note: Beets, quoting Van der Palm's correspondence with the university's curators shows the writer saying, "Your letter, informing me of my appointment as Professor of Oriental Literature and Antiquities in the University of Leyden, has been received …") (Note: His disciplines are shown by Leiden University to have been Oostersche Talen en Hebreeuwsche Oudheden (Eastern Languages and Hebrew Antiquities).) at Leiden University.

Regarding Van der Palm's actual focus on teaching, Beets says that he "was not fond of the more profound, philosophical study of language, and linguistics had for him no attractiveness. He prized the knowledge of different languages for the books that were written in them, and studied them as much as was necessary to enable him thoroughly to understand them, and clearly to explain them to others. As professor in the Oriental department, he gave principally three lectures of general utility: on Hebrew grammar, Hebrew antiquities, and the philologico-critical investigation of the books of the Old Testament." It could be assumed from this that, while he was a linguist of note and part of his reputation is built on this, the actual teaching of languages that fell within the field of his professorship must have been allocated to other staff. (Note: Indeed, the name of Hendrik Arent Hamaker has emerged as a contemporary and close colleague of Van der Palm's during his second period at Leiden University. A specialist in oriental languages especially Arabic, his involvement with Leiden began in 1817 and his full professorship in oriental languages ran from 1822 to 1835. Beets says he and Van der Palm shared the teaching load of Hebrew grammar while Hamaker carried the full load of Arabic. This allowed Van der Palm to concentrate on his specialty of philologico-critical investigation, especially of books of the Old Testament.)

In 1798 he was elected as the university's Rector Magnificus (Note: In the Netherlands' universities the Rector Magnificus is the most senior academic position, always held by a person holding a professorship, from which the holder is responsible for administrative responsibilities, under whose authority academic appointments and promotions are made, and to whom orations are addressed by those being admitted to professorial chairs.) a position he held until 1799 when he left to undertake work elsewhere.

=== Mature years ===
==== Politics ====
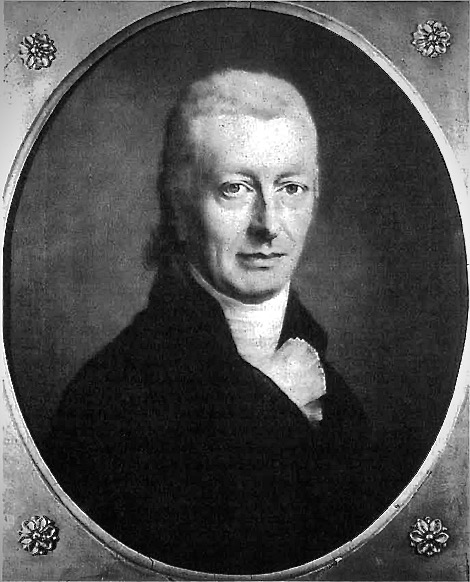
Portrait of Van der Palm attributed to Dutch artist Taco Scheltema and probably painted between 1801 and 1805.

Under the influence of Enlightenment principles, this period was immediately preceded by and continued with an emerging new model of national identity and order. For the Dutch, it included a movement against the fragmented and stagnant old Dutch Republic and its replacement, in the mind of some, by a modern, unified nation built on a stronger sense of shared citizenship and common purpose.

One core element was the idea that education was the need and right of all children. In the Netherlands, "Because education was … necessary in achieving patriotism and citizenship for all, these adherents of the new Dutch Enlightenment republicanism, in great majority moderate Protestants, developed a new pedagogical discourse." Given the period of this debate and this writer's use of the words "moderate Protestants", it can be seen why Van der Palm would have been an enthusiastic participant and that his views both as a Patriot and an educationist would have prepared him well to perform this role as education policy-maker in the new republic. (Note: For a detailed analysis of Dutch education policy and practice at this time and in the periods immediately before and after, see Glenn 1987, pp. 87–141, 235–242, 513–524.) Not all turned out as Van der Palm and others of like-mind would have hoped.

In 1799 Van der Palm succeeded Theodorus van Kooten as agent voor Nationale Opvoeding (Minister for National Education), first in the Batavian Republic and then the "Bataafs Gemenebest" (Batavian Commonwealth) after its change of name in 1801, and held it until December 1801. In October 1801 he was given the additional interim position of agent voor Nationale Economie (Minister of the National Economy), ceasing both this and his title as Minister for National Education on 8 December of that same year after being appointed as a member of the Raad voor Binnenlandse Zaken (Council for Home Affairs) with special responsibility for education and ecclesiastical affairs.

From his official positions Van der Palm wrote copious documents on a whole range of subjects. Quite apart from education, he was interested in refinement of the constitution, law reform, the structure and operation of government departments and authorities, raising the standards of public health, and so on. His correspondence has been well preserved and readily accessible to anyone who wants to read further. (See Bibliography below.)

The Batavian Republic's first national school act was drawn up in 1801 by Van der Palm in conjunction with his assistant Adriaan van den Ende. The gloomy picture they faced, one of indifference, opposition to change, factionalism and economic woes, is well described in the address Van der Palm gave to his first assembly of school inspectors that year:

"The mode of instruction prevalent in the schools is servile and mechanical, adapted not to excite in the breasts of the children a desire of learning, but to extinguish it; not to develop their mental powers, but to blunt them for the remainder of their lives; not to fill their memories with the knowledge of useful things, but with confused sounds. This mode of instruction has, however, as its zealous supporters, the countless multitude of those who cling tenaciously to what is old, and regard as a crime the desire of being wiser than their fathers; the text-books of the schools, useless as to the purpose which they should subserve, uninteresting and prolix, have, however, by reason of their contents and origin, a venerable appearance in the eyes of many, who regard it as no less than sacrilege to discard these and substitute others in their place. Among the parents we meet with extreme indifference as to the training of their offspring, in their minds the grossest prejudices, and in their families all the consequences of a neglected education; in church sessions a spirit of opposition, as quickly as the care of important matters, which it is impossible for them to manage, is withdrawn from their authority; in the clergy, dependence, timidity, or bigotry, all equally fatal to the reformation of the schools, — of the schools, whose locality alone not unfrequently presents an insuperable obstacle to their most necessary improvement. Add to this the effects of civil and religious factions, and the alienations which they engender; the almost general discontent, arising from the calamity of the times still more than from the essential defects of our form of government; and the state of the public treasury, which, exhausted by an amazingly expensive land force, and by the national debt, which has increased far beyond our ability, can offer no effectual assistance by which otherwise the greatest and most numerous grievances might perhaps be alleviated. With what prospect, might one well exclaim, with what prospect at all favorable can one undertake the work of school improvement, or comfort himself in the ungrateful office of inspector of schools?

Further legislation was proposed in 1803 and 1806. Dekker notes that the "dream of these two men was to build a national system, governed from and financed by the central government, responsible for the quality of both the curriculum and the schoolmasters."

In reality, however, the Batavian Republic was slow in bringing the details of these plans to fruition, and Dekker comments that Van der Palm "showed himself a pragmatic and opportunistic administrator. When it became clear to him that the ambitious blueprints and dreams could not be realized, he modified them into do-able measures. For example, he cancelled the national school free for the poor program, introduced by himself, for financial reasons; as a result, school attendance immediately diminished."

Two of Van der Palm's notable achievements were initiated in 1801 when he approached Leiden University's Professor of Dutch Language Matthijs Siegenbeek to establish a uniform system of Dutch spelling. (Note: The complex nature of the Dutch language and its generational changes are outlined in History of Dutch orthography.) Siegenbeek agreed and his system was officially introduced on 18 December 1804. In turn, Siegenbeek contacted Pieter (Petrus) Weiland about composing a standardised form of Dutch grammar and he agreed. As the foreword of the text indicates, Van der Palm and other members of government were involved in the assessment of the draft document and its final approval, and the document was sent for printing at government expense in 105.

Van der Palm's involvement with government ended in May 1805 when the Council for Home Affairs was abolished. As Beets reveals, quoting Van der Palm himself, his time in politics was not entirely rewarding:

"Such were my views of my office, when I labored for a government in whose employ no effectual support, little encouragement, was experienced, and in which want of fixed principles, at least in this department, and an undue regard to personal considerations, rendered uncertain the issue of all that was undertaken. How great my attachment to my office might have been, under a more energetic, united, worthy government, inspiring at the same time greater attachment and respect, it is not for me to determine; how much greater zeal and activity I should then have been able to exhibit, I have sometimes indeed ventured to conjecture, when this prospect opened up to my view."

He received a state pension until his return to Leiden University.

==== Return to Leiden University ====
In 1806, at the age of 43, Van der Palm returned to a professorship at Leiden University, this time in the fields of sacred poetry and rhetoric. His preference would have been his original professorship in oriental literature and antiquities, but in his absence this had been occupied from 1794 by Sebald Fulco Rau who was also Professor of Theology as of 1797, (Note: Beets incorrectly claims that Rau was actually the Professor of Sacred Poetry and Rhetoric, but this is contraditcted by other sources.) and Van der Palm accepted sacred poetry and rhetoric as an alternative. He took up his professorship on 26 September of that year, delivering an oration entitled De Oratore Sacro Litterarum Divinarum Interprete (On the Sacred Orator, An Expositor of the Holy Scriptures). (Note: As quoted by Beets, Professor Siegenbeek outlined the content of this speech thus: "In it he marked out for the ministers of religion the only way by which they can attain the high and holy end of sacred eloquence; the way, in which, as formerly, so especially afterwards, he preceded them in the most illustrious manner. In his lectures on sacred eloquence he expanded the hints and instructions contained in this discourse, illustrated them by well-selected examples, and thus gave his hearers a text-book of sacred eloquence, which, it is greatly to be lamented, has been confined to the circle of his pupils. Sometimes he varied those lectures, by expounding for the benefit of his hearers, in his peculiarly rich, tasteful, and felicitous manner, portions of the Holy Scriptures, with a special view to the use to be made of them by the sacred orator. I may mention for example the principal parables of the Saviour, respecting which it were also to be desired, that his more copious illustrations of them had not remained the precious possession of his private hearers.")

In 1805, however, Rau was reprimanded by the university because of his political opinions and his professorship was restricted to theology, meaning that responsibilities for oriental literature and antiquities were returned to Van der Palm while also continuing to hold sacred poetry and rhetoric.

Van der Palm was appointed as University Preacher in 1807, a position in which he continued until 1815 (Note: Beets reports that his many sermons were published for distribution to the public with several volumes reaching four editions. At that point, the publishers judged it as over-distribution; but as Beets points out, "in spite of the great number in circulation, the public was not yet satisfied.") when the appointment was annulled because under changes of the law it was required that such positions should only be held by professors of theology. After his sermon at the start of the 1812 academic year, Van der Palm was called to account for not paying tribute to Emperor Napoléon Bonaparte.

Van der Palm was appointed for a second time as Rector Magnificus in 1818 and held the position into 1819. Then in 1820, the current holder of the theology professorship, Johannes van Voorst was appointed as university librarian and Van der Palm was offered a return to the position as University Preacher. However, he declined that offer in view of the weight of other work (his focus on the translation of the Bible being the most time-consuming).

==== Re-emergence of the House of Orange ====
In the midst of all this, the House of Orange continued to demonstrate interest in re-establishing its power, particularly through Prince William Frederick, the eldest son of Prince William V who was therefore Erfprins Hereditary Prince. As a child he had grown up in the Dutch Republic and his education was centred around the military arts. He also studied briefly at Leiden University but was taken away from it in 1790 when his father appointed him to the rank of general in the State Army and a member of the State Council of the Netherlands. He then participated in a number of major battles against the French Republic until that country asserted its power and successfully invaded the Netherlands and the royal family was forced into exile.

Prince William's involvement in warfare continued over several years, with varying degrees of success. In the meantime, the Batavian Commonwealth's government and society continued to be impaired by factionalism and inefficiency (the same problems that led Van der Palm to withdraw from public life and return to teaching at Leiden University) along with growing dissent towards the government. The turning point was Napoleon's defeat at Leipzig in October 1813 followed by withdrawal of French troops from everywhere in Europe including the Netherlands.

The following month former Orangists and Patriots joined forces to create a new government, and in December they welcomed the return of Prince William, this time with the old north and south portions of the Low Countries united as one nation. (Note: At a glance, the unification of former Orangists and Patriots under a House of Orange monarch seems odd; but as one commentator has written, "William I described himself as the natural successor of Charles V, with a mission to complete the aborted attempts of state formation in the Netherlands in the sixteenth century. However the Burgundian myth [that is, of a Burgundian pan-Netherlandish Golden Age] never really took hold as a dominant political memory in the new kingdom.… William's attitude toward the problematic Batavian and Neopolnic past can be described as an implicit politics of forgetting or oubli.") At the urge of other nations at the Congress of Vienna the kingdom of the Netherlands was finally declared by Prince William on 16 March 1815 and his title then became King of the Netherlands and Duke of Luxembourg. (Note: The marriage of north and south was never entirely happy and led to the south being under-represented in the new States GeneraL Other factors include the fact that the north was occupied largely of Dutch-speaking Protestants while those in the south were mostly Dutch-speaking Flemings and French-speaking Walloons who were predominantly Catholic. By 1830, the Belgian Revolution was underway and the outcome was the secession of the southern provinces and the formation of the Kingdom of Belgium under its own monarch.)

Beets says that Van der Palm "rejoiced in the revolution of 1813, and attached himself, with the entire nation, fully and sincerely to the House of Orange. Of this his patriotic utterance in 1813, his religious observation of the joyful prospects of the Netherlands, his poetic effusion, "The Peace of Europe" in 1814, his sermon to excite Christian heroism in 1815, and in 1816 his Historical and rhetorical account of the emancipation of the Netherlands, in the year 1813, furnish abundant proofs." A sermon given in Leiden's Pieterskerk in 1824 ended with the words, "What will always be our watchword? Union: For God, the Fatherland, and Orange!"

Contrast that with his allegiance to the moderate Patriot cause prior to the Prussian invasion of 1787, his submission to the restrictions imposed by Van de Perre, and his political career in the Batavian Republic-cum-Commonwealth, some might assume that Van der Palm was prepared to align himself with the latest political fad at any one time. But the other side of the picture could be as expressed here: "Thus amid various vicissitudes forty-three years of his life had passed away. … In all this he is actuated, less by a becoming ambition, than by an ardent desire to be useful to his country." The constant picture of Van der Palm is that his primary objectives were positive discourse, harmonious social interaction, concordance and peace, and therefore hypocritical game-playing, aggressive self-promotion and grandiose point-scoring could never play any role in achieving good outcomes.

==== Retirement ====
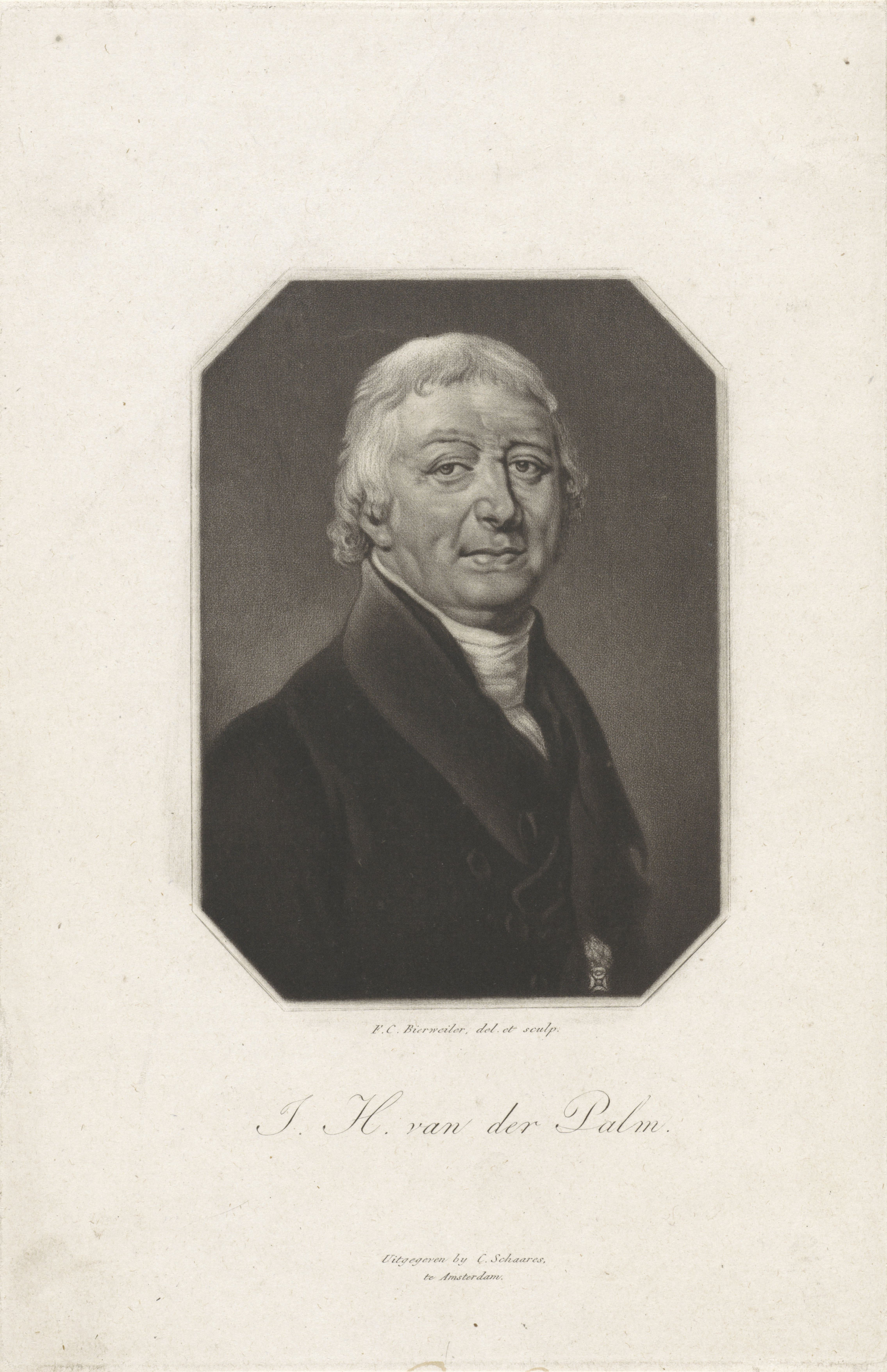
Johannes Hendricus van der Palm as he was late in his life. A knighthood insignia is shown on the lapel. From the collection of the Rijksmuseum.

He went into retirement in 1833 at the age of 70, although, as is reported, he went on lecturing right up to 1838. He and his wife remained in Leiden until their deaths.

==== Family life ====
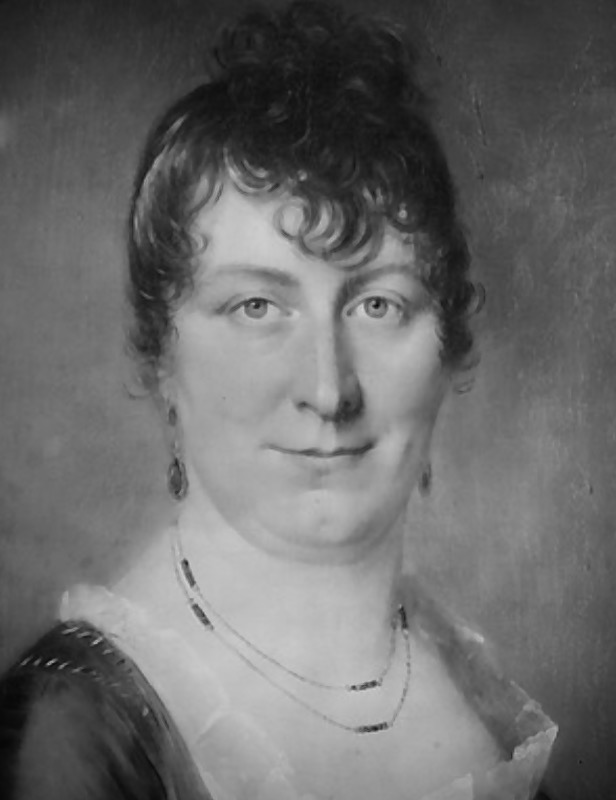
Detail of a portrait of Alida van der Palm (née Bussingh) attributed to Dutch artist Taco Scheltema

Evidence shows Van der Palm's marriage as being entirely happy: "A most tender husband, he lived wholly in and for his lovely, gentle, pious wife, who, even with less prosperity, would have made the happiness of his life complete."

The same is said of his approach to fatherhood: "In no one was the paternal character more perfectly expressed; even without being allied to him by blood, one could hardly refrain from calling him father. Surrounded by his children and grandchildren, he seemed truly a patriarch of the olden time; to promote their happiness, to augment their pleasure, to gather them joyous and sportive around him, was the delight of his life. He ever found time in the midst of his most serious employments, yea, during the last years of his life, amid weakness and suffering, to devise plans for their amusement, to rejoice them with presents, to entertain them, and by great and small attentions of every kind to show how largely they shared in the affections of his heart; to participate in their pleasures, in their sports, to laugh at their innocent folly, and to take an interest in what they deemed important, though it had become far beneath his attention.

During his entire time in Leiden, Van der Palm never owned a house. As Beets candidly reports, "He attached no special value to wealth … He was a poor financier, did not approve of hoarding up, and was very liberal." To which he adds a quote: "The horoscope which I drew when a boy," he remarked, "contained in it that I should enjoy much, but accumulate little." However, he did buy a country residence in Soeterwoude (now Zoeterwoude-Dorp) south of Leiden, where he converted a summer-house into a study and developed a diverse fruit garden.

Beets says Van der Palm was an immensely hospitable host who always welcomed people into his home. "His house was a scene of undisturbed peace, joy, and happiness, and he knew how to imbue with his own spirit all who surrounded him, even to his servants. The rights of each, the pleasures of each, were respected and regarded by him with the utmost care.

The first three of Van der Palm's sons died early in their lives: the first was stillborn in May, 1789; the second died in November 1797 before his baptism; and the third, Jan Willem, was born in November 1798 and, with another child, was killed at school by a falling beam in 1807. His fourth son, born in 1802 and named Henrick Albert Schultens in tribute to his professor and friend, died at the age of 18 after a brief illness and was buried at Katwijk aan Zee's Zuidstraat cemetery where Van der Palm and his wife would also be buried.

His first child to live to full adulthood and first daughter was born in 1790, named Cornelia Mathilda, and later married Pieter Loopuyt (Loopuijt), a wealthy banker and member of the Eerste Kamer (Upper House of the States-General). Jacoba Elizabeth, his second daughter, was born in 1791 and later married Dirk Jonkeer van Foreest, a member of the Tweede Kamer (Lower House of the States-General).

His third daughter, Elizabeth Henrietta, was born in 1794 and never married. She was followed by Adelaïda Louise who was born in 1806 and married Gillis André de la Porte founder and director of an insurance company and later member of the Arnhem City Council. His last daughter, Anna Catharina, was born in 1808 and never married.

His wife Aleida died in 1835, five years before Van der Palm himself.

=== Honours, death and commemorations ===
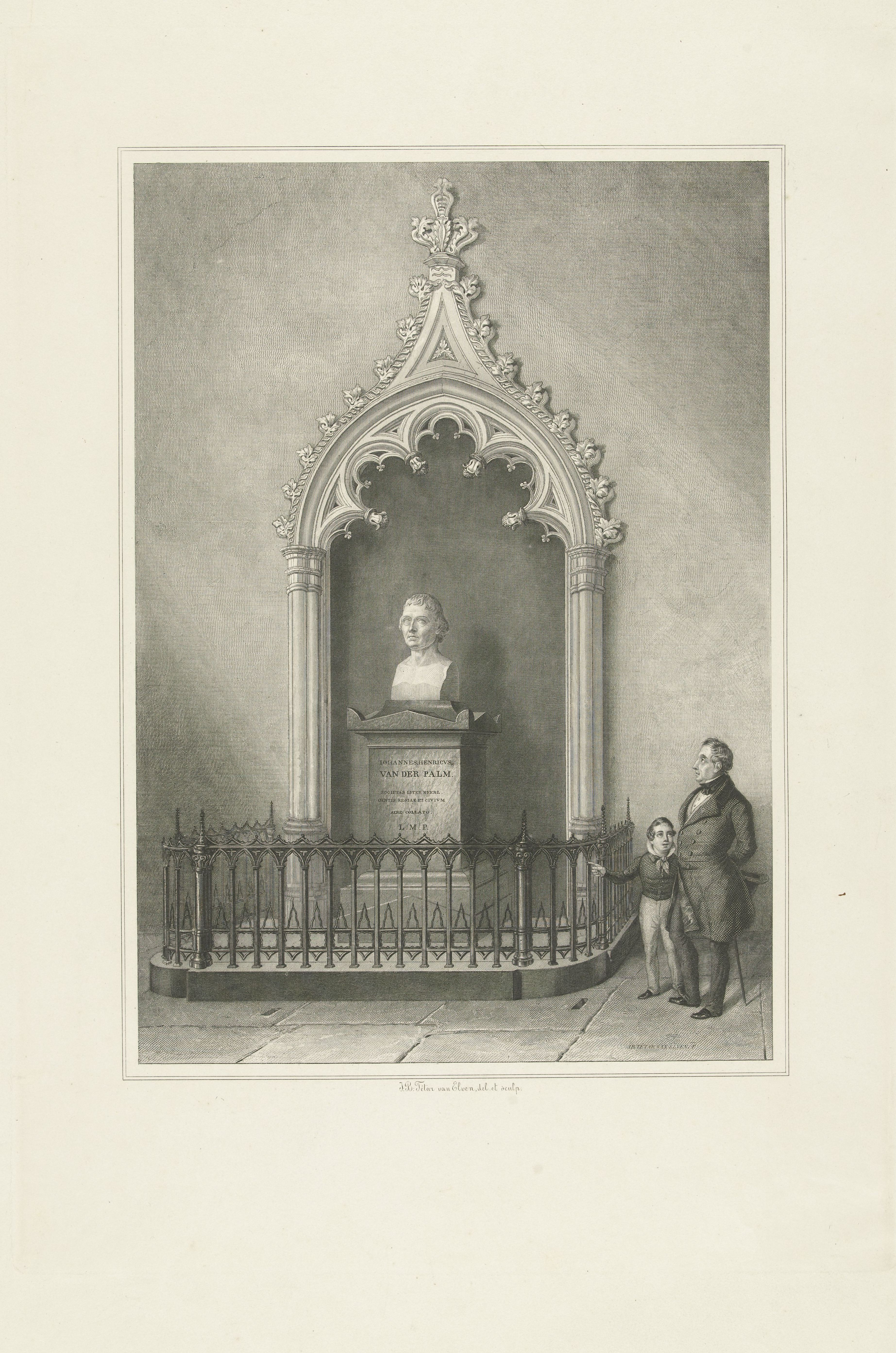
Monument to Johannes van der Palm erected in the Pieterskerk, Leiden.

King Louis 1 founded the Koninklijk Instituut van Wetenschappen, Letterkunde en Schoone Kunsten (Royal Academy of Sciences, Literature and the Arts) in 1808 and immediately awarded membership to Van der Palm. In 1812 Leiden University recognised his services by granting him an honoris causa degree of Doctor of Divinity. In 1822 he received a diploma from the Société Asiatique (Asiatic Society) in Paris for his longtime association with them as Associé-Correspondant (Associate Correspondent). The Maatschappij der Nederlandse Letterkunde (Society of Dutch Literature) paid tribute in 1830 for his half-century of services to the development of literature by awarding him a gold medal.

Successive civilian honours included: Knight (Ridder) in the Order of the Union, awarded in 1808 by King Louis 1; Knight in the Order of the Reunion, awarded in 1812 by Emperor Napoleon to replace the previous honour; and Knight in the Order of the Netherlands Lion, awarded in 1816 by King William I.

He died in 1840 aged 77 and was buried alongside his wife, son and daughter in the cemetery of the Dutch Reformed Church, Zuidstraat, Katwijk aan Zee. The church reports that their tombstones have been destroyed by "a protracted process of salinisation and erosion as a result of continuous rain and strong west wind in the coastal village."

In 1841 the family donated to Leiden University the portrait illustrated at the head of this page. This has remained as part of the university's collection and is on display in the Academiegebouw.

Nicolaas Beets, husband of Van der Palm's granddaughter Aleide van Foreest, wrote in 1842 the biography "Leven en karakter" frequently quoted throughout this article.

In 1843 a neo-Gothic monument designed and made by Flemish sculptor Louis Royer was erected by the Maatschappij der Nederlandse Letterkunde (Society of Dutch Literature) in the Pieterskerk, Leiden.

A decision was made by the Rotterdam authorities on 1 February 1910 to name Van der Palmstraat in his honour. There are also streets named after him in other parts of the Netherlands.

== Theological views ==
The climate of Van der Palm's life was characterised by social changes which brought with them broad challenges, including those to the function and operation of religion. Taking these into account helps us to understand how and why his theological views were developed.

Although prior to 1795 the Dutch Reformed Church (Nederduits(ch)e Gereformeerde Kerk as it was then known) had not been adopted as a state church, it had been the church to which the House of Orange belonged, and with the majority of the population as adherents, it still held a privileged position within the social structure and government. So, for example, under the law any person holding a government position was required to be a member of the Reformed Church, and in the process this allowed the Reformed Church to remain a dominant if unofficial force within the functioning of secular society. As a result, and despite a few exceptions, some other groups felt isolated, especially when it came to participating in local, regional and state government, civil service or the judiciary. This favourable position was largely deconstructed, at least at government level, during the period of Napoleonic rule, although this was not uniform throughout Dutch society and there were still many who could see no need for change.

In the previous century or more, waves of Reformist movements (Note: See History of religion in the Netherlands.) and divisions within the Reformed Church had already emerged. Even more significantly, there had already been a massive intake of immigrants: refugee Huguenots from France and Puritans from England, increasing numbers of Sephardi and Ashkenazi Jews (although Jewish people had been living there since the time of the Roman invasion.

For these and other reasons, at this time Dutch society was possibly the most culturally diverse in Europe. Incorrectly, some writers have made unqualified claims that Dutch society in this period was highly tolerant because these various religio-ethnic subgroups respected each other and their rights to live in accordance with their beliefs and traditions. (Note: Take, for example, this glib statement in an historical overview: "Although Calvinist communities elsewhere incline to intolerance (New England, for example), the Dutch remain true to their republic's founding declaration in the 1579 Union of Utrecht- that "every citizen should remain free in his religion, and no man may be molested or questioned on the subject of divine worship." The freedom which they originally claimed for themselves, these Calvinists extend with admirable consistency to others.") Others explain that, while the claim of religious tolerance is a part of Dutch national pride, examination of the Dutch Republic's Golden Age and later reveals a different picture. (Note: For an excellent overview of tolerance in this period, see Schuyt, Kees. "Tolerance and democracy". Dutch Culture in a European Perspective: Accounting for the Past: 1650-2000. Dutch Culture in a European Perspective, Volume 5. Edited by Douwe Fokkema and Frans Grijzenhout. Translated by Paul Vincent. Uitgeverij Van Gorcum, 2004. pp.113–132. ISBN 978-90-232-3967-3. For an examination of 17th century Dutch Calvinist's approach to religious diversity, see Spaans, Jo. "Religious Policies in the Seventeenth-Century Dutch Republic". Calvinism and Religious Toleration in the Dutch Golden Age. Edited by Ronnie Po-chia Hsia and Henk van Nierop. Cambridge University Press, 2002. pp. 72-86. This source examines the experience of Catholics Parker: Charles H., Faith on the Margins: Catholics and Catholicism in the Dutch Golden Age. Harvard University Press, 2008. ISBN 978-0-674-02662-9. The experience of Jewish immigrants in Dutch society is examined in Ruiter, Jan Jaap de. Jews in the Netherlands and their languages. "Tilburg Papers in Culture Studies, Paper 116", 2014. Accessed 10 February 2018.) (Note: As one analyst points out, "The dominant Protestants did not accept Catholics – their enemies in the Reformation and in the war against Spain – and Jews as equals in the sense of the second definition of tolerance, but they tolerated them in the sense of the first definition and thus allowed them to practice their religion – even if the Catholics had to hide their churches in places like Amsterdam. This indulgence seems not to have been guided by any high principle of tolerance, but by pragmatism: Foreigners, whatever their religion, were good for the economy, and the same was true for peaceful coexistence instead of conflict. Moreover, elite Dutch merchants had learned to bargain and negotiate and become used to apply these practices also in politics. In pragmatic politics, nobody owns the truth; what is true has to be agreed upon, and when an agreement cannot be reached, it must still be possible to coexist according to the principle of live and let live.") (Note: In a period when many believed that a formal relationship between the state and a particular denomination of religion was both beneficial and necessary, and a number of European states had acted in that way, another analysis of the meaning of tolerance in Dutch society puts forward this option: "While modern readers think of tolerance in terms of equality, early modern Europeans had a completely different conception. For them, tolerance was at best a begrudging acceptance or, more accurately, a refusal to use state power to force people to worship in a certain way." As the author goes on to say, "Tolerance, it was said, was 'long a loser’s creed.' Even during the Enlightenment, when reason was supposed to curb the excesses of the religious fanaticism that plagued the Reformation era, tolerance was uneven and sporadic. Only a few religious groups, such as the Anabaptists, truly advocated religious tolerance as central to their creeds. Most groups only tolerated ideas that did not stray too far from the standard religious tenets.")

Regardless of the fluctuation of tolerance from one setting to another, modern social analysis recognises that cross-culturalisation is a dominant outcome of situations similar to this in the Netherlands, and that such social change is an observable and measurable consequence. (Note: For a broad understanding of the phenomenon of cultural change, see Inglehart, Ronald, and Christian Welzel. Modernization, Cultural Change, and Democracy: The Human Development Sequence. Cambridge University Press, 2005. ISBN 978-0-521-84695-0.)

As stated above (See 1.3.1 Operation in Politics), the evolution of social, cultural, political and religious ideas we label under the term "Enlightenment" were a major influence on Van der Palm. Enlightenment concepts had begun to emerge in the Netherlands by the middle of the 17th century carrying among them considerations about the primacy of reason, the rights and roles of the individual, constitutional government, the separation of church and state, and, more specifically, the replacement of a world-view based on theological belief structures with one derived from philosophical discourse.

This is the climate in which Van der Palm's scholarship and theology were formed.

Utrecht researcher Van Eijnatten's assessment of the period drew this conclusion about Van der Palm among his contemporaries:

"Van der Palm was representative of a new generation of theologians who had appointed themselves moral leaders of the Dutch nation. They integrated the anti-deist ethic of politeness into the politico-religious ideology that had underwritten the Dutch state since the French-inspired Batavian Revolution of 1795. The idea that moderation, together with diligence, thrift, and neatness, amount to a way of achieving domestic happiness was hardly novel; but domesticity as such (and the traits implied by it) were first turned into national attributes in the early decades of the nineteenth century."

The context of Van Eijnatten's essay began with this opening statement:

"Charity and peace for all mankind are usually ranged among the characteristic aspects of the message put forward in the sacred texts on which the Christian religion is based. Yet the official interpreters of these texts (theologians and ecclesiastical office holders) in Western countries of the early modern period are often associated with exactly the opposite: with hostility, antagonism, belligerence— in short, with what was at the time called odium theologicum or theological hatred."

As shown below, this tension between benign, discursive philosophico-religio-ethical consideration and dogmatic, aggressive credalism was active in Van der Palm's lifetime, as well as before and after.

As a prerequisite of his ordination to ministry in the Reformed Church, Van der Palm would have ascribed to the church's doctrines as set out in the Drie formulieren van Enigheid (Three Forms of Unity). (Note: That is to say the Canons of Dort from 1618, the Belgic Confession as revised by the 1618–19 Synod of Dort and written into the Canons of Dort, and the Heidelberg Catechism from 1563) For this reason it can be assumed that Van der Palm would have seen himself as belonging to a theological approach directly descended from Calvin.

On the other hand, though, he has been referred to as a religious moderate to whom the expression of dogmatic theological views was not an option. (Note: Indeed, Van der Palm's classification as a moderate, and his position in terms of Calvinist doctrine, are well-illustrated in Schutte, J. A. Groen van Prinsterer: His Life and Work. Translated by Harry van Dyke. Based on the 1977 edition with further revisions by the author. Publishers' Imprint, 2005. p. 8. At this time, 1824, van Prinsterer, aged 23, was a student at Leiden University where one of his teachers was Van der Palm, and the two of them had become friends. Van der Palm's colleague on staff, Joan Melchior Kemper had died and there was discussion about van Prinsterer replacing him. As Schutte reports, "Kemper, Borger "Elias Annes Borger", Van der Palm – the names indicate the climate of opinion that reigned in Leyden during Groen's university days: self-consciously Netherlandic, urbane, and Protestant in the sense of a watered-down Calvinism, above all liberal and moderate. reasonably confident in progress and perfectibility." While "watered-down" might be seen as meaning "uncommitted" or "without purpose", the picture that has already emerged of Van der Palm indicates that he was quite the opposite. His mind was set on other objectives.) It is not surprising then that extensive searching so far through his sermons, correspondence and other literature has found no direct quotes of Calvin or other reformists and only one general reference to Luther, Calvin, Zwingli and Melanchthon as a group.

This occurs in Salomo where Van der Palm analyses Proverbs 22:12, "The eyes of the Lord preserve knowledge, and he overthrows the words of the transgressor." (De oogen des Heeren bewaren de wetenschap; maar de zaken des trouweloozen zal Hij omkeeren.). At the outset of his text, Van der Palm discusses the meaning of wetenschap (that is 'science' in its specific meaning as 'knowledge') in relation to the Hebrew word from which it was translated. And having argues that the Hebrew usage of 'knowledge' was synonymous with 'truth', his conclusion was "Wetenschap is hetzelfde als kennis, en wel zuivere, gezonde kennis, kennis der waarheid." (That is to say, "Science is the same as knowledge, and pure, sound knowledge, knowledge of the truth.")

On these grounds, he goes on later to say, "If there is a chance for the matter of truth to be so haphazard among men, fortunately there is a defender in heaven, whose eyes watch it, and who makes the glib words of the faithless slippery to their own fall." He then draws a parallel between, on one hand, God's call to Abraham and the relationship with the nation of Israel followed by their betrayal of that commitment, and the work undertaken by the reformists on the other, saying "so that a Luther, Calvin, Zwingli and Melanchthon and others could arise, old understandings (or "knowledge", that is knowledge of the "truth") would have to be revived from the dead." (Note: In a survey of Calvin's attitudes towards religious liberty, personal conscience and the law, US legal analyst Witte provides two contrasting images of Calvin. In the first, Calvin in his twenties and at the beginning of his reformation work is described as demonstrating "a bold and brilliant young mind at work." By the time Calvin is in his early- to mid-forties, the picture changes. Or as Witte says, faced with alternative ideas from others or opposition to his views, "Calvin found little convincing in such criticisms, and in his later years – as his critics multiplied and insurrection in Geneva mounted – he defended his views with ever more bitter vitriol. A reading of Witte's study reveals that, overall, his overall assessment of Calvin is favourable, even though it reveals to way in which Calvin became more and more dogmatic in his views, especially when challenged by others. But that is not relevant to this survey of Van der Palm. Indeed, how much Van der Palm knew about the details of Calvin's life is not revealed. There can be no doubt that Van der Palm would have studied Calvin's theology in depth, and to his moderate mind its dogmatic tone and content would not have attracted him.)

The attitudes of Van der Palm and other Dutch moderates to Calvin's theology emerge in an independent 1821 report published in the United States:

"A sermon has been published, pronounced by a Professor of Theology at Leyden, in which the doctrine of predestination is described as a frightful doctrine, – dishonourable to God, – and absurd, – representing the Deity as practising a deception upon his creatures, inviting and calling them to repentance and salvation, after having predetermined the everlasting misery of the greatest part of them. The Reviewers, astonished at this open attack on a doctrine preached formerly by themselves, pronounce the terms here used to be too harsh, and insulting to a doctrine which, during two centuries, has made an interesting part of the popular belief. They agree, however, that the word election is to be understood, as used concerning that which is chosen or preferred on account of some better quality and disposition, as Paul is named a chosen vessel, &c. They propose to explain the word in this sense, without mentioning or reproaching the former doctrine, and trust, that in so doing, the former erroneous explication will be forgotten, and the truth insensibly prevail. Here we see in the Church of Holland another proof of the inexpediency and injurious tendency of human forms of belief, forced under the name of creeds on Christian ministers. It is certainly not by a suddenly received light, that the clergy in Holland have discovered, that, as far as regards the doctrine of predestination at least, the creed till of late unconditionally subscribed by them, and forced upon others, is not in accordance with the Bible. The growing disbelief in the doctrine has at length encouraged, perhaps forced them, to make this confession; they dare not, however, now do this from the pulpit, where they, as their brethren the Calvinists in this country, were formerly always insisting upon it."

Shortly thereafter Van der Palm's name appears in the report:

"Professor Vander [sic.] Palm, the celebrated Dutch biblical critic, and a most eloquent preacher, has published six volumes of sermons, which I have received. On the subject of the atonement he is positive; he does not, however, explain it as an infinite satisfaction to enable the Deity to be merciful towards his creatures, but for some reasons inexplicable to us, as a means by God ordained, and necessary to our salvation. He appears to me to have adopted, what Dr. Price calls the middle scheme, and which the latter thinks the nearest the truth in the gospel account. Professor Vander Palm speaks of Christ always in the language of the Bible, and as the image of God’s glory revealed on earth; that in him we see the Father; that his wisdom, power and love, are those of the Father, and that thus exalted, perfected and glorified by the Father, we must love and obey Christ as we do the Father. He represents Christ's present exaltation, "not because he was from eternity with the Father, but because he has been made perfect by obedience and suffering, and has obtained the delivery of men by his blood." (Note: Good illustrations of this biblical interpretation can be found laid out in his sermons on the texts Matthew 13:44–46 and 1 Corinthians 1:30.) Of the Holy Spirit he always speaks as of the power of God. All the Reviewers speak of these sermons with unqualified praise, and recommend them as models. It seems to me obvious, therefore, that the doctrine of the Trinity is abandoned by the greater part, and the most learned of the Dutch clergy, not less than the doctrine of Predestination."

The attitudes of orthodox Calvinists towards those holding moderate or reformist views in politics or religion were mutual because those Calvinists who, believing they were following a valid interpretation of faith, saw themselves as being threatened by anyone expressing alternative views. But as the 1821 report tells us:

"It is not long ago, however, that the slightest departure from the Creed established in 1618, was followed by a formal dismissal of a minister from any of the Established Churches. The Synods and classes were particularly watchful “for the preservation of the only true doctrines and the purity of the faith, as settled and declared by the Fathers of the Council (Note: Or "Synod" as it is usually called.) of Dort.” But we may suppose the national general Synod of 1817 to have represented the opinions of the great majority of the Dutch theologians, at least of the most learned and esteemed among them, and of the heads of the Universities. The perfect freedom allowed by this Synod to the ministers of religion, to take the Bible as their standard of faith and doctrine, amounts to a virtual abandonment of any system of orthodoxy.

Van der Palm's theology included a disinterest in credal expressions and doctrinal formulae. As teacher and preacher he preferred to focus on expounding the biblical story as a basis for and approach to life and faith. This is well-stated in his explanation of German Lutheran theologian Theodor Fliedner:

"German theologians who believe that God revealed himself usually place too much stress on the single dogmas of the Trinity, or Sin, or Regeneration. We Dutchmen do not deny them but in our sermons we place them more in the background, partly because they are incomprehensible and partly because the consequences and developments of these early dogmas in later time have become totally unbiblical. In contrast, we stress the forgiveness of sin, of reconciliation, of the duty to give Christ the glory; and those doctrines we teach most frequently."

In practical terms, therefore, Van der Palm set out this principle in a sermon where he is quoted as saying, "As the apostle John left the secret of Christ's nature unresolved for his pupils, so will I not try for you to lift this veil of mystery." Van der Palm and others of a similar mind were both widely supported, but also criticised by those who begged for a return to the orthodoxy of a former era.

From his preaching and writings it is clear that Van der Palm held the conventional supernaturalist view that the created world in all its observed forms including its ethical structure was created by and subject to the will and power of a deity, in his case, the God as revealed in the Bible especially through Jesus. (Note: The integration of such a view as held in Van der Palm's time is demonstrated in a specific analysis of history by an author who recorded the French invasion in the following way: "The President (that is Pieter Paulus, a former Patriot who was elected as first president of the Batavian Republic's new Provisional Representatives of the People of Holland) in his first speech, complimented the members of the assembly as lawful representatives of the people; he called their attention to the Divine Providence, which, in so particular a manner, had favoured the success of the friends and deliverers of the country by the severe frost, which had covered the rivers and waters with ice. He acknowledged the sovereignty of the people, and the sacred rights of man." A similar attitude lay behind the sentiments expressed about Prince William V's return to the Stadtholderate in 1795: "There is no God who can deliver such as the "God of the Netherlands".") (Note: Other evidence points towards a decline in supernaturalist views in the Netherlands at this time.) This view is reflected in Beets' biography of Van der Palm where he makes frequent reference to Voorzienigheid (Providence - a synonym for God or God's power): for example, addressing the question of how it was that he came to be writing the book at all, he asks, "Why did it not please Providence to permit the noble Van der Palm to leave one of his four sons behind him, who, resembling him in disposition, formed by him from childhood, might have been able to perform it more worthily, and entirely in his spirit ? Such was not the Divine will."

When in 1801, in his government position of Minister for National Education, Van der Palm was asked to review the relationship between church and state, his initial recommendation was that the connection between the state and the Reformed Church should be formalised. This idea was not set in place, and Van der Palm's response was to propose that all churches, including the Catholic Church, should be nationalised, especially in their role as suppliers of education. This was built on his view that the teaching of religion in schools should be directed towards the moral development of children but free of denominational or doctrinal content. (Note: Another Dutch moderate contemporary, possibly his assistant van der Ende, is quoted as saying that "the primary schools should be Christian, but neither Protestant nor Catholic. They should not lean to any particular form of worship nor teach any positive dogmas; but should be of that kind that Jews might attend without inconvenience to their faith.") This stirred wide opposition from those churches who wanted to use their own schools as environments in which they could propound their own theological interpretations, along with parents, especially more conservative Calvinists, who expected all schools, including those run by the state, to play a role in doctrine-based religious education.

Although Biblical criticism is generally thought to have emerged as a discipline by the end of the 19th century, it clearly has its beginnings in the 17th century, (Note: The first such example was Richard Simon's 1678 Histoire critique du Vieux Testament which was followed in 1689 by Histoire critique du texte du Nouveau Testament: où l'on établit la verité des actes sur lesquels la religion chrêtienne est fondée.) and Van der Palm along with other contemporaries advanced this further. Their primary interest was the study of those languages, especially Biblical Hebrew, Aramaic, Koinē or Biblical Greek and Arabic, in which the Old and New Testament documents were either originally written or circulated. By doing so, they understood this would greatly assist them to better understand the original meaning of the texts and lead to more accurate translations into modern languages. Van der Palm had a particular interest in Arabic because he held the view that some ancient fragments of the Old Testament that had been discovered at that time would help to explain anomalies in the Hebrew text. Furthermore, because of knowledge of poetic structure, he was better able to identify and comprehend poetic expression which occurs frequently in the Old Testament and less often in the New.

Comparing their translations from the original languages with other translations made from different source documents, Van der Palm and others placed little merit on the Vulgate or Latin translation most of which was made from secondary sources not in the original languages. Similarly, flaws and inaccuracies were evident in the Septuagint or LXX as it is often called (the reference in both names being to falsely-claimed legend that this translation had been carried out by 70 scholars), a translation from Hebrew into Koinē Greek of the Old Testament and other non-biblical documents. (Note: Evidence shows that this translation was commenced in the 3rd Century B.C.E. and was in wide circulation because quotes from it appear in the New Testament, most frequently in the Pauline epistles.)

Regarding Van der Palm's attitude towards Roman Catholicism, as was common among members of Protestant denominations at that time, he would have had little or no exposure to its theology or worship. From his own moderate approach to dogma, he would have found Catholicism unnecessarily strict, authoritarian and hidebound; and the fact that worship was conducted in a language (Latin) not spoken or understood by a majority of participants, the laity's lack of access to the Bible in their own language and with the ignorance that arose from that, together with what was seen as a reliance on "superstitious" elements such as the veneration of saints or the use of the Rosary would have seemed irrational and illogical. (Note: As a commentator has put it, "an important consideration was that its organizational form permitted foreign, papal influences and the Dutch government took no opportunity to exert influence on the clergy. The Catholic Church and its priests were in fact typified as non-Dutch. They were also measured according to the Protestant norm of being useful, civilized and enlightened citizens. The fact that they were found to be too insignificant formed the prevailing view within the Dutch (Protestant) society that led to a deterioration of the social position of Catholics.") Nevertheless, even though, in his view, the Catholic Church seemed to have been "left behind by the Enlightenment", Van der Palm accepted Catholics as being a significant part of the Batavian population and did not propose or support their isolation from society or the affairs of government, especially education.

Indeed, of all the religious subcultures functioning within Dutch society in Van der Palm's lifetime, it was the Catholic and Reformed Churches (and for a short time the Jews) which appear to have gained the most. Although never formally expressed in constitutional form, the more democratic and reformative climate of the Batavian Republic after 1798 meant that religious bodies were of equal status, citizens were therefore free to worship and practice according to their own personal choice, belonging to any particular religious body gave no advantage to individuals, and the internal and external operations of all religious organisations were subject to civil law. Then from 1800, despite there being no state church, the government asserted more control over the churches by administering membership, paying the clergy, financing church building and many church social bodies, promoting new theologies, and suppressing ultra-orthodoxy and aggressive evangelism. Between 1800 and 1870 there were two state departments, one for the administration of the Reformed Church and the other for the Catholic Church.

In 1816 the new monarch, King William I reconstituted the Reformed Church under the name Nederlandsche (or Nederlandse, according to the new spelling) Hervormde Kerk, with a new constitution which gave civil authorities control over the appointment of new clergy, the choice of those who attended synods, and what preachers could say from the pulpit.

A graphic breakdown of religious views at this time shows minorities of 'ultra-liberal' and 'ultra-orthodox representation at each end of a pole, next larger representations of those called "liberal" and "strict", and on either side of the balance point an equal majority of those who are either "moderate" or "conservative." According to this model, Van der Palm, the epitome of moderatism, should have found himself in the most comfortable of all possibilities. As Van Eijnatten has said, "Van der Palm was representative of a new generation of theologians who had appointed themselves moral leaders of the Dutch nation. They integrated the anti-deist ethic of politeness into the politico-religious ideology that had underwritten the Dutch state since the French-inspired Batavian Revolution of 1795."

But more than a passive participant or even a grand public moraliser, Van der Palm emerged in the eyes of others clearly as one who lived out his everyday existence by exactly the same standards he would have aspired for the society around him:

"The chief trait of his character was love. If any one, he understood, he practised in all relations this Christian virtue in its whole extent. It was not only his constant endeavor to promote the happiness of others, of many, to secure it, to augment it in various ways, and to see that justice was done them; but he especially exercised himself, with considerate scrupulousness, to impair, to becloud no one's happiness, no one's pleasure, by word or look or silence, – a matter often far more difficult, and accompanied with greater self-denial, than the conferring of a benefit or the rendering of a service. Charitable in his views of others, and mild in his utterances respecting them, nothing was so odious to him as suspicion, evil speaking, rash judging.

== Bible translator ==
The individual books of the Bible originally arrived in written form in ancient languages, Biblical Hebrew and Aramaic in the case of the Old Testament, and for the New Testament Koinē Greek. By modern times, it has been translated into almost every language in the world.

In most cases, translations have been made from texts other than those in which they originally appeared. Only a minority have been undertaken using ancient sources in the original languages as sources. (Note: Luther's translation into German was another which was carried out in this way, although having been undertaken about three centuries earlier than Van der Palm's, his access to original texts would have been very limited.) Along with working from these source texts, modern biblical translators have followed the insight of related disciplines like philology, etymology and linguistics by accepting that languages change and evolve, and that the meaning of ancient texts can only be established when one document is read in the context of other texts from the same period.

Van der Palm's translation is one of only a few, and certainly one of the earliest, that worked within all these criteria, thereby making it a highly scholarly document. Being the first Dutch translation carried out directly from the documents in their original languages, it was viewed by many as having special merit. In addition, he wanted the text to be readable and understandable to his contemporaries. To this end, in some parts of the text he would step away from literal translation and use a more descriptive approach. (Note: See Translation studies for an examination of this process.)

His hope was that this new translation would replace the Statenvertaling (Translation by the States) or Statenbijbel (States Bible) which was published first in 1637. He did not share the same trust in this translation, preferring instead the work of some 16th century translators, although he did not view their work as infallible, largely because their translations in Dutch were based on earlier translations in other languages rather than the originals.

For his translation of the Old Testament Van der Palm drew frequently upon the Masoretic Text - although he knew that other Hebrew texts were more reliable - and sometimes made use of the Samaritan Pentateuch (which varied in several thousand ways with the Masoretic Text ). For the New Testament he used the Received Text (Textus Receptus) and seldom departed from it. He made extensive use of footnotes to explain his translational decisions, and wrote introductions to each of the Bible books. He was also highly influenced by the King James Version because of the scholarship behind it, and the layout format employed in its printed editions (for example, he copied its layout of the Lord's Prayer).

He began planning this in 1816–17 leading to the distribution of a prospectus in which he described the project and asked for financial support. (Note: The full text can be found in Beets 1865, pp. 144–148.) A quick response included the names of over two thousand people including nobility, fellow scholars and church colleagues. The first portion of the translation appeared in 1818 when he sent to that year's synod a copy with a covering letter in which he set out his objectives. Further results were sent to the synods in 1819, 1829, 1822 and 1823, and the work was completed in 1828 and 1829 after he had translated the Apocryphal books of the Old Testament. So the original estimate of three years' work had expanded out to many more. He is quoted as saying, "I have worked at it forty years, and eight of them like a horse." And despite all he had done earlier on the books of Isaiah, Proverbs and Psalms, his research from the 1810s onwards revealed those documents as needing even more attention. Not surprising that he would say in his correspondence with the 1829 synod, "After all the years of labor bestowed on the books of Solomon, I still find so much matter for new investigation that I am obliged to proceed much more slowly than I had anticipated, as I endeavor studiously to avoid all precipitation, though sometimes tempted to it."

In its completed version, the translation was published in three-volumes between 1825 and 1830. It was popular among the higher educated and middle classes, and it became commonly known as the Palmbijbel, although Van der Palm considered it to be only a revision of the Statenvertaling. The Dutch Reformed Church formally adhered to use of the Statenvertaling until 1951, although it carried out updates of this text several times after the publication of the Palmbijbel.

== Poet and author ==
Van der Palm was a productive, award-winning poet, who used skills that were obvious from early in his life. His father, Cornelis van der Palm, was co-founder of the Rotterdam literary society Studium scientiarum genetrix (Note: Which means literally "Mother of scientific study", although "scientific" is not a reference to the discipline of science but takes its derivation from the Latin root scire, 'to know'. In other words, scientiarum is a reference to "knowledge" or the "use of knowledge" in any field, in the case of this society, the relationship between knowledge of literary forms and the writing of poetry and prose. However, the society's name should be precisely understood as meaning "The Study of the Creative Principle of Knowledge.") which began in 1773. (Note: In 1800 this society amalgamated with similar societies in Leiden and Amsterdam to become the Bataafsche Maatschappij van Taal- en Dichtkunde (Batavian Society for Language and Literature) of which Professor Matthijs Siegenbeek was also an active member.) Van der Palm joined when he was 17 and was appointed as a member of merit six years later. In 1782 the society awarded a gold medal for his poem Het Oorlog (The War). (Note: The poem was published in 1782 showing under his name the text "aen wien de gouden eerpenning is toegewezen" ("to whom the gold medal has been awarded").) By that time he was studying at Leiden University and wrote many other notable poems. For example, De verheerlijking van Christus op den berg (The Transfiguration of Christ on the Mountain) appeared in 1784, and attracted a gold medal from The Hague's poetry society Kunstliefde of which Van der Palm was a member.

After that time, Van der Palm concentrated his work on prose writing, becoming, as Van Eijnatten has described him, "the most prolific writer of this generation of Dutch theologians, accounting for 141 (132 + 9) published, self-authored writings" in the period 1760-1840.

His prose covered many areas, with biblical criticism and analysis the most frequent subjects. Eenige Liederen van David, vertaald en opgehelderd, door JH van der Palm (Some Songs of David) was the first major publication. It appeared in 1791 and has already been discussed (See above - 1.2.2 Movement Away from Ministry). Next came a work entitled Jesaias vertaald en opgehelderd (Isaiah translated and explained) begun in 1805 and published the following year.

One of his longest projects apart from the translation of the Bible was the weekly series of essays published under the title Salomo (Solomon) which focussed on the language, meaning and moral teachings of the Old Testament book of Proverbs. Van der Palm began writing these in 1808 producing 319 before he moved onto other projects eight years later. As the output progressed, they were gathered together and published in volumes, with the first complete edition being 9 volumes.

Besides his translation of the Bible with commentary notes (See above), he also wrote the Bijbel voor de Jeugd (Note: Other authors have also written books under the same title.) (Youth Bible), not so much a Bible as a retelling of Bible stories, the first-ever such texts designed specifically for children. In them, Van der Palm set out to tell the stories in ways that would make sense to readers of that age. Portions were frequently included in newspapers, and these were frequently recommended to children by their parents. Writing of these began in 1811 and continued until 1834. Originally published and circulated in 24 parts, the earlier essays were drawn into three volumes and published in 1827.

Possibly his most highly regarded work was Gescheid- en redekunstig gedenkschrift van Nederlands Herstelling in den jare 1813 (Historical and rhetorical account of the emancipation of the Netherlands, in the year 1813). This was written in response to a prize of 700 guilders offered in May 1815 by Jan van Kinsbergen, a celebrated naval officer (by this time retired), author and philanthropist, for the writing of a history and memoir analysing the country's restoration as the United Netherlands under the princedom of William I, soon to be king. Van der Palm won the award. (Note: For a summary of the book see North American Review 1818, p. 172. The unnamed author of this essay described Van der Palm as "reputed to be the most elegant writer, that has yet appeared in the Dutch language.")

A comprehensive listing of his writings and published speeches can be found in the Appendix to Beets' biography.

== Sources ==
- Abels, Paul H. A. M.; De Groot, Aart (2014). "The Eighteenth Century". In Selderhuis, Herman J. (ed.). Handbook of Dutch Church History. Vandenhoeck & Ruprecht. ISBN 978-3-525-55787-7.
- Anonymous (1818). Sparks, Jared; Everett, Edward; Lowell, James Russell; Lodge, Henry Cabot (eds.). "Art. VI. Gescheid en redekunstig gedenkschrift van Nederlands Herstelling in den jare 1813, door J.H. van der Palm. Amsterdam, 1816" [Historical and rhetorical account of the emancipation of the Netherlands, in the year 1813, by J. H. van der Palm]. The North American Review and Miscellaneous Journal (in Dutch). 6. Cummings and Hilliard.
- Beets, Nicolaas (1865). Life and Character of J. H. van der Palm, D.D., Professor of Oriental Languages and Antiquities; Also of Sacred Literature and Poetry at the University of Leyden. Leven en karakter van Johannes Henricus van der Palm.English. Translated by Westervelt, J. P. Hurd and Houghton.
- Bijleveld, Nikolaj Hein (2007). Voor God, Volken en Vaderland: De plaats van de hervormde predikant binnen de nationale eenwordingsprocessen in Nederland in de eerste helft van de negentiende eeuw [For God, People and Fatherland: The place of the reformed preacher in the national unification processes in the Netherlands in the first half of the nineteenth century] (in Dutch). Eburon. ISBN 978-90-5972-209-5.
- Dekker, Jeroen J. H. (2011). "From Imaginations to Realities: The Transformation of Enlightenment Pedagogical Illusions of the Dutch Republic into Late 19th-Century Realities of the Dutch Monarchy.". In Tröhler, Daniel; Popkewitz, Thomas; Labaree, David F. (eds.). Schooling and the Making of Citizens in the Long Nineteenth Century: Comparative Visions. Routledge. ISBN 978-0-415-88900-1.
- Glenn, Charles Leslie Jr. (1987). The myth of the common school (Dissertation). Boston University.
- TenZythoff, Gerrit J. (1987). Sources of Secession: The Netherlands Hervormde Kerk on the Eve of the Dutch Immigration to the Midwest. Wm. Eerdmans Publishing Co. ISBN 978-0-8028-0328-3.
- Van der Palm, Johannes (1816). Salomo. 9 volumes. GTN Suringar.
- Van Eijnatten, Joris (2002). "From Modesty to Mediocrity: Regulating Public Dispute, 1670-1840: The Case of Dutch Divines" (PDF). Common Knowledge. 8 (2). Duke University Press.
- Witte, John Jr. (1996). Moderate Religious Liberty: John Calvin and the Geneva experiment. Public Law & Legal Theory Research Paper Series, Research Paper No. 04-2. Emory University School of Law.

== Bibliography ==
=== By Van der Palm (selective) ===
- Bijbel bevattende alle de boeken des ouden en nieuwen verbonds (Bible containing all the books of the Old and New Testaments). D. du Mortier & Zoon, 1825–1830.
- Bijbel voor de Jeugd (Youth Bible), Volumes 1-3. D. du Mortier en Zoon, 1827.
- Ecclesiastes philologic et cricice illustratus (Ecclesiastes philologically and critically illustrated). S. en. J. Luchtmans, 1784.
- Eenige Liederen van David, vertaald en opgehelderd, door' JH van der Palm (Some Songs of David). W. A. Keel / de Leeuw en Krap, 1791.
- Gescheid- en redekunstig gedenkschrift van Nederlands Herstelling in den jare 1813 (Historical and rhetorical account of the emancipation of the Netherlands, in the year 1813). J. van der Hey en Zoon, 1816.
- Jesaias vertaald en opgehelderd (Isaiah translated and explained). Blussé en van Braam, 1806.
- Het Oorlog (The War). 1782.
- Oratio de Imperatore Ali, Abu-Talebi filio, Saracenorum principum maximo. (Address on Caliph Alī, son of Abī Ṭālib, great Saracene official.) Dissertation, Leiden University, 8 February 1819. S. en. J. Luchtmans, 1819.
- Salomo (Solomon), 9 Volumes. GTN Suringar, 1816.

=== About Van der Palm (selective) ===
- Aa, A. J. van der and others. "Palm (Johannes Henricus van der)". Biographisch Woordenboek der Nederlanden (Biographical Dictionary of the Netherlands). Volume 15. J. J. van Brederode, 1872. pp. 58–68.
- Beets, Nicolaas. "Life and Character of J. H. van der Palm, D.D., Professor of Oriental Languages and Antiquities; Also of Sacred Literature and Poetry at the University of Leyden." Translated by J. P. Westervelt, Hurd and Houghton, 1865.
- Fockens, H. F. T. J. H. van der Palm, als bijbel-uitlegger, redenaar en schrijver gekenschetst (J. H. van der Palm, portrayed as Bible translator, orator and writer). D. du Mortier en Zoon, 1841.
- Glasius, B. "Johannes Henricus van der Palm". Biographisch Woordenboek van Nederlandsche Godgeleerden (Biographical Dictionary of Dutch Theologians), Volume 3. Gebr. Muller, 1856. pp. 58–70.
- Groffie, J. J. M. "Een Feestrede van J. H. van der Palm" (An Official Address on J. H. van der Palm). Jaarboekje voor geschiedenis en oudheidkunde van Leiden en Omstreken 1967. Dissertation, pp. 123–132.
- Groot, Aart de. Leven en Arbeid van J.H. van der Palm (Life and Labor of J.H. van der Palm). H. Veenman en Zonen N.V., 1960.
- Hallema, A. "Johannes Henricus van der Palm. 1763. His instructions for the introduction of medical supervision by the state, then called "state medical regulation"." Ziekenhuiswezen. April 1963, 36. pp. 126-8.
- Hengel, Wessel Albertus van. Meritorum Ioannis Henrici van der Palm commemoratio brevis : lecta in classe tertia instituti Regii Neerlandici. S. en J. Luchtmans, 1840.
- Knappert, L., P. C. Molhuysen and P. J. Blok. "Palm. Johannes Henricus van der". Nieuw Nederlandsch Biografisch Woordenboek (New Dutch Biographical Dictionary), Volume 5. A. W. Sijthoff's Uitgevers-Maatschappij, 1921. pp. 430–433.
- Van Eijnatten, Joris. "De generatie - Van der Palm. Nederlandse academische theologen en de productie van religieuze kennis, 1760-1840" (The generation - Van der Palm. Dutch academic theologians and the production of religious knowledge, 1760-1840). Nederlandsch theologisch tijdschrift, Volume 59. Vrije Universiteit Amsterdam, 2005. pp. 215–234.

=== Other ===
- Baggerman, Arianne and Rudolf M. Dekker. Child of the Enlightenment: Revolutionary Europe Reflected in a Boyhood Diary. Brill, 2009. ISBN 978-90-04-17269-2.
- Becker, Uwe. Dutch Tolerance: Something to learn from? E-International Relations, 2011. "Dutch Tolerance". Accessed 8 March 2018.
- Boekholt P. Th. F. M., and Engelina Petronella de Booy. Geschiedenis van de school in Nederland vanaf de middeleeuwen tot aan de huidige tijd (History of the school in the Netherlands from the Middle Ages to the present time). Van Gorcum, 1987. ISBN 978-90-232-2260-6.
- Eglinton, James. Trinity and Organism: Towards a New Reading of Herman Bavinck's Organic Motif. T&T Clark International, 2016. ISBN 978-0-567-12478-4
- ––– "From Modesty to Mediocrity: Regulating Public Dispute, 1670-1840: The Case of Dutch Divines". Common Knowledge, Volume 8, Issue 2. Duke University Press, 2002. pp. 310–332. "From Modesty to Mediocrity" Accessed 3 March 2018.
- ––– "Orthodoxie, ketterij en consensus, 1670-1850. Drie historische vertogen over religie en openbaarheid" (Orthodoxy, heresy and consensus, 1670-1850. Three historical discourses on religion and publicity). BMGN: Low Countries Historical Review, Volume 119, Issue 4. BMGN, 2004. pp. 468–490."Orthodoxy, heresy and consensus" Accessed 6 March 2018.
- Glenn, Charles Leslie Jr. The myth of the common school. Dissertation, Boston University, 1987. pp. 87–141, 235-242, 513-524."The myth of the common school" ISBN 978-0-87023-603-7.
- Kagchelland, Arend, and Michiel Kagchelland Van dompers en verlichten: een onderzoek naar de confrontatie tussen het vroege protestantse Réveil en de Verlichting in Nederland (1825-1826) (Dumbbells and illuminants: an investigation into the confrontation between the early Protestant Revival and the Enlightenment in the Netherlands (1825-1826)). Doctoral thesis, Leiden University. Eburon, 2009. ISBN 978-90-5972-276-7.
- Selderhuis, Herman, Editor. Handbook of Dutch Church History. Vandenhoeck and Ruprecht, 2014. ISBN 978-3-525-55787-7.
- Sengers, Erik. "European Exceptionalism: Lazy Churches, Pluralism, Adherence, and the Case of the Dutch Religious Cartel." Church and Religion in Contemporary Europe: Results from Empirical and Comparative Research. Edited by Gert Pickel and Olaf Müller. Springer-Verlag, 2009. pp. 167–182. ISBN 978-3-531-91989-8
- Sepp, Christiaan. Proeve eener pragmatische geschiedenis der theologie in Nederland: sedert het laatst der vorige eeuw tot op onzen tijd (1787-1858). (Proof of a pragmatic history of theology in the Netherlands: since the last of the last century up to our time (1787-1858)). J. C. Sepp en Zoon, 1860. "Proeve eener pragmatische geschiedenis der theologie in Nederland". Accessed 17 March 2018.
- Spaans, Joke W. "Religious Policies in the Seventeenth-Century Dutch Republic." Calvinism and Religious Toleration in the Dutch Golden Age. Edited by Ronnie Po-chia Hsia and Henk van Nierop. Cambridge University Press, 2002. pp. 72–86. "Religious Policies". Accessed 22 March 2018.
- ––– "Unity and Diversity as a Theme in Early Modern Dutch Religious History: An Interpretation". Studies in Church History, Volume 32. Edited by R. N. Swanson. Cambridge University Press, 1996. pp. 221– 234. "Unity and Diversity". Accessed 4 March 2018.
- "State of Religion in Holland. (From the Christian Disciple, Boston, March, 1821.)" The Monthly Repository of Theology and General Literature. January to December 1821 inclusive, Vol. 16. Sherwood, Neely and Jones, 1821. pp. 418–420.
- TenZythoff, Gerrit J. Sources of Secession: The Netherlands Hervormde Kerk on the Eve of the Dutch Immigration to the Midwest. Wm. B. Eerdmans Publishing, 1987'. "Sources of Secession" ISBN 978-0-8028-0328-3.
- Schooling and the Making of Citizens in the Long Nineteenth Century: Comparative Visions. Edited by Daniel Tröhler, Thomas S. Popkewitz and David F. Labaree. Routledge, 2011. ISBN 978-0-415-88900-1.
- Van Bunge, Wiep, Editor. The Early Enlightenment in the Dutch Republic, 1650-1750. Selected Papers of a Conference held at the Herzog August Bibliothek, Wolfenbüttel, 22–23 March 2001. Brill, 2003. ISBN 978-90-04-13587-1
- Van Cleave, Peter. Revolt, Religion, and Dissent in the Dutch-American Atlantic: Francis Adrian van der Kemp's Pursuit of Civil and Religious Liberty. Doctoral Dissertation, Arizona State University, 2014. Especially Chapters 2 & 3, pp. 23–101. "Revolt, Religion, and Dissent". Accessed 22 March 2018.
- Van der Blom, Dirk. De verhouding van staat en religie in een veranderende Nederlandse samenleving (The relationship between state and religion in a changing Dutch society). Doctoral dissertation, Leiden University, 2016. "Relationship between state and religion". Accessed 19 March 2018.
- Van Ditzhuyzen, Reina. Onderwijs als opdracht. Leven en werk van de eerste vijftien ministers belast met het onderwijs in de periode 1798-1830 (Education as assignment: Life and work of the first fifteen ministers responsible for education in the period 1798-1830). Staatsuitgeverij, 1977. ISBN 978-90-12-01833-3.
- Van Eijnatten, Joris. Vijf vertogen over ketterij. Waarheid, dwaling en de historiografie van het antitrinitarisme, 1650-1800 (Five discourses about heresy. Truth, error and the historiography of anti-Trinitarianism, 1650-1800). Volume 30. Mennonite Contributions, 2004. pp. 153–164.
- Van Loon, Hendrik Willem. The Rise of the Dutch Kingdom 1795-1813: A Short Account of the Early Development of the Modern Kingdom of the Netherlands. Nabu Press, 2010. ISBN 1-176-43646-5
- Van Sas, N. C. F. De metamorfose van Nederland: Van oude orde naar moderniteit, 1750–1900 (The metamorphosis of the Netherlands. From old order to modernity, 1750-1900). Amsterdam University Press, 2004. pp. 347–358. ISBN 978-90-5356-675-6.
- Witte, John Jr. "Moderate Religious Liberty: John Calvin and the Geneva experiment." Public Law & Legal Theory Research Paper Series, Research Paper No. 04-2. Emory University School of Law, 1996. "Moderate Religious Liberty". Accessed 9 March 2018.

== Useful links ==
- Biografisch poortal van Nederland "Johannes Henricus van der Palm"
- Digitale Bibliotheek voor de Nederlandse Letteren "J.H. van der Palm"
- KNAW Historisch Ledenbestand "Johannes Henricus van der Palm (1763 - 1840)"
- Leidse hoogleraren vanaf 1575 (Leiden Professors from 1575) "Johan Hendrik van der Palm"
- Parlementair Documentatie Centrum Universiteit Leiden "Dr. JH van der Palm"
- Repertory of office bearers and civil servants 1428-1861 "Johannes Henricus van der Palm"
