= K. W. Swart =

Dutch-American historian

Koenraad Wolter Swart
- Born: 16 October 1916; Rotterdam
- Died: 27 July 1992 (aged 75); Wassenaar
- Education: Leiden University
- Scientific career
- Fields: History of the Netherlands, History of France
- Workplaces: University of Illinois (1950–1952), Georgetown University (1952–1953), Brenau College (1954–1956), Agnes Scott College (1956–1966), University College London (1966–1983)
- Doctoral advisor: Johan Huizinga

Koenraad Wolter Swart (1916–1992) was a Dutch-American historian, best known for his work on the role of William of Orange in the Dutch Revolt, and for his doctoral dissertation on the relationship between the state and state functionaries in the seventeenth century.

== Life ==
Koenraad (Koen) Swart was born in Rotterdam on 16 October 1916. His father, Pieter C. Swart, was editor in chief of the Nieuwe Rotterdamsche Courant; his mother was J. G. Gratama. His father was the son of Lammert Swart commander of the Royal Netherlands East Indies Army and Chief of the Department of War in the Dutch East Indies. Swart was educated in The Hague and at the University of Leiden, where he took the candidature in Law before transferring to History. He was one of the last doctoral students to study under Johan Huizinga. His studies were interrupted by the Second World War and by his employment, in 1947—49, by the Dutch Institute for War Documentation, on whose behalf he attended the Nuremberg Trials.

After completing the requirements for his doctorate in 1949, Swart was employed at a series of American universities: the University of Illinois (1950–1952), Georgetown University (1952-1953), Brenau College (1954–1956), and Agnes Scott College (1956–1966), also doing some teaching at Emory University in Atlanta. During this time he became an American citizen. In 1966 he succeeded Ernst Kossmann as Professor of Dutch History and Institutions at University College London, holding the chair until his retirement in 1983. He spent most of the rest of his life in Wassenaar, dying there in 1992.

Among his publications, his description of the manner in which people at the time understood the Dutch miracle as an event so singular as to be like a miracle continues to be widely cited. Swart was elected a correspondent of the Royal Netherlands Academy of Arts and Sciences in 1967.

== Personal life ==
Swart married Ineke de Leng in 1950 and had four children Sonia (1952), Peter (1954), Stephanie (1957) and Philip (1961).

== Publications ==
=== Books ===
- Sale of Offices in the Seventeenth Century. The Hague: Martinus Nijhoff, 1949.
- The Sense of Decadence in Nineteenth-Century France. International Archives of the History of Ideas 7. The Hague: M. Nijhoff, 1964.
- Willem van Oranje en de Nederlandse opstand 1572-1584, bezorgd door R.P. Fagel, M.E.H.N. Mout, H.F.K. van Nierop. The Hague: Sdu, 1994.

English edition as William of Orange and the Revolt of the Netherlands, 1572-84; with introductory chapters by Alastair Duke and Jonathan I. Israel; edited by R.P. Fagel, M.E.H.N. Mout and H.F.K. van Nierop; translated by J.C. Grayson. St. Andrews Studies in Reformation History. Aldershot: Ashgate, 2003.

=== Articles, lectures and pamphlets ===
- "'Individualism' in the mid-19th century (1826-1860)", Journal of the History of Ideas 23 (1962).
- The Miracle of the Dutch Republic as Seen in the Seventeenth Century , inaugural lecture delivered at University College London 6 November 1967. London: published for the College by H. K. Lewis, [1969].
- "The Black Legend during the Eighty Years' War", in Britain and the Netherlands V: Some Political Mythologies, edited by J. S. Bromley and E. H. Kossmann. The Hague, 1975, pp. 36–57.
- William the Silent and the Revolt of the Netherlands. Historical Association General series 94. London: Historical Association, 1978.

Dutch edition as "Willem van Oranje en de Nederlandse Opstand", in Nassau en Oranje in de Nederlandse geschiedenis, edited by C.A. Tamse (Alphen aan den Rijn, 1979), pp. 45-80; reprinted in Vaderlands Verleden in Veelvoud, edited by C.B. Wels et al. (2nd edition, The Hague, 1980), vol. 1, pp. 99-132.

- "Wat bewoog Willem van Oranje de strijd tegen de Spaanse overheersing aan te binden?", Bijdragen en Mededelingen betreffende de Geschiedenis der Nederlanden 99 (1984), pp. 554–572.
- "The Foundation of the Dutch Republic", History Today 34:8 (1984).
