= Catrien Santing =

Dutch historian

- Born: 1958 (age 66–67); Meppel
- Education: Medieval history and Art history
- Alma mater: University of Groningen
- Scientific career
- Fields: History of the Netherlands; Cultural history; History of medicine
- Institutions: University of Groningen
- Thesis: Geneeskunde en humanisme: een intellectuele biografie van Theodericus Ulsenius (c. 1460-1508) (1992)
- Doctoral advisor: Arend Huussen
- Website: www.rug.nl/staff/c.g.santing/

Catharina Geertruida Santing (born 1958), commonly going by Catrien Santing, is a Dutch medievalist. Her research focuses on cultural history and medical history in the late-medieval and early-modern Low Countries.

== Career ==
Santing studied History and Art History at the University of Groningen, and worked as a lecturer in the same institution. She obtained her doctorate in 1992 with a thesis on the Renaissance physician Theodericus Ulsenius. She has since 2009 been full professor of Medieval History in Groningen. She has also served as chair of the editorial board of BMGN: Low Countries Historical Review.

== Publications ==
- Catrien Santing (ed.), De geschiedenis van de Middeleeuwen aan de Groningse universiteit 1614-1939 (Hilversum, 1997)
- Frank Huisman, Catrien Santing (eds.), Medische geschiedenis in regionaal perspectief: Groningen 1500-1900 (Rotterdam: Erasmus 1997)
- Catrien Santing, Henk te Velde, Margrith Wilke (eds.), Machtige lichamen. Het vingertje van Luns en andere politieke wapens (Amsterdam, 2005)
- Maarten Duijvendak, Hidde Feenstra, Martin Hillenga, Catrien Santing (eds.), Geschiedenis van Groningen, 3 vols. (Zwolle: Waanders, 2008)
- Hans Cools, Catrien Santing, Hans de Valk (eds.), Adrian VI: A Dutch Pope in a Roman Context (Turnhout: Brepols, 2012)
- C. G. Santing & J. J. Touber (eds.), Blood – Symbol – Liquid (Groningen Studies in Cultural Change; Leuven: Peeters, 2012).
- Catrien Santing, Barbara Baert & Anita Traninger (eds.), Disembodied Heads in Medieval and Early Modern Culture (Leiden: Brill Publishers, 2013)
