= Labaree =

Labaree is a surname. Notable people with the surname include:

- Benjamin Labaree (1801–1883), minister, professor and the longest serving president of Middlebury College from 1840 to 1866
- Benjamin Woods Labaree (1927–2021), historian of American colonial history and American maritime history
- David Labaree, American historian of education
- Leonard Woods Labaree (1897–1980), documentary editor, a professor of history at Yale University for over 40 years
