= Christopher Lubienski =

Education Policy Researcher

Christopher Lubienski is a professor of education policy at Indiana University, Bloomington, where he is also Director of the Center for Evaluation and Education Policy. He is an elected member of the National Academy of Education (US), and is a Fellow with the American Educational Research Association. He is also a Fellow at the National Education Policy Center, Guest Professor and Senior Research Fellow at the Center for Global Studies of Educational Leadership and Collaboration at East China Normal University in Shanghai, and adjunct professor at Murdoch University in Western Australia, where he also served as Sir Walter Murdoch Visiting Professor.

After receiving his Ph.D. in education policy at Michigan State University under David F. Labaree, Lubienski completed post-doctoral fellowships at the National Academy of Education and at Brown University under historian Carl Kaestle. He was also a Fulbright Senior Scholar in New Zealand, at the University of Waikato, and a Fellow for an invited writing residency at L’Institut d’études avancées de Paris / Paris Institute for Advanced Study.

== Work ==
Lubienski's research examines the political economy of education, with a focus on equitable opportunities for all students. He has used organizational theory to examine charter schools, and is a proponent of geospatial analyses in education research. He coauthored, with Sarah Theule Lubienski, the book, The Public School Advantage: Why Public Schools Outperform Private Schools, which won a 2015 PROSE Award in the category of Education Theory. He has also been examining global education reform.

Lubienski has published several books and over 100 articles.

== Books ==
Perry, L., Rowe, E., & Lubienski, C. (Eds.). (2024). Comparative Perspectives on School Segregation. London: Routledge.

Lubienski, C., Yemini, M., & Maxwell, C. (Eds.). (2022). The Rise of External Actors in Education: Shifting Boundaries Globally and Locally. Bristol, UK: Policy Press.

Lubienski, C., & Brewer, T. (Eds.). (2019). Learning to Teach in an Era of Privatization: Global Alternatives and Teacher Preparation. New York: Teachers College Press. —winner, 2020 Critics Choice Book Award, American Educational Studies Association

Ndimande, B., & Lubienski, C. (Eds.). (2017). Privatization and the Education of Marginalized Children: Policies, Impacts and Global Lessons. New York: Routledge.

Verger, A., Lubienski, C., & Steiner-Khamsi, G. (Eds.). (2016). The 2016 World Yearbook on Education: The Global Education Industry. New York: Routledge.

Lubienski, C., & Lubienski, S. T. (2014). The Public School Advantage: Why Public Schools Outperform Private Schools. Chicago, IL: University of Chicago Press. —2015 PROSE winner, American Publishers Award for Professional and Scholarly Excellence

Lubienski, C., & Weitzel, P. (Eds.). (2010). The Charter School Experiment: Expectations, Evidence, and Implications. Cambridge, MA: Harvard Education Press.

Feinberg, W., & Lubienski, C. (Eds.). (2008). School Choice Policies and Outcomes: Empirical and Philosophical Perspectives. Albany, NY: SUNY Press.

== Selected articles ==
Lubienski, C. (2023, March 8). School Choice Proposals Rarely Go before Voters – and Typically Fail When They Do. The Conversation. School choice proposals rarely go before voters – and typically fail when they do.

Perry, L., Rowe, E., & Lubienski, C. (2022). School Segregation: Theoretical Insights and Future Directions. Comparative Education 58 (1) 1–15. School segregation: theoretical insights and future directions

Malin, J. & Lubienski, C. (2022). Information Pollution in an Age of Populist Politics. Education Policy Analysis Archives 30 (94) https://doi.org/10.14507/epaa.30.6144

Wilson, G. & Lubienski, C. (2022, April). Democratic Representation and Charter School Governance. Phi Delta Kappan 103 (7) 47–50.

Lubienski, C., Perry, L. B., Kim, J., & Canbolat, Y. (2022). Market Models and Segregation: Examining Mechanisms of Student Sorting. Comparative Education 58 (1) 16–36.

Castillo, E., Owens, S., LaLonde, P. DeBray, E., Scott, J., & Lubienski, C. (2021). E-Advocacy among Intermediary Organizational Networks: How Social Media Platforms Help Distribute Evidence. Urban Education 56 (4) 581–609.

Lubienski, C. & Malin, J. (2021). Moving the Goalposts: The Evolution of Voucher Advocacy in Framing Research Findings. Journal of Education Policy 36 (6) 739–759.

Malin, J., Potterton, A., & Lubienski, C. (2021). Language Matters: K-12 Choice-Favoring and Public-Favoring Stories. Kappa Delta Pi Record, 57 (3) 104–109.

Lee, J. & Lubienski, C. (2021). A Spatial Analysis on Charter School Access in the New York Metropolitan Area. Teachers College Record, 123 (2) 1–30.

Hedges, S., Winton, S., Rowe, E., & Lubienski, C. (2020). Private Actors and Public Goods: A Comparative Case Study of Funding and Public Governance in K-12 Education in Three Global Cities. Journal of Educational Administration and History, 52 (1) 103–119. DOI: 10.1080/00220620.2019.1685474

DeBray, E., Hanley, J., Scott, J., & Lubienski, C. (2020). Money and Influence: Philanthropies, Intermediary Organizations, and Atlanta's 2017 School Board Election. Journal of Educational Administration and History, 52 (1) 63–79. Money and influence: philanthropies, intermediary organisations, and Atlanta’s 2017 school board election

Malin, J. R., Lubienski, C., & Mensa-Bonsu, Q. (2020). Media strategies in policy advocacy: Tracing the justifications for Indiana's school choice reforms. 2020 Politics of Education Yearbook/Educational Policy, 14(1), 118–143. Media Strategies in Policy Advocacy: Tracing the Justifications for Indiana’s School Choice Reforms Perry, L. B., & Lubienski, C. (2020). Between-School Stratification of Academic Curricular Offerings: School Decision-Making, Curriculum Policy Context, and the Educational Marketplace. Oxford Review of Education, 46 (5) 582–600. DOI: 10.1080/03054985.2020.1739012 Lubienski, C., Brewer, T.J, & Kim, J.A. (2019; published 2020). Privatisation et logique marchande dans l'éducation aux États-Unis. Revue Internationale d'éducation de Sèvres, 82, 57–66.

Lubienski, C., & Malin, J. (2019, June 7). School Vouchers Expand Despite Evidence of Negative Effects. The Conversation School vouchers expand despite evidence of negative effects

Malin, J., Hardy, I., & Lubienski, C. (2019). Educational Neoliberalization: The Mediatization of Ethical Assertions in the Voucher Debate. Discourse: Studies in the Cultural Politics of Education, 40 (3), 217–233.

Lubienski, C., & Perry, L. (2019). Third-Sector Competition, Innovation, and Diffusion: How Schools Interact Across and Within Sectors. Journal of Educational Administration, 57(4), 392–344.

Rowe, E., Lubienski, C., Skourdoumbis, A., Gerrard, J., & Hursh, D. (2019). Exploring Alternatives to the 'Neoliberalism' Critique: New Language for Contemporary Global Reform. Discourse: Studies in the Cultural Politics of Education, 40(2), 147–149.

Rowe, E., Lubienski, C., Skourdoumbis, A., & Hursch, D. (2019). Templates, Typologies and Typifications: Neoliberalism as Keyword. Discourse: Studies in the Cultural Politics of Education, 40 (3), 150–161.

Waitoller, F., & Lubienski, C. (2019). Disability, Race, and the Geography of School Choice: Towards an Intersectional Analytical Framework. AERA Open, 5(1).

Yoon, E., & Lubienski, C. (2018). Thinking Critically in Space: Toward a Mixed-Methods Geo-Spatial Analysis. Educational Researcher, 47 (1), 53–61.

Lubienski, C. (2018). The Critical Challenge: Policy Networks and Market Models for Education. Policy Futures in Education, 16 (2), 156–168.

Yoon, E., Gulson, K., & Lubienski, C. (2018). A Brief History of the Geography of Education Policy: Ongoing Conversations and Generative Tensions. AERA Open, 4 (4), 1–9.

Yoon, E., Lubienski, C., & Lee, J. (2018). The Geography of School Choice in a City with Growing Inequality: The Case of Vancouver. Journal of Education Policy, 33 (2), 279–298.

Verger, A., Steiner-Khamsi, G., & Lubienski, C. (2017). The Emerging Global Education Industry: Analysing Market-Making in Education through Market Sociology. Globalisation, Societies and Education, 15 (3), 325–340.

Lubienski, C., & Lubienski, S. T. (2017, June 16). Why School Vouchers Aren't Working. Education Week, 36 (36) 28.

Rowe, E., & Lubienski, C. (2017). Shopping for Schools and Shopping for Peers: Public Schools and Catchment Area Segregation. Journal of Education Policy, 32 (3), 340–356.

Gulson, K., Lewis, S., Lingard, B., Lubienski, C., Takayama, K., & Webb, T. (2017). Policy Mobilities and Methodology: A Proposition for Inventive Methods in Education Policy Studies. Critical Studies in Education, 58 (2), 224–241.

Yoon, E., & Lubienski, C. (2017). How Do Marginalized Families Engage in School Choice in Inequitable Urban Landscapes? A Critical Geographic Approach. Education Policy Analysis Archives, 25 doi: 10.14507/epaa.25.2655.

Lubienski, C., & Lee, J. (2017). Potential Uses of Mixed Methods GIS in Educational Research. Geographical Researcher, 55 (1) 89–99.

Lubienski, C. (2017). Neoliberalism, Resistance, and Self-Limiting Language. Education Policy Analysis Archives, 25 (60) http://dx.doi.org/10.14507/epaa.25.2991

Scott, J., DeBray, E., Lubienski, C., LaLonde, P., Castillo, E., & Owens, S. (2017). Urban Regimes, Intermediary Organization Networks, and Research Use: Patterns across Three School Districts. Peabody Journal of Education, 92 (1), 16–28.

Lee, J., & Lubienski, C. (2017). The Impact of School Closures on Equity of Access in Chicago. Education and Urban Society, 49 (1) 53–80.

Perry, L. B., Lubienski, C., & Ladwig, J. (2016). How Do Learning Environments Vary by School Sector and Socioeconomic Composition? Australian Journal of Education, 60 (3), 175–190.

Lubienski, C., & Brewer, T.J. (2016). An Analysis of Voucher Advocacy: Taking a Closer Look at the Uses and Limitations of "Gold Standard" Research. Peabody Journal of Education, 91(4) 455–472.

Lubienski, C. (2016). Sector Distinctions and the Privatization of Public Education Policymaking. Theory and Research in Education, 14 (3) 192–212.

Lubienski, C., Brewer, T.J., & Goel La Londe, P. (2016). Orchestrating Policy Ideas: Philanthropies and Think Tanks in US Education Policy Advocacy Networks. Australian Education Researcher, 43 (1) 55–73.

Lubienski, C., & Lee, J. (2016). Competitive Incentives and the Education Market: How Charter Schools Define Themselves in Metropolitan Detroit. Peabody Journal of Education, 91 (1) 64–80.

Rogers, J., Lubienski, C., Scott, J., & Welner, K. (2015). Missing the Target? The Parent Trigger as a Strategy for Parental Engagement and School Reform. Teachers College Record, 117 (6) 1–36.

Scott, J., Jabbar, H., LaLonde, P., DeBray, E., & Lubienski, C. (2015). Evidence Use and Advocacy Coalitions: Intermediary Organizations and Philanthropies in Denver, Colorado. Education Policy Analysis Archives, 23 (124).

LaLonde, P., Brewer, T. J., & Lubienski, C. (2015). The Proliferation of Teach For America around the Globe: Cloning Corporate Reform through Teach For All. Education Policy Analysis Archives, 23 (47).

Malin, J., & Lubienski, C. (2015). Educational Expertise, Advocacy, and Media Influence. Education Policy Analysis Archives, 23 (6).

Jabbar, H., Goel, P., DeBray, E., Scott, J., & Lubienski, C. (2014). How Policymakers Define "Evidence": The Politics of Research Use in New Orleans. Policy Futures in Education, 12 (8) 1013–1027.

Gulson, K., & Lubienski, C. (2014). The New Political Economy of Education Policy: Cultural Politics, Mobility and the Market. Knowledge Cultures, 2 (2) 170–180.

Lubienski, C. (2014). Re-Making the Middle: Dis-Intermediation in International Context. Educational Management Administration and Leadership, 42 (3) 422–439.

Perry, L., & Lubienski, C. (2014, March 13). Australian Schools: Engines of Inequality. The Conversation (Australia), Australian schools: engines of inequality.

DeBray, E., Scott, J., Lubienski, C., & Jabbar, H. (2014). Intermediary Organizations in Charter School Policy Coalitions: Evidence from New Orleans. Educational Policy, 28 (2), 175–206.

Goldie, D., Linick, M., Jabbar, H., & Lubienski, C. (2014). Using Bibliometric and Social Media Analyses to Explore the "Echo Chamber" Hypothesis. Educational Policy, 28 (2) 281–305. Lubienski, C., Scott, J., & DeBray, E. (2014). The Politics of Research Use in Education Policymaking. Educational Policy, 28 (2) 131–144.

Linick, M., & Lubienski, C. (2013). How Charter Schools Do, and Don't, Inspire Change in Traditional Public School Districts. Childhood Education, 89 (2), 99–104.

Lubienski, C. (2013). Privatizing Form or Function? Equity, Outcomes and Influence in American Charter Schools. Oxford Review of Education, 39 (4), 498–513.

Lubienski, C., Lee, J., & Gordon, L. (2013). Self-Managing Schools and Access for Disadvantaged Students: Organizational Behaviour and School Admissions. New Zealand Journal of Educational Studies, 48 (1), 82–98.

Lubienski, C., Puckett, T., & Brewer, T.J. (2013). Does Homeschooling "Work"? A Critique of the Empirical Claims and Agenda of Advocacy Organizations. Peabody Journal of Education, 88 (3), 378–392.

Malin, J., & Lubienski, C. (2013). Whose Opinion Counts in Educational Policymaking? Current Issues in Education, 16 (2), http://cie.asu.edu/ojs/index.php/cieatasu/article/view/1086.

Gulosino, C., & Lubienski, C. (2011). Schools' Strategic Responses to Competition in Segregated Urban Areas: Patterns in School Locations in Metropolitan Detroit. Education Policy Analysis Archives, 19 (13).

Lee, J., & Lubienski, C. (2011). Is Racial Segregation Changing in Charter Schools? International Journal of Educational Reform, 20 (3), 192–209.

Lubienski, C., & Linick, M. (2011). Quasi-Markets and Innovation in Education. Die Deutsche Schule, 103 (2), 139–157.

Lubienski, C., Scott, J., & DeBray, E. (2011). The Rise of Intermediary Organizations in Knowledge Production, Advocacy, and Educational Policy. Teachers College Record, Date Published: July 22, 2011 Teachers College Record ID Number: 16487.

Lubienski, C., & Garn, G. (2010). Evidence and Ideology on Consumer Choices in Education Markets: An Alternative Analytical Framework. Current Issues in Education, 13(3), 1–31.

+Lubienski, C., & Dougherty, J. (2009). Mapping Educational Opportunity: Spatial Analysis and School Choices. American Journal of Education, 115(4), 485–492.

Lubienski, C., Gulosino, C., & Weitzel, P. (2009). School Choice and Competitive Incentives: Mapping the Distribution of Educational Opportunities across Local Education Markets. American Journal of Education, 115(4), 601–647.

Lubienski, C., & Weitzel, P. (2009). Choice, Integration, and Educational Opportunity: Evidence on Competitive Incentives for Student Sorting in Charter Schools. The Journal of Gender, Race & Justice, 12 (2), 351–375.

Lubienski, C., Weitzel, P., & Lubienski, S.T. (2009). Is There a "Consensus" on School Choice and Achievement? Advocacy Research and the Emerging Political Economy of Knowledge Production. Educational Policy, 23 (1), 161–193.

Scott, J., Lubienski, C., & DeBray-Pelot, E. (2009). The Politics of Advocacy in Education. Educational Policy, 23 (1), 3–14.

Lubienski, C., Crane, C. C., & Lubienski, S. T. (2008, May). What Do We Know About School Effectiveness? Academic Gains in a Value-Added Analysis of Public and Private Schools. Phi Delta Kappan, 89 (9), 689–695.

Lubienski, C., & Weitzel, P. (2008). Empirical Evidence on the "Private School Effect" and the Efficacy of Vouchers in Boosting Academic Achievement. Brigham Young University Law Review, 2008 (2), 447–485.

Lubienski, S. T., Lubienski, C., & Crane, C. C. (2008). Achievement Differences and School Type: The Role of School Climate, Teacher Certification and Instruction. American Journal of Education, 115 (1), 97–138.

DeBray-Pelot, E., Lubienski, C., & Scott, J. (2007). The Institutional Landscape of Interest Group Politics and School Choice. Peabody Journal of Education, 82 (2–3), 204–230.

Lubienski, C. (2007). Marketing Schools: Consumer Goods and Competitive Incentives for Consumer Information. Education and Urban Society, 40 (1), 118–141.

Lubienski, C. (2006). Incentives for School Diversification: Competition and Promotional Patterns in Local Education Markets. Journal of School Choice, 1 (2), 1–31.

Lubienski, C. (2006). School Choice and Privatization in Education: An Alternative Analytical Framework. Journal for Critical Education Policy Studies, 4 (1). School Choice and Privatization in Education: An Alternative Analytical Framework.

Lubienski, C. (2006). School Diversification in Second-Best Education Markets: International Evidence and Conflicting Theories of Change. Educational Policy, 20 (2), 323–344.

Lubienski, C., & Lubienski, S.T. (2006). Charter Schools, Academic Achievement and NCLB. Journal of School Choice, 1 (3), 55–62.

Lubienski, S. T., & Lubienski, C. (2006). School Sector and Academic Achievement: A Multi-Level Analysis of NAEP Mathematics Data. American Educational Research Journal, 43 (4), 651–698.

Lubienski, S. T., & Lubienski, C. (2006, March 8). What NAEP Can Tell Us about School Achievement. Commentary for Education Week, 25 (26), 28, 30.

Lubienski, C. (2005). Public Schools in Marketized Environments: Shifting Incentives and Unintended Consequences of Competition-Based Educational Reforms. American Journal of Education, 111 (4), 464–486.

Lubienski, C. (2005). School Choice as a Civil Right: District Responses to Competition and Equal Educational Opportunity. Equity & Excellence in Education, 38 (4) 331–341.

Lubienski, S. T., & Lubienski, C. (2005). A New Look at Public and Private Schools: Student Background and Mathematics Achievement. Phi Delta Kappan, 86 (9), 696–699.

Lubienski, C. (2003). A Critical View of Home Education. Evaluation and Research in Education, 17 (2/3), 167–178.

Lubienski, C. (2003). Does Homeschooling Promote the Public Good? Congressional Quarterly Researcher, 13 (2), 41.

Lubienski, C. (2003). Innovation in Education Markets: Theory and Evidence on the Impact of Competition and Choice in Charter Schools. American Educational Research Journal, 40 (2), 394–443.

Lubienski, C. (2003). Instrumentalist Perspectives on the "Public" in Public Education: Incentives and Purposes. Educational Policy, 17 (4), 478–502.

Lubienski, C. (2001). Redefining "Public" Education: Charter Schools, Common Schools, and the Rhetoric of Reform. Teachers College Record, 103 (4), 634–666.

Lubienski, C. (2000). Whither the Common Good? A Critique of Home Schooling. Peabody Journal of Education, 75 (2), 207–232.
