= Wim Blockmans =

Belgian history professor (born 1945)

Professor W. P. Blockmans
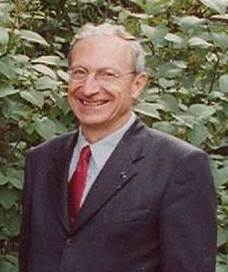
- Wim Blockmans (2002)
- Born: Willem Pieter Blockmans; May 26, 1945 (age 81)

Academic background
- Education: University of Ghent
- Thesis: De volksvertegenwoordiging in Vlaanderen onder het huis van Bourgondië (1384–1506) (1973)
- Doctoral advisor: Walter Prevenier

Academic work
- Discipline: History
- Sub-discipline: late-medieval and early-modern Europe
- Institutions: Leiden University
- Doctoral students: Hans Cools
- Main interests: Burgundian Netherlands
- Website: www.unige.ch/ihr/fr/equipe/professeurs-honoraires/backus/

Willem Pieter Blockmans (born 26 May 1945, Antwerp, Belgium) is a retired Professor of Medieval History at Leiden University. He earned a PhD from the University of Ghent. He has been Rector of the Netherlands Institute for Advanced Study since September 2002. He has published extensively on late medieval and early modern state power.

Blockmans was elected a member of the Royal Netherlands Academy of Arts and Sciences in 1990. In 1996, he was elected a member of the Academia Europaea. Blockmans was elected a corresponding Fellow of the British Academy in 2003. In 2008, he was made Knight of the Order of the Netherlands Lion.

His retirement was marked with two Festschriften, Power and Persuasion: Essays on the Art of State Building in Honour of W.P. Blockmans, edited by Peter Hoppenbrouwers, Antheun Janse and Robert Stein (Turnhout, Brepols, 2010), and Bourgondië voorbij: De Nederlanden, 1250–1650. Liber alumnorum Wim Blockmans, edited by Mario Damen and Louis Sicking (Hilversum, Verloren, 2010).

== Publications ==
- with Charles Tilly, Cities and the Rise of States in Europe, A.D. 1000 to 1800 (1994)
- Emperor Charles V, 1500-1558 (London 2002)
- Introduction to Medieval Europe 300-1550 (London/New York 2007)
- with Walter Prevenier, The Promised Lands: The Low Countries Under Burgundian Rule, 1369-1530 (2010)
