= Hans Cools =

Hans Cools (historian)
- Born: 1969

Academic background
- Education: Our Lady College, Antwerp
- Alma mater: University of Antwerp, University of Ghent, University of Amsterdam
- Thesis: Mannen met macht. Edellieden en de Moderne Staat in de Bourgondisch-Habsburgse Landen, ca. 1475 - ca. 1530 (2000)
- Academic advisors: Henk van Nierop, Wim Blockmans

Academic work
- Discipline: History
- Sub-discipline: Early modern Europe
- Institutions: Leiden University, Royal Netherlands Institute in Rome, Fryske Akademy, KU Leuven
- Website: kuleuven.academia.edu/CoolsHans

Hans Cools (born 1969) is a historian of early-modern Europe. He is a professor at the KU Leuven and a senior research fellow of the Fryske Akademy.

== Career ==
Cools studied history and philosophy at the universities of Antwerp, Lille and Ghent. He was a researcher at the European University Institute in Florence and completed his doctorate at the University of Amsterdam. His thesis, on the nobility in the Burgundian and Habsburg Netherlands, was supervised by Henk van Nierop and Wim Blockmans. It charted the networks of patronage and fealty that tied the nobility to the crown.

Cools briefly worked at Leiden University (1999-2003) and the Royal Netherlands Institute in Rome (2003-2006) before taking up a position as a lecturer at the KU Leuven. Together with Steven Gunn and David Grummitt, he has studied war as a factor in the formation of political identities in England and the Low Countries in the late fifteenth and early sixteenth centuries.

In March 2015 he was interviewed on VRT Radio 1 about the 16th-century Iconoclastic Fury in the Low Countries, to provide perspective on the destruction of cultural heritage by ISIL then in the news.

== Publications ==
Monographs

- Hans Cools, Mannen met macht. Edellieden en de Moderne Staat in de Bourgondisch-Habsburgse Landen. ca. 1475 – ca. 1530 (Zutphen, 2001; reprinted 2015) ISBN 9789060116258
- Hans Cools and Hans de Valk, Institutum Neerlandicum. MCMIV-MMIV. Honderd jaar Nederlands Instituut te Rome (Hilversum, 2004) ISBN 9789065508249
- Steven Gunn, David Grummitt and Hans Cools, War, State and Society in England and the Netherlands, 1477-1559 (Oxford, 2007) ISBN 9780199207503

Edited volumes

- Your Humble Servant: Agents in Early Modern Europe, edited by Hans Cools, Marika Keblusek and Badeloch Noldus (Hilversum, 2006) ISBN 9789065509086.
- Fiandre e Italia tra monarchia universale e Stati territoriali: cultura politica e dinamiche sociali, edited by Bruno Boute, Hans Cools and Maria Antonietta Visceglia (Rome, 2010) ISBN 9788843054442
- Adrian VI: A Dutch Pope in a Roman Context, edited by Hans Cools, Catrien Santing and Hans de Valk (Turnhout, 2012) ISBN 9782503545363
- Het gelijk van de Gouden Eeuw. Recht en onrecht in de Republiek (1550-1750). Essays voor Henk van Nierop, edited by Michiel van Groesen, Judith Pollmann and Hans Cools (Hilversum, 2014) ISBN 9789087044534
- Fryske Akademy, three centuries of building history, edited by Hans Cools (Leeuwarden, 2016) ISBN 9789492176325.
- Erasmus en de Friezen, Friezen en Erasmus, edited by J. Bloemendal and H. Cools (Leeuwarden, 2016)

Chapters and articles

- Hans Cools, "An Italian in the Metropolis: The Amsterdam Career of Francesco Feroni (ca. 1640-1672)", in D. Vanysacker et al. eds., The Quintessence of Lives: Intellectual Biographies in the Low Countries presented to Jan Roegiers (Turnhout: Brepols, 2010), 227-247.
