= Lammert Swart =

Dutch East Indies Army general

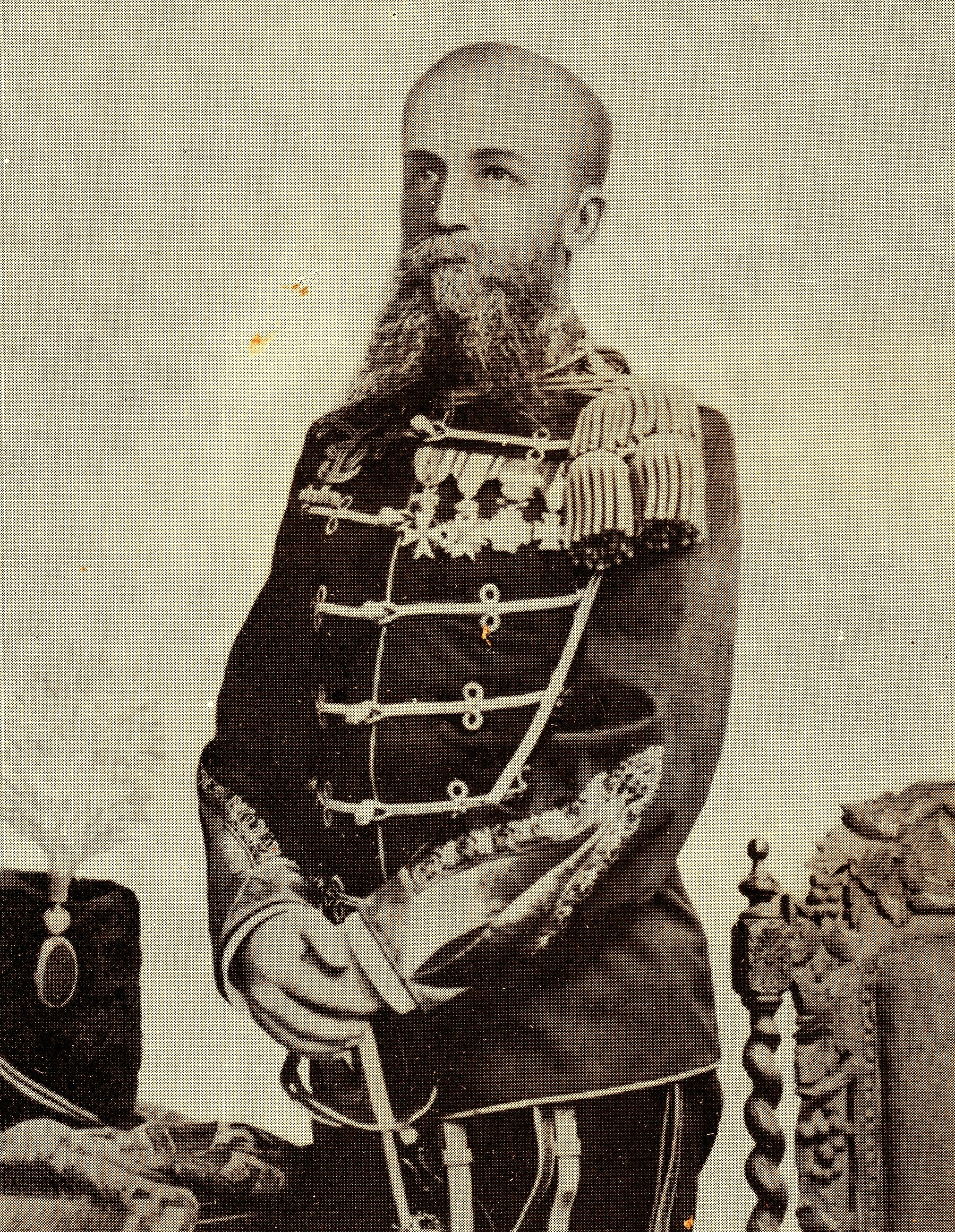
Lieutenant-generaal Lammert Swart

Lieutenant-General Lammert Swart (1847 – The Hague, January 16, 1909) was commander of the Royal Netherlands East Indies Army and Chief of the Department of War in the Dutch East Indies.

== Sources ==
- 1909. R. Luitenant generaal Swart. In memoriam. Indisch Militair Tijdschrift. Bladzijde 209-212.
