= Royal Zeeland Scientific Society =

Dutch scientific society

The Koninklijk Zeeuwsch Genootschap der Wetenschappen (KZGW) or Royal Zeeland Scientific Society in English, commonly referred to as the "Zeeuwse Genoothschap" is a Dutch scientific society that was founded in 1769 to promote the practice of Arts and Sciences in the province of Zeeland in the Netherlands.

The society itself has no museum but instead lends its extensive collections to various museums, libraries and other institutions. However, the society publishes a quarterly journal named Zeeland with topics relating to history, culture, nature and the regional economy. Moreover, it annually publishes its works regarding larger works of the society.
