= Theodericus Ulsenius =

Theodericus Ulsenius, the Latin version of the Frisian Dirk van Ulsen (c. 1460—c. 1508), was a Renaissance humanist and physician. Born in Zwolle, in the present-day Netherlands, he spent much of his career in Germany; his career took him to Nuremberg, Augsburg, Mainz, Freiburg, and Cologne. In Nuremberg he knew the humanists Conrad Celtes and Sebald Schreyer and consequently came into contact with Hartmann Schedel and the artist Albrecht Dürer.

Ulsenius was primarily a physician, but also concerned himself with the nature of medicine and doctors in Renaissance society. In Nuremberg he overturned the medieval Galenic classifications and reorganised the university medical curriculum. Regarding the role of physician as equal to that of humanistic scholars, Ulsenius proposed the role of a doctor as requiring a high ethical standard, beyond fiscal rewards. During the German syphilis epidemic of 1496 he published a poem approaching the disease from both medical and astrological perspectives.

Ulsenius returned to his native country in 1507 where he died the following year and was buried in St John's Cathedral at 's-Hertogenbosch.

== Sources ==
- Bryan S Turner, Review of C G. Santing, Geneeskunde en humanisme. Een intellectuele biografie van Theodericus Ulsenius (c 1460-1508), Rotterdam: Erasmus Publishing, 1992, in Social History of Medicine 7, 1994.
