= Henk van Nierop =

Dutch historian

Professor Henk van Nierop
- Born: 1949

Academic background
- Education: University of Amsterdam, Leiden University
- Thesis: Van ridders tot regenten: de Hollandse adel in de zestiende en de eerste helft van de zeventiende eeuw (1984)
- Doctoral advisor: Jan Juliaan Woltjer

Academic work
- Discipline: Modern history
- Sub-discipline: Early modern Europe
- Institutions: University of Amsterdam
- Doctoral students: Hans Cools
- Main interests: Dutch Revolt, Dutch Golden Age
- Notable works: Treason in the Northern Quarter (2009)
- Website: www.uva.nl/profiel/n/i/h.f.k.vannierop/h.f.k.vannierop.html

Hendrik Frans Karel van Nierop (born 1949) is a historian of early-modern Holland and professor emeritus of the University of Amsterdam.

== Career ==
Nierop took part in student demonstrations in Amsterdam in May 1969, occupying the university's administrative centre. He graduated from the University of Amsterdam in 1974 and in 1984 obtained a doctorate from Leiden University with a thesis on the transformation of Holland's ruling class between 1500 and 1650. He taught at the University of Amsterdam, where in 1999 he was appointed Professor of Early Modern History. He was the director of the Amsterdam Centre for the Study of the Dutch Golden Age from 2000 to 2008, and an editor of the Amsterdam University Press series "Amsterdam Studies in the Dutch Golden Age". He retired in June 2014. A Festschrift was produced for the occasion, under the title Het gelijk van de Gouden Eeuw, edited by Michiel van Groesen, Judith Pollmann and Hans Cools (Hilversum, 2014).

== Publications ==
Books

- Beeldenstorm en burgerlijk verzet in Amsterdam, 1566-1567 (Nijmegen, SUN, 1978).
- Van ridders tot regenten. De Hollandse adel in de zestiende en de eerste helft van de zeventiende eeuw (De Bataafsche Leeuw, 1984).

- The Nobility of Holland: From Knights to Regents, 1500-1650, translated by Maarten Ultee (Cambridge University Press, 1993).

- Het verraad van het Noorderkwartier. Oorlog, terreur en recht in de Nederlandse Opstand (Amsterdam, Bert Bakker, 1999)

- Treason in the Northern Quarter: War, Terror, and the Rule of Law in the Dutch Revolt, translated by J. C. Grayson (Princeton University Press, 2009).

- The Life of Romeyn de Hooghe, 1645-1708: Prints, Pamphlets, and Politics in the Dutch Golden Age (Amsterdam University Press, 2018)

Edited volumes

- K. W. Swart, Willem van Oranje en de Nederlandse opstand 1572-1584, edited by R.P. Fagel, M.E.H.N. Mout and H.F.K. van Nierop (The Hague, 1994)

- William of Orange and the Revolt of the Netherlands, 1572-84, translated by J.C. Grayson (St. Andrews Studies in Reformation History; Ashgate, 2003)

- The Education of a Christian Society: Humanism and the Reformation in Britain and the Netherlands, edited by N. Scott Amos, Andrew Pettegree and Henk Van Nierop (Aldershot, Ashgate, 1999)
- Reformation, Revolt and Civil War in France and the Netherlands, 1555-1585, edited by Philip Benedict, Guido Marnef, Henk van Nierop and Marc Venard (Amsterdam, Koninklijke Nederlandse Akademie van Wetenschappen, 1999)
- Calvinism and Religious Toleration in the Dutch Golden Age, edited by Ronnie Po-chia Hsia and Henk van Nierop (Cambridge University Press, 2002)
- Colonial Empires Compared: Britain and the Netherlands, 1750–1850, edited by Bob Moore and Henk van Nierop (Ashgate, 2003)
- Twentieth-Century Mass Society in Britain and the Netherlands, edited by Bob Moore and Henk F. K. van Nierop (Oxford, Berg, 2006)
- Catholic Minorities in Protestant States: Britain and the Netherlands, c. 1570-1720, edited by Benjamin Kaplan, Bob Moore, Henk van Nierop and Judith Pollmann (Manchester University Press, 2009)
