= David Labaree =

American historian of education

- Occupation: Historian of education

David F. Labaree is a historian of education and Lee L. Jacks Professor of Education at Stanford University.

== Works ==
- A Perfect Mess: The Unlikely Ascendancy of American Higher Education (2017)
- Someone Has to Fail: The Zero-Sum Game of Public Schooling (2010)
- The Trouble with Ed Schools (2004)
- How to Succeed in School Without Really Learning: The Credentials Race in American Education (1997)
- The Making of an American High School: The Credentials Market and the Central High School of Philadelphia, 1838–1939 (1988)
