= List of 2015–16 Pro12 transfers =

This is a list of player transfers involving Pro12 teams before or during the 2015–16 season.

== Benetton Treviso ==
=== Players in ===
- (Italy) Simone Ferrari from (Italy) AS Rugby Milano
- (South Africa) Duncan Naude from (France) RC Chalon
- (Italy) Jean-François Montauriol from (Italy) Rovigo Delta
- (Italy) Andrea De Marchi from (Italy) Rovigo Delta
- (Samoa) Filo Paulo from (Wales) Cardiff Blues
- (Italy) Robert Barbieri from (England) Leicester Tigers
- (Italy) Alberto De Marchi from (England) Sale Sharks
- (Italy) Luke McLean from (England) Sale Sharks
- (England) Tom Palmer from (England) Gloucester Rugby
- (Italy) Luca Bigi from (Italy) Petrarca
- (Italy) Filippo Filippetto from (Italy) San Donà
- (Italy) Ornel Gega from (Italy) Mogliano
- (South Africa) Braam Steyn from (Italy) Calvisano
- (Italy) Cherif Traorè from (Italy) Viadana
- (Italy) Tommaso Iannone from (Italy) Zebre
- (New Zealand) Chris Smylie from (New Zealand) Hurricanes
- (Italy) Roberto Santamaria from (Italy) Viadana

=== Players out ===
- (Italy) Simone Favaro to (Scotland) Glasgow Warriors
- (Italy) Michele Campagnaro to (England) Exeter Chiefs
- (England) Joe Carlisle to (England) London Welsh
- (Italy) Corniel van Zyl retired
- (Italy) Paul Derbyshire to (Italy) Zebre
- (Italy) Giovanni Maistri to (Italy) Petrarca
- (Italy) Antonio Pavanello retired
- (Italy) Ruggero Trevisan retired
- (Argentina) Romulo Acosta to (Italy) Petrarca
- (Australia) Albert Anae to (Australia) Brumbies
- (Italy) Amar Kudin to (Italy) San Dona
- (New Zealand) Mat Luamanu to (England) Harlequins
- (Argentina) Tomás Vallejos to (France) Stade Français Paris
- (Argentina) Josè Francisco Novak to (France) UAL Rugby
- (Italy) Nicola Cattina to (Italy) Patarò Lumezzane
- (Argentina) Bruno Mercanti to (Spain) Bizkaia Gernika
- (South Africa) Meyer Swanepoel released
- (Fiji) Henry Seniloli released

== Cardiff Blues ==
=== Players in ===
- (Wales) Tom James from (England) Exeter Chiefs
- (Samoa) Rey Lee-Lo from (New Zealand) Hurricanes
- (United States) Blaine Scully from (England) Leicester Tigers
- (United States) Cam Dolan from (England) Northampton Saints
- (Wales) James Down from (England) London Welsh
- Nicky Griffiths from Wales Sevens

=== Players out ===
- (Wales) Rory Watts-Jones retired
- (Samoa) Filo Paulo to (Italy) Benetton Treviso
- (Wales) Adam Jones to (England) Harlequins
- (Argentina) Joaquin Tuculet to (Argentina) Jaguares
- (Wales) Dafydd Hewitt retired
- (England) Simon Humberstone to (England) Doncaster Knights
- (Wales) Tom Williams to (Wales) Scarlets (season-loan)
- (Wales) Marc Breeze to (Wales) Cardiff RFC
- (Argentina) Lucas González Amorosino to (Ireland) Munster

== Connacht ==
=== Players in ===
- (Ireland) Ultan Dillane promoted from academy
- (South Africa) Quinn Roux from (Ireland) Leinster
- (Ireland) Eoghan Masterson promoted from academy
- (Ireland) Caolin Blade promoted from academy
- (Ireland) John Cooney from (Ireland) Leinster
- (New Zealand) Nepia Fox-Matamua from (New Zealand) Auckland
- (Ireland) Ben Marshall from (Ireland) Leinster
- Api Pewhairangi from New Zealand Warriors
- (United States) AJ MacGinty from (United States) Life Running Eagles

=== Players out ===
- (Ireland) Willie Faloon to (Ireland) Ulster
- (England) Michael Swift retired
- (New Zealand) Mils Muliaina to (Italy) Zebre
- (Ireland) Mick Kearney to (Ireland) Leinster
- Shane Layden to Ireland Sevens
- (New Zealand) Miah Nikora to (Italy) Petrarca
- (Ireland) Seán Henry retired
- (Tonga) Mata Fifita to (Ireland) Galway Tribesmen

== Edinburgh ==
=== Players in ===
- (Tonga) William Helu from (England) Wasps
- (New Zealand) Nasi Manu from (New Zealand) Highlanders
- (England) Nathan Fowles from (England) Sale Sharks
- (Ireland) Michael Allen from (Ireland) Ulster
- (Scotland) Jack Cosgrove from (England) Worcester Warriors
- (Scotland) John Hardie from (New Zealand) Highlanders

=== Players out ===
- (Scotland) Tom Heathcote to (England) Worcester Warriors
- (Scotland) Grayson Hart to (Scotland) Glasgow Warriors
- (Scotland) Ollie Atkins to (England) Exeter Chiefs
- (Scotland) Tim Visser to (England) Harlequins
- (Scotland) Hugh Blake to (Scotland) Glasgow Warriors
- (Scotland) Roddy Grant retired

== Glasgow Warriors ==
=== Players in ===
- (Italy) Simone Favaro from (Italy) Benetton Treviso
- (Scotland) Grayson Hart from (Scotland) Edinburgh
- (Georgia (country)) Shalva Mamukashvili from (England) Sale Sharks
- (Scotland) Kieran Low from (England) London Irish
- (Scotland) Mike Blair from (England) Newcastle Falcons
- (Australia) Sam Johnson from (Australia) Queensland Reds
- (United States) Greg Peterson from (England) Leicester Tigers
- (Fiji) Taqele Naiyaravoro from (Australia) NSW Waratahs
- (Wales) Javan Sebastian from (Wales) Scarlets
- (Scotland) Jason Hill from (Scotland) Heriot's Rugby Club
- (England) Rory Clegg from (England) Newcastle Falcons
- (Scotland) Gary Strain from (Scotland) Glasgow Hawks
- (Scotland) Steven Findlay from (Scotland) Glasgow Hawks
- (Scotland) Hugh Blake from (Scotland) Edinburgh
- (Fiji) Junior Bulumakau from (Scotland) SCOTS British Army
- (Tonga) Sila Puafisi from (England) Gloucester Rugby

=== Players out ===
- (Fiji) Nikola Matawalu to (England) Bath Rugby
- (Scotland) Sean Maitland to (England) London Irish
- (Canada) D. T. H. van der Merwe to (Wales) Scarlets
- (Scotland) Dougie Hall retired
- (Scotland) Jon Welsh to (England) Newcastle Falcons
- (Scotland) Alastair Kellock retired
- (Scotland) Murray McConnell to (England) Nottingham
- (Ireland) James Downey to (England) Wasps
- (Scotland) Tommy Spinks to (England) Jersey
- (Scotland) Euan Murray to (France) Pau
- Connor Braid to Canada Sevens
- (South Africa) Rossouw de Klerk to (France) Grenoble

== Leinster ==
=== Players in ===
- (Ireland) Johnny Sexton from (France) Racing 92
- (Ireland) Royce Burke-Flynn from (Ireland) Clontarf
- (Ireland) Ed Byrne promoted from Academy
- (Ireland) Bryan Byrne promoted from Academy
- (Ireland) Ian Hirst from (Ireland) Clontarf
- (Ireland) Mick Kearney from (Ireland) Connacht
- (Ireland) Dan Leavy promoted from Academy
- (Ireland) Cathal Marsh promoted from Academy
- (Ireland) Josh van der Flier promoted from Academy
- (Fiji) Isa Nacewa from (New Zealand) Blues
- (Ireland) Tadhg Beirne promoted from Academy
- (Ireland) Gavin Thornbury promoted from Academy
- (New Zealand) Hayden Triggs from (New Zealand) Blues

=== Players out ===
- (New Zealand) Jimmy Gopperth to (England) Wasps
- (Ireland) John Cooney to (Ireland) Connacht
- (Ireland) Jordan Coghlan to (Ireland) Munster
- (South Africa) Quinn Roux to (Ireland) Connacht
- (Ireland) Shane Jennings retired
- (Ireland) Sam Coghlan Murray to (England) Nottingham
- (Ireland) Gordon D'Arcy retired
- (Ireland) Seán McCarthy to (England) Jersey
- (Ireland) Brendan Macken to (England) Wasps
- (Ireland) Ben Marshall to (Ireland) Connacht
- (Australia) Kane Douglas to (Australia) Queensland Reds
- (Ireland) Tyrone Moran to (England) London Scottish
- (Ireland) Kevin McLaughlin retired

== Munster ==
=== Players in ===
- (Ireland) Tomás O'Leary from (England) London Irish
- (Ireland) Jordan Coghlan from (Ireland) Leinster
- (New Zealand) Francis Saili from (New Zealand) Blues
- (Ireland) Matt D'Arcy from (Ireland) Clontarf
- (Australia) Mark Chisholm from (France) Bayonne
- (Ireland) Shane Monahan from (England) Gloucester
- (Uruguay) Mario Sagario from (France) Massy
- (Argentina) Lucas González Amorosino from (Wales) Cardiff Blues
- (Australia) Sean Doyle from (Australia) Brumbies

=== Players out ===
- (Ireland) JJ Hanrahan to (England) Northampton Saints
- (Ireland) Sean Dougall to (France) Pau
- (Ireland) Damien Varley retired
- (Ireland) Alan Cotter to (France) Aix-en-Provence
- (Ireland) Paddy Butler to (France) Pau
- (Ireland) Paul O'Connell to (France) Toulon
- (Ireland) Luke O'Dea to (France) SC Lille
- (Ireland) Barry O'Mahony retired
- (Ireland) Johne Murphy retired
- (Ireland) Donncha O'Callaghan to (England) Worcester Warriors
- (Australia) Andrew Smith to (Australia) Brumbies
- (Ireland) Felix Jones retired
- (Argentina) Eusebio Guiñazú released
- (Ireland) Ivan Dineen released
- (Ireland) Martin Kelly released

== Newport Gwent Dragons ==
=== Players in ===
- (South Africa) Sarel Pretorius from (South Africa) Free State Cheetahs
- (England) Ed Jackson from (England) Wasps
- (England) Charlie Davies from (England) Wasps
- (Wales) Adam Warren from (Wales) Scarlets
- (England) Nick Scott from (England) London Welsh
- (England) Shaun Knight from (England) Gloucester Rugby

=== Players out ===
- (Wales) Steffan Jones to (England) Bedford Blues
- (Wales) Jonathan Evans to (England) Bath Rugby
- (Wales) Owen Evans to (England) Harlequins
- (Wales) Lee Byrne retired
- (Wales) Ian Gough retired
- (Wales) Ashley Smith retired
- (Scotland) Dave Young to (England) London Scottish
- (England) Dan Way retired
- (Wales) Andy Powell to (Wales) Merthyr RFC
- (Wales) Richie Rees to (Wales) Cross Keys RFC

== Ospreys ==
=== Players in ===
- (Wales) Paul James from (England) Bath Rugby
- (New Zealand) Brendon Leonard from (Italy) Zebre
- (Wales) Gareth Delve from (Japan) NEC Green Rockets
- (Wales) Kristian Phillips from (Wales) Scarlets
- (England) Oliver Tomaszczyk from (England) Newcastle Falcons
- (Tonga) Ma'afu Fia from (New Zealand) Highlanders

=== Players out ===
- (Wales) Nicky Thomas to (England) Gloucester Rugby
- (Wales) Sam Lewis to (England) Worcester Warriors
- (Wales) Duncan Jones retired
- (Wales) Morgan Allen to (Wales) Scarlets
- (Fiji) Aisea Natoga to (France) US Carcassonne
- (Wales) Ross Jones to (England) Rotherham Titans
- (Fiji) Tevita Cavubati to (England) Worcester Warriors
- (Wales) Andrew Bishop retired
- (Wales) Tom Smith retired
- (South Africa) De Kock Steenkamp released
- (Wales) Cai Griffiths to (Italy) AS Rugby Milano

== Scarlets ==
=== Players in ===
- (Canada) D. T. H. van der Merwe from (Scotland) Glasgow Warriors
- (Wales) Aled Thomas from (England) Gloucester Rugby
- (Wales) Will Taylor from (England) Wasps
- (England) Tom Price from (England) Leicester Tigers
- (Australia) Dylan Evans from (Australia) NSW Country Eagles
- (Wales) Jack Condy from (Wales) Cross Keys
- (Wales) Morgan Allen from (Wales) Ospreys
- (Wales) Tom Williams from (Wales) Cardiff Blues (season-loan)

=== Players out ===
- (Wales) Rhys Priestland to (England) Bath Rugby
- (Wales) Darran Harris to (England) Rotherham Titans
- (South Africa) Jacobie Adriaanse to (France) Montpellier
- (Wales) Sion Bennett to (England) Northampton Saints
- (Wales) Kyle Evans to (England) Moseley
- (Wales) Adam Warren to (Wales) Newport Gwent Dragons
- (South Africa) Joe Snyman to (France) CA Brive
- (Wales) Javan Sebastian to (Scotland) Glasgow Warriors
- (Wales) Kristian Phillips to (Wales) Ospreys
- (Wales) Richard Kelly retired
- (New Zealand) Frazier Climo to (Scotland) Ayr RFC
- (Wales) Rob McCusker to (England) London Irish

== Ulster ==
=== Players in ===
- (Ireland) Willie Faloon from (Ireland) Connacht
- (Australia) Sam Windsor from (England) Worcester Warriors
- (Ireland) Paul Rowley from (England) London Welsh
- (England) Peter Browne from (England) London Welsh
- (Ireland) John Andrew promoted from Academy
- (Ireland) Alan O'Connor promoted from Academy

=== Players out ===
- (Ireland) Charlie Butterworth to (England) Jersey
- (Ireland) Ross Adair to (England) Jersey
- (Ireland) Declan Fitzpatrick retired
- (Ireland) Michael Allen to (Scotland) Edinburgh Rugby
- (Ireland) Ricky Andrew to (England) Nottingham
- (Ireland) Michael Heaney to (England) Doncaster Knights
- (Ireland) Dave Ryan to (France) Agen
- (Ireland) Neil McComb to (Ireland) Belfast Harlequins
- (Ireland) Mike McComish released

== Zebre ==
=== Players in ===
- (New Zealand) Mils Muliaina from (Ireland) Connacht
- (Australia) Luke Burgess from (Australia) Melbourne Rebels
- (Italy) Pietro Ceccarelli from (France) AS Macon
- (Italy) Marcello Violi from (Italy) Calvisano
- (Italy) Federico Ruzza from (Italy) Viadana
- (Italy) Tommaso Boni from (Italy) Mogliano
- (South Africa) Kayle van Zyl from (Italy) Mogliano
- (Italy) Carlo Canna from (Italy) Fiamme Oro
- (Argentina) Emiliano Coria from (France) Montpellier
- (Italy) Emiliano Caffini from (Italy) Rovigo Delta
- (Argentina) Guillermo Roan from (Italy) Rovigo Delta
- (Italy) Paul Derbyshire from (Italy) Benetton Treviso
- (Argentina) Bruno Postiglioni from (Argentina) La Plata
- (South Africa) Jean Cook from (South Africa) Cheetahs
- (South Africa) Ulrich Beyers from (France) Bordeaux Begles
- (South Africa) Johan Meyer from (South Africa) Sharks

=== Players out ===
- (New Zealand) Brendon Leonard to (Wales) Ospreys
- (South Africa) Andries Ferreira to (South Africa) Lions
- (Italy) Samuela Vunisa to (England) Saracens
- (Italy) Giovanbattista Venditti to (England) Newcastle Falcons
- (Italy) Mauro Bergamasco retired
- (Italy) Luca Redolfini to (Italy) Rugby Reggio
- (Italy) Luciano Orquera to (France) RC Massy
- (Italy) Tommaso Iannone to (Italy) Benetton Treviso
- (Argentina) Luciano Leibson to (France) RC Massy
- (Moldova) Andrei Mahu to (Italy) Lyons Piacenza
- (Italy) Alberto Chillon to (Italy) Rovigo Delta
- (Italy) Lorenzo Romano to (Italy) Viadana
- (Italy) David Odiete to (Italy) Mogliano
- (South Africa) Hennie Daniller to (South Africa) Boland Cavaliers
- (Italy) Matías Agüero to (England) Leicester Tigers

== See also ==
- List of 2015–16 Premiership Rugby transfers
- List of 2015–16 Top 14 transfers
- List of 2015–16 Super Rugby transfers
- List of 2015–16 RFU Championship transfers
- List of 2015 SuperLiga transfers
