= 2012–13 Munster Rugby season =

- Ground(s): Thomond Park (Capacity: 26,500); Musgrave Park (Capacity: 8,500)
- CEO: Garrett Fitzgerald
- Coach: Rob Penney
- Captain: Doug Howlett
- League: Pro12
- 2012–13: 6th

The 2012–13 Munster Rugby season was Munster's twelfth season competing in the Pro12, alongside which they also competed in the Heineken Cup. It was Rob Penney's first season as head coach.

== Summary ==
Munster were drawn in pool 1 for the 2012–13 Heineken Cup, alongside Scottish Pro12 rivals and semi-finals of the previous seasons competition Edinburgh, English Premiership side Saracens and French Top 14 side Racing Métro 92. Hew head coach Rob Penney appointed Doug Howlett as the new squad captain ahead of the 2012–13 season. Munster opened their Heineken Cup campaign with a 22–17 away defeat against Racing Métro 92 on 13 October 2012. 8 days later, Munster won 33–0 in their round 2 home fixture against Edinburgh. In the December back-to-backs against Saracens in rounds 3 and 4, Munster won 15–9 at home, before being defeated 19–13 away. Munster won 26–17 away from home against Edinburgh on 13 January 2013. One week later, Munster beat Racing Métro 92 29–6 at home to secure the second 'best runner-up' spot and advance to the tournament knockout stage. In their quarter-final against English team Harlequins on 7 April 2013, Munster produced an immense performance, captained by Paul O'Connell in the absence of Doug Howlett, to win 18–12 away from home. In the semi-final on 27 April 2018, Munster were beaten 16–10 by French side Clermont, despite a gallant effort in the second half in the Stade de la Mosson. The match turned out to by club legend Ronan O'Gara's final appearance for Munster, as he announced his retirement from rugby a few weeks later. Squad captain and another club legend, Doug Howlett, was forced to retire after a shoulder injury suffered against Glasgow Warriors in March 2013. Munster finished 6th in the 2012–13 Pro12 regular season with 11 wins, 10 defeats and 1 draw, missing out on the play-offs.

== 2012–13 Playing Squad ==
=== Players in ===
- (Ireland) Sean Dougall from (England) Rotherham Titans
- (Ireland) James Downey from (England) Northampton Saints
- (New Zealand) Casey Laulala from (Wales) Cardiff Blues
- (South Africa) CJ Stander from (South Africa) Blue Bulls / Bulls
- (Ireland) Christy Condon from (Ireland) Dolphin
- (Ireland) Barry O'Mahony from (Ireland) Clontarf
- (Ireland) Alan Cotter promoted from Academy
- (Ireland) JJ Hanrahan promoted from Academy
- (Ireland) Luke O'Dea promoted from Academy
- (Ireland) Dave O'Callaghan promoted from Academy
- (Ireland) Cathal Sheridan promoted from Academy

=== Players out ===
- (New Zealand) Lifeimi Mafi to (France) Perpignan
- (Ireland) Tomás O'Leary to (England) London Irish
- (Ireland) Denis Fogarty to (France) Aurillac
- (Ireland) Jerry Flannery retired
- (Ireland) Mick O'Driscoll retired
- (Ireland) Denis Leamy retired
- (Ireland) David Wallace retired
- (Ireland) John Hayes retired
- (Ireland) Darragh Hurley retired
- (Ireland) Tom Gleeson released
- (Ireland) Declan Cusack released
- (New Zealand) Peter Borlase released

Note: Flags indicate national union under World Rugby eligibility rules. Players may hold more than one non-World Rugby nationality.

Player	Position	Union
Seán Henry	Hooker	Ireland
Mike Sherry	Hooker	Ireland
Damien Varley	Hooker	Ireland
Stephen Archer	Prop	Ireland
BJ Botha	Prop	South Africa
Christy Condon	Prop	Ireland
Alan Cotter	Prop	Ireland
Marcus Horan	Prop	Ireland
Dave Kilcoyne	Prop	Ireland
Wian du Preez	Prop	South Africa
John Ryan	Prop	Ireland
Dave Foley	Lock	Ireland
Ian Nagle	Lock	Ireland
Donncha O'Callaghan	Lock	Ireland
Paul O'Connell	Lock	Ireland
Donnacha Ryan	Lock	Ireland
Sean Dougall	Flanker	Ireland
Billy Holland	Flanker	Ireland
Tommy O'Donnell	Flanker	Ireland
Barry O'Mahony	Flanker	Ireland
Peter O'Mahony	Flanker	Ireland
Niall Ronan	Flanker	Ireland
Paddy Butler	Number 8	Ireland
James Coughlan	Number 8	Ireland
CJ Stander	Number 8	South Africa

Player	Position	Union
Conor Murray	Scrum-half	Ireland
Cathal Sheridan	Scrum-half	Ireland
Peter Stringer	Scrum-half	Ireland
Duncan Williams	Scrum-half	Ireland
Scott Deasy	Fly-half	Ireland
JJ Hanrahan	Fly-half	Ireland
Ian Keatley	Fly-half	Ireland
Ronan O'Gara	Fly-half	Ireland
Danny Barnes	Centre	Ireland
Ivan Dineen	Centre	Ireland
James Downey	Centre	Ireland
Casey Laulala	Centre	New Zealand
Keith Earls	Wing	Ireland
Doug Howlett (c)	Wing	New Zealand
Johne Murphy	Wing	Ireland
Luke O'Dea	Wing	Ireland
Simon Zebo	Wing	Ireland
Denis Hurley	Fullback	Ireland
Felix Jones	Fullback	Ireland
Seán Scanlon	Fullback	Ireland

== Pre-season ==
10 August 2012

La Rochelle (France)	31–7	(Ireland) Munster
	Report

Stade Marcel-Deflandre

17 August 2012

Munster (Ireland)	24–9	(England) Bristol
	Report

Musgrave Park

24 August 2012

Munster (Ireland)	10–34	(England) London Irish
	Report

Musgrave Park

== 2012–13 Pro12 ==
Pro12 table
	Club	Played	Won	Drawn	Lost	Points For	Points Against	Points Difference	Tries For	Tries Against	Try Bonus	Losing Bonus	Points
1	(Ireland) Ulster (RU)	22	17	1	4	577	348	+229	62	33	8	3	81
2	(Ireland) Leinster (CH)	22	17	0	5	585	386	+199	63	46	9	1	78
3	(Scotland) Glasgow Warriors (SF)	22	16	0	6	541	324	+217	66	30	9	3	76
4	(Wales) Scarlets (SF)	22	15	0	7	436	406	+30	41	37	3	3	66
5	(Wales) Ospreys	22	14	1	7	471	342	+129	48	25	2	2	62
6	(Ireland) Munster	22	11	1	10	442	389	+53	46	34	4	4	54
7	(Italy) Benetton Treviso	22	10	2	10	414	450	–36	45	44	4	2	50
8	(Ireland) Connacht	22	8	1	13	358	422	–64	32	43	1	3	38
9	(Wales) Cardiff Blues	22	8	0	14	348	487	–139	28	51	1	5	38
10	(Scotland) Edinburgh	22	7	0	15	399	504	–105	35	51	1	7	36
11	(Wales) Newport Gwent Dragons	22	6	0	16	358	589	–231	31	72	1	3	28
12	(Italy) Zebre	22	0	0	22	291	573	–282	29	60	1	9	10
If teams are level at any stage, tiebreakers are applied in the following order: 1. number of matches won; 2. the difference between points for and points against; 3. the number of tries scored; 4. the most points scored; 5. the difference between tries for and tries against; 6. the fewest red cards received; 7. the fewest yellow cards received.
Green background (rows 1 to 4) are play-off places. Qualification for the Heineken Cup is based on each country's allocation, i.e. three highest–ranked Irish teams, three highest–ranked Welsh teams, both Italian teams and both Scottish teams. Leinster won the Amlin Challenge Cup, giving Ireland an extra Heineken Cup place that passed to Connacht. Updated 17 May 2013. Source: RaboDirect PRO12

1 September 2012
20:00

Edinburgh (Scotland)	18–23	(Ireland) Munster
	Report

Murrayfield
Attendance: 4,050
Referee: Leighton Hodges (WRU)

7 September 2012
20:00

Munster (Ireland)	19–6	(Italy) Treviso
	Report

Thomond Park
Attendance: 15,642
Referee: Andrew McMenemy (SRU)

14 September 2012
19:05

Ulster (Ireland)	20–19	(Ireland) Munster
	Report

Ravenhill
Attendance: 10,397
Referee: Alain Rolland (IRFU)

22 September 2012
20:00

Munster (Ireland)	33–13	(Wales) Newport Gwent Dragons
	Report

Thomond Park
Attendance: 15,064
Referee: Marius Mitrea (FIR)

29 September 2012
18:30

Ospreys (Wales)	30–15	(Ireland) Munster
	Report

Liberty Stadium
Attendance: 8,652
Referee: Dudley Phillips (IRFU)

6 October 2012
18:30

Leinster (Ireland)	30–21	(Ireland) Munster
	Report

Aviva Stadium
Attendance: 46,280
Referee: Leighton Hodges (WRU)

26 October 2012
19:45

Munster (Ireland)	29–3	(Italy) Zebre
	Report

Thomond Park
Attendance: 14,738
Referee: Neil Hennessy (WRU)

2 November 2012
19:05

Cardiff Blues (Wales)	18–24	(Ireland) Munster
	Report

Cardiff Arms Park
Attendance: 8,064
Referee: Andrew McMenemy (SRU)

25 November 2012
17:15

Munster (Ireland)	6–13	(Wales) Scarlets
	Report

Musgrave Park
Attendance: 6,219
Referee: Laurent Cardona (FFR)

22 December 2012
17:15

Connacht (Ireland)	12–16	(Ireland) Munster
	Report

Galway Sportsgrounds
Attendance: 7,789
Referee: Dudley Phillips (IRFU)

29 December 2012
17:30

Munster (Ireland)	24–10	(Ireland) Ulster
	Report

Thomond Park
Attendance: 23,587
Referee: Alain Rolland (IRFU)

5 January 2013
19:30

Munster (Ireland)	6–17	(Wales) Cardiff Blues
	Report

Musgrave Park
Attendance: 8,874
Referee: Nigel Owens (WRU)

9 February 2013
19:45

Munster (Ireland)	30–3	(Scotland) Edinburgh
	Report

Musgrave Park
Attendance: 7,241

16 February 2013
18:30

Scarlets (Wales)	18–10	(Ireland) Munster
	Report

Parc y Scarlets
Attendance: 7,124
Referee: Dudley Phillips (IRFU)

24 February 2013
15:00

Treviso (Italy)	34–10	(Ireland) Munster
	Report

Stadio Comunale di Monigo
Attendance: 2,200
Referee: Neil Paterson (SRU)

2 March 2013
18:30

Munster (Ireland)	13–13	(Wales) Ospreys
	Report

Thomond Park
Attendance: 17,748
Referee: Nigel Owens (WRU)

23 March 2013
17:45

Munster (Ireland)	22–0	(Ireland) Connacht
	Report

Musgrave Park
Attendance: 8,203
Referee: Alain Rolland (IRFU)

29 March 2013
20:05

Glasgow Warriors (Scotland)	51–25	(Ireland) Munster
	Report

Scotstoun Stadium
Attendance: 5,692
Referee: Leighton Hodges (WRU)

13 April 2013
18:30

Munster (Ireland)	16–22	(Ireland) Leinster
	Report

Thomond Park
Attendance: 23,037
Referee: Nigel Owens (WRU)

19 April 2013
19:00

Newport Gwent Dragons (Wales)	30–24	(Ireland) Munster
	Report

Rodney Parade
Attendance: 7,523
Referee: Claudio Blessano (FIR)

3 May 2013
19:45

Zebre (Italy)	25–27	(Ireland) Munster
	Report

Stadio Sergio Lanfranchi
Attendance: 2,500
Referee: Andrew McMenemy (SRU)

== 2012–13 Heineken Cup ==
=== Pool 1 ===
Team	P	W	D	L	PF	PA	Diff	TF	TA	TB	LB	Pts
(England) Saracens [4]	6	5	0	1	180	76	+104	15	6	2	1	23
(Ireland) Munster [8]	6	4	0	2	133	73	+60	14	4	2	2	20
(France) Racing Métro	6	3	0	3	103	125	−22	7	11	0	0	12
(Scotland) Edinburgh	6	0	0	6	36	178	−142	3	18	0	0	0

13 October 2012
14:35

Racing Métro 92 (France)	22–17	(Ireland) Munster
	Report

Stade de France
Attendance: 21,102
Referee: Greg Garner (RFU)

21 October 2012
12:45

Munster (Ireland)	33–0	(Scotland) Edinburgh
	Report

Thomond Park
Attendance: 22,146
Referee: Wayne Barnes (RFU)

8 December 2012
18:00

Munster (Ireland)	15–9	(England) Saracens
	Report

Thomond Park
Attendance: 25,600
Referee: Pascal Gaüzère (FFR)

16 December 2012
15:00

Saracens (England)	19–13	(Ireland) Munster
	Report

Vicarage Road
Attendance: 15,288
Referee: Pascal Gaüzère (FFR)

13 January 2013
12:45

Edinburgh (Scotland)	17–26	(Ireland) Munster
	Report

Murrayfield
Attendance: 6,220
Referee: Pascal Gaüzère (FFR)

20 January 2013
12:45

Munster (Ireland)	29–6	(France) Racing Métro 92
	Report

Thomond Park
Attendance: 25,600
Referee: Wayne Barnes (RFU)

=== Quarter-final ===
7 April 2013
14:00

Harlequins (England)	12–18	(Ireland) Munster
	Report

Twickenham Stoop
Attendance: 14,810
Referee: Jérôme Garcès (FFR)

=== Semi-final ===
27 April 2013
18:00

Clermont (France)	16–10	(Ireland) Munster
	Report

Stade de la Mosson
Attendance: 31,259
Referee: Nigel Owens (WRU)
