= 2015 Currie Cup qualification =

Domestic rugby union competition

- Countries: South Africa
- Date: 12 June – 25 July 2015
- Promoted: Griquas
- Matches played: 21
- Tries scored: 157 (average 7.5 per match)
- Top point scorer: Adriaan Engelbrecht (62)
- Top try scorer: Carel Greeff (10)

The 2015 Currie Cup qualification tournament was a competition organised by the South African Rugby Union which featured seven teams and was played between 12 June and 25 July 2015. The winner of the tournament would qualify for the 2015 Currie Cup Premier Division, while the remaining six teams would play in the 2015 Currie Cup First Division.

For the second season in succession, Griquas won the tournament to earn a place in the Premier Division.

== Competition rules and information ==
The top six teams from 2014 – Western Province, Golden Lions, Sharks, Blue Bulls, Free State Cheetahs and Pumas – were guaranteed participation in the 2015 Currie Cup Premier Division, as is the 'anchor' side Eastern Province Kings.

2014 Currie Cup Premier Division side Griquas, by virtue of finishing outside the top six in the Premier Division, as well as the teams from the 2014 Currie Cup First Division – the Leopards, Griffons, SWD Eagles, Falcons, Boland Cavaliers and Border Bulldogs – played in a qualifying tournament, with the winner qualifying to the 2015 Currie Cup Premier Division.

The seven teams played each other once over the course of the qualification, either at home or away. Teams received four points for a win and two points for a draw. Bonus points were awarded to teams that scored 4 or more tries in a game, as well as to teams that lost a match by 7 points or less. Teams were ranked by log points, then points difference (points scored less points conceded).

The top team qualified for the 2015 Currie Cup Premier Division, while the other six teams qualified for the 2015 Currie Cup First Division.

In November 2014, the Kenya RFU revealed that they were in negotiations with SARU to enter a team in the competition. However, they withdrew from the 2015 Vodacom Cup due to financial considerations and were not included in the Currie Cup fixtures when those were released.

== Teams ==
Location of teams in 2015 Currie Cup qualification

The same seven teams that took part in the 2014 Currie Cup qualification tournament also played in the 2015 edition.

The following teams took part in the 2015 Currie Cup qualification tournament:

2015 Currie Cup qualification teams
Team	Sponsored Name	Stadium/s	Sponsored Name
Boland Cavaliers	Regent Boland Cavaliers	Boland Stadium, Wellington	Boland Stadium
Border Bulldogs	Border Bulldogs	Buffalo City Stadium, East London	Buffalo City Stadium
Falcons	Falcons	Barnard Stadium, Kempton Park	Barnard Stadium
Griffons	Down Touch Griffons	North West Stadium, Welkom	HT Pelatona Projects Stadium
Griquas	ORC Griquas	Griqua Park, Kimberley	Griqua Park
Leopards	Leopards	Olën Park, Potchefstroom	Profert Olën Park
SWD Eagles	SWD Eagles	Outeniqua Park, George	Outeniqua Park

== Log ==
The final league standings for the 2015 Currie Cup qualification tournament are:

2015 Currie Cup qualification log
Pos	Team	Pld	W	D	L	PF	PA	PD	TF	TA	TB	LB	Pts	Qualification
1	Griquas	6	5	0	1	254	132	+122	39	17	5	1	26	2015 Currie Cup Premier Division
2	Leopards	6	5	0	1	237	117	+120	34	17	5	0	25	2015 Currie Cup First Division
3	Falcons	6	3	0	3	148	209	−61	20	29	2	0	14	2015 Currie Cup First Division
4	Boland Cavaliers	6	2	1	3	138	197	−59	18	25	2	1	13	2015 Currie Cup First Division
5	Griffons	6	2	0	4	171	201	−30	22	29	2	1	11	2015 Currie Cup First Division
6	Border Bulldogs	6	2	0	4	95	136	−41	10	18	0	2	10	2015 Currie Cup First Division
7	SWD Eagles	6	1	1	4	123	174	−51	14	22	0	2	8	2015 Currie Cup First Division

Rules for classification: 4 points for a win; 2 points for a draw; 1 bonus point for a loss by seven points or less; 1 bonus point for scoring four or more tries in a match

=== Round-by-round ===
The table below shows a team's progression throughout the season.

For each round, each team's cumulative points total is shown with the overall log position in brackets.

Team Progression – 2015 Currie Cup qualification
Team	R1	R2	R3	R4	R5	R6	R7
Griquas	1 (4th)	6 (2nd)	11 (1st)	16 (1st)	16 (1st)	21 (1st)	26 (1st)
Leopards	5 (1st)	10 (1st)	10 (2nd)	10 (2nd)	15 (2nd)	20 (1st)	25 (2nd)
Falcons	0 (5th)	0 (7th)	4 (6th)	8 (5th)	8 (6th)	9 (6th)	14 (3rd)
Boland Cavaliers	5 (2nd)	5 (3rd)	6 (4th)	8 (4th)	13 (3rd)	13 (3rd)	13 (4th)
Griffons	0 (6th)	4 (5th)	4 (5th)	4 (6th)	5 (7th)	10 (4th)	11 (5th)
Border Bulldogs	4 (3rd)	4 (4th)	8 (3rd)	9 (3rd)	10 (4th)	10 (5th)	10 (6th)
SWD Eagles	0 (7th)	1 (6th)	2 (7th)	4 (7th)	8 (5th)	8 (7th)	8 (7th)
Key:	win	draw	loss	bye			

== Fixtures and results ==
The following fixtures for the 2015 Currie Cup qualification series were released:

=== Round One ===
12 June 2015	Border Bulldogs	20–13	Griquas	Buffalo City Stadium, East London
19:00	Try: Sipho Nofemele 49'; Lukhanyo Am 55'; Makazole Mapimpi 77'; Con: Masixole Banda 78' (1/3); Pen: Masixole Banda 3' (1/1); Cards: Buhle Mxunyelwa (yellow card) 41' to 51'	Report; Scoreboard	Try: Stephan Kotzé 45'; Con: Gouws Prinsloo 46' (1/1); Pen: Gouws Prinsloo 21', 80' (2/3)	Referee: Rodney Boneparte

12 June 2015	SWD Eagles	17–45	Leopards	Outeniqua Park, George
19:00	Try: Elric van Vuuren 7'; Wayne Khan 62'; Con: Elric van Vuuren 8', 63' (2/2); Pen: Elric van Vuuren 1' (1/1); Cards: Janneman Stander (yellow card) 40' to 50'	Report; Scoreboard	Try: Joe Smith 22'; Wian Fourie 35'; Adri Jacobs 47', 53', 79'; Sergio Torrens 61'; Con: Adriaan Engelbrecht 23', 36', 48', 54', 62', 80' (6/6); Pen: Adriaan Engelbrecht 6' (1/2)	Referee: Francois Pretorius

13 June 2015	Boland Cavaliers	32–22	Griffons	Malmesbury Sports Grounds, Malmesbury
15:00	Try: Senan van der Merwe 15', 24'; Hanno Kitshoff 22'; Wilneth Engelbrecht 36'; Con: Eric Zana 16', 23', 37' (3/4); Pen: Eric Zana 10', 62' (2/2); Cards: Hanno Kitshoff (yellow card) 39' to 49'	Report; Scoreboard	Try: Rudi Britz 34'; Alvin Brandt 42'; Tertius Maarman 66'; Con: Louis Strydom 43', 67' (2/3); Pen: Louis Strydom 54' (1/1)	Referee: Stephan Geldenhuys

Bye/s: Falcons

=== Round Two ===
20 June 2015	Leopards	53–7	Falcons	Olën Park, Potchefstroom
14:30	Try: Adri Jacobs 5', 44', 51'; Rhyno Smith 8'; Adrian Vermeulen 48'; Loftus Morrison 64'; Robert Kruger 80'; Con: Adriaan Engelbrecht 6', 9', 49', 52', 65', 81' (6/7); Pen: Adriaan Engelbrecht 15' (1/1); Drop: Rhyno Smith 22' (1/1)	Report; Scoreboard	Try: Jaco Oosthuizen 55'; Con: Jaun Kotzé 56' (1/1)	Referee: Quinton Immelman

20 June 2015	Griffons	25–21	SWD Eagles	HT Pelatona Projects Stadium, Welkom
15:00	Try: Nicky Steyn 27'; Elgar Watts 62'; Tertius Maarman 71'; Con: Elgar Watts 28', 63' (2/3); Pen: Elgar Watts 15' (1/3); Franna du Toit 80' (1/1)	Report; Scoreboard	Try: Janneman Stander 7'; Alshaun Bock 50', 57'; Con: Gerrit Smith 8', 51', 58' (3/3); Pen: Gerrit Smith (0/3); Cards: Dean Hopp (yellow card) 61' to 73'	Referee: Pro Legoete

20 June 2015	Griquas	48–17	Boland Cavaliers	Griqua Park, Kimberley
15:00	Try: Carel Greeff 3', 10', 28', 65'; Riaan Viljoen 5'; Steph Roberts 42'; Rudi van Rooyen 72'; Jono Janse van Rensburg 78'; Con: Francois Brummer 4', 11', 29', 73' (4/7); Riaan Viljoen (0/1); Pen: Francois Brummer (0/1)	Report; Scoreboard	Try: Hanno Kitshoff 56'; Christian Rust 79'; Con: Eric Zana 57', 80' (2/2); Pen: Eric Zana 32' (1/2); Cards: Yves Bashiya (yellow card) 77'	Referee: Stephan Geldenhuys

Bye/s: Border Bulldogs

=== Round Three ===
27 June 2015	Boland Cavaliers	15–22	Border Bulldogs	Boland Stadium, Wellington
14:00	Try: Adriaan Carelse 76'; Chaney Willemse 79'; Con: Christian Rust 77' (1/2); Pen: Eric Zana 14' (1/5); Cards: Clemen Lewis (yellow card) 29' to 39'	Report; Scoreboard	Try: Masixole Banda 30', 51'; Ntando Kebe 45'; Con: Masixole Banda 31', 52' (2/3); Pen: Masixole Banda 36' (1/1)	Referee: Francois Pretorius

27 June 2015	Falcons	22–17	SWD Eagles	Barnard Stadium, Kempton Park
14:30	Try: Friedle Olivier 31'; Jaco Oosthuizen 68'; Coert Cronjé 75'; Con: Jaun Kotzé 32', 69' (2/3); Pen: Jaun Kotzé 29' (1/2); Drop: Jaun Kotzé (0/1)	Report; Scoreboard	Try: Wayne Khan 39'; Christo du Plessis 46'; Gerrit Smith 53'; Con: Elric van Vuuren 46' (1/3); Pen: Elric van Vuuren (0/1); Cards: Leighton Eksteen (yellow card) 25' to 35'; Andisa Ntsila (yellow card) 61' to 71'	Referee: Pro Legoete

27 June 2015	Leopards	21–48	Griquas	Olën Park, Potchefstroom
14:30	Try: Rhyno Smith 28'; Damian Engledoe 70'; Loftus Morrison 79'; Con: Adriaan Engelbrecht 29', 71', 80' (3/3); Cards: Marno Redelinghuys (yellow card) 30' to 41'	Report; Scoreboard	Try: Riaan Viljoen 11', 23'; Johnathan Francke 16'; Carel Greeff 18'; Hilton Lobberts 34'; Clinton Swart 37'; Francois Brummer 64'; RJ Liebenberg 76'; Con: Gouws Prinsloo 12', 24', 38', 65' (4/8); Cards: Tian Meyer (yellow card) 26' to 36'	Referee: Ben Crouse

Bye/s: Griffons

=== Round Four ===
3 July 2015	Border Bulldogs	12–13	Falcons	Buffalo City Stadium, East London
19:00	Pen: Masixole Banda 18' (1/1); Logan Basson 39', 48', 60' (3/3); Cards: Wandile Putuma (yellow card) 55' to 66'; Blake Kyd (yellow card) 56' to 66'	Report; Scoreboard	Try: penalty try 56'; Con: Jaun Kotzé 57' (1/1); Pen: Jaun Kotzé 13', 46' (2/4)	Referee: AJ Jacobs

3 July 2015	SWD Eagles	28–28	Boland Cavaliers	Outeniqua Park, George
19:00	Try: Johan Steyn 34'; Con: Elric van Vuuren 35' (1/1); Pen: Elric van Vuuren 4', 9', 17', 19', 29', 65', 78' (7/8)	Report; Scoreboard	Try: Danwel Demas 38', 59'; Yves Bashiya 67'; Con: Eric Zana 60', 68' (2/3); Pen: Eric Zana 32', 37' (2/2); Adriaan Carelse 79' (1/1); Cards: Edwin Sass (yellow card) 18'	Referee: Stephan Geldenhuys

4 July 2015	Griquas	47–20	Griffons	Griqua Park, Kimberley
15:15	Try: Johnathan Francke 32'; Carel Greeff 48'; Tian Meyer 51'; Ntabeni Dukisa 57'; Francois Brummer 60'; Hugo Kloppers 70'; Martin Bezuidenhout 75'; Con: Gouws Prinsloo 33', 49', 52', 61', 71', 76' (6/7)	Report; Scoreboard	Try: Vuyo Mbotho 78'; Norman Nelson 80'; Con: Louis Strydom 79' (1/1); Wynand Pienaar 80' (1/1); Pen: Franna du Toit 7', 31' (2/3); Drop: Tertius Maarman (0/1)	Referee: Lourens van der Merwe

Bye/s: Leopards

=== Round Five ===
10 July 2015	SWD Eagles	19–13	Border Bulldogs	Outeniqua Park, George
19:00	Try: Martin du Toit 7'; Leighton Eksteen 10'; Christo du Plessis 55'; Con: Gerrit Smith 8', 11' (2/3); Pen: Gerrit Smith (0/1); Cards: Dean Hopp (yellow card) 69' to 79'; Ashley Buys (yellow card) 79'	Report; Scoreboard	Try: Ludwe Booi 73'; Con: Logan Basson 74' (1/1); Pen: Logan Basson 4', 46' (2/2)	Referee: Quinton Immelman

11 July 2015	Boland Cavaliers	29–16	Falcons	Boland Stadium, Wellington
14:30	Try: Adriaan Carelse 49'; Eric Zana 68', 83'; Danwel Demas 75'; Con: Eric Zana 50', 69', 76' (3/3); Ryno Conradie (0/1); Pen: Eric Zana (0/1); Drop: Adriaan Carelse 16' (1/1)	Report; Scoreboard	Try: Marlyn Williams 57'; Con: Jaun Kotzé 58' (1/1); Pen: Jaun Kotzé 28', 37', 40' (3/4)	Referee: Rodney Boneparte

11 July 2015	Griffons	20–24	Leopards	HT Pelatona Projects Stadium, Welkom
15:00	Try: Tertius Maarman 15'; Vuyo Mbotho 17'; Con: Louis Strydom 16', 18' (2/2); Pen: Louis Strydom 35', 43' (2/2)	Report; Scoreboard	Try: Adrian Vermeulen 10'; Tyler Fisher 23'; Hanco Venter 49'; Damian Engledoe 53'; Con: Adriaan Engelbrecht 50', 54' (2/4)	Referee: Jaco van Heerden

Bye/s: Griquas

=== Round Six ===
18 July 2015	Falcons	33–57	Griquas	Barnard Stadium, Kempton Park
14:30	Try: Kyle Hendricks 11', 59', 65', 77'; Arno Poley 70'; Con: Jaun Kotzé 12', 60', 66', 71' (4/5); Cards: Jaun Kotzé (yellow card) 35' to 45'	Report; Scoreboard	Try: AJ Coertzen 3', 24'; Carel Greeff 33', 56'; Tian Meyer 36'; Johnathan Francke 38'; Ntabeni Dukisa 41'; Clinton Swart 46'; Jono Janse van Rensburg 81'; Con: Gouws Prinsloo 4', 34', 37', 39', 47', 57' (6/8); Riaan Viljoen (0/1)	Referee: Jaco van Heerden

18 July 2015	Leopards	61–17	Boland Cavaliers	Olën Park, Potchefstroom
14:30	Try: Dillon Smit 4', 20'; Ashlon Davids 8'; Rhyno Smith 26', 77'; Tyler Fisher 34'; Adrian Vermeulen 41'; Sizo Maseko 65'; Damian Engledoe 80'; Con: Adriaan Engelbrecht 5', 9', 21', 35', 42', 66', 78', 81' (8/9); Cards: Tyler Fisher (yellow card) 68' to 78'	Report; Scoreboard	Try: Arno Fortuin 32'; Danwel Demas 37'; Eric Zana 59'; Con: Eric Zana (0/2); Christian Rust 60' (1/1); Pen: Eric Zana (0/2); Cards: Arno Fortuin (yellow card) 74'	Referee: Quinton Immelman

18 July 2015	Griffons	43–20	Border Bulldogs	HT Pelatona Projects Stadium, Welkom
15:00	Try: Tertius Maarman 2'; Nicky Steyn 26', 41'; Alvin Brandt 59'; Japie Nel 70'; Vuyo Mbotho 79'; Con: Franna du Toit 3', 42' (2/3); Louis Strydom 60', 71', 80' (3/3); Pen: Franna du Toit 34' (1/1)	Report; Scoreboard	Try: penalty try 50'; Michael Makase 76'; Con: Oliver Zono 51', 77' (2/2); Pen: Logan Basson 17', 20' (2/3)	Referee: Pro Legoete

Bye/s: SWD Eagles

=== Round Seven ===
24 July 2015	Falcons	57–41	Griffons	Barnard Stadium, Kempton Park
15:00	Try: Coert Cronjé 1', 39'; Anrich Richter 10'; Grant Janke 15', 60'; Ernst Ladendorf 37'; Jaun Kotzé 41'; Kyle Hendricks 70'; Friedle Olivier 80'; Con: Jaun Kotzé 1', 10', 15', 37', 42', 61' (6/9)	Report; Scoreboard	Try: Alvin Brandt 21', 75'; Enver Brandt 28'; Joe van der Hoogt 45', 54'; Nicky Steyn 63'; Con: Louis Strydom 21', 46', 55', 64' (4/5); Wynand Pienaar (0/1); Pen: Louis Strydom 34' (1/1)	Attendance: 50; Referee: Rodney Boneparte

25 July 2015	Border Bulldogs	8–33	Leopards	Buffalo City Stadium, East London
14:00	Try: Michael Makase 2'; Con: Masixole Banda (0/1); Pen: Masixole Banda (0/1); Logan Basson 69' (1/1)	Report; Scoreboard	Try: Hanco Venter 14'; Loftus Morrison 33'; Joe Smith 49', 65'; Wian Fourie 79'; Con: Adriaan Engelbrecht 15', 34', 66' (3/4); Rhyno Smith 80' (1/1)	Referee: Francois Pretorius

25 July 2015	Griquas	41–21	SWD Eagles	Griqua Park, Kimberley
15:00	Try: Carel Greeff 24', 48'; Michael van der Spuy 37'; Ntabeni Dukisa 41'; AJ Coertzen 75'; Martin Bezuidenhout 77'; Con: Gouws Prinsloo 38', 42', 49', 78' (4/6); Pen: Gouws Prinsloo 66' (1/1)	Report; Scoreboard	Try: Gerrit Smith 28'; Luzuko Vulindlu 62'; Con: Gerrit Smith 63' (1/2); Pen: Gerrit Smith 12', 32', 40' (3/4)	Referee: Marius van der Westhuizen

Bye/s: Boland Cavaliers

== Honours ==
The honour roll for the 2015 Currie Cup qualification tournament was as follows:

2015 Currie Cup qualification honours
Promoted:	Griquas
Top Try Scorer:	Carel Greeff, Griquas (10)
Top Points Scorer:	Adriaan Engelbrecht, Leopards (62)

== Players ==
=== Player statistics ===
The following table contain points which were scored in the 2015 Currie Cup qualification tournament:

All point scorers
No	Player	Team	T	C	P	DG	Pts
1	Adriaan Engelbrecht	Leopards	0	28	2	0	62
2	Jaun Kotzé	Falcons	1	15	6	0	53
2	Eric Zana	Boland Cavaliers	3	10	6	0	53
4	Gouws Prinsloo	Griquas	0	21	3	0	51
5	Carel Greeff	Griquas	10	0	0	0	50
6	Elric van Vuuren	SWD Eagles	1	4	8	0	37
7	Louis Strydom	Griffons	0	12	4	0	36
8	Gerrit Smith	SWD Eagles	2	6	3	0	31
9	Adri Jacobs	Leopards	6	0	0	0	30
10	Logan Basson	Border Bulldogs	0	1	8	0	26
11	Masixole Banda	Border Bulldogs	2	3	3	0	25
11	Kyle Hendricks	Falcons	5	0	0	0	25
11	Rhyno Smith	Leopards	4	1	0	1	25
14	Alvin Brandt	Griffons	4	0	0	0	20
14	Danwel Demas	Boland Cavaliers	4	0	0	0	20
14	Tertius Maarman	Griffons	4	0	0	0	20
14	Nicky Steyn	Griffons	4	0	0	0	20
18	Francois Brummer	Griquas	2	4	0	0	18
19	Adriaan Carelse	Boland Cavaliers	2	0	1	1	16
19	Franna du Toit	Griffons	0	2	4	0	16
21	AJ Coertzen	Griquas	3	0	0	0	15
21	Coert Cronjé	Falcons	3	0	0	0	15
21	Ntabeni Dukisa	Griquas	3	0	0	0	15
21	Damian Engledoe	Leopards	3	0	0	0	15
21	Johnathan Francke	Griquas	3	0	0	0	15
21	Vuyo Mbotho	Griffons	3	0	0	0	15
21	Loftus Morrison	Leopards	3	0	0	0	15
21	Joe Smith	Leopards	3	0	0	0	15
21	Adrian Vermeulen	Leopards	3	0	0	0	15
21	Riaan Viljoen	Griquas	3	0	0	0	15
31	Elgar Watts	Griffons	1	2	1	0	12
32	Martin Bezuidenhout	Griquas	2	0	0	0	10
32	Alshaun Bock	SWD Eagles	2	0	0	0	10
32	Christo du Plessis	SWD Eagles	2	0	0	0	10
32	Tyler Fisher	Leopards	2	0	0	0	10
32	Wian Fourie	Leopards	2	0	0	0	10
32	Grant Janke	Falcons	2	0	0	0	10
32	Jono Janse van Rensburg	Griquas	2	0	0	0	10
32	Wayne Khan	SWD Eagles	2	0	0	0	10
32	Hanno Kitshoff	Boland Cavaliers	2	0	0	0	10
32	Michael Makase	Border Bulldogs	2	0	0	0	10
32	Tian Meyer	Griquas	2	0	0	0	10
32	Friedle Olivier	Falcons	2	0	0	0	10
32	Jaco Oosthuizen	Falcons	2	0	0	0	10
32	Dillon Smit	Leopards	2	0	0	0	10
32	Clinton Swart	Griquas	2	0	0	0	10
32	Joe van der Hoogt	Griffons	2	0	0	0	10
32	Senan van der Merwe	Boland Cavaliers	2	0	0	0	10
32	Hanco Venter	Leopards	2	0	0	0	10
50	Christian Rust	Boland Cavaliers	1	2	0	0	9
51	Lukhanyo Am	Border Bulldogs	1	0	0	0	5
51	Yves Bashiya	Boland Cavaliers	1	0	0	0	5
51	Ludwe Booi	Border Bulldogs	1	0	0	0	5
51	Enver Brandt	Griffons	1	0	0	0	5
51	Rudi Britz	Griffons	1	0	0	0	5
51	Ashlon Davids	Leopards	1	0	0	0	5
51	Martin du Toit	SWD Eagles	1	0	0	0	5
51	Leighton Eksteen	SWD Eagles	1	0	0	0	5
51	Wilneth Engelbrecht	Boland Cavaliers	1	0	0	0	5
51	Arno Fortuin	Boland Cavaliers	1	0	0	0	5
51	Ntando Kebe	Border Bulldogs	1	0	0	0	5
51	Hugo Kloppers	Griquas	1	0	0	0	5
51	Stephan Kotzé	Griquas	1	0	0	0	5
51	Robert Kruger	Leopards	1	0	0	0	5
51	Ernst Ladendorf	Falcons	1	0	0	0	5
51	RJ Liebenberg	Griquas	1	0	0	0	5
51	Hilton Lobberts	Griquas	1	0	0	0	5
51	Makazole Mapimpi	Border Bulldogs	1	0	0	0	5
51	Sizo Maseko	Leopards	1	0	0	0	5
51	Japie Nel	Griffons	1	0	0	0	5
51	Norman Nelson	Griffons	1	0	0	0	5
51	Sipho Nofemele	Border Bulldogs	1	0	0	0	5
51	Arno Poley	Falcons	1	0	0	0	5
51	Anrich Richter	Falcons	1	0	0	0	5
51	Steph Roberts	Griquas	1	0	0	0	5
51	Janneman Stander	SWD Eagles	1	0	0	0	5
51	Johan Steyn	SWD Eagles	1	0	0	0	5
51	Sergio Torrens	Leopards	1	0	0	0	5
51	Michael van der Spuy	Griquas	1	0	0	0	5
51	Rudi van Rooyen	Griquas	1	0	0	0	5
51	Luzuko Vulindlu	SWD Eagles	1	0	0	0	5
51	Chaney Willemse	Boland Cavaliers	1	0	0	0	5
51	Marlyn Williams	Falcons	1	0	0	0	5
84	Oliver Zono	Border Bulldogs	0	2	0	0	4
85	Wynand Pienaar	Griffons	0	1	0	0	2
—	penalty try	Border Bulldogs	1	0	0	0	5
—	penalty try	Falcons	1	0	0	0	5
* Legend: T = Tries, C = Conversions, P = Penalties, DG = Drop Goals, Pts = Points.

=== Discipline ===
The following table contains all the cards handed out during the tournament:

Cards
Player	Team	Sent off (straight red)	Temporarily suspended
Dean Hopp	SWD Eagles	0	2
Yves Bashiya	Boland Cavaliers	0	1
Ashley Buys	SWD Eagles	0	1
Leighton Eksteen	SWD Eagles	0	1
Tyler Fisher	Leopards	0	1
Arno Fortuin	Boland Cavaliers	0	1
Hanno Kitshoff	Boland Cavaliers	0	1
Jaun Kotzé	Boland Cavaliers	0	1
Blake Kyd	Border Bulldogs	0	1
Clemen Lewis	Boland Cavaliers	0	1
Tian Meyer	Griquas	0	1
Buhle Mxunyelwa	Border Bulldogs	0	1
Andila Ntsila	SWD Eagles	0	1
Wandile Putuma	Border Bulldogs	0	1
Marno Redelinghuys	Leopards	0	1
Edwin Sass	Boland Cavaliers	0	1
Janneman Stander	SWD Eagles	0	1
* Legend: (red card) = Sent off, (yellow card) = Sin-binned

== Referees ==
The following referees officiated matches in the 2015 Currie Cup qualification series:

- Rodney Boneparte
- Ben Crouse
- Stephan Geldenhuys
- Quinton Immelman
- AJ Jacobs
- Pro Legoete
- Francois Pretorius
- Lourens van der Merwe
- Marius van der Westhuizen
- Jaco van Heerden

== See also ==
- 2015 Currie Cup Premier Division
- 2015 Currie Cup First Division
- 2015 Vodacom Cup
- 2015 Under-21 Provincial Championship Group A
- 2015 Under-21 Provincial Championship Group B
- 2015 Under-19 Provincial Championship Group A
- 2015 Under-19 Provincial Championship Group B
