= Roberto Santamaría =

Roberto Santamaría may refer to:

- Roberto Santamaría (footballer, born 1962)
- Roberto Santamaría (footballer, born 1985)
- Roberto Santamaria (rugby union)
