= Kitshoff =

Kitshoff is a surname. Notable people with the surname include:

- Hanno Kitshoff (born 1984), South African rugby union player
- Rohan Kitshoff (born 1985), Namibian rugby union player
- Steven Kitshoff (born 1992), South African rugby union player
