= Ross Jones =

Ross Jones may refer to:

- Ross Jones (baseball) (born 1960), American baseball shortstop
- Ross Jones (rugby league) (1917–1985), New Zealand rugby league player
- Ross Jones (rugby union) (born 1992), Welsh rugby union player
- Ross F. Jones (1900–1979), American politician, attorney general of Arizona

== See also ==
- Ross Clarke-Jones (born 1966), Australian surfer
- Ros Jones (born 1949), British politician
