= Alan Cotter =

Alan Cotter may refer to:

- Alan Cotter (rugby union)
- Alan Cotter (rowing)
