= Hanco Venter =

South African rugby union player

- Full name: Hanco Charles Venter
- Born: 7 January 1993 (age 33) Witbank
- Height: 1.76 m (5 ft 9 1/2 in)
- Weight: 82 kg (12 st 13 lb; 181 lb)
- School: Hoërskool Monument, Krugersdorp

Rugby union career
- Position: Scrum-half
Youth career
- 2006: Pumas
- 2010: Golden Lions
- 2012–2014: Sharks
Senior career
Years	Team	Apps	(Points)
2012–2017	Sharks XV	31	(25)
2014–2017	Sharks (Currie Cup)	6	(5)
2015	→ Leopards	7	(10)
- Correct as of 9 October 2016
International career
Years	Team	Apps	(Points)
2013	South Africa Under-20	3	(0)
- Correct as of 13 June 2013

Hanco Charles Venter is a South African rugby union player, who most recently played with the Sharks. His regular position is scrum-half.

== Career ==
=== Youth level ===
Born in Witbank, he first represented the Pumas at the 2006 Under–13 Craven Week. Four years later, he played for the Golden Lions at the 2010 Under–18 Craven Week before joining the Sharks.

=== Sharks ===
He made his provincial first class debut in the 28–18 victory over the Eastern Province Kings.

=== Leopards ===
He joined Potchefstroom-based side the Leopards during the 2015 Currie Cup qualification tournament that eventually went on to win the 2015 Currie Cup First Division. He featured in a total of seven matches during the 2015 Currie Cup qualification rounds and First Division proper and scored two tries for the side. However, he didn't feature in the team's title run-in, as they secured a 44–20 victory over the SWD Eagles to win the competition for the first time in their history.

=== S.A. Under-20 ===
He was included in the training group that toured Argentina in preparation for the 2013 IRB Junior World Championship. He was then included in the squad for the 2013 IRB Junior World Championship.
