= Jono Janse van Rensburg =

South African rugby union player

- Full name: Jonathan Barry Janse van Rensburg
- Born: 27 February 1989 (age 37) Pietermaritzburg, South Africa
- Height: 1.90 m (6 ft 3 in)
- Weight: 106 kg (16 st 10 lb; 234 lb)
- School: Maritzburg College, Pietermaritzburg
- University: Midlands Rugby Academy / University of South Africa / University of Pretoria

Rugby union career
- Position: Number eight
- Current team: Slava Moscow
Amateur team(s)
Years	Team	Apps	(Points)
2011–2014	UP Tuks	5	(0)
Senior career
Years	Team	Apps	(Points)
2012	Blue Bulls	0	(0)
2015–2019	Griquas	64	(45)
- Correct as of 8 July 2019

Jonathan Barry Janse van Rensburg (born 27 February 1989 in Pietermaritzburg, South Africa) is a South African rugby union player for Slava Moscow in the Russian Rugby Premier League. His regular position is number eight.

== Career ==
=== UP Tuks / Blue Bulls ===
Janse van Rensburg played rugby for Pretoria-based university side UP Tuks between 2011 and 2014.

He was also included in the Blue Bulls squad for the 2012 Currie Cup Premier Division competition, but failed to make any appearances for the Blue Bulls.

=== Griquas ===
In 2015, Janse van Rensburg moved to Kimberley to join Griquas. After being an unused substitute in their opening match of the 2015 Vodacom Cup season against the Eastern Province Kings in Port Elizabeth, he made his first class debut in their next match, a 19–12 victory over the SWD Eagles in George. He made his first senior start in their next match against the Border Bulldogs in Hartswater and also scored one try for Griquas during the season, in a 27–24 victory over a Sharks XV in Round Six of the competition. He helped Griquas finish second on the log to qualify for the quarter-finals, where they lost 14–28 to eventual champions the Pumas.

He made four appearances off the bench for Griquas in the 2015 Currie Cup qualification tournament, contributing two tries – one in a 48–17 win over the Boland Cavaliers and the other in a 57–33 win over the Falcons – to help Griquas finish top of the log to earn a place in the 2015 Currie Cup Premier Division competition.
