= CJ Stander =

South African-Irish rugby union player

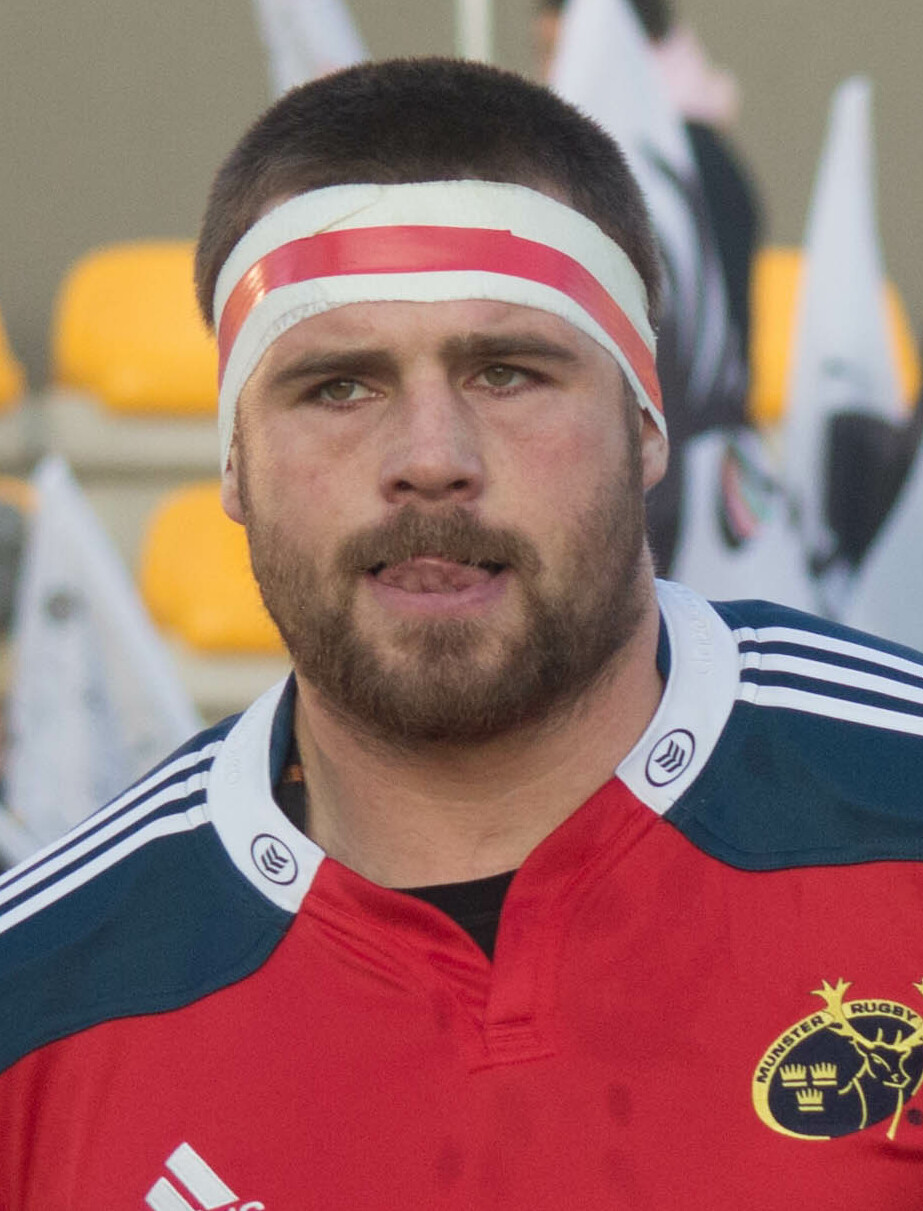
- Stander in 2015
- Born: Christiaan Johan Stander; 5 April 1990 (age 36) George, South Africa
- Height: 1.85 m (6 ft 1 in)
- Weight: 114 kg (18.0 st; 251 lb)
- School: Hoër Landbouskool Oakdale, Riversdale
- University: University of Pretoria
- Notable relative(s): Janneman Stander (brother); Ryk Neethling (brother-in-law)

Rugby union career
- Position(s): Number 8, Flanker
Amateur team(s)
Years	Team	Apps	(Points)
2012–2021	Shannon		
Senior career
Years	Team	Apps	(Points)
2010–2012	Blue Bulls	52	(75)
2012	Bulls	16	(20)
2012–2021	Munster	156	(210)
- Correct as of 28 May 2021
International career
Years	Team	Apps	(Points)
2008	South Africa U18	1	(0)
2009–2010	South Africa U20	10	(15)
2016–2021	Ireland	51	(60)
2017	British & Irish Lions	1	(0)
- Correct as of 20 March 2021

Christiaan Johan Stander (born 5 April 1990) is a South African-born Irish former rugby union player. Stander's career began in his native South Africa, where he played for the Blue Bulls in the Currie Cup between 2010 and 2012 and for the Bulls in Super Rugby in 2012. He moved to Irish province Munster in 2012 and, after qualifying via residency in 2015, made his debut for Ireland in 2016, going on to earn 51 caps for his adopted country, as well as 1 cap for the British & Irish Lions in 2017, before retiring in 2021.

== Early life ==
Stander was born in George, South Africa, where his family own a farm. Prior to focusing on rugby union, Stander was a champion discus thrower as a teenager. Stander's native language growing up was Afrikaans.

== Rugby union career ==
=== Youth rugby ===
Stander went to Blanco Primary School, where he began playing rugby union at the age of nine, playing as a fly-half. He then went to Hoër Landbouskool Oakdale (Oakdale Agricultural High School), where he shifted into the number eight position at the age of 14.

He earned provincial colours for three consecutive years, representing the SWD Eagles at youth tournaments. In 2006, he played for them at the Under-16 Grant Khomo Week held in Wellington, Western Cape. He started all three of their matches at the tournament, helping them to two victories and a draw.

Despite still being in the Under-17 age group in 2006, Stander was named captain of the SWD team for the premier high schools rugby union tournament in South Africa, the Under-18 Craven Week, held in Stellenbosch. He led from the front, scoring two tries against the Leopards, one try against KwaZulu-Natal and a hat-trick in their final match against the Griffons to finish as the tournament's top try scorer. His performances caught the attention of the national team selectors, and Stander was named in and appointed captain of the South Africa Schools Academy side, playing the full 80 minutes in a 15–50 defeat to the more senior South Africa Schools side.

Stander was again named captain of SWD for the 2008 Craven Week, which was held at Afrikaanse Hoër Seunskool in Pretoria. He helped them to a 26–21 victory over hosts the Blue Bulls in their first match, before scoring two tries in a 30–13 victory over the Pumas in their second match and one try in a 31–25 victory against the Free State in the main match of the tournament, as SWD was crowned the unofficial champions for the first time since 2001. At the conclusion of the tournament, Stander was named in the South Africa Schools squad, but ended on the wrong side of a shock result as the secondary Schools Academy side beat them 41–19 in a match played in Durban.

=== Bulls / Blue Bulls ===
==== 2009 ====
After high school, Stander moved to Pretoria to join the academy of Currie Cup side the Blue Bulls for the 2009 season onwards. Before he experienced any game-time in a Blue Bulls jersey, however, he was named in the South Africa Under-20 team to compete at the 2010 IRB Junior World Championship in Japan. He started all of their matches in the number eight jersey; he scored his country's first try of the tournament in a 36–10 victory against Fiji in the opening match, before helping them two further victories in Pool C, beating Italy 65–3 and France 43–27. Despite scoring his second try of the tournament in their semi-final match against England, he could not help them reach the final, losing the match 21–40. The team eventually finished third in the tournament, winning their final match of the tournament 32–5 against fellow beaten semi-finalists Australia.

He initially found himself fast-tracked into their Under-21 team, starting their first four matches in the Under-21 Provincial Championship, before then reverting to the Under-19 team. He scored two tries against Leopards U19 in his first match at that level, as he helped the team qualify for the semi-finals by winning all six of their matches to top the log. Despite making two further appearances for the Under-21s and scoring a try for them against the Leopards, he represented the Under-19s in the play-offs, but the team failed to get past their trans-Jukskei rivals the Golden Lions at the semi-final stage.

==== 2010 ====
At the start of 2010, Stander was included in the Blue Bulls squad for the 2010 Vodacom Cup, and – after being an unused replacement in the team's 27–22 victory over the Golden Lions XV – made his debut in their 50–7 victory over the Falcons in Kempton Park in Round Five of the competition, coming on in the 63rd minute of the match.

However, that turned out to be his only involvement in the competition, as he once again linked up with the South Africa Under-20 team, being named as captain for the team due to compete in the 2010 IRB Junior World Championship. For the second Junior World Championship in a row, Stander scored a try in South Africa's opening match, as they secured 40–14 win over Tonga in their first match. He captained them to a 73–0 victory over Scotland, before being involved in South Africa's first ever defeat in a pool match at the Junior World Championships, as they lost 35–42 to Australia. Despite the result, South Africa qualified for the semi-finals as the best pool runner-up, but lost again at that stage against eventual champions New Zealand. Stander started his fifth match of the competition in his side's 27–22 victory over England in the third-place play-off to emulate their 2009 finish.

Stander returned to domestic rugby union for the Blue Bulls by featuring in a compulsory friendly match against the Mighty Elephants. He was catapulted into their senior squad for the 2010 Currie Cup Premier Division and made his Currie Cup debut on 9 July 2010 – aged 20 years, 95 days – coming on as a replacement in their 38–15 victory over the Pumas. He made appearances off the bench in their next six matches before making his first Currie Cup start in a 39–38 victory over Griquas in their Round Seven match. He made a further four starts and two appearances as a replacement, but with players like Danie Rossouw returning from international duty, dropped back into the Blue Bulls U21 team. He made one start for them during the Under-21 Provincial Championship regular season, scoring a try in their 41–36 victory over Leopards U21. The team finished second on the log to qualify for the semi-finals, and Stander started both their 39–35 victory over the Sharks U21s in the semi-final and the final, which Stander's team lost 32–43 to Western Province U21.

==== 2011 ====
After his single appearance in the Vodacom Cup in 2010, Stander saw more action in that competition in 2011. He took part in all of the Blue Bulls' eleven matches in the competition, making six starts and coming on as a replacement in the other five. He started off the season by scoring a try in their opening match against a Sharks XV, but failed to get on the scoreboard again for the remainder of the regular season, as the Blue Bulls won just three of their eight matches, but still finished in fourth place in the Northern Section to secure the final quarter final place. He started their quarter final match, which ended in a 28–26 victory over the Golden Lions, and appeared as a replacement in against Griquas in the semi-final, scoring his team's final try in a 47–34 win. He played in the final against the Pampas XV, but could not prevent the Argentine invitational side from winning 14–9 to be crowned champions for the first time.

Stander again featured in a compulsory friendly match prior to the 2011 Currie Cup, scoring two tries in a 50–19 victory over the Griffons in Welkom. After playing off the bench in their first three matches of the Currie Cup season, he then made the number eight jersey his own, being named in the run-on side for all of their remaining matches. He contributed six tries to the team's cause – against the Leopards in Potchefstroom, against the Sharks, Western Province, the Pumas and two tries in their final match of the regular season, a 92–21 victory over the Leopards in Pretoria. However, the Blue Bulls endured a poor season and failed to qualify for the semi-finals, finishing in fifth spot on the log. With Stander only 21, he dropped to Under-21 and started for them in their two play-off matches in the Under-21 Provincial Championship; he scored a try in a 47–18 victory over the Golden Lions U21s in the semi-finals, and a second in a 46–30 victory over the Sharks U21s in the final, to secure his first silverware since joining the Blue Bulls.

==== 2012 ====
At the start of 2012, Stander was included in the Bulls squad for the first time; they are the Super Rugby franchise affiliated to the Blue Bulls provincial team. He made his Super Rugby debut on 24 February 2012 in an 18–13 victory in their opening match of the season against the Sharks. After a second appearance off the bench against the Cheetahs a week later, Stander made his first start in the competition in a home defeat to New Zealand side the Blues. With Dewald Potgieter and Deon Stegmann missing the majority of the season through injury, Stander firmly established himself in the side and started a further ten matches in a row. He scored his first Super Rugby try in his second start, a 61–8 victory over Australian side the Reds and further tries against the Lions, Brumbies and Rebels. With the Bulls' first-choice flankers all returning from injury for the final three matches of the regular season, Stander dropped to the bench for those matches, as the Bulls secured a place in the play-offs by finishing fifth overall. He dropped out of the matchday squad altogether for their qualifier match against the Crusaders, where a 13–28 defeat ended the Bulls' interest in the competition.

Despite a call-up to train with the South Africa national team as they prepared for the 2012 Rugby Championship, Stander was not included in their final squad and instead continued to represent the Blue Bulls in the Currie Cup. Although his move to Munster was already announced, Stander still featured in all eleven of their matches in the competition. He scored two tries in his first start in the competition against the Free State Cheetahs, and more tries against the Sharks, Griquas and their return match against the Free State Cheetahs. The team finished in fourth place on the log and Stander's final match in a Blue Bulls jersey was their 3–20 defeat to the Sharks in the semi-finals.

=== Munster ===
==== 2012–13 ====
In June 2012, Stander signed a deal to join Irish province Munster on a two-year contract at the end of the 2012 Currie Cup Premier Division season. He later revealed that one of the reasons for his move was that he was considered to be too small to be a South Africa international. Left with the options of leaving the country or switching to hooker, Stander recalls "I just made the decision easy and said, 'Well boys, I'll pack up my stuff and leave'. Munster signed me and they didn't think I was too small." As Munster could not sign any more internationally capped players, he was signed as a project player. This meant that Stander would be eligible to play for Ireland under World Rugby residency laws if he stayed with Munster for three years. He arrived in Ireland to join up with the Munster squad on 30 October 2012.

Five days after arriving in Ireland, Stander went on a night out in Cork with his new teammates, but ended up almost sleeping on the streets after ending up alone outside of a bar. Stander, with very limited English, was denied entry by the doorman and, not knowing any of his teammates phone numbers and very little money on his person, found himself lost. Fortunately, Stander recalled that one of his new teammates, Barry O'Mahony lived near the a guide dogs facility in Cork, and was able to get a taxi to his home.

Stander made his debut for Munster on 25 November 2012, coming on as a replacement in the Pro12 fixture against Scarlets. He made his first start for Munster against Glasgow Warriors in Thomond Park on 1 December 2012, scoring two tries in a Man-of-the-Match winning performance. Stander was ruled out for a month after breaking a bone in his hand during the Glasgow game. He made his comeback from the injury on 5 January 2013, in a Pro12 game against Cardiff Blues in Musgrave Park.

As he was ineligible to represent Munster in the Heineken Cup, Stander instead turned out for Munster A in the British and Irish Cup, playing at Number 8 against Aberavon and Plymouth Albion, scoring a try against the latter. Stander scored his third try in just four appearances for Munster on 9 February 2013, when he made his second start for the club against Edinburgh. Stander revealed in 2020 that he arrived at Munster unable to speak English, and it was two or three years before he was confident enough to speak up during training or meetings.

==== 2013–14 ====
Stander scored his first try in his second season at Munster during an uncapped pre-season friendly against Gloucester on 24 August 2013. He scored two tries in his first full appearance of the season, against Zebre, on 13 September 2013. Stander made his Heineken Cup debut on 12 October 2013, coming off the bench against Edinburgh in Munster's opening pool game. He came off the bench against Gloucester during Munster's 26–10 victory on 19 October 2013. Stander was also a replacement during Munster's 36–8 win against Perpignan on 8 December 2013. He came off the bench in the 20–7 away win against Gloucester on 11 January 2013, a win that secured quarter-final qualification.

In January 2014, Stander signed a new two-year contract with Munster. Stander scored his seventh try for Munster in a Pro14 fixture against Cardiff Blues on 8 February 2014. He came on as a replacement after 18 minutes for injured captain Peter O'Mahony in Munster's Heineken Cup quarter-final against Toulouse on 5 April 2014, scoring his first Heineken Cup try in the 47–23 win and earning the Man-of-the-Match award. Stander started in Munster's 24–16 semi-final defeat to Toulon on 27 April 2014.

==== 2014–15 ====
Stander scored two tries in Munster's 14–13 defeat against Edinburgh in their opening Pro12 game on 5 September 2014. He also scored a try in Munster's win against Benetton on 12 September 2014. Stander started in Munster's first 2014–15 European Rugby Champions Cup game against Sale Sharks on 18 October 2014, earning the Man-of-the-Match award in the 27–26 away win. He started against Saracens in Round 2 of the Champions Cup on 24 October 2014. Stander started the Round 3 game against Clermont Auvergne on 6 December 2014. He also started in the reverse fixture against Clermont on 14 December 2014. Stander scored a try and won the Man-of-the-Match award in Munster's 28–13 win against Leinster on 26 December 2014. He also scored a try in the 31–7 away win against Zebre on 10 January 2015, again winning the Man-of-the-Match award.

Stander started against Saracens on 17 January 2015, but went off with an injured ankle in the first-half. The injury ruled Stander out for 4 to 6 weeks. He returned from the injury on 21 February 2015, starting in the game against Scarlets. Stander scored a try in Munster's 22–10 win against Glasgow Warriors on 28 February 2015. He won his fifth Man-of-the-Match award of the season in Munster's 42–20 win against Connacht on 28 March 2015. Stander scored a try in Munster's 34–3 win against Edinburgh on 11 April 2015.

He won the 2015 Munster Rugby Senior Player of the Year Award in April 2015, becoming the first overseas player to do so. He scored a try in the 30–19 win against Treviso on 25 April 2015. Stander won the Man-of-the-Match award in Munster's 23–23 draw against Ulster on 9 May 2015. He was named in the 2014–15 Pro12 Dream Team, alongside teammate Tommy O'Donnell. He scored a try in Munster's 50–27 win against Dragons on 16 May 2015. Stander was named Man-of-the-Match in Munster's 21–18 play-off semi-final win against Ospreys on 23 May 2015. He started in the 2015 Pro12 Grand Final against Glasgow Warriors on 30 May 2015.

==== 2015–16 ====
Stander captained Munster in their opening fixture of the 2015–16 Pro12 against Benetton on 5 September 2015, scoring two tries and earning the Man-of-the-Match award in the 18–13 win for Munster. He came off the bench against Ospreys on 13 September 2015, scoring a try that leveled the scores and allowed Ian Keatley to kick the conversion that won the match for Munster. On 30 October 2015, Stander captained Munster in their 32–38 win against provincial rivals Ulster. On 4 November 2015, it was announced that, in the absence of regular captain Peter O'Mahony, Stander would captain Munster during the pool stage of the 2015–16 European Rugby Champions Cup. He started the opening pool game of the tournament against Benetton on 14 November 2015, scoring a try and earning the Man-of-the-Match award in Munster's 32–7 win.

In December 2015, Stander signed a two-year contract extension with Munster, which will see him remain with the province until at least June 2018. Stander started against Leicester Tigers in the Champions Cup on 12 December 2015. On 16 January 2016, Stander scored a try and won the Man-of-the-Match award in Munster's 26–13 win against Stade Français. On 25 March 2016, immediately after returning from international duty with Ireland, Stander scored a try in Munster's 47–0 win against Zebre.

In May 2016, Stander won the Rugby Players Ireland Players' Player of the Year Award, just the third overseas player to do so. He also won the Irish Times-sponsored Supporters' Player of the Year Award, becoming the first overseas winner of the award and the first player to win both the Players' and Supporters' awards in the same season. On 7 May 2016, Stander scored a try and won the Man-of-the-Match award in Munster's 31–15 win against Scarlets, a win which secured Champions Cup rugby for the following season. Stander was named in the 2015–16 Pro12 Dream Team, the second consecutive season he has achieved the accolade. In May 2016, Stander was named the Munster Player of the Year, becoming the first player to win the award in successive seasons. During the season, Stander won a total of four Man-of-the-Match awards, scored seven tries and captained Munster in 18 games.

==== 2016–17 ====
On 1 October 2016, Stander scored two tries in Munster's 49–5 win against Zebre in a 2016–17 Pro12 fixture. In Munster's game against Glasgow Warriors on 22 October 2016, their first since the sudden death of then-Head Coach Anthony Foley on 16 October, the number 8 jersey was retired for the occasion, as a tribute to Foley, and Stander wore the number 24 instead. After the game, which Munster won 38–16, Stander brought Foley's sons, Tony and Dan, onto the Thomond Park pitch and, with the rest of the Munster squad and staff, as well as the crowd, they sang Stand Up And Fight.

On 29 November 2016, Stander was named the Guinness Rugby Writers of Ireland Player of the Year at an event in Dublin. On 10 December 2016, Stander was Man-of-the-Match in Munster's 38–0 win against Leicester Tigers in Round 3 of the 2016–17 European Rugby Champions Cup. On 7 January 2017, Stander scored a try and won the Man-of-the-Match award in Munster's 32–7 away win against Racing 92. On 21 January 2017, Stander won the Man-of-the-Match award in Munster's 22–10 win against Racing 92, a victory which secured a home quarter-final for Munster in the Champions Cup. On 1 April 2017, Stander scored a try in Munster's 41–16 Champions Cup quarter-final win against Toulouse, though he left the field injured during the second half.

On 22 April 2017, Stander made his return from the ankle injury sustained during Munster's quarter-final, starting in the semi-final against defending champions Saracens and scoring a try, though it wasn't enough to stop the English side from winning 26–10 in the Aviva Stadium. In April 2017, Stander was shortlisted for European Player of the Year. On 27 May 2017, Stander started for Munster against Welsh side Scarlets in the 2017 Pro12 Grand Final.

==== 2017–18 ====
In Munster's 2017–18 Pro14 match against Leinster on 7 October 2017, Stander earned his 100th cap for the province. He scored Munster's only try in their 25–16 away win against Leicester Tigers in the 2017–18 European Rugby Champions Cup on 17 December 2017. Stander signed a new three-year contract with the IRFU in December 2017, a deal that will see him remain with Munster until at least June 2021. Stander captained Munster in their 39–22 away win against Southern Kings on 7 April 2018, scoring a try in the match that was played in Outeniqua Park in his hometown of George.

==== 2018–19 ====
Stander scored Munster's second try in their 30–22 defeat at the hands of Leinster in round 6 of the 2018–19 Pro14 on 6 October 2018. One week later, Stander scored Munster's only try in their 10–10 draw against Exeter Chiefs in Sandy Park during the sides' opening 2018–19 Champions Cup pool 2 fixture. He captained Munster in their 26–17 win against Leinster on 29 December 2018. Stander captained Munster and won the Man-of-the-Match award in their 31–12 win against Zebre on 23 March 2019.

==== 2019–20 ====
Stander was Man-of-the-Match in Munster's 10–3 win against Saracens in round 3 of the 2019–20 Champions Cup, and he captained Munster in their 15–6 defeat in the reverse fixture one week later after regular captain Peter O'Mahony withdrew before kick-off due to injury, also retaining the captaincy in Munster's 19–14 away win against provincial rivals Connacht in round 8 of the 2019–20 Pro14 on 21 December 2019. He scored two tries in Munster's 33–6 win against Ospreys in their final pool game of the 2019–20 Champions Cup on 19 January 2020. Stander won the Player of the Year award for Munster for a record third time is six years, having previously won it during the 2014–15 and 2015–16 seasons.

==== 2020–21 ====
Stander captained Munster and scored a try in the province's 25–23 away win against Edinburgh in round two of the 2020–21 Pro14 on 10 October 2020. He scored a try and won the Star-of-the-Match award in Munster's historic comeback 39–31 away win against French side Clermont in round two of the 2020–21 Champions Cup on 19 December 2020, and earned his 150th cap for Munster in their 13–10 home defeat against Leinster in round 9 of the Pro14 on 23 January 2021.

In a shock announcement in March 2021, Stander confirmed that he would retire from professional rugby at the end of the 2020–21 season, citing family reasons and a desire to retire from the game whilst playing his best rugby. Munster forwards coach Graham Rowntree spoke of his shock at Stander's announcement, whilst also praising Stander, and Stander's provincial and international teammate Peter O'Mahony also paid tribute to Stander.

Stander started for Munster in the 2021 Pro14 Grand Final against Leinster on 27 March 2021, in what was his final league appearance for the province. There was to be no fairy tale ending though, as Munster lost 16–6 to their rivals. In his 50th Champions Cup appearance, Stander captained Munster in the absence of the injured Peter O'Mahony in their 40–33 home defeat against French club Toulouse in the last 16 of the tournament on 3 April 2021, bringing to an end Munster's 2020–21 and Stander's final European campaign.

Jake White, head coach of the Bulls, where Stander began his professional career, tried to persuade Stander to come out of retirement for another season with the Bulls once he'd returned to South Africa; Stander, though flattered by the offer, declined, reiterating that his decision to retire was based on wanting to be near his family.

In his final game for the province in Thomond Park, Stander captained Munster to a 31–27 win against Cardiff Blues in round 4 of the Pro14 Rainbow Cup on 28 May 2021. Superficial burns sustained during a fire pit incident caused Stander to be ruled out of Munster's final game of the 2020–21 season, away to Italian side Zebre, bringing to an end Stander's career with Munster.

=== Ireland ===
In May 2015, Stander, who qualified for Ireland by residency on the day after the 2015 Rugby World Cup Final, told Pro12's official website, "I will have to decide [between South Africa and Ireland] but I think I have set my sights on Ireland and I think that is what I'm going to pursue."

In January 2016, Stander was called up to Ireland's training squad for the 2016 Six Nations Championship. On 20 January 2016, Stander was named in Ireland's 35-man squad for the 2016 Six Nations. On 7 February 2016, Stander made his debut for Ireland, starting against Wales in their opening match of the Six Nations and earning the Man-of-the-Match award in 16–16 draw. On 13 February 2016, Stander started against France in Ireland's second game of the Six Nations. On 12 March 2016, Stander scored his first try for Ireland in their 58–15 win against Italy.

On 25 May 2016, Stander was named in the 32-man Ireland squad to tour his native South Africa in a 3-test series. On 11 June 2016, Stander started in the first test against South Africa. He was sent off during the first half for a late hit on Patrick Lambie, the first red card of his career. In the subsequent disciplinary hearing, Stander was banned for one week. On 26 October 2016, Stander was named in Ireland's squad for the 2016 end-of-year rugby union internationals. On 5 November 2016, Stander started in Ireland's test against New Zealand at Soldier Field, Chicago, scoring a try in a 40–29 win that was Ireland's first ever against the All Blacks.

On 23 January 2017, Stander was named in the Ireland squad for the opening two rounds of the 2017 Six Nations Championship. On 11 February 2017, Stander scored a hat-trick of tries in Ireland's 63–10 win against Italy in the Stadio Olimpico, Rome, earning the Man-of-the-Match award. This was the first hat-trick scored by an Irish back-row since Brian Robinson's against Zimbabwe at the 1991 Rugby World Cup. It was also the first hat-trick scored by an Ireland player in the Six Nations since Brian O'Driscoll's against Scotland in the 2002 tournament. Furthermore, it was the first hat-trick scored by a forward in Six Nations Championship history and the first by a forward since Frenchman Michel Crauste's in the 1962 Five Nations Championship. Stander's teammate, Craig Gilroy, also scored a hat-trick in the match, making Ireland the first team since England in 1914 to have two hat-trick scorers in a Five or Six Nations game. On 18 March 2017, Stander made a late switch to Number 8 for Ireland when Jamie Heaslip pulled out of the game against England during the warm-up. Ireland went on to win the game in the Aviva Stadium 13–9 and, in doing so, denied England consecutive Grand Slams in the Six Nations. Following his performances in the tournament, Stander was nominated for the 2017 RBS 6 Nations Player of the Championship award, alongside teammate Conor Murray.

He started in Ireland's wins against South Africa and Argentina during the 2017 Autumn Internationals, whilst also featuring off the bench in the win against Fiji. Stander started four games for Ireland as they won a Grand Slam in the 2018 Six Nations Championship, featuring off the bench against Italy and scoring a try against England. His try against England was nominated for the Volkswagen-sponsored Try of the Year when the 2018 Rugby Players Ireland Awards nominees were announced in April 2018. Stander started in all three tests in Ireland's historic 2–1 series victory against Australia in June 2018, scoring Ireland's only try and earning the Man-of-the-Match award in their 20–16 third test win. During the 2018 Autumn Tests, Stander started in Ireland's 28–17 win against Argentina on 10 November, and in their 16–9 win against New Zealand on 17 November, a victory that was Ireland's first ever in Dublin against New Zealand.

Stander started in Irelands' 32–20 home defeat against England in the opening round of the 2019 Six Nations Championship on 3 February 2019, though he went off injured during the game. He returned from the injury to start in Ireland's 26–14 win against France on 10 March 2019 and their 25–7 defeat at the hands of Wales on 16 March 2019, a victory that secured a grand slam for the Welsh.

He was selected in the 31-man Ireland squad for the 2019 Rugby World Cup, having featured in the warm-up match against England and the second fixture against Wales. He started in Ireland's 27–3 win against Scotland in their opening Rugby World Cup pool A fixture on 22 September 2019, as well as their shock 19–12 defeat against hosts Japan in the second pool game, before featuring off the bench in Ireland's 35–0 win against Russia and starting and scoring a try in Ireland 47–5 win against Samoa in their final pool game, a victory that secured Ireland's place in the last eight of the tournament. Stander started in the comprehensive 46–14 quarter-final defeat against New Zealand on 19 October 2019.

Retained by new head coach Andy Farrell in his squad for the 2020 Six Nations Championship, Stander started in Ireland's 19–12 opening win against Scotland on 1 February 2020, their 24–14 win against defending champions Wales on 8 February, and their 24–12 defeat against England, before the tournament was suspended due to the COVID-19 pandemic. The tournament eventually resumed in October 2020, with Stander starting and scoring a try in Ireland's 50–17 win against Italy and starting in the 35–27 defeat against France in their final fixture of the tournament. Stander was nominated for the 2020 Six Nations Player of the Championship.

With the usual format of end-of-year international tests not possible due to the COVID-19 pandemic, Ireland instead participated in the Autumn Nations Cup. Stander started in the 18–7 defeat against England on 21 November 2020, the 23–10 win against Georgia on 29 November, and the 31–16 win against Scotland on 5 December, which secured a third-place finish for Ireland in the tournament.

Stander started for Ireland in their 21–16 away defeat against Wales in their opening fixture of the 2021 Six Nations Championship on 7 February 2021, also starting in the 15–13 home defeat against France and the 48–10 away win against Italy, in which Stander scored a try, Stander won his 50th cap for Ireland in their fixture against Scotland on 14 March 2021, leading the side out in their 27–24 away win.

Two days after winning his 50th cap for Ireland, Stander made a shock announcement that he would be retiring from rugby union at the end of the 2020–21 season, citing a desire to raise his young daughter around his family in South Africa, to leave the game whilst still in good form, and to reduce the burden placed on his young family by a professional rugby players career. Ireland captain Johnny Sexton expressed his surprise at Stander's decision, whilst also heaping praise on his international teammate.

Following the announcement, many media outlets were quick to praise Stander for his decision and for his impact on Irish rugby union. His 51st and final cap for Ireland was their 32–18 win against England in the final round of the 2021 Six Nations on 20 March 2021. In a post-match interview, an emotional Stander thanked supporters and staff and remarked that "dreams do come true". In his final Six Nations campaign, Stander was named in the Team of the Championship.

=== British & Irish Lions ===
Stander was selected in Warren Gatland's 41-man squad for the 2017 British & Irish Lions tour to New Zealand when it was announced in April 2017. On 7 June, Stander made his non-test debut for the Lions when he started at Number 8 against the Blues in Eden Park, scoring the Lions only try in their 22–16 defeat. On 10 June, Stander made his second appearance of the tour when he replaced Ireland teammate Seán O'Brien in the match against Crusaders in AMI Stadium. On 13 June, Stander made his third appearance of the tour, starting at Number 8 against the Highlanders in Forsyth Barr Stadium. On 20 June, Stander started for the Lions in their 34–5 win against the Chiefs in Waikato Stadium. On 27 June, in the final mid-week fixture, Stander started against the then-defending Super Rugby champions Hurricanes in Westpac Stadium. Having been an unused replacement during the second test a week earlier, Stander made his test debut for the Lions on 8 July when he was a half-time substitute for his injured Ireland teammate Seán O'Brien during the third test against New Zealand in Eden Park. The 15–15 draw meant the series itself was a draw.

== Personal life ==
Stander is married to Jean-Marié Neethling, the sister of South African olympic gold medalist Ryk Neethling. Their daughter, Everli, was born in Ireland, in August 2019. His brother, Janneman Stander, is a rugby union player in South Africa for the SWD Eagles. In May 2017, the Mayor of Limerick, Kieran O'Hanlon, made Stander the city's inaugural honorary international ambassador. He was also named an honorary Limerick man at the Limerick Person of the Year awards in April 2021, and appeared on The Late Late Show in May 2021, discussing in particular the famous figure of 8 that the Ireland players formed in tribute to Anthony Foley ahead of their historic first ever win against New Zealand in 2016, and the support he received from the vast majority of the public when faced with criticism of being a South African playing for Ireland.

After retiring, Stander and his family returned to South Africa and settled in the town of Paarl in the Western Cape, where he works as a project controller for construction company Val de Vie Construction, who are responsible for the Val de Vie Estate.

== Statistics ==
=== International analysis by opposition ===
Against	Played	Won	Lost	Drawn	Tries	Points	% Won
Argentina	2	2	0	0	1	5	100
Australia	4	3	1	0	1	5	75
England	8	3	5	0	1	5	37.5
Fiji	1	1	0	0	0	0	100
France	6	3	3	0	0	0	50
Georgia	1	1	0	0	0	0	100
Italy	5	5	0	0	6	30	100
Japan	1	0	1	0	0	0	0
New Zealand*	5	2	2	1	1	5	40
Russia	1	1	0	0	0	0	100
Samoa	1	1	0	0	1	5	100
Scotland	7	6	1	0	1	5	85.71
South Africa	3	2	1	0	0	0	66.67
Wales	7	3	3	1	0	0	42.86
Total	52	33	17	2	12	60	63.46

* indicates inclusion of caps for British & Irish Lions

=== International tries ===
Try	Opposing team	Location	Venue	Competition	Date	Result
1	Italy	Dublin	Aviva Stadium	2016 Six Nations	12 March 2016	Won
2	Scotland	Dublin	Aviva Stadium	2016 Six Nations	19 March 2016	Won
3	New Zealand	Chicago	Soldier Field	2016 November Tests	5 November 2016	Won
4, 5, 6	Italy	Rome	Stadio Olimpico	2017 Six Nations	11 February 2017	Won
7	Argentina	Dublin	Aviva Stadium	2017 November Tests	25 November 2017	Won
8	England	London	Twickenham	2018 Six Nations	17 March 2018	Won
9	Australia	Sydney	Allianz Stadium	2018 Ireland tour	23 June 2018	Won
10	Samoa	Fukuoka	Fukuoka Hakatanomori Stadium	2019 Rugby World Cup	12 October 2019	Won
11	Italy	Dublin	Aviva Stadium	2020 Six Nations	24 October 2020	Won
12	Italy	Rome	Stadio Olimpico	2021 Six Nations	27 February 2021	Won

Correct as of 20 March 2021

== Honours ==
=== Ireland ===
- Six Nations Championship:
  - Winner (1): 2018
- Grand Slam:
  - Winner (1): 2018
- Triple Crown:
  - Winner (1): 2018

=== Individual ===
- Munster Rugby Men's Player of the Year:
  - Winner (3): 2014–15, 2015–16, 2019–20
- Ireland Men's Players' Player of the Year:
  - Winner (1): 2015–16
- Ireland Men's Supporters Player of the Year:
  - Winner (1): 2015–16

== See also ==
- List of Six Nations Championship hat-tricks
