= Yves Bashiya =

- Full name: Yves Mulengi Tshiumbi Bashiya
- Born: 13 February 1987 (age 39) Kinshasa, Zaire
- Height: 1.85 m (6 ft 1 in)
- Weight: 107 kg (236 lb; 16 st 12 lb)
- School: Capricorn High School, Polokwane

Rugby union career
- Position: Flanker / Lock
Youth career
- 2004–2005: Limpopo Blue Bulls
- 2006: Blue Bulls
- 2007: Pumas
Amateur team(s)
Years	Team	Apps	(Points)
2012	TUT Vikings	7	(0)
2014	Centurion	7	(10)
Senior career
Years	Team	Apps	(Points)
2009	Falcons	14	(10)
2009–2010	Mighty Elephants	12	(5)
2010	EP Invitational XV	1	(0)
2010	Falcons	2	(0)
2014–2017	Boland Cavaliers	35	(5)
- Correct as of 28 May 2018

Yves Mulengi Tshiumbi Bashiya (born 13 February 1987) is a professional rugby union player based in South Africa, who most recently played with the Boland Cavaliers. His regular position is flanker or lock.

== Career ==
=== Youth ===
Despite being born in Zaire, Bashiya grew up in Pietersburg in South Africa's Limpopo province. In 2004 and 2005, he represented the Limpopo Blue Bulls side at the Under-18 Craven Week tournaments. In 2006, he joined Limpopo's parent union, the Blue Bulls and he played for their Under-19 side in the Provincial Championship. The following year, he was part of the Pumas U21 squad that played in the 2007 Under-21 Provincial Championship.

=== Falcons ===
Bashiya made his first class debut during the 2009 Vodacom Cup competition, where he represented the East Rand side, the Falcons. He started in their opening match of the competition, away to Griquas in Kimberley in a 65–12 defeat. He eventually made a total of five appearances in the competition. In June 2009, he played in a compulsory friendly match for the Falcons against Griquas prior to the 2009 Currie Cup First Division season, scoring a try in a 67–20 defeat. He was then included in the squad for the competition proper and made his Currie Cup debut by playing off the bench against the Griffons in Kempton Park. He made four substitute appearances and started their matches against the Border Bulldogs (also scoring his first Currie Cup try in that match) and the return match against the Griffons.

=== Eastern Province Mighty Elephants ===
However, midway through the 2009 Currie Cup First Division, Bashiya left the Falcons to join Port Elizabeth-based side the Mighty Elephants. Just a week after playing his last match for the Falcons against the Griffons, he made his debut for the Mighty Elephants against the same opposition His first start for the Mighty Elephants came in their next match against the Pumas. He made a total of five appearances for the Mighty Elephants during the competition and also played in all seven their matches during the 2010 Vodacom Cup competition, also scoring his first try for the side against Western Province.

=== Return to Falcons ===
After just under a year in Port Elizabeth, Bashiya left after new coach Alan Solomons deemed his services surplus to requirements and he returned to former side the Falcons during the 2010 Currie Cup First Division competition. However, he only played in two matches for the Falcons – against the Griffons and the Border Bulldogs.

=== Club rugby ===
Bashiya then dropped down to club rugby. He played for the TUT Vikings in the 2012 Varsity Cup competition, making seven appearances in the competition, and played in the Blue Bulls Carlton League with TUT and with Centurion. In 2013, Centurion finished second in the Carlton League to qualify to the 2014 SARU Community Cup. Bashiya made seven appearances in this competition and scored two tries in three matches at the finals, against Despatch and Old Selbornians.

=== Boland Cavaliers ===
Bashiya's performances in the 2014 SARU Community Cup earned him another chance at playing provincial rugby, as he joined Wellington-based side Boland Cavaliers for the 2014 Currie Cup qualification tournament. He made his debut for them in their match against the Griffons.
