= Buhle Mxunyelwa =

South African rugby union player

- Born: 25 June 1986 (age 40) East London, South Africa
- Height: 1.87 m (6 ft 1 1/2 in)
- Weight: 122 kg (19 st 3 lb; 269 lb)
- School: Stirling High School, East London
- University: University of Fort Hare / Stellenbosch University

Rugby union career
- Position: Prop
- Current team: Border Bulldogs
Youth career
- 2005–2007: Border Bulldogs
Amateur team(s)
Years	Team	Apps	(Points)
2010	Maties	13	(0)
2013	Rustenburg Impala	3	(0)
2013–2014	Wanderers		
Senior career
Years	Team	Apps	(Points)
2008–2009	Border Bulldogs	19	(10)
2008	East Cape XV	1	(0)
2010	Western Province	8	(0)
2011–2012	Leopards	6	(0)
2013	Leopards XV	3	(0)
2014–present	Border Bulldogs	24	(0)
- Correct as of 22 July 2016

Buhle "Bush" Mxunyelwa (born 25 June 1986) is a South African professional rugby union player currently playing with the Border Bulldogs. His regular position is tighthead prop.

== Career ==
=== Youth ===
Mxunyelwa played for the Border U21 side in the 2005, 2006 and 2007 Under-21 Provincial Championships.

=== Border Bulldogs ===
Mxunyelwa made his senior debut during the 2008 Vodacom Cup season, coming on as a substitute in their 5–15 opening day defeat to Griquas. The following week, he was promoted to the starting line-up for their match against the Griffons in Welkom. He made a total of seven appearances during the competition and also broke into their Currie Cup side for the 2008 Currie Cup First Division competition. His Currie Cup debut came against the Griffons in East London and he made a total of seven appearances in the competition, including one start against the SWD Eagles.

Mxunyelwa made a further five appearances during the 2009 Vodacom Cup competition – scoring his first senior try in the Bulldogs' match against the Boland Cavaliers in Wellington, Western Cape – and, after playing for an East Cape XV in a compulsory friendly match against the Blue Bulls, played in all ten matches of the Border Bulldogs' 2009 Currie Cup First Division season, starting nine of them.

=== Western Province / Maties ===
In 2010, Mxunyelwa moved to the Western Cape. He played in six of the Maties matches during the 2010 Varsity Cup competition, helping them win the competition for the third year in a row, but not being involved in the latter stages of the competition. Instead, he represented Western Province in the 2010 Vodacom Cup competition, starting in six of their matches.

Mxunyelwa was also included in Western Province's squad for the 2010 Currie Cup Premier Division season. He made two appearances; his first appearance in the Premier Division of the Currie Cup came during their match against Griquas in Kimberley and he also played in their match against the Sharks in Durban.

Mxunyelwa started in six of the Maties' seven matches during the 2011 Varsity Cup, but failed to feature for Western Province at provincial level.

=== Leopards ===
Mxunyelwa moved to Potchefstroom to join the Leopards prior to the 2011 Currie Cup Premier Division season. He made his debut for the Leopards during their match against the Blue Bulls in what would turn out to be his only Currie Cup appearance for the Leopards. He made a total of eight appearances for them during the 2012 and 2013 Vodacom Cup competitions and also represented club side Rustenburg Impala in the 2013 SARU Community Cup competition, making three appearances.

=== Ireland ===
Mxunyelwa then went to Ireland, where he played for Dublin-based AIL side Wanderers during the 2013–2014 season.

=== Return to Border Bulldogs ===
Mxunyelwa returned to South Africa in 2014 and rejoined former side Border Bulldogs for the 2014 Currie Cup qualification campaign. He was immediately involved, starting their first match of the tournament, a 52–5 loss to Griquas.
