= Royce Burke-Flynn =

Irish rugby union player

- Born: Royce Burke-Flynn; 19 January 1987 (age 39) Dublin, Ireland
- Height: 1.91 m (6 ft 3 in)
- Weight: 117 kg (18 st 6 lb; 258 lb)
- School: St Michael's College

Rugby union career
- Position: Tighthead Prop
Amateur team(s)
Years	Team	Apps	(Points)
- Clontarf
Senior career
Years	Team	Apps	(Points)
2015-17	Leinster	1	(0)
- Correct as of 4 September 2015
- Correct as of 9 April 2015

Royce Burke-Flynn (born 19 January 1987) is an Irish rugby union player. He previously played for Leinster Rugby. His preferred position is prop. It was announced in April 2015 that he had been awarded a senior contract with Leinster and having previously played with Leinster 'A'.
