= Christy Condon =

Irish former rugby union player

- Born: 23 October 1981 (age 45) Cork, Ireland
- Height: 1.75 m (5 ft 9 in)
- Weight: 117 kg (18.4 st; 258 lb)

Rugby union career
- Position: Prop
Amateur team(s)
Years	Team	Apps	(Points)
- Midleton
–	Dolphin		
Senior career
Years	Team	Apps	(Points)
2011–2013	Munster A	8	(5)
- Correct as of 19 January 2013

Christy Condon (born 23 October 1981) is an Irish former rugby union player.

== Munster ==
Condon joined the Munster set-up on a training contract at the start of the 2011–12 season, and secured a development contract for the 2012–13 season.

He represented Munster A during their victorious 2011–12 British and Irish Cup campaign. It was announced on 14 May 2013 that Condon would be leaving Munster, to a yet unannounced club.
