= Janneman Stander =

South African rugby union player

- Full name: Johannes Hendrik Stander
- Born: 8 September 1993 (age 33) George, South Africa
- Height: 1.88 m (6 ft 2 in)
- Weight: 95 kg (14 st 13 lb; 209 lb)
- School: Hoër Landbouskool Oakdale, Riversdale
- Notable relative: CJ Stander (brother)

Rugby union career
- Position: Flanker
Youth career
- 2009–2011: SWD Eagles
- 2012–2013: Golden Lions
- 2014: SWD Eagles
Senior career
Years	Team	Apps	(Points)
2013	Golden Lions XV	1	(0)
2014–2018	SWD Eagles	64	(75)
- Correct as of 3 November 2018

Johannes Hendrik Stander (born 8 September 1993 in George, South Africa) is a South African rugby union player who last played for the SWD Eagles. His regular position is flanker.

== Career ==
=== Youth ===
At high school level, Stander was selected to represent the SWD Eagles at Under-16 level at the 2009 Grant Khomo Week and at Under-18 level at the 2011 Academy Week.

=== Golden Lions ===
After finishing high school, Stander moved to Johannesburg to join the Golden Lions academy prior to the 2012 season. He featured in all thirteen of the Golden Lions U19 side's matches during the 2012 Under-19 Provincial Championship; he scored one try against his former side SWD Eagles in their 46–5 victory in George and scored a hat-trick in the return leg between the sides in an 83–3 victory in Johannesburg. The Golden Lions U19s finished the season in second spot on the log to qualify for the title play-offs; Stander came on as a replacement in the semi-final, with his side losing 14–24 to Western Province U19 in Stellenbosch.

Stander made his first class debut during the 2013 Vodacom Cup, starting their 19–30 defeat against the Griffons, in what turned out to be his only appearance in a Golden Lions shirt.

=== SWD Eagles ===
At the end of 2013, Stander returned to George to rejoin the SWD Eagles. He made six appearances for them during the 2014 Vodacom Cup competition and scoring his first senior try, an effort right before half-time in a 51–7 victory over Kenyan invitational side Simba XV. The SWD Eagles finished third in the Southern Section of the competition to qualify for the quarter-finals; Stander played off the bench in the quarter-final, but his side suffered a 15–84 defeat at the hands of Griquas in Kimberley.

He made one appearances for the SWD Eagles during the 2014 Currie Cup qualification tournament, in a 33–31 victory against the Border Bulldogs in East London. SWD finished in fourth spot on the log, failing to qualify for the 2014 Currie Cup Premier Division and instead remaining in the First Division; Stander made one appearance in this competition, playing off the bench in a 24–35 defeat to the Boland Cavaliers. Still eligible to play at Under-21 level, he also started five of the SWD U21s matches during the 2014 Under-21 Provincial Championship. He helped them reach the title play-offs and started their 40–33 semi-final victory against Boland U21 in Wellington. However, he could not prevent them losing 3–46 to Eastern Province U21 in the final in Welkom.

== Personal ==
He is the younger brother of Irish International CJ Stander, who played for the South Africa Under-20 side at the 2009 and 2010 IRB Junior World Championships, for the Blue Bulls in domestic rugby and the Bulls in Super Rugby before joining Irish side Munster.
