= Roberto Santamaria (rugby union) =

Italian rugby union player & coach

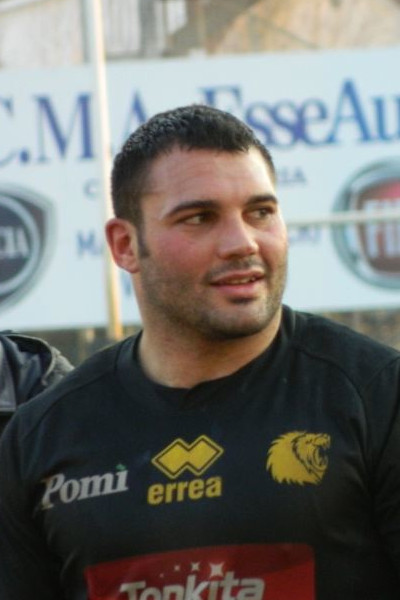
- Santamaria in 2013
- Born: Roberto Santamaria; 21 September 1986 (age 40) Messina, Sicily, Italy
- Height: 1.82 m (5 ft 11 1/2 in)
- Weight: 100 kg (220 lb; 16 st)

Rugby union career
- Position: Hooker
Youth career
- CUS Messina
- Viadana
Senior career
Years	Team	Apps	(Points)
2006–2010	Viadana	34	(10)
2010–2012	Aironi	29	(0)
2012–2013	Viadana	23	(5)
2013–2014	Doncaster Knights		
2014–2016	Viadana	21	(0)
2014–2015	→Zebre Parma	1	(0)
2015–2017	→Benetton	18	(0)
2017–2019	Petrarca	35	(15)
Coaching career
- Years: Team
- 2018–2019: Casale (head coach)
- 2019–2021: Petrarca (scrum coach)
- 2021–2024: Italy (head coach Under 18)
- 2024–2025: Italy (head coach Under 20)
- 2025–: Zebre Parma (scrum coach)

Roberto Santamaria (Messina, 21 settembre 1986) is an Italian coach and former union rugby player, who used to play as a hooker. Since 2021 he is a coach for the Italian Rugby Federation, where he had several positions, including coach of the Italian Under 18 and Under-20 national teams and coach of the Zebre Academy.

== Playing career ==
He started to play for CUS Messina and moved to play in the youth club of Viadana at the age of 16. He debuted for Viadana senior team during the Coppa Italia 2005–2006. In the following season, he debuted in Super 10, the top tier national league, winning the Coppa Italia and the Supercoppa. In 2007–08, still with Viadana, he debuted in Heineken Cup.

After the establishment of the franchise for the Celtic League, Santamaria signed in 2010 with Aironi, of which he was the vice captain behind Marco Bortolami. In the following season, he played several times as captain of the team.

Following the franchise was disbanded in 2012, Santamaria came back again to Viadana in Eccellenza, where he served as captain and assistant coach.

At the end of the 2012–13 Eccellenza season, he was released from Viadana and was signed by Doncaster Knights, English club playing in National League 1 (third division), with whom he was promoted to the Championship at the end of the 2013–14 season. In July 2014, he came back to Viadana, and played for a season as permit player for Zebre in Pro12. In the 2015–16 season, he was signed by Benetton with the same contract, until he became a full-time player for them in the following year.

In 2017, he moved to Petrarca Padova, where he played until his retirement in 2019.

== Coaching career ==
After the initial experience as youth coach for Viadana, he coached in England for Yorkshire Carnegie. In 2018, he became head coach of Casale and achieved the promotion in Serie A. At the end of the 2018–19 season, he became assistant coach of Andrea Marcato for Petrarca, specialising as scrum coach.

In 2021, he worked for FIR as Under 18 national team coach and was promoted to head coach of the Under 20 national team in 2024. He also worked as coach of the Zebre Academy in Parma.

In June 2025, it was announced that he would become scrum coach of senior Zebre team in URC and leave the Under 20 national team.

== Honours ==
- Coppa Italia: 1
  Viadana: 2006–07
- Trofeo Eccellenza : 2
  Viadana: 2012–13, 2015–16
- Italian Supercoppa: 1
  Viadana: 2007
