= Hanno Kitshoff =

South African rugby union player

- Full name: Johannes Jakobus Kitshoff
- Born: 25 January 1984 (age 42) George, South Africa
- Height: 1.91 m (6 ft 3 in)
- Weight: 92 kg (14 st 7 lb; 203 lb)
- School: Worcester Gymnasium, Worcester

Rugby union career
- Position: Lock / Flanker / No 8
Youth career
- 2004: Boland Cavaliers
- 2005: Griquas
Amateur team(s)
Years	Team	Apps	(Points)
2003–2010	Rawsonville		
2011	Durbanville-Bellville		
2012	Ceres		
Senior career
Years	Team	Apps	(Points)
2012–2016	Boland Cavaliers	62	(20)
- Correct as of 9 October 2016

Johannes Jakobus Kitshoff (born 25 January 1984 in George, South Africa) is a former South African rugby union player, that played first class rugby with the Boland Cavaliers between 2012 and 2016. He was a utility forward that could play as a lock, flanker or number eight.

He announced his retirement at the end of the 2016 season.

== Career ==
=== Youth and amateur rugby ===
At school level, he played for Worcester Gymnasium and he represented Boland at various underage levels, including playing in the 2004 Under-20 Provincial Championship. He was also part of the Griquas U21 side that played in the Under-21 Provincial Championship in 2005.

He then spent years playing club rugby for Rawsonville in the Boland club leagues. He joined Durbanville-Bellville in the Western Province Super League for 2011 before returning to Boland to play for Ceres.

=== Boland Cavaliers ===
Kitshoff finally got a chance to play at provincial level when he joined the Boland Cavaliers for the 2012 Currie Cup First Division season. He started their opening match of the season against the Pumas in Nelspruit on 7 July 2012 to make his first class debut, aged 28, eventually making seven appearances in the competition.

In 2013, he made eight appearances in the Vodacom Cup and Currie Cup competitions and he played in all seven of their matches in the 2014 Vodacom Cup competition. He also started five of their six matches in the 2014 Currie Cup qualification tournament, where they finished fifth to progress to the 2014 Currie Cup First Division.
