= James Downey (rugby union) =

Irish rugby union player

- Born: 23 March 1981 (age 45) Dublin, Ireland
- Height: 1.93 m (6 ft 4 in)
- Weight: 105 kg (16.5 st; 231 lb)
- School: Belvedere College
- University: University College Dublin

Rugby union career
- Position: Centre
Amateur team(s)
Years	Team	Apps	(Points)
- Clontarf
Senior career
Years	Team	Apps	(Points)
2003–2004	Leinster	9	(5)
2004–2006	Connacht	26	(10)
2006	Munster	3	(0)
2006–2007	Calvisano	18	(5)
2007–2012	Northampton Saints	148	(65)
2012–2014	Munster	44	(10)
2014–2015	Glasgow Warriors	7	(0)
2015–2016	Wasps	9	(0)
- Correct as of 19 May 2016
International career
Years	Team	Apps	(Points)
2009	Ireland Wolfhounds	3	(0)
2013	Ireland	1	(0)
- Correct as of 21 March 2015

James Downey (born 23 March 1981) is an Irish former rugby union player. He played as a centre. In May 2016, Downey announced his retirement from rugby.

== Early life ==
Downey was educated at Belvedere College, where he won the Leinster Schools Junior Cup.

== Leinster ==
Downey made his debut for his home province on 10 October 2003, against Cardiff Blues. He scored his first try for Leinster on 2 April 2004 against Glasgow Warriors. Downey left the province to join Connacht for the start of the 2004–05 season.

== Connacht ==
Downey struggled to gain game time at Connacht due to injuries, managing only three games during the 2005–06 season, and was released from his contract.

== Munster ==
In an effort to find more game time, Downey accepted a trial at the then Heineken Cup champions Munster. He made his debut against Cardiff Blues in the Celtic League on 1 September 2006. Downey played two more games for Munster, against Border Reivers and Glasgow Warriors, but left Munster when offered more game time with Italian club Rugby Calvisano.

== Calvisano ==
The lure of Heineken Cup rugby led to Downey joining the Italian Super 10 (now Top12) side Calvisano. The club were in Pool 3 of the 2006–07 Heineken Cup and, after releasing one of their centres, were looking for a new player. Then coach, Marc Delpoux, had been impressed by Downey when Connacht played Narbonne in October 2004, and brought him to Brescia.

== Northampton ==
Downey signed for Saints in June 2007. He made his debut for the club against London Welsh in National Division 1 on 1 September 2007, and scored his first try against Bedford Blues on 22 September. He was part of the Saints team that secured promotion to the Guinness Premiership in 2008. In the 2008–09 season, Downey helped Saints secure European silverware when they beat CS Bourgoin-Jallieu to secure the 2008–09 European Challenge Cup.

== Return to Munster ==
Downey rejoined Munster on a two-year deal from the 2012–13 season. He arrived in Cork to join up with the Munster squad in May 2012, after playing his last game for Northampton.

Downey played his first game of his return to Munster on 1 September 2012, starting at Inside Centre in their opening league fixture against Edinburgh. He scored his first try for Munster in their league fixture against Ospreys on 23 February 2014.

== Glasgow ==
On 27 June 2014, it was announced that Downey had signed a two-year contract with Glasgow Warriors.

== Loan to Wasps ==
On 10 February 2015, it was announced that Downey had joined Aviva Premiership side Wasps on loan for the remainder of the 2014–15 season.

== Ireland ==
Downey's form for Northampton saw him earn a place in the Ireland A team for the 2009 Churchill Cup. He came off the bench in the opening fixture on 10 June 2009 against Canada, before starting against Georgia on 14 June. Downey had to settle for an appearance off the bench again as Ireland A beat England Saxons 22–49 to win the 2009 Churchill Cup Final. On 2 June 2013, Downey was added to the senior Ireland squad to tour North America. He made his senior debut for Ireland on 15 June 2013, starting against Canada.

== Honours ==
Northampton Saints

- European Challenge Cup (1): 2008–09

Ireland Wolfhounds

- Churchill Cup (1): 2009
