= Ross Jones (rugby union) =

Welsh rugby union player

- Born: 11 January 1992 (age 34) Llanelli, Wales
- Height: 180 cm (5 ft 11 in)
- Weight: 90 kg (14 st 2 lb)
- School: Leinster Academy

Rugby union career
Senior career
Years	Team	Apps	(Points)
–	Rotherham R.U.F.C.		
International career
Years	Team	Apps	(Points)
- Leinster Schools under-16
–	Leinster Schools under-18		
–	Ireland under-18		
–	Wales U20		
- Correct as of 10 November 2012

Ross Jones (born 11 January 1992) is a Welsh rugby union player. A full-back, he was educated at Castleknock College, Dublin where he played for the Junior and Senior Cup Teams, captaining the SCT in his final year in 2010.
