= Luke O'Dea =

Irish rugby player (born 1990)

- Born: 18 July 1990 (age 36) Birmingham, England
- Height: 1.80 m (5 ft 11 in)
- Weight: 90 kg (14 st; 200 lb)

Rugby union career
- Position(s): Fullback, Wing
Amateur team(s)
| Years | Team | Apps | (Points) |
- Shannon
Senior career
| Years | Team | Apps | (Points) |
| 2011–2015 | Munster | 20 | (30) |
| 2015–2016 | Lille MR | 13 | (15) |
- Correct as of 28 February 2016

Luke O'Dea (born 18 July 1990) is an Irish rugby union player. He can play at either fullback or wing.

== Munster ==
O'Dea made his full Munster debut against Edinburgh on 26 November 2011 in a Pro12 game. He also scored his first try for Munster in this game. O'Dea scored his second try for Munster in the 33–17 loss to Ulster in the Pro12, after retaining his place from the win against Connacht the previous week. He signed a Development contract with Munster in March 2012, and was added to Munster's 2011–12 Heineken Cup squad. O'Dea started for Munster A in the final of the 2011–12 British and Irish Cup, and scored a try as they beat Cross Keys 31-12. He made his Heineken Cup debut on 16 December 2012, as a replacement against Saracens. O'Dea agreed a two-year contract extension with Munster in January 2013.

== Lille Métropole Rugby ==
In June 2015, it was announced that O'Dea was leaving Munster to join French Fédérale 1 side Lille Métropole Rugby.

== International ==
O'Dea represented the Ireland Sevens team from June 2016 to July 2017.
