= Alan Cotter (rugby union) =

- Born: 23 September 1986 (age 40) Limerick, Ireland
- Height: 1.88 m (6 ft 2 in)
- Weight: 120 kg (19 st; 260 lb)
- School: St Munchin's College

Rugby union career
- Position: Prop
Amateur team(s)
Years	Team	Apps	(Points)
- Young Munster
Senior career
Years	Team	Apps	(Points)
2013–2015	Munster	5	(0)
2012	→ London Irish (loan)	3	(0)
2012	→ Bath (loan)	2	(0)
2015–2016	Provence	14	(5)
2016–2018	Limoges	37	(0)
2018–2019	Lannemezan	23	(5)
- Correct as of 12 May 2019

Alan Cotter (born 23 September 1986) is a retired Irish rugby union player. He played as a prop.

== Munster ==
Cotter joined the senior Munster squad at the beginning of the 2012–13 season, having earned a development contract after two years in the Munster Academy. Cotter made his senior Munster debut as a replacement against Connacht in the Pro12 on 27 December 2013. He signed a one-year development contract extension in March 2014.

== Loan to London Irish ==
Cotter joined London Irish on a short-term loan in September 2012, replacing his Munster teammate John Ryan.

== Loan to Bath ==
Cotter joined another Aviva Premiership side, Bath, on loan in November 2012.

== Provence Rugby ==
In July 2015, Cotter moved to Aix-en-Provence in the south of France to play with the Pro D2 side Provence Rugby.
