= Barry O'Mahony =

- Born: 26 September 1986 (age 40) Limerick, Ireland
- Height: 1.85 m (6 ft 1 in)
- Weight: 99 kg (15.6 st; 218 lb)
- School: Crescent College
- University: University College Cork
- Notable relative: Ronan O'Mahony (brother)

Rugby union career
- Position: Flanker
Amateur team(s)
Years	Team	Apps	(Points)
- Garryowen
–	Dolphin		
–	Clontarf		
Senior career
Years	Team	Apps	(Points)
2012–2015	Munster	4	(0)
- Correct as of 9 February 2014

Barry O'Mahony (born 26 September 1986) is an Irish rugby union player. He plays club rugby for Clontarf in the All-Ireland League.

== Munster ==
O'Mahony completed the 3-year Munster academy, but was released. After a series of impressive performances for Clontarf, he was called into the Munster 'A' team during their 2011–12 British and Irish Cup campaign, putting in a string of important performances on the way to winning the tournament. At the conclusion of the 2011–12 season, O'Mahony was given a development contract in the senior Munster squad.

He made his full Munster debut on 1 September 2012, as a replacement in Munster's opening 2012–13 Pro 12 league fixture against Edinburgh at Murrayfield. O'Mahony extended his development contract for a further year in early April 2013. He made his first start for Munster in a United Rugby Championship fixture against Cardiff Blues on 8 February 2014. He signed a one-year development contract extension in March 2014. In June 2015, it was announced that O'Mahony would be leaving Munster.
